= Rebels (kickboxing) =

Martial-arts entertainment planning and promotion

- Company type: Private
- Industry: Martial-arts entertainment planning and promotion
- Founded: 2010
- Founders: Genki Yamaguchi
- Headquarters: Tokyo, Japan
- Owner: Def Fellow
- Website: Rebels

Rebels (Japanese: レベルス; stylized as REBELS) is a defunct martial arts entertainment planning and promotion brand, which was established in 2010 and merged into Knock Out in 2021.

== History ==
Rebels was established by the former two-weight Martial Arts Japan kickboxing champion Genki Yamaguchi on December 1, 2009, with the aim of popularizing the sport of muay thai in Japan. The inaugural event was held jointly by M-1 Challenge and Cross-Point on January 29, 2010, and was headline by a lightweight bout between Arashi Fujihara and TOMONORI. Starting with the third event, Rebels-EX, Cross Point broke their partnership with M-1 and remained as the sole promoter and organizer of the events.

On June 11, 2011, Rebels announced a partnership with the Dutch-based It's Showtime, which allowed cross-promotion and mutual exchange of fighters under contract. The first joint event was held on July 18, 2011, under the name “Stand up JAPAN!” REBELS × IT'S SHOWTIME 〜 REBELS.8 〜 and was headlined by a -61 kg title eliminator between Rebels contracted Kan Itabashi and Genki Yamamoto.

On October 28, 2012, Rebels announced events from that point forward would be held under two rulesets: Rebels rules, which was similar to K-1 and Rebels Muay Thai rules, which allowed for elbows, sweeps and five-round bouts.

Rebels entered into a partnership with Knock Out on May 20, 2019, which likewise held events under kickboxing and muay thai rules. On June 15, 2020, Bushido Road sold Knock Out ownership rights to Def Fellow, the operating company of Rebels. The final Rebels event, "REBELS～The FINAL～", was held on February 28, 2021. A month later, the brand was merged with Knock Out.

== Rules ==
- Rebels Rules: Strikes with the fist, knee and leg were allowed; elbow strikes, clinching and sweeps were prohibited. Matches were contested in three, three-minute rounds.
- Rebels Muay Thai: Strikes with the fist, knee, leg and elbows were allowed; clinching was allowed so long as one of the fighters remains active. Matches were contested in five, three-minute rounds.
- Fouls: Spitting, biting, strikes to the groin, strikes to the back of the head, strikes after the referee has called for a break and strikes thrown at an opponent in a state of knockdown were considered fouls under both rules-sets. Additionally, elbows strikes and prolonged clinching were considered founds under the Rebels Rules.
- Scoring: Number of knockdowns and presence or absence of damage was the primary scoring criteria, with three knockdowns in a single round resulting in an automatic technical knockout. Number of clean strikes and ring generalship was the secondary scoring criteria.

== Championships history ==
=== Rebels Super Welterweight Championship ===
Weight limit: 70 kg (154.3 lb)

Rebels Rules

Name	Date	Defenses
(Japan) Hinata (def. Takuma Konishi)	April 14, 2013	def. Kentaro Hokuto on March 16, 2014; def. Sibmean Sitchefboontham on February 17, 2019
(Japan) Kaito Ono (def. Hinata)	February 28, 2021	

Rebels Muay Thai Rules

Name	Date	Defenses
(Japan) T-98 (def. Kentarō Hokuto)	April 19, 2015	
T-98 vacated the title on June 14, 2019
(Japan) Eiji Yoshida (def. Yoshiro Tsuzaki)	October 16, 2019	

=== Rebels Welterweight Championship ===
Weight limit: 67.5 kg (148.8 lb)

Rebels Rules

Name	Date	Defenses
(Japan) UMA (def. Caz Janjira)	October 6, 2019	
UMA vacated the title on December 15, 2020, after suffering a retinal detachment

Rebels Muay Thai Rules

Name	Date	Defenses
(Japan) Naoto Itakura (def. Daisuke Tsutsumi)	October 20, 2013	
Itakura retired from professional competition on July 25, 2014

=== Rebels Super Lightweight Championship ===
Weight limit: 65 kg (143.3 lb)

Rebels Rules

Name	Date	Defenses
(Japan) Zen Fujita (def. Mohan Dragon)	October 28, 2012	
Fujita vacated the title on May 16, 2014, as he was unable to defend the title
(Japan) UMA (def. Hiroki Nakamura)	July 25, 2014	
(Japan) Yōsuke Mizouchi (def. UMA)	April 19, 2015	

Rebels Muay Thai Rules

Name	Date	Defenses
(Japan) Yōsuke Mizouchi (def. Hiroyuki Norose)	October 26, 2014	
(Japan) Hachimaki (def. Yōsuke Mizouchi)	January 25, 2015	def. Shinji Suzuki on July 12, 2015
(Japan) Fukashi Mizutani (def. Hachimaki)	November 30, 2016	
Fukashi vacated the title in 2017
(Thailand) Suarek Rukkukamui (def. Shinji Suzuki)	November 24, 2017	def. Takuya Sugimoto on June 6, 2018

=== Rebels Lightweight Championship ===
Weight limit: 62.5 kg (137.8 lb)

Rebels Rules

Name	Date	Defenses
(Japan) Keisuke Niwa (def. Tatsuya Inaishi)	April 20, 2019	
(Japan) Bazooka Koki (def. Keisuke Niwa)	August 30, 2020	

Rebels Muay Thai Rules

Name	Date	Defenses
(Japan) Hachimaki (def. Akihiro Kuroda)	July 21, 2013	
Hachimaki vacated the title on May 14, 2014 to move up to super lightweight
(Japan) Sho Ogawa (def. Yukimitsu Takahashi)	September 28, 2014	
(Japan) Hiroaki Raiden (def. Sho Ogawa)	July 12, 2015	
Raiden retired from professional competition on June 11, 2017
(Japan) Ryotaro (def. Santana Pilano)	November 24, 2017	
(Thailand) Suarek Rukkukamui (def. Shunsuke Miyabi for the interim title)	October 6, 2019	

=== Rebels Super Featherweight Championship ===
Weight limit: 60 kg (132.3 lb)

Rebels Rules

Name	Date	Defenses
(Japan) Hikaru Machida (def. Fukashi)	October 20, 2013	def. SHIGERU on October 26, 2015; def. Riki Goshu on July 12, 2015
Machida vacated the title on May 16, 2019
(Japan) Hiroki Suzuki (def. Kenshiro Aoi)	June 9, 2019	def. Shely Santana on February 29, 2020
Suzuki vacated the title on December 20, 2020, after moving to boxing

Rebels Muay Thai Rules

Name	Date	Defenses
(Japan) Yasuyuki (def. SHIGERU)	January 26, 2014	

=== Rebels Featherweight Championship ===
Weight limit: 57.5 kg (126.8 lb)

Rebels Rules

Name	Date	Defenses
(Japan) Kazuki Koyano (def. Kenta Yagami)	October 23, 2016	

Rebels Muay Thai Rules

Name	Date	Defenses
(Japan) Yuya Kiyokawa (def. KING Kōhei)	December 23, 2014	
Kiyokawa retired from professional competition on December 22, 2016
(Japan) Kenta Yagami (def. Takahiro Sakuragi)	December 23, 2014	
Yagami vacated the title on April 20, 2019, after losing in a non-title bout
(Japan) Haruto Yasumoto (def. Shogo Kuriaki)	June 9, 2019	

=== Rebels Super Bantamweight Championship ===
Weight limit: 55 kg (121.3 lb)

Rebels Muay Thai Rules

Name	Date	Defenses
(Japan) Ryuya Kusakabe (def. Taisuke Degai)	July 21, 2013	
Kusakabe vacated the title on February 19, 2014 when he went to boxing.
(Japan) Masahide Kudo (def. Takeo Oode)	May 10, 2015	def. Shuto Miyazaki on April 3, 2016
Kudo vacated the title in 2017 when he signed with the RISE promotion.
(Japan) KOUMA (def. Hidemaru)	June 11, 2017	
(Japan) KING Kyosuke (def. KOUMA)	April 27, 2018	
Kyosuke vacated the title on June 9, 2019, after losing in a non-title bout

=== Rebels Super Flyweight Championship ===
Weight limit: 52.5 kg (115.7 lb)

Rebels Rules

Name	Date	Defenses
(Japan) Ryuji Kato (def. Masataka Seki)	July 25, 2014	
(Japan) Eisaku Ogasawara (def. Yuki Ueba)	July 12, 2015	
Ogasawara vacated the title on September 6, 2017, after winning the ISKA title

Rebels Muay Thai Rules

Name	Date	Defenses
(Japan) Kiminori Matsuzaki (def. Michael FlySkyGym)	October 23, 2016	
(Japan) Haruto Yasumoto (def. Kiminori Matsuzaki)	June 11, 2017	
Yasumoto vacated the title in December 2019
(Japan) Ryuto Oinuma (def. Shinjiro Sato)	June 6, 2018	def. Takuya Hasunuma on December 5, 2018
(Japan) Yusei Shirahata (def. Ryuto Oinuma)	February 28, 2021	

=== Rebels Flyweight Championship ===
Weight limit: 50.8 kg (112.0 lb)

Rebels Muay Thai Rules

Name	Date	Defenses
(Japan) Eisaku Ogasawara (def. Hiroyuki Yamano)	May 6, 2013	
Ogasawara vacated the title on May 16, 2014 in order to move up in weight
(Japan) Kiminori Matsuzaki (def. Naoya Yajima)	March 4, 2015	
(Japan) Kazuya Okuwaki (def. Matsuzaki Kiminori)	January 24, 2016	
(Japan) Satsuma 3373 (def. Kazuya Okuwaki)	August 7, 2016	

=== Rebels Women's Atomweight Championship ===
Weight limit: 46 kg (101.4 lb)

Rebels Muay Thai Rules

Name	Date	Defenses
(Japan) Panchan Rina (def. MISAKI)	August 30, 2020	
