= Kaito Ono =

Japanese shoot boxer (born 1997)

Kaito
- Born: Kaito Ono; August 21, 1997 (age 29); Osaka, Japan
- Native name: 大野海人
- Height: 1.80 m (5 ft 11 in)
- Weight: 70 kg (154 lb; 11 st)
- Style: Shoot boxing
- Stance: Orthodox
- Fighting out of: Tokyo, Japan
- Team: SB Risshikaikan (2008-2015); Team F.O.D. (2016-present)
- Years active: 2014 - present

Kickboxing record
- Total: 75
- Wins: 62
- By knockout: 26
- Losses: 12
- By knockout: 2
- No contests: 1

Kaito Ono (Japanese: 大野海人; born August 21, 1997), better known by his ring name Kaito (海人), is a Japanese kickboxer and Shoot boxer. He is the current KNOCK OUT Black Super Welterweight champion and the current SHOOT BOXING World Super Welterweight champion, as well as the former REBELS Black Super Welterweight champion, the former SHOOT BOXING Super Lightweight champion and the 2018 SHOOT BOXING S-Cup World Tournament Winner.

As of January 2023, he is ranked as the tenth best lightweight (-71 kg) kickboxer in the world by both Combat Press and Beyond Kickboxing. Combat Press ranked him as a top ten super flyweight (-58 kg) between August 2021 and April 2022, as well as a top ten super featherweight (-68 kg) between July and October 2022.

== Kickboxing career ==
=== Lightweight career ===
==== Next Generation Cup ====
Ono made his professional debut against Jun Kitagawa at SHOOT BOXING 2014 act.1 on February 23, 2014, in a lightweight rookie rules bout. He won the fight by a third-round knockout. Ono next faced Takahito Suzuki at SHOOT BOXING 2014 act.2 on April 18, 2014. He forced Suzuki's corner to throw in the towel at the 1:20 minute mark of the third round. Ono made his third professional appearance at SHOOT BOXING 2014 act.3 on June 21, 2014, opposite Tetsuyuki Uemura. He once again forced his opponent's corner to throw in the towel, at the 1:55 minute mark of the opening round.

His perfect 3–0 record earned him a place in the 2014 J-NETWORK Next Generation lightweight (62 kg) tournament, which took place at J-NETWORK J-FIGHT in SHINJUKU～vol.38 on July 27, 2014. In the quarterfinals, he stopped RS YUTAKA with low kicks in the first round. In the semifinals, he met Hideki and won the two round bout by unanimous decision, with two scorecards of 19–18 and one scorecard of 20–18. Ono met MASATO in the finals, and won by a majority decision after two rounds. Two of the judges scored the fight 20–19 in his favor, while the third judge scored it an even 20–20.

==== Shootboxing top contender ====
Ono faced Kazuki Tamakawa at SHOOT BOXING 2014 act.4 on September 20, 2014. He won the fight by unanimous decision. Ono, whose seven victories had earned him the status of Shootboxing's top ranked lightweight contender, was then booked to face the 7–2–1 mixed martial artist Teruto Ishihara at SHOOT BOXING S-cup 65 kg World Tournament 2018 on November 30, 2014. The fight was ruled a majority decision draw after the first three rounds, with one judge scoring the bout 30–29 for Ono. He was awarded the majority decision after an extra fourth round was contested.

Ono faced the fourth-ranked RISE super featherweight contender Koudai Nobe at RISE 103 on January 24, 2015. He lost the fight by unanimous decision, with all three judges scoring the bout 30–29 for Nobe. Ono rebounded from his first professional loss with a unanimous decision victory over TASUKU at SHOOT BOXING 2015～SB 30th Anniversary～ act.1 on February 21, 2015. Ono failed to build on this success however, as he suffered a majority decision loss at the hands of Koji Ikegami at SHOOT BOXING 2015～SB 30th Anniversary～ act.2 on April 18, 2015.

Ono faced the second-ranked Shootboxing lightweight conteder Yuji Sugawara at SHOOT BOXING 2015～SB 30th Anniversary～ act.3 on June 21, 2015. He won the fight by majority decision, with two scorecards of 29–28 and one scorecard of 29–29.

Ono faced the Shooto Pacific Rim Lightweight champion Taiki Tsuchiya at SHOOT BOXING 30th ANNIVERSARY "CAESAR TIME!" on August 22, 2015. The fight was ruled a majority decision draw after the first three rounds were contested, with scores of 27–26, 27–27 and 27–27. He was able to knock Tsuchiya down in the first round with a right straight, but was immediately deducted a point for kicking a downed opponent. Ono was suplexed by Tsuchiya in the second round, which awarded his opponent two shoot points. Ono was awarded the majority decision after an extra fourth round was fought.

Ono faced the future K-1 Super Lightweight champion Rukiya Anpo at SHOOTBOXING THE LAST BOMB on October 3, 2015. He won the fight by a second-round knockout. He first knocked Anpo down with a left hook, before flooring him with a front kick near the end of the round, which left his opponent unable to beat the eight-count.

Ono faced the former DEEP KICK super lightweight champion Yukimitsu Takahashi at SHOOT BOXING 2016 act.1 on February 13, 2016. Ono departed from Risshi Kaikan prior to this fight and began training at Team F.O.D. He won the fight by unanimous decision, with all three judges scoring the bout 30–29 in his favor.

Ono faced Hiroaki Oyama at SHOOT BOXING 2016 act.3 on June 5, 2016. He won the fight by unanimous decision, with scores of 30–29, 30–28 and 30–27. Ono faced Kiyoto at SHOOT BOXING 2016 act.4 on September 19, 2016. He stopped his opponent with repeated knee strikes in the final minute of the second round. Ono went overseas for the first time in his career on December 23, 2016, as he was booked to face Zhou Jiankun at Liberty War II. Jiankun was unable to make the agreed upon weight at the official weigh-ins and was replaced by Liu Ya. Ono won the fight by unanimous decision.

Ono faced YUSHI at SHOOT BOXING 2017 act.1 on February 11, 2017. As Ono failed to make weight for the bout, he was deducted 2 points prior to the start of the fight and had to fight in the larger 8 oz gloves, while YUSHI was able to compete in 6 oz gloves which are normally used. Although Ono was able to nonetheless win the fight, the decision victory was immediately overturned to a no contest due to the weight miss.

==== Catchweight bouts ====
Ono faced the 2016 S-Cup -65 kg World Tournament winner Zakaria Zouggary in a -64 kg catchweight bout at SHOOT BOXING 2017 act.2 on April 8, 2017. He lost the fight by majority decision, with two judges awarding Zouggary a 49–48 scorecard, while the third judge had it scored as an even 48–48 draw.

Ono faced the former two-weight Shootboxing world champion Hiroaki Suzuki in a -63.5 kg catchweight bout at SHOOT BOXING 2017 act.3 on September 16, 2017. He opened a cut on Suzuki's forehead near the end of the opening round, which led to the ringside physician calling the fight off due to the profuse bleeding.

=== Super lightweight career ===
==== Shootboxing champion ====
Ono faced the DEEP KICK super lightweight champion Yuya in the semifinals of the Shootboxing super lightweight tournament, held to fill the vacant championship, at SHOOT BOXING BATTLE SUMMIT-GROUND ZERO TOKYO 2017 on November 27, 2017. He won the fight by unanimous decision, with two scorecards of 30–27 and one scorecard of 30–28. Ono was able to open a cut above Yuya's eye in the second round, but the damage done wasn't sufficient to stop the contest. Ono faced Kenta Yamada in the finals of the one-day tournament. He won the fight by majority decision. Two judges scored the fight 30–29 in his favor, while the third judge scored the bout 29–29.

Ono faced Tapruwan Hadesworkout at SHOOT BOXING 2018 act.1 on February 10, 2018. He won the fight by a fourth-round knockout. Ono faced the former RISE Lightweight and REBELS Red Super Lightweight champion Fukashi Mizutani at SHOOT BOXING 2018 act.2 on April 1, 2018. He opened a cut of Fukashi's forehead with an elbow strike in the fourth round, which forced the ringside physician to stop the fight. Ono faced Jaowear Sirilakgym at SHOOT BOXING 2018 act.3 on June 10, 2018. He made quick work of his opponent, as he stopped him with a flurry of punches in the opening round.

Ono made his Rizin debut at Rizin 11 against Yoshiya Uzatsuyo on July 29, 2018. He won the fight by a third-round knockout. Ono next faced Sho Ogawa at Rizin 12 on August 12, 2018. He won the fight by unanimous decision.

His nine fight winning streak was snapped by Chamuaktong Fightermuaythai, who beat him at SHOOT BOXING 2018 act.4 on September 15, 2018. The fight was ruled a split decision after the first five rounds were contested, with two judges awarding a 50–49 scorecard each to Chamuaktong and Kaito, while the third judge had it scored 50–50. Chakmuaktong was given the majority decision after an extension round was fought.

==== Shootboxing S-Cup ====
Ono took part in the 2018 Shootboxing World S-Cup, which was contested at super lightweight and took place on November 18, 2018. He made quick work of his quarterfinal opponent Cho Gyeon Jae, as he was able to twice knock him down by the 2:16 minute mark of the opening round, which resulted in an automatic technical knockout victory for him under the Shootboxing tournament rules. Ono faced Kenta Yamada in the tournament semifinals, having beaten him by majority decision a year prior. He was more convincing in the rematch, as he forced a doctor stoppage in the third round. Ono faced UMA in the finals of the one-day tournament. He won the fight by a first-round technical knockout.

Ono faced the former REBELS Black Super Lightweight champion Yōsuke Mizouchi at KING OF KNOCK OUT 2018 on December 9, 2018. He won the fight by a third-round technical knockout. Ono faced the two-weight Lumpinee Stadium champion Pongsiri P.K.Saenchaimuaythaigym at SHOOT BOXING 2019 act.1 on February 11, 2019. He won the fight by unanimous decision, with all three judges awarding him a 50–46 scorecard. Ono's five fight win-streak was snapped by Chadd Collins at SHOOT BOXING 2019 act.2 on April 27, 2019, who beat him by unanimous decision.

=== Super welterweight ===
==== Catchweight bouts ====
Ono faced the former It's Showtime lightweight champion in a -69 kg catchweight bout at Shoot Boxing 2019 act.3 on June 23, 2019. He knocked Nakajima down three times inside of a single round to earn the technical knockout victory in the fourth round. Ono first dropped his opponent with a flying knee, which he followed up with a right low kick knockdown, before he finished Nakajima with another flying knee soon after.

Ono faced the RISE Middleweight champion in a -69 kg catchweight bout at Shoot Boxing 2019 act.4 on September 28, 2019. He won the fight by a close unanimous decision, with all three judges awarding him a 49–48 scorecard.

Ono moved down the welterweight (-67.5 kg) to face the reigning RISE Welterweight champion BeyNoah at SHOOT BOXING GROUND ZERO TOKYO 2019 on December 3, 2019. He won the fight by unanimous decision, with two scorecards of 49–48 and one scorecard of 50–48.

Ono faced Pinphet Banchamek in a -68 kg catchweight bout at SHOOT BOXING 2020 act.1 on February 15, 2020. Despite coming in as the favorite, Ono lost the fight by majority decision. The bout was ruled a majority decision draw after the first five rounds were contested, with two judges handing in an even 49–49 scorecard, while the third judge scored it 50–48 for Ono. The fight was called a draw two more times, before Pinphet was given the majority decision at the end of the third extension round.

Ono made his return to Rizin at Rizin 23 – Yokohama on August 10, 2020, when he was booked to face Daryl Lokoku in a -73 kg catchweight bout. He won the fight by unanimous decision, with all three judges scoring the bout 30–28 in his favor.

==== Move to super welterweight ====
Ono made his RISE debut against Tsukuru Midorikawa, in what was also his super welterweight (-70 kg) debut, at RISE DEAD or ALIVE Yokohama on October 11, 2020. He won the fight by majority decision, with two judges scoring the bout 30–28 for Ono, while the third judge had it scored as an even 30–30.

Ono faced Makoto Kitamura at Shoot Boxing 2020 act.2 on November 28, 2020. He knocked Kitamura out with a high kick 14 seconds into the third round.

==== REBELS champion ====
Ono challenged Hinata for the REBELS Black Super Welterweight Championship at REBELS ～The FINAL～ on February 28, 2021, the last REBELS event to be held. He captured the title by majority decision, with scores of 30–28, 29–28 and 29–29. A month later, REBELS was merged with KNOCK OUT and Ono was promoted to the status of KNOCK OUT Super Welterweight champion.

Ono faced the one-time K-1 super welterweight title challenger Mohan Dragon in a -68 kg catchweight bout at Shoot Boxing 2021 act.2 on April 10, 2021. He won the fight by unanimous decision.

Ono returned to super welterweight to face Sho Kogane at Shoot Boxing 2021 act.3 on June 20, 2021. He won the fight by unanimous decision, sweeping every round on all three of the judges' scorecards.

Ono faced Chansuk VertexGym at Shoot Boxing 2021 act.4 on September 4, 2021. He won the fight by unanimous decision, with all three judges scoring the bout 30–29 in his favor.

Ono was booked to face Masashi Nakajima at RISE WORLD SERIES 2021 Osaka on November 14, 2021. He won the fight by unanimous decision, with all three judges awarding him a 30-26 scorecard.

Ono faced Joe Fellowgym at SHOOT BOXING 2021 Champion Carnival on December 26, 2021. He twice knocked Joe down with a right hook in the second round, which forced the referee to wave the fight off.

Ono faced Chuchai Hadesworkout in a -71 kg catchweight bout at SHOOT BOXING 2022 act.1 on February 13, 2022. He won the fight by a third-round knockout, stopping Chuchai with a left hook to the body at the 2:21 minute mark of the round.

Ono was booked to rematch BeyNoah in a 71.5 kg catchweight bout at RISE El Dorado 2022 on April 2, 2022. Kaito won the bout by first-round knockout, he landed a left hook that floored his opponent 35 seconds into the fight.

Ono faced the reigning K-1 welterweight champion Masaaki Noiri in a -68.5 kg catchweight bout at The Match 2022 on June 19, 2022. Ono won the fight by unanimous decision, after an extra round was contested, following a unanimous decision draw after the first three rounds.

Ono was booked to face Samo Petje at RISE WORLD SERIES 2022 Osaka on August 21, 2022. He won the fight by unanimous decision.

Ono faced Kendal Karakurt at SHOOT BOXING 2022 act.4 on September 17, 2022. He won the fight by unanimous decision, after two extra rounds were contested.

Ono faced the #1 ranked Glory lightweight contender Stoyan Koprivlenski at RISE WORLD SERIES / Glory Rivals 4 on December 25, 2022. He won the fight by split decision, with two judges scoring the bout 30–29 in his favor, while the third judge awarded an identical scorecard to Koprivlenski.

Ono faced Tsukuru Midorikawa at NO KICK NO LIFE on February 11, 2023, in what was Midorikawa's retirement bout. He won the fight by a third-round technical knockout. Ono twice knocked his opponent down, with an elbow in the first round and a left hook in the third round.

==== RISE champion ====
Ono challenged Lee Sung-hyun for the RISE Middleweight Championship at RISE EL DORADO 2023 on March 26, 2023. He won the fight by unanimous decision, with scores of 50–47, 50–48 and 50–48.

Ono was expected to face an undetermined opponent at SHOOT BOXING 2023 act.2 on April 30, 2023. He withdrew from the fight due to an avulsion fracture of the middle phalanx of the left second toe. Ono was rescheduled to face Samo Petje for the vacant SHOOT BOXING World Super Welterweight championship at SHOOT BOXING 2023 act.3 on June 25, 2023. He won the fight by unanimous decision, with two scorecards of 50–45 and one scorecard of 50–46.

Ono challenged Tyjani Beztati for the Glory Lightweight Championship at Glory 87 on August 19, 2023. He lost the fight by unanimous decision, as all five ringside officials awarded every round to his opponent.

Ono faced Massaro Glunder at SHOOT BOXING 2023 Series Final on November 14, 2023. He won the fight by a first-round knockout.

Ono was expected to face Mohammed Jaraya in a -72 kg catchweight bout at RISE WORLD SERIES 2023 Final Round on December 16, 2023. Jaraya withdrew from the bout on December 11, 2023, and was replaced by the undefeated James Condé. Ono won the fight by a first-round technical knockout.

Ono faced the two-weight Lumpinee Stadium and one-time ONE Featherweight Muay Thai World champion Petchmorakot Petchyindee Academy at Shoot Boxing 2024 act.1 on February 10, 2024. The fight was contested under shootboxing rules, with legal elbow strikes. He lost the fight by majority decision, after an extra fourth round was contested. Kaito faced Petchmorakot in a rematch, with the SHOOT BOXING World Super Welterweight championship on the line, at Shoot Boxing 2024 act.2 on April 13, 2024. He won the fight by majority decision, with scores of 50–49, 49–48 and 49–49.

Ono faced Arman Hambaryan at SHOOT BOXING 2024 act.3 on June 15, 2024. He won the fight by a second-round knockout.

Ono faced Dragomir Petrov at SHOOT BOXING 2024 act.4 on August 17, 2024. He won the fight by a second-round technical knockout, as Petrov was unable to continue competing due to a back injury after being swept.

Ono faced the former Glory Lightweight champion Davit Kiria at SHOOT BOXING 2024 act.5 on October 13, 2024. He won the fight by unanimous decision.

Ono faced Guerric Billet at SHOOT BOXING Battle Summit: Ground Zero Tokyo 2024 on December 26, 2024. He won the fight by unanimous decision. Ono revealed during a post-fight press conference that he had injured his right hand in the second round, although a scan of the same hand two days later showed no signs of fracture.

=== ONE Championship/Shootboxing ===
On January 31, 2025, it was announced that Kaito signed with ONE Championship and he was scheduled to make his debut against Marat Grigorian on March 23, 2025, at ONE 172. At the weigh-ins, Grigorian weighed in at 155.75 pounds, 0.75 pounds over the featherweight limit. Subsequently, the bout was cancelled after Kaito declined the catchweight bout.

Kaito faced Mohammad Siasarani at ONE Friday Fights 109 on May 23, 2025. He lost the fight by unanimous decision.

Kaito faced Enriko Kehl at SHOOT BOXING 2025 act.3 on June 22, 2025. He lost the fight by unanimous decision, with scores of 30—28, 30—28 and 30—29. After bouncing back with a victory over Petchmai Siadammooplara at SHOOT BOXING 2025 act.5, Kaito was booked to face Enriko Kehl in a rematch at SHOOT BOXING 40th Anniversary on November 24, 2025. He knocked Kehl down once enroute to winning the bout by unanimous decision.

Kaito made his first KNOCK OUT Black Super Welterweight Championship defense against Sitthichai Sitsongpeenong at KNOCK OUT.60 - K.O CLIMAX 2025 on December 30, 2025. He retained the title by a narrow, highly contested unanimous decision.

== Championships and accomplishment ==
=== Amateur ===
- All Japan Glove Karate Federation
  - 2008 All Japan Glove Karate Federation Elementary School 3rd Place
  - 2009 All Japan Glove Karate Federation Elementary School 3rd Place
  - 2010 All Japan Glove Karate Federation Middle School Champion
  - 2011 All Japan Glove Karate Federation Middle School Champion & Event MVP
  - 2012 All Japan Glove Karate Federation -60 kg Champion & Event MVP
  - 2013 All Japan Glove Karate Federation -65 kg Osaka Tournament Winner
- All Japan Kick
  - 2012 All Japan Junior Kick -55 kg Tournament Winner
- DEEP KICK
  - 2013 TOP RUN -60 kg Champion
  - 2013 TOP RUN -65 kg Champion

=== Professional ===
- J-NETWORK
  - 2014 J-NETWORK Next Generation Cup -62 kg Winner
- SHOOT BOXING
  - 2017 SHOOT BOXING Japan Super Lightweight Championship
  - 2018 SHOOT BOXING S-Cup World Tournament Winner
  - 2023 SHOOT BOXING World Super Welterweight championship
    - One successful title defense
- REBELS
  - 2021 REBELS Black Super Welterweight (-70kg) Championship
- KNOCK OUT
  - 2021 KNOCK OUT Black Super Welterweight (-70kg) Championship
    - One successful title defense
- RISE
  - 2023 RISE Middleweight (-70kg) Championship

Awards

- eFight.jp
  - 3x Fighter of the Month (June 2017, November 2018, April 2024)

== Fight record ==
Professional Kickboxing Record
62 Wins (26 (T)KO's), 12 Losses, 1 No Contest
| Date | Result | Opponent | Event | Location | Method | Round | Time |
| 2026-08-08 | Loss | (Iran) Mohammad Siasarani | ONE Samurai 2 | Tokyo, Japan | KO (High kick) | 1 | 1:47 |
ONE Samurai Featherweight Kickboxing Tournament Quarterfinal.
| 2026-04-29 | Loss | (Armenia) Marat Grigorian | ONE Samurai 1 | Tokyo, Japan | KO (punch) | 1 | 1:51 |
| 2025-12-30 | Win | (Thailand) Sitthichai Sitsongpeenong | KNOCK OUT.60 - K.O CLIMAX 2025 | Tokyo, Japan | Decision (Unanimous) | 3 | 3:00 |
Defends the KNOCK OUT Black Super Welterweight Championship.
| 2025-11-24 | Win | (Germany) Enriko Kehl | SHOOT BOXING 40th Anniversary | Tokyo, Japan | Decision (Unanimous) | 3 | 3:00 |
| 2025-10-11 | Win | (Thailand) Petchmai Siadammooplara | SHOOT BOXING 2025 act.5 | Tokyo, Japan | Decision (Unanimous) | 3 | 3:00 |
| 2025-06-22 | Loss | (Germany) Enriko Kehl | SHOOT BOXING 2025 act.3 | Tokyo, Japan | Decision (Unanimous) | 3 | 3:00 |
| 2025-05-23 | Loss | (Iran) Mohammad Siasarani | ONE Friday Fights 109, Lumpinee Stadium | Bangkok, Thailand | Decision (Unanimous) | 3 | 3:00 |
| 2024-12-26 | Win | (France) Guerric Billet | SHOOT BOXING Battle Summit: Ground Zero Tokyo 2024 | Tokyo, Japan | Decision (Unanimous) | 3 | 3:00 |
| 2024-10-13 | Win | (Georgia (country)) Davit Kiria | SHOOT BOXING 2024 act.5 | Tokyo, Japan | Decision (Unanimous) | 3 | 3:00 |
| 2024-08-17 | Win | (Bulgaria) Dragomir Petrov | SHOOT BOXING 2024 act.4 | Tokyo, Japan | TKO (Sweep/injury) | 2 | 0:51 |
| 2024-06-15 | Win | (Armenia) Arman Hambaryan | SHOOT BOXING 2024 act.3 | Tokyo, Japan | KO (Left hook) | 2 | 2:47 |
| 2024-04-13 | Win | (Thailand) Petchmorakot Petchyindee Academy | Shoot Boxing 2024 act.2 | Tokyo, Japan | Decision (Majority) | 5 | 3:00 |
Defends the SHOOT BOXING World Super Welterweight championship.
| 2024-02-10 | Loss | (Thailand) Petchmorakot Petchyindee Academy | Shoot Boxing 2024 act.1 | Tokyo, Japan | Ext.R Decision (Majority) | 4 | 3:00 |
| 2023-12-16 | Win | (France) James Condé | RISE World Series 2023 - Final Round | Tokyo, Japan | TKO (3 Knockdowns) | 1 | 2:06 |
| 2023-11-14 | Win | (Netherlands) Massaro Glunder | SHOOT BOXING 2023 Series Final | Tokyo, Japan | KO (Knee) | 1 | 2:48 |
| 2023-08-19 | Loss | (Morocco) Tyjani Beztati | Glory 87 | Rotterdam, Netherlands | Decision (Unanimous) | 5 | 3:00 |
For the Glory Lightweight Championship
| 2023-06-25 | Win | (Slovenia) Samo Petje | SHOOT BOXING 2023 act.3 | Tokyo, Japan | Decision (Unanimous) | 5 | 3:00 |
Wins the vacant SHOOT BOXING World Super Welterweight championship.
| 2023-03-26 | Win | (South Korea) Lee Sung-hyun | RISE ELDORADO 2023 | Tokyo, Japan | Decision (Unanimous) | 5 | 3:00 |
Wins the RISE Middleweight Championship.
| 2023-02-11 | Win | (Japan) Tsukuru Midorikawa | NO KICK NO LIFE | Tokyo, Japan | TKO (Referee stoppage) | 3 | 0:57 |
| 2022-12-25 | Win | (Bulgaria) Stoyan Koprivlenski | RISE WORLD SERIES / Glory Rivals 4 | Tokyo, Japan | Decision (Split) | 3 | 3:00 |
| 2022-09-17 | Win | (Belgium) Kendal Karakurt | SHOOT BOXING 2022 act.4 | Tokyo, Japan | 2nd Ext. R. Decision (Unanimous) | 5 | 3:00 |
| 2022-08-21 | Win | (Slovenia) Samo Petje | RISE WORLD SERIES OSAKA 2022 | Osaka, Japan | Ext.R Decision (Unanimous) | 4 | 3:00 |
| 2022-06-19 | Win | (Japan) Masaaki Noiri | THE MATCH 2022 | Tokyo, Japan | Ext.R Decision (Unanimous) | 4 | 3:00 |
| 2022-04-02 | Win | (Japan) BeyNoah | RISE El Dorado 2022 | Tokyo, Japan | KO (Left hook) | 1 | 0:41 |
| 2022-02-13 | Win | (Thailand) Chuchai Hadesworkout | SHOOT BOXING 2022 act.1 | Tokyo, Japan | KO (Left hook to the body) | 3 | 2:21 |
| 2021-12-26 | Win | (Thailand) Joe Fellowgym | SHOOT BOXING 2021 Champion Carnival | Tokyo, Japan | KO (Right Hook) | 2 | 2:08 |
| 2021-11-14 | Win | (Japan) Masashi Nakajima | RISE WORLD SERIES 2021 Osaka | Osaka, Japan | Decision (Unanimous) | 3 | 3:00 |
| 2021-09-04 | Win | (Thailand) Chansuk VertexGym | Shoot Boxing 2021 act.4 | Tokyo, Japan | Decision (Unanimous) | 3 | 3:00 |
| 2021-06-20 | Win | (Japan) Sho Kogane | Shoot Boxing 2021 act.3 | Tokyo, Japan | Decision (Unanimous) | 3 | 3:00 |
| 2021-04-10 | Win | (Nepal) Mohan Dragon | Shoot Boxing 2021 act.2 | Tokyo, Japan | Decision (Unanimous) | 3 | 3:00 |
| 2021-02-28 | Win | (Japan) Hinata | REBELS ～The FINAL～ | Tokyo, Japan | Decision (Majority) | 3 | 3:00 |
Wins REBELS Black Super Welterweight Championship. Later recognized as the KNOCK OUT Black Super Welterweight Championship.
| 2020-11-28 | Win | (Japan) Makoto Kitamura | Shoot Boxing 2020 act.2 | Tokyo, Japan | KO (Right high kick) | 3 | 0:14 |
| 2020-10-11 | Win | (Japan) Tsukuru Midorikawa | RISE DEAD or ALIVE Yokohama | Yokohama, Japan | Decision (Majority) | 3 | 3:00 |
| 2020-08-10 | Win | (Democratic Republic of the Congo) Daryl Lokoku | Rizin 23 – Yokohama | Yokohama, Japan | Decision (Unanimous) | 3 | 3:00 |
| 2020-02-15 | Loss | (Thailand) Pinphet Banchamek | SHOOT BOXING 2020 act.1 | Tokyo, Japan | 3rd Ext.R Decision (Split) | 8 | 3:00 |
| 2019-12-03 | Win | (Japan) BeyNoah | SHOOT BOXING GROUND ZERO TOKYO 2019 | Tokyo, Japan | Decision (Unanimous) | 5 | 3:00 |
| 2019-09-28 | Win | (Korea) Lee Sung-hyun | Shoot Boxing 2019 act.4 | Tokyo, Japan | Decision (Unanimous) | 5 | 3:00 |
| 2019-06-23 | Win | (Japan) Hiroki Nakajima | Shoot Boxing 2019 act.3 | Tokyo, Japan | TKO (Jumping Knee) | 4 | 2:55 |
| 2019-04-27 | Loss | (Australia) Chadd Collins | SHOOT BOXING 2019 act.2 | Tokyo, Japan | Decision (Unanimous) | 5 | 3:00 |
| 2019-02-11 | Win | (Thailand) Pongsiri P.K.Saenchaimuaythaigym | SHOOT BOXING 2019 act.1 | Tokyo, Japan | Decision (Unanimous) | 5 | 3:00 |
| 2018-12-09 | Win | (Japan) Yosuke Mizuochi | KING OF KNOCK OUT 2018 | Tokyo, Japan | TKO (Doctor Stoppage/Cut) | 3 | 1:58 |
| 2018-11-18 | Win | (Japan) UMA | SHOOT BOXING S-cup 65 kg World Tournament 2018, Final | Tokyo, Japan | TKO (Corner Stoppage) | 1 | 1:22 |
Wins the SHOOT BOXING S-Cup World Tournament title.
| 2018-11-18 | Win | (Japan) Kenta | SHOOT BOXING S-cup 65 kg World Tournament 2018, Semi Final | Tokyo, Japan | TKO (Doctor Stoppage) | 3 | 0:42 |
| 2018-11-18 | Win | (Korea) Cho Gyeon Jae | SHOOT BOXING S-cup 65 kg World Tournament 2018, Quarter Final | Tokyo, Japan | TKO (2 Knockdowns/Left Cross) | 1 | 2:16 |
| 2018-09-15 | Loss | (Thailand) Chamuaktong Fightermuaythai | SHOOT BOXING 2018 act.4 | Tokyo, Japan | Ext.R Decision (Majority) | 6 | 3:00 |
| 2018-08-12 | Win | (Japan) Sho Ogawa | Rizin 12 | Nagoya, Japan | Decision (Unanimous) | 3 | 3:00 |
| 2018-07-29 | Win | (Japan) Yoshiya Uzatsuyo | Rizin 11 | Saitama, Japan | KO (Knee to the head) | 3 | 3:00 |
| 2018-06-10 | Win | (Thailand) Jaowear Sirilakgym | SHOOT BOXING 2018 act.3 | Tokyo, Japan | KO (Punches) | 1 | 2:43 |
| 2018-04-01 | Win | (Japan) Fukashi | SHOOT BOXING 2018 act.2 | Tokyo, Japan | TKO (Doctor Stoppage/Cut) | 4 | 2:45 |
| 2018-02-10 | Win | (Thailand) Tapruwan Hadesworkout | SHOOT BOXING 2018 act.1 | Tokyo, Japan | KO (Punches and Knees) | 4 | 2:36 |
| 2017-11-22 | Win | (Japan) Kenta | SHOOT BOXING BATTLE SUMMIT-GROUND ZERO TOKYO 2017 | Tokyo, Japan | Decision (Majority) | 3 | 3:00 |
Wins the vacant SHOOT BOXING Japan Super Lightweight Championship.
| 2017-11-22 | Win | (Japan) Yuya | SHOOT BOXING BATTLE SUMMIT-GROUND ZERO TOKYO 2017 | Tokyo, Japan | Decision (Unanimous) | 3 | 3:00 |
| 2017-09-16 | Win | (Japan) Keijiro Miyakoshi | SHOOT BOXING 2017 act.4 | Tokyo, Japan | TKO (Doctor Stoppage) | 5 | 2:46 |
| 2017-09-16 | Win | (Japan) Hiroaki Suzuki | SHOOT BOXING 2017 act.3 | Tokyo, Japan | TKO (Doctor Stoppage/Cut) | 1 | 2:18 |
| 2017-04-08 | Loss | (Netherlands) Zakaria Zouggary | SHOOT BOXING 2017 act.2 | Tokyo, Japan | Decision (Majority) | 5 | 3:00 |
| 2017-03-12 | Win | (Japan) Hiroto Iwasaki | Shizuoka Kick vol.3 | Shizuoka, Japan | Ext.R Decision (Split) | 4 | 3:00 |
| 2017-02-11 | NC | (Japan) YUSHI | SHOOT BOXING 2017 act.1 | Tokyo, Japan | Overturned decision | 3 | 3:00 |
| 2016-12-23 | Win | (China) Liu Ya | Liberty War II | China | Decision (Majority) | 3 | 3:00 |
| 2016-09-19 | Win | (Japan) Kiyoto | SHOOT BOXING 2016 act.4 | Tokyo, Japan | TKO (Knees) | 2 | 2:28 |
| 2016-06-05 | Win | (Japan) Hiroaki Oyama | SHOOT BOXING 2016 act.3 | Tokyo, Japan | Decision (Unanimous) | 3 | 3:00 |
| 2016-02-13 | Win | (Japan) Yukimitsu Takahashi | SHOOT BOXING 2016 act.1 | Tokyo, Japan | Decision (Unanimous) | 3 | 3:00 |
| 2015-10-03 | Win | (Japan) Rukiya Anpo | SHOOTBOXING THE LAST BOMB | Osaka, Japan | KO (Front Kick) | 2 | 2:59 |
| 2015-08-22 | Win | (Japan) Taiki Tsuchiya | SHOOT BOXING 30th ANNIVERSARY "CAESAR TIME!" | Tokyo, Japan | Ext.R Decision (Majority) | 4 | 3:00 |
| 2015-06-21 | Win | (Japan) Yuji Sugawara | SHOOT BOXING 2015～SB 30th Anniversary～ act.3 | Tokyo, Japan | Decision (Majority) | 3 | 3:00 |
| 2015-04-18 | Loss | (Japan) Koji Ikegami | SHOOT BOXING 2015～SB 30th Anniversary～ act.2 | Tokyo, Japan | Decision (Majority) | 3 | 3:00 |
| 2015-02-21 | Win | (Japan) TASUKU | SHOOT BOXING 2015～SB 30th Anniversary～ act.1 | Tokyo, Japan | Decision (Unanimous) | 3 | 3:00 |
| 2015-01-24 | Loss | (Japan) Koudai Nobe | RISE 103 | Tokyo, Japan | Decision (Unanimous) | 3 | 3:00 |
| 2014-11-30 | Win | (Japan) Teruto Ishihara | SHOOT BOXING S-cup 65 kg World Tournament 2018 | Tokyo, Japan | Ext.R Decision (Majority) | 4 | 3:00 |
| 2014-09-20 | Win | (Japan) Kazuki Tamakawa | SHOOT BOXING 2014 act.4 | Tokyo, Japan | Decision (Unanimous) | 3 | 3:00 |
| 2014-07-27 | Win | (Japan) MASATO | J-NETWORK J-FIGHT in SHINJUKU～vol.38, Final | Tokyo, Japan | Decision (Majority) | 2 | 3:00 |
Wins the Next Generation Cup -62kg Tournament.
| 2014-07-27 | Win | (Japan) Hideki | J-NETWORK J-FIGHT in SHINJUKU～vol.38, Semi Final | Tokyo, Japan | Decision (Unanimous) | 2 | 3:00 |
| 2014-07-27 | Win | (Japan) RS YUTAKA | J-NETWORK J-FIGHT in SHINJUKU～vol.38, Quarter Final | Tokyo, Japan | KO (Right Low Kick) | 1 | 2:35 |
| 2014-06-21 | Win | (Japan) Tetsuyuki Uemura | SHOOT BOXING 2014 act.3 | Tokyo, Japan | TKO (Towel Thrown) | 1 | 1:55 |
| 2014-04-18 | Win | (Japan) Takahito Suzuki | SHOOT BOXING 2014 act.2 | Tokyo, Japan | TKO (Towel Thrown) | 3 | 1:20 |
| 2014-02-23 | Win | (Japan) Jun Kitagawa | SHOOT BOXING 2014 act.1 | Tokyo, Japan | TKO (Referee stoppage) | 3 | 2:33 |
Legend: Win Loss Draw/No contest Notes

Amateur Kickboxing Record
| Date | Result | Opponent | Event | Location | Method | Round | Time |
|---|---|---|---|---|---|---|---|
| 2013-09-22 | Win | (Japan) Yuto Shinohara | DEEP KICK 17 | Osaka, Japan | Decision | 3 | 2:00 |
Wins the TOP RUN 65kg title.
| 2013-05-12 | Win | (Japan) Yuma Ueki | DEEP KICK 15 | Osaka, Japan | Decision | 3 | 2:00 |
Wins the TOP RUN 60kg title.
| 2013-04-14 | Draw | (Japan) Ryo Yuasa | NEXT LEVEL Kansai 6 | Osaka, Japan | Decision | 2 | 2:00 |
| 2013-02-10 | Loss | (Japan) Yuto Shinohara | DEEP KICK 14 | Osaka, Japan | Decision | 3 | 2:00 |
For the TOP RUN 60kg title.
| 2012-12-16 | Win | (Japan) Kazuhiro Fukuzumi | NEXT LEVEL Kansai 3 | Osaka, Japan | Decision (Unanimous) | 2 | 2:00 |
| 2012-09-23 | Draw | (Japan) Yuto Shinohara | NEXT LEVEL Kansai 1 | Osaka, Japan | Decision | 2 | 2:00 |
| 2012-04-15 | Win | (Japan) Yuichi Suenaga | All Japan Jr. Kick Tournament, Final | Osaka, Japan | Decision | 2 | 2:00 |
Wins All Japan Jr. Kick 55kg title.
| 2012-04-15 | Win | (Japan) Rasta Kido | All Japan Jr. Kick Tournament, Semi Final | Osaka, Japan | Decision | 2 | 2:00 |
| 2012-04-15 | Win | (Japan) | All Japan Jr. Kick Tournament, Quarter Final | Osaka, Japan | Decision | 2 | 2:00 |
| 2012-03-04 | Win | (Japan) Tsukasa Nijou | Double Impact | Osaka, Japan | Decision | 2 | 2:00 |
| 2011-09-11 | Win | (Japan) Ren Hiramoto | 2011 M-1 Freshmans vol.3 - M-1 vs NEXT LEVEL Unification | Tokyo, Japan | Decision (Majority) | 3 | 2:00 |
Legend: Win Loss Draw/No contest Notes

== See also ==
- List of male kickboxers
