= Kouzi (kickboxer) =

Japanese kickboxer

- Born: Kōji Tanaka (田中宏治); May 6, 1989 (age 37); Osaka, Japan
- Other names: Emperor
- Nationality: Japanese
- Height: 173 cm (5 ft 8 in)
- Weight: 60.0 kg (132.3 lb; 9.45 st)
- Division: Super Featherweight
- Style: Nippon Kempo, Kickboxing
- Stance: Orthodox
- Fighting out of: Tokyo, Japan
- Team: Silver Wolf
- Years active: 2009–present

Kickboxing record
- Total: 51
- Wins: 31
- By knockout: 10
- Losses: 17
- By knockout: 1
- Draws: 2
- No contests: 1

Mixed martial arts record
- Total: 2
- Wins: 1
- By knockout: 1
- Losses: 1
- By decision: 1

Kōji Tanaka (田中宏治, Tanaka Kōji), better known as Kouzi (皇治, Kōji), is a retired Japanese kickboxer, fought out of Japan. As of July 2021, he was the #7 ranked Bantamweight according to Combat Press. He's been ranked since May 2019.

== Kickboxing career ==
Koji lost to Taiga by decision in June 2017.

In February 2017, Koji fought Mohamed Boulef for the ISKA World Lightweight title. He beat Boulef by unanimous decision.

He was scheduled to fight Kotaro Shimano in September 2017. Koji won the fight by unanimous decision.

Koji participated in the 2018 Super Featherweight Grand Prix. He beat Hirotaka Urabe by decision in the quarterfinals, and lost to Kosuke Komiyama in the semifinals by decision in turn.

He fought Stavros Exakoustidis in September 2018. Koji won the fight by split decision after an extra round was fought.

In December 2018 he fought Takeru Segawa for the K-1 Super Featherweight title. Takeru won the fight by unanimous decision.

Koji was scheduled to fight Jan Szajko during K'Festa 2. He beat Szajko by unanimous decision.

Kouzi fought Tatsuya Oiwa during K-1 World GP 2019: Japan vs World 5 vs 5. The fight went into an extra fourth round, after which Kouzi won a split decision.

He fought Seiya Kawahara during K-1's 2019 Yokohama Matsuri event. Seiya was dominant throughout the majority of the first round, before Koji dropped him seconds before the end of the end of the round. Koji would go on to win the fight, and was awarded Combat Press' "Comeback of the Year".

=== Rizin FF ===
Koji was under exclusive contract with K-1, but he opted to pay contractual penalties in order to sign with Rizin FF. In his promotional debut Koji fought Tenshin Nasukawa during Rizin 24 - Saitama. Tenshin won the fight by unanimous decision. Koji was next scheduled to fight Takanori Gomi in a special rules bout, at Rizin 26. Gomi's weight limit was 75 kg and Koji's 65 kg. The rules of the bout forbid grappling and kicking, while both fighters wore 12oz gloves. Koji lost the bout via majority decision.

Koji faced Genji Umeno in the semifinal bout of a four-man kickboxing tournament, held during the Rizin 29 – Osaka event. The idea for the kickboxing Grand Prix came from Kouzi, wanting RIZIN to concentrate more on kickboxing. Going into the Grand Prix, Kouzi believed he will have a good showing saying, "This will be the ultimate public masturbation for me that only I can make happen." 43 seconds into his fight with Umeno, there was an inadvertent clash of heads which left Umeno unable to continue fighting. Accordingly, Koji advanced to the finals, where he met Taiju Shiratori. Shiratori won the final bout by unanimous decision. Koji was later hospitalized with a fractured fundus, which required surgery. He successfully underwent surgery on July 2, 2021.

Koji faced Kazuma Sone at Rizin 32 - Okinawa on November 20, 2021. He won the bout via unanimous decision.

Koji faced YA-MAN at Rizin 33 - Saitama on December 31, 2021. He lost the fight by majority decision.

Koji was booked to face Genji Umeno in a rematch at Rizin 34 – Osaka on March 20, 2022. He won the fight by majority decision.

On April 1, 2023, following his split decision loss to Ryusei Ashizawa at Rizin 41 – Osaka, Kouzi announced his retirement from professional competition.

Making his MMA debut, Koji faced Kota Miura on December 31, 2023 at Rizin 45, winning the bout via TKO stoppage in the second round.

== Titles and accomplishments ==
- International Sport Kickboxing Association
  - 2017 ISKA K-1 World Lightweight Champion
- HEAT
  - 2013 HEAT Kick Lightweight Champion
- TRIBELATE
  - 2012 TRIBELATE Kick Super Featherweight Champion

Awards

- CombatPress.com
  - 2019 Comeback of the Year vs. Seiya Kawahara

== Mixed martial arts record ==
Professional record breakdown
2 matches	1 win	1 loss
By knockout	1	0
By decision	0	1

Res.	Record	Opponent	Method	Event	Date	Round	Time	Location	Notes
Loss	1–1	Ryusei Ashizawa	Decision (unanimous)	Super Rizin 3	July 28, 2024	3	5:00	Saitama, Japan	Bantamweight debut.
Win	1–0	Kota Miura	TKO (punches and soccer kicks)	Rizin 45	December 31, 2023	2	0:59	Saitama, Japan	Catchweight (143 lb) bout. Rizin MMA Special rules (5x2 minutes).

== Kickboxing record ==
Professional Kickboxing Record
31 Wins (10 (T)KO's), 17 Losses, 2 Draws, 1 No Contest
Date	Result	Opponent	Event	Location	Method	Round	Time
2026-12-29		(Japan) Kiyomitsu Samuel Nagasawa	K-1 World MAX 2026 - World Championship Tournament Final	Yokohama, Japan			
For the K-1 Lightweight (-62.5kg) title.
2023-04-01	Loss	(Japan) Ryusei Ashizawa	Rizin 41 – Osaka	Osaka, Japan	Decision (Split)	3	3:00
2022-05-07	Win	(Thailand) Daosakorn Mor.Tassanai	HEAT 50	Nagoya, Japan	Decision (Overturned)	4	3:00
2022-03-20	Win	(Japan) Genji Umeno	Rizin 34 – Osaka	Tokyo, Japan	Decision (Majority)	3	3:00
2021-12-31	Loss	(Japan) YA-MAN	Rizin 33 - Saitama	Saitama, Japan	Decision (Majority)	3	3:00
2021-11-20	Win	(Japan) Kazuma Sone	Rizin 32 - Okinawa	Okinawa, Japan	Decision (Unanimous)	3	3:00
2021-06-27	Loss	(Japan) Taiju Shiratori	Rizin 29 – Osaka, Tournament Final	Osaka, Japan	Decision (Unanimous)	3	3:00
2021-06-27	NC	(Japan) Genji Umeno	Rizin 29 – Osaka, Tournament Semifinal	Osaka, Japan	Doctor stop (head clash)	1	0:43
Kouzi advances to the final following an unintentional headbutt which left Umeno unable to continue.
2020-09-27	Loss	(Japan) Tenshin Nasukawa	Rizin 24 - Saitama	Saitama, Japan	Decision (Unanimous)	3	3:00
2019-11-24	Win	(Japan) Seiya Kawahara	K-1 WORLD GP 2019 JAPAN Yokohama Matsuri	Yokohama, Japan	KO (Punches)	2	2:59
2019-08-24	Win	(Japan) Tatsuya Oiwa	K-1 World GP 2019: Japan vs World 5 vs 5 & Special Superfight in Osaka	Osaka, Japan	Ext.R Decision (Split)	4	3:00
2019-03-10	Win	(Germany) Jan Szajko	K-1 World GP 2019: K’FESTA 2	Saitama, Japan	Decision (Unanimous)	3	3:00
2018-12-08	Loss	(Japan) Takeru	K-1 World GP 2018: K-1 Lightweight World's Strongest Tournament	Osaka, Japan	Decision (Unanimous)	3	3:00
For the K-1 -60kg title.
2018-09-24	Win	(Greece) Stavros Exakoustidis	K-1 World GP 2018: inaugural Cruiserweight Championship Tournament	Saitama, Japan	Ext.R Decision (Split)	4	3:00
2018-03-21	Loss	(Japan) Kosuke Komiyama	K-1 World GP 2018: K'FESTA.1 -60 kg World Tournament Semi Finals	Saitama, Japan	Decision (Unanimous)	3	3:00
2018-03-21	Win	(Japan) Hirotaka Urabe	K-1 World GP 2018: K'FESTA.1 -60 kg World Tournament Quarter Finals	Saitama, Japan	Ext.R Decision (Unanimous)	4	3:00
2017-09-18	Win	(Japan) Kotaro Shimano	K-1 World GP 2016 -60kg World Tournament	Tokyo, Japan	Decision (Unanimous)	3	3:00
2017-06-18	Loss	(Japan) Taiga	K-1 World GP 2017 Super Welterweight Championship Tournament	Tokyo, Japan	Decision (Unanimous)	3	3:00
2017-02-19	Win	(Belgium) Mohamed Boulef	HEAT 39	Nagoya, Japan	Decision (Unanimous)	5	3:00
Wins the ISKA World Lightweight title.
2016-09-19	Win	(Japan) Toshi	K-1 World GP 2016 -60kg World Tournament	Tokyo, Japan	Decision (Unanimous)	3	3:00
2016-04-24	Loss	(Japan) Koya Urabe	K-1 World GP 2016 -60kg Japan Tournament, Quarter Finals	Tokyo, Japan	Decision (Unanimous)	3	3:00
2016-02-05	Win	(Japan) Syun Kentoshi	Krush.63	Nagoya, Japan	KO (Left High Kick)	2	1:26
2015-11-29	Win	(Korea) Jo Seong-hyeon	HEAT 36	Nagoya, Japan	TKO (3 Knockdowns)	3	2:30
Defends HEAT Kick rule Lightweight title.
2015-09-27	Loss	(Japan) Yuya	NJKF 2015 6th	Tokyo, Japan	Decision (Unanimous)	5	3:00
For the WBC Muay Thai Japan Lightweight title.
2015-06-07	Loss	(Japan) Fukashi	Bigbang 21	Tokyo, Japan	Decision (Majority)	3	3:00
For the BigBang Lightweight title.
2014-12-21	Win	(Korea) Kim Jin Hyeok	HEAT 34	Kobe, Japan	Decision (Majority)	5	3:00
Defends HEAT Kick rule Lightweight title.
2014-07-25	Loss	(Japan) SHIGERU	RISE cooperation REBELS.28	Tokyo, Japan	Decision (Unanimous)	3	3:00
2014-02-23	Win	(China) Guo Chen	HEAT 30	Kobe, Japan	KO (Left Hook to the Body)	2	2:56
2013-12-15	Win	(Japan) Yuya	HEAT 29, Heat Kick 1 Day Lightweight Tournament, Final	Tokyo, Japan	Ext.R Decision (Unanimous)	4	3:00
Wins HEAT Kick rule Lightweight title.
2013-12-15	Win	(Japan) Kouki	HEAT 29, Heat Kick 1 Day Lightweight Tournament, Semi Finals	Tokyo, Japan	Ext.R TKO	4	1:55
2013-10-13	Win	(Korea) Jian Yon Ho	SFK～7th anniversary～ ×REBELS -SPIRIT FIRE KOBE-	Osaka, Japan	TKO (Left hook to the body)	2	1:28
2013-07-21	Loss	(Japan) Hikaru Machida	REBELS.18, 60 kg Championship Tournament Semi Finals	Tokyo, Japan	Decision (Majority)	3	3:00
2013-03-10	Win	(Japan) TASUKU	Road to GLORY JAPAN	Tokyo, Japan	Decision (Unanimous)	3	3:00
2013-01-26	Loss	(Japan) Shota Kanbe	Krush.26, -58 kg Tournament Quarter Finals	Tokyo, Japan	Decision (Majority)	3	3:00
2012-12-09	Loss	(Japan) Hisaaki Nakamukai	J-NETWORK J-NEXUS 2012 ～Kette ii Tomo!～	Tokyo, Japan	Decision	3	3:00
2012-08-26	Loss	(Japan) Taison Maeguchi	J-KICK 2012～NEXT J-GENERATION～4th	Tokyo, Japan	Ext.R Decision (Split)	4	3:00
2012-07-14	Win	(Japan) Tsuyoshi Nakashima	Krush-EX 2012 vol.4	Tokyo, Japan	Decision	3	3:00
2012-04-28	Win	(Japan) Ryoma Hasumi	TRIBELATE vol.36～Title Match Festival～	Tokyo, Japan	Decision (Unanimous)	3	3:00
Wins TRIBELATE Kick Super Featherweight title.
2012-04-01	Win	(Japan) Motohiro Shinohara	J-NETWORK J-FIGHT in SHINJUKU ～vol.25	Tokyo, Japan	KO	2	1:33
2011-11-27	Win	(Japan) Reiou	J-NETWORK J-F-X ～TIME to CHANGE the KICK by J-SPIRIT EX.～	Tokyo, Japan	TKO	1	1:49
2011-10-10	Loss	(Japan) Shoudai Kitazono	KING OF STRIKERS Round 6	Fukuoka, Japan	KO	3	
2011-09-18	Loss	(Japan) Ryuji Washio	J-NETWORK J-FIGHT in SHINJUKU～vol.23～	Tokyo, Japan	Decision (Unanimous)	3	3:00
2011-07-18	Win	(Japan) Koki Ota	DEMOLITION 2 DAYS ～day 2nd Kick Boxing～ – HIGH SPEED –	Osaka, Japan	KO (Right Cross)	2	2:35
2010-12-12	Win	(Japan) Shohei Nishimura	DEEP☆KICK 5	Osaka, Japan	KO	2	2:05
2010-08-08	Win	(Japan) Yuto Tsujide	DEEP☆KICK 4	Osaka, Japan	Decision (Unanimous)	3	3:00
2010-06-13	Loss	(Japan) Ken Saenchaigym	NJKF BANZAI ATTACK I	Tokyo, Japan	Decision	3	3:00
2010-04-04	Loss	(Japan) Yuki Kyotani	DEEP☆KICK 3	Osaka, Japan	Decision (Unanimous)	3	3:00
2009-12-23	Win	(Japan) Ichiji Minami	Yuichiro Nagashima produce DEEP KICK 2	Osaka, Japan	Decision (Split)	3	3:00
2009-10-11	Win	(Japan) Takashi Fujita	NAGOYA KICK～BoogieFight09 VACANCY～	Osaka, Japan	Decision (Unanimous)	3	3:00
2009-07-05	Win	(Japan) Takeshi Kai	Yuichiro Nagashima produce DEEP KICK	Osaka, Japan	Decision (Unanimous)	3	3:00
2009-05-10	Draw	(Japan) Daiki Kato	NAGOYA KICK～BoogieFight08 Sandcastle～	Aichi, Japan	Decision	3	3:00
2009-03-08	Draw	(Japan) Akitaka Sugiyama	NAGOYAKICK～BoogieFight07 Black Sunday～	Aichi, Japan	Decision	3	3:00
	Win	(Japan) Fujita	S-1	Japan	KO		
Legend: Win Loss Draw/No contest Notes

== Exhibition boxing record ==
5 fights	1 win	1 loss
By knockout	1	0
By decision	0	1
Non-scored	3	

No.	Result	Record	Opponent	Type	Round, time	Date	Age	Location	Notes
6	—N/a	1–1 (4)	Sina Karimian	—N/a	3	May 4, 2025	35 years, 363 days	Tokyo Dome, Tokyo, Japan	Non-scored bout. Rizin Special standing bout rules.
5	—N/a	1–1 (3)	Buakaw Banchamek	—N/a	3	19 Oct 2024	35 years, 166 days	Yokohama Buntai, Yokohama, Japan	Non-scored bout
4	—N/a	1–1 (2)	J'Hon Ingram	—N/a	3	13 Nov 2022	33 years, 191 days	Coca-Cola Arena, Dubai, UAE	Non-scored bout
3	Win	1–1 (1)	Ray Sadeghi	TKO	3 (3), 0:50	Sep 25, 2022	33 years, 142 days	Saitama Super Arena, Saitama, Japan	
2	—N/a	0–1 (1)	Hiroki Fukushige	—N/a	3	Aug 14, 2022	33 years, 100 days	Edion Arena, Osaka, Japan	Non-scored bout
1	Loss	0–1	Takanori Gomi	MD	3	Dec 31, 2020	31 years, 239 days	Saitama Super Arena, Saitama, Japan	

== See also ==
- List of male kickboxers
