= Fukashi Mizutani =

Japanese kickboxer

Fukashi
- Born: Fukashi Mizutani (水谷 深); June 17, 1991 (age 35); Fukuoka, Japan
- Other names: Fukashi (ふかし)
- Nationality: Japanese
- Height: 175 cm (5 ft 9 in)
- Weight: 65.0 kg (143.3 lb; 10.24 st)
- Style: Kickboxing, Muay Thai
- Stance: Orthodox
- Fighting out of: Tokyo, Japan
- Team: Crosspoint Kichijoji
- Years active: 2008-present

Kickboxing record
- Total: 68
- Wins: 44
- By knockout: 20
- Losses: 21
- By knockout: 6
- Draws: 3

Fukashi Mizutani (不可思, born 17 June 1991), known simply as Fukashi (ふかし), is a Japanese kickboxer, currently competing in the super lightweight division of K-1. A professional competitor since 2008, he previously competed for KNOCKOUT, where he was the super lightweight champion, and RISE, where he was the RISE lightweight champion.

== Kickboxing career ==
=== Early career ===
Fukashi made his professional debut against Kazuo Mito at K-1 Koshien KING OF UNDER 18～FINAL 16～ on August 29, 2008. He won the fight by a second-round knockout. He amassed a 15-5-1 record over the course of the next five years, before taking part in a 2013 REBELS 60 kg tournament. He would beat Tatsuya Inaishi by decision in the semifinals, but lost to Hikaru Machida by decision in the finals.

=== BigBang Lightweight champion ===
Fukashi was scheduled to fight Tatsuya Inaishi for the BigBang Lightweight title at Bigbang 18 on September 7, 2014. He won the fight by majority decision, with scores of 30-30, 30-29 and 30-29.

Fukashi was scheduled to face Kazuki Koyano at REBELS.31 on October 26, 2014. He won the fight by unanimous decision, with all three judges awarding him a 30-29 scorecard.

Fukashi participated in the BLADE FC lightweight tournament, held at BLADE FC 1 on December 29, 2014. He was scheduled to face Sho Ogawa in the tournament quarterfinals. Fukashi won the fight by unanimous decision, with all three judges scoring the fight as 30-27 for him, and advanced to the semifinals where he faced SHIGERU. SHIGERU won the semifinal bout by unanimous decision, thus eliminating Fukashi from the tournament.

Fukashi was scheduled to face Takuma Sato at REBELS.34×WPMF JAPAN on March 4, 2015. Fukashi won the fight by a first-round knockout, stopping him with a left hook at the 2:05 minute mark.

Fukashi was scheduled to make the first defense of his BigBang title against Kouzi at Bigbang・Touitsu he no michi sono 21 on June 7, 2015. He won the fight by majority decision, with scores of 29-29, 30-29 and 29-28.

Fukashi was scheduled to make his second career RISE appearance against TASUKU at RISE 106 on July 24, 2015. He won the fight by a third-round knockout.

=== WPMF Japan Super Lightweight champion ===
Fukashi was scheduled to face Tsuyoshi Kato at REBELS.38 on September 16, 2015. He knocked Kato out with a right straight at the very last second of the third round.

Fukashi was scheduled to face Shohei Asahara RISE 108 on November 8, 2015. He won the fight by majority decision, with scores of 30-29, 29-29 and 29-28.

Fukashi was scheduled to make his first WPMF Japan title defense against Nobu Bravely at KODO 1 on January 24, 2016. He won the fight by a fifth-round technical knockout. Nobu stopped defending himself midway through the round, which forced the referee to stop the fight.

Fukashi was scheduled to face Pietro Doorje at REBELS.41 on March 9, 2016. The fight was ruled a unanimous decision draw.

Fukashi was scheduled to face Balis Karabas at SHOOT BOXING 2016 act.3 on June 5, 2016. He won the fight by a third-round head kick knockout.

=== RISE Lightweight champion ===
==== Title reign ====
Fukashi was scheduled to challenge the reigning RISE Lightweight champion Hiroshi Mizumachi at RISE 112 on July 30, 2016. He won the fight by unanimous decision, with scores of 49-48, 50-46 and 50-48. Fukashi scored the sole knockdown of the fight in the fifth round, when he dropped Mizumatchi with a low kick.

Fukashi was scheduled to face Hachimaki for the REBELS Red Super Lightweight championship at REBELS.47 on November 30, 2016. Fukashi won the fight by a fifth-round right hook knockout. The knockout was preceded by two knockdowns during the fifth round, as Fukashi dropped his opponent with a flying knee and a head kick.

Fukashi was scheduled to face the WBC Muaythai Japan and Innovation Super Lightweight champion Hiroto Yamaguchi at KNOCK OUT vol.1 on February 12, 2017. He won the fight by a third-round head kick knockout.

Fukashi was scheduled to face Yosuke Mizuochi at KNOCK OUT vol.2 on April 1, 2017. He won the fight by technical knockout, due to doctor stoppage.

Fukashi was scheduled to face Katsuji at KNOCK OUT vol.3 on June 17, 2017, in the quarterfinals of the KNOCK OUT lightweight tournament. He lost the fight by a fifth-round technical knockout, due to doctor stoppage.

Fukashi was scheduled to face Shunsuke Motegi at KNOCK OUT vol.4 on August 20, 2017. He won the fight by a fourth-round technical knockout, after Motegi's corner threw in the towel at the 0:53 minute mark.

Fukashi was scheduled to make his first, and only, RISE title defense against Shohei Asahara at RISE 119 on September 15, 2017. He won the fight by unanimous decision, with all three judges awarding him a 49-47 scorecard.

==== KNOCK OUT Super Lightweight tournament ====
Fukashi was scheduled to face Masanori Kanehara at KING OF KNOCK OUT 2017 on December 10, 2017. He won the fight by unanimous decision, with scores of 49-48, 49-47 and 49-47.

Fukashi was scheduled to face the three-time NJKF champion Kenta Yamada at KNOCK OUT FIRST IMPACT on February 12, 2018, in the quarterfinals of the 2018 KNOCK OUT Super Lightweight tournament. He won the closely contested bout by majority decision, with scores of 50-49, 49-49 and 50-49.

Fukashi made his return to Shootboxing against the Shootboxing Super Lightweight champion Kaito Ono at SHOOT BOXING 2018 act.2 on April 1, 2018. He lost the fight by a fourth-round technical knockout, after the ringside doctor stopped the fight due to a cut on his forehead.

Fukashi faced the former two-weight Shootboxing champion Hiroaki Suzuki at KNOCK OUT 2018 Survival Days on June 8, 2018, in the semifinals of the KNOCK OUT Super Lightweight tournament. He won the fight by unanimous decision, with scores of 50-46, 49-46 and 50-44. Fukashi advanced to the tournament finals, held at KNOCK OUT SUMMER FES.2018 on August 19, 2018, where he faced Hideki. He won the fight by majority decision, with scores of 50-49, 48-48 and 49-48.

==== Later KNOCK OUT career ====
Fukashi was scheduled to face Yuma Yamaguchi at KING OF KNOCK OUT 2018 on December 9, 2018. He won the fight by majority decision, with scores of 50-48, 49-48 and 49-49.

Fukashi was scheduled to face Chadd Collins at KNOCK OUT 2019 WINTER THE ANSWER IS IN THE RING on February 11, 2019. He lost the fight by unanimous decision.

Fukashi was scheduled to face the reigning Shootboxing Lightweight champion Renta Nishioka in a non-title bout at SHOOT BOXING 2019 act.2 on April 27, 2019. He lost the fight by unanimous decision.

=== K-1 ===
==== Title run ====
Fukashi made his promotional debut with K-1 against the former Krush Lightweight champion Daizo Sasaki at K-1 World GP 2019: Super Bantamweight World Tournament on June 30, 2019. He was unconcerned with his opponent, stating during the pre-fight press conference that Sasaki had "a basic fighting style". Fukashi suffered a cut above his right eye in the third round, after Sasaki hit him with the spinning back fist, which prompted the referee to call in the ringside doctor. Fukashi was allowed to continue fighting, before the doctor was called in two additional times, with the referee finally stopping the fight at the 2:14 minute mark. Sasaki was awarded the technical knockout victory, due to doctor stoppage. Although Fukashi complained that he was hit with the forearm instead of the back of the fist, both the referee and K-1 producer Takumi Nakamura deemed the strike to have been legal.

Fukashi was scheduled to face Tsubasa Horii at Krush.106 on October 13, 2019, in his first career Krush appearance. Horii was seen as a step down in competition compared to his previous opponents. Fukashi won the fight by a third-round knockout. He first staggered Horii with a counter right straight, before following up with a series of punches. He was able to finish his opponent in the very last second of the fight.

Fukashi was scheduled to fight the 2010 K-1 MAX Japan tournament winner Tetsuya Yamato at K-1 World GP 2019 Japan: ～Women's Flyweight Championship Tournament～ on December 28, 2019. He won the fight by a third-round technical knockout. Although Yamato was able to beat the eight count, the referee decided to stop the fight, deeming him unable to continue fighting. Fukashi called out the reigning K-1 Super lightweight champion Rukiya Anpo during his post-fight interview.

Fukashi was scheduled to challenge the reigning champion Rukiya Anpo at K-1: K’Festa 3 on March 22, 2020. Anpo initially missed weight by 150g during the first weight-ins, but was able to make weight during the second weigh-ins, half an hour later. Anpo was in poor physical condition afterwards, and was unable to attend the press conference. Fukashi lost the fight by unanimous decision, with scores of 30-27, 30-27 and 29-28. He was additionally knocked down with a right straight at the very end of the first round.

==== Later K-1 career ====
Fukashi was scheduled to face Jin Hirayama at K-1 World GP 2020 in Osaka on September 22, 2020. Hirayama won the fight by a wide unanimous decision, with all three judges awarding him a 30-24 scorecard. Fukashi was knocked down in both the first and second round.

Fukashi was scheduled to face Hayato Suzuki at K-1 World GP 2020 Winter's Crucial Bout on December 13, 2020. He knocked down, and then knocked out, Suzuki with a second-round right straight.

Fukashi was scheduled to face the reigning K-1 super lightweight champion Hideaki Yamazaki in a non-title bout at K-1: K'Festa 4 Day 1 on March 21, 2021. He was complimentary of his opponent, and claimed it was "...an honor and privilege to fight Yamazaki". Yamazaki won the fight by a first-round knockout, stopping Fukashi with a jab at the 1:10 minute mark of the bout.

Fukashi was scheduled to face the journeyman Yosuke Tamura at K-1 World GP 2021 in Fukuoka on July 17, 2021. Fukashi won the fight by a first-round technical knockout, successfully dropping Tamura thrice before the second minute of the round had elapsed.

Fukashi was scheduled to face the former K-1 lightweight champion Kenta Hayashi at K-1 World GP 2021 in Osaka on December 4, 2021. He lost the fight by unanimous decision. Although he was up on the scorecards heading into the third round, Fukashi suffered a knockdown in the last round, which resulted in a 10-8 round for his opponent.

Fukashi was booked to face Ruku Kojima at K-1: K'Festa 5 on April 3, 2022. He won the fight by a third-round technical knockout, forcing Kojima's corner to throw in the towel at the 2:15 minute mark of the last round.

Fukashi faced Yushiro Ohno at K-1 World GP 2022 Yokohamatsuri on September 11, 2022. He won the fight by a third-round technical knockout. Fukashi knocked Ohno down three times, once in the second and twice in the third round, before the referee stepped in and waved the bout off.

Fukashi faced the former K-1 Lightweight champion Kenta Hayashi in a rematch at K-1 World GP 2022 in Osaka on December 3, 2022. He lost the fight by unanimous decision, with scores of 30–28, 30–28 and 30–27.

Fukashi faced the Knock Out BLACK Lightweight champion Bazooka Koki in a non-title -64.5 kg catchweight bout at KNOCK OUT 2023 SUPER BOUT BLAZE on March 5, 2023. He thrice knocked Koki down in the third round for a technical knockout victory.

== Titles and accomplishments ==
- KNOCK OUT
  - 2018 KNOCK OUT Super Lightweight Championship
- REBELS
  - 2016 REBELS Red Super Lightweight Championship
- RISE
  - 2016 RISE Lightweight Championship
- World Professional Muaythai Federation
  - 2015 WPMF Japan Super Lightweight Championship
- BigBang
  - 2014 BigBang Lightweight Championship

== Fight record ==
Professional Kickboxing Record
44 Wins (20 (T)KO's), 21 Losses, 3 Draws, 0 No Contest
Date	Result	Opponent	Event	Location	Method	Round	Time
2024-11-23	Loss	(Japan) Kaisei Kondo	Krush 168	Nagoya, Japan	Decision (Unanimous)	3	3:00
2024-08-18	Loss	(Japan) Takuma Tsukamoto	Krush 164	Tokyo, Japan	Decision (Unanimous)	3	3:00
2023-11-05	Loss	(Thailand) Dansiam Weerasakreck	KNOCK OUT 2023 vol.5	Tokyo, Japan	Decision (Unanimous)	3	3:00
2023-07-17	Draw	(South Korea) Sijun Jin	K-1 World GP 2023	Tokyo, Japan	Decision (Split)	3	3:00
2023-03-05	Win	(Japan) Bazooka Koki	KNOCK OUT 2023 SUPER BOUT BLAZE	Tokyo, Japan	TKO (Three knockdowns)	3	2:11
2022-12-03	Loss	(Japan) Kenta Hayashi	K-1 World GP 2022 in Osaka	Osaka, Japan	Decision (Unanimous)	3	3:00
2022-09-11	Win	(Japan) Yujiro Ono	K-1 World GP 2022 Yokohamatsuri	Yokohama, Japan	TKO (Referee stoppage)	3	2:47
2022-04-03	Win	(Japan) Ruku Kojima	K-1: K'Festa 5	Tokyo, Japan	TKO (Corner stoppage)	3	2:15
2021-12-04	Loss	(Japan) Kenta Hayashi	K-1 World GP 2021 in Osaka	Osaka, Japan	Decision (Unanimous)	3	3:00
2021-07-17	Win	(Japan) Yosuke Tamura	K-1 World GP 2021 in Fukuoka	Fukuoka, Japan	TKO (3 knockdowns)	1	1:53
2021-03-21	Loss	(Japan) Hideaki Yamazaki	K-1: K'Festa 4 Day 1	Tokyo, Japan	KO (Left Jab)	1	1:10
2020-12-13	Win	(Japan) Hayato Suzuki	K-1 World GP 2020 Winter's Crucial Bout	Tokyo, Japan	KO (Right Cross)	2	3:09
2020-09-22	Loss	(Japan) Jin Hirayama	K-1 World GP 2020 in Osaka	Osaka, Japan	Decision (Unanimous)	3	3:00
2020-03-22	Loss	(Japan) Rukiya Anpo	K-1: K’Festa 3	Saitama, Japan	Decision (Unanimous)	3	3:00
For the K-1 World GP Super Lightweight Championship.
2019-12-28	Win	(Japan) Tetsuya Yamato	K-1 World GP 2019 Japan: ～Women's Flyweight Championship Tournament～	Nagoya, Japan	TKO (Punches)	3	0:34
2019-10-13	Win	(Japan) Tsubasa Horii	Krush.106	Tokyo, Japan	KO (Punches)	3	2:59
2019-06-30	Loss	(Japan) Daizo Sasaki	K-1 World GP 2019: Super Bantamweight World Tournament	Saitama, Japan	TKO (Doctor Stoppage)	3	2:14
2019-04-27	Loss	(Japan) Renta Nishioka	SHOOT BOXING 2019 act.2	Tokyo, Japan	Decision (Unanimous)	3	3:00
2019-02-11	Loss	(Australia) Chadd Collins	KNOCK OUT 2019 WINTER THE ANSWER IS IN THE RING	Tokyo, Japan	Decision (Unanimous)	5	3:00
2018-12-09	Win	(Japan) Yuma Yamaguchi	KING OF KNOCK OUT 2018	Tokyo, Japan	Decision (Majority)	5	3:00
2018-08-19	Win	(Japan) Hideki	KNOCK OUT SUMMER FES.2018, Super Lightweight Tournament Final	Tokyo, Japan	Decision (Majority)	5	3:00
Wins the KNOCK OUT Super Lightweight Championship.
2018-06-08	Win	(Japan) Hiroaki Suzuki	KNOCK OUT 2018 Survival Days, Super Lightweight Tournament Semi Final	Tokyo, Japan	Decision (Unanimous)	5	3:00
2018-04-01	Loss	(Japan) Kaito	SHOOT BOXING 2018 act.2	Tokyo, Japan	TKO (Doctor Stoppage/Elbow)	4	2:45
2018-02-12	Win	(Japan) Kenta	KNOCK OUT FIRST IMPACT, Super Lightweight Tournament Quarter Final	Tokyo, Japan	Decision (Majority)	5	3:00
2017-12-10	Win	(Japan) Masanori Kanehara	KING OF KNOCK OUT 2017	Tokyo, Japan	Decision (Unanimous)	5	3:00
2017-09-15	Win	(Japan) Shohei Asahara	RISE 119	Tokyo, Japan	Decision (Unanimous)	5	3:00
Defends the RISE Lightweight Championship.
2017-08-20	Win	(Japan) Shunsuke Motegi	KNOCK OUT vol.4	Tokyo, Japan	TKO (Corner Stoppage)	4	0:53
2017-06-17	Loss	(Japan) Katsuji	KNOCK OUT vol.3, Lightweight Tournament Quarter Final	Tokyo, Japan	TKO (Doctor Stoppage)	5	0:15
2017-04-01	Win	(Japan) Yosuke Mizuochi	KNOCK OUT vol.2	Tokyo, Japan	TKO (Doctor Stoppage)	4	1:01
2017-02-12	Win	(Japan) Hiroto Yamaguchi	KNOCK OUT vol.1	Tokyo, Japan	KO (High kick)	3	1:50
2016-11-30	Win	(Japan) Hachimaki	REBELS.47	Tokyo, Japan	KO (Right Hook)	5	2:02
Wins the REBELS Red Super Lightweight Championship.
2016-07-30	Win	(Japan) Hiroshi Mizumachi	RISE 112	Tokyo, Japan	Decision (Unanimous)	5	3:00
Wins the RISE Lightweight Championship.
2016-06-05	Win	(Belgium) Balis Karabas	SHOOT BOXING 2016 act.3	Tokyo, Japan	KO (Right High Kick)	3	0:25
2016-03-09	Draw	(Netherlands) Pietro Doorje	REBELS.41	Tokyo, Japan	Decision (Unanimous)	3	3:00
2016-01-24	Win	(Japan) Nobu Bravely	KODO 1	Oita, Japan	TKO (Referee Stoppage)	5	1:01
Defends the WPMF Japan Super Lightweight Championship.
2015-11-08	Win	(Japan) Shohei Asahara	RISE 108	Tokyo, Japan	Decision (Majority)	3	3:00
2015-09-16	Win	(Japan) Tsuyoshi Kato	REBELS.38	Tokyo, Japan	KO (Right straight)	3	2:59
Wins the WPMF Japan Super Lightweight Championship.
2015-07-24	Win	(Japan) TASUKU	RISE 106	Tokyo, Japan	KO (Straight Right)	3	2:01
2015-06-07	Win	(Japan) Koji	Bigbang・Touitsu he no michi sono 21	Tokyo, Japan	Decision (Majority)	3	3:00
Defends the BigBang Lightweight Championship.
2015-03-04	Win	(Japan) Takuma Sato	REBELS.34×WPMF JAPAN	Tokyo, Japan	KO	1	2:05
2014-12-29	Loss	(Japan) SHIGERU	BLADE 1 –61 kg Tournament, Semi Final	Tokyo, Japan	Decision	3	3:00
2014-12-29	Win	(Japan) Sho Ogawa	BLADE 1 –61 kg Tournament, Quarter Final	Tokyo, Japan	Decision	3	3:00
2014-10-26	Win	(Japan) Kazuki Koyano	REBELS.31	Tokyo, Japan	Decision	3	3:00
2014-09-07	Win	(Japan) Tatsuya Inaishi	Bigbang 18	Tokyo, Japan	Decision (Majority)	3	3:00
Wins the BigBang Lightweight Championship.
2014-03-23	Loss	(Japan) Yuma Yamaguchi	HOOST CUP LEGEND -Densetsu Kourin-	Aichi, Japan	TKO	2	2:59
2013-10-20	Loss	(Japan) Hikaru Machida	REBELS.21	Tokyo, Japan	Decision	5	3:00
For the REBELS Black Super Featherweight Championship.
2013-07-21	Win	(Japan) Tatsuya Inaishi	REBELS.18, 60 kg Tournament Semi Final	Tokyo, Japan	Decision	3	3:00
2013-06-16	Win	(Japan) Yuto Tsujide	HOOST CUP KINGS～Feast of Champions～	Aichi, Japan	Decision	3	3:00
2013-04-14	Draw	(Japan) Hikaru Machida	REBELS.15	Tokyo, Japan	Decision	3	3:00
2013-02-24	Loss	(Thailand) Pinsiam Maki	HOOST CUP Spirit 2	Aichi, Japan	Decision (Unanimous)	3	3:00
2013-01-27	Win	(Japan) Yuta Tokuyama	REBELS.14	Tokyo, Japan	KO	1	0:28
2012-10-28	Loss	(Japan) Ryoma Hasumi	REBELS.13	Tokyo, Japan	Decision (Majority)	3	3:00
2012-06-17	Win	(Japan) Ryoji Washio	J-NETWORK J-KICK 2012～NEXT J-GENERATION～3rd	Tokyo, Japan	KO	2	1:04
2012-03-25	Loss	(Japan) Yuji Umehara	M-1 Muay Thai Challenge Sutt Yod Muaythai vol.1	Tokyo, Japan	Decision	5	3:00
2011-10-23	Win	(Japan) Masayuki Ishibashi	NAGOYA KICK	Nagoya, Japan	TKO	3	
2011-08-28	Win	(Korea) Sin Son-Ho	NAGOYA KICK	Nagoya, Japan	KO	2	
2011-06-12	Win	(Japan) Koki Onishi	M-1 FAIRTEX Muay Thai Challenge Ganbaro Nippon! RAORAK MUAY vol,2	Tokyo, Japan	Decision	3	3:00
2011-04-24	Win	(Japan) Keizo	NAGOYA KICK ～Scream Like A Rolling Stone～	Nagoya, Japan	Decision	3	3:00
2011-02-27	Win	(Japan) Kentaro Nagai	RISE 74	Tokyo, Japan	KO	1	3:00
2010-12-05	Win	(Japan) Yuji Umehara	NAGOYA KICK	Nagoya, Japan	TKO	3	
2010-09-05	Win	(Japan) Hideki Kuze	NAGOYA KICK～BE-BOP！！	Nagoya, Japan	Decision	3	3:00
2010-07-25	Win	(Japan) Genki	NAGOYA KICK～The morning comes again～	Nagoya, Japan	Decision	3	3:00
2010-05-23	Win	(Japan) Shunta	NAGOYA KICK ～Shine a Light～	Nagoya, Japan	Decision	3	3:00
2009-12-23	Loss	(Japan) Daichi Yamato	NAGOYAKICK ～Shine a Light～	Nagoya, Japan	Decision	3	3:00
2009-10-11	Win	(Japan) Takashi Murakami	NAGOYA KICK～BoogieFight09 VACANCY～	Nagoya, Japan	Decision	3	3:00
2009-08-30	Loss	(Japan) Yukinobu Nakatsuka	KAKUMEI NAGOYA 3 ～ Todoke! Ai to Yuuki to Low kick ～	Nagoya, Japan	KO	1	2:19
2009-05-17	Win	(Japan) Yuta Konami	J-NETWORK J-FIGHT 26	Tokyo, Japan	Decision	3	3:00
2008-08-29	Win	(Japan) Kazuo Mito	K-1 Koshien KING OF UNDER 18～FINAL 16～	Tokyo, Japan	KO	2	1:40
Legend: Win Loss Draw/No contest Notes

== See also ==
- List of male kickboxers
