= Denis Wosik =

German-Polish kickboxer (born 1996)

- Born: November 23, 1996 (age 29); Duisburg, Germany
- Height: 1.71 m (5 ft 7 1/2 in)
- Weight: 65 kg (143 lb; 10.2 st)
- Division: Super Lightweight; Welterweight; Super Welterweight
- Style: Kickboxing
- Stance: Orthodox
- Fighting out of: Oberhausen, Germany
- Team: Amrani Palace
- Trainer: Kamal El Amrani
- Years active: 2014 - present

Kickboxing record
- Total: 53
- Wins: 41
- By knockout: 9
- Losses: 11
- By knockout: 0
- Draws: 1

Denis Wosik (born 23 November 1996) is a German-Polish kickboxer, who currently competes in Glory. He is a former Wu Lin Feng -63 kg World Champion.

As of November 2021 Combat Press ranked him as the #6 super bantamweight kickboxer in the world.

== Kickboxing career ==
=== Wu Lin Feng ===
Wosik made his professional debut in May 2014, against Omid Rezaid at Storm Fighting Championship. He won his debut by decision. After losing his next fight to Kevin Burmester, he went on a three fight winning streak, which earned him the chance to fight Johann Dederer for the Wu Lin Feng German -66 kg title. The fight went into an extra round, after which Dederer won a decision.

In March 2016, Wosik fought and beat Mohamed Lazrak for the International WFMC K-1 rules title.

Wosik lost his next fight against Marcin Kret at HFO 2: Kunlun Eliminations by unanimous decision.

Dennis Wosik entered the 2019 Wu Lin Feng 63 kg World tournament. He defeated Zhu Shuai by decision in the quarterfinals, Jin Ying by decision in the semifinals, and won the tournament with a decision win against Fang Feida in the finals. He defended his title for the first time in January 2020, when he won the rematch with Fang Feida by decision.

=== Glory ===
Wosik made his Glory promotional debut against the RISE lightweight champion Naoki Seki at Glory 81: Ben Saddik vs. Adegbuyi 2 on August 20, 2022. He won the fight by unanimous decision, with all five judges scoring the bout 30–26 in his favor.

Wosik was expected to face Hicham Chaaboute at Glory 82 on November 19, 2022. Chaaboute later withdrew for undisclosed reasons and was replaced by Mohamed El Mesbahi. He won the fight by unanimous decision.

Wosik faced promotional newcomer Marcos Rios at Glory Rivals 5 on January 28, 2023. He lost the fight by split decision.

Wosik faced Berjan Peposhi at Glory 88 on September 9, 2023. He won the fight by split decision.

Wosik faced Jan Kaffa at Glory 92 on May 18, 2024. He won the fight by unanimous decision.

== Titles and achievements ==
- World Sport Fight Martial Arts Council
  - 2016 WFMC International -72.5 kg Champion
- Wu Lin Feng
  - 2019 Wu Lin Feng -63 kg Championship Tournament Winner
  - Wu Lin Feng World -63 kg Championship
    - One successful title defense

== Kickboxing record ==
Professional Kickboxing Record
41 Wins (9 (T)KO's), 11 Losses, 1 Draw
Date	Result	Opponent	Event	Location	Method	Round	Time
2025-12-13	Loss	(Thailand) Petpanomrung Kiatmuu9	Glory Collision 8 - Last Featherweight Standing Second Round	Arnhem, Netherlands	Decision (Unanimous)	3	3:00
2025-08-02	Win	(Thailand) Suarek Teppen Gym	Glory 102 - RISE x Glory Last Featherweight Standing Opening Round	Tokyo, Japan	Decision (Unanimous)	3	3:00
2025-02-22	Win	(France) Matthan Choinard	Glory 98	Rotterdam, Netherlands	Decision (Unanimous)	3	3:00
2024-10-12	Loss	(France) Bobo Sacko	Glory 96	Rotterdam, Netherlands	Ext.R Decision (Split)	4	3:00
2024-05-18	Win	(Netherlands) Jan Kaffa	Glory 92	Rotterdam, Netherlands	Decision (Unanimous)	3	3:00
2023-09-09	Win	(Albania) Berjan Peposhi	Glory 88	Paris, France	Decision (Split)	3	3:00
2023-01-28	Loss	(Argentina) Marcos Rios	Glory Rivals 5	Tulum, Mexico	Decision (Split)	3	3:00
2022-11-19	Win	(Morocco) Mohamed El Mesbahi	Glory 82	Bonn, Germany	Decision (Unanimous)	3	3:00
2022-08-20	Win	(Japan) Naoki	Glory 81: Ben Saddik vs. Adegbuyi 2	Düsseldorf, Germany	Decision (Unanimous)	3	3:00
2020-01-11	Win	(China) Fang Feida	Wu Lin Feng World Cup 2019-2020 Final	Zhuhai, China	Decision (Unanimous)	5	3:00
Defends the Wu Lin Feng World -63kg title.
2019-09-28	Win	(China) Jiao Daobo	Wu Lin Feng World Cup 2019-2020 4th Group Stage	Zhengzhou, China	Decision	3	3:00
2019-04-27	Win	(China) Fang Feida	Wu Lin Feng 2019 - 63kg Championship World Tournament, Final	Zhuhai, China	Decision	3	3:00
Wins Wu Lin Feng World Tournament and the inaugural Wu Lin Feng World -63kg title.
2019-04-27	Win	(China) Jin Ying	Wu Lin Feng 2019 - 63kg Championship World Tournament, Semi Finals	Zhuhai, China	Decision	3	3:00
2019-04-27	Win	(China) Zhu Shuai	Wu Lin Feng 2019 - 63kg Championship World Tournament, Quarterfinals	Zhuhai, China	Decision	3	3:00
2019-01-02	Loss	(Portugal) Diego Freitas	Wu Lin Feng 2019 - 65kg World Championship Tournament Semi Finals	Hengqin, China	Decision	3	3:00
2019-01-02	Win	(China) Meng Guodong	Wu Lin Feng 2019 - 65kg World Championship Tournament Quarterfinals	Hengqin, China	Ext.R Decision	4	3:00
2018-10-13	Loss	(France) Eddy Nait Slimani	World GBC Tour 13	Mazan, France	Decision (Unanimous)	3	3:00
2018-09-29	Win	(China) Wang Wenfeng	David Zunwu World Fighting Championship	Macau	Decision (Unanimous)	3	3:00
2018-06-02	Win	(China) Wang Zhiwei	Wu Lin Feng 2018: Yi Long VS Saiyok	Chongqing, China	Decision	3	3:00
2018-03-21	Loss	(Japan) Masanobu Goshu	K'FESTA.1 - 60 kg World Tournament, Quarterfinals	Saitama, Japan	Decision (Majority)	3	3:00
2018-03-03	Win	(China) Jin Ying	Wu Lin Feng 2018: World Championship Tianjin	Tianjin, China	Decision	3	3:00
2017-11-04	Win	(China) Zhao Chuanlin	Wu Lin Feng 2017: Yi Long VS Sitthichai	Kunming, China	Decision (Unanimous)	3	3:00
2017-09-16	Loss	(Morocco) Khalid El Moukadam	Enfusion Talents #36	Zwolle, Netherlands	Decision	3	3:00
2017-07-15	Win	(Russia) Said Magomedov	ACB KB 10: Russia vs. China	Moscow, Russia	KO (Body Kick)	3	1:19
2017-06-03	Win	(Germany) Haris Biber	Platinum Cup	Wuppertal, Germany	Decision (Unanimous)	3	3:00
2017-04-23	Win	(Germany) Kojo Ennin	Fight Vision Europe 1	Herne, Germany	KO	1	1:45
2017-04-01	Win	(China) Li Yankun	Wu Lin Feng 2017: China VS Europe	Zhengzhou, China	Decision (Unanimous)	3	3:00
2016-	Win	(China) Hao Shengbin	Wu Lin Feng	Zhengzhou, China	Decision (Unanimous)	3	3:00
2016-10-01	Draw	(Moldova) Cristian Dorel	KOK World Series in Chicinau Vol. 18	Chișinău, Moldova	Ext.R Decision	4	3:00
2016-06-17	Loss	(China) Xie Lei	Wu Lin Feng: China vs Germany	Zhengzhou, China	Decision (Split)	3	3:00
2016-05-01	Loss	(Poland) Marcin Kret	HFO 2: Kunlun Eliminations	Poland	Decision (Unanimous)	3	3:00
2016-03-12	Win	(Morocco) Mohamed Lazrak	Erste Wiesbadener Fight Night	Wiesbaden, Germany	Decision	5	3:00
Wins International WFMC K-1 rules title.
2015-04-18	Loss	(Germany) Johann Dederer	Day of Destruction 10	Hamburg, Germany	Ext.R Decision	4	3:00
For the Wu Lin Feng German -66kg title.
2015-03-21	Win	(Germany) Rafik Habiat	Night of the Champions 3	Flörsheim am Main, Germany	Decision (Split)	3	3:00
2014-12-20	Win	(Moldova) Stanislav Renita	KOK Eagle Series 2014 in Chișinău	Chișinău, Moldova	KO (Low Kick)	1	1:30
2014-10-25	Win	(Netherlands) Rhydel Vogelenzang	Storm FC V	Germany	Decision	3	3:00
2014-09-16	Loss	(Germany) Kevin Burmester	Enfusion Talents #03	Merseburg, Germany	Decision	3	3:00
2014-05-31	Win	(Germany) Omid Rezaid	Storm Fighting Championship	Germany	Decision	3	3:00
Legend: Win Loss Draw/No contest Notes

== See also ==
- List of male kickboxers
