= Masanobu Goshu =

Japanese kickboxer

- Born: 郷州 征宜; April 10, 1986 (age 40); Hadano, Kanagawa, Japan
- Other names: Riki Goshu (郷州 力)
- Nationality: Japanese
- Height: 172 cm (5 ft 8 in)
- Weight: 60 kg (130 lb; 9.4 st)
- Style: Kickboxing
- Stance: Orthodox
- Fighting out of: Tokyo, Japan
- Team: K-1 Gym So-Honbu Team Pegasus (2016-2022) PHOENIX (2009-2016)

Kickboxing record
- Total: 36
- Wins: 25
- By knockout: 7
- Losses: 11
- By knockout: 2

Masanobu Goshu is a retired Japanese kickboxer. He is a former Krush Super Featherweight champion.

== Biography and career ==
=== Early life ===
Goshu was born with hearing loss. He started to play baseball in elementary school and dreamed of becoming a professional, he played for the Tokai University Fuzoku Kofu Senior High School team and participated to the 2004 summer Koshien tournament. He started kickboxing after high school. At 21 he moved to Tokyo and joined PHOENIX GYM with the ambition of becoming professional. He won the 2011 All Japan KAMINARIMON -65 kg title as a part of the RISE organization amateur program.

=== RISE career ===
Goshu turned professional under the ring name "Riki Goshu" at RISE 85 on November 23, 2011, where he defeated Shuto Miyazaki by unanimous decision.

On March 11, 2012, Goshu appeared in the first round of the 2012 RISE Rising Rookies Cup at RISE ZERO. He defeated Takeo by unanimous decision to qualify for the Cup final. The final of the Rookies Cup happened on October 25, 2012, at RISE 90 where he defeated Kaido by unanimous decision.

On June 9, 2013, Goshu faced KING at RISE 93. He won the fight by majority decision.

On September 13, 2013, Goshu faced TASUKU at RISE 95. He won the fight by majority decision.

On November 4, 2013, Goshu faced Yuma Yamaguchi at RISE 96. He won the fight by knockout in the second round after flooring his opponent three times.

Goshu challenged Kosuke Komiyama for his RISE Super Featherweight title at RISE 97. He lost the fight by majority decision.

On July 14, 2014, Goshu faced Tatsuya Inaishi at RISE 100 -BLADE 0-. He won the fight by majority decision.

On December 29, 2014, Goshu faced SHIGERU in the first round of the BLADE FC Japan -61 kg Tournament at BLADE 1. He lost the fight by knockout in the third round.

On March 21, 2015, Goshu defeated Sho Ogawa by unanimous decision at RISE 104.

On July 12, 2015, Goshu challenged Hikaru Machida for his REBELS -60 kg title. He lost by unanimous decision after five rounds.

Goshu faced Kodai Nobe on October 12, 2015, at RISE 107 in a fight serving as the semi-final for the vacant super feather weight championship tournament. He lost the fight by majority decision.

=== K-1 and Krush career ===
In early 2016 Goshu changed gym and joined the K-1 organization. He made his promotional debut on April 24, 2016, at K-1 World GP 2016 -60kg Japan Tournament in a tournament reserve fight where he faced Shota Kanbe. He lost the fight by extension round split decision.

On December 18, 2016, Goshu engaged in a tournament for the vacant Krush Super Featherweight championship. In the first round He defeated Yoshiki Harada at Krush 71 by knockout. In the quarter-final happening on Krush 73 he defeated Takeshi Watanabe by unanimous decision.

He faced Riku Anpo in the semi-final of the tournament at Krush 75 on April 2, 2017. He lost the fight by unanimous decision.

On May 28, 2017, Goshu faced Toshi in the semi-final of a tournament for the super featherweight championship challenger position at Krush 76. He won the fight by knockout in the third round.

On August 6, 2017, he defeated Fumiya Osawa by unanimous decision at Krush 78 and became the official Super Featherweight championship challenger.

On October 1, 2017, he rematched Riku Anpo for his Krush Super Featherweight title. He won the fight by split decision.

On March 21, 2018, Goshu engaged in the 2018 K-1 Worldg GP -60 kg World Tournament at K-1 World GP 2018: K'FESTA.1. In the quarter-finals he faced Denis Wosik who he defeated by majority decision. Advancing to the semifinals, he faced Takeru. He lost the fight by knockout, two and half minutes into the first round, after receiving a right straight off of a step-up knee feint. Goshu was unable to beat the eight-count.

Goshu made his first defense of the Krush Super Featherweight title at Krush 89 against Kotaro Shimano. He lost the fight by unanimous decision.

On September 24, 2018, Goshu faced Suarek Rukkukamui at K-1 World GP 2018: inaugural Cruiserweight Championship Tournament. He lost the fight by unanimous decision.

Goshu rebounded from his three fights losing streak when he defeated Naoki Yamamoto by extension round unanimous decision at Krush 96 on December 16, 2018.

On March 10, 2019, Goshu faced Kosuke Komiyama at K-1 World GP 2019: K'FESTA 2. He lost the fight by unanimous decision.

On May 18, 2019, Goshu was faced Yutaka at Krush 101, he was defeated by unanimous decision. Following this loss Goshu distanced himself from kickboxing and later chose to retire due to the COVID-19 pandemic induced break and the birth of his first child.

On July 7, 2022, the K-1 producer announced that Goshu's retirement ceremony would be held at Krush 140 on August 27, 2022.

== Titles and accomplishments ==
=== Professional ===
- Krush
  - 2017 Krush Super Featherweight Champion
- RISE
  - 2012 Rising Rookies Cup Super Featherweight Winner

=== Amateur ===
- RISE
  - 2011 KAMINARIMON All Japan -65 kg Champion & Event MVP

Awards

- efight.jp
  - Fighter of the Month (October 2017)

== Kickboxing record ==
Professional Kickboxing Record
25 Wins (7 (T)KO's), 11 Losses, 0 Draw, 0 No Contest
Date	Result	Opponent	Event	Location	Method	Round	Time
2019-05-18	Loss	(Japan) Yutaka	Krush 101	Tokyo, Japan	Decision (Unanimous)	3	3:00
2019-03-10	Loss	(Japan) Kosuke Komiyama	K-1 World GP 2019: K'FESTA 2	Saitama, Japan	Decision (Unanimous)	3	3:00
2018-12-16	Win	(Japan) Naoki Yamamoto	Krush.96	Tokyo, Japan	Ext.R Decision (Unanimous)	4	3:00
2018-09-24	Loss	(Thailand) Suarek Rukkukamui	K-1 World GP 2018: inaugural Cruiserweight Championship Tournament	Saitama, Japan	Decision (Unanimous)	3	3:00
2018-06-30	Loss	(Japan) Kotaro Shimano	Krush.89	Tokyo, Japan	Decision (Unanimous)	3	3:00
Loses the Krush Super Featherweight title.
2018-03-21	Loss	(Japan) Takeru	K-1 World GP 2018: K'FESTA.1 -60 kg World Tournament, Semi-finals	Saitama, Japan	KO (Punches)	1	2:25
2018-03-21	Win	(Germany) Denis Wosik	K-1 World GP 2018: K'FESTA.1 -60 kg World Tournament, Quarter-finals	Saitama, Japan	Decision (Majority)	3	3:00
2017-10-01	Win	(Japan) Riku Anpo	Krush.81	Tokyo, Japan	Decision (Split)	3	3:00
Wins the Krush Super Featherweight title.
2017-08-06	Win	(Japan) Fumiya Osawa	Krush 78	Tokyo, Japan	Decision (Unanimous)	3	3:00
2017-05-28	Win	(Japan) Toshi	Krush 76	Tokyo, Japan	KO (Knee to the body)	3	2:08
2017-04-02	Loss	(Japan) Riku Anpo	Krush.75 - Super Featherweight Championship Tournament Semi-final	Tokyo, Japan	Decision (Unanimous)	3	3:00
2017-02-18	Win	(Japan) Takeshi Watanabe	Krush 73 - Super Featherweight Championship Tournament Quarter-final	Tokyo, Japan	Decision (Unanimous)	3	3:00
2016-12-18	Win	(Japan) Yoshiki Harada	Krush 71	Tokyo, Japan	TKO (3 knockdowns)	3	1:10
2016-04-24	Loss	(Japan) Shota Kanbe	K-1 World GP 2016 -60kg Japan Tournament	Tokyo, Japan	Ext.R Decision (Split)	4	3:00
2016-01-31	Win	(Japan) Kazuma	RISE 109	Tokyo, Japan	Decision (Unanimous)	3	3:00
2015-10-12	Loss	(Japan) Kodai Nobe	RISE 107 - Super Featherweight Championship Tournament Semi-final	Tokyo, Japan	Decision (Majority)	3	3:00
2015-07-12	Loss	(Japan) Hikaru Machida	REBELS 37	Tokyo, Japan	Decision (Unanimous)	5	3:00
For the REBELS -60kg title.
2015-05-31	Win	(Japan) Fumihiro Uesugi	RISE 105	Tokyo, Japan	Ext.R Decision (Split)	4	3:00
2015-03-21	Win	(Japan) Sho Ogawa	RISE 104	Tokyo, Japan	Decision (Unanimous)	3	3:00
2014-12-29	Loss	(Japan) SHIGERU	BLADE 1 - BLADE FC Japan -61 kg Tournament Quarter-finals	Tokyo, Japan	KO (Flying knee)	3	2:59
2014-09-28	Win	(Japan) Yusuke Nogami	RISE 101	Tokyo, Japan	TKO (Corner stoppage)	2	0:21
2014-07-12	Win	(Japan) Tatsuya Inaishi	RISE 100 ～BLADE 0～	Tokyo, Japan	Decision (Majority)	3	3:00
2014-04-29	Win	(Japan) Scorpion	RISE 99	Tokyo, Japan	TKO (Referee stoppage)	2	2:47
2014-01-25	Loss	(Japan) Kosuke Komiyama	RISE 97	Tokyo, Japan	Decision (Majority)	5	3:00
For the RISE Super Featherweight title.
2013-11-04	Win	(Japan) Yuma Yamaguchi	RISE 96	Tokyo, Japan	TKO (3 knockdowns)	2	0:56
2013-09-13	Win	(Japan) TASUKU	RISE 95	Tokyo, Japan	Decision (Majority)	3	3:00
2013-06-09	Win	(Japan) KING	RISE 93	Tokyo, Japan	Decision (Majority)	3	3:00
2013-04-14	Win	(Japan) Fumiya Sasaki	RISE ZERO	Tokyo, Japan	Decision (Unanimous)	3	3:00
2013-02-03	Win	(Japan) Shinichi Ishii	RISE ZERO	Tokyo, Japan	Ext.R Decision (Unanimous)	4	3:00
2012-10-25	Win	(Japan) Kaido	RISE 90 - Rising Rookies Cup Final	Tokyo, Japan	Decision (Unanimous)	3	3:00
Wins 2012 RISE Rookies Cup Super Featherweight title.
2012-06-02	Win	(Japan) Genki	RISE 88	Tokyo, Japan	TKO	2	1:24
2012-03-11	Win	(Japan) Takeo	RISE ZERO - Rising Rookies Cup Semi-final	Tokyo, Japan	Decision (Unanimous)	3	3:00
2012-01-28	Win	(Japan) Akito	RISE 86	Tokyo, Japan	TKO (Referee stoppage)	3	1:24
2011-11-23	Win	(Japan) Shuto Miyazaki	RISE 85	Tokyo, Japan	Decision (Unanimous)	3	3:00
Legend: Win Loss Draw/No contest Notes

Amateur Kickboxing Record
Date	Result	Opponent	Event	Location	Method	Round	Time
2011-09-18	Win	(Japan) Daiki Kaneko	KAMINARIMON All Japan, Final	Tokyo, Japan	Decision (Unanimous)	1	3:00
Wins 2011 KAMINARIMON All Japan -65kg title.
2011-09-18	Win	(Japan)	KAMINARIMON All Japan, Semi-final	Tokyo, Japan	Decision (Unanimous)	1	2:00
2011-04-17	Win	(Japan) Issei Murate	KAMINARIMON	Tokyo, Japan	Decision (Unanimous)	2	1:30
2010-10-31	Win	(Japan) Osamu Nakamoto	KAMINARIMON	Tokyo, Japan	Decision (Unanimous)	2	1:30
2010-05-30	Win	(Japan) Aito Matsumoto	KAMINARIMON	Tokyo, Japan	Decision (Unanimous)	2	1:30
2010-04-25	Win	(Japan) Keisuke Taguchi	KAMINARIMON	Tokyo, Japan	Decision (Unanimous)	2	1:30
Legend: Win Loss Draw/No contest Notes
