= Suarek Rukkukamui =

Muay Thai fighter

- Born: March 16, 1986 (age 40); Ubon Ratchathani, Thailand
- Other names: スアレック・ルークカムイ; Suarek Teppen Gym
- Height: 165 cm (5 ft 5 in)
- Weight: 62.5 kg (138 lb; 9.84 st)
- Stance: Orthodox
- Fighting out of: Tokyo, Japan
- Team: STURGIS Shinjuku Gym; TEPPEN Gym

Kickboxing record
- Total: 159
- Wins: 107
- By knockout: 39
- Losses: 41
- Draws: 11

Suarek Rukkukamui is a Thai kickboxer and Muay Thai fighter.

As of August 2020, he was ranked the #8 flyweight in the world by Combat Press.

== Career ==
On November 24, 2017, Suarek faced Shinji Suzuki at REBELS 53 for the REBELS Super Lightweight title. He won the fight by unanimous decision.

On October 6, 2019, Suarek faced Shunsuke Miyabi for the interim REBELS Lightweight title at REBELS.63×KNOCK OUT. He won the fight by unanimous decision.

On September 22, 2020, Suarek entered a 4-man tournament at KNOCK OUT CHAMPIONSHIP 2 for the inaugural KNOCK OUT Red Super featherweight title. In semifinals he defeated Kazuma Takahashi by extension round knockout. In the final he defeated Yota Shigemori by unanimous decision to capture the belt.

On June 29, 2025, Suarek came out of retirement at RISE 189 to take part in the Gachi!! tournament. In the semifinals he defeated Ke-Suke by unanimous decision. In the final he defeated Sota "Cerberus" Kimura by unanimous decision to take home the 2 million yens cash prize.

== Titles and accomplishments ==
- Muay Lok
  - 2011 Muay Lok Cup -59 kg Muay Marathon Winner
- REBELS
  - 2017 REBELS Super Lightweight Champion
    - One successful title defense
  - 2019 interim REBELS Lightweight Champion
- KNOCK OUT
  - 2020 KNOCK OUT Red Super featherweight Champion
- M-1
  - 2012 M-1 World Lightweight Champion
  - 2021 M-1 World Super Lightweight Champion
- RISE
  - 2025 Gachi!! 65 kg Tournament Winner

== Fight record ==
Fight record
107 Wins (39 (T)KO's), 41 Losses, 11 Draws
Date	Result	Opponent	Event	Location	Method	Round	Time
2026-08-08		(Japan) Yuri Tanaka	ONE Samurai 2	Tokyo, Japan			
2025-08-02	Loss	(Germany) Denis Wosik	RISE World Series 2025 Tokyo - Last Featherweight Standing Opening Round	Tokyo, Japan	Decision (Unanimous)	3	3:00
2025-06-29	Win	(Japan) Sota "Cerberus" Kimura	RISE 189 - Gachi!! Tournament, Final	Beppu, Japan	Decision (Unanimous)	3	3:00
Wins RISE Gachi 65kg Tournament.
2025-06-29	Win	(Japan) Ke-Suke	RISE 189 - Gachi!! Tournament, Semifinals	Beppu, Japan	Decision (Unanimous)	3	3:00
2023-03-05	Win	(Japan) Daiki Watabe	KNOCK OUT 2023 SUPER BOUT BLAZE	Tokyo, Japan	Decision (Unanimous)	3	3:00
2022-11-27	Win	(Japan) Nobu BRAVELY	KODO 9	Beppu, Japan	Decision (Unanimous)	3	3:00
2022-04-17	Loss	(Japan) REITO BRAVELY	KNOCK OUT 2022 vol.3	Tokyo, Japan	Ext.R KO (Left cross)	4	1:58
2021-12-18	Win	(Japan) Nobu BRAVELY	KODO 7	Beppu, Japan	Decision (Unanimous)	5	3:00
Wins M-1 World Super Lightweight title.
2020-09-22	Loss	(Japan) Yota Shigemori	KNOCK OUT 2021 vol.3	Tokyo, Japan	Decision (Unanimous)	5	3:00
Loses KNOCK OUT Red Super featherweight title.
2021-02-07	Loss	(Japan) Hiroki Kasahara	SHOOT BOXING 2021 act.2	Tokyo, Japan	TKO (Corner stoppage)	2	2:18
2020-09-22	Win	(Japan) Yota Shigemori	KNOCK OUT CHAMPIONSHIP.2, 61.5 kg Grand Prix Final	Tokyo, Japan	Decision (Unanimous)	3	3:00
Wins the inaugural KNOCK OUT Red Super featherweight title.
2020-09-22	Win	(Japan) Kazuma Takahashi	KNOCK OUT CHAMPIONSHIP.2, 61.5 kg Grand Prix Semi Finals	Tokyo, Japan	Ext.R KO (Punches)	4	0:45
2020-02-11	Win	(Japan) Ryutaro	KNOCK OUT CHAMPIONSHIP.1	Tokyo, Japan	Decision (Unanimous)	5	3:00
2019-10-06	Win	(Japan) Shunsuke Miyabi	REBELS.63×KNOCK OUT	Tokyo, Japan	Decision (Unanimous)	5	3:00
Wins the interim REBELS Lightweight title.
2019-08-10	Win	(Japan) Shota Saenchai Gym	REBELS.62	Tokyo, Japan	Decision (Unanimous)	3	3:00
2019-04-20	Win	(Japan) Kazuki Fukada	REBELS.60	Tokyo, Japan	KO (Left Hook)	2	0:47
2018-12-05	Loss	(Japan) Keijirou Miyakoshi	REBELS.59	Tokyo, Japan	KO (Left Hook)	5	1:52
2018-09-24	Win	(Japan) Masanobu Goshu	K-1 World GP 2018: inaugural Cruiserweight Championship Tournament	Saitama, Japan	Decision (Unanimous)	3	3:00
2018-06-06	Win	(Japan) Takuya Sugimoto	REBELS.56	Tokyo, Japan	KO (Left Hook)	2	0:31
Defends the REBELS Super Lightweight title.
2018-03-21	Loss	(Japan) Kosuke Komiyama	K-1 World GP 2018: K'FESTA.1 -60 kg World Tournament, Quarter Finals	Saitama, Japan	KO (left high kick)	1	2:56
2017-11-24	Win	(Japan) Shinji Suzuki	REBELS.53	Tokyo, Japan	Decision (Unanimous)	5	3:00
Wins the REBELS Super Lightweight title.
2017-09-06	Loss	(Japan) Genji Umeno	REBELS.52	Tokyo, Japan	Decision	5	3:00
2017-06-11	Win	(Netherlands) Pilao Santana	REBELS.51	Tokyo, Japan	KO (Left Hook)	1	3:00
2017-04-23	Loss	(China) Sun Zhixiang	Kunlun Fight 60	Guizhou, China	Decision	3	3:00
2017-03-11	Draw	(Japan) Pan Ryunson	REBELS.49	Tokyo, Japan	Decision	5	3:00
2016-11-30	Win	(Japan) Taison Maeguchi	REBELS.47	Tokyo, Japan	Decision (Unanimous)	3	3:00
2016-07-10	Win	(Japan) Raiden HIROAKI	REBELS.44	Tokyo, Japan	Decision (Unanimous)	5	3:00
2016-05-05	Win	(Japan) Sho SaenchaiGym	J-KICK 2016～Honor the fighting spirits～2nd	Tokyo, Japan	TKO (Doctor Stoppage/cut)	3	2:08
2012-06-17	Win	(Thailand) Kanongsuk Weerasakreck	Muay Lok 2012 2nd	Tokyo, Japan	Decision (Unanimous)	5	3:00
Wins the M-1 Lightweight title.
2012-03-18	Win	(Thailand) Kanongsuk Weerasakreck	Muay Lok 2012 1st	Tokyo, Japan	Decision (Majority)	5	3:00
2011-09-19	Loss	(Japan) Yasuyuki	Kick Boxing Union	Tokyo, Japan	Decision (Unanimous)	5	3:00
2011-08-07	Loss	(Japan) Shuwa Tanaka	Muay Lok 2011 3rd	Tokyo, Japan	TKO (Elbow)	5	2:28
2011-07-17	Win	(Japan) HIRΦKI	K-U NKB Houi Agare !	Kyoto, Japan	Decision (Majority)	5	3:00
2011-04-02	Draw	(Thailand) Saengmorakot Chuwattana	Muay Lok 2011 2nd	Tokyo, Japan	Decision (Majority)	5	3:00
2011-02-20	Win	(Thailand) Lak Acegym	Muay Lok 2011 1st, Muay Lok -59 kg Cup, Final	Tokyo, Japan	Decision (Unanimous)	3	3:00
2011-02-20	Win	(Thailand) Eshinin B-Family Neo	Muay Lok 2011 1st, Muay Lok -59 kg Cup, Semi Final	Tokyo, Japan	Decision (Split)	3	3:00
Legend: Win Loss Draw/No contest Notes
