= Kosuke Komiyama =

Japanese kickboxer

- Born: 小宮山 工介; December 16, 1986 (age 39); Ueda, Nagano Japan
- Nationality: Japanese
- Height: 171 cm (5 ft 7 in)
- Weight: 60 kg (130 lb; 9.4 st)
- Division: Flyweight
- Style: Karate, Kickboxing
- Stance: Orthodox
- Fighting out of: Japan
- Team: K-1 Gym Hokuto Kaikan
- Years active: 2007 - present

Kickboxing record
- Total: 40
- Wins: 33
- By knockout: 13
- Losses: 7
- By knockout: 2

Kosuke Komiyama (小宮山 工介, Komiyama Kosuke) is a Japanese kickboxer. He is the former RISE Super Featherweight champion and the 2018 K-1 Super Featherweight GP finalist.

He was ranked as a top ten bantamweight kickboxer by Combat Press between April 2018 and July 2021.

== Kickboxing career ==
=== RISE ===
==== RISE Super Featherweight title reign ====
Komiyama made his professional debut in December 2007, against Daisuke Honma. He won the fight by decision. Komiyama would go on to win his next three fights, before fighting Masato Fuse for the RISE Rookies Cup at R.I.S.E 49. He beat Fuse by TKO, managing to knock him down three times in the second round.

Komiyama amassed a 7–2 record over his next nine fights, before challenging Kan Itabashi for the RISE Super Featherweight title at RISE 74. He won the fight by split decision.

His next four fights were non-title bouts. At RISE 80 he fought Hamza Essalih, whom he defeated by majority decision. At RISE 83 he beat Kim Jin Hyeok by unanimous decision, at RISE 85 he beat Sergio Wielzen by a first-round knockout, and at RISE 87 he beat Mu Yuenlong by a first-round TKO.

He was scheduled to defend his title for the first time at RISE 88, when he faced Motochika Hanada. He beat Hanada by TKO, after Hanada's corner threw in the towel in the fourth round. Following his successful title defense, Komiyama extended his winning streak to 12, which culminated in a majority decision over Yuki. The streak was snapped by Itto at RISE 95, who defeated Komiyama by unanimous decision.

Komiyama was scheduled to defend his title for the second time at RISE 97, against Masanobu Goshu, whom he beat by majority decision.

==== BLADE FC tournament ====
AFter back to back losses to Maki Pinsiam and Kaew Fairtex, Komiyama entered the 2014 BLADE FC 61 kg tournament. In the quarterfinals, he fought Yasuyuki, and won the fight by unanimous decision. He won the semifinal bout against Katsuji in same fashion. Komiyama fought SHIGERU in the tournament final, and stopped his opponent by knockout in the second round.

For his last fight with RISE, Komiyama was scheduled to fight Mansour Yaqubi at RISE 109. The fight ended in a draw after three rounds, and so went into an extra round, after which Komiyama won by unanimous decision.

=== K-1 ===
In his promotional debut, Komiyama faced Yun Qi. Qi won the fight by majority decision.

Komiyama participated in the 2016 K-1 Super Featherweight Grand Prix. He defeated Paulo Tebar by unanimous decision in the quarterfinal, but was unable to advance to the semifinals, as he had to be taken to the hospital due to a leg injury he had sustained during the bout. He fought again two months later, defeating Stavros Exakoustidis by unanimous decision.

Komiyama took part in the 2018 K-1 Super Featherweight Grand Prix, being scheduled to fight Suarek Rukkukamui in the quarterfinal. He knocked Suarek out in the first round by a head kick. In the semifinal, he beat Koji by unanimous decision, and faced Takeru Segawa in the finals. Takeru won the fight by TKO, knocking Komiyama down three times in the third round.

In his next two fights, Komiyama defeated Masanobu Goshu by unanimous decision, and suffered a knockout loss to Leona Pettas.

== Titles and accomplishments ==
- K-1
  - 2018 K-1 WORLD GP -60 kg World Tournament runner-up
- RISE
  - 2011 RISE Super Featherweight Champion (Defended twice)
  - 2014 BLADE FC -61 kg Japan Cup Champion

Awards

- eFight.jp
  - Fighter of the Month (December 2014)

== Professional kickboxing record ==
Kickboxing & Muay Thai record
33 Wins (13 (T)KO's), 8 Losses, 0 Draw, 0 No Contest
Date	Result	Opponent	Event	Location	Method	Round	Time
2019-06-30	Loss	(Japan) Leona Pettas	K-1 World GP 2019: Super Bantamweight World Tournament	Saitama, Japan	KO (Left Jab)	2	
2019-03-10	Win	(Japan) Masanobu Goshu	K-1 World GP 2019: K’FESTA 2	Saitama, Japan	Decision (Unanimous)	3	3:00
2018-03-21	Loss	(Japan) Takeru	K-1 World GP 2018: K'FESTA.1 -60 kg World Tournament, Final	Saitama, Japan	TKO (3 Knockdowns/Right Hook)	3	2:01
For the K-1 World GP 2016 -60kg title.
2018-03-21	Win	(Japan) Koji	K-1 World GP 2018: K'FESTA.1 -60 kg World Tournament Semi Finals	Saitama, Japan	Decision (Unanimous)	3	3:00
2018-03-21	Win	(Thailand) Suarek Rukkukamui	K-1 World GP 2018: K'FESTA.1 -60 kg World Tournament, Quarter Finals	Saitama, Japan	KO (left high kick)	1	2:56
2017-11-23	Win	(Greece) Stavros Exakoustidis	K-1 World GP 2017 Heavyweight Championship Tournament	Japan	Decision (Unanimous)	3	3:00
2016-09-19	Win	(Brazil) Paulo Tebar	K-1 World GP 2016 -60kg World Tournament Quarter Finals	Tokyo, Japan	Decision (Unanimous)	3	3:00
Out of the tournament despite winning because of an injury.
2016-06-24	Loss	(China) Yun Qi	K-1 World GP 2016 -65kg World Tournament	Tokyo, Japan	Decision (Majority)	3	3:00
2016-01-31	Win	(Netherlands) Mansour Yaqubi	RISE 109	Tokyo, Japan	Ext.R Decision (Unanimous)	4	3:00
2014-12-29	Win	(Japan) SHIGERU	BLADE FIGHTING CHAMPIONSHIP 1 - JAPAN CUP -61 kg, Final	Tokyo, Japan	TKO (Left Hook)	2	0:17
Wins the BLADE FC -61kg Japan Cup Tournament.
2014-12-29	Win	(Japan) Katsuji	BLADE FIGHTING CHAMPIONSHIP 1 - JAPAN CUP -61 kg, Semi Finals	Tokyo, Japan	Decision (Unanimous)	3	3:00
2014-12-29	Win	(Japan) Yasuyuki	BLADE FIGHTING CHAMPIONSHIP 1 - JAPAN CUP -61 kg, Quarter Finals	Tokyo, Japan	Decision (Unanimous)	3	3:00
2014-07-12	Loss	(Thailand) Kaew Fairtex	RISE 100 -Blade 0-	Tokyo, Japan	Decision (Unanimous)	3	3:00
2014-04-13	Loss	(Thailand) Pinsiam Maki	MAJKF DRAGON.5 ～THE ONE AND ONLY～ Monkoukaihou	Tokyo, Japan	Decision (Majority)	3	3:00
2014-01-25	Win	(Japan) Masanobu Goshu	RISE 97	Tokyo, Japan	Decision (Majority)	5	3:00
Defends the RISE Super Featherweight title.
2013-09-13	Loss	(Japan) Itto	RISE 95	Tokyo, Japan	Decision (Unanimous)	3	3:00
2013-06-09	Win	(Japan) Yuki	RISE 93	Tokyo, Japan	Decision (Majority)	3	3:00
2013-04-20	Win	(Korea) Kim Sung Jae	SHOOT BOXING 2013	Tokyo, Japan	Decision (Unanimous)	3	3:00
2012-11-17	Win	(Japan) Naguranchun Masa M16	SHOOT BOXING World Tournament S-cup 2012	Tokyo, Japan	Ext.R Decision (Majority)	4	3:00
2012-09-17	Win	(Japan) Akifumi Utagawa	SHOOT BOXING 2012 Road to S-cup～act.4	Tokyo, Japan	Decision (Unanimous)	3	3:00
2012-06-02	Win	(Japan) Motochika Hanada	RISE 88	Tokyo, Japan	TKO (Corner Stoppage)	4	2:53
Defends the RISE Super Featherweight title.
2012-03-24	Win	(China) Mu Yuenlong	RISE 87	Tokyo, Japan	TKO (Punches)	1	1:12
2011-11-23	Win	(Suriname) Sergio Wielzen	RISE 85	Tokyo, Japan	KO (Front Kick to the face)	1	2:08
2011-09-23	Win	(Korea) Kim Jin Hyeok	RISE 83	Tokyo, Japan	Decision (Unanimous)	3	3:00
2011-07-23	Win	(Morocco) Hamza Essalih	RISE 80	Tokyo, Japan	Decision (Majority)	3	3:00
2011-02-27	Win	(Japan) Kan Itabashi	RISE 74	Tokyo, Japan	Decision (Split)	5	3:00
Wins the RISE Super Featherweight title.
2010-12-29	Win	(Japan) Yuji "RIOT" Nagado	RISE 73R	Tokyo, Japan	KO (Right High Kick)	1	2:17
2010-10-03	Win	(Thailand) Ponsin Kiatchangsing	RISE 71	Tokyo, Japan	KO (Right High Kick)	2	2:19
2010-05-02	Loss	(Japan) Keiji Ozaki	K-1 WORLD MAX 2010 ～-63 kg Japan Tournament 1st Round～	Tokyo, Japan	Decision (Split)	3	3:00
2010-03-27	Win	(Japan) Takehiro Murahama	K-1 WORLD MAX 2010 ～-70 kg Japan Tournament～	Tokyo, Japan	TKO (Corner Stoppage)	2	1:49
2009-11-22	Win	(Japan) TURBφ	RISE 60	Japan	Decision (Unanimous)	3	3:00
2009-10-04	Win	(Japan) Makoto Kushima	RISE 59	Japan	KO (Right Hook)	3	0:57
2009-05-13	Loss	(Japan) Tomohaki Suehiro	RISE 55	Japan	Ext.R Decision (Unanimous)	4	3:00
2009-03-29	Win	(Brazil) Prazinho	RISE 53	Japan	KO	1	3:00
2008-11-30	Win	(Japan) Hideya Nazakasaki	RISE 51	Japan	Decision	3	3:00
2008-08-30	Win	(Japan) Masato Fuse	R.I.S.E.49 RISING ROOKIES CUP	Japan	KO (3 Knockdowns)	2	2:13
Wins the RISE Rookies Cup.
2008-07-04	Win	(Japan) Makoto Nakamura	RISE 48 THE KING OF GLADIATORs’08	Japan	TKO (Doctor Stoppage)	3	1:11
2008-04-27	Win	(Japan) Taiyou Takahira	RISE 45	Japan	Decision (Extra round)	4	3:00
2008-02-22	Win	(Japan) Akikusa Toshimitsu	RISE	Japan	KO	1	2:40
2007-12-16	Win	(Japan) Daisuke Honma	RISE DEAD OR ALIVE TOURNAMENT’07	Japan	Decision	3	3:00
Legend: Win Loss Draw/No contest Notes

== See also ==
- List of male kickboxers
