= 2018 in K-1 =

Mixed martial arts events

Information
- First date: March 21, 2018

The year 2018 was the 25th year in the history of the K-1, a Japanese kickboxing promotion. The year started with K-1: K’Festa 1.

== List of events ==
#	Event Title	Date	Arena	Location
1	K-1 World GP 2018: K'FESTA.1	March 21, 2018	Saitama Super Arena	Saitama, Japan
2	K-1 World GP 2018: 2nd Featherweight Championship Tournament	June 17, 2018	Saitama Super Arena	Saitama, Japan
3	K-1 World GP 2018: inaugural Cruiserweight Championship Tournament	September 24, 2018	Saitama Super Arena	Saitama, Japan
4	K-1 World GP 2018: 3rd Super Lightweight Championship Tournament	November 3, 2018	Saitama Super Arena	Saitama, Japan
5	K-1 World GP 2018: K-1 Lightweight World's Strongest Tournament	December 8, 2018	Edion Arena	Osaka, Japan

== K-1 World GP 2018: K'FESTA.1 ==
K-1: K’Festa 1
- Promotion: K-1
- Date: March 21, 2018
- Venue: Saitama Super Arena
- City: Saitama, Japan

K-1 World GP 2018: K'FESTA.1 was a kickboxing event held by K-1 on March 21, 2018 at the Saitama Super Arena in Saitama, Japan.

=== Background ===
This event features six world title fights and an 8-Man Super Featherweight Tournament.

Wei Rui, came overweight at the weigh-ins and his title was vacated. By winning Koya Urabe was eligible for the title while Wei Rui was ineligible and in case of him winning the title would have become vacant.

=== Fight Card ===
K’Festa 1
Weight Class				Method	Round	Time	Notes
Super Featherweight 60 kg	(Japan) Takeru	def.	(Japan) Kosuke Komiyama	TKO (3 Knockdown Rule)	3	2:02	Super Featherweight GP Finals
Super Bantamweight 55 kg	(Japan) Yoshiki Takei (c)	def.	(Japan) Kenji Kubo	KO (Right Hook)	1	1:28	For the K-1 Super Bantamweight Championship
Lightweight 62.5 kg	(Japan) Koya Urabe	def.	(China) Wei Rui (c)	KO (Straight Left)	2	1:14	For the K-1 Lightweight Championship
Super Lightweight 65 kg	(Japan) Ren Hiramoto	def.	(Thailand) Kaew Weerasakreck	KO (Punches)	2	2:18	
Welterweight 67.5 kg	(Japan) Yasuhiro Kido	def.	(Morocco) Issam Chahid	Decision (Unanimous)	3	3:00	
Welterweight 67.5 kg	(Brazil) Minoru Kimura	def.	(Japan) Jin Hirayama	KO (Left Hook)	1	2:50	
Super Welterweight 70 kg	(Belarus) Chingiz Allazov (c)	def.	(Japan) Hinata	KO (Left Hook)	2	0:23	For the K-1 Super Welterweight Championship
Super Lightweight 65 kg	(Japan) Masaaki Noiri (c)	def.	(Japan) Tetsuya Yamato	KO (Punches)	3	2:57	For the K-1 Super Lightweight Championship
Super Featherweight 60 kg	(Japan) Takeru	def.	(Japan) Masanobu Goshu	KO (Punches)	1	2:24	Super Featherweight GP Semi-Finals
Super Featherweight 60 kg	(Japan) Kosuke Komiyama	def.	(Japan) Koji	Decision (Unanimous)	3	3:00	Super Featherweight GP Semi-Finals
Super Lightweight 65 kg	(Japan) Jun Nakazawa	vs.	(Japan) Yasuomi Soda	Decision (Majority)	3	3:00	
Super Bantamweight 55 kg	(Japan) Taito Gunji	def.	(Japan) Takumi Tosaka	Decision (Unanimous)	3	3:00	
Women's Catchweight 50.5 kg	(Japan) Kana Morimoto	def.	(Russia) Polina Petukhova	Decision (Unanimous)	3	3:00	
Heavyweight	(Netherlands) Roel Mannaart	def.	(Croatia) Antonio Plazibat (c)	Decision (Unanimous)	3	3:00	For the K-1 Heavyweight Championship
Welterweight 67.5 kg	(Japan) Yuta Kubo (c)	def.	(Armenia) Melsik Baghdasaryan	Decision (Unanimous)	3	3:00	For the K-1 Welterweight Championship
Super Featherweight 60 kg	(Japan) Masanobu Goshu	def.	(Germany) Denis Wosik	Decision (Majority)	3	3:00	Super Featherweight GP Quarter-Finals
Super Featherweight 60 kg	(Japan) Takeru	def.	(Greece) Stavros Exakoustidis	Decision (Unanimous)	3	3:00	Super Featherweight GP Quarter-Finals
Super Featherweight 60 kg	(Japan) Kosuke Komiyama	def.	(Thailand) Suarek Rukkukamui	KO (Left Head Kick)	1	2:56	Super Featherweight GP Quarter-Finals
Super Featherweight 60 kg	(Japan) Koji	def.	(Japan) Hirotaka Urabe	Decision (Extra Round - Unanimous)	4	3:00	Super Featherweight GP Quarter-Finals
Super Featherweight 60 kg	(Japan) Tatsuya Oiwa	def.	(Japan) Takumi Yokoyama	Decision (Majority)	3	3:00	Super Featherweight GP Reserve Fight
Preliminary Card
Super Featherweight 60 kg	(Japan) Hayato	def.	(Japan) Toshi	TKO (3 Knockdown Rule)	1	1:25	
Lightweight 62.5 kg	(Japan) Kaisei Kondo	def.	(Japan) Shota Hara	KO (Punches)	1	1:22	
Welterweight 67.5 kg	(Japan) Ruku	def.	(Japan) Kona Kato	Decision (Majority)	3	3:00	
Lightweight 62.5 kg	(Japan) Junpei Sano	def.	(Japan) Hideaki Matsumura	TKO (3 Knockdown Rule)	3	2:07	

=== K-1 World GP 2018 -60kg Japan Tournament bracket ===
Quarter-Finals
(Japan) Masanobu Goshyu	UD
(Germany) Dennis Wosik
(Japan) Takeru	UD
(Greece) Stavros Exakoustidis
(Japan) Kosuke Komiyama	KO
(Thailand) Suarek Rukkukamui
(Japan) Hirotaka Urabe
(Japan) Koji	UD

Semi-Finals
(Japan) Masanobu Goshyu
(Japan) Takeru	KO
(Japan) Kosuke Komiyama	UD
(Japan) Koji

Final
(Japan) Takeru	KO
(Japan) Kosuke Komiyama

== K-1 World GP 2018: 2nd Featherweight Championship Tournament ==
K-1 World GP 2018 -57.5kg
- Promotion: K-1
- Date: June 17, 2018
- Venue: Saitama Super Arena
- City: Saitama, Japan

K-1 World GP 2018: 2nd Featherweight Championship Tournament will be a kickboxing event held by K-1 on June 17, 2018 at the Saitama Super Arena in Saitama, Japan.

=== Background ===
This event will feature an 8-Man Featherweight Tournament.

=== Fight Card ===
K-1 World GP 2018 Featherweight World Tournament
Weight Class				Method	Round	Time	Notes
Featherweight 57.5 kg	(Japan) Yuta Murakoshi	def.	(Japan) Haruma Saikyo	TKO (Ankle Injury)	1	0:50	Featherweight GP Final
Lightweight 62.5 kg	(Japan) Koya Urabe	def.	(United States) Arthur Sorsor	KO (Knee and Punch)	2	0:46	
Super Lightweight 65 kg	(Japan) Masaaki Noiri	def.	(Germany) Vincent Foschiani	KO (Punch to the Body)	2	2:45	
Welterweight 67.5 kg	(Brazil) Minoru Kimura	def.	(Japan) Kazuki Yamagiwa	KO (Punch)	1	2:48	
Super Lightweight 65 kg	(Japan) Hideaki Yamazaki	def.	(Japan) Jun Nakazawa	Decision (Unanimous)	3	3:00	
Featherweight 57.5 kg	(Japan) Yuta Murakoshi	def.	(Spain) Jorge Varela	Ext.Round Decision (Unanimous)	4	3:00	Featherweight GP Semi-Finals
Featherweight 57.5 kg	(Japan) Haruma Saikyo	def.	(Japan) Ryusei Ashizawa	Decision (Unanimous)	3	3:00	Featherweight GP Semi-Finals
Lightweight 62.5 kg	(Thailand) Gonnapar Weerasakreck	def.	(Japan) Rukiya Anpo	TKO (3 Knockdown Rules)	2	1:47	
Welterweight 67.5 kg	(Japan) Yasuhiro Kido	def.	(Netherlands) Massaro Glunder	DQ (Holding)	3	2:30	
Cruiserweight 90 kg	(Japan) Hisaki Kato	def.	(Japan) Makoto Uehara	Ext.Round Decision (Split)	4	3:00	
Featherweight 57.5 kg	(Japan) Haruma Saikyo	def.	(Japan) Hirotaka Asahisa	Decision (Split)	3	3:00	Featherweight GP Quarter-Finals
Featherweight 57.5 kg	(Japan) Ryusei Ashizawa	def.	(Romania) Silviu Vitez	KO (Punch)	1	1:28	Featherweight GP Quarter-Finals
Featherweight 57.5 kg	(Japan) Yuta Murakoshi	def.	(France) Elias Mahmoudi	Ext.Round Decision (Split)	4	3:00	Featherweight GP Quarter-Finals
Featherweight 57.5 kg	(Spain) Jorge Varela	def.	(Japan) Kaito Ozawa	TKO (2 Knockdown Rules)	1	2:56	Featherweight GP Quarter-Finals
Featherweight 57.5 kg	(Japan) Yuki Egawa	def.	(Japan) Yuta Otaki	TKO (Punches)	1	1:26	Featherweight GP Reserve Fight
Preliminary Card
Featherweight 57.5 kg	(Japan) Namito Izawa	def.	(Japan) Kento Ito	Decision (Unanimous)	3	3:00	
Super Lightweight 65 kg	(Japan) Kaisei Kondo	Draw	(Japan) Hayato Suzuki	Decision	3	3:00	
Welterweight 67.5 kg	(Japan) Kaito	def.	(Japan) Toshiki Watanabe	KO	1	1:03	
Super Featherweight 60 kg	(Japan) Tomoya Yokoyama	def.	(Japan) Kazuma Kubo	KO	1	1:03	

=== K-1 World GP 2018 2nd Featherweight Championship Tournament bracket ===
Quarter-Finals
(Japan) Haruma Saikyo	S.Dec
(Japan) Hirotaka Asahisa	3r.
(Japan) Ryusei Ashizawa	KO
(Romania) Silviu Vitez	1r.
(Japan) Yuta Murakoshi	S.Dec
(France) Elias Mahmoudi	4r.
(Spain) Jorge Varela	TKO
(Japan) Kaito Ozawa	1r.

Semi-Finals
(Japan) Haruma Saikyo	U.Dec
(Japan) Ryusei Ashizawa	3r.
(Japan) Yuta Murakoshi	U.Dec
(Spain) Jorge Varela	4r.

Final
(Japan) Haruma Saikyo	1r.
(Japan) Yuta Murakoshi	TKO

== K-1 World GP 2018: inaugural Cruiserweight Championship Tournament ==
K-1 World GP 2018: inaugural Cruiserweight Championship Tournament
- Promotion: K-1
- Date: September 24, 2018
- Venue: Saitama Super Arena
- City: Saitama, Japan

K-1 World GP 2018: inaugural Cruiserweight Championship Tournament will be a kickboxing event held by K-1 on September 24, 2018 at the Saitama Super Arena in Saitama, Japan.

=== Background ===
This event will feature an 8-Man Cruiserweight Tournament.

=== Results ===
K-1 World GP 2018 Cruiserweight World Tournament
Weight Class				Method	Round	Time	Notes
Cruiserweight 90 kg	(Iran) Sina Karimian	def.	(Morocco) Boubaker El Bakouri	Decision (Majority)	3	3:00	Cruiserweight GP Final
Super Featherweight 60 kg	(Japan) Takeru	def.	(Spain) Daniel Puertas Gallardo	KO (Punches)	1	2:08	
Super Bantamweight 55 kg	(Japan) Yoshiki Takei	def.	(France) Akram Hamidi	KO (Punches)	1	1:41	
Super Featherweight 60 kg	(Japan) Koji	def.	(Greece) Stavros Exakoustidis	Ext.Round Decision (Split)	3	3:00	
Cruiserweight 90 kg	(Morocco) Boubaker El Bakouri	def.	(Japan) Hitoshi Sugimoto	TKO (2 Knockdown Rules)	2	1:38	Cruiserweight GP Semi-Finals
Cruiserweight 90 kg	(Iran) Sina Karimian	def.	(Japan) K-Jee	Decision (Unanimous)	3	3:00	Cruiserweight GP Semi-Finals
Featherweight 57.5 kg	(Japan) Ryusei Ashizawa	def.	(Japan) Kaito Ozawa	Decision (Unanimous)	3	3:00	
Lightweight 62.5 kg	(Japan) Rukiya Anpo	def.	(Japan) Kenta Hayashi	KO (Punch)	3	0:43	
Super Featherweight 60 kg	(Thailand) Suarek Rukkukamui	def.	(Japan) Masanobu Goshu	Decision (Unanimous)	3	3:00	
Cruiserweight 90 kg	(Morocco) Boubaker El Bakouri	def.	(Japan) Makoto Uehara	KO (Punch)	1	1:05	Cruiserweight GP Quarter-Finals
Cruiserweight 90 kg	(Japan) Hitoshi Sugimoto	def.	(England) Aundre Groce	Decision (Unanimous)	3	3:00	Cruiserweight GP Quarter-Finals
Cruiserweight 90 kg	(Japan) K-Jee	def.	(United States) Brian McGrath	TKO (Referee Stoppage)	1	2:36	Cruiserweight GP Quarter-Finals
Cruiserweight 90 kg	(Iran) Sina Karimian	def.	(Japan) OD-KEN	KO (Knee and Punches)	4	0:38	Cruiserweight GP Quarter-Finals
Cruiserweight 90 kg	(Japan) RUI	def.	(Japan) Furuta Taichi	KO (Knee to the Body)	3	2:48	Cruiserweight GP Reserve Fight
Preliminary Card
Super Lightweight 65 kg	(Japan) Kaisei Kondo	def.	(Japan) Ryuka Ohba	Decision (Unanimous)	3	2:00	K-1 Koshien 2018 -65kg Final
Lightweight 60 kg	(Japan) Rikiya Yamaura	def.	(Japan) Ryusei Shimizu	Decision (Unanimous)	3	2:00	K-1 Koshien 2018 -60kg Final
Super Bantamweight 55 kg	(Japan) Kazuma Takuda	def.	(Japan) Rui Kasami	KO	3	0:33	K-1 Koshien 2018 -55kg Final
Lightweight 62.5 kg	(Japan) Hisaki Higashimoto	def.	(Japan) Shuji Kawarada	Decision (Majority)	3	3:00	
Super Bantamweight 55 kg	(Japan) Takaya Ogura	def.	(Japan) Ryota	KO	1	0:38	

=== K-1 World GP 2018 Cruiserweight Tournament bracket ===
Quarter-Finals
(Iran) Sina Karimian	KO
(Japan) OD-KEN	4r.
(Japan) K-Jee	TKO
(United States) Brian McGrath	1r.
(Japan) Hitoshi Sugimoto	UD
(England) Aundre Groce	3r.
(Morocco) Boubaker El Bakouri	KO
(Japan) Makoto Uehara	1r.

Semi-Finals
(Iran) Sina Karimian	UD
(Japan) K-Jee	3r.
(Morocco) Boubaker El Bakouri	TKO
(Japan) Hitoshi Sugimoto	2r.

Final
(Iran) Sina Karimian	MD
(Morocco) Boubaker El Bakouri	3r.

== K-1 World GP 2018: 3rd Super Lightweight Championship Tournament ==
K-1 World GP 2018 -65kg
- Promotion: K-1
- Date: November 3, 2018
- Venue: Saitama Super Arena
- City: Saitama, Japan

K-1 World GP 2018: 3rd Super Lightweight Championship Tournament will be a kickboxing event held by K-1 on November 3, 2018 at the Saitama Super Arena in Saitama, Japan.

=== Background ===
This event will feature an 8-Man Super Lightweight Tournament.

=== Fight Card ===
K-1 World GP 2018 Super Lightweight World Tournament
Weight Class				Method	Round	Time	Notes
Super Lightweight 65 kg	(Thailand) Kaew Fairtex	def.	(Japan) Daizo Sasaki	Decision (Unanimous)	3	3:00	Super Lightweight GP Final
Featherweight 57 kg	(Spain) Alex Rivas	def.	(Japan) Yuta Murakoshi	Decision (Unanimous)	3	3:00	
Catchweight 68 kg	(Netherlands) Jordann Pikeur	def.	(Brazil) Minoru Kimura	TKO (4 Knockdowns)	3	1:29	
Featherweight 57 kg	(Japan) Hirotaka Urabe	def.	(Japan) Ryusei Ashizawa	KO (Overhand Right)	3	2:28	
Welterweight 67.5 kg	(Japan) Yasuhiro Kido	def.	(Papua New Guinea) Jonathan Tuhu	Decision (Unanimous)	3	3:00	
Super Lightweight 65 kg	(Thailand) Kaew Fairtex	def.	(Japan) Yasuomi Soda	Ext.R Decision (Unanimous)	4	3:00	Super Lightweight GP Semi Final
Super Lightweight 65 kg	(Japan) Daizo Sasaki	def.	(Japan) Jun Nakazawa	Decision (Unanimous)	3	3:00	Super Lightweight GP Semi Final
Catchweight 50 kg	(Japan) KANA	def.	(Sweden) Josefine Lindgren Knutsson	Decision (Unanimous)	3	3:00	
Cruiserweight 90 kg	(Japan) Hisaki Kato	def.	(Japan) RUI	KO (Overhand Left)	1	1:59	
Featherweight 57 kg	(Japan) Yuki Egawa	def.	(Japan) Hayato	Ext.R Decision (Unanimous)	4	3:00	
Super Lightweight 65 kg	(Thailand) Kaew Fairtex	def.	(Japan) Tetsuya Yamato	KO (High Kick)	1	1:32	Super Lightweight GP Quarter Final
Super Lightweight 65 kg	(Japan) Yasuomi Soda	def.	(South Africa) Mo Abdurahman	TKO (2 Knockdowns)	4	2:31	Super Lightweight GP Quarter Final
Super Lightweight 65 kg	(Japan) Jun Nakazawa	def.	(Republic of Ireland) Sean Clancy	TKO (Punches)	1	1:09	Super Lightweight GP Quarter Final
Super Lightweight 65 kg	(Japan) Daizo Sasaki	def.	(New Zealand) Sam Hill	Decision (Unanimous)	3	3:00	Super Lightweight GP Quarter Final
Super Lightweight 65 kg	(Japan) Daiki Matsushita	def.	(Japan) FUMIYA	TKO (2 Knockdowns)	1	2:40	Super Lightweight GP Reserve Fight
Preliminary Card
Super Lightweight 65 kg	(Japan) Shinichiro Yamamoto	def.	(Japan) Takumi Furukawa	Decision (Unanimous)	3	2:00	K-1 College 2018 -65kg Final
Super Featherweight 60 kg	(Japan) Kazuki Sagegami	def.	(Japan) Ryo Shimoji	KO	3	1:25	K-1 College 2018 -60kg Final
Super Bantamweight 55 kg	(Japan) Hinata Matsumoto	def.	(Japan) Gentaro iwamoto	TKO	2	1:29	K-1 College 2018 -55kg Final
Super Featherweight 60 kg	(Japan) Tomoya Yokoyama	def.	(Japan) Yuya	KO	1	0:36	
Super Lightweight 65 kg	(Japan) Jinya	def.	(Japan) Yuki Koge	KO	3	0:43	

=== K-1 World GP 2018 Super Lightweight Tournament bracket ===
Quarter-Finals
(Japan) Daizo Sasaki	UD
(New Zealand) Sam Hill	3r.
(Japan) Jun Nakazawa	KO
(Republic of Ireland) Sean Clancy	1r.
(Japan) Yasuomi Soda	KO
(South Africa) Mo Abdurahman	4r.
(Thailand) Kaew Fairtex	KO
(Japan) Tetsuya Yamato	1r.

Semi-Finals
(Japan) Daizo Sasaki	UD
(Japan) Jun Nakazawa	3r.
(Thailand) Kaew Fairtex	Ext.R UD
(Japan) Yasuomi Soda	4r.

Final
(Thailand) Kaew Fairtex	UD
(Japan) Daizo Sasaki	3r.

== K-1 World GP 2018: K-1 Lightweight World's Strongest Tournament ==
K-1 World GP 2018 -62.5kg
- Promotion: K-1
- Date: December 8, 2018
- Venue: Edion Arena Osaka
- City: Osaka, Japan

K-1 World GP 2018: K-1 Lightweight World's Strongest Tournament was a kickboxing event held by K-1 on December 8, 2018 at the Edion Arena Osaka in Osaka, Japan.

=== Background ===
This event will feature an 8-Man Lightweight Tournament.

=== Results ===
K-1 World GP 2018 Lightweight World Tournament
Weight Class				Method	Round	Time	Notes
Super Featherweight 60 kg	(Japan) Takeru	def.	(Japan) Koji	Decision (Unanimous)	3	3:00	For the K-1 Super Featherweight Championship
Lightweight 62.5 kg	(Japan) Kenta Hayashi	def.	(Japan) Fumiya Osawa	KO (Punches)	3	1:52	Lightweight GP Final
Super Bantamweight 55 kg	(Japan) Yoshiki Takei	def.	(Thailand) Yodbuadeng Fairtex	Ext.R Decision (Unanimous)	4	3:00	
Welterweight 67.5 kg	(Japan) Masaaki Noiri	def.	(Japan) Riki Matsuoka	KO (Punches)	1	1:57	
Welterweight 67.5 kg	(Japan) Rukiya Anpo	def.	(Japan) Hideaki Yamazaki	TKO (High Kick)	4	0:14	
Lightweight 62.5 kg	(Japan) Fumiya Osawa	def.	(Japan) Kyoshiro	KO (Punches)	2	2:00	Lightweight GP Semi-Finals
Lightweight 62.5 kg	(Japan) Kenta Hayashi	def.	(Japan) Yuto Shinohara	KO (Punches)	1	2:31	Lightweight GP Semi-Finals
Featherweight 57.5 kg	(Japan) Taio Asahisa	def.	(Japan) Riku Anpo	Decision (Unanimous)	3	3:00	
Super Bantamweight 55 kg	(Japan) Yuta Hayashi	vs.	(Japan) Shuhei Kumura	No Contest (Accidental Headbutt)	1	1:45	
Lightweight 62.5 kg	(Japan) Fumiya Osawa	def.	(China) Liu Wei	Decision (Majority)	3	3:00	Lightweight GP Quarter-Finals
Lightweight 62.5 kg	(Japan) Kyoshiro	def.	(Australia) Indigo Boyd	KO (Punch)	3	2:15	Lightweight GP Quarter-Finals
Lightweight 62.5 kg	(Japan) Yuto Shinohara	def.	(Thailand) Gonnapar Weerasakreck	KO (Punch)	1	0:25	Lightweight GP Quarter-Finals
Lightweight 62.5 kg	(Japan) Kenta Hayashi	def.	(Spain) Nicolas Gaffie	Decision (Split)	3	3:00	Lightweight GP Quarter-Finals
Lightweight 62.5 kg	(Japan) Shinichiro Kawasaki	def.	(Japan) Hisaki Higashimoto	Ext.Round Decision (Unanimous)	4	3:00	Lightweight GP Reserve Fight
Preliminary Card
Featherweight 57.5 kg	(Japan) Tetsu	def.	(Japan) Masafumi Kurasaki	Decision (Unanimous)	3	3:00	
Lightweight 62.5 kg	(Japan) Seiya	def.	(Japan) Koji Suzuki	Decision (Unanimous)	3	3:00	
Super Bantamweight 55 kg	(Japan) Aoshi	vs.	(Japan) Yuto Kuroda	Draw (Split)	3	3:00	

=== K-1 World GP 2018 Lightweight Tournament bracket ===
Quarter-Finals
(Japan) Kenta Hayashi	SD
(Spain) Nicolas Gaffie	3r.
(Japan) Yuto Shinohara	KO
(Thailand) Gonnapar Weerasakreck	1r.
(Japan) Kyoshiro	KO
(Australia) Indigo Boyd	3r.
(Japan) Fumiya Osawa	MD
(China) Liu Wei	3r.

Semi-Finals
(Japan) Kenta Hayashi	KO
(Japan) Yuto Shinohara	1r.
(Japan) Fumiya Osawa	KO
(Japan) Kyoshiro	2r.

Final
(Japan) Kenta Hayashi	KO
(Japan) Fumiya Osawa	3r.

== See also ==
- 2018 in Glory
- 2018 in Glory of Heroes
- 2018 in Kunlun Fight
- 2018 in ONE Championship
- 2018 in Romanian kickboxing
