= Elias Mahmoudi =

French-Algerian Muay Thai fighter

- Born: January 14, 1998 (age 28); Creteil, France
- Other names: The Sniper
- Height: 1.78 m (5 ft 10 in)
- Weight: 61 kg (134 lb; 9.6 st)
- Division: Bantamweight
- Style: Muay Thai
- Stance: Orthodox
- Fighting out of: Bonneuil-sur-Marne, France
- Team: Mahmoudi Gym
- Trainer: Nordine Mahmoudi, Amar Mahmoudi, Christophe Leveque
- Years active: 2009 - present

Kickboxing record
- Total: 30
- Wins: 22
- By knockout: 10
- Losses: 7
- No contests: 1

Elias Mahmoudi is a French-Algerian Muay Thai fighter who competes in the Flyweight division. He is the former WPMF World 61 kg and WBC Muaythai International super featherweight champion.

== Muay Thai career ==
Mahmoudi faced Ryan Sheehan at Best of Siam VII on December 11, 2015. He won the fight by unanimous decision.

Mahmoudi won his first major title in January 2018, when he defeated Luca Roma by a first-round knockout to win the WPMF World 61 kg title.

In February 2019, Mahmoudi fought Rustam Vyntu at Ring War for the WBC Muay Thai International Super Featherweight title. He beat Vyntu by a third-round TKO.

=== ONE Championship ===
Elias Mahmoudi made his ONE debut on January 25, 2019 at ONE Championship: Hero's Ascent, facing Yukinori Ogasawara. He won his promotional debut by unanimous decision.

On May 10, 2019, he fought Petchdam Petchyindee Academy at ONE Championship: Warriors Of Light for the ONE Flyweight Kickboxing World Championship. The fight went to a technical decision in the fourth round, as Elias was unable to continue the fight due to an illegal blow. Petchdam won the fight by unanimous decision.

He had one more fight with ONE Championship in 2019, against Lerdsila Chumpairtour at ONE Championship: Mark Of Greatness. Mahmoudi won the fight by unanimous decision.

He was scheduled to challenge for the Arena Fight title against Djany Fiorenti during AFC 2, but the fight was later postponed due to the COVID-19 pandemic.

After a year of inactivity, Mahmoudi is scheduled to face former ONE Flyweight Muay Thai World Champion Jonathan Haggerty at ONE on TNT 4 on April 28, 2021. However, the fight was canceled for unknown reasons.

Mahmoudi faced Mongkolpetch Petchyindee Academy in the main event of ONE Championship: Full Blast 2 on June 11, 2021. Mahmoudi lost the fight by majority decision.

Mahmoudi was scheduled to face Walter Goncalves at ONE Championship: Heavy Hitters on January 14, 2022. However, the bout was scrapped due to COVID-19 related reasons.

Mahmoudi was scheduled to face Tagir Khalilov on July 15, 2023, at ONE Fight Night 12. However, Khalilov was rescheduled for another bout and Mahmoudi instead faced Edgar Tabares on August 5, 2023 at ONE Fight Night 13, winning the bout with ease after knocking down Tabares three times in the first round.

Mahmoudi was scheduled to face Superlek Kiatmuu9 for the ONE Flyweight Kickboxing World Championship on January 13, 2024, at ONE Fight Night 18. However, Mahmoudi withdrew from the bout due to rib injury.

Mahmoudi faced Taiki Naito on August 3, 2024, at ONE Fight Night 24. He won the fight via knockout in round three and earned the $50,000 Performance of the Night bonus.

==== Doping suspension ====
Mahmoudi faced Denis Purić on December 7, 2024, at ONE Fight Night 26. He won the fight via knockout at 2:58 in the third round. The fight was later overturned on January 31, 2025, because Mahmoudi tested positive for meldonium and he was suspended for six months.

== Titles and accomplishments ==
=== Amateur ===
- 2014 Siam Fight Junior Champion
- 2013 ICO Junior −50 kg World Champion
- 2013 IFMA Junior −48 kg World Champion
- France Muay Thai Champion

=== Professional ===
- 2019 WBC Muay Thai International Super Featherweight Champion
- 2018 WPMF World −61 kg Champion
- 2009 Theprasit Stadium Champion

== Fight record ==
Kickboxing record
22 Wins (10 (T)KO's), 7 Losses, 0 Draw, 1 No Contest
Date	Result	Opponent	Event	Location	Method	Round	Time
2024-12-06	NC	(Canada) Denis Purić	ONE Fight Night 26	Bangkok, Thailand	NC (overturned)	3	2:58
Originally a KO (knees to the body and punches) win for Mahmoudi; overturned after he tested positive for meldonium.
2024-08-03	Win	(Japan) Taiki Naito	ONE Fight Night 24	Bangkok, Thailand	KO (Spinning backfist)	3	2:56
2023-08-05	Win	(Mexico) Edgar Tabares	ONE Fight Night 13	Bangkok, Thailand	TKO (knees)	1	1:38
2021-06-11	Loss	(Thailand) Mongkolpetch Petchyindee Academy	ONE: Full Blast 2	Singapore	Decision (Majority)	3	3:00
2019-12-09	Win	(Thailand) Lerdsila Chumpairtour	ONE: Mark Of Greatness	Kuala Lumpur, Malaysia	Decision (Unanimous)	3	3:00
2019-05-10	Loss	(Thailand) Petchdam Petchyindee Academy	ONE: Warriors Of Light	Bangkok, Thailand	Technical Decision (unanimous)	5	0:29
For the inaugural ONE Flyweight Kickboxing World Championship. Accidental kick to the groin rendered Mahmoudi unable to continue.
2019-02-23	Win	(Ukraine) Rustam Vyntu	Ring War	Italy	TKO (Punches)	3	
Wins the WBC Muay Thai International Super Featherweight title
2019-01-25	Win	(Japan) Yukinori Ogasawara	ONE: Hero's Ascent	Pasay, Philippines	Decision	3	3:00
2018-10-21	Win	(United Kingdom) Macauley Coyle	Muay Thai Grand Prix	Paris, France	KO (Right High Kick)	2	
2018-06-17	Loss	(Japan) Yuta Murakoshi	K-1 World GP 2018: Featherweight Championship Tournament, Quarter Final	Saitama, Japan	Ext.R Decision (Split)	4	3:00
2018-02-27	Loss	(Thailand) Rangkhao Wor.Sangprapai	Best Of Siam XII, Lumpinee Stadium	Bangkok, Thailand	Decision	5	3:00
2018-01-27	Win	(Italy) Luca Roma	Thai Boxe Mania 2018	Italy	KO (Front Kick)	1	
Wins the WPMF World −61kg title
2017-11-18	Win	(China) Yin Shuai	Glory of Heroes: China vs. Switzerland	Martigny, Switzerland	Decision	3	3:00
2017-10-28	Win	(France) Madiale Samb	Muay Thai Grand Prix, Final	Paris, France	Decision	3	3:00
2017-10-28	Win	(France) Frédéric Manach	Muay Thai Grand Prix, Semi Final	Paris, France	Decision	3	3:00
2017-04-02	Loss	(Japan) Haruma Saikyo	Krush.75	Japan	Decision (Majority)	3	3:00
2017-01-28	Win	(Spain) Carlos Coello Canales	Thai Boxe Mania 2017	Italy	Decision	3	3:00
2016-11-03	Loss	(Japan) Kaito Ozawa	K-1 World GP 2016 -57.5 kg World Tournament, Semi Final	Tokyo, Japan	Decision (Unanimous)	3	3:00
2016-11-03	Win	(Japan) Ryuma Tobe	K-1 World GP 2016 -57.5 kg World Tournament, Quarter Final	Tokyo, Japan	Decision (Unanimous)	3	3:00
2016-09-17	Loss	(China) Feng Tianhao	Rise of Heroes 1 57 kg Tournament Semi finals	Chaoyang, China	Decision	3	3:00
2016-01-30	Win	(Italy) Andrea Roberti	Thai Boxe Mania 2016	Italy	Decision	3	3:00
2015-12-11	Win	(Republic of Ireland) Ryan Sheehan	Best Of Siam 7	Paris, France	Decision (Unanimous)	5	3:00
2015-07-01	Win	(Morocco) Tarik Totts	Emperor Chok Dee – Young Battle	France	Decision	5	3:00
2015-05-23	Win	(Portugal) Rui Botelho	Radikal Fight Night 3	France	Decision	5	3:00
2015-03-07	Win	(France) Kevin Rouffle	Le Choc des Légendes	France	KO	1	
2014-08	Win	(Thailand)	Rajadamnern Stadium	Bangkok, Thailand	KO (Front Kick)	1	
2014-07	Win	(Thailand)		Thailand	KO	1	
2011-07	Win	(Thailand)	Bangla stadium	Phuket, Thailand	KO (Spinning Elbow)	2	
2009-07	Win	(Thailand)	Theprasit stadium	Pattaya, Thailand	KO (Knee to the body)	1	
Wins the Theprasit Stadium title
Legend: Win Loss Draw/No contest Notes

Amateur Muay Thai record (Incomplete)
Date	Result	Opponent	Event	Location	Method	Round	Time
2014-04-20	Win	(England) Joe Lemaire		England	KO (Knee to the Body)	3	
Wins The AWAKENING Junior Muay Thai European −50kg title
2014-02-28	Win	(United States) Ahmed Ibrahim	Siam Fight Productions	Phoenix, United States	Decision		
Wins the Siam Fight Junior title
2013-11-16	Win	(Scotland) George Mann	Rising Champions	United Kingdom	Decision	5	2:00
Wins the ICO Junior World −50kg title
2013	Win	(Netherlands)		Netherlands	KO (Referee Stoppage)		
2013	Win	(Belgium) Deniz Demirkapu		Belgium	Decision		
2013-03	Win	(Turkey) Ali Karadayi	2013 IFMA Junior World Championship, Final	Istanbul, Turkey	Decision	3	3:00
Wins 2013 IFMA Junior World −48kg title
2013-03	Win	(Kazakhstan) Syoykou Daulet	2013 IFMA Junior World Championship, Semi Final	Istanbul, Turkey	Forfeit		
2013-03	Win	(Ukraine) Chavdar Stanislav	2013 IFMA Junior World Championship, Quarter Final	Istanbul, Turkey	Decision	3	3:00
Legend: Win Loss Draw/No contest Notes

== See also ==
- List of male kickboxers
