= Haruma Saikyo =

Japanese kickboxer (born 1998)

- Born: 西京 春馬; March 19, 1998 (age 28); Ebina, Kanagawa, Japan
- Other names: Speed Monster
- Nationality: Japanese
- Height: 170 cm (5 ft 7 in)
- Weight: 57.5 kg (127 lb; 9.05 st)
- Style: Kickboxing, Karate
- Stance: Southpaw
- Fighting out of: Japan
- Team: K-1 GYM SAGAMI-ONO KREST
- Years active: 2014 - present

Kickboxing record
- Total: 21
- Wins: 15
- By knockout: 5
- Losses: 6
- By knockout: 1

Other information
- Notable relatives: Yuma Saikyo (brother)

Haruma Saikyo is a Japanese kickboxer, fighting out of Tokyo, Japan. He is the former Krush Featherweight champion.

As of 1 August 2020, he is ranked the #9 strawweight in the world by Combat Press.

== Kickboxing career ==
After going 2-1 in his first three fights, Saikyo went on an eight fight winning streak, most notably defeating Yoshiki Takei and Taio Asahisa. His winning streak earned him the chance to challenge Kaito Ozawa for the Krush Featherweight title during Krush 81. He won the title by unanimous decision. He lost his next fight against Tatsuya Tsubakihara by majority decision, before successfully defending his Krush title with an extra round split decision against Yuta Murakoshi.

Haruma took part in the 2018 Featherweight Grand Prix. In the quarter final, he won a close split decision against Hirotaka Asahisa. In the semifinal, he won a unanimous decision against Ryusei Ashizawa. He fought a rematch with Yuta Murakoshi in the tournament final, but lost by TKO due to leg injury.

Following this loss, Saikyo attempted to defend his Krush title for the second time during Krush 97, when he was scheduled to fight Yuki Egawa. Egawa won the fight by majority decision.

Saikyo achieved his first, and only, win of 2019 through a knockout of Jorge Varela in June 2019.

Saikyo participated in the K-1 Featherweight Grand Prix during the K-1 World GP 2019 Yokohamatsuri event. He fought Arthur Meyer in the quarter final, and lost by TKO breaking his leg during the second round.

Saikyo faced Riku Morisaka at K-1 World GP 2022 Yokohamatsuri on September 11, 2022, following a close to three-year absence from the sport. He lost the fight by split decision, after an extra fourth round was contested.

== Titles and accomplishments ==
Professional

- K-1
  - 2018 K-1 World GP -57.5kg World Tournament Runner-Up
- Krush
  - 2017 Krush Featherweight -58 kg Champion(1 Defense)

Amateur

- 2015 K-1 Koshien -55 kg Champion
- 2014 All Japan Shin Karate K-2 Grand Prix Lightweight Champion
- 2013 REBELS Blow-Cup Tournament -60 kg Champion
- 2013 Shin Karate Tokyo K-2 Tournament Lightweight Champion

== Kickboxing record ==
Professional Kickboxing Record
15 Wins (5 (T)KO's), 6 Losses, 0 Draw, 0 No Contest
Date	Result	Opponent	Event	Location	Method	Round	Time
2022-09-11	Loss	(Japan) Riku Morisaka	K-1 World GP 2022 Yokohamatsuri	Yokohama, Japan	Ext.R Decision (Split)	4	3:00
2019-11-24	Loss	(France) Arthur Meyer	K-1 World GP 2019 Yokohamatsuri, -57 kg Tournament Quarter Final	Yokohama, Japan	TKO (Leg injury/Low Kick)	2	1:59
2019-06-30	Win	(Spain) Jorge Varela	K-1 World GP 2019 Super Bantamweight World Tournament	Saitama, Japan	KO (Knee to the head)	3	1:27
2019-01-26	Loss	(Japan) Yuki Egawa	Krush.97	Tokyo, Japan	Decision (Majority)	3	3:00
Lost the Krush Featherweight Title.
2018-06-17	Loss	(Japan) Yuta Murakoshi	K-1 World GP 2018: 2nd Featherweight Championship Tournament, Final	Saitama, Japan	TKO (Ankle Injury)	1	0:49
Fight was for K-1 -57.5kg World Tournament.
2018-06-17	Win	(Japan) Ryusei Ashizawa	K-1 World GP 2018: 2nd Featherweight Championship Tournament, Semi Finals	Saitama, Japan	Decision (Unanimous)	3	3:00
2018-06-17	Win	(Japan) Hirotaka Asahisa	K-1 World GP 2018: 2nd Featherweight Championship Tournament, Quarter Finals	Saitama, Japan	Decision (Split)	3	3:00
2018-03-10	Win	(Japan) Yuta Murakoshi	Krush.86	Tokyo, Japan	Extra Round Decision (Split)	4	3:00
Defended the Krush Featherweight Title.
2017-12-27	Loss	(Japan) Tatsuya Tsubakihara	K-1 Survival Wars	Tokyo, Japan	Decision (Majority)	3	3:00
2017-10-01	Win	(Japan) Kaito Ozawa	Krush.81	Tokyo, Japan	Decision (Unanimous)	3	3:00
Wins the Krush Featherweight Title.
2017-06-18	Win	(Japan) Kaito Ozawa	K-1 World GP 2017 Super Middleweight Championship Tournament	Saitama, Japan	Decision (Unanimous)	3	3:00
2017-04-02	Win	(France) Elias Mahmoudi	Krush.75	Tokyo, Japan	Decision (Majority)	3	3:00
2016-12-03	Win	(China) Chen Qicong	Wu Lin Feng 2016: WLF x Krush - China vs Japan	Zhengzhou, China	Decision (Unanimous)	3	3:00
2016-10-15	Win	(Japan) Shota Oiwa	Krush.70	Tokyo, Japan	TKO (Referee Stoppage/Punches)	1	0:31
2016-06-24	Win	(Japan) Taio Asahisa	K-1 World GP 2016 -65kg World Tournament	Tokyo, Japan	Decision (Majority)	3	3:00
2016-04-10	Win	(Japan) Takaaki	Krush.65	Tokyo, Japan	KO (Body kick)	2	2:10
2015-04-19	Win	(Japan) Yoshiki Takei	K-1 World GP 2015 -55kg Championship Tournament	Tokyo, Japan	Decision (Majority)	3	3:00
2015-01-04	Win	(Japan) Yoshiki	Krush.49	Tokyo, Japan	KO (Left High Kick)	1	0:07
2014-11-09	Loss	(Japan) Chikara Iwao	Krush.47	Tokyo, Japan	Decision (Unanimous)	3	3:00
2014-09-15	Win	(Japan) Ryota	Krush-EX 2014 vol.5	Tokyo, Japan	Decision (Unanimous)	3	3:00
2014-06-12	Win	(Japan) Shishimaru	Krush.42	Tokyo, Japan	TKO (3 knopckdowns)	2	2:42
Legend: Win Loss Draw/No contest Notes

Amateur Kickboxing Record
Date	Result	Opponent	Event	Location	Method	Round	Time
2015-11-21	Win	(Japan) Tatsuya Tsubakihara	K-1 World GP 2015 The Championship, K-1 Koshien 2015 Tournament Final	Tokyo, Japan	Decision (Split)	3	2:00
Wins the 2015 Koshien -55kg title.
2015-08-15	Win	(Japan) Rikuto Morishita	K-1 Koshien 2015 Tournament, Semi Final	Tokyo, Japan	Decision (Majority)	1	3:00
2015-08-15	Win	(Japan) Tomoya Yokoyama	K-1 Koshien 2015 Tournament, Quarter Final	Tokyo, Japan	Ext.R Decision (Majority)	2	3:00
2015-08-15	Win	(Japan) Sho Uchida	K-1 Koshien 2015 Tournament, First Round	Tokyo, Japan	Decision (Majority)	1	3:00
2014-07-21	Loss	(Japan) Yuto Shinohara	K-1 Koshien 2014 Tournament, Quarter Final	Tokyo, Japan	Decision (Unanimous)	1	2:00
2014-07-21	Win	(Japan) Naoki Takahashi	K-1 Koshien 2014 Tournament, Second Round	Tokyo, Japan	Decision (Majority)	1	2:00
2014-07-21	Win	(Japan) Shunki Iwamoto	K-1 Koshien 2014 Tournament, First Round	Tokyo, Japan	Decision (Unanimous)	1	2:00
2013-12-22	Win	(Japan) Koji Ueno	REBELS Amateur BLOW-CUP 23 Tournament, Final	Tokyo, Japan	Decision	1	3:00
Wins BLOW-CUP 23 Tournament title
2013-12-22	Win	(Japan) Shinjiro Saito	REBELS Amateur BLOW-CUP 23 Tournament, Semi Final	Tokyo, Japan	KO	1	
2013-12-22	Win	(Japan) Shinnosuke Nakamura	REBELS Amateur BLOW-CUP 23 Tournament, Quarter Final	Tokyo, Japan	Decision	1	3:00
2012-06-03	Loss	(Japan) Tenshin Nasukawa	BigBang 8	Tokyo, Japan	Decision	3	2:00
2011-12-04	Win	(Japan) Shogo Hosoda	4th Kokusai Junior Kickboxing	Tokyo, Japan	Decision		
2011-07-18	Loss	(Japan) Tenshin Nasukawa	MA Kick BREAK-16 - GRASP	Tokyo, Japan	Decision	3	1:30
For the MA Kick Junior -42kg title
2011-04-24	Loss	(Japan) Tenshin Nasukawa	MA Kick BREAK-12 -It starts-	Tokyo, Japan	Decision	3	1:30
Lost the MA Kick Junior -42kg title
2011-04-17	Win	(Japan) Yuzuki Sakai	MA Kick Amateur 135	Tokyo, Japan	Decision	2	1:30
2009-09-27	Loss	(Japan) Yoshiki Takei		Saitama Prefecture, Japan			
Legend: Win Loss Draw/No contest Notes

== See also ==
- List of male kickboxers
