= ONE Fight Night 32 =

Combat sport events in 2025

ONE Fight Night 32: Nakrob vs. Jaosuayai
- The poster for ONE Fight Night 32: Nakrob vs. Jaosuayai
- Promotion: ONE Championship
- Date: June 7, 2025
- Venue: Lumpinee Boxing Stadium
- City: Bangkok, Thailand

Event chronology
ONE Friday Fights 111: Phetsukumvit vs. Vitez	ONE Fight Night 32: Nakrob vs. Jaosuayai	ONE Friday Fights 112: Singdomthong vs. Ondash

ONE Fight Night 32: Nakrob vs. Jaosuayai was a combat sports event produced by ONE Championship that took place on June 7, 2025, at Lumpinee Boxing Stadium in Bangkok, Thailand.

== Background ==
A ONE Women's Atomweight Muay Thai World Championship bout between current champion Allycia Rodrigues and Shir Cohen was expected to headline the event. The pairing was previously scheduled to headline at ONE Fight Night 29 in early March, but Cohen withdrew due to suffered as injury. In turn, Cohen withdrew from the bout once again due to injury.

A flyweight Muay Thai bout between Nakrob Fairtex and Jaosuayai Mor. Krungthepthonburi was originally scheduled to headline the event, but the bout was shifted to the co-main event instead. In turn, the bout was promoted to main event again after Cohen withdrew.

On June 4, two bouts between Rambolek Chor.Ajalaboon vs. Dimitrii Kovtun and Alibeg Rasulov vs. Maurice Abévi were removed from the event due to Rambolek's suffered an illness and Abévi's injury. In addition, the promotion added two bouts instead between Tagir Khalilov vs. Liao Shixu and Ricardo Bravo vs. Arian Esparza.

At the weigh-ins, three fighters failed to hydration test and missed weight for their respective fights:

- Diego Paez weighed in at 140.5 pounds, 5.5 pounds over the flyweight limit and he was fined 30 percent of his purse which went to Johan Ghazali.
- Ibragim Dauev weighed in at 160.5 pounds, 5.5 pounds over the featherweight limit and he was fined 30 percent of his purse which went to Magomed Akaev.
- Dzhabir Dzhabrailov weighted in at 177 pounds, 7 pounds over the lightweight limit and he was fined 25 percent of his purse which went to Nicolas Alejandro Vigna.

== Results ==
Fight card (Amazon Prime Video)
Weight class				Method	Round	Time	Notes
Flyweight Muay Thai	Jaosuayai Mor. Krungthepthonburi	def.	Nakrob Fairtex	KO (punches and head kick)	1	0:53
Strawweight Muay Thai	Aliff Sor.Dechapan	def.	Elmehdi El Jamari	Decision (unanimous)	3	3:00	(Note: ONE Strawweight Muay Thai title eliminator.)
Flyweight Muay Thai	Diego Paez	def.	Johan Ghazali	Decision (split)	3	3:00	(Note: Paez missed weight (140.5 lb).)
Flyweight Muay Thai	Taiki Naito	def.	Johan Estupiñan	Decision (majority)	3	3:00
Featherweight	Ibragim Dauev	def.	Magomed Akaev	Decision (split)	3	5:00	(Note: Dauev missed weight (160.5 lb).)
Featherweight Muay Thai	Arian Esparza	def.	Ricardo Bravo	Decision (unanimous)	3	3:00
Lightweight	Dzhabir Dzhabrailov	def.	Nicolas Alejandro Vigna	TKO (punches)	1	1:43	(Note: Dzhabrailov missed weight (177 lb).)
Catchweight (140 lbs) Muay Thai	Tagir Khalilov	def.	Liao Shixu	Decision (unanimous)	3	3:00

== Bonus awards ==
The following fighters received $50,000 bonuses:

- Performance of the Night: Jaosuayai Mor. Krungthepthonburi

== See also ==
- 2025 in ONE Championship
- List of ONE Championship events
- List of current ONE fighters
- ONE Championship Rankings
