= Tomoya Yokoyama =

Japanese kickboxer (born 2000)

- Born: 横山 朋哉; March 20, 2000 (age 26); Ōta, Gunma, Japan
- Height: 168 cm (5 ft 6 in)
- Weight: 60 kg (130 lb; 9.4 st)
- Style: Kickboxing
- Stance: Southpaw
- Fighting out of: Ōta, Gunma, Japan
- Team: Libre Roi
- Years active: 2016 - present

Kickboxing record
- Total: 29
- Wins: 24
- By knockout: 13
- Losses: 5
- By knockout: 1

Other information
- Notable relatives: Takumi Yokoyama (brother)

Tomoya Yokoyama (横山 朋哉, Yokoyama Tomoya) is a Japanese kickboxer, currently competing in the super featherweight division of K-1. He is the current K-1 Super Featherweight Champion.

As of November 2021, he was the #6 ranked Bantamweight in the world by Combat Press.

== Kickboxing career ==
=== J-NETWORK ===
Yokoyama made his professional debut against Tadakatsu at J-FIGHT & J-GIRLS 2016 1st on March 27, 2016. He won the fight by unanimous decision.

Yokoyama was scheduled to face Yoshifumi Fujita at J-KICK 2016～Honor the fighting spirits～3rd on October 10, 2016. He won the fight by unanimous decision.

Yokoyama was scheduled to face SHUN JANJIRA at J-FIGHT & J-GIRLS 2017～J-NETWORK 20th Anniversary～2nd on April 23, 2017. He suffered his first professional loss, as he dropped a unanimous decision to Shun.

=== K-1 ===
Yokoyama was scheduled to make his K-1 debut against Kazuma Kubo at K-1 WORLD GP 2018 JAPAN Featherweight Tournament on June 17, 2018. He won the fight by a third-round knockout.

Yokoyama was scheduled to face Takuma Kawaguchi at KHAOS.6 on September 1, 2018. The fight was ruled a unanimous decision draw after the first three rounds were contested, with all three judges scoring it an even 29-29. Yokoyama was awarded the unanimous decision, after an extra round was fought.

Yokoyama was scheduled to face Yuya at K-1 WORLD GP 2018 JAPAN Super Lightweight Tournament on November 3, 2018. He won the fight by a first-round knockout.

Yokoyama was scheduled to face Yuto Saito at Krush.99 on March 30, 2019. He won the fight by a first-round knockout.

Yokoyama was scheduled to face the future K-1 Lightweight champion Taio Asahisa at Krush 104 on August 31, 2019. Asahisa won the fight by unanimous decision.

Yokoyama was scheduled to face Chihiro Nakajima at Krush 111 on February 24, 2020. He won the fight by unanimous decision.

Yokoyama was scheduled to face the former Krush Super Featherweight champion Yuma Saikyo at Krush.117 on September 26, 2020. He won the fight by unanimous decision.

Yokoyama was then scheduled to fight TETSU at K-1: K’Festa 4 on January 24, 2021. The event was later rescheduled for March 31, 2021. Eleven days before the event, TETSU withdrew from the bout due to a torn meniscus, and was replaced by Yusuke. Yokoyama won the fight by knockout, stopping his opponent after just 29 seconds.

==== Krush Super Featherweight tournament ====
Yokoyama participated in the 2021 Krush Super Featherweight tournament. He was scheduled to face Ryoga Matsumoto in the tournament quarterfinals, held at Krush 130 on October 31, 2021. Yokoyama won the fight by a second-round technical knockout, as he floored Matsumoto with a left hook at the 2:40 minute mark.

Yokoyama faced Naoki Yamamoto in the tournament semifinals, which were held on January 28, 2022. After a poor first round, during which he was knocked down, Yokoyama won the fight by a second-round technical knockdown. He managed to knock Yamamoto down twice by the midway point of the second round, forcing the referee to wave the fight off. He advanced to the tournament finals, which were held on the same day, where he faced Chihiro Nakajima. After an even first two rounds, Nakajima managed to knock Yokoyama down in the third round. This knockdown proved crucial, as Nakajima won the fight by unanimous decision.

==== K-1 Super Featherweight Grand Prix ====
Yokoyama faced Katsuki Ishida at Krush.138 on June 17, 2022. He won the fight by a dominant unanimous decision, with two judges scoring the bout 30–24 in his favor, while the third judge scored it 30–25 for him. Yokoyama knocked Ishida down twice in the first round, first time with repeated left hooks and the second time with a flying knee, and once in the third round, with a left straight.

After successfully rebounding from his loss to Nakajima, Yokoyama took part in the 2022 K-1 Super Featherweight World Grand Prix, held to crown a new champion after the previous titleholder Takeru Segawa vacated the belt. Yokoyama was booked to face the ISKA World K-1 lightweight champion Bailey Sugden in the tournament quarterfinals at K-1 World GP 2022 Yokohamatsuri on September 11, 2022. Sugden withdrew from the fight on August 3, due to an injury, and was replaced by Stavros Exakoustidis. He won the fight by a third-round knockout. Yokoyama failed to advance further in the tournament however, as he lost by a first-round technical knockout to Hirotaka Asahisa, who knocked him down twice by the 0:37 minute mark of the opening round.

==== Later K-1 career ====
Yokoyama faced Petchsamui Shimura at Krush.146 on February 25, 2023. He won the fight by unanimous decision, with all three judges scoring the bout 28–26 in his favor. Although Yokoyama was able to knock his opponent down once apiece in both the first and second round, he was himself knocked down with low kicks in the third and final round of the contest.

Yokoyama faced the two-time Krush super featherweight title challenger Tatsuya Oiwa at K-1 World GP 2023 in Yokohama on June 3, 2023. He won the fight by unanimous decision. Two of the judges scored the fight 28–27 for Yokoyama, while the third judge scored the bout an even 28–28. Both fighters suffered knockdowns in the second round: Oiwa being knocked down with a left straight and Yokoyama with a right hook.

Yokoyama faced the former Krush Featherweight and K-1 Featherweight champion Yuki Egawa at K-1 World GP 2023: ReBOOT～K-1 ReBIRTH～ on September 10, 2023. He won the fight by unanimous decision, with three scorecards of 30–29 in his favor.

=== Krush Super Featherweight champion ===
Yokoyama challenged the Krush Super Featherweight champion Naoki Takahashi at Krush 158 on February 24, 2024. He won the fight by unanimous decision.

Yokoyama faced Cabelo Monteiro at K-1 World MAX 2024 - World Championship Tournament Final on July 7, 2024. He won the fight by a first-round technical knockout.

Yokoyama made the first defense of his Krush Super Featherweight title at Krush 169 on December 8, 2024, against Yuta Matsuyama. He won the fight by third round knockout.

Yokoyama faced Egor Bikrev, who was making his debut with the promotion, in the quarterfinals of the 6th K-1 Super Featherweight World Grand Prix at K-1 Beyond on May 31, 2025. Despite knocking Bikrev down with a kick to the body in the second round, Yokoyama was himself knocked down in the final round of the bout, which led to the bout being judged a draw. Yokoyama won the fight by knockout in the extra fourth round. Yokoyama was expected to face Huang Shuailu in the semifinal bout, however Shuailu was forced to withdraw due to a broken jaw, while tournament reservist Leona Pettas was forced to withdraw with a broken hand. As such, Shuailu's quarterfinals opponent Matthew Daalman stepped in as the replacement. Yokoyama won the fight by a first-round technical knockout. He twice knocked his opponent down which resulted in an automatic stoppage victory under the K-1 tournament ruleset. Yokoyama faced Rémi Parra in the finals of the one-day tournament. He lost the fight by a second-round technical knockout.

Yokoyama faced the former K-1 Super Featherweight champion Leona Pettas at K-1 World MAX 2025 - 70kg World Championship Tournament Final on November 15, 2025. He won the fight by unanimous decision, with scores of 30—27, 30—27 and 29—28.

Tomoya Yokoyama will compete against challenger Thun Menghong of Cambodia for the K-1 world title in the 60 kg division.

== Titles and accomplishments ==
=== Professional ===
- J-NETWORK
  - 2016 J-NETWORK Rookie of the Year Tournament Winner
- Krush
  - 2024 Krush Super Featherweight (-60kg) Champion
  - 2024 Krush Fighter of the Year
- K-1
  - 2025 K-1 Super Featherweight Championship Tournament Runner-up
  - 2026 K-1 Super Featherweight (-60kg) Champion
    - One successful title defense

=== Amateur ===
- J-NETWORK
  - 2015 J-NETWORK All Japan A-League -58 kg Champion
- K-1
  - 2017 K-1 Koshien ‐60 kg Runner-up

== Kickboxing record ==
Kickboxing record
24 Wins (13 (T)KO's), 5 Losses, 0 Draw, 0 No Contest
Date	Result	Opponent	Event	Location	Method	Round	Time
2026-09-12	Win	(Cambodia) Thun Menghong	K-1 World MAX 2026 - World Tournament Opening Round	Tokyo, Japan	KO (Left cross)	2	1:25
Defends the K-1 Super Featherweight Championship.
2026-05-31	Win	(Japan) Yuta Matsuyama	K-1 Revenge	Tokyo, Japan	KO (Left cross)	1	2:21
Wins the interim K-1 Super Featherweight Championship.
2025-11-15	Win	(Japan) Leona Pettas	K-1 World MAX 2025 - 70kg World Championship Tournament Final	Tokyo, Japan	Decision (Unanimous)	3	3:00
2025-05-31	Loss	(France) Rémi Parra	K-1 Beyond - Super Featherweight Championship Tournament, Final	Yokohama, Japan	TKO (3 Knockdowns)	2	1:10
For the 2025 K-1 Super Featherweight Championship Tournament title and the vacant K-1 Super Featherweight Championship.
2025-05-31	Win	(Netherlands) Matthew Daalman	K-1 Beyond - Super Featherweight Championship Tournament, Semifinals	Yokohama, Japan	TKO (2 knockdowns)	1	1:04
2025-05-31	Win	(Russia) Egor Bikrev	K-1 Beyond - Super Featherweight Championship Tournament, Quarterfinals	Yokohama, Japan	KO (Left hook to the body)	4	2:01
2024-12-08	Win	(Japan) Yuta Matsuyama	Krush 169	Tokyo, Japan	TKO (Punches)	3	0:37
Defends the Krush Super Featherweight (-60kg) title.
2024-07-07	Win	(Brazil) Cabelo Monteiro	K-1 World MAX 2024 - World Championship Tournament Final	Tokyo, Japan	TKO (3 Knockdowns)	1	1:47
2024-02-24	Win	(Japan) Naoki Takahashi	Krush 158	Tokyo, Japan	Decision (Unanimous)	3	3:00
Wins the Krush Super Featherweight (-60kg) title.
2023-09-10	Win	(Japan) Yuki Egawa	K-1 World GP 2023: ReBOOT～K-1 ReBIRTH～	Yokohama, Japan	Decision (Unanimous)	3	3:00
2023-06-03	Win	(Japan) Tatsuya Oiwa	K-1 World GP 2023: inaugural Middleweight Championship Tournament	Yokohama, Japan	Decision (Majority)	3	3:00
2023-02-25	Win	(Thailand) Petchsamui Shimura	Krush.146	Tokyo, Japan	Decision (unanimous)	3	3:00
2022-09-11	Loss	(Japan) Hirotaka Asahisa	K-1 World GP 2022 Yokohamatsuri, Tournament Semifinals	Yokohama, Japan	TKO (Two knockdowns)	1	0:37
2022-09-11	Win	(Greece) Stavros Exakoustidis	K-1 World GP 2022 Yokohamatsuri, Tournament Quarterfinals	Yokohama, Japan	KO (High kick)	3	1:41
2022-06-17	Win	(Japan) Katsuki Ishida	Krush.138	Tokyo, Japan	Decision (Unanimous)	3	3:00
2022-01-28	Loss	(Japan) Chihiro Nakajima	Krush 133, -60 kg Championship Tournament Final	Tokyo, Japan	Decision (Unanimous)	3	3:00
For the vacant Krush Super Featherweight (-60kg) title.
2022-01-28	Win	(Japan) Naoki Yamamoto	Krush 133, -60 kg Championship Tournament Semi Finals	Tokyo, Japan	TKO (2 knockdowns rule)	2	1:54
2021-10-31	Win	(Japan) Ryoga Matsumoto	Krush 130, -60 kg Championship Tournament Quarter Finals	Tokyo, Japan	KO (Punches)	2	2:40
2021-03-28	Win	(Japan) Yusuke	K-1 World GP 2021: K’Festa 4 Day.2	Tokyo, Japan	KO (Left cross)	1	0:29
2020-09-26	Win	(Japan) Yuma Saikyo	Krush.117	Tokyo, Japan	Decision (Unanimous)	3	3:00
2020-02-24	Win	(Japan) Chihiro Nakajima	Krush 111	Tokyo, Japan	Decision (Unanimous)	3	3:00
2019-08-31	Loss	(Japan) Taio Asahisa	Krush 104	Tokyo, Japan	Decision (Unanimous)	3	3:00
2019-03-30	Win	(Japan) Yuto Saito	Krush.99	Tokyo, Japan	TKO (Left cross)	1	2:00
2018-11-03	Win	(Japan) Yuya	K-1 WORLD GP 2018 JAPAN Super Lightweight Tournament	Tokyo, Japan	TKO (Left cross)	1	0:35
2018-09-01	Win	(Japan) Takuma Kawaguchi	KHAOS.6	Tokyo, Japan	Ext.R Decision (Unanimous)	4	3:00
2018-06-17	Win	(Japan) Kazuma Kubo	K-1 WORLD GP 2018 JAPAN Featherweight Tournament	Tokyo, Japan	TKO (Punches)	2	2:05
2017-04-23	Loss	(Japan) SHUN JANJIRA	J-FIGHT & J-GIRLS 2017～J-NETWORK 20th Anniversary～2nd	Tokyo, Japan	Decision (Unanimous)	3	3:00
2016-10-10	Win	(Japan) Yoshifumi Fujita	J-KICK 2016～Honor the fighting spirits～3rd	Tokyo, Japan	Decision (Unanimous)	3	3:00
2016-03-27	Win	(Japan) Tadakatsu	J-FIGHT & J-GIRLS 2016 1st	Tokyo, Japan	Decision (Unanimous)	3	3:00
Legend: Win Loss Draw/No contest Notes

Amateur Kickboxing Record
Date	Result	Opponent	Event	Location	Method	Round	Time
2017-11-23	Loss	(Japan) Shoki Kaneda	K-1 World GP 2017 Heavyweight Championship Tournament, Koshien Tournament Final	Saitama, Japan	Decision (Unanimous)	3	2:00
For the 2017 K-1 Koshien -60kg title.
2017-07-29	Win	(Japan) Akihiro Aikawa	K-1 Koshien 2017 Tournament, Semi Final	Tokyo, Japan	Decision (Unanimous)	1	2:00
2017-07-29	Win	(Japan) Shota Tezuka	K-1 Koshien 2017 Tournament, Quarter Final	Tokyo, Japan	KO	1	
2017-07-29	Win	(Japan) Kazuma Okamoto	K-1 Koshien 2017 Tournament, First Round	Tokyo, Japan	KO	1	
2016-07-30	Loss	(Japan) Yuta Hayashi	K-1 Koshien 2016 Tournament, Quarter Final	Tokyo, Japan	Ext.R Decision (Unanimous)	2	2:00
2016-07-30	Win	(Japan) Retsu Akabane	K-1 Koshien 2016 Tournament, Second Round	Tokyo, Japan	Decision (Unanimous)	1	2:00
2016-07-30	Win	(Japan) Riamu Sera	K-1 Koshien 2016 Tournament, First Round	Tokyo, Japan	Decision (Unanimous)	1	2:00
2015-11-22	Win	(Japan) Yuji Nakada	J-NETWORK All Japan Championship, A-League Tournament Final	Tokyo, Japan	Decision (Majority)		
Wins J-NETWORK All Japan A-League -58kg title.
2015-11-22	Win	(Japan) Kosuke Murodate	J-NETWORK All Japan Championship, A-League Tournament Semi Final	Tokyo, Japan	Decision (Unanimous)		
2015-11-22	Win	(Japan) Shun Sato	J-NETWORK All Japan Championship, A-League Tournament Quarter Final	Tokyo, Japan	Ext.R Decision (Split)		
2015-11-22	Win	(Japan) Takumi Kumagaya	J-NETWORK All Japan Championship, A-League Tournament First Round	Tokyo, Japan	Decision (Unanimous)		
2015-09-06	Win	(Japan) Hiroki Kawate	J-FIGHT 44 - J-NETWORK Amateur Championship Tournament, Final	Tokyo, Japan	Decision (Unanimous)	1	3:00
Wins J-GROW -58kg title.
2015-08-15	Loss	(Japan) Haruma Saikyo	K-1 Koshien 2015 Tournament, Quarter Final	Tokyo, Japan	Ext.R Decision	2	2:00
2015-08-15	Win	(Japan) Kenta Izumi	K-1 Koshien 2015 Tournament, First Round	Tokyo, Japan	KO	1	
2015-05-24	Win	(Japan) Yuji Nakada	J-NETWORK 4th Amateur Championship Tournament, Semi Final	Tokyo, Japan	Decision (Unanimous)	1	3:00
2014-11-23	Loss	(Japan) Kyohei Isoda	J-NETWORK All Japan Championship, A-League Tournament First Round	Tokyo, Japan	Ext.R Decision (Split)		
Legend: Win Loss Draw/No contest Notes

== See also ==
- List of male kickboxers
