= Alejandro Rivas =

Spanish kickboxer (born 2001)

- Born: Alejandro Rivas Concepcion; February 12, 2001 (age 25); El Puerto de Santa María, Spain
- Other names: El Puma
- Nationality: (Spain) Spanish
- Height: 1.68 m (5 ft 6 in)
- Weight: 57 kg (126 lb; 9.0 st)
- Style: Kickboxing
- Stance: Orthodox
- Fighting out of: Seville, Spain
- Team: Team Jesus Cabello

Kickboxing record
- Total: 55
- Wins: 48
- Losses: 7
- By knockout: 1

Alejandro "Alex" Rivas Concepcion is a Spanish kickboxer currently fighting out of Team Jesus Cabello.

As of May 2019, he was ranked the #3 Strawweight in the world by Combat Press.

== Biography and career ==
In 2018 Rivas became renowned when he got an upset decision win over K-1 featherweight title holder Yuta Murakoshi at only 17 years old. He then faced K-1 Super Bantamweight champion Yoshiki Takei in the quarter-final of the 2019 K-1 World Super Bantamweight Tournament and lost by first-round TKO.

In August 2019, Rivas signed a two-year contract with the ONE Championship organization. He is scheduled to make his promotional debut against ONE Flyweight Muay Thai World Champion Rodtang Jitmuangnon in a non-title kickboxing match at ONE Championship: Fists Of Fury on February 26, 2021.

== Titles ==
Amateur

- 2017 WKPF Intercontinental -57 kg Champion
- 2015 ISKA Amateur full-contact Europe Champion
- 2015 ISKA Amateur K-1 rules Spain Champion

== Pro Kickboxing record ==
Pro Kickboxing Record
Date	Result	Opponent	Event	Location	Method	Round	Time
2019-06-30	Loss	(Japan) Yoshiki Takei	K-1 World GP 2019: Super Bantamweight World Tournament, Quarter Finals	Tokyo, Japan	TKO (2 knockdowns rule)	1	
2018-11-03	Win	(Japan) Yuta Murakoshi	K-1 World GP 2018: 3rd Super Lightweight Championship Tournament	Saitama, Japan	Decision	3	3:00
2018-06-09	Loss	(England) Thai Barlow	Enfusion Newcastle	Newcastle, England	Decision (Extra round)	4	3:00
2018-03-10	Loss	(Portugal) Helder Victor	Dynamite Fight Night 32	Albufeira, Portugal	Decision	3	3:00
2018-01-27	Loss	(Portugal) Frederico Cordeiro	Brothers League VII	Portugal	Decision	3	3:00
2017-05-27	Loss	(Spain) Manu Gomez	Shocktime Promotions	Spain	Decision	3	3:00
2017-05-06	Loss	(England) Evan Jays	Muay Thai Grand Prix 2	London, England	Decision	3	3:00
Legend: Win Loss Draw/No contest Notes

== See also ==
- List of male kickboxers
