= Kaito Ozawa =

Japanese kickboxer

- Born: April 27, 1993 (age 33); Fukushima Prefecture, Japan
- Nationality: Japanese
- Height: 165 cm (5 ft 5 in)
- Weight: 57.5 kg (127 lb; 9.05 st)
- Division: Flyweight; Super Flyweight.
- Style: Kickboxing, Karate
- Stance: Southpaw
- Fighting out of: Tokyo, Japan
- Team: K-1 GYM Silver Wolf
- Years active: 2014 - present

Kickboxing record
- Total: 26
- Wins: 15
- By knockout: 7
- Losses: 9
- By knockout: 2
- Draws: 2

Ozawa Kaito (小澤 海斗) is a Japanese kickboxer, signed with K-1. He is the 2016 K-1 Featherweight Grand Prix runner-up and the former Krush Featherweight champion.

== Kickboxing career ==
=== Early career ===
Ozawa made his professional debut in June 2014, at Krush 42, against Kento Ito. The fight ended in a draw. Ozawa then won his next six fights, including a rematch with Kento Ito, before suffering the first professional loss of his career, dropping a majority decision against Hirotaka Asahisa. In his next fight, at Krush 61, Ozawa fought Kento Ito for the third time, with the fight ending in a draw.

=== Krush title reign ===
At Krush 63, Ozawa fought Shota Kanbe for the Krush Featherweight title. He beat Kanbe by majority decision. Ozawa then fought the K-1 Super Bantamweight champion Takeru Segawa in February 2016. During the pre-fight stare down, the two fighters came to blows, and had to be separated by the security. Takeru won the fight by unanimous decision. Kaito then returned to Krush, to defend his title against Tatsuya Oiwa at Krush 68. The fight went into an extra round, after which Ozawa won by decision.

Ozawa took part in the 2016 K-1 Featherweight GP. He knocked out Josh Tonna in the quarterfinal, and defeated Elias Mahmoudi by unanimous decision in the semifinal, but lost to Takeru Segawa by unanimous decision in the final bout.

He successfully defended the Krush title for the second time against Yun Qi, winning by majority decision. Ozawa would then suffer back-to-back losses to Haruma Saikyo, losing both times by unanimous decision. In their second fight, Ozawa lost the Krush title as well.

=== Post title reign ===
Ozawa rebounded from this loss with a 49 second knockout of Yuzuki Satomi, before losing to Jorge Varela in the 2018 K-1 Featherweight GP and Ryusei Ashizawa three months later.

During K-1 World GP 2019: K’FESTA 2, Ozawa won a unanimous decision against Hayato. Three months later, he won another unanimous decision, against Takahiro. He was then scheduled to fight Jawsuayai Sor.Dechaphan at K-1: K’Festa 3. Jawasuayai won by TKO, after the ringside doctor stopped the fight at the end of the second round. He lost his next fight to Tatsuki Shinotsuka at K-1: K'Festa 4 Day 1 as well, dropping a split decision.

Ozawa was scheduled to face Yuta Kunieda at K-1 World GP 2021: Yokohamatsuri on September 20, 2021. He won the fight by unanimous decision.

Ozawa was scheduled to face Shuhei Kumura at K-1 World GP 2022 Japan on February 27, 2022. He lost the fight by unanimous decision, with all three judges scoring the bout 30–29 for Kumura.

Ozawa was expected to face Tatsuya Oiwa at K-1 World GP 2023: K'Festa 6 on March 12, 2023. Ozawa withdrew from the fight on March 8, due to a bone contusion of a metacarpal bone, and was replaced by Yuta Kuneida.

== Titles and accomplishments ==
Professional

- 2016 K-1 World GP −57.5 kg World Tournament Runner-up
- 2016 Krush Featherweight Champion

== Kickboxing record ==
Professional Kickboxing Record
15 Wins (7 (T)KO's), 10 Losses, 2 Draw, 0 No Contest
Date	Result	Opponent	Event	Location	Method	Round	Time
2022-02-27	Loss	(Japan) Shuhei Kumura	K-1 World GP 2022 Japan	Tokyo, Japan	Decision (Unanimous)	3	3:00
2021-09-20	Win	(Japan) Yuta Kunieda	K-1 World GP 2021: Yokohamatsuri	Yokohama, Japan	Decision (Unanimous)	3	3:00
2021-03-21	Loss	(Japan) Tatsuki Shinotsuka	K-1: K'Festa 4 Day 1	Tokyo, Japan	Ext.R Decision (Split)	4	3:00
2020-03-22	Loss	(Thailand) Jawsuayai Sor.Dechaphan	K-1: K’Festa 3	Saitama, Japan	TKO (Doctor Stoppage)	2	3:00
2019-06-03	Win	(Japan) Takahiro	K-1 World GP 2019: Super Bantamweight World Tournament	Osaka, Japan	Decision (Unanimous)	3	3:00
2019-03-10	Win	(Japan) Hayato	K-1 World GP 2019: K’FESTA 2	Saitama, Japan	Ext.R Decision	4	3:00
2018-09-24	Loss	(Japan) Ryusei Ashizawa	K-1 World GP 2018: inaugural Cruiserweight Championship Tournament	Saitama, Japan	Decision (Unanimous)	3	3:00
2018-06-17	Loss	(Spain) Jorge Varela	K-1 World GP 2018 -57.5 kg World Tournament, Quarter Final	Tokyo, Japan	TKO (2 Knockdowns)	1	2:57
2018-02-12	Win	(Japan) Yuzuki Satomi	Krush.85	Tokyo, Japan	KO (Left Middle Kick)	1	0:49
2017-10-01	Loss	(Japan) Haruma Saikyo	Krush.81	Japan	Decision (Unanimous)	3	3:00
Lost the Krush Featherweight Title.
2017-06-18	Loss	(Japan) Haruma Saikyo	K-1 World GP 2017 Super Middleweight Championship Tournament	Japan	Decision (Unanimous)	3	3:00
2017-03-03	Win	(China) Yun Qi	Krush.74	Tokyo, Japan	Decision (Majority)	3	3:00
Defends the Krush Featherweight yitle.
2016-11-03	Loss	(Japan) Takeru	K-1 World GP 2016 Featherweight World Tournament, Final	Tokyo, Japan	Decision (Unanimous)	3	3:00
For the K-1 World GP 2016 -57.5kg World Tournament.
2016-11-03	Win	(France) Elias Mahmoudi	K-1 World GP 2016 Featherweight World Tournament, Semi Final	Tokyo, Japan	Decision (Unanimous)	3	3:00
2016-11-03	Win	(Australia) Josh Tonna	K-1 World GP 2016 Featherweight World Tournament, Quarter Final	Tokyo, Japan	KO (Knee to the body)	1	0:57
2016-08-20	Win	(Japan) Tatsuya Oiwa	Krush.68 ～in NAGOYA～	Nagoya, Japan	Ext.R Decision (Unanimous)	4	3:00
Defended the Krush Featherweight title.
2016-06-24	Loss	(Japan) Takeru	K-1 World GP 2016 -65kg World Tournament	Tokyo, Japan	Decision (Unanimous)	3	3:00
2016-02-05	Win	(Japan) Shota Kanbe	Krush.63	Tokyo, Japan	Decision (Majority)	3	3:00
Wins the Krush Featherweight title.
2015-12-04	Draw	(Japan) Kento Ito	Krush.61	Tokyo, Japan	Decision	3	3:00
2015-10-04	Loss	(Japan) Hirotaka Asahisa	Krush.59	Tokyo, Japan	Decision (Majority)	3	3:00
2015-08-14	Win	(Japan) Kyohei Hayashi	Krush.56	Tokyo, Japan	KO (Flying Knee)	1	1:48
2015-05-04	Win	(Japan) Shoya Masumoto	Krush.54	Tokyo, Japan	KO (Right Cross)	3	0:40
2015-03-14	Win	(Japan) Hikaru Fujihashi	Krush.52	Tokyo, Japan	Decision (Unanimous)	3	3:00
2015-12-21	Win	(Japan) Ryota	Krush.48 ～in SENDAI～	Sendai, Japan	KO (Right Hook)	2	0:36
2014-11-03	Win	(Japan) Kento Ito	K-1 World GP 2014 -65kg Championship Tournament	Japan	TKO (3 Knockdowns)	2	1:52
2014-09-15	Win	(Japan) Masashi Yamakawa	Krush-EX 2014 vol.5	Tokyo, Japan	KO	1	2:30
2014-06-12	Draw	(Japan) Kento Ito	Krush.42	Tokyo, Japan	Decision	3	3:00
Legend: Win Loss Draw/No contest Notes

== See also ==
- List of male kickboxers
