= Jorge Varela (kickboxer) =

Spanish kickboxer

- Born: July 7, 1994 (age 32); Castilleja de la Cuesta, Spain
- Native name: Jorge Varela Carmona
- Nationality: (Spain) Spanish
- Height: 1.73 m (5 ft 8 in)
- Weight: 57 kg (126 lb; 9.0 st)
- Style: Kickboxing
- Stance: Orthodox
- Fighting out of: Seville, Spain
- Team: Team Jesus Cabello

Kickboxing record
- Total: 60
- Wins: 49
- By knockout: 10
- Losses: 11
- By knockout: 4

Jorge Varela Carmona (born 7 July 1994) is a Spanish kickboxer.

As of September 2020, he was the #10 ranked Super Flyweight in the world by Combat Press.

== Kickboxing career ==
Varela faced Ramzik Ghulinyan for the WKL Intercontinental -63 kg title on the May 6, 2017 Mix Fight event. He won the fight by decision.

Varela participated in the K-1 World GP 2018 2nd Featherweight Championship Tournament, which was held on June 17, 2018. Varela faced Kaito Ozawa in the tournament quarterfinals and won the fight by a first-round knockout. Advancing to the tournament semifinals, Varela faced the former RISE Bantamweight champion Yuta Murakoshi. Murakoshi won the fight by unanimous decision, after an extra round was contested.

Varela faced Ryusei Ashizawa at K-1 World GP 2019: K’FESTA 2 on March 10, 2019. He won the fight by a first-round knockout, flooring Ashizawa with a left hook near the end of the opening round.

Varela made his third K-1 appearance against Haruma Saikyo at K-1 World GP 2019 Super Bantamweight World Tournament on June 30, 2019. He lost the fight by a third-round knockout.

Varela made his return to WLF to face Wang Junguang at Wu Lin Feng 2019: WLF -67kg World Cup 2019-2020 3rd Group Stage on August 31, 2019. Junguang won the fight by a fourth-round knockout.

Varela was booked to face Yuki Egawa at K-1 World GP 2019 Yokohamatsuri on November 24, 2019, in the quarterfinal bout of the K-1 featherweight tournament. He lost the fight by a first-round knockout.

== Titles ==
Professional

- 2017 WKL Intercontinental -63 kg Champion
- 2017 ISKA European -57 kg Champion

Amateur

- 2013 IFMA Spain Champion
- 2014 IFMA Andalucía champion

== Kickboxing record ==
Pro kickboxing record
49 wins (10 (T)KOs), 11 losses, 0 draws, 0 no contests
Date	Result	Opponent	Event	Location	Method	Round	Time
2019-11-24	Loss	(Japan) Yuki Egawa	K-1 World GP 2019 Yokohamatsuri, -57 kg Tournament Quarter Final	Yokohama, Japan	KO (left hook to the body)	1	1:49
2019-08-31	Loss	(China) Wang Junguang	Wu Lin Feng 2019: WLF -67kg World Cup 2019-2020 3rd Group Stage	Zhengzhou, China	KO (spinning back kick to the body)	4	0:55
For the Enfusion World -57kg title.
2019-06-30	Loss	(Japan) Haruma Saikyo	K-1 World GP 2019 Super Bantamweight World Tournament	Saitama, Japan	KO (knee to the head)	3	1:27
2019-03-10	Win	(Japan) Ryusei Ashizawa	K-1 World GP 2019: K'FESTA 2	Saitama, Japan	KO (left hook)	1	2:41
2019-01-19	Loss	(China) Zhao Chongyang	Wu Lin Feng 2019: WLF World Cup 2018-2019 Final	Haikou, China	Decision	3	3:00
2018-06-17	Loss	(Japan) Yuta Murakoshi	K-1 World GP 2018: 2nd Featherweight Championship Tournament, Semi Final	Saitama, Japan	Ext. R. decision (unanimous)	4	3:00
2018-06-17	Win	(Japan) Kaito Ozawa	K-1 World GP 2018 2nd Featherweight Championship Tournament, Quarter Final	Saitama, Japan	TKO (two knockdowns)	1	2:57
2018-04-07	Win	(Portugal) Helder Victor	Shocktime	Spain	Decision	3	3:00
2017-11-12	Win	(Portugal) Nelson Moreira	Kryssing World Series	Seville, Spain	Decision	3	3:00
2017-05-06	Win	(Armenia) Ramzik Ghulinyan	Mix Fight	Spain	Decision	5	3:00
Wins the WKL Intercontinental -63kg title.
2017-04-08	Win	(Portugal) Bernardo Mendes	Kryssing World Series	Spain	Decision	5	3:00
Wins the ISKA European -57kg title.
2017-03-04	Win	(Morocco) Karim Zamora	Kryssing World Series	Spain	Decision	3	3:00
2016-09-24	Draw	(Spain) Xavi Lantaron	Gran Slam V	Málaga, Spain	Decision	3	3:00
2016-05-21		(Portugal)		Portugal			
2016-03-19	Loss	(Spain) Jaime Roldán	World Fight Tour	Seville, Spain	Decision	3	3:00
2016-02-13	Loss	(England) Jordan Williams		Newcastle upon Tyne, United Kingdom	Decision	3	3:00
Legend: Win Loss Draw/no contest Notes

== See also ==
- List of male kickboxers
