= 2019 in K-1 =

Mixed martial arts events

Information
- First date: March 10, 2019
- Last date: December 28, 2019

Events
- Total events: 5

Fights
- Total fights: 99
- Title fights: 10

The year 2019 was the 26th year in the history of the K-1, a Japanese kickboxing promotion. The year started with K-1: K'Festa 2.

== List of events ==
#	Event title	Date	Arena	Location
1	K-1 World GP 2019: K'FESTA 2	March 10, 2019	Saitama Super Arena	Saitama, Japan
2	K-1 World GP 2019: Super Bantamweight World Tournament	June 30, 2019	Ryōgoku Kokugikan	Tokyo, Japan
3	K-1 World GP 2019: Japan vs World 5 vs 5 & Special Superfight in Osaka	August 24, 2019	EDION Arena Osaka	Osaka, Japan
4	K-1 World GP 2019 Yokohamatsuri	November 24, 2019	Yokohama Arena	Yokohama, Japan
5	K-1 World GP 2019 Japan: ～Women's Flyweight Championship Tournament～	December 28, 2019	Dolphin's Arena	Nagoya, Japan

== K-1 World GP 2019: K'FESTA 2 ==
K-1: K'Festa 2
- Promotion: K-1
- Date: March 10, 2019
- Venue: Saitama Super Arena
- City: Saitama, Japan
- Attendance: 16,000

K-1 World GP 2019: K'FESTA 2 was a kickboxing event held by K-1 on March 10, 2019, at the Saitama Super Arena in Saitama, Japan.

=== Background ===
The event was headlined by a catchweight, non-title fight between Takeru Segawa and Yodkitsada Yuthachonburi. The four title fights held at K'Festa two saw Yuta Murakoshi and Koya Urabe defend their titles against Hirotaka Urabe and Kenta Hayashi, respectively. Yuta Kubo defended the welterweight title against Yasuhiro Kido, and Sina Karimian made his first title defense against Hisaki Kato.

=== Fight Card ===
K'Festa 2
Weight Class				Method	Round	Time	Notes
Catchweight -59 kg	(Japan) Takeru	def.	(Thailand) Yodkitsada Yuthachonburi	KO (Punches)	3	2:43	
Super Featherweight 60 kg	(Japan) Koji	def.	(Germany) Jan Szajko	Decision (Unanimous)	3	3:00	
Catchweight 68 kg	(Brazil) Minoru Kimura	def.	(Japan) Hiromi Wajima	KO (Punches)	1	2:21	
Women 51 kg	(Japan) KANA	def.	(Sweden) Josefine Knutsson	Decision (Majority)	3	3:00	
Featherweight 57 kg	(Spain) Jorge Varela	def.	(Japan) Ryusei Ashizawa	TKO (3 Knockdowns)	1	2:41	
Welterweight 67.5 kg	(Netherlands) Jordann Pikeur	def.	(Japan) Masaaki Noiri	Decision (Majority)	3	3:00	
Super Bantamweight 55 kg	(Japan) Yoshiki Takei	def.	(Spain) Sandro Martin	TKO (Punches)	1	2:54	
Welterweight 67.5 kg	(Japan) Yuta Kubo (c)	def.	(Japan) Yasuhiro Kido	Ext.R Decision (Split)	4	3:00	Welterweight Championship Title Match
Featherweight 57 kg	(Japan) Yuta Murakoshi (c)	def.	(Japan) Hirotaka Urabe	Decision (Unanimous)	3	3:00	Featherweight Championship Title Match
Super Lightweight 65 kg	(Japan) Rukiya Anpo	def.	(Japan) Daizo Sasaki	Decision (Unanimous)	3	3:00	
Super Lightweight 65 kg	(Japan) Yasuomi Soda	def.	(Japan) Masaya Matsuhana	Decision (Unanimous)	3	3:00	
Super Featherweight 60 kg	(Japan) Kosuke Komiyama	def.	(Japan) Masanobu Goshu	Decision (Unanimous)	3	3:00	
Super Bantamweight 55 kg	(Japan) Akihiro Kaneko	def.	(Japan) Shuhei Kumura	Ext.R Decision (Unanimous)	4	3:00	
Lightweight 62.5 kg	(Japan) Kenta Hayashi	def.	(Japan) Koya Urabe (c)	Ext.R Decision (Unanimous)	4	3:00	Lightweight Championship Title Match
Cruiserweight 90 kg	(Iran) Sina Karimian (c)	def.	(France) Hisaki Kato	Decision (Unanimous)	3	3:00	Cruiserweight Championship Title Match
Lightweight 62.5 kg	(Japan) Yuto Shinohara	def.	(Japan) Fumiya Osawa	Ext.R Decision (Unanimous)	4	3:00	
Lightweight 62.5 kg	(Thailand) Gonnapar Weerasakreck	def.	(China) Liu Wei	Decision (Unanimous)	3	3:00	
Welterweight 67.5 kg	(Japan) Kaisei Kondo	def.	(Japan) Ruku	KO (Punches)	2	2:23	
Featherweight 57.5 kg	(Japan) Kaito Ozawa	def.	(Japan) Hayato	Ext.R Decision (Unanimous)	4	3:00	
Preliminary Card
Super Lightweight 65 kg	(Japan) Kota Nakano	def.	(Japan) FUMIYA	KO (Left Hook to the Body)	3	1:47	
Super Featherweight 60 kg	(Japan) Yutaka	def.	(Japan) Takuma Kawaguchi	TKO (Right Hook)	3	0:41	
Super Bantamweight 55 kg	(Japan) Riku Morisaka	def.	(Japan) Yuto Kuroda	Decision (Unanimous)	3	3:00	
Bantamweight 53 kg	(Japan) Riamu	def.	(Japan) Rira	Decision (Majority)	3	3:00	

== K-1 World GP 2019: Super Bantamweight World Tournament ==
K-1 World GP 2019: Super Bantamweight World Tournament
- Promotion: K-1
- Date: June 30, 2019
- Venue: Ryōgoku Kokugikan
- City: Tokyo, Japan
- Attendance: 10,500

K-1 World GP 2019: Super Bantamweight World Tournament was a kickboxing event held by K-1 on June 30, 2019, at the Saitama Super Arena in Saitama, Japan.

=== Background ===
During this event a Super Bantamweight Grand Prix was held, featuring the reigning champion Yoshiki Takei, Shuhei Kumura, Samvel Babayan and Masashi Kumura.

In the co-main event, Rukiya Anpo and Kaew Fairtex fought for the Super Lightweight title.

=== Fight Card ===
K'Festa 2
Weight Class				Method	Round	Time	Notes
Super Bantamweight -55 kg	(Japan) Yoshiki Takei	def.	(Japan) Masashi Kumura	KO (Right Hook & Head Kick)	2	0:38	Super Bantamweight GP Finals
Super Lightweight -65 kg	(Japan) Rukiya Anpo	def.	(Thailand) Kaew Fairtex (c)	Ext.R Decision (Unanimous)	4	3:00	Super Lightweight Title Fight
Catchweight -58.5 kg	(Japan) Yuta Murakoshi	def.	(China) Huo Xiaolong	Decision (Unanimous)	3	3:00	
Welterweight -67.5 kg	(Brazil) Minoru Kimura	def.	(Australia) Cruz Briggs	KO (Right Overhand)	1	1:37	
Super Lightweight -65 kg	(Japan) Daizo Sasaki	def.	(Japan) Fukashi	TKO (Doctor Stoppage)	3	2:14	
Featherweight -57 kg	(Japan) Haruma Saikyo	def.	(Spain) Jorge Varela	KO (Knee to the Head)	3	2:23	
Super Bantamweight -55 kg	(Japan) Yoshiki Takei	def.	(Japan) Shuhei Kumura	TKO (Punches)	1	1:46	Super Bantamweight GP Semi-finals
Super Bantamweight -55 kg	(Japan) Masashi Kumura	def.	(Armenia) Samvel Babayan	Decision (Unanimous)	3	3:00	Super Bantamweight GP Semi-finals
Super Featherweight -60 kg	(Japan) Tatsuya Oiwa	def.	(Japan) Ryusei Ashizawa	Decision (Unanimous)	3	3:00	
Super Featherweight -60 kg	(Japan) Leona Pettas	def.	(Japan) Kosuke Komiyama	KO (Left Jab)	2	2:12	
Lightweight -62.5 kg	(Japan) Fumiya Osawa	def.	(Japan) Yuzuki Satomi	Decision (Unanimous)	3	3:00	
Featherweight -57 kg	(Japan) Kaito Ozawa	def.	(Japan) Takahiro	Decision (Unanimous)	3	3:00	
Super Bantamweight -55 kg	(Japan) Shuhei Kumura	def.	(Iran) Sadegh Hashemi	TKO (Punches)	3	2:50	Super Bantamweight GP Quarter-finals
Super Bantamweight -55 kg	(Japan) Yoshiki Takei	def.	(Spain) Alex Rivas	TKO (Body Punches)	1	2:48	Super Bantamweight GP Quarter-finals
Super Bantamweight -55 kg	(Armenia) Samvel Babayan	def.	(Japan) Koki	Decision (Majority)	3	3:00	Super Bantamweight GP Quarter-finals
Super Bantamweight -55 kg	(Japan) Masashi Kumura	def.	(Thailand) Phetpangan Mor.Ratanabandit	TKO (2 Knockdowns/Punches)	1	2:38	Super Bantamweight GP Quarter-finals
Super Bantamweight -55 kg	(Japan) Yuta Hayashi	def.	(Japan) Takaya Ogura	TKO (Punches)	1	1:44	Super Bantamweight GP Reserve Fight
Preliminary Card
Super Lightweight -65 kg	(Japan) Hikaru Terashima	def.	(Japan) Jinya	KO (Front Kick)	1	1:10	
Bantamweight -53 kg	(Japan) Kazuma Takuda	def.	(Japan) Kazuki Fujita	Decision (Unanimous)	3	3:00	

== K-1 World GP 2019: Japan vs World 5 vs 5 & Special Superfight in Osaka ==
K-1 World GP 2019: Japan vs World 5 vs 5 & Special Superfight in Osaka
- Promotion: K-1
- Date: August 24, 2019
- Venue: EDION Arena Osaka
- City: Osaka, Japan
- Attendance: 7,800

K-1 World GP 2019: Japan vs World 5 vs 5 & Special Superfight in Osaka was a kickboxing event held by K-1 on August 24, 2019, at the EDION Arena Osaka in Osaka, Japan.

=== Background ===
The event was headlined by a "Comeback of the Year" match between Koji and Tatsuya Oiwa. In the co-main event Kenta Hayashi fought Deniz Demirkapu.

=== Fight Card ===
K’Festa 2
Weight Class				Method	Round	Time	Notes
Super Featherweight -60 kg	(Japan) Koji	def.	(Japan) Tatsuya Oiwa	Ext.R Decision (Split)	4	3:00	
Lightweight -62.5 kg	(Japan) Kenta Hayashi	def.	(Turkey) Deniz Demirkapu	TKO (Punches)	2	3:00	
Welterweight -67.5 kg	(Japan) Masaaki Noiri	def.	(Switzerland) Sami Lamiri	KO (Left Hook to the Body)	2	2:35	
Catchweight -68 kg	(Brazil) Minoru Kimura	def.	(Japan) Sho Oizumi	KO (Punches)	1	2:17	
Super Welterweight -70 kg	(Japan) Yasuhiro Kido	def.	(Spain) Antonio Gomez	KO (High Kick)	2	1:48	
Cruiserweight -90 kg	(Japan) Ryo Aitaka	def.	(Iran) Sina Karimian	KO (Overhand Right)	3	0:57	
Super Lightweight -65 kg	(Japan) Hideaki Yamazaki	def.	(Japan) Jin Hirayama	Decision (Unanimous)	3	3:00	
Super Lightweight -65 kg	(Japan) Tetsuya Yamato	def.	(Japan) Kensei Kondo	Decision (Unanimous)	3	3:00	
Lightweight -62.5 kg	(Japan) Yuto Shinohara	def.	(Japan) Shinichiro Kawasaki	Decision (Unanimous)	3	3:00	
Welterweight -67.5 kg	(Japan) Kaisei Kondo	def.	(Japan) Riki Matsuoka	KO (Right Cros)	1	2:18	
Super Bantamweight -55 kg	(Japan) Aoshi	def.	(Japan) Tatsuya Tsubakihara	Decision (Majority)	3	3:00	
Catchweight -52 kg	(Japan) KANA	def.	(Japan) Mahiro	Decision (Unanimous)	3	3:00	
Preliminary Card
Super Lightweight -65 kg	(Japan) Toma	def.	(Japan) Takahito Niimi	Decision (Unanimous)	3	3:00	
Bantamweight -53 kg	(Japan) Toma Kuroda	Draw.	(Japan) Aoi Noda	Decision	3	3:00	
Lightweight -62.5 kg	(Japan) SEIYA	def.	(Japan) Yuta Suzuki	Decision (Unanimous)	3	3:00	

== K-1 World GP 2019 Yokohamatsuri ==
K-1 World GP 2019 Yokohamatsuri
- Promotion: K-1
- Date: November 24, 2019
- Venue: Yokohama Arena
- City: Yokohama, Japan

K-1 World GP 2019 Yokohamatsuri was a kickboxing event held by K-1 on November 24, 2019, at the Yokohama Arena in Yokohama, Japan.

=== Background ===
A featherweight Grand Prix was held during this event, which featured Yuki Egawa, Jawsuayai Sor.Dechaphan, Haruma Saikyo, Arthur Meyer, Jorge Varela, Riku Anpo, Hirotaka Urabe and Brandon Spain.

In the co-main event, the K-1 Super Featherweight champion Takeru Segawa fought a non-title bout with Yuta Murakoshi.

=== Fight Card ===
K-1 World GP 2019 Yokohamatsuri
Weight Class				Method	Round	Time	Notes
Featherweight -57.5 kg	(Japan) Yuki Egawa	def.	(Thailand) Jawsuayai Sor.Dechaphan	KO (Left hook to the body)	1	1:00	For the K-1 Featherweight title.
Super Featherweight -60 kg	(Japan) Takeru Segawa	def.	(Japan) Yuta Murakoshi	Decision (Majority)	3	3:00	
Welterweight -67.5 kg	(Brazil) Minoru Kimura	def.	(Italy) Jordan Valdinocci	TKO (Three knockdowns)	2	1:28	
Welterweight -67.5 kg	(Netherlands) Jordann Pikeur	def.	(Japan) Kaisei Kondo	TKO (Three knockdowns)	2	2:40	
Lightweight -62.5 kg	(Japan) Kenta Hayashi	def.	(Japan) Daiki Kaneko	KO (Right straight)	2	0:35	
Super Featherweight -60 kg	(Japan) Koji Tanaka	def.	(Japan) Seiya Kawahara	TKO (Punches)	2	2:59	
Cruiserweight -90 kg	(Japan) Ryo Aitaka	def.	(South Korea) Jae Geun Yang	TKO (Shoulder injury)	1	0:57	
Featherweight -57.5 kg	(Japan) Yuki Egawa	def.	(France) Arthur Meyer	KO (Spinning back kick to the body)	1	2:50	Tournament Semifinal
Featherweight -57.5 kg	(Thailand) Jawsuayai Sor.Dechaphan	def.	(Japan) Hirotaka Urabe	Decision (Unanimous)	4	3:00	Tournament Semifinal
Super Welterweight -70 kg	(Japan) Yasuhiro Kido	def.	(Japan) Katsuya Jinbo	TKO (Punches)	2	2:29	
Super Lightweight -65 kg	(Japan) Hideaki Yamazaki	def.	(Japan) Ruku	TKO (Three knockdowns)	1	1:24	
Super Lightweight -65 kg	(Japan) Daizo Sasaki	def.	(Japan) Hayato Suzuki	Decision (Unanimous)	3	3:00	
Heavyweight	(Netherlands) Roel Mannaart	def.	(Australia) Chris Bradford	TKO (Punches)	1	2:10	For the K-1 Heavyweight title.
Feaherweight -57.5 kg	(France) Arthur Meyer	def.	(Japan) Haruma Saikyo	TKO (Shin injury)	2	1:59	Tournament Quarterfinal
Feaherweight -57.5 kg	(Japan) Yuki Egawa	def.	(Spain) Jorge Varela	TKO (Left hook to the body)	1	1:41	Tournament Quarterfinal
Feaherweight -57.5 kg	(Thailand) Jawsuayai Sor.Dechaphan	def.	(Japan) Riku Anpo	TKO (Flying knee and left hook)	1	1:18	Tournament Quarterfinal
Feaherweight -57.5 kg	(Japan) Hirotaka Urabe	def.	(Australia) Brandon Spain	Decision (Unanimous)	3	3:00	Tournament Quarterfinal
Feaherweight -57.5 kg	(Japan) Toma	def.	(Japan) Tetsu	Decision (Unanimous)	3	3:00	
Preliminary Card
Super Bantamweight -55 kg	(Japan) Shota Oiwa	draw.	(Japan) Ryuto	Draw (Majority)	3	3:00	
Super Featherweight -60 kg	(Japan) Junpei Sano	def.	(Japan) Kazuma Kubo	Draw (Majority)	3	3:00	
Feaherweight -57.5 kg	(Japan) Kazuma Takuda	def.	(Japan) Kaito Yamawaki	KO (Left head kick)	1	1:10	
Feaherweight -57.5 kg	(Japan) Keito Okajima	def.	(Japan) Rikiya Yamaura	Decision (Unanimous)	3	3:00	
Welterweight -70 kg	(Japan) EITO	def.	(Japan) Kentaro Ishibashi	TKO (Three knockdowns)	1	2:56	

== K-1 World GP 2019 Japan: ～Women's Flyweight Championship Tournament～ ==
K-1 World GP 2019 Japan: ～Women's Flyweight Championship Tournament～
- Promotion: K-1
- Date: December 28, 2019
- Venue: Aichi Prefectural Gymnasium
- City: Nagoya, Aichi, Japan

K-1 World GP 2019 Japan: ～Women's Flyweight Championship Tournament～ was a kickboxing event held by K-1 on December 28, 2019, at the Aichi Prefectural Gymnasium in Nagoya, Japan.

=== Background ===
The event was headlined by a Super Lightweight title rematch between the reigning champion Rukiya Anpo and Kaew Fairtex. The event also featured a Women's Flyweight Grand Prix, to crown the new K-1 champion, which included the reigning Krush champion Kana Morimoto, the former Krush title challenger Josefine Lindgren Knutsson, former Krush champion Mellony Geugjes, as well as the Enfusion and ISKA champion Cristina Morales.

The reigning Super Bantamweight champion Yoshiki Takei fought a non-title bout against Suriyanlek OBT.Kamphee, while the Featherweight champion Yuki Egawa met the Super Featherweight champion Takeru Segawa in an exhibition match.

=== Fight Card ===
K-1 World GP 2019 Japan: ～Women's Flyweight Championship Tournament～
Weight Class				Method	Round	Time	Notes
Super Lightweight -65 kg	(Japan) Rukiya Anpo	def.	(Thailand) Kaew Fairtex	Decision (Unanimous)	3	3:00	For the K-1 Super Lightweight title.
Women's Flyweight -52 kg	(Japan) Kana Morimoto	def.	(Sweden) Josefine Lindgren Knutsson	Decision (Split)	4	3:00	For the K-1 Women's Flyweight title.
Super Bantamweight -55 kg	(Japan) Yoshiki Takei	def.	(Thailand) Suriyanlek OBT.Kamphee	Decision (Unanimous)	3	3:00	
Super Welterweight -70 kg	(Brazil) Minoru Kimura	def.	(Nigeria) Marcel Adeyemi	TKO (Punches)	1	1:18	
Welterweight -67.5 kg	(Japan) Masaaki Noiri	def.	(Turkey) Hasan Toy	Decision (Unanimous)	3	3:00	
Super Featherweight -60 kg	(Japan) Tatsuya Oiwa	def.	(Greece) Stavros Exakoustidis	Decision (Unanimous)	3	3:00	
Super Featherweight -60 kg	(Japan) Takeru Segawa	draw.	(Japan) Yuki Egawa	Draw	1	3:00	Exhibition bout
Super Lightweight -65 kg	(Japan) Fukashi Mizutani	def.	(Japan) Tetsuya Yamato	TKO (Punches)	3	0:34	
Cruiserweight -90 kg	(Japan) Hisaki Kato	def.	(Japan) K-Jee	TKO (Three knockdowns)	2	1:17	
Welterweight -67.5 kg	(Japan) Kaito	def.	(South Korea) Ho Sung Kim	TKO (Punches)	1	2:21	
Women's Flyweight -52 kg	(Sweden) Josefine Lindgren Knutsson	def.	(Netherlands) Mellony Geugjes	Decision (Unanimous)	3	3:00	Tournament Semifinal
Women's Flyweight -52 kg	(Japan) Kana Morimoto	def.	(Spain) Cristina Morales	Decision (Unanimous)	3	3:00	Tournament Semifinal
Women's Flyweight -52 kg	(Japan) Kotomi	def.	(Japan) Mahiro	Decision (Unanimous)	3	3:00	
Preliminary Card
Super Bantamweight -55 kg	(Japan) Hinata Matsumoto	def.	(Japan) Mao Hashimoto	Decision (Unanimous)	4	3:00	
Super Lightweight -65 kg	(Japan) Shodai Matsuoka	def.	(Japan) Taito	KO (Spinning back kick to the head)	1	1:25	
Featherweight -57.5 kg	(Japan) Takahito Niimi	def.	(Japan) Naoki Takahashi	Decision (Unanimous)	3	3:00	
Featherweight -57.5 kg	(Japan) Masafumi Kurasaki	def.	(Japan) Hideki	Decision (Unanimous)	3	3:00	
Super Featherweight -60 kg	(Japan) Kazuki Sagegami	def.	(Japan) Yuto Saito	KO (Right hook)	2	2:02	
Super Bantamweight -55 kg	(Japan) Koji Ikeda	def.	(Japan) Yuki Toyoda	KO (Right hook)	3	3:00	

== See also ==
- 2019 in Glory
- 2019 in Kunlun Fight
- 2019 in ONE Championship
- 2019 in Romanian kickboxing
- 2019 in Wu Lin Feng
