= Tatsuya Oiwa =

Japanese kickboxer (born 1992)

- Born: 大岩龍矢; 29 January 1992 (age 34); Nagoya, Japan
- Height: 1.68 m (5 ft 6 in)
- Weight: 60 kg (130 lb; 9.4 st)
- Division: Bantamweight
- Style: Kickboxing
- Fighting out of: Sagamihara, Japan
- Team: Vasileus Gym (2025 - Present); K-1 Gym Sagami-Ono KREST (2016 - 2025); Team Dragon (2015 - 2016)
- Years active: 2015 - present

Kickboxing record
- Total: 41
- Wins: 28
- By knockout: 10
- Losses: 13
- By knockout: 1

Other information
- Website: https://tatsuya-oiwa.com/

Tatsuya Oiwa (Japanese: 大岩龍矢, Oiwa Tatsuya; born January 29, 1992) is a Japanese kickboxer. He is a former Krush Lightweight Champion.

He was ranked as a top ten bantamweight by Combat Press between August 2020 and April 2022.

== Kickboxing career ==
Oiwa made his Krush debut during Krush 49, with a unanimous decision win over Masafumi Kurasaki. He alternated wins and losses over his next six fights, defeating Yuzo Suzuki, Masafumi Kurasaki and Hikaru Fujihashi, but losing to Yuta Otaki, Hirotaka Asahisa and Kaito Ozawa.

Tatsuya then went on a three fight winning streak, winning a unanimous decision against Kento Ito, a split decision against Ryusei Ashizawa and a TKO win over Kazuki Koyano. The winning streak was snapped by Taio Asahisa, who won a unanimous decision during Krush 82.

Oiwa bounced back by winning his next four fights, a unanimous decision against Toshio, a majority decision against Takumi Yokoyama, a knockout win over Yutaka and a TKO win over Masahiro Yamamoto.

Oiwa challenged for a major title for the first time in his career during Krush 96, when he fought the reigning Krush Super Featherweight champion Kotaro Shimano. Shimano won the fight by unanimous decision.

After his failed title bid, Oiwa won his next two fights. He first defeated Kyohei Hayashi by a first-round KO, and won the rematch with Ryusei Ashizawa by unanimous decision. Tatsuya then fought Koji during K-1 World GP 2019: Japan vs World 5 vs 5, and lost the fight by split decision, after an extra round was fought. Oiwa won his next fight against Stavros Exakoustidis by unanimous decision.

He fought for the Krush Super Featherweight title for the second time in his career during Krush 115, when he challenged the incumbent champion Leona Pettas. Pettas won the fight by unanimous decision.

Oiwa was scheduled to fight Hirotaka Asahisa during the K-1 World GP 2020 in Fukuoka. He lost the fight by unanimous decision. He was next scheduled to fight Naoki Yamamoto at Krush 123. He won the fight by a third-round knockout.

Oiwa was scheduled to fight the former K-1 Featherweight champion Yuki Egawa at K-1 World GP 2021 in Fukuoka. Egawa later withdrew from due bout due to COVID-19 protocols. The pair was rescheduled to face each other at K-1: K'Festa 5 on April 3, 2022. Oiwa won the fight by unanimous decision, with scores of 30–29, 30–29 and 30–28.

Oiwa faced Adam Bouarourou in the quarterfinals of the 2022 K-1 Super Featherweight World Grand Prix. He won the fight by unanimous decision. Oiwa advanced to the tournament semifinals, where faced Leona Pettas, in a rematch of their June 28, 2020, bout, which Oiwa lost by decision. Oiwa once again came up short, as Pettas won the fight by a third-round knockout.

Oiwa wax expected to face Kaito Ozawa at K-1 World GP 2023: K'Festa 6 on March 12, 2023. Ozawa withdrew from the fight on March 8, due to a bone contusion of a metacarpal bone, and was replaced by Yuta Kuneida. He won the fight by a second-round knockout.

Oiwa faced Tomoya Yokoyama at K-1 World GP 2023 in Yokohama on June 3, 2023. He lost the fight, which saw both fighters get knocked down, by unanimous decision.

Oiwa faced Yuto Shinohara, in his first fight at the lightweight (-62.5 kg) limit, at K-1 ReBIRTH 2 on December 9, 2023. He won the fight by a first-round knockout.

== Titles and accomplishments ==
- BigBang
  - 2021 Bigbang Lightweight Champion
- Krush
  - 2024 Krush Lightweight (-62.5kg) Champion
    - One successful title defense

== Fight record ==
Professional Kickboxing Record
28 Wins (10 (T)KO's), 13 Losses, 0 Draw, 0 No Contest
Date	Result	Opponent	Event	Location	Method	Round	Time
2026-10-31	Loss	(Japan) Kenshin Kodama	Krush 193	Tokyo, Japan	Decision (Unanimous)	3	3:00
Loses the Krush Lightweight (-62.5kg) title.
2026-05-31	Loss	(Japan) Kiyomitsu Samuel Nagasawa	K-1 Revenge	Tokyo, Japan	Decision (Unanimous)	3	3:00
2025-11-29	Win	(Japan) Yuto Shinohara	Krush 182	Tokyo, Japan	Decision (Unanimous)	3	3:00
Defends the Krush Lightweight (-62.5kg) title.
2025-07-13	Win	(Japan) Ryuya Nishimoto	K-1 Dontaku	Fukuoka, Japan	KO (Left hook)	3	0:50
2024-11-23	Loss	(Argentina) Tomás Aguirre	Krush 168	Nagoya, Japan	Ext.R Decision (Unanimous)	4	3:00
2024-07-27	Win	(Japan) Kento Ito	Krush 163	Tokyo, Japan	Decision (Unanimous)	3	3:00
Wins the Krush Lightweight (-62.5kg) title.
2024-02-24	Win	(Japan) Hiroki	Krush 158	Tokyo, Japan	Decision (Unanimous)	3	3:00
2023-12-09	Win	(Japan) Yuto Shinohara	K-1 ReBIRTH 2	Osaka, Japan	KO (Right cross)	1	2:38
2023-06-03	Loss	(Japan) Tomoya Yokoyama	K-1 World GP 2023: inaugural Middleweight Championship Tournament	Yokohama, Japan	Decision (Majority)	3	3:00
2023-03-12	Win	(Japan) Yuta Kunieda	K-1 World GP 2023: K'Festa 6	Tokyo, Japan	KO (Right overhand)	2	1:37
2022-09-11	Loss	(Japan) Leona Pettas	K-1 World GP 2022 Yokohamatsuri, Tournament Semifinals	Yokohama, Japan	KO (Flying knee)	3	0:12
2022-09-11	Win	(Morocco) Adam Bouarourou	K-1 World GP 2022 Yokohamatsuri, Tournament Quarterfinals	Yokohama, Japan	Decision (Unanimous)	3	3:00
2022-04-03	Win	(Japan) Yuki Egawa	K-1: K'Festa 5	Tokyo, Japan	Decision (Unanimous)	3	3:00
2021-11-14	Win	(Japan) Takuma	Super Bigbang 2021	Yokohama, Japan	Decision (Unanimous)	3	3:00
Wins the Bigbang Lightweight title.
2021-03-27	Win	(Japan) Naoki Yamamoto	Krush 123	Tokyo, Japan	KO (Right Hook)	3	
2020-11-03	Loss	(Japan) Hirotaka Asahisa	K-1 World GP 2020 in Fukuoka	Fukuoka, Japan	Decision (Unanimous)	3	3:00
2020-07-21	Loss	(Japan) Leona Pettas	Krush 115	Tokyo, Japan	Decision (Unanimous)	3	3:00
For the Krush Super Featherweight (-60kg) title.
2019-12-28	Win	(Greece) Stavros Exakoustidis	K-1 World GP 2019 Japan: ～Women's Flyweight Championship Tournament～	Nagoya, Japan	Decision (Unanimous)	3	3:00
2019-08-24	Loss	(Japan) Koji	K-1 World GP 2019: Japan vs World 5 vs 5	Osaka, Japan	Ext.R Decision (Split)	4	3:00
2019-06-30	Win	(Japan) Ryusei Ashizawa	K-1 World GP 2019: Super Bantamweight World Tournament	Tokyo, Japan	Decision (Unanimous)	3	3:00
2019-03-30	Win	(Japan) Kyohei Hayashi	Krush 99	Tokyo, Japan	KO (Right straight)	1	1:03
2018-12-16	Loss	(Japan) Kotaro Shimano	Krush 96	Tokyo, Japan	Decision (Unanimous)	3	3:00
For the Krush Super Featherweight title.
2018-08-18	Win	(Japan) Masahiro Yamamoto	Krush 92	Nagoya, Japan	TKO (Three knockdowns)	2	2:58
2018-05-17	Win	(Japan) Yutaka	Krush 88	Tokyo, Japan	KO (Right Hook)	3	0:35
2018-03-21	Win	(Japan) Takumi Yokoyama	K-1 World GP 2018: K'FESTA.1	Saitama, Japan	Decision (Majority)	3	3:00
2018-01-27	Win	(Japan) Toshio	Krush 84	Tokyo, Japan	Decision (Unanimous)	3	3:00
2017-11-05	Loss	(Japan) Taio Asahisa	Krush 82	Tokyo, Japan	Decision (Unanimous)	3	3:00
2017-08-20	Win	(Japan) Kazuki Koyano	Krush 79	Nagoya, Japan	TKO (Cut to the eyebrow)	1	2:40
2017-05-28	Win	(Japan) Ryusei Ashizawa	Krush 76	Tokyo, Japan	Decision (Split)	3	3:00
2016-12-18	Win	(Japan) Kento Ito	Krush 71	Tokyo, Japan	Decision (Unanimous)	3	3:00
2016-08-20	Loss	(Japan) Kaito Ozawa	Krush 68	Tokyo, Japan	Decision (Split)	3	3:00
2016-04-10	Win	(Japan) Hikaru Fujihashi	Krush 65	Tokyo, Japan	TKO (Punches)	3	2:33
2016-01-17	Loss	(Japan) Hirotaka Asahisa	Krush 62	Tokyo, Japan	Decision (Unanimous)	3	3:00
2015-08-22	Win	(Japan) Masafumi Kurasaki	Krush 57	Nagoya, Japan	Decision (Unanimous)	3	3:00
2015-06-12	Loss	(Japan) Yuta Otaki	Krush 55	Tokyo, Japan	Decision (Unanimous)	3	3:00
2015-04-12	Win	(Japan) Yuzo Suzuki	Krush 53	Tokyo, Japan	KO (Knee to the body)	2	1:47
2015-01-04	Win	(Japan) Masafumi Kurasaki	Krush 49	Tokyo, Japan	Decision (Majority)	3	3:00
Legend: Win Loss Draw/No contest Notes

== See also ==
- List of male kickboxers
