= Yuta Murakoshi =

Japanese kickboxer

Murakoshi Yuta
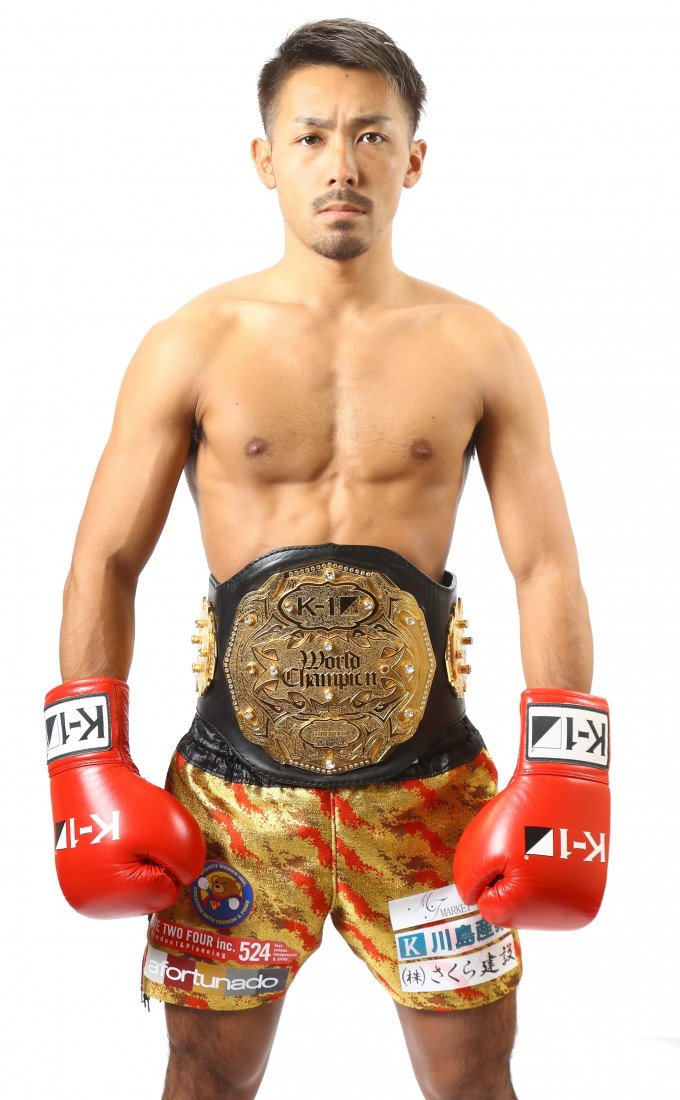
- Born: 村越 優汰; September 10, 1994 (age 32); Hiratsuka, Kanagawa Prefecture, Japan
- Height: 170 cm (5 ft 7 in)
- Weight: 60 kg (130 lb; 9.4 st)
- Division: Flyweight
- Style: Kickboxing
- Stance: Southpaw
- Fighting out of: Fujisawa, Kanagawa, Japan
- Team: Shonan Fighting Club
- Years active: 2011 - present

Kickboxing record
- Total: 44
- Wins: 33
- By knockout: 11
- Losses: 11
- By knockout: 4

Yuta Murakoshi is a Japanese kickboxer, fighting out of Tokyo, Japan. He is the former K-1 Featherweight and RISE Bantamweight champion.

As of November 2021, he is the #5 ranked bantamweight in the world according to Combat Press. He was ranked in the strawweight top ten by Combat Press between May 2019 and February 2020, and in the bantamweight top ten between July 2018 and November 2018.

== Kickboxing career ==
=== RISE ===
Murakoshi made his professional debut in April 2011, against Singdam M16muaythaistyle as part of the 2011 Rising Rookies Cup. He lost the fight by KO in the third round.

After this loss, Murakoshi went on a five fight winning streak, scoring KO wins over Yunbo, Yuji and Hironori Okama, as well as decision wins over Hirofumi Kamata and Daihachi Furuoka.

His winning streak was snapped by an extra round split decision loss to Seiya Rokugawa during RISE 91.

After this loss, Murakoshi once again went on a five fight winning streak. He scored decision wins over Hikaru Fujihashi and Tomoya Aoki, and KO wins over Tomo Arimatsu, Kazuki Tanaka and Shuto Miyazaki.

Murakoshi's five fight winning streak earned him a chance to challenge Hiroki Maeda for the RISE Bantamweight title. Murakoshi won the fight by unanimous decision.

After winning the RISE Bantamweight title, Murakoshi fought three non-title bouts. During RISE 101, he defeated Takashi Oono by unanimous decision. During RISE 102, he defeated Nakalek Kaew.Kanraya by a second round KO. During RISE 104, he defeated So Jeon Hu by a second round KO.

Murakoshi was scheduled to defend his RISE Bantamweight title for the first time against the sixteen year old Tenshin Nasukawa. Nasukawa won the fight by TKO, midway through the second round.

=== BLADE FC ===
Yuta Murakoshi took part in the 2015 BLADE FC 55 kg tournament. In the quarterfinals, Murakoshi faced Yu Wor.Wanchai, and won the bout by unanimous decision. In the semifinals he fought Taiki Naito, but would in turn lose a unanimous decision.

=== Return to RISE ===
Returning to RISE, Murakoshi went on a three fight winning streak. He won a split decision against Itto, and scored (T)KO wins over Tomo Arimatsu and Eisaku Ogasawara.

Murakoshi fought a rematch with Tenshin Nasukawa for the RISE Bantamweight title in September 2016. Nasukawa won the fight by majority decision.

After his failed title bid, Murakoshi won his next four fights. He first won a unanimous decision against Norihisa Isencho during J-NETWORK 20th Anniversary～2nd. He then won a majority decision against Masahide Kudo during RISE 118. Afterwards, Murakoshi fought Shunta during Big Bang's ISEHARA event, and won the fight by unanimous decision. The last win of this four fight winning streak came against Ryusei Ashizawa, whom he defeated by majority decision.

=== K-1 ===
Murakoshi fought Haruma Saikyo for the Krush Featherweight title, during Krush 86. Saikyo successfully defended his title by an extra round decision.

Yuta Murakoshi participated in the 2018 K-1 Featherweight World Grand Prix. He defeated Elias Mahmoudi by an extra round split decision in the quarterfinals. He again went into an extra round against Jorge Varela in the semifinals, after which Murakoshi won a unanimous decision. In the tournament finals, he fought a rematch with Haruma Saikyo, whom he defeated by TKO, after Saikyo suffered an ankle injury in the first round.

After winning the K-1 Featherweight title, Murakoshi lost a decision to Alex Rivas, in November 2018.

He was scheduled to defend his K-1 Featherweight title against Hirotaka Urabe at K'Festa 2. Murakoshi won the fight by unanimous decision.

In his next two fights, Murakoshi won a unanimous decision against Huo Xiaolong, and lost a majority decision to Takeru Segawa. In December 2020, he won a unanimous decision against Naoki Yamamoto. Murakoshi fought Ryusei Ashizawa at the K-1: K'Festa 4 Day 1 event, and won the fight by unanimous decision.

Murakoshi faced Narufumi Nishimoto at K-1 World GP 2021: Yokohamatsuri on September 20, 2021. He won the fight by unanimous decision.

Murakoshi was scheduled to face Hirotaka Asahisa at K-1: K'Festa 5 on April 3, 2022. He lost the fight by knockout in the first round.

Murakoshi returned to professional competition following a two-year absence from the sport to face the former Krush Super Featherweight (-60 kg) champion Chihiro Nakajima at K-1 World MAX 2024 on September 29, 2024. He lost the fight by unanimous decision, with scores of 30–28, 30–28 and 30–27.

Murakoshi faced Yuto Saito at K-1 Beyond on May 31, 2025. He won the fight by split decision, after an extra fourth round was contested.

== Titles and accomplishments ==
=== Kickboxing ===
- RISE
  - 2012 RISE Rookies Cup Bantamweight winner
  - 2014 RISE Bantamweight Champion
- K-1
  - 2018 K-1 Featherweight (-57.5kg) Champion
    - One successful title defense

=== Karate ===
- 2006 Byakuren Kaikan All Japan Jr Championship U-12 runner-up

== Fight record ==
Professional Kickboxing Record
33 wins (11 (T)KO's), 11 losses, 0 draw, 0 no contest
Date	Result	Opponent	Event	Location	Method	Round	Time
2026-09-12	Win	(Japan) Kenta Hayashi	K-1 World MAX 2026 - World Tournament Opening Round	Tokyo, Japan	Decision (Unanimous)	3	3:00
2025-05-31	Win	(Japan) Yuto Saito	K-1 Beyond	Yokohama, Japan	Ext.R Decision (Split)	4	3:00
2024-09-29	Loss	(Japan) Chihiro Nakajima	K-1 World MAX 2024	Tokyo, Japan	Decision (Unanimous)	3	3:00
2022-04-03	Loss	(Japan) Hirotaka Asahisa	K-1: K'Festa 5	Tokyo, Japan	KO (Jumping knee)	1	1:42
2021-09-20	Win	(Japan) Narufumi Nishimoto	K-1 World GP 2021: Yokohamatsuri	Yokohama, Japan	Decision (Unanimous)	3	3:00
2021-03-21	Win	(Japan) Ryusei Ashizawa	K-1: K'Festa 4 Day 1	Tokyo, Japan	Decision (Unanimous)	3	3:00
2020-12-13	Win	(Japan) Naoki Yamamoto	K-1 World GP 2020 Winter's Crucial Bout	Tokyo, Japan	Decision (Unanimous)	3	3:00
2020-03-22	Loss	(Japan) Leona Pettas	K-1: K’Festa 3	Saitama, Japan	TKO (Punches)	3	2:33
2019-11-24	Loss	(Japan) Takeru	K-1 World GP 2019 Yokohamatsuri	Yokohama, Japan	Decision (Majority)	3	3:00
2019-06-30	Win	(China) Huo Xiaolong	K-1 World GP 2019: Super Bantamweight World Tournament	Saitama, Japan	Decision (Unanimous)	3	3:00
2019-03-10	Win	(Japan) Hirotaka Urabe	K-1 World GP 2019: K’FESTA 2	Saitama, Japan	Decision (Unanimous)	3	3:00
Defends the K-1 Featherweight (-57.5kg) title.
2018-11-03	Loss	(Spain) Alex Rivas	K-1 World GP 2018: 3rd Super Lightweight Championship Tournament	Saitama, Japan	Decision (Unanimous)	3	3:00
2018-06-17	Win	(Japan) Haruma Saikyo	K-1 World GP 2018: 2nd Featherweight Championship Tournament, Final	Tokyo, Japan	TKO (ankle injury)	1	0:51
Wins the 2018 K-1 World GP Featherweight tournament and the vacant K-1 Featherweight (-57.5kg) title.
2018-06-17	Win	(Spain) Jorge Varela	K-1 World GP 2018: 2nd Featherweight Championship Tournament, Semi Final	Tokyo, Japan	Ext.R Decision (Unanimous)	4	3:00
2018-06-17	Win	(Algeria) Elias Mahmoudi	K-1 World GP 2018: 2nd Featherweight Championship Tournament, Quarter Final	Tokyo, Japan	Ext.R Decision (Split)	4	3:00
2018-03-10	Loss	(Japan) Haruma Saikyo	Krush.86	Tokyo, Japan	Decision (Split)	3	3:00
For the Krush Featherweight title.
2017-12-27	Win	(Japan) Ryusei Ashizawa	K-1 World GP 2017 Japan Survival Wars 2017	Tokyo, Japan	Decision (Majority)	3	3:00
2017-10-08	Win	(Japan) Shunta	Big Bang ISEHARA	Kanagawa, Japan	Decision (Unanimous)	3	3:00
2017-07-17	Win	(Japan) Masahide Kudo	RISE118	Tokyo, Japan	Decision (Majority)	3	3:00
2017-02-25	Win	(Japan) Norihisa Isencho	J-KICK 2017～J-NETWORK 20th Anniversary～2nd	Tokyo, Japan	Decision (Unanimous)	3	3:00
2016-09-25	Loss	(Japan) Tenshin Nasukawa	RISE 113	Tokyo, Japan	Decision (Majority)	5	3:00
For the RISE Bantamweight title.
2016-07-30	Win	(Japan) Eisaku Ogasawara	RISE 112	Tokyo, Japan	TKO (Corner Stoppage)	3	1:53
2016-03-26	Win	(Japan) Tomo Arimatsu	RISE 110	Tokyo, Japan	KO (Liver Kick)	3	1:37
2015-11-08	Win	(Japan) Itto	RISE 108	Tokyo, Japan	Ext.R Decision (Split)	4	3:00
2015-08-01	Loss	(Japan) Taiki Naito	BLADE Fighting Championship 2 - JAPAN CUP -55 kg, Semi Finals	Tokyo, Japan	Decision (Unanimous)	3	3:00
2015-08-01	Win	(Japan) Yu Wor.Wanchai	BLADE Fighting Championship 2 - JAPAN CUP -55 kg, Quarter Finals	Tokyo, Japan	Decision (Unanimous)	3	3:00
2015-09-31	Loss	(Japan) Tenshin Nasukawa	RISE 105	Tokyo, Japan	TKO (Punches)	2	1:31
Loses the RISE Bantamweight title.
2015-03-21	Win	(Korea) So Jeon Hu	RISE 104	Tokyo, Japan	KO (Left Knee to the Body)	2	1:46
2014-11-06	Win	(Thailand) Nakalek Kaew.Kanraya	RISE 102	Tokyo, Japan	KO (Left Hook)	2	0:32
2014-09-28	Win	(Japan) Takashi Oono	RISE 101	Tokyo, Japan	Decision (Unanimous)	3	3:00
2014-07-12	Win	(Japan) Hiroki Maeda	RISE 100～BLADE 0～	Tokyo, Japan	Decision (Unanimous)	5	3:00
Wins the RISE Bantamweight title.
2014-03-30	Win	(Japan) Shuto Miyazaki	RISE 98	Tokyo, Japan	Ext.R KO (Right Knee)	4	0:23
2013-11-04	Win	(Japan) Kazuki Tanaka	RISE 96	Tokyo, Japan	KO (Front Kick)	2	1:00
2013-09-13	Win	(Japan) Tomo Arimatsu	RISE 95	Tokyo, Japan	KO (Knee)	2	1:10
2013-07-20	Win	(Japan) Tomoya Aoki	RISE 94	Tokyo, Japan	Decision (Unanimous)	3	3:00
2013-06-09	Win	(Japan) Hikaru Fujihashi	RISE 93	Tokyo, Japan	Decision (Unanimous)	3	3:00
2013-01-06	Loss	(Japan) Seiya Rokugawa	RISE 91/M-1MC ～INFINITY.II～	Tokyo, Japan	Ext.R Decision (Split)	4	3:00
2012-10-25	Win	(Japan) Daihachi Furuoka	RISE 90	Tokyo, Japan	Decision (Unanimous)	3	3:00
2012-06-17	Win	(Japan) Hironori Okama	J-NETWORK J-KICK 2012～NEXT J-GENERATION～3rd	Tokyo, Japan	KO	2	2:26
2012-03-11	Win	(Japan) Yuji	RISE ZERO	Tokyo, Japan	KO (Right Hook)	2	0:35
2011-12-18	Win	(Japan) Hirofumi Kamata	RISE ZERO	Tokyo, Japan	Decision (Unanimous)	3	3:00
2011-09-23	Win	(Japan) Yunbo	RISE 82	Tokyo, Japan	KO	1	2:08
2011-04-24	Loss	(Japan) Singdam M16muaythaistyle	RISE 77 - Rising Rookies Cup	Tokyo, Japan	KO (Punches)	3	2:53
Legend: Win Loss Draw/No contest Notes

Amateur Kickboxing Record
Date	Result	Opponent	Event	Location	Method	Round	Time
2010-10-31	Loss	(Japan) Shogo Kondo	KAMINARIMON All Japan Tournament, Quarter Final	Tokyo, Japan	Decision (Unanimous)	1	2:00
2010-08-25	Loss	(Japan) Nobuto Ikeda	K-1 Koshien East Japan Selection Tournament, 1/8 Final	Tokyo, Japan	Ext.R Decision	2	2:00
2010-08-25	Win	(Japan) Haruki Nihei	K-1 Koshien East Japan Selection Tournament, First Round	Tokyo, Japan	Ext.R Decision	2	2:00
2009-10-25	Loss	(Japan) Shogo Kondo	KAMINARIMON Championship Selection Tournament, Semi Final	Tokyo, Japan	Decision (Majority)	1	2:00
2009-10-25	Win	(Japan) Kouki Hosogai	KAMINARIMON Championship Tournament, Quarter Final	Tokyo, Japan	Decision (Unanimous)	1	2:00
2009-08-23	Win	(Japan) Tokio Yachuda	KAMINARIMON	Tokyo, Japan	Decision (Majority)	2	1:30
Legend: Win Loss Draw/No contest Notes

== See also ==
- List of male kickboxers
- List of K-1 champions
