= Ryusei Ashizawa =

Japanese male kickboxer

- Born: 芦澤 竜誠; 1 May 1995 (age 31); Minami-Alps, Yamanashi, Japan
- Height: 1.75 m (5 ft 9 in)
- Weight: 60 kg (130 lb; 9.4 st)
- Division: Bantamweight
- Style: Kickboxing
- Fighting out of: Tokyo, Japan
- Team: DRAGON FISH (2021-Present); PURGE TOKYO (2019-2021); K-1 GYM Team Pegasus (2016-2019); Taiken Gym (2012-2016)
- Years active: 2012 - present

Kickboxing record
- Total: 39
- Wins: 25
- By knockout: 15
- Losses: 13
- By knockout: 5
- Draws: 1

Mixed martial arts record
- Total: 7
- Wins: 2
- By knockout: 1
- By decision: 1
- Losses: 5
- By knockout: 3
- By submission: 1
- By decision: 1

Ryusei Ashizawa (born May 5, 1995) is a Japanese kickboxer and mixed martial artist currently competing in a Bantamweight divisions of Rizin Fighting Federation.

Between April and July 2022, he was ranked the tenth best bantamweight in the world by Combat Press.

== Kickboxing career ==
Ashizawa made his professional debut on December 9, 2012, at MAJKF BREAK－32 ～SEIZE～. He defeated Tetsuro Noguchi by unanimous decision to take the MAJKF Japan rookie tournament title.

On November 11, 2013, Ashizawa faced Kenshiro Aoi in Japan Kickboxing Innovation. He won the fight by technical knockout in the second round to earn a shot at the reigning REBELS champion Hikaru Machida. They faced each other on December 23 at Japan Kickboxing Innovation "champion carnival". He lost the fight by technical knockout in the fourth round.

On August 31, 2014, Ashizawa challenged Kyohei for the Innovation Super Featherweight title. He lost the fight by unanimous decision.

On December 12, 2015, Ashizawa faced Sota Ichinohe at Japan Kickboxing Innovation Champion's Carnival 2015. He lost the fight by unanimous decision after five rounds.

On April 29, 2016, Ashizawa faced Atom Yamada for the vacant Innovation Featherweight title at Japan Kickboxing Innovation "Dream Force-11". He won the fight by technical knockout in the second round with punches and captured the vacant belt.

On April 16, 2017, Ashizawa faced Kazuki Koyano at REBELS 50. He won the fight by knockout in the third round with punches.

On May 28, 2017, Ashizawa lost to Tatsuya Oiwa by split decision at Krush 76.

On December 27, 2017, Ashizawa faced Yuta Murakoshi at K-1 World GP 2017 Japan Survival Wars 2017. He lost the fight by majority decision.

On June 17, 2018, Ashizawa entered an 8-man one night tournament for the vacant K-1 featherweight title at K-1 World GP 2018: 2nd Featherweight Championship Tournament. In Quarter-finals he defeated Silviu Vitez by knockout in the first round. In the semi-finals he lost Haruma Saikyo by unanimous decision.

Ashizawa faced Jorge Varela at K-1 World GP 2019: K’FESTA 2 on March 10, 2019. He lost the fight by first-round knockout, Ashizawa was floored with a left hook near the end of the opening round.

Ashizawa was scheduled to face Kotaro Shimano at K-1 World GP 2020 in Tokyo. Ashizawa won the bout by TKO in the second round after a back and forth fight in which both Ashizawa and Shimano were knocked down.

Ashizawa fought Yuta Murakoshi at the K-1: K'Festa 4 Day 1 event, and lost the fight by unanimous decision.

Ashizawa was scheduled to face Hirotaka Urabe at K-1 World GP 2021: Yokohamatsuri on September 20, 2021. He won the fight by unanimous decision.

Ashizawa faced YA-MAN at THE MATCH 2022 on June 19, 2022, in an open finger glove match. He lost the fight by a first-round knockout, after suffering several knockdowns.

On April 1, 2023, Ashizawa defeated Kouzi at Rizin 41 – Osaka via split decision.

Making his MMA debut, Ashizawa faced Shinobu Ota on December 31, 2023, at Rizin 45, getting knocked out in the first round.

== Titles and accomplishments ==
- Martial Arts Japan Kickboxing Federation
  - 2012 MAJKF Rookie Tournament Featherweight winner
- Japan Kickboxing Innovation
  - 2016 Innovation Featherweight Champion

== Mixed martial arts record ==
Professional record breakdown
7 matches	2 wins	5 losses
By knockout	1	3
By submission	0	1
By decision	1	1

Res.	Record	Opponent	Method	Event	Date	Round	Time	Location	Notes
Loss	2–5	Seiya Inoue	TKO (punches)	Rizin Landmark 16	October 3, 2026	1	4:56	Nagasaki, Japan	
Loss	2–4	Ryoma Shishimoto	Submission (armbar)	Rizin: Shiwasu no Cho Tsuwamono Matsuri	December 31, 2025	1	0:25	Saitama, Japan	
Loss	2–3	Genji Umeno	Decision (unanimous)	Rizin 51	September 28, 2025	3	5:00	Nagoya, Japan	
Loss	2–2	Ryuya Fukuda	KO (punches)	Rizin 49	December 31, 2024	1	0:54	Saitama, Japan	
Win	2–1	Shoji Maruyama	KO (knee to the body)	Rizin Landmark 10	November 17, 2024	2	1:05	Nagoya, Japan	
Win	1–1	Kouzi	Decision (unanimous)	Super Rizin 3	July 28, 2024	3	5:00	Saitama, Japan	
Loss	0–1	Shinobu Ota	KO (punches)	Rizin 45	December 31, 2023	1	2:21	Saitama, Japan	Bantamweight debut.

== Kickboxing record ==
Professional kickboxing record
25 wins (15 (T)KOs), 14 losses, 1 draw, 0 no contests
Date	Result	Opponent	Event	Location	Method	Round	Time
2023-04-01	Win	(Japan) Kouzi	Rizin 41 – Osaka	Osaka, Japan	Decision (split)	3	3:00
2022-06-19	Loss	(Japan) YA-MAN	THE MATCH 2022	Tokyo, Japan	KO (right hook)	1	1:49
2022-02-27	Win	(Japan) Narufumi Nishimoto	K-1 World GP 2022 Japan	Tokyo, Japan	KO (3 knockdowns)	2	1:58
2021-09-20	Win	(Japan) Hirotaka Urabe	K-1 World GP 2021: Yokohamatsuri	Yokohama, Japan	Decision (unanimous)	3	3:00
2021-03-21	Loss	(Japan) Yuta Murakoshi	K-1: K'Festa 4 Day 1	Tokyo, Japan	Decision (unanimous)	3	3:00
2020-12-13	Win	(Japan) Kotaro Shimano	K-1 World GP 2020 Winter's Crucial Bout	Tokyo, Japan	KO (punches)	2	3:00
2019-06-30	Loss	(Japan) Tatsuya Oiwa	K-1 World GP 2019: Super Bantamweight World Tournament	Tokyo, Japan	Decision (unanimous)	3	3:00
2019-03-10	Loss	(Spain) Jorge Varela	K-1 World GP 2019: K’FESTA 2	Saitama, Japan	KO (left hook)	1	2:41
2018-11-03	Loss	(Japan) Hirotaka Urabe	K-1 World GP 2018: 3rd Super Lightweight Championship Tournament	Saitama, Japan	KO (right hook)	3	2:28
2018-09-24	Win	(Japan) Kaito Ozawa	K-1 World GP 2018: inaugural Cruiserweight Championship Tournament	Saitama, Japan	Decision (unanimous)	3	3:00
2018-06-17	Loss	(Japan) Haruma Saikyo	K-1 World GP 2018: 2nd Featherweight Championship Tournament, Semi-finals	Saitama, Japan	Decision (unanimous)	3	3:00
2018-06-17	Win	(Romania) Silviu Vitez	K-1 World GP 2018: 2nd Featherweight Championship Tournament, Quarter-finals	Saitama, Japan	TKO (ref. stoppage/punches)	1	1:28
2018-03-10	Win	(Japan) Tenma Sano	Krush.86	Tokyo, Japan	Decision (majority)	3	3:00
2017-12-27	Loss	(Japan) Yuta Murakoshi	K-1 World GP 2017 Japan Survival Wars 2017	Tokyo, Japan	Decision (majority)	3	3:00
2017-10-14	Win	(Japan) Ippei Kawano	KHAOS 4	Tokyo, Japan	Decision (unanimous)	3	3:00
2017-08-06	Loss	(Japan) Shoya Masumoto	Krush 78	Tokyo, Japan	Decision (unanimous)	3	3:00
2017-05-28	Loss	(Japan) Tatsuya Oiwa	Krush 76	Tokyo, Japan	Decision (split)	3	3:00
2017-04-16	Win	(Japan) Kazuki Koyano	REBELS 50	Tokyo, Japan	KO (punches)	3	1:19
2017-03-18	Win	(Japan) Ryuta Manabe	KHAOS 1	Tokyo, Japan	KO (middle kick)	3	1:50
2016-09-19	Draw	(Japan) Kento Ito	K-1 World GP 2016 Super Featherweight World Tournament	Tokyo, Japan	Decision	3	3:00
2016-04-29	Win	(Japan) Atom Yamada	JAPAN KICKBOXING INNOVATION "Dream Force-11"	Tokyo, Japan	TKO (ref. stoppage/punches)	2	2:09
Wins Innovation Featherweight title.
2015-12-12	Loss	(Japan) Sota Ichinohe	JAPAN KICKBOXING INNOVATION "Champion's Carnival 2015"	Tokyo, Japan	Decision (unanimous)	5	3:00
2015-08-30	Win	(Japan) Junpei Rogi	SNKA "WINNERS 2015 3rd"	Tokyo, Japan	KO	3	1:32
2015-05-31	Win	(Japan) Yasuhiko Abe	JAPAN KICKBOXING INNOVATION "Sentou Kai 16"	Tokyo, Japan	TKO (knee)	1	2:57
2015-04-26	Win	(Japan) Kenta Yagami	JAPAN KICKBOXING INNOVATION "Dream Force－7"	Tokyo, Japan	Decision (majority)	3	3:00
2014-12-28	Win	(Japan) Masashi Ochiai	Shuken 23 Joe Tsuchiya Festival	Shizuoka, Japan	KO	1	
2014-11-09	Win	(Japan) Ouji	JAPAN KICKBOXING INNOVATION "Sentou Kai 15"	Tokyo, Japan	TKO (referee stoppage)	1	1:02
2014-08-31	Loss	(Japan) Kyohei	JAPAN KICKBOXING INNOVATION "Ikazuchi Mai"	Matsuyama, Japan	Decision (unanimous)	5	3:00
For the Innovation Super Featherweight title.
2014-05-18	Loss	(Japan) Takuma	JAPAN KICKBOXING INNOVATION "Sentou Kai 14"	Tokyo, Japan	TKO (doctor stoppage)	2	2:51
2013-12-23	Loss	(Japan) Hikaru Machida	JAPAN KICKBOXING INNOVATION "Innovation champion carnival"	Tokyo, Japan	TKO (ref. stoppage/punches)	4	1:23
2013-11-13	Win	(Japan) Kenshiro Aoi	JAPAN KICKBOXING INNOVATION "Sentou Kai 13"	Tokyo, Japan	TKO (corner stoppage)	1	2:32
2013-05-19	Win	(Japan) Ashura	JAPAN KICKBOXING INNOVATION "Sentou Kai 12"	Tokyo, Japan	Decision (unanimous)	3	3:00
2013-02-24	Win	(Japan) Hiroshi SaenchaiGym	NJKF MuayThaiOpen 23	Tokyo, Japan	TKO	2	2:55
2012-12-09	Win	(Japan) Tetsuro Noguchi	MAJKF BREAK－32 ～SEIZE～	Tokyo, Japan	Decision (unanimous)	3	3:00
Wins 2012 MAJKF Rookie Tournament Featherweight title.
Legend: Win Loss Draw/no contest Notes

== See also ==
- List of male kickboxers
