= Yuki Egawa =

Japanese kickboxer (born 1998)

Yuuki Egawa
- Born: 江川優生; February 6, 1998 (age 28); Tokyo, Japan
- Height: 171 cm (5 ft 7 in)
- Weight: 60 kg (130 lb; 9.4 st)
- Division: Strawweight
- Style: Kickboxing
- Stance: Orthodox
- Fighting out of: Tokyo, Japan
- Team: Power of Dream
- Trainer: Seiichi Furukawa
- Years active: 2013–present

Kickboxing record
- Total: 26
- Wins: 18
- By knockout: 12
- Losses: 7
- By knockout: 0
- Draws: 1
- Last updated on: September 22, 2020

Yuki Egawa (江川 優生, Egawa Yūki) is a Japanese kickboxer, currently competing in the super featherweight division of K-1. A professional competitor since 2013, he is the former Krush Featherweight and K-1 Featherweight champion.

Combat Press ranked him as a top ten super flyweight between September 2020, when he peaked at #2, and July 2021. He was furthermore ranked the #2 strawweight in August 2020.

== Fighting style ==
Yuki Egawa is a swarming pressure fighter. He likes to make use of non-committal low kicks and feints to force his opponent to strike. Once his opponent's feet are planted and the weight is fully transferred onto the lead foot, Egawa swarms into the pocket and unleashes a combination of body and head strikes. Egawa makes use of lead-leg snap kicks and body kicks, while cutting the ring with small measured steps, to maintain his desired distance and force his opponent into the ropes where he can punch in combinations.

== Kickboxing career ==
=== Early career ===
==== Super Bantamweight career ====
Egawa made his professional debut against Yuuta Uchiyama at SUK Phumpanmuang×TRIBELATE vol.41 on October 26, 2013. He won the fight by a first-round knockout.

Egawa made his Krush debut against Tsubasa at Krush.46 on October 5, 2014. The fight was ruled a draw. Egawa was next scheduled to face Fumiya Hata at Krush.60 on November 14, 2015. He won the fight by a first-round knockout.

Egawa was made his K-1 debut against Reiji Kasami at K-1 World GP 2016 -65kg Japan Tournament on March 4, 2016. He won the fight by unanimous decision.

Egawa was scheduled to face Yuki Masato at Krush.67 on July 18, 2016. Egawa knocked Masato down twice in the first round, with a left hook and left uppercut. He was unable to finish Masato, but won the fight by unanimous decision, with all three judges scoring the fight 30–26 in his favor.

Egawa was scheduled to face Ryota at K-1 World GP 2016 -57.5 kg World Tournament on November 3, 2016. He won the fight with a body shot in the first round.

Egawa returned to Krush for his next bout, and was scheduled to face Masafumi Kurasaki at Krush.73 on February 18, 2017. He won the fight by a first-round left hook knockout.

Egawa made his first, and only, appearance in K-1's KHAOS brand against Riku Morisaka at KHAOS.3 on July 8, 2017. The fight was ruled a draw after the first three rounds, and accordingly went into an extension round. Morisaka was awarded the split decision, after the fourth round was fought.

==== Move up to featherweight ====
Following his first professional loss, Egawa was scheduled to face Koichiro Nabeshima at Krush.81 on October 1, 2017. He moved up to featherweight for this bout, a 2.5 kg increase in weight compared to his previous fights. He won the fight by a first-round knockout.

Egawa was scheduled to face Shoya Masumoto at Krush.85 on February 12, 2018. Masumoto won the fight by majority decision, with scores of 29–28, 28–28 and 29–28.

Egawa returned to K-1 for his next fight, as he was scheduled to face Yuta Otaki at K-1 World GP 2018: Featherweight Championship Tournament on June 17, 2018. Egawa knocked Otaki down early on in the first round, with a left hook. He continued landing unanswered shots, which forced the referee to stop the fight.

Egawa was scheduled to face Hayato at K-1 World GP 2018: 3rd Super Lightweight Championship Tournament on November 3, 2018. The fight was ruled a draw following the first three rounds, with one judge scoring the fight as an even 29–29, while the remaining two judges were split between Egawa and Hayato. Egawa was awarded the unanimous decision after an extra round was fought.

=== Krush Featherweight champion ===
==== Egawa vs. Saikyo ====
Egawa was scheduled to challenge the reigning Krush Featherweight champion Haruma Saikyo in the main event of Krush.97 on January 26, 2019, in what was Saikyo's second title defense. Egawa won the fight by majority decision, with scores of 30–29, 29-29 and 30–28. During the post-fight interview, Egawa stated his desire to fight for the K-1 title in the near future. During a K-1 press-conference held on February 1, 2019, Egawa claimed that he had broken his hand prior to the Masumoto match in February 2018, although the injury had healed by the Saikyo fight.

==== Egawa vs. Tetsu ====
Egawa was scheduled to make his first Krush title defense against Tetsu at Krush.102 on June 21, 2019. Egawa was forced to take a five-month rest from competition, as he had injured his left hand against Saikyo. He prepared for the bout at his primary gym Power of Dream, while also spending a portion of his fight camp at the Sitsongpeenong gym in Thailand. Egawa won the fight by a first-round technical knockout. At the halfway point of the round, Egawa stunned Tetsu with a left hook, and soon after dropped him with a second left hook. Tetsu was able to beat the eight-count, but was quickly floored once again with a right hook. The fight was stopped at the 2:14 minute mark of the first round, after Tetsu was knocked down with an uppercut.

=== K-1 Featherweight champion ===
==== K-1 Featherweight Grand Prix ====
Egawa was scheduled to participate in the 2019 K-1 Featherweight World Grand Prix, held at K-1 World GP 2019 Yokohamatsuri on November 24, 2019. He was set to take on 2018 K-1 Featherweight Grand Prix semifinalist Jorge Varela in the quarterfinal bout. Egawa won the fight by a first-round knockout. He forced Varela to shell up with several body shots midway through the round, before finally dropping him with a left hook to the body at the 1:49 minute mark.

In the tournament semifinals, Egawa faced Arthur Meyer, who earned his place with a second-round technical knockout of Haruma Saikyo. Egawa won the fight by a first-round knockout, once again finishing his opponent with a body blow, landing a spinning back kick near the end of the round. He faced Jawsuayai Sor.Dechaphan in the tournament finals, and once more won the fight by a first-round knockout. Egawa was aggressive from the opening bell and knocked Jawsuayai down with a body shot 40 seconds into the fight. He knocked Jawsuayai out with a liver shot 20 seconds later.

His success in the Grand Prix prompted K-1 to award him the 2019 "Fighter of the Year" honors, while Combat Press named him their 2019 "Breakout Fighter of the Year".

==== Egawa vs. Tsubakihara duology ====
Egawa vacated his Krush title on February 3, 2020, to focus on defending his K-1 title.

Egawa was scheduled to face the divisional newcomer Tatsuya Tsubakihara in a non-title bout at K-1 World GP 2020 in Osaka on September 22, 2020. As he was at the time considered to be the second best 57 kg kickboxer in the world, and due to Tsubakihara's recent arrival to the division, Egawa entered the fight as a significant favorite. Tsubakihara won the fight by majority decision, with two judges awarding him scores of 30-29 and 30–28. He kept distance from the advancing Egawa and scored with a combination of jabs and front kicks, while Egawa was unable to successfully cut off the ring.

Egawa complained of a hand injury during the post-fight conference and asked for a rematch. The rematch between the two was scheduled as a title fight for K-1:K'Festa 4 Day 1 on March 21, 2021. Tsubakihara and Egawa were considered to be the second and third best kickboxers in the world at the time, respectively. The fight was once again closely contested, with two judges scoring it as a 29-29 and 30–30 draw, while the third judge scored it 30-29 for Tsubakihara. Tsubakihara the split decision, after an extra round was fought.

=== Super Featherweight career ===
Egawa moved up to super featherweight for his next bout and was scheduled to fight Tatsuya Oiwa at K-1 World GP 2021 in Fukuoka on July 17, 2021. Egawa later withdrew from due bout due to COVID-19 protocols. He was rescheduled to face Oiwa at K-1: K'Festa 5 on April 3, 2022. He lost the fight by unanimous decision, with scores of 30–29, 30–29 and 30–28.

Egawa was booked to face Chachai Maki at K-1 World GP 2022 in Fukuoka on August 11, 2022. He won the fight by unanimous decision, with scores of 30–27, 30–28 and 29–28.

Egawa faced the former Krush Super Featherweight champion Kotaro Shimano at K-1 World GP 2022 in Osaka on December 3, 2022. He stopped Shimano with a flurry of punches at the 1:58 minute mark of the opening round, after having knocked him down with a left hook shortly prior.

Egawa was expected to face Adam Bouarourou at K-1 World GP 2023: K'Festa 6 on March 12, 2023. Bouarourou withdrew from the fight on March 9, due to a muscle tear in his right calf, and was replaced by Kang Yun-Seong. Egawa won the fight by a first-round knockout.

Egawa faced the 2022 Krush Super Featherweight tournament runner-up Tomoya Yokoyama at K-1 World GP 2023: ReBOOT～K-1 ReBIRTH～ on September 10, 2023. He lost the fight by unanimous decision, with three scorecards of 30–29 in his favor.

Egawa faced Hyuma Hitachi at K-1 World MAX 2024 - World Tournament Opening Round on March 20, 2024. The fight was ruled a unanimous decision draw after the first three rounds were contested, with all three ringside officials handing in an even 28–28 scorecard. Egawa won the fight by split decision, after an extra fourth round was fought.

== Titles and accomplishments ==
- K-1
  - 2019 Krush -57.5 kg Champion (defended once)
  - 2019 K-1 World GP -57.5 kg Championship Tournament winner
  - 2019 Fighter of the Year Award
- CombatPress.com
  - 2019 Breakout Fighter of the Year

== Kickboxing record ==
Kickboxing record
18 wins (12 (T)KOs), 7 losses, 1 draw, 0 no contests
Date	Result	Opponent	Event	Location	Method	Round	Time
2026-04-11	Loss	(Japan) Narufumi Nishimoto	K-1 Genki 2026	Tokyo, Japan	Decision (unanimous)	3	3:00
2024-03-20	Win	(Japan) Hyuma Hitachi	K-1 World MAX 2024 - World Tournament Opening Round	Tokyo, Japan	Ext.R decision (split)	4	3:00
2023-09-10	Loss	(Japan) Tomoya Yokoyama	K-1 World GP 2023: ReBOOT～K-1 ReBIRTH～	Yokohama, Japan	Decision (unanimous)	3	3:00
2023-03-12	Win	(South Korea) Kang Yun Seong	K-1 World GP 2023: K'Festa 6	Tokyo, Japan	KO (punches)	1	1:50
2022-12-03	Win	(Japan) Kotaro Shimano	K-1 World GP 2022 in Osaka	Osaka, Japan	TKO (punches)	1	1:58
2022-08-11	Win	(Thailand) Chatchai Maki	K-1 World GP 2022 in Fukuoka	Fukuoka, Japan	Decision (unanimous)	3	3:00
2022-04-03	Loss	(Japan) Tatsuya Oiwa	K-1: K'Festa 5	Tokyo, Japan	Decision (unanimous)	3	3:00
2021-03-21	Loss	(Japan) Tatsuya Tsubakihara	K-1:K'Festa 4 Day 1	Tokyo, Japan	Ext.R decision (split)	4	3:00
Loses K-1 Featherweight (-57.5kg) title.
2020-09-22	Loss	(Japan) Tatsuya Tsubakihara	K-1 World GP 2020 in Osaka	Osaka, Japan	Decision (majority)	3	3:00
2019-11-24	Win	(Thailand) Jawsuayai Sor.Dechaphan	K-1 World GP 2019 Yokohamatsuri, -57.5 kg Championship Tournament Final	Yokohama, Japan	KO (left hook to the body)	1	0:58
Wins the 2019 K-1 Featherweight World Grand Prix and the vacant K-1 Featherweight title.
2019-11-24	Win	(France) Arthur Meyer	K-1 World GP 2019 Yokohamatsuri, -57.5 kg Championship Tournament Semi Final	Yokohama, Japan	KO (spinning back kick)	1	2:52
2019-11-24	Win	(Spain) Jorge Varela	K-1 World GP 2019 Yokohamatsuri, -57.5 kg Championship Tournament Quarter Final	Yokohama, Japan	KO (left hook to the body)	1	1:49
2019-06-21	Win	(Japan) Tetsuji Noda	Krush.102	Tokyo, Japan	TKO (3 knockdowns)	1	2:14
Defends the Krush Featherweight title.
2019-01-26	Win	(Japan) Haruma Saikyo	Krush.97	Tokyo, Japan	Decision (majority)	3	3:00
Wins the Krush Featherweight title.
2018-11-03	Win	(Japan) Hayato	K-1 World GP 2018: 3rd Super Lightweight Championship Tournament	Saitama, Japan	Ext.R decision (unanimous)	4	3:00
2018-06-17	Win	(Japan) Yuta Otaki	K-1 World GP 2018: Featherweight Championship Tournament	Japan	KO (punches)	1	1:28
2018-02-12	Loss	(Japan) Shoya Masumoto	Krush.85	Tokyo, Japan	Decision (majority)	3	3:00
2017-10-01	Win	(Japan) Koichiro Nabeshima	Krush.81	Tokyo, Japan	KO (left hook)	1	1:02
2017-07-08	Loss	(Japan) Riku Morisaka	KHAOS.3	Tokyo, Japan	Ext.R decision (split)	4	3:00
2017-02-18	Win	(Japan) Masafumi Kurasaki	Krush.73	Tokyo, Japan	KO (left hook)	1	1:10
2016-11-03	Win	(Japan) Ryota	K-1 World GP 2016 -57.5 kg World Tournament	Tokyo, Japan	KO (left hook to the body)	1	1:15
2016-07-18	Win	(Japan) Yuki Masato	Krush.67	Tokyo, Japan	Decision (unanimous)	3	3:00
2016-03-04	Win	(Japan) Reiji Kasami	K-1 World GP 2016 -65kg Japan Tournament	Tokyo, Japan	Decision (unanimous)	3	3:00
2015-11-14	Win	(Japan) Fumiya Hata	Krush.60	Tokyo, Japan	KO (punches)	1	1:59
2014-10-05	Draw	(Japan) Tsubasa	Krush.46	Tokyo, Japan	Decision	3	3:00
2013-10-26	Win	(Japan) Yuuta Uchiyama	SUK Phumpanmuang×TRIBELATE vol.41	Tokyo, Japan	KO	1	1:25
Legend: Win Loss Draw/no contest Notes

=== Amateur record ===
Amateur kickboxing record
Date	Result	Opponent	Event	Location	Method	Round	Time
2013-09-01	Win	(Japan) Date	BigBang Amateur Kickboxing	Tokyo, Japan	Decision	2	2:00
2013-07-14	Loss	(Japan) Koki Takeuchi	BigBang Amateur Kickboxing Tournament, Semi Final	Tokyo, Japan	Decision	2	2:00
2013-07-14	Win	(Japan) Ichiro Kodama	BigBang Amateur Kickboxing Tournament, Quarter Final	Tokyo, Japan	Decision	2	2:00
2013-06-02	Win	(Japan) Tenmu Uehara	BigBang Amateur Kickboxing	Tokyo, Japan	Decision	2	2:00
2013-05-05	Loss	(Japan) Shinjiro Saito	BigBang Amateur Kickboxing	Tokyo, Japan	Decision	2	2:00
2013-03-24	Win	(Japan)	IJKF	Tokyo, Japan			
2012-12-02	Loss	(Japan) Shun Asaga	Kokusai Junior Kickboxing Championship Final	Tokyo, Japan	Decision		
2012-09-02	Loss	(Japan) Rasta Kido	BigBang Amateur Kickboxing	Tokyo, Japan	Decision		
2012-07-16	Draw	(Japan) Kenichi Kurata	BigBang Amateur Kickboxing	Tokyo, Japan	Decision	2	2:00
2012-06-10	Loss	(Japan) Sho Yamaura	Muay Thai WINDY Super Fight vol.12	Tokyo, Japan	Decision	2	2:00
For the Windy Super Fight -55kg title.
2012-04-29	Loss	(Japan) Kaito Fukuda	Kaikokusai Junior Kickboxing	Japan	Decision		2:00
2012-03-29	Loss	(Japan) Shodai Matsuoka	MuayThaiPhoon Regional Opposition	Japan	KO	1	1:41
2012-03-04	Loss	(Japan) Rasta Kido	All Japan Jr. Kick Kanto Area Selection Tournament, Final	Tokyo, Japan	Decision		
2012-03-04	Win	(Japan)	All Japan Jr. Kick Kanto Area Selection Tournament, Semi Final	Tokyo, Japan	Decision		
2012-03-04	Win	(Japan)	All Japan Jr. Kick Kanto Area Selection Tournament, Quarter Final	Tokyo, Japan	Decision		
2011-12-04	Loss	(Japan) Yuma Sano	4th Kaikokusai Junior Kickboxing	Japan	Decision		
Legend: Win Loss Draw/no contest Notes

== See also ==
- List of male kickboxers
- List of K-1 champions
- List of Krush champions
