= Jaosuayai Mor. Krungthepthonburi =

Thai Muay Thai fighter

Jaosuayai Sor.Dechaphan
- Born: Piyachat Chuangsukon; September 8, 2001 (age 25); Bangkok, Thailand
- Other names: The Floating Knee; The Ong Bak Warrior; Jaosuayai; Jaosuayai Mor Krungthepthonburi (จ้าวเสือใหญ่ ม.กรุงเทพธนบุรี)
- Height: 166 cm (5 ft 5 in)
- Weight: 58 kg (128 lb; 9.1 st)
- Stance: Orthodox
- Fighting out of: Phra Nakhon Si Ayutthaya (city), Thailand
- Team: Sor Dechaphan

Kickboxing record
- Total: 129
- Wins: 83
- By knockout: 32
- Losses: 43
- Draws: 3

Piyachat Chuangsukon (Thai: ปิยะชาติ ช่วงสุพล, born September 8, 2001), also known as Jawsuayai Sor.Dechapan is a Thai Muay Thai fighter and kickboxer. He is the finalist of the 2019 K-1 Featherweight World Grand Prix.

As of August 2021, he was the #5 ranked Super Flyweight in the world by Combat Press. He was ranked in the top 10 from April 2020 to February 2022.

== Career ==
In February 2019, Sor. Dechaphan fought in the Lumpini Stadium against Saenliam Soonkeelanamaipai and won a unanimous decision.

Jawsuayai participated in the 2019 K-1 Featherweight Grand Prix. He defeated Riku Anpo in the quarter-final bout, Hirotaka Urabe in the semi-final, and faced the rising prospect Yuki Egawa in the finals. He lost in the first round, due to a body shot knockout.

Following his K-1 run, Jawsuayai returned to fight at the Lumpini Stadium to fight Petchasawin Mor.Rattanabandit. He lost a unanimous decision.

He returned to K-1 to fight Kaito Ozawa during K'Festa 3. Jawsuayai won the fight by TKO, due to a doctor stoppage at the end of the second round.

Jawsuayai won his next four muay thai fights, defeating Petchasawin Mor.Rattanabandit twice by decision, and knocking out Duangsap Sor.Salacheep and Dom Parunchai. Returning to kickboxing, he was scheduled to fight Shuhei Kumura during K'Festa 4.

== Titles and accomplishments ==
=== Kickboxing ===
- K-1
  - 2019 K-1 World GP -57.5 kg Championship Tournament Runner-up

=== Muay Thai ===
- Channel 7 Boxing Stadium
  - 2020 Channel 7 Best Technique of the Year Award

== Fight record ==
Muay Thai & Kickboxing record
83 Wins (32 (T)KO's), 44 Losses, 2 Draws
| Date | Result | Opponent | Event | Location | Method | Round | Time |
| 2026-09-04 | Loss | (Colombia) Jhordan Estupinan | ONE Fight Night 47 | Bangkok, Thailand | Decision (Unanimous) | 3 | 3:00 |
| 2026-06-05 | Loss | (China) Yuan Pengjie | ONE Friday Fights 157, Lumpinee Stadium | Bangkok, Thailand | Decision (Unanimous) | 3 | 3:00 |
| 2026-03-20 | Loss | (Thailand) Pompet Panthonggym | ONE Friday Fights 147, Lumpinee Stadium | Bangkok, Thailand | TKO (Referee stoppage) | 3 | 2:25 |
| 2025-12-19 | Loss | (Thailand) Sam-A Gaiyanghadao | ONE Friday Fights 137, Lumpinee Stadium | Bangkok, Thailand | Decision (Unanimous) | 3 | 3:00 |
| 2025-10-03 | Loss | (Azerbaijan) Akif Guluzada | ONE Fight Night 36 | Bangkok, Thailand | Decision (Unanimous) | 3 | 3:00 |
| 2025-06-07 | Win | (Thailand) Nakrob Fairtex | ONE Fight Night 32 | Bangkok, Thailand | KO (punches and head kick) | 1 | 0:53 |
| 2025-03-14 | Win | (Bosnia and Herzegovina) Denis Puric | ONE Friday Fights 100, Lumpinee Stadium | Bangkok, Thailand | TKO (Body kick) | 2 | 1:37 |
| 2025-01-31 | Win | (Thailand) Yodlekpet Or.Atchariya | ONE Friday Fights 95, Lumpinee Stadium | Bangkok, Thailand | KO (Right hook) | 2 | 1:35 |
| 2024-09-27 | Win | (Thailand) Suriyanlek Por.Yenying | ONE Friday Fights 81, Lumpinee Stadium | Bangkok, Thailand | Decision (Unanimous) | 3 | 3:00 |
| 2024-05-31 | Win | (Thailand) Puengluang Baanramba | ONE Friday Fights 65, Lumpinee Stadium | Bangkok, Thailand | KO (Left hook) | 1 | 2:11 |
| 2024-04-05 | Loss | (Thailand) Kongthoranee Sor.Sommai | ONE Friday Fights 58, Lumpinee Stadium | Bangkok, Thailand | Decision (Unanimous) | 3 | 3:00 |
| 2023-12-22 | Win | (Thailand) Phetsukumvit Boybangna | ONE Friday Fights 46, Lumpinee Stadium | Bangkok, Thailand | Decision (Majority) | 3 | 3:00 |
| 2023-11-10 | Win | (Thailand) Paidang Kiatsongrit | ONE Friday Fights 40, Lumpinee Stadium | Bangkok, Thailand | KO (Left hook) | 2 | 2:21 |
| 2023-08-11 | Loss | (Thailand) Kongsuk Fairtex | ONE Friday Fights 28, Lumpinee Stadium | Bangkok, Thailand | Decision (Unanimous) | 3 | 3:00 |
| 2023-06-09 | Win | (Thailand) Phetsukumvit Boybangna | ONE Friday Fights 20, Lumpinee Stadium | Bangkok, Thailand | KO (Right cross) | 1 | 2:30 |
| 2023-04-29 | Win | (Sweden) Freddy Castro Gonzalez | Rajadamnern World Series | Bangkok, Thailand | Decision (Unanimous) | 3 | 3:00 |
| 2023-04-15 | Win | (Brazil) Rosouro Manop Gym | Rajadamnern World Series | Bangkok, Thailand | TKO (Doctor stoppage) | 3 | 1:04 |
| 2023-03-18 | Loss | (Cambodia) Kaka Paeminburi | RWS + Kiatpetch, Rajadamnern Stadium | Bangkok, Thailand | Decision (Split) | 3 | 3:00 |
| 2023-02-18 | Win | (Thailand) Mahamongkol PakyokTH | RWS VickRajadamnern, Rajadamnern Stadium | Bangkok, Thailand | Decision (Unanimous) | 3 | 3:00 |
| 2023-01-07 | Win | (Thailand) StarBoy Petchkiatpetch | Ruamponkon Samui: Samui Super Fight, Phetchbuncha Stadium | Ko Samui, Thailand | KO (Uppercut) | 2 | |
| 2022-10-30 | Win | (Thailand) Petchdam Petckiatpetch | Chang MuayThai Kiatpetch Amarin Super Fight, Rajadamnern Stadium | Bangkok, Thailand | KO (Front kick) | 3 | |
| 2022-10-09 | Win | (Thailand) Rambong Sor.Terapat | Channel 7 Stadium | Bangkok, Thailand | Decision | 5 | 3:00 |
| 2022-08-11 | Loss | (Japan) Shuhei Kumura | K-1 World GP 2022 in Fukuoka, Tournament Quarterfinals | Fukuoka, Japan | TKO (2 knockdowns) | 2 | 1:03 |
| 2022-06-23 | Win | (Thailand) Meechok Bangkokalaiyon | Chang Muay Thai Kiatpetch + Hippy Fight | Chumphon province, Thailand | Decision | 5 | 3:00 |
| 2022-06-04 | Loss | (Thailand) Pansak Wor.Wantawee | Fairtex Fight + Infliction, Lumpinee Stadium | Bangkok, Thailand | Decision (Unanimous) | 3 | 3:00 |
| 2022-04-24 | Win | (Japan) Takeru Owaki | Suk Wanchai MuayThai Super Fight | Nagoya, Japan | KO (High kick) | 4 | |
| 2022-04-03 | Loss | (Thailand) Focus Adsanpatong | Channel 7 Stadium | Bangkok, Thailand | Decision | 5 | 3:00 |
| 2022-01-15 | Win | (Thailand) Ratchasak Tded99 | TorNamThai Lumpinee TKO Kiatpetch, Lumpinee Stadium | Bangkok, Thailand | Decision | 5 | 3:00 |
| 2021-12-19 | Win | (Thailand) Tuangsap Sor.Salacheep | Kiatpetch Amarin Super Fight, Rajadamnern Stadium | Bangkok, Thailand | Decision | 5 | 3:00 |
| 2021-10-10 | Loss | (Cambodia) Kaka Paeminburi | Channel 7 Stadium | Bangkok, Thailand | Decision | 5 | 3:00 |
| 2021-04-04 | Loss | (Thailand) Chatchai P.K Saenchaimuaythaigym | Channel 7 Stadium | Bangkok, Thailand | Decision | 5 | 3:00 |
| 2021-02-14 | Win | (Cambodia) Kaka Paeminburi | Amarin Super Fight: Chang Muay Thai Kiatpetch, Or.Tor.Gor.3 Stadium | Nonthaburi, Thailand | Decision | 5 | 3:00 |
| 2020-11-22 | Win | (Thailand) Dom Parunchai | Channel 7 Stadium | Bangkok, Thailand | KO (Flying Knee) | 2 | |
| 2020-10-04 | Win | (Thailand) Duangsap Sor.Salacheep | Amarin Super Fight: Chang Muay Thai Kiatpetch, Or.Tor.Gor.3 Stadium | Nonthaburi, Thailand | KO (Elbow) | 4 | |
| 2020-08-22 | Win | (Thailand) Petchasawin Mor.Rattanabandit | RuampalangkonMuay Kajatpai Covid, Hat Yai Stadium | Hat Yai, Thailand | Decision | 5 | 3:00 |
| 2020-07-12 | Win | (Thailand) Petchasawin Mor.Rattanabandit | Amarin Super Fight: Chang Muay Thai Kiatpetch, Or.Tor.Gor.3 Stadium | Nonthaburi, Thailand | Decision | 5 | 3:00 |
| 2020-03-22 | Win | (Japan) Kaito Ozawa | K-1 World GP 2020: K’Festa 3 | Saitama, Japan | TKO (Doctor Stoppage) | 2 | 3:00 |
| 2019-12-31 | Loss | (Thailand) Petchasawin Mor.Rattanabandit | Lumpinee Stadium | Bangkok, Thailand | Decision | 5 | 3:00 |
| 2019-11-24 | Loss | (Japan) Yuki Egawa | K-1 World GP 2019 Yokohamatsuri, -57.5 kg Tournament Final | Yokohama, Japan | KO (Left Hook to the Body) | 1 | 0:58 |
For the K-1 GP World GP -57.5kg Tournament title.
| 2019-11-24 | Win | (Japan) Hirotaka Urabe | K-1 World GP 2019 Yokohamatsuri, -57.5 kg Tournament Semi-final | Yokohama, Japan | Ext.R Decision (Unanimous) | 4 | 3:00 |
| 2019-11-24 | Win | (Japan) Riku Anpo | K-1 World GP 2019 Yokohamatsuri, -57.5 kg Tournament Quarter-final | Yokohama, Japan | KO (Flying Knee + Left Hook) | 1 | 1:14 |
| 2019-09-16 | Win | (Thailand) Pansak Wor.Wantawee | Samui Festival + Kiatpetch | Koh Samui, Thailand | Decision | 5 | 3:00 |
| 2019-08-04 | Loss | (Thailand) Longern Dabransarakham | Amarin Super Fight: Chang Muay Thai Kiatpetch, Or.Tor.Gor.3 Stadium | Nonthaburi, Thailand | KO (Left Cross) | 5 | |
| 2019-05-19 | Loss | (Thailand) Petchniran Dabransarakham | Channel 7 Stadium | Bangkok, Thailand | Decision | 5 | 3:00 |
| 2019-04-07 | Win | (Thailand) Petchsamret MuayhujengChaiyaphum | Or.Tor.Gor.3 Stadium | Nonthaburi, Thailand | KO (Flying Knee) | 3 | |
| 2019-02-23 | Win | (Thailand) Saenliam Soonkeelanamaipai | Lumpinee Stadium | Bangkok, Thailand | Decision | 5 | 3:00 |
| 2018-12-23 | Loss | (Thailand) Meechok Bangkokalaiyon | Or.Tor.Gor.3 Stadium | Nonthaburi, Thailand | KO (Right Elbow) | 3 | |
| 2018-11-17 | Win | (Thailand) Sun Sitnumnoi | Lumpinee Stadium | Bangkok, Thailand | Decision | 5 | 3:00 |
| 2018-08-14 | Loss | (Thailand) Kritpetch Rattanapanu | Or.Tor.Gor.3 Stadium | Nonthaburi, Thailand | Decision | 5 | 3:00 |
| 2018-07-14 | Draw | (Thailand) Pansak Wor.Wantawee | Lumpinee Stadium | Bangkok, Thailand | Decision | 5 | 3:00 |
| 2018-06-03 | Win | (Thailand) Amnuaydet Wor.Wantawee | Or.Tor.Gor.3 Stadium | Nonthaburi, Thailand | Decision | 5 | 3:00 |
| 2018-05-11 | Win | (Thailand) Densabua NayokAtasala | Kiatpetch Super Fight + Sor.Dechapan | Satun, Thailand | KO | 2 | |
| 2018-04-14 | Win | (Japan) Shiro | Lumpinee Stadium | Bangkok, Thailand | KO (Flying knee) | 3 | |
| 2018-02-25 | Loss | (Thailand) Narongchai Sitjomyuth | Or.Tor.Gor.3 Stadium | Nonthaburi, Thailand | KO (Right High Kick) | 2 | |
| 2018-01-20 | NC | (Thailand) Banyawut Kiatjaroenchai | Lumpinee Stadium | Bangkok, Thailand | No contest | | |
| 2017-12-17 | Loss | (Thailand) Chamuakphet Sor.Takudtong | Channel 7 Stadium | Bangkok, Thailand | Decision | 5 | 3:00 |
| 2017-11-18 | Win | (Thailand) Jaoinsee Kiatjaroenchai | Lumpinee Stadium | Bangkok, Thailand | KO (Right High Kick) | 2 | |
| 2017-09-10 | Win | (Thailand) Desellek Singmanee | Kiatpetch promotion at The Wharf Plaz | Bangkok, Thailand | KO | 2 | |
| 2017-07-14 | Loss | (Thailand) Phetsamila Kiatjaroenchai | Lumpinee Stadium | Bangkok, Thailand | KO (Low Kicks) | 3 | |
| 2017-06-11 | Win | (Thailand) Kwaeng KongthoraneeMuayThai | Channel 7 Stadium | Bangkok, Thailand | Decision | 5 | 3:00 |
| 2017-05-06 | Win | (Thailand) Maito Sitkamnanyai | Lumpinee Stadium | Bangkok, Thailand | KO (Right High Kick) | 3 | |
| 2017-04-01 | Win | (Thailand) Phetrayong Sor.Boonyungyot | Omnoi Stadium | Bangkok, Thailand | KO (Right high kick) | 2 | |
| 2017-02-18 | Win | (Thailand) Sumaoynoi J PowerRoofPuket | Lumpinee Stadium | Bangkok, Thailand | Decision | 5 | 3:00 |
| 2017-01-14 | Win | (Thailand) Aik Parunchai | Lumpinee Stadium | Bangkok, Thailand | KO (Left Hook) | 3 | |
| 2016-12-10 | Loss | (Thailand) Phetpalangphon Jor.Thavichai | Lumpinee Stadium | Bangkok, Thailand | KO (Body Punches) | 3 | 1:30 |
| 2016-08-23 | Win | (Thailand) Dawjai Sitlomnaw | Lumpinee Stadium | Bangkok, Thailand | KO | 2 | |
| 2016-06-12 | Loss | (Thailand) Theprathandet Petchthong | Rangsit Stadium | Thailand | Decision | 5 | 3:00 |
| 2016-05-14 | Win | (Thailand) Samartlek Muaythaidotcom | Omnoi Stadium | Bangkok, Thailand | Decision | 5 | 3:00 |
| 2016-04-30 | Win | (Thailand) Panphet Sitnumnoi | Lumpinee Stadium | Bangkok, Thailand | KO (Right High Kick) | 1 | |
| 2016-01-23 | Win | (Thailand) Theprathandet Petchthong | | Ko Samui, Thailand | KO | 3 | |
| 2015-11-14 | Win | (Thailand) Phetchabat Chaiyaphum | Min Buri Stadium | Bangkok, Thailand | KO | 3 | |
| 2015-07-11 | Win | (Thailand) Payukjiew Kelasport | Min Buri Stadium | Bangkok, Thailand | KO | 4 | |
Legend: Win Loss Draw/No contest Notes

== See also ==
- List of male kickboxers
