= Takumi Terada =

Japanese kickboxer (born 2000)

- Born: 寺田 匠 December 26, 2000 (age 25); Kobayashi, Miyazaki, Japan
- Nickname: ROWDY
- Height: 170 cm (5 ft 7 in)
- Weight: 57 kg (126 lb; 9.0 st)
- Stance: Orthodox
- Fighting out of: Tokyo, Japan
- Team: K-1 Gym Sagami Ono KREST (2020.2023); Team Vasileus (2024-present)
- Years active: 2020 - present

Kickboxing record
- Total: 15
- Wins: 13
- By knockout: 5
- Losses: 2

Takumi Terada (Japanese: 寺田 匠, Terada Takumi; born 26 December 2000) is a Japanese kickboxer, currently competing in RISE. He is a former K-1 Featherweight Champion.

As of August 2025, Tereda was ranked number one in the world at 58 kg by Combat Press.

== Kickboxing career ==
=== Early career ===
Terada made his professional debut against Michitaka Uchida at KHAOS 10 on April 4, 2020. He won the fight by unanimous decision, with two scorecards of 30–27 and one scorecard of 30–26. Terada scored the sole knockdown of the fight, as he dropped Uchida with a head kick. Terada made his K-1 debut against Hirotaka Sadamatsu at K-1 World GP 2020 in Fukuoka on November 3, 2020. He won the fight by a first-round knockout, flooring Sadamatsu with a right cross at the 2:06 minute mark of the opening round.

Terada faced the former ACCEL bantamweight champion Naoki Takahashi at K-1 World GP 2021 in Fukuoka on July 17, 2021, in his first fight of the year. He won the fight by a close unanimous decision, with all three judges scoring the fight 30–29 in his favor. Terada was next booked to face Yuta Matsuyama at Krush 132 on December 18, 2021. He won the fight by a first-round knockout.

Terada faced Rei Inagaki at Krush 137 on May 21, 2022. The pair previously fought as amateurs on December 21, 2019, with Inagaki winning by majority decision. Terada was more successful in their second meeting, as he won the fight by unanimous decision, with scores of 30–27, 30–26 and 29–27. He knocked Inagaki down with a right hook in the first round.

Terada faced Ginji in the reserve bout of the 2022 K-1 Featherweight World Grand Prix, which was held at K-1 World GP 2022 in Fukuoka on August 11, 2022. He won the fight by unanimous decision, with two judges scoring the bout 30–27 for him, while the third judge scored it 30–28 in his favor.

Terada faced the former Krush Featherweight (-57.5kg) champion Takahito Niimi Krush 150 on June 16, 2023. He lost the fight by unanimous decision, with all three judges scoring the fight 29–27 in his favor.

Terada faced Takekiyo Tominaga at Rizin Landmark 8 on February 24, 2024, winning the bout in the first round after knocking him down three times in the round.

Terada faced Shoki Kaneda at K-1 World MAX 2024 - World Championship Tournament Final on July 7, 2024. He won the fight by majority decision.

=== K-1 featherweight champion ===
Terada challenged the K-1 Featherweight champion Taito Gunji at K-1 World MAX 2024 on September 29, 2024. He won the fight by unanimous decision, after an extra fourth round was contested.

Terada made his inaugural title defense against Takahito Niimi at K-1 World MAX 2025 on February 9, 2025. He won the fight by unanimous decision, with scores of 30—29, 30—28 and 30—28.

Terada faced Angelos Kaponis in a non-title bout at K-1 Dontaku on July 13, 2025. He won the fight by a first-round knockout.

Terada vacated the K-1 Featherweight title on February 20, 2026.

It was announced that he cancelled a contract with K-1 on February 25.

== Titles and accomplishments ==
- K-1
  - 2024 K-1 Featherweight (-57.5kg) Champion
- International Sport Kickboxing Association
  - 2023 ISKA Oriental Rules World Super-featherweight (59 kg) Champion
    - One successful title defense

Awards

- 2021 K-1 Awards Rookie of the Year

== Fight record ==
Professional Kickboxing record
13 Wins (5 (T)KO's), 2 Losses, 0 Draw, 0 No Contest
Date	Result	Opponent	Event	Location	Method	Round	Time
2026-05-28	Win	(New Zealand) Dominic Reed	Kickboxing Fes. GOAT 2	Tokyo, Japan	Decision (Unanimous)	3	3:00
Defends the ISKA Unified rules World Super featherweieght (-59kg) title.
2026-03-28	Loss	(Japan) Haruto Yasumoto	RISE ELDORADO 2026	Tokyo, Japan	Decision (Unanimous)	3	3:00
2025-07-13	Win	(Greece) Angelos Kaponis	K-1 Dontaku	Fukuoka, Japan	KO (Overhand + left hook)	1	1:58
2025-02-09	Win	(Japan) Takahito Niimi	K-1 World MAX 2025	Tokyo, Japan	Decision (Unanimous)	3	3:00
Defends the K-1 Featherweight (-57.5kg) title.
2024-09-29	Win	(Japan) Taito Gunji	K-1 World MAX 2024	Tokyo, Japan	Ext.R Decision (Unanimous)	4	3:00
Wins the K-1 Featherweight (-57.5kg) title.
2024-07-07	Win	(Japan) Shoki Kaneda	K-1 World MAX 2024 - World Championship Tournament Final	Tokyo, Japan	Decision (Majority)	3	3:00
2024-02-24	Win	(Japan) Takekiyo Tominaga	Rizin Landmark 8	Saga, Japan	KO (3 Knockdowns)	1	1:54
2023-11-18	Win	(Italy) Mirko Flumeri	OKTAGON	Turin, Italy	KO (Low kicks)	4	2:50
Wins the vacant ISKA Oriental Rules World Super-featherweight (59kg) title.
2023-06-16	Loss	(Japan) Takahito Niimi	Krush 150	Tokyo, Japan	Decision (Unanimous)	3	3:00
2022-08-11	Win	(Japan) Ginji	K-1 World GP 2022 in Fukuoka, Tournament Reserve	Fukuoka, Japan	Decision (Unanimous)	3	3:00
2022-05-21	Win	(Japan) Rei Inagaki	Krush 137	Tokyo, Japan	Decision (Unanimous)	3	3:00
2021-12-18	Win	(Japan) Yuta Matsuyama	Krush 132	Tokyo, Japan	KO (Left hook)	1	2:22
2021-07-17	Win	(Japan) Naoki Takahashi	K-1 World GP 2021 in Fukuoka	Fukuoka, Japan	Decision (unanimous)	3	3:00
2020-11-03	Win	(Japan) Hirotaka Sadamatsu	K-1 World GP 2020 in Fukuoka	Fukuoka, Japan	KO (Right Cross)	1	2:06
2020-04-04	Win	(Japan) Michitaka Uchida	KHAOS 10	Tokyo, Japan	Decision (unanimous)	3	3:00
Legend: Win Loss Draw/No contest Notes

Amateur Kickboxing record
Date	Result	Opponent	Event	Location	Method	Round	Time
2020-01-18	Win	(Japan) Satoshi Tanaka	Kakutou Dairi Sensou K-1 Final War	Tokyo, Japan	Decision (unanimous)	2	3:00
2019-12-21	Loss	(Japan) Rei Inagaki	Kakutou Dairi Sensou K-1 Final War	Tokyo, Japan	Decision (Majority)	2	3:00
2019-12-21	Win	(Japan) Keima Ozaki	Kakutou Dairi Sensou K-1 Final War	Tokyo, Japan	Decision (Unanimous)	2	3:00
2018-06-13	Win	(Japan) Kohei Kubota	THE OUTSIDER 52	Fukuoka, Japan	KO	1	2:45
Legend: Win Loss Draw/No contest Notes

== See also ==
- List of male kickboxers
