= Tatsuya Tsubakihara =

Japanese kickboxer (born 1997)

- Born: 椿原 龍矢; May 7, 1999 (age 27); Kadoma, Osaka, Japan
- Other names: The Naniwa Samurai
- Height: 170 cm (5 ft 7 in)
- Weight: 57.5 kg (127 lb; 9.05 st)
- Style: Kickboxing
- Stance: Orthodox
- Fighting out of: Hirano, Osaka, Japan
- Team: Gesshinkai Team Samurai
- Trainer: Yasuyuki Nakane
- Rank: 3rd Dan Black Belt in Ryukyu Shōrin-ryū Karate
- Years active: 2016–present

Kickboxing record
- Total: 26
- Wins: 16
- By knockout: 3
- Losses: 9
- By knockout: 0
- Draws: 1

Tatsuya Tsubakihara (Japanese: 椿原龍矢, Tsubakihara Tatsuya; born May 7, 1997) is a Japanese kickboxer, currently fighting in the featherweight division of K-1. He is the former K-1 featherweight champion, having held the title in 2021.

Tsubakihara achieved standout success as an amateur, as he won the 2017 K-1 Koshien Tournament, Japan's most prestigious amateur kickboxing competition, after finishing as the runner-up in the two previous years. He was named the K-1 Rookie of the Year following early professional success and captured the K-1 Featherweight championship three years later. He was subsequently ranked as the second-best -58 kg kickboxer in the world, only behind Tenshin Nasukawa, by Combat Press.

As of April 2023, he is ranked as the fifth best super flyweight (-58 kg) by Combat Press and the fifth best bantamweight (-58 kg) by Beyond Kickboxing. He's been ranked in the Combat Press divisional rankings since October 2020 and the Beyond Kickboxing divisional rankings since their inauguration.

== Early life and amateur career ==
Tsubakihara was inspired to pursue martial arts at the age of five, after seeing an episode of the Fist of the North Star anime, which motivated him to begin training Shōrin-ryū karate at the Gesshinkai Team Samurai. Tsubakihara practiced karate until late middle school, when he began to transition to kickboxing, before fully transitioning after graduating from high school.

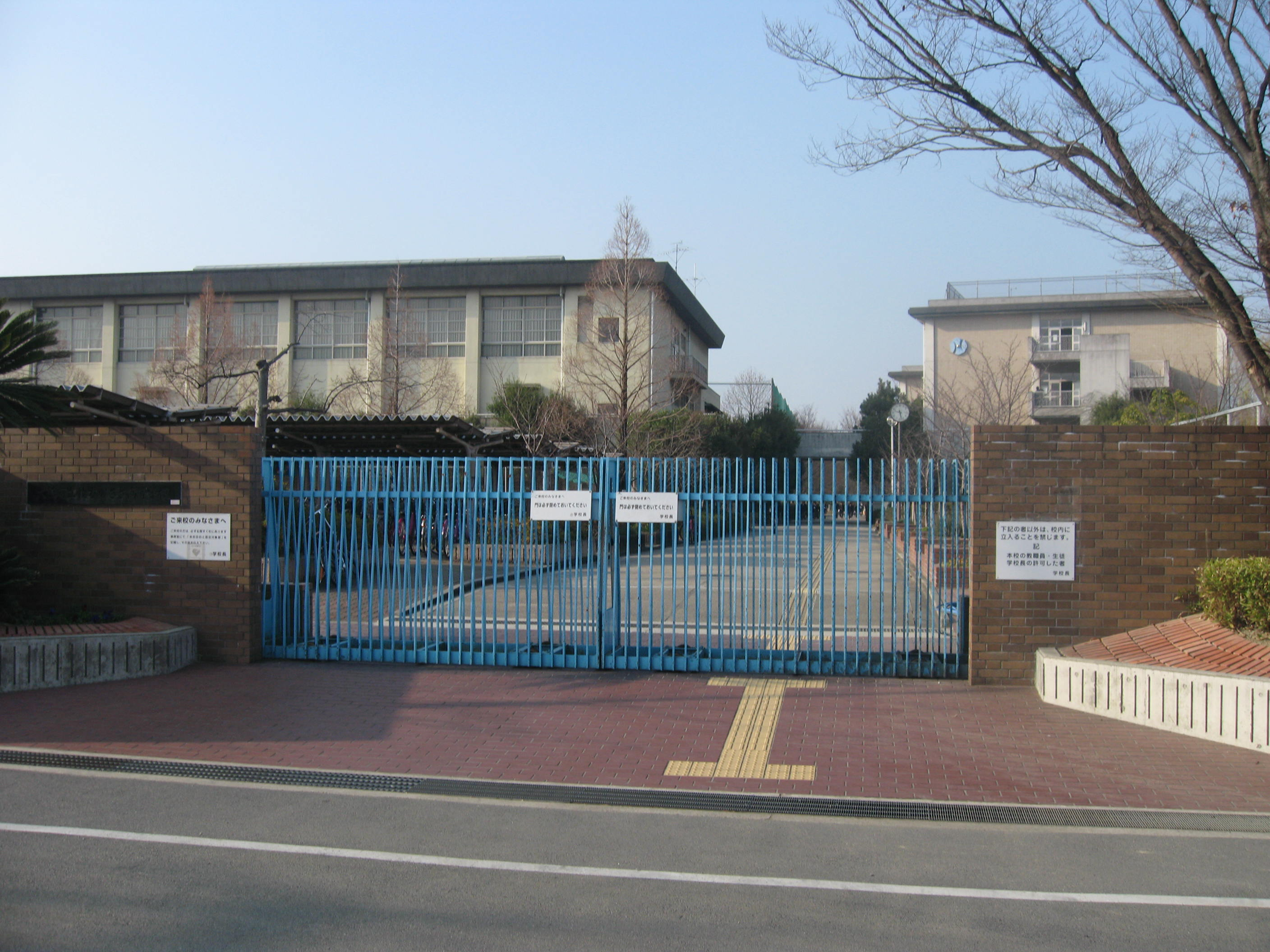
The Hirataka Nagisa High School, which Tsubakihara attended while competing in K-1 Koshien

At the age of 13, Tsubakihara participated in the Kyoken Junior Kickboxing tournament. He would win the Kyoken Middleweight title with decision victories over Taiga Imanaga and Taiki Kiyama in the semifinals and finals respectively. He would go on to defend his title three times, all three times against Taiga Imanaga. The first two title defenses ended in split decisions, after an extra round was fought, while Tsubakihara managed to defeat Imanaga by unanimous decision in his third title defense.

Following his third title defense, Tsubakihara took part in the 2015 K-1 Challenge A-Class tournament, competing in the 60 kg weight class. He won unanimous decisions against Akito Watanabe in the quarterfinals and Ruka Oonuki in the semifinals, and won the tournament with a majority decision against Tsubasa Okamoto in the finals. Two months later, Tsubakihara fought in a K-1 Koshien tournament, for the first time in his career. He won the first three fights of the tournament, most notably beating Taito Gunji by split decision after two additional rounds were fought, before losing a split decision in turn to Haruma Saikyo in the finals.

Tsubakihara participated in the 2016 K-1 Koshien tournament. He fought the second round of the tournament, against Kaito Nagashima, on July 30, 2016, two months after making his professional debut at the age of 17. He won the first three bouts of the tournament against Nagashima, Souta Saito and Yuta Hayashi, but once again fell short in the finals, losing a unanimous decision to Taito Gunji.

Tsubakihara was eligible to participate in the 2017 K-1 Koshien tournament as well. He managed to win the tournament in his third attempt, beating Toki Tamaru in the semifinals and Itsuki Kobori in the finals.

== Professional kickboxing career ==
=== Super Bantamweight career ===
==== Early career ====
Tsubakihara was scheduled to make his professional debut against Yuki Tanioka at HIGHSPEED EX, on May 22, 2016. He made his professional debut at 55 kg. The fight ended in a draw. He notched his first professional victory against Tatsuya Izumi at ALL BOX WORLD 9th, winning the fight by a second-round knockout. His last fight outside of K-1 was against Jin Mandokoro at Hoost Cup Kings Kyoto 2. Tsubakihara won the fight by unanimous decision.

Tsubakihara was scheduled to make his K-1 debut at KHAOS 2, against Taito Gunji. The two of them fought twice as amateurs, trading wins and losses. Tsubakihara won their first professional meeting by majority decision, with two of the three judges scoring the bout in his favor.

Tsubakihara was scheduled to fight Haruma Saikyo at K-1 Survival Wars. The two of them fought previously in the finals of the 2015 K-1 Koshien tournament, with Saikyo winning by split decision. Tsubakihara won the fight by majority decision.

Tsubakihara was scheduled to fight the future Krush Super Bantamweight champion Masashi Kumura at Krush 86. Tsubakihara lost the fight by unanimous decision, with all three judges scoring the bout 30-26 for Kumura.

Tsubakihara was scheduled to fight Riku Morisaka at KHAOS 5. He won the fight by unanimous decision, with two of the judges scoring the bout 30-28 for Tsubakihara.

==== Krush Super Bantamweight tournament ====
His 3–1 record earned Tsubakihara a place in the 2018 Krush Super Bantamweight tournament, being scheduled to fight Yusho Kanemoto in the quarterfinal bout at Krush 93. The other tournament pairings pitted Taito Gunji against Riku Morisaka, Shota Oiwa against Masashi Kumura and Shoya Masumoto against Victor Saravia. Tsubakihara won the fight by a second round technical knockdown, managing to knock Kanemoto down three times. The first knockdown came as Tsubakihara countered Kanemoto's step-in knee with a right straight, the second knockdown came as a result of another right straight, while the third knockdown came as a result of a combination of punches after Kanemoto was pressured into a corner.

Tsubakihara advanced to the tournament semifinals, where he was scheduled to fight Taito Gunji at Krush 96. It was their fourth overall career meeting, with Tsubakihara winning two of their previous three meetings. The fight was as close as their previous three bouts, with Gunji winning a split decision, after an extra round was fought.

==== Later Super Bantamweight career ====
Tsubakihara was scheduled to fight Ryuto at Krush 100. He won the fight by majority decision, with one judge scoring the bout 29-29, while the remaining two judges scored the fight 30-28 for Tsubakihara.

Tsubakihara was scheduled to fight Aoshi at the K-1 World GP 2019: Japan vs World 5 vs 5 & Special Superfight in Osaka event. Aoshi won the fight by majority decision.

Tsubakihara was scheduled to fight Yuto Kuroda at Krush 108. He won the fight by unanimous decision, winning two of the three rounds according to two of the judges, while the last one scored the fight 30-29 for him.

=== Featherweight career ===
==== The Egawa duology ====
Tsubakihara was scheduled to make his featherweight debut against Shoya Masumoto at Krush 114. He won the fight by a third-round head kick knockout. During the post-fight press conference, Tsubakihara asked for a fight at the K-1 World GP 2020 in Osaka, his hometown.

Tsubakihara was granted his request, as he was scheduled to fight the newly crowned K-1 Featherweight champion and the 2019 K-1 "Fighter of the Year" Yuki Egawa. Egawa was at the time considered to be the second best kickboxer at 57.5 kg, and came into the bout as a significant favorite over Tsubakihara. Tsubakihara kept to his patented outfighting style, keeping distance from Egawa and scoring points through jabs and front kicks. He won the fight by majority decision, with two of the judges scoring the bout in his favor (30-29 and 30–28), while the third judge scored the bout as a draw. The results of the fight was considered a massive upset at the time.

During the post-fight conference, Egawa revealed he had suffered a fracture of the index finger on his left foot, three weeks before the bout, and called for a rematch with Tsubakihara. Tsubakihara agreed to an immediate rematch.

The rematch between Tsubakihara and Egawa was scheduled as the main event of K-1: K'Festa 4 Day 1, with Egawa's K-1 Featherweight title on the line. At the time the bout was scheduled, Tsubakihara and Egawa were considered the #2 and #3 ranked fighters under 58 kg in the world, respectively. The fight itself was closely contested, with two of the three judges scoring it 29-29 and 30–30 at the end of the first three rounds, and the third judge scoring it 30-29 for Tsubakihara. Accordingly, the fight went into an extra round, after which Tsubakihara won by split decision.

Tsubakihara came under criticism for his outfighting style, perceived as boring by the fans, who called for a change in the K-1 ruleset to make for more exciting fights. K-1 later tweaked the ruleset, rewarding strikes with fight-ending intent more than point-scoring strikes.

==== K-1 Featherweight title reign ====
Tsubakihara was scheduled to fight Shuhei Kumura in a non-title bout at K-1 World GP 2021: Japan Bantamweight Tournament. Tsubakihara won the fight by unanimous decision, with the judges scoring the fight 30－29, 30－28 and 30－29 in his favor.

Tsubakihara was scheduled to make his first K-1 Featherweight title defense against the former two-time Krush Super Bantamweight title challenger Taito Gunji at K-1 World GP 2021 Japan on December 4, 2021. Tsubakihara and Gunji fought four times previously, with each holding a single win and loss against the other as amateurs and professionals. Tsubakihara lost the fight by split decision. The fight was ruled a split draw after the first three rounds were contested, with one judge each awarding Tsubakihara and Taito a 30-29 scorecard respectively, while the third judge scored it a 30–30 draw. The judges were once again split after an extra round was fought, with one judge scoring it 10-9 for Tsubakihara, while the remaining two judges scored it 10-9 for Taito.

==== Post title reign ====
Tsubakihara faced the Krush Featherweight champion Takahito Niimi at K-1: K'Festa 5 on April 3, 2022. He won the fight by unanimous decision. Two of the judges scored the bout 30–29 in his favor, while the third judge awarded him a 30–28 scorecard.

Tsubakihara faced the one-time Krush featherweight title challenger Toma Tanabe in the quarterfinals of the 2022 K-1 Featherweight World Grand Prix at K-1 World GP 2022 in Fukuoka on August 11, 2022. He lost the fight by a narrow majority decision. Two of the judges scored the fight 30–29 for Tanabe, while the remaining judge scored it as an even 30–30 draw.

Tsubakihara faced Shoki Kaneda at K-1 World GP 2022 in Osaka on December 3, 2022. He lost the fight by unanimous decision, with all three judges scoring the fight 30–26 for Kaneda. Tsubakihara was knocked down with a left hook in the second round, which led to all three judges scoring the round 10–8 for Kaneda.

Tsubakihara faced the reigning Krush Featherweight (-57.5kg) champion Riku Morisaka at K-1 World GP 2023 in Yokohama on June 3, 2023. The bout was a rematch five years in the making, as Tsubakihara had previously overcome Morisaka by unanimous decision at KHAOS 5. He won the fight by unanimous decision, with two scorecards of 30–28 and one scorecard of 30–29.

Tsubakihara faced Kensuke at K-1 ReBIRTH 2 on December 9, 2023. He won the fight by unanimous decision, with all three judges scoring the fight 30–29 in his favor.

Tsubakihara faced Shuhei Kumura at K-1 World GP 2024 in Osaka on October 5, 2024. He lost the fight by split decision, with one scorecard of 30–29 for him and two scorecards of 30–28 for Kumura.

== Championships and accomplishments ==
=== Professional ===
- K-1
  - 2021 K-1 World GP Featherweight (-57.5 kg) Championship

=== Amateur ===
- Kyoken Junior Kick
  - 2012 Kyoken Junior Kick Middleweight Championship (3 Defenses)
- K-1
  - 2015 K-1 Challenge A-Class Super Featherweight (-60 kg) Tournament Winner
  - 2015 K-1 Koshien Super Bantamweight (‐55 kg) Tournament Runner-up
  - 2016 K-1 Koshien Super Bantamweight (‐55 kg) Tournament Runner-up
  - 2017 K-1 Koshien Super Bantamweight (‐55 kg) Tournament Winner

=== Awards ===
- K-1
  - 2017 K-1 Awards Rookie of the Year
  - 2020 K-1 Awards Outstanding Performance Award
  - 2021 K-1 Awards Fighting Spirit Award
- Combat Press
  - 2020 Combat Press Upset of the Year vs. Yuki Egawa

== Kickboxing record ==
Kickboxing record
16 Wins (3 (T)KO's), 9 Losses, 1 Draw, 0 No Contest
| Date | Result | Opponent | Event | Location | Method | Round | Time |
| 2026-11-08 | Loss | (China) Saliman Aobulihairi | Kunlun Fight 109 | Hotan, China | Decision (Unanimous) | 3 | 3:00 |
| 2026-05-02 | Loss | (Japan) Raita Hashimoto | Krush.189 | Tokyo, Japan | Ext.R Decision (Split) | 4 | 3:00 |
| 2024-10-05 | Loss | (Japan) Shuhei Kumura | K-1 World GP 2024 in Osaka | Osaka, Japan | Decision (Split) | 3 | 3:00 |
| 2024-07-20 | Win | (China) Jia Mengqiang | Extreme Fighting competition 7 | Changsha, China | Ext.R Decision (Split) | 4 | 3:00 |
| 2023-12-09 | Win | (Japan) Kensuke | K-1 ReBIRTH 2 | Osaka, Japan | Decision (Unanimous) | 3 | 3:00 |
| 2023-06-03 | Win | (Japan) Riku Morisaka | K-1 World GP 2023: inaugural Middleweight Championship Tournament | Yokohama, Japan | Decision (Unanimous) | 3 | 3:00 |
| 2022-12-03 | Loss | (Japan) Shoki Kaneda | K-1 World GP 2022 in Osaka | Osaka, Japan | Decision (Unanimous) | 3 | 3:00 |
| 2022-08-11 | Loss | (Japan) Toma Tanabe | K-1 World GP 2022 in Fukuoka, Tournament Quarterfinals | Fukuoka, Japan | Decision (Majority) | 3 | 3:00 |
| 2022-04-03 | Win | (Japan) Takahito Niimi | K-1: K'Festa 5 | Tokyo, Japan | Decision (Unanimous) | 3 | 3:00 |
| 2021-12-04 | Loss | (Japan) Taito Gunji | K-1 World GP 2021 in Osaka | Osaka, Japan | Ext.R Decision (Split) | 4 | 3:00 |
Loses the K-1 Featherweight title.
| 2021-05-23 | Win | (Japan) Shuhei Kumura | K-1 World GP 2021: Japan Bantamweight Tournament | Tokyo, Japan | Decision (Unanimous) | 3 | 3:00 |
| 2021-03-21 | Win | (Japan) Yuki Egawa | K-1: K'Festa 4 Day 1 | Tokyo, Japan | Ext.R Decision (Split) | 4 | 3:00 |
Wins the K-1 Featherweight title.
| 2020-09-22 | Win | (Japan) Yuki Egawa | K-1 World GP 2020 in Osaka | Osaka, Japan | Decision (Majority) | 3 | 3:00 |
| 2020-06-28 | Win | (Japan) Shoya Masumoto | Krush 114 | Tokyo, Japan | KO (High Kick) | 3 | 2:02 |
| 2019-11-18 | Win | (Japan) Yuto Kuroda | Krush.108 | Osaka, Japan | Decision (Unanimous) | 3 | 3:00 |
| 2019-08-24 | Loss | (Japan) Aoshi | K-1 World GP 2019: Japan vs World 5 vs 5 & Special Superfight in Osaka | Osaka, Japan | Decision (Majority) | 3 | 3:00 |
| 2019-04-19 | Win | (Japan) Ryuto | Krush.100 | Tokyo, Japan | Decision (Majority) | 3 | 3:00 |
| 2018-12-16 | Loss | (Japan) Taito Gunji | Krush.96, Tournament Semifinal | Tokyo, Japan | Ext.R Decision (Split) | 4 | 3:00 |
| 2018-09-30 | Win | (Japan) Yusho Kanemoto | Krush.93, Tournament Quarterfinal | Tokyo, Japan | TKO (Punches) | 2 | 2:44 |
| 2018-05-26 | Win | (Japan) Riku Morisaka | KHAOS.5 | Tokyo, Japan | Decision (Unanimous) | 3 | 3:00 |
| 2018-03-10 | Loss | (Japan) Masashi Kumura | Krush.86 | Tokyo, Japan | Decision (Unanimous) | 3 | 3:00 |
| 2017-12-27 | Win | (Japan) Haruma Saikyo | K-1 Survival Wars | Tokyo, Japan | Decision (Majority) | 3 | 3:00 |
| 2017-05-13 | Win | (Japan) Taito Gunji | KHAOS.2 | Tokyo, Japan | Decision (Majority) | 3 | 3:00 |
| 2017-03-05 | Win | (Japan) Jin Mandokoro | Hoost Cup Kings Kyoto 2 | Kyoto, Japan | Decision (Unanimous) | 3 | 3:00 |
| 2016-11-27 | Win | (Japan) Tatsuya Izumi | ALL BOX WORLD 9th | Osaka, Japan | TKO (Flying Knee) | 2 | 0:39 |
| 2016-05-22 | Draw | (Japan) Yuki Tanioka | HIGHSPEED EX | Osaka, Japan | Decision | 3 | 3:00 |
Legend: Win Loss Draw/No contest Notes

=== Amateur record ===
Amateur Kickboxing Record
| Date | Result | Opponent | Event | Location | Method | Round | Time |
|---|---|---|---|---|---|---|---|
| 2017-11-23 | Win | (Japan) Itsuki Kobori | K-1 World GP 2017, K-1 Koshien 2017 Tournament Final | Tokyo, Japan | Decision (Unanimous) | 3 | 2:00 |
Wins the 2017 Koshien -55kg title.
| 2017-07-29 | Win | (Japan) Toki Tamaru | K-1 Koshien 2017 Tournament Semi Final | Tokyo, Japan | Ext.R Decision (Majority) | 2 | 2:00 |
| 2017-07-29 | Win | (Japan) Toma Kunimatsu | K-1 Koshien 2017 Tournament Quarter Final | Tokyo, Japan | Decision (Unanimous) | 1 | 2:00 |
| 2017-07-29 | Win | (Japan) Daiki Mine | K-1 Koshien 2017 Tournament Second Round | Tokyo, Japan | Ext.R Decision (Unanimous) | 2 | 2:00 |
| 2016-11-03 | Loss | (Japan) Taito Gunji | K-1 World GP 2016, K-1 Koshien 2016 Tournament, Final | Tokyo, Japan | Decision (Unanimous) | 3 | 2:00 |
For the 2016 Koshien -55kg title.
| 2016-07-30 | Win | (Japan) Yuta Hayashi | K-1 Koshien 2016 Tournament, Semi Final | Tokyo, Japan | Ext.R Decision (Decision) | 2 | 2:00 |
| 2016-07-30 | Win | (Japan) Souta Saito | K-1 Koshien 2016 Tournament, Quarter Final | Tokyo, Japan | KO | 1 | |
| 2016-07-30 | Win | (Japan) Kaito Nagashima | K-1 Koshien 2016 Tournament, Second Round | Tokyo, Japan | Decision (Unanimous) | 1 | 2:00 |
| 2015-11-21 | Loss | (Japan) Haruma Saikyo | K-1 World GP 2015 The Championship, K-1 Koshien Tournament Final | Tokyo, Japan | Decision (Split) | 3 | 2:00 |
For the 2015 Koshien -55kg title.
| 2015-08-15 | Win | (Japan) Taito Gunji | K-1 Koshien 2015 Tournament Semi Final | Tokyo, Japan | 2nd Ext.R Decision (Split) | 3 | 2:00 |
| 2015-08-15 | Win | (Japan) Reiji Kasami | K-1 Koshien 2015 Tournament Quarter Final | Tokyo, Japan | KO | 1 | |
| 2015-08-15 | Win | (Japan) Naoki Takahashi | K-1 Koshien 2015 Tournament Second Round | Tokyo, Japan | Ext.R Decision (Unanimous) | 2 | 2:00 |
| 2015-06-21 | Win | (Japan) Tsubasa Okamoto | K-1 Challenge A-Class -60 kg Tournament, Final | Tokyo, Japan | Decision (Majority) | 2 | 2:00 |
Wins K-1 Challenge A-Class -60kg Tournament.
| 2015-06-21 | Win | (Japan) Ruka Oonuki | K-1 Challenge A-Class -60 kg Tournament, Semi Final | Tokyo, Japan | Decision (Unanimous) | 2 | 2:00 |
| 2015-06-21 | Win | (Japan) Akito Watanabe | K-1 Challenge A-Class -60 kg Tournament, Quarter Final | Tokyo, Japan | Decision (Unanimous) | 2 | 2:00 |
| 2013-03-17 | Win | (Japan) Taiga Imanaga | Kyoken Jr Kick 7 | Osaka, Japan | Decision (Unanimous) | 2 | 2:00 |
Defends KJC Jr Middleweight title.
| 2013-01-20 | Win | (Japan) Taiga Imanaga | Kyoken Jr Kick 6 | Osaka, Japan | Ex.R Decision (Split) | 3 | 2:00 |
Defends KJC Jr Middleweight title.
| 2012-11-18 | Win | (Japan) Taiga Imanaga | Kyoken Jr Kick | Osaka, Japan | Ex.R Decision (Split) | 3 | 2:00 |
Defends Kyoken Junior Kick Jr Middleweight title.
| 2012-09-02 | Win | (Japan) Taiki Kiyama | Kyoken Jr Kick, Final | Osaka, Japan | Decision | 2 | 2:00 |
Wins Kyoken Junior Kick Jr Middleweight title.
| 2012-09-02 | Win | (Japan) Taiga Imanaga | Kyoken Jr Kick, Semi Final | Osaka, Japan | Decision (Split) | 2 | 2:00 |
| 2012-05-20 | Win | (Japan) Ryo Takahata | Kyoken Jr Kick 2 | Osaka, Japan | KO | | |
| 2012-03-11 | Win | (Japan) Hokuto Koyama | Kyoken Jr Kick 1 | Osaka, Japan | KO | 2 | |
| 2011-07-24 | Win | (Japan) Yoshiho Tane | KAKUMEI KICKBOXING | Osaka, Japan | Decision (Uannimous) | 3 | 1:30 |
Legend: Win Loss Draw/No contest Notes

== See also ==
- List of male kickboxers
- List of K-1 champions
