= Toma Tanabe =

Japanese kickboxer

Toma
- Born: Toma Tanabe; October 27, 2002 (age 23); Kyoto, Japan
- Native name: 田辺 斗麗
- Height: 171 cm (5 ft 7 in)
- Weight: 57.5 kg (127 lb; 9.05 st)
- Division: Featherweight
- Style: Kickboxing
- Stance: Orthodox
- Fighting out of: Kyoto, Japan
- Team: Wizard Kickboxing Gym
- Years active: 2018 - present

Kickboxing record
- Total: 23
- Wins: 17
- By knockout: 7
- Losses: 6
- By knockout: 2

Toma Tanabe (born 27 October 2002), better known as Toma (斗麗), is a Japanese kickboxer, currently competing in the featherweight division of K-1. He is a one-time Krush Featherweight title challenger.

Between July 2021 and January 2024 he was ranked as one of ten best super flyweight kickboxers in the world by Combat Press.

== Kickboxing career ==
Tanabe made his professional debut against Rikiya Yamaura at Krush 96 on December 16, 2018. He won the fight by unanimous decision, with all three judges awarding him a 28-25 scorecard.

Tababe made his second appearance with the promotion against Genki Adachi at Krush 99 on March 30, 2019. He won the fight by a third-round knockout, landing a left hook at the very last second of the bout.

Tanabe was scheduled to fight the future Krush Featherweight champion Takahito Niimi at K-1 World GP 2019: Japan vs World 5 vs 5 & Special Superfight in Osaka on August 24, 2019. He won the fight by unanimous decision, with all three judges scoring the bout as 30–28.

Tanabe was scheduled to face Tetsuji Noda at K-1 World GP 2019 Yokohamatsuri on November 24, 2019. Tanabe proved to be the better fighter throughout the first two rounds, and scored the only knockdown of the fight in the second round, landing a well placed knee to the jaw of TETSU. Although Tanabe was deducted a point in the third round for excessive clinching, he nonetheless did enough to be awarded a unanimous decision, with scores of 29–26, 29-26 and 29–26.

Tanabe was scheduled to fight Namito Izawa at Krush 112 on March 28, 2020. He won the fight by a first-round technical knockout, scoring three knockdowns inside of the round. The first knockdown came from a short jab, which caught Izawa posted on his right leg, with his left being raised to check a kick. The second knockdown was a result of a left straight. Izawa was knocked down for the third and final time with a left hook.

Tanabe was scheduled to face Kodai Inatsu at Krush 120 on December 19, 2020. He won the fight by a first-round technical knockout, due to the three knockdown rule. The first and third knockdowns came from a knee strike, while the second knockdown was a result of a left straight.

Tanabe initially scheduled to face Riku Morisaka, in the quarterfinals of the Krush Featherweight tournament, at Krush 117 on September 26, 2020. He was later replaced by Rikiya Yamaura, as his Kienböck's disease flared up and rendered him unable to compete.

Tanabe challenged Takahito Niimi for the Krush Featherweight title at Krush 122 on February 27, 2021. Niimi was the better fighter in the rematch, winning the fight by majority decision, with scores of 30–28, 29-28 and 28-28.

Three months later, Tanabe fought Yusho Kamemoto at K-1 World GP 2021: Japan Bantamweight Tournament on May 29, 2021. He won the fight by unanimous decision, with scores of 30–28, 30-28 and 30–29.

Tanabe was scheduled to face Tatsuki Shinotsuka at K-1 World GP 2021: Yokohamatsuri on September 20, 2021. Tanabe was rescheduled to fight Yusuke at the same event, as Shinotsuka withdrew from the bout with an injury. Toma knocked Yusuke down in both the first and second rounds, before finishing him with a left straight at the 2:05 minute mark of the second round.

Tanabe was scheduled to face Riku Morisaka at K-1 World GP 2021 in Osaka on December 4, 2021. He won the fight by unanimous decision.

Tanabe faced the K-1 Featherweight champion Taito Gunji at K-1: K'Festa 5 on April 3, 2022. The initial result of the bout was a draw, an extra round was fought which Toma lost by unanimous decision.

Tanabe faced the former K-1 featherweight champion Tatsuya Tsubakihara in the quarterfinals of the 2022 K-1 Featherweight World Grand Prix at K-1 World GP 2022 in Fukuoka on August 11, 2022. He won the fight by a close majority decision, with two judges awarding him a 30–29 scorecard, while the third judge saw the fight as an even 30–30 draw. Tanabe advanced to the semifinals, where he faced Wang Junguang. He won the fight by a dominant unanimous decision, with all of the judges awarding him every single round of the bout. He came up short in the finals however, as he lost to Taito Gunji by a first-round technical knockout.

Tanabe faced the Krush featherweight champion Shuhei Kumura at K-1 World GP 2022 in Osaka on December 3, 2022. He won the fight by unanimous decision, with two scorecards of 30–25 and one scorecard of 30–26. Tanabe knocked Kumura down with a right straight-left hook combination in the first round and a right straight in the second round.

Tanabe faced Haruto Yasumoto at K-1 World GP 2023: K'Festa 6 on March 12, 2023. He lost the fight by unanimous decision, with scores of 30–29, 30–29 and 29–28.

Tanabe faced View Petchkoson at K-1 World GP 2023 on July 17, 2023. He won the fight by a third-round technical knockout, with just three seconds left in the bout.

Tanabe faced Kyo Kawakami at K-1 ReBIRTH 2 on December 9, 2023. He lost the fight by unanimous decision, with all three judges awarding Kawakami a 30–28 scorecard.

Toma faced Shoki Kaneda at K-1 World GP 2024 in Osaka on October 5, 2024. He lost the fight by a first-round knockout.

Toma faced Raita Hashimoto at K-1 World MAX 2025 - 70kg World Championship Tournament Final on November 15, 2025. He won the fight by unanimous decision after an extension round was contested.

== Titles and accomplishments ==
Professional

- K-1
  - 2022 K-1 Featherweight World Grand Prix Tournament Runner-up
- International Sport Kickboxing Association
  - 2025 ISKA K-1 World Featherweight (-57.5 kg) Champion

Amateur

- 2015 Green Boy Super Welterweight Champion
- 2015 TOP RUN -50 kg Champion

== Kickboxing record ==
Kickboxing record
17 Wins (7 (T)KO's), 6 Losses, 0 Draw, 0 No Contest
Date	Result	Opponent	Event	Location	Method	Round	Time
2026-11-23		(Japan) Ryota Ishida	K-1 Revenge II	Tokyo, Japan			
2026-09-26	Win	(Japan) Chihiro Nakajima	Krush 192	Tokyo, Japan	KO (left cross)	2	2:03
2026-05-10	Win	(Morocco) Hamada Azmani	NOVA	Kyoto, Japan	KO (right cross)	1	0:53
Wins the ISKA K-1 World Featherweight (-57kg) title.
2026-02-01	Win	(Japan) Takeru Owaki	Krush 185	Osaka, Japan	Decision (unanimous)	3	3:00
2025-11-15	Win	(Japan) Raita Hashimoto	K-1 World MAX 2025 - 70kg World Championship Tournament Final	Yokohama, Japan	Ext.R Decision (unanimous)	4	3:00
2024-10-05	Loss	(Japan) Shoki Kaneda	K-1 World GP 2024 in Osaka	Osaka, Japan	KO (left hook)	1	1:11
2023-12-09	Loss	(Japan) Kyo Kawakami	K-1 ReBIRTH 2	Osaka, Japan	Decision (unanimous)	3	3:00
2023-07-17	Win	(Thailand) View Petchkoson	K-1 World GP 2023	Tokyo, Japan	TKO (referee stoppage)	3	2:52
2023-03-12	Loss	(Japan) Haruto Yasumoto	K-1 World GP 2023: K'Festa 6	Tokyo, Japan	Decision (unanimous)	3	3:00
2022-12-03	Win	(Japan) Shuhei Kumura	K-1 World GP 2022 in Osaka	Osaka, Japan	Decision (unanimous)	3	3:00
2022-08-11	Loss	(Japan) Taito Gunji	K-1 World GP 2022 in Fukuoka, Tournament Finals	Fukuoka, Japan	TKO (3 knockdowns)	1	2:57
For the K-1 Featherweight World Grand Prix title.
2022-08-11	Win	(China) Wang Junguang	K-1 World GP 2022 in Fukuoka, Tournament Semifinals	Fukuoka, Japan	Decision (unanimous)	3	3:00
2022-08-11	Win	(Japan) Tatsuya Tsubakihara	K-1 World GP 2022 in Fukuoka, Tournament Quarterfinals	Fukuoka, Japan	Decision (majority)	3	3:00
2022-04-03	Loss	(Japan) Taito Gunji	K-1: K'Festa 5	Tokyo, Japan	Ext.R Decision (unanimous)	4	3:00
2021-12-04	Win	(Japan) Riku Morisaka	K-1 World GP 2021 in Osaka	Osaka, Japan	Decision (unanimous)	3	3:00
2021-09-20	Win	(Japan) Yusuke	K-1 World GP 2021: Yokohamatsuri	Yokohama, Japan	KO (left straight)	2	2:05
2021-05-30	Win	(Japan) Yusho Kanemoto	K-1 World GP 2021: Japan Bantamweight Tournament	Tokyo, Japan	Decision (unanimous)	3	3:00
2021-02-27	Loss	(Japan) Takahito Niimi	Krush 122	Tokyo, Japan	Decision (majority)	3	3:00
For the Krush Featherweight (-57.5kg) title.
2020-12-19	Win	(Japan) Kodai Inatsu	Krush.120	Tokyo, Japan	TKO (3 knockdowns)	1	2:42
2020-03-28	Win	(Japan) Namito Izawa	Krush.112	Tokyo, Japan	TKO (3 knockdowns)	1	2:48
2019-11-24	Win	(Japan) Tetsuji Noda	K-1 World GP 2019 Yokohamatsuri	Yokohama, Japan	Decision (unanimous)	3	3:00
2019-08-24	Win	(Japan) Takahito Niimi	K-1 World GP 2019: Japan vs World 5 vs 5 & Special Superfight in Osaka	Osaka, Japan	Decision (unanimous)	3	3:00
2019-03-30	Win	(Japan) Genki Adachi	Krush.99	Tokyo, Japan	KO (knees and punches)	3	2:59
2018-12-16	Win	(Japan) Rikiya Yamaura	Krush.96	Tokyo, Japan	Decision (unanimous)	3	3:00
Legend: Win Loss Draw/No contest Notes

=== Amateur record ===
Amateur Kickboxing Record
Date	Result	Opponent	Event	Location	Method	Round	Time
2018-07-01	Win	(Netherlands)		Netherlands	Decision (unanimous)		
2017-04-30	Draw	(Japan) Shuta Shima	NEXT☆LEVEL 38	Osaka, Japan	Decision	2	2:00
2017-02-15	Win	(Japan) Haruji Morishita	Amateur HIGHSPEED 2	Osaka, Japan	KO (2 knockdowns)	2	0:56
2016-06-05	Win	(Japan) Shinnosuke Hatsuda	HOOST CUP KINGS KYOTO	Kyoto, Japan	Decision (unanimous)	2	2:00
2016-03-21	NC	(Japan) Teruku Maezono	DEEP KICK 29	Osaka, Japan	Doctor stoppage	2	0:39
For the TOP RUN -50kg title.
2016-01-31	Win	(Japan) Junya Jouichi	NEXT LEVEL Kansai 27	Sakai, Japan	Decision (unanimous)	2	2:00
2016-01-31	Win	(Japan) Kazumasa Saito	NEXT LEVEL Kansai 27	Sakai, Japan	KO	1	
2015-07-26	Win	(Japan)	Green Boy Fight 9, Final	Kyoto, Japan	Decision	2	2:00
Wins Green Boy Fight Super Welterweight title.
2015-03	Win	(Japan) Ayano Oohara		Japan	KO		
2015-03	Win	(Japan) Shuta Momo		Japan	KO		
2014-12-07	Win	(Japan)	Aerodynamite Kickboxing	Kyoto, Japan	Decision (unanimous)	2	2:00
2014-08-03	Win	(Japan) Ren Shibata	Green Boy Super Fight	Kyoto, Japan	Decision (split)	2	1:30
2013-11-04	Win	(Japan) Kanta Nishimura	Muay Thai WINDY Super Fight vol.15 in KYOTO	Kyoto, Japan	KO	1	
2013-09-22	Win	(Japan) Ren Shibata		Osaka, Japan	Decision	2	2:00
Legend: Win Loss Draw/No contest Notes

== See also ==
- List of male kickboxers
