= Taito Gunji =

Japanese kickboxer (born 1999)

- Born: January 17, 1999 (age 27); Itabashi, Tokyo, Japan
- Other names: Rebellious Son
- Height: 167 cm (5 ft 6 in)
- Weight: 57.5 kg (127 lb; 9.05 st)
- Division: Flyweight
- Style: Kickboxing
- Stance: Orthodox
- Fighting out of: Tokyo, Japan
- Team: Team Suerte (2025 - Present); K-1 Gym Team Pegasus (2014 - 2025)
- Years active: 2015 - present

Kickboxing record
- Total: 40
- Wins: 31
- By knockout: 8
- Losses: 8
- By knockout: 1
- Draws: 1

Other information
- Website: https://taito-gunji.com/

Taito Gunji (Japanese: 軍司 泰斗, Taito Gunji; born January 17, 1999) is a Japanese kickboxer, currently competing in the featherweight division of K-1. He is the former featherweight champion. A professional competitor since 2015, Gunji is the 2022 K-1 Featherweight World Grand Prix winner, the former Krush Bantamweight champion, and a two-time Krush Super Bantamweight title challenger.

As of January 2023, he is ranked as the best bantamweight (-58 kg) and ninth best pound for pound kickboxer in the world by Beyond Kick and the best super flyweight (-58 kg) and tenth best pound for pound kickboxer by Combat Press, who have ranked him in the top ten since August 2021.

== Kickboxing career ==
=== Amateur career ===
Gunji made his kickboxing debut by participating in the 2014 K-1 Challenge B-Class tournament. He won the two-minute quarterfinal and semifinal bouts against Tatsuki Kitayama and Koki by decision, and faced Akihiro Kaneko in the finals. He beat Kaneko by decision.

Two months later, Gunji took part in the 2014 K-1 Challenge A-Class tournament, and faced Natsuki Mizukoshi in the semifinals. He beat Mizukoshi by decision, and took on Masahiro Osawa in the finals. Gunji beat Osawa in the same manner, winning by decision.

On August 15, 2015, Gunji entered the K-1 Koshien tournament, open to highschool aged kickboxers. He beat Takumi Naito by unanimous decision in the second round and Issei Ichiki by majority decision in the quarterfinals. Gunji lost to Tatsuya Tsubakihara in the semifinals by split decision, after two additional rounds were contested.

A year later, on July 30, 2016, Gunji participated in the 2016 K-1 Koshien tournament. He beat Kouka Minowa by unanimous decision in the second round, and notched knockouts of Shizuma Nakashima and Issei Ichiki in the quarterfinal and semifinal respectively. Gunji fought a rematch with Tatsuya Tsubakihara in the tournament finals, winning by unanimous decision.

=== Bantamweight career ===
==== Early career ====
Gunji made his professional debut against Katsuhiro at Krush 51 on February 6, 2015. He won the bout by majority decision, with scores of 29-29, 30-29 and 29-28. Gunji was then scheduled to face Takuya Suzuki at Krush 54 on May 4, 2015. The fight ended in a majority draw, with two of the judges scoring the fight 29-29, while the third judge scored it 30-28 for Gunji. Gunji faced Yoshiki at Krush 60 on November 14, 2015. He won the fight by a first-round knockout, dropping his opponent with a head kick mid-way through the round.

Gunji was scheduled to fight the future pound for pound great Yoshiki Takei at Krush 63 on February 5, 2016. Takei won by unanimous decision, with all three judges scoring the fight 28-27 for him, thus handing Gunji his first professional loss.

Gunji rebounded from this loss with two consecutive stoppage victories. He first beat Hiroto Ishitsuka by a first-round knockout at Krush 66 on June 12, 2016. This was followed by a first-round knockout of Reiji Kasami at Krush 72 on January 15, 2017. Gunji extended his winning streak to three fights with a unanimous decision victory against Taisuke Degai at Krush 74 on March 3, 2017.

Gunji was scheduled to face Tatsuya Tsubakihara for the third time in his career at KHAOS 2 on May 13, 2017. They had met twice previously, as amateurs, with each winning a decision. Tsubakihara won their first professional meeting by majority decision, with scores of 30-29, 29-29 and 30-29.

==== Krush Bantamweight champion ====
Gunji was scheduled to fight Ryusei for the vacant Krush Bantamweight title at Krush 80 on September 8, 2017. Gunji throughouly dominated Ryusei, knocking him down twice in the first round and once in the second round. He won the fight by a wide unanimous decision, with all three judges scoring the fight 30-24 in his favor.

Gunji was scheduled to fight Shota Oiwa at K-1 SURVIVAL WARS 2017 on December 27, 2017. He won the fight by unanimous decision, knocking Oiwa down twice in the first round, with scores of 30-27, 29-26 and 30-26. He fought another non-title bout against Takumi Tosaka at K-1: K'FESTA.1 on March 21, 2018. He won the fight by unanimous decision.

Gunji made his first title defense against Akihiro Kaneko in the co-main event of Krush 89 on June 30, 2018. The fight was ruled a draw after the first three round. Accordingly, an extension round was fought, after which Kaneko was awarded a unanimous decision.

=== Super Bantamweight career ===
==== Krush Super Bantamweight tournament ====
After losing his title, Gunji moved up from bantamweight (-53 kg) to super bantamweight (-55 kg). He was scheduled to face Riku Morisaka at Krush 93 on September 30, 2018, in the quarterfinals of the Krush Super Bantamweight tournament. He beat Morisaka by majority decision, with two of the judges scoring the fight 30-28 for Gunji, while the third judge scored it 30-30.

Advancing to the semifinals of the tournament, Gunji faced Tatsuya Tsubakihara for the fourth time in his career at Krush 96 on December 16, 2018. Tsubakihara had won their sole professional meeting by majority decision. Gunji won the closely contested bout by split decision, after an extra round was fought.

Gunji met the undefeated Masashi Kumura in the tournament finals, held at Krush 98 on February 16, 2019. Kumura won the fight by unanimous decision, with scores of 30-29, 30-29 and 30-28. Gunji suffered a broken jaw during the bout, which forced him out of competition for the next ten months.

==== Second title run ====
Gunji was scheduled to fight Masashi's brother Shuhei Kumura in the co-main event of Krush 106 on October 13, 2019. Gunji won the fight by unanimous decision.

Gunji faced Suriyanlek Aor.Bor.Tor. Kampee in the co-main event of Krush 111 on February 24, 2020. He won the fight by unanimous decision, scoring a single knockdown in the third round.

His two fight winning streak earned Gunji the right to challenge the reigning Krush Super bantamweight champion Masashi Kumura, at Krush 117 on September 26, 2020. They previously fought at Krush 98, with Kumura winning by unanimous decision. Kumura won the rematch by unanimous decision, scoring a single knockdown in the third round with a well placed knee to the head of Gunji, as the latter was ducking out of an exchange.

He was ranked in the Combat Press flyweight (-56.7 kg) top ten between September 2020, when he peaked at #5, until March 2021, when he moved up in weight. Combat Press previously ranked him in their strawweight top ten between May and December 2019, peaking at #6 in May and June.

=== Featherweight career ===
==== Early featherweight career ====
Following his second failed title bid, Gunji moved up from super bantamweight (-55 kg) to featherweight (-57.5 kg). He was scheduled to make his divisional debut against Yusho Kamemoto at K-1 World GP 2020 Winter's Crucial Bout on December 13, 2020. Gunji won the fight by a second-round knockout. He scored the first knockdown of the fight at the 1:32 minute mark of the second round, dropping his opponent with a right straight-left hook combination. Although Kamemoto was able to beat the eight-count, he was quickly knocked down again with a left hook, prompting the referee to stop the fight.

Gunji was scheduled to face Riku Morisaka in a rematch at K-1: K'Festa 4 Day 1 on March 21, 2021. He won the fight by unanimous decision, with scores of 30-27, 30-26 and 30-26.

Gunji was scheduled to face the reigning Krush Featherweight champion Takahito Niimi at K-1 World GP 2021: Yokohamatsuri on September 20, 2021. Gunji won the fight by a comfortable unanimous decision, with two judges scoring the bout 30-29 in his favor, while the third judge awarded him all three rounds of the fight.

==== K-1 Featherweight champion ====
Gunji was scheduled to challenge the reigning K-1 Featherweight champion Tatsuya Tsubakihara at K-1 World GP 2021 Japan on December 4, 2021. Gunji and Tsubakihara had fought twice as amateurs and twice as professionals, with Gunji earning the victory on two occasions. Gunji won the fight by split decision, after an extra round was fought. The fight was scored a split draw after the first three rounds were fought, which meant an extension round would be contested. He edged Tsubakihara in another close round, with two of the three judges awarding him a 10-9 scorecard.

Gunji was booked to face Toma Tanabe in a non-title bout at K-1: K'Festa 5 on April 3, 2022. According to Gunji, he originally intended to defend his title against a foreign opponent, but accepted a non-title bout against Tanabe as foreign competitors weren't able to enter Japan due to the COVID-19 restrictions imposed by the Japanese government. At the weigh-ins, Gunji missed weight, but was able to make the featherweight limit in his second attempt. The fight was ruled a majority draw following the first three rounds, with two judges scoring it an even 30–30 and 29–29 draw, while the third judge scored it 30–29 for Toma. An extension round was therefore fought, after which Gunji was awarded the unanimous decision.

Gunji faced the WGP Kickboxing veteran, and the promotions former champion, Facu Suarez in the quarterfinals bout of the 2022 K-1 Featherweight World Grand Prix, which was held at K-1 World GP 2022 in Fukuoka on August 11, 2022. Despite a slow start to the fight, which saw one of the judges score the opening round as a draw, Gunji would go on to dominate the remaining two rounds en-route to winning the bout by unanimous decision. Two judges scored the fight 30–27 for him, while the third judge scored the fight 30–28 in his favor. Gunji advanced to the penultimate bout of the one-day tournament, where he faced the reigning Krush Featherweight (-57.5kg) champion Shuhei Kumura, who earned his place in the semifinals with a second-round stoppage of Jawsuayai Sor.Dechaphan. Gunji won the fight by knockout, stopping Kumura with a right straight at the very last second of the first round. Advancing to the finals, Gunji faced Toma Tanabe, who he had beaten by an extra round decision on April 3, 2022. He won the rematch by a first-round technical knockout.

Gunji faced the 2022 K-1 featherweight Grand Prix semifinalist Wang Junguang at K-1 World GP 2022 in Osaka on December 3, 2022. He won the fight by a narrow majority decision. Two of the judges scored the bout 30–29 in his favor, while the third judge scored it as an even 29–29 draw.

Gunji made his first K-1 Featherweight title against View Petchkoson at K-1 World GP 2023: K'Festa 6 on March 12, 2023. He won the fight by majority decision, with two judges scoring the bout 30–29 in his favor, while the third judge scored it an even 30–30 draw.

Gunji faced Daosayam Wor.Wanchai in a non-title bout at K-1 World GP 2023 on July 17, 2023. He won the fight by a clear unanimous decision, with all three judges scoring the bout 30–27 in his favor.

Gunji faced the ISKA World Full Contact World Lightweight (-61 kg) champion Angelos Martinos at K-1 World GP 2023: ReBOOT～K-1 ReBIRTH～ on September 10, 2023. He won the fight by majority decision, with scores of 30–30, 30–29 and 30–29.

Gunji faced the RISE featherweight champion Keisuke Monguchi at K-1 World MAX 2024 - World Tournament Opening Round on March 20, 2024. He won the fight by split decision, after an extra fourth round was contested.

Gunji made his second K-1 Featherweight title against Takumi Terada at K-1 World MAX 2024 on September 29, 2024. He lost the fight by unanimous decision, after an extra fourth round was contested.

==== KNOCK OUT ====
Gunji faced Cristian Bogdan for the vacant ISKA Oriental rules Intercontinental Super-featherweight (-59 kg) title at the Japan Martial Arts Expo on October 19, 2024. He won the fight by unanimous decision.

On May 1, 2025, K-1 announced that Gunji's contract with the organization had come to an end.

On June 22, 2025, Gunji made his Muay Thai rules debut at "The Knock Out" against Petchrungruang Sor.Jaruwan He won the fight by first round knockout with a hook to the body.

Gunji faced Kaewkangwan Sor.Amnuwaidet at KNOCK OUT 56 on August 29, 2025. He lost the fight by first round knockout, being hit with a left elbow to the face.

Gunji faced Saensakgun Or.Kamin at KNOCK OUT 59 on November 15, 2025. He won the fight by unanimous decision. Following this victory, a rematch with Kaewkangwan Sor.Amnuwaidet took place at KNOCK OUT 60 on December 30, 2025. After the first three rounds were ruled a draw, an extra extension round was contested; Gunji ultimately lost the bout via unanimous decision.

== Titles and accomplishments ==
=== Professional ===
- Krush
  - 2017 Krush Bantamweight Champion
- K-1
  - 2021 K-1 World GP Featherweight (-57.5kg) Champion
    - One successful title defense
  - 2021 K-1 Outstanding Performance Award
  - 2022 K-1 Featherweight World Grand Prix Winner
  - 2022 K-1 Fighter of the Year
- International Sport Kickboxing Association
  - 2024 ISKA Oriental Rules Intercontinental Super-featherweight (59 kg) Champion

=== Amateur ===
- K-1
  - 2014 K-1 Challenge B-Class Super Bantamweight (-55 kg) Tournament Winner
  - 2014 K-1 Challenge A-Class Super Bantamweight (-55 kg) Tournament Winner
  - 2015 K-1 Koshien Super Bantamweight (-55 kg) Tournament Semi-finalist
  - 2016 K-1 Koshien Super Bantamweight (-55 kg) Tournament Winner

== Fight record ==
Professional Kickboxing and Muay Thai record
31 Wins (8 (T)KO's), 8 Losses, 1 Draw, 0 No Contest
| Date | Result | Opponent | Event | Location | Method | Round | Time |
| 2026-12-30 | | (Russia) Tagir Khalilov | KNOCK OUT.17 ～K.O CLIMAX 2026～ | Tokyo, Japan | | | |
| 2026-10-23 | Win | (Japan) Soichiro Arata | KNOCK OUT 69 | Tokyo, Japan | Decision (Unanimous) | 3 | 3:00 |
| 2026-07-05 | Win | (Japan) Ryoto Kimura | KNOCK OUT MX LIVE | Tamura, Japan | KO (Right cross) | 2 | 1:46 |
| 2026-05-28 | Win | (Japan) Yuki Kasahara | Kickboxing Fes. GOAT 2 | Tokyo, Japan | Decision (Unanimous) | 3 | 3:00 |
| 2025-12-30 | Loss | (Thailand) Kaewkangwan Sor.Amnuwaidet | KNOCK OUT 60 - K.O CLIMAX 2025 | Tokyo, Japan | Ext.R Decision (Unanimous) | 4 | 3:00 |
| 2025-11-15 | Win | (Thailand) Saensakgun Or.Kamin | KNOCK OUT 59 | Tokyo, Japan | Decision (Unanimous) | 3 | 3:00 |
| 2025-08-29 | Loss | (Thailand) Kaewkangwan Sor.Amnuwaidet | KNOCK OUT 56 | Tokyo, Japan | KO (Left elbow) | 1 | 2:32 |
| 2025-06-22 | Win | (Thailand) Petchrungruang Sor.Jaruwan | THE KNOCK OUT | Tokyo, Japan | KO (Left hook to the body) | 1 | 1:22 |
| 2024-10-19 | Win | (Romania) Cristian-Bogdan Lungu | Japan Martial Arts Expo | Yokohama, Japan | Decision (Unanimous) | 5 | 3:00 |
Wins the vacant ISKA Oriental rules Intercontinental Super-featherweight (-59kg) title.
| 2024-09-29 | Loss | (Japan) Takumi Terada | K-1 World MAX 2024 | Tokyo, Japan | Ext.R Decision (Unanimous) | 4 | 3:00 |
Loses the K-1 Featherweight (-57.5kg) title.
| 2024-03-20 | Win | (Japan) Keisuke Monguchi | K-1 World MAX 2024 - World Tournament Opening Round | Tokyo, Japan | Ext.R Decision (Split) | 4 | 3:00 |
| 2023-09-10 | Win | (Greece) Angelos Martinos | K-1 World GP 2023: ReBOOT～K-1 ReBIRTH～ | Yokohama, Japan | Decision (Majority) | 3 | 3:00 |
| 2023-07-17 | Win | (Thailand) Daosayam Wor.Wanchai | K-1 World GP 2023 | Tokyo, Japan | Decision (Unanimous) | 3 | 3:00 |
| 2023-03-12 | Win | (Thailand) View Petchkoson | K-1 World GP 2023: K'Festa 6 | Tokyo, Japan | Decision (Majority) | 3 | 3:00 |
Defends the K-1 Featherweight (-57.5kg) title.
| 2022-12-03 | Win | (China) Wang Junguang | K-1 World GP 2022 in Osaka | Osaka, Japan | Decision (Majority) | 3 | 3:00 |
| 2022-08-11 | Win | (Japan) Toma | K-1 World GP 2022 in Fukuoka, Tournament Finals | Fukuoka, Japan | TKO (Three knockdowns) | 1 | 2:57 |
Wins the 2022 K-1 Featherweight World Grand Prix.
| 2022-08-11 | Win | (Japan) Shuhei Kumura | K-1 World GP 2022 in Fukuoka, Tournament Semifinals | Fukuoka, Japan | KO (2 knockdown/Punch) | 1 | 3:00 |
| 2022-08-11 | Win | (Argentina) Facu Suarez | K-1 World GP 2022 in Fukuoka, Tournament Quarterfinals | Fukuoka, Japan | Decision (Unanimous) | 3 | 3:00 |
| 2022-04-03 | Win | (Japan) Toma | K-1: K'Festa 5 | Tokyo, Japan | Ext.R Decision (Unanimous) | 4 | 3:00 |
| 2021-12-04 | Win | (Japan) Tatsuya Tsubakihara | K-1 World GP 2021 in Osaka | Osaka, Japan | Ext.R Decision (Split) | 4 | 3:00 |
Wins the K-1 Featherweight (-57.5kg) title.
| 2021-09-20 | Win | (Japan) Takahito Niimi | K-1 World GP 2021: Yokohamatsuri | Yokohama, Japan | Decision (Unanimous) | 3 | 3:00 |
| 2021-03-21 | Win | (Japan) Riku Morisaka | K-1: K'Festa 4 Day 1 | Tokyo, Japan | Decision (Unanimous) | 3 | 3:00 |
| 2020-12-13 | Win | (Japan) Yusho Kamemoto | K-1 World GP 2020 Winter's Crucial Bout | Tokyo, Japan | KO (Punches) | 2 | 1:54 |
| 2020-09-26 | Loss | (Japan) Masashi Kumura | Krush.117 | Tokyo, Japan | Decision (Unanimous) | 3 | 3:00 |
For the Krush Super Bantamweight (-55kg) title.
| 2020-02-24 | Win | (Thailand) Suriyanlek Aor.Bor.Tor.Kampee | Krush.111 | Tokyo, Japan | Decision (Unanimous) | 3 | 3:00 |
| 2019-10-13 | Win | (Japan) Shuhei Kumura | Krush.106 | Tokyo, Japan | Decision (Unanimous) | 3 | 3:00 |
| 2019-02-16 | Loss | (Japan) Masashi Kumura | Krush.98, Tournament Finals | Tokyo, Japan | Decision (Unanimous) | 3 | 3:00 |
For the vacant Krush Super Bantamweight (-55kg) title.
| 2018-12-16 | Win | (Japan) Tatsuya Tsubakihara | Krush.96, Tournament Semifinals | Tokyo, Japan | Ext.R Decision (Split) | 4 | 3:00 |
| 2018-09-30 | Win | (Japan) Riku Morisaka | Krush.93, Tournament Quarterfinals | Tokyo, Japan | Decision (Majority) | 3 | 3:00 |
| 2018-06-30 | Loss | (Japan) Akihiro Kaneko | Krush.89 | Tokyo, Japan | Ext.R Decision (Unanimous) | 4 | 3:00 |
Loses the Krush Bantamweight (-53kg) title.
| 2018-03-21 | Win | (Japan) Takumi Tosaka | K-1 World GP 2018: K'FESTA.1 | Saitama, Japan | Decision (Unanimous) | 3 | 3:00 |
| 2017-12-27 | Win | (Japan) Shota Oiwa | K-1 WORLD GP 2017 JAPAN ～SURVIVAL WARS 2017～ | Tokyo, Japan | Decision (Unanimous) | 3 | 3:00 |
| 2017-09-08 | Win | (Japan) Ryusei | Krush.80 | Tokyo, Japan | Decision (Unanimous) | 3 | 3:00 |
Wins the Krush Bantamweight (-53kg) title.
| 2017-05-13 | Loss | (Japan) Tatsuya Tsubakihara | KHAOS.2 | Tokyo, Japan | Decision (Majority) | 3 | 3:00 |
| 2017-03-03 | Win | (Japan) Taisuke Degai | Krush.74 | Tokyo, Japan | Decision (Unanimous) | 3 | 3:00 |
| 2017-01-15 | Win | (Japan) Reiji Kasami | Krush.72 | Tokyo, Japan | KO (Left Hook to the Body) | 1 | 2:58 |
| 2016-06-12 | Win | (Japan) Hiroto Ishitsuka | Krush.66 | Tokyo, Japan | KO (Left Hook) | 1 | 2:05 |
| 2016-02-05 | Loss | (Japan) Yoshiki Takei | Krush.63 | Tokyo, Japan | Decision (Unanimous) | 3 | 3:00 |
| 2015-11-14 | Win | (Japan) Yoshiki | Krush.60 | Tokyo, Japan | KO (Right High Kick) | 1 | 1:28 |
| 2015-05-04 | Draw | (Japan) Takuya Suzuki | Krush.54 | Tokyo, Japan | Decision (Majority) | 3 | 3:00 |
| 2015-02-06 | Win | (Japan) Katsuhiro | Krush.51 | Tokyo, Japan | Decision (Majority) | 3 | 3:00 |
Legend: Win Loss Draw/No contest Notes

=== Amateur record ===
Amateur Kickboxing Record
| Date | Result | Opponent | Event | Location | Method | Round | Time |
|---|---|---|---|---|---|---|---|
| 2016-11-03 | Win | (Japan) Tatsuya Tsubakihara | K-1 World GP 2016 - K-1 Koshien 2016 Tournament, Final | Tokyo, Japan | Decision (Unanimous) | 3 | 2:00 |
Wins the 2016 Koshien -55kg Tournament title.
| 2016-07-30 | Win | (Japan) Issei Ichiki | K-1 Koshien 2016 Tournament, Semi Final | Tokyo, Japan | KO | | |
| 2016-07-30 | Win | (Japan) Shizuma Nakashima | K-1 Koshien 2016 Tournament, Quarter Final | Tokyo, Japan | KO | | |
| 2016-07-30 | Win | (Japan) Kouka Minowa | K-1 Koshien 2016 Tournament, Second Round | Tokyo, Japan | Decision (Unanimous) | 1 | 2:00 |
| 2015-08-15 | Loss | (Japan) Tatsuya Tsubakihara | K-1 Koshien 2015 Tournament Semi Final | Tokyo, Japan | 2nd Ext.R Decision (Split) | 3 | 2:00 |
| 2015-08-15 | Win | (Japan) Issei Ichiki | K-1 Koshien 2015 Tournament Quarter Final | Tokyo, Japan | Decision (Majority) | 1 | 2:00 |
| 2015-08-15 | Win | (Japan) Takumi Naito | K-1 Koshien 2015 Tournament Second Round | Tokyo, Japan | Decision (Unanimous) | 1 | 2:00 |
| 2014-12-07 | Win | (Japan) Masahiro Osawa | K-1 Challenge 2014 A-Class, Final | Tokyo, Japan | Decision | 3 | 2:00 |
Wins the 2014 K-1 Challenge A-Class Super Bantamweight (-55 kg) title.
| 2014-12-07 | Win | (Japan) Natsuki Mizukoshi | K-1 Challenge 2014 A-Class, Semi Final | Tokyo, Japan | Decision | 2 | 2:00 |
| 2014-10-19 | Win | (Japan) Akihiro Kaneko | K-1 Challenge 2014 B-Class, Final | Tokyo, Japan | Decision | 2 | 2:00 |
Wins the 2014 K-1 Challenge B-Class Super Bantamweight (-55 kg) title.
| 2014-10-19 | Win | (Japan) Koki | K-1 Challenge 2014 B-Class, Semi Final | Tokyo, Japan | Decision | 1 | 2:00 |
| 2014-10-19 | Win | (Japan) Tatsuki Kitayama | K-1 Challenge 2014 B-Class, Quarter Final | Tokyo, Japan | Decision | 1 | 2:00 |
Legend: Win Loss Draw/No contest Notes

== See also ==
- List of male kickboxers
- List of Krush champions
- List of K-1 champions
