= Takahito Niimi =

Japanese kickboxer (born 1993)

- Born: 新美 貴士; September 26, 1993 (age 33); Anjō, Japan
- Height: 171 cm (5 ft 7 in)
- Weight: 57.5 kg (127 lb; 9.05 st)
- Division: Super Flyweight
- Style: Kickboxing, Boxing
- Stance: Southpaw
- Fighting out of: Tokyo, Japan
- Team: Nagoya JK Factory
- Years active: 2018 - present

Kickboxing record
- Total: 34
- Wins: 19
- By knockout: 9
- Losses: 14
- By knockout: 0
- Draws: 1

Takahito Niimi (新美貴士, born 26 September 1993) is a Japanese kickboxer competing in the featherweight division of K-1/Krush. He is the former Krush Featherweight champion.

As of July 2021, he was the #3 ranked Super Flyweight in the world by Combat Press.

== Kickboxing career ==
=== Early career ===
Niimi made his professional debut against Sho Yamaguchi at HOOST CUP KINGS NAGOYA 4 - Kick Revolution on May 20, 2018. He won the fight by a first-round technical knockout. Niimi was scheduled to make his second professional appearance against TETSU at Krush.92 ～in NAGOYA～ on August 18, 2018. He won the fight by unanimous decision, with scores of 30-29, 30-28 and 30-28.

Niimi suffered his first professional loss against Ryuto Matsumoto at Suk Wanchai MuayThai Super Fight vol.5 on September 24, 2018, who won their bout by unanimous decision. Niimi rebounded by winning his next two fights against Takato and Yue Heng by stoppage.

==== Early K-1 career ====
Niimi was scheduled to face Rikiya Yamaura at KHAOS 8 on June 1, 2019. He won the fight by a third-round knockout, stopping Yamaura with repeated low kicks.

Niimi was scheduled to face Toma Tanabe at K-1 World GP 2019: Japan vs World 5 vs 5 & Special Superfight in Osaka on August 24, 2019. He lost the fight by unanimous decision, with all three judges scoring the fight 30-28 for Toma.

Niimi was scheduled to fight Tenma Sano at Krush 107 on November 8, 2019. He won the fight by majority decision, with scores of 29-29, 28-29 and 28-29.

For his sixth fight of the year, Niimi was scheduled to face Naoki Takahashi at K-1 World GP 2019 Japan: ～Women's Flyweight Championship Tournament～ on December 28, 2019. Niimi won the fight by unanimous decision.

His two-fight winning streak was snapped by Keito Okajima at Krush 114 on July 11, 2020, who their bout by unanimous decision.

=== Krush Featherweight champion ===
==== Krush Featherweight tournament ====
Niimi participated in the 2020 Krush Featherweight tournament, organized to crown the new champion as the title was left vacant by Yuki Egawa on February 3, 2020. He was scheduled to face Shuhei Kumura at Krush 119 on November 27, 2020, in the tournament semifinals. Niimi won the fight by unanimous decision.

Advancing to the tournament finals, Niimi faced Riku Morisaka. The fight was ruled a draw after the first three rounds were fought, with two of the judges scoring the bout as a draw (29-29 and 30-30), while the third judge scored it 30-29 in Niimi's favor. Accordingly, an extension rounds was fought, after which Niimi won a unanimous decision.

==== Title reign ====
Niimi was scheduled to make his first title defense against the undefeated Toma Tanabe at Krush 122 on February 27, 2021. The fight was a rematch of their August 24, 2019 meeting, which Toma won by unanimous decision. Niimi won the fight by majority decision, with scores of 30-28, 29-28 and 28-28.

For his second title defense, Niimi was scheduled to fight Keito Okajima at Krush 114 on June 25, 2021. The fight was likewise a rematch of the July 11, 2020 meeting, which Okajima won by unanimous decision. Niimi won the fight by first-round knockout, stopping Okajima 16 seconds into the round.

Niimi was scheduled to face Taito Gunji at K-1 World GP 2021: Yokohamatsuri on September 20, 2021. Niimi was unable to find much success against Taito and lost the fight by unanimous decision, with scores of 30-29, 30-29 and 30-27.

Niimi was scheduled to make his third Krush title defense against Tatsuki Shinotsuka at Krush 132 on December 18, 2021. He won the fight by a second-round knockout. Niimi knocked Shinotsuka down as soon as the fight started with a combination of a right hook and left straight, although he was unable to finish him in the remaining three minutes. He knocked Shinotsuka three more times in the second round, which forced the referee to wave the fight off.

Niimi was booked to face the former K-1 Featherweight titleholder Tatsuya Tsubakihara at K-1: K'Festa 5 on April 3, 2022. He lost the fight by unanimous decision. He lost the fight by unanimous decision, with two scorecards of 30–29 in Tsubakihara's favor, and one 30–28 scorecard.

Niimi was scheduled to make his fourth Krush featherweight title defense against Shuhei Kumura at Krush 137 on May 21, 2022. He lost the title by unanimous decision, with all three of the ringside officials scoring the bout 30–29 in favor of his opponent.

=== Continued featherweight career ===
Niimi faced the Enfusion and ONE Championship veteran Wang Junguang in the quarterfinal bout of the 2022 K-1 Featherweight World Grand Prix, which was held at K-1 World GP 2022 in Fukuoka on August 11, 2022. He lost the fight by unanimous decision, with all three judges scoring the bout 30–29 for Junguang.

Niimi faced Yuta Kunieda at K-1 World GP 2022 in Osaka on December 3, 2022. He won the fight by majority decision, with two judges scoring the bout 30–28 and 30–27 in his favor, while the third judge scored it an even 29–29 draw.

Niimi faced the RISE featherweight champion Keisuke Monguchi at RISE EL DORADO 2023 on March 26, 2023. He lost the fight by unanimous decision, with two scorecards of 30–28 and one scorecard of 30–29.

Niimi faced the undefeated Takumi Terada at Krush 150 on June 16, 2023. He won the fight by unanimous decision, after knocking Terada down in the second round, with all three judges scoring the fight 29–27 in his favor.

Niimi faced Rei Inagaki at Krush 154 on October 21, 2023. He lost the fight by unanimous decision, with all three ringside officials having scored the bout 28–27 for Inagaki. Although Niimi was able to knock his opponent down in the second round, he was himself knocked down by Inagaki in the following round.

Niimi faced the former Wu Lin Feng China -60 kg champion Yang Ming at Wu Lin Feng 2023 Year-End Kung Fu Festival on December 30, 2023. He lost the fight by unanimous decision.

Niimi challenged the K-1 featherweight (-57.5kg) champion Takumi Terada at K-1 World MAX 2025 on February 9, 2025.

== Titles and accomplishments ==
- Krush
  - 2020 Krush Featherweight (-57.5kg) Champion
    - Three successful title defenses
  - 2021 Krush Fighter of the Year

== Fight record ==
Kickboxing record
19 Wins (9 (T)KO's), 14 Losses, 1 Draw, 0 No Contest
Date	Result	Opponent	Event	Location	Method	Round	Time
2026-09-26	Win	(Japan) Shoki Kaneda	Krush 192	Tokyo, Japan	TKO (referee stoppage)	2	2:59
2026-04-11	Loss	(Japan) Rui Okubo	K-1 Genki 2026	Tokyo, Japan	Decision (majority)	3	3:00
2026-02-01	Win	(Japan) Haruto Matsumoto	Krush 186	Osaka, Japan	Ext.R Decision (unanimous)	4	3:00
2025-09-27	Loss	(China) Zhang Yong	Wu Lin Feng 554	Tianjin, China	Decision (unanimous)	3	3:00
2025-04-29	Loss	(Japan) Kosei Sekiguchi	Krush 173	Tokyo, Japan	Decision (split)	3	3:00
2025-02-09	Loss	(Japan) Takumi Terada	K-1 World MAX 2025	Tokyo, Japan	Decision (unanimous)	3	3:00
For the K-1 Featherweight (-57.5kg) title.
2024-11-23	Win	(Japan) Takeru Owaki	Krush 168	Nagoya, Japan	KO (left cross)	1	2:16
2024-07-27	Win	(Japan) Masaki Takeuchi	Krush 163	Tokyo, Japan	TKO (punches)	2	1:45
2024-03-10	Draw	(Japan) Kaito	HOOST CUP KINGS KYOTO 13	Kyoto, Japan	Ext.R Decision (majority)	4	3:00
2023-12-30	Loss	(China) Yang Ming	Wu Lin Feng 2023 Year-End Kung Fu Festival	Zhengzhou, China	Decision (unanimous)	3	3:00
2023-10-21	Loss	(Japan) Rei Inagaki	Krush 154	Tokyo, Japan	Decision (unanimous)	3	3:00
2023-06-16	Win	(Japan) Takumi Terada	Krush 150	Tokyo, Japan	Decision (unanimous)	3	3:00
2023-03-26	Loss	(Japan) Keisuke Monguchi	RISE ELDORADO 2023	Tokyo, Japan	Decision (unanimous)	3	3:00
2022-12-03	Win	(Japan) Yuta Kunieda	K-1 World GP 2022 in Osaka	Osaka, Japan	Decision (majority)	3	3:00
2022-08-11	Loss	(China) Wang Junguang	K-1 World GP 2022 in Fukuoka, Tournament Quarterfinals	Fukuoka, Japan	Decision (unanimous)	3	3:00
2022-05-21	Loss	(Japan) Shuhei Kumura	Krush 137	Tokyo, Japan	Decision (unanimous)	3	3:00
Loses the Krush Featherweight (-57.5kg) title.
2022-04-03	Loss	(Japan) Tatsuya Tsubakihara	K-1: K'Festa 5	Tokyo, Japan	Decision (unanimous)	3	3:00
2021-12-18	Win	(Japan) Tatsuki Shinotsuka	Krush 132	Tokyo, Japan	KO (punches and knee)	2	2:57
Defends the Krush Featherweight (-57.5kg) title.
2021-09-20	Loss	(Japan) Taito Gunji	K-1 World GP 2021: Yokohamatsuri	Yokohama, Japan	Decision (unanimous)	3	3:00
2021-06-25	Win	(Japan) Keito Okajima	Krush 126	Tokyo, Japan	KO (punches)	1	0:16
Defends the Krush Featherweight (-57.5kg) title.
2021-02-27	Win	(Japan) Toma	Krush 122	Tokyo, Japan	Decision (majority)	3	3:00
Defends the Krush Featherweight (-57.5kg) title.
2020-11-27	Win	(Japan) Riku Morisaka	Krush 119, Featherweight Championship Tournament Final	Tokyo, Japan	Ext.R Decision (unanimous)	4	3:00
Wins the Krush Featherweight (-57.5kg) title.
2020-11-27	Win	(Japan) Shuhei Kumura	Krush 119, Featherweight Championship Tournament Semi Final	Tokyo, Japan	Decision (unanimous)	3	3:00
2020-07-11	Loss	(Japan) Keito Okajima	Krush 114	Tokyo, Japan	Decision (unanimous)	3	3:00
2019-12-28	Win	(Japan) Naoki Takahashi	K-1 World GP 2019 Japan: ～Women's Flyweight Championship Tournament～	Tokyo, Japan	Decision (unanimous)	3	3:00
2019-11-08	Win	(Japan) Tenma Sano	Krush 107	Tokyo, Japan	Decision (majority)	3	3:00
2019-08-24	Loss	(Japan) Toma	K-1 World GP 2019: Japan vs World 5 vs 5 & Special Superfight in Osaka	Osaka, Japan	Decision (unanimous)	3	3:00
2019-06-01	Win	(Japan) Rikiya Yamaura	KHAOS 8	Tokyo, Japan	KO (low Kicks)	3	0:48
2019-04-13	Win	(China) Wu Hoichan	Dragon Fight	Xianyang, China	Decision (unanimous)	3	3:00
2019-02-23	Win	(China) Yue Heng	Wu Lin Feng 2019: WLF Championship in Zhengzhou	Zhengzhou, China	KO	2	
2018-12-23	Win	(Japan) Takato	HOOST CUP KINGS NAGOYA 5	Nagoya, Japan	TKO (punches)	1	1:43
2018-09-24	Loss	(Japan) Ryuto Matsumoto	Suk Wanchai MuayThai Super Fight vol.5	Nagoya, Japan	Decision (unanimous)	3	3:00
2018-08-18	Win	(Japan) Tetsuji Noda	Krush.92 ～in NAGOYA～	Nagoya, Japan	Decision (unanimous)	3	3:00
2018-05-20	Win	(Japan) Sho Yamaguchi	HOOST CUP KINGS NAGOYA 4 - Kick Revolution	Nagoya, Japan	TKO (3 knockdowns)	1	2:49
Legend: Win Loss Draw/No contest Notes

== See also ==
- List of male kickboxers
- List of Krush champions
