= Wang Junguang =

Chinese kickboxer (born 1994)

- Born: December 25, 1994 (age 31); Shangqiu, Henan, China
- Nickname: "Golden Boy"
- Height: 168 cm (5 ft 6 in)
- Weight: 56.7 kg (125 lb; 8.93 st)
- Division: Super Flyweight
- Style: Kickboxing, Muay Thai
- Stance: Orthodox
- Fighting out of: Zhoukou, China
- Team: China Kodai Ken Club; Zhoukou Hongyang Bo'ao Kickboxing Club; Dadongxiang Fight Club (former); Tianjin Afu Fight Club (fomer)
- Years active: 2014 - present

Kickboxing record
- Total: 39
- Wins: 31
- By knockout: 5
- Losses: 7
- By knockout: 0
- Draws: 1

Wang Junguang (Chinese: 王俊光, born December 25, 1994) is a Chinese kickboxer. He is the former Enfusion 57 kg World champion.

Combat Press ranked him in the super flyweight top ten between September 2020 and July 2021. From May 2019 to August 2020, he was ranked in the strawweight top ten by Combat Press.

== Martial arts career ==
Junguang was scheduled to fight Akira Yoshida at Glory of Heroes 6. He won the fight by a second round KO.

Junguang travelled to japan to face Yuzuki Satomi at Krush 77 on July 16, 2017. He won the bout by majority decision.

In September 2017, Junguang was scheduled to fight for the K-1 Featherweight title against the incumbent titleholder Takeru Segawa. Takeru won the fight by a unanimous decision.

Wang was scheduled to fight Longoen Dabransarakarm at WLF 2019 First Group Stage. He won the fight by a unanimous decision.

Junguang captured the vacant Enfusion 57 kg title with a fourth round knockout of Jorge Varela during the WLF's 2019 Third Stage event.

He made his ONE Championship debut in October 2019, when he was scheduled to fight Federico Roma. He won the fight by a first round TKO.

Junguang fought Sam-A Gaiyanghadao for the inaugural ONE Strawweight Kickboxing title during ONE Championship: Mark Of Greatness. Sam-A won the fight by a unanimous decision.

Junguang fought Aslanbek Zikreev during ONE Championship: Inside the Matrix 4. He lost the fight by split decision.

== Titles and accomplishments ==
- Enfusion
  - 2019 Enfusion -57 kg Champion

== Kickboxing record ==
Kickboxing record
30 wins (6 (T)KOs), 7 losses, 1 draw
Date	Result	Opponent	Event	Location	Method	Round	Time
2026-12-12		(Italy) Jonathan Di Bella	ONE 174	Shanghai, China			
For the ONE Strawweight Kickboxing World Championship.
2026-10-16	Win	(Thailand) Prajanchai P.K.Saenchaimuaythaigym	ONE The Inner Circle 35, Lumpinee Stadium	Bangkok, Thailand	Decision (split)	3	3:00
2024-02-03	Win	(Thailand) Jaroengeern	Wu Lin Feng 20th Year Anniversary	Zhengzhou, China	KO (spinning back kick)	1	
2023-09-28	Win	(Belarus) Vitali Ramanouski	Glory of Heroes 48	Aral, Xinjiang, China	Decision (unanimous)	3	3:00
2023-06-24	Win	(Georgia (country)) Temur Tchezhia	Wu Lin Feng 539	Tangshan, China	Decision (unanimous)	3	3:00
2022-12-03	Loss	(Japan) Taito Gunji	K-1 World GP 2022 in Osaka	Osaka, Japan	Decision (majority)	3	3:00
2022-08-11	Loss	(Japan) Toma	K-1 World GP 2022 in Fukuoka, Tournament Semifinals	Fukuoka, Japan	Decision (unanimous)	3	3:00
2022-08-11	Win	(Japan) Takahito Niimi	K-1 World GP 2022 in Fukuoka, Tournament Quarterfinals	Fukuoka, Japan	Decision (unanimous)	3	3:00
2022-03-26	Win	(China) Qumu Xifu	Wu Lin Feng 528	Zhengzhou, China	Decision (unanimous)	3	3:00
2021-10-30	Win	(China) Liu Zhipeng	Wu Lin Feng 2021: WLF on Haihua Island	Daizhou, China	Decision (unanimous)	3	3:00
2020-11-20	Loss	(Russia) Aslanbek Zikreev	ONE Championship: Inside the Matrix 4	Kallang, Singapore	Decision (split)	3	3:00
2019-12-09	Loss	(Thailand) Sam-A Gaiyanghadao	ONE Championship: Mark Of Greatness	Kuala Lumpur, Malaysia	Decision (unanimous)	5	3:00
For the inaugural Inaugural ONE Strawweight Muay Thai title.
2019-10-26	Win	(Argentina) Federico Roma	ONE Championship: Dawn Of Valor	Jakarta, Indonesia	TKO (3 knockdowns/punches)	1	2:57
2019-08-31	Win	(Spain) Jorge Varela	Wu Lin Feng 2019: WLF -67kg World Cup 2019-2020 3rd Group Stage	Zhengzhou, China	KO (spinning back kick to the body)	4	0:55
Wins the inaugural Enfusion World -57kg title.
2019-06-29	Win	(Thailand) Longoen Dabransarakarm	Wu Lin Feng 2019: WLF -67kg World Cup 2019-2020 1st Group Stage	Zhengzhou, China	Decision (unanimous)	3	3:00
2018-09-15	Win	(Russia) Khavazh Oligov	Glory of Heroes 34: Tongling	Anhui, China	Decision (unanimous)	3	3:00
2018-07-28	Win	(Japan) Tenma Sano	Glory of Heroes 33: Shanghai	Shanghai, China	Decision (unanimous)	3	3:00
2018-05-26	Win	(Ukraine) Yevgen Kraminskyi	Glory of Heroes 31: Beijing	Beijing, China	Decision (unanimous)	3	3:00
2018-03-03	Win	(New Zealand) Dominic Reed	Glory of Heroes: New Zealand vs China	Auckland, New Zealand	Decision (unanimous)	3	3:00
2017-12-23	Loss	(Russia) Astemir Borsov	Glory of Heroes: Jinan, 57 kg Tournament Semi-Finals	Jinan, China	Decision (unanimous)	3	3:00
2017-09-18	Loss	(Japan) Takeru	K-1 World GP 2017 Welterweight Championship Tournament	Tokyo, Japan	Decision (unanimous)	3	3:00
For the K-1 World Featherweight (-57.5kg) title.
2017-07-16	Win	(Japan) Yuzuki Satomi	Glory of Heroes: Japan & Krush.77	Tokyo, Japan	Decision (majority)	3	3:00
2017-05-27	Win	(Portugal) Bernardo Mendes	Glory of Heroes: Portugal & Strikers League	Carcavelos, Portugal	Decision	3	3:00
2017-03-25	Win	(Thailand) Shaxi	Rise of Heroes: Hengyang	Hengyang, China	Decision (unanimous)	3	3:00
2017-01-13	Win	(Japan) Akira Yoshida	Glory of Heroes 6	Jiyuan, China	KO (punches)	2	
2016-10-14	Win	(Thailand) Phetkriangkrai Tor Silachai	Wu Lin Feng x KF1	Hong Kong	Decision	3	3:00
2016-09-17	Win	(China) Feng Tianhao	Rise of Heroes 1, 57kg Tournament Final	Chaoyang, China	Decision (unanimous)	3	3:00
2016-09-17	Win	(Thailand) Thanapon	Rise of Heroes 1, 57kg Tournament Semifinals	Jiyuan, Chaoyang	TKO	2	
2016-08-06	Win	(Thailand) Sankeng	Glory of Heroes 4	Changzhi, Chaoyang	Decision (unanimous)	3	3:00
2016-06-17	Loss	(France) Hakim Hamech	Wu Lin Feng	China	Decision	3	3:00
2016-06-04	Win	(Japan) Masafumi Kurasaki	Wu Lin Feng vs Krush	China	KO (3 knockdowns)	1	
2016-03-05	Win	(Netherlands) Sufenni Haji	Wu Lin Feng	China	Decision	3	3:00
2015-11-07	Win	(Russia) Sirik Urazov	Wu Lin Feng	China			
2015-04-12	Draw	(Japan) Bazooka Koki	Wu Lin Feng x FG - China vs Japan	Tokyo, Japan	Decision (majority)	3	3:00
2015-01-17	Win	(Thailand) Bo Min	Wu Lin Feng	China	Decision	3	3:00
2014-01-03	Win	(Thailand) Petchklangnam Sor Visetkij	Hero Legends	Shandong, China	Decision	3	3:00
Legend: Win Loss Draw/no contest Notes

== See also ==
- List of male kickboxers
