= Shoki Kaneda =

Japanese kickboxer (born 1999)

- Born: 兼田将暉; June 25, 1999 (age 27); Osaka, Japan
- Other names: SHOKI☆ハリケーン
- Height: 168 cm (5 ft 6 in)
- Weight: 57.5 kg (127 lb; 9.05 st)
- Style: Kickboxing, Karate
- Stance: Southpaw
- Fighting out of: Sakai, Japan
- Team: RKS Kenshuu Juku

Kickboxing record
- Total: 28
- Wins: 23
- By knockout: 11
- Losses: 5
- By knockout: 3

Other information
- Notable relatives: Ryuki Kaneda

Shoki Kaneda (Japanese: 兼田将暉, Kaneda Shoki) is a Japanese kickboxer, currently competing in the featherweight division of K-1. As an amateur, Kaneda won the 2017 K-1 super featherweight Koshien tournament.

As of January 2022 he was the #3 ranked Bantamweight kickboxer in the world by both Beyond Kickboxing and Combat Press.

== Biography and career ==
=== Early career ===
==== HEAT & RKS champion ====
Kaneda made his professional debut against Makoto a.k.a BASTA at RKS Seriken Bousou Taifuu Densetsu vol.1 on March 6, 2016. He won the fight by unanimous decision. He would win three more professional bouts, all by decision, before entering the 2017 K-1 super featherweight Koshien tournament in the -60 kg weight class. He overcame Ryunosuke Nakasuji, Taketo Nukui and Yutaro Shimizu in the first three rounds of the tournament, which all took place on July 29, 2017. These three victories earned him a place in the finals, which took place at K-1 World GP 2017 on November 23, 2017. He captured the tournament title with a unanimous decision win against Tomoya Yokoyama.

As he returned to professional competition, Kaneda faced Ryo Sakoi for the vacant RKS Super Featherweight title at RKS Gold Rush III on December 16, 2018. He won the title by a second-round knockout. Three months later, at HEAT 44 on March 2, 2019, Kaneda took part in the 2019 HEAT Lightweight tournament. He was given a walk-over to the finals, as his semi-final opponent Chao Rogate was disqualified for coming in overweight, and faced Henry Cejas in the finals of the one-day tournament. Kaneda won the title by split decision, after an extra fourth round was contested.

Kaneda made his first RSK super featherweight title defense against Chen Yuxi at RKS Gold Rush IV on May 12, 2019. He retained the title by a first-round technical knockout. Kaneda next faced the former Lumpinee Stadium flyweight champion Chao Rocket in a non-title bout at HEAT 45 on July 28, 2019. He won the fight by a second-round technical knockout. Kaneda made his second RSK super featherweight title defense against Chonbon at RKS Gold Rush V on October 20, 2019. He retained the title by unanimous decision.

Kaneda made his first HEAT lightweight title defense against Henry Cejas at HEAT 46 on January 16, 2020. The pair first faced each other at HEAT 44 on March 2, 2019, with Kaneda winning the bout by split decision. He lost the rematch however, as he was floored by a left hook at the 1:00 minute mark of the second round.

Kaneda made his third RKS super featherweight title defense against Yusuke at RKS Gold Rush VI on April 5, 2020. He won the fight by a third-round knockout. Kaneda was booked to make his fourth RKS title defense against Kaito Sakaguchi at RKS GOLD RUSH VII on November 29, 2020. He lost the fight by majority decision, with scores of 29–28, 29–29 and 30–29.

==== ACCEL featherweight champion ====
After suffering the third loss of his professional career, Kaneda moved down to featherweight. In his first fight at a new weight, Kaneda was booked to face Koki Oomae for the ACCEL Featherweight title at ACCEL 50 on December 27, 2020. He won the fight by a first-round knockout.

Kaneda next made his KNOCK OUT debut against Shogo Kuriaki at KNOCK OUT-EX vol.1 on April 4, 2021. He won the fight by majority decision, with scores of 29–29, 30–29 and 29–28. Kaneda faced Takashi Oiwa at RKS GOLD RUSH VIII on July 11, 2021, in his second and final fight of the year. He won the bout by a first-round knockout, flooring Oiwa with a head kick near the end of the opening round.

=== K-1 ===
Kaneda was booked to make his Krush debut against Ryuto at Krush 133 on January 28, 2022. He had trouble making weight at the official weigh-ins, as he came in 500 g over the featherweight (-57.5 kg) limit, but was able to weigh in below the limit at the second weigh-in. Kaneda won the fight by unanimous decision, with two scorecards of 30–28 and one scorecard of 30–27.

Kaneda faced Yuta Hayashi at Krush.138 on June 17, 2022. He won the fight by unanimous decision, with scores of 30–29, 30–28 and 30–27. Kaneda would then briefly return to RKS, in order to face Fuya Hirai for the vacant RKS Featherweight title at RKS GOLD RUSH VII on September 4, 2022. He needed just 46 seconds to stop Hirai and capture the vacant championship.

Kaneda faced the former K-1 featherweight champion Tatsuya Tsubakihara at K-1 World GP 2022 in Osaka on December 3, 2022, in what was his K-1 debut. He won the fight by unanimous decision, with all three judges scoring the bout 30–26 in his favor. Kaneda was able to knock Tsubakihara twice during the contest, once in the second and once in the third round.

Kaneda faced Liu Zhipeng at Wu Lin Feng 536: China vs Japan on April 22, 2023. He won the fight by unanimous decision.

Kaneda faced Daosayam Wor.Wanchai at K-1 ReBIRTH 2 on December 9, 2023. He won the fight by a first-round technical knockout.

Kaneda faced Daiki Toita at K-1 World MAX 2024 - World Tournament Opening Round on March 20, 2024. He won the fight by a second-round knockout.

Kaneda faced Takumi Terada at K-1 World MAX 2024 - World Championship Tournament Final on July 7, 2024. He lost the fight by majority decision.

Kaneda faced Toma at K-1 World GP 2024 in Osaka on October 5, 2024. He won the fight by a first-round knockout.

Kaneda faced the former Krush featherweight champion Shuhei Kumura at K-1 World MAX 2025 on February 9, 2025. He won the fight by a first-round knockout.

Kaneda faced Ginji at K-1 Dontaku on July 13, 2025. He won the fight by a third-round knockout.

== Titles and accomplishments ==
Professional

- ACCEL
  - 2020 ACCEL Featherweight Championship
- HEAT
  - 2019 HEAT Kick Lightweight Championship
- Real Kakutou Spirits
  - 2018 RKS Super Featherweight Championship
  - 2022 RKS Featherweight Championship

Amateur

- 2017 K-1 Koshien -60 kg Championship

=== Karate ===
- 2019 FIKA Seidokaikan All Japan Adidas Cup Full Contact plus -60 kg Winner
- 2012 Pro-Karate do Kakutou Budo All Japan Championship Middle School Winner

== Kickboxing record ==
Kickboxing record
24 Wins (12 (T)KO's), 5 Losses, 0 Draw, 0 No Contest
Date	Result	Opponent	Event	Location	Method	Round	Time
2026-09-26	Loss	(Japan) Takahito Niimi	Krush 192	Tokyo, Japan	TKO (referee stoppage)	2	2:59
2025-07-13	Win	(Japan) Ginji	K-1 Dontaku	Fukuoka, Japan	KO (high kick)	3	1:26
2025-02-09	Win	(Japan) Shuhei Kumura	K-1 World MAX 2025	Tokyo, Japan	KO (left cross)	1	2:57
2024-10-05	Win	(Japan) Toma	K-1 World GP 2024 in Osaka	Osaka, Japan	KO (left hook)	1	1:11
2024-07-07	Loss	(Japan) Takumi Terada	K-1 World MAX 2024 - World Championship Tournament Final	Tokyo, Japan	Decision (majority)	3	3:00
2024-03-20	Win	(Japan) Daiki Toita	K-1 World MAX 2024 - World Tournament Opening Round	Tokyo, Japan	TKO (punches)	2	2:13
2023-12-09	Win	(Thailand) Daosayam Wor.Wanchai	K-1 ReBIRTH 2	Osaka, Japan	TKO (punches)	1	2:17
2023-04-22	Win	(China) Liu Zhipeng	Wu Lin Feng 536: China vs Japan	Tangshan, China	Decision (unanimous)	3	3:00
2022-12-03	Win	(Japan) Tatsuya Tsubakihara	K-1 World GP 2022 in Osaka	Osaka, Japan	Decision (unanimous)	3	3:00
2022-09-04	Win	(Japan) Fuya Hirai	RKS GOLD RUSH VII	Osaka, Japan	TKO	1	0:46
Wins the vacant RKS Featherweight title
2022-06-17	Win	(Japan) Yuta Hayashi	Krush.138	Tokyo, Japan	Decision (unanimous)	3	3:00
2022-01-28	Win	(Japan) Ryuto	Krush 133	Tokyo, Japan	Decision (unanimous)	3	3:00
2021-07-11	Win	(Japan) Takashi Oiwa	RKS GOLD RUSH VIII	Osaka, Japan	KO (high kick)	1	2:37
2021-04-04	Win	(Japan) Shogo Kuriaki	KNOCK OUT-EX vol.1	Tokyo, Japan	Decision (majority)	3	3:00
2020-12-27	Win	(Japan) Koki Oomae	ACCEL 50	Kobe, Japan	KO (right cross)	1	1:43
Wins ACCEL Featherweight title
2020-11-29	Loss	(Japan) Kaito	RKS GOLD RUSH VII	Osaka, Japan	Decision (majority)	3	3:00
Loses the RKS Super Featherweight title
2020-04-05	Win	(Japan) Yusuke	RKS Gold Rush VI	Osaka, Japan	KO	3	
Defends RKS Super Featherweight title
2020-01-16	Loss	(Bolivia) Henry Cejas	HEAT 46	Tokyo, Japan	KO (left hook)	2	1:00
Loses the HEAT KICK Lightweight title
2019-10-20	Win	(Japan) Chonbon	RKS Gold Rush V	Osaka, Japan	Decision (unanimous)	3	3:00
Defends RKS Super Featherweight title
2019-07-28	Win	(Thailand) Chao Rocket	HEAT 45	Nagoya, Japan	KO	2	
2019-05-12	Win	(Taiwan) Chen Yuxi	RKS Gold Rush IV	Osaka, Japan	TKO	1	
Defended the RKS Super Featherweight title
2019-03-02	Win	(Bolivia) Henry Cejas	HEAT 44, Tournament Final	Nagoya, Japan	Ext.R Decision (split)	4	3:00
Wins the vacant HEAT KICK Lightweight title
2018-12-16	Win	(Japan) Ryo Sakoi	RKS Gold Rush III	Osaka, Japan	KO (head kick)	2	2:15
Wins the vacant RKS Super Featherweight title
2018-09-29	Loss	(China) Zhao Chongyang	World Boxing Championship	Ankang, China	TKO (knee to the head)	3	2:05
2018-05-20	Win	(Japan) Okami	MAJKF RKS Gold Rush II	Osaka, Japan	Decision	3	3:00
2017-05-28	Win	(Japan) Naoki Morizono	MAJKF	Osaka, Japan	Decision (unanimous)	3	3:00
2017-04-02	Win	(Japan) Ippei	RKS All Japan	Osaka, Japan	Decision (split)	3	3:00
2016-10-02	Win	(Japan) Kanta Tabuchi	MAJKF THE ONE AND ONLY	Osaka, Japan	Decision (unanimous)	3	3:00
2016-03-06	Win	(Japan) Makoto a.k.a BASTA	RKS Seriken Bousou Taifuu Densetsu vol.1	Osaka, Japan	Decision (unanimous)	3	3:00
Legend: Win Loss Draw/No contest Notes

=== Amateur record ===
Amateur Kickboxing record
Date	Result	Opponent	Event	Location	Method	Round	Time
2017-11-23	Win	(Japan) Tomoya Yokoyama	K-1 World GP 2017 - Koshien Tournament, Final	Tokyo, Japan	Decision (Unanimous)	3	2:00
Wins the 2017 K-1 Koshien -60kg title
2017-07-29	Win	(Japan) Yutaro Shimizu	2017 K-1 Koshien Tournament, Semi Final	Tokyo, Japan	Decision (majority)	1	2:00
2017-07-29	Win	(Japan) Taketo Nukui	2017 K-1 Koshien Tournament, Quarter Final	Tokyo, Japan	Decision	1	2:00
2017-07-29	Win	(Japan) Ryunosuke Nakasuji	2017 K-1 Koshien Tournament, First Round	Tokyo, Japan	Decision (unanimous)	1	2:00
2016-07-30	Loss	(Japan) Taiyo Sugiyama	2016 K-1 Koshien Tournament, Second Round	Tokyo, Japan	Ext.R Decision (split)	2	2:00
2016-07-30	Win	(Japan) Katsuya Kozuru	2016 K-1 Koshien Tournament, First Round	Tokyo, Japan	TKO		
2015-11-15	Win	(Japan)	RKS Double Blade 2	Osaka, Japan	KO	2	
2014-11-02	Win	(Japan) Takuma Hamamoto	RKS Double Clutch 3	Osaka, Japan	Decision (unanimous)	2	2:00
2013-12-08	Win	(Japan) Kazuki Uehara	MAJKF RKS	Osaka, Japan	Decision	1	2:00
2013-08-04	Draw	(Japan) Tsubasa Yoshikawa	GLADIATOR 58	Osaka, Japan	Decision	2	2:00
2013-06-09	Win	(Japan) Kazuya Oohara	Chakuriki Gold Rush 2 Double Blade	Osaka, Japan	Decision (unanimous)	2	1:30
2013-03-31	Loss	(Japan) Begin Yoshioka	Chakuriki Gold Rush in RKS	Osaka, Japan	Decision (split)	2	2:00
2012-09-02	Loss	(Japan) Kazane Nagai	KJC	Osaka, Japan	Decision	2	1:30
2012-08-19	Loss	(Japan) Takumi Naito	J-NETWORK - J-GROW 42 School Wars	Tokyo, Japan	KO	1	
2012-07-15	Loss	(Japan) Kazane Nagai	Kyoken Jr Kick	Osaka, Japan	Decision	2	1:30
2012-05-20	Draw	(Japan) Kakyo Sakai	Kyoken Jr Kick	Osaka, Japan	Decision	1	2:00
2012-05-20	Win	(Japan) Riki Oono	Kyoken Jr Kick	Osaka, Japan	Decision	1	2:00
2012-04-15	Loss	(Japan) Ryusei Shimizu	Chakuriki Fighting Gala 5	Osaka, Japan	Decision (unanimous)	1	1:30
2012-03-11	Win	(Japan) Takahira	Kyoken Jr Kick	Osaka, Japan	Decision	2	1:30
Legend: Win Loss Draw/No contest Notes

== See also ==
- List of male kickboxers
