= Shuhei Kumura =

Japanese kickboxer (born 1996)

- Born: September 4, 1996 (age 30); Osaka, Japan
- Height: 170 cm (5 ft 7 in)
- Weight: 57.5 kg (127 lb; 9.05 st)
- Division: Super Flyweight
- Style: Kickboxing
- Stance: Orthodox
- Fighting out of: Tokyo, Japan
- Team: K-1 GYM Gotanda Team KINGS
- Years active: 2013 - present

Kickboxing record
- Total: 39
- Wins: 23
- By knockout: 12
- Losses: 15
- By knockout: 5
- No contests: 1

Other information
- Notable relatives: Masashi Kumura (brother)

Shuhei Kumura (玖村 修平) is a Japanese kickboxer, fighting out of Tokyo, Japan. He is the former Krush Featherweight (-57.5kg) champion.

As of June 2022, Combat Press ranks him as the fourth best super flyweight kickboxer in the world.

== Kickboxing career ==
=== NJKF ===
Kumura made his professional debut at NJKF 2013 5th against Hiroki Matsuoka, winning the fight by unanimous decision. He would go on to amass an 8–3 record, which earned him the chance to fight Koudai Kusaka for the NJKF Bantamweight title. He beat Kusaka by a fourth-round TKO. His last fight with NJKF was at NJKF 2017 west 4th, when he fought Ryo Takahashi. Kumura lost the fight by unanimous decision.

In early 2018, Kumura signed with K-1, and was scheduled to have his organizational debut at Krush 89, when he was scheduled to fight Takaya Ogura. He beat Ogura by majority decision. Kumura next fought Kaito Yamawaki at Krush 92, winning the fight by unanimous decision. Making the transition from Krush to K-1, Kumura fought a no-contest due to doctor stoppage against Yuta Hayashi and lost an extra round decision against Akihiro Kaneko.

Kumura participated in the 2019 K-1 Super Bantamweight Grand Prix. He defeated Sadegh Hashemi by TKO, after knocking the Iranian down twice in the third round. He lost the semifinal bout to the eventual tournament winner Yoshiki Takei by way of TKO, as he was knocked down twice in the first round.

Kumura lost his next fight against Taito Gunji by unanimous decision, but was nonetheless given a place in the Krush Super Bantamweight tournament. He beat Hideki in the quarterfinals by way of a third-round knockout. Advancing to the semifinal, he fought Takahito Niimi. Niimi won the fight by unanimous decision.

He was next scheduled to fight at K'Festa 4. He won a unanimous decision against Takahiro at K-1 World GP 2021: K’Festa 4 Day.2.

Kumura was scheduled to fight Tatsuya Tsubakihara in a non-title bout at K-1 World GP 2021: Japan Bantamweight Tournament. Tsubakihara won the fight by unanimous decision.

Kumura was scheduled to face Kizaemon Saiga at K-1 World GP 2021 in Osaka on December 4, 2021. He won the fight by a first-round knockout, stopping Saiga after just 67 seconds.

Kumura was scheduled to face Kaito Ozawa at K-1 World GP 2022 Japan on February 27, 2022. He won the fight by unanimous decision, with all three judges scoring the bout 30–29 in his favor.

=== Krush featherweight champion ===
Kumura was rewarded for this two-fight winning streak with the opportunity to challenge the reigning Krush Featherweight champion Takahito Niimi at Krush 137 on May 21, 2022. He won the fight by unanimous decision, with all three judges scoring the bout 30–29 in his favor.

Kumura faced the 2019 K-1 Featherweight World Grand Prix finalist Jawsuayai Sor.Dechaphan at K-1 World GP 2022 in Fukuoka on August 11, 2022, in the quarterfinals of the 2022 K-1 featherweight World Grand Prix. He won the fight by a second-round technical knockout. Kumura had a great start to the fight, as he knocked Jawsuayai with a high kick near the end of the opening round. He knocked his opponent down twice more in the following round, first with a jab counter to a lead leg kick and then with a flurry of punches, with resulted in a stoppage victory for him under the tournament rules. Kumura faced the incumbent K-1 featherweight champion Taito Gunji in the next round of the one-day tournament. He lost the fight by a first-round knockout.

Kumura faced the 2022 K-1 Featherweight World Grand Prix runner-up Toma Tanabe at K-1 World GP 2022 in Osaka on December 3, 2022. He lost the fight by unanimous decision, with scores of 30–25, 30–25 and 30–26, after being knocked down twice in the first two rounds.

Kumura made his first Krush Featherweight (-57.5kg) title defense against Riku Morisaka at Krush 147 on March 25, 2023. He lost the fight by unanimous decision.

=== KNOCK OUT/K-1 ===
Kumura faced Shogo Kuriaki at KNOCK OUT 2023 vol.4 on September 16, 2023. He lost the fight by a first-round knockout.

Kumura faced Shoya Masumoto at Krush 162 on June 23, 2024. He won the fight by a first-round technical knockout.

Kumura faced Shoki Kaneda at K-1 World MAX 2025 on February 9, 2025. He lost the fight by a first-round knockout-

Kumura faced the former KNOCK OUT Black Featherweight champion Ryusei Kumagai in a -59 kg catchweight bout at KNOCK OUT 60 on December 30, 2025. He lost the fight by a second-round knockout.

== Titles and accomplishments ==
- New Japan Kickboxing Federation
  - 2017 NJKF Bantamweight Champion
- Krush
  - 2022 Krush Featherweight (-57.5kg) Champion

== Fight record ==
Kickboxing record
23 Wins (12 (T)KO's), 15 Losses, 0 Draw, 1 No Contest
Date	Result	Opponent	Event	Location	Method	Round	Time
2026-12-30		(Japan) Seiya Furuki	KNOCK OUT.17 ～K.O CLIMAX 2026～	Tokyo, Japan			
2026-08-08	Win	(Japan) Ryota Naito	KNOCK OUT.67	Osaka, Japan	Decision (Split)	3	3:00
2026-04-18	Loss	(Japan) Tatsuki	KNOCK OUT.63 SPRING FES in Okinawa	Ginowan, Okinawa, Japan	Decision (Unanimous)	3	3:00
2025-12-30	Loss	(Japan) Ryusei Kumagai	KNOCK OUT.60 - K.O CLIMAX 2025	Tokyo, Japan	KO (High kick)	2	2:55
2025-09-23	Win	(Japan) Masaji	KNOCK OUT 57	Tokyo, Japan	KO (Right hook)	3	3:00
2025-02-09	Loss	(Japan) Shoki Kaneda	K-1 World MAX 2025	Tokyo, Japan	KO (Left cross)	1	2:57
2024-10-05	Win	(Japan) Tatsuya Tsubakihara	K-1 World GP 2024 in Osaka	Osaka, Japan	Decision (Split)	3	3:00
2024-06-23	Win	(Japan) Shoya Masumoto	Krush 162	Tokyo, Japan	TKO (Referee stoppage)	1	2:48
2023-09-16	Loss	(Japan) Shogo Kuriaki	KNOCK OUT 2023 vol.4	Tokyo, Japan	KO (Left hook)	1	1:44
2023-03-25	Loss	(Japan) Riku Morisaka	Krush 147	Tokyo, Japan	Decision (Unanimous)	3	3:00
Loses the Krush Featherweight (-57.5kg) title.
2022-12-03	Loss	(Japan) Toma	K-1 World GP 2022 in Osaka	Osaka, Japan	Decision (Unanimous)	3	3:00
2022-08-11	Loss	(Japan) Taito Gunji	K-1 World GP 2022 in Fukuoka, Tournament Semifinals	Fukuoka, Japan	TKO (2 knockdowns/Punches)	1	3:00
2022-08-11	Win	(Thailand) Jawsuayai Sor.Dechaphan	K-1 World GP 2022 in Fukuoka, Tournament Quarterfinals	Fukuoka, Japan	TKO (2 knockdowns)	2	1:03
2022-05-21	Win	(Japan) Takahito Niimi	Krush 137	Tokyo, Japan	Decision (Unanimous)	3	3:00
Wins the Krush Featherweight (-57.5kg) title.
2022-02-27	Win	(Japan) Kaito Ozawa	K-1 World GP 2022 Japan	Tokyo, Japan	Decision (Unanimous)	3	3:00
2021-12-04	Win	(Japan) Kizaemon Saiga	K-1 World GP 2021 in Osaka	Osaka, Japan	KO (Right Cross)	1	1:07
2021-05-23	Loss	(Japan) Tatsuya Tsubakihara	K-1 World GP 2021: Japan Bantamweight Tournament	Tokyo, Japan	Decision (Unanimous)	3	3:00
2021-03-28	Win	(Japan) Takahiro	K-1 World GP 2021: K’Festa 4 Day.2	Yoyogi, Japan	Decision (Unanimous)	3	3:00
2020-11-27	Loss	(Japan) Takahito Niimi	Krush 119, -57 kg Championship Tournament Semi Finals	Tokyo, Japan	Decision (Unanimous)	3	3:00
2020-09-26	Win	(Japan) Hideki	Krush.117, -57 kg Championship Tournament Quarter Finals	Tokyo, Japan	KO (Straight Right)	3	0:40
2019-10-13	Loss	(Japan) Taito Gunji	Krush.106	Tokyo, Japan	Decision (Unanimous)	3	3:00
2019-06-30	Loss	(Japan) Yoshiki Takei	K-1 World GP 2019: Super Bantamweight World Tournament, Semi Finals	Saitama, Japan	TKO (2 Knockdowns/punches)	1	1:46
2019-06-30	Win	(Iran) Sadegh Hashemi	K-1 World GP 2019: Super Bantamweight World Tournament, Quarter Finals	Saitama, Japan	TKO (2 knockdowns/punches)	3	2:50
2019-03-10	Loss	(Japan) Akihiro Kaneko	K-1 World GP 2019: K’FESTA 2	Saitama, Japan	Ext.R Decision (Unanimous)	4	3:00
2018-12-18	NC	(Japan) Yuta Hayashi	K-1 World GP 2018: K-1 Lightweight World's Strongest Tournament	Osaka, Japan	Doctor Stoppage	1	
2018-08-18	Win	(Japan) Kaito Yamawaki	Krush.92 ～in NAGOYA～	Nagoya, Japan	Decision (Unanimous)	3	3:00
2018-06-30	Win	(Japan) Takaya Ogura	Krush.89	Tokyo, Japan	Decision (Majority)	3	3:00
2017-11-12	Loss	(Japan) Ryo Takahashi	NJKF 2017 west 4th	Tokyo, Japan	Decision (Unanimous)	3	3:00
2017-09-24	Win	(Thailand) Kongbannaw Acegym	NJKF 2017 3rd	Tokyo, Japan	KO (Punches)	2	2:07
2017-06-18	Win	(Japan) Koudai Kusaka	NJKF 2017 2nd	Tokyo, Japan	TKO (Corner Stoppage)	4	3:00
Wins the NJKF Bantamweight title.
2017-02-05	Win	(Japan) Hiroto Ichimura	NJKF 2017 west 1st	Tokyo, Japan	Decision (Unanimous)	3	3:00
2016-10-02	Loss	(Japan) Yuki Kyotani	Hoot Cup Kings Osaka	Osaka, Japan	Decision (Unanimous)	3	3:00
2016-06-26	Win	(Japan) Ryota Ina	NJKF 2016 4th	Osaka, Japan	Decision (Unanimous)	3	3:00
2015-11-15	Loss	(Japan) Moriya	NJKF 2015 6th	Tokyo, Japan	Ext.R Decision (Unanimous)	4	3:00
2015-04-05	Win	(South Korea) Choi Chong Bin	NJKF 2015 2nd	Tokyo, Japan	TKO	2	0:47
2014-12-21	Loss	(Japan) Unao Hatomune	DEEP KICK 23	Osaka, Japan	Decision (Unanimous)	3	3:00
2014-11-02	Win	(Japan) Tono	NJKF 2014 7th	Osaka, Japan	TKO (3 Knockdowns)	1	2:14
2014-06-01	Win	(Japan) Mitsuhito Ogura	NJKF 2014 4th	Osaka, Japan	Decision (Unanimous)	3	3:00
2014-03-09	Win	(Japan) Kaori Yukinari	NJKF 2014 2nd	Osaka, Japan	KO (Left High Kick)	1	1:32
2013-12-08	Win	(Japan) Kyosuke Nishida	NJKF 2013 8th	Japan	Decision (Unanimous)	3	3:00
2013-09-15	Win	(Japan) Hiroki Matsuoka	NJKF 2013 5th	Osaka, Japan	Decision (Majority)	3	2:00
Legend: Win Loss Draw/No contest Notes

Amateur Kickboxing Record
Date	Result	Opponent	Event	Location	Method	Round	Time
2013-03-17	Win	(Japan) Masahiko Suzuki	NJKF 2013 2nd	Osaka, Japan	Decision	2	2:00
Legend: Win Loss Draw/No contest Notes

== See also ==
- List of male kickboxers
