= 2021 in K-1 =

Mixed martial arts events

Information
- First date: March 28, 2021
- Last date: December 4, 2021

Events
- Total events: 7

Fights
- Total fights: 116
- Title fights: 8

The year 2021 is the 28th year in the history of the K-1, a Japanese kickboxing promotion. The year started with K-1: K’Festa 4.

== List of events ==
#	Event Title	Date	Arena	Location
1	K-1: K’Festa 4 Day 1	March 21, 2021	Tokyo Garden Theater	Tokyo, Japan
2	K-1: K’Festa 4 Day 2	March 28, 2021	Nippon Budokan	Tokyo, Japan
3	K-1 World GP 2021: Japan Bantamweight Tournament	May 30, 2021	Yokohama Budokan	Naka-ku, Yokohama, Japan
4	K-1 World GP 2021 in Fukuoka	July 17, 2021	Fukuoka Convention Center	Fukuoka, Japan
5	K-1 World GP 2021: Yokohamatsuri	September 20, 2021	Yokohama Arena	Yokohama, Japan
6	K-1 World GP 2021 in Osaka	December 4, 2021	Osaka Prefectural Gymnasium	Osaka, Japan

== K-1: K’Festa 4 ==
K-1: K'Festa 4 was a kickboxing event held by K-1. It was originally scheduled to be held on January 24, 2021, at the Yoyogi National Gymnasium in Yoyogi, Japan, but was later postponed as the Japanese prime minister Yoshihide Suga declared a state of emergency for Tokyo, due to the COVID-19 pandemic. The event was rescheduled for two dates: March 21 and March 28, 2021, to be held at the Tokyo Garden Theater and Nippon Budokan, respectively.

=== Background ===
==== Originally scheduled fights ====
The event was supposed to be headlined by a match between the reigning K-1 Super Featherweight champion Takeru Segawa and the reigning Krush Super Featherweight champion Leona Pettas.

Former K-1 Heavyweight champion Kyotaro Fujimoto was to make his comeback to kickboxing, following a ten-year hiatus. He is scheduled to fight Kosuke Jitsutaka.

Former K-1 Super Lightweight champion Rukiya Anpo was scheduled to fight Kaito. Yuto Shinohara was set to face Yuma Saikyo, with both fighters coming off a two fight losing skid. Tomoya Yokoyama was to fight TETSU, while Akihiro Kaneko was set to fight Momotaro Kiyama.

2019 K-1 Featherweight GP finalist Jawsuayai Sor.Dechaphan was scheduled to fight Shuhei Kumura, while his brother Masashi Kumura was scheduled to fight Dansiam Ayothaya Fight Gym. The 2017 super welterweight finalist Yasuhiro Kido was scheduled to fight Daiki Matsushita. Former K-1 Super Lightweight champion Masaaki Noiri was scheduled to fight Yodkhunpon Sitmonchai.

The rest of the main card was rounded up with the following fights: Hiroki was to fight Ryuka at lightweight, Mio Tsumura was to fight Mako Yamada at a 46 kg catchweight, Kamlaiphet Pran26 was to fight Daisuke Fujimura at super welterweight, Petchseenil Sor.Puangthong was to fight Miho Takanashi at atomweight and Sina Karimian was to fight Seiya Tanigawa at cruiserweight.

== K'Festa 4 Day 1 ==
K-1: K’Festa 4 Day 1
- Promotion: K-1
- Date: March 21, 2021
- Venue: Tokyo Garden Theater
- City: Tokyo, Japan

=== March 21st event ===
The card will be headlined by a rematch between Yuki Egawa and Tatsuya Tsubakihara for the K-1 Featherweight title. The two previously fought at the K-1 World GP 2020 in Osaka, with Tsubakihara winning a majority decision.

In the co-main event, the K-1 Super Lightweight champion Hideaki Yamazaki is scheduled to fight Fukashi Mizutani in a non-title bout.

Former two-time Krush Welterweight title challenger Kaisei Kondo will face Maki Dwansonpong. K-1 and Krush Cruiserweight title challenger Hisaki Kato is scheduled to fight Mahmoud Sattari.

=== Fight Card ===
K-1: K'Festa 4 Day 1
Weight Class				Method	Round	Time	Notes
Featherweight 57.5 kg	(Japan) Tatsuya Tsubakihara	def.	(Japan) Yuki Egawa (c)	Ext.R Decision (Split)	4	3:00	For the K-1 Featherweight Championship.
Super Lightweight 65 kg	(Japan) Hideaki Yamazaki	def.	(Japan) Fukashi	KO (Left Jab)	1	1:10	
Super Featherweight 60 kg	(Japan) Yuta Murakoshi	def.	(Japan) Ryusei Ashizawa	Decision (Unanimous)	3	3:00	
Lightweight 63 kg	(Japan) Koya Urabe	def.	(Japan) Hikaru Hasumi	Decision (Unanimous)	3	3:00	
Catchweight 59 kg	(Japan) Tatsuki Shinotsuka	def.	(Japan) Kaito Ozawa	Ext.R Decision (Split)	4	3:00	
Welterweight 67.5 kg	(Japan) Kaisei Kondo	def.	(Thailand) Maki Dwansonpong	Decision (Majority)	3	3:00	
Cruiserweight 90 kg	(Iran) Mahmoud Sattari	def.	(Japan) Hisaki Kato	KO (Knee to the head)	2	0:26	
Super Lightweight 65 kg	(Brazil) Vitor Tofanelli	def.	(Japan) Hayato Suzuki	TKO (Doctor Stoppage)	3	1:28	
Cruiserweight 90 kg	(Japan) Seiya Tanigawa	def.	(Japan) RUI	Decision (Unanimous)	3	3:00	
Women's Atomweight 45 kg	(Japan) Miyuu Sugawara	def.	(Japan) Nozomi	Decision (Unanimous)	3	3:00	
Featherweight 57 kg	(Japan) Taito Gunji	def.	(Japan) Riku Morisaka	Decision (Unanimous)	3	3:00	
Lightweight 62.5 kg	(Japan) Shuji Kawarada	def.	(Japan) Hisaki Higashimoto	TKO	1	1:20	
Catchweight 75 kg	(Japan) Katsuya Jinbo	def.	(Brazil) Julio Cesar Mori	Decision (Unanimous)	3	3:00	
Preliminary Card
Featherweight 57 kg	(Japan) Yuta Matsuyama	def.	(Japan) Suizu Sora	KO (High Knee)	1	1:19	
Bantamweight 53 kg	(Japan) Koji Ikeda	def.	(Japan) Eiki kurata	KO (Right Cross)	2	1:55	
Bantamweight 53 kg	(Japan) Daiki Mine	def.	(Japan) Kyosuke Takahashi	KO (Punches)	3	1:19	
Super Featherweight 60 kg	(Japan) Natsuki Kitamura	draw	(Japan) Koki Akada	Decision (Majority)	3	3:00	

== K'Festa 4 Day 2 ==
K-1: K’Festa 4 Day 2
- Promotion: K-1
- Date: March 28, 2021
- Venue: Nippon Budokan
- City: Yoyogi, Japan

=== March 28th event ===
The main event bout between Takeru Segawa and Leona Pettas for the K-1 Super Featherweight Championship will serve as the headliner. The heavyweight bout between Kyotaro and Kosuke Jitsutaka was likewise rescheduled. The fight between the former K-1 Lightweight champion Rukiya Anpo and Kaito was scrapped, as Anpo was forced to withdraw due to injury. Yodkhunpon Sitmonchai, Dansiam AyothayaFightGym, Kamlaiphet Pran26 and Petchseenil Sor Puangthong will all be unable to compete due to travel restrictions caused by the COVID-19 pandemic. TETSU versus Tomoya Yokoyama, MIO versus Mako Yamada, Akihiro Kaneko versus Momotaro Kiyama and Hiroki versus Ryuka were all rescheduled for this event as well.

=== Fight Card ===
K-1: K'Festa 4 Day 2
Weight Class				Method	Round	Time	Notes
Super Featherweight 60 kg	(Japan) Takeru (c)	def.	(Japan) Leona Pettas	KO (Punches)	2	1:10	For the K-1 Super Featherweight Championship.
Cruiserweight 90 kg	(Iran) Sina Karimian	def.	(Japan) K-Jee (c)	KO (Spinning back fist)	2	2:05	For the K-1 Cruiserweight Championship.
Heavyweight 100 kg	(Japan) Kyotaro	def.	(Japan) Kosuke Jitsutaka	KO	2	0:29	
Cruiserweight 90 kg	(Japan) Animal Koji	def.	(Japan) Ryo Aitaka	Decision (Unanimous)	3	3:00	
Super Welterweight 70 kg	(Japan) Yasuhiro Kido	def.	(Japan) Daiki Matsushita	KO (Punches)	2	2:47	
Lightweight 63 kg	(Thailand) Gonnapar Weerasakreck	def.	(Japan) Daiki Nagumo	KO (Punches)	2	1:31	
Welterweight 67.5 kg	(Japan) Masaaki Noiri	def.	(Thailand) Phlaychumphon Sor. Srisomphong	Decision (Unanimous)	3	3:00	
Super Bantamweight 55 kg	(Japan) Masashi Kumura	def.	(Thailand) Dawsakhon Mor.Tassanai	KO (Right Cross)	2	1:56	
Lightweight 62.5 kg	(Japan) Yuma Saikyo	def.	(Japan) Yuto Shinohara	Decision (Split)	3	3:00	
Super Featherweight 60 kg	(Japan) Tomoya Yokoyama	def.	(Japan) Yusuke	KO (Left Cross)	1	0:29	
Super Bantamweight 55 kg	(Japan) Akihiro Kaneko	def.	(Japan) Momotaro Kiyama	TKO (Towel thrown)	3	2:36	
Super Featherweight 60 kg	(Japan) Kotaro Shimano	def.	(Japan) Yuki Miwa	Decision (Unanimous)	3	3:00	
Super Welterweight 70 kg	(Nepal) Abiral Ghimire	def.	(Japan) Kotetsu	KO (Punches & Knee)	1	2:21	
Super Welterweight 70 kg	(Philippines) Mike Joe	def.	(Japan) Eito	KO (Punches)	2	0:45	
Featherweight 57.5 kg	(Japan) Shuhei Kumura	def.	(Japan) Takahiro	Decision (Unanimous)	3	3:00	
Atomweight 48 kg	(Japan) Miho Takanashi	def.	(Japan) Mari	Ext.R Decision (Split)	4	3:00	
Catchweight 46 kg	(Japan) MIO	def.	(Japan) Mako Yamada	Decision (Unanimous)	3	3:00	
Welterweight 67.5 kg	(Ghana) Ayinta Ali	def.	(Japan) Kaito	KO (Right Cross)	3	2:30	
Lightweight 62.5 kg	(Japan) Ryuka	def.	(Japan) Hiroki	TKO (3 Knockdowns/Punches)	1	2:22	
Preliminary Card
Featherweight 57.5 kg	(Japan) Naoki Takahashi	def.	(Japan) Masafumi Kurasaki	TKO (Punches)	2	1:37	
Super Featherweight 60 kg	(Japan) Kazuki Sagegami	def.	(Japan) Kenshin Kodama	Decision (Unanimous)	3	3:00	
Women's Minimumweight	(Japan) Mirei	def.	(Belarus) Keito Weerasakreck	Decision (Unanimous)	3	3:00	
Lightweight 62.5 kg	(Japan) Koji Suzuki	def.	(Japan) Jin Hatori	KO (Punches)	1	1:19	

== K-1 World GP 2021: Japan Bantamweight Tournament ==
K-1 World GP 2021: Japan Bantamweight Tournament
- Promotion: K-1
- Date: May 30, 2021
- Venue: Yokohama Budokan
- City: Naka-ku, Yokohama, Japan

K-1 World GP 2021: Japan Bantamweight Tournament was a kickboxing event held by K-1 originally scheduled for May 23, 2021, at the Ota City General Gymnasium in Tokyo, Japan. Due to a state of emergancy imposed as a way to combat the COVID-19 pandemic, the event was later rescheduled for May 30, 2021, to be held at the Yokohama Budokan in Naka-ku, Yokohama, Japan.

=== Background ===
K-1 Featherweight champion Tatsuya Tsubakihara is expected to face Shuhei Kumura in a non-title bout.

Former K-1 Lightweight champion Kenta Hayashi was scheduled to fight Vitor Tofanelli.

The 2018 Super Featherweight champion Kotaro Shimano was set to fight Sano Tenma at super featherweight.

The event featured an eight-man bantamweight tournament, contested solely by Japanese fighters. Mao Hashimoto was later replaced by Naoki Ōmura.

Momotaro was scheduled to face Narufumi Nishimoto in a featherweight bout. A second featherweight bout announced for the event was contested by TOMA and Yusho Kanemoto.

Junki Sasaki was scheduled to fight in a 56 kg catchweight bout against Rat EiwaSportsGym, the highest he has ever weighed in at. Katsuya Jinbo was to fight Aqil Bukhari at a 75 kg catchweight.

Former Shootboxing Minimumweight champion Mio Tsumura was scheduled to fight the Krush atomweight champion Miyuu Sugawara. A second atomweight bout announced for the event was a matchup between MOE and Yu.

==== K-1 Japan Bantamweight Tournament bracket ====
Quarter-Finals
(Japan) Toma Kuroda	KO
(Japan) Koji Ikeda	1r.
(Japan) Hinata Matsumoto	UD
(Japan) Yuya Uzawa	R3
(Japan) Kazuki Miburo	MD
(Japan) Aoi Noda	3r.
(Japan) Naoki Omura	ER
(Japan) Shuto Hagiwara	4r.

Semi-Finals
(Japan) Toma Kuroda	UD
(Japan) Hinata Matsumoto	3r.
(Japan) Kazuki Miburo	ER
(Japan) Naoki Omura	4r.

Final
(Japan) Toma Kuroda	KO
(Japan) Kazuki Miburo	1r.

=== Fight Card ===
K-1 World GP 2021: Japan Bantamweight Tournament
Weight Class				Method	Round	Time	Notes
Bantamweight 53 kg	(Japan) Toma Kuroda	def.	(Japan) Kazuki Miburo	KO (Left Straight)	1	0:31	Japan Bantamweight Tournament Final.
Featherweight 57 kg	(Japan) Tatsuya Tsubakihara	def.	(Japan) Shuhei Kumura	Decision (Unanimous)	3	3:00	
Lightweight 62.5 kg	(Japan) Kenta Hayashi	def.	(Brazil) Vitor Tofanelli	TKO (Three knockdowns)	2	2:35	
Catchweight 56 kg	(Japan) Junki Sasaki	def.	(Thailand) Rat EiwaSportsGym	Decision (Unanimous)	3	3:00	
Women's Atomweight 45 kg	(Japan) MIO	def.	(Japan) Miyuu Sugawara	Decision (Majority)	3	3:00	
Bantamweight 53 kg	(Japan) Kazuki Miburo	def.	(Japan) Naoki Omura	Ext.R Decision (Unanimous)	4	3:00	Japan Bantamweight Tournament Semi Final.
Bantamweight 53 kg	(Japan) Toma Kuroda	def.	(Japan) Hinata Matsumoto	Decision (Unanimous)	3	3:00	Japan Bantamweight Tournament Semi Final.
Featherweight 60 kg	(Japan) Narufumi Nishimoto	def.	(Japan) Momotaro	TKO (Punches)	2	1:06	
Catchweight 75 kg	(Japan) Katsuya Jinbo	def.	(Japan) Aqil Bukhari	TKO (Punches)	1	1:09	
Super Featherweight 60 kg	(Japan) Tenma Sano	def.	(Japan) Kotaro Shimano	Decision (Unanimous)	3	3:00	
Featherweight 57 kg	(Japan) TOMA	def.	(Japan) Yusho Kanemoto	Decision (Unanimous)	3	3:00	
Women's Atomweight 45 kg	(Japan) Yu	def.	(Japan) MOE	Ext.R Decision (Unanimous)	4	3:00	
Bantamweight 53 kg	(Japan) Toma Kuroda	def.	(Japan) Koji Ikeda	KO (Knee)	2	2:10	Japan Bantamweight Tournament Quarter Final.
Bantamweight 53 kg	(Japan) Hinata Matsumoto	def.	(Japan) Yuya Uzawa	Decision (Unanimous)	3	3:00	Japan Bantamweight Tournament Quarter Final.
Bantamweight 53 kg	(Japan) Kazuki Miburo	def.	(Japan) Aoi Noda	Decision (Split)	3	3:00	Japan Bantamweight Tournament Quarter Final.
Bantamweight 53 kg	(Japan) Naoki Omura	def.	(Japan) Shuto Hagiwara	Ext.R Decision (Split)	4	3:00	Japan Bantamweight Tournament Quarter Final.
Preliminary Card
Super Featherweight 60 kg	(Japan) Haru Furumiya	def.	(Japan) Natsuki Kitamura	Decision (Unanimous)	3	3:00	

== K-1 World GP 2021 in Fukuoka ==
K-1 World GP 2021 in Fukuoka
- Promotion: K-1
- Date: July 17, 2021
- Venue: Fukuoka Convention Center
- City: Fukuoka, Japan

K-1 World GP 2021 in Fukuoka was a kickboxing event held by K-1 on July 17, 2021, at the Fukuoka Convention Center in Fukuoka, Japan.

=== Background ===
Gonnapar Weerasakreck was scheduled to make the first defense of his K-1 Lightweight Championship against Taio Asahisa.

Former K-1 Featherweight champion Yuki Egawa was scheduled to fight the two-time Krush Super Featherweight title challenger Tatsuya Oiwa. Egawa later withdrew from due bout due to COVID-19 protocols.

A lightweight bout between Koya Urabe and Fumiya Osawa was announced for the event. It was their fourth meeting, with Urabe having won two of their previous three bouts.

The co-main event saw the former K-1 Super Lightweight champion Rukiya Anpo was scheduled to fight Koki in a welterweight bout. The second welterweight bout saw Kota Nakano face Maki Dwansonpong.

A Cruiserweight bout between K-Jee and Ryo Aitaka was announced for the event.

A welterweight bout between Kota Nakano and Maki Dwansonpong was scheduled for the event.

BigBang Heavyweight champion Kosuke Jitsukata was scheduled to fight the undefeated Naoto Maruyama.

21-fight K-1 veteran Naoki Yamamoto was scheduled to fight Satoru Nariai at super featherweight.

Former Krush Super Featherweight champion Yuma Saikyo was scheduled to fight Tatsuki at lightweight.

A rematch between Miho Takanashi and MARI was announced for the event.

=== Fight Card ===
K-1 World GP 2021 in Fukuoka
Weight Class				Method	Round	Time	Notes
Lightweight 62.5 kg	(Japan) Taio Asahisa	def.	(Thailand) Kongnapa Weerasakreck (c)	Ext.R Decision (Split)	4	3:00	K-1 Lightweight Championship title.
Cruiserweight 90 kg	(Japan) K-Jee	def.	(Japan) Ryo Aitaka	KO (Low kick)	2	1:04	
Lightweight 62.5 kg	(Japan) Koya Urabe	def.	(Japan) Fumiya Osawa	Decision (Unanimous)	3	3:00	
Welterweight 67.5 kg	(Japan) Rukiya Anpo	def.	(Japan) Koki	KO (Punches)	1	0:53	
Exhibition	(Thailand) Maki Dwansonpong	ex.	(Japan) Tatsuya Oiwa		2	2:00	
Super Welterweight 70 kg	(Japan) Hiromi Wajima	def.	(Nepal) Abiral Himalayan Cheetah	KO (Low kicks)	3	2:23	
Super Heavyweight 100+ kg	(Japan) Kosuke Jitsukata	def.	(Japan) Naoto Maruyama	KO (Left High kick)	2	3:00	
Lightweight 62.5 kg	(Japan) Yuma Saikyo	def.	(Japan) Tatsuki	Decision (Unanimous)	3	3:00	
Super Featherweight 60 kg	(Japan) Naoki Yamamoto	def.	(Japan) Satoru Nariai	Decision (Unanimous)	3	3:00	
Minimumweight 48 kg	(Japan) Takanashi Knuckle Miho	def.	(Japan) MARI	Decision (Unnanimous)	3	3:00	
W. Atomweight 46 kg	(Japan) Mako Yamada	def.	(Japan) Nozomi	Decision (Unanimous)	3	3:00	
Featherweight 57 kg	(Japan) Takumi Terada	def.	(Japan) Naoki Takahashi	Decision (Unanimous)	3	3:00	
Super Lightweight 65 kg	(Japan) Fukashi	def.	(Japan) Yosuke Tamura	KO (3 Knockdowns/Punches)	1	1:53	
Preliminary Card
Flyweight 51 kg	(Japan) Tsubasa Yamawaki	def.	(Japan) Shohei Nishibayashi	Decision (Majority)	3	3:00	
Super Bantamweight 55 kg	(Japan) Lyra	def.	(Japan) Shion	TKO (3 Knockdowns)	1	2:40	
Lightweight 62.5 kg	(Japan) Kosei Kawakita	def.	(Japan) Yudai	KO (Right Cross)	2	1:15	

== K-1 World GP 2021: Yokohamatsuri ==
K-1 World GP 2021: Yokohamatsuri
- Promotion: K-1
- Date: September 20, 2021
- Venue: Yokohama Arena
- City: Yokohama, Japan

K-1 World GP 2021: Yokohamatsuri was a kickboxing event held by K-1 on September 20, 2021, at the Yokohama Arena in Yokohama, Japan.

=== Background ===
The former K-1 lightweight champion Kenta Hayashi was scheduled to face the reigning Krush Super Lightweight titleholder Daizo Sasaki in a super lightweight bout.

Newly crowned Krush Women's flyweight champion Kotomi was scheduled to face Rikako Sakurai in a 53 kg catchweight bout.

Kaito Ozawa was scheduled to face Yuta Kuneida in a featherweight bout.

Hirotaka Asahisa was scheduled to face MOMOTARO in a super featherweight bout. Ryusei Ashizawa was scheduled to face Hirotaka Urabe in the second super featherweight bout of the main card.

A rematch between Yasuhiro Kido and Yutaro Yamauchi at super welterweight was announced for the event, eight years after their first meeting, which Kido won by unanimous decision.,

MMA veteran and Olympic Judo gold medalist Satoshi Ishii was scheduled to make his kickboxing debut against Ryo Aitaka in a super heavyweight bout.

Former K-1 heavyweight champion Kyotaro Fujimoto was scheduled to face the reigning K-1 Cruiserweight champion Sina Karimian in a heavyweight bout.

A one-night welterweight world Grand Prix was held during the event, featuring eight competitors: Rukiya Anpo, Alan Soares, Riki Matsuoka, Maki Dwansonpong, Kona Kato, Masaaki Noiri, Ruku Kojima and Ali Ayinta. On September 8, 2021, it was revealed that Kona Kato had to withdraw from his bout due to COVID-19 related reasons, and was replaced by FUMIYA. Daiku Kazuki was rescheduled to face Darvish Kurogi.

Toshiki Taniyama was scheduled to face the former Krush lightweight champion Yuto Shinohara in a lightweight bout.

A featherweight bout between the reigning Krush Featherweight champion Takahito Niimi and two-time Krush Super Bantamweight title challenger Taito Gunji was announced for the event.

Tatsuki Shinotsuka was scheduled to make his sophomore appearance against Toma Tanabe in a featherweight bout.

A bantamweight bout between two former Krush bantamweight champions, Koki and Akihiro Kaneko, was announced for the main card.

==== K-1 Welterweight Grand Prix bracket ====
Quarter-Finals
(Ghana) Ayinta Ali	UD
(Japan) Ruku Kojima	R3.
(Japan) Masaaki Noiri	KO
(Japan) FUMIYA	1r
(Japan) Rukiya Anpo	KO
(Brazil) Alan Soares	1r.
(Japan) Riki Matsuoka	ER
(Thailand) Maki Duangsompong	4r.

Semi-Finals
(Japan) Masaaki Noiri	KO
(Ghana) Ayinta Ali	1r.
(Japan) Rukiya Anpo	KO
(Japan) Riki Matsuoka	3r.

Final
(Japan) Masaaki Noiri	KO
(Japan) Rukiya Anpo	3r.

=== Fight Card ===
K-1 World GP 2021 in Yohomatsuri
Weight Class				Method	Round	Time	Notes
Welterweight 67.5 kg	(Japan) Masaaki Noiri	def.	(Japan) Rukiya Anpo	TKO (Three knockdowns)	3	2:51	Welterweight World GP Final.
Heavyweight 100 kg	(Iran) Sina Karimian	def.	(Japan) Kyotaro Fujimoto	Ext. R. Decision (Split)	4	3:00	
Super Lightweight 65 kg	(Japan) Daizo Sasaki	def.	(Japan) Kenta Hayashi	Decision (Unanimous)	3	3:00	
Super Featherweight 60 kg	(Japan) Ryusei Ashizawa	def.	(Japan) Hirotaka Urabe	Decision (Unanimous)	3	3:00	
Super Featherweight 60 kg	(Japan) Yuta Murakoshi	def.	(Japan) Narufumi Nishimoto	Decision (Unanimous)	3	3:00	
Super Featherweight 60 kg	(Japan) Hirotaka Asahisa	def.	(Japan) MOMOTARO	KO (Left hook)	1	2:59	
Super Welterweight 70 kg	(Japan) Yasuhiro Kido	def.	(Japan) Yutaro Yamauchi	TKO (Three knockdowns)	2	2:25	
Super Heavyweight 100+ kg	(Croatia) Satoshi Ishii	def.	(Japan) Ryo Aitaka	Ext. R. Decision (Unanimous)	4	3:00	
Welterweight 67.5 kg	(Japan) Rukiya Anpo	def.	(Japan) Riki Matsuoka	KO (Body shot)	3	2:35	Welterweight World GP Semifinal.
Welterweight 67.5 kg	(Japan) Masaaki Noiri	def.	(Ghana) Ali Ayinta	TKO (Two knockdowns)	1	1:32	Welterweight World GP Semifinal.
Featherweight 57.5 kg	(Japan) Kaito Ozawa	def.	(Japan) Yuta Kunieda	Decision (Unanimous)	3	3:00	
Featherweight 57.5 kg	(Japan) Taito Gunji	def.	(Japan) Takahito Niimi	Decision (Unanimous)	3	3:00	
Featherweight 57.5 kg	(Japan) Toma Tanabe	def.	(Japan) Yusuke	KO (Left straight)	2	2:05	
Catchweight Women 53 kg	(Japan) Kotomi	def.	(Japan) Rikako Sakurai	Decision (Unanimous)	3	3:00	
Super Bantamweight 55 kg	(Japan) Akihiro Kaneko	def.	(Japan) Koki	TKO (Three knockdowns)	1	2:35	
Lightweight 62.5 kg	(Japan) Yuto Shinohara	def.	(Japan) Toshiki Taniyama	Decision (Unanimous)	3	3:00	
Lightweight 62.5 kg	(Japan) Ryuka	def.	(Japan) Hasumi Hikaru	KO (Head kick)	2	1:48	
Welterweight 67.5 kg	(Japan) Riki Matsuoka	def.	(Thailand) Maki Dwansonpong	TKO (Two knockdowns)	2	3:00	Welterweight World GP Quarterfinal.
Welterweight 67.5 kg	(Japan) Rukiya Anpo	def.	(Brazil) Alan Soares	TKO (Two knockdowns)	1	0:31	Welterweight World GP Quarterfinal.
Welterweight 67.5 kg	(Japan) Masaaki Noiri	def.	(Japan) FUMIYA	KO (Right hook)	1	2:10	Welterweight World GP Quarterfinal.
Welterweight 67.5 kg	(Ghana) Ayinta Ali	def.	(Japan) Ruku Kojima	Decision (Unanimous)	3	3:00	Welterweight World GP Quarterfinal.
Preliminary Card
Welterweight 67.5 kg	(Japan) Daiku Kazuki	def.	(Japan) Darvish Kurogi	KO (Right straight)	1	2:45	Welterweight World GP Reserve Fight.
Welterweight 67.5 kg	(Japan) Takahiko Kobayashi	def.	(Japan) Takuma Shimizu	KO (Right straight)	2	2:10	

== K-1 World GP 2021 in Osaka ==
K-1 World GP 2021 in Osaka
- Promotion: K-1
- Date: December 4, 2021
- Venue: Osaka Prefectural Gymnasium
- City: Osaka, Japan

K-1 World GP 2021 in Osaka was a kickboxing event held by K-1 on December 4, 2021, at the Osaka Prefectural Gymnasium in Osaka, Japan.

=== Background ===
A K-1 Featherweight Championship bout between the reigning champion Tatsuya Tsubakihara and title challenger Taito Gunji was announced as the main event.

=== Fight Card ===
K-1 World GP 2021 Japan
Weight Class				Method	Round	Time	Notes
Super Welterweight 70 kg	(Japan) Hiromi Wajima	def.	(Brazil) Minoru Kimura	KO (Body kick)	3	2:50	For the K-1 Super Welterweight Championship.
Featherweight 57.5 kg	(Japan) Taito Gunji	def.	(Japan) Tatsuya Tsubakihara	Ext R. Decision (Split)	4	3:00	For the K-1 Featherweight Championship.
Super Lightweight 65 kg	(Japan) Kenta Hayashi	def.	(Japan) Fukashi Mizutani	Decision (Unanimous)	3	3:00	
Lightweight 62.5 kg	(Thailand) Gonnapar Weerasakreck	def.	(Japan) Yuma Saikyo	Decision (Majority)	3	3:00	
Welterweight 67.5 kg	(Japan) Rukiya Anpo	def.	(Japan) Kaito	KO (Punches)	1	1:52	
Super Heavyweight 100+ kg	(Croatia) Satoshi Ishii	def.	(Japan) Rui	Decision (Unanimous)	3	3:00	
Catchweight 61.5 kg	(Japan) Leona Pettas	def.	(Thailand) Maki Chatchai	Decision (Unanimous)	3	3:00	
Super Lightweight 65 kg	(Japan) Tetsuya Yamato	def.	(Japan) Yujiro Ono	KO (Punches)	3	0:28	
Featherweight 57.5 kg	(Japan) Shuhei Kumura	def.	(Japan) Kizaemon Saiga	KO (Right Cross)	1	1:07	
Featherweight 57.5 kg	(Japan) Toma Tanabe	def.	(Japan) Riku Morisaka	Decision (Unanimous)	3	3:00	
Catchweight 52.5 kg	(Japan) SAHO	def.	(Japan) Mahiro	Decision (Unanimous)	3	3:00	
Bantamweight 53 kg	(Japan) Toma Kuroda	def.	(Japan) Kazuki Miburo	Ext.R Decision (Unanimous)	4	3:00	
Lightweight 62.5 kg	(Japan) Fumiya Osawa	def.	(Japan) Hiroki	Ext.R Decision (Unanimous)	4	3:00	
Cruiserweight 90 kg	(Japan) Seiya Tanigawa	def.	(Japan) Yuki Kudo	KO (Head kick)	2	2:11	
Women's Minimumweight 48 kg	(Japan) Miho Takanashi	def.	(Japan) Mirei	Decision (Unanimous)	3	3:00	
Lightweight 62.5 kg	(Japan) Yuto Shinohara	def.	(Japan) Katsuki Ishida	Decision (Unanimous)	3	3:00	
Catchweight 73 kg	(Japan) Katsuya Jinbo	def.	(Japan) EITO	TKO (Three knockdowns)	1	1:37	
Preliminary Card
Catchweight 51 kg	(Japan) Daina	def.	(Japan) Tsubasa Yamawaki	Decision (Unanimous)	3	3:00	
Super Featherweight 60 kg	(Japan) Haru Furumiya	def.	(Japan) Sergio Hano	Decision (Unanimous)	3	3:00	
Featherweight 57.5 kg	(Japan) Ryota Ishida	vs.	(Japan) Takaya Komatsu				
Lightweight 62.5 kg	(Japan) Yuya Miyake	def.	(Japan) Rioya	TKO (Head kick and punches)	2	0:36	

== See also ==
- 2021 in Glory
- 2021 in ONE Championship
- 2021 in Romanian kickboxing
- 2021 in Wu Lin Feng
