= Tenma Sano =

Japanese flyweight kickboxer

Sano Tenma
- Born: July 25, 1997 (age 29); Fujisawa, Kanagawa Prefecture, Japan
- Native name: 佐野天馬
- Height: 1.72 m (5 ft 7 1/2 in)
- Weight: 60 kg (130 lb; 9.4 st)
- Style: Kickboxing, Karate
- Stance: Orthodox
- Fighting out of: Kanagawa Prefecture, Japan
- Team: K-1 Gym Sagami-Ono KREST

Kickboxing record
- Total: 34
- Wins: 22
- By knockout: 3
- Losses: 11
- Draws: 1

Sano Tenma (佐野天馬, born July 25, 1997) is a Japanese kickboxer who has fought in K-1, Krush, and Glory of Heroes.

== Championships and awards ==
Professional

- Bigbang
  - 2017 Bigbang Featherweight Champion (1 defense)
- Krush
  - 2014 Krush -55 kg Rookie of the Year Tournament Winner

Amateur

- 2014 K-1 Koshien Tournament Runner-up
- 2013 Shin Karate All Japan G-1 Grand Prix Lightweight Champion
- 2012 Shin Karate All Japan G-3 Grand Prix Middle School 60 kg Champion
- 2011 Shin Karate 207th Tokyo K-3 Tournament -48 kg Winner
- 2010 Shin Karate 160th K-3 Tournament -48 kg Winner

== Kickboxing record ==
Kickboxing record
23 Wins (4 (T)KO's), 12 Losses, 1 Draw
Date	Result	Opponent	Event	Location	Method	Round	Time
2026-08-02	Win	(Japan) Masahiro Miyamoto	BOM 51	Yokohama, Japan	Decision (High kick)	1	1:30
2025-11-02	Loss	(Japan) Shota Meguro	Super Bigbang 2025	Yokohama, Japan	Ext.R Decision (Unanimous)	4	3:00
For the BigBang Lightweight title.
2025-07-26	Win	(Japan) Kiyomitsu Samuel Nagasawa	Krush 178	Tokyo, Japan	Decision (Unanimous)	3	3:00
2025-03-30	Win	(Japan) Kazuki Matsumoto	Krush 172	Tokyo, Japan	Decision (Unanimous)	3	3:00
2024-07-20	Loss	(China) Zhang Haiyang	Extreme Fighting competition 7	Changsha, China	Decision (Unanimous)	3	3:00
2023-12-17	Loss	(Japan) Koya Saito	Krush 156	Tokyo, Japan	Decision (Unanimous)	3	3:00
2022-03-20	Draw	(Thailand) Kiewsongsaen Flyskygym	Big Bang 41	Tokyo, Japan	Decision	3	3:00
2021-05-30	Win	(Japan) Kotaro Shimano	K-1 World GP 2021: Japan Bantamweight Tournament	Tokyo, Japan	Decision (Unanimous)	3	3:00
2020-03-28	Loss	(Japan) Naoki Yamamoto	Krush.112	Tokyo, Japan	Ext.R Decision (Unanimous)	4	3:00
2019-11-08	Loss	(Japan) Takahito Niimi	Krush 107	Tokyo, Japan	Decision (Majority)	3	3:00
2019-08-31	Win	(Japan) Riku Morisaka	Krush 104	Tokyo, Japan	Decision (Unanimous)	3	3:00
2019-02-16	Loss	(Japan) Tetsuji Noda	Krush.98	Tokyo, Japan	Decision (Majority)	3	3:00
2018-11-04	Win	(Japan) Ryo Pegasus	Bigbang Isehara 2018	Tokyo, Japan	KO (Knee to the head)	2	0:49
Defends the BigBang Featherweight title.
2018-07-28	Loss	(China) Wang Junguang	Glory of Heroes 33: Shanghai	Shanghai, China	Decision (Unanimous)	3	3:00
2018-06-03	Win	(Japan) Kenichi Takeuchi	Bigbang 33	Tokyo, Japan	Decision (Split)	3	3:00
2018-03-10	Loss	(Japan) Ryusei Ashizawa	Krush.86	Tokyo, Japan	Decision (Majority)	3	3:00
2017-12-03	Win	(Japan) Ryo Pegasus	Bigbang 31	Tokyo, Japan	Decision (Unanimous)	3	3:00
Wins the BigBang Featherweight title.
2017-09-03	Win	(Japan) Yu Wor.Wanchai	Bigbang 30	Tokyo, Japan	KO (Left Body Kick)	2	1:22
2017-07-16	Win	(China) Yun Qi	Krush 77	Tokyo, Japan	Decision (Unanimous)	3	3:00
2017-05-13	Win	(Japan) Yuzuki Satomi	KHAOS 2	Tokyo, Japan	Decision (Unanimous)	3	3:00
2017-02-18	Loss	(Japan) Taio Asahisa	Krush.73	Tokyo, Japan	Decision (Unanimous)	3	3:00
2016-10-15	Win	(Japan) Yuki Matsuno	Krush.70	Tokyo, Japan	Decision (Unanimous)	3	3:00
2016-07-18	Loss	(Japan) Shota Kanbe	Krush.67	Tokyo, Japan	Decision (Unanimous)	3	3:00
2016-03-20	Loss	(Japan) Hirotaka Asahisa	Krush.64	Tokyo, Japan	Decision (Unanimous)	3	3:00
2016-01-07	Win	(Japan) Ryuma Tobe	Krush.62	Tokyo, Japan	Decision (Unanimous)	3	3:00
2015-11-14	Win	(Japan) Tomoya Aoki	Krush.60	Tokyo, Japan	KO (Left Hook & Knee to the Body)	2	2:48
2015-01-04	Win	(Japan) Yoshiki Takei	Krush.49	Tokyo, Japan	Decision (Majority)	3	3:00
2014-06-07	Win	(Japan) Keisuke Ishida	Krush-EX 2014 vol.4	Tokyo, Japan	Decision (Majority)	3	3:00
Wins Krush 2014 Rookie of the Year Tournament -55kg title.
2014-06-07	Win	(Japan) Shi-mo	Krush-EX 2014 vol.4	Tokyo, Japan	Decision (Unanimous)	3	3:00
2014-04-06	Win	(Japan) Satoru	Krush-EX 2014 vol.3	Tokyo, Japan	Decision (Unanimous)	3	3:00
2014-02-14	Win	(Japan) Ryota	Krush 38	Tokyo, Japan	Decision (Unanimous)	3	3:00
2013-12-14	Win	(Japan) Yu Thong A	Krush 35	Tokyo, Japan	Decision (Unanimous)	3	3:00
2013-10-13	Win	(Japan) Sho Ikeno	Krush-IGNITION 2013 vol.6	Tokyo, Japan	Decision (Unanimous)	3	3:00
2013-09-21	Win	(Japan) Shusei Hamada	Krush 33	Tokyo, Japan	Decision (Unanimous)	3	3:00
2013-07-013	Win	(Japan) Takayuki Minamino	Krush-IGNITION 2013 vol.5	Japan	Decision (Majority)	3	3:00
Legend: Win Loss Draw/No contest Notes

Amateur Kickboxing Record
Date	Result	Opponent	Event	Location	Method	Round	Time
2014-11-03	Loss	(Japan) Ren Hiramoto	K-1 World GP 2014 -65kg Championship Tournament	Tokyo, Japan	Decision (Unanimous)	3	3:00
For the 2014 K-1 Koshien Title.
2014-07-21	Win	(Japan) Hirotaka Asahisa	K-1 Koshien 2014 Tournament, Semi Final	Tokyo, Japan	Decision (Unanimous)	1	2:00
2014-07-21	Win	(Japan) Takayuki Minamino	K-1 Koshien 2014 Tournament, Quarter Final	Tokyo, Japan	Extra Round Decision (Split)	2	2:00
2014-07-21	Win	(Japan) Yuta Kuwano	K-1 Koshien 2014 Tournament, Second Round	Tokyo, Japan	Decision	1	2:00
2014-07-21	Win	(Japan) Yuya Saito	K-1 Koshien 2014 Tournament, First Round	Tokyo, Japan	Decision (Unanimous)	1	2:00
Legend: Win Loss Draw/No contest Notes
