= Kiyomitsu Samuel Nagasawa =

Japanese male kickboxer

- Born: 永澤サムエル聖光; 10 November 1989 (age 36); Yoshimi, Saitama, Japan
- Nationality: Japanese; Bolivian
- Height: 1.70 m (5 ft 7 in)
- Weight: 62.5 kg (138 lb; 9 st 12 lb)
- Style: Muay Thai, Kickboxing
- Stance: Orthodox
- Fighting out of: Saitama, Japan
- Team: B Make; Victory Gym (former)

Kickboxing record
- Total: 51
- Wins: 33
- By knockout: 14
- Losses: 14
- Draws: 4

Kiyomitsu Samuel Nagasawa is a Japanese kickboxer, currently competing in the lightweight division of K-1 where he is the reigning K-1 Lightweight champion.

As of September 2026 he was the No. 2 ranked -64 kg kickboxer in the world by Beyond Kickboxing

== Career ==
=== Shin Nihon Kickboxing Association ===
Nagasawa made his professional debut on April 8, 2012, at SNKA "Superkick" against Koichi Ashima. He won the fight by unanimous decision.

For his second professional fight Nagasawa faced Choji Horiguchi at SNKA SLEDGE HAMMER IV on June 10, 2012. The fight ended in a draw.

On November 24, 2013, Nagasawa faced Daiju Takahira at SNKA Kick Insist III. He won the fight by first round knockout.

Nagasawa defeated Lee Jin Fan by unanimous decision at the SNKA Super Kick Boxing event on April 6, 2014.

On January 11, 2015, Nagasawa faced Naoya Fukuda at SNKA WINNERS 2015 1st. He won the fight by unanimous decision.

On March 15, 2015, Nagasawa challenged Katsuji at SNKA MAGNUM 37 for the vacant SNKA Lightweight title. He lost the fight by third-round technical knockout.

On May 17, 2015, Nagasawa faced Kyohei at SNKA WINNERS 2015 2nd. He lost the fight by majority decision.

On May 15, 2016, Nagasawa faced Naoto at SNKA WINNERS 2016 2nd. The fight ended in a split draw.

Nagasawa challenged Katsuji at SNKA MAGNUM 41 for his SNKA Lightweight title on July 3, 2016. He lost the fight by unanimous decision.

On November 6, 2016, Nagasawa faced Takuma at SNKA Kick Insist 6. He won the fight by majority decision.

On May 14, 2017, Nagasawa faced Monkongdet Sit-Ubon at SNKA WINNERS 2017 2nd. He won the fight by decision.

On November 19, 2017, Nagasawa faced Taimu Saenchaigym at SNKA Kick Insist 7. He won the fight by majority decision.

On January 7, 2018, Nagasawa faced Yodphet JSK at SNKA WINNERS 2018 1st. He won the fight by unanimous decision.

=== Japan Kickboxing Association / WBC Muay Thai ===
On June 12, 2019, Nagasawa faced Shunsuke Miyabi at the Suk Wan Kingthong Go to the Raja event for the vacant Suk Wan Kingthong Lightweight title. He lost the fight by unanimous decision.

On January 5, 2020, Nagasawa faced Konosuke at JKA KICK ORIGIN 2010 1st for the inaugural JKA Lightweight title. He won the fight by third-round knockout.

On September 12, 2020, Nagasawa faced Shoya Suzuki at NJKF 2020 3rd for the vacant WBC Muay Thai Japan Lightweight title. He won the fight by unanimous decision.

On November 22, 2020, Nagasawa lost by unanimous decision to Sila Y'zd at JKA Kick Insist 10.

Morii faced Nagasawa Samuel Kiyomitsu at NO KICK NO LIFE ~Shin Shou~ Ungaisouten on February 24, 2021. He won the fight by a majority decision, with scores of 30–28, 29–29 and 30–29.

On February 12, 2022, Nagasawa successfully defended his WBC Muay Thai Japan Lightweight title against Kenta Yamada, defeating him by unanimous decision at NJKF 2022 1st.

On March 20, 2022, Nagasawa faced Paranrak FellowGym at JKA Kick Insist 12. He won the fight by unanimous decision.

On July 17, 2022, Nagasawa faced Kongdet Por.Pajansee at JKA Kick Insist 13 for the vacant WMO International Lightweight title. He won the fight by unanimous decision.

Nagasawa faced Isannua Chotbangsaen at RWS Japan on February 12, 2024. He lost the fight by unanimous decision.

=== Krush / K-1 ===
Nagasawa faced Yuzuki Satomi at Krush 164 on August 18, 2024. He lost the fight by a first-round knockout.

On November 16, 2024, Nagasawa faced Shuji Kawarada at Krush 167. He won the fight by unanimous decision.

On February 24, 2025, Nagasawa enterd an 8-man tournament at Krush 171. In the quarterfinals he lost by unanimous decision to Haru Furumiya.

Nagasawa defeated Kuto Ueno by extension round unanimous decision on September 7, 2025, at K-1 World MAX 2025 - World Tournament Opening Round.

On February 8, 2026, Nagasawa faced Yuma Saikyo at K-1 World GP 2026 - 90kg World Tournament|. He won the fight by first-round knockout with body punches.

On May 31, 2026, Nagasawa faced reigning Krush champion Tatsuya Oiwa at K-1 Revenge. He won the fight by unanimous decision.

On September 12, 2026, Nagasawa challenged Yuzuki Satomi for his K-1 Lightweight (-62.5kg) title at K-1 World MAX 2026 - World Tournament Opening Round. He won the fight by second-round technical knockout after surviving a first-round knockdown.

== Titles and accomplishments ==
=== Muay Thai ===
- Japan Kickboxing Association
  - 2020 JKA Lightweight Champion
- World Boxing Council
  - 2020 WBC Muay Thai Japan Lightweight Champion
    - One successful title defense
- World Muaythai Organization
  - 2022 WMO international Lightweight Champion

=== Kickboxing ===
- K-1
  - 2026 K-1 Lightweight (-62.5kg) Champion

== Fight record ==
Professional Muay Thai Kickboxing record
33 Wins (14 (T)KO's), 14 Losses, 4 Draws
Date	Result	Opponent	Event	Location	Method	Round	Time
2026-12-29		(Japan) Kouzi	K-1 World MAX 2026 - World Championship Tournament Final	Yokohama, Japan			
Defending the K-1 Lightweight (-62.5kg) title.
2026-09-12	Win	(Japan) Yuzuki Satomi	K-1 World MAX 2026 - World Tournament Opening Round	Tokyo, Japan	TKO (referee stoppage)	2	1:41
Wins the K-1 Lightweight (-62.5kg) title.
2026-05-31	Win	(Japan) Tatsuya Oiwa	K-1 Revenge	Tokyo, Japan	Decision (unanimous)	3	3:00
2026-02-08	Win	(Japan) Yuma Saikyo	K-1 World GP 2026 - 90kg World Tournament	Tokyo, Japan	KO (body punches)	1	1:46
2025-09-07	Win	(Japan) Kuto Ueno	K-1 World MAX 2025 - World Tournament Opening Round	Tokyo, Japan	Ext.R Decision (unanimous)	4	3:00
2025-07-26	Loss	(Japan) Tenma Sano	Krush 178	Tokyo, Japan	Decision (unanimous)	3	3:00
2025-02-24	Loss	(Japan) Haru Furumiya	Krush 171 - Lightweight Grand Prix, Quarterfinals	Tokyo, Japan	Decision (unanimous)	3	3:00
2024-11-16	Win	(Japan) Shuji Kawarada	Krush 167	Tokyo, Japan	Decision (unanimous)	3	3:00
2024-08-18	Loss	(Japan) Yuzuki Satomi	Krush 164	Tokyo, Japan	KO (punches)	1	1:57
2024-02-12	Loss	(Thailand) Isannua Chotbangsaen	RWS Japan	Tokyo, Japan	Decision (unanimous)	3	3:00
2023-11-26	Draw	(Thailand) Pinsiam Sor.Amnuaysirichoke	JKA Kick Insist 17	Tokyo, Japan	Decision (majority)	3	3:00
2023-07-16	Win	(Thailand) Kennakorn Dabransarakham	JKA Kick Insist 16	Tokyo, Japan	TKO (low kicks)	2	2:22
2023-03-19	Win	(Thailand) Petchpupan Sor.Saknarin	JKA Kick Insist 15	Tokyo, Japan	TKO (low kicks)	2	2:22
2022-11-20	Win	(Thailand) Khomkaew Sit PorChorWor	JKA Kick Insist 14	Tokyo, Japan	KO (right cross)	3	1:52
2022-07-17	Win	(Thailand) Kongdet Por.Pajansee	JKA Kick Insist 13	Tokyo, Japan	Decision (unanimous)	5	3:00
Wins the vacant WMO International Lightweight title.
2022-03-20	Win	(Thailand) Paranrak FellowGym	JKA Kick Insist 12	Tokyo, Japan	Decision (unanimous)	5	3:00
2022-02-12	Win	(Japan) Kenta Yamada	NJKF 2022 1st	Tokyo, Japan	Decision (unanimous)	5	3:00
Defends the WBC Muay Thai Japan Lightweight title.
2021-11-21	Win	(Thailand) Thongmeechai FellowGym	JKA Kick Insist 11	Tokyo, Japan	KO (left hook)	2	1:50
2021-06-13	Win	(Thailand) Lakchai GTgym	Suk Wan Kingthong: Let’s do our best！	Tokyo, Japan	Decision (unanimous)	3	3:00
2021-02-24	Loss	(Japan) Yosuke Morii	NO KICK NO LIFE ~Shin Shou~ Ungaisouten	Tokyo, Japan	Decision (majority)	3	3:00
2020-11-22	Loss	(Thailand) Sila Y'zd	JKA Kick Insist 10	Tokyo, Japan	Decision (unanimous)	3	3:00
2020-09-12	Win	(Japan) Shoya Suzuki	NJKF 2020 3rd	Tokyo, Japan	Decision (unanimous)	5	3:00
Wins the vacant WBC Muay Thai Japan Lightweight title.
2020-01-05	Win	(Japan) Konosuke	JKA KICK ORIGIN 2010 1st	Tokyo, Japan	TKO (referee stoppage)	3	1:49
Wins the inanugural JKA Lightweight title.
2019-11-09	Win	(Japan) Kenjiro Tanahashi	JKA Kick Insist 9	Tokyo, Japan	TKO (doctor stoppage)	3	2:29
2019-06-12	Loss	(Japan) Shunsuke Miyabi	Suk Wan Kingthong Go to the Raja	Tokyo, Japan	Decision (unanimous)	5	3:00
For the vacant Suk Wan Kingthong Lightweight title.
2018-11-11	Win	(Thailand) Mai Lookprabaht	SNKA Kick Insist 8	Tokyo, Japan	KO (left hook)	3	2:10
2018-08-23	Win	(Thailand) Jackchai Nor.Naksin	Suk Wan Kingthong	Tokyo, Japan	KO (left hook to the body)	2	
2018-05-14	Loss	(Japan) Masayuki Uchida	SNKA WINNERS 2018 2nd	Tokyo, Japan	TKO (doctor stoppage)	3	2:40
2018-01-07	Loss	(Thailand) Yodphet JSK	SNKA WINNERS 2018 1st	Tokyo, Japan	Decision (unanimous)	3	3:00
2017-11-19	Win	(Japan) Taimu Saenchaigym	SNKA Kick Insist 7	Tokyo, Japan	Decision (majority)	3	3:00
2017-08-27	Win	(Japan) Ken Hasegawa	SNKA WINNERS 2017 3rd	Tokyo, Japan	Decision (unanimous)	3	3:00
2017-05-14	Win	(Thailand) Monkongdet Sit-Ubon	SNKA WINNERS 2017 2nd	Tokyo, Japan	Decision	3	3:00
2016-11-06	Win	(Japan) Takuma	SNKA Kick Insist 6	Tokyo, Japan	Decision (majority)	3	3:00
2016-07-03	Loss	(Japan) Katsuji	SNKA MAGNUM 41	Tokyo, Japan	Decision (unanimous)	5	3:00
For the SNKA Lightweight title.
2016-05-15	Draw	(Japan) Naoto	SNKA WINNERS 2016 2nd	Tokyo, Japan	Decision (split)	3	3:00
2015-11-15	Loss	(Japan) Katsushi Muranaka	SNKA Kick Insist 5	Tokyo, Japan	KO (high kick)	3	2:18
2015-07-12	Win	(Japan) Tadashi Kaneko	SNKA MAGNUM 38	Tokyo, Japan	KO (straight to the body)	1	1:22
2015-05-17	Loss	(Japan) Kyohei	SNKA WINNERS 2015 2nd	Tokyo, Japan	Decision (majority)	3	3:00
2015-03-15	Loss	(Japan) Katsuji	SNKA MAGNUM 37	Tokyo, Japan	TKO (corner stoppage)	3	1:56
For the vacant SNKA Lightweight title.
2015-01-11	Win	(Japan) Naoya Fukuda	SNKA WINNERS 2015 1st	Tokyo, Japan	Decision (unanimous)	3	3:00
2014-11-16	Win	(Japan) Ryota	SNKA Kick Insist 4	Tokyo, Japan	Decision (unanimous)	3	3:00
2014-07-20	Win	(Japan) Haruki	SNKA MAGNUM 35	Tokyo, Japan	Decision (unanimous)	3	3:00
2014-04-06	Win	(South Korea) Lee Jin Fan	SNKA Super Kick Boxing	Chiba, Japan	Decision (unanimous)	3	3:00
2013-11-24	Win	(Japan) Daiju Takahira	SNKA Kick Insist III	Tokyo, Japan	KO	1	1:10
2013-09-16	Win	(Japan) Kazuki	SNKA TITANS NEOS XIV	Tokyo, Japan	KO	2	1:39
2013-04-07	Draw	(South Korea) Fang In Woo	SNKA Super Kick Boxing	Ichihara, Chiba, Japan	Decision (majority)	3	3:00
2012-11-25	Loss	(Japan) Ikuo Saiki	SNKA Kick Insist Ⅱ	Tokyo, Japan	Decision (unanimous)	2	3:00
2012-06-10	Draw	(Japan) Choji Horiguchi	SNKA SLEDGE HAMMER IV	Tokyo, Japan	Decision (unanimous)	2	3:00
2012-04-08	Win	(Japan) Koichi Ashima	SNKA Super Kick	Ichihara, Chiba, Japan	Decision (unanimous)	2	3:00
Legend: Win Loss Draw/No contest Notes

== See also ==
- List of male kickboxers
