= Kenta Hayashi =

Japanese kickboxer (born 1994)

Hayashi Kenta
- Born: 林 健太; August 17, 1994 (age 32); Kakogawa, Hyōgo, Japan
- Other names: Bad Fist
- Height: 1.72 m (5 ft 7 1/2 in)
- Weight: 65 kg (143 lb; 10.2 st)
- Division: Featherweight
- Style: Kickboxing, karate
- Stance: Orthodox
- Fighting out of: Japan
- Team: K-1 Gym Sagami-Ono KREST (2013-2019); FLYSKY GYM (2018-present)
- Years active: 2013–present

Kickboxing record
- Total: 38
- Wins: 22
- By knockout: 15
- Losses: 14
- By knockout: 7
- Draws: 2

Kenta Hayashi (林 健太, Hayashi Kenta; born 17 August 1994) is a Japanese kickboxer, currently competing in the super lightweight division of K-1. A professional competitor since 2013, he is the former Bigbang and K-1 lightweight champion, as well as the 2018 K-1 World Grand Prix winner.

Combat Press ranked him in the super bantamweight top ten between September 2020 and June 2021. He was ranked in the bantamweight top ten between January 2019 and August 2020, peaking at #1 between June 2019 and April 2020.

== Kickboxing career ==
=== Krush ===
==== Early career ====
Hayashi made his Krush debut against Shoki Nishikawa at Krush.31 on August 25, 2013. He won by a first-round knockout.

Hayashi was scheduled to face Kyohei Hayashi at Krush-IGNITION 2013 vol.7 on October 13, 2013. He won the fight by a first-round knockout.

Hayashi was scheduled to face Takashi Ohata at Krush.35 on December 14, 2013. He once again won by a first-round knockout.

Hayashi was scheduled to face Sei Ono at Krush.38 on February 14, 2014. He won the fight by unanimous decision, with scores of 30–28, 30-27 and 30–29.

Hayashi took part in the 2016 Krush featherweight tournament, and was scheduled to fight Takao Hanawa in the tournament semifinals at Krush-EX 2014 vol.2 on April 6, 2014. Hanawa won the fight by unanimous decision, with all three judges scoring the fight 29–27 in his favor.

After suffering his first professional loss, Hayashi was scheduled to face Goro Man at Krush.45 on August 24, 2014. The fight was ruled a unanimous decision draw.

Hayashi was next scheduled to face Kiyoshi Kawanaka at Krush.64 on March 20, 2016, 17 months after his last fight. Hayashi won the fight by a first-round knockout.

Hayashi was scheduled to face Wei Rui in a Wu Lin Feng and Krush cross-promotional event held on June 4, 2016. Rui won the fight by a third-round knockout.

Hayashi was scheduled to make his K-1 debut against Yuji Takeuchi at K-1 World GP 2016 -60kg World Tournament on September 19, 2016. He won the fight by a first-round technical knockout.

==== Bigbang ====
Hayashi briefly left K-1 to compete with Bigbang. In his first fight with the promotion, Hayashi was scheduled to fight Kyoshiro for the Bigbang Super Lightweight title at Bigbang 27 on December 4, 2016. The fight ended in a draw.

Hayashi was scheduled to face Katsuki Ishida at Krush.73 on February 18, 2017. He lost the fight by a first-round knockout.

Hayashi returned to Bigbang to fight Yuki Masui at Bigbang 29 on June 4, 2017. He won the fight by a third-round knockout.

Hayashi challenged Kyoshiro for the Bigbang Super Lightweight title for the second time at Bigbang 30 on September 3, 2017. He won the fight by unanimous decision, with scores of 30–29, 30-28 and 30–29.

==== Return to Krush ====
Hayashi returned to Krush to take part in the 2017 Krush lightweight tournament. He was scheduled to face Gonnapar Weerasakreck in the tournament semifinals, held at Krush.82 on November 5, 2017. Gonnapar won the fight by a first-round knockout.

Hayashi was scheduled to face Taito at Krush.85 on February 12, 2018. Hayashi won the fight by a first-round knockout, stopping Taito after just 45 seconds.

Hayashi was scheduled to face the #1 ranked RISE lightweight contender Keisuke Niwa, in a non-title bout, at Bigbang 33 on June 3, 2018. Hayashi won the fight by unanimous decision, with scores of 30–29, 30-28 and 30–29.

Hayashi was scheduled to face Hiroshi Mizumachi at Krush.91 on August 5, 2018. Hayashi won the fight by a first-round technical knockout, managing to knock Mizumachi down three times inside of the round.

Hayashi was scheduled to face Rukiya Anpo at K-1 World GP 2018: inaugural Cruiserweight Championship Tournament on September 24, 2018. Anpo won the bout by a third-round knockout. Although Hayashi spent the majority of the fight advancing on Anpo and backing him into the ring corners, Anpo was able to land a left straight from the southpaw stance which knocked Hayashi out.

=== K-1 Lightweight champion ===
==== K-1 Lightweight Grand Prix ====
Hayashi participated in the 2018 K-1 Lightweight World Grand Prix, held on December 8, 2018. He was scheduled to face the 50-fight veteran Nicolas Gaffie in the tournament quarterfinals. Hayashi won the quarterfinal bout by split decision, with two judges scoring the fight 30–28 and 30–29 for Hayashi, while the third judge scored the fight 29–28 for Gaffie.

Hayashi advanced to the semifinals, where he faced the reigning Krush Super Lightweight champion Yuto Shinohara. Hayashi knocked Shinohara down twice in the first round, earning him a technical knockout victory under the tournament rules. The first knockdown was scored with a right hook, while the second knockdown was scored with a right straight.

Hayashi faced Fumiya Osawa in the tournament finals. He entered the final bout badly, as he suffered a first-round knockdown from a left hook. Hayashi took over from the second round onward, knocking Osawa down once in the second round. He managed to knock Osawa down two more times before the two minute mark of the third round, which earned him a technical knockout victory.

==== Title reign ====
Hayashi was scheduled to challenge the incumbent K-1 lightweight champion Koya Urabe at K-1 World GP 2019: K’FESTA 2 on March 10, 2019. It was the first title defense of Urabe's second reign as the K-1 lightweight champion. All three judges scored the fight an even 29–29 draw after the first three-round were fought. Accordingly, an extra round was fought, after which Hayashi was awarded a unanimous decision.

Hayashi was scheduled to face Deniz Demirkapu at K-1 World GP 2019: Japan vs World 5 vs 5 & Special Superfight in Osaka on August 24, 2019. Hayashi suffered a knockdown in the first round, but managed to rally back in the second round, winning the fight by a second-round technical knockout.

Hayashi was scheduled to face Daiki Kaneko, in another non-title bout, at K-1 WORLD GP 2019 JAPAN Yokohamatsuri on November 24, 2019. He won the fight by a second-round knockout.

==== Title loss ====
Hayashi was scheduled to face Shuai Zhu, in another non-title bout, at K-1: K’Festa 3 on March 22, 2019. The fight was later cancelled due to the COVID-19 pandemic. Zhu was replaced by Kim Falk, who likewise later withdrew from the bout. Taio Asahisa stepped in as the second replacement opponent, moving up from super featherweight to lightweight. Despite coming into the fight as a significant favorite, Hayashi suffered an upset loss. Asahisa managed to knock Hayashi down twice in the second round and remained in control for the remainder of the fight, winning the fight by unanimous decision, with scores of 30–26, 30-26 and 29–26.

Hayashi was scheduled to make his first title defense against Gonnapar Weerasakreck at K-1 World GP 2020 in Osaka on September 22, 2020. A month before the fight Hayashi suffered a left rib fracture and a fracture of his right ring finger during practice. The fight was therefore postponed and rescheduled for K-1 World GP 2020 Winter's Crucial Bout on December 13, 2020. Gonnapar won the fight by majority decision, with scores of 30–29, 30-28 and 29-29.

=== Move to super lightweight ===
Hayashi was scheduled to face Vitor Tofanelli at K-1 World GP 2021: Japan Bantamweight Tournament. After being knocked down in the first round, and the beginning of the second round, Hayashi rallied back to score three knockdowns over Tofanelli to win the fight by a second-round technical knockout.

Hayashi was scheduled to face the reigning Krush Super Lightweight titleholder Daizo Sasaki at the K-1 World GP 2021: Yokohamatsuri on September 20, 2021. Hayashi lost the fight by unanimous decision, with scores of 27–26, 28-27 and 28–26. The pace of the fight increased in the second, after a slow first, with Hayashi managing to knock Sasaki down once, although Sasaki in turn knocked him down twice. Hayashi was unable to mount a comeback in the third round and suffered his first defeat in a new weight class.

Hayashi was scheduled to face the former RISE lightweight champion Fukashi Mizutani at K-1 World GP 2021 in Osaka on December 4, 2021. Hayashi won the fight by unanimous decision, with scores of 29–28, 29-28 and 29–28. He knocked Fukashi down in the third round, although he was unable to finish him.

Hayashi was next booked to face Hayato Suzuki at K-1: K'Festa 5 on April 3, 2022. He lost the fight by knockout in the third round. Hayashi was first knocked down with a left straight late in the second round, before being finished with a flurry of strikes early in the last round of the bout.

Hayashi faced Ruku Kojima at K-1 World GP 2022 Yokohamatsuri on September 11, 2022. He won the fight by a first-round knockout, flooring Kojima with a left hook.

Hayashi fought a rematch with Fukashi Mizutani at K-1 World GP 2022 in Osaka on December 3, 2022. He won the fight by unanimous decision, with scores of 30–28, 30–28 and 30–27.

Hayashi challenged the K-1 World GP Super Lightweight champion Tetsuya Yamato at K-1 World GP 2023: K'Festa 6 on March 12, 2023. He lost the fight by unanimous decision, with scores of 29–27, 29–28 and 30–27, after being knocked down in the opening round.

Hayashi faced Shu Inagaki at Krush.160 on April 28, 2024. He lost the fight by unanimous decision.

Hayashi faced Kensei Kondo at K-1 World GP 2024 in Osaka on October 5, 2024. Despite twice knocking his opponent down, Hayashi lost the fight by a second-round technical knockout.

== Titles and accomplishments ==
- Bigbang
  - 2017 Bigbang Super Lightweight Championship
- K-1
  - 2018 K-1 World GP -62.5kg World Grand Prix Tournament winner
  - 2019 K-1 Lightweight Championship

== Kickboxing record ==
Kickboxing record
22 wins (15 (T)KOs), 14 losses, 2 draws, 0 no contests
Date	Result	Opponent	Event	Location	Method	Round	Time
2026-09-12	Loss	(Japan) Yuta Murakoshi	K-1 World MAX 2026 - World Tournament Opening Round	Tokyo, Japan	Decision (unanimous)	3	3:00
2026-05-02	Loss	(Japan) Kuto Ueno	Krush.189	Tokyo, Japan	TKO (corner stoppage)	2	2:55
2024-10-05	Loss	(Japan) Kensei Kondo	K-1 World GP 2024 in Osaka	Osaka, Japan	TKO (3 knockdowns)	2	1:36
2024-04-28	Loss	(Japan) Shu Inagaki	Krush.160	Tokyo, Japan	Decision (unanimous)	3	3:00
2023-03-12	Loss	(Japan) Tetsuya Yamato	K-1 World GP 2023: K'Festa 6	Tokyo, Japan	Decision (unanimous)	3	3:00
For the K-1 Super Lightweight (-65kg) title.
2022-12-03	Win	(Japan) Fukashi Mizutani	K-1 World GP 2022 in Osaka	Osaka, Japan	Decision (unanimous)	3	3:00
2022-09-11	Win	(Japan) Ruku Kojima	K-1 World GP 2022 Yokohamatsuri	Yokohama, Japan	KO (left hook)	1	1:42
2022-04-03	Loss	(Japan) Hayato Suzuki	K-1: K'Festa 5	Tokyo, Japan	KO (punches + knee)	3	0:19
2021-12-04	Win	(Japan) Fukashi Mizutani	K-1 World GP 2021 in Osaka	Osaka, Japan	Decision (unanimous)	3	3:00
2021-09-20	Loss	(Japan) Daizo Sasaki	K-1 World GP 2021: Yokohamatsuri	Yokohama, Japan	Decision (unanimous)	3	3:00
2021-05-23	Win	(Brazil) Vitor Tofanelli	K-1 World GP 2021: Japan Bantamweight Tournament	Tokyo, Japan	TKO (3 knockdowns)	2	2:35
2020-12-13	Loss	(Thailand) Kongnapa Weerasakreck	K-1 World GP 2020 Winter's Crucial Bout	Tokyo, Japan	Decision (majority)	3	3:00
Lost the K-1 Lightweight Championship.
2020-03-22	Loss	(Japan) Taio Asahisa	K-1: K’Festa 3	Saitama, Japan	Decision (unanimous)	3	3:00
2019-11-24	Win	(Japan) Daiki Kaneko	K-1 WORLD GP 2019 JAPAN Yokohamatsuri	Yokohama, Japan	KO (punches)	2	0:35
2019-08-24	Win	(Belgium) Deniz Demirkapu	K-1 World GP 2019: Japan vs World & Special Superfight in Osaka	Osaka, Japan	TKO (punches)	2	3:00
2019-03-10	Win	(Japan) Koya Urabe	K-1 World GP 2019: K’FESTA 2	Saitama, Japan	Ext.R decision (unanimous)	4	3:00
Wins the K-1 Lightweight Championship.
2018-12-08	Win	(Japan) Fumiya Osawa	K-1 World GP 2018: K-1 Lightweight World Tournament, Final	Osaka, Japan	KO (referee stoppage)	3	1:52
Wins the K-1 World GP 2018 -62.5kg World Tournament.
2018-12-08	Win	(Japan) Yuto Shinohara	K-1 World GP 2018: K-1 Lightweight World Tournament, Semifinals	Osaka, Japan	KO (right cross)	1	2:31
2018-12-08	Win	(Spain) Nicolas Gaffie	K-1 World GP 2018: K-1 Lightweight World Tournament, Quarterfinals	Osaka, Japan	Decision (split)	3	3:00
2018-09-24	Loss	(Japan) Rukiya Anpo	K-1 World GP 2018: inaugural Cruiserweight Championship Tournament	Saitama, Japan	KO (straight left)	3	0:44
2018-08-05	Win	(Japan) Hiroshi Mizumachi	Krush.91	Tokyo, Japan	KO (3 knockdowns)	1	2:47
2018-06-03	Win	(Japan) Keisuke Niwa	Bigbang 33	Tokyo, Japan	Decision (unanimous)	3	3:00
2018-02-12	Win	(Japan) Taito	Krush.85	Tokyo, Japan	KO (right hook)	1	0:45
2017-11-05	Loss	(Thailand) Kongnapa Weerasakreck	Krush.82 –63 kg Tournament Semi Finals	Tokyo, Japan	KO (right hook)	1	2:07
2017-09-03	Win	(Japan) Kyoshiro	Bigbang 30	Tokyo, Japan	Decision (unanimous)	3	3:00
Wins the Bigbang Super Lightweight title
2017-06-04	Win	(Japan) Yuki Masui	Bigbang 29	Tokyo, Japan	KO (punches)	3	1:52
2017-02-18	Loss	(Japan) Katsuki Ishida	Krush.73	Japan	KO (punches)	1	1:35
2016-12-04	Draw	(Japan) Kyoshiro	Bigbang 27	Tokyo, Japan	Decision	3	3:00
For the Bigbang Super Lightweight title
2016-09-19	Win	(Japan) Yuji Takeuchi	K-1 World GP 2016 -60kg World Tournament	Tokyo, Japan	KO (3 knockdowns)	1	2:47
2016-06-04	Loss	(China) Wei Rui	Wu Lin Feng vs Krush	Zhengzhou, China	KO (straight left)	3	
2016-03-20	Win	(Japan) Kiyoshi Kawanaka	Krush.64	Japan	KO (left straight)	1	1:49
2014-08-24	Draw	(Japan) Goro Man	Krush.45	Nagoya, Japan	Decision (unanimous)	3	3:00
2014-04-06	Loss	(Japan) Takao Hanawa	Krush-EX 2014 vol.2 Krush -58 kg Tournament Semi Finals	Tokyo, Japan	Decision (unanimous)	3	3:00
2014-02-14	Win	(Japan) Sei Ono	Krush.38	Tokyo, Japan	Decision (unanimous)	3	3:00
2013-12-14	Win	(Japan) Takashi Ohata	Krush.35	Japan	KO (right cross)	1	1:28
2013-10-13	Win	(Japan) Kyohei Hayashi	Krush-IGNITION 2013 vol.7	Tokyo, Japan	KO (left hook to the body)	1	1:38
2013-08-25	Win	(Japan) Shoki Nishikawa	Krush.31	Hiroshima, Japan	KO (right cross)	1	1:02
2013-02-11	Win	(Japan) Masashi Sakimura	HIGH SPEED 4	Osaka, Japan	Decision (unanimous)	3	3:00
Legend: Win Loss Draw/no contest Notes

Amateur kickboxing record
Date	Result	Opponent	Event	Location	Method	Round	Time
2012-07-22	Win	(Japan) Ryota Yamamuro	DEMOLITION 11	Osaka, Japan	Decision (unanimous)	3	3:00
2012-04-30	Win	(Japan) Yuki Sato	DEMOLITION HIGH SPEED III	Osaka, Japan	KO (right cross)	1	2:20
2011-07-18	Win	(Japan) Tatsuya Takama	DEMOLITION 2 DAYS ～day 2nd Kick Boxing～ – HIGH SPEED –	Osaka, Japan	TKO (3 knockdowns)	1	1:18
Legend: Win Loss Draw/no contest Notes

== See also ==
- List of male kickboxers
- List of K-1 champions
