= Yuma Saikyo =

Japanese kickboxer

- Born: 西京 佑馬; September 21, 2000 (age 26); Ebina, Japan
- Height: 174 cm (5 ft 9 in)
- Weight: 62.5 kg (138 lb; 9.84 st)
- Division: Flyweight
- Style: Kickboxing
- Stance: Orthodox
- Fighting out of: Tokyo, Japan
- Team: K-1 GYM SAGAMI-ONO KREST
- Years active: 2017 – present

Kickboxing record
- Total: 21
- Wins: 14
- By knockout: 5
- Losses: 7
- By knockout: 1

Other information
- Notable relatives: Haruma Saikyo (brother)

Yuma Saikyo (西京 佑馬) is a Japanese kickboxer, fighting out of Tokyo, Japan. He is the former Krush Super Featherweight champion.

As of 1 August 2020, he is ranked the #7 flyweight in the world by Combat Press.

== Kickboxing career ==
Saikyo made his professional debut in April 2017, against Hiroki Kokubo. He won the fight by a first-round knockout. He won his next fight against Takuma Kawaguchi by unanimous decision. Yuma was next scheduled to fight Yuya during Krush 85. He won the bout by unanimous decision.

Saikyo was then scheduled to fight the future Krush Super Featherweight champion Leona Pettas during Krush 87. Pettas won the fight by unanimous decision.

Following this loss, Saikyo was scheduled to fight Takumi Yokoyama, whom he defeated by an extra round split decision. He was more convincing in his next fight, defeating Ali Zarinfar after just 38 second by a left hook KO.

Saikyo was then given a chance to fight Kotaro Shimano for the Krush Super Featherweight title. He beat Shimano by unanimous decision and became the Krush champion at just 18 years of age.

For his first title defense, Saikyo was scheduled to fight a rematch with Leona Pettas. Pettas once again won the fight by decision.

Saikyo's next fight came a year later, during Krush 117, when he was scheduled to fight Tomoya Yokoyama. Saikyo lost the fight by unanimous decision, going on a losing skid for the first time in his career.

Saikyo was scheduled to fight Yuto Shinohara at K'Festa 4. The event was later rescheduled for March 31, 2021. He won the fight by split decision.

Saikyo was scheduled to face Tatsuki at K-1 World GP 2021 in Fukuoka on July 17, 2021. He won the fight by unanimous decision.

Saikyo was scheduled to face the former K-1 lightweight champion Kongnapa Weerasakreck at K-1 World GP 2021 in Osaka on December 4, 2021. He lost the fight by majority decision.

== Titles and accomplishments ==
=== Professional ===
- Krush
  - 2019 Krush Super Featherweight (−60kg) Champion
  - 2025 Krush Lightweight Grand Prix Winner

Awards

- efight
  - efight "Fighter of the Month" (February 2025)

=== Amateur ===
- 2016 K-1 Koshien ‐60 kg Champion
- 2015 K-1 All Japan Junior B-class -60 kg Tournament Winner
- 2013 Shin Karate Tokyo K-3 Tournament Middle School Winner

== Fight record ==
Professional Kickboxing record
14 Wins (5 (T)KO's), 7 Losses, 0 Draw, 0 No Contest
| Date | Result | Opponent | Event | Location | Method | Round | Time |
| 2026-02-08 | Loss | (Japan) Kiyomitsu Samuel Nagasawa | K-1 World GP 2026 - 90kg World Tournament | Tokyo, Japan | KO (Body punches) | 1 | 1:46 |
| 2025-09-07 | Loss | (Japan) Yuzuki Satomi | K-1 World MAX 2025 - World Tournament Opening Round | Tokyo, Japan | Ext.R Decision (Split) | 4 | 3:00 |
| 2025-02-24 | Win | (Japan) Haru Furumiya | Krush 171 - Lightweight Grand Prix, Final | Tokyo, Japan | TKO (Left hook) | 1 | 2:29 |
Wins the 2025 Krush Lightweight Grand Prix.
| 2025-02-24 | Win | (Japan) Shoya | Krush 171 - Lightweight Grand Prix, Semifinals | Tokyo, Japan | Decision (Unanimous) | 3 | 3:00 |
| 2025-02-24 | Win | (Japan) Hiroki | Krush 171 - Lightweight Grand Prix, Quarterfinals | Tokyo, Japan | Decision (Unanimous) | 3 | 3:00 |
| 2024-12-08 | Win | (Japan) Haru Furumiya | Krush 169 | Tokyo, Japan | Decision (Unanimous) | 3 | 3:00 |
| 2023-08-18 | Win | (Japan) Go Kato | Krush 164 | Tokyo, Japan | KO (Left hook) | 2 | 1:07 |
| 2022-08-11 | Loss | (Japan) Yuzuki Satomi | K-1 World GP 2022 in Fukuoka | Fukuoka, Japan | Decision (Unanimous) | 3 | 3:00 |
| 2022-04-30 | Win | (Japan) Yuki Masui | Krush 136 | Tokyo, Japan | KO (Left hook) | 2 | 0:58 |
| 2021-12-04 | Loss | (Thailand) Kongnapa Weerasakreck | K-1 World GP 2021 in Osaka | Osaka, Japan | Decision (Majority) | 3 | 3:00 |
| 2021-07-17 | Win | (Japan) Tatsuki | K-1 World GP 2021 in Fukuoka | Fukuoka, Japan | Decision (Unainmous) | 3 | 3:00 |
| 2021-03-28 | Win | (Japan) Yuto Shinohara | K-1 World GP 2021: K’Festa 4 Day.2 | Tokyo, Japan | Decision (Split) | 3 | 3:00 |
| 2020-09-26 | Loss | (Japan) Tomoya Yokoyama | Krush.117 | Tokyo, Japan | Decision (Unanimous) | 3 | 3:00 |
| 2019-09-16 | Loss | (Japan) Leona Pettas | Krush 105 | Tokyo, Japan | Decision (Majority) | 3 | 3:00 |
Loses the Krush Super Featherweight title.
| 2019-03-09 | Win | (Japan) Kotaro Shimano | Krush.99 | Tokyo, Japan | Decision (Unanimous) | 3 | 3:00 |
Wins the Krush Super Featherweight title.
| 2018-12-16 | Win | (Iran) Ali Zarinfar | Krush.96 | Tokyo, Japan | KO (Left Hook) | 1 | 0:38 |
| 2018-06-30 | Win | (Japan) Takumi Yokoyama | Krush.89 | Tokyo, Japan | Ext.R Decision (Split) | 4 | 3:00 |
| 2018-04-22 | Loss | (Japan) Leona Pettas | Krush.87 | Tokyo, Japan | Decision (Unanimous) | 3 | 3:00 |
| 2018-02-12 | Win | (Japan) Yuya | Krush.85 | Tokyo, Japan | Decision (Unanimous) | 3 | 3:00 |
| 2017-06-18 | Win | (Japan) Takuma Kawaguchi | K-1 World GP 2017 Super Welterweight Championship Tournament | Tokyo, Japan | Decision (Unanimous) | 3 | 3:00 |
| 2017-04-22 | Win | (Japan) Hiroki Kokubo | K-1 World GP 2017 Super Bantamweight Championship Tournament | Tokyo, Japan | KO (Left Hook) | 1 | 2:45 |
Legend: Win Loss Draw/No contest Notes

Amateur Kickboxing Record
| Date | Result | Opponent | Event | Location | Method | Round | Time |
|---|---|---|---|---|---|---|---|
| 2016-11-03 | Win | (Japan) Takumi Yokoyama | K-1 World GP 2016, K-1 Koshien 2016 Tournament, Final | Tokyo, Japan | Decision | 3 | 2:00 |
Wins the 2016 Koshien −60kg title.
| 2016-07-30 | Win | (Japan) Tatsuya Tsuji | K-1 Koshien 2016 Tournament, Semi Final | Tokyo, Japan | Decision | 1 | 2:00 |
| 2016-07-30 | Win | (Japan) Tasuku Nakajima | K-1 Koshien 2016 Tournament, Quarter Final | Tokyo, Japan | KO | | |
| 2016-07-30 | Win | (Japan) Ryu Takeyoshi | K-1 Koshien 2016 Tournament, First Round | Tokyo, Japan | Decision | 1 | 2:00 |
| 2015-10-18 | Win | (Japan) Yousei Kuniyoshi | K-1 Challenge 2015 B-Class One Match | Tokyo, Japan | Decision (Unanimous) | 2 | 2:00 |
| 2015-08-15 | Loss | (Japan) Kaisei Kondo | K-1 Challenge 2015, B-Class Tournament Final | Tokyo, Japan | Ext.R Decision | 2 | 2:00 |
For the K-1 All Japan Amateur Junior B-class −60kg title.
| 2015-08-15 | Win | (Japan) Ibuki Hoshina | K-1 Challenge 2015, B-Class Tournament Semi Final | Tokyo, Japan | KO | | |
| 2015-04-26 | Win | (Japan) Kaisei Kondo | K-1 Amateur Challenge 2015, All Japan B-class Tournament Final | Tokyo, Japan | Decision | 1 | 2:00 |
| 2015-02-15 | Win | (Japan) Takuma Kawaguchi | K-1 Challenge 2015, B-Class Tournament Final | Tokyo, Japan | Decision | 2 | 2:00 |
Wins K-1 All Japan Amateur Junior B-class −60kg title.
| 2015-02-15 | Win | (Japan) Shizuma Ogasawara | K-1 Challenge 2015, B-Class Tournament Semi Final | Tokyo, Japan | Decision | 1 | 2:00 |
| 2015-02-15 | Win | (Japan) Kiyoshi Miyake | K-1 Challenge 2015, B-Class Tournament Quarter Final | Tokyo, Japan | Decision | 1 | 2:00 |
| 2014-10-19 | Win | (Japan) Hikaru Kitayama | K-1 Challenge 2014, B-Class Tournament, Final | Tokyo, Japan | Decision (Majority) | 2 | 2:00 |
| 2014-10-19 | Win | (Japan) Naito Kobayashi | K-1 Challenge 2014, B-Class Tournament, Semi Final | Tokyo, Japan | Decision (Unanimous) | 2 | 2:00 |
| 2014-02-11 | Loss | (Japan) Yuudai Kannaka | Amateur REBELS BLOW-CUP 24, Final | Tokyo, Japan | Ex.R Decision (Split) | 2 | 3:00 |
| 2014-02-11 | Win | (Japan) Takeshi Ikeda | Amateur REBELS BLOW-CUP 24, Semi Final | Tokyo, Japan | Decision (Unanimous) | 1 | 3:00 |
Legend: Win Loss Draw/No contest Notes

== See also ==
- List of male kickboxers
