= Kongnapa Weerasakreck =

Thai kickboxer

- Born: December 12, 1992 (age 33); Nakhon Phanom, Thailand
- Other names: Kongnapa Mor.Tassanai (ก้องนภา ม.ทัศนัย); Gonnapar Weerasakreck (ゴンナパー・ウィラサクレック)
- Height: 167 cm (5 ft 5 1/2 in)
- Weight: 62.5 kg (138 lb; 9.84 st)
- Division: Bantamweight
- Style: Muay Thai
- Stance: Southpaw
- Fighting out of: Tokyo, Japan
- Team: Weerasakreck Fairtex Gym

Kickboxing record
- Total: 157
- Wins: 121
- By knockout: 28
- Losses: 32
- Draws: 4

Kongnapa Weerasakreck (born December 12, 1992) is a Thai Muay Thai fighter and kickboxer. He is the former K-1 Lightweight champion and former Krush Lightweight champion.

After having over a hundred fights in Thailand, Gonnapar moved to Japan in 2010.

As of May 2020, he is the #2 ranked super bantamweight in the world, according to Combat Press.

== Kickboxing career ==
Kongnapa made his kickboxing debut against Hideaki Yamazaki in September 2016, a fight which he won by unanimous decision. Before that, he fought in muay thai, winning the WPMF World Super Lightweight title and successfully defending it twice.

Kongnapa participated in the 2017 K-1 Lightweight Grand Prix. In the quarterfinals, he won a unanimous decision against Koya Urabe, but lost the semifinal bout against Ren Hiramoto by a first round knockout.

In June 2017, Gonnapar fought Wei Rui for the K-1 Lightweight title. Rui won the fight by majority decision.

Kongnapa rebounded from this loss with a three fight winning streak, defeating Pan Ryunson by unanimous decision, Kenta Hayashi by a first round knockout and Katsuki Ishida by a second round knockout. This streak earned him the chance to fight Daizo Sasaki for the Krush Lightweight title at Krush 87. Gonnapar won the fight by unanimous decision. He defended the title thrice, winning a unanimous decision against Fumiya Osawa at Krush 93, Takumi Yokoyama by majority decision at Krush 110, and Yuto Shinohara by unanimous decision at Krush 113. On March 1, 2021, Gonnapar vacated his Krush title in order to focus on his K-1 title.

=== K-1 Lightweight Champion ===
At K-1 World GP 2020 Winter's Crucial Bout, Gonnapar fought Kenta Hayashi for the K-1 Lightweight title. He won the fight by majority decision.

Kongnapa faced Daiki Nagumo at K-1 World GP 2021: K’Festa 4 Day.2 on March 28, 2021 in a non-title bout. He won the fight via second-round knockout.

In his first title defense, Gonnapar is expected to face Taio Asahisa at K-1 World Grand Prix 2021. He lost the fight by an extra round split decision.

=== Post-title reign ===
Kongnapa was scheduled to face Yuma Saikyo at K-1 World GP 2021 in Osaka on December 4, 2021. He won the fight by majority decision.

Kongnapa was booked to face Shoya Suzuki at K-1: K'Festa 5 on April 3, 2022. He won the fight by first round knockout.

== Titles and accomplishments ==
- World Professional Muaythai Federation
  - 2015 WPMF World Super Lightweight Champion
    - Two successful title defenses
- Krush
  - 2018 Krush Lightweight Champion
    - Three successful title defenses
- K-1
  - 2020 K-1 World GP Lightweight (-62.5kg) Champion
- Knock Out
  - 2025 KNOCK OUT Red Lightweight (-62.5kg) Champion

Awards

- 2020 Combat Press "Breakout Fighter of the Year"

== Fight record ==
Professional Kickboxing & Muay Thai Record
121 Wins (29 (T)KO's), 33 Losses, 4 Draws, 0 No Contest
Date	Result	Opponent	Event	Location	Method	Round	Time
2026-12-30		(Japan) Yota Shigemori	KNOCK OUT.71 ～K.O CLIMAX 2026～	Tokyo, Japan			
For the vacant KNOCK OUT Lightweight (62.5kg) title.
2026-11-15	Win	(Japan) Rintaro Yoshida	KNOCK OUT.70	Tokyo, Japan	TKO (corner stoppage)	3	0:58
2026-09-05	Win	(Australia) Chadd Collins	KNOCK OUT.68 ～KNOCKIN' on the WORLD～	Yokohama, Japan	Decision (Unanimous)	3	3:00
2026-05-15	Win	(Myanmar) Super Yay Chan	KNOCK OUT.64	Tokyo, Japan	Decision (Unanimous)	3	3:00
2026-02-15	Draw	(Japan) Taimu Hisai	KNOCK OUT.61	Tokyo, Japan	Decision (Majority)	3	3:00
For the KNOCK OUT Lightweight (62.5kg) title.
2025-12-30	Loss	(Japan) Taimu Hisai	KNOCK OUT.60 - K.O CLIMAX 2025	Tokyo, Japan	Ext.R Decision (Split)	4	3:00
Loses the KNOCK OUT Lightweight (62.5kg) title.
2025-08-29	Win	(Japan) Kanato Shimoji	KNOCK OUT 56	Tokyo, Japan	KO (Left cross)	3	0:32
2025-06-22	Win	(Japan) Yota Shigemori	THE KNOCK OUT	Tokyo, Japan	KO (Right hook)	3	0:26
Wins the KNOCK OUT Red Lightweight (-62.5kg) title.
2025-02-09	Win	(Japan) Kyohei Furumura	KNOCK OUT 2025 vol.1	Tokyo, Japan	Decision (Unanimous)	3	3:00
2024-10-26	Loss	(China) Wei Weiyang	Wu Lin Feng 549 - 63 kg Qualifier Tournament, Semifinals	Tangshan, China	Decision (Unanimous)	3	3:00
2024-09-28	Win	(Japan) Kuto Ueno	Krush.165	Tokyo, Japan	TKO (Corner stoppage)	3	0:19
2024-07-07	Loss	(Japan) Yuki Yoza	K-1 World MAX 2024 - World Championship Tournament Final	Tokyo, Japan	TKO (3 Knockdowns)	1	2:30
2024-04-28	Win	(Japan) Takuma Tsukamoto	Krush.160	Tokyo, Japan	Decision (Unanimous)	3	3:00
2022-08-11	Win	(Japan) Hiroto Iwasaki	K-1 World GP 2022 in Fukuoka	Fukuoka, Japan	TKO (Doctor stoppage)	1	3:00
2022-06-19	Win	(Japan) Taiju Shiratori	THE MATCH 2022	Tokyo, Japan	TKO (Right hook)	1	2:42
2022-04-03	Win	(Japan) Shoya Suzuki	K-1: K'Festa 5	Tokyo, Japan	KO (Jumping knee)	1	2:13
2021-12-04	Win	(Japan) Yuma Saikyo	K-1 World GP 2021 in Osaka	Osaka, Japan	Decision (Majority)	3	3:00
2021-07-17	Loss	(Japan) Taio Asahisa	K-1 World GP 2021 in Fukuoka	Fukuoka, Japan	Ext.R Decision (Split)	4	3:00
Loses the K-1 Lightweight title.
2021-03-28	Win	(Japan) Daiki Nagumo	K-1 World GP 2021: K’Festa 4 Day.2	Tokyo, Japan	KO (Punches)	2	1:31
2020-12-13	Win	(Japan) Kenta Hayashi	K-1 World GP 2020 Winter's Crucial Bout	Tokyo, Japan	Decision (Majority)	3	3:00
Wins the K-1 Lightweight Championship.
2020-06-28	Win	(Japan) Yuto Shinohara	Krush.113	Tokyo, Japan	Decision (Unanimous)	3	3:00
Defends the Krush Lightweight title.
2020-01-25	Win	(Japan) Takumi Yokoyama	Krush 110	Tokyo, Japan	Decision (Majority)	3	3:00
Defends the Krush Lightweight title.
2019-03-10	Win	(China) Liu Wei	K-1 World GP 2019: K’FESTA 2	Saitama, Japan	Decision (Unanimous)	3	3:00
2018-12-08	Loss	(Japan) Yuto Shinohara	K-1 World GP 2018: K-1 Lightweight World's Strongest Tournament, Quarter Finals	Osaka, Japan	KO (2 Knockdowns/Left Hook)	1	0:25
2018-09-30	Win	(Japan) Fumiya Osawa	Krush.93	Tokyo, Japan	Decision (Unanimous)	3	3:00
Defends the Krush Lightweight title.
2018-06-17	Win	(Japan) Rukiya Anpo	K-1 World GP 2018: 2nd Featherweight Championship Tournament	Saitama, Japan	KO (Left Straight)	2	1:48
2018-04-22	Win	(Japan) Daizo Sasaki	Krush.87	Tokyo, Japan	Decision (Unanimous)	3	3:00
Wins the Krush Lightweight title.
2018-02-12	Win	(Japan) Katsuki Ishida	Krush.85	Tokyo, Japan	KO (Jumping Knee)	2	2:22
2017-11-05	Win	(Japan) Kenta Hayashi	Krush.82 –63 kg Tournament Semi Finals	Tokyo, Japan	KO (Right Hook)	1	2:07
2017-09-18	Win	(Japan) Pan Ryunson	M-ONE 2017 2nd	Tokyo, Japan	Decision (Unanimous)	3	3:00
Defends the WPMF World Super Lightweight title.
2017-06-18	Loss	(China) Wei Rui	K-1 World GP 2017 Super Middleweight Championship Tournament	Tokyo, Japan	Decision (Majority)	3	3:00
For the K-1 -62.5kg title.
2017-02-25	Loss	(Japan) Ren Hiramoto	K-1 World GP 2017 Lightweight Championship Tournament, Semi Finals	Tokyo, Japan	KO (Left Cross)	1	1:14
2017-02-25	Win	(Japan) Koya Urabe	K-1 World GP 2017 Lightweight Championship Tournament, Quarter Finals	Tokyo, Japan	Decision (Unanimous)	3	3:00
2016-11-23	Win	(Japan) Tatsuya Ishii	M-ONE 2016 FINAL	Tokyo, Japan	TKO (Doctor Stoppage)	4	1:39
Defends the WPMF World Super Lightweight title.
2016-09-25	Win	(Thailand) Kiatphet Giakkonphet	M-ONE 2016 3rd	Tokyo, Japan	TKO (Left Middle Kick)	2	1:37
2016-09-19	Win	(Japan) Hideaki Yamazaki	K-1 World GP 2016 -60kg World Tournament	Tokyo, Japan	Decision (Unanimous)	3	3:00
2016-06-19	Win	(Japan) UMA	M-ONE 2016 vol.2	Tokyo, Japan	Decision (Unanimous)	5	3:00
2016-03-21	Loss	(Japan) Kenta	M-ONE	Tokyo, Japan	Decision (Majority)	5	3:00
2016-02-07	Win	(Japan) Tomoya Yamato	NKB Bushi Series VOL.1	Tokyo, Japan	Decision (Unanimous)	5	3:00
2015-11-29	Win	(Japan) Yasuyuki	HOOST CUP KINGS WEST 2	Osaka, Japan	Decision (Unanimous)	5	3:00
2015-09-27	Win	(Japan) Hachimaki	SUK WEERASAKRECK X	Tokyo, Japan	Decision (Unanimous)	5	3:00
2015-06-14	Win	(Japan) Tsuyoshi Kato	SUK WEERASAKRECK IX	Tokyo, Japan	TKO (Low kicks)	3	1:12
Wins the WPMF World Super Lightweight title.
2015-04-19	Win	(Japan) Shinji Suzuki	WPMF JAPAN × REBELS.35	Tokyo, Japan	TKO (Doctor Stoppage)	2	2:46
2015-01-25	Win	(Japan) Takuya "T-98" Imamura	REBELS.33	Tokyo, Japan	TKO (Doctor Stoppage)	3	0:55
2014-09-21	Win	(Japan) Hideo	M-FIGHT Suk WEERASAKRECK VII	Tokyo, Japan	TKO (Left middle kick)	4	2:04
2014-03-30	Win	(Japan) Yosuke Mizuochi	M-FIGHT SUK WEERASAKRECK V	Tokyo, Japan	TKO (High kicks)	2	
2013-11-17	Loss	(Canada) Hakeem Dawodu	M-FIGHT SUK WEERASAKRECK IV	Tokyo, Japan	TKO (Punches)	3	2:36
2013-09-15	Win	(Japan) Hidekazu Tanaka	M-FIGHT SUK WEERASAKRECK III Part.2	Tokyo, Japan	Decision	3	3:00
2013-03-25	Win	(Japan) Shingen Endo	M-FIGHT Suk WEERASAKRECK I	Tokyo, Japan	KO (Left body kick)	3	0:35
2013-01-06	Win	(Japan) Chemical☆Shunta	RISE INFINITY.II	Tokyo, Japan	Decision (Unanimous)	3	3:00
2012-02-26	Win	(Thailand) Tuanpae Sitsampayak		Thailand	Decision	5	3:00
2011-02-20	Loss	(Thailand) Lak Acegym	Muay Lok 2011～1st～	Tokyo, Japan	Decision (Majority)	3	3:00
2010-11-06	Win	(Japan) Yuki Noro	NKB THE SUPER KICKBOXING STEP UP!	Tokyo, Japan	KO (Right elbow)	3	1:23
2010-07-31	Win	(Thailand) Phetsutin Sor.Boonliang	Lumpinee Stadium	Bangkok, Thailand	KO	3	
2009-04-23	Win	(Thailand) Rawut Tor.Saenchai	Rajadamnern Stadium	Bangkok, Thailand	Decision	5	3:00
Legend: Win Loss Draw/No contest Notes

== See also ==
- List of male kickboxers
- List of K-1 champions
