= Fumiya Osawa =

Japanese kickboxer (born 1991)

- Born: 大沢 文也; 11 September 1991 (age 35); Adachi, Tokyo, Japan
- Height: 1.73 m (5 ft 8 in)
- Weight: 62.5 kg (138 lb; 9 st 12 lb)
- Division: Lightweight
- Style: Kickboxing
- Fighting out of: Tokyo, Japan
- Team: Tang Tang Fight Club
- Years active: 2009 - present

Kickboxing record
- Total: 60
- Wins: 33
- By knockout: 3
- Losses: 23
- By knockout: 5
- Draws: 3
- No contests: 1

Fumiya Osawa (born 11 September 1991) is a Japanese kickboxer, currently fighting in the lightweight division of K-1 and Krush, where he is the former Krush Lightweight champion. Osawa is the 2018 K-1 Lightweight Grand Prix finalist.

== Kickboxing career ==
=== Super Featherweight career ===
==== 2012 Krush Contender Tournament ====
On April 22, 2012, Osawa fought in the quarterfinals of the Krush Super Featherweight tournament, being scheduled to fight Yuya Yamato. He won the fight by unanimous decision, and further beat Makoto Morishige by a first-round TKO in the semifinals. These two wins set up the fight with Katsuya Goto, the other tournament finalist, Krush 19.

After winning an extra round split decision against Katsuya Goto in the tournament finals, Shimano earned the chance to fight Hirotaka Urabe for the Krush Super Featherweight title, at Krush 20. Urabe won the fight by a first-round knockout, dropping Shimano with a spinning back kick.

==== Later Super Featherweight career ====
After his failed title bid, Osawa was scheduled to fight Yuji Takeuchi at Krush 23. He lost the fight by a third-round knockout.

Osawa was then scheduled to fight Koya Urabe at Krush 27. The fight would end in a disqualification win for Osawa, as Urabe landed an illegal punch as the referee was separating the two from a clinch entanglement. The two were immediately scheduled to fight a rematch at Krush 29. Urabe won the rematch by unanimous decision.

Osawa bounced back from these two losses with back-to-back victories over Keisuke Nakamura at Krush 33 by unanimous decision and Kotaro Shimano at Krush 36 by majority decision. This was followed by back-to-back losses by unanimous decision to Tomohiro Kitai at Krush 39 and Toshi at Krush 41.

Following an unbeaten streak of four fights, Osawa was scheduled to make his K-1 debut on July 4, 2015, in a rematch with Kotaro Shimano. As the fight ended in a draw, the two were scheduled to fight a rematch at K-1 World GP 2015: The Championship. Osawa won the fight by unanimous decision. Following a 3–2 run, which ended in a decision loss to Masanobu Goshu, Osawa moved up in weight to lightweight.

=== Lightweight career ===
==== Title fights ====
He was scheduled to make his lightweight debut against Junpei Aotsu at Krush 83. He would win this, as well as his next two fights against Kyoshiro and Bazooka Koki by unanimous decision. This three fight winning streak earned Osawa the chance to fight Gonnapar Weerasakreck for the Krush Lightweight title. Gonnapar won the fight by unanimous decision.

After losing to Gonnapar, Osawa participated in the 2018 K-1 Lightweight Grand Prix. He won a majority decision against Wei Liu in the quarterfinals, and beat Kyoshiro by a second-round TKO in the semifinals. Osawa fought Kenta Hayashi in the finals, and lost the fight by a third-round TKO.

==== Continued lightweight career ====
At K-1: K'Festa 2, Osawa was scheduled to fight Yuto Shinohara. Shinohara won the fight by unanimous decision.

Osawa rebounded with two consecutive victories over Yuzuki Satomi and Zhiwei Wang. He beat Satomi by unanimous decision, and was awarded a DQ win over Wang, after he Wang landed an illegal knee.

He was scheduled to fight a rematch with Yuto Shinohara in December 2019, but had to withdraw after suffering an injury in training.

At Krush 114, Osawa was scheduled to fight Hikaru Hasumi. Hasumi won the fight by TKO, after knocking Osawa down three times in the second round. He was then scheduled to fight Shuji Kawarada at K-1:Winter's Crucial Bout, and lost by split decision.

Osawa snapped the two-fight losing streak with an extra round unanimous decision against Shinichiro Kawasaki at Krush 123.

Osawa was scheduled to fight Koya Urabe at K-1 World GP 2021 in Fukuoka. He lost the bout by unanimous decision, with scores of 30–29, 30-29 and 30–28.

Osawa was scheduled to face Hiroki at K-1 World GP 2021 Japan on December 4, 2021. He won the fight by unanimous decision.

==== Krush lightweight champion ====
Osawa challenged the reigning Krush Lightweight champion Shuji Kawarada at Krush 136 on April 30, 2022, in what was Kawarada's first title defense. He won the fight by unanimous decision, with scores of 30–28, 30–28 and 30–27.

Osawa faced the 2020 True4U bantamweight tournament winner Dansiam Ayothayafightgym at K-1 World GP 2022 in Fukuoka on August 11, 2022. He won the fight by unanimous decision, with scores of 30–27, 30–28 and 29–28.

Osawa made his first Krush Lightweight title defense against Yuzuki Satomi at Krush 145 on January 21, 2023. He retained his title by unanimous decision, with two scorecards of 30–28 and one scorecard of 29–28. The result was changed into a no contest on January 29, 2023, as Osawa scored the sole knockdown of the fight off of an illegal kick catch. An immediate rematch was scheduled to take place at Krush 150 on June 16, 2023. Osawa lost the title by majority decision, with two judges awarding Satomi a 30–29 scorecard, while the third judge scored the contest as an even 29–29 draw.

Osawa faced Hisaki Higashimoto at K-1 World GP 2023 on July 17, 2023. He won the fight by unanimous decision.

Osawa faced Yutaka at K-1 World MAX 2024 - World Tournament Opening Round on March 20, 2024. He won the fight by unanimous decision.

== Championships and accomplishments ==
- RISE
  - 2009 RISE Lightweight Rookies Cup Winner
- Krush
  - 2022 Krush Lightweight Championship
- K-1
  - 2018 K-1 Lightweight Grand Prix Runner-up
- KNOCK OUT
  - 2025 KNOCK OUT Black Lightweight Championship

== Mixed rules record ==
Res.	Record	Opponent	Method	Event	Date	Round	Time	Location	Notes
Win	2-0	Kazuma Sone	Decision (unanimous)	THE KNOCK OUT	June 22, 2025	3	3:00	Tokyo, Japan	Knock Out Unlimited rules
Win	1-0	Bazooka Koki	Decision (unanimous)	K.O CLIMAX 2024	December 30, 2024	3	3:00	Yokohama, Japan	Knock Out Unlimited rules

== Kickboxing and Muay Thai record ==
Professional Kickboxing Record
35 Wins (4 (T)KO's), 23 Losses, 3 Draws, 1 No Contest
Date	Result	Opponent	Event	Location	Method	Round	Time
2026-09-05	Win	(Thailand) Saengdawlek StarlightGym	KNOCK OUT.68 ～KNOCKIN' on the WORLD～	Yokohama, Japan	Decision (Unanimous)	3	3:00
2026-06-21	Loss	(Georgia (country)) Nika Papava	KNOCK OUT.65 - THE KNOCK OUT 2026	Tokyo, Japan	Decision (Unanimous)	3	3:00
2026-02-15	Win	(Japan) Shoji Otani	KNOCK OUT.61	Tokyo, Japan	KO (Right cross)	3	0:44
2025-11-15	Loss	(Thailand) Kaewkangwan Sor.Amnuwaidet	KNOCK OUT.59	Tokyo, Japan	Decision (Majority)	3	3:00
2025-05-18	Win	(Japan) Shoji Otani	KNOCK OUT 2025 vol.3	Tokyo, Japan	Decision (Unanimous)	3	3:00
Wins the KNOCK OUT Black Lightweight Championship.
2024-07-27	Win	(Thailand) Petchsamui Shimura	Krush 163	Tokyo, Japan	Decision (Unanimous)	3	3:00
2024-03-20	Win	(Japan) Yutaka	K-1 World MAX 2024 - World Tournament Opening Round	Tokyo, Japan	Decision (Unanimous)	3	3:00
2023-12-17	Loss	(Japan) Shoji Otani	Krush 156	Tokyo, Japan	Ext.R Decision (Split)	4	3:00
2023-07-17	Win	(Japan) Hisaki Higashimoto	K-1 World GP 2023	Tokyo, Japan	Decision (Unanimous)	3	3:00
2023-06-16	Loss	(Japan) Yuzuki Satomi	Krush 150	Tokyo, Japan	Decision (Majority)	3	3:00
Loses the Krush Lightweight Championship.
2023-01-21	NC	(Japan) Yuzuki Satomi	Krush 145	Tokyo, Japan	No Contest	3	3:00
For the Krush Lightweight Championship. Originally a unanimous decision win for Osawa turned into a no contest after review due to an illegal kick catch leading to a knockdown.
2022-08-11	Win	(Thailand) Dansiam Ayothayafightgym	K-1 World GP 2022 in Fukuoka	Fukuoka, Japan	Decision (Unanimous)	3	3:00
2022-04-30	Win	(Japan) Shuji Kawarada	Krush 136	Tokyo, Japan	Decision (Unainmous)	3	3:00
Wins the Krush Lightweight Championship.
2021-12-04	Win	(Japan) Hiroki	K-1 World GP 2021 Japan	Osaka, Japan	Ext.R Decision (Unanimous)	4	3:00
2021-07-17	Loss	(Japan) Koya Urabe	K-1 World GP 2021 in Fukuoka	Fukuoka, Japan	Decision (Unanimous)	3	3:00
2021-03-27	Win	(Japan) Shinichiro Kawasaki	Krush 123	Bunkyo, Tokyo, Japan	Decision (Unanimous)	4	3:00
2020-12-12	Loss	(Japan) Shuji Kawarada	K-1 World GP 2020 Winter's Crucial Bout	Sumida, Tokyo, Japan	Ext.R Decision (Split)	4	3:00
2020-07-11	Loss	(Japan) Hikaru Hasumi	Krush 114	Shinjuku, Tokyo, Japan	TKO (Three knockdowns)	2	1:45
2019-09-16	Win	(China) Zhiwei Wang	Krush 105	Shinjuku, Tokyo, Japan	DQ (Illegal knee)	1	2:21
2019-06-30	Win	(Japan) Yuzuki Satomi	K-1 World GP 2019: Super Bantamweight World Tournament	Sumida, Tokyo, Japan	Decision (Unanimous)	3	3:00
2019-03-09	Loss	(Japan) Yuto Shinohara	K-1 World GP 2019: K’FESTA 2	Saitama, Japan	Decision (Unanimous)	3	3:00
2018-12-08	Loss	(Japan) Kenta Hayashi	K-1 World GP 2018: K-1 Lightweight World's Strongest Tournament, Final	Namba, Japan	TKO (Four knockdowns)	3	1:52
2018-12-08	Win	(Japan) Kyoshiro	K-1 World GP 2018: K-1 Lightweight World's Strongest Tournament, Semifinals	Namba, Japan	TKO (Punches)	2	2:00
2018-12-08	Win	(China) Wei Liu	K-1 World GP 2018: K-1 Lightweight World's Strongest Tournament Quarterfinals	Namba, Japan	Decision (Majority)	3	3:00
2018-09-30	Loss	(Thailand) Kongnapa Weerasakreck	Krush 93	Tokyo, Japan	Decision (Unanimous)	3	3:00
For the Krush Lightweight Championship.
2018-05-17	Win	(Japan) Bazooka Koki	Krush 88	Tokyo, Japan	Decision (Unanimous)	3	3:00
2018-03-10	Win	(Japan) Kyoshiro	Krush 85	Tokyo, Japan	Decision (Unanimous)	3	3:00
2017-12-09	Win	(Japan) Junpei Aotsu	Krush 83	Tokyo, Japan	Decision (Unanimous)	3	3:00
2017-08-06	Loss	(Japan) Masanobu Goshu	Krush 78	Tokyo, Japan	Decision (Unanimous)	3	3:00
2017-05-28	Win	(Japan) Takumi Yokoyama	Krush 76	Tokyo, Japan	Decision (Unanimous)	3	3:00
2017-03-03	Win	(Japan) Tatsuya Inaishi	Krush 74	Tokyo, Japan	Decision (Unanimous)	3	3:00
2016-10-15	Loss	(Japan) Taio Asahisa	Krush 70	Tokyo, Japan	Decision (Majority)	3	3:00
2016-07-18	Win	(Japan) Yoshiki Harada	Krush 67	Tokyo, Japan	Decision (Unanimous)	3	3:00
2015-11-21	Win	(Japan) Kotaro Shimano	K-1 World GP 2015 The Championship	Tokyo, Japan	Decision (Unanimous)	3	3:00
2015-07-04	Draw	(Japan) Kotaro Shimano	K-1 World GP 2015 -70kg Championship Tournament	Tokyo, Japan	Decision (Unanimous)	3	3:00
2015-05-04	Win	(Japan) Syun Kentoshi	Krush 54	Tokyo, Japan	Decision (Unanimous)	3	3:00
2015-03-14	Win	(Japan) Hitoshi Aketo	Krush 52	Tokyo, Japan	Decision (Majority)	3	3:00
2014-10-05	Win	(Japan) Takeshi Watanabe	Krush 46	Tokyo, Japan	Decision (Unanimous)	3	3:00
2014-08-09	Draw	(Japan) Leona Pettas	Krush 44	Tokyo, Japan	Decision (Majority)	3	3:00
2014-05-11	Loss	(Japan) Toshi	Krush 41	Tokyo, Japan	Decision (Unanimous)	3	3:00
2014-03-08	Loss	(Japan) Tomohiro Kitai	Krush 39	Tokyo, Japan	Decision (Unanimous)	3	3:00
2014-01-04	Win	(Japan) Kotaro Shimano	Krush 36	Tokyo, Japan	Decision (Majority)	3	3:00
2013-09-21	Win	(Japan) Keisuke Nakamura	Krush 33	Tokyo, Japan	Decision (Unanimous)	3	3:00
2013-06-16	Loss	(Japan) Koya Urabe	Krush 29	Tokyo, Japan	Decision (Unanimous)	3	3:00
2013-03-20	Win	(Japan) Koya Urabe	Krush 27	Tokyo, Japan	DQ (Punching after the break)	1	
2012-10-08	Loss	(Japan) Yuji Takeuchi	Krush 23	Tokyo, Japan	KO (Left hook)	3	1:35
2012-07-21	Loss	(Japan) Hirotaka Urabe	Krush 20	Tokyo, Japan	KO (Spinning Back Kick to the Body)	1	2:48
For the Krush Super Featherweight title.
2012-06-08	Win	(Japan) Katsuya Goto	Krush 19, Tournament Finals	Tokyo, Japan	Ext.R Decision (Split)	4	3:00
Wins the Krush Contender Tournament.
2012-04-22	Win	(Japan) Makoto Morishige	Krush-EX 2012 vol.2, Tournament Semifinals	Tokyo, Japan	TKO (Strikes)	1	2:06
2012-04-22	Win	(Japan) Yuya Yamato	Krush-EX 2012 vol.2, Tournament Quarterfinals	Tokyo, Japan	Decision (Unanimous)	3	3:00
2012-02-17	Loss	(Japan) Yuzo Suzuki	Krush 16	Tokyo, Japan	Decision (Unanimous)	3	3:00
2011-12-09	Draw	(Japan) Katsuya Goto	Krush 14	Tokyo, Japan	Decision (Majority)	3	3:00
2011-10-10	Loss	(Japan) Sho Ogawa	Krush YOUTH GP 2011 Opening Round 1	Tokyo, Japan	Decision (Unanimous)	3	3:00
2011-08-21	Loss	(Japan) Kizaemon Saiga	Bigbang: The Road To Unification 6	Tokyo, Japan	Decision (Majority)	3	3:00
2011-05-29	Win	(Japan) Hiroki Namai	Krush -70 kg Championship foundational Tournament Opening	Tokyo, Japan	KO (Right hook)	3	1:21
2011-02-13	Loss	(Japan) Keisuke Nakamura	Krush-EX 2011 vol.1	Tokyo, Japan	Ext.R Decision (Unanimous)	4	3:00
2010-08-22	Loss	(Japan) Shingen Endo	J-NETWORK FORCE for the TRUTH of J 4th	Tokyo, Japan	Decision (Unanimous)	3	3:00
2010-07-19	Loss	(Japan) Takashi Kaga	REBELS-EX	Tokyo, Japan	Technical Decision (Unanimous)	1	3:00
2010-05-03	Win	(Japan) Makoto Morishige	J-NETWORK FORCE for the TRUTH of J 2nd	Tokyo, Japan	Decision (Unanimous)	3	3:00
2009-12-04	Loss	(Japan) Koya Urabe	Krush-EX	Tokyo, Japan	KO	3	1:24
2009-10-04	Win	(Japan) Shinichi Ishii	RISE 59	Tokyo, Japan	Decision (Unanimous)	3	3:00
Wins RISE Rookies Cup -60kg title.
2009-06-28	Win	(Japan) Yukinobu Nakatsuka	RISE 56 ～RISING ROOKIES CUP～	Tokyo, Japan	Decision (Unanimous)	3	3:00
2009-04-05	Loss	(Japan) Kentaro Kimura	J-NETWORK J-FIGHT in SHINJUKU vol.8	Tokyo, Japan	Decision (Majority)	3	3:00
2009-01-18	Win	(Japan) Ken Watanabe	J-NETWORK J-FIGHT in SHINJUKU vol.7	Tokyo, Japan	Decision (Unanimous)	3	3:00
Legend: Win Loss Draw/No contest Notes

== See also ==
- List of male kickboxers
