= Yuto Shinohara =

Japanese kickboxer (born 1998)

- Born: 篠原 悠人; May 15, 1998 (age 28); Osaka, Japan
- Height: 175 cm (5 ft 9 in)
- Weight: 62.5 kg (138 lb; 9.84 st)
- Division: Bantamweight
- Style: Karate, Kickboxing
- Stance: Orthodox
- Fighting out of: Tokyo, Japan
- Team: DURGA
- Years active: 2014 - present

Kickboxing record
- Total: 31
- Wins: 21
- By knockout: 9
- Losses: 10
- By knockout: 6

Yuto Shinohara (Japanese: 篠原悠人, Shinohara Yuto; born May 15, 1998) is a Japanese kickboxer, currently competing in the lightweight division of K-1. A professional competitor since 2014, he is the former Krush Super Lightweight champion and a one-time Krush Lightweight title challenger.

As of January 2023, he is the #9 ranked featherweight kickboxer in the world according to Beyond Kick. Combat Press ranked him as a top ten super bantamweight between March and May 2022, and as a top ten bantamweight between February 2019 and June 2020.

== Kickboxing career ==
=== Super lightweight ===
==== Career beginnings ====
Shinohara made his professional debut against Tasuku Kido at HOOST CUP KINGS WEST on November 16, 2014. He won the fight by a first-round knockout. Shinohara faced Shinichiro Kawasaki a month later, at DEEP KICK 23 on December 21, 2014. He won the fight by unanimous decision. After notching his first two professional wins, Shinohara returned to amateur competition, in order to take part in the K-1 Koshien 2015 Tournament. He won the Koshien title with a third-round knockout of Kensei Kondo at K-1 World GP 2015 The Championship on November 21, 2015.

His spotless professional record and the Koshien tournament win, led to Shihonara being signed by K-1. He made his debut with the organization against Yuki Koge at K-1 World GP 2016 -60kg Japan Tournament on April 24, 2016. He won the fight by a second-round knockout, stopping Koge with a flurry of punches at the 1:15 minute mark.

Shinohara next made his debut with K-1's sister organization Krush, as he was booked to face Daiki Matsushita at Krush.67 on July 18, 2016. Matsushita won the fight by a second-round knockout, handing Shinohara both his first professional loss and his first stoppage loss. Shinohara next faced Tatsuya Mineyama at K-1 World GP 2016 Featherweight Championship Tournament on November 3, 2016. He won the fight by unanimous decision, with all three judges scoring the bout 30–27 in his favor.

After successfully rebounding from his loss to Matsushita, Shinohara took part in the Krush Super Lightweight tournament, held to crown the new champion as Hideaki Yamazaki was stripped of the title due to injuries. He was booked to face Jun Nakazawa in the tournament semifinals, which were held at Krush.73 on February 18, 2017. He lost the fight by a second-round knockout. Shinohara was first knocked down with a left hook midway through the round, and was knocked out with a second left hook soon afterwards.

==== Title run ====
Shinohara faced Kensei Kondo Krush.79 ～in NAGOYA～ on August 20, 2017. The two previously fought in the finals of the 2015 K-1 Koshien tournament, with Shinohara winning by a third-round knockout. He was proved to be the better fighter in their second meeting as well, winning the fight by a second-round knockout.

Shinohara faced FUMIYA at KHAOS.4 on October 14, 2017, representing Kansai in a "Kantō vs Kansai 6 versus 6" themed event. He won the fight by a third-round knockout, stopping FUMIYA with a right cross a minute into the round. Shinohara was furthermore awarded the MVP prize as well, as the best fighter of the event.

Following a split decision victory against Hayato Suzuki at K-1 WORLD GP 2017 JAPAN ～SURVIVAL WARS 2017～ on December 27, 2017, Shinohara returned to Krush to face Takaki Hosogoe at Krush.86 on March 11, 2018. He won the fight by unanimous decision, with all three judges awarding him a 30–27 scorecard.

Shinohara was booked to face FUMIYA at Krush.88 on May 17, 2018. The pair had fought just seven months prior, with Shinohara winning by a third-round knockout. He won the rematch in the same manner, forcing a referee stoppage at the 1:50 minute mark, after having knocked FUMIYA down twice with left hooks.

=== Krush super lightweight champion ===
==== Shinohara vs. Nakazawa ====
At a press conference held by Krush on June 28, 2018, it was announced that Shinohara would challenge the reigning Krush Super Lightweight champion Jun Nakazawa, in what was Nakazawa's second title defense. The bout was scheduled as the co-main event of Krush.91, which was held on August 5, 2018. He won the closely contested fight by split decision. Two of the judges scored the fight 30–29 in his favor, while the third judge scored the fight 30–29 for Nakazawa. Shinohara stated his desire to move down to lightweight (62.5 kg) in his post-fight interview, as he felt at a weight disadvantage at super lightweight.

==== K-1 Lightweight Grand Prix ====
On October 20, 2018, K-1 announced they would hold a Lightweight Grand Prix at K-1 World GP 2018: K-1 Lightweight World's Strongest Tournament on December 8, 2018. Shinohara was booked to face the reigning Krush Lightweight champion Kongnapa Weerasakreck in the tournament quarterfinals. Shinohara knocked Kongnapa with a left hook early in the first round, and although he was able to beat the ten count, Shinohara knocked down him a second time with another left hook soon after. These two knockdowns awarded Shinohara an automatic technical knockout victory under the K-1 tournament rules. He needed just 25 seconds to advance to the next round.

Shinohara advanced to the tournament semifinals, where he faced Kenta Hayashi. Hayashi first knocked Shinohara down with a right hook, before stopping him with a right cross at the 2:31 minute mark of the first-round. Ten days later, on December 18, Shinohara vacated the Krush super lightweight title.

=== Move to lightweight ===
Shinohara faced the 2018 K-1 Lightweight Grand Prix finalist Fumiya Osawa at K-1 World GP 2019: K'FESTA 2 on March 10, 2019. The fight was judged a unanimous decision draw after the first three rounds, with scores of 29–29, 29–29 and 30–30. Accordingly, an extra round was contested, after which Shinohara was awarded the unanimous decision.

Shinohara faced Shinichiro Kawasaki at K-1 World GP 2019: Japan vs World 5 vs 5 & Special Superfight in Osaka on August 24, 2019. The pair previously fought at DEEP KICK 23 on December 21, 2014, with Shinohara winning by unanimous decision. He won the rematch in the same manner, with all three judges scoring the fight 28–26 in his favor. Shinohara was knocked down with a left hook at the 2:02 minute mark of the second round, but was able to knock Kawasaki down twice before the end of the round himself.

Shinohara was rewarded with this two-fight winning streak with the chance to challenge the reigning Krush Lightweight champion Kongnapa Weerasakreck, in the main event of Krush.113 on June 28, 2020. He lost the fight by unanimous decision. Two of the judges scored the fight 30–28 for Kongnapa, while the third judge awarded Kongnapa a 30–29 scorecard.

Shinohara faced the former two-weight K-1 champion Koya Urabe at K-1 World GP 2020 in Osaka on September 22, 2020. Urabe won the fight by unanimous decision, after an extra fourth round was fought.

Shinohara was expected to face the former Krush Super Featherweight champion Yuma Saikyo at K-1: K’Festa 4 on January 24, 2021. The entire event was later postponed as the Japanese prime minister Yoshihide Suga declared a state of emergency for Tokyo, due to the COVID-19 pandemic. Shinohara and Saikyo were rescheduled to face each-other at K-1 World GP 2021: K’Festa 4 Day.2 on March 31, 2021. Shinohara lost the fight by split decision, with scores of 30–29, 29–30 and 29–30.

Shinohara was booked to face Toshiki Taniyama at K-1 World GP 2021: Yokohamatsuri on September 20, 2021. He won the fight by unanimous decision, with scores of 30–27, 30–26 and 30–25. Shinohara knocked Taniyama down twice in the third round, first time with repeated knees and the second time with a right hook.

Shinohara faced the promotional newcomer Katsuki Ishida at K-1 World GP 2021 in Osaka on December 4, 2021. He won the fight by unanimous decision, with scores of 30–29, 30–28 and 30–27.

Shinohara faced the reigning Krush Lightweight champion Shuji Kawarada at K-1 World GP 2022 Japan on February 27, 2022. He won the fight by unanimous decision, with all three judges scoring the fight 30–29 in his favor.

Shinohara faced the multiple-time world and All Japan Kyokushin karate champion Yuki Yoza at K-1 World GP 2022 in Fukuoka on August 11, 2022. He was stopped by low kicks midway through the second round.

Shinohara faced Hiroki at K-1 World GP 2022 in Osaka on December 3, 2022. He won the fight by unanimous decision, with scores of 30–27, 30–27 and 30–26. Shinohara knocked his opponent down with a right straight at the end of the final round.

Shinohara faced the two-time K-1 Koshien super lightweight tournament winner Ryuka at K-1 World GP 2023 on July 17, 2023. He won the fight by clear unanimous decision, with three scorecards of 30–27.

Shinohara faced the two-time Krush Super Featherweight title challenger Tatsuya Oiwa at K-1 ReBIRTH 2 on December 9, 2023. He lost the fight by a first-round knockout.

Shinohara faced Haru Furumiya at K-1 World GP 2024 in Osaka on October 5, 2024. He lost the fight by a second-round technical knockout.

== Titles and accomplishments ==
Professional

- Krush
  - 2018 Krush Super Lightweight -65 kg Champion

Amateur

- DEEP KICK
  - 2010 TOP RUN Junior -50 kg Champion
  - 2011 TOP RUN Junior -55 kg Champion
  - 2013 TOP RUN -60 kg Champion
- New Japanese Kickboxing Federation
  - 2014 NJKF Amateur -65 kg Champion
- K-1
  - 2015 K-1 Koshien -65 kg Champion

== Kickboxing record ==
Professional Kickboxing Record
21 Wins (9 (T)KO's), 10 Losses, 0 Draw, 0 No Contest
Date	Result	Opponent	Event	Location	Method	Round	Time
2026-12-20		(Japan) Yuto Saito	Krush.195 ~in KOBE~	Kobe, Japan			
2026-02-01	Win	(Japan) Arata	Krush 186	Osaka, Japan	KO (Right cross)	1	1:47
2025-11-29	Loss	(Japan) Tatsuya Oiwa	Krush 182	Tokyo, Japan	Decision (Unanimous)	3	3:00
For the Krush Lightweight (-62.5kg) title.
2025-09-27	Win	(Japan) Ruku	Krush 180	Tokyo, Japan	TKO (Punches)	1	1:49
2025-05-18	Win	(Japan) Yuya Miyake	Krush 174	Osaka, Japan	KO (Punches)	2	1:49
2024-10-05	Loss	(Japan) Haru Furumiya	K-1 World GP 2024 in Osaka	Osaka, Japan	TKO (Ref.stop./punches)	2	2:08
2023-12-09	Loss	(Japan) Tatsuya Oiwa	K-1 ReBIRTH 2	Osaka, Japan	KO (Right cross)	1	2:38
2023-07-17	Win	(Japan) Ryuka	K-1 World GP 2023	Tokyo, Japan	Decision (Unanimous)	3	3:00
2022-12-03	Win	(Japan) Hiroki	K-1 World GP 2022 in Osaka	Osaka, Japan	Decision (Unanimous)	3	3:00
2022-08-11	Loss	(Japan) Yuki Yoza	K-1 World GP 2022 in Fukuoka	Fukuoka, Japan	TKO (Low kicks)	2	1:12
2022-02-27	Win	(Japan) Shuji Kawarada	K-1 World GP 2022 Japan	Tokyo, Japan	Decision (Unanimous)	3	3:00
2021-12-04	Win	(Japan) Katsuki Ishida	K-1 World GP 2021 in Osaka	Osaka, Japan	Decision (Unanimous)	3	3:00
2021-09-20	Win	(Japan) Toshiki Taniyama	K-1 World GP 2021: Yokohamatsuri	Yokohama, Japan	Decision (Unanimous)	3	3:00
2021-03-28	Loss	(Japan) Yuma Saikyo	K-1 World GP 2021: K’Festa 4 Day.2	Tokyo, Japan	Decision (Split)	3	3:00
2020-09-22	Loss	(Japan) Koya Urabe	K-1 World GP 2020 in Osaka	Osaka, Japan	Ext.R Decision (Unanimous)	4	3:00
2020-06-28	Loss	(Thailand) Kongnapa Weerasakreck	Krush.113	Tokyo, Japan	Decision (Unanimous)	3	3:00
For the Krush Lightweight (-62.5kg) title.
2019-08-24	Win	(Japan) Shinichiro Kawasaki	K-1 World GP 2019: Japan vs World 5 vs 5 & Special Superfight in Osaka	Osaka, Japan	Decision (Unanimous)	3	3:00
2019-03-10	Win	(Japan) Fumiya Osawa	K-1 World GP 2019: K'FESTA 2	Saitama, Japan	Ext.R Decision (Unanimous)	4	3:00
2018-12-08	Loss	(Japan) Kenta Hayashi	K-1 World GP 2018: K-1 Lightweight World's Strongest Tournament, Semi Finals	Osaka, Japan	KO (Right cross)	1	2:31
2018-12-08	Win	(Thailand) Kongnapa Weerasakreck	K-1 World GP 2018: K-1 Lightweight World's Strongest Tournament, Quarter Finals	Osaka, Japan	TKO (2 Knockdowns/Left hook)	1	0:25
2018-08-05	Win	(Japan) Jun Nakazawa	Krush.91	Tokyo, Japan	Decision (Split)	3	3:00
Wins the Krush Super Lightweight (-65kg) title.
2018-05-17	Win	(Japan) FUMIYA	Krush.88	Tokyo, Japan	TKO (Referee Stoppage/Left Hook)	2	1:50
2018-03-11	Win	(Japan) Takaki Hosogoe	Krush.86	Tokyo, Japan	Decision (Unanimous)	3	3:00
2017-12-27	Win	(Japan) Hayato Suzuki	K-1 WORLD GP 2017 JAPAN ～SURVIVAL WARS 2017～	Tokyo, Japan	Decision (Split)	3	3:00
2017-10-14	Win	(Japan) FUMIYA	KHAOS.4	Tokyo, Japan	KO (Right Cross)	3	1:04
2017-08-20	Win	(Japan) Kensei Kondo	Krush.79 ～in NAGOYA～	Tokyo, Japan	KO (Punches)	2	1:30
2017-02-18	Loss	(Japan) Jun Nakazawa	Krush.73, Tournament Semifinals	Tokyo, Japan	KO (Left Hook)	2	1:50
2016-11-03	Win	(Japan) Tatsuya Mineyama	K-1 World GP 2016 Featherweight Championship Tournament	Tokyo, Japan	Decision (Unanimous)	3	3:00
2016-07-18	Loss	(Japan) Daiki Matsushita	Krush.67	Tokyo, Japan	KO (Knees)	2	0:57
2016-04-24	Win	(Japan) Yuki Koge	K-1 World GP 2016 -60kg Japan Tournament	Tokyo, Japan	KO (Punches)	2	1:15
2014-12-21	Win	(Japan) Shinichiro Kawasaki	DEEP KICK 23	Osaka, Japan	Decision (Unanimous)	3	3:00
2014-11-16	Win	(Japan) Tasuku Kido	HOOST CUP KINGS WEST	Osaka, Japan	KO (Right Cross)	1	1:40
Legend: Win Loss Draw/No contest Notes

=== Amateur record ===
Amateur Kickboxing Record
Date	Result	Opponent	Event	Location	Method	Round	Time
2015-11-21	Win	(Japan) Kensei Kondo	K-1 Koshien 2015 Tournament, Final	Tokyo, Japan	KO (Body strike)	3	1:39
Wins the 2015 K-1 Koshien -65kg title.
2015-08-15	Win	(Japan) Kosuke Morii	K-1 Koshien 2015 Tournament, Semi Final	Tokyo, Japan	Decision	1	2:00
2015-08-15	Win	(Japan) Hyuma Hitachi	K-1 Koshien 2015 Tournament, Quarter Final	Tokyo, Japan	KO		
2015-08-15	Win	(Japan) Seima Sano	K-1 Koshien 2015 Tournament, First Round	Tokyo, Japan	Decision	1	2:00
2014-07-21	Loss	(Japan) Ren Hiramoto	K-1 Koshien 2014 Tournament, Semi Final	Tokyo, Japan	Ext.R Decision (Majority)	2	2:00
2014-07-21	Win	(Japan) Haruma Saikyo	K-1 Koshien 2014 Tournament, Quarter Final	Tokyo, Japan	Decision	1	2:00
2014-07-21	Win	(Japan) Tsubasa Okamoto	K-1 Koshien 2014 Tournament, Second Round	Tokyo, Japan	KO		
2014-07-21	Win	(Japan) Takuya Suzuki	K-1 Koshien 2014 Tournament, First Round	Tokyo, Japan	Decision	3	2:00
2014-02-16	Win	(Japan) Masayasu Nakazato	NJKF 2014 1st	Tokyo, Japan	Decision	3	2:00
Wins the NJKF Amateur -65kg title.
2013-09-22	Loss	(Japan) Kaito Ono	DEEP KICK 17	Osaka, Japan	Decision	3	2:00
For the TOP RUN 65kg title.
2013-07-07	Loss	(Japan) Reo Yuasa	NEXT LEVEL Kansai 8	Osaka, Japan	Decision (Unanimous)	2	3:00
2013-03-17	Loss	(Japan) Yuya Ootara	KJC Jr 7, Semi Final	Osaka, Japan	Ext.R Decision (Split)	3	2:00
2013-03-17	Win	(Japan) Koudai Ishida	KJC Jr 7, Quarter Final	Osaka, Japan	Decision	2	2:00
2013-02-10	Win	(Japan) Kaito	DEEP KICK 14	Osaka, Japan	Decision	3	2:00
Wins the TOP RUN -60kg title.
2012-12-16	Win	(Japan) Renta Nishioka	NEXT☆LEVEL Kansai 3	Osaka, Japan	TKO	1	1:17
2012-10-28	Win	(Japan) Yuma Okamura	NAGOYA KICK ～GUY IS BACK～	Nagoya, Japan	Decision	2	2:00
2012-09-23	Draw	(Japan) Kaito	NEXT LEVEL Kansai 1	Osaka, Japan	Decision	2	2:00
2012-09-23	Win	(Japan) Shun Sakamoto	NEXT LEVEL Kansai 1	Osaka, Japan	KO	2	
2012-07-08	Loss	(Japan) Takayuki Minamino	DEEP KICK 12 - TOP RUN 3	Osaka, Japan	Decision	3	2:00
For the TOP RUN -60kg title.
2012-04-29	Win	(Japan) Izumi Yamada	DEEP KICK 11	Osaka, Japan	Decision	2	2:00
2012-03-04	Loss	(Japan) Yuya Ootara	NEXT LEVEL DOUBLE IMPACT II	Osaka, Japan	Decision	2	2:00
2012-02-05	Win	(Japan) Toshiki Maeda	DEEP KICK 10	Osaka, Japan	Decision	2	2:00
2011-10-23	Win	(Japan) Teruhito Ogura	DEEP KICK 8	Osaka, Japan	Decision	2	2:00
2011-09-04	Win	(Japan) Yuya Ootara	DEEP OSAKA IMPACT	Osaka, Japan	Decision	2	2:00
2011-07-23	Win	(Japan) Shun Sakamoto	KAKUMEI KICKBOXING	Osaka, Japan	Decision	3	1:30
2011-06-19	Win	(Japan) Kazuha Handa	NJKF NEW JAPAN BLOOD 5 & 6	Osaka, Japan	Decision	3	2:00
2011-04-10	Win	(Japan) Jinki Maeda	DEEP KICK 6	Osaka, Japan	Decision (Majority)	2	2:00
Wins TOP RUN -55kg title.
2011-02-27	Win	(Japan) Juri Umaki	NJKF Amateur	Osaka, Japan	KO	1	
2011-02-13	Loss	(Japan) Ren Morita	NAGOYA KICK ～JET CITY～	Osaka, Japan	Decision	2	2:00
2010-12-12	Win	(Japan) Seiya Hirahara	DEEP KICK 5	Osaka, Japan	Decision	2	2:00
Wins TOP RUN -50kg title.
Legend: Win Loss Draw/No contest Notes

== See also ==
- List of male kickboxers
- List of Krush champions
