= Yuzuki Satomi =

Japanese male kickboxer

- Born: 里見 柚己; 3 December 1997 (age 28); Miura, Kanagawa, Japan
- Height: 1.72 m (5 ft 7 1/2 in)
- Weight: 62.5 kg (138 lb; 9 st 12 lb)
- Style: Kickboxing
- Fighting out of: Yokohama, Japan
- Team: LARF Kickboxing Team NOVA (2021-Present); K-1 Gym Yokohama (2017-2020); Yokosukataiga Gym (2013-2016)
- Years active: 2013 - present

Kickboxing record
- Total: 40
- Wins: 25
- By knockout: 10
- Losses: 13
- By knockout: 6
- Draws: 1
- No contests: 1

Yuzuki Satomi is a Japanese kickboxer, currently competing in the lightweight division of K-1. He is a former Krush Lightweight champion and K-1 Lightweight champion.

As of July 2023 he was the No. 7 ranked super bantamweight kickboxer in the world by Combat Press.

== Kickboxing career ==
=== Early career ===
Satomi made his professional in debut with Shin Nihon Kickboxing Association on December 8, 2013, at SNKA SOUL IN THE RING XI. He lost to Yusuke Umeki by unanimous decision.

Satomi scored his first professional victory on March 9, 2014, when he defeated HIRO by unanimous decision at SNKA MAGNUM 34.

On October 26, 2014, Satomi went to a draw with Shinya Fujino at SNKA MAGNUM 36.

Satomi suffered his first professional knockout loss on May 31, 2015, against Hirotatsu Asakawa at Japan Kickboxing Innovation.

On September 20, 2015, Satomi defeated Yuma Shimohigashi by knockout at SNKA TITANS NEOS XVIII.

=== Krush ===
in 2017 Satomi joined the Krush organization and started training out of K-1 Gym Yokohama. He made his debut for the promotion on January 15, 2017, at Krush 72 where he defeated Hikaru Fujihashi by majority decision.

On May 13, 2017, Satomi faced Tenma Sano at KHAOS 2. He lost the fight by unanimous decision.

Satomi faced Glory of Heroes champion Wang Junguang from China at Krush 77 on July 16, 2017. He lost the bout by majority decision.

Satomi was knocked out in just 49 second by Kaito Ozawa with a body kick on February 12, 2018, at Krush 85.

Satomi lost by unanimous decision to Taio Asahisa at Krush 91 on August 5, 2018.

Satomi rebounded on November 21, 2018, at Krush 95 for the 10th anniversary of the promotion. He defeated veteran Masahiro Yamamoto by knockout in the second round with a right hook.

Satomi took part in the 2019 K-1 Super Bantamweight World Tournament on June 30, 2019, where he lost to Fumiya Osawa by unanimous decision in quarterfinals.

In his next bout on September 16, 2019, at Krush 105 he was knocked out in the first round by Takumi Yokoyama with a left hook to the body.

Satomi was scheduled to face Shuji Kawarada at Krush 113 on June 28, 2020. The fight was rescheduled for Krush 115 on July 21, 2020. He lost the fight by unanimous decision.

=== Krush lightweight championship ===
Satomi took part in the Krush lightweight championship tournament, held at Krush 127 on July 24, 2021. He was scheduled to face Shinichiro Kawasaki in the tournament quarterfinals. He won the fight by knockout in the second round. He was scheduled to face Hiroki in the tournament semifinals, held at Krush 129 on September 24, 2021. He won the fight by majority decision. Satomi advanced to the tournament finals, where he faced Shuji Kawarada. He lost the fight by majority decision. Their bout was awarded "Krush Fight of the Year" at the 2021 K-1 awards.

Satomi faced top prospect Ryuka on February 27, 2022, at K-1 World GP 2022 Japan. He won the fight by extension round split decision.

On August 11, 2022, Satomi defeated former Krush super featherweight champion Yuma Saikyo by unanimous decision after scoring a knockdown in the second round.

Satomi challenged Fumiya Osawa for his Krush lightweight title at Krush 145 on January 21, 2023. He initially lost the bout by unanimous decision. The result was later changed into a no contest on January 29, 2023, as Osawa scored a knockdown off of an illegal kick catch. An immediate rematch was scheduled to take place at Krush 150 on June 16, 2023. Satomi won the title by majority decision.

Satomi faced Kento Ito at K-1 World GP 2023: ReBOOT～K-1 ReBIRTH～ on September 10, 2023. He lost the fight by a second-round knockout.

Satomi made his first Krush Lightweight title defense against Kento Ito at Krush 158 on February 24, 2024.

Satomi faced Kiyomitsu Samuel Nagasawa at Krush 164 on August 18, 2024. He won the fight by a first-round knockout.

Satomi faced Aaron Clarke at Krush 167 on November 16, 2024. He won the fight by unanimous decision.

Satomi faced Tomás Aguirre at K-1 World MAX 2025 on February 9, 2025. He won the fight by unanimous decision, with all three judges scoring the bout 30—29 in Satomi's favor.

Satomi faced Suleiman Beterbiev at K-1 Beyond on May 31, 2025. He won the fight by knockout, just 28 seconds into the bout.

Satomi faced Yuma Saikyo at K-1 World MAX 2025 - World Tournament Opening Round on September 7, 2025. He won the fight by split decision after an extra fourth round was fought.

On November 15, 2025, it was announced that Satomi would face Hirotaka Asahisa for the vacant K-1 Lightweight (-62.5kg) title at K-1 World GP 2026 -90kg World Tournament on February 8, 2026. He won the fight by unanimous decision, after an extra fourth round was contested.

== Titles and accomplishments ==
- Krush
  - 2023 Krush Lightweight (-62.5 kg) Champion
  - 2021 Fight of the Year Award (vs. Shuji Kawarada)
- K-1
  - 2026 K-1 Lightweight (-62.5kg) Champion

== Fight record ==
Professional Muay Thai Kickboxing record
25 Wins (10 (T)KO's), 13 Losses, 1 Draw, 1 No Contest
Date	Result	Opponent	Event	Location	Method	Round	Time
2026-12-29		(Japan) Hirotaka Asahisa	K-1 World MAX 2026 - World Championship Tournament Final	Yokohama, Japan			
2026-09-12	Loss	(Japan) Kiyomitsu Samuel Nagasawa	K-1 World MAX 2026 - World Tournament Opening Round	Tokyo, Japan	TKO (referee stoppage)	2	1:41
Defending the K-1 Lightweight (-62.5kg) title.
2026-02-08	Win	(Japan) Hirotaka Asahisa	K-1 World GP 2026 - 90kg World Tournament	Tokyo, Japan	Ext.R Decision (Unanimous)	4	3:00
Wins the vacant K-1 Lightweight (-62.5kg) title.
2025-09-07	Win	(Japan) Yuma Saikyo	K-1 World MAX 2025 - World Tournament Opening Round	Tokyo, Japan	Ext.R Decision (Split)	4	3:00
2025-05-31	Win	(Russia) Suleiman Beterbiev	K-1 Beyond	Yokohama, Japan	KO (Left cross)	1	0:28
2025-02-09	Win	(Argentina) Tomás Aguirre	K-1 World MAX 2025	Tokyo, Japan	Decision (Unanimous)	3	3:00
2024-11-16	Win	(Republic of Ireland) Aaron Clarke	Krush 167	Tokyo, Japan	Decision (Unanimous)	3	3:00
2022-08-18	Win	(Japan) Kiyomitsu Samuel Nagasawa	Krush 164	Tokyo, Japan	KO (Punches)	1	1:57
2024-02-24	Loss	(Japan) Kento Ito	Krush 158	Tokyo, Japan	KO (Right cross)	1	0:38
Loses the Krush Lightweight title.
2023-09-10	Loss	(Japan) Kento Ito	K-1 World GP 2023: ReBOOT～K-1 ReBIRTH～	Yokohama, Japan	KO (Referee stop/punches)	2	2:18
2023-06-16	Win	(Japan) Fumiya Osawa	Krush 150	Tokyo, Japan	Decision (Majority)	3	3:00
Wins the Krush Lightweight title.
2023-01-21	NC	(Japan) Fumiya Osawa	Krush 145	Tokyo, Japan	No Contest	3	3:00
For the Krush Lightweight title. Originally a unanimous decision win for Osawa overturned to a no contest due to an illegal kick catch leading to a knockdown.
2022-08-11	Win	(Japan) Yuma Saikyo	K-1 World GP 2022 in Fukuoka	Fukuoka, Japan	Decision (Unanimous)	3	3:00
2022-02-27	Win	(Japan) Ryuka	K-1 World GP 2022 Japan	Tokyo, Japan	Ext.R Decision (Split)	4	3:00
2021-09-24	Loss	(Japan) Shuji Kawarada	Krush 129, Lightweight Championship Tournament Final	Tokyo, Japan	Decision (Majority)	3	3:00
For the vacant Krush Lightweight title.
2021-09-24	Win	(Japan) Hiroki	Krush 129, Lightweight Championship Tournament Semifinal	Tokyo, Japan	Decision (Majority)	3	3:00
2021-09-24	Win	(Japan) Shinichiro Kawasaki	Krush 127, Lightweight Championship Tournament Quarterfinal	Tokyo, Japan	TKO (3 knockdowns)	2	2:54
2021-04-23	Win	(Japan) Tsubasa Horii	Krush 124	Tokyo, Japan	Decision (Unanimous)	3	3:00
2020-07-21	Loss	(Japan) Shuji Kawarada	Krush 115	Tokyo, Japan	Decision (Unanimous)	3	3:00
2020-01-25	Win	(Japan) Daiki Kaneko	Krush 110	Tokyo, Japan	TKO (3 knockdowns)	3	2:02
2019-09-16	Loss	(Japan) Takumi Yokoyama	Krush 105	Tokyo, Japan	KO (Left hook to the body)	1	2:50
2019-06-30	Loss	(Japan) Fumiya Osawa	K-1 World GP 2019: Super Bantamweight World Tournament	Tokyo, Japan	Decision (Unanimous)	3	3:00
2019-02-16	Win	(Japan) Syun Kentoshi	Krush 98	Tokyo, Japan	Decision (Unanimous)	3	3:00
2018-11-21	Win	(Japan) Masahiro Yamamoto	Krush 95	Tokyo, Japan	KO (Left hook)	2	1:59
2018-08-05	Loss	(Japan) Taio Asahisa	Krush.91	Tokyo, Japan	Decision (Unanimous)	3	3:00
2018-05-17	Win	(Japan) Takuma Kawaguchi	Krush 88	Tokyo, Japan	Decision (Majority)	3	3:00
2018-02-12	Loss	(Japan) Kaito Ozawa	Krush.85	Tokyo, Japan	KO (Left body kick)	1	0:49
2017-09-08	Win	(Japan) Takeshi Watanabe	Krush 80	Tokyo, Japan	KO (Flying knee)	3	2:31
2017-07-16	Loss	(China) Wang Junguang	Glory of Heroes: Japan & Krush.77	Tokyo, Japan	Decision (Majority)	3	3:00
2017-05-13	Loss	(Japan) Tenma Sano	KHAOS 2	Tokyo, Japan	Decision (Unanimous)	3	3:00
2017-03-18	Win	(Japan) Kyohei Hayashi	KHAOS 1	Tokyo, Japan	KO (Left hook)	2	0:47
2017-01-15	Win	(Japan) Hikaru Fujihashi	Krush 72	Tokyo, Japan	Decision (Majority)	3	3:00
2015-09-20	Win	(Japan) Yuma Shimohigashi	SNKA TITANS NEOS XVIII	Tokyo, Japan	KO	1	0:29
2015-05-31	Loss	(Japan) Hirotatsu Asakawa	Japan Kickboxing Innovation	Chūō, Japan	KO	2	2:00
2015-03-15	Win	(Japan) Kazumi	SNKA MAGNUM 37	Tokyo, Japan	Decision (Unanimous)	3	3:00
2014-10-26	Draw	(Japan) Shinya Fujino	SNKA MAGNUM 36	Tokyo, Japan	Decision (Majority)	2	3:00
2014-07-20	Win	(Japan) Raijin Hamada	SNKA MAGNUM 35	Tokyo, Japan	KO (Punch)	1	1:19
2014-03-09	Win	(Japan) HIRO	SNKA MAGNUM 34	Tokyo, Japan	Decision (Unanimous)	2	3:00
2013-12-08	Loss	(Japan) Yusuke Umeki	SNKA SOUL IN THE RING XI	Tokyo, Japan	Decision (Unanimous)	2	3:00
Legend: Win Loss Draw/No contest Notes

== See also ==
- List of male kickboxers
