= Shuji Kawarada =

Japanese kickboxer (born 1994)

- Born: 瓦田 脩二; 18 April 1994 (age 32); Kitakyushu, Japan
- Nationality: Japanese
- Height: 1.79 m (5 ft 10 1/2 in)
- Weight: 62.5 kg (138 lb; 9 st 12 lb)
- Style: Kickboxing
- Fighting out of: Shinjuku, Tokyo, Japan
- Team: K-1 Gym Headquarters Team Pegasus
- Years active: 2017 - present

Kickboxing record
- Total: 25
- Wins: 15
- By knockout: 6
- Losses: 10
- By knockout: 2

Shuji Kawarada (瓦田 脩二, born 18 April 1994) is a Japanese kickboxer, currently competing in the lightweight division of K-1. A professional competitor since 2017, he is the former Krush Lightweight champion, having held the title from 2021 to 2022.

He was ranked as a top ten super bantamweight kickboxer by Combat Press between August 2021 and March 2022, as well as between May and June 2022.

== Kickboxing career ==
=== Early career ===
Kawarada made his professional debut against Koji Suzuki at Krush 80 on September 8, 2017. He won the fight by a first-round stoppage, knocking out Suzuki with a right straight at the 2:25 minute mark.

Kawarada was scheduled to face Takahito Oki at Krush 82 on November 5, 2017. He won the fight by a second-round technical knockout, successfully knocking Oki down three times inside the distance.

Kawarada was scheduled to face Kazuki Yamashita at Krush 84 on January 27, 2018. He won the fight by unanimous decision, with scores of 30–28, 30–29 and 30–27.

Kawarada was scheduled to face Yuki Takeuchi at Krush 87 on April 22, 2018. He won the fight by a third-round technical knockout, managing to knock Takeuchi down three times in under two and a half minutes.

Kawarada was scheduled to face Kota Nakano at Krush 90 on July 22, 2018. He won the fight by unanimous decision, with scores of 29–27, 29–28 and 30–27. Kawarada scored the sole knockdown of the fight in the second round, dropping Nakano with a right straight.

==== First losses ====
Kawarada made his K-1 debut against Hisaki Higashimoto at K-1 World GP 2018: inaugural Cruiserweight Championship Tournament on September 24, 2018. He lost the fight by majority decision, with scores of 28–28, 29–28 and 30–27.

Kawarada was scheduled to face Hikaru Hasumi at Krush 97 on January 26, 2019. He won the fight by a third-round knockout. Kawarada finished Hasumi with a knee strike in the very last second of the bout.

Kawarada was scheduled to face Shinichiro Kawasaki at K-1 KRUSH FIGHT 99 on March 30, 2019. He was knocked down three times in the first round, which resulted in an automatic TKO loss.

Kawarada was scheduled to face Zhiwei Wang at K-1 KRUSH FIGHT 103 on July 21, 2019. Wang won the fight by unanimous decision.

=== Winning streak ===
After losing two consecutive fights for the first time in his career, Kawarada was scheduled to face Shu Inagaki at K-1 KRUSH FIGHT 109 on December 15, 2019. Kawarada rebounded from his losses with a first-round knockout victory.

Kawarada was scheduled to face Yuzuki Satomi at Krush 113 on June 28, 2020. The fight was eventually rescheduled for Krush 115 on July 21, 2020. Kawarada won the fight by unanimous decision, with all three judges scoring the fight 30–28 in his favor.

Kawarada made his return to K-1 K-1 World GP 2020 in Osaka on September 22, 2020, when he was scheduled to face Seiya Ueda. He won the fight by unanimous decision.

Kawarada was scheduled to face the 2018 K-1 Lightweight grand prix finalist Fumiya Osawa at K-1 World GP 2020 Winter's Crucial Bout on December 13, 2020. He won the fight by split decision, after an extra round was fought.

Kawarada was scheduled to face Hisaki Higashimoto at K'Festa 4 Day 1 on March 21, 2021. He won the fight by a first-round technical knockout.

=== Krush Lightweight champion ===
==== Krush Super Bantamweight tournament ====
Kawarada participated in the Krush lightweight tournament, held at Krush 127 on July 24, 2021. He was scheduled to face Shoya in the tournament quarterfinals. He won the fight by unanimous decision, with scores of 30–27, 30–26 and 30–25. Kawarada was scheduled to face Daiki Nagumo in the tournament semifinals, held at Krush 129 on September 24, 2021. He won the fight by a third-round knockout, forcing Nagumo to take a knee with numerous body punches and which left him unable to rise in time for the eight count. Kawarada advanced to the tournament finals, where he faced Yuzuki Satomi, who had earned his place there with a majority decision win against Hiroki. Kawarada won the fight by majority decision, with two of the three judges awarding him a 30-29 scorecard.

==== Title reign ====
Kawarada was scheduled to face the former Krush Super Lightweight champion Yuto Shinohara at K-1 World GP 2022 Japan on February 27, 2022. He lost the fight by unanimous decision, with all three judges scoring the bout 30–29 in Shinohara's favor.

Kawarada was booked to make his first Krush lightweight title defense against Fumiya Osawa at Krush 136 on April 30, 2022. He lost the fight by unanimous decision, with scores of 30–28, 30–28 and 30–27.

=== Post title reign ===
Kawarada faced Shoya at Krush 142 on October 28, 2022. The bout was a rematch of their Krush 127 fight, which Kawarada won by unanimous decision. Kawarada lost the fight by split decision, after an extra fourth round was fought.

Kawarada faced Haru Furumiya at Krush 148 on April 28, 2023. He lost the fight by unanimous decision, with all three judges scoring the bout 30–29 for Furumiya.

Kawarada faced Kenshin Kodama at Krush 157 on January 28, 2024. He lost the fight by a third-round knockout.

Kawarada faced Ryunosuke at K-1 Dontaku on July 13, 2025. He lost the fight by unanimous decision, with scores of 30—29, 30—29 and 30—29.

== Titles and accomplishments ==
=== Professional ===
- Krush
  - 2021 Krush Lightweight (-62.5 kg) Champion
  - 2021 Fight of the Year Award (vs. Yuzuki Satomi)

=== Amateur ===
- 2017 K-1 All Japan A-class -65 kg Champion
- 2016 WBMF International Thai Martial Arts Games 63.5 kg (gold)
- 2015 All Japan College Kickboxing Lightweight Champion

== Fight record ==
Professional Kickboxing Record
15 Wins (6 (T)KO's), 10 Losses, 0 Draw, 0 No Contest
Date	Result	Opponent	Event	Location	Method	Round	Time
2025-07-13	Loss	(Japan) Ryunosuke	K-1 Dontaku	Fukuoka, Japan	Decision (Unanimous)	3	3:00
2024-11-16	Loss	(Japan) Kiyomitsu Samuel Nagasawa	Krush 167	Tokyo, Japan	Decision (Unanimous)	3	3:00
2024-01-28	Loss	(Japan) Kenshin Kodama	Krush 157	Tokyo, Japan	KO (High kick)	3	0:33
2023-10-15	Win	(Japan) Ayumu Yamamoto	Kyushu Professional Kickboxing vol.15	Fukuoka, Japan	Decision (Unanimous)	3	3:00
2023-04-28	Loss	(Japan) Haru Furumiya	Krush 148	Tokyo, Japan	Decision (Unanimous)	3	3:00
2022-10-28	Loss	(Japan) Shoya	Krush 142	Tokyo, Japan	Ext.R Decision (Split)	4	3:00
2022-04-30	Loss	(Japan) Fumiya Osawa	Krush 136	Tokyo, Japan	Decision (Unanimous)	3	3:00
Loses the Krush Lightweight title.
2022-02-27	Loss	(Japan) Yuto Shinohara	K-1 World GP 2022 Japan	Tokyo, Japan	Decision (Unanimous)	3	3:00
2021-09-24	Win	(Japan) Yuzuki Satomi	Krush 129, Lightweight Championship Tournament Final	Tokyo, Japan	Decision (Majority)	3	3:00
Wins the vacant Krush Lightweight title.
2021-09-24	Win	(Japan) Daiki Nagumo	Krush 129, Lightweight Championship Tournament Semi Final	Tokyo, Japan	KO (Punches)	3	1:33
2021-07-24	Win	(Japan) Shoya	Krush 127, Lightweight Championship Tournament Quarter Final	Tokyo, Japan	Decision (Unanimous)	3	3:00
2021-03-21	Win	(Japan) Hisaki Higashimoto	K'Festa 4 Day 1	Tokyo, Japan	TKO (Doctor stoppage)	1	1:20
2020-12-13	Win	(Japan) Fumiya Osawa	K-1 World GP 2020 Winter's Crucial Bout	Tokyo, Japan	Ext. R. Decision (Split)	3	3:00
2020-09-22	Win	(Japan) Seiya Ueda	K-1 World GP 2020 in Osaka	Osaka, Japan	Decision (Unanimous)	3	3:00
2020-07-21	Win	(Japan) Yuzuki Satomi	Krush 115	Tokyo, Japan	Decision (Unanimous)	3	3:00
2019-12-15	Win	(Japan) Shu Inagaki	Krush 109	Tokyo, Japan	KO (Right Hook)	1	2:40
2019-07-21	Loss	(China) Wang Zhiwei	Krush 103	Tokyo, Japan	Decision (Unanimous)	3	3:00
2019-03-30	Loss	(Japan) Shinichiro Kawasaki	Krush 99	Tokyo, Japan	TKO (Three knockdowns)	1	2:45
2019-01-26	Win	(Japan) Hikaru Hasumi	Krush 97	Tokyo, Japan	KO (Knee)	3	2:59
2018-09-24	Loss	(Japan) Hisaki Higashimoto	K-1 World GP 2018: inaugural Cruiserweight Championship Tournament	Saitama, Japan	Decision (Majority)	3	3:00
2018-07-22	Win	(Japan) Kota Nakano	Krush 90	Tokyo, Japan	Decision (Unanimous)	3	3:00
2018-04-22	Win	(Japan) Yuki Takeuchi	Krush 87	Tokyo, Japan	TKO (Three knockdowns)	1	2:21
2018-01-27	Win	(Japan) Kazuki Yamashita	Krush 84	Tokyo, Japan	Decision (Unanimous)	3	3:00
2017-11-05	Win	(Japan) Takahito Oki	Krush 82	Tokyo, Japan	TKO (Three knockdowns)	2	2:25
2017-09-08	Win	(Japan) Koji Suzuki	Krush 80	Tokyo, Japan	KO (Right straight)	1	2:25
Legend: Win Loss Draw/No contest Notes

Amateur Kickboxing & Muay Thai Record
Date	Result	Opponent	Event	Location	Method	Round	Time
2017-06-25	Win	(Japan) Hikaru Katase	4th K-1 Amateur All Japan Tournament, Final	Tokyo, Japan	Decision (Unanimous)	1	2:00
Wins K-1 All Japan A-class -65kg title.
2017-06-25	Win	(Japan) Kazuki Matsumoto	4th K-1 Amateur All Japan Tournament, Semi Final	Tokyo, Japan	KO	1	
2017-03-26	Win	(Japan) Koji Suzuki	K-1 Amateur All Japan Selection Tournament, Final	Tokyo, Japan	KO	1	
2017-03-26	Win	(Japan) Akitoshi Nakajima	K-1 Amateur All Japan Selection Tournament, Semi Final	Tokyo, Japan	Decision (Unanimous)	1	2:00
2017-03-26	Win	(Japan) Kazuki Matsumoto	K-1 Amateur All Japan Selection Tournament, Quarter Final	Tokyo, Japan	KO	1	
2016-12-11	Win	(Japan) Naoyuki Arakawa	K-1 Amateur	Tokyo, Japan	KO	1	
2016-07-31	Loss	(Japan) Kosuke Morii	2016 K-1 College Tournament, Semi Final	Tokyo, Japan	Ext.R Decision (Unanimous)	2	2:00
2016-07-31	Win	(Japan) Yushi Shishido	2016 K-1 College Tournament, Quarter Final	Tokyo, Japan	Decision (Majority)	1	2:00
2016-06-19	Win	(Japan) Kyosuke Takahashi	84th All Japan College Kickboxing Championship	Tokyo, Japan	Decision (Unanimous)	3	2:00
2016-03-	Win	(Thailand) Ancha Sorpa	1st WMBF International Thai Martial Arts Games & Festival, Final	Bangkok, Thailand	Decision		
Wins WBMF International Thai Martial Arts Games 63.5kg title.
2016-03-	Win	(Greece)	1st WMBF International Thai Martial Arts Games & Festival, Semi Final	Bangkok, Thailand	Decision		
2016-03-	Win	(Palestine)	1st WMBF International Thai Martial Arts Games & Festival, Quarter Final	Bangkok, Thailand	Decision		
2015-11-28	Win	(Japan) Kazu Kitsukawa	83rd All Japan College Kickboxing Championship Final	Tokyo, Japan	KO (Punches)	1	2:07
Wins All Japan College Kickboxing Lightweight title.
2015-09-06	Win	(Japan) Kenji Onami	All Japan College Kickboxing UKF Selection	Tokyo, Japan	Decision (Unanimous)	3	2:00
2015-06-21	Win	(Japan) Kento Furuya	82nd All Japan College Kickboxing Championship	Tokyo, Japan	KO	1	2:09
2014-12-23	Win	(Japan) Takatoshi Higuchi	REBELS Amateur BLOW CUP 34	Tokyo, Japan	Decision (Majority)		
2014-11-29	Loss	(Japan) Mizuho Besshi	80th All Japan College Kickboxing Championship	Tokyo, Japan	KO	1	
2014-09-07	Loss	(Japan) Shunsuke Inoue	All Japan College Kickboxing UKF Selection	Tokyo, Japan	Decision (Majority)		
2014-02-16	Win	(Japan) Shotaro Yamaguchi	17th College Kickboxing UKF	Tokyo, Japan	KO	3	1:33
Legend: Win Loss Draw/No contest Notes

== See also ==
- List of male kickboxers
