= Kotaro Shimano =

Japanese kickboxer (born 1992)

- Born: 島野 浩太朗; June 8, 1992 (age 34); Futtsu, Japan
- Nationality: Japanese
- Height: 174 cm (5 ft 9 in)
- Weight: 60.0 kg (132.3 lb; 9.45 st)
- Division: Flyweight
- Style: Kickboxing
- Stance: Orthodox
- Fighting out of: Futtsu, Japan
- Team: Sugahara Dojo
- Years active: 2011–2024

Kickboxing record
- Total: 44
- Wins: 28
- By knockout: 17
- Losses: 16
- By knockout: 3

Kotaro Shimano (born 8 June 1992) is a retired Japanese kickboxer, who fought out of Futtsu, Japan. He is the former Krush Super Featherweight champion. Shimano was continuously ranked as a top ten –60 kg (132 lbs) kickboxer by Combat Press between May 2019 and June 2021.

== Kickboxing career ==
Shimano enjoyed one of the best runs of his career in 2014, when he went on a five fight winning streak, including a first round TKO of Leona Pettas. This run earned a chance to fight Hirotaka Urabe for the Krush Super Featherweight title. He failed to capture the title, as Urabe won a unanimous decision.

He lost three of his next four fights, before entering the 2016 K-1 Super Featherweight Grand Prix. He managed a TKO win against Hitoshi Aketo in the quarterfinal, but lost by TKO to Koya Urabe in the semifinals.

In July 2016, Shimano fought Motoki for the MA Japan Kick Super Featherweight title. He won the fight by unanimous decision. He would lose two of his next three fights, before successfully defending the MA Japan title, with a second round KO of Ryoji Washio.

Shimano fought Masanobu Goshu for the Krush Super Featherweight title at Krush 89. He won the fight by unanimous decision. After defeating Rungphet Wor Rungniran, Shimano was scheduled to defend his Krush title for the first time at Krush 96, when he faced Tatsuya Oiwa. The fight went into an extra round, after which Shimano won a decision.

Shimano was scheduled to defend his Krush title for the second time against Yuma Saikyo at Krush 99. Saikyo won the fight by unanimous decision.

During the MA Japan Kick - Soeno Dojo 50th Anniversary event, Shimano was scheduled to fight Tapejyun Saichan for the WMAF World Super Featherweight title. He won the fight by a split decision, after an extra round was fought. He would follow this up with a second win with MA Japan, as he scored a knockout over Woo Seung Beom. Shimano extended his winning streak to four, with a unanimous decision win against Satoru Nariai, and a TKO win against Junpei Sano.

He was scheduled to fight Ryusei Ashizawa at K-1 World GP 2020 in Tokyo. Ashizawa won the fight by TKO in the second round after a back and forth round, during which both Ashizawa and Shimano were knocked down.

He won a unanimous decision against Yuki Miwa at K-1 World GP 2021: K’Festa 4 Day.2. Shimano was afterwards scheduled to fight Sano Tenma at K-1 World GP 2021: Japan Bantamweight Tournament.

Shimano was scheduled to face Hirotaka Urabe in a 61 kg catchweight bout at K-1 World GP 2022 Japan on February 27, 2022. He won the fight by a third-round knockout, flooring Urabe with a right cross.

Shimano made his second WMAF World Super Featherweight title defense against Yugo Flyskygym at MA Japan Kick - Tekken 14 on August 28, 2022. He won the fight by knockout in the first minute.

Shimano faced the former Krush Featherweight and K-1 Featherweight champion Yuki Egawa at K-1 World GP 2022 in Osaka on December 3, 2022. He lost the fight by a first-round technical knockout.

Shimano announced his retirement from the sport of kickboxing on January 2, 2024.

== Titles and accomplishments ==
- 2014 Krush -60 kg WILDRUSH League Winner
- 2016 MAJKF Super Featherweight Champion
- 2018 Krush Super Featherweight Champion
- 2019 WMAF World Super Featherweight Champion

== Professional kickboxing record ==
Professional Kickboxing Record
28 Wins (17 (T)KO's), 16 Losses, 0 Draw, 0 No Contest
Date	Result	Opponent	Event	Location	Method	Round	Time
2022-12-03	Loss	(Japan) Yuki Egawa	K-1 World GP 2022 in Osaka	Osaka, Japan	TKO (Punches)	1	1:58
2022-08-28	Win	(Japan) Yugo Flyskygym	MAJKF - Tekken 14	Tokyo, Japan	KO (Right hook)	1	0:50
Defends the WMAF World Super Featherweight title.
2022-02-27	Win	(Japan) Hirotaka Urabe	K-1 World GP 2022 Japan	Tokyo, Japan	KO (Right cross)	3	2:51
2021-05-30	Loss	(Japan) Tenma Sano	K-1 World GP 2021: Japan Bantamweight Tournament	Tokyo, Japan	Decision (Unanimous)	3	3:00
2021-03-28	Win	(Japan) Yuki Miwa	K-1 World GP 2021: K’Festa 4 Day.2	Tokyo, Japan	Decision (Unanimous)	3	3:00
2020-12-13	Loss	(Japan) Ryusei Ashizawa	K-1 World GP 2020 Winter's Crucial Bout	Tokyo, Japan	KO (Punches)	2	3:00
2020-09-26	Win	(Japan) Junpei Sano	Krush.117	Tokyo, Japan	KO (3 Knockdowns)	1	1:32
2019-12-15	Win	(Japan) Satoru Nariai	Krush.109	Tokyo, Japan	Decision (Unanimous)	3	3:00
2019-07-07	Win	(Korea) Woo Seung Beom	MAJKF - Tekken 12	Chiba (city), Japan	KO (Right Straight)	1	2:51
2019-04-21	Win	(Japan) Tapejyun Saichan	MAJKF - Soeno Dojo 50th Anniversary	Tokyo, Japan	Ext.R Decision (Split)	4	3:00
Wins the WMAF World Super Featherweight title.
2019-03-09	Loss	(Japan) Yuma Saikyo	Krush.99	Tokyo, Japan	Decision (Unanimous)	3	3:00
Lost the Krush Super Featherweight title.
2018-12-16	Win	(Japan) Tatsuya Oiwa	Krush.96	Tokyo, Japan	Ext.R Decision (Unanimous)	4	3:00
Defends the Krush Super Featherweight title.
2018-07-29	Win	(Thailand) Rungphet Wor Rungniran	MAJKF - Tekken 11	Chiba (city), Japan	Decision (Unanimous)	3	3:00
2018-06-30	Win	(Japan) Masanobu Goshu	Krush.89	Tokyo, Japan	Decision (Unanimous)	3	3:00
Wins the Krush Super Featherweight title.
2018-03-10	Win	(Japan) Naoki Yamamoto	Krush.86	Tokyo, Japan	KO (Left Hook)	1	1:53
2017-09-18	Loss	(Japan) Kouzi	K-1 World GP 2016 -60kg World Tournament	Tokyo, Japan	Decision (Unanimous)	3	3:00
2017-07-17	Win	(Thailand) Jira Banchamek	MAJKF - Tekken 10	Chiba (city), Japan	Decision (Unanimous)	3	3:00
2017-04-30	Win	(Japan) Ryoji Washio	MAJKF - Festival of Martial Arts～FIGHT FOR PEACE8～	Tokyo, Japan	KO	2	1:51
Defends MAJKF Super Featherweight title.
2017-03-03	Win	(Japan) "Dynamite" Yuta Takahashi	Krush.74	Tokyo, Japan	Decision (Unanimous)	3	3:00
2016-12-04	Loss	(Japan) Ryuki	MAJKF - Tekken 9	Japan	Decision (Majority)	3	3:00
2016-10-15	Loss	(Japan) Hayato	Krush.70	Tokyo, Japan	Decision (Unanimous)	3	3:00
2016-07-24	Win	(Japan) Motoki	MAJKF - Tekken 8	Chiba (city), Japan	Decision (Unanimous)	3	3:00
Wins MAJKF Super Featherweight title.
2016-04-24	Loss	(Japan) Koya Urabe	K-1 World GP 2016 -60kg Japan Tournament, Semi Finals	Tokyo, Japan	KO (Left Low Kicks)	2	0:51
2016-04-24	Win	(Japan) Hitoshi Aketo	K-1 World GP 2016 -60kg Japan Tournament, Quarter Finals	Tokyo, Japan	KO (2 Knockdows/Left Hook)	1	2:55
2016-02-05	Loss	(Japan) Hitoshi Aketo	Krush.63	Tokyo, Japan	Ext.R Decision (Unanimous)	4	3:00
2016-02-05	Loss	(Japan) Fumiya Osawa	K-1 World GP 2015 The Championship	Tokyo, Japan	Decision (Unanimous)	3	3:00
2015-10-11	Win	(Japan) Kensuke Tomita	MAJKF - Tekken 7	Tokyo, Japan	TKO (Corner Stoppage)	1	2:03
2015-01-18	Loss	(Spain) Javier Hernandez	K-1 World GP 2015 -60kg Championship Tournament, Quarter Finals	Tokyo, Japan	Decision (Unanimous)	3	3:00
2014-11-09	Loss	(Japan) Hirotaka Urabe	Krush.47	Tokyo, Japan	Decision (Unanimous)	3	3:00
For the Krush Super Featherweight title.
2014-10-05	Win	(Japan) Tomohiro Kitai	Krush.46	Tokyo, Japan	KO (Left Hook)	1	0:28
2014-09-16	Win	(Japan) Shota Hamada	MAJKF - Tekken 6	Chiba (city), Japan	Decision (Unanimous)	3	3:00
2014-07-13	Win	(Japan) Toshi	Krush.43	Tokyo, Japan	KO (Punches)	2	2:32
2014-05-11	Win	(Japan) Takeshi Watanabe	Krush.41	Tokyo, Japan	Decision (Unanimous)	3	3:00
2014-03-08	Win	(Japan) Leona Pettas	Krush.39	Tokyo, Japan	TKO (Doctor Stoppage)	1	1:03
2014-01-04	Loss	(Japan) Fumiya Osawa	Krush 36	Tokyo, Japan	Decision (Majority)	3	3:00
2013-10-13	Loss	(Japan) Go Kato	Krush-IGNITION 2013 vol.7	Tokyo, Japan	Decision (Majority)	3	3:00
2012-11-23	Win	(Japan) Satoi	Krush-EX 2012 vol.6	Tokyo, Japan	KO (Left Hook)	3	0:46
2012-07-29	Win	(Japan) Ryoji	MAJKF - Tekken 5	Chiba (city), Japan	KO	1	
2012-06-17	Loss	(Japan) Go Kato	Krush-EX 2012 vol.3	Tokyo, Japan	KO	3	0:52
2012-04-08	Loss	(Japan) Hirotaka Hadachi	NJKF Superkick	Chiba (city), Japan	Decision (Unanimous)	3	3:00
2012-02-17	Win	(Japan) Tomohiro Kitai	Krush 16	Tokyo, Japan	KO (Right Straight)	1	1:01
2011-12-10	Win	(Japan) Takashi Ohata	Krush‐EX 2011 FINAL	Tokyo, Japan	KO (Right Straight)	3	0:55
2011-11-12	Win	(Japan) Susumu Sekine	Krush 13	Tokyo, Japan	Decision (Unanimous)	3	3:00
2011-07-31	Win	(Thailand)		Hua Hin, Thailand	KO	3	
Legend: Win Loss Draw/No contest Notes

== See also ==
- List of male kickboxers
