= Krush (kickboxing) =

Martial-arts entertainment planning and promotion

- Type: Private
- Industry: Martial-arts entertainment planning and promotion
- Founded: 2008
- Headquarters: Tokyo, Japan
- Owner: Good Loser
- Website: Krush

Krush is a martial arts entertainment planning and promotional brand established in 2008. Currently based in Japan, it is the sister brand of K-1. Krush promotes kickboxing events across ten male and three female weight classes. It is considered to be the second tier of K-1, and has produced numerous K-1 competitors; such as Takeru Segawa, Tatsuya Tsubakihara and Yuki Egawa.

== Current Krush champions ==
Division	Champion	Since	Title defences
Cruiserweight (-90 kg)	Vacant		0
Middleweight (-75 kg)	Vacant		
Super Welterweight (-70 kg)	Vacant		
Welterweight (-67.5 kg)	(Japan) Koya Saito	December 19, 2025	0
Super Lightweight (-65 kg)	(Japan) Shu Inagaki	April 28, 2023	1
Lightweight (-62.5 kg)	(Japan) Kenshin Kodama	October 31, 2026	0
Super Featherweight (-60 kg)	(Japan) Kanata Ueno	Aug 30, 2026	0
Featherweight (-57.5 kg)	Vacant		
Super Bantamweight (-55 kg)	(Japan) Riamu Sera	October 31, 2021	3
Bantamweight (-53 kg)	(Japan) Ryu Ohira	October 31, 2026	0
Flyweight (-51.5 kg)	Vacant		
Women's Flyweight (-52 kg)	(Greece) Sofia Tsolakidou	August 23, 2025	0
Women's Minimumweight (-48 kg)	Vacant		
Women's Atomweight (-45 kg)	Vacant		0

== History ==
Krush was launched in 2008 as a collaboration between K-1 and All Japan Kickboxing Federation. Krush was seen as a feeder organization and the second tier of K-1 competition.

On June 22, 2009, organization representative Toshio Kaneda was arrested, alongside seven other members of the executive committee. Following their arrests, the AJKF was dissolved. The remaining committee and staff members founded "Good Loser", a parent company which continued organizing events under the Krush brand. Former kickboxer Satoshi Kobayashi was appointed as the general manager.

On July 24, 2009, Krush held their first tournament. The grand prix was scheduled to crown the new lightweight champion and included 16 participants.

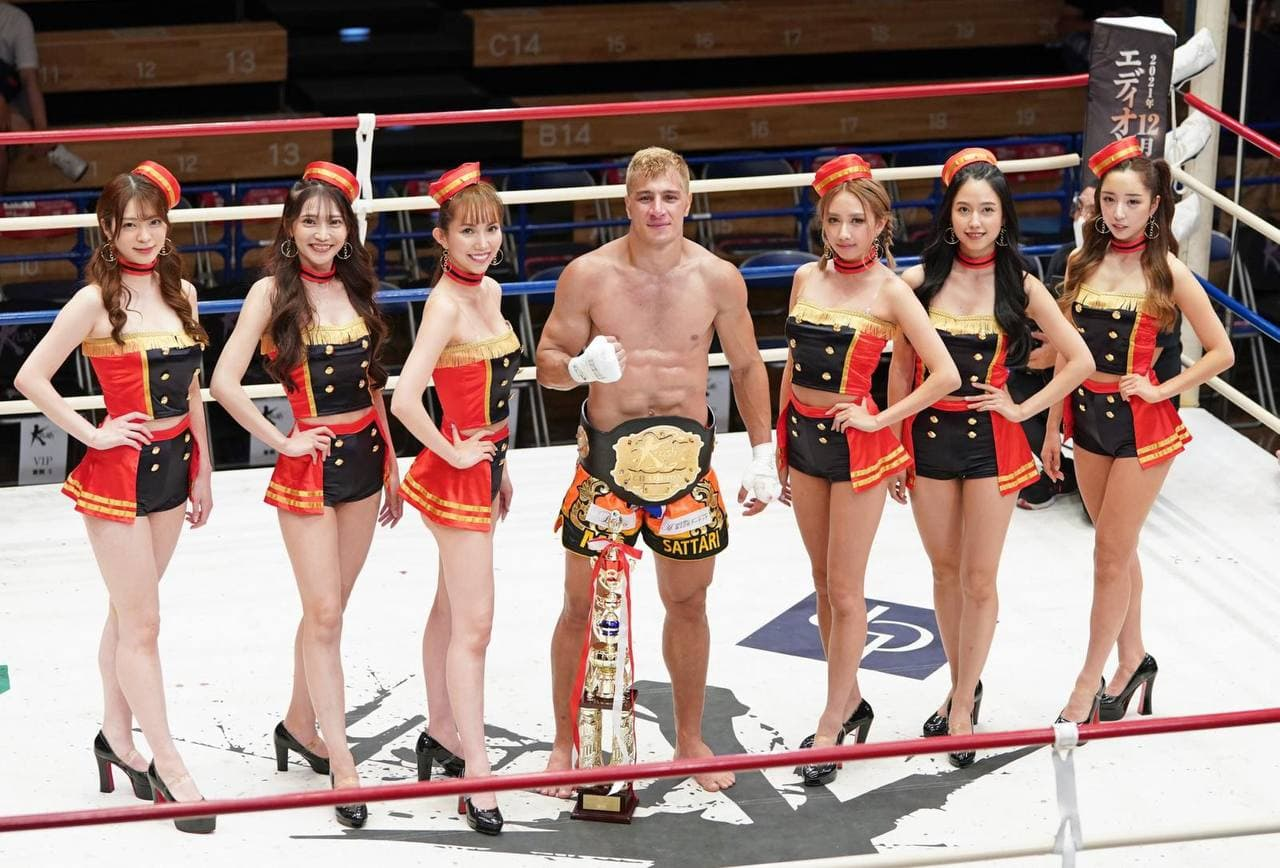
Krush 127 (24 July 2021), Mahmoud Sattari wins World Cruiserweight Title.

On August 8, 2012, Krush signed a partnership agreement with Pancrase. It was the first such agreement in the four-year history of the organization up to that point.

It was confirmed in early 2014 that Krush would begin organizing women's fights, as well as female title fights. The first Krush women's champion was crowned on March 17, 2014, when Syuri became the inaugural flyweight champion.

On May 29, 2014, two years after the bankruptcy of K-1's parent Fighting and Entertainment Group in 2012, and the sale of its brands and trademarks, K-1 World League was launched (later renamed to K-1 World GP). As such, the two organizations resumed their partnership.

From 2017 onward, cross-promotional events with Chinese organizations such as Wu Lin Feng and GLORY OF HEROS were held every summer, featuring Chinese fighters competing against their Japanese counterparts.

On January 26, 2019, Krush was renamed "K-1 KRUSH FIGHT" to further announce the connection between the two brands. However, on December 7, 2019, it was renamed back to Krush. The aim of renaming the competition back to Krush was to dispel the image of the brand as the second tier of K-1.

== Rules ==
Krush shares the same rule-set as K-1, which is as follows:

- The fights are contested in a ring which is six or more square meters and surrounded by four ropes.
- Only striking techniques such as punches, kicks and knees are allowed. Strikes with the back of the fist are allowed, but not with the elbow or the forearm. Multiple clinch knees are prohibited.
- Sweeps, throws, headbutts and strikes with the elbow are prohibited. Furthermore, spitting, biting, groin strikes, strikes to the back of the head, striking after the round has ended or the referee has called for a break, striking while the opponent is knocked down and excessive holding are all considered fouls.
- Matches, both regular and title matches, are contested in three three minute rounds. In case of a draw, an extension round is fought.
- Matches are scored based on four criteria:
  - (1) Number of knockdowns a fighter has scored, with three knockdowns inside of a single round resulting in a technical knockout
  - (2) Presence or absence of damage to the opponent
  - (3) The number clean strikes, with strikes which are thrown with fight ending intention scoring more highly than those thrown with the intent of racking up points
  - (4) Aggressiveness

== Events ==
#	Event	Date	Venue	Location
32	Krush 13	November 12, 2011	Korakuen Hall	Tokyo, Japan
31	Krush Youth GP 2011 Opening Round 2	October 10, 2011	Shinjuku Face	Tokyo, Japan
30	Krush Youth GP 2011 Opening Round 1	October 10, 2011	Shinjuku Face	Tokyo, Japan
29	Krush 12	September 24, 2011	Korakuen Hall	Tokyo, Japan
28	Krush 11	August 14, 2011	Korakuen Hall	Tokyo, Japan
27	Krush-Ex 2011 Vol.3	June 12, 2011	Shinjuku Face	Tokyo, Japan
26	K-1 World GP 2015 ~ 1st 70kg Championship Tournament Opening Round ~	May 29, 2011	Korakuen Hall	Tokyo, Japan|-
25	Krush 1st Championship Tournament ~ Triple Final Round ~	April 30, 2011	Korakuen Hall	Tokyo, Japan
24	Krush-Ex 2011 Vol.2	February 13, 2011	Shinjuku Face	Tokyo, Japan
23	Krush-Ex 2011 Vol.1	February 13, 2011	Shinjuku Face	Tokyo, Japan
22	Krush 1st Championship Tournament ～Round 2～	January 9, 2011	Korakuen Hall	Tokyo, Japan
21	Krush 1st Championship Tournament ～Round 1～	December 12, 2010	Korakuen Hall	Tokyo, Japan
20	Krush-Ex ～Road to the Championship～	October 31, 2010	Shinjuku Face	Tokyo, Japan
19	Krush 10	September 20, 2010	Korakuen Hall	Tokyo, Japan
18	Krush 9	August 14, 2010	Korakuen Hall	Tokyo, Japan
17	Krush 8	July 9, 2010	Korakuen Hall	Tokyo, Japan
16	Krush-Ex 2010 Vol.2	June 12, 2010	Shinjuku Face	Tokyo, Japan
15	Krush 7	May 27, 2010	Korakuen Hall	Tokyo, Japan
14	Krush 6	April 29, 2010	Korakuen Hall	Tokyo, Japan
13	KrushxSurvivor	March 13, 2010	Korakuen Hall	Tokyo, Japan
12	Krush-Ex 2010 Vol.1	February 19, 2010	Shinjuku Face	Tokyo, Japan
11	Krush 5	January 4, 2010	Koruaken Hall	Tokyo, Japan
10	Krush-Ex 2009 Vol.2	December 4, 2009	Shinjuku Face	Tokyo, Japan
9	Krush Lightweight Grand Prix 2009 ～Final Round～	November 2, 2009	Koruaken Hall	Tokyo, Japan
8	Krush-Ex 2009 Vol.1	October 12, 2009	Shinjuku Face	Tokyo, Japan
7	Krush 4	September 22, 2009	Korakuen Hall	Tokyo, Japan
6	Krush Lightweight Grand Prix 2009 ～Opening Round.2～	August 14, 2009	Korakuen Hall	Tokyo, Japan
5	Krush Lightweight Grand Prix 2009 ～Opening Round.1～	July 24, 2009	Korakuen Hall	Tokyo, Japan
4	Krush 3	May 17, 2009	Korakuen Hall	Tokyo, Japan
3	Krush 2	March 14, 2009	Korakuen Hall	Tokyo, Japan
2	Krush! Rookies Cup	February 1, 2009	Shinjuku Face	Tokyo, Japan
1	Krush 1: Kickboxing Destruction	November 8, 2008	Korakuen Hall	Tokyo, Japan

== See also ==
- K-1
- List of Krush champions
- List of K-1 champions
- List of kickboxing organizations
