= Sergio Wielzen =

Surinamese-Dutch Muay Thai kickboxer

- Born: November 1, 1987 (age 38); Suriname
- Other names: Samurai
- Height: 1.70 m (5 ft 7 in)
- Weight: 61 kg (134 lb; 9.6 st)
- Division: Super Lightweight; Lightweight; Flyweight (ONE FC)
- Style: Muay Thai (Muay Femur / Muay Mat), Kickboxing
- Fighting out of: Amsterdam, Netherlands
- Trainer: Paul Pengel, Vincent Pengel; Lucien Carbin (former)

Kickboxing record
- Total: 83
- Wins: 60
- By knockout: 24
- Losses: 20
- By knockout: 8
- Draws: 2
- No contests: 1

Other information
- Website: www.sergiowielzen.com
- Last updated on: July 26, 2016

Sergio Wielzen (born November 1, 1987) is a Surinamese-Dutch Muay Thai kickboxer. His nickname is "Samurai". He was the (first ever) It's Showtime 61MAX world champion as well as the Lion Fight Muay Thai world lightweight champion. Despite his deceptively small stature he is known for his explosive power - having won many of his fights by knockout.

== Biography and career ==
Born in Suriname, Wielzen moved to the Netherlands where he became involved in the Dutch national Muay Thai scene beginning his career at C-Class. An explosive fighter despite his short stature, Wielzen worked his way up through the ranks finishing many of his opponents and was becoming noticed as one of the top young prospects at -61 kg in the Netherlands. In 2007 he met fellow up and coming fighter, Mohammed 'Mootje' Kamal, coming out on top in what would be the biggest victory in his career up to that point, winning by decision after five rounds in their B-Class clash. The two would meet again in a re-match the following year, this time at A-Class level. Although Wielzen suffered a TKO defeat, he also proved that he had an excellent chin fighting against a great boxer, puncher before Wielzen didn't came out of his corner in the fourth.

Wielzen would truly emerge on the international scene in 2010 when he faced Thai legend Anuwat Kaewsamrit in Geneva, Switzerland. In a match he was considered a clear underdog, Wielzen shocked the Muay Thai world by knocking out the 'Iron Hands of Siam' via a vicious head kick after just 30 seconds. Due to his results on the local scene – including winning the U.M.C. Contender title against Imed Boukouayel - Wielzen would become involved with the It's Showtime organization, making his debut in Milan and defeating local fighter Matteo Lippi by knockout.

Towards the end of 2010, Wielzen was called up to face Frenchman Mikael Peynaud for the first ever It's Showtime 61MAX world title. The fight had some controversy as the match was stopped in the second round after a clash of heads left Peynaud with a cut. Unable to continue, the fight went to the judge's scorecard, resulting in a technical decision victory for the Surinamese fighter in his home town of Amsterdam. In December of that year, Wielzen was back in action, defending his world title after two months against Japanese K-1 fighter Masahiro Yamamoto in Athens. This title fight was much more clear cut than the first with Wielzen winning by TKO in what was a commanding performance. In March 2011, Wielzen defended his It's Showtime world title once again but was unable to retain his crown, losing by majority decision after five rounds to Karim Bennoui at the event in Brussels.

He lost to Emerson Falcao via unanimous decision at It's Showtime 60 in São Paulo, Brazil on November 10, 2012.

Wielzen got his first win of the year when he knocked out Saša Jovanović in round one at Vendetta VI in Vienna, Austria on December 8, 2012.

He knocked out Alexei Blinov in the first round at Era of Champions in Cheboksary, Russia on March 14, 2013.

He lost a wide unanimous decision to former Lumpinee Stadium champion Kaoponlek after being floored in round one at Glory 7: Milan in Milan, Italy on April 20, 2013.

Wielzen rematched Masahiro Yamamoto at RISE 94 in Tokyo, Japan on July 20, 2013, and fell victim to a second round high kick from the Japanese fighter.

Wielzen competed at the -65 kg/143 lb Thai Max tournament in Meyreul, France on October 19, 2013, defeating Mickael Peynaud by first-round KO in the quarter-finals before losing to Houcine Bennoui by unanimous decision in the semis.

== Titles ==
- 2016 Lion Fight Lightweight Champion
- 2014 W5 World Champion -60 kg
- 2011 W5 World Champion -60 kg
- 2010-11 It's Showtime World Champion -61 kg (1 title defence)
- 2010 U.M.C. Contender title -61.23 kg

== Kickboxing record ==
Kickboxing Record
60 Wins (24 (T)KO's), 20 Losses, 2 Draws, 1 No Contest
Date	Result	Opponent	Event	Location	Method	Round	Time
2018-09-22	Loss	(Thailand) Rodtang Jitmuangnon	ONE Championship: Conquest of Heroes	Jakarta, Indonesia	Decision (Unanimous)	3	3:00
2018-05-18	Loss	(Thailand) Sam-A Gaiyanghadao	ONE Championship: Unstoppable Dreams	Kallang, Singapore	KO (Right Elbow)	4	2:47
Fight was for One Championship Muaythai Flyweight Title.
2017-02-18	Loss	(Russia) Timur Nadrov	W5 Grand Prix KITEK XXXIX	Moscow, Russia	TKO (Referee Stoppage/Right Hook)	2	
Fight was for W5 -60 kg Tournament for W5 World Title
2017-01-13	Win	(China) Li Ning	Glory of Heroes 6	Jiyuan, Henan, China	Decision (Unanimous)	3	3:00
2016-12-03	Loss	(China) Wang Wenfeng	Mix Fight Gala 20	Germany	Decision	3	3:00
2016-10-29	Loss	(Spain) Daniel Puertas Gallardo	Wu Lin Feng x KO Fighters 2	Marbella, Spain	Ext.R Decision	4	3:00
For the inaugural Wu Lin Feng -60kg World title.
2016-07-23	Win	(Mongolia) Ba Gei	FF Fighting Championship	Shenzhen, China	KO	2	1:25
2016-07-09	Win	(France) Arthur Meyer	Lion Fight 30	Mashantucket, Connecticut, United States	Decision (split)	5	3:00
2016-05-07	Loss	(China) Yun Qi	Glory of Heroes 2	Shenzhen, China	Decision	3	3:00
2016-02-27	Win	(United States) Ognjen Topic	Lion Fight 28	Mashantucket, Connecticut, United States	TKO (doctor stoppage)	3	0:50
Wins Lion Fight Lightweight World Championship
2015-10-24	Win	(China) Kong Long	KF1 WLF Intercontinental Super-4 Final	Hong Kong	KO	2	
Wins KF1 WLF Intercontinental Super-4 (-61.5kg)
2015-10-24	Win	(Hong Kong) Chin Ngai Chung	KF1 WLF Intercontinental Super-4 Semi-final	Hong Kong	KO	1	
2015-09-27	Loss	(Russia) Yakub Bersanukayev	ACB KB 2: Grand Prix Semifinals	Vityazevo, Krasnodar Krai, Russia	Decision (unanimous)	3	3:00
2015-07-04	Win	(China) Jin Ying		China	KO	2	
2015-04-04	Loss	(China) Deng Zeqi	Wu Lin Feng	China	TKO (doctor stoppage)	2	1:38
2014-11-29	Win	(Ukraine) Vitaly Lisnyak	W5 Crossroad of Times, Semi Finals	Bratislava, Slovakia	Decision	3	3:00
Wins W5 -60 kg Tournament for W5 World Championship
2014-11-29	Win	(Thailand) Kittipong Pongthong	W5 Crossroad of Times, Semi Finals	Bratislava, Slovakia	Decision	3	3:00
2014-05-10	Loss	(France) Charles François	King of the Ring 3	Longeville-Lès-Metz, France	Decision	3	3:00
2014-01-25	Loss	(Morocco) Hamza Essalih	Enfusion Fighting Rookies	Antwerp, Belgium	Ext.R Decision	4	3:00
2013-10-19	Loss	(France) Houcine Bennoui	Thai Max, Semi Finals	Meyreuil, France	Decision (unanimous)	3	3:00
2013-10-19	Win	(France) Mickael Peynaud	Thai Max, Quarter Finals	Meyreuil, France	KO	1	
2013-07-20	Loss	(Japan) Masahiro Yamamoto	RISE 94	Tokyo, Japan	KO (left high kick)	2	1:36
2013-04-20	Loss	(Thailand) Sak Kaoponlek	Glory 7: Milan	Milan, Italy	Decision (unanimous)	3	3:00
2013-03-14	Win	(Russia) Alexei Blinov	Era of Champions	Cheboksary, Chuvashia, Russia	KO	1	
2012-12-08	Win	(Austria) Saša Jovanović	Vendetta VI	Vienna, Austria	KO (left hook)	1	
2012-11-10	Loss	(Brazil) Emerson Falcão	It's Showtime 60	São Paulo, Brazil	Decision (unanimous)	3	3:00
2012-08-19	Loss	(Thailand) Saeksan Or. Kwanmuang	Muay Thai Warriors	China	KO (elbow)	3	
Fight Was For Muay Thai Warriors 136lbs. vacant belt.
2011-11-23	Loss	(Japan) Kosuke Komiyama	RISE 85	Tokyo, Japan	TKO (Cut)	1	2:08
2011-11-12	Win	(Spain) Carlos Reyes	Street Culture, Fight Club Group & Canary Kickboxing Federation presents: It’s Showtime 53	Tenerife, Spain	TKO (Cut)	1	
2011-10-22	Win	(Russia) Ruslan Tozliyan	W5 Grand Prix Moscow	Moscow, Russia	Decision (Unanimous)	5	3:00
Wins W5 world title (-60 kg).
2011-03-26	Loss	(France) Karim Bennoui	BFN Group presents: It's Showtime Brussels	Brussels, Belgium	Decision (Split)	5	3:00
Loses It's Showtime 61MAX world title -61 kg.
2010-12-11	Win	(Japan) Masahiro Yamamoto	Yiannis Evgenikos presents: It’s Showtime Athens	Athens, Greece	TKO (Doctor Stoppage)	3	
Retains It's Showtime 61MAX world title -61 kg (1st defence).
2010-09-12	Win	(France) Mikael Peynaud	Fightingstars presents: It's Showtime 2010	Amsterdam, Netherlands	Technical Decision (5-0)	2	
Wins inaugural It's Showtime 61MAX world title -61 kg.
2010-05-29	Win	(Thailand) Anuwat Kaewsamrit	Muaythai event in Geneva	Geneva, Switzerland	KO (Right High Kick)	1	0:30
2010-03-13	Win	(Italy) Matteo Lippi	Oktagon presents: It's Showtime 2010	Milan, Italy	KO	3	
2010-01-24	Win	(Netherlands) Imed Boukouayel	Beatdown	Amsterdam, Netherlands	TKO	3	
Wins U.M.C. Contender title -61.23 kg.
2009-11-21	Win	(Northern Ireland) Gary Hamilton	It's Showtime 2009 Barneveld	Barneveld, Netherlands	Decision	3	3:00
2009-10-04	Loss	(Netherlands) Delon Carilo	Ring Rage III	Groningen, Netherlands	Decision	5	3:00
2009-03-08	Win	(Morocco) Mohammed Ettajiri	Beatdown	Amsterdam, Netherlands	KO (Knee)	1	
2009-02-01	Win	(Morocco) Rachid El Majoubi	Time For Action	Nijmegen, Netherlands	TKO (Doctor Stoppage)	1	
2008-11-08	Loss	(Morocco) Mohammed Khamal	Ice Cold Assassins	Amsterdam, Netherlands	TKO	4	
2008-05-31	Loss	(Netherlands) Delon Carrilho	Enriching Suriname	Paramaribo, Suriname	Decision	5	3:00
2008-02-02	Draw	(Netherlands) Mo Aljedyan	Beatdown IX, Zonnehuis	Amsterdam, Netherlands	Decision draw	5	2:00
2007-11-03	Win	(Morocco) Mohammed Khamal	Beatdown VIII	Amsterdam, Netherlands	Decision (Unanimous)	5	2:00
2007-07-21	Win	(Aruba) Stacy Hassell	Surinam Be Innovative	Suriname	KO	2	
2007-05-12	Win	(Morocco) Bilal Aoulad Si Oomar	Muaythai Gala "Talents of Osdorp", Sporthal Ookmeer	Amsterdam, Netherlands	Decision (Unanimous)	5	2:00
2007-04-29	NC	(Morocco) Mimoun Boughdir	Beatdown V, Wethouder Verheijhal Sporthal	Amsterdam, Netherlands	No contest	1	
2007-03-31	Win	(Belgium) Suleyman Kasmi		Middelburg, Netherlands	TKO (Referee stoppage)	3	
2007-03-18	Win	(Netherlands) Dennis Leeman	Dangerzone, Zonnehuis	Amsterdam, Netherlands	KO (Right cross)	1	
2007-02-24	Win	(Morocco) Illias Chabrani Gym	Dodi Sports "Fight4Life"	Amsterdam, Netherlands	Decision (Unanimous)	3	2:00
2007-02-10	Win	(Morocco) Mohamed Ayder	Beatdown IV	Amsterdam, Netherlands	Decision	3	2:00
2006-10-15	Win	(Netherlands) Joop Snijders	Top Team Beverwijk Muay thai gala	Beverwijk, Netherlands	Decision (Unanimous)	3	2:00
2006-06-24	Loss	(Turkey) Yetkin Özkul	Kickbox gala Deventer	Deventer, Netherlands	TKO (Doctor stoppage)		
2006-03-18	Draw	(Morocco) Bilal Fiomar	Beatdown	Amsterdam, Netherlands	Decision draw	3	2:00
2005-10-29	Win	(Netherlands) Leroy de Veth	Kickboxgala Zonnehuis	Amsterdam, Netherlands	Decision	3	2:00
2003-12-12	Win	(Netherlands) Stanley Witteling	Team Karakura Muaythai & Freefight Gala	Katwijk, Netherlands	Decision	2	2:00
Legend: Win Loss Draw/No contest Notes

== See also ==
- List of It's Showtime events
- List of It's Showtime champions
- List of male kickboxers
- List of male mixed martial artists
