= 2016 in K-1 =

Mixed martial arts events

Information
- First date: March 4

Events

Fights

Chronology
| 2015 in K-1 | 2016 in K-1 | 2017 in K-1 |

The year 2016 is the 24th year in the history of the K-1.

== List of events ==
| # | Event Title | Date | Arena | Location |
|---|---|---|---|---|
| 1 | K-1 World GP 2016 -65kg Japan Tournament | March 4, 2016 | Yoyogi National Gymnasium | Tokyo, Japan |
| 2 | K-1 World GP 2016 -60kg Japan Tournament | April 24, 2016 | Yoyogi National Gymnasium | Tokyo, Japan |
| 3 | K-1 World GP 2016 -65kg World Tournament | June 24, 2016 | Yoyogi National Gymnasium | Tokyo, Japan |
| 4 | K-1 World GP 2016 Super Featherweight World Tournament | September 19, 2016 | Yoyogi National Gymnasium | Tokyo, Japan |
| 5 | K-1 World GP 2016 Euro -95kg Tournament | October 27, 2016 | Crowne Plaza Belgrade | Belgrade, Serbia |
| 6 | K-1 World GP 2016 Featherweight Championship Tournament | November 3, 2016 | Yoyogi National Gymnasium | Tokyo, Japan |
| 7 | K-1 World GP 2016 Euro -85kg Tournament | December 3, 2016 | SKPC Mejdan | Tuzla, Bosnia and Herzegovina |

== K-1 World GP 2016 -65kg Japan Tournament ==
K-1 World GP 2016 -65kg Japan Tournament
- Promotion: K-1
- Date: March 4, 2016
- Venue: Yoyogi National Gymnasium
- City: Tokyo, Japan

Event chronology
| K-1 World GP 2015 The Championship | K-1 World GP 2016 -65kg Japan Tournament | K-1 World GP 2016 -60kg Japan Tournament |

K-1 World GP 2016 -65kg Japan Tournament was a kickboxing event held on March 4, 2016 at the Yoyogi National Gymnasium in Tokyo, Japan.

=== Results ===
Main Card
| Weight Class | | | | Method | Round | Time | Notes |
|---|---|---|---|---|---|---|---|
| 65kg | (Japan) Hideaki Yamazaki | def. | (Japan) Masaaki Noiri | Decision (majority) | 3 | 3:00 | -65kg Tournament Final |
| 65kg | (Thailand) Kaew Fairtex | def. | (Netherlands) Massaro Glunder | Decision (majority) | 3 | 3:00 |
| 60kg | (Germany) Johannes Wolf | def. | (Japan) Hirotaka Urabe | Decision (majority) | 3 | 3:00 |
| 65kg | (Japan) Hideaki Yamazaki | def. | (Japan) Yuta Kubo | KO | 3 | 2:57 | -65kg Tournament Semi Final |
| 65kg | (Japan) Masaaki Noiri | def. | (Japan) Hiroya | Decision (majority) | 3 | 3:00 | -65kg Tournament Semi Final |
| Heavyweight | (Japan) Makoto Uehara | def. | (Japan) Nori | KO | 1 | 2:06 |
| 70kg | (Japan) Yu Hirono | def. | (Japan) Kotetsu | Decision (unanimous) | 3 | 3:00 |
| 65kg | (Japan) Yuta Kubo | def. | (Japan) Noman | Decision (unanimous) | 3 | 3:00 | -65kg Tournament Quarter Final |
| 65kg | (Japan) Hideaki Yamazaki | def. | (Japan) Yasuomi Soda | KO | 2 | 0:32 | -65kg Tournament Quarter Final |
| 65kg | (Japan) Hiroya | def. | (Japan) Naoki Terasaki | KO | 1 | 2:19 | -65kg Tournament Quarter Final |
| 65kg | (Japan) Masaaki Noiri | def. | (Brazil) Minoru Kimura | KO | 1 | 2:54 | -65kg Tournament Quarter Final |
| 65kg | (Japan) Kohei Nishikawa | def. | (Japan) Daiki Yoshinuma | Extra round decision (unanimous) | 4 | 3:00 | -65kg Tournament Reserve Fight |
Preliminary Card
| 70kg | (Japan) Katsuya Jinbo | def. | (Japan) Go-Oh | KO | 3 | 1:40 |
| 65kg | (Japan) Mitsuhara Waki | draw | (Japan) Daiki Matsushita | Decision (majority) | 3 | 3:00 |
| 55kg | (Japan) Yuki Egawa | def. | (Japan) Reiji Kasami | Decision (unanimous) | 3 | 3:00 |

=== K-1 World GP 2016 -65kg Japan Tournament bracket ===
Quarter-finals
(Japan) Masaaki Noiri | KO
(Brazil) Minoru Kimura | 1R.
(Japan) Naoki Terashima | 1R.
(Japan) Hiroya | KO
(Japan) Yasuomi Soda | 2R.
(Japan) Hideaki Yamazaki | KO
(Japan) Yuta Kubo | DEC
(Japan) Noman | 3-0

Semi-finals
(Japan) Masaaki Noiri | DEC
(Japan) Hiroya | 2-0
(Japan) Hideaki Yamazaki | KO
(Japan) Yuta Kubo | 3R.

Final
(Japan) Masaaki Noiri | 2-0
(Japan) Hideaki Yamazaki | DEC

== K-1 World GP 2016 -60kg Japan Tournament ==
K-1 World GP 2016 -60kg Japan Tournament
- Promotion: K-1
- Date: April 24, 2016
- Venue: Yoyogi National Gymnasium
- City: Tokyo, Japan

Event chronology
| K-1 World GP 2016 -65kg Japan Tournament | K-1 World GP 2016 -60kg Japan Tournament | K-1 World GP 2016 -65kg World Tournament |

K-1 World GP 2016 -60kg Japan Tournament was a kickboxing event held on April 24, 2016 at the Yoyogi National Gymnasium in Tokyo, Japan.

=== Results ===
Main Card
| Weight Class | | | | Method | Round | Time | Notes |
|---|---|---|---|---|---|---|---|
| 60kg | (Japan) Taiga | def. | (Japan) Koya Urabe | Decision (unanimous) | 3 | 3:00 | -60kg Tournament Final |
| 56kg | (Japan) Takeru Segawa | def. | (Thailand) Yoadsenchai Sor. Sopit | TKO | 3 | 0:48 |
| 65kg | (Thailand) Kaew Fairtex | def. | (Morocco) Ilias Bulaid | Decision (unanimous) | 3 | 3:00 |
| 60kg | (Brazil) Paulo Tebar | def. | (Japan) Hirotaka Urabe | Decision (majority) | 3 | 3:00 |
| 60kg | (Japan) Koya Urabe | def. | (Japan) Kotaro Shimano | KO | 2 | 0:51 | -60kg Tournament Semi Final |
| 60kg | (Japan) Taiga | def. | (Japan) Toshi | KO | 1 | 0:54 | -60kg Tournament Semi Final |
| 70kg | (Japan) Yoichi Yamazaki | def. | (Japan) Daiki Watabe | Decision (unanimous) | 3 | 3:00 |
| 70kg | (Japan) Kazuya Akimoto | def. | (Japan) Shintaro Matsukura | Decision (majority) | 3 | 3:00 |
| 60kg | (Japan) Koya Urabe | def. | (Japan) Kouzi | Decision (unanimous) | 3 | 3:00 | -60kg Tournament Quarter Final |
| 60kg | (Japan) Kotaro Shimano | def. | (Japan) Hitoshi Aketo | KO | 1 | 2:55 | -60kg Tournament Quarter Final |
| 60kg | (Japan) Toshi | def. | (Japan) Leona Pettas | Decision (unanimous) | 3 | 3:00 | -60kg Tournament Quarter Final |
| 60kg | (Japan) Taiga | def. | (Japan) Masahiro Yamamoto | KO | 1 | 1:47 | -60kg Tournament Quarter Final |
| 60kg | (Japan) Shota Kanbe | def. | (Japan) Masanobu Goshu | Extra round decision (split) | 4 | 3:00 | -60kg Tournament Reserve Fight |
Preliminary Card
| Weight Class | | | | Method | Round | Time | Notes |
| 65kg | (Japan) Yuto Shinohara | def. | (Japan) Yuki Koge | KO | 2 | 1:13 |
| 70kg | (Japan) Tomoaki Makino | def. | (Japan) Masato Uchiyama | Decision (majority) | 3 | 3:00 |
| 60kg | (Japan) Takuma Kawaguchi | def. | (Japan) Naoki Yamamoto | Decision (majority) | 3 | 3:00 |

=== K-1 World GP 2016 -60kg Japan Tournament bracket ===
Quarter-finals
(Japan) Masahiro Yamamoto | 1R.
(Japan) Taiga | KO
(Japan) Leona Pettas | 3-0
(Japan) Toshi | DEC
(Japan) Shimano Kotaro | KO
(Japan) Hitoshi Aketo | 1R.
(Japan) Koya Urabe | DEC
(Japan) Kouzi (kickboxer) | 3-0

Semi-finals
(Japan) Taiga | KO
(Japan) Toshi | 1R.
(Japan) Shimano Kotaro | 2R.
(Japan) Koya Urabe | KO

Final
(Japan) Taiga | DEC
(Japan) Koya Urabe | 3-0

== K-1 World GP 2016 -65kg World Tournament ==
K-1 World GP 2016 -65kg World Tournament
- Promotion: K-1
- Date: June 24, 2016
- Venue: Yoyogi National Gymnasium
- City: Tokyo, Japan

Event chronology
| K-1 World GP 2016 -60kg Japan Tournament | K-1 World GP 2016 -65kg World Tournament | K-1 World GP 2016 Super Featherweight World Tournament |

K-1 World GP 2016 -65kg World Tournament was a kickboxing event held on June 24, 2016 at the Yoyogi National Gymnasium in Tokyo, Japan.

=== Results ===
Main Card
| Weight Class | | | | Method | Round | Time | Notes |
|---|---|---|---|---|---|---|---|
| 65kg | (Thailand) Kaew Fairtex | def. | (Morocco) Ilias Bulaid | KO | 2 | 2:25 | -65kg Tournament Final |
| 57kg | (Japan) Takeru Segawa | def. | (Japan) Kaito Ozawa | Decision (unanimous) | 3 | 3:00 |
| 70kg | (Japan) Yasuhiro Kido | def. | (Japan) Daiki Watabe | Deicion (unanimous) | 3 | 3:00 |
| 65kg | (Thailand) Kaew Fairtex | def. | (Japan) Masaaki Noiri | Decision (unanimous) | 3 | 3:00 | -65kg Tournament Semi Final |
| 65kg | (Morocco) Ilias Bulaid | def. | (Japan) Hideaki Yamazaki | Extra round decision (split) | 4 | 3:00 | -65kg Tournament Semi Final |
| 60kg | (China) Yun Qi | def. | (Japan) Kosuke Komiyama | Decision (majority) | 3 | 3:00 |
| Heavyweight | (Japan) Makoto Uehara | def. | (Japan) Tsutomu Takahagi | TKO | 1 | 0:32 |
| 65kg | (Thailand) Kaew Fairtex | def. | (Japan) Hiroya | KO | 1 | 0:36 | -65kg Tournament Quarter Final |
| 65kg | (Japan) Masaaki Noiri | def. | (Netherlands) Massaro Glunder | Decision (unanimous) | 3 | 3:00 | -65kg Tournament Quarter Final |
| 65kg | (Morocco) Ilias Bulaid | def. | (United States) Chris Mauceri | KO | 2 | 0:50 | -65kg Tournament Quarter Final |
| 65kg | (Japan) Hideaki Yamazaki | def. | (Moldova) Stanislav Renita | Decision (unanimous) | 3 | 3:00 | -65kg Tournament Quarter Final |
| 65kg | (Brazil) Minoru Kimura | def. | (Japan) Noman | Decision (unanimous) | 3 | 3:00 | -65kg Tournament Reserve Fight |
Preliminary Card
| Weight Class | | | | Method | Round | Time | Notes |
| 65kg | (Japan) Haruma Saikyo | def. | (Japan) Taio Asahisa | Decision (majority) | 3 | 3:00 |
| Heavyweight | (Japan) Keiji | def. | (Japan) Hitoshi Sugimoto | Decision (unanimous) | 3 | 3:00 |
| 65kg | (Japan) Mitsuhara Waki | def. | (Japan) Seiya Ueda | Decision (unanimous) | 3 | 3:00 |

=== K-1 World GP 2016 -65kg World Tournament bracket ===
Quarter-finals
(Japan) Hideaki Yamazaki | DEC
(Moldova) Stanislav Renita | 3-0
(Morocco) Ilias Bulaid | KO
(United States) Chris Mauceri | 2R.
(Netherlands) Massaro Glunder | 3-0
(Japan) Masaaki Noiri | DEC
(Thailand) Kaew Fairtex | KO
(Japan) Hiroya | 1R.

Semi-finals
(Japan) Hideaki Yamazaki | 2-1
(Morocco) Ilias Bulaid | 4R.
(Japan) Masaaki Noiri | 3-0
(Thailand) Kaew Fairtex | DEC

Final
(Morocco) Ilias Bulaid | 2R.
(Thailand) Kaew Fairtex | KO

== K-1 World GP 2016 Super Featherweight World Tournament ==
K-1 World GP 2016 Super Featherweight World Tournament
- Promotion: K-1
- Date: September 19, 2016
- Venue: Yoyogi National Gymnasium
- City: Tokyo, Japan

Event chronology
| K-1 World GP 2016 -65kg World Tournament | K-1 World GP 2016; Super Featherweight; World Tournament | K-1 World GP 2016 -95kg Championship Tournament |

K-1 World GP 2016 Super Featherweight World Tournament was a kickboxing event held on September 19, 2016 at the Yoyogi National Gymnasium in Tokyo, Japan.

=== Fight Card ===
Main Card
| Weight Class | | | | Method | Round | Time | Notes |
|---|---|---|---|---|---|---|---|
| Super Featherweight | (Japan) Koya Urabe | def. | (Japan) Taiga | TKO (3 Knockdowns) | 1 | 1:31 | Super Featherweight Tournament Final |
| Super Lightweight | (Thailand) Kongnapa Weerasakreck | def. | (Japan) Hideaki Yamazaki | Decision (unanimous) | 3 | 3:00 |
| Heavyweight | (Japan) Makoto Uehara | def. | (Japan) Koichi | Decision (unanimous) | 3 | 3:00 |
| Lightweight | (Japan) Kenta Hayashi | def. | (Japan) Yuji Takeuchi | KO (3 Knockdowns) | 1 | 2:47 |
| Super Featherweight | (Japan) Koya Urabe | def. | (Brazil) Paulo Tebar | KO (Punches) | 2 | 0:58 | Super Featherweight Tournament Semi Final |
| Super Featherweight | (Japan) Taiga | def. | (Japan) Hirotaka Urabe | Decision (unanimous) | 3 | 3:00 | Super Featherweight Tournament Semi Final |
| 65kg | (Japan) Kazuma Mori | def. | (China) Hong Jingyao | KO | 3 | 0:27 | K-1 College 2016 -65kg Final |
| 60kg | (Japan) Kosuke Morii | def. | (Japan) Michitaka Uchida | Decision (majority) | 3 | 2:00 | K-1 College 2016 -60kg Final |
| 55kg | (Japan) Yuta Kuwata | def. | (Japan) Yu Nomura | KO | 3 | 1:22 | K-1 College 2016 -55kg Final |
| Super Featherweight | (Japan) Kosuke Komiyama | def. | (Brazil) Paulo Tebar | Decision (unanimous) | 3 | 3:00 | Super Featherweight Tournament Quarter Final |
| Super Featherweight | (Japan) Koya Urabe | def. | (Algeria) Karim Bennoui | Decision (unanimous) | 3 | 3:00 | Super Featherweight Tournament Quarter Final |
| Super Featherweight | (Japan) Hirotaka Urabe | def. | (Germany) Johannes Wolf | Decision (unanimous) | 3 | 3:00 | Super Featherweight Tournament Quarter Final |
| Super Featherweight | (Japan) Taiga | def. | (Spain) Javier Hernández | TKO (retirement) | 2 | 3:00 | Super Featherweight Tournament Quarter Final |
| Super Featherweight | (Japan) Kouzi | def. | (Japan) Toshi | Decision (unanimous) | 3 | 3:00 | Super Featherweight Tournament Reserve Fight |
Preliminary Card
| Weight Class | | | | Method | Round | Time | Notes |
| Super Featherweight | (Japan) Masanobu Goshu | def. | (Japan) Yuta Takahashi | Decision (majority) | 3 | 3:00 |
| Heavyweight | (Japan) K-Jee | def. | (Japan) Yoshinari | KO | 2 | 1:23 |
| Featherweight | (Japan) Kento Ito | draw | (Japan) Ryusei Ashizawa | Decision (majority) | 3 | 3:00 |

=== K-1 World GP 2016 Super Featherweight World Tournament bracket ===
Quarter-finals
(Japan) Taiga | TKO
(Spain) Javier Hernández | 2R
(Japan) Hirotaka Urabe | DEC
(Germany) Johannes Wolf | 3-0
(Japan) Koya Urabe | DEC
(Algeria) Karim Bennoui | 3-0
(Japan) Kosuke Komiyama | DEC
(Brazil) Paulo Tebar | 3-0

Semi-finals
(Japan) Taiga | DEC
(Japan) Hirotaka Urabe | 3-0
(Japan) Koya Urabe | KO
(Brazil) Paulo Tebar^{1} | 2R

Final
(Japan) Taiga | 1R
(Japan) Koya Urabe | KO

^{1} Komiyama injured, so Tebar advanced.

== K-1 World GP 2016 Euro -95kg Tournament ==
K-1 World GP 2016 Euro -95kg Tournament
- Promotion: K-1
- Date: October 27, 2016
- Venue: Crowne Plaza Belgrade
- City: Belgrade, Serbia

K-1 World GP 2016 Euro -95kg Tournament was a kickboxing event held on October 27, 2016 at the Crowne Plaza Belgrade in Belgrade, Serbia.

=== Fight Card ===
Main Card
| Weight Class | | | | Method | Round | Time | Notes |
|---|---|---|---|---|---|---|---|
| 95kg | (Ukraine) Roman Kryklia | def. | (Netherlands) Fabio Kwasi | KO (Knee) | 3 | | 95kg Europe Tournament Final |
| 95kg | (Netherlands) Fabio Kwasi | def. | (Serbia) Rade Opačić | Decision (Unanimous) | 3 | 3:00 | 95kg Europe Tournament Semi Final |
| 95kg | (Ukraine) Roman Kryklia | def. | (Germany) Atha Kasapis | KO (Knee) | 3 | | 95kg Europe Tournament Semi Final |
| 95kg | (Netherlands) Fabio Kwasi | def. | (Croatia) Mladen Kujundžić | Decision (Unanimous) | 3 | 3:00 | 95kg Europe Tournament Quarter Final |
| 95kg | (Serbia) Rade Opačić | def. | (France) Emmanuel Payet | Decision (Unanimous) | 3 | 3:00 | 95kg Europe Tournament Quarter Final |
| 95kg | (Germany) Atha Kasapis | def. | (United Kingdom) Aundre Groce | TKO (Right hook) | 1 | | 95kg Europe Tournament Quarter Final |
| 95kg | (Ukraine) Roman Kryklia | def. | (Bosnia and Herzegovina) Bahrudin Mahmić | KO (Knee to the head) | 1 | 2:33 | 95kg Europe Tournament Quarter Final |
| 95kg | (Czech Republic) Vasil Ducar | def. | (Greece) Panagiotis Theodosiadis | Decision | 3 | 3:00 | 95kg Europe Tournament Reserve fight |
Preliminary Card
| 60kg | (Serbia) Marina Spasić | def. | (Bosnia and Herzegovina) Merima Basić | Decision | 3 | 3:00 | |
| 71kg | (Russia) Sayfullah Hambahadov | def. | (Serbia) Marko Adamović | Decision | 3 | 3:00 | |

=== K-1 World GP 2016 Euro -95kg Tournament bracket ===
Quarter-finals
(Ukraine) Roman Kryklia | KO
(Bosnia and Herzegovina) Bahrudin Mahmić | 1
(Germany) Atha Kasapis | TKO
(United Kingdom) Aundre Groce | 3
(Serbia) Rade Opačić | DEC
(France) Emmanuel Payet | 3-0
(Netherlands) Fabio Kwasi | DEC
(Croatia) Mladen Kujundžić | 3-0

Semi-finals
(Ukraine) Roman Kryklia | KO
(Germany) Atha Kasapis | 3
(Netherlands) Fabio Kwasi | DEC
(Serbia) Rade Opačić | 3-0

Final
(Ukraine) Roman Kryklia | KO
(Netherlands) Fabio Kwasi | 2

== K-1 World GP 2016 Featherweight World Tournament ==
K-1 World GP 2016 Super Featherweight World Tournament
- Promotion: K-1
- Date: November 3, 2016
- Venue: Yoyogi National Gymnasium
- City: Tokyo, Japan

Event chronology
| K-1 World GP 2016 -60kg World Tournament | K-1 World GP 2016; Super Featherweight; World Tournament | K-1 World GP 2017 |

K-1 World GP 2016 Featherweight World Tournament was a kickboxing event held on November 3, 2016 at the Yoyogi National Gymnasium in Tokyo, Japan.

=== Fight Card ===
Main Card
| Weight Class | | | | Method | Round | Time | Notes |
|---|---|---|---|---|---|---|---|
| Featherweight | (Japan) Takeru | def. | (Japan) Kaito Ozawa | Decision (unanimous) | 3 | 3:00 | Featherweight GP Final |
| Super Welterweight | (Sweden) Sanny Dahlbeck | def. | (Japan) Yasuhiro Kido | KO (Overhand + Left Knee) | 1 | 2:09 | |
| Welterweight | (Japan) Yuta Kubo | def. | (Japan) Keita Makihira | Decision (unanimous) | 3 | 3:00 | |
| Super Lightweight | (Japan) Yasuomi Soda | def. | (Netherlands) Fawad Seddiqi | Decision (unanimous) | 3 | 3:00 | |
| Featherweight | (Japan) Takeru | def. | (China) Yun Qi | TKO (Punches) | 2 | 2:31 | Featherweight GP Semi Final |
| Featherweight | (Japan) Kaito Ozawa | def. | (France) Elias Mahmoudi | Decision (unanimous) | 3 | 3:00 | Featherweight Tournament Semi Final |
| 65kg | (Japan) Kensei Kondo | def. | (Japan) Kai Honma | Decision (unanimous) | 3 | 2:00 | K-1 Koshien 2016 -65kg Final |
| 60kg | (Japan) Yuma Saikyo | def. | (Japan) Takumi Yokoyama | Decision (unanimous) | 3 | 2:00 | K-1 Koshien 2016 -60kg Final |
| 55kg | (Japan) Taito Gunji | def. | (Japan) Tatsuya Tsubakihara | Decision (unanimous) | 3 | 2:00 | K-1 Koshien 2016 -55kg Final |
| Featherweight | (Japan) Takeru | def. | (United Kingdom) Jamie Whelan | Decision (unanimous) | 3 | 3:00 | Featherweight GP Quarter Final |
| Featherweight | (China) Yun Qi | def. | (Japan) Shota Kanbe | Decision (unanimous) | 3 | 1:32 | Featherweight GP Quarter Final |
| Featherweight | (France) Elias Mahmoudi | def. | (Japan) Ryuma Tobe | Decision (unanimous) | 3 | 3:00 | Featherweight GP Quarter Final |
| Featherweight | (Japan) Kaito Ozawa | def. | (Australia) Josh Tonna | KO (Knee to the body) | 1 | 0:57 | Featherweight GP Quarter Final |
| Featherweight | (Japan) Hirotaka Asahisa | def. | (Japan) Yuka Otaki | Decision (unanimous) | 3 | 3:00 | Featherweight GP Reserve Fight |
Preliminary Card
| Weight Class | | | | Method | Round | Time | Notes |
| Lightweight | (Japan) Rukiya Anpo | def. | (Japan) Hisaki Higashimoto | Decision (unanimous) | 3 | 3:00 | |
| Super Lightweight | (Japan) Yuto Shinohara | def. | (Japan) Tatsuya Mineyama | Decision (unanimous) | 3 | 3:00 | |
| Super Bantamweight | (Japan) Yuki Egawa | def. | (Japan) Ryota | KO | 1 | 1:15 | |

=== K-1 World GP 2016 Featherweight World Tournament bracket ===
Quarter-finals
(Japan) Kaito Ozawa | KO
(Australia) Josh Toner | 1R
(Japan) Ryuma Tobe | 3-0
(France) Elias Mahmoudi | DEC
(Japan) Shota Kanbe | DEC
(China) Yun Qi | 3-0
(Japan) Takeru | DEC
(United Kingdom) Jamie Whelan | 3-0

Semi-finals
(Japan) Kaito Ozawa | DEC
(France) Elias Mahmoudi | 3-0
(China) Yun Qi | 2R
(Japan) Takeru | TKO

Final
(Japan) Kaito Ozawa | 3-0
(Japan) Takeru | DEC

== K-1 World GP 2016 Euro -85kg Tournament ==
K-1 World GP 2016 Euro -85kg Tournament
- Promotion: K-1
- Date: December 3, 2016
- Venue: SKPC Mejdan
- City: Tuzla, Bosnia and Herzegovina

K-1 World GP 2016 Euro -85kg Tournament was a kickboxing event held on December 3, 2016 at the SKPC Mejdan in Tuzla, Bosnia and Herzegovina.

=== Fight Card ===
Main Card
| Weight Class | | | | Method | Round | Time | Notes |
|---|---|---|---|---|---|---|---|
| 85kg | (Russia) Timur Aylyarov | def. | (Bosnia and Herzegovina) Igor Emkić | KO (Body shots) | 3 | | 85kg Europe Tournament Final |
| 71kg | (Bosnia and Herzegovina) Haris Biber | def. | (Poland) Rafal Gorka | Decision (Unanimous) | 3 | 3:00 | |
| 70kg | (Greece) Giannis Skordilis | def. | (Brazil) Maycon Oller | Decision (Unanimous) | 3 | 3:00 | |
| 85kg | (Russia) Timur Aylyarov | def. | (Croatia) Agron Preteni | Decision (Unanimous) | 3 | 3:00 | 85kg Europe Tournament Semi Final |
| 85kg | (Bosnia and Herzegovina) Igor Emkić | def. | (France) David Radeff | Decision (Unanimous) | 3 | 3:00 | 85kg Europe Tournament Semi Final |
| 85kg | (France) David Radeff | def. | (Serbia) Nikola Noveski | Decision (Unanimous) | 3 | 3:00 | 85kg Europe Tournament Quarter Final |
| 85kg | (Bosnia and Herzegovina) Igor Emkić | def. | (Italy) Giuseppe De Domenico | Decision (Unanimous) | 3 | 3:00 | 85kg Europe Tournament Quarter Final |
| 85kg | (Croatia) Agron Preteni | def. | (Spain) Imanol Rodriguez | Decision (Unanimous) | 3 | 3:00 | 85kg Europe Tournament Quarter Final |
| 85kg | (Russia) Timur Aylyarov | def. | (Czech Republic) Vasil Ducar | TKO | | | 85kg Europe Tournament Quarter Final |
| 85kg | (Bosnia and Herzegovina) Mesud Selimovic | def. | (Croatia) Peter Jaman | KO (Left hook) | 1 | | 85kg Europe Tournament Reserve fight |
Preliminary Card
| 65kg | (Bosnia and Herzegovina) Semir Delic | def. | (Portugal) Joao Francisco | Decision | 4 | 3:00 | |
| 70kg | (United Kingdom) Vinny Church | def. | (Bosnia and Herzegovina) Nerdin Fejzovic | Ext.R Decision | 4 | 3:00 | |
| 88kg | (Bosnia and Herzegovina) Bahrudin Mamic | def. | (Greece) Alexander Gerekos | Decision | 3 | 3:00 | |

=== K-1 World GP 2016 Euro -85kg Tournament bracket ===
Quarter-finals
(Russia) Timur Aylyarov | KO
(Czech Republic) Vasil Ducar
(Croatia) Agron Preteni | DEC
(Spain) Imanol Rodriguez | 3-0
(Bosnia and Herzegovina) Igor Emkić | DEC
(Italy) Giuseppe De Domenico | 3-0
(France) David Radeff | DEC
(Serbia) Nikola Noveski | 3-0

Semi-finals
(Russia) Timur Aylyarov | DEC
(Croatia) Agron Preteni | 3-0
(Bosnia and Herzegovina) Igor Emkić | DEC
(France) David Radeff | 3-0

Final
(Russia) Timur Aylyarov | KO
(Bosnia and Herzegovina) Igor Emkić | 3

== See also ==
- List of K-1 events
- List of K-1 champions
- 2016 in Glory
- 2016 in SUPERKOMBAT
- 2016 in Kunlun Fight
