= Thomas Adamandopoulos =

Greek-Italian-French Muay Thai kickboxer

- Born: 22 September 1986 (age 40); France
- Nationality: (France) French
- Height: 1.70 m (5 ft 7 in)
- Weight: 63.5 kg (140 lb; 10.00 st)
- Division: Light Welterweight
- Style: Kickboxing, Muay Thai
- Fighting out of: Marseille, France
- Team: Mondial Boxing
- Trainer: Hervé Busonera
- Years active: 2007 – present

Kickboxing record
- Total: 44
- Wins: 30
- By knockout: 4
- Losses: 14
- By knockout: 0
- Draws: 0
- Last updated on: 17 September 2020

Thomas Adamandopoulos (born 22 September 1986) is a Greek-Italian-French Muay Thai kickboxer who currently trains in Marseille, France. He is a former ISKA world champion 135 lbs.

== Biography and career ==
Adamandopoulos trains in Marseille with his trainer Hervé Busonera. He fought Cyril Abbas at TK2 World MAX 2012 in Marseille, France, on 6 October 2012 and won by decision.

He rematched Karim Bennoui at Nuit des Champions in Marseille on 24 November 2012 in a fight for the WKN World Oriental Rules title (-62.100 kg) and lost by decision.

Adamandopoulos was scheduled to fight Alexander Arutyunyan at Supremacy II: Triumph in Stockholm, Sweden on 23 February 2013.

He attempted to make the first defence of his Krush title against Hideaki Yamazaki at Krush.27 in Tokyo, Japan on 20 March 2013 but was dropped with a spinning back fist in round two and lost by unanimous decision.

Adamandopoulos was knocked out by Modibo Diarra at La Nuit De Gladiateur in Marseille on 28 June 2013.

He beat Xavier Bastard on points in La 20ème Nuit des Champions -62 kg/136 lb tournament reserve match in Marseille, France on 23 November 2013.

He is well known in France due to his participation in Les Anges on NRJ12. He also appeared in one episode of the French series Plus belle la vie in 2007 (France 3).

== Titles and accomplishments ==
- 2012 KRUSH Super Lightweight Champion (-63.500 kg)
- 2011 I.S.K.A. World Kickboxing Champion (-62.300 kg)
- 2011 FIKB World Chauss'Fight Champion (-63.500 kg)
- 2011 FFSCDA French Cup K-1 Rules Champion (-63.500 kg)
- 2008 WAKO Pro European Kickboxing Champion (-63.500 kg)
- 2008 French Kickboxing Champion
- 2008 French Full Contact Champion
- 2007 K-1 Rules Tournament Champion in Loano, Italy
- 2007 European Amateur Full Contact Champion

== Muay Thai record ==
Muay Thai record
44 wins (25 (T)KOs), 17 losses, 1 draw
Date	Result	Opponent	Event	Location	Method	Round	Time
2018-10-27	Loss	(France) Geoffrey Mocci	TK2 World Max 2018	Marseille, France,	Decision (unanimous)	3	3:00
2016-10-08	Win	(France) Gabriel Moreno	TK2 World Max 2016	Marseille, France,	Decision (unanimous)	3	3:00
2015-06-05	Loss	(United States) Shane Oblonsky	Glory 22: Lille	Lille, France,	Decision (unanimous)	3	3:00
2014-11-22	Loss	(Spain) Javier Hernandez	La 21ème Nuit des Champions	Marseille, France	TKO	5	3:00
2014-06-12	Loss	(Brazil) Minoru Kimura	Krush 42	Japan	TKO (3 knockdowns/right uppercuts)	2	2:55
2013-11-23	Win	(France) Xavier Bastard	La 20ème Nuit des Champions, Reserve Match	Marseille, France	Decision	3	3:00
2013-06-28	Loss	(France) Modibo Diarra	La Nuit De Gladiateur	Marseille, France	KO		
2013-03-20	Loss	(Japan) Hideaki Yamazaki	Krush.27	Tokyo, Japan	Decision (unanimous)	3	3:00
Loses the Krush 63kg title.
2012-11-24	Loss	(France) Karim Bennoui	Nuit des Champions	Marseille, France	Decision	5	3:00
For the WKN World Oriental Rules title (-62.100 kg).
2012-10-06	Win	(France) Cyril Abbas	TK2 World Max 2012	Marseille, France	Decision	3	3:00
2012-08-12	Win	(Japan) Ryuji Kajiwara	Krush.21	Tokyo, Japan	KO (high kick)	2	1:42
Wins Krush title (-63.500 kg).
2012-05-19	Loss	(Turkey) Yetkin Özkul	Urban Boxing United	Marseille, France	TKO (referee stoppage)	4	
Fight was for K1 ISKA World title (-62.300 kg).
2011-11-12	Loss	(France) Karim Bennoui	La 18ème Nuit des Champions	Marseille, France	Decision (2–1)	5	3:00
Loses his I.S.K.A. World Kickboxing title (-62.300 kg).
2011-08-14	Win	(Japan) Keiji Ozaki	Krush.11	Tokyo, Japan	Decision (unanimous)	5	3:00
Wins I.S.K.A. World Kickboxing title (-62.300 kg).
2011-06-17	Loss	(France) Modibo Diarra	La 2ème Nuit des Gladiateurs	Marseille, France	KO (high kick)	3	
2011-05-27	Win	(Spain) Aitor Eguzkiza	K-1 Rules Kick Tournament 2011 in Marseille	Marseille, France	Decision	5	2:00
2011-05-07	Win	(France) Amar Lounas	Urban Boxing United 2	Marseille, France	Decision	3	3:00
2011-03-19	Win	(France) Hirachidine Saindou	Le 8ème Trophée de l'Ephèbe	Agde, France	TKO (referee stoppage)	4	
2011-02-26	Win	(France) Lionel Diderot	Coupe de France FFSCDA K-1 Rules	Arles, France	TKO	2	
Wins FFSCDA French Cup K-1 Rules title (-63.500 kg).
2010-11-26	Win	(France) Cédrick Peynaud	La Nuit des Champions 2010	Marseille, France	KO (right high kick)	1	2:16
2010-06-18	Win	(Italy) Roberto Straffalaci	La Nuit des Gladiateurs	Marseille, France	KO	4	
2010-06-04	Loss	(France) Olivier Tchétché	Muaythaitv Trophy 2010 - Etape 3	Paris, France	Decision	3	3:00
2010-04-24	Loss	(France) Boubacar Konta	Fight Zone IV	Villeurbanne, France	Decision (unanimous)	3	3:00
2010-02-13	Win	(France) Tristan Benard	Stars Night 2010	Vitrolles, France	Decision	5	3:00
2010-01-08	Win	(France) Mamadou Diabira	Muaythaitv Trophy 2010 - Etape 2	Marseille, France	Decision	3	3:00
2009-11-21	Loss	(Cameroon) Herbert Womaleu	Muaythaitv Trophy 2010 - Etape 1	Saint-Estève, France	TKO (referee stoppage)	4	
2009-11-14	Loss	(France) Damien Alamos	La Nuit des Champions 2009	Marseille, France	Decision	5	3:00
Fight was for French Muaythai title (-63.500 kg).
2009-10-09	Win	(France) Jonathan Lidon	TK2 World MAX 2009	Aix-en-Provence, France	Decision	3	3:00
2009-06-27	Win	(France) Madjid Teggia	All Stars Kickboxing 2009	Gémenos, France	KO (high kick)	2	
2009-06-13	Loss	(Italy) Alessandro Alias	The Night of Superfight	Italy	Ext R. decision	4	3:00
Fight was for Kombat League European K-1 Rules title (-63.500 kg).
2009-04-18	Win	(France) Boubacar Konta	Fight Zone III	Villeurbanne, France	Decision (unanimous)	5	2:00
2009-02-06	Win	(France) Jonathan Iniacio	K-1 Rules Kick Tournament 2009 in Marseille	Marseille, France	TKO	2	
2008-12-19	Win	(Turkey) Yetkin Özkul	Kickboxing Championnat D'Europe	Marseille, France	Decision (unanimous)	3	3:00
2008-11-29	Win	(France) Amar Lamèche	La Nuit des Champions 2008	Marseille, France	Decision	3	3:00
2008-09-27	Win	(France) Jérémy Caillol	F-1 World Max 2008	Meyreuil, France	Decision	5	3:00
2008-06-07	Draw	(France) Amar Lounas	La Nuit des Challenges 5	Lyon, Saint-Fons, France	Decision draw	5	3:00
2008-03-07	Win	(France) Florent Martins	All Stars Kickboxing 2008	Marseille, France	KO (right high kick)	4	
Wins Wako Pro European Kickboxing title (-63.500 kg).
2008-01-02	Loss	(France) Yohan Havan	K-1 Rules Kick Tournament 2008 in Marseille	Marseille, France	Decision	5	2:00
2007-12-08	Win	(Italy) Abdul Habbou	Quarto Memorial Mimmo Polizzano, Final	Loano, Italy	Ext R. decision	4	2:00
Wins 8 Men K-1 Tournament title.
2007-12-08	Win	(Italy) Alessio Cassara	Quarto Memorial Mimmo Polizzano, Semi Final	Loano, Italy			
2007-12-08	Win		Quarto Memorial Mimmo Polizzano, Quarter Final	Loano, Italy			
2007-11-17	Win	(France) Lucien Gross	La Nuit des Champions 2007	Marseille, France	Decision	3	3:00
2007-00-00	Win	(France) Khader Becharef	European Amateur Full-Contact Championship	France	Decision	5	2:00
Wins European Full-Contact title (-63.500 kg).
Legend: Win Loss Draw/no contest Notes

== See also ==
- List of male kickboxers
