= Karim Bennoui =

Algerian kickboxer (born 1988)

- Born: 26 January 1988 (age 38); Bourgoin-Jallieu
- Height: 1.73 m (5 ft 8 in)
- Weight: 61.0 kg (134.5 lb; 9.61 st)
- Division: Super Lightweight
- Style: Muay Thai
- Fighting out of: Lyon - Saint-Fons, France
- Team: Gym boxing St Fons - Team Nasser K.
- Trainer: Nasser Kacem
- Years active: (1997–present)

Kickboxing record
- Total: 60
- Wins: 41
- By knockout: 13
- Losses: 16
- By knockout: 2
- Draws: 3

Other information
- Notable relatives: Houcine Bennoui, brother
- Last updated on: 13 March 2013

Karim Bennoui (born 26 January 1988), also known as "Le Chirurgien", is an Algerian Muay Thai kickboxer. He is a three-time WKN super featherweight (oriental rules) champion. He is also a former It's Showtime -61 kg champion and ISKA -62.3 kg champion.

== Biography and career ==
=== Biography ===
Karim Bennoui was born on 26 January 1988. Bennoui resides in Lyon, France and trains at Gym boxing St Fons in Lyon, Saint-Fons. His trainer is Nasser Kacem. He is of Algerian descent.

He begins Muaythai at the age of 10, with Nasser Kacem who was educator in the suburbs of Lyon. His younger brother, Houcine Bennoui, also practices in professional muaythai.

=== Early career ===
It counts 38 fights for 30 wins (including 13 by knockout), 6 defeats and 2 draws. Karim Bennoui fought in Muaythai and Kickboxing.

In 2009 he became French Muay Thai Champion FMDA Class A and in 2011 at only 23 years he won the It's Showtime 61MAX world title -61 kg.

He was scheduled to face Plynoi Por Paoin at Thai Fight: Lyon on 19 September 2012 in Lyon, France. The fight was cancelled, however, when Plynoi suffered a knockout loss against Hiroki Ishii in Japan four days before.

He rematched Thomas Adamandopoulos at Nuit des Champions in Marseilles on 24 November 2012 in a fight for the WKN World Oriental Rules title (-62.100 kg) and won by decision.

Bennoui was then expected to fight Koya Urabe at Krush.25 in Tokyo, Japan on 14 December 2012. However, he was forced to pull out of the bout due to an injury to his right hand sustained in the Adamandopoulos fight. He was replaced by Mickael Peynaud.

He lost to Masahiro Yamamoto via an extension round unanimous decision at RISE 92 on 17 March 2013 in Tokyo.

He was set to fight Aranchai Kiatpatarapan at the WBC World Muay Thai Millennium Championship in Saint-Pierre, Réunion on 7 September 2013 but the event fell through.

He won La 20ème Nuit des Champions -62 kg/136 lb tournament in Marseille, France on 23 November 2013, beating both Raz Sarkisjan and Yetkin Özkul on points.

=== ONE Championship ===
As replacing undisclosed reason of Johan Estupiñan, Bennoui made his promotional debut against Saeksan Or. Kwanmuang on November 4, 2023, at ONE Fight Night 16. He lost the fight via unanimous decision.

== Titles and achievements ==
- 2019 Arena Fight Featherweight Kickboxing Champion (-63.000 kg)
- 2017 WKN super featherweight oriental rules champion (one defense)
- 2013 NDC K-1 Rules -62 kg Tournament Champion
- 2012 WKN super featherweight oriental rules champion
- 2011 I.S.K.A. World Kickboxing Champion (-62.300 kg)
- 2011 It's Showtime World Champion -61 kg
- 2009 French Muaythai Champion FMDA Class A Champion -60 kg

== Fight record ==
Kickboxing record
44 wins (13 (T)KOs), 13 losses, 3 draws
Date	Result	Opponent	Event	Location	Method	Round	Time
2023-11-04	Loss	(Thailand) Saeksan Or. Kwanmuang	ONE Fight Night 16	Bangkok, Singapore	Decision (unanimous)	3	3:00
2023-04-29	Win	(Spain) Carlos Campos	Fight Night One	Chalon-sur-Saône, France	Decision	3	3:00
2022-05-14	Win	(Cuba) Dante Garcia Aquey	Generation Fighter 3	Valentigney, France	TKO (punches)	5	
Defends WKN World super featherweight title (oriental rules)
2021-10-23	Win	(Italy) Neguse Kebrome	Generation Fighter 2	Valentigney, France	Decision	3	3:00
2021-09-30	Win	(Italy) Angel Chavdarov	MFC 8	Roussillon, France	Decision	3	3:00
2019-06-08	Win	(France) Tristan Benard	Arena Fight	France	Decision (split)	5	3:00
Wins Arena Fight Featherweight Kickboxing Title (-63.000 kg).
2019-03-30	Loss	(China) Meng Guodong	Wu Lin Feng 2019: WLF x Lumpinee - China vs Thailand	Zhengzhou, China	Decision	3	3:00
2018-12-01	Loss	(Italy) Christian Faustino	Yokkao Next Generation	Italy	Decision	3	3:00
2018-10-27	Win	(Slovakia) Lukas Mandinec	Fight Legend Geneva	Geneva, Switzerland	Decision (majority)	3	3:00
2018-05-03	Win	(Romania) Cristian Spetcu	MFC 7	France	Decision	3	3:00
2017-11-25	Loss	(France) Eddy Nait Slimani	Nuit Des Champions 2017	Marseille, France	Decision	3	3:00
2017-05-03	Win	(Austria) Sasa Jovanovic	Dubai Fight	Dubai	Decision	5	3:00
Wins WKN World super featherweight title (oriental rules)
2017-03-09	Win	(Thailand) Phetpeekart	MFC 6	France	Decision	5	3:00
2016-09-19	Loss	(Japan) Koya Urabe	K-1 World GP 2016 -60kg World Tournament, Quarter Finals	Tokyo, Japan	Decision (unanimous)	3	3:00
2016-03-05	Win	(Spain) Daniel Puertas Gallardo	MFC 4	France	Decision	5	3:00
2015-11-14	Win	(Spain) Javier Hernández	La 22ème Nuit Des Champions	Francia	Decision (unanimous)	3	3:00
2015-10-10	Loss	(England) Christopher Shaw	Yokkao 14 & 15	United Kingdom	Decision		
2015-03-21	Win	(England) Darren O'Connor	Yokkao 12 & 13	United Kingdom	Decision (unanimous)	3	3:00
2015-01-18	Loss	(Japan) Hirotaka Urabe	K-1 World GP 2015 -60kg Championship Tournament, Quarter Finals	Tokyo, Japan	TKO (cut)	1	2:03
2014-12-05	Loss	(Thailand) Yodpayak	La Ligue des Galdiateurs	Thailand	Decision	5	3:00
2014-11-22	Win	(Japan) Koya Urabe	La 21ème Nuit des Champions	Marseille, France	Decision (split)	5	3:00
Defends NDC K-1 Rules -62 kg/136 lb Championship.
2014-09-20	Win	(Thailand) Chatchainoi Sitbenjma	La Nuit Des Challenges 13	Saint-Fons, France	Decision	5	3:00
2014-05-30	Loss	(Italy) Antonio Campagna	Final Fight	Le Havre, France	Decision	3	3:00
2013-11-23	Win	(Turkey) Yetkin Özkul	La 20ème Nuit des Champions, Final	Marseilles, France	Decision	3	3:00
Wins NDC K-1 Rules -62 kg/136 lb Tournament Championship.
2013-11-23	Win	(Armenia) Raz Sarkisjan	La 20ème Nuit des Champions, Semi finals	Marseilles, France	Decision	3	3:00
2013-09-21	Loss	(Thailand) Kwankhao Mor.Ratanabandit	La Nuit des Challenges 12	Saint-Fons, France	Decision	5	3:00
2013-03-17	Loss	(Japan) Masahiro Yamamoto	RISE 92	Tokyo, Japan	Extension round decision (unanimous)	4	3:00
2012-11-24	Win	(France) Thomas Adamandopoulos	Nuit des Champions	Marseille, France	Decision	5	3:00
Wins WKN World super featherweight title (oriental rules)
2012-01-21	Draw	(Thailand) Pajonsuk Por. Pramuk	Yokkao Extreme 2012	Milan, Italy	Decision draw	5	3:00
2011-11-12	Win	(France) Thomas Adamandopoulos	La 18ème Nuit des Champions	Marseille, France	Decision (2–1)	5	3:00
Wins I.S.K.A. World Kickboxing title (-62.300 kg).
2011-06-18	Loss	(Spain) Javier Hernandez	Fix Events & Fightclub Group presents: It's Showtime 2011	Madrid, Spain	Decision (unanimous)	5	3:00
Loses his It's Showtime 61MAX world title -61 kg.
2011-03-26	Win	(Suriname) Sergio Wielzen	BFN Group presents: It's Showtime Brussels	Brussels, Belgium	Decision (split)	5	3:00
Wins It's Showtime 61MAX world title -61 kg.
2010-10-09	Win	(Italy) Antonio Campagna	K-1 Shardana	Sardinia, Italy	Decision	3	3:00
2010-06-19	Loss	(France) Mickael Peynaud	Explosion Fight Night Volume 01	Brest, France	Decision	5	3:00
Fight was for French Championship K1 Pro FFSCDA 5x3 -61.5 kg.
2010-06-05	Win	(France) Xavier Bastard	La Nuit des Challenges 8	Saint-Fons, France	TKO (referee stoppage/cut)	3	
2010-04-03	Win	(France) Vatsana Sedone	Muaythai Gala in Divonne	Divonne-les-Bains, France	Decision	5	3:00
2009-11-28	Loss	(Thailand) Laimangkorn Chuwattana	A-1 World Cup Combat Lyon	Lyon, France	Decision	5	3:00
2009-06-20	Win	(France) Néhémie Félicité	La Nuit de la Boxe 2009	Martinique	TKO (threw in the towel)	5	
Wins French Championship FMDA 2009 Class A -60 kg.
2009-05-16	Loss	(France) Albert Veera Chey	Légendes et Guerriers	Toulouse, France	TKO (referee stoppage)	5	
2009-04-11	Loss	(France) Mickael Peynaud	Carcharias Team Boxing Gala	Perpignan, France	Decision	3	3:00
2008-10-25	Loss	(France) Vatsana Sedone	Le Choc des Best Fighters 1	Asnières-sur-Seine, France	Decision	5	3:00
2008-06-07	Win	(Italy) Patrick Carta	La Nuit des Challenges 5	Saint-Fons, France	Decision	5	3:00
2008-03-02	Draw	(Italy) Matteo Luppi	Fighting Day 8	Imola, Italy	Decision draw	3	3:00
Legend: Win Loss Draw/no contest Notes

== See also ==
- List of male kickboxers
