= Masahiro Yamamoto (kickboxer) =

Japanese kickboxer

- Born: April 14, 1983 (age 43); Nagasaki, Japan
- Native name: 山本真弘
- Other names: Speedmaster
- Height: 1.65 m (5 ft 5 in)
- Weight: 63 kg (139 lb; 9.9 st)
- Division: Featherweight; Lightweight
- Style: Kickboxing, Kyokushin Karate
- Stance: Southpaw
- Fighting out of: Tokyo, Japan
- Team: Fujiwara Gym
- Trainer: Toshio Fujiwara
- Rank: Black belt in kyokushin Blue belt in Brazilian jiu-jitsu
- Years active: 2002-present

Kickboxing record
- Total: 65
- Wins: 42
- By knockout: 12
- Losses: 17
- By knockout: 11
- Draws: 6

Masahiro Yamamoto (山本真弘, Yamamoto Masahiro; born April 14, 1983) is a retired Japanese kickboxer. He is a former AJKF Featherweight champion, the 2009 Krush Lightweight Grand Prix winner and It's Showtime 61MAX Champion.

== Career ==
=== Early career ===
Yamamoto began practicing Kyokushin karate as a schoolboy and won the all-Japan junior high school full contact karate championships in 2000, followed by the high school championships the following year. He would later begin kickboxing under the legendary Toshio Fujiwara at the Fujiwara Gym in Tokyo, and debuted professionally with a unanimous decision win over Hideki Shimizu at AJKF: Golden Trigger on September 6, 2002.

After amassing an undefeated record of 7-0-2 fighting in the All Japan Kickboxing Federation, Yamamoto was invited to compete in the promotion's Strongest Lightweight Tournament 2004. Having defeated Hiromasa Masuda by unanimous decision at the tournament's opening round on March 13, 2004, he then tasted defeat for the first time at the hands of the eventual tournament winner, Tsogto Amara, when he lost a majority decision in the quarter-finals on April 16, 2004.

He rebounded with three straight victories to earn himself a shot at the AJKF Featherweight (-57 kg/126 lb) Championship against Genki Yamamoto at the Fujiwara Festival 2004 on December 5, 2004. After five rounds of fighting, the bout was called a draw, meaning Genki kept the title.

=== Domestic dominance ===
2005 saw Yamamoto wear gold for the first time in his career by winning the IKUSA 2005 –60 kg/132 lb Grand Prix. A first round knockout of Koishiwara at the quarter-final stage on June 18, 2005 was followed up by a points victory over Tomohiro Oikawa in the semis and then a technical knockout win against Naoki Ishikawa in the final on the same night three months later as Yamamoto claimed the crown. This led him to a rematch with Genki Yamamoto for the AJKF Featherweight title on January 4, 2006 at the New Year Kick Festival 2006, where he won a majority decision and became the new Japanese champion.

Yamamoto then went through a rough patch, however, as he went 2-3-1 in his next six fights with all three losses against Thai opposition. At the end of 2007, he was given the chance to get back on track by entering the AJKF's Best of 60 kg Tournament 2007. A second-round knockout of Susumu Daiguji on August 25, 2007 sent him into the semi-finals two months later where he took a unanimous points victory over Naoki Ishikawa, in what was the third fight between the pair. Later that night, Yamamoto defeated Haruaki Otsuki by the same margin in a five-round affair to emerge as Japan's top kickboxer at 60 kg/132 lb.

On January 4, 2008, he made the first and only defence of his AJKF Featherweight strap by knocking Yosuke Mizuochi out with a high kick in round four at the New Year Kick Festival 2008. After being stopped by Muay Thai exponents PKP Rachanon F16 and Wanrop Weerasakreck in his next two outings, he then returned to winning ways with four consecutive victories which earned him a call up to fight on kickboxing's biggest stage, K-1. Making his promotional debut at the K-1 World MAX 2009 World Championship Tournament Final 16 in Fukuoka, Japan, on April 21, 2009, Yamamoto outpointed Yuki to a unanimous judges' decision after flooring his opponent with a knee strike in the third and final round.

Despite a knockout loss to Yuji Takeuchi in his next fight at Krush.3 less than a month later, he was asked to fight in the Krush Lightweight Grand Prix 2009. The tournament kicked off with the first round and quarter-finals on July 24, 2009 and Yamamoto defeated both Junpei Aotsu and Haruaki Otsuki by decision to advance to the final stage on November 2. He met Genki Yamamoto for the third time in the semis and an extension round was needed to separate them, after which Masahiro was given the nod to advance to the final where he went up against Yuta Kubo. Yamamoto sent Kubo to the canvas late in the third round of a back-and-forth war to secure the unanimous decision victory and the third tournament title of his career.

Having already established himself as arguably the top kickboxer at 63 kg/138 lb, Yamamoto returned to K-1 as one of the favourites to win the K-1 World MAX 2010 –63 kg Japan Tournament. He was drawn against Tetsuya Yamato in the opening stage of the tournament held at the K-1 World MAX 2010 -63kg Japan Tournament Final 16 in Tokyo on May 2, 2010 and suffered a significant upset when he was beaten via unanimous decision after an extension round by the unfancied Yamato who would go on to win the whole tournament.

=== International emergence ===
Even after two losses in a row following a points defeat to Ryuichi Mukaiyama under Muay Thai rules, Yamamoto was still being held in high regard and was recruited by the European It's Showtime promotion to challenge for Sergio Wielzen's It's Showtime 61MAX (-61kg/134lb) Championship. In his international debut and first attempt at a world title, he met Wielzen at Yiannis Evgenikos presents: It’s Showtime Athens on December 11, 2010 in Athens, Greece. Yamamoto was floored by a knee to the body in round one and was stopped from continuing on the doctor's orders in round three due to cut above his right eye, losing by TKO.

Yamamoto then returned to Japan and racked up a record of 4-0-1 throughout 2011 and early 2012 to earn himself another shot at the It's Showtime 61MAX belt, which was now around the waist of Javier Hernandez. The run included decision wins over Arito Tsukahara, Kan Itabashi and Genki Kanazawa under the It's Showtime Japan banner. Hernandez and Yamamoto faced off at Street Culture, Federación Canaria de Kickboxing & Fightclub Group present: It's Showtime 59 in Tenerife, Spain, on July 21, 2012, and Yamamoto become the new world champion by unanimous decision after using good boxing and knees to outpoint the Spaniard.

He was expected to fight on an It's Showtime card in Yokohama, Japan, on November 17, 2012 but the event was cancelled following the promotion's acquisition by Glory.

He was ranked at #2 behind Masaaki Noiri when the lightweight world rankings were first published by LiverKick in September 2012, but he slipped down to #3 come November as Karim Bennoui nipped in front of him.

On December 2, 2012. Yamamoto faced Dutch import Mansour Yaqubi at RISE/M-1 ~Infinity~ in Tokyo, Japan. Despite being floored by Yaqubi at the beginning of the third round, he was able score three knockdowns for himself before the final bell, forcing a referee stoppage.

He defeated his third international opponent on the bounce when he took an extension round unanimous decision over Karim Bennoui at RISE 92 on March 17, 2013 in Tokyo.

Yamamoto got his revenge over Sergio Wielzen at RISE 94 in Tokyo on July 20, 2013, knocking the Surinamese fighter out with a second round high kick. With this win, he defeated the three other It's Showtime 61MAX Champions.

He participated in La 20ème Nuit des Champions -62 kg/136 lb tournament featuring four of the world's best lightweights in Marseille, France, on November 23, 2013, losing to Yetkin Özkul on points in the semi-finals to exit the competition.

== Championships and awards ==
=== Kickboxing ===
- All Japan Kickboxing Federation
  - AJKF Featherweight (-57 kg/126 lb) Championship
  - AJKF The Best of 60 kg/132 lb Tournament 2007 Champion
- IKUSA
  - IKUSA 2005 –60 kg/132 lb Grand Prix Champion
- It's Showtime
  - It's Showtime 61MAX (-61kg/134lb) Championship
- Krush
  - Krush Lightweight (-63 kg/138 lb) Grand Prix 2009 Champion

Awards

- eFight.jp
  - Fighter of the Month (July 2012)

== Kickboxing record ==
Kickboxing record
46 wins (12 KOs), 22 losses, 7 draws
Date	Result	Opponent	Event	Location	Method	Round	Time	Record
2020-11-03	Loss	(Japan) Satoru Nariai	K-1 World GP 2020 in Fukuoka	Fukuoka, Japan	Decision (Unanimous)	3	3:00	46-22-6
2018-11-21	Loss	(Japan) Yuzuki Satomi	Krush 95	Japan	KO (Left Cross)	2	1:59	46-21-6
2018-08-18	Loss	(Japan) Tatsuya Oiwa	Krush 92	Japan	TKO (Referee Stoppage)	2	2:58	46-20-6
2018-05-26	Loss	(China) Yun Qi	Glory of Heroes 31: Beijing	Beijing, China	Decision (unanimous)	3	3:00	46-19-6
2017-09-18	Loss	(Japan) Hirotaka Urabe	K-1 World GP 2016 -67.5kg World Tournament, Superfight	Tokyo, Japan	TKO (3 Knockdowns/Straight Right)	2	2:50	46-18-6
2017-02-18	Loss	(Japan) Riku Anpo	Krush.73	Japan	KO (Punches)	1	2:05	46-17-6
2016-12-18	Win	(Japan) Go Kato	Krush.71	Japan	Decision (Unanimous)	3	3:00	46-16-6
2016-04-24	Loss	(Japan) Taiga	K-1 World GP 2016 -60kg Japan Tournament, Quarter Finals	Tokyo, Japan	KO (Flying Knee)	1	1:47	45-16-6
2015-12-04	Loss	(Japan) Toshi	Krush.61	Japan	KO (Left Hook)	1	2:15	45-15-6
2015-08-14	Loss	(Japan) Leona Pettas	Krush.56	Japan	Decision (Unanimous)	3	3:00	45-14-6
2015-05-04	Win	(Japan) Shota Kanbe	Krush.54	Japan	Ext.R TKO (Doctor Stoppage)	4	1:54	45-13-6
2015-01-18	Loss	(Japan) Koya Urabe	K-1 World GP 2015 -60kg Championship Tournament, Semi Finals	Tokyo, Japan	KO (Low Kick)	1	2:44	44-13-6
2015-01-18	Win	(France) Gagny Baradji	K-1 World GP 2015 -60kg Championship Tournament, Quarter Finals	Tokyo, Japan	Decision (Majority)	3	3:00	44-12-6
2014-11-06	Win	(Japan) Junpei Aotsu	Krush.47	Tokyo, Japan	Decision (Unanimous)	3	3:00	43-12-6
2014-08-09	Loss	(Japan) Hirotaka Urabe	Krush.44	Tokyo, Japan	Decision (Unanimous)	3	3:00	42-12-6
2014-04-15	Win	(Netherlands) Yanis El Hajoui	Krush.40	Tokyo, Japan	Decision (Majority)	3	3:00	42-11-6
2013-11-23	Loss	(Turkey) Yetkin Özkul	La 20ème Nuit des Champions, Semi Finals	Marseilles, France	Decision	3	3:00	41-11-6
2013-07-20	Win	(Suriname) Sergio Wielzen	RISE 94	Tokyo, Japan	KO (left high kick)	2	1:36	41-10-6
2013-03-17	Win	(France) Karim Bennoui	RISE 92	Tokyo, Japan	Ext.R decision (unanimous)	4	3:00	40-10-6
2012-12-02	Win	(Netherlands) Mansour Yaqubi	RISE/M-1 ~Infinity~	Tokyo, Japan	TKO (referee stoppage)	3	2:46	39-10-6
2012-07-21	Win	(Spain) Javier Hernandez	It's Showtime 59	Tenerife, Spain	Decision (unanimous)	5	3:00	38-10-6
Wins the It's Showtime 61MAX (-61kg/134lb) Championship.
2012-03-25	Win	(Japan) Turbo	M-1 Muay Thai Challenge: Sutt Yod Muaythai Vol.1	Tokyo, Japan	Decision (unanimous)	3	3:00	37-10-6
2011-12-22	Win	(Japan) Genki Kanazawa	It's Showtime Japan 6	Tokyo, Japan	Decision (unanimous)	3	3:00	36-10-6
2011-10-23	Win	(Japan) Kan Itabashi	REBELS.9 & It's Showtime Japan 4	Tokyo, Japan	Decision (unanimous)	3	3:00	35-10-6
2011-08-28	Win	(Japan) Arito Tsukahara	It's Showtime Japan 2	Tokyo, Japan	Decision (majority)	3	3:00	34-10-6
2011-04-24	Draw	(Japan) Satoshi Nakamura	REBELS.7	Tokyo, Japan	Decision draw	5	3:00	33-10-6
2010-12-11	Loss	(Suriname) Sergio Wielzen	Yiannis Evgenikos presents: It’s Showtime Athens	Athens, Greece	TKO (cut)	3	1:45	33-10-5
For the It's Showtime 61MAX (-61kg/134lb) Championship.
2010-09-26	Loss	(Japan) Ryuichi Mukaiyama	WBC Muaythai: The Road to World Champion	Tokyo, Japan	Decision (unanimous)	5	3:00	33-9-5
2010-05-02	Loss	(Japan) Tetsuya Yamato	K-1 World MAX 2010 -63kg Japan Tournament Final 16, First Round	Tokyo, Japan	Ext.R decision (unanimous)	4	3:00	33-8-5
2010-04-07	Win	(Japan) Kan Itabashi	RISE 63	Tokyo, Japan	Ext.R decision (unanimous)	4	3:00	33-7-5
2009-12-11	Win	(Japan) Yoshinori Nakasuka	Fujiwara Festival 2009	Tokyo, Japan	Ext.R decision (unanimous)	4	3:00	32-7-5
2009-11-02	Win	(Japan) Yuta Kubo	Krush Lightweight Grand Prix 2009 〜Round.2〜, Final	Tokyo, Japan	Decision (unanimous)	3	3:00	31-7-5
Wins the Krush Lightweight (-63kg/138lb) Grand Prix 2009 tournament title.
2009-11-02	Win	(Japan) Genki Yamamoto	Krush Lightweight Grand Prix 2009 〜Round.2〜, Semi Finals	Tokyo, Japan	Ext.R decision (unanimous)	4	3:00	30-7-5
2009-07-24	Win	(Japan) Haruaki Otsuki	Krush Lightweight Grand Prix 2009 〜Round.1〜, Quarter Finals	Tokyo, Japan	Decision (majority)	3	3:00	29-7-5
2009-07-24	Win	(Japan) Junpei Aotsu	Krush Lightweight Grand Prix 2009 〜Round.1〜, First Round	Tokyo, Japan	Decision (unanimous)	3	3:00	28-7-5
2009-05-17	Loss	(Japan) Yuji Takeuchi	Krush.3	Tokyo, Japan	KO (left hook)	2	1:38	27-7-5
2009-04-21	Win	(Japan) Yuki	K-1 World MAX 2009 World Championship Tournament Final 16	Fukuoka, Japan	Decision (unanimous)	3	3:00	27-6-5
2009-03-14	Win	(Japan) Kunitaka Fujiwara	Krush.2	Tokyo, Japan	Decision (unanimous)	3	3:00	26-6-5
2009-01-04	Win	(Thailand) Petcheak Sor. Suwanpakdee	AJKF: New Year Kick Festival 2009	Tokyo, Japan	TKO (doctor stoppage)	2	1:58	25-6-5
2008-11-08	Win	(Japan) Akira	Krush ~Kickboxing Destruction~	Tokyo, Japan	KO (left uppercut)	1	2:33	24-6-5
2008-09-19	Win	(Thailand) Kompayak Weerasakreck	AJKF: Sword Fight 2008	Tokyo, Japan	Decision (majority)	5	3:00	23-6-5
2008-06-22	Loss	(Thailand) Wanlop Weerasakreck	AJKF: Blitz	Tokyo, Japan	KO (left elbow)	2	2:14	22-6-5
2008-03-20	Loss	(Thailand) F-16 Rachanon	AJKF: Kick On!	Tokyo, Japan	TKO (cut)	4	0:19	22-5-5
2008-01-04	Win	(Japan) Yosuke Mizuochi	AJKF: New Year Kick Festival 2008	Tokyo, Japan	KO (left high kick)	4	2:50	22-4-5
Retains the AJKF Featherweight (-57 kg/126 lb) Championship.
2007-10-25	Win	(Japan) Haruaki Otsuki	AJKF: The Best of 60 kg Tournament 2007 Final, Final	Tokyo, Japan	Decision (unanimous)	5	3:00	21-4-5
Wins the AJKF: The Best of 60kg/132lb Tournament 2007 title.
2007-10-25	Win	(Japan) Naoki Ishikawa	AJKF: The Best of 60 kg Tournament 2007 Final, Semi Finals	Tokyo, Japan	Decision (unanimous)	3	3:00	20-4-5
2007-08-25	Win	(Japan) Susumu Daiguji	AJKF: The Best of 60 kg Tournament 2007 Opener, Quarter Finals	Tokyo, Japan	KO (left cross)	2	2:33	19-4-5
2007-06-17	Loss	(Thailand) Weerachai Chuwattana			TKO (referee stoppage)	4	0:53	18-4-5
2007-05-11	Win	(Thailand) Mongkontorn Ponsongkram	AJKF: Rearm	Tokyo, Japan	KO (left cross)	3	0:56	18-3-5
2007-03-09	Draw	(Japan) Arashi Fujihara	AJKF	Tokyo, Japan	decision (majority)	5	3:00	17-3-5
2006-12-08	Win	(Japan) Hiroshi Iwakiri	AJKF: Fujiwara Festival 2006	Tokyo, Japan	Ext.R decision (unanimous)	4	3:00	17-3-4
2006-06-11	Loss	(Thailand) Daratai Kiatpayattai	AJKF: Triumph	Tokyo, Japan	Decision (unanimous)	3	3:00	16-3-4
2006-03-19	Loss	(Thailand) Wanlop Weerasakreck	AJKF: Sword Fight 2006	Tokyo, Japan	KO (right front kick)	3	2:48	16-2-4
2006-01-04	Win	(Japan) Genki Yamamoto	AJKF: New Year Kick Festival 2006	Tokyo, Japan	Decision (majority)	5	3:00	16-1-4
Wins the AJKF Featherweight (-57 kg/126 lb) Championship.
2005-11-05	Win	(Japan) Ichiro Otaka	AJKF: Rock'n Roll	Tokyo, Japan	Decision (unanimous)	3	3:00	15-1-4
2005-09-19	Win	(Japan) Naoki Ishikawa	IKUSA 2005 –60 kg Grand Prix Final Stage, Final	Tokyo, Japan	TKO (referee stoppage)	3	2:05	14-1-4
Wins the IKUSA 2005 -60kg/132lb Grand Prix title.
2005-09-19	Win	(Japan) Tomohiro Oikawa	IKUSA 2005 –60 kg Grand Prix Final Stage, Semi Finals	Tokyo, Japan	Decision (unanimous)	3	3:00	13-1-4
2005-06-18	Win	(Japan) Koishiwara	IKUSA 2005 –60 kg Grand Prix Opening Stage, Quarter Finals	Tokyo, Japan	KO (left hook)	1	3:00	12-1-4
2005-03-18	Draw	(Thailand) Chinchai Maimuangkon	AJKF: Rush!	Tokyo, Japan	Decision	5	3:00	11-1-4
2004-12-05	Draw	(Japan) Genki Yamamoto	AJKF: Fujiwara Festival 2004	Tokyo, Japan	Decision	5	3:00	11-1-3
For the AJKF Featherweight (-57 kg/126 lb) Championship.
2004-10-17	Win	(Japan) Naoki Ishikawa	AJKF: Hard Blow	Tokyo, Japan	Decision (unanimous)	5	3:00	11-1-2
2004-08-22	Win	(Japan) Noriyuki Hiratani	AJKF: Lightning	Tokyo, Japan	TKO (cut)	2	0:27	10-1-2
2004-06-18	Win	(Japan) Rascal Taka	AJKF: Strongest Lightweight Tournament Final Stage	Tokyo, Japan	Decision (majority)	3	3:00	9-1-2
2004-04-16	Loss	(Mongolia) Tsogto Amara	AJKF: Strongest Lightweight Tournament 2nd Stage, Quarter Finals	Tokyo, Japan	Decision (majority)	3	3:00	8-1-2
2004-03-13	Win	(Japan) Hiromasa Masuda	AJKF: Strongest Lightweight Tournament 2004 1st Stage, First Round	Tokyo, Japan	Decision (unanimous)	3	3:00	8-0-2
2003-12-07	Draw	(Japan) Noriyuki Hiratani	AJKF: Fujiwara Festival 2003	Tokyo, Japan	Decision(Majority)	5	3:00	7-0-2
2003-08-17	Win	(Japan) Satoruvashicoba	AJKF: Hurricane Blow	Tokyo, Japan	TKO (cut)	2	2:43	7-0-1
2003-05-23	Win	(Japan) Kenji Takemura	AJKF: Strongest Lightweight Tournament 2003 Final	Tokyo, Japan	Decision (unanimous)	3	3:00	6-0-1
2003-03-08	Win	(Japan) Akira Iwasa	AJKF: Strongest Lightweight Tournament 2003 1st Stage	Tokyo, Japan	Decision (unanimous)	3	3:00	5-0-1
2003-02-07	Win	(Japan) Atsushi Kumagai	AJKF: Red Zone	Tokyo, Japan	TKO (referee stoppage)	2	1:10	4-0-1
2003-01-04	Win	(Japan) Tsuyoshi Kurihara	AJKF: Kick Energy	Tokyo, Japan	Decision (unanimous)	3	3:00	3-0-1
2002-11-17	Draw	(Japan) Yoshikazu Murayama	AJKF: Back From Hell I	Tokyo, Japan	Majority draw	3	3:00	2-0-1
2002-10-17	Win	(Japan) Takashi Mikajiri	AJKF: Brandnew Fight	Tokyo, Japan	Decision (unanimous)	3	3:00	2-0
2002-09-06	Win	(Japan) Hideki Shimizu	AJKF: Golden Trigger	Tokyo, Japan	Decision (unanimous)	3	3:00	1-0
Legend: Win Loss Draw/No contest Notes
