= Koya Urabe =

Japanese kickboxer (born 1990)

- Born: June 7, 1990 (age 36); Chiba Prefecture, Japan
- Other names: Untouchable
- Nationality: Japanese
- Height: 172 cm (5 ft 8 in)
- Weight: 62.5 kg (138 lb; 9.84 st)
- Style: Ashihara Karate, kickboxing
- Stance: Southpaw
- Fighting out of: Tokyo, Japan
- Team: Nishiyama Dojo (2009); Team Dragon (2009-2016); K-1 Gym KREST (2017-present)
- Trainer: Masakazu Watanabe; Kensaku Maeda
- Rank: Black belt in Ashihara Karate
- Years active: 2009—2024

Kickboxing record
- Total: 64
- Wins: 52
- By knockout: 13
- Losses: 12
- By knockout: 3

Other information
- Notable relatives: Hirotaka Urabe (brother); Yu Takahashi (sister-in-law); Maryjun Takahashi (sister-in-law); Yuji Takahashi (brother-in-law); Jui Takajo (sister-in-law); Aki Takajo (sister-in-law)

Koya Urabe (卜部功也, Urabe Kōya) is a retired Japanese kickboxer, who competed professionally in the super featherweight and lightweight divisions of K-1. He is the former K-1 Lightweight champion, the former K-1 Super Featherweight champion and a two-time K-1 World Super Featherweight Grand Prix winner.

Urabe was ranked as a top ten super bantamweight kickboxer in the world by Combat Press between September 2020 and April 2023, as well as a top ten bantamweight by between April 2018 and August 2020.

== Professional kickboxing career ==
=== Super featherweight ===
Urabe made his professional kickboxing debut against Shinichiro Ishii at Krush.2 on March 14, 2009. He won the fight by a second-round technical knockout.

Urabe faced the one-time AJKF bantamweight title challenger Shota Takiya at Krush.3 on May 17, 2009. Despite the contest taking place at -60 kg, Takiya weighed in at 55.1 kg at the official weigh-ins, while Urabe came in at 59.1 kg. Urabe won the fight by unanimous decision, with all three judges scoring the bout 30–29 in his favor.

Urabe faced Toshiki Taniyama in a superfight at the 2009 K-1 Koshien FINAL 16, which took place on August 10, 2009. He won the fight by unanimous decision, with all three judges scoring every round of the bout for him.

Urabe faced Koichi Kaneda at MA Japan Kickboxing: TEKKEN in Kimitsu on September 6, 2009, in his first fight outside of Krush. He won the fight by unanimous decision. Urabe returned to Krush to face Yukinori Nagano at Krush.4 on September 22, 2009. He won the fight by split decision, after an extra fourth round was contested.

Urabe faced the 2009 RISE Super Featherweight Rookies Cup winner Fumiya Osawa at Krush-EX - Shinjuku Dog Fight on December 4, 2009. Prior to the fight taking place, Urabe left Nishiyama Dojo and began training at Team Dragon. He won the fight by a third-round knockout. Urabe faced King Kohei in his final fight at super featherweight, before moving up to lightweight, at Krush-EX - New Generation on February 19, 2010. He won the fight by unanimous decision.

=== Lightweight ===
==== Early fights ====
Urabe faced Shusuke Oishi in a non-tournament bout at the 2010 K-1 World MAX opening round event, which took place on May 2, 2010. He won the fight by unanimous decision. The ringside officials scored the first two round 10–9 in his favor, while the third round was scored 10–10 by all three judges.

Urabe faced the former two-time Martial Arts Japan Kickboxing Federation super featherweight champion Yuji Takeuchi on July 5, 2010, in the reserve bout of the 2010 K-1 World MAX tournament. He won the fight by unanimous decision.

Urabe faced the 2010 K-1 MAX Japan lightweight tournament winner Tetsuya Yamato at Krush.10 on September 20, 2010. In front of an audience of 1,800 people, he won the fight by unanimous decision, with all three judges scoring the bout 30–26 for him. Urabe knocked his opponent down in the first round with a right straight.

==== Krush First King Tournament ====
His ten-fight undefeated streak earned Urabe a place in the 2011 Krush First Generation King Tournament, held to crown the inaugural Krush Lightweight champion. Urabe faced Lee Sung-hyun in the tournament quarterfinals on January 9, 2011. The fight was ruled a unanimous decision draw after the first three rounds were contested, with all three judges scoring it an even 29–29. Urabe was awarded the unanimous decision victory following the extra fourth round.

The final two bouts of the tournament both took place on the same day, on April 30, 2011. Urabe faced the 2009 Krush Rookies tournament winner Takuya Shirahama in the semifinals and was able to overcome him by unanimous decision, with scores of 30–28, 30–27 and 30–28. He failed to capture the championship however, as he lost by majority decision to Ryuji Kajiwara in the finals.

==== K-1 MAX Japan Tournament ====
Thanks to his prior success, Urabe was place in the 2011 K-1 MAX Japan Lightweight Grand Prix, which took place on June 25, 2011. He faced the reigning RISE super featherweight champion Yuki in the tournament quarterfinals. Urabe won the fight by majority decision, with two scorecards of 29–28 and one scorecard of 29–29. He advanced to the semifinals of the one-day tournament, where he faced Tetsuya Yamato, whom he had beaten by unanimous decision nine months prior. Urabe was able to win the rematch by unanimous decision as well, with two judges scoring the bout 30–29 in his favor, while the third judge awarded him a 30–27 scorecard. Urabe once again came up short in a tournament final however, as he suffered a unanimous decision loss at the hands of Yuta Kubo.

==== First Krush Supernova Tournament ====
Urabe faced Marimo at Krush.11 on August 14, 2011. He won the fight by unanimous decision. Two days later, it was confirmed Urabe would take part in the 2011 Krush U-22 Lightweight (62.5 kg) Supernova Tournament.

Urabe faced Yuta Otaki in the opening round of the tournament on October 10, 2011. He won the fight by unanimous decision, with two judges scoring the bout 30–27 for him, while the third judge scored two of the three rounds in his favor. Urabe faced Keita Makihara in the tournament quarterfinals, which took place on the same day. He won the closely contested fight by unanimous decision, with scores of 30–29, 30–28 and 30–29.

Urabe faced Takahashi Yukimitsu at Krush.14 on December 9, 2011, in the semifinals of the Krush Supernova tournament. He won the fight by unanimous decision, with scores of 29–28, 30–29 and 30–28. Urabe advanced to the tournament finals, which took place on Krush 14, where he faced Masaaki Noiri. He lost the fight by a career-first stoppage, as he was knocked out with a flying knee in the dying seconds of the opening round.

==== Second Krush Supernova Tournament ====
Urabe took part in the 2012 Krush U-22 Lightweight (62.5 kg) Supernova Tournament and was booked to face Kengo Sonoda in the quarterfinals, which took place on September 9, 2012. He stopped Sonoda with a left straight to the body at the 2:37 minute mark of the second round. It was his first stoppage victory in three years. Urabe faced Hiroto Yamaguchi in the tournament semifinals, which likewise took place on September 9, 2012. He won the fight by unanimous decision, with two scorecards of 30–28 and one scorecard of 30–29. Urabe faced Hisaki Higashimoto in the tournament finals at Krush 24 on November 10, 2012. He won the fight by technical knockout, 27 seconds into the third round.

=== ISKA K-1 Rules champion ===
==== Lightweight World champion ====
Urabe faced Mikael Peynaud at Krush 25 on December 14, 2012. He won the fight by unanimous decision, with all three judges awarding him a 30–27 scorecard.

Urabe faced Fumiya Osawa at Krush.27 on March 20, 2013. He was disqualified in the first round, for punching after the referee had called for a break. Although he was initially only penalized two points, the referee disqualified Urabe after it became apparent that Osawa would be unable to continue fighting.

Urabe and Osawa faced each other in an immediate rematch at Krush.29 on June 16, 2013, in the semifinals of the one-day ISKA K-1 Rules World Championship tournament. He won the fight by unanimous decision, with scores of 30–26, 30–25 and 30–26. Urabe twice knocked Osawa down, with a head kick in the second round and with a left straight in the third round. He faced Xavier Bastard in the finals of the one-day tournament. Urabe won the fight by a second-round technical knockout. The bout was stopped on the advice of the ringside physician, due to cuts on both of Bastard's eyes.

Urabe faced Kimimura at Big Bang - Road to Unity 14 on September 1, 2013. He won the fight by unanimous decision, with all three judges scoring the bout 30–27 in his favor. Urabe next faced Keijiro Myakoshi at Krush.35 on December 14, 2013. He won the fight by majority decision, with scores of 29–29, 30–29 and 30–29. Urabe faced Hicham Moujtahid at Krush.39 on March 8, 2014. He won the fight by unanimous decision, with scores of 30–28, 30–28 and 30–27.

==== Super Lightweight World champion ====
Urabe challenged the ISKA Super Lightweight World K-1 Rules champion Yetkin Özkul at Best of Fight on May 1, 2014, in Guéret, France, his first fight outside of Japan. He captured the title by unanimous decision.

Urabe faced Shota PKSaenchaimuaythaigym at Krush.44 on August 9, 2014. He stopped Shota with a head kick in the finals seconds of the third round.

Urabe faced Yang Guishan at Krush.46 on October 5, 2014. He won the fight by unanimous decision, with two judges scoring the bout 30–26 for him, while the third judge had it 30–28 in his favor. Urabe knocked Guishan down in the third round.

=== Return to super featherweight ===
==== 2015 K-1 World Grand Prix ====
Urabe faced Denis Puric in the quarterfinals of the 2015 K-1 World Super Featherweight Grand Prix, which took place on January 18, 2015. He knocked Puric down with a right hook early on in the opening round and dropped him with a knee strike to the body soon after, which resulted in an automatic technical knockout victory for him under the K-1 tournament rules. Urabe advanced to the tournament semifinals, where he faced Masahiro Yamamoto. He stopped Yamamoto with a low kick at the 2:44 minute mark of the first round. Urabe faced his brother Hirotaka in the Grand Prix finals. He won the fight by unanimous decision, with all three judges scoring the bout 30–27 for him.

==== K-1 title reign ====
Urabe faced Javier Hernández in a non-title bout at K-1 World GP 2015 -55kg Championship Tournament on April 19, 2015. He won the fight by unanimous decision, with scores of 30–28, 30–29 and 30–29.

Urabe faced Konstantin Trishin in another non-title bout at K-1 World GP 2015 -70kg Championship Tournament on July 4, 2015. He won the fight by unanimous decision, with scores of 30–29, 30–28 and 30–27.

Urabe made his maiden K-1 Super Featherweight Championship defense against his brother Hirotaka Urabe at K-1 World GP 2015 The Championship on November 21, 2015. He had previously beaten Hirotaka by unanimous decision in the finals of the 2015 K-1 World Super Featherweight Grand Prix. Urabe was knocked down with a knee strike in the second round and was knocked out with another knee strike in the third round.

==== 2016 K-1 Japan Grand Prix ====
Urabe faced Kouzi in the quarterfinals of the 2016 K-1 World Super Featherweight Grand Prix, which took place on April 24, 2016. He overcame Kouzi by unanimous decision, with two scorecards of 30–28 and one scorecard of 30–29. Urabe faced the one-time Krush Super Featherweight title challenger Kotaro Shimano in the tournament semifinals. He stopped Shimano with low kicks near the beginning of the second round. Urabe faced Taiga Kawabe in the Grand Prix finals. He lost the fight by a closely contested unanimous decision, with scores of 30–29, 30–29 and 30–28.

==== 2016 K-1 World Grand Prix ====
Urabe was booked to face the former It's Showtime World -61 kg champion Karim Bennoui in the quarterfinals of the 2016 K-1 World Super Featherweight Grand Prix, which took place on September 19, 2016. He won the fight by unanimous decision. Two of the judges scored the fight 30–27 in his favor, while the third judge awarded him a 30–28 scorecard. Urabe Paulo Tebar in the semifinals of the Grand Prix. He twice knocked Tebar down in the second round, both times with a left straight, which resulted in an automatic technical victory for him 51 seconds into the round. He fought a rematch with Taiga Kawabe, who had beaten him by decision in the 2016 K-1 Japan Super Featherweight Grand Prix, in the finals. Urabe needed just 90 seconds to knock Taiga down three times and capture the tournament title.

=== Return to lightweight ===
Urabe faced Kongnapa Weerasakreck in the quarterfinals of the 2017 K-1 World Lightweight Grand Prix on February 25, 2017. He lost the fight by unanimous decision, with all three judges scoring the bout 29–28 for Kongnapa.

Urabe faced Yannick Reine at Krush.80 on September 8, 2017. He won the fight by unanimous decision, with scores of 30–28, 30–27 and 30–27. Urabe next faced Cristian Spetcu at K-1 World GP 2017 Heavyweight Championship Tournament on November 23, 2017. He won the fight by unanimous decision, with all three judges awarding him a 30–27 scorecard.

Urabe challenged the K-1 Lightweight champion Wei Rui at K-1 World GP 2018: K'FESTA.1 on March 21, 2018. He floored Rui with a straight left midway through the second round, which left the titleholder unable to rise from the canvas.

After knocking Arthur Sorsor out in a non-title bout at K-1 World GP 2018 2nd Featherweight Championship Tournament on June 17, 2018, Urabe was booked to make his first K-1 Lightweight title defense against Kenta Hayashi at K-1 World GP 2019: K'FESTA 2 on March 10, 2019. The fight was ruled a unanimous decision after the first three rounds were contested. The judges unanimously scored the fight 10–9 for Hayashi after an extra fourth round was fought.

Urabe faced Zhu Shuai at Krush.103 on July 21, 2019. He was stopped with a right cross 55 seconds into the fight.

Urabe faced the former Krush Super Lightweight champion Yuto Shinohara at K-1 World GP 2020 in Osaka on September 22, 2020. Despite being knocked down in the third round, Urabe was able to fight to a majority decision draw, with one judge scoring the fight for him. Urabe was awarded the unanimous decision after an extra fourth round was contested.

Urabe faced Hikaru Hasumi at K-1: K'Festa 4 Day 1 on March 21, 2021. He won the fight by unanimous decision, with scores of 30–29, 30–28 and 30–27.

Urabe faced Fumiya Osawa at K-1 World GP 2021 in Fukuoka on July 17, 2021. It was the fourth time that he met Osawa in his professional career, having beaten him on two previous occasions. Urabe won the fight by unanimous decision, with two scorecards of 30–29 and one scorecard of 30–28.

=== Super lightweight ===
Urabe faced Hayato Suzuki at K-1 World MAX 2024 - World Tournament Opening Round on March 20, 2024, in his return to the super lightweight (-65 kg) division. He lost the fight by unanimous decision.

On June 8, 2024, Urabe announced his retirement from competition on social media.

== Championships and accomplishments ==
=== Professional ===
- Krush
  - 2011 Krush Lightweight Championship Tournament runner-up
  - 2011 Krush U-22 Lightweight Supernova Tournament runner-up
  - 2012 Krush U-22 Lightweight Supernova Tournament winner
- K-1
  - 2011 K-1 MAX Japan Lightweight Tournament runner-up
  - 2015 K-1 World Super Featherweight Grand Prix winner
  - 2015 K-1 Super Featherweight Championship
  - 2016 K-1 Japan Super Featherweight Grand Prix runner-up
  - 2016 K-1 World Super Featherweight Grand Prix winner
  - 2018 K-1 Lightweight Championship
- International Sport Karate Association
  - 2013 ISKA K-1 Rules World Lightweight Tournament Championship
  - 2014 ISKA K-1 Rules World Super Lightweight Championship

=== Amateur ===
- Ashihara Kaikan
  - 2006 Ashihara Karate Chiba Grand Prix High School Champion
- Shin Karate
  - 96th K-2 Light Middleweight Tournament Third Place and Fighting Spirit Award
  - 97th K-2 Light Middleweight Tournament runner-up; Skill and Best Fight Award
  - 98th K-2 Light Middleweight Tournament runner-up and Best Fight Award
- K-1
  - 2008 K-1 Koshien Tournament runner-up

== Fight record ==
Kickboxing record
52 wins (13 (T)KOs), 12 losses
| Date | Result | Opponent | Event | Location | Method | Round | Time |
| 2024-03-20 | Loss | (Japan) Hayato Suzuki | K-1 World MAX 2024 - World Tournament Opening Round | Tokyo, Japan | Decision (unanimous) | 3 | 3:00 |
| 2021-07-17 | Win | (Japan) Fumiya Osawa | K-1 World GP 2021 in Fukuoka | Fukuoka, Japan | Decision (unanimous) | 3 | 3:00 |
| 2021-03-21 | Win | (Japan) Hikaru Hasumi | K-1: K'Festa 4 Day 1 | Tokyo, Japan | Decision (unanimous) | 3 | 3:00 |
| 2020-09-22 | Win | (Japan) Yuto Shinohara | K-1 World GP 2020 in Osaka | Osaka, Japan | Ext.R decision (unanimous) | 4 | 3:00 |
| 2019-07-21 | Loss | (China) Zhu Shuai | Krush.103 | Tokyo, Japan | KO (right cross) | 1 | 0:55 |
| 2019-03-10 | Loss | (Japan) Kenta Hayashi | K-1 World GP 2019: K'FESTA 2 | Saitama, Japan | Ex.R decision (unanimous) | 4 | 3:00 |
Loses the K-1 Lightweight (62.5 kg) Championship.
| 2018-06-17 | Win | (United States) Arthur Sorsor | K-1 World GP 2018 2nd Featherweight Championship Tournament | Saitama, Japan | KO (left high knee) | 2 | 0:46 |
| 2018-03-21 | Win | (China) Wei Rui | K-1 World GP 2018: K'FESTA.1 | Saitama, Japan | KO (straight left) | 2 | 1:12 |
Wins the K-1 Lightweight (62.5 kg) Championship.
| 2017-11-23 | Win | (Romania) Cristian Spetcu | K-1 World GP 2017 Heavyweight Championship Tournament | Tokyo, Japan | Decision (unanimous) | 3 | 3:00 |
| 2017-09-08 | Win | (France) Yannick Reine | Krush.80 | Tokyo, Japan | Decision (unanimous) | 3 | 3:00 |
| 2017-02-25 | Loss | (Thailand) Kongnapa Weerasakreck | K-1 World GP 2017 Lightweight Championship Tournament, Quarter Finals | Tokyo, Japan | Decision (unanimous) | 3 | 3:00 |
| 2016-09-19 | Win | (Japan) Taiga | K-1 World GP 2016 -60kg World Tournament, Final | Tokyo, Japan | KO (3 knockdowns/left cross) | 1 | 1:30 |
Wins the 2016 K-1 Super Featherweight (60 kg) World Grand Prix
| 2016-09-19 | Win | (Brazil) Paulo Tebar | K-1 World GP 2016 -60kg World Tournament, Semi Finals | Tokyo, Japan | TKO (punches) | 2 | 0:58 |
| 2016-09-19 | Win | (France) Karim Bennoui | K-1 World GP 2016 -60kg World Tournament, Quarter Finals | Tokyo, Japan | Decision (unanimous) | 3 | 3:00 |
| 2016-04-24 | Loss | (Japan) Taiga | K-1 World GP 2016 -60kg Japan Tournament, Final | Tokyo, Japan | Decision (unanimous) | 3 | 3:00 |
For the 2016 K-1 Japan Super Featherweight (60 kg) Grand Prix title.
| 2016-04-24 | Win | (Japan) Kotaro Shimano | K-1 World GP 2016 -60kg Japan Tournament, Semi Finals | Tokyo, Japan | KO (left low kicks) | 2 | 0:51 |
| 2016-04-24 | Win | (Japan) Koji | K-1 World GP 2016 -60kg Japan Tournament, Quarter Finals | Tokyo, Japan | Decision (unanimous) | 3 | 3:00 |
| 2016-02-05 | Win | (France) Alexy Wallace | Krush.63 | Tokyo, Japan | Decision (unanimous) | 3 | 3:00 |
| 2015-11-21 | Loss | (Japan) Hirotaka Urabe | K-1 World GP 2015 The Championship | Tokyo, Japan | KO (right high knee) | 3 | 2:13 |
Loses the K-1 Super Featherweight (60 kg) Championship.
| 2015-08-28 | Win | (China) Kang En | Hero Legends | China | Decision (unanimous) | 3 | 3:00 |
| 2015-07-04 | Win | (Ukraine) Konstantin Trishin | K-1 World GP 2015 -70kg Championship Tournament, Superfight | Tokyo, Japan | Decision (unanimous) | 3 | 3:00 |
| 2015-04-19 | Win | (Spain) Javier Hernández | K-1 World GP 2015 -55kg Championship Tournament, Superfight | Tokyo, Japan | Decision (unanimous) | 3 | 3:00 |
| 2015-01-18 | Win | (Japan) Hirotaka Urabe | K-1 World GP 2015 -60kg Championship Tournament, Final | Shibuya, Tokyo, Japan | Decision (unanimous) | 3 | 3:00 |
Wins the K-1 Super Featherweight (60 kg) Championship.
| 2015-01-18 | Win | (Japan) Masahiro Yamamoto | K-1 World GP 2015 -60kg Championship Tournament, Semi Finals | Shibuya, Tokyo, Japan | KO (left low kick) | 1 | 2:44 |
| 2015-01-18 | Win | (Canada) Denis Puric | K-1 World GP 2015 -60kg Championship Tournament, Quarter Finals | Shibuya, Tokyo, Japan | TKO (left knee to the body) | 1 | 2:05 |
| 2014-11-22 | Loss | (France) Karim Bennoui | La 21ème Nuit des Champions | Marseille, France | Decision (split) | 5 | 3:00 |
For La Nuit des Champions K-1 -62kg title.
| 2014-10-05 | Win | (China) Yang Guishan | Krush.46 | Tokyo, Japan | Decision (unanimous) | 3 | 2:50 |
| 2014-08-09 | Win | (Japan) Shota PKSaenchaimuaythaigym | Krush.44 | Tokyo, Japan | TKO (left high kick) | 3 | 2:50 |
| 2014-05-01 | Win | (Turkey) Yetkin Özkul | Best of Fight | Guéret, France | Decision (unanimous) | 5 | 3:00 |
Wins the ISKA Super Lightweight (65 kg) World K-1 Rules Championship.
| 2014-03-08 | Win | (Belgium) Hicham Moujtahid | Krush.39 | Tokyo, Japan | Decision (unanimous) | 3 | 3:00 |
| 2013-12-14 | Win | (Japan) Keijiro Myakoshi | Krush.35 | Tokyo, Japan | Decision (majority) | 3 | 3:00 |
| 2013-09-01 | Win | (Japan) Kimimura | Big Bang - Road to Unity 14 | Tokyo, Japan | Decision (unanimous) | 3 | 3:00 |
| 2013-06-16 | Win | (France) Xavier Bastard | Krush.29 ISKA K-1 World Lightweight Tournament, Final | Tokyo, Japan | TKO (doctor stoppage/cut) | 2 | 0:30 |
Wins the ISKA Lightweight (62.5 kg) World K-1 Rules Championship.
| 2013-06-16 | Win | (Japan) Fumiya Osawa | Krush.29 ISKA K-1 World Lightweight Tournament, Semi Finals | Tokyo, Japan | Decision (unanimous) | 3 | 3:00 |
| 2013-03-20 | Loss | (Japan) Fumiya Osawa | Krush.27 | Tokyo, Japan | Disqualification | 1 | |
| 2012-12-14 | Win | (France) Mikael Peynaud | Krush.25 | Tokyo, Japan | Decision (unanimous) | 3 | 3:00 |
| 2012-11-10 | Win | (Japan) Hisaki Higashimoto | Krush.24 YOUTH GP 2011 –63 kg Tournament, Final | Tokyo, Japan | KO (punches & knee) | 3 | 0:27 |
Wins the 2012 Krush U-22 Lightweight (62.5 kg) Supernova Tournament.
| 2012-09-09 | Win | (Japan) Hiroto Yamaguchi | Krush YOUTH GP 2011 –63 kg Tournament, Semi Finals | Tokyo, Japan | Decision (unanimous) | 3 | 3:00 |
| 2012-09-09 | Win | (Japan) Kengo Sonoda | Krush YOUTH GP 2012 –63 kg Tournament, Quarter Finals | Tokyo, Japan | KO (left body cross) | 2 | 2:37 |
| 2012-07-14 | Win | (Japan) Ryukei | Krush-EX 2012 vol.4 | Tokyo, Japan | Decision (unanimous) | 3 | 3:00 |
| 2012-06-03 | Win | (Japan) Hiroki Nakamura | Big Bang | Tokyo, Japan | Decision (unanimous) | 3 | 3:00 |
| 2012-04-29 | Loss | (Japan) Keijiro Miyakoshi | New Japan Kickboxing Federation | Tokyo, Japan | Decision (majority) | 3 | 3:00 |
| 2012-03-17 | Win | (Japan) Kizaemon Saiga | Krush.17 | Tokyo, Japan | Decision (majority) | 3 | 3:00 |
| 2011-12-09 | Loss | (Japan) Masaaki Noiri | Krush.14 YOUTH GP 2011 –63 kg Tournament Final | Tokyo, Japan | KO (left flying knee) | 1 | 2:58 |
For the 2011 Krush U-22 Lightweight (62.5 kg) Supernova Tournament title.
| 2011-12-09 | Win | (Japan) Takahashi Yukimitsu | Krush.14 YOUTH GP 2011 –63 kg Tournament Final 4 | Tokyo, Japan | Decision (unanimous) | 3 | 3:00 |
| 2011-10-10 | Win | (Japan) Keita Makihira | Krush YOUTH GP 2011 –63 kg Tournament Final 8 | Tokyo, Japan | Decision (unanimous) | 3 | 3:00 |
| 2011-10-10 | Win | (Japan) Yuta Otaki | Krush YOUTH GP 2011 –63 kg Tournament Final 16 | Tokyo, Japan | Decision (unanimous) | 3 | 3:00 |
| 2011-08-14 | Win | (Japan) Marimo | Krush.11 | Tokyo, Japan | Decision (unanimous) | 3 | 3:00 |
| 2011-06-25 | Loss | (Japan) Yuta Kubo | K-1 World MAX 2011 –63 kg Japan Tournament Final, Final | Tokyo, Japan | Decision (unanimous) | 3 | 3:00 |
For the 2011 K-1 MAX Japan -63kg Tournament title.
| 2011-06-25 | Win | (Japan) Tetsuya Yamato | K-1 World MAX 2011 –63 kg Japan Tournament Final, Semi Finals | Tokyo, Japan | Decision (unanimous) | 3 | 3:00 |
| 2011-06-25 | Win | (Japan) Yuki | K-1 World MAX 2011 –63 kg Japan Tournament Final, Quarter Finals | Tokyo, Japan | Decision (majority) | 3 | 3:00 |
| 2011-04-30 | Loss | (Japan) Ryuji Kajiwara | Krush First Generation King Tournament Round, Final | Tokyo, Japan | Decision (majority) | 3 | 3:00 |
For the Krush Lightweight (62.5 kg) Championship
| 2011-04-30 | Win | (Japan) Takuya Shirahama | Krush First Generation King Tournament Round, Semi Finals | Tokyo, Japan | Decision (unanimous) | 3 | 3:00 |
| 2011-01-09 | Win | (South Korea) Lee Sung-hyun | Krush First Generation King Tournament Round 2, Quarter Finals | Tokyo, Japan | Ext.R decision (unanimous) | 4 | 3:00 |
| 2010-09-20 | Win | (Japan) Tetsuya Yamato | GoodLoser "Krush.10" | Bunkyo, Tokyo, Japan | Decision (unanimous) | 3 | 3:00 |
| 2010-07-05 | Win | (Japan) Yuji Takeuchi | K - 1 WORLD MAX 2010 – 63 kg Japan Tournament Reserve Fight | Tokyo, Japan | Decision (unanimous) | 3 | 3:00 |
| 2010-05-02 | Win | (Japan) Shusuke Oishi | K - 1 WORLD MAX 2010 – 63 kg Japan Tournament First Round | Tokyo, Japan | Decision (unanimous) | 3 | 3:00 |
| 2010-02-19 | Win | (Japan) King Kohei | Krush-EX - New Generation | Tokyo, Japan | Decision (unanimous) | 3 | 3:00 |
| 2009-12-04 | Win | (Japan) Fumiya Osawa | Krush-EX - Shinjuku Dog Fight | Tokyo, Japan | KO (left high knee) | 3 | 1:24 |
| 2009-09-22 | Win | (Japan) Yukinori Nagano | Krush.4 | Tokyo, Japan | Ext.R decision (split) | 3 | 3:00 |
| 2009-09-06 | Win | (Japan) Koichi Kaneda | MA Japan Kickboxing: TEKKEN in Kimitsu | Tokyo, Japan | Decision (unanimous) | 3 | 3:00 |
| 2009-08-10 | Win | (Japan) Toshiki Taniyama | K-1 Koshien FINAL 16 - Superfight | Tokyo, Japan | Decision (unanimous) | 3 | 3:00 |
| 2009-05-17 | Win | (Japan) Shota Takiya | Krush.3 | Tokyo, Japan | Decision (unanimous) | 3 | 3:00 |
| 2009-03-14 | Win | (Japan) Shinichiro Ishii | Krush.2 | Tokyo, Japan | TKO (doctor stoppage) | 2 | 1:18 |
Legend: Win Loss Draw/no contest Notes

Amateur kickboxing record
| Date | Result | Opponent | Event | Location | Method | Round | Time |
|---|---|---|---|---|---|---|---|
| 2008-12-31 | Loss | (Japan) Hiroya | Dynamite!! 2008 K-1 Koshien 2008 King of Under 18 Tournament Final | Saitama, Japan | Ext.R decision | 4 | 3:00 |
For the K-1 Koshien 2008 King of Under 18 Tournament title.
| 2008-12-31 | Win | (Japan) Ryuya Kusakabe | Dynamite!! 2008 K-1 Koshien 2008 King of Under 18 Tournament Semi Finals | Saitama, Japan | TKO (doctor stoppage) | 3 | 2:29 |
| 2008-10-01 | Win | (Japan) Yusuke Tsuboi | K-1 World MAX 2008 World Championship Tournament Final Koshien King of Under 18 Tournament Quarter Finals | Tokyo, Japan | TKO (corner stoppage) | 3 | 0:54 |
| 2008-08-29 | Win | (Japan) Kyohei Hayashi | K-1 Koshien KING OF UNDER 18 〜FINAL16〜 | Tokyo, Japan | Decision (unanimous) | 3 | 3:00 |
| 2008-07-21 | Win | (Japan) Daizo Sasaki | K-1 Koshien KING OF UNDER 18 Kanto Area Selection Tournament, Final | Tokyo, Japan | Decision (unanimous) | 1 | 2:00 |
| 2008-07-21 | Win | (Japan) Ryo Murakoshi | K-1 Koshien KING OF UNDER 18 Kanto Area Selection Tournament, Semi Final | Tokyo, Japan | Decision (unanimous) | 1 | 2:00 |
| 2008-07-21 | Win | (Japan) Yusuke Takai | K-1 Koshien KING OF UNDER 18 Kanto Area Selection Tournament, Quarter Final | Tokyo, Japan | Decision (unanimous) | 1 | 2:00 |
| 2008-07-21 | Win | (Japan) Takuya Kondo | K-1 Koshien KING OF UNDER 18 Kanto Area Selection Tournament, First Round | Tokyo, Japan | Decision (unanimous) | 1 | 2:00 |
Legend: Win Loss Draw/no contest Notes

== See also ==
- List of male kickboxers
- List of K-1 champions
