= Javier Hernández (kickboxer) =

Spanish kickboxer (born 1989)

Javier Hernandez Navarro
- Born: 2 November 1989 (age 36); Spain
- Other names: El Tigre de Villarubia
- Height: 1.65 m (5 ft 5 in)
- Weight: 61 kg (134 lb; 9.6 st)
- Division: Lightweight
- Style: Kickboxing, boxing
- Stance: Orthodox
- Fighting out of: Córdoba, Spain
- Team: Tiger Team
- Trainer: Javier Hernández Navarro
- Years active: 2008-present

Kickboxing record
- Total: 58
- Wins: 47
- By knockout: 27
- Losses: 11
- By knockout: 4
- Draws: 0

Javier Hernandez (born 2 November 1989) is a retired Spanish lightweight kickboxer. He is a former Wu Lin Feng -60 kg World Champion and former It's Showtime 61MAX champion.

As of November 2012, Hernandez was ranked the #7 lightweight in the world by LiverKick.com.

== Biography and career ==
Growing up fighting on the Spanish scene Hernandez had a successful amateur record winning the national title in 2008 and winning a bronze and silver medal in full-contact and K-1 rules at the W.P.K.A. world championships, held at the end of the year. He also had a number of professional fights that year, culminating by winning the Iberian pro belt. In 2009 Hernandez won his first professional international title by becoming the I.S.K.A. inter-continental champion.

These victories still left Javier virtually unheard of outside of Spain and this was echoed when he was announced as the challenger to 61MAX world champion Karim Bennoui for the first ever It's Showtime event to be held in Spain in June 2011.

While relatively unknown abroad, Hernandez was announced as the challenger to 61MAX world champion Karim Bennoui in June 2011, for the It's Showtime promotion. While a heavy underdog, Hernandez succeeded in achieving a unanimous decision victory after five rounds, becoming the new champion.

Hernandez subsequently lost to Yuki by KO due to lowkicks in round two at RISE 90 in Tokyo, Japan on 25 October 2012. Later, he beat Mickael Peynaud by decision at Heroes IV in Cordoba, Spain on 17 November 2012.

== Titles and accomplishments ==
Professional

- Wu Lin Feng
  - 2017 Wu Lin Feng -60 kg World Champion
- It's Showtime
  - 2011 It's Showtime 61MAX World Champion
- International Sport Karate Association
  - 2009 I.S.K.A. K-1 Inter-continental -64.5 kg Champion
- Federación Española de Kickboxing
  - 2009 F.E.K. K-1 Spanish Champion
  - 2008 F.E.K. K--1 Iberian champion

Amateur

- 2008 W.P.K.A. World Championships in Limassol, Cyprus (silver) (K-1 rules)
- 2008 W.P.K.A. World Championships in Limassol, Cyprus (bronze) (full-contact)
- 2008 F.E.K. Spanish national champion (K-1 rules)

== Kickboxing record ==
Pro kickboxing record
47 wins (27 (T)KOs), 11 losses
Date	Result	Opponent	Event	Location	Method	Round	Time
2018-03-10	Loss	(China) Zhao Chongyang	Wu Lin Feng 2018: -60kg World Championship Tournament, Semi Finals	Jiaozuo, China	TKO (forfeit)	1	
2018-03-10	Win	(China) Wang Junyu	Wu Lin Feng 2018: -60kg World Championship Tournament, Quarter Finals	Jiaozuo, China	Ext.R decision (unanimous)	4	3:00
2017-05-06	Win	(Japan) Hirotaka Asahisa	Wu Lin Feng 2017: 60 kg World Tournament, Final	Zhengzhou, China	Ext.R decision (unanimous)	4	3:00
Wins the vacant Wu Lin Feng -60 kg World title.
2017-05-06	Win	(China) Wang Junyu	Wu Lin Feng 2017: 60 kg World Tournament, Semifinals	Zhengzhou, China	Decision (unanimous)	3	3:00
2017-04-01	Win	(Thailand) Kunbut	Wu Lin Feng 60 kg World Tournament Group D Final	China	KO	3	
2017-04-01	Win	(China) Feng Liang	Wu Lin Feng 60 kg World Tournament Group D Semifinal 1	China	Decision (unanimous)	3	3:00
2016-09-19	Loss	(Japan) Taiga	K-1 World GP 2016 -60kg World Tournament, quarterfinals	Tokyo, Japan	TKO (retirement)	2	3:00
2016-04-19	Win	(Italy) Calogero Palmeri			KO (low kick)	2	0:34
2015-11-14	Loss	(France) Karim Bennoui	La 22ème Nuit Des Champions	Francia	Decision (unanimous)	5	3:00
2015-09-12	Win	(Australia) Michael Thompson	The Circle 1	Barcelona, Spain	Decision (unanimous)	3	3:00
2015-07-04	Loss	(China) Deng Zeqi	Wu Lin Feng	China	Decision (unanimous)	3	3:00
2015-04-19	Loss	(Japan) Koya Urabe	K-1 World GP 2015 -55kg Championship Tournament	Tokyo, Japan	Decision (unanimous)	3	3:00
2015-01-18	Loss	(Japan) Hirotaka Urabe	K-1 World GP 2015 -60kg Championship Tournament, semifinals	Tokyo, Japan	Extra round decision	4	3:00
2015-01-18	Win	(Japan) Kotaro Shimano	K-1 World GP 2015 -60kg Championship Tournament, quarterfinals	Tokyo, Japan	Decision	3	3:00
2014-11-22	Win	(France) Thomas Adamandopoulos	La 21ème Nuit des Champions	Marseille, France	TKO	5	3:00
2014-10-05	Win	(Spain) German Tabuenca	Armados y Peligrosos VIII	Barcelona, Spain	Decision	3	3:00
2014-09-08	Win	(Portugal) Bruno Almeida	Todos con Rafa Fuentes	Cordoba, Spain	Decision	3	3:00
2014-03-15	Win	(Portugal) Rui Brucenio	Heroes Sevilla 3	Sevilla, Spain	KO	2	
2013-28-09	Loss	(France) Modibo Diarra	TK2 World Max	Marseille, France	Decision	3	3:00
2013-03-16	Draw	(Netherlands) Hamza Essalih	El Desafio k1	Málaga, Spain	Decision	3	3:00
2012-11-17	Win	(France) Mickael Peynaud	Heroes IV	Cordoba, Spain	Decision	3	3:00
2012-10-25	Loss	(Japan) Yuki	RISE 90	Tokyo, Japan	KO (low kick)	2	2:03
2012-07-21	Loss	(Japan) Masahiro Yamamoto	It's Showtime 59	Arona, Spain	Decision (unanimous)	5	3:00
Lost It's Showtime 61MAX world title -61 kg.
2012-05-13	Win	(Spain) Carlos Chiquitín Reyes	El Desafio	Santa Cruz de Tenerife, Spain	Decision	3	3:00
2012-04-07	Loss	(Portugal) Ruben Almeida	Ring of Glory	Mafra, Portugal	Decision (majority)	5	3:00
For W.A.K.O. Pro K1 world title -62.2 kg.
2011-11-19	Win	(Portugal) Ruben Almeida	Heroes III	Cordoba, Spain	Decision	3	3:00
2011-06-18	Win	(France) Karim Bennoui	It's Showtime 2011 Madrid	Madrid, Spain	Decision (unanimous)	5	3:00
Wins Bennoui's It's Showtime 61MAX world title -61 kg.
2011-04-09	Loss	(Spain) Carlos Chiquitín Reyes	Segunda Velada Peleas	Santa Cruz de Tenerife, Spain	Decision (majority)	5	2:00
2011-03-13	Win	(Spain) German Tabuenca	Armados y Peligrosos VI	Barcelona, Spain	Decision	5	2:00
2010-04-24	Win	(Portugal) Nuno Correia	K-1 Santaella	Córdoba, Spain	KO (punches)	3	
2009-07-19	Win	(Argentina) Leon Brest	Battle of Estepona	Estepona, Spain	Decision (unanimous)	5	3:00
Wins I.S.K.A. K-1 rules inter-continental title -64.5 kg.
2008-07-19	Loss	(England) Andy Thrasher	I.S.K.A. Event	Santa Cruz de Tenerife, Spain	KO	3	
Legend: Win Loss Draw/no contest Notes

== See also ==
- List of It's Showtime events
- List of It's Showtime champions
- List of male kickboxers
