= Xavier Bastard =

French male Muay Thai fighter (born 1984)

- Born: 25 August 1984 (age 42); Seoul, South Korea
- Nationality: French
- Height: 1.70 m (5 ft 7 in)
- Weight: 57–62 kg (126–137 lb; 9 st 0 lb – 9 st 11 lb)
- Division: Lightweight
- Style: Muay Thai, Kickboxing, K-1
- Fighting out of: Vannes, France
- Team: Kaeng Studio Sport
- Years active: 2006–2022

Kickboxing record
- Total: 88
- Wins: 51
- By knockout: 11
- Losses: 34
- Draws: 2
- No contests: 1

Xavier Bastard (born 25 August 1984) is a French former professional Muay Thai fighter who also competed in Kickboxing and under K-1 rules. He is a former WPMF World and Intercontinental Lightweight champion.

== Early life and training ==
Bastard began practicing Muay Thai at the age of 16 at AS Cobra, a French combat sports association, where he was trained by Fred Dejonghe.

== Muay Thai and kickboxing career ==
Bastard began his professional career in the mid-2000s, primarily competing under traditional Muay Thai rules in France and internationally. Over the course of his career, he also took part in kickboxing and K-1 rules competitions.

In 2011, Bastard challenged Apisit Koedchatturat for the WPMF World Lightweight title, losing by unanimous decision. Later that year, he captured the WPMF Intercontinental Lightweight title. In January 2012, he won the WPMF World Lightweight title by unanimous decision against Rob Storey.

Bastard also competed internationally under K-1 rules, notably in Japan, where he participated in the Krush promotion. In 2013, he reached the finals of the Krush 29 tournament for the ISKA World Lightweight title, losing by technical knockout to Koya Urabe.

After a three-year absence from competition, Bastard returned to the ring in June 2018. He continued to compete until 2022, recording his final professional victory at United Fight Night in Brest, France.

== Coaching career ==
From 2016 onward, Bastard combined his professional fighting career with coaching. He became a Muay Thai coach at Kaeng Studio Sport, a gym based in Vannes, France, where he teaches Muay Thai to amateur and competitive fighters.

== Championships and accomplishments ==
- 2012 WPMF World Lightweight Champion
- 2011 WPMF Intercontinental Lightweight Champion

== Professional record ==
Professional record
Date	Result	Opponent	Event	Location	Discipline	Method	Round	Time
Record includes bouts contested under Muay Thai and K-1 rules. Primary source: MuayThaiTV.
2022-04-22	Win	(Italy) Samuel Iorio	United Fight Night	Brest, France	Muay Thai	Decision	3	3:00
2020-01-17	Win	(Romania) Marian-Florin Soare	Ultimate Fight Night	Brest, France	Muay Thai	Decision	3	3:00
2018-10-06	Loss	(France) Celestin Mendes	Challenge	Saint-Amand-les-Eaux, France	K-1	Decision	3	3:00
2018-06-16	Loss	(Thailand) Khunsuknoi Sitkaewprapon	Best Of Bretagne	Brest, France	Muay Thai	Decision	3	3:00
2015-05-23	Loss	(France) Arthur Meyer	Radikal Fight Night 3	Charleville-Mézières, France	Muay Thai	Decision	3	3:00
2015-04-11	Loss	(Italy) Giuseppe Lavecchia	La Nuit du Fight	Vannes, France	Muay Thai	KO	5	
2014-12-04	Loss	(Thailand) Unknown opponent	King's Birthday	Pattaya, Thailand	Muay Thai	TKO (doctor stoppage)	2	
2014-11-22	Draw	(France) Ayoub El Khaidar	Défi Boxe Thaï	Morlaix, France	Muay Thai	Draw		
2014-05-01	Draw	(Japan) Hirotaka Urabe	Best of Fight	Guéret, France	K-1	Draw		
2014-04-05	Win	(Italy) Luca Gigliotti	Oktagon	Assago, Italy	Muay Thai	Decision	3	3:00
2013-11-23	Loss	(France) Thomas Adamandopoulos	Nuit des Champions 2013	Marseille, France	K-1	Decision	3	3:00
2013-06-16	Loss	(Japan) Koya Urabe	Krush 29	Tokyo, Japan	K-1	TKO (doctor stoppage)	2	
2013-06-16	Win	(Japan) Naoki Ishikawa (kickboxer)	Krush 29	Tokyo, Japan	K-1	TKO	3	
2013-05-25	Win	(France) Gabriel Moreno	Final Fight	Bagnols-sur-Cèze, France	Muay Thai	KO	2	
2013-04-20	Win	(France) Arnaud Charrier	Trophées de l'Iroise	Locmaria-Plouzané, France	K-1	Decision		
2013-03-09	Draw	(Russia) Umar Paskhaev	Nuit des Champions 10	Dinard, France	K-1	Draw	3	3:00
2013-01-12	Win	(Italy) Daniel Saporito	La Nuit du Fight	Vannes, France	Muay Thai	KO	2	
2012-10-08	Loss	(Japan) Hirotaka Urabe	Krush 23	Tokyo, Japan	K-1	TKO	4	
2012-05-19	Win	(Poland) Bartosz Batra	Gala Muay Thai – Polska vs Francja	Pruszków, Poland	Muay Thai	Decision	3	3:00
2012-04-14	Win	(France) Adrien Gref	Gala de Saumur	Saumur, France	Muay Thai	Decision	3	3:00
2012-01-21	Win	(United Kingdom) Rob Storey	Championnat du monde WPMF	Vannes, France	Muay Thai	Decision	5	3:00
2011-05-14	Loss	(Thailand) Apisit Koedchatturat	Le défi des jardins de Brocéliande	Montfort-sur-Meu, France	Muay Thai	Decision	5	3:00
2011-04-02	Win	(United Kingdom) Rob Storey	Explosion Fight Night Vol.3	Brest, France	K-1	Majority decision	5	3:00
2011-03-12	Win	(France) Sofiane Bougossa	8ème Nuit des Champions	Dinard, France	Muay Thai	Decision	3	3:00
2011-01-15	Loss	(Thailand) Apisit Koedchatturat	Muay Thaï à Vannes	Vannes, France	Muay Thai	Decision		
2010-11-29	Loss	(Thailand) Yodkriangkrai Kiat Thor.Bor.	Rajadamnern Stadium	Bangkok, Thailand	Muay Thai	Decision		
2010-11-14	Win	(Belgium) Nico Verresen	International Thai Boxing & MMA Gala	Lint, Belgium	Muay Thai	KO	3	
2010-07-23	Win	(Thailand) Arnon Yucharden	Championnat du monde	Saint-Denis, Réunion, France	Muay Thai	Decision		
2010-06-05	Loss	(France) Karim Bennoui	La Nuit des Challenges 8	Saint-Fons, France	Muay Thai	TKO	3	
2010-04-03	Loss	(France) Eric Renon	Finales du championnat de France	Paris, France	Muay Thai	Decision		
2010-02-26	Loss	(Thailand) Nerkiri Sitsamortong	Lumpinee Stadium	Bangkok, Thailand	Muay Thai	Decision		
2009-11-28	Loss	(France) Eric Renon	Gala de boxe thaï	Rennes, France	Muay Thai	Decision		
2009-05-16	Loss	(Thailand) Kongnakornbarn Sor Kitrungroj	Opération Muay Thai 2	Schiltigheim, France	Muay Thai	TKO	3	
2009-04-11	Loss	(France) Cedric Panizzi	La Nuit des Boxeurs Thaï	Brest, France	Muay Thai	TKO (doctor stoppage)	3	
2009-02-07	Loss	(France) Albert Veera Chey	Gala de boxe thaï de Saumur	Saumur, France	Muay Thai	KO	3	
2009-01-17	Win	(Laos) Vatsana Sedone	Muay Thaï à Vannes	Vannes, France	Muay Thai	Decision		
2008-12-23	Win	(Thailand) Unknown opponent	Rangsit Stadium	Bangkok, Thailand	Muay Thai	Decision		
2008-12-06	Loss	(France) Yetkin Ozkul	Les Chocs de Légendes II	Saint-Ouen, France	Muay Thai	TKO	1	
2008-06-22	Loss	(United Kingdom) Rob Storey	Capital Punishment	London, United Kingdom	Muay Thai	Decision		
2008-06-14	Loss	(France) Mustapha Bensihmed	Les Guerriers du Ring II	Marcq-en-Barœul, France	Muay Thai	Decision		
2008-04-26	Loss	(France) Yetkin Ozkul	Gala de boxe thaï et pancrace	Bayonne, France	Muay Thai	Decision		
2007-06-30	Loss	(France) Mounir Boutei	La Nuit des Gladiateurs	Fontenay-sous-Bois, France	Muay Thai	Decision		
2007-06-02	Loss	(France) Mustapha Bensihmed	Les Guerriers du Ring	Marcq-en-Barœul, France	Muay Thai	KO	1	
2007-05-19	Loss	(France) Mathieu Couderc	Muay-thaï solidarité avec le Niger	Athis-Mons, France	Muay Thai	Decision		
2007-01-20	Win	(France) Anthony Etchevrry	Gala de muay-thaï à Vannes	Vannes, France	Muay Thai	Decision		
2006-12-16	Win	(France) Guillaume Mautz	Super Fight Muay Thai	Bordeaux, France	Muay Thai	TKO (three knockdowns)	3	

|}

== See also ==
- List of male kickboxers
