= Yetkin Özkul =

Turkish kickboxer

- Born: July 6, 1986 (age 40); Akdeniz, Turkey
- Other names: Turkish Dynamite
- Nationality: Turkish
- Height: 1.68 m (5 ft 6 in)
- Weight: 61.2 kg (135 lb; 9.64 st)
- Division: Featherweight; Lightweight
- Style: Muay Thai, Taekwondo
- Stance: Orthodox
- Fighting out of: Paris, France
- Team: RM Boxing
- Trainer: Rachid Saadi
- Rank: black belt in Taekwondo
- Years active: 2003-present

Kickboxing record
- Total: 84
- Wins: 68
- By knockout: 30
- Losses: 16
- Draws: 0

Amateur record
- Total: 115
- Wins: 96
- By knockout: 35
- Losses: 15
- Draws: 4
- Last updated on: June 14, 2014

Yetkin Özkul
Medal record

Representing Turkey

Men's Muay Thai

WMF World Championships
Bronze medal – third place	Bangkok 2004	-57 kg

Yetkin Özkul (born July 6, 1986) is a Turkish Muay Thai kickboxer who competes in the featherweight and lightweight divisions. After beginning his martial arts training in taekwondo, he switched to kickboxing and Muay Thai and won a bronze medal at the 2004 WMF World Championships.

== Early life ==
Yetkin Özkul was born in Akdeniz, Turkey and started taekwondo at the age of twelve, eventually earning his black belt. After taking up kickboxing and then Muay Thai, he moved to Amsterdam, Netherlands in 2005 to continue his career but a year later relocated to Paris, France and the RM Boxing gym.

== Career ==
Özkul had an extensive amateur career, compiling a record 96-15-4 with 35 knockouts and representing Turkey at the 2004 WMF World Championships in Bangkok, Thailand where he picked up a bronze medal in the -57 kg/125 lb division. He was a two-time national champion of Turkey, once under Muay Thai rules and once in kickboxing, but did not come to prominence on the international scene until his relocation to France. He won the French Muay Thai title at -60 kg/132 lb in Biarritz, France, in April 2008 by defeating Xavier Bastard on points. Özkul took the first two rounds and forced a standing eight count on Bastard early in the first only for Bastard to rally back and take the third and fourth, thus making round five decisive. Bastard was docked a point in the final round for a low blow and Özkul took the judges' decision and the belt.

He was set to fight Rob Storey for the European title in England on June 26, 2008, but he was unable to enter the country due to visa issues and was replaced by Xavier Bastard. Özkul and Bastard rematched in Paris on December 6, 2008, with the Turk scoring an early right hook knockdown followed up by a barrage of unanswered punches to force a first round technical knockout and retain the French title.

Despite having beaten a number of Thai opponents previously, Özkul took a huge step up in class when he faced Saenchai Sor. Kingstar at the S-8 Thaiboxing event in Wuppertal, Germany, on April 3, 2010. In round two of the bout, Saenchai's pedigree began to show as he stunned Özkul with a high kick before dropping him with a left hook. He beat the referee's count only to be sent to the canvas again when the Thai great caught his kick and countered with a left cross which rendered him unable to continue. He faced another top Thai in the form of Rungravee Sasiprapa in Paris on October 29, 2010, losing a close majority decision in a back-and-forth, punch-heavy affair. The pair were set to rematch at M-One: Thailand vs. America in Los Angeles, California, United States on October 21, 2011 but Özkul was replaced by Andres Martinez for undisclosed reasons.

On November 5, 2011, Yetkin Özkul won the eight man -59 kg/130 lb tournament at Super Showdown 2 in Clydebank, Scotland. He made quick work of Darren O'Connor in the quarter-finals, flooring him three times en route to a TKO win, before outpointing Jose Varela in the semis. He then knocked out Ilias el Hajoui with a ferocious left hook inside the first round of the final.

The Yetkin Özkul-Rungravee Sasiprapa rematch finally came to fruition at Le Choc des Légendes in Paris on March 10, 2012, with the Turk getting his revenge by winning on points. He faced another familiar foe the following month when he again knocked out Ilias el Hajoui in the first round to claim the A1 World Combat Cup -61 kg/134 lb strap in Eindhoven, Netherlands.

In his second title fight in as many months, he TKO'd Thomas Adamandopoulos in the fourth round to win the ISKA World Super Lightweight (-62.3 kg/137.3 lb) Oriental Championship at Urban Boxing United in Marseille, France, on May 19, 2012.

Özkul challenged Jomthong Chuwattana for his WBC Muaythai World Lightweight (-61.235 kg/135 lb) title at Battle for the Belts in Bangkok on June 9, 2012, losing out by unanimous decision as Jomthong was able to his height and technical skills to keep him at bay for the duration of the fight. Despite this setback, he was still ranked at #5 when the world lightweight rankings were first published by LiverKick in September 2012.

He moved up in weight to -63 kg/138 lb to take on world #1 Masaaki Noiri under Oriental rules at Krush.24 in Tokyo, Japan on November 10, 2012. After a close first two rounds, Özkul was dropped with a flying knee from Noiri in the third and final, resigning him to a unanimous decision loss. He took to the ring again two weeks later to face Saksongkram Poptheeratham at Best of Siam 2 in Paris on November 22, 2012. It marked his return to Muay Thai as well as his natural weight class of -61 kg/135 lb, although Saksongkram was still the larger fighter. He lost by TKO due to a cut in round four after being dominated to bring his losing streak to three.

He put a halt to his three fight skid with a disqualification win over Pokaew Fonjaengchonburi at Le Choc des Légendes in Paris on March 10, 2013. Özkul dropped Pokaew, who was coming up from featherweight and taking his first fight internationally, in round one but the Thai only came back stronger. At the end of the second round, Pokaew continued to attack Özkul after the bell and opened a cut with a knee to the face, resulting in a disqualification.

Best of Siam 4 in Paris played host to a highly anticipated match between Yetkin Özkul and fellow brawler Pornsanae Sitmonchai on June 20, 2013, with the Turk coming in as a slight underdog. The fight lived up to expectations and Özkul came out throwing hard shots straight from the first bell. In round two, however, Pornsanae almost dropped him with a series of counter punches. Pornsanae started utilizing his trademark low kicks midway through the third round, and Özkul in turn began to incorporate spinning heel kicks into his arsenal and ended the round by landing seven of them consecutively. Özkul began to pull away in round four as Pornsanae faded and won the fight by unanimous decision but not before a display of macho posturing and taunting in the fifth and final.

He competed in La 20ème Nuit des Champions -62 kg/136 lb tournament in Marseille, France on November 23, 2013, beating Masahiro Yamamoto on points in the semi-finals before losing to Karim Bennoui by the same margin in the final.

Özkul defeated Pornsanae Sitmonchai via third-round TKO in a rematch at Le Choc des Légendes 2014 in Saint-Ouen, Seine-Saint-Denis, France on March 8, 2014, originally the match was claimed to be for the WBC Muaythai World Lightweight (-61.2 kg/135 lb) Championship. But there was considerable controversy surrounding the match as the Sitmonchai camp claimed post-fight that Pornsanae had only been informed of the title on the line in the days leading up to the fight and that Özkul had been prevented from making the contracted weight due to stomach problems and instead weighed in around 72 kg/160 lb, although no official weigh-ins took place. Sitmonchai reluctantly accepted the fight due to their dependency on the promoter to pay them and get them back to Thailand.

He lost his ISKA world super lightweight title in his first attempted defence when he lost to Koya Urabe via unanimous decision at Best of Fight in Guéret, France, on May 1, 2014. His preparation for the fight was somewhat disrupted when he received sixteen stitches in his hand after a domestic accident.

He was set to rematch Saenchai PKSaenchaimuaythaigym in a fight for the WMC World Lightweight (-61.2 kg/135 lb) Championship at Monte Carlo Fighting Masters 2014 in Monte Carlo, Monaco on June 14, 2014. Saenchai was replaced by his stablemate Pakorn PKSaenchaimuaythaigym for undisclosed reasons, however, and Özkul lost by unanimous decision.

== Championships and awards ==
=== Kickboxing ===
- A1 World Combat Cup
  - A1 World Combat Cup -61 kg/134 lb Championship
- French Kickboxing
  - French -60 kg/132 lb Muay Thai Championship
- International Sport Karate Association
  - ISKA World Super Lightweight (-62.3 kg/137.3 lb) Oriental Championship
- La Nuit des Champions
  - La 20ème Nuit des Champions -62 kg/136 lb Tournament Runner-up
- Super Showdown
  - Super Showdown 2 –59 kg/130 lb Tournament Championship
- Turkish Kickboxing
  - Turkish Kickboxing Championship
  - Turkish Muay Thai Championship
- World Muaythai Federation
  - 2004 WMF World Championships -57 kg/125 lb bronze medalist (bronze)

== Kickboxing record ==
Kickboxing record
68 wins (30 KOs), 16 losses, 0 draws
Date	Result	Opponent	Event	Location	Method	Round	Time
2017-12-09	Loss	(France) Aiman Al Hadhi	Golden Fight	France	TKO (Referee Stoppage/Left High Kick)	1	2:00
2017-10-19	Loss	(Spain) Daniel Puertas Gallardo	Partouche Kickboxing Tour -63 kg Tournament Final	France	TKO (Referee Stoppage/Right High Knee)	1	2:48
2017-10-19	Win	(France) Mohamed Galaoui	Partouche Kickboxing Tour -63 kg Tournament Semi Finals	France	KO (punches)	1	1:55
2017-05-20	Loss	(Netherlands) Zakaria Zouggary	Glory 41 Holland	Netherlands	Decision (Unanimous)	3	3:00
2015-11-28	Loss	(France) Mehdi Zatout	Venum Victory World Series 2015	Paris, France	Decision	3	3:00
2015-06-19	Loss	(Thailand) Saenchai PKSaenchaimuaythaigym	Best of Siam 6	Paris, France	TKO (Broken Nose)	5	
2015-03-07	Win	(Spain) Daniel Puertas Gallardo	Le Choc des Légendes	France	Decision	5	3:00
2014-06-14	Loss	(Thailand) Pakorn PKSaenchaimuaythaigym	Monte Carlo Fighting Masters 2014	Monte Carlo, Monaco	Decision (unanimous)	5	3:00
For the WMC World Lightweight (-61.2 kg/135 lb) Championship.
2014-04-01	Loss	(Japan) Koya Urabe	Best of Fight	Guéret, France	Decision (unanimous)	5	3:00
Loses the ISKA World Super Lightweight (-62.3 kg/137.3 lb) Oriental Championship.
2014-03-08	Win	(Thailand) Pornsanae Sitmonchai	Le Choc des Légendes 2014	Saint-Ouen, France	TKO (punches)	3	0:52
2013-11-23	Loss	(France) Karim Bennoui	La 20ème Nuit des Champions, Final	Marseilles, France	Decision	3	3:00
For La 20ème Nuit des Champions -62 kg/136 lb Tournament Championship.
2013-11-23	Win	(Japan) Masahiro Yamamoto	La 20ème Nuit des Champions, Semi Finals	Marseilles, France	Decision	3	3:00
2013-06-20	Win	(Thailand) Pornsanae Sitmonchai	Best of Siam 4	Paris, France	Decision (unanimous)	5	3:00
2013-03-10	Win	(Thailand) Pokaew Fonjangchonburi	Le Choc des Légendes	Paris, France	DQ (Pokaew continued to attack after the bell)	2	3:00
2012-11-22	Loss	(Thailand) Saksongkram Poptheeratham	Best of Siam 2	Paris, France	TKO (cut)	4	
2012-11-10	Loss	(Japan) Masaaki Noiri	Krush.24	Tokyo, Japan	Decision (unanimous)	3	3:00
2012-06-09	Loss	(Thailand) Jomthong Chuwattana	Battle for the Belts	Bangkok, Thailand	Decision (unanimous)	5	3:00
For the WBC Muaythai World Lightweight (-61.235 kg/135 lb) Championship.
2012-05-19	Win	(France) Thomas Adamandopoulos	Urban Boxing United	Marseille, France	TKO (punches)	4	
Wins the ISKA World Super Lightweight (-62.3 kg/137.3 lb) Oriental Championship.
2012-04-00	Win	(Netherlands) Ilias el Hajoui	A1 World Combat Cup	Eindhoven, Netherlands	KO (left hook)	1	2:50
Wins the A1 World Combat Cup -61 kg/134 lb Championship.
2012-03-10	Win	(Thailand) Rungravee Sasiprapa	Le Choc des Légendes	Paris, France	Decision	5	3:00
2011-11-05	Win	(Netherlands) Ilias el Hajoui	Super Showdown 2, Final	Clydebank, Scotland	KO (left hook)	1	1:35
Wins the Super Showdown 2 -59 kg/130 lb Tournament Championship.
2011-11-05	Win	(Portugal) Jose Varela	Super Showdown 2, Semi Finals	Clydebank, Scotland	Decision	3	3:00
2011-11-05	Win	(England) Darren O'Connor	Super Showdown 2, Quarter Finals	Clydebank, Scotland	KO (left hook)	1	2:16
2010-10-29	Loss	(Thailand) Rungravee Sasiprapa	France vs. Lumpinee	Paris, France	Decision (majority)	5	3:00
2010-04-03	Loss	(Thailand) Saenchai Sor. Kingstar	S-8 Thaiboxing	Wuppertal, Germany	KO (left cross)	2	1:48
2009-05-02	Win	(Thailand) Hongfah	France vs. Thailande	Épinal, France	Decision	5	3:00
2008-12-19	Lose	(France) Thomas Adamandopoulos	Kickboxing Championnat D'Europe	Marseille, France	Decision (Unanimous)	3	3:00
2008-12-06	Win	(France) Xavier Bastard	Le Choc des Légendes III	Paris, France	TKO (punches)	1	
Retains the French -60 kg/132 lb Muay Thai Championship.
2008-04-00	Win	(France) Xavier Bastard		Biarritz, France	Decision	5	3:00
Wins the French -60 kg/132 lb Muay Thai Championship.
2008-03-08	Win	(Thailand) Kantipong	Fight Night in Düsseldorf	Düsseldorf, Germany	Decision	5	3:00
2008-02-09	Loss	(France) Mounir Bouti	Le Choc des Légendes II	Paris, France	Decision	5	3:00
2007-11-17	Win	(Netherlands) Delom Carrilho	Premier Round	Lille, France			
2007-05-12	Win	(Thailand) Saichon Por. Pramuk	France vs. Thailande	France	Decision	5	3:00
Legend: Win Loss Draw/No contest Notes
