= Timur Aylyarov =

Russian kickboxer (born 1989)

- Born: February 2, 1989 (age 37); Vladikavkaz, Russia
- Native name: Тимур Айляров
- Nationality: (Russia) Russian
- Height: 1.86 m (6 ft 1 in)
- Weight: 85 kg (187 lb; 13.4 st)
- Style: Muay Thai, Kickboxing
- Stance: Orthodox
- Fighting out of: Russia
- Team: Vityaz fight
- Years active: 2007 - present

Kickboxing record
- Total: 18
- Wins: 15
- By knockout: 6
- Losses: 3
- By knockout: 1

Timur Aylyarov (born February 2, 1989) is a Russian kickboxer. He is the K-1 World GP EURO -85 kg winner.

== Kickboxing career ==
Timur took part in the 2015 Tatneft Cup 80 kg Tournament. He defeated Giuseppe De Domenico in the 1/8 of the tournament by a second round TKO. He beat Sergej Braun in the quarterfinals and Pavel Turuk in the semifinals by unanimous decision. The fight with Alexander Dimitrenko in the finals went into an extra fourth round, after which Aylyarov won a decision.

Aylyarov participated in the 2016 85 kg K-1 World Grand Prix. He knocked out Vasil Ducár in the quarter finals. In the semifinals, Timur met Agron Preteni, whom he defeated by unanimous decision. In the finals, he fought Igor Emkić, and won the tournament through a second round TKO.

Returning after a two year absence from the sport, Aylyarov fought Artur Kyshenko during KLF 74. He lost the fight by a third round TKO.

== Titles ==
- 2015 Tatneft Cup -80 kg Champion
- 2016 WKF World Middleweight Champion
- 2016 K-1 World GP EURO -85 kg Tournament winner

== Fight record ==
Professional Muay Thai & kickboxing record
15 wins (6 (T)KOs), 3 losses
Date	Result	Opponent	Event	Location	Method	Round	Time
2018-05-13	Loss	(Ukraine) Artur Kyshenko	Kunlun Fight 74	China	TKO (punches)	3	2:40
2016-12-03	Win	(Bosnia and Herzegovina) Igor Emkić	K-1 World GP EURO: -85 kg Tournament Final	Tuzla, Bosnia and Herzegovina	TKO (punches)	2	
Wins K-1 World GP EURO -85kg Tournament.
2016-12-03	Win	(Croatia) Agron Preteni	K-1 World GP EURO: -85 kg Tournament Semi Finals	Tuzla, Bosnia and Herzegovina	Decision (unanimous)	3	3:00
2016-12-03	Win	(Czech Republic) Vasil Ducár	K-1 World GP EURO: -85 kg Tournament Quarter Finals	Tuzla, Bosnia and Herzegovina	KO		
2016-09-16	Win	(Russia) Jiri Kopechny	Strong Russia	Russia	TKO (punches)	2	1:12
Wins WKF World Middleweight title.
2016-05-19	Loss	(Russia) Nadir Iskhakov	Grand Prix Russia Open 20	Russia	Decision (unanimous)	5	3:00
For the GPRO Intercontinental -85kg title.
2016-02-27	Win	(Netherlands) Darryl Sichtman	ACB KB 5: Let's Knock The Winter Out	Orel, Russia	Decision	3	3:00
2015-06-18	Win	(Russia) Evegeniy Vorontsov	Grand Prix Russia Open 17	Russia	Decision (unanimous)	3	3:00
2015-09-04	Win	(Russia) Aleksandr Dmitrenko	Tatneft Cup, -80 kg Tournament Final	Kazan, Russia	Ext.R decision	4	3:00
Wins Tatneft Cup -80kg title.
2015-08-04	Win	(Belarus) Pavel Turuk	Tatneft Cup, -80 kg Tournament Semi Final	Kazan, Russia	Decision (unanimous)	3	3:00
2015-04-29	Win	(Germany) Sergej Braun	Tatneft Cup, -80 kg Tournament Quarter Final	Kazan, Russia	Decision (unanimous)	3	3:00
2015-01-24	Win	(Italy) Giuseppe De Domenico	Tatneft Cup, -80 kg Tournament 1/8 Final	Kazan, Russia	TKO (punches)	2	
2014-	Win	(Russia) Artur Gaydarbekov		Russia	TKO (high kick)	2	
2014-03-28	Win	(Russia) Alexander Mischenko	EFN: Battle of Moscow 15	Moscow, Russia	KO		
2007-11-30	Loss	(Russia) Sergey Mostaikin	Tatneft Cup	Kazan, Russia	Decision (unanimous)	3	3:00
Legend: Win Loss Draw/no contest Notes

== See also ==
- List of male kickboxers
