= Jordann Pikeur =

Dutch kickboxer

- Born: 1 September 1990 (age 36); Willemstad, Curaçao
- Other names: Shaggy
- Nationality: Curaçaoan; Dutch
- Height: 1.78 m (5 ft 10 in)
- Weight: 70 kg (150 lb; 11 st)
- Division: Featherweight
- Style: Kickboxing
- Stance: Orthodox
- Fighting out of: Amsterdam, Netherlands
- Team: Mike's Gym
- Trainer: Mike Passenier

Kickboxing record
- Total: 62
- Wins: 49
- By knockout: 22
- Losses: 12
- By knockout: 4
- Draws: 1

Jordann Pikeur (born 1 September 1990) is a Curaçaoan-Dutch kickboxer and K-1 Krush Super Welterweight champion.

He was ranked in the Combat Press featherweight top ten between April 2019 and March 2022, peaking at #2.

== Kickboxing career ==
Pikeur participated in the 2015 K-1 Super Welterweight Grand Prix. In the quarterfinals, he defeated Daiki Watabe by a second-round KO. In the semifinals, he defeated Sanny Dahlbeck, likewise by a second-round KO. In the finals, Pikeur faced Marat Grigorian, and lost the fight in the first round, by knockout.

During Krush 65, Pikeur was scheduled to fight Hiroki Nakajima for the Krush Super Welterweight title. He won the fight by unanimous decision. He successfully defended his title three months later, during Krush 67, defeating Yoichi Yamazaki by knockout. He defended his title for the second time with a unanimous decision win against Yu Hirono.

Pikeur took part in the 2017 K-1 Middleweight Grand Prix. He beat Hinata by unanimous decision in the quarterfinals. He lost by KO, to the eventual tournament winner, Chingiz Allazov in the semifinals.

In his next fight, Jordann was scheduled to defend his Krush title against Yutaro Yamauchi. He beat Yamauchi by a second-round KO. He defended his Krush title for the fourth time during Krush 93, when he was scheduled to fight Hiromi Wajima. Pikeur won the fight by unanimous decision.

In November 2018, Pikeur was scheduled to fight the future K-1 Super Welterweight champion Minoru Kimura. He beat Kimura by a third-round TKO. During K'Festa 2, Pikeur beat Masaaki Noiri by majority decision.

Jordann was scheduled to defend his Krush title for the fifth time against Katsuya Jinbo during Krush 102. He won the fight by unanimous decision. He extended his winning streak with a knockout of Kaisei Kondo in November 2019.

Pikeur challenged Yuta Kubo for the K-1 Welterweight title during K'Festa 3. Kubo won the fight by unanimous decision.

== Championships and awards ==
- Krush
  - 2016 Krush Super Welterweight -70 kg Champion
    - Five successful title defenses
- K-1
  - 2015 K-1 World GP 2015 -70kg Tournament Runner-up

== Kickboxing record ==
Kickboxing Record
49 Wins (22 (T)KO's), 11 Losses, 1 Draw, 0 No Contest
Date	Result	Opponent	Event	Location	Method	Round	Time
2026-09-19	Loss	(Germany) Karoo Gijahi	World Fighting League, semifinals	Utrecht, Netherlands	Decision (unanimous)	3	3:00
2024-10-05	Win	(Brazil) Dengue Silva	K-1 World GP 2024 in Osaka	Osaka, Japan	Ext.R Decision (Unanimous)	4	3:00
2023-07-17	Loss	(Japan) Hiromi Wajima	K-1 World GP 2023	Tokyo, Japan	TKO (Referee stoppage)	2	2:17
For the K-1 Super Welterweight (-70kg) title.
2023-03-12	Win	(Nepal) Abiral Ghimire	K-1 World GP 2023: K'Festa 6	Tokyo, Japan	KO (Left hook)	3	0:06
2022-05-14	Loss	(Morocco) Mustapha Hourri	Fight Time	Noordwijk, Netherlands	TKO (retirement/leg injury)	2	3:00
2022-02-12	Loss	(Russia) Vasiliy Semenov	Fair Fight XVI	Yekaterinburg, Russia	Decision (Unanimous)	3	3:00
2020-03-22	Loss	(Japan) Yuta Kubo	K-1: K’Festa 3	Saitama, Japan	Decision (Unanimous)	3	3:00
For the K-1 Welterweight (-67.5kg) title.
2019-11-24	Win	(Japan) Kaisei Kondo	K-1 World GP 2019 Yokohamatsuri	Yokohama, Japan	TKO (3 Knockdowns/Punches)	2	2:40
2019-06-21	Win	(Japan) Katsuya Jinbo	K-1 KRUSH FIGHT.102	Tokyo, Japan	Decision (Unanimous)	3	3:00
Defends the Krush Super Welterweight Belt.
2019-03-10	Win	(Japan) Masaaki Noiri	K-1 World GP 2019: K’FESTA 2	Saitama, Japan	Decision (Majority)	3	3:00
2018-11-03	Win	(Brazil) Minoru Kimura	K-1 World GP 2018: 3rd Super Lightweight Championship Tournament	Saitama, Japan	TKO (4 knockdowns)	3	1:30
2018-09-30	Win	(Japan) Hiromi Wajima	Krush.93	Tokyo, Japan	Decision (Unanimous)	3	3:00
Defends the Krush Super Welterweight Belt.
2018-01-27	Win	(Japan) Yutaro Yamauchi	Krush.84	Tokyo, Japan	KO (Punches)	2	2:20
Defends the Krush Super Welterweight Belt.
2017-06-18	Loss	(Belarus) Chingiz Allazov	K-1 World GP 2017 Super Middleweight Championship Tournament, Semi Finals	Tokyo, Japan	KO (Right Hook)	1	2:17
2017-06-18	Win	(Japan) Hinata	K-1 World GP 2017 Super Middleweight Championship Tournament, Quarter Finals	Tokyo, Japan	Decision (Unanimous)	3	3:00
2017-03-19	Win	(Netherlands) William Diender	Fight Time	Haarlem, Netherlands	Decision	3	3:00
2017-01-15	Win	(Japan) Yu Hirono	Krush.72	Tokyo, Japan	Decision (Unanimous)	3	3:00
Defends the Krush Super Welterweight Belt.
2016-10-16	Win	(Morocco) Brahim Kallah	ACB KB 8: Only The Braves	Netherlands	TKO	1	
2016-07-18	Win	(Japan) Yoichi Yamazaki	Krush.67	Tokyo, Japan	KO (Straight Right)	2	2:42
Defends the Krush Super Welterweight Belt.
2016-04-10	Win	(Japan) Hiroki Nakajima	Krush.65	Tokyo, Japan	Decision (Unanimous)	3	3:00
Wins the Krush Super Welterweight Belt.
2016-02-27	Win	(Moldova) Cristian Dorel	King of Kings: World Grand Prix 2016	Rīga, Latvia	Decision	3	3:00
2016-01-23	Win	(Morocco) Redouan Daoudi	Sportmani Events VIII	Amsterdam, Netherlands	KO	1	
2015-11-28	Win	(Netherlands) Angaar Nasr	Ring Stars	Netherlands	Decision	5	3:00
2015-10-10	Loss	(England) Jordan Watson	Yokkao 15	Bolton, England	Decision (unanimous)	5	3:00
2015-07-04	Loss	(Armenia) Marat Grigorian	K-1 World GP 2015 -70kg Championship Tournament, Final	Tokyo, Japan	KO (punches)	1	1:24
For the K-1 -70kg Championship.
2015-07-04	Win	(Sweden) Sanny Dahlbeck	K-1 World GP 2015 -70kg Championship Tournament, Semi Finals	Tokyo, Japan	TKO (2 Knockdowns)	2	1:03
2015-07-04	Win	(Japan) Daiki Watabe	K-1 World GP 2015 -70kg Championship Tournament, Quarter Finals	Tokyo, Japan	KO (Body Punches)	2	2:55
2015-05-04	Win	(Japan) Yoshihiro Sato	Krush 54	Tokyo, Japan	KO (Left Hook)	2	2:46
2015-04-17	Loss	(Netherlands) Buray Bozaryilmaz	World Fighting League	Hoofddorp, Netherlands	Decision (Unanimous)	3	3:00
2014-11-17	Loss	(Lithuania) Tadas Jonkus	King of Kings: Hero's Bushido Vilnius 2014	Vilnius, Lithuania	Decision (Split)	3	3:00
2014-05-17	Win	(Germany) Tarek Gromnica	Eggesiner Fight Cup	Eggesin, Germany	Decision	3	3:00
2013-12-21	Loss	(Greece) Meletis Kakoubavas	The Battle VIII	Greece	Decision (Unanimous)	3	3:00
Legend: Win Loss Draw/No contest Notes

== See also ==
- List of male kickboxers
