= Yasuhiro Kido =

Japanese kickboxer

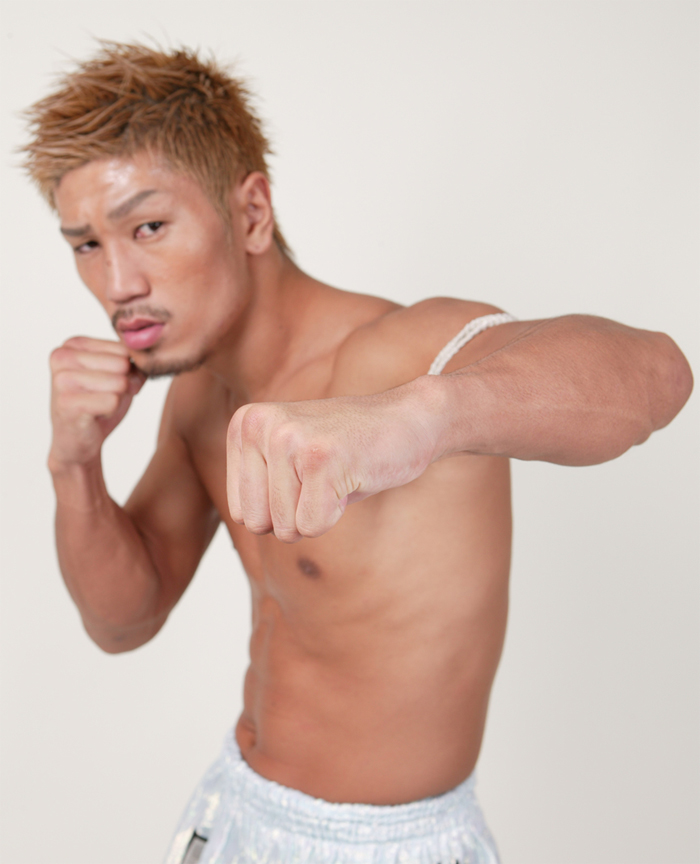
- Born: December 25, 1982 (age 43); Isehara, Japan
- Native name: 城戸康裕
- Other names: Golden Hit Man
- Height: 1.86 m (6 ft 1 in)
- Weight: 70 kg (154 lb; 11 st 0 lb)
- Division: Welterweight
- Style: Karate, Kickboxing
- Stance: Orthodox
- Fighting out of: Odawara, Japan
- Team: Seibukan (2001-2003); Taniyama Gym (2003-2022, 2025-); TEAM ONE (2023-2024)
- Years active: 2003–present

Kickboxing record
- Total: 90
- Wins: 60
- By knockout: 29
- Losses: 27
- By knockout: 8
- Draws: 2
- No contests: 1

Other information
- University: Kokushikan University
- Website: kido.blog.players.tv
- Last updated on: December 1, 2013

Yasuhiro Kido (Japanese: 城戸康裕; born December 25, 1982) is a Japanese kickboxer, currently competing in the lightweight division of Rizin Fighting Federation.

A professional competitor since 2003, he is the 2008 K-1 World MAX Japan tournament winner and the 2017 K-1 Super Welterweight Grand Prix runner-up. He is the former Krush Super Welterweight champion, having held the title from 2012 until 2014.

== Kickboxing career ==
=== Background ===
Yasuhiro Kido was born in Kanagawa, Japan on December 25, 1982. When he was a junior high school student, he belonged to a track and field athletics team, and was training in sprinting. After graduation, he saw K-1 on television and joined Taniyama gym.

After graduation of Ishida high school, Kido entered at faculty of Physical Education at Kokushikan University. At that time, he joined its kickboxing team.

In 2001, he won the title of University Kickboxing Federation (UKF) at welterweight. In 2002, he won the title of UKF again at middleweight. In 2003, he participated All Japan Shin-Karatedo Championship at middleweight. He won the 3rd place.

When he graduated university, he got license to be a teacher for junior high school and high school.

=== Early career ===
Kido made his professional debut against Tatsuro Irie at MAJKF "Explosion-3" on September 14, 2003. He won the fight by a second-round knockout. He would go on to amass a 5–0 record over the course of the next 13 months.

Kido was scheduled to face Koichi Kikuchi at R.I.S.E. "Dead or Alive Tournament '04" on October 31, 2004, in the quarterfinals of the super welterweight tournament. Kido lost the fight by a second-round knockout. He was knocked down with low kicks in both the first and second rounds, and was unable to stand up after the second low kick knockdown in the second round.

Kido was scheduled to face Tsurugi at Ikusa "YGZ04 Bird-Base" on March 12, 2005. He knocked Tsurugi down with a head kick at the very end of the first round. He continued pressuring in the second round, finally knocking Tsurugi out with a head kick at the 2:32 minute mark.

Kido was scheduled to face Yuya Yamamoto in the opening bout of K-1 World MAX 2005 World Tournament Open on May 4, 2005. Although Yamamoto entered the bout as the favorite, he had trouble dealing with Kido. In the last minute of the bout, Yamamoto managed to knock Kido down with a head kick. The automatic 10-8 round awarded to Yamamoto was reflected in the scorecards, as he won by unanimous decision, with scores of 29–28, 30-28 and 30–28.

Kido was scheduled to face Kenshi Toda at Ikusa GP -U60 Superstarz Tournament -Final Stage- on September 19, 2005. Kido combined lead leg middle and high kicks with knees and the second round, with Toda appearing unable to deal with them. Midway through the second round, Kido clinched Toda and landed several undefended knees, which forced his opponent's corner to throw in the towel.

Kido was scheduled to fight Hideki Mizutani in the quarterfinals of the RISE Welterweight Dead or Alive tournament, held at R.I.S.E. "Dead or Alive Tournament '05" on December 18, 2005. Although Kido appeared to be leading on the scorecards after the first two rounds, he lost by a come-from-behind head kick knockout, early on in the third round.

Kido was scheduled to face Zenmaru Hidari at W Capsule Vol.1 on January 28, 2006. He won the fight by unanimous decision, with scores of 30–28, 30-27 and 30–27.

=== MAJKF ===
Kido was scheduled to make his promotional debut with MAJKF against K.Lewis at MAJKF "Surpring 3rd" on April 29, 2006. The fight was ruled a majority draw after the first three rounds were contested, with one judge giving Kido a 30-29 scorecard. Lewis was awarded a unanimous decision, after an extra round was fought.

Kido was scheduled to face Matsuo Akamine at W Capsule on June 11, 2006. The fight was ruled a majority draw by technical decision, at the 2:11 minute mark of the second round. The two of them fought an immediate rematch at MAJKF "Surprising 6th" on August 6, 2006. Kido won the rematch by a third-round knockout, stopping Akamine with a head kick, 13 seconds into the round.

==== MAJKF Middleweight champion ====
Kido fought a rematch with K.Lewis for the vacant MAJKF Middleweight Championship at MAJKF "Surprising-8 MAJKF Festival All Title Matches" on December 3, 2006. Kido cut Lewis with an elbow in the fourth round, prompting the ringside doctor to stop the fight.

Kido made his return to K-1 at K-1 World MAX 2007 Japan Tournament on February 5, 2007, when he was scheduled to face Kenji Kawabata. Kido knocked Kawabata with a combination of a right straight and head kick in the first round. He continued pressuring after the fight resumed, knocking Kawabata with a right straight at the 2:26 minute mark.

Kido was scheduled to face Gōzō Mitsuyama at K-1 World MAX 2007 World Elite Showcase on April 4, 2007. He won the fight by unanimous decision, with scores of 30–28, 30-27 and 30–28.

Kido was scheduled to face Hiroki Shishido at MAJKF "Breakdown 5" on June 10, 2007. Kido appeared to be the physically more imposing competitor and won the fight by unanimous decision, with scores of 50–48, 49-47 and 50–47. He scored the sole knockdown of the fight in the second round, when he dropped Shishido with a knee.

Kido challenged the reigning M-1 Middleweight champion Shingo Garyu at M-1 "120th Anniversary of Japan-Thailand -Muay Thai Hearty Smiles-" on September 24, 2007. The second round proved to be Kido's most successful, as Kido managed to knock Garyu down with a right straight. Garyu was more successful in the other rounds and won the fight by unanimous decision, with two judges scoring the fight 49–48 in his favor, while the third judge awarded him a 49-47 scorecard.

Kido was scheduled to face Yasuhito Shirasu at MAJKF "Breakdown-8" on December 2, 2007. He won the fight by unanimous decision, with all three judges scoring the fight as 29–28 in his favor.

=== K-1 MAX ===
==== K-1 World MAX 2008 ====
Kido participated in the K-1 World MAX 2008 Japan Tournament, held on February 2, 2008. He was scheduled to face Keiji Ozaki in the tournament quarterfinals. Kido won the fight by unanimous decision, with all three judges scoring the fight 30–28 in his favor. Advancing to the semifinals, Kido was scheduled to face Andy Ologun. He won the closely contested fight by unanimous decision, winning the third round on all three of the judges scorecards. Kido was scheduled to face Hayato in the tournament finals. He won the fight by a first-round knockout, dropping Hayato with a right straight, after both fighters knocked each other down.

Kido was scheduled to face Chi Bin Lim at K-1 World MAX 2008 World Championship Tournament Final 16 on April 9, 2008. He knocked Lim down with a knee strike 40 seconds into the first round. He was next scheduled to face Artur Kyshenko at K-1 World MAX 2008 World Championship Tournament Final 8 on July 7, 2008, with the winner earning his place in the 2008 K-1 MAX final tournament. Kyshenko won the fight by unanimous decision, with scores of 29–28, 30-28 and 30–28.

Although he was unable to earn his place in the tournament final, Kido was scheduled to face Albert Kraus in the tournament reserve fight, held at K-1 World MAX 2008 World Championship Tournament Final on October 1, 2008. He lost the fight by a second-round technical knockout.

==== K-1 World MAX 2009 ====
Kido participated in the K-1 World MAX 2009 Japan Tournament, held on February 23, 2009. He was scheduled to face Hinata Watanabe in the tournament quarterfinals. Watanabe won the fight by unanimous decision. Kido nonetheless advanced to tournament semifinals, as Watanabe was unable to do so, and faced Taishin Kohiruimaki. Kohiruimaki won the fight by a second-round knockout.

Kido was scheduled to face Su Hwan Lee in the reserve of K-1 World MAX 2009 World Championship Tournament Final 16, held on April 21, 2009. He won the fight by unanimous decision. Kido next scheduled to fight Leroy Kaestner in the reserve fight of K-1 World MAX 2009 World Championship Tournament Final 8. He won the fight by a clear unanimous decision, with all three judges awarding him a 30－27 scorecard. His streak of fighting in reserve fights extended to K-1 World MAX 2009 World Championship Tournament Final as well, as he was scheduled to face Yoshihiro Sato. Sato won the fight by a second-round right hook knockout.

==== K-1 World MAX 2010 ====
Kido was scheduled to face Ryuji in the quarterfinals of the K-1 World MAX 2010 -70kg Japan Tournament on March 27, 2010. Ryuji won the fight by majority decision, with scores of 29–28, 29-29 and 28–27. Ryuji knocked Kido down with a right straight in the first round, but appeared to slow down from the second round onward. Kido appeared close to getting a draw, but was deducted a point due to a low blow in the third round.

Kido was scheduled to face Vahid Roshani at K-1 World MAX 2010 -63kg Japan Tournament Final 16 on May 2, 2010. He lost the fight by unanimous decision.

=== BigBang ===
Kido was scheduled to make his BigBang debut against U-jung Kim at Big Bang 2 on July 31, 2010. He won the fight by a first-round knockout, stopping Kim with a head kick.

Kido was scheduled to fight a rematch with Shingo Garyu at Big Bang 3 on September 23, 2010. They previously fought at -1 "120th Anniversary of Japan-Thailand -Muay Thai Hearty Smiles-" on September 24, 2007, with Garyu winning by unanimous decision. Kido was more successful in the rematch, as he won the fight by unanimous decision, with all three judges scoring the bout 30–27 in his favor.

Kido was scheduled to face Takayoshi Kitayama at Big Bang 4 on February 5, 2011. Kido won the fight by a dominant unanimous decision, with scores of 29–28, 29-27 and 29–26. He was deducted a point in the second round, as he was holding Kitayama in the clinch while knocking him down with a knee strike.

Kido was scheduled to face Kazuki Hamazaki at Big Bang 5 on May 15, 2011. He thoroughly dominated Hamazaki and won the fight by a wide unanimous decision. Two of the judges scored the fight 30-26 for Kido, while the third judge scored the fight 30-24 for Kido.

Kido was scheduled to face Kenta Yamada in his return to K-1, in the quarterfinals of K-1 World MAX 2011 -70kg Japan Tournament Final on September 25, 2011. Kenta won the fight by unanimous decision.

Kido was scheduled to face Shintaro Matsukura at Big Bang 7 on December 11, 2011. He won the fight by a second-round spinning backfist knockout.

Kido was scheduled to face Man-Sun Baek at Big Bang 8 on February 25, 2012. Kido knocked Baek down twice in the first round, with a head kick and a right straight, before finally stopping him with a left straight at the 2:02 minute mark of the second round.

=== Krush Super Welterweight champion ===
Kido was scheduled to challenge the reigning Krush Super Welterweight champion Kenta Yamada at Krush.17 on March 17, 2012. The two of them had fought once previously, in the quarterfinals of K-1 World MAX 2011 -70kg Japan Tournament Final, with Kenta winning by decision. Kido won the rematch by a second-round knockout.

==== K-1 World MAX 2012 ====
Kido was scheduled to fight Xu Yan at K-1 World MAX 2012 World Championship Tournament Final 16 on May 27, 2012. He won the fight by a third-round knockout, which earned him a place in the quarterfinals of the 2012 K-1 World MAX tournament.

Kido fought twice before taking part in the MAX tournament. He first fought Yū Hirono at Big Bang 10 on September 2, 2012, and won the fight by unanimous decision, with all three judges awarding him a 30-29 scorecard. Kido next fought Ludovic Millet at Krush.23 on October 8, 2012, and won the fight by unanimous decision, with all three judges scoring the fight 30–26 in his favor.

Kido was scheduled to face Murthel Groenhart in the quarterfinals of the K-1 World MAX 2012 World Championship Tournament Final on December 15, 2012. Groenhart won the fight by a first-round knockout, stopping Kido at the 1:47 minute mark.

==== Title reign ====
Kido was scheduled to make the first defense of his Krush title against Takurō Moriya at Krush.26 on January 26, 2013. Kido won the fight by a second-round knockout.

Kido returned to BigBang for his next two bouts. He was first scheduled to face Asami Zaurus at Big Bang 12 on February 24, 2013. He won the fight by unanimous decision.

Kido was scheduled to make his second Krush title defense against Yutaru Yamauchi at Krush.30 on August 11, 2013. He won the fight by unanimous decision, with scores of 30–27, 30-27 and 30–28.

Kido was scheduled to face Andy Souwer at K-1 World MAX 2013 World Championship Tournament Final 16 on September 14, 2013. Souwer won the fight by unanimous decision. Kido was scheduled to fight Kuntap Weerasakreck at Big Bang 15 on December 1, 2013. He won the fight by split decision.

Kido was scheduled to fight Li Yankun for the WBKF −70 kg World championship at Big Bang 16 on February 23, 2014. He won the fight by a third-round technical knockout, stopping Yankun with a series of knees.

Kido was scheduled to make his third and final Krush title defense against Hiroki Nakajima at Krush.40 on April 15, 2014. He won the fight by unanimous decision, with scores of 29–28, 30-27 and 29–28. Kido scored the sole knockdown of the fight in the first round, dropping Nakajima with a right hook.

Kido vacated the Krush Super Welterweight title on the title on August 21, 2014.

=== ISKA Super Welterweight title fights ===
Kido was scheduled to face the two-time K-1 World MAX tournament winner Andy Souwer at RISE 100 - Blade 0 on July 12, 2014. Souwer won the fight by unanimous decision, after an extra round was fought.

Kido was scheduled to face Samo Petje at Blade 1 on December 29, 2014. He lost the fight by unanimous decision.

Kido was scheduled to defend his WBKF −70 kg World title against Vahid Roshani at Big Bang 20 on February 15, 2015. He won the fight by unanimous decision, with scores of 30–27, 29-26 and 30–27.

Kido was scheduled to challenge the reigning ISKA Super Welterweight champion Armen Petrosyan at Oktagon 2015: 20 Years Edition on April 21, 2015. He lost the fight by split decision. Petrosyan and Kido were scheduled to fight an immediate rematch at Blade FC 2 on August 1, 2015. Petrosyan won the fight by unanimous decision, with all three judges scoring the bout 48-47 for him.

Kido was scheduled to face Zhao Shuai at Kickboxing of the world on January 23, 2016. He won the fight by a second-round head kick knockout.

=== K-1 ===
==== Return to K-1 ====
Kido signed back on with K-1 in early 2016, after K-1 had reformed following its bankruptcy. Kido was scheduled to face Daiki Watabe at K-1 World GP 2016 -65kg World Tournament on June 24, 2016. He won the fight by unanimous decision, with scores of 30–27, 30–27, 29–27.

Kido was scheduled to face the WKA Romanian Welterweight champion Robert Stoica at Big Bang 26 on September 4, 2016. He won the fight by unanimous decision.

Kido was scheduled to face Sanny Dahlbeck at K-1 World GP 2016 Featherweight Championship Tournament on November 3, 2016. He lost the fight by a first-round knockout. Kido later protested that he was illegally clinched preceding the knockout, but his complaint wasn't accepted.

Kido was scheduled to face Kim Min-su at Big Bang 28 on February 12, 2017. He won the fight by a second-round technical knockout. The victory was awarded to him, after he had successfully knocked Kim down three times in just over a minute and a half. All three knockdowns came as a result of a head kick.

==== K-1 Super Welterweight Grand Prix ====
Kido participated in the 2017 Super Welterweight World Grand Pix, held at K-1 World GP 2017 Super Middleweight Championship Tournament on June 18, 2017. Kido was scheduled to face Luke Whelan in the tournament quarterfinals. He won the fight by a third-round body shot knockout. The knockout was preceded by a second-round knockdown, due to a knee strike to the belly of Whelan.

He advanced to the tournament semifinals, where Kido fought a rematch with Sanny Dahlbeck. They fought just seven months prior, with Dahlbeck winning by a first-round knockout. Kido was more successful in the rematch and won by a first-round knockout, due to lowkicks.

Kido faced the two-weight WAKO World champion Chingiz Allazov in the tournament finals. Allazov won the fight by unanimous decision, with all three judges scoring the fight 28–25 in his favor. Kido was knocked down once in the first round, with a left hook, and twice in the third round, with a left and right straights respectively.

==== Drop down to welterweight ====
Following his loss to Allazov, Kido dropped down to welterweight, a 2.5 kg decrease in weight compared to his previous fights. In his first fight in a new weight-class, Kido was scheduled to face Minoru Kimura at K-1 World GP 2017 Heavyweight Championship Tournament on November 23, 2017. Kimura won the fight by unanimous decision, with all three judges awarding him a 30-25 scorecard. Kido was knocked down once in both the second and third rounds.

Kido was scheduled to face Issam Chahid at K-1 World GP 2018: K'FESTA.1 on March 21, 2018. He won the fight by unanimous decision, with scores of 30–27, 30-28 and 30–28.

Kido was scheduled to face Massaro Glunder at K-1 World GP 2018: 2nd Featherweight Championship Tournament on June 17, 2018. He won the fight by disqualification, as Glunder was disqualified for excessive holding, despite numerous warnings from the referee.

Kido was scheduled to face Jonathan Tuhu at K-1 World GP 2018: 3rd Super Lightweight Championship Tournament on November 3, 2018. He won the fight by unanimous decision. During the post-fight interview, Kido called for a title fight with the reigning K-1 Welterweight champion Yuta Kubo.

As Kubo acquiesced to a match, the title fight between the two was scheduled for K-1 World GP 2019: K'FESTA 2 on March 10, 2019. The fight was ruled a majority draw after the first three rounds, with two judges scoring the fight 30-30, while the third judge scored it 30-29 for Kubo. Kubo was awarded a split decision, after an extra round was fought.

==== Return to super welterweight ====
Following his loss to Kubo, Kido returned to super welterweight (-70 kg). He was scheduled to face Antonio Gomez at K-1 World GP 2019: Japan vs World 5 vs 5 & Special Superfight in Osaka on August 24, 2019. Kido won the fight by a second-round head kick knockout.

Kido was scheduled to face Katsuya Jinbo at K-1 World GP 2019 Yokohamatsuri on November 24, 2019. He won the fight by a second-round knockout.

Kido took part in the 2020 K-1 Super Welterweight World Grand Prix, held at K-1: K'Festa 3 on March 22, 2020. He was scheduled to face Milan Pales in the tournament quarterfinals. He won the fight by a second-round knockout, dropping Pales with a head kick. He advanced to the tournament semifinals, where he faced Hiromi Wajima. Wajima won the fight by unanimous decision.

Kido was scheduled to face Daiki Watabe during BigBang's 10th Year Anniversary event, held on November 8, 2020. He won the fight by majority decision, with scores of 29-29, 30-29 and 29–28.

Kido was scheduled to face Daiki Matsushita at K-1: K'Festa 4 on January 24, 2021. The event was later rescheduled for March 31, 2021. won the fight by a second-round technical knockout.

Kido was scheduled to fight a rematch with Yutaro Yamauchi at K-1 World GP 2021: Yokohamatsuri on September 20, 2021. The two of them previously fought at Krush.30, when Kido won by unanimous decision. Kido won the fight by a second-round technical-knockout.

Kido faced Yasuhito Shirasu at Bigbang 42 on June 12, 2022. The bout was a rematch of their December 2, 2007 fight, which Kido won by majority decision. He won the rematch by majority decision as well.

Kido faced Joji at Super Bigbang 2022 on November 13, 2022. He won the fight by a second-round knockout.

On December 16, 2022, it was announced that Kido would depart from K-1, as his contract with the promotion expired.

=== Post K-1 career ===
Kido faced Yukimitsu Takahashi at the inaugural Narigari show on February 5, 2023. The fight was ruled a decision draw after the first and only round of the bout was contested.

Kido faced Sota "Cerberus" Kimura in a -69 kg catchweight bout at Rizin 42 on May 6, 2023. He lost the fight by unanimous decision, after being knocked down in the dying seconds of the final round.

Kido faced the two-time K-1 World MAX champion Buakaw Banchamek at Legend of Rajadamnern: Last of the Generation on September 9, 2023. The fight ended in a no contest, 29 seconds into the third round, due to an accidental clash of heads.

Kido faced Kusa MAX at Super Bigbang 2023 on December 3, 2023. He won the fight by a second-round technical knockout.

Kido faced Yi Long at Space One Champions 2024 on May 7, 2024. He won the fight by a first-round knockout.

Kido faced Wang Kaifeng at Space ONE Champions on November 16, 2024. He lost the fight by a second-round knockout. It was his first stoppage loss in eight years. The pair faced each other in a rematch, with the Space ONE Lightweight title on the line, at BOM x Space One Japan on May 11, 2025. Kido won the fight by unanimous decision.

Kido faced Daiki for the vacant Bigbang Super Welterweight title at Super Bigbang 2025 on November 2, 2025. He captured the vacant championship by unanimous decision.

Kido challenged the RFA K-1 Lightweight (-70 kg) champion Václav Sivák at RFA 29 on March 20, 2026.

== Championships and accomplishments ==
=== Amateur ===
- University Kickboxing Federation
  - 2001 University Kickboxing Federation Welterweight Championship
  - 2002 University Kickboxing Federation Welterweight Championship
- Shin Karate
  - 2003 Shin Karate 14th All Japan K-2 Middleweight Qualifier Tournament Winner
  - 2003 Shin Karate 14th All Japan K-2 Tournament Middleweight 3rd place

=== Professional ===
- K-1
  - 2008 K-1 World MAX Japan Tournament Winner
  - 2017 K-1 World GP 2017 Super Middleweight Championship Tournament Runner-Up
- Krush
  - 2012 Krush Super Welterweight champion (Two title defenses)
- World Bars Kickboxing Federation
  - 2014 WBKF -70 kg World Championship(one defense)
- Space One
  - 2025 Space One Kickboxing Lightweight Champion
- Bigbang
  - 2025 Bigbang Super Welterweight Champion
    - One successful title defense

Awards

- Martial Arts Japan Kickboxing Federation
  - 2007 MAJKF "Fighter of the Year"
- eFight
  - 2007 eFight "Fight of the Year" (vs. Hiroki Shishido, MAJKF, January 14, 2008)

== Kickboxing record ==
Professional kickboxing record
60 Wins (29 (T)KOs), 27 Losses, 2 Draws, 1 No Contest
Date	Result	Opponent	Event	Location	Method	Round	Time	Record
2026-11-03	Win	(Japan) Tetsushi	Super Bigbang 2026	Yokohama, Japan	KO (Left hook to the body)	4	1:37	60–27–2 (1)
Defends the Bigbang Super Welterweight title.
2026-03-20	Loss	(Czech Republic) Václav Sivák	RFA 29	Bratislava, Slovakia	Decision (Unanimous)	5	3:00	59–27–2 (1)
For the RFA K-1 -70 kg Championship.
2025-11-02	Win	(Japan) Daiki	Super Bigbang 2025	Tokyo, Japan	Decision (Unanimous)	3	3:00	59–26–2 (1)
Wins the vacant Bigbang Super Welterweight title.
2025-05-11	Win	(China) Wang Kaifeng	BOM x Space One Japan	Tokyo, Japan	Decision (Unanimous)	3	3:00	58–26–2 (1)
Wins the Space ONE Lightweight title.
2024-11-16	Loss	(China) Wang Kaifeng	Space ONE Champions	Foshan, China	KO (Spinning back fist)	2	2:20	57–26–2 (1)
2024-05-07	Win	(China) Yi Long	Space One Champions 2024	Hong Kong	KO (High kick)	1	2:06	57–25–2 (1)
2023-12-03	Win	(Japan) Kusa MAX	Super Bigbang 2023	Tokyo, Japan	KO (High kick)	2	1:37	56–25–2 (1)
2023-09-09	NC	(Thailand) Buakaw Banchamek	Legend of Rajadamnern: Last of the Generation	Bangkok, Thailand	Doctor stop. (clash of heads)	3	0:29	55–25–2 (1)
2023-05-06	Loss	(Japan) Sota Kimura	Rizin 42	Tokyo, Japan	Decision (Unanimous)	3	3:00	55–25–2
2023-02-05	Draw	(Japan) Yukimitsu Takahashi	NARIAGARI	Tokyo, Japan	Decision	1	3:00	55–24–2
2022-11-13	Win	(Japan) Joji	Super Bigbang 2022	Tokyo, Japan	KO (Punches)	2	2:25	55–24–1
2022-06-12	Win	(Japan) Yasuhito Shirasu	Bigbang 42	Tokyo, Japan	Decision (Majority)	3	3:00	54–24–1
2021-09-20	Win	(Japan) Yutaro Yamauchi	K-1 World GP 2021: Yokohamatsuri	Yokohama, Japan	KO (Punches)	2	2:25	53–24–1
2021-03-28	Win	(Japan) Daiki Matsushita	K-1 World GP 2021: K'Festa 4 Day.2	Tokyo, Japan	KO (Punches)	2	2:47	52–24–1
2020-11-08	Win	(Japan) Daisuke Fujimura	Super Bigbang 2020 - Bigbang 10th Year Anniversary	Yokohama, Japan	Decision (Majority)	3	3:00	51–24–1
2020-03-22	Loss	(Japan) Hiromi Wajima	K-1: K'Festa 3 -70 kg Tournament Semi Finals	Saitama, Japan	Decision (Unanimous)	3	3:00	50–24–1
2020-03-22	Win	(Slovakia) Milan Pales	K-1: K'Festa 3 -70 kg Tournament Quarter Finals	Saitama, Japan	KO (Left High Kick)	2	1:54	50–23–1
2019-11-24	Win	(Japan) Katsuya Jinbo	K-1 World GP 2019 Yokohamatsuri	Yokohama, Japan	KO (Punches)	2	2:29	49–23–1
2019-08-24	Win	(Spain) Antonio Gomez	K-1 World GP 2019: Japan vs World 5 vs 5 & Special Superfight in Osaka	Osaka, Japan	KO (Left High Kick)	2	1:48	48–23–1
2019-03-10	Loss	(Japan) Yuta Kubo	K-1 World GP 2019: K'FESTA 2	Saitama, Japan	Ex.R Decision (Split)	4	3:00	47–23–1
Fights Was For K-1 -67.5kg Belt.
2018-11-03	Win	(Papua New Guinea) Jonathan Tuhu	K-1 World GP 2018: 3rd Super Lightweight Championship Tournament	Saitama, Japan	Decision (Unanimous)	3	3:00	47–22–1
2018-06-17	Win	(Netherlands) Massaro Glunder	K-1 World GP 2018: 2nd Featherweight Championship Tournament	Saitama, Japan	Disqualification	3	2:30	46–22–1
2018-03-21	Win	(Morocco) Issam Chahid	K-1 World GP 2018: K'FESTA.1	Saitama, Japan	Decision (Unanimous)	3	3:00	45–22–1
2017-11-23	Loss	(Brazil) Minoru Kimura	K-1 World GP 2017 Heavyweight Championship Tournament, Superfight	Japan	Decision (Unanimous)	3	3:00	44–22–1
2017-06-18	Loss	(Belarus) Chingiz Allazov	K-1 World GP 2017 Super Middleweight Championship Tournament, Final	Tokyo, Japan	Decision (Unanimous)	3	3:00	44–21–1
For the K-1 Super Middleweight Championship and the K-1 World GP -70kg World Tournament.
2017-06-18	Win	(Sweden) Sanny Dahlbeck	K-1 World GP 2017 Super Middleweight Championship Tournament Semi Finals	Tokyo, Japan	KO (Low Kicks)	1	2:28	44–20–1
2017-06-18	Win	(United Kingdom) Luke Whelan	K-1 World GP 2017 Super Middleweight Championship Tournament, Quarter Finals	Tokyo, Japan	KO (Left Middle Kick)	3	1:33	43–20–1
2017-02-12	Win	(South Korea) Kim Min-su	Big Bang 28	Tokyo, Japan	TKO (Three knockdowns)	2	1:33	42–20–1
2016-11-03	Loss	(Sweden) Sanny Dahlbeck	K-1 World GP 2016 Featherweight Championship Tournament	Tokyo, Japan	KO (Punch and Knee)	1	2:09	41–20–1
2016-09-04	Win	(Romania) Robert Stoica	Big Bang 26	Tokyo, Japan	Decision (Unanimous)	3	3:00	41–19–1
2016-06-24	Win	(Japan) Daiki Watabe	K-1 World GP 2016 -65kg World Tournament	Tokyo, Japan	Decision (unanimous)	3	3:00	40–19–1
2016-01-23	Win	(China) Zhao Shuai	Kickboxing of the world	Hunan, China	KO (Left High Kick)	2		39–19–1
2015-08-01	Loss	(Italy) Armen Petrosyan	Blade FC 2	Tokyo, Japan	Decision	5	3:00	38–19–1
For the ISKA Super Welterweight (-70 kg/154 lb) Oriental Rules World Championship.
2015-04-21	Loss	(Italy) Armen Petrosyan	Oktagon 2015: 20 Years Edition	Milan, Italy	Decision (Split)	5	3:00	38–18–1
For the ISKA Super Welterweight (-70 kg/154 lb) Oriental Rules World Championship.
2015-02-15	Win	(Iran) Vahid Roshani	Big Bang 20	Tokyo, Japan	Decision (Unanimous)	3	3:00	38–17–1
Defends the WBKF −70kg World Title.
2014-12-29	Loss	(Slovenia) Samo Petje	Blade 1	Tokyo, Japan	Decision (Unanimous)	3	3:00	37–17–1
2014-07-12	Loss	(Netherlands) Andy Souwer	RISE 100 - Blade 0	Tokyo, Japan	Ext. R. Decision	4	3:00	37–16–1
2014-04-15	Win	(Japan) Hiroki Nakajima	Krush.40	Tokyo, Japan	Decision	3	3:00	37–15–1
Defends the Krush −70kg Championship.
2014-02-23	Win	(China) Li Yankun	Big Bang 16	Tokyo, Japan	TKO	3	2:59	36–15–1
Wins the WBKF −70kg World Title.
2013-12-01	Win	(Thailand) Kuntap Weerasakreck	Big Bang 15	Tokyo, Japan	Decision (Split)	3	3:00	35–15–1
2013-09-14	Loss	(Netherlands) Andy Souwer	K-1 World MAX 2013 World Championship Tournament Final 16	Majorca, Spain	Decision (Unanimous)	3	3:00	34–15–1
2013-08-11	Win	(Japan) Yutaro Yamauchi	Krush.30	Tokyo, Japan	Decision (Unanimous)	3	3:00	34–14–1
Defends the Krush −70kg Championship.
2013-06-02	Win	(Iran) Masoud Minaei	Big Bang 13	Tokyo, Japan	Decision (Unanimous)	3	3:00	33–14–1
2013-02-24	Win	(Japan) Asami Zaurus	Big Bang 12	Tokyo, Japan	Decision (Unanimous)	3	3:00	32–14–1
2013-01-26	Win	(Japan) Takurō Moriya	Krush.26	Tokyo, Japan	KO (Spinning back fist)	2	2:30	31–14–1
Defends the Krush −70kg Championship.
2012-12-15	Loss	(Netherlands) Murthel Groenhart	K-1 World MAX 2012 World Championship Tournament Final, Quarter Finals	Athens, Greece	KO (Right high kick)	1	1:47	30–14–1
2012-10-08	Win	(France) Ludovic Millet	Krush.23	Tokyo, Japan	Decision (Unanimous)	3	3:00	30–13–1
2012-09-02	Win	(Japan) Yū Hirono	Big Bang 10	Tokyo, Japan	Decision (Unanimous)	3	3:00	29–13–1
2012-05-27	Win	(China) Xu Yan	K-1 World MAX 2012 World Championship Tournament Final 16	Madrid, Spain	KO (Spinning Back Fist)	3		28–13–1
2012-03-17	Win	(Japan) Kenta	Krush.17	Tokyo, Japan	KO (Spinning Back Fist)	2	1:28	27–13–1
Wins Kenta's Krush −70kg Championship.
2012-02-25	Win	(South Korea) Man-Sun Baek	Big Bang 8	Tokyo, Japan	KO (right hook)	2	2:02	26–13–1
2011-12-11	Win	(Japan) Shintaro Matsukura	Big Bang 7	Tokyo, Japan	KO (Spinning backfist)	2	2:24	25–13–1
2011-09-25	Loss	(Japan) Kenta	K-1 World MAX 2011 -70kg Japan Tournament Final, Quarter finals	Osaka, Japan	Decision (Unanimous)	3	3:00	24–13–1
2011-05-15	Win	(Japan) Kzuki Hamazaki	Big Bang 5	Tokyo, Japan	Decision (Unanimous)	3	3:00	24–12–1
2011-02-05	Win	(Japan) Takayoshi Kitayama	Big Bang 4	Tokyo, Japan	Decision (Unanimous)	3	3:00	23–12–1
2010-09-23	Win	(Japan) Shingo Garyu	Big Bang 3	Tokyo, Japan	Decision (Unanimous)	3	3:00	22–12–1
2010-07-31	Win	(South Korea) U-jung Kim	Big Bang 2	Tokyo, Japan	KO (Left high kick)	1	1:35	21–12–1
2010-05-02	Loss	(Iran) Vahid Roshani	K-1 World MAX 2010 -63kg Japan Tournament Final 16	Tokyo, Japan	Decision (Unanimous)	3	3:00	20–12–1
2010-03-27	Loss	(Japan) Ryuji	K-1 World MAX 2010 -70kg Japan Tournament Quarterfinals	Saitama, Japan	Decision (Majority)	3	3:00	20–11–1
2009-10-26	Loss	(Japan) Yoshihiro Sato	K-1 World MAX 2009 World Championship Tournament Final Reserve fight	Yokohama, Japan	KO (Right hook)	2	2:23	20–10–1
2009-07-13	Win	(Netherlands) Leroy Kaestner	K-1 World MAX 2009 World Championship Tournament Final 8 Reserve fight	Tokyo, Japan	Decision (Unanimous)	3	3:00	20–9–1
2009-04-21	Win	(South Korea) Su Hwan Lee	K-1 World MAX 2009 World Championship Tournament Final 16 Reserve fight	Fukuoka, Japan	Decision (Unanimous)	3	3:00	19–9–1
2009-02-23	Loss	(Japan) Taishin Kohiruimaki	K-1 World MAX 2009 Japan Tournament, Semi Finals	Tokyo, Japan	KO	2	0:58	18–9–1
2009-02-23	Loss	(Japan) Hinata Watanabe	K-1 World MAX 2009 Japan Tournament, Quarter Finals	Tokyo, Japan	Decision (Unanimous)	Ext.	3:00	18–8–1
2008-10-01	Loss	(Netherlands) Albert Kraus	K-1 World MAX 2008 World Championship Tournament Final Reserve fight	Tokyo, Japan	TKO (Doctor Stop)	2	0:48	18–7–1
2008-07-07	Loss	(Ukraine) Artur Kyshenko	K-1 World MAX 2008 World Championship Tournament Final 8	Tokyo, Japan	Decision (Unanimous)	3	3:00	18–6–1
2008-04-09	Win	(South Korea) Chi Bin Lim	K-1 World MAX 2008 World Championship Tournament Final 16	Hiroshima, Japan	KO (Knee)	1	0:40	18–5–1
2008-02-02	Win	(Japan) Hayato	K-1 World MAX 2008 Japan Tournament, Final	Tokyo, Japan	KO (Punch)	1	1:07	17–5–1
Wins the 2008 K-1 World MAX Japan Tournament title.
2008-02-02	Win	(Nigeria) Andy Ologun	K-1 World MAX 2008 Japan Tournament, Semi Finals	Tokyo, Japan	Decision (Unanimous)	3	3:00	16–5–1
2008-02-02	Win	(Japan) Keiji Ozaki	K-1 World MAX 2008 Japan Tournament, Quarter Finals	Tokyo, Japan	Decision (Unanimous)	3	3:00	15–5–1
2007-12-02	Win	(Japan) Yasuhito Shirasu	MAJKF "Breakdown-8"	Tokyo, Japan	Decision (Majority)	3	3:00	14–5–1
2007-09-24	Loss	(Japan) Shingo Garyu	M-1 "120th Anniversary of Japan-Thailand -Muay Thai Hearty Smiles-"	Tokyo, Japan	Decision (Unanimous)	5	3:00	13–5–1
Bout was for Garyu's M-1 Middleweight title.
2007-06-10	Win	(Japan) Hiroki Shishido	MAJKF "Breakdown 5"	Tokyo, Japan	Decision (Unanimous)	5	3:00	13–4–1
Chosen as 2007 The Fight of The Year by MAJKF.
2007-04-04	Win	(Japan) Gōzō Mitsuyama	K-1 World MAX 2007 World Elite Showcase	Yokohama, Japan	Decision (Unanimous)	3	3:00	12–4–1
2007-02-05	Win	(Japan) Kenji Kawabata	K-1 World MAX 2007 Japan Tournament	Tokyo, Japan	KO (Right cross)	1	2:26	11–4–1
2006-12-03	Win	(Brazil) K.Lewis	MAJKF "Surprising-8 MAJKF Festival All Title Matches"	Tokyo, Japan	TKO (Doctor stoppage)	4	1:44	10–4–1
Wins the vacant title of MAJKF Middleweight championship.
2006-08-06	Win	(Japan) Matsuo Akamine	MAJKF "Surprising 6th"	Tokyo, Japan	KO (Left high kick)	3	0:13	9–4–1
2006-06-11	Draw	(Japan) Matsuo Akamine	W Capsule	Tokyo, Japan	Decision(1–0)	2	2:11	8–4–1
2006-04-29	Loss	(Brazil) K.Lewis	MAJKF "Surpring 3rd"	Tokyo, Japan	Decision (Unanimous)	4(Ex.1)	3:00	8–4
2006-01-28	Win	(Japan) Zenmaru Hidari	W Capsule Vol.1	Tokyo, Japan	Decision (Unanimous)	3	3:00	8–3
2005-12-18	Loss	(Japan) Hideki Mizutani	R.I.S.E. "Dead or Alive Tournament '05", Quarter-final	Tokyo, Japan	KO (Left high kick)	3	0:48	7–3
2005-09-19	Win	(Japan) Kenshi Toda	Ikusa GP -U60 Superstarz Tournament -Final Stage-	Tokyo, Japan	TKO (Towel thrown)	2	1:30	7–2
2005-05-04	Loss	(Japan) Yuya Yamamoto	K-1 World MAX 2005 World Tournament Open	Tokyo, Japan	Decision (Unanimous)	3	3:00	6–2
2005-03-12	Win	(Japan) Tsurugi	Ikusa "YGZ04 Bird-Base"	Tokyo, Japan	KO (Left high kick)	2	2:32	6–1
2004-12-19	Loss	(Japan) Koichi Kikuchi	R.I.S.E. "Dead or Alive Tournament '04", Quarter-final	Tokyo, Japan	KO (Left low kick)	2	1:44	5–1
2004-10-31	Win	(Japan) Tetsuya Yamauchi	R.I.S.E. X	Tokyo, Japan	Decision (Unanimous)	3	3:00	5–0
2004-04-29	Win	(Japan) Shinichiro Inoue	R.I.S.E. VII	Tokyo, Japan	Decision (Unanimous)	3	3:00	4–0
2004-01-24	Win	(Japan) Devil Arakawa	Ikusa "Future Fighter Ikusa 5 -Ran- Monkey Magic"	Tokyo, Japan	KO (Two knock downs)	2	2:54	3–0
2003-11-16	Win	(Japan) Hideto Yamabe	Ikusa "Young Gunners 2"	Tokyo, Japan	Decision (Unanimous)	3	3:00	2–0
2003-09-14	Win	(Japan) Tatsuro Irie	MAJKF "Explosion-3"	Tokyo, Japan	KO (Punches)	2	0:45	1–0
Legend: Win Loss Draw/No contest Notes

== See also ==
- List of Krush champions
- List of male kickboxers
- List of K-1 Events
