= Chingiz Allazov =

Azerbaijani-Belarusian kickboxer (born 1993)

- Born: Chingiz Ayazovich Allazov; 10 June 1993 (age 33); Jandar, Gardabani, Georgia
- Native name: Çingiz Əlləzov; Чынгіз Аллазаў
- Other names: Chinga
- Nationality: Belarusian; Azerbaijani
- Height: 1.81 m (5 ft 11 1/2 in)
- Weight: 70 kg (154 lb; 11 st 0 lb)
- Division: Featherweight (ONE Championship); Lightweight; Welterweight
- Reach: 72 in (183 cm)
- Style: Kickboxing
- Fighting out of: Minsk, Belarus
- Team: Gridin Gym
- Trainer: Andrei Gridin
- Years active: 2009–present

Kickboxing record
- Total: 67
- Wins: 61
- By knockout: 37
- Losses: 5
- No contests: 1
- Last updated on: 17 September 2020

Chingiz Ayazovich Allazov (Azerbaijani: Çingiz Ayaz oğlu Əlləzov, Belarusian: Чынгіз Аязавіч Аллазаў; born 10 June 1993) is a Georgian-born Azerbaijani-Belarusian kickboxer. He previously competed at ONE Championship. He was the former ONE Featherweight Kickboxing World Champion and the 2021 ONE Kickboxing Featherweight World Grand Prix Winner.

A professional competitor since 2009, Allazov is the former K-1 Super Welterweight Champion, the former two-weight WAKO-Pro K-1 rules champion, the former Nuit des Champions Super Welterweight champion and a two-time A1 lightweight tournament winner.

Allazov was ranked as the world's best pound for pound kickboxer by Beyond Kickboxing between February 2023 and February 2025, as well as by Combat Press between February 2023 and January 2025.

== Early life ==
Chingiz Allazov was born in the village of Jandar in Gardabani district, situated on the border between Georgia and Azerbaijan. His family moved to Minsk, Belarus in 1994. He holds a business degree.

== Kickboxing career ==
=== Early career ===
Chingiz started Thai boxing at the early age of 10 to receive self-defence skills. His first coach was Alexander Kovtik. Only 4 months after starting his training he won a Club Tournament. A year later Chingiz received the title of “Best” at the Republican amateur contest and his first Champion of the Republic of Belarus title. Over the next three years he won every tournament in his age category that he participated in. Overall, Chingiz had 207 (204 wins) fights during his amateur career. His first professional experience was in Thailand at the age of 13. At the age of 16 Allazov moved to a professional team called "Chinuk" under the guidance of Andrei Gridin. His first professional fight as an adult was against Jakub Safaric from Slovakia in the 63 kg category. Chingiz won the fight in fifteen second by knockout.

Allazov took part in the 2014 A1 lightweight (-70 kg) tournament, which was held on 23 October 2014. He captured the tournament title after overcoming Wallid Haddad by unanimous decision in the semifinals and Abdallah Mabel in the same manner in the finals. On 31 July 2015, Allazov took part in the 2015 A1 lightweight (-70 kg) qualification tournament. He earned his place in the final tournament after knocking out Michael Pignolo in the second round of their semifinal bout and Kevin Renahy in the third round of their tournament final bout. Allazov faced Ludovic Millet in the semifinals of the Partouche Kickboxing Tour, which was held on 15 October 2015. He won the fight by unanimous decision and advanced to the finals, where he beat Eduard Bernadou by unanimous decision as well.

Allazov faced Djimé Coulibaly for the WAKO-Pro World Middleweight (-72.5 kg) K-1 championship. He captured the title with by unanimous decision. Allazov would fight in two non-title bouts, before challenging for his next WAKO-Pro title. He first beat Christian Baya by unanimous decision at Thai Boxe Mania 2016 on 30 January 2016, which was followed up with a first-round knockout of Wu Sihan at Oktagon 2016: Turin on 16 April 2016. Allazov then faced Enriko Kehl for vacant WAKO-Pro Super Lightweight (-70 kg) K-1 championship. He won the fight by a fifth-round knockout.

Allazov faced Bruce Codron for the NDC super welterweight (-70 kg) title Nuit Des Champions 2016 on 19 November 2016. He stopped Codron in the fourth round, first staggering him with a head kick, before he finishing him off with a flurry of strikes. Allazov's next two fights likewise took place on the European circuit, as he knocked Karim Allous out in the first round at Thai Boxe Mania 2017 on 28 January 2017, and won a unanimous decision against Mohamed Hendouf at Victory – ACB KB9: Showdown in Paris on 25 March 2017. Allazov made his Wu Lin Feng debut against Saiyok Pumpanmuang on 1 April 2017. He won the fight by dominant decision.

=== K-1 Super Welterweight champion ===
==== Super welterweight Grand Prix ====
On 21 March 2017, it was revealed that Allazov would be one of the eight participants in the 2017 K-1 WGP Super Welterweight Championship Tournament, which was scheduled to take place on 18 June 2017. He faced the K-1 World MAX 2010 -70kg Japan Tournament runner-up Hiroki Nakajima in the quarterfinals of the one-day tournament. Allazov won the fight by knockout, as he floored Nakajima with a left uppercut midway through the second round. He faced the reigning Krush Super Welterweight (-70 kg) champion Jordann Pikeur in the semifinals. Allazov once again won by stoppage, as he knocked Pikeur out at the 2:17 minute mark of the opening round. He captured the vacant K-1 Super Welterweight Championship after he overcame the longtime K-1 veteran Yasuhiro Kido by unanimous decision in the finals, with all three judges awarding him a 28–25 scorecard.

==== Title reign ====
Allazov faced Dzhabar Askerov in the semifinals of the 2017 Wu Lin Feng Yi Long challenge Tournament, which was held on 5 August 2017. Although he was able to win the fight by unanimous decision, Allazov was forced to withdraw from the tournament with an injury. In his eighth and final fight of the year, Allazov made his first NDC super welterweight (-70 kg) title defense against Cedric Manhoef at Nuit Des Champions 2017 on 25 November 2017. He retained the belt by unanimous decision.

Allazov faced Sudsakorn Sor Klinmee at Thai Boxe Mania on 28 January 2018. He won the fight by unanimous decision, which improved his score against the Thai to 2–0. Allazov made his first K-1 title defense against Hinata Watanabe at K-1 World GP 2018: K'FESTA.1 on 21 March 2018. He stopped Watanabe with a left hook early in the second round. Allazov extended his lengthy win streak to 28 fights with a second-round knockout of Claudiu Bădoi at Duel 3 on 8 April 2018. Allazov vacated the K-1 title on 5 February 2019, after signing with Bellator Kickboxing.

=== Bellator Kickboxing ===
On 20 June 2018, Bellator Kickboxing announced that Allazov would face the two-time K-1 World MAX tournament winner and top pound for pound kickboxer Giorgio Petrosyan at Bellator Kickboxing 10 on 14 July 2018. Petrosyan won the fight by a dominant unanimous decision, which snapped Allazov's four-year long 28-fight win streak. Two of the judges scored the bout 49–45 for the Petrosyan, while the third judge awarded the Italian fighter an even wider 50–44 scorecard.

Allazov bounced back from this loss with a unanimous decision victory over Mohamed Hendouf at Nuit Des Champions on 24 November 2018, in what was his second and final NDC title defense. Allazov faced Sudsakorn Sor Klinmee for the third time in his professional career at Bellator Kickboxing 12 on 12 October 2019. He won the fight by a unanimous decision.

Following the Sudsakorn fight, it was revealed that Allazov suffered an injury to his right hand. He was expected to make his kickboxing return, following a 13-month layoff, against Frederic Berrichon. The government restrictions, in response to the COVID-19 pandemic, prevented Nuit Des Champions from holding the event, so Allazov's fight was postponed until early 2021.

=== ONE Championship ===
==== ONE Featherweight Grand Prix ====
On 16 January 2021, it was announced that Allazov had signed with ONE Championship. Allazov made his ONE debut against Enriko Kehl at ONE on TNT 1 on 7 April 2021. He lost a close bout via split decision.

Allazov faced Samy Sana in the quarter-finals of the 2021 ONE Kickboxing Featherweight Grand Prix at ONE Championship: First Strike on 15 October 2021. Allazov won the fight by knockout in 39 seconds of the first round via liver punch, becoming the first fighter to knock Sana out.

Allazov was booked to face Marat Grigorian in the semifinals of the ONE Featherweight Kickboxing World Grand Prix at ONE: Only the Brave on 28 January 2022. Grigorian was later replaced by Jo Nattawut after the former tested positive for COVID-19. Allazov won in dominant fashion by first-round knockout. Allazov faced Sitthichai Sitsongpeenong at ONE: X on 26 March 2022, in the tournament finals. He won the fight by unanimous decision.

==== ONE Featherweight champion ====
Allazov was expected to face Superbon Singha Mawynn for the ONE Featherweight Kickboxing World Championship at ONE on Prime Video 2 on 1 October 2022. Allazov withdrew with an injury on 21 September. His fight with Superbon was rescheduled for ONE on Prime Video 5 on 3 December 2022. In turn, Superbon was forced to withdraw due to an illness and the bout was moved to headline at ONE on Prime Video 6 on 14 January 2023. He won the bout via knockout in the second round and earned the title. This win earned him the Performance of the Night award.

Allazov made his first ONE Featherweight Kickboxing World Championship defense against the former Glory Lightweight champion Marat Grigorian at ONE Fight Night 13 on 4 August 2023. The pair fought on two previous occasions, with their first bout ending in a no contest and the second bout in a unanimous decision victory for Grigorian. He won the bout via unanimous decision.

On 6 January 2025, it was officially announced that Allazov was no longer the ONE Featherweight Kickboxing World Champion, with his future with the promotion up in the air.

== Titles and achievements ==
- ONE Championship
  - ONE Featherweight Kickboxing World Championship (One time; former)
    - One successful title defense
  - 2021 ONE Kickboxing Featherweight World Grand Prix Champion
  - Performance of the Night (Two times) vs. Jo Nattawut and Superbon Singha Mawynn
  - 2023 Striker of the Year Award
- K-1
  - K-1 Super Welterweight Championship
    - One successful title defense
  - 2017 K-1 World GP -70kg World Tournament Champion
- Nuit des Champions
  - 2017 NDC K-1 Rules Super Welterweight Championship (−70 kg)
    - Two successful title defenses
- World Association of Kickboxing Organizations
  - 2016 WAKO Pro World K-1 Rules Super Welterweight Championship (−70 kg)
  - 2015 WAKO Pro World K-1 Rules Middleweight Championship (−72.5 kg)
- Kunlun Fight
  - 2015 Kunlun Fight World Max Group H Tournament Winner
- A1
  - 2015 A1 World Grand Prix Tournament Champion (−70 kg)
  - 2014 A1 World Grand Prix Tournament Winner (−70 kg)
- Awards
  - 2023 Combat Press "Knockout of the Year" (vs. Superbon Singha Mawynn)
  - 2023 Beyond Kickboxing "Fighter of the Year"
  - 2023 Beyond Kickboxing "Knockout of the Year" (vs. Superbon Singha Mawynn)

== Kickboxing record ==
Professional kickboxing record
61 wins (37 (T)KOs), 5 losses, 1 no contest
Date	Result	Opponent	Event	Location	Method	Round	Time
2023-08-05	Win	(Armenia) Marat Grigorian	ONE Fight Night 13	Bangkok, Thailand	Decision (unanimous)	5	3:00
Defends the ONE Featherweight Kickboxing World Championship.
2023-01-14	Win	(Thailand) Superbon Singha Mawynn	ONE Fight Night 6	Bangkok, Thailand	KO (punches)	2	1:03
Wins the ONE Featherweight Kickboxing World Championship.
2022-03-26	Win	(Thailand) Sitthichai Sitsongpeenong	ONE: X, Featherweight World Grand Prix Final	Kallang, Singapore	Decision (unanimous)	3	3:00
Wins the 2021 ONE Kickboxing Featherweight World Grand Prix Championship.
2022-01-28	Win	(Thailand) Jo Nattawut	ONE: Only the Brave, Featherweight World Grand Prix Semi-finals	Kallang, Singapore	KO (left hook)	1	1:55
2021-10-15	Win	(France) Samy Sana	ONE Championship: First Strike, Featherweight World Grand Prix Quarter-final	Kallang, Singapore	KO (punch to the body)	1	0:39
2021-04-07	Loss	(Germany) Enriko Kehl	ONE on TNT	Kallang, Singapore	Decision (split)	3	3:00
2019-10-12	Win	(Thailand) Sudsakorn Sor Klinmee	Bellator Kickboxing 12	Rome, Italy	Decision (unanimous)	3	3:00
2018-11-24	Win	(Belgium) Mohamed Hendouf	Nuit Des Champions	France	Decision (unanimous)	5	3:00
Defends the NDC Super Welterweight (-70 kg) Championship.
2018-07-14	Loss	(Italy) Giorgio Petrosyan	Bellator Kickboxing 10	Milan, Italy	Decision (unanimous)	5	3:00
2018-04-08	Win	(Romania) Claudiu Bădoi	Duel 3	Paris, France	KO (right hook to the body)	2	2:57
2018-03-21	Win	(Japan) Hinata Watanabe	K-1 World GP 2018: K'FESTA.1	Saitama, Japan	KO (left hook)	2	0:23
Defends the K-1 Super Welterweight (-70 kg) Championship.
2018-01-28	Win	(Thailand) Sudsakorn Sor Klinmee	Thai Boxe Mania	Turin, Italy	Decision (unanimous)	3	3:00
2017-11-25	Win	(Suriname) Cedric Manhoef	Nuit Des Champions 2017	Marseille, France	Decision (unanimous)	5	3:00
Defends the NDC Super Welterweight (-70 kg) Championship.
2017-08-05	Win	(Russia) Dzhabar Askerov	Wu Lin Feng - Yi Long challenge Tournament Tournament Semi-final	Zhengzhou, China	Decision (unanimous)	3	3:00
2017-06-18	Win	(Japan) Yasuhiro Kido	K-1 World GP 2017 Super Welterweight Championship Tournament, Final	Tokyo, Japan	Decision (unanimous)	3	3:00
Wins the K-1 Super Welterweight (-70 kg) Championship and the K-1 World GP -70kg World Tournament title.
2017-06-18	Win	(Netherlands) Jordann Pikeur	K-1 World GP 2017 Super Welterweight Championship Tournament, Semi-finals	Tokyo, Japan	KO (right hook)	1	2:17
2017-06-18	Win	(Japan) Hiroki Nakajima	K-1 World GP 2017 Super Welterweight Championship Tournament, Quarter-finals	Tokyo, Japan	KO (left uppercut)	2	1:18
2017-04-01	Win	(Thailand) Saiyok Pumpanmuang	Wu Lin Feng - Yi Long challenge Tournament 1/4 finals 1	Zhengzhou, China	Decision (unanimous)	3	3:00
2017-03-25	Win	(Morocco) Mohamed Hendouf	Victory – ACB KB9: Showdown in Paris	Paris, France	Decision (unanimous)	3	3:00
2017-01-28	Win	(France) Karim Allous	Thai Boxe Mania 2017	Turin, Italy	KO (right high kick)	1	1:00
2016-11-19	Win	(France) Bruce Codron	Nuit Des Champions 2016	Paris, France	KO (left high kick and punches)	4	1:04
Wins the NDC Super Welterweight (-70 kg) Championship.
2016-06-24	Win	(Germany) Enriko Kehl	Monte-Carlo Fighting Masters	Monte Carlo, Monaco	KO (right hook)	5	2:57
Wins the WAKO-Pro World Super Lightweight (-70 kg) K-1 Rules Championship.
2016-04-16	Win	(China) Wu Sihan	Oktagon 2016: Turin	Turin, Italy	TKO	1	
2016-01-30	Win	(Angola) Christian Baya	Thai Boxe Mania 2016	Turin, Italy	Decision (unanimous)	3	3:00
2015-11-28	Win	(France) Djimé Coulibaly	Venum Victory World Series	Paris, France	Decision (unanimous)	5	3:00
Wins the WAKO-Pro World Middleweight (-72.5 kg) K-1 Rules Championship.
2015-10-15	Win	(France) Édouard Bernadou	Partouche Kickboxing Tour, Final	Lyon, France	Decision (unanimous)	3	3:00
Wins the A1 World Grand Prix Tournament title.
2015-10-15	Win	(France) Ludovic Millet	Partouche Kickboxing Tour, Semi-finals	Lyon, France	Decision (unanimous)	3	3:00
2015-07-31	Win	(France) Kevin Renahy	Partouche Kickboxing Tour, Final 8	Marseille, France	KO (straight punch)	3	
Qualified to A1 World Grand Prix Tournament Final.
2015-07-31	Win	(France) Michael Pignolo	Partouche Kickboxing Tour, Final 16	Marseille, France	KO (head kick)	2	1:59
2015-05-30	Win	(Croatia) Ivan Vladimir	Obracun U Ringu 13	Split, Croatia	TKO (knee to the body)	2	
2015-03-17	Win	(Germany) Juri Kehl	Kunlun Fight 21 - World MAX 2015 Group H Tournament Final	Sanya, China	Decision (unanimous)	3	3:00
Qualified to Kunlun Fight 2015 70kg World MAX Tournament Final 16.
2015-03-17	Win	(Morocco) Mustapha Haida	Kunlun Fight 21 - World MAX 2015 Group H Tournament Semi-finals	Sanya, China	Decision (unanimous)	3	3:00
2014-12-18	Win	(France) Jordan Levrat	Victory 2, K-1 Rules	Levallois, France	KO (head kick)	2	0:19
2014-10-23	Win	(France) Abdallah Mabel	A1 World Grand Prix Tournament Final	Lyon, France	Decision (unanimous)	3	3:00
Wins the A1 World Grand Prix Tournament title.
2014-10-23	Win	(Morocco) Wallid Haddad	A1 World Grand Prix Tournament Semi-finals	Lyon, France	Decision (unanimous)	3	3:00
2014-09-13	Win	(Georgia (country)) Romeo Gablaya	Tatneft Cup 2014	Kazan, Russia	TKO (corner stoppage)	2	
2014-06-15	Win	(Romania) Cristian Milea	MixFighter "New Horizont"	Minsk, Belarus	Decision (unanimous)	3	3:00
2014-01-25	Loss	(Thailand) Sitthichai Sitsongpeenong	Thai Boxe Mania	Turin, Italy	Ext. R. decision (unanimous)	4	3:00
2013-12-14	Loss	(Armenia) Marat Grigorian	Victory	Levallois-Perret, France	Decision (unanimous)	3	3:00
2013-11-08	Win	(South Africa) Warren Stevelmans	Legend Fighting Show 2	Moscow, Russia	Decision (unanimous)	3	3:00
2013-04-20	NC	(Armenia) Marat Grigorian	Glory 7: Milan	Milan, Italy	NC (Allazov cut by illegal elbow)	1	
2013-02-22	Win	(Azerbaijan) Alim Nabiev	Knockout Show	Moscow, Russia	Decision (unanimous)	3	3:00
2012-11-18	Win	(Ukraine) Sergey Kulyaba	Mustang Fight Show	Minsk, Belarus	Decision (unanimous)	3	3:00
2012-05-05	Win	(Italy) Alessandro Campagna	La Notte Dei Campioni	Seregno, Italy	KO (punch)	1	
2012-04-12	Win	(Ukraine) Dmitriy Rudenko	Fight Code	Minsk, Belarus	Decision (unanimous)	3	3:00
2012-03-24	Win	(Thailand) Bovy Sor Udomson	Oktagon 2012	Milan, Italy	KO (knee)	1	2:59
2012-01-05	Win	(Turkey) Erkan Varol	Thai Boxe Mania	Turin, Italy	Decision (unanimous)	3	3:00
2011-12-19	Win	(Austria) Martin Anwar	Mustang Fight Show	Minsk, Belarus	KO		
2011-10-15	Win	(France) Raouf Beliouz	TK2 World Max 2011: Fight Code Dragon Series 2011 Part 4 Final 8	Marseille, France	TKO (doctor stoppage)	2	
2011-08-14	Win	(Hungary) Gabor Gorbics	Fight Code	Debrecen, Hungary	KO	2	
2011-06-10	Win	(Turkey) Guven Akiyev	Fight Code	Istanbul, Turkey	TKO (punches)	1	2:25
2011-03-12	Win	(Italy) Federik Pacini	MixFighter "New Horizont"	Milan, Italy	KO	1	
2011-02-05	Win	(Slovakia) Rudolf Durica	Ring Of Honor, NBB2	Nitra, Slovakia	Decision (unanimous)	3	3:00
2011	Win	(Belarus) Egor Zibrov	Fighting show "Octopus"	Minsk, Belarus	KO	1	
2011	Win	(Belarus) Artur Isayan	Fighting show "Octopus"	Minsk, Belarus	Decision	5	3:00
2010-12-17	Loss	(Ukraine) Konstantin Trishin	KOK World GP 2010 in Dnipropetrovsk, Semi-Finals	Dnipropetrovsk, Ukraine	Decision	3	3:00
2010-12-17	Win	(Russia) Aleksey Sherban	KOK World GP 2010 in Dnipropetrovsk, Quarter-Finals	Dnipropetrovsk, Ukraine	Decision (unanimous)	3	3:00
2010-10-07	Win	(Moldova) Maxim Răilean	Fighting show "Octopus"	Minsk, Belarus	KO (liver shot)	2	
2010	Win	(Slovenia) Jakub Safarik	Collision	Prague, Czech Republic	KO	1	0:15
Legend: Win Loss Draw/no contest Notes

Amateur kickboxing record
Date	Result	Opponent	Event	Location	Method	Round	Time
2011-04-29	Win	(Kazakhstan) Medet Rakhimov	2011 IFMA European Championships, Tournament Final	Istanbul, Turkey	KO (left hook)	1	
Wins the 2011 IFMA European Championships -63.5 Gold Medal.
2011-04-27	Win	(Russia) Zaur Abdulsalamov	2011 IFMA European Championships, Tournament Final	Istanbul, Turkey	Decision (unanimous)	3	2:00
2011-04-25	Win	(Ukraine) Roman Mailov	2011 IFMA European Championships, Tournament Quarterfinal	Istanbul, Turkey	Decision (unanimous)	3	2:00
2010-10	Loss	(Belarus) Maxim Maruga	2010 Belarus Muaythai Championships, Tournament Final	Minsk, Belarus	Decision (unanimous)	3	3:00
Wins the 2010 Belarus Muaythai Championships -63.5 Silver Medal.
Legend: Win Loss Draw/no contest Notes

== See also ==
- List of ONE Championship champions
- List of K-1 champions
- List of male kickboxers
