= Hinata (kickboxer) =

Japanese kickboxer

Hinata Watanabe
- Born: August 26, 1986 (age 40); Hiratsuka, Japan
- Native name: 渡辺日菜太
- Other names: Rising Sun HINATA
- Nationality: Japanese
- Height: 1.81 m (5 ft 11 1/2 in)
- Weight: 70 kg (154 lb; 11 st 0 lb)
- Division: Welterweight
- Style: Karate, Kickboxing
- Stance: Southpaw
- Fighting out of: Hiratsuka, Japan
- Team: Shonan Kakuto Club
- Years active: 2005-present

Kickboxing record
- Total: 74
- Wins: 50
- By knockout: 17
- Losses: 23
- By knockout: 8
- Draws: 1
- Last updated on: November 15, 2013

Hinata Watanabe (born August 26, 1986 in Hiratsuka), or HINATA, is a Japanese welterweight kickboxer fighting out of Hiratsuka, Japan for the Shonan Kakuto Club. He is the 2008 R.I.S.E. champion currently competing in R.I.S.E. and K-1 MAX.

== Biography and career ==
Hinata made his pro debut with RISE at the G-Bazooka Tournament event in 2005 losing in a non-tournament match. Over the next couple of years he had a fairly unspectacular fight record on the local circuit winning nine and losing six between 2005 and 2007. He had his first taste of success in 2008 winning a playoff at R.I.S.E. 46 to earn himself a shot at the organizations middleweight title, against a fighter who had defeated Hinata the previous year, at R.I.S.E. 48. This time Hinata would have his revenge, beating Ryuji to win the R.I.S.E. middleweight title -70 kg. As champion he had an additional bonus - qualifying for the following year's K-1 MAX Japan tournament – as R.I.S.E. was a feeder for the larger K-1 organization.

In 2009 Hinata entered the annual K-1 World MAX Japan tournament with the victor having a chance at qualification for the K-1 World MAX final later that year. Hinata caused an upset by defeating the reigning K-1 MAX Japan champion Yasuhiro Kido by decision in the quarter-finals. This victory did, however, come at a cost, with the young fighter being unable to continue in the tournament due to a broken nose suffered in the win. His performances at the K-1 MAX Japan lead to him being called up for a super fight at the K-1 World MAX 2009 Final 8 where he lost to The Contender Asia Series 1 fighter Dzhabar Askerov. He made a further appearance for K-1 before the end of the year at the K-1 World MAX 2009 Final in another super fight, this time shocking MAX regular and multiple world champion Mike Zambidis by taking a unanimous victory.

Hinata re-entered the K-1 World MAX Japan 2010 where he defeated 2009 K-1 World MAX semi-finalist Yuya Yamamoto in the quarter-finals before losing by knockout to Hiroki Nakajima under one minute. As a result, he did not qualify for the MAX final. In his next fight, he gained international attention by defeating Artur Kyshenko by technical knockout with a crescent kick. Following this bout, he was ranked 12th in the international middleweight division by HeadkickLegend in its October 2010 rankings.

He lost to Warren Stevelmans via unanimous decision (30-28, 28-27 and 29-28) at Shootboxing 2012 - Act 4 on September 17, 2012 in Tokyo, Japan, failing to qualify for the 2012 S-Cup.

Hinata knocked out Norihisa Amimoto in round two at REBELS.13 on October 28, 2012.

He rematched Andy Ristie in a reserve bout at the Shoot Boxing World Tournament 2012 in Tokyo, Japan on November 17, 2012 and lost by TKO in the first round once again.

He beat Masatoshi Hyakutake by unanimous decision at Shoot Boxing 2013 - Act 1 in Tokyo on February 22, 2013.

He defeated Takuma Konishi via unanimous decision for the vacant REBELS BLACK Super Welterweight Championship at REBELS 15 in Tokyo on April 14, 2013.

He knocked out Kanai Kenji with a second round high kick at Shootboxing 2013 - Act 3 in Tokyo on June 23, 2013.

He stopped Johann Fauveau with low kicks in round three at Glory 10: Los Angeles - Middleweight World Championship Tournament in Ontario, California, United States on September 28, 2013.

He defeated Josh Jauncey by unanimous decision at Shoot Boxing Battle Summit Ground Zero Tokyo 2013 in Tokyo, Japan on November 15, 2013.

== Titles ==
- REBELS
  - 2013 REBELS BLACK Super Welterweight Championship (1 title defence)
- RISE
  - 2008 RISE Middleweight (-70 kg) Champion

Awards

- eFight.jp
  - 2x Fighter of the Month (September 2015, February 2019)

== Kickboxing record ==
Kickboxing record
50 Wins (17 (T)KO's), 23 Losses
Date	Result	Opponent	Event	Location	Method	Round	Time	Record
2022-03-12	Win	(Cambodia) Saksith	KNOCK OUT 2022 vol.2	Tokyo, Japan	KO (Body shot)	2	1:47	50-23
2021-02-28	Loss	(Japan) Kaito	REBELS ～The FINAL～	Tokyo, Japan	Decision (Majority)	3	3:00	49-23
Loses the REBELS BLACK Super Welterweight Championship.
2020-09-12	Win	(Japan) Hijiri Tamura	KNOCK OUT CHAMPIONSHIP.2	Tokyo, Japan	KO (Left Middle Kick)	1	2:49	49-22
2020-02-11	Win	(Australia) Daniel Marshall	KNOCK OUT CHAMPIONSHIP.1	Tokyo, Japan	Decision (Unanimous)	3	3:00	48-22
2019-11-01	Win	(Thailand) Raseasing Weerasakreck	KNOCK OUT 2019 BREAKING DAWN	Tokyo, Japan	Decision	5	3:00	47-22
2019-08-18	Loss	(Thailand) Jomthong Chuwattana	K.O CLIMAX 2019 SUMMER KICK FEVER	Tokyo, Japan	Decision	3	3:00	46-21
2019-06-09	Win	(Japan) Yuki Sakamoto	REBELS.61	Tokyo, Japan	Extra Round Decision	4	3:00	46-20
2019-02-17	Win	(Thailand) Sibmean Sitchefboontham	PANCRASE REBELS RING.1	Tokyo, Japan	KO (Low Kicks)	3	0:26	45-20
Defends the REBELS BLACK Super Welterweight Championship.
2018-10-08	Win	(Japan) Tsukuru Midorikawa	REBELS.58	Tokyo, Japan	Decision (majority)	3	3:00	44-20
2018-03-21	Loss	(Belarus) Chingiz Allazov	K-1 World GP 2018: K'FESTA.1	Saitama, Japan	KO (Left Hook)	2	0:23	43-20
For the K-1 Super Middleweight Championship.
2017-12-27	Win	(Japan) Hirono Yu	K-1 Survival Wars	Tokyo, Japan	Decision (Majority)	3	3:00	43-19
2017-09-18	Win	(Spain) Sergio Sanchez	K-1 World GP 2016 -67.5kg World Tournament, Superfight	Tokyo, Japan	Decision (unanimous)	3	3:00	42-19
2017-06-18	Loss	(Netherlands) Jordann Pikeur	K-1 World GP 2017 Super Middleweight Championship Tournament, Quarter-finals	Tokyo, Japan	Decision (Unanimous)	3	3:00	41-19
2017-02-25	Win	(Japan) Shintaro Matsukura	K-1 World GP 2017 Lightweight Championship Tournament	Tokyo, Japan	Decision (Unanimous)	3	3:00	41-18
2016-11-30	Win	(Japan) Akihiro Gono	REBELS.47	Tokyo, Japan	KO	2	2:43	40-18
2016-08-07	Win	(Netherlands) Albert Kraus	Kunlun Fight 49 / Rebels 45	Tokyo, Japan	Decision (unanimous)	3	3:00	39-18
2016-06-01	Win	(Netherlands) Redouan Daoudi	REBELS.43	Tokyo, Japan	Decision	3	3:00	38-18
2016-03-09	Loss	(Netherlands) Mohamed Mezouari	Rebels. 41	Tokyo, Japan	Decision (Unanimous)	3	3:00	37-18
2015-12-29	Win	(Japan) Kazuyuki Miyata	Rizin World Grand-Prix 2015:Part 1 - Saraba	Saitama, Japan	TKO (punches)	1	2:15	37-17
2015-09-16	Win	(Netherlands) Andy Souwer	Rebels. 38	Tokyo, Japan	Decision (Unanimous)	3	3:00	36-17
2015-06-14	Win	(Iran) Vahid Roshani	WSR SUK WEERASAKRECK IX	Japan	Decision (Unanimous)	3	3:00	35-17
2015-03-04	Win	(Ukraine) Roman Mailov	Rebels 34	Tokyo, Japan	Decision (unanimous)	3	3:00	34-17
2014-12-29	Win	(Japan) Yuichiro Nagashima	Blade 1	Tokyo, Japan	Decision (Unanimous)	3	3:00	33-16
2014-10-26	Win	(Japan) Yu Hirono	REBELS.31	Tokyo, Japan	Decision (Split)	5	3:00	32-16
2014-07-12	Loss	(Slovenia) Samo Petje	R.I.S.E. 100 -BLADE 0-	Tokyo, Japan	TKO (referee stoppage)	2	2:00	31-16
2014-03-16	Win	(Japan) Kentaro Hokuto	REBELS 25	Tokyo, Japan	KO	2	1:23	31-15
Defends the REBELS BLACK Super Welterweight Championship.
2014-01-26	Win	(South Korea) Sijun Jin	REBELS 23	Tokyo, Japan	Decision (unanimous)	3	3:00	31-15
2013-11-15	Win	(Canada) Josh Jauncey	Shoot Boxing Battle Summit Ground Zero Tokyo 2013	Tokyo, Japan	Decision (unanimous)	3	3:00	30-15
2013-09-28	Win	(France) Johann Fauveau	Glory 10: Los Angeles	Ontario, California, USA	TKO (low kicks)	3	0:48	29-15
2013-06-23	Win	(Japan) Kanai Kenji	Shootboxing 2013 - Act 3	Tokyo, Japan	KO (left high kick)	2	1:10	28-15
2013-04-14	Win	(Japan) Takuma Konishi	REBELS.15	Tokyo, Japan	Decision (unanimous)	3	3:00	27-15
Wins the REBELS BLACK Super Welterweight Championship.
2013-02-22	Win	(Japan) Masatoshi Hyakutake	Shoot Boxing 2013 - Act 1	Tokyo, Japan	Decision (unanimous)	3	3:00	26-15
2012-11-17	Loss	(Suriname) Andy Ristie	Shoot Boxing World Tournament 2012, Reserve Bout	Tokyo, Japan	TKO (referee stoppage)	1	2:31	25-14
2012-10-28	Win	(Japan) Norihisa Amimoto	REBELS.13	Tokyo, Japan	KO (left cross)	2	1:52	25-13
2012-09-19	Loss	(South Africa) Warren Stevelmans	Shootboxing 2012 - Act 4	Tokyo, Japan	Decision (unanimous)	3	3:00	24-13
2012-07-29	Win	(Korea) Kang Jeong-U	IT’S SHOWTIME JAPAN countdown-2	Tokyo, Japan	KO (Left high kick)	1	1:24	24-12
2012-06-02	Loss	(Netherlands) Henri Opstal	RISE 88	Tokyo, Japan	KO (Right high kick)	3	0:19	23-12
2012-04-15	Win	(Japan) Zen Fujita	REBELS.11	Tokyo, Japan	TKO (3 Knockdowns)	2	2:42	23-11
2012-01-28	Loss	(Suriname) Andy Ristie	It's Showtime 2012 in Leeuwarden	Leeuwarden, Netherlands	TKO (referee stoppage)	1	1:58	22-11
2011-10-23	Win	(South Korea) Baek Min-Cheol	REBELS.9 & It's Showtime Japan 4	Tokyo, Japan	KO (Body Kick)	1	1.01	22-10
2011-07-18	Loss	(Italy) Giorgio Petrosyan	REBELS 8 & It's Showtime Japan 1	Tokyo, Japan	Decision (Unanimous)	3	3:00	21-10
2011-04-17	Win	(Brazil) Danilo Zanolini	SNKA TITANS NEOS IX	Tokyo, Japan	Decision (Unanimous)	3	3:00	21-9
2011-01-23	Win	(South Korea) Woo Yong Choi	REBELS-EX: Hinata's Wave	Tokyo, Japan	KO (Left High Kick)	3	0:15	20-9
2010-11-08	Win	(Brazil) Andre "Dida" Amade	K-1 World MAX 2010 Final, Super Fight	Tokyo, Japan	Decision (Unanimous)	3	3:00	19-9
2010-09-18	Loss	(Netherlands) Andy Souwer	Shoot Boxing "Ishin 4"	Tokyo, Japan	KO (Choke)	1	0:48	18-9
2010-07-31	Win	(Ukraine) Artur Kyshenko	KRS: "RISE 68"	Tokyo, Japan	TKO (Left Middle Kick)	3	1:23	18-8
2010-03-27	Loss	(Japan) Hiroki Nakajima	K-1 World MAX 2010 Japan, Semi-finals	Saitama, Japan	KO (Right Hook)	1	0:58	17-8
2010-03-27	Win	(Japan) Yuya Yamamoto	K-1 World MAX 2010 Japan, Quarter-finals	Saitama, Japan	Decision (Unanimous)	3	3:00	17-7
2010-01-24	Win	(South Korea) Doo Suk Oh	R.I.S.E. 61	Tokyo, Japan	Decision (Unanimous)	3	3:00	16-7
2009-10-26	Win	(Greece) Mike Zambidis	K-1 World MAX 2009 Final, Super Fight	Yokohama, Japan	Decision (Unanimous)	3	3:00	15-7
2009-07-13	Loss	(Russia) Dzhabar Askerov	K-1 World MAX 2009 Final 8, Super Fight	Tokyo, Japan	Ext.R Decision (Unanimous)	4	3:00	14-7
2009-02-23	Win	(Japan) Yasuhiro Kido	K-1 World MAX 2009 Japan, Quarter-finals	Tokyo, Japan	Ext.R Decision (Unanimous)	4	3:00	14-6
Despite victory has to withdraw from tournament due to injury.
2008-11-30	Win	(Japan) Hayato	R.I.S.E. 51	Tokyo, Japan	Decision (Unanimous)	3	3:00	13-6
2008-07-04	Win	(Japan) Ryuji	R.I.S.E. 48 - The King Of Gladiators '08	Tokyo, Japan	Decision (Unanimous)	3	3:00	12-6
Wins R.I.S.E. middleweight title -70 kg and qualifies for K-1 World MAX 2009 Japan.
2008-05-11	Win	(Japan) Yasuhito Shirasu	R.I.S.E. 46 - The King Of Gladiators '08	Tokyo, Japan	Decision (Unanimous)	3	3:00	11-6
Qualifies for R.I.S.E. middleweight title fight.
2008-02-22	Win	(Japan) Hideki Mizutani	R.I.S.E. -γ- "ROC"	Japan	Decision (Unanimous)	3	3:00	10-6
2007-12-16	Loss	(Japan) Ryuji	R.I.S.E. Dead or Alive tournament '07, Semi-finals	Japan	KO (Right Hook)	2	1:40	9-6
2007-12-16	Win	(Japan) Kenshi	R.I.S.E. Dead or Alive tournament '07, Quarter-finals	Japan	Decision (Unanimous)	3	3:00	9-5
2007-10-28	Win	(Japan) Mikoto	R.I.S.E. Last Survival '07	Japan	Decision (Unanimous)	3	3:00	8-5
2007-09-?	Win	(Thailand)	Rajadamnern Stadium	Bangkok, Thailand	KO			7-5
2007-07-22	Loss	(Japan) Crazy884	R.I.S.E. 38	Tokyo, Japan	Ext.R Decision (Unanimous)	4	3:00	6-5
2007-04-29	Win	(Japan) Hideya Tanaka	R.I.S.E. 35	Japan	Decision (Unanimous)	3	3:00	6-4
2007-02-11	Loss	(Japan) Masakazu Watanabe	J-Network "J-Fight 14" tournament, 1st round	Japan	Decision (Majority)	3	3:00	5-4
2006-12-17	Win	(Japan) Hiroyuki Owatarti	R.I.S.E. Dead or Alive tournament '06, Opening Fight	Tokyo, Japan	Decision (Unanimous)	3	3:00	5-3
2006-10-29	Loss	(Japan) Naoki Tashima	R.I.S.E. 30	Japan	KO (Straight Left)	1	0:38	4-3
2006-09-01	Loss	(Japan) Koji	J-Network "Mach Go! Go!" Strongest Tournament, 1st round	Japan	Ext.R Decision (Unanimous)	4	3:00	4-2
2006-05-28	Win	(Japan) Kenta	R.I.S.E. 26	Japan	KO (Punch)	3	2:17	4-1
2006-04-16	Win	(Japan) NIIZUMAX!	J-Network "J-Fight 9"	Japan	Decision (Unanimous)	3	3:00	3-1
2006-01-04	Win	(Japan) Kino Otaru	A.J.K.F. "New Years Festival" '06, Opening Fight	Japan	KO	1	1:23	2-1
2005-09-18	Win	(Japan) Motoe Takahashi Nozomi	Trial League 3	Japan	Decision (Unanimous)	3	3:00	1-1
2005-06-19	Loss	(Japan) Hideaki Yoshikawa	R.I.S.E. G-Bazooka Tournament '05, Opening Fight	Japan	Decision (Unanimous)	3	3:00	0-1
Legend: Win Loss Draw/No contest Notes

== See also ==
- List of male kickboxers
- List of K-1 Events
