= Jordan Watson =

English kickboxer (born 1987)

- Born: 4 December 1987 (age 38); Leeds, England
- Other names: Quadzilla
- Height: 1.73 m (5 ft 8 in)
- Weight: 70.0 kg (154.3 lb; 11.02 st)
- Division: Welterweight; Middleweight
- Style: Muay Thai
- Stance: Orthodox
- Team: Bad Company Thai Boxing Gym; Jitti Gym
- Trainer: Richard Smith
- Years active: 2000–present

Kickboxing record
- Total: 69
- Wins: 52
- By knockout: 22
- Losses: 15
- By knockout: 5
- Draws: 2
- Last updated on: 8 August 2021

Jordan Watson (born 4 December 1987) is an English Muay Thai kickboxer who competes in the middleweight division. A powerful kicker, Watson began training in Muay Thai at six years old with Richard Smith at Bad Company, Leeds, UK and first came to prominence when he reached the final of the K-1 UK MAX Tournament 2007 Pain & Glory at nineteen. He won the ISKA World Super Welterweight Muay Thai Championship in 2010 and then found further recognition the following year by finishing as runner-up on The Challenger Muay Thai reality television show. He began fighting for Glory in 2012. He is the first ever and current Yokkao -70 kg champion.

== Career ==
Jordan Watson started Muay Thai training at the age of six with Richard Smith at Bad Company Thai Boxing Gym where he is a training partner of Liam Harrison. He had over seventy fights and won eight titles during his amateur career and turned professional as a seventeen-year-old in 2004.

Having built up an undefeated record on the British Muay Thai scene, Watson made his first foray into Oriental kickboxing rules and his K-1 debut at the K-1 UK MAX Tournament 2007 Pain & Glory in London, England, on 20 May 2007. After outpointing Killy Guelladrss in the quarter-finals and knocking out Harvey Harra in the semis, he suffered the first loss of his professional career at the hands of Sophiane Allouche in the tournament final. He was floored twice by the Algerian in round two, forcing the referee to stop the fight. In November 2008, he won the UK qualifying tournament for the second season of The Contender Asia in Watford, England, taking decision wins over Tim Thomas and Craig Jose before stopping Chris Shaw in the final. The show was cancelled due to financial difficulties, however.

After wins over international opponents such as Halim Haryouli and Kouider Oukbi in 2009, Watson took a big step up in class to fight Buakaw Por. Pramuk at MSA Muaythai Premier League 3 in London on 29 May 2010. He was dropped with a body shot in round three and lost the fight by unanimous decision, although he gave a good account of himself against the vastly more experienced Buakaw. He rebounded with a second round technical knockout win over former Rajadamnern Stadium champion Hino Kiatti in Blackpool, England, on 2 October 2010 before facing Toshiya Nakagawa for the vacant ISKA World Super Welterweight (-69.5 kg/153.2 lb) Muay Thai Championship on 20 November 2010 in Birmingham, England. He knocked Nakagawa down with a high kick in round three and won a clear-cut unanimous decision to take the title. Watson ended the year by competing at the 2010 edition of the King's Cup in Bangkok, Thailand on 5 December 2010. He defeated Antuan Siangboxing on points in the quarter-finals but lost to eventual champion Yodsanklai Fairtex by the same margin in the semis.

Watson made the first defence of his ISKA world title against Cédric Muller at Siam Warriors in Cork, Ireland on 16 April 2011. Utilizing damaging low kicks and crisp boxing, Watson won by unanimous decision and retained the belt. He then joined the short-lived Muaythai Premier League and, in his only appearance in the promotion, lost to Ky Hollenbeck by unanimous decision after being floored with a spinning backfist in a three-round bout at Muaythai Premier League: Strength and Honor in Padua, Italy, on 8 October 2011. Towards the end of the year, Watson joined the cast of The Challenger Muay Thai reality television show, the unofficial successor to The Contender Asia, in Kuala Lumpur, Malaysia. The format of the show consisted of sixteen middleweights fighting in a tournament for a $100,000 prize. He defeated Cyrus Washington, Cédric Muller in a rematch, and Mostafa Abdollahi over sixteen weeks on the road to the final where he faced Tum Mardsua in December 2011. Both fighters exchanged throws and Mardsua cut Watson badly with an elbow in round four. After five rounds, all three judges awarded the fight to Mardsua.

On 3 April 2012, Watson competed in the WMC Grand Prix at -72 kg/158 lb in Bangkok. He met Ilya Grad in the semi-finals and the Israeli was content to trade kicks with the – by consensus – vastly superior kicker in Watson. Watson looked comfortable, however, and sailed through the three, two-minute rounds with a points decision and went up against Saiyok Pumpanmuang in the final. Saiyok fought aggressively as is typical of his style and Watson was more than willing to oblige as the pair exchanged kicks, punches, knees and elbows for five rounds. At one point, Saiyok caught Watson with an elbow that resulted in the loss of some of his teeth. In the end, it was the Thai who did enough to take home a decision victory it what was a close and exciting fight. When Andy Souwer withdrew from his fight with Johann Fauveau at Urban Boxing United in Marseille, France, on 19 May 2012, Watson replaced the Dutchman in the ISKA World Super Welterweight (-69.5 kg/153.2 lb) Oriental Championship match. Fauveau won by decision to take the vacant belt. He was set to fight Aikpracha Meenayothin in the WMC Prince's Cup 2012 in Bangkok in July 2012 but was replaced by Marco Piqué for undisclosed reasons. Watson put an end to his two-fight losing streak when he won a decision over Hamed Hassan in a three rounder at Thai Fight: Leicester 2012 in Leicester, England, on 17 August 2012. Having signed with the Glory kickboxing organization in August that year, Watson made his promotional debut in a non-tournament bout at Glory 3: Rome - 2012 70 kg Slam Final 8 in Rome, Italy, on 3 November 2012, relying mostly on his kicks as he took a unanimous decision over Mustapha Haida. Watson's fight with Aikpracha Meenayothin finally came to fruition on 15 December 2012 in Bangkok for the WPMF sanctioned World Fighter Spirit -71 kg/156 lb World Championship. Aikpracha cut him after landing elbows and a big knee in the second, and pressed home his advantage in the third, managing to trip and dump the Englishman several times. Round four saw Watson land the right body kick on Aikpracha several times and he pressed on in the fifth, but was visibly tired by the strength of his opponent, who threw him to the canvas a couple more times. The Thai did enough to take the judges' decision and the belt, despite missing the contracted weight.

In yet another close but unsuccessful fight with a top Thai, Watson fought to a draw with Kem Sitsongpeenong in a three-round bout at Yokkao Extreme 2013 on 26 January 2013 in Milan, Italy. He made his return to kickboxing and his sophomore appearance in Glory at Glory 5: London on 23 March 2013, defeating Steve Moxon by unanimous decision. He was initially scheduled to rematch with Aikpracha Meenayothin at MAX Muay Thai 3 in Zhengzhou, China on 10 August 2013 but his opponent was instead changed to Sitthichai Sitsongpeenong, and Watson lost by way of a controversial decision. He had a scheduled match with Albert Kraus at Glory 10: Los Angeles - World Middleweight Championship Tournament in Ontario, California, United States on 28 September 2013 but was unable to compete due to visa issues and was replaced by Ky Hollenbeck.

Watson was scheduled to fight Enriko Kehl at Siam Warriors: Revolution on Leeside in Cork on 1 March 2014 but Enriko withdrew from the fight for undisclosed reasons and was replaced by his brother Juri. Watson defeated Kehl via high kick KO in the first round. On 11 October 2014, Watson defeated French veteran Mickael Piscitello via low kick KO in the third round at Yokkao 10 to win the inaugural Yokkao -70 kg world title.

On 21 March 2015, Watson failed to defend his yokkao title against an up-and-coming Swedish fighter Sanny Dahlbeck. He lose in the 4th round via three knockdown rule. On 10 October 2015, Watson bounced back from the defeat by dominating the whole fight against K1 GP Finalist Jordann Pikeur. After almost two months, Watson dominated former Challenger Muay thai reality television co-competitor Faizal Ramli via points, and avenged his loss to Challenger Muay thai reality television champion Tum Mardsua to win the Z1 Royal Cup 72.5 kg Tournament. After a year, he fought yokkao champion Sanny Dahlbeck for the second time. Watson successfully avenged his loss and regained the yokkao title in a five-round exciting fight. On 8 October 2016, he defeated top English muay thai fighter Ben Hodge via points. On 10 December 2016, Watson lose via referee stoppage to #3 lightweight fighter in the world, Giorgio Petrosyan in Bellator Kickboxing: Florence.

On 25 March 2017, Watson came back to defend his yokkao title against Thai fighter Sorgraw Petchyindee. He won via unanimous decision. On 15 October 2017, he faced former Lumpinee champion Pongsiri PKSaenchaimuaythaigym. Watson won via KO (Head Kick) in the second round, retaining his 70 kg yokkao title.

== Championships and awards ==
=== Kickboxing ===
- The Challenger Muay Thai
  - The Challenger Muay Thai Tournament Runner-up
- The Contender Asia
  - The Contender Asia UK Tournament Championship
- International Sport Karate Association
  - ISKA World Super Welterweight (-69.5 kg/153.2 lb) Muay Thai Championship
- K-1
  - K-1 UK MAX Tournament 2007 Pain & Glory Runner-up
- World Muaythai Council
  - WMC Grand Prix Runner-up
- Yokkao
  - Yokkao -70 kg World Champion
- Z1 International
  - Z1 8th Royal Cup -72.5 kg Tournament Champion

== Fight record ==
Muay Thai and Kickboxing record
52 wins (22 KOs), 17 losses, 2 draws
Date	Result	Opponent	Event	Location	Method	Round	Time
2026-02-28	Loss	(Cyprus) Panicos Yusuf	Hitman Fight League	Manchester, England	Decision	3	3:00
2022-05-08	Loss	(Thailand) Saiyok Pumpanmuang	THAI FIGHT Sung Noen	Sung Noen district, Thailand	Decision	3	3:00
2021-08-08	Win	(Spain) Fran Valderrama	Yokkao 50	Bolton, England	Decision (unanimous)	5	3:00
2019-05-25	Loss	(Italy) Armen Petrosyan	Oktagon	Italy	KO (Right Cross)	1	2:51
2018-10-27	Loss	(Germany) Enriko Kehl	Enfusion Live	Germany	Decision (unanimous)	3	3:00
2017-11-11	Loss	(Netherlands) Endy Semeleer	Enfusion Live 55 Final 16	Amsterdam	TKO	4	
2017-10-15	Win	(Thailand) Pongsiri P.K.Saenchaimuaythaigym	Yokkao 28	Bolton, England	KO (Head Kick)	2	3:00
Retained Yokkao 70 kg title .
2017-03-25	Win	(Thailand) Sorgraw Petchyindee	Yokkao 23	Bolton, England	Decision (unanimous)	5	3:00
Retained Yokkao 70 kg title .
2016-12-10	Loss	(Italy) Giorgio Petrosyan	Bellator Kickboxing: Florence	Florence, Italy	TKO (Referee stoppage)	3	0:52
2016-10-08	Win	(England) Ben Hodge	Yokkao 20	Bolton, England	Decision (unanimous)	5	3:00
2016-03-19	Win	(Sweden) Sanny Dahlbeck	Yokkao 18	Bolton, England	Decision (unanimous)	5	3:00
Regained Yokkao 70 kg title .
2015-12-05	Win	(Thailand) Tum Mardsua	Z1 8th Royal Cup, Final	Kuala Lumpur, Malaysia	TKO (Retirement)	3	3:00
Won Z1 Royal Cup 72.5 kg Tournament
2015-12-05	Win	(Malaysia) Faizal Ramli	Z1 8th Royal Cup, Semi final	Kuala Lumpur, Malaysia	Decision (unanimous)	3	3:00
2015-10-10	Win	(Netherlands) Jordann Pikeur	Yokkao 15	England	Decision (unanimous)	5	3:00
2015-03-21	Loss	(Sweden) Sanny Dahlbeck	Yokkao 12	England	TKO (3 knockdowns)	4	3:00
Failed to retain his Yokkao 70 kg title .
2014-10-11	Win	(France) Mickael Piscitello	Yokkao 10	Bolton, England	TKO (leg injury)	3	1:18
Won Yokkao 70 kg title .
2014-03-01	Win	(Germany) Juri Kehl	Siam Warriors: Revolution on Leeside	Cork, Ireland	KO (right high kick)	1	2:37
2013-08-10	Loss	(Thailand) Sitthichai Sitsongpeenong	MAX Muay Thai 3	Zhengzhou, China	Decision	3	3:00
2013-03-23	Win	(Australia) Steve Moxon	Glory 5: London	London, England	Decision (unanimous)	3	3:00
2013-01-26	Draw	(Thailand) Kem Sitsongpeenong	Yokkao Extreme 2013	Milan, Italy	Draw	3	3:00
2012-12-15	Loss	(Thailand) Aikpracha Meenayothin	World Fighter Spirit	Bangkok, Thailand	Decision	5	3:00
For the World Fighter Spirit -71 kg/156 lb World Championship.
2012-11-03	Win	(Morocco) Mustapha Haida	Glory 3: Rome	Rome, Italy	Decision (unanimous)	3	3:00
2012-08-17	Win	(France) Hamed Hassan	Thai Fight: Leicester 2012	Leicester, England	Decision	3	3:00
2012-05-19	Loss	(France) Johann Fauveau	Urban Boxing United	Marseille, France	Decision	5	3:00
For the ISKA World Super Welterweight (-69.5 kg/153.2lb) Oriental Championship.
2012-04-03	Loss	(Thailand) Saiyok Pumpanmuang	WMC Grand Prix, Final	Bangkok, Thailand	Decision	5	3:00
For the WMC Grand Prix Championship.
2012-04-03	Win	(Israel) Ilya Grad	WMC Grand Prix, Semi Finals	Bangkok, Thailand	Decision	3	2:00
2011-12-00	Loss	(Thailand) Tum Mardsua	The Challenger Muay Thai, Final	Kuala Lumpur, Malaysia	Decision (unanimous)	5	3:00
For The Challenger Muay Thai Tournament Championship.
2011-00-00	Win	(Iran) Mostafa Abdollahi	The Challenger Muay Thai, Semi Finals	Kuala Lumpur, Malaysia	Decision	5	3:00
2011-00-00	Win	(France) Cédric Muller	The Challenger Muay Thai, Quarter Finals	Kuala Lumpur, Malaysia	Decision	5	3:00
2011-00-00	Win	(United States) Cyrus Washington	The Challenger Muay Thai, First Round	Kuala Lumpur, Malaysia	Decision	5	3:00
2011-10-08	Loss	(United States) Ky Hollenbeck	Muaythai Premier League: Strength and Honor	Padua, Italy	Decision (unanimous)	3	3:00
2011-04-16	Win	(France) Cédric Muller	Siam Warriors	Cork, Ireland	Decision (unanimous)	5	3:00
Retains the ISKA World Super Welterweight (-69.5 kg/153.2lb) Muay Thai Championship.
2010-12-05	Loss	(Thailand) Yodsanklai Fairtex	King's Cup 2010, Semi Finals	Bangkok, Thailand	Decision	3	2:00
2010-12-05	Win	(France) Antuan Siangboxing	King's Cup 2010, Quarter Finals	Bangkok, Thailand	Decision	3	2:00
2010-11-20	Win	(Japan) Toshiya Nakagawa	Muaythai Superfights	Birmingham, England	Decision (unanimous)	5	3:00
Wins the ISKA World Super Welterweight (-69.5 kg/153.2lb) Muay Thai Championship.
2010-10-02	Win	(Thailand) Hino Kiatti	England vs. the Netherlands	Blackpool, England	TKO (right low kick)	2	
2010-05-29	Loss	(Thailand) Buakaw Por. Pramuk	MSA Muaythai Premier League 3	London, England	Decision (unanimous)	5	3:00
2009-06-13	Win	(France) Kouider Oukbi	World Championship Thai Boxing	Leeds, England	TKO referee stoppage)	4	
2009-03-21	Win	(Netherlands) Halim Haryouli	ISKA Thaiboxing	Leeds, England	TKO (retirement)	2	3:00
2008-11-00	Win	(Scotland) Chris Shaw	The Contender Asia UK Tournament, Final	Watford, England	KO		
Wins The Contender Asia UK Tournament Championship.
2008-11-00	Win	(England) Craig Jose	The Contender Asia UK Tournament, Semi Finals	Watford, England	Decision	3	3:00
2008-11-00	Win	(England) Tim Thomas	The Contender Asia UK Tournament, Quarter Finals	Watford, England	Decision	3	3:00
2007-05-20	Loss	(Algeria) Sophiane Allouche	K-1 UK MAX Tournament 2007 Pain & Glory, Final	London, England	TKO (punches)	2	2:03
For the K-1 UK MAX Tournament 2007 Pain & Glory Championship.
2007-05-20	Win	(England) Harvey Harra	K-1 UK MAX Tournament 2007 Pain & Glory, Semi Finals	London, England	KO	1	
2007-05-20	Win	(France) Killy Guelladrss	K-1 UK MAX Tournament 2007 Pain & Glory, Quarter Finals	London, England	Decision	3	3:00
2006-06-17	Win	(Republic of Ireland) Seamus Cogan	World Class Professional Thai Boxing	Leeds, England	Decision	5	3:00
2005-02-27	Win	(Morocco) Mosab Amrani	Master Sken's Fight Night	Manchester, England	TKO (cut)	4	
Legend: Win Loss Draw/No contest Notes
