= Sanny Dahlbeck =

Swedish welterweight kickboxer

- Born: May 12, 1991 (age 35)
- Nationality: (Sweden) Swedish
- Height: 1.78 m (5 ft 10 in)
- Weight: 70 kg (150 lb; 11 st)
- Division: Welterweight
- Style: Kickboxing, Muay Thai
- Stance: Southpaw
- Fighting out of: Odenplan Fightgym, Sweden
- Team: Odenplan Fightgym
- Years active: 2007-present

Kickboxing record
- Total: 59
- Wins: 45
- By knockout: 28
- Losses: 14
- By knockout: 8
- Draws: 0
- Last updated on: August 17, 2013

Sanny Dahlbeck is a Swedish welterweight kickboxer fighting out of Odenplan Fightgym, Stockholm, Sweden. Being a southpaw fighter, he is particularly known for his powerful left punch and his overall finishing abilities.

== Career ==
Dahlbeck has been trained by the head coach of Slagskeppet Peter Lööf since the age of 15. Dahlbeck Was under contract with Glory World Series and he also most recently participated in their 16-man elimination tournament, making it all the way to the semi-finals where he eventually was knocked out from a body shot in the third round by fellow up-and-comer Robin van Roosmalen. At 21, Dahlbeck was the youngest contestant in the highly regarded tournament. He was to fight Andy Ristie at Glory 10: Los Angeles - Middleweight World Championship Tournament in Ontario, California on September 28, 2013. However, he withdrew for undisclosed reasons and was replaced by Niclas Larsen. In March 2014, Dahlbeck announced the opening of Odenplan Fightgym and which he started together with André Bånghäll, Markus Österblom, Lars Ahlstedt and Hans Edström.

== Personal life ==
Dahlbeck is of Malaysian-Singaporean descent on his mother's side. In 2011, he discovered that he had a long-lost half sister from his mother's previous marriage living in the United States.

In 2015, Dahlbeck had a relationship with Swedish actress Noomi Rapace. They made their first public appearance as a couple at the BAFTAs on 8 February 2015. On 2 October 2015, it was reported that the couple had broken up.

== Titles ==
- Swedish Muay Thai Federation
  - 2017 SMTF Swedish Muaythai Championships (gold) -71 kg
  - 2011 SMTF Swedish Muaythai Championships (gold) -67 kg
  - 2010 SMTF Swedish Muaythai Championships (silver) -67 kg
  - 2009 SMTF Swedish Muaythai Championships (gold) -67 kg
- Yokkao
  - 2015 Yokkao World title -70 kg
- World Muaythai Council
  - 2012 WMC Nordic Muaythai Welterweight Champion
- International Federation of Muaythai Associations
  - 2011 IFMA Nordic Muaythai Championships (gold) -67 kg
  - 2010 IFMA Nordic Muaythai Championships (gold) -67 kg
  - 2009 IFMA Muaythai World Championships B-class in Bangkok, Thailand (gold) -67 kg

== Fight record ==
Professional kickboxing record
| Date | Result | Opponent | Event | Location | Method | Round | Time |
|---|---|---|---|---|---|---|---|
| 2022-06-11 | Loss | (United Kingdom) Luke Bar | West Coast Battle 13 | Sweden | TKO (corner stoppage/elbow) | 5 | |
| 2021-11-14 | Loss | (Finland) Niko Korventaus | Bulldog Fight Night 9 | Gothenburg, Sweden | TKO (elbow) | 3 | 0:30 |
| 2021-04-10 | Win | (Sweden) Robbie Daniels | Empire Fighting Series | Stockholm, Sweden | TKO | 4 | |
| 2019-12-11 | Win | (Sweden) Jonatan Larsson | AK Fighting Championships 3 | Gothenburg, Sweden | KO (overhand left) | 3 | |
| 2017-11-25 | Win | (Spain) Youssef El Hadmi | Rumble Of The Kings | Sweden | Decision | 3 | 3:00 |
| 2017-06-18 | Loss | (Japan) Yasuhiro Kido | K-1 World GP 2017 Super Middleweight Championship Tournament, Semi Finals | Tokyo, Japan | KO (low kicks) | 1 | 2:28 |
| 2017-06-18 | Win | (Japan) Yu Hirono | K-1 World GP 2017 Super Middleweight Championship Tournament, Quarter Finals | Tokyo, Japan | TKO | 2 | |
| 2016-11-25 | Loss | (Sweden) Abdou Karim Chorr | Rumble Of the Kings | Stockholm, Sweden | KO (elbow) | 1 | |
| 2016-11-03 | Win | (Japan) Yasuhiro Kido | K-1 World GP 2016 Featherweight Championship Tournament | Tokyo, Japan | KO (left overhand + left knee) | 1 | 2:09 |
| 2016-03-19 | Loss | (England) Jordan Watson | Yokkao 18 | England | Decision | 5 | 3:00 |
Loss Yokkao 70kg title .
| 2015-12-28 | Loss | (Thailand) Aikpracha Meenayothin | Topking World Series 8 | Pattaya, Thailand | TKO (punches and elbow) | 2 | |
| 2015-07-04 | Loss | (Netherlands) Jordann Pikeur | K-1 World GP 2015 -70kg Championship Tournament, Semi Finals | Tokyo, Japan | TKO | 2 | 1:03 |
| 2015-07-04 | Win | (Japan) Hiroki Nakajima | K-1 World GP 2015 -70kg Championship Tournament, Quarter Finals | Tokyo, Japan | TKO | 2 | 3:00 |
| 2015-03-21 | Win | (England) Jordan Watson | Yokkao 12 | England | TKO | 4 | 3:00 |
Won Yokkao 70kg title .
| 2015-01-18 | Win | (Japan) Yoshihiro Sato | K-1 World GP 2015 -60kg Championship Tournament | Tokyo, Japan | KO | 4 | 2:08 |
| 2014-23-06 | Win | (Thailand) Tanongdet Siangsimaewgym | King Fight | Falun, Sweden | TKO | 2 | 3:00 |
| 2014-09-20 | Win | (Georgia (country)) Guram Kutateladze | Battle of Lund 6 | Lund, Sweden | Decision (3-0) | 5 | 3:00 |
| 2014-06-14 | Loss | (Thailand) Deo Phetsangkhat | Fight Night Finland | Helsinki, Finland | Decision (0-3) | 5 | 3:00 |
| 2013-08-17 | Loss | (Germany) Sebastian Mendez | Fight Night 08 | Stockholm, Sweden | Decision (1-2) | 3 | 3:00 |
| 2013-03-23 | Win | (Italy) Mauro Serra | Heroes Fighting Championship | Halmstad, Sweden | Decision (3-0) | 3 | 3:00 |
| 2012-10-02 | Loss | (Netherlands) Robin van Roosmalen | Glory 3: Rome - 70 kg Slam Tournament, Semi Finals | Rome, Italy | TKO (body shot) | 3 | |
| 2012-10-02 | Win | (Japan) Yoshihiro Sato | Glory 3: Rome - 70 kg Slam Tournament, Quarter Finals | Rome, Italy | TKO (knee) | 2 | |
| 2012-05-26 | Win | (South Africa) Warren Stevelmans | Glory 1: Stockholm - 70 kg Slam Tournament, First Round | Stockholm, Sweden | Decision | 3 | 3:00 |
| 2011-11-26 | Win | (Sweden) Martin Akhtar | Rumble of the Kings | Stockholm, Sweden | Decision (3-0) | 3 | 3:00 |
Wins WMC Nordic Welterweight Championship.
| 2011-11-26 | Win | (Finland) Pasi Luukanen | Rumble of the Kings | Stockholm, Sweden | KO (elbow) | 3 | 0:49 |
| 2010-08-01 | Win | (Sweden) Jonas Berglund | Wat Santinivas | | Decision (3-0) | 5 | 3:00 |
| 2010-05-01 | Win | (Sweden) David Teymur | | Helsinki, Finland | Decision (3-0) | 5 | 3:00 |
| 2009-03-27 | Win | (Sweden) Genk Uka | Battle of Sweden 2 | Stockholm, Sweden | TKO | | |
| 2009-00-00 | Win | (Norway) Tang Quach | C-4 Time 4 Champions | Stockholm, Sweden | KO | | 3:00 |
Legend: Win Loss Draw/no contest Notes

Amateur kickboxing record
| Date | Result | Opponent | Event | Location | Method | Round | Time |
|---|---|---|---|---|---|---|---|
| 2018-02-01 | Loss | (Sweden) Adel Ekvall | 2018 Swedish Championships - Semifinal | Sweden | TKO (injury) | | |
| 2011-09-01 | Loss | (Iran) Seyedisa Alamdarnezam | IFMA 2011 World Muaythai Championships, Quarter Finals | Bangkok, Thailand | Decision (3-0) | | |
| 2011-09-01 | Win | (Poland) Marcin Lepkowski | IFMA 2011 World Muaythai Championships | Bangkok, Thailand | Decision (3-0) | | |
| 2011-05-11 | Loss | (Ukraine) Sergey Kulyaba | IFMA 2011 European Muaythai Championships | Antalaya, Turkey | Decision (1-2) | | |
| 2011-02-01 | Win | (Sweden) Fredrik Björnander | Swedish Championships Muaythai | Stockholm, Sweden | KO | | |
Wins SMTF 2011 Swedish Muaythai Championships 67kg gold medal.
| 2011-01-01 | Win | (Sweden) Elvis Androvic | Swedish Championships Muaythai | Stockholm, Sweden | KO | | |
| 2011-01-01 | Win | (Sweden) Daniel Anderson | Swedish Championships Muaythai | Stockholm, Sweden | KO | | |
| 2010-12-00 | Loss | Mustafa Hamza | IFMA 2010 World Muaythai Championships | Bangkok, Thailand | | | |
| 2010-12-00 | Win | Mohammed Aziz | IFMA 2010 World Muaythai Championships | Bangkok, Thailand | KO | | |
| 2010-09-18 | Win | (Denmark) Chanty Soi | IFMA 2010 Nordic Muaythai Championships | Copenhagen, Denmark | KO | | |
Wins IFMA 2010 Nordic Championships -67kg gold .
| 2010-09-18 | Win | (Finland) Antero Hynynen | IFMA 2010 Nordic Muaythai Championships | Copenhagen, Denmark | Decision (3-0) | 3 | |
| 2010-02-01 | Loss | (Sweden) David Teymur | Swedish Championships Muaythai | Stockholm, Sweden | Decision (1-2) | 3 | 3:00 |
Wins SMTF 2011 Swedish Muaythai Championships 67kg silver medal.
| 2010-02-01 | Win | (Sweden) Kim Carneus | Swedish Championships Muaythai | Stockholm, Sweden | KO | | |
| 2010-02-01 | Win | (Sweden) Fredrik Svensson | Swedish Championships Muaythai | Stockholm, Sweden | Decision (3-0) | 3 | 3:00 |
| 2009-12-00 | Win | (Slovenia) Peter Simko | IFMA 2009 World Muaythai Championships | Bangkok, Thailand | Decision (3-0) | | |
Wins IFMA 2009 World Muay Thai Championships B-class 67kg gold medal.
| 2009-12-00 | Win | (Turkey) Harim Hariyoli | IFMA 2009 World Muaythai Championships | Bangkok, Thailand | KO | | |
| 2009-12-00 | Win | (Canada) Ruel Copeland | IFMA 2009 World Muaythai Championships | Bangkok, Thailand | Decision (3-0) | | |
| 2009-03-27 | Win | (Sweden) David Teymur | Battle of Sweden | Stockholm, Sweden | Decision (2-1) | 3 | 3:00 |
Wins SMTF Swedish Welterweight Championship.
| 2008-08-00 | Win | (Finland) Miko Kopponen | | | KO | | |
Legend: Win Loss Draw/no contest Notes
