= Hiroki Nakajima =

Japanese welterweight kickboxer

- Born: July 5, 1988 (age 38); Tokyo, Japan
- Native name: 中島弘貴
- Height: 1.76 m (5 ft 9 1/2 in)
- Weight: 70 kg (150 lb; 11 st)
- Division: Welterweight
- Style: Kickboxing
- Fighting out of: Tokyo, Japan
- Team: Bungeling Bay
- Years active: 2006-present

Kickboxing record
- Total: 50
- Wins: 32
- By knockout: 19
- Losses: 18

Hiroki Nakajima (中島 弘貴, born July 5, 1988) in Tokyo, Japan is a Japanese welterweight kickboxer fighting out of Tokyo, Japan for the Bungeling Bay gym. He is the 2009 Krush middleweight tournament champion and 2010 K-1 World MAX Japan runner up.

== Biography / Career ==
Nakajima began his kickboxing career in 2006 with the Shoot Boxing organization, winning all four of his fights. In 2009 after fighting for a number of promotions he joined Krush and won their "Road to MAX" 70 kg tournament at the end of the year. As Krush was a feeder league for K-1 MAX, champion Nakajima qualified for the following year's K-1 World MAX Japan tournament.

He went into the competition on a hot winning streak, having won all eleven of his fights, an impressive seven by KO. At the tournament in Saitama Nakajima made his way to the final, stopping both of his opponents including a 0:58 second knockout of fellow prospect Hinata Watanabe. In the final he faced Yuichiro Nagashima in what was an entertaining match with both fighters going all out in their quest for victory. In the second round Nakajima managed to knock down Nagashima but was unable to press home his advantage, losing in the third by knockout. Despite the first ever loss on his record, Nakajima's performance at the tournament earned him a call up to the K-1 World MAX 2010 Final 16 - Part 1 where he lost his elimination fight to 2002 MAX champion Albert Kraus.

He scored a first-round knockout over KEN at Krush Ignition vol. 4 in Tokyo, Japan on June 2, 2013.

He lost to Yoichi Yamazaki via extension round split decision on August 11, 2013, at Krush.30.

== Titles ==
- Krush
  - 2009 Krush "Road to MAX" -70 kg Tournament Winner
  - 2015 Krush -70 kg Champion
- K-1
  - 2010 K-1 World MAX 2010 -70kg Japan Tournament runner up
- It's Showtime
  - 2012 It's Showtime Japan -70 kg Champion

== Fight record ==
Kickboxing Record
32 Wins (19 (T)KO's), 20 Losses
Date	Result	Opponent	Event	Location	Method	Round	Time
2025-11-15	Loss	(Japan) Yukimitsu Takahashi	KNOCK OUT.59	Tokyo, Japan	Decision (Majority)	3	3:00
2025-05-18	Loss	(Japan) Ryoki	KNOCK OUT 2024 vol.6	Tokyo, Japan	Decision (Unanimous)	3	3:00
For the interim KNOCK OUT Black Super Welterweight Championship.
2024-12-01	Win	(Japan) Jaki Masaya	KNOCK OUT 2024 vol.6	Tokyo, Japan	Decision (Unanimous)	3	3:00
2024-02-25	Loss	(Japan) Jinku Oda	KNOCK OUT 2024 vol.1	Tokyo, Japan	Ext.R Decision (Unanimous)	4	3:00
2023-04-22	Win	(Japan) Kohei Nishikawa	KNOCK OUT 2023 vol.1	Tokyo, Japan	TKO (3 Knockdowns)	2	2:09
2022-10-16	Loss	(Thailand) Kuntap Charoenchai	KNOCK OUT 2022 vol.6	Tokyo, Japan	Decision (Majority)	3	3:00
2022-07-23	Win	(Japan) Ryoki	KNOCK OUT 2022 vol.4	Tokyo, Japan	TKO (Referee stoppage)	4	1:22
2022-04-17	Win	(Cambodia) Khonreach	KNOCK OUT 2022 vol.3	Tokyo, Japan	KO (Right cross)	2	0:25
2022-01-22	Win	(Japan) Shuhei Sone	KNOCK OUT 2022 vol.1	Tokyo, Japan	KO (3 Knockdowns)	1	1:21
2021-10-29	Win	(Japan) Yojiro Hiratsuka	KNOCK OUT 2021 vol.5	Tokyo, Japan	Decision (Unanimous)	3	:300
2021-07-18	Win	(Cambodia) Saksith	KNOCK OUT 2021 vol.3	Tokyo, Japan	TKO (Punches)	1	
2019-11-02	Loss	(China) Song Shaoqiu	Wu Lin Feng 2019: WLF -67kg World Cup 2019-2020 6th Group Stage	Zhengzhou, China	Decision (Unanimous)	3	3:00
2019-06-23	Loss	(Japan) Kaito	Shoot Boxing 2019 act.3	Tokyo, Japan	TKO (Jumping knee)	4	2:55
2018-01-27	Loss	(Japan) Katsuya Jinbo	Krush 84	Tokyo, Japan	Decision (Unanimous)	3	3:00
2017-06-18	Loss	(Belarus) Chingiz Allazov	K-1 World GP 2017 Super Middleweight Championship Tournament, Quarter Finals	Tokyo, Japan	KO (Left Uppercut)	2	1:18
2017-03-03	Win	(Japan) Yoichi Yamazaki	Krush 74	Japan	KO (Jumping knee)	2	2:00
2017-01-15	Win	(Japan) Hiromi Wajima	Krush 72	Japan	Decision (Majority)	3	3:00
2016-09-21	Win	(Japan) Kotetsu	Krush 69	Japan	Decision (unanimous)	3	3:00
2016-04-10	Loss	(Netherlands) Jordann Pikeur	Krush 65	Tokyo, Japan	Decision (unanimous)	3	3:00
Loses the Krush -70 kg title.
2015-11-21	Win	(Russia) Dmitrii Grafov	K-1 World GP 2015 The Championship	Tokyo, Japan	Decision (unanimous)	3	3:00
2015-10-04	Win	(Japan) Yutaro Yamauchi	Krush.59	Tokyo, Japan	Decision (Unanimous)	3	3:00
Defends the Krush -70 kg title.
2015-07-04	Loss	(Sweden) Sanny Dahlbeck	K-1 World GP 2015 -70kg Championship Tournament, Quarter Finals	Tokyo, Japan	TKO (2 knockdowns/Punches)	2	2:01
2015-04-12	Win	(Japan) Yoichi Yamazaki	Krush.53	Tokyo, Japan	Decision (Unanimous)	3	3:00
Wins the Krush -70 kg title.
2015-02-06	Win	(Japan) Shintaro Matsukura	Krush 51	Tokyo, Japan	Decision (Unanimous)	3	3:00
2014-10-25	Loss	(Cambodia) Sen Bunthen	THAI FIGHT KING OF MUAY THAI 2014	Bangkok, Thailand	Decision	3	3:00
2014-04-15	Loss	(Japan) Yasuhiro Kido	Krush.40	Tokyo, Japan	Decision (Unanimous)	3	3:00
For the Krush -70 kg title.
2014-01-04	Win	(Korea) Un Pyo Ha	Krush 37	Tokyo, Japan	TKO (Flying knee)	3	1:44
2013-10-30	Win	(Japan) Taisei Kondo	Krush-IGNITION 2013 vol.7	Tokyo, Japan	TKO (Knee to the body)	3	1:01
2013-06-02	Loss	(Japan) Yoichi Yamazaki	Krush.30	Tokyo, Japan	Ext.R Decision (split)	4	3:00
2013-06-02	Win	(Japan) KEN	Krush Ignition vol. 4	Tokyo, Japan	KO	1	
2013-03-20	Loss	(Japan) Yutaro Yamauchi	Krush.27	Tokyo, Japan	KO (Right hook)	2	1:10
2012-07-29	Loss	(Netherlands) Henri van Opstal	REBELS.12 & It's Showtime Japan Countdown-2	Tokyo, Japan	Decision (majority)	3	3:00
2012-01-22	Win	(Brazil) Danilo Zanolini	REBELS.10	Tokyo, Japan	Decision (Unanimous)	5	3:00
Wins It's Showtime Japan -70 kg title.
2011-09-25	Loss	(Japan) Takafumi Morita	K-1 World MAX 2011 -70kg Japan Tournament Final, Quarter Final	Osaka, Japan	Decision (Unanimous)	3	3:00
2011-07-16	Loss	(Japan) Kenta	Krush inaugural -70 kg Championship Tournament, Semi Final	Tokyo, Japan	Decision (Unanimous)	3	3:00
2011-05-29	Win	(Japan) YOSHI	Krush 70 kg Tournament Opener, Quarter Finals	Tokyo, Japan	KO (Jumping knee)	3	0:50
Qualifies for Krush tournament semi finals -70 kg.
2010-12-30	Loss	(Thailand) Buakaw Por. Pramuk	World Victory Road Presents: Soul of Fight	Tokyo, Japan	Decision (Unanimous)	3	3:00
2010-07-05	Loss	(Netherlands) Albert Kraus	K-1 World MAX 2010 Final 16 - Part 1	Tokyo, Japan	Decision (Unanimous)	3	3:00
Fails to qualify for K-1 World MAX 2010 Final.
2010-03-27	Loss	(Japan) Yuichiro Nagashima	K-1 World MAX 2010 Japan, Final	Saitama, Japan	KO (Right Hook)	3	1:58
Fight was for K-1 World MAX 2010 Japan title -70 kg. Despite defeat he qualifies for K-1 World MAX Final 16 - Part 1.
2010-03-27	Win	(Japan) Hinata	K-1 World MAX 2010 Japan, Semi Finals	Saitama, Japan	KO (Right Hook)	1	0:58
2010-03-27	Win	(Japan) Tatsuji	K-1 World MAX 2010 Japan, Quarter Finals	Saitama, Japan	KO (Punch Rush)	2	0:43
2009-11-02	Win	(Japan) Yutaro Yamauchi	Krush Lightweight GP 2009 Final Round, "Road to MAX" Final	Tokyo, Japan	2nd Ext.R Decision (Unanimous)	5	3:00
Wins Krush "Road to MAX" -70 kg tournament and qualifies for K-1 World MAX 2010 Japan.
2009-09-22	Win	(Japan) Hiroshi Sannai	Krush 4, "Road to MAX" Semi Finals	Tokyo, Japan	Decision (Unanimous)	3	3:00
Qualifies for Krush "Road to MAX" -70 kg tournament final.
2009-08-14	Win	(Japan) Daisuke Tsutsumi	Krush Lightweight GP 2009 Final 16, Super Fight	Tokyo, Japan	Ext.R Decision (Unanimous)	4	3:00
2009-05-17	Win	(Japan) Tomo Kiire	A.J.K.F. "Krush 3"	Japan	TKO (Corner Stoppage)	3	2:33
2009-03-14	Win	(Japan) Kazunori "POPEYE" Kagebi	A.J.K.F. "Krush 2"	Japan	KO	2	0:41
2008-11-30	Win	(Japan) 73King	R.I.S.E. 51	Tokyo, Japan	Decision (Unanimous)	3	3:00
2008-10-31	Win	(Japan) KOUHEI	The Smoker's Halloween	Tokyo, Japan	KO	1	1:07
2007-10-28	Win	(Japan) Takuo Tsukamoto	Shoot Boxing Battle Summit Ground Zero	Tokyo, Japan	TKO (Corner Stoppage)	2	0:30
2007-09-30	Win	(Japan) Kenji Matsumoto	Shoot Boxing Warriors 2007 MU-SO 4	Tokyo, Japan	Ext.R KO (Left Hook)	2	2:49
2007-07-29	Win	(Japan) Takashi Hishida	Shoot Boxing Warriors 2007 MU-SO 3	Tokyo, Japan	TKO (3 Knockdowns/Right Hook)	1	1:18
2006-09-23	Win	(Japan) Keisuke Nobata	WSBA "Shoot Boxing 2006 Neo ΟΡΘΡΟΣ Series 5th"	Tokyo, Japan	KO (Knee)	2	1:20
Legend: Win Loss Draw/No contest Notes

== See also ==
- List of male kickboxers
- List of K-1 Events
