= 2015 in K-1 =

Mixed martial arts events

Information
- First date: January 1
- Last date: November 21

Events
- Total events: 7

Fights

Chronology
2014 in K-1	2015 in K-1	2016 in K-1

The year 2015 is the 23rd year in the history of the K-1. 2015 starts with K-1 China vs. USA, and ends with K-1 World GP 2015 The Championship.

== List of events ==
#	Event Title	Date	Arena	Location
1	K-1 China vs. USA	January 1, 2015	Golden Eagle Culture City	Changsha, China
2	K-1 World GP 2015 -60kg Championship Tournament	January 18, 2015	Yoyogi National Gymnasium	Tokyo, Japan
3	K-1 China vs. Japan	February 1, 2015	Golden Eagle Culture City	Changsha, China
4	K-1 World GP 2015 -55kg Championship Tournament	April 19, 2015	Yoyogi National Gymnasium	Tokyo, Japan
5	K-1 World GP 2015 -70kg Championship Tournament	July 4, 2015	Yoyogi National Gymnasium	Tokyo, Japan
6	K-1 World GP 2015 Survival Wars	September 22, 2015	Korakuen Hall	Tokyo, Japan
7	K-1 World GP 2015 The Championship	November 21, 2015	Yoyogi National Gymnasium	Tokyo, Japan

== K-1 China vs. USA ==
K-1 China vs. USA
- Promotion: K-1
- Date: January 1, 2015
- Venue: Golden Eagle Culture City
- City: Changsha, China

Event chronology
K-1 World GP 2014 -65kg Championship Tournament	K-1 China vs. USA	K-1 World GP 2015 -60kg Championship Tournament

K-1 China vs. USA was a kickboxing event held on January 1, 2015 at the Golden Eagle Culture City in Changsha, China.

=== Results ===
Main Card
Weight Class				Method	Round	Time	Notes
90kg	(United States) Andrew Tate	def.	(China) Liang Ling	Decision	3	3:00
60kg	(United States) Joseph Logan	def.	(China) Lei Peng Hui	TKO	1
53kg	(China) E Meidie	def.	(Serbia) Sanja Sucevic	Decision	3	3:00
64kg	(China) Wang Zhi Wei	def.	(United States) Arthur Sorsor	KO	1
68kg	(United States) Justin Greskiewicz	def.	(China) Li Yun Kun	Decision	3	3:00
70kg	(China) Tian Xian	def.	(United States) Tony Hervey	TKO	2
70kg	(China) Zhou Zhi Peng	def.	(United States) Stavone Warren	Decision	3	3:00
70kg	(South Korea) Dong-Soo Kim	def.	(China) Wang Jing Wei	TKO	2

== K-1 World GP 2015 -60kg Championship Tournament ==
K-1 World GP 2015 -60kg Championship Tournament
- Promotion: K-1
- Date: January 18, 2015
- Venue: Yoyogi National Gymnasium
- City: Tokyo, Japan

Event chronology
K-1 China vs. USA	K-1 World GP 2015 -60kg Championship Tournament	K-1 China vs. Japan

K-1 World GP 2015 –60kg Championship Tournament was a kickboxing event held on January 18, 2015 at the Yoyogi National Gymnasium in Tokyo, Japan. This event featured 8-Man tournament for the inaugural K-1 -60kg Championship, and other super fights.

=== Results ===
Main Card
Weight Class				Method	Round	Time	Notes
60kg	(Japan) Koya Urabe	def.	(Japan) Hirotaka Urabe	Decision (unanimous)	3	3:00	-60kg Tournament Final; For the -60kg Championship
65kg	(Brazil) Minoru Kimura	def.	(Thailand) Kaew Fairtex	Decision (majority)	3	3:00
70kg	(Sweden) Sanny Dahlbeck	def.	(Japan) Yoshihiro Sato	KO	4	2:08
60kg	(Japan) Koya Urabe	def.	(Japan) Masahiro Yamamoto	KO	1	2:44	-60kg Tournament Semi Final
60kg	(Japan) Hirotaka Urabe	def.	(Spain) Javier Hernandez	Extra round decision (unanimous)	4	3:00	-60kg Tournament Semi Final
55kg	(Japan) Takiya Shota	def.	(China) Shou Rong	Decision (unanimous)	3	3:00
55kg	(Japan) Tobe Ryuma	def.	(Japan) Horio Ryuji	Decision (unanimous)	3	3:00
60kg	(Japan) Koya Urabe	def.	(Canada) Denis Puric	KO	1	2:05	-60kg Tournament Quarter Final
60kg	(Japan) Masahiro Yamamoto	def.	(France) Gagny Baradji	Decision (majority)	3	3:00	-60kg Tournament Quarter Final
60kg	(Japan) Hirotaka Urabe	def.	(Algeria) Karim Bennoui	KO	1	2:03	-60kg Tournament Quarter Final
60kg	(Spain) Javier Hernandez	def.	(Japan) Koutarou Shimano	Decision (unanimous)	3	3:00	-60kg Tournament Quarter Final
60kg	(Japan) Toshi	def.	(South Korea) Hun Jae Kim	Decision (unanimous)	3	3:00	-60kg Tournament Reserve Fight
Preliminary Card
Weight Class				Method	Round	Time	Notes
65kg	(Japan) Ren Hiramoto	def.	(Japan) Yuki Ishikawa	KO	1	1:25
Heavyweight	(Japan) Tomoya Fujita	def.	(Japan) Manabu	Decision (unanimous)	3	3:00
60kg	(Japan) Shota Kanbe	def.	(Japan) Yuma	Decision (unanimous)	3	3:00
65kg	(Japan) Masanobu Goto	def.	(Japan) Yuta Saito	KO	1	1:30

=== K-1 World GP 2015 -60kg Championship Tournament bracket ===
Quarter-finals
(Japan) Koutarou Shimano	3-0
(Spain) Javier Hernandez	DEC
(Japan) Hirotaka Urabe	KO
(Algeria) Karim Bennoui	1R.
(Japan) Masahiro Yamamoto	DEC
(France) Gagny Baradji	2-0
(Japan) Koya Urabe	KO
(Canada) Denis Puric	1R.

Semi-finals
(Spain) Javier Hernandez	3-0^{1}
(Japan) Hirotaka Urabe	DEC
(Japan) Masahiro Yamamoto	1R.
(Japan) Koya Urabe	KO

Final
(Japan) Hirotaka Urabe	3-0
(Japan) Koya Urabe	DEC

^{1} Extra round

== K-1 China vs. Japan ==
K-1 China vs. Japan
- Promotion: K-1
- Date: February 1, 2015
- Venue: Golden Eagle Culture City
- City: Changsha, China

Event chronology
K-1 World GP 2015 -60kg Championship Tournament	K-1 China vs. Japan	K-1 World GP 2015 -55kg Championship Tournament

K-1 China vs. Japan was a kickboxing event held on February 1, 2015 at the Golden Eagle Culture City in Changsha, China.

=== Results ===
Main Card
Weight Class				Method	Round	Time	Notes
65kg	(Japan) Kuji Yoshimoto	def.	(China) Hanji	Decision	3	3:00
70kg	(Japan) K-Jee	def.	(China) Zang Lei	TKO	3
53kg	(China) E Meidie	def.	(Japan) Syuri	Decision	3	3:00
63kg	(Japan) Keisuke Nakamura	def.	(China) Wang Zhiwei	TKO	Ex)1
60kg	(Japan) Tomohiro Kiyai	def.	(China) Wu Ze	Decision	3	3:00
70kg	(China) Tien Xin	def.	(Japan) Hideaki Kikkawa	TKO	2
70kg	(Japan) Jungle Koki	def.	(China) Ba Te Er	Decision	3	3:00

== K-1 World GP 2015 -55kg Championship Tournament ==
K-1 World GP 2015 -55kg Championship Tournament
- Promotion: K-1
- Date: April 19, 2015
- Venue: Yoyogi National Gymnasium
- City: Tokyo, Japan

Event chronology
K-1 China vs. Japan	K-1 World GP 2015 -55kg Championship Tournament	K-1 World GP 2015 -70kg Championship Tournament

K-1 World GP 2015 -55kg Championship Tournament was a kickboxing event held on April 19, 2015 at the Yoyogi National Gymnasium in Tokyo, Japan. This event featured 8-Man tournament for the inaugural K-1 -55kg Championship, and other super fights.

=== Results ===
Main Card
Weight Class				Method	Round	Time	Notes
55kg	(Japan) Takeru Segawa	def.	(Japan) Taiga	Decision (unanimous)	3	3:00	-55kg Tournament Final; For the -55kg Championship
60kg	(Japan) Koya Urabe	def.	(Spain) Javier Hernandez	Decision (unanimous)	3	3:00
65kg	(Brazil) Minoru Kimura	def.	(Japan) Hiroya	KO	1	2:45
55kg	(Japan) Taiga	def.	(Japan) Nobuchika Terado	KO	3	2:40	-55kg Tournament Semi Final
55kg	(Japan) Takeru Segawa	def.	(Japan) Shota Takiya	KO	1	1:31	-55kg Tournament Semi Final
65kg	(Japan) Yasuomi Soda	def.	(Japan) Yuta Kubo	Decision (unanimous)	3	3:00
65kg	(Netherlands) Massaro Glunder	def.	(Japan) Masaaki Noiri	TKO	2	0:40
55kg	(Japan) Taiga	def.	(Morocco) Soufiane El Haji	Decision (unanimous)	3	3:00	-55kg Tournament Quarter Final
55kg	(Japan) Nobuchika Terado	def.	(Portugal) Rui Botelho	Extra round decision (split)	4	3:00	-55kg Tournament Quarter Final
55kg	(Japan) Shota Takiya	def.	(Australia) Danial Williams	Decision (majority)	3	3:00	-55kg Tournament Quarter Final
55kg	(Japan) Takeru Segawa	def.	(Russia) Alexandre Prilip	KO	2	1:48	-55kg Tournament Quarter Final
55kg	(Japan) Keisuke Ishida	def.	(Japan) Taisuke Degai	Decision (unanimous)	3	3:00	-55kg Tournament Reserve Fight
Preliminary Card
Weight Class				Method	Round	Time	Notes
55kg	(Japan) Ren Hiramoto	def.	(Japan) Yuki Izuka	KO	1	1:40
70kg	(Japan) Kotetsu	def.	(Japan) K-Jee	KO	1	2:15
55kg	(Japan) Yuichiro Ito	def.	(Japan) Kazuyoshi	Decision (unanimous)	3	3:00
55kg	(Japan) Haruma Saikyo	def.	(Japan) Yoshiki Takei	Decision (majority)	3	3:00

=== K-1 World GP 2015 -55kg Championship Tournament bracket ===
Quarter-finals
(Japan) Takeru Segawa	KO
(Russia) Alexandre Prilip	2R.
(Japan) Shota Takiya	DEC
(Australia) Danial Williams	2-0
(Japan) Nobuchika Terado	DEC
(Portugal) Rui Botelho	2-1^{1}
(Japan) Taiga	DEC
(Morocco) Soufiane El Haji	3-0

Semi-finals
(Japan) Takeru Segawa	KO
(Japan) Shota Takiya	1R.
(Japan) Nobuchika Terado	3R.
(Japan) Taiga	KO

Final
(Japan) Takeru Segawa	DEC
(Japan) Taiga	3-0

^{1} Extra round

== K-1 World GP 2015 -70kg Championship Tournament ==
K-1 World GP 2015 -70kg Championship Tournament
- Promotion: K-1
- Date: July 4, 2015
- Venue: Yoyogi National Gymnasium
- City: Tokyo, Japan

Event chronology
K-1 World GP 2015 -55kg Championship Tournament	K-1 World GP 2015 -70kg Championship Tournament	K-1 World GP 2015 Survival Wars

K-1 World GP 2015 -70kg Championship Tournament was a kickboxing event held on July 4, 2015 at the Yoyogi National Gymnasium in Tokyo, Japan. This event featured 8-Man tournament for the inaugural K-1 -70kg Championship, and other super fights.

=== Results ===
Main Card
Weight Class				Method	Round	Time	Notes
70kg	(Armenia) Marat Grigorian	def.	(Netherlands) Jordann Pikeur	KO (punches)	1	1:24	-70kg Tournament Final; For the -70kg Championship
65kg	(Thailand) Kaew Fairtex	def.	(Japan) Yasuomi Soda	Decision (unanimous)	3	3:00
60kg	(Japan) Koya Urabe	def.	(Ukraine) Konstantin Trishin	Decision (unanimous)	3	3:00
55kg	(Japan) Takeru Segawa	def.	(Algeria) Hakim Hamech	Decision (unanimous)	3	3:00
70kg	(Netherlands) Jordann Pikeur	def.	(Sweden) Sanny Dahlbeck	TKO (2 knockdowns)	2	1:03	-70kg Tournament Semi Final
70kg	(Armenia) Marat Grigorian	def.	(Japan) Makihira Keita	KO (left body hook)	2	2:00	-70kg Tournament Semi Final
65kg	(Brazil) Minoru Kimura	def.	(Netherlands) Massaro Glunder	Decision (unanimous)	4	3:00
60kg	(Japan) Hirotaka Urabe	def.	(Japan) Toshi	Decision (unanimous)	4	3:00
70kg	(Netherlands) Jordann Pikeur	def.	(Japan) Daiki Watabe	TKO (2 knockdowns)	2	2:55	-70kg Tournament Quarter Final
70kg	(Sweden) Sanny Dahlbeck	def.	(Japan) Hiroki Nakajima	TKO (2 knockdowns)	2	2:01	-70kg Tournament Quarter Final
70kg	(Japan) Makihira Keita	def.	(France) Dylan Salvador	Decision (unanimous)	3	3:00	-70kg Tournament Quarter Final
70kg	(Armenia) Marat Grigorian	def.	(Japan) Yoichi Yamazaki	KO (left high kick)	2	0:51	-70kg Tournament Quarter Final
70kg	(Ukraine) Serhiy Adamchuk	def.	(Japan) Kazuya Akimoto	Decision (split)	3	3:00	-70kg Tournament Reserve Fight
Preliminary Card
Weight Class				Method	Round	Time	Notes
65kg	(Japan) Ren Hiramoto	def.	(Japan) Yohei Noguchi	Decision (unanimous)	3	3:00
60kg	(Japan) Fumiya Osawa	draw	(Japan) Shingen Endo	Decision (majority)	3	3:00
Heavyweight	(Japan) Tsutomu Takahagi	draw	(Japan) Hitoshi Sugimoto	Decision (majority)	3	3:00
65kg	(Japan) Mitsuharu Waki	def.	(Japan) Kazuhiro	Decision (unanimous)	3	3:00

=== K-1 World GP 2015 -70kg Championship Tournament bracket ===
Quarter-finals
(Japan) Yoichi Yamazaki	2R.
(Armenia) Marat Grigorian	KO
(Japan) Makihira Keita	DEC
(France) Dylan Salvador	3-0
(Japan) Hiroki Nakajima	2R.
(Sweden) Sanny Dahlbeck	TKO
(Japan) Daiki Watabe	2R.
(Netherlands) Jordann Pikeur	TKO

Semi-finals
(Armenia) Marat Grigorian	KO
(Japan) Makihira Keita	2R.
(Sweden) Sanny Dahlbeck	2R.
(Netherlands) Jordann Pikeur	TKO

Final
(Armenia) Marat Grigorian	KO
(Netherlands) Jordann Pikeur	1R.

== K-1 World GP 2015 Survival Wars ==
K-1 World GP 2015 Survival Wars
- Promotion: K-1
- Date: September 22, 2015
- Venue: Korakuen Hall
- City: Tokyo, Japan

Event chronology
K-1 World GP 2015 -70kg Championship Tournament	K-1 World GP 2015; Survival Wars	K-1 World GP 2015 The Championship

K-1 World GP 2015 Survival Wars was a kickboxing event held on September 22, 2015 at the Korakuen Hall in Tokyo, Japan.

=== Results ===
Main Card
Weight Class				Method	Round	Time	Notes
65kg	(Brazil) Minoru Kimura	def.	(Japan) Ren Hiramoto	Decision (unanimous)	3	3:00
55kg	(France) Charles Bongiovanni	def.	(Australia) Danial Williams	KO	1	2:20	-55kg Title eliminator
70kg	(Japan) Shintaro Matsukura	def.	(China) Tian Xin	Decision (unanimous)	3	3:00
70kg	(Japan) Kazuya Akimoto	def.	(Japan) K-Jee	Decision (unanimous)	3	3:00
55kg	(Japan) Taisuke Degai	def.	(Japan) Yuichiro Ito	TKO	1	3:00
55kg	(Japan) Izawa Namito	def.	(Japan) Katashima Satoshi	Decision (unanimous)	4	3:00
65kg	(Japan) Takayuki Minamino	def.	(Japan) Mitsuharu Waki	Decision (unanimous)	3	3:00
Heavyweight	(Japan) Htoshi Sugimoto	def.	(Japan) Hidekazu Kimura	Decision (unanimous)	4	3:00
Preliminary Card
Weight Class				Method	Round	Time	Notes
70kg	(Japan) Katsuya Jinbo	draw	(Japan) Yasuhito	Decision (majority)	3	3:00
70kg	(Japan) Daisuke Fujimura	def.	(Japan) Go-Oh	KO	1	2:07
Heavyweight	(Japan) Yoshinari	def.	(Japan) Hase Flysky Gym	KO	1	1:03

== K-1 World GP 2015 The Championship ==
K-1 World GP 2015 The Championship
- Promotion: K-1
- Date: November 21, 2015
- Venue: Yoyogi National Gymnasium
- City: Tokyo, Japan

Event chronology
K-1 World GP 2015 Survival Wars	K-1 World GP 2015; The Championship	K-1 World GP 2016 -65kg Japan Tournament

K-1 World GP 2015 The Championship was a kickboxing event held on November 21, 2015 at the Yoyogi National Gymnasium in Tokyo, Japan. This event was originally scheduled to feature 4 title fights for the K-1 -70kg, -65kg, -60kg and -55kg Championship, but -70kg Championship bout was cancelled due to challenger Sanny Dahlbeck having a fever.

=== Results ===
Main Card
Weight Class				Method	Round	Time	Notes
65kg	(Thailand) Kaew Fairtex (c)	def.	(Brazil) Minoru Kimura	KO	1	2:55	For the -65kg Championship
60kg	(Japan) Hirotaka Urabe	def.	(Japan) Koya Urabe (c)	KO	3	2:14	For the -60kg Championship
55kg	(Japan) Takeru Segawa (c)	def.	(France) Charles Bongiovanni	KO	2	2:16	For the -55kg Championship
65kg	(Japan) Masaaki Noiri	def.	(Japan) Yasuomi Soda	Decision (unanimous)	3	3:00
70kg	(Japan) Hiroki Nakajima	def.	(Russia) Dmitrii Grafov	Decision (unanimous)	3	3:00
60kg	(Japan) Leona Pettas	def.	(Japan) Taiga	Decision (majority)	3	3:00
60kg	(Japan) Fumiya Osawa	def.	(Japan) Kotaro Shimano	Decision (unanimous)	3	3:00
65kg	(Netherlands) Massaro Glunder	def.	(Japan) Ren Hiramoto	Decision (majority)	3	3:00
65kg	(Japan) Yuto Shinohara	def.	(Japan) Kensei Kondo	KO	3	1:39	2015 K-1 Koshien 65kg Final
55kg	(Japan) Haruma Saikyo	def.	(Japan) Tatsuya Tsubakihara	Decision (split)	3	3:00	2015 K-1 Koshien 55kg Final
Preliminary Card
Weight Class				Method	Round	Time	Notes
60kg	(Japan) Taishi Hiratsuka	def.	(Japan) Yuki Miwa	KO	2	1:03
70kg	(Japan) Jin Hirayama	def.	(Japan) Daisuke Fujimura	KO	2	2:34
65kg	(Japan) Daiki Matsushita	def.	(Japan) Kazuhiro	KO	1	1:34

== See also ==
- List of K-1 events
- List of K-1 champions
- 2015 in Glory
- 2015 in Kunlun Fight
