= Ryuji Kajiwara =

Japanese kickboxer

- Born: 梶原 龍児; December 9, 1976 (age 49); Tokyo, Japan
- Nationality: Japanese
- Height: 174 cm (5 ft 8 1/2 in)
- Weight: 60 kg (132 lb; 9 st)
- Stance: Orthodox
- Fighting out of: Tokyo, Japan
- Team: Team Pegasus; Team Dragon
- Years active: 2004 - 2013

Professional boxing record
- Total: 22
- Wins: 14
- By knockout: 5
- Losses: 5
- By knockout: 2
- Draws: 3

Kickboxing record
- Total: 38
- Wins: 25
- By knockout: 6
- Losses: 13
- By knockout: 3

Other information
- Boxing record from BoxRec

Ryuji Kajiwara (born 9 December 1976) is a Japanese former professional kickboxer and boxer. He is the head trainer of K-1 Gym Headquarters Team Pegasus and member of the K-1 Japan Group executive committee. In 2012 he was ranked #7 lightweight in the world by Liverkick.

== Kickboxing career ==
=== J-NETWORK ===
==== Career beginnings ====
Kajiwara made his professional debut against Tetsu Fujii at R.I.S.E. VI on February 11, 2004. He lost the fight by split decision, with one judge scoring the fight 30–29 in his favor, while the remaining two judges scored the fight 30–29 and 29–28 for Fujii.

Kajiwara faced Sota Tamura at SHOOT BOXING 2004 Infinity-S Vol.3 on June 4, 2004. He won the fight by unanimous decision. Kajiwara next faced Yoshihiro Ono at the February 13, 2005 J-NETWORK event. He won the fight by a third-round technical knockout, the first stoppage victory of his career.

Kajiwara participated in the 2005 J-NETWORK Lightweight Rookie of the Year tournament. He won his quarterfinal bout against Fire Harada by unanimous decision on April 10, 2005, and advanced to the tournament semifinals, held on June 12, 2005, where he faced Hiroshi Iwakiri. Kajiwara beat Iwakiri by unanimous decision and faced Takenori Hosono in the tournament finals, which were held on the same day. He won the Rookie to the Year title with a first-round knockout of Hosono.

Kajiwara was booked to face Akihiro Kuroda at J-NETWORK GO! GO! J-NET '06 〜Light my fire!〜 on January 9, 2006. He won the fight by unanimous decision, after an extra round was contested.

==== Lightweight champion ====
Kajiwara was scheduled to fight the #1 ranked J-Network lightweight contender Yukihiro Komiya for the vacant lightweight title at J-NETWORK GO! GO! J-NET '06 〜Invading the DRAGON〜 on May 17, 2006. He won the fight by majority decision, with scores of 49–49, 50–48 and 50–48.

After capturing his first professional title, Kajiwara was booked in three non-title fights. He first next faced KAWASAKI at J-NETWORK MACH GO! GO! '06 on September 1, 2006. He won the fight by a third-round technical knockout. Kajiwara next faced Daisuke Watanabe at SURPRISING 8 MA Japan Kick on December 3, 2006. He once again won the fight by a third-round technical knockout. Kajiwara faced AJKF super featherweight champion Naoki Ishikawa in his third straight non-title bout at AJKF New Deal on April 15, 2007. The fight was ruled a majority draw.

Kajiwara was booked to face Makoto Nishiyama for the vacant WFCA World Lightweight title at J-NETWORK "TEAM DRAGON QUEST 1" on June 3, 2007. He won the closely contested bout by unanimous decision, with all three judges scoring the bout 50–49 in his favor.

=== AJKF ===
Kajiwara made his second AJKF appearance against Hisanori Maeda at AJKF Kick Return Kickboxer of the best 60 Tournament on August 25, 2007. He lost the fight by a fifth-round technical knockout. Kajiwara faced Fire Harada on October 25, 2007, in his last fight of the year. He rebounded from his third professional loss with a split decision win.

Kajiwara was booked to face the former two-time WBC featherweight champion Chi In-jin at K-1 ASIA MAX 2008 IN SEOUL on February 24, 2008. Chi won the fight by unanimous decision. Kajiwara suffered two consecutive losses for the first time in his career on May 31, 2008, as he lost a majority decision to Koji Yoshimoto at AJKF vs Team Dragon.

Kajiwara snapped his two-fight losing streak with a third-round technical knockout of Kim Young-kwang at J-NETWORK TEAM DRAGON QUEST 2 on August 31, 2008, after which he was booked to face Haruaki Otsuki at K-1 World MAX 2008 World Championship Tournament Final on October 1, 2008. Kajiwara lost his K-1 MAX debut by unanimous decision.

Kajiwara faced Akihiro Kuroda at KING OF KINGS TOUITSU in KOBE, -62 kg Tournament First Round on December 23, 2008. He lost the fight by majority decision. Kajiwara made his Krush debut against Genki Yamamoto at AJKF Krush 2 on March 14, 2009. He lost the fight by unanimous decision, with all three judges scoring the bout 30–28 for Yamamoto.

=== Krush ===
==== Early Krush career ====
Kajiwara participated in the 2009 Krush lightweight Grand Prix, the first round of which was held on July 24, 2009. Kajiwara beat Sol-de-tigre Yosuke in the opening round of the tournament by a second-round technical knockout and advanced to the tournament quarterfinals, where he faced Yuji Takeuchi. Takeuchi won the fight by unanimous decision, with scores of 30–28, 29–28 and 30–28.

Kajiwara made his third K-1 appearance against Keiichi Samukawa at K-1 World Grand Prix 2009 Final on December 5, 2009. He won the fight by unanimous decision, with scores of 30–28, 30–29 and 30–28.

Kajiwara was booked to face Daisuke Endo at Krush 6 on April 29, 2010. He won the fight by unanimous decision, with scores of 30–28, 30–28 and 29–28. Kajiwara next faced Naoki Ishikawa at Krush 9 on August 14, 2010. He won the fight by unanimous decision.

==== Krush lightweight champion ====
Kajiwara took part in the 2011 Krush First Generation King Tournament, held to crown the inaugural Krush champions. He earned his place in the final two bouts of the tournament with a unanimous decision victory against TaCa on January 9, 2011. Kajiwara faced Kizaemon Saiga in the penultimate bout of the tournament on April 30, 2011. He won the fight by unanimous decision. Kajiwara advanced to the finals, held on the same day, where he faced Koya Urabe. He beat Urabe by majority decision.

Kajiwara was booked to face Masaaki Noiri in the quarterfinals of the K-1 World MAX 2011 –63 kg Japan Tournament Final, held on June 25, 2011. Noiri won the fight by split decision, after an extra round was fought. After losing to Noiri in the first fight of the K-1 MAX, Kajiwara was scheduled to face Liu Wei in a non-title bout at Krush 12 on September 24, 2011. He won the fight by unanimous decision.

Kajiwara made his first Krush lightweight title defense against Tetsuya Yamato at Krush 14 on December 9, 2011. He won the fight by unanimous decision, with scores of 30–28, 30–28 and 30–27.

Kajiwara faced the 2008 K-1 Koshien tournament winner Hiroya in a non-title bout at Krush 18 on May 3, 2012. He won the fight by unanimous decision, with all three judges scoring the fight 30–28 in his favor.

Kajiwara made his second Krush lightweight title defense against the I.S.K.A. World Kickboxing champion Thomas Adamandopoulos at Krush 21 on August 12, 2012. He lost the fight by a second-round knockout.

==== Later Krush career ====
Kajiwara faced Ikki at Krush 25 on December 14, 2012. He won the fight by unanimous decision. After successfully rebounding for his title loss, Kajiwara suffered two consecutive losses. He first dropped a unanimous decision, after an extra round was fought, to Yukihiro Komiya at the Road to GLORY JAPAN -65 kg SLAM event on March 10, 2013. Kajiwara was then knocked out in the third round by Minoru Kimura at Krush 28 on May 12, 2013.

Kajiwara was booked to face Naoki Terasaki at Krush 33 on September 21, 2013. He won the fight by unanimous decision, snapping his two-fight losing streak. Kajiwara faced Hirotaka Urabe in his retirement fight at Krush 35 on December 14, 2013. He won the fight by unanimous decision and announced his retirement from the sport in the post-fight ring speech.

== Titles and accomplishments ==
- J-NETWORK
  - 2005 J-NETWORK Rookie Tournament Lightweight winner
  - 2006 J-NETWORK Lightweight Championship
- World Full Contact Association
  - 2007 WFCA World Lightweight Championship
- Krush
  - 2011 Krush Lightweight Championship
    - One successful title defense
  - 2011 "Fighter of the Year"

== Professional kickboxing record ==
Professional kickboxing record
25 wins (6 (T)KOs), 13 losses, 0 draws, 0 no contests
| Date | Result | Opponent | Event | Location | Method | Round | Time |
| 2013-12-14 | Win | (Japan) Hirotaka Urabe | Krush.35 | Tokyo, Japan | Decision (unanimous) | 3 | 3:00 |
| 2013-09-21 | Win | (Japan) Naoki Terasaki | Krush.33 | Tokyo, Japan | Decision (unanimous) | 3 | 3:00 |
| 2013-05-12 | Loss | (Brazil) Minoru Kimura | Krush 28 | Tokyo, Japan | TKO (ref stoppage/left hook) | 3 | 1:50 |
| 2013-03-10 | Loss | (Japan) Yukihiro Komiya | Road to GLORY JAPAN -65 kg SLAM, First Round | Tokyo, Japan | Ext.R decision (unanimous) | 4 | 3:00 |
| 2012-12-14 | Win | (Japan) Ikki | Krush.25 | Tokyo, Japan | Decision (unanimous) | 3 | 3:00 |
| 2012-08-12 | Loss | (France) Thomas Adamandopoulos | Krush.21 | Tokyo, Japan | KO (left high kick) | 2 | 1:42 |
Lost the Krush -63kg title.
| 2012-05-03 | Win | (Japan) Hiroya | Krush.18 | Tokyo, Japan | Decision (unanimous) | 3 | 3:00 |
| 2011-12-09 | Win | (Japan) Tetsuya Yamato | Krush.14 | Tokyo, Japan | Decision (unanimous) | 3 | 3:00 |
Defends the Krush -63kg title.
| 2011-09-24 | Win | (China) Liu Wei | Krush.12 | Tokyo, Japan | Decision (unanimous) | 3 | 3:00 |
| 2011-06-25 | Loss | (Japan) Masaaki Noiri | K-1 World MAX 2011 –63 kg Japan Tournament Final, Quarter Finals | Tokyo, Japan | Ext.R decision (split) | 4 | 3:00 |
| 2011-04-30 | Win | (Japan) Koya Urabe | Krush First Generation King Tournament Triple Final Round | Tokyo, Japan | Decision (majority) | 3 | 3:00 |
Wins inaugural Krush -63kg title
| 2011-04-30 | Win | (Japan) Kizaemon Saiga | Krush First Generation King Tournament Triple Final Round | Tokyo, Japan | Decision (unanimous) | 3 | 3:00 |
| 2011-01-09 | Win | (Japan) TaCa | Krush First Generation King Tournament First Round | Tokyo, Japan | Decision (unanimous) | 3 | 3:00 |
| 2010-08-14 | Win | (Japan) Naoki Ishikawa | Krush.9 | Tokyo, Japan | Decision (unanimous) | 3 | 3:00 |
| 2010-04-29 | Win | (Japan) Daisuke Endo | Krush.6 | Tokyo, Japan | Decision (unanimous) | 3 | 3:00 |
| 2009-12-05 | Win | (Japan) Keiichi Samukawa | K-1 World Grand Prix 2009 Final | Yokohama, Japan | Decision (unanimous) | 3 | 3:00 |
| 2009-07-24 | Loss | (Japan) Yuji Takeuchi | Krush Lightweight Grand Prix 2009, Quarter Final | Tokyo, Japan | Decision (unanimous) | 3 | 3:00 |
| 2009-07-24 | Win | (Japan) Sol-de-tigre Yosuke | Krush Lightweight Grand Prix 2009, First Round | Tokyo, Japan | TKO (doctor stoppage) | 2 | 1:00 |
| 2009-03-14 | Loss | (Japan) Genki Yamamoto | AJKF Krush 2 | Tokyo, Japan | Decision (unanimous) | 3 | 3:00 |
| 2008-12-23 | Loss | (Japan) Akihiro Kuroda | KING OF KINGS TOUITSU in KOBE, -62 kg Tournament First Round | Kobe, Japan | Decision (majority) | 3 | 3:00 |
| 2008-10-01 | Loss | (Japan) Haruaki Otsuki | K-1 World MAX 2008 World Championship Tournament Final | Tokyo, Japan | Decision (unanimous) | 3 | 3:00 |
| 2008-08-31 | Win | (Korea) Kim Young-kwang | J-NETWORK TEAM DRAGON QUEST 2 | Tokyo, Japan | TKO (3 knockdows) | 3 | 2:47 |
| 2008-05-31 | Loss | (Japan) Koji Yoshimoto | AJKF vs Team Dragon | Tokyo, Japan | Decision (majority) | 3 | 3:00 |
| 2008-02-24 | Loss | (Korea) Chi In-jin | K-1 ASIA MAX 2008 IN SEOUL | Seoul, South Korea | Decision (unanimous) | 3 | 3:00 |
| 2007-10-25 | Win | (Japan) Fire Harada | AJKF Kick Return Kickboxer of the best 60 Tournament | Tokyo, Japan | Ext.R decision (split) | 4 | 3:00 |
| 2007-08-25 | Loss | (Japan) Hisanori Maeda | AJKF Kick Return Kickboxer of the best 60 Tournament | Tokyo, Japan | TKO (left middle kick) | 5 | 2:40 |
| 2007-06-03 | Win | (Japan) Makoto Nishiyama | J-NETWORK "TEAM DRAGON QUEST 1" | Tokyo, Japan | Decision (unanimous) | 5 | 3:00 |
Wins vacant WFCA World Lightweight title
| 2007-04-15 | Draw | (Japan) Naoki Ishikawa | AJKF New Deal | Tokyo, Japan | Decision (majority) | 5 | 3:00 |
| 2006-12-03 | Win | (Japan) Daisuke Watanabe | SURPRISING 8 MA Japan Kick | Japan | TKO (doctor stoppage) | 3 | 2:39 |
| 2006-09-01 | Win | (Japan) KAWASAKI | J-NETWORK "MACH GO! GO! '06" | Japan | TKO (corner stoppage) | 3 | 2:25 |
| 2006-05-17 | Win | (Japan) Yukihiro Komiya | J-NETWORK "GO! GO! J-NET '06" 〜Invading the DRAGON〜 | Tokyo, Japan | Decision (majority) | 5 | 3:00 |
Wins vacant J-NETWORK Lightweight title
| 2006-01-09 | Win | (Japan) Akihiro Kuroda | J-NETWORK "GO! GO! J-NET '06" 〜Light my fire!〜 | Tokyo, Japan | Ext.R decision (unanimous) | 4 | 3:00 |
| 2005-09-21 | Loss | (Japan) Sota | J-NETWORK "GO! GO! J-NET '05" 〜SKY HIGH〜 | Tokyo, Japan | Ext.R decision (unanimous) | 4 | 3:00 |
| 2005-06-12 | Win | (Japan) Takenori Hosono | J-NETWORK "J-FIGHT 5", Lightweight Rookie Tournament Final | Tokyo, Japan | KO | 1 | 2:04 |
Wins J-NETWORK Lightweight Rookie of the Year title
| 2005-06-12 | Win | (Japan) Hiroshi Iwakiri | J-NETWORK "J-FIGHT 5", Lightweight Rookie Tournament Semi Final | Tokyo, Japan | Decision (unanimous) | 2 | 3:00 |
| 2005-04-10 | Win | (Japan) Fire Harada | J-NETWORK "J-FIGHT 3", Lightweight Rookie Tournament Quarter Final | Tokyo, Japan | Ex.R decision (unanimous) | 4 | 3:00 |
| 2005-02-13 | Win | (Japan) Yoshihiro Ono | J-NETWORK 3 | Tokyo, Japan | TKO (3 knockdowns) | 1 | 1:51 |
| 2004-06-04 | Win | (Japan) Sota Tamura | SHOOT BOXING 2004 Infinity-S Vol.3 | Tokyo, Japan | Decision (unanimous) | 3 | 3:00 |
| 2004-02-11 | Loss | (Japan) Tetsu Fujii | R.I.S.E. VI | Tokyo, Japan | Decision (split) | 3 | 3:00 |
Legend: Win Loss Draw/no contest Notes

== Professional boxing record ==
| 22 fights | 14 wins | 5 losses |
|---|---|---|
| By knockout | 9 | 3 |
| By decision | 5 | 2 |
| Draws | 3 | |

| No. | Result | Record | Opponent | Type | Round, time | Date | Location | Notes |
|---|---|---|---|---|---|---|---|---|
| 22 | Loss | 14–5–3 | (Japan) Toshimitsu Sakai | TD | 8 (8) | Oct 23, 2003 | Korakuen Hall, Tokyo, Japan | |
| 21 | Win | 14–4–3 | (Thailand) Jongkol Wor Surapol | KO | 5 (8) | Jun 3, 2003 | Korakuen Hall, Tokyo, Japan | |
| 20 | Loss | 13–4–3 | (Japan) Shoji Kimura | TKO | 9 (10) | Sep 16, 2002 | Korakuen Hall, Tokyo, Japan | |
| 19 | Win | 13–3–3 | (Indonesia) Virgo Warouw | UD | 10 | May 20, 2002 | Korakuen Hall, Tokyo, Japan | |
| 18 | Win | 12–3–3 | (Thailand) Yoddoi Torjinda | PTS | 8 | Oct 23, 2001 | Korakuen Hall, Tokyo, Japan | |
| 17 | Win | 11–3–3 | (Japan) Tomoki Morikawa | TD | 8 (8) | Jul 16, 2001 | Korakuen Hall, Tokyo, Japan | |
| 16 | Win | 10–3–3 | (Japan) Minato Mizoguchi | PTS | 4 | May 13, 2001 | City Hall, Hofu, Japan | |
| 15 | Win | 9–3–3 | (Japan) Yuichi Ogawa | TKO | 8 (8) | Apr 23, 2001 | Korakuen Hall, Tokyo, Japan | |
| 14 | Win | 8–3–3 | (Japan) Marlon Terado | KO | 2 (8) | Oct 16, 2000 | Korakuen Hall, Tokyo, Japan | |
| 13 | Win | 7–3–3 | (Japan) Daisuke Izawa | PTS | 8 | Jul 17, 2000 | Japan | |
| 12 | Loss | 6–3–3 | (Japan) Jun Toriumi | PTS | 8 | Mar 28, 2000 | Japan | |
| 11 | Loss | 6–2–3 | (Japan) Shigeyuki Sakaemura | PTS | 6 | Dec 10, 1999 | Japan | |
| 10 | Draw | 6–1–3 | (Japan) Taku Yaegashi | PTS | 6 | Sep 9, 1999 | Japan | |
| 9 | Win | 6–1–2 | (Japan) Kosei Takazumi | PTS | 6 | Jun 28, 1999 | Korakuen Hall, Tokyo, Japan | |
| 8 | Win | 5–1–2 | (Japan) Shigeyuki Sakaemura | PTS | 6 | Mar 15, 1999 | Korakuen Hall, Tokyo, Japan | |
| 7 | Win | 4–1–2 | (Japan) Matsunari Nakaishi | TKO | 4 (4) | Oct 2, 1998 | Japan | |
| 6 | Draw | 3–1–2 | (Japan) Masayuki Fujigake | PTS | 4 | Sep 29, 1997 | Japan | |
| 5 | Win | 3–1–1 | (Japan) Shingo Ohashi | PTS | 4 | Aug 1, 1997 | Korakuen Hall, Tokyo, Japan | |
| 4 | Draw | 2–1–1 | (Japan) Daisuke Nishiwaki | PTS | 4 | Jun 20, 1997 | Japan | |
| 3 | Win | 2–1 | (Japan) Angel Kuwabara | KO | 2 (?) | Nov 8, 1996 | Japan | |
| 2 | Loss | 1–1 | (Japan) Takuya Kiya | KO | 2 (?) | Jul 8, 1996 | Japan | |
| 1 | Win | 1–0 | (Japan) Hisashi Matsui | PTS | 4 | Apr 8, 1996 | Japan | |

== See also ==
- List of male kickboxers
