= Mutsuki (disambiguation) =

Mutsuki (Japanese: 睦月; "month of love or affection") is the traditional name of month of January in the Japanese calendar. It may also refer to:

== People with the given name ==
- Mutsuki Ebata (江幡 睦; born 1991), Japanese kickboxer
- Mutsuki Kato (加藤 陸次樹; born 1997), Japanese footballer
- Mutsuki Misaki, an author of Clannad

== Fictional characters ==
- Mutsuki Kamijō
- Mutsuki Tachibana, a fictional character in Fatal Frame II: Crimson Butterfly
- Mutsuki Hajime
- Mutsuki Asagi, a female character in Blue Archive

== Other uses ==
- The Japanese destroyer Mutsuki
