= Wanlop Weerasakreck =

Thai kickboxer and Muay Thai fighter (born 1983)

Wanlop
- Born: Wanlop Kamsee; November 14, 1983 (age 42); Khon Kaen, Thailand
- Other names: Wanlop Pawessar; Wanrop Weerasakreck; Wanrob Weerasakreck
- Nationality: Thai
- Height: 1.70 m (5 ft 7 in)
- Weight: 55 kg (121 lb; 8.7 st)
- Style: Muay Thai
- Stance: Southpaw
- Fighting out of: Tokyo, Japan
- Team: Weerasakreck Fairtex

Kickboxing record
- Total: 74
- Wins: 59
- By knockout: 21
- Losses: 10
- Draws: 5

Wanlop Weerasakreck is a Thai kickboxer and Muay Thai fighter. He is a former WPMF World Super Bantamweight champion.

== Biography ==
Wanlop started training in Muay Thai at 8 years old. He competed over 50 times until the age of 15 with some of his fights reaching side bets of 1 million baht. Wanlop left the world of Muay Thai for 3 years due to fatigue with the lifestyle. At 19 Wanlop moved to Japan to work as a Muay Thai trainer.

Wanlop resumed competition on the Japanese scene in 2003 at the NJKF Vortex II event. He lost by unanimous decision to NJKF featherweight champion Yohei Sakurai. Following this defeat which happened at 58 kg due to poor physical condition after the time off, Wanlop joined the Weerasakreck Nishikawaguchi gym and focused on losing weight. 3 months later at the NJKF Vortex III event Wanlop now fighting under the ringname Wanlop Weerasakreck defeated #1 ranked NJKF Super Bantamweight Kunitaka Fujiwara by unanimous decision.

== Championships and accomplishments ==
- M-1 MuayThai Challenge
  - 2004 M-1 MC Bantamweight Champion
- World Professional Muaythai Federation
  - 2009 WPMF World Super Bantamweight Champion

== Fight Record ==
Professional Kickboxing & Muay Thai record
59 Wins (21 (T)KO's), 10 Losses, 5 Draws, 0 No Contest
Date	Result	Opponent	Event	Location	Method	Round	Time
2009-09-13	Loss	(Japan) Arashi Fujihara	M-1 FAIRTEX SINGHA BEER Muay Thai Challenge 2009 Yod Nak Suu vol.3	Japan	Decision (Majority)	5	3:00
Lost the WPMF World Super Bantamweight title
2009-06-21	Win	(Korea) Choi Jin-sung	M-1 FAIRTEX SINGHA BEER Muay Thai Challenge 2009 Yod Nak Suu vol.2	Tokyo, Japan	TKO (Doctor Stoppage)	1	2:36
2009-01-18	Win	(Thailand) Oddnoi Sor.Wongthong	Muay Lok Japan 2009 〜Saidai Saikyou no Muay THai Matsuri〜	Tokyo, Japan	Decision (Majority)	5	3:00
Wins inaugural WPMF World Super Bantamweight title
2008-11-08	Win	(Japan) Nobuchika Terado	All Japan Kickboxing Federation Krush！～Kickboxing Destruction～	Tokyo, Japan	Decision (Unanimous)	3	3:00
2008-08-10	Win	(Japan) Genki Yamamoto	M-1 FAIRTEX Muay Thai Challenge Legend of Elbows 2008 〜YOD MUAY〜	Tokyo, Japan	TKO (Doctor Stoppage)	2	2:04
2008-07-05	Win	(Thailand) Kanongsuk Weerasakreck	K-1 WORLD MAX & DREAM Presents AKASAKA FIGHT FESTIVAL	Tokyo, Japan	Decision	2	1:38
2008-06-22	Win	(Japan) Masahiro Yamamoto	All Japan Kickboxing Federation Blitz	Tokyo, Japan	KO (left elbow)	2	2:14
2008-06-08	Win	(Japan) Hisanori Maeda	M-1 FAIRTEX SINGHA BEER Muay Thai Challenge Legend of Elbows 2008 〜MIND〜	Tokyo, Japan	TKO (Corner Stoppage)	1	2:54
2008-03-09	Win	(Japan) Nobuchika Terado	M-1 FAIRTEX Muay Thai Challenge Legend of elbows 2008 ～CRASH～	Japan	TKO (Doctor Stoppage)	1	1:49
2007-10-25	Loss	(Japan) Arashi Fujihara	All Japan Kickboxing Federation Kick Return/Kickboxer of the best 60 Tournament ～Final Round～	Tokyo, Japan	Decision (Unanimous)	5	3:00
2007-09-24	Win	(Japan) Takashi Yoneda	M-1 120th ANNIVERSARY OF JAPAN-THAILAND	Tokyo, Japan	TKO	2	2:51
2007-07-21	Win	(Japan) Ueyama NINJA 3000	CHAOS MADMAX II WORLD CHAOS MADMAX	Tokyo, Japan	KO	3	1:35
2007-05-13	Win	(Japan) Takashi Yoneda	NJKF FIGHTING EVOLUTION VI 〜Shinka Suru Tatakai〜	Tokyo, Japan	Decision (Majority)	5	3:00
2007-03-04	Win	(Korea) Son Hong	M-1 FAIRTEX SINGHA BEER Muay Thai Challenge 〜BATTLES OF FATE 2007〜	Tokyo, Japan	TKO (3 Knockdown)	1	2:21
2007-01-04	Draw	(Japan) Naoki Ishikawa	All Japan Kickboxing Federation New Year Kick Festival 2007	Tokyo, Japan	Decision	5	3:00
2006-09-19	Win	(Thailand) Muangson Sor.Punpanmuang	AJKF Suk Fairtex Lumpinee Stadium	Bangkok, Thailand	Decision	5	3:00
2006-06-11	Draw	(Japan) Genki Yamamoto	All Japan Kickboxing Federation Triumph	Tokyo, Japan	Decision	5	3:00
2006-03-19	Win	(Japan) Masahiro Yamamoto	All Japan Kickboxing Federation Sword Fight 2006	Tokyo, Japan	KO (right front kick)	3	2:48
2006-01-22	Win	(Japan) Akinari Morita	MAJKF 〜SURPRISING-1〜	Tokyo, Japan	TKO (Doctor Stoppage)	1	1:32
2005-10-16	Win	(Japan) Arashi Fujihara	All Japan Kickboxing Federation Sword Fight	Tokyo, Japan	KO (Right elbow)	2	0:20
2004-09-19	Win	(Japan) Akifumi Utagawa	SHOOT BOXING WORLD TOURNAMENT S-cup 2004	Tokyo, Japan	TKO (Doctor Stoppage)	1	1:06
2004-04-11	Win	(Japan) Atom Yamada	M-1 Muay Thai Challenge 3	Tokyo, Japan	TKO (Doctor Stoppage)	3	2:45
2004-01-18	Win	(Slovakia) Jotanan Ludov	MAJKF SUPREME-1 〜Saikou no Kick〜	Tokyo, Japan	Decision (Unanimous)	5	3:00
2003-11-02	Win	(Japan) Kunitaka Fujiwara	MUAY THAI CHALLENGE M-1	Tokyo, Japan	TKO	3	1:59
2003-05-16	Win	(Japan) Kunitaka Fujiwara	NJKF VORTEX III	Tokyo, Japan	Decision (Unanimous)	5	3:00
2003-03-09	Loss	(Japan) Yohei Sakurai	NJKF VORTEX II	Tokyo, Japan	Decision (Unanimous)	5	3:00
Legend: Win Loss Draw/No contest Notes

== See also ==
- List of male kickboxers
