= Haruaki Otsuki =

Japanese kickboxer

- Born: Hiroyuki Oonishi; December 30, 1973 (age 52); Kyoto, Japan
- Nationality: Japanese
- Height: 1.65 m (5 ft 5 in)
- Weight: 63 kg (139 lb; 9.9 st)
- Division: Lightweight; Super lightweight
- Style: Kickboxing
- Stance: Southpaw
- Fighting out of: Tokyo, Japan
- Team: AJ Public Gym (1999-2009); Unaffiliated (2010-2013); Kick Star Maskman (2013-present)
- Years active: 1999 - present

Kickboxing record
- Total: 58
- Wins: 43
- By knockout: 30
- Losses: 15
- By knockout: 7

Haruaki Otsuki (大月 晴明, Otsuki Haruaki; born December 30, 1973) is a Japanese kickboxer, currently competing in the super lightweight division of Krush. A professional competitor since 1999, he is the former Krush Super Featherweight champion, the former AJKF Lightweight champion and the 2003 AJKF Lightweight Tournament winner.

== Kickboxing career ==
=== AJKF ===
==== AJFK lightweight champion ====
Otsuki challenged the reigning AJKF lightweight champion Aou Hayashi at AJKF 2003 1th.BOUT - KICK ENERGY on January 4, 2003. He was awarded a third-round technical knockout, after knocking Hayashi down three times by the 1:32 minute mark.

After capturing the AJKF lightweight title, Otsuki participated in the 2003 AJKF lightweight tournament. Otsuki was booked to face Takahito Fujimasa in the quarterfinals, which were held on March 8, 2003. He won the fight by a first-round knockout. Otsuki faced Susumu Daigūji in the penultimate bout of the tournament on May 23, 2003. He won fight by a third-round knockout. Otsuki advanced to the tournament finals, held on the same day, where he faced Tsogto Amara. He won the fight by a second-round technical knockout.

Otsuki faced Andrea Ronchi in a non-title bout at AJKF 2003 KNOCK DOWN on September 27, 2003. Ronchi retired from the fight at the end of the fourth round.

Otsuki made his first AJKF lightweight title defense against Takahito Fujimasa at AJKF 2004 Wilderness on January 4, 2004. He won the fight by a first-round knockout, stopping Fujimasa with a spinning backfist near the end of the opening round. Otsuki vacated the title on September 25, 2004.

==== Post title reign ====
Otsuki challenged the reigning WPKC World muay thai champion Satoshi Kobayashi at AJKF Survivor on January 4, 2005. He won the fight by a third-round knockout.

Otsuki faced Masami Yamamoto at AJKF Solid Fist on November 12, 2006. He won the fight by unanimous decision, with scores of 30–28, 30–28 and 30–29. Otsuki next faced Jon Sung Min at AJKF New Year Kick Festival 2007 on January 4, 2007. He won the fight by a first-round knockout.

Otsuki's two-fight winning streak was snapped by Hiromasa Masuda at AJKF: Departure Norainu FINAL on March 9, 2007, who beat him by unanimous decision. Otsuki suffered his second consecutive loss on June 17, 2007, as Kupee Wor.Steera beat him by unanimous decision at AJKF's Thailand event.

Otsuki was booked to face Kanongsuk Weerasakreck in the quarterfinal bout of the AJKF 60 kg tournament, which was held on August 25, 2007. He won the fight by a fifth-round technical knockout. Otsuki advanced to the semifinals, held on October 25, 2007, where he faced Naoki Maeda. He won the fight by unanimous decision. Otsuki fought Masahiro Yamamoto in the tournament finals, which were held on the same day. He lost the fight by unanimous decision.

=== Krush ===
==== Early Krush career ====
Otsuki made his K-1 promotional debut against David Douge at K-1 WORLD MAX 2008 World Championship Tournament FINAL 8 on July 7, 2008. He won the fight by a third-round knockout. Otsuki made his second K-1 appearance against Ryuji Kajiwara at K-1 World MAX 2008 World Championship Tournament Final on October 1, 2008. He won the fight by unanimous decision, with scores of 30–28, 29–28 and 30–29.

Otsuki made his Krush debut against Naoki Ishikawa at Krush 2 on March 14, 2009. He won the fight by a third-round knockout, flooring Ishikawa with a right hook late in the round. After winning his promotional debut, Otsuki was scheduled to participate in the 2009 Krush lightweight grand prix. Although he beat Hiroshi Iwakiri by a first-round technical knockout in the opening round of the tournament, he lost a majority decision to Masahiro Yamamoto in the quarterfinals, which were held on the same day.

Otsuki faced Akihiro Kuroda at Krush × Survivor on March 13, 2010. He won the fight by unanimous decision, with scores of 30–28, 30–28 and 30–29. Otsuki was unable to build on this victory however, as he lost a unanimous decision to Yoshimichi Matsumoto on May 2, 2010.

Otsuki returned from a three-year absence from the sport to face Taishi Hiratsuka at Krush 34 on November 10, 2013. He won the fight by a first-round knockout. Otsuki was next booked to face Tomohiro Oikawa in Oikawa's retirement fight at SHOOT BOXING 2013 on December 23, 2013. He won the fight by unanimous decision, after two extra rounds were contested. Otsuki extended his winning streak to three straight fights at Krush 37 on April 1, 2014, as he beat Junpei Aotsu by split decision, after an extra round was contested.

==== Krush super featherweight champion ====
His three fight winning streak earned Otsuki the chance to challenge the reigning Krush Super Featherweight champion Kan Itabashi at Krush 41 on May 11, 2014. He won the fight by unanimous decision, with scores of 28–26, 28–26 and 29–26.

Otsuki faced Hiroshi Momoi at NKB 2014 Kissui Series VOL.3 on June 15, 2014. He won the fight by a first-round technical knockout, stopping Momoi with a combination of punches after just 55 seconds. Otsuki vacated the title on October 17, 2014, as he was unable to make a title defense in the mandated time.

Otsuki faced Leona Pettas, in his first fight post-title reign, at Krush.50 on April 1, 2015. He won the fight by unanimous decision, with all three judges scoring the bout 27–25 in his favor.

=== NKB and KNOCKOUT ===
Otsuki faced Akira Takemura at NKB Yamato Damashii Series VOL.2 on April 11, 2015. He won the fight by a first-round stoppage, as Damashii's corner threw in the towel at the 1:36 minute mark. Otsuki next faced Hideki Soga at NJKF WINNERS 2015 2nd on May 17, 2015. He won the fight by unanimous decision, with scores of 49–47, 50–46 and 49–47.

Otsuki made his REBELS promotional debut against Yasuyuki at REBELS.38 on September 16, 2015. He lost the fight by a third-round technical knockout. Otsuki next faced Taison Maeguchi at NO KICK NO LIFE 2016 on March 12, 2016. Maeguchi won the fight by a third-round technical knockout.

Otsuki faced Hideki Soga at NJKF Superkick on April 10, 2016. He won the fight by a third-round knockout. Six months later, at SIAM WARRIORS SUPERFIGHTS on October 22, 2016, Otsuki won the ISKA Muay Thai Intercontinental Super Lightweight title with a first-round knockout of Saen Kransi. Otsuki was next booked to face Starboy Kwaythong Gym at the inaugural KNOCK OUT event on December 5, 2016. He won the fight by a first-round knockout.

Otsuki traded wins and losses over his next four fights. He first lost to Yuto Tsujide by a first-round knockout at HOOST CUP KINGS KYOTO 2 on March 5, 2017. Otsuki next beat Mitsuru Nakao by a first-round knockout at KNOCK OUT vol.5 on October 4, 2017. Two months later, at KNOCK OUT 2017 in Ryogoku on December 10, 2017, Otsuki suffered a third-round stoppage loss to Hikaru Machida. Otsuki rebounded from this loss with a second-round knockout of Yuma Yamaguchi at KNOCK OUT 2018 OSAKA 1st on May 3, 2018. Otsuki faced Yosuke Morii at KNOCK OUT SUMMER FES.2018 on August 19, 2018. Morii won the fight by a late second-round knockout.

Otsuki faced the Shootboxing Japan lightweight champion Renta Nishioka at SHOOT BOXING S-cup 65 kg World TOURNAMENT 2018 on November 16, 2018. He lost the fight by unanimous decision, with scores of 28–27, 28–26 and 28–26.

Otsuki was booked to face Reo Nomura at NKB Shutsujin Series vol.2 on April 13, 2019. He won the fight by unanimous decision, with scores of 30–28, 30–27 and 30–27.

=== Return to Krush ===
Otsuki faced Hitoshi Aketo at Krush 121 on January 23, 2021, in his promotional debut to Krush, following a two-year absence from competition. He won the fight by a third-round knockout, flooring Aketo with a right overhand.

Otsuki faced Hisaki Higashimoto at Krush 143 on November 26, 2022. He lost the fight by split decision, after an extra fourth round was contested.

Otsuki faced Katsuji at the July 9, 2023, NO KICK NO LIFE event. He lost the fight by a fifth-round knockout.

== Championships and awards ==
- All Japan Kickboxing Federation
  - 2003 AJKF Lightweight Championship
    - One successful title defense
  - 2003 AJKF Lightweight (-62 kg) Tournament Winner
  - 2007 AJKF Lightweight (-62 kg) Tournament Runner-up
- World Professional Kickboxing and Muay Thai Council
  - 2005 WPKC World Muay Thai Lightweight Championship
- Krush
  - 2014 Krush Super Featherweight (-60kg) Championship
- International Sport Karate Association
  - 2016 ISKA Muay Thai Intercontinental Super Lightweight Championship

== Kickboxing record ==
Kickboxing record
43 wins (30 (T)KOs), 15 losses
Date	Result	Opponent	Event	Location	Method	Round	Time
2023-07-09	Loss	(Japan) Katsuji	NO KICK NO LIFE	Tokyo, Japan	KO (Low kick)	5	2:16
2022-11-26	Loss	(Japan) Hisaki Higashimoto	Krush 143	Tokyo, Japan	Ext.R Decision (Split)	4	3:00
2021-01-23	Win	(Japan) Hitoshi Aketo	Krush 121	Tokyo, Japan	KO (Right Overhand)	3	1:00
2019-04-13	Win	(Japan) Reo Nomura	NKB Shutsujin Series vol.2	Tokyo, Japan	Decision (Unanimous)	3	3:00
2018-11-18	Loss	(Japan) Renta Nishioka	SHOOT BOXING S-cup 65 kg World TOURNAMENT 2018	Tokyo, Japan	Decision (Unanimous)	3	3:00
2018-08-19	Loss	(Japan) Yosuke Morii	KNOCK OUT SUMMER FES.2018	Tokyo, Japan	KO (Punches)	3	2:52
2018-05-03	Win	(Japan) Yuma Yamaguchi	KNOCK OUT 2018 OSAKA 1st	Osaka, Japan	KO (Punches)	2	1:20
2017-12-10	Loss	(Japan) Hikaru Machida	KNOCK OUT 2017 in Ryogoku	Tokyo, Japan	TKO (Corner Stoppage)	3	2:07
2017-10-04	Win	(Japan) Mitsuru Nakao	KNOCK OUT vol.5	Tokyo, Japan	KO (Punches)	1	2:49
2017-03-05	Loss	(Japan) Yuto Tsujide	HOOST CUP KINGS KYOTO 2	Tokyo, Japan	KO (Left Straight)	1	2:39
2016-12-05	Win	(Thailand) Starboy Kwaythong Gym	KNOCK OUT Vol.0	Tokyo, Japan	KO (Punches)	1	2:39
2016-10-22	Win	(Thailand) Saen Kransi	SIAM WARRIORS SUPERFIGHTS	Tokyo, Japan	KO (Punches)	1	2:39
Wins ISKA Muay Thai Intercontinental Super Lightweight title.
2016-04-10	Win	(Japan) Hideki Soga	NJKF Superkick	Tokyo, Japan	TKO (Punches)	3	2:39
2016-03-12	Loss	(Japan) Taison Maeguchi	NO KICK NO LIFE 2016	Tokyo, Japan	TKO (Doctor Stop)	3	0:47
2015-09-16	Loss	(Japan) Yasuyuki	REBELS.38	Tokyo, Japan	TKO (Corner Stoppage)	3	0:50
2015-05-17	Win	(Japan) Hideki Soga	NJKF WINNERS 2015 2nd	Tokyo, Japan	Decision (Unanimous)	5	3:00
2015-04-11	Win	(Japan) Akira Takemura	NKB Yamato Damashii Series VOL.2	Tokyo, Japan	TKO (Corner stoppage)	1	1:36
2015-01-04	Win	(Japan) Leona Pettas	Krush.50	Japan	Decision (Unanimous)	3	3:00
2014-06-15	Win	(Japan) Hiroshi Momoi	NKB 2014 Kissui Series VOL.3	Japan	TKO (Punches)	1	0:55
2014-05-11	Win	(Japan) Kan Itabashi	Krush 41	Tokyo, Japan	Decision (Unanimous)	3	3:00
Wins Krush Super Featherweight title.
2014-01-04	Win	(Japan) Junpei Aotsu	Krush 37	Tokyo, Japan	Ext.R Decision (Split)	4	3:00
2013-12-23	Win	(Japan) Tomohiro Oikawa	SHOOT BOXING 2013	Osaka, Japan	2nd Ext.R Decision (Unanimous)	7	3:00
2013-11-10	Win	(Japan) Taishi Hiratsuka	Krush 34	Tokyo, Japan	KO (Left Hook)	1	1:09
2010-05-09	Win	(Thailand) Kenkaw Lukprabat	Adison Stadium	Saraburi, Thailand	KO (Left hook to the body)	1	2:21
2010-05-02	Loss	(Japan) Yoshimichi Matsumoto	K-1 World MAX 2010 –63 kg Japan Tournament	Tokyo, Japan	Decision (Unanimous)	3	3:00
2010-03-13	Win	(Japan) Akihiro Kuroda	Krush × Survivor	Tokyo, Japan	Decision (Unanimous)	3	3:00
2009-07-24	Loss	(Japan) Masahiro Yamamoto	Krush Lightweight Grand Prix 2009 〜Round.1〜, Quarter Finals	Tokyo, Japan	Decision (majority)	3	3:00
2009-07-24	Win	(Japan) Hiroshi Iwakiri	Krush Lightweight Grand Prix 2009 〜Round.1〜, First Round	Tokyo, Japan	TKO (Two knockdown rule)	1	2:31
2009-03-14	Win	(Japan) Naoki Ishikawa	Krush 2	Tokyo, Japan	KO (Right Hook)	3	2:37
2008-10-01	Win	(Japan) Ryuji Kajiwara	K-1 World MAX 2008 World Championship Tournament Final	Tokyo, Japan	Decision (Unanimous)	3	3:00
2008-07-07	Win	(France) David Douge	K-1 WORLD MAX 2008 World Championship Tournament FINAL 8	Tokyo, Japan	KO (3 Knockdowns/Left Hook)	3	2:59
2007-10-25	Loss	(Japan) Masahiro Yamamoto	AJKF: The Best of 60 kg Tournament 2007 Final, Final	Tokyo, Japan	Decision (Unanimous)	5	3:00
2007-10-25	Win	(Japan) Naoki Maeda	AJKF: The Best of 60 kg Tournament 2007 Final, Semi Final	Tokyo, Japan	Decision (Unanimous)	3	3:00
2007-08-25	Win	(Thailand) Kanongsuk Weerasakreck	AJKF: The Best of 60 kg Tournament 2007, Quarter Final	Tokyo, Japan	TKO (Left Hook)	5	2:21
2007-06-17	Loss	(Thailand) Kupee Wor.Steera	AJKF Thailand		Decision (Unanimous)	5	3:00
2007-03-09	Loss	(Japan) Hiromasa Masuda	AJKF: Departure Norainu FINAL	Tokyo, Japan	Decision (Unanimous)	3	3:00
2007-01-04	Win	(Korea) Jon Sung Min	AJKF New Year Kick Festival 2007	Tokyo, Japan	KO (Body Punches)	1	2:07
2006-11-12	Win	(Japan) Masami Yamamoto	AJKF Solid Fist	Tokyo, Japan	Decision (Unanimous)	3	3:00
2005-12-19	Loss	(Thailand) Chonlek Kaewsamrit	Siam Omnoi Boxing Stadium	Bangkok, Thailand	TKO	4	
2005-01-04	Win	(Japan) Satoshi Kobayashi	AJKF Survivor	Tokyo, Japan	KO (Punches)	3	2:31
Wins WPKC World Muay Thai Lightweight title.
2004-10-17	Win	(Netherlands) Mustapha Ziani	AJKF	Tokyo, Japan	Decision (Majority)	3	3:00
2004-04-16	Win	(Korea) Chae Yeon Ik	AJKF	Tokyo, Japan	KO	2	2:08
2004-01-04	Win	(Japan) Takahito Fujimasa	AJKF 2004 Wilderness	Tokyo, Japan	KO (Back Fist)	1	2:22
Defends AJKF Lightweight title.
2003-09-27	Win	(Italy) Andrea Ronchi	AJKF 2003 KNOCK DOWN	Tokyo, Japan	TKO (Corner Stoppage)	4	3:00
2003-05-23	Win	(Mongolia) Tsogto Amara	AJKF Lightweight Tournament, Final	Tokyo, Japan	TKO (Doctor Stoppage)	2	0:37
Wins 2003 AJKF Lightweight Tournament.
2003-05-23	Win	(Japan) Susumu Daigūji	AJKF Lightweight Tournament, Semi Final	Tokyo, Japan	KO (Left Hook)	3	2:21
2003-03-08	Win	(Japan) Takahito Fujimasa	AJKF Lightweight Tournament, Quarter Final	Tokyo, Japan	KO (Right Straight)	1	1:41
2003-01-04	Win	(Japan) Aou Hayashi	AJKF 2003 1th.BOUT - KICK ENERGY	Tokyo, Japan	KO (3 Knockdowns/Right Hook)	3	1:32
Wins AJKF Lightweight title.
2002-07-21	Win	(Japan) Aou Hayashi	AJKF	Tokyo, Japan	TKO (3 Knockdowns/Punches)	1	1:46
2002-03-30	Win	(Japan) Hiromasa Masuda	MA Japan Kick	Tokyo, Japan	KO (Right Middle Kick)	1	0:53
2001-04-06	Win	(Japan) Atsushi Tateshima	AJKF	Tokyo, Japan	KO (Right Uppercut)	5	1:10
2000-11-29	Win	(Japan) Soul Tiger Han	AJKF	Tokyo, Japan	KO	1	1:41
2000-10-22	Win	(Japan) Naoyuki Sugie	AJKF	Tokyo, Japan	KO	1	2:03
2000-09-13	Win	(Japan) Makoto Hasegawa	AJKF	Tokyo, Japan	KO	1	2:31
2000-07-30	Win	(Japan) Naoki Maeda	AJKF	Tokyo, Japan	KO	1	2:05
2000-03-16	Win	(Japan) Masashi Kamon	AJKF	Tokyo, Japan	Decision (Unanimous)	3	3:00
1999-10-08	Win	(Japan) Tomoyuki Morishita	AJKF	Tokyo, Japan	KO	1	1:12
Legend: Win Loss Draw/No contest Notes

== See also ==
- List of male kickboxers
- List of Krush champions
