= Genki Yamamoto (kickboxer) =

Japanese kickboxer

- Born: 山本元気; August 2, 1977 (age 49); Kyoto prefecture, Japan
- Nationality: Japanese
- Height: 166 cm (5 ft 5 in)
- Weight: 60.0 kg (132.3 lb; 9.45 st)
- Stance: Orthodox
- Fighting out of: Osaka, Japan (2000-2005); Kōtō, Japan (2005-2011)
- Team: REX JAPAN (2000-2005); DEION (2006-2011)
- Years active: 2000 - 2011

Kickboxing record
- Total: 37
- Wins: 20
- By knockout: 11
- Losses: 12
- By knockout: 5
- Draws: 5

Other information
- Occupation: Coach at the DEION gym

Genki Yamamoto (Japanese: 山本元気, Yamamoto Genki; born August 2, 1977) is a retired Japanese kickboxer, who competed professionally between 2000 and 2011. Yamamoto most notably competed in the featherweight division of AJKF, where he held the AJKF featherweight championship, and in the lightweight division of Krush.

== Professional kickboxing career ==
=== AJKF ===
==== Early career ====
Yamamoto made his professional debut against Masamitsu Takayama at AJKF YOUNG GUN on January 28, 2000. He won the fight by unanimous decision. Yamamoto was then booked to face SHI-LOW at AJKF LEGEND III on March 16, 2000. He won the fight by unanimous decision. Yamamoto's three fight winning streak was snapped at AJKF LEGEND-VIII on September 13, 2000, as he fought to a unanimous decision draw with Naoki Ishikawa.

Yamamoto faced Makoto Hasegawa at AJKF JUST BRING IT! on May 17, 2001. He won the fight by a dominant unanimous decision, with all three judges scoring the fight 30–24 in his favor. Yamamoto next fought a rematch with Naoki Ishikawa at AJKF BLAZE UP on July 22, 2001. Ishikawa handed Yamamoto his first professional loss, as he won the fight by unanimous decision. Yamamoto fought to a unanimous decision draw with Masashi Kamon at AJKF LIGHT ON! on November 30, 2001, in his final fight of the year.

Yamamoto faced Yasuhiko Murayama at AJKF GOLDEN TRIGGER on September 6, 2002, following a 10-month absence from the sport. He won the fight by unanimous decision. Yamamoto was booked to face Keisuke Abe at AJKF DEAD HEAT on June 20, 2003. He won the fight by a second-round knockout. This two-fight winning streak earned Yamamoto the fight Naoki Ishikawa in a trilogy match at AJKF KNOCK DOWN on September 27, 2003, in an AJFK super featherweight title eliminator. He won the fight by a second-round technical knockout, after knocking Ishikawa down three times by the 2:12 minute mark of the second round.

==== AJKF featherweight champion ====
Yamamoto challenged the reigning AJKF featherweight champion Hisanori Maeda at AJKF Fujiwara Festival on December 7, 2003. He won the fight by a third-round knockout, flooring Maeda with a right hook.

After winning the AJKF title, Yamamoto was booked to face Rabbit Seki in a non-title bout at AJKF All Japan Lightweight Tournament 1st. Stage on March 13, 2004. He won the fight by a fifth-round knockout. Yamamoto faced Cristo Dimitrakakis in another non-title bout at AJKF SUPER FIGHT -LIGHTNING- on August 22, 2004. He made quick work of Dimitrakakis, as he won the bout by a first-round knockout.

Yamamoto made his first AJFK featherweight title defense against Masahiro Yamamoto at AJKF Fujiwara Festival 2004 on December 5, 2004. The fight was ruled a unanimous decision draw, with scores of 48–48, 49–49 and 49–49.

After making his first successful title defense, Yamamoto was booked to face Jonathan Muyal in a non-title bout at AJKF RUSH! on March 18, 2005. He won the fight by a first-round knockout. Yamamoto faced Chanchai Maimuangkon in another non-title bout at AJKF STRAIGHT on May 15, 2005. He won the fight by a first-round knockout, stopping Chanchai with a right hook at the very end of the round. Yamamoto's eleven fight undefeated streak was snapped by Kaew Fairtex at AJKF Super Fight Japan vs World on July 24, 2005, who beat Yamamoto by a unanimous decision. Yamamoto was then booked to face Kompayak Fairtex at AJKF SWORD FIGHT Japan vs Thailand on October 16, 2005. He suffered his second consecutive loss, as Kompayak won the fight by a third-round technical knockout. It was the first losing streak of his five year professional career.

Yamamoto made his second AJFK featherweight title defense against Masahiro Yamamoto at AJKF New Year Kick Festival 2006 on April 1, 2006. Yamamoto lost the fight by a narrow majority decision, with scores of 50–50, 50–49 and 50–49.

==== Later AJFK career ====
Yamamoto rebounded from his title loss with a first-round knockout of Kanongsuk Fairtex at AJKF SWORD FIGHT 2006 on March 19, 2006. Yamamoto next faced Wanlop Weerasakreck at AJKF Triumph on June 11, 2006. The fight was ruled a draw by majority decision. Yamamoto faced another Thai opponent, Sianchai Jirakliengkri, at AJKF Rearm on May 11, 2007. The fight was ruled a unanimous decision draw.

Yamamoto challenged the reigning WBC Muaythai World Super featherweight champion Kaew Fairtex at the September 8, 2007 World Championship Muaythai event. He lost the fight by unanimous decision.

Yamamoto was booked to fight a quadrilogy bout with Naoki Ishikawa at AJKF Spring Storm on April 24, 2008. He lost the fight by a third-round technical knockout, as the ringside physician stopped the bout due to a cut on Yamamoto's forehead. Yamamoto was scheduled to rematch Wanlop Weerasakreck at M-1 FAIRTEX Muay Thai Challenge Legend of Elbows 2008 〜YOD MUAY〜 on August 10, 2008. He lost the fight by a second-round technical knockout, once again due to a cut.

=== Krush ===
Yamamoto made his Krush debut against Yohei Sakurai at AJKF Krush! 〜Kickboxing Destruction〜 on November 8, 2008. He won the fight by a third-round knockout, stopping Sakurai with a right hook at the 1:34 minute mark. Yamamoto next faced Ryuji Kajiwara at AJKF Krush 2 on March 14, 2009. He won the fight by unanimous decision, with all three judges scoring the bout 30–28 in his favor. Yamamoto extended his winning streak to three straight fights at AJKF Norainu Dengekisakusen 2009 on June 21, 2009, with a unanimous decision victory against Jaumeaw Phumpanmuang.

Yamamoto took part in the inaugural Krush lightweight tournament, and faced Keiji Ozaki in the opening round which took place on August 14, 2009. He won the fight by unanimous decision. Yamamoto faced Hisanori Maeda in the tournament quarterfinals, which were held on the same day. He once again won the fight by unanimous decision. Yamamoto faced Masahiro Yamamoto in the semifinal bout of the tournament, which was held on February 11, 2009. He lost the fight by unanimous decision, after an extra round was fought.

After losing in the penultimate bout of the Krush tournament, Yamamoto went on a three fight losing streak. He first lost to Rashata by technical knockout at NJKF on May 9, 2010, which was followed by a unanimous decision loss to Kanongsuk Weerasakreck at Sengoku Soul of Fight on December 30, 2010. Yamamoto suffered his fourth straight professional loss to Kan Itabashi at REBELS.8 & IT’S SHOWTIME JAPAN countdown-1 on July 18, 2011, who beat him by an extra round unanimous decision.

Yamamoto announced his retirement from the sport on August 30, 2011.

== Titles and accomplishments ==
- All Japan Kickboxing Federation
  - AJKF Featherweight Championship
    - Once successful title defense
  - 2005 "Fighter of the Year"
  - 2006 "Fight of the Year" vs. Wanlop Weerasakreck

== Professional kickboxing record ==
Professional Kickboxing Record
20 Wins (11 (T)KO's), 12 Losses, 5 Draws, 0 No Contest
Date	Result	Opponent	Event	Location	Method	Round	Time
2011-07-18	Loss	(Japan) Kan Itabashi	REBELS.8 & IT’S SHOWTIME JAPAN countdown-1	Tokyo, Japan	Ext.R Decision (Unanimous)	4	3:00
2010-12-30	Loss	(Thailand) Kanongsuk Weerasakreck	Sengoku Soul of Fight	Tokyo, Japan	Decision (Unanimous)	5	3:00
2010-05-09	Loss	(Japan) Rashata	NJKF	Tokyo, Japan	TKO (Doctor Stoppage)	3	2:59
2009-11-02	Loss	(Japan) Masahiro Yamamoto	Krush "Krush Lightweight GP 2009 -Final Round-" Semi Final	Tokyo, Japan	Ext.R Decision (Unanimous)	4	3:00
2009-08-14	Win	(Japan) Hisanori Maeda	Krush "Krush Lightweight GP 2009 -Opening Round.2-" Quarter Final	Tokyo, Japan	Decision (Unanimous)	3	3:00
2009-08-14	Win	(Japan) Keiji Ozaki	Krush "Krush Lightweight GP 2009 -Opening Round.2-" Round of 16	Tokyo, Japan	Decision (Unanimous)	3	3:00
2009-06-21	Win	(Thailand) Jaumeaw Phumpanmuang	AJKF Norainu Dengekisakusen 2009	Tokyo, Japan	Decision (Unanimous)	5	3:00
2009-03-14	Win	(Japan) Ryuji Kajiwara	AJKF Krush 2	Tokyo, Japan	Decision (Unanimous)	3	3:00
2008-11-08	Win	(Japan) Yohei Sakurai	AJKF Krush! 〜Kickboxing Destruction〜	Tokyo, Japan	KO (Right Hook)	3	1:34
2008-08-10	Loss	(Thailand) Wanlop Weerasakreck	M-1 FAIRTEX Muay Thai Challenge Legend of Elbows 2008 〜YOD MUAY〜	Tokyo, Japan	TKO (Doctor Stoppage)	2	2:04
2008-04-26	Loss	(Japan) Naoki Ishikawa	AJKF Spring Storm	Tokyo, Japan	TKO (Doctor Stoppage)	3	2:37
2007-09-08	Loss	(Thailand) Kaew Fairtex	World Championship Muaythai	California, USA	Decision (Unanimous)	5	3:00
For the WBC Muay Thai World Super Featherweight title.
2007-05-11	Draw	(Thailand) Saenchai Jirakriengkrai	AJKF Rearm	Tokyo, Japan	Decision (Unanimous)	5	3:00
2006-09-19	Loss	(Thailand) Kupee Wor.Steera	Lumpinee Stadium	Bangkok, Thailand	TKO (Doctor Stoppage)	2	
2006-06-11	Draw	(Thailand) Wanlop Weerasakreck	AJKF Triumph	Tokyo, Japan	Decision (Majority)	5	3:00
2006-03-19	Win	(Thailand) Kanongsuk Fairtex	AJKF SWORD FIGHT 2006	Tokyo, Japan	KO (Left Hook to the Body)	1	2:44
2006-01-04	Loss	(Japan) Masahiro Yamamoto	AJKF New Year Kick Festival 2006	Tokyo, Japan	Decision (Majority)	5	3:00
Loses the AJKF Featherweight title.
2005-10-16	Loss	(Thailand) Kompayak Fairtex	AJKF SWORD FIGHT Japan vs Thailand	Tokyo, Japan	TKO (Doctor Stoppage)	3	1:41
2005-07-24	Loss	(Thailand) Kaew Fairtex	AJKF Super Fight Japan vs World	Tokyo, Japan	Decision (Unanimous)	5	3:00
2005-05-15	Win	(Thailand) Chanchai Maimuangkon	AJKF STRAIGHT	Tokyo, Japan	KO (Right Hook)	1	3:00
2005-03-18	Win	(France) Jonathan Muyal	AJKF RUSH!	Tokyo, Japan	KO (Right Hook)	1	1:52
2004-12-05	Draw	(Japan) Masahiro Yamamoto	AJKF Fujiwara Festival 2004	Tokyo, Japan	Decision (Unanimous)	5	3:00
Defends the AJKF Featherweight title.
2004-09-25	Win	(Thailand) Jakapop Sitjomtrai	Lumpinee Stadium	Bangkok, Thailand	KO (Punches)	3	0:18
2004-08-22	Win	(Belgium) Cristo Dimitrakakis	AJKF SUPER FIGHT -LIGHTNING-	Tokyo, Japan	KO (Right Hook)	1	1:45
2004-03-13	Win	(Japan) Rabbit Seki	AJKF All Japan Lightweight Tournament 1st. Stage	Tokyo, Japan	KO (Punches)	5	1:06
2003-12-07	Win	(Japan) Hisanori Maeda	AJKF Fujiwara Festival	Tokyo, Japan	KO (Right Hook)	3	0:47
Wins the AJKF Featherweight title.
2003-09-27	Win	(Japan) Naoki Ishikawa	AJKF KNOCK DOWN, Featherweight title next challenger fight	Tokyo, Japan	TKO (3 Knockdowns/Low Kick)	2	2:12
2003-06-20	Win	(Japan) Keisuke Abe	AJKF DEAD HEAT	Tokyo, Japan	KO (Punches)	2	2:20
2002-12-18	Win	(Japan) Satoruvashicoba	AJKF BACK FROM HELL-II	Tokyo, Japan	TKO (Doctor Stoppage)	1	
2002-09-06	Win	(Japan) Yasuhiko Murayama	AJKF GOLDEN TRIGGER	Tokyo, Japan	Decision (Unanimous)	3	3:00
2001-11-30	Draw	(Japan) Masashi Kamon	AJKF LIGHT ON!	Tokyo, Japan	Decision (Unanimous)	3	3:00
2001-07-22	Loss	(Japan) Naoki Ishikawa	AJKF BLAZE UP	Tokyo, Japan	Decision (Unanimous)	3	3:00
2001-05-17	Win	(Japan) Makoto Hasegawa	AJKF JUST BRING IT!	Tokyo, Japan	Decision (Unanimous)	3	3:00
2000-09-13	Draw	(Japan) Naoki Ishikawa	AJKF LEGEND-VIII	Tokyo, Japan	Decision (Unanimous)	3	3:00
2000-03-16	Win	(Japan) Hisanori Maeda	AJKF LEGEND IV	Tokyo, Japan	Decision (Unanimous)	3	3:00
2000-03-16	Win	(Japan) SHI-LOW	AJKF LEGEND III	Tokyo, Japan	Decision (Unanimous)	3	3:00
2000-01-28	Win	(Japan) Masamitsu Takayama	AJKF YOUNG GUN	Tokyo, Japan	Decision (Unanimous)	3	3:00
Legend: Win Loss Draw/No contest Notes

== See also ==
- List of male kickboxers
- All Japan Kickboxing Federation
