= Kan Itabashi =

Japanese kickboxer

- Born: 板橋 寛 September 1, 1982 (age 44); Fukushima, Japan
- Other names: High speed lefty
- Nationality: Japanese
- Height: 167 cm (5 ft 6 in)
- Weight: 60.0 kg (132.3 lb; 9.45 st)
- Stance: Southpaw
- Fighting out of: Tokyo, Japan
- Team: Tokyo Sports College (2005); Daiseijuku (2005-2006); Scramble Shibuya (2007-2014)
- Years active: 2005 - 2014

Kickboxing record
- Total: 33
- Wins: 24
- By knockout: 5
- Losses: 7
- By knockout: 2
- Draws: 2

Kan Itabashi (板橋 寛, Itabashi Kan) is a retired Japanese kickboxer. A professional competitor between 2005 and 2014, Itabashi is the former RISE and Krush super featherweight champion.

== Kickboxing career ==
=== RISE ===
==== Early career ====
Itabashi made his professional debut against Daisuke Urata at TRIAL LEAGUE.1 on March 20, 2005. He won the fight by unanimous decision, with scores of 28–27, 29–27 and 29–27. Itabashi faced Junichi Kato in the second TRIAL LEAGUE event, held on June 26, 2005. He was once again victorious by unanimous decision. Itabashi made his AJKF debut against Yasuhiro Hamashima at AJKF "Muay Thai Wave from YOKOHAMA 4" on July 31, 2005. He won the fight by unanimous decision.

Itabashi faced Masaya Takahashi at R.I.S.E. G-BAZOOKA TOURNAMENT '06 on March 26, 2006, in his RISE promotional debut. He won the fight by unanimous decision. After beating Ryoma by unanimous decision at R.I.S.E. XXV on April 29, 2006, Itabashi was booked to face Tomoaki Suehiro R.I.S.E. FLASH to CRUSH TOURNAMENT '06 on June 25, 2006, in the quarterfinal bout of the 2006 RISE super featherweight tournament. He lost the fight by a first-round technical knockout.

Following his first professional loss, Itabashi was booked to face KAWASAKI at R.I.S.E. XXXV on April 29, 2007. He won the fight by unanimous decision. After successfully rebounding from his loss, Itabashi participated faced Yusuke Sugawara in the quarterfinals of the one-day RISE super featherweight tournament. He won the fight by unanimous decision. Itabashi advanced to the semifinals, where he faced Tomoaki Suehiro. He lost the fight by a second-round technical knockout.

Itabashi faced Nagaoka R.I.S.E. -β- "L7" on October 28, 2007. He won the fight by unanimous decision. Itabashi was then booked to face Akihiro Kuroda at J-NETWORK "Let's Kick with J 1st" on February 29, 2008. The fight was ruled a draw by unanimous decision.

After amassing an 8–2–2 record, Itabashi would go on a four fight winning streak, before challenging for a title. Itabashi first beat Fire Hiroshi by majority decision at RISE 44 on March 30, 2008. He was then booked to face Yu Akiyama at RISE 46 on May 11, 2008, whom he beat by unanimous decision. Itabashi extended his winning streak to three straight fights at RISE 49 on August 30, 2008, with a third-round knockout of Tomoya Miyashita. Itabashi faced Tomoaki Suehiro at RISE 51 on November 30, 2008, in his final fight of the year. He won the bout by majority decision.

==== Super featherweight champion ====
Itabashi challenged the reigning RISE Super Featherweight titleholder Yuki at RISE 52 on January 31, 2009. He won the fight by unanimous decision, with scores of 49–44, 49–46 and 49–43.

Itabashi made his first RISE title defense against TURBΦ at RISE 57 on July 26, 2009. He won the fight by split decision. Two of the judges scored the fight 49–47 and 49–48 in his favor, while the third judge scored it 49–48 for TURBΦ.

Itabashi made his second RISE title defense against the 2006 RISE Dead Or Alive Tournament tournament winner Keiji Ozaki at RISE 60 on November 22, 2009. He won the fight by a second-round knockout, flooring Ozaki with a flurry of punches.

Itabashi fought in three non-title bouts, following his first two title defenses. He first lost to Masahiro Yamamoto by unanimous decision at RISE 63 on April 7, 2010, but successfully rebounded with decision victories against Kanongsuk Weerasakreck at RISE 68 on July 31, 2010 and Anuwat Kaewsamrit at KGS "RISE 71" on October 3, 2010.

Itabashi made his third RISE title defense against Kosuke Komiyama at RISE 74 on February 27, 2011. He lost the fight by split decision.

Itabashi faced Genki Yamamoto at REBELS.8 & IT’S SHOWTIME JAPAN countdown-1 on July 18, 2011, in Yamamoto's retirement fight. He won the bout by unanimous decision, after an extra round was fought. Itabashi next fought Masahiro Yamamoto for the vacant It's Showtime World -61 kg title at REBELS.9 & It's Showtime Japan 4 on October 23, 2011. He lost the fight by unanimous decision.

=== Krush ===
Itabashi made his Krush debut against Naoki Ishikawa at Krush 19 on June 8, 2012. He lost the fight by unanimous decision. He rebounded from this loss with a first-round technical knockout of Katsuya Goto at Krush.23 on October 8, 2012.

Itabashi challenged the reigning Krush Super Featherweight champion Hirotaka Urabe at Krush.30 on August 11, 2013. He won the fight by unanimous decision, after an extra round was fought.

Itabashi next fought in two non-title bouts. He first beat Edoardo Tocci by a first-round knockout at Krush.34 on November 10, 2013, which he followed up with a unanimous decision victory against Sho Ogawa at Krush.38 on February 14, 2014.

Itabashi made his first Krush super featherweight title defense against the former AJKF Lightweight champion Haruaki Otsuki at Krush 41 on May 11, 2014. He lost the fight by unanimous decision.

Itabashi faced Tihomir Mitev at REBELS 30 on September 28, 2014, in what was the final professional kickboxing bout of his career. He won his retirement fight by unanimous decision.

== Titles and accomplishments ==
- RISE
  - RISE Super Featherweight championship
    - Two successful title defenses
- Krush
  - Krush Super Featherweight Championship

== Professional kickboxing record ==
Professional kickboxing record
24 wins (5 (T)KOs), 7 losses, 2 draws, 0 no contests
Date	Result	Opponent	Event	Location	Method	Round	Time
2014-09-28	Win	(Bulgaria) Tihomir Mitev	REBELS 30	Tokyo, Japan	Decision (unanimous)	3	3:00
2014-05-11	Loss	(Japan) Haruaki Otsuki	Krush 41	Tokyo, Japan	Decision (unanimous)	3	3:00
Lost the Krush -60kg title.
2014-02-14	Win	(Japan) Sho Ogawa	Krush.38	Tokyo, Japan	Decision (unanimous)	3	3:00
2013-11-10	Win	(Italy) Edoardo Tocci	Krush.34	Tokyo, Japan	KO (3 knockdowns)	1	2:28
2013-08-11	Win	(Japan) Hirotaka Urabe	Krush.30	Tokyo, Japan	Ext.R decision (unanimous)	4	3:00
Wins the Krush -60kg title.
2012-10-08	Win	(Japan) Katsuya Goto	Krush.23	Tokyo, Japan	TKO (punches)	1	1:54
2012-06-08	Loss	(Japan) Naoki Ishikawa	Krush 19	Tokyo, Japan	Decision (unanimous)	3	3:00
2011-10-23	Loss	(Japan) Masahiro Yamamoto	REBELS.9 & It's Showtime Japan 4	Tokyo, Japan	Decision (unanimous)	3	3:00
For the vacant It's Showtime World -61kg title.
2011-07-18	Win	(Japan) Genki Yamamoto	REBELS.8 & IT’S SHOWTIME JAPAN countdown-1	Tokyo, Japan	Ext.R decision (unanimous)	4	3:00
2011-02-27	Loss	(Japan) Kosuke Komiyama	RISE 74	Tokyo, Japan	Decision (split)	5	3:00
Loses the RISE Super Featherweight title.
2010-10-03	Win	(Thailand) Anuwat Kaewsamrit	KGS "RISE 71"	Bunkyō, Tokyo, Japan	Ext.R decision (unanimous)	4	3:00
2010-07-31	Win	(Thailand) Kanongsuk Weerasakreck	RISE 68	Tokyo, Japan	Decision (unanimous)	3	3:00
2010-04-07	Loss	(Japan) Masahiro Yamamoto	RISE 63	Tokyo, Japan	Ext.R decision (unanimous)	4	3:00
2009-11-22	Win	(Japan) Keiji Ozaki	RISE 60	Bunkyo, Tokyo, Japan	KO (punches)	2	2:29
Defends RISE 60kg title.
2009-07-26	Win	(Japan) TURBΦ	RISE 57	Tokyo, Japan	Decision (split)	5	3:00
Defends the RISE Super Featherweight title.
2009-05-31	Win	(Japan) Jun Kaito	RISE 55	Tokyo, Japan	Decision (unanimous)	3	3:00
2009-01-31	Win	(Japan) Yuki	RISE 52	Japan	Decision (unanimous)	5	3:00
Wins the RISE Super Featherweight Title.
2008-11-30	Win	(Japan) Tomoaki Suehiro	RISE 51	Tokyo, Japan	Decision (majority)	3	3:00
2008-08-30	Win	(Japan) Tomoya Miyashita	RISE 49 〜RISING ROOKIES CUP〜	Tokyo, Japan	KO (punches)	3	1:38
2008-05-11	Win	(Japan) Yu Akiyama	RISE 46 〜THE KING OF GLADIATORs '08〜	Tokyo, Japan	Decision (unanimous)	3	3:00
2008-03-30	Win	(Japan) Fire Hiroshi	RISE 44	Tokyo, Japan	Decision (majority)	3	3:00
2008-02-29	Draw	(Japan) Akihiro Kuroda	J-NETWORK "Let's Kick with J 1st"	Tokyo, Japan	Decision (unanimous)	3	3:00
2007-10-28	Win	(Japan) Nagaoka	R.I.S.E. -β- "L7"	Tokyo, Japan	Decision (unanimous)	3	3:00
2007-06-17	Loss	(Japan) Tomoaki Suehiro	R.I.S.E. FLASH to CRUSH TOURNAMENT '07, Semi Final	Tokyo, Japan	TKO (2 knockdowns/knees)	2	1:38
2007-06-17	Win	(Japan) Yusuke Sugawara	R.I.S.E. FLASH to CRUSH TOURNAMENT '07, Quarter Final	Tokyo, Japan	Decision (unanimous)	3	3:00
2007-04-29	Win	(Japan) KAWASAKI	R.I.S.E. XXXV	Tokyo, Japan	Decision (unanimous)	3	3:00
2006-06-25	Loss	(Japan) Tomoaki Suehiro	R.I.S.E. FLASH to CRUSH TOURNAMENT '06, Quarter Final	Tokyo, Japan	TKO (2 knockdowns/right hook)	1	0:46
2006-04-29	Win	(Japan) Ryoma	R.I.S.E. XXV	Tokyo, Japan	Decision (unanimous)	3	3:00
2006-03-26	Win	(Japan) Masaya Takahashi	R.I.S.E. G-BAZOOKA TOURNAMENT '06	Tokyo, Japan	Decision (unanimous)	3	3:00
2005-07-31	Draw	(Japan) Yasuhiro Hamashima	AJKF "Muay Thai Wave from YOKOHAMA 4"	Yokohama, Japan	Decision (unanimous)	3	3:00
2005-06-26	Win	(Japan) Junichi Kato	TRIAL LEAGUE.2	Japan	Decision (unanimous)	3	3:00
2005-04	Win	(Japan) Daisuke Urata		Japan	KO		
2005-03-20	Win	(Japan) Daisuke Urata	TRIAL LEAGUE.1	Japan	Decision (unanimous)	3	3:00
Legend: Win Loss Draw/no contest Notes

== See also ==
- List of male kickboxers
