= Naoki Ishikawa (kickboxer) =

Japanese kickboxer (born 1989)

- Born: 石川直生; April 18, 1979 (age 47); Tokyo, Japan
- Nationality: Japanese
- Height: 177 cm (5 ft 10 in)
- Weight: 60.0 kg (132.3 lb; 9.45 st)
- Stance: Orthodox
- Fighting out of: Japan
- Team: Seishun Juku
- Years active: 1999 - 2015

Kickboxing record
- Total: 67
- Wins: 37
- By knockout: 18
- Losses: 23
- By knockout: 9
- Draws: 7

Naoki Ishikawa (Japanese: 石川直生, Hepburn: Ishikawa Naoki; born April 18, 1989) is a Japanese retired kickboxer, who competed in the super featherweight division of AJKF, where he was the Super Featherweight champion, as well as in the super featherweight and lightweight divisions of Krush.

== Kickboxing career ==
=== AJKF super featherweight champion ===
Ishikawa was booked to face Naoki Maeda for the AJKF Super Featherweight championship at AJKF New Year Kick Festival 2006 on January 4, 2006. He won the fight by a first-round technical knockout. The bout was stopped on the advice of the ringside physician, as Maeda suffered a forehead injury due to an elbow strike.

Ishikawa faced Dedduan Por.Jarunchai in a non-title bout at AJKF SWORD FIGHT 2006 on March 19, 2006. He won the closely contested fight by majority decision. Two judges scored the bout 49–48 in his favor, while the third judge scored it as an even 50–50 draw. Ishikawa next faced Susumu Daiguji, in another non-title bout, at AJKF CROSSOVER on May 14, 2006. He lost the fight by majority decision, with two scorecards of 29–28 and one of 28–28. Ishikawa was knocked down with a right hook in the first round.

Ishikawa made his first AJFK super featherweight title defense against Masami at AJKF Spear of Destiny on July 23, 2006. He won the fight by a first-round technical knockout, after managing to knock Masami down three times by the 2:24 minute mark of the opening round.

Ishikawa faced the MA Japan super featherweight champion Ichiro Otaka at AJKF Seishun Matsuri 〜Naokick's〜 on October 8, 2006. He won the fight by unanimous decision, with scores of 50–46, 50–46 and 50–45. Ishikawa next faced Wanlop Weerasakreck at AJKF New Year Kick Festival 2007 on January 4, 2007. The fight was ruled a draw by majority decision, with one judge scoring the fight 49–48 for Wanlop, while the remaining two judges scored the fight an even 49–49. Ishikawa was booked to face the J-Network lightweight champion Ryuji Kajiwara in a non-title bout at AJKF New Deal on April 15, 2007. The fight was ruled a majority decision draw, with two judges scoring it as a 50–50 and 49–49 draw respectively, while the third judge scored it 50–49 for Kawajiri.

Ishikawa made his first and only Rajadamnern Stadium appearance on June 17, 2007, against Chagnwitnoi Sitchanwit. He won the fight by a third-round technical knockout. Ishikawa was next scheduled to participate in the AJKF lightweight tournament. He faced Takehiro Murahama in the quarterfinal bout, which was held on August 25, 2007. He won the fight by unanimous decision, with scores of 50–48, 50–48 and 50–49. Ishikawa faced Masahiro Yamamoto in the tournament quarterfinals on October 25, 2007. He lost the fight by unanimous decision.

Ishikawa faced Fire Harada at AJKF New Year Kick Festival 2008 on January 4, 2008, in his first fight of the year. He won the fight by a second-round knockout. Ishikawa next faced Shuichi Akabane at AJKF CUB☆KICK'S-9 on February 9, 2008. He won the fight by unanimous decision. Ishikawa was expected to fight again in March 2008, but was later ruled out due to injury. Ishikawa instead made his return to competition at AJKF Spring Storm on April 26, 2008, when he faced the former AJKF featherweight champion Genki Yamamoto. He won the fight by a third-round technical knockout. The fight was stopped at the 2:37 minute mark, due to a cut on Yamamoto's forehead.

Ishikawa was booked to face Kanongsuk Weerasakreck at AJKF Norainu Dengekisakusen on June 22, 2008. Kanongsuk snapped Ishikawa's three fight winning streak, as he won the fight by a fourth-round technical knockout. Ishikawa faced Phetek Sor.Suwanpakdee at AJKF SWORD FIGHT 2008 ～Japan VS Thailand～ on September 19, 2008. He lost the fight by a second-round technical knockout.

Ishikawa made his first Lumpinee Stadium appearance against Tananchai Sor.Bonchai on November 21, 2008. He won the fight by a third-round technical knockout. Ishikawa next faced Suafuanlek Sibiugarden at AJKF NEW Year Kick Festival 2009 on January 4, 2009. He won the fight by a third-round knockout. His two fight winning streak was snapped by Haruaki Otsuki at AJKF Krush 2 on March 14, 2009, who beat him by a third-round knockout. He rebounded from this loss by beating Daisuke Uematsu by a unanimous decision, after an extra round was fought, at AJKF Krush 3 on May 17, 2009.

Ishikawa made his second AJKF super featherweight title defense against Naoki Maeda at AJKF Norainu Dengekisakusen 2009 on June 21, 2009. The pair previously met on January 4, 2006, with Ishikawa winning by a first-round technical knockout. The fight was ruled a majority decision draw, with two judges scoring the fight an even 49–49 draw, while the third judge scored it 49–48 for Ishikawa.

=== Krush ===
Ishikawa made his Krush debut against TURBO at Krush Lightweight Grand Prix 2009 ～Round 2～ on August 14, 2009, in the opening round of the lightweight tournament. Ishikawa faced his quarterfinal opponent Yosuke Mizuochi on the same day, and won the bout by a first-round knockout. He won the fight by a third-round knockout, stopping TURBO with a head kick with 15 seconds left in the bout. Ishikawa faced Yuji Takeuchi in the semifinals of the 2009 Krush Lightweight Grand Prix 2009 on November 2, 2009, in his final fight of the year. He won the bout by a second-round knockout. He wouldn't advance to the tournament semifinal however, as he was forced to withdraw due to a cut above his left eye.

Ishikawa had his five-fight undefeated streak snapped by John Denis at Krush.5 on January 4, 2010, who won beat him by a first-round knockout. Despite this loss, Ishikawa was booked to take part in the K-1 Japan lightweight grand prix. He faced Yuto Watanabe in the first round of the tournament, held on May 2, 2010. Ishikawa won the fight by unanimous decision, with all three judges scoring the fight 30–29 in his favor. Ishikawa advanced to the tournament semifinals, held on July 5, 2010, where he faced Kizaemon Saiga. Saiga won the fight by unanimous decision.

Ishikawa returned to Krush for his final two fights of the year. Ishikawa faced Ryuji Kajiwara at Krush.9 on August 14, 2010. He lost the fight by unanimous decision, with two scores of 29–27 and one of 30–27. Ishikawa was next booked to face Hirotaka Urabe at Krush -60 kg Inaugural Championship Tournament -First Round- on December 12, 2010. Urabe won the fight by unanimous decision.

Ishikawa faced Makoto Morishige at Krush -70 kg inaugural Championship Tournament ~First Round~ on May 29, 2011. He won the fight by a second-round technical knockout. After he successfully rebounded from his three-fight losing streak, Ishikawa was booked to challenge the reigning WBC Muaythai super featherweight champion Yoshinori Nakasuka at NJKF NEW JAPAN BLOOD 7 on July 17, 2011. He lost the fight by unanimous decision, with all three judges scoring the fight 50–46 for Nakasuka. Ishikawa re-matched Yuji Takeuchi at Krush 12 on September 24, 2011. He won the fight by technical decision. The fight was stopped after the second round, due to a cut above Ishikawa's right eye. He was awarded the unanimous decision, with all three judges scoring the bout 18–17 in his favor.

Ishikawa was booked to challenge the reigning Krush Super Featherweight champion Hirotaka Urabe at Krush.15 on January 9, 2012. The fight was ruled a draw by majority decision. After falling short in his first title bid, Ishikawa rebounded with two consecutive victories. He first beat Kan Itabashi by unanimous decision at Krush 19 on June 8, 2012, which he followed up with a unanimous decision win against Shota Saenchaigym at Krush 23 on October 8, 2012. This two fight winning streak earned him the chance to challenge Hirotaka Urabe for the Krush super featherweight title for a second time at Krush.25 ～TEAM DRAGON 10th Anniversary～ on December 14, 2012. The fight was once again ruled a draw, this time by split decision.

Ishikawa fought five more times, following his second failed title bid. He first beat Junpei Aotsu by unanimous decision, after an extra round was fought, at Krush Grand Prix 2013 on January 14, 2013. This was followed by a third-round technical knockout loss to Xavier Bastard at Krush.29 on June 16, 2013, a draw against Shota Kanbe at Krush.33 on September 21, 2013, who would beat him by majority decision at Krush.34 on November 10, 2013. Ishikawa would suffer two more losses in 2014. He first lost to Keisuke Nakamura at Krush.36 on January 4, 2014, who beat him by unanimous decision, while his second loss came against Go Kato at Krush.40 on April 15, 2014.

Ishikawa officially announced his retirement from professional competition on June 25, 2015.

== Titles and accomplishments ==
- All Japan Kickboxing Federation
  - 2006 AJKF Super Featherweight championship
    - Two successful title defenses
- IKUSA
  - 2005 IKUSA Grand Prix -60 kg runner-up

== Professional kickboxing record ==
Professional kickboxing record
37 wins (18 (T)KOs), 23 losses, 7 draws, 0 no contests
Date	Result	Opponent	Event	Location	Method	Round	Time
2014-04-15	Loss	(Japan) Go Kato	Krush.40	Tokyo, Japan	TKO (punches)	1	1:28
2014-01-04	Loss	(Japan) Keisuke Nakamura	Krush.36	Tokyo, Japan	Decision (unanimous)	3	3:00
2013-11-10	Loss	(Japan) Shota Kanbe	Krush.34	Tokyo, Japan	Decision (majority)	3	3:00
2013-09-21	Draw	(Japan) Shota Kanbe	Krush.33	Tokyo, Japan	Technical decision (unanimous)	3	3:00
2013-06-16	Loss	(France) Xavier Bastard	Krush.29	Tokyo, Japan	TKO (referee stoppage)	3	2:48
2013-01-14	Win	(Japan) Junpei Aotsu	Krush Grand Prix 2013	Tokyo, Japan	Ext.R decision (unanimous)	4	3:00
2012-12-14	Draw	(Japan) Hirotaka Urabe	Krush.25 ～TEAM DRAGON 10th Anniversary～	Tokyo, Japan	Decision (split)	3	3:00
For the Krush Super Featherweight Championship.
2012-10-08	Win	(Japan) Shota Saenchaigym	Krush 23	Tokyo, Japan	Decision (unanimous)	3	3:00
2012-06-08	Win	(Japan) Kan Itabashi	Krush 19	Tokyo, Japan	Decision (unanimous)	3	3:00
2012-01-09	Draw	(Japan) Hirotaka Urabe	Krush.15	Tokyo, Japan	Decision (majority)	3	3:00
For the Krush Super Featherweight Championship.
2011-09-24	Win	(Japan) Yuji Takeuchi	Krush 12	Tokyo, Japan	Technical decision (unanimous)	2	3:00
2011-07-17	Loss	(Japan) Yoshinori Nakasuka	NJKF NEW JAPAN BLOOD 7	Tokyo, Japan	Decision (unanimous)	5	3:00
For WBC Muay Thai Japan Super Featherweight title.
2011-05-29	Win	(Japan) Makoto Morishige	Krush -70 kg inaugural Championship Tournament ~First Round~	Tokyo, Japan	TKO (3 knockdowns)	2	2:17
2010-12-12	Loss	(Japan) Hirotaka Urabe	Krush -60 kg Inaugural Championship Tournament -First Round-	Tokyo, Japan	Decision (majority)	3	3:00
2010-08-14	Loss	(Japan) Ryuji Kajiwara	Krush.9	Tokyo, Japan	Decision (unanimous)	3	3:00
2010-07-05	Loss	(Japan) Kizaemon Saiga	K-1 WORLD MAX 2010 –63 kg Japan Tournament FINAL, Quarter Final	Tokyo, Japan	Decision (unanimous)	3	3:00
2010-05-02	Win	(Japan) Yuto Watanabe	K-1 WORLD MAX 2010 –63 kg Japan Tournament 1st Round	Tokyo, Japan	Decision (unanimous)	3	3:00
2010-01-04	Loss	(England) John Denis	Krush.5	Tokyo, Japan	KO (3 knockdowns)	1	2:29
2009-11-02	Win	(Japan) Yuji Takeuchi	Krush Lightweight Grand Prix 2009, Tournament Semifinals	Tokyo, Japan	KO (left high knee)	2	2:27
Ishikawa was forced to withdraw from the tournament due to a cut above his left eye.
2009-08-14	Win	(Japan) Yosuke Mizuochi	Krush Lightweight Grand Prix 2009, Tournament Quarterfinals	Tokyo, Japan	KO (right high kick)	1	3:00
2009-08-14	Win	(Japan) TURBO	Krush Lightweight Grand Prix 2009, Quarterfinals	Tokyo, Japan	KO (right high kick)	3	2:45
2009-06-21	Draw	(Japan) Hisanori Maeda	AJKF Norainu Dengekisakusen 2009	Tokyo, Japan	Decision (majority)	5	3:00
Defends the AJKF Super Featherweight Championship.
2009-05-17	Win	(Japan) Daisuke Uematsu	AJKF Krush 3	Tokyo, Japan	Ext.R decision (unanimous)	4	3:00
2009-03-14	Loss	(Japan) Haruaki Otsuki	AJKF Krush 2	Tokyo, Japan	KO (right hook)	3	2:37
2009-01-04	Win	(Thailand) Suahuanlek Seaviewgarden	AJKF NEW Year Kick Festival 2009	Tokyo, Japan	KO (left high knee)	3	0:59
2008-11-21	Win	(Thailand) Tananchai Sor.Bonchai	Lumpinee Stadium	Bangkok, Thailand	TKO	3	
2008-09-19	Loss	(Thailand) Phetek Sor.Suwanpakdee	AJKF SWORD FIGHT 2008 ～Japan VS Thailand～	Tokyo, Japan	TKO (doctor stoppage)	2	2:59
2008-06-22	Loss	(Thailand) Kanongsuk Weerasakreck	AJKF Norainu Dengekisakusen	Tokyo, Japan	KO (left body kick)	4	2:31
2008-04-26	Win	(Japan) Genki Yamamoto	AJKF Spring Storm	Tokyo, Japan	TKO (doctor stoppage)	3	2:37
2008-02-09	Win	(Japan) Shuichi Akabane	AJKF CUB☆KICK'S-9	Tokyo, Japan	Decision (unanimous)	3	3:00
2008-01-04	Win	(Japan) Fire Harada	AJKF New Year Kick Festival 2008	Tokyo, Japan	KO (right high kick)	2	2:04
2007-10-25	Loss	(Japan) Masahiro Yamamoto	AJKF: The Best of 60 kg Tournament 2007 Final, Semi Finals	Tokyo, Japan	Decision (unanimous)	3	3:00
2007-08-25	Win	(Japan) Takehiro Murahama	AJKF: The Best of 60 kg Tournament 2007, Opening Round	Tokyo, Japan	Decision (unanimous)	3	3:00
2007-06-17	Win	(Thailand) Chagnwitnoi Sitchanwit	Rajadamnern Stadium	Bangkok, Thailand	TKO (punches)	3	
2007-04-15	Draw	(Japan) Ryuji Kajiwara	AJKF New Deal	Tokyo, Japan	Decision (majority)	5	3:00
2007-01-04	Draw	(Thailand) Wanlop Weerasakreck	AJKF New Year Kick Festival 2007	Tokyo, Japan	Decision (majority)	5	3:00
2006-10-08	Win	(Japan) Ichiro Otaka	AJKF Seishun Matsuri 〜Naokick's〜	Tokyo, Japan	Decision (unanimous)	5	3:00
2006-07-23	Win	(Japan) Masami	AJKF Spear of Destiny	Tokyo, Japan	TKO (3 knockdowns)	1	2:24
Defends the AJKF Super Featherweight Championship.
2006-05-14	Loss	(Japan) Susumu Daiguji	AJKF CROSSOVER	Tokyo, Japan	Decision (majority)	3	3:00
2006-03-19	Win	(Thailand) Dedduan Por.Jarunchai	AJKF SWORD FIGHT 2006	Tokyo, Japan	Decision (majority)	5	3:00
2006-01-04	Win	(Japan) Naoki Maeda	AJKF New Year Kick Festival 2006	Tokyo, Japan	TKO (doctor stoppage)	1	3:00
Wins the AJKF Super Featherweight Championship.
2005-11-12	Win	(Japan) Rascal Taka	AJKF Fight Must Go On	Tokyo, Japan	TKO (doctor stoppage)	2	0:57
2005-09-19	Loss	(Japan) Masahiro Yamamoto	IKUSA 2005 –60 kg Grand Prix Final Stage, Final	Tokyo, Japan	TKO (referee stoppage)	3	2:05
For the IKUSA 2005 -60kg/132lb Grand Prix title.
2005-09-19	Win	(Japan) KAWASAKI	IKUSA 2005 –60 kg Grand Prix Final Stage, Semi Final	Tokyo, Japan	Decision (majority)	3	3:00
2005-06-18	Win	(Japan) TURBO	IKUSA 2005 –60 kg Grand Prix Opening Stage, Quarter Final	Tokyo, Japan	TKO (2 knockdowns)	3	1:16
2005-03-18	Win	(United Kingdom) Liam Rackett	AJKF RUSH!	Tokyo, Japan	TKO (doctor stoppage)	1	
2005-01-04	Win	(Japan) Naoki Moriyama	AJKF SURVIVOR	Tokyo, Japan	KO (left straight)	1	1:40
2004-10-17	Loss	(Japan) Masahiro Yamamoto	AJKF: Hard Blow	Tokyo, Japan	Decision (unanimous)	5	3:00
2004-06-18	Win	(Japan) Kenji Takemura	AJKF Japan Lightweight Tournament 2004 FINAL STAGE	Tokyo, Japan	Decision (unanimous)	3	3:00
2004-03-13	Win	(Japan) Akito Iwasa	AJKF Japan Lightweight Tournament 2004 First STAGE	Tokyo, Japan	Decision (unanimous)	3	3:00
2003-09-27	Loss	(Japan) Genki Yamamoto	AJKF KNOCK DOWN	Tokyo, Japan	TKO (3 knockdowns)	2	2:12
2003-05-23	Win	(Japan) Yoshikazu Murayama	AJKF All Japan Lightweight Tournament 〜Finals〜	Tokyo, Japan	TKO (doctor stoppage)	2	2:55
2003-02-07	Win	(Japan) Atsushi Oda	AJKF RED ZONE	Tokyo, Japan	Decision (unanimous)	3	3:00
2002-11-17	Win	(Japan) Rascal Taka	AJKF BACK FROM HELL-I	Tokyo, Japan	Decision (unanimous)	3	3:00
2002-09-06	Win	(Japan) Hisanori Maeda	AJKF GOLDEN TRIGGER, All Japan Super Featherweight Tournament Semi Final	Tokyo, Japan	TKO (punches)	3	2:54
2001-12-09	Win	(Japan) Masaaki Shintaku	AJKF BULLET	Tokyo, Japan	Decision (unanimous)	3	3:00
2001-07-22	Win	(Japan) Genki Yamamoto	AJKF BLAZE UP	Tokyo, Japan	Decision (unanimous)	3	3:00
2001-03-16	Win	(Korea) Kang Hyun Kyung	AJKF CROSS FIRE-I	Tokyo, Japan	Decision (unanimous)	3	3:00
2000-09-13	Draw	(Japan) Genki Yamamoto	AJKF LEGEND-VIII	Tokyo, Japan	Decision (unanimous)	3	3:00
2000-06-20	Loss	(Japan) Naoyuki Sugiue	AJKF LEGEND-VI	Tokyo, Japan	KO	1	0:52
2000-04-27	Loss	(Japan) Yuuho Kohisa	AJKF LEGEND-IV	Tokyo, Japan	Decision (unanimous)	3	3:00
2000-02-20	Loss	(Japan) Daisuke Kasahara	AJKF LEGEND-II	Tokyo, Japan	Decision (unanimous)	3	3:00
2000-01-21	Win	(Japan) Tomoyuki Morishita	AJKF LEGEND-I	Tokyo, Japan	KO	3	1:15
1999-01-24	Win	(Japan) Hideaki Takama	NJKF	Tokyo, Japan	Decision (unanimous)	3	3:00
Legend: Win Loss Draw/no contest Notes

== See also ==
- List of male kickboxers
