= Yuji Takeuchi =

Japanese kickboxer

- Born: 竹内裕二; August 13, 1983 (age 43); Chiba prefecture, Japan
- Other names: Kyoken
- Nationality: Japanese
- Height: 170 cm (5 ft 7 in)
- Weight: 60 kg (130 lb; 9.4 st)
- Style: Kickboxing
- Stance: Orthodox
- Fighting out of: Japan
- Team: Sugehara Dojo

Kickboxing record
- Total: 44
- Wins: 27
- By knockout: 13
- Losses: 14
- Draws: 2
- No contests: 1

Other information
- Boxing record from BoxRec

"Kyoken" Yuji Takeuchi (born August 13, 1983) is a Japanese former professional kickboxer.

== Biography ==
Takeuchi started combat sports with boxing and later transitioned to kickboxing after seeing the success of K-1 events.

== Titles and accomplishments ==
- Martial Arts Japan Kickboxing Federation
  - 2007 MAJKF Super Featherweight Champion
  - 2008 WMAF Super Featherweight Champion
- Krush
  - 2011 krush inaugural Championship Tournament -60 kg Runner-up

== Kickboxing record ==
Professional Kickboxing Record
28 Wins (14 (T)KO's), 14 Losses, 2 Draws, 1 No Contest
Date	Result	Opponent	Event	Location	Method	Round	Time
2024-09-28	Loss	(Japan) Hiroki	Krush.165	Tokyo, Japan	TKO (Referee stoppage)	3	0:40
2022-04-03	Win	(Japan) Satoru Nariai	K-1: K'Festa 5	Tokyo, Japan	KO (Right cross)	2	2:29
2016-09-19	Loss	(Japan) Kenta Hayashi	K-1 World GP 2016 Super Featherweight World Tournament	Tokyo, Japan	KO (3 Knockdowns/Left Hook)	1	2:47
2013-09-21	Loss	(Brazil) Minoru Kimura	Krush 33	Japan	KO (Straight Right+Left Hook)	1	2:07
2013-06-30	Loss	(Thailand) Kanongsuk Weerasakreck	MAJKF DRAGON ROAD ～ONE AND ONLY TAKE 2～	Japan	TKO	3	2:05
2013-05-03	Loss	(Japan) Tatsuya Inaishi	Road to Glory Japan	Japan	Decision (Split)	3	3:00
2013-03-20	Win	(Japan) Shota Hayashi	Krush 27	Tokyo, Japan	KO (Punches)	1	1:48
2013-01-13	NC	(Japan) Hirotaka Miyakawa	Krush Grand Prix 2013	Tokyo, Japan	Doctor stoppage (low blow)		
2012-12-02	Loss	(Japan) SHIGERU	Bigbang 11	Tokyo, Japan	Decision (Unanimous)	3	3:00
2012-10-08	Win	(Japan) Fumiya Osawa	Krush 23	Tokyo, Japan	KO (Left Hook)	3	1:35
2012-07-29	Win	(Thailand) Sendit Sasiprapa	MAJKF	Japan	Ext.R Decision (Mjoarity)	4	3:00
2011-09-24	Loss	(Japan) Naoki Ishikawa	Krush 12	Tokyo, Japan	Decision (unanimous)	3	3:00
2011-04-30	Loss	(Japan) Hirotaka Urabe	Krush -60 kg Inaugural Championship Tournament -Triple Final Round-	Tokyo, Japan	KO (High kick)	1	1:28
For the inaugural Krush 60kg title.
2011-04-30	Win	(Japan) Masaaki Noiri	Krush First Generation King Tournament ~Triple Final Round~, Semi Finals	Tokyo, Japan	KO (left hook)	3	1:51
2010-12-12	Win	(Japan) Yosuke Mizuochi	Krush Inaugural Championship Tournament ～Round.1～	Tokyo, Japan	KO (3 Knockdowns/Left Hook)	2	2:24
2010-07-05	Loss	(Japan) Koya Urabe	K-1 WORLD MAX 2010 – 63 kg Japan Tournament Reserve Fight	Japan	Decision (Unanimous)	3	3:00
2010-05-02	Loss	(Japan) Yuki	K-1 World MAX 2010 –63 kg Japan Tournament, 1st round	Japan	KO (High Kick)	2	1:53
2010-03-28	Loss	(Thailand) Chudern Chuwattana	MAJKF - Taniyama Gym 25th Anniversary - Bigbang	Tokyo, Japan	Decision (Unanimous)	5	3:00
2009-11-02	Loss	(Japan) Naoki Ishikawa	Krush Lightweight Grand Prix 2009 ～Final Round～	Tokyo, Japan	KO (Left High Knee)	2	2:27
2009-09-06	Win	(Thailand) Mekorlek Sor.Kingstar	MAJKF Tekken in Kimitsu	Kimitsu, Japan	KO	3	0:40
2009-07-24	Win	(Japan) Ryuji Kajiwara	Krush Lightweight Grand Prix 2009, Quarter Final	Tokyo, Japan	Decision (Unanimous)	3	3:00
2009-07-24	Win	(Japan) Ichiro Ootaka	Krush Lightweight Grand Prix 2009 〜Round.1〜	Tokyo, Japan	KO (Right Hook)	2	2:08
2009-06-14	Win	(Japan) Takahito Fujimaki	MAJKF - BREAK THROUGH-11	Tokyo, Japan	Decision (Unanimous)	3	3:00
2009-05-17	Win	(Japan) Masahiro Yamamoto	Krush.3	Tokyo, Japan	KO (left hook)	2	1:38
2009-03-22	Draw	(Japan) Rashata	NJKF GO FOR BROKE 〜ROAD TO REAL KING III〜	Tokyo, Japan	Decision	5	3:00
2008-12-21	Win	(Japan) TURBΦ	MAJKF - BREAK THROUGH 8	Tokyo, Japan	Decision (Majority)	5	3:00
Wins WMAF Super Featherweight title.
2008-11-24	Win	(Thailand) Yokthai Sithoar	MAJKF - Tekken 6	Tokyo, Japan	Decision (Unanimous)	5	3:00
2008-09-21	Win	(Thailand) Maki Dentoranee	MAJKF - BREAK THROUGH 6	Tokyo, Japan	Ext.R Decision (Unanimous)	4	3:00
2008-07-04	Loss	(Japan) Yuki	RISE 48 THE KING OF GLADIATORs’08	Japan	Ext.R TKO (Low Kick)	4	1:15
For the RISE Lightweight Title.
2008-06-15	Win	(Thailand) Pinphet Sor.Torsapon	MAJKF - BREAK THROUGH-4	Tokyo, Japan	Decision (Unanimous)	3	3:00
2008-05-11	Win	(Japan) Tomoaki Suehiro	R.I.S.E. 46 〜THE KING OF GLADIATORs '08〜	Tokyo, Japan	KO (Right Cross)	2	2:25
2008-04-13	Win	(Japan) Hideki Soga	Shin Nihon Kickboxing Association - Superkick	Tokyo, Japan	TKO (Punches)	3	2:58
2007-12-02	Win	(Japan) Atom Yamada	MAJKF - BREAKDOWN-8 MA.KICK Matsuri CHAMPION CARNIVAL	Tokyo, Japan	TKO (Doctor Stoppage)	4	1:03
Wins MAJKF Super Featherweight Title.
2007-11-11	Win	(Japan) Hideo Sugazaki	MAJKF - Tekken 5	Tokyo, Japan	KO (Punches)	3	1:52
2007-10-21	Win	(Japan) TSUYOSHI	MAJKF - BREAKDOWN-7	Tokyo, Japan	KO (Punches)	2	2:48
2007-09-30	Win	(Japan) Hidekazu Tanaka	MAJKF - ADVANCE.1	Chiba, Japan	KO (Punches)	3	
2007-04-06	Win	(Japan) Kenryu	MAJKF - BREAKDOWN-3	Tokyo, Japan	KO	1	1:45
2006-12-03	Win	(Japan) Toshiharu Haga	MAJKF - SURPRISING 8	Tokyo, Japan	Decision (Unanimous)	3	3:00
2006-10-22	Draw	(Japan) HANAWA	MAJKF - SURPRISING 7th	Tokyo, Japan	Decision	3	
2004-11-21	Win	(Japan) Kazuki Kondo	MA Nihon Kick - SUPREME-7 CHAMPION CARNIVAL	Tokyo, Japan	Decision	3	2:00
2004-10-10	Loss	(Japan) KING	MAJKF -ADVANCE-1	Tokyo, Japan	Decision (Unanimous)	3	3:00
2004-07-11	Win	(Japan) Watanabe	Shinsengumi	Japan			
2004-06-06	Win	(Japan) Takuya Ito	MAJKF - SUPREME-4	Tokyo, Japan	KO	3	
Legend: Win Loss Draw/No contest Notes
