= Arashi Fujihara =

Japanese kickboxer

- Born: December 22, 1978 (age 47); Wakayama prefecture, Japan
- Native name: 藤原あらし
- Nationality: Japanese
- Height: 1.64 m (5 ft 4 1/2 in)
- Weight: 53 kg (117 lb; 8.3 st)
- Division: Flyweight
- Style: Muay Thai
- Stance: Southpaw
- Fighting out of: Tokyo, Japan
- Team: Bungeling Bay Spirit
- Years active: 2002 - present

Kickboxing record
- Total: 87
- Wins: 60
- By knockout: 37
- Losses: 19
- Draws: 8

Arashi Fujihara (藤原 あらし, Fujihara Arashi) is a Japanese kickboxer and Muay Thai fighter.

== Martial arts career ==
He defeated Noboru Yamamoto by TKO during WBC Muay Thai The Path to the World Champion to capture the WBC Muaythai World Bantamweight champion.

Fujihara first fought Nattaphon Nacheukvittayakom for the Lumpinee Stadium 122 lbs title. He lost the fight by decision. Arashi then fought Kengkla Por.Pekko for the Lumpinee Stadium 115 lbs title in April 2015, but lost the fight by unanimous decision.

In July 2016, Fujihara fought Shuto Hagiwara for the Lumpine Stadium Japan Bantamweight title. He won the fight by unanimous decision. His first title defense was against Yuta Sasaki, but lost the title by unanimous decision.

Fujihara was scheduled to fight Raiden during Kickboxing ZONE 6 “The Vengeance” for the All Japan Super Bantamweight title. He defeated Fujihara by a fourth round TKO.

== Championships and accomplishments ==
- All Japan Kickboxing Federation
  - 2004 AJKF Bantamweight Champion
  - 2017 All Japan Super Bantamweight Champion
- J-NETWORK
  - 2005 J-NETWORK Mach 55 1st Tournament winner
- World Professional Muaythai Federation
  - 2009 WPMF World Super Bantamweight Champion
- World Boxing Council Muaythai
  - 2010 WBC Muay Thai World Bantamweight Champion
- Lumpinee Stadium of Japan
  - 2016 LPNJ Bantamweight Champion

Awards

- eFight.jp
  - Fighter of the Month (May 2014)

== Fight record ==
Professional kickboxing & Muay Thai record
60 wins (37 (T)KOs), 21 losses, 10 draws, 0 no contests
Date	Result	Opponent	Event	Location	Method	Round	Time
2022-05-28	Draw	(Japan) Reiya JSK	NO KICK NO LIFE	Tokyo, Japan	Decision (unanimous)	3	3:00
2022-01-09	Loss	(Japan) HIROYUKI	NO KICK NO LIFE	Tokyo, Japan	TKO (towel thrown/flying Knee)	3	2:23
2021-06-06	Draw	(Japan) Masa Bravely	KROSSxOVER 12	Tokyo, Japan	Decision	5	3:00
2021-03-07	Loss	(Japan) Syuto Sato	KROSSxOVER 11	Tokyo, Japan	Ext.R decision (split)	4	3:00
2020-12-20	Win	(Japan) Yu Wor.Wanchai	KROSSxOVER 10	Tokyo, Japan	Decision (unanimous)	5	3:00
2020-10-25	Win	(Japan) Keisuke Miyasaka	KROSSxOVER 9	Tokyo, Japan	TKO (doctor stoppage)	2	2:08
2020-02-25	Win	(Japan) Takaya Yamaguchi	KROSSxOVER 8	Tokyo, Japan	TKO (middle kicks)	2	1:41
2019-01-13	Win	(Japan) Taiga Nakayama	Norainu Matsuri 4 Chototsumoushin DE Fuyu no Jin	Tokyo, Japan	Decision (split)	5	3:00
2018-08-25	Loss	(Japan) Koki Yamada	Norainu Matsuri 3	Tokyo, Japan	Decision (split)	5	3:00
2018-05-25	Loss	(Thailand) Daosayam Nor.Naksin	Kick Addict	Tokyo, Japan	Decision (unanimous)	5	3:00
2018-03-31	Win	(Thailand) Ponchan OZgym	Norainu Matsuri 2	Tokyo, Japan	Decision (unanimous)	5	3:00
2017-10-21	Win	(Thailand) Singdam OZgym	Norainu Matsuri	Tokyo, Japan	KO (left body kick)	5	1:31
2017-05-21	Win	(Japan) Raiden	Kickboxing ZONE 6 “The Vengeance”	Tokyo, Japan	TKO (corner stoppage)	4	3:00
Wins the All Japan Super Bantamweight title
2017-04-02	Win	(Thailand) Rachasi Nor.Naksin	Muay Thai Open 38	Tokyo, Japan	TKO	3	
2016-12-25	Loss	(Japan) Yuta Sasaki	Muay Thai Open 37	Tokyo, Japan	Decision (unanimous)	5	3:00
Lost the Lumpine Stadium Japan Super Lightweight title
2016-11-15	Win	(Thailand) Karchanawisaklek	ZONE extra	Tokyo, Japan	TKO	2	
2016-10-02	Win	(Thailand) Gaipa 13RienExpress	Muay Thai Open 36	Tokyo, Japan	KO (left elbow)	1	1:23
2016-09-11	Win	(Japan) Chen Yuxi	Kickboxing ZONE 5	Kadena, Okinawa, Japan	TKO	3	1:31
2016-07-17	Win	(Japan) Shuto Hagiwara	Muay Thai Open 35	Tokyo, Japan	Decision (unanimous)	3	3:00
Wins the Lumpine Stadium Japan Bantamweight title
2016-05-01	Win	(Korea) Kim Tong Saeng	Kickboxing ZONE 4	Yokohama, Japan	TKO (3 lnockdowns)	2	2:55
2016-03-27	Win	(Japan) Tatsushi Wakayama	K-SPIRIT 13	Okinawa, Japan	TKO (towel thrown)	4	1:59
2016-02-07	Loss	(Japan) Satoshi Katashima	Muay Thai Open 34	Tokyo, Japan	Decision (unanimous)	5	3:00
2015-12-13	Loss	(Japan) Eisaku Ogasawara	Muay Thai Open 33	Tokyo, Japan	KO (left hook)	1	1:34
2015-10-24	Win	(Australia) Brodie Stalder	Lumpinee Stadium	Bangkok, Thailand	Decision	5	3:00
2015-09-13	Win	(Japan) SIDEN	Kickboxing ZONE 3	Kadena, Okinawa, Japan	TKO (body kick and knee)	2	1:29
2015-08-22	Win	(Thailand) Malongchai Aor.Boonchuai	Lumpinee Kirkkrai, Lumpinee Stadium	Bangkok, Thailand	TKO	2	
2015-05-25	Win	(Italy) Carlo Pappadà	Kickboxing ZONE 3	Yokohama, Japan	TKO (low kicks)	4	2:06
2015-04-05	Loss	(Thailand) Kengkla Por.Pekko	Shuken 25	Tokyo, Japan	Decision (unanimous)	5	3:00
For the Lumpinee Stadium 115 lbs title
2015-01-31	Win	(Thailand) Nongta Chaikiakorwee	Shuken 24	Tokyo, Japan	Decision (unanimous)	5	3:00
2014-11-09	Win	(Japan) Setsu Iguchi	Kickboxing ZONE	Yokohama, Japan	KO (punches)	2	0:33
2014-10-12	Loss	(Thailand) Nattaphon Nacheukvittayakom	Shuken 22	Tokyo, Japan	Decision (unanimous)	5	3:00
For the Lumpinee Stadium 122 lbs title
2014-09-07	Win	(Thailand) Pinponpan	TNT 5th	Yokohama, Japan	Decision (unanimous)	3	3:00
2014-05-18	Win	(Thailand) Kongputon Nornoppuhiran	Shuken 18	Tokyo, Japan	Decision (majority)	5	3:00
2014-02-01	Win	(Thailand) Kamchak Kao	M-FIGHT Shuken 15 Part.2	Tokyo, Japan	KO (middle kick & punch)	1	1:21
2013-01-06	Win	(Thailand) Pepnoi Palisha	RISE 91/M-1MC ～INFINITY.II～	Tokyo, Japan	KO	1	2:22
2012-09-15	Draw	(Thailand) Ekkarat	SNKA TITANS NEOS 12	Tokyo, Japan	Decision	3	3:00
2012-07-22	Loss	(Japan) Mutsuki Ebata	SNKA MAGNUM 29	Tokyo, Japan	TKO (3 knockdowns)	1	2:36
2012-03-25	Loss	(Thailand) Choknamchai Sitjakung	M-1 Muay Thai Challenge Sutt Yod Muaythai vol.1	Japan	Decision (majority)	5	3:00
2012-01-22	Loss	(Thailand) Pornmongkong K.T.Gym	REBELS 10	Tokyo, Japan	Decision (unanimous)	5	3:00
2011-12-04	Win	(Japan) Rintaro Kawai	FIGHT CLUB 1	Japan	KO	1	2:17
2011-07-18	Win	(Japan) Toma	REBELS.8 & IT’S SHOWTIME JAPAN countdown-1～	Japan	Decision (majority)	5	3:00
2011-06-12	Win	(Thailand) Kantinpong Torpitagonrakan	M-1 Muay Thai Challenge RAORAK MUAY vol.2	Japan	KO	5	2:59
2011-04-17	Win	(Japan) Shigeyoshi Ikeda	SNKA TITANS NEOS IX	Tokyo, Japan	TKO	4	2:45
2011-04-10	Win	(Thailand) Naronchai DragonTailGym	M-1 Muay Thai Challenge RAORAK MUAY vol.1	Japan	KO	3	0:42
2010-12-30	Win	(Japan) Mutsuki Ebata	World Victory Road Presents: Soul of Fight	Tokyo, Japan	Decision (unanimous)	5	3:00
2010-12-01	Loss	(Thailand) Kuwanpichit 13CoinExpress	Fujiwara Matsuri 2010	Tokyo, Japan	Decision (unanimous)	5	3:00
2010-11-03	Win	(Japan) Noboru Yamamoto	Gekitou III	Japan	KO	2	1:47
2010-09-26	Win	(Japan) Noboru Yamamoto	WBC Muay Thai The Path to the World Champion	Japan	TKO	4	1:17
Wins the WBC Muay Thai World Bantamweight title
2010-07-19	Win	(Japan) Tomonori	REBELS.3	Tokyo, Japan	KO	3	1:18
2010-06-06	Win	(Thailand) Sayannoi Lukfuatanong	M-1 RAJA BOXING SINGHA BEER Muay Thai Challenge NAI KANOMTOM vol.2	Tokyo, Japan	Decision (unanimous)	4	3:00
2010-01-23	Loss	(Thailand) Norasing Kiatprasaenchai	REBELS	Tokyo, Japan	Decision (majority)	5	3:00
2010-06-06	Draw	(Thailand) Denchai SIt.Or	M-1 FAIRTEX SINGHA BEER Muay Thai Challenge 2009 Yod Nak Suu vol.4	Japan	Decision	5	3:00
2009-09-13	Win	(Thailand) Wanlop Weerasakreck	M-1 FAIRTEX SINGHA BEER Muay Thai Challenge 2009 Yod Nak Suu vol.3	Japan	Decision (majority)	5	3:00
Wins the WPMF World Super Bantamweight title
2009-06-21	Loss	(Thailand) Pinsiam Sor.Amnuaysirichoke	AJKF Norainu Dengekisakusen 2009	Tokyo, Japan	KO	3	1:30
2009-03-01	Draw	(Thailand) Apilak K.T.Gym	M-1 FAIRTEX Muay Thai Challenge 2009 Yod Nak Suu vol.1	Japan	Decision	5	3:00
2009-01-18	Draw	(Thailand) Yokmorakot Petchfocus	Muay Lok Japan 2009 Saidai Saikyou no Muay Thai Matsuri	Japan	Decision (majority)	5	3:00
For the WPMF World Bantamweight title
2008-11-09	Win	(Thailand) Tepparat Weerasakreck	M-1 FAIRTEX Muay Thai Challenge Legend of elbows 2008～JAO SUU～	Japan	KO	3	1:10
2008-09-19	Loss	(Thailand) Chatpichit Tor.Bonchai	AJKF SWORD FIGHT 2008 ～Japan vs Thailand～	Tokyo, Japan	Decision (majority)	3	1:30
2008-06-08	Loss	(Thailand) Komsan Petbontong	M-1 FAIRTEX Legend of elbows 2008 ～MIND～	Japan	TKO	3	2:43
2008-04-26	Win	(Thailand) Lomlan Or.Penjamar	AJKF Spring Storm	Japan	KO	2	0:42
2007-12-17	Draw	(Japan) Naoki Maeda	AJKF Fujiwara Masturi 2007	Japan	Decision	5	3:00
2007-10-25	Win	(Thailand) Wanlop Weerasakreck	AJKF Kick Return/Kickboxer of the best 60 Tournament ～Final Round～	Tokyo, Japan	Decision (unanimous)	5	3:00
2007-08-25	Win	(Japan) Nobuchika Terado	AJKF Kick Return/Kickboxer of the best 60 Tournament ～First Round～	Tokyo, Japan	TKO	4	2:06
Defends the AJKF Bantamweight title
2007-06-17	Win	(Thailand) Lukkaew Kiatotorborubon	AJKF Rajadamnern Stadium	Bangkok, Thailand	TKO (punches)	4	2:22
2007-04-15	Loss	(Thailand) Kompayak Weerasakreck	AJKF New Deal	Tokyo, Japan	KO	3	2:19
2007-03-09	Draw	(Japan) Masahiro Yamamoto	AJKF	Tokyo, Japan	Decision (majority)	5	3:00
2006-11-23	Loss	(Japan) Takashi Yoneda	NJKF ADVANCE X ～Zenshin～, -55 kg Tournament Final	Tokyo, Japan	KO (high knee)	5	1:26
2006-09-24	Win	(Japan) Kunitaka	NJKF ADVANCE VIII ～Zenshin～, -55 kg Tournament Semi Final	Tokyo, Japan	Decision (unanimous)	5	3:00
2006-07-22	Win	(Japan) Yuji Iwanami	NJKF ADVANCE VII ～Zenshin～, -55 kg Tournament Quarter Final	Tokyo, Japan	KO	4	2:08
2006-06-11	Win	(Korea) Choi Jin Sun	AJKF Triumph	Tokyo, Japan	Decision (unanimous)	3	3:00
2006-04-21	Win	(Thailand) Rajasaklek Sor.Vorapin	AJKF Inaugural Welterweight Championship Tournament	Tokyo, Japan	KO	3	1:50
2005-10-16	Loss	(Thailand) Wanlop Weerasakreck	AJKF Sword Fight	Tokyo, Japan	KO	2	0:20
2005-07-31	Win	(Japan) Shinji	J-NETWORK GO! GO! J-NET ’05 ～MACH 55 1st Final～	Tokyo, Japan	Decision (unanimous)	5	3:00
2005-05-06	Win	(Japan) Kunitaka Fujiwara	J-NETWORK GO! GO! J-NET ’05 ～MACH 55 1st Semi Final～	Tokyo, Japan	TKO	3	1:47
2005-03-02	Win	(Japan) Kenji Seki	J-NETWORK GO! GO! J-NET ’05 ～MACH 55 1st Quarter Final～	Tokyo, Japan	KO	3	2:45
2004-11-19	Win	(Japan) Kazuhiko Shingo	AJKF The Championship	Tokyo, Japan	KO (low kicks)	1	2:42
Wins the AJKF Bantamweight title
2004-08-22	Draw	(Thailand) Dausawin Kitaratapong	AJKF Super Fight Lightning	Tokyo, Japan	Decision	5	3:00
2004-06-18	Win	(Japan) Naoki Tsuji	AJKF Japan Lightweight Tournament 2004 FINAL STAGE	Tokyo, Japan	Decision (unanimous)	3	3:00
2004-04-24	Draw	(United Kingdom) Damien Trainor	Pain and Glory	England	Decision	5	3:00
2004-06-18	Win	(Korea) Kim Yu Dong	AJKF Japan Lightweight Tournament 2004 FINAL STAGE	Tokyo, Japan	KO	3	0:48
2004-01-04	Win	(Japan) Miki Urabayashi	AJKF Wilderness	Tokyo, Japan	Decision (majority)	3	0:48
2003-08-17	Loss	(Japan) Noriyuki Hiratani	AJKF Hurricane Blow	Tokyo, Japan	Decision (unanimous)	5	3:00
For the AJKF Bantamweight title
2003-06-20	Win	(Japan) Yutaka	AJKF Dead Heat	Tokyo, Japan	KO	3	1:36
2003-03-08	Win	(Japan) Rabbit Seki	AJKF	Tokyo, Japan	KO (punches)	4	0:57
2002-12-08	Win	(Japan) Yuzo Maki	AJKF BACK FROM HELL-II	Tokyo, Japan	KO	2	2:48
2002-10-17	Win	(Japan) Noriyuki Hiratani	AJKF Brand New Fight	Tokyo, Japan	Ext.R decision (majority)	4	3:00
2002-09-06	Win	(Japan) Takashi Kuroda	AJKF Golden Trigger	Tokyo, Japan	KO	2	1:49
2002-07-12	Draw	(Japan) Takashi Kuroda	J-NETWORK J-BLOODS III	Tokyo, Japan	Decision (unanimous)	3	3:00
2002-04-12	Win	(Japan) Yosuke Nakagomi	AJKF Rising Force	Tokyo, Japan	Decision (unanimous)	3	3:00
2002-03-17	Win	(Japan) Kazuo Ohashi	AJKF OVER the EDGE	Tokyo, Japan	KO	3	2:01
2002-01-04	Win	(Japan) Yasuhito Sate	AJKF KICK MIND	Tokyo, Japan	KO	2	2:12
Legend: Win Loss Draw/no contest Notes

== Lethwei record ==
Lethwei record
0 wins, 0 losses, 1 draw
Date	Result	Opponent	Event	Location	Method	Round	Time
2013-09-21	Draw	(Myanmar) Nyan Linn Aung	Win Sein Taw Ya 2020	Mudon Township, Myanmar	Draw	5	3:00
Legend: Win Loss Draw/no contest Notes

== See also ==
- List of male kickboxers
