= Mutsuki Ebata =

Japanese kickboxer

- Born: 江幡 睦 January 10, 1991 (age 35); Tsuchiura, Japan
- Nationality: Japanese
- Height: 165 cm (5 ft 5 in)
- Weight: 55.0 kg (121.3 lb; 8.66 st)
- Division: Flyweight
- Style: Kickboxing; Kyokushin Karate
- Stance: Orthodox
- Fighting out of: Tokyo, Japan
- Team: Kickboxing Ihara Gym
- Years active: 2007–present

Kickboxing record
- Total: 50
- Wins: 39
- By knockout: 27
- Losses: 8
- By knockout: 0
- Draws: 3

Other information
- Notable relatives: Rui Ebata (Twin brother)

Mutsuki Ebata (Japanese: 江幡 睦, Ebata Mutsuki; born January 10, 1991) is a Japanese kickboxer, currently competing in the bantamweight division of RISE and SNKA.

As of October 2022, he is ranked as the ninth best flyweight (under 56.7 kg) kickboxer in the world by Combat Press and the fifth best super flyweight (under 55 kg) by Beyond Kick.

== Martial arts career ==
Ebata made his professional debut against Masamitsu Ibara at SNKA TITANS NEOS 2 on September 16, 2007. He won the fight by a first-round knockout. After winning a decision over Yuki Ueba at SNKA MAGNUM 16 on March 9, 2008, Ebata fought to a majority decision draw against Daihachi Furuoka at SNKA MAGNUM 17 on July 13, 2008. Ebata next faced Hiroki Akimoto at K-1 Koshien -KING OF UNDER 18- on August 29, 2008. He suffered his first professional loss, as Akimoto won the fight by unanimous decision.

Ebata faced Tatsuya Nanase at SNKA MAGNUM 19 on March 8, 2009. He won the fight by unanimous decision. Ebata returned to the ring a month later, as he faced Haruya Ohama at SNKA Superkick on April 5, 2009. He won the fight by a second-round knockout. Ebata notched another quick stoppage victory in his next fight, as he needed just 26 seconds to knock Lukton out at SNKA MAGNUM 20 on July 12, 2009. Ebata was booked to face Atom Tataki, in his fourth and final fight of the year, at SNKA MAGNUM 21 on October 25, 2009. He won the fight by unanimous decision, with all three judges scoring the bout 30–26 in his favor.

Mutuski was scheduled to fight Manasak Pinsinchai for the Rajadamnern Stadium Bantamweight title, during SNKA MAGNUM 31. He lost the fight by unanimous decision. After defeating Ektawan Kulunteptonburi by TKO in his next fight, he once against fought for the Rajadamnern Stadium Bantamweight belt, this time against Fonpet Chuwattana. Ebata lost the fight by a split decision. He bounced back from his second failed title bid with a TKO win over Wanchai Sitsaitong.

Ebata fought Chanaek Sor.Mantanasanchai for the inaugural WKBA World Bantamweight title during SNKA TITANS NEOS 15. He won the fight by TKO, after Chanaek's corner threw in the towel midway through the first round.

He won his next two fights, winning a unanimous decision against Fonpet Chuwattana, and knocking out Chansaknoi Sakrunruang during SNKA Soul in the Ring XII.

Mutsuki Ebata was scheduled to fight Fonpet Chuwattana. The fight was a title defense for both, as Ebata defended the WKBA World Bantamweight and Chuwattana defended the Rajadamnern Stadium Bantamweight. Chuwattana won the fight, and both of the titles, by unanimous decision.

Ebata fought Mongkonchai Sor.Mirjan for the vacant WKBA World Bantamweight title during SNKA TITANS NEOS XVIII. He beat Mirjan by a second round KO, to capture the WKBA title for the second time.

Ebata afterwards went on a six fight winning streak, defeating Luktao Mor.Tamachat, Kaoniew Sitpuyainirun, Krunsin PetpumMuaythai and Anuchit Tamswamuaythaigym by TKO, as well as scoring a decision win over Hontonglek Chor Fanpuriansee and a split decision against Fonpet Chuwattana.

He was scheduled to defend his WKBA World Bantamweight title for the first time against Mafuenglek Chor.Nor.Patalun during SNKA TITANS NEOS 22. Ebata won the fight by a second round TKO.

After successfully defending his WKBA title, Ebata went on a 5-1-1 run. He defeated Toto PetpumMuaythai by a first round KO, Ninmongkon PetpumMuaythai by a first round TKO, KO wins over Ali Lo Petbontong and Gun Harbataijon, as well as a decision win against Petyaso Dabrunasakarm.

During SNKA MAGNUM 51, Ebata challenged Saotho Sitchefboontham for the Rajadamnern Stadium Bantamweight title. He fight was declared a draw.

He was scheduled to fight Rasta during Rizin 24, for his Rizin debut. Ebata won the fight by unanimous decision.

Ebata was scheduled to fight Kazane in the quarterfinals of the 2021 RISE Dead or Alive 53 kg Tournament. He lost the fight by split decision.

== Titles and accomplishments ==
- Shin Nihon Kickboxing Association
  - 2010 SNKA Flyweight Champion (one title defense)
- World Kickboxing Association
  - 2014 WKBA World Bantamweight Champion
  - 2015 WKBA World Bantamweight Champion (one title defense)

== Fight record ==
Kickboxing record
39 wins (27 (T)KOs), 8 losses, 3 draws
Date	Result	Opponent	Event	Location	Method	Round	Time
2022-06-19	Win	(Japan) Riamu	THE MATCH 2022	Tokyo, Japan	Ext.R decision (split)	4	3:00
2022-04-02	Loss	(Japan) Masahiko Suzuki	RISE El Dorado 2022	Tokyo, Japan	Decision (unanimous)	3	3:00
2021-07-18	Loss	(Japan) Kazane	RISE WORLD SERIES 2021 - Dead or Alive Tournament, Quarter Final	Osaka, Japan	Ext.R decision (split)	4	3:00
2020-09-27	Win	(Japan) Rasta	Rizin 24 - Saitama	Saitama, Japan	Decision (unanimous)	3	3:00
2019-10-20	Draw	(Thailand) Saotho Sitchefboontham	SNKA MAGNUM 51	Tokyo, Japan	Decision	5	3:00
For the Rajadamnern Stadium Bantamweight title.
2019-07-07	Win	(Thailand) Gun Harbataijon	SNKA TITANS NEOS 25	Tokyo, Japan	KO	1	2:41
2019-01-23	Loss	(Thailand) Ekpipup Mor.Krunghtepthonburi	Rajadamnern Stadium	Bangkok, Thailand	Decision	5	3:00
2018-09-02	Win	(Thailand) Ali Lo Petbontong	SNKA TITANS NEOS 24	Tokyo, Japan	KO (right low kick)	2	1:35
2018-07-08	Win	(Thailand) Petyaso Dabransarakarm	SNKA MAGNUM 47	Tokyo, Japan	Decision (unanimous)	5	3:00
2018-05-31	Draw	(Thailand) Suntos Watacharagym	Rajadamnern Stadium	Bangkok, Thailand	Decision	5	3:00
2018-03-11	Win	(Thailand) Ninmongkon PetpumMuaythai	SNKA MAGNUM 46	Tokyo, Japan	TKO (corner stoppage)	1	1:26
2017-12-10	Win	(Thailand) Toto PetpumMuaythai	SNKA SOUL IN THE RING 15	Tokyo, Japan	KO	1	2:30
2017-09-17	Win	(Thailand) Mafueanglek Chor.Nor.Patalun	SNKA TITANS NEOS 22	Tokyo, Japan	TKO (corner stoppage)	2	2:25
Defends the WKBA World Bantamweight title.
2017-04-16	Win	(Thailand) Anuchit Tamswamuaythaigym	SNKA TITANS NEOS 21	Tokyo, Japan	TKO (corner stoppage)	3	1:24
2016-12-11	Win	(Thailand) Krunsin PetpumMuaythai	SNKA SOUL IN THE RING XIV	Tokyo, Japan	TKO (corner stoppage)	2	2:43
2016-09-18	Win	(Thailand) Hongtonglek Chor Fanpuriansee	SNKA TITANS NEOS 20	Tokyo, Japan	Decision (unanimous)	5	3:00
2016-07-27	Win	(Thailand) Kaoniew Sitpuyainirun	Rajadamnern Stadium	Bangkok, Thailand	TKO	3	
2016-04-17	Win	(Thailand) Fonphet Chuwattana	SNKA TITANS NEOS XIX	Tokyo, Japan	Decision (split)	5	3:00
2015-12-13	Win	(Thailand) Luktao Mor.Tamachat	SNKA SOUL IN THE RING 13	Tokyo, Japan	KO	2	3:00
2015-09-20	Win	(Thailand) Mongkonchai Sor.Mirchan	SNKA TITANS NEOS XVIII	Tokyo, Japan	KO (left hook)	1	1:53
Wins the vacant WKBA World Bantamweight title.
2015-03-15	Loss	(Thailand) Fonphet Chuwattana	SNKA MAGNUM 37	Tokyo, Japan	Decision (unanimous)	5	3:00
Failed to capture Rajadamnern Stadium Bantamweight title and lost WKBA World Bantamweight title.
2014-12-14	Win	(Thailand) Chansaknoi Sakrunruang	SNKA Soul in the Ring XII	Tokyo, Japan	KO	1	1:58
2014-09-13	Win	(Thailand) Fonpet Chuwattana	SNKA TITANS NEOS XVI	Tokyo, Japan	Decision (unanimous)	5	3:00
2014-04-20	Win	(Thailand) Chanaek Sor.Mantanasanchai	SNKA TITANS NEOS 15	Tokyo, Japan	TKO (corner stoppage)	1	1:36
Wins inaugural WKBA World Bantamweight title.
2013-12-08	Win	(Thailand) Wanchai Sitsaitong	SNKA SOUL IN THE RING VI	Tokyo, Japan	TKO	2	1:37
2013-09-16	Loss	(Thailand) Fonpet Chuwattana	SNKA TITANS NEOS XIV	Tokyo, Japan	Decision (split)	5	3:00
For the vacant Rajadamnern Stadium Bantamweight (118 lbs) title.
2013-07-21	Win	(Thailand) Ektawan Mor.Krugnthepthonburi	SNKA MAGNUM 32	Tokyo, Japan	TKO (punches)	2	1:15
2013-03-10	Loss	(Thailand) Manasak Pinsinchai	SNKA MAGNUM 31	Tokyo, Japan	Decision (unanimous)	5	3:00
For the Rajadamnern Stadium Bantamweight title.
2012-12-31	Win	(Korea) Kim Sangjae	Dream 18/Glory 4: Tokyo	Saitama, Japan	Decision (unanimous)	3	3:00
2012-09-15	Win	(Thailand) Jompet Chuwattana	SNKA TITANS NEOS 12	Tokyo, Japan	TKO	1	2:21
2012-07-22	Win	(Japan) Arashi Fujihara	SNKA MAGNUM 29	Tokyo, Japan	TKO (3 knockdowns/elbows)	1	2:36
2012-04-22	Win	(Thailand) Somtamuisan Acegym	SNKA TITANS NEOS 11	Tokyo, Japan	TKO	3	2:55
2011-12-17	Win	(Thailand) Taharnek Paradongym	SNKA SOUL IN THE RING IX	Tokyo, Japan	KO	2	2:50
2011-09-04	Win	(Japan) Takuya Takahashi	SNKA TITANS NEOS X	Tokyo, Japan	KO	1	2:24
2011-07-04	Win	(Japan) Hiroki Koshikawa	SNKA MAGNUM 26	Tokyo, Japan	KO (straight right)	1	1:10
Defends SNKA Flyweight title.
2011-04-17	Win	(Japan) Masanori Matsuzaki	SNKA TITANS NEOS IX	Tokyo, Japan	TKO (doctor stoppage)	1	0:49
2010-12-30	Loss	(Japan) Arashi Fujihara	World Victory Road Presents: Soul of Fight	Tokyo, Japan	Decision (unanimous)	5	3:00
2010-10-24	Win	(Japan) Gatten Furukawa	SNKA MAGNUM 24	Tokyo, Japan	TKO (doctor stoppage)	1	2:08
2010-07-25	Win	(Thailand) Fonpet Chuwattana	SNKA MAGNUM 23	Tokyo, Japan	Decision (unanimous)	3	3:00
2010-03-07	Win	(Japan) Hiroki Koshikawa	SNKA MAGNUM 22	Tokyo, Japan	Decision (unanimous)	5	3:00
Wins SNKA Flyweight title.
2009-10-25	Win	(Japan) Atom Tataki	SNKA MAGNUM 21	Tokyo, Japan	Decision (unanimous)	3	3:00
2009-07-12	Win	(Thailand) Lukton	SNKA MAGNUM 20	Tokyo, Japan	KO	1	0:26
2009-04-05	Win	(Japan) Haruya Ohama	SNKA Superkick	Tokyo, Japan	KO	2	1:05
2009-03-08	Win	(Japan) Tatsuya Nanase	SNKA MAGNUM 19	Tokyo, Japan	Decision (unanimous)	3	3:00
2008-12-14	Win	(Japan) Masanori Usui	SNKA SOUL IN THE RING VI	Tokyo, Japan	KO	1	0:55
2008-08-29	Loss	(Japan) Hiroki Akimoto	K-1 Koshien -KING OF UNDER 18-	Tokyo, Japan	Decision (unanimous)	3	3:00
2008-07-13	Draw	(Japan) Daihachi Furuoka	SNKA MAGNUM 17	Tokyo, Japan	Decision	3	3:00
2008-03-09	Win	(Japan) Yuki Ueba	SNKA MAGNUM 16	Tokyo, Japan	Decision (majority)	2	3:00
2007-09-16	Win	(Japan) Masamitsu Ibara	SNKA TITANS NEOS 2	Tokyo, Japan	KO (straight right)	1	1:22
Legend: Win Loss Draw/no contest Notes

== See also ==
- List of male kickboxers
