= All Japan Kickboxing Federation =

Defunct governing body for professional kickboxing in Japan

All Japan Kickboxing Federation (ja: 全日本キックボクシング連盟, A.J.K.F.) was the Japan-based sanctioning and promoting body of professional kickboxing. It was established in 1987 and it was dissolved in 2009. The informal name was "Zen Nihon Kikku. Masato who won K-1 World Max in 2003 debuted as a professional kickboxer at AJKF.

== History ==
=== Establishment ===
All Japan Kickboxing Federation (AJKF) was established in July 1987 by former members of the Martial Arts Japan Kickboxing Federation (MAJKF). This withdrawing was caused by Jun Nishikawa, the owner of Nishikawa Gym, and Toshio Kaneda, the event promoter. They enticed all of the current champions and other kickboxing gyms from MAJKF. The champions were sanctioned as the first champions of AJKF automatically. After establishment of AJKF, other gyms joined AJKF before holding the 1st AJKF event. The gyms which joined AJKF were AKI gym, Nishikawa gym, Hikari gym, Oguni gym, Fudokan, Fuji gym, Iwamoto gym, and Yamato gym.

Weight class	Name	Team
Flyweight	Kimihiko Akado	Nishikawa gym
Bantamweight	Shinichi Mishima	Hikari gym
Featherweight	Takashi Aoyama	Oguni gym
Lightweight	Kyoji Saito	Oguni gym
Welterweight	Tetsuya Sakiyama	Nishikawa gym

Makoto Fujita was chosen for the chairman, Kenji Kurosaki was chosen for the counselor, Ichiro Ozawa the member of the House of Representatives of Japan was chosen for the commissioner. At that time,

On July 15, 1987, AJKF hold its first event at Korakuen Hall in Tokyo. The main bout was the match between Tetsuya Sakiyama and Lakchart from Thailand. After the establishment of AJKF, Kaneda got power to control AJKF because he knew the show business very well as he had been working for the event company for long time. He told "Nissho" a company which he worked as a managing director to establish "Nissho Enterprize" which is a show business company. He assumed its CEO. This company had got strong power, so it was regarded as the actual body of AJKF. In addition, "All Japan Enterprize" which was the company Kaneda had worked before cooperated with World Kickboxing Association(WKA), Fuhita the chairman of AJKF also held the post of vice-president of WKA. For this reason, he could invite famous foreign kickboxers from Europe and North America including Maurice Smith, Rob Kaman, and Peter Smit.

In the end of the 1980s, Nissho left Nisho Enterprize. Nisho Enterprize changed its name to "All japan Enterprize" and started inviting more other famous foreign kickboxers. In the beginning of the 1990s, the popularity of AJKF started decreasing, and AJKF were hard up for money.

=== Split (NJKF) ===
In 1996, AJKF was broken up to two organizations. The New Japan Kickboxing Federation (NJKF) was established by Makoto Fujita who was the chairman of AJKF. The NJKF side enticed many kickboxing gyms, kickboxers and 3 current champions from AJKF. The Featherweight champion Hideaki Suzuki, the Lightweight champion Yasuhiro Uchida and the Welterweight champion Shinji Matsuura.

=== Bankruptcy and rebirth ===
In May 1997, AJKF cooperated with K-1, and moved its headquarters to Kinshicho in Sumida, Tokyo. Moreover, AJKF opened a new kickboxing gym "K Public gym" there. In addition, AJKF asked Hiroyuki Yoshino who was the former Japanese national champion of professional boxing to join AJKF. AJKF sent some top kickboxers to K-1 event twice (July 20, November 9), but Atsushi Tateshima who was one of the most famous kickboxer in Japan refused to take part in K-1.

In October 1997, All Japan Enterprize was bankrupted and AJKF lost its true body. All of the members of the staff left AJKF. After the bankruptcy, some high-powered gyms established the board of directors and started managing AJKF. And then, AJKF moved its office to Higashi-Azabu in Minato, Tokyo. For this event, AJKF changed its system. All kickboxing events are held by each kickboxing gym individually instead of the headquarters of AJKF or event company.

=== Split (J-NET) ===
Although AJKF started controlling kickboxing again, "Active J" which is one of kickboxing gym joined AJKF tried to continue holding event by themselves. This was regarded as an infringement of AJKF rules. Moreover, the representative of Active J ignored recommendation to participate the board of directors. For this reason, Active J was dismissed from AJKF. After dismissal, Active J established J-NETWORK(J-NET), and set gyms under the direct management of Active J up in business, and make them join J-NET. Keita Kainuma the current AJKF Bantamweight and some famous kickboxers moved to J-NET because of this incident. Takayuki Kohiruimaki was one of them.

=== Split (K-U) ===
Hachoji FSG and other kickboxing gyms which were members of AJKF set a press conference on June 14, 1998, and announced that they are going to establish a new kickboxing organization "Kick Boxing-Union" (K-U). 14 kickboxing gyms and the 3 current AJKF champions moved to K-U. The Featherweight champion Shinya Sakuma, the Lightweight champion Nobumitsu Sudo and the Welterweight champion Tatsuya Suzuki.

=== Decline ===
On June 1, 1998, Kaneda returned to a representative of AJKF, and it started controlling the kickboxing events again. The office was moved to Asao-ku, Kawasaki in Kanagawa. At that time, AJKF improved relationship to J-NET because people who disliked J-NET had already removed to K-U. Actually, the event held by J-NET on February 2, many kickboxers from AJKF participated in it. Moreover, many kickboxers from J-NET participated in the tournament for the vacant AJKF tiles (Lightweight and Featherweight) held by AJKF. For these the interchange between AJKF and J-NET became active.

In 1999, AJKF got a new sponsor, and they removed their office to kitashinjuku in Shinjuku, Tokyo on May 28. They established their 2 official kickboxing gyms(AJ Public gym and Sakushin-kaikan) there as an annex to the office. After removal, Kensaku Maeda who was one of the top kickboxer left AJKF, but Satoshi Kobayashi and his gym "Fujiwara gym" rejoined AJKF . On November 30, Taniyama gym left AJKF.

In March 2000, Masato became independent from AJKF and he established Silver Wolf.

On May 11, 2007, Satoshi Kobayashi, former kickboxer, assumed the general manager of AJKF.

=== Arrest and dissolution ===
In 2008, AJKF started new series event "Krush" with K-1, and the Krush implementation committee was established. The bout in Krush was under K-1 rules.

On June 21, 2009, Kobayashi, the general manager, produced the event "The stray dog Blitz tactics 2009", but it became the last event of AJKF.

On June 22, Toshio Kaneda, the AJKF representative, was arrested for helping sham marriage for a Korean woman. He was suspected of "making False Entries in the Original of Notarized Deeds"(Article 157) and "using it". In addition, the manager of sham marriage was a criminal syndicate (yakuza), and AJKF was suspected as they had a relationship with yakuza because the building which the office of AJKF located accepted some front companies for organized crime operations. At that day, the AJKF office was searched and seized, and Kaneda was relieved from his duty.

On July 15, the office was closed and AJKF was dissolved in between July 15 and August 20.

== Championship history ==
=== Flyweight championship ===
Weight limit: 112 lbs

No.	Name	Date	Defenses
1	(Japan) Kimihiko Akado (def. )	July 15, 1987	3 def.
Akado vacates the title on January, 1992.
2	(Japan) Takahiro Yamada (def. )	March 24, 1996	

=== Bantamweight championship ===
Weight limit: 118 lbs

No.	Name	Date	Defenses
1	(Japan) Jiro Kameyama (def. )	January 3, 1988	
2	(Japan) Kotaro Tsuchida (def. Jiro Kameyama)	October 10, 1988	
Tsuchida vacates the title in December 1988.
3	(Japan) Kimihiko Akado (def. )	January 25, 1992	
4	(Japan) Taro Tokai (def. )	March 26, 1994	
5	(Japan) Toshimichi Nakajima (def. )	January 7, 1995	1 def.
6	(Japan) Joe Tsuchiya (def. )	September 29, 1995	
7	(Japan) Keita Kainuma (def. Joe Tsuchiya)	September 29, 1996	1 def.
Kainuma vacates the title in 1997.
8	(Japan) Ken Yasukawa (def. Minoru Shinkai)	January 4, 2001	2 def. (Makoto Warisawa)
Yasukawa vacates the title in May, 2003 as he retires.
9	(Japan) Noriyuki Hiratani (def. Arashi Fujihara)	August 17, 2003	
10	(Japan) Noriyuki Hiratani (def. Arashi Fujihara)	August 17, 2003	
11	(Japan) Arashi Fujihara (def. Kazuhiko Shingo)	November 19, 2004	def. Nobuchika Terado on August 25, 2007
12	(Japan) Nobuchika Terado (def. Shota Takiya)	January 1, 2009	

=== Featherweight championship ===
Weight limit: 124 lbs

No.	Name	Date	Defenses
1	(Japan) Takashi Aoyama (def. )	July 15, 1987	
2	(Japan) Junichi Kagami (def. )	January 29, 1989	
3	(Japan) Takahiro Shimizu (def. Junichi Kagami)	September 5, 1989	
4	(Japan) Atsushi Tateshima (def. 椿宗徳)	April 21, 1991	
5	(Japan) Kensaku Maeda (def. Atsushi Tateshima)	July 18, 1992	
6	(Japan) Atsushi Tateshima (def. Kensaku Maeda)	November 27, 1993	
7	(Japan) Takaya Sato (def. Atsushi Tateshima)	July 30, 1994	
8	(Japan) Atsushi Tateshima (def. Takaya Sato)	July 30, 1995	
9	(Japan) Hideaki Suzuki (def. Atsushi Tateshima)	March 24, 1996	
10	(Japan) Shinya Sakuma (def. )	April 29, 1997	
11	(Japan) Hiromasa Masuda (def. )	July 13, 1999	
12	(Japan) Naoyuki Sugie (def. Shinsuke Endo)	February 16, 2001	
13	(Japan) Hisanori Maeda (def. Kenji Takemura)	November 17, 2002	
14	(Japan) Genki Yamamoto (def. Hisanori Maeda)	December 7, 2003	def. Masahiro Yamamoto on December 5, 2004
15	(Japan) Masahiro Yamamoto (def. Genki Yamamoto)	September 19, 2005	def. Yosuke Mizuochi on January 4, 2008

=== Super Featherweight championship ===
Weight limit: 130 lbs

No.	Name	Date	Defenses
1	(Japan) Naoki ishikawa (def. Naoki Maeda)	January 4, 2006	def. Masami on July 23, 2006; draws with Naoki Maeda on June 21, 2009

=== Lightweight championship ===
Weight limit: 136 lbs

No.	Name	Date	Defenses
1	(Japan) Kyoji Saio (def. )	July 15, 1987	3 defenses
2	(Japan) Sho Kawatani (def. )	July 14, 1991	2 defenses
3	(Japan) Kenichi Sugita (def. Sho Kawatani)	January 23, 1994	
4	(Japan) Yasuhiro Uchida (def. )	January 7, 1995	
5	(Japan) Nobumitsu Sudo (def. Hisayuki Kanazawa)	June 21, 1997	
6	(Japan) Hisayuki Kanazawa (def. Tomohiro Shimano)	May 11, 1999	
7	(Japan) Satoshi Kobayashi (def. Hisayuki Kanazawa)	January 21, 2000	
Kobayashi vacates the title on August 1, 2000.
8	(Japan) Hisayuki Kanazawa (def. Aou Hayashi)	January 4, 2001	
Kanazawa vacates the title on October 12, 2001.
9	(Japan) Aou Hayashi (def. Kenichi Hamagawa)	January 4, 2002	
10	(Japan) Haruaki Otsuki (def. Aou Hayashi)	January 4, 2003	def. Takhito Fujimasa on January 1, 2004
Otsuki vacates the title on September 25, 2004.
11	(Mongolia) Tsogto Amara (def. Satoruvashicoba)	January 4, 2005	
Amara vacates the title in October, 2005.
12	(Japan) Satoruvashicoba (def. Koji Yoshimoto)	January 4, 2006	
13	(Japan) Hiromasa Masuda (def. Satoruvashicoba)	July 23, 2006	
Masuda vacates the title in March, 2008.
14	(Japan) Tomofumi Endo (def. Kan Itabashi)	December 5, 2008	

=== Welterweight championship ===
Weight limit: 148 lbs

No.	Name	Date	Defenses
1	(Japan) Tetsuya Mukoyama (def. )	July 15, 1987	
2	(Japan) Hironobu Murakoshi (def. )	March 12, 1988	
3	(Japan) Takatora Funaki (def. )	May 29, 1988	4 defenses
4	(Japan) Keizo Kojima (def. )	1992	
5	(Japan) Takatora Funaki (def. )	June 19, 1993	
6	(Japan) Shinji Matsura (def. )	1995	
7	(Japan) Tatsuya Suzuki (def. )	1997	
8	(Japan) Masato (def. Tomoharu Chiba)	March 17, 1999	
Masato vacates the title on March 14, 2000.
9	(Japan) Yasuhiro Uchida (def. Tomoharu Chiba)	January 14, 2001	
Uchida vacates the title on October 12, 2001.
10	(Japan) Yutaro Yamauchi (def. Yoichiro Mikami)	March 8, 2003	def. Yuya Yamamoto on January 4, 2004; def. Yuya Yamamoto on November 19, 2004
Yamauchi vacates the title in November, 2005.
11	(Japan) Daiki (def. Mitsumasa Horikawa)	April 21, 2006	
Daiki vacates the title on April 1, 2007.
12	(Japan) Yuya Yamamoto (def. Mitsumasa Horikawa)	May 11, 2007	
13	(Switzerland) Christophe Pruvost (def. Yuya Yamamoto)	December 5, 2008	

=== Super Welterweight championship ===
Weight limit: 154 lbs

No.	Name	Date	Defenses
1	(Japan) Yutaro Yamauchi (def. Kazuki Hamasaki)	April 21, 2006	def. Ryusuke Mochizuki on January 1, 2007; def. Ryusuke Mochizuki on October 17, 2008

=== Middleweight championship ===
Weight limit: 160 lbs

No.	Name	Date	Defenses
1	(Japan) Tetsuya Mukoyama (def. )	May, 1989	
2	(Japan) Akeomi Nitta	April 27, 2000	def. Takahiko Shimizu on January 4, 2001
3	(Japan) TOMO (def. Takaaki Nakamura)	June 12, 2005	
TOMO vacates the title on April 1, 2007.
4	(Japan) Takaaki Nakamura (def. Yuuki Shirakawa)	June 10, 2007	def. Ryutaro Yoshitake on December 7, 2007; def. Shingo Eguchi on December 5, 2008

=== Heavvweight championship ===
Weight limit: + 160 lbs

No.	Name	Date	Defenses
1	(Japan) Riki Oh (def. )	January 7, 1995	
2	(Japan) Yasuhiro Anbe (def. DEION)	May 4, 2002	
3	(Japan) Kazushi Nishida (def. Yasuhiro Anbe)	September 27, 2003	
4	(Japan) Akihiro Gono (def. Kazushi Nishida)	February 6, 2005	
Gono vacates the title on April 1, 2007.
