= 2017 in K-1 =

Mixed martial arts events

Information
- First date: February 25

Events

Fights

Chronology
2016 in K-1	2017 in K-1	2018 in K-1

The year 2017 is the 24th year in the history of the K-1. Its events included the K-1 World GP 2017 Lightweight (62.5kg) Championship Tournament, held on 25 February at Yoyogi National Gymnasium in Tokyo.

== List of events ==
#	Event title	Date	Arena	Location
1	K-1 World GP 2017 Lightweight Championship Tournament	February 25, 2017	Yoyogi National Gymnasium	Tokyo, Japan
2	K-1 World GP 2017: Super Bantamweight Tournament	April 22, 2017	Yoyogi National Gymnasium	Tokyo, Japan
3	K-1 World GP 2017 Super Welterweight Championship Tournament	June 18, 2017	Saitama Super Arena	Saitama, Japan
4	K-1 World GP 2017 Welterweight Championship Tournament	September 18, 2017	Saitama Super Arena	Saitama, Japan

== K-1 World GP 2017 Lightweight Championship Tournament ==
K-1 WGP -62.5kg Tournament Championship
- Promotion: K-1
- Date: February 25, 2017
- Venue: Yoyogi National Gymnasium
- City: Tokyo, Japan

Fight Card
Weight Class				Method	Round	Time	Notes
Lightweight 62.5kg	(China) Wei Rui	def.	(Japan) Ren Hiramoto	Decision (split)	3	3:00	Lightweight GP Final
Super Featherweight 60kg	(Japan) Taiga	def.	(Japan) Hirotaka Urabe	Decision (unanimous)	3	3:00	For the K-1 Super Featherweight Championship
Super Welterweight 70kg	(Japan) Hinata	def.	(Japan) Shintaro Matsukura	Decision (unanimous)	3	3:00	
Lightweight 62.5kg	(China) Wei Rui	def.	(Romania) Cristian Spetcu	Decision (unanimous)	3	3:00	Lightweight GP Semi-final
Lightweight 62.5kg	(Japan) Ren Hiramoto	def.	(Thailand) Gonnapar Weerasakreck	KO (Left Cross)	1	1:14	Lightweight GP Semi-final
Super Lightweight 65kg	(Japan) Masaaki Noiri	def.	(Netherlands) Younes Smaili	Decision (unanimous)	3	3:00	
Heavyweight	(Morocco) Ibrahim El Bouni	def.	(Japan) Makoto Uehara	KO (Left hook)	2	1:33	
Lightweight 62.5kg	(Romania) Cristian Spetcu	def.	(Japan) Toshiki Taniyama	Decision (unanimous)	3	3:00	Lightweight GP Quarter-final
Lightweight 62.5kg	(China) Wei Rui	def.	(Japan) Daizo Sasaki	KO (Left Hook)	2	1:04	Lightweight GP Quarter-final
Lightweight 62.5kg	(Thailand) Gonnapar Weerasakreck	def.	(Japan) Koya Urabe	Decision (unanimous)	3	3:00	Lightweight GP Quarter-final
Lightweight 62.5kg	(Japan) Ren Hiramoto	def.	(France) Brice Delval	Decision (majority)	3	3:00	Lightweight GP Quarter-final
Lightweight 62.5kg	(Japan) Rukiya Anpo	def.	(Japan) Hiroshi Mizumashi	KO (Jumping Switch kick)	2	0:06	Lightweight GP Reserve
Preliminary Card
Super Welterweight 70 kg	(Japan) Katsuya Jinbo	def.	(Japan) Taketo	KO (body punch)	1	2:06	
Super Lightweight 65 kg	(Japan) Atsuto Matsumoto	vs.	(Japan) Kensei Kondo	Draw	3	3:00	
Super Bantamweight 55 kg	(Japan) Hiroto Ishizuka	def.	(Japan) Yuta Kuwata	Decision (unanimous)	3	3:00	

=== 62.5kg GP Championship ===
Quarterfinals
(Japan) Ren Hiramoto	MD
(France) Brice Delval	3r.
(Japan) Koya Urabe	3r.
(Thailand) Gonnapar Weerasakreck	UD
(Japan) Daizo Sasaki	2r.
(China) Wei Rui	KO
(Japan) Toshiki Taniyama	3r.
(Romania) Cristian Spetcu	UD

Semifinals
(Japan) Ren Hiramoto	KO
(Thailand) Gonnapar Weerasakreck	1r.
(China) Wei Rui	UD
(Romania) Cristian Spetcu	3r.

Finals
(Japan) Ren Hiramoto	3r.
(China) Wei Rui	SD

== K-1 World GP 2017: Super Bantamweight Tournament ==
K-1 WGP -55kg Tournament Championship
- Promotion: K-1
- Date: April 22, 2017
- Venue: Yoyogi National Gymnasium
- City: Tokyo, Japan

Fight Card
Weight Class				Method	Round	Time	Notes
Super Bantamweight 55kg	(Japan) Yoshiki Takei	def.	(Japan) Kenji Kubo	Decision (unanimous)	3	3:00	Super Bantamweight GP Final
Super Lightweight 65kg	(Thailand) Kaew Fairtex	def.	(Japan) Hideaki Yamazaki	Decision (unanimous)	3	3:00	For the K-1 Super Lightweight Championship
Featherweight 57.5 kg	(Japan) Takeru Segawa	def.	(United States) Victor Saravia	KO	3	2:23	
Suprr Bantamweight 57.5kg	(Japan) Kenji Kubo	def.	(Japan) Nobuchika Terado	KO	2	3:00	Super Bantamweight GP Semi-final
Super Bantamweight 57.5kg	(Japan) Yoshiki Takei	def.	(Japan) Keisuke Ishida	KO	1	1:32	Super Bantamweight GP Semi-final
Super Lightweight 65kg	(Japan) Tetsuya Yamato	def.	(Japan) Hiroya	KO	2	0:58	
Heavyweight	(Japan) Koichi	def.	(Japan) K-Jee	KO	3	0:38	
Super Bantamweight 55kg	(Japan) Kenji Kubo	def.	(China) Son Dachen	Decision (unanimous)	3	3:00	Super Bantamweight GP Quarter-final
Super Bantamweight 55kg	(Japan) Nobuchika Terado	def.	(United Kingdom) Jamie Whelan	Decision (split)	3	3	Super Bantamweight GP Quarter-final
Super Bantamweight 55kg	(Japan) Yoshiki Takei	def.	(Spain) Antonio Orden	KO	3	2:31	Super Bantamweight GP Quarter-final
Super Bantamweight 55kg	(Japan) Keisuke Ishida	def.	(France) Charles Bongiovanni	KO	2	1:43	Super Bantamweight GP Quarter-final
Super Bantamweight 55kg	(Japan) Namito Izawa	def.	(Japan) Yuya Suzuki	Decision (split)	3	3:00	Super Bantamweight GP Reserve
Preliminary Card
Super Welterweight 70 kg	(Japan) Hiromi Wajima	def.	(Japan) Kazunari Kimura	TKO	1	1:13	
Lightweight 62.5 kg	(Japan) Seiya Ueda	vs.	(Japan) Masaru	Decision (unanimous)	3	3:00	
Super Featherweight 60 kg	(Japan) Yuma Saikyo	def.	(Japan) Hiroki Kokubo	KO	1	2:48	

=== 55 kg GP Championship ===
Quarterfinals
(Japan) Keisuke Ishida	KO
(France) Charles Bongiovanni	2r.
(Japan) Yoshiki Takei	KO
(Spain) Antonio Orden	3r.
(Japan) Nobuchika Terado	SD
(United Kingdom) Jamie Whelan	Ex.R
(Japan) Kenji Kubo	UD
(China) Son Dachen	3r.

Semifinals
(Japan) Keisuke Ishida	1r.
(Japan) Yoshiki Takei	KO
(Japan) Nobuchika Terado	2r.
(Japan) Kenji Kubo	KO

Finals
(Japan) Yoshiki Takei	UD
(Japan) Kenji Kubo	3r.

== K-1 World GP 2017 Super Welterweight Championship Tournament ==
K-1 World GP 2017 Super Welterweight Championship Tournament
- Promotion: K-1
- Date: June 18, 2017
- Venue: Saitama Super Arena
- City: Saitama, Japan

Fight Card
Weight Class				Method	Round	Time	Notes
Super Welterweight 70kg	(Belarus) Chingiz Allazov	def.	(Japan) Yasuhiro Kido	Decision (Unanimous)	3	3:00	Super Welterweight GP Final
Super Lightweight 65kg	(Japan) Masaaki Noiri	def.	(Thailand) Kaew Fairtex (c)	Ext.R Decision (Split)	4	3:00	Super Lightweight Championship Match
Lightweight 62.5kg	(China) Wei Rui (c)	def.	(Thailand) Gonnapar Weerasakreck	Decision (Majority)	3	3:00	Lightweight Championship Match
Featherweight 57.5kg	(Japan) Takeru	def.	(Russia) Buvaisar Paskhaev	KO (Left Hook to the Body)	3	1:17	
Super Welterweight 70kg	(Belarus) Chingiz Allazov	def.	(Netherlands) Jordann Pikeur	KO (Right Hook)	1	2:17	Super Welterweight GP Semi-final
Super Welterweight 70kg	(Japan) Yasuhiro Kido	def.	(Sweden) Sanny Dahlbeck	KO (Low Kicks)	1	2:28	Super Welterweight GP Semi-final
Super Featherweight 60kg	(Japan) Taiga	def.	(Japan) Koji	Decision (Unanimous)	3	3:00	
Featherweight 57.5kg	(Japan) Haruma Saikyo	def.	(Japan) Kaito Ozawa	Decision (Unanimous)	3	3:00	
Super Lightweight 65kg	(Japan) Ren Hiramoto	def.	(Russia) Umar Paskhaev	Decision (Unanimous)	3	3:00	
Super Welterweight 70kg	(Netherlands) Jordann Pikeur	def.	(Japan) Hinata	Decision (Unanimous)	3	3:00	Super Welterweight GP Quarter-final
Super Welterweight 70kg	(Belarus) Chingiz Allazov	def.	(Japan) Hiroki Nakajima	KO (2 Knockdowns)	2	1:18	Super Welterweight GP Quarter-final
Super Welterweight 70kg	(Sweden) Sanny Dahlbeck	def.	(Japan) Yu Hirono	TKO (Doctor Stoppage)	2	2:33	Super Welterweight GP Quarter-final
Super Welterweight 70kg	(Japan) Yasuhiro Kido	def.	(United Kingdom) Luke Whelan	KO (Left Middle Kick)	3	1:34	Super Welterweight GP Quarter-final
Super Welterweight 70kg	(Japan) Yoichi Yamazaki	def.	(Japan) Tomoaki Makino	Decision (Unanimous)	3	3:00	Super Welterweight GP Reserve Fight
Preliminary Card
Super Weleterweight 70kg	(Japan) Katsuya Jinbo	def.	(Japan) Masato Uchiyama	KO (Right Cross)	1	2:21	
Lightweight 62.5kg	(Japan) Yuki Takeuchi	def.	(Japan) Ryo Tabata	KO (Right Cross)	1	0:31	
Super Lightweight 65kg	(Japan) Hayato Suzuki	def.	(Japan) Yuki Koge	KO (Left Cross)	2	1:02	
Super Featherweight 60kg	(Japan) Yuma Saikyo	def.	(Japan) Takuma Kawaguchi	Decision (Unanimous)	3	3:00	

=== 70 kg GP Championship ===
Quarterfinals
(Japan) Yasuhiro Kido	KO
(United Kingdom) Luke Whelan	3r.
(Sweden) Sanny Dahlbeck	TKO
(Japan) Yu Hirono	2r.
(Belarus) Chingiz Allazov	KO
(Japan) Hiroki Nakajima	2r.
(Netherlands) Jordann Pikeur	UD
(Japan) Hinata	3r.

Semifinals
(Japan) Yasuhiro Kido	KO
(Sweden) Sanny Dahlbeck	1r.
(Belarus) Chingiz Allazov	KO
(Netherlands) Jordann Pikeur	1r.

Finals
(Belarus) Chingiz Allazov	UD
(Japan) Yasuhiro Kido	3r.

== K-1 World GP 2017 Welterweight Championship Tournament ==
K-1 World GP 2017 Welterweight Championship Tournament
- Promotion: K-1
- Date: September 18, 2017
- Venue: Saitama Super Arena
- City: Saitama, Japan

Fight Card
Weight Class				Method	Round	Time	Notes
Welterweight 67.5kg	(Japan) Yuta Kubo	def.	(Nepal) Mohan Dragon	Decision (Unanimous)	3	3:00	Welterweight Tournament Final
Featherweight 57.5kg	(Japan) Takeru (c)	def.	(China) Wang Junguang	Decision (Unanimous)	3	3:00	K-1 World GP Featherweight Title Match
Super Featherweight 60kg	(Greece) Stavros Exakoustidis	def.	(Japan) Taiga	KO (Left Hook)	1	2:41	
Super Bantamweight 55kg	(Japan) Yoshiki Takei	def.	(Japan) Namito Izawa	KO (Punches)	3	1:10	
Welterweight 67.5kg	(Japan) Yuta Kubo	def.	(Japan) Hitoshi Tsukakoshi	KO (Low Kicks)	2	2:36	Welterweight Tournament Semi-finals
Welterweight 67.5kg	(Nepal) Mohan Dragon	def.	(Japan) Kazuki Yamagiwa	KO (Left Cross)	2	2:58	Welterweight Tournament Semi-finals
Super Featherweight 60kg	(Japan) Hirotaka Urabe	def.	(Japan) Masahiro Yamamoto	KO (Right Cross)	2	2:51	
Super Welterweight 70kg	(Japan) Hinata	def.	(Spain) Sergio Sanchez	Decision (Unanimous)	3	3:00	
Super Featherweight 60kg	(Japan) Koji	def.	(Japan) Kotaro Shimano	Decision (Unanimous)	3	3:00	
Welterweight 67.5kg	(Japan) Yuta Kubo	def.	(Brazil) Minoru Kimura	Decision (Unanimous)	3	3:00	Welterweight Tournament Quarter-finals
Welterweight 67.5kg	(Japan) Hitoshi Tsukakoshi	def.	(China) Han Wenbao	Decision (Unanimous)	3	3:00	Welterweight Tournament Quarter-finals
Welterweight 67.5kg	(Armenia) Melsik Baghdasaryan	def.	(Japan) Kazuki Yamagiwa	Decision (Unanimous)	3	3:00	Welterweight Tournament Quarter-finals
Welterweight 67.5kg	(Nepal) Mohan Dragon	def.	(Japan) Daiki Watabe	TKO (2 Knockdowns)	1	2:15	Welterweight Tournament Quarter-finals
Welterweight 67.5kg	(Japan) Keita Makihira	def.	(Japan) Kenji	TKO (Doctor Stoppage)	3	1:06	Welterweight Tournament Reserve Fight
Preliminary Card
Super Lightweight 65kg	(Japan) Junpei Sano	def.	(Japan) Ryu Nakarai	Decision (Unanimous)	3	2:00	K-1 College 2017 -65kg Final
Super Featherweight 60kg	(Japan) Michitaka Uchida	def.	(Japan) Ryo Shimoji	Decision (Unanimous)	3	2:00	K-1 College 2017 -60kg Final
Super Bantamweight 55kg	(Japan) Yu Nomura	def.	(Japan) Seiya Kanazuka	Decision (Unanimous)	3	2:00	K-1 College 2017 -55kg Final
Welterweight 67.5kg	(Japan) Jin Hirayama	def.	(Japan) Toshiki Watanabe	KO (Right Cross)	1	0:44	
Heavyweight	(Japan) Taichi Furuta	def.	(Japan) NORI	Decision (Majority)	3	3:00	

=== 70 kg GP Championship ===
Quarterfinals
(Nepal) Mohan Dragon	TKO
(Japan) Daiki Watabe	1r.
(Armenia) Melsik Baghdasaryan	UD
(Japan) Kazuki Yamagiwa	3r.
(Japan) Hitoshi Tsukakoshi	UD
(China) Han Wenbao	3r.
(Japan) Yuta Kubo	UD
(Brazil) Minoru Kimura	3r.

Semifinals
(Nepal) Mohan Dragon	KO
(Japan) Kazuki Yamagiwa	3r.
(Japan) Yuta Kubo	KO
(Japan) Hitoshi Tsukakoshi	2r.

Finals
(Japan) Yuta Kubo	UD
(Nepal) Mohan Dragon	3r.

== K-1 World GP 2017: inaugural Heavyweight Championship Tournament ==
K-1 World GP 2017: inaugural Heavyweight Championship Tournament
- Promotion: K-1
- Date: November 23, 2017
- Venue: Saitama Super Arena
- City: Saitama, Japan

Fight Card
Weight Class				Method	Round	Time	Notes
Heavyweight	(Croatia) Antonio Plazibat	def.	(Morocco) Ibrahim El Bouni	Decision (Unanimous)	3	3:00	Heavyweight Tournament Final
Super Bantamweight 55kg	(Japan) Yoshiki Takei	def.	(United States) Victor Saravia	KO (Body Shots)	1	1:38	
Welterweight 67.5kg	(Brazil) Minoru Kimura	def.	(Japan) Yasuhiro Kido	Decision (Unanimous)	3	3:00	
Lightweight 62.5kg	(Japan) Koya Urabe	def.	(Romania) Cristian Spetcu	Decision (Unanimous)	3	3:00	
Heavyweight	(Morocco) Ibrahim El Bouni	def.	(Netherlands) Roel Mannaart	TKO (2 Knockdowns)	1	3:00	Heavyweight Tournament Semi-finals
Heavyweight	(Croatia) Antonio Plazibat	def.	(Japan) Makoto Uehara	KO (Jumping Knee)	1	2:09	Heavyweight Tournament Semi-finals
Super Lightweight 65kg	(Japan) Ren Hiramoto	def.	(Japan) Daizo Sasaki	Decision (Unanimous)	3	3:00	
Super Featherweight 60kg	(Japan) Kosuke Komiyama	def.	(Greece) Stavros Exakoustidis	Decision (Majority)	3	3:00	
Super Lightweight 65kg	(Japan) Tetsuya Yamato	def.	(Japan) Jun Nakazawa	KO (Left Hook)	1	2:24	
Heavyweight	(Morocco) Ibrahim El Bouni	def.	(Japan) Koichi	KO (Left Hook)	1	0:20	Heavyweight Tournament Quarter-finals
Heavyweight	(Netherlands) Roel Mannaart	def.	(Japan) Masahiro Iwashita	TKO (2 Knockdowns)	1	2:47	Heavyweight Tournament Quarter-finals
Heavyweight	(Croatia) Antonio Plazibat	def.	(Japan) K-Jee	KO (Left Hook to the Body)	1	1:40	Heavyweight Tournament Quarter-finals
Heavyweight	(Japan) Makoto Uehara	def.	(France) Pacome Assi	KO (Punches)	1	2:40	Heavyweight Tournament Quarter-finals
Heavyweight	(Japan) Ryo Aitaka	def.	(Japan) Taichi Furuta	TKO (2 Knockdowns/Right Overhand)	1	2:17	Heavyweight Tournament Reserve Fight
Preliminary Card
Super Lightweight 65kg	(Japan) Kaisei Kondo	def.	(Japan) Ruku	KO (Left High Kick)	3	0:16	K-1 Koshien 2017 -65kg Final
Super Featherweight 60kg	(Japan) Shoki Kaneda	def.	(Japan) Tomoya Yokoyama	Decision (Unanimous)	3	2:00	K-1 Koshien 2017 -60kg Final
Super Bantamweight 55kg	(Japan) Tatsuya Tsubakihara	def.	(Japan) Itsuki Kobori	Decision (Unanimous)	3	2:00	K-1 Koshien 2017 -55kg Final
Super Featherweight 60kg	(Japan) Naoki Yamamoto	def.	(Japan) Hayato	Decision (unanimous)	3	3:00	
Lightweight 62.5kg	(Japan) Shota Hara	def.	(Japan) Yuto Maeda	Decision (unanimous)	3	3:00	

=== K-1 Heavyweight Tournament bracket ===
Quarterfinals
(Japan) Makoto Uehara	KO
(France) Pacome Assi	1r.
(Croatia) Antonio Plazibat	KO
(Japan) K-JEE	1r.
(Netherlands) Roel Mannaart	TKO
(Japan) Masahiro Iwashita	1r.
(Morocco) Ibrahim El Bouni	KO
(Japan) Koichi	1r.

Semifinals
(Croatia) Antonio Plazibat	KO
(Japan) Makoto Uehara	1r.
(Morocco) Ibrahim El Bouni	TKO
(Netherlands) Roel Mannaart	1r.

Finals
(Croatia) Antonio Plazibat	UD
(Morocco) Ibrahim El Bouni	3r.

== K-1 World GP 2017 Japan Survival Wars 2017 ==
K-1 World GP 2017 Japan Survival Wars 2017
- Promotion: K-1
- Date: December 27, 2017
- Venue: Korakuen Hall
- City: Tokyo, Japan

Fight Card
Weight Class				Method	Round	Time	Notes
Super Welterweight 70kg	(Japan) Hinata	def.	(Japan) Yu Hirono	Decision (Majority)	3	3:00	
Featherweight 57.5kg	(Japan) Tatsuya Tsubakihara	def.	(Japan) Haruma Saikyo	Decision (Majority)	3	3:00	
Super Bantamweight 55kg	(Japan) Taito Gunji	def.	(Japan) Shota Oiwa	Decision (Unanimous)	3	3:00	
Featherweight 57.5kg	(Japan) Yuta Murakoshi	def.	(Japan) Ryusei Ashizawa	Decision (Majority)	3	3:00	
Super Welterweight 70kg	(Japan) Hiromi Wajima	def.	(Japan) Yoichi Yamazaki	KO (Jumping Knee)	3	2:06	
Heavyweight	(Japan) Hitoshi Sugimoto	def.	(Japan) RUI	KO (Right Cross)	2	0:44	
Super Lightweight 65kg	(Japan) Yuto Shinohara	def.	(Japan) Hayato Suzuki	Decision (Split)	3	3:00	
Super Lightweight 65kg	(Japan) FUMIYA	def.	(Japan) Masanobu	KO (Right Cross)	1	1:11	
Lightweight 62.5kg	(Japan) Bazooka Koki	def.	(Japan) Yuki Takeuchi	KO (Left Hook)	1	0:34	

== See also ==
- 2017 in Glory
- 2017 in Kunlun Fight
- 2017 in ONE Championship
- 2017 in Romanian kickboxing
- 2017 in Wu Lin Feng
