= Takeru Segawa =

Japanese kickboxer (born 1991)

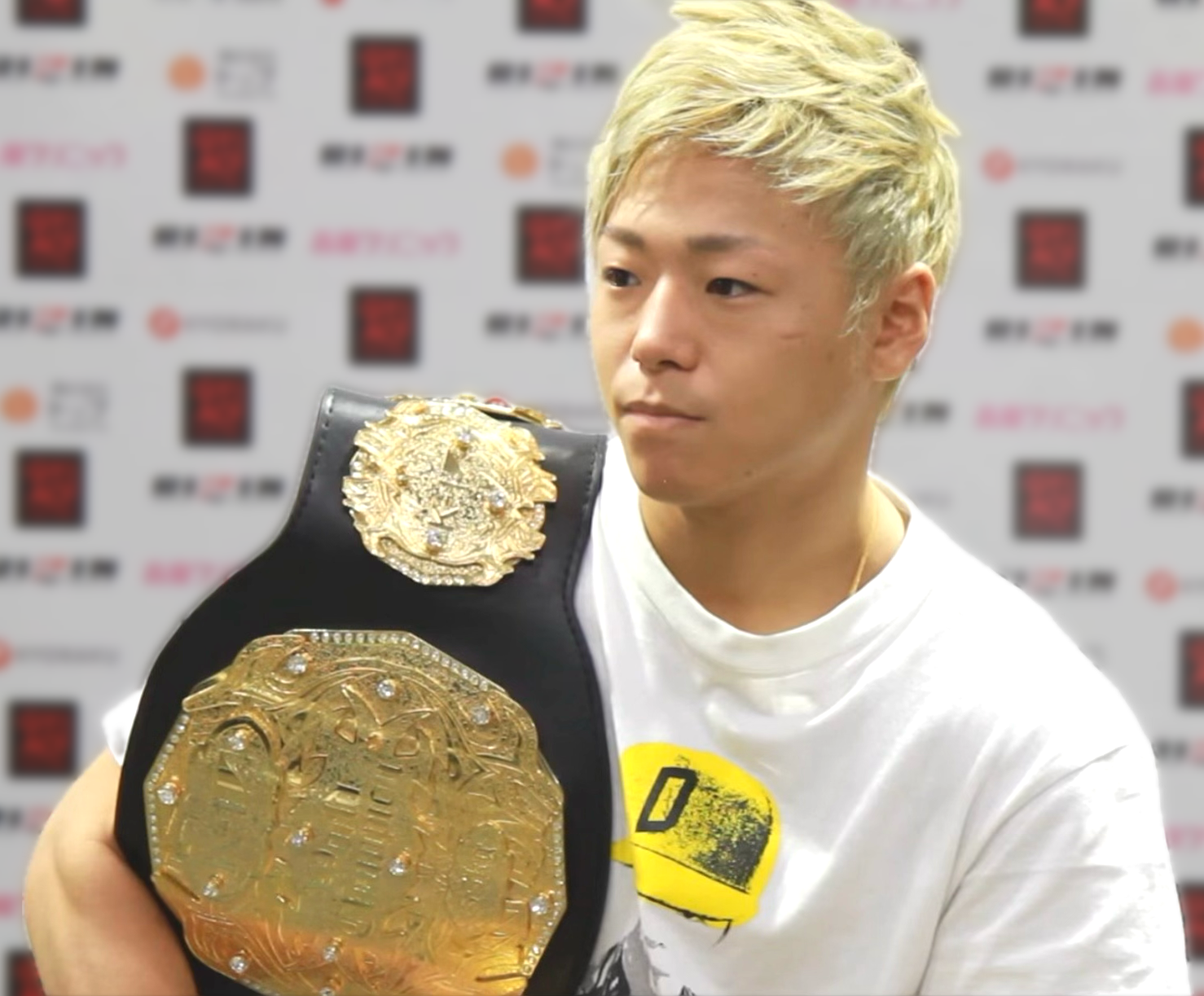
- Takeru following the 2015 Rizin NYE event
- Born: 世川 武尊; July 29, 1991 (age 35); Yonago, Japan
- Other names: Natural Born Crusher; Takeru Kaewsamrit
- Height: 1.68 m (5 ft 6 in)
- Weight: 56.7 kg (125 lb; 8.93 st), 61.2 kg (135 lb; 9.64 st)
- Division: Flyweight, Bantamweight
- Style: Karate, Kickboxing
- Fighting out of: Setagaya, Tokyo, Japan
- Team: Team VASILEUS (2022-present); K-1 Gym KREST (2017 - 2022); Team Dragon (2010-2016)
- Trainer: Masakazu Watanabe; Kensaku Maeda (former)
- Rank: Black belt in Shin Karate
- Years active: 2008-2026

Kickboxing record
- Total: 51
- Wins: 46
- By knockout: 28
- Losses: 5
- By knockout: 1
- Draws: 0
- No contests: 0

Other information
- Spouse: Aoi Kawaguchi
- Website: https://takeru-official.net/

Takeru Segawa

YouTube information
- Channel: 武尊 / TAKERU
- Years active: 2020-present
- Genre: vlog
- Subscribers: 260 thousand
- Views: 51 million
- Last updated: 04 May 2026

Takeru Segawa (Japanese: 世川 武尊, Hepburn: Segawa Takeru), known mononymously as Takeru, is a former Japanese kickboxer. He is the former ONE Interim Flyweight Kickboxing World Champion, K-1 Super Featherweight champion, K-1 Featherweight champion and K-1 Super Bantamweight champion. He is the only three weight champion in K-1 history. Takeru is considered by many to be a generational talent and one of the greatest kickboxers in the modern history of the sport, alongside his compatriot Tenshin Nasukawa.

A professional competitor since 2008, Segawa became the K-1 Super Bantamweight champion when he defeated Taiga Kawabe in the finals of the 2015 K-1 Super Bantamweight Grand Prix, on April 19, 2015. He became the K-1 Featherweight champion when he defeated Kaito Ozawa in the finals of the 2016 K-1 Featherweight Grand Prix, on November 3, 2016, thus becoming the first two-weight champion in K-1 history. He further became the K-1 Super Featherweight champion after defeating Kosuke Komiyama in the finals of the 2018 K-1 Super Featherweight Grand Prix, on March 21, 2018, thus becoming the first and only three weight champion in K-1 history.

Segawa was ranked as a top ten pound for pound kickboxer by Combat Press from June 2015 until October 2022, when he took an extended break to heal a number of injuries, and was ranked as the best pound for pound kickboxer from June 2019 until July 2022. Combat Press ranked him as the best flyweight and later the best bantamweight in their divisional rankings as well.

Segawa most recently competed in ONE Championship, and is one of only two men to have knocked out Rodtang Jitmuangnon.

== Personal life and background ==
Born on July 29, 1991, Takeru was named after Yamato Takeru by his father, who was an avid amateur historian. As a child, Takeru was a fan of both pro-wrestling and kickboxing. He was inspired to pursue kickboxing as a professional career after seeing Andy Hug win the 1996 K-1 Grand Prix and began training karate in the second grade of primary school. Because he loved children and also dreamed of becoming a preschool teacher at one point, Takeru enrolled in a high school that had a boxing club and offered a preschool teaching certification program; however, due to disciplinary issues, he was expelled after three months.

After his expulsion, in 2008, Takeru used his earnings that he had saved from his part-time jobs to travel to Thailand by himself, where he trained striking full-time and competed in various amateur tournaments to gain experience. To compete in the K-1 Koushien tournament, which was only open to high school students, Takeru re-enrolled in a correspondence high school.

In 2009, Takeru fulfilled his long-held dream of competing in K-1 Koushien, but was eliminated in the second round of the Kansai regional qualifiers. Overcome with frustration, he tearfully pleaded with Kensaku Maeda, who was sitting in the headquarters booth, saying, "I’m not this weak. I want to get stronger." Maeda encouraged him to join “Team Dragon,” saying he could become stronger there.

In 2010, Takeru held multiple part-time jobs again to save money for his eventual relocation to Tokyo, where he began training at “Team Dragon” under Kensaku Maeda immediately after graduating from high school.

Takeru has two siblings, an older and younger sister. On July 28, 2025, Takeru married his long-time partner and actress, Aoi Kawaguchi, in Japan.

== Fighting style ==
Takeru is notable for using a high volume and variety of front leg kicks. He makes use of the lead leg push kicks and snap kicks. True to his karate background, he uses the lead leg round and triangle kick as well, which he will throw should his opponent circle to the left. Alongside these, he uses the lead leg head kick. To transfer power into his lead leg, however, Takeru must first place his rear leg underneath his center of gravity, which leaves him exposed on one leg, squared and without an option to retreat, should his lead leg kick be deflected or round kick blocked. To adjust to this when fighting southpaws, he sticks to step up lead leg low kicks and rear leg knees.

The lead leg attack do not merely serve to score points, or debilitate and exhaust opponents, but to push the opponent to the ropes. His main strikes, once the opponent is backed up, are the right hook to the body and the stepping right knee. He'll combine the right hook with the left hook to the head, or combine a right-left to the body. Due to his ability to strike with the lead leg, he'll often use it to feint a kick, before placing his leg down on the mat and throwing power strikes.

== Kickboxing career ==
=== Early career ===
Takeru made his professional debut at KAKUMEI NAGOYA 3 ～, when he was scheduled to fight Bonta. He won the fight by a unanimous decision.

His next kickboxing bout came two years after his first one. He was scheduled to make his promotional appearance with K-1 at Krush 12, when he was set to face Hirofumi Kamata. He won the fight by a technical knockout, managing to knock Kamata down three times inside of the second round.

Takeru was scheduled to fight Katsumi Masuda at Krush-EX 2011 Final. Takeru dominated Kamata through all three rounds, with Kamata spending the entire fight on the defensive. Takeru won the fight by unanimous decision, with two judges scoring the bout 30-27 in his favor and the last judge scoring it 30-26 in his favor.

Takeru was scheduled to fight Kazuki Tanaka at Krush 17. He won the fight by a late second-round knockout. Takeru extended his six-fight winning streak with a first-round body-shot knockout of Masanori Shimada.

Takeru was scheduled to fight Yuki Kyotani at Krush 19. Kyotani managed to knock down Takeru in the first round, and kept him staggered throughout the rest of it. The referee called in the ringside doctor at the end of the round, who stopped the fight, as Takeru had suffered a broken nose. It would prove to be Takeru's only loss in over a decade and a half.

Takeru was scheduled to fight Masato Yuki at Krush YOUTH GP. He won the fight by unanimous decision, winning all three rounds of the bout. He would go on to win his next two fights by stoppage, knocking Yuya Suzuki out with a right hook at Krush-EX 2012 vol.5 and Katsuki Sakaki with a right cross at Krush 25.

=== Krush Featherweight champion ===
==== Krush Featherweight tournament ====
His 9-1 kickboxing record earned him a place in the Krush Featherweight tournament, being scheduled to fight the quarterfinal bout against Kenta Yagami at Krush 26. Takeru won the fight by a counter right hook knockout in the first round. Advancing to the semifinals, Takeru faced the two-time Kyokushin karate world champion Yuzo Suzuki at Krush 27. Takeru won the fight by unanimous decision, winning two of the three rounds on the judges scorecards. He advanced to the finals, where he faced the former ISKA, RISE and AJKF champion Nobuchika Terado. Takeru won the fight by unanimous decision.

==== Krush Featherweight title reign ====
His first two post-tournament fights were non-title bouts. He was first scheduled to fight Lee Solbin at Krush 30. He spent the first round landing strikes to the body with knees and punches. Takeru continued landing to Solbin's body in the second round, which resulted in a body shot knockout, near the end of the round. For his second non-title bout, Takeru was scheduled to fight Katsuya Goto at Krush 35. Takeru won the fight by a second-round knockout.

For his first title defense, Takeru was scheduled to fight Shota Kanbe at Krush 39. After a close first round, Takeru managed to knock Kanbe down in the second round. Although he was not able to finish Kanbe, Takeru nonetheless won the fight by unanimous decision. Takeru was scheduled to make his second title defense against Yuzo Suzuki at Krush 44. He thoroughly dominated his opponent, knocking him down in both the first and second rounds. Takeru won the fight by a wide unanimous decision, with all three judges scoring the bout 30-25 in his favor.

Takeru was scheduled to fight a super-fight with the Krush Bantamweight champion Taiga Kawabe at K-1 World GP 2014 -65kg Championship Tournament. Takeru won the fight by a highlight reel spinning backfist, 13 seconds into the third round. In his post-fight speech, Takeru stated his wish to make kickboxing as big as football and baseball.

Takeru was scheduled to make his third and final title defense against Yuta Otaki at Krush 51. During the sole round of this high paced bout, Takeru managed to knock his opponent down twice, with Otaki finally verbally submitting 89 seconds into the fight.

=== K-1 Super Bantamweight champion ===
==== K-1 Super Bantamweight Grand Prix ====
Takeru was scheduled to participate in the 2015 K-1 Super Bantamweight World Grand Prix, held at K-1 World GP 2015 -55kg Championship Tournament on April 19, 2015. Takeru was scheduled to face Alexandre Prilip in the tournament quarterfinals, while the other three quarterfinal bouts were contested between Shota Takiya and Danial Williams, Nobuchika Terado and Rui Botelho, as well as between Taiga Kawabe and Soufiane El Haji.

His quarter final bout with Prilip started tentatively, before Takeru upped the pressure towards the end of the second round and scored a knockdown with a right overhand. Takeru resumed pressuring in the second round, scoring the second knockdown midway through the second round with a combination of an uppercut, body shot, and low kick. The fight was stopped as Prilip was unable to beat the eight-count.

Advancing to the semifinals, Takeru faced the former two-time Krush Super Bantamweight champion Shota Takiya. Takeru made quick work of his opponent, scoring a knockdown with a combination of punches after just 30 seconds. The fight was stopped a minute later, as Takiya was unable to continue intelligently defending himself.

Takeru faced the reigning Krush Super Bantamweight champion Taiga Kawabe in the tournament finals. The fight was a rematch of their November 3, 2014 match, which Takeru won by a third-round knockout. Takeru knocked his opponent down twice in their second meeting: the first knockdown as a result of a knee to the body in the first round, while the second knockdown was a result of a right hook in the third round. Although he was unable to finish Taiga, Takeru won the fight by a wide unanimous decision. Two of the three judges scored the bout 30-25 for Takeru, while the third judges scored it 30-26 in his favor. Combat Press would later name this fight as their 2015 "Fight of the Year".

==== Takeru vs. Hamech ====
In his first appearance as a K-1 champion, Takeru was scheduled to fight a non-title bout with the reigning WBC Muaythai World Super Bantamweight champion Hakim Hamech at K-1 World GP 2015 -70kg Championship Tournament on July 4, 2015. Following a close first round, Takeru began to take over the fight from the second round onward, scoring a knockdown with a left hook at the very end of the round. He was unable to finish Hamech, but did enough to win the fight by unanimous decision, with all three judges awarding him a 30-27 scorecard.

==== Takeru vs. Bongiovanni ====
Takeru was scheduled to make the first, and only, career defense of his Super Bantamweight title against Charles Bongiovanni at K-1 World GP 2015 The Championship on November 21, 2015. Biongiovanni had earned the right to challenge Takeru with a first-round knockout of Danial Williams in a title eliminator match, which was contested on September 22, 2015. Takeru suffered the first knockdown of the fight midway through the first round, as he was dropped with a straight. He rebounded in the second round, scoring a standing knockdown at the 1:18 minute mark. He scored two more knockdowns over the course of the following thirty seconds, which forced the referee to stop the bout.

Takeru was scheduled to fight Yang Ming at Rizin World Grand Prix 2015: Part 2 - Iza on December 31, 2015. It was his first fight outside of K-1 in over seven years. Takeru won the fight by a second-round knockout, dropping Ming with a right cross in the last seconds of the round.

==== Takeru vs. Yoadsenchai ====
Takeru was scheduled to fight another non-title bout against Yoadsenchai Sor.Sopit at K-1 World GP 2016 -60kg Japan Tournament on April 24, 2016. Takeru won the fight by a technical knockout, knocking Yoadsenchai down three times in the third round. He scored the first knockdown with a spinning backfist, the second with a right hook, while the third one was a standing knockdown, as Yoadsenchai was unable to defend himself. Yoadsenchai was furthermore give two yellow cards during the second round for catching kicks.

==== Takeru vs. Ozawa ====
Takeru was scheduled to fight his last fight as a super bantamweight against Kaito Ozawa at K-1 World GP 2016 -65kg World Tournament on June 24, 2016. The fight was a non-title bout, the same as his previous three. He won the fight by unanimous decision, winning two of the three rounds on two of the judges scorecards. The fight was held in front of a sold-out Yoyogi National Gymnasium, and was further watched by 880 000 live viewers over AbemaTV. It was, at the time, the most viewed sports program in AbemaTV history.

=== Featherweight career ===
==== K-1 Featherweight Grand Prix ====
After defeating Kaito Ozawa, Takeru vacated the K-1 super bantamweight title with the intention of participating in the upcoming K-1 Featherweight World Tournament, held on November 3, 2016. Takeru was scheduled to face Jamie Whelan in the tournament quarterfinals. The remaining quarterfinal pairings pitted Kaito Ozawa against Josh Tonna, Elias Mahmoudi against Ryuma Tobe and Yun Qi against Shota Kanbe.

Takeru won the quarterfinal bout by unanimous decision, with all three judges awarding him a 30-26 scorecard. He scored the sole knockdown of the fight in the second round, dropping Wheelan with a left hook. Advancing to the semifinals, Takeru faced Yun Qi. He knocked Qi out with a series of left-right hooks, near the end of the second round. In the tournament finals, Takeru fought a rematch with Kaito Ozawa. Takeru was more dominant in the rematch, scoring multiple knockdowns over Ozawa on route to a wide unanimous decision victory. All three of the judges scored the fight 30-25 for Takeru. He became the first two weight champion in K-1 history.

Although he was initially scheduled to take part in a New Year's Eve RIZIN event, Takeru was not medically cleared. It was later revealed that he had suffered a hand injury during his fight with Yun Qi, and would take time off from competition to heal.

==== K-1 Featherweight title reign ====
Takeru was scheduled to make his return to competition against Victor Saravia at K-1 World GP 2017 Super Bantamweight Championship Tournament. Takeru won the fight by a third-round knockout, dropping Saravia with a right straight, followed by a left hook. Takeru was afterwards scheduled to fight Buvaisar Paskhaev, in another non-title bout, at K-1 World GP 2017 Super Welterweight Championship Tournament. He knocked Paskhaev out with a combination of body shots, midway through the third round.

Takeru was scheduled to make his first and only featherweight title defense against Wang Junguang at K-1 World GP 2017 Welterweight Championship Tournament. Takeru won the closely contested affair by unanimous decision. Two of the judges scored the fight 30-29 for Takeru, while the last one scored it 30-28 in his favor.

=== Super Featherweight career ===
==== Super Featherweight Grand Prix ====
After his successful title defense against Junguang, Takeru vacated the featherweight title and moved up in weight to challenge for the K-1 Super Featherweight title, held at the time by Taiga Kawabe. However, due to contractual problems between K-1 and Taiga's TRY HARD GYM, the bout was later scrapped. As the title was left vacant with Taiga's departure from K-1, the organization decided to organize a tournament to determine the new champion. Takeru was scheduled to fight Stavros Exakoustidis in the tournament quarterfinals.

Takeru won the quarterfinal bout against Exakoustidis by a unanimous decision, with two of the judges awarding him a 30-28 scorecard, while the third judge scored the fight 29-28 in his favor. Near the end of the third round, Takeru staggered Exakoustidis, although he was unable to knock him down. Advancing to the semifinals, Takeru faced Masanobu Goshu. He won the fight by knockout, two and half minutes into the first round, after landing a right straight off of a step-up knee feint. Goshu was unable to beat the eight-count. Takeru met Kosuke Komiyama in the tournament finals. He won the fight by a third-round technical knockout, knocking Komiyama three times in the third round. The first knockdown came as a result of two body shots, the second knockdown as a result of a right hook, while the third and final knockdown came as a result of a right straight. Takeru became the first kickboxer in K-1 history to hold belts across three different weight classes.

==== Takeru vs. Gallardo ====
Takeru was scheduled to fight the two-time ISKA World champion, and the 2018 WLF tournament winner, Daniel Puertas Gallardo at K-1 World GP 2018: inaugural Cruiserweight Championship Tournament. Mid-way through the first round, Takeru scored the first knockdown of the fight, hitting Gallardo with a right overhand off of a front kick feint. Pressuring after the fight resumed, Takeru knocked Gallardo out with a combination of hooks with 52 seconds left in the first round.

==== Takeru vs. Kouzi ====
During the post-fight press conference, Takeru stated that he was open to defending his K-1 title against Koji. Koji had first called out Takeru following the latter's Super Featherweight Grand Prix victory, calling for a December title fight. Takeru was scheduled to fight Koji, for the K-1 Super Featherweight title, at K-1 World GP 2018: K-1 Lightweight World's Best Tournament.The fight was held inside of a sold-out Edion Arena Osaka, with 8,000 spectators watching the fight. Takeru completely dominated his opponent, winning a wide unanimous decision, with all three judges scoring the bout 30-25 in his favor.

==== Takeru vs. Yodkitsada ====
Takeru was scheduled to fight the 2019 Rajadamnern Stadium featherweight champion Yodkitsada Yuthachonburi, in the main event of K-1 World GP 2019: K’FESTA 2. Takeru won the fight by a second-round knockout. With 30 seconds left in the second round, Takeru countered Yodkitsada's linear blitz with a right straight, which resulted in a knockdown. Immediately after the fight restarted, Takeru pressured with a combination of right and left hooks, resulting in a knockout, with 19 seconds remaining in the round. During the fight with Yodkitsada, Takeru suffered a tendon rupture in his right hand, which required surgery. Following the surgery, Takeru stated it would take him at least six months to recover from the operation.

==== Takeru vs. Murakoshi ====
During a K-1 press conference, held at the Edmont Metropolitan Hotel on September 20, 2019, it was announced that Takeru would fight the former RISE Bantamweight and K-1 Featherweight champion Yuta Murakoshi at K-1 World GP 2019 Yokohamatsuri. The fight was scheduled as the co-main event, with the final of the K-1 Featherweight Grand Prix serving as the event headliner. This was the first event that K-1 had held in Yokohama in its newer history. Takeru, Kenta Hayashi and Haruma Saikyo were the three fighters chosen to meet with the prefecture governor Yuji Kuroiwa. Takeru had a lukewarm start to the fight, being unable to successfully pressure the outfighting Murakoshi. His output increased in the second half of the third round, which was reflected in the scorecards, with two of three judges scoring the fight 30-29 in Takeru's favor and the third judge scoring the bout as a draw.

==== Takeru vs. Petchdam ====
Takeru was scheduled to fight Adam Bouarourou at K-1: K’Festa 3. The fight was scheduled as a double title fight, with both Takeru's K-1 and Bouarourou's ISKA title being on the line. The fight was later cancelled, as the Japanese government imposed travel restrictions to stop the spread of COVID-19, from March 31 to April 30. Accordingly, Takeru was rescheduled to fight the former BBTV Featherweight champion Petchdam Petchkiatpetch, who took the fight on a four days notice. Takeru dominated the bout, managing to knock his opponent down with a right straight near the end of the first round. Takeru continued to pressure as the fight resumed, knocking Petchdam out with a right hook, 49 seconds into the second round.

==== Takeru vs. Pettas ====
Takeru was scheduled to fight the reigning Krush Super Featherweight champion Leona Pettas at K-1 World GP 2020 in Fukuoka. Due to his stature, being 10 cm taller than Takeru, and his impressive nine fight winning streak, Pettas was considered to be the toughest challenge in Takeru's recent career. At the time of the bouts scheduling, Takeru was considered the #1 and Pettas the #3 ranked kickboxer in the world under 60 kg. Prior to his title defense, Takeru fought an exhibition match with Kizaemon Saiga, which ended in a pre-determined draw. On October 9, 2020, it was revealed that the fight was postponed, as Takeru had suffered a fracture in his left hand during training, which would require surgery.

The fight was rescheduled for January 24, 2021. However, on January 7, 2021, the Japanese government declared a state of emergency due to the COVID-19 pandemic, which forced K-1 to postpone the fight. The fight was rescheduled for K-1: K’Festa 4. The fight was postponed for the third time, as another state of emergency was declared due to the COVID-19 pandemic. The fight was rescheduled for K-1 World GP 2021: K’Festa 4 Day.2. The fourth time that the bout was scheduled, Takeru and Pettas were considered the #1 and #2 kickboxers in the world under 60 kg, respectively.

The fight started out evenly, with Pettas utilizing his reach advantage to score points from the outside, while Takeru attempted to cut off the ring and pressure. Half-way through the first round, Takeru landed an inadvertent groin strike, which resulted in a break. After the break, Takeru proved more successful, managing to knock Pettas down with a left hook near the end of the round. His pressure intensified in the second round, and he scored a knockout with a combination of punches 70 seconds into the round.

Takeru later revealed he had come into the fight without allowing his hand to fully heal, and had re-injured his hand during the fight.

==== Takeru vs. Nasukawa ====
Tenshin Nasukawa had been calling out Segawa since June 8, 2015. But due to contractual obligations, both fighters were not able to meet in the ring. At that time, K-1 and RISE were in a "Kickboxing Cold War" since 2010. On August 5, 2015, Segawa told the media that he is interested in fighting Nasukawa if K-1 can organize it. K-1 Japan group producer, Mitsuru Miyata, demanded that Nasukawa sign an exclusive contract with K-1 to be able to make the fight happen.

On November 21, 2015, Segawa made his first defense of his K-1 -55 kg world title against Charles Bongiovanni, he won the fight by TKO. After the match, during the in-ring interview, Segawa announced his desire to fight in Rizin, two weeks after Nasukawa announced the same. When Segawa returned backstage, Nasukawa approached him and demanded the fight. The fight can happen in Rizin even with the RISE and K-1 cold war. During the press conference, Segawa mentioned that he did not recognize Nasukawa and could not understand what he was saying due to the crowd noise and thought he was just a fan. Segawa confirmed that he is willing to accept the fight if offered. After the event, Nasukawa tweeted that Segawa agreed to fight him on New Year's Eve.

On December 8, 2015, Rizin announced a fight between Segawa and Chinese fighter, Yang Ming, for their New Year's Eve event. At the press conference, Rizin president, Sakakibara, acknowledged requests to make a Segawa vs. Nasukawa fight, however, he said there was not enough time to promote the fight and promised to try to make it happen in 2016.

On June 18, 2017, after Segawa knocked out Buvaisar Paskhaev, K-1 commentator, Masato, expressed his desire to see Segawa fight Nasukawa but the two other commentators ignored his comments. Two days later, K-1's official YouTube channel uploaded the full fight video of Segawa and Paskhaev but a few hours later it was deleted and re-uploaded without Masato's comments.

On August 29, 2017 Rizin executive Nobuhiko Takada said on Twitter "Two of the biggest superstars of kickboxing, Takeru vs Tenshin Nasukawa should be made right now! If this super-fight will not happen due to the (sic) cold war, it is heinous crime! Let's make this! Make miracle!" A few hours later a K-1 broadcaster trolled Takada on Twitter. A few days later, Takada apologized and promised to never talk about a fighter from another organization ever again and deleted every tweet he had about Nasukawa vs Segawa.

On December 31, 2017, Nasukawa won Rizin's Kickboxing -57 kg tournament. In an attempt to quash the cold war and influence K-1 and RISE to make the Segawa fight, Nasukawa made sure the show was being broadcast live so Rizin was not able to cut any of his comments. Post-fight, in the ring, Nasukawa engaged the crowd by asking who they want him to fight next and the crowd screamed Segawa's name. In February 2018, M-1 Sports Media, which operates K-1, filed a lawsuit against Tenshin, his father Hiroyuki, RISE president Takashi Ito and Rizin president Sakakibara. According to the lawsuit, it all started three years ago when Nasukawa called out Segawa to fight. More recently during Rizin's New Year's Eve event when Nasukawa asked the audience who they want him to fight next. They claim that it is an unfair business practice to involve another fighter's name from a different organization.

On March 16, 2018, RISE president Takashi Ito, former K-1 fighter Hiroya and his lawyer, accused K-1 Japan Group's exclusive contract, illegal based on the competition law. Hiroya's lawyer told the media, that according to K-1's contract not fighting for a year causes the contract to expire. Every fight under contract to the organization, extends the fighter's contract for another year from that fight, and the only way to get out of the contract is not get paid for a year. Hiroya cites this as the reason why Segawa could not fight Nasukawa as he knows Segawa as a friend and will not back down to a fight.

At a press conference held on December 24, 2021, Rizin FF president Nobuyuki Sakakibara announced that Takeru would fight Tenshin Nasukawa in a neutral venue in June 2022, in what was Nasukawa's last professional bout as a kickboxer. The fight was scheduled to take place at 58 kilograms, while both fighters had to weigh less than 62 kilograms on fight day. At the time of the fight's scheduling, Takeru and Nasukawa were considered to be the best pound for pound kickboxers in the world, excepting Superbon Banchamek. On April 1, 2022 the bout was confirmed to happen on June 19, 2022 at the Tokyo Dome, marking the return of a kickboxing headlined event to the venue for the first time since 2006. The rules for the bout were announced six days later: it was to be contested across three three-minute rounds, under the RISE ruleset, with one additional round in case of a draw. The entire event was broadcast by Abema TV as a pay per view, while a two hour portion (which included Takeru's bout with Nasukawa) was also broadcast by Fuji TV. On May 31 it was revealed that Fuji TV had opted out of broadcasting the bout, due to allegations that RIZIN president Sakakibara was dealing with the yakuza.

In front of a sold-out audience of 56,399 at the Tokyo Dome, Takeru lost the fight by decision. Immediately before the end of the opening round, Nasukawa was able to knock Takeru down with a sharp left hook counter to his right straight, which resulted in all five judges scoring the round 10–8 in his favor. The second round was more even, with four judges scoring it an even 10–10 draw, while the fifth judge scored it 10–9 for Tenshin. Following the third and final round, the judges awarded a unanimous decision to Nasukawa, with total scores of 29–28, 30–28, 30–28, 30–28 and 30–27. The event sold around 500,000 PPVs.

==== Free agent ====
On June 27, 2022 K-1 held a press conference at which Takeru announced he was taking a break from competition in order to heal physically and mentally. He revealed he had been suffering from various injuries including spondylolisthesis and damage to his MCL and ACL. He also revealed he had been struggling with depression and panic disorder. He announced that he would pursue a new goal once healed without precising a timeframe. He subsequently relinquished his K-1 Super Featherweight title.

On August 4, 2022, Takeru underwent right hand surgery, in order to repair the tendons in his middle finger. On the same day, Takeru announced over social media that he would also operate his knee during the next few weeks, to heal damage in the ACL and MCL ligaments. He successfully underwent knee surgery on August 19. On November 1, 2022, Takeru announced on his social media that his contract with K-1 had expired in the end of October, making him a free agent. Takeru made his first post-surgery professional appearance on November 6, 2022, as he faced former teammate Koki in an exhibition bout at a GAINA promoted event in his native Yonago. The fight ended in a pre-determined draw.

During a joint press conference held by Takeru and Abema TV on March 29, 2023, it was announced that Takeru would face Glory veteran Bailey Sugden for the vacant ISKA K-1 Rules World Lightweight (−61 kg) title at MTGP Impact in Paris on June 24, 2023. At the same press conference, it was furthermore revealed that Takeru had signed an exclusive contract with Abema and would earn around $750,000 per fight from the live TV streaming website. Takeru stopped Sugden with a head kick near the end of the fifth round to capture the vacant championship.

=== ONE Championship ===
ONE Championship CEO Chatri Sityodtong announced of April 28, 2023, that Takeru had signed a contract with the promotion, although the exact details of it remained unclear.

In the promotional debut, Takeru was scheduled to face Rodtang Jitmuangnon in a kickboxing superfight on January 28, 2024, at ONE 165. However, Rodtang withdrew from the bout due to injury and was replaced by Superlek Kiatmuu9 for the ONE Flyweight Kickboxing World Championship bout. Takeru lost the fight by unanimous decision.

Takeru was expected to face Black Panther VenumMuayThai, who was making his kickboxing debut, at ONE Friday Fights 81 on September 27, 2024. Black Panther withdrew with an injury on September 6 and was replaced by Thant Zin. Despite being knocked down in the opening round, Takeru was nonetheless able to win the fight by a second-round knockout.

The match between Takeru and Rodtang Jitmuangnon in a kickboxing superfight was rescheduled on March 23, 2025, at ONE 172. He lost the fight via knockout in round one. His teammate Masaaki Noiri later revealed Takeru entered the bout with rib and sternum fractures.

Takeru faced Denis Puric at ONE 173 on November 16, 2025. He won the fight by a second-round technical knockout. Takeru announced that he would retire from the sport of kickboxing after the next match. He asked Rodtang to face him in his final match and Rodtang accepted the rematch. At ONE SAMURAI 1 on April 29, 2026, Takeru won the ONE Interim Flyweight Kickboxing World Championship by dominating the rematch, knocking down Rodtang twice in the 2nd round and brutally dropping him twice more in the 5th round as the referee stepped in to declare a TKO victory for Takeru, handing Rodtang his first knockout loss in almost 13 years since losing to Sangtien Sor.Sornsing via a fourth-round elbow KO in October 2013. For this final victory in his professional career, Takeru was awarded a US$100,000 performance bonus.

On May 1, 2026, Takeru held a retirement press conference in Tokyo and revealed that the reason for his decision to retire from active competition was a disc herniation in his neck that he had developed a year earlier.

== Championships and accomplishments ==
=== Professional ===
- Krush
  - 2013 Krush Featherweight Championship
    - Three successful title defenses
- K-1
  - 2015 K-1 World GP Super Bantamweight World Grand Prix Winner
  - 2015 K-1 Super Bantamweight Championship
    - One successful title defense
  - 2016 K-1 World GP Featherweight World Grand Prix Winner
  - 2016 K-1 Featherweight Championship
    - One successful title defense
  - 2018 K-1 World GP Super Featherweight World Grand Prix Winner
  - 2018 K-1 Super Featherweight Championship
    - Two successful title defenses
- International Sport Karate Association
  - 2023 ISKA K-1 World Lightweight (-61 kg) Championship
- Kickboxing Grand Prix
  - 2023 KGP K-1 World Lightweight (-61 kg) Championship
- ONE Championship
  - 2026 Interim ONE Flyweight (135 lbs) Kickboxing World Champion

=== Amateur ===
- Shin Karate
  - 2010 Shin Karate 114th & 115th K-2 Tournament Lightweight Winner
  - 2011 Shin Karate 116th K-2 Tournament Lightweight Winner
  - 2011 Shin Karate 22nd All Japan K-2 Grand Prix BUDO-RA Award

=== Awards ===
- ONE Championship
  - 2024: Fight of the Year vs. (Superlek Kiatmuu9)
  - 2025 Victoria Lee Award
- K-1 Awards
  - 2017 Fight of the Year (vs Victor Saravia)
  - 2018 Fighter of the Year
  - 2019 Fight of the Year (vs Yodkitsada Yuthachonburi)
  - 2020 Knockout of the Year (vs Petchdam Petchkiatpetch)
  - 2021 Fight of the Year (vs. Leona Pettas)
- CombatPress.com
  - 2015 Fight of the Year (vs. Taiga)
  - 2018 Male Fighter of the Year
- eFight.jp
  - Fighter of the Month (May 2013, April 2015, November 2016 and March 2018)

== Fight record ==
Professional Kickboxing & Muay Thai Record
46 Wins (28 (T)KO's), 5 Losses, 0 Draw, 0 No Contest
Date	Result	Opponent	Event	Location	Method	Round	Time
2026-04-29	Win	(Thailand) Rodtang Jitmuangnon	ONE Samurai 1	Tokyo, Japan	TKO (Punches)	5	2:22
Won the interim ONE Flyweight Kickboxing World Championship.
2025-11-16	Win	(Bosnia and Herzegovina) Denis Purić	ONE 173	Tokyo, Japan	TKO (Punches)	2	2:49
2025-03-23	Loss	(Thailand) Rodtang Jitmuangnon	ONE 172	Saitama, Japan	KO (Left hook)	1	1:20
2024-09-27	Win	(Myanmar) Thant Zin	ONE Friday Fights 81	Bangkok, Thailand	KO (Stab kick and punches)	2	2:47
2024-01-28	Loss	(Thailand) Superlek Kiatmuu9	ONE 165	Tokyo, Japan	Decision (Unanimous)	5	3:00
For the ONE Flyweight Kickboxing World Championship.
2023-06-24	Win	(United Kingdom) Bailey Sugden	MTGP Impact in Paris	Paris, France	KO (Head kick)	5	2:58
Wins the vacant ISKA and KGP K-1 World Lightweight (-61kg) titles.
2022-06-19	Loss	(Japan) Tenshin Nasukawa	THE MATCH 2022	Tokyo, Japan	Decision (Unanimous)	3	3:00
2021-03-28	Win	(Japan) Leona Pettas	K-1 World GP 2021: K’Festa 4 Day.2	Tokyo, Japan	KO (Punches)	2	1:10
Defended the K-1 World Super Featherweight (-60kg) title.
2020-03-22	Win	(Thailand) Petchdam Petchkiatpetch	K-1: K’Festa 3	Saitama, Japan	KO (Punches)	2	0:49
2019-11-24	Win	(Japan) Yuta Murakoshi	K-1 World GP 2019 Yokohamatsuri	Yokohama, Japan	Decision (Majority)	3	3:00
2019-03-10	Win	(Thailand) Yodkitsada Yuthachonburi	K-1 World GP 2019: K’FESTA 2	Saitama, Japan	KO (Right Hook)	2	2:41
2018-12-08	Win	(Japan) Kouzi	K-1 World GP 2018: K-1 Lightweight World's Best Tournament	Osaka, Japan	Decision (Unanimous)	3	3:00
Defended the K-1 World Super Featherweight (-60kg) title.
2018-09-24	Win	(Spain) Daniel Puertas Gallardo	K-1 World GP 2018: inaugural Cruiserweight Championship Tournament	Saitama, Japan	KO (Punches)	1	2:08
2018-03-21	Win	(Japan) Kosuke Komiyama	K-1 World GP 2018: K'FESTA.1 -60 kg World Tournament, Final	Saitama, Japan	TKO (3 Knockdowns)	3	2:01
Wins the 2018 K-1 World GP Super Featherweight (-60kg) Tournament.
2018-03-21	Win	(Japan) Masanobu Goshu	K-1 World GP 2018: K'FESTA.1 -60 kg World Tournament, Semi Finals	Saitama, Japan	KO (Punches)	1	2:25
2018-03-21	Win	(Greece) Stavros Exakoustidis	K-1 World GP 2018: K'FESTA.1 -60 kg World Tournament, Quarter Finals	Saitama, Japan	Decision (Unanimous)	3	3:00
2017-09-18	Win	(China) Wang Junguang	K-1 World GP 2017 Welterweight Championship Tournament	Tokyo, Japan	Decision (Unanimous)	3	3:00
Defended the K-1 World Featherweight (-57.5kg) title.
2017-06-18	Win	(Russia) Buvaisar Paskhaev	K-1 World GP 2017 Super Welterweight Championship Tournament	Tokyo, Japan	KO (Body Punches)	3	1:17
2017-04-22	Win	(United States) Victor Saravia	K-1 World GP 2017 Super Bantamweight Championship Tournament	Tokyo, Japan	KO (Left Hook)	3	2:20
2016-11-03	Win	(Japan) Kaito Ozawa	K-1 World GP 2016 Featherweight World Tournament, Final	Tokyo, Japan	Decision (Unanimous)	3	3:00
Wins the 2016 K-1 World GP Featherweight (-57.5kg) Tournament.
2016-11-03	Win	(China) Yun Qi	K-1 World GP 2016 Featherweight World Tournament, Semi Finals	Tokyo, Japan	KO (Right Cross)	2	2:31
2016-11-03	Win	(United Kingdom) Jamie Whelan	K-1 World GP 2016 Featherweight World Tournament, Quarter Finals	Tokyo, Japan	Decision (Unanimous)	3	3:00
2016-06-24	Win	(Japan) Kaito Ozawa	K-1 World GP 2016 -65kg World Tournament	Tokyo, Japan	Decision (Unanimous)	3	3:00
2016-04-24	Win	(Thailand) Yodsaenchai Sor.Sopit	K-1 World GP 2016 -60kg Japan Tournament	Tokyo, Japan	TKO (3 Knockdowns)	3	0:47
2015-12-31	Win	(China) Yang Ming	Rizin World Grand Prix 2015: Part 2 - Iza	Saitama, Japan	KO (Right cross)	2	2:59
2015-11-21	Win	(France) Charles Bongiovanni	K-1 World GP 2015 The Championship	Tokyo, Japan	TKO (3 Knockdowns)	2	2:16
Defended the K-1 World Super Bantamweight (-55kg) title.
2015-07-04	Win	(France) Hakim Hamech	K-1 World GP 2015 -70kg Championship Tournament	Tokyo, Japan	Decision (Unanimous)	3	3:00
2015-04-19	Win	(Japan) Taiga	K-1 World GP 2015 -55kg Championship Tournament, Final	Tokyo, Japan	Decision (Unanimous)	3	3:00
Wins the 2015 K-1 World GP Super Bantamweight (-55kg) Tournament.
2015-04-19	Win	(Japan) Shota Takiya	K-1 World GP 2015 -55kg Championship Tournament, Semi Finals	Tokyo, Japan	TKO (Referee stoppage)	1	1:31
2015-04-19	Win	(Russia) Alexandre Prilip	K-1 World GP 2015 -55kg Championship Tournament, Quarter Finals	Tokyo, Japan	KO (Body shot)	2	1:47
2015-02-06	Win	(Japan) Yuta Otaki	Krush.51	Tokyo, Japan	Decision (Unanimous)	3	3:00
Defended the Krush Featherweight Belt
2014-11-03	Win	(Japan) Taiga	K-1 World GP 2014 -65kg Championship Tournament	Tokyo, Japan	KO (Spinning Back Fist)	3	0:13
2014-08-09	Win	(Japan) Yuzo Suzuki	Krush.44	Tokyo, Japan	Decision (Unanimous)	3	3:00
Defended the Krush Featherweight Belt
2014-03-08	Win	(Japan) Shota Kanbe	Krush.39	Tokyo, Japan	Decision (Unanimous)	3	3:00
Defended the Krush Featherweight Belt
2013-12-14	Win	(Japan) Katsuya Goto	Krush.35	Tokyo, Japan	KO (Right Cross)	1	2:33
2013-08-11	Win	(South Korea) Lee Solbin	Krush.30	Tokyo, Japan	KO (Left Hook to the Body)	2	2:11
2013-05-12	Win	(Japan) Nobuchika Terado	Krush.28 –58 kg Tournament Final	Tokyo, Japan	Decision (Unanimous)	3	3:00
Wins the Krush Featherweight Belt
2013-03-20	Win	(Japan) Yuzo Suzuki	Krush.27 –58 kg Tournament Semi Finals	Tokyo, Japan	Decision (Unanimous)	3	3:00
2013-01-26	Win	(Japan) Kenta Yagami	Krush.26 –58 kg Tournament Quarter Finals	Tokyo, Japan	KO (Straight right)	1	2:21
2012-12-14	Win	(Japan) Katsuki Sakaki	Krush.25	Tokyo, Japan	KO (Right Cross)	1	1:43
2012-10-21	Win	(Japan) Yuya Suzuki	Krush-EX 2012 vol.5	Tokyo, Japan	KO (Right Hook)	2	2:58
2012-09-09	Win	(Japan) Masato Yuki	Krush YOUTH GP	Tokyo, Japan	Decision (Unanimous)	3	3:00
2012-06-08	Loss	(Japan) Yuki Kyotani	Krush.19	Tokyo, Japan	TKO (Doctor stop/Broken nose)	1	3:00
2012-05-03	Win	(Japan) Masanori Shimada	Krush.18	Tokyo, Japan	KO (Left Hook to the Body)	1	2:03
2012-03-17	Win	(Japan) Kazuki Tanaka	Krush.17	Tokyo, Japan	KO (Punches)	2	2:54
2012-01-09	Win	(Japan) Kazunori	Krush.15	Tokyo, Japan	KO (Right Cross)	1	2:58
2011-12-10	Win	(Japan) Katsumi Masuda	Krush-EX 2011 Final	Tokyo, Japan	Decision (Unanimous)	3	3:00
2011-09-24	Win	(Japan) Hirofumi Kamata	Krush.12	Tokyo, Japan	KO (3 Knockdowns)	2	2:17
2010-02-14	Win	(Thailand)	Sityodtong International Stadium	Pattaya, Thailand	Decision	3	3:00
2009-08-30	Win	(Japan) Bonta	KAKUMEI NAGOYA 3 ～ Todoke! Ai to Yuuki to Low kick ～	Nagoya, Japan	Decision (Unanimous)	3	3:00
2008-12-15	Loss	(Thailand) Eksiam Mor.KrungthepThonburi	Rajadamnern Stadium	Bangkok, Thailand	Decision	5	3:00
Legend: Win Loss Draw/No contest Notes

Amateur Kickboxing Record (Incomplete)
13 Wins (2 KO's), 1 Loss, 1 Draw
Date	Result	Opponent	Event	Location	Method	Round	Time
2010-03-29	Win	(Japan) Masashi Kodama	KAKUMEI 1st San'in Amateur Kickboxing Championship	San'in region, Japan	Decision		
2010-03-21	Win	(Japan)		Japan	Decision	2	
2009-11-28	Win	(Japan)		Japan	Decision	2	
2009-06-14	Loss	(Japan) Hiroto Yamaguchi	K-1 Koshien 2009 Kansai Area Elimination Tournament Second Round	Saitama, Japan	Decision (Unanimous)	1	2:00
2009-06-14	Win	(Japan)	K-1 Koshien 2009 Kansai Area Elimination Tournament First Round	Saitama, Japan	KO	1	
2009-02-01	Win	(Japan)		Osaka, Japan	KO	3	
2008-09-28	Draw	(Japan) Garo Kawano	3rd Chugoku Amateur Kickboxing Championship	Hiroshima, Japan	Decision		
2008-05-18	Win	(Japan) Asuki Nagai	KAKUMEI Challenge Kickboxing 15	Osaka, Japan	Decision	2	
2008-04-20	Win	(Japan)	KAKUMEI Kickboxing	Japan	Decision	2	
2007-09-09	Win	(Japan)		Hiroshima, Japan	Decision (Majority)	2	2:00
Legend: Win Loss Draw/No contest Notes

== See also ==
- List of male kickboxers
- List of Krush champions
- List of K-1 champions
