= Kenji Kubo =

Japanese kickboxer (born 1989)

- Born: 久保賢司; April 4, 1989 (age 37); Tachikawa, Tokyo, Japan
- Other names: KENJI
- Height: 168 cm (5 ft 6 in)
- Weight: 55 kg (121 lb; 8.7 st)
- Division: Flyweight
- Style: Kickboxing
- Stance: Orthodox
- Fighting out of: Tokyo, Japan
- Team: K-1 Gym Gotanda Team Kings; Unlimited; DC LAB．GYM
- Years active: 2006–present

Professional boxing record
- Total: 10
- Wins: 5
- By knockout: 2
- Losses: 4
- By knockout: 2
- Draws: 1

Kickboxing record
- Total: 30
- Wins: 23
- By knockout: 14
- Losses: 7

Other information
- Notable relatives: Yuta Kubo (brother)
- Boxing record from BoxRec

Kenji Kubo (born 4 April 1989), also known simply as KENJI, is a Japanese kickboxer and former professional boxer. He is the 2017 K-1 Super Bantamweight Grand Prix finalist, the 2011 RISE Bantamweight champion and the 2007 NJKF Flyweight champion.

== Kickboxing career ==
=== K-1 ===
Kubo returned to K-1 in 2017, and was immediately scheduled to take part in the 2017 K-1 Super Bantamweight Grand Prix. It was his first kickboxing bout in nearly five years. Kubo beat Suen Tak Chuen by an extra round unanimous decision in the quarterfinals, and Nobuchika Terado by a second-round knockout in the semifinals. Kubo fought Yoshiki Takei in the finals, and lost the fight by unanimous decision.

After he finished as the runner-up in the Super Bantamweight Grand Prix, Kubo was scheduled to fight a rematch with Nobuchika Terado for the Krush Super Bantamweight title, at Krush 82. The fight was declared a draw after three rounds, and went into an extra round, after which Terado won a unanimous decision.

Kubo was scheduled to fight a rematch with Yoshiki Takei for the K-1 Super Bantamweight title at K-1: K'FESTA.1. Takei won the fight by knockout midway through the first round.

== Titles and accomplishments ==
- K-1 World GP Japan
  - 2017 K-1 World GP Super Bantamweight Championship Tournament Runner-up
- RISE
  - 2011 RISE Bantamweight Champion
- New Japan Kickboxing Federation
  - 2007 NJKF Flyweight Champion
- World Professional Muaythai Federation
  - 2007 WPMO World Flyweight Champion

== Professional kickboxing record ==
Professional Kickboxing Record
23 Wins (14 (T)KO's), 7 Losses, 0 Draw, 0 No Contest
Date	Result	Opponent	Event	Location	Method	Round	Time
2018-03-21	Loss	(Japan) Yoshiki Takei	K-1 World GP 2018: K'FESTA.1	Saitama, Japan	KO (Right Hook)	1	1:27
For the K-1 -55kg title.
2017-11-05	Loss	(Japan) Nobuchika Terado	Krush.82	Tokyo, Japan	Ext.R Decision (Unanimous)	4	3:00
For the Krush Super Bantamweight title.
2017-04-22	Loss	(Japan) Yoshiki Takei	K-1 World GP 2017: Super Bantamweight Tournament, Final	Tokyo, Japan	Decision (Unanimous)	3	3:00
For the K-1 World GP 2017 -55kg World Tournament.
2017-04-22	Win	(Japan) Nobuchika Terado	K-1 World GP 2017: Super Bantamweight Tournament, Semi Finals	Tokyo, Japan	KO (Left Straight)	2	3:00
2017-04-22	Win	(Hong Kong) Suen Tak Chuen	K-1 World GP 2017: Super Bantamweight Tournament, Quarter Finals	Tokyo, Japan	Ext.R Decision (Unanimous)	4	3:00
2012-06-06	Win	(France) Franck Gross	RISE 88	Tokyo, Japan	KO (Left Hook to the Body)	3	0:29
2012-06-06	Win	(Japan) Mikihito Yamagami	RISE 87	Tokyo, Japan	Decision (Unanimous)	3	3:00
2012-01-29	Win	(Thailand) Pajonsuk Por.Pramuk	RISE 86	Tokyo, Japan	Decision (Unanimous)	3	3:00
2011-11-23	Win	(Japan) Dyki	RISE 85	Tokyo, Japan	KO (Left hook to the body)	1	1:35
Wins the vacant RISE Bantamweight title.
2011-09-23	Win	(Japan) Ryuma Tobe	RISE 83	Tokyo, Japan	Decision (Majority)	3	3:00
2011-08-21	Win	(Japan) Keiichita Matsumoto	Bigbang 6	Tokyo, Japan	KO (Left High Kick)	2	2:49
2011-05-27	Win	(Korea) Shin Jyu Oh	Survivor～Round.7～	Tokyo, Japan	TKO (Punches)	1	2:26
2011-04-30	Loss	(Japan) Shota Takiya	Krush Inaugural Championship Tournament ～Triple Final Round～Semi Final	Tokyo, Japan	Ext.R Decision (Unanimous)	4	3:00
2010-12-12	Win	(Japan) Kazuki Tanaka	Krush Inaugural Championship Tournament Quarter Final	Tokyo, Japan	KO (Left Hook)	2	0:55
2010-10-08	Win	(Japan) Hiroaki Mizuhara	Survivor 〜Round.5〜	Tokyo, Japan	Decision (Majority)	3	3:00
2010-07-18	Win	(Japan) Kentaro Kimura	Survivor 〜Round.4〜	Tokyo, Japan	Decision (Unanimous)	3	3:00
2010-05-27	Win	(Japan) Akitaka Sugiyama	Krush 7	Tokyo, Japan	KO (Left Hook)	1	2:34
2010-03-13	Loss	(Japan) Nobuchika Terado	Krush × Survivor	Tokyo, Japan	KO (Punches)	2	2:26
2010-01-25	Win	(Japan) Shin Yoshida	Survivor～Round.3～	Tokyo, Japan	KO (Right Cross)	1	1:40
2009-12-09	Loss	(Japan) Shota Takiya	Survivor～Round.2～	Tokyo, Japan	Decision (Majority)	3	3:00
2009-09-28	Win	(Japan) Taisuke Degai	Survivor～Round.1～	Tokyo, Japan	Decision (Split)	3	3:00
2008-05-14	Loss	(Thailand) Wanphet Phetputhon	Rajadamnern Stadium	Bangkok, Thailand	Decision	5	3:00
2007-11-21	Win	(Cambodia)		Phnom Penh, Cambodia	Decision		
2007-09-02	Win	(Korea) Lee Hi Do	NJKF FIGHTING EVOLUTION X	Tokyo, Japan	TKO (Towel thrown/Low Kick)	1	2:38
Wins vacant NJKF Flyweight title.
2007-07-13	Win	(Thailand) Nakbin Patong gym	Bangla Stadium	Patong, Thailand	KO (Elbow)	2	
Wins WPMO World Flyweight title.
2007-05-13	Win	(Japan) Yusuke Nakanishi	NJKF FIGHTING EVOLUTION VI	Tokyo, Japan	TKO (Doctor Stoppage)	3	2:49
2007-03-18	Win	(Japan) Daisuke	NJKF FIGHTING EVOLUTION III	Tokyo, Japan	KO (Low Kick)	2	3:00
2007-01-28	Win	(Thailand) Samingnum SKV gym	NJKF FIGHTING EVOLUTION II	Tokyo, Japan	KO	2	2:11
2006-11-23	Win	(Japan) Naoki Ootsuki	NJKF	Tokyo, Japan	TKO (Doctor Stoppage)	3	2:58
2006-09-17	Win	(Japan) Rose Tasuya	TRIAL LEAGUE.7	Tokyo, Japan	TKO (3 Knockdowns)	2	2:43
Legend: Win Loss Draw/No contest Notes

Amateur Kickboxing Record
Date	Result	Opponent	Event	Location	Method	Round	Time
2007-12-31	Loss	(Japan) Yudai	K-1 PREMIUM 2007 Dynamite!! K-1 Koshien Tournament Semi Final	Osaka, Japan	Decision (Unanimous)	3	3:00
Legend: Win Loss Draw/No contest Notes

== Professional boxing record ==
9 fights	5 wins	4 losses
By knockout	2	2
By decision	3	2

No.	Result	Record	Opponent	Type	Round, time	Date	Location	Notes
10	Loss	5–4–1	(Japan) Ryohei Takahashi	UD	8	21 August 2015	Korakuen Hall, Tokyo, Japan	
9	Loss	5–3–1	(Japan) Ryoichi Tamura	TKO	8 (8)	25 November 2014	Korakuen Hall, Tokyo, Japan	
8	Win	5–2–1	(Japan) Kota Sato	UD	8	10 September 2014	Korakuen Hall, Tokyo, Japan	
7	Win	4–2–1	(Japan) Atsushi Hosogai	TKO	7 (8)	30 April 2014	Korakuen Hall, Tokyo, Japan	
6	Draw	3–2–1	(Japan) Kota Sato	SD	8	11 January 2014	Korakuen Hall, Tokyo, Japan	
5	Win	3–2	(Japan) Taro Mochizuki	TKO	3 (6)	25 November 2013	Korakuen Hall, Tokyo, Japan	
4	Loss	2–2	(Japan) Yosuke Fujihara	SD	8	25 July 2013	Korakuen Hall, Tokyo, Japan	
3	Win	2–1	(Indonesia) Galih Susanto	UD	6	28 May 2013	Korakuen Hall, Tokyo, Japan	
2	Loss	1–1	(Philippines) Rey Megrino	TKO	3 (6)	29 January 2013	Korakuen Hall, Tokyo, Japan	
1	Win	1–0	(Japan) Noldi Manakane	UD	6	9 November 2012	Korakuen Hall, Tokyo, Japan	

== See also ==
- List of male kickboxers
