= Namito Izawa =

Japanese kickboxer

- Born: 伊澤 波人; July 15, 1992 (age 34); Kanagawa, Japan
- Nationality: Japanese
- Height: 170 cm (5 ft 7 in)
- Weight: 57.5 kg (127 lb; 9.05 st)
- Style: Karate
- Stance: Orthodox
- Fighting out of: Tokyo, Japan
- Team: K-1 Gym KREST; Team Dragon (former)

Kickboxing record
- Total: 45
- Wins: 32
- By knockout: 9
- Losses: 11
- Draws: 2

Namito Izawa is a Japanese kickboxer.

== Titles and accomplishments ==
Professional

- 2016 Hero Legends -57 kg Champion
- 2014 Hero Legends -57 kg World Tournament Champion

Amateur

- 2009 K-3 Grand Prix Lightweight Champion
- 2008 K-3 Grand Prix Lightweight Champion
- 2007 JIKA All Japan Middle School Champion

== Fight record ==
Professional Kickboxing Record
32 Wins (9 (T)KO's), 11 Losses, 2 Draws, 0 No Contest
Date	Result	Opponent	Event	Location	Method	Round	Time
2020-03-28	Loss	(Japan) Toma	Krush.112	Tokyo, Japan	TKO (3 Knockdowns/Punches)	1	2:48
2019-09-16	Win	(Japan) Naoki Takahashi	Krush.105	Tokyo, Japan	Ext.R Decision (Unanimous)	4	3:00
2019-04-19	Loss	(Japan) Tetsuji Noda	Krush 100	Tokyo, Japan	Decision (Unanimous)	3	3:00
2019-01-26	Win	(Japan) Kazumu	Krush 97	Tokyo, Japan	Decision (Unanimous)	3	3:00
2018-10-28	Win	(Japan) Takahiro	Krush 94	Tokyo, Japan	KO (Punches & Body knees)	3	1:23
2018-06-17	Win	(Japan) Kento Ito	K-1 World GP 2018: Featherweight Championship Tournament	Saitama, Japan	Decision (Unanimous)	3	3:00
2018-04-22	Win	(Japan) Shota Kanbe	Krush 87	Tokyo, Japan	Decision (Unanimous)	3	3:00
2017-09-18	Loss	(Japan) Yoshiki Takei	K-1 World GP 2017 Welterweight Championship Tournament	Saitama, Japan	KO (3 Knockdowns/Punches)	3	1:10
2017-06-25	Win	(China) Li Guangsong	Hero Legends	Guangdong, China	Ext.R Decision	4	3:00
2017-04-22	Win	(Japan) Yuya Suzuki	K-1 World GP 2017: Super Bantamweight Tournament Reserve Fight	Tokyo, Japan	Ext.R Decision (Split)	4	3:00
2017-01-15	Win	(Japan) Rasta	Krush.72	Tokyo, Japan	Decision (Unanimous)	3	3:00
2016-10-02	Win	(China) Zhuang Shusong	Hero Legends	Inner Mongolia, China	Decision (Unanimous)	3	3:00
Wins Hero Legends -57kg title.
2016-07-09	Win	(China) Wang Xing	Hero Legends	Beijing, China	KO (Low Kick)	2	
2016-04-10	Win	(Japan) Kazuyoshi	Krush.65	Tokyo, Japan	Decision (Majority)	3	3:00
2015-11-14	Loss	(Japan) Yuya Suzuki	Krush.60	Tokyo, Japan	Ext.R Decision (Unanimous)	4	3:00
2015-09-22	Win	(Japan) Satoshi Katashima	K-1 World GP 2015 Survival Wars	Tokyo, Japan	Ext.R Decision (Unanimous)	4	3:00
2015-06-26	Loss	(China) Zhuang Shusong	Hero Legends	China	Decision (Unanimous)	3	3:00
Lost Hero Legends -57kg title.
2015-01-04	Win	(Japan) Taio Asahisa	Krush.49	Tokyo, Japan	Ext.R Decision (Unanimous)	4	3:00
2014-11-09	Win	(Japan) Toma	Krush.47	Tokyo, Japan	Ext.R Decision (Unanimous)	4	3:00
2014-08-24	Win	(Japan) Shin Isobe	Krush.45	Nagoya, Japan	KO (Low Kicks)	3	2:02
2014-07-13	Win	(Japan) Ryuji Horio	Krush 43	Tokyo, Japan	Decision (Majority)	3	3:00
2014-05-17	Win	(Thailand) Takrudthong Or Unsuwan	Hero Legends -57 kg World Tournament, Final	Guangdong, China	KO	2	2:29
Wins Hero Legends -57kg World Tournament title.
2014-05-17	Win	(China) Zhuang Shusong	Hero Legends -57 kg World Tournament, Semi Final	Guangdong, China	Decision (Unanimous)	3	3:00
2014-03-16	Win	(Japan) Takaaki	Krush-EX 2014 vol.1	Tokyo, Japan	Decision (Unanimous)	3	3:00
2013-12-14	Loss	(Japan) Yuzo Suzuki	Krush 35	Tokyo, Japan	Decision (Majority)	3	3:00
2013-10-13	Loss	(Japan) Taiga	Krush-IGNITION 2013 vol.6, YOUTH GP 2013 –55 kg Tournament Semi Final	Tokyo, Japan	Ext.R Decision (Split)	3	3:00
2013-10-13	Win	(Japan) Ryusei	Krush-IGNITION 2013 vol.6, YOUTH GP 2013 –55 kg Tournament Quarter Final	Tokyo, Japan	KO (Low Kick)	2	1:32
2013-08-11	Win	(Japan) Kazuki Okawa	Krush 30	Tokyo, Japan	KO (Body Punches)	3	2:09
2013-04-21	Loss	(Japan) Ryuma Tobe	Krush-IGNITION 2013 vol.3	Tokyo, Japan	Decision (Unanimous)	3	3:00
2013-02-24	Loss	(Japan) Yuko Okada	Bigbang 12	Tokyo, Japan	Decision (Majority)	3	3:00
2012-12-14	Win	(Japan) Tatsuya Hibata	Krush 25	Tokyo, Japan	Decision (Majority)	3	3:00
2012-10-08	Win	(Japan) Yo-hei	Krush-EX 2012 vol.5	Tokyo, Japan	KO (Low Kick)	2	1:47
2012-09-09	Win	(Japan) Yoshiki Nakagawa	Krush YOUTH GP 2012 –63 kg Opening Round	Tokyo, Japan	Decision (Unanimous)	3	3:00
2012-06-17	Loss	(Japan) Yuya Suzuki	Krush-EX 2012 vol.3	Tokyo, Japan	Decision (Unanimous)	3	3:00
2012-04-22	Loss	(Japan) Nobuchika Terado	Krush－EX 2012 vol.1	Tokyo, Japan	Decision (Unanimous)	3	3:00
2012-02-17	Draw	(Japan) Yoshinori Sakuta	Krush 16	Tokyo, Japan	Decision	3	3:00
2011-11-12	Win	(Japan) Ryoji Imai	Krush 13	Tokyo, Japan	Decision (Unanimous)	3	3:00
2011-08-14	Win	(Japan) Kentaro Kimura	Krush 11	Tokyo, Japan	Ext.R Decision (Unanimous)	4	3:00
2011-05-29	Win	(Japan) Sengoku	Krush -70 kg Championship Inaugural Tournament	Tokyo, Japan	TKO (Low kicks)	3	1:26
2011-02-13	Win	(Japan) TARO	Krush-EX 2011 vol.1	Tokyo, Japan	Decision (Unanimous)	3	3:00
2010-07-09	Win	(Japan) Katsuki Sakaki	Krush 8	Tokyo, Japan	Decision (Unanimous)	3	3:00
2010-04-29	Draw	(Japan) Rikiya Omae	Krush 6	Tokyo, Japan	Decision	3	3:00
2010-02-19	Win	(Japan) Hikari Saenchaigym	Krush-EX～New Generation Fight～	Tokyo, Japan	KO	2	1:38
2009-12-09	Win	(Japan) Masahiro	SURVIVOR～Round.2～	Tokyo, Japan	Decision (Unanimous)	3	3:00
Legend: Win Loss Draw/No contest Notes

Amateur Kickboxing Record
'
Date	Result	Opponent	Event	Location	Method	Round	Time
2009-08-10	Loss	(Japan) Shinnosuke Ueda	K-1 Koshien 2009 KING OF UNDER 18 -FINAL16-	Tokyo, Japan	Decision	3	2:00
Legend: Win Loss Draw/No contest Notes
