= Shota Takiya =

Japanese kickboxer

- Born: 瀧谷渉太; April 15, 1989 (age 37); Aichi, Japan
- Other names: "Real Goku"
- Nationality: Japanese
- Height: 165 cm (5 ft 5 in)
- Weight: 55.0 kg (121.3 lb; 8.66 st)
- Style: Karate, Kickboxing
- Stance: Southpaw
- Fighting out of: Nagoya, Japan
- Team: Seishun Juku (2007 - 2013); KSS Kenseikan (2013 - 2020)
- Years active: 2007 - 2020

Kickboxing record
- Total: 46
- Wins: 32
- By knockout: 14
- Losses: 13
- By knockout: 1
- Draws: 1

Shota Takiya (Japanese: 瀧谷渉太, Takiya Shota; born April 15, 1989) is a retired Japanese kickboxer who competed in the super bantamweight divisions of Krush, K-1, RISE and Rizin FF. A professional competitor since 2007, he is a former two-time Krush Super Bantamweight champion.

== Kickboxing career ==
=== Early career ===
==== AJKF ====
Takiya made his professional debut against Kengo at AJKF Super Fight 2007 on July 29, 2007. He won the fight by a first-round knockout, stopping Kengo with a knee to the body at the 2:12 minute mark of the opening round.

Takiya was booked to face Naohito Terauchi at AJKF Road to 70's on September 29, 2007. He won the fight by a second-round jumping knee knockout.

Takiya faced Takeshi Haraoka at AJKF Kick Return/Kickboxer of the best 60 Tournament Final on October 25, 2007. He won the fight by a first-round knockout.

Takiya was booked to fight Kei Sakuchi at AJKF NEW Year Kick Festival 2008～70's Tournament Final～ on January 4, 2008. He was awarded the automatic technical knockout victory in the second round, after successfully knocking Sakuchi down three times by the 1:46 minute mark.

Takiya made his K-1 debut against Vitaly Lisniak at K-1 WORLD MAX 2008 World Championship Tournament FINAL16 on April 9, 2008. He won the fight by split decision. Two of the judges scored the bout 30–29 in his favor, while the third judge scored it 30–29 for Lisniak.

Takiya, at the time the #4 ranked AJKF bantamweight contender, was booked to face Hiroki Mizuhara in an AJKF bantamweight tournament semifinals at AJKF Reverse×Rebirth on July 26, 2008. He won the fight by unanimous decision, with scores of 29–27, 29–28 and 29–27.

Takiya made his K-1 return at K-1 Koshien KING OF UNDER 18～FINAL 16～ on August 29, 2008, against the 2–0–1 Rui Ebata. He won the fight by unanimous decision.

Takiya was booked to face the one-time AJKF bantamweight title challenger Nobuchika Terado for the vacant AJKF belt at AJKF New Year Kick Festival 2009 on January 4, 2009. He lost the fight by unanimous decision, with scores of 46–50, 47–50 and 46–49.

==== Early Krush career ====
Takiya made his Krush debut against Koya Urabe at Krush.3 on May 17, 2009. Notably, he weight in 4.9 kg under the contracted limit. Takiya lost the fight by unanimous decision. Takiya next faced Kenji Kubo at Krush Survivor～Round.2～ on September 12, 2009. He won the fight by a close majority decision, with scores of 29–29, 29–28 and 30–29. Takiya was booked to face Nasu at Krush 5 on January 4, 2010. He won the fight by a second-round technical knockout, as he successfully knocked Nasu three times by the 2:28 minute mark.

After losing a majority decision to Ryuya Kusakabe at Krush×Survivor on March 13, 2010, Takiya was booked to face TARO at Krush-EX 2010 vol.2 on June 12, 2010. He won the fight by a second-round knockout, flooring TARO with a left straight. Takiya faced Hiroaki Mizuhara in his third fight of the year, at Krush 10 on September 20, 2010. He won the closely contested bout by split decision, after an extra round was fought.

=== Krush super bantamweight champion ===
==== Super bantamweight tournament ====
His 4–2 record with the newly formed promotion earned Takiya a place in the Krush Inaugural Championship Tournament, held to crown the inaugural champions. He was booked to face Takumi Tosaka in the quarterfinals of the super bantamweight tournament, held on December 12, 2010. Takiya knocked Tosaka out with a combination of a knee and front kick at the 2:16 minute mark of the second round.

Advancing to the tournament semifinals, held on April 30, 2011, Takiya faced Kenji Kubo. The two previously fought on September 12, 2009, with Takiya edging Kubo out to a majority decision win. Takiya was victorious in the rematch as well, winning their second meeting by unanimous decision, after an extra round was fought. Takiya faced Ryuya Kusakabe in the finals of the tournament, which was held on the same day. He won the final bout of the tournament by a third-round knockout.

==== First title reign ====
After capturing his first professional title, Takiya was booked to face KO-ICHI in a non-title bout at Krush 11 on August 14, 2011. He won the fight by a first-round knockout. Takiya faced Damien Trainor, in his second non-title bout, at Krush 13 on November 12, 2011. He won the fight by a third-round knockout.

Takiya made his first Krush super bantamweight title defense against Nobuchika Terado at Krush 15 on January 9, 2012. He made quick work of Terado, as he won the fight by a first-round knockout. After successfully making his first title defense, Takiya was booked to face Reece Crooke in a non-title bout at Krush.18 on May 3, 2012. He won the fight by a third-round knockout.

Takiya made his second Krush super bantamweight title defense against Takumi Tosaka at Krush 22 on August 26, 2012. The bout was a rematch of their December 12, 2010, meeting, which Takiya won by a second-round knockout. Takiya won the rematch by unanimous decision. Takiya was next booked to face Mike Alamos in a non-title bout at Krush Grand Prix 2013 on January 14, 2013. Alamos won the fight by majority decision, snapping Takiya's ten fight winning streak.

Takiya vacated the Krush super bantamweight title on May 25, 2013 after moving to a non-K1 affiliated gym.

==== Second title reign ====
Takiya faced Masahiro at Krush-IGNITION 2013 vol.5 on July 13, 2013, in his first fight after switching to the KSS Kenseikan gym. He lost the fight by split decision. Takiya rebounded from this loss by notching two straight unanimous decision victories, with the first being against Ryuma Tobe at Krush.32 on September 1, 2013 and the second against Satoru at Krush.34 on November 10, 2013.

Takiya was booked to face Takumi Tosaka for the vacant Krush super bantamweight title, in a trilogy match held at Krush.37 on January 4, 2014. He won the fight by unanimous decision, with scores of 29–28, 29–28 and 30–28. Takiya made the first Krush title defense of his second reign against Ryuma Tobe at Krush.41 on May 11, 2014. He won the fight by majority decision. Takiya made his third title defense against Taiga Kawabe at Krush.45 on August 24, 2014. Taiga won the fight by unanimous decision.

==== Later K-1 career ====
Takiya faced Shou Rong at K-1 World GP 2015 -60kg Championship Tournament on January 18, 2015. He won the fight by unanimous decision, with scores of 30–27, 30–26 and 30–25. Takiya scored the sole knockdown of the bout in the first round, dropping Rong with a right hook.

Takiya participated in the 2016 K-1 super bantamweight grand prix, which was held on April 19, 2015. He faced Danial Williams in the quarterfinals of the same-day tournament. Takiya won the first bout of the tournament by unanimous decision and advanced to the semifinals, where he faced the reigning Krush Featherweight champion Takeru Segawa. Takeru won the fight by a first-round technical knockout.

Takiya returned to Krush for his next bout, as he was booked to face Yoshiki at Krush.57 ～in NAGOYA～ on August 22, 2015. He won the fight by unanimous decision. Takiya faced Yusho Kanemoto at Krush.61 on December 4, 2015, in his last fight with the promotion. He lost the fight by unanimous decision, after an extra round was fought.

=== RISE ===
Takiya was booked to face Masayoshi Kunimoto at HOOST CUP～KINGS NAGOYA 3～ on September 3, 2017, following a 21 month absence from the sport. Kunimoto won the fight by unanimous decision. Takiya next faced Reiya at HOOST CUP KINGS OSAKA 2 on November 26, 2017. He won the fight by unanimous decision.

Takiya made his RISE promotional debut against Azusa Kaneko at RISE 123 on March 24, 2018. He lost the fight by unanimous decision, with scores of 30–29, 30–28 and 30–28. Takiya was next booked to face Jin Mandokoro at RISE 124 on May 24, 2018. He lost the fight by unanimous decision, with scores of 30–28, 30–27 and 30–27.

Takiya made his Rizin debut against Syuto Sato at Rizin 12 - Nagoya on August 12, 2018. He won the fight by unanimous decision, with two judges awarding him a 28–25 scorecard, while the third scored it 28–26 in his favor.

Takiya faced Kazuya Okuwaki at RISE 128 on November 2, 2018. The fight was ruled a draw by split decision. Takiya faced Daishin Sakai at RISE Evol.2 on February 8, 2019. He notched his first victory with the promotion, as he won by a fourth-round technical knockout. Takiya was booked to re-match Jin Mandokoro at RISE 131 on March 23, 2019. Mandokoro once again won the fight by unanimous decision.

Takiya made his second appearance with Rizin at Rizin 18 - Nagoya on August 18, 2019, against Kazuki Osaki. Osaki won the fight by unanimous decision.

Takiya announced his retirement from the sport on January 8, 2020.

== Titles and accomplishments ==
Amateur

- Shin Karate
  - 2007 All Japan Shin Karate K-2 Grand Prix Lightweight Championship

Professional

- Krush
  - Krush Super Bantamweight Championship (Two time, former)
    - Three successful title defenses (across two reigns)

Awards

- eFight.jp
  - Fighter of the Month (January 2012)

== Fight record ==
Professional Kickboxing Record
32 Wins (14 (T)KO's), 13 Losses, 1 Draw
Date	Result	Opponent	Event	Location	Method	Round	Time
2019-08-18	Loss	(Japan) Kazuki Osaki	Rizin 18 - Nagoya	Nagoya, Japan	Decision (Unanimous)	3	3:00
2019-03-23	Loss	(Japan) Jin Mandokoro	RISE 131	Tokyo, Japan	Decision (Unanimous)	3	3:00
2019-02-08	Win	(Japan) Daishin Sakai	RISE Evol.2	Tokyo, Japan	TKO (Corner Stoppage)	4	1:43
2018-11-02	Draw	(Japan) Kazuya Okuwaki	RISE 128	Tokyo, Japan	Decision (Split)	3	3:00
2018-08-12	Win	(Japan) Syuto Sato	Rizin 12 - Nagoya	Nagoya, Japan	Decision (Unanimous)	3	3:00
2018-05-24	Loss	(Japan) Jin Mandokoro	RISE 124	Tokyo, Japan	Decision (Unanimous)	3	3:00
2018-03-24	Loss	(Japan) Azusa Kaneko	RISE 123	Tokyo, Japan	Decision (Unanimous)	3	3:00
2017-11-26	Win	(Japan) Reiya	HOOST CUP KINGS OSAKA 2	Osaka, Japan	Decision (Unanimous)	3	3:00
2017-09-03	Loss	(Japan) Masayoshi Kunimoto	HOOST CUP～KINGS NAGOYA 3～	Nagoya, Japan	Decision (Unanimous)	3	3:00
2015-12-04	Loss	(Japan) Yusho Kanemoto	Krush.61	Tokyo, Japan	Ext.R Decision (Unanimous)	4	3:00
2015-08-22	Win	(Japan) Yoshiki	Krush.57 ～in NAGOYA～	Nagoya, Japan	Decision (Unanimous)	3	3:00
2015-04-19	Loss	(Japan) Takeru	K-1 World GP 2016 –55 kg World Tournament, Semi Finals	Tokyo, Japan	TKO (Referee Stoppage/Left Hook)	1	1:31
2015-04-19	Win	(Australia) Danial Williams	K-1 World GP 2016 –55 kg World Tournament, Quarter Finals	Tokyo, Japan	Decision (Majority)	3	3:00
2015-01-18	Win	(China) Shou Rong	K-1 World GP 2015 -60kg Championship Tournament	Tokyo, Japan	Decision (Unanimous)	3	3:00
2014-08-24	Loss	(Japan) Taiga	Krush.45	Nagoya, Japan	Decision (Unanimous)	3	3:00
Lost the Krush Super Bantamweight title.
2014-05-11	Win	(Japan) Ryuma Tobe	Krush.41	Tokyo, Japan	Decision (Majority)	3	3:00
Defends the Krush Super Bantamweight title.
2014-01-04	Win	(Japan) Takumi Tosaka	Krush.37	Tokyo, Japan	Decision (Unanimous)	3	3:00
Wins the vacant Krush Super Bantamweight title.
2013-11-10	Win	(Japan) Satoru	Krush.34	Tokyo, Japan	Decision (Unanimous)	3	3:00
2013-09-01	Win	(Japan) Ryuma Tobe	Krush.32	Nagoya, Japan	Decision (Unanimous)	3	3:00
2013-07-13	Loss	(Japan) Masahiro	Krush-IGNITION 2013 vol.5	Tokyo, Japan	Decision (Split)	3	3:00
2013-01-14	Loss	(France) Mike Alamos	Krush Grand Prix 2013	Tokyo, Japan	Decision (Majority)	3	3:00
2012-08-26	Win	(Japan) Takumi Tosaka	Krush.22	Nagoya, Japan	Decision (Unanimous)	3	3:00
Defends the Krush Super Bantamweight title.
2012-05-03	Win	(United Kingdom) Reece Crooke	Krush.18	Tokyo, Japan	KO (Punches)	3	2:22
2012-01-09	Win	(Japan) Nobuchika Terado	Krush 15	Japan	KO (Jumping Knee)	1	1:11
Defends the Krush Super Bantamweight Belt
2011-11-12	Win	(United Kingdom) Damien Trainor	Krush 13	Japan	KO (Jumping Knee)	3	0:53
2011-08-14	Win	(Japan) KO-ICHI	Krush 11	Tokyo, Japan	KO (Punches)	1	1:22
2011-04-30	Win	(Japan) Ryuya Kusakabe	Krush Inaugural Championship Tournament ～Triple Final Round～Final	Tokyo, Japan	KO (Front Kick to the head)	3	2:14
Wins the Krush Super Bantamweight Belt
2011-04-30	Win	(Japan) Kenji Kubo	Krush Inaugural Championship Tournament ～Triple Final Round～Semi Final	Tokyo, Japan	Ext.R Decision (Unanimous)	4	3:00
2010-12-12	Win	(Japan) Takumi Tosaka	Krush Inaugural Championship Tournament ～Round.1～Quarter Final	Tokyo, Japan	KO (High Knee & Front Kick)	2	2:16
2010-09-20	Win	(Japan) Hiroaki Mizuhara	Krush 10	Tokyo, Japan	Ext.R Decision (Split)	4	3:00
2010-06-12	Win	(Japan) TARO	Krush-EX 2010 vol.2	Tokyo, Japan	KO (Left Straight)	2	0:23
2010-03-13	Loss	(Japan) Ryuya Kusakabe	Krush×Survivor	Tokyo, Japan	Decision (Majority)	3	3:00
2010-01-04	Win	(Japan) Nasu	Krush 5	Tokyo, Japan	KO (3 Knockdowns)	2	2:28
2009-12-09	Win	(Japan) Kenji Kubo	Survivor～Round.2～	Tokyo, Japan	Decision (Majority)	3	3:00
2009-09-22	Loss	(Japan) Shinya Nito	Krush 4	Tokyo, Japan	Decision (Majority)	3	3:00
2009-08-10	Win	(Japan) Norifumi Kidani	K-1 Koshien ～FINAL 16	Tokyo, Japan	TKO	1	3:00
2009-05-17	Loss	(Japan) Koya Urabe	Krush.3	Japan	Decision (Unanimous)	3	3:00
2009-04-18	Win	(Japan) Sota Ichinohe	AJKF CROSSOVER－2	Tokyo, Japan	Ext.R Decision (Unanimous)	3	3:00
2009-01-04	Loss	(Japan) Nobuchika Terado	AJKF New Year Kick Festival 2009, Bantamweight Championship Tournament final	Tokyo, Japan	Decision (Unanimous)	5	3:00
For the vacant AJKF Bantamweight title
2008-08-29	Win	(Japan) Rui Ebata	K-1 Koshien KING OF UNDER 18～FINAL 16～	Tokyo, Japan	Decision (Unanimous)	3	3:00
2008-07-26	Win	(Japan) Hiroki Mizuhara	AJKF Reverse×Rebirth	Tokyo, Japan	Decision (Unanimous)	3	3:00
2008-04-09	Win	(Ukraine) Vitaly Lisniak	K-1 WORLD MAX 2008 World Championship Tournament FINAL16	Tokyo, Japan	Decision (Split)	3	3:00
2008-01-04	Win	(Japan) Kei Sakuchi	AJKF NEW Year Kick Festival 2008～70's Tournament Final～	Tokyo, Japan	KO (Three knockdowns)	2	1:46
2007-10-25	Win	(Japan) Takeshi Haraoka	AJKF Kick Return/Kickboxer of the best 60 Tournament Final	Tokyo, Japan	TKO (Three knockdowns)	1	2:49
2007-09-29	Win	(Japan) Naohito Terauchi	AJKF Road to 70's	Tokyo, Japan	KO (Jumping knee)	2	2:45
2007-07-29	Win	(Japan) Kengo	AJKF Super Fight 2007	Tokyo, Japan	KO (Left knee)	1	2:12
Legend: Win Loss Draw/No contest Notes

== See also ==
- List of male kickboxers
- List of Krush champions
