= Ryuya Kusakabe =

Japanese kickboxer (born 1992)

- Born: 日下部竜也; July 18, 1992 (age 34); Toyota, Aichi, Japan
- Other names: "Little Giant"
- Nationality: Japanese
- Height: 163 cm (5 ft 4 in)
- Weight: 55.0 kg (121.3 lb; 8.66 st)
- Style: Kyokushin, Kickboxing
- Stance: Orthodox
- Fighting out of: Nagoya, Japan
- Team: Oishi Gym
- Rank: Black belt in Kyokushin Karate
- Years active: 2008 - 2014

Professional boxing record
- Total: 2
- Wins: 1
- By knockout: 0
- Losses: 1
- By knockout: 0

Kickboxing record
- Total: 19
- Wins: 16
- By knockout: 7
- Losses: 3
- By knockout: 2

Other information
- Boxing record from BoxRec

Ryuya Kusakabe (Japanese: 日下部竜也, Kusakabe Ryuya; born July 18, 1992) is a retired Japanese professional kickboxer and boxer. He is the former SHOOT BOXING and REBELS Super Bantamweight champion, as well as the former concurrent WBC Muaythai and WPMF Japan Super Bantamweight champion.

== Kickboxing & Muay Thai career ==
=== Early career ===
==== Amateur career ====
Kusakabe took part in the super bantamweight (-55 kg) event of the 2008 K-1 Koshien Chūbu region tournament, open exclusively to high-schoolers, on July 6, 2008. He captured the tournament title with three consecutive unanimous decisions in a single day, as he was able to overcome Kosuke Minowa in the quarterfinals, Taishi Hiratsuka in the semifinals and Yusuke Tsuboi in the finals.

This success earned him a place in the K-1 Koshien King of Under 18 Tournament, the opening round of which was held in Tokyo, Japan on October 1, 2008. Kusakabe beat Ryuma Tobe by unanimous decision in the opening round and future two-weight Krush champion Daizo Sasaki by a first-round knockout in the quarterfinals. He advanced the to tournament semifinals, held on December 31, 2008, where he suffered a third-round technical knockout stoppage at the hands of the future two-weight K-1 champion Koya Urabe.

==== Early professional career ====
Kusakabe made his debut as a professional competitor against Phetsanga Sakrungruang on March 16, 2008, at the famed Rajadamnern Stadium. He won the fight by a fourth-round technical knockout and went on to win two more fights before making his AJKF and Krush debuts against Rikiya Ozawa at AJKF Krush.3 on May 17, 2009. Kusakabe won the fight by unanimous decision, with all three judges awarding him a 30–27 scorecard. Kusakabe next faced the one-time AJKF Super Bantamweight title challenger Shota Takiya at Krush×Survivor on March 13, 2010. He won the fight by majority decision. Two of the judges scored the bout 30–29 and 30–28 in his favor, while the third ringside official handed in an even 30–30 scorecard.

=== Super bantamweight champion ===
==== Shootboxing champion ====
On March 30, 2010, it was revealed that Kusakabe would be one of eight participants in the Shootboxing Young Caesars Super Bantamweight tournament, with the eventual winner being guaranteed a title shot. Kusakabe faced Masahiro Fujimoto in the tournament quarterfinals at "Anniversary Series 2 -ISHIN- So no Ni" on April 11. The bout was judged a majority draw after the first three rounds were contested. Two of the ringside officials scored the contest 29–29, while the third judge edged it 29–28 for Kusakaba, who was declared the winner by unanimous decision after an extra fourth round was fought.

Kusakabe faced Masanori Minato in the Young Caesars tournament semifinals at "Anniversary Series 3 -ISHIN- So no San" on June 6, 2010. He won the fight by a third-round technical knockout and advanced to the Ceasers Cup final, held on the same day, where he faced Kazuyuki Fushimi, who he had beaten by unanimous decision two years prior. Kusakabe was even more successful in the rematch, as he was able to knock Fushimi out with a hook to the body at the 1:35 minute mark of the final round.

The tournament victory earned Kusakabe the right to challenge Phantom Shinya for the Shootboxing Japan Super Bantamweight Championship at "Anniversary Series 4 -ISHIN- So no Yon" on September 18, 2010. He won the fight by a third-round technical knockout to become the youngest champion in Shootboxing history at the age of 18 years and two months, breaking the record previously held by Makoto Ue by a month.

==== Krush tournament run ====
On November 11, 2010, it was announced that Kusakabe would be taking part in the Krush Super Bantamweight Inaugural Championship Tournament. Kusakabe faced the former AJKF and RISE bantamweight champion Nobuchika Terado in the quarterfinals, which were held on December 12, 2010. He won the fight by unanimous decision. Kusakabe faced Hiroaki Mizuhara in the tournament semifinals on April 30, 2011. He won the fight by unanimous decision and advanced to the final, held on the same day, where he faced Shota Takiya for the inaugural Krush Super Bantamweight title. Kusakabe suffered the first loss of his professional career, as Takiya was able to stop him with a front kick, near the end of the third and final round.

=== Transition to muay thai ===
Kusakabe made his return to muay thai on October 2, 2011, when he faced Arato for the vacant WBC Muay Thai Japan Super Bantamweight title. He won the fight by a fifth-round knockout.

Kusakabe faced Sota Ichinohe at 2011 Fujiwara Matsuri on December 22, 2011. He won the fight by unanimous decision. Kusakabe was next challenged Yusuke Shimizu for the WPMF Japan Super Bantamweight title at M-1 Muay Thai Challenge "Suk Yod Muaythai vol.1 Part 2" on March 25, 2012. He won the fight by unanimous decision, with two scorecards of 49–48 and one scorecard of 49–47.

Kusakabe made his first WBC Muay Thai Japan Super Bantamweight title defense against Keisuke Miyamoto at NJKF KICK TO THE FUTURE 6 on September 22, 2012. He lost the fight by unanimous decision.

Kusakabe faced Ilias El Hajoui at HOOST CUP SPIRIT 1 on November 23, 2012. He won the fight by a third-round knockout. After he successfully bounced back from his second professional loss at the hands of Miyamoto, Kusakabe made his first WPMF Japan Super Bantamweight title defense against Sota Ichinohe at HOOST CUP KINGS Oujatachi no Kyouen on June 16, 2013. He lost the fight by a fifth-round knockout.

A month later, at REBELS 18 on July 21, Kusakabe faced Taisuke Degai for the inaugural REBELS Super Bantamweight (-55kg) title. He won the fight by unanimous decision, with scores of 50–47, 49–47 and 49–48.

Kusakabe announced his retirement from the sports of kickboxing and muay thai on February 19, 2014, in order to begin competing in professional boxing.

== Championships and accomplishments ==
=== Kickboxing ===
- K-1
  - 2008 K-1 Koshien Super Bantamweight (-55 kg) Chūbu Tournament Winner
  - 2009 K-1 Koshien Super Bantamweight (-55 kg) Tournament Third Place
- SHOOT BOXING
  - 2010 Shoot Boxing Super Bantamweight (-55 kg) Young Ceasers Cup Tournament Winner
  - 2010 Shoot Boxing Super Bantamweight (-55kg) Championship
  - Youngest fighter to win a Shootboxing Championship (18 years, 60 days)
- Krush
  - 2011 Krush Super Bantamweight Inaugural Championship Tournament Runner-up

=== Muay thai ===
- World Boxing Council Muay Thai
  - 2011 WBC Muay Thai Japan Super Bantamweight Championship
- World Professional Muaythai Federation
  - 2012 WPMF Japan Super Bantamweight Championship
- REBELS
  - 2013 REBELS Super Bantamweight (-55kg) Championship

=== Karate ===
- IKO Kyokushinkaikan
  - 2006 Kyokushinkaikan International Youth Championships U-14 -50 kg Winner
- Japan Karate Judge Organization
  - 2006 JKJO Japan Cup Junior Championship Middle School -50 kg Winner
  - 2007 JKJO All Japan Junior Championship Middle School -65 kg Winner

== Kickboxing and Muay Thai record ==
Professional Kickboxing and Muay Thai Record
16 Wins (7 (T)KO's), 3 Losses, 0 Draw
Date	Result	Opponent	Event	Location	Method	Round	Time
2013-07-21	Win	(Japan) Taisuke Degai	REBELS.18	Tokyo, Japan	Decision (Unanimous)	5	3:00
Wins the REBELS Super Bantamweight (-55kg) title.
2013-06-16	Loss	(Japan) Sota Ichinohe	HOOST CUP KINGS Oujatachi no Kyouen	Nagoya, Japan	KO (Elbow)	5	1:40
Loses the WPMF Japan Super Bantamweight title.
2012-11-23	Win	(Morocco) Ilias El Hajoui	HOOST CUP SPIRIT 1	Nagoya, Japan	KO (Left hook)	3	
2012-09-22	Loss	(Japan) Keisuke Miyamoto	NJKF KICK TO THE FUTURE 6	Tokyo, Japan	Decision (Unanimous)	5	3:00
Loses the WBC Muay Thai Japan Super Bantamweight title.
2012-03-25	Win	(Japan) Yusuke Shimizu	M-1 Muay Thai Challenge "Suk Yod Muaythai vol.1 Part 2"	Tokyo, Japan	Decision (Unanimous)	5	3:00
Wins the WPMF Japan Super Bantamweight title.
2011-12-22	Win	(Japan) Sota Ichinohe	2011 Fujiwara Matsuri	Tokyo, Japan	Decision (Unanimous)	5	3:00
2011-10-02	Win	(Japan) Arato	WBC Muay Thai Japan "The Path to the World Champion"	Tokyo, Japan	KO (Left hook)	5	2:30
Wins the vacant WBC Muay Thai Japan Super Bantamweight title.
2011-04-30	Loss	(Japan) Shota Takiya	Krush Inaugural Championship Tournament ～Triple Final Round～ Final	Tokyo, Japan	KO (Front Kick)	3	2:14
For the inaugural Krush Super Bantamweight title.
2011-04-30	Win	(Japan) Hiroaki Mizuhara	Krush Inaugural Championship Tournament ～Triple Final Round～ Semi Final	Tokyo, Japan	Decision (Unanimous)	3	3:00
2010-12-12	Win	(Japan) Nobuchika Terado	Krush Inaugural Championship Tournament ~First Round~	Tokyo, Japan	Decision (Unanimous)	3	3:00
2010-09-18	Win	(Japan) Phantom Shinya	SHOOT BOXING 25th Anniversary Series 4 -ISHIN- So no Yon	Tokyo, Japan	KO (Punch + knee to the body)	3	1:03
Wins Shoot Boxing Super Bantamweight (-55kg) title.
2010-06-06	Win	(Japan) Kazuyuki Fushimi	SHOOT BOXING 25th Anniversary Series 3 -ISHIN- So no San, Young Caesars Tournament Final	Tokyo, Japan	KO (Left hook to the body)	3	1:35
Wins 2010 Shoot Boxing Young Caesars Super Bantamweight Tournament title.
2010-06-06	Win	(Japan) Masanori Minato	SHOOT BOXING 25th Anniversary Series 3 -ISHIN- So no San, Young Caesars Tournament Semifinal	Tokyo, Japan	TKO (Punches)	3	2:41
2010-04-11	Win	(Japan) Masahiro Fujimoto	SHOOT BOXING 25th Anniversary Series 2 -ISHIN- So no Ni	Tokyo, Japan	Ext.R Decision (Unanimous)	4	3:00
2010-03-13	Win	(Japan) Shota Takiya	Krush×Survivor	Tokyo, Japan	Decision (Majority)	3	3:00
2009-05-17	Win	(Japan) Rikiya Ozawa	AJKF Krush.3	Tokyo, Japan	Decision (Unanimous)	3	3:00
2009-03-08	Win	(Japan) Genki Minato	Nagoya Kick 〜Boogie Fight 07〜	Nagoya, Japan	KO	2	2:14
2008-05-28	Win	(Japan) Kazuyuki Fushimi	SHOOT BOXING 2008 Hidama 〜Road to S-cup〜 So no San	Tokyo, Japan	Ext.R Decision (Unanimous)	3	2:00
2008-03-16	Win	(Thailand) Phetsanga Sakrungruang	Kiatyongyut, Rajadamnern Stadium	Bangkok, Thailand	TKO (Punches)	4	
Legend: Win Loss Draw/No contest Notes

Amateur Kickboxing Record
Date	Result	Opponent	Event	Location	Method	Round	Time
2009-12-31	Loss	(Japan) Tsukasa Fuji	Dynamite!! 2009, Koshien Tournament Reserve Fight	Saitama, Japan	Decision (Majority)	3	2:00
2009-10-26	Loss	(Japan) Hiroya Kawabe	K-1 World MAX 2009 World Championship Tournament Final - Koshien Tournament, Quarterfinals	Saitama, Japan	Decision (unanimous)	3	2:00
2009-08-10	Win	(Japan) Ryosuke Sasaki	K-1 Koshien 2009 Tournament FINAL 16	Tokyo, Japan	TKO (Right cross)	3	1:28
2008-12-31	Loss	(Japan) Koya Urabe	Dynamite!! 2008 - Koshien Tournament, Semifinals	Saitama, Japan	TKO (Doctor stoppage)	3	2:29
2008-10-01	Win	(Japan) Daizo Sasaki	K-1 World MAX 2008 World Championship Tournament Final - Koshien Tournament, Quarterfinals	Tokyo, Japan	KO (Left High Kick)	1	2:43
2008-10-01	Win	(Japan) Ryuma Tobe	K-1 World MAX 2008 World Championship Tournament Final - Koshien Tournament, First Round	Tokyo, Japan	Decision (Unanimous)	3	2:00
2008-07-06	Win	(Japan) Yusuke Tsuboi	2008 K-1 Koshien Chubu Region Selection Tournament, Final	Tokyo, Japan	Decision (Unanimous)	1	2:00
2008-07-06	Win	(Japan) Taishi Hiratsuka	2008 K-1 Koshien Chubu Region Selection Tournament, Semi Final	Tokyo, Japan	Decision (Unanimous)	1	2:00
2008-07-06	Win	(Japan) Kosuke Minowa	2008 K-1 Koshien Chubu Region Selection Tournament, Quarter Final	Tokyo, Japan	Decision (Unanimous)	1	1:30
2008-08-03	Win	(Japan) Man☆Mamoru	Nagoya Kick 〜Boogie Fight 05〜	Nagoya, Japan	Decision (Unanimous)	3	3:00
2008-05-17	Win	(Japan) Daichi Sugishita	Nagoya Kick 〜Boogie Fight 04〜	Nagoya, Japan	Decision (Majority)	3	2:00
2008-04-14	Win	(Japan) Koji Ikimi	Striking Challenge 14	Nagoya, Japan	KO	2	2:18
2007-12-22	Win	(Japan) Hiroya Ashino	Team Dragon "Burning Dragon! Part 1" Amateur Challenge Match	Tokyo, Japan	Decision (Unanimous)	1	3:00
2007-12-02	Win	(Japan) Kazushi Saga	Striking Challenge 13	Nagoya, Japan	KO (Left cross)	2	0:50
2007-10-28	Win	(Japan) Tsuyoshi Yamamoto	BRIDGE one match challenge 6th	Tōkai, Aichi Japan	KO (Right cross)	1	
Legend: Win Loss Draw/No contest Notes

== Professional boxing record ==
2 fights	1 win	1 loss
By decision	1	1

No.	Result	Record	Opponent	Type	Round, time	Date	Location	Notes
2	Win	1–1	Shuntaro Ouchi	UD	4	Jul 20, 2014	Aioi Hall, Kariya, Aichi, Japan	
1	Loss	0–1	Takashi Igarashi	MD	4	Apr 6, 2014	Aioi Hall, Kariya, Aichi, Japan	

== See also ==
- List of male kickboxers
