= Andy Howson =

British Muay Thai fighter

- Born: Andrew Howson; May 29, 1979 (age 47)
- Other names: The Punisher; Lord of War
- Nationality: British
- Height: 1.68 m (5 ft 6 in)
- Weight: 56.6 kg (125 lb; 8 st 13 lb)
- Division: Super Bantamweight; Bantamweight
- Style: Muay Thai, Kickboxing
- Stance: Orthodox
- Fighting out of: Leeds, England
- Team: Bad Company; Jitti Gym; Black Widow; Science of 8
- Trainer: Richard Smith

Kickboxing record
- Total: 96
- Wins: 81
- Losses: 14
- Draws: 1

Andy Howson (born May 29, 1979) is a British retired Muay Thai fighter from The Bad Company gym based in Leeds. He is a five-time world champion in the 55 kg super bantamweight division and a former ONE Championship fighter. Howson fought for years against high caliber opponents and holds wins over names like Damien Trainor, Weera 'Spicy' Minghton, Mohad Ali Yakub and Somboombap Phumpaneang. Howson retired from fighting in 2015 and made a short comeback in 2018 until retiring again in 2020.

== Muay Thai career ==
During his 24-year career, Andy won multiple titles across several levels of professional boxing. His achievements included five world championships, among them the WBC world title at 53.5 kg, as well as two intercontinental titles, two Commonwealth titles, the European title, two British titles, and the English title. Over the course of an 88-fight career, he recorded 74 wins (27 by knockout), 13 losses, and one draw. He was also ranked as the United Kingdom's number one bantamweight and lost only twice to English opponents within his weight division.

For the past two decades Andy has dedicated his time to the sport of Muay Thai, in the famous gym Bad Company (Leeds). Since the beginning Andy has gone on to compete across the world, testing himself against fighters in his weight class.

Andy is known as 'The Punisher', or 'Lord of War', for his fighting style and heart and for his never give up attitude.

In 2009 he fought Mohad Ali Yakub for the WMC World title and won via decision.

Howson picked up his 5th world title in 2014 beating Mohamed Bouchareb on points for the vacant WBC bantamweight title. He then retired in 2015 after losing by stoppage to Joseph Lasiri from Italy.

Howson now runs the Muay Thai gym Science of 8 located in West Bromwich and is producing many champion fighters.

A few short months after his last fight Andy was approached by One Championship and signed a 5 fight deal.

Andy Howson next fought Josh Tonna of Australia at ONE Championship: Warrior's Code on February 7, 2020. Howson lost the fight by second-round knockout.

== Boxing career ==
=== Survivor Tag ===
On 8 October 2026, Misfits Boxing announced a Survivor Tag boxing match as a last minute addition on the Joey Essex vs. Dapper Laughs undercard. Howson, alongside Lil Cracra, Joey Knight and Felony Charles, were scheduled to compete on 10 October at the Copper Box Arena in London, England. Charles was replaced by Tolbzter as a last minute replacement, but was unfortunately changed to just three fighters on the night. Howson was eliminated in the first round after being knocked down by Lil Cracra and the bout ended in Knight getting technically knocked out by Lil Cracra in the third round.

== Titles and accomplishments ==
- International Sport Karate Association
  - 2008 ISKA Muay Thai World Bantamweight Champion
- World Muaythai Council
  - 2009 WMC World Super Bantamweight Champion
- WBC Muay Thai
  - 2014 WBC Muay Thai World Bantamweight Champion

== Muay Thai record ==
Muay Thai record
81 Wins, 14 Losses, 1 Draw
Date	Result	Opponent	Event	Location	Method	Round	Time
2020-02-07	Loss	(Australia) Josh Tonna	ONE Championship: Warrior's Code	Kallang, Singapore	KO (Knee to the head)	2	2:20
2018-04-28	Win	(Italy) Gianpiero Sportelli	HGH Promotions	United Kingdom	KO	2	
2015-04-26	Loss	(Italy) Joseph Lasiri		United Kingdom	TKO	2	
2014-12-06	Loss	(Australia) Danial Williams	Caged Muay Thai 5	Queensland, Australia	Decision (split)	3	3:00
For the CMT Super Bantamweight title.
2014-09-06	Win	(France) Mohamed Bouchareb	Smash Muaythai 10	United Kingdom	Decision	3	3:00
Wins the WBC Muay Thai World 118lb title.
2013-11-02	Win	(Republic of Ireland) Aaron O'Callaghan	The Main Event	United Kingdom	Decision	5	3:00
2012-12-01	Loss	(Thailand) Thanit Watthanaya	Muay Thai in America: In Honor of the King	Los Angeles, United States	TKO	5	
2012-10-06	Loss	(Republic of Ireland) Aaron O'Callaghan	Muay Thai Super Fights	Cork, Ireland	Decision (split)	5	3:00
2012-08-12	Loss	(Japan) Nobuchika Terado	Krush.21	Tokyo, Japan	KO	2	2:07
For the ISKA World Bantamweight title
2012-06-24	Win	(United Kingdom) Damien Trainor	Thai Boxing	United Kingdom	Decision	5	3:00
2012-02-18	Win	(Sweden) Viet Hoang	The Thai Boxing Takeover	United Kingdom	Decision	5	3:00
2011-05-07	Loss	(United Kingdom) Dean James	World Championship Muaythai	United Kingdom	TKO	4	
For the ISKA Muay Thai World 121lb title.
2010-06-26	Win	(Italy) Carlo Pappada	World Championship Thaiboxing	United Kingdom	TKO	4	
2012-04-03	Loss	(United States) Romie Adanza	Muay Thai in America	Santa Monica, United States	Decision (Split)	5	3:00
2010-03-27	Loss	(United Kingdom) Dean James	MSA Muaythai Premier League	United Kingdom	Decision	3	3:00
2009-11-07	Loss	(Thailand) Rungravee Sasiprapa	MSA Muaythai Premier League	United Kingdom	TKO	3	
2009-06-13	Win	(Malaysia) Mohd Ali Yakuub	World Championship Thai Boxing	United Kingdom	Decision	5	3:00
Wins the WMC World Super Bantamweight title.
2009-02-07	Win	(United Kingdom) Damien Trainor	Muaythai Legends - England vs. Thailand	United Kingdom	Decision	5	3:00
2008-11-30	Loss	(Thailand) Super K Sitjaipetch	Contender Asia UK Eliminator	United Kingdom	Decision	3	3:00
2008-10-18	Win	(Japan) Kunitaka	Muay Thai CLASH 11 in Leeds	United Kingdom	Decision (Majority)	5	3:00
Wins the ISKA World Muay Thai Bantamweight title.
2008-06-14	Win	(Thailand) Weera Mingthon	Bad Company Show	United Kingdom	Decision	3	3:00
2008-05-04	Loss	(Belarus) Dmitry Varats	Power of Scotland 4	United Kingdom	TKO	2	
2008-05-04	Win	(Thailand) Somboonbab	Power of Scotland 4	United Kingdom	TKO	1	
2007-11-25	Win	(Thailand) Jaotapee Kiatkorwit	Supreme World Muay Thai Championship	United Kingdom	KO	3	
Wins the WMC Intercontinental title.
2007-10-14	Win	(Portugal) Fernando Machado	Combat Superfights	United Kingdom	KO	2	
2006-11-26	Win	(Belarus) Oleg Mihailov	Muay Thai Super Fight	United Kingdom	TKO	2	
2006-06-17	Win	(France) Albert Veera Chey	World Class Professional Thai Boxing	United Kingdom	Decision	5	3:00
2006-02-26	Loss	(United Kingdom) Damien Trainor	Combat Superfights	United Kingdom	Decision (majority)	5	3:00
2005-11-20	Draw	(Thailand) Kantipong	Muay Thai Superfights	United Kingdom	Decision	5	3:00
2005-06-26	Win	(France) Sebastien Ocaña	Thai Boxing	United Kingdom	Decision	5	3:00
Wins the WAKO Pro European title.
2005-02-27	Win	(United Kingdom) Damien Trainor	Master Sken's Fight Night	United Kingdom	TKO (Injury)	3	
2004-11-28	Win	(Italy) Simone Grenzi		United Kingdom	TKO	3	
Wins the WPKL Intercontinental title.
2004-10-10	Win	(Republic of Ireland) Eoghan Murphy	Thaiboxing	United Kingdom	TKO	4	
2004	Loss	(United Kingdom) Reece Crooke		United Kingdom	Decision (Unanimous)	5	3:00
2003-04-28	Win	(Belgium) Abdel Soussi	Thaiboxing	United Kingdom	Disqualification		
Legend: Win Loss Draw/No contest Notes

== Boxing record ==
=== MF–Professional ===
1 fight	0 wins	1 loss
By decision	0	1

No.	Result	Record	Opponent	Type	Round, time	Date	Location	Notes
1	Loss	0–1	Joey Knight	UD	5	16 May 2025	Vaillant Live, Derby, England	

=== Survivor Tag ===
1 fight	0 wins	1 loss
By knockout	0	1

No.	Result	Record	Opponents	Type	Round, time	Date	Location	Notes
1	Loss	0–1	Lil Cracra	TKO	3 (5), 2:32	10 Oct 2026	Copper Box Arena, London, England	Cracra won via technical knockout defeating Knight in the third round. Howson was eliminated in the first round.
1	Loss	0–1	Joey Knight	TKO	3 (5), 2:32	10 Oct 2026	Copper Box Arena, London, England	Cracra won via technical knockout defeating Knight in the third round. Howson was eliminated in the first round.
