= Albert Veera Chey =

French kickboxer

- Born: Albert Veera Chey Loum; 28 December 1982 (age 43); Châteauroux, France
- Nationality: French
- Height: 1.70 m (5 ft 7 in)
- Weight: 57.0 kg (125.7 lb; 8.98 st)
- Division: Bantamweight; Flyweight
- Style: Kun Khmer, Muay Thai
- Stance: Orthodox
- Fighting out of: France
- Team: Impacts Aquitaine; Temple

Kickboxing record
- Total: 88
- Wins: 79
- Losses: 9

Albert Veera Chey (born December 28, 1982) is a Flyweight French Pradal Serey and Muay Thai kickboxer of Khmer descent on his parents side.

== Career ==
March 16, 2013 in Déols, France Explosion Fight Night 7, Albert Veera Chey defeated Gery Bavetta by unanimous decision to win the ISKA −57 kg World Title.

June 25, 2011 in Saint-Nazaire, France Le grand defi, Final, Albert Veera Chey defeated Thong Puindeenaidee by unanimous decision to win the 2011 WMA −57 kg World Title.

== Coaching ==
He is the owner of the Temple gym in Bordeaux where he trains Omar Samb and Mbaye Samb.

== Championships and awards ==
Muay Thai

- ISKA
  - 2013 ISKA −57 kg World Title
- WMA
  - 2011 WMA −57 kg World Title
- FFSCDA
  - 2011 FFSCDA −57 kg National Title
- WPMF
  - 2010 WPMF −57 kg European Title
- FBTMTDA
  - 2008 FBTMTDA −57 kg National Title

== Kickboxing record ==
Kickboxing record
43 wins, 9 losses, 0 draws
Date	Result	Opponent	Event	Location	Method	Round	Time
2014-02-01	Win	(Italy) Marco De Virgilio	Explosion Fight Night 9	Déols, France	Decision (Unanimous)	5	3:00
2013-03-16	Win	(Italy) Gery Bavetta	Explosion Fight Night 7	Déols, France	Decision (Unanimous)	5	3:00
Wins the ISKA −57kg World Title.
2012-11-17	Win	(France) Amine Zitouni	Explosion Fight Night 6	Châteauroux, France	KO (Left Kick to the Body)	2	
2012-10-06	Loss	(France) Amine Kacem	TIME FIGHT: Event 2	Joué-lès-Tours, France	Decision (Unanimous)	5	3:00
2012-04-07	Loss	(United Kingdom) David Macintosh	Explosion Fight Night 5	Déols, France	Decision (Unanimous)	5	3:00
2011-11-12	Win	(France) Oliver Moriano	Nuit des Champions 2011	Marseille, France	Decision (Unanimous)	5	3:00
2011-06-25	Win	(Thailand) Thong Puideenaidee	Le grand defi	Saint-Nazaire, France	Decision (Unanimous)	5	3:00
Wins the WMA −57kg World Title.
2011-05-28	Win	(France) Vatsana Sedone	4e Soiree de Boxe Thai	Montargis, France	Decision (Unanimous)	5	3:00
2011-05-07	Win	(Thailand) Chokchai Thongsamarith	Finales Championnat De France Muaythai	Paris, France	KO	2	
Wins the FFSCDA −57kg National Title.
2010-04-24	Win	(Portugal) Rui Garcia	Fight Night	Bordeaux, France	KO	2	
Wins the WPMF −57kg European Title.
2010-02-26	Win	(Thailand) Pradermchai Kaewsamrit	Lumpinee Kerkkrai: Villaume vs Saiyok	Bangkok, Thailand	TKO	4	
2009-11-28	Loss	(Thailand) Jomthong Chuwattana	A1 Lyon	Lyon, France	Decision	5	3:00
2009-05-16	Win	(France) Karim Bennoui	Légendes et Guerriers	Toulouse, France	TKO (Referee Stoppage)	5	
2009-04-11	Win	(Italy) Patrick Carta	Muay Thai & Pancrase II	Bordeaux, France	Decision (Unanimous)	5	3:00
2009-02-07	Win	(France) Xavier Bastard	Gala de Boxe Thai de Saumur	Saumur, France	TKO (Referee Stoppage)	5	
2008-12-06	Win	(France) Anthony Fiorelli	Muaythai : tournoi −60 kg	Nantes, France	TKO (Corner Stoppage)	1	
2008-12-06	Win	(France) Daoud Medour	Muaythai : tournoi −60 kg	Nantes, France	KO	2	
2008-06-28	Win	(France) Christophe Tang	Finale du Championnat FBTMTDA	Colombelles, France	KO		
Wins the FBTMTDA −57kg National Title.
2008-06-22	Win	(Cambodia) Beut Somkhann	Gala Kun Khmer – Muaythai	Vieux-Condé, France	Decision	5	3:00
2008-05-04	Loss	(Belarus) Dmitry Varats	Power of Scotland 4 Tournament Quarter Finals	United Kingdom	Decision	3	3:00
2007-07-08	Win	(Thailand) Petchmonkong	Kiatsingnoi Fights (Rajadamnern)	Bangkok, Thailand	KO	4	
2007-03-17	Win	(Italy) Lorenzo Paoli	The King Of Kings III	Milan, Italy	KO	3	
2007-01-27	Win	(France) Mounir Bouti	Gala de Saumer	Saumur, France	Decision	5	3:00
2006-12-16	Win	(France) Anthony Fiorelli	Super Fight Muay Thai	Bordeaux, France	Decision	5	3:00
2006-11-04	Win	(Belgium) Ali Abrayem	Thailand vs Europe	Peruwelz, Belgium	Decision	5	3:00
2006-06-17	Loss	(United Kingdom) Andy Howson	World Class Professional Thai Boxing	United Kingdom	Decision	5	3:00
2006-05-13	Win	(France) Fred Wyart	Muay Thai & Break Dance Fury	Bordeaux, France	KO	3	
2006-01-14	Loss	(France) Mounir Bouti	La Nuit des Superfights III	Villebon, France	TKO	3	
2005	Win	(Spain) Julio Vargas	Anaitasuna	Spain	Decision (Unanimous)	5	3:00
Legend: Win Loss Draw/No contest Notes
