= Nobuchika Terado =

Japanese kickboxer

- Born: 寺戸伸近; September 9, 1980 (age 46); Hamada, Shimane, Japan
- Nationality: Japanese
- Height: 166 cm (5 ft 5 in)
- Weight: 55.0 kg (121.3 lb; 8.66 st)
- Style: Kickboxing
- Stance: Orthodox
- Fighting out of: Japan
- Team: Booch Beat
- Years active: 2003 - 2017

Kickboxing record
- Total: 52
- Wins: 40
- By knockout: 16
- Losses: 11
- By knockout: 7
- Draws: 1

Nobuchika Terado (born September 9, 1980) is a retired Japanese kickboxer. He was the 2009 AJKF and RISE Bantamweight champion, the 2011 ISKA Bantamweight and 2012 Super Bantamweight champion, as well as the 2016 Krush Super Bantamweight champion.

Combat Press ranked him as a top ten bantamweight between April and June 2018.

== Kickboxing career ==
On August 25, 2007, Terado challenged Arashi Fujihara for the AJKF Bantamweight title. The fight ended in the fourth round, as Terado's corner decided to throw in the towel, following a series of body shots which downed their fighter.

Terado took part in the AJKF Bantamweight tournament held on January 4, 2009, to determine the new champion. He beat Nasu and Shota Takiya by unanimous decision in the semifinals and finals respectively. Two months later he won the M-1 Bantamweight title with a second-round TKO of Hiroki Maeda.

Terado won the RISE Bantamweight title with a second-round TKO of TOMONORI at RISE 60. He was scheduled to make his first title defense against Makoto Kushima at RISE 68. Terado won the fight by unanimous decision.

At Krush 11, on August 14, 2011, Terado was scheduled to fight Kieran McCaskill for the ISKA World Super Bantamweight title. He won the fight by unanimous decision.

Terado fought a rematch with Shota Takiya at Krush 15 for the Krush Super Bantamweight title. He lost the fight by a first-round knockout.

Terado fought Andy Howson at Krush 21, for his second ISKA title, the ISKA World Super Bantamweight title. He knocked Howson out in the second round.

On May 12, 2013, Terado fought Takeru Segawa at Krush 28 for the Krush Featherweight title. Takeru won the fight by unanimous decision.

Terado fought for a Krush title for the third time in his career at Krush 64, when he fought Ryuji Horio for the Krush Super Bantamweight strap. Terado won the fight by unanimous decision. Terado successfully defended his title twice before retiring, knocking out Charles Bongiovanni at Krush 69, and winning an extra round decision against Kenji Kubo at Krush 82.

== Titles and accomplishments ==
- All Japan Kickboxing Federation
  - 2004 AJKF Rookie of the Year Award
  - 2009 AJKF Bantamweight Champion
- M-1 Muay Thai
  - 2009 M-1 Bantamweight Champion
- RISE
  - 2009 RISE -55 kg Champion (defended once)
- International Sport Karate Association
  - 2011 ISKA World Super Bantamweight Champion
  - 2012 ISKA World Bantamweight Champion (defended twice)
- K-1/Krush
  - 2016 Krush Super Bantamweight Champion (defended twice)

Awards

- eFight.jp
  - Fighter of the Month (August 2012)

== Kickboxing record ==
Professional Kickboxing Record
40 Wins (16 (T)KO's), 11 Losses, 1 Draw, 0 No Contest
Date	Result	Opponent	Event	Location	Method	Round	Time
2017-11-05	Win	(Japan) Kenji Kubo	Krush.82	Tokyo, Japan	Ext.R Decision (Unanimous)	4	3:00
Defends the Krush Super Bantamweight Belt
2017-04-22	Loss	(Japan) Kenji Kubo	K-1 World GP 2017 Super Bantamweight Championship Tournament, Semi Finals	Tokyo, Japan	KO (Left Straight)	2	3:00
2017-04-22	Win	(United Kingdom) Jamie Whelan	K-1 World GP 2017 Super Bantamweight Championship Tournament, Quarter Finals	Tokyo, Japan	Ext.R Decision (Split)	4	3:00
2016-09-30	Win	(France) Charles Bongiovanni	Krush.69	Tokyo, Japan	KO (3 Knockdowns)	1	3:00
Defends the Krush Super Bantamweight Belt
2016-03-20	Win	(Japan) Ryuji Horio	Krush.64	Tokyo, Japan	Decision (Unanimous)	3	3:00
Wins the Krush Super Bantamweight Belt
2015-04-19	Loss	(Japan) Taiga	K-1 World GP 2015 -55kg Championship Tournament, Semi Finals	Tokyo, Japan	KO (Right Hook)	3	2:40
2015-04-19	Win	(Portugal) Rui Botelho	K-1 World GP 2015 -55kg Championship Tournament, Quarter Finals	Tokyo, Japan	Ext.R Decision (Split)	3	3:00
2014-11-09	Win	(Japan) Kunihiro	KICKBOXING ZONE	Tokyo, Japan	Decision (Unanimous)	5	3:00
2014-07-13	Win	(Turkey) Vedat Uruc	Krush.43	Tokyo, Japan	KO (Left Hook)	1	1:03
Defends the ISKA World Bantamweight title
2014-02-14	Win	(Japan) Yuya Suzuki	Krush.38	Tokyo, Japan	Decision (Unanimous)	3	3:00
2013-08-25	Win	(Russia) Alexander Prilip	Krush.31 ～in HIROSHIMA～	Hiroshima, Japan	Decision (Unanimous)	5	3:00
Defends the ISKA World Bantamweight title
2013-05-12	Loss	(Japan) Takeru	Krush.28 –58 kg Tournament Final	Tokyo, Japan	Decision (Unanimous)	3	3:00
For the Krush Featherweight Belt
2013-03-20	Win	(Japan) Shota Kanbe	Krush.27	Tokyo, Japan	Decision (Unanimous)	3	3:00
2013-01-26	Win	(Japan) KO-ICHI	Krush.26	Tokyo, Japan	TKO (Corner Stoppage)	3	1:04
2012-08-12	Win	(United Kingdom) Andy Howson	Krush.21	Tokyo, Japan	KO (Right Cross)	2	2:07
Wins the ISKA World Bantamweight title
2012-04-22	Win	(Japan) Namito Izawa	Krush－EX 2012 vol.1	Tokyo, Japan	Decision (Unanimous)	3	3:00
2012-01-09	Loss	(Japan) Shota Takiya	Krush 15	Tokyo, Japan	KO (Jumping Knee)	1	1:11
For the Krush Super Bantamweight Belt
2011-08-14	Win	(United Kingdom) Kieran McCaskill	Krush.11	Tokyo, Japan	Decision (Unanimous)	5	3:00
Wins the ISKA World Super Bantamweight title
2011-05-29	Win	(Korea) Ju Miho	Krush -70 kg Champion Inaugural Tournament ~First Round~	Tokyo, Japan	TKO (Punches)	1	2:04
2010-12-12	Loss	(Japan) Ryuya Kusakabe	Krush -55 kg Champion Inaugural Tournament ~First Round~	Tokyo, Japan	Decision (Unanimous)	3	3:00
2010-07-31	Win	(Japan) Makoto Kushima	RISE 68	Tokyo, Japan	Decision (Unanimous)	5	3:00
Defends the RISE Bantamweight title
2010-03-13	Win	(Japan) Kenji Kubo	Krush × Survivor	Tokyo, Japan	KO (Punches)	2	2:26
2009-11-22	Win	(Japan) TOMONORI	RISE 60	Tokyo, Japan	TKO (3 Knockdowns)	2	1:54
Wins the RISE Bantamweight title
2009-09-22	Win	(Japan) Takayuki Umehara	Krush.4	Tokyo, Japan	Decision (Unanimous)	3	3:00
2009-06-21	Loss	(Thailand) Norasing Lukbanyai	AJKF Norainu Dengekisakusen	Tokyo, Japan	TKO (3 Knockdowns)	2	1:12
2009-03-01	Win	(Japan) Hiroki Maeda	M-1 FAIRTEX Muay Thai Challenge 2009 Yod Nak Suu vol.1	Japan	TKO (Right Cross)	2	0:24
Wins the M-1 Bantamweight title
2009-01-04	Win	(Japan) Shota Takiya	AJKF NEW Year Kick Festival 2009, Bantamweight Championship Tournament final	Tokyo, Japan	Decision (Unanimous)	5	3:00
Wins the AJKF Bantamweight title
2009-01-04	Win	(Japan) Nasu	AJKF NEW Year Kick Festival 2009, Bantamweight Championship Tournament Semi final	Tokyo, Japan	Decision (Unanimous)	3	3:00
2008-11-08	Loss	(Thailand) Wanlop Weerasakreck	AJKF Krush！～Kickboxing Destruction～	Tokyo, Japan	Decision (Unanimous)	3	3:00
2008-08-10	Win	(Thailand) Rungrom Sikrom	M-1 FAIRTEX Muay Thai Challenge Legend of elbows 2008 ～YODMUAY～	Japan	TKO (Low Kicks)	2	1:11
2008-06-22	Win	(Japan) Nasu	AJKF	Tokyo, Japan	Ext.R Decision (Unanimous)	3	3:00
2008-03-09	Loss	(Thailand) Wanlop Weerasakreck	M-1 FAIRTEX Muay Thai Challenge Legend of elbows 2008 ～CRASH～	Japan	TKO (Doctor Stoppage)	1	1:49
2007-11-18	Win	(Japan) Shuichi Wentz	AJKF	Tokyo, Japan	KO (Low Kick)	3	1:51
2007-08-25	Loss	(Japan) Arashi Fujihara	AJKF Kick Return/Kickboxer of the best 60 Tournament ～First Round～	Tokyo, Japan	TKO (Towel thrown)	4	2:06
For the AJKF Bantamweight title
2007-06-09	Win	(Korea) Chae Jin Soon	AJKF CUB☆KICK’S-6	Tokyo, Japan	KO (Punches)	1	2:59
2007-04-15	Win	(Japan) Hideya Nagasaki	AJKF New Deal	Tokyo, Japan	Decision (Unanimous)	3	3:00
2007-01-08	Win	(Japan) Yuzo Maki	J-NETWORK The Starting Point of J	Tokyo, Japan	KO (Flying knee)	2	1:16
2006-09-24	Loss	(Japan) Takashi Yoneda	NJKF 55 kg Championship Tournament, Semi Final	Tokyo, Japan	Decision (Unanimous)	5	3:00
2006-07-22	Win	(Japan) Shinji	NJKF 55 kg Championship Tournament, Quarter Final	Tokyo, Japan	Decision (Unanimous)	5	3:00
2006-05-14	Win	(Japan) Shinji	AJKF CROSSOVER	Japan	Decision (Unanimous)	3	3:00
2006-03-19	Win	(Japan) Makoto Warisawa	AJKF SWORD FIGHT 2006～Japan VS Thailand・5vs5	Japan	KO (Punches)	1	1:01
2005-12-17	Win	(Thailand) Kongtanan Petchyindee	Lumpinee Stadium, Krikkri Fights	Bangkok, Thailand	KO	2	
2005-09-16	Win	(Japan) Naoki Tsuji	AJKF STACK OF ARMS	Japan	Decision (Unanimous)	3	3:00
2005-07-24	Win	(Korea) Kwon Minseok	AJKF SUPER FIGHT	Japan	Decision (Unanimous)	3	3:00
2005-04-23	Win	(England) Reece Crooke	PAIN and GLORY	England	TKO (Doctor stoppage)	3	
2005-03-02	Loss	(Japan) Kunitaka Fujiwara	J-NETWORK GO! GO! J-NET ’05 -MACH 5-Tournament, Quarter Finals	Japan	TKO	3	2:45
2005-02-06	Win	(Japan) Miki Urabayashi	AJKF MOVING	Japan	Decision (Unanimous)	3	3:00
2004-11-14	Win	(Japan) Keiji Chiba	J-NETWORK UNLIMITED 11.14 -MasterX Collabo-	Japan	Decision (Unanimous)	3	3:00
2004-09-23	Win	(Japan) Hiroaki Mizuhara	AJKF DANGER ZONE	Japan	KO	3	2:53
2004-05-16	Draw	(Japan) Hiroaki Mizuhara	AJKF DANGER ZONE	Japan	Decision	3	3:00
2004-03-28	Win	(Japan) Masaru Fujii	J-NETWORK Kick Squad 2	Japan	Decision (Unanimous)	3	3:00
2003-12-07	Win	(Japan) Koichi Ueyama	AJKF Fujiwara Festival	Japan	Decision (Unanimous)	3	3:00
Legend: Win Loss Draw/No contest Notes

== See also ==
- List of male kickboxers
