= 2014 in K-1 =

Mixed martial arts events

Information
- First date: January 11
- Last date: November 3

Events
- Total events: 7

Fights

Chronology
2013 in K-1	2014 in K-1	2015 in K-1

This is a list of events held in 2014 by K-1.

== K-1 World MAX World Championship Tournament Quarter-final in Gran Canaria ==
K-1 World MAX World Championship Tournament Quarter-final in Gran Canaria
- Promotion: K-1
- Date: January 11, 2014
- Venue: Pabellón Insular Rita Hernández
- City: Gran Canaria, Spain

K-1 World MAX World Championship Tournament Quarter-final in Gran Canaria was a kickboxing event promoted by K-1. It was held on October 11, 2014 at Pabellón Insular Rita Hernández in Gran Canaria, Spain.

=== Results ===
Main Card
Weight Class				Method	Round	Time	Notes
70 kg	(Germany) Enriko Kehl	def.	(Spain) Maximo Suarez	Decision (Unanimous)	3	3:00	K-1 World MAX 2014 Quarter Final
70 kg	(South Korea) Lee Sung-hyun	def.	(Senegal) Elam Ngor	Decision (Split)	3	3:00	K-1 World MAX 2014 Quarter Final
70 kg	(England) Chad Sugden	def.	(Spain) Jorge Falcon	KO	1
Heavyweight	(Spain) Moisés Baute	def.	(Sweden) Tofan Pirani	KO (Punches)	1
77 kg	(Spain) Juanma Suarez	def.	(Spain) David de Bejear	Decision (Split)	3	3:00
70 kg	(Spain) Alejandro Rodriguez	def.	(Azerbaijan) Tural Bayramov	KO (Knee)	2	2:22

== K-1 World MAX 2014 World Championship Tournament Final 4 ==
K-1 World MAX 2014 World Championship Tournament Final 4
- Promotion: K-1; Best of the Best
- Date: February 23, 2014
- Venue: Sarhadchi Olympic Sport Complex
- City: Baku, Azerbaijan

K-1 World MAX 2014 World Championship Tournament Final 4 was a kickboxing event promoted by K-1. It was held on February 23, 2014 at Pabellón Insular Rita Hernández in Gran Canaria, Spain.

=== Results ===
Main Card
Weight Class				Method	Round	Time	Notes
70 kg	(Thailand) Buakaw Banchamek	def.	(South Korea) Lee Sung-hyun	Decision (Unanimous)	3	3:00	K-1 World MAX 2014 Semi Final
70 kg	(Germany) Enriko Kehl	def.	(Canada) Shane Campbell	Decision (Unanimous)	3	3:00	K-1 World MAX 2014 Semi Final
71 kg	(Azerbaijan) Alim Nabiev	def.	(England) Chad Sugden	Decision (Unanimous)	3	3:00
71 kg	(Netherlands) Cedric Manhoef	def.	(Azerbaijan) Ismat Agazade	Decision (Unanimous)	3	3:00
72 kg	(Azerbaijan) Tural Bayramov	def.	(Germany) Marco Groh	Decision (Unanimous)	3	3:00
63 kg	(Netherlands) Zakaria Zouggary	def.	(Azerbaijan) Aamil Sahmarazade	TKO	2
85 kg	(Turkey) Samet Keser	def.	(Romania) Daniel Lazer	Decision	3	3:00
85 kg	(Russia) Ruslan Kobzev	def.	(Netherlands) Denis Ipema	Decision	3	3:00
Heavyweight	(Suriname) Colin George	def.	(Azerbaijan) Samir Kazimov	TKO	1
70 kg	(Azerbaijan) Ziya Bayramov	def.	(Morocco) Omar El Amrani	TKO	3

== K-1 World MAX 2014 World Championship Tournament Final ==
K-1 World MAX 2014 World Championship Tournament Final
- The poster for K-1 World MAX 2014 World Championship Tournament Final
- Promotion: K-1
- Date: October 11, 2014
- Venue: Indoor Athletic Stadium
- City: Pattaya, Thailand

Event chronology
K-1 Santaella	K-1 World MAX 2014 World Championship Tournament Final

K-1 World MAX 2014 World Championship Tournament Final was a kickboxing event promoted by K-1 originally scheduled to be held on July 26, 2014 in Pattaya, Thailand, but delayed due to the turbulent political climate in Thailand; it was ultimately held on October 11, 2014. The winner was Enriko Kehl.

A controversial event occurred during the fight between Buakaw and Enriko Kehl. After 3 rounds of action, Buakaw left the building without hearing the judges verdict (a 4th round was declared), and so the German fighter was declared winner by forfeit.

=== Results ===
- K-1 World Max Final : (Germany) Enriko Kehl def. (Thailand) Buakaw Banchamek via forfeit (extra round)
- Superfight : (United Kingdom) Paul Daley def. (Iran) Mohammad Ghaedibardeh via unanimous decision (round 3)
- Superfight : (Spain) Maximo Suárez def. (Azerbaijan) Tural Bayramov via TKO (round 2)
- Superfight : (Brazil) Andre Dida Amade def. (China) Li Yankun via majority decision (round 3)
- Superfight : (China) Xie Lei def. (Japan) Kouji Yoshimoto via unanimous decision (round 3)
- Superfight : (Thailand) Petchmankong Petsaman def. (Russia) Artem Pashporin via majority decision (round 3)
- Superfight : (South Korea) Lee Sung-Hyun def. (Belarus) Andrei Kulebin via unanimous decision (extra round)
- Superfight : (Thailand) Rungravee Sasiprapa def. (Canada) Denis Puric via unanimous decision (round 3)

== K-1 World MAX 2014 Bracket ==
First Round (2013-09-14)
(Thailand)	Buakaw Banchamek	TKO
(Spain)	David Calvo	R1
(China)	Zhou Zhipeng	DEC
(United States)	Joey Pagliuso	R3
(Azerbaijan)	Ismat Aghazade^{1}	R3
(Senegal)	Elam Ngor	KO
(South Korea)	Lee Sung-Hyun	DEC
(France)	Charles François	R3
(Canada)	Shane Campbell	KO
(Brazil)	Wallace Lopes	R1
(Netherlands)	Andy Souwer	DEC
(Japan)	Yasuhiro Kido	R3
(Netherlands)	Henri van Opstal	R3
(Germany)	Enriko Kehl	DEC
(Spain)	Maximo Suárez	DEC
(Romania)	Miodrag Olar	R3

Quarter Finals (2013-12-28 / 2014-01-11)
(Thailand)	Buakaw Banchamek	DEC
(China)	Zhou Zhipeng	R4^{2}
(Senegal)	Elam Ngor	R3
(South Korea)	Lee Sung-Hyun	DEC
(Canada)	Shane Campbell	DEC
(Colombia)	Christopher Mena^{3}	R3
(Germany)	Enriko Kehl	DEC
(Spain)	Maximo Suárez	R3

Semi Finals (2014-02-23)
(Thailand)	Buakaw Banchamek	DEC
(South Korea)	Lee Sung-Hyun	R3
(Canada)	Shane Campbell	R3
(Germany)	Enriko Kehl	DEC

Final (2014-10-11)
(Thailand)	Buakaw Banchamek	R4^{4}
(Germany)	Enriko Kehl	DQ

^{1} Mike Zambidis was set to face Elam Ngor, but he decided to pull himself out due to some terms and conditions disagreements, and was replaced by Ismat Aghazade.
^{2} Extended Round
^{3} Andy Souwer withdrew from the tournament due to appendicitis and was replaced by Christopher Mena.
^{4} Extended Round; Buakaw Banchamek refused to fight and walked out.

== K-1 World GP 2014 –65 kg Championship Tournament ==
K-1 World GP 2014 -65kg Championship Tournament
- Promotion: K-1
- Date: November 3, 2014
- Venue: Yoyogi National Gymnasium
- City: Tokyo, Japan

K-1 World GP 2014 –65 kg Championship Tournament was a kickboxing event held on November 3, 2014, at the Yoyogi National Gymnasium in Tokyo, Japan.

It was the first K-1 event to be held by the Japan-based "K-1 World GP Japan", which is produced by M-1 Sports Media.

=== Background ===
This event featured 8-Man tournament for the inaugural K-1 -65kg Championship, and other super fights.

=== Results ===
Main Card
Weight Class				Method	Round	Time	Notes
65 kg	(Thailand) Kaew Fairtex	def.	(Japan) Yasuomi Soda	Decision (majority)	3	3:00	-65 kg Tournament Final; For the -65kg Championship
70 kg	(United Kingdom) Kerrith Bhella	def.	(Japan) Yuya Yamamoto	Decision (majority)	3	3:00
55 kg	(Japan) Takeru Segawa	def.	(Japan) Taiga	KO (Spinning backfist)	3	0:13
65 kg	(Thailand) Kaew Fairtex	def.	(Japan) Yuta Kubo	KO (Left hook)	2	1:52	-65 kg Tournament Semi Final
65 kg	(Japan) Yasuomi Soda	def.	(Japan) Hiroya	Decision (majority)	3	3:00	-65 kg Tournament Semi Final
65 kg	(Japan) Ren Hiramoto	def.	(Japan) Sano Tenma	Extra round decision (unanimous)	4	3:00	K-1 Koshien 2014 Final
70 kg	(Japan) Shintaro Matsukura	def.	(China) Jiao Fukai	Decision (unanimous)	3	3:00
65 kg	(Japan) Yuta Kubo	def.	(Armenia) Raz Sarkisjan	Decision (unanimous)	3	3:00	-65 kg Tournament Quarter Final
65 kg	(Thailand) Kaew Fairtex	def.	(Japan) Hideaki Yamazaki	Decision (unanimous)	3	3:00	-65 kg Tournament Quarter Final
65 kg	(Japan) Yasuomi Soda	def.	(Brazil) Minoru Kimura	KO	2	2:43	-65 kg Tournament Quarter Final
65 kg	(Japan) Hiroya	def.	(Australia) Michael Thompson	Decision (majority)	3	3:00	-65 kg Tournament Quarter Final
65 kg	(Morocco) Ilias Bulaid	def.	(Japan) Taito	KO	3	2:32	-65 kg Tournament Reserve Fight
Preliminary Card
Weight Class				Method	Round	Time	Notes
55 kg	(Japan) Ryuma Tobe	def.	(Japan) Yuya Suzuki	Decision (majority)	3	3:00
Heavyweight	(Japan) Hitoshi Sugimoto	def.	(Japan) Shota Fujii	KO	2	1:57
60 kg	(Japan) Kaito Ozawa	def.	(Japan) Kento Ito	KO	2	1:52

=== K-1 World GP 2014 -65kg Championship Tournament bracket ===
Quarter-finals
(Japan) Hiroya	DEC
(Australia) Michael Thompson	2-0
(Japan) Yasuomi Soda	KO
(Brazil) Minoru Kimura	2R.
(Japan) Hideaki Yamazaki	3-0
(Thailand) Kaew Fairtex	DEC
(Japan) Yuta Kubo	DEC
(Armenia) Raz Sarkisjan	3-0

Semi-finals
(Japan) Hiroya	2-0
(Japan) Yasuomi Soda	DEC
(Thailand) Kaew Fairtex	KO
(Japan) Yuta Kubo	2R.

Final
(Japan) Yasuomi Soda	2-0
(Thailand) Kaew Fairtex	DEC

== See also ==
- List of K-1 events
- List of K-1 champions
- List of male kickboxers
