= Daizo Sasaki =

Japanese kickboxer

- Born: 佐々木 大蔵; November 20, 1990 (age 35); Machida, Tokyo, Japan
- Height: 173 cm (5 ft 8 in)
- Weight: 65.0 kg (143.3 lb; 10.24 st)
- Division: Super Bantamweight
- Style: Kickboxing
- Stance: Orthodox
- Fighting out of: Tokyo, Japan
- Team: DyR Studio (2025 - Present); K-1 Gym Sagami-Ono KREST (2016-2025); K-1 Gym Team Dragon (2009-2016)
- Years active: 2009 - present

Kickboxing record
- Total: 57
- Wins: 34
- By knockout: 8
- Losses: 22
- By knockout: 5
- Draws: 1

Other information
- Website: https://s-daizo.com/index.html

Daizo Sasaki (born 20 November 1990) is a Japanese kickboxer, currently competing in the super lightweight divisions of Krush and K-1. He is the former Krush Super Lightweight champion, the former Krush Lightweight champion, the 2018 K-1 Super Lightweight Grand Prix finalist and a one-time K-1 World GP Super Lightweight title challenger.

As of June 2022, Sasaki is the #6 ranked featherweight in the world according to Combat Press. He's been continuously ranked in the featherweight top ten since February 2021.

== Kickboxing career ==
=== Lightweight career ===
==== Krush lightweight tournament ====
At a press conference held by Krush on December 2, 2015, it was announced that Sasaki would be one of eight participants in the 2016 Krush lightweight tournament, held to fill the throne left vacant by Hideaki Yamazaki. Sasaki faced Hisaki Higashimoto at Krush 62 on January 17, 2016, in the tournament quarterfinals. He won the fight by majority decision. Two of the judges scored the fight 30–29 in his favor, while the third judge scored it an even 30–30 draw.

Advancing to the tournament semifinals, held at Krush 64 on March 20, 2016, Sasaki was booked to face Takayuki Minamino. He won the fight by unanimous decision, with the judges scoring the bout 30–29 for him, while the third judge awarded him a 30–28 scorecard. Sasaki faced the 2014 K-1 Koshien super lightweight champion Ren Hiramoto in the tournament finals, in the main event of Krush 66 on June 12, 2016. He won the fight by majority decision, with two scorecards of 29–28 and one scorecard of 29–29.

==== Krush lightweight title reign ====
Sasaki made his first title defense against Hiroto Iwasaki, in the co-main event of Krush.70 on October 15, 2016. He won the fight by unanimous decision, with scores of 30–28, 30–27 and 30–26. He scored the sole knockdown of the fight in the second round, dropping Iwasaki with a right hook.

Sasaki was booked to face Wei Rui in the quarterfinals of the 2017 K-1 World GP Lightweight Championship Tournament, held on February 25, 2017. He lost to the eventual tournament winner by a second-round knockout.

Sasaki made his second Krush lightweight title defense against Toshiki Taniyama at Krush 78 on August 6, 2017. He won the fight by unanimous decision.

Sasaki faced Ren Hiramoto at K-1 World GP 2017 Heavyweight Championship Tournament on November 23, 2017. The bout was a rematch of their Krush 66 fight, which Sasaki won by majority decision. He was less successful in their second meeting, as Hiramoto won the fight by unanimous decision.

Sasaki made his third Krush title defense against Gonnapar Weerasakreck at Krush.87 on April 22, 2017. Gonnapar won the fight by unanimous decision, with all three judges scoring the fight 30–26 in his favor. Sasaki was knocked down in the third round, as Gonnapar dropped him with a right hook.

=== Super Lightweight career ===
==== K-1 Super Lightweight Grand Prix ====
Sasaki faced Wang Zhiwei in a -64 kg catchweight bout in his next bout, at Krush.90 on July 22, 2018. He won the fight by unanimous decision, with two scorecards of 30–29 and one scorecard of 30–28. After successfully rebounding from his title loss, it was revealed that Sasaki would participate in the 2018 K-1 World GP Super Lightweight Championship Tournament on November 3, 2018. He was booked to face Sam Hill in the tournament quarterfinals.

Sasaki won the quarterfinal bout against Sam Hill by unanimous decision, with scores of 30–28, 30–28 and 30–27. He faced the former Krush super lightweight champion Jun Nakazawa in the penultimate bout of the tournament. Sasaki won the fight by unanimous decision as well. Sasaki faced the two-time K-1 super lightweight tournament winner Kaew Fairtex in the tournament finals. He lost the fight by unanimous decision, with two judges scoring the fight 30–29 for Kaew, while the third judge scored the bout 29–28 in his favor.

==== Pre-Krush title reign bouts ====
Sasaki was booked to fight the Rukiya Anpo at K-1 World GP 2019: K'FESTA 2 on March 10, 2019. Anpo won the fight by unanimous decision, with scores of 30–27, 30-27 and 29–28.

Sasaki faced the former RISE Lightweight and KNOCK OUT Super Lightweight champion Fukashi Mizutani at K-1 World GP 2019: Super Bantamweight World Tournament on June 30, 2019. He won the fight by a third-round technical knockout. He cut Fukashi with a spinning backfist in the second round, which prompted the referee to call in the ringside physician, who allowed the fight to go on. The doctor was called in the more times before the fight was finally waved off near the end of the third round. Although Fukashi complained that he was hit with the forearm instead of the back of the fist, both the referee and K-1 producer Takumi Nakamura deemed the strike to have been legal.

==== Krush Super Lightweight champion ====
Sasaki faced the Krush Super Lightweight champion Hayato Suzuki in a non-title bout at K-1 World GP 2019 Yokohamatsuri on November 24, 2019. He won the fight by unanimous decision, with scores of 30–28, 30–28 and 29–28. An immediate rematch was booked for Krush.111 on February 24, 2020, with Suzuki's Krush Super lightweight title on the line. He won the fight by unanimous decision, with all three judge scoring the bout 30–26 in his favor. Sasaki scored the sole knockdown of the fight in the second round, dropping Suzuki with a right hook.

Sasaki made the first defense of his newly acquired title against the 2016 K-1 Koshien super lightweight champion Kensei Kondo. The bout was scheduled as the main event of Krush 114, which took place on July 11, 2020. He won the fight by a dominant unanimous decision, with all three judges awarding him a 30–26 scorecard.

Sasaki faced Kota Nakano in a non-title bout at Krush.118 on October 17, 2020. He won the fight by unanimous decision, with scores of 29–28, 29–28 and 30–28. Sasaki returned to K-1 for his next bout, as he was booked to face Tetsuya Yamato at K-1 World GP 2020 Winter's Crucial Bout on December 13, 2020. He won the fight by a unanimous decision, with two judges scoring the bout 30–29 in his favor, while the third one scored it 30–28 for him.

Sasaki made his second Krush title defense against Jin Hirayama at Krush 125 on May 30, 2021. He won the fight by unanimous decision, with scores of 30–29, 30–28 and 30–28.

Sasaki faced the former K-1 Lightweight titleholder Kenta Hayashi at K-1 World GP 2021: Yokohamatsuri on September 20, 2021. He won the fight by unanimous decision. Sasaki was next booked to face Vitor Tofanelli at K-1 World GP 2022 Japan on February 27, 2022. He won the fight by unanimous decision.

Sasaki made his third Krush title defense against Hikaru Terashima in the main event of Krush.138 on June 17, 2022. He won the fight by a third-round technical knockout, stopping Terashima with a flurry of punches, after having knocked him down once previously in the round.

Sasaki challenged the reigning K-1 Super Lightweight titleholder Tetsuya Yamato at K-1 World GP 2022 Yokohamatsuri on June 17, 2022. The title bout was a rematch two years in the making, as Sasaki had 5reviously beaten Yamato by unanimous decision at K-1 World GP 2020 Winter's Crucial Bout on December 13, 2020. He lost the rematch by unanimous decision, with scores of 30–28, 30–28 and 29–28.

Sasaki vacated the Krush super lightweight title on December 16, 2022.

==== Post title reign ====
Sasaki faced the former RISE Lightweight champion Taiju Shiratori at RISE EL DORADO 2023 on March 26, 2023. He lost the fight by unanimous decision, with all three ringside officials scoring the bout 30–28 for Shiratori.

Sasaki faced Pakorn P.K. Saenchai Muaythaigym at K-1 World GP 2023 in Yokohama on June 3, 2023. He lost the fight by split decision, after an extra fourth round was contested.

Sasaki faced Hikaru Terashima at Krush.160 on April 28, 2024. He won the fight by a first-round knockout.

Sasaki faced Koya Saito in a super lightweight tournament reserve bout at K-1 World MAX 2024 on September 29, 2024. He won the fight by unanimous decision, with three scorecards of 30–26 in his favor.

Sasaki faced Shu Inagaki at K-1 World MAX 2025 on February 9, 2025.

== Titles and accomplishments ==
Professional

- K-1
  - 2018 K-1 World Super Lightweight Tournament runner-up
- Krush
  - 2016 Krush Lightweight (-63 kg) Championship
    - Two successful title defenses
  - 2020 Krush Super Lightweight (-65 kg) Championship
    - Three successful title defenses
  - Most wins in Krush title bouts (7)
  - Tied second most consecutive Krush title defenses (3)

== Kickboxing record ==
Kickboxing record
35 Wins (8 (T)KO's), 22 Losses, 1 Draw, 0 No Contest
Date	Result	Opponent	Event	Location	Method	Round	Time
2026-04-11	Loss	(Senegal) Alassane Kamara	K-1 Genki 2026	Tokyo, Japan	TKO (Doctor stoppage)	1	2:28
2025-05-31	Win	(Japan) Kensei Kondo	K-1 Beyond	Yokohama, Japan	Ext.R Decision (Unanimous)	4	3:00
2025-02-09	Loss	(Japan) Shu Inagaki	K-1 World MAX 2025	Tokyo, Japan	Decision (Unanimous)	3	3:00
2024-12-14	Win	(Japan) Takuma Tsukamoto	K-1 World Grand Prix 2024 Final	Tokyo, Japan	Decision (Unanimous)	3	3:00
2024-09-29	Win	(Japan) Koya Saito	K-1 World MAX 2024 - Tournament reserve fight	Tokyo, Japan	Decision (Unanimous)	3	3:00
2024-04-28	Win	(Japan) Hikaru Terashima	Krush.160	Tokyo, Japan	KO (Punches)	1	2:19
2023-06-03	Loss	(Thailand) Pakorn P.K. Saenchai Muaythaigym	K-1 World GP 2023 in Yokohama	Yokohama, Japan	Ext.R Decision (Split)	4	3:00
2023-03-26	Loss	(Japan) Taiju Shiratori	RISE ELDORADO 2023	Tokyo, Japan	Decision (Unanimous)	3	3:00
2022-09-11	Loss	(Japan) Tetsuya Yamato	K-1 World GP 2022 Yokohamatsuri	Yokohama, Japan	Decision (Unanimous)	3	3:00
For the K-1 World GP Super Lightweight (-65kg) title.
2022-06-17	Win	(Japan) Hikaru Terashima	Krush.138	Tokyo, Japan	TKO (Ref.stoppage/punches)	3	1:31
Defends Krush Super Lightweight (-65kg) title.
2022-02-27	Win	(Brazil) Vitor Tofanelli	K-1 World GP 2022 Japan	Tokyo, Japan	Decision (Unanimous)	3	3:00
2021-09-20	Win	(Japan) Kenta Hayashi	K-1 World GP 2021: Yokohamatsuri	Yokohama, Japan	Decision (Unanimous)	3	3:00
2021-05-30	Win	(Japan) Jin Hirayama	Krush.125	Tokyo, Japan	Decision (Unanimous)	3	3:00
Defends Krush Super Lightweight (-65kg) title.
2020-12-13	Win	(Japan) Tetsuya Yamato	K-1 World GP 2020 Winter's Crucial Bout	Tokyo, Japan	Decision (Unanimous)	3	3:00
2020-10-17	Win	(Japan) Kota Nakano	Krush.118	Tokyo, Japan	Decision (Unanimous)	3	3:00
2020-07-11	Win	(Japan) Kensei Kondo	Krush.114	Tokyo, Japan	Decision (Unanimous)	3	3:00
Defends the Krush Super Lightweight (-65kg) title.
2020-02-24	Win	(Japan) Hayato Suzuki	Krush.111	Tokyo, Japan	Decision (Unanimous)	3	3:00
Wins the Krush Super Lightweight (-65kg) title.
2019-11-24	Win	(Japan) Hayato Suzuki	K-1 World GP 2019 Yokohamatsuri	Yokohama, Japan	Decision (Unanimous)	3	3:00
2019-06-30	Win	(Japan) Fukashi	K-1 World GP 2019: Super Bantamweight World Tournament	Saitama, Japan	TKO (Doctor Stoppage)	3	2:14
2019-03-10	Loss	(Japan) Rukiya Anpo	K-1 World GP 2019: K’FESTA 2	Saitama, Japan	Decision (Unanimous)	3	3:00
2018-11-03	Loss	(Thailand) Kaew Fairtex	K-1 World GP 2018: Super Lightweight Championship Tournament, Final	Saitama, Japan	Decision (Unanimous)	3	3:00
For the K-1 World GP Super Lightweight (-65kg) title.
2018-11-03	Win	(Japan) Jun Nakazawa	K-1 World GP 2018: Super Lightweight Championship Tournament, Semifinals	Saitama, Japan	Decision (Unanimous)	3	3:00
2018-11-03	Win	(New Zealand) Sam Hill	K-1 World GP 2018: Super Lightweight Championship Tournament, Quarterfinals	Saitama, Japan	Decision (Unanimous)	3	3:00
2018-07-22	Win	(China) Wang Zhiwei	Krush.90	Tokyo, Japan	Decision (Unanimous)	3	3:00
2018-04-22	Loss	(Thailand) Kongnapa Weerasakreck	Krush.87	Tokyo, Japan	Decision (Unanimous)	3	3:00
Loses the Krush Lightweight title.
2017-11-23	Loss	(Japan) Ren Hiramoto	K-1 World GP 2017 Heavyweight Championship Tournament	Saitama, Japan	Decision (Unanimous)	3	3:00
2017-08-06	Win	(Japan) Toshiki Taniyama	Krush.78	Tokyo, Japan	Decision (Unanimous)	3	3:00
Defends the Krush Lightweight title.
2017-06-03	Win	(China) Jin Ying	Wu Lin Feng 2017: China VS Japan	Changsha, China	Decision (Split)	3	3:00
2017-02-25	Loss	(China) Wei Rui	K-1 World GP 2017 Lightweight Championship Tournament, Quarterfinals	Tokyo, Japan	KO (Left Hook)	2	1:04
2016-10-15	Win	(Japan) Hiroto Iwasaki	Krush.70	Tokyo, Japan	Decision (Unanimous)	3	3:00
Defends the Krush Lightweight title.
2016-06-12	Win	(Japan) Ren Hiramoto	Krush 66: -63 kg Tournament, Final	Tokyo, Japan	Decision (Majority)	3	3:00
Wins the vacant Krush Lightweight Title.
2016-03-20	Win	(Japan) Takayuki Minamino	Krush 64: -63 kg Tournament, Semifinals	Tokyo, Japan	Decision (Unanimous)	3	3:00
2016-01-17	Win	(Japan) Hisaki Higashimoto	Krush 62: -63 kg Tournament, Quarterfinals	Tokyo, Japan	Decision (Majority)	3	3:00
2015-10-04	Win	(Japan) Naoki Terasaki	Krush 59	Tokyo, Japan	Decision (Unanimous)	3	3:00
2015-04-12	Loss	(Japan) Hiroto Iwasaki	Krush 53	Tokyo, Japan	Decision (Unanimous)	3	3:00
2015-01-04	Loss	(Japan) Ryuki Iwashita	Krush 49	Tokyo, Japan	Decision (Unanimous)	3	3:00
2014-11-09	Win	(Japan) Taro Hayasaka	Krush 47	Tokyo, Japan	KO (Punches)	1	2:46
2014-09-08	Win	(China) Zhang Jouweng		China	KO	1	
2014-03-08	Loss	(Brazil) Minoru Kimura	Krush 39	Tokyo, Japan	TKO (3 Knockdowns/Punches)	1	2:49
2013-11-10	Win	(Japan) Ikki	Krush 34	Tokyo, Japan	Decision (Unanimous)	3	3:00
2013-08-11	Win	(Japan) Joe Utsunomiya	Krush 30	Tokyo, Japan	KO (Punches & Knee)	1	2:51
2013-06-02	Win	(Japan) Kengo Sonoda	Krush-IGNITION 2013 vol.4	Japan	Decision (Unanimous)	3	3:00
2013-03-03	Loss	(Brazil) Minoru Kimura	Krush-IGNITION 2013 vol.2	Japan	KO (Left Hook)	1	2:19
2012-12-14	Win	(Japan) Yuki Izuka	Krush 25	Japan	Decision (Unanimous)	3	3:00
2012-09-09	Loss	(Japan) Hisaki Higashimoto	Krush YOUTH GP 2012, Final	Japan	Decision	3	3:00
2012-09-09	Win	(Japan) Yuya	Krush YOUTH GP 2012, Semi Final	Japan	Decision (Majority)	3	3:00
2012-07-21	Loss	(Japan) Hiroya	Krush.20	Tokyo, Japan	KO (Low Kick)	3	2:43
2012-06-08	Loss	(Japan) Atsushi Ogata	Krush.19	Tokyo, Japan	Decision (Majority)	3	3:00
2011-12-09	Loss	(Japan) Kengo Sonoda	Krush.14	Tokyo, Japan	Decision (Unanimous)	3	3:00
2011-10-10	Loss	(Japan) Masaaki Noiri	Krush 2011 Under-22 ~63 kg Supernova~ Tournament, Semifinals	Tokyo, Japan	KO (left hook to the body)	2	1:42
2011-10-10	Win	(Japan) Shota	Krush 2011 Under-22 ~63 kg Supernova~ Tournament, Quarterfinals	Tokyo, Japan	KO	3	1:24
2011-07-16	Win	(Japan) Hayato Uesugi	Krush -70 kg Inaugural Tournament	Tokyo, Japan	Decision (Majority)	3	3:00
2010-10-31	Loss	(Japan) "Dynamite" Takahashi Yuta	Krush-EX ～Road to the Championship～	Tokyo, Japan	Decision (Unanimous)	3	3:00
2010-08-14	Draw	(Japan) Shunta	Krush.9	Tokyo, Japan	Decision	3	3:00
2010-05-27	Loss	(Japan) Tsuyoshi Nakashima	Krush.7	Tokyo, Japan	Decision (Unanimous)	3	3:00
2010-02-19	Loss	(Japan) Yuki Matsuno	Krush-EX 2010 vol.1	Tokyo, Japan	Decision (Unanimous)	3	3:00
2009-12-04	Win	(Japan) Shinichiro Ishii	Krush-EX	Tokyo, Japan	Decision (Unanimous)	3	3:00
2009-10-12	Win	(Japan) Takuya Kurokawa	Krush-EX	Tokyo, Japan	Decision (Unanimous)	3	3:00
2009-05-17	Win	(Japan) Yuki Hayano	Krush.3	Tokyo, Japan	KO	2	2:31
Legend: Win Loss Draw/No contest Notes

Amateur kickboxing record
Date	Result	Opponent	Event	Location	Method	Round	Time
2008-12-31	Loss	(Japan) Taishi Hiratsuka	Dynamite!! 2008 K-1 Koshien 2008 Tournament reserve fight	Saitama, Japan	KO	2	1:00
2008-10-01	Loss	(Japan) Ryuya Kusakabe	K-1 World MAX 2008 World Championship Tournament Final K-1 Koshien 2008 Tournament, Quarterfinals	Tokyo, Japan	KO (Left High Kick)	1	2:43
2008-08-29	Win	(Japan) Kota Kobayashi	K-1 Koshien KING OF UNDER 18 〜FINAL16〜	Tokyo, Japan	Decision (Unanimous)	3	3:00
2008-07-21	Loss	(Japan) Koya Urabe	K-1 Koshien Kanto Area Selection Tournament, Final	Tokyo, Japan	Decision (Unanimous)	1	2:00
2007-12-22	Draw	(Japan) Masaaki Noiri	Team Dragon sponsored box-off "Burning Dragon! Part 1" Amateur Challenge Match	Tokyo, Japan	Decision (Unanimous)	1	3:00

Legend: Win Loss Draw/No contest Notes |}

== See also ==
- List of male kickboxers
