= K-1 World GP 2014 -65kg Championship Tournament =

K-1 martial arts event in 2014

- The poster for K-1 World GP 2014 -65kg Championship Tournament
- Promotion: K-1
- Date: November 3, 2014
- Venue: Yoyogi National Gymnasium
- City: Tokyo, Japan

Event chronology
K-1 World MAX 2014 World Championship Tournament Final	K-1 World GP 2014 -65kg Championship Tournament	K-1 China vs. USA

K-1 World GP 2014 –65 kg Championship Tournament was a kickboxing event held on November 3, 2014, at the Yoyogi National Gymnasium in Tokyo, Japan.

It was the first K-1 event to be held by the Japan-based "K-1 World GP Japan", which is produced by M-1 Sports Media.

== Background ==
This event featured 8-Man tournament for the inaugural K-1 -65kg Championship, and other super fights.

== Results ==
Main Card
Weight Class				Method	Round	Time	Notes
65 kg	(Thailand) Kaew Fairtex	def.	(Japan) Yasuomi Soda	Decision (majority)	3	3:00	-65 kg Tournament Final; For the -65kg Championship
70 kg	(United Kingdom) Kerrith Bhella	def.	(Japan) Yuya Yamamoto	Decision (majority)	3	3:00
55 kg	(Japan) Takeru Segawa	def.	(Japan) Taiga	KO	3	0:13
65 kg	(Thailand) Kaew Fairtex	def.	(Japan) Yuta Kubo	KO	2	1:52	-65 kg Tournament Semi Final
65 kg	(Japan) Yasuomi Soda	def.	(Japan) Hiroya	Decision (majority)	3	3:00	-65 kg Tournament Semi Final
65 kg	(Japan) Ren Hiramoto	def.	(Japan) Sano Tenma	Extra round decision (unanimous)	4	3:00	K-1 Koshien 2014 Final
70 kg	(Japan) Shintaro Matsukura	def.	(China) Jiao Fukai	Decision (unanimous)	3	3:00
65 kg	(Japan) Yuta Kubo	def.	(Armenia) Raz Sarkisjan	Decision (unanimous)	3	3:00	-65 kg Tournament Quarter Final
65 kg	(Thailand) Kaew Fairtex	def.	(Japan) Hideaki Yamazaki	Decision (unanimous)	3	3:00	-65 kg Tournament Quarter Final
65 kg	(Japan) Yasuomi Soda	def.	(Brazil) Minoru Kimura	KO	2	2:43	-65 kg Tournament Quarter Final
65 kg	(Japan) Hiroya	def.	(Australia) Michael Thompson	Decision (majority)	3	3:00	-65 kg Tournament Quarter Final
65 kg	(Morocco) Ilias Bulaid	def.	(Japan) Yasuto Taito	KO	3	2:32	-65 kg Tournament Reserve Fight
Preliminary Card
Weight Class				Method	Round	Time	Notes
55 kg	(Japan) Ryuma Tobe	def.	(Japan) Yuya Suzuki	Decision (majority)	3	3:00
Heavyweight	(Japan) Hitoshi Sugimoto	def.	(Japan) Shota Fujii	KO	2	1:57
60 kg	(Japan) Kaito Ozawa	def.	(Japan) Kento Ito	KO	2	1:52

== K-1 World GP 2014 -65kg Championship Tournament bracket ==
Quarter-finals
(Japan) Hiroya	DEC
(Australia) Michael Thompson	2-0
(Japan) Yasuomi Soda	KO
(Brazil) Minoru Kimura	2R.
(Japan) Hideaki Yamazaki	3-0
(Thailand) Kaew Fairtex	DEC
(Japan) Yuta Kubo	DEC
(Armenia) Raz Sarkisjan	3-0

Semi-finals
(Japan) Hiroya	2-0
(Japan) Yasuomi Soda	DEC
(Thailand) Kaew Fairtex	KO
(Japan) Yuta Kubo	2R.

Final
(Japan) Yasuomi Soda	2-0
(Thailand) Kaew Fairtex	DEC

== See also ==
- List of K-1 events
- List of K-1 champions
