= Ren Hiramoto =

Japanese kickboxer

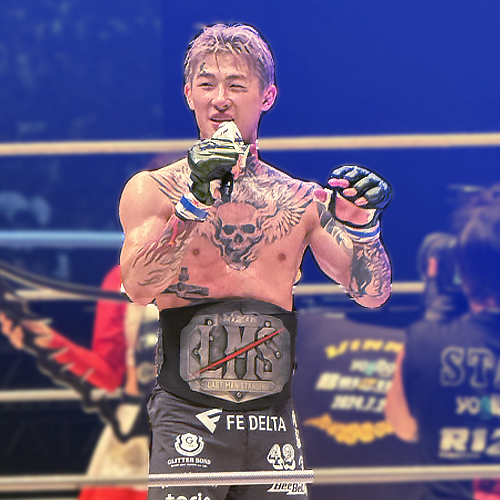
- Born: 平本蓮; June 27, 1998 (age 28); Adachi-ku, Tokyo, Japan
- Height: 5 ft 8 in (173 cm)
- Weight: 145 lb (66 kg; 10 st 5 lb)
- Division: Featherweight
- Style: Kickboxing
- Stance: Orthodox
- Fighting out of: Tokyo, Japan
- Team: K-1 Gym Team Pegasus (kickboxing); GEN Sports Palace (MMA); Roufusport (2021–present)
- Years active: 2015–present

Kickboxing record
- Total: 15
- Wins: 11
- By knockout: 6
- Losses: 4

Mixed martial arts record
- Total: 8
- Wins: 5
- By knockout: 1
- By decision: 4
- Losses: 3
- By knockout: 1
- By decision: 2

Other information
- Mixed martial arts record from Sherdog
- Last updated on: October 2, 2020

Ren Hiramoto (born 27 June 1998; Japanese: 平本蓮) is a Japanese mixed martial artist and former kickboxer, currently fighting in the featherweight division of Rizin FF. A professional competitor since 2015, he is the 2016 Krush and 2017 K-1 lightweight tournament runner-up.

== Kickboxing career ==
=== Early career ===
Hiramoto made his professional debut against Yuki Ishikawa at K-1 World GP 2015 -60kg Championship Tournament on January 18, 2015. He won the fight by a first-round left hook knockout.

Hiramoto faced Yuki Izuka at K-1 World GP 2015 -55kg Championship Tournament on April 19, 2015. He won the fight by a first-round knockout.

Hiramoto faced Yohei Noguchi at K-1 World GP 2015 -70kg Championship Tournament on July 4, 2015. He won the fight by unanimous decision, with all three judges scoring the fight 30-25 in his favor. He scored two knockdowns in the first round: the first with a right straight, while the second was a standing knockdown due to a series of undefended strikes.

Hiramoto faced the one-time Krush lightweight title challenger Minoru Kimura at K-1 World GP 2015 Survival Wars on September 22, 2015. Kimura won the fight by unanimous decision, with scores of 30-27, 30-26 and 30-27. Hiramoto was knocked down with a left hook at the very end of the second round.

After suffering his first professional loss, Hiramoto fought Massaro Glunder at K-1 World GP 2015 The Championship on November 21, 2015. Hiramoto lost the closely contested bout by majority decision, with scores of 29-29, 30-28 and 30-29.

=== Title fights ===
==== Krush lightweight tournament ====
Hiramoto participated in the 2016 Krush Lightweight tournament, held to fill the vacant title, following Hideaki Yamazaki's move up to super lightweight. Hiramoto was scheduled to face Yoshiki Harada at Krush 62 on January 17, 2016 in the tournament quarterfinals. Hiramoto won the fight by a second-round knockout. He knocked Harada down with a right straight early in the second round, and quickly followed it up with a left hook. The referee decided to wave the fight off after the second knockdown.

Hiramoto faced Taito in the tournament semifinals, held at Krush 64 on March 20, 2016. Taito advanced to the semifinals with a third-round knockout of Taro Hayasaka. Hiramoto won the fight by a dominant unanimous decision, with scores of 30-26, 30-26 and 30-25. He scored the single knockdown of the fight in the second round, dropping Taito with a left hook.

Hiramoto faced Daizo Sasaki in the tournament finals, held at Krush 66 on June 12, 2016. Sasaki earned his place in the finals with decision victories against Hisaki Higashimoto and Takayuki Minamino. Hiramoto lost the tournament final by majority decision, with scores of 29-28, 29-29 and 29-28.

==== K-1 lightweight tournament ====
Hiramoto took part in the 2017 K-1 Lightweight World Grand Prix, held on February 25, 2017. He was scheduled to face the experienced Nak Muay Brice Delval in the tournament quarterfinals. Hiramoto won the closely contested bout by majority decision, with scores of 30-28, 29-29 and 29-28. Hiramoto faced the WMPF World Super Lightweight champion Gonnapar Weerasakreck in the tournament semifinals. Hiramoto knocked Gonnapar with a right straight at the 2:15 minute mark. He knocked Gonnapar down with a left hook at the 1:44 minute mark, after which the referee stopped the fight.

Hiramoto faced the Wu Lin Feng lightweight champion Wei Rui in the tournament finals. Rui advanced to the finals with a stoppage victory against Daizo Sasaki in the quarterfinals and a decision victory against Cristian Spetcu in the semifinals. Rui won the bout by split decision, with scores of 30-28, 30-29 and 28-29.

=== Later K-1 career ===
Hiramoto was scheduled to face Umar Paskhaev at -1 World GP 2017 Super Welterweight Championship Tournament on June 18, 2017. He won the fight by unanimous decision.

Hiramoto was scheduled to fight a rematch with Daizo Sasaki at K-1 World GP 2017 Heavyweight Championship Tournament on November 23, 2017. Sasaki won their first meeting, on June 12, 2016, by majority decision. Hiramoto won the rematch through by unanimous decision, with scores of 30-25, 30-26 and 30-26. Hiramoto knocked Sasaki down twice at the very end of the round, although he was unable to finish him.

Hiramoto was scheduled to face the three-time K-1 lightweight Grand Prix winner Kaew Weerasakreck at K-1 World GP 2018: K'FESTA.1 on March 21, 2018. He won the fight by a second-round knockout. Combat Press would later name his win against Kaew as their 2018 "Upset of the Year".

Hiramoto was scheduled to face Takahiro Ashida during the Bellator and Rizin cross-promotion event, Bellator & Rizin: Japan, on December 29, 2019. He won the fight by a first-round technical knockout. Subsequently, he retired from kickboxing in order to pursue a career in professional mixed martial arts.

Hiramoto was ranked as a top ten featherweight according to Combat Press from April 2018 until July 2020, when he transitioned to mixed martial arts, and signed with Rizin.

== Mixed martial arts career ==
Hiramoto signed a contract with Rizin in June 2020, intending to compete in mixed martial arts. Hiramoto made his professional mixed martial arts debut against Kyohei Hagiwara at Rizin 26 on December 31, 2020. He lost the fight via ground and pound TKO in round 2.

Hiramoto headlined Rizin Landmark 2 against Chihiro Suzuki on March 6, 2022. He lost the bout via unanimous decision.

Hiramoto faced Hiroaki Suzuki in the co-main event of Rizin 36 on July 2, 2022. The bout was later promoted to main event status. Hiramoto won the fight by split decision.

Hiramoto faced Satoshi Yamasu in the main event of Rizin Landmark Vol.4 on November 6, 2022. He won the fight by unanimous decision.

Hiramoto faced the former Rizin FF Featherweight champion Yutaka Saito at Rizin Landmark 5 on April 29, 2023. He lost the fight by unanimous decision.

Hiramoto faced YA-MAN at Rizin 45 on December 31, 2023, winning the fight by unanimous decision.

Hiramoto faced Mikuru Asakura at Super Rizin 3 on July 28, 2024, under "Last Man Standing" rules, with a symbolic belt on the line. He won the fight by a first-round knockout.

Hiramoto is scheduled to face Karshyga Dautbek on September 10, 2026 at Super Rizin 5.

== Titles and accomplishments ==
=== Kickboxing ===
Amateur

- 2009 Windy Super Fight -40 kg Champion
- 2010 KAMINARIMON -40 kg Champion
- 2010 Windy Super Fight -45 kg Champion
- 2010 M-1 Junior -45 kg Champion
- 2011 M-1 Junior -55 kg Champion
- 2013 J-NETWORK A-League Welterweight Champion
- 2014 K-1 Koshien Champion

Professional

- K-1
  - 2017 K-1 World GP Lightweight Tournament runner-up

=== Boxing ===
- 2010 JPBA All Japan U-15 Championship winner

=== Awards ===
- 2018 Combat Press "Upset of the Year" vs. Kaew Weerasakreck
- eFight.jp Fighter of the Month (November 2022)

== Mixed martial arts record ==
Professional record breakdown
8 matches	5 wins	3 losses
By knockout	1	1
By decision	4	2

Res.	Record	Opponent	Method	Event	Date	Round	Time	Location	Notes
Win	5–3	Karshyga Dautbek	Decision (split)	Super Rizin 5	September 10, 2026	3	5:00	Osaka, Japan	
Win	4–3	Mikuru Asakura	KO (punches)	Super Rizin 3	July 28, 2024	1	2:18	Saitama, Japan	Won the symbolic Rizin "Last Man Standing" title.
Win	3–3	YA-MAN	Decision (unanimous)	Rizin 45	December 31, 2023	3	5:00	Saitama, Japan	
Loss	2–3	Yutaka Saito	Decision (split)	Rizin Landmark 5	April 29, 2023	3	5:00	Tokyo, Japan	
Win	2–2	Satoshi Yamasu	Decision (unanimous)	Rizin Landmark 4	November 6, 2022	3	5:00	Nagoya, Japan	
Win	1–2	Hiroaki Suzuki	Decision (split)	Rizin 36	July 2, 2022	3	5:00	Okinawa, Japan	
Loss	0–2	Chihiro Suzuki	Decision (unanimous)	Rizin Landmark 2	March 6, 2022	3	5:00	Fukuroi, Japan	Featherweight debut.
Loss	0–1	Kyohei Hagiwara	TKO (corner stoppage)	Rizin 26	December 31, 2020	2	1:29	Saitama, Japan	Catchweight (150 lbs) bout.

== Kickboxing record ==
Kickboxing record
11 wins (6 (T)KOs), 4 losses, 0 draws, 0 no contests
Date	Result	Opponent	Event	Location	Method	Round	Time
2019-12-29	Win	(Japan) Takahiro Ashida	Bellator & Rizin: Japan	Saitama, Japan	TKO (punches)	1	
2018-03-21	Win	(Thailand) Kaew Weerasakreck	K-1 World GP 2018: K'FESTA.1	Saitama, Japan	KO (punches)	2	2:18
2017-11-23	Win	(Japan) Daizo Sasaki	K-1 World GP 2017 Heavyweight Championship Tournament	Saitama, Japan	Decision (unanimous)	3	3:00
2017-06-18	Win	(Russia) Umar Paskhaev	K-1 World GP 2017 Super Welterweight Championship Tournament	Saitama, Japan	Decision (unanimous)	3	3:00
2017-02-25	Loss	(China) Wei Rui	K-1 World GP 2017 Lightweight Championship Tournament, Final	Tokyo, Japan	Decision (split)	3	3:00
For the inaugural K-1 Lightweight Championship and World Grand Prix title.
2017-02-25	Win	(Thailand) Kongnapa Weerasakreck	K-1 World GP 2017 Lightweight Championship Tournament, Semi Finals	Tokyo, Japan	KO (left cross)	1	1:14
2017-02-25	Win	(France) Brice Delval	K-1 World GP 2017 Lightweight Championship Tournament, Quarter Finals	Tokyo, Japan	Decision (majority)	3	3:00
2016-06-12	Loss	(Japan) Daizo Sasaki	Krush 66: -63 kg Tournament, Final	Tokyo, Japan	Decision (majority)	3	3:00
For the Krush Lightweight Title.
2016-03-20	Win	(Japan) Taito	Krush 64: -63 kg Tournament, Semi Finals	Tokyo, Japan	Decision (unanimous)	3	3:00
2016-01-17	Win	(Japan) Yoshiki Harada	Krush 62: -63 kg Tournament, Quarter Finals	Tokyo, Japan	KO (left hook)	2	1:11
2015-11-21	Loss	(Netherlands) Massaro Glunder	K-1 World GP 2015 The Championship	Tokyo, Japan	Decision (majority)	3	3:00
2015-09-22	Loss	(Brazil) Minoru Kimura	K-1 World GP 2015 Survival Wars	Tokyo, Japan	Decision (unanimous)	3	3:00
2015-07-04	Win	(Japan) Yohei Noguchi	K-1 World GP 2015 -70kg Championship Tournament	Tokyo, Japan	Decision (unanimous)	3	3:00
2015-04-19	Win	(Japan) Yuki Izuka	K-1 World GP 2015 -55kg Championship Tournament	Tokyo, Japan	TKO (referee stoppage/right hook)	1	1:40
2015-01-18	Win	(Japan) Yuki Ishikawa	K-1 World GP 2015 -60kg Championship Tournament	Tokyo, Japan	KO (left hook)	1	1:25
Legend: Win Loss Draw/no contest Notes

=== Amateur record ===
Amateur kickboxing tecord
Date	Result	Opponent	Event	Location	Method	Round	Time
2014-11-03	Win	(Japan) Tenma Sano	K-1 World GP 2014 -65kg Championship Tournament	Tokyo, Japan	Decision (unanimous)	3	3:00
Wins the 2014 K-1 Koshien Title.
2014-07-21	Win	(Japan) Yuto Shinohara	K-1 Koshien 2014 Tournament, Semi Final	Tokyo, Japan	Ext.R decision (split)	2	2:00
2014-07-21	Win	(Japan) Tatsuki Kaneda	K-1 Koshien 2014 Tournament, Quarter Final	Tokyo, Japan	Decision (unanimous)	1	2:00
2014-07-21	Win	(Japan) Kosuke Morii	K-1 Koshien 2014 Tournament, Second Round	Tokyo, Japan	Decision (unanimous)	1	2:00
2014-07-21	Win	(Japan) Taio Asahisa	K-1 Koshien 2014 Tournament, First Round	Tokyo, Japan	Decision (unanimous)	1	2:00
2013-06-23	Win	(Japan) Daichi Noto	J-Grow	Tokyo, Japan	Decision	2	2:00
2013-03-24	Win	(Japan) Moichi Tsuchiya	J-Network	Tokyo, Japan	KO		
2012-12-23	Win	(Japan) Tsubaki	Ora Ora 1	Tokyo, Japan	Decision	3	1:30
2011-09-11	Loss	(Japan) Kaito Ono	2011 M-1 Freshmans vol.3 - M-1 vs NEXT LEVEL Unification	Tokyo, Japan	Decision (majority)	3	2:00
2011-08-28	Win	(Japan) KAZUKI	M-1 Muay Thai Amateur 45	Tokyo, Japan	Decision	3	2:00
Wins the M-1 Junior -55kg Title.
2011-04-24	Loss	(Japan) Eisaku Ogasawara	REBELS.7	Tokyo, Japan	Decision	3	2:00
2011-08-28	Win	(Japan) HPS	M-1 FAIRTEX SINGHA BEER	Tokyo, Japan	Decision	3	2:00
2011-07-31	Win	(Japan) Shunsei	M-1 Muay Thai Amateur 44	Tokyo, Japan	Decision		
2010-12-12	Win	(Japan)	M-1 Amateur Muay Thai 39	Tokyo, Japan	Forfeit		
Wins the M-1 Junior -45kg Title.
2010-10-31	Win	(Japan) Ryo Kubota	M-1 Amateur Muay Thai 38	Tokyo, Japan	Decision (unanimous)	3	2:00
Wins interim the M-1 Junior -45kg Title.
2010-10-02	Win	(Japan) Tenshin Nasukawa	New ☆ square jungle	Tokyo, Japan	Decision	3	2:00
2010-09-19	Win	(Japan) Sho Yamaura	Muay Thai WINDY Super Fight vol.4	Tokyo, Japan	Decision		
Defends Windy Super Fight -45kg Title.
2010-07-18	Win	(Japan) Taisuke Ohno	A-League Tournament, Final	Tokyo, Japan	Decision	3	2:00
2010-06-13	Win	(Japan)	Muay Thai WINDY Super Fight vol.4	Tokyo, Japan	Forfeit		
Wins Windy Super Fight -45kg Title.
2010-03-14	Win	(Japan) Taisuke Ohno	Muay Thai WINDY Super Fight vol.2	Tokyo, Japan	Decision	2	2:00
Defends Windy Super Fight -40kg Title.
2010-01-24	Win	(Japan) Mizuki Ohtaka	KAMINARIMON	Tokyo, Japan	Decision	3	2:00
Wins the KAMINARIMON Junior -40kg Title.
2009-12-13	Loss	(Japan) Seira Aragaki	M-1 Muay Thai Amateur 30 - M-1 Kid's Champion Carnival '09	Tokyo, Japan	Decision		
For the M-1 Junior -40kg Title.
2009-12-06	Win	(Japan) Tatsuya Sakakibara	Muay Thai WINDY Super Fight vol.1	Tokyo, Japan	Decision (split)	2	2:00
Wins Windy Super Fight -40kg Title.
2009-10-25	Win	(Japan) Kaito Hayashi	KAMINARIMON	Tokyo, Japan	Decision (unanimous)		
Legend: Win Loss Draw/no contest Notes

== Exhibition boxing record ==
Professional record breakdown
1 match	1 win	0 losses
By knockout	1	0
By submission	0	0
By decision	0	0

Res.	Record	Opponent	Method	Event	Date	Round	Time	Location	Notes
Win	1–0	Genji Umeno	KO (left hook)	Bellator MMA vs. Rizin	31 December 2022	2	3:00	Tokyo, Japan	Special standing bout. Boxing rules with spinning back fist allowed.

== See also ==
- List of male kickboxers
- List of male mixed martial artists
