= Lee Sung-hyun =

South Korean kickboxer

- Born: January 10, 1991 (age 35); Incheon, South Korea
- Native name: 이성현
- Other names: The Korean Monster
- Height: 1.73 m (5 ft 8 in)
- Weight: 64.7 kg (143 lb; 10.19 st)
- Division: Lightweight; Welterweight; Middleweight
- Style: Kyeok Too Ki
- Stance: Orthodox
- Fighting out of: Incheon, South Korea
- Team: RAON
- Years active: 2009–present

Kickboxing record
- Total: 87
- Wins: 71
- By knockout: 18
- Losses: 14
- By knockout: 2
- Draws: 2

- Lee Sung-hyun
- Hangul: 이성현
- RR: I Seonghyeon
- MR: I Sŏnghyŏn

Lee Sung-hyun (Korean: 이성현; born January 10, 1991) is a South Korean kickboxer who competes in the lightweight, welterweight and middleweight divisions. He has held World Kickboxing Network welterweight title and RISE Middleweight champion.

Known for his speed and sophisticated combinations, Lee debuted in K-1 in March 2009 and further established himself by winning the RISE Korea Super Lightweight Championship in June 2011. He then went on compete regularly for RISE in Japan and had a breakout year in 2013 by winning the K-1 Korea MAX 2013 Tournament and the RISE lightweight title.

As of April 2013, Lee is ranked the #4 lightweight in the world by LiverKick.com.

== Career ==
=== Early career ===
Lee Sung-hyun first came to prominence by winning the KMAA Korean Welterweight Championship and debuted in K-1 on March 20, 2009, beating Kim Tae-hwan by unanimous decision at K-1 Award & MAX Korea 2009 in Seoul, South Korea. In his sophomore appearance in the promotion, he took another unanimous decision over Kizaemon Saiga at the K-1 World MAX 2010 in Seoul World Championship Tournament Final 16 on October 3, 2010. After a slow opening round, Lee began to pull ahead in the second as he dropped Saiga twice in quick succession; firstly with a seven strike combination that culminated in a liver punch and then with a left hook and right low kick combo.

=== Winning the RISE Lightweight title ===
He was then recruited by Krush to compete in the tournament to crown the promotion's inaugural 63 kg/138 lb champion. At the Krush First Generation King Tournaments ~Round.2~ in Tokyo, Japan, on January 9, 2011, he fought Koya Urabe at the quarter-final stage. The bout was scored a draw after the regulation three rounds and so an extension round was needed to decide a winner, after which Urabe was awarded the unanimous decision. Lee returned to his home country and won a four-man tournament in Seoul on June 17, 2011, beating both Son Jun-hyuk and Park Don-fa by unanimous decision to be crowned the RISE Korea Super Lightweight (-65 kg/143.3 lb) Champion. This further established him as a top prospect in the region and he was soon employed to fight on the main RISE events headquartered in Tokyo. At RISE 85 on November 23, 2011, Lee's momentum was slowed down as he lost in a non-title bout against RISE Super Lightweight Champion Koji Yoshimoto via unanimous decision. Had he not been deducted a point before the start of the fight for missing the contracted weight, he would have gotten a majority draw.

Lee bounced back with an extension round points win over Park Byung-kyu at The Khan 3: New Generation in Seoul on January 15, 2012 before taking on another reigning RISE champion, lightweight titlist Yuki, in a 64 kg/141 lb non-title affair at RISE 88 on June 2, 2012, and winning a majority decision. In the main event of RISE 89 on July 1, 2012, Lee Sung-hyun was able to beat Yuto Watanabe by technical knockout in an extension round. Although he was floored with a spinning back kick in round two, Lee controlled the rest of the bout and earned an extra round in which he dropped Watanabe twice, forcing the referee to call off the bout. He was scheduled to fight Hiroshi Mizumachi at RISE 90 on October 25, 2012, in a #1 contender's bout for a shot at Yuki's lightweight belt, but Mizumachi pulled out two weeks before with an injury and was replaced by Shohei Asahara. Lee bettered Asahara on the judges' scorecards and took a unanimous decision. At the RISE and M-1 Muaythai Challenge co-promoted event ~Infinity I~ on December 2, 2012, he knocked out Buakaw Weerasakreck with a right cross towards the end of the first round in a 63.5 kg/140 lb bout.

With this, he earned a rematch with Yuki and a shot at the RISE Lightweight (-63 kg/138.9 lb) Championship in the main event of the RISE 91/M-1 ~Infinity II~ co-promotion on January 6, 2013. The fight went very much like their first encounter, where Lee used his advantage in speed and combinations to score on Yuki, particularly with low kicks that damaged the more powerful striker and led to a stoppage in round four and captured Lee the title as well as the #4 place in the world lightweight rankings.

=== K-1 Tournaments ===
He then moved up to -70 kg/154 lb and returned to K-1 after a two-year absence to compete in the K-1 Korea MAX 2013 eight man tournament in Seoul on February 2, 2013. Drawn against Shingo Garyu in the quarter-finals, he scored a low kick knockdown over his Japanese opponent in round two before completely taking over in three. Lee dropped him again with a right cross after hurting him with a body shot and at times simply teed off on Garyu who was content to block punches with his face. Having won by unanimous decision, he then went up against Zheng Zhao Yu in the semis and won via TKO with a front kick to the body in the second round after forcing a standing eight count earlier. Pongthong Jetsada awaited him in the final, and Lee outpointed the Thai to win a unanimous decision and take the tournament crown. He remained at -70 kg/154 lb for his next outing as he made his Glory debut against Yoshihiro Sato at Glory 8: Tokyo - 2013 65kg Slam on May 3, 2013. Giving up 12 cm/4 inches in height, Lee lost to Sato by unanimous decision in a close match. Lee dropped to 65 kg/143 lb to fight RISE's super lightweight title holder Yasuomi Soda in a non-championship bout at RISE 94 on July 19, 2013. Soda was shown a yellow card after low blowing Lee twice in round one but stormed back to win a majority decision and stop Lee's five-fight winning streak in the promotion. Having qualified for the tournament with his K-1 Korea win, Lee beat Charles François by unanimous decision after scoring a first round knockdown at the K-1 World MAX 2013 World Championship Tournament Final 16 in Majorca, Spain on September 14, 2013.

He took a split decision over Elam Ngor at the K-1 World MAX World Championship Tournament Quarter-final in Gran Canaria in Gran Canaria, Spain on January 11, 2014, in a close, technical affair where Ngor landed a few low blows. At the K-1 World MAX 2014 World Championship Tournament Final 4 in Baku, Azerbaijan on February 23, 2014, he lost to Buakaw Banchamek by UD in the semi-finals.

He is expected to face Hiroaki Suzuki at -65 kg/143 lb at Shootboxing 2014: Act 3 in Tokyo on June 21, 2014. He won the fight by decision. Lee defended his RISE lightweight title against Shohei Asahara on April 29, 2014, at RISE 99. He won the fight by majority decision. Lee was initially set to fight Andrei Kulebin at the K-1 World MAX 2013 World Championship Tournament Final in Pattaya, Thailand on July 26, 2014. The event was postponed due to the 2014 Thai coup d'état, however. He fought Kulebin in October 2014, and won by an extra round decision.

=== RISE Middleweight champion ===
Lee participated in the Kunlun Fight Qualification tournament, at KLF 40. He defeated Zhang Chunyu by a third-round TKO in the semifinals, and Chris Ngimbi by decision in the finals.

In July 2019, Lee faced Shintaro Matsukura at RISE 133 on July 5, 2019, for the vacant RISE Middleweight Championship. He won the fight by decision.

Lee was scheduled to face Johnny Smith for the WKN World welterweight title at Prokick: Knockdown Lockdown on November 27, 2021. He won the fight by split decision.

Lee faced Tsukuru Midorikawa in a non-title bout at RISE 161 on August 28, 2022. The fight was ruled a majority decision draw after the first three rounds, with two judges scoring it as an even 29–29 and 30–30 draw, while the third judge had it scored 30–29 for Midorikawa. The fight was once again ruled a majority draw, after an extra fourth round was contested.

Lee made his first RISE Middleweight title defense against the #1 ranked contender Kaito Ono at RISE EL DORADO 2023 on March 26, 2023. He lost the fight by unanimous decision, with scores of 50–47, 50–48 and 50–48.

Lee faced the RISE welterweight champion Ryota Nakano in a non-title bout at RISE World Series 2023 - 1st Round on July 2, 2023. He lost the fight by a second-round spinning backfist knockout.

=== Super lightweight ===
Lee faced former RISE Lightweight champion Taiju Shiratori at RISE ELDORADO 2024 on March 17, 2024. He won the fight by majority decision.

Lee faced Ryota Nakano in a re-match at RISE WORLD SERIES 2024 YOKOHAMA on September 8, 2024. He won the fight by majority decision, with scores of 30–29, 30–29 and 29–29.

Lee faced Berjan Peposhi in the quarterfinals of the GLORY RISE Featherweight Grand Prix, held on December 21, 2024, in Chiba, Japan. He won the fight by majority decision. In the semifinals of the one-day tournament, Lee faced the Petpanomrung Kiatmuu9. He lost the fight by unanimous decision, with all three judges awarding Petpanomrung all three rounds of the bout.

Lee faced the former RISE Lightweight (-63 kg) champion Kento Haraguchi at RISE ELDORADO 2025 on March 29, 2025. He lost the fight by unanimous decision, with all three judges scoring the bout 30—27 in Haraguchi's favor.

== Championships and awards ==
=== Kickboxing ===
- Kunlun Fight
  - 2016 Kunlun Fight World Max Group F Tournament Winner
- K-1
  - K-1 Korea MAX 2013 Tournament Championship
- Korean Martial Arts Association
  - KMAA Korean Welterweight Championship
- RISE
  - 2011 RISE Korea Super Lightweight (-65 kg/143.3 lb) Champion
  - 2013 RISE Lightweight (-63 kg/138.9 lb) Champions (one defense)
  - 2019 RISE Middleweight (-70 kg) Champion
- World Kickboxing Network
  - 2021 WKN Oriental rules World Welterweight (-69.8 kg/154 lbs) Championship

== Kickboxing record ==
Kickboxing record
71 Wins (18 KOs), 14 Losses 2 Draws
Date	Result	Opponent	Event	Location	Method	Round	Time
2026-03-28	Loss	(Japan) YURA	RISE ELDORADO 2026 - Last Featherweight Standing Quarterfinals	Tokyo, Japan	TKO (Punches)	3	2:55
2025-11-02	Win	(Japan) Yutaro Asahi	RISE World Series 2025 Final - Last Featherweight Standing Second Round	Tokyo, Japan	Decision (Majority)	3	3:00
2025-03-29	Loss	(Japan) Kento Haraguchi	RISE ELDORADO 2025	Tokyo, Japan	Decision (Unanimous)	3	3:00
2024-12-21	Loss	(Thailand) Petpanomrung Kiatmuu9	GLORY RISE Featherweight Grand Prix, Semifinals	Chiba, Japan	Decision (Unanimous)	3	3:00
2024-12-21	Win	(Albania) Berjan Peposhi	GLORY RISE Featherweight Grand Prix, Quarterfinals	Chiba, Japan	Decision (Majority)	3	3:00
2024-09-08	Win	(Japan) Ryota Nakano	RISE WORLD SERIES 2024 YOKOHAMA	Yokohama, Japan	Decision (Majority)	3	3:00
2024-03-17	Win	(Japan) Taiju Shiratori	RISE ELDORADO 2024	Tokyo, Japan	Decision (Majority)	3	3:00
2023-07-02	Loss	(Japan) Ryota Nakano	RISE World Series 2023 – 1st Round	Osaka, Japan	KO (Spinning back fist)	2	1:05
2023-04-29	Win	(Brazil) Tom Santos	KTK Championship	Daegu, South Korea	TKO (Jumping knee)	2	
2023-03-26	Loss	(Japan) Kaito Ono	RISE ELDORADO 2023	Tokyo, Japan	Decision (Unanimous)	5	3:00
Loses the RISE Middleweight title.
2022-08-28	Draw	(Japan) Tsukuru Midorikawa	RISE 161	Tokyo, Japan	Ext.R Decision (Majority)	4	3:00
2021-11-27	Win	(United Kingdom) Johnny Smith	Prokick: Knockdown Lockdown	Belfast, Northern Ireland	Decision (Split)	5	3:00
Wins the WKN Oriental rules World Welterweight title.
2019-09-28	Loss	(Japan) Kaito	Shoot Boxing 2019 act.4	Tokyo, Japan	Decision (Unanimous)	5	3:00
2019-07-05	Win	(Japan) Shintaro Matsukura	RISE 133	Japan	Decision (Unanimous)	5	3:00
Wins the vacant RISE Middleweight title.
2018-06-17	Win	(Japan) Shintaro Matsukura	RISE 125	Chiba, Japan	Ext.R Decision (Unanimous)	4	3:00
2018-05-12	Win	(Russia) Vladimir Shuliak	KTK in Kimpo	South Korea	Decision	3	3:00
2017-05-14	Win	(Mongolia) Sundui Batjargal	ICX Seoul	South Korea	KO (Right Low Kick)	2	
2016-08-20	Loss	(Thailand) Jomthong Chuwattana	Kunlun Fight 50 – World MAX 2016 Final 16	Jinan, China	Decision (unanimous)	3	3:00
2016-03-25	Win	(Democratic Republic of the Congo) Chris Ngimbi	Kunlun Fight 40 – World MAX 2016 Group F Tournament Final	Tongling, China	Decision (unanimous)	3	3:00
Qualified to Kunlun Fight 2016 70kg World MAX Tournament Final 16.
2016-03-25	Win	(China) Zhang Chunyu	Kunlun Fight 40 – World MAX 2016 Group F Tournament Semi Finals	Tongling, China	TKO	3	
2016-01-23	Win	(China) Jiao Daobo	Kunlun Fight 37	China	Decision (unanimous)	3	3:00
2016-01-09	Win	(China) Gu Hui	Kunlun Fight 36	Shanghai, China	Decision (unanimous)	3	3:00
2015-11-14	Win	(Nepal) Mohan Dragon	MKF Ultimate Victor 2015	Incheon, South Korea	Decision (unanimous)	3	3:00
2014-10-11	Win	(Belarus) Andrei Kulebin	K-1 World MAX 2014 World Championship Tournament Final	Pattaya, Thailand	Ext.R decision	4	3:00
2014-06-21	Win	(Japan) Hiroaki Suzuki	Shootboxing 2014: Act 3	Tokyo, Japan	Decision (unanimous)	5	3:00
2014-04-29	Win	(Japan) Shohei Asahara	RISE 99	Tokyo, Japan	Decision (majority)	5	3:00
Defends the RISE Lightweight (-63 kg/138.9 lb) Championship.
2014-03-31	Win	(China) Meng Guodong	Kunlun Fight 3	Harbin, China	KO	2	2:00
2014-02-23	Loss	(Thailand) Buakaw Banchamek	K-1 World MAX 2013 Tournament Final 4, Semi Finals	Baku, Azerbaijan	Decision (unanimous)	3	3:00
2014-01-11	Win	(Senegal) Elam Ngor	K-1 World MAX World Championship Tournament Quarter-final	Gran Canaria, Spain	Decision (split)	3	3:00
2013-09-14	Win	(France) Charles François	K-1 World MAX 2013 World Championship Tournament Final 16	Majorca, Spain	Decision (unanimous)	3	3:00
2013-07-19	Loss	(Japan) Yasuomi Soda	RISE 94	Tokyo, Japan	Decision (majority)	3	3:00
2013-05-03	Loss	(Japan) Yoshihiro Sato	Glory 8: Tokyo	Tokyo, Japan	Decision (unanimous)	3	3:00
2013-02-02	Win	(Thailand) Pongthong Jetsada	K-1 Korea MAX 2013, Final	Seoul, South Korea	Decision (unanimous)	3	3:00
Wins the K-1 Korea MAX 2013 Tournament Championship.
2013-02-02	Win	(China) Zheng Zhaoyu	K-1 Korea MAX 2013, Semi Finals	Seoul, South Korea	TKO (front kick to the body)	2	2:04
2013-02-02	Win	(Japan) Shingo Garyu	K-1 Korea MAX 2013, Quarter Finals	Seoul, South Korea	Decision (unanimous)	3	3:00
2013-01-06	Win	(Japan) Yuki	RISE 91/M-1 ~Infinity II~	Tokyo, Japan	KO (low kicks)	4	1:58
Wins the RISE Lightweight (-63 kg/138.9 lb) Championship.
2012-12-02	Win	(Thailand) Buakaw Weerasakreck	RISE/M-1 ~Infinity I~	Tokyo, Japan	KO (right cross)	1	2:58
2012-10-25	Win	(Japan) Shohei Asahara	RISE 90	Tokyo, Japan	Decision (unanimous)	3	3:00
2012-07-01	Win	(Japan) Yuto Watanabe	RISE 89	Tokyo, Japan	TKO (right cross)	4	1:29
2012-06-02	Win	(Japan) Yuki	RISE 88	Tokyo, Japan	Decision (majority)	3	3:00
2012-01-15	Win	(South Korea) Park Byung-kyu	The Khan 3: New Generation	Seoul, South Korea	Ext.R decision (unanimous)	4	3:00
2011-11-23	Loss	(Japan) Koji Yoshimoto	RISE 85	Tokyo, Japan	Decision (unanimous)	3	3:00
2011-06-17	Win	(South Korea) Park Don-fa	RISE Korea, Final	Seoul, South Korea	Decision (unanimous)	3	3:00
Wins the RISE Korea Super Lightweight (-65 kg/143.3 lb) Championship.
2011-06-17	Win	(South Korea) Son Jun-hyuk	RISE Korea, Semi Finals	Seoul, South Korea	KO (low kicks)	2	1:50
2011-01-09	Loss	(Japan) Koya Urabe	Krush First Generation King Tournaments ~Round.2~, Quarter Finals	Tokyo, Japan	Ext.R decision (unanimous)	4	3:00
2010-10-03	Win	(Japan) Kizaemon Saiga	K-1 World MAX 2010 in Seoul World Championship Tournament Final 16	Seoul, South Korea	Decision (unanimous)	3	3:00
2010-00-00	Win	(South Korea) Kwon Min-seok	RISE Korea	Seoul, South Korea	Decision	3	3:00
2009-03-20	Win	(South Korea) Kim Tae-hwan	K-1 Award & MAX Korea 2009	Seoul, South Korea	Decision (unanimous)	3	3:00
Legend: Win Loss Draw/No contest Notes
