= Ilias Bulaid =

Dutch kickboxer and mixed martial arts fighter

- Born: 1 May 1995 (age 31); Den Bosch, Netherlands
- Nickname: The Blade
- Nationality: Dutch; Moroccan
- Height: 1.78 m (5 ft 10 in)
- Weight: 65.0 kg (143.3 lb; 10.24 st)
- Division: Featherweight (Kickboxing); Featherweight (MMA)
- Style: Kickboxing
- Stance: Orthodox
- Fighting out of: Rotterdam
- Team: Fight Club Den Bosch (formerly); El Otmani Gym (formerly); SB Gym (formerly); Fighting Talents; Van Buel Sports
- Trainer: William van Roosmalen (formerly); William Beekwilder (formerly); Said el Badaoui (formerly); Suli Abdeselam Mohamed (wrestling, formerly); Hans Kroon (strength and conditioning); Ossama El Gaoui (kickboxing); Duane van Helvoirt (MMA/grappling)
- Years active: 2013–present

Kickboxing record
- Total: 31
- Wins: 25
- By knockout: 10
- Losses: 6
- By knockout: 1

Mixed martial arts record
- Total: 11
- Wins: 9
- By knockout: 5
- By submission: 1
- By decision: 3
- Losses: 1
- By decision: 1
- No contests: 1

Other information
- Website: https://www.iliasbulaid.com/
- Mixed martial arts record from Sherdog
- Last updated on: September 24, 2020

Ilias Bulaid (born May 1, 1995) is a Moroccan-Dutch kickboxer and mixed martial artist. Ilias was the 2016 K-1 World Super Lightweight Tournament runner-up, and is the former Enfusion 67 kg World Champion.

He was first ranked as a top ten Featherweight by Combat Press in January 2016, and was last ranked in the top ten in August 2019, before being dropped from the rankings in September 2019.

== Youth and beginnings ==
Ilias Bulaid was born and raised in Den Bosch. At the age of five, his older sister enrolled him in a kickboxing gym in Den Bosch. At eleven, his father died. In Den Bosch, he trained at Fight Club Den Bosch under the tutelage of William van Roosmalen and William Beekwilder. He later left Fight Club Den Bosch and join SB Gym to train under the supervision of Said el Badaoui.

== Kickboxing career ==
=== Enfusion ===
==== Early career ====
Bulaid made his professional debut against Angelo Campoli at The Night of Kick and Punch 4°edizione on November 30, 2014. He won the fight by decision. Bulaid won his next fight fights as well, one by stoppage, before facing Piotr Kobylański at KOK in Gdańsk on October 17, 2014. He won this KOK debut by unanimous decision. Bulaid made his K-1 debut against Taito in the reserve match of the K-1 World GP 2014 -65kg Championship Tournament on November 3, 2014. He won the fight by a third-round technical knockout.

==== Enfusion champion ====
Bulaid amassed an 8–0 record in the first year of his professional career, which earned him the right to face Zaid Zairov for the vacant Enfusion 67 kg title at Enfusion Live 23 on December 20, 2014. He won the fight by a second-round knockout, stopping Zairov with a step-in knee.

Bulaid faced the reigning Krush welterweight champion Masaaki Noiri in a non-title bout at Krush 51 on February 6, 2015. Noiri handed Bulaid his first professional loss, as he won the fight by unanimous decision, with all three judges scoring the fight 30–27 in his favor.

After beating Maxim Federkov by a third-round knockout at Enfusion Live 29 on May 24, 2015, Bulaid was booked to make his first Enfusion title defense. He faced Simón Santana in the main event of Enfusion Live 30 on July 11, 2015. Bulaid won the fight by a first-round knockout, needing just 67 seconds to stop Santana.

Bulaid faced the two-sport ISKA welterweight champion David Mejia in a non-title bout at Enfusion Live 32 on October 10, 2015. He won the fight by decision.

Bulaid made his second Enfusion title defense against Edye Ruiz at Enfusion Live 34 on November 21, 2015. He won the fight by unanimous decision.

Bulaid faced Edson Fortes in a non-title bout at Enfusion Live #37 on February 27, 2016. He won the fight by decision.

=== K-1 and WLF ===
==== K-1 Super Lightweight Grand Prix ====
Bulaid faced the reigning K-1 super lightweight champion and the 2014 K-1 World GP World Tournament Champion Kaew Fairtex at K-1 World GP 2016 -60kg Japan Tournament on April 24, 2016. He lost the fight by unanimous decision. Despite this loss, Buliad took part in the K-1 World GP 2016 -65kg World Tournament, which took place on June 24, 2016.

Bulaid was booked to face Chris Mauceri in the tournament quarterfinals. He made quick work of his opponent, knocking him down twice fifty seconds into the second round, which resulted in a technical knockout victory for him under the K-1 tournament rules. Bulaid advanced to the semifinals, where he faced the former Krush lightweight and super lightweight champion Hideaki Yamazaki. He won the fight by split decision, after an extra fourth round was fought. Bulaid faced Kaew Fairtex in the tournament finals, to whom he had lost just two months prior. Bulaid lost the rematch by a second-round technical knockout.

==== Kunlun Fight ====
Bulaid faced the 2016 WLF World 8 Man Tournament champion Qiu Jianliang at Glory of Heroes 5 on October 1, 2016. He lost the fight by unanimous decision.

Bulaid made his third Enfusion title defense against Zakaria Zouggary at Enfusion Live 46 on February 18, 2017. He won the fight by decision. Bulaid's next fight took place in Netherlands as well, as he was booked to face Manaowan Sitsongpeenong at Fight League 6 on May 13, 2017. He won the fight by a first-round knockout.

Bulaid participated in the 2017 Kunlun Fight 67 kg tournament, and faced Jordan Kranio in the first round of the tournament, at Kunlun Fight 65 - Kunlun Fight 16 Man Tournament on August 27, 2017. He won the fight by a first-round knockout and advanced to the quarterfinals where he faced Petchtanong Banchamek. Despite winning the fight by unanimous decision, Bulaid was forced to withdraw from the tournament due to injury.

==== Wu Lin Feng ====
Bulaid took part in the Wu Lin Feng 2018 World Championship in Tianjin, which took place on March 3, 2018. He faced Xie Lei in the quarterfinals of the one-day tournament. Bulaid won the fight by unanimous decision, and faced countryman Hasan Toy in the semifinals. Toy won the fight by split decision.

Bulaid faced Wei Ninghui at Wu Lin Feng 2019: WLF -67kg World Cup 2019-2020 1st Group Stage on June 29, 2019. He won the fight by a third-round knockout. Bulaid next faced Jia Aoqi at Wu Lin Feng 2019: WLF -67kg World Cup 2019-2020 3rd Group Stage on August 31, 2019. He lost the fight by unanimous decision, after an extra round was fought.

== Mixed martial arts career ==
=== Bellator MMA ===
Bulaid signed his first MMA contract with Bellator MMA, and made his professional debut in September 2019, during Bellator 227 against Vitalic Maiboroda. Bulaid won the fight by a first-round KO.

Bulaid made his second appearance with Bellator at Bellator 240 on February 22, 2020, when he faced Diego Freitas. Bulaid won the fight by unanimous decision.

Bulaid faced Georges Sasu at Bellator 270 on November 5, 2021. He won the bout via split decision.

Bulaid was scheduled to face Weber Almeida at Bellator 284 on August 12, 2022. In July, the bout was scrapped for unknown reasons.

=== Post-Bellator ===
On May 19, 2023, Bulaid made his first appearance outside of Bellator at UAE Warriors 41, defeating Omar Khaled Fayoumi via TKO stoppage due to knees in the first round. Ten months later, he faced Saba Sozashvili in Tenerife, Spain and beat him by unanimous decision. In his next two fights, also in Tenerife, Bulaid beat Anthony Riggio by TKO due to leg kicks in the first round, and won another fight by TKO after his opponent Kewin Jacques Rangell retired 52 seconds into the third round.

== Titles and accomplishments ==
- Enfusion
  - 2014 Enfusion World 67 kg Championship
    - Three successful title defenses
- K-1
  - 2016 K-1 Super Lightweight (-65 kg) World Grand Prix runner-up

== Mixed martial arts record ==
Professional record breakdown
11 matches	9 wins	1 loss
By knockout	5	0
By submission	1	0
By decision	3	1
No contests	1	

Res.	Record	Opponent	Method	Event	Date	Round	Time	Location	Notes
Loss	9–1 (1)	Erick Visconde	Decision (unanimous)	Dana White's Contender Series 96	September 29, 2026	3	5:00	Las Vegas, Nevada, United States	
Win	9–0 (1)	Wellyton da Silva	TKO (knee to the body and punches)	Levels Fight League 22	April 11, 2026	1	3:08	Antwerp, Belgium	Won the interim LFL Featherweight Championship.
Win	8–0 (1)	Eduard Demenko	Technical submission (anaconda choke)	UAE Warriors 61	July 23, 2025	1	3:07	Abu Dhabi, United Arab Emirates	Catchweight (150 lb) bout.
NC	7–0 (1)	Rebin Fazil	NC (punches to back of head)	UAE Warriors 59	June 12, 2025	1	0:42	Abu Dhabi, United Arab Emirates	Accidental punches to back of head rendered Fazil unable to continue.
Win	7–0	Kewin Jacques Rangell	TKO (retirement)	Fight2One 8	February 8, 2025	3	0:52	Tenerife, Spain	
Win	6–0	Anthony Riggio	TKO (leg kick)	Brave CF 89	October 19, 2024	1	4:01	Tenerife, Spain	
Win	5–0	Saba Sozashvili	Decision (unanimous)	Fight2One 5	March 17, 2024	3	5:00	Tenerife, Spain	
Win	4–0	Omar Khaled Fayoumi	TKO (knees)	UAE Warriors 41	May 19, 2023	1	3:28	Abu Dhabi, United Arab Emirates	
Win	3–0	Georges Sasu	Decision (split)	Bellator 270	November 5, 2021	3	5:00	Dublin, Ireland	
Win	2–0	Diego Freitas	Decision (unanimous)	Bellator 240	February 22, 2020	3	5:00	Dublin, Ireland	
Win	1–0	Vitalic Maiboroda	KO (knee)	Bellator 227	September 27, 2019	1	4:59	Dublin, Ireland	Featherweight debut.

== Professional kickboxing record ==
Professional kickboxing record
25 wins (10 (T)KOs), 6 losses
Date	Result	Opponent	Event	Location	Method	Round	Time	Record
2019-08-31	Loss	(China) Jia Aoqi	Wu Lin Feng 2019: WLF -67kg World Cup 2019-2020 3rd Group Stage	Zhengzhou, China	Ext.R decision (unanimous)	4	3:00	25–6
2019-06-29	Win	(China) Wei Ninghui	Wu Lin Feng 2019: WLF -67kg World Cup 2019-2020 1st Group Stage	Zhengzhou, China	KO (straight to the body)	3	1:11	25–5
2018-09-15	Win	(Belgium) Youssef El Haji	Enfusion Live 70	Belgium	Decision (unanimous)	3	3:00	24–5
2018-03-03	Loss	(Netherlands) Hasan Toy	Wu Lin Feng 2018: World Championship Tianjin -67 kg Contender Tournament Final	Tianjin, China	Decision (split)	3	3:00	23–5
2018-03-03	Win	(China) Xie Lei	Wu Lin Feng 2018: World Championship Tianjin -67 kg Contender Tournament Semi Final	Tianjin, China	Decision (unanimous)	3	3:00	23–4
2017-11-12	Win	(Thailand) Petchtanong Banchamek	Kunlun Fight 67 - 66kg World Championship, Quarter Finals	Sanya, China	Decision (unanimous)	3	3:00	22–4
Had to withdraw from tournament due to injury.
2017-08-27	Win	(Brazil) Jordan Kranio	Kunlun Fight 65 - Kunlun Fight 16 Man Tournament 67 kg- Final 16	Qingdao, China	KO (left hook to the body)	1	2:25	21–4
2017-05-13	Win	(Thailand) Manaowan Sitsongpeenong	Fight League 6	Hoofddorp, Netherlands	KO (spinning back kick to the body)	1	1:30	20–4
2017-02-18	Win	(Morocco) Zakaria Zouggary	Enfusion Live 46	Eindhoven, Netherlands	Decision	5	3:00	19–4
Defends the Enfusion -67 kg Championship.
2016-12-03	Win	(China) Xie Lei	Wu Lin Feng 2016: WLF x Krush - China vs Japan	Zhengzhou, China	Decision (unanimous)	3	3:00	18–4
2016-10-01	Loss	(China) Qiu Jianliang	Glory of Heroes 5	Zhengzhou, China	Decision (unanimous)	3	3:00	17–4
2016-08-01	Win	(China) Wang Fangkun	SAK	Japan	KO (left body knee)	2	2:06	17–3
2016-06-24	Loss	(Thailand) Kaew Fairtex	K-1 World GP 2016 -65kg World Tournament, Final	Tokyo, Japan	TKO (knee to the body)	2	2:26	16–3
Fight was for K-1 World GP 2016 -65kg World Tournament Belt.
2016-06-24	Win	(Japan) Hideaki Yamazaki	K-1 World GP 2016 -65kg World Tournament, Semi Finals	Tokyo, Japan	Extra round decision (split)	4	3:00	16–2
2016-06-24	Win	(United States) Chris Mauceri	K-1 World GP 2016 -65kg World Tournament, Quarter Finals	Tokyo, Japan	KO (left body hook)	2	0:50	15–2
2016-04-24	Loss	(Thailand) Kaew Fairtex	K-1 World GP 2016 -60kg Japan Tournament	Tokyo, Japan	Decision (unanimous)	3	3:00	14–2
2016-02-27	Win	(Cape Verde) Edson Fortes	Enfusion Live #37	Eindhoven, Netherlands	Decision	3	3:00	14–1
2015-11-21	Win	(Spain) Edye Ruiz	Enfusion Live 34	Groningen, Netherlands	Decision (unanimous)	5	3:00	13–1
Defends the Enfusion -67 kg Championship.
2015-10-10	Win	(Spain) David Mejia	Enfusion Live 32	Belgium	Decision	3	3:00	12–1
2015-07-11	Win	(Spain) Simón Santana	Enfusion Live 30	Dublin, Ireland	KO (left high knee)	1	1:07	11–1
Defends the Enfusion -67 kg Championship.
2015-05-24	Win	(Germany) Maxim Federkov	Enfusion Live 29	Netherlands	TKO (left hook to the body)	3	0:20	10–1
2015-02-06	Loss	(Japan) Masaaki Noiri	Krush 51	Tokyo, Japan	Decision (unanimous)	3	3:00	9–1
2014-12-20	Win	(Uzbekistan) Zaid Zairov	Enfusion Live 23	Antwerp, Belgium	KO (left high knee)	2	1:18	9–0
Wins the vacant Enfusion -67 kg Championship.
2014-11-03	Win	(Japan) Taito	K-1 World GP 2014 -65kg Championship Tournament, Reserve Fight	Tokyo, Japan	TKO (left high knee)	3	2:30	8–0
2014-10-17	Win	(Poland) Piotr Kobylański	KOK in Gdańsk	Poland	Decision (unanimous)	3	3:00	7–0
2014-10-04	Win	(Germany) Mark Vogel	Enfusion Live 21	Germany	Decision	3	3:00	6–0
2014-06-29	Win	(England) Regis Sugden	Enfusion Live 19	England	Decision (unanimous)	3	3:00	5–0
2014-03-23	Win	(Republic of Ireland) Paul Norton	Enfusion Live	Ireland	TKO (3 knockdowns)	1	2:59	4–0
2014-02-22	Win	(Morocco) Reda Aoulad Ben Said	Enfusion Live 14	Netherlands	Decision (unanimous)	3	3:00	3–0
2014-01-25	Win	(Netherlands) Jackie Dings	Enfusion Live	Netherlands	Decision (unanimous)	5	3:00	2–0
2013-11-30	Win	(Italy) Angelo Campoli	The Night of Kick and Punch 4°edizione	Italy	Decision	3	3:00	1–0
Legend: Win Loss Draw/no contest Notes

== See also ==
- List of male kickboxers
- List of male mixed martial artists
