= Yasuomi Soda =

Japanese kickboxer and boxer

- Born: 左右田泰臣; June 8, 1988 (age 38); Tokyo, Japan
- Height: 177 cm (5 ft 10 in)
- Weight: 65.0 kg (143.3 lb; 10.24 st)
- Style: Kickboxing
- Stance: Orthodox
- Fighting out of: Tokyo, Japan
- Team: Silver Wolf (Kickboxing)
- Years active: 2009 - present

Professional boxing record
- Total: 13
- Wins: 10
- By knockout: 5
- Losses: 2
- Draws: 1

Kickboxing record
- Total: 35
- Wins: 26
- By knockout: 9
- Losses: 9
- By knockout: 1

Other information
- Boxing record from BoxRec

Yasuomi Soda (左右田 泰臣, Sōda Yasuomi) is a Japanese kickboxer and boxer. In kickboxing he was the RISE kickboxing Super Lightweight champion and the K-1 World GP 2014 -65kg Championship Tournament finalist. and holds victories over notable featherweight kickboxers such as Minoru Kimura and Yuta Kubo. In boxing he is the reigning Japan Super welterweight champion.

== Kickboxing career ==
=== RISE Super Lightweight title run ===
Soda made his debut in 2009, when he participated in the RISE 59 RISING ROOKIES CUP. He won the tournament with victories over Ryuji Yamaguchi, Ishitsukasa Koichi and Atsushi Hori.

Soda then went on to win his next eight fights, winning three of them by stoppage. His eleven fight winning streak earned him the chance to challenge Koji Yoshimoto for the RISE Super Lightweight title. He suffered the first professional loss of his career, as Yoshimoto won the fight by unanimous decision.

Soda bounced back with a TKO of Kim Dong-soo and a decision win over Komiya Yukihiro, which gave the chance the fight a rematch with Koji Yoshimoto. Soda won the fight, and title, by majority decision.

=== K-1 Super Lightweight tournament ===
In his next fight, Soda fought Lee Sung-hyun and won by majority decision.

After winning his next two fights, Soda participated in the 2014 K-1 Super Lightweight Grand Prix. In the quarterfinals, he scored a second round TKO over Minoru Kimura. In the semifinals, he won a decision against Hiroya. In the finals, he fought Kaew Fairtex, and lost a majority decision.

=== Krush title fights ===
Following this loss, Soda went on a 3-3 run, which included a win over Yuta Kubo and a second loss to Kaew Fairtex. In August 2017, during Krush 78, Soda fought Jun Nakazawa for the Krush Super Lightweight title. The fight went into an extra round, after which Nakazawa won a split decision.

Soda participated in the 2018 K-1 Super Lightweight Grand Prix. He defeated Mo Abdurahman by a fourth round KO, but lost to Kaew Fairtex by an extra round decision in the semifinals.

During Krush 104, Soda once again fought for the Krush Super Lightweight title, this time against Hayato Suzuki. The fight went into an extra round, after which Suzuki won a unanimous decision.

== Titles and accomplishments ==
- K-1
  - 2016 K-1 World GP 2014 -65kg Championship Tournament runner-up
- RISE
  - 2013 RISE 65 kg Champion
  - 2009 RISE ROOKIES CUP 65 kg champion

== Professional boxing record ==
12 fights	9 wins	2 losses
By knockout	5	0
By decision	4	2
Draws	1	

No.	Result	Record	Opponent	Type	Round, time	Date	Location	Notes
13	Win	10-2-1	Junpei Tsujimoto	UD	10	15 Jul 2026	Korakuen Hall, Tokyo, Japan	Retained the Japanese Super Welterweight title
12	Win	9-2-1	Ran Kamikaze	UD	10	10 Mar 2026	Korakuen Hall, Tokyo, Japan	Won the Japanese Super Welterweight title
11	Loss	8-2-1	Nath Nwachukwu	UD	12	31 Jul 2025	Korakuen Hall, Tokyo, Japan	For the vacant OPBF Super-welterweight title
10	Win	8-1-1	Hisashi Kato	KO	7 (8)	27 Apr 2025	Kumagaya Dome, Kumagaya, Japan	
9	Loss	7-1-1	Ryota Toyoshima	UD	8	21 Nov 2024	Korakuen Hall, Tokyo, Japan	
8	Win	7-0-1	Ma Roo Jung	UD	6	27 Jun 2024	Korakuen Hall, Tokyo, Japan	
7	Win	6–0–1	Yong In Jo	TKO	8 (8), 2:16	12 Mar 2024	Korakuen Hall, Tokyo, Japan	
6	Win	5–0–1	Taiga Ito	KO	3 (8), 2:08	24 Aug 2023	Korakuen Hall, Tokyo, Japan	
5	Win	4–0–1	Chan Sala	UD	6	31 May 2023	Korakuen Hall, Tokyo, Japan	
4	Win	3–0–1	Mitsuyoshi Oshima	TKO	6 (6), 0:44	29 Mar 2023	Korakuen Hall, Tokyo, Japan	
3	Draw	2–0–1	Tatsuki Tokiyoshi	MD	4	3 Nov 2022	Korakuen Hall, Tokyo, Japan	
2	Win	2–0	Eigoro Akai	SD	4	27 Sep 2022	Korakuen Hall, Tokyo, Japan	
1	Win	1–0	Anju The Bull	TKO	2 (4), 1:56	10 Jun 2022	Korakuen Hall, Tokyo, Japan	

== Kickboxing record ==
Kickboxing record
26 Wins, 9 Losses, 0 Draw
Date	Result	Opponent	Event	Location	Method	Round	Time
2019-08-31	Loss	(Japan) Hayato Suzuki	Krush 104	Tokyo, Japan	Ext.R Decision (Unanimous)	4	3:00
For the Krush -65kg Belt.
2019-03-10	Win	(Japan) Masaya Matsuhana	K-1 World GP 2019: K’FESTA 2	Saitama, Japan	Decision (Unanimous)	3	3:00
2018-11-03	Loss	(Thailand) Kaew Weerasakreck	K-1 World GP 2018: Super Lightweight Championship Tournament, Semi Finals	Saitama, Japan	Ext. R. Decision (Unanimous)	4	3:00
2018-11-03	Win	(South Africa) Mo Abdurahman	K-1 World GP 2018: Super Lightweight Championship Tournament, Quarter Finals	Saitama, Japan	KO (Right knee to the body)	4	2:30
2018-07-22	Win	(China) Meng Guodong	Krush.90	Tokyo, Japan	KO (Left hook to the body)	2	2:54
2018-03-21	Loss	(Japan) Jun Nakazawa	K-1 World GP 2018: K'FESTA.1	Saitama, Japan	Decision (Majority)	3	3:00
2017-12-09	Win	(Japan) Hiroki Nakamura	Krush.83	Tokyo, Japan	Decision (Unanimous)	3	3:00
2017-08-06	Loss	(Japan) Jun Nakazawa	Krush.78	Tokyo, Japan	Extra Round Decision (Split)	4	3:00
For the Krush -65kg Belt.
2017-04-02	Win	(Japan) Daiki Matsushita	Krush.75	Tokyo, Japan	KO (Right Cross)	1	2:18
2016-11-02	Win	(Netherlands) Fawad Seddiqi	K-1 World GP in Japan Featherweight Championship Tournament	Tokyo, Japan	Decision (unanimous)	3	3:00
2016-03-04	Loss	(Japan) Hideaki Yamazaki	K-1 World GP 2016 -65kg Japan Tournament, Quarter Finals	Tokyo, Japan	KO (Uppercut + Left Hook)	2	0:32
2015-11-21	Loss	(Japan) Masaaki Noiri	K-1 World GP 2015 The Championship	Tokyo, Japan	Decision (unanimous)	3	3:00
2015-07-04	Loss	(Thailand) Kaew Fairtex	K-1 World GP 2015 -70kg Championship Tournament	Tokyo, Japan	Decision (unanimous)	3	3:00
2015-04-19	Win	(Japan) Yuta Kubo	K-1 World GP 2015 -55kg Championship Tournament	Tokyo, Japan	Decision (unanimous)	3	3:00
2014-11-03	Loss	(Thailand) Kaew Fairtex	K-1 World GP 2014 -65kg Championship Tournament, Final	Shibuya, Tokyo, Japan	Decision (Majority)	3	3:00
Fight was for K-1 -65kg Championship.
2014-11-03	Win	(Japan) Hiroya	K-1 World GP 2014 -65kg Championship Tournament, Semi Finals	Shibuya, Tokyo, Japan	Decision (Majority)	3	3:00
2014-11-03	Win	(Brazil) Minoru Kimura	K-1 World GP 2014 -65kg Championship Tournament, Quarter Finals	Shibuya, Tokyo, Japan	TKO (2 Knockdowns/body knees)	2	2:43
2014-03-30	Win	(Thailand) Tapruwan Hadesworkout	RISE 98	Tokyo, Japan	Decision (Unanimous)	3	3:00
2013-11-04	Win	(Germany) Kevin Eiberg	RISE 96	Tokyo, Japan	Decision (Unanimous)	3	3:00
2013-07-19	Win	(South Korea) Lee Sung-hyun	RISE 94	Tokyo, Japan	Decision (Majority)	3	3:00
2013-03-17	Win	(Japan) Koji Yoshimoto	RISE 92	Tokyo, Japan	Decision (Majority)	5	3:00
Won RISE -65kg Title.
2012-10-25	Win	(Japan) Yukihiro Komiya	RISE 90	Tokyo, Japan	Decision (Unanimous)	3	3:00
2012-06-02	Win	(South Korea) Kim Dong-soo	RISE 88	Tokyo, Japan	TKO	3	2:29
2012-01-28	Loss	(Japan) Koji Yoshimoto	RISE 86	Tokyo, Japan	Decision (Unanimous)	5	3:00
Fight was for RISE Lightweight Belt.
2011-09-23	Win	(Japan) Kotetsu	RISE 83	Tokyo, Japan	KO	2	1:08
2011-06-25	Win	(Japan) Shingo Yokoyama	K-1 World MAX 2011 –63 kg Japan Tournament Final	Tokyo, Japan	Decision (Unanimous)	3	3:00
2011-04-17	Win	(Japan) Tomo Kiire	RISE 76	Tokyo, Japan	Ext.R Decision (Split)	4	3:00
2011-02-27	Win	(Japan) AKIRA	RISE 74	Tokyo, Japan	KO (Right Low Kicks)	3	1:11
2010-12-19	Win	(Japan) Kewpie	RISE 73	Tokyo, Japan	Decision (Unanimous)	3	3:00
2010-10-03	Win	(Japan) Snake Atsushi	RISE 71	Tokyo, Japan	KO (Right Low Kicks)	2	0:49
2010-05-16	Win	(South Korea) Kwon Min Seok	RISE 65	Tokyo, Japan	Decision (Majority)	3	3:00
2009-11-22	Win	(Japan) Masanori Gojou	RISE 60	Tokyo, Japan	Decision (Unanimous)	3	3:00
2009-10-04	Win	(Japan) Atsushi Hori	RISE 59 RISING ROOKIES CUP Final	Tokyo, Japan	Decision (Unanimous)	3	3:00
Won RISE ROOKIES CUP 65kg championship .
2009-08-23	Win	(Japan) Koichi Ishizuka	RISE 58 RISING ROOKIES CUP Semi Finals	Tokyo, Japan	Ext.R Decision (Unanimous)	4	3:00
2009-04-26	Win	(Japan) Ryuji Yamaguchi	R.I.S.E. 54 RISING ROOKIES CUP Quarter Finals	Tokyo, Japan	KO (Left Hook)	1	0:40
Legend: Win Loss Draw/No contest Notes

== See also ==
- List of male kickboxers
