= Hiroya (kickboxer) =

Japanese kickboxer (born 1992)

- Born: Kawabe Hiroya (河部 弘也); January 6, 1992 (age 34); Aikawa, Kanagawa, Japan
- Height: 1.69 m (5 ft 6 1/2 in)
- Weight: 63 kg (139 lb; 9.9 st)
- Division: Lightweight
- Style: Kickboxing
- Team: Try Hard Gym
- Years active: 2007–present

Kickboxing record
- Total: 34
- Wins: 34
- By knockout: 17
- Losses
- By knockout: 15

Other information
- Notable relatives: Taiga (brother)
- Website: http://www.hiroya1992.com/
- Last updated on: January 6, 2014

Hiroya (born 6 January 1992) is a Japanese kickboxer.

== Career ==
He made his K-1 debut at the K-1 World MAX 2007 Japan Tournament in one of the opening fights as the youngest contestant at the age of 15 on February 5, 2007.

On February 25, 2012, he lost to Naoki via split decision at Big Bang 8 in Tokyo.

He moved up to 65 kg and stopped Chonden Chuwattana with low kicks just thirty seconds into round two at Big Bang 11 on December 2, 2012.

He beat Keiji Ozaki by majority decision in a non-tournament bout at Krush Grand Prix 2013 ~67kg Tournament First Round~ on January 14, 2013 in Tokyo.

Hiroya had his rubber match with Masaaki Noiri in the quarter-finals of the Road to Glory Japan -65kg Slam on March 10, 2013. He lost the close fight by majority decision due to a point deduction for low blows.

He lost to NOMAN is an extension round split decision at Krush.29 in Tokyo on June 16, 2013.

He beat Sapanpetch Sit-Itisukato by decision at MAX Muay Thai 4 in Sendai, Japan on October 6, 2013.

He knocked out Igor Liubchenko with a second round high kick at MAX Muay Thai 5: The Final Chapter in Khon Kaen, Thailand on December 10, 2013.

== Titles and accomplishments ==
=== Professional ===
- Krush
  - 2014 Krush -65Kg Champion

=== Amateur ===
- 2008 K-1 Koshien Champion
- 2007 K-1 Koshien runner-up
- 2006 AFK Asian Championships Junior Low Kick -54 kg Champion
- 2006 WMF World Championships Junior -54 kg (silver)
- 2005 WMF World Championships Junior -45 kg (gold)

== Fight record ==
Professional Muay Thai & kickboxing record
32 wins (21 (T)KOs), 17 losses, 0 draws, 0 no contests
Date	Result	Opponent	Event	Location	Method	Round	Time
2019-10-12	Loss	(Japan) Takuma Konishi	Rizin 19 - Osaka	Osaka, Japan	KO (left knee to the head)	1	
2018-11-17	Win	(Japan) Yojiro Uchimura	RISE 129	Tokyo, Japan	KO (left hook)	2	0:15
2018-06-17	Win	(Japan) Hiroyuki Takaya	RISE 129	Tokyo, Japan	KO (right hook)	3	0:59
2017-09-29	Loss	(Thailand) Singmanee Kaewsamrit	EM Legend 23	China	Decision (unanimous)	3	3:00
2017-04-22	Loss	(Japan) Tetsuya Yamato	K-1 World GP 2017 Super Bantamweight Championship Tournament	Tokyo, Japan	KO (left hook)	2	1:06
2016-11-26	Win	(China) Wang Yuanlei	Faith Fight Championship	China	KO (right cross)	1	2:59
2016-09-23	Win	(Russia) Rasul Kachakaev	EM Legend	China	TKO (body shots)	3	1:55
2016-06-24	Loss	(Thailand) Kaew Fairtex	K-1 World GP 2016 -65kg World Tournament, Quarter Finals	Tokyo, Japan	KO (left hook)	1	0:36
2016-03-04	Loss	(Japan) Masaaki Noiri	K-1 World GP 2016 -65kg Japan Tournament, Semi Finals	Tokyo, Japan	Decision (majority)	3	3:00
2016-03-04	Win	(Japan) Naoki Terasaki	K-1 World GP 2016 -65kg Japan Tournament, Quarter Finals	Tokyo, Japan	KO (high kick)	1	2:19
2015-12-29	Win	(Japan) Wicky Nishiura	Rizin World Grand Prix 2015: Part 1 - Saraba	Saitama, Japan	KO (punches)	3	1:20
2015-04-19	Loss	(Brazil) Minoru Kimura	K-1 World GP 2015 -55kg Championship Tournament	Tokyo, Japan	TKO (3 knockdowns)	1	2:45
2014-11-03	Loss	(Japan) Yasuomi Soda	K-1 World GP 2014 -65kg Championship Tournament, Semi Finals	Tokyo, Japan	Decision (majority)	3	3:00
2014-11-03	Win	(Australia) Michael Thompson	K-1 World GP 2014 -65kg Championship Tournament, Quarter Finals	Tokyo, Japan	Decision (majority)	3	3:00
2014-07-13	Loss	(Japan) Naoki Terasaki	Krush 43	Tokyo, Japan	KO (right cross)	1	1:29
Loses the Krush -65kg title.
2014-03-08	Win	(Japan) TaCa	Krush 39, Super Lightweight Championship Tournament Final	Tokyo, Japan	KO (low kick)	2	1:37
Wins the inaugural Krush -65kg title.
2014-03-08	Win	(Japan) NOMAN	Krush 39, Super Lightweight Championship Tournament Semi Final	Tokyo, Japan	KO (high kick)	2	1:21
2014-01-04	Win	(Japan) Kohei Nishikawa	Krush 37	Tokyo, Japan	TKO (3 knockdowns)	2	2:46
2013-12-10	Win	(Ukraine) Igor Liubchenko	MAX Muay Thai 5: The Final Chapter	Khon Kaen, Thailand	KO (high kick)	2	
2013-10-06	Win	(Thailand) Sapanpetch Sit Itiskat	MAX Muay Thai 4	Sendai, Japan	Decision	3	3:00
2013-09-21	Win	(Japan) Atsushi Ogata	Krush 33	Tokyo, Japan	Decision (unanimous)	3	3:00
2013-06-16	Loss	(Japan) NOMAN	Krush 29	Tokyo, Japan	Ext.R decision (split)	4	3:00
2013-03-10	Loss	(Japan) Masaaki Noiri	Road to Glory Japan 65 kg Tournament, Quarter Finals	Tokyo, Japan	Decision (majority)	3	3:00
2013-01-14	Win	(Japan) Keiji Ozaki	Krush Grand Prix 2013 ~67 kg Tournament First Round~	Tokyo, Japan	Decision (majority)	3	3:00
2012-12-02	Win	(Thailand) Chondern Chuwattana	Bigbang 11	Tokyo, Japan	TKO (low kicks)	2	0:30
2012-09-09	Loss	(Japan) Hisaki Higashimoto	Krush 2012 Youth GP -63 kg Tournament, First Round	Tokyo, Japan	KO (left hook)	1	1:01
2012-07-21	Win	(Japan) Daizo Sasaki	Krush.20	Tokyo, Japan	KO (low kick)	3	2:43
2012-05-03	Loss	(Japan) Ryuji Kajiwara	Krush.18	Tokyo, Japan	Decision (unanimous)	3	3:00
2012-02-25	Loss	(Japan) Naoki	Bigbang 8	Tokyo, Japan	Decision (split)	3	3:00
2011-12-09	Loss	(Japan) Masaaki Noiri	Krush.14, YOUTH GP 2011 Semi Finals	Tokyo, Japan	Decision (unanimous)	3	3:00
2011-10-10	Win	(Japan) Sho Ogawa	Krush YOUTH GP 2011 Opening, Quarter Finals	Tokyo, Japan	Decision (unanimous)	3	3:00
2011-10-10	Win	(Japan) Daiki Hoshikawa	Krush YOUTH GP 2011 Opening, First Round	Tokyo, Japan	KO (low kick)	1	1:35
2011-06-25	Loss	(Japan) Tetsuya Yamato	K-1 World MAX 2011 –63 kg Japan Tournament Final, Quarter final	Tokyo, Japan	Decision (unanimous)	3	3:00
2011-05-15	Win	(Japan) Akihiro Kuroda	Bigbang 5	Tokyo, Japan	Decision (unanimous)	3	3:00
2011-03-26	Win	(Japan) Tomas Nakamura	SNKA MAGNUM 25	Tokyo, Japan	Decision (unanimous)	3	3:00
2010-11-08	Loss	(Japan) Yuta Kubo	K-1 World MAX 2010 -70kg World Championship Tournament Final	Tokyo, Japan	Decision (unanimous)	3	3:00
2009-07-13	Win	(United States) Federico Lopez	K-1 World MAX 2009 World Championship Tournament Final 8	Tokyo, Japan	Decision (unanimous)	3	3:00
2009-02-23	Win	(Japan) Kiazemon Saiga	K-1 World MAX 2009 Japan Tournament	Tokyo, Japan	Decision (majority)	3	3:00
2008-11-17	Win	(Thailand) Taweesaklek Sor.Wongthong	Petchaophraya, Rajadamnern Stadium	Bangkok, Thailand	KO (body punches)	3	
2008-07-27	Win	(Thailand) Kungthong HangthongYaowarat	Chujaroen + True Visions 62, Rajadamnern Stadium	Bangkok, Thailand	KO (left hook)	1	1:30
2008-06-29	Win	(Thailand)	Chujaroen + True Visions 62, Rajadamnern Stadium	Bangkok, Thailand	KO	2	
2008-05-22	Loss	(Thailand) Sakkasem Kiatyongyut	Kiatyongyut, Rajadamnern Stadium	Bangkok, Thailand	Decision	5	3:00
2008-04-09	Win	(Japan) Tsukasa Fuji	K-1 World MAX 2008 World Championship Tournament FINAL 16	Hiroshima, Japan	Decision (unanimous)	3	3:00
2008-02-02	Win	(Netherlands) Robbie Hageman	K-1 World MAX 2008 Japan Tournament	Tokyo, Japan	KO (left hook)	2	
2007-10-03	Win	(South Korea) Kwon Min Seok	K-1 World MAX 2007 World Championship Final	Tokyo, Japan	Decision (unanimous)	3	3:00
2007-06-23	Win	(Thailand) Sakdar Lukromkrao	Bigbang 11	Tokyo, Japan	TKO (referee stoppage)	2	
2007-06-23	Win	(Netherlands) Roy Tan	K-1 World Grand Prix 2007 in Amsterdam	Amsterdam, Netherlands	Decision (unanimous)	3	3:00
2007-04-04	Win	(Japan) Noritaka Nishimura	K-1 World MAX 2007 World Elite Showcase	Yokohama, Japan	TKO	1	2:47
Legend: Win Loss Draw/no contest Notes

Amateur kickboxing record
Date	Result	Opponent	Event	Location	Method	Round	Time
2009-12-31	Loss	(Japan) Masaaki Noiri	Dynamite!! 2009, K-1 Koshien 2009 Tournament Semi Finals	Saitama, Japan	Decision (unanimous)	3	2:00
2009-10-26	Win	(Japan) Ryuya Kusakabe	K-1 World MAX 2009 World Championship Tournament Final, K-1 Koshien 2009 Tournament Quarter Finals	Saitama, Japan	Decision (unanimous)	3	2:00
2009-08-10	Win	(Japan) Kohei Nishikawa	K-1 Koshien 2009 King of Under 18 Tournament First Round	Japan	Decision (unanimous)	3	2:00
2008-12-31	Win	(Japan) Koya Urabe	Dynamite!! 2008 K-1 Koshien 2008 King of Under 18 Tournament Final	Saitama, Japan	Ext.R decision	4	3:00
Wins the K-1 Koshien 2008 King of Under 18 Tournament title.
2008-12-31	Win	(Japan) Shota Shimada	Dynamite!! 2008 K-1 Koshien 2008 King of Under 18 Tournament Semi Finals	Saitama, Japan	Decision	3	3:00
2008-08-29	Win	(Japan) Kengo Sonoda	K-1 Koshien 2008 King of Under 18 Final 16	Japan	Decision	3	3:00
2007-12-31	Loss	(Japan) Yudai	K-1 PREMIUM 2007 Dynamite!! K-1 Koshien 2007 King of Under 18 Tournament Final	Osaka, Japan	Ext.R decision (split)	3	3:00
2007-12-31	Win	(Japan) Kizaemon Saiga	K-1 PREMIUM 2007 Dynamite!! K-1 Koshien 2007 King of Under 18 Tournament Semi Finals	Osaka, Japan	Decision	3	3:00
2007-02-05	Win	(Japan) Akihiro Takahashi	K-1 World MAX 2007 Japan Tournament	Tokyo, Japan	TKO (towel thrown)	3	2:45
2006-03-26	Loss	(Russia) Vladimir Topchiyan	WMF World Championships 2006, Final	Bangkok, Thailand	Decision
Wins WMF World Championship Junior -54kg Silver Medal.
2006-03-	Win		WMF World Championships 2006, Semi Final	Bangkok, Thailand	Decision
2006-01-15	Win	(Japan) Kazuki Suzuki	WMF Japan	Tokyo, Japan	Decision (unanimous)	3	2:00
2005-03-26	Win		WMF World Championships 2005, Final	Bangkok, Thailand	Decision
Wins WMF World Championship Junior -45kg Gold Medal.
2005-03-	Win	(Australia)	WMF World Championships 2005, Semi Final	Bangkok, Thailand	Decision

Legend: Win Loss Draw/no contest Notes

== Mixed rules record ==
Professional record breakdown
1 match	0 wins	1 loss
By submission	0	1

Res.	Record	Opponent	Method	Event	Date	Round	Time	Location	Notes
Loss	0–1	Shibatar	Submission (armbar)	Rizin 26	December 31, 2020	2		Saitama, Japan	Openweight bout. Originally a draw was overturned by Rizin officials.

== See also ==
- List of male kickboxers
- List of K-1 events
