= Minoru Kimura =

Brazilian kickboxer (born 1993)

- Born: Minoru Philip Kimura; September 9, 1993 (age 33); Curitiba, Paraná, Brazil
- Height: 172 cm (5 ft 8 in)
- Weight: 70 kg (150 lb; 11 st)
- Division: Super lightweight Welterweight; Super welterweight
- Style: Kickboxing
- Fighting out of: Tokyo, Japan
- Team: Battle Box; Purge Tokyo (former); K-1 Gym Gotanda Team Kings (former); Fighting Kairos/My Way gym (former); Tanabe Gym (former)

Kickboxing record
- Total: 51
- Wins: 37
- By knockout: 30
- Losses: 11
- By knockout: 9
- Draws: 1
- No contests: 2

Mixed martial arts record
- Total: 1
- Wins: 0
- Losses: 1
- By knockout: 1

Minoru Kimura (木村 ミノル, Kimura Minoru) is a Brazilian kickboxer fighting out of Battle Box Gym. He is the former K-1 Super Welterweight champion. He has faced several notable fighters of his weight division such as Kaew Fairtex, Hideaki Yamazaki, Yasuomi Soda, Masaaki Noiri, Massaro Glunder and Hiroya.

He was ranked in the featherweight top ten by Combat Press between June 2015 and March 2017. He was also ranked in the top ten by Liverkick.com.

== Kickboxing ==
=== Krush title run ===
He began his kickboxing career fight under the banner of MA Japan. He amassed an 8-2-1 record with them, with six of his wins coming by KO. He capped off his time with MA Japan by winning the MA Japan Super Lightweight Championship.

In his Krush debut, Kimura fought NOMAN. He beat him by KO in the first round. In his second fight with Krush, he KO'd Daizo Sasaki in the first round. In his third fight with Krush, he TKO'd Ryuji Kajiwara in the third round.

Following his three fight winning streak, Kimura fought Yuji Takeuchi in a 63 kg title eliminator. He won by a first round KO.

Minoru fought the reigning Krush Lightweight champion Hideaki Yamazaki during Krush 35. Yamazaki won by KO, just 47 seconds into the fight.

=== K-1 Super Lightweight title run ===
Kimura rebounded from his failed title bid with a TKO win over Daizo Sasaki during Krush 39. In his next fight he faced the forme Krush and ISKA champion Thomas Adamandopoulos, whom he beat by a second round TKO.

Kimura took part in the 2014 K-1 Super Lightweight Grand Prix. He lost to Yasuomi Soda in the quarter finals.

Kimura was scheduled to fight the 2014 K-1 Welterweight Grand Prix winner Kaew Fairtex in January 2015. Kimura won by majority decision. He beat Hiroya by a first round TKO. He beat Massaro Glunder by decision, after an extra fought round was fought. He was scheduled to fight Ren Hiramoto during K-1's 2015 Survival Wars. He won the fight by unanimous decision.

His four fight winning streak earned him a chance to fight for the K-1 Super Lightweight title in a rematch with Kaew Fairtex in November 2015. Fairtex won by KO in the first round.

=== Winning the Krush title ===
Following his failed title, Kimura traded wins and losses over his next five fights. The first loss was to Masaaki Noiri in the K-1 Welterweight Grand Prix quarter finals. Noiri beat him by KO in the first round. He beat NOMAN by a unanimous decision in June 2016. He lost to Kohei Nishikawa by KO during Krush 74. He beat Kenji during Krush 76 by a first round TKO.

He took part in the 2017 K-1 Welterweight Grand Prix, and faced Yuta Kubo in the quarter finals. Kimura lost a unanimous decision.

Minoru was scheduled to fight Yasuhiro Kido in November 2017. He won the fight by unanimous decision to begin a four fight winning streak. Kimura fought Jin Hirayama during K'Festa 1, and won the fight by a first round KO. He fought Kazuki Yamagiwa in June 2018, and won the fight by a first round left hook KO.

Kimura fought Hitoshi Tsukakoshi, during Krush 91, for the Krush Welterweight title. He won the fight by TKO, after knocking Tsukakoshi down three times in the first round.

=== Krush title reign ===
After winning the Krush title, he lost to Jordann Pikeur by TKO, after being knocked down three times inside of the third round. Minoru fought Hiromi Wajima during K'Festa 2. He won the fight by a first round KO.

Kimura's first title defense was against Kaisei Kondo during Krush 101. He beat Kondo in the second round by KO.

Kimura fought Cruz Briggs in June 2019. He beat Briggs by a first round KO. Kimura was scheduled to face Sho Oizumi two months later. He beat Oizumi by a first round KO. Minoru faced Jordan Valdinocci at K-1's 2019 Yokohamatsuri event. Valdinocci came into the fight as a late replacement. He won the fight in the second round, by a body shot KO. He fought Marcel Adeyemi in December 2019. He beat Adeyemi by a first round KO.

=== K-1 Title reign ===
Kimura participated in K-1's 2020 Super Welterweight tournament. He won the quarterfinal bout against Kaito by a first round KO. He defeated Eder Lopes in the semifinals by first round KO as well. In the tournament finals he faced Hiromi Wajima, whom he likewise beat by a first round KO.

He was scheduled to fight the HEAT Kick Middleweight champion Abiral Ghimire during K-1 World GP 2020 in Tokyo in a non-title bout. He won the fight by TKO in the second round, after the ringside doctor stopped the fight, due to a cut above Abiral's left eye.

Kimura was scheduled to make his first K-1 Welterweight title defense against Hiromi Wajima, whom he had previously beaten by knockout, at K-1 World GP 2021 in Osaka on December 4, 2021. He lost the fight by a third-round knockout, as he was unable to beat the eight count after suffering a body kick knockdown.

=== Knock Out ===
Kimura made his KNOCK OUT promotional debut against the KNOCK OUT RED Super Welterweight champion Kuntap Charoenchai at KNOCK OUT 2023 SUPER BOUT BLAZE on March 5, 2023. He knocked Kuntap out less than a minute into the bout. The bout was eventually overturned to a no contest after Kimura confessed having been using performance enhancing drugs before the bout.

=== Rizin ===
Kimura made his Rizin return at Rizin 43 – Sapporo on June 24, 2023 against Daryl Lokoku, knocking him out with a left hook in the first round. However subsequently it was revealed that Kimura himself had requested to be tested for anabolic steroids and the results to be publicly announced. Eventually Kimura tested positive for steroids, and the win over Lokoku was overturned to no contest. After testing positive, Kimura admitted to having used performance enhancing drugs before the two previous bouts, which were also overturned to no contest.

Kimura was scheduled to face Rukiya Anpo at Rizin 45 on December 31, 2023. The fight was called off when Kimura tested positive for a banned substance.

After the suspension Kimura faced Buakaw Banchamek at Rizin Landmark 9 on March 23, 2024. He lost the bout via second round knockout.

=== Return to K-1 ===
Kimura made his return to K-1 at K-1 World MAX 2025 - World Tournament Opening Round, facing Mason Strodtman in the Qualifying Round. He knocked Strodtman out in the first round, dropping him multiple times before finally knocking him out with a left hook.

Kimura was initially scheduled to face Stoyan Koprivlenski at K-1 World MAX 2025 - World Championship Tournament Final, Quarterfinals, but was withdrawn after suffering an injury.

== Mixed martial arts ==
In September 2016, Kimura made his mixed martial arts debut for the Rizin Fighting Federation in Tokyo. He faced Charles Bennett and lost the fight via TKO just seven seconds into the first round.

== Titles and accomplishments ==
- K-1
  - 2020 K-1 World GP 2020 –70 kg Championship Tournament winner
  - 2020 K-1 "Fighter of the Year" Award
- Krush
  - 2018 Krush Welterweight Champion
- Martial Arts Japan Kickboxing Federation
  - 2012 MAJKF Super Lightweight Champion
  - 2011 MAJKF Rookie Tournament winner

== Kickboxing record ==
Kickboxing record
37 wins (30 (T)KOs), 11 losses, 1 draw, 2 no contests
Date	Result	Opponent	Event	Location	Method	Round	Time
2025-09-07	Win	(United States) Mason Strodtman	K-1 World MAX 2025 - World Tournament Opening Round	Tokyo, Japan	KO (left hook)	1	1:15
Qualifies for K-1 World MAX 2025 World Championship Tournament Final.
2024-03-23	Loss	(Thailand) Buakaw Banchamek	Rizin Landmark 9	Kobe, Japan	KO (right cross)	2	1:19
2023-06-24	NC	(Democratic Republic of the Congo) Daryl Lokoku	Rizin 43 – Sapporo	Sapporo, Japan	Overturned	1	1:08
Originally a KO win for Kimura. The result was changed to a no contest after he tested positive for a banned substance.
2023-03-05	NC	(Thailand) Kuntap Charoenchai	KNOCK OUT 2023 SUPER BOUT BLAZE	Tokyo, Japan	Overturned	1	0:32
Originally a KO win for Kimura, later ruled a no contest after testing positive for a banned substance
2021-12-04	Loss	(Japan) Hiromi Wajima	K-1 World GP 2021 in Osaka	Osaka, Japan	KO (body kick)	3	2:50
Loses the K-1 Super Welterweight title.
2020-12-13	Win	(Nepal) Abiral Himalayan Cheetah	K-1 World GP 2020 Winter's Crucial Bout	Tokyo, Japan	TKO (doctor stoppage)	2	2:50
2020-03-22	Win	(Japan) Hiromi Wajima	K-1: K’Festa 3, -70 kg Tournament Final	Saitama, Japan	TKO (corner stoppage)	1	1:10
Wins the 2020 K-1 World GP -70kg Tournament and wins the vacant K-1 Super Welterweight title.
2020-03-22	Win	(Portugal) Eder Lopes	K-1: K’Festa 3, -70 kg Tournament Semi Finals	Saitama, Japan	KO (right cross)	1	1:02
2020-03-22	Win	(Japan) Kaito	K-1: K’Festa 3, -70 kg Tournament Quarter Finals	Saitama, Japan	KO (punches)	1	2:10
2019-12-28	Win	(Nigeria) Marcel Adeyemi	K-1 World GP 2019 Japan: ～Women's Flyweight Championship Tournament～	Nagoya, Japan	KO (punches)	1	1:18
2019-11-24	Win	(Italy) Jordan Valdinocci	K-1 World GP 2019 Yokohamatsuri	Yokohama, Japan	KO (body punches)	2	2:28
2019-08-24	Win	(Japan) Sho Oizumi	K-1 World GP 2019: Japan vs World 5 vs 5 & Special Superfight in Osaka	Osaka, Japan	KO (punches)	1	2:17
2019-06-30	Win	(Australia) Cruz Briggs	K-1 World GP 2019: Super Bantamweight World Tournament	Saitama, Japan	KO (right overhand)	1	1:37
2019-05-18	Win	(Japan) Kaisei Kondo	Krush 101	Tokyo, Japan	TKO (body punches)	2	1:43
Defends Krush Welterweight belt.
2019-03-10	Win	(Japan) Hiromi Wajima	K-1 World GP 2019: K’FESTA 2	Saitama, Japan	KO (left hook)	1	2:20
2018-11-03	Loss	(Netherlands) Jordann Pikeur	K-1 World GP 2018: 3rd Super Lightweight Championship Tournament	Saitama, Japan	KO (4 knockdowns)	3	1:30
2018-08-05	Win	(Japan) Hitoshi Tsukakoshi	Krush 91	Japan	TKO (3 knockdowns)	1	1:44
Won Krush Welterweight belt.
2018-06-17	Win	(Japan) Kazuki Yamagiwa	K-1 World GP 2018: 2nd Featherweight Championship Tournament	Saitama, Japan	KO (left hook)	1	2:48
2018-03-21	Win	(Japan) Jin Hirayama	K-1 World GP 2018: K'FESTA.1	Saitama, Japan	KO (right hook)	1	2:50
2017-11-23	Win	(Japan) Yasuhiro Kido	K-1 World GP 2017 Heavyweight Championship Tournament, Superfight	Japan	Decision (unanimous)	3	3:00
2017-09-18	Loss	(Japan) Yuta Kubo	K-1 World GP 2016 -67.5kg World Tournament, Quarter Finals	Tokyo, Japan	Decision (unanimous)	3	3:00
2017-05-28	Win	(Japan) Kenji	Krush 76	Tokyo, Japan	TKO (3 knockdowns)	1	1:16
2017-03-03	Loss	(Japan) Kohei Nishikawa	Krush 74	Tokyo, Japan	KO (right hook)	1	2:15
2016-06-24	Win	(Japan) NOMAN	K-1 World GP 2016 -65kg World Tournament, Reserve Fight	Tokyo, Japan	Decision (unanimous)	3	3:00
2016-03-04	Loss	(Japan) Masaaki Noiri	K-1 World GP 2016 -65kg Japan Tournament, Quarter Finals	Tokyo, Japan	KO (knee to the body)	1	2:54
2015-11-21	Loss	(Thailand) Kaew Fairtex	K-1 World GP 2015 The Championship	Tokyo, Japan	KO (punches)	1	2:55
Fight was for K-1 -65kg Championship.
2015-09-22	Win	(Japan) Ren Hiramoto	K-1 World GP 2015 Survival Wars	Tokyo, Japan	Decision (unanimous)	3	3:00
2015-07-04	Win	(Netherlands) Massaro Glunder	K-1 World GP 2015 -70kg Championship Tournament	Tokyo, Japan	Ext.R decision (unanimous)	4	3:00
2015-04-19	Win	(Japan) Hiroya	K-1 World GP 2015 -55kg Championship Tournament	Tokyo, Japan	TKO (3 knockdowns)	1	2:45
2015-01-18	Win	(Thailand) Kaew Fairtex	K-1 World GP 2015 -60kg Championship Tournament	Tokyo, Japan	Decision (majority)	3	3:00
2014-11-03	Loss	(Japan) Yasuomi Soda	K-1 World GP 2014 -65kg Championship Tournament, Quarter Finals	Tokyo, Japan	TKO (2 knockdowns)	2	2:43
2014-08-24	Win	(Japan) Tomihira Yoshihito	Krush 45 in NAGOYA	Nagoya, Japan	KO (right cross)	2	2:23
2014-06-12	Win	(France) Thomas Adamandopoulos	Krush 42	Tokyo, Japan	TKO (3 knockdowns)	2	2:55
2014-03-08	Win	(Japan) Daizo Sasaki	Krush 39	Tokyo, Japan	TKO (3 knockdowns)	1	2:49
2013-12-14	Loss	(Japan) Hideaki Yamazaki	Krush 35	Tokyo, Japan	KO (overhand right)	1	0:47
For the Krush Lightweight title.
2013-09-21	Win	(Japan) Yuji Takeuchi	Krush 33 - Next Challenger fight	Tokyo, Japan	KO (punches)	1	2:07
2013-05-12	Win	(Japan) Ryuji Kajiwara	Krush 28	Tokyo, Japan	TKO (doctor stoppage)	3	1:50
2013-03-03	Win	(Japan) Daizo Sasaki	Krush-IGNITION 2013 vol.2	Tokyo, Japan	KO (punches)	1	2:19
2013-01-14	Win	(Japan) NOMAN	Krush Grand Prix 2013	Tokyo, Japan	TKO (punches)	1	2:29
2012-12-09	Win	(Japan) Hidekazu Tanaka	MAJKF BREAK-32 SEIZE	Tokyo, Japan	KO (right hook)	4	0:39
Wins MAJKF Japan Super Lightweight title.
2012-09-09	Loss	(Japan) Hiroto Yamaguchi	Krush YOUTH GP 2012 63 kg First round	Tokyo, Japan	KO (left hook)	2	2:01
2012-07-15	Loss	(Japan) Sho Ogawa	MAJKF KICK GUTS 2012	Tokyo, Japan	Decision (unanimous)	3	3:00
2012-06-03	Win	(Japan) Kazuma	MAJKF ~ KICKBOXING Sentokai Samurai 10	Tokyo, Japan	Decision (unanimous)	3	3:00
2012-03-18	Win	(Japan) Wajo	MAJKF BREAK-24 SAGITTARIUS	Tokyo, Japan	TKO (corner stoppage)	3	0:39
2011-11-20	Win	(Japan) Black Dragon	MAJKF BREAK-20 ～RAISE～ - 2011 Rookie tournament final	Tokyo, Japan	TKO (3 knockdowns)	1	2:38
Wins MAJKF 2011 Rookie Tournament.
2011-10-09	Win	(Japan) Chibita	MAJKF BREAK-18 Sils - 2011 Rookie tournament semi-finals	Tokyo, Japan	KO	1	1:35
2011-08-28	Win	(Japan) Kohei Ishigaki	SNKA BRAVE HEARTS 17	Tokyo, Japan	KO (punches)	1	2:25
2011-07-18	Win	(Japan) Kensuke Fujita	MAJKF BREAK-16 ～GRASP～ - 2011 Rookie tournament quarter-finals	Tokyo, Japan	TKO (2 knockdowns rule)	3	0:43
2011-05-29	Win	(Japan) Satoru Hashimoto	MAJKF Sentokai Samurai 8 - 2011 Rookie tournament final 16	Tokyo, Japan	Decision (unanimous)	3	3:00
2011-02-27	Win	(Japan) Kazuma	MAJKF BREAK-10 DICE	Tokyo, Japan	KO (2 knockdowns rule)	1	0:59
2010-09-20	Draw	(Japan) Ryusuke Takeoka	MAJKF Sentokai Samurai Budokai 2	Tokyo, Japan	Decision (majority)	3	3:00
Legend: Win Loss Draw/no contest Notes

Amateur Kickboxing record
Date	Result	Opponent	Event	Location	Method	Round	Time
2011-08-27	Win	(Japan) Yusuke Komiyama	K-1 Koshien East Japan Selection, Final	Tokyo, Japan	Decision (unanimous)	1	
2011-08-27	Win	(Japan) Yusuke Ami	K-1 Koshien East Japan Selection, Semi Final	Tokyo, Japan	KO	1	
2011-08-27	Win	(Japan) Haruki Nihei	K-1 Koshien East Japan Selection, Quarter Final	Tokyo, Japan	Decision (unanimous)	1	
2011-08-27	Win	(Japan) Iyori Akiba	K-1 Koshien East Japan Selection, Second round	Tokyo, Japan	Decision (unanimous)	1	
2011-08-27	Win	(Japan) Seichi Hokao	K-1 Koshien East Japan Selection, First round	Tokyo, Japan	KO		
Legend: Win Loss Draw/no contest Notes

== Mixed martial arts record ==
Professional record breakdown
1 match	0 wins	1 loss
By knockout	0	1

Res.	Record	Opponent	Method	Event	Date	Round	Time	Location	Notes
Loss	0–1	Charles Bennett	TKO (punches)	Rizin World Grand Prix 2016: 1st Round	September 25, 2016	1	0:07	Saitama, Japan	Featherweight debut.

== Custom rules record ==
Professional record breakdown
6 matches	3 wins	2 losses
By knockout	2	2
By submission	0	0
By decision	1	0
Draws	0	
No contests	1	

Res.	Record	Opponent	Method	Event	Date	Round	Time	Location	Notes
Loss	3–2 (1)	Jo Miyahara	TKO (punches)	KNOCK OUT.68	September 5, 2026	1	1:28	Yokohama, Japan	Catchweight (75 kg) bout. Knock out Unlimited rules
Win	3–1 (1)	Kusa MAX	TKO (punches)	KNOCK OUT.65 ～THE KNOCK OUT 2026～	June 21, 2026	1	0:08	Tokyo, Japan	Catchweight (73 kg) bout. Knock out Unlimited rules
Loss	2–1 (1)	Spike Carlyle	TKO (punches)	KNOCK OUT 63	18 April 2026	1	0:26	Okinawa, Japan	Knock Out unlimited rules.
Win	2–0 (1)	Dane Edge	Decision (unanimous)	Ganryujima Virtual Survival 2	7 September 2024	3	3:00	Tokyo, Japan	Boxing rules.
Win	1–0 (1)	Amadou Dia	KO (left hook)	Ganryujima Virtual Fight	3 May 2024	1	1:03	Tokyo, Japan	Boxing rules with no decision and no extension
NC	0–0 (1)	Yusuke Yachi	No contest	INOKI BOM-BA-YE x Ganryujima	28 December 2022	1	1:06	Tokyo, Japan	Round 1 kickboxing rules, round 2 MMA rules, draw if bout goes to time limit. Initially a knockout win for Kimura, but was overturned after he failed a drug test.

== See also ==
- List of male kickboxers
- List of K-1 champions
