= Dynamite!! 2008 =

K-1 and Dream martial arts event in 2008

Dynamite 2008
- The poster for Dynamite 2008
- Promotion: DREAM, K-1
- Date: December 31, 2008
- Venue: Saitama Super Arena
- City: Saitama, Japan
- Attendance: 25,634

Event chronology
K-1 PREMIUM 2007 Dynamite!!	Dynamite 2008	Dynamite!! 2009

Dynamite!! 2008 was the annual kickboxing and mixed martial arts event held by K-1 & DREAM on New Year's Eve, Wednesday, December 31, 2008, at the Saitama Super Arena in Saitama, Japan. It featured eleven DREAM mixed martial arts rules fights in a variety of weight classes, four K-1 rules fights, and the inaugural K-1 KOSHIEN Under 18 high school tournament.

== Results ==
DREAM MMA Rules
Weight class				Method	Round	Time	Notes
Middleweight	Kiyoshi Tamura	def.	Kazushi Sakuraba	Unanimous decision (20–18, 20–18, 20–18)	2	5:00
Lightweight	Shinya Aoki	def.	Eddie Alvarez	Submission (heel hook)	1	1:32	(Note: For the WAMMA Lightweight Champion.)
Heavyweight	Melvin Manhoef	def.	Mark Hunt	KO (punches)	1	0:18
Heavyweight	Mirko Cro Cop	def.	Hong Man Choi	TKO (leg kick)	1	6:32
Welterweight	Hayato "Mach" Sakurai	def.	Katsuyori Shibata	TKO (referee stoppage)	1	7:02
Heavyweight	Semmy Schilt	def.	Mighty Mo	Submission (triangle choke)	1	5:31
Heavyweight	Bob Sapp	def.	Akihito Tanaka	TKO (punches)	1	5:22	(Note: Produced by DJ OZMA featuring YUDETAMAGO.)
Welterweight	Andy Ologun	def.	Yukio Sakaguchi	KO (punches)	1	3:52
Featherweight	Daisuke Nakamura	def.	Hideo Tokoro	Submission (armbar)	1	2:23
Middleweight	Minowaman	def.	Errol Zimmerman	Submission (toe hold)	1	1:01
K-1 Rules
Heavyweight	Gegard Mousasi	def.	Musashi	TKO (referee stoppage)	1	2:32
Heavyweight	Alistair Overeem	def.	Badr Hari	KO (right hook)	1	2:07
Welterweight	Tatsuya Kawajiri	def.	Kozo Takeda	KO	1	2:37
Welterweight	Artur Kyshenko	def.	Yoshihiro Sato	majority decision, 2-0 (30-29, 29-28, 29-29)	3	5:00
K-1 Rules, K-1 KOSHIEN Under 18 Tournament – Final
	HIROYA	def.	Koya Urabe	extra round unanimous decision, 3-0	3	5:00
K-1 Rules, K-1 KOSHIEN Under 18 Tournament – Semi Final
	HIROYA	def.	Shota Shimada	three-round unanimous decision, 3-0 (30-29, 30-29, 30-29)	3	5:00
	Koya Urabe	def.	Ryuya Kusakabe	TKO (doctor stoppage)	3	2:29
K-1 Rules, K-1 KOSHIEN Under 18 Tournament – Reserve Fight
	Taishi Hiratsuka	def.	Daizo Sasaki	KO	2	1:00

=== Canceled fights ===
- An MMA bout between Mark Hunt and Jerome Le Banner was originally scheduled, but Le Banner had to withdraw a few days before the event. Melvin Manhoef was instead brought in to replace him.
- Joachim Hansen was scheduled to fight JZ Calvancante, but the bout was canceled the day of the event due to Hansen sustaining a head injury training and not passing pre-fight medicals.

== Broadcast ==
In Japan, parts of the event were shown live on TBS (Tokyo Broadcasting Station) in a four an hour timeslot and the full event on a delayed pay-per-view. Unlike the previous year's event, Dynamite!! did not have North American clearance in 2008.

== Press conference ==
On October 18, 2008, FEG held a press conference to promote the event. Although no matchups were announced several fighters were in attendance, and FEG stated more participants would be announced at a later date. The fighters in attendance were Joachim Hansen, Hayato Sakurai, Kazushi Sakuraba, Yuichi Nakanishi, Musashi, Shinya Aoki, Tatsuya Kawajiri, Mitsuhiro Ishida, Masakazu Imanari, Atsushi Yamamoto, Takeshi Yamazaki, Ikuhisa Minowa, Seichi Ikemoto, Kiyoshi Tamura, Yoshihiro Sato, Yasuhiro Kido, Mirko Cro Cop, and Kuniyoshi Hironaka.

== See also ==
- Dream (mixed martial arts)
- List of Dream champions
- 2008 in DREAM
