= Hideaki Yamazaki =

Japanese kickboxer (born 1987)

- Born: 山崎 秀晃; February 5, 1987 (age 39); Kyoto, Japan
- Other names: Golden Fist
- Height: 177 cm (5 ft 10 in)
- Weight: 65.0 kg (143.3 lb; 10.24 st)
- Division: Featherweight
- Style: Shotokan Karate, kickboxing
- Stance: Orthodox
- Fighting out of: Tokyo, Japan
- Team: Team Dragon / KREST
- Rank: Black belt in Shotokan Karate
- Years active: 2009 - present

Kickboxing record
- Total: 46
- Wins: 35
- By knockout: 20
- Losses: 10
- By knockout: 4
- Draws: 1

Other information
- Website: h-yamazaki.com

Hideaki Yamazaki (山崎 秀晃, born February 5, 1987) is a Japanese Shotokan kickboxer, currently competing in the super lightweight division of K-1. A professional competitor since 2009, Yamazaki is the former Krush Lightweight and Krush Super Lightweight champion, as well as the former K-1 Super Lightweight champion. He also won the Krush -63 kg WILDRUSH League in 2012.

As of February 2021, he is the #3 ranked featherweight according to Combat Press. He's been ranked as a top ten featherweight since October 2020. He was previously ranked in the featherweight top ten by Combat Press between April 2016 and May 2018. He was ranked in the featherweight top ten by LiverKick.com.

== Kickboxing career ==
=== Lightweight ===
==== Early career ====
Yamazaki made his professional debut against Yuichiro Kono at J-NETWORK J-FIGHT 27. He won the fight by unanimous decision. He went on to win six of his next seven fights, drawing once against Shuhei Morikawa. He suffered his first professional loss to TaCa at Krush-EX 2011 vol.2, losing by TKO in the third round.

Yamazaki rebounded by winning his next eight fights, including a trilogy with Taca. The winning streak ended when he was scheduled to fight Gagny Baradji at Krush 25, with Baradji knocking Yamazaki out with a right hook in the second round.

==== Krush Lightweight title reign ====
His stellar streak earned him the chance to fight Thomas Adamandopoulos for the Krush Lightweight title at Krush 27 on March 20, 2013. He won the fight by unanimous decision. After defeating Ikki and Luke Turner, he was scheduled to fight Minoru Kimura in his first title defense. Yamazaki knocked Kimura out after just 47 seconds, with an overhand right. After winning another non-title bout against Mohamed Galaoui by technical knockout, he was scheduled to defend his title for the second time against Mohamed Boulef at Krush 42 on June 12, 2014. Yamazaki won the fight by a second-round technical knockout.

In November 2014, Hideaki Yamazaki made his highly anticipated debut with K-1, fighting in the quarter finals of the K-1 World GP 2014 -65kg Championship Tournament. He lost a unanimous decision against the future champion Kaew Fairtex.

Returning to Krush, he was booked to face Joan Manuel Lique Cañaveral, in his third title defense, at Krush 55 on June 12, 2015. He defeated Cañaveral by unanimous decision. He was then scheduled to fight Masaaki Noiri at Krush 57 in a non-title fight. The fight went into an extra round, after which Noiri won a decision. It was Yamazaki's first loss in Krush in nearly three years.

=== Super lightweight ===
==== Krush Super Lightweight title reign ====
Abandoning his Lightweight title, Yamazaki went up in weight to fight NOMAN for the Krush Super Lightweight title. The title bout took place at Krush 60 on November 14, 2015. He won the fight by technical knockout in the second round, after the referee was forced to wave the fight off following an undefended flurry of punches from Yamazaki.

Yamazaki was then booked to take part in the 2016 K-1 Japan Super Lightweight Grand Prix. In the quarterfinal, Yamazaki beat Yasuomi Soda by an uppercut knockout in the second round. Advancing to the semifinals, he defeated Yuta Kubo by a third-round technical knockout, after he had dropped him twice in the round. This resulted in a stoppage victory for Yamazaki, under the K-1 tournament rules. In the tournament final, he fought a rematch with Masaaki Noiri, whom he defeated by majority decision.

Yamazaki took part in the 2016 K-1 World Super Lightweight Grand Prix as well. Despite a successful start to the one-day tournament, which saw him win a unanimous decision against Stanislav Reniţă, he lost a split decision to Ilias Bulaid in the penultimate bout of the Grand Prix.

Yamazaki next faced Gonnapar Weerasakreck at K-1 World GP 2016 -60kg World Tournament on September 19, 2016. He lost the fight by unanimous decision. Despite suffering back-to-back losses, Yamazaki was given a chance to fight Kaew Fairtex for the K-1 Super Lightweight title at K-1 World GP 2017 Super Bantamweight Championship Tournament on April 22, 2017. Kaew won the fight by unanimous decision.

After his failed title shot, Yamazaki fought and beat Jun Nakazawa in June 2018, winning by unanimous decision. He lost his next fight against Rukiya Anpo, after the fight went into an extra round, during which Anpo knocked Yamazaki out with a head kick. After this loss, he went on a four fight winning streak, defeating Jin Hirayama by decision and knocking out Ruku, Tsubasa Horii and Hikaru Terashima.

==== K-1 Super Lightweight champion ====
During the 2020 K-1 World GP in Osaka, held on September 22, 2020, Yamazaki fought Rukiya Anpo for the K-1 Super Lightweight title. He won the fight by a first-round left hook knockout.

Yamazaki was booked to fight Fukashi Mizutani in a non-title bout at K-1: K’Festa 4 on March 21, 2021. He beat Fukashi by knockout, 70 seconds into the fight.

Yamazaki made his first K-1 super lightweight title defense against Tetsuya Yamato at K-1: K'Festa 5 on April 3, 2022. Yamazaki lost his title by first round knockout when Yamato landed a left hook only 50 seconds into the bout.

==== Later super lightweight career ====
Yamazaki faced the 2019 RISE Lightweight champion Kento Haraguchi at The Match 2022 on June 19, 2022. He lost the fight by a second-round technical knockout, after suffering two knockdowns in the opening round.

== Titles and accomplishments ==
=== Kickboxing ===
- K-1
  - 2016 K-1 World GP 2016 -65kg Japan Tournament winner
  - 2020 K-1 Super Lightweight Championship
- Krush
  - 2009 GAORA Krush Lightweight WILDRUSH League winner
  - 2013 Krush Lightweight Championship
    - Three successful title defenses
  - 2015 Krush Super Lightweight Championship
- Amateur
  - 2006 JAPAN GAME Tournament
  - 2006 1st Dragon Cup Tournament winner -64 kg

Awards

- 2018 K-1 Awards Fight of the Year (vs Rukiya Anpo)
- 2020 K-1 Awards Fight of the Year (vs Rukiya Anpo)
- 4x eFight "Fighter of the Month" (March 2013, June 2014 and March 2016, September 2020)

=== Karate ===
- Tsukishinkai
  - 2006 Tsukishinkai 8th Osaka Karate Tournament winner
- Shin Karate
  - 2008 Shin Karate 102nd K-2 Lightweight Tournament winner
  - 2009 Shin Karate 104th K-2 Lightweight Tournament winner
  - 2009 Shin Karate 20th All Japan Championship Lightweight 3rd place

== Kickboxing record ==
Kickboxing record
35 wins (20 (T)KOs), 10 losses, 1 draw
Date	Result	Opponent	Event	Location	Method	Round	Time
2026-06-07	Win	(Japan) Ayuto Kaneeda	KNUCKLE'S 17	Kumamoto, Japan	KO		
2022-06-19	Loss	(Japan) Kento Haraguchi	THE MATCH 2022	Tokyo, Japan	TKO (ref. stoppage/punches)	2	0:33
2022-04-03	Loss	(Japan) Tetsuya Yamato	K-1: K'Festa 5	Tokyo, Japan	KO (left hook)	1	0:50
Loses the K-1 Super Lightweight Championship.
2021-03-21	Win	(Japan) Fukashi Mizutani	K-1: K'Festa 4 Day 1	Tokyo, Japan	KO (left jab)	1	1:10
2020-09-22	Win	(Japan) Rukiya Anpo	K-1 World GP 2020 in Osaka	Osaka, Japan	KO (left hook)	1	1:18
Wins the K-1 Super Lightweight Championship.
2020-03-22	Win	(Japan) Hikaru Terashima	K-1: K’Festa 3	Saitama, Japan	KO (punches)	2	2:59
2020-01-25	Win	(Japan) Tsubasa Horii	Krush 110	Tokyo, Japan	KO (3 knockdowns)	1	2:28
2019-11-24	Win	(Japan) Ruku	K-1 World GP 2019 Yokohamatsuri	Yokohama, Japan	KO (3 knockdowns)	1	1:24
2019-08-24	Win	(Japan) Jin Hirayama	K-1 World GP 2019: Japan vs World 5 vs 5 & Special Superfight in Osaka	Osaka, Japan	Decision (unanimous)	3	3:00
2018-12-08	Loss	(Japan) Rukiya Anpo	K-1 World GP 2018: K-1 Lightweight World's Strongest Tournament	Osaka, Japan	Ext.R TKO (high kick)	4	0:13
2018-06-17	Win	(Japan) Jun Nakazawa	K-1 World GP 2018: 2nd Featherweight Championship Tournament	Saitama, Japan	Decision (unanimous)	3	3:00
2017-04-22	Loss	(Thailand) Kaew Fairtex	K-1 World GP 2017 Super Bantamweight Championship Tournament	Tokyo, Japan	Decision (unanimous)	3	3:00
For the K-1 -65kg Championship.
2016-09-19	Loss	(Thailand) Kongnapa Weerasakreck	K-1 World GP 2016 -60kg World Tournament	Tokyo, Japan	Decision (unanimous)	3	3:00
2016-06-24	Loss	(Morocco) Ilias Bulaid	K-1 World GP 2016 -65kg World Tournament, Semi Finals	Tokyo, Japan	Ext.R decision (split)	4	3:00
2016-06-24	Win	(Moldova) Stanislav Reniţă	K-1 World GP 2016 -65kg World Tournament, Quarter Finals	Tokyo, Japan	Decision (unanimous)	3	3:00
2016-03-04	Win	(Japan) Masaaki Noiri	K-1 World GP 2016 -65kg Japan Tournament, Final	Tokyo, Japan	Decision (majority)	3	3:00
Won K-1 World GP 2016 -65kg Japan Tournament.
2016-03-04	Win	(Japan) Yuta Kubo	K-1 World GP 2016 -65kg Japan Tournament, Semi Finals	Tokyo, Japan	KO (2 knockdowns)	3	2:57
2016-03-04	Win	(Japan) Yasuomi Soda	K-1 World GP 2016 -65kg Japan Tournament, Quarter Finals	Tokyo, Japan	KO (uppercut + left hook)	2	0:32
2015-11-14	Win	(Japan) NOMAN	Krush 60	Japan	TKO (referee stoppage)	2	0:54
Won Krush -65kg Title.
2015-08-22	Loss	(Japan) Masaaki Noiri	Krush 57 in NAGOYA	Nagoya, Japan	Ext.R decision (unanimous)	4	3:00
2015-06-12	Win	(Colombia) Joan Manuel Lique Cañaveral	Krush 55	Japan	Decision (unanimous)	3	3:00
Defended the Krush Lightweight Title.
2014-11-03	Loss	(Thailand) Kaew Fairtex	K-1 World GP 2014 -65kg Championship Tournament, Quarter Finals	Shibuya, Tokyo, Japan	Decision (unanimous)	3	3:00
2014-06-12	Win	(Morocco) Mohamed Boulef	Krush 42	Japan	TKO (left hooks)	3	2:00
Defended the Krush Lightweight Title.
2014-02-14	Win	(Tunisia) Mohamed Galaoui	Krush.38	Japan	KO (left hooks)	2	2:20
2013-12-14	Win	(Brazil) Minoru Kimura	Krush.35	Tokyo, Japan	KO (overhand right)	1	0:47
Defended the Krush Lightweight Title.
2013-09-21	Win	(United Kingdom) Luke Turner	Krush.33	Tokyo, Japan	KO (right hook)	1	1:28
2013-06-16	Win	(Japan) Ikki	Krush.29	Tokyo, Japan	Decision (unanimous)	3	3:00
2013-03-20	Win	(France) Thomas Adamandopoulos	Krush.27	Tokyo, Japan	Decision (unanimous)	3	3:00
Won the Krush Lightweight title.
2012-12-14	Loss	(France) Gagny Baradji	Krush.25 TEAM DRAGON 10th Anniversary	Japan	KO (right hook)	2	0:58
2012-10-08	Win	(Japan) Takahashi Yukimitsu	Krush.23	Tokyo, Japan	Decision (majority)	3	3:00
Won the GAORA Krush Lightweight WILDRUSH League title.
2012-07-21	Win	(Japan) Terasaki Naoki	Krush.20	Tokyo, Japan	KO (left hook)	1	0:24
2012-03-17	Win	(Japan) Taca	Krush.17	Tokyo, Japan	Decision (unanimous)	3	3:00
2012-01-09	Win	(Japan) Tsukakoshi Hitoshi	Krush.15	Tokyo, Japan	Decision (unanimous)	3	3:00
2011-11-12	Win	(Japan) Hayato Hatakeyama	Krush.13	Tokyo, Japan	KO (right hook)	1	2:59
2011-09-24	Win	(China) Chen Minmin	Krush.12 Krush vs China "The Legend of Heroes"	Tokyo, Japan	KO (right knee)	2	0:56
2011-07-16	Win	(Japan) NOMAN	Krush-70 kg Founder Championship Tournament	Tokyo, Japan	Decision (unanimous)	3	3:00
2011-04-30	Win	(Japan) Yuki Yamamoto	Krush founder championship tournament	Tokyo, Japan	KO (right hook)	1	1:11
2011-02-13	Loss	(Japan) TaCa	Krush-EX 2011 vol.2	Japan	TKO (towel throw)	3	1:29
2010-10-31	Win	(Japan) TaCa	Krush-EX Road to the Championship	Japan	KO (3 knockdowns)	1	2:59
2010-09-20	Win	(Japan) Osamu Maeda	Krush.10	Japan	KO (straight right)	1	0:41
2010-07-09	Win	(Japan) Daisuke Endo	Krush.8	Japan	Decision (unanimous)	3	3:00
2010-05-27	Win	(Japan) Isao Takahashi	Krush.7	Japan	KO (right high kick)	1	1:29
2010-03-13	Win	(Japan) Tsukasa Fuji	Krush×Survivor	Japan	Decision (unanimous)	3	3:00
2009-12-04	Draw	(Japan) Shuhei Morikawa	Krush-EX Shinjuku Dog Fight	Japan	Decision	3	3:00
2009-09-13	Win	(Japan) Janjira Katsu	J-NETWORK J-FIGHT 30	Japan	Decision (unanimous)	3	3:00
2009-06-14	Win	(Japan) Yuichiro Kono	J-NETWORK J-FIGHT 27	Japan	Decision (unanimous)	3	3:00
Legend: Win Loss Draw/no contest Notes

== See also ==
- List of male kickboxers
