= 2011 in K-1 =

Mixed martial arts events

Information
- First date: June 25
- Last date: December 31

Events
- Total events: 3

Fights

Chronology
2010 in K-1	2011 in K-1	2012 in K-1

This is a list of events held in 2011 by K-1, a kickboxing promotion based in Japan.

== List of events ==
#	Event title	Date	Arena	Location
1	K-1 World MAX 2011 –63 kg Japan Tournament Final	June 25, 2011	Yoyogi National Gymnasium	Tokyo, Japan
2	K-1 World MAX 2011 –70 kg Japan Tournament Final	September 25, 2011	Osaka Prefectural Gymnasium	Osaka, Japan

== K-1 World MAX 2011 –63 kg Japan Tournament Final ==
K-1 World MAX 2011 –63 kg Japan Tournament Final
- Promotion: K-1
- Date: June 25, 2011
- Venue: Yoyogi National Gymnasium
- City: Tokyo, Japan
- Attendance: 3,195

K-1 World MAX 2011 –63 kg Japan Tournament Final was a kickboxing event held on June 25, 2011, at the Yoyogi National Gymnasium in Tokyo, Japan.

=== K-1 World MAX 2011 –63 kg Japan Tournament bracket ===
Quarter-finals
(Japan) Tetsuya Yamato	DEC
(Japan) Hiroya	3-0
(Japan) Koya Urabe	DEC
(Japan) Yuki	2-0
(Japan) Yuta Kubo	DEC
(Japan) Kizaemon Saiga	2-0
(Japan) Masaaki Noiri	DEC
(Japan) Ryuji Kajiwara	EX.

Semi-finals
(Japan) Koya Urabe	DEC
(Japan) Tetsuya Yamato	3-0
(Japan) Yuta Kubo	DEC
(Japan) Masaaki Noiri	3-0

Final
(Japan) Yuta Kubo	DEC
(Japan) Koya Urabe	3-0

=== Results ===
Main Card
Weight Class				Method	Round	Time	Notes
63 kg	(Japan) Yuta Kubo	def.	(Japan) Koya Urabe	Decision (Unanimous)	3	3:00	-63 kg Tournament Final
70 kg	(Japan) Yoshihiro Sato	def.	(Netherlands) Albert Kraus	Decision (Majority)	3	3:00
63 kg	(Japan) Yuta Kubo	def.	(Japan) Masaaki Noiri	Decision (Unanimous)	3	3:00	-63 kg Tournament Semi Final
63 kg	(Japan) Koya Urabe	def.	(Japan) Tetsuya Yamato	Decision (Unanimous)	3	3:00	-63 kg Tournament Semi Final
63 kg	(Japan) Masaaki Noiri	def.	(Japan) Ryuji Kajiwara	Ext.R Decision (Split)	4	3:00	-63 kg Tournament Quarter Final
63 kg	(Japan) Yuta Kubo	def.	(Japan) Kiazemon Saiga	Decision (Majority)	3	3:00	-63 kg Tournament Quarter Final
63 kg	(Japan) Koya Urabe	def.	(Japan) Yuki	Decision (Majority)	3	3:00	-63 kg Tournament Quarter Final
63 kg	(Japan) Tetsuya Yamato	def.	(Japan) Hiroya	Decision (unanimous)	3	3:00	-63 kg Tournament Quarter Final
63 kg	(Japan) Koji Yoshimoto	def.	(Japan) Shohei Asahara	Ext.R Decision (unanimous)	4	3:00	-63 kg Tournament Reserve Fight 2
63 kg	(Japan) Toshiki Taniyama	def.	(Japan) Yuto Watanabe	Ext.R Decision (unanimous)	4	3:00	-63 kg Tournament Reserve Fight 1
Preliminary Card
63 kg	(Japan) Yasuomi Soda	def.	(Japan) Shingo Yokoyama	Decision (Unanimous)	3	3:00
63 kg	(Japan) Akihiro Kimura	def.	(Japan) Yuji Tanaka	KO (Right cross)	1	1:51
63 kg	(Japan) Takayoshi Kitayama	def.	(Japan) Gentaro	Decision (unanimous)	3	3:00
70 kg	(Japan) KOjiman	def.	(Japan) Hideto Fujii	KO (Left hook)	1	0:35

== K-1 World MAX 2011 –70 kg Japan Tournament Final ==
K-1 World MAX 2011 –70 kg Japan Tournament Final
- Promotion: K-1
- Date: September 25, 2011
- Venue: Osaka Prefectural Gymnasium
- City: Osaka, Japan
- Attendance: 5,410

K-1 World MAX 2011 –70 kg Japan Tournament Final was a kickboxing event held on September 25, 2011, at the Osaka Prefectural Gymnasium in Osaka, Japan.

=== K-1 World MAX 2011 –70 kg Japan Tournament bracket ===
Quarter-finals
(Japan) Yuji Nashiro	DEC
(Netherlands) Albert Kraus	3-0
(Japan) Takafumi Morita	DEC
(Japan) Hiroki Nakajima	3-0
(Japan) Yuya Yamamoto	DEC
(Japan) Shintaro Matsukura	3-0
(Japan) Kenta	DEC
(Japan) Yasuhiro Kido	2-0

Semi-finals
(Japan) Yuji Nashiro	DEC
(Japan) Takafumi Morita	3-0
(Japan) Yuya Yamamoto	EX
(Japan) Kenta	3-0

Final
(Japan) Yuji Nashiro	KO
(Japan) Yuya Yamamoto	1

=== Results ===
Main Card
Weight Class				Method	Round	Time	Notes
70 kg	(Japan) Yuji Nashiro	def.	(Japan) Yuya Yamamoto	KO (Punches)	1	3:00	70 kg Tournament Final
63 kg	(Japan) Yuta Kubo	def.	(Germany) Andre Bruhl	Decision (Unanimous)	3	3:00
63 kg	(Japan) Kizaemon Saiga	def.	(Albania) Valdrin Vatnikaj	Decision (Unanimous)	3	3:00
70 kg	(Japan) Yuya Yamamoto	def.	(Japan) Kenta	Ext.R Decision (Unanimous)	4	3:00	70 kg Tournament Semi Final
70 kg	(Japan) Yuji Nashiro	def.	(Japan) Takafumi Morita	Decision (Unanimous)	3	3:00	70 kg Tournament Semi Final
78 kg	(Japan) Yuichiro Nagashima	def.	(Japan) Ken Moon	Decision (Unanimous)	3	3:00
70 kg	(Japan) Kenta	def.	(Japan) Yasuhiro Kido	Decision (Majority)	3	3:00	70 kg Tournament Quarter Final
70 kg	(Japan) Yuya Yamamoto	def.	(Japan) Shintaro Matsukura	Decision (Unanimous)	3	3:00	70 kg Tournament Quarter Final
70 kg	(Japan) Takafumi Morita	def.	(Japan) Hiroki Nakajima	Decision (Unanimous)	3	3:00	70 kg Tournament Quarter Final
70 kg	(Japan) Yuji Nashiro	def.	(Netherlands) Albert Kraus	Decision (Unanimous)	3	3:00	70 kg Tournament Quarter Final
70 kg	(Japan) Go Yokoyama	def.	(Japan) YOSHI	Decision (Unanimous)	3	3:00	70 kg Tournament Reserve fight
Preliminary Card
63 kg	(Japan) Naoki	def.	(Japan) Takayoshi Kitayama	TKO (3 Knockdowns)	3	0:04
63 kg	(Japan) Yuya	def.	(Japan) Akihiro Kimura	KO (Punches)	3	2:02
63 kg	(Japan) Yuya Kai	def.	(Japan) Taito	KO (Left hook)	2	2:40

== See also ==
- List of K-1 events
- List of K-1 champions
- List of male kickboxers
