= Yoshihiro Sato =

Japanese kickboxer (born 1981)

- Born: Sato Yoshihiro; January 25, 1981 (age 45); Nagoya, Aichi, Japan
- Native name: 佐藤 嘉洋
- Other names: Mugen Sniper; Yoshi-HERO
- Nationality: Japanese
- Height: 1.86 m (6 ft 1 in)
- Weight: 73 kg (161 lb; 11.5 st)
- Division: Welterweight; Middleweight
- Reach: 78.7 in (200 cm)
- Style: Muay Thai (Muay Mat)
- Stance: Orthodox
- Fighting out of: Tokyo, Japan
- Team: FULLCAST; Nagoya JK Factory
- Years active: 1998–present

Kickboxing record
- Total: 78
- Wins: 54
- By knockout: 20
- Losses: 23
- By knockout: 4
- Draws: 1

Other information
- University: Meijo University
- Last updated on: March 23, 2014

Yoshihiro Sato (佐藤 嘉洋, Satō Yoshihiro; born January 25, 1981) is a Japanese kickboxer competing in K-1 at middleweight (−70 kg). He is the former world champion of Muay Thai in WKA and WPKC, and he won the Japanese national tournament of K-1 twice in 2006 and 2007. His official nickname is "Mugen Sniper" which means Infinite Sniper.

== Biography ==
=== Amateur era ===
Born in Nagoya, Aichi, Japan on January 25, 1981, Sato began training in kickboxing in 1994 when he was in his second year of junior high school. Originally, Sato had been going to visit a boxing gym with his friend, but he argued and fought just before visiting. Sato was defeated completely in the fight. For this incident, he visited "Nagoya JK Factory", a kickboxing gym near to Sato's house, and started learning kickboxing. He won the Glove Karate Open Championship Tournament when he was just 16 years old, still in his second year of high school. He also won the championship the next year in 1997.

=== Fight as a professional kickboxer ===
He passed the examination for professional kickboxing of New Japan Kickboxing Federation (NJKF) in 1998. He won his first match against Isao Miyamoto by decision on December 25, 1998. He changed his weight class from lightweight to welterweight in April 2000. He moved to All Japan Kickboxing Federation from NJKF in June 2001. He won the title of WKA World Muay Thai Welterweight by KO Milan Stevic in Germany on 23 November 2001. It was the first time for him to fight in the oversea.

=== Entry to K-1 ===
In his K-1 debut on May 3, 2005, he beat William Diender by decision. He lost to Virgil Kalakoda in a K-1 Superfight in the K-1 MAX Finals. On October 12, 2005, he defeated Kaoklai Kaennorsing, the only fighter who has fought in both K-1's heavyweight division and in K-1 MAX. On February 4, 2006 he defeated Akeomi Nitta, Ryuki Ueyama and Tatsuji to win the K-1 MAX Japan Grand Prix 2006 tournament. On February 5, 2007 he won the K-1 MAX Japan Grand Prix 2007 tournament. In April 2007 he lost to Dutch fighter Andy Souwer by decision. His latest fight was on July 7, 2008 in which he defeated Buakaw Por. Pramuk by KO in the 3rd round in the Quarterfinals for the K-1 MAX Finals and he is set to fight Masato on October 10, 2008.

On February 17, 2012, Sato defeated Fadi Merza via unanimous decision after 5th round to take the Merza's ISKA World Light Middleweight (-72.3 kg) Championship under Oriental rules in Tokyo, Japan.

He was scheduled to face Dzhabar Askerov in a tournament reserve bout at Glory 3: Rome - 2012 Middleweight Slam Final 8 to be held on November 3, 2012 in Rome, Italy. However, when quarter finalist Albert Kraus came down with the flu, Sato was given his place in the tournament proper. He was TKO'd by Sanny Dahlbeck.

In an upset, Sato lost a unanimous decision to Kenta in the co-main event of Krush.26 in Tokyo on January 28, 2013.

He broke a three-fight losing streak when he took a majority decision win over Henri van Opstal at Shootboxing 2013 - Act 1 in Tokyo on February 22, 2013.

Sato defeated Lee Sun-Hyun via unanimous decision at Glory 8: Tokyo - 2013 65kg Slam in Tokyo on May 3, 2013.

He beat Yuichiro Nagashima by unanimous decision at Hoost Cup: Kings in Nagoya, Japan on June 16, 2013.

Sato beat Shintaro Matsukura by unanimous decision at Krush.32 in Nagoya on September 1, 2013.

In their fourth meeting, Sato lost to Buakaw Banchamek on points at MAX Muay Thai 4 in Sendai, Japan on October 6, 2013.

He lost to Dzhabar Askerov by unanimous decision at Tech-Krep FC: Southern Front 2 in Kyiv, Ukraine on December 8, 2013.

Sato lost via unanimous decision to Petchmankong Gaiyanghaadao at Hoost Cup: Legend in Nagoya, Japan on March 23, 2014.

== Titles ==
=== Amateur ===
- All Japan Glove Karate Federation
  - 1996 Glove Karate Open championship winner
  - 1997 Glove Karate Open championship winner

=== Professional ===
- World Kickboxing Association
  - WKA Muay Thai World Welterweight champion (Defence: 1)
- World Professional Kickboxing Council
  - WPKC Muay Thai World Super welterweight champion (Defence: 1)
- K-1
  - K-1 World MAX 2006 Japan Tournament winner
  - K-1 World MAX 2007 Japan Tournament winner
  - K-1 World MAX 2010 runner up
- International Sport Karate Association
  - ISKA World Light Middleweight (-72.3 kg) Championship
- All Japan Kickboxing Federation
  - 2004 AJFK Skill Award
- New Japan Kickboxing Federation
  - 1999 The Rookie of the Year (NJKF)

== Fight record ==
Professional Kickboxing record
54 Wins (20 (T)KO's, 32 decisions), 25 Losses, 1 Draws
Date	Result	Opponent	Event	Location	Method	Round	Time	Record
2015-05-04	Loss	(Netherlands) Jordann Pikeur	Krush 54	Tokyo, Japan	KO	2		54-25-1
2015-01-18	Loss	(Sweden) Sanny Dahlbeck	K-1 World GP 2015 -60kg Championship Tournament	Tokyo, Japan	KO	4	2:08	54-24-1
2014-08-24	Win	(Japan) Yoichi Yamazaki	Krush.45	Nagoya, Japan	Decision (unanimous)	3	3:00	54-23-1
2014-05-17	Draw	(China) Xu Yan	Hero Legends	Shenzhen, China	Decision	3	3:00	53-23-1
For the HERO Legends World Kickboxing (72kg) Title.
2014-03-23	Loss	(Thailand) Petchmankong Gaiyanghaadao	Hoost Cup: Legend	Nagoya, Japan	Decision (unanimous)	3	3:00	53-23
2013-12-08	Loss	(Russia) Dzhabar Askerov	Tech-Krep FC: Southern Front 2	Kyiv, Ukraine	Decision (unanimous)	3	3:00	53-22
2013-10-06	Loss	(Thailand) Buakaw Banchamek	MAX Muay Thai 4	Sendai, Japan	Decision	3	3:00	53-21
2013-09-01	Win	(Japan) Shintaro Matsukura	Krush.32	Nagoya, Japan	Decision (unanimous)	3	3:00	53-20
2013-06-16	Win	(Japan) Yuichiro Nagashima	Hoost Cup: Kings	Nagoya, Japan	Decision (unanimous)	3	3:00	52-20
2013-05-03	Win	(South Korea) Lee Sung-Hyun	Glory 8: Tokyo	Tokyo, Japan	Decision (unanimous)	3	3:00	51-20
2013-02-22	Win	(Netherlands) Henri van Opstal	Shootboxing 2013 - Act 1	Tokyo, Japan	Decision (majority)	3	3:00	50-20
2013-01-28	Loss	(Japan) Kenta	Krush.26	Tokyo, Japan	Decision (unanimous)	3	3:00	49-20
2012-10-02	Loss	(Sweden) Sanny Dahlbeck	Glory 3: Rome - 70 kg Slam Tournament, Quarter Finals	Rome, Italy	TKO (knee to the body)	2		49-19
2012-05-26	Loss	(Albania) Shemsi Beqiri	Glory 1: Stockholm - 70 kg Slam Tournament, First Round	Stockholm, Sweden	Decision (Unanimous)	3	3.00	49-18
2012-02-17	Win	(Austria) Fadi Merza	Krush.16	Tokyo, Japan	Decision (Unanimous)	5	3:00	49-17
Wins Merza's ISKA Oriental World Light Middleweight (-159lbs/-72.3kg) Championship.
2011-11-27	Loss	(Sweden) Alex Tobiasson Harris	Rumble of the Kings 2011	Stockholm, Sweden	Decision (Unanimous)	3	3:00	48-17
2011-06-25	Win	(Netherlands) Albert Kraus	K-1 World MAX 2011 –63 kg Japan Tournament Final, Super fight	Tokyo, Japan	Decision (2-0)	3	3:00	48-16
2011-04-23	Loss	(Netherlands) Andy Souwer	Shootboxing 2011 Act 2	Tokyo, Japan	Decision (3-0)	3	3:00	47-16
2011-03-12	Loss	(Italy) Armen Petrosyan	Fight Code: Dragon Series Round 2	Milan, Italy	Decision (Unanimous)	3	3:00	47-15
2011-01-09	Win	(Albania) Shemsi Beqiri	Krush -63 kg The First Championship Tournament Round.2	Tokyo, Japan	Decision (Split)	3	3:00	47-14
2010-11-08	Loss	(Italy) Giorgio Petrosyan	K-1 World MAX 2010 Final, final	Tokyo, Japan	Decision (Unanimous)	3	3:00	46-14
Fight was for K-1 World MAX 2010 tournament title.
2010-11-08	Win	(Armenia) Gago Drago	K-1 World MAX 2010 Final, semi finals	Tokyo, Japan	Decision (Unanimous)	3	3:00	46-13
2010-11-08	Win	(Poland) Michał Głogowski	K-1 World MAX 2010 Final, quarter finals	Tokyo, Japan	Decision (Unanimous)	3	3:00	45-13
2010-08-14	Win	(Japan) Yuji Nashiro	Krush 9	Tokyo, Japan	Decision (Unanimous)	3	3:00	44-13
2010-07-05	Win	(Japan) Yuya Yamamoto	K-1 World MAX 2010 Final 16 - Part 1	Tokyo, Japan	Decision (Majority)	3	3:00	43-13
Qualifies for K-1 World MAX 2010 Final.
2010-05-29	Loss	(Thailand) Pajonsuk	It's Showtime 2010 Amsterdam	Amsterdam, Netherlands	Decision (0-5)	3	3:00	42-13
2010-05-16	Ex	(Japan) Kozo Takeda	SNKA "Final Takeda Kozo Retirement Event"	Bunkyo, Tokyo, Japan	No Decision	2	2:11	
2010-03-27	Win	(Brazil) Danilo Zanolini	K-1 World MAX 2010 –70 kg Japan Tournament	Saitama, Japan	KO (Right knee)	1	3:00	42-12
2009-12-23	Win	(Japan) Crazy Teru	Yamato gym 40th & Nagoya JKF 20th Anniversary Memorial Event	Nagoya, Aichi, Japan	KO (Left low kick)	3	1:30	41-12
2009-10-26	Win	(Japan) Yasuhiro Kido	K-1 World MAX 2009 Final	Yokohama, Japan	KO (Right hook)	2	2:23	40-12
2009-07-13	Win	(Netherlands) Joerie Mes	K-1 World MAX 2009 Final 8	Tokyo, Japan	Ext R. Decision (Split)	4	3:00	39-12
2009-04-21	Loss	(Armenia) Gago Drago	K-1 World MAX 2009 Final 16	Fukuoka, Japan	Ext R. Decision (Unanimous)	4	3:00	38-12
2009-02-23	Win	(Russia) Sergey Golyaev	K-1 World MAX 2009 Japan Tournament	Tokyo, Japan	KO (Right low kick)	2	1:18	38-11
2008-12-31	Loss	(Ukraine) Artur Kyshenko	Dynamite!! 2008	Saitama, Japan	Decision (Majority)	3	3:00	37-11
2008-10-01	Loss	(Japan) Masato	K-1 World MAX 2008 Final	Tokyo, Japan	Ext R. Decision (Unanimous)	4	3:00	37-10
2008-07-07	Win	(Thailand) Buakaw Por. Pramuk	K-1 World MAX 2008 Final 8	Tokyo, Japan	KO (Right hook)	3	1:50	37-9
2008-04-09	Win	(Turkey) Murat Direkci	K-1 World MAX 2008 Final 16	Tokyo, Japan	Decision (Unanimous)	3	3:00	36-9
2008-02-02	Loss	(Thailand) Buakaw Por. Pramuk	K-1 World MAX 2008 Japan Tournament	Tokyo, Japan	Ext R. Decision (Split)	4	3:00	35-9
2007-10-03	Loss	(Netherlands) Albert Kraus	K-1 World MAX 2007 World Championship Final	Tokyo, Japan	Decision (Unanimous)	3	3:00	35-8
2007-06-28	Win	(Germany) Denis Schneidmiller	K-1 World MAX 2007 World Tournament Final Elimination	Tokyo, Japan	Decision (Unanimous)	3	3:00	35-7
2007-04-04	Loss	(Netherlands) Andy Souwer	K-1 World MAX 2007 World Elite Showcase	Tokyo, Japan	Decision (Unanimous)	3	3:00	34-7
2007-02-05	Win	(Japan) Tatsuji	K-1 World MAX 2007 Japan Tournament	Tokyo, Japan	KO (Right flying knee)	1	2:25	34-6
Wins K-1 MAX Japan Grand Prix 2007 tournament title.
2007-02-05	Win	(Japan) Keiji Ozaki	K-1 World MAX 2007 Japan Tournament	Tokyo, Japan	Decision (Unanimous)	3	3:00	33-6
2007-02-05	Win	(Japan) Yasuhito Shirasu	K-1 World MAX 2007 Japan Tournament	Tokyo, Japan	Decision (Unanimous)	3	3:00	32-6
2006-09-04	Loss	(Netherlands) Albert Kraus	K-1 World MAX 2006 Champions' Challenge	Tokyo, Japan	Decision (Majority)	3	3:00	31-6
2006-06-30	Loss	(Thailand) Buakaw Por.Pramuk	K-1 World MAX 2006 World Championship Final	Yokohama, Japan	KO (Left hook)	2	0:18	31-5
2006-04-05	Win	(Greece) Mike Zambidis	K-1 World MAX 2006 World Tournament Open	Tokyo, Japan	Decision (Unanimous)	3	3:00	31-4
2006-02-04	Win	(Japan) Tatsuji	K-1 World MAX 2006 Japan Tournament	Saitama, Japan	Decision (Unanimous)	3	3:00	30-4
Wins K-1 MAX Japan Grand Prix 2006 tournament title.
2006-02-04	Win	(Japan) Ryuki Ueyama	K-1 World MAX 2006 Japan Tournament	Saitama, Japan	TKO (Doctor Stoppage)	1	3:00	29-4
2006-02-04	Win	(Japan) Akeomi Nitta	K-1 World MAX 2006 Japan Tournament	Saitama, Japan	Decision (Unanimous)	3	3:00	28-4
2005-10-12	Win	(Thailand) Kaoklai Kaennorsing	K-1 World MAX 2005 Champions' Challenge	Tokyo, Japan	Decision (Majority)	3	3:00	27-4
2005-07-20	Loss	(South Africa) Virgil Kalakoda	K-1 World MAX 2005 Championship Final	Kanagawa, Japan	Decision (Majority)	3	3:00	26-4
2005-05-03	Win	(Netherlands) William Diender	K-1 World MAX 2005 World Tournament Open	Tokyo, Japan	Decision (Unanimous)	3	3:00	26-3
2005-02-06	Win	(Japan) Yuya Yamamoto	All Japan Kickboxing 2005: Moving	Japan	Decision (Unanimous)	5	3:00	25-3
2004-11-27	Win	(Thailand) Ittiphol Akkarivorn	Italy Gala	Italy	KO (Throw towel)	4		24-3
Retains WPKC Muay Thai World Super welterweight title.(1).
2004-09-25	Win	(Thailand) Dieselek Rungruangyon	Muaythailumpineekrikkri Fights, Lumpinee Stadium	Bangkok, Thailand	KO (Low kick)	1	1:15	23-3
2004-07-24	Win	(United Kingdom) Peter Crooke	All Japan Kickboxing 2004: Super Fighter Maximum	Japan	KO (Low kick)	3	1:33	22-3
2004-04-17	Loss	(Thailand) Changpeuk Chor Sriprasert	Muaythailumpineekrikkri Fights, Lumpinee Stadium	Bangkok, Thailand	TKO (Doctor stoppage)	4		21-3
For the inaugural WPMF World Super welterweight Championship.
2004-02-28	Win	(France) Asan Benfache	Kombat Festival 2004	Netherlands	Decision (Unanimous)	5	3:00	21-2
Wins WPKC World Muay Thai Super Welterweight title.
2003-12-06	Win	(Australia) Shane Chapman	SuperLeague Netherlands 2003	Rotterdam, Netherlands	TKO (Doc stop/cut shin)	2	3:00	20-2
2003-08-17	Win	(Thailand) Kaolan Kaovichit	All Japan Kickboxing 2003: Hurricane Blow	Japan	Decision (Unanimous)	5	3:00	19-2
Retain WKA World Muay Thai Welterweight title.
2003-06-20	Win	(Netherlands) Chris van Venrooij	All Japan Kickboxing 2003: Dead Heat	Japan	Decision (Unanimous)	5	3:00	18-2
2003-04-12	Win	(Thailand) Ittiphol Akkarivorn	Palasport Arcella	Netherlands	KO (Left hook)	2		17-2
2002-11-24	Loss	(Morocco) Fikri Tyarti	Victory or Hell	Amsterdam, Netherlands	Decision (Unanimous)	5	3:00	16-2
Fight was for WPKL World Muay Thai Welterweight title.
2002-10-17	Win	(Japan) Takahiko Shimizu	All Japan Kickboxing 2002: Brandnew Fight	Japan	Decision (Unanimous)	5	3:00	16-1
2002-07-21	Win	(Japan) Shingo Eguchi	All Japan Kickboxing 2002: Crush	Japan	TKO (Doctor stoppage/cut)	2	2:33	15-1
2002-04-12	Win	(Thailand) Charimsak Ingram Gym	All Japan Kickboxing 2002: Rising Force	Japan	Decision (Unanimous)	5	3:00	14-1
2002-02-15	Win	(Japan) Hisayuki Kanazawa	All Japan Kickboxing 2002: Vanguard	Japan	Decision (Unanimous)	5	3:00	13-1
2001-11-17	Win	(Serbia) Milan Stevic	Thai Kick Box Gala	Thailand	TKO (Throw towel)	4	1:41	12-1
Wins WKA World Muay Thai Welterweight title.
2001-08-10	Win	(Cape Verde) Noel Soares	All Japan Kickboxing 2001: Hot Shot	Japan	KO (Left knee)	3	2:22	11-1
2001-06-17	Win	(Japan) Tomohiro Chiba	All Japan Kickboxing 2001: Who's Next	Japan	KO	1	1:38	10-1
2001-03-20	Win	(Thailand) Khondej Shissen	NJKF "Challenge To Muay-Thai 4"	Japan	KO (Punch)	5	2:45	9-1
2001-02-12	Win	(Thailand) Choranthai Kiatchansin	NJKF "Challenge To Muay-Thai 2"	Thailand	Decision (Unanimous)	5	3:00	8-1
2000-11-26	Loss	(Thailand) Thanonsak Therrat	NJKF "Millennium Wars 10"	Thailand	TKO (3 knockdown/Left hook)	1	2:00	7-1
2000-09-24	Win	(Japan) Atsushi Nakamura	NJKF "Millennium Wars 8"	Japan	KO (Knee)	4	1:46	7-0
2000-07-07	Win	(Japan) Yasuyuki Hirokawa	NJKF "Millennium Wars 5"	Japan	KO (Knee)	5	0:23	6-0
Raised from 3 rounds to 5 rounds bout.
2000-04-09	Win	(Japan) Ryuji Hatsuda	NJKF "Yokohama Young Fight"	Yokohama, Japan	Decision (Unanimous)	3	3:00	5-0
Shifted his weight division from Lightweight to Welterweight(-66.68kg).
2000-01-29	Win	(Japan) Tatsuya Morimoto	NJKF "Millennium Wars 1"	Japan	Decision (Unanimous)	5	3:00	4-0
1999-08-29	Win	(Japan) Takenori Kato	NJKF	Japan	KO	2		3-0
1999-06-04	Win	(Japan) Masato Okawa	NJKF	Japan	Decision (Majority)	3	3:00	2-0
1998-12-25	Win	(Japan) Isao Miyamoto	NJKF	Japan	Decision (Majority)	3	3:00	1-0
Debuted as a professional kickboxer in NJKF at Lightweight(-61.23kg).
Legend: Win Loss Draw/No contest Notes

== See also ==
- List of K-1 events
- List of male kickboxers
