= Tetsuya Yamato =

Japanese Lightweight kickboxer (born 1987)

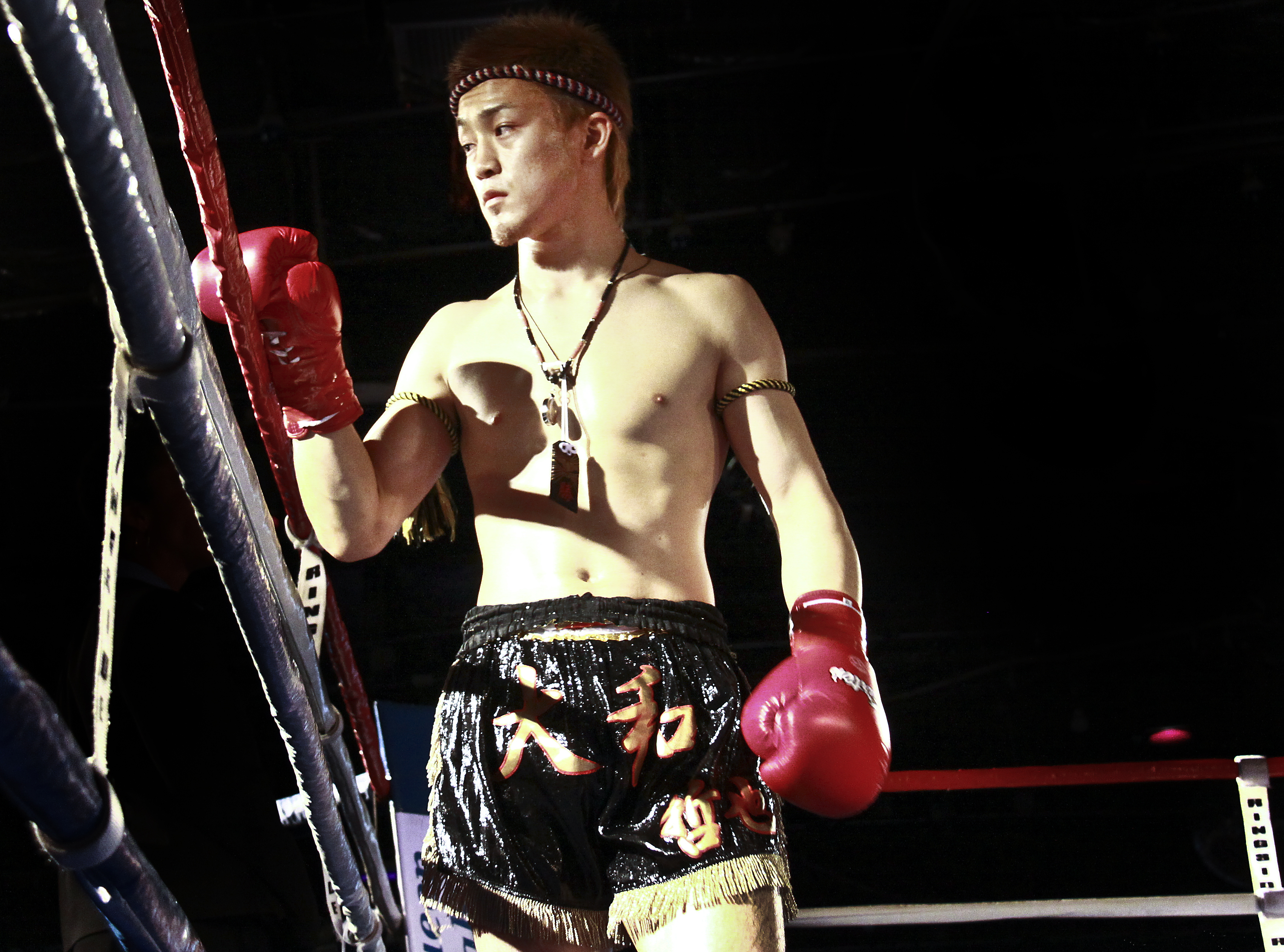
- Born: Tetsuya Iwashita 岩下 哲也; December 10, 1987 (age 38); Chita, Aichi, Japan
- Native name: 大和 哲也
- Other names: Strong-Armed Painter, The Japanese Battleship
- Nationality: Japanese
- Height: 1.71 m (5 ft 7 1/2 in)
- Weight: 63 kg (139 lb; 9.9 st)
- Division: Lightweight
- Style: Muay Thai, Kickboxing
- Stance: Orthodox
- Fighting out of: Nagoya, Aichi, Japan
- Team: Yamato Kickboxing Gym
- Years active: 2005 -present

Kickboxing record
- Total: 67
- Wins: 44
- By knockout: 30
- Losses: 22
- By knockout: 7
- Draws: 1

Other information
- Occupation: House painter and decorator
- Website: http://www.tetsuya-yamato.com/
- Last updated on: March 3, 2015

Tetsuya Iwashita (大和 哲也, Iwashita Tetsuya; born December 10, 1987), better known by his ring name Tetsuya Yamato, is a Japanese Muay thai fighter and kickboxer. He is the former K-1 Super Lightweight champion, the former WBC Muaythai and Lion Fight super lightweight champion, the former NJKF lightweight champion, as well as the K-1 WORLD MAX 2010 Lightweight Japan Tournament winner.

As of January 2023, he is ranked as the fourth best featherweight (-66 kg) kickboxer in the world by Combat Press and the eighth best super featherweight (-67.5 kg) by Beyond Kick. Combat Press has ranked him as a top ten featherweight since April 2022 and previously ranked him in the featherweight top ten between July and October 2015.

== Background ==
Yamato was born in Chita, Aichi, Japan on December 10, 1987, as Tetsuya Iwashita. He took the name Yamato in honour of his gym, Yamato Kickboxing Gym. After graduating from high school he started working in construction, and became a painter to coat buildings with coloured acrylic resin.

== Kickboxing career ==
=== Early career ===
On July 31, 2005, he made his debut as a professional kickboxer in the RISE organization, and he knocked out Eiji Ogawa in the first round with a left low kick. After this bout he signed NJKF and started fighting under their banner. His second fight was on September 24 at NJKF "Infinity Challenge VIII" against Takuya Minekawa, which he won by a third-round technical knockout.

On January 15, 2006, Yamato was chosen and awarded the 2005 Rookie Award by NJKF.

After Yamato's career of three years with NJKF, he was asked to compete for the vacant NJKF Lightweight title in 2008, in a four-man tournament. He fought against Hiromi Nakayama in the semi-final at NJKF "Start Of New Legend II" on March 8. He won by a technical knockout in the fourth round because of a cut by an elbow strike. He fought against Hanawa in the tournament title at NJKF "Start Of New Legend IX" on July 27, 2008, and he knocked him out in the first round with a left hook.

On January 25, 2009, Yamato was chosen and awarded 2008 MVP by NJKF and Bout Review.

In the middle of 2009, he was asked to participate in the WBC Muaythai Japanese Championship Tournament as a lightweight, as the New Japanese Kickboxing Federation, Martial Arts Japan Kickboxing Federation and Japan Professional Muaythai Committee announced that they were going to establish a unified championships sanctioned by WBC Muaythai.

On September 23, he fought against Kazuya Oe in the semi-final, and he knocked him out with body shot in the 2nd round. In the tournament final on December 4, he fought against Yūdai Kono for the inaugural WBC Muaythai Japanese title. He won by technical knockout due to cut, as the bout was stopped by a doctor in the fourth round.

On January 24, 2010, he was awarded the 2009 Outstanding Performance Award by NJKF.

On March 14, 2010, Yamato fought against Saenchai Sor Kingstar from Thailand in Los Angeles, US to challenge the vacant world lightweight title sanctioned by Muay Thai Association of America. He was knocked out by left high kick in the first round.

=== K-1 ===
==== 2010 K-1 MAX Japan Tournament ====
Yamato took part in the 2010 K-1 World MAX Lightweight Japan Tournament and faced the 2009 Krush Lightweight tournament winner Masahiro Yamamoto in the Round of 16 bout, which took place on May 2, 2010. The fight was ruled a majority decision draw after the first two rounds, with one judge scoring the bout in favor of Yamato. Yamato was awarded the unanimous decision after the extra fourth round was contested, with all three judges scoring the bout 10–7 in his favor. He twice knocked Yamamoto down in the final round, the first time with a right hook and the second time with a knee to the body.

Yamato faced the RISE super featherweight champion Yuki in the quarterfinals of the Japan Tournament final, which took place on July 5, 2010. He knocked his opponent out with a counter left hook in the final seconds of the opening round. Yamato faced Kizaemon Saiga in the semifinals. After an even first round that was scored 10–10 by all three judges, Yamato was able to floor Saiga with a left hook near the end of the next round. Yamato captured the tournament title with a third-round knockout of Yuta Kubo in the finals.

==== Between the tournaments ====
Yamato faced the undefeated Koya Urabe at Krush.10 on September 20, 2010. In front of an audience of 1,800 people, he lost the fight by unanimous decision, with all three judges scoring the bout 30–26 in favor of Urabe. Yamato was knocked down in the first round with a right straight. Yamato next faced the former mixed martial artist, who was making his kickboxing debut, Akiyo Nishiura at Dynamite!! 2010 on December 31, 2010. The fight was ruled a majority decision draw, with one judge scoring it for Yamato. He returned to his winning ways in his next fight, as he overcame Makoto Nishiyama by a second-round technical knockout at New Japan Blood 3 on May 21, 2011.

==== 2011 K-1 MAX Japan Tournament ====
Yamato participated in the K-1 World MAX 2011 -63kg Japan Tournament Final as well, which took place on June 25, 2011. He faced the inaugural Krush super lightweight champion Hiroya in the quarterfinals. Yamato won the fight by unanimous decision, with three scorecards of 29–28. He advanced to the semifinals, where he faced Koya Urabe, who had beaten him by unanimous decision just nine months prior. Yamato once again suffered a unanimous decision loss, with scores of 30–28, 29–28 and 30–28.

Yamato faced the two-time Rajadamnern Stadium champion Jomthong Chuwattana at WBC Japan 2: The Path to the World Champion on October 3, 2011. He won the fight by unanimous decision, with all three judges scoring the bout 50–47 for him. Yamato faced Ryuji Kajiwara for the Krush Lightweight Championship at Krush.14 on December 9, 2011, but lost via unanimous decision.

=== NJKF ===
==== WBC Muaythai International Champion ====
Yamato knocked out former Lumpinee Stadium champion Densiam Lookprabaht in the first round on February 18, 2012. Yamato won his next bout as well, as he beat Sergio Wielzen by unanimous decision at Hoost Cup: Feast of the Kings on May 20, 2012.

Yamato challenged the WBC Muay Thai Japan Super Lightweight champion Seiji Takahashi at NJKF: Kick to the Future 3 on June 24, 2012. The winner of the bout was furthermore guaranteed a chance to fight for the vacant WBC Muaythai International title as well. Yamato won the fight by unanimous decision.

He was scheduled to face Leo Monteiro for the vacant WBC Muaythai International Super Lightweight Championship on September 22, 2012, at NJKF's Kick to the Future 6 in Tokyo, Japan. Monteiro was replaced by Paul Karpowicz, however. Yamato defeated Karpowicz via unanimous decision (49–48, 49–48, 50-48) to win the title.

Yamato faced Gansuwan Sasiprapa at NJFK 2013 1st on February 17, 2013. He lost the fight by unanimous decision. After suffering a technical knockout loss due to cut to Sagetdao Petpayathai on May 16, 2013, Yamato was booked to face Kevin Ross at Lion Fight 11 on September 20, 2013. He won the fight by split decision.

Yamato made his first WBC Muaythai International Super Lightweight title defense against Masaaki Noiri at NJKF 2014 1st on February 16, 2014. He retained the belt by unanimous decision, with scores of 49–47, 50–47 and 49–48. Yamato opened a cut above Noiri's right eye with an elbow strike in the second round. The ringside physician was immediately called in to check whether Noiri can continue competing allowed the bout to resume.

==== WBC Muaythai World Champion ====
Yamato challenged the WBC Muaythai World Super Lightweight champion Sagetdao Petpayathai at NJKF 2014 8th on November 15, 2014. Despite being knocked down with an elbow in the third round, Yamato was able to land an elbow strike of his own which opened a cut on Sagetdao. This cut was examined by the ringside physician, who advised the referee to stop the fight.

Yamato challenged Kevin Ross for the Lion Fight Super Lightweight Championship at Lion Fight 21 on March 27, 2015. The bout was a rematch of their fight, which took place on September 20, 2013, that Yamato won by split decision. Yamato won the fight by a first-round technical knockout, stopping Ross with elbows near the end of the opening frame.

Yamato faced Kongsak Sitboonmee in a non-title bout at NJKF 2015 3rd on May 10, 2015. He lost the fight by unanimous decision, with scores of 49–48, 49–48 and 49–47. Following this stumble, Yamato made his maiden WBC Muaythai World Super Lightweight title defense against Aranchai Kiatpatarapan at NJKF 2015 6th on September 27, 2015. He lost the fight by decision.

Yamato faced Pakorn PKSaenchaimuaythaigym at Hoost Cup Kings Nagoya on December 27, 2015. He won the fight by majority decision. Yamato next faced Liam Harrison for the vacant Yokkao World 65 kg championship at Yokkao 17 on March 19, 2016. He lost the fight by decision.

=== Return to K-1 ===
==== Early fights ====
Yamato fought a rematch with Hiroya at K-1 World GP 2017: Super Bantamweight Tournament on April 22, 2017. He won the fight by a second-round knockout. Yamato next faced Elson Patrick at Krush.79 in Nagoya on August 20, 2017. He once again won the fight by stoppage, as he floored Patrick with a right straight at the 2:05 minute mark of the second round. Yamato extended his win streak to three consecutive fights with a first round knockout of Jun Nakazawa at K-1 World GP 2017 Heavyweight Championship Tournament on November 23, 2017.

These three victories earned Yamato the right to challenge for the title, as he was booked to face the K-1 Super Lightweight champion Masaaki Noiri at K-1 World GP 2018: K'FESTA.1 on March 21, 2018. He previously beat Noiri by unanimous decision on February 16, 2014. Yamato failed to replicate his earlier success, as he lost the fight by a third-round knockout. He was twice knocked down prior to the stoppage, with a flying knee in the first round and with a flurry of punches in the third round.

Yamato faced Cui Jianhui at Krush 92 on August 18, 2018. He won the fight by a second-round knockout. This earned him a place in the 2018 K-1 Super Lightweight Grand Prix, which took place on November 3, 2018. Yamato faced the 2014 and 2016 K-1 Super Lightweight Grand Prix winner in the quarterfinals of the one-day tournament. He lost the fight by a first-round knockout.

Yamato faced Kensei Kondo at K-1 World GP 2019: Japan vs World 5 vs 5 & Special Superfight in Osaka on August 24, 2019. He won the fight by unanimous decision. This would prove to be his only victory in two years, as he would then suffer three losses back to back: to Fukashi Mizutani on December 28, 2019, to Daizo Sasaki on December 13, 2020, and Tapruwan Hadesworkout on July 11, 2021.

==== Super Lightweight Champion ====
Yamato was scheduled to face Hideaki Yamazaki for the K-1 World GP Super Lightweight Championship at K-1: K'Festa 5 on April 3, 2022. He won the title by first-round knockout. Yamato landed a left hook with 50 seconds into the bout, which left Yamazaki unable to rise from the canvas. The stoppage was later given "Knockout of the Year" honors by K-1.

Yamato made his first title defense against the Krush Super Lightweight champion Daizo Sasaki at K-1 World GP 2022 Yokohamatsuri on June 17, 2022. He had lost to Sasaki by unanimous decision two years prior. Yamato won the rematch by unanimous decision, with scores of 30–28, 30–28 and 29–28.

Yamato made his second title defense against the one-time K-1 Lightweight champion Kenta Hayashi at K-1 World GP 2023: K'Festa 6 on March 12, 2023. He won the fight by unanimous decision, with scores of 29–27, 29–28 and 30–27. Yamato scored the sole knockdown of the fight in the first round, as he was able to knock Hayashi down with a right cross.

Yamato vacated the K-1 World GP Super Lightweight Championship on March 8, 2024.

=== Departure from K-1 ===
Yamato faced the former Lumpinee Stadium super-featherweight champion Kaewkangwan Sithporkae at Suk Wanchai MuayThai Super Fight on June 30, 2024. He lost the fight by unanimous decision, with scores of 49–47, 49–47 and 49–46.

Yamato faced The Star Petchkiatpetch at Rajadamnern World Series Japan on December 1, 2024.

== Titles ==
- Lion Fight
  - 2015 Lion Fight World Super Lightweight Championship
- World Boxing Council Muaythai
  - 2014 WBC Muaythai World Super Lightweight (-63.5 kg/140 lb) Championship
  - 2012 WBC Muaythai International Super Lightweight Championship
  - 2012 WBC Muaythai Japanese Super Lightweight Championship
  - 2009 WBC Muaythai Japanese Lightweight Championship
- K-1
  - 2022 K-1 World GP Super Lightweight Championship
    - Two successful title defenses
  - 2010 K-1 WORLD MAX 2010 -63kg Japan Tournament Winner
- World Muaythai Council
  - 2009 WMC Intercontinental Lightweight champion
- New Japan Kickboxing Federation
  - 2008 NJKF Lightweight Championship

Awards

- New Japan Kickboxing Federation
  - 2009 NJKF "Outstanding Performance Award"
  - 2008 NJKF "Fighter of the Year"
  - 2005 NJKF "Rookie of the Year"
- eFight.jp
  - 2x Fighter of the Month (February, November 2014)
- Combat Press
  - 2017 Comeback Fighter of the Year
- K-1
  - 2022 K-1 Knockout of the Year (vs. Hideaki Yamazaki)

== Kickboxing and Muay Thai record ==
Professional kickboxing record
44 Wins (30 (T)KO's), 22 Losses, 1 Draw
Date	Result	Opponent	Event	Location	Method	Round	Time	Record
2024-12-01	Loss	(Thailand) The Star Petchkiatpetch	Rajadamnern World Series Japan	Yokohama, Japan	Decision (Unanimous)	3	3:00	44–22–1
2024-06-30	Loss	(Thailand) Kaewkangwan Sithporkae	Suk Wanchai MuayThai Super Fight	Nagoya, Japan	Decision (Unanimous)	5	3:00	44–21–1
2023-03-12	Win	(Japan) Kenta Hayashi	K-1 World GP 2023: K'Festa 6	Tokyo, Japan	Decision (Unanimous)	3	3:00	44–20–1
Defends the K-1 Super Lightweight Championship.
2022-09-11	Win	(Japan) Daizo Sasaki	K-1 World GP 2022 Yokohamatsuri	Yokohama, Japan	Decision (Unanimous)	3	3:00	43–20–1
Defends the K-1 Super Lightweight Championship.
2022-04-03	Win	(Japan) Hideaki Yamazaki	K-1: K'Festa 5	Tokyo, Japan	KO (Left hook)	1	0:50	42–20–1
Wins the K-1 Super Lightweight Championship.
2021-12-04	Win	(Japan) Yujiro Ono	K-1 World GP 2021 in Osaka	Osaka, Japan	KO (Punches)	3	0:28	41–20–1
2021-07-11	Loss	(Thailand) Tapruwan Hadesworkout	NJKF - Yamato Gym 50th Anniversary Yamato Matsuri	Nagoya, Japan	TKO (Doctor stoppage/cut)	1	2:32	40–20–1
2020-12-13	Loss	(Japan) Daizo Sasaki	K-1 World GP 2020 Winter's Crucial Bout	Tokyo, Japan	Decision (Unanimous)	3	3:00	40–19–1
2019-12-28	Loss	(Japan) Fukashi	K-1 World GP 2019 Japan: ～Women's Flyweight Championship Tournament～	Nagoya, Japan	KO (Punches)	2	0:34	40–18–1
2019-08-24	Win	(Japan) Kensei Kondo	K-1 World GP 2019: Japan vs World 5 vs 5 & Special Superfight in Osaka	Osaka, Japan	Decision (Unanimous)	3	3:00	40–17–1
2018-11-03	Loss	(Thailand) Kaew Weerasakreck	K-1 World GP 2018: 3rd Super Lightweight Championship Tournament, Quarter Finals	Saitama Prefecture, Japan	KO (Left High Kick)	1	1:30	39–17–1
2018-08-18	Win	(China) Cui Jianhui	Krush 92	Japan	KO (Left Hook to the Body)	2	2:46	39-16-1
2018-03-21	Loss	(Japan) Masaaki Noiri	K-1 World GP 2018: K'FESTA.1	Saitama, Japan	KO (Punches)	3	2:55	38–16–1
For the K-1 Super Lightweight Championship.
2017-11-23	Win	(Japan) Jun Nakazawa	K-1 World GP 2017 Heavyweight Championship Tournament, Superfight	Saitama, Japan	KO (Left Hook)	1	2:24	38–15–1
2017-08-20	Win	(England) Elson Patrick	Krush.79 in Nagoya	Nagoya, Japan	KO (Straight Right)	2	2:05	37–15–1
2017-04-22	Win	(Japan) Hiroya	K-1 World GP 2017: Super Bantamweight Tournament	Tokyo, Japan	KO (Left hook)	2	1:06	36–15–1
2016-08-07	Loss	(Thailand) Petchtanong Banchamek	Kunlun Fight 49 / Rebels 45 - 65 kg 2016 Tournament 1/8 Finals	Tokyo, Japan	Decision	3	3:00	35–15–1
2016-03-19	Loss	(England) Liam Harrison	Yokkao 17	Bolton, England	Decision	5	3:00	35–14–1
For the vacant Yokkao World 65kg/143lb Championship.
2015-12-27	Win	(Thailand) Pakorn PKSaenchaimuaythaigym	Hoost Cup Kings Nagoya	Nagoya, Japan	Decision (Majority)	5	3:00	35–13–1
2015-09-27	Loss	(Thailand) Aranchai Kiatpatarapan	NJKF 2015 6th	Japan	Decision	5	3:00	34–13–1
Loses the WBC Muaythai World Super Lightweight (-63.5 kg/140 lb) Championship.
2015-05-10	Loss	(Thailand) Kongsak Sitboonmee	NJKF 2015 3rd	Japan	Decision (Unanimous)	5	3:00	34–12–1
2015-03-27	Win	(United States) Kevin Ross	Lion Fight 21	Temecula, CA	TKO (Elbows)	1	2:43	34–11–1
Wins the Lion Fight Super Lightweight Championship.
2014-11-15	Win	(Thailand) Sagetdao Petpayathai	NJKF 2014 8th	Tokyo, Japan	TKO (cut)	3	1:53	33–11–1
For the WBC Muaythai World Super Lightweight (-63.5 kg/140 lb) Championship.
2014-07-21	Win	(Thailand) Faipa Sitboonmee	NJKF	Tokyo, Japan	TKO (Ref stoppage)	3	3:00	32–11–1
2014-02-16	Win	(Japan) Masaaki Noiri	NJKF 2014 1st	Tokyo, Japan	Decision (unanimous)	5	3:00	31–11–1
Defends the WBC Muaythai International Super Lightweight (-63.5 kg/140 lb) Championship.
2013-09-20	Win	(United States) Kevin Ross	Lion Fight 11	Las Vegas, Nevada, USA	Decision (split)	5	3:00	30–11–1
2013-05-16	Loss	(Thailand) Sagetdao Petpayathai	M-One: Reborn	Highland, California, USA	TKO (cut)	4	1:38	29–11–1
2013-02-17	Loss	(Thailand) Gansuwan Sasiprapa	NJFK 2013 1st	Tokyo, Japan	Decision(unanimous)	3	3:00	29–10–1
2012-09-22	Win	(Poland) Paul Karpowicz	NJKF: Kick to the Future 6	Tokyo, Japan	Decision (unanimous)	5	3:00	29–9–1
For the WBC Muay Thai International Super Lightweight title (-63.5 kg/140 lb) Championship.
2012-06-24	Win	(Japan) Seiji Takahashi	NJKF: Kick to the Future 3	Tokyo, Japan	Decision (unanimous)	5	3:00	28–9–1
For the WBC Muay Thai Japan Super Lightweight title (-63.5 kg/140 lb) Championship.
2012-05-20	Win	(Netherlands) Sergio Wielzen	Hoost Cup: Feast of the Kings	Nagoya, Japan	Decision (unanimous)	3	3:00	27–9–1
2012-02-18	Win	(Thailand) Densiam Lukprabaht	NJKF: Kick to the Future 1	Tokyo, Japan	KO (Punches)	1	2:28	26–9–1
2011-12-09	Loss	(Japan) Ryuji Kajiwara	Krush.14	Tokyo, Japan	Decision (Unanimous)	3	3:00	25–9–1
For Krush Lightweight (62.5 kg) Championship.
2011-10-03	Loss	(Thailand) Jomthong Chuwattana	WBC Japan 2: The Path to the World Champion	Tokyo, Japan	Decision (Unanimous)	5	3:00	25–8–1
2011-08-14	Win	(Thailand) Sugar Cane Coke Chunawat	M-1 Grand Muay Thai Championship	Los Angeles, California, USA	TKO (Cut)	3	2:24	25–7–1
2011-06-25	Loss	(Japan) Koya Urabe	K-1 World MAX 2011 –63 kg Japan Tournament Final, Semi final	Tokyo, Japan	Decision (Unanimous)	3	3:00	24–7–1
2011-06-25	Win	(Japan) Hiroya	K-1 World MAX 2011 –63 kg Japan Tournament Final, Quarter final	Tokyo, Japan	Decision (Unanimous)	3	3:00	24–6–1
2011-05-21	Win	(Japan) Makoto Nishiyama	New Japan Blood 3	Tokyo, Japan	TKO (Ref stop/three knockdowns)	2	1:30	23–6–1
2010-12-31	Draw	(Japan) Akiyo Nishiura	Dynamite!! 2010	Saitama, Japan	Decision (Majority Draw)	3	5:00	22–6–1
2010-09-20	Loss	(Japan) Koya Urabe	GoodLoser "Krush.10"	Bunkyō, Tokyo, Japan	Decision (Unanimous)	3	3:00	22–6
2010-07-05	Win	(Japan) Yuta Kubo	K-1 World MAX 2010 -63kg Japan Tournament Final, Final	Shibuya, Tokyo, Japan	KO (Left hook)	3	1:26	22–5
Wins K-1 World MAX 2010 -63 kg Japan Tournament.
2010-07-05	Win	(Japan) Kizaemon Saiga	K-1 World MAX 2010 -63kg Japan Tournament Final, Semi-final	Shibuya, Tokyo, Japan	KO (Left hook)	2	2:13	21–5
2010-07-05	Win	(Japan) Yuki	K-1 World MAX 2010 -63kg Japan Tournament Final, Quarter-final	Shibuya, Tokyo, Japan	KO (Left hook)	1	3:03	20–5
2010-05-02	Win	(Japan) Masahiro Yamamoto	K-1 World MAX 2010 -63kg Japan Tournament Final 16	Bunkyō, Tokyo, Japan	Decision (Unanimous)	4(Ex.1)	3:00	19–5
2010-03-14	Loss	(Thailand) Saenchai Sor Kingstar	World Champion Muay Thai Extravaganza	El Monte, California, United States	KO (Left high kick)	1	2:13	18–5
For the vacant MTAA World Lightweight (135lbs) title.
2009-12-23	Win	(Thailand) Ratchayothin Sangmorakot	Yamato gym 40th & Nagoya JK Factory 20th Anniversary: "The Origin Of Kick Boxing"	Nagoya, Aichi, Japan	KO (Left body shot)	3	1:05	18–4
2009-12-04	Win	(Japan) Yūdai Kōno	MAJKF "Break Through-14"	Bunkyō, Tokyo, Japan	TKO (Doctor stop/cut)	4	2:22	17–4
Wins the inaugural WBC Muaythai Japanese Lightweight title.
2009-10-12	Loss	(Thailand) Densiam Lookprabath	NJKF "MuayThai Open 9"	Bunkyō, Tokyo, Japan	Decision (Unanimous)	5	3:00	16–4
2009-09-23	Win	(Japan) Kazuya Ōe	NJKF "Road To Real King 11"	Bunkyō, Tokyo, Japan	KO	2	2:15	16–3
2009-07-19	Win	(Thailand) Kaensak Sor.Ploenjit	Ultimate Warriors	Anaheim, California, United States	KO (Left body shot)	5	2:59	15–3
Wins the WMC International Lightweight title.
2009-07-05	Win	(Thailand) Maki Lansayam	Nagoyakick "Summer Fes.09 Freedom"	Nagoya, Aichi, Japan	TKO (Cut)	2	2:30	14–3
2009-04-12	Win	(Japan) Sohta	MAJKF "Break Though-10"	Bunkyō, Tokyo, Japan	KO (Right cross)	1	2:32	13–3
2008-12-23	Win	(Thailand) Pathiban Sor.Kobayashi	Nagoyakick " DrumRoll Please!!"	Nagoya, Aichi, Japan	Decision (Unanimous)	5	3:00	12–3
2008-11-09	Win	(Japan) Yasutaku	NJKF "Start Of New Legend XIII"	Bunkyō, Tokyo, Japan	TKO (Doctor stoppage/Cut)	3	1:51	11–3
2008-07-27	Win	(Japan) Hanawa	NJKF "Start Of New Legend IX"	Bunkyō, Tokyo, Japan	KO (Left hook)	1	0:42	10–3
Wins the vacant NJKF Lightweight title.
2008-03-08	Win	(Japan) Hiromi Nakayama	NJKF "Start Of New Legend II"	Bunkyō, Tokyo, Japan	TKO (Referee stoppage/Cut)	4	1:16	9–3
2007-11-23	Loss	(Thailand) Kanongsukk Weerasakreck	NJKF "Fighting Evolution XIII"	Bunkyō, Tokyo, Japan	KO (Right cross)	2	2:46	8–3
2007-09-02	Win	(Japan) Ikki	NJKF "Fighting Evolution X"	Bunkyō, Tokyo, Japan	KO (Right cross)	5	2:59	8–2
2007-07-01	Win	(Japan) Ganba Kuroda	NJKF "Fighting Evolution VIII"	Bunkyō, Tokyo, Japan	TKO (Corner stoppage)	5	0:35	7–2
2007-01-28	Loss	(Thailand) Yoryut	NJKF "Fighting Evolution II"	Bunkyō, Tokyo, Japan	Decision (Unanimous)	5	3:00	6–2
2006-11-23	Win	(Japan) Orokamono	NJKF "Advance X"	Bunkyō, Tokyo, Japan	TKO (Corner stoppage)	3	0:20	6–1
2006-09-24	Win	(Japan) Mishima	NJKF "Advance VIII"	Bunkyō, Tokyo, Japan	KO (Right hook)	2	2:17	5–1
2006-07-02	Win	(Japan) Hideo	NJKF "Advance VI"	Bunkyō, Tokyo, Japan	Decision (Unanimous)	3	3:00	4–1
2006-05-14	Win	(Japan) Kozaru	NJKF "Advance V Young Fight"	Bunkyō, Tokyo, Japan	Decision (Unanimous)	3	3:00	3–1
2006-01-15	Loss	(Japan) Ikki	NJKF "Advance I"	Bunkyō, Tokyo, Japan	Decision (Unanimous)	3	3:00	2–1
2005-09-24	Win	(Japan) Takuya Minekawa	NJKF "Infinity Challenge VIII"	Bunkyō, Tokyo, Japan	TKO	3	1:19	2–0
2005-07-31	Win	(Japan) Eiji Ogawa	KGS "R.I.S.E. XVII"	Bunkyō, Tokyo, Japan	KO (Left low kick)	1	1:15	1–0
Legend: Win Loss Draw/No contest Notes

== Mixed martial arts record ==
Professional record breakdown
1 match	0 wins	1 loss
By submission	0	1

Res.	Record	Opponent	Method	Event	Date	Round	Time	Location	Notes
Loss	0–1	Takahiro Okuyama	Submission (armbar)	Rizin 51	September 28, 2025	1	4:10	Nagoya, Japan	

== See also ==
- List of K-1 events
- List of K-1 champions
- List of male kickboxers
