= Yuta Kubo =

Japanese kickboxer (born 1987)

- Born: Kubo Yūta; October 19, 1987 (age 39); Tachikawa, Tokyo, Japan
- Native name: 久保優太
- Other names: Kubokyun, The Smiling Sniper
- Height: 1.75 m (5 ft 9 in)
- Weight: 65 kg (143 lb; 10.2 st)
- Reach: 70 in (180 cm)
- Style: Kickboxing, Taekwondo
- Stance: Orthodox
- Fighting out of: Tokyo, Japan
- Team: Tachikawa Kickboxing Academy (2005-2008); Unlimited Kickboxing Gym Survivor (2009-2010); DC Lab Gym (2011); Fighting Gym Kairos (2011-2015); K-1 Gym Gotanda Team Kings (2016-2020); Purge Tokyo (2021-present)
- Years active: 2005–2020 (Kickboxing); 2021–present (MMA)

Kickboxing record
- Total: 61
- Wins: 49
- By knockout: 19
- Losses: 10
- By knockout: 3
- Draws: 2

Mixed martial arts record
- Total: 9
- Wins: 5
- By knockout: 2
- By submission: 1
- By decision: 2
- Losses: 3
- By knockout: 2
- By decision: 1
- No contests: 1

Other information
- Occupation: Gym Owner, Coach
- Notable relatives: Kenji Kubo (brother)
- Website: ameblo.jp/kubo-yuta/

Yuta Kubo (Japanese: 久保優太, Kubo Yuta; born October 19, 1987) is a Japanese mixed martial artist and former kickboxer, currently competing in the featherweight division of Rizin Fighting Federation.

As a professional kickboxer, Kubo is the former Krush and K-1 welterweight (-67.5 kg) champion. Kubo was furthermore the 2011 K-1 World MAX Lightweight (-63 kg) Japan Tournament winner, 2013 Krush Welterweight (-67.5 kg) Grand Prix winner, 2013 Glory 65kg Slam Tournament Winner, and the 2017 K-1 World GP Welterweight (-67.5 kg) World Grand Prix Winner.

Combat Press ranked him as a top ten featherweight kickboxer in the world between September 2014 and July 2016, as well as between April and July 2020.

== Controversy ==
In September 2016, Kubo was detained and arrested by the Tokyo Metropolitan Police Department on allegations of assault causing bodily harm raised by his then-wife. According to his ex-wife's testimony, she was verbally and physically assaulted by Kubo, who was upset over a failed stock investment. Kubo punched the woman several times in the head, causing eardrum rupture in both of her ears, which left long-term residual effects in one of the ears. After divorcing, the two reached an out-of-court settlement, which obliged Kubo to pay his wife an undisclosed amount in damages, but spared him from being prosecuted by the Public Prosecutors Office.

== Kickboxing career ==
=== Featherweight ===
==== Early career ====
Yuta Kubo was put practicing taekwondo at age of 8 with his younger brother, Kenji under a Zanichi Korean family friend. He eventually took up kickboxing at the age of 15. Kubo made his professional kickboxing debut on January 22, 2005, against Shinji Aseishi as a featherweight (-57.15 kg) at NJKF "Infinite Challenge I", as a high school student. He won the fight by unanimous decision, with all three judges scoring the bout 30–27 in his favor.

Kubo fought three more times over the course of the next six months, amassing a perfect 4–0 record, with his final victory over Kozaru at NJKF "Infinite Challenge VII" on July 23, 2005, earning him the #10 spot in the NJKF featherweight rankings. His stoppage wins over the #9 ranked Shōkō on September 24, 2005, and the #5 ranked Yoshiaki Takano on November 20, 2005, as well as his unanimous decision triumph over Shōgo Kokubun on March 6, 2006, earned him the right to face top-ranked Masato Ōkawa in an NJKF featherweight title eliminator, which was held at NJKF "Advance IV" on May 3, 2006. He won the fight by unanimous decision, with scores of 50–47, 50–46 and 50–46.

Kubo was expected to face Yoshinari Nakasuka at "Shinou Hai" on July 22, 2006. He was forced to withdraw from the contest on June 17, as he suffered an injury in training and was sidelined for the next two months. Kubo was replaced by Kōji Okuyama, who stepped in on a month's notice.

Kubo faced Nichau Sithaikeriangtor in a super featherweight (-60 kg) bout at the Rajadamnern Stadium on September 10, 2006. He won the fight by a third-round knockout. Kubo next faced Kenpeth Shinongchai in an -84 kg catchweight bout on September 16, 2006. He won the fight by a third-round knockout.

==== NJKF champion ====
Kubo was expected to challenge the NJKF featherweight champion Nobuhiro Iwai at "NJKF Shinnou Cup Final" on November 23, 2006. Iwai withdrew from the contest on November 1, after suffering an injury in training. Kubo was subsequently promoted to interim champion status.

Kubo was expected to face an unnamed Thai opponent in a -59 kg catchweight bout on the "Thai King's Birthday" event on December 5, 2006. His opponent withdrew on the day of the fight and was replaced by Somdet Por.Pantie, with the contest being upgraded to a -90 kg catchweight bout as a result. Kubo won the fight by a fourth-round knockout.

Kubo faced the WMC Hong Kong Super Featherweight champion Daniel in a -58.5 kg catchweight bout at NJKF "Fighting Evolution II -Muay Thai Open-" on January 28, 2007. He won the fight by unanimous decision, with three scorecards of 49–45. Kubo was able to knock his opponent down once, with a left hook, in the second round.

Kubo faced Nobuhiro Iwai for the undisputed NJKF featherweight championship at NJKF "Fighting Evolution III -3 Kings Champion Carnival-" on March 18, 2007. The pair was originally scheduled to face each other on November 23, before Iwai withdrew with an injury and was therefore stripped of the title, although he was ranked as the #1 contender for the vacant title. Kubo won the fight by a second-round technical knockout. The bout was stopped by the referee, on the advice of the ringside physician, due to a cut on Iwai's forehead. Following this victory, Kubo was ranked as the second-best featherweight in the WBC Muaythai Japan rankings, only behind Genki Yamamoto.

Kubo faced Farkamwang SKV Gym at NJKF "Fighting Evolution VI" on May 13, 2007, in a WINDY CUP sponsored fight, who offered the winner an additional prize of ฿100,000 (~¥360,000). He won the fight by majority decision, with scores of 50–49, 50–50 and 50–48.

=== Super featherweight ===
Kubo faced Chaichana Patong Gym for the WPMO World Super featherweight (-60 kg) championship at "World Muay Thai Federation Championship" on July 3, 2007. He won the fight by a fifth-round knockout. Kubo next faced Soug-Uk Lee at NJKF "Fighting Evolution VIII -The Next Generation-" on September 2, 2007. He won the fight by a third-round knockout.

Kubo's 16-fight undefeated streak was snapped by Nuang Solia, who was able to overcome the Japanese fighter by unanimous decision at a "Removing Land Mines" charity event, held on November 21, 2007. Kubo was then booked to face Shunta Ito at NJKF "Start Of New Legend" on January 27, 2008. Ito won the fight by unanimous decision. Kubo suffered the first knockdown of his professional career during this fight, as his opponent dropped him with a left hook in the fourth round.

Kubo challenged the WMAF World Super featherweight champion Takashi "TURBO" Nagatsuka at MAJKF "Break Through - 3" on April 29, 2008. The fight was ruled a split decision draw, with one 49–48 scorecard for Kubo and Nagatsuka respectively, as well as one even 49–49 scorecard.

Kubo was expected to face Rashata at "NJKF Start of a New Legend IX" on July 27, 2008, but was forced to withdraw after being diagnosed with bladder stones.

=== Lightweight ===
==== Early Krush fights ====
Kubo faced Yosuke Mizuochi in the reserve bout of the 2009 Krush Lightweight Grand Prix, held on November 2, 2009. He won the fight by majority decision. As the one of tournament finalists, Naoki Ishikawa, was forced to drop out of the contest due to a cut on his left eyelid, Kubo stepped in to face Masahiro Yamamoto in the Grand Prix finals. He lost the fight by unanimous decision.

Kubo faced Tsuyoshi at M&J Presents Survivor Round.2 on December 9, 2009. He won the fight by unanimous decision, with scores of 30–28, 29–28 and 30–28. Kubo next faced Junpei Aotsu at Krush × Survivor on March 13, 2010. He won the fight by unanimous decision, with scores of 30–28, 30–29 and 30–28.

==== 2010 K-1 MAX Japan Tournament ====
Kubo faced "DJ" Taiki Hata in the round of 16 of the 2010 K-1 Japan MAX Lightweight (-62.5 kg) tournament, held on May 2, 2010, to determine the eight fighters that would take part in the one-day final tournament on July 5, 2010. He won the fight by a dominant unanimous decision, with all three ringside officials awarding him a 30–27 scorecard. Kubo faced Keiji Ozaki in the quarterfinals of the 2010 K-1 MAX tournament on July 5. He triumphed over the veteran by unanimous decision, with three scorecards of 30–29. Kubo faced Yoshimichi Matsumoto in the semifinals and was able to make quick work of his opponent, stopping him with a question mark kick 81 seconds into the opening round. Kubo faced the WBC Muaythai Japan lightweight champion Tetsuya Yamato in the tournament finals. In spite of his early success, which saw him knock Yamato down with a left straight in the very first round of the contest, he was nonetheless knocked out by Yamato at the 1:26 minute mark of the final round.

==== 2011 K-1 MAX Japan Tournament ====
After suffering a career-first stoppage loss at the hands of Tetsuya Yamato, Kubo was booked to face Hiroya at K-1 World MAX 2010 -70kg World Championship Tournament Final on November 8, 2010. He won the fight by unanimous decision. Kubo next faced Densiam Lukprabaht at Survivor -Round.7- on May 27, 2011. He won the fight by a third-round knockout.

These two victories earned Kubo a place in the K-1 World MAX 2011 –63 kg Japan Tournament Final, which was held on June 25, 2011. Kubo faced Kizaemon Saiga in the quarterfinals of the one-day tournament and was able to overcome him by a narrow majority decision, with scores of 30–29, 30–30 and 30–29. Advancing to the semifinals, he faced the 2009 K-1 Koshien winner Masaaki Noiri. Kubo won the fight by a more convincing unanimous decision, with three scorecards of 30–29 in his favor. Kubo then faced Koya Urabe in the finals of the one-day tournament. He won the fight by unanimous decision, with scores of 30–28, 30–29 and 30–28. During a post-fight interview, Kubo stated he intended to retire had he not won the tournament, having said as much to his sponsors before the event took place.

Kubo faced Andre Brul at K-1 World MAX 2011 -70kg Japan Tournament Final on September 25, 2011, in what was his final appearance at lightweight. He won the fight by a wide unanimous decision, with two scorecards of 30–24 and one scorecard of 30–25. Kubo was able to knock Brul down twice in the opening round, with a middle kick and a knee to the body, as well as once in the second round, with a crescent kick.

=== Welterweight ===
==== Move up in weight ====
Kubo faced Tristan Benard in a -64 kg catchweight bout at Krush 13 on November 12, 2011. He won the fight by a third-round knockout. Kubo faced Nils Widlund in another -64 kg catchweight bout at Fight For Japan: Genki Desu Ka Omisoka 2011 on December 31, 2011. He won the fight by a third-round knockout, flooring Widlung with a high kick at the 1:10 minute mark of the round.

On February 17, 2012, at Krush 16, Kubo defeated Charles François via second-round knockout to win the vacant ISKA World Light-Welterweight (64.5 kg) Championship in Tokyo, Japan.

On June 8, 2012, At Krush 18 in Tokyo, Japan, Yuta faced Abdellah Ezbiri. Despite his aggressive style Ezbiri seemed gun shy in the 1st round giving it to his opponent. Yuta dropped Ezbiri twice in the second, the 1st time with a right hook, the second with a spinning back fist but got up both times showing extreme toughness and heart and stayed on his feet in the 3rd even though Kubo is known for finishing his opponents quickly when he smells blood. Yuta Kubo won the fight by unanimous decision.

Kubo faced Yuya Yamato at Krush.22 on August 26, 2012. He won the fight by a second-round knockout.

He was expected to make his middleweight (-70 kg) debut at Glory 4: Tokyo - 2012 Heavyweight Grand Slam on December 2, 2012, against an unnamed opponent, but it fell through after the event was moved back to December 31 and combined with Dream 18.

==== Krush Welterweight Grand Prix ====
Kubo competed in the Krush Grand Prix 2013 ~67kg First Class Tournament~ on January 14, 2012, and was initially set to fight Houcine Bennoui in the quarter-finals. However, Bennoui pulled out and was replaced by Roman Mailov. Mailov then sustained an injury in training as well, though, and lowly-ranked TaCa was brought in as Kubo's third opponent. He stopped TaCa with one of his signature body shots in round two. In the semis, Kubo dropped Shintaro Matsukura with a first round punch to the body and cruised to a unanimous decision but not without taking significant damage to his lead leg. A rematch with Abdellah Ezbiri then awaited him in the final. Kubo started the fight well but the tide started to turn in round two when Ezbiri began taking advantage of his injured leg to the point where he was having trouble standing. The bout was scored a unanimous draw after the regulation three rounds and so it went to a first extension round which was called a majority draw, much to the distaste of the crowd who booed the decision as they believed Ezbiri was dominant. Kubo rallied in the second extension round to take a unanimous decision, winning the tournament and the inaugural Krush 67 kg title.

=== Super lightweight ===
==== Glory Slam Tournament ====
Kubo faced Lim Chi-Bin in the quarterfinals of the 2013 Glory Featherweight (-65 kg) Slam Tournament, held at Glory 8: Tokyo on May 3, 2013. He won the fight by a second-round knockout. Kubo knocked Lim down with a knee to the midsection in the clinch in the final seconds of the round, which left the Korean unable to rise from the canvas. Kubo overcame Gabriel Varga by unanimous decision in the tournament semifinals and faced Masaaki Noiri in the finals of the one-day contest. He won the fight by unanimous decision. Aside from capturing the tournament title, Kubo was furthermore awarded $100,000 in prize money as well.

Kubo had his three year-spanning, seventeen fight win streak broken in his rubber match with Masaaki Noiri at Krush.32 in Nagoya, Japan on September 1, 2013, losing his Krush 67 kg title in the process. He was docked a point for excessive clinching in round three, allowing Noiri to take a wide unanimous decision.

==== Cold streak ====
Kubo faced Mosab Amrani at Glory 13: Tokyo on December 21, 2013. He lost the fight by unanimous decision, with all three judges awarding Amrani all three rounds of the bout.

Kubo faced Raz Sarkisjan in the quarterfinals of the 2014 K-1 World Super Lightweight Grand Prix, held on November 3, 2014. Despite successfully making his way past Sakisijan by way of unanimous decision, Kubo was nonetheless handed his second career stoppage loss by the eventual tournament winner Kaew Fairtex in the semifinals, who floored him with a left hook in the second round.

Kubo faced Yasuomi Soda at K-1 World GP 2015 -55kg Championship Tournament on April 19, 2015. He lost the fight by unanimous decision, with scores of 30–28, 29–27 and 30–27.

Kubo faced Noman in the quarterfinals of the 2016 K-1 World Super Lightweight Grand Prix, which was held on March 4, 2016. He won the fight by unanimous decision, with two scorecards of 30–28 and one scorecard of 30–29 in his favor. Kubo advanced to the semifinals, where he faced Hideaki Yamazaki. Yamazaki, the eventual tournament winner, won the fight by a third-round technical knockout.

=== Return to welterweight ===
==== First fights ====
Kubo faced Keita Makihira at K-1 World GP in Japan Featherweight Championship Tournament on November 2, 2016, in his return to the welterweight (-67.5 kg) division. He won the fight by unanimous decision, with scores of 29–28, 30–29 and 29–27, after knocking Makihara down once in the second round.

Kubo faced Xie Lei at Wu Lin Feng World Championship 2017 on January 14, 2017. He lost the fight by unanimous decision.

Kubo faced Kazuki Yamagiwa at Bigbang 29: Road to Unification on June 4, 2017. The fight ended in a majority decision draw. Although one judge awarded Kubo a 29–28 scorecard, he was overruled by his colleagues, who had the bout scored as an even 29–29 and 28–28 respectively.

==== K-1 World Grand Prix ====
On July 19, 2017, it was announced that Kubo would be one of eight participants of the 2017 K-1 World Welterweight Grand Prix. Kubo faced Minoru Kimura in the quarterfinals of the one-day tournament, which took place on September 18, 2017. He won the fight by unanimous decision, with two scorecards of 29–27 and one scorecard of 30–26 in his favor. Kubo was twice able to knock Kimura down, once in the second and once in the third round. He made quick work of his semifinal opponent, Hitoshi Tsukakoshi, as he twice knocked his opponent down by the 2:36 minute mark of the opening round. Kubo captured the tournament title, as well as the inaugural K-1 World GP Welterweight (-67.5 kg) Championship with a unanimous decision victory over Mohan Dragon in the Grand Prix finals.

==== Title reign ====
Kubo made his fist K-1 World GP Welterweight (-67.5 kg) championship defense against Melsik Baghdasaryan at K-1 World GP 2018: K'FESTA.1 on March 21, 2018. He retained the title by unanimous decision.

Kubo made his second K-1 Welterweight championship defense against the 2008 K-1 World MAX Japan Tournament winner Yasuhiro Kido at K-1 World GP 2019: K’FESTA 2 on March 10, 2019. He won the fight by unanimous decision, after an extra fourth round was contested.

Kubo made his third and final K-1 Welterweight championship defense against the reigning Krush Super Welterweight champion Jordann Pikeur at K-1: K’Festa 3 on March 22, 2020. He won the fight by unanimous decision, with all three judges scoring the bout 30–29 in his favor.

Kubo retired from the sport of kickboxing on August 20, 2020.

== Mixed martial arts career ==
Kubo was scheduled to make his mixed martial arts debut, as a featherweight, against Shinobu Ota at Rizin 30 on September 19, 2021. He lost the fight by unanimous decision.

Kubo faced YouTuber Shibatar in a mixed rules bout at Rizin 33 - Saitama on December 31, 2021. The bout will be two 3 min rounds, with no decision, and the winner only being able to win via KO or submission. Kubo lost the bout via flying armbar in the first round.

Kubo faced Keisuke Okuda at Rizin Landmark 4 on November 6, 2022. He won the fight by TKO stoppage at the end of the first round.

Kubo faced Karate Kinoshita on June 24, 2023, at Rizin 43, winning the bout via split decision.

Kubo faced Rukiya Anpo in a special rules bout at Rizin 45 on December 31, 2023. He won the bout via rear-naked choke at the end of the first round.

Kubo faced Ryogo Takahashi at RIZIN Landmark 9 on March 23, 2024, winning the bout via unanimous decision.

Kubo faced the former Rizin FF Featherweight champion Yutaka Saito at Super Rizin 3 on July 28, 2024. He won the fight by a second-round knockout.

Kubo faced Razhabali Shaydullaev on December 31, 2024, at Rizin 49. He won the bout by TKO in the second round after a ground fight.

Kubo faced Karshyga Dautbek on December 31, 2025, at Rizin: Shiwasu no Cho Tsuwamono Matsuri. The bout ended in a no contest after an accidental eye poke rendered Dautbek unable to continue.

Kubo faced Razhabali Shaydullaev in a rematch for the Rizin Featherweight Championship on April 12, 2026, at Rizin Landmark 13. He lost the bout by TKO in the first round.

== Championships and accomplishments ==
=== Kickboxing ===
- New Japan Kickboxing Federation
  - 2006 NJKF interim Featherweight (-57.5 kg) Championship
  - 2007 NJKF Featherweight (-57.5 kg) Championship
- Krush
  - 2009 Krush Lightweight (-62.5) Grand Prix Runner-up
  - 2013 Krush Welterweight (-67.5 kg) Grand Prix Winner
  - 2013 Krush Welterweight (-67.5 kg) Championship
- K-1
  - 2010 K-1 World MAX Lightweight (-63 kg) Japan Tournament Runner-up
  - 2011 K-1 World MAX Lightweight (-63 kg) Japan Tournament Winner
  - 2017 K-1 World GP Welterweight (-67.5 kg) World Grand Prix Winner
  - 2017 K-1 World GP Welterweight (-67.5 kg) Championship
    - Three successful title defenses
- International Sport Kickboxing Association
  - 2012 ISKA K-1 World Light-Welterweight (64.5 kg) Championship
- GLORY
  - 2013 Glory 65kg Slam Tournament Winner

=== Muay thai ===
- World Professional Muaythai Federation
  - 2007 WPMF World Super featherweight (-60 kg) Championship

=== Awards ===
- 2005 Best Rookie Award (NJKF, January 15, 2006)
- 2005 Gong Kakutogi Magazine Award (NJKF, January 15, 2006)
- 2005 Full Contact Karate Magazine Award (NJKF, January 15, 2006)
- 2006 Technique Award (NJKF, December 23, 2006)
- 2007 Technique Award (NJKF, January 6, 2008)

== Mixed martial arts record ==
Professional record breakdown
| 9 matches | 5 wins | 3 losses |
| By knockout | 2 | 2 |
| By submission | 1 | 0 |
| By decision | 2 | 1 |
| No contests | 1 | |

| Res. | Record | Opponent | Method | Event | Date | Round | Time | Location | Notes |
|---|---|---|---|---|---|---|---|---|---|
| Loss | 5–3 (1) | Razhabali Shaydullaev | TKO (punches) | Rizin Landmark 13 | April 12, 2026 | 1 | 4:13 | Fukuoka, Japan | For the Rizin Featherweight Championship. |
| NC | 5–2 (1) | Karshyga Dautbek | NC (accidental eye poke) | Rizin: Shiwasu no Cho Tsuwamono Matsuri | December 31, 2025 | 1 | 3:15 | Saitama, Japan | Accidental eye poke rendered Dautbek unable to continue. |
| Loss | 5–2 | Razhabali Shaydullaev | TKO (punches) | Rizin 49 | December 31, 2024 | 2 | 2:30 | Saitama, Japan | |
| Win | 5–1 | Yutaka Saito | TKO (front kick to the body) | Super Rizin 3 | July 28, 2024 | 2 | 4:19 | Saitama, Japan | |
| Win | 4–1 | Ryogo Takahashi | Decision (unanimous) | Rizin Landmark 9 | March 23, 2024 | 3 | 5:00 | Kobe, Japan | Return to Featherweight. |
| Win | 3–1 | Rukiya Anpo | Submission (rear-naked choke) | Rizin 45 | December 31, 2023 | 1 | 4:28 | Saitama, Japan | Lightweight debut. Rizin MMA Special rules (2x5 minutes). |
| Win | 2–1 | Takeaki Kinoshita | Decision (split) | Rizin 43 | June 24, 2023 | 3 | 5:00 | Sapporo, Japan | |
| Win | 1–1 | Keisuke Okuda | TKO (elbows and punches) | Rizin Landmark 4 | November 6, 2022 | 1 | 4:43 | Nagoya, Japan | |
| Loss | 0–1 | Shinobu Ota | Decision (unanimous) | Rizin 30 | September 19, 2021 | 3 | 5:00 | Saitama, Japan | Featherweight debut. |

== Kickboxing record ==
Professional kickboxing record
49 Wins (19 (T)KO's), 10 Losses, 2 Draws
| Date | Result | Opponent | Event | Location | Method | Round | Time | Record |
| 2020-03-22 | Win | (Netherlands) Jordann Pikeur | K-1: K’Festa 3 | Saitama, Japan | Decision (Unanimous) | 3 | 3:00 | 49–10–2 |
Defends the K-1 World GP Welterweight (-67.5 kg) Championship.
| 2019-03-10 | Win | (Japan) Yasuhiro Kido | K-1 World GP 2019: K’FESTA 2 | Saitama, Japan | Ext.R Decision (Split) | 4 | 3:00 | 48–10–2 |
Defends the K-1 World GP Welterweight (-67.5 kg) Championship.
| 2018-03-21 | Win | (Armenia) Melsik Baghdasaryan | K-1 World GP 2018: K'FESTA.1 | Saitama, Japan | Decision (Unanimous) | 3 | 3:00 | 47–10–2 |
Defends the K-1 World GP Welterweight (-67.5 kg) Championship.
| 2017-09-18 | Win | (Nepal) Mohan Dragon | K-1 World GP 2016 -67.5kg World Tournament, Final | Tokyo, Japan | Decision (Unanimous) | 3 | 3:00 | 46–10–2 |
Wins the K-1 World GP Welterweight (-67.5 kg) World Grand Prix and K-1 World GP Welterweight (-67.5 kg) Championship.
| 2017-09-18 | Win | (Japan) Hitoshi Tsukakoshi | K-1 World GP 2016 -67.5kg World Tournament, Semi Finals | Tokyo, Japan | TKO (2 Knockdowns) | 1 | 2:36 | 45–10–2 |
| 2017-09-18 | Win | (Brazil) Minoru Kimura | K-1 World GP 2016 -67.5kg World Tournament, Quarter Finals | Tokyo, Japan | Decision (unanimous) | 3 | 3:00 | 44–10–2 |
| 2017-06-04 | Draw | (Japan) Kazuki Yamagiwa | Bigbang 29: Road to Unification | Tokyo, Japan | Decision (Majority) | 3 | 3:00 | 43–10–2 |
| 2017-01-14 | Loss | (China) Xie Lei | Wu Lin Feng World Championship 2017 | Zhengzhou, China | Decision (unanimous) | 3 | 3:00 | 43–10–1 |
| 2016-11-02 | Win | (Japan) Keita Makihira | K-1 World GP in Japan Featherweight Championship Tournament | Tokyo, Japan | Decision (unanimous) | 3 | 3:00 | 43–9–1 |
| 2016-03-04 | Loss | (Japan) Hideaki Yamazaki | K-1 World GP 2016 -65kg Japan Tournament, Semi Finals | Tokyo, Japan | TKO (2 Knockdowns/Hook kick) | 3 | 2:57 | 42–9–1 |
| 2016-03-04 | Win | (Japan) Noman | K-1 World GP 2016 -65kg Japan Tournament, Quarter Finals | Tokyo, Japan | Decision (unanimous) | 3 | 3:00 | 42–8–1 |
| 2015-04-19 | Loss | (Japan) Yasuomi Soda | K-1 World GP 2015 -55kg Championship Tournament | Tokyo, Japan | Decision (unanimous) | 3 | 3:00 | 41–8–1 |
| 2014-11-03 | Loss | (Thailand) Kaew Fairtex | K-1 World GP 2014 -65kg Championship Tournament, Semi Finals | Tokyo, Japan | KO (Right Hook) | 2 | 1:52 | 41–7–1 |
| 2014-11-03 | Win | (Armenia) Raz Sarkisjan | K-1 World GP 2014 -65kg Championship Tournament, Quarter Finals | Tokyo, Japan | Decision (Unanimous) | 3 | 3:00 | 41–6–1 |
| 2013-12-21 | Loss | (Morocco) Mosab Amrani | Glory 13: Tokyo | Tokyo, Japan | Decision (unanimous) | 3 | 3:00 | 40–6–1 |
| 2013-09-01 | Loss | (Japan) Masaaki Noiri | Krush.32 | Nagoya, Japan | Decision (unanimous) | 3 | 3:00 | 40–5–1 |
Lost the Krush Welterweight (-67.5 kg) Championship.
| 2013-05-03 | Win | (Japan) Masaaki Noiri | Glory 8: Tokyo - 65 kg Slam Tournament, Final | Tokyo, Japan | Decision (unanimous) | 3 | 3:00 | 40–4–1 |
Wins the Glory Featherweight (-65kg) Slam Tournament.
| 2013-05-03 | Win | (Canada) Gabriel Varga | Glory 8: Tokyo - 65 kg Slam Tournament, Semi Finals | Tokyo, Japan | Decision (unanimous) | 3 | 3:00 | 39–4–1 |
| 2013-05-03 | Win | (South Korea) Lim Chi-Bin | Glory 8: Tokyo - 65 kg Slam Tournament, Quarter Finals | Tokyo, Japan | KO (body shot) | 2 | 3:00 | 38–4–1 |
| 2013-01-14 | Win | (France) Abdellah Ezbiri | Krush Grand Prix 2013 ~67 kg Tournament~, Final | Tokyo, Japan | 2nd Ext.R Decision (unanimous) | 5 | 3:00 | 37–4–1 |
Wins the Krush Welterweight (-67.5 kg) Grand Prix and the Krush Welterweight (-67.5 kg) Championship.
| 2013-01-14 | Win | (Japan) Shintaro Matsukura | Krush Grand Prix 2013 ~67 kg Tournament~, Semi Finals | Tokyo, Japan | Decision (unanimous) | 3 | 3:00 | 36–4–1 |
| 2013-01-14 | Win | (Japan) TaCa | Krush Grand Prix 2013 ~67 kg Tournament~, Quarter Finals | Tokyo, Japan | KO (body punch) | 2 | 1:43 | 35–4–1 |
| 2012-08-26 | Win | (Japan) Yuya Yamato | Krush.22 | Tokyo, Japan | KO (left high kick) | 2 | 0:51 | 34–4–1 |
| 2012-06-08 | Win | (France) Abdellah Ezbiri | Krush.19 | Tokyo, Japan | Decision (Unanimous) | 3 | 3:00 | 33–4–1 |
| 2012-02-17 | Win | (France) Charles François | Krush.16 | Tokyo, Japan | KO (punch to the body) | 2 | 2:18 | 32–4–1 |
Wins ISKA World Light-Welterweight (64.5kg) Championship.
| 2011-12-31 | Win | (Sweden) Nils Widlund | Fight For Japan: Genki Desu Ka Omisoka 2011 | Saitama, Japan | KO (Right High Kick) | 3 | 1:10 | 31–4–1 |
| 2011-11-12 | Win | (France) Tristan Benard | Krush.13 | Tokyo, Japan | KO (Right Hook) | 3 | 0:52 | 30–4–1 |
| 2011-09-25 | Win | (Germany) Andre Brul | K-1 World MAX 2011 -70kg Japan Tournament Final | Osaka, Japan | Decision (Unanimous) | 3 | 3:00 | 29–4–1 |
| 2011-06-25 | Win | (Japan) Koya Urabe | K-1 World MAX 2011 –63 kg Japan Tournament Final, Final | Shibuya, Tokyo, Japan | Decision (Unanimous) | 3 | 3:00 | 28–4–1 |
Wins the K-1 World MAX Lightweight (-63 kg) Japan Tournament Title.
| 2011-06-25 | Win | (Japan) Masaaki Noiri | K-1 World MAX 2011 –63 kg Japan Tournament Final, Semi-final | Shibuya, Tokyo, Japan | Decision (Unanimous) | 3 | 3:00 | 27–4–1 |
| 2011-06-25 | Win | (Japan) Kizaemon Saiga | K-1 World MAX 2011 –63 kg Japan Tournament Final, Quarter-final | Shibuya, Tokyo, Japan | Decision (Majority) | 3 | 3:00 | 26–4–1 |
| 2011-05-27 | Win | (Thailand) Densiam Lukprabaht | Survivor -Round.7- | Shinjuku, Tokyo, Japan | KO (Left hook) | 3 | 0:53 | 25–4–1 |
| 2010-11-08 | Win | (Japan) Hiroya | K-1 World MAX 2010 -70kg World Championship Tournament Final | Sumida, Tokyo, Japan | Decision (Unanimous) | 3 | 3:00 | 24–4–1 |
| 2010-07-05 | Loss | (Japan) Tetsuya Yamato | K-1 World MAX 2010 -63kg Japan Tournament Final, Final | Shibuya, Tokyo, Japan | KO (Right hook) | 3 | 1:26 | 23–4–1 |
The bout was for K-1 World MAX 2010 -63kg Japan Tournament.
| 2010-07-05 | Win | (Japan) Yoshimichi Matsumoto | K-1 World MAX 2010 –63 kg Japan Tournament Final, Semi-final | Shibuya, Tokyo, Japan | KO (Brazilian kick) | 1 | 1:21 | 23–3–1 |
| 2010-07-05 | Win | (Japan) Keiji Ozaki | K-1 World MAX 2010 –63 kg Japan Tournament Final, Quarter-final | Shibuya, Tokyo, Japan | Decision (Unanimous) | 3 | 3:00 | 22–3–1 |
| 2010-05-02 | Win | (Japan) Taiki Hata | K-1 World MAX 2010 -63kg Japan Tournament Final 16, First Round of 22 | Bunkyō, Tokyo, Japan | Decision (Unanimous) | 3 | 3:00 | 21–3–1 |
| 2010-03-13 | Win | (Japan) Junpei Aotsu | Krush × Survivor | Bunkyō, Tokyo, Japan | Decision (Unanimous) | 3 | 3:00 | 20–3–1 |
| 2009-12-09 | Win | (Japan) Tsuyoshi | M&J Presents Survivor Round.2 | Shinjuku, Tokyo, Japan | Decision (Unanimous) | 3 | 3:00 | 19–3–1 |
| 2009-11-02 | Loss | (Japan) Masahiro Yamamoto | Krush Lightweight GP 2009 -Final Round-, Final | Bunkyō, Tokyo, Japan | Decision (Unanimous) | 3 | 3:00 | 18–3–1 |
For the Krush Lightweight Grand Prix Title.
| 2009-11-02 | Win | (Japan) Yosuke Mizuochi | Krush Lightweight GP 2009 -Final Round-, Reserve match | Bunkyō, Tokyo, Japan | Decision (Majority) | 3 | 3:00 | 18–2–1 |
| 2009-09-28 | Win | (Japan) Takehiro Murahama | M&J Presents Survivor Opening Round.1 | Shinjuku, Tokyo, Japan | KO (Left cross) | 1 | 2:43 | 17–2–1 |
| 2008-04-29 | Draw | (Japan) Takashi Nagatsuka | MAJKF "Break Through - 3" | Kōtō, Tokyo, Japan | Decision (Split) | 5 | 3:00 | 16–2–1 |
For the WMAF World Super featherweight Championship.
| 2008-01-27 | Loss | (Japan) Shunta Ito | NJKF "Start Of New Legend" | Bunkyō, Tokyo, Japan | Decision (Unanimous) | 3 | 3:00 | 16–2 |
| 2007-11-21 | Loss | (Cambodia) Nuang Solia | Removing Land Mines Charity Event | Cambodia | Decision (Unanimous) | 5 | 3:00 | 16–1 |
| 2007-09-02 | Win | (South Korea) Soug-Uk Lee | NJKF "Fighting Evolution VIII -The Next Generation-" | Bunkyō, Tokyo, Japan | KO (Left knee shot) | 3 | 2:55 | 16–0 |
| 2007-07-13 | Win | (Thailand) Chaichana Patong Gym | World Muay Thai Federation Championship | Phuket, Thailand | KO (Right knee strike) | 5 | | 15–0 |
Wins vacant title of WPMO World Super featherweight Championship.
| 2007-05-13 | Win | (Thailand) Farkamwang SKV Gym | NJKF "Fighting Evolution VI" | Kōtō, Tokyo, Japan | Decision (Majority) | 5 | 3:00 | 14–0 |
| 2007-03-18 | Win | (Japan) Nobuhiro Iwai | NJKF "Fighting Evolution III -3 Kings Champion Carnival-" | Bunkyō, Tokyo, Japan | TKO (Cut) | 2 | 1:43 | 13–0 |
Wins the NJKF Featherweight Championship.
| 2007-01-28 | Win | (South Africa) Daniel Mashamaite | NJKF "Fighting Evolution II -Muay Thai Open-" | Kōtō, Tokyo, Japan | Decision (Unanimous) | 3 | 3:00 | 12–0 |
| 2006-12-05 | Win | (Thailand) Somdet Por.Pantie | Thai King's Birthday | Sanam Luang, Thailand | KO (Knee shot) | 4 | | 11–0 |
On November 1, 2011, Kubo was sanctioned as the interim NJKF featherweight champion as Nobuhiro Iwai's title had been vacated due to injury.
| 2006-09-16 | Win | (Thailand) Kenpeth Sitnongchai | Rajadamnern Stadium | Bangkok, Thailand | KO | 3 | | 10–0 |
| 2006-09-10 | Win | (Thailand) Nichau Sithaikeriangtor | Rajadamnern Stadium | Bangkok, Thailand | TKO | 3 | | 9–0 |
| 2006-05-03 | Win | (Japan) Masato Ōkawa | NJKF "Advance IV" | Bunkyō, Tokyo, Japan | Decision (Unanimous) | 5 | 3:00 | 8–0 |
NJKF Featherweight Championship eliminator.
| 2006-03-05 | Win | (Japan) Shōgo Kokubun | NJKF "Advance II" | Bunkyō, Tokyo, Japan | Decision (Unanimous) | 5 | 3:00 | 7–0 |
| 2005-11-20 | Win | (Japan) Yoshiaki Takano | NJKF "Infinite Challenge X" | Bunkyō, Tokyo, Japan | TKO (Corner stoppage) | 4 | 2:05 | 6–0 |
| 2005-09-24 | Win | (Japan) Shōkō | NJKF "Infinite Challenge VIII" | Bunkyō, Tokyo, Japan | KO (Left high kick) | 1 | 2:52 | 5–0 |
| 2005-07-23 | Win | (Japan) Kozaru | NJKF "Infinite Challenge VII" | Bunkyō, Tokyo, Japan | KO | 3 | 1:56 | 4–0 |
| 2005-05-03 | Win | (Japan) Hiuma | NJKF "Infinite Challenge IV" | Bunkyō, Tokyo, Japan | Decision (Unanimous) | 3 | 3:00 | 3–0 |
| 2005-03-12 | Win | (Japan) Thriller Hideo | NJKF "Infinite Challenge II" | Bunkyō, Tokyo, Japan | Decision (Unanimous) | 3 | 3:00 | 2–0 |
| 2005-01-22 | Win | (Japan) Shinji Aseishi | NJKF "Infinite Challenge I" | Bunkyō, Tokyo, Japan | Decision (Unanimous) | 3 | 3:00 | 1–0 |
Legend: Win Loss Draw/No contest Notes

== See also ==
- List of male kickboxers
- List of Krush champions
- List of K-1 champions

Sporting positions
| Preceded by Inaugural | Krush Welterweight Champion; January 14, 2013–September 1, 2013 | Succeeded by Masaaki Noiri |
| Preceded by Inaugural | K-1 World GP Welterweight Champion; September 18, 2017–August 20, 2020; Vacated | Succeeded by Masaaki Noiri |
