= Yuki (kickboxer) =

Japanese kickboxer

- Born: Yuki Taguchi; November 6, 1982 (age 43); Fukuoka, Japan
- Other names: Mr. RISE
- Height: 170 cm (5 ft 7 in)
- Weight: 61 kg (134 lb; 9.6 st)
- Division: Flyweight
- Style: Kickboxing
- Stance: Orthodox
- Fighting out of: Tokyo, Japan
- Team: ANCHOR GYM

Kickboxing record
- Total: 61
- Wins: 30
- By knockout: 15
- Losses: 30
- By knockout: 11
- Draws: 1

Yuki Taguchi (裕樹), popularly known as Yuki, is a retired Japanese kickboxer, who competed professionally from 2003 until 2020. He is the former RISE Super Lightweight and Lightweight champion and Super Featherweight champion. Nicknamed "Mr. RISE", he was one of RISE's most notable fighters, having fought a grand total of 37 times with the organization. As of December 2012 he was ranked the #4 lightweight kickboxer in the world by Liverkick.

== Kickboxing career ==
Yuki made his professional debut in November 2003, with a low kick KO victory over Takayuki Nishimoto. Over the next five years, Yuki amassed a 10-8 record, finishing as a runner-up in the 2004 RISE Dead or Alive Tournament. In July 2008, at RISE 48, Yuki challenged Yuji Takeuchi for the RISE Lightweight title. He won the fight by a fourth round TKO.

Yuki was scheduled to defend his title for the first time against Kan Itabashi at RISE 52. He failed to defend his title, as Itabashi won the fight by unanimous decision.

Following this loss, Yuki went on a 5-2 run, earning himself another chance to fight for the RISE Lightweight title, as he challenged the incumbent champion Koji Yoshimoto. Yuki won the fight by a second round TKO. He was scheduled to defend his title against Yuto Watanabe at RISE 87. Yuki defeated Watanabe by a majority decision. He fought Lee Sung-hyun at RISE 91, but failed to defend for the second time, as Lee won the fight by a fourth round TKO.

Following this loss, Yuki took part in the 2013 Road to Glory Japan 65 kg Tournament. He won a unanimous decision against Mohan Dragon in the quarterfinals, and defeated Zen Fujita by TKO in the semifinals. He failed to capture the tournament however, as he suffered a TKO loss at the hands of Masaaki Noiri in the finals.

He next participated in the 2013 SHOOT BOXING 65 kg S-Cup. He beat Seiji Takahashi by TKO in the quarterfinals, but dropped a decision to Hiroaki Suzuki in the semifinals.

At RISE 97, he fought in a RISE Lightweight title eliminator tournament, being scheduled to fight Tatsuaki in the semifinals. He beat him by unanimous decision, but lost a majority decision to Shohei Asahara in the finals.

In September 2014, at RISE 101, Yuki fought Naoki for the RISE Super Lightweight title. He won the fight by unanimous decision.

Yuki fought 13 times in the next five years, going on a 5-7-1 run. In November 2020, for his retirement fight, Yuki requested a fight with the RISE Featherweight champion Tenshin Nasukawa. His request granted, the two of them met at the RISE DEAD OR ALIVE 2020 Osaka event. Nasukawa dominated the fight, knocking Yuki down once in the first round, and three times in the second fight before the referee was forced to stop the bout.

== Titles and accomplishments ==
- RISE
  - 2014 RISE Super Lightweight champion
  - 2010 RISE Lightweight champion
  - 2008 RISE Super Featherweight champion
  - 2004 RISE Dead or Alive Tournament runner-up

== Professional kickboxing record ==
Professional Kickboxing Record
30 Wins (15 (T)KO's), 30 Losses, 1 Draw, 0 No Contest
Date	Result	Opponent	Event	Location	Method	Round	Time
2025-11-02	Loss	(Japan) Daiki Toita	RISE World Series 2025 Final	Tokyo, Japan	KO (Right cross)	2	2:44
2025-06-21	Loss	(Japan) Tomohiro Kitai	RISE WORLD SERIES 2025 Yokohama	Yokohama, Japan	Decision (Unanimous)	3	3:00
2020-11-01	Loss	(Japan) Tenshin Nasukawa	RISE DEAD OR ALIVE 2020 Osaka	Osaka, Japan	TKO (3 Knockdowns/Flying knee)	2	2:56
2019-07-21	Loss	(Brazil) Hector Santiago	Rise World Series 2019, Semi Final	Osaka, Japan	Decision (Unanimous)	3	3:00
2019-03-10	Loss	(Korea) Chan Hyung Lee	Rise World Series 2019, First Round	Tokyo, Japan	Decision	3	3:00
2018-11-17	Loss	(Thailand) Rodtang Jitmuangnon	RISE 129	Tokyo, Japan	Decision (Unanimous)	3	3:00
2018-06-16	Win	(Japan) Koudai Nobe	RISE 125	Tokyo, Japan	KO (low kick)	4	1:20
2018-02-25	Win	(Japan) Yuto Tsujide	HOOST CUP KINGS KYOTO 4	Kyoto, Japan	Ext.R Decision (Unanimous)	4	3:00
2017-10-15	Draw	(Japan) Darvish Kuroki	Rizin World Grand Prix 2017: Opening Round - Part 2	Fukuoka, Japan	Decision	3	3:00
2017-07-17	Loss	(Korea) Chan Hyung Lee	RISE 118	Tokyo, Japan	TKO (3 Knockdowns)	2	2:58
2017-01-28	Ex	(Japan) Koudai Nobe	RISE 115	Tokyo, Japan	Exhibition	2	3:00
2016-10-02	Win	(Netherlands) Ilias El Hajoui	HOOST CUP KINGS OSAKA	Osaka, Japan	KO (Left Low Kick)	3	1:54
2016-06-01	Loss	(Netherlands) Pietro Doorje	REBELS.43	Tokyo, Japan	Decision (Split)	3	3:00
2016-03-26	Loss	(Japan) Hiroaki Suzuki	RISE 110	Tokyo, Japan	Decision (Majority)	3	3:00
2015-11-29	Win	(Netherlands) Joury Smans	HOOST CUP KINGS WEST 2	Osaka, Japan	Decision (Majority)	3	3:00
2015-05-31	Loss	(Netherlands) Zakaria Zouggary	RISE 105	Tokyo, Japan	TKO (Flying Knee)	2	2:04
2014-12-29	Win	(Japan) Toshiki Taniyama	BLADE 1 -BLADE FIGHTING CHAMPIONSHIP-	Tokyo, Japan	Ext.R Decision (Split)	4	3:00
2014-09-28	Win	(Japan) Naoki	RISE 101	Tokyo, Japan	Decision (Unanimous)	5	3:00
Wins the RISE Super Lightweight title.
2014-02-23	Loss	(Japan) MASAYA	SHOOT BOXING 2014 act.1	Tokyo, Japan	Decision (Unanimous)	3	3:00
2014-01-25	Loss	(Japan) Shohei Asahara	RISE 97 – 63 kg Next Challenger Tournament, Final	Tokyo, Japan	Decision (Majority)	3	3:00
2014-01-25	Win	(Japan) Tatsuaki	RISE 97 – 63 kg Next Challenger Tournament, Semifinals	Tokyo, Japan	Decision (Unanimous)	3	3:00
2013-11-16	Loss	(Japan) Hiroaki Suzuki	SHOOT BOXING BATTLE SUMMIT GROUND ZERO TOKYO 2013 - S-cup 65 kg Japan Tournament, Semifinals	Tokyo, Japan	Decision (Unanimous)	3	3:00
2013-11-16	Win	(Japan) Seiji Takahashi	SHOOT BOXING BATTLE SUMMIT GROUND ZERO TOKYO 2013 - S-cup 65 kg Japan Tournament, Quarterfinals	Tokyo, Japan	TKO (2 Knockdowns)	1	1:07
2013-06-09	Loss	(Japan) Kosuke Komiyama	RISE 93	Tokyo, Japan	Decision (Majority)	3	3:00
2013-03-10	Loss	(Japan) Masaaki Noiri	Road to Glory Japan 65 kg Tournament, Final	Tokyo, Japan	TKO (4 Knockdowns)	2	1:35
For the Road to Glory Japan 65kg Tournament.
2013-03-10	Win	(Japan) Zen Fujita	Road to Glory Japan 65 kg Tournament, Semi Final	Tokyo, Japan	TKO (2 Knockdowns)	2	2:42
2013-03-10	Win	(Nepal) Mohan Dragon	Road to Glory Japan 65 kg Tournament, Quarter Final	Tokyo, Japan	Decision (Unanimous)	3	3:00
2012-10-25	Loss	(Korea) Lee Sung-hyun	RISE 91/M-1MC INFINITY.II	Japan	TKO (3 Knockdowns)	4	1:58
Loses the RISE Lightweight Title.
2012-10-25	Win	(Spain) Javier Hernández	RISE 90	Japan	KO (low kick)	2	2:03
2012-06-22	Loss	(Korea) Lee Sung-hyun	RISE 88	Japan	Decision (Majority)	3	3:00
2012-03-24	Win	(Japan) Yuto Watanabe	RISE 87	Japan	Decision (Majority)	5	3:00
Defends the RISE Lightweight Title.
2011-06-25	Loss	(Japan) Koya Urabe	K-1 World MAX 2011 –63 kg Japan Tournament Final, Quarter Finals	Tokyo, Japan	Decision (Majority)	3	3:00
2010-12-19	Win	(Japan) Koji Yoshimoto	RISE 73	Japan	TKO (Low Kicks)	2	2:09
Wins the RISE Lightweight Title.
2010-10-03	Win	(Japan) Naoki	RISE 71	Japan	Ext.R Decision (Unanimous)	4	3:00
2010-07-05	Loss	(Japan) Tetsuya Yamato	K-1 World MAX 2010 –63 kg Japan Tournament, Quarter-final	Shibuya, Tokyo, Japan	KO (Left hook)	1	3:03
2010-05-02	Win	(Japan) Yuji Takeuchi	K-1 World MAX 2010 –63 kg Japan Tournament, 1st round	Japan	KO (High Kick)	2	1:53
2010-01-24	Win	(Japan) Shunsuke Oishi	RISE 61	Japan	Ext.R Decision (Unanimous)	4	3:00
2009-12-12	Win	(Japan) Masato Oishi	BATTLE EVENT REALDEAL 14	Japan	KO (Left Hook)	1	2:44
2009-07-26	Win	(Japan) Shoji	RISE 57	Tokyo, Japan	KO (Left Low Kick)	3	0:48
2009-04-21	Loss	(Japan) Masahiro Yamamoto	K-1 World MAX 2009 World Championship Tournament Final 16	Fukuoka, Japan	Decision (unanimous)	3	3:00
2009-01-31	Loss	(Japan) Kan Itabashi	RISE 52	Japan	Decision (Unanimous)	5	3:00
Loses the RISE Super Featherweight Title.
2008-11-30	Loss	(Japan) TURBO	RISE 51	Japan	Ext.R Decision (Unanimous)	4	3:00
2008-07-04	Win	(Japan) Yuji Takeuchi	RISE 48 THE KING OF GLADIATORs’08	Japan	TKO (Low Kick)	4	1:15
Wins the RISE Super Featherweight Title.
2008-05-11	Win	(Japan) Fire Harada	KGS R.I.S.E.46 ～THE KING OF GLADIATORs’08	Japan	KO (Right Low Kick)	1	2:42
2007-12-16	Loss	(Japan) Yusuke Ikei	R.I.S.E. DEAD OR ALIVE TOURNAMENT’07, Quarter Finals	Japan	KO (Left Knee to the Head)	2	0:25
2007-10-28	Win	(Japan) Hideki Mizutani	R.I.S.E.-β- “L7	Japan	Decision (Unanimous)	3	3:00
2007-08-26	Win	(Korea) Fan Jin Son	R.I.S.E.-α- “THE FACE”	Japan	Decision (Unanimous)	3	3:00
2007-06-17	Loss	(Japan) HAYATO	R.I.S.E. FLASH to CRUSH TOURNAMENT’07	Japan	Decision (Unanimous)	3	3:00
2007-04-12	Loss	(Japan) Takashi Ohno	R.I.S.E. FIREBALL 1	Japan	Decision (Majority)	3	3:00
2006-12-17	Loss	(Japan) Keiji Ozaki	R.I.S.E. DEAD OR ALIVE TOURNAMENT’06, Semi Final	Japan	TKO (Left Low Kick)	2	1:58
2006-12-17	Win	(Japan) Tomo Kiire	R.I.S.E. DEAD OR ALIVE TOURNAMENT’06, Quarter Final	Japan	Decision (Unanimous)	3	3:00
2006-09-24	Win	(Japan) Takehiro Murahama	R.I.S.E. MIGHTY EIGHTY TOURNAMENT’06	Japan	Decision (Unanimous)	3	3:00
2005-07-31	Loss	(Japan) Keiji Ozaki	R.I.S.E. 27	Japan	TKO (Corner Stoppage)	2	0:43
2005-03-12	Win	(Japan) Kenshi	IKUSA YGZ04 ～BIRD-BASE～	Japan	KO (Low Kick)	3	1:26
2004-12-19	Loss	(Japan) Koichi Kikuchi	R.I.S.E. DEAD OR ALIVE TOURNAMENT 04, Final	Japan	TKO (Low Kicks)	1	2:26
For the 2004 RISE Dead or Alive Tournament Title.
2004-12-19	Win	(Japan) Yasuhito Shirasu	R.I.S.E. DEAD OR ALIVE TOURNAMENT 04, Semi Final	Japan	Decision (Unanimous)	3	3:00
2004-12-19	Win	(Japan) Masaru Abe	R.I.S.E. DEAD OR ALIVE TOURNAMENT 04, Quarter Final	Japan	KO (Low Kicks)	3	1:55
2004-09-26	Win	(Japan) Ken	R.I.S.E. 9	Japan	TKO (Low Kicks)	2	0:42
2004-06-04	Loss	(Japan) Koichi Sakuchi	Shoot Boxing ∞-S – Infinity-S – vol 3	Japan	Decision (Unanimous)	5	3:00
2004-04-29	Win	(Japan) A.KAMINE	R.I.S.E. VII	Japan	Ext.R Decision (Unanimous)	4	3:00
2004-01-24	Loss	(Japan) Hiroki Shishido	Ikusa "Future Fighter Ikusa 5 -Ran- Monkey Magic"	Tokyo, Japan	Decision (Unanimous)	3	3:00
2003-11-16	Win	(Japan) Takayuki Nishimoto	IKUSA「Young Gunners 2」	Tokyo, Japan	KO (Low Kick)	3	0:49
Legend: Win Loss Draw/No contest Notes

== See also ==
- List of male kickboxers
