= Yuya Yamamoto =

Japanese martial artist

- Born: Yutaka Wataru Yamamoto; July 15, 1984 (age 42); Onomichi, Hiroshima, Japan
- Native name: 山本 優弥
- Nationality: Japanese
- Height: 1.75 m (5 ft 9 in)
- Weight: 70 kg (154 lb; 11 st 0 lb)
- Division: Welterweight
- Style: Karate
- Team: Seishun Juku
- Rank: black belt in Shin Karate
- Years active: 2001 - 2015

Kickboxing record
- Total: 60
- Wins: 34
- By knockout: 13
- Losses: 25
- By knockout: 7
- Draws: 1

Other information
- University: Hiroshima Preféctural; Matsunaga High School
- Last updated on: May 12, 2013

Yuya Yamamoto (山本 優弥, Yamamoto Yūya; born July 15, 1984) is a retired Japanese kickboxer who competed in K-1 at middleweight (-70 kg). He is the former Japanese national champion of kickboxing sanctioned by All Japan Kickboxing Federation at welterweight.

== Biography ==
=== Amateur era ===
Yuya Yamamoto was born in Takasu, Onomichi in Hiroshima, Japan on July 15, 1984. He started learning karate at Kushukaikan during his high school life. Although he was only 16 years old, he won the All Japan Shin Karate championships at lightweight. After winning the championship, he moved to Tokyo and joined Booch Beat, a kickboxing team, to be a kickboxer. On September 7, 2001, he debuted as a professional kickboxer for All Japan Kickboxing Federation(AJKF). At this time, he was only 17 years old.

=== Professional kickboxing ===
In 2004, Yamamoto challenged Yamauchi's welterweight championship on January 4, but he was defeated by the unanimous decision at 5R. On November 19, he challenged Yamauchi's title again, but he failed to win the title because the match resulted as a draw. In January 2006, he moved to Seishunjuku from Booch Beat.

On February 6, 2005, he fought against Yoshihiro Sato. He was beaten completely as he was knocked down 6 times during the bout of 5R. Sato knocked down Yamamoto twice at 1R, twice at 2R, once at 3R, once at 4R. Yamamoto was going to be retired before fighting against Sato. For this reason, although he was offered only 10 days before, he accepted this bout as a replacement. Although he intended to retire, this bout was evaluated by K-1; thereafter, he decided to continue his career.

In 2007, he participated the tournament for the vacant welterweight championship of AJKF. He won the tournament on May 11, 2007, and 23rd champion of AJKF at welterweight. On December 28, 2007, AJKF announced that Yamamoto is going to be awarded "2007 Outstanding Performance Award" as he won the title and he beat Keiji Ozaki in October. He was awarded on January 12, 2008.

On December 5, 2008, he fought against Christophe Pruvost from Switzerland for his AJKF Welterweight title, but he was beaten by TKO by cut and he lost his title.

Yamamoto lost to Xu Yan by TKO at Krush.16 in Tokyo, Japan on February 17, 2012.

Yamamoto competed in the Krush Grand Prix 2013 ~67kg First Class Tournament~ on January 14, 2012, in Tokyo. In the quarter-finals, he went up against Hitoshi Tsukagoshi, a quick former 63 kg fighter. Yamamoto's power was too much for Tsukagoshi, however, and he knocked him out with a brutal left hook in round three. He then lost a split decision after taking Abdellah Ezbiri into an extension round in the semis. He lost to TaCa via unanimous decision after an extension round at Krush.28 in Tokyo, Japan on May 12, 2013.

He snapped the losing skid with a split decision win over Onder Ural at Krush 31. This victory was followed up by a three fight losing streak, during which he lost by decision to Makihira Keita, Kerrith Bhella and by knockout to Kotetsu.

== Titles and accomplishments ==
=== Amateur ===
  - 2001 All Japan Shin Karate Championship K-2 Tournament Lightweight winner

=== Professional ===
- K-1
  - 2009 K-1 World MAX Japan Tournament Runner Up
  - 2011 K-1 World MAX Japan Tournament Runner Up
- All Japan Kickboxing Federation
  - AJKF Welterweight champion

=== Awards ===
- 2007 AJKF Outstanding Performance Award

== Kickboxing record ==
Kickboxing record
35 Wins (13 (T)KO's, 28 Losses, 1 Draw
Date	Result	Opponent	Event	Location	Method	Round	Time
2015-02-06	Loss	(Japan) Kotetsu	Krush.51	Tokyo, Japan	KO (Left Jab)	1	0:41
2014-11-03	Loss	(United Kingdom) Kerrith Bhella	K-1 World GP 2014 -65kg Championship Tournament	Shibuya, Tokyo, Japan	Decision (majority)	3	3:00
2014-04-15	Loss	(Japan) Makihira Keita	Krush.40	Tokyo, Japan	Ext.R Decision (unanimous)	4	3:00
2013-08-25	win	(Turkey) Onder Ural	Krush.31	Hiroshima, Japan	Decision (Split)	3	3:00
2013-05-12	Loss	(Japan) TaCa	Krush.28	Tokyo, Japan	Ext.R Decision (unanimous)	4	3:00
2013-01-14	Loss	(France) Abdellah Ezbiri	Krush Grand Prix 2013 ~67 kg Tournament~, Semi Finals	Tokyo, Japan	Ext.R Decision (split)	4	3:00
2013-01-14	Win	(Japan) Hitoshi Tsukakoshi	Krush Grand Prix 2013 ~67 kg Tournament~, Quarter Finals	Tokyo, Japan	KO (left hook)	3	1:59
2012-07-21	Loss	(Japan) Asami Zaurus	Krush.20	Tokyo, Japan	Decision (Unanimous)	3	3:00
2012-02-17	Loss	(China) Xu Yan	Krush.16	Tokyo, Japan	TKO (referee stoppage)	2	1:39
2011-09-25	Loss	(Japan) Yūji Nashiro	K-1 World MAX 2011 –70 kg Japan Tournament Final	Osaka, Japan	KO (punches)	1	3:00
For K-1 World MAX 2011 Japan Tournament Title.
2011-09-25	Win	(Japan) Kenta	K-1 World MAX 2011 –70 kg Japan Tournament Semi Final	Osaka, Japan	Ext.R Decision (Unanimous)	4	3:00
2011-09-25	Win	(Japan) Shintaro Matsukura	K-1 World MAX 2011 –70 kg Japan Tournament Quarter Final	Osaka, Japan	Decision (Unanimous)	3	3:00
2011-05-29	Loss	(Japan) Shintaro Matsukura	Krush -70 kg The First Championship Tournament 1st Round	Tokyo, Japan	Decision (Unanimous)	3	3:00
Fails to qualify for Krush tournament semi finals -70 kg.
2011-04-30	Win	(Japan) Akihiro Gono	Krush The First Championship Tournament ~Triple Final Round~	Tokyo, Japan	Decision (Unanimous)	3	3:00
2011-01-09	Win	(Japan) Masakazu Watanabe	Krush First Generation Kings Tournament Round 2, Super Fight	Tokyo, Japan	KO (Punches)	2	2:16
2010-11-08	Win	(Japan) Seiichi Ikemoto	K-1 World MAX 2010 -70kg World Championship Tournament Final	Tokyo, Japan	KO (Punches)	2	2:22
2010-07-05	Loss	(Japan) Yoshihiro Sato	K-1 World MAX 2010 Final 16 - Part 1	Tokyo, Japan	Decision (Majority)	3	3:00
Fails to qualify for K-1 World MAX 2010 Final.
2010-04-29	Win	(United States) Scott Shaffer	Krush 6	Tokyo, Japan	KO (High kick)	3	1:59
2010-03-27	Loss	(Japan) Hinata Watanabe	K-1 World MAX 2010 –70 kg Japan Tournament	Saitama, Japan	Decision (Unanimous)	3	3:00
2009-10-26	Loss	(Italy) Giorgio Petrosyan	K-1 World MAX 2009 Final	Yokohama, Japan	KO (Right hook)	1	2:09
2009-07-13	Win	(Armenia) Gago Drago	K-1 World MAX 2009 Final 8	Tokyo, Japan	Decision (Unanimous)	3	3:00
2009-04-21	Win	(South Korea) Chi Bin Lim	K-1 World MAX 2009 Final 16	Fukuoka, Japan	Decision (Unanimous)	3	3:00
2009-02-23	Loss	(Japan) Taishin Kohiruimaki	K-1 World MAX 2009 Japan Tournament	Tokyo, Japan	Decision (Unanimous)	3	3:00
For K-1 World MAX 2009 Japan Tournament Title.
2009-02-23	Win	(Japan) Yuichiro Nagashima	K-1 World MAX 2009 Japan Tournament	Tokyo, Japan	TKO (Doctor stoppage/cut)	3	0:59
2009-02-23	Win	(Japan) Tatsuji	K-1 World MAX 2009 Japan Tournament	Tokyo, Japan	Ext. R Decision (Unanimous)	4	3:00
2008-12-05	Loss	(Switzerland) Christophe Pruvost	All Japan Kickboxing Federation	Tokyo, Japan	TKO (Doctor stop./cut)	4	2:59
Loses his AJKF Welterweight championship title.
2008-11-08	Win	(Korea) Kwon Min Seok	AJKF "Krush! 〜Kickboxing Destruction〜"	Tokyo, Japan	Decision (Unanimous)	3	3:00
2008-09-19	Loss	(Thailand) Samranchai 96Penang	AJKF "SWORD FIGHT 2008 〜Japan VS Thailand 5vs5 Match〜"	Tokyo, Japan	TKO (Doctor Stoppage)	3	2:25
2008-06-22	Loss	(Thailand) Samkor Kiatmontep	AJKF Norainu Dengekisakusen	Tokyo, Japan	Decision (Split)	5	3:00
2008-04-09	Win	(Brazil) Marfio Canoletti	K-1 World MAX 2008 Final 16	Hiroshima, Japan	Decision (Unanimous)	3	3:00
2008-02-02	Loss	(Nigeria) Andy Ologun	K-1 World MAX 2008 Japan Tournament	Tokyo, Japan	Decision (Unanimous)	3	3:00
2007-10-25	Win	(Japan) Ryuji Horio	AJKF Kick Return/Kickboxer of the best 60 kg Tournament Final	Tokyo, Japan	Decision (Majority)	3	3:00
2007-07-29	Win	(Netherlands) Jimmy Emmers	AJKF "Super Fight 2007"	Tokyo, Japan	Decision (Unanimous)	5	3:00
2007-05-11	Win	(Japan) Mitsumasa Horikawa	AJKF "REARM" AJKF Welterweight tournament, Final	Bunkyo, Tokyo, Japan	Decision (Majority)	5	3:00
Wins vacant title of AJKF Welterweight championship.
2007-03-09	Win	(Japan) Kin Tokou	AJKF Departure 〜Norainu FINAL〜 Welterweight Championship Tournament, Semi Final	Tokyo, Japan	TKO (Doctor Stoppage)	2	1:23
2006-12-08	Loss	(Japan) Kazki Hamasaki	AJKF "Fujihara Matsuri 2006"	Tokyo, Japan	Ext.R Decision (Unanimous)	4	3:00
2006-10-08	Win	(Japan) Takayuki Weerasakreck	AJKF "Seishun Matsuri 〜Naokick's〜"	Tokyo, Japan	TKO (Doctor Stoppage)	2	1:23
2006-09-04	Loss	(France) Farid Khider	K-1 World MAX 2006 Champions Challenge	Yokohama, Japan	Decision (Majority)	3	3:00
2006-02-04	Loss	(Japan) Tatsuji	K-1 World MAX 2006 Japan Tournament	Saitama, Japan	TKO (Injury, dislocated shoulder)	2	2:47
2005-11-19	Loss	(France) Yassine Benhadj	Janus Fight Night 2005, Quarter Finals	Italy	Decision	3	3:00
2005-10-12	Win	(Japan) Ash-Ra	K-1 World MAX 2005 Champions Challenge	Tokyo, Japan	Decision (Unanimous)	3	3:00
2005-09-16	Win	(Japan) Hiroyuki Abe	AJKF "STACK OF ARMS"	Tokyo, Japan	KO (Knee)	2	2:16
2005-06-14	Loss	(Japan) Kazuki Hamasaki	K-1 World Grand Prix 2005 in Hiroshima	Hiroshima, Japan	TKO	2	2:20
2005-05-04	Win	(Japan) Yasuhiro Kido	K-1 World MAX 2005 World Tournament Open	Tokyo, Japan	Decision (Unanimous)	3	3:00
2005-04-17	Win	(Switzerland) Mirko Kuhn	AJKF "NEVER GIVE UP"	Tokyo, Japan	KO (3 Knockdowns)	3	1:25
2005-02-06	Loss	(Japan) Yoshihiro Sato	All Japan Kickboxing 2005: Moving	Japan	Decision (Unanimous)	5	3:00
2004-11-19	Draw	(Japan) Yutaro Yamauchi	AJKF "The Championship"	Tokyo, Japan	Decision (Unanimous)	5	3:00
For the AJKF Welterweight title.
2004-09-23	Win	(Japan) Hiroyuki Takaya	All Japan Kickboxing 2004: Danger Zone	Tokyo, Japan	Decision (Unanimous)	3	3:00
2004-07-24	Win	(Italy) Mikel Sanchi	AJKF "SUPER FIGHT 〜MAXIMAM〜"	Tokyo, Japan	Decision (Unanimous)	5	3:00
2004-05-16	Win	(Belgium) Javier	AJKF "Fire Wire"	Tokyo, Japan	KO (Right Hook)	3	0:53
2004-04-16	Win	(Japan) Hisayuki Kanazawa	AJKF All Japan Lightweight Tournament 2004 2nd.STAGE	Tokyo, Japan	Decision (Majority)	3	3:00
2004-01-04	Loss	(Japan) Yutaro Yamauchi	All Japan Kickboxing 2004: Wilderness	Tokyo, Japan	Decision (Majority)	5	3:00
For the AJKF Welterweight title.
2003-11-23	Win	(Japan) Masaaki Kato	All Japan Kickboxing 2003: Scramble	Tokyo, Japan	KO (Strikes)	1	0:58
2003-09-27	Win	(Japan) Tomohiro Chiba	AJKF "KNOCK DOWN"	Tokyo, Japan	KO (3 Knockdows)	3	2:46
2003-07-20	Win	(Japan) Takaya Komatsu	AJKF "KICK OUT"	Tokyo, Japan	Decision (Unanimous)	3	3:00
2003-05-23	Loss	(Japan) Takahito Fujimaki	AJKF	Tokyo, Japan	Decision (Split)	3	3:00
2003-03-08	Loss	(Mongolia) Tsogto Amara	All Japan Lightweight Strongest Decision Tournament	Tokyo, Japan	Ext. R Decision (Unanimous)	5	3:00
2002-12-01	Loss	(Korea) Lim Chi-bin	龍PROMOTION I.K.M.F. Korea - Japan 4VS4 Match	South Korea	Decision	5	3:00
2002-09	Win	(Thailand)		Thailand	KO		
2002-05-30	Win	(Japan) Yuji Kitano	AJKF "VANGUARD"	Tokyo, Japan	Decision (Majority)	3	3:00
2002-02-15	Win	(Japan) Makoto Hasegawa	AJKF	Tokyo, Japan	Decision (Unanimous)	3	3:00
2001-10-12	Loss	(Japan) Takahito Fujimaki	AJKF Lightning All Japan Lightweight Tournament Semi Finals	Tokyo, Japan	Decision (Majority)	3	3:00
2001-09-07	Win	(Japan) Taku Harada	AJKF Lightning All Japan Lightweight Tournament Quarter Finals	Tokyo, Japan	Decision (Unanimous)	3	3:00
Legend: Win Loss Draw/No contest Notes

== See also ==
- List of K-1 events
- List of male kickboxers
