= Keiji Ozaki =

Japanese kickboxer (b. 1980)

- 尾崎圭司
- Born: April 24, 1980 (age 46); Kanagawa, Japan
- Education: Kanagawa University
- Martial arts career
- Other names: Tornado Star; Taekwondo Dragon
- Height: 1.69 m (5 ft 7 in)
- Weight: 70 kg (150 lb; 11 st)
- Division: Lightweight; Welterweight
- Style: Taekwondo, Kickboxing
- Fighting out of: Tokyo, Japan
- Team: Team Dragon
- Trainer: Kensaku Maeda
- Rank: 2nd dan black belt in Taekwondo
- Years active: 2003-present

Kickboxing record
- Total: 45
- Wins: 26
- By knockout: 8
- Losses: 18
- By knockout: 2
- Draws: 1
- No contests: 0
- Ozaki's strict style is Full contact Taekwondo. Last updated on: January 14, 2013

Japanese name
- Kanji: 尾崎圭司
- Hiragana: おざき けいじ
- Katakana: オザキ ケイジ
Transcriptions
- Romanization: Ozaki Keiji

Keiji Ozaki (尾崎圭司, Ozaki Keiji; born April 24, 1980) is a Japanese former professional kickboxer and taekwondo-in. He won the tournament of R.I.S.E. at welterweight in 2006. As a martial artist, he practices the full-contact version of taekwondo, and has competed in numerous competitions.

== Early life ==
Ozaki was born April 24, 1980, in the prefecture of Kanagawa. He spent part of his upbringing in the United States, in Murrysville, Pennsylvania. He attended Keio Academy of New York and Kanagawa Prefectural Tsuruma High School, where he practiced finswimming. He participated in the Japanese national championship of swimming for 5 different disciplines in 1999, and he won 5 gold medals at 5 disciplines. After graduation of high school, he entered Kanagawa University to study business administration, and he joined its taekwondo team.

== Taekwondo competitor ==
In 2000, he won the gold medal of Japanese national championship for undergraduates in full contact taekwondo at open weight. In 2002 and 2003, he won the national championships for adults.

His he is a 2nd dan black belt certified by the Japan Taekwondo Association.

== Kickboxing career ==
In March 2000, he joined Team Dragon and started practicing kickboxing. On September 28, 2003, he debuted on R.I.S.E., one of the kickboxing promoting and sanctioning body, as a professional kickboxer. He fought against Tomoaki Suehiro, and won by unanimous decision.

On December 17, 2006, he won the "R.I.S.E. Dead or Alive tournament '06".

=== K-1 ===
Ozaki was offered by K-1, and he participated K-1 to prove the strength of taekwondo.

He defeated Masanobu Goto by a clear unanimous decision at Krush-EX 2012 vol.5 on October 21, 2012, at Shinjuki Face in Tokyo. He floored Goto four times in the fight.

He lost to Jessy Petit-Jean in a fight for the WKN World Lightweight Kickboxing Championship on November 17, 2012, in Liège, Belgium.

He lost a majority decision to Hiroya in a non-tournament bout at Krush Grand Prix 2013 ~67kg Tournament First Round~ on January 14, 2013, in Tokyo.

Ozaki faced fellow taekwondo stylist Seiji Takahashi at NJKF: 2013 3rd in Tokyo on April 29, 2013.

Since retiring, Ozaki has worked as a trainer for K-1.

== Titles ==
- Professional
  - 2006 R.I.S.E. Dead Or Alive Tournament '06 champion
- Amateur
  - 11th Kanagawa Prefecture Taekwondo Championship winner (2000)
  - 12th Kanagawa Prefecture Taekwondo Championship Full contact Openweight winner (July 15, 2001)
  - 4th Tokyo Taekwondo Championship Full contact Openweight winner (October 8, 2001)
  - Chubu Taekwondo Championship winner (2000)
  - 12th All Japan University Taekwondo Championship Full contact Openweight winner (2000)
  - 13th All Japan University Taekwondo Championship Full contact Openweight winner (December 7, 2001)
  - 14th All Japan University Taekwondo Championship Kumite Openweight winner (September 16, 2002)
  - All Japan Taekwondo Championship 3rd place (2001)
  - 13th All Japan Full contact Taekwondo Championship Kumite Openweight winner (December 28, 2002)
  - 14th All Japan Full contact Taekwondo Championship winner (November 29, 2003)

== Kickboxing record ==
Professional Kickboxing record
27 Wins (9 (T)KO's, 14 decisions), 22 Losses (2 (T)KO's, 20 decisions), 1 Draw
Date	Result	Opponent	Event	Location	Method	Round	Time	Record
2014-10-05	Win	(Japan) Keisuke Kurihara	Krush 46	Tokyo, Japan	Decision (Unanimous)	3	3:00	27-22-1
2014-06-12	Loss	(Japan) Ikki	Krush 42	Tokyo, Japan	Decision (Unanimous)	3	3:00	26-22-1
2014-01-04	Loss	(Japan) Taito	Krush 37, -65 kg Championship Tournament, First Round	Tokyo, Japan	Decision (Unanimous)	3	3:00	26-21-1
2013-09-01	Loss	(Japan) Toshiki Taniyama	Bigbang 14	Tokyo, Japan	Ext.R Decision (Unanimous)	4	3:00	26-20-1
For Inaugural Bigbang Super Lightweight title.
2013-04-29	Loss	(Japan) Seiji Takahashi	NJKF: 2013 3rd	Tokyo, Japan	Decision (Unanimous)	3	3:00	26-19-1
2013-01-14	Loss	(Japan) Hiroya	Krush Grand Prix 2013 ~67 kg Tournament First Round~	Tokyo, Japan	Decision (majority)	3	3:00	26-18-1
2012-11-17	Loss	(France) Jessy Petit-Jean	La Nuit Du Kick Boxing	Liège, Belgium				26-17-1
For WKN World Lightweight Kickboxing Championship.
2012-10-21	Win	(Japan) Masanobu Goto	Krush-EX 2012 vol.5	Tokyo, Japan	Decision (Unanimous)	3		26-16-1
2012-06-26	Loss	(Japan) Taito	Krush. 22	Tokyo, Japan	Unanimous Decision	3		25-16-1
2012-07-19	Win	(China) Ding Ning	Krush.19	Tokyo, Japan	Decision (Unanimous)	3		25-15-1
2012-01-09	Win	(Japan) Hironori Hattori	Krush.15	Tokyo, Japan	KO	2	0:37	24-15-1
2011-10-22	Loss	(Georgia (country)) Roman Mailov	W5 Grand Prix K.O.	Moscow, Russia	Decision (Unanimous)	3	3:00	23-15-1
2011-08-14	Loss	(France) Thomas Adamandopoulos	Krush.11	Tokyo, Japan	Decision (Unanimous)	5	3:00	23-14-1
Fight was for I.S.K.A. World Kickboxing title (-62.300 kg).
2011-05-29	Win	(Korea) Park	Krush -70 kg First Generation Championship Tournament ~Round.1~	Korakuen Hall, Tokyo, Japan	Decision	3	3:00	23-13-1
2011-02-05	Win	(Japan) Yosuke Mizuochi	Bigbang 4	Tokyo, Japan	KO (3 Knockdowns)	3	2:22	22-13-1
2010-12-12	Win	(Japan) Toshiki Taniyama	Krush First Generation King Tournaments ~Round.1~	Korakuen Hall, Tokyo, Japan	KO (Taekwondo Back Kick then followed by punches)	3		22-12-1
2010-10-29	Win	(Japan) Hiroki Namai	Krush EX "Road to the Championship"	Shinjuku Face, Tokyo, Japan	KO (Spinning Backfist)	2		21-12-1
2010-09-20	Win	(Japan) Fumiya Sasaki	Krush.10	Shinjuku Face, Tokyo, Japan	KO	3	1:28	20-12-1
2010-07-05	Loss	(Japan) Yuta Kubo	K-1 World MAX 2010 -63kg Japan Tournament, Quarter Final	Bunkyo, Tokyo, Japan	Decision (Unanimous)	3	3:00	19-12-1
2010-05-02	Win	(Japan) Kosuke Komiyama	K-1 World MAX 2010 -63kg Japan Tournament Final 16 1st round	Bunkyo, Tokyo, Japan	Decision (Split)	3	3:00	19-11-1
Qualifies for K-1 World MAX 2010 -63kg Japan Tournament.
2010-03-13	Win	(Japan) Yoshi	Good Loser "Krush x Survivor"	Bunkyo, Tokyo, Japan	Decision (Unanimous)	3	3:00	18-11-1
2009-11-22	Loss	(Japan) Kan Itabashi	R.I.S.E. "R.I.S.E. 60"	Bunkyo, Tokyo, Japan	KO (Punches)	2	2:29	17-11-1
The bout was for Itabashi's title of R.I.S.E. 60kg class championship.
2009-08-14	Loss	(Japan) Genki Yamamoto	Krush "Krush Lightweight GP 2009 -Opening Round.2-" Round of 16	Bunkyo, Tokyo, Japan	Decision (Unanimous)	3	3:00	17-10-1
2009-05-31	Loss	(China) Xu Yan	The Challenger	Macau, China	Decision (Unanimous)	3	3:00	17-9-1
2009-02-23	Loss	(Japan) Yasuhito Shirasu	K-1 World MAX 2009 Japan Tournament Reserve match	Shibuya, Tokyo, Japan	Decision (Unanimous)	3	3:00	17-8-1
2008-11-08	Loss	(South Korea) Su Hwan Lee	AJKF "Krush! -Kickboxing Destruction-"	Bunkyo, Tokyo, Japan	Decision (Split)	4 (Ex.1)	3:00	17-7-1
2008-08-31	Win	(South Korea) Kwang-Sik John	J-Network "Team Dragon Quest 2"	Bunkyo, Tokyo, Japan	KO (Right low kick)	3	1:25	17-6-1
2008-02-02	Loss	(Japan) Yasuhiro Kido	K-1 World MAX 2008 Japan Tournament Quarterfinal	Chiyoda, Tokyo, Japan	Decision (Unanimous)	3	3:00	16-6-1
2007-10-25	Loss	(Japan) Yuya Yamamoto	AJKF "Roman Kick Return Kickboxer of the best 60 Tournament Final	Bunkyo, Tokyo, Japan	Decision (Majority)	3	3:00	16-5-1
2007-06-28	Win	(Hong Kong) Wing-Heung Pak	K-1 World MAX 2007 World Tournament Final Elimination Opening fight	Chiyoda, Tokyo, Japan	Decision (Unanimous)	3	3:00	16-4-1
2007-04-04	Loss	(Australia) Ian Schaffa	K-1 World MAX 2007 World Elite Showcase Super fight	Yokohama, Kanagawa, Japan	Decision (Unanimous)	3	3:00	16-4
2007-02-05	Loss	(Japan) Yoshihiro Sato	K-1 World MAX 2007 Japan Tournament Semifinal	Kōtō, Tokyo, Japan	Decision (Unanimous)	3	3:00	16-3
2007-02-05	Win	(Japan) Hiroki Shishido	K-1 World MAX 2007 Japan Tournament Quarterfinal	Kōtō, Tokyo, Japan	Decision (Unanimous)	3	3:00	16-2
2006-12-17	Win	(Japan) Naoki Samukawa	R.I.S.E. Dead or Alive Tournament '06	Kōtō, Tokyo, Japan	Decision (Unanimous)	3	3:00	15-2
Wins title of R.I.S.E. Dead or Alive Tournament '06 championship.
2006-12-17	Win	(Japan) Yuki	R.I.S.E. Dead or Alive Tournament '06	Kōtō, Tokyo, Japan	KO	2	1:58	14-2
2006-12-17	Win	(Japan) Hideki Mizutani	R.I.S.E. Dead or Alive Tournament '06	Kōtō, Tokyo, Japan	Decision (Unanimous)	3	3:00	13-2
2006-11-03	Win	(Japan) Kenji Kanai	Shoot Boxing World Tournament 2006 Opening match	Sumida, Tokyo, Japan	Decision (Unanimous)	3	3:00	12-2
2006-06-25	Loss	(Japan) Nobumitsu Sudo	R.I.S.E. Flash to Crush Tournament '06	Kōtō, Tokyo, Japan	KO (Punches)	2	1:28	11-2
2006-05-17	Ex	(Japan) Shingo Garyu	J-Network "Go! Go! J-Net '06 ~Invading the Dragon"	Bunkyo, Tokyo, Japan	No Decision	1	3:00	
2006-02-09	Win	(Japan) Hiroshi Sekimoto	Shoot Boxing 2006 Neo Orthros Series 1st	Bunkyo, Tokyo, Japan	Decision (Unanimous)	3	3:00	11-1
2005-12-18	Win	(Japan) Hiroshi Mizumachi	R.I.S.E. Dead or Alive Tournament '05	Kōtō, Tokyo, Japan	KO (Spinning back kick)	2	1:33	10-1
2005-10-30	Win	(Japan) Crazy884	R.I.S.E. XIX	Ōta, Tokyo, Japan	KO (Right hook)	1	2:03	9-1
2005-09-25	Win	(Japan) Taiga Yamaguchi	Shoot Boxing 20th Anniversary Series 4th	Bunkyo, Tokyo, Japan	Decision (Unanimous)	5	3:00	8-1
2005-07-31	Win	(Japan) Yuki	R.I.S.E. XVII	Ōta, Tokyo, Japan	TKO (Corner stoppage)	2	0:34	7-1
2005-05-29	Win	(Japan) Yuji Kitano	R.I.S.E. XVI	Ōta, Tokyo, Japan	Decision (Split)	3	3:00	6-1
2005-01-30	Win	(Japan) Takayoshi Kitayama	R.I.S.E. XII	Minato, Tokyo, Japan	Decision (Majority)	3	3:00	5-1
2004-11-28	Win	(Japan) Taisho	Future Fighter IKUSA -Sora- Gangstarz	Kōtō, Tokyo, Japan	TKO (Punches)	3	0:42	4-1
2004-07-04	Win	(Australia) Shannon Forrester	R.I.S.E. The Low Of The Ring -Japan vs. World-	Kōtō, Tokyo, Japan	Decision (Majority)	3	3:00	3-1
2004-04-29	Loss	(Japan) Keiichi Samukawa	R.I.S.E. VII	Ōta, Tokyo, Japan	Decision (Split)	4(Ex.1)	3:00	2-1
2003-12-23	Win	(Japan) Masaki Shimamura	R.I.S.E. Dead or Alive Tournament	Kōtō, Tokyo, Japan	Decision (Unanimous)	3	3:00	2-0
2003-09-28	Win	(Japan) Tomoaki Suehiro	R.I.S.E. Fourth	Ōta, Tokyo, Japan	Decision (Unanimous)	3	3:00	1-0
Legend: Win Loss Draw/No contest Notes
