= Yūji Nashiro =

Japanese kickboxer

Yuji Nashiro
- Born: September 13, 1983 (age 43); Nara City, Japan
- Nationality: (Japan) Japanese
- Height: 5 ft 6 in (1.68 m)
- Weight: 154 lb (70 kg; 11.0 st)
- Division: Welterweight
- Style: Kyokushin Karate, Kickboxing
- Team: Kokushi Kaikan; Sport Academy
- Years active: 2006-present

Kickboxing record
- Total: 16
- Wins: 10
- By knockout: 6
- Losses: 6
- By knockout: 1
- Draws: 0

Other information
- Notable relatives: Nobuo Nashiro (brother)
- Last updated on: July 28, 2013

Yuji Nashiro (名城裕司) (born September 13, 1983) is a Japanese kickboxer who competes in the welterweight division.

== Biography and career ==
Nashiro was born in Nara City and is the brother of world champion boxer Nobuo Nashiro. He began his martial arts career in Kyokushin karate, in which he was the Japanese and Asian champion in the middleweight division. He was also the amateur Muay Thai champion of Japan.

He made his professional kickboxing debut in 2006 and won his first three fights by knockout before taking a break from the sport for almost three years. He returned at the K-1 World MAX 2010 -70kg Japan Tournament where he was knocked out by Yuichiro Nagashima in the quarter-finals. Following this, he went on to compete in the Krush promotion where he won his first two fights before losing to Yoshihiro Sato.

He returned to the Japan MAX Tournament at K-1 World MAX 2011 -70kg Japan Tournament Final where he caused an upset by winning the tournament. He defeated 2002 World MAX champion Albert Kraus in the quarter-finals and Takafumi Morita in the semis, both by decision, before going on to knock out Yuya Yamamoto in the first round of the final.

On February 25, 2012, he defeated Yukihiko Komiya via majority decision at Big Bang 8 in Tokyo.

Nashiro moved down in weight to compete in the Krush Grand Prix 2013 ~67kg First Class Tournament~ on January 14, 2012, facing Abdallah Ezbiri at the quarter-finals. He came in overweight on his first two attempts and lost by unanimous decision.

He challenged Danilo Zanolini for his HEAT Middleweight (-70 kg/154 lb) Championship at HEAT 27 in Kobe, Japan on July 28, 2013, losing by unanimous decision.

== Titles ==
- All Japan Kyokushin Open Middle Weight Class Knockdown Karate Champion 2002
- Middle Asian Kyokushin Middle Weight Class Knockdown Karate Champion 2003
- K-2 Gloved Karate Kansai Tournament Champion 2006
- All Japan Glove Karate Competition Champion 2006
- WMFJ Japanese Amateur Muay Thai Champion
- All Japan Glove Karate Tournament Champion
- 2011 K-1 -70kg Japan Tournament Champion

== Kickboxing record ==
Kickboxing record
10 wins (6 KOs), 6 losses
| Date | Result | Opponent | Event | Location | Method | Round | Time | Record | Notes |
| July 28, 2013 | Loss | (Brazil) Danilo Zanolini | HEAT 27 | Kobe, Japan | Decision (unanimous) | 3 | 3:00 | 10-6 | For the HEAT Middleweight (-70 kg) Championship. |
| January 14, 2013 | Loss | (France) Abdellah Ezbiri | Krush Grand Prix 2013 ~67 kg Tournament First Round~ | Tokyo, Japan | Decision (unanimous) | 3 | 3:00 | 10-5 | Quarter-finals. |
| May 27, 2012 | Loss | (England) Reece McAllister | K-1 World MAX 2012 World Championship Tournament Final 16 | Madrid, Spain | Decision (unanimous) | 3 | 3:00 | 10-4 | First round. |
| February 25, 2012 | Win | (Japan) Yukihiko Komiya | Big Bang 8 | Tokyo, Japan | Decision (majority) | 3 | 3:00 | 10-3 | |
| September 25, 2011 | Win | (Japan) Yuya Yamamoto | K-1 World MAX 2011 -70kg Japan Tournament Final | Osaka, Japan | KO (punches) | 1 | 3:00 | 9-3 | 2011 Japan MAX Tournament final. |
| September 25, 2011 | Win | (Japan) Takafumi Morita | K-1 World MAX 2011 -70kg Japan Tournament Final | Osaka, Japan | Decision (unanimous) | 3 | 3:00 | 8-3 | 2011 Japan MAX Tournament semi-final. |
| September 25, 2011 | Win | (Netherlands) Albert Kraus | K-1 World MAX 2011 -70kg Japan Tournament Final | Osaka, Japan | Decision (unanimous) | 3 | 3:00 | 7-3 | 2011 Japan MAX Tournament quarter-final. |
| May 29, 2011 | Loss | (Japan) Kosuke Yamauchi | Krush Championship Tournament: Round 1 | Japan | Decision | 3 | 3:00 | 6-3 | |
| January 29, 2011 | Win | (Japan) Daisuke Tsutsumi | Krush Championship Tournament: Round 2 | Japan | Decision | 3 | 3:00 | 6-2 | |
| August 14, 2010 | Loss | (Japan) Yoshihiro Sato | Krush.9 | Tokyo, Japan | Decision (unanimous) | 3 | 3:00 | 5-2 | |
| July 9, 2010 | Win | (Japan) Kenta | Krush.8 | Japan | Decision | 3 | 3:00 | 5-1 | |
| May 27, 2010 | Win | (Japan) Hiroshi Yamauchi | Krush.7 | Japan | KO (left high kick) | 1 | 1:57 | 4-1 | |
| March 27, 2010 | Loss | (Japan) Yuichiro Nagashima | K-1 World MAX 2010 –70 kg Japan Tournament | Saitama, Japan | KO (left hook) | 1 | 0:39 | 3-1 | 2010 Japan MAX Tournament quarter-final. |
| June 28, 2007 | Win | (Japan) Hakuto | K-1 World MAX 2007 World Tournament Final Elimination | Tokyo, Japan | TKO (three knockdowns) | 2 | 2:46 | 3-0 | |
| April 4, 2007 | Win | (Japan) Teppei Yasuda | K-1 World MAX 2007 World Elite Showcase | Yokohama, Japan | KO (left knee) | 1 | 2:12 | 2-0 | |
| September 23, 2006 | Win | (Canada) Phil Leier | H2H Shockwave | Calgary, Alberta, Canada | KO (right hook) | 3 | - | 1-0 | |
Legend: Win Loss Draw/No contest
