= Tatsuji =

- Gender: Male

Origin
- Origin: Japanese
- Meaning: Different meanings depending on the kanji used

Tatsuji (written: 達治, 達次 or 辰次) is a masculine Japanese given name. Notable people with the name include:

- Tatsuji Fuse (布施 辰治; 1880–1953), Japanese lawyer and social activist
- Tatsuji Inouye (井上 達二; 1881–1976), Japanese ophthalmologist
- Tatsuji Miyoshi (三好 達治; 1900–1964), Japanese poet, writer, critic and editor
- Tatsuji Nishimura (西村 龍次; born 1968), Japanese former Nippon Professional Baseball pitcher
- Tatsuji Nojima (野島 達司; born 1998), Japanese visual effects artist and compositor
- Tatsuji Nomura (野村 達次; born 1922), Japanese scientist
- Tatsuji Okawa (大川 辰次; 1904–1994), Japanese homoerotic fetish artist
- Tatsuji Suga (菅 辰次; 1885–1945), Japanese military officer
- Tatsuji Sugimoto (杉本 達治; born 1962), Japanese politician
