= Cheyenne Aldus =

Dutch kickboxer

- Born: Cheyenne Aldus; July 5, 2006 (age 20)
- Nickname: The Destroyer
- Nationality: Dutch
- Height: 1.73 m (5 ft 8 in)
- Weight: 55 kg (121 lb; 8.7 st)
- Style: Muay Thai , Kickboxing
- Fighting out of: Capelle aan den IJssel, Netherlands
- Team: Eagle Gym
- Years active: 2024 - present

Kickboxing record
- Total: 8
- Wins: 8
- By knockout: 1
- Losses: 0
- By knockout: 0
- Draws: 0

Cheyenne Aldus (born July 5, 2006) is a Dutch kickboxer.

As of June 2026, she is ranked as the tenth best women's bantamweight in the world by Beyond Kickboxing.

== Professional Kickboxing career ==
Aldus made her professional debut on December 14, 2024, at Enfusion #145, where she defeated Gina Hooglugt by decision to win the inaugural ECE Xtreme Standup World Flyweight (-57 kg) title.

On December 14, 2025, Aldus faced Nehir Karaca for the inaugural IFP World Super Flyweight (-55 kg) title at IFP Cage Series. She won the title by unanimous decision.

Aldus faced reigning Krush Women's Flyweight champion Sofia Tsolakidou at IFP Fight Series #5 on May 23, 2026. She won the fight by unanimous decision.

Aldus faced Ester Viola at FCE 5 on June 18, 2026. She won the fight by a second-round knockout.

== Championships and accomplishments ==
- Enfusion
  - 2024 ECE Xtreme Standup World Flyweight (-57 kg) Champion
  - 2025 ECE Xtreme Standup World Strawweight (-52 kg) Champion
- International Fight Promotion
  - 2025 IFP World Super Flyweight (-55 kg) Champion

== Fight record ==
Professional Kickboxing record
8 Wins (1 (T)KO's), 0 Losses, 0 Draw, 0 No Contests
Date	Result	Opponent	Event	Location	Method	Round	Time
2026-06-18	Win	(Italy) Ester Viola	FCE 5	Lisbon, Portugal	KO (Head kick)	2	1:47
2026-05-23	Win	(Greece) Sofia Tsolakidou	IFP Fight Series #5	Essen, Germany	Decision (Unanimous)	3	3:00
2026-03-28	Win	(China) Li Lishan	IFP Fight Series #4	Darmstadt, Germany	Decision (Unanimous)	3	3:00
2026-02-07	Win	(Netherlands) Miranda Zondervan	Fight Night Promotions	Turnhout, Belgium	Decision	3	3:00
2025-12-14	Win	(Turkey) Nehir Karaca	IFP Cage Series	Genk, Belgium	Decision (Unanimous)	5	3:00
Wins the inaugural IFP World Super Flyweight (-55 kg) title.
2025-09-27	Win	(Netherlands) Valence Bickel	IFP Fight Series #3	Genk, Belgium	Decision (Split)	3	3:00
2025-05-24	Win	(Netherlands) Manon Leeuwinga	8TKO #16	Wuppertal, Germany	Decision	3	3:00
Wins the inaugural Enfusion Cage Event Xtreme Standup World Strawweight (-52 kg) title.
2024-12-14	Win	(Netherlands) Gina Hooglugt	Enfusion #145	Wuppertal, Germany	Decision	3	3:00
Wins the inaugural Enfusion Cage Event Xtreme Standup World Flyweight (-57 kg) title.
Legend: Win Loss Draw/No contest Notes

== See also ==
- List of female kickboxers
