= Ayinta Ali =

Japanese kickboxer

- Born: 寧仁太・アリ; March 29, 1999 (age 27); Tokyo, Japan
- Nationality: Japanese; Ghanaian
- Height: 184 cm (6 ft 0 in)
- Weight: 67.5 kg (149 lb; 10.63 st)
- Style: Kickboxing
- Stance: Orthodox
- Fighting out of: Osaka, Japan
- Team: Fired Up Gym (MMA); K-1 Gym Sohonbu Team Pegasus (kickboxing)

Kickboxing record
- Total: 11
- Wins: 9
- By knockout: 5
- Losses: 2
- By knockout: 1

Ayinta Ali (Japanese: 寧仁太・アリ, Ali Ayinta; born March 29, 1999) is a Japanese-Ghanaian kickboxer and mixed martial artist. He is the a former Krush Welterweight champion.

As of March 2022, he was the #8 ranked super featherweight kickboxer in the world by Combat Press.

== Kickboxing career ==
=== K-1 ===
==== Early career ====
Ali made his professional debut against Takuma Shimizu at Krush 104 on August 31, 2019. He won the fight by a third-round knockout. The bout was stopped on the advice of the ringside physician at the 1:04 minute mark, due to a cut above Shimizu's left eyelid. Ali made his second Krush appearance at Krush 107 on November 8, 2019, against Mark Bird James. He won the fight by a third-round knockout, flooring James with a right hook.

Ali left Krush for his next bout, as he was booked to face Takeharu Ogawa at Bigbang the future 26 on August 16, 2020. He won the fight by a third-round head kick knockout.

Ali made his K-1 debut against Kaito at K-1 World GP 2021: K’Festa 4 Day 2 on March 28, 2021. He won the fight by a third-round knockout. Ali first dropped Kaito with a head kick at the 2:00 minute mark of the last round, before finishing him with a right cross thirty seconds later.

Ali was next booked to face the former Krush Welterweight champion Kazuki Yamagiawa in the co-main event of Krush 126 on June 25, 2021. He won the fight by unanimous decision. Two of the judges scored the bout 30–28 in his favor, while the third judge awarded him a 30–29 scorecard.

==== K-1 Welterweight Grand Prix ====
On August 18, 2021, it was announced that Ali would participate in the 2021 K-1 Welterweight World Grand Prix, which was held at K-1 World GP 2021: Yokohamatsuri on September 20, 2021. He was booked to face Ruku Kojima in the tournament quarterfinals. He won the fight by unanimous decision, with two judges scoring the bout 30–28, and the third 30–29, in his favor.

Ali advanced to the semifinals, where he faced the 2017 K-1 Japan Grand Prix super lightweight champion, and tournament favorite, Masaaki Noiri. Ali was knocked down early in the opening round with body strikes, and although he was able to rise in time to beat the eight count, he was quickly knocked down for the second time with a left hook to the body. This resulted in an automatic technical knockout loss for Ali, per the rules of the tournament.

==== Krush welterweight champion ====
Ayinta was scheduled to challenge the reigning Krush Welterweight titleholder Riki Matsuoka at Krush 134 on February 20, 2022, in what was Matsuoka's first title defense. The fight was ruled a split decision draw following the first three rounds. Ali was awarded the split decision victory after an extra round was contested, with two judges scoring the bout 10–9 for him, while the third judge awarded the same scorecard to Matsuoka.

Ayinta made his first defense against the one-time Krush Super Lightweight title challenger Kota Nakano at Krush 140 on August 27, 2022. He won the fight by a second-round knockout. Ayinta knocked his opponent down twice, both times with a right straight, once in the first round and once in the second round. Although Nakano was able to beat the eight count both times, he was unsteady on his feet following the second knockdown, which forced the referee to wave the fight off.

Ayinta faced Takumi Sanekata at K-1 World GP 2023: K'Festa 6 on March 12, 2023. He won the fight by unanimous decision, with all three judges awarding him a 30–28 scorecard.

Ayinta faced the four-weight Rajadamnern Stadium champion Jomthong Strikergym at K-1 World GP 2023 on July 17, 2023. He lost the fight by unanimous decision, with two scorecards of 30–26 and one scorecard of 30–27.

On February 20, 2025, it was announced that Ali had vacated his Krush Welterweight title as he planned a transition to MMA.

== Titles and accomplishments ==
Professional

- Krush
  - 2022 Krush Welterweight Championship (1 defense)

Amateur

- K-1
  - 2018 K-1 Challenge B-Class -70 kg Tournament winner
  - 2018 K-1 Challenge B-Class -70 kg Tournament winner
  - 2019 K-1 Challenge A-Class -70 kg Tournament winner

== Mixed martial arts record ==
Professional record breakdown
2 matches	0 wins	2 losses
By submission	0	1
By decision	0	1

Res.	Record	Opponent	Method	Event	Date	Round	Time	Location	Notes
Loss	0–2	Tommy Watanabe	Sumbmission (rear naked choke)	DEEP Fight Challenge 2026 1st Round	January 23, 2026	2	2:13	Tokyo, Japan	
Loss	0–1	Yuga Nakaya	Decision (unanimous)	DEEP Tokyo Impact 2025 5th Round	November 12, 2025	2	5:00	Tokyo, Japan	Lightweight debut.

== Kickboxing record ==
Professional kickboxing record
9 wins (5 (T)KOs), 2 losses, 0 draws, 0 no contests
Date	Result	Opponent	Event	Location	Method	Round	Time
2023-07-17	Loss	(Thailand) Jomthong Strikergym	K-1 World GP 2023	Tokyo, Japan	Decision (unanimous)	3	3:00
2023-03-12	Win	(Japan) Takumi Sanekata	K-1 World GP 2023: K'Festa 6	Tokyo, Japan	Decision (unanimous)	3	3:00
2022-08-27	Win	(Japan) Kota Nakano	Krush 140	Tokyo, Japan	KO (punches)	2	0:55
Defends the Krush Welterweight title.
2022-02-20	Win	(Japan) Riki Matsuoka	Krush 134	Tokyo, Japan	Ext.R decision (split)	4	3:00
Wins the Krush Welterweight title.
2021-09-20	Loss	(Japan) Masaaki Noiri	K-1 2021: Yokohamatsuri Welterweight World Grand Prix, Semi Final	Yokohama, Japan	TKO (2 knockdowns)	1	1:32
2021-09-20	Win	(Japan) Ruku Kojima	K-1 2021: Yokohamatsuri Welterweight World Grand Prix, Quarter Final	Yokohama, Japan	Decision (unanimous)	3	3:00
2021-06-25	Win	(Japan) Kazuki Yamagiawa	Krush 126	Tokyo, Japan	Decision (unanimous)	3	3:00
2021-03-28	Win	(Japan) Kaito	K-1 World GP 2021: K’Festa 4 Day.2	Tokyo, Japan	KO (right cross)	3	2:30
2020-08-16	Win	(Japan) Takeharu Ogawa	Bigbang the future 26	Tokyo, Japan	KO (knee to the head)	3	
2019-11-08	Win	(Northern Ireland) Mark Bird James	Krush 107	Tokyo, Japan	KO (right hook)	3	1:35
2019-08-31	Win	(Japan) Takuma Shimizu	Krush 104	Tokyo, Japan	TKO (doctor stoppage)	3	1:04
Legend: Win Loss Draw/no contest Notes

Amateur kickboxing record
Date	Result	Opponent	Event	Location	Method	Round	Time
2019-03-24	Win	(Japan) Genki Amemiya	K-1 Amateur Challenge A-class -70 kg Tournament, Final	Tokyo, Japan	Decision (unanimous)	1	2:00
Wins the K-1 Challenge A-Class -70kg Tournament.
2019-03-24	Win	(Japan) Ken Noda	K-1 Amateur Challenge A-class -70 kg Tournament, Semi Final	Tokyo, Japan	KO	1	
2018-10-14	Win	(Japan) Rikoku Som	K-1 Amateur Challenge B-class -70 kg Tournament, Final	Tokyo, Japan	Decision (unanimous)	1	2:00
Wins the K-1 Challenge B-Class -70kg Tournament.
2018-10-14	Win	(Japan) Daisuke Arakawa	K-1 Amateur Challenge B-class -70 kg Tournament, Semi Final	Tokyo, Japan	Decision (unanimous)	1	2:00
2018-10-14	Win	(Japan) Naoki Kitabayashi	K-1 Amateur Challenge B-class -70 kg Tournament, Quarter Final	Tokyo, Japan	Decision (unanimous)	1	2:00
2018-09-09	Win	(Japan) Katsuhiko Motomiya	K-1 Amateur Challenge B-class -70 kg Tournament, Final	Tokyo, Japan	Decision	1	2:00
Wins the K-1 Challenge B-Class -70kg Tournament.
2018-09-09	Win	(Japan) Tomoya Shimamura	K-1 Amateur Challenge B-class -70 kg Tournament, Semi Final	Tokyo, Japan	Forfeit		
2018-09-09	Win	(Japan) Hiroto Amagi	K-1 Amateur Challenge B-class -70 kg Tournament, Quarter Final	Tokyo, Japan	Decision	1	2:00
2018-07-29	Win	(Japan) Kuramoto	K-1 Amateur Challenge B-class	Tokyo, Japan	KO		
2018-06-10	Win	(Japan) Daisuke Niinuma	K-1 Amateur Challenge C-class	Tokyo, Japan	Decision	2	2:00
Legend: Win Loss Draw/no contest Notes

== See also ==
- List of male kickboxers
- List of Krush champions
