= Sofia Tsolakidou =

Greek kickboxer

- Born: Σοφία Τσολακίδου; 8 August 2006 (age 20); Athens, Greece
- Height: 162 cm (5 ft 4 in)
- Weight: 52 kg (115 lb; 8 st 3 lb)
- Style: Kickboxing
- Stance: Orthodox
- Team: Panthers Sports Academy
- Trainer: Fotini Stamatopoulou

Kickboxing record
- Total: 5
- Wins: 3
- By knockout: 1
- Losses: 2
- Draws: 0

Sofia Tsolakidou (born 8 August 2006) is a Greek kickboxer.

As of September 2025 she was the #9 ranked -53.5 kg kickboxer in the world according to Beyond Kickboxing.

== Career ==
Tsolakidou made her professional on April 12, 2024, against Mellony Geugjes at KOK Fight Night in Athens. She won the fight by unanimous decision.

On May 18, 2025, Tsolakidou faced Nora Perez for the vacant WAKO-Pro Mediterranean Featherweight title. She won the fight by first-round technical knockout.

On August 23, 2025, Tsolakidou travelled to Tokyo, Japan, to challenge Noriko Ikeuchi for her Krush Women's Flyweight title. She won the fight by extension round unanimous decision.

Tsolakidou would be scheduled to challenge SAHO for the K-1 Women's Flyweight Championship at K-1 World MAX 2025 - 70kg World Championship Tournament Final on November 15, 2025. It was announced that the bout was cancelled because Tolakidou withdrew due to a lumbar disc herniation on October 24, 2025. They rescheduled the fight for K-1 World GP 2026 - 90kg World Tournament on February 8, 2026. She lost the fight by unanimous decision.

Tsolakidou faced Cheyenne Aldus at IFP Fight Series #5 on May 23, 2026. She lost the fight by unanimous decision.

== Championships and awards ==
=== Professional ===
- World Association of Kickboxing Organizations
  - 2025 WAKO-Pro K-1 Mediterranean Featherweight (-55 kg) Champion
- Krush
  - 2025 Krush Women's Flyweight (-52kg) Champion

=== Aamateur ===
- World Association of Kickboxing Organizations
  - 2025 WAKO Bulgarian European Cup K-1 -60 kg (gold)
  - 2024 WAKO European Championships K-1 -56 kg (gold)
  - 2024 WAKO Youth World Championships Older Junior K-1 -56 kg (gold)
  - 2024 WAKO Hungarian Kickboxing World Cup Older Junior Low Kick -56 kg (gold)
  - 2023 WAKO Cadets and Junior European Championships Older Junior Low Kick -56 kg (silver)
  - 2023 WAKO Hungarian Kickboxing World Cup Older Junior Low Kick -56 kg (gold)

== Karate Combat record ==
Res.	Record	Opponent	Method	Event	Date	Round	Time	Location	Notes
Loss	0–1	Kyara van der Klooster	Ext.R Decision	RCC x Karate Combat Fight Night	October 17, 2026	4	3:00	Yekaterinburg, Russia	

== Kickboxing record ==
Professional Kickboxing Record
3 Wins (1 (T)KOs), 2 Losses, 0 Draw
Date	Result	Opponent	Event	Location	Method	Round	Time
2026-05-23	Loss	(Netherlands) Cheyenne Aldus	IFP Fight Series #5	Essen, Germany	Decision (Unanimous)	3	3:00
2026-02-08	Loss	(Japan) SAHO	K-1 World GP 2026 - 90kg World Tournament	Tokyo, Japan	Decision (Unanimous)	3	3:00
For the K-1 Women's Flyweight Championship.
2025-08-23	Win	(Japan) Noriko Ikeuchi	Krush 179	Tokyo, Japan	Ext.R Decision (Unanimous)	4	3:00
Wins the Krush Women's Flyweight (-52kg) title.
2025-05-18	Win	(Spain) Nora Perez		Heraklion, Greece	TKO	1	
Wins the vacant WAKO-Pro K-1 Mediterranean Featherweight (-55kg) title.
2024-04-12	Win	(Netherlands) Mellony Geugjes	KOK Fight Night - Spartan's Night V	Athens, Greece	Decision	3	3:00
Legend: Win Loss Draw/No contest Notes

=== Amateur record ===
Amateur Kickboxing Record
Date	Result	Opponent	Event	Location	Method	Round	Time
2025-06-13	Loss	(Portugal) Sofia Oliveira	WAKO Hungarian Kickboxing World Cup 2025, Quarterfinals	Budapest, Hungary	Decision (unanimous)	3	2:00
2025-06-13	Win	(Italy) Sofia Calderini	WAKO Hungarian Kickboxing World Cup 2025, First Round	Budapest, Hungary	Decision (unanimous)	3	2:00
2025-06-23	Win	(Ukraine) Alina Martynuk	WAKO Bulgaria European Cup 2025, Final	Plovdiv, Bulgaria	Decision (unanimous)	3	2:00
Wins 2025 WAKO Bulgaria European Cup K-1 -60kg Gold Medal.
2025-06-23	Win	(Spain) Picaza Izaro Blanco	WAKO Bulgaria European Cup 2025, Semifinals	Plovdiv, Bulgaria	Decision (split)	3	2:00
2024-11-10	Win	(Czech Republic) Michaela Kerlehova	2024 WAKO European Championships, Final	Athens, Greece	Decision (unanimous)	3	2:00
Wins 2024 WAKO European Championships K-1 -56kg Gold Medal.
2024-11-09	Win	(Poland) Oliwia Kramarz	2024 WAKO European Championships, Semifinals	Athens, Greece	Decision (split)	3	2:00
2024-11-08	Win	(Turkey) Tugce Fedakarturk	2024 WAKO European Championships, Quarterfinals	Athens, Greece	Decision (split)	3	2:00
2024-11-08	Win	(Bulgaria) Polina Galinova	2024 WAKO European Championships, First Round	Athens, Greece	Decision (split)	3	2:00
2024-09-01	Win	(Turkey) Ceren Sanli Elif	2024 WAKO Youth World Championships, Final	Budapest, Hungary	Decision (split)	3	2:00
Wins 2024 WAKO Youth World Championships Older Junior K-1 -56kg Gold Medal.
2024-08-31	Win	(Poland) Zuzanna Topor	2024 WAKO Youth World Championships, Semifinals	Budapest, Hungary	Decision (unanimous)	3	2:00
2024-08-30	Win	(Switzerland) Ally Verfaillie	2024 WAKO Youth World Championships, Quarterfinals	Budapest, Hungary	Decision (unanimous)	3	2:00
2024-06-16	Win	(Moldova) Liubovi Filippov	WAKO Hungarian Kickboxing World Cup 2024, Final	Budapest, Hungary	Decision (unanimous)	3	2:00
Wins 2024 Hungarian Kickboxing World Cup Older Junior Low Kick -56kg Gold Medal.
2024-06-15	Win	(Croatia) Doris Suvajac	WAKO Hungarian Kickboxing World Cup 2024, Semifinals	Budapest, Hungary	Decision	3	2:00
2024-03-10	Win	(Greece) Mina Kirlaki	Champions Night 70, Final	Athens, Greece	KO	1	
2024-03-10	Win	(Greece) Anastasia Kokloni	Champions Night 70, Semifinals	Athens, Greece	Decision (unanimous)	3	2:00
2024-01-28	Win	(Greece) Christina-Agapi Ntinopoulou	WAKO Athens Challenge European Cup 2024	Athens, Greece	Decision (unanimous)	3	2:00
2023-01-20	Win	(Greece) Noelia Tabakou	Champions Night 69	Greece	Decision (unanimous)	3	2:00
2023-09-03	Loss	(Italy) Martina Di Franco	2023 WAKO Cadets and Junior European Championships, Final	Istanbul, Turkey	Decision (split)	3	2:00
Wins 2023 WAKO Cadets and Junior European Championships Older Junior Low Kick -56kg Silver Medal.
2023-09-02	Win	(Poland) Natalia Bien	2023 WAKO Cadets and Junior European Championships, Semifinals	Istanbul, Turkey	Decision (unanimous)	3	2:00
2023-06-18	Win	(Serbia) Sara Pejanovic	WAKO Hungarian Kickboxing World Cup 2023, Final	Budapest, Hungary	Decision (unanimous)	3	2:00
Wins 2023 Hungarian Kickboxing World Cup Older Junior Low Kick -56kg Gold Medal.
2023-06-17	Win	(North Macedonia) Jadranka Temelkova	WAKO Hungarian Kickboxing World Cup 2023, Semifinals	Budapest, Hungary	Decision (unanimous)	3	2:00
2023-04-30	Win	(Greece) Anna Revzian	WAKO Athens Challenge European Cup 2023	Athens, Greece	Decision (unanimous)	3	2:00
2023-01-21	Loss	(Greece) Alexia Tsiga	Greek Fights Pro Am 1	Greece	Decision (unanimous)	3	2:00
2022-10-	Loss	(Bulgaria) Alisia Susanina	2022 WAKO Cadets and Junior European Championships, Quarterfinals	Jesolo, Italy	Decision (unanimous)	3	2:00
2022-10-	Win	(Italy) Ginevra Topa	2022 WAKO Cadets and Junior European Championships, First Round	Jesolo, Italy	Decision (split)	3	2:00
Legend: Win Loss Draw/No contest Notes
