= Rukiya Anpo =

Japanese kickboxer (born 1995)

- Born: 安保瑠輝也; October 29, 1995 (age 30); Himeji, Japan
- Other names: Demolition Man
- Height: 184 cm (6 ft 0 in)
- Weight: 70 kg (154 lb; 11 st 0 lb)
- Division: Featherweight
- Style: Kyokushin, kickboxing
- Stance: Orthodox
- Fighting out of: Osaka, Japan
- Team: TRY HARD (2016–2017); ALL-WIN (2018–2022); MFL team CLUB es (2023–present)
- Rank: Black belt in Shin Karate
- Years active: 2011 – present

Kickboxing record
- Total: 37
- Wins: 27
- By knockout: 14
- Losses: 9
- By knockout: 5
- Draws: 1

Mixed martial arts record
- Total: 1
- Wins: 0
- Losses: 1
- By submission: 1

Other information
- Notable relatives: Riku Anpo (brother)

saikyo01densetu

YouTube information
- Channel: 安保瑠輝也 あんぽるきや
- Years active: 2020–present
- Genres: vlog; entertainment
- Subscribers: 695 thousand
- Views: 355 million
- Last updated: 24 June 2025

Rukiya Anpo (安保瑠輝也, Anpo Rukiya; born 29 October 1995) is a Japanese kickboxer, who competed in the super lightweight and welterweight divisions of K-1. A professional competitor since 2011, he is the former K-1 Super Lightweight champion and the 2021 K-1 welterweight Grand Prix runner-up.

As of December 2021, Combat Press ranks him as the eight best super featherweight in the world. From June 2021 to February 2021 Combat Press ranked him as the #4 featherweight in the world. He's been ranked in the featherweight top ten since March 2019.

== Personal life ==
Rukiya started training in Kyokushin Karate at a young age along his brother, they both left the world of Karate competitions with high accolades. Japanese television did a short documentary when they were children depicting them as Karate prodigies.

In 2018 he and his brother left the TRY HARD gym from Tokyo to open their own gym called ALL WIN in Osaka which they established with the help of crowdfunding.

== Kickboxing career ==
=== Career beginnings ===
==== Early career ====
Anpo made his professional debut against Taiju Shiratori at Muay Lok 2011 -3rd- on August 7, 2011. He lost the fight by decision. He would amass a 10–5 record over the course of the next five years, most notably reaching the final of the Emei Legend 65 kg Tournament, held at EM Legend 15. He lost the final bout against Singmanee Kaewsamrit by decision.

==== Early K-1 career ====
Anpo was scheduled to fight against Hiroshi Mizumachi at K-1 World GP 2017 Lightweight Championship Tournament on February 25, 2017. He won the fight by a jumping switch kick knockout, landing it six seconds into the second round.

Anpo was scheduled to fight Wang Zhiwei the Wu Lin Feng 2017: China VS Europe event on April 1, 2017. He won the fight by decision.

Anpo was scheduled to face Deng Zeqi at Krush 77 on July 16, 2017. He won the fight by a first-round knockout, landing a flying knee with just seven seconds left in the round.

Anpo was scheduled to face Kyoshiro at Krush 82 on November 5, 2017. He won the fight by unanimous decision.

His four-fight winning streak was snapped by Gonnapar Weerasakreck at K-1 World GP 2018: 2nd Featherweight Championship Tournament on June 17, 2018. Gonnapar won the fight by a second-round knockout, landing a left cross mid-way through the round.

=== K-1 Super Lightweight title run ===
Anpo was scheduled to face Kenta Hayashi at K-1 World GP 2018: inaugural Cruiserweight Championship Tournament on September 24, 2018. Anpo won the bout by a third-round knockout. Although Hayashi spent the majority of the fight advancing on Anpo and backing him into the ring corners, Anpo was able to land a left straight from the southpaw stance which knocked Hayashi out.

Anpo was scheduled to face Hideaki Yamazaki at K-1 World GP 2018: K-1 Lightweight World's Strongest Tournament on December 8, 2018. The fight was ruled a draw after the first three rounds were fought, with all three judges scoring the fight as 28–28. Anpo won the fight by an extension-round knockout, landing a head kick just 14 seconds into the round. Their fight was later awarded "Fight of the Year" honors at the 2018 "K-1 Awards".

Anpo was scheduled to fight the former Krush Lightweight champion Daizo Sasaki at K-1 World GP 2019: K'FESTA 2 on March 10, 2019. Anpo won the fight by unanimous decision, with scores of 30–27, 30–27 and 29–28.

=== K-1 Super Lightweight champion ===
==== The Kaew duology ====
His three-fight winning streak with the promotion earned Anpo the chance to challenge the reigning K-1 Super Lightweight champion Kaew Fairtex at K-1 World GP 2019: Super Bantamweight World Tournament on June 30, 2019. In preparation for the title fight, Anpo added former boxing world titlists Hozumi Hasegawa and Tomoki Kameda to his fight camp, as well as conditioning coach Masayoshi Hideshima. Anpo had trouble making weight for the bout, missing by 150 g on his first weigh-in, but making weight after removing his shorts.

The fight was ruled a majority draw after the first three rounds were fought, with one judge scoring the bout 30–29 for Kaew, while the remaining two judges scored the fight as a draw. Accordingly, an extra round was fought, during which Kaew was deducted a point for pulling down Anpo's head. Anpo won the fight by unanimous decision, with all three judges scoring the last round 10–8 in his favor. The decision to deduct a point was seen as controversial, with Combat Press awarding this bout their "Robbery of the Year" award, and declaring that "the referee blatantly robbed him of a victory when he handed [Kaew] a yellow card". During the post-fight interview, Anpo stated his dissatisfaction with how the fight ended and called for a rematch with Kaew.

The immediate rematch was scheduled six months after their first fight, at K-1 World GP 2019 Japan: ～Women's Flyweight Championship Tournament～ on December 28, 2019. The fight was once again ruled a majority draw, with one of the judges scoring the fight for Kaew, while two of the judges scored the fight as a draw. As in their first meeting, Anpo won the fight by unanimous decision, after an extra round was fought. He apologized for his poor performance during the post-fight interview, stating that he was too nervous to fight properly.

==== Anpo vs. Fukashi ====
Anpo was scheduled to make his second title defense against Fukashi Mizutani at K-1: K'Festa 3 on March 22, 2020. Anpo had trouble making weight, missing weight by 150 g on the first attempt. A second weigh-in was held half an hour later, with Anpo successfully making weight after he had removed his clothes. Anpo's poor physical condition after the weigh-ins prevented him from attending the pre-fight press conference.

Anpo won the fight by unanimous decision, managing to knock Fukashi down in the first round. Fukashi rallied in the second round, but was unable to maintain sustained offense against the champion. During the post-fight press conference, Anpo claimed he was considering a move up in weight, although he wanted to defend his title against Hideaki Yamazaki first.

==== Anpo vs. Yamazaki ====
Anpo was scheduled to make his third title defense against Hideaki Yamazaki at K-1 World GP 2020 in Osaka on September 22, 2020. The fight was a rematch of their December 8, 2018, "Fight of the Year" meeting, which Anpo won by technical knockout. He was dismissive of Yamazaki during his pre-fight interviews, saying "Yamazaki is a fighter who has declined or stagnated since two years ago", and describing Yamazaki as a "stepping stone". Anpo was able to successfully make weight for the bout on the first attempt, coming in 200 g under the weight limit.

Yamazaki won the fight by a dominant first-round knockout. He opened the fight with a series of hooks which forced Anpo to shell up behind a high guard. Although Anpo managed to retaliate with a jab, Yamazaki redoubled his offense, knocking Anpo out with a left hook. The fight was voted the second best bout of the year at the 2020 K-1 Awards.

=== Move to welterweight ===
==== First welterweight fights ====
Anpo moved up from super lightweight (65 kg) to K-1's welterweight (67.5 kg) division for his next bout. He was scheduled to face Kaito at K-1: K'Festa 4 on January 24, 2021. The whole event was later cancelled due to the COVID-19 pandemic. After his fight with Kaito was cancelled, Anpo opted to undergo surgery to repair his right hand.

Anpo was scheduled to face Koki at K-1 World GP 2021 in Fukuoka on July 17, 2021. Anpo scored the first knockdown of the fight with a right straight, after just 19 seconds. He scored the second knockdown with a left hook, after pressuring Koki into the ring corner. The fight ended after Anpo scored a third knockdown, which came as a result of a series of kicks.

==== K-1 Welterweight World Grand Prix ====
Anpo was scheduled to face Alan Soares in the quarterfinals of the K-1 Welterweight World Grand Prix, held at K-1 World GP 2021: Yokohamatsuri on September 20, 2021. The tournament was organized to crown a new champion, as the title was left vacant following the retirement of Yuta Kubo. Anpo made quick work of his quarterfinal opponent, as he stopped him in 31 seconds. He knocked him down with a head kick, although Soares managed to beat the eight count. Soares was quickly knocked down a second time with a left hook, which resulted in an automatic technical knockout victory for Anpo, due to the rules of the tournament.

Anpo faced Riki Matsuoka in the tournament semifinals, who had earned his place there with a second-round technical knockout of Maki Dwansonpong. Anpo knocked Matsuoka down in the first round with an overhand right, and controlled the pace of the bout in the second round as well. He upped the pressure in the third round and knocked Matsuoka down twice, with a left hook and a left hook to the body, which once again earned him a technical knockout victory.

Anpo faced the highly accomplished veteran Masaaki Noiri in the tournament finals, who earned his place in the final match with stoppage victories against FUMIYA and Ali Ayinta. Anpo appeared to have won the first two rounds on the judges scorecards, but his output and movement were both crippled due to Noiri's calf kicks and body shots. Noiri completely took over the third round, and knocked Anpo down three times with body shots, which resulted in a technical knockout victory for him.

==== Continued welterweight career ====
Anpo was scheduled to face Kaito at K-1 World GP 2021 in Osaka on December 4, 2021. The pair was previously scheduled to fight at K-1: K'Festa 4 on January 24, 2021, before the event was postponed due to the COVID-19 pandemic and K'Festa 4 Day 2 on March 27, 2021, when Anpo was forced to withdraw with a hand injury. Anpo won the fight by a first-round technical knockout, after successfully knocking Kaito down three times before the two minute mark of the opening round.

Anpo faced Playchumphon Sor.Srisomphong at K-1: K'Festa 5 on April 3, 2022. He was unable to attend the pre-fight press conference however, as he had come in contact with a COVID-19 infected person. He won the fight by a first-round knockout and asked for a rematch with Masaaki Noiri in his post-fight interview.

Anpo faced the reigning RISE Super Lightweight Championship Kosei Yamada at THE MATCH 2022 on June 19, 2022. The bout was fought at a 67 kg catchweight. Anpo won the fight by a narrow unanimous decision, with all three judges scoring the bout 30–29 in his favor. On December 31, 2022, Anpo announced his departure from K-1.

=== Move to super welterweight / Rizin Fighting Federation ===
Anpo faced K-1 heavyweight veteran Cyril Abidi, who returned to the sport following a 16-year retirement, in an openweight exhibition bout at Breaking Down 7 on February 19, 2023. He won the fight by a third-round technical knockout.

Anpo faced the two-time K-1 MAX champion Buakaw Banchamek in a super welterweight (−70 kg) bout at Rizin 42 on May 6, 2023. The fight was ruled a draw by unanimous decision. Two judges scored the bout an even 30–30, while the third ringside official awarded Anpo and Buakaw a round each for a 29–29 scorecard.

Anpo faced Sho Patrick Usami at Rizin 44 on September 24, 2023. He won the fight by unanimous decision, with scores of 29–27, 29–26 and 29–26. Anpo was deducted a point in the third round for landing a low blow, as well as for his corner's abusive language directed towards his opponent, but was able to twice knock Usami down in that very same round.

Anpo was expected to face Minoru Kimura at Rizin 45 on December 31, 2023. The fight was called off on November 25, as Kimura tested positive for performance enhancing drugs.

Anpo made his ONE Championship debut against Marat Grigorian at ONE 173 on November 16, 2025.

== Mixed martial arts career ==
Anpo faced former Krush and K-1 welterweight (−67.5 kg) champion Yuta Kubo in a special rules bout at Rizin 45 on December 31, 2023. He lost the bout via rear-naked choke at the end of the first round.

== Titles and accomplishments ==
Amateur

- All Japan Glove Karate Federation
  - 2008 All Japan Glove Karate Federation Middle School Championship
  - 2008 All Japan Glove Karate Federation Middle School Osaka Tournament winner

Professional

- K-1
  - 2019 K-1 Super Lightweight Championship
    - Two successful title defenses
  - 2021 K-1 Welterweight Grand Prix runner-up
- EM Legend
  - 2016 EM Legend World Tournament −65 kg runner-up

Awards

- K-1
  - 2017 K-1 Awards KO of the Year (vs Hiroshi Mizumachi)
  - 2018 K-1 Awards Fight of the Year (vs Hideaki Yamazaki)
  - 2020 K-1 Awards Fight of the Year (vs Hideaki Yamazaki)

== Mixed martial arts record ==
Professional record breakdown
1 match	0 wins	1 loss
By submission	0	1

Res.	Record	Opponent	Method	Event	Date	Round	Time	Location	Notes
Loss	0–1	Yuta Kubo	Submission (rear-naked choke)	Rizin 45	December 31, 2023	1	4:28	Saitama, Japan	Rizin MMA Special rules (2 x 5 minutes).

== Fight record ==
Professional kickboxing and Muay Thai record
27 wins (14 (T)KOs), 9 losses, 1 draw, 0 no contests
Date	Result	Opponent	Event	Location	Method	Round	Time	Record
2026-10-17		(Bulgaria) Bogdan Shumarov	ONE Samurai 4	Tokyo, Japan				
2025-11-16	Loss	(Armenia) Marat Grigorian	ONE 173	Tokyo, Japan	Decision (unanimous)	3	3:00	27–9–1
2023-09-24	Win	(Japan) Sho Patrick Usami	Rizin 44	Saitama, Japan	Decision (unanimous)	3	3:00	27–8–1
2023-05-06	Draw	(Thailand) Buakaw Banchamek	Rizin 42	Tokyo, Japan	Decision (unanimous)	3	3:00	26–8–1
2022-06-19	Win	(Japan) Kosei Yamada	THE MATCH 2022	Tokyo, Japan	Decision (unanimous)	3	3:00	26–8
2022-04-03	Win	(Thailand) Playchumpon Sor.Srisomphong	K-1: K'Festa 5	Tokyo, Japan	KO (left hook to the body)	1	2:17	25–8
2021-12-04	Win	(Japan) Kaito	K-1 World GP 2021 in Osaka	Osaka, Japan	KO (punches)	1	1:52	24–8
2021-09-20	Loss	(Japan) Masaaki Noiri	K-1 World GP 2021: Yokohamatsuri, −67.5 kg Championship Tournament Final	Yokohama, Japan	TKO (three knockdowns)	3	2:51	23–8
For the K-1 Welterweight Championship.
2021-09-20	Win	(Japan) Riki Matsuoka	K-1 World GP 2021: Yokohamatsuri, −67.5 kg Championship Tournament Semi Final	Yokohama, Japan	KO (body shot)	3	2:35	23–7
2021-09-20	Win	(Brazil) Alan Soares	K-1 World GP 2021: Yokohamatsuri, −67.5 kg Championship Tournament Quarter Final	Yokohama, Japan	TKO (two knockdowns)	1	0:31	22–7
2021-07-17	Win	(Japan) Koki	K-1 World GP 2021 in Fukuoka	Fukuoka, Japan	KO (punches)	1	0:53	21–7
2020-09-22	Loss	(Japan) Hideaki Yamazaki	K-1 World GP 2020 in Osaka	Osaka, Japan	KO (left hook)	1	1:18	20–7
Loses the K-1 Super Lightweight Championship.
2020-03-22	Win	(Japan) Fukashi	K-1: K'Festa 3	Saitama, Japan	Decision (unanimous)	3	3:00	20–6
Defends the K-1 Super Lightweight Championship.
2019-12-28	Win	(Thailand) Kaew Fairtex	K-1 World GP 2019 Japan: ～Women's Flyweight Championship Tournament～	Nagoya, Japan	Ext.R decision (unanimous)	4	3:00	19–6
Defends the K-1 Super Lightweight Championship.
2019-06-30	Win	(Thailand) Kaew Fairtex	K-1 World GP 2019: Super Bantamweight World Tournament	Saitama, Japan	Ext.R decision (unanimous)	4	3:00	18–6
Wins the K-1 Super Lightweight Championship.
2019-03-10	Win	(Japan) Daizo Sasaki	K-1 World GP 2019: K'FESTA 2	Saitama, Japan	Decision (unanimous)	3	3:00	17–6
2018-12-08	Win	(Japan) Hideaki Yamazaki	K-1 World GP 2018: K-1 Lightweight World's Strongest Tournament	Osaka, Japan	Ext.R TKO (high kick)	4	0:14	16–6
2018-09-24	Win	(Japan) Kenta Hayashi	K-1 World GP 2018: inaugural Cruiserweight Championship Tournament	Saitama, Japan	KO (right cross)	3	0:44	15–6
2018-06-17	Loss	(Thailand) Kongnapa Weerasakreck	K-1 World GP 2018: 2nd Featherweight Championship Tournament	Saitama, Japan	KO (left cross)	2	1:48	14–6
2017-11-05	Win	(Japan) Kyoshiro	Krush.82	Tokyo, Japan	Decision (unanimous)	3	3:00	14–5
2017-07-16	Win	(China) Deng Zeqi	Krush.77	Tokyo, Japan	KO (flying knee)	1	2:53	13–5
2017-04-01	Win	(China) Wang Zhiwei	Wu Lin Feng 2017: China VS Europe	Zhengzhou, China	Decision	3	3:00	12–5
2017-02-25	Win	(Japan) Hiroshi Mizumachi	K-1 World GP 2017 Lightweight Championship Tournament	Tokyo, Japan	KO (jumping switch kick)	2	0:06	11–5
2016-12-23	Loss	(Thailand) Singmanee Kaewsamrit	Emei Legend 15, 65 kg Tournament, Final	China	Decision	3	3:00	10–5
For the EM Legend World Tournament −65kg title.
2016-12-23	Win	(Russia) Rasul Kachakaev	Emei Legend 15, 65 kg Tournament, semifinal	China	KO (front kick to the body)	3	1:15	10–4
2016-11-03	Win	(Japan) Hisaki Higashimoto	K-1 World GP 2016 Featherweight Championship Tournament	Tokyo, Japan	Decision (unanimous)	3	3:00	9–4
2016-08-20	Loss	(Japan) Hiroto Iwasaki	Krush.68 ～in NAGOYA～	Nagoya, Japan	Ext.R decision (split)	4	3:00	8–4
2016-07-09	Win	(China) Zhao Chuanlin	EM Legend 10, 65 kg Tournament, Quarter Final	Chengdu, China	KO	2		8–3
2016-07-09	Win	(Australia) Alexi Petroulias	EM Legend 10, 65 kg Tournament, First Round	China	Decision (majority)	3	3:00	7–3
2015-10-03	Loss	(Japan) Kaito	SHOOTBOXING THE LAST BOMB	Osaka, Japan	KO (front kick)	2	2:59	6–3
2015-08-01	Win	(Japan) Masaki Hashimoto	BLADE.2 -BLADE FIGHTING CHAMPIONSHIP-	Tokyo, Japan	KO	2	2:12	6–2
2015-02-06	Win	(Japan) Takaki Hosogoe	Krush.51	Tokyo, Japan	Decision (unanimous)	3	3:00	5–2
2012-11-23	Win	(Japan) Go Kato	Krush-EX 2012 vol.6	Tokyo, Japan	Decision (majority)	3	3:00	4–2
2012-08-26	Loss	(Japan) Taishi Hiratsuka	Krush.22 ～in NAGOYA～	Tokyo, Japan	KO (left low kick)	2	2:06	3–2
2011-12-04	Win	(Japan) Yuma Kuraishi	ZIHAD CUP STIR KING 2011, 60 kg tournament Final	Fukuoka, Japan	Decision	3	3:00	3–1
2011-12-04	Win	(Japan)	ZIHAD CUP STIR KING 2011, 60 kg tournament Semi Final	Fukuoka, Japan	KO			2–1
2011-12-04	Win	(Japan)	ZIHAD CUP STIR KING 2011, 60 kg tournament Quarter Final	Fukuoka, Japan	KO			1–1
2011-08-07	Loss	(Japan) Taiju Shiratori	Muay Lok 2011 -3rd-	Tokyo, Japan	Decision	3	3:00	0–1
Legend: Win Loss Draw/no contest Notes

Amateur kickboxing record
Date	Result	Opponent	Event	Location	Method	Round	Time
2011-07-03	Win	(Japan) Ren Morita	WINDY SF	Nagoya, Japan	Decision	2	2:00
2010-04-25	Win	(Japan) Seita Yamato	NEXT LEVEL Chushikoku	Okayama, Japan	Decision (unanimous)	2	2:00
Legend: Win Loss Draw/no contest Notes

== Exhibition kickboxing record ==
Exhibition kickboxing record
Date	Result	Opponent	Event	Location	Method	Round	Time
2024-06-02	Win	(Japan) Tsuyoshi Sudario	Breaking Down 12	Tokyo, Japan	Ext.R decision (unanimous)	4	1:00
2023-02-19	Win	(France) Cyril Abidi	Breaking Down 7	Tokyo, Japan	TKO (punches)	3	
Legend: Win Loss Draw/no contest Notes

== Exhibition boxing record ==
2 fights	1 win	0 losses
By decision	1	0
Draws	1	

No.	Result	Record	Opponent	Type	Round, time	Date	Location	Notes
2	Win	1–0–1	Sina Karimian	UD	6	Dec 31, 2024	Saitama Super Arena, Saitama, Japan	Rizin Special standing bout rules.
1	Draw	0–0–1	Manny Pacquiao	—N/a	3	Jul 28, 2024	Saitama Super Arena, Saitama, Japan	Rizin Special standing bout rules.

== See also ==
- List of male kickboxers
- List of K-1 champions
