= Riki Matsuoka =

Japanese kickboxer

- Born: 松岡 力 November 16, 1993 (age 32); Yawata, Japan
- Height: 177 cm (5 ft 10 in)
- Weight: 67.5 kg (149 lb; 10.63 st)
- Style: Kickboxing
- Stance: Orthodox
- Fighting out of: Tokyo, Japan
- Team: K-1 Gym Gotanda Team Kings (2017-Present); Meguro Fujimoto Gym (2011-2017)
- Years active: 2012 - present

Kickboxing record
- Total: 26
- Wins: 14
- By knockout: 6
- Losses: 10
- By knockout: 5
- Draws: 2

Riki Matsuoka (Japanese: 松岡 力, Matsuoka Riki; born November 16, 1993) is a Japanese kickboxer, currently competing in the welterweight division of K-1. He is the former Krush welterweight champion.

As of April 2023, Combat Press ranks him as the tenth best super featherweight kickboxer in the world.

== Kickboxing career ==
=== Krush ===
Matsuoka made his Krush debut against Toshiki Watanabe at Krush 84 on January 27, 2018. He won the fight by a second-round technical knockout, after thrice knocking Watanabe down. Matsuoka next faced Kazuki Yamagiwa at Krush 87 on April 22, 2018. He won the fight by unanimous decision, with scores of 30–29, 30–28 and 29–28. Matsuoka extended his win-streak to three fights with a unanimous decision win over the two-weight Wu Lin Feng champion Tie Yinghua at Glory of Heroes 32: Huizhou on July 7, 2018.

Matsuoka faced Masaaki Noiri at K-1 World GP 2018: K-1 Lightweight World's Strongest Tournament on December 8, 2018. He lost the fight by a first-round knockout. After suffering his first loss under the Krush banner, Matsuoka was booked to face the former Krush welterweight champion Keita Makihira at Krush 100 on April 19, 2019. He won the fight by unanimous decision. Matsuoka failed to build on this success, as he was stopped by Kaisei Kondo in the first-round of their contest at K-1 World GP 2019: Japan vs World 5 vs 5 & Special Superfight in Osaka on August 24, 2019.

Riki Matsuoka was scheduled to face Kona Kato at Krush 119 on November 27, 2020. Matsuoka was disqualified from the bout at the 2:42 minute mark of the second round, after he threw an illegal knee inside the clinch.

==== Welterweight champion ====
Matsuoka was scheduled to challenge Kona Kato for his Krush Welterweight title in the main event of Krush 124 on April 23, 2021. The bout was a rematch of their November 27, 2020, fight, which ended in a disqualification win for Kato, due to an illegal clinch knee. He won the fight by unanimous decision, with scores of 30–27, 30–27 and 29–28.

Matsuoka faced Duangsompong Maki in the quarterfinals of the 2021 K-1 Welterweight Grand Prix, held at K-1 World GP 2021: Yokohamatsuri on September 20, 2021. He won the fight by a second-round technical knockout. Matsuoka faced Rukiya Anpo in the tournament semifinals. Anpo knocked Matsuoka down in the first round with an overhand right, and controlled the pace of the bout in the second round as well. He upped the pressure in the third round and knocked Matsuoka down twice, with a left hook and a left hook to the body, which once again earned him a technical knockout victory.

==== Title loss ====
Matsuoka was scheduled to make the first defense of his Krush Welterweight against Ayinta Ali at Krush 134 on February 20, 2022. The fight was ruled a split decision draw following the first three rounds. Ali was awarded the split decision victory after an extra round was contested, with two judges scoring the bout 10–9 for him, while the third judge awarded the same scorecard to Matsuoka.

Matsuoka faced Kaito at Krush 147 on March 25, 2023, following a 13-month break from the sport. He won the fight by unanimous decision, with two scorecards of 30–29 and one scorecard of 30–28.

Matsuoka faced Jomthong Strikergym at K-1 ReBIRTH 2 on December 9, 2023. He won the fight by unanimous decision.

== Championships and accomplishments ==
- Krush
  - 2021 Krush Welterweight (-67.5 kg) Championship
- La Nuit des Champions
  - 2024 La Nuit des Champions Welterweight (-66.8 kg) Champion

== Fight record ==
Professional Kickboxing Record
14 Wins (6 (T)KO's), 10 Losses, 2 Draws, 0 No Contest
Date	Result	Opponent	Event	Location	Method	Round	Time
2026-06-21	Loss	(Ukraine) Yulian Pozdniakov	KNOCK OUT.65 ～THE KNOCK OUT 2026～	Tokyo, Japan	KO (Right cross)	2	0:43
2024-11-16	Win	(France) Matthan Choinard	La Nuit des Champions 31	Marseille, France	TKO (Doctor stoppage)	2	
Wins the vacant La Nuit des Champions Welterweight (-66.8 kg) title.
2023-12-09	Win	(Thailand) Jomthong Strikergym	K-1 ReBIRTH 2	Osaka, Japan	Decision (Unanimous)	3	3:00
2023-03-25	Win	(Japan) Kaito	Krush 147	Tokyo, Japan	Decision (Unanimous)	3	3:00
2022-02-20	Loss	(Japan) Ayinta Ali	Krush 134	Tokyo, Japan	Ext.R Decision (Split)	4	3:00
Loses the Krush Welterweight title.
2021-09-20	Loss	(Japan) Rukiya Anpo	K-1 World GP 2021: Yokohamatsuri, -67.5 kg Championship Tournament Semi Final	Yokohama, Japan	KO (Body shot)	3	2:35
2021-09-20	Win	(Thailand) Duangsompong Maki	K-1 World GP 2021: Yokohamatsuri, -67.5 kg Championship Tournament Quarter Final	Yokohama, Japan	TKO (Punches)	2	3:00
2021-04-23	Win	(Japan) Kona Kato	Krush 124	Tokyo, Japan	Decision (Unanimous)	3	3:00
Wins the Krush Welterweight (-67.5 kg) title.
2020-11-27	Loss	(Japan) Kona Kato	Krush 119	Tokyo, Japan	DQ (Illegal knee)	2	2:42
2019-08-24	Loss	(Japan) Kaisei Kondo	K-1 World GP 2019: Japan vs World 5 vs 5 & Special Superfight in Osaka	Osaka, Japan	KO (right cross)	1	2:18
2019-04-19	Win	(Japan) Keita Makihira	Krush 100	Tokyo, Japan	Decision (Unanimous)	3	3:00
2018-12-08	Loss	(Japan) Masaaki Noiri	K-1 World GP 2018: K-1 Lightweight World's Strongest Tournament	Osaka, Japan	KO (Left Hook)	1	1:55
2018-07-07	Win	(China) Tie Yinghua	Glory of Heroes 32: Huizhou	Guangdong, China	Decision (Unanimous)	3	3:00
2018-04-22	Win	(Japan) Kazuki Yamagiwa	Krush 87	Tokyo, Japan	Decision (Unanimous)	3	3:00
2018-01-27	Win	(Japan) Toshiki Watanabe	Krush 84	Tokyo, Japan	TKO (Low kicks)	2	1:16
2016-07-03	Loss	(Japan) Keji Watanabe	SNKA MAGNUM 41	Tokyo, Japan	Decision (Unanimous)	3	3:00
2016-01-10	Loss	(Japan) Masato	SNKA WINNERS 2016	Tokyo, Japan	Ext.R Decision (Unanimous)	4	3:00
2015-07-12	Draw	(Japan) Kenji Watanabe	SNKA MAGNUM 38	Tokyo, Japan	Decision (Majority)	3	3:00
2015-04-19	Win	(Japan) Masataka Maeda	SNKA TITANS NEOS 17	Tokyo, Japan	TKO (Referee stoppage/left hook)	1	3:00
2015-02-11	Loss	(Japan) Kenta	NO KICK NO LIFE 2015	Tokyo, Japan	TKO (Doctor stoppage)	4	2:41
2014-07-20	Draw	(Japan) Eiki	SNKA MAGNUM 35	Tokyo, Japan	Decision (Split)	3	3:00
2014-03-09	Win	(Japan) Shinya Kato	SNKA MAGNUM 34	Tokyo, Japan	TKO (Corner stoppage)	3	0:48
2014-02-11	Win	(Japan) Ryuki Iwashita	NO KICK NO LIFE 2014	Tokyo, Japan	Decision (Unanimous)	3	3:00
2013-03-10	Loss	(Japan) Zen Fujita	Road to Glory Japan 65 kg Tournament Quarter Finals	Tokyo, Japan	TKO (2 Knockdowns rule)	3	1:05
2012-12-09	Win	(Japan) Ueda Rajasaklek	SNKA SOUL IN THE RING IX	Tokyo, Japan	KO	1	1:52
2012-07-22	Win	(Japan) Shohei Ooki	SNKA MAGNUM 29	Tokyo, Japan	Decision (Unanimous)	3	2:00
Legend: Win Loss Draw/No contest Notes

Amateur Kickboxing Record
Date	Result	Opponent	Event	Location	Method	Round	Time
2012-04-15	Win	(Japan) Motoki	Chakuriki Fighting Gala 5	Osaka, Japan	Decision (Majority)	3	3:00
Defends Chakuriki West Japan Lightweight title.
2012-03-17	Loss	(Japan) Yuma Yamaguchi	K-1 Koshien 2012, Tournament 3rd place fight	Tokyo, Japan	KO (Left hook)	1	0:41
2012-03-17	Loss	(Japan) Yuya Shibata	K-1 Koshien 2012, Tournament Semi Final	Tokyo, Japan	Decision (Unanimous)	1	3:00
2012-03-17	Win	(Japan) Daiki Tsunori	K-1 Koshien 2012, Tournament Quarter Final	Tokyo, Japan	Decision	1	3:00
2012-03-17	Win	(Japan) Hiroto Iwasaki	K-1 Koshien 2012, Tournament First Round	Tokyo, Japan	Decision	1	3:00
2010-12-26	Win	(Japan) Tatsuya Morimoto	ACCEL 15	Kobe, Japan	Decision (Unanimous)	3	3:00
2010-11-20	Loss	(Japan) Keigo Ishida	K-1 Koshien 2010 KING OF UNDER 18～FINAL, Tournament Semi Final	Tokyo, Japan	Decision (Majority)	1	2:00
2010-11-20	Win	(Japan) Taisei Kondo	K-1 Koshien 2010 KING OF UNDER 18～FINAL, Tournament Quarter Final	Tokyo, Japan	Ext.R Decision (Split)	2	1:30
2010-11-20	Win	(Japan) Kota Kubo	K-1 Koshien 2010 KING OF UNDER 18～FINAL, Tournament First Round	Tokyo, Japan	KO	1	
2010-09-04	Loss	(Japan) Keigo Ishida	K-1 Koshien 2010 West Japan Selection, Tournament Final	Osaka, Japan	Decision (Unanimous)	1	2:00
2010-09-04	Win	(Japan) Hiroto Yamaguchi	K-1 Koshien 2010 West Japan Selection, Tournament Semi Final	Osaka, Japan	KO	1	
2010-09-04	Win	(Japan) Masahiro Tobino	K-1 Koshien 2010 West Japan Selection, Tournament Quarter Final	Osaka, Japan	Decision (Unanimous)	1	2:00
2010-09-04	Win	(Japan) Katsutaka Nishina	K-1 Koshien 2010 West Japan Selection, Tournament First Round	Osaka, Japan	Decision (Unanimous)	1	2:00
2010-07-04	Win	(Japan) Yuya Inazawa	ACCEL 14	Kobe, Japan	KO (Right cross)	1	0:29
2010-01-24	Win	(Japan) Daiki Oshikawa	NJKF Amateur	Tokyo, Japan	Decision (Unanimous)	2	2:00
Wins the NJKF Amateur -60kg title.
2009-11-08	Win	(Japan) Yusuke Morimitsu	Chakurki Fighting Carnival 2009, Final	Osaka, Japan	KO	2	
Wins the Chakuriki West Japan Lightweight title.
2009-11-08	Win	(Japan) Mitsugu Shibano	Chakurki Fighting Carnival 2009, Semi Final	Osaka, Japan	Decision		
Legend: Win Loss Draw/No contest Notes

== See also ==
- List of male kickboxers
- List of Krush champions
