= Masaaki Noiri =

Japanese kickboxer

- Born: May 11, 1993 (age 33); Nagoya, Japan
- Native name: 野杁 正明
- Height: 1.75 m (5 ft 9 in)
- Weight: 69.5 kg (153 lb; 10.94 st)
- Division: Lightweight; Super Lightweight; Welterweight
- Style: Karate, Kickboxing,
- Stance: Orthodox
- Fighting out of: Tokyo, Japan
- Team: Team Vasileus (2022 – Present); K-1 Gym KREST (2019 – 2022); K-1 Gym Ebisu (2014–2019); Oishi Gym (2000–2014)
- Rank: Black belt in Shin Karate
- Years active: 2007–present

Kickboxing record
- Total: 67
- Wins: 53
- By knockout: 28
- Losses: 14
- By knockout: 2
- Draws: 0

Other information
- Website: https://www.noiri-production.co.jp/

Masaaki Noiri (野杁 正明, Noiri Masaaki; born May 11, 1993) is a Japanese kickboxer, currently competing in the Featherweight Division of ONE Championship, where he is a former interim Featherweight Kickboxing World Champion. He is a two-weight K-1 champion, having held the K-1 World GP Super Lightweight Championship between 2017 and 2018 and the K-1 World GP Welterweight Championship between 2021 and 2024, as well as a one-time Grand Prix winner, having won the 2021 K-1 World Welterweight Grand Prix.

He began practicing karate as a teenager and had great success in both full contact karate and amateur kickboxing in his early teens, which included winning the K-1 Koshien 62 kg (136 lb) schoolboys tournament in 2009, two JKJO titles and a Shin Karate title. After turning professional in 2010, he became a mainstay in the Krush promotion and was victorious in the 2011 Krush Under-22 ~63kg Supernova~ Tournament.

Combat Press ranked him as the No. 1 super-featherweight kickboxer in the world between October 2021 and March 2023. He was then removed from the rankings after he moved to the lightweight division. Combat Press also ranked him among the top ten featherweights continuously from September 2014 to January 2021.

== Personal life & amateur career ==
Masaaki Noiri began kickboxing at a young age because of school bullying. As a schoolboy, Noiri began practicing Shin Karate, a style of full contact karate based on Kyokushin but modified to use boxing gloves and allow punches to the face. He soon became an All Japan Junior Champion in the discipline. On February 25, 2007, at the age of thirteen, Noiri participated in a try-out held by the K-1 kickboxing organization and was taken on as one of Japan's youngest prospects.

Noiri continued to show promise by winning the New Japan Karate Federation's K-2 Lightweight Grand Prix on May 3, 2009. He was then called upon to fight under the K-1 banner on August 10, 2009, at the K-1 Koshien 2009 King of Under 18 Final 16, where he defeated Ryo Murakoshi via knee strike knockout at the opening stage of the K-1 Koshien −62 kg/136 lb high school tournament. Advancing to the quarter-finals at the K-1 World MAX 2009 World Championship Tournament Final on November 26, 2009, Noiri beat Keisuke Miyamoto by unanimous decision.

The final two stages of the tournament were held on December 31, 2009, at Dynamite!! 2009. Noiri was drawn against the previous year's Koshien champion, Hiroya, in the semi-finals and caused an upset by winning a unanimous decision from the judges. He then took another unanimous nod over Shota Shimada in the final to become the K-1 Koshien 2009 King of Under 18 Tournament Champion.

He returned to K-1 Koshien the following year, with all four tournament rounds being held on the same night at the K-1 Koshien 2010 King of Under 18 Final on November 20, 2010. He made it past Naoki Takeda with a unanimous decision victory in the first round, but was then eliminated by Keigo Ishida via decision at the quarter-finals.

Outside of kickboxing, Masaaki Noiri likes to spend time with his kids, eat food, and play games.

== Professional kickboxing career ==
=== Lightweight ===
==== Early career ====
Noiri debuted as a professional kickboxer on March 14, 2010, in his home town of Nagoya, defeating Shinji Aseishi by unanimous decision. Following this, he was recruited by Krush and went 3–0 in the promotion, including two KO wins, before entering the Krush First Generation King Tournament at −60 kg/132 lb which began on December 12, 2010. He was victorious over Junpei Aotsu in the tournament's first round but was then defeated by Yuji Takeuchi in the quarter-finals on April 30, 2011. Noiri floored Takeuchi in the second round and again at the beginning of the third when both men knocked each other down with concurrent left hooks. Takeuchi, knowing that he had to stop Noiri to win the fight, came back aggressively towards the end of the fight, however, and violently knocked Noiri out with a left hook to send him crashing out of the tournament.

Despite having recently suffering the first loss of his professional career, Noiri was invited to the K-1 World MAX 2011 –63 kg Japan Tournament Final, a one-night tournament made up of eight of Japan's best lightweights, on June 25, 2011. He faced a tough test in the quarter-finals against the more experienced Ryuji Kajiwara. The bout was called a draw after three rounds and so an extension round was added to decide the winner, after which Noiri was given a close split decision. In the semis, he went up against the previous year's runner-up in Yuta Kubo and came out on the losing side of a unanimous decision.

==== Supernova tournament ====
He then returned to Krush to compete in the 2011 Under-22 ~63 kg Supernova~ Tournament. After finishing both Violence and Daizo Sasaki in the same night on October 10, 2011, Noiri advanced to the tournament's final stage held at Krush.14 on December 9, 2011. The semi-finals saw Noiri rematch Hiroya and cruise to a unanimous decision (30–27, 30–28, 30–28) after sending his opponent to the canvas in round one. In the final, he went up against Koya Urabe and ended the fight with one of the year's most impressive knockouts. After nullifying Urabe's superior boxing, he landed with a flying knee that ended Urabe's night towards the end of the first round, crowning him the tournament winner.

Noiri ended the year with a unanimous decision victory over Kengo Sonoda at Fight For Japan: Genki Desu Ka Omisoka 2011 on December 31, 2011. To kick off 2012, he bested his first international opponent, Frenchman Cedric Peynaud, with a unanimous decision (30–28, 29–28, 29–28) at Krush.17 on March 17, 2012.

==== Move up in weight ====
On May 20, 2012, Noiri ventured up to 64 kg/141 lb limit to face Raz Sarkisjan at the Hoost Cup. The previously unknown Dutch-Armenian fighter scored a major upset with a unanimous decision win, flooring Noiri twice in the second round before getting dropped himself in the third. Three months later, Noiri returned to 63 kg/138 lb and bounced back with a unanimous points (30–27, 30–27, 30–28) win over Makihira Keita at Krush.22.

The end of 2012 saw lightweight's previous kingpin Yuta Kubo move up in weight, and so Noiri then took his place as number one in the world rankings. This despite his loss to Sarkisjan which took place at 64 kg/141 lb, technically outside the lightweight limit of 63.5 kg/140 lb. He solidified his place as the world's top lightweight with a unanimous decision (30–28, 29–27, 29–28) win over Yetkin Ozkul at Krush.24 in Tokyo on November 10, 2012. After an even first two rounds, Noiri dropped Ozkul with a flying knee in the final round, securing a victory. He then dominated Makoto Nishiyama en route to a second round referee stoppage in a non-tournament bout at the Krush Grand Prix 2013 ~67kg First Class Tournament~ on January 14, 2013.

=== Super lightweight ===
==== Glory ====
Moving up to the super lightweight division, Noiri was invited to the Road to Glory Japan −65kg Slam on March 10, 2013, and had his rubber match with Hiroya in the quarter-finals. This fight was much closer than their first two affairs as Noiri was only able to pick up a majority decision due to a point deduction for low blows to Hiroya, resulting in scores of 30–29, 30–29 and 29–29. He struggled again in the semis, but came out with another majority decision over Yukihiro Komiya. In the tournament final, he was much more dominant as he floored Yuki twice in round one and twice again in two, forcing the referee to stop the bout.

This tournament win qualified him for the Glory 8: Tokyo - 2013 65kg Slam event on May 3, 2013, the tournament made up of the world's eight top 65 kg kickboxers. In the quarter-finals, he defeated Liam Harrison via TKO due to a cut in round two, and in the semis he outpointed Mosab Amrani. He faced fellow Japanese native Yuta Kubo in a rematch in the final. He suffered a brutal low blow in the first round and wasn't able to rally back until the third. It was too late by that time, however, and he lost the decision.

==== Return to Krush ====
In his first match under Muay Thai rules, Noiri knocked out Seiji Takahashi with a third round front kick to the face for the vacant World Boxing Council Muaythai Japan Super Lightweight (−63.503 kg/140 lb) Championship at a New Japan Kickboxing Federation event on July 15, 2013.

Noiri had his rubber match with Yuta Kubo at Krush.32 in Nagoya on September 1, 2013, defeating Kubo for the first time in three attempts to take his Krush 67 kg/147 lb title and put an end to his seventeen fight win streak in the process. The bout was relatively one-sided in favour of Noiri and saw Kubo deducted a point in round three for extensive clinching, allowing Noiri to take a wide unanimous decision.

Noiri challenged Tetsuya Yamato for his WBC Muaythai International Super Lightweight Championship at an NJKF event in Tokyo on February 16, 2014. He lost the fight by a unanimous decision, with scores of 49–47, 50–47 and 49–48.

Noiri faced Atsushi Ogata at Krush 48 on December 21, 2014. He won the fight by a first-round knockout. Noiri next faced the Enfusion -67 kg champion Ilias Bulaid at Krush 51 on February 6, 2015. He won the fight by unanimous decision, with all three judges scoring the bout 30–27 in his favor. His two fight win streak was snapped by Massaro Glunder however, who stopped him 40 seconds into the second round at K-1 World GP 2016 -65kg World Tournament on June 24, 2015, in the quarterfinals of the 2015 K-1 super lightweight Grand Prix.

Noiri faced Hideaki Yamazaki at Krush.57 in NAGOYA on August 22, 2015. He won the fight by unanimous decision, after an extra fourth round was contested. Noiri next faced Yasuomi Soda at K-1 World GP 2015 The Championship on November 21, 2015. He won the fight by unanimous decision, with two scorecards of 30–28 and one scorecard of 30–29.

==== Super lightweight Grand Prix ====
On January 10, 2016, it was announced that Noiri would be one of eight participants in the 2016 K-1 Super lightweight (-65 kg) Grand Prix, which was scheduled to take place on March 4, 2016. Noiri faced Minoru Kimura in the quarterfinals of the one-day tournament and was able to overcome the Brazilian fighter by a first-round knockout, flooring Kumura with a flying knee with just six seconds left in the opening round. Noiri advanced to the semifinals, where he faced the one-time Krush super lightweight champion Hiroya. He won the fight by majority decision, with two judges scoring the bout 29–27 and 29–28 in his favor, while the third ringside official had it scored as an even 28–28 draw. Noiri faced Hideaki Yamazaki in the finals, a rematch of their August 22, 2015 encounter, which Noiri won by unanimous decision. He was less successful in their second meeting, as Yamazaki won both the fight and the title by majority decision.

His success in the Japan Grand Prix earned him a place in the K-1 World Super lightweight Grand Prix as well, which took place on June 24, 2016. Noiri faced Massaro Glunder in the quarterfinals. He avenged his previous defeat to Glunder, as we won the fight by unanimous decision, with two scorecards of 30–28 and one scorecard of 30–26. Glunder was twice deducted a point to excessive holding, one in the second and one in the third round. Noiri faced the two-time K-1 Grand Prix winner Kaew Fairtex in the semifinals. He lost the fight by unanimous decision, with scores of 29–28, 30–29 and 29–28.

==== Super lightweight champion ====
Noiri faced the Wu Lin Feng Rookie of the Year Wang Pengfei at Krush 68 on August 20, 2016. He won the fight by a first-round knockout. After he successfully bounced back from his loss to Kaew, Noiri faced Eddy Nait Slimani for the vacant Nuit Des Champions -66 kg championship at "Nuit Des Champions 2016" on November 16, 2019, in what was his first fight outside of Japan. He captured the title with a second round stoppage of the Frenchman.

Noiri returned to K-1 to face Younes Smaili at K-1 World GP 2017 Lightweight Championship Tournament on February 25, 2017. Noiri then challenged Kaew Fairtex for the K-1 World GP Super Lightweight (-65 kg) Championship at K-1 World GP 2017 Super Middleweight Championship Tournament on June 18, 2017. He won the fight by split decision, after an extra fourth round was contested. Noiri faced Diego Freitas in a non-title bout at Krush 79 on August 20, 2017. He won the fight by a second-round knockout.

Noiri made his first NDC -66 kg title defense against Abdellah Ezbiri at "Nuit Des Champions 2017" on November 25, 2017. He lost the fight by unanimous decision.

Noiri made his first K-1 Super lightweight championship defense against Tetsuya Yamato at K-1 World GP 2018: K'FESTA.1 on March 21, 2018. Yamato previously beat Noiri by unanimous decision in a muay thai rules bout on February 16, 2014. He wasn't able to replicate that success in K-1 however, as Noiri won the fight by a third-round knockout.

Noiri would fight at super lightweight twice more before moving up to welterweight (67.5 kg). He first stopped Vincent Foschiani with a left hook to the body at the 2:45 minute mark of the second round. Noiri followed this up with a first-round head kick knockout of Yang Haodong at Krush 92 on August 18, 2018.

=== Welterweight ===
==== Move up in weight ====
Noiri faced Riki Matsuoka at K-1 World GP 2018: K-1 Lightweight World's Strongest Tournament on December 8, 2018. He won the fight by a first-round knockout. Noiri next faced the Krush Super Welterweight champion Jordann Pikeur at K-1 World GP 2019: K’FESTA 2 on March 10, 2019. He lost the fight by unanimous decision.

Noiri rebounded from this loss by winning his next four fights: he beat Sami Lamiri by a second-round knockout at K-1 World GP 2019: Japan vs World 5 vs 5 & Special Superfight in Osaka on August 24, 2019, Hasan Toy by majority decision at K-1 World GP 2019 Japan: ～Women's Flyweight Championship Tournament～ on December 28, 2019, David Mejia at K-1 World GP 2020: K’Festa 3 on March 22, 2020, and Vitor Tofanelli by unanimous decision at K-1 World GP 2020 in Fukuoka on November 3, 2020.

Noiri was expected to fight Yodkhunpon Sitmonchai at K-1: K’Festa 4, but the event was later postponed due to the COVID-19 pandemic. He was instead rescheduled to face Playchumphon Sor.Srisomphong at K-1 World GP 2021: K’Festa 4 Day.2. He won the fight by unanimous decision.

==== K-1 welterweight champion ====
Noiri was expected to face Kona Kato in the quarterfinal bout of the K-1 welterweight World Grand Prix, held at K-1 World GP 2021: Yokohamatsuri on September 20, 2021. As Kato later withdrew due to COVID-19 related problems, Noiri was rescheduled to face FUMIYA. He made quick work of FUMIYA, as he floored the journeyman with a right hook at the 2:10 minute mark of the opening round. Noiri faced the undefeated Krush Welterweight champion Ayinta Ali in the penultimate bout of the tournament. He needed just 92 seconds to knock Ayinta down twice for a technical knockout victory. Noiri faced the former K-1 Super Lightweight champion Rukiya Anpo in the finals of the one-day tournament. Following an evenly contested first two rounds, Noiri was able to knock Anpo down three times in the final round of the bout for his third stoppage win of the evening.

Noiri was booked to face Kona Kato at K-1: K'Festa 5 on April 3, 2022, in a non-title bout. He won the fight by second-round knockout, after knocking Kato down once in the previous round.

Noiri faced the former Shoot boxing Super Lightweight champion and the 2018 SHOOT BOXING S-Cup World Tournament winner Kaito Ono at The Match 2022 on June 19, 2022. He lost the fight by an extra round unanimous decision.

Noiri faced the 148-fight veteran Dzhabar Askerov at K-1 World GP 2023: K'Festa 6 on March 12, 2023. He won the fight by a first-round knockout.

Noiri faced the reigning SUPERKOMBAT Middleweight Champion Amansio Paraschiv in a catchweight bout at K-1 World GP 2023 on July 17, 2023. He won the fight by a first-round body-kick knockout.

=== ONE Championship ===
Noiri announced his departure from K-1 on March 27, 2024. On April 23, 2024, it was announced that Noiri signed with ONE Championship.

Noiri made his promotional debut against Sitthichai Sitsongpeenong on June 8, 2024, at ONE 167. He lost the fight via unanimous decision.

Noiri was scheduled to face Youssef Challouki on December 20, 2024, at ONE Friday Fights 92. However, Challouki pulled out from the event for he allegedly sending inappropriate messages to minors. He was replaced by Liu Mengyang. He lost the fight via unanimous decision.

Noiri faced Shakir Al-Tekreeti on January 24, 2025, at ONE 170. He won the fight via knockout in the round two.

Noiri faced Tawanchai P.K.Saenchai for the interim ONE Featherweight Kickboxing World Championship on March 23, 2025, at ONE 172. He won the fight via technical knockout in round three upset.

== Championships and awards ==
=== Karate ===
- Japan Karate Judge Organization
  - 2006 JKJO Karate-Do MAC Japan Cup Elementary School 3rd place
  - 2007 JKJO All Japan Junior Championship Middle School -55 kg Winner
- Shin Karate
  - 2009 Shin Karate All Japan K-2 Grand Prix Lightweight Champion

=== Kickboxing ===
- Glory
  - 2013 Road to Glory Japan 65 kg Tournament Winner
  - 2013 Glory −65kg Slam Tournament Runner-up
- K-1
  - 2009 K-1 Koshien King of Under 18 Tournament Winner
  - 2016 K-1 World GP Japan Super Lightweight (-65 kg) Grand Prix Runner-up
  - 2017 K-1 World GP Super Lightweight (-65 kg) Championship
  - 2021 K-1 World GP World Welterweight (-67.5 kg) Grand Prix Winner
  - 2021 K-1 World GP Welterweight (-67.5kg) Championship
- Krush
  - 2011 Krush Under-22 ~63kg Supernova~ Tournament Winner
  - 2013 Krush Welterweight Championship
- La Nuit des Champions
  - 2016 La Nuit des Champions 66 kg Champion
- ONE Championship
  - 2025 interim ONE Featherweight Kickboxing World Championship

=== Muay thai ===
- World Boxing Council Muaythai
  - WBC Muaythai Japan Super Lightweight (−63.503 kg/140 lb) Championship

=== Awards ===
- eFight.jp
  - 4x Fighter of the Month (July 2013, September 2021, January 2025, March 2025)
- K-1
  - 2021 K-1 Fighter of the Year

== Kickboxing record ==
Kickboxing record
53 Wins (28 (T)KO's), 14 Losses, 0 Draws
Date	Result	Opponent	Event	Location	Method	Round	Time	Record
		(Armenia) Marat Grigorian						
ONE Samurai Featherweight Kickboxing Tournament Final.
2026-10-17	Win	(Iran) Mohammad Siasarani	ONE Samurai 4	Tokyo, Japan	Decision (Split)	3	3:00	53–14
ONE Samurai Featherweight Kickboxing Tournament Semifinal.
2026-08-08	Win	(China) Liu Mengyang	ONE Samurai 2	Tokyo, Japan	KO (Punches)	1	2;59	52–14
ONE Samurai Featherweight Kickboxing Tournament Quarterfinal.
2025-11-16	Loss	(Thailand) Superbon Singha Mawynn	ONE 173	Tokyo, Japan	Decision (Unanimous)	5	3:00	51–14
For the ONE Featherweight Kickboxing World Championship.
2025-03-23	Win	(Thailand) Tawanchai P.K. Saenchaimuaythaigym	ONE 172	Saitama, Japan	TKO (Referee Stoppage)	3	1:55	51–13
Wins the interim ONE Featherweight Kickboxing World Championship.
2025-01-24	Win	(Iraq) Shakir Al-Tekreeti	ONE 170	Bangkok, Thailand	KO (Low kick)	2	0:14	50–13
2024-12-20	Loss	(China) Liu Mengyang	ONE Friday Fights 92, Lumpinee Stadium	Bangkok, Thailand	Decision (Unanimous)	3	3:00	49–13
2024-06-08	Loss	(Thailand) Sitthichai Sitsongpeenong	ONE 167	Bangkok, Thailand	Decision (Unanimous)	3	3:00	49–12
2023-07-17	Win	(Romania) Amansio Paraschiv	K-1 World GP 2023	Tokyo, Japan	KO (Body kick)	1	1:33	49–11
2023-03-12	Win	(Russia) Dzhabar Askerov	K-1 World GP 2023: K'Festa 6	Tokyo, Japan	KO (Right straight)	1	2:00	48–11
2022-06-19	Loss	(Japan) Kaito Ono	THE MATCH 2022	Tokyo, Japan	Ext.R Decision (Unanimous)	4	3:00	47–11
2022-04-03	Win	(Japan) Kona Kato	K-1: K'Festa 5	Tokyo, Japan	KO (Uppercut)	2	2:17	47–10
2021-09-20	Win	(Japan) Rukiya Anpo	K-1 World GP 2021: Yokohamatsuri -67.5 kg Championship Tournament, Final	Yokohama, Japan	TKO (Three knockdowns)	3	2:51	46–10
Wins the K-1 World GP Welterweight (-67.5kg) Championship.
2021-09-20	Win	(Japan) Ali Ayinta	K-1 World GP 2021: Yokohamatsuri -67.5 kg Championship Tournament, Semi Final	Yokohama, Japan	TKO (Two knockdowns)	1	1:32	45–10
2021-09-20	Win	(Japan) FUMIYA	K-1 World GP 2021: Yokohamatsuri -67.5 kg Championship Tournament, Quarter Final	Yokohama, Japan	KO (Right hook)	1	2:10	44–10
2021-03-28	Win	(Thailand) Playchumphon Sor.Srisomphong	K-1 World GP 2021: K’Festa 4 Day.2	Yoyogi, Japan	Decision (Unanimous)	3	3:00	43–10
2020-11-03	Win	(Brazil) Vitor Toffanelli	K-1 World GP 2020 in Fukuoka	Fukuoka, Japan	Decision (Unanimous)	3	3:00	42–10
2020-03-22	Win	(Spain) David Mejia	K-1 World GP 2020: K’Festa 3	Saitama, Japan	Decision (Unanimous)	3	3:00	41–10
2019-12-28	Win	(Turkey) Hasan Toy	K-1 World GP 2019 Japan: ～Women's Flyweight Championship Tournament～	Nagoya, Japan	Decision (Majority)	3	3:00	40–10
2019-08-24	Win	(Switzerland) Sami Lamiri	K-1 World GP 2019: Japan vs World 5 vs 5 & Special Superfight in Osaka	Osaka, Japan	KO (Body Punches)	2	2:35	39–10
2019-03-10	Loss	(Netherlands) Jordann Pikeur	K-1 World GP 2019: K’FESTA 2	Saitama, Japan	Decision (Unanimous)	3	3:00	38–10
2018-12-08	Win	(Japan) Riki Matsuoka	K-1 World GP 2018: K-1 Lightweight World's Strongest Tournament	Osaka, Japan	KO (Left Hook)	1	1:55	38–9
2018-08-18	Win	(China) Yang Haodong	Krush 92	Japan	KO (Left High Kick)	1	2:59	37–9
2018-06-17	Win	(Germany) Vincent Foschiani	K-1 World GP 2018: 2nd Featherweight Championship Tournament	Saitama, Japan	KO (Left Hook to the Body)	2	2:45	36–9
2018-03-21	Win	(Japan) Tetsuya Yamato	K-1 World GP 2018: K'FESTA.1	Saitama, Japan	KO (Punches)	3	2:55	35–9
Defends the K-1 World GP Super Lightweight (-65 kg) Championship.
2017-11-25	Loss	(France) Abdellah Ezbiri	Nuit Des Champions 2017	Marseille, France	Decision (unanimous)	5	3:00	34–9
Loses the La Nuit De Champions −66kg Belt.
2017-08-20	Win	(Portugal) Diego Freitas	Krush 79	Japan	KO (Right High Kick)	2	1:14	34–8
2017-06-18	Win	(Thailand) Kaew Fairtex	K-1 World GP 2017 Super Middleweight Championship Tournament	Tokyo, Japan	Ext. R. Decision (Split)	4	3:00	33–8
Wins the K-1 World GP Super Lightweight (-65 kg) Championship.
2017-02-25	Win	(Netherlands) Younes Smaili	K-1 World GP 2017 Lightweight Championship Tournament	Saitama, Japan	Decision (Unanimous)	3	3:00	32–8
2016-11-19	Win	(France) Eddy Nait Slimani	Nuit Des Champions 2016	Marseille, France	KO (Left Knee to The Body)	3	2:57	31–8
Wins the vacant La Nuit De Champions −66kg Belt.
2016-08-20	Win	(China) Wang Pengfei	Krush 68	Tokyo, Japan	KO (Left Middle Kick)	1	1:37	30–8
2016-06-24	Loss	(Thailand) Kaew Fairtex	K-1 World GP 2016 -65kg World Tournament, Semi Finals	Tokyo, Japan	Decision (unanimous)	3	3:00	29–8
2016-06-24	Win	(Netherlands) Massaro Glunder	K-1 World GP 2016 -65kg World Tournament, Quarter Finals	Tokyo, Japan	Decision (unanimous)	3	3:00	29–7
2016-03-04	Loss	(Japan) Hideaki Yamazaki	K-1 World GP 2016 -65kg Japan Tournament, Final	Tokyo, Japan	Decision (majority)	3	3:00	28–7
For the K-1 World GP Japan Super Lightweight (-65 kg) Grand Prix title.
2016-03-04	Win	(Japan) Hiroya	K-1 World GP 2016 -65kg Japan Tournament, Semi Finals	Tokyo, Japan	Decision (majority)	3	3:00	28–6
2016-03-04	Win	(Brazil) Minoru Kimura	K-1 World GP 2016 -65kg Japan Tournament, Quarter Finals	Tokyo, Japan	KO (Jumping knee)	1	2:54	27–6
2015-11-21	Win	(Japan) Yasuomi Soda	K-1 World GP 2015 The Championship	Tokyo, Japan	Decision (unanimous)	3	3:00	26–6
2015-08-22	Win	(Japan) Hideaki Yamazaki	Krush.57 in NAGOYA	Nagoya, Japan	Ext.R Decision(Unanimous)	4	3:00	25-6
2015-04-19	Loss	(Netherlands) Massaro Glunder	K-1 World GP 2015 -55kg Championship Tournament	Tokyo, Japan	TKO (Doctor Stoppage)	2	0:40	24–6
2015-02-06	Win	(Morocco) Ilias Bulaid	Krush 51	Tokyo, Japan	Decision (unanimous)	3	3:00	24–5
2014-12-21	Win	(Japan) Atsushi Ogata	Krush 48	Sendai, Japan	KO (Knee & punches)	1	2:50	23–5
2014-02-16	Loss	(Japan) Tetsuya Yamato	NJKF	Tokyo, Japan	Decision (unanimous)	5	3:00	22–5
For the World Boxing Council Muaythai International Super Lightweight (−63.5 kg/140 lb) Championship.
2013-09-01	Win	(Japan) Yuta Kubo	Krush.32	Nagoya, Japan	Decision (unanimous)	3	3:00	22–4
Wins the Krush Welterweight Championship.
2013-07-15	Win	(Japan) Seiji Takahashi	NJKF	Tokyo, Japan	KO (right front kick)	3	1:17	21–4
Wins the World Boxing Council Muaythai Japan Super Lightweight (−63.503 kg/140 lb) Championship.
2013-05-03	Loss	(Japan) Yuta Kubo	Glory 8: Tokyo – 65 kg Slam Tournament, Final	Tokyo, Japan	Decision (unanimous)	3	3:00	20–4
For the Glory -65kg Slam Tournament.
2013-05-03	Win	(Morocco) Mosab Amrani	Glory 8: Tokyo -65 kg Slam Tournament, Semi Finals	Tokyo, Japan	Decision (unanimous)	3	3:00	20–3
2013-05-03	Win	(England) Liam Harrison	Glory 8: Tokyo – 65 kg Slam Tournament, Quarter Finals	Tokyo, Japan	TKO (cut)	2		19–3
2013-03-10	Win	(Japan) Yuki	Road to Glory Japan 65 kg Tournament, Final	Tokyo, Japan	TKO (referee stoppage)	2	1:35	18–3
Wins the Road to Glory Japan 65kg Tournament.
2013-03-10	Win	(Japan) Yukihiro Komiya	Road to Glory Japan 65 kg Tournament, Semi Finals	Tokyo, Japan	Decision (majority)	3	3:00	17–3
2013-03-10	Win	(Japan) Hiroya	Road to Glory Japan 65 kg Tournament, Quarter Finals	Tokyo, Japan	Decision (majority)	3	3:00	16–3
2013-01-14	Win	(Japan) Makoto Nishiyama	Krush Grand Prix 2013 ~67 kg First Class Tournament~	Tokyo, Japan	TKO (referee stoppage)	2	1:56	15–3
2012-11-10	Win	(Turkey) Yetkin Ozkul	Krush.24	Tokyo, Japan	Decision (unanimous)	3	3:00	14–3
2012-08-26	Win	(Japan) Makihira Keita	Krush.22	Nagoya, Japan	Decision (unanimous)	3	3:00	13–3
2012-05-20	Loss	(Armenia) Raz Sarkisjan	Hoost Cup	Nagoya, Japan	Decision (unanimous)	3	3:00	12–3
2012-03-17	Win	(France) Cedric Peynaud	Krush.17	Tokyo, Japan	Decision (unanimous)	3	3:00	12–2
2011-12-31	Win	(Japan) Kengo Sonoda	Fight For Japan: Genki Desu Ka Omisoka 2011	Saitama, Japan	Decision (unanimous)	3	3:00	11–2
2011-12-09	Win	(Japan) Koya Urabe	Krush.14, 2011 Under-22 ~63 kg Supernova~ Tournament Final	Tokyo, Japan	KO (left flying knee)	1	2:58	10–2
Wins the Krush Under-22 ~63kg Supernova~ Tournament title.
2011-12-09	Win	(Japan) Hiroya	Krush.14, 2011 Under-22 ~63 kg Supernova~ Tournament Semi Finals	Tokyo, Japan	Decision (unanimous)	3	3:00	9–2
2011-10-10	Win	(Japan) Daizo Sasaki	Krush 2011 Under-22 ~63 kg Supernova~ Tournament, Quarter Finals	Tokyo, Japan	KO (left hook to the body)	2	1:42	8–2
2011-10-10	Win	(Japan) Ranbo	Krush 2011 Under-22 ~63 kg Supernova~ Tournament, First Round	Tokyo, Japan	KO (right knee)	3	1:25	7–2
2011-06-25	Loss	(Japan) Yuta Kubo	K-1 World MAX 2011 –63 kg Japan Tournament Final, Semi Finals	Tokyo, Japan	Decision (unanimous)	3	3:00	6–2
2011-06-25	Win	(Japan) Ryuji Kajiwara	K-1 World MAX 2011 –63 kg Japan Tournament Final, Quarter Finals	Tokyo, Japan	Extension round decision (split)	4	3:00	6–1
2011-04-30	Loss	(Japan) Yuji Takeuchi	Krush First Generation King Tournament, Quarter Finals	Tokyo, Japan	KO (left hook)	3	1:51	5–1
2010-12-12	Win	(Japan) Junpei Aotsu	Krush First Generation King Tournament, First Round	Tokyo, Japan	Decision (unanimous)	3	3:00	5–0
2010-09-20	Win	(Japan) Hirotaka Urabe	Krush.10	Tokyo, Japan	Decision (unanimous)	3	3:00	4–0
2010-06-12	Win	(Japan) Yoshihiro Shirakami	Krush-EX ~ Next Generation Fight 2010 vol.2 ~	Tokyo, Japan	KO (left straight to the body)	3	2:37	3–0
2010-04-29	Win	(Japan) Sol de Tigre Yosuke	Krush.6	Tokyo, Japan	KO (right flying knee)	2	1:29	2–0
2010-03-14	Win	(Japan) Shinji Aseishi	Nagoya Kick: Central Rhythm	Nagoya, Japan	Decision (unanimous)	3	3:00	1–0

Amateur kickboxing record
Date	Result	Opponent	Event	Location	Method	Round	Time
2010-11-20	Loss	(Japan) Keigo Ishida	K-1 Koshien 2010 King of Under 18 Final, Quarter Finals	Tokyo, Japan	Decision (unanimous)	1	2:00
2010-11-20	Win	(Japan) Naoki Takeda	K-1 Koshien 2010 King of Under 18 Final, First Round	Tokyo, Japan	Decision (unanimous)	1	2:00
2009-12-31	Win	(Japan) Shota Shimada	Dynamite!! 2009, K-1 Koshien 2009 King of Under 18, Final	Saitama, Japan	Decision (unanimous)	3	2:00
Wins the K-1 Koshien 2009 King of Under 18 62kg (136lb) Tournament title.
2009-12-31	Win	(Japan) Hiroya	Dynamite!! 2009, K-1 Koshien 2009 King of Under 18, Semi Finals	Saitama, Japan	Decision (unanimous)	3	2:00
2009-10-26	Win	(Japan) Keisuke Miyamoto	K-1 World MAX 2009 World Championship Tournament Final, K-1 Koshien 2009 King of Under 18, Quarter Finals	Yokohama, Japan	Decision (unanimous)	3	2:00
2009-08-10	Win	(Japan) Ryo Murakoshi	K-1 Koshien 2009 King of Under 18 Round of 16	Japan	KO (right knee)	3	0:59
2009-07-04	Win	(Japan) Yamato Kojima	K-1 Koshien 2009 King of Under 18 Round of 32	Chubu, Japan	Decision( Unanimous)	3	2:00
2008-12-06	Win	(Japan) Takeno Ren	Fighting Road Cup Double Impact	Tokyo, Japan	Decision (Unanimous)	3	2:00
2008-07-13	Draw	(Japan) Sakai Raku	HEAT 7 "New Age Fight"	Tokyo, Japan	Decision (Unanimous)	2	2:00
2007-12-22	Draw	(Japan) Daizo Sasaki	Team Dragon "Burning Dragon! Part 1" Amateur Challenge Match	Tokyo, Japan	Decision (Unanimous)	1	3:00
2007-10-28	Win	(Japan) Tomokazu Hiroiki	6th BRIDGE one match challenge	Tokyo, Japan	KO		
Legend: Win Loss Draw/No contest Notes

== See also ==
- List of male kickboxers
- List of K-1 champions
- List of Krush champions
