= Kona Kato =

Japanese kickboxer

- Born: 加藤虎於奈; March 21, 1996 (age 30); Iruma, Saitama, Japan
- Nickname: The Natural
- Nationality: Japanese
- Height: 180 cm (5 ft 11 in)
- Weight: 67.5 kg (149 lb; 10.63 st)
- Style: Kickboxing
- Stance: Orthodox
- Fighting out of: Tagajō, Miyagi Prefecture, Japan
- Team: Team Top Zeros/Lara Tokyo
- Years active: 2017 - present

Kickboxing record
- Total: 11
- Wins: 7
- By knockout: 3
- Losses: 4
- By knockout: 1

Other information
- Notable relatives: Leona Pettas (brother)

Kona Kato (Japanese: 加藤虎於奈, Kato Kona; born March 23, 1996) is a Japanese kickboxer, currently competing in the welterweight division of K-1. A professional competitor since 2017, Kato is the former Krush welterweight champion.

As of September 2022, Combat Press ranks him as the tenth best super featherweight kickboxer in the world.

== Kickboxing career ==
=== Early career ===
Kato made his professional debut against Kaito at Krush 83 on December 9, 2017. He won the fight by a first-round technical knockout. This victory earned Kato his K-1 debut, which took place against Ruku Kojima at K-1 World GP 2018: K'FESTA.1 on March 21, 2018. He lost the fight by a narrow unanimous decision, with scores of 30–29, 30–29 and 29–29.

After suffering his first professional loss, Kato was booked to face Kazuma Takekoshi at Krush 90 on July 22, 2018. He won the fight by a first-round technical knockout. Kato next face Kaito in a rematch at Krush 97 on January 26, 2019. He won the fight by unanimous decision, with scores of 30–28, 30–26 and 30–27. Kato's two-fight winning streak was snapped by Chunyu Zhang, who beat him by unanimous decision at K-1 KRUSH FIGHT 103 on July 21, 2019.

Kato faced the former Krush welterweight titleholder and two-time welterweight title challenger Keita Makihira at K-1 KRUSH FIGHT 109 on December 15, 2019. He won the fight by a second-round technical knockout.

Kato was expected to face Riki Matsuoka at Krush 116 on August 29, 2020, in the semifinals of the 2020 Krush welterweight tournament. He was forced to withdraw due to undisclosed reasons and was replaced by Kazuki Yamagiwa. Kato was rescheduled to face Riki Matsuoka at Krush 119 on November 27, 2020. Matsuoka was disqualified from the bout at the 2:42 minute mark of the second round, after he threw an illegal knee inside of the clinch.

=== Krush welterweight champion ===
His two-fight winning streak earned Kato the right to challenge the reigning Krush Welterweight (-67.5 kg) champion Kazuki Yamagiwa, in what was the champion's first title defense. The title bout headlined Krush 121, which took place at the Korakuen Hall in Tokyo, Japan on January 23, 2021. He won the fight by unanimous decision, with two judges scoring it 30–26 for Kato, while the last judge scored the bout 30–27 in his favor. Kato knocked his opponent down with a left hook late in the third round, but was unable to finish him before the fight ended.

Kato made his first Krush title defense against Riki Matsuoka in the main event of Krush 124 on April 23, 2021. The bout was a rematch of their November 27, 2020, fight, which ended in a disqualification win for Kato, due to an illegal clinch knee. He failed to repeat his success however, as Matsuoka won the fight by unanimous decision, with scores of 30–27, 30–27 and 29–28.

=== Post title reign ===
Kato was expected to face the former K-1 World GP Super Lightweight Champion Masaaki Noiri in the quarterfinals of the 2021 K-1 Welterweight World Grand Prix at K-1 World GP 2021: Yokohamatsuri on September 20, 2021. He was forced to withdraw after contracting COVID-19 and was replaced by FUMIYA. Kota was rescheduled to face Noiri, the newly crowned K-1 welterweight champion, at K-1: K'Festa 5 on April 3, 2022. He lost the fight by a second-round technical knockout, as his corner threw in the towel in the final minute of the round. It was the first stoppage loss of Kato's professional career.

Kato faced Koki at Krush 146 on February 25, 2023. He won the fight by unanimous decision, with scores of 30–28, 29–28 and 29–27.

== Championships and accomplishments ==
=== Professional ===
- Krush
  - Krush Welterweight (-67.5 kg) Championship

=== Amateur ===
- 2013 REBELS BLOW CUP "Best Fight" Award (vs. Yusuke Ami)
- 2013 Shin Karate G-1 Grand Prix Light Middleweight Runner-up
- 2014 J-NETWORK All Japan Light Middleweight Tournament Winner
- 2014 K-1 Challenge A-Class -70 kg Tournament Runner-up
- 2017 K-1 Challenge A-Class -70 kg Tournament Winner and Tournament MVP

== Fight record ==
Professional Kickboxing Record
7 Wins (3 (T)KO's), 4 Loss, 0 Draw, 0 No Contest
| Date | Result | Opponent | Event | Location | Method | Round | Time |
| 2023-02-25 | Win | (Japan) Koki | Krush 146 | Tokyo, Japan | Decision (Unanimous) | 3 | 3:00 |
| 2022-04-03 | Loss | (Japan) Masaaki Noiri | K-1: K'Festa 5 | Tokyo, Japan | TKO (Corner stoppage) | 2 | 2:17 |
| 2021-04-23 | Loss | (Japan) Riki Matsuoka | Krush 124 | Tokyo, Japan | Decision (Unanimous) | 3 | 3:00 |
Lost the Krush Welterweight (-67.5 kg) title.
| 2021-01-23 | Win | (Japan) Kazuki Yamagiwa | Krush 121 | Tokyo, Japan | Decision (Unanimous) | 3 | 3:00 |
Won the Krush Welterweight (-67.5 kg) title.
| 2020-11-27 | Win | (Japan) Riki Matsuoka | Krush 119 | Tokyo, Japan | DQ (Illegal knee) | 2 | 2:42 |
| 2019-12-15 | Win | (Japan) Keita Makihira | K-1 KRUSH FIGHT 109 | Tokyo, Japan | TKO (Punches) | 2 | 2:48 |
| 2019-07-21 | Loss | (China) Chunyu Zhang | K-1 KRUSH FIGHT 103 | Tokyo, Japan | Decision (Unanimous) | 3 | 3:00 |
| 2019-01-26 | Win | (Japan) Kaito | Krush 97 | Tokyo, Japan | Decision (Unanimous) | 3 | 3:00 |
| 2018-07-22 | Win | (Japan) Kazuma Takekoshi | Krush 90 | Tokyo, Japan | TKO (Three knockdowns) | 1 | 1:29 |
| 2018-03-21 | Loss | (Japan) Ruku Kojima | K-1 World GP 2018: K'FESTA.1 | Tokyo, Japan | Decision (Majority) | 3 | 3:00 |
| 2017-12-09 | Win | (Japan) Kaito | Krush 83 | Tokyo, Japan | Decision (Unanimous) | 3 | 3:00 |
Legend: Win Loss Draw/No contest Notes

Amateur Kickboxing Record
| Date | Result | Opponent | Event | Location | Method | Round | Time |
|---|---|---|---|---|---|---|---|
| 2017-09-03 | Win | (Japan) Eiji Yoshida | K-1 Challenge A-Class Super Welterweight Tournament, Finals | Tokyo, Japan | Decision (Unanimous) | 3 | 2:00 |
Won the 2017 K-1 Challenge A-Class -70 kg Tournament title.
| 2017-09-03 | Win | (Japan) Akira Shirahama | K-1 Challenge A-Class Super Welterweight Tournament, Semifinals | Tokyo, Japan | Decision (Unanimous) | 3 | 2:00 |
| 2017-09-03 | Win | (Japan) Tatsuro Yoshida | K-1 Challenge A-Class Super Welterweight Tournament, Quarterfinals | Tokyo, Japan | Decision (Unanimous) | 3 | 2:00 |
| 2014-08-03 | Win | (Japan) Motohiro Ito | BLOW-CUP 30 | Tokyo, Japan | Decision (Unanimous) | 2 | 2:00 |
| 2014-07-21 | Loss | (Japan) Yasunaga Miyamoto | K-1 Challenge A-Class Super Welterweight Tournament, Finals | Tokyo, Japan | Decision (Split) | 3 | 2:00 |
For the 2014 K-1 Challenge A-Class -70 kg Tournament title.
| 2014-07-21 | Win | (Japan) Daichi Nonaka | K-1 Challenge A-Class Super Welterweight Tournament, Semifinals | Tokyo, Japan | Decision (Unanimous) | 3 | 2:00 |
| 2014-07-21 | Win | (Japan) Ryuhei Mishima | K-1 Challenge A-Class Super Welterweight Tournament, Quarterfinals | Tokyo, Japan | Decision (Unanimous) | 3 | 2:00 |
| 2014-02-09 | Win | (Japan) Yasunaga Miyamoto | J-NETWORK All Japan Light Middleweight Tournament, Finals | Tokyo, Japan | Ext. R. Decision (Split) | 2 | 3:00 |
Won the 2014 J-NETWORK All Japan Light Middleweight Tournament title.
| 2014-02-09 | Win | (Japan) Ryuhei Mishima | J-NETWORK All Japan Light Middleweight Tournament, Semifinals | Tokyo, Japan | Decision (Unanimous) | 1 | 3:00 |
| 2014-02-09 | Win | (Japan) Naoki Kobayashi | J-NETWORK All Japan Light Middleweight Tournament, Quarterfinals | Tokyo, Japan | Decision (Unanimous) | 1 | 3:00 |
| 2013-09-22 | Win | (Japan) Keima Saito | BLOW-CUP 20 | Tokyo, Japan | KO | 1 | 0:48 |
| 2013-03-03 | Loss | (Japan) Pan Ryunson | BLOW-CUP 14 | Tokyo, Japan | Decision (Unanimous) | 2 | 2:00 |
| 2013-03-03 | Win | (Japan) Yusuke Ami | BLOW-CUP 14 | Tokyo, Japan | Decision (Unanimous) | 2 | 2:00 |
| 2012-02-12 | Win | (Japan) Kazuhiro Suzuki | BLOW-CUP 2 | Tokyo, Japan | Decision (Unanimous) | 2 | 1:30 |
Legend: Win Loss Draw/No contest Notes

== See also ==
- List of male kickboxers
- List of Krush champions
