= Noriko Ikeuchi =

Japanese kickboxer (born 1999)

- Born: March 27, 1999 (age 27); Tsubata, Ishikawa, Japan
- Native name: 池内 紀子
- Height: 1.70 m (5 ft 7 in)
- Weight: 52 kg (115 lb; 8.2 st)
- Division: Flyweight
- Years active: 2021–present

Kickboxing record
- Total: 11
- Wins: 10
- By knockout: 1
- Losses: 1

Noriko Ikeuchi (Japanese: 池内 紀子; born March 27, 1999) is a Japanese kickboxer competing in the women's flyweight division of K-1. She is a former Krush Women's Flyweight Champion.

As of July 2025, she was ranked as the ninth-best women's flyweight kickboxer in the world by Beyond Kick.

== Early life ==
Noriko Ikeuchi was born in Tsubata, Ishikawa on March 27, 1999.

== Kickboxing career ==
Ikeuchi made her professional debut as a kickboxer and faced Satoko Ozawa at Krush 123 on March 27, 2021. She won by a 3-0 decision. In Krush, she also won by decision against Yoshimi in September of the same year and RAN in December.

Ikeuchi made her K-1 debut and faced ARINA at the K-1 WORLD GP 2022 JAPAN RING OF VENUS held on June 25, 2022. She won the bout by decision after overtime.

Ikeuchi faced Mao at Krush 150 on June 16, 2023, scoring her first knockdown of her career and winning by decision.

Ikeuchi participated in the 6th Krush Women's Flyweight Championship Tournament held at Krush 154 and Krush 157 in October 2023 and January 2024, winning by decision against Mayu in the semifinals and Mao in the finals. She won the tournament and became the champion in the same weight class. After winning, she injured her back and took a break for about three to four months.

Ikeuchi fought her first international professional fight against Choi Eun-ji, the women's bantamweight champion of the Korean striking martial arts organization MAX FC on November 16, 2024, at Krush 167. She won the bout by knockout in the second round. It was her first professional knockout victory.

Ikeuchi faced Vesela Rogaska on February 9, 2025, at K-1 WORLD MAX 2025. She won the bout by unanimous decision.

In her Krush Women's Flyweight title defense, Ikeuchi faced in Sofia Tsolakidou on August 23, 2025, in Tokyo, Japan. She lost the title by extension round unanimous decision.

== Championships and accomplishments ==
=== Kickboxing ===
- Krush
  - Krush Women's Flyweight (-52kg) Champion (One time)

== Kickboxing record ==
Professional Kickboxing Record
10 Wins (1 (T)KO's), 1 Losses, 0 Draw, 0 No Contest
Date	Result	Opponent	Event	Location	Method	Round	Time
2026-11-28		(France) Lyndsey Thomas	La Nuit des Champions 33	Marseille, France			
For La Nuit des Champions title.
2026-04-11	Win	(Japan) Melty Kira	K-1 Genki 2026	Tokyo, Japan	Decision (Unanimous)	3	3:00
2025-08-23	Loss	(Greece) Sofia Tsolakidou	Krush 179	Tokyo, Japan	Ext.R Decision (Unanimous)	4	3:00
Loses the Krush Women's Flyweight (-52kg) title.
2025-02-09	Win	(Greece) Vesela Rogaska	K-1 World MAX 2025	Tokyo, Japan	Decision (Unanimous)	3	3:00
2024-11-16	Win	(South Korea) Eun Ji Choi	Krush 167	Tokyo, Japan	KO (Right hook)	2	2:19
2024-01-28	Win	(Japan) Mao	Krush 157	Tokyo, Japan	Decision (Unanimous)	3	3:00
Wins the vacant Krush Women's Flyweight (-52kg) title.
2023-10-21	Win	(Japan) Mahiro	Krush 154	Tokyo, Japan	Decision (Unanimous)	3	3:00
2023-06-16	Win	(Japan) Mao	Krush 150	Tokyo, Japan	Decision (Majority)	3	3:00
2022-06-25	Win	(Japan) Arina	K-1: Ring of Venus	Tokyo, Japan	Decision (Unanimous)	3	3:00
2021-12-18	Win	(Japan) Ran	Krush 132	Tokyo, Japan	Decision (Unanimous)	3	3:00
2021-09-24	Win	(Japan) Yoshimi	Krush 129	Tokyo, Japan	Decision (Unanimous)	3	3:00
2021-03-27	Win	(Japan) Satoko Ozawa	Krush 123	Tokyo, Japan	Decision (Unanimous)	3	3:00
Legend: Win Loss Draw/No contest Notes

== See also ==
- List of female kickboxers
