= Kaisei Kondo =

Japanese kickboxer

- Born: July 2, 2001 (age 25); Osaka, Japan
- Height: 180 cm (5 ft 11 in)
- Weight: 67.5 kg (149 lb; 10.63 st)
- Style: Karate, Kickboxing
- Stance: Orthodox
- Fighting out of: Osaka, Japan
- Team: Taisei Kaikan; Kickboxing Gym 3K
- Trainer: Taisei Kondo
- Years active: 2018 - present

Kickboxing record
- Total: 15
- Wins: 10
- By knockout: 6
- Losses: 4
- By knockout: 4
- Draws: 1

Kaisei Kondo (近藤 魁成) is a Japanese kickboxer, fighting out of Osaka, Japan.

He was ranked the ninth-best super featherweight kickboxer in the world by Combat Press between March and September 2022.

== Biography ==
=== Early years ===
The son of a karate instructor, Kaisei is one of 8 siblings. From an early age he followed the path of his elder brothers, Kensei and Taisei, into karate and kickboxing training.
Around the age of 8, he developed Legg–Calvé–Perthes disease making him unable to walk for a time. During his recovery, he watched the 2011 inaugural Krush Championship Tournament, which inspired him to pursue his dream and become a professional kickboxer.

After his recovery, Kaisei started to actively participate in amateur competitions. By 2016, he had amassed multiple Kansai regional titles and awards.

In March 2017, Kaisei won the All Japan Shin Karate K-2 Grand Prix. This national title victory allowed him to participate in the K-1 Koshien tournament later that year. He competed against other under-18-year-old amateur kickboxers of Japan. Kaisei won the 65 kg K-1 Koshien tournament title on November 23, 2017 with a high kick knockout.

=== Professional career ===
Kaisei made his professional debut on March 21, 2018 at the K'festa 1 event. At just 16 years old, Kaisei scored a first-round KO victory against Shota Hara.

Kaisei's next fight on June 17, 2018 against the more experienced Hayato Suzuki ended in a draw after 3 rounds. Following a disappointing result, Kaisei went back to amateur competition and won the 2018 K-1 Koshien tournament for a second time, making him the first to win this accolade two years in a row. He then rematched his opponent from the 2017 K-1 Koshien final Ruku as a professional in K'festa 2. Kaisei won by second-round knockout.

His impressive performances prompted the matchmakers to sign him for a Krush Welterweight title fight two months later against the popular champion Minoru Kimura at Krush 101. Kaisei knocked down the champion with a high knee in round 1 before losing by TKO in the following round.

On August 24, 2019, Kondo scored a first round, K-1 knockout of the year contender when he took out Riki Matsuoka with a right overhand at K-1 World GP 2019: Japan vs World 5 vs 5 & Special Superfight in Osaka. Kaisei was then matched with top-10 ranked competitor Jordann Pikeur for the 67.5 kg title on November 24 at K-1 World GP 2019 Yokohamatsuri. Kondo lost the fight by TKO in round 2 due to repeated knockdowns from punches.

On August 29, 2020, Kaisei entered the 4-man Krush -67.5 kg Championship Tournament at Krush 116. Kaisei won in the semi-final by TKO from punches against Kaito. He faced Kazuki Yamagiwa in the final and forfeited at the end of round 1 when he broke his hand and wrist hitting the top of his opponent's head.

Kondo was scheduled to fight Maki Dwansonpong at K-1: K’Festa 4 on March 21, 2021. He won the bout by majority decision with scores of 29-29, 30-28 and 30-28.

Konda faced Alan Soares at Krush 133 on January 28, 2022. He won the fight by a first-round knockout, flooring Soares with a knee to body.

Kondo faced Hayato Suzuki at K-1 World GP 2022 in Fukuoka on August 11, 2022. He lost the fight by a fourth-round knockout.

== Titles and accomplishments ==
Amateur

- 2018 K-1 Koshien -65 kg Champion
- 2017 K-1 Koshien -65 kg Champion
- 2017 Shin Karate All Japan K-2 Grand Prix Champion
- 2016 K-1 All Japan A-Class Tournament -65 kg Champion
- 2016 WBC Muay Thai All Japan Jr. League (U15) -65 kg Champion
- 2016 K-1 All Japan Junior B-class -60 kg Champion
- 2015 KAKUMEI Jr. -52 kg Champion
- 2015 K-1 All Japan Junior B-class Tournament -60 kg Champion
- 2015 Shin Karate All Japan K-3 Grand Prix Champion
- 2014 Shin Karate All Japan K-4 Grand Prix Runner-up

== Fight record ==
Kickboxing record
10 Wins (5 (T)KO's), 7 Losses, 1 Draw, 0 No Contest
Date	Result	Opponent	Event	Location	Method	Round	Time
2026-02-01	Loss	(Japan) Shinichiro Kawasaki	Krush 186	Osaka, Japan	KO (Jab)	2	0:11
2025-05-18	Win	(Japan) Kensuke Ori	Krush 175	Osaka, Japan	Decision (Unanimous)	3	3:00
2024-11-23	Win	(Japan) Fukashi	Krush 168	Nagoya, Japan	Decision (Unanimous)	3	3:00
2024-01-28	Loss	(Japan) Takuma Tsukamoto	Krush 157	Tokyo, Japan	Decision (Unanimous)	3	3:00
2023-08-27	Loss	(Japan) FUMIYA	Krush 152	Tokyo, Japan	KO (Low kick)	1	2:11
2023-03-25	Win	(Brazil) Vitor Tofanelli	Krush 147	Tokyo, Japan	Decision (unanimous)	3	3:00
2022-08-11	Loss	(Japan) Hayato Suzuki	K-1 World GP 2022 in Fukuoka	Fukuoka, Japan	Ext.R KO (left cross)	4	1:09
2022-01-28	Win	(Brazil) Alan Soares	Krush 133	Tokyo, Japan	KO (knees to the body)	1	0:40
2021-03-21	Win	(Thailand) Duangsompong MakiGym	K-1: K'Festa 4 Day 1	Tokyo, Japan	Decision (majority)	3	3:00
2020-08-29	Loss	(Japan) Kazuki Yamagiwa	Krush.116, -67.5 kg Championship Tournament Final	Tokyo, Japan	TKO (retirement/wrist injury)	1	3:00
For the Krush Welterweight title.
2020-08-29	Win	(Japan) Kaito	Krush.116, -67.5 kg Championship Tournament Semi-final	Tokyo, Japan	KO (punches)	2	2:54
2020-03-28	Win	(Japan) Kazuki Yamagiwa	Krush.112	Tokyo, Japan	Decision (unanimous)	3	3:00
2019-11-24	Loss	(Netherlands) Jordann Pikeur	K-1 World GP 2019 Yokohamatsuri	Yokohama, Japan	TKO (3 Knockdowns/Punches)	2	2:40
2019-08-24	Win	(Japan) Riki Matsuoka	K-1 World GP 2019: Japan vs World 5 vs 5 & Special Superfight in Osaka	Osaka, Japan	KO (right cross)	1	2:18
2019-05-10	Loss	(Brazil) Minoru Kimura	Krush.101	Tokyo, Japan	KO (body punches)	2	1:43
For the Krush Welterweight title.
2019-03-10	Win	(Japan) Ruku	K-1 World GP 2019: K’FESTA 2	Saitama, Japan	KO (punches)	2	2:23
2018-06-17	Draw	(Japan) Hayato Suzuki	K-1 World GP 2018: 2nd Featherweight Championship Tournament	Saitama, Japan	Decision	3	3:00
2018-03-21	Win	(Japan) Shota Hara	K-1 World GP 2018: K'FESTA.1	Saitama, Japan	KO (punches)	1	1:23
Legend: Win Loss Draw/No contest Notes

Amateur Kickboxing Record
Date	Result	Opponent	Event	Location	Method	Round	Time
2018-09-24	Win	(Japan) Ryuka Oba	K-1 World GP 2018: inaugural Cruiserweight Championship Tournament	Saitama, Japan	Decision (Unanimous)	3	2:00
Wins 2018 K-1 Koshien -65kg title.
2018-07-29	Win	(Japan) Jail Tase	K-1 Koshien 2018 Tournament Semi-final	Tokyo, Japan	TKO (Punches)	1	1:05
2018-07-29	Win	(Japan) Kaito Hirokoshi	K-1 Koshien 2018 Tournament Quarter-final	Tokyo, Japan	KO (Right Cross)	1	0:15
2017-11-23	Win	(Japan) Ruku Kojima	K-1 World GP 2017, K-1 Koshien 2017 Tournament Final	Tokyo, Japan	KO (Left High Kick)	3	0:15
Wins 2017 K-1 Koshien -65kg title.
2017-07-29	Win	(Japan) Ryuki Noguchi	K-1 Koshien 2017 Tournament, Semi-final	Tokyo, Japan	KO (Punches)	1	
2016-12-11	Win	(Japan) Fumiya Kato	3rd K-1 All Japan Amateur Challenge, A-Class Tournament -65 kg Final	Tokyo, Japan	Decision (Unanimous)	1	2:00
Wins K-1 All Japan Amateur A-class -65kg title.
2016-12-11	Win	(Japan) Yuki Takeuchi	3rd K-1 All Japan Amateur Challenge, A-Class Tournament -65 kg Semi-final	Tokyo, Japan	KO	1	
2016-12-11	Win	(Japan) Kazuki Matsumoto	3rd K-1 All Japan Amateur Challenge, A-Class Tournament -65 kg Quarter-final	Tokyo, Japan	KO	1	
2016-11-20	Loss	(Japan) Naoki Inoue	J-Network All Japan A-League Tournament, Semi-final	Tokyo, Japan	Decision		
2016-11-20	Win	(Japan) Yuki Yasukawa	J-Network All Japan A-League Tournament, Quarter-final	Tokyo, Japan	KO		1:27
2016-11-20	Win	(Japan) Hiroki Suzuki	J-Network All Japan A-League Tournament, First Round	Tokyo, Japan	Decision (Unanimous)	2	2:00
2016-10-09	Win	(Japan) Katsumi Sano	NJKF West Japan Young Fight 2nd	Osaka, Japan	Decision (Unanimous)	2	1:30
Wins WBC Muay Thai Jr. (U15) -65kg title.
2016-08-20	Win	(Japan) Naruse Hayashi	K-1 Amateur in Nagoya	Nagoya, Japan	KO	1	
2016-07-03	Win	(Japan) Katsumi Sano	Next Level 31	Osaka, Japan	Decision (Unanimous)	2	1:30
2016-05-29	Loss	(Japan) Yuki Yamazaki	Next Level 30	Osaka, Japan	Decision (Unanimous)	2	2:00
2016-05-22	Win	(Japan) Yuga Furuta	K-1 All Japan Amateur Challenge 2016, B-Class Final	Tokyo, Japan	Decision (Unanimos)	2	2:00
Wins K-1 All Japan Amateur Junior B-class -60kg title.
2016-04-29	Win	(Japan) Ryuichi Kamojima	Next Level 29	Osaka, Japan	Decision	2	2:00
2016-02-14	Win	(Japan) Shiryu Tanaka	K-1 Amateur All Japan B-Class	Osaka, Japan	Decision	2	2:00
2015-12-27	Win	(Japan) Kouta Shintani	Next Level Kansai 26	Osaka, Japan	Decision	3	
2015-08-15	Win	(Japan) Yuma Saikyo	K-1 All Japan Amateur Challenge 2015, B-Class Tournament Final	Tokyo, Japan	Extra Round Decision	2	2:00
Wins K-1 All Japan Amateur Junior B-class -60kg title.
2015-08-15	Win	(Japan) Kuramoto	K-1 All Japan Amateur Challenge 2015, B-Class Tournament Semi-final	Tokyo, Japan	Forfeit		
2015-06-14	Win	(Japan) Koudai Niiya	NEXT LEVEL Kansai 23	Osaka, Japan	Decision	3	2:00
2015-04-26	Loss	(Japan) Yuma Saikyo	K-1 Amateur Challenge 2015, All Japan B-class Tournament Final	Japan	Decision	1	2:00
2014-09-21	Win	(Japan) Katsuya Aoki	TK BORDER -Season 6- The 3rd	Osaka, Japan	Decision (Unanimous)	3	2:00
Wins KAKUMEI Jr. -52kg title.
2014-06-22	Win	(Japan) Riku Hashimoto	Hoost Cup Spirit 4	Osaka, Japan	Decision		1:30
2014-06-15	Win	(Japan) Genta Matsubayashi	KAKUMEI KICKBOXING	Osaka, Japan	KO	2	0:26
2013-11-23	Win	(Japan) Itsuki Kobori	KAKUMEI KICKBOXING	Osaka, Japan	Decision (Unanimous)	3	1:30
2013-11-23	Win	(Japan) Katsuya Aoki	KAKUMEI KICKBOXING	Osaka, Japan	Decision (Split)	3	1:30
2013-06-16	Win	(Japan) Katsuya Aoki	KAKUMEI KICKBOXING	Osaka, Japan	Decision (Split)	3	1:30
2013-03-03	Loss	(Japan) Yoshiho Tane	KAKUMEI Kickboxing	Osaka, Japan	Decision (Unanimous)	3	1:30
Legend: Win Loss Draw/No contest Notes
