= Liu Mengyang =

Chinese kickboxer (born 2002)

- Born: 刘梦阳; December 23, 2002 (age 23); Fugou County, Zhoukou, China
- Nickname: "Spirit Dragon"; Shenlong (神龙)
- Height: 183 cm (6 ft 0 in)
- Weight: 70 kg (150 lb; 11 st)
- Style: Kickboxing
- Stance: Orthodox
- Fighting out of: Zhengzhou, China
- Team: Shunyuan Fighting Club (2019 - Present)
- Trainer: Zhang Dongbin

Kickboxing record
- Total: 42
- Wins: 35
- Losses: 7
- Draws: 0

Mixed martial arts record
- Total: 2
- Wins: 2
- By knockout: 1
- By submission: 1
- Losses: 0

Liu Mengyang (Chinese: 刘梦阳) is a Chinese kickboxer and mixed martial artist.

As of January 2026 he was the #10 ranked -71 kg kickboxer in the world according to Beyond Kickboxing.

== Kickboxing career ==
=== Early career ===
On December 31, 2022, Liu faced Xu Jiajie on Wu Lin Feng year-end event. He lost the fight by extension round decision.

On October 21, 2023, Liu faced Meng Lingkuo at TOP Fighting Championship. He won the fight by third-round technical knockout after a body kick.

On April 6, 2024, Liu travelled to Budapest, Hungary to face Dominik Bereczki as part of the Wu Lin Feng : Hungary vs China event. He lost the fight by unanimous decision.

On May 2 and 3, 2025, Liu took part in the two day 2025 Yu Ao Ti Yu Fighting Championship. On day one he defeated Masoud Minaei by technical knockout in the second round with calf kicks. On day two he stopped Narek Aboyan in the second round.

=== ONE Championship ===
Following a decision victory over Sudsakorn Sor Klinmee Liu was called for a short notice replacement to face Masaaki Noiri at ONE Friday Fights 92 on December 20, 2024. He won the fight via unanimous decision after scoring a knockdown 20 seconds into the bout.

Liu faced Mohammad Siasarani at ONE Friday Fights 105 on April 18, 2025. He lost the fight by split decision.

Liu was scheduled to face Tawanchai P.K. Saenchaimuaythaigym at ONE Friday Fights 126 on September 26, 2025. Tawanchai was later replaced by Shadow Singha Mawynn. Liu won the fight by unanimous decision after scoring a knockdown.

On December 19, 2025, Liu faced Tawanchai P.K. Saenchaimuaythaigym at ONE Friday Fights 137. He won the fight by first-round technical knockout in 52 seconds after breaking Tawanchai's leg with a low kick.

== Mixed martial arts career ==
Liu made his professional mixed martial arts debut on June 29, 2024, against Weihao Cai at JCK Fight Night 87. He won the fight by technical knockout in the first round.

== Titles and accomplishments ==
- Yu Ao Ti Yu
  - 2024 Yu Ao Ti Yu Fighting Championship -75 kg Champion

Awards

- 2024 Beyond Kickboxng "Upset of the Year" (vs. Masaaki Noiri)

== Kickboxing record ==
Professional Kickboxing Record
36 Wins (11 (T)KOs), 8 Losses, 0 Draw
Date	Result	Opponent	Event	Location	Method	Round	Time
2026-08-08	Loss	(Japan) Masaaki Noiri	ONE Samurai 2	Tokyo, Japan	KO (Punches)	1	2;59
ONE Samurai Featherweight Kickboxing Tournament Quarterfinal.
2026-05-22	Win	(Venezuela) Gabriel Pereira	ONE Friday Fights 155, Lumpinee Stadium	Bangkok, Thailand	Decision (Unanimous)	3	3:00
2025-12-19	Win	(Thailand) Tawanchai P.K. Saenchaimuaythaigym	ONE Friday Fights 137, Lumpinee Stadium	Bangkok, Thailand	TKO (Broken Leg/Low kick)	1	0:52
2025-09-26	Win	(Thailand) Shadow Singha Mawynn	ONE Friday Fights 126, Lumpinee Stadium	Bangkok, Thailand	Decision (Unanimous)	3	3:00
2025-04-18	Loss	(Iran) Mohammad Siasarani	ONE Friday Fights 105, Lumpinee Stadium	Bangkok, Thailand	Decision (Split)	3	3:00
2024-12-20	Win	(Japan) Masaaki Noiri	ONE Friday Fights 92, Lumpinee Stadium	Bangkok, Thailand	Decision (Unanimous)	3	3:00
2024-10-25	Win	(Thailand) Sudsakorn Sor Klinmee	Zhong Long Fight	China	Decision (Unanimous)	3	3:00
2024-10-03	Win	(Iran) Abolfazl Alipourandi	Wu Lin Da Hui	China	TKO (Left hook)	1	2:18
2024-05-03	Win	(Armenia) Narek Aboyan	Yu Ao Ti Yu Fighting Championship - Day 2	Leshan, China	TKO (Right cross)	2	1:40
Wins the 2024 Yu Ao Ti Yu Championship -75kg title.
2024-05-02	Win	(Iran) Masoud Minaei	Yu Ao Ti Yu Fighting Championship - Day 1	Leshan, China	TKO (calf kicks)	2	2:45
2024-04-06	Loss	(Hungary) Dominik Bereczki	Wu Lin Feng 2024: Hungary vs China	Budapest, Hungary	Decision	3	3:00
2023-10-21	Win	(China) Meng Lingkuo	TOP Fighting Championship	Hefei, China	KO (body kick)	3	
2023-09-11	Win	(China) Xiong Junhao	TOP Fighting Championship	China	TKO (Body kicks)	3	2:04
2023-06-30	Win	(Thailand) Seksan	Zhenhua Hero World Kung Fu King Championship	Hefei, China	Decision	3	3:00
2023-05-27	Win	(China) Tan Xiaofeng	Wu Lin Feng 538	Tangshan, China	Decision	3	3:00
2023-05-01	Win	(China) Wang Qi	Kunlun Fight	China	Decision (Unanimous)	3	3:00
2022-12-31	Loss	(China) Xu Jiajie	Wu Lin Feng	Foshan, China	Ext.R Decision	4	3:00
2021-12-31	Loss	(China) Xu Jiajie	Kunlun Fight	China	Decision (Unanimous)	3	3:00
Legend: Win Loss Draw/No contest Notes

== Mixed martial arts record ==
Professional record breakdown
2 matches	2 wins	0 losses
By knockout	1	0
By submission	1	0
By decision	0	0

Res.	Record	Opponent	Method	Event	Date	Round	Time	Location	Notes
Win	2-0	Maimaitikari Apaer	Submission (ninja choke)	JCK Fight Night 94	2 November 2024	1	3:00	Lüliang, China	Lightweight debut.
Win	1–0	Weihao Cai	TKO (punches)	JCK Fight Night 87	29 June 2024	1	4:17	Lüliang, China	Welterweight debut.

== See also ==
- List of male kickboxers
