= List of Krush champions =

This is a list of all Krush champions. Included are all champions who have won the title since the brands inauguration in 2009, as a collaboration of K-1 and AJKF. It is the sister brand of K-1.

== Krush Cruiserweight Championship ==
Weight limit: 90 kg (198.4 lb)

Name	Date	Defenses
(Japan) K-Jee (def. Rui Hanazawa)	August 31, 2019	def. Hisaki Kato on March 28, 2020
K-Jee vacated the title on December 22, 2020, to focus of his K-1 title.
(Iran) Mahmoud Sattari (def. Seiya Tanigawa)	July 24, 2021	def. Animal Koji on December 18, 2021
Sattari vacated the title on April 16, 2025.
(Japan) Seiya Tanigawa (def. Shota Yamaguchi)	May 25, 2025	
Tanigawa vacated the title on January 23, 2026.

== Krush Middleweight Championship ==
Weight limit: 75 kg (165.3 lb)

Name	Date	Defenses
(Japan) Aqil Bukhari (def. Katsuya Jinbo)	June 23, 2024	
(Brazil) Dengue Silva (def. Aqil Bukhari)	July 26, 2025	
Silva vacated the title on July 4, 2026, in order to focus on his K-1 championship.

== Krush Super Welterweight Championship ==
Weight limit: 70 kg (154.3 lb)

Name	Date	Defenses
(Japan) Kenta Yamada (def. Yutaro Yamauchi)	July 16, 2011	
(Japan) Yasuhiro Kido (def. Kenta Yamada)	March 17, 2012	def. Takurō Moriya on January 28, 2013; def. Yutaro Yamauchi on August 11, 2013; def. Hiroki Nakajima on April 15, 2014
Kido vacated the title on August 21, 2014.
(Japan) Hiroki Nakajima (def. Yoichi Yamazaki)	April 12, 2015	def. Yutaro Yamauchi on October 4, 2015
(Netherlands) Jordann Pikeur (def. Hiroki Nakajima)	April 10, 2016	def. Yoichi Yamazaki on July 18, 2016; def. Yu Hirono on January 15, 2017; def. Yutaro Yamauchi on January 27, 2018; def. Hiromi Wajima on September 30, 2018; def. Katsuya Jinbo on June 31, 2019
Pikeur vacated the title on May 11, 2023.
(Japan) Jinku Oda (def. Riku)	August 18, 2024	
(Nepal) Abiral Ghimire (def. Jinku Oda)	May 18, 2025	def. Riku on March 28, 2026
Ghimire vacated the title on July 4, 2026.

== Krush Welterweight Championship ==
Weight limit: 67.5 kg (148.8 lb)

Name	Date	Defenses
(Japan) Yuta Kubo (def. Abdellah Ezbiri)	January 14, 2013	
(Japan) Masaaki Noiri (def. Yuta Kubo)	September 1, 2013	
Noiri vacated the title on February 26, 2014 after moving to super lightweight.
(Japan) Keita Makihira (def. Yuya Yamamoto)	April 15, 2014	draw. Daiki Watabe on March 15, 2014; def. Abdellah Ezbiri on October 5, 2014
(Japan) Daiki Watabe (def. Keita Makihira )	January 17, 2016	
(Japan) Hitoshi Tsukakoshi (def. Daiki Watabe)	October 15, 2016	def. Mohan Maharjan on February 18, 2017; def. Keita Makihira on February 12, 2018
(Brazil) Minoru Kimura (def. Hitoshi Tsukakoshi)	August 5, 2018	def. Kaisei Kondo on May 18, 2019
Kimura vacated the title on July 11, 2020 to focus on his K-1 title.
(Japan) Kazuki Yamagiwa (def. Kaisei Kondo)	August 29, 2020	
(Japan) Kona Kato (def. Kazuki Yamagiwa)	January 23, 2021	
(Japan) Riki Matsuoka (def. Kona Kato)	April 23, 2021	
(Japan) Ayinta Ali (def. Riki Matsuoka)	February 20, 2022	def. Kota Nakano on August 27, 2022
Ali vacated the title on February 20, 2025, after announcing a transition to MMA.
(Japan) Koya Saito (def. Masaki Oishi)	December 19, 2025	

== Krush Super Lightweight Championship ==
Weight limit: 65 kg (143.3 lb)

Name	Date	Defenses
(Japan) HIROYA (def. TaCa)	March 8, 2014	
(Japan) Naoki Terasaki (def. HIROYA)	July 13, 2014	
(Japan) NOMAN (def. Naoki Terasaki)	January 4, 2015	
(Japan) Hideaki Yamazaki (def. NOMAN)	November 14, 2015	
Yamazaki vacated the title on October 11, 2016 after sustaining ligament injuries.
(Japan) Jun Nakazawa (def. Yukihiro Komiya)	April 2, 2017	def. Yasuomi Soda on August 6, 2017
(Japan) Yuto Shinohara (def. Jun Nakazawa)	August 5, 2018	
Shinohara vacated the title on December 18, 2018 after moving to lightweight.
(Japan) Hayato Suzuki (def. Daiki Matsushita)	January 26, 2019	def. Yasuomi Soda on August 31, 2019
(Japan) Daizo Sasaki (def. Hayato Suzuki)	February 24, 2020	def. Kensei Kondo on July 11, 2020; def. Jin Hirayama on May 30, 2021; def. Hikaru Terashima on June 17, 2022
Sasaki vacated the title on December 16, 2022.
(Japan) Shu Inagaki (def. Takuma Tsukamoto)	April 28, 2023	def. Ruku Kojima on November 25, 2023; def. Takuma Tsukamoto on May 5, 2026

== Krush Lightweight Championship ==
Weight limit: 62.5 kg (137.8 lb)

Name	Date	Defenses
(Japan) Ryuji Kajiwara (def. Koya Urabe)	April 30, 2011	def. Tetsuya Yamato on December 9, 2011
(France) Thomas Adamandopoulos (def. Ryuji Kajiwara)	August 12, 2012	
(Japan) Hideaki Yamazaki (def. Thomas Adamandopoulos)	March 20, 2013	def. Minoru Kimura on December 14, 2013; def. Mohamed Boulef on June 12, 2014; def. Joan Cañaveral on June 12, 2015
Yamazaki vacated the title on September 13, 2015 after moving to super lightweight.
(Japan) Daizo Sasaki (def. Ren Hiramoto)	June 12, 2016	def. Hiroto Iwasaki on October 15, 2016; def. Toshiki Taniyama on August 6, 2017
(Thailand) Kongnapa Weerasakreck (def. Daizo Sasaki)	April 22, 2018	def. Fumiya Osawa on September 30, 2018; def. Takumi Yokoyama on January 25, 2020; def. Yuto Shinohara on June 28, 2020
Gonnapar vacated the title on March 1, 2021, to focus on his K-1 title.
(Japan) Shuji Kawarada (def. Yuzuki Satomi)	September 24, 2021	
(Japan) Fumiya Osawa (def. Shuji Kawarada)	April 30, 2022	
(Japan) Yuzuki Satomi (def. Fumiya Osawa)	June 16, 2023	
(Japan) Kento Ito (def. Yuzuki Satomi)	February 24, 2023	
(Japan) Tatsuya Oiwa (def. Kento Ito)	July 27, 2024	def. Yuto Shinohara on November 29, 2025
(Japan) Kenshin Kodama (def. Tatsuya Oiwa)	October 31, 2026	

== Krush Super Featherweight Championship ==
Weight limit: 60 kg (132.3 lb)

Name	Date	Defenses
(Japan) Hirotaka Urabe (def. Yuji Takeuchi)	April 30, 2011	draw. Naoki Ishikawa on January 9, 2012; def. Fumiya Osawa on July 21, 2012; draw. Naoki Ishikawa on December 14, 2012
(Japan) Kan Itabashi (def. Hirotaka Urabe)	August 11, 2013	
(Japan) Haruaki Otsuki (def. Kan Itabashi)	August 11, 2013	
Otsuki vacated the title on October 17, 2014 due to injuries.
(Japan) Hirotaka Urabe (def. Kotaro Shimano)	November 9, 2014	def. German Tabuenca on May 4, 2015; def. Zhuang Shuson on September 12, 2015
Urabe vacated the title on June 1, 2016 to focus on his K-1 title.
(Japan) Riku Anpo (def. Leona Pettas)	May 28, 2017	
(Japan) Masanobu Goshu (def. Riku Anpo)	October 1, 2017	
(Japan) Kotaro Shimano (def. Masanobu Goshu)	June 30, 2018	def. Tatsuya Oiwa on December 16, 2018
(Japan) Yuma Saikyo (def. Kotaro Shimano)	March 9, 2019	
(Japan) Leona Pettas (def. Yuma Saikyo)	September 16, 2019	def. Naoki Yamamoto on December 15, 2019; def. Tatsuya Oiwa on June 28, 2020
Pettas vacated the title on September 3, 2021.
(Japan) Chihiro Nakajima (def. Tomoya Yokoyama)	January 28, 2022	def. Narufumi Nishimoto on December 18, 2022
(Japan) Naoki Takahashi (def. Chihiro Nakajima)	September 29, 2023	
(Japan) Tomoya Yokoyama (def. Naoki Takahashi)	February 24, 2024	def. Yuta Matsuyama on December 8, 2024
Tomoyama vacated the title on August 3, 2026, in order to focus on his K-1 title.
(Japan) Kanata Ueno (def. Narufumi Nishimoto)	Aug 30, 2026	

== Krush Featherweight Championship ==
Weight limit: 57.5 kg (126.8 lb)

Name	Date	Defenses
(Japan) Takeru Segawa (def. Nobuchika Terado)	May 12, 2013	def. Shota Kanbe on March 8, 2014; def. Yuzo Suzuki on August 9, 2014; def. Yuta Otaki on February 6, 2015
Segawa vacated the title on August 5, 2015 to defend the K-1 title.
(Japan) Kaito Ozawa (def. Shota Kanbe)	February 5, 2016	def. Tatsuya Oiwa on August 20, 2016; def. Yun Qi on March 3, 2017
(Japan) Haruma Saikyo (def. Kaito Ozawa)	October 1, 2017	def. Yuta Murakoshi on March 10, 2018
(Japan) Yuki Egawa (def. Haruma Saikyo)	March 10, 2019	def. TETSU on June 21, 2018
Egawa vacated the title on February 3, 2020, to focus on his K-1 title.
(Japan) Takahito Niimi (def. Riku Morisaka)	November 27, 2020	def. Toma on February 27, 2021; def. Keito Okajima on June 25, 2021; def. Tatsuki Shinotsuka on December 18, 2021
(Japan) Shuhei Kumura (def. Takahito Niimi)	May 21, 2022	
(Japan) Riku Morisaka (def. Shuhei Kumura)	March 25, 2023	
(Japan) Tatsuki Shinotsuka (def. Riku Morisaka)	Oct 21, 2023	
Shinotsuka vacated the title on March 27, 2024, after buying out his contract.
(Japan) Ryota Ishida (def. Raita Hashimoto)	Sep 28, 2024	def. Haruto Matsumoto on May 18, 2025
Ishida vacated the title on July 4, 2026, in order to focus on his K-1 championship.

== Krush Super Bantamweight Championship ==
Weight limit: 55 kg (121.3 lb)

Name	Date	Defenses
(Japan) Shota Takiya (def. Ryuya Kusakabe)	April 30, 2011	def. Nobuchika Terado on January 9, 2012; def. Takumi Tosaka on August 26, 2012
Takiya vacated the title on May 25, 2013 after moving to a non-K1 affiliated gym.
(Japan) Shota Takiya (def. Takumi Tosaka)	January 4, 2014	def. Ryuma Tobe on May 11, 2014
(Japan) Taiga Kawabe (def. Shota Takiya)	August 24, 2014	
Kawabe vacated the title on April 24, 2015 following a knee injury.
(Japan) Ryuji Horio (def. Takumi Tosaka)	August 14, 2015	
(Japan) Nobuchika Terado (def. Ryuji Horio)	March 20, 2016	def. Charles Bongiovanni on September 30, 2016; def. Kenji Kubo on November 5, 2017
Title is declared vacant on July 1, 2018, due to Terado's inactivity.
(Japan) Masashi Kumura (def. Taito Gunji)	February 16, 2019	def. Yuta Hayashi on November 16, 2019; def. Taito Gunji on September 26, 2020
Kumura vacated the title on July 9, 2021.
(Japan) Riamu (def. Momotaro Kiyama)	October 31, 2021	def. Lyra Nagasaka on July 22, 2023; def. Eiki Kurata on March 30, 2024; def. Koji Ikeda on March 30, 2025; def. Kengo Murata on November 29, 2025

== Krush Bantamweight Championship ==
Weight limit: 53 kg (116.8 lb)

Name	Date	Defenses
(Japan) Yoshiki Takei (def. Yuki Ueba)	June 12, 2016	def. Ryusei on December 18, 2016
Takei vacated the title on May 22, 2017 to focus on his K-1 title.
(Japan) Taito Gunji (def. Ryusei)	September 8, 2017	
(Japan) Akihiro Kaneko (def. Taito Gunji)	June 30, 2018	def. Junya Weerasakreck on October 28, 2018
Kaneko vacated the title on December 18, 2018, after moving up to super-bantamweight.
(Japan) Koki (def. Junya Weerasakreck)	April 19, 2019	
(Japan) Junki Sasaki (def. Koki)	November 8, 2019	
Sasaki vacated the title on July 22, 2020, after moving up to super-bantamweight.
(Japan) Begin Yoshioka (def. Mao Hashimoto)	December 19, 2020	
(Japan) Kazuki Miburo (def. Begin Yoshioka)	March 27, 2021	
(Japan) Koji Ikeda (def. Kazuki Miburo)	March 26, 2022	def. Aoi Noda on July 30, 2022; def. Kiri Matsutani on February 25, 2023
Ikeda vacated the title on April 26, 2024 in order to move up in weight.
(Japan) Eito Kurokawa (def. Yusei Shirahata)	October 25, 2024	def. Daina on March 30, 2025
Kurokawa vacated the title on November 14, 2025 to focus on the bout for the vacant K-1 Bantamweight title.
(Japan) Ryu Ohira (def. Kakeru Nagano)	October 31, 2026	

== Krush Flyweight Championship ==
Weight limit: 51 kg (112.4 lb)

Name	Date	Defenses
(Japan) Rui Okubo (def. Daina)	September 24, 2022	
Okubo vacated the title on April 14, 2023, in order to move up in weight.
(Japan) Toki Oshika (def. Daina)	May 20, 2023	
(Japan) Yuto (def. Toki Oshika)	Oct 21, 2023	
(Japan) Daina (def. Yuto)	Jan 28, 2024	
Daina vacated the title on March 30, 2025 in order to move up in weight.
(Japan) Neigo Katono (def. Ryuki Yasuo)	December 19, 2025	
Katono vacated the title on November 5, 2026 in order to focus on his K-1 bantamweight title.		

== Krush Women's Flyweight Championship ==
Weight limit: 52 kg (114.6 lb)

Name	Date	Defenses
(Japan) Syuri (def. Miku Hayashi)	March 16, 2014	def. Kanako Taniyama on July 13, 2014; def. Aki Gracyer on December 21, 2014; def. Tomoko SP on September 12, 2015
Syuri vacated the title on February 4, 2016, after singing with Pancrase.
(Japan) Kana Morimoto (def. Momi)	April 10, 2016	def. Aki Gracyer on July 18, 2016; def. Kai Ting Chuang on September 30, 2016
(Netherlands) Mellony Geugjes (def. Kana Morimoto)	January 15, 2017	def. Momi on March 15, 2017
(Japan) Kana Morimoto (def. Mellony Geugjes)	December 9, 2017	def. Kim Townsend on May 17, 2018; def. Liu Shibei on August 18, 2018
Morimoto vacated the title on June 17, 2020 to focus on her K-1 title
(Japan) Kotomi (def. Mahiro)	April 23, 2021	
Kotomi vacated the title on August 1, 2023, due to recurring brain issues
(Japan) Noriko Ikeuchi (def. MAO)	Jan 28, 2024	
(Greece) Sofia Tsolakidou (def. Noriko Ikeuchi)	August 23, 2025	

== Krush Women's Atomweight Championship ==
Weight limit: 45 kg (99.2 lb)

Name	Date	Defenses
(Japan) Emi Matsushita (def. Eguchi Comachi)	December 9, 2017	def. Yoshimi on June 30, 2018
Title is declared vacant on October 25, 2018, after Matsushita refused to fight Takanashi Miho.
(Japan) Miho Takanashi (def. Shizuka)	May 18, 2019	def. Phayahong Ayothayafightgym on October 13, 2019
Miho vacated the title on June 6, 2020, after moving up to minimumweight.
(Japan) Miyuu Sugawara (def. Moe Takahashi)	November 27, 2020	def. MIO on November 20, 2021; def. Yu on February 20, 2022; def. Chan Lee on October 28, 2022
Sugawara vacated the title on September 26, 2023.
(Japan) Kira Matsutani (def. Nana Okuwaki)	November 25, 2023	
Matsutani vacated the title on January 23, 2026 in order to focus on her K-1 title.

== Tournament winners ==
=== Grand Prix champions ===
Krush Lightweight Grand Prix 2009
Date	Champion	Nationality	Event	Location	Runner-up	Nationality
2009-11-02	Masahiro Yamamoto	Japan	Krush Lightweight Grand Prix 2009 〜Round.2〜	Tokyo, Japan	Yuta Kubo	Japan

Krush Grand Prix 2013 ~67 kg Tournament~
Date	Champion	Nationality	Event	Location	Runner-up	Nationality
2013-01-14	Yuta Kubo	Japan	Krush Grand Prix 2013 ~67 kg Tournament~	Tokyo, Japan	Abdellah Ezbiri	France

Krush Lightweight Grand Prix 2025
Date	Champion	Nationality	Event	Location	Runner-up	Nationality
2025-02-24	Yuma Saikyo	Japan	Krush 171	Tokyo, Japan	Haru Furumiya	Japan

=== Youth Grand Prix champions ===
Krush 2011 Under-22 ~63kg Supernova~ Tournament
Date	Champion	Nationality	Event	Location	Runner-up	Nationality
2009-03-14	Takuya Shirahama	Japan	Krush.2	Tokyo, Japan	Yosuke Morii	Japan

Krush 2011 Under-22 ~63kg Supernova~ Tournament
Date	Champion	Nationality	Event	Location	Runner-up	Nationality
2011-12-09	Masaaki Noiri	Japan	Krush.14	Tokyo, Japan	Koya Urabe	Japan

Krush 2012 Under-22 ~63kg Supernova~ Tournament
Date	Champion	Nationality	Event	Location	Runner-up	Nationality
2012-11-10	Koya Urabe	Japan	Krush.24	Tokyo, Japan	Hisaki Higashimoto	Japan

Krush 2012 Under-22 ~70kg Supernova~ Tournament
Date	Champion	Nationality	Event	Location	Runner-up	Nationality
2012-11-10	Shintaro Matsukura	Japan	Krush.24	Tokyo, Japan	Taisei Kondo	Japan

Krush YOUTH GP 2013 -55kg Tournament
Date	Champion	Nationality	Event	Location	Runner-up	Nationality
2013-12-14	Taiga	Japan	Krush.35	Tokyo, Japan	Ryuji Horio	Japan

=== Wildrush League champions ===
GAORA Krush 2012 -63kg WILDRUSH League
Date	Champion	Nationality	Event	Location	Runner-up	Nationality
2012-10-08	Hideaki Yamazaki	Japan	Krush.23	Tokyo, Japan	Hitoshi Tsukakoshi	Japan

Krush -60kg WILDRUSH League 2014
Date	Champion	Nationality	Event	Location	Runner-up	Nationality
2014-10-05	Kotaro Shimano	Japan	Krush.46	Tokyo, Japan	Tomohiro Kitai	Japan

Krush -58kg WILDRUSH League 2015
Date	Champion	Nationality	Event	Location	Runner-up	Nationality
2015-12-04	Kaito Ozawa	Japan	Krush.61	Tokyo, Japan	Kento Ito	Japan

== Records ==
=== Most wins in title bouts ===
Title wins	Champion	Weight class	W	D	NC	L
7	(Japan) Daizo Sasaki	Lightweight, Super Lightweight	7	0	0	1
6	(Netherlands) Jordann Pikeur	Super Welterweight	6	0	0	0
6	(Japan) Kana Morimoto	Women's Flyweight	6	0	0	1
5	(Japan) Hirotaka Urabe	Super Featherweight	5	2	0	1
5	(Japan) Shota Takiya	Super Bantamweight	5	0	0	1

=== Most consecutive title defenses ===
Defenses	Champion	Division	Period
5	(Netherlands) Jordann Pikeur	Super Welterweight	April 10, 2016 - current
4	(Japan) Riamu	Super Bantamweight	October 31, 2021 - November 29, 2025
3	(Japan) Hirotaka Urabe	Super Featherweight	April 30, 2011 - August 11, 2013
3	(Japan) Yasuhiro Kido	Super Welterweight	March 17, 2012 - August 21, 2014
3	(Japan) Hideaki Yamazaki	Lightweight	March 20, 2013 - September 13, 2015
3	(Japan) Takeru Segawa	Featherweight	May 12, 2013 - August 5, 2015
3	(Japan) Syuri	Women's Flyweight	March 16, 2014 - February 4, 2016
3	(Thailand) Gonnapar Weerasakreck	Lightweight	April 22, 2018 - March 1, 2021
3	(Japan) Takahito Niimi	Featherweight	November 27, 2020 - May 21, 2022
3	(Japan) Daizo Sasaki	Super Lightweight	February 24, 2020 - June 17, 2022

== See also ==
- List of K-1 champions
- List of male kickboxers
