= Phetasawin Seatranferry =

Thai Muay Thai kickboxer

Phetasawin
- Born: Watcharin Aungsuthi; May 7, 1987 (age 39); Nakhon Si Thammarat, Thailand
- Other names: Petchasawin Seatransferry, Petasawin
- Height: 171 cm (5 ft 7 1/2 in)
- Weight: 67 kg (148 lb; 11 st)
- Style: Muay Thai
- Stance: Orthodox
- Fighting out of: Bangkok, Thailand
- Team: Saengmorakot Gym

Phetasawin Seatranferry (Thai: เพชรอัศวิน ซีทรานเฟอร์รี่) is a Thai Muay Thai fighter.

== Biography and career ==
Phetasawin started competing in Muay Thai at the age of 8 trained by his father. He was at the Sor Likorn camp in his native province of Nakhon Si Thammarat as a child and later joined the Saengmorakot gym in Bangkok at the age of 12. Competing from there he captured two Thailand titles at 135 and 147 lbs in 2008 and 2011.

On February 19, 2011, Phetasawin travelled to Glasgow, Scotland to face UK number 1 Liam Harrison at Super Showdown II. He won the fight by decision.

Phetasawin took part in the 2011-2012 Isuzu Cup at the Omnoi Stadium. He won three fights to qualify for the final 4 of the tournament. In the semifinal happening on January 21, 2012, Phetasawin was knocked out by Singmanee Kaewsamrit in the third round.

Phetasawin defeated Charles François by split decision at Best of Siam 3 in Paris, France, on February 14, 2013.

Phetasawin participated in the first MAX Muay Thai 4-man tournament on May 5, 2013. In the semifinal he defeated Jos Mendoca by technical knockout in the first round before losing by second round high kick knockout to Andrei Kulebin in the final.

Phetasawin defeated Bobo Sacko for a second time on June 20, 2013, at Best of Siam 4. He won the fight by split decision.

On September 22, 2013, Phetasawin travelled to Prague where he defeated local Jan Moncol by decision.

On November 15, 2013, Phetasawin faced at the Lumpinee Stadium for the Eminent Air promotion. He lost the fight by knockout in the fourth round from punches.

== Titles and accomplishments ==
- Professional Boxing Association of Thailand (PAT)
  - 2008 Thailand Lightweight (135 lbs) Champion
  - 2011 Thailand Welterweight (147 lbs) Champion
- World Council of Kickboxing
  - 2010 WCK Muay Thai International Champion

== Muay Thai record ==
Muay Thai record
65 Wins (18 (T)KOs, 30 Losses, 2 Draws)
Date	Result	Opponent	Event	Location	Method	Round	Time
2014-01-11	Loss	(Thailand) Detrit Sathian Gym	Omnoi Stadium	Bangkok, Thailand	Decision	5	3:00
2013-11-15	Loss	(Thailand) Diesellek Aoodonmuang	Eminent Air, Lumpinee Stadium	Bangkok, Thailand	KO (Punches)	4	
2013-10-15	Win	(Thailand) Nopakrit Kor.Kampanat	Saengmorakot, Lumpinee Stadium	Bangkok, Thailand	Decision	5	3:00
2013-09-22	Win	(Czech Republic) Jan Moncol		Prague, Czech Republic	Decision	5	2:00
2013-07-19	Win	(Thailand) Chok EminentAir	Cheweng Boxing Stadium	Ko Samui, Thailand	Decision	5	3:00
2013-06-20	Win	(France) Bobo Sacko	Best Of Siam 4	Paris, France	Decision (split)	3	3:00
2013-05-06	Loss	(Belarus) Andrei Kulebin	MAX Muay Thai 1, Final	Surin, Thailand	KO (High kick)	2	1:15
For the MAX Muay Thai Tournament title.
2013-05-06	Win	(Brazil) Jos Mendoca	MAX Muay Thai 1, Semifinal	Surin, Thailand	TKO	1	
2013-02-14	Win	(France) Charles François	Best of Siam 3	Paris, France	Decision (split)	5	3:00
2013-01-25	Loss	(Thailand) Sitthichai Sitsongpeenong	Friday Night, Cheweng Boxing Stadium	Ko Samui, Thailand	KO	2	
2012-11-22	Win	(France) Bobo Sacko	Best Of Siam 2	Paris, France	TKO (Corner stoppage)	4	
2012-09-22	Win	(Cambodia) Pich Seiha	Bali Muaythai Grand Match 2012	Bali, Indonesia	Decision	5	3:00
2012-06-03	Loss	(Belarus) Andrei Kulebin	WKN Kings of Muay Thai	Belarus	KO (Elbow)	3	
2012-04-24	Loss	(Thailand) Sitthichai Sitsongpeenong	Wanwirapon, Lumpinee Stadium	Bangkok, Thailand	Decision	5	3:00
2012-03-24	Win	(Thailand) Ikuysang Kor.Rungthannakiat	Omnoi Stadium - Isuzu Cup 3rd place fight	Samut Sakhon, Thailand	Decision	5	3:00
2012-01-21	Loss	(Thailand) Singmanee Kaewsamrit	Omnoi Stadium - Isuzu Cup, Semifinal	Samut Sakhon, Thailand	KO (Right Hook)	3	
2011-12-03	Win	(Thailand) Saksurin Kiatyongyut	Omnoi Stadium - Isuzu Cup	Samut Sakhon, Thailand	Decision	5	3:00
2011-10-22	Loss	(Thailand) Superbon Lookjaomaesaivare	Omnoi Stadium - Isuzu Cup	Samut Sakhon, Thailand	Decision	5	3:00
2011-09-17	Win	(Thailand) Saenchainoi Phumphanmuang	Omnoi Stadium - Isuzu Cup	Samut Sakhon, Thailand	Decision	5	3:00
Wins the vacant Thailand Welterweight (147 lbs) title.
2011-07-02	Win	(Thailand) Chok EminentAir	Omnoi Stadium - Isuzu Cup	Samut Sakhon, Thailand	Decision	5	3:00
2011-06-04	Win	(Thailand) Bagjo D.C.P. Gym	Omnoi Stadium	Samut Sakhon, Thailand	KO (Right cross)	3	
2011-05-14	Win	(France) Sofiane Derdega	THAI FIGHT Extreme	Cannes, France	Decision	3	3:00
2011-02-19	Win	(England) Liam Harrison	Super Showdown II	Glasgow, Scotland	Decision	5	3:00
2010-12-18	Win	(Brazil) Leonardo Monteiro	WCK Muay Thai Day 1	Hainan, China	TKO	4	
Wins the WCK International title.
2010-09-25	Loss	(Thailand) Petchtanong Petchfergus	Omnoi Stadium	Samut Sakhon, Thailand	KO (High kick)	5	
2010-01-30	Loss	(Thailand) Puja Sor.Suwanee	Omnoi Stadium	Samut Sakhon, Thailand	TKO	4	
2009-12-12	Loss	(Thailand) Saenchainoi ToyotaRayong	Omnoi Stadium	Samut Sakhon, Thailand	TKO (Elbow)	3	
2009-11-07	Loss	(Thailand) Tukkatathong Kiatpayathai	Omnoi Stadium	Samut Sakhon, Thailand	Decision	5	3:00
2009-09-21	Loss	(Thailand) Singmanee Kaewsamrit	Daorungchujaroen, Rajadamnern Stadium	Bangkok, Thailand	TKO	3	
For the Rajadamnern Stadium Super Lightweight (63.5kg/140 lbs) title.
2009-08-03	Win	(Thailand) Yodkhunphon Sor. Mongkhonket	Daorungchujaroen, Rajadamnern Stadium	Bangkok, Thailand	KO	4	
2009-07-02	Win	(Thailand) Extra Pinsinchai	Daorungchujaroen, Rajadamnern Stadium	Bangkok, Thailand	Decision	5	3:00
2009-05-14	Loss	(Thailand) Samsamut Kiatchongkhao	Rajadamnern Stadium	Bangkok, Thailand	Decision	5	3:00
Loses Thailand Lightweight (135 lbs) title.
2009-04-16	Win	(Thailand) Sagatpetch IngramGym	Rajadamnern Stadium	Bangkok, Thailand	Decision	5	3:00
2009-02-20	Loss	(Thailand) Nongbee Kiatyongyut	Eminent Air, Lumpinee Stadium	Bangkok, Thailand	Decision	5	3:00
2008-12-22	Loss	(Thailand) Jomthong Chuwattana	Rajadamnern Stadium	Bangkok, Thailand	KO (Liver Shot)	3	
2008-11-20	Loss	(Thailand) Nongbee Kiatyongyut	Kiatyongyut, Rajadamnern Stadium	Bangkok, Thailand	Decision	5	3:00
2008-10-16	Win	(Thailand) Nongbee Kiatyongyut	Rajadamnern Stadium	Bangkok, Thailand	Decision	5	3:00
2008-09-01	Win	(Thailand) Jaroenchai Kesagym	Rajadamnern Stadium	Bangkok, Thailand	KO	4	
Wins Thailand Lightweight (135 lbs) title.
2008-08-04	Win	(Thailand) Samingprai Kiatphontip	Daorungchujarern, Rajadamnern Stadium	Bangkok, Thailand	Decision	5	3:00
2008-	Win	(Thailand) Chalermkiat Kiatphakan	Rajadamnern Stadium	Bangkok, Thailand	Decision	5	3:00
2008-	Draw	(Thailand) Chalermkiat Kiatphakan	Rajadamnern Stadium	Bangkok, Thailand	Decision	5	3:00
2008-04-03	Win	(Thailand) Samsamut Kiatchongkhao	Daorungchujarern, Rajadamnern Stadium	Bangkok, Thailand	Decision	5	3:00
2008-02-14	Win	(Thailand) Chok EmminentAir	Jarumueang, Rajadamnern Stadium	Bangkok, Thailand	KO	4	
2008-01-24	Loss	(Thailand) Anuwat Kaewsamrit	Daorungchujarern, Rajadamnern Stadium	Bangkok, Thailand	Decision	5	3:00
2007-11-15	Win	(Thailand) Saenchai Jirakriangkrai	Jarumueang, Rajadamnern Stadium	Bangkok, Thailand	Decision	5	3:00
2007-04-30	Win	(Thailand) Daopraset Kiatkamphon	Daorungchujarern, Rajadamnern Stadium	Bangkok, Thailand	Decision	5	3:00
2007-03-29	Loss	(Thailand) Samsamut Kiatchongkhao	Jarumueang, Rajadamnern Stadium	Bangkok, Thailand	Decision	5	3:00
2006-12-02	Win	(Thailand) Suadej Skindewgym	Omnoi Stadium	Samut Sakhon, Thailand	Decision	5	3:00
2006-08-01	Win	(Thailand) Diesellek Kor.Rungthanakiat	Saengmorakot, Lumpinee Stadium	Bangkok, Thailand	Decision	5	3:00
2006-05-27	Loss	(Thailand) Thepbancha Tor.Sunthornwiphat	Daorungchujarern, Rajadamnern Stadium	Bangkok, Thailand	KO (Punches)	3	
Legend: Win Loss Draw/No contest Notes
