= Ionuț Atodiresei =

Romanian martial artist

- Born: Ionuț Atodiresei; September 25, 1981 (age 45); Fălticeni, Suceava County, Romania
- Other names: Pitbull
- Nationality: Romanian
- Height: 1.62 m (5 ft 4 in)
- Weight: 64 kg (141 lb; 10 st 1 lb)
- Division: Middleweight
- Style: Kickboxing
- Team: Respect Gym
- Trainer: Alin Panaite; Fitness: Alejandro Argudín-Zaharia
- Years active: 1999–present

Kickboxing record
- Total: 99
- Wins: 92
- By knockout: 17
- Losses: 7

Mixed martial arts record
- Total: 6
- Wins: 3
- By knockout: 1
- Losses: 3

Other information
- Mixed martial arts record from Sherdog
- Last updated on: March 29, 2014

Ionuț Atodiresei (born September 25, 1981) is a Romanian Middleweight kickboxer. As a kickboxer, he fights in the Local Kombat and SUPERKOMBAT Fighting Championships.

== Career ==
Atodiresei was born in Fălticeni, Suceava County. He entered for the first time in a fight hall when he was 13 years old, and made his debut in 1999.

On 25 February 2012, he fought Saša Jovanović for WAKO-Pro K-1 rules super lightweight intercontinental title and lost the fight by unanimous decision. He had revenge on June 9, and Atodiresei won the WAKO-Pro -67 kg intercontinental title defeating Jovanović by decision.

On 7 December 2012, he vacated WAKO-Pro K-1 rules super lightweight intercontinental title and fought Spain's Aitor Eguzkiza for WAKO-Pro K-1 rules light welterweight world title. He won the title after five rounds by split decision.

He was TKO'd by Stauros Exacoustidis for the SuperKombat -65 kg title at SuperKombat World Grand Prix 10 in Craiova, Romania on May 18, 2013.

He defeated Kostas Papedelis at SuperKombat: New Heroes 5 in Târgoviște, Romania on August 30, 2013.

Atodiresei won against Calogero Palmieri by unanimous decision at SuperKombat World Grand Prix 11 in Botoșani, Romania on September 28, 2013.

== Titles ==
=== Professional ===
- 2012 WAKO-Pro -64,5 kg World Title (K-1 rules)
- 2012 WAKO-Pro -62,2 kg Intercontinental Title (K-1 rules)
- 2005 Fight.ro Fight of the Year (vs. Filippo Cinti)
- 2005 WKN -60 kg ThaiBoxing European Champion
- 2004 WKN -62 kg ThaiBoxing European Champion

== Professional kickboxing record ==
Kickboxing record
Date	Result	Opponent	Event	Location	Method	Round	Time
2019-03-09	Loss	(Serbia) Aleksandar Konovalov		Jagodina, Serbia	KO (body kick)	1
For the WAKO Pro Low Kick World Light Welterweight (-64.5kg) title.
2014-03-29	Win	(Greece) Stavros Exakoustidis	SUPERKOMBAT New Heroes 7	Ploiești, Romania	Decision (unanimous)	3	3:00
2013-09-28	Win	(Italy) Calogero Palmieri	SuperKombat World Grand Prix III 2013, Super Fight	Botoșani, Romania	Decision (unanimous)	3	3:00
2013-08-30	Win	(Greece) Kostas Papedelis	SuperKombat NEW HEROES in Dracula's Town	Târgoviște, Romania	Decision (unanimous)	3	3:00
2013-05-18	Loss	(Greece) Stavros Exakoustidis	SuperKombat World Grand Prix II 2013	Craiova, Romania	TKO (referee stoppage)	2	2:59
SuperKombat Light Welterweight (-65kg/143lb) Title eliminator.
2012-12-07	Win	(Spain) Aitor Eguzkiza	Local Kombat Onești	Onești, Romania	Decision (split)	5	3:00
Wins Eguzkiza's WAKO Pro K-1 rules light welterweight world title -64.5 kg.
2012-06-08	Win	(Austria) Saša Jovanović	2012 Local Kombat "The Bodyguard"	Craiova, Romania	Decision (2-1)	5	3:00
Wins Jovanović's WAKO Pro K-1 rules super lightweight intercontinental title -62.2 kg.
2012-05-04	Win	(Serbia) Uroš Živković	2012 Local Kombat "The Bodyguard"	Deva, Romania	KO	2	2:27
2012-02-25	Loss	(Austria) Saša Jovanović	SuperKombat World Grand Prix I 2012	Podgorica, Montenegro	Decision (unanimous)	5	3:00
For WAKO Pro K-1 rules super lightweight intercontinental title -62.2 kg.
2011-10-15	Loss	(Portugal) Diogo Neves	SuperKombat World Grand Prix IV 2011	Piatra Neamț, Romania	Decision (unanimous)	3	3:00
For vacant WAKO Pro K-1 rules welterweight world title -67 kg.
2011-09-16	Win	(Serbia) Aleksandar Topić	Wako-Pro World Grand Prix 2011: Romania vs Serbia, semi finals	Bucharest, Romania	Decision	3	3:00
2011-03-18	Win	(Italy) Fabio Nubile	Wako-Pro World Grand Prix 2011: Romania vs Italy, quarter finals	Bucharest, Romania	Decision	3	3:00
2010-11-20	Win	(Albania) Valdrin Vatnikaj	2010 Local Kombat Sibiu	Sibiu, Romania	Decision	3	3:00
2010-07-16	Loss	(Bulgaria) Veselin Veselinov	Local Kombat "Bătălia Balcanilor"	Constanța, Romania
2010-05-21	Win	(France) Amadou Ba	2010 K-1 WGP Bucharest	Bucharest, Romania	Decision	3	3:00
2010-02-16	Win	(Hungary) Piskoti Gergo	2010 Local Kombat Budapesta	Budapest, Hungary	Decision	3	3:00
2008-06-06	Win	(France) Jeremy Layer	Local Kombat 30	Timișoara, Romania
2008-03-15	Win	(Romania) Cătălin Slave	Local Kombat 29	Arad, Romania
2007-11-03	Win	(Bulgaria) Boyan Dimitrov	Local Kombat 28	Turnu Severin, Romania	Decision	3	3:00
2007-03-02	Win	(Brazil) Remi Conceicao	Local Kombat 25 "Bătaie la poarta Ardealului"	Sibiu, Romania	Decision	3	3:00
2006-12-16	Loss	(France) Modibo Diarra	Local Kombat 24	Bucharest, Romania	Decision	3	3:00
2006-09-29	Win	(Spain) Antonio Raya	Local Kombat 22	Râmnicu Vâlcea, Romania	KO	2	2:12
2006	Win	(Bulgaria) Vladimir Vlatchevalev	Local Kombat	Romania	Decision	3	3:00
2005	Win	(Italy) Patric Carta	Local Kombat	Romania	Decision	3	3:00
2005	Win	(Bulgaria) Vladimir Vlatchevalev	Local Kombat	Bulgaria	KO	1	1:10
2005	Win	(Belgium) Denis Varaksa	WKN 60 kg ThaiBoxing European Champion	Romania	KO	4	2:45
Wins WKN -60 kg ThaiBoxing European Title.
2004-10-22	Win	(Italy) Filipo Cinti	Local Kombat 10	Romania	Decision	5	3:00
Wins WKN -62 kg ThaiBoxing European Title.

== Mixed martial arts record ==
Professional record breakdown
6 matches	3 wins	3 losses
By knockout	1	0
By submission	2	2
By decision	0	1

Res.	Record	Opponent	Method	Event	Date	Round	Time	Location	Notes
Win	3-3	Azamat Mustafaev	Submission (arm-bar)	Real Xtreme Fighting 22 - Romania vs. Poland	March 21, 2016	3	4:59	Bucharest, Romania	
Win	2-3	Robert Micura	Submission (arm-bar)	Real Xtreme Fighting 21 - MMA All Stars 2	December 14, 2015	1	1:36	Bucharest, Romania	
Loss	1-3	Zoltan Turai	Decision (unanimous)	Real Xtreme Fighting 20	October 15, 2015	3	5:00	Sibiu, Romania	
Loss	1-2	Samir Aliev	Submission (leg lock)	Real Xtreme Fighting 17 - Fight Night	March 16, 2015	1	4:18	Craiova, Romania	
Win	1-1	Hamod Omar	KO (punch)	Real Xtreme Fighting 15 - MMA All Stars	December 15, 2014	1	0:03	Bucharest, Romania	
Loss	0-1	Zsolt Fenyes	Submission (guillotine choke)	Real Xtreme Fighting 13 - Fight Night Moldova	Oct 6, 2014	1	3:07	Botoșani, Romania	MMA debut.

== See also ==
- List of male kickboxers
