= BeyNoah =

Japanese kickboxer (born 1995)

- Born: Noah Bey; August 20, 1995 (age 31); Torrance, California, United States
- Other names: Black Panther
- Height: 178 cm (5 ft 10 in)
- Weight: 67.5 kg (149 lb; 10.63 st)
- Division: Featherweight (Kickboxing); Lightweight (MMA)
- Style: Kyokushin Karate, Judo, Kickboxing
- Stance: Orthodox
- Fighting out of: Tokyo, Japan
- Team: AKA (MMA); Ideal Gym (Kickboxing); Kyokushinkaikan Narimasu Dojo (Karate)
- Rank: Black belt in Kyokushin Karate; Black belt in Judo
- Years active: 2016 – present

Kickboxing record
- Total: 23
- Wins: 17
- By knockout: 9
- Losses: 6
- By knockout: 2

Mixed martial arts record
- Total: 9
- Wins: 5
- By knockout: 2
- By decision: 3
- Losses: 4
- By knockout: 2
- By submission: 1
- By decision: 1

Other information
- Mixed martial arts record from Sherdog

Noah Bey (Japanese: ベイノア, Hepburn: Bei Noa; born 20 August 1995) is a Japanese-American kickboxer and mixed martial artist. He currently competes in the super welterweight division of RISE, where he is the former RISE welterweight champion, as well as in the lightweight division of Rizin FF.

== Kickboxing career ==
=== J-NETWORK ===
BeyNoah made his professional debut against Shunsuke Iwata at J-KICK 2016～Honor the fighting spirits～2nd on May 5, 2016. He won the fight by a second-round knockout. Two months later, it was announced that BeyNoah would participate in the J-NETWORK Welterweight Rookies Cup. He was booked to face Hiroki Saiga in the tournament semifinals, which were held at J-FIGHT & J-GIRLS 2016 4th on July 31, 2016. He won the fight by a second-round knockout. He advanced to the semifinals, held at J-KICK 2016～Honor the fighting spirits～3rd on October 10, 2016, where he met Toshiyuki Ohara. BeyNoah won the fight by unanimous decision, after an extra round was contested.

BeyNoah was booked to face Masato Nagai at J-NEXUS 2016～DAY～ on December 25, 2016. He won the fight by a second-round knockout, stopping Nagai with a left hook at the 2:02 minute mark. BeyNoah was next booked to face Ikki Takeichi at J-FIGHT 2017～J-NETWORK 20th Anniversary～ 1st on March 12, 2017. He won the fight by a first-round technical knockout, stopping his opponent after just 26 seconds.

His run of form earned BeyNoah the right to fight the #1 ranked J-Network welterweight contender Yusaku Fujikura for the vacant Welterweight title. The bout was scheduled for J-KICK 2017～J-NETWORK 20th Anniversary～3rd and took place on August 20, 2017. He won the fight by a fifth-round technical knockout. The bout was stopped on the advice of the ringside physician, due to a cut above Fujikura's left eyebrow.

=== RISE ===
==== Early RISE career ====
BeyNoah made his promotional debut with RISE against Masashi Nakajima at RISE 122 on February 4, 2018. He won the fight by a third-round knockout. He won the fight by a third-round knockout.

BeyNoah was scheduled to face Ji Hwan Yang at RISE 125 on June 17, 2018. He won the fight by a first-round flying knee knockout.

BeyNoah faced Akio Kashima at RISE EVOL.1 on September 21, 2018. The fight was stopped at the 2:07 minute mark of the opening round, after BeyNoah successfully knocked Kashima down three times.

==== RISE welterweight champion ====
BeyNoah was booked to face Daiki Watabe for the vacant RISE Welterweight Championship at RISE 129 on November 17, 2018. He won the fight by a dominant unanimous decision, with scores of 50–45, 50–45 and 50–44.

BeyNoah faced the former WBC champion Tapruwan Hadesworkout in a non-title bout at RISE World Series 2019 First Round on March 10, 2019. He lost the fight by a first-round knockout. BeyNoah rebounded from his first professional loss with a unanimous decision victory against Tomo Kiire at RISE 133 on July 5, 2019. He was then scheduled to rematch Tapruwan Hadesworkout at RISE World Series 2019 Final Round on September 16, 2019. BeyNoah avenged his first career loss by unanimous decision, after an extra round was fought.

BeyNoah faced the Shootboxing super lightweight and REBELS super welterweight champion Kaito Ono at SHOOT BOXING GROUND ZERO TOKYO 2019 on December 3, 2019. He lost the fight by unanimous decision, with scores of 50–48, 49–48 and 49–48.

BeyNoah made his first RISE welterweight title defense against the #1 ranked RISE welterweight contender Hideki at RISE 137 on February 23, 2020. He won the fight by unanimous decision, with scores of 49–47, 50–47 and 50–47.

BeyNoah faced Tsukuru Midorikawa at RISE 140 on July 19, 2020. He lost the fight by unanimous decision.

BeyNoah faced Hiromitsu Miyagi at RISE DEAD OR ALIVE 2020 Yokohama on October 11, 2020. He won the fight by a third-round head kick knockout.

BeyNoah faced Yuya at RISE Eldorado 2021 on February 28, 2021. He won the fight by unanimous decision, after an extra round was fought.

BeyNoah faced Negimajin at RISE WORLD SERIES 2021 Yokohama on September 23, 2021. He won the fight by unanimous decision.

In February 2022, BeyNoah vacated the RISE welterweight title in order to move up in weight.

==== Move up in weight ====
BeyNoah was booked to face Kaito Ono in a 71.5 kg catchweight bout at RISE El Dorado 2022 on April 2, 2022. The bout was a rematch of their December 3, 2019 fight, which Kaito won by unanimous decision. He lost the fight by first round knockout.

BeyNoah faced the reigning K-1 Super Welterweight champion Hiromi Wajima in a non-title bout at The Match 2022 on June 19, 2022. He lost the fight by unanimous decision, with all three judges scoring the bout 30–24 for Wajima, as he managed to knock BeyNoah down in every round of the fight.

== Mixed martial arts career ==
BeyNoah made his mixed martial arts debut against Satoshi Yamasu, in a 73 kg catchweight bout, at Rizin 28 – Tokyo on June 16, 2021. He lost the fight by split decision.

BeyNoah was booked to face Daryl Lokoku at Rizin 32 – Okinawa on November 20, 2021. He won the fight by a third-round knockout.

BeyNoah made his lightweight debut against Koji Takeda at Rizin 33 on December 31, 2021. Takeda won the fight by a second-round submission.

Beynoah faced Sho Patrick Usami at Rizin 40 on December 31, 2022. He lost the fight by a first-round knockout.

Beynoah faced Yusaku Inoue at Rizin 46 on April 29, 2024. He won the fight by unanimous decision.

Beynoah next faced UFC veteran Johnny Case at Rizin 47 on June 9, 2024. Case missed weight coming in at 158.7 for this lightweight bout. Beynoah would win the fight via unanimous decision in a fight he would've lost had Case not received a point deduction due to his weight miss.

== Titles and accomplishments ==
=== Kickboxing ===
Professional

- J-NETWORK
  - 2016 J-NETWORK Welterweight Rookies Cup Winner
  - 2017 J-NETWORK Welterweight Championship
- RISE
  - 2018 RISE Welterweight Championship
    - One successful title defense

Amateur

- 2015 Peter Aerts Spirit −70 kg Tournament Winner

=== Karate ===
- IKO Kyokushinkaikan
  - 2012 All Japan High School Championships Middleweight runner-up
  - 2014 Josai Cup runner-up
  - 2016 All Japan Open Best Rookie Award
  - 2017 All Japan Weight Championships Lightweight runner-up
  - 2018 All Japan Weight Championships Lightweight Winner

== Mixed martial arts record ==
Professional record breakdown
10 matches	6 wins	4 losses
By knockout	3	2
By submission	0	1
By decision	3	1

Res.	Record	Opponent	Method	Event	Date	Round	Time	Location	Notes
Win	6–4	Bilal Kai Haga	KO (head kick)	Rizin Landmark 14	June 6, 2026	2	0:10	Sendai, Japan	Catchweight (156.7 lb) bout; Haga missed weight.
Loss	5–4	Tatsuya Saika	KO (head kick)	Rizin: Shiwasu no Cho Tsuwamono Matsuri	December 31, 2025	2	0:32	Saitama, Japan	Catchweight (161 lb) bout.
Win	5–3	Cedric Manhoef	KO (punch)	LFA 213	July 25, 2025	3	0:49	Lemoore, California, United States	Performance of the Night.
Win	4–3	Kohl Laren	Decision (unanimous)	LFA 208	May 9, 2025	3	5:00	Santa Cruz, California, United States	
Win	3–3	Johnny Case	Decision (unanimous)	Rizin 47	June 9, 2024	3	5:00	Tokyo, Japan	Catchweight (158.7 lb) bout; Case missed weight.
Win	2–3	Yusaku Inoue	Decision (unanimous)	Rizin 46	April 29, 2024	3	5:00	Tokyo, Japan	
Loss	1–3	Sho Patrick Usami	KO (punch)	Rizin 40	December 31, 2022	1	0:45	Saitama, Japan	
Loss	1–2	Koji Takeda	Submission (armbar)	Rizin 33	December 31, 2021	2	4:12	Saitama, Japan	Lightweight debut.
Win	1–1	Daryl Lokoku	KO (punch)	Rizin 32	November 20, 2021	3	1:09	Okinawa, Japan	Catchweight (161 lb) bout.
Loss	0–1	Satoshi Yamasu	Decision (split)	Rizin 28	June 16, 2021	3	5:00	Tokyo, Japan	Catchweight (161 lb) bout.

== Kickboxing record ==
Professional Kickboxing & Muay Thai Record
17 Wins (9 (T)KO's), 6 Losses, 0 Draw, 0 No Contest
Date	Result	Opponent	Event	Location	Method	Round	Time
2026-09-10	Loss	(Japan) Meison Hide Usami	Super Rizin 5	Osaka, Japan	Decision (Unanimous)	3	3:00
2022-06-19	Loss	(Japan) Hiromi Wajima	THE MATCH 2022	Tokyo, Japan	Decision (Unanimous)	3	3:00
2022-04-02	Loss	(Japan) Kaito	RISE El Dorado 2022	Tokyo, Japan	KO (Left hook)	1	0:41
2021-09-23	Win	(Japan) Negimajin	RISE WORLD SERIES 2021 Yokohama	Yokohama, Japan	Decision (Unanimous)	3	3:00
2021-02-28	Win	(Japan) Yuya	RISE Eldorado 2021	Yokohama, Japan	Ext.R Decision (Unanimous)	4	3:00
2020-10-11	Win	(Japan) Hiromitsu Miyagi	RISE DEAD OR ALIVE 2020 Yokohama	Yokohama, Japan	KO (Left High Kick)	3	0:55
2020-07-19	Loss	(Japan) Tsukuru Midorikawa	RISE 140	Tokyo, Japan	Decision (Unanimous)	3	3:00
2020-02-23	Win	(Japan) Hideki	RISE 137	Tokyo, Japan	Decision (Unanimous)	5	3:00
Defends the RISE Welterweight Championship.
2019-12-03	Loss	(Japan) Kaito	SHOOT BOXING GROUND ZERO TOKYO 2019	Tokyo, Japan	Decision (Unanimous)	5	3:00
2019-09-16	Win	(Thailand) Tapruwan Hadesworkout	RISE World Series 2019 Final Round	Tokyo, Japan	Ext.R Decision (Unanimous)	4	3:00
2019-07-05	Win	(Japan) Tomo Kiire	RISE 133	Tokyo, Japan	Decision (Unanimous)	3	3:00
2019-03-10	Loss	(Thailand) Tapruwan Hadesworkout	RISE World Series 2019 First Round	Japan	KO (Left Hook)	1	2:10
2018-11-17	Win	(Japan) Daiki Watabe	RISE 129	Tokyo, Japan	Decision (Unanimous)	5	3:00
Wins the vacant RISE Welterweight Championship.
2018-09-21	Win	(Japan) Akio Kashima	RISE EVOL.1	Tokyo, Japan	TKO (3 Knockdowns)	1	2:07
2018-06-17	Win	(Korea) Ji Hwan Yang	RISE 125	Chiba, Japan	KO (Flying Knee)	1	2:18
2018-03-24	Win	(Japan) Yuya	RISE 123	Tokyo, Japan	Decision (Unanimous)	3	3:00
2018-02-04	Win	(Japan) Masashi Nakajima	RISE 122	Tokyo, Japan	KO (Right Cross)	3	0:48
2017-08-20	Win	(Japan) Yusaku Fujikura	J-KICK 2017～J-NETWORK 20th Anniversary～3rd	Tokyo, Japan	TKO (Doctor Stoppage)	5	0:50
Wins the J-NETWORK Welterweight title.
2017-03-12	Win	(Japan) Ikki Takeichi	J-FIGHT 2017～J-NETWORK 20th Anniversary～ 1st	Tokyo, Japan	TKO (Doctor stoppage)	1	0:26
2016-12-25	Win	(Japan) Masato Nagai	J-NEXUS 2016～DAY～	Tokyo, Japan	KO (Right Hook)	2	2:02
2016-10-10	Win	(Japan) Toshiyuki Ohara	J-KICK 2016～Honor the fighting spirits～3rd, Welterweight Rookies Cup Final	Tokyo, Japan	Ext.R Decision (Unanimous)	4	3:00
Wins the 2016 J-NETWORK Welterweight Rookies Cup.
2016-07-31	Win	(Japan) Hiroki Saiga	J-FIGHT & J-GIRLS 2016 4th, Welterweight Rookies Cup Semi Final	Tokyo, Japan	KO (Left Hook)	2	1:25
2016-05-05	Win	(Japan) Shunsuke Iwata	J-KICK 2016～Honor the fighting spirits～2nd	Tokyo, Japan	KO	2	1:13
Legend: Win Loss Draw/No contest Notes

== See also ==
- List of male kickboxers
