= Valdrin Vatnikaj =

Albanian-Belgian kickboxer (born 1988)

- Born: 28 September 1988 (age 38)
- Other names: The Patriot
- Nationality: Albanian; Belgian
- Height: 1.70 m (5 ft 7 in)
- Weight: 63.0 kg (138.9 lb; 9.92 st)
- Division: Lightweight; Welterweight
- Style: Kickboxing • Muay Thai
- Stance: Orthodox
- Fighting out of: Zevenbergen, Netherlands
- Team: SuperPro Sportcenter Zevenbergen
- Years active: 2008–present

Kickboxing record
- Total: 76
- Wins: 60
- Losses: 13
- Draws: 3
- Last updated on: 23 February 2013

Valdrin Vatnikaj (born 28 September 1988) is an Albanian-Belgian kickboxer who competes in the lightweight and welterweight divisions. In 2009, he won the WFCA European Championship before becoming a world champion in 2010 by taking the Kombat League 63.503 kg/140 lb world title.

== Career ==
Vatnikaj is a training partner of Albert Kraus and Rico Verhoeven at the SuperPro Sportcenter Zevenbergen in Zevenbergen, Netherlands. He became the WFCA European Champion in 2009 and won the Kombat League 63.503 kg/140 lb world title the following year.

He challenged Jarkko Jussila for his WAKO Pro European Full Contact Light Welterweight (-64.5 kg/142 lb) Championship at Fight Festival 30 in Helsinki, Finland on 12 March 2011, losing a unanimous decision after ten, two-minute rounds. Vatnikaj hit Jussila with lightning fast counterstrikes throughout the fight, but the Finn's constant pressure and reach advantage was too much for him in the end.

After fighting on the European circuit for a number of years, Vatnikaj debuted on kickboxing's biggest stage, K-1, when he faced off with flashy karateka Kizaemon Saiga in a non-tournament bout at the K-1 World MAX 2011 -70kg Japan Tournament Final in Osaka, Japan on 25 September 2011. Saiga's kicks made the difference in an otherwise uneventful fight as the Japanese fighter cruised to a unanimous decision win.

He knocked out Emil Kerimov via second round left hook at MaxPain in Genk, Belgium on 10 February 2012.

Vatkinaj was a competitor in the A1 World Combat Cup's 32-man 63.5 kg/140 lb tournament held throughout 2012. After knocking out Antony Plouvier at the tournament's opening round in Genk, Belgium on 10 March, he then outpointed Mansour Yaqubi in the second round in Eindhoven, Netherlands on 7 April to book his place at the finals, featuring the eight remaining fighters and held in Eindhoven on 22 September. He took a decision win over Redouane Boukerch in the quarter-finals but lost to Papuna Margvelashvili by the same method in the semis.

Replacing Rachid Boumalek on short notice, he entered the Thai Fight 2012 67 kg/147 lb Tournament and faced the eventual tournament winner Singmanee Kaewsamrit in the quarter-finals in Bangkok, Thailand on 23 October 2012. Vatnikaj opened strong in the first round, connecting with a sweep and some clean punches, but things soon became one way traffic for the Thai in the second round. Singmanee landed two rounds of brutal unanswered body and leg kicks to take home the comfortable decision win.

He fought David Codron in a WKN European Full Contact Super Lightweight (-66.7 kg/147 lb) title match in Pernes-les-Fontaines, France on 23 February 2013 and lost on points after ten, two minute rounds.

== Championships and awards ==
=== Kickboxing ===
- Kombat League
  - Kombat League World 63.503 kg/140 lb Championship
- World Full Contact Association
  - WFCA European Championship

== Kickboxing record ==
Kickboxing record
60 wins, 13 losses, 3 draws
Date	Result	Opponent	Event	Location	Method	Round	Time
2013-03-16	Loss	(France) Mohamed Galaoui	Explosion Fight Night 7	Châteauroux, France	Decision	3	3:00
2013-02-23	Loss	(France) David Codron	World GBC Tour	Pernes-les-Fontaines, France	Decision	10	2:00
For the WKN European Full Contact Super Lightweight (-66.7 kg/147 lb) Championship.
2012-10-23	Loss	(Thailand) Singmanee Kaewsamrit	Thai Fight 2012 67 kg/147 lb Tournament, Quarter Finals	Bangkok, Thailand	Decision	3	3:00
2012-09-22	Loss	(Georgia (country)) Papuna Margvelashvili	A1 World Combat Cup 63.5 kg/140 lb Tournament, Semi Finals	Eindhoven, Netherlands	Decision	3	3:00
2012-09-22	Win	(Morocco) Redouane Boukerch	A1 World Combat Cup 63.5 kg/140 lb Tournament, Quarter Finals	Eindhoven, Netherlands	Decision	3	3:00
2012-04-07	Win	(Iran) Mansour Yaqubi	A1 World Combat Cup 63.5 kg/140 lb Tournament, Second Round	Eindhoven, Netherlands	Decision	3	3:00
2012-03-10	Win	(France) Antony Plouvier	A1 World Combat Cup 63.5 kg/140 lb Tournament, First Round	Genk, Belgium	KO		
2012-02-10	Win	(Azerbaijan) Emil Kerimov	MaxPain	Genk, Belgium	KO (left hook)	2	
2011-10-22	Loss	(Belarus) Yuri Zhukovskiy	W5 Grand Prix	Moscow, Russia	Decision (unanimous)	3	3:00
2011-09-25	Loss	(Japan) Kizaemon Saiga	K-1 World MAX 2011 -70kg Japan Tournament Final	Osaka, Japan	Decision (unanimous)	3	3:00
2011-03-12	Loss	(Finland) Jarkko Jussila	Fight Festival 30	Helsinki, Finland	Decision (unanimous)	10	2:00
For the WAKO Pro European Full Contact Light Welterweight (-64.5 kg/142 lb) Championship.
2010-11-20	Loss	(Romania) Ionuţ Atodiresei	2010 Local Kombat Sibiu	Sibiu, Romania	Decision	3	3:00
2010-10-31	Loss	(Switzerland) David Da Costa			Decision	5	3:00
2008-08-08	Win	(Italy) Alessandro Alias		Sardinia, Italy	KO (right cross)	1	3:00
Legend: Win Loss Draw/No contest Notes
