= Hiroaki Suzuki =

Japanese shoot boxer (born 1984)

- Born: December 6, 1984 (age 41); Aichi, Japan
- Native name: 鈴木 博昭
- Other names: Kaibutsu-kun
- Nationality: (Japan) Japanese
- Height: 1.67 m (5 ft 5 1/2 in)
- Weight: 66 kg (146 lb; 10 st)
- Style: Karate, Shoot boxing
- Fighting out of: Tokyo, Japan
- Team: BELLWOOD FIGHT TEAM

Kickboxing record
- Total: 54
- Wins: 42
- Losses: 12

Mixed martial arts record
- Total: 14
- Wins: 7
- By knockout: 5
- By decision: 2
- Losses: 7
- By knockout: 2
- By decision: 5

Other information
- Mixed martial arts record from Sherdog

Hiroaki Suzuki (Japanese: 鈴木 博昭; born December 6, 1984) is a Japanese shoot boxer and mixed martial artist currently signed to Rizin Fighting Federation. He has also competed for ONE Championship. In shoot boxing, Suzuki is a former SHOOT BOXING World Champion, S-cup World Tournament Champion, and two-time SHOOT BOXING Japan Champion. As of April 2015 he was ranked No. 6 Featherweight kickboxer in the world by Liverkick.

== Kickboxing career ==
=== ONE Championship ===
Hiroaki Suzuki made his ONE Championship debut against Deividas Danyla at ONE Championship: Conquest of Champions on November 23, 2018. Suzuki won by unanimous decision.

Suzuki next faced Mohammed Bin Mahmoud at ONE Championship: Hero's Ascent on January 25, 2019. He won by third-round technical knockout.

After two consecutive wins, Suzuki was booked to challenge Nong-O Gaiyanghadao for the ONE Bantamweight Muay Thai World Championship at ONE Championship: Warriors of Light on May 10, 2019. Suzuki was dominated for the entirety of five rounds by Nong-O's high volume of right kicks and lost via unanimous decision.

Following his loss, Suzuki faced Tukkatatong Petpayathai at ONE Championship: Masters of Fate on November 8, 2019. He lost by split decision.

== Mixed martial arts career ==
=== Rizin Fighting Federation ===
Suzuki made his mixed martial arts debut, facing Keisuke Okuda on October 10, 2021, at Rizin Landmark Vol.1. He won the bout via TKO in the first round.

Suzuki faced Kyohei Hagiwara at Rizin 33 - Saitama on December 31, 2021. He lost the bout via unanimous decision.

Suzuki made his third appearance against Shoji Maruyama Rizin Landmark 2 on March 6, 2022. He won the bout via technical knockout due to a punch finished off with soccer kick in the first round.

Suzuki faced Ren Hiramoto in the main event of Rizin 36 on July 2, 2022. He lost the fight by split decision.

Suzuki faced Jin Aoi at Rizin Landmark 4 on November 6, 2022. He lost the bout via unanimous decision.

Suzuki faced Taisei Nishitani on June 24, 2023, at Rizin 43, knocking out Nishitani less than a minute into the bout.

Suzuki faced Takahiro Ashida at Rizin Landmark 8 on February 24, 2024, winning the bout at the end of the first round via soccer kicks and punches.

== Titles ==
- SHOOT BOXING
  - 2015 SHOOT BOXING World Super Lightweight Champion
  - 2014 S-cup -65 kg World Tournament Champion
  - 2014 SHOOT BOXING World Super Lightweight Champion
  - 2012 SHOOT BOXING World Lightweight Champion

Awards

- eFight.jp
  - Fighter of the Month (November 2013)

== Mixed martial arts record ==
Professional record breakdown
14 matches	7 wins	7 losses
By knockout	5	2
By decision	2	5

Res.	Record	Opponent	Method	Event	Date	Round	Time	Location	Notes
Loss	7–7	Kim Sei-min	TKO (punches and elbows)	Rizin 55	November 8, 2026	2	4:41	Funabashi, Japan	
Win	7–6	Hyuga Miyagawa	TKO (elbows and knees)	Rizin Landmark 15	July 18, 2026	2	3:29	Hiroshima, Japan	
Win	6–6	Huang Yuele	Decision (split)	Rizin 51	September 28, 2025	3	5:00	Nagoya, Japan	
Win	5–6	Sora Yamamoto	Decision (unanimous)	Rizin Landmark 11	June 14, 2025	3	5:00	Sapporo, Japan	
Loss	4–6	Hyuma Yasui	Decision (unanimous)	Rizin Bangaichi	December 31, 2024	3	5:00	Saitama, Japan	
Loss	4–5	Kyouma Akimoto	Decision (unanimous)	Rizin Landmark 10	November 17, 2024	3	5:00	Nagoya, Japan	
Loss	4–4	YA-MAN	KO (punches)	Super Rizin 3	July 28, 2024	1	3:28	Saitama, Japan	
Win	4–3	Takahiro Ashida	TKO (soccer kicks and punches)	Rizin Landmark 8	February 24, 2024	1	4:29	Saga, Japan	
Win	3–3	Taisei Nishitani	KO (punches)	Rizin 43	June 24, 2023	1	0:57	Sapporo, Japan	
Loss	2–3	Jin Aoi	Decision (unanimous)	Rizin Landmark 4	November 6, 2022	3	5:00	Nagoya, Japan	
Loss	2–2	Ren Hiramoto	Decision (split)	Rizin 36	July 2, 2022	3	5:00	Okinawa, Japan	
Win	2–1	Shoji Maruyama	TKO (punch and soccer kick)	Rizin Landmark 2	March 6, 2022	1	1:12	Fukuroi, Japan	
Loss	1–1	Kyohei Hagiwara	Decision (unanimous)	Rizin 33	December 31, 2021	3	5:00	Saitama, Japan	Featherweight debut.
Win	1–0	Keisuke Okuda	TKO (knee and punches)	Rizin Landmark 1	October 2, 2021	1	1:42	Tokyo, Japan	Lightweight debut.

== Kickboxing record ==
Kickboxing Record
42 Wins (15 (T)KO's), 12 Losses, 1 Draw
Date	Result	Opponent	Event	Location	Method	Round	Time
2019-11-08	Loss	(Thailand) Tukkatatong Petpayathai	ONE Championship: Masters Of Fate	Pasay, Philippines	Decision (Split)	3	3:00
2019-05-10	Loss	(Thailand) Nong-O Gaiyanghadao	ONE Championship: Warriors of Light	Bangkok, Thailand	Decision (Unanimous)	5	3:00
For the ONE Bantamweight Muay Thai World Championship.
2019-01-25	Win	(Malaysia) Mohammed Bin Mahmoud	ONE Championship: Hero's Ascent	Pasay, Philippines	TKO	3	2:53
2018-11-23	Win	(Lithuania) Deividas Danyla	ONE Championship: Conquest of Champions	Pasay, Philippines	Decision (Unanimous)	3	3:00
2018-06-08	Loss	(Japan) Fukashi	KNOCK OUT 2018 Survival Days	Tokyo, Japan	Decision (Unanimous)	5	3:00
2018-04-14	Win	(Japan) Shunsuke Oishi	KNOCK OUT Sakura Burst	Tokyo, Japan	KO (Head Kick)	4	0:49
2018-02-10	Win	(Japan) Yuma Yamaguchi	Shoot Boxing 2018 act.1	Tokyo, Japan	Submission (Standing choke)	2	2:35
2017-10-04	Loss	(Japan) Yosuke Mizuochi	KNOCK OUT vol.5	Tokyo, Japan	TKO (Punches)	5	0:33
2017-09-16	Loss	(Japan) Kaito	SHOOT BOXING 2017 act.3	Tokyo, Japan	TKO (Doctor Stoppage)	1	2:18
2017-04-08	Win	(Japan) Hiroto Yamaguchi	Shoot Boxing 2017: Act 2	Tokyo, Japan	KO (Left Elbow)	5	2:29
2016-11-11	Win	(Japan) Hideki	Shoot Boxing World Tournament S-Cup 2016	Tokyo, Japan	Ext.R Decision (Unanimous)	4	3:00
2016-09-19	Win	(United States) Joey Ruquet	Shoot Boxing 2016: Act 4	Tokyo, Japan	TKO (3 Knockowns)	1	2:32
2016-08-07	Draw	(Japan) Kenta	REBELS 45	Osaka, Japan	Decision	3	3:00
2016-03-26	Win	(Japan) Yuki	RISE 110	Tokyo, Japan	Decision (Majority)	3	3:00
2016-02-13	Loss	(Thailand) Tapruwan Hadesworkout	SHOOT BOXING 2016: Act 1	Tokyo, Japan	Decision (Majority)	3	3:00
2015-12-01	Loss	(Netherlands) Zakaria Zouggary	30th ANNIVERSARY “GROUND ZERO TOKYO 2015”	Tokyo, Japan	Decision (Unanimous)	3	3:00
2015-08-22	Win	(Angola) Christian Baya	SHOOT BOXING 30th ANNIVERSARY “CAESAR TIME!” World Super Lightweight Tournament, Final	Tokyo, Japan	Decision (Unanimous)	3	3:00
Wins the SHOOT BOXING World Super Lightweight title.
2015-08-22	Win	(Poland) Rafal Dudek	SHOOT BOXING 30th ANNIVERSARY “CAESAR TIME!” World Super Lightweight Tournament, Semi Final	Tokyo, Japan	Decision (Unanimous)	3	3:00
2015-06-21	Loss	(Thailand) Tapruwan Hadesworkout	Shoot Boxing 2015 SB 30th Anniversary	Tokyo, Japan	Decision (Majority)	3	3:00
2015-04-18	Win	(United States) Daniel Romero	SHOOT BOXING 2015 ～SB30th Anniversary～ act.2	Tokyo, Japan	Decision (Unanimous)	3	3:00
2014-11-30	Win	(Netherlands) Zakaria Zouggary	SHOOT BOXING WORLD TOURNAMENT S-cup 2014, Final	Tokyo, Japan	2nd Ext.R TKO (Punches)	5	2:00
Wins the 2014 SHOOT BOXING S-Cup -65kg World Tournament.
2014-11-30	Win	(Morocco) Mosab Amrani	SHOOT BOXING WORLD TOURNAMENT S-cup 2014, Semi Final	Tokyo, Japan	Decision (Majority)	3	3:00
2014-11-30	Win	(Thailand) Pornsanae Sitmonchai	SHOOT BOXING WORLD TOURNAMENT S-cup 2014, Quarter Final	Tokyo, Japan	KO (Left High Kick)	3	2:52
2014-09-20	Win	(Japan) Shinsuke Hirai	SHOOT BOXING 2014 act.4	Tokyo, Japan	TKO	1	3:00
Wins the SHOOT BOXING Japan Super Lightweight title.
2014-06-21	Win	(Korea) Lee Sung-hyun	SHOOT BOXING 2014 act.3	Tokyo, Japan	Decision (Unanimous)	5	3:00
2014-04-13	Win	(Netherlands) Zakaria Zouggary	SHOOT BOXING in TOYOKAWA UNCHAIN.1	Aichi, Japan	Decision (Majority)	3	3:00
2014-02-23	Win	(Netherlands) Eldrich Torrell	SHOOT BOXING 2014 act.1	Tokyo, Japan	Decision (Unanimous)	3	3:00
2013-11-16	Win	(Japan) Michihiro Omigawa	SHOOT BOXING BATTLE SUMMIT ～GROUND ZERO TOKYO 2013, S-cup -65 kg Japan Tournament Final	Tokyo, Japan	KO (Flying Knee)	2	1:54
Wins the SHOOT BOXING S-cup 2013 65kg Japan Tournament.
2013-11-16	Win	(Japan) Yuki	SHOOT BOXING BATTLE SUMMIT ～GROUND ZERO TOKYO 2013, S-cup -65 kg Japan Tournament Semi Final	Tokyo, Japan	Decision (Unanimous)	3	3:00
2013-11-16	Win	(Nepal) Mohan Dragon	SHOOT BOXING BATTLE SUMMIT ～GROUND ZERO TOKYO 2013, S-cup -65 kg Japan Tournament Quarter Final	Tokyo, Japan	TKO (2 Knockdowns)	2	2:17
2013-09-23	Win	(Thailand) Bovy Sor Udomson	SHOOT BOXING 2013 act.4	Tokyo, Japan	Decision (Unanimous)	3	3:00
2013-06-23	Win	(Japan) Shunichi Shimizu	SHOOT BOXING 2013 act.3	Tokyo, Japan	Decision (Unanimous)	3	3:00
2013-04-20	Loss	(Nepal) Mohan Dragon	SHOOT BOXING 2013 act.2	Tokyo, Japan	KO (Right hook)	1	2:51
2012-11-17	Win	(Norway) Joachim Hansen	SHOOTO BOXING WORLD TOURNAMENT S-cup 2012	Tokyo, Japan	Ext.R Decision (Unanimous)	4	3:00
2012-06-03	Win	(Japan) Hiroki Shishido	SHOOT BOXING 2012 ～Road to S-cup～ act.3	Tokyo, Japan	Decision (Unanimous)	5	3:00
2012-04-13	Win	(Japan) Takeshi Inoue	SHOOT BOXING 2012～Road to S-cup～act.2	Tokyo, Japan	KO (Right hook)	3	3:00
2012-02-12	Win	(Japan) Yuuji Sagawara	SHOOT BOXING 2012 Young Caesar Cup Central #3	Tokyo, Japan	Decision (Unanimous)	3	3:00
Wins the SHOOT BOXING Japan Lightweight title.
2011-11-06	Win	(Japan) Akiyo Nishiura	SHOOT the SHOOTO 2011	Tokyo, Japan	Decision (Unanimous)	3	3:00
2011-04-23	Win	(Korea) Kim Hu	SHOOTO BOXING 2011 act.2 -SB168-	Tokyo, Japan	Decision (Unanimous)	3	3:00
2011-02-19	Win	(Japan) Shigeki Osawa	SHOOTO BOXING 2011 act.1 -SB166-	Tokyo, Japan	Decision (Unanimous)	3	3:00
2010-11-23	Win	(Japan) Mitsuhiro Ishida	Shoot Boxing World Tournament 2010	Tokyo, Japan	KO (Left cross)	2	2:20
2010-09-18	Loss	(Thailand) Tapruwan Hadesworkout	SHOOT BOXING 25TH ANNIVERSARY SERIES -ISHIN- 4	Tokyo, Japan	Decision (Majority)	5	3:00
2010-06-06	Win	(Japan) Tenkei Fujimiya	SHOOT BOXING 25TH ANNIVERSARY SERIES -ISHIN- 3	Tokyo, Japan	Ext.R Decision (Split)	4	3:00
2010-04-11	Win	(Japan) Akifumi Utagawa	SHOOT BOXING 25TH ANNIVERSARY SERIES -ISHIN- 2	Tokyo, Japan	Decision	3	3:00
2010-02-13	Win	(Japan) Koji Isahikawa	SHOOT BOXING 25TH ANNIVERSARY SERIES -ISHIN- 1	Tokyo, Japan	KO (Right hook)	1	1:06
2009-09-04	Loss	(Japan) Tomohiro Oikawa	SHOOT BOXING 2009 -bushido- 4	Tokyo, Japan	Decision (Unanimous)	5	3:00
For the SHOOT BOXING Japan Featherweight title.
2009-06-01	Win	(Japan) Tomohiro Oikawa	SHOOT BOXING 2009 -bushido- 3	Tokyo, Japan	KO (Punches)	3	3:00
2009-04-03	Win	(Japan) Akifumi Utagawa	SHOOT BOXING 2009 -bushido- 2	Tokyo, Japan	Decision (Unanimous)	3	3:00
2009-02-11	Win	(Japan) Kouya Shimada	SHOOT BOXING 2009 -bushido- 1	Tokyo, Japan	Decision (Unanimous)	3	3:00
2008-10-25	Win	(Japan) Masahiro Knuckle Kida	SHOOT BOXING 2008 Young Caesar OSAKA	Osaka, Japan	KO	2	2:41
2008-09-12	Win	(Japan) Yoshiki Harada	SHOOT BOXING 2008 火魂〜Road to S-cup〜 5	Tokyo, Japan	Decision (Unanimous)	3	2:00
2008-07-21	Win	(Japan) Tatsumi Yuda	SHOOT BOXING 2008 火魂〜Road to S-cup〜 4	Tokyo, Japan	Decision (Unanimous)	3	2:00
2008-05-28	Loss	(Japan) Yasuhiro Motomura	SHOOT BOXING 2008 火魂〜Road to S-cup〜 3	Tokyo, Japan	TKO (3 Knockdowns)	2	0:55
2008-03-30	Win	(Japan) Gaku Sakai	HEAT 6	Nagoya, Japan	TKO (Corner stoppage)	2	0:55
Legend: Win Loss Draw/No contest Notes

== See also ==
- List of male kickboxers
