= Saenchainoi Nongkeesuwit =

Thai Muay Thai fighter

Saenchainoi
- Born: Matee Srinok; October 31, 1985 (age 41); Nong Ki district, Buriram province, Thailand
- Other names: Saenchainoi Phunpanmuang (แสนชัยน้อย พุ่มพันธ์ม่วง); Saenchainoi Saendetgym (แสนชัยน้อย แสนเดชยิม); Saenchainoi Sor.Laddawan (แสนชัยน้อย ส.ลัดดาวัลย์); Saenchainoi Thaicharoen (แสนชัยน้อย ไทยเจริญ); Saenchainoi Aor.Wikitchai (แสนชัยน้อย อ.วิกิจชัย); Saenchainoi Puenrattana (แสนชัยน้อย ปืนรัตนา); Saenchainoi Nongkeepahuyut (แสนชัยน้อย หนองกี่พาหุยุทธ); Saenchainoi Wor.Petchpoon (แสนชัยน้อย ว.เพชรพูล); Saenchainoi Toyotarayong (แสนชัยน้อย โตโยต้าระยอง); Saenchainoi WaisengGym
- Height: 1.74 m (5 ft 8 1/2 in)
- Weight: 61 kg (134 lb; 9.6 st)
- Stance: Southpaw
- Fighting out of: Bangkok, Thailand

Other information
- Occupation: Muay Thai trainer

Saenchainoi Nongkeesuwit (แสนชัยน้อย หนองกี่สุวิทย์) is a Thai retired Muay Thai fighter.

== Biography and career ==
Saenchainoi started training in Muay Thai at the age of 12 in the Buriram province. He started competing in Bangkok in 2000 and won his first title, the World Muay Thai Council 108 lbs championship in 2002.

On October 31, 2008, Saenchainoi faced Saenchai in the Lumpinee Stadium. He lost the fight by decision.

On July 23, 2011, Saenchainoi faced Antoine Pinto at the Thailand Versus Challenger Series 2011. He lost the fight by unanimous decision.

On February 23, 2013, Saenchainoi faced Jose Neto at THAI FIGHT Extreme 2013: Muay Thai Day. He won the fight by decision.

On June 11, 2015, Saenchainoi faced Liu Xang Wei at Final Legend Macao. He won the fight by decision.

As of 2022 he was working as a trainer in Hong Kong.

== Titles and accomplishments ==
- World Muaythai Council
  - 2002 WMC World Light Flyweight (108) lbs Champion
- Professional Boxing Association of Thailand (PAT)
  - 2007 Thailand 130 lbs Champion
- Siam Omnoi Stadium
  - 2010 Isuzu Cup Runner-up
- World Boxing Council
  - 2008 WBC Muay Thai World 135 lbs Champion
- Onesongchai
  - S1 World 130 lbs Champion

== Fight record ==
Professional Muaythai record
Date	Result	Opponent	Event	Location	Method	Round	Time
2015-06-11	Win	(China) Lu Xiang Wei	Macau Muay Thai Championship	Macau	KO (Low kicks)	1	
2014-12-09	Loss	(Uzbekistan) Mansurbek Tolipov	The King Of Fighters 2014	Hong Kong	Decision	5	3:00
2013-02-23	Win	(Brazil) Jose Neto	THAI FIGHT	Thailand	Decision	3	3:00
2012-12-31	Loss	(China) Yi Long	Wu Lin Feng	Beijing, China	Decision	3	3:00
2011-	Loss	(Thailand) Saksurin Kiatyongyut	Omnoi Stadium - Isuzu Cup	Samut Sakhon, Thailand	Decision	5	3:00
2011-11-26	Loss	(Thailand) Superbon Lookjaomaesaivare	Omnoi Stadium - Isuzu Cup	Samut Sakhon, Thailand	Decision	5	3:00
2011-09-17	Loss	(Thailand) Phetasawin Seatranferry	Omnoi Stadium - Isuzu Cup	Samut Sakhon, Thailand	Decision	5	3:00
For the vacant Thailand Welterweight (147 lbs) title.
2011-07-23	Loss	(France) Antoine Pinto	Thailand Versus Challenger Series 2011	Bangkok, Thailand	Decision (Unanimous)	5	3:00
2011-06-13	Win	(Thailand) Singmanee Kaewsamrit	Yodwanpadej, Rajadamnern Stadium	Bangkok, Thailand	Decision	5	3:00
2011-05-07	Win	(Thailand) Chok EminentAir	Lumpinee Stadium	Bangkok, Thailand	Decision	5	3:00
2011-04-01	Draw	(Thailand) Chok EminentAir	Phumphanmuang, Lumpinee Stadium	Bangkok, Thailand	Decision	5	3:00
2011-02-28	Loss	(Thailand) Jaroenchai Jor.Rachadakon	Rajadamnern Stadium	Bangkok, Thailand	Decision	5	3:00
2010-08-05	Loss	(Thailand) Saksurin Kafaefasai	Kiatyongyut, Rajadamnern Stadium	Bangkok, Thailand	KO (Knee)	3	
2010-06-29	Loss	(Thailand) Tukkatathong Phetpayathai	Eminent Air, Rajadamnern Stadium	Bangkok, Thailand	Decision	5	3:00
2010-04-24	Loss	(Thailand) Petchmankong Petchfergus	Omnoi Stadium - Isuzu Cup, Final	Samut Sakhon, Thailand	Decision	5	3:00
For the 2010 Isuzu Cup (135 lbs) title.
2010-02-27	Win	(Thailand) Nongbee Kiatyongyut	Omnoi Stadium - Isuzu Cup Semi Final	Samut Sakhon, Thailand	Decision	5	3:00
2010-01-09	Loss	(Thailand) Tukkatathong Phetpayathai	Omnoi Stadium - Isuzu Cup	Samut Sakhon, Thailand	Decision	5	3:00
2009-12-12	Win	(Thailand) Phetasawin Seatranferry	Omnoi Stadium	Samut Sakhon, Thailand	TKO (Elbow)	3	
2009-11-14	Loss	(Thailand) Puja Sor.Suwanee	Omnoi Stadium	Samut Sakhon, Thailand	Decision	5	3:00
2009-07-24	Loss	(Thailand) Petchmankong Petchfergus	Fairtex, Lumpinee Stadium	Bangkok, Thailand	Decision	5	3:00
2009-05-19	Win	(Thailand) Attachai Fairtex	Fairtex, Lumpinee Stadium	Bangkok, Thailand	Decision	5	3:00
2009-03-31	Loss	(Thailand) Petchmankong Petchfergus	Petchyindee, Lumpinee Stadium	Bangkok, Thailand	Decision	5	3:00
2009-03-07	Win	(Thailand) Attachai Fairtex	Lumpinee Krikrai, Lumpinee Stadium	Bangkok, Thailand	Decision	5	3:00
2008-11-21	Loss	(Thailand) Petchmankong Petchfergus	Pumpanmuang, Lumpinee Stadium	Bangkok, Thailand	Decision	5	3:00
2008-11-01	Loss	(Thailand) Petchmankong Petchfergus	Pumpanmuang, Rajadamnern Stadium	Bangkok, Thailand	Decision	5	3:00
2008-10-31	Loss	(Thailand) Saenchai Sor.Kingstar	Lumpini Champion Krikkrai Lumpinee Stadium	Bangkok, Thailand	Decision	5	3:00
2008-09-30	Win	(Thailand) Orono Wor Petchpun	Lumpini Champion Krikkrai, Lumpinee Stadium	Bangkok, Thailand	Decision	5	3:00
2008-09-04	Loss	(Thailand) Saenchai Sor.Kingstar	Daorungprabat, Rajadamnern Stadium	Bangkok, Thailand	Decision	5	3:00
2008-06-24	Win	(Thailand) Singdam Kiatmuu9	Lumpinee Stadium	Bangkok, Thailand	Decision	5	3:00
2008-04-29	Win	(Thailand) Attachai Fairtex	Paironan, Lumpinee Stadium	Bangkok, Thailand	Decision	5	3:00
2008-01-30	Win	(Thailand) Nongbee Kiatyongyut	Kiatyongyut, Rajadamnern Stadium	Bangkok, Thailand	Decision	5	3:00
2007-10-04	Loss	(Thailand) Orono Muangseema	Onesongchai, Rajadamnern Stadium	Bangkok, Thailand	Decision	5	3:00
For the S-1 130 lbs title.
2007-08-30	Loss	(Thailand) Nopparat Keatkhamtorn	Onesongchai, Rajadamnern Stadium	Bangkok, Thailand	Decision	5	3:00
2007-06-25	Loss	(Thailand) Bovy Sor Udomson	Onesongchai, Rajadamnern Stadium	Bangkok, Thailand	Decision	5	3:00
2007-02-05	Win	(Thailand) Kem Sitsongpeenong	Onesongchai, Rajadamnern Stadium	Bangkok, Thailand	Decision	5	3:00
2006-12-28	Loss	(Thailand) Kem Sitsongpeenong	Phetthongkam, Rajadamnern Stadium	Bangkok, Thailand	Decision	5	3:00
2006-10-19	Loss	(Thailand) Kem Sitsongpeenong	Onesongchai, Rajadamnern Stadium	Bangkok, Thailand	Decision	5	3:00
2006-08-31	Loss	(Thailand) Nongbee Kiatyongyut	Onesongchai, Rajadamnern Stadium	Bangkok, Thailand	Decision	5	3:00
2006-07-05	Win	(Thailand) Jomthong Chuwattana	Onesongchai, Rajadamnern Stadium	Bangkok, Thailand	Decision	5	3:00
2006-05-29	Loss	(Thailand) Puja Sor.Suwanee	OneSongchai, Rajadamnern Stadium	Bangkok, Thailand	Decision	5	3:00
2006-04-07	Win	(Thailand) Longoen Phittakruchaiden	Phetsuphapan, Lumpinee Stadium	Bangkok, Thailand	Decision	5	3:00
2006-03-06	Loss	(Thailand) Anuwat Kaewsamrit	Onesongchai, Rajadamnern Stadium	Bangkok, Thailand	TKO	3	
2006-02-07	Win	(Thailand) Yodbuangam Lukbanyai	Paironan, Lumpinee Stadium	Bangkok, Thailand	Decision	5	3:00
2005-12-22	Loss	(Thailand) Puja Sor.Suwanee	Onesongchai, Rajadamnern Stadium	Bangkok, Thailand	Decision	5	3:00
2005-11-16	Win	(Thailand) Anuwat Kaewsamrit	Onesongchai, Rajadamnern Stadium	Bangkok, Thailand	Decision	5	3:00
2005-09-22	Win	(Thailand) Bovy Sor Udomson	Onesongchai, Rajadamnern Stadium	Bangkok, Thailand	Decision	5	3:00
2005-08-	Win	(Thailand) Saengsakda Khaadisorn	Sanam Luang	Bangkok, Thailand	KO	2	
2005-08-18	Win	(Thailand) Saenchoenglek Jirakriangkrai	Rajadamnern Stadium	Bangkok, Thailand	TKO (Referee stoppage)	4	
2005-07-26	Loss	(Thailand) Sarawut Lukbanyai	Phetburapha, Rajadamnern Stadium	Bangkok, Thailand	Decision	5	3:00
2005-06-30	Win	(Thailand) Jomthong Chuwattana	Jarumuang, Rajadamnern Stadium	Bangkok, Thailand	Decision	5	3:00
2005-06-06	Loss	(Thailand) Sayannoi Kiatpraphat	Onesongchai, Rajadamnern Stadium	Bangkok, Thailand	Decision	5	3:00
2005-05-13	Win	(Thailand) Yutajak Kaewsamrit	Piranan, Lumpinee Stadium	Bangkok, Thailand	Decision	5	3:00
2005-04-	Win	(Thailand) Yutajak Kaewsamrit	Lumpinee Stadium	Bangkok, Thailand	Decision	5	3:00
2005-03-14	Win	(Thailand) Orono Muangseema	Onesongchai, Rajadamnern Stadium	Bangkok, Thailand	Decision	5	3:00
2005-01-20	Win	(Thailand) Phongsing Kiatchansing	Onesongchai, Rajadamnern Stadium	Bangkok, Thailand	Decision	5	3:00
2004-12-25	Win	(Thailand) Ronnachai Naratreekul	Omnoi Stadium	Samut Sakhon, Thailand	Decision	5	3:00
2004-11-13	Loss	(Thailand) Ronnachai Naratreekul	Onesongchai	Surin province, Thailand	Decision	5	3:00
2004-09-09	Win	(Thailand) Kornpetch Phetrachabhat	Rajadamnern Stadium	Bangkok, Thailand	Decision	5	3:00
2004-07-08	Draw	(Thailand) Srisuwan Sitkruwinai	Onesongchai, Rajadamnern Stadium	Bangkok, Thailand	Decision	5	3:00
2004-06-07	Loss	(Thailand) Phongsing Kiatchansing	Onesongchai, Rajadamnern Stadium	Bangkok, Thailand	Decision	5	3:00
2004-04-19	Win	(Thailand) Danchai Tor.Silachai	Onesongchai, Rajadamnern Stadium	Bangkok, Thailand	Decision	5	3:00
2004-02-16	Win	(Thailand) Pornsanae Sitmonchai	Rajadamnern Stadium	Bangkok, Thailand	Decision	5	3:00
2004-01-19	Loss	(Thailand) Wanmeechai Menayothin	Rajadamnern Stadium	Bangkok, Thailand	Decision	5	3:00
2003-12-21	Loss	(Thailand) Pornsanae Sitmonchai	Rajadamnern Stadium	Bangkok, Thailand	Decision	5	3:00
2003-11-09	Win	(Thailand) Kanchai Kor.Bangkruai	Onesongchai, Rajadamnern Stadium	Bangkok, Thailand	Decision	5	3:00
2003-10-16	Loss	(Thailand) Phongsing Kiatchansing	Onesongchai, Rajadamnern Stadium	Bangkok, Thailand	Decision	5	3:00
For the Rajadamnern Stadium Super Flyweight (115 lbs) title.
2003-06-18	Loss	(Thailand) Orono Sor.Sakulphan	Onesongchai, Rajadamnern Stadium	Bangkok, Thailand	Decision	5	3:00
2003-05-22	Win	(Thailand) Sitrak Asawayothin	Onesongchai, Rajadamnern Stadium	Bangkok, Thailand	Decision	5	3:00
2003-04-26	Loss	(Thailand) Thongchai Tor.Silachai	Onesongchai	Thailand	Decision	5	3:00
For the vacant WMC World Super Flyweight (115 lbs) title.
2003-03-24	Win	(Thailand) Thaweesak Singklong4	Onesongchai, Rajadamnern Stadium	Bangkok, Thailand	Decision	5	3:00
2002-12-19	Win	(Thailand) Jompop Kiatponthip	Onesongchai, Rajadamnern Stadium	Bangkok, Thailand	Decision	5	3:00
2002-10-23	Loss	(Thailand) Kwanpichit Hor.Pattanachai	Onesongchai, Rajadamnern Stadium	Bangkok, Thailand	Decision	5	3:00
2002-	Win	(Thailand) Praduthong Naratrikul		Bangkok, Thailand	Decision	5	3:00
Wins the vacant WMC World Light Flyweight (108 lbs) title.
2002-03-25	Loss	(Thailand) Grade A Wanmaneenoi	Kiatsingnoi, Rajadamnern Stadium	Bangkok, Thailand	Decision	5	3:00
Legend: Win Loss Draw/No contest Notes
