= Singmanee Kaewsamrit =

Thai Muay Thai kickboxer (born 1982)

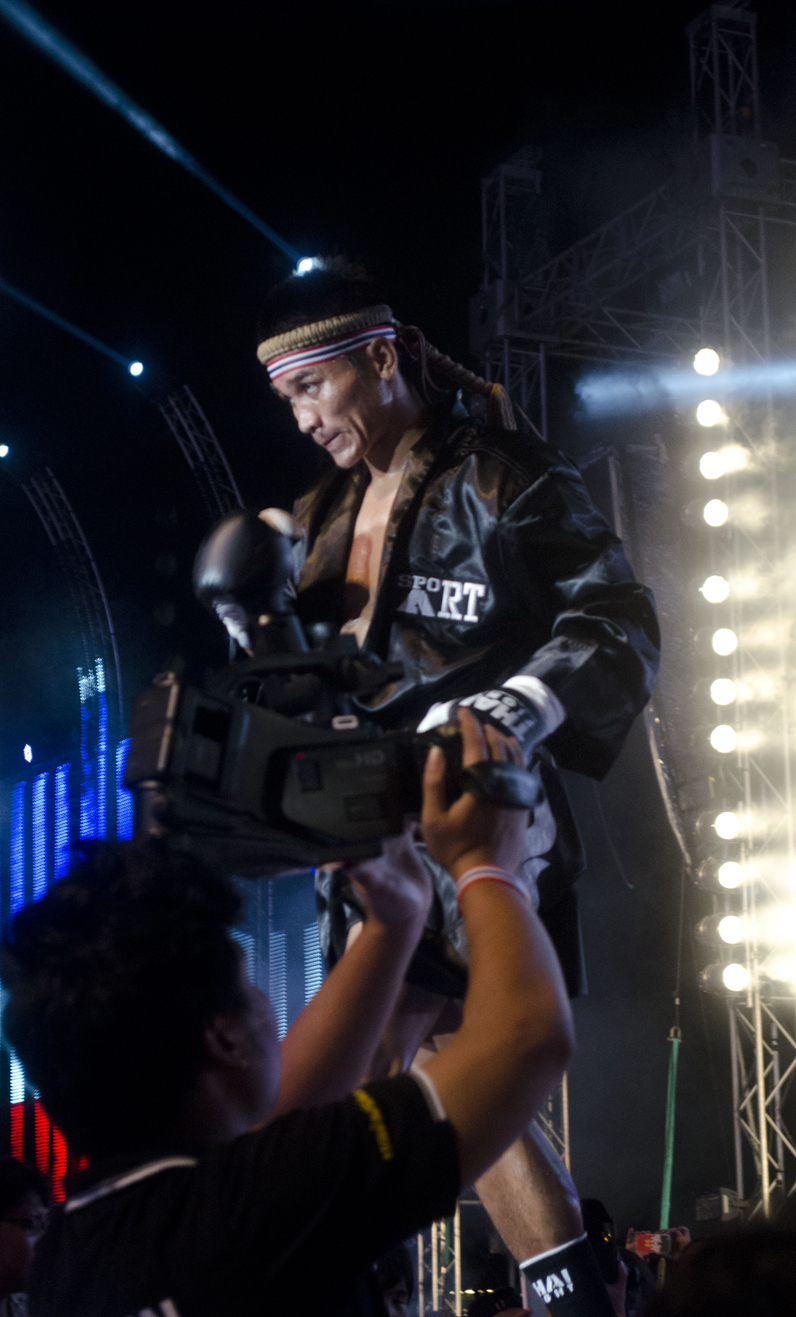
- Singmanee at the Thai Fight 2012 Final
- Born: 14 April 1982 (age 44)
- Native name: สิงห์มณี แก้วสัมฤทธิ์
- Other names: Singmanee Sor.Srisompong
- Height: 1.74 m (5 ft 8 1/2 in)
- Weight: 67.0 kg (147.7 lb; 10.55 st)
- Division: Welterweight
- Style: Muay Thai
- Stance: Southpaw
- Fighting out of: Bangkok, Thailand
- Team: Kaewsamrit; Srisompong

Kickboxing record
- Total: 204
- Wins: 167
- Losses: 32
- Draws: 5
- Last updated on: September 16, 2020

Singmanee Kaewsamrit (Thai: สิงห์มณี แก้วสัมฤทธิ์; born April 14, 1982) is a Thai Muay Thai kickboxer. He is the former Rajadamnern Stadium Champion, WMC and WPMF Welterweight Champion. He is also the 2012 Thai Fight 67 kg Champion and Isuzu Cup 22 Champion.

== Biography and career ==
His weight is between 64 kg and 67 kg

He faced Houcine Bennoui at Thai Fight: Lyon on September 19, 2012, in Lyon, France and lost via decision after three rounds.

He was scheduled to face Rachid Boumalek in the quarter-finals of the 2012 Thai Fight 67 kg Tournament at Thai Fight 2012: King of Muay Thai on October 23, 2012, in Bangkok. However, Boumalek pulled out and was replaced by Valdrin Vatnikaj, who Singmanee beat by decision.

He then beat Mehdi Zatout by unanimous decision in the tournament semi-finals in Nakhon Ratchasima, Thailand on November 25, 2012.

He defeated Andrei Kulebin on points in the final on December 16, 2012, to win the tournament.

Singmanee stopped Salardine Etnaker with a liver shot to retain his WPMF belt at Muaythai Superfight in Pattaya on June 14, 2013.

He will put his WPMF welterweight strap on the line against Sean Kearney at the King's Cup 2013 in Bangkok, Thailand on December 4, 2013.

He lost to Desrit Poptheeratham on points on March 17, 2014.

He lost to Kem Sitsongpeenong via TKO due to a cut in round two at Muay Thai in Macau on June 6, 2014.

== Titles and achievements ==
- EM Legend
  - 2016 Emei Legend 65 kg Tournament Champion.
- Faith Fight
  - 2016 Faith Fight 67 kg Champion.
- Thai Fight
  - Thai Fight 2012 67 kg Tournament Champion
- World Professional Muaythai Federation
  - 2012 W.P.M.F. World Welterweight champion (147 lbs)
- Omnoi Stadium
  - 2012 22nd Isuzu Cup Tournament Winner
- Channel 3 TV
  - 2008 Channel 3 TV Super Lightweight Champion (140 lbs)
- World Muaythai Council
  - 2007 WMC Super Lightweight champion (140 lbs)
- Rajadamnern Stadium
  - 2007 Rajadamnern Stadium Super Lightweight champion (140 lbs)

== Fight record ==
Professional Muaythai record
167 Wins, 32 Losses, 5 Draws
Date	Result	Opponent	Event	Location	Method	Round	Time
2025-11-25	Loss	(Hong Kong) Tse Kit Shing	EM Legend X	Hong Kong	Decision	3	3:00
For the EM Legend Greater Bay Area 70kg Gold Belt.
2019-03-17	Win	(Thailand) Buakiew Sitsongpeenong	Miracle Muay Thai Festival, Final	Ayutthaya, Thailand	KO	1	
2019-03-17	Win	(Iran) Hossein Nasiri	Miracle Muay Thai Festival, Semi Final	Ayutthaya, Thailand	KO	1	
2019-2-23	Loss	(Cambodia) Roeung Sophorn	CNC Kun Khmer BTB	Cambodia	Decision	3	3:00
2018-11-2	Win	(Cambodia) Vong Noy	CNC Kun Khmer	Cambodia	KO	3	
2018-03-17	Win	(Thailand) Numkabuan Kiatnavy	Miracle Muay Thai Festival, Final	Ayutthaya, Thailand	KO	1	
2018-03-17	Win	(Brazil) Luis Cajaiba	Miracle Muay Thai Festival, Semi Final	Ayutthaya, Thailand	Decision	3	3:00
2018-03-17	Win	(Brazil) Wesley Da Silva	Miracle Muay Thai Festival, Quarter Final	Ayutthaya, Thailand	KO	2	
2018-01-20	Loss	(China) Zhang Chenlong	Emei Legend 27	Kunming, China	Decision (Unanimous)	3	3:00
2017-12-02	Win	(Greece) Giannis Skordilis	Emei Legend 26	Emei, China	KO	2	
2017-10-31	Loss	(Belarus) Andrei Kulebin	World Muaythai Charity Fight	Hong Kong	Decision	5	3:00
2017-09-29	Win	(Thailand) Hiroya	EM Legend 23	China	Decision (unanimous)	3	3:00
2017-05-27	Win	(Brazil) Maykol Yurk	Emei Legend 19	Jiangyou, China	KO	2	
2017-05-27	Win	(China) Li Chenchen	Emei Legend 19	Jiangyou, China	KO	1	
2017-05-13	Loss	(France) Bobo Sacko	La Nuit Des Titans 4	France	Decision	5	3:00
2016-12-23	Win	(Japan) Rukiya Anpo	Emei Legend 15, 65 kg Tournament, final	Emei, China	Decision	3	3:00
Wins Emei Legend 65kg Tournament title..
2016-12-23	Win	(Thailand) Manas Thodkui	Emei Legend 15, 65 kg Tournament, semifinal	Emei, China	Ext. R Decision	4	3:00
2016-12-17	Win	(China) Zhang Wanxin	Faith Fight Kickboxing	China	Decision (Unanimous)	3	3:00
Retains the Faith Fight 67kg Title.
2016-11-26	Win	(Thailand) Phosa Nopphorn	Faith Fight Kickboxing, 67 kg Tournament final	China	Decision (Unanimous)	3	3:00
Wins Faith Fight 67kg Title.
2016-11-19	Win	(China) Meng GuoDong	Emei Legend 14, 65 kg Tournament, quarterfinal	Emei, China	Decision (Unanimous)	3	3:00
2016-10-29	Win	(Iran) Masoud Abdolmaleki	Faith Fight Kickboxing, 67 kg Tournament semifinal	Emei, China	Decision (Unanimous)	3	3:00
2016-10-01	Win	(Australia) Matty Bune	E-1 World Championship	China	KO	1	
2016-08-27	Win	(Hungary) Speth Norbert Attila	Faith Fight Kickboxing, 67 kg Tournament quarterfinal	China	Decision (Unanimous)	3	3:00
2016-04-02	Win	(Uzbekistan) Bobirjon Tagaev	Emei Legend 7, 65 kg Tournament, Group C final	Xichang, China	TKO	2	
2016-04-02	Win	(China) Lyu Junyu	Emei Legend 7, 65 kg Tournament, Group C semifinal	Xichang, China	Decision	3	
2016-03-16	Win	(France) Yohann Drai	PAT & WPMF Championship	Ayutthaya, Thailand	Decision	5	3:00
Retains the WPMF World Welterweight title (147 lbs).
2016-02-20	Win	(China) Zhang Chunyu	QUSN	China	Decision	3	
2015-08-07	Loss	(France) Azize Hlali	West Coast Fighting	Lacanau, France	Decision	5	
2015-06-12	Win	(Iran) Vahid Shabazi	Final Legend	China	Decision	3	
2015-03-17	Win	(Thailand) Saksonkram Poptheeratham	Miracle MuayThai	Ayutthaya, Thailand	Decision	5	3:00
Retains the WPMF World Welterweight title (147 lbs).
2014-12-04	Win	(Russia) Timur Mamatisakov	King's birthday celebration MuayThai competition	Bangkok, Thailand	Decision	5	3:00
Wins WPMF World Welterweight title (147 lbs).
2014-06-06	Loss	(Thailand) Kem Sitsongpeenong	Muay Thai in Macau	Macau	TKO (cut)	2	
2014-03-24	Loss	(Thailand) Dejrit Poptheeratham	Miracle Muay Thai Festival	Phra Nakhon Si Ayutthaya, Thailand	Decision	5	3:00
For the WPMF World Welterweight title (147 lbs).
2013-12-27	Win	(France) Jimmy Vienot	Klongsarn	Bangkok, Thailand	Decision	5	3:00
2013-12-04	Win	(Canada) Sean Kearney	King's Cup 2013	Bangkok, Thailand	KO (left low kick)	3	
Retains the WPMF World Welterweight title (147 lbs).
2013-09-07	Loss	(France) Mehdi Zatout		France	Decision	5	3:00
For WBC Muaythai World Welterweight title (147 lbs).
2013-07-26	Win	(Brazil) Adaylton Freitas		Bangkok, Thailand	Decision	5	3:00
Retains WPMF World Welterweight title (147 lbs).
2013-06-14	Win	(France) Salahdine Ait Naceur	Muaythai Superfight	Pattaya, Thailand	KO (right hook to the body)	1	
Retains WPMF World Welterweight title (147 lbs).
2013-05-17	Win	(Thailand) Chalee Sor Chaitamin	Bangla Stadium	Phuket, Thailand	KO	3	
.
2013-03-17	Win	(France) Azize Hlali	World Muay Thai Festival 2013	Ayutthaya, Thailand	Decision	5	3:00
Retains WPMF World Welterweight title (147 lbs).
2012-12-16	Win	(Belarus) Andrei Kulebin	THAI FIGHT 2012: Final Round, 67 kg Tournament Final	Bangkok, Thailand	Decision	3	3:00
Wins the 2012 THAI FIGHT 67kg Tournament title.
2012-11-25	Win	(Morocco) Mehdi Zatout	THAI FIGHT 2012: 2nd Round, 67 kg Tournament Semi-Finals	Nakhon Ratchasima, Thailand	Decision (unanimous)	3	3:00
2012-10-23	Win	(Albania) Valdrin Vatnikaj	THAI FIGHT 2012: 1st Round, 67 kg Tournament Quarter-Finals	Bangkok, Thailand	Decision	3	3:00
2012-09-19	Loss	(France) Houcine Bennoui	THAI FIGHT EXTREME 2012: France	Lyon, France	Decision	3	3:00
2012-08-17	Win	(France) Houcine Bennoui	THAI FIGHT EXTREME 2012: England	Leicester, England	Decision	3	3:00
2012-06-24	Win	(Belarus) Andrei Kulebin	Channel 11 "Thailand vs. Russia"	Pattaya, Thailand	Decision	5	3:00
Wins WPMF World Welterweight title (147 lbs).
2012-04-17	Win	(Thailand) Sudsakorn Sor Klinmee	THAI FIGHT EXTREME 2012: Pattaya	Pattaya, Thailand	Decision	3	3:00
2012-03-24	Win	(Thailand) Superball Lookjaomaesaivaree	Isuzu Tournament Final, Omnoi Stadium	Bangkok, Thailand	Decision	5	3:00
Wins 22nd Isuzu Cup Tournament Welterweight title (145-147 lbs).
2012-01-21	Win	(Thailand) Phetasawin Seatranferry	Isuzu Tournament Semi Final, Omnoi Stadium	Bangkok, Thailand	KO (Right Hook)	3	
2011-11-19	Win	(Thailand) Noppakrit Namplatrahoymuk	Isuzu Tournament, Omnoi Stadium	Bangkok, Thailand	Decision	5	3:00
2011-10-08	Win	(Thailand) Ekusung Kor Rungtanakiat	Isuzu Tournament, Omnoi Stadium	Bangkok, Thailand	Decision	5	3:00
2011-09-03	Win	(Thailand) Samranchai 96 Peenung	Isuzu Tournament, Omnoi Stadium	Bangkok, Thailand	Decision	5	3:00
2011-06-13	Loss	(Thailand) Saenchainoi Phumphanmuang	Yodwanpadej, Rajadamnern Stadium	Bangkok, Thailand	Decision	5	3:00
2011-05-21	Win	(Thailand) Songniyom Pumpanmuang	Fuktien Group Tournament, Omnoi Stadium	Bangkok, Thailand	Decision	5	3:00
2011-04-16	Loss	(Thailand) Sitthichai Sitsongpeenong	Fuktien Group Tournament, Omnoi Stadium	Bangkok, Thailand	Decision	5	3:00
2011-03-20	Win	(Thailand) Pong Sak Lek	Muaythai Gala	Surin, Thailand			
2010-06-05	Loss	(France) Fabio Pinca	La Nuit des Challenges 8	Lyon, Saint-Fons, France	Decision (Unanimous)	5	3:00
2010-03-10	Win	(Thailand) Olan Kaewsamrit	Daorungchujaroen Fight, Rajadamnern Stadium	Bangkok, Thailand	Decision	5	3:00
2009-12-05	Loss	(Russia) Igor Petrov	Battle of Champions 4	Moscow, Russia	Decision	3	3:00
2009-10-21	Win	(Thailand) Kongfar Eminentair	Yodwanpaded Fight, Rajadamnern Stadium	Bangkok, Thailand	Disqualification	4	
2009-10-13	Win	(Thailand) Khomkaew Russada	Bangla Boxing Stadium	Patong, Thailand	Decision	5	3:00
Retains Channel 3 TV Super Lightweight title (140 lbs).
2009-09-21	Win	(Thailand) Phetasawin Seatranferry	Daorungchujaroen Fight, Rajadamnern Stadium	Bangkok, Thailand	TKO	3	
Retains Rajadamnern Stadium Super Lightweight title (63.5kg/140 lbs).
2009-08-09	Win	(Thailand) Kengkard	Channel 9 TV	Bangkok, Thailand	Decision	5	3:00
2009-07-09	Win	(Thailand) Petchmankong Kaiyanghadaogym	Omnoi Stadium	Samut Sakhorn, Thailand	KO (Right Hook)	4	
2009-02-20	Win	(Thailand) Kongfah Auddonmuang	Eminentair Fight, Lumpinee Stadium	Bangkok, Thailand	Decision	5	3:00
2009-01-19	Win	(Thailand) Big Ben Chor Praram 6	Daorungchujaroen Fights, Rajadamnern Stadium	Bangkok, Thailand	Decision	5	3:00
2008-12-13	Win	(Thailand) Thanongdet Chengsimiewgym	Siam Omnoi Stadium	Samut Sakhorn, Thailand	Decision	5	3:00
2008-08-14	Loss	(Thailand) Khem Fairtex	Jarumueang fights, Rajadamnern Stadium	Bangkok, Thailand	KO (Right overhand)	5	0:59
2008-07-03	Win	(Thailand) Jaroenchai Kesagym	Daorungchujarern Fights, Rajadamnern Stadium	Bangkok, Thailand	Decision	5	3:00
2008-05-25	Draw	(Thailand) Noppadet Chengsimiwgym	BBTV TV7 Channel	Bangkok, Thailand	Decision draw	5	3:00
Fight was for Noppadet's BBTV Channel 7 Stadium Super Lightweight title (140 lbs).
2008-03-09	Win	(Japan) Hiroki Ishii	SNKA "Magnum 16"	Bunkyo, Tokyo, Japan	Decision (Unanimous)	5	3:00
Retains Rajadamnern Stadium & WMC World Super Lightweight titles (63.5kg/140 lbs).
2007-10-27	Win	(Thailand) Saiyok Pumpanmuang	Rajadamnern Stadium	Bangkok, Thailand	Decision	5	3:00
Wins Rajadamnern Stadium & WMC World Super Lightweight titles (63.5kg/140 lbs).
2007-08-09	Win	(Thailand) Nampon P.K. Stereo	Rajadamnern Stadium	Bangkok, Thailand	KO (Body punches)	2	
2007-03-15	Win	(Thailand) Surarit Phetnongkee	Daowrungchujarern Fights, Rajadamnern Stadium	Bangkok, Thailand	Decision	5	3:00
2006-11-12	Loss	(Thailand) Tapluang Bor Chor Ror.2	Chujarean, Rajadamnern Stadium	Bangkok, Thailand	Decision	5	3:00
2006-10-12	Loss	(Thailand) Kongjak Sor. Tuanthong	Bangrajan Fights, Rajadamnern Stadium	Bangkok, Thailand	Decision	5	3:00
2006-08-27	Win	(Thailand) Artpon Por. Samranchai	Rajadamnern Chujarean TTV Fights, Rajadamnern Stadium	Bangkok, Thailand	TKO	3	
2006-08-06	Win	(Thailand) Daochai Sitniran	Rajadamnern Chujarean TTV Fights, Rajadamnern Stadium	Bangkok, Thailand	TKO	3	
2006-07-02	Loss	(Thailand) Sonkom Jockygym	Rajadamnern Chujarean TTV, Rajadamnern Stadium	Bangkok, Thailand	Decision	5	3:00
2006-06-05	Win	(Thailand) Tawatchai Lukmaerampoei	Daorungchujarean Fights, Rajadamnern Stadium	Bangkok, Thailand	TKO	4	
2006-02-09	Loss	(Thailand) Tapluang Bor Chor Ror.2	Daorungchujarean Fights, Rajadamnern Stadium	Bangkok, Thailand	Decision	5	3:00
2005-10-26	Win	(Thailand) Singdam Sor. Boonya	Jarumueang Fights, Rajadamnern Stadium	Bangkok, Thailand	Decision	5	
2004-04-14	Loss	(Thailand) Tapluang Bor Chor Ror.2	Daorungchujarean Fights, Rajadamnern Stadium	Bangkok, Thailand	Decision	5	3:00
2004-02-23	Loss	(Thailand) Sornkom Kiatnukoon	Daorungchujarean + Jarumueang Fights, Rajadamnern Stadium	Bangkok, Thailand	Decision	5	3:00
2003-12-10	Win	(Thailand) Tapluang Bor Chor Ror.2	SUK Petchmahanak, Rajadamnern Stadium	Bangkok, Thailand	Decision	5	3:00
2003-09-29	Loss	(Thailand) Klangsuan Sasiprapagym	SUK Daorungchujarean, Rajadamnern Stadium	Bangkok, Thailand	Decision	5	3:00
2003-08-27	Loss	(Thailand) Jkkawanlak Saktewan	SUK Daorungchujarean, Rajadamnern Stadium	Bangkok, Thailand	Decision	5	3:00
2003-07-21	Win	(Thailand) Srisawat Sakmueangkong	Suk Daorungchujarearn & Jarumueang, Rajadamnern Stadium	Bangkok, Thailand	Decision	5	
Legend: Win Loss Draw/No contest Notes

== Lethwei record ==
Professional Lethwei record
0 wins (0 (T)KOs), 0 losses, 4 draws
Date	Result	Opponent	Event	Location	Method	Round	Time
2019-04-15	Draw	(Myanmar) Thway Thit Win Hlaing	Myanmar vs. Thailand Challenge Fights	Myawaddy Township, Myanmar	Draw	5	3:00
2018-06-23	Draw	(Myanmar) Soe Lin Oo	Myanmar Lethwei Fight	Mandalay, Myanmar	Draw	5	3:00
2017-11-19	Draw	(Myanmar) Saw Gaw Mu Do	Lethwei Nation Fight 3	Yangon, Myanmar	Draw	5	3:00
2017-01-05	Draw	(Myanmar) Phyan Thway	NME Battle For Glory	Taungoo, Myanmar	Draw	5	3:00
Legend: Win Loss Draw/No contest Notes

== See also ==
- List of male kickboxers
