= Tapruwan Hadesworkout =

Thai kickboxer

Tapruwan
- Born: April 1, 1983 (age 43); Nakhon Ratchasima Province, Thailand
- Other names: Tapluang Force Gym; Tapluang BorChorRor.2 (ทัพหลวง บชร.2)
- Nationality: Thai
- Height: 174 cm (5 ft 9 in)
- Weight: 65 kg (143 lb; 10.2 st)
- Style: Muay Thai
- Stance: Orthodox
- Fighting out of: Hiroshima, Japan
- Team: Hades Workout Gym (Japan)

Kickboxing record
- Total: 108
- Wins: 74
- Losses: 33
- Draws: 1

Other information
- Occupation: Muay Thai trainer

Tapluang Bor.Chor.Ror.2 (ทัพหลวง บชร.2) also known as Tapruwan Hadesworkout (タップロン・ハーデスワークアウト) in Japan is a Thai Muay Thai fighter and kickboxer.

== Biography and career ==
On November 12, 2006 Tapluang defeated Singmanee Kaewsamrit by decision after knocking him down in the third round. Following this win Tapluang was top five ranked in the 140 lbs division at Rajadamnern Stadium.

In 2007 Tapruwan traveled to Japan to compete at MAJKF KICK GUTS 2007. He defeated Sota by first round knockout to win the WMAF World Super Lightweight title.

One February 13, 2016 Tapruwan defeated the reigning Shoot Boxing Super Lightweight champion Hiroaki Suzuki by majority decision at SHOOT BOXING 2016 act.1.

On November 11, 2016 Tapruwan took part in the S-Cup -65 kg World Tournament. In Quarter final he defeated Yosuke Mizuochi by TKO in the first round. He was eliminated in the next round by Zakaria Zouggary who defeated him by unanimous decision.

On March 10, 2019 Tapruwan defeated the reigning RISE Kickboxing Welterweight champion BeyNoah by first round knockout, he landed a perfect left hook two minutes and ten seconds into the fight.

On November 17, 2019 Tapruwan took part in the Zaimax one night 8-man Tournament put on by Japan Kickboxing Innovation. He won his quarter final fight by first round TKO against Yosuke Mizuochi. In Semi Final he defeated Masa Sato by unanimous decision. In the final he defeated Sho Ogawa by unanimous decision to win the tournament.

On September 23, 2021 Tapruwan faced the RISE Kickboxing Lightweight champion Kento Haraguchi at RISE WORLD SERIES 2021 Yokohama. He scored a knockdown in the second round with a knee to the head before losing the fight by TKO in the next round.

== Titles and accomplishments ==
- Japan Kickboxing Innovation
  - 2019 ZAIMAX Muay Thai -65 kg Tournament Winner
- World Muay Thai Council
  - WMC World Featherweight Champion
- Martial Arts Japan Kickboxing Federation
  - 2007 WMAF World Super Lightweight Champion

== Fight record ==
Muaythai & Kickboxingrecord
74 Wins, 34 Losses, 1 Draw, 0 No Contest
Date	Result	Opponent	Event	Location	Method	Round	Time
2023-07-09	Loss	(Japan) Kenta Yamada	NO KICK NO LIFE	Tokyo, Japan	KO (High kick)	1	1:13
2022-08-21	Win	(Japan) Hiroto Yamaguchi	RISE WORLD SERIES OSAKA 2022	Osaka , Japan	TKO	3	2:50
2022-01-22	Loss	(Japan) Chihiro Suzuki	KNOCK OUT 2022 vol.1	Tokyo, Japan	KO (Punches)	1	2:17
2021-09-23	Loss	(Japan) Kento Haraguchi	RISE WORLD SERIES 2021 Yokohama	Yokohama, Japan	TKO (Punches)	3	1:35
2021-07-11	Win	(Japan) Tetsuya Yamato	NJKF - Yamato Gym 50th Anniversary Yamato Matsuri	Nagoya, Japan	TKO (Doctor Stoppage)	1	2:32
2020-02-11	Win	(Japan) Shinji Suzuki	KNOCK OUT CHAMPIONSHIP.1	Tokyo, Japan	Decision (Unanimous)	3	3:00
2019-11-17	Win	(Japan) Sho Ogawa	Japan Kickboxing Innovation 6 - ZAIMAX MUAYTHAI -65 kg Tournament Final	Okayama, Japan	Decision (Unanimous)	3	3:00
Wins the ZAIMAX MUAYTHAI Tournament -65kg title.
2019-11-17	Win	(Japan) Masa Sato	Japan Kickboxing Innovation - ZAIMAX MUAYTHAI -65 kg Tournament, Semi Final	Okayama, Japan	Decision (Unanimous)	3	3:00
2019-11-17	Win	(Japan) Yosuke Mizuochi	Japan Kickboxing Innovation - ZAIMAX MUAYTHAI -65 kg Tournament, Quarter Final	Okayama, Japan	TKO (Punches)	1	2:16
2019-09-16	Loss	(Japan) BeyNoah	RISE World Series 2019 Final Round	Tokyo, Japan	Ext.R Decision (Unanimous)	4	3:00
2019-07-21	Loss	(Japan) Kosei Yamada	RISE World Series Semi Finals	Tokyo, Japan	Decision (Majority)	3	3:00
2019-03-10	Win	(Japan) BeyNoah	RISE World Series 2019 First Round	Tokyo, Japan	KO (Left Hook)	1	
2018-12-23	Win	(Japan) Yuya Yamato	Hoost Cup Kings Nagoya 5	Nagoya, Japan	Decision (Unanimous)	3	3:00
2018-09-08	Draw	(Japan) Kenta	KNOCK OUT 2018 OSAKA 2nd	Osaka, Japan	Decision (Majority)	5	3:00
2018-02-10	Loss	(Japan) Kaito Ono	SHOOT BOXING 2018 act.1	Tokyo, Japan	KO (Punches & Knees)	4	2:36
2017-11-26	Loss	(Japan) Katsuki Kitano	HOOST CUP KINGS OSAKA 2	Osaka, Japan	Ext.R Decision (Unanimous)	4	3:00
2017-10-18	Loss	(Korea) Jin Sijun	Japan Kickboxing Innovation - Okayama Gym show	Okayama, Japan	Decision (Majority)	3	3:00
2016-12-23	Win	(Japan) Yuya Oohara	ACCEL vol.35	Kobe, Japan	TKO	2	2:57
2016-11-11	Loss	(Netherlands) Zakaria Zouggary	SHOOT BOXING WORLD TOURNAMENT S-Cup 2016, Semi Final	Tokyo, Japan	Decision (Unanimous)	3	3:00
2016-11-11	Win	(Japan) Yosuke Mizuochi	SHOOT BOXING WORLD TOURNAMENT S-Cup 2016, Quarter Final	Tokyo, Japan	TKO (Right Hook)	1	0:40
2016-10-09	Win	(Japan) Tiger Ikuo	Japan Kickboxing Innovation 3	Okayama, Japan	Decision (Unanimous)	3	3:00
2016-06-05	Win	(Japan) MASAYA	SHOOT BOXING 2016 act.3	Tokyo, Japan	KO (Left Cross)	3	0:25
2016-04-03	Loss	(Japan) UMA	SHOOT BOXING 2016: Act 2	Tokyo, Japan	TKO (Punches)	2	0:42
2016-02-13	Win	(Japan) Hiroaki Suzuki	SHOOT BOXING 2016: Act 1	Tokyo, Japan	Decision (Unanimous)	3	3:00
2015-08-22	Loss	(Angola) Christian Baya	SHOOT BOXING 30th Anniversary “CAESAR TIME!” World Tournament, Semi Final	Tokyo, Japan	Ext.R KO (Right Hook)	4	0:37
2015-06-21	Win	(Japan) Hiroaki Suzuki	Shoot Boxing 2015 SB 30th Anniversary	Tokyo, Japan	Decision (Unanimous)	3	3:00
2015-03-21	Win	(Japan) Joichiro Shimo	RISE 104	Tokyo, Japan	KO	2	2:53
2014-10-26	Win	(Japan) UMA	REBELS.31	Tokyo, Japan	Decision (Unanimous)	3	3:00
2014-07-12	Win	(Japan) Naoki	RISE 100 ~BLADE 0~	Tokyo, Japan	Decision (Unanimous)	3	3:00
2014-03-30	Loss	(Japan) Yasuomi Soda	RISE 98	Tokyo, Japan	Decision (Unanimous)	3	3:00
2014-02-09	Win	(Japan)	Shoot Boxing	Japan	KO (Left Hook)	2	
2013-12-23	Win	(Japan) Shinsuke Hirai	SHOOT BOXING	Osaka, Japan	Decision (Unanimous)	3	3:00
2012-02-05	Loss	(Japan) Yusuke Sugawara	SHOOT BOXING 2012 ～Road to S-cup～ act.1	Tokyo, Japan	Ext.R Decision (Unanimous)	4	3:00
2011-01-30	Win	(Japan) Masatoshi Hyakutake	SHOOT BOXING Young Caesar Cup OSAKA 2011	Osaka, Japan	Decision (Unanimous)	3	3:00
2010-09-18	Win	(Japan) Hiroaki Suzuki	SHOOT BOXING 25TH ANNIVERSARY SERIES -ISHIN- 4	Tokyo, Japan	Decision (Majority)	5	3:00
2007-08-12	Win	(Japan) Sota	MAJKF KICK GUTS 2007	Tokyo, Japan	KO (Left Hook)	1	0:38
Wins the WMAF World Super Lightweight title.
2007-04-01	Loss	(Thailand) Komkaew Sitromsai	Chujaroen, Rajadamnern Stadium	Bangkok, Thailand	KO	4	
2007-02-13	Win	(Thailand) Attaphon Fairtex	Chujaroen, Rajadamnern Stadium	Bangkok, Thailand	Decision	5	3:00
2006-11-12	Win	(Thailand) Singmanee Sor.Srisompong	Chujarean, Rajadamnern Stadium	Bangkok, Thailand	Decision	5	3:00
2006-02-09	Win	(Thailand) Singmanee Sor.Srisompong	Daorungchujarean, Rajadamnern Stadium	Bangkok, Thailand	Decision	5	3:00
2004-09-30	Loss	(Thailand) Jaroenchai Kesagym	Daorungchujaroen, Rajadamnern Stadium	Bangkok, Thailand	Decision	5	3:00
2004-09-01	Win	(Thailand) Duangprateep SasiprapaGym	Jarumueang, Rajadamnern Stadium	Bangkok, Thailand	Decision	5	3:00
2004-07-28	Win	(Thailand) Reurob Nor.Sripung	Daorungchujarean + Jarumueang, Rajadamnern Stadium	Bangkok, Thailand	KO	4	
2004-05-30	Win	(Japan) Katsumori Maita	SNKA Super-Hybrid	Tokyo, Japan	Decision (Unanimous)	3	3:00
2004-04-14	Win	(Thailand) Singmanee Sor.Srisompong	Daorungchujarean, Rajadamnern Stadium	Bangkok, Thailand	Decision	5	3:00
2004-03-11	Win	(Thailand) Suwitnoi Sor Wanchat	Daorungchujarean, Rajadamnern Stadium	Bangkok, Thailand	Decision	5	3:00
2004-01-24	Loss	(Thailand) Panmongkol Keertisangat	Daorungchujarean + Jarumueang, Rajadamnern Stadium	Bangkok, Thailand	Decision	5	3:00
2003-12-10	Loss	(Thailand) Singmanee Sor.Srisompong	Petchmahanak, Rajadamnern Stadium	Bangkok, Thailand	Decision	5	3:00
2003-11-03	Win	(Thailand) Rambo Panyathip	Daorungchujarean + Jarumueang, Rajadamnern Stadium	Bangkok, Thailand	KO	3	
2003-08-06	Win	(Thailand) Teerachai Muangsurin	Daorungchujarean, Rajadamnern Stadium	Bangkok, Thailand	Decision	5	3:00
Legend: Win Loss Draw/No contest Notes
