= Kenta Yamada =

Japanese kickboxer

Kenta
- Born: 山田健太; June 26, 1987 (age 39); Gunma Prefecture, Japan
- Nationality: Japanese
- Height: 174 cm (5 ft 9 in)
- Weight: 67 kg (148 lb; 10.6 st)
- Style: Muay Thai, Kickboxing
- Stance: Orthodox
- Fighting out of: Tokyo, Japan
- Team: E.S.G.

Kickboxing record
- Total: 116
- Wins: 68
- By knockout: 20
- Losses: 40
- Draws: 8

Kenta (健太) is a Japanese professional kickboxer. Kenta was ranked the number 9 kickboxer at the super featherweight division(68 kg) by Combat Press for November 2026.

== Titles and accomplishments ==
- New Japan Kickboxing Federation
  - 2008 NJKF Welterweight Champion
  - 2010 NJKF Super Welterweight Champion (1 Defense)
  - 2014 NJKF Welterweight Champion
- Krush
  - 2011 Krush -70 kg Champion
- World Boxing Council Muaythai
  - 2014 WBC Muay Thai Japan Welterweight Champion
  - 2016 WBC Muay Thai Japan Welterweight Champion (1 Defense)
- Suk Wan Kingthong
  - 2024 Suk Wan Kingthong Super Lightweight Champion

Awards

- eFight.jp
  - Fighter of the Month (July 2011)

== Fight record ==
Professional Kickboxing Record
69 Wins (20 (T)KO's), 41 Losses, 9 Draws, 0 No Contest
Date	Result	Opponent	Event	Location	Method	Round	Time
2025-06-08	Draw	(Japan) Rintaro Yoshida	NJKF King of Challenger	Tokyo, Japan	Ext.R Decision	4	3:00
2025-02-02	Loss	(Japan) Rintaro Yoshida	NJKF Challenger 7	Tokyo, Japan	Decision (Majority)	5	3:00
2024-06-14	Draw	(Japan) Kanta Motoyama	NJKF CHALLENGER 5	Tokyo, Japan	Decision (Majority)	3	3:00
2024-06-14	Loss	(Cambodia) Maeun Meikhea	Kun Khmer	Cambodia	KO (Flying Knee)	2	
2024-05-17	Win	(Japan) KJ Hiroshi	NO KICK NO LIFE	Tokyo, Japan	Decision (Majority)	3	3:00
2024-04-14	Win	(Japan) Possible K	Suk Wan Kingthong "Advance"	Tokyo, Japan	Decision (Split)	5	3:00
Wins the vacant Suk Wan Kingthong Super Lightweight title.
2024-03-14	Loss	(Cambodia) Eh Amarin Phouthong	Town Boxing	Cambodia	TKO (Doctor stoppage)	2	
2024-02-25	Win	(Japan) Ryotaro	KNOCK OUT 2024 vol.1	Tokyo, Japan	Decision (Unanimous)	3	3:00
2024-01-06	Loss	(China) Er Kang	Kunlun Fight	China	Decision	3	3:00
2023-11-26	Loss	(Japan) Muga	JKA KICK insist 17 - JKA vs NJKF	Tokyo, Japan	TKO	2	1:55
2023-10-22	Win	(Thailand) Saenghartit YZ'D	Suk Wan Kingthong "Aggressive"	Tokyo, Japan	KO (Right cross)	1	2:14
2023-07-09	Win	(Thailand) Tapruwan Hadesworkout	NO KICK NO LIFE	Tokyo, Japan	KO (High kick)	1	1:13
2023-05-14	Loss	(Thailand) Sorgraw Petchyindee Academy	HOOST CUP - KICKBOXING WORLD CUP IN JAPAN	Tokyo, Japan	Decision (Unanimous)	3	3:00
2023-02-11	Win	(Japan) Tomo Kiire	NO KICK NO LIFE	Tokyo, Japan	Decision (Majority)	3	3:00
2022-12-18	Win	(Japan) Yuma Yamahata	HOOST CUP KINGS NAGOYA 12	Nagoya, Japan	Decision (Majority)	3	3:00
2022-09-23	Loss	(Japan) Renta Wor.Wanchai	The Battle of Muay Thai "OUROBOROS"	Tokyo, Japan	Decision (Unanimous)	3	3:00
2022-06-06	Loss	(Japan) Takuma	NJKF 2022 2nd	Tokyo, Japan	Decision (Unanimous)	3	3:00
2022-04-03	Loss	(Japan) Riku Sit Sor	Suk Wan Kingthong: Keep going!	Tokyo, Japan	Decision (Unanimous)	3	3:00
2022-02-12	Loss	(Japan) Kiyomitsu Samuel Nagasawa	NJKF 2022 1st	Tokyo, Japan	Decision (Unanimous)	5	3:00
For the WBC Muay Thai Japan Lightweight title.
2022-01-09	Loss	(Japan) Yosuke Morii	NO KICK NO LIFE	Tokyo, Japan	Decision (Unanimous)	5	3:00
2021-11-07	Loss	(Thailand) Kiewsonsaeng Flyskygym	BOM WAVE 06 – Get Over The COVID-19	Yokohama, Japan	Decision (Unanimous)	5	3:00
2021-09-19	Win	(Japan) Shoya Suzuki	NJKF 2021 3rd	Tokyo, Japan	Decision (Unanimous)	3	3:00
2021-07-04	Loss	(Japan) Nobu Bravely	The Battle Of Muay Thai WAVE 05 - Get over the COVID-19	Yokohama, Japan	Decision (Unanimous)	5	3:00
For the BOM Super Lightweight title.
2021-06-06	Loss	(Japan) Yota Shigemori	SNKA MAGNUM 54	Tokyo, Japan	Decision (Unanimous)	3	3:00
2021-04-11	Win	(Japan) Koki	BOM WAVE04 pt.1 ~ Get Over The COVID-19 ~	Yokohama, Japan	TKO (3 Knockdwns)	2	2:45
2021-02-12	Win	(Japan) Kazuma Takahashi	NJKF 2021 1st	Tokyo, Japan	Decision (Majority)	5	3:00
2020-12-27	Loss	(Japan) Sho Ogawa	Hoost Cup Kings Nagoya 8	Nagoya, Japan	Decision	3	3:00
For the Hoost Cup Japan Super Lightweight title.
2020-10-25	Loss	(Japan) Kota Takahashi	SNKA MAGNUM 53	Tokyo, Japan	Decision (Majority)	5	3:00
2020-09-12	Loss	(Japan) Katsuki Kitano	NJKF 2020 3rd	Tokyo, Japan	Decision (Split)	3	3:00
2020-01-10	Loss	(Thailand) Sangmanee Sathianmuaythai	ONE Championship: A New Tomorrow	Bangkok, Thailand	Decision (Unanimous)	3	3:00
2019-11-30	Draw	(Korea) Kyung Jae Cho	NJKF 2019 4th	Tokyo, Japan	Decision (Majority)	3	3:00
2019-08-16	Loss	(Thailand) Muangthai PKSaenchaimuaythaigym	ONE Championship: Dreams of Gold	Bangkok, Thailand	Decision (Unanimous)	3	3:00
2019-06-02	Win	(Thailand) Joe Seishikai	NJKF 2019 2nd	Tokyo, Japan	KO (Right Hook)	2	1:06
2019-05-03	Win	(Lithuania) Deividas Danyla	ONE Championship: For Honor	Jakarta, Indonesia	Decision (Split)	3	3:00
2019-03-08	Loss	(Thailand) Phetmorakot Petchyindee Academy	ONE Championship: Reign of Valor	Yangon, Myanmar	Decision (Unanimous)	3	3:00
2019-02-11	Win	(Japan) Kyoji Bancho	KNOCK OUT 2019 WINTER	Tokyo, Japan	KO (Body Punch)	2	1:48
2018-12-15	Loss	(China) Sun Zhixiang	Kunlun Fight 79	Taiyuan, China	Decision (Unanimous)	3	3:00
2018-11-18	Loss	(Japan) Kaito	SHOOT BOXING S-cup 65 kg World Tournament 2018, Semi Final	Tokyo, Japan	TKO (Doctor Stoppage)	3	0:42
2018-11-18	Win	(Australia) Trent Girdham	SHOOT BOXING S-cup 65 kg World Tournament 2018, Quarter Final	Tokyo, Japan	Decision (Majority)	3	3:00
2018-10-08	Win	(Japan) Pan Ryuson	REBELS 58	Tokyo, Japan	Ext.R Decision (Unanimous)	4	3:00
2018-09-08	Draw	(Thailand) Tapruwan Hadesworkout	KNOCK OUT 2018 OSAKA 2nd	Osaka, Japan	Decision (Majority)	5	3:00
2018-08-03	Win	(Japan) UMA	REBELS 57	Tokyo, Japan	Decision (Split)	3	3:00
2018-06-24	Win	(Japan) Yuya	NJKF 2018 2nd	Tokyo, Japan	Decision (Unanimous)	5	3:00
2018-05-06	Loss	(China) Wei Ninghui	Kunlun Fight 73	Sanya, China	Decision (Split)	3	3:00
2018-04-14	Win	(Japan) Yosuke Mizuochi	KNOCK OUT Sakura Burst	Kawasaki, Japan	KO (Punch)	1	2:23
2018-03-11	Win	(China) Feng Lei	Kunlun Fight 70	Sanya, China	Decision (Split)	3	3:00
2018-02-12	Loss	(Japan) Fukashi	KNOCK OUT FIRST IMPACT, Super Lightweight Tournament Quarter Final	Tokyo, Japan	Decision (Majority)	5	3:00
2017-12-17	Draw	(Japan) Masataka Maeda	Japan Kickboxing Innovation Champions Carnival 2017 III	Tokyo, Japan	Decision (Split)	3	3:00
2017-11-22	Loss	(Japan) Kaito	SHOOT BOXING BATTLE SUMMIT-GROUND ZERO TOKYO 2017	Tokyo, Japan	Decision (Majority)	3	3:00
For the SHOOT BOXING Super Lightweight title.
2017-09-24	Win	(Thailand) Tepparith Sip Or Boon	NJKF 2017 3rd	Tokyo, Japan	Decision (Unanimous)	5	3:00
2017-08-27	Loss	(China) Yang Zhuo	Kunlun Fight 65 - Kunlun Fight 16 Man Tournament 66 kg-1/8 finals	Qingdao, China	Decision (Unanimous)	3	3:00
2017-07-15	Win	(China) Jia Aoqi	Kunlun Fight 64	Chongqing, China	KO (Right Hook)	2	1:45
2017-06-18	Win	(Japan) Shinji Aseishi	NJKF 2017 2nd	Tokyo, Japan	TKO	4	1:54
Defends WBC Muay Thai Japan Welterweight title.
2017-05-05	Win	(Japan) Ichiyo Morimoto	J-KICK 2017～J-NETWORK 20th Anniversary～2nd	Tokyo, Japan	Decision (Unanimous)	3	3:00
2017-04-01	Loss	(Thailand) Jaowehar Sirilakgym	KNOCK OUT vol.2	Kawasaki, Japan	TKO (Doctor Stoppage)	3	1:32
2017-02-12	Win	(Japan) Shinya Indo	KNOCK OUT vol.1	Tokyo, Japan	TKO (Doctor Stoppage)	5	1:50
2016-11-27	Loss	(Sweden) Samuel Bark	NJKF 2016 7th	Tokyo, Japan	Decision (Unanimous)	5	3:00
For the WBC Muay Thai International Welterweight title.
2016-09-17	Win	(Cambodia) Aron Gonzales	NJKF 2016 6th	Tokyo, Japan	Decision (Unanimous)	3	3:00
2016-08-07	Draw	(Japan) Hiroaki Suzuki	Kunlun Fight 49 x REBELS 45	Tokyo, Japan	Decision	3	3:00
2016-06-19	Win	(Thailand) Deppikart Nor.Kanbu	M-ONE 2016 vol.2	Tokyo, Japan	Decision (Unanimous)	3	3:00
2016-05-08	Win	(Japan) Yuya Yamato	NJKF 2016 2nd	Tokyo, Japan	Decision (Unanimous)	5	3:00
Wins WBC Muay Thai Japan Welterweight title.
2016-03-21	Win	(Thailand) Kongnapa Weerasakreck	M-ONE	Tokyo, Japan	Decision (Majority)	5	3:00
2016-02-21	Win	(Japan) Sasaya	NJKF 2016 1st	Tokyo, Japan	Decision (Unanimous)	3	3:00
2016-01-23	Win	(China) Ryo Wei		China	Decision	3	3:00
2015-12-19	Win	(Japan) Atsushi Tamefusa	MAT vol.1	Tokyo, Japan	Decision (Unanimous)	3	3:00
2015-11-15	Win	(Japan) Eiki	NJKF 2015 9th	Tokyo, Japan	KO (Right Hook)	1	2:55
2015-09-27	Win	(Thailand) Seisak Acegym	NJKF 2015 6th	Tokyo, Japan	TKO (Doctor Stoppage)	3	0:27
2015-07-24	Loss	(Brazil) Danilo Zanolini	RISE 106	Tokyo, Japan	Decision (Unanimous)	5	3:00
For the RISE Welterweight title.
2015-05-10	Loss	(Japan) Yuya Yamato	NJKF 2015 3rd	Tokyo, Japan	TKO (Doctor Stoppage)	5	1:55
Loses WBC Muay Thai Japan Welterweight title.
2015-03-22	Loss	(Thailand) Kaew Fairtex	WPMF JAPAN×REBELS SUK WEERASAKRECK FAIRTEX	Tokyo, Japan	Decision (Unanimous)	5	3:00
2015-02-11	Win	(Japan) Riki Matsuoka	NO KICK NO LIFE 2015	Tokyo, Japan	TKO (Doctor Stoppage)	4	2:41
2014-12-27	Win	(Brazil) Danilo Zanolini	Hoost Cup Forever	Nagoya, Japan	Ext.R Decision (Split)	4	3:00
2014-11-15	Win	(Japan) Eiki	NJKF 2014 8th	Tokyo, Japan	Decision (Unanimous)	3	3:00
2014-09-21	Win	(Japan) T-98	NJKF 2014 6th	Tokyo, Japan	Decision (Unanimous)	5	3:00
Wins WBC Muay Thai Japan Welterweight title.
2014-07-21	Win	(Japan) Sasaya	NJKF 2014 5th	Tokyo, Japan	Decision (Unanimous)	5	3:00
2014-04-13	Win	(Japan) DAI	NJKF 2014 3rd	Tokyo, Japan	KO (Right Elbow)	2	0:51
Wins NJKF Welterweight title.
2014-11-10	Win	(Japan) Keita Makihara	Krush 34	Tokyo, Japan	Decision (Unanimous)	3	3:00
2014-09-21	Win	(Japan) TaCa	Krush 33	Tokyo, Japan	Decision (Unanimous)	3	3:00
2013-07-15	Loss	(Japan) Masato Ootake	NJKF 2013 4th	Tokyo, Japan	Decision (Unanimous)	5	3:00
2013-06-09	Win	(Japan) UMA	TNK1 feat.REBELS	Takasaki, Japan	Decision (Unanimous)	3	3:00
2013-01-26	Win	(Japan) Yoshihiro Sato	Krush.26	Tokyo, Japan	Decision (Majority)	3	3:00
2012-11-25	Win	(Japan) Takeo Shiraga	NJKF KICK TO THE FUTURE 9	Tokyo, Japan	Decision (Unanimous)	5	3:00
Defends NJKF Super Welterweight title.
2012-09-22	Loss	(Japan) Soichiro Miyakoshi	NJKF KICK TO THE FUTURE 6	Tokyo, Japan	TKO (Doctor Stoppage)	3	1:22
For the WBC Muay Thai Japan Super Welterweight title.
2012-06-24	Win	(Japan) Tomo Kiire	NJKF KICK TO THE FUTURE 3	Tokyo, Japan	TKO (Towel thrown)	2	1:48
2012-03-17	Loss	(Japan) Yasuhiro Kido	Krush.17	Tokyo, Japan	KO (Spinning Back Fist)	2	1:28
Loses Krush −70kg title.
2012-02-18	Loss	(Japan) TOMOYUKI	NJKF KICK TO THE FUTURE 1	Tokyo, Japan	Decision (Majority)	3	3:00
2011-09-25	Loss	(Japan) Yuya Yamamoto	K-1 World MAX 2011 -70kg Japan Tournament Final, Semi Final	Osaka, Japan	Ext.R Decision (Unanimous)	4	3:00
2011-09-25	Win	(Japan) Yasuhiro Kido	K-1 World MAX 2011 -70kg Japan Tournament Final, Quarter Final	Osaka, Japan	Decision (Unanimous)	3	3:00
2011-07-16	Win	(Japan) Yutaro Yamauchi	Krush inaugural -70 kg Championship Tournament, Final	Tokyo, Japan	Decision (Majority)	3	3:00
Wins the Krush −70kg title.
2011-07-16	Win	(Japan) Hiroki Nakajima	Krush inaugural -70 kg Championship Tournament, Semi Final	Tokyo, Japan	Decision (Unanimous)	3	3:00
2011-05-29	Win	(Japan) Masakazu Watanabe	Krush inaugural -70 kg Championship Tournament, Quarter Final	Tokyo, Japan	Decision (Unanimous)	3	3:00
2011-01-09	Win	(Japan) Hidetora	Krush inaugural Championship Tournament Round.2	Tokyo, Japan	KO (Right High Kick)	2	2:23
2010-09-20	Win	(Japan) Masakazu Watanabe	Krush 10	Tokyo, Japan	Ext.R Decision (Majority)	4	3:00
2010-07-09	Loss	(Japan) Yuji Nashiro	Krush.8	Tokyo, Japan	Decision (Unainmous)	3	3:00
2010-05-09	Win	(Japan) Shomei Taiyou	NJKF	Tokyo, Japan	KO (Majority)	5	1:01
Wins NJKF Super Welterweight title.
2010-03-28	Win	(Japan) Takayoshi Kitayama	NJKF	Tokyo, Japan	Decision (Unanimous)	3	3:00
2009-11-28	Win	(Japan) Takashi Ono	NJKF ROAD TO REAL KING 14	Tokyo, Japan	Decision (Unanimous)	3	3:00
2009-09-23	Loss	(Japan) Tatsuji	NJKF ROAD TO REAL KING 11	Tokyo, Japan	Decision (Majority)	3	3:00
2009-05-10	Win	(Japan) Yutaro Yamauchi	NJKF ROAD TO REAL KING 6	Tokyo, Japan	Decision (Majority)	5	3:00
2009-03-22	Win	(Japan) Toshiya Kurenai	NJKF GO FOR BROKE ～ROAD TO REAL KING III	Tokyo, Japan	Decision (Unanimous)	5	3:00
2008-11-30	Draw	(Thailand) Israsak Siseksan	NJKF Muay Thai Open 6	Tokyo, Japan	Decision	5	3:00
2008-11-08	Loss	(France) Fabio Pinca	Janus Fight Night "Legend"	Padova, Italy	Decision (Unanimous)	5	3:00
2008-07-28	Loss	(Thailand) Ganswan BeWell	NJKF START OF NEW LEGEND IX	Tokyo, Japan	Decision (Unanimous)	5	3:00
2008-06-08	Loss	(Japan) Yuichiro Nagashima	NJKF "West Swell"	Osaka, Japan	Decision (Split)	5	3:00
2008-05-11	Win	(Japan) Shomei Furukawa	NJKF START OF NEW LEGEND III	Tokyo, Japan	Decision (Unanimous)	5	3:00
Wins vacant NJKF Welterweight title.
2008-03-08	Win	(Thailand) K Wor.Wanchai	NJKF START OF NEW LEGEND	Tokyo, Japan	KO (Left Hook)	4	2:09
2007-11-23	Win	(Japan) Tomohiro Goto	NJKF FIGHTING EVOLUTION XIII	Tokyo, Japan	KO (Body Punch)	3	1:26
2007-10-14	Win	(Japan) Kazuki Ozawa	NJKF FIGHTING EVOLUTION XII	Tokyo, Japan	TKO (Doctor Stoppage)	3	1:41
2007-09-02	Draw	(Japan) Jotaro Usui	NJKF FIGHTING EVOLUTION VIII	Tokyo, Japan	Decision	5	3:00
For the NJKF Welterweight title.
2007-07-01	Win	(Korea) Lee Taewon	NJKF FIGHTING EVOLUTION VIII	Tokyo, Japan	Decision (Unanimous)	5	3:00
2007-05-13	Win	(Japan) KEN	NJKF FIGHTING EVOLUTION VI	Tokyo, Japan	TKO (Left Cross)	1	2:27
2007-03-18	Win	(Japan) Takuro Moriya	NJKF FIGHTING EVOLUTION III	Tokyo, Japan	TKO	1	1:58
2007-01-14	Loss	(Japan) DJ Taiki	NJKF FIGHTING EVOLUTION I	Tokyo, Japan	Decision (Majority)	5	3:00
2006-11-23	Win	(Japan) Yasuo Morita	NJKF Advance X	Tokyo, Japan	KO	2	2:35
2006-10-15	Win	(Japan) Daisuke Kato	NJKF Advance IX	Tokyo, Japan	Decision (Unanimous)	3	3:00
2006-09-17	Win	(Japan) Kiryu Heineken	TRIAL LEAGUE.7	Tokyo, Japan	Decision (Unanimous)	3	3:00
2006-07-25	Win	(Japan) 飛本栽	J-NETWORK GO! GO! J-NET '06 ～STREETS of FIRE～	Tokyo, Japan	Decision (Unanimous)	3	3:00
2006-05-28	Loss	(Japan) Hinata	R.I.S.E. 26	Tokyo, Japan	KO (Punch)	3	2:17
2005-07-17	Win	(Japan) Ryota Yoshino	MA Nihon Kick DETERMINATION 6th	Japan	Decision (Majority)	3	3:00
2005-01-30	Draw	(Japan) Spartan Terayama	MA Nihon Kick "DETERMINATION 1st	Japan	Decision (Majority)	3	3:00
Legend: Win Loss Draw/No contest Notes
