= Jaroenchai Kesagym =

Muay Thai kickboxer

Jaroenchai
- Born: February 9, 1982 (age 44); Udon Thani Province, Thailand
- Other names: Jaroenchai Chor.Param6 (เจริญชัย ช.พระราม6); Jaroenchai Jor Rachadakon (เจริญชัย จ.รัชดากร); Jaroenchai Aoodonmuang (เจริญชัย อู๊ดดอนเมือง); Jaroenchai ExcidiconGym (เจริญชัย เอ็กซิดิคอลยิม); Jarunchai Liongym (ジャルンチャイ ・ライオンジム)
- Nationality: Thai
- Height: 1.68 m (5 ft 6 in)
- Weight: 61 kg (134 lb; 9.6 st)
- Style: Muay Thai
- Stance: Orthodox
- Fighting out of: Bangkok, Thailand
- Team: Kesa Gym (Thailand); Jocky Gym; Lion Gym (Japan)

Other information
- Occupation: Muay Thai trainer

Jaroenchai Kesagym (เจริญชัย เคซ่ายิม) is a Thai Muay Thai fighter.

== Biography and career ==
On August 22, 2005 Jaroenchai traveled to Japan to defend his Rajadamnern Stadium title at SNKA Titans 2nd. He defeated Hiroki Ishii by unanimous decision.

On August 21, 2010 Jaroenchai traveled to China to face Hiromasa Masuda for the interim WBC Muay Thai World Lightweight title. He won the fight by split decision.

In 2017 Jaroenchai came out of retirement to take a kickboxing fight on the DEEP Hachioji Chojin Matsuri card in Japan where he had been working as a trainer for multiple years. He beat Kohei Nishikawa by second round TKO. This win granted him the #9 spot on the Liverkick Featherweight world rankings.

== Titles and accomplishments ==
- World Muaythai Council
  - 2x WMC World Lightweight Champion (2006, 2008)
- World Boxing Council Muay Thai
  - 2010 WBC Muay Thai World Lightweight Champion
- Professional Boxing Association of Thailand (PAT)
  - 2005 Thailand Lightweight Champion (defended once)
- Rajadamnern Stadium
  - 2005 Rajadamnern Stadium Lightweight Champion (defended once)
  - 2009 Rajadamnern Stadium Lightweight Champion
- Omnoi Stadium
  - 2006 Omnoi Stadium Lightweight Champion

== Fight record ==
Professional Muaythai record
Date	Result	Opponent	Event	Location	Method	Round	Time
2021-12-12	Loss	(Japan) Naoki Tanaka	RISE 153	Tokyo, Japan	TKO (Punches)	3	0:46
2017-04-02	Win	(Japan) Kohei Nishikawa	DEEP Hachioji Chojin Matsuri	Hachiōji, Japan	TKO (Punches)	2	2:28
2011-02-28	Win	(Thailand) Saenchainoi Phumphanmuang	Rajadamnern Stadium	Bangkok, Thailand	Decision	5	3:00
2011-01-06	Loss	(Thailand) Jomthong Chuwattana	Daorungchujaroen, Rajadamnern Stadium	Bangkok, Thailand	Decision	5	3:00
2010-11-01	Win	(Thailand) Saksurin Kiatyongyut	Daorungchujaroen, Rajadamnern Stadium	Bangkok, Thailand	Decision	5	3:00
2010-08-21	Win	(Japan) Hiromasa Masuda		Haikou, China	Decision (Split)	5	3:00
Wins the interim WBC Muay Thai World Lightweight title.
2010-05-26	Win	(Thailand) Extra Sor.Rerkchai	Daorungchujaroen, Rajadamnern Stadium	Bangkok, Thailand	Decision	5	3:00
2010-03-22	Loss	(Thailand) Extra Sor.Rerkchai	Daorungchujaroen, Rajadamnern Stadium	Bangkok, Thailand	Decision	5	3:00
For the vacant WMC World Lightweight title.
2010-02-18	Win	(Thailand) Sagatpetch IngramGym	Daorungchujaroen, Rajadamnern Stadium	Bangkok, Thailand	Decision	5	3:00
2009-07-02	Loss	(Thailand) Samsamut Kaitchongkhao	Daorungchujaroen, Rajadamnern Stadium	Bangkok, Thailand	Decision	5	3:00
2009-01-19	Loss	(Thailand) Nuathoranee Sitniwat	Daorungchujaroen, Rajadamnern Stadium	Bangkok, Thailand	Decision	5	3:00
2008-12-22	Loss	(Thailand) Puja Sor.Suwanee	Daorungchujaroen, Rajadamnern Stadium	Bangkok, Thailand	Decision	5	3:00
2008-11-26	Win	(Thailand) Vinailek Por.Rangsan	Daorungchujaroen, Rajadamnern Stadium	Bangkok, Thailand	Decision	5	3:00
Wins the vacant WMC World Lightweight title.
2008-10-30	Loss	(Thailand) Vinailek Por.Rangsan	Daorungchujaroen, Rajadamnern Stadium	Bangkok, Thailand	Decision	5	3:00
2008-09-01	Loss	(Thailand) Petchasawin Seantransferry	Rajadamnern Stadium	Bangkok, Thailand	KO	4	
Loses Thailand Lightweight title.
2008-07-03	Loss	(Thailand) Singmanee Kaewsamrit	Daorungchujarern, Rajadamnern Stadium	Bangkok, Thailand	Decision	5	3:00
2008-05-22	Win	(Thailand) Nongbee Kiatyongyut	Kiatyongyut, Rajadamnern Stadium	Bangkok, Thailand	Decision	5	3:00
2008-04-24	Win	(Thailand) Ikkyusang Kor.Rungthanakiat	Jarumueang, Rajadamnern Stadium	Bangkok, Thailand	KO	3	
2008-04-03	Win	(Thailand) Chalermkiat Sor Chokkitchai	Daorungchujaroen, Rajadamnern Stadium	Bangkok, Thailand	Decision	5	3:00
Wins the vacant WMC World Lightweight (135 lbs) title and defends Thailand Lightweight title.
?	Win	(Thailand) Fasura Wor Petchpun	Rajadamnern Stadium	Bangkok, Thailand	KO (Left Hook)	3	
2007-04-24	Win	(Thailand) Iquezang Kor.Rungthanakeat	Rajadamnern Stadium	Bangkok, Thailand	Decision	5	33:00
Denfends WMC World Lightweight (135 lbs) title.
2007-08-02	Loss	(Thailand) Jomthong Chuwattana	Rajadamnern Stadium	Bangkok, Thailand	Decision	5	3:00
2007-05-03	Loss	(Thailand) Lerdsila Chumpairtour	Daorungchujaroen, Rajadamnern Stadium	Bangkok, Thailand	Decision	5	3:00
2007-03-15	Loss	(Thailand) Saenchai Sor.Kingstar	Chujaroen, Rajadamnern Stadium	Bangkok, Thailand	KO (body kick)	3	
2007-01-25	Win	(Thailand) Wuttichai Sor.Yupinda	Rajadamnern Stadium	Bangkok, Thailand	KO	2	
2006-12-21	Win	(Thailand) Saiyoknoi Sakchainarong	Chujaroen + Jarumueang, Rajadamnern Stadium	Bangkok, Thailand	Decision	5	3:00
2006-11-12	Win	(Japan) Satoshi Kobayashi	AJKF Solid Fist	Tokyo, Japan	Decision (Unanimous)	5	3:00
2006-09-28	Win	(Thailand) Numphon P.K.Stereo	Jarumueang, Rajadamnern Stadium	Bangkok, Thailand	KO	4	
Wins the vacant WMC World Lightweight (135 lbs) title.
2006-08-23	Loss	(Thailand) Lerdsila Chumpairtour	Jarumueang, Rajadamnern Stadium	Bangkok, Thailand	Decision	5	3:00
2006-07-24	Win	(Thailand) Nuaphet Sakhomsil	Daorungchujarean, Rajadamnern Stadium	Bangkok, Thailand	Decision	5	3:00
2006-06-29	Loss	(Thailand) Samranchai 96Peenang	Jarumueang, Rajadamnern Stadium	Bangkok, Thailand	Decision	5	3:00
2006-05-03	Win	(Thailand) Khunsuk Phetsupaphan	Daorungchujarean, Rajadamnern Stadium	Bangkok, Thailand	Decision	5	3:00
2006-03-20	Win	(Thailand) Khunsuk Phetsupaphan	Daorungchujarean, Rajadamnern Stadium	Bangkok, Thailand	Decision	5	3:00
2006-02-09	Win	(Thailand) Phetnamek Sor.Srisawat	Daorungchujarean, Rajadamnern Stadium	Bangkok, Thailand	Decision	5	3:00
2005-12-29	Win	(Thailand) Noppakao Tor.Pansit	Jarumueang, Rajadamnern Stadium	Bangkok, Thailand	Decision	5	3:00
2005-11-23	Win	(Thailand) Noppakao Tor.Pansit	Daorungchujaroen, Rajadamnern Stadium	Bangkok, Thailand	Decision	5	3:00
Wins the Thailand Lightweight (135 lbs) title.
2005-10-10	Win	(Thailand) Denlangu Tor.Samakhom	Rajadamnern Stadium	Bangkok, Thailand	Decision	5	3:00
2005-08-22	Win	(Japan) Hiroki Ishii	SNKA "Titans 2nd"	Tokyo, Japan	Decision (Unanimous)	5	3:00
Defends Rajadamnern Stadium Lightweight (135lbs) title.
2005-06-13	Win	(Thailand) Noppakao Sor Wanchat	Daorungchujaroen, Rajadamnern Stadium	Bangkok, Thailand	Decision	5	3:00
2005-05-12	Loss	(Thailand) Lakhin Sor Saraithong	Daorungchujaroen, Rajadamnern Stadium	Bangkok, Thailand	KO		
For the vacant WMC World 140 lbs title.
2005-03-03	Win	(Thailand) Sornkom Jocky Gym	Daorungchujaroen, Rajadamnern Stadium	Bangkok, Thailand	Decision	5	3:00
Wins the Rajadamnern Stadium Lightweight (135 lbs) title.
2005-01-06	Win	(Thailand) Sornkom Jocky Gym	Daorungchujaroen, Rajadamnern Stadium	Bangkok, Thailand	Decision	5	3:00
2004-12-13	Win	(Thailand) Denthasai Kiatwipat	Daorungchujaroen, Rajadamnern Stadium	Bangkok, Thailand	Decision	5	3:00
2004-10-27	Loss	(Thailand) Denthasai Kiatwipat	Daorungchujaroen, Rajadamnern Stadium	Bangkok, Thailand	Decision	5	3:00
2004-09-30	Win	(Thailand) Tapluang Bor Chor Ror.2	Daorungchujaroen, Rajadamnern Stadium	Bangkok, Thailand	Decision	5	3:00
2004-09-01	Loss	(Thailand) Klangsuan SasiprapaGym	Jarumueang, Rajadamnern Stadium	Bangkok, Thailand	Decision	5	3:00
2004-07-28	Win	(Thailand) Attaphon Por.Samranchai	Daorungchujaroen + Jarumueang, Rajadamnern Stadium	Bangkok, Thailand	Decision	5	3:00
2004-05-31	Loss	(Thailand) Sornkom Jocky Gym	Daorungchujaroen + Jarumueang, Rajadamnern Stadium	Bangkok, Thailand	Decision	5	3:00
2004-02-23	Loss	(Thailand) Jomtap Mahasarakham	Daorungchujaroen + Jarumueang, Rajadamnern Stadium	Bangkok, Thailand	Decision	5	3:00
2004-01-01	Loss	(Thailand) Khumsap Kiatnakhonchon	Daorungchujaroen + Jarumueang, Rajadamnern Stadium	Bangkok, Thailand	Decision	5	3:00
2003-12-11	Loss	(Thailand) Thirachai Muangsurin	Daorungchujaroen, Rajadamnern Stadium	Bangkok, Thailand	Decision	5	3:00
2003-11-03	Loss	(Thailand) Srisawat Sakmuang Klaeng	Daorungchujaroen + Jarumueang, Rajadamnern Stadium	Bangkok, Thailand	Decision	5	3:00
2003-09-29	Win	(Thailand) Jomtap Mahasarakham	Daorungchujaroen + Jarumueang, Rajadamnern Stadium	Bangkok, Thailand	Decision	5	3:00
2003-08-27	Win	(Thailand) Chekbil Tharmachat	Daorungchujaroen + Jarumueang, Rajadamnern Stadium	Bangkok, Thailand	Decision	5	3:00
Legend: Win Loss Draw/No contest Notes

== See also ==
- List of male kickboxers
