= Taiju Shiratori =

Japanese kickboxer (born 1996)

- Born: February 2, 1996 (age 30); Tokyo, Japan
- Other names: The Prince
- Height: 180 cm (5 ft 11 in)
- Weight: 65 kg (143.3 lb; 10.2 st)
- Division: Bantamweight (Kickboxing); Lightweight (Boxing)
- Style: Kyokushin Karate, Muay Thai, Kickboxing
- Stance: Southpaw
- Fighting out of: Tokyo, Japan
- Team: Team Teppen (Teppen Gym)
- Trainer: Hiroyuki Nasukawa (Teppen Gym president)
- Years active: 2011 - present

Professional boxing record
- Total: 11
- Wins: 8
- By knockout: 5
- Losses: 3
- By knockout: 2

Kickboxing record
- Total: 48
- Wins: 32
- By knockout: 13
- Losses: 14
- By knockout: 7
- Draws: 1
- No contests: 1

Other information
- Boxing record from BoxRec

Taiju Shiratori (白鳥大珠, Shiratori Taiju; born February 2, 1996) is a Japanese professional muay thai kickboxer and former boxer. A professional competitor since 2011, Shiratori began his career as a muay thai fighter, most notably winning the WPMF Japan title in 2013. as well as the 2021 Rizin KICK tournament winner. He is the reigning ISKA Unified rules World Light welterweight Champion.

Between July and November 2021 he was the #4 ranked bantamweight in the world according to Combat Press. Combat Press ranks him as the #5 super bantamweight kickboxer in the world. Shiratori was ranked as a top ten bantamweight by Combat Press between August 2019 and August 2020, peaking at #1 between April and August 2020. Combat Press furthermore ranked him as a top ten super bantamweight between September 2020 and March 2021, peaking at #1 in September and November 2020.

== Muay thai career ==
=== Early career ===
Shiratori made his professional debut against Shogun at Muay Lok 2011 -1st- on February 20, 2011. He lost the fight by unanimous decision. His next two fights were likewise with Muay Lok, during which he defeated Piero Otsuka by unanimous decision at Muay Lok 2011 -2nd- on April 2, 2011, and Rukiya Anpo by unanimous decision at Muay Lok 2011 -3rd- on August 7, 2011.

Shiratori made his kickboxing rules debut against Takuya Saito at J-NETWORK J-FIGHT in SHINJUKU -vol.24- on February 19, 2012. Saito won the fight by knockout, stopping Shiratori with just 10 seconds left in the fight.

=== 2012 Next Heroes Cup ===
Following his loss to Saito, Shiratori returned to muay thai. He was scheduled to fight Fumiya Iwashita at M-1 Muay Thai Challenge Sutt Yod Muaythai vol.1 Part 1 on March 25, 2012, in the semifinals of the 2012 Next Heroes Cup. Shiroatori notched his first stoppage victory, winning by a first-round technical knockout. Shiratori was next scheduled to face Yuta Tokuyama at Muay Lok 2012 -2nd- on June 17, 2012. Shiratori won the fight by a 35-second knockout. Shiratori faced Daichi Kurashina at REBELS 12 on July 29, 2012, in the finals of the 2012 Next Heroes Cup. He won the fight by unanimous decision, managing to knock Kurashina with a headkick in the third round, with scores of 29–27, 30-26 and 30–26.

Shiratori was scheduled to fight Takuro at Muay Lok 2012 -3rd- on October 10, 2021. Takuro snapped Shiratori's three fight winning streak with a second-round technical knockout.

Shiratori faced Em Rajasaklek at Muay Lok 2013 -ist- on April 28, 2013. The fight was ruled a draw, with one judge scoring the bout 30-29 for Shiratori, while the remaining two judges scored it 29-29.

After defeating Klasik Sitchansing by a first-round knockout in the fabled Lumpinee Stadium on August 10, 2013, Shiratori was scheduled to fight a rematch with Takuro at M-FIGHT The Battle of Muaythai II on August 9, 2013. The rematch went into an extra round, as the bout was ruled a draw following the first three rounds, after which Shiratori won by majority decision.

=== WPMF Super Featherweight champion ===
This two-fight winning streak earned Shiratori the chance to fight Takahito Fujimaki for the WPMF Japan Super Featherweight title at M-FIGHT The Battle of Muaythai III on December 1, 2013. Shiratori beat Fujimaki by unanimous decision.

Shiratori was scheduled to fight Seo Dong Pong at Muay Lok 2014 -1st- on April 27, 2014, in a non-title bout. Pong won the fight by a third-round technical knockout, dropping Shiratori three times inside of the first 48 seconds of the third round. Three months later, Shiratori was scheduled to fight another non-title bout against Tsuyoshi M16 Muaythaistyle at Muay Lok 2014 -2nd- on July 13, 2014. Tsuyoshi won the fight by a fourth-round technical knockout, after the ringside doctor stopped the fight due to a cut caused by an elbow.

== Boxing career ==
Shiratori made his boxing debut against Nao Sugawara on May 6, 2015. He won the fight by knockout. Shiratori would go on to win eight of his next ten boxing matches, before challenging Izuki Tomioka for the Japanese Youth Lightweight. Tomioka successfully defended the title by unanimous decision.

== Kickboxing career ==
=== Early RISE career ===
Shiratori transitioned to kickboxing in 2018, and signed with RISE. He was scheduled to make his promotional debut against Kazuma at RISE 125, on June 17, 2018. He won the fight by a first-round knockout, dropping Kazuma with a left straight at the very end of the round.

Shiratori was scheduled to face Masanori Shimada at RISE 127 on September 16, 2018. He won the fight by a first-round headkick knockout.

Shiratori faced Tomohiro Kitai at RISE 129 on November 17, 2018. Shiratori dominated the bout, scoring a single knockdown with a right straight in the second round. He won the fight by unanimous decision, with all three judges scoring the fight 30–26 in his favor.

Shiratori made his Rizin debut at Rizin - Heisei's Last Yarennoka! on December 31, 2018, when he faced Yoshiya Uzatsuyo. Shiratori won the fight by a third-round stoppage, knocking Uzatsuyo out with a well timed knee midway through the round.

=== RISE Lightweight champion ===
==== Shiratori vs. Hideki ====
His four fight winning streak earned Shiratori the right to fight Hideki for the vacant RISE Lightweight title, in the main event of RISE 130 on February 3, 2019. At the time that the bout was scheduled, Hideki was the #1 ranked contender in RISE lightweight rankings, while Shiratori was the #2 ranked contender. It was further announced that the newly crowned champion would be given a place in the 2019 RISE World Series.

Shiratori won the fight by a third-round technical knockout. Both fighters started out cautiously, spending the first two rounds exchanging low kicks and occasional jabs, with the rounds being scored as a draw. Midway through the third round, both fighters exchanged kicks, which resulted in cuts on the legs both. Shiratori suffered a slight cut on his knee, while Hideki suffered a deeper cut on his shin. Due to the depth of the cut, the ringside doctor opted to stop the fight. Shiratori was unsatisfied with how the fight ended, stating he would fight Hideki in his first title defense.

==== RISE World Series ====
Shiratori was scheduled to fight Hector Santiago in the first round of the 2019 RISE World Series on March 10, 2019. Prior to the beginning of the tournament, Shiratori stated his desire to fight Taiga Kawabe in the tournament semifinals. Shiratori utilized his length to keep Santiago at bay through the first half of the fight, while Santiago managed to push into the pocked and land with more frequency in the second half of the fight. They went into an extra extension round, as the fight was ruled a draw following the first three, after which Shiratori won by unanimous decision.

Shiratori was scheduled to fight Hiroto Yamaguchi at Rizin FF 16 on June 2, 2019. He won the fight by unanimous decision.

Shiratori faced Saeksan Or. Kwanmuang in the semifinals of the 2019 RISE World Series on July 21, 2019. The two-time Rajadamnern Stadium lightweight champion advanced to the tournament semifinals after defeating Taiga Kawabe by unanimous decision. Shiratori completely dominated Saeksan, knocking him down in both the second and third round. He won by a wide unanimous decision, with scores of 30–26, 30-25 and 30–25.

Advancing to the tournament finals, Shiratori faced Genji Umeno on September 16, 2019. He knocked Umeno out with a left straight at the very end of the first round.

==== Taiga duology ====
Although he wasn't able to fight Taiga Kawabe during the RISE World Series, Shiratori was scheduled to fight the former K-1 Featherweight champion at Rizin 19 on October 12, 2019. Shitari came into the bout riding a nine-fight winning streak, while Taiga came into the bout with only a single win in past seven fights. Shiratori knocked Taiga down in both the first and second rounds, while Taiga managed to mount a comeback in the third round. Despite this, Shiratori won the fight by unanimous decision.

They were scheduled to fight a rematch at Rizin 20 - Saitama on December 31, 2019. Shiratori won the fight by a second-round technical knockout. During the second round, Shiratori cut Taiga's face with a knee strike, which forced the ringside doctor to stop the fight in-between the rounds.

On July 21, 2020, Shiratori faced Sho Ogawa at Rise on Abema. He won the fight by an extra round unanimous decision. It was his last fight as the reigning champion, as he vacated the RISE Lightweight championship on August 1, 2020.

=== The losing skid ===
Shiratori participated in the 2020 RISE Dead of Alive 63 kg four man tournament, with the other three participants being Renta Nishioka, Naoki Tanaka and Kento Haraguchi. He was scheduled to fight Naoki Tanaka in the semifinals on October 11, 2020. Despite coming into the fight as a favorite, Shiratori would lose by a first-round technical knockout. Tanaka landed a knee to the forehead of Shiratori midway through the round, resulting in a cut which left Shiratori unable to continue. It was only the second kickboxing loss of his career.

Shiratori was scheduled to fight Kento Haraguchi at RISE Eldorado 2021 on February 28, 2021. He accepted the fight 24 days before the event, as a short notice replacement for Petpanomrung Kiatmuu9, who was unable to enter Japan due to the COVID-19 restrictions. After an even first round, Haraguchi knocked Shiratori down twice in the second round. The first knockdown came as a result of a spinning hook kick, while the second knockdown was a result of a head kick. Haraguchi won the fight by unanimous decision.

=== Rizin KICK tournament ===
Shiratori took part in the 2021 Rizin KICK tournament, held during the Rizin 29 – Osaka event on June 27, 2021. He was scheduled to fight Ryo Takahashi in the semifinals, while the other semifinal bout was contested by Koji and Genji Umeno. The event was originally scheduled for May 23, before being postponed due to the COVID-19 restrictions. Shiratori made quick work of Takahashi, knocking him down twice in the first round, with the referee stopping the fight following the second knockdown.

Advancing to the tournament finals, Shiratori met Koji. He won the fight by unanimous decision, with two of the judges scoring the fight 30-27 for him, while the third judge scored it 30–25 in his favor. Aside from winning the tournament title, Shiratori was also given ¥5,000,000 in prize money. During the post-fight interview, Shiratori stated his desire to fight Tenshin Nasukawa.

=== Return to RISE ===
Shiratori was scheduled to fight a rematch with Naoki Tanaka at RISE WORLD SERIES 2021 Yokohama on September 23, 2021. The two previously fought in the semifinals of the 2020 Rise Dead or Alive tournament, which Tanaka won by a first-round technical knockout. Shiratori lost the rematch by unanimous decision. He had a strong start to the fight, but flagged as the it went on, with the judges ruling the bout a draw after the first three rounds. Accordingly, an extra round was fought, which Shiratori lost on all three of the judges scorecards.

Shiratori was booked to face the three-time RISE lightweight title challenger Hideki at RISE El Dorado 2022 April 2, 2022. The bout was a rematch of their February 3, 2019 fight, which Shiratori won by a third-round technical knockout. Shiratori won the rematch by extra round unanimous decision.

Shiratori faced the one-time Krush Lightweight and K-1 World GP Lightweight Champion Kongnapa Weerasakreck at The Match 2022 on June 19, 2022. He lost the fight by a first-round knockout. Shiratori was knocked down with a right hook at the 2:42 minute mark of the opening round, and although he was able to beat the eight-count, the referee nonetheless decided to wave the bout off.

==== Move to super lightweight ====
Shiratori faced the tenth ranked RISE lightweight YA-MAN in a super lightweight (-65 kg) bout at RISE World Series 2022 on October 15, 2022. At the pre-fight press conference, Shiratori said he planned to fight at super lightweight from that point on. Shiratori won the fight by unanimous decision, with all three judges scoring the bout 29–28 in his favor. He knocked YA-MAN down with a high knee in the second round, which proved to be the deciding factor on the scorecards.

Shiratori was expected to face the Glory veteran Abdellah Ezbiri at RISE WORLD SERIES / SHOOTBOXING-KINGS on December 25, 2022. Ezbiri withdrew from the fight on December 22, and was replaced by Ilias Banniss. Shiratori won the fight by unanimous decision, with two scorecards of 30–27 and one scorecard of 30–28.

Shiratori faced the former two-weight Krush champion Daizo Sasaki at RISE EL DORADO 2023 on March 26, 2023. He won the fight by unanimous decision, with all three judges awarding him a 30–28 scorecard.

Shiratori faced the FFKMDA and WAKO France champion Alexis Sautron at MTGP Impact in Paris on June 24, 2023. He lost the fight by a second-round knockout. RISE later appealed the result with ISKA, claiming the stoppage occurred after the round had already ended. Their appeal was approved by the regulatory body on August 2, 2023, who overturned the result to a no-contest.

Shiratori faced Zakaria Zouggary at RISE WORLD SERIES 2023 Final Round on December 16, 2023. He won the fight by a third-round knockout.

Shiratori faced former RISE Middleweight champion Lee Sung-hyun at RISE ELDORADO 2024 on March 17, 2024. He lost the fight by majority decision.

Shiratori faced Petru Morari at RISE WORLD SERIES 2024 OSAKA on June 15, 2024. He won the fight by unanimous decision, with three scorecards of 30–28 in his favor.

Shiratori faced Faphayap Grabs at RISE WORLD SERIES 2024 YOKOHAMA on September 8, 2024. He won the fight by a first-round knockout.

Shiratori faced Petpanomrung Kiatmuu9 in the quarterfinals of the GLORY RISE Featherweight Grand Prix, held on December 21, 2024, in Chiba, Japan. He lost the fight by unanimous decision, with scores of 30–29, 30–28 and 30–27.

Shiratori faced Yutaro Asahi for the vacant RISE Super Lightweight (-65kg) title at RISE ELDORADO 2025 on March 29, 2025. RISE CEO Takashi Ito furthermore revealed that the winner would earn a place in the RISE GLORY Last Featherweight Standing tournament, expected to take in June of the same year. Although he was knocked down in the second round, Shiratori was able to win the fight by majority decision, with scores of 48—47, 48—47 and 47—47.

Shiratori faced the ISKA Freestyle Rules World Welterweight champion Andy Turland at RISE WORLD SERIES 2025 Tokyo on August 2, 2025. He won the fight by a first-round knockout.

== Outside the ring ==
He joined SASUKE 34 at 8 October 2017.He has given number 76. He failed Stage 1 at Rolling Hill.

He joined SASUKE 38 at 29 December 2020.He has given number 91. He failed Stage 1 at Fish Bone.

He joined SASUKE 39 at 28 December 2021.He has given number 84. He failed Stage 1 at Rolling Hill.

== Titles and accomplishments ==
=== Kickboxing ===
- RISE
  - 2019 RISE World Series -61 kg Tournament Champion
  - 2019 RISE Lightweight (-63kg) Champion
  - 2025 RISE Super Lightweight (-65kg) Champion
  - 2025 RISE "Fight of the Year" vs. Yutaro Asahi
- Rizin Fighting Federation
  - 2021 Rizin KICK Tournament Winner
- International Sport Kickboxing Association
  - 2026 ISKA Unified rules World Light welterweight (-65 kg) Champion

=== Muay Thai ===
- World Professional Muaythai Federation
  - 2013 WPMF Japan Super Featherweight Champion

=== Amateur ===
- RISE
  - 2009 KAMINARIMON -50 kg Tournament Winner
- Shin Karate
  - 2010 All Japan Shin Karate K-3 Grand Prix Winner

== Fight record ==
Kickboxing record
32 Wins (13 (T)KO's), 14 Losses, 1 Draw, 1 No Contest
Date	Result	Opponent	Event	Location	Method	Round	Time
2026-12-02		(Japan) Shota Tezuka	ONE Samurai 6	Yokohama, Japan			
2026-09-19	Loss	(Japan) Yura	RISE World Series 2026 Tokyo 2	Tokyo, Japan	KO (Punches)	4	0:47
Loses the RISE Super Lightweight (-65kg) title.
2026-05-28	Win	(France) Anthony Velay	Kickboxing Fes. GOAT 2	Tokyo, Japan	Decision (Unanimous)	3	3:00
Wins the vacant ISKA Unified rules World Light welterweight (-65kg) title.
2026-03-28	Loss	(Thailand) Capitan Petchyindee Academy	RISE ELDORADO 2026	Tokyo, Japan	Tech. Decision (Majority)	4	0:28
2025-11-02	Loss	(Japan) Hiroki Kasahara	RISE World Series 2025 Final - Last Featherweight Standing Second Round	Tokyo, Japan	Ext.R Decision (Unanimous)	4	3:00
2025-08-02	Win	(United Kingdom) Andy Turland	RISE WORLD SERIES 2025 Tokyo	Tokyo, Japan	KO (Body kick)	1	1:53
2025-03-29	Win	(Japan) Yutaro Asahi	RISE ELDORADO 2025	Tokyo, Japan	Decision (Majority)	5	3:00
Wins the vacant RISE Super Lightweight (-65kg) title.
2024-12-21	Loss	(Thailand) Petpanomrung Kiatmuu9	GLORY RISE Featherweight Grand Prix, Quarterfinals	Chiba, Japan	Decision (Unanimous)	3	3:00
2024-09-08	Win	(Thailand) Faphayap Grabs	RISE WORLD SERIES 2024 YOKOHAMA	Yokohama, Japan	KO (Knee to the body)	1	1:43
2024-06-15	Win	(Moldova) Petru Morari	RISE WORLD SERIES 2024 OSAKA	Osaka, Japan	Decision (Unanimous)	3	3:00
2024-03-17	Loss	(South Korea) Lee Sung-hyun	RISE ELDORADO 2024	Tokyo, Japan	Decision (Majority)	3	3:00
2023-12-16	Win	(Morocco) Zakaria Zouggary	RISE World Series 2023 - Final Round	Tokyo, Japan	KO (Knee to the head)	3	1:27
2023-06-24	NC	(France) Alexis Sautron	MTGP Impact in Paris	Paris, France	No Contest (overturned)	2	3:00
Originally a KO loss for Shiratori. The result was overturned as the stoppage occurred after the round had already ended.
2023-03-26	Win	(Japan) Daizo Sasaki	RISE ELDORADO 2023	Tokyo, Japan	Decision (Unanimous)	3	3:00
2022-12-25	Win	(Morocco) Ilias Banniss	RISE WORLD SERIES / Glory Rivals 4	Tokyo, Japan	Decision (Unanimous)	3	3:00
2022-10-15	Win	(Japan) YA-MAN	RISE WORLD SERIES 2022	Tokyo, Japan	Decision (Unanimous)	3	3:00
2022-06-19	Loss	(Thailand) Kongnapa Weerasakreck	THE MATCH 2022	Tokyo, Japan	KO (Right hook)	1	2:42
2022-04-02	Win	(Japan) Hideki	RISE ELDORADO 2022	Tokyo, Japan	Ext. R. Decision (Unanimous)	4	3:00
2021-09-23	Loss	(Japan) Naoki Tanaka	RISE WORLD SERIES 2021 Yokohama	Yokohama, Japan	Ext. R. Decision (Unanimous)	4	3:00
2021-06-27	Win	(Japan) Kouzi	Rizin 29 – Osaka, Tournament Final	Osaka, Japan	Decision (Unanimous)	3	3:00
Wins the RIZIN Bantamweight (-61 kg) Tournament title.
2021-06-27	Win	(Japan) Ryo Takahashi	Rizin 29 – Osaka, Tournament Semifinal	Osaka, Japan	TKO (Punches)	1	1:37
2021-02-28	Loss	(Japan) Kento Haraguchi	RISE Eldorado 2021	Yokohama, Japan	Decision (Unanimous)	3	3:00
2020-10-11	Loss	(Japan) Naoki Tanaka	RISE DEAD OR ALIVE 2020 Yokohama, Semi Final	Yokohama, Japan	TKO (Doctor stoppage/cut)	1	1:30
2020-07-21	Win	(Japan) Sho Ogawa	Rise on Abema	Tokyo, Japan	Ext.R Decision (Unanimous)	4	3:00
2019-12-31	Win	(Japan) Taiga	Rizin 20 - Saitama	Saitama, Japan	TKO (Doctor Stoppage/cut)	2	3:00
2019-10-12	Win	(Japan) Taiga	Rizin 19 - Osaka	Osaka, Japan	Decision (Unanimous)	3	3:00
2019-09-16	Win	(Japan) Genji Umeno	Rise World Series 2019 Final, -61 kg Tournament final	Chiba (city), Japan	KO (Straight Left)	1	2:59
Wins the RISE World Series -61kg Tournament title.
2019-07-21	Win	(Thailand) Saeksan Or. Kwanmuang	Rise World Series 2019 : Semi Finals, -61 kg Tournament Semi final	Osaka, Japan	Decision (Unanimous)	3	3:00
2019-06-02	Win	(Japan) Hiroto Yamaguchi	Rizin FF 16	Kobe, Japan	Decision (Unanimous)	3	3:00
2019-03-10	Win	(Brazil) Hector Santiago	RISE World Series 2019: First Round, -61 kg Tournament Quarter Final	Tokyo, Japan	Ext.R Decision (Unanimous)	4	3:00
2019-02-03	Win	(Japan) Hideki	RISE 130	Tokyo, Japan	TKO (Doctor Stoppage)	3	1:41
Wins the RISE Lightweight title.
2018-12-31	Win	(Japan) Yoshiya Uzatsuyo	Rizin - Heisei's Last Yarennoka!	Tokyo, Japan	KO (Right knee)	3	1:43
2018-11-17	Win	(Japan) Tomohiro Kitai	RISE 129	Tokyo, Japan	Decision	3	3:00
2018-09-16	Win	(Japan) Masanori Shimada	RISE 127	Tokyo, Japan	KO (Left high kick)	1	1:38
2018-06-17	Win	(Japan) Kazuma	RISE 125	Tokyo, Japan	KO (Straight Left)	1	2:59
2014-07-13	Loss	(Japan) Tsuyoshi M16 Muaythaistyle	Muay Lok 2014 -2nd-	Tokyo, Japan	TKO (Doctor Stoppage/Elbow)	4	2:23
2014-04-27	Loss	(Korea) Seo Dong Pong	Muay Lok 2014 -1st-	Tokyo, Japan	TKO (Three knockdowns)	3	0:48
2013-12-01	Win	(Japan) Takahito Fujimaki	M-FIGHT The Battle of Muaythai III	Yokohama, Japan	Decision (Unanimous)	5	3:00
Wins WPMF Japan Super Featherweight title.
2013-09-08	Win	(Japan) Takuro	M-FIGHT The Battle of Muaythai II	Tokyo, Japan	Ext.R Decision (Majority)	4	3:00
2013-08-10	Win	(Thailand) Klasik Sitchansing	Lumpinee Stadium	Bangkok, Thailand	KO	1	
2013-04-28	Draw	(Thailand) Em Rajasaklek	Muay Lok 2013 -ist-	Tokyo, Japan	Decision	3	3:00
2012-10-21	Loss	(Japan) Takuro	Muay Lok 2012 -3rd-	Tokyo, Japan	TKO	2	0:21
2012-07-29	Win	(Japan) Daichi Kurashina	REBELS.12, Tournament Final	Tokyo, Japan	Decision (Unanimous)	3	3:00
Wins the Next Heroes Cup.
2012-06-17	Win	(Japan) Yuta Tokuyama	Muay Lok 2012 -2nd-	Tokyo, Japan	KO (Left High Kick)	1	0:35
2012-03-25	Win	(Japan) Fumiya Iwashita	M-1 Muay Thai Challenge Sutt Yod Muaythai vol.1 Part 1, Tournament Semifinal	Tokyo, Japan	TKO	1	3:00
2012-02-19	Loss	(Japan) Takuya Saito	J-NETWORK J-FIGHT in SHINJUKU -vol.24-	Tokyo, Japan	KO	3	2:50
2011-08-07	Win	(Japan) Rukiya Anpo	Muay Lok 2011 -3rd-	Tokyo, Japan	Decision (Unanimous)	3	3:00
2011-04-02	Win	(Japan) Piero Otsuka	Muay Lok 2011 -2nd-	Tokyo, Japan	Decision (Unanimous)	3	3:00
2011-02-20	Loss	(Japan) Shogun	Muay Lok 2011 -1st-	Tokyo, Japan	Decision (Unanimous)	3	3:00
Legend: Win Loss Draw/No contest Notes

Amateur Kickboxing record
Date	Result	Opponent	Event	Location	Method	Round	Time
2010-07-11	Win	(Japan) Kaiji Togura	J-NETWORK J-GROW 34	Tokyo, Japan	KO	1	0:56
2009-11-29	Loss	(Japan) Shogo Kondo	KAMINARIMON	Tokyo, Japan	Decision		
For the KAMINARIMON -50kg title.
2009-10-25	Win	(Japan) Shinichiro Fukuda	KAMINARIMON, Final	Tokyo, Japan	Decision (Unanimous)	1	2:00
2009-10-25	Win	(Japan) Tokio Yachuda	KAMINARIMON, Semi Final	Tokyo, Japan	Decision (Unanimous)	1	1:00
Legend: Win Loss Draw/No contest Notes

== Professional boxing record ==
Key to abbreviations used for results
DQ	Disqualification	RTD	Corner retirement
KO	Knockout	SD	Split decision / split draw
MD	Majority decision / majority draw	TD	Technical decision / technical draw
NC	No contest	TKO	Technical knockout
PTS	Points decision	UD	Unanimous decision / unanimous draw

Boxing record
No.	Result	Record	Opponent	Type	Round(s)	Time	Date	Location	Notes
11	Loss	8–3	(Japan) Izuki Tomioka	UD	8 (8),		11 November 2017	Korakuen Hall, Tokyo, Japan	For Japanese Youth lightweight Title
10	Win	8–2	(Philippines) Prell Tupas	TKO	7 (8),		13 June 2017	Korakuen Hall, Tokyo, Japan	
9	Win	7–2	(Thailand) Jamjut Saithonggym	TKO	2 (6),		10 March 2017	Korakuen Hall, Tokyo, Japan	
8	Win	6–2	(Japan) Masaharu Hanaka	TKO	1 (6),		24 December 2016	Korakuen Hall, Tokyo, Japan	
7	Loss	5–2	(Japan) Akira Morita	TKO	3 (4),		21 July 2016	Korakuen Hall, Tokyo, Japan	
6	Win	5–1	(Japan) George Tachibana	UD	4 (4),		31 May 2016	Korakuen Hall, Tokyo, Japan	
5	Win	4–1	(Thailand) Kingpetch Sor Kingpetch	UD	4 (4),		28 March 2016	Korakuen Hall, Tokyo, Japan	
4	Win	3–1	(Japan) Tomoki Takada	TKO	1 (4),		27 January 2016	Korakuen Hall, Tokyo, Japan	
3	Loss	2–1	(Japan) Kosuke Arioka	TKO	3 (4),		11 November 2015	Korakuen Hall, Tokyo, Japan	
2	Win	2–0	(Japan) Ryo Nakano	UD	4 (4),		7 August 2015	Korakuen Hall, Tokyo, Japan	
1	Win	1–0	(Japan) Nao Sugawara	KO	1 (4),		6 May 2015	Ota-City General Gymnasium, Tokyo, Japan	

== See also ==
- List of male kickboxers
