= Naoki Tanaka (kickboxer) =

Japanese male kickboxer (born 1992)

- Born: 田中直樹; 24 June 1992 (age 34); Tokyo, Japan
- Other names: Naoki Seki
- Nickname: Joker
- Nationality: Japanese
- Height: 1.75 m (5 ft 9 in)
- Weight: 63 kg (139 lb; 9 st 13 lb)
- Division: Super Bantamweight
- Style: Karate, Kickboxing
- Fighting out of: Edogawa, Tokyo, Japan
- Team: Paraestra Koiwa (2015-2023); FIGHTER'S FLOW (2025-)
- Rank: Black belt in Gōjū-ryū karate
- Years active: 2015–present

Kickboxing record
- Total: 27
- Wins: 19
- By knockout: 10
- Losses: 8
- By knockout: 4

Other information
- Website: https://naoki-6.jimdosite.com/

Naoki Tanaka (田中直樹, Tanaka Naoki; born 24 June 1992) is a Japanese kickboxer, currently competing in the lightweight division of RISE, where he is the incumbent champion. A professional competitor since 2015, Tanaka has spent his entire professional career with RISE.

Combat Press ranks him as the #5 super bantamweight kickboxer in the world. He's been continually ranked in the top ten since November 2020, peaking at #6 in November and December 2020.

== Kickboxing career ==
=== Background ===
Tanaka began training Gōjū-ryū karate at the age of five. After he entered junior high school, Tanaka went to his current gym, Paraestra Koiwa, with the intention of becoming a mixed martial artist. However, after taking a kickboxing class on his first day at the gym, Tanaka decided to become a professional kickboxer.

=== RISE ===
==== RISE Super Featherweight Rookies Cup ====
Tanaka made his professional debut against Shinji Totsu at RISE ZERO on June 7, 2015. He debut in the super featherweight (-60 kg) division of RISE, participating in the RISE Super Featherweight Rookies Cup. Tanaka won the opening round of the tournament by beating Totsu by unanimous decision, with scores of 30–27, 30–28 and 30–28.

Tanaka was scheduled to face Tomo Janjira in the tournament quarterfinals, held at RISE ZERO on August 9, 2015. He won the fight by a second-round knockout.

Tanaka faced Yuma Isencho in the tournament semifinals, at Rise 107 on October 12, 2015. He won the fight by a third-round knockout, knocking Isencho at the very last second of the bout.

In the tournament final, Tanaka faced Yuya Fujita at Rise 110 on March 26, 2016. Tanaka won the fight by unanimous decision. Prior to this fight, Tanaka changed his ring name from "Naoki Tanaka" to "Naoki".

==== Move to lightweight ====
Tanaka was scheduled to face Fumiya Kawashima at Rise 112 on July 30, 2016, in a super lightweight bout, 5 kg heavier than his previous fights. Tanaka won the fight by unanimous decision, with scores of 30–29, 30–28 and 30–28.

Tanaka was scheduled to face Keisuke Niwa at Rise 114 on November 25, 2016, in a lightweight (63 kg) bout. Tanaka was at the time the #5 ranked RISE lightweight, while Niwa came into the bout as the #4 ranked lightweight contender. Tanaka won the fight by a third-round knockout. He knocked Niwa down with a right straight after the halfway point of the third round, before stopping him with a left hook at the 2:21 minute mark.

Tanaka was scheduled to face the former NJKF lightweight champion Ikki at Rise 115 on January 28, 2017. The fight was ruled a unanimous decision draw after the first three rounds were fought, with all three judges scoring the bout at event 29–29. Ikki was awarded a majority decision, after an extra round was fought.

==== Next Challenger Tournament ====
Tanaka participated in a four-man next challenger tournament, held to decide the next challenger for Fukashi Mizutani's lightweight title. Tanaka, who was at the time the #3 ranked lightweight contender, was scheduled to fight a rematch with the #5 ranked Fumiya Kawashima in the tournament semifinals at Rise 117 on May 20, 2017. The other semifinal pairing consisted of the #1 ranked Shohei Asahara and the #2 ranked Ikki.

Tanaka made quick work of his semifinal opponent, needing only 58 seconds to knock Kawashima with a head kick. Tanaka faced Shohei Asahara in the tournament finals, held at Rise 118 on July 17, 2017. Following a relatively even first round, Asahara knocked Tanaka out with a devastating left hook six seconds into the second round. Tanaka was unable to make a quick recovery inside of the ring and had to be stretchered out.

==== Six–fight winning streak ====
Tanaka was scheduled to fight Tomohiro Kitai in the co-main event of Rise 122 on February 4, 2018. It was the first co-main event appearance of Tanaka's career. The fight was ruled a majority draw after the first three rounds were fought, with two judges scoring the bout an even 30–30, while the third judges scored it 30–29 for Kitai. Kitao won the fight by unanimous decision, after an extra round was fought.

Tanaka was scheduled to face Vitor Toffanelli at Rise 124 on June 25, 2018. He won the fight by unanimous decision, with scores of 30–29, 30–29 and 30–28.

Tanaka was scheduled to face Panuwat TGT at RISE EVOL.2 on February 8, 2019. He won the fight by unanimous decision, with scores of 30–27, 29–27 and 30–27. Tanaka scored the sole knockdown of the fight in the third round, through repeated body shots.

Tanaka was scheduled to fight Mitsuru Nakao at RISE 131 on March 23, 2019. He won the fight by a third-round technical knockout, due to the three-knockdown rule. Tanaka scored the first knockdown with a right uppercut, while the second and third were scored with a right straight. During the post-fight interview, Tanaka called for a fight with the reigning RISE lightweight champion Taiju Shiratori.

Tanaka was scheduled to face the former J-Network lightweight champion Taisuke Maeguchi at RISE 133 on July 5, 2019. He won the fight by a first-round knockout, with Maeguchi succumbing to repeated punches with four seconds left in the round.

Tanaka was scheduled to face Yoshimichi Matsumoto at RISE WORLD SERIES 2019 Final Round on September 16, 2019. Tanaka won the fight by unanimous decision, with all three judges scoring the fight 29–28 in his favor.

Tanaka fought Miki Shiraki for the vacant SWK 65 kg title at Suk Wan Kingthong Go to Raja on November 13, 2019. He won the fight by unanimous decision, with scores of 49–47, 49–48 and 50–48.

=== RISE Dead or Alive 2020 Tournament ===
==== Qualification tournament ====
Tanaka was scheduled to participate in a four-man 2020 RISE Dead or Alive qualification tournament, held at RISE 136 on January 13, 2020. He faced the #1 ranked Rise lightweight Yuma Yamaguchi in the tournament semifinals, while the other semifinal pairing consisted of the #3 ranked Rise lightweight Tomohiro Kitai and NKB lightweight champion Kazuma Takahashi.

Tanaka won the semifinal match against Yamaguchi by a third-round technical knockout, stopping his opponent with a series of strikes with only ten seconds left in the bout. Tanaka faced Tomohiro Kitai in the tournament finals. He knocked Kitai down twice in the second round, which resulted in an automatic technical knockout victory, due to the rules of the tournament.

==== Dead or Alive tournament ====
Tanaka was scheduled to face the former Rise lightweight champion Taiju Shiratori in the semifinals of the RISE DEAD OR ALIVE 2020 tournament, held on October 11, 2020. Kento Haraguchi and Renta Nishioka contested the second semifinal bout. Tanaka won the fight by a first-round technical knockout. At the halfway point of the round, Tanaka landed a knee to the head of Shiratori which opened up a cut, prompting the referee to call in the ringside doctor. The doctor decided to stop the bout, deeming Shiratori unable to continue fighting.

Tanaka advanced to the finals, where he faced the reigning Rise lightweight champion Kento Haraguchi. Haraguchi began pressuring Tanaka as soon as the fight started and managed to knock him down midway through the round. Although Tanaka was able to beat the eight-count, he was unsteady on his feet which prompted the referee to stop the fight.

=== RISE Lightweight champion ===
Tanaka was scheduled to fight Hideki for the vacant RISE Lightweight championship at RISE 145 on January 30, 2021. The fight was announced on the same day that the previous titleholder Kento Haraguchi vacated the belt. Tanaka was at the time the #2 ranked RISE lightweight contender, while the two-time lightweight title challenger Hideki came into the bout as the #1 ranked lightweight contender. Tanaka won the fight by unanimous decision, with scores of 48–46, 48–46 and 48–45. He scored two knockdowns, one each in the first and the fourth round.

Tanaka was scheduled to face Taiju Shiratori, in a non-title bout, at RISE WORLD SERIES 2021 Yokohama on September 23, 2021. The fight was a rematch of their October 11, 2020 meeting in the semifinals of the 2020 Rise Dead or Alive tournament, which Tanaka won by a first-round technical knockout. Tanaka won the fight by unanimous decision, after an extra round was fought. Despite a slow start to the fight, Tanaka became more and more active as the bout went on and managed to fight Shiratori to a draw after the first three rounds. He convincingly won the extra round, with Shiratori being unable to mount any sustained offense.

Tanaka was scheduled to face the former Rajadamnern Stadium and WBC Muaythai lightweight champion Jaroenchai Liongym in a non-title bout at RISE 153 on December 12, 2021. Tanaka saw this as a showcase fight, saying before the fight: "I want to overwhelm a former world-class fighter and show that I can fight fighters who are currently world class". He won the fight by a third-round technical knockout. Tanaka first knocked Jaroenchai down with a check left hook as the latter was pressing forwards, before forcing the referee to wave the fight off with a flurry of unanswered punches.

Tanaka vacated the Suk Wan Kingthong super lightweight title on March 17, 2022, as he was unable to make a title defense in the mandated time.

Tanaka was booked to face the RISE Super Lightweight champion Kosei Yamada at RISE El Dorado 2022 on April 2, 2022, in a super lightweight non-title bout. He lost the fight by third round knockout after scoring a knockdown in the previous round.

Tanaka faced the Wu Lin Feng -63 kg World champion Denis Wosik at Glory 81: Ben Saddik vs. Adegbuyi 2 on August 20, 2022, as part of the Glory and RISE agreement to periodically exchange fighters. He lost the fight by unanimous decision, with all five judges scoring the bout 30–26 for Wosik. Tanaka was knocked down with a spinning backfist in the second round and suffered a cut above his right eye in the third round.

Tanaka faced the two-time WBC Muaythai title challenger Chadd Collins in a catchweight (-64 kg) bout at RISE World Series 2022 on October 15, 2022. He lost the fight by a second-round technical knockout. Tanaka was first knocked down with a left hook near the midway point of the second round and was stopped with a flurry of punches soon after.

Tanaka made his first RISE lightweight title defense against Kan Nakamura at RISE 167 on April 21, 2023. He lost the fight by majority decision, with two scorecards of 49–48 and one scorecard of 48–48.

Tanaka was expected to make his return, following a 15-month absence from professional competition, against Frank-chan at RISE 180 on July 26, 2024. He withdrew from the fight on July 11, after suffering a fracture of the right fifth phalangeal bone.

== Mixed martial arts career ==
On March 22, 2025, it was announced that Tanaka had begun training at FIGHTER'S FLOW and would transition to mixed martial arts later in the year. Tanaka made his mixed martial arts debut against Takahiro Okuyama at DEEP 125 Impact on May 5, 2025. He won the fight by a first-round knockout.

Tanaka made his Rizin FF debut against Takahiro Ashida at Super Rizin 4 on July 27, 2025. He lost the fight by unanimous decision.

== Championships and accomplishments ==
- Suk Wan Kingthong
  - 2019 Suk Wan Kingthong 65 kg Champion
- RISE
  - 2016 RISE Super Featherweight Rookies Cup Winner
  - 2020 RISE Lightweight Qualification Tournament Winner
  - 2020 RISE Dead or Alive Lightweight Tournament Runner-up
  - 2021 RISE Lightweight Championship

== Mixed martial arts record ==
Professional record breakdown
6 matches	4 wins	2 losses
By knockout	3	1
By submission	1	0
By decision	0	1

Res.	Record	Opponent	Method	Event	Date	Round	Time	Location	Notes
Win	4–2	Issa Hosokawa	TKO (doctor stoppage)	Rizin 54	August 11, 2026	2	3:09	Tokyo, Japan	Catchweight (152 lb) bout.
Win	3–2	Kaisei Kuroi	TKO (knees and punches)	Rizin Landmark 14	June 6, 2026	1	3:37	Sendai, Japan	
Win	2–2	Takeaki Kinoshita	Technical Submission (rear-naked choke)	DEEP 130 Impact	March 20, 2026	1	0:22	Tokyo, Japan	
Loss	1–2	Shunki Mitsui	KO (punch)	DEEP 128 Impact	November 2, 2025	1	0:27	Tokyo, Japan	
Loss	1–1	Takahiro Ashida	Decision (unanimous)	Super Rizin 4	July 27, 2025	3	5:00	Saitama, Japan	Catchweight (150 lb) bout.
Win	1–0	Takahiro Okuyama	KO (punch)	DEEP 125 Impact	May 5, 2025	1	1:48	Tokyo, Japan	Featherweight debut.

== Kickboxing and Muay Thai record ==
Professional Kickboxing Record
19 Wins (10 (T)KO's), 8 Losses, 0 Draw, 0 No Contest
Date	Result	Opponent	Event	Location	Method	Round	Time
2023-04-21	Loss	(Japan) Kan Nakamura	RISE 167	Tokyo, Japan	Decision (Majority)	5	3:00
Loses the RISE Lightweight title.
2022-10-15	Loss	(Australia) Chadd Collins	RISE WORLD SERIES 2022	Tokyo, Japan	KO (Punches)	2	1:42
2022-08-20	Loss	(Germany) Denis Wosik	Glory 81: Ben Saddik vs. Adegbuyi 2	Düsseldorf, Germany	Decision (Unanimous)	3	3:00
2022-04-02	Loss	(Japan) Kosei Yamada	RISE El Dorado 2022	Tokyo, Japan	KO (Punches)	3	0:24
2021-12-12	Win	(Thailand) Jaroenchai Liongym	RISE 153	Tokyo, Japan	TKO (Punches)	3	0:46
2021-09-23	Win	(Japan) Taiju Shiratori	RISE WORLD SERIES 2021 Yokohama	Yokohama, Japan	Ext. R. Decision (Unanimous)	4	3:00
2021-01-30	Win	(Japan) Hideki Sasaki	RISE 145	Bunkyo, Tokyo, Japan	Decision (Unanimous)	5	3:00
Wins the vacant RISE Lightweight title.
2020-10-11	Loss	(Japan) Kento Haraguchi	RISE DEAD OR ALIVE 2020 Yokohama, Tournament Finals	Yokohama, Japan	TKO (Punches)	1	1:53
2020-10-11	Win	(Japan) Taiju Shiratori	RISE DEAD OR ALIVE 2020 Yokohama, Tournament Semifinals	Yokohama, Japan	TKO (Cut to Forehead)	1	1:30
2020-01-13	Win	(Japan) Tomohiro Kitai	RISE 136, Tournament Final	Tokyo, Japan	TKO (Two knockdown rule)	2	2:50
Wins the RISE 63kg Qualification Tournament.
2020-01-13	Win	(Japan) Yuma Yamaguchi	RISE 136, Tournament Semifinal	Tokyo, Japan	TKO (Two knockdown rule)	3	2:50
2019-11-13	Win	(Japan) Miki Shiraki	Suk Wan Kingthong Go to Raja	Tokyo, Japan	Decision (Unanimous)	5	3:00
Wins the vacant SWK 65kg title.
2019-09-16	Win	(Japan) Yoshimichi Matsumoto	RISE WORLD SERIES 2019 Final Round	Chiba, Japan	Decision (Unanimous)	3	3:00
2019-07-05	Win	(Japan) Taison Maeguchi	RISE 133	Tokyo, Japan	KO (Punches)	1	2:56
2019-03-23	Win	(Japan) Mitsuru Nakao	RISE 131	Tokyo, Japan	TKO (Three knockdown rule)	2	1:31
2019-02-08	Win	(Thailand) Panuwat TGT	RISE EVOL.2	Tokyo, Japan	Decision (Unanimous)	3	3:00
2018-05-25	Win	(Brazil) Vitor Toffanelli	Rise 124	Tokyo, Japan	Decision (Unanimous)	3	3:00
2018-02-04	Loss	(Japan) Tomohiro Kitai	Rise 122	Tokyo, Japan	Ext. R. Decision (Unanimous)	4	3:00
2017-07-17	Loss	(Japan) Shohei Asahara	Rise 118, Tournament Final	Tokyo, Japan	KO (Left hook)	2	0:06
2017-05-20	Win	(Japan) Fumiya Kawashima	Rise 117, Tournament Semifinal	Tokyo, Japan	KO (Head kick)	1	0:58
2017-01-28	Loss	(Japan) Ikki	Rise 115	Tokyo, Japan	Ext. R. Decision (Majority)	4	3:00
2016-11-25	Win	(Japan) Keisuke Niwa	Rise 114	Tokyo, Japan	KO (Left hook)	3	2:21
2016-07-30	Win	(Japan) Fumiya Kawashima	Rise 112	Tokyo, Japan	Decision (Unanimous)	3	3:00
2016-03-26	Win	(Japan) Yuya Fujita	Rise 110, Tournament Final	Tokyo, Japan	Decision (Unanimous)	3	3:00
Wins RISE Super Featherweight Rookies Cup.
2015-10-12	Win	(Japan) Yuma Isencho	Rise 107, Tournament Semifinal	Tokyo, Japan	KO	3	3:00
2015-08-09	Win	(Japan) Tomo Janjira	RISE ZERO, Tournament Quarterfinal	Tokyo, Japan	TKO	2	2:07
2015-06-07	Win	(Japan) Shinji Totsu	RISE ZERO, Tournament Opening Round	Tokyo, Japan	Decision (Unanimous)	3	3:00
Legend: Win Loss Draw/No contest Notes

== See also ==
- List of male kickboxers
