= Ryota Nakano (kickboxer) =

Japanese kickboxer (born 1996)

- Born: 中野椋太; August 2, 1996 (age 30); Osaka, Japan
- Nickname: Naniwa's Player
- Height: 175 cm (5 ft 9 in)
- Weight: 67.5 kg (149 lb; 10.63 st)
- Fighting out of: Osaka, Japan
- Team: Wakashishi Kaikan (2014); 777GYM (2015-2018); Seishikai (2018-present)
- Years active: 2014-present

Kickboxing record
- Total: 33
- Wins: 23
- By knockout: 11
- Losses: 9
- By knockout: 4
- Draws: 1

Ryota Nakano (Japanese: 中野椋太, Nakano Ryota; born August 2, 1996) is a Japanese professional kickboxer, currently competing in the welterweight divisions of RISE and NJKF. He is a former RISE welterweight champion.

As of April 2022, Combat Press ranks him as the tenth best super featherweight kickboxer in the world.

== Martial arts career ==
=== NJKF ===
==== Early NJKF career ====
Nakano was booked to face Takaya Donhie at NJKF 2018 west 3rd on May 27, 2018. He won the fight by a third-round technical knockout. He move up a weight class to welterweight for his next bout, against Jun Da Lion at NJKF WEST Young Fight 4th on August 19, 2018. He won the fight by unanimous decision, with all three judges scoring the fight 30–27 for him. Nakano briefly moved away from NJKF for his next fight, as he faced Kazuki Hamasaki at Hoost Cup Kings Osaka 3 on October 28, 2018. He won the fight by a third-round technical knockout, as Hamasaki's corner threw in the towel at the 0:31 minute mark.

==== NJKF welterweight champion ====
His three-fight winning streak earned Nakano the opportunity to challenge the reigning NJFK welterweight champion TETSURO at NJKF 2018 West 4th on December 16, 2018. He won the fight by a dominant unanimous decision, with all three judges scoring the bout 50–44 in his favor. Nakano knocked the champion down with a right hook in the second round and cut him with an elbow in the fourth round, after which the ringside physician was called in to check on TETSURO.

Nakano faced the one-time Rajadamnern Stadium and Lumpinee Stadium champion Pakorn P.K. Saenchai Muaythaigym in the co-main event of The Battle Of Muay Thai Season 2 vol.1 on April 14, 2019. He lost the fight by a second-round low kick knockout.

Nakano faced Yuya at RISE WORLD SERIES 2019 Semi-final Round in OSAKA on July 21, 2019. He won the fight by a first-round knockout, stopping Yuya with a left hook.

Nakano faced Kyung Jae Cho in a non-title bout at NJKF 2019 West 4th on September 22, 2019. He lost the fight by unanimous decision. Nakano faced Hayato Hatakeyama for the S-1 Japan super lightweight title at NJKF 2019 4th on November 30, 2019. He won the fight by a second-round technical knockout.

Nakano made his second RISE appearance against the RISE Super Lightweight champion Kosei Yamada in a non-title bout at RISE 137 on February 23, 2020. He lost his first fight of the year by unanimous decision, with scores of 30–29, 30–29, 30–28. Nakano made his second RISE appearance in his second and last fight of the year, against Hiroto Yamaguchi at RISE DEAD OR ALIVE2020 Osaka on November 1, 2020. He won the fight by majority decision, with scores of 29–28, 28–28 and 30–28.

=== RISE ===
==== Early RISE career ====
Nakano, at the time the #1 ranked WBC Muaythai Japan welterweight contender, was booked to face Yuya Yamato for the vacant WBC Muaythai title at Yamato Gym 50th Anniversary Tournament on July 11, 2021. He won the fight by a second-round knockout, as he stopped Yamato with low kicks.

Nakano was booked to face Masaya Jaki at Rise World Series 2021 Osaka 2 on November 14, 2021. He won the fight by a second-round technical knockout. He staggered Jaki with a left hook, before forcing a referee stoppage with a flurry of punches at the 2:16 minute mark.

Nakano faced Chansuk for the vacant S1 super lightweight title in the main event of NJKF 2022 west 1st on February 5, 2022. He won the fight by a third-round technical knockout.

==== RISE welterweight champion ====
Nakano faced Masashi Nakajima at RISE 156 on March 27, 2022, in a fight serving as the semi-final for the vacant RISE welterweight championship tournament. He won the fight by unanimous decision. Nakano was next booked to face Ryoya Inai for the vacant title at RISE 158 on May 29, 2022. He won the fight by knockout in the second round to capture the vacant title.

Nakano faced Chadd Collins in a non-title bout at RISE WORLD SERIES 2022 Osaka on August 21, 2022. He lost the fight by a first-round knockout. Although Nakano was able to rise to his feet following a knockdown near the end of the opening round, he was visibly staggered, which prompted the referee to wave the fight off.

Nakano faced the one-time RISE Middleweight champion Lee Sung-hyun in a super welterweight bout at RISE World Series 2023 - 1st Round on July 2, 2023. He won the fight by a second-round spinning backfist knockout.

Nakano faced Petru Morari at RISE WORLD SERIES 2023 Final Round on December 16, 2023. He lost the fight by majority decision, with scores of 30–29, 30–28 and 29–29.

Nakano was expected to make his first RISE Welterweight (-67.5kg) championship defense against Ryoya Inai at RISE 177 on April 21, 2024. Inai withdrew from the bout on April 12, as his eyesight had deteriorated due to a left rhegmatogenous retinal detachment.

Nakano faced Meison Hide Usami at RISE WORLD SERIES 2024 OSAKA on June 15, 2024. The fight ended in a majority decision draw, after two extra rounds were contested.

Nakano faced Lee Sung-hyun in a re-match at RISE WORLD SERIES 2024 YOKOHAMA on September 8, 2024. He lost the fight by majority decision, with scores of 30—29, 30—29 and 29—29.

== Championships and accomplishments ==
- New Japan Kickboxing Federation
  - 2018 NJKF Welterweight (-67.5 kg) Championship
- WBC Muaythai
  - 2021 WBC Muaythai Japan Welterweight (-67.5 kg) Championship
- Onesongchai
  - 2019 S-1 Japan Super Lightweight (-65 kg) Championship
  - 2022 S-1 World Welterweight (-67 kg) Championship
- RISE
  - 2022 RISE Welterweight (-67.5kg) Championship

== Fight record ==
Professional Kickboxing Record
22 Wins (11 (T)KO's), 9 Losses, 1 Draw, 0 No Contest
Date	Result	Opponent	Event	Location	Method	Round	Time
2025-07-25	Win	(France) Arthur Klopp	ONE Friday Fights 117, Lumpinee Stadium	Bangkok, Thailand	Decision (Split)	3	3:00
2024-09-08	Loss	(South Korea) Lee Sung-hyun	RISE WORLD SERIES 2024 YOKOHAMA	Yokohama, Japan	Decision (Majority)	3	3:00
2024-06-15	Draw	(Japan) Meison Hide Usami	RISE WORLD SERIES 2024 OSAKA	Osaka, Japan	Tech. Decision (Majority)	2	
2023-12-16	Loss	(Moldova) Petru Morari	RISE World Series 2023 - Final Round	Tokyo, Japan	Decision (Majority)	3	3:00
2023-07-02	Win	(South Korea) Lee Sung-hyun	RISE World Series 2023 - 1st Round	Osaka, Japan	KO (Spinning back fist)	2	1:05
2022-08-21	Loss	(Australia) Chadd Collins	RISE WORLD SERIES OSAKA 2022	Osaka, Japan	KO (Punches)	1	2:43
2022-05-29	Win	(Japan) Ryoya Inai	RISE 158	Tokyo, Japan	KO (Punches)	2	1:39
Wins the vacant RISE Welterweight title.
2022-03-27	Win	(Japan) Masashi Nakajima	RISE 156	Tokyo, Japan	Decision (Unanimous)	3	3:00
2022-02-05	Win	(Thailand) Chansuk VertexGym	NJKF 2022 west 1st	Osaka, Japan	TKO	3	2:44
Won vacant S-1 World Welterweight title.
2021-11-14	Win	(Japan) Masaya Jaki	Rise World Series 2021 Osaka 2	Osaka, Japan	TKO (Punches)	2	2:56
2021-07-11	Win	(Japan) Yuya Yamato	Yamato Gym 50th Anniversary Tournament	Nagoya, Japan	KO (Right low kick)	2	2:16
Won vacant WBC Muaythai Japan welterweight title.
2020-11-10	Win	(Japan) Hiroto Yamaguchi	RISE DEAD OR ALIVE 2020 Osaka	Osaka, Japan	KO (Right low kick)	2	2:16
2020-02-23	Loss	(Japan) Kosei Yamada	RISE 137	Tokyo, Japan	Decision (Unanimous)	3	3:00
2019-11-30	Win	(Japan) Hayato Hatakeyama	NJKF 2019 4th	Tokyo, Japan	TKO (Punches)	2	2:01
Won vacant S-1 Japan Super Lightweight title.
2019-09-22	Loss	(South Korea) Kyung Jae Cho	NJKF 2019 West 4th	Osaka, Japan	Decision (Unanimous)	3	3:00
2019-07-21	Win	(Japan) Yuya	RISE WORLD SERIES 2019 Semi-final Round in OSAKA	Osaka, Japan	KO (Left hook)	1	
2019-04-14	Loss	(Thailand) Pakorn P.K. Saenchai Muaythaigym	The Battle Of Muay Thai Season 2 vol.1	Yokohama, Japan	KO (Right low kick)	2	0:58
2018-12-16	Win	(Japan) TETSURO	NJKF 2018 West 4th	Osaka, Japan	Decision (Unanimous)	3	3:00
Won the NJKF welterweight title.
2018-10-28	Win	(Japan) Kazuki Hamasaki	Hoost Cup Kings Osaka 3	Osaka, Japan	TKO (Corner stoppage)	3	0:31
2018-07-19	Win	(Japan) Jun Da Lion	NJKF WEST Young Fight 4th	Osaka, Japan	Decision (Unanimous)	3	3:00
2018-05-27	Win	(Japan) Takaya Donhie	NJKF 2018 west 3rd	Osaka, Japan	KO	3	2:33
2017-05-28	Loss	(Brazil) Vito Tofanelli	ING International Interleague Play	Tokyo, Japan	KO (Spinning wheel kick)	2	2:37
2017-02-05	Loss	(Japan) Katsuki Kitano	NJKF 2017 west 1st	Tokyo, Japan	KO (Head kick)	1	1:23
2016-11-20	Win	(Japan) Yosuke YAMATO	HOOST CUP KINGS NAGOYA II ~ REVOLUTION	Nagoya, Japan	KO (Right straight)	1	1:47
2016-06-26	Win	(Japan) Tomoto Oishi	NJKF 2016 4th	Nagoya, Japan	TKO	2	2:06
2015-12-19	Win	(Japan) Yuta Takahashi	MAT vol.1	Tokyo, Japan	Decision (Majority)	3	3:00
2015-11-01	Win	(Japan) SAMUEL	NJKF 2015 8th	Osaka, Japan	Decision (Split)	3	3:00
2014-11-02	Win	(Japan) Seiya Amano	NJKF 2014 7th	Osaka, Japan	Decision (Unanimous)	3	3:00
2013-09-15	Win	(Japan) Kei Hachino	NJKF 2013 5th	Osaka, Japan	Decision (Unanimous)	3	3:00
Legend: Win Loss Draw/No contest Notes

== See also ==
- List of male kickboxers
