= Kento Haraguchi =

Japanese kickboxer (born 1998)

- Born: 原口健飛; April 9, 1998 (age 28); Itami, Hyōgo Japan
- Height: 175 cm (5 ft 9 in)
- Weight: 65 kg (143 lb; 10.2 st)
- Division: Super Featherweight; Lightweight; Super Lightweight; Welterweight
- Style: Kickboxing, karate, boxing
- Stance: Southpaw
- Fighting out of: Takarazuka, Japan
- Team: FASCINATE FIGHT TEAM
- Years active: 2015 - present

Professional boxing record
- Total: 5
- Wins: 4
- By knockout: 2
- Losses: 1

Kickboxing record
- Total: 37
- Wins: 30
- By knockout: 18
- Losses: 6
- By knockout: 1
- Draws: 1

Other information
- Boxing record from BoxRec

Kento Haraguchi (原口 健飛), Haraguchi Kento; born (9 April 1998) is a Japanese kickboxer and former boxer, currently competing in the super lightweight division of RISE. He is the 2026 GLORY x RISE Last Featherweight Standing Tournament winner, the former ISKA Oriental Rules World Light Welterweight (-65 kg) champion, the former RISE Lightweight (-62.5 kg) champion and the 2020 RISE Dead or Alive Lightweight (-62.5 kg) tournament winner.

Haraguchi began his competitive career in Full Contact karate. He won three titles in elementary school between 2008 and 2011, four in the middle school between 2012 and 2014, as well as the Dageki Kakutougi Japan Cup in the adult featherweight event in his return to the sport in 2017. In between his two karate stints, Haraguchi fought as a professional boxer, but quit the sport after suffering his first loss in the semifinals of the 2016 West Japan Rookie of the Year tournament.

As of April 2023, Haraguchi is ranked as the fifth best super featherweight (-66 kg) kickboxer in the world by Combat Press and the sixth best super featherweight (-67.5 kg) by Beyond Kickboxing, having first entered the Combat Press divisional rankings in July 2022 and Beyond Kickboxing rankings in October 2022. He was previously ranked as a top ten super bantamweight (-64 kg) kickboxer by Combat Press between November 2020 and May 2022.

== Personal life ==
Haraguchi married at the age of 19. He is a father of two daughters. His first daughter, Noa, was born when he was 17 and a second-year in high school.

== Kickboxing career ==
=== ACCEL ===
==== ACCEL Featherweight title reign ====
Haraguchi made his professional debut against Shiro Kajihara at All Boxing World 10th. He won the fight by a third-round technical knockout. His debut win, as well as his boxing and karate career, earned Haraguchi the chance to fight Fumihiro Uesugi at ACCEL vol.37, in Uesugi's fifth title defense. During the first round of their bout, Uesugi looked to push into the pocket behind a high guard, however, Haraguchi kept distance with a front kick and racked up damage with body kicks. Near the end of the first round, Haraguchi staggered his opponent with a left hook and knocked him down through a combination of punches. Haraguchi immediately pressured as the second round began, thoroughly dominating the champion and forcing him to take a knee three times, which awarded Hariguchi the technical knockdown.

Haraguchi participated in the RISE Dead or Alive 57 kg tournament, held at RISE 121. He was scheduled to fight Taiki Naito in the quarterfinals. The fight was ruled a draw after the first three rounds, which resulted in an extra fourth round being fought. Naito won the extra round by unanimous decision.

Haraguchi was scheduled to make his first title defense against Shogo Kuriaki at ACCEL vol.38. Although the fight was close, Haraguchi won the fight by unanimous decision, with all the judges awarding him all three rounds.

He returned to RISE at RISE 132, when he was scheduled to fight the #6 ranked RISE Super Featherweight Jun Aiolos. Haraguchi dominated the bout, knocking Aiolos down twice in the first round and twice in the second round, before Aiolos' corner threw in the towel. Haraguchi was scheduled to fight Henry Cejas in a non-title bout at ACCEL vol.39. Haraguchi fought mainly off the back-foot, slowly accumulating damage on his opponent, before knocking Cejas out with a jumping switch kick at the very end of the third round.

==== Road to RIZIN ====
Haraguchi was scheduled to participate in the Road to RIZIN Tournament, held during RISE 125. He was scheduled to fight the WBC Muaythai International Featherweight champion Momotaro in the semifinals, with the other semifinal bout being contested by Shuto Miyazaki and Yamato Fujita. Haraguchi beat Momotaro by a closely contested unanimous decision, with all three judges awarding him a single round, while scoring the other two rounds as draws. He was more dominant in the final bout against Shuto Miyazaki, winning once again by unanimous decision (30–26, 30-28 and 30–27). Winning the tournament earned him the opportunity to fight at the next RIZIN event.

Haraguchi was scheduled to make his second title defense against Chibita at ACCEL vol.40. Early on in the first round, Haraguchi landed a body kick which broke Chibita's ribs, while a second kick to the body resulted in the first knockdown of the fight. Haraguchi kept kicking Chibita's body which resulted in a knockout 90 seconds into the fight.

Haraguchi made his RIZIN debut at RIZIN 13, when he was scheduled to fight the former K-1 Super Featherweight champion Taiga Kawabe. The closely contested fight was ruled a majority draw, with one of the three judges awarding Haraguchi a 30-29 scorecard.

=== RISE ===
Haraguchi was scheduled to fight the ISKA Spain K-1 and Muay Thai champion Miguel Martinez during the opening round of the 2019 RISE World Series. The fight ended after just 25 seconds, as Haraguchi knocked Martinez out with a body kick.

Haraguchi was next scheduled to fight against the #2 ranked RISE lightweight Tomohiro Kitai at RISE 132. Haraguchi made use of his superior speed and outfighting ability to win by unanimous decision, winning all three rounds on the judges scorecards.

In the semifinal event of the RISE World Series, Haraguchi faced Lu Jun. Jun came into the fight 0.8 kg over the weight limit. He was given a one-point deduction and heavier gloves as a penalty for the weight miss. Haraguchi managed to stagger Jun with a head kick at the very beginning of the match, before knocking him out after only 67 seconds of the first round.

At Rise World Series 2019 Final Round, Haraguchi was scheduled to fight the 2017 RISE Super Featherweight champion Chan Hyung Lee. Haraguchi was dominant throughout the fight, winning the fight by unanimous decision. Two of the judges awarded him 30–27 on their scorecards, with the last one awarding him a 30-28 scorecard.

On September 1, 2019, Haraguchi was scheduled to fight the former KNOCK OUT Lightweight champion Yosuke Morii at JAPAN KICKBOXING INNOVATION, in a five-round fight with elbows allowed. Haraguchi looked to push the pace, pressuring Morii with kicks, with Morii looking to relieve the pressure through clinch work. Haraguchi scored the first knockdown in the second round with a right hook. Less than 30 seconds into the third round, Haraguchi once again scored a knockdown with a right hook. Although Morii was able to beat the eight count, the referee nonetheless decided the wave the fight off.

=== RISE Lightweight champion ===
==== Title reign ====
Haraguchi was scheduled to fight the #1 ranked RISE Lightweight, and one-time title challenger, Hideki at RISE 136 for the vacant RISE Lightweight championship. Haraguchi came into the fight as the #2 ranked RISE lightweight, on a five-fight winning streak. The fight began with both fighters fighting out of the southpaw stance, trading low leg kicks. The fight ended in the last minute of the first round, as Haraguchi knocked his opponent down with a lead right hook counter to Hideki's left straight. Hideki was unable to beat the eight-count, resulting in a knockout victory for Haraguchi. During his post-fight speech, Haraguchi called out the previous RISE Lightweight champion Taiju Shiratori.

Haraguchi was scheduled to fight Chadd Collins in the semifinals of the 2020 RISE World Series tournament. The other two semifinalists were Nuenglanlek Jitmuangnon and Taiju Shiratori. The RISE World Series tournament was later scrapped, as Collins and Nuenglanlek were unable to enter the country at the time, due to travel restrictions imposed in order to slow the spread of COVID-19. Haraguchi was instead scheduled to fight Vitor Tofanelli at Rise on Abema, in a 67 kg bout, 4 kilograms above Haraguchi's usual weight. Haraguchi won the fight by unanimous decision, utilizing outfighting to score on the advancing Tofanelli.

Haraguchi was scheduled to fight a rematch with Taiga Kawabe at Rizin 23 – Yokohama. Their first match at Rizin 13 was ruled a draw. Since their first fight, Haraguchi had won all seven of his fights, while Taiga entered the fight with only a single win in past seven fights. Haraguchi dominated the entirety of the bout, knocking Taiga down three times in less than three minutes, winning the fight by a technical knockout.

==== RISE Dead or Alive Tournament ====
His position as the RISE Lightweight champion earned Haraguchi a place in the 2020 RISE Dead of Alive 63 kg tournament, being scheduled to fight the 2018 SHOOT BOXING Japan Lightweight Champion Renta Nishioka in the semifinals. The two other participants in the tournament were Naoki Tanaka and Taiju Shiratori, with Haraguchi and Shiratori being the favorites to enter the tournament final.

In the semifinals bout, Haraguchi beat Renta Nishioka through a dominant unanimous decision, justifying his role as the favorite. Haraguchi then faced Naoki Tanaka in the finals. He immediately pressured Tanaka backwards with a combination of body-head punches and managed to knock Tanaka down, after successfully pushing his opponent into the ring corner. Although Tanaka managed to beat the eight-count, the referee decided to wave the fight off due to Tanaka being unsteady on his feet. Haraguchi was awarded ¥5,000,000 for winning the tournament, as well as a ¥500,000 knockout bonus.

During the post-fight interview, Haraguchi reiterated his desire to fight Taiju Shiratori, with RISE president Takashi Ito likewise stating that the Haraguchi-Shiratori bout was in their 2021 plans.

=== Move to super lightweight ===
==== Haraguchi vs. Shiratori ====
On December 15, 2020, Haraguchi vacated the RISE Lightweight title, stating that he wanted to focus on a planned RISE Dead or Alive tournament. Haraguchi was expected to face the Glory featherweight champion Petpanomrung Kiatmuu9 at RISE El Dorado in February 2021. Petpanomrung was unable to enter Japan, as the travel restrictions imposed to combat the COVID-19 pandemic were extended from February 7 to March 7. He was accordingly replaced by the 2019 RISE Lightweight Champion Taiju Shiratori, 24 days before the event. The two of them were previously scheduled to participate in the RISE WORLD SERIES 2020 –63 kg Tournament, which was to be held in spring of 2020, but was cancelled due to the emerging COVID-19 pandemic. They were also expected to fight in the final of the DEAD OR ALIVE 2020 –63 kg class tournament held on October 11, 2020, as they were both favorites in their semifinal bouts. However, Shiratori unexpectedly lost to Naoki Tanaka.

During the first round of the fight against Shiratori, Haraguchi focused on landing the right straight and body kicks on his southpaw opponent. During the second round, Haraguchi managed to knock Shiratori down twice. The first knockdown came after Haraguchi switched to southpaw and landed a partial spinning hook kick to the head of Shiratori. The second knockdown came as both fighters were turning to face each-other and Haraguchi landed a head kick from the orthodox stance. Haraguchi continued to pressure in the third round, but was unable to finish Shiratori, winning the fight by unanimous decision. During the post-fight conference, RISE representative Takashi Ito stated that the Petpanomrung Kiatmuu9 fight was still in the organization's plans.

==== Haraguchi vs. Tapruwan ====
Haraguchi was scheduled to face the former WMC World featherweight and RISE Super Lightweight champion Tapruwan Hadesworkout at RISE WORLD SERIES 2021 Yokohama on September 23, 2021. The bout was contested at a 65.5 kg catch-weight, 2.5 kg above Haraguchi's usual weight. Although RISE had other opponents in mind for Haraguchi, restrictions imposed due to the COVID-19 pandemic forced them to rely on competitors currently present in Japan. Haraguchi won the fight by a third-round technical knockout. After an even first-round, Tapruwan managed to knock Haraguchi down with a knee strike in the second round. Haraguchi rallied in the third round and knocked Tapruwan down with a left hook. Although his opponent was able to beat the eight-count, Haraguchi soon after unloaded with a barrage of punches, which forced the referee to stop the fight.

==== Haraguchi vs. Petpanomrung ====
On October 22, 2021, it was revealed by that Haraguchi would face the four-time defending Glory Featherweight Champion Petpanomrung Kiatmuu9 at RISE World Series 2021 Osaka 2 on November 14, 2021. The pair was originally scheduled to face each other at RISE El Dorado on February 28, 2021, before the fight was eventually postponed due to the COVID-19 pandemic. Haraguchi lost the fight by unanimous decision, with two judges awarding Petpanomrung a 30-28 scorecard, and the third judge scoring the fight 30-29 for him. Haraguchi was unable to mount any consistent offense against the Thai, who in turn successfully landed a great volume of knees and kicks, although he was given a yellow card for illegal clinching in the second round.

==== Haraguchi vs. Lompetch, Yamazaki ====
At a press conference held by RISE on February 18, 2022, it was announced that Haraguchi would next face the ISKA Muay thai world super lightweight champion Lompetch Y'zdgym. The fight was scheduled for RISE El Dorado 2022, which took place on April 2, 2022. He won the fight by first-round technical knockout, scoring three knockdowns in one round. Haraguchi next faced the K-1 World GP 2016 -65kg Japan Tournament winner and one-time K-1 Super Lightweight champion Hideaki Yamazaki on June 19, 2022, on the undercard of The Match 2022. The event was broadcast by Abema TV as a pay per view. Haraguchi won the fight by a second-round technical knockout. He knocked Yamazaki down twice in the opening round, first time with a flurry of punches with under a minute left in the round and the second time with a straight. Following a second knockdown in the next round, the referee opted to step in and stop the fight. It was later revealed that Haraguchi had broken Yamazaki's jaw, who was forced to undergo surgery as a result.

==== Haraguchi vs. Petpanomrung II ====
Haraguchi was booked to face the Glory Featherweight champion Petpanomrung Kiatmuu9 for the inaugural RISE World Super Lightweight title in the main event of RISE WORLD SERIES OSAKA 2022 on August 21, 2022. The bout would be a rematch of their November 14, 2021 meeting, which Petpanomrung won by unanimous decision. The fight was ruled a split decision draw after the first five rounds, with all three judges turning in different scorecards. Judge Miyamoto scored the fight 50–49 for Haraguchi, judge Nagase scored it 49–48 for Petpanomrung, while judge Wada had it as an even 49–49 draw. Accordingly, an extra round was fought, after which Petpanomrung won a unanimous decision. Haraguchi was dissatisfied with the decision and claimed he would request a review of the judges' decision in his post-fight interview. RISE CEO Takashi Ito confirmed that the review will be held, should Haraguchi request it. Haraguchi withdrew his post-fight comments the next day, although he still expressed his concern with how the fights were refereed.

==== Haraguchi vs. Adamchuk ====
On October 15, 2022, it was revealed that Haraguchi would face the Shootboxing and Glory veteran Zakaria Zouggary at RISE WORLD SERIES / Glory Rivals 4 on December 25, 2022, in what was his third consecutive appearance at a RISE and Glory cross-promotional event and his third fight at the super lightweight (-65 kg) limit. On November 24, it was announced that Zouggary had withdrawn from the fight with an undisclosed injury and would be replaced by the former Glory Featherweight champion Serhiy Adamchuk. He won the fight by unanimous decision, with one scorecard of 30–28 and two scorecards of 30–27.

==== ISKA World champion ====
Haraguchi faced Jérémy Monteiro for the vacant ISKA Light Welterweight (-65 kg) K-1 Rules World title at RISE EL DORADO 2023 on March 26, 2023. Monteiro held the Light Welterweight Oriental Rules title at the time and had previously unsuccessfully challenged for the muay thai rules championship as well. Haraguchi won the fight by a fourth-round technical knockout. He was up 30–27, 30–27 and 30–28 on the judges' scorecards at the time of the stoppage.

Haraguchi faced the two-time Glory Featherweight title challenger Anvar Boynazarov at RISE World Series 2023 - 1st Round on July 2, 2023. He won the fight by a first-round knockout, as he stopped Boynarazov with a body kick after just 90 seconds.

Haraguchi faced the one-time Glory Featherweight title challenger Abraham Vidales at RISE WORLD SERIES 2023 Final Round on December 16, 2023. He won the fight by a second-round knockout.

Haraguchi challenged Petpanomrung Kiatmuu9 for the Glory Featherweight Championship at Glory 93 on July 20, 2024. He lost the fight by unanimous decision.

Haraguchi faced Miguel Trindade in the quarterfinals of the GLORY RISE Featherweight Grand Prix, held on December 21, 2024, in Chiba, Japan. He lost the fight by a first-round knockout.

Haraguchi faced the former RISE Middleweight champion Lee Sung-hyun at RISE ELDORADO 2025 on March 29, 2025. He won the fight by unanimous decision, with all three judges scoring the bout 30—27 in his favor.

Haraguchi challenged the RISE Super Lightweight (-65kg) World champion Chadd Collins at RISE World Series 2025 Tokyo on August 2, 2025. He lost the fight by split decision.

== Championships and accomplishments ==
=== Titles ===
Professional

- ACCEL
  - 2017 ACCEL Featherweight Championship
- RISE
  - 2019 RISE Lightweight (-63 kg) Championship
  - 2020 RISE Dead or Alive Lightweight (-63 kg) Tournament winner
  - 2026 Glory RISE Last Featherweight Standing Tournament winner
- International Sport Kickboxing Association
  - 2023 ISKA K-1 World Light Welterweight (-65 kg) Championship

Amateur

- Shin Karate
  - 2008 Shin Karate K-4 Gaora Cup Elementary School third place
  - 2009 Shin Karate K-4 Gaora Cup Elementary School Champion
  - 2010 Shin Karate West Japan K-4 Tournament Elementary School Champion
  - 2011 Shin Karate K-3 Gaora Cup Middle School Champion
  - 2017 Amateur Dageki Kakutougi Japan Cup -57.5 kg Champion
- All Japan Glove Karate Federation
  - 2010 All Japan Glove Karate Federation Elementary School third place
  - 2011 All Japan Glove Karate Federation Middle School Lightweight Champion
  - 2012 All Japan Glove Karate Federation Middle School Lightweight Champion & Event MVP
- Point & K.O. Karate Association
  - 2014 All Japan Karate Point & KO Rules Middle School Lightweight winner

=== Awards ===
- eFight.jp
  - 2x eFight Fighter of the Month (January 2020, March 2021)

== Kickboxing record ==
Professional kickboxing record
31 wins (18 (T)KOs), 6 losses, 1 draw, 0 no contests
Date	Result	Opponent	Event	Location	Method	Round	Time
2026-12-20		(Colombia) Anderson Cano Perez	RISE World Series 2026 Tokyo Final	Tokyo, Japan			
For the vacant RISE Super Lightweight (-65 kg) World Championship.
2026-06-06	Win	(Thailand) Petpanomrung Kiatmuu9	RISE World Series 2026 Tokyo - Last Featherweight Standing Final	Tokyo, Japan	Ext.R decision (unanimous)	4	3:00
Wins the Glory RISE Last Featherweight Standing Tournament.
2026-06-06	Win	(Japan) YURA	RISE World Series 2026 Tokyo - Last Featherweight Standing Semifinals	Tokyo, Japan	Decision (unanimous)	3	3:00
2026-03-28	Win	(Japan) Hiroki Kasahara	RISE ELDORADO 2026 - Last Featherweight Standing Quarterfinals	Tokyo, Japan	Decision (unanimous)	3	3:00
2025-11-02	Win	(Moldova) Petru Morari	RISE World Series 2025 Final - Last Featherweight Standing Second Round	Tokyo, Japan	TKO (3 knockdowns)	1	2:51
2025-08-02	Loss	(Australia) Chadd Collins	RISE WORLD SERIES 2025 Tokyo	Tokyo, Japan	Decision (split)	5	3:00
For the RISE Super Lightweight (-65kg) World title.
2025-03-29	Win	(South Korea) Lee Sung-hyun	RISE ELDORADO 2025	Tokyo, Japan	Decision (unanimous)	3	3:00
2024-12-21	Loss	(Portugal) Miguel Trindade	GLORY RISE Featherweight Grand Prix, Quarterfinals	Chiba, Japan	KO (right cross)	1	2:59
2024-07-20	Loss	(Thailand) Petpanomrung Kiatmuu9	Glory 93	Rotterdam, Netherlands	Decision (unanimous)	5	3:00
For the Glory Featherweight Championship.
2023-12-16	Win	(Mexico) Abraham Vidales	RISE WORLD SERIES 2023 - Final Round	Tokyo, Japan	KO (right cross)	2	1:49
2023-07-02	Win	(Uzbekistan) Anvar Boynazarov	RISE WORLD SERIES 2023 - 1st Round	Osaka, Japan	KO (body kick)	1	1:30
2023-03-26	Win	(France) Jérémy Monteiro	RISE ELDORADO 2023	Tokyo, Japan	TKO (high kick + punches)	4	1:45
Wins the vacant ISKA K-1 World light-welterweight (-65kg) title.
2022-12-25	Win	(Ukraine) Serhiy Adamchuk	RISE WORLD SERIES / Glory Rivals 4	Tokyo, Japan	Decision (unanimous)	3	3:00
2022-08-21	Loss	(Thailand) Petpanomrung Kiatmuu9	RISE WORLD SERIES OSAKA 2022	Osaka, Japan	Ext.R decision (unanimous)	6	3:00
For the inaugural RISE Super Lightweight (-65kg) World title.
2022-06-19	Win	(Japan) Hideaki Yamazaki	THE MATCH 2022	Tokyo, Japan	TKO (ref. stoppage/punches)	2	0:33
2022-04-02	Win	(Thailand) Lompetch Y'zdgym	RISE ELDORADO 2022	Tokyo, Japan	TKO (3 knockdowns)	1	1:56
2021-11-14	Loss	(Thailand) Petpanomrung Kiatmuu9	RISE World Series 2021 Osaka 2	Osaka, Japan	Decision (unanimous)	3	3:00
2021-09-23	Win	(Thailand) Tapruwan Hadesworkout	RISE WORLD SERIES 2021 Yokohama	Yokohama, Japan	TKO (punches)	3	1:35
2021-02-28	Win	(Japan) Taiju Shiratori	RISE Eldorado 2021	Yokohama, Japan	Decision (unanimous)	3	3:00
2020-10-11	Win	(Japan) Naoki Tanaka	RISE DEAD OR ALIVE 2020 Yokohama, Final	Yokohama, Japan	KO (right hook)	1	2:54
Wins RISE Dead or Alive -63kg Tournament title.
2020-10-11	Win	(Japan) Renta Nishioka	RISE DEAD OR ALIVE 2020 Yokohama, Semi Final	Yokohama, Japan	Decision (unanimous)	3	3:00
2020-08-10	Win	(Japan) Taiga	Rizin 23 – Yokohama	Yokohama, Japan	KO (punches)	1	2:50
2020-07-12	Win	(Brazil) Vitor Tofanelli	RISE on Abema	Tokyo, Japan	Decision (unanimous)	3	3:00
2020-01-13	Win	(Japan) Hideki	RISE 136	Tokyo, Japan	KO (right hook)	1	2:23
Wins the RISE Lightweight (-63kg) title.
2019-11-17	Win	(Japan) Yosuke Morii	Japan Kickboxing Innovation	Okayama, Japan	TKO (ref. stoppage/punches)	3	0:34
2019-09-16	Win	(Korea) Chan Hyung Lee	RISE World Series 2019 Final Round	Chiba, Japan	Decision (unanimous)	3	3:00
2019-07-21	Win	(China) Lu Jun	RISE World Series 2019, Semi Final	Osaka, Japan	KO (punches)	1	1:05
2019-05-19	Win	(Japan) Tomohiro Kitai	RISE 132	Tokyo, Japan	Decision (unanimous)	3	3:00
2019-03-10	Win	(Spain) Miguel Martinez	RISE World Series 2019, First Round	Tokyo, Japan	KO (left body kick)	1	0:25
2018-09-30	Draw	(Japan) Taiga	Rizin 13 - Saitama	Saitama, Japan	Decision	3	3:00
2018-07-28	Win	(Japan) Chibita	ACCEL vol.40	Kobe, Japan	KO (left middle kick)	1	1:30
Defended the ACCEL Featherweight title.
2018-06-16	Win	(Japan) Shuto Miyazaki	RISE 125, Road to RIZIN Tournament, Final	Chiba, Japan	Decision (unanimous)	3	3:00
2018-06-16	Win	(Japan) Momotaro	RISE 125, Road to RIZIN Tournament, Semi Final	Chiba, Japan	Decision (unanimous)	3	3:00
2018-05-03	Win	(Bolivia) Henry Cejas	ACCEL vol.39	Kobe, Japan	KO (jumping switch kick)	3	2:59
2018-03-24	Win	(Japan) Jun Aiolos	RISE 123	Tokyo, Japan	TKO (corner stoppage)	2	1:06
2017-12-24	Win	(Japan) Shogo Kuriaki	ACCEL vol.38	Kobe, Japan	Decision (unanimous)	3	3:00
Defended the ACCEL Featherweight title.
2017-11-23	Loss	(Japan) Taiki Naito	RISE 121 - DEAD or ALIVE 57 kg Tournament, Quarter Final	Tokyo, Japan	Ext.R decision (unanimous)	4	3:00
2017-08-12	Win	(Japan) Fumihiro Uesugi	ACCEL vol.37	Kobe, Japan	KO (3 knockdowns)	2	2:22
Wins the ACCEL Featherweight title.
2017-06-04	Win	(Japan) Shiro Kajihara	All Boxing World 10th	Osaka, Japan	TKO (punches & kicks)	3	
Legend: Win Loss Draw/no contest Notes

Amateur kickboxing record
Date	Result	Opponent	Event	Location	Method	Round	Time
2017-10-09	Win	(Japan) Tokio Yachuda	Dageki Kakutougi Japan Cup, Final	Tokyo, Japan	KO (punches)	1	
Wins 2017 Japan Cup -57kg title.
2017-10-09	Win	(Japan) Ren Sugiyama	Dageki Kakutougi Japan Cup, Semifinals	Tokyo, Japan	Decision		
Legend: Win Loss Draw/no contest Notes

== Professional boxing record ==
Key to abbreviations used for results
DQ	Disqualification	RTD	Corner retirement
KO	Knockout	SD	Split decision / split draw
MD	Majority decision / majority draw	TD	Technical decision / technical draw
NC	No contest	TKO	Technical knockout
PTS	Points decision	UD	Unanimous decision / unanimous draw

Boxing record
No.	Result	Record	Opponent	Type	Round(s)	Time	Date	Location	Notes
5	Loss	4–1	(Japan) Tatsuya Terada	MD	4 (4)		18 July 2016	Incubation Center, Amagasaki, Japan	West Japan Rookie of the Year Semifinals
4	Win	4–0	(Japan) Akito Terada	KO	2 (4)		8 May 2016	Bunka Center, Sanda, Japan	West Japan Rookie of the Year Quarterfinals
3	Win	3–0	(Japan) Kazuki Kimura	KO	4 (4)		27 December 2015	Bunka Center, Sanda, Japan	
2	Win	2–0	(Japan) Yuki Sueyoshi	UD	4 (4)		23 August 2015	Art Center, Kobe, Japan	
1	Win	1–0	(Japan) Kazuhiro Hirahara	UD	4 (4)		7 June 2015	Bunka Center, Sanda, Japan	

== See also ==
- List of male kickboxers
