= Chadd Collins =

Australian Muay Thai fighter and kickboxer

- Born: Chadd William James; 9 June 1995 (age 31); Caboolture, Queensland, Australia
- Other names: Shark Tor.Sangtiennoi
- Nickname: The Shark; Rattles; Mr. Mojo Risin; White Shark (ฉลามขาว)
- Height: 179 cm (5 ft 10 in)
- Division: Super Lightweight; Super Lightweight (RISE); Welterweight; Super Welterweight
- Style: Muay Thai (Muay Bouk); Kickboxing
- Stance: Orthodox
- Fighting out of: Queensland, Australia; Bangkok, Thailand
- Team: Strikeforce Muay Thai Gym; 350 Fitness (former)
- Trainer: Mark Pease; Clayton Collyer (former)

Kickboxing record
- Total: 76
- Wins: 54
- By knockout: 22
- Losses: 20
- By knockout: 3
- Draws: 2

Chadd "The Shark" Collins is an Australian professional Muay Thai fighter and kickboxer. He is the current Unified World Muay Thai Super Lightweight Champion, holding the WBC, WMC, and WMO World titles. As of October 2024, he is the #1 ranked Super Lightweight Muay Thai fighter in the world according to Combat Press and the current RISE Super Lightweight Champion. According to Beyond Kickboxing, Collins is the #4 ranked Super Featherweight kickboxer in the world.

== Professional career ==
Collin's professional career started with a scheduled match during the Nemesis XI event at Kingsway Stadium on Saturday, May 21, 2016, where Collins defeated Parviz Iskenderov for the WKN Australia title.

Over the course of the next three years, before his WBC Muaythai and WMC title challenges, Collins achieved notable victories over the two weight Lumpini Stadium champion Pongsiri P.K.Saenchaimuaythaigym, Kaito Ono and the former RISE and REBELS champion Fukashi Mizutani.

In June 2019, Collins fought Luis Cajaiba for the vacant WBC Muaythai Super Welterweight title. Cajaiba won the fight by decision.

In September 2019, Collins challenged Satanfah Rachanon for the WBC Muay Thai World World Welterweight title. He lost the fight by decision. He bounced back with a decision win over Avatar Tor.Morsri during MX Muay Xtreme.

He fought Bobo Sacko for the vacant WMC World Welterweight title in December 2019. Sacko won the fight by decision.

On November 26, 2022, Collins faced Yod-IQ Sor.Thanaphet at Rebellion Muay Thai XXVII with the vacant WBC Muay Thai World Super Lightweight title at stake. He won the fight by unanimous decision.

Collins made his first WBC Muay Thai World Super Lightweight (-63.5 kg) title, while simultaneously challenging for the inaugural Rebellion Muay Thai Super Lightweight title, against Jordan Godtfredsen at Rebellion Muaythai XXX on 18 November 2023. He won the fight by a fourth-round knockout.

On 16 December 2023, Collins faced Petpanomrung Kiatmuu9 for the RISE Super Lightweight Championship at RISE World Series 2023 Final Round. He won the fight by unanimous decision to become the new RISE Super Lightweight Champion in a fight that was named 2023 Upset of the Year by Beyond Kickboxing.

Collins faced Miguel Trindade at RISE ELDORADO 2024 on 17 March 2024 as part of an ongoing collaboration between the Glory and RISE organizations. He lost by first-round technical knockout after being counted three times by the referee.

Collins faced Rungkit Bor.Rungrot for the vacant WMO World Super Lightweight (-63.5 kg) title at War on the Shore 24 on 29 June 2024. He won the fight by a second-round knockout.

Collins faced Yutaro Asahi at RISE WORLD SERIES 2024 YOKOHAMA on 8 September 2024. He won the fight by a first-round knockout.

Collins faced Abraham Vidales in the quarterfinals of the GLORY RISE Featherweight Grand Prix, held on 21 December 2024, in Chiba, Japan. He won the fight by unanimous decision. Collins failed to advance in the tournament however, as he was stopped by Miguel Trindade in the first round of their semifinal bout.

Collins was scheduled to defend his RISE Super Lightweight (-65kg) World champion against Kento Haraguchi at RISE World Series 2025 Tokyo on 2 August 2025. He won the fight by split decision.

== Titles and accomplishments ==
=== Kickboxing ===
- RISE
  - 2023 RISE Super Lightweight (-65 kg) World Champion (one time; current)
    - One successful title defense

=== Muay Thai ===
- Eruption Muay Thai
  - 2014 Eruption 65 kg Champion
- World Kickboxing Network
  - 2016 WKN Muay Thai Australia Champion
- Rebellion Muay Thai
  - 2023 Rebellion Muay Thai Super Lightweight Champion
- World Muay Thai Council
  - 2022 WMC International Super Lightweight Champion
  - 2023 WMC World Super-Lightweight (-63.5 kg) Champion
    - One successful title defense
- World Boxing Council Muay Thai
  - 2015 WBC Muay Thai Queensland Super-Lightweight (-63.5 kg) Champion
  - 2022 WBC Muay Thai World Super-Lightweight (-63.5 kg) Champion
    - One successful title defense
- World Muaythai organization
  - 2024 WMO World Super Lightweight (-63.5 kg) Champion

== Fight record ==
Professional Muay Thai & Kickboxing record
54 Wins (22 KOs), 20 Losses, 2 Draws
Date	Result	Opponent	Event	Location	Method	Round	Time
2026-11-15	Win	(Japan) Kyohei Furumura	KNOCK OUT.70	Tokyo, Japan	TKO (referee stoppage)	3	0:03
2026-09-05	Loss	(Thailand) Kongnapa Weerasakreck	KNOCK OUT.68 ～KNOCKIN' on the WORLD～	Yokohama, Japan	Decision (Unanimous)	3	3:00
2026-06-06	Win	(Thailand) Kimluay WanKongOhm	RISE World Series 2026 Tokyo	Tokyo, Japan	Decision (Majority)	3	3:00
2026-04-18	Loss	(Thailand) Dam Parunchai	Rajadamnern World Series, Rajadamnern Stadium	Bangkok, Thailand	Decision (Unanimous)	5	3:00
For the Rajadamnern Stadium Super Lightweight (140 lbs) title.
2025-08-23	Win	(Thailand) Jack Rachanon	Infliction Fight Series 37	Gold Coast, Australia	Decision (Unanimous)	5	3:00
Defends the WMC World Super Lightweight (-63.5kg) title.
2025-08-02	Win	(Japan) Kento Haraguchi	RISE WORLD SERIES 2025 Tokyo	Tokyo, Japan	Decision (Split)	5	3:00
Defends the RISE Super Lightweight (-65kg) World title.
2024-12-21	Loss	(Portugal) Miguel Trindade	GLORY RISE Featherweight Grand Prix, Semifinals	Chiba, Japan	TKO (2 Knockdowns)	1	1:02
2024-12-21	Win	(Mexico) Abraham Vidales	GLORY RISE Featherweight Grand Prix, Quarterfinals	Chiba, Japan	Decision (Unanimous)	3	3:00
2024-09-08	Win	(Japan) Yutaro Asahi	RISE WORLD SERIES 2024 Yokohama	Yokohama, Japan	KO (Right cross)	1	2:22
2024-06-29	Win	(Thailand) Rungkit Bor.Rungrot	War on the Shore 24	Gold Coast, Australia	KO	2	
Wins the vacant WMO World Super Lightweight (-63.5kg) title.
2024-03-17	Loss	(Portugal) Miguel Trindade	RISE ELDORADO 2024	Tokyo, Japan	TKO (3 Knockdowns)	1	1:35
2024-02-16	Win	(Morocco) Mohamed El Hammouti	AFS: Australia vs The World	Dubai, United Arab Emirates	Decision (Unanimous)	3	3:00
2023-12-16	Win	(Thailand) Petpanomrung Kiatmuu9	RISE World Series 2023 - Final Round	Tokyo, Japan	Decision (Unanimous)	5	3:00
Wins the RISE Super Lightweight (-65kg) World title.
2023-11-18	Win	(Australia) Jordan Godtfredsen	Rebellion Muaythai XXX // Roots 24: Welcome to Jamrock	Melbourne, Australia	KO (Spinning back fist)	4	
Wins the inaugural Rebellion Muay Thai Super Lightweight title and defends the WBC Muay Thai World Super Lightweight (-63.5kg) title.
2023-08-26	Win	(South Korea) Cho Kyeong Jae	RISE World Series 2023 - 2nd Round	Tokyo, Japan	KO (High kick)	1	2:17
2023-05-14	Win	(Thailand) Ratchasing PetchyindeeAcademy	HOOST CUP - Kickboxing World Cup in Japan	Tokyo, Japan	Ext.R Decision (Majority)	4	3:00
2023-03-25	Win	(Thailand) Fah Likit Lukmahathat	Infliction Fight Series	Carrara, Australia	KO (Punches)	2	
Wins the vacant WMC World Super Lightweight (-63.5kg) title.
2022-12-25	Win	(Japan) Hiroki Kasahara	RISE World Series - Glory Rivals 4	Tokyo, Japan	Decision (Unanimous)	3	3:00
2022-11-26	Win	(Thailand) Yod-IQ Sor.Thanaphet	Rebellion Muay Thai XXVII	Melbourne, Australia	Decision (Unanimous)	5	3:00
Wins the vacant WBC Muay Thai World Super Lightweight (-63.5kg) title.
2022-10-15	Win	(Japan) Naoki	RISE WORLD SERIES 2022	Tokyo, Japan	KO (Punches)	2	1:42
2022-08-21	Win	(Japan) Ryota Nakano	RISE WORLD SERIES OSAKA 2022	Osaka, Japan	KO (Punches)	1	2:43
2022-07-16	Win	(Thailand) Luktum WinnerMuaythai	Infliction Fight Series	Gold Coast, Australia	Decision (Unanimous)	5	3:00
Wins WMC International Super Lightweight title.
2022-05-28	Loss	(Thailand) Jack SorKor.NidKlongsamwa	Fairtex Fight, Lumpinee Stadium	Bangkok, Thailand	Decision	3	3:00
2021-11-27	Win	(Australia) Quinton Smith	The Road To Retribution	Gold Coast, Australia	Decision (Unanimous)	5	3:00
Wins FWC Welterweight title.
2021-10-30	Win	(Australia) Rhys Karakyriacos	Infliction Muay Thai	Sydney, Australia	Decision (Unanimous)	5	3:00
2021-07-17	Win	(Australia) Ramesh Habib	Infliction Muay Thai	Queensland, Australia	TKO (Doctor Stoppage)	3	
2019-12-14	Loss	(France) Bobo Sacko	Golden Fight	Paris, France	Decision	5	3:00
For the vacant WMC World 147 lbs title.
2019-10-27	Win	(Thailand) Avatar Tor.Morsri	MX MUAY XTREME	Bangkok, Thailand	Decision	3	3:00
2019-09-09	Loss	(Thailand) Satanfah Rachanon	Lumpinee Stadium	Bangkok, Thailand	Decision	5	3:00
For the vacant WBC Muay Thai World 154 lbs title.
2019-06-18	Loss	(Brazil) Luis Cajaiba	Petchnumnoi + Prestige Fight Lumpinee Stadium	Bangkok, Thailand	Decision	5	3:00
For the vacant WBC Muay Thai World 147 lbs title.
2019-04-27	Win	(Japan) Kaito	Shoot Boxing 2019 act.2	Tokyo, Japan	Decision (Unanimous)	5	3:00
2019-02-11	Win	(Japan) Fukashi	Knock Out 2019 Winter The Answer Is in the Ring	Tokyo, Japan	Decision (Unanimous)	5	3:00
2018-12-01	Draw	(France) Azize Hlali	Credissimo Golden Fight	Levallois Perret, France	Decision	5	3:00
2018-10-28	Win	(Thailand) Pongsiri P.K.Saenchaimuaythaigym	Topking World Series	Ratchaburi province, Thailand	Decision	3	3:00
2018-09-27	Loss	(Thailand) Phonek Or.Kwanmuang	Sor. Sommai Rajadamnern Stadium	Bangkok, Thailand	Decision	5	3:00
2018-08-23	Win	(Thailand) Sakmongkol Sor. Sommai	Rajadamnern Stadium	Bangkok, Thailand	KO (Uppercut)	3	
2018-07-25	Loss	(Thailand) Phonek Or.Kwanmuang	Rajadamnern Stadium	Bangkok, Thailand	Decision	5	3:00
2017-09-11	Win	(Thailand) Sakmongkol Sor.Sommai	Rajadamnern Stadium	Bangkok, Thailand	KO (Left elbow)	3	
2017-08-07	Win	(Thailand) Saeksan Or. Kwanmuang	Rajadamnern Stadium	Bangkok, Thailand	Decision	5	3:00
2017-07-15	Loss	(Thailand) Saenchai P.K.Saenchaimuaythaigym	Thai Fight: We Love Yala	Yala province, Thailand	Decision	3	3:00
2017-04-29	Loss	(Thailand) Manasak Sor.Jor.Lekmuangnon	THAI FIGHT Samui 2017	Ko Samui, Thailand	Decision	3	3:00
2017-04-08	Loss	(Thailand) Talaytong Sor.Thanaphet	Lumpinee Stadium	Bangkok, Thailand	Decision	5	3:00
2017-02-17	Win	(Thailand) Lampard Sor Kamsing	MX Muay Xtreme	Bangkok, Thailand	KO (Body punch)	3	
2016-12-23	Win	(Thailand) Pakorn PKSaenchaimuaythaigym	MX Muay Xtreme	Bangkok, Thailand	Decision	5	3:00
2016-10-15	Win	(Australia) Alexi Petroulias	Prestige Fight Series 4	Moolap, Australia	Decision (Unanimous)	5	3:00
2016-09-03	Loss	(Thailand) Rock Sakonchai (Thailand) Apirak Sitmonchai	Corporate Punishment 3 - Tag Team Muay Thai	Brisbane, Australia	Decision (Unanimous)	5	3:00
For the Tag Team Muay Thai title. Collins was relayed by Beniah Douma.
2016-07-24	Win	(Thailand) Petchmeechai Petchcharoen	MAX Muay Thai	Pattaya, Thailand	KO (High kick)	2	
2016-06-26	Draw	(Thailand) Yodpetch Petchrungruang	MAX Muay Thai	Pattaya, Thailand	Decision	3	3:00
2016-05-21	Win	(Belarus) Parviz Iskenderov	Nemesis XI	Perth, Australia	Decision (Unanimous)	5	3:00
Wins the vacant WKN Muay Thai Australia title.
2016-04-16	Loss	(Sweden) Samuel Bark	Prestige Fight Series 3	Moolap, Australia	Decision	5	3:00
2015-11-21	Loss	(Thailand) Singpayak Mor.RachabatChombueng	Prestige Fight Series 2	Geelong, Australia	Decision (Majority)	5	3:00
2015-10-31	Win	(Australia) Kurtis Staiti	Destiny 5	Mansfield, Australia	Decision (Split)	5	3:00
Wins the WBC Muay Thai Queensland Super Lightweight title.
2015-09-19	Loss	(Thailand) Apisit KemMuayThai	Corporate Punishment	Brisbane, Australia	KO (Elbow)	2	
2015-08-28	Win	(Australia) Glen Purvis	J.N.I Promotions 100	Hurstville, Australia			
2015-03-20	Loss	(Australia) Roy Wills	Road To Rebellion IV	Balaclava, Australia	Decision (Split)	5	3:00
2014-12-13	Win	(Australia) Brent Dames	King of Kombat 14	Melbourne, Australia	Decision	5	3:00
2014-11-22	Win	(Papua New Guinea) Jonathan Tuhu	Legacy Muay Thai 3	Brisbane, Australia	Decision (Unanimous)	5	3:00
2014-10-03	Win	(Australia) Beniah Douma	Eruption 10	Mansfield, Australia	Decision	5	3:00
Wins the Eruption 65kg title.
2014-08-02	Loss	(Thailand) Rock Sakonchai	Preacher Fight Night	Brisbane, Australia	Decision	5	3:00
2014-06-07	Win	(Australia) Yoshi Ueda	Rumble at the Ridge XI, Final	Brisbane, Australia			
2014-06-07	Win	(Australia) Jimmy Irwin	Rumble at the Ridge XI, Semifinals	Brisbane, Australia			
2014-01-05	Win	(Thailand) Cartoon Sumalee	Sunday Championship Night, Bangla Stadium	Patong, Thailand	TKO (Referee stoppage)	4	
2013-12-27	Win	(Thailand)	Bangla Stadium	Patong, Thailand	KO (High kick)		
2013-11-30	Win	(Australia) Wayne Martin	Destiny 1	Brisbane, Australia	TKO	5	
2013-03-09	Win	(Australia) Paymaan Shahrokhey	Total Carnage III	Gold Coast, Australia			
2013-02-15	Win	(Thailand)	Bangla Stadium	Patong, Thailand	KO (Left hook)	2	
2012-11-17	Win	(Australia) Tim Appleton	Carnage at the Colosseum 3	Shepparton, Australia	Decision (Unanimous)	5	2:00
Defends the ISKA Muay Thai Queensland State Light welterweight title.
2012-08-25	Win	(Australia) Tim Appleton	Adrenalin 3.0	Redcliffe, Australia			
2012-08-18	Win	(Australia) Richard Fanous	KO Promotions #20	Shepparton, Australia	Decision (Unnimaous)	5	2:00
Legend: Win Loss Draw/No contest Notes

Amateur Muay Thai record
Date	Result	Opponent	Event	Location	Method	Round	Time
2014-05-	Loss	(Sweden) Karl Axelsson	2014 IFMA World Championships, 1/8 Finals	Langkawi, Malaysia	Decision	3	3:00
Legend: Win Loss Draw/No contest Notes

== See also ==
- List of male kickboxers
