= Hiroki Kasahara (kickboxer) =

Japanese kickboxer (born 1999)

- Born: 笠原 弘希; August 10, 1999 (age 27); Tokyo, Japan
- Height: 174 cm (5 ft 9 in)
- Weight: 65 kg (143 lb; 10.2 st)
- Division: Super Featherweight; Lightweight; Super Lightweight
- Reach: 172.5 cm (68 in)
- Style: Shootboxing
- Stance: Orthodox
- Fighting out of: Tokyo, Japan
- Team: Caesar Gym
- Years active: 2015–present

Kickboxing record
- Total: 51
- Wins: 41
- By knockout: 17
- Losses: 10
- By knockout: 3

Other information
- Notable relatives: Yuki Kasahara (younger brother)

Hiroki Kasahara (Japanese: 笠原 弘希, Kasahara Hiroki; born August 10, 1999) is a Japanese kickboxer, currently competing in the lightweight division of Shootboxing. He is a three-weight Shootboxing champion, having held titles at featherweight (-57.5 kg), super featherweight (-60 kg) and lightweight (-62.5 kg).

As of October 2022, Beyond Kick ranks him as the tenth best featherweight kickboxer in the world.

== Kickboxing career ==
=== Featherweight ===
Kasahara made his professional debut against Genki Takeno at SHOOT BOXING2015～SB30th Anniversary～ act.3 on June 21, 2015. He won the fight by unanimous decision. Kasahara would amass a 9–0 record during the next year, before suffering a stoppage loss at the hands of Shogo Kuriaki at REBELS.46 on October 23, 2016.

Kasahara faced Kenichi TencloberGym at SHOOT BOXING 2017 act.1 on February 11, 2017. He won the fight by unanimous decision. He would add two more decision victories to his record that year, as he was able to beat Yuuichi at SHOOT BOXING 2017 act.2 on April 8, and Genki at SHOOT BOXING 2017 act.3 on June 16. Kasahara avenged his first professional loss to Shogo Kuriaki at SHOOT BOXING 2017 act.4 on September 16, 2017, as he was able to knock Kuriaki out with a left hook to the body at the 2:15 minute mark of the third round. His winning streak was snapped by Kazuki Fukada at SHOOT BOXING BATTLE SUMMIT-GROUND ZERO TOKYO 2017 on November 22, 2017, who beat him by split decision, after an extra fourth round was fought.

Kasahara faced Yuta Hamamoto at Shoot Boxing 2018 act.1 on February 10, 2018. He won the fight by unanimous decision. Kasahara next faced Naoya at Shoot Boxing 2018 act.3 on June 10, 2018. He knocked Naoya out with a head kick at the 2:26 minute mark of the opening frame.

His 15–2 record earned Kasahara the chance to challenge the reigning Shootboxing Japan featherweight (-57.5 kg) champion Genki at Shoot Boxing 2018 act.4 on September 15, 2018. He captured his first professional title by unanimous decision.

Kasahara faced Kohei "MOMOTARO" Kodera in a non-title bout at SHOOT BOXING S-Cup 65 kg World Tournament 2018 on November 18, 2018. Kodera handed Kasahara his third professional loss, as he won the fight by unanimous decision. Kasahara faced Yukinori Ogasawara in another non-title bout at Shoot Boxing 2019 act.2 on April 27, 2019. He won the fight by unanimous decision.

=== Super featherweight ===
Following his rebounded victory over Ogasawara, Kasahara had his first fight at the super featherweight (-60 kg) limit, as he was booked to face the former SHOOT BOXING Japan Super bantamweight champion Taiki Naito at Shoot Boxing 2019 act.3 on June 23, 2019. He won the fight by majority decision, after two additional rounds were contested.

Kasahara challenged the reigning Shootboxing Japan super featherweight (-60 kg) champion Kazuki Fukada at Shoot Boxing 2019 act.4 on September 29, 2019. He won the fight by a second-round technical knockout, after he had knocked Fukuda down three times by the 1:24 minute mark of the round.

Kasahara's three-fight winning streak was stopped by Yota Shigemori, who beat him by a fourth-round technical knockout at Shoot Boxing: Ground Zero 2019 on December 3, 2019. Kasahara was able to rebounded from the fourth loss of his professional career with a third-round technical knockout of Taisuke Maeguchi at Shoot Boxing 2020 act.1 on February 15, 2020.

=== Lightweight ===
Following a nine-month break in competition, forced on him by the COVID-19 pandemic, Kasahara moved up to lightweight (-62.5 kg). He faced Hiroyuki Oshiro in his divisional debut at Shoot Boxing 2020 act.2 on November 28, 2020. He won the fight by a narrowly contested unanimous decision.

Kasahara faced the former REBELS lightweight and super lightweight champion Suarek Rukkukamui at Shoot Boxing 2021 act.1 on February 7, 2021. He won the fight by a second-round technical knockout, forcing Suarek's corner to throw in the towel at the 2:18 minute mark.

Kasahara faced Kyohei Furumura at Shoot Boxing 2021 act.3 on June 20, 2021. He won the fight by unanimous decision. Kasahara next faced Paranrak at Shoot Boxing 2021 act.4 on September 4, 2021. He stopped the Thai with a left hook to the body in the final minute of the opening round. Kasahara faced Yota Shigemori at Shoot Boxing 2021 Champion Carnival on December 26, 2021, in his fourth and final bout of the year. He won the fight by unanimous decision.

Kasahara challenged the Shootboxing Japan Lightweight (-62.5 kg) champion Renta Nishioka at Shoot Boxing 2022 act.2 on April 10, 2022. He won the fight by a second-round stoppage, flooring Nishioka with a right hook.

Kasahara faced the KNOCK OUT Black Lightweight champion Bazooka Koki at Shoot Boxing 2022 act.3 on June 26, 2022. He won the fight by a third-round technical knockout. The ringside physician stopped the fight 41 seconds into the round, due to a cut above Koki's left eye.

Kasahara made his Rizin FF debut against Yusaku Ishizuki at Rizin 37 - Saitama on July 31, 2021. He won the fight by unanimous decision.

Kasahara faced Lompetch Y'zdgym at Shoot Boxing 2022 act.4 on July 19, 2022. He won the fight by unanimous decision.

Kasahara faced the three-time WBC Muay Thai World title challenger Chadd Collins at RISE WORLD SERIES / SHOOTBOXING-KINGS on December 25, 2022. He lost the fight by unanimous decision, with scores of 30–29, 30–28 and 30–27.

=== Super lightweight ===
Kasahara was expected to face Anurak Tded99 in a super lightweight (-65 kg) bout at SHOOT BOXING 2023 act.1 on February 12, 2023. Anurak withdrew from the bout on February 3, after suffering a cut, and was replaced by the 2021 Sports Authority of Thailand Fighter of the Year Lamnamoonlek Tded99. Kasahara won the fight by unanimous decision, after three extension rounds were contested.

Kasahara faced the former Lumpinee Stadium lightweight and Rajadamnern Stadium welterweight champion Rambo Mor Rattanabandit in an open-finger glove bout at SHOOT BOXING 2023 act.2 on April 30, 2023. He won the fight by unanimous decision, with two scorecards of 30–28 and one scorecard of 30–29.

Kasahara faced Nathan Dryden in an open-finger glove bout at SHOOT BOXING 2023 act.4 on September 23, 2023. He won the fight by a second-round front choke.

Kasahara faced Superball Tded99 at SHOOT BOXING 2023 Series Final on November 14, 2023. He won the fight by a first-round knockout.

Kasahara faced Weerapon Sor.Dechapan at ONE Friday Fights 53 on February 23, 2024. He lost the fight by unanimous decision.

Kasahara faced Yuya Hasegawa in an open-finger glove bout at SHOOT BOXING 2024 act.5 on October 13, 2024. He won the fight by a first-round technical knockout, after thrice knocking down Hasegawa by the 55 second mark of the bout.

Kasahara faced Jack Rachanon in an open-finger glove bout, with legal elbow strikes, at SHOOTBOXING GROUND ZERO TOKYO 2024 on December 26, 2024. He lost the fight by unanimous decision, after an extra fourth round was contested.

Kasahara faced Komkeaw Sit Por.Jorwo at SHOOT BOXING 2025 act.1 on February 8, 2025. He won the fight by a first-round knockout. After rebounding from his previous loss, Kasahara faced Jack Rachanon in a rematch at SHOOT BOXING 2025 act.2 on April 12, 2025. He won the fight by unanimous decision, after an extra fourth round was contested.

Kasahara faced Lomphet BeastGym in the opening round of the 2025 RISE Last Featherweight Standing tournament, held at RISE World Series 2025 Yokohama on June 21, 2025. He won the fight by unanimous decision, with three scorecards of 30—26 in his favor.

Kasahara challenged the SHOOT BOXING Japan Super Lightweight (65kg) champion Imoto Volcano at SHOOT BOXING 2025 act. on August 9, 2025. He lost the fight by a third-round technical knockout.

== Championships and accomplishments ==
=== Professional ===
- Shootboxing
  - 2018 Shootboxing Japan Featherweight (-57.5 kg) Championship
  - 2019 Shootboxing Japan Super Featherweight (-60 kg) Championship
  - 2022 Shootboxing Japan Lightweight (-62.5 kg) Championship
  - 2026 SHOOT BOXING Japan Super Lightweight (65kg) Championship

=== Amateur ===
- Shootboxing
  - 2011 All Japan Shoot Boxing Kids Upper Grade Champion
  - 2012 All Japan Shoot Boxing Kids Upper Grade Champion
  - 2013 All Japan Shoot Boxing Junior -55 kg Champion
  - 2014 All Japan Shoot Boxing Junior -60 kg Champion

== Fight record ==
Kickboxing and Shootboxing record
41 Wins (17 (T)KOs), 10 Losses
Date	Result	Opponent	Event	Location	Method	Round	Time
2026-10-24	Loss	(Azerbaijan) Zaur Mamedov	SHOOT BOXING 2026 act.5	Tokyo, Japan	Decision (Split)	3	3:00
2026-08-08	Win	(Japan) Ryuto Shiokawa	ONE Samurai 2	Tokyo, Japan	Decision (Split)	3	3:00
2026-06-21	Win	(Japan) Imoto Volcano	SHOOT BOXING 2026 act.3	Tokyo, Japan	2nd Ext.R Decision (Unanimous)	7	3:00
Wins the SHOOT BOXING Japan Super Lightweight (65kg) title.
2026-03-28	Loss	(Japan) Kento Haraguchi	RISE ELDORADO 2026 - Last Featherweight Standing Quarterfinals	Tokyo, Japan	Decision (Unanimous)	3	3:00
2026-02-14	Win	(South Korea) Lee Jun Hyeong	SHOOT BOXING 2026 act.1	Tokyo, Japan	TKO (3 Knockdowns)	2	1:19
2025-11-02	Win	(Japan) Taiju Shiratori	RISE World Series 2025 Final - Last Featherweight Standing Second Round	Tokyo, Japan	Ext.R Decision (Unanimous)	4	3:00
2025-08-09	Loss	(Japan) Imoto Volcano	SHOOT BOXING 2025 act.4	Tokyo, Japan	TKO (Referee stop./cut)	3	3:00
For the SHOOT BOXING Japan Super Lightweight (65kg) title.
2025-06-21	Win	(Thailand) Lomphet BeastGym	RISE World Series 2025 Yokohama - Last Featherweight Standing Opening Round	Yokohama, Japan	Decision (Unanimous)	3	3:00
2025-04-12	Win	(Thailand) Jack Rachanon	SHOOT BOXING 2025 act.2	Tokyo, Japan	Ext.R Decision (Unanimous)	4	3:00
2025-02-08	Win	(Thailand) Komkeaw Sit Por.Jorwo	SHOOT BOXING 2025 act.1	Tokyo, Japan	KO (Knee)	1	2:40
2024-12-26	Loss	(Thailand) Jack Rachanon	SHOOTBOXING GROUND ZERO TOKYO 2024	Tokyo, Japan	Ext.R Decision (Unanimous)	4	3:00
2024-10-13	Win	(Japan) Yuya Hasegawa	SHOOT BOXING 2024 act.5	Tokyo, Japan	TKO (3 Knockdowns)	1	0:55
2024-02-23	Loss	(Thailand) Worapon Sor.Dechapan	ONE Friday Fights 53, Lumpinee Stadium	Bangkok, Thailand	Decision (Unanimous)	3	3:00
2023-11-14	Win	(Thailand) Superball Tded99	SHOOT BOXING 2023 Series Final	Tokyo, Japan	KO (Left hook)	1	3:00
2023-09-23	Win	(United Kingdom) Nathan Dryden	SHOOT BOXING 2023 act.4	Tokyo, Japan	TKO (Front choke)	2	1:04
2023-04-30	Win	(Thailand) Rambo Mor Rattanabandit	SHOOT BOXING 2023 act.2	Tokyo, Japan	Decision (Unanimous)	3	3:00
2023-02-12	Win	(Thailand) Lamnamoonlek Tded99	SHOOT BOXING 2023 act.1	Tokyo, Japan	3rd Ext.R Decision (Unanimous)	6	3:00
2022-12-25	Loss	(Australia) Chadd Collins	RISE WORLD SERIES / SHOOTBOXING-KINGS 2022	Tokyo, Japan	Decision (Unanimous)	3	3:00
2022-09-17	Win	(Thailand) Lomphet Y'ZDGYM	SHOOT BOXING 2022 act.4	Tokyo, Japan	Decision (Unanimous)	3	3:00
2022-07-31	Win	(Japan) Yusaku Ishizuki	Rizin 37 - Saitama	Saitama, Japan	Decision (Unanimous)	3	3:00
2022-06-26	Win	(Japan) Bazooka Koki	SHOOT BOXING 2022 act.3	Tokyo, Japan	TKO (Doctor stoppage)	3	0:41
2022-04-10	Win	(Japan) Renta Nishioka	SHOOT BOXING 2022 act.2	Tokyo, Japan	KO (Left hook to the body)	2	1:24
Wins the SHOOT BOXING Japan Lightweight (62.5kg) title.
2021-12-26	Win	(Japan) Yota Shigemori	SHOOT BOXING 2021 Champion Carnival	Tokyo, Japan	Decision (Unanimous)	3	3:00
2021-09-04	Win	(Thailand) Paranglak FellowGym	SHOOT BOXING 2021 act.4	Tokyo, Japan	KO (Left hook to the body)	1	2:18
2021-06-20	Win	(Japan) Kyohei Furumura	SHOOT BOXING 2021 act.3	Tokyo, Japan	Decision (Unanimous)	3	3:00
2021-02-07	Win	(Thailand) Suarek Rukkukamui	SHOOT BOXING 2021 act.2	Tokyo, Japan	TKO (Corner stoppage)	2	2:18
2020-12-28	Win	(Japan) Hulk Oshiro	SHOOT BOXING 2020 act.2	Tokyo, Japan	Decision (Unanimous)	3	3:00
2020-02-15	Win	(Japan) Taison Maeguchi	SHOOT BOXING 2020 act.1	Tokyo, Japan	TKO (Doctor Stoppage)	3	1:14
2019-12-03	Loss	(Japan) Yota Shigemori	SHOOT BOXING GROUND ZERO TOKYO 2019	Tokyo, Japan	TKO (Doctor Stoppage)	4	2:34
2019-09-28	Win	(Japan) Kazuki Fukada	SHOOT BOXING 2019 act.4	Tokyo, Japan	TKO (3 Knockdowns)	2	1:42
Wins the SHOOT BOXING Japan Super Featherweight (60kg) title.
2019-06-23	Win	(Japan) Taiki Naito	SHOOT BOXING 2019 act.3	Tokyo, Japan	2nd Ext.R Decision (Majority)	5	3:00
2019-04-27	Win	(Japan) Yukinori Ogasawara	SHOOT BOXING 2019 act.2	Tokyo, Japan	Decision (Unanimous)	3	3:00
2018-11-18	Loss	(Japan) MOMOTARO	SHOOT BOXING S-cup 65 kg World TOURNAMENT 2018	Tokyo, Japan	Decision (Unanimous)	3	3:00
2018-09-15	Win	(Japan) Genki	SHOOT BOXING2018 act.4	Tokyo, Japan	Decision (Unanimous)	5	3:00
Wins the vacant SHOOT BOXING Japan Featherweight (57.5kg) title.
2018-06-10	Win	(Japan) Naoya	SHOOT BOXING 2018 act.3	Tokyo, Japan	KO (High kick)	1	2:26
2018-02-10	Win	(Japan) Yuudai Hamamoto	SHOOT BOXING 2018 act.1	Tokyo, Japan	Decision (Unanimous)	3	3:00
2017-11-22	Loss	(Japan) Kazuki Fukada	SHOOT BOXING BATTLE SUMMIT-GROUND ZERO TOKYO 2017	Tokyo, Japan	Ext.R Decision (Split)	4	3:00
2017-09-16	Win	(Japan) Shogo Kuriaki	SHOOT BOXING 2017 act.4	Tokyo, Japan	KO (Left hook to the body)	3	2:15
2017-06-16	Win	(Japan) Genki	SHOOT BOXING 2017 act.3	Tokyo, Japan	Decision (Unanimous)	3	3:00
2017-04-08	Win	(Japan) Yuuichi	SHOOT BOXING 2017 act.2	Tokyo, Japan	Decision (Unanimous)	3	3:00
2017-02-11	Win	(Japan) Kenichi TencloberGym	SHOOT BOXING 2017 act.1	Tokyo, Japan	Decision (Unanimous)	3	3:00
2016-10-23	Loss	(Japan) Shogo Kuriaki	REBELS.46	Tokyo, Japan	TKO (Punches)	2	1:31
2016-09-19	Win	(Japan) Yusuke Kitagawa	SHOOT BOXING 2016 act.4	Tokyo, Japan	TKO (Cornern stoppage)	3	1:58
2016-08-21	Win	(Japan) Yoshinobu Ozaki	SHOOTBOXING Young Cesar in Hanayashiki act.3	Tokyo, Japan	Decision (Unanimous)	3	3:00
2016-06-05	Win	(Japan) Atsushi Sakamura	SHOOT BOXING 2016 act.3	Tokyo, Japan	TKO	3	2:31
2016-04-16	Win	(Japan) Namiki Kawahara	SHOOT BOXING 2016 Young Cesar vol.1	Tokyo, Japan	Decision (Unanimous)	3	3:00
2016-02-13	Win	(Japan) Ryota Naito	SHOOT BOXING 2016 act.1	Tokyo, Japan	Decision (Unanimous)	3	3:00
2015-12-01	Win	(Japan) Yuai Kannaka	SHOOT BOXING 30th ANNIVERSARY GROUND ZERO TOKYO 2015	Tokyo, Japan	TKO	2	3:00
2015-09-19	Win	(Japan) Saiki Toboru	SHOOT BOXING2015～SB30th Anniversary～ act.4	Tokyo, Japan	Decision (Unanimous)	2	1:35
2015-08-22	Win	(Japan) Yugo	SHOOT BOXING 30th ANNIVERSARY CAESAR TIME!	Tokyo, Japan	Decision (Unanimous)	3	3:00
2015-06-21	Win	(Japan) Genki Takeno	SHOOT BOXING2015～SB30th Anniversary～ act.3	Tokyo, Japan	Decision (Unanimous)	3	3:00
Legend: Win Loss Draw/No contest Notes

=== Amateur record ===
Amateur Kickboxing record
Date	Result	Opponent	Event	Location	Method	Round	Time
2014-12-21	Win	(Japan) Ryoga Imoto	All Japan Amateur Shoot Boxing	Japan	TKO	1	
Wins Amateur Shoot Boxing All Japan -60kg title
2014-06-29	Loss	(Japan) Koudai Hirayama	SHOOT BOXING Amateur	Osaka, Japan	Decision	2	2:00
2014-04-20	Loss	(Japan) Renta Nishioka	Amateur SHOOT BOXING	Tokyo, Japan	Decision (Unanimous)	2	2:00
2014-02-09	Loss	(Japan) Ryoichi Hashimoto	SHOOT BOXING CENTRAL 9 ~Young Caesar Cup~	Nagoya, Japan	Decision (Unanimous)	2	2:00
2013-11-16	Win	(Japan) Gaku Sakamoto	Shootboxing GROUND ZERO TOKYO 2013, All Japan Amateur Shootboxing Final	Osaka, Japan	Decision (Unanimous)		
Wins All Japan Shootboxing Amateur -55kg title.
2013-10-13	Win	(Japan) Masahiro Osawa	SHOOT BOXING Amateur	Tokyo, Japan	Decision		
2013-02-10	Win	(Japan) Kenta Hattori	SHOOT BOXING Amateur	Tokyo, Japan	Decision (Unanimous)	2	1:00
2012-06-24	Loss	(Japan) Shohei Setoguchi	SHOOT BOXING Amateur	Tokyo, Japan	Ext.R Decision (Unanimous)	3	1:00
2012-02-22	Win	(Japan) Gaku Sakamoto	SHOOT BOXING Amateur	Osaka, Japan	Decision (Split)	2	2:00
2011-11-27	Win	(Japan) Kaku Niimi	SHOOT BOXING Amateur	Osaka, Japan	Decision (Majority)	2	2:00
2010-08-07	Loss	(Japan) Shohei Setoguchi	Young Caesar Cup Tokyo 2010	Tokyo, Japan	Decision (Unanimous)	1	2:00
Legend: Win Loss Draw/No contest Notes

== See also ==
- List of male kickboxers
