= Kosei Yamada =

Japanese kickboxer (born 1992)

- Born: 山田洸誓; 4 November 1992 (age 33); Niihama, Japan
- Other names: Karate Monster
- Nationality: Japanese
- Height: 1.70 m (5 ft 7 in)
- Weight: 65 kg (143 lb; 10 st 3 lb)
- Division: Featherweight
- Style: Seidokaikan, Kickboxing
- Fighting out of: Niihama, Japan
- Team: Seido Kaikan KCIEL
- Years active: 2016-2022

Kickboxing record
- Total: 18
- Wins: 15
- By knockout: 9
- Losses: 3
- By knockout: 0

Other information
- Website: http://kosei-yamada.com/

Kosei Yamada (山田洸誓; born 4 November 1992) is a retired Japanese kickboxer, who spent his entire professional career competing in the super lightweight division of RISE. He held the RISE Super Lightweight Championship from 2019 until 2022.

Between July and December 2021, he was ranked as a top ten featherweight kickboxer by Combat Press. He re-entered the rankings at #10 in April 2022, and remained ranked until July 2022.

== Personal life ==
Yamada was married to the former RISE ring girl Nayu Inoshita in 2020. The pair have a single child.

== Kickboxing career ==
=== RISE ===
Yamada made his RISE debut against Ryotaro Tamura at RISE 116, on 5 March 2017. He won the fight by a first-round knockout. This was followed up by second-round stoppages of Possible K at RISE 117 on 20 May 2017, and Taira Katsuki RISE 120 on 9 October 2017.

Yamada was scheduled to face Atsushi Ogata at RISE 122 on 4 February 2018. He won the fight by a first-round knockout, stopping his opponent with a left hook at the one-minute mark of the round.

Yamada fought Ichiyo Morimoto at RISE 124 on 25 May 2018. He won the fight by a third-round knockout, knocking Morimoto with a flying knee 35 seconds into the last round.

Yamada was scheduled to face Fumiya Kawashima at RISE 128 on 2 November 2018. He won the fight by a technical knockout, managing to knock Kawashima down three times in the first round.

Yamada was scheduled to fight Yukimitsu Takahashi at RISE 130 on 3 February 2019. He won the fight by majority decision, with scores of 30–29, 30-29 and 30-30.

Yamada was scheduled to face Tapruwan at RISE WORLD SERIES 2019 Semi-Final Round in OSAKA on 21 July 2019. He won the fight by unanimous decision, with scores of 28–29, 29-29, 28–29.

=== RISE Super Lightweight champion ===
==== Yamada vs. Yamaguchi ====
Yamada was scheduled to fight the former Japan Innovation Lightweight Champion for the vacant RISE Super Lightweight title at RISE 134 on 29 September 2019. At the time the bout was booked, Yamada was the #1 ranked RISE Super Lightweight contender, while Yamaguchi was the #2 ranked contender.

Yamada scored the first knockdown of the fight with a left hook near the end of the first round. Yamaguchi managed to beat the eight-count, and was spared any further damage by the round ending. Yamada scored two more knockdowns in the second round, the first one as a result of a right hook, while the second was the result of a left hook. Following the third knockdown of the bout, the referee decided to stop the fight, awarding Yamada the technical knockout.

==== Non-title bouts ====
Yamada was scheduled to face the NJKF Welterweight Champion and S1 Japan Tournament 65 kg tournament winner Ryota Nakano in a non-title bout in the co-main event of RISE 137 on 23 February 2020. The bout was Nakano's second appearance with the promotion. Yamada maintained the pace of the bout, and cruised to a comfortable unanimous decision victory, with scores of 30–29, 30–29, 30–28.

Yamada was scheduled to face Katsuki Kitano at RISE DEAD OR ALIVE 2020 Osaka on 1 November 2020. The bout was ruled a draw after the first three rounds were fought, with one judge scoring the fight an even 29-29, while the remaining two judges were split in favor of Yamada and Kitano respectively. An extension round was fought, after which Kitano was awarded a majority decision, with scores of 9-10, 10-10, 9-10. During the post-fight press conference, Kitano called for a rematch with Yamada, for the latter's super lightweight title.

==== Title reign ====
Yamada made his first RISE title defense against the #2 ranked RISE super lightweight contender Takumi Sanekata. The fight was scheduled as the co-main event of RISE 145 on 30 January 2021. He won the fight by a unanimous decision, with all three judges scoring the fight 49–48 in Yamada's favor. During the post-fight interview, Yamada asked for a rematch with Katsuki Kitano.

The rematch between Yamada and Katsuki Kitano, ranked as the #1 RISE super lightweight contender at the time, was scheduled for the main event of RISE 150 on 18 June 2021. Yamada won the rematch by unanimous decision, with scores of 48–47, 48–46, 49–47.

Yamada was scheduled to face the RISE Lightweight champion Naoki Tanaka in a non-title bout at RISE El Dorado 2022, on 2 April 2022. He won the fight by third round knockout with punches after surviving a knockdown in the previous round.

Yamada faced the former K-1 Super Lightweight champion Rukiya Anpo at THE MATCH 2022 on 19 June 2022. The bout was contested at 67 kilograms, a career-high for Yamada. He lost the fight by a narrow unanimous decision, with all three judges scoring the bout 30–29 in his favor.

At a RISE press conference held on 4 July 2022, it was announced that Yamada would face a foreign opponent at RISE WORLD SERIES 2022 Osaka on 21 August 2022. On 22 July, it was revealed that Yamada would face Jan Kaffa. He won the fight by a third-round knockout, stopping Kaffa with a right hook at the 1:23 minute mark of the round.

Yamada faced the reigning Glory Featherweight and RISE Super Lightweight World champion Petpanomrung Kiatmuu9 in a non-title bout at RISE World Series / Shootboxing-Kings on 25 December 2022, in what he announced as his retirement bout. He lost the fight by unanimous decision, with two scorecards of 30-29 and one scorecard of 30-28.

== Championships and accomplishments ==
=== Kickboxing ===
- RISE
  - 2019 RISE Super Lightweight Championship (Two successful title defenses)

=== Karate ===
- Shin Karate
  - 2011 Shin Karate West Japan K-2 Grand Prix Lightweight Winner
  - 2012 Shin Karate All Japan G-2 Grand Prix Lightweight Runner-up
  - 2013 Shin Karate West Japan G-1 Grand Prix Lightweight Winner
  - 2013 Shin Karate All Japan G-1 Grand Prix Lightweight 3rd Place
  - 2015 Shin Karate All Japan K-2 Grand Prix Light-Middleweight Champion
- Kenbudokaikan
  - 2012 Kenbudokaikan All Japan Open Light-Middleweight Runner-up
  - 2013 Kenbudokaikan All Japan Open Light-Middleweight Runner-up
  - 2015 Kenbudokaikan All Japan Open Light-Middleweight Winner
- Seidokaikan
  - 2014 Seidokaikan All Japan Weight Championship Lightweight Runner-up
  - 2015 Seidokaikan All Kansai Tournament Light-Middleweight Winner
  - 2016 Seidokaikan All Kansai Tournament Light-Middleweight Winner
  - 2016 Seidokaikan All Kanto Tournament Light-Middleweight Winner
  - 2016 Seidokaikan All Japan Weight Championship Lightweight Winner
  - 2017 Seidokaikan All Japan Weight Championship Lightweight Winner

== Fight record ==
Kickboxing record
15 Wins (9 (T)KO's), 3 Losses, 0 Draw, 0 No Contest
Date	Result	Opponent	Event	Location	Method	Round	Time
2022-12-25	Loss	(Thailand) Petpanomrung Kiatmuu9	RISE WORLD SERIES / Glory Rivals 4	Tokyo, Japan	Decision (Unanimous)	3	3:00
2022-08-21	Win	(Netherlands) Jan Kaffa	RISE WORLD SERIES OSAKA 2022	Osaka, Japan	KO (Right hook)	3	1:23
2022-06-19	Loss	(Japan) Rukiya Anpo	THE MATCH 2022	Tokyo, Japan	Decision (Unanimous)	3	3:00
2022-04-02	Win	(Japan) Naoki Tanaka	RISE ELDORADO 2022	Tokyo, Japan	KO (Punches)	3	0:25
2021-06-18	Win	(Japan) Katsuki Kitano	RISE 150	Bunkyo, Tokyo, Japan	Decision (Unanimous)	5	3:00
Defends the RISE Super Lightweight title.
2021-01-30	Win	(Japan) Takumi Sanekata	RISE 145	Bunkyo, Tokyo, Japan	Decision (Unanimous)	5	3:00
Defends the RISE Super Lightweight title.
2020-11-01	Loss	(Japan) Katsuki Kitano	RISE DEAD OR ALIVE 2020 Osaka	Osaka, Japan	Ext. R. Decision (Majority)	4	3:00
2020-02-23	Win	(Japan) Ryota Nakano	RISE 137	Tokyo, Japan	Decision (Unanimous)	3	3:00
2019-09-29	Win	(Japan) Yuma Yamaguchi	RISE 134	Tokyo, Japan	KO (Left hook)	1	1:25
Wins the vacant RISE Super Lightweight title.
2019-07-21	Win	(Thailand) Tapruwan Hadesworkout	RISE WORLD SERIES 2019 Semi-Final Round in OSAKA	Osaka, Japan	Decision (Majority)	3	3:00
2019-02-03	Win	(Japan) Yukimitsu Takahashi	RISE 130	Tokyo, Japan	Decision (Majority)	3	3:00
2018-11-02	Win	(Japan) Fumiya Kawashima	RISE 128	Tokyo, Japan	TKO (Three knockdowns)	1	1:53
2018-09-16	Win	(Japan) Yuya	RISE 127	Tokyo, Japan	Decision (Unanimous)	3	3:00
2018-05-25	Win	(Japan) Ichiyo Morimoto	RISE 124	Tokyo, Japan	KO (Flying knee)	3	0:35
2018-02-04	Win	(Japan) Atsushi Ogata	RISE 122	Tokyo, Japan	KO (Right hook)	1	1:00
2017-10-09	Win	(Japan) Taira Katsuki	RISE 120	Koto, Tokyo, Japan	TKO (Three knockdowns)	2	2:47
2017-05-20	Win	(Japan) Possible K	RISE 117	Bunkyo, Tokyo, Japan	KO (Knee)	2	0:40
2017-03-05	Win	(Japan) Ryotaro Tamura	RISE 116	Bunkyo, Tokyo, Japan	KO (Left hook)	1	0:26

== See also ==
- List of male kickboxers
