= Meison Hide Usami =

Canadian-Japanese kickboxer and mixed martial artist (born 2001)

- Born: 宇佐美秀メイソン; May 20, 2001 (age 25); Osaka, Japan
- Nationality: Canadian; Japanese
- Height: 182 cm (6 ft 0 in)
- Weight: 67.5 kg (149 lb; 10.63 st)
- Division: Welterweight; Featherweight (MMA)
- Fighting out of: Tokyo, Japan
- Team: Vasileus; LDH martial arts Battle Box Gym
- Years active: 2022-present

Kickboxing record
- Total: 12
- Wins: 10
- By knockout: 5
- Draws: 2

Mixed martial arts record
- Total: 1
- Wins: 0
- Losses: 1
- By decision: 1

Meison Hide Usami (Japanese: 宇佐美秀メイソン, Usami Hide Meison; born May 20, 2001) is a Canadian-Japanese professional kickboxer and mixed martial artist. He competes in the welterweight division of RISE, where he is the RISE welterweight champion. He also held the interim ISKA Oriental Rules Intercontinental Welterweight championship.

Usami is the younger brother of Sho Patrick Usami who is also a mixed martial artist.

== Background ==
Usami learned karate from an early age, and after a while he left martial arts and spent his time in Canada from the age of 15 to 20. He returned to Japan at the age of 20 and started mixed martial arts (MMA). He gained experience in amateur mixed martial arts while training with Kiichi Kunimoto and Kintaro at Paraestra Higashi Osaka and other venues, and made his professional debut as a professional mixed martial artist in 2022.

== Mixed martial arts career ==
Usami made his professional mixed martial arts debut on April 24, 2022, at POUND STORM. He faced Su Sung Cho and lost by decision 1–2 after being knocked down.

== Kickboxing career ==
Usami also started kickboxing in December 2022, and has won five consecutive matches in four organizations: Ganryujima, KNOCKOUT, K-1, and RISE. He basically participates in kickboxing matches without any water. He also said that kickboxing is a "detour," saying, "I have many favorite mixed martial artists, and I want to become famous as an athlete, so I will eventually return to mixed martial arts."

=== RISE ===
Usami faced Ryota Nakano at RISE WORLD SERIES 2024 OSAKA on June 15, 2024. The fight ended in a majority decision draw, after two extra rounds were contested.

Usami faced Takumi Sanekata for the vacant RISE welterweight championship at GLORY RISE Featherweight Grand Prix on December 21, 2024. He won the bout by unanimous decision to win the title.

Usami faced Jerald Villarde at RISE ELDORADO 2025 on March 29, 2025. He won the bout by knockout in the second round.

Usami faced Sang-hae Cho at Rizin World Series in Korea. The bout ended in a unanimous draw.

Usami faced Sang-hae Cho in a rematch at the RISE World Series 2025 Final. He won the bout by majority decision.

== Championships and accomplishments ==
=== Kickboxing ===
- International Sport Kickboxing Association
  - 2023 interim ISKA Oriental Rules Intercontinental Welterweight (-55 kg) Championship
- RISE
  - RISE Welterweight (-67.5kg) Championship (One time, current)

=== Karate ===
- Shin Karate
  - 2011 Shin Karate All Japan K-4 Grand Prix Winner

== Kickboxing record ==
Professional Kickboxing Record
10 Wins (5 (T)KO's), 0 Losses, 2 Draw, 0 No Contest
Date	Result	Opponent	Event	Location	Method	Round	Time
2026-09-10	Win	(Japan) BeyNoah	Super Rizin 5	Osaka, Japan	Decision (Unanimous)	3	3:00
2026-06-06	Win	(Thailand) Peemai Por.Kobkua	RISE World Series 2026 Tokyo	Tokyo, Japan	KO (Uppercut)	1	0:43
2025-11-02	Win	(South Korea) Sang-hae Cho	RISE World Series 2025 Final	Tokyo, Japan	Decision (Majority)	3	3:00
2025-05-31	Draw	(South Korea) Sang-hae Cho	Rizin World Series in Korea	Incheon, South Korea	Decision (Unanimous)	3	3:00
2025-03-29	Win	(Philippines) Jerald Villarde	RISE ELDORADO 2025	Tokyo, Japan	KO (knee to the head)	2	1:41
2024-12-21	Win	(Japan) Takumi Sanekata	GLORY RISE Featherweight Grand Prix	Chiba, Japan	Decision (Unanimous)	5	3:00
Won the vacant RISE Welterweight (-67.5kg) title.
2024-06-15	Draw	(Japan) Ryota Nakano	RISE WORLD SERIES 2024 OSAKA	Osaka, Japan	Tech. Decision (Majority)	1	2:37
2024-03-20	Win	(Japan) Yasuhito Shirasu	K-1 World MAX 2024 - World Tournament Opening Round	Tokyo, Japan	KO (Right hook)	2	2:13
2023-12-09	Win	(Japan) Kaito	K-1 ReBIRTH 2	Osaka, Japan	KO (Left straight)	2	1:05
2023-09-16	Win	(France) Jamal Wahib	Knock Out 2023 vol.4	Tokyo, Japan	KO (Right hook)	1	2:25
Won interim ISKA Oriental Rules Intercontinental Welterweight title.
2023-03-04	Win	(Japan) Shinya Sugihara	Knock Out 2023 Super Bout Blaze	Tokyo, Japan	Decision (Unanimous)	3	3:00
2022-12-28	Win	(Netherlands) Albert Kraus	INOKI BOM-BA-YE × Ganryujima	Tokyo, Japan	Decision (Unanimous)	3	3:00
Legend: Win Loss Draw/No contest Notes

== Mixed martial arts record ==
Professional record breakdown
1 match	0 wins	1 loss
By decision	0	1

Res.	Record	Opponent	Method	Event	Date	Round	Time	Location	Notes
Loss	0–1	Su Sung Cho	Decision (split)	LDH Martial Arts: Pound Storm	April 24, 2022	3	5:00	Tokyo, Japan	Featherweight debut.

== See also ==
- List of male kickboxers
