= Renta Nishioka =

Japanese kickboxer (born 1999)

- Born: 西岡 蓮太; April 11, 1999 (age 27); Osaka, Japan
- Nationality: Japanese
- Height: 174 cm (5 ft 9 in)
- Weight: 63.0 kg (138.9 lb; 9.92 st)
- Style: Shootboxing
- Stance: Orthodox
- Fighting out of: Osaka, Japan
- Team: Ryusei Juku
- Years active: 2015 - 2022

Kickboxing record
- Total: 26
- Wins: 20
- By knockout: 6
- Losses: 6
- By knockout: 2

Renta Nishioka (Japanese: 西岡蓮太, Nishioka Renta; born 11 April 1999) is a retired Japanese kickboxer, who competed in Shootboxing and KNOCK OUT. He is the former Shootboxing Japan lightweight champion, having held the title between 2018 and 2022.

== Kickboxing career ==
=== Early career ===
Nishioka made his professional debut against Kento Koga at SHOOT BOXING YOUNG CEASER CUP CENTARL #13 on May 17, 2015. He lost the fight by unanimous decision. Nishioka next faced Kanade Nakai at DEEP☆KICK 26 on July 26, 2015. He won the fight by a second-round technical knockout. Nishioka extended his winning streak to two fights, after beating Asahi Hinuma by unanimous decision at SHOOT BOXING 2015～SB30th Anniversary～ act.4 on September 19, 2015. His winning streak was snapped by Toyozo Suzuki, who beat him by knockout at SHOOT BOXING YOUNG CEASER CUP CENTARL #15 on November 1, 2015.

After suffering his second professional loss, Nishioka was booked to face Yusuke Fumiyama at HIGHSPEED EX on May 22, 2016. He won the fight by unanimous decision, with scores of 29–27, 29–28 and 30–27. Nishioka faced another opponent outside of Shootboxing, as he faced Susumu Yoshida at DEEP☆KICK30 on June 17, 2016. He won the fight by a second-round knockout.

Nishioka faced YUSHI at SHOOT BOXING OSAKA 2016 “ALPINISME vol.1” on August 13, 2016, in his return to Shootboxing. He won the fight by a second-round knockout. Nishioka was scheduled to face GG Ito at SHOOT BOXING 2017 Young Cesar act.1 on March 11, 2017. He won the fight by a dominant unanimous decision, with all three judges scoring the fight 30–24 in his favor. He won the fight by a second-round technical knockout. Nishioka re-matched YUSHI at SHOOT BOXING 2017 act.3 on June 16, 2016. He won the fight by a second-round technical knockout.

Nishioka was booked to face Akinori in a DEEP KICK lightweight title eliminator at DEEP☆KICK 33 on July 16, 2017. He won the fight by a first-round technical knockout. Nishioka knocked Akinori down early on in the first round, and knocked him down a further two times by the 1:52 minute mark, when the referee waved the fight off. Before challenging for the DEEP KICK title, Nishioka faced Kazuya Ueda at SHOOT BOXING 2017 act.4 on September 16, 2017. He won the fight by unanimous decision. Nishioka challenged the DEEP KICK lightweight champion Atsushi YAMATO at DEEP☆KICK 34 on December 17, 2017. He lost the fight by unanimous decision, with scores of 30–28, 29–28 and 30–29.

=== Shootboxing lightweight champion ===
==== Title reign ====
Nishioka challenged the Shootboxing Japan lightweight champion Kiyoaki Murata at SHOOT BOXING2018 act.4 on September 15, 2018. Nishioka won the closely contested bout by split decision, after two extension rounds were contested.

Nishioka face the ISKA Muay Thai Intercontinental Super Lightweight champion Haruaki Otsuki in a non-title bout at SHOOT BOXING S-cup 65 kg World TOURNAMENT 2018 on November 18, 2018. He won the fight by unanimous decision, with scores of 28–27, 28–26 and 28–26.

Nishioka was booked to face the reigning KNOCK OUT Super Lightweight and RISE lightweight champion Fukashi Mizutani in a non-title bout at SHOOT BOXING 2019 act.2 on April 27, 2019. He won the fight by unanimous decision.

Nishioka faced Yuki Masui at SHOOT BOXING 2019 act.3 on June 23, 2019. He won the fight by unanimous decision. Nishioka next faced Masa Sato at SHOOT BOXING 2019 act.4 on September 28, 2019. He won the fight by unanimous decision, with all three judges scoring the bout 49–48 in his favor. Nishioka's six-fight winning streak was snapped by Hikaru Machida at SHOOT BOXING GROUND ZERO TOKYO 2019 on December 3, 2019, who beat him by unanimous decision.

==== KNOCK OUT Grand Prix ====
On January 20, 2020, KNOCK OUT announced Nishioka as one of the eight participants in the upcoming one-day KNOCK OUT 64 kg Grand Prix, which was held at KNOCK OUT CHAMPIONSHIP.1 on February 11, 2020. He was scheduled to face Sho Ogawa in the tournament quarterfinals. The fight was ruled a draw, after the first three rounds were contested, which resulted in an extension round. Nishioka won the fourth round by split decision.

Nishioka advanced to the tournament semifinals, where he faced Chihiro Suzuki. He won the fight by unanimous decision, with two judges scoring the bout 30–29 in his favor, while the third judge awarded him a 30–29 scorecard. Nishioka faced Bazooka Koki in the tournament finals. He won the third and final fight of the day by unanimous decision, with scores of 30–29, 29–28 and 29–28.

==== Later title reign ====
Nishioka participated in the 2020 RISE Dead of Alive lightweight tournament, which was held on November 20, 2020. He was scheduled to face the reigning RISE Lightweight champion Kento Haraguchi in the tournament semifinals. Haraguchi won the fight through a dominant unanimous decision.

Nishioka made his first SHOOT BOXING lightweight title defense against Hiroki Kasahara at SHOOT BOXING 2022 act.2 on April 10, 2022. He lost the fight and his title by knockout in the second round from a body shot.

=== Retirement ===
Nishioka faced the undefeated Hiroki Suzuki at KNOCK OUT 2022 vol. 6 on October 16, 2022, in a -64 kg catchweight bout. He won the fight by unanimous decision, with two scorecards of 30–28 and one scorecard of 30–29.

Nishioka announced his retirement from professional competition on April 2, 2023, due to a number of wrist injuries. After undergoing several surgeries between 2017 and 2023, Nishioka suffered severe cartilage deterioration and bone deformation in his left wrist, which caused severe pain in training and competition.

== Titles and accomplishments ==
Amateur

- DEEP KICK
  - 2014 TOP RUN -65 kg Champion
- Shoot boxing
  - 2014 All Japan Shoot Boxing Junior -65 kg Champion

Professional

- Shoot boxing
  - 2018 SHOOT BOXING Japan Lightweight Champion
- KNOCK OUT
  - 2020 KNOCK OUT Grand Prix -64 kg Winner

== Fight record ==
Kickboxing record
20 Wins (6 (T)KO's), 6 Losses, 0 Draw, 0 No Contest
Date	Result	Opponent	Event	Location	Method	Round	Time
2022-10-16	Win	(Japan) Hiroki Suzuki	KNOCK OUT 2022 Vol. 6	Tokyo, Japan	Decision (Unanimous)	3	3:00
2022-04-10	Loss	(Japan) Hiroki Kasahara	SHOOT BOXING 2022 act.2	Tokyo, Japan	KO (Left hook to the body)	2	1:24
Loses the SHOOT BOXING Japan Lightweight title.
2020-10-11	Loss	(Japan) Kento Haraguchi	RISE DEAD OR ALIVE 2020 Yokohama, Semi Final	Yokohama, Japan	Decision (Unanimous)	3	3:00
2020-02-11	Win	(Japan) Bazooka Koki	KNOCK OUT CHAMPIONSHIP.1 – 64 kg Grand Prix Final	Tokyo, Japan	Decision (Unanimous)	3	3:00
Wins KNOCK OUT Grand Prix -64kg title.
2020-02-11	Win	(Japan) Chihiro Suzuki	KNOCK OUT CHAMPIONSHIP.1 – 64 kg Grand Prix Semi Finals	Tokyo, Japan	Decision (Unanimous)	3	3:00
2020-02-11	Win	(Japan) Sho Ogawa	KNOCK OUT CHAMPIONSHIP.1 – 64 kg Grand Prix Quarter Finals	Tokyo, Japan	Ext.R Decision (Split)	4	3:00
2019-12-03	Loss	(Japan) Hikaru Machida	SHOOT BOXING GROUND ZERO TOKYO 2019	Tokyo, Japan	Decision (Unanimous)	3	3:00
2019-09-28	Win	(Japan) Masa Sato	SHOOT BOXING 2019 act.4	Tokyo, Japan	Decision (Majority)	3	3:00
2019-06-23	Win	(Japan) Yuki Masui	SHOOT BOXING 2019 act.3	Tokyo, Japan	Decision (Unanimous)	3	3:00
2019-04-27	Win	(Japan) Fukashi	SHOOT BOXING 2019 act.2	Tokyo, Japan	Decision (Unanimous)	3	3:00
2018-11-18	Win	(Japan) Haruaki Otsuki	SHOOT BOXING S-cup 65 kg World TOURNAMENT 2018	Tokyo, Japan	Decision (Unanimous)	3	3:00
2018-09-15	Win	(Japan) Kiyoaki Murata	SHOOT BOXING 2018 act.4	Tokyo, Japan	2nd Ext.R Decision (Split)	7	3:00
Wins the SHOOT BOXING Japan Lightweight title.
2018-06-10	Win	(Japan) Possible K	SHOOT BOXING 2018 act.3	Tokyo, Japan	Decision (Unanimous)	3	3:00
2017-12-17	Loss	(Japan) Atsushi YAMATO	DEEP☆KICK 34	Osaka, Japan	Decision (Unanimous)	3	3:00
For the DEEP KICK -63kg title.
2017-09-16	Win	(Japan) Kazuya Ueda	SHOOT BOXING 2017 act.4	Tokyo, Japan	Decision (Unanimous)	3	3:00
2017-07-16	Win	(Japan) Akinori	DEEP☆KICK 33	Osaka, Japan	TKO (Punches)	1	1:52
2017-06-16	Win	(Japan) YUSHI	SHOOT BOXING 2017 act.3	Tokyo, Japan	TKO (Knee)	2	2:01
2017-05-13	Win	(Japan) Super Anji	SHOOT BOXING 2017 Young Cesar act.2	Tokyo, Japan	TKO (Left Hook)	2	3:00
2017-03-11	Win	(Japan) GG Ito	SHOOT BOXING 2017 Young Cesar act.1	Tokyo, Japan	Decision (Unanimous)	3	3:00
2016-08-13	Win	(Japan) YUSHI	SHOOT BOXING OSAKA 2016 “ALPINISME vol.1”	Osaka, Japan	KO (Right Cross)	2	1:07
2016-07-17	Win	(Japan) Susumu Yoshida	DEEP☆KICK30	Osaka, Japan	TKO	2	0:33
2016-05-22	Win	(Japan) Yusuke Fumiyama	HIGHSPEED EX	Osaka, Japan	Decision (Unanimous)	3	3:00
2015-11-01	Loss	(Japan) Toyozo Suzuki	SHOOT BOXING YOUNG CEASER CUP CENTRAL #15	Aichi Prefecture, Japan	KO		
2015-09-19	Win	(Japan) Asahi Hinuma	SHOOT BOXING 2015～SB 30th Anniversary～ act.4	Tokyo, Japan	Decision (Unanimous)	3	3:00
2015-07-26	Win	(Japan) Kanade Nakai	DEEP☆KICK 26	Osaka, Japan	TKO (Corner Stoppage)	2	0:58
2015-05-17	Loss	(Japan) Kento Koga	SHOOT BOXING YOUNG CEASER CUP CENTRAL #13	Aichi Prefecture, Japan	Decision (Unanimous)	3	3:00
Legend: Win Loss Draw/No contest Notes

=== Amateur record ===
Amateur Kickboxing record
Date	Result	Opponent	Event	Location	Method	Round	Time
2014-12-21	Win	(Japan) Hiroki Kokubo	Amateur SHOOT BOXING	Tokyo, Japan	TKO	1	
Wins Amateur Shoot Boxing All Japan -65kg title
2014-10-05	Win	(Japan) Ryoga Imoto	Amateur SHOOT BOXING	Tokyo, Japan	Decision (Unanimous)	2	2:00
2014-09-28	Win	(Japan) Ken Ishihashi	NEXT LEVEL	Osaka, Japan	Decision (Unanimous)	2	2:00
Wins TOP RUN -65kg title.
2014-06-15	Win	(Japan) Yuki Mitsuyasu	NEXT LEVEL 15	Osaka, Japan	TKO	2	
2014-04-20	Win	(Japan) Kota Hirayama	Amateur SHOOT BOXING	Osaka, Japan	Decision (Unanimous)	3	2:00
2014-04-20	Win	(Japan) Hiroki Kasahara	Amateur SHOOT BOXING	Osaka, Japan	Ext.R Decision (Unanimous)	4	2:00
2014-03-16	Loss	(Japan) Yuuma Yamatake	NEXT LEVEL Kansai 15	Osaka, Japan	Decision (Majority)	2	2:00
2013-12-01	Draw	(Japan) Kensei Kondo	NEXT LEVEL Kansai 11	Sakai, Japan	Decision	2	2:00
2013-11-16	Loss	(Japan) Ayato Ando	SHOOT BOXING GROUND ZERO TOKYO 2013	Tokyo, Japan	Decision (Unanimous)	2	2:00
For the Amateur All Japan Shoot Boxing Junior +55kg title.
2013-10-20	Draw	(Japan) Taiki Sawatani	NEXT LEVEL Kansai 10	Osaka, Japan	Decision (Majority)	2	2:00
2013-07-07	Win	(Japan) Atsushi Hatake	NEXT LEVEL Kansai 8	Sakai, Japan	Decision (Unanimous)	2	2:00
2013-06-16	Win	(Japan) Yoshihito Kawafuji	Amateur Shootboxing	Osaka, Japan	Decision		
2013-04-14	Loss	(Japan) Daichi Tanazawa	Amateur SHOOT BOXING	Tokyo, Japan	KO (Right hook)	2	
2013-02-24	Win	(Japan) Shintaro Miyamoto	Amateur SHOOT BOXING	Tokyo, Japan	KO (High kick)	1	
2012-12-16	Loss	(Japan) Yuto Shinohara	NEXT☆LEVEL Kansai 3	Osaka, Japan	TKO	1	1:17
2012-09-23	Loss	(Japan) Tsukasa Nijou	NEXT☆LEVEL 1	Osaka, Japan	Decision (Unanimous)	2	2:00
2012-07-08	Win	(Japan) Aso Ishiwaki	DEEP☆KICK 12	Osaka, Japan	Decision (Unanimous)	2	2:00
2012-06-17	Win	(Japan) Junichi Nakagawa	KAKUMEI KICKBOXING	Osaka, Japan	Decision (Unanimous)	2	2:00
2012-05-06	Loss	(Japan) Masahiro Satomi	NEXT LEVEL	Osaka, Japan	Decision (Unanimous)	2	2:00
Legend: Win Loss Draw/No contest Notes
