= Chihiro Nakajima =

Japanese kickboxer

- Born: 中島千博; November 24, 1994 (age 31); Nerima, Japan
- Height: 169 cm (5 ft 7 in)
- Weight: 60 kg (130 lb; 9.4 st)
- Division: Bantamweight
- Style: Kyokushin, Kickboxing
- Stance: Orthodox
- Fighting out of: Tokyo, Japan
- Team: Power of Dream
- Trainer: Seiichi Furukawa (kickboxing)
- Years active: 2019 - present

Kickboxing record
- Total: 18
- Wins: 11
- By knockout: 5
- Losses: 7
- By knockout: 2

Chihiro Nakajima (born 24 November 1994) is a Japanese karateka and kickboxer, and competes in the super featherweight division of Krush, where he is the former Super Featherweight champion.

As of February 2022, Combat Press ranks him as the sixth best bantamweight kickboxer in the world.

== Kickboxing career ==
=== Early career ===
Nakajima made his professional debut against Manato Yasuda at K-1 Krush Fight 101 on May 18, 2019. He won the fight by second-round technical knockout. Nakajima next faced Junpei Sano at K-1 Krush Fight 104 on August 31, 2019. He won the fight by a third-round knockout, stopping Sano with a spinning back kick.

Nakajima faced Tomoya Yokoyama in his third professional appearance at Krush 111 on February 24, 2020. He suffered the first loss of his professional career, as Yokoyama won the bout by unanimous decision.

Nakajima faced Naoki Yamamoto at Krush 117 on September 26, 2020. He lost the fight by unanimous decision, with all three judges scoring the fight 28-26 for Yamamoto.

Nakajima faced Kento Ito at Krush 125 on May 30, 2021. He won the fight by unanimous decision, with scores of 30–28, 30-27 and 30–26. Nakajima knocked Ito down with a left hook in the second round.

=== Krush super featherweight champion ===
==== Super featherweight tournament ====
On September 3, 2021, K-1 announced that Leona Pettas had vacated the Krush Super Featherweight title. Accordingly, the promotion immediately organized a tournament in order to crown a new champion. Chihiro Nakajima was scheduled to face Satoru Nariai in the tournament quarterfinals, which were held at Krush 130 on October 31, 2021. Nakajima won the fight by a third-round knockout. He first knocked Nariai down with a right high kick, before finishing him with a left hook at the 1:05 minute mark of the last round.

Nakajima faced Yutaka in the penultimate bout of the tournament, at Krush 130 on January 28, 2022. He made quick work of his opponent, stopping him with a flurry of punches in the first round. Nakajima advanced to the tournament finals, which were held on the same day, where he faced Tomoya Yokoyama. The fight was a rematch of their February 24, 2020 meeting, which Yokoyama won by unanimous decision. Nakajima was more successful in their second encounter, as he won the fight by unanimous decision. He managed to knock Yokoyama down in the third round, which proved crucial, as the first two rounds were evenly scored.

==== Title reign ====
Nakajima faced the Shootboxing Japan super featherweight champion Yuki Kasahara at THE MATCH 2022 on June 19, 2022. He lost the fight by unanimous decision, with scores of 30–28, 30–28 and 30–27. He failed to achieve much headway in the bout and was knocked down with a right hook in the third round.

Nakajima made his first Krush Super Featherweight title defense against Narufumi Nishimoto at Krush 144 on December 18, 2022. He retained the title by unanimous decision, with three scorecards of 30–28 in his favor. Nakajima knocked his opponent down with a left hook in the last round, which earned him a 10–8 round on all three of the judges' scorecards and proved to be the pivotal moment of the bout.

Nakajima was expected to face Han Kyungmin in a super featherweight bout at K-1 World GP 2023: inaugural Middleweight Championship Tournament on June 3, 2023. The bout was later bumped up to a 60.6 kg catchweight, as Kyungmin failed to make weight at the official weigh-ins. Nakajima stopped his opponent with a liver shot at the 1:06 minute mark of the second round.

Nakajima made his second Krush Super Featherweight title defense against Naoki Takahashi at Krush 153 on September 29, 2023. He lost the fight by majority decision, with scores of 30–30, 30–29 and 30–29.

=== K-1 ===
Nakajima faced the one-time RISE bantamweight and K-1 featherweight champion Yuta Murakoshi in a 61.5 kg catchweight bout at K-1 World MAX 2024 on September 29, 2024. He won the fight by unanimous decision, with scores of 30–28, 30–28 and 30–27, after once knocking Murakoshi down in the final round.

Nakajima faced the ISKA Intercontinental Super Featherweight (-59 kg) champion Ali Laamari in the quarterfinals of the 6th K-1 Super Featherweight Grand Prix at K-1 Beyond on May 31, 2025. He was able to knock Laamari down with a right hook near the end of the final round, which proved to be pivotal on all three of the judges' scorecards, who scored the bout 30—28 in his favor. Nakajima faced Rémi Parra in the Grand Prix semifinals. He lost the fight by technical knockout, after twice being knocked down in the second round.

Nakajima faced Yuta Matsuyama at K-1 World GP 2026 - 90kg World Tournament on February 8, 2026. He won the fight by unanimous decision, with three scorecards of 30—29 in his favor.

== Championships and accomplishments ==
=== Kickboxing ===
- Krush
  - 2022 Krush Super Featherweight (-60 kg) Champion
    - One successful title defense

=== Karate ===
- IKO Kyokushinkaikan
  - 2011 All Japan Youth (U-18) Championships -75 kg Winner
  - 2012 World Youth Elite (U-18) Championships -75 kg Winner
  - 2013 All Kanto Open runner-up
  - 2013 All Japan Open Rookie Award
  - 2016 All Japan Weight Championships -90 kg 3rd place
  - 2017 All Japan Weight Championships -90 kg Winner
  - 2017 All Japan Open Technique Award
  - 2017 All American Open 3rd place
  - 2018 All American Weight Championships Heavyweight Winner
  - 2018 All Japan Championships Semi Contact -80 kg Winner

== Kickboxing record ==
Kickboxing record
11 Wins (5 (T)KO's), 7 Losses, 0 Draws, 0 No Contests
Date	Result	Opponent	Event	Location	Method	Round	Time
2026-09-26	Loss	(Japan) Toma	Krush 192	Tokyo, Japan	KO (left cross)	2	2:03
2026-02-08	Loss	(Japan) Yuta Matsuyama	K-1 World GP 2026 - 90kg World Tournament	Tokyo, Japan	Decision (Unanimous)	3	3:00
2025-05-31	Loss	(France) Rémi Parra	K-1 Beyond - Super Featherweight Championship Tournament, Semifinals	Yokohama, Japan	TKO (2 knockdowns)	2	1:52
2025-05-31	Win	(Spain) Ali Laamari	K-1 Beyond - Super Featherweight Championship Tournament, Quarterfinals	Yokohama, Japan	Decision (Unanimous)	3	3:00
2024-12-14	Win	(Belarus) Daniil Yermolenka	K-1 World Grand Prix 2024 Final	Tokyo, Japan	Ext.R Decision (Unanimous)	4	3:00
2024-09-29	Win	(Japan) Yuta Murakoshi	K-1 World MAX 2024	Tokyo, Japan	Decision (Unanimous)	3	3:00
2023-09-29	Loss	(Japan) Naoki Takahashi	Krush 153	Tokyo, Japan	Decision (Majority)	3	3:00
Loses the Krush Super Featherweight title.
2023-06-03	Win	(South Korea) Han Kyungmin	K-1 World GP 2023: inaugural Middleweight Championship Tournament	Yokohama, Japan	KO (Left hook to the body)	2	1:06
2022-12-18	Win	(Japan) Narufumi Nishimoto	Krush 144	Tokyo, Japan	Decision (Unanimous)	3	3:00
Defends the Krush Super Featherweight title.
2022-06-19	Loss	(Japan) Yuki Kasahara	THE MATCH 2022	Tokyo, Japan	Decision (Unanimous)	3	3:00
2022-01-28	Win	(Japan) Tomoya Yokoyama	Krush 133, Tournament Finals	Tokyo, Japan	Decision (Unanimous)	3	3:00
Wins the vacant Krush Super Featherweight title.
2022-01-28	Win	(Japan) Yutaka	Krush 133, Tournament Semifinals	Tokyo, Japan	TKO (Punches + knees)	1	2:56
2021-10-31	Win	(Japan) Satoru Nariai	Krush 130, Tournament Quarterfinals	Tokyo, Japan	KO (Left hook)	3	1:05
2021-05-30	Win	(Japan) Kento Ito	Krush 125	Tokyo, Japan	Decision (Unanimous)	3	3:00
2020-09-26	Loss	(Japan) Naoki Yamamoto	Krush 117	Tokyo, Japan	Decision (Unanimous)	3	3:00
2020-02-24	Loss	(Japan) Tomoya Yokoyama	Krush 111	Tokyo, Japan	Decision (Unanimous)	3	3:00
2019-08-31	Win	(Japan) Junpei Sano	Krush 104	Tokyo, Japan	KO (Spinning back kick)	3	0:32
2019-05-18	Win	(Japan) Manato Yasuda	Krush 101	Tokyo, Japan	TKO (Three knockdowns)	2	2:44
Legend: Win Loss Draw/No contest Notes

== See also ==
- List of male kickboxers
- List of Krush champions
