= Yuki Yoza =

Japanese professional kickboxer

- Born: 与座 優貴; December 20, 1997 (age 28); Tsuchiura, Ibaraki Prefecture, Japan
- Height: 171 cm (5 ft 7 in)
- Weight: 63 kg (139 lb; 9.9 st)
- Style: Kyokushinkaikan
- Stance: Orthodox
- Fighting out of: Tokyo, Japan
- Team: Team Vasileus (2023-present); K-1 Gym Sagami Ono KREST (2021-2023); Hashimoto Dojo (2019-2021); Ibaraki Joso Soshibu (Karate)
- Rank: Second dan black belt in Kyokushin karate
- Years active: 2019-present

Kickboxing record
- Total: 27
- Wins: 23
- By knockout: 8
- Losses: 4
- By knockout: 0

Yuki Yoza (Japanese: 与座優貴, Yoza Yuki; born December 20, 1997) is a Japanese professional kickboxer and former Kyokushin practitioner, who currently competes in the Bantamweight Kickboxing division of ONE Championship. He is the former K-1 lightweight champion.

As of September 2025, Yoza is ranked the #8 pound-for-pound kickboxer in the world by Beyond Kick.

== Professional career ==
=== Early career ===
==== Career beginnings ====
Yoza made his professional kickboxing debut against Masahiro Kojika at Japanese Kickboxing Innovation Join Forces 12 on March 31, 2019. He won the fight by a third-round technical knockout, after knocking Kojika down three times by the 2:38 minute mark. Yoza faced Tatsuro Fukui at Japanese Kickboxing Innovation Join Forces 13 on May 19, 2019. He won the fight by a third-round technical knockout. The ringside physician was called in at the very end of the round, due to a cut on Fukui's face, who advised the referee to stop the fight.

Yoza made his promotional debut with REBELS against Yoshiki at REBELS 61 on June 9, 2019. He won the fight by split decision. Two of the judges scored the fight 30–28 and 29–28 in his favor, while the third judge scored the fight 29–28 for Yoshiki.

Yoza was booked to face Volcano Imoto at Japanese Kickboxing Innovation Join Forces 14 on July 15, 2019. He knocked Imoto out with a head kick at the 2:30 minute mark of the first round.

Yoza faced Johnny Oliveira at K.O CLIMAX 2019 on August 18, 2019. He won the fight by unanimous decision, with scores of 29–28, 30–29 and 30–28. Yoza faced Tereka∞ at REBELS 63×KNOCK OUT on October 6, 2019. He won the fight by unanimous decision, with all three judges awarding him a 30–26 scorecard. Yoza scored the sole knockdown of the fight late in the third round, flooring Tereka with a left hook.

Yoza faced Tatsuya Inaishi at SNKA SOUL IN THE RING CLIMAX on December 8, 2019. He won the fight by majority decision.

==== KNOCK OUT tournaments ====
On December 23, 2019, it was announced that Yoza would participate in the 2020 KNOCK OUT 64 kg Grand Prix. Yoza was booked to face Chihiro Suzuki in the tournament quarterfinals, which were held on February 11, 2020. He lost the fight by majority decision. Two of the judges scored the bout 29–28 for Suzuki, while the third judge scored it as an even 28–28 draw.

After suffering his first professional loss, Yoza was booked to face Masaya Kubo at REBELS 67 on November 8, 2020. He won the fight by majority decision, with scores of 30–29, 30–29 and 29–28. Yoza next faced Tomo Kiire at Japan Kickboxing Innovation Champions Carnival 2020 on December 27, 2020. He won the fight by a third-round knockout.

On January 29, 2021, it was revealed that Yoza would take part in the 2021 KNOCK OUT super lightweight BLACK tournament. Yoza was scheduled to face Keijiro Miyakoshi in the semifinals, which were held on March 13, 2021. He lost the fight by split decision, after an extra round was fought.

=== K-1 ===
==== Early promotional career ====
Yoza made his K-1 debut against Hikaru Hasumi at Krush 132 on December 18, 2021. He won the fight by a second-round knockout, stopping Hikaru with a head kick 17 seconds into the round.

Yoza was booked to face the K-1 Lightweight champion Taio Asahisa in a non-title bout at K-1 World GP 2022 Japan on February 27, 2022. He won the fight by unanimous decision, after an extension round fought. Yoza called for a title fight with Asahisa in his post-fight interview.

Following his upset defeat of Asahisa, Yoza faced the former Krush Super Lightweight champion Yuto Shinohara in a lightweight bout at K-1 World GP 2022 in Fukuoka on August 11, 2022. He won the fight by a second-round knockout, stopping Shinohara with low kicks.

Yoza faced the former Rajadamnern Stadium super lightweight champion Aikpikart Mor.Krungthepthonburi at K-1 World GP 2022 in Osaka on December 3, 2022. He won the fight by unanimous decision, with all three judges awarding him every round of the bout.

==== Lightweight champion ====
Yoza was booked to challenge Taio Asahisa for the K-1 Lightweight Championship at K-1 World GP 2023: K'Festa 6 on March 12, 2023. He won the fight by unanimous decision, with two scorecards of 30–29 and one scorecard of 30–28.

Yoza faced Aaron Clarke in a non-title bout at K-1 World GP 2023 in Yokohama on June 3, 2023. He won the fight by unanimous decision, with scores of 30–28, 30–28 and 30–27. Yoza faced Aikmongkol Gaiyanghadao in another non-title bout at K-1 World GP 2023 on July 17, 2023. He needed just 43 seconds to knock Aikmongkol out.

Yoza faced the reigning RISE Lightweight champion Kan Nakamura in a cross-promotional bout at RISE ELDORADO 2024 on March 17, 2024. He won the fight by a third-round knockout. The victory was overturned to a majority decision win for Yoza on March 22, as the stoppage was judged to have resulted from an illegal strike on review.

Yoza faced the former K-1 Lightweight (-62.5kg) titleholder Kongnapa Weerasakreck at K-1 World MAX 2024 - World Championship Tournament Final on July 7, 2024. He won the fight by a first-round technical knockout.

Yoza faced Petchdam Petchyindee Academy at K-1 World MAX 2024 on September 29, 2024. He won the fight by a third-round knockout.

On April 18, 2025, it was announced Yoza relinquished his K-1 title and that his contract with K-1 had to come to an end.

=== ONE Championship ===
Yoza was announced to have signed a contract with ONE Championship on April 22, 2025. He made his ONE debut at ONE Friday Fights 109 against Elbrus Osmanov. Yoza won the fight by unanimous decision.

Yoza faced Superlek Kiatmuu9 at ONE 173 on November 16, 2025. He won the fight by unanimous decision.

Yoza challenged Jonathan Haggerty for the ONE Bantamweight Kickboxing World Championship at ONE Samurai 1 on April 29, 2026. He was defeated by unanimous decision after a five-round bout.

== Titles and accomplishments ==
=== Kickboxing ===
Professional

- K-1
  - 2023 K-1 Lightweight (-62.5 kg) Championship

Awards

- eFight.jp
  - Fighter of the Month (February 2022 and May 2025)
- Beyond Kickboxing
  - Beyond Kickboxing's 2022 Breakthrough Fighter of the Year
  - Beyond Kickboxing's 2025 Fighter of the Year

=== Karate ===
- IKO Kyokushinkaikan
  - 2012 International Youth (U-15) Championships -55 kg 3rd place
  - 2013 All Japan High School (U-15) Championships -65 kg Winner
  - 2013 International Youth (U-15) Championships -65 kg Winner
  - 2014 World Youth Elite (U-18) Championships -65 kg runner-up
  - 2014 All Japan Weight Championships -70 kg 4th place
  - 2015 World Youth Elite (U-18) Championships - 65 kg runner-up
  - 2015 All Japan Weight Championships -70 kg 3rd place
  - 2016 All Japan Weight Championships -70 kg Winner
  - 2017 World Weight Championships -70 kg Winner
  - 2018 All Japan Weight Championships -80 kg Runner-up

== Fight record ==
Professional Kickboxing and Muay Thai Record
23 Wins (9 (T)KO's), 4 Losses, 0 Draw, 0 No Contest
Date	Result	Opponent	Event	Location	Method	Round	Time
2026-10-17	Loss	(Thailand) Nabil Anane	ONE Samurai 4	Tokyo, Japan	Decision (Unanimous)	3	3:00
2026-07-17	Win	(United Kingdom) Ben Woolliss	ONE: The Inner Circle 22, Lumpinee Stadium	Bangkok, Thailand	Decision (unanimous)	3	3:00
2026-04-29	Loss	(United Kingdom) Jonathan Haggerty	ONE Samurai 1	Tokyo, Japan	Decision (Unanimous)	5	3:00
For the ONE Bantamweight Kickboxing World Championship.
2025-11-16	Win	(Thailand) Superlek Kiatmuu9	ONE 173	Tokyo, Japan	Decision (Unanimous)	3	3:00
2025-07-18	Win	(Thailand) Petchtanong Petchfergus	ONE Friday Fights 116, Lumpinee Stadium	Bangkok, Thailand	Decision (Unanimous)	3	3:00
2025-05-23	Win	(Russia) Elbrus Osmanov	ONE Friday Fights 109, Lumpinee Stadium	Bangkok, Thailand	Decision (Unanimous)	3	3:00
2024-09-29	Win	(Thailand) Petchdam Petchyindee Academy	K-1 World MAX 2024	Tokyo, Japan	KO (Low kicks)	3	1:12
2024-07-07	Win	(Thailand) Kongnapa Weerasakreck	K-1 World MAX 2024 - World Championship Tournament Final	Tokyo, Japan	TKO (3 Knockdowns)	1	2:30
2024-03-17	Win	(Japan) Kan Nakamura	RISE ELDORADO 2024	Tokyo, Japan	Tech.Decision (Majority)	3	2:33
2023-07-17	Win	(Thailand) Aikmongkol Gaiyanghadao	K-1 World GP 2023	Tokyo, Japan	KO (Liver kick)	1	0:43
2023-06-03	Win	(Republic of Ireland) Aaron Clarke	K-1 World GP 2023: inaugural Middleweight Championship Tournament	Yokohama, Japan	Decision (Unanimous)	3	3:00
2023-03-12	Win	(Japan) Taio Asahisa	K-1 World GP 2023: K'Festa 6	Tokyo, Japan	Decision (Unanimous)	3	3:00
Wins the K-1 Lightweight (-62.5kg) title.
2022-12-03	Win	(Thailand) Aikpikart Mor.Krungthepthonburi	K-1 World GP 2022 in Osaka	Osaka, Japan	Decision (Unanimous)	3	3:00
2022-08-11	Win	(Japan) Yuto Shinohara	K-1 World GP 2022 in Fukuoka	Fukuoka, Japan	TKO (Low kicks)	2	1:12
2022-02-27	Win	(Japan) Taio Asahisa	K-1 World GP 2022 Japan	Tokyo, Japan	Ext.R Decision (Unanimous)	4	3:00
2021-12-18	Win	(Japan) Hikaru Hasumi	Krush 132	Tokyo, Japan	KO (Left High kick)	2	0:17
2021-03-13	Loss	(Japan) Keijiro Miyakoshi	KNOCK OUT "The REBORN" - 65 kg Black Championship Tournament, Semifinals	Tokyo, Japan	Ext.R Decision (Split)	4	3:00
2020-12-27	Win	(Japan) Tomo Kiire	Japan Kickboxing Innovation Champions Carnival 2020	Tokyo, Japan	KO (Punches)	3	1:42
2020-11-08	Win	(Japan) Masaya Kubo	REBELS 67	Tokyo, Japan	Decision (Unanimous)	3	3:00
2020-02-11	Loss	(Japan) Chihiro Suzuki	KNOCK OUT CHAMPIONSHIP.1 – 64 kg Grand Prix, Quarterfinals	Tokyo, Japan	Decision (Majority)	3	3:00
2019-12-08	Win	(Japan) Tatsuya Inaishi	SNKA SOUL IN THE RING CLIMAX	Tokyo, Japan	Decision (Majority)	3	3:00
2019-10-06	Win	(Japan) Tereka∞	REBELS 63×KNOCK OUT	Tokyo, Japan	Decision (Unanimous)	3	3:00
2019-08-18	Win	(Brazil) Johnny Oliveira	K.O CLIMAX 2019: Summer Kick Fever	Tokyo, Japan	Decision (Unanimous)	3	3:00
2019-07-15	Win	(Japan) Volcano Imoto	Japanese Kickboxing Innovation Join Forces 14	Tokyo, Japan	KO (Middle kick)	1	2:30
2019-06-09	Win	(Japan) Yoshiki	REBELS 61	Tokyo, Japan	Decision (Split)	3	3:00
2019-05-19	Win	(Japan) Tatsuro Fukui	Japanese Kickboxing Innovation Join Forces 13	Tokyo, Japan	TKO (Doctor Stoppage)	1	3:00
2019-03-31	Win	(Japan) Masahiro Kojika	Japanese Kickboxing Innovation Join Forces 12	Tokyo, Japan	TKO (3 Knockdowns)	2	2:38
Legend: Win Loss Draw/No contest Notes

== See also ==
- List of male kickboxers
