= Riku Anpo =

Japanese kickboxer

- Born: 安保 璃紅; September 9, 1997 (age 29); Himeji, Japan
- Nationality: Japanese
- Height: 174 cm (5 ft 9 in)
- Weight: 57.5 kg (127 lb; 9.05 st)
- Style: Kickboxing, Karate
- Stance: Orthodox
- Fighting out of: Osaka, Japan
- Team: KRB Gym (2012-2015); TRY HARD (2016-2017); ALL-WIN (2018-present)
- Years active: 2014 - present

Kickboxing record
- Total: 13
- Wins: 9
- By knockout: 5
- Losses: 4
- By knockout: 1

Other information
- Notable relatives: Rukiya Anpo (brother)

Riku Anpo (Japanese: 安保璃紅, Anpo Riku; born September 9, 1997) is a Japanese kickboxer, currently competing in the featherweight division of K-1. He is the former Krush Super Featherweight champion.

== Kickboxing career ==
=== Super featherweight ===
Anpo made his professional debut against Takayuki Tsujita at HOOST CUP KINGS WEST on November 16, 2014. He won the fight by a first-round knockout. Anpo made his next HOOST CUP appearance against Takuya Taira at HOOST CUP SPIRIT5 on March 1, 2015. He once again won the fight by a first-round stoppage.

Anpo made his Krush debut opposite Yuki Miwa at Krush.69 on September 30, 2016. He won the fight by a first-round knockout. Anpo next faced Tatsuya Inaishi at Krush.71 on December 18, 2016. He won the fight by majority decision, with two judges scoring the bout 30–29 in his favor, while the third judge scored the bout as an even 29–29 draw.

Anpo faced Leona Pettas for the vacant Krush Super Featherweight title at Krush.76 on May 28, 2017, in the finals of the 2017 Krush Super Featherweight tournament. Anpo had earned his place in the tournament finals with a first-round knockout of Masahiro Yamamoto in the quarterfinals and a decision victory over Masanobu Goshu in the semifinals. He achieved his career-best win, as he beat Pettas by unanimous decision, with two scorecards of 30–28 and one scorecard of 30–29.

Anpo made his first Krush title defense against Masanobu Goshu at Krush.81 on October 1, 2017. He lost the fight by split decision.

Anpo faced Hayato at Krush.89 on June 30, 2018. He won the fight by unanimous decision, with scores of 30–29, 30–28 and 30–29.

On December 8, 2018, Riku lost his K-1 debut at the K-1 World GP 2018: K-1 Lightweight World Tournament event when Taio Asahisa beat him by Unanimous decision. He suffered a late third round knock down.

=== Featherweight ===
Anpo stayed inactive for most of the 2019 year due to injuries sustained in training. On November 24 he participated in the K-1 Featherweight World Grand Prix and lost by KO in the first round to Jawsuayai Sor.Dechaphan in quarter final. He lost in the first round, due to a body shot knockout.

=== Lightweight ===
Anpo was expected to face Shoya at Krush 139 on July 30, 2022, in what was supposed to be his lightweight debut and his first fight in 32 months. He was forced to withdraw from the bout at the official weigh-ins however, as he was diagnosed with hypokalemia caused by the weight cut.

Anpo faced Koya Saito in a super lightweight (-65 kg) bout at Bigbang 46 on June 18, 2023. He lost the fight by unanimous decision.

== Titles and accomplishments ==
Amateur

- All Japan Glove Karate Federation
  - 2008 All Japan Glove Karate Federation Elementary School Championship
  - 2009 All Japan Glove Karate Federation Elementary School Championship and Skill Award
- King of Strikers
  - 2012 Kings of Strikers -50 kg Championship

Professional

- Krush
  - 2017 Krush Super Featherweight Tournament Winner
  - 2017 Krush Super Featherweight Championship

== Kickboxing record ==
Professional Kickboxing Record
10 Wins (5 (T)KO's), 4 Losses, 0 Draw, 0 No Contest
Date	Result	Opponent	Event	Location	Method	Round	Time
2023-12-17	Win	(Japan) YUYA	Rumble vol.2	Nagoya, Japan	Ext.R Decision	2	1:30
2023-06-18	Loss	(Japan) Koya Saito	Bigbang 46	Tokyo, Japan	Decision (Unanimous)	3	3:00
2019-11-24	Loss	(Thailand) Jawsuayai Sor.Dechaphan	K-1 World GP 2019 Yokohamatsuri -57.5 kg Championship Tournament Quarter Final	Yokohama, Japan	KO (Flying knee + left hook)	1	1:14
2018-12-08	Loss	(Japan) Taio Asahisa	K-1 World GP 2018: K-1 Lightweight World's Best Tournament	Osaka, Japan	Decision (Unanimous)	3	3:00
2018-09-30	Win	(Japan) Takuma Kawaguchi	Krush.93	Tokyo, Japan	TKO (Towel thrown)	3	1:53
2018-06-30	Win	(Japan) Hayato	Krush.89	Tokyo, Japan	Decision (Unanimous)	3	3:00
2017-10-01	Loss	(Japan) Masanobu Goshu	Krush.81	Tokyo, Japan	Decision (Split)	3	3:00
Loses the Krush Super Featherweight title.
2017-05-28	Win	(Japan) Leona Pettas	Krush.76, Tournament Final	Tokyo, Japan	Decision (Unanimous)	3	3:00
Wins the vacant Krush Super Featherweight title.
2017-04-02	Win	(Japan) Masanobu Goshu	Krush.75, Tournament Semifinal	Tokyo, Japan	Decision (Unanimous)	3	3:00
2017-02-18	Win	(Japan) Masahiro Yamamoto	Krush.73, Tournament Quarterfinal	Tokyo, Japan	KO (3 Knockdowns/Punches)	1	2:06
2016-12-18	Win	(Japan) Tatsuya Inaishi	Krush.71	Tokyo, Japan	Decision (Majority)	3	3:00
2016-09-30	Win	(Japan) Yuki Miwa	Krush.69	Tokyo, Japan	KO (Punches)	2	2:52
2015-03-01	Win	(Japan) Takuya Taira	HOOST CUP SPIRIT5	Kyoto, Japan	KO (High kick)	1	2:40
2014-11-16	Win	(Japan) Takayuki Tsujita	HOOST CUP KINGS WEST	Osaka, Japan	KO (Knee to the body)	1	1:40
Legend: Win Loss Draw/No contest Notes

Amateur Kickboxing Record
Date	Result	Opponent	Event	Location	Method	Round	Time
2013-05-26	Win	(Japan) Takuto Asahi	GLADIATOR 56	Hyōgo Prefecture, Japan	TKO	1	1:50
2013-03-31	Draw	(Japan) Rikuto Adachi	Chakuriki Gold Rush in RKS	Osaka, Japan	Decision	2	2:00
2012-11-18	Loss	(Japan) Shinichiro Morishita	KJC Junior Kick Tournament, Final	Osaka, Japan	Decision (Unanimous)	2	2:00
For the KJC Jr Cruiserweight title.
2012-11-18	Win	(Japan) Naoki Takahashi	KJC Junior Kick Tournament, Semi Final	Osaka, Japan	Decision	2	2:00
2012-11-18	Win	(Japan) Matsumoto	KJC Junior Kick Tournament, Quarter Final	Osaka, Japan	Decision	2	2:00
2012-07-05	Win	(Japan) Kaito Hayashi	Kanto vs Kansai Battle	Japan	Decision	2	2:00
2012-05-20	Loss	(Japan) Shiori Morishita	KJC Junior Kick 2	Osaka, Japan	Decision (Unanimous)	2	2:00
2012-03-11	Draw	(Japan) Naoki Takahashi	KJC Junior Kick 1	Osaka, Japan	Decision	2	2:00
2012-01-29	Win	(Japan) Naoki Yamamoto	KING OF STRIKERS Round 7	Fukuoka Prefecture, Japan	Decision	3	2:00
Wins the Kings of Strikers Jr -50kg title.
2011-10-10	Loss	(Japan) Hiroyoshi Matsuoka	KJC Junior Kick 2	Fukuoka Prefecture, Japan	Decision	1	2:00
2011-07-03	Win	(Japan) Yoshiki Takei	Muay Thai WINDY Super Fight in NAGOYA ～Muay Typhoon!～	Nagoya, Japan	Decision (Unanimous)	2	1:30
2011-05-04	Win	(Japan) Hiyuu Asada	MISSION 21	Osaka, Japan	Decision (Unanimous)	2	1:30
2011-04-17	Loss	(Japan) Shiori Morishita	CRAZY KING vol.3	Hyōgo Prefecture, Japan	Decision	3	3:00
2010-04-25	Win	(Japan) Tsubasa Seita	NEXT LEVEL AJKF Amateur	Okayama Prefecture, Japan	Decision (Unanimous)	2	2:00
Legend: Win Loss Draw/No contest Notes

== See also ==
- List of male kickboxers
- List of Krush champions
