= Taio Asahisa =

Japanese kickboxer

- Born: 朝久 泰央; January 16, 1998 (age 28); Ukiha, Fukuoka, Japan
- Other names: Karate Android
- Height: 174 cm (5 ft 9 in)
- Weight: 65 kg (143 lb; 10.2 st)
- Division: Bantamweight
- Style: Asahisa Ryuyouga Karate
- Stance: Orthodox
- Fighting out of: Fukuoka, Japan
- Team: Asahisa Dojo
- Trainer: Atsushi Asahisa
- Rank: Black belt in Asahisa Karate
- Years active: 2014 - present

Kickboxing record
- Total: 34
- Wins: 25
- By knockout: 6
- Losses: 9
- By knockout: 0

Other information
- Notable relatives: Hirotaka Asahisa (brother)

Taio Asahisa (born 16 January 1998) is a Japanese kickboxer, currently fighting in the lightweight division of K-1, where he is the former lightweight champion. He is the current K-1 Super Lightweight champion.

As of May 2021, he was the #1 ranked -64 kg kickboxer in the world according to Combat Press.

== Kickboxing career ==
=== Super Bantamweight career ===
Asahisa was schooled in Asahisa karate by his father, who had developed the style, and participated in numerous amateur karate and kickboxing competitions from a young age. He was most notably eliminated from the All Japan Junior Kick competitions two years in a row by Tenshin Nasukawa, and by Ren Hiramoto in the first round of the 2014 K-1 Koshien tournament.

Asahisa made his professional debut on September 21, 2014, at the age of 16, being scheduled to fight Masachika Morimoto in the quarterfinals of the 2014 J-Fight Next Generation Cup. He beat Morimoto by unanimous decision, winning the fight by 20-18 on two of the three judges scorecards. Advancing to the semifinals, Asahisa faced Takaya Ogura. He managed to knock Ogura down late in the first round, and won by technical knockout nine seconds into the second round. Asahisa fought the WPMF Japan Bantamweight champion Teru in the finals and won the fight by unanimous decision. Aside from winning the tournament title, Asahisa was awarded ¥300,000 in prize money.

Asahisa was scheduled to make his K-1 debut against Namito Izawa at Krush 49. The fight was ruled as a draw, after the first three rounds of the bout, and went into an extra extension round. Izawa won the extra round of all three of the judges scorecards. Asahisa was scheduled to make his second promotional appearance against Chikara Iwao at Krush 54. He achieved his first win with the promotion by majority decision. Asahisa lost his next fight against Keisuke Ishida by unanimous decision, with Ishida clearly winning two of the three rounds of the bout.

Asahisa moved away from K-1 for his next two fights. He would win a decision against Chibita at Pound for Pound vol.5 and lose a decision against Kim Sang-Jae at MAX FC. He returned to K-1 to face Haruma Saikyo at K-1 World GP 2016 -65kg World Tournament. Saikyo was the more dominant party in the first round, while Asahisa was more successful in pressuring Saikyo in the second and third round. Saikyo won the fight by majority decision, with two of the judges awarding him a 30-29 scorecard.

=== Super Featherweight career ===
==== First Krush Super Featherweight tournament ====
For his next fight, Asahisa moved up from Krush's super bantamweight (55 kg) category up to super featherweight (60 kg), having amassed a 5-4 record at 55 kg. He was scheduled to fight Fumiya Osawa at Krush 70. Asahsisa won the closely contested fight by majority decision.

Following his successful divisional debut, Asahisa took part in the Krush Super Featherweight tournament. He was scheduled to face Sano Tenma at Krush 73, in the tournament quarterfinals. Asahisa won the fight by unanimous decision. Two months later, Asahisa fought Leona Pettas in the tournament semifinals, and lost by a dominant unanimous decision (30-27, 29-27, 29-27). Asahisa suffered the first knockdown of his professional career in the first round of the fight.

==== Chinese circuit ====
After a loss to Wang Wanben at Wu Lin Feng 2017 World Championship Xi'an, Asahisa returned to K-1 to fight the one-time Krush Featherweight title challenger Tatsuya Oiwa at Krush 82. Asahisa won the fight by unanimous decision, managing to knock down Oiwa in the first round. Asahisa was next scheduled to fight Shue Shenzheng at the Wu Lin Feng 2018: -60kg World Championship Tournament, in a reserve bout of a WLF 60 kg bout. He won the fight by decision. Asahisa extended his winning streak to three with a dominant unanimous decision victory over Yuzuki Satomi at Krush 91.

Asahisa was scheduled to make his return to K-1 at K-1 World GP 2018: K-1 Lightweight World Tournament, being scheduled to fight the former Krush Featherweight champion Riku Anpo. After a slow start in the first round, Asahisa began to build momentum from the second round onwards, managing to knock Anpo down in the dying seconds of the last round. Asahisa would win the fight by a unanimous decision, with two of the three judges scoring the bout 30-26 in his favor.

==== Second Krush Super Featherweight tournament ====
Asahisa once again took part in a Krush Super Featherweight tournament, with the quarterfinal bout being held at Krush 98. He was scheduled to fight a rematch with the Leona Pettas. Although the fight was closer than their first meeting, Pettas nonetheless won the bout by unanimous decision, eliminating Asahisa in the first round of the tournament.

Asahisa rebounded from his second loss to Pettas with a unanimous decision victory against Naoki Yamamoto at Krush 101. He was afterwards scheduled to fight Tomoya Yokoyama at Krush 104. Asahisa had a slow start to the fight, with all three judges scoring the first round as a draw. Asahisa built momentum as the fight went on, winning the bout by unanimous decision. Asahisa's last fight at 60 kg was against Narufumi Nishimoto at Krush 107. He won the fight by a second-round knockout, dropping Nishimoto with a left body kick in the last minute of the second round.

=== Lightweight career ===
==== Asahisa vs. Hayashi ====
Asahisa stepped in on a four days notice to fight the reigning K-1 Lightweight champion Kenta Hayashi at K-1 World GP 2020: K’Festa 3. Hayashi was originally scheduled to fight Shuai Zhu, before the fight was cancelled due to the COVID-19 pandemic. The replacement opponent, Kim Falk, was likewise later removed from the card and replaced by Asahisa for the same reason. Asahisa weighed in 2.2 kg lighter than his opponent and came into the fight as a significant underdog. Hayashi was at the time considered to be the best kickboxer under 65 kg. During the first round of the bout, Asahisa fought on the outside and attempted to keep distance from the advancing Hayashi. 41 seconds into the second round, however, Asahisa landed a jumping switch kick which resulted in a knockdown. Asahisa pressured after the fight resumed, scoring a second knockdown at the 1:44 minute mark of the second round. Although he failed to score the third knockdown, Asahisa was in control of the remainder of the fight, winning the unanimous decision by a wide margin. Two of the three judges scored the fight 30-26 in his favor, while the third judge scored the fight 29-26 in his favor. His victory over the world's best lightweight at the time was considered a massive upset. During the press conference, Asahisa stated he would move up to lightweight permanently, and further expressed his desire to fight for the K-1 Lightweight title.

==== Hiroki and Hasumi bouts ====
Asahisa was scheduled to fight Hiroki at K-1 World GP 2020 in Osaka, in his second fight at lightweight. Asahisa defeated Hiroki by second round high kick knockout, having been knocked down in the first round. Combat Press would later awarded Asahisa "Knockout of the Year" honors for this knockout. Asahisa was scheduled to fight Hikaru Hasumi at K-1 World GP 2020 Winter's Crucial Bout. During the third round, Asahisa injured Hasumi's knee with an inside leg kick. This was quickly followed by a knee to Hasumi's body, which resulted in a knockdown. Despite Hasumi standing up in time for the eight-count, the referee decided to stop the fight.

==== K-1 Lightweight champion ====
Asahisa was scheduled to fight the reigning K-1 Lightweight champion Gonnapar Weerasakreck at K-1 World GP 2021 in Fukuoka. Asahisa had previously beat Kenta Hayashi, then the K-1 Lightweight champion, in a non-title bout, while Gonnapar became the champion after dethroning Hayashi at K-1 World GP 2020 Winter's Crucial Bout. At the time of the bout's scheduling, Asahisa and Gonnapar were considered the #1 and #2 ranked fighters under 64 kg. Following a closely contested three rounds, the fight was declared a majority draw. Two of the judges scored it an even 29-29, while the third judge scored it 29-28 in favor of Asahisa. Accordingly, an extra round was fought, after which Asahisa was awarded a split decision.

Asahisa faced Yuki Yoza in a non-title bout at K-1 World GP 2022 Japan on February 27, 2022. The fight was ruled a draw after the first three rounds, with two judges scoring the bout an even 30–30 draw, while the third judge scored the bout 30–28 in favor of Yoza. An extension round was therefore contested, after which Yoza was awarded the unanimous decision victory.

Asahisa made his first K-1 Lightweight title defense against Yuki Yoza at K-1 World GP 2023: K'Festa 6 on March 12, 2023, in what was an immediate rematch of his upset loss to Yoza the previous year. He lost the fight by unanimous decision, with two scorecards of 30–29 and one scorecard of 30–28. During a post-fight interview, Asahisa revealed he had suffered a right hand fracture before the bout took place, which was exacerbated in the second round.

Asahisa made his Rizin Fighting Federation debut on December 31, 2024, at Rizin 49: Decade against YURA. He won the fight by unanimous decision in a bout where both athletes received an eight count.

Asahisa faced Danila Kvach at K-1 Dontaku on July 13, 2025. He won the fight by majority decision.

=== Super lightweight career ===
Asahisa moved up to super lightweight (-65 kg) following his victory over Danila Kvach and was booked to face the reigning Krush super lightweight champion Shu Inagaki for the vacant K-1 Super Lightweight (-65kg) title at K-1 World MAX 2025 - 70kg World Championship Tournament Final on November 15, 2025. He won the fight by majority decision, with scores of 30—29, 29—29 and 30—28.

== Titles and accomplishments ==
- K-1
  - 2021 K-1 Lightweight Champion
  - 2025 K-1 Super Lightweight (-65kg) Champion
    - One successful title defense
- J-NETWORK
  - 2014 J-Network Next Generation Cup -55 kg winner

Awards

- Combat Press
  - 2020 Combat Press Knockout of the Year
- eFight
  - July 2021 eFight.com Fighter of the Month
- K-1
  - 2021 K-1 Outstanding Performance Award
  - 2024 K-1 Fans Favorite Award
- Beyond Kickboxing
  - Beyond Kickboxing's 2024 Fight of the Year (vs. YURA)

== Kickboxing record ==
Professional kickboxing record
25 wins (6 (T)KOs), 9 losses, 0 draws, 0 no contests
Date	Result	Opponent	Event	Location	Method	Round	Time
2026-09-12	Win	(Senegal) Alassane Kamara	K-1 World MAX 2026 - World Tournament Opening Round	Tokyo, Japan	Decision (unanimous)	3	3:00
Defends the K-1 Super Lightweight (-65kg) title.
2026-04-12	Win	(Thailand) Singphayak HamaGym	Rizin Landmark 13	Fukuoka, Japan	KO (straight to the body)	1	1:47
2025-11-15	Win	(Japan) Shu Inagaki	K-1 World MAX 2025 - 70kg World Championship Tournament Final	Tokyo, Japan	Decision (majority)	3	3:00
Wins the vacant K-1 Super Lightweight (-65kg) title.
2025-07-13	Win	(Belarus) Danila Kvach	K-1 Dontaku	Fukuoka, Japan	Decision (majority)	3	3:00
2025-05-04	Win	(Japan) Yoshiya Uzatsuyo	Rizin: Otoko Matsuri	Tokyo, Japan	KO (high kick)	2	1:15
2024-12-31	Win	(Japan) YURA	Rizin 49: Decade	Saitama, Japan	Decision (unanimous)	3	3:00
2024-10-25	Win	(Japan) Ryuka	Krush 166	Tokyo, Japan	Decision (majority)	3	3:00
2023-03-12	Loss	(Japan) Yuki Yoza	K-1 World GP 2023: K'Festa 6	Tokyo, Japan	Decision (unanimous)	3	3:00
For the K-1 Lightweight (-62.5kg) title.
2022-02-27	Loss	(Japan) Yuki Yoza	K-1 World GP 2022 Japan	Tokyo, Japan	Ext.R decision (unanimous)	4	3:00
2021-07-17	Win	(Thailand) Kongnapa Weerasakreck	K-1 World GP 2021 in Fukuoka	Fukuoka, Japan	Ext.R decision (split)	4	3:00
Wins the K-1 Lightweight (-62.5kg) title.
2020-12-13	Win	(Japan) Hikaru Hasumi	K-1 World GP 2020 Winter's Crucial Bout	Tokyo, Japan	KO (knee to the body)	3	1:48
2020-09-22	Win	(Japan) Hiroki	K-1 World GP 2020 in Osaka	Osaka, Japan	KO (left high kick)	2	0:56
2020-03-22	Win	(Japan) Kenta Hayashi	K-1 World GP 2020: K’Festa 3	Saitama, Japan	Decision (unanimous)	3	3:00
2019-11-08	Win	(Japan) Narufumi Nishimoto	Krush 107	Tokyo, Japan	KO (left body kick)	2	2:21
2019-08-31	Win	(Japan) Tomoya Yokoyama	Krush 104	Tokyo, Japan	Decision (unanimous)	3	3:00
2019-05-18	Win	(Japan) Naoki Yamamoto	Krush.101	Tokyo, Japan	Decision (unanimous)	3	3:00
2019-02-16	Loss	(Japan) Leona Pettas	Krush.98, Super Featherweight Championship Tournament Quarter Final	Tokyo, Japan	Decision (unanimous)	3	3:00
2018-12-08	Win	(Japan) Riku Anpo	K-1 World GP 2018: K-1 Lightweight World's Best Tournament	Osaka, Japan	Decision (unanimous)	3	3:00
2018-08-05	Win	(Japan) Yuzuki Satomi	Krush.91	Tokyo, Japan	Decision (unanimous)	3	3:00
2018-03-10	Win	(China) Shue Shenzheng	Wu Lin Feng 2018: -60kg World Championship Tournament	Jiaozuo, China	Decision (unanimous)	3	3:00
2017-11-05	Win	(Japan) Tatsuya Oiwa	Krush.82	Tokyo, Japan	Decision (unanimous)	3	3:00
2017-09-02	Loss	(China) Wang Wanben	Wu Lin Feng 2017 World Championship Xi'an	Jiaozuo, China	Decision	3	3:00
2017-04-02	Loss	(Japan) Leona Pettas	Krush.75, Tournament Semifinal	Tokyo, Japan	Decision (unanimous)	3	3:00
2017-02-18	Win	(Japan) Sano Tenma	Krush.73, Tournament Quarterfinal	Tokyo, Japan	Decision (unanimous)	3	3:00
2016-10-15	Win	(Japan) Fumiya Osawa	Krush.70	Tokyo, Japan	Decision (majority)	3	3:00
2016-06-24	Loss	(Japan) Haruma Saikyo	K-1 World GP 2016 -65kg World Tournament	Tokyo, Japan	Decision (majority)	3	3:00
2016-03-26	Loss	(Korea) Kim Sang-Jae	MAX FC	Seoul, South Korea	Decision	3	3:00
2015-11-07	Win	(Japan) Chibita	Pound for Pound vol.5	Kyushu, Japan	Decision	3	3:00
2015-10-04	Loss	(Japan) Keisuke Ishida	Krush.59	Tokyo, Japan	Decision (unanimous)	3	3:00
2015-05-04	Win	(Japan) Chikara Iwao	Krush.54	Tokyo, Japan	Decision (majority)	3	3:00
2015-01-04	Loss	(Japan) Namito Izawa	Krush.49	Tokyo, Japan	Ext.R decision (unanimous)	4	3:00
2014-09-21	Win	(Japan) Teru	J-FIGHT in Shinjuku vol.39 - Next Generation Cup, Final	Tokyo, Japan	Decision (unanimous)	2	3:00
Wins J-Network Next Generation Cup -55kg title.
2014-09-21	Win	(Japan) Takaya Ogura	J-FIGHT in Shinjuku vol.39 - Next Generation Cup, Semi Final	Tokyo, Japan	TKO	2	0:09
2014-09-21	Win	(Japan) Masachika Morimoto	J-FIGHT in Shinjuku vol.39 - Next Generation Cup, Quarter Final	Tokyo, Japan	Decision (unanimous)	2	3:00
Legend: Win Loss Draw/no contest Notes

=== Amateur record ===
Amateur kickboxing record
Date	Result	Opponent	Event	Location	Method	Round	Time
2014-07-21	Loss	(Japan) Ren Hiramoto	K-1 Koshien 2014 Tournament, First Round	Tokyo, Japan	Decision	1	2:00
2013-12	Win	(Japan) Yushi	Pound for Pound Vol.3	Kyushu, Japan	Decision	2	3:00
2013-07-20	Win	(Japan) Ikki Muramatsu	Pound for Pound Vol.2	Kyushu, Japan	Decision	2	3:00
2013-03-31	Loss	(Japan) Tenshin Nasukawa	2013 All Japan Jr. Kick Tournament, Semi Final	Tokyo, Japan	Decision	2	2:00
2013-03-31	Win	(Japan)	2013 All Japan Jr. Kick Tournament, Quarter Final	Tokyo, Japan	Decision	2	2:00
2012-09-30	Win	(Japan) Naruse Kodama	M-1 Kyushu	Kyushu, Japan	TKO	1	1:18
2012-04-15	Loss	(Japan) Tenshin Nasukawa	2012 All Japan Jr. Kick Tournament, Quarter Final	Tokyo, Japan	Decision	2	2:00
2012-03-04	Win	(Japan) Takaaki Yamamoto	2012 All Japan Jr. Kick Kyushu Selection Tournament, Final	Kyushu, Japan	Decision	2	2:00
2011-10-15	Win	(Japan)	GP	Kyushu, Japan	KO		
2011-09-17	Win	(Japan)	GP	Kyushu, Japan	KO	1	1:58
2011-06-19	Loss	(Japan) Katsuki Nogami	M-1 Muay Thai Amateur Kyushu, Final	Kyushu, Japan	Decision	2	2:00
2011-06-19	Win	(Japan) Hino Nakagawa	M-1 Muay Thai Amateur Kyushu, Semi Final	Kyushu, Japan	Decision	2	2:00
2011-01-10	Loss	(Japan) Naruse Kodama	M-1 Muay Thai Amateur Kyushu	Kyushu, Japan	Decision	2	2:00
Legend: Win Loss Draw/no contest Notes

== See also ==
- List of male kickboxers
- List of K-1 champions
