= Shintaro Matsukura =

Japanese kickboxer

- Born: 松倉信太郎; November 12, 1991 (age 34); Miami, United States of America
- Height: 178 cm (5 ft 10 in)
- Weight: 80 kg (180 lb; 13 st)
- Style: Kickboxing
- Stance: Orthodox
- Fighting out of: Tokyo, Japan
- Team: Team Vasileus (2022-Present); TRY HARD (2014-2022); BungelingBay Spirit (2007-2014)

Kickboxing record
- Total: 58
- Wins: 38
- By knockout: 19
- Losses: 20

Shintaro Matsukura is a Japanese kickboxer fighting out of Tokyo, Japan.

== Career ==
On March 2, 2008 Matsukura participated to the K-1 tryouts, he passed every steps and was selected by the officials including K-1 youth development director Kensaku Maeda.

Matsukura turned professional on July 20, 2008 at the MAJKF BREAK THROUGH 5 event. He was defeated by unanimous decision against Kenichi Hashimoto. Matsukura returned to amateur competition when he participated to the 2009 K-1 Koshien -70 kg tournament. Matsukura won the tournament, defeating three opponents in the same day.

On March 27, 2010 Matsukura faced Yuuki at K-1 WORLD MAX 2010 ～-70 kg Japan Tournament～. He won the fight by knockout in the second round after flooring his opponent three times.

In 2010 Matsukura participated to the annual New Year's eve event of Japanese combat sport combining MMA and kickboxing called World Victory Road Presents: Soul of Fight. He lost to Yusuke Ike by knockout in the second round.

On July 7, 2011 Matsukura took part in a one night 4-man tournament for the inaugural Krush Championship. He lost in the semi-final against Yutaro Yamauchi by split decision after an extra round. On September 25, 2011 Matsukura faced Yuya Yamamoto in the quarter-final of the K-1 MAX Japan 70 kg Tournament. He lost the fight by unanimous decision.

On September 9, 2012 Matsukura took part in the Krush Youth Grand Prix at 70 kg. In a fight serving as the semi-final bout he defeated Kazuya Akimoto by extra round knockout. The final happened at Krush 24 on November 10, Matsukura Taisei Kondo by extra round knockout to win the Grand Prix.

On January 14, 2013 Matsukura took part in the Krush Grand Prix 2013. In the quarter-final bout he defeated Keita Makihira by unanimous decision. In the semi-final he lost Yuta Kubo by unanimous decision.

Matsukura faced Yoshihiro Sato at Krush. 2 in Nagoya on September 1, 2013. He lost by unanimous decision.

On November 3, 2014 Matsukura was booked against Jiao Fukai on the first event of the version of K-1 at K-1 World GP 2014 -65kg Championship Tournament. He wno the fight by unanimous decision.

On February 6, 2015 Matsukura took part in a Krush tournament for the vacant 70 kg title. He lost in the semi-final to Hiroki Nakajima by unanimous decision.

On April 24, 2016 Matsukura faced Kazuya Akimoto at K-1 World GP 2016 -60kg Japan Tournament. He was defeated by majority decision.

On December 3, 2016 Matsukura traveled to China to compete on Wu Lin Feng 2016: WLF x Krush - China vs Japan. He defeated Zhao Yan by unanimous decision.

On February 25, 2017 Matsukura faced Hinata at K-1 World GP 2017 Lightweight Championship Tournament. He lost the fight by unanimous decision.

On March 11, 2018 Matsukura took part in the 2018 Kunlun Fight 70 kg World Championship qualifying tournament at Kunlun Fight 70. In the semi-final bout he lost to Hu Yafei by majority decision.

On June 18, 2018 Matsukura made his RISE promotional debut at RISE 125. He lost to Lee Sung-hyun by extra round unanimous decision.

On July 5, 2019 Matsukura rematched Lee Sung-hyun for the vacant RISE Middleweight title. He lost the fight by unanimous decision after five rounds.

On September 19, 2020 Matsukura faced Kouki for the vacant WPMF World Super Middleweight title at Suk Wan Kingtong "Go for the top". Matsukura won by knockout in the first round to become the new champion.

On March 13, 2021 Matsukura took part in the KNOCK Black inaugural Middleweight championship tournament. He defeated Kohei Tokeshi by first round knockout in the semi-final. In the final happening on July 18 at KNOCK OUT 2021 vol.3 Matsukura defeated Hijiri Tamura by unanimous decision to capture the title.

On March 3, 2022 it was announced Matsukura relinquished the KNOCK OUT Black Middleweight title following his departure from TRY HARD Gym and signature to the K-1 promotion. For his return to K-1 Matsukura faced Julio Cesar Mori at K-1: K'Festa 5 on April 3, 2022. He won the fight by unanimous decision.

Matsukura faced Katsuya Jinbo at K-1 World GP 2022 Yokohamatsuri on September 11, 2022. He lost the fight by a fourth-round knockout.

Matsukura faced Igor Silva at K-1 World GP 2023: K'Festa 6 on March 12, 2023. He won the fight by a second-round knockout.

On September 2, 2025, it was announced Matsukura"s contract with K-1 had come to an end.

== Titles and accomplishments ==
=== Professional ===
- K-1
  - 2023 K-1 World Middleweight Grand Prix Runner-up
  - 2023 K-1 Middleweight (-75kg) Champion
- KNOCK OUT
  - 2021 KNOCK OUT Black Super Middleweight Champion
- World Professional Muaythai Federation
  - 2020 WPMF World Super Middleweight Champion
- Krush
  - 2012 Krush Youth GP -70 kg Champion

=== Amateur ===
- K-1
  - 2009 K-1 Koshien Tournament -70 kg Champion

== Fight record ==
Professional Kickboxing & Muay Thai Record
38 Wins (19 (T)KO's), 20 Losses, 0 Draw, 0 No Contest
Date	Result	Opponent	Event	Location	Method	Round	Time
2026-10-17	Loss	(Thailand) Sinsamut Klinmee	ONE Samurai 4	Tokyo, Japan	KO (high kick)	2	1:17
2025-10-30	Loss	(Cameroon) Brice Kombou	Kickboxing Fes. GOAT	Tokyo, Japan	KO (Body punch)	2	1:53
For the ISKA K-1 World Super-middleweight (-78kg) title.
2025-02-09	Win	(South Korea) Park Chung Il	K-1 World MAX 2025	Tokyo, Japan	TKO (Low kicks)	2	1:21
2024-07-07	Win	(Romania) Alexandru Amariței	K-1 World MAX 2024 - World Championship Tournament Final	Tokyo, Japan	Decision (Unanimous)	3	3:00
2023-12-09	Win	(Turkey) Hasan Toy	K-1 ReBIRTH 2	Osaka, Japan	Ext.R Decision (Split)	4	3:00
Wins the K-1 Middleweight (-75kg) title.
2023-06-03	Loss	(Turkey) Hasan Toy	K-1 World GP 2023: inaugural Middleweight Championship Tournament, Final	Yokohama, Japan	KO (Left hook)	1	0:42
For the inaugural K-1 Middleweight (-75kg) title.
2023-06-03	Win	(Italy) Mustapha Haida	K-1 World GP 2023: inaugural Middleweight Championship Tournament, Semi-final	Yokohama, Japan	Decision (Unanimous)	3	3:00
2023-06-03	Win	(Brazil) Vinicius Dionizio	K-1 World GP 2023: inaugural Middleweight Championship Tournament, Quarter-final	Yokohama, Japan	TKO (2 Knockdowns/punches)	1	2:19
2023-03-12	Win	(Brazil) Igor Silva	K-1 World GP 2023: K'Festa 6	Tokyo, Japan	KO (Right cross)	2	2:25
2022-09-11	Loss	(Japan) Katsuya Jinbo	K-1 World GP 2022 Yokohamatsuri	Yokohama, Japan	Ext.R KO (Right cross)	4	2:10
2022-04-03	Win	(Brazil) Julio Cesar Mori	K-1: K'Festa 5	Tokyo, Japan	Decision (Unanimous)	3	3:00
2021-10-29	Win	(United States) Brian McGrath	KNOCK OUT 2021 vol.5	Tokyo, Japan	KO (Left Hook)	2	0:18
2021-07-18	Win	(Japan) Hijiri Tamura	KNOCK OUT 2021 vol.3 - BLACK Rules Championship Tournament, Final	Tokyo, Japan	Decision (Unanimous)	3	3:00
Wins inaugural KNOCK OUT Black Super Middleweight title.
2021-03-13	Win	(Japan) Kohei Tokeshi	KNOCK OUT ～The REBORN～ BLACK Rules Championship Tournament, Semi-final	Tokyo, Japan	KO (Front kick to the Body)	1	
2020-12-06	Win	(Japan) T-98	REBELS 69	Tokyo, Japan	Decision (Unanimous)	3	3:00
2020-09-10	Win	(Japan) Kouki	Suk Wan Kingtong "Go for the top"	Tokyo, Japan	TKO (Punches)	1	1:27
Wins WPMF World Super Middleweight title.
2020-08-10	Win	(Japan) Koji Mori	Rizin 23 – Calling Over	Yokohama, Japan	TKO (Punches)	1	1:28
2020-02-23	Win	(Japan) Seigo Nishimura	RISE 137	Tokyo, Japan	Decision (Unanimous)	3	3:00
2019-07-05	Loss	(Korea) Lee Sung-hyun	RISE 133	Tokyo, Japan	Decision (Unanimous)	5	3:00
For the vacant RISE Middleweight title.
2019-02-03	Win	(Japan) Takafumi Morita	RISE 130	Tokyo, Japan	Decision (Unanimous)	3	3:00
2018-11-02	Win	(Japan) Kensuke Yabunaka	RISE 128	Tokyo, Japan	KO (Left Cross)	2	2:38
2018-08-12	Win	(Japan) Takahiro Okuyama	Rizin 12 - Nagoya	Nagoya, Japan	KO (Right Cross)	2	2:30
2018-06-17	Loss	(Korea) Lee Sung-hyun	RISE 125	Chiba, Japan	Ext.R Decision (Unanimous)	4	3:00
2018-03-11	Loss	(China) Hu Yafei	Kunlun Fight 70	Sanya, China	Decision (Majority)	3	3:00
2017-02-25	Loss	(Japan) Hinata	K-1 World GP 2017 Lightweight Championship Tournament	Tokyo, Japan	Decision (Unanimous)	3	3:00
2016-12-03	Win	(China) Zhao Yan	Wu Lin Feng 2016: WLF x Krush - China vs Japan	Zhengzhou, China	Decision (Unanimous)	3	3:00
2016-09-30	Loss	(Japan) Yu Hirono	Krush 69	Tokyo, Japan	Decision (Unanimous)	3	3:00
2016-07-09	Win	(China) Liu Lei	EM Legend 10	China	Decision	3	3:00
2016-06-05	Win	(Uzbekistan) Naimjon Tukhtaboev	EM Legend 9	Chengdu, China	TKO	3	
2016-04-24	Loss	(Japan) Kazuya Akimoto	K-1 World GP 2016 -60kg Japan Tournament	Tokyo, Japan	Decision (Majority)	3	3:00
2015-12-04	Win	(Japan) Masato Uchiyama	Krush 61	Tokyo, Japan	KO (Left Hook)	2	1:11
2015-09-22	Win	(China) Tian Xin	K-1 World GP 2015 Survival Wars	Tokyo, Japan	Decision (Unanimous)	3	3:00
2015-05-04	Loss	(Japan) TOMOYUKI	Krush 54	Tokyo, Japan	Decision (Majority)	3	3:00
2015-02-06	Loss	(Japan) Hiroki Nakajima	Krush 51, -70 kg Championship Tournament Semi-final	Tokyo, Japan	Decision (Unanimous)	3	3:00
2014-11-03	Win	(China) Jiao Fukai	K-1 World GP 2014 -65kg Championship Tournament	Tokyo, Japan	Decision (Unanimous)	3	3:00
2014-08-09	Win	(Japan) Asami Zaurus	Krush 44	Tokyo, Japan	Decision (Majority)	3	3:00
2014-04-15	Win	(Turkey) Onder Ural	Krush 40	Tokyo, Japan	Decision (Unanimous)	3	3:00
2013-12-14	Win	(Japan) Hideaki Kikawa	Krush 35	Tokyo, Japan	Decision (Unanimous)	3	3:00
2013-09-01	Loss	(Japan) Yoshihiro Sato	Krush 32	Nagoya, Japan	Decision (Unanimous)	3	3:00
2013-05-12	Win	(Japan) Yoichi Yamazaki	Krush 28	Tokyo, Japan	Decision (Majority)	3	3:00
2013-01-14	Loss	(Japan) Yuta Kubo	Krush Grand Prix 2013, Semi-final	Tokyo, Japan	Decision (Unanimous)	3	3:00
2013-01-14	Win	(Japan) Keita Makihira	Krush Grand Prix 2013, Quarter-final	Tokyo, Japan	Decision (Unanimous)	3	3:00
2012-11-10	Win	(Japan) Taisei Kondo	Krush 24, YOUTH GP 2012 –70 kg Final	Tokyo, Japan	Ext.R KO (Right Cross)	4	1:36
Wins Krush Youth GP -70kg title.
2012-09-09	Win	(Japan) Kazuya Akimoto	Krush YOUTH GP 2012 –70 kg Semi-final	Tokyo, Japan	Ext.R KO (Right Cross)	4	
2012-07-21	Loss	(Japan) TOMOYUKI	Krush 20	Tokyo, Japan	Ext.R Decision (Unanimous)	4	3:00
2012-06-03	Win	(Japan) Hareruya	Bigbang 9	Tokyo, Japan	KO (Left Hook to the Body)	2	2:35
2012-03-17	Win	(Japan) Taisei Kondo	Krush 17	Tokyo, Japan	Decision (Unanimous)	3	3:00
2011-12-11	Loss	(Japan) Yasuhiro Kido	Big Bang 7	Tokyo, Japan	KO (spinning backfist)	2	2:24
2011-09-25	Loss	(Japan) Yuya Yamamoto	K-1 World MAX 2011 –70 kg Japan Tournament Quarter-final	Osaka, Japan	Decision (Unanimous)	3	3:00
2011-07-16	Loss	(Japan) Yutaro Yamauchi	Krush -70 kg inaugural Championship Tournament Semi-final	Tokyo, Japan	Ext.R Decision (Split)	4	3:00
2011-05-29	Win	(Japan) Yuya Yamamoto	Krush -70 kg inaugural Championship Tournament Quarter-final	Tokyo, Japan	Decision (Unanimous)	3	3:00
2010-12-30	Loss	(Japan) Yusuke Ikei	World Victory Road Presents: Soul of Fight	Tokyo, Japan	KO (Left Knee)	2	0:48
2010-05-27	Win	(Japan) Masato Uchiyama	Krush.7	Tokyo, Japan	KO (Right Cross)	3	1:09
2010-03-27	Win	(Japan) Yuuki	K-1 WORLD MAX 2010 ～-70 kg Japan Tournament～	Saitama, Japan	KO (3 Knockdowns/Punches)	2	1:48
2009-11-27	Win	(Japan) Yudate Nagawa	J-NETWORK GET REAL in J-WORLD FINAL ～Invading	Tokyo, Japan	KO (Punches)	1	1:43
2008-08-29	Win	(Japan) Christopher Nishizawa	K-1 KOSHIEN KING OF UNDER 18 ～FINAL16～	Tokyo, Japan	KO (2 Knockdowns/Knee)	3	2:05
2008-07-20	Loss	(Japan) Kenichi Hashimoto	MAJKF BREAK THROUGH-5	Tokyo, Japan	Decision (Unanimous)	3	3:00
Legend: Win Loss Draw/No contest Notes

Amateur Kickboxing Record
Date	Result	Opponent	Event	Location	Method	Round	Time
2009-08-10	Win	(Japan) Mitsuki Saito	K-1 Koshien FINAL 16, Final	Tokyo, Japan	Ext.R TKO (Doctor Stoppage)	2	0:46
Wins 2009 K-1 Koshien -70kg title.
2009-08-10	Win	(Japan) Masaya Matsuhana	K-1 Koshien FINAL 16, Semi-final	Tokyo, Japan	Decision (Unanimous)	1	2:00
2009-08-10	Win	(Japan) Taichi Sato	K-1 Koshien FINAL 16, Quarter-final	Tokyo, Japan	Decision (Unanimous)	1	2:00
2009-06-28	Win	(Japan) Akihiro Nakamura	K-1 Koshien Kanto Region	Tokyo, Japan	Decision (Unanimous)		2:00
Legend: Win Loss Draw/No contest Notes
