= 2023 in K-1 =

Mixed martial arts events

Information
- First date: March 12, 2023
- Last date: December 9, 2023

Events
- Total events: 5

The year 2023 is the 30th year in the history of the K-1, a Japanese kickboxing promotion. The year began with K-1 World GP 2023: K'Festa 6.

2023 would be K-1's first full year under M-1 Sports Media, which annouced it had acquired worldwide rights to the K-1 brand from previous owners K-1 Global Holdings Limited on February 28.

== List of events ==
#	Event title	Date	Arena	Location
1	K-1 World GP 2023: K'Festa 6	March 12, 2023	Yoyogi National Gymnasium	Tokyo, Japan
2	K-1 World GP 2023: inaugural Middleweight Championship Tournament	June 3, 2023	Yokohama Budokan	Yokohama, Japan
3	K-1 World GP 2023 at Ryogoku	July 17, 2023	Ryōgoku Kokugikan	Tokyo, Japan
4	ReBOOT～K-1 ReBIRTH～	September 10, 2023	Yokohama Arena	Yokohama, Japan
5	K-1 ReBIRTH 2	December 9, 2023	Edion Arena	Osaka, Japan

== K-1 World GP 2023: K'Festa 6 ==
K-1 World GP 2023: K'Festa 6
- Promotion: K-1
- Date: March 12, 2023
- Venue: Yoyogi National Gymnasium
- City: Tokyo, Japan

K-1 World GP 2023: K'Festa 6 was a kickboxing event held by K-1 on March 12, 2023, at the Yoyogi National Gymnasium in Tokyo, Japan.

=== Background ===
Four K-1 title fights were announced for the event on January 13, 2023: A K-1 Super Bantamweight Championship bout between champion Akihiro Kaneko and challenger Kompetch Sitsarawatsuer; a K-1 Women's Atomweight Championship bout between champion Phayahong Ayothayafightgym and challenger Miyuu Sugawara; a K-1 Lightweight Championship bout between champion Taio Asahisa and challenger Yuki Yoza; as well as a K-1 Super Welterweight Championship bout between champion Hiromi Wajima and challenger Jomthong Chuwattana.

Three additional title fights were added on January 27: Tetsuya Yamato was booked to make his second K-1 World GP Super Lightweight Championship defense against the former K-1 Lightweight champion Kenta Hayashi, the K-1 Featherweight champion Taito Gunji was scheduled to make his first title defense against View Petchkoson, while the K-1 Women's Flyweight champion Kana Morimoto made her second title defense against the one-time FEA and WAKO world champion Funda Alkayış.

=== Fight Card ===
K-1 World GP 2023: K'Festa 6
Weight Class				Method	Round	Time	Notes
Super Lightweight 65 kg	(Japan) Tetsuya Yamato (c)	def.	(Japan) Kenta Hayashi	Decision (Unanimous)	3	3:00	For the K-1 Super Lightweight Championship
Lightweight 62.5 kg	(Japan) Yuki Yoza	def.	(Japan) Taio Asahisa (c)	Decision (Unanimous)	3	3:00	For the K-1 Lightweight Championship
Super Welterweight 70 kg	(Japan) Hiromi Wajima (c)	def.	(Thailand) Jomthong Chuwattana	TKO (Corner stoppage)	4	0:25	For the K-1 Super Welterweight Championship
Catchweight 69 kg	(Japan) Masaaki Noiri	def.	(Russia) Dzhabar Askerov	KO (Right straight)	1	2:00	
Super Welterweight 70 kg	(Netherlands) Jordann Pikeur	def.	(Nepal) Abiral Ghimire	KO (Left hook)	3	0:06	
Super Heavyweight +100 kg	(Japan) Kyotaro Fujimoto	def.	(Croatia) Satoshi Ishii	Decision (Unanimous)	3	3:00	
Intermission
Featherweight 57.5 kg	(Japan) Taito Gunji (c)	def.	(Thailand) View Petchkoson	Decision (Majority)	3	3:00	For the K-1 Featherweight Championship
Super bantamweight 55 kg	(Japan) Akihiro Kaneko (c)	def.	(Thailand) Kompetch Sitsarawatsuer	Decision (Majority)	3	3:00	For the K-1 Super Bantamweight Championship
Super Bantamweight 55 kg	(Japan) Masashi Kumura	def.	(Japan) Masahiko Suzuki	Decision (Unanimous)	3	3:00	
Featherweight 57.5 kg	(Japan) Haruto Yasumoto	def.	(Japan) Toma	Decision (Unanimous)	3	3:00	
Welterweight 67.5 kg	(Ghana) Ayinta Ali	def.	(Japan) Takumi Sanekata	Decision (Unanimous)	3	3:00	
Cruiserweight 90 kg	(Romania) Ștefan Lătescu	def.	(Japan) Seiya Tanigawa	KO (Punches)	2	2:50	
Cruiserweight 90 kg	(Japan) Ryunosuke Hoshi	def.	(Philippines) Akira Jr	KO (Right cross)	3	1:08	
Intermission
Women's Flyweight 52 kg	(Japan) KANA (c)	def.	(Turkey) Funda Alkayış	TKO (Retirement/low kicks)	2	1:31	For the K-1 Women's Flyweight Championship
Atomweight 45 kg	(Japan) Miyuu Sugawara	def.	(Thailand) Phayahong Ayothayafightgym (c)	Decision (Majority)	3	3:00	For the K-1 Women's Atomweight Championship
Bantamweight 53 kg	(Thailand) Yodsila Chor.Hapayak	def.	(Japan) Issei Ishii	Decision (Unanimous)	3	3:00	
Super Featherweight 60 kg	(Japan) Yuki Egawa	def.	(South Korea) Kang Yun-Seong	KO (Punches)	1	1:50	
Catchweight 62 kg	(Japan) Tatsuya Oiwa	def.	(Japan) Yuta Kunieda	KO (Right overhand)	2	1:37	
Super Lightweight 65 kg	(Thailand) Pakorn P.K. Saenchai Muaythaigym	def.	(Japan) Hayato Suzuki	Decision (Majority)	3	3:00	
Middleweight 75 kg	(Japan) Shintaro Matsukura	def.	(Brazil) Igor Silva	KO (Right cross)	2	2:25	
Middleweight 75 kg	(Brazil) Vinicius Dionizio	def.	(Japan) Katsuya Jinbo	Decision (Unanimous)	3	3:00	
Preliminary Card
Super Bantamweight 55 kg	(Japan) Eruto	def.	(Japan) Kosuke	KO (Punch)	2	2:58	
Featherweight 57.5 kg	(Japan) Raita Hashimoto	draw	(Japan) Riku Yamamoto	Decision (Split)	3	3:00	
Catchweight 64.5 kg	(Japan) Kuto Ueno	def.	(Japan) Ryugi	Decision (Unanimous)	3	3:00	

== K-1 World GP 2023: inaugural Middleweight Championship Tournament ==
K-1 World GP 2023: inaugural Middleweight Championship Tournament
- Promotion: K-1
- Date: June 3, 2023
- Venue: Yokohama Budokan
- City: Yokohama, Japan

K-1 World GP 2023: inaugural Middleweight Championship Tournament will be a kickboxing event held by K-1 on June 3, 2023, at the Yokohama Budokan in Yokohama, Japan.

=== Background ===
A middleweight (-75 kg) World Grand Prix was held during the event, with the winner being crowned the inaugural K-1 middleweight champion.

K-1 champions Akihiro Kaneko, Yuki Yoza and Toma Kuroda all made appearances in non-title fights.

==== K-1 World Middleweight Tournament bracket ====
Quarter-Finals
(China) Li Hui	DEC
(Japan) Katsuya Jinbo	4R
(Turkey) Hasan Toy	TKO
(Brazil) Danilo Zanolini	1R
(Japan) Shintaro Matsukura	KO
(Brazil) Vinicius Dionizio	1R
(Italy) Mustapha Haida	DEC
(Philippines) MIKE JOE	3R

Semi-Finals
(China) Li Hui	DEC
(Turkey) Hasan Toy	3R
(Japan) Shintaro Matsukura	DEC
(Italy) Mustapha Haida	3R

Final
(Turkey) Hasan Toy	KO
(Japan) Shintaro Matsukura	1R

=== Fight Card ===
K-1 World GP 2023: inaugural Middleweight Championship Tournament
Weight Class				Method	Round	Time	Notes
Middleweight 75 kg	(Turkey) Hasan Toy	def.	(Japan) Shintaro Matsukura	KO (Left hook)	1	0:46	K-1 75 kg World Grand Prix Final. For the inaugural K-1 Middleweight Championship.
Catchweight 56 kg	(Japan) Akihiro Kaneko	def.	(Turkey) Emre Karaca	KO (3 Knockdowns/punches)	1		
Lightweight 62.5 kg	(Japan) Yuki Yoza	def.	(Republic of Ireland) Aaron Clarke	Decision (Unanimous)	3	3:00	
Bantamweight 53 kg	(Japan) Toma Kuroda	def.	(Lebanon) Ramadan Ondash	Decision (Unanimous)	3	3:00	
Bantamweight 53 kg	(Japan) Koji Ikeda	def.	(Thailand) Petchmongkol Soonkelahuaytom	Ext.R Decision (Split)	4	3:00	
Super Featherweight 60 kg	(Japan) Tomoya Yokoyama	def.	(Japan) Tatsuya Oiwa	Decision (Majority)	3	3:00	
Super Featherweight 60 kg	(Japan) Chihiro Nakajima	def.	(South Korea) Han Kyungmin	KO (Left hook to the body)	2	1:06	
Middleweight 75 kg	(Japan) Shintaro Matsukura	def.	(Italy) Mustapha Haida	Decision (Unanimous)	3	3:00	K-1 75 kg World Grand Prix Semi Final
Middleweight 75 kg	(Turkey) Hasan Toy	def.	(China) Li Hui	Decision (Unanimous)	3	3:00	K-1 75 kg World Grand Prix Semi Final
Super Lightweight 65 kg	(Thailand) Pakorn P.K. Saenchai Muaythaigym	def.	(Japan) Daizo Sasaki	Ext.R Decision (Split)	4	3:00	
Featherweight 57.5 kg	(Japan) Tatsuya Tsubakihara	def.	(Japan) Riku Morisaka	Decision (Unanimous)	3	3:00	
Bantamweight 53 kg	(Japan) Kazuki Miburo	def.	(Japan) Yusei Shirahata	Decision (Unanimous)	3	3:00	
Bantamweight 53 kg	(Japan) Ryunosuke Saito	def.	(Japan) Rui Okubo	Ext.R Decision (Split)	4	3:00	
Middleweight 75 kg	(Italy) Mustapha Haida	def.	(Philippines) MIKE JOE	Decision (Majority)	3	3:00	K-1 75 kg World Grand Prix Quarter Final
Middleweight 75 kg	(Japan) Shintaro Matsukura	def.	(Brazil) Vinicius Dionizio	TKO (2 Knockdowns/punches)	1	2:09	K-1 75 kg World Grand Prix Quarter Final
Middleweight 75 kg	(Turkey) Hasan Toy	def.	(Brazil) Danilo Zanolini	TKO (2 Knockdowns/high kick)	1	1:35	K-1 75 kg World Grand Prix Quarter Final
Middleweight 75 kg	(China) Li Hui	def.	(Japan) Katsuya Jinbo	Ext.R Decision (Unanimous)	4	3:00	K-1 75 kg World Grand Prix Quarter Final
Middleweight 75 kg	(Japan) Aqil Bukhari	def.	(Japan) Tomoki Yoshino	KO (Punches)	2	2:11	K-1 75 kg World Grand Prix reserve fight
Preliminary Card
Middleweight 75 kg	(Japan) Masaki Oishi	def.	(Japan) Yashazaru	KO (Front kick to the body)	1	1:17	
Featherweight 57.5 kg	(Japan) Raita Hashimoto	draw.	(Japan) Kokoro Terashima	Decision (Majority)	3	3:00	

== K-1 World GP 2023 at Ryogoku ==
K-1 World GP 2023 at Ryogoku
- Promotion: K-1
- Date: July 17, 2023
- Venue: Ryōgoku Kokugikan
- City: Tokyo, Japan

K-1 World GP 2023 at Ryogoku will be a kickboxing event held by K-1 on July 17, 2023, at the Ryōgoku Kokugikan in Tokyo, Japan.

=== Background ===
A K-1 Super Welterweight Championship bout between champion Hiromi Wajima and former Krush Super Welterweight Champion Jordann Pikeur is expected to headline the event.

A catchweight bout between K-1's former super lightweight and welterweight champion Masaaki Noiri and current SUPERKOMBAT Middleweight Champion Amansio Paraschiv is expected to co-headline the event. Paraschiv took the fight on short notice.

A cruiserweight bout between former Krush and K-1 cruiserweight champion K-Jee and former DFS Heavyweight Championship challenger Ștefan Lătescu is expected to take place at the event.

=== Fight Card ===
K-1 World GP 2023 at Ryogoku
Weight Class				Method	Round	Time	Notes
Super Welterweight 70 kg	(Japan) Hiromi Wajima (c)	def.	(Netherlands) Jordann Pikeur	TKO (Referee stop./punches)	2	2:17	For the K-1 Super Welterweight title
Women's Flyweight 52 kg	(Japan) KANA (C)	def.	(England) Mckenna Wade	KO (Body kick)	1	0:52	For the K-1 Women's Flyweight title
Catchweight 69.5 kg	(Japan) Masaaki Noiri	def.	(Romania) Amansio Paraschiv	KO (Body kick)	1	1:33	
Featherweight 57.5 kg	(Japan) Taito Gunji	def.	(Thailand) Daosayam Wor.Wanchai	Decision (Unanimous)	3	3:00	
Atomweight 45 kg	(Japan) Miyuu Sugawara	def.	(Greece) Dimitra Agathangelidou	Decision (Unanimous)	3	3:00	
Catchweight 63.5 kg	(Japan) Yuki Yoza	def.	(Thailand) Aikmongkol Gaiyanghadao	KO (Liver kick)	1	0:43	
Cruiserweight 90 kg	(Romania) Ștefan Lătescu	def.	(Japan) K-Jee	KO (Left hook to the body)	1	1:53	
Cruiserweight 90 kg	(Japan) Seiya Tanigawa	def.	(Philippines) Akira Jr	Decision (Unanimous)	3	3:00	
Cruiserweight 90 kg	(Brazil) Carlos Budiao	def.	(Japan) Ryunosuke Hoshi	TKO (3 knockdowns)	1	0:58	
Featherweight 57.5 kg	(Japan) Toma	def.	(Thailand) View Petchkoson	TKO (Ref.stop/punches)	3	2:52	
Featherweight 57.5 kg	(Japan) Tatsuki Shinotsuka	def.	(Japan) Yusuke	Ext.R KO (Punches)	4	0:46	
Women's Flyweight 52 kg	(Japan) SAHO	def.	(Japan) Mariya Suzuki	Decision (Unanimous)	3	3:00	
Super Bantamweight 55 kg	(Japan) Chikara Iwao	def.	(Japan) Koki	KO (Body punches)	1	1:45	
Welterweight 67.5 kg	(Thailand) Jomthong Strikergym	def.	(Ghana) Ayinta Ali	Decision (Unanimous)	3	3:00	
Atomweight 45 kg	(Japan) Kira Matsutani	def.	(Thailand) Phayahong Ayothayafightgym	Ext.R Decision (Unanimous)	4	3:00	
Lightweight 62.5 kg	(Japan) Yuto Shinohara	def.	(Japan) Ryuka	Decision (Unanimous)	3	3:00	
Catchweight 59 kg	(Japan) Taimu Hisai	def.	(Japan) Ryuto	Decision (Majority)	3	3:00	
Catchweight 64 kg	(Japan) Fumiya Osawa	def.	(Japan) Hisaki Higashimoto	Decision (Unanimous)	3	3:00	
Lightweight 62.5 kg	(Japan) Kento Ito	def.	(Thailand) Tingtong Seikenkai	Decision (Unanimous)	3	3:00	
Super Lightweight 65 kg	(Japan) Hayato Suzuki	def.	(Thailand) Dansiam AyothayaFightgym	KO (Left cross)	1	1:28	
Super Lightweight 65 kg	(Japan) Fukashi	draw.	(South Korea) Sijun Jin	Decision (Split)	3	3:00	
Preliminary Card
Lightweight 62.5 kg	(Japan) Kuto Ueno	def.	(Japan) Shuichi Inoue	KO (Low kick)	2	2:59	
Featherweight 57.5 kg	(Japan) Haruto Matsumoto	def.	(Japan) Riku Yamamoto	Decision (Unanimous)	3	3:00	

== ReBOOT～K-1 ReBIRTH～ ==
ReBOOT～K-1 ReBIRTH～
- Promotion: K-1
- Date: September 10, 2023
- Venue: Yokohama Arena
- City: Yokohama, Japan

ReBOOT～K-1 ReBIRTH～ was a kickboxing event held by K-1 on September 10, 2023, at the Yokohama Arena in Yokohama, Japan.

Part of the collaborative ReBOOT event with Quintet, K-1 ReBIRTH intended to be the first event in a revamp of K-1; in-which the promotion re-branded their weight classes (under the "K-1 WORLD GP" and "K-1 WORLD MAX" banners, for heavyweights and fighters weighting -75 kg and under, respectively) and held a heavyweight World Grand Prix similar to past K-1 tournaments from the FEG years.

The event was distributed by DAZN outside of Japan.

=== Background ===
A K-1 Super Bantamweight Championship bout between current champion Akihiro Kaneko and challenger Masashi Kumura co-headlined the event.

==== K-1 30th Anniversary Openweight Tournament ====
Quarter-Finals
(Italy) Claudio Istrate	KO
(Iran) Mahmoud Sattari	1R
(Iran) Sina Karimian	TKO
(Germany) Kerim Jemai	3R
(Poland) Michał Turyński	4R
(Brazil) Ariel Machado	UD
(Romania) Valentin Bordianu	1R
(China) Liu Ce	KO

Semi-Finals
(Italy) Claudio Istrate	DEC
(Iran) Sina Karimian	3R
(Brazil) Ariel Machado	2R
(China) Liu Ce	KO

Final
(Italy) Claudio Istrate	1R
(China) Liu Ce	KO

=== Fight Card ===
ReBOOT～K-1 ReBIRTH～
Weight Class				Method	Round	Time	Notes
Openweight	(China) Liu Ce	def.	(Italy) Claudio Istrate	KO (Low kick)	1	0:45	K-1 30th Anniversary Openweight Tournament Final
Super Bantamweight 55 kg	(Japan) Akihiro Kaneko (c)	def.	(Japan) Masashi Kumura	Ext.R Decision (Unanimous)	4	3:00	For the K-1 Super Bantamweight Championship
Super Heavyweight +100 kg	(Japan) Mikio Ueda	def.	(Japan) K-Jee	TKO (3 knockdows)	2	1:39	
Openweight	(China) Liu Ce	def.	(Brazil) Ariel Machado	KO (Low kicks)	2	1:57	K-1 30th Anniversary Openweight Tournament Semi Final
Openweight	(Italy) Claudio Istrate	def.	(Iran) Sina Karimian	Decision (Unanimous)	3	3:00	K-1 30th Anniversary Openweight Tournament Semi Final
Featherweight 57.5 kg	(Japan) Taito Gunji	def.	(Greece) Angelos Martinos	Decision (Majority)	3	3:00	
Super Featherweight 60 kg	(Japan) Tomoya Yokoyama	def.	(Japan) Yuki Egawa	Decision (Unanimous)	3	3:00	
Openweight	(China) Liu Ce	def.	(Romania) Valentin Bordianu	KO (Right hook)	1	1:36	K-1 30th Anniversary Openweight Tournament Quarter Final
Openweight	(Brazil) Ariel Machado	def.	(Poland) Michał Turyński	Ext.R Decision (Unanimous)	4	3:00	K-1 30th Anniversary Openweight Tournament Quarter Final
Openweight	(Iran) Sina Karimian	def.	(Germany) Kerim Jemai	TKO (2 knockdowns/punches)	3	1:35	K-1 30th Anniversary Openweight Tournament Quarter Final
Openweight	(Italy) Claudio Istrate	def.	(Iran) Mahmoud Sattari	TKO (2 knockdowns/punches)	1	2:19	K-1 30th Anniversary Openweight Tournament Quarter Final
Preliminary Card
Atomweight 45 kg	(Japan) Miyuu Sugawara	def.	(Greece) Maria Nella	Decision (Unanimous)	3	3:00	
Lightweight 62.5 kg	(Japan) Kento Ito	def.	(Japan) Yuzuki Satomi	TKO (Referee stop./punches)	2	2:18	
Bantamweight 53 kg	(Japan) Koji Ikeda	def.	(Japan) Shinta	KO (knee to the body)	2	2:43	
Super Lightweight 65 kg	(Japan) Hayato Suzuki	def.	(Morocco) Mohamed Islam	Ext. R Decision (Split)	4	3:00	

== K-1 ReBIRTH 2 ==
K-1 ReBIRTH 2
- Promotion: K-1
- Date: December 9, 2023
- Venue: Edion Arena
- City: Osaka, Japan

K-1 ReBIRTH 2 was a kickboxing event to be held by K-1 on December 9, 2023, at the Edion Arena in Osaka, Japan.

=== Background ===
A trio of title fights was announced for the event on October 10: a K-1 Bantamweight Championship bout between Issei Ishii and Toma Kuroda, a K-1 Middleweight Championship bout between Hasan Toy and Shintaro Matsukura, a K-1 Super Welterweight Championship bout between Hiromi Wajima and Ouyang Feng.

=== Fight Card ===
K-1 ReBIRTH 2
Weight Class				Method	Round	Time	Notes
Lightweight 70 kg	(China) Ouyang Feng	def.	(Japan) Hiromi Wajima (c)	KO (Right cross)	2	2:13	For the K-1 Super Welterweight Championship
Middleweight 75 kg	(Japan) Shintaro Matsukura	def.	(Turkey) Hasan Toy (c)	Ext.R Decision (Split)	4	3:00	For the K-1 Middleweight Championship
Super Featherweight 60 kg	(France) Rémi Parra	def.	(Japan) Leona Pettas	Decision (Majority)	3	3:00	
Catchweight 56 kg	(Japan) Akihiro Kaneko	def.	(China) Lan Shanteng	Decision (Unanimous)	3	3:00	
Cruiserweight 90 kg	(China) Liu Ce	def.	(Japan) Seiya Tanigawa	KO (Right cross)	1	2:38	
Featherweight 57.5 kg	(Japan) Kyo Kawakami	def.	(Japan) Toma	Decision (Unanimous)	3	3:00	
Welterweight 67.5 kg	(Canada) Meison Hide Usami	def.	(Japan) Kaito	KO (Punches)	2	1:05	
Catchweight 66 kg	(Japan) Hayato Suzuki	def.	(Japan) Toyoki	TKO (Middle kick)	3	0:44	
Intermission
Bantamweight 53 kg	(Japan) Toma Kuroda (c)	def.	(Japan) Issei Ishii	Decision (Unanimous)	3	3:00	For the K-1 Bantamweight Championship
Women's Flyweight 52 kg	(Greece) Antonia Prifti	def.	(Japan) KANA (c)	Decision (Unanimous)	3	3:00	For the K-1 Women's Flyweight Championship
Women's Flyweight 52 kg	(Japan) SAHO	def.	(China) Li Lishan	Decision (Unanimous)	3	3:00	
Atomweight 45 kg	(Japan) Miyuu Sugawara	def.	(Australia) Lucille Deadman	Decision (Unanimous)	3	3:00	
Cruiserweight 90 kg	(Japan) Shota Yamaguchi	def.	(Japan) Ryunosuke Hoshi	TKO (Punches)	3	1:00	
Welterweight 67.5 kg	(Japan) Riki Matsuoka	def.	(Thailand) Jomthong Strikergym	Decision (Unanimous)	3	3:00	
Lightweight 62.5 kg	(Japan) Tatsuya Oiwa	def.	(Japan) Yuto Shinohara	KO (Right cross)	1	2:38	
Featherweight 57.5 kg	(Japan) Shoki Kaneda	def.	(Thailand) Dausayam Wor.Wanchai	TKO (Punches)	1	2:17	
Featherweight 57.5 kg	(Japan) Tatsuya Tsubakihara	def.	(Japan) Kensuke	Decision (Unanimous)	3	3:00	
Super Welterweight 70 kg	(Japan) Riku	def.	(Nepal) Abiral Ghimire	Decision (Unanimous)	3	3:00	
Preliminary Card
Catchweight 51 kg	(Japan) Tsubasa Yamawaki	def.	(Japan) Toya Matsuba	Decision (Unanimous)	3	3:00	
Super Bantamweight 55 kg	(Japan) Kengo Murata	def.	(Japan) Kaito Horii	Decision (Unanimous)	3	3:00	
Featherweight 57.5 kg	(Japan) Haruto Matsumoto	def.	(Japan) Kaishi	TKO (Punches)	1	2:48	
Super Featherweight 60 kg	(Japan) Sota Amano	def.	(Japan) Toki Harada	TKO (Left hook)	2	0:47	
Catchweight 51 kg	(Japan) Gentaro	def.	(Japan) Takumi Yoshimura	Decision (Unanimous)	3	3:00	

== See also ==
- 2023 in Glory
- 2023 in ONE Championship
- 2023 in Romanian kickboxing
- 2023 in Wu Lin Feng
