= Danilo Zanolini =

Brazilian male kickboxer

Daniro Zanolini
- Born: July 29, 1980 (age 46); Curitiba, Brazil
- Other names: ダニロ・ザノリニ
- Height: 1.74 m (5 ft 8 1/2 in)
- Weight: 75 kg (165 lb; 11.8 st)
- Division: Lightweight; Welterweight
- Style: Kickboxing
- Stance: Orthodox
- Fighting out of: Nagoya, Japan
- Team: Shimura Dojo

Kickboxing record
- Total: 57
- Wins: 43
- By knockout: 20
- Losses: 14
- By knockout: 4

Danilo Zanolini (29 July 1980) is a Brazilian kickboxer, competing in the welterweight divisions of RISE and Rizin FF. He is the former RISE Welterweight, HEAT Middleweight and ISKA Super Welterweight World K-1 champion.

== Kickboxing career ==
=== Early career ===
Zanolini fought Fapicart RS Promotion for the vacant HEAT Kick Middleweight title at HEAT 13 on March 14, 2010, and successfully won the title by a second-round knockout. He defended his title a grand total of four times, before being scheduled to fight for the inaugural RISE welterweight belt.

=== HEAT and RISE champion ===
==== Title reign ====
Zanolini was scheduled to face Taiki Watanabe for the inaugural RISE Welterweight title at RISE 96 on November 4, 2013. He won the closely contested affair by majority decision, with two of the three judges awarding him a 48-47 scorecard.

Zanolini made his fifth HEAT Kick middleweight title defense against Ok Dong-ju at HEAT 31 on April 19, 2014. He won the fight by a second-round technical knockout.

Zanolini made his first RISE Welterweight title defense against Yuichiro Nagashima at RISE 100～BLADE 0～ on July 12, 2014. Zanolini won the fight by disqualification, as an illegal move broke his ribs and left him unable to continue fighting.

Zanolini was scheduled to face Maki Hinrekkufai at HEAT 33 on September 7, 2014. He won the fight by an extra round decision. Zanolini was afterwards scheduled to face Chuchai Hadesworkoutgym at HOOST CUP KINGSWEST ~ Jin of Naniwa ~ on November 16, 2014. He won the fight by unanimous decision. Zanolini's ten fight winning streak was stopped by Kenta Yamada at HOOST CUP FOREVER ~ Kick, forever! ~ on December 27, 2014, who beat him by split decision, after an extra round was fought.

Zanolini made his sixth HEAT Kick middleweight title defense against Baek Man-sung at HEAT 35 on March 22, 2015. He won the fight by a second-round technical knockout.

Zanolini rematched Kenta Yamada at RISE 106 on July 24, 2015, in a RISE Welterweight title defense. He won the fight by unanimous decision, with scores of 50-47, 50-47 and 50-45.

Zanolini challenged Philippe Salmon for the ISKA World Super Welterweight K-1 title at HEAT 36 on November 29, 2015. He won the fight by a first-round knockout, stopping Salmon with a right straight at the 2:42 minute mark.

==== Later career ====
Zanolini made his promotional debut with Rizin at their inaugural event on April 17, 2016, against Norihisa Amimoto. He won the fight by technical knockout, having knocked Amimoto down thrice in the first round.

Zanolini was scheduled to face Gu Hui at Kunlun Fight 49 / Rebels 45 on August 7, 2016. He won the fight by unanimous decision.

Zanolini was scheduled to fight Chuchai Hadesworkoutgym in the quarterfinals of the HOOST CUP 70 kg tournament, held at HOOST CUP KINGS OSAKA on October 2, 2016. He lost the closely contested bout by majority decision, with scores of 30-29, 29-29 and 30-29.

Zanolini participated in the 2017 Kunlun Fight welterweight qualification tournament, which was held at Kunlun Fight 57 on February 26, 2017. Although he was able to beat Hua Xu by majority decision in the semifinals, he lost to Mohamed Mezouari in the finals. Mezouari needed just 21 seconds to knock him out with a body kick.

Zanolini was scheduled to face Lee Jang Gyu at STAND FIGHTING NETWORK K-ING and HOOST CUP NAGOYA on May 28, 2017. He won the fight by a first-round knockout, flooring his opponent with a right hook. The knockout was preceded by a knockdown, which Zanolini scored with a left hook.

He was scheduled to make his eight and final title defense against Li Ji Hoon at HEAT 40 on July 15, 2017. He won the fight by unanimous decision, with scores of 50-43, 50-47 and 50-48. He announced his retirement from the sport in the post-fight interview.

=== Return from retirement ===
It was revealed on July 5, 2018, that Zanolini would come out of retirement to face Go Woo Yong at HEAT 43 on September 17, 2018. A month prior, on June 18, a fire broke out in Zanolini's Brazil-based gym, which almost completely destroyed it. This event forced him to return to competition, in order to repay the rebuilding of his gym, as he was uninsured. Zanolini won the fight by a second-round knockout.

Zanolini was scheduled to face John Wayne Parr at RIZIN 18 on August 18, 2019. He won the fight by split decision.

Zanolini was scheduled to face Katsuya Jinbo at K-1 World GP 2022 Japan on February 27, 2022. He lost the fight by unanimous decision.

Zanolini faced the former KROSS×OVER cruiserweight champion Park Yohan in a 75 kg bout at K-1 World GP 2022 Yokohamatsuri on September 11, 2022. He won the fight by majority decision.

Zanolini faced Hasan Toy in the quarterfinals of the first-ever K-1 Middleweight Grand Prix, held to crown the inaugural middleweight champion, on June 3, 2023. He lost the fight by a first-round technical knockout, after twice being knocked down by the midway point of the opening round.

== Championships and accomplishments ==
- HEAT
  - HEAT Kick Middleweight Championship
    - Eight successful title defenses
- RISE
  - RISE Welterweight World Championship
    - Two successful title defenses
- ISKA
  - ISKA World Super Welterweight K-1 Championship
- HOOST CUP
  - HOOST CUP Japan Middleweight Championship

== Kickboxing record ==
Professional Kickboxing Record
43 Wins (20 (T)KO's), 14 Losses, 0 Draw, 0 No Contest
| Date | Result | Opponent | Event | Location | Method | Round | Time |
| 2023-06-03 | Loss | (Turkey) Hasan Toy | K-1 World GP 2023: inaugural Middleweight Championship Tournament, Quarter Final | Yokohama, Japan | TKO (2 Knockdowns/high kick) | 1 | 1:35 |
| 2022-09-11 | Win | (South Korea) Park Yohan | K-1 World GP 2022 Yokohamatsuri | Tokyo, Japan | Decision (Majority) | 3 | 3:00 |
| 2022-02-27 | Loss | (Japan) Katsuya Jinbo | K-1 World GP 2022 Japan | Tokyo, Japan | Decision (Unanimous) | 3 | 3:00 |
| 2019-08-18 | Win | (Australia) John Wayne Parr | RIZIN 18 | Nagoya, Japan | Decision (split) | 3 | 3:00 |
| 2018-09-17 | Win | (South Korea) Go Woo Yong | HEAT 43 | Nagoya, Japan | KO | 2 | 2:43 |
| 2017-07-15 | Win | (South Korea) Li Ji Hoon | HEAT 40 | Nagoya, Japan | Decision (Unanimous) | 5 | 3:00 |
Defends the HEAT Kick Middleweight title.
| 2017-05-28 | Win | (South Korea) Lee Jang Gyu | STAND FIGHTING NETWORK K-ING and HOOST CUP NAGOYA | Nagoya, Japan | KO (Right hook) | 1 | 2:06 |
| 2017-02-26 | Loss | (Morocco) Mohamed Mezouari | Kunlun Fight 57 - World MAX 2017 Group 1 Tournament Final, Tournament Semifinals | Sanya, China | KO (Left body kick) | 1 | 0:21 |
| 2017-02-26 | Win | (China) Hua Xu | Kunlun Fight 57 - World MAX 2017 Group 1 Tournament Final, Tournament Semifinals | Sanya, China | Decision (Majority) | 3 | 3:00 |
| 2016-11-20 | Win | (Thailand) Chuchai Hadesworkoutgym | HOOST CUP KINGS NAGOYA 2 | Nagoya, Japan | Decision (Unanimous) | 3 | 3:00 |
Wins the HOOST CUP Japan Middleweight title.
| 2016-10-02 | Loss | (Thailand) Chuchai Hadesworkoutgym | HOOST CUP KINGS OSAKA, Tournament Quarterfinals | Osaka, Japan | Decision (Majority) | 3 | 3:00 |
| 2016-08-07 | Win | (China) Gu Hui | Kunlun Fight 49 / Rebels 45 | Tokyo, Japan | Decision (Unanimous) | 3 | 3:00 |
| 2016-04-17 | Win | (Japan) Norihisa Amimoto | Rizin 1 | Nagoya, Japan | TKO (3 Knockdowns) | 1 | 2:19 |
| 2015-11-29 | Win | (France) Philippe Salmon | HEAT 36 | Nagoya, Japan | KO (Right straight) | 1 | 2:42 |
Wins the ISKA World Super Welterweight K-1 title.
| 2015-07-24 | Win | (Japan) Kenta | RISE 106 | Tokyo, Japan | Decision (Unanimous) | 5 | 3:00 |
Defends the RISE Welterweight title.
| 2015-03-22 | Win | (South Korea) Baek Man-sung | HEAT 35 | Nagoya, Japan | TKO (Punches) | 2 | 3:10 |
Defends the HEAT Kick Middleweight title.
| 2014-12-27 | Loss | (Japan) Kenta | HOOST CUP FOREVER ~ Kick, forever! ~ | Nagoya, Japan | Ext. R. Decision (Split) | 4 | 3:00 |
| 2014-11-16 | Win | (Thailand) Chuchai Hadesworkoutgym | HOOST CUP KINGSWEST ~ Jin of Naniwa ~ | Osaka, Japan | Decision (Unanimous) | 3 | 3:00 |
| 2014-09-07 | Win | (Thailand) Hinlekfai Maki | HEAT 33 | Nagoya, Japan | Ext. R. Decision (Unanimous) | 4 | 3:00 |
| 2014-07-12 | Win | (Japan) Yuichiro Nagashima | RISE 100～BLADE 0～ | Tokyo, Japan | DQ (Illegal dump) | 2 | |
Defends the RISE Welterweight title.
| 2014-04-19 | Win | (South Korea) Ok Dong-ju | HEAT 31 | Nagoya, Japan | TKO (Three knockdowns) | 2 | 2:25 |
Defends the HEAT Kick Middleweight title.
| 2013-11-04 | Win | (Japan) Taiki Watanabe | RISE 96 | Tokyo, Japan | Decision (Majority) | 5 | 3:00 |
Wins the inaugural RISE Welterweight title.
| 2013-09-13 | Win | (Japan) Kenji Kanai | RISE 95 | Tokyo, Japan | Decision (Unanimous) | 3 | 3:00 |
| 2013-07-28 | Win | (Japan) Yuji Nashiro | HEAT 27 | Kobe, Japan | Decision (Unanimous) | 5 | 3:00 |
Defends the HEAT Kick Middleweight title.
| 2013-05-03 | Loss | (Japan) Yu Hirono | Road to GLORY JAPAN | Tokyo, Japan | Decision (Majority) | 3 | 3:00 |
| 2013-03-31 | Win | (Korea) Jun Kwan Sik | HEAT 26 | Nagoya, Japan | Decision (Unanimous) | 3 | 3:00 |
| 2012-10-07 | Win | (Japan) Ren Takeno | HEAT 24 | Nagoya, Japan | Decision (Unanimous) | 5 | 3:00 |
Defends the HEAT Kick Middleweight title.
| 2012-05-20 | Win | (Japan) Soichiro Miyakoshi | HOOST CUP ~ Departure ~ | Nagoya, Japan | Decision (Majority) | 3 | 3:00 |
| 2012-01-22 | Loss | (Japan) Hiroki Nakajima | REBELS.10 | Tokyo, Japan | Decision (Unanimous) | 5 | 3:00 |
For the It's Showtime Japan Welterweight title.
| 2011-12-17 | Win | (South Korea) Lee Su-hwan | HEAT 20th Anniversary Tournament | Tokyo, Japan | TKO (Three knockdowns) | 2 | 2:37 |
Defends the HEAT Kick Middleweight title.
| 2011-04-17 | Loss | (Japan) Hinata | SNKA TITANS NEOS IX | Tokyo, Japan | Decision (Unanimous) | 3 | 3:00 |
| 2011-03-13 | Win | (Japan) Kazuki Hamasaki | HEAT 17 | Nagoya, Japan | Decision (Majority) | 3 | 3:00 |
Defends the HEAT Kick Middleweight title.
| 2010-12-19 | Loss | (Japan) Yukihiro Komiya | RISE 73R | Tokyo, Japan | Ext. R. Decision (Unanimous) | 4 | 3:00 |
| 2010-09-20 | Win | (Japan) Hosoe Toshihiro | HEAT 15 | Kizugawa, Kyoto, Japan | TKO | 3 | 1:56 |
| 2010-09-11 | Win | (United States) Kaleo Kwan | X-1 World Events 36: Heroes | Honolulu, Hawaii | Decision (Unanimous) | 3 | 3:00 |
| 2010-05-27 | Win | (Japan) Daisuke Tsutsumi | Krush.7 | Tokyo, Japan | TKO | 3 | 0:56 |
| 2010-03-27 | Loss | (Japan) Yoshihiro Sato | K-1 WORLD MAX 2010 ~ -70 kg Japan Tournament ~ | Tokyo, Japan | TKO (Right knee) | 2 | 3:11 |
| 2010-03-14 | Win | (Thailand) Fapicart RS Promotion | HEAT 13 | Nagoya, Japan | KO | 2 | 1:17 |
Wins the vacant HEAT Kick Middleweight title.
| 2009-11-01 | Win | (South Korea) Oh Dusek | HEAT 12 | Nagoya, Japan | Ext. R. Decision (Unanimous) | 4 | 3:00 |
| 2009-09-26 | Win | (Japan) Shingo Garyu | HEAT 11 | Nagoya, Japan | Decision (Unanimous) | 3 | 3:00 |
| 2009-07-18 | Win | (Japan) Kinshi | HEAT 10 | Nagoya, Japan | Decision (Unanimous) | 3 | 3:00 |
| 2009-03-28 | Win | (Japan) Hideto Yamada | HEAT 9 | Nagoya, Japan | KO | 2 | 1:45 |
| 2008-12-07 | Win | (Japan) Yuto Watanabe | TRIAL LEAGUE | Tokyo, Japan | KO | 2 | 1:45 |
| 2008-03-30 | Loss | (Thailand) Fapicart RS Promotion | HEAT 6, Tournament Quarterfinals | Nagoya, Japan | TKO | 3 | 3:00 |
| 2007-11-25 | Win | (Japan) Shunsuke Oishi | HEAT 5-MEGA BATTLE HEAT FROM NAGOYA | Nagoya, Japan | Decision (Majority) | 3 | 3:00 |
| 2007-08-11 | Loss | (Netherlands) Little Mo | HEAT 4-MEGA BATTLE HEAT from NAGOYA | Nagoya, Japan | Decision (Unanimous) | 3 | 3:00 |
Legend: Win Loss Draw/No contest Notes

== Mixed martial arts record ==
Professional record breakdown
| 1 match | 0 wins | 1 loss |
| By knockout | 0 | 0 |
| By submission | 0 | 1 |
| By decision | 0 | 0 |

| Res. | Record | Opponent | Method | Event | Date | Round | Time | Location | Notes |
|---|---|---|---|---|---|---|---|---|---|
| Loss | 0-1 | (Japan) Eiji Mitsuoka | Submission (Armbar) | CAGE FORCE 01 | 25 November 2006 | 1 | 1:23 | Tokyo, Japan | |

== See also ==
- List of male kickboxers
