= Hasan Toy =

Dutch-Turkish kickboxer (born 1994)

- Born: April 18, 1994 (age 32); Kayseri, Turkey
- Nationality: Dutch & Turkish
- Height: 184 cm (6 ft 0 in)
- Weight: 67 kg (148 lb; 10.6 st)
- Style: Kickboxing
- Fighting out of: The Hague, Netherlands
- Team: Team Toy; ARJ Trainingen (former); Mike's Gym (former)
- Trainer: Maikel Polanen: manager
- Years active: 2013 - present

Kickboxing record
- Total: 45
- Wins: 29
- By knockout: 11
- Losses: 15
- By knockout: 0
- Draws: 1

Hasan Toy (born April 18, 1994) is a Dutch-Turkish kickboxer, currently competing in the middleweight division of K-1. He is the former K-1 Middleweight Champion and the 2023 K-1 World Middleweight Grand Prix winner.

== Kickboxing career ==
=== Wu Lin Feng ===
Toy participated in the 2018 Wu Lin Feng 67 kilogram contender tournament, held at Wu Lin Feng 2018: World Championship Tianjin on March 3, 2018. After beating Feng Jie by unanimous decision in the semifinals, Toy faced Ilias Bulaid in the tournament finals. He won the fight by split decision.

Toy faced David Mejia at Wu Lin Feng 2018: WLF -67kg World Cup 2018-2019 2nd Round on August 4, 2018. He won the fight by decision. Toy was booked to face Liu Yaning at Wu Lin Feng 2018: WLF -67kg World Cup 2018-2019 4th Round on October 6, 2018. He won the fight by a second-round technical knockout. Toy next faced Diego Freitas at Wu Lin Feng 2018: WLF -67kg World Cup 2018-2019 6th Round on December 1, 2018. He won the fight by decision.

Toy faced Jomthong Chuwattana at Wu Lin Feng 2019: WLF World Cup 2018-2019 Final, in the semifinals of the 2019 WLF 67 kg World Cup. He lost the fight by unanimous decision.

=== K-1 ===
Toy faced Masaaki Noiri at K-1 World GP 2019 Japan: ～Women's Flyweight Championship Tournament～ on December 28, 2019. He lost the fight by majority decision.

Toy returned from a four-year long layoff to take part in the 2023 K-1 World Middleweight Grand Prix, held on June 3, 2023. Toy faced the former RISE Welterweight World champion Danilo Zanolini in the tournament quarterfinals and was able to stop the Brazilian fighter midway through the first round, after he twice knocked him down. Toy advanced to the semifinals of the one-day tournament, where he faced Li Hui. He won the fight by unanimous decision, with scores of 30–28, 30–29 and 30–27. Toy captured the inaugural championship and the tournament title with a first-round knockout of Shintaro Matsukura in the Grand Prix finals.

Toy made his first K-1 Middleweight (-75kg) title defense against Shintaro Matsukura at K-1 ReBIRTH 2 on December 9, 2023. He lost the fight by split decision, after an extra round was contested.

== Titles and accomplishments ==
- World Fighting League
  - 2015 World Fighting League -67 kg Tournament Champion
- World Full Contact Association
  - 2016 WFCA -68 kg European Champion
- Wu Lin Feng
  - 2017 Wu Lin Feng -67 kg 4-man Tournament Champion
- K-1
  - 2023 K-1 World Middleweight Grand Prix Winner
  - 2023 K-1 Middleweight Championship

== Kickboxing record ==
Professional Kickboxing Record
29 Wins (11 (T)KO's), 15 Losses, 1 Draw, 0 No Contests
Date	Result	Opponent	Event	Location	Method	Round	Time
2024-10-05	Loss	(Iran) Iraj Moradi	MEGA FIGHT ARENA 2	Istanbul, Turkey	Decision	3	3:00
2023-12-09	Loss	(Japan) Shintaro Matsukura	K-1 ReBIRTH 2	Osaka, Japan	Ext.R Decision (Split)	4	3:00
Loses the K-1 Middleweight (-75kg) title.
2023-06-03	Win	(Japan) Shintaro Matsukura	K-1 World GP 2023: inaugural Middleweight Championship Tournament, Final	Yokohama, Japan	KO (Left hook)	1	0:42
Wins the inaugural K-1 Middleweight (-75kg) title.
2023-06-03	Win	(China) Li Hui	K-1 World GP 2023: inaugural Middleweight Championship Tournament, Semi Final	Yokohama, Japan	Decision (Unanimous)	3	3:00
2023-06-03	Win	(Brazil) Danilo Zanolini	K-1 World GP 2023: inaugural Middleweight Championship Tournament, Quarter Final	Yokohama, Japan	TKO (2 Knockdowns/high kick)	1	1:35
2019-12-28	Loss	(Japan) Masaaki Noiri	K-1 World GP 2019 Japan: ～Women's Flyweight Championship Tournament～	Nagoya, Japan	Decision (Majority)	3	3:00
2019-01-19	Loss	(Thailand) Jomthong Chuwattana	Wu Lin Feng 2019: WLF World Cup 2018-2019 Final, Semi Final	Haikou, China	Decision (Unanimous)	3	3:00
2018-12-01	Win	(Portugal) Diego Freitas	Wu Lin Feng 2018: WLF -67kg World Cup 2018-2019 6th Round	Zhengzhou, China	Decision	3	3:00
2018-10-06	Win	(China) Liu Yaning	Wu Lin Feng 2018: WLF -67kg World Cup 2018-2019 4th Round	Shangqiu, China	TKO	2	2:45
2018-08-04	Win	(Spain) David Mejia	Wu Lin Feng 2018: WLF -67kg World Cup 2018-2019 2nd Round	Zhengzhou, China	Decision	3	3:00
2018-03-03	Win	(Morocco) Ilias Bulaid	Wu Lin Feng 2018: World Championship Tianjin -67 kg Contender Tournament Final	Tianjin, China	Decision (Split)	3	3:00
2018-03-03	Win	(China) Feng Jie	Wu Lin Feng 2018: World Championship Tianjin -67 kg Contender Tournament Semi Final	Tianjin, China	Decision (Unanimous)	3	3:00
2018-01-27	Loss	(Russia) Arbi Emiev	Mix Fight 24	Buca, Turkey	Ext. R Decision (Split)	4	3:00
2017-12-14	Win	(Czech Republic) Martin Gaňo	Noc Válečníků 13	Kladno, Czech Republic	KO (Left knee to the Body)	3	
2017-12-02	Win	(France) Vang Moua	Mix Fight Gala 23	Frankfurt, Germany	Decision	3	3:00
2017-11-04	Win	(China) Zhong Weipeng	Wu Lin Feng 2017: Yi Long VS Sitthichai	Kunming, China	TKO	3	
2017-07-01	Loss	(Thailand) Sitthichai Sitsongpeenong	Wu Lin Feng - Yi Long challenge Tournament 1/4 finals 4	Zhengzhou, China	Decision (Unanimous)	3	3:00
2017-05-27	Draw	(Albania) Edi Shehaj	Brothers Gym present : THE STORY	Germany	Decision	3	3:00
2017-04-01	Win	(China) Zhong Weipeng	Wu Lin Feng 2017: China VS Europe	Zhengzhou, China	Decision	3	3:00
2017-01-14	Win	(China) Song Shaoqiu	Wu Lin Feng China vs Spain 70 kg Tournament Reserve Fight	Zhengzhou, China	Decision (Unanimous)	3	3:00
2016-11-18	Loss	(Thailand) Jo Nattawut	Lion Fight 33	Mashantucket, Connecticut, US	Decision	5	3:00
For the Lion Fight Super Welterweight title.
2016-10-16	Loss	(Morocco) Walid Hamid	ACB KB 8: Only The Braves	Hoofddorp, Netherlands	Decision (Unanimous)	3	3:00
2016-09-03	Win	(China) Yang Yulong	Wu Lin Feng 2016: Netherlands VS China	Shenzhen, China	TKO (Front Kick)	1	
2016-06-04	Loss	(Morocco) Marouan Toutouh	King of The Ring	Netherlands	Decision	3	3:00
2016-04-23	Loss	(Greece) Florian Markou	No Limits Star Wars	Greece	Decision	3	3:00
2016-04-02	Win	(Suriname) Brown Pinas	Enfusion Live Gold Edition	The Hague, Netherlands	Decision	3	3:00
2016-03-05	Win	(Netherlands) Jan Julius Humme	The Battle Amsterdam vs Rotterdam	Netherlands	Decision (Unanimous)	3	3:00
2016-01-24	Win	(Netherlands) Mac Rakkong	No Guts No Glory 9	Hellevoetsluis, Netherlands	Decision	3	3:00
Wins WFCA -68kg European title.
2015-12-05	Win	(China) Liu Xiangming	Wu Lin Feng	Zhengzhou, China	TKO (Leg Injury)	2	
2015-09-26	Win	(Bosnia and Herzegovina) Albin Fajkovic	World Fighting League	Bosnia and Herzegovina	TKO (Doctor Stoppage/Cut)	1	2:00
2015-07-04	Loss	(China) Lu Jianbo	Wu Lin Feng	China	Decision	3	3:00
2015-05-30	Win	(Russia) Arthur Jaskul	Enfusion Rookies	Netherlands	Decision	3	3:00
2015-04-12	Win	(Netherlands) Buray Bozaryilmaz	World Fighting League, Final	Hoofddorp, Netherlands	TKO (Doctor Stoppage)		
Wins WFL -67kg title. Originally a No Contest
2015-04-12	Win	(Netherlands) Juan Javier Barragan	World Fighting League, Semi Final	Hoofddorp, Netherlands	Decision	3	3:00
2014-11-29	Loss	(Netherlands) Jan Julius	Enfusion Rookies	Netherlands	Ext.R Decision	4	3:00
2014-06-07	Win	(Netherlands) Marcel Verhaar	Fight Sense x Enfusion Rookies	Netherlands	KO (Knee to the head)		
2014-03-02	Loss	(Netherlands) Edson Fortes	The Heat is On	Rotterdam, Netherlands	Decision	3	3:00
2013-11-02	Loss	(Netherlands) Ismael Benali	Bari Gym Event	Noordwijkerhout, Netherlands	Decision	5	3:00
2013-10-10	Win	(Armenia) Tigran Movsisyan	Fight Fans VI	Netherlands	Decision	3	3:00
2013-09-22	Loss	(Morocco) Aziz Kallah	Students of the Game	Haarlem, Netherlands	Decision	5	3:00
Legend: Win Loss Draw/No contest Notes

== See also ==
- List of male kickboxers
