= Rémi Parra =

French kickboxer

- Born: 24 February 2001 (age 25); Ponteilla, France
- Height: 1.75 m (5 ft 9 in)
- Weight: 61 kg (134 lb; 9.6 st)
- Style: Kickboxing, Muay Thai
- Stance: Southpaw
- Fighting out of: Perpignan, France
- Team: Carcharias; Napoli Gym
- Trainer: Christophe Errera

Kickboxing record
- Total: 33
- Wins: 30
- By knockout: 17
- Losses: 3

Rémi Parra (born February 24, 2001) is a French kickboxer. He is the current WAKO-Pro K-1 World Super Lightweight Champion, ISKA Oriental rules Super-lightweight Champion and a former K-1 Super Featherweight Champion.

As of December 2025, he is the #1 ranked -61 kg kickboxer in the world by Beyond Kick.

== Professional kickboxing career ==
Parra made his professional debut on October 13, 2019, against Nicolas Herry. He won the fight by decision.

Parra travelled to Windsor, England to face Josh Thomas at Show Rebellion on October 23, 2021. He won the fight by technical knockout in the third round.

Parra took part in a four-man tournament at EMP Fight Night. In the semifinal he faced Djany Fiorenti who defeated him by decision.

On January 29, 2022, Parra faced Ricardo Cristiani for the vacant IKBO Muay Thai -62 kg world title at Thai Boxe Mania 2022 in Turin, Italy. He won the fight by technical knockout in the third round with leg kicks.

On March 20, 2022, Parra faced Hicham Moujtahid at Fight For Honor VIII in Belgium. He won the fight by decision.

Parra faced Luc Genieys at Le Choc des Gladiateurs 20 on July 23, 2022. He won the fight by second-round technical knockout via low kicks.

On October 23, 2022, Parra faced Alban Bakija at Fight and Dance Championship in Brussels, Belgium. He won the fight by decision.

On December 3, 2022, Parra rematched Hicham Moujtahid for the vacant WAKO Pro K-1 world super lightweight title at TKR in Bezons, France. He won the fight by technical knockout at the end of the fourth round when Moujtahid didn't come out of his corner due to leg kicks. Parra successfully defended his WAKO Pro K-1 world title on May 13, 2023, when he rematched Djany Fiorenti and defeated him by unanimous decision at Le Choc des Etoiles 7.

Parra faced Ernesto De La Colina at Gladiator's Boxing Series on August 12, 2023. He won the fight by a third-round technical knockout.

Parra faced the K-1 Super Featherweight champion Leona Pettas in a non-title bout at K-1 ReBIRTH 2 on December 9, 2023. He won the fight by majority decision: 30–29, 30–29 and 29–29.

Parra made his second WAKO-Pro K-1 World Super Lightweight (-62.2 kg) title defense against Bryan Lang at Emperor Chok Dee 2024 on January 27, 2024. He won the fight by split decision.

Parra was expected to rematch Leona Pettas at K-1 World MAX 2024 - World Tournament Opening Round on March 20, 2024. Pettas withdrew for undisclosed reasons on February 29 and was replaced by Hirotaka Asahisa. Parra lost the fight by unanimous decision.

On November 16, 2024, Parra took part in a 4-man tournament at La Nuit des Champions 31 for the vacant 64.5 kg kg title. In the semifinals he defeated Lorenzo Sammartino by decision and reached the final where he defeated Aitor Ibáñez, also by decision.

Parra faced fellow southpaw Yuta Matsuyama in the quarterfinals of the 6th K-1 Super Featherweight Grand Prix at K-1 Beyond on May 31, 2025. He floored Matsuyama with a left hook at the 1:45 minute mark of the bout, which left his opponent unable to rise from the canvas. Parra faced the former Krush Super Featherweight champion Chihiro Nakajima in the Grand Prix semifinals. He won the fight by a second-round technical knockout. Parra advanced to the finals of the one-day tournament where he faced the former Krush Super Featherweight (-60kg) champion Tomoya Yokoyama. He won the fight by a second-round technical knockout.

== Titles and achievements ==
- World Association of Kickboxing Organizations
  - 2022 WAKO-Pro K-1 World Super Lightweight (-62.2 kg) Champion
    - Two successful defenses
  - 2024 interim WAKO-Pro Low Kick World Light Welterweight (-64.5 kg) Champion
- La Nuit des Champions
  - 2024 La Nuit des Champions -64.5 kg Tournament Winner
  - 2025 La Nuit des Champions -60 kg Champion
- La Nuit des Titans
  - 2025 La Nuit des Titans K-1 -65 kg Champion
- International Sport Kickboxing Association
  - 2025 ISKA Oriental rules Super-lightweight (63.5 kg) Champion
- K-1
  - 2025 K-1 Super Featherweight Championship Tournament Winner
  - 2025 K-1 Super Featherweight (-60kg) Champion

Awards

- 2025 Combat Press Fighter of the Year

== Kickboxing record ==
Professional Muay Thai and Kickboxing record
30 Wins (17 (T)KO's), 3 Losses, 0 Draw
Date	Result	Opponent	Event	Location	Method	Round	Time
2026-12-12		(Republic of Ireland) Aaron Clarke	Byon 9 – 61 kg World Grand Prix, Quarterfinals	Jakarta, Indonesia			
2026-11-28		(Japan) Rei Nakajima	La Nuit des Champions 33	Marseille, France			
Defending La Nuit des Champions -64.5 kg title.
2026-07-04	Win	(Morocco) Zakaria El Jari	Petit Prince Trophy 5	Marguerittes, France	Decision (Unanimous)	3	3:00
2026-03-28	Win	(Italy) Luca Grusovin	La Nuit des Titans 2026, Semifinals	Tours, France	KO (Knee to the body)	2	
Parra withdrew from the tournament due to injury.
2025-11-22	Win	(France) Fabio Loisi	La Nuit des Champions 32	Marseille, France	KO (Spinning backfist)	2	1:00
Wins La Nuit des Champions -60 kg title.
2025-05-31	Win	(Japan) Tomoya Yokoyama	K-1 Beyond - Super Featherweight Championship Tournament, Final	Yokohama, Japan	TKO (3 Knockdowns)	2	1:10
Wins the 2025 K-1 Super Featherweight Championship Tournament and the vacant K-1 Super Featherweight (-60kg) title.
2025-05-31	Win	(Japan) Chihiro Nakajima	K-1 Beyond - Super Featherweight Championship Tournament, Semifinals	Yokohama, Japan	TKO (2 knockdowns)	2	1:52
2025-05-31	Win	(Japan) Yuta Matsuyama	K-1 Beyond - Super Featherweight Championship Tournament, Quarterfinals	Yokohama, Japan	KO (Left cross)	1	1:45
2025-03-22	Win	(Italy) Lenny Blasi	The Arena - Warrior's Legacy	Campione d'Italia, Italy	KO (Punches)	4	
Wins the vacant ISKA Oriental rules Super-lightweight (63.5kg) title.
2025-02-22	Win	(France) Jérémy Monteiro	La Nuit des Titans	Tours, France	Decision	5	3:00
Wins the vacant La Nuit des Titans K-1 65kg title.
2025-01-26	Win	(Suriname) Gordon Kalaykhan	BFS Event V	Nimes, France	Decision (Unanimous)	3	3:00
2024-12-14	Win	(Spain) Alejandro Lopez Vallejo	Carcharias Fight Event 2024	Perpignan, France	TKO (Body kick)	1	
2024-11-16	Win	(Spain) Aitor Currito	La Nuit des Champions 31, Final	Marseille, France	Decision (Unanimous)	3	3:00
Wins La Nuit des Champions 64.5kg title.
2024-11-16	Win	(France) Lorenzo Sammartino	La Nuit des Champions 31, Semifinals	Marseille, France	Decision (Unanimous)	3	3:00
2024-10-05	Win	(Spain) Andoni Iglesias	Iruna Warriors	Pamplona, Spain	TKO (Corner stoppage)	3	
Wins the interim WAKO-Pro Low Kick World Light Welterweight (-64.5kg) title.
2024-08-10	Win	(Spain) Umar Abubakar	Gladiator's Boxing Series 2	La Londe-les-Maures, France	Decision	3	3:00
2024-07-20	Loss	(Italy) Achraf Aasila	Le Choc des Gladiateurs 22	Le Lavandou, France	Decision (Majority)	3	3:00
2024-03-20	Loss	(Japan) Hirotaka Asahisa	K-1 World MAX 2024 - World Tournament Opening Round	Tokyo, Japan	Decision (Unanimous)	3	3:00
2024-01-27	Win	(France) Bryan Lang	Emperor Chok Dee 2024	Vandœuvre-lès-Nancy, France	Decision (Split)	5	3:00
Defends the WAKO-Pro K-1 World Super Lightweight (-62.2kg) title.
2023-12-09	Win	(Japan) Leona Pettas	K-1 ReBIRTH 2	Osaka, Japan	Decision (Majority)	3	3:00
2023-08-12	Win	(Spain) Ernesto De La Colina	Gladiator's Boxing Series	La Londe-les-Maures, France	TKO (Referee stoppage)	3	
2023-07-22	Win	(Morocco) Mehdi El Jamari	Le Choc des Gladiateurs 21	Le Lavandou, France	KO (Left hook)	2	1:15
2023-05-13	Win	(France) Djany Fiorenti	Le Choc des Etoiles 7	Châteauneuf-les-Martigues, France	Decision (Unanimous)	5	3:00
Defends the WAKO-Pro K-1 World Super Lightweight (-62.2kg) title.
2023-01-20	Win	(Romania) Mihai Rusu	United Fight Night	Brest, France	KO (Low kick)	1	
2022-12-03	Win	(Belgium) Hicham Moujtahid	TKR	Bezons, France	TKO (retirement)	4	3:00
Wins the vacant WAKO-Pro K-1 World Super Lightweight (-62.2kg) title.
2022-10-23	Win	(Belgium) Alban Bakija	Fight and Dance Championship	Brussels, Belgium	Decision	3	3:00
2022-07-23	Win	(France) Luc Genieys	Le Choc des Gladiateurs 20	Le Lavandou, France	TKO (Low kicks)	2	
2022-05-14	Win	(Cambodia) Sunny Po	Fight Stadium	Tergnier, France	KO (Spinning back fist)	2	
2022-03-20	Win	(Belgium) Hicham Moujtahid	Fight For Honor VIII	Grimbergen, Belgium	Decision	3	3:00
2022-01-29	Win	(Italy) Ricardo Cristiani	Thai Boxe Mania 2022	Turin, Italy	TKO (Low kicks)	3	
Wins IKBO World -62kg title.
2021-11-21	Loss	(France) Djany Fiorenti	EMP Fight Night, Tournament Semifinals	Brussels, Belgium	Decision	3	3:00
2021-10-23	Win	(United Kingdom) Josh Thomas	Show Rebellion	Windsor, England	TKO	3	
2021-10-09	Win	(France) Wassim El Mestari	Box'in Night	Nimes, France	TKO (Corner stoppage)	3	
2019-11-30	Win	(France) Benslimane Iheb	Gala Du Carcharias	Perpignan, France	Decision	3	3:00
2019-10-13	Win	(France) Nicolas Herry	MK Muay Thai Fight	Nimes, France	Decision	3	3:00
Legend: Win Loss Draw/No contest Notes

== See also ==
- List of male kickboxers
