= Leona Pettas =

Japanese kickboxer

- Born: Reona Kato (玲於奈 加藤); April 29, 1992 (age 34); Iruma, Japan
- Height: 175 cm (5 ft 9 in)
- Weight: 60 kg (130 lb; 9.4 st)
- Division: Bantamweight
- Style: Kyokushin Karate, kickboxing
- Stance: Orthodox
- Fighting out of: Tagajō, Miyagi Prefecture, Japan
- Team: BungelingBay Gym (2012-2017); THE SPIRIT GYM TEAM TOP ZEROS (2018-present)
- Trainer: Hidetoshi Hanzawa; Nicholas Pettas
- Years active: 2012 - present

Kickboxing record
- Total: 45
- Wins: 35
- By knockout: 16
- Losses: 9
- By knockout: 2
- Draws: 1

Other information
- Notable relatives: Kona Kato (brother)

Leona Pettas (Japanese: レオナ・ペタス, Leona Pettas; born April 29, 1992) is a Japanese kickboxer, currently competing in the super featherweight division of K-1, where he is the former Super Featherweight champion. He took the family name of his first trainer Karateka Nicholas Pettas. Pettas is the 2022 K-1 Super Featherweight World Grand Prix winner, the former Krush Super Featherweight champion and a one-time K-1 super featherweight title challenger.

He was ranked as a top ten bantamweight by Combat Press between September 2020 and July 2022, peaking at #2. Combat Press ranked him the #4 Flyweight in May and June 2019, and #3 Flyweight between July 2019 and August 2020.

== Kickboxing career ==
=== Early career ===
==== Career beginnings ====
Pettas made his professional debut against Shota, during Krush-EX 2012 vol.3 on June 17, 2012. He won the fight by a first-round knockout. Pettas was booked to fight Yoshikazu Isobe at Krush-EX 2012 vol.5 on October 21, 2012. He fight which he won by technical knockout, 22 second into the second round.

Pettas suffered his first professional loss on January 14, 2013, at Krush Grand Prix 2013, when he dropped a unanimous decision to Katsuya Goto.

Pettas rebounded from this loss by winning his next three fights. Pettas first knocked out Hitoshi Aketo in the second round at Krush-IGNITION 2013 vol.3 on April 21, 2013. He followed this up with unanimous decision win against Junpei Aotsu at Krush.30 on August 11, 2013. Pettas extended his winning streak to three consecutive fights at Krush.36 on April 1, 2014, as he beat Takeshi Watanabe by unanimous decision.

Leona's three fight winning streak was snapped by Kotaro Shimano at Krush.39 on March 8, 2014, who stopped Pettas by technical knockout in the first round.

Pettas won four of his next six fights. He won decisions against Tomohiro Kitai at Krush.41 on May 11, 2014, Keisuke Nakamura at Krush.54 on May 4, 2015, and Masahiro Yamamoto at Krush.56 on August 14, 2016, and stopped Toshi with a head kick at Krush.46 on October 5, 2014. During this run, Pettas drew against Fumiya Osawa at Krush.44 on August 9, 2014, and lost a unanimous decision against Haruaki Otsuki at Krush.50 on January 4, 2015.

==== Hero Legends tournament ====
Pettas made his K-1 debut at K-1 World GP 2015 The Championship against Taiga Kawabe on November 21, 2015. He won the fight by majority decision. Pettas then faced Toshi at K-1 World GP 2016 -60kg Japan Tournament on April 24, 2016. He lost the rematch by unanimous decision.

Leona Pettas participated in the 2016 Hero Legends 60 kg tournament. He defeated Zhou Biao by decision in the first round, Xie Yuhang by TKO in the quarterfinals, Feng Tianhao by KO in the semifinals, and won the tournament with a decision win over Li Qiyu.

=== Rise up the ranks ===
==== Krush Super Featherweight tournament ====
Pettas returned to Krush in order to face Yuta Takahashi. Their fight was scheduled for the undercard of Krush.71, which took place on December 12, 2016. He won the fight by unanimous decision, with two scorecards of 30–26 and once scorecard of 30–27. After notching his first win under the Krush banner in two years, Pettas took part in the 2017 Krush Super Featherweight tournament. He faced Hayato, in the tournament quarterfinals, at Krush.73 on February 18, 2017. He won the fight by unanimous decision.

Pettas faced Taio Asahisa in the tournament semifinals at Krush.75 on April 2, 2017. He won the fight by a unanimous decision (30–27, 29–27, 29–27). Pettas handed Asahisa the first knockdown of his professional career, in the first round of the fight. Pettas faced Riku Anpo in the final bout of the tournament at Krush.76 on May 28, 2017. He lost the fight by unanimous decision. Two of the judges scored the fight 30–28 for Anpo, while the third judge scored the fight 30–29 in his favor.

==== Second title run ====
Pettas faced Yoshiki Harada at Krush.83 on December 9, 2017. He won the fight by a second-round knockout, stopping Harada with a flurry of punches at the 1:03 minute mark.

Petas faced Yuma Saikyo at Krush 87 on April 22, 2018, in his first fight of the year. He won the fight by unanimous decision, with scores of 29–28, 30–29 and 29–28. Leona then faced Zhao Chongyang during Krush 90 on July 22, 2018. He beat Chongyang by a second-round knockout.

Pettas faced Taio Asahisa at Krush.98 on February 16, 2019. The fight was a rematch of their April 2, 2017, which Pettas won the fight by unanimous decision. He won the rematch the same manner, by unanimous decision.

Pettas faced the former RISE Super Featherweight champion Kosuke Komiyama at K-1 World GP 2019: Super Bantamweight World Tournament on June 30, 2019. Extending his winning streak to five, Pettas knocked Komiyama out with a left jab in the second round.

=== Krush super featherweight champion ===
==== Title reign ====
Pettas was rewarded for his five-fight winning streak with the chance to challenge the reigning Krush Super Featherweight champion Yuma Saikyo, in what was Saikyo's first title defense. The bout was scheduled as the main event of Krush.105, which took place on September 16, 2019. Pettas won the fight by a narrow majority decision, with scores of 29–28, 30–28 and 29–29.

Pettas made his first Krush title defense against Naoki Yamamoto at Krush 109 on December 15, 2019. He won the fight by a second-round technical knockout. During his post-fight speech, Pettas called for a fight with the K-1 super featherweight champion Takeru Segawa, stating: "There are no Japanese fighters anymore [who could challenge him]".

Petas faced the former K-1 Featherweight and RISE Bantamweight champion Yuta Murakoshi at K-1: K’Festa 3 on March 22, 2020. He won the fight by a third-round technical knockout. Pettas knocked Murakoshi down with a right hook in the first round and, while a second hook in the third round was enough to finish the fight. He once again called for a fight with Takeru during his post-fight interview.

Pettas made his second Krush title defense against Takeru's teammate Tatsuya Oiwa at Krush 115 on June 28, 2020. He won the fight by unanimous decision, with scores of 30–29, 30–29 and 30–28.

==== Pettas vs. Takeru ====
Pettas was finally booked to face the K-1 super featherweight champion Takeru Segawa at K-1 World GP 2020 in Fukuoka on November 3, 2020. Due to his stature, particular skilleset and good run of form, Pettas was considered as one of the toughest challenges in Takeru's career up to that point. At the time of the fight's scheduling, Takeru was ranked as the best fighter under 60 kg. On October 9, 2020, it was revealed that Takeru had withdrawn from the bout after he had suffered a fracture in his left hand during training, and which would require surgery. The fight was rescheduled for K-1: K’Festa 4 on January 24, 2021, but was once again postponed on January 7 as the Japanese government declared a state of emergency due to the COVID-19 pandemic. The fight was once again rescheduled for K'Festa 4 Day 2, which took place on March 28, 2021. Despite a good start to the fight which saw him successfully utilize his height and reach to outfight, Pettas was knocked down with a left hook in the dying seconds of the opening round. He failed to recover sufficiently during the one-minute break in between the rounds, and was knocked out with a flurry of punches at the 1:10 minute mark of the second round.

=== K-1 super featherweight champion ===
==== Pre-championship catchweight bouts ====
Pettas vacated Krush super featherweight title on September 3, 2021, with the intention of moving up to lightweight (62.5 kg). He faced Maki Chatchai, in a 61.5 kg catchweight bout, at K-1 World GP 2021 in Osaka on December 4, 2021. Pettas won the fight by unanimous decision, with all three judges scoring the fight 30–26 in his favor. He scored the sole knockdown of the fight in the first round, dropping Maki with a right straight.

Pettas next faced Kan Nakamura at The Match 2022 on June 19, 2022. He was surprised with the booking, stating: "Personally I thought I might fight Shiratori...When they gave me Nakamura, I watched his fights and he looked good, but his opponents were weak". Despite coming in as the favorite, he lost the fight by an upset majority decision. Two of the judges scored the bout 30–29 for Nakamura, while the third judge scored it as an even 30–30 draw.

==== K-1 Super Featherweight World Grand Prix ====
Pettas participated in the 2022 K-1 Super Featherweight World Grand Prix, held to crown a new divisional kingpin after the previous champion Takeru Segawa vacated the belt. Pettas faced Ayoub Segiri in the tournament quarterfinals at K-1 World GP 2022 Yokohamatsuri on September 11, 2022. He had a poor start to the fight, as he was knocked down with a left hook near the end of the opening round. Pettas was able to rebound in the following round however, and knocked Segiri out with his own left hook at the 1:01 minute mark. Pettas faced Tatsuya Oiwa in the penultimate bout of the one-day tournament, an opponent he had previously faced and beaten in his second Krush Super Featherweight title defense on June 28, 2020. He was equally successful in their second meeting and won the fight by a third-round knockout. Petttas faced the Wu Lin Feng -60 kg champion Hirotaka Asahisa in the tournament final. He won the fight by unanimous decision, with all three judges scoring the bout 30–29 in his favor. Winning the vacant title earned Pettas the eFight "Fighter of the Month" award for the month of September as well.

==== After the Grand Prix ====
Pettas faced the once-defeated WAKO Pro K-1 World Super Lightweight champion Rémi Parra in a non-title bout at K-1 ReBIRTH 2 on December 9, 2023. He lost the fight by majority decision, with scores of 30–29, 30–29 and 29–29.

Pettas vacated the K-1 Super Featherweight title on January 29, 2025.

Pettas faced Sota Amano in a super featherweight reserve bout at K-1 Beyond - Super Featherweight Championship Tournament on May 31, 2025. Amano weighed 2 kg over the limit, received a two-point deduction and was illegible to participate in the tournament as a reservist. Pettas won the fight by a first-round knockout. Pettas was unable to participate in the tournament as he broke his hand during the Amano fight.

Pettas faced the 2025 K-1 Super Featherweight Championship Tournament Runner-up Tomoya Yokoyama at K-1 World MAX 2025 - 70kg World Championship Tournament Final on November 15, 2025. He was knocked down at the end of the first round and lost the fight by unanimous decision, with scores of 30–27, 30—27 and 29–28.

== Titles and accomplishments ==
Professional

- Krush
  - 2017 Krush Super Featherweight Tournament runner-up
  - 2019 Krush Super Featherweight Championship
    - Two successful title defenses
- Hero Legends
  - 2016 Hero Legends -60 kg Asia Tournament Champion
- K-1
  - 2022 K-1 Super Featherweight World Grand Prix winner
  - 2022 K-1 Super Featherweight Championship

Amateur

- Shin Karate
  - 2009 108th Shin Karate K-3 Lightweight Tournament runner-up
  - 2011 Tokyo Region Shin Karate K-2 Lightweight Tournament winner
  - 2011 All Japan Shin Karate K-2 Lightweight Grand Prix runner-up
- J-NETWORK
  - 2011 J-NETWORK All Japan A-League Featherweight Champion

Awards

- K-1
  - 2021 K-1 Awards Fight of the Year (vs. Takeru)
- eFight.jp
  - Fighter of the Month (July 2020, September 2022)

== Kickboxing record ==
Kickboxing record
35 wins (16 (T)KOs), 9 losses, 1 draw, 0 no contests
Date	Result	Opponent	Event	Location	Method	Round	Time
2026-09-05	Win	(Cambodia) Koramak Chanrach	KNOCK OUT.68 ～KNOCKIN' on the WORLD～	Yokohama, Japan	Decision (majority)	3	3:00
2026-06-21	Win	(Japan) Hiroki Naruo	KNOCK OUT.65 - THE KNOCK OUT 2026	Tokyo, Japan	KO (punches)	2	0:29
2025-11-15	Loss	(Japan) Tomoya Yokoyama	K-1 World MAX 2025 - 70kg World Championship Tournament Final	Yokohama, Japan	Decision (unanimous)	3	3:00
2025-05-31	Win	(Japan) Sota Amano	K-1 Beyond - Super Featherweight Championship Tournament, Reserve	Yokohama, Japan	KO (right cross)	1	2:16
2023-12-09	Loss	(France) Rémi Parra	K-1 ReBIRTH 2	Osaka, Japan	Decision (majority)	3	3:00
2022-09-11	Win	(Japan) Hirotaka Asahisa	K-1 World GP 2022 Yokohamatsuri, Tournament Final	Yokohama, Japan	Decision (unanimous)	3	3:00
Won the 2022 K-1 Super Featherweight World Grand Prix and the vacant K-1 Super Featherweight title.
2022-09-11	Win	(Japan) Tatsuya Oiwa	K-1 World GP 2022 Yokohamatsuri, Tournament Semifinals	Yokohama, Japan	KO (flying knee)	3	0:12
2022-09-11	Win	(Spain) Ayoub Segiri	K-1 World GP 2022 Yokohamatsuri, Tournament Quarterfinals	Yokohama, Japan	KO (punch)	2	1:01
2022-06-19	Loss	(Japan) Kan Nakamura	THE MATCH 2022	Tokyo, Japan	Decision (majority)	3	3:00
2021-12-04	Win	(Thailand) Chatchai Maki	K-1 World GP 2021 in Osaka	Osaka, Japan	Decision (unanimous)	3	3:00
2021-03-28	Loss	(Japan) Takeru	K-1 World GP 2021: K’Festa 4 Day.2	Tokyo, Japan	KO (punches)	2	1:10
For the K-1 Super Featherweight title.
2020-06-28	Win	(Japan) Tatsuya Oiwa	Krush 115	Tokyo, Japan	Decision (unanimous)	3	3:00
Defends the Krush Super Featherweight title.
2020-03-22	Win	(Japan) Yuta Murakoshi	K-1: K’Festa 3	Saitama, Japan	TKO (punches)	3	2:33
2019-12-15	Win	(Japan) Naoki Yamamoto	Krush.109	Tokyo, Japan	TKO (punches)	2	2:08
Defends the Krush Super Featherweight title.
2019-09-16	Win	(Japan) Yuma Saikyo	Krush.105	Tokyo, Japan	Decision (majority)	3	3:00
Wins the Krush Super Featherweight title.
2019-06-30	Win	(Japan) Kosuke Komiyama	K-1 World GP 2019: Super Bantamweight World Tournament	Saitama, Japan	KO (left jab)	2	2:14
2019-02-16	Win	(Japan) Taio Asahisa	Krush.98	Tokyo, Japan	Decision (unanimous)	3	3:00
2018-07-22	Win	(China) Zhao Chongyang	Krush.90	Tokyo, Japan	KO (punches)	2	2:49
2018-04-22	Win	(Japan) Yuma Saikyo	Krush.87	Tokyo, Japan	Decision (unanimous)	3	3:00
2017-12-09	Win	(Japan) Yoshiki Harada	Krush.83	Tokyo, Japan	KO (punches)	2	1:03
2017-05-28	Loss	(Japan) Riku Anpo	Krush.76, Tournament Final	Tokyo, Japan	Decision (unanimous)	3	3:00
For the vacant Krush Super Featherweight title.
2017-04-02	Win	(Japan) Taio Asahisa	Krush.75, Tournament Semifinal	Tokyo, Japan	Decision (unanimous)	3	3:00
2017-02-18	Win	(Japan) Hayato	Krush.73, Tournament Quarterfinal	Tokyo, Japan	Decision (unanimous)	3	3:00
2016-12-18	Win	(Japan) Yuta Takahashi	Krush.71	Tokyo, Japan	Decision (unanimous)	3	3:00
2016-10-02	Win	(China) Li Qiyu	Hero Legends -60 kg Asia Tournament, Final	China	Decision	3	3:00
Wins the Hero Legends -60kg Asia Tournament title.
2016-10-02	Win	(China) Feng Tianhao	Hero Legends -60 kg Asia Tournament, Semi Finals	China	KO (body shot)	3	
2016-08-20	Win	(China) Xie Yuhang	Hero Legends -60 kg Asia Tournament, Quarter Finals	China	TKO (knee)	1	0:26
2016-08-20	Win	(China) Zhou Biao	Hero Legends -60 kg Asia Tournament, First Round	China	Decision	3	3:00
2016-04-24	Loss	(Japan) Toshi	K-1 World GP 2016 -60kg Japan Tournament	Tokyo, Japan	Decision (unanimous)	3	3:00
2015-11-21	Win	(Japan) Taiga	K-1 World GP 2015 The Championship	Japan	Decision (majority)	3	3:00
2015-08-14	Win	(Japan) Masahiro Yamamoto	Krush.56	Japan	Decision (unanimous)	3	3:00
2015-05-04	Win	(Japan) Keisuke Nakamura	Krush.54	Japan	Decision (unanimous)	3	3:00
2015-01-04	Loss	(Japan) Haruaki Otsuki	Krush.50	Japan	Decision (unanimous)	3	3:00
2014-10-05	Win	(Japan) Toshi	Krush.46	Tokyo, Japan	KO (right high kick)	1	2:21
2014-08-09	Draw	(Japan) Fumiya Osawa	Krush.44	Tokyo, Japan	Decision	3	3:00
2014-05-11	Win	(Japan) Tomohiro Kitai	Krush.41	Tokyo, Japan	Decision (unanimous)	3	3:00
2014-03-08	Loss	(Japan) Kotaro Shimano	Krush.39	Tokyo, Japan	TKO (doctor Stoppage)	1	1:03
2014-01-04	Win	(Japan) Takeshi Watanabe	Krush.36	Tokyo, Japan	Decision (unanimous)	3	3:00
2013-08-11	Win	(Japan) Junpei Aotsu	Krush.30	Tokyo, Japan	Decision (unanimous)	3	3:00
2013-04-21	Win	(Japan) Hitoshi Aketo	Krush-IGNITION 2013 vol.3	Tokyo, Japan	KO (punches)	2	0:44
2013-01-14	Loss	(Japan) Katsuya Goto	Krush Grand Prix 2013	Tokyo, Japan	Decision (unanimous)	3	3:00
2012-10-21	Win	(Japan) Yoshikazu Isobe	Krush-EX 2012 vol.5	Tokyo, Japan	TKO	2	0:22
2012-08-12	Win	(Japan) Ryutaro Takahashi	Krush 21	Tokyo, Japan	KO (right cross)	1	1:41
2012-06-17	Win	(Japan) Shota	Krush-EX 2012 vol.3	Tokyo, Japan	KO	1	2:03
Legend: Win Loss Draw/no contest Notes

Amateur kickboxing record
Date	Result	Opponent	Event	Location	Method	Round	Time
2012-04-01	Win	(Japan) Yukinori Ogasawara	Rebels Amateur Tournament - 4th Blow Cup	Tokyo, Japan	Decision (unanimous)	2	2:00
2011-09-11	Win	(Japan) Shuichi Fujihara	J-NETWORK Amateur All Japan A-League, Final	Japan	Decision (unanimous)		
Wins J-NETWORK All Japan A-League Featherweight title.
2011-09-11	Win	(Japan) Hiroshi Nakazawa	J-NETWORK Amateur All Japan A-League, Semi Final	Japan	Decision (unanimous)		
2011-09-11	Win	(Japan) Masaki Takemura	J-NETWORK Amateur All Japan A-League, Quarter Final	Japan	Decision (unanimous)		
2009-08-15	Win	(Japan) Toshimichi Omata	Utsunomiya Shukenden vol.3 ～Challenge of UTSUNOMIYA's fighter～	Utsunomiya, Japan	KO	1	1:03
2009-06-28	Loss	(Japan) Tsukasa Fuji	K-1 Koshien 2009 Kanto Region Selection A-Block Tournament, Quarter Final	Kisarazu, Japan	Decision (unanimous)	1	2:00
2009-06-28	Win	(Japan)	K-1 Koshien 2009 Kanto Region Selection A-Block Tournament, First Round	Kisarazu, Japan	KO	1	2:00
2009-04-26	Win	(Japan) Koji Sato	Challenge Spirit - Destiny	Tokyo, Japan	KO		
Legend: Win Loss Draw/no contest Notes

== See also ==
- List of male kickboxers
- List of Krush champions
