= Issei Ishii =

Japanese kickboxer and Muay Thai fighter

- Born: September 15, 1998 (age 28); Fukuoka, Japan
- Other names: Sunrise Prince; Issei Wor.Wanchai (อิเซ ว.วันชัย)
- Height: 1.65 m (5 ft 5 in)
- Weight: 53 kg (117 lb; 8.3 st)
- Division: Flyweight
- Style: Muay Thai, kickboxing
- Stance: Orthodox
- Fighting out of: Fukuoka, Japan
- Team: Tokyo KBA; Team Warugaki; Excidecon Gym; Wor.Wanchai
- Years active: 2013 - present

Kickboxing record
- Total: 72
- Wins: 49
- By knockout: 23
- Losses: 19
- By knockout: 1
- Draws: 4

Other information
- Notable relatives: Jurai Ishii (nephew)
- Website: https://ishii-issei.com/

Issei Ishii (石井一成, Ishii Issei; born September 15, 1998) is a Japanese kickboxer and Muay Thai fighter. He is a former K-1 Bantamweight Champion and WBC Muay Thai world champion.

== Martial arts career ==
=== KNOCK OUT ===
Ishii faced the one-time Lumpinee Stadium flyweight title challenger Kazuki Osaki for the inaugural KNOCK OUT Flyweight championship at KING OF KNOCK OUT 2018 on December 9, 2018. He won the fight by majority decision, with all three judges scoring the bout 49–48 in his favor.

Ishii faced Yoddoy Kaewsamrit for the WPMF World Flyweight championship in his next fight, at KODO 4 on February 24, 2019. He won the fight by a third-round technical knockout.

After capturing the KNOCK OUT and WPMF titles, Ishii fought Petchthailand Moopingaroijung for the vacant IBF Muay Thai World Flyweight title at the June 12, 2019 Suk Wan Kingthong event. He won the fight by a third-round knockout, stopping Petchthailand with a spinning backfist at the very end of the round. Petchthailand and Ishii fought an immediate rematch at the August 9, 2019 True4U event, with the WBC Muay Thai World Super Flyweight title on the line. Ishii lost the fight by decision, with scores of 48–49, 47–49 and 47–50.

Ishii faced Nuapetch KelaSport in a non-title bout at the November 13, 2019 Suk Wan Kingthong event. He won the fight by third-round technical knockout.

=== Battle of Muaythai ===
Ishii was booked to face Hiroyuki for the Battle of Muay Thai Super Flyweight title at BOM WAVE 01 ~ Get Over The COVID-19 on June 28, 2020. He won the fight by unanimous decision, with two judges scoring the bout 49–47 in his favor, while the third judge scored the bout 50–47 in his favor.

Ishii faced Yuya Iwanami in a non-title bout at NO KICK NO LIFE ~Shin Shou~ Diamond FES on October 29, 2020. He won his promotional debut by a second-round technical knockout, after he forced Iwanami's corner to throw in the towel.

Ishii made his first BoM Super Flyweight title defense against Satoshi Katashima at BOM WAVE 01 ~ Get Over The COVID-19 on December 6, 2020. Aside from Ishii's title, the WPMF World Super Flyweight title was on the line as well. Ishii won the fight by unanimous decision, with scores of 50–46, 49–48 and 49–47.

Ishii faced Reiya in a non-title bout at NO KICK NO LIFE ~Shin Shou~ Ungaisouten on February 24, 2021. He won the fight by unanimous decision, with all three judges awarding him a 30–28 scorecard. Ishii faced Sanchai TeppenGym in another non-title bout at BOM WAVE 04 – Get Over The COVID-19 on April 11, 2021. He won the fight by a fourth-round knockout.

Ishii was booked to face Kazuki Osaki at RISE WORLD SERIES 2021 on July 18, 2021, in the semifinals of the 2021 RISE Dead or Alive super flyweight tournament. The winner of the tournament was expected to face Tenshin Nasukawa in his final bout with the promotion. Ishii lost his RISE debut by unanimous decision, with scores of 29-28, 29-28 and 29-27.

Ishii returned to Battle of Muaythai for his next fight, a non-title bout against Kojima Nor.Naksin at BOM WAVE 06 – Get Over The COVID-19 on November 7, 2021. He won the fight by unanimous decision, with all three judges scoring it 49–48 for Ishii.

On January 9, 2021 Ishii faced Ryu Hanaoka at the NO KICK NO LIFE event. He lost by unanimous decision after five rounds.

Ishii faced Khun Namisan Shobukai at BOM WAVE 08 – Get Over The COVID-19 on April 24, 2022, in his final fight with the promotion before signing with K-1. He won the fight by a second-round knockout.

=== K-1 ===
On June 14, 2022, it was revealed that Ishii had signed with K-1. He was booked to make his promotional debut against Kazuki Fujita at K-1 World GP 2022 in Fukuoka on August 11, 2022. Ishii won the fight by a third-round knockout, flooring Fujita with a right straight at the 2:41 minute mark of the round.

Ishii faced Detchphet Wor.Sangprapai for the vacant WBC MuayThai World Super Flyweight title at The Battle of Muay Thai "OUROBOROS" on September 23, 2022. He won the fight by knockout in the first round with a series of left hooks.

Ishii faced the undefeated WKA World -54 kg champion Oscar Bohorquez in the quarterfinals of the 2022 K-1 Bantamweight World Grand Prix. The one-day tournament, held to crown the inaugural K-1 bantamweight champion, was held at K-1 World GP 2022 in Osaka on December 3, 2022. He forced a referee stoppage with a flurry of punches with 13 seconds left in the second round and advanced to the semifinals, where he faced the reigning Krush Bantamweight champion Koji Ikeda. Ishii won the fight by unanimous decision, with scores of 30–29, 30–29 and 30–28. He advanced to the finals, where he faced the 2021 K-1 Japan Grand Prix winner Toma Kuroda. He lost the fight by split decision, after an extra fourth round was contested.

Ishii faced Yodsila Chor.Hapayak at K-1 World GP 2023: K'Festa 6 on March 12, 2023. Originally a unanimous decision loss for Ishii, the bout was later changed to a technical draw due to the second round knockdown being against the rules as it followed an illegal kick catch. The bout was rejudged without taking consideration of the second round and was declared a majority draw.

Ishii was expected to face Puen Sakyothin at BOM 40 on May 14, 2023. Puen withdrew from the bout on May 5, due to visa issues, and was replaced by Wasinchai SomsakKorsang. He won the fight by a first-round knockout.

Ishii made his Rajadamnern World Series debut against Eaktawan Sitcharnsing on July 22, 2023. He won the fight by a first-round knockout. Ishii made his next Rajadamnern World Series appearance against JJ Or.Pimonsri on September 9, 2023. He won the fight by a second-round knockout.

Ishii faced Pangtor Por.Lakboon at an October 28, 2023, Rajadamnern World Series event. He lost the fight by unanimous decision.

Ishii challenged the K-1 Bantamweight champion Toma Kuroda at K-1 ReBIRTH 2 on December 9, 2023. He lost the fight by unanimous decision.

Ishii faced Nampetch Chor.Champion at TOP BRIGHTS 1 on January 21, 2024. He won the fight by a first-round knockout.

Ishii faced Ryuki Matsuda at a Rajadamnern World Series Japan on April 14, 2024. The fight was ruled a unanimous decision draw.

Ishii faced Yusei Shirahata at K-1 Dontaku on July 13, 2025. He won the fight by split decision, after an extra fourth round was fought.

Ishii faced the current Krush Bantamweight champion Eito Kurokawa for the vacant K-1 Bantamweight (-53kg) title at K-1 World MAX 2025 - 70kg World Championship Tournament Final on November 15, 2025. He won the fight by unanimous decision, with three scorecards of 28—26 in his favor.

Ishii made his first K-1 Bantamweight (-53kg) title defense against Zhang Jinhui at K-1 World GP 2026 -90kg World Tournament on February 8, 2026. He retained the title by unanimous decision, with three scores of 30—29 in his favor.

== Championships and accomplishments ==
=== Amateur ===
- 2010 WINDY Super Fight -30 kg Champion
- 2010 M-1 -35 kg Champion
- 2010 King of Strikers -35 kg Champion
- 2011 Windy Super Fight -35 kg Champion
- 2011 TRIBELATE -35 kg Champion
- 2011 M-1 Junior -35 kg Champion
- 2011 King of Strikers -40 kg Champion
- 2012 Windy Kick Jr 40 kg Champion
- 2013 GLADIATOR Kick Jr 45 kg
- 2013 Trang Province 45 kg Champion

=== Professional ===
- Punpanmuang
  - 2014 Punpanmuang Mini Flyweight Champion
- True4U Muaymanwansuk
  - 2017 True4U Flyweight Champion
- KNOCK OUT
  - 2018 KING OF KNOCK OUT Flyweight Champion
  - 2019 IBF Muay Thai World Flyweight Champion
- World Professional Muaythai Federation
  - 2019 WPMF World Flyweight Champion
  - 2020 WPMF World Super Flyweight Champion
- The Battle of Muay Thai
  - 2020 Battle of Muay Thai Super Flyweight Champion (1 defense)
- World Boxing Council MuayThai
  - 2022 WBC MuayThai World Super Flyweight Champion
- K-1
  - 2022 K-1 Bantamweight World Grand Prix runner-up
  - 2025 K-1 Bantamweight Champion.
    - One successful title defense

== Fight record ==
Muay Thai and kickboxing record
48 wins (23 (T)KOs), 20 losses, 4 draws
| Date | Result | Opponent | Event | Location | Method | Round | Time |
| 2026-07-20 | Loss | (Japan) Neigo Katono | K-1 Dontaku 2026 | Fukuoka, Japan | TKO (3 knockdowns) | 2 | 2:46 |
Loses the K-1 Bantamweight (-53kg) title.
| 2026-02-08 | Win | (China) Zhang Jinhui | K-1 World GP 2026 - 90kg World Tournament | Tokyo, Japan | Decision (unanimous) | 3 | 3:00 |
Defends the K-1 Bantamweight (-53kg) title.
| 2025-11-15 | Win | (Japan) Eito Kurokawa | K-1 World MAX 2025 - 70kg World Championship Tournament Final | Tokyo, Japan | Decision (unanimous) | 3 | 3:00 |
Wins the vacant K-1 Bantamweight (-53kg) title.
| 2025-09-27 | Loss | (Thailand) Phusingha KlongsuanpluResort | Rajadamnern World Series | Bangkok, Thailand | Decision (split) | 3 | 3:00 |
| 2025-07-13 | Win | (Japan) Yusei Shirahata | K-1 Dontaku | Fukuoka, Japan | Ext.R decision (split) | 4 | 3:00 |
| 2025-06-15 | Win | (Thailand) Ritthiphan Phandakrattanaburi | Road to RWS Japan | Tokyo, Japan | KO (left hook) | 2 | 2:30 |
| 2025-03-08 | Loss | (Thailand) Jomhod Sitluangpeenamfon | Rajadamnern World Series | Bangkok, Thailand | Decision (unanimous) | 3 | 3:00 |
| 2024-12-28 | Win | (Thailand) Rachan Sor.Somnuk | Rajadamnern World Series | Bangkok, Thailand | Decision (unanimous) | 3 | 3:00 |
| 2024-10-19 | Loss | (Thailand) Petchbanrai Singhamawynn | Rajadamnern World Series | Bangkok, Thailand | Decision (unanimous) | 3 | 3:00 |
| 2024-07-14 | Loss | (Thailand) Pangtor Por.Lakboon | Rajadamnern World Series Japan | Chiba, Japan | Decision (unanimous) | 3 | 3:00 |
| 2024-04-14 | Draw | (Japan) Ryuki Matsuda | Rajadamnern World Series Japan | Chiba, Japan | Decision (unanimous) | 3 | 3:00 |
| 2024-03-09 | Win | (Thailand) Kongpayak Por.Lakboon | Rajadamnern World Series | Bangkok, Thailand | KO (left hook) | 1 | 111 |
| 2024-01-21 | Win | (Thailand) Nampetch Chor.Champion | TOP BRIGHTS 1 | Tokyo, Japan | KO (spinning back kick) | 1 | 1:50 |
| 2023-12-09 | Loss | (Japan) Toma Kuroda | K-1 ReBIRTH 2 | Osaka, Japan | Decision (unanimous) | 3 | 3:00 |
For the K-1 Bantamweight (-53kg) title.
| 2023-10-28 | Loss | (Thailand) Pangtor Por.Lakboon | Rajadamnern World Series | Bangkok, Thailand | Decision (unanimous) | 3 | 3:00 |
| 2023-09-09 | Win | (Thailand) JJ Or.Pimonsri | Rajadamnern World Series | Bangkok, Thailand | KO (right cross) | 2 | 0:44 |
| 2023-07-22 | Win | (Thailand) Eaktawan Sitcharnsing | Rajadamnern World Series | Bangkok, Thailand | KO (left hook to the body) | 1 | 2:49 |
| 2023-05-14 | Win | (Thailand) Wasinchai SomsakKorsang | BOM 40 | Fukuoka, Japan | KO (low kick) | 1 | 2:00 |
| 2023-03-12 | Draw | (Thailand) Yodsila Chor.Hapayak | K-1 World GP 2023: K'Festa 6 | Tokyo, Japan | Technical draw (majority) | 3 | 3:00 |
| 2022-12-03 | Loss | (Japan) Toma Kuroda | K-1 World GP 2022 in Osaka Bantamweight World Grand Prix, Final | Osaka, Japan | Ext.R decision (split) | 4 | 3:00 |
For the inaugural K-1 Bantamweight (-53 kg) title.
| 2022-12-03 | Win | (Japan) Koji Ikeda | K-1 World GP 2022 in Osaka Bantamweight World Grand Prix, Semi Final | Osaka, Japan | Decision (unanimous) | 3 | 3:00 |
| 2022-12-03 | Win | (Ecuador) Oscar Bohorquez | K-1 World GP 2022 in Osaka Bantamweight World Grand Prix, Quarter Final | Osaka, Japan | TKO (referee stoppage) | 2 | 2:47 |
| 2022-09-23 | Win | (Thailand) Detchphet Wor.Sangprapai | The Battle of Muay Thai "OUROBOROS" | Tokyo, Japan | KO (left hook to the body) | 1 | 1:03 |
Wins the vacant WBC MuayThai World Super Flyweight title.
| 2022-08-11 | Win | (Japan) Kazuki Fujita | K-1 World GP 2022 in Fukuoka | Fukuoka, Japan | KO (right straight) | 3 | 2:41 |
| 2022-06-26 | Win | (Thailand) Khunsuk Sor.Dechaphan | Suk Wan Kingthong "to challenge" | Tokyo, Japan | Decision (unanimous) | 5 | 3:00 |
| 2022-04-24 | Win | (Thailand) Khun Namisan Shobukai | BOM WAVE 08 – Get Over The COVID-19 | Beppu, Japan | KO (left hook) | 2 | 0:54 |
| 2022-01-09 | Loss | (Japan) Ryu Hanaoka | NO KICK NO LIFE | Tokyo, Japan | Decision (unanimous) | 5 | 3:00 |
| 2021-11-07 | Win | (Japan) Kojima Nor.Naksin | BOM WAVE 06 – Get Over The COVID-19 | Yokohama, Japan | Decision | 5 | 3:00 |
| 2021-07-18 | Loss | (Japan) Kazuki Osaki | RISE WORLD SERIES 2021 - Dead or Alive Tournament, Quarter Final | Osaka, Japan | Decision (unanimous) | 3 | 3:00 |
| 2021-04-11 | Win | (Thailand) Sanchai TeppenGym | BOM WAVE 04 – Get Over The COVID-19 | Yokohama, Japan | KO (kick to the body) | 4 | 2:30 |
| 2021-02-24 | Win | (Japan) Reiya | NO KICK NO LIFE ~Shin Shou~ Ungaisouten | Tokyo, Japan | Decision (unanimous) | 5 | 3:00 |
| 2020-12-06 | Win | (Japan) Satoshi Katashima | BOM WAVE 01 ~ Get Over The COVID-19 | Tokyo, Japan | Decision (unanimous) | 5 | 3:00 |
Wins WPMF World Super Flyweight title and defends the Battle of Muay Thai Super Flyweight title.
| 2020-10-29 | Win | (Japan) Yuya Iwanami | NO KICK NO LIFE ~Shin Shou~ | Tokyo, Japan | TKO (corner stoppage/elbow) | 2 | 2:09 |
| 2020-06-28 | Win | (Japan) Hiroyuki | BOM WAVE 01 ~ Get Over The COVID-19 | Tokyo, Japan | Decision (unanimous) | 5 | 3:00 |
Wins the Battle of Muay Thai Super Flyweight title.
| 2019-11-13 | Win | (Thailand) Nuapetch KelaSport | Suk Wan Kingthong | Tokyo, Japan | TKO (right cross) | 3 | 1:48 |
| 2019-08-09 | Loss | (Thailand) Petchthailand Moopingaroijung | True4u Lumpinee Stadium | Bangkok, Thailand | Decision (unanimous) | 5 | 3:00 |
For the WBC Muay Thai World Super Flyweight title.
| 2019-06-12 | Win | (Thailand) Petchthailand Moopingaroijung | Suk Wan Kingthong | Tokyo, Japan | KO (spinning back kick) | 3 | 3:06 |
Wins the vacant IBF Muay Thai World Flyweight Title.
| 2019-02-24 | Win | (Thailand) Yoddoy Kaewsamrit | KODO 4 | Oita, Japan | TKO (low kicks + punches) | 3 | |
Wins the WPMF World Flyweight Title.
| 2018-12-09 | Win | (Japan) Kazuki Osaki | KING OF KNOCK OUT 2018 | Tokyo, Japan | Decision (majority) | 5 | 3:00 |
Wins the inaugural KNOCK OUT Flyweight Title.
| 2018-10-07 | Win | (Japan) Taiga Nakayama | KNOCK OUT 2018 cross over | Tokyo, Japan | TKO (doctor stoppage) | 3 | 2:04 |
| 2018-08-19 | Win | (Japan) Jin Mandokoro | KNOCK OUT SUMMER FES.2018 | Tokyo, Japan | Decision (unanimous) | 5 | 3:00 |
| 2018-05-06 | Win | (Japan) Daishin Sakai | Rizin 10 | Tokyo, Japan | Decision (unanimous) | 3 | 3:00 |
| 2018-02-12 | Win | (Thailand) Nong Rose Banjaroensuk | KNOCK OUT First Impact | Tokyo, Japan | KO (punch to the body) | 2 | |
| 2017-12-10 | Win | (Japan) Tatsuya Noto | KING OF KNOCK OUT 2017 | Tokyo, Japan | Decision (unanimous) | 5 | 3:00 |
| 2017-10-15 | Loss | (Japan) Jin Mandokoro | Rizin World Grand Prix 2017: Opening Round - Part 2 | Fukuoka, Japan | Decision (majority) | 3 | 3:00 |
| 2017-08-06 | Win | (Thailand) Petek Sor.Saknarin | Rajadamnern Stadium | Bangkok, Thailand | Decision | 5 | 3:00 |
| 2017-06-17 | Loss | (Japan) Tatsuya Noto | KNOCK OUT vol.3 | Tokyo, Japan | TKO (punches) | 1 | 1:53 |
| 2017-05-05 | Loss | (Thailand) Senson Erawan | True4U, Rangsit Stadium | Rangsit, Thailand | Decision | 5 | 3:00 |
Loses the True4u Flyweight Title.
| 2017-04-01 | Win | (Japan) Naoya Yajima | KNOCK OUT vol.2 | Tokyo, Japan | Decision (majority) | 5 | 3:00 |
| 2017-02-17 | Win | (Thailand) Senson Erawan | True4U, Rangsit Stadium | Rangsit, Thailand | Decision | 5 | 3:00 |
Wins the True4u Flyweight Title.
| 2017-01-17 | Win | (Thailand) Chaimongkon Suknoigym | Muaymanwasuk, Rangsit Stadium | Rangsit, Thailand | KO (right elbow) | 3 | |
| 2016-12-28 | Win | (Thailand) Panlangun Or Wittachai | Suk Yodo Muay Thai Hilux Vigo | Saraburi Province, Thailand | TKO (low kicks) | 5 | 3:00 |
| 2016-11-16 | Win | (Thailand) Supernew Sor-Jor-Benspatchinburi | Suk Yodo Muay Thai Hilux Revo / True4u | Ayutthaya Province, Thailand | TKO (low kicks) | 2 | |
| 2016-09-30 | Win | (Thailand) Ningnoi Sikrufaew | Rangsit Stadium / True4u | Rangsit, Thailand | TKO (punches) | 2 | |
| 2016-07-30 | Win | (Thailand) Petnamnen Sitjomyut | Siam Omnoi Boxing Stadium | Samut Sakhon, Thailand | TKO | 4 | |
| 2016-06-19 | Win | (Thailand) Tapnar Sor.Waritar | Wanchai+Kingthong Rajadamnern Stadium | Bangkok, Thailand | KO | 3 | 2:37 |
| 2016-05-08 | Win | (Thailand) Petek Sor.Saknarin | Rajadamnern Stadium | Bangkok, Thailand | Decision | 5 | 3:00 |
| 2016-04-13 | Loss | (Thailand) Neonar Sisonram | Rajadamnern Stadium | Bangkok, Thailand | Decision | 5 | 3:00 |
| 2016-03-21 | Win | (Thailand) Petek Sor.Saknarin | Suk Yodo Muay Thai Hilux Vigo | Saraburi Province, Thailand | Decision | 5 | 3:00 |
| 2015-12-17 | Loss | (Thailand) Weeraponlek Kiatkonpon | Rajadamnern Stadium | Bangkok, Thailand | Decision | 5 | 3:00 |
| 2015-10-29 | Loss | (Thailand) Pepsi Kiatbanbai | Rajadamnern Stadium | Bangkok, Thailand | Decision | 5 | 3:00 |
| 2015-09-17 | Win | (Thailand) Panpon Sor.Warisattar | Rajadamnern Stadium | Bangkok, Thailand | Decision | 5 | 3:00 |
| 2015-08-03 | Loss | (Thailand) Panpon Sor.Warisattar | Rajadamnern Stadium | Bangkok, Thailand | Decision | 5 | 3:00 |
| 2015-06-06 | Win | (Thailand) Ekdecha Simnam | Lumpinee Stadium | Bangkok, Thailand | Decision | 5 | 3:00 |
| 2015-05-10 | Draw | (Japan) Kazuki Osaki | Wanchai + PK MuayThai Super Fight | Nagoya, Japan | Decision | 3 | 3:00 |
| 2015-02-23 | Loss | (Thailand) Petnakon Sor.Siripun | Rajadamnern Stadium | Bangkok, Thailand | Decision | 5 | 3:00 |
| 2014-12-27 | Draw | (Japan) Kazuki Osaki | Hoost Cup FOREVER | Nagoya, Japan | Decision | 3 | 3:00 |
| 2014-08-23 | Loss | (Thailand) Newsemsan Nondengym | Rajadamnern Stadium | Bangkok, Thailand | Decision | 5 | 3:00 |
| 2014-07-31 | Win | (Thailand) Parandet Sor.Petpubmee | Rajadamnern Stadium | Bangkok, Thailand | Decision | 5 | 3:00 |
| 2014-07-04 | Win | (Thailand) Bualuang Sitjakong | Lumpinee Stadium | Bangkok, Thailand | Decision | 5 | 3:00 |
| 2014-05-05 | Win | (Thailand) Makamlek Lukmakamwhan | Rajadamnern Stadium | Bangkok, Thailand | Decision | 5 | 3:00 |
| 2014-03-21 | Win | (Thailand) Kaichon Kaikanpon | TRIBELATE vol.42 × Pumpanmuang | Tokyo, Japan | TKO | 3 | 1:39 |
Wins the Punpanmuang Mini Flyweight Title.
| 2013-09-02 | Win | (Thailand) Phetpotong Lukmoo4 | Rajadamnern Stadium | Bangkok, Thailand | Decision | 5 | 3:00 |
| 2013-08-04 | Win | (Thailand) Phetpotong Lukmoo4 | Rajadamnern Stadium | Bangkok, Thailand | Decision | 5 | 3:00 |
| 2013-03-30 | Win | (Thailand) Daoplasuk Or.Bor.Tor Koskorn | Suk Wan Sor.Dedamrong + Chetunwa | Trang Province, Thailand | TKO (right cross) | 1 | |
Wins the Trang Province 45kg title.
Legend: Win Loss Draw/no contest Notes

=== Amateur record ===
Amateur Muay Thai and kickboxing record
71 wins, 20 losses, 10 draws
| Date | Result | Opponent | Event | Location | Method | Round | Time |
| 2013-03-16 | Win | (Thailand) Kasem Kalamram | 5th Muay Thai World Championship, Final | Bangkok, Thailand | Decision | 3 | 1:30 |
Wins Muay Thai World Championship Cadet (U-15) 45kg Gold Medal.
| 2013-02-24 | Win | (Korea) Kim Hyun Song | GLADIATOR 51 | Fukuoka, Japan | TKO | 1 | 1:30 |
Wins GLADIATOR Jr 45kg title.
| 2012-12-24 | Win | (Japan) | Japan Amateur Muaythai 2013 WMF World Championships Qualifying Competition | Tokyo, Japan | | | |
| 2012-08-26 | Loss | (Thailand) Kaipet Suwan-Aharn-Peekmai | JKMO - Japan Kick Muay Thai event | Tokyo, Japan | Extra round decision | | |
For the JKMO 40kg title.
| 2012-08-12 | Loss | (Thailand) Kaipet Suwan-Aharn-Peekmai | Windy Kick Japan vs Thailand | Saraburi Province, Thailand | Decision | | |
| 2012-07-22 | Win | (Japan) Reiji Hazuma | GLADIATOR 39 | Fukuoka Prefecture, Japan | Decision | 3 | 3:00 |
| 2012-07-01 | Win | (Japan) Takuma Ota | Muay Thai WINDY Super Fight in NAGOYA～MuayThaiphoon!～ | Nagoya, Japan | KO (front kick) | 1 | |
| 2012-06-10 | Win | (Japan) Kosuke Yamada | Muay Thai WINDY Super Fight vol.12 | Saraburi Province, Thailand | Decision | 5 | 1:30 |
Defends the Windy Kick Jr 40kg title.
| 2012-04-07 | Loss | (Thailand) Samingdam Sor.Kittibam | | Trang Province, Thailand | Decision | 5 | |
| 2012-03-12 | Win | (Japan) | Muay Thai WINDY Super Fight | Tokyo, Japan | Decision | | |
Wins the Windy Kick Jr 40kg title.
| 2012-02-26 | Draw | (Thailand) Chopperbank Rachanon | | Pattaya, Thailand | Decision | 5 | |
| 2011-12-18 | Loss | (Thailand) Apichit | Muay Thai WINDY Super Fight vol.10 2011 FINAL | Tokyo, Japan | Decision (split) | 5 | 1:30 |
For the WINDY Super Fight International -40kg title.
| 2011-11-19 | Win | (Japan) Chikara Iwao | TRIBELATE vol.35 -Title Match Festival- | Tokyo, Japan | Ext.R decision (split) | 3 | 2:00 |
| 2011-10-10 | Win | (Japan) Hikaru Fujimoto | KING OF STRIKERS Round 6 | Fukuoka Prefecture, Japan | Ext.R decision | 3 | 2:00 |
Wins the King of Strikers Jr -40kg title.
| 2011-09-23 | Win | (Japan) Daigo Sunaga | Muay Thai WINDY Super Fight vol.9 | Nagoya, Japan | Decision (unanimous) | 5 | 1:30 |
| 2011-07-31 | Win | (Japan) Kunito Tsuchiya | Muay Thai WINDY Super Fight vol.8 | Tokyo, Japan | Decision | 2 | |
Wins Windy SUper Fight -35kg title.
| 2011-07-16 | Win | (Japan) Chikara Iwao | TRIBELATE vol.33 | Tokyo, Japan | Decision | 3 | 2:00 |
Wins TRIBELATE -35kg title.
| 2011-07-03 | Win | (Japan) Kouki Yamada | Muay Thai WINDY Super Fight in NAGOYA ～Muay Typhoon!～ | Nagoya, Japan | Decision (unanimous) | 2 | 2:00 |
| 2011-06-19 | Win | (Japan) Shota Kuroki | M-1 FAIRTEX SINGHA BEERMuay Thai Challenge | Tokyo, Japan | Decision | 2 | 3:00 |
Wins the M-1 Junior -35kg title.
| 2011-04-10 | Win | (Japan) Yuki Kono | KING OF STRIKERS Round 4 | Fukuoka Prefecture, Japan | KO | 3 | |
| 2011-01-10 | Win | (Japan) Rikuto Tsuyama | M-1 Muay Thai Amateur Kyushu | Fukuoka Prefecture, Japan | KO | 2 | |
| 2010-11-07 | Loss | (Japan) Chikara Iwao | Muay Thai WINDY Super Fight vol.5 2010 FINAL | Tokyo, Japan | Decision (majority) | 2 | |
For the Windy SUper Fight -35kg title.
| 2010-09-19 | Loss | (Japan) Shota Kuroki | Muay Thai WINDY Super Fight vol.4 | Tokyo, Japan | Decision | | |
| 2010-06-14 | Win | (Japan) | Muay Thai WINDY Super Fight Vol.3 | Tokyo, Japan | Decision | | |
Wins Windy Super Fight -30kg title.
| 2010-03-04 | Loss | (Japan) Takahito Yamada | Muay Thai WINDY Super Fight Vol.2 | Tokyo, Japan | Decision | | |
For the Windy SUper Fight -30kg title.
| 2010-02-13 | Win | (Thailand) Denwanchai Wor.Wanchai | Muay Thai WINDY Super Fight in Kyushu | Kyushu, Japan | KO (right cross) | 3 | |
Legend: Win Loss Draw/no contest Notes

== See also ==
- List of male kickboxers
