= Eito Kurokawa =

Japanese kickboxer

- Born: 黒川瑛斗; November 28, 2003 (age 22); Chigasaki, Kanagawa, Japan
- Height: 169 cm (5 ft 7 in)
- Weight: 53 kg (117 lb; 8.3 st)
- Stance: Southpaw
- Fighting out of: Tokyo, Japan
- Team: Team VASILEUS (2025 - Present); K-1 Gym Sagami-Ono KREST (2020 - 2025)

Kickboxing record
- Total: 13
- Wins: 9
- By knockout: 3
- Losses: 3
- By knockout: 1
- Draws: 1

Eito Kurokawa (Japanese: 黒川瑛斗, Kurokawa Eito; born November 28, 2003) is a Japanese kickboxer. He is the current Krush Bantamweight champion.

As of June 2025 he was the 10th ranked -53 kg kickboxer in the world by Beyond Kickboxing.

== Biography and career ==
=== Early career ===
Kurokawa made his professional debut at Krush-EX 2022 vol.4 on May 28, 2022, against Kira. He won the fight by unanimous decision.

On September 11, 2022, Kurokawa made his K-1 debut at K-1 World GP 2022 Yokohamatsuri where he faced Seiya Nakazawa. The fight was declared a split decision draw by the judges after three rounds.

On November 12, 2022, Kurokawa faced Shinryu at Krush-EX 2022 vol.8. He won the fight by unanimous decision.

On April 28, 2023, Kurokawa defeated Riku Matsumoto by split decision at Krush 148.

On October 21, 2023, Kurokawa faced Rui Okubo at Krush 154. He lost the fight by unanimous decision.

On March 30, 2024, Kurokawa faced Yuya Uzawa at Krush 159. He won the fight by second round knockout.

On July 27, 2024, Kurokawa faced Yuya Hayashi in a Krush Bantamweight title eliminator at Krush 163. He won the fight by first round technical knockout after three knockdowns.

=== Krush champion ===
Kurokawa faced Yusei Shirahata for the vacant Krush Bantamweight (-53kg) title at Krush 166 on October 25, 2024. He won the fight by unanimous decision.

On March 30, 2025, Kurokawa made the first defense of his Krush Bantamweight title against Daina at Krush 172. He won the fight by knockout in the third round.

Kurokawa faced Issei Ishii for the vacant K-1 Bantamweight (-53kg) title at K-1 World MAX 2025 - 70kg World Championship Tournament Final on November 15, 2025. He lost the fight by unanimous decision, with three scorecards of 28—26 in Ishii's favor.

== Titles and accomplishments ==
=== Professional ===
- Krush
  - 2022 Krush Flyweight (-51kg) Champion
    - One successful title defense

=== Amateur ===
- 2020 K-1 Amateur All Japan B-class -55 kg Tournament Winner

== Fight record ==
Professional Kickboxing record
9 Wins (3 (T)KO's), 3 Losses, 1 Draw
Date	Result	Opponent	Event	Location	Method	Round	Time
2026-11-23		(Japan) Koji Ikeda	K-1 Revenge II	Tokyo, Japan			
2026-07-25	Win	(Japan) Futa Hashimoto	Krush 190	Tokyo, Japan	Decision (Unanimous)	3	3:00
2026-04-11	Loss	(Japan) Kojiro Shiba	K-1 Genki 2026	Tokyo, Japan	KO (Left cross)	3	2:27
2025-11-15	Loss	(Japan) Issei Ishii	K-1 World MAX 2025 - 70kg World Championship Tournament Final	Tokyo, Japan	Decision (Unanimous)	3	3:00
For the vacant K-1 Bantamweight (-53kg) title.
2025-03-30	Win	(Japan) Daina	Krush 172	Tokyo, Japan	KO (Left cross)	3	2:14
Defends the Krush Bantamweight (-53kg) title.
2024-10-25	Win	(Japan) Yusei Shirahata	Krush 166	Tokyo, Japan	Decision (Unanimous)	3	3:00
Wins the vacant Krush Bantamweight (-53kg) title.
2024-07-27	Win	(Japan) Yuya Hayashi	Krush 163	Tokyo, Japan	TKO (3 Knockdowns)	1	2:29
2024-03-30	Win	(Japan) Yuya Uzawa	Krush 159	Tokyo, Japan	KO (Left cross)	2	2:03
2023-10-21	Loss	(Japan) Rui Okubo	Krush 154	Tokyo, Japan	Decision (Unanimous)	3	3:00
2023-04-28	Win	(Japan) Riku Matsumoto	Krush 148	Tokyo, Japan	Decision (Split)	3	3:00
2023-03-04	Win	(Japan) Hiroki Yasui	Krush-EX 2023 vol.2	Tokyo, Japan	Decision (Unanimous)	3	3:00
2022-11-12	Win	(Japan) Shinryu	Krush-EX 2022 vol.8	Tokyo, Japan	Decision (Unanimous)	3	3:00
2022-09-11	Draw	(Japan) Seiya Nakazawa	K-1 World GP 2022 Yokohamatsuri	Yokohama, Japan	Decision (Split)	3	3:00
2022-05-28	Win	(Japan) Kira	Krush-EX 2022 vol.4	Tokyo, Japan	Decision (Unanimous)	3	3:00
Legend: Win Loss Draw/No contest Notes

=== Amateur record ===
Amateur Kickboxing record
Date	Result	Opponent	Event	Location	Method	Round	Time
2021-08-29	Loss	(Japan) Kosei Yoshida	K-1 Koshien 2021 Tournament, First Round	Tokyo, Japan	Ext.R Decision	2	2:00
2021-07-11	Loss	(Japan) Rui Okubo	K-1 Koshien 2021 East Japan Tournament, Quarterfinals	Tokyo, Japan	Decision (unanimous)	1	2:00
2021-07-11	Win	(Japan) Hideyuki Shimizu	K-1 Koshien 2021 East Japan Tournament, First Round	Tokyo, Japan	KO (flying knee)	1	
2021-04-11	Loss	(Japan) Kira Nakajima	10th K-1 Amateur All Japan Tournament, Semifinals	Tokyo, Japan	Decision (unanimous)	1	2:00
2021-04-11	Win	(Japan) Tatsuya Matsuo	10th K-1 Amateur All Japan Tournament, Quarterfinals	Tokyo, Japan	Decision (unanimous)	1	2:00
2020-11-08	Win	(Japan) Toshiki Hirayama	K-1 Amateur 34 - All Japan Tournament East Selection, Semifinals	Tokyo, Japan	Decision (split)	1	2:00
Wins K-1 Amateur All Japan Tournament East Selection and qualifies for the 10th All Japan Tournament.
2020-11-08	Win	(Japan) Kira Nakajima	K-1 Amateur 34 - All Japan Tournament East Selection, Semifinals	Tokyo, Japan	Decision (unanimous)	1	2:00
2020-11-08	Win	(Japan) Ryosuke Nagai	K-1 Amateur 34 - All Japan Tournament East Selection, Quarterfinals	Tokyo, Japan	Decision (unanimous)	1	2:00
2020-09-13	Loss	(Japan) Reito Asai	K-1 Amateur 33 - A-class Tournament, Semifinals	Tokyo, Japan	TKO (right cross)	1	
2020-09-13	Win	(Japan) Masaki Kakehashi	K-1 Amateur 33 - A-class Tournament, Quarterfinals	Tokyo, Japan	Decision (unanimous)	1	2:00
2020-08-02	Loss	(Japan) Yuto Kubo	K-1 Koshien 2020 Tournament, First Round	Tokyo, Japan	Decision (unanimous)	1	2:00
2020-03-15	Win	(Japan) Yuuhi Kimura	9th K-1 Amateur All Japan Tournament, Final	Tokyo, Japan	Decision (unanimous)	1	2:00
Wins 9th K-1 Amateur All Japan Tournament B-class -55kg title.
2020-03-15	Win	(Japan) Shota Katsube	9th K-1 Amateur All Japan Tournament, Semifinals	Tokyo, Japan	Decision (unanimous)	1	2:00
2020-03-15	Win	(Japan) Kohei Oikawa	9th K-1 Amateur All Japan Tournament, Quarterfinals	Tokyo, Japan	Decision (split)	1	2:00
2019-11-03	Loss	(Japan) Yuuhi Kimura	K-1 Amateur 30 - All Japan Tournament East Selection, Final	Tokyo, Japan	Decision (slit)	1	2:00
2019-11-03	Win	(Japan) Koya Oishi	K-1 Amateur 30 - All Japan Tournament East Selection, Semifinals	Tokyo, Japan	Decision (unanimous)	1	2:00
2019-11-03	Win	(Japan) Kotaro Suzuki	K-1 Amateur 30 - All Japan Tournament East Selection, Quarterfinals	Tokyo, Japan	Decision (unanimous)	1	2:00
2019-11-03	Win	(Japan) Anji Arami	K-1 Amateur 30 - All Japan Tournament East Selection, First Round	Tokyo, Japan	Decision (split)	1	2:00
2019-09-08	Win	(Japan) Daiki Tajima	8th K-1 Amateur All Japan Tournament, One Match	Tokyo, Japan	Decision (unanimous)	1	2:00
2019-08-04	Win	(Japan) Riki Omori	K-1 Amateur 29	Tokyo, Japan	Decision (split)	1	2:00
2019-06-09	Loss	(Japan) Yusuke Nagafuchi	K-1 Amateur 27	Tokyo, Japan	Decision (unanimous)	1	2:00
2019-05-15	Win	(Japan) Masaki Watanabe	K-1 Amateur 26	Tokyo, Japan	Decision (unanimous)	1	2:00
Legend: Win Loss Draw/No contest Notes
