= Koji Ikeda =

Japanese kickboxer (born 1997)

- Born: 池田幸司; June 30, 1997 (age 29); Takasaki, Gunma Prefecture, Japan
- Height: 170 cm (5 ft 7 in)
- Weight: 55 kg (121 lb; 8.7 st)
- Stance: Orthodox
- Fighting out of: Tokyo, Japan
- Team: ReBORN Kyodo
- Years active: 2019-present

Kickboxing record
- Total: 28
- Wins: 17
- By knockout: 9
- Losses: 11
- By knockout: 3

Koji Ikeda (Japanese: 池田幸司, Ikeda Koji; born June 30, 1997) is a Japanese professional kickboxer, currently competing in the bantamweight divisions of K-1 and Krush.

A professional competitor since 2019, Ikeda is the current Krush Bantamweight champion. As of April 2022, Combat Press ranks him as the eight best strawweight kickboxer in the world.

== Kickboxing career ==
=== Bantamweight ===
==== Early career ====
Ikeda made his professional debut against Kosuke at K-1 KRUSH FIGHT 106 on October 13, 2019. He won the fight by a first-round knockout. Ikeda faced Yuki Toyoda at K-1 World GP 2019 Japan: ～Women's Flyweight Championship Tournament～ on December 28, 2019, in his second professional bout. He won the fight by unanimous decision, with scores of 29–28, 29–28 and 30–28.

Ikeda was booked to face the 1-2 Mao Hashimoto at Krush 115 on July 21, 2020. He lost the fight by unanimous decision, with scores of 30–28, 30–28 and 29–28. After suffering the first loss of his professional career, Ikeda was scheduled to participate in the 2020 Krush bantamweight tournament. Ikeda faced Begin Yoshioka in the tournament quarterfinals, held at Krush 118 on October 17, 2020. He lost the fight by split decision.

Ikeda was booked to face Yuya Uzawa at Krush 120 on December 19, 2020. He won the fight by unanimous decision, with scores of 30–27, 30–27 and 30–28, successfully snapping his two-fight losing skid. Ikeda next faced Eiki Kurata at K-1: K'Festa 4 Day 1 on March 21, 2021. Kurata missed weight by 500 g at the official weigh-ins. He won the fight by a second-round knockout.

This two fight streak earned Ikeda a place in the 2021 K-1 Japan Bantamweight Tournament, which took place on May 29, 2021. He faced the eventual tournament winner Toma Kuroda in the quarterfinal bout, which he lost by a second round knockout. Ikeda was first knocked down with a counter left-straight at the end of the opening round, before suffering a flying knee knockdout 50 seconds into the next round.

Ikeda faced Daiki Mine at Krush 128 on August 21, 2021. He rebounded from his third professional loss with a unanimous decision win against Mine, with scores of 30–27, 30–26 and 30–26. He scored the sole knockdown of the fight in the first round, as he dropped Mine with a right straight. Ikeda next faced Kazuki Fujita at Krush 131 on November 20, 2021. He won the fight by a third-round technical knockout, stopping Fujita with right straights.

==== Krush bantamweight champion ====
His two-fight winning streak earned Ikeda the opportunity to challenge the reigning Krush Bantamweight champion Kazuki Miburo on March 26, 2022, in the main event of Krush 135. He won the fight by majority decision, with two judges awarding him a 30–29 scorecards, while the third judge scored the bout as an even 30–30 draw.

Ikeda made his first Krush title defense against the 2020 K-1 Koshien super bantamweight tournament winner Aoi Noda. The bout was scheduled as the main event of Krush 139, which took place on July 30, 2022. Ikeda retained the title by a first-round knockout. He knocked Noda down with a spinning backfist early in the second round and stopped him with a right straight soon after.

On October 14, it was announced that Ikeda would particulate in the 2022 K-1 Bantamweight World Grand Prix, which was scheduled to take place at K-1 World GP 2022 in Osaka on December 3, 2022. Ikeda faced the FCKBMT -57 kg champion Ambi Nsue Avomo in the quarterfinals of the one-day tournament. He stopped Avomo with a liver kick in the second round, after knocking him down with a right straight in the first round, and faced the multiple-time muay thai champion Issei Ishii in the semifinals. He lost the fight by unanimous decision, with scores of 30–29, 30–29 and 30–28.

Ikeda made his second Krush Bantamweight title defense against Kiri Matsutani at Krush 146 on February 25, 2023. He won the fight by a second-round knockout.

Ikeda faced the former Rajadamnern Stadium bantamweight champion Petchmongkol Soonkelahuaytom at K-1 World GP 2023 in Yokohama on June 3, 2023. He won the fight by a close split decision, after an extra fourth round was contested.

Ikeda faced KNOCK OUT Red Super Flyweight champion Shinta at K-1 World GP 2023: ReBOOT～K-1 ReBIRTH～ on September 10, 2023. He won the fight by knockout, flooring Shinta with a knee to the body at the very end of the second round.

Ikeda faced Musashi Matsushita at RISE WORLD SERIES 2023 Final Round on December 16, 2023. He won the fight by majority decision, with scores of 30–29, 29–28 and 29–29.

Ikeda faced Ryu Hanaoka in a cross-promotional bout at RISE ELDORADO 2024 on March 17, 2024. He lost the fight by unanimous decision.

=== Super bantamweight ===
Ikeda faced Koki at K-1 World MAX 2024 - World Championship Tournament Final on July 7, 2024. He won the fight by a second-round knockout.

Ikeda faced Lyra Nagasaka in the reserve bout of the 2024 K-1 super bantamweight tournament at K-1 World MAX 2024 on September 29, 2024. He lost the fight by a first-round technical knockout.

Ikeda challenged Riamu for the Krush Super Bantamweight (-55kg) title at Krush 172 on March 30, 2025. He lost the fight by unanimous decision, after an extra fourth round was contested.

Ikeda faced the reigning K-1 super bantamweight champion Akihiro Kaneko in a non-title catchweight bout at K-1 Beyond on May 31, 2025. He won the fight by majority decision. The pair faced each other in an immediate rematch, with the bantamweight title on the line, at K-1 World MAX 2025 - World Tournament Opening Round on September 7, 2025. He lost the fight by unanimous decision, with two scorecards of 29—27 and one scorecard of 29—26 in Kaneko's favor.

Ikeda faced Toki Oshika at K-1 World MAX 2025 - 70kg World Championship Tournament Final on November 15, 2025. He lost the fight by unanimous decision, with all three judges scoring the bout 30—29 for Oshika.

Ikeda faced Futa Hashimoto at K-1 World GP 2026 - 90kg World Tournament on February 8, 2026. He lost the fight by majority decision, with scores of 30—29, 30—29 and 29—29.

== Championships and accomplishments ==
Amateur

- K-1
  - 2019 K-1 College Tournament Winner (-55 kg)
- World Muay Thai Council
  - 2018 WMC Japan Amateur -54 kg Champion

Professional

- Krush
  - 2022 Krush Bantamweight Championship
    - Two successful title defenses
  - 2022 Krush Fight of the Year (vs. Aoi Noda)

Awards

- Beyond Kickboxing
  - Beyond Kickboxing's 2025 Upset of the Year (vs. Akihiro Kaneko)

== Kickboxing record ==
Kickboxing record
17 wins (9 (T)KOs), 10 losses, 0 draws
Date	Result	Opponent	Event	Location	Method	Round	Time
2026-11-23		(Japan) Eito Kurokawa	K-1 Revenge II	Tokyo, Japan			
2026-09-12	Loss	(Japan) Kenshin Tanabe	K-1 World MAX 2026 - World Tournament Opening Round	Tokyo, Japan	KO (left cross)	2	2:15
2026-05-31	Win	(Japan) Kazuki Fujita	K-1 Revenge	Tokyo, Japan	KO (knee to the body)	1	0:58
2026-02-08	Loss	(Japan) Futa Hashimoto	K-1 World GP 2026 - 90kg World Tournament	Tokyo, Japan	Decision (majority)	3	3:00
2025-11-15	Loss	(Japan) Toki Oshika	K-1 World MAX 2025 - 70kg World Championship Tournament Final	Tokyo, Japan	Decision (unanimous)	3	3:00
2025-09-07	Loss	(Japan) Akihiro Kaneko	K-1 World MAX 2025 - World Tournament Opening Round	Tokyo, Japan	Decision (unanimous)	3	3:00
For the K-1 Super Bantamweight Championship.
2025-05-31	Win	(Japan) Akihiro Kaneko	K-1 Beyond	Yokohama, Japan	Decision (majority)	3	3:00
2025-03-30	Loss	(Japan) Riamu	Krush 172	Tokyo, Japan	Ext.R decision (unanimous)	4	3:00
For the Krush Super Bantamweight (-55kg) title.
2024-12-14	Win	(Japan) Momotaro Kiyama	K-1 World Grand Prix 2024 Final	Tokyo, Japan	Decision (unanimous)	3	3:00
2024-09-29	Loss	(Japan) Lyra Nagasaka	K-1 World MAX 2024 - 55 kg Tournament Reserve Fight	Tokyo, Japan	TKO (2 knockdowns)	1	2:31
2024-07-07	Win	(Japan) Koki	K-1 World MAX 2024 - World Championship Tournament Final	Tokyo, Japan	TKO (punches)	2	2:05
2024-03-17	Loss	(Japan) Ryu Hanaoka	RISE ELDORADO 2024	Tokyo, Japan	Decision (unanimous)	3	3:00
2023-12-16	Win	(Japan) Musashi Matsushita	RISE World Series 2023 - Final Round	Tokyo, Japan	Decision (majority)	3	3:00
2023-09-10	Win	(Japan) Shinta	K-1 World GP 2023: ReBOOT～K-1 ReBIRTH～	Yokohama, Japan	KO (knee to the body)	2	2:43
2023-06-03	Win	(Thailand) Petchmongkol Soonkelahuaytom	K-1 World GP 2023: inaugural Middleweight Championship Tournament	Yokohama, Japan	Ext.R decision (split)	4	3:00
2023-02-25	Win	(Japan) Kiri Matsutani	Krush 146	Tokyo, Japan	KO (left hook)	2	1:08
Defends the Krush Bantamweight Championship.
2022-12-03	Loss	(Japan) Issei Ishii	K-1 World GP 2022 in Osaka Bantamweight World Grand Prix, Semi Final	Osaka, Japan	Decision (unanimous)	3	3:00
2022-12-03	Win	(Equatorial Guinea) Ambi Nsue Avomo	K-1 World GP 2022 in Osaka Bantamweight World Grand Prix, Quarter Final	Osaka, Japan	KO (liver kick)	2	1:15
2022-07-30	Win	(Japan) Aoi Noda	Krush 139	Tokyo, Japan	KO (right cross)	2	0:57
Defends the Krush Bantamweight Championship.
2022-03-26	Win	(Japan) Kazuki Miburo	Krush 135	Tokyo, Japan	Decision (majority)	3	3:00
Won the Krush Bantamweight Championship.
2021-11-20	Win	(Japan) Kazuki Fujita	Krush 131	Tokyo, Japan	TKO (right straights)	3	2:17
2021-08-21	Win	(Japan) Daiki Mine	Krush 128	Tokyo, Japan	Decision (unanimous)	3	3:00
2021-05-29	Loss	(Japan) Toma Kuroda	K-1 World GP 2021: Japan Bantamweight Tournament, Quarter Final	Tokyo, Japan	KO (flying knee)	2	2:10
2021-03-21	Win	(Japan) Eiki Kurata	K'Festa 4 Day 1	Tokyo, Japan	KO (right straight)	2	1:55
2020-12-19	Win	(Japan) Yuya Uzawa	Krush 120	Tokyo, Japan	Decision (unanimous)	3	3:00
2020-10-17	Loss	(Japan) Begin Yoshioka	Krush 118	Tokyo, Japan	Decision (split)	3	3:00
2020-07-21	Loss	(Japan) Mao Hashimoto	Krush 115	Tokyo, Japan	Decision (unanimous)	3	3:00
2019-12-28	Win	(Japan) Yuki Toyoda	K-1 World GP 2019 Japan: ～Women's Flyweight Championship Tournament～	Nagoya, Japan	Decision (unanimous)	3	3:00
2019-10-13	Win	(Japan) Kosuke	K-1 KRUSH FIGHT 106	Tokyo, Japan	KO (left straight)	1	1:18
Legend: Win Loss Draw/no contest Notes

Amateur kickboxing record
Date	Result	Opponent	Event	Location	Method	Round	Time
2019-08-04	Win	(Japan) Daito Arima	K-1 2019 College Tournament, Finals	Tokyo, Japan	Decision (unanimous)	1	3:00
Won the 2019 K-1 Amateur College Tournament title.
2019-08-04	Win	(Japan) Gentaro Iwamoto	K-1 2019 College Tournament, Semifinals	Tokyo, Japan	TKO (right cross)	1	1:10
2019-08-04	Win	(Japan) Masaru Ito	K-1 2019 College Tournament, Quarterfinals	Tokyo, Japan	Decision (split)	1	2:00
2018-12-16	Win	(Japan) Rinta Gyoda	WMC Japan Amateur 4	Yokohama, Japan	KO		
Won the WMC Japan Amateur -54kg title.
2018-12-02	Win	(Japan) Raito Tamagawa	7th K-1 Amateur All Japan, One match	Tokyo, Japan	Decision (split)	1	3:00
2018-10-14	Win	(Japan) Koya Kinoshita	WMC Japan Amateur 3, Final	Tokyo, Japan	Decision	2	2:00
2018-10-14	Win	(Japan) Yudai Takahashi	WMC Japan Amateur 3, Semi Final	Tokyo, Japan	Decision	2	2:00
2018-07-01	Win	(Japan) Yuhei Uematsu	WMC Japan Amateur 2	Yokohama, Japan	Decision	2	2:00
Legend: Win Loss Draw/no contest Notes

== See also ==
- List of male kickboxers
- List of Krush champions
