= Toma Kuroda =

Japanese kickboxer

- Born: 黒田 斗真; December 31, 2000 (age 25); Yao, Osaka, Japan
- Height: 165 cm (5 ft 5 in)
- Weight: 53 kg (117 lb; 8.3 st)
- Division: Flyweight
- Style: Shorinji Kempo, Kickboxing
- Stance: Southpaw
- Fighting out of: Osaka, Japan
- Team: Forward Gym (2025-Present); K-1 Gym Shinsaibashi Team Leopard (2020-2024); Ryukenjuku (2009-2019)
- Years active: 2017 - present

Kickboxing record
- Total: 23
- Wins: 16
- By knockout: 5
- Losses: 6
- By knockout: 0
- Draws: 1

Toma Kuroda (Japanese: 黒田 斗真, Kuroda Toma; born December 31, 2000) is a Japanese kickboxer. He is a former K-1 Bantamweight champion. He is also the 2021 K-1 Japan Bantamweight Grand Prix and 2022 K-1 World Bantamweight Grand Prix winner.

Combat Press ranks him as the No. 5 strawweight in the world, as of August 2021. Between June and July 2021, he was ranked as the No. 7 Flyweight kickboxer in the world.

== Kickboxing career ==
=== K-1 ===
==== Early career ====
Kuroda made his professional debut against Yuta Kuwata at KHAOS 4. Kuroda won the fight by a first-round technical knockout. Kuroda was scheduled to fight KING Tsubasa at DEEP KICK 38, fifteen months after his first fight. He won the fight by majority decision.

Kuroda was scheduled to fight Aoi Noda at the K-1 World GP 2019 Japan vs World: 5 vs 5 & Special Superfight in Osaka event. The fight ended in a majority draw, with two of the judges scoring the fight a 29–29 draw, while the third judge scored the fight 30–29 in Kuroda's favor. The two of them were scheduled to fight a rematch at Krush 108, which Kuroda won by a 43-second knockout. Kuroda suffered his first professional loss at Krush 115, as he lost an extra round decision to Koki.

==== 2020 Krush Bantamweight Tournament ====
Kuroda was scheduled to participate in the 2020 Krush Bantamweight tournament, organized to crown the Krush Bantamweight champion. The title was previously held by Junki Sasaki, who vacated the belt after moving up to super bantamweight. Kuroda was scheduled to fight Kazuma Takuda in the quarterfinalsm at Krush 118. Takuda spent the majority of fight focusing on his kicks, while Kuroda more consistently combined his kicks and punches. Kuroda won the quarterfinal bout by unanimous decision, with scores of 30–29, 30-29 and 30–28. Advancing to the semifinals, Kuroda was scheduled to fight the tournament favorite Begin Yoshioka, at Krush 120. Kuroda lost the fight by unanimous decision, with scores of 30–28, 30-28 and 29–28. Yoshioka would go on to win the tournament.

==== K-1 Bantamweight Grand Prix ====
Kuroda was scheduled to take part in the 2021 K-1 Japan Grand Prix. He was scheduled to fight Koji Ikeda in the tournament quarterfinals. During a pre-fight interview, Kuroda stated his desire to face the reigning Krush Bantamweight champion Kazuki Miburo in the finals. Miburo was scheduled to compete in the opposite side of the bracket. Kuroda managed to knock Ikeda down at the very end of the first round, after landing a counter left-straight to Ikeda's front kick. Ikeda came out attempting to pressure in the second round, but was knocked out with a flying knee 50 second into the round. Advancing to the semifinals, Kuroda faced Hinata Matsumoto. Although he wasn't able to knock Matsumoto out, Kuroda scored a knockdown in both the first and second round. He won the fight by unanimous decision, with scores of 30–25, 30-26 and 30–26. In the tournament finals, Kuroda fought the Krush Bantamweight champion Kazuki Miburo. He made quick work of the champion, knocking him out with a left cross, after just 31 seconds.

Kuroda was scheduled to fight a rematch with Kazuki Miburo at K-1 World GP 2021 Japan on December 4, 2021. The pair fought five months prior, in the finals of the K-1 Japan Bantamweight Tournament, with Kuroda winning by knockout. Kuroda was once again victorious, as he won the fight by unanimous decision, after an extra round was fought. Kuroda next faced the 2021 Dead or Alive Bantamweight Tournament winner Kazane Nagai at The Match 2022, the K-1 and RISE cross-promotional event, on June 19, 2022. He lost the fight by unanimous decision, after an extra fourth round was fought, as the bout was ruled a split decision draw following the first three rounds.

On October 14, it was revealed that Kuroda was one of eight participants in the 2022 K-1 Bantamweight World Grand Prix. He was booked to face the Yodsila Chor.Hapayak in the quarterfinals of the one-day tournament, which was held at K-1 World GP 2022 in Osaka on December 3, 2022. The fight was ruled a split decision draw after the first three rounds, with scores of 30–29, 29–30 and 30–30. Kuroda was awarded the unanimous decision following the extra fourth round and faced the former Krush Bantamweight champion Kazuki Miburo in the semifinals of the one-day tournament. He won the fight by majority decision, with two judges scoring the bout 30–28 and 30–29 in his favor, while the third judge scored it 30–30. Kuroda advanced to the tournament final, where he faced Issei Ishii for the inaugural K-1 Bantamweight (-53 kg) title. He won the fight by split decision, after an extension round was contested. In the post-fight press conference, Kuroda revealed that he suffered an arm injury the quarterfinal bout.

==== Title reign ====
Kuroda faced the IFMA World Junior Championships winner Ramadan Ondash in a non-title bout at K-1 World GP 2023 in Yokohama on June 3, 2023. He won the fight by unanimous decision, with all three judges awarding him a 30–29 scorecard.

Kuroda made his first K-1 Bantamweight title defense against Issei Ishii at K-1 ReBIRTH 2 on December 9, 2023. He retained the title by unanimous decision.

On April 14, 2025, it was announced that Kuroda would face Siwarat Wor.Ritnada at Space ONE Japan x BOM on May 11 of the same year, following a 17 month absence from the sport. According to Kuroda and K-1 producer Mitsuru Miyata, the fighter was still under contract with K-1, despite no longer training at a K-1 affiliated gym and despite him singing on to fight for a different promotion. On May 9, 2025, K-1 announced that Kuroda's contract was terminated.

==== Post K-1 ====
Kuroda defeated Siwarat Wor.Ritnada at Space ONE Japan x BOM by first round knockout on May 11, 2025.

Kuroda made his ONE Championship debut against Adam Sor.Dechapan at ONE Friday Fights 126 on September 26, 2025.

== Titles and accomplishments ==
=== Professional ===
- K-1
  - 2021 K-1 Bantamweight Japan Grand Prix Winner
  - 2022 K-1 Bantamweight World Grand Prix Winner
  - 2022 K-1 Bantamweight Championship
    - One successful title defense

Awards

- eFight.jp
  - Fighter of the Month (December 2022)

=== Amateur ===
- DEEP KICK
  - 2011 TOP RUN Junior -30 kg Champion
- All Japan Glove Karate Federation
  - 2012 All Japan Glove Karate Federation Elementary School Champion

== Kickboxing record ==
Kickboxing record
16 Wins (5 (T)KO's), 6 Losses, 1 Draw, 0 No Contest
Date	Result	Opponent	Event	Location	Method	Round	Time
2026-04-29	Loss	(Japan) Toki Tamaru	ONE Samurai 1	Tokyo, Japan	Decision (Unanimous)	3	3:00
2026-04-05	Win	(Japan) Shuto Sato	BOM 50	Yokohama, Japan	Tech. Decision (Unanimous)	2	1:04
2026-03-06	Loss	(Thailand) Banluelok Sitwatcharachai	ONE Friday Fights 145, Lumpinee Stadium	Bangkok, Thailand	Decision (Unanimous)	3	3:00
2025-11-14	Win	(Russia) Kirill Chizhik	ONE Friday Fights 133, Lumpinee Stadium	Bangkok, Thailand	Decision (Unanimous)	3	3:00
2025-09-26	Loss	(Malaysia) Adam Sor.Dechapan	ONE Friday Fights 126, Lumpinee Stadium	Bangkok, Thailand	Decision (Unanimous)	3	3:00
2025-05-11	Win	(Thailand) Siwarat Wor.Ritnada	Space ONE Japan x BOM	Tokyo, Japan	KO (Knee to the body)	1	0:55
2023-12-09	Win	(Japan) Issei Ishii	K-1 ReBIRTH 2	Osaka, Japan	Decision (Unanimous)	3	3:00
Defends the K-1 Bantamweight title.
2023-06-03	Win	(Lebanon) Ramadan Ondash	K-1 World GP 2023: inaugural Middleweight Championship Tournament	Yokohama, Japan	Decision (Unanimous)	3	3:00
2022-12-03	Win	(Japan) Issei Ishii	K-1 World GP 2022 in Osaka Bantamweight World Grand Prix, Final	Osaka, Japan	Ext.R Decision (Split)	4	3:00
Wins the 2022 K-1 Bantamweight World Grand Prix and the inaugural K-1 Bantamweight title.
2022-12-03	Win	(Japan) Kazuki Miburo	K-1 World GP 2022 in Osaka Bantamweight World Grand Prix, Semi Final	Osaka, Japan	Decision (Majority)	3	3:00
2022-12-03	Win	(Thailand) Yodsila Chor.Hapayak	K-1 World GP 2022 in Osaka Bantamweight World Grand Prix, Quarter Final	Osaka, Japan	Ext.R Decision (Unanimous)	4	3:00
2022-06-19	Loss	(Japan) Kazane	THE MATCH 2022	Tokyo, Japan	Ext.R Decision (Unanimous)	4	3:00
2021-12-04	Win	(Japan) Kazuki Miburo	K-1 World GP 2021 in Osaka	Osaka, Japan	Ext.R Decision (Unanimous)	4	3:00
2021-05-30	Win	(Japan) Kazuki Miburo	K-1 World GP 2021: Japan Bantamweight Tournament, Final	Tokyo, Japan	KO (Left Cross)	1	0:31
Wins K-1 Japan Bantamweight Tournament.
2021-05-30	Win	(Japan) Hinata Matsumoto	K-1 World GP 2021: Japan Bantamweight Tournament, Semi Final	Tokyo, Japan	Decision (Unanimous)	3	3:00
2021-05-30	Win	(Japan) Koji Ikeda	K-1 World GP 2021: Japan Bantamweight Tournament, Quarter Final	Tokyo, Japan	KO (Flying Knee)	2	2:10
2020-12-19	Loss	(Japan) Begin Yoshioka	Krush.120 - Bantamweight Championship Tournament Semi Final	Tokyo, Japan	Decision (Unanimous)	3	3:00
2020-10-17	Win	(Japan) Kazuma Takuda	Krush.118 - Bantamweight Championship Tournament Quarter Final	Tokyo, Japan	Decision (Unanimous)	3	3:00
2020-06-28	Loss	(Japan) Koki	Krush 115	Tokyo, Japan	Ext.R Decision (Unanimous)	4	3:00
2019-11-16	Win	(Japan) Aoi Noda	Krush.108	Osaka, Japan	TKO	1	0:43
2019-08-24	Draw	(Japan) Aoi Noda	K-1 World GP 2019 Japan vs World・5 vs 5 & Special Superfight in Osaka	Osaka, Japan	Decision	3	3:00
2019-01-06	Win	(Japan) KING Tsubasa	DEEP KICK 38	Osaka, Japan	Decision (Majority)	3	3:00
2017-10-14	Win	(Japan) Yuta Kuwata	KHAOS 4	Tokyo, Japan	TKO (Doctor Stoppage)	1	2:12
Legend: Win Loss Draw/No contest Notes

=== Amateur record ===
Amateur Kickboxing Record
Date	Result	Opponent	Event	Location	Method	Round	Time
2018-07-29	Loss	(Japan) Raito Tamagawa	K-1 Koshien Tournament, Quarter Final	Tokyo, Japan	KO	1	
2018-07-29	Win	(Japan) Yuki Maeda	K-1 Koshien Tournament, Second Round	Tokyo, Japan	Decision (Split)	1	2:00
2018-07-29	Win	(Japan) Tatsuya Yoshida	K-1 Koshien Tournament, First Round	Tokyo, Japan	Decision (Unanimous)	1	2:00
2017-05-28	Win	(Japan) Yu Kinosada	NEXT LEVEL Kansai 39	Sakai, Japan	KO	1	0:44
2013-05-12	Loss	(Japan) Takasuke Sekimoto	DEEP☆KICK 15	Osaka, Japan	Decision (Unanimous)	3	2:00
2013-04-14	Win	(Japan) Koya Sugiura	NEXT LEVEL Kansai 6	Sakai, Japan	Decision (Unanimous)		
2013-01-27	Win	(Japan) Shogo Tanaka	NEXT LEVEL Kansai 4	Sakai, Japan	Decision (Unanimous)		
2012-12-16	Loss	(Japan) Shinya Hirota	NEXT LEVEL Kansai 3	Osaka, Japan	Decision (Unanimous)		
2012-09-23	Loss	(Japan) Takasuke Sekimoto	NEXT LEVEL Kansai 1 - Challenger Tournament, Final	Sakai, Japan	Decision (Majority)		
2012-09-23	Win	(Japan) Aoshi Kitano	NEXT LEVEL Kansai 1 - Challenger Tournament, Semi Final	Sakai, Japan	Decision (Unanimous)		
2012-07-16	Draw	(Japan) Haruki Ohno	NEXT LEVEL	Sakai, Japan	Decision		
2012-05-06	Loss	(Japan) Katsuya Aoki	NEXT LEVEL	Higashiosaka, Japan	TKO	1	
2012-05-06	Win	(Japan) Taito Suzuki	NEXT LEVEL	Higashiosaka, Japan	Decision (Unanimous)		
2012-03-25	Loss	(Japan) Daiki Fujimoto	NEXT LEVEL	Habikino, Osaka, Japan	Decision (Majority)		
2011-10-	Win	(Japan) Kenshin Yurai	AROUND 4 - Prince Tournament, Final	Japan	Decision (Unanimous)		
2011-10-	Win	(Japan) Shota Hirogaki	AROUND 4 - Prince Tournament, Semi Final	Japan	Decision (Unanimous)		
2011-10-	Win	(Japan) Shuta Miyamoto	AROUND 4 - Prince Tournament, Quarter Final	Japan	Decision (Unanimous)		
2011-10-23	Win	(Japan) Raimu Minato	DEEP KICK 8 - TOP RUN 2	Osaka, Japan	Decision (Majority)	3	2:00
Wins TOP RUN Junior -30kg title.
2011-04-10	Loss	(Japan) Ryo Mandokoro	DEEP KICK 6 - TOP RUN 1	Osaka, Japan	Decision (Unanimous)	2	2:00
For the TOP RUN Junior -30kg title.
Legend: Win Loss Draw/No contest Notes

== See also ==
- List of male kickboxers
