= Kazuki Miburo =

Japanese male kickboxer

- Born: Kazuki Matsumot; 28 September 2001 (age 25); Kaho, Fukuoka, Japan
- Other names: ミブロ カズキ
- Height: 1.64 m (5 ft 4 1/2 in)
- Weight: 53 kg (117 lb; 8 st 5 lb)
- Style: Kickboxing
- Fighting out of: Shizuoka, Japan
- Team: Riki Dojo Shizuoka
- Years active: 2017 - present

Kickboxing record
- Total: 24
- Wins: 18
- By knockout: 5
- Losses: 6
- By knockout: 1

Kazuki Matsumoto (Japanese: 松本 一輝, Matsumoto Kazuki), also known as Kazuki Miburo (壬生狼 一輝, born 28 September 2001) is a Japanese kickboxer. He is the former Krush Bantamweight champion.

Combat Press ranks him as the #6 strawweight in the world, as of August 2021. Between April and July 2021, he was ranked as the #9 Flyweight kickboxer in the world.

== Kickboxing career ==
=== Early career ===
Miburo fought Eiki Kurata at Krush-EX 2020 vol.1, as a short notice replacement for Rikiya Suzuki, who was forced to withdraw due to a training injury. Miburo won the fight by unanimous decision.

Miburo was scheduled to make his K-1 debut at K-1 World GP 2020 in Fukuoka, being scheduled to fight Koki Tomimura. He won the fight by a split decision.

Miburo was scheduled to fight Hinata Matsumoto at Krush 121. He won the fight by majority decision.

=== Krush bantamweight champion ===
He was scheduled to fight Begin Yoshioka at Krush 123, for the Krush Bantamweight title. Miburo won the fight by a majority decision.

Miburo was scheduled to take part in the K-1's eight-man Japan Bantamweight Grand Prix. He would face Aoi Noda in the quarterfinal bout. He would overcome Aoi Noda in the quarterfinals and Naoki Omura in the semifinals by decision, before losing to Toma Kuroda by knockout in the finals.

Miburo was scheduled to face Toma Kuroda at K-1 World GP 2021 Japan on December 4, 2021. They fought just five months prior, in the finals of the K-1 Japan Bantamweight Tournament, which Miburo lost by a first-round knockout. Miburo lost the fight by unanimous decision, after an extra round was fought.

Miburo was booked to make his first Krush bantamweight title defense against Koji Ikeda at Krush 135 on March 26, 2022. He lost the fight by majority decision.

=== Later bantamweight career ===
Miburo faced Daiki Mine at K-1 World GP 2022 in Fukuoka on August 11, 2022. He successfully snapped his three-fight losing strea, as he won the fight by unanimous decision, with all three judges awarding him a 30–29 scorecard.

Miburo took part in the 2022 K-1 Bantamweight World Grand Prix, which was held at K-1 World GP 2022 in Osaka on December 3, 2022. He was booked to face the three-sport World Kickboxing Network champion Samvel Babayan in the quarterfinals of the one-day tournament. Miburo won the fight by unanimous decision, with two scorecards of 30–29 and one scorecard of 30–28. He advanced to the tournament semifinals, where he faced the 2021 K-1 Japan Grand Prix winner Toma Kuroda. He lost the fight by majority decision, with scores of 30–30, 30–29 and 30–28.

Miburo faced Yusei Shirahata at K-1 World GP 2023 in Yokohama on June 3, 2023. He won the fight by unanimous decision, with two scorecards of 29–28 and one scorecard of 30–28.

Miburo faced Park Hyungwoo at Krush 152 on August 27, 2023. Miburo won the fight by a first-round knockout.

Miburo faced Shinta at Krush 155 on November 25, 2023. He won the fight by a second-round knockout.

Miburo faced Rui Okubo at K-1 World MAX 2024 - World Tournament Opening Round on March 20, 2024. He lost the fight by unanimous decision.

== Championships and accomplishments ==
Amateur

- 2013 All Japan Jr. Kick -30 kg Runner-up
- 2014 TRIBELATE -35 kg Champion

Professional

- Yamato
  - 2019 Yamato Bantamweight Champion
- Krush
  - 2021 Krush Bantamweight (-53 kg) Champion
- K-1
  - 2021 K-1 World GP Japan Bantamweight Tournament Runner-up

== Fight record ==
Professional Kickboxing Record
18 Wins (5 (T)KOs), 6 Losses, 0 Draw, 0 No Contest
Date	Result	Opponent	Event	Location	Method	Round	Time
2026-10-25	Loss	(Japan) Ryuki Matsuda	GOAT Kickboxing Fes. 3	Tokyo, Japan	Decision (Unanimous)	3	3:00
2026-08-08	Win	(Japan) Shinta Kojima	KNOCK OUT.67	Osaka, Japan	KO (punches)	1	2:37
2024-03-20	Loss	(Japan) Rui Okubo	K-1 World MAX 2024 - World Tournament Opening Round	Tokyo, Japan	Decision (unanimous)	3	3:00
2023-11-25	Win	(Japan) Shinta	Krush 155	Tokyo, Japan	KO (right cross)	2	0:54
2023-08-27	Win	(South Korea) Park Hyungwoo	Krush 152	Tokyo, Japan	KO (left hook to the body)	1	2:58
2023-06-03	Win	(Japan) Yusei Shirahata	K-1 World GP 2023: inaugural Middleweight Championship Tournament	Yokohama, Japan	Decision (unanimous)	3	3:00
2022-12-03	Loss	(Japan) Toma Kuroda	K-1 World GP 2022 in Osaka Bantamweight World Grand Prix, Semi Final	Osaka, Japan	Decision (majority)	3	3:00
2022-12-03	Win	(Armenia) Samvel Babayan	K-1 World GP 2022 in Osaka Bantamweight World Grand Prix, Quarter Final	Osaka, Japan	Decision (unanimous)	3	3:00
2022-08-11	Win	(Japan) Daiki Mine	K-1 World GP 2022 in Fukuoka	Fukuoka, Japan	Decision (unanimous)	3	3:00
2022-03-26	Loss	(Japan) Koji Ikeda	Krush 135	Tokyo, Japan	Decision (majority)	3	3:00
Loses the Krush Bantamweight -53kg title.
2021-12-04	Loss	(Japan) Toma Kuroda	K-1 World GP 2021 in Osaka	Osaka, Japan	Ext.R Decision (unanimous)	4	3:00
2021-05-30	Loss	(Japan) Toma Kuroda	K-1 World GP 2021: Japan Bantamweight Tournament, Final	Tokyo, Japan	KO (left cross)	1	0:31
2021-05-30	Win	(Japan) Naoki Omura	K-1 World GP 2021: Japan Bantamweight Tournament, Semi Final	Tokyo, Japan	Ext.R Decision (unanimous)	4	3:00
2021-05-30	Win	(Japan) Aoi Noda	K-1 World GP 2021: Japan Bantamweight Tournament, Quarter Final	Tokyo, Japan	Decision (split)	3	3:00
2021-03-27	Win	(Japan) Begin Yoshioka	Krush 123	Tokyo, Japan	Decision (majority)	3	3:00
Wins Krush Bantamweight -53kg title. Yoshioka missed weight by 1.3kg. He had to wear 10oz gloves and was deducted 2 points.
2021-01-23	Win	(Japan) Hinata Matsumoto	Krush 121	Tokyo, Japan	Decision (majority)	3	3:00
2020-11-02	Win	(Japan) Koki	K-1 World GP 2020 in Fukuoka	Fukuoka, Japan	Decision (split)	3	3:00
2020-08-22	Win	(Japan) Eiki Kurata	Krush-EX 2020 vol.1	Tokyo, Japan	Decision (unanimous)	3	3:00
2019-11-17	Win	(Japan) Hiruto Nozaki	Yamato 18	Aka, Fukuoka	Decision	3	3:00
Wins the Yamato -53kg title.
2019-04-21	Win	(Korea) Shin Hee Chan	Yamato 17	Aka, Fukuoka			
2018-11-25	Win	(Japan) Shohei Nishibayashi	Yamato 15	Aka, Fukuoka	Decision	3	3:00
2018-04-15	Win	(Japan) Naofumi Taguchi	Yamato 14	Aka, Fukuoka	Decision	3	3:00
2017-11-19	Win	(Japan) Hiruto Nozaki	Yamato 13	Aka, Fukuoka			
Legend: Win Loss Draw/No contest Notes

=== Amateur record ===
Amateur Kickboxing record
Date	Result	Opponent	Event	Location	Method	Round	Time
2018-07-29	Loss	(Japan) Aoi Noda	K-1 Koshien 2018 –55 kg Tournament, Second Round	Tokyo, Japan	Decision (Split)	1	2:00
2018-07-29	Win	(Japan) Tsubasa Yamawaki	K-1 Koshien 2018, -55 kg Tournament First Round	Tokyo, Japan	Decision (Split)	1	2:00
2017-07-16	Win	(Japan) Futa Inumaru	Peter Aerts Spirit All Japan Kyushu Selection	Fukuoka, Japan	Decision (Unanimous)	2	2:00
2015-09-13	Loss	(Thailand) Kem Kiatkanpong	Suk Wan Kingtong	Thailand	TKO (Knee)	2	
2014-12-21	Loss	(Japan) Asahi Shinagawa	WINDY SPORTS	Tokyo, Japan	Decision	5	
For the WINDY SPORTS -40kg title.
2013-03-31	Loss	(Japan) Arato Iyama	3rd All Japan Jr. Kick -30 kg Tournament Final	Tokyo, Japan	Decision	3	2:00
For the All Japan Jr Kick -30kg title.
2013-03-31	Win	(Japan) Reito Komiyama	3rd All Japan Jr. Kick -30 kg Tournament Semi Final	Tokyo, Japan	Decision	2	2:00
2013-03-31	Win	(Japan)	3rd All Japan Jr. Kick -30 kg Tournament Quarter Final	Tokyo, Japan	Decision	2	2:00
2013-02-10	Loss	(Japan) Takito Tamaru	All Japan Jr. Kick Kyushu Selection Tournament -30 kg Final	Fukuoka, Japan	Decision	3	2:00
2013-02-10	Win	(Japan) Shoma Ideguchi	All Japan Jr. Kick Kyushu Selection Tournament -30 kg Semi Final	Fukuoka, Japan	Decision	2	2:00
2013-02-10	Win	(Japan) Yuto Ideguchi	All Japan Jr. Kick Kyushu Selection Tournament -30 kg Semi Final	Fukuoka, Japan	Decision	2	2:00
Legend: Win Loss Draw/No contest Notes

== See also ==
- List of male kickboxers
