= Koki Tomimura =

Japanese kickboxer

Koki
- Born: Koki Tomimura 富村晃貴; March 27, 1998 (age 28); Tottori Prefecture, Japan
- Height: 160 cm (5 ft 3 in)
- Weight: 55.0 kg (121.3 lb; 8.66 st)
- Division: Flyweight
- Style: Kickboxing
- Stance: Orthodox
- Fighting out of: Tokyo, Japan
- Team: Team Vasileus (2025 - Present); K-1 Gym Sagami Ono KREST (2016 - 2025)
- Years active: 2015 - present

Kickboxing record
- Total: 30
- Wins: 19
- By knockout: 7
- Losses: 10
- By knockout: 5
- No contests: 1

Koki (晃貴) is a Japanese kickboxer, currently signed with K-1, where he is the former Krush Bantamweight champion.

== Kickboxing career ==
Koki made his professional debut against Shun in September 2015, winning the fight by knockout. He would win his next fight against Tsubasa Hirano as well, by unanimous decision. He suffered his first loss at Krush 72, losing to Akihiro Kaneko by a third-round knockout.

He rebounded with a first round TKO of Reiji Kasami at Khaos 2, This victory was followed by losses to Aoshi and Junya Weerasakreck, as well as a draw with Naoya Otada.

After this bad run of form, Koki won his next three fights against Yuta Kuwata, Taisuke Degai and Shuto Hagiwara, all by decision. He was then scheduled to fight a rematch with Junya Weerasakreck for the Krush Bantamweight title. Koki won the fight by unanimous decision. For his first title defense, Koki faced Junki Sasaki. Sasaki won the fight by unanimous decision.

In his first fight, post title reign, Koki was scheduled to fight Begin Yoshioka. Yoshioka won the fight by unanimous decision. He won his next fight against Toma Kuroda by an extra round decision, before losing to Kazuki Miburo by split decision.

Koki was scheduled to fight a rematch with Akihiro Kaneko at K-1 World GP 2021: Yokohamatsuri on September 20, 2021. He lost the fight by a first-round technical knockout.

Koki was booked to face Takaya Ogura at Krush 135 on March 26, 2022. He won the fight by majority decision, with scores of 28–27, 28–28 and 28–27.

Koki faced Chikara Iwao at K-1 World GP 2023 on July 17, 2023.

On December 8, 2024, Koki faced Toki Oshika at Krush 169. He won the fight by majority decision.

== Titles and accomplishments ==
- Krush
  - 2019 Krush Bantamweight (-53 kg) Champion
- Bigbang
  - 2025 Bigbang Super Bantamweight (-55 kg) Champion
    - Two successful title defenses
- KNOCK OUT
  - 2026 KNOCK OUT Black Super Bantamweight (-55kg) Champion

== Professional kickboxing record ==
Professional Kickboxing Record
19 Wins (7 (T)KO's), 10 Losses, 0 Draw, 1 No Contest
Date	Result	Opponent	Event	Location	Method	Round	Time
2026-11-03	Win	(Japan) Ranmaru	Super Bigbang 2026	Yokohama, Japan	Decision (Unanimous)	3	3:00
Defends the Bigbang Super Bantamweight (-55kg) title.
2026-06-21	Win	(Japan) Yuki Morioka	KNOCK OUT.65 ～THE KNOCK OUT 2026～	Tokyo, Japan	Decision (Unanimous)	3	3:00
For the KNOCK OUT Black Super Bantamweight (-55kg) title.
2026-03-14	Win	(Japan) Yuki Morioka	KNOCK OUT.62	Tokyo, Japan	KO (Right hook)	1	1:55
2025-12-21	Win	(Thailand) Sanchai TeppenGym	Bigbang 54	Tokyo, Japan	KO (Left hook)	2	2:50
Defends the Bigbang Super Bantamweight (-55kg) title.
2025-06-01	Win	(Japan) Rasta	Bigbang 52	Tokyo, Japan	Decision (Majority)	3	3:00
Wins the Bigbang Super Bantamweight (-55kg) title.
2024-12-08	Win	(Japan) Toki Oshika	Krush 169	Tokyo, Japan	Decision (Majority)	3	3:00
2024-07-07	Loss	(Japan) Koji Ikeda	K-1 World MAX 2024 - World Championship Tournament Final	Tokyo, Japan	TKO (Punches)	2	2:05
2024-03-30	Win	(Japan) Kensuke	Krush 159	Tokyo, Japan	KO (Right cross)	1	2:22
2023-07-17	Loss	(Japan) Chikara Iwao	K-1 World GP 2023	Tokyo, Japan	KO (Body punches)	1	1:45
2023-03-25	Win	(Japan) Ikko	Krush 147	Tokyo, Japan	KO (Punches)	1	2:13
2022-03-26	Win	(Japan) Takaya Ogura	Krush 135	Tokyo, Japan	Decision (Majority)	3	3:00
2021-09-20	Loss	(Japan) Akihiro Kaneko	K-1 World GP 2021: Yokohamatsuri	Yokohama, Japan	TKO (Three knockdowns)	1	2:35
2021-05-30	Win	(Japan) Yuto Kuroda	Krush.125	Tokyo, Japan	Ext.R Decision (Split)	3	3:00
2021-02-27	Win	(Japan) Aoi Noda	Krush 122	Tokyo, Japan	TKO (Right Cross)	2	
2020-11-03	Loss	(Japan) Kazuki Miburo	K-1 World GP 2020 in Fukuoka	Fukuoka, Japan	Decision (Split)	3	3:00
2020-06-28	Win	(Japan) Toma Kuroda	Krush 115	Tokyo, Japan	Ext.R Decision (Unanimous)	4	3:00
2020-03-28	Loss	(Japan) Begin Yoshioka	Krush.112	Tokyo, Japan	Decision (Unanimous)	3	3:00
2019-11-08	Loss	(Japan) Junki Sasaki	Krush.107	Tokyo, Japan	Decision (Unanimous)	3	3:00
Lost the Krush Bantamweight -53kg title.
2019-06-30	Loss	(Armenia) Samvel Babayan	K-1 World GP 2019: Super Bantamweight World Tournament, Quarter Finals	Saitama, Japan	Decision (Majority)	3	3:00
2019-04-19	Win	(Japan) Junya Weerasakreck	Krush 100	Tokyo, Japan	Decision (Unanimous)	3	3:00
Wins the Krush Bantamweight -53kg title.
2019-01-26	Win	(Japan) Shuto Hagiwara	Krush.97	Tokyo, Japan	Ext.R Decision (Unanimous)	4	3:00
2018-09-30	Win	(Japan) Taisuke Degai	Krush.93	Tokyo, Japan	Decision (Unanimous)	3	3:00
2018-06-30	Win	(Japan) Yuta Kuwata	Krush.89	Tokyo, Japan	Decision (Majority)	3	3:00
2018-04-22	Loss	(Japan) Junya Weerasakreck	Krush.87	Tokyo, Japan	Decision (Unanimous)	3	3:00
2018-01-27	NC	(Japan) Naoya Otada	Krush.84	Tokyo, Japan	No Contest (doctor stop)	1	
2017-08-20	Loss	(Japan) Aoshi	Krush.79	Nagoya, Japan	KO (Punches)	2	2:01
2017-05-13	Win	(Japan) Reiji Kasami	KHAOS.2	Tokyo, Japan	TKO (Punches)	1	2:53
2017-01-15	Loss	(Japan) Akihiro Kaneko	Krush.72	Tokyo, Japan	KO (Left Hook)	3	2:00
2015-12-12	Win	(Japan) Tsubasa Hirano	J-NEXUS 2015～DAY～	Tokyo, Japan	Decision (Unanimous)	3	3:00
2015-09-20	Win	(Japan) Shun	Japan Kickboxing Innovation	Okayama, Japan	KO		
Legend: Win Loss Draw/No contest Notes

=== Amateur record ===
Amateur Kickboxing record
Date	Result	Opponent	Event	Location	Method	Round	Time
2015-02-22	Win	(Japan) Kyosuke Yamazaki	NEXT LEVEL Shikoku 15	Shikoku, Japan	Decision (Unanimous)	2	2:00
2014-10-19	Loss	(Japan) Taito Gunji	2nd K-1 Amateur Challenge 2014, B-class -55 kg Tournament Semi Final	Tokyo, Japan	Decision (Majority)	1	2:00
2014-07-21	Loss	(Japan) Issei ichiki	1st K-1 Amateur Challenge 2014, B-class -55 kg Tournament Semi Final	Tokyo, Japan	Decision (Unanimous)	1	2:00
2014-07-21	Win	(Japan) Takehiko Tanigawa	1st K-1 Amateur Challenge 2014, B-class -55 kg Tournament Quarter Final	Tokyo, Japan	Decision (Unanimous)	1	2:00
2014-02-23	Win	(Japan) Yuta Takahashi	NEXT LEVEL Shikoku 12	Shikoku, Japan	Decision (Unanimous)	2	2:00
2014-02-02	Win	(Japan) Yusuke Nakajima	KAKUMEI Kickboxing	Tokyo, Japan	Decision (Unanimous)	2	2:00
Legend: Win Loss Draw/No contest Notes

== See also ==
- List of male kickboxers
