= Begin Yoshioka =

Japanese male kickboxer

- Born: Bigin Yoshioka 吉岡 微吟; 12 June 2000 (age 26); Himeji, Japan
- Nationality: Japanese
- Height: 1.63 m (5 ft 4 in)
- Weight: 53 kg (117 lb; 8.3 st)
- Division: Flyweight
- Style: Kickboxing
- Fighting out of: Osaka, Japan
- Team: Team ALL-WIN
- Years active: 2014-present

Kickboxing record
- Total: 20
- Wins: 13
- By knockout: 1
- Losses: 5
- By knockout: 1
- Draws: 2

Mixed martial arts record
- Total: 1
- Losses: 1

Begin Yoshioka (吉岡 ビギン, born 12 June 2000) is a Japanese kickboxer, currently signed with K-1. He is the former Krush Bantamweight champion.

He was ranked the #10 flyweight according to Combat Press between September 2020 and October 2020.

== Kickboxing career ==
=== Early career ===
Yoshioka experienced his only loss in his early professional career to Naoki Yamada at Hoost Cup Kings Kyoto 4, decided by majority decision.

Three months later, he fought at Hoost Cup Kings Nagoya 4 against Kaito Komaki, resulting in a majority draw.

Yoshioka was scheduled to fight Koki at Krush 112, where he secured a unanimous decision victory.

=== Krush ===
==== Krush Bantamweight title reign ====
He was scheduled to fight Koji Ikeda, in the first round of the Krush Bantamweight tournament, at Krush 118 on 17 October 2020. He won the fight by a split decision. Advancing to the semifinals, Yoshioka was scheduled to fight Toma Kuroda. He defeated Kuroda by unanimous decision, and faced Mao Hashimoto in the final bout of the tournament. The fight went into an extra round, after which Yoshioka won a split decision.

He was scheduled to make his first title defense against Miburo Kazuki, at Krush 123 on 27 March 2021. As Yohioka came into the fight 1.3 kg over the weight limit, he was deducted two points at the start of the bout and fought with heavier gloves. He lost by majority decision.

==== Krush Super Bantamweight tournament ====
Yoshioka took part in the Krush Super Bantamweight tournament, held to crown a new champion. He was scheduled to face Riamu at Krush 128, on 21 August 2021, in the tournament quarterfinals. Yoshioka had trouble making weight for the bout, as he came in 1.3 kg over the super bantamweight limit on his first weigh-in. He was unable to make weight for the second weight in as well, coming in .5 kg over the limit. As a result, Yoshioka was forced to fight with 10 oz gloves instead of the 8 oz gloves, was given an automatic 1 point deduction at the beginning of the fight, and was deducted 20% from his fight purse. Yoshioka lost the fight by unanimous decision.

==== Continued Super Bantamweight career ====
Yoshioka was booked to face Lyra Nagasaki at Krush 137 on 21 May 2022. He lost the fight by a second-round knockout.

Yoshioka faced the one-time KNOCK OUT RED Super Flyweight champion Yusei Shirahata at Krush.146 on 25 February 2023. He lost the fight by majority decision.

== Championships and accomplishments ==
Professional

- 2020 Krush Bantamweight (-53kg) Champion

Amateur

- 2011 King of Strikers Jr -35 kg Champion
- 2013 Kyoken Jr Kickboxing welterweight Champion

== Mixed martial arts record ==
Professional record breakdown
2 matches	0 wins	2 losses
By knockout	0	1
By submission	0	1

Res.	Record	Opponent	Method	Event	Date	Round	Time	Location	Notes
Loss	0–2	Kakuto	TKO	DEEP Osaka Impact 2025 1st Round	6 April 2025	1	2:14	Osaka, Japan	Strawweight debut.
Loss	0–1	Taichi Oizumi	submission (rear naked choke)	DEEP Osaka Impact 2024 4th Round	22 December 2024	1	1:24	Osaka, Japan	catchweight (55 kg)

== Kickboxing record ==
Professional Kickboxing Record (incomplete)
13 Wins (1 (T)KO's), 5 Losses, 2 Draw, 0 No Contest
Date	Result	Opponent	Event	Location	Method	Round	Time
2023-09-29	Win	(Japan) Takeru Itabashi	Krush 153	Tokyo, Japan	Decision (Unanimous)	3	3:00
2023-02-25	Loss	(Japan) Yusei Shirahata	Krush.146	Tokyo, Japan	Decision (Majority)	3	3:00
2022-05-21	Loss	(Japan) Lyra Nagasaki	Krush 137	Tokyo, Japan	KO (Right straight)	2	1:46
2021-08-21	Loss	(Japan) Riamu	Krush 128 – 55 kg Championship Tournament, Quarterfinals	Tokyo, Japan	Decision (Unanimous)	3	3:00
Yoshioka came in 0.5kg over the limit. He had to wear 10oz gloves and was deducted 1 point at the beginning of the fight.
2021-03-27	Loss	(Japan) Kazuki Miburo	Krush 123	Tokyo, Japan	Decision (Majority)	3	3:00
Loses the Krush Bantamweight Championship. Yoshioka came in 1.3kg over the limit. He had to wear 10oz gloves and was deducted 2 points at the beginning of the fight.
2020-12-19	Win	(Japan) Mao Hashimoto	Krush 120, -53 kg Championship Tournament Final	Tokyo, Japan	Ext.R Decision (Split)	4	3:00
Wins the Krush Bantamweight Championship.
2020-12-19	Win	(Japan) Toma Kuroda	Krush 120, -53 kg Championship Tournament Semi Finals	Tokyo, Japan	Decision (Unanimous)	3	3:00
2020-10-17	Win	(Japan) Koji Ikeda	Krush 118, -53 kg Championship Tournament Quarter Finals	Tokyo, Japan	Decision (Split)	3	3:00
2020-03-28	Win	(Japan) Koki	Krush 112	Tokyo, Japan	Decision (Unanimous)	3	3:00
2019-11-16	Win	(Japan) Aoshi	Krush 108	Osaka, Japan	Ext.R Decision (Split)	4	3:00
2018-05-20	Draw	(Japan) Kaito Komaki	Hoost Cup Kings Nagoya 4	Nagoya, Japan	Decision (Majority)	3	3:00
2018-02-25	Loss	(Japan) Naoki Yamada	Hoost Cup Kings Kyoto 4	Kyoto, Japan	Decision (Majority)	3	3:00
2017-12-10	Win	(Japan) Kiyoyuki	RKS PROFESSIONAL FIGHTING GOLD RUSH	Osaka, Japan	TKO	3	0:40
2014-07-20	Win	(Japan) Yuya Ohara	GO-1 spirits BODYMAKER	Osaka, Japan	Decision (Majority)	3	3:00
Legend: Win Loss Draw/No contest Notes

=== Amateur record ===
Amateur Kickboxing Record
Date	Result	Opponent	Event	Location	Method	Round	Time
2014-03-30	Loss	(Japan) Kazuya Oohara	MA Japan Kickboxing RKS	Osaka, Japan	Decision (Unanimous)	2	2:00
For the RKS Jr -52kg title.
2013-07-07	Win	(Japan) Riku Kitani	Kyoken Jr. Kick 9	Osaka, Japan	Decision (Unanimous)	2	2:00
2013-05-26	Draw	(Japan) Kazane Nagai	GLADIATOR 56	Osaka, Japan	Decision	2	2:00
2013-03-31	Win	(Japan) Shoki Kaneda	Chakuriki Gold Rush in RKS	Osaka, Japan	Decision (Split)	2	2:00
2013-03-17	Loss	(Japan) Riku Kitani	Kyoken Jr. Kick 7	Osaka, Japan	Decision (Majority)	2	2:00
Lost the KJC Jr welterweight title.
2013-01-20	Win	(Japan) Riku Kitani	Kyoken Jr. Kick 6, Final	Osaka, Japan	Decision (Unanimous)	2	2:00
Wins the KJC Jr welterweight title.
2013-01-20	Win	(Japan) Yuuji Hayashi	Kyoken Jr. Kick 6, Semi Final	Osaka, Japan	Decision	2	2:00
2013-01-20	Win	(Japan) Kosuke Utsumi	Kyoken Jr. Kick.6, Quarter Final	Osaka, Japan	Decision	2	2:00
2012-11-18	Loss	(Japan) Riku Kitani	Kyoken Jr. Kick, Final	Osaka, Japan	Ext.R Decision (Unanimous)	3	2:00
For the KJC Jr welterweight title.
2012-11-18	Win	(Japan) Katsuya Aoki	Kyoken Jr. Kick, Semi Final	Osaka, Japan	Decision	2	2:00
2012-11-18	Win	(Japan) Rika Nakagawa	Kyoken Jr. Kick, Quarter Final	Osaka, Japan	Decision	2	2:00
2012-11-18	Win	(Japan) Takeshi Ikeda	Kyoken Jr. Kick, First Round	Osaka, Japan	Decision	2	2:00
2012-09-02	Loss	(Japan) Riku Kitani	Kyoken Jr. Kick, Final	Osaka, Japan	Ext.R Decision (Split)		
2012-09-02	Win	(Japan) Keita Fujishiro	Kyoken Jr. Kick, Semi Final	Osaka, Japan	Decision	2	2:00
2012-07-15	Win	(Japan) Rika Nakagawa	Kyoken Jr. Kick 3	Osaka, Japan	Decision (Majority)	2	2:00
2012-07-15	Win	(Japan) Ryuya Tsugawa	Kyoken Jr. Kick 3	Osaka, Japan	Decision (Unanimous)	2	2:00
2012-07-01	Loss	(Japan) Kazuki Yamada	Muay Thai WINDY Super Fight in NAGOYA～MuayThaiphoon!～	Aichi Prefecture, Japan	Decision		
2012-05-26	Draw	(Japan) Harumi Nagai	GLADIATOR 56	Osaka, Japan	Decision	2	2:00
2012-03-11	Win	(Japan) Koki Fukuoka	Kyoken Jr. Kick 1	Osaka, Japan	Decision (Unanimous)	2	2:00
2012-01-29	Loss	(Japan) Hiroki Koga	King of Strikers 7	Osaka, Japan	Decision	3	2:00
For the King of Strikers Jr. -40kg title.
2011-10-10	Win	(Japan) Toi Kita	King of Strikers 7, Final	Fukuoka Prefecture, Japan	Decision	3	2:00
Wins the King of Strikers Jr. -35kg title.
2011-10-10	Win	(Japan) Shinsuke Matsumoto	King of Strikers 7, Semi Final	Fukuoka Prefecture, Japan	Decision	1	2:00
2011-07-03	Loss	(Japan) Tatsuya Sakakibara	Muay Thai WINDY Super Fight in NAGOYA ～Muay Typhoon!～	Nagoya, Japan	Decision	2	2:00
2011-05-04	Loss	(Japan) Hayato Nakanishi	Kakutougi MISSION 21	Osaka, Japan	Decision (Unanimous)	2	1:30
2011-05-04	Win	(Japan) Ryusei Shimizu	Kakutougi MISSION 21	Osaka, Japan	Ext.R Decision (Unanimous)	3	1:30
2010-10-10	Win	(Japan) Ohtani	NEXT LEVEL NJKF 3	Okayama Prefecture, Japan	Decision (Unanimous)	2	1:30
2010-08-08	Draw	(Japan) Yuto Kuroda	DEEP☆KICK 4	Osaka, Japan	Decision	2	2:00
2010-04-25	Win	(Japan) Ryouto Maruo	NEXT LEVEL NJKF 1	Okayama Prefecture, Japan	KO	2	
2010-04-25	Win	(Japan) Takumi Sakamoto	NEXT LEVEL NJKF 1	Okayama Prefecture, Japan	Ext.R Decision (Majority)	3	2:00
Legend: Win Loss Draw/No contest Notes

== See also ==
- List of male kickboxers
