= 2022 in K-1 =

Mixed martial arts events

2021 in K-1

Information
- First date: February 27, 2022

The year 2022 is the 29th year in the history of the K-1, a Japanese kickboxing promotion. The year started with K-1 World GP 2022 Japan.

== List of events ==
#	Event title	Date	Arena	Location
1	K-1 World GP 2022 Japan	February 27, 2022	Tokyo Metropolitan Gymnasium	Tokyo, Japan
2	K-1: K'Festa 5	April 3, 2022	Yoyogi National Gymnasium	Tokyo, Japan
3	THE MATCH 2022	June 19, 2022	Tokyo Dome	Tokyo, Japan
4	K-1: Ring of Venus	June 25, 2022	Yoyogi National Gymnasium	Tokyo, Japan
5	K-1 World GP 2022 in Fukuoka	August 11, 2022	Fukuoka Convention Center	Fukuoka, Japan
6	K-1 World GP 2022 Yokohamatsuri	September 11, 2022	Yokohama Arena	Yokohama, Japan
7	K-1 World GP 2022 in Osaka	December 3, 2022	Edion Arena Osaka	Osaka, Japan

== K-1 World GP 2022 Japan ==
K-1 World GP 2022 Japan
- Promotion: K-1
- Date: February 27, 2022
- Venue: Tokyo Metropolitan Gymnasium
- City: Tokyo, Japan

K-1 World GP 2022 Japan was a kickboxing event held by K-1, which will be held on February 27, 2022, at the Tokyo Metropolitan Gymnasium in Tokyo, Japan.

=== Background ===
A K-1 Women's Flyweight Championship bout between reigning champion Kana Morimoto and title challenger Kotomi was expected to take place at the event. Kotomi later withdrew, and was replaced by Ran, who faced Morimoto in a non-title bout.

K-1 Lightweight Champion Taio Asahisa was scheduled to face Yuki Yoza in a non-title bout.

A Super Bantamweight World Grand Prix is expected to take place during the event. The tournament was organized to fill the vacant K-1 Super Bantamweight title.

Reigning Krush Super Lightweight champion Daizo Sasaki was scheduled to face Vitor Toffanelli.

==== K-1 Japan Super Bantamweight Tournament bracket ====
Quarter-Finals
(Japan) Riamu	DEC
(Japan) Ikko	3R
(Japan) Akihiro Kaneko	KO
(Japan) Yuto Kuroda	2R
(Japan) Masashi Kumura	KO
(Japan) Momotaro Kiyama	1R
(Japan) Junki Sasaki	DEC
(Japan) Sho Uchida	4R

Semi-Finals
(Japan) Riamu	TKO
(Japan) Akihiro Kaneko	2R
(Japan) Masashi Kumura	TKO
(Japan) Junki Sasaki	1R

Final
(Japan) Akihiro Kaneko	DEC
(Japan) Masashi Kumura	3R

=== Fight Card ===
K-1 World GP 2022 Japan
Weight Class				Method	Round	Time	Notes
Super Bantamweight 55 kg	(Japan) Akihiro Kaneko	def.	(Japan) Masashi Kumura	Decision (Majority)	3	3:00	Super Bantamweight Tournament Finals
Catchweight 58 kg	(Japan) Takeru Segawa	draw.	(Japan) Taito Gunji		2	2:00	Exhibition bout.
Super Lightweight 65 kg	(Japan) Yuki Yoza	def.	(Japan) Taio Asahisa	Ext.R Decision (Unanimous)	4	3:00	
W. Flyweight 52 kg	(Japan) Kana Morimoto	def.	(Japan) Ran	Decision (Unanimous)	3	3:00	
Super Lightweight 65 kg	(Japan) Daizo Sasaki	def.	(Brazil) Vitor Tofanelli	Decision (Unanimous)	3	3:00	
Super Welterweight 70 kg	(Nepal) Abiral Ghimire	def.	(Japan) Daiki Matsushita	TKO (Punches)	1	2:00	
Super featherweight 60 kg	(Japan) Ryusei Ashizawa	def.	(Japan) Narufumi Nishimoto	TKO (Three knockdowns)	2	1:58	
Catchweight 61 kg	(Japan) Kotaro Shimano	def.	(Japan) Hirotaka Urabe	KO (Right cross)	3	2:51	
Super Bantamweight 55 kg	(Japan) Masashi Kumura	def.	(Japan) Junki Sasaki	TKO (2 Knockdown rule/Punches)	1	1:37	Super Bantamweight Tournament Semifinals
Super Bantamweight 55 kg	(Japan) Akihiro Kaneko	def.	(Japan) Riamu	TKO (2 Knockdown/Low kick)	2	2:23	Super Bantamweight Tournament Semifinals
Minimumweight 48 kg	(Japan) Miho Takanashi	def.	(Japan) Yuka	Decision (Majority)	3	3:00	
Welterweight 67.5 kg	(Japan) Kota Nakano	def.	(Japan) Kazuki Yamagiwa	Decision (Unanimous)	3	3:00	
Catchweight 73 kg	(Japan) Katsuya Jinbo	def.	(Brazil) Danilo Zanolini	Decision (Unanimous)	3	3:00	
Featherweight 57.5 kg	(Japan) Shuhei Kumura	def.	(Japan) Kaito Ozawa	Decision (Unanimous)	3	3:00	
Lightweight 62.5 kg	(Japan) Yuto Shinohara	def.	(Japan) Shuji Kawarada	Decision (Unanimous)	3	3:00	
Lightweight 62.5 kg	(Japan) Yuzuki Satomi	def.	(Japan) Ryuka	Ext. R. Decision (Split)	3	3:00	
Super Bantamweight 55 kg	(Japan) Junki Sasaki	def.	(Japan) Sho Uchida	Ext.R Decision (Unanimous)	4	3:00	Super Bantamweight Tournament Quarterfinals
Super Bantamweight 55 kg	(Japan) Masashi Kumura	def.	(Japan) Momotaro Kiyama	KO (Left kick to the body)	1	1:24	Super Bantamweight Tournament Quarterfinals
Super Bantamweight 55 kg	(Japan) Riamu	def.	(Japan) Ikko	Decision (Unanimous)	3	3:00	Super Bantamweight Tournament Quarterfinals
Super Bantamweight 55 kg	(Japan) Akihiro Kaneko	def.	(Japan) Yuto Kuroda	KO (Right cross)	3	2:17	Super Bantamweight Tournament Quarterfinals
Preliminary Card
Super bantamweight 55 kg	(Japan) Eiki Kurata	def.	(Japan) Eruto	KO (Head kick)	1	2:28	Super Bantamweight Tournament Reserve Bout
Super bantamweight 55 kg	(Japan) "Kyoken" Jin	def.	(Japan) Kosuke	TKO (Left hook)	3	1:19	
Super featherweight 60 kg	(Japan) Haru Furumiya	def.	(Japan) Taihei Shimomura	Decision (Unanimous)	3	3:00	
Featherweight 57.5 kg	(Japan) Satoshi Tanaka	def.	(Japan) Sota Amano	TKO (Referee stoppage)	3	2:51	
Catchweight 52 kg	(Japan) Rui Okubo	def.	(Japan) Shohei Nishibayashi	Decision (Unanimous)	3	3:00	

== K-1: K'Festa 5 ==
K-1: K'Festa 5
- Promotion: K-1
- Date: April 3, 2022
- Venue: Yoyogi National Gymnasium
- City: Tokyo, Japan

K-1: K'Festa 5 will be a kickboxing event held by K-1, which will be held on April 3, 2022, at the Yoyogi National Gymnasium in Tokyo, Japan.

=== Background ===
An openweight tournament was held during the event. It featured the former K-1 cruiserweight champion K-Jee, the former K-1 heavyweight champion Kyotaro Fujimoto, current Krush cruiserweight champion Mahmoud Sattari, as well as Hidenori Sakamoto, Kosuke Jitsukata, Satoshi Ishii, Animal Koji and Seiya Tanigawa.

A K-1 Super Lightweight Championship bout between the reigning titleholder Hideaki Yamazaki and title challenger Tetsuya Yamato was scheduled for the event.

K1 Featherweight champion Taito Gunji was booked to face Toma Tanabe in a non-title bout.

==== K-1 Japan Openweight Tournament bracket ====
Quarter-Finals
(Japan) K-Jee	KO
(Iran) Mahmoud Sattari	1R
(Japan) Kyotaro Fujimoto	TKO
(Japan) Hidenori Sakamoto	2R
(Croatia) Satoshi Ishii	KO
(Japan) Kosuke Jitsukata	2R
(Japan) Seiya Tanigawa	DEC
(Japan) Animal Koji	3R

Semi-Finals
(Iran) Mahmoud Sattari	DEC
(Japan) Kyotaro Fujimoto	3R
(Japan) Hisaki Kato	KO
(Japan) Seiya Tanigawa	1R

Final
(Iran) Mahmoud Sattari	KO
(Japan) Seiya Tanigawa	3R

=== Fight Card ===
K-1: K'Festa 5
Weight Class				Method	Round	Time	Notes
Openweight	(Iran) Mahmoud Sattari	def.	(Japan) Seiya Tanigawa	KO (Right straight)	3	0:17	K-1 Japan Openweight tournament final
Super lightweight 65 kg	(Japan) Tetsuya Yamato	def.	(Japan) Hideaki Yamazaki (c)	KO (Left hook)	1	0:50	For the K-1 Super Lightweight Championship
Welterweight 67.5 kg	(Japan) Masaaki Noiri	def.	(Japan) Kona Kato	TKO (Corner stoppage)	2	1:50	
Welterweight 67.5 kg	(Japan) Rukiya Anpo	def.	(Thailand) Playchumphon Sor.Srisomphong	KO (Left hook to the body)	1	2:17	
Featherweight 60 kg	(Japan) Hirotaka Asahisa	def.	(Japan) Yuta Murakoshi	KO (Jumping knee)	1	1:42	
Super featherweight 60 kg	(Japan) Tatsuya Oiwa	def.	(Japan) Yuki Egawa	Decision (Unanimous)	3	3:00	
Featherweight 57.5 kg	(Japan) Taito Gunji	def.	(Japan) Toma Tanabe	Ext. R. Dec. (Unanimous)	4	3:00	
Featherweight 57.5 kg	(Japan) Tatsuya Tsubakihara	def.	(Japan) Takahito Niimi	Decision (Unanimous)	3	3:00	
Openweight	(Iran) Mahmoud Sattari	def.	(Japan) Kyotaro Fujimoto	Decision (Majority)	3	3:00	K-1 Japan Openweight tournament semifinals
Openweight	(Japan) Seiya Tanigawa	def.	(Japan) Hisaki Kato	KO (Head kick)	1	2:20	K-1 Japan Openweight tournament semifinals
Lightweight 62.5 kg	(Thailand) Kongnapa Weerasakreck	def.	(Japan) Shoya Suzuki	KO (Knee)	1	2:13	
Middleweight 75 kg	(Japan) Shintaro Matsukura	def.	(Brazil) Julio Cesar Mori	Decision (Unanimous)	3	3:00	
Catchweight 61 kg	(Japan) Kyoken	def.	(Japan) Satoru Nariai	KO (Right straight)	2	2;29	
Super lightweight 65 kg	(Japan) Hayato Suzuki	def.	(Japan) Kenta Hayashi	TKO (Referee stoppage)	3	0:19	
Super lightweight 65 kg	(Japan) Fukashi Mizutani	def.	(Japan) Ruku Kojima	TKO (Corner stoppage)	3	2:15	
Openweight	(Iran) Mahmoud Sattari	def.	(Japan) K-Jee	KO (Left hook)	1	1:28	K-1 Japan Openweight tournament quarterfinals
Openweight	(Japan) Kyotaro Fujimoto	def.	(Japan) Hidenori Sakamoto	TKO (Referee stoppage)	2	2:11	K-1 Japan Openweight tournament quarterfinals
Openweight	(Croatia) Satoshi Ishii	def.	(Japan) Kosuke Jitsukata	KO (Left straight)	2	1:02	K-1 Japan Openweight tournament quarterfinals
Openweight	(Japan) Seiya Tanigawa	def.	(Japan) Animal Koji	Decision (Unanimous)	3	3:00	K-1 Japan Openweight tournament quarterfinals
Openweight	(Japan) Hisaki Kato	def.	(Japan) Ryo Aitaka	KO (Left hook)	3	1:05	K-1 Japan Openweight tournament reserve bout
Preliminary Card
Openweight	(Japan) Ryunosuke Hoshi	def.	(Japan) RUI	KO (Right straight)	1	2:50	

== THE MATCH 2022 ==
The Match 2022
- Promotion: Rizin Fighting Federation; K-1; RISE
- Date: June 19, 2022
- Venue: Tokyo Dome
- City: Tokyo, Japan

THE MATCH 2022 was a kickboxing event held as a partnership between K-1 and RISE, and produced in-association with the Rizin Fighting Federation, on June 19, 2022, in Tokyo, Japan.

=== Background ===
The main event featured the RISE Featherweight champion Tenshin Nasukawa in a non-title crossover fight with K-1 Super Featherweight champion Takeru Segawa.

=== Fight Card ===
The Match 2022
Weight Class				Method	Round	T.Time
Catchweight 58 kg	(Japan) Tenshin Nasukawa	def.	(Japan) Takeru	Decision (Unanimous)	3	3:00
Catchweight 68.5 kg	(Japan) Kaito Ono	def.	(Japan) Masaaki Noiri	Ext R. Decision (Unanimous)	4	3:00
Super lightweight 65 kg	(Japan) Kento Haraguchi	def.	(Japan) Hideaki Yamazaki	TKO (Ref Stoppage)	2	0:33
Super lightweight 65 kg	(Japan) Rukiya Anpo	def.	(Japan) Kosei Yamada	Decision (Unanimous)	3	3:00
Lightweight 63 kg	(Thailand) Kongnapa Weerasakreck	def.	(Japan) Taiju Shiratori	TKO (Punch)	1	2:42
Catchweight 62 kg	(Japan) Kan Nakamura	def.	(Japan) Leona Pettas	Decision (Majority)	3	3:00
Catchweight 62 kg	(Japan) YA-MAN	def.	(Japan) Ryusei Ashizawa	KO (punch)	1	1:49
Catchweight 71 kg	(Japan) Hiromi Wajima	def.	(Japan) BeyNoah	Decision (Unanimous)	3	3:00
Catchweight 100 kg	(Iran) Sina Karimian	def.	(Japan) Rikiya Yamashita	Decision (Unanimous)	3	3:00
Catchweight 100 kg	(Iran) Mahmoud Sattari	def.	(Japan) Yuta Uchida	KO (punch)	1	
Super featherweight 60 kg	(Japan) Yuki Kasahara	def.	(Japan) Chihiro Nakajima	Decision (Unanimous)	3	3:00
Bantamweight 53 kg	(Japan) Kazane Nagai	def.	(Japan) Toma Kuroda	Ext R. Decision (Unanimous)	4	3:00
Super bantamweight 55 kg	(Japan) Mutsuki Ebata	def.	(Japan) Riamu	Ext R. Decision (Split)	4	3:00
Super bantamweight 55 kg	(Japan) Masashi Kumura	def.	(Japan) Shiro	Decision (Unanimous)	3	3:00
Super bantamweight 55 kg	(Japan) Masahiko Suzuki	def.	(Japan) Akihiro Kaneko	Decision (Majority)	3	3:00
Bantamweight 53 kg	(Japan) Rui Okubo	def.	(Japan) Ryujin Nasukawa	Decision (Unanimous)	3	3:00

== K-1: Ring of Venus ==
K-1: Ring of Venus
- Promotion: K-1
- Date: June 25, 2022
- Venue: Yoyogi National Gymnasium
- City: Tokyo, Japan

K-1: Ring of Venus will be a kickboxing event held by K-1, which will be held on June 25, 2022, at the Yoyogi National Gymnasium in Tokyo, Japan.

=== Background ===
Multiple-time Shootboxing tournament winner Mio Tsumura is booked to face Phayahong Ayothayafightgym in the semifinals of the K-1 atomweight Grand Prix. The second atomweight bout pits the reigning Krush atomweight champion Miyuu Sugawara against Kira Matsutani.

Kana Morimoto, Mako Yamada and Miho Takanashi are scheduled to participate in a Japan versus the world matchups, where they will face international opponents.

=== Fight Card ===
K-1: Ring of Venus
Weight Class				Method	Round	Time	Notes
Flyweight 50 kg	(Japan) Kana Morimoto (c)	def.	(France) Souris Manfredi	KO (Head kick)	3	1:28	For the K-1 Women's Flyweight title
Atomweight 45 kg	(Thailand) Phayahong Ayothayafightgym	def.	(Japan) Miyuu Sugawara	Ext. R. Decision (Majority)	4	3:00	K-1 Atomweight Grand Prix Final
Catchweight 53 kg	(Australia) Jacinta Austin	def.	(Japan) SAHO	Decision (Unanimous)	3	3:00	
Minimumweight 48 kg	(Turkey) Erivan Barut	def.	(Japan) Miho Takanashi	Decision (Majority)	3	3:00	
Minimumweight 48 kg	(Japan) Mako Yamada	def.	(France) Marine Bigey	Decision (Unanimous)	3	3:00	
Flyweight 52 kg	(Japan) Mahiro	def.	(Japan) Yoshimi Ohama	Decision (Unanimous)	3	3:00	
Flyweight 52 kg	(Japan) Mariya Suzuki	def.	(Japan) Rikako Sakurai	Decision (Unanimous)	3	3:00	
Minimumweight 48 kg	(Japan) Moe Takahashi	def.	(Japan) MARI	Ext. R. Decision (Unanimous)	4	3:00	
Flyweight 52 kg	(Japan) Noriko Ikeuchi	def.	(Japan) Arina	Ext. R. Decision (Unanimous)	4	3:00	
Atomweight 45 kg	(Japan) Nana Okuwaki	def.	(Japan) Yuri Morikawa	Decision (Majority)	3	3:00	
Atomweight 45 kg	(Japan) Miyuu Sugawara	def.	(Japan) Kira Matsutani	Decision (Majority)	3	3:00	K-1 Atomweight Grand Prix semifinals
Atomweight 45 kg	(Thailand) Phayahong Ayothayafightgym	def.	(Japan) Mio Tsumura	Decision (Unanimous)	3	3:00	K-1 Atomweight Grand Prix semifinals
Atomweight 45 kg	(Japan) Chan Lee	def.	(Japan) Raika Nagasaki	KO (Left straight)	2	1:26	K-1 Atomweight Grand Prix alternate bout
Minimumweight 48 kg	(Japan) Keito Weerasakreck	def.	(Japan) Kai	Decision (Unanimous)	3	3:00	
Minimumweight 48 kg	(Japan) Masami	def.	(Japan) C-ZUKA	KO (Punches)	3	1:35	
Catchweight 55 kg	(Japan) Noriko Ueno	def.	(Japan) Yuka	Decision (Unanimous)	3	3:00	
Flyweight 52 kg	(Japan) RAN	def.	(Japan) Naomi Toody	Decision (Unanimous)	3	3:00	
Preliminary Card
Atomweight 45 kg	(Japan) Kiho	draw.	(Japan) Miho Yata	Decision (Majority)	3	2:00	
Atomweight 45 kg	(Japan) Naru Yoshizaki	def.	(Japan) Aiko	Decision (Split)	3	2:00	
Atomweight 45 kg	(Japan) Yura	def.	(Japan) Noa Tozawa	Decision (Unanimous)	3	2:00	

== K-1 World GP 2022 in Fukuoka ==
K-1 World GP 2022 in Fukuoka
- Promotion: K-1
- Date: August 11, 2022
- Venue: Fukuoka Convention Center
- City: Fukuoka, Japan

K-1 World GP 2022 in Fukuoka will be a kickboxing event held by K-1, which will be held on August 11, 2022, at the Fukuoka Convention Center in Fukuoka, Japan.

=== Background ===
A Featherweight World Grand Prix was held during the event, featuring Jawsuayai Sor.Dechaphan, Shuhei Kumura, Taito Gunji, Facu Suarez, Tatsuya Tsubakihara, Toma Tanabe, Takahito Niimi and Wang Junguang.

=== K-1 World Featherweight Tournament bracket ===
Quarter-Finals
(Japan) Shuhei Kumura	TKO
(Thailand) Jawsuayai Sor.Dechaphan	2
(Japan) Taito Gunji	UD
(Argentina) Facu Suarez	3
(Japan) Tatsuya Tsubakihara	3
(Japan) Toma Tanabe	MD
(Japan) Takahito Niimi	3
(China) Wang Junguang	UD

Semi-Finals
(Japan) Shuhei Kumura	1
(Japan) Taito Gunji	TKO
(Japan) Toma Tanabe	UD
(China) Wang Junguang	3

Final
(Japan) Taito Gunji	TKO
(Japan) Toma Tanabe	1

=== Fight Card ===
K-1 World GP 2022 in Fukuoka
Weight Class				Method	Round	Time	Notes
Featherweight 57.5 kg	(Japan) Taito Gunji	def.	(Japan) Toma Tanabe	TKO (3 knockdown/Punch)	1	2:57	K-1 Featherweight Grand Prix Final
Cruiserweight 90 kg	(Japan) Seiya Tanigawa	def.	(Japan) K-JEE	Decision (Unanimous)	3	3:00	
Bantamweight 53 kg	(Japan) Issei Ishii	def.	(Japan) Kazuki Fujita	KO (Right straight)	3	2:41	
Super Featherweight 60 kg	(Japan) Yuki Egawa	def.	(Thailand) Chachai Maki	Decision (Unanimous)	3	3:00	
Bantamweight 65 kg	(Japan) Hayato Suzuki	def.	(Japan) Kaisei Kondo	KO (Left straight)	4	1:09	
Bantamweight 53 kg	(Japan) Kazuki Miburo	def.	(Japan) Daiki Mine	Decision (Unanimous)	3	3:00	
Cruiserweight 90 kg	(Philippines) Akira Jr	def.	(Japan) Animal Koji	TKO (Punches)	2	0:20	
Featherweight 57.5 kg	(Japan) Toma Tanabe	def.	(China) Wang Junguang	Decision (Unanimous)	3	3:00	K-1 Featherweight Grand Prix Semifinal
Featherweight 57.5 kg	(Japan) Taito Gunji	def.	(Japan) Shuhei Kumura	KO (Right straight)	1	3:00	K-1 Featherweight Grand Prix Semifinal
Catchweight 63 kg	(Thailand) Kongnapa Weerasakreck	def.	(Japan) Hiroto Iwasaki	TKO (Nose injury)	1	3:00	
Lightweight 62.5 kg	(Japan) Yuki Yoza	def.	(Japan) Yuto Shinohara	TKO (Low kicks)	2	1:12	
Lightweight 62.5 kg	(Japan) Fumiya Osawa	def.	(Thailand) Dansiam Ayothayafightgym	Decision (Unanimous)	3	3:00	
Lightweight 62.5 kg	(Japan) Yuzuki Satomi	def.	(Japan) Yuma Saikyo	Decision (Unanimous)	3	3:00	
Super Heavyweight 100+ kg	(Japan) Naoto Maruyama	def.	(Japan) Hidenori Sakamoto	KO (Right cross)	2	2:30	
Welterweight 67.5 kg	(Japan) Kaito	def.	(Japan) Koki	KO (Right hook)	1	2;56	
Featherweight 57.5 kg	(China) Wang Junguang	def.	(Japan) Takahito Niimi	Decision (Unanimous)	3	3:00	K-1 Featherweight Grand Prix Quarterfinal
Featherweight 57.5 kg	(Japan) Toma Tanabe	def.	(Japan) Tatsuya Tsubakihara	Decision (Majority)	3	3:00	K-1 Featherweight Grand Prix Quarterfinal
Featherweight 57.5 kg	(Japan) Taito Gunji	def.	(Argentina) Facu Suarez	Decision (Unanimous)	3	3:00	K-1 Featherweight Grand Prix Quarterfinal
Featherweight 57.5 kg	(Japan) Shuhei Kumura	def.	(Thailand) Jawsuayai Sor.Dechaphan	TKO (2 knockdowns)	2	1:03	K-1 Featherweight Grand Prix Quarterfinal
Featherweight 57.5 kg	(Japan) Takumi Terada	def.	(Japan) Ginji	Decision (Unanimous)	3	3:00	K-1 Featherweight Grand Prix Reserve Bout
Preliminary Card
Lightweight 62.5 kg	(Japan) Ryunosuke	def.	(Japan) Rikito	Decision (Unanimous)	3	3:00	
Featherweight 57.5 kg	(Japan) Kensuke	def.	(Japan) Shinpei Hayashi	KO (Punches)	1	2:20	
Flyweight 51 kg	(Japan) Shohei Nishibayashi	def.	(Japan) Taiga	Decision (Unanimous)	3	3:00	
Flyweight 51 kg	(Japan) Kakeru Nagano	def.	(Japan) Soichiro	Decision (Unanimous)	3	3:00	

== K-1 World GP 2022 Yokohamatsuri ==
K-1 World GP 2022 Yokohamatsuri
- Promotion: K-1
- Date: September 11, 2022
- Venue: Yokohama Arena
- City: Yokohama, Japan

K-1 World GP 2022 Yokohamatsuri will be a kickboxing event held by K-1 on September 11, 2022, at the Yokohama Arena in Yokohama, Japan.

=== Background ===
The K-1 World Super Featherweight World Grand Prix was held at the event, which featured the following fighters: Tatsuya Oiwa, Adam Bouarourou, Leona Pettas, Hirotaka Asahisa, Nakrob Fairtex, Tomoya Yokoyama and Bailey Sugden. Naoki Yamamoto faced Narufumi Nishimoto in the reserve bout. Sugden withdrew from the tournament, due to an injury, on August 3. He was replaced by Stavros Exakoustidis.

A K-1 World GP Super Lightweight Championship bout between the champion Tetsuya Yamato and challenger Daizo Sasaki took place at the event.

=== K-1 World Super Featherweight Tournament bracket ===
Quarter-Finals
(Japan) Tatsuya Oiwa	UD
(Morocco) Adam Bouarourou	3
(Japan) Leona Pettas	KO
(Spain) Ayoub Segiri	2
(Japan) Hirotaka Asahisa	KO
(Thailand) Nakrob Fairtex	1
(Japan) Tomoya Yokoyama	KO
(Greece) Stavros Exakoustidis	3

Semi-Finals
(Japan) Tatsuya Oiwa	3
(Japan) Leona Pettas	KO
(Japan) Hirotaka Asahisa	TKO
(Japan) Tomoya Yokoyama	1

Final
(Japan) Leona Pettas	UD
(Japan) Hirotaka Asahisa	3

=== Fight Card ===
K-1 World GP 2022 Yokohamatsuri
Weight Class				Method	Round	Time	Notes
Super featherweight 60 kg	(Japan) Leona Pettas	def.	(Japan) Hirotaka Asahisa	Decision (Unanimous)	3	3:00	Super featherweight Grand Prix Finals; For the vacant K-1 World Super Featherweight title
Super lightweight 65 kg	(Japan) Tetsuya Yamato (c)	def.	(Japan) Daizo Sasaki	Decision (Unanimous)	3	3:00	For the K-1 World GP Super Lightweight Championship
Catchweight 56 kg	(Japan) Akihiro Kaneko	def.	(United Kingdom) Jordan Swinton	KO (Right straight to the body)	1	0:40	
Catchweight 56 kg	(Thailand) Kompetch Sitsarawatsuer	def.	(Japan) Masashi Kumura	Decision (Split)	3	3:00	
Super Welterweight 70 kg	(Japan) Hiromi Wajima	def.	(Greece) Meletis Kakoubavas	KO (Left straight)	1	1:34	
Super Welterweight 70 kg	(Thailand) Jomthong Chuwattana	def.	(Nepal) Abiral Ghimire	KO (High kick)	1	3:02	
Intermission
Super Heavyweight 100+ kg	(Iran) Sina Karimian	def.	(Japan) Kosuke Jitsukata	KO (Punches)	1	1:21	
Super featherweight 60 kg	(Japan) Hirotaka Asahisa	def.	(Japan) Tomoya Yokoyama	TKO (Two knockdowns)	1	0:37	Super featherweight Grand Prix Semifinals
Super featherweight 60 kg	(Japan) Leona Pettas	def.	(Japan) Tatsuya Oiwa	KO (Flying knee)	3	0:12	Super featherweight Grand Prix Semifinals
Catchweight 58 kg	(Japan) Riku Morisaka	def.	(Japan) Haruma Saikyo	Ext. R. Decision (Split)	4	3:00	
Super Lightweight 65 kg	(Japan) Kenta Hayashi	def.	(Japan) Ruku Kojima	KO (Left hook)	1	1:42	
Super Lightweight 65 kg	(Japan) Fukashi Mizutani	def.	(Japan) Yujiro Ono	TKO (Referee stoppage)	3	2:47	
Catchweight 75 kg	(Japan) Katsuya Jinbo	def.	(Japan) Shintaro Matsukura	KO (Right cross)	4	2:10	
Catchweight 75 kg	(Brazil) Danilo Zanolini	def.	(South Korea) Park Yohan	Decision (Majority)	3	3:00	
Super featherweight 60 kg	(Japan) Tomoya Yokoyama	def.	(Greece) Stavros Exakoustidis	KO (High kick)	3	1:41	Super featherweight Grand Prix Quarterfinals
Super featherweight 60 kg	(Japan) Hirotaka Asahisa	def.	(Thailand) Nakrob Fairtex	KO (Left hook to the body)	1	0:44	Super featherweight Grand Prix Quarterfinals
Super featherweight 60 kg	(Japan) Leona Pettas	def.	(Spain) Ayoub Segiri	KO (Punch)	2	1:01	Super featherweight Grand Prix Quarterfinals
Super featherweight 60 kg	(Japan) Tatsuya Oiwa	def.	(Morocco) Adam Bouarourou	Decision (Unanimous)	3	3:00	Super featherweight Grand Prix Quarterfinals
Super featherweight 60 kg	(Japan) Narufumi Nishimoto	def.	(Japan) Naoki Yamamoto	Decision (Unanimous)	3	3:00	Super featherweight Grand Prix Reserve Match
Preliminary Card
Super featherweight 60 kg	(Japan) Taihei Shimomura	def.	(Japan) Taiyo Miyakawa	Decision (Unanimous)	3	3:00	
Catchweight 54 kg	(Japan) Seiya Nakazawa	draw.	(Japan) Eito Kurokawa	Decision (Split)	3	3:00	

== K-1 World GP 2022 in Osaka ==
K-1 World GP 2022 in Osaka
- Promotion: K-1
- Date: December 3, 2022
- Venue: Edion Arena Osaka
- City: Osaka, Japan

K-1 World GP 2022 in Osaka will be a kickboxing event held by K-1 on December 3, 2022, at the Edion Arena Osaka in Osaka, Japan.

=== K-1 World Bantamweight Tournament bracket ===
Quarter-Finals
(Japan) Koji Ikeda	KO
(Equatorial Guinea) Ambi Nsue Avomo	2
(Japan) Issei Ishii	TKO
(Ecuador) Oscar Bohorquez	2
(Japan) Toma Kuroda	UD
(Thailand) Yodsila Chor.Hapayak	4
(Japan) Kazuki Miburo	UD
(Armenia) Samvel Babayan	3

Semi-Finals
(Japan) Koji Ikeda	3
(Japan) Issei Ishii	UD
(Japan) Toma Kuroda	MD
(Japan) Kazuki Miburo	3

Final
(Japan) Issei Ishii	4
(Japan) Toma Kuroda	SD

=== Fight Card ===
K-1 World GP 2022 in Osaka
Weight Class				Method	Round	Time	Notes
Bantamweight 53 kg	(Japan) Toma Kuroda	def.	(Japan) Issei Ishii	Ext. R. Decision (Split)	4	3:00	K-1 World Bantamweight Grand Prix Final
Featherweight 57.5 kg	(Japan) Taito Gunji	def.	(China) Wang Junguang	Decision (Majority)	3	3:00	
Heavyweight 100 kg	(Iran) Sina Karimian	def.	(Brazil) Carlos Budiao	Disqualification	2		
Flyweight 52 kg	(Japan) Kana Morimoto	def.	(France) Aurore Dos Santos	KO (Punches)	1	2:55	
Catchweight 56 kg	(Japan) Akihiro Kaneko	def.	(Thailand) Kiriluang Chor.Hapayak	KO (Punch)	3	2:38	
Catchweight 56 kg	(Japan) Masashi Kumura	def.	(Cyprus) Ismail Al Kadhi	KO (Liver kick)	2	1:45	
Cruiserweight 90 kg	(Romania) Ștefan Lătescu	def.	(Iran) Mahmoud Sattari	TKO (Referee stoppage/Punches)	2	1:37	
Intermission
Super featherweight 60 kg	(Japan) Yuki Egawa	def.	(Japan) Kotaro Shimano	TKO (Punches)	1	1:58	
Super lightweight 65 kg	(Japan) Kenta Hayashi	def.	(Japan) Fukashi Mizutani	Decision (Unanimous)	3	3:00	
Bantamweight 53 kg	(Japan) Toma Kuroda	def.	(Japan) Kazuki Miburo	Decision (Majority)	3	3:00	K-1 World Bantamweight Grand Prix Semi Final
Bantamweight 53 kg	(Japan) Issei Ishii	def.	(Japan) Koji Ikeda	Decision (Unanimous)	3	3:00	K-1 World Bantamweight Grand Prix Semi Final
Super welterweight 70 kg	(Thailand) Jomthong Chuwattana	def.	(Japan) Naoki Morita	KO (Left straight)	2	0:22	
Lightweight 62.5 kg	(Japan) Yuki Yoza	def.	(Thailand) Aikpikart Mor.Krungthepthonburi	Decision (Unanimous)	3	3:00	
Lightweight 62.5 kg	(Japan) Yuto Shinohara	def.	(Japan) Hiroki	Decision (Unanimous)	3	3:00	
Cruiserweight 90 kg	(Philippines) Akira Junior	def.	(Japan) Hisaki Kato	TKO (Referee stoppage)	2	1:40	
Intermission
Featherweight 57.5 kg	(Japan) Toma	def.	(Japan) Shuhei Kumura	Decision (Unanimous)	3	3:00	
Featherweight 57.5 kg	(Japan) Shoki Kaneda	def.	(Japan) Tatsuya Tsubakihara	Decision (Unanimous)	3	3:00	
Featherweight 57.5 kg	(Japan) Takahito Niimi	def.	(Japan) Yuta Kunieda	Decision (Majority)	3	3:00	
Bantamweight 53 kg	(Japan) Kazuki Miburo	def.	(Armenia) Samvel Babayan	Decision (Unanimous)	3	3:00	K-1 World Bantamweight Grand Prix Quarter Final
Bantamweight 53 kg	(Japan) Toma Kuroda	def.	(Thailand) Yodsila Chor.Hapayak	Ext.R Decision (Unanimous)	4	3:00	K-1 World Bantamweight Grand Prix Quarter Final
Bantamweight 53 kg	(Japan) Issei Ishii	def.	(Ecuador) Oscar Bohorquez	TKO (Referee stoppage)	2	2:47	K-1 World Bantamweight Grand Prix Quarter Final
Bantamweight 53 kg	(Japan) Koji Ikeda	def.	(Equatorial Guinea) Ambi Nsue Avomo	KO (Liver kick)	2	1:15	K-1 World Bantamweight Grand Prix Quarter Final
Bantamweight 53 kg	(Japan) Aoi Noda	def.	(Japan) Daiki Mine	TKO (Doctor stoppage)	1	1:30	K-1 World Bantamweight Grand Prix reserve fight
Preliminary Card
Featherweight 57.5 kg	(Japan) Ryota Ishida	def.	(Japan) Satoshi Tanaka	TKO (Punches)	3	1:08	
Cruiserweight 90 kg	(Japan) Shota Yamaguchi	def.	(Japan) Isami Sano	KO (Liver kick)	1	1:48	
Lightweight 62.5 kg	(Japan) Yuya Miyake	def.	(Japan) Arata	KO (Punch)	1	1:38	

== See also ==
- 2022 in Glory
- 2022 in ONE Championship
- 2022 in RISE
- 2022 in Romanian kickboxing
- 2022 in Wu Lin Feng
