= Kazuki Fujita =

Japanese footballer (born 2001)

Kazuki Fujita 藤田 和輝
Personal information
- Date of birth: 19 February 2001 (age 25)
- Place of birth: Niigata City, Niigata, Japan
- Height: 1.86 m (6 ft 1 in)
- Position: Goalkeeper

Team information
- Current team: Avispa Fukuoka
- Number: 41

Youth career
- –2018: Albirex Niigata

Senior career*
Years	Team	Apps	(Gls)
2019–2025	Albirex Niigata	39	(0)
2022–2023	→ Tochigi SC (loan)	39	(0)
2024	→ JEF United Chiba (loan)	24	(0)
2026–	Avispa Fukuoka	12	(0)

International career^{‡}
2020	Japan U19		
2021	Japan U20		
Medal record
Men's football
Representing Japan
Asian Games
Silver medal – second place	2022 Hangzhou	Team
- * Club domestic league appearances and goals as of 12 August 2026 ‡ National team caps and goals as of 17:04, 9 July 2021 (UTC)

Kazuki Fujita (藤田 和輝, Fujita Kazuki; born 19 February 2001) is a Japanese footballer who plays as a goalkeeper for J1 League club Avispa Fukuoka.

== Career ==
On 31 August 2018, Fujita was registered as a type 2 player, and it was announced he would join the team from the 2019 season. After playing 900 minutes, he signed a Professional A contract with the club on 3 December 2020.

On 30 December 2021, Fujita was announced at Tochigi SC on a one year loan.

On 15 December 2023, Fujita was announced at JEF United on loan. On 26 December 2024, it was announced he would return to Albirex Niigata.

Following the relegation of Albirex Niigata in the 2025 season, in January 2026 Fujita made a permanent transfer to J1 League club Avispa Fukuoka.

== International career ==
Fujita was part of the Japan squad for the 2022 Asian Games.

== Career statistics ==
=== Club ===
As of 30 April 2026.

Appearances and goals by club, season and competition
Club	Season	League			National cup (Note: Includes Emperors Cup)		League cup (Note: Includes J.League Cup)		Total	
Club	Season	Division	Apps	Goals	Apps	Goals	Apps	Goals	Apps	Goals
Albirex Niigata	2020	J2 League	21	0	0	0	0	0	21	0
Albirex Niigata	2021	J2 League	2	0	0	0	0	0	2	0
Albirex Niigata	2025	J1 League	16	0	0	0	1	0	17	0
Albirex Niigata	Total		39	0	0	0	1	0	40	0
Tochigi City (loan)	2022	J2 League	7	0	3	0	–		10	0
Tochigi City (loan)	2023	J2 League	32	0	1	0	–		33	0
Tochigi City (loan)	Total		39	0	4	0	0	0	43	0
JEF United Chiba (loan)	2024	J2 League	24	0	1	0	–		25	0
Avispa Fukuoka	2026	J1 (100)	6	0	–		–		6	0
Career total			108	0	5	0	1	0	114	0
