= Akihiro =

- Gender: Male

Origin
- Origin: Japanese
- Meaning: Different meanings depending on the hiragana & kanji used

Akihiro (written: あきひろ, 昭博, 昭宏, 昭大, 晶大, 昭裕, 明博, 明宏, 明弘, 明広, 晃博, 晃大, 聡寛, 彰宏, 彰洋, 晶洋, 暁洋, 顕弘, 章博, 章広, 観弘 or 彰弘) is a masculine Japanese given name. Notable people with the name include:

- Akihiro Asai (born 1975), Japanese racing driver
- Akihiro Endō (遠藤 彰弘; born 1975), Japanese footballer
- Akihiro Fukatsu (深津 旭弘; born 1987), Japanese volleyball player
- Akihiro Gono (郷野 聡寛; born 1974), Japanese mixed martial artist
- Akihiro Hakumura (白村 明弘; born 1991), Japanese baseball player
- Akihiro Hayashi (林 彰洋; born 1987), Japanese footballer
- Akihiro Higashide (東出 輝裕; born 1980), Japanese baseball player and coach
- Akihiro Higuchi, Ukrainian-born film director known by his alias Higuchinsky
- Akihiro Hino (日野 晃博; born 1968), Japanese video game designer and businessman
- Akihiro Hyodo (兵働 昭弘; born 1982), Japanese footballer
- Akihiro Ida (井田 明宏; born 1996), Japanese shogi player
- Akihiro Ienaga (家長 昭博; born 1986), Japanese footballer
- Akihiro Ito (伊藤 明弘), Japanese manga artist
- Akihiro Iwashima (岩島 章博; born 1959), Japanese volleyball player
- Akihiro Kanamori (金森 晶洋; born 1948), Japanese-born American mathematician
- Akihiro Kaneko (金子晃大; born 1997), Japanese kickboxer
- Akihiro Kasamatsu (笠松 昭宏; born 1976), Japanese artistic gymnast
- Akihiro Kitada (北田 暁大; born 1971), Japanese sociologist and associate professor
- Akihiro Kitamura (北村 昭博; born 1979), Japanese actor and director
- Akihiro Koike (小池 明広; born 1962), Japanese rower
- Akihiro Kusumi (楠見 明弘; born 1952), Japanese biologist
- Akihiro Maeda (前田 章宏; born 1983), Japanese baseball player
- Akihiro Maeta (前田 昭博; born 1954), Japanese artist
- Matsumae Akihiro (松前 章広; 1775–1833), Japanese daimyō
- Akihiro Mayama (真山 明大; born 1988), Japanese actor
- Akihiro Mera (目良明裕; born 1967), Japanese sport shooter
- Akihiro Miwa (丸山 明宏; born 1935), Japanese singer, drag queen, director, composer and writer
- Akihiro Murata (村田 顕弘; born 1986), Japanese shogi player
- Akihiro Murayama (村山 暁洋; born 1980), Japanese mixed martial artist
- Akihiro Nagakawa (永川 明広; born 1972), Japanese darts player
- Akihiro Nagashima (永島 昭浩; born 1964), Japanese footballer
- Akihiro Nakamura (中村 彰宏; born 1977), Japanese footballer
- Akihiro Nishimura (politician) (西村 明宏; born 1960), Japanese politician
- Akihiro Nishimura (footballer) (西村 昭宏; born 1958), Japanese footballer and manager
- Akihiro Noda (野田 明弘; born 1988), Japanese footballer
- Akihiro Ohata (大畠 章宏; born 1947), Japanese politician
- Akihiro Ota (太田 昭宏; born 1945), Japanese politician
- Akihiro Rinzaki (林崎 昭裕; born 1942), Japanese sport shooter
- Akihiro Sakata (阪田 章裕; born 1984), Japanese footballer
- Akihiro Sato (footballer, born August 1986) (佐藤 昭大), Japanese footballer
- Akihiro Sato (footballer, born October 1986) (佐藤 晃大), Japanese footballer
- Akihiro Sato (model) (born 1983), Japanese-Brazilian model
- Akihiro Tabata (田畑 昭宏; born 1978), Japanese footballer
- Akihiro Tabuki (田吹昭博; born 1971), Japanese baseball pitcher
- Akihiro Takada (高田 明浩; born 2002), Japanese shogi player
- Akihiro Takizawa (滝澤 明博; born 1961), Japanese biathlete
- Akihiro Togo (十河章浩; born 1967), Japanese baseball player
- Akihiro Tsukatani (塚谷 晃弘; 1919–1995), Japanese composer
- Akihiro Tsukiyama, birth name of Lee Myung-Bak, President of South Korea
- Akihiro Yamada (山田 章博; born 1957), Japanese illustrator and manga artist
- Akihiro Yamaguchi (山口 観弘; born 1994), Japanese swimmer
- Akihiro Yamauchi (山内 晶大; born 1993), Japanese volleyball player
- Akihiro Yanase (柳瀬 明宏; born 1983), Japanese baseball player
- Akihiro Yano (矢野 燿大; born 1968), Japanese baseball player
- Akihiro Yasui (安井 章泰; born 1977), Japanese sprinter
- Akihiro Yoshida (吉田 明博; born 1975), Japanese footballer

== Fictional characters ==
- Akihiro Kurata, a character in the anime series Digimon Data Squad
- Akihiro, also named Daken, a character in Marvel Comics
- Akihiro Okada, a Boss from Shadow Fight 3

== See also ==
- 5355 Akihiro, a main-belt asteroid
- 明宏 (disambiguation)
- 明博 (disambiguation)
