= Riamu Sera =

Japanese kickboxer

Riamu
- Born: Riamu Sera 瀬良 璃明武; October 7, 2000 (age 26); Sayama, Saitama, Japan
- Height: 170 cm (5 ft 7 in)
- Weight: 55 kg (121 lb; 8.7 st)
- Division: Flyweight
- Style: Kyokushin, Kickboxing
- Stance: Orthodox
- Fighting out of: Tokyo, Japan
- Team: K-1 Gym Sohonbu Team Pegasus
- Years active: 2018 - present

Kickboxing record
- Total: 22
- Wins: 17
- By knockout: 6
- Losses: 5
- By knockout: 1

Riamu Sera (瀬良 璃明武, Sera Riamu; born July 10, 2000), popularly known as Riamu is a Japanese kickboxer, currently competing in the super bantamweight division of K-1 where he is the reigning K-1 Super Bantamweight Champion

As of August 2021 he was the #8 ranked Flyweight in the world by Combat Press.

== Kickboxing career ==
=== Krush ===
==== Early career ====
Riamu was scheduled to make his professional debut against Hiroaki Shinohara at Krush.87 on April 22, 2018. He won the fight by a first-round technical knockout.

Riamu was scheduled to face Kosuke at KHAOS.7 on November 17, 2018. He won the fight by a first-round technical knockout, dropping Kosuke with several well place knees and hooks.

Riamu was scheduled to make his K-1 debut against Lyra in the preliminary portion of the K-1 WORLD GP 2019 JAPAN ～K'FESTA.2～ on March 10, 2019. He won the fight by majority decision, with scores of 29–28, 29–29 and 30–29.

==== Move up to super bantamweight ====
Riamu was scheduled to face Akihiro at Krush.104 on August 31, 2019. He moved up to super bantamweight (55 kg) for this bout, a two kilogram increase from his previous fights. Riamu won the fight by unanimous decision, with scores of 30–27, 30–28 and 29–28.

Riamu was scheduled to face Sho Uchida at K-1 KRUSH FIGHT 109 on December 15, 2019. He won the fight by a sensational first-round spinning back kick knockout.

Riamu was scheduled to make his second K-1 appearance against Ryuto on March 22, 2020, on the preliminary portion of the K'Festa 3 card. He won the fight by unanimous decision.

Riamu was expected to face Aoshi at Krush 113 on June 28, 2020. However, on June 7, it was announced that Riamu withdrew from the bout due to injury.

Riamu was scheduled to face the former Krush Bantamweight titleholder Junki Sasaki at K-1 World GP 2020 Winter's Crucial Bout on December 13, 2020. Sasaki won the fight by unanimous decision, with scores of 29–27, 30–26 and 30–26, thus handing Riamu his first professional loss. Riamu was deducted a point in the first round for holding Sasaki down.

Riamu was scheduled to face Aoshi at Krush 122 on February 27, 2021. They were expected to fight at Krush 113 on June 28, 2020, before Riamu withdrew from the bout. Riamu won the fight by unanimous decision, with all three judges scoring the fight 30–27 in his favor.

=== Krush Super Bantamweight champion ===
==== Krush Super Bantamweight tournament ====
Riamu participated in the 2021 Krush Super Bantamweight tournament, held to crown the new champion. Riamu was scheduled to face the former Krush Bantamweight champion Begin Yoshioka in the tournament quarterfinals, held at Krush 128 on August 21, 2021. Yoshioka failed to make weight for the fight, which meant Riamu would advance to the tournament semifinals regardless of the fight result. Additionally, Yoshioka entered the fight with a one-point deduction and was forced to wear the heavier 10 oz gloves. Riamu won the fight by unanimous decision.

Riamu was scheduled to face Yuto Kuroda in the tournament semifinals, held at Krush 130 on October 31, 2021. He won the fight by unanimous decision, with all three judges awarding him a 30-28 scorecard. Although the first and third rounds were scored as a draw, the knockdown Riamu scored near the end of the second round was enough to earn him the victory. Riamu faced Momotaro Kiyama in the tournament finals. After a slow first round, Riamu upped the pace midway through the second round and dropped Kiyama with a right hook. This was quickly followed by a second knockdown with a left hook, before the referee stopped the fight at the very end of the second round.

==== K-1 super bantamweight tournament ====
During a press conference held on December 21, 2021, it was announced by K-1 that Riamu would participate in the 2022 Super Bantamweight World Grand Prix, which would be held at K-1 World GP 2022 Japan on February 27, 2022. Riamu faced Ikko in the tournament quarterfinals. He won the fight by a narrow unanimous decision, with all three judges scoring the bout 30–29 in his favor. Sera lost his semifinal bout against Akihiro Kaneko by a second-round technical knockout, as he was knocked down twice in the opening round, which resulted in a stoppage victory for Kaneko per the tournament rules.

==== Krush title reign ====
Riamu faced the two-time Rajadamnern Stadium title challenger Mutsuki Ebata at The Match 2022 on June 19, 2022. He lost the fight by an extra round split decision, with scores of 9–10, 9–10 and 10–9.

Riamu was expected to make his first Krush Super Bantamweight Championship defense against Lyra Nagasaki in the main event of Krush 143 on November 26, 2022. He withdrew from the fight on November 21, after suffering a metacarpal fracture of his right ring finger. The title bout was rescheduled for Krush 151, which took place on July 22, 2023. He won the fight by unanimous decision, with two scorecards of 30–28 and one scorecard of 30–27.

Riamu was expected to face Luca Cecchetti in the quarterfinals of the K-1 super bantamweight tournament at K-1 World MAX 2024 - World Championship Tournament Final on July 7, 2024. Cecchetti withdrew from the bout on June 12, due to a toren left thigh adductor muscle, and was replaced by Angelos Martinos. Riamu won the fight by technical knockout, as he stopped Martinos with low kicks 20 seconds into the extension round. He faced the K-1 World GP Super Bantamweight champion Akihiro Kaneko in the semifinals at K-1 World MAX 2024 on September 29, 2024. He lost the fight by majority decision, with scores of 30–29, 30–29 and 29–29. Riamu was deducted a point in the final round for repeated clinching.

== Titles and accomplishments ==
=== Kickboxing ===
Professional

- K-1
  - 2026 K-1 World GP Super Bantamweight (-55kg) Champion
- Krush
  - 2021 Krush Super Bantamweight (-55 kg) Champion
    - Four successful title defenses
  - 2025 Krush Fighter of the Year

Amateur

- 2017 K-1 Challenge A-class -55 kg Tournament Winner & event MVP

=== Karate ===
- 2015 IBKO All Japan U-15 -55 kg Winner

== Fight record ==
Professional Kickboxing Record
18 Wins (6 (T)KO's), 5 Losses, 0 Draw, 0 No Contest
Date	Result	Opponent	Event	Location	Method	Round	Time
2027-02-11		TBA	K-1 World GP 2027 -90kg Tournament Final 16	Tokyo, Japan			
Defending the K-1 Super Bantamweight Championship.
2026-09-12	Win	(Japan) Akihiro Kaneko	K-1 World MAX 2026 - World Tournament Opening Round	Tokyo, Japan	Ext.R Decision (Split)	4	3:00
Wins the K-1 Super Bantamweight Championship.
2026-05-31	Win	(Japan) Riku Otsu	K-1 Revenge	Tokyo, Japan	Decision (Unanimous)	3	3:00
2025-11-29	Win	(Japan) Kengo Murata	Krush 182	Tokyo, Japan	Decision (Unanimous)	3	3:00
Defends the Krush Super Bantamweight (-55kg) title.
2025-03-30	Win	(Japan) Koji Ikeda	Krush 172	Tokyo, Japan	Ext.R Decision (Unanimous)	4	3:00
Defends the Krush Super Bantamweight (-55kg) title.
2024-12-14	Loss	(Japan) Rui Okubo	K-1 World Grand Prix 2024 Final	Tokyo, Japan	Decision (Unanimous)	3	3:00
2024-09-29	Loss	(Japan) Akihiro Kaneko	K-1 World MAX 2024 - 55 kg World Tournament, Semifinals	Tokyo, Japan	Decision (Majority)	3	3:00
2024-07-07	Win	(Greece) Angelos Martinos	K-1 World MAX 2024 - 55 kg World Tournament, Quarterfinals	Tokyo, Japan	TKO (low kicks)	4	0:20
2024-03-30	Win	(Japan) Eiki Kurata	Krush 159	Tokyo, Japan	KO (Left hook)	1	1:54
Defends the Krush Super Bantamweight (-55kg) title.
2023-07-22	Win	(Japan) Lyra Nagasaka	Krush 151	Tokyo, Japan	Decision (Unanimous)	3	3:00
Defends the Krush Super Bantamweight (-55kg) title.
2022-06-19	Loss	(Japan) Mutsuki Ebata	THE MATCH 2022	Tokyo, Japan	Ext.R Decision (Split)	4	3:00
2022-02-27	Loss	(Japan) Akihiro Kaneko	K-1 World GP 2022 Japan, Super Bantamweight GP Semi Finals	Tokyo, Japan	TKO (2 Knockdown/Low kick)	2	2:23
2022-02-27	Win	(Japan) Ikko Ota	K-1 World GP 2022 Japan, Super Bantamweight World GP Quarter Finals	Tokyo, Japan	Decision (Unanimous)	3	3:00
2021-10-31	Win	(Japan) Momotaro Kiyama	Krush 130, -55 kg Championship Tournament Final	Tokyo, Japan	TKO (3 Knockdowns/punches)	2	3:00
Wins the vacant Krush Super Bantamweight (-55kg) title.
2021-10-31	Win	(Japan) Yuto Kuroda	Krush 130, -55 kg Championship Tournament Semi Finals	Tokyo, Japan	Decision (Unanimous)	3	3:00
2021-08-21	Win	(Japan) Begin Yoshioka	Krush 128, -55 kg Championship Tournament Quarter Finals	Tokyo, Japan	Decision (Unanimous)	3	3:00
2021-02-27	Win	(Japan) Aoshi Kitano	Krush 122	Tokyo, Japan	Decision (Unanimous)	3	3:00
2020-12-13	Loss	(Japan) Junki Sasaki	K-1 World GP 2020 Winter's Crucial Bout	Tokyo, Japan	Decision (Unanimous)	3	3:00
2020-03-22	Win	(Japan) Ryuto	K'Festa 3	Saitama, Japan	Decision (Unanimous)	3	3:00
2019-12-15	Win	(Japan) Sho Uchida	Krush.109	Tokyo, Japan	KO (Spinning Back Kick)	1	1:32
2019-08-31	Win	(Japan) Akihiro	Krush.104	Tokyo, Japan	Decision (Unanimous)	3	3:00
2019-03-10	Win	(Japan) Lyra Nagasaka	K-1 WORLD GP 2019 JAPAN ～K'FESTA.2～	Saitama, Japan	Decision (Majority)	3	3:00
2018-11-17	Win	(Japan) Kosuke	KHAOS.7	Tokyo, Japan	TKO (Punches & Knees)	1	0:59
2018-04-22	Win	(Japan) Hiroaki Shinohara	Krush.87	Tokyo, Japan	TKO (Punches)	1	1:05
Legend: Win Loss Draw/No contest Notes

=== Amateur record ===
Amateur Kickboxing Record
Date	Result	Opponent	Event	Location	Method	Round	Time
2017-10-22	Win	(Japan) Shino Ishibashi	K-1 Amateur Challenge A-class -55 kg Tournament, Final	Tokyo, Japan	Decision (Unanimous)	1	2:00
2017-10-22	Win	(Japan) Aoi Noda	K-1 Amateur Challenge A-class -55 kg Tournament, Semi Final	Tokyo, Japan	Ext.R Decision (Split)	2	2:00
2017-10-22	Win	(Japan) Yuya Kitahara	K-1 Amateur Challenge A-class -55 kg Tournament, Quarter Final	Tokyo, Japan	KO	1	
2017-09-03	Loss	(Japan) Tsutomu Aoki	K-1 Amateur Challenge A-class -55 kg Tournament, Semi Final	Tokyo, Japan	Decision (Majority)	1	2:00
2017-09-03	Win	(Japan) Tomoya Kawashima	K-1 Amateur Challenge A-class -55 kg Tournament, Quarter Final	Tokyo, Japan	KO	1	
2017-06-25	Loss	(Japan) Jukiya Ito	K-1 Amateur Challenge A-class -55 kg Tournament, Quarter Final	Tokyo, Japan	Decision (Unanimous)	1	2:00
2017-04-29	Loss	(Japan) Toki Tamaru	K-1 Amateur Challenge A-class -55 kg Tournament, Semi Final	Tokyo, Japan	Decision (Unanimous)	1	2:00
2017-04-29	Win	(Japan) Daiki Nishimura	K-1 Amateur Challenge A-class -55 kg Tournament, Quarter Final	Tokyo, Japan	KO	1	
2017-03-26	Loss	(Japan) Yuya Hashimoto	K-1 Amateur Challenge A-class -55 kg Tournament, Quarter Final	Tokyo, Japan	Ext.R Decision (Split)	2	2:00
2016-10-23	Win	(Japan) Rikiya Yamaura	K-1 Amateur Challenge B-class -55 kg Tournament, Final	Tokyo, Japan	Decision (Split)	2	2:00
2016-10-23	Win	(Japan) Kosuke Fukuma	K-1 Amateur Challenge B-class -55 kg Tournament, Semi Final	Tokyo, Japan	Decision (Unanimous)	2	2:00
2016-07-30	Loss	(Japan) Tomoya Yokoyama	K-1 Koshien 2016 –55 kg Tournament, First Round	Tokyo, Japan	Decision (Unanimous)	1	2:00
2016-03-27	Loss	(Japan) Kyosuke Yamaguchi	K-1 Amateur Junior B-class -55 kg	Tokyo, Japan	Decision (Unanimous)	1	2:00
2016-03-27	Win	(Japan) Riku Fujishiro	K-1 Amateur Junior B-class -55 kg	Tokyo, Japan	KO	1	1:24
Legend: Win Loss Draw/No contest Notes

== See also ==
- List of male kickboxers
