= Antonio Orden =

Spanish muay thai fighter

- Born: October 14, 1991 (age 35); Madrid, Spain
- Other names: El Zurdo
- Height: 1.72 m (5 ft 7 1/2 in)
- Weight: 56 kg (123 lb; 8.8 st)
- Style: Muay Thai
- Stance: Southpaw
- Fighting out of: Madrid, Spain
- Team: El Origen Thaimartin/Orden Team

Kickboxing record
- Total: 40
- Wins: 31
- By knockout: 6
- Losses: 8
- By knockout: 3
- Draws: 1

Antonio Orden is a Spanish Muay Thai fighter and kickboxer. He is the current WBC Muaythai featherweight world champion.

As of November 2023 he was the #1 ranked 126 lbs muay thai fighter in the world by Combat Press.

== Career ==
Orden captured his first regional professional title on November 28, 2016, when he defeated Roman Skulskyi by decision at Invencibles VI for the vacant WKA Muay Thai European featherweight title.

Orden faced Shogo Kuriaki at Road to Strikers League Madrid for the vacant WKA Muay Thai Intercontinental title on March 11, 2017. He won the fight by decision.

Orden took part in the 2017 K-1 World GP Super Bantamweight (-55 kg) World Grand Prix, which was held on April 22, 2017. He was scheduled to face Yoshiki Takei in the quarterfinals of the one-day tournament. He lost the fight by a third-round technical knockout after being counted twice.

On October 7, 2017, Orden faced ISKA World champion Jamie Whelan at Fight Club SLAM in Madrid, Spain. He won the fight by decision.

On October 6, 2018, Orden faced former Thailand champion Chamlagphet Phan at Enfusion Live 72 in Madrid, Spain for the vacant IPCC K-1 Intercontinental -57 kg title. He won the fight by fourth-round knockout with a straight to the body.

Orden defeated Vladislav Kunik by fifth round stoppage for the vacant GBF K-1 World title on May 11, 2019.

Orden rematched Kevin Vidal at Extreme Fighters on September 1, 2019. He won the fight by decision.

Orden was scheduled to face Francesco Stogiu for the vacant WBC Muaythai Mediterranean title at the Hearts on Fire event on December 12, 2021, in Madrid, Spain. He won the fight by first-round knockout with a knee to the body.

On July 2, 2022, Orden faced Samb M'Baye for the vacant WBC Muaythai International featherweight title. He won the fight by unanimous decision.

Orden faced Noelisson Silva on February 4, 2023, for the vacant WBC Muaythai Featherweight world title. He won the fight by unanimous decision after five round to become the new champion.

Orden was scheduled to make his ONE Championship promotion debut at ONE Friday Fights 36 against Pongsiri Sor.Jor.Wichitpadriew on October 6, 2023. He won the fight by split decision after scoring a knockdown.

Orden was scheduled to make the first defense of his WBC Muaythai world title on March 2, 2024, against Nicolas Christou at Extreme Fighters. He won the fight by unanimous decision.

Orden was scheduled to make his return to K-1 on July 7, 2024, in Tokyo, Japan at K-1 World MAX 2024 - World Championship Tournament Final where he would face Masashi Kumura in the quarterfinals of a -55 kg world tournament.

== Titles and accomplishments ==
- World Kickboxing Association
  - 2014 WKA Muay Thai Spain Amateur Featherweight Champion
  - 2015 WKA Muay Thai Spain Featherweight Champion
  - 2016 WKA Muay Thai European Featherweight Champion
- International Sport Kickboxing Association
  - 2017 ISKA Muay Thai Intercontinental Champion
  - 2026 interim ISKA Muay Thai World Featherweight Champion
- International Professional Combat Council
  - 2018 IPCC K-1 Intercontinental -57 kg Champion
- Mamba Fight Club
  - 2023 MFC Muay Thai World -60 kg Champion
- World Boxing Council Muaythai
  - 2021 WBC Muaythai Mediterranean Featherweight Champion
  - 2022 WBC Muaythai International Featherweight Champion
  - 2023 WBC Muaythai World Featherweight Champion
    - One successful title defense
  - 2026 WBC Muaythai World Featherweight Champion

== Fight record ==
Professional Muay Thai and Kickboxing Record
31 Wins (6 (T)KO's), 8 Losses, 1 Draw
Date	Result	Opponent	Event	Location	Method	Round	Time
2026-12-12		(England) Owen Gillis	Noche De Leyendas 5	Madrid, Spain			
2026-10-03	Win	(Italy) Nabil Tassa	EXF x YOKKAO	Madrid, Spain	Decision (Unanimous)	5	3:00
Wins the interim ISKA Muaythai World Featherweight title.
2026-02-22	Win	(Japan) Takuma Ota	Extreme Fighters	Madrid, Spain	Decision (Unanimous)	5	3:00
Wins the WBC Muaythai World Featherweight title.
2025-06-08	Loss	(Japan) Takuma Ota	NJKF King of Challenger	Tokyo, Japan	KO (Body kick)	3	1:49
Loses the WBC Muaythai World Featherweight title.
2025-03-15	Loss	(England) Owen Gillis	Extreme Fighters	Madrid, Spain	Decision	5	3:00
For the vacant WMO World Featherweight title.
2025-02-22	Win	(Morocco) Yassin El Khoulati	Extreme Fighters	Madrid, Spain	TKO	4	
Wins the Extreme Fighters title.
2024-07-07	Loss	(Japan) Masashi Kumura	K-1 World MAX 2024 - World Championship Tournament Final	Tokyo, Japan	KO (Left hook)	1	0:55
K-1 World -55kg Tournament Quarterfinals.
2024-03-02	Win	(Cyprus) Nicolas Christou	Extreme Fighters	Madrid, Spain	Decision (Unanimous)	5	3:00
Defends the WBC Muaythai World Featherweight title.
2023-10-06	Win	(Thailand) Pongsiri Sor.Jor.Wichitpadriew	ONE Friday Fights 36, Lumpinee Stadium	Bangkok, Thailand	Decision (Split)	3	3:00
2023-08-05	Win	(Spain) Juan Mario	MFC Showdown 032	Ponferrada, Spain	Decision (Split)	3	3:00
Wins the MFC Muay Thai -60kg title.
2023-02-04	Win	(Brazil) Noelisson Silva	Extreme Fighters	Madrid, Spain	Decision (Unanimous)	5	3:00
Wins the vacant WBC Muaythai World Featherweight title.
2022-07-02	Win	(France) Samb M’Baye	Extreme Fighters Coliseum	Madrid, Spain	Decision (Unanimous)	5	3:00
Wins the vacant WBC Muay Thai International Featherweight title.
2022-04-16	Win	(Spain) Eduard Esmerlin	Extreme Fighters vol.4	Alcobendas, Spain	Decision (Unanimous)	3	3:00
2022-02-05	Win	(Italy) Giordano Stella	HMF Custom Fighters	Madrid, Spain	Decision	3	3:00
2021-12-12	Win	(Italy) Francesco Sotgiu	Hearts on Fire	Madrid, Spain	KO (Knee to the body)	1	
Wins the vacant WBC Muaythai Mediterranean Featherweight title.
2021-06-05	Win	(Portugal) Nuno Furtado	MFC Showdown 012	Ponferrada, Spain	Decision	3	3:00
2020-10-31	Loss	(Spain) Isaac Araya	SLAM Arena 4	Las Palmas de Gran Canaria, Spain	Decision	3	3:00
2019-09-01	Win	(Spain) Kevin Vidal	Extreme Fighters	Madrid, Spain	KO	1	
Wins the Extreme Fighters Muay Thai title.
2019-05-11	Win	(Ukraine) Vladislav Kunik		Pozuelo de Alarcón, Spain	TKO	5	
Wins the GBF K-1 World title.
2019-03-09	Draw	(Spain) Kevin Martinez	Lion Fighters 11	Cabanillas del Campo, Spain	Decision	3	3:00
2018-10-06	Win	(Thailand) Chamlagphet Phan	Enfusion Live #72	Madrid, Spain	KO (Straight to the body)	4	
Wins the vacant IPCC K-1 Intercontinental -57kg title.
2018-02-17	Win	(Spain) Gonzalo Tebar	La Noche de las Batallas	Fuente el Saz de Jarama, Spain	Decision (Unanimous)	3	3:00
2017-11-11	Win	(China) Xu luzhe	Strikers League	Madrid, Spain	Decision (Unanimous)	3	3:00
Wins the Strikers League World -57kg title.
2017-10-07	Win	(United Kingdom) Jamie Whelan	Fight Club SLAM	Madrid, Spain	Decision	3	3:00
2017-07-28	Loss	(Thailand) Jacky PhuketTopTeam	Bangla Boxing Stadium	Phuket, Thailand	Decision	3	3:00
2017-04-22	Loss	(Japan) Yoshiki Takei	K-1 World GP 2017: Super Bantamweight Tournament, QuarterFinals	Tokyo, Japan	TKO (Two knockdowns)	3	2:31
2017-03-11	Win	(Japan) Shogo Kuriaki	Road to Strikers League Madrid	Madrid, Spain	Decision	5	3:00
Wins the ISKA Muay Thai Intercontinental title.
2017-01-28	Win	(Portugal) Victor Helder	Road to Strikers League	Madrid, Spain	Decision (Unanimous)	3	3:00
2016-11-28	Win	(Ukraine) Roman Skulskyi	Invencibles VI	Madrid, Spain	Decision (Unanimous)	5	3:00
Wins the WKA Muay Thai European Featherweight title.
2016-10-08	Win	(Spain) Nestor Rodriguez	Enfusion Live #42	Madrid, Spain	Decision	3	3:00
2016-06-04	Win	(Spain) Miguel Cascales	La Noche de las Batallas IV	Madrid, Spain	KO (Punches)	1	
Wins the HMF Muay Thai Spain -58kg title.
2015-12-19	Win	(Spain) Jaime Roldan	Invencibles V	Madrid, Spain	Decision (Unanimous)	3	3:00
Wins the WKA Muay Thai Spain Featherweight title.
2015-11-14	Loss	(Spain) Kevin Vidal	Warriors Night Tenerife	Tenerife, Spain	Decision	3	3:00
2015-10-17	Loss	(Spain) Kevin Martinez	World Fight Tour Madrid	Madrid, Spain	Decision	5	3:00
2015-05-30	Win	(Spain) Javier Lantaron	Invencibles IV	Madrid, Spain	Decision (Unanimous)	3	3:00
2015-02-21	Win	(Italy) Antonio Albo	Ultra Elite Fighters	Torrejón de Ardoz, Spain	Decision (Unanimous)	3	3:00
2014-10-18	Win	(Spain) Oscar Crespo	HMF	Spain	Decision (Unanimous)	3	3:00
2014-03-15	Win	(Spain) Abdul Abdellah	HMF Tournament, Final	Madrid, Spain	Decision (Unanimous)	3	3:00
2014-03-15	Win	(Spain) Alex barroso	HMF Tournament, Semifinal	Madrid, Spain	Decision (Unanimous)	3	3:00
2013-12-19	Win	(Spain) Pedro Solano	Muay Combat	Toledo, Spain	Decision (Unanimous)	3	3:00
Legend: Win Loss Draw/No contest Notes

== See also ==
- List of male kickboxers
