= Masashi Kumura =

Japanese kickboxer

- Born: 玖村 将史; January 8, 1999 (age 27); Sakai, Japan
- Height: 168 cm (5 ft 6 in)
- Weight: 55.0 kg (121.3 lb; 8.66 st)
- Division: Flyweight
- Style: Kickboxing
- Stance: Orthodox
- Fighting out of: Tokyo, Japan
- Team: NJKF / K3B (2014-2017); K-1 Gym Gotanda Team Kings (2018-2025); 999 (2025-present)
- Years active: 2014 - present

Kickboxing record
- Total: 35
- Wins: 27
- By knockout: 14
- Losses: 8
- By knockout: 2

Other information
- Notable relatives: Shuhei Kumura (brother)
- Website: https://kumuramasashi-official.com/

Masashi Kumura (Japanese: 玖村 将史, Kumura Masashi; born January 8, 1999) is a Japanese kickboxer, currently competing in the super bantamweight division of K-1. He is the former Krush Super Bantamweight champion, having held the title between 2019 and 2021. Kumura is a two-time K-1 World Grand Prix finalist, having finished as the runner-up in the 2019 and 2022 super bantamweight tournaments.

As of August 2023, he is ranked as the second best flyweight (-56.7 kg) kickboxer in the world by Combat Press and the second best super flyweight (-55 kg) kickboxer by Beyond Kickboxing. He's been ranked in the flyweight top ten since September 2020. He was previously ranked in the strawweight top ten by Combat Press from May 2019, until August 2020.

== Kickboxing career ==
=== Early career ===
Kumura made his professional debut at NJKF IGOSSO REBORN 2014, when he was scheduled to fight Kyosuke Nishida. He beat Nishida by unanimous decision. Kumura won his next four fights by stoppage, beating Yamashita "Spankey" Hiroshi by a second-round knockout and scoring first-round knockouts of Masato Ooba, Teishi and Yuto Kuroda. His five fight winning streak was snapped by Yoshiho Tane, who beat Kumura by split decision. Kumura lost his next fight as well, suffering a second-round knockout at the hands of Koudai Hirayama.

Kumura made his Krush debut against Kazuki Okawa at Krush 84. Kumura won the fight by technical knockout, knocking Okawa down three times inside of the first round. He scored the first and third knockdown with a left hook, while he scored the second knockdown with a head kick.

Kumura was scheduled to fight the future K-1 Featherweight champion Tatsuya Tsubakihara at Krush 86. Kumura thoroughly dominated the future champion, winning the fight by unanimous decision, with all three judges awarding him a 30-26 scorecard.

For his third fight with the organization, Kumura was scheduled to fight the experienced journeyman Yusho Kanemoto at Krush 89. Kumura edged all thee rounds of the bout on his way to winning a unanimous decision.

=== Krush Super Bantamweight champion ===
==== Krush Super Bantamweight tournament ====
Kumura was scheduled to fight Shota Oiwa at Krush 94, in a Krush Super Bantamweight tournament quarterfinal. Kumura won the fight by knockout, knocking Oiwa down with a left-hook midway through the first round, which left him unable to beat the eight-count. Advancing to the semifinals, Kumura faced Victor Saravia. Following a back-and-forth three rounds, the fight was ruled a draw. One judge awarded a 29-28 scorecard to Kumura, the second judge awarded the same scorecard to Saravia, while the third judge scored the fight as a 29-29 draw. The fight went into an extra round, after which Kumura won a unanimous decision.

Kumura was scheduled to fight the former Krush Super Bantamweight champion Taito Gunji for the vacant Krush championship, in a Krush super bantamweight tournament final. Gunji had lost the title to Akihiro Kaneko, who later vacated it. Since his loss to Kaneko, Gunji rebounded with back-to-back victories, while Kumura came into the fight with a perfect 5-0 record with K-1. Kumura won the fight by unanimous decision, with two judges awarding him a 30-28 scorecard, while the third judge scored it 30-29 in Kumura's favor.

==== K-1 Super Bantamweight Grand Prix ====
Kumura participated in the 2019 K-1 Super Bantamweight Grand Prix. He was scheduled to fight the 2019 Rajadamnern Stadium 126 lbs champion Phetpangan Mor.Ratanabandit in the quarterfinals. Kumura beat Phetpangan with a first-round technical knockout, managing to knock his opponent down twice inside of the first round. The first knockdown came as a result of a right-straight counter to Phetpangan's front kick, while the second knockdown came as a result of a right hook. Advancing to the semifinals, Kumura beat Samvel Babayan by unanimous decision, and faced the reigning K-1 Super Bantamweight champion Yoshiki Takei in the finals. Takei won the fight by knockout, stopping Kumura with a right-straight 38 seconds into the second round.

==== Kumura vs. Hayashi, Kaneko ====
Kumura was scheduled to make his first title defense against Yuta Hayashi. Kumura was initially supposed to fight Akihiro Kaneko, however, Kaneko declined the fight. Kumura successfully defended his title with a majority decision victory, with two of the judges scoring the bout 29-28 in his favor.

Kumura was scheduled to fight a non-title bout with the undefeated Akihiro Kaneko at K’Festa 3. Kaneko was initially supposed to challenge for Kumura's Krush title at Krush 108, but had refused the fight. Kaneko previously fought and beat Masashi's brother Shuhei Kumura by an extra round decision at K’FESTA 2. Kumura won the tightly contested affair through a majority decision. One of the judges scored the fight as a draw, the second judge scored the fight 20-20 after the first two rounds and awarded Kumura the last round, while the third judge scored the fight 30-28 in Kumura's favor.

==== Kumura vs. Gunji II ====
For his second title defense, Kumura was scheduled to fight a rematch with the former Krush Super Bantamweight champion Taito Gunji at Krush 117. The two of them previously fought for the vacant title at Krush 98, with Kumura winning by unanimous decision. Throughout the first two rounds of the fight, Kumura kept distance and accumulated damage with a mixture of a jab-right hook combination. In the third round, Kumura managed to knock Gunji down with a knee to the head, as Gunji was ducking out from an exchange. Kumura won the fight through a unanimous decision, with all three judges awarding him a 30-27 scorecard. After the fight, Kumura called for a rematch with the reigning K-1 Super Bantamweight champion Yoshiki Takei.

==== Kumura vs. Daosakorn ====
Kumura was scheduled to fight Dansiam Ayothaya Fight Gym at K-1: K’Festa 4. The fight was part of a five-against-five Japan vs Thailand theme. The fight with Dansiam was later scrapped, as the entire event was postponed due to a worsening COVID-19 situation in Japan. Kumura was rescheduled to fight the former WPMF World super bantamweight champion Daosakorn Mor.Tassanai at K’Festa 4 Day.2. Before the fight itself, Kumura stated his desire to fight for the K-1 Super Bantamweight title, which was vacated by Yoshiki Takei. Following a back-and-forth first round, Kumura scored a knockout mid-way through the second round, countering Daosakorn's left hook with a right cross. During his post-fight speech, Kumura reiterated his desire to fight for the vacant K-1 super bantamweight title and stated his desire to fight at featherweight as well. On July 9, 2021, at the press conference for the Krush 128 fight card, K-1 producer Takumi Nakamura announced that Kumura had officially relinquished the Krush Super Bantamweight title.

=== K-1 ===
==== K-1 Super Bantamweight Grand Prix ====
Kumura was scheduled to take part in the 2022 K-1 Super Bantamweight World Grand Prix, which was held at K-1 World GP 2022 Japan on February 27, 2022. He faced Momotaro Kiyama in the tournament quarterfinals. He made quick work of Kiyama, stopping him with a lead leg body kick 84 seconds into the opening round. Kumura next faced the former Krush Bantamweight champion Junki Sasaki in the penultimate bout of the tournament. Kumura made quick work of Sasaki, as he knocked him down twice by the 1:37 minute mark of the opening round, which resulted in an automatic technical knockout victory for him.

Kumura advanced to the tournament finals, where he faced the former Krush Super Bantamweight champion Akihiro Kaneko. The fight was a rematch of their March 22, 2020 bout, which Kumura won by a close majority decision. Kumura lost the rematch by majority decision. He suffered a knockdown in the second round, following a close first round, which proved the pivotal moment of the fight.

==== Continued super bantamweight career ====
Kumura was booked to face the 2019 RISE World Series featherweight tournament runner-up and the 2020 RISE Dead or Alive super bantamweight tournament winner Shiro on the undercard of The Match 2022 pay per view event, held on June 19, 2022. He won the fight by unanimous decision, with scores of 29–28, 30–28 and 30–28. He scored to sole knockdown of the fight in near the end of the second round, flooring Shiro with a right hook. This proved the decisive moment of the fight, as two of the three judges scored both the first and the third round as a draw, while the third judge awarded the first round to Shiro.

At a K-1 press conference held on June 29, 2022, it was announced that Kumura would fight at K-1 World GP 2022 Yokohamatsuri on September 11, 2022. At a second press conference, held a month later, it was revealed that Kumura would face the two-weight Lumpinee Stadium and three-weight Channel 7 champion Kompetch Sitsarawatsuer in a 56 kg catchweight bout. He lost the fight by split decision, with one judge scoring the bout 30–29 in his favor, while the remaining two judges awarded the same scorecard to Kompetch.

Kumura faced the King of Kings flyweight champion Ismail El Kadhi at K-1 World GP 2022 in Osaka on December 3, 2022. He knocked his opponent down twice, once each in the first and second rounds, before he stopped him with a liver kick at the 1:45 minute mark of the second round. In the post-fight interview, Kumura called out the reigning K-1 super bantamweight champion Akihiro Kaneko for a fight in March of the next year.

Kumura faced the RISE Bantamweight champion Masahiko Suzuki at K-1 World GP 2023: K'Festa 6 on March 12, 2023. He won the fight by unanimous decision, with all three judges awarding him a 30–28 scorecard. Kumura knocked Suzuki down with a jab in the second round, which edged the scorecards in his favor, as the remaining two rounds of the contest were scorecard as a 10–10 draw.

Kumura challenged the K-1 Super Bantamweight titleholder Akihiro Kaneko at K-1 World GP 2023: ReBOOT～K-1 ReBIRTH～ on September 10, 2023. He lost the trilogy fight by unanimous decision, after an extension round was contested.

Kumura faced Luca Cecchetti at K-1 World MAX 2024 - World Tournament Opening Round on March 20, 2024. He won the fight by majority decision, with scores of 30–30, 30–29 and 30–29.

Kumura faced the WBC Muaythai World featherweight champion Antonio Orden in the quarterfinals of the K-1 super bantamweight tournament at K-1 World MAX 2024 - World Championship Tournament Final on July 7, 2024. He needed just 56 seconds to knock Orden out. Kumura faced the former Krush Flyweight (-51kg) champion Rui Okubo in the tournament semifinals at K-1 World MAX 2024 on September 29, 2024. He lost the fight by unanimous decision, with all three judges awarding Okubo a 30–29 scorecard.

=== RISE ===
Kumura challenged the RISE Bantamweight (-55kg) World champion Shiro in his debut with RISE at RISE World Series 2025 Tokyo on August 2, 2025. He was thrice knocked down en route to losing the fight by unanimous decision.

== Titles and accomplishments ==
- K-1
  - 2019 K-1 World GP -55 kg Championship Tournament Runner-up
  - 2022 K-1 World GP -55 kg Championship Tournament Runner-up
  - 2022 K-1 Awards "Fight of the Year" (vs. Akihiro Kaneko)
  - 2023 K-1 Awards "Fight of the Year" (vs. Masahiko Suzuki)
- Krush
  - 2019 Krush Super Bantamweight Champion
    - Two successful title defenses
- Beyond Kickboxing
  - 2023 Beyond Kickboxing "Fight of the Year" (vs. Akihiro Kaneko)

== Kickboxing record ==
Kickboxing record
26 Wins (13 (T)KO's), 8 Losses, 0 Draw, 0 No Contest
| Date | Result | Opponent | Event | Location | Method | Round | Time |
| 2026-12-20 | | (Japan) Koki Osaki | RISE World Series 2026 Tokyo Final -55kg Tournament, Quarterfinals | Tokyo, Japan | | | |
| 2026-11-18 | Win | (United Kingdom) Ellis Barboza | ONE Samurai 5 | Tokyo, Japan | TKO (referee stoppage) | 1 | 2:58 |
| 2026-09-19 | Win | (Japan) Atsuki Yamada | RISE World Series 2026 Tokyo 2 | Tokyo, Japan | Ext.R Decision (unanimous) | 4 | 3:00 |
| 2026-06-06 | Win | (Philippines) Joemar Gallaza | RISE World Series 2026 Tokyo | Tokyo, Japan | TKO (3 Knockdowns) | 1 | 1:23 |
| 2025-08-02 | Loss | (Japan) Shiro | RISE World Series 2025 Tokyo | Tokyo, Japan | Decision (Unanimous) | 5 | 3:00 |
For the RISE Bantamweight (-55kg) World title.
| 2024-09-29 | Loss | (Japan) Rui Okubo | K-1 World MAX 2024 - 55 kg World Tournament, Semifinals | Tokyo, Japan | Decision (Unanimous) | 3 | 3:00 |
| 2024-07-07 | Win | (Spain) Antonio Orden | K-1 World MAX 2024 - 55 kg World Tournament, Quarterfinals | Tokyo, Japan | KO (Left hook) | 1 | 0:56 |
| 2024-03-20 | Win | (Italy) Luca Cecchetti | K-1 World MAX 2024 - World Tournament Opening Round | Tokyo, Japan | Decision (Majority) | 3 | 3:00 |
| 2023-09-10 | Loss | (Japan) Akihiro Kaneko | K-1 World GP 2023: ReBOOT～K-1 ReBIRTH～ | Yokohama, Japan | Ext.R Decision (Unanimous) | 4 | 3:00 |
For the K-1 Super Bantamweight (-55kg) title.
| 2023-03-12 | Win | (Japan) Masahiko Suzuki | K-1 World GP 2023: K'Festa 6 | Tokyo, Japan | Decision (Unanimous) | 3 | 3:00 |
| 2022-12-03 | Win | (Cyprus) Ismail Al Kadhi | K-1 World GP 2022 in Osaka | Osaka, Japan | KO (Liver kick) | 2 | 1:45 |
| 2022-09-11 | Loss | (Thailand) Kompetch Sitsarawatsuer | K-1 World GP 2022 Yokohamatsuri | Yokohama, Japan | Decision (Split) | 3 | 3:00 |
| 2022-06-19 | Win | (Japan) Shiro | THE MATCH 2022 | Tokyo, Japan | Decision (Unanimous) | 3 | 3:00 |
| 2022-02-27 | Loss | (Japan) Akihiro Kaneko | K-1 World GP 2022 Japan - Super Bantamweight Tournament, Final | Tokyo, Japan | Decision (Majority) | 3 | 3:00 |
For the 2022 K-1 Super Bantamweight Japan Tournament title and the vacant K-1 Super Bantamweight (-55kg) title.
| 2022-02-27 | Win | (Japan) Junki Sasaki | K-1 World GP 2022 Japan - Super Bantamweight Tournament Semifinals | Tokyo, Japan | TKO (2 Knockdowns/Punches) | 1 | 1:37 |
| 2022-02-27 | Win | (Japan) Momotaro Kiyama | K-1 World GP 2022 Japan - Super Bantamweight Tournament Quarterfinals | Tokyo, Japan | KO (Left kick to the body) | 1 | 1:24 |
| 2021-03-28 | Win | (Thailand) Daosakorn Mor.Tassanai | K-1 World GP 2021: K’Festa 4 Day.2 | Tokyo, Japan | KO (Right cross) | 2 | 1:56 |
| 2020-09-26 | Win | (Japan) Taito Gunji | Krush.117 | Tokyo, Japan | Decision (Unanimous) | 3 | 3:00 |
Defends the Krush Super Bantamweight title.
| 2020-03-22 | Win | (Japan) Akihiro Kaneko | K-1: K’Festa 3 | Saitama, Japan | Decision (Majority) | 3 | 3:00 |
| 2019-11-16 | Win | (Japan) Yuta Hayashi | Krush 108 | Osaka, Japan | Decision (Majority) | 3 | 3:00 |
Defends the Krush Super Bantamweight title.
| 2019-06-30 | Loss | (Japan) Yoshiki Takei | K-1 World GP 2019: Super Bantamweight World Tournament, Final | Saitama, Japan | KO (Punch and Kick) | 2 | 0:38 |
For the 2019 K-1 Super Bantamweight World Tournament title.
| 2019-06-30 | Win | (Armenia) Samvel Babayan | K-1 World GP 2019: Super Bantamweight World Tournament, Semi Finals | Saitama, Japan | Decision (Unanimous) | 3 | 3:00 |
| 2019-06-30 | Win | (Thailand) Phetpangan Mor.Ratanabandit | K-1 World GP 2019: Super Bantamweight World Tournament, Quarter Finals | Saitama, Japan | TKO (2 knockdowns/Punches) | 1 | 2:28 |
| 2019-02-16 | Win | (Japan) Taito Gunji | Krush.98, Tournament Final | Tokyo, Japan | Decision (Unanimous) | 3 | 3:00 |
Wins the vacant Krush Super Bantamweight title.
| 2018-12-16 | Win | (United States) Victor Saravia | Krush.96, Tournament Semifinal | Tokyo, Japan | Ext.R Decision (Unanimous) | 4 | 3:00 |
| 2018-10-28 | Win | (Japan) Shota Oiwa | Krush.94, Tournament Quarterfinal | Tokyo, Japan | KO (Left hook) | 1 | 1:35 |
| 2018-06-30 | Win | (Japan) Yusho Kanemoto | Krush.89 | Tokyo, Japan | Decision (Unanimous) | 3 | 3:00 |
| 2018-03-10 | Win | (Japan) Tatsuya Tsubakihara | Krush.86 | Tokyo, Japan | Decision (Unanimous) | 3 | 3:00 |
| 2018-01-27 | Win | (Japan) Kazuki Okawa | Krush.84 | Tokyo, Japan | TKO (3 Knockdowns) | 1 | 2:11 |
| 2017-04-09 | Loss | (Japan) Koudai | DEEP☆KICK 32 | Osaka, Japan | KO (Left high kick) | 2 | 2:26 |
| 2016-11-03 | Loss | (Japan) Yoshiho Tane | DEEP☆KICK 31 | Osaka, Japan | Decision (Split) | 3 | 3:00 |
| 2016-07-17 | Win | (Japan) Yuto Kuroda | DEEP☆KICK 30 | Osaka, Japan | TKO | 1 | 2:52 |
| 2015-11-01 | Win | (Japan) Teishi | NJKF 2015 8th | Osaka, Japan | KO | 1 | 2:41 |
| 2015-07-26 | Win | (Japan) Masato Ooba | DEEP☆KICK 26 | Osaka, Japan | KO (Left body kick) | 1 | 3:00 |
| 2014-11-02 | Win | (Japan) Yamashita Spankey Hiroshi | NJKF 2014 7th | Osaka, Japan | KO (Right hook) | 2 | 2:15 |
| 2014-10-12 | Win | (Japan) Kyosuke Nishida | NJKF IGOSSO REBORN 2014 | Nankoku, Kōchi, Japan | Decision (Unanimous) | 3 | 3:00 |
Legend: Win Loss Draw/No contest Notes

Amateur Kickboxing Record
| Date | Result | Opponent | Event | Location | Method | Round | Time |
|---|---|---|---|---|---|---|---|
| 2013-09-22 | Draw | (Japan) Yoshiho Tane | DEEP☆KICK 17 ～ | Osaka, Japan | Decision | 3 | 3:00 |
For the TOP RUN -45kg title.
| 2013-09-01 | Win | (Japan) Ryo Mandokoro | NEXT LEVEL Kansai 9, Final | Osaka, Japan | Decision (Majority) | 2 | 2:00 |
| 2013-09-01 | Win | (Japan) Ryunosuke Sato | NEXT LEVEL Kansai 9, Semi Final | Osaka, Japan | Decision (Unanimous) | 2 | 2:00 |
Legend: Win Loss Draw/No contest Notes

== See also ==
- List of male kickboxers
- List of Krush champions
