= Tenshin Nasukawa vs. Takeru =

Kickboxing match in Tokyo, Japan

THE MATCH 2022
- Date: June 19, 2022
- Venue: Tokyo Dome, Bunkyo-ku, Tokyo, Japan

Tale of the tape
Boxer	Takeru Segawa	Tenshin Nasukawa
Nickname	Natural Born Crusher	Prodigy
Hometown	Yonago, Tottori Prefecture	Matsudo, Chiba Prefecture
Pre-fight record	40–2 (24KO)	43–0 (30KO)
Age	30	23
Height	168 cm (5 ft 6 in)	165 cm (5 ft 5 in)
Weight	58.0 kg (128 lb)	57.95 kg (128 lb)
Style	Orthodox	Southpaw
Recognition	K-1 WORLD GP Super Featherweight Champion, K-1 WORLD GP 3rd Class Conqueror, Krush Featherweight Champion	RISE World Featherweight Champion / ISKA Oriental Rule World Bantamweight Champion / ISKA Freestyle Rule World Featherweight Champion

Result
- Nasukawa wins via unanimous decision

Tenshin Nasukawa vs. Takeru (also known as The Match 2022) was a professional kickboxing event held at The Tokyo Dome on June 19, 2022. Rizin Fighting Federation CEO Nobuyuki Sakakibara was a general producer, and has stated that this would be a neutral event regardless of the organization.

The main card featured fighters from K-1, RISE, and other kickboxing promotions. The main event was a cross-promotional bout between Tenshin Nasukawa, representing RISE, and Takeru, representing K-1.

== Background ==
Nasukawa has been calling out Three-division K-1 champion Takeru Segawa since June 8, 2015. But due to contractual obligations, both fighters were not able to meet in the ring.

On August 5, 2015, Takeru told the media that he was interested in fighting Nasukawa if K-1 can organize it. K-1 Japan group producer, Mitsuru Miyata, demanded that Nasukawa sign an exclusive contract with K-1 to be able to make the fight happen. Nasukawa's trainer and RISE president, Takashi Ito, told combat sports magazine Fight & Life, that he will agree to let Nasukawa fight in a K-1 event but he's not willing to give up Nasukawa to an exclusive contract with K-1.

In 2015, K-1 officially made a partnership with the new MMA promotion, Rizin Fighting Federation. Rizin president, Nobuyuki Sakakibara, announced that Rizin is willing to make partnerships with every fighting organization so RISE began to work with Rizin as well. This deal made it more possible for a Nasukawa–Segawa matchup.

November 8, 2015, Nasukawa had a knockout victory over French Muay Thai fighter Mike Alamos. After the match in the ring, Nasukawa announced that he wanted to fight in Rizin.

On November 21, 2015, Takeru made his first defense of his K-1 55 kg world title against Charles Bongiovanni, he won the fight by TKO. After the match, during the in-ring interview, Takeru announced his desire to fight in Rizin, 2 weeks after Nasukawa announced the same. When Takeru returned backstage, Nasukawa approached him and demanded the fight. During the press conference, Takeru mentioned that he did not recognize Nasukawa and could not understand what he was saying due to the crowd noise and thought he was just a fan. Takeru confirmed that he is willing to accept the fight if offered. After this event, Nasukawa tweeted that Takeru agreed to fight him on New Year's Eve.

On December 8, 2015, Rizin announced a fight between Takeru and Chinese fighter, Yang Ming, for their New Year's Eve event. At the press conference, Rizin president, Sakakibara, acknowledged requests to make a Nasukawa vs. Takeru fight, however, he said there wasn't enough time to promote the fight and promised to try to make it happen in 2016.

In 2016, Nasukawa signed with Rizin to fight on a December event. However, K-1 suddenly ended their partnership with Rizin.

On June 18, 2017, after Takeru knocked out Buvaisar Paskhaev, K-1 commentator, Masato, expressed his desire to see Takeru fight Nasukawa. 2 days later, K-1's official YouTube channel uploaded the full fight video of Takeru and Paskhaev but a few hours later it was deleted and re-uploaded without Masato's comments.

On August 29, 2017, Rizin executive Nobuhiko Takada said on Twitter, "Two of the biggest superstars of kickboxing, Takeru vs Tenshin Nasukawa should be made right now! If this super-fight will not happen due to the (sic) cold war, it is heinous crime! Let's make this! Make miracle!" A few hours later a K-1 broadcaster trolled Takada on Twitter. A few days later, Takada apologized and promised to never talk about a fighter from another organization and deleted every tweet about Nasukawa vs Takeru.

On December 31, 2017, Nasukawa won Rizin's Kickboxing 57 kg tournament. In an attempt to influence K-1 and Rise to make the Takeru fight, Nasukawa made sure the show was being broadcast live so Rizin would not be able to cut any of his comments. Post-fight, in the ring, Nasukawa engaged the crowd by asking who they want him to fight next and the crowd screamed Takeru's name.

In February 2018, M-1 Sports Media, which operates K-1, filed a lawsuit against Tenshin, his father Hiroyuki, Rise president Takashi Ito and Rizin president Sakakibara. According to the lawsuit, it all started three years ago when Nasukawa called out Takeru to fight. More recently during Rizin's New Year's Eve event when Nasukawa asked the audience who they want him to fight next. They claim that it's an unfair business practice to involve another fighter's name from a different organization. And, they claim that many people has negative image about Takeru run away from Nasukawa, and they lost 6 sponsors. And, they file a damage suit 137,000,000 yen. But, 1 of 6 sponsors told Japanese weekly magazine Shukan Shincho "Our contract of K-1, we distribute Bento 3 times only. We can't understand why K-1 demands too expensive money".

On March 16, 2018, Rise president Takashi Ito, former K-1 fighter Hiroya and his lawyer, accused K-1 Japan Group's exclusive contract, illegal based on the competition law. Hiroya's lawyer told the media, that the way K-1's contract work makes you not fight for a year for your contract to expire. Every fight you make with the organization, extends your contract for another year from your last fight and the only way to get out of the contract is not get paid for a year. Hiroya cites this as the reason why Segawa could not fight Nasukawa as he knows Segawa as a friend and will not back down to a fight.

=== Overview of Bout ===
A press conference was held in Tokyo on December 24, 2021, and it was announced that the two would play against each other in June 2022. The weight is 58 kg contracted the day before, and there is also a weighing on the day, and the recovery limit is up to 4 kg. One Catch One Attack Ali's kickboxing rules and criteria have been clarified, and it has been announced that the rules will be detailed in the future. He also wanted to announce "event titles, host organizations, distribution and broadcasting stations, and other ticket inquiries around the beginning of the year". Sakakibara said, "Tenshin was scheduled to retire from kickboxing in April, so postponing kickboxing due to Takeru will be a negative for Tenshin's boxing career, and boxing officials are also welcome. It would be a nuisance, but we were able to realize it with the understanding of everyone involved. " In addition, Takeru hoped that "there is no need for judgment or draw, so there is no limit to the extension", but Sakakibara said, "I was Kazushi Sakuraba vs Royce Gracie in the PRIDE era. "I've been fighting for 90 minutes in an unlimited round for 15 minutes. When I say unlimited rounds, working as a judge's mental is afraid of winning or losing, so there is no end to draws, draws, draws. I'm in a position to organize this, considering the problem of the scale with the broadcasting station, the terrestrial broadcasting station, the distribution station, etc. I would like to do it. Among them, I would like to find a place like how to settle with a mast. Therefore, I can understand Takeru's thoughts. I'll do my best to come up with an answer that it's not an unlimited round to settle completely. I'm going to coordinate this with everyone involved, "he said, although he was negative about the unlimited rounds, he agreed without a draw.

On December 31, 2021, an exhibition match with Takanori Gomi, the last RIZIN match of Nasukawa, was held at RIZIN.33, and Takeru entered the ring after the match. When Takeru called, "Let's have the best result in June," Nasukawa also enthusiastically said, "It's a story that I started, so I'll finish it well."

On February 27, 2022, Takeru will play an exhibition match with Taito Gunji, the K-1 WORLD GP featherweight champion, at the K-1 WORLD GP 2022 JAPAN held at the Tokyo Metropolitan Gymnasium. At a press conference after the match, Takeru told Nasukawa, who is about to play in April, "Don't just get injured. I want to be in perfect condition in June. I'll be waiting at Tokyo Dome." I sent an ale

On April 1, 2022, Dream Factory Worldwide, K-1, and RISE announced that the Nasukawa VS Takeru match will be held at Tokyo Dome on June 19, 2022.

On April 7, 2022, a press conference was held in Tokyo regarding the card. In addition to both players, RIZIN CEO Nobuyuki Sakakibara, K-1 producer Takumi Nakamura, and RISE representative Takashi Ito attended. It was announced that the show's name was "THE MATCH 2022" and the number of rounds was decided to be 3 minutes 3 rounds plus 1 extra round

On April 25, 2022, in the June issue of GOETHE Goethe magazine (Gentosha), K-1 had never been interviewed by the media and made a leap as a fixer, and once filed a lawsuit against the Nasugawa camp. Mitsuru Yabuk, the executive committee chairman of the executive committee, talked with Susumu Fujita, the president of CyberAgent and the president of ABEMA. I think it's okay to have it. Here, we will spread a new perspective on TV. From that point of view, this time, as the K-1 side, we gave GO to Taketaka's game. It is an exception.

On June 9, 2022, a pre-special program for "THE MATCH 2022" was aired on ABEMA, and it was announced that the gloves used in the match would be 6 ounces made by Winning.

On June 15, 2022, the special rules for Nasukawa VS Takeru were announced, and a three-knockdown system (TKO if there are three downs in 1R) and an open scoring system that discloses all round points. It was announced that the judges would be a five-judgment system with "five" judges, and the player who was judged to be superior by three or more players would be the winner.。

On June 18, 2022, a weighing and press conference was held the day before, with Nasukawa passing 57.95 kg under 50 grams and Takeru passing at the limit of just 58.0 kg.。

== Broadcast / Distribution ==
Initially, Fuji Television planned to broadcast live for two hours, but later announced on May 31, 2022 that it would not broadcast the tournament on its website.。In response to this, Nasukawa said, "It's not for money. I'm doing it for the future. What about the children?" Takeru said, "I want you to understand the meaning of this game. I haven't given up yet. ", Each made an indignant comment on their own SNS. In addition, during the relevant time zone, "Super Class! The World's Impossible Strongest Video 2022" will be broadcast

After that, it was announced on June 18, 2022 that it would be recorded and broadcast on Tokyo MX on July 24, 2022.

In addition, Abema is also scheduled to deliver live in PPV format。

== Fight Card ==
The Match 2022
Weight Class				Method	Round	T.Time
Catchweight 58 kg	Tenshin Nasukawa	def.	Takeru Segawa	Decision (Unanimous)	3	3:00
Catchweight 68.5 kg	Kaito Ono	def.	Masaaki Noiri	Ext R. Decision (Unanimous)	4	3:00
Super lightweight 65 kg	Kento Haraguchi	def.	Hideaki Yamazaki	TKO (Ref Stoppage)	2	0:33
Catchweight 67 kg	Rukiya Anpo	def.	Kosei Yamada	Decision (Unanimous)	3	3:00
Lightweight 63 kg	Kongnapa Weerasakreck	def.	Taiju Shiratori	TKO (Punch)	1	2:47
Catchweight 62 kg	Kan Nakamura	def.	Leona Pettas	Decision (Majority)	3	3:00
Catchweight 62 kg	YA-MAN	def.	Ryusei Ashizawa	KO (punch)	1	1:49
Catchweight 71 kg	Hiromi Wajima	def.	BeyNoah	Decision (Unanimous)	3	3:00
Catchweight 100 kg	Sina Karimian	def.	Rikiya Yamashita	Decision (Unanimous)	3	3:00
Catchweight 100 kg	Mahmoud Sattari	def.	Yuta Uchida	KO (punch)	1	1:18
Super featherweight 60 kg	Yuki Kasahara	def.	Chihiro Nakajima	Decision (Unanimous)	3	3:00
Bantamweight 53 kg	Kazane Nagai	def.	Toma Kuroda	Ext R. Decision (Unanimous)	4	3:00
Super bantamweight 55 kg	Mutsuki Ebata	def.	Riamu	Ext R. Decision (Split)	4	3:00
Super bantamweight 55 kg	Masashi Kumura	def.	Shiro	Decision (Unanimous) (30-28, 30-29, 30-29)	3	3:00
Super bantamweight 55 kg	Masahiko Suzuki	def.	Akihiro Kaneko	Decision (Majority) (30-29, 29-29, 30-29)	3	3:00
Bantamweight 53 kg	Rui Okubo	def.	Ryujin Nasukawa	Decision (Unanimous) (30-28, 30-29, 30-29)	3	3:00

== Match details ==
=== Contract weight ===
58 kg contract for weighing the day before, weighing up to 4 kg on the day (3 hours before the match)

=== Rules ===
- Kickboxing rule with one catch and one attack (grabbing is valid only for momentary ones accompanied by an attack, and when the opponent's kick foot is grabbed, only one of kick, knee, and punch is valid momentarily. When you grab the opponent's head, you can instantly hit with your knees only once.)
- Three knockdown system (TKO if there are 3 downs in 1R)
- Open scoring method that publishes all round scores

=== Judging ===
- Judges are a 5-judgment system with "5" judges, and the player who is judged to be superior by 3 or more judges wins the decision
- Scored by the 10-point method for each round based on the judgment criteria. The scoring of the extension R is based on the content of the match only for the extension R, and each judge always decides the superiority or inferiority by the mast evaluation with either player as the winner.
- Judgment criteria are 1. number of downs, 2. damage done to opponent, 3. number of clean hits, 4. aggressiveness

=== Number of Rounds ===
3 minutes 3R + extension 1R (only extension is completely settled by mast judgment)

=== Gloves ===
Winning 6 oz

=== Ring Size ===
6.5 meters square

== Viewership ==
After the event, K-1 president Kazuyoshi Ishii revealed that over 500,000 PPV were sold alongside the 56,399 people in attendance.
