= Junki Sasaki =

Japanese male kickboxer

- Born: 佐々木 洵樹; 14 June 1991 (age 35); Asahikawa, Japan
- Other names: ササキ ジュンキ
- Nationality: Japanese
- Height: 1.70 m (5 ft 7 in)
- Weight: 55 kg (121 lb; 8 st 9 lb)
- Style: Kickboxing
- Fighting out of: Tokyo, Japan
- Team: POWER OF DREAM
- Years active: 2009 - 2022

Professional boxing record
- Total: 23
- Wins: 19
- By knockout: 7
- Losses: 4
- By knockout: 0

Kickboxing record
- Total: 8
- Wins: 7
- By knockout: 1
- Losses: 1
- By knockout: 1

Other information
- Boxing record from BoxRec

Junki Sasaki (born 14 June 1991) is a retired Japanese kickboxer and boxer. As a professional kickboxer, he held the Krush Bantamweight title between 2019 and 2020.

Sasaki was ranked as a top ten flyweight (-56 kg) kickboxer by Combat Press from April 2021 until December 2022, and as a top ten super flyweight (-55 kg) kickboxer by Beyond Kick from October to December 2022.

== Kickboxing career ==
=== Bantamweight career ===
Sasaki was scheduled to make his kickboxing against Yuta Hayashi at Krush 98. He won the fight by unanimous decision.

After a first-round TKO of Shuto Hagiwara at Krush 103, Sasaki was scheduled to fight Koki Tomimura for the Krush Bantamweight title at Krush 107. Sasaki beat Tomimura by unanimous decision.

Sasaki was scheduled to make his first title defense against Samvel Babayan at Krush 112. The fight was later cancelled, as Babayan was unable to fly to Japan due to restrictions imposed to combat the COVID-19 pandemic.

=== Super Bantamweight career ===
For his next fight, Sasaki moved up in weight to super bantamweight, and was scheduled to fight Ryuto at Krush 116. He won the fight by majority decision.

Sasaki was scheduled to make his K-1 debut against another undefeated kickboxer in Riamu at K-1 World GP 2020 Winter's Crucial Bout. He won the fight by unanimous decision.

Sasaki was scheduled to fight Rat EiwaSportsGym at a 56 kg catchweight bout. Sasaki won the fight by majority decision. During the post-fight conference, Sasaki stated he was considering retirement. K-1 later changed the majority decision win to a unanimous decision win for Sasaki.

Sasaki was scheduled to take part in the 2022 K-1 Super Bantamweight World Grand Prix, which was held at K-1 World GP 2022 Japan on February 27, 2022. He faced Sho Uchida in the tournament quarterfinals. The fight was ruled a majority decision draw after the first three rounds, with one judge scoring the fight 30–29 for Uchida, while the remaining two judges scored it an even 30–30 draw. Sasaki was awarded the unanimous decision after an extension round was fought. He announced his retirement from professional competition on December 20, 2022.

== Championships and accomplishments ==
- 2019 Krush Bantamweight (53 kg) Champion

== Kickboxing record ==
Professional Kickboxing Record
7 Wins (1 (T)KO's), 1 Loss, 0 Draw, 0 No Contest
| Date | Result | Opponent | Event | Location | Method | Round | Time |
| 2022-02-27 | Loss | (Japan) Masashi Kumura | K-1 World GP 2022 Japan, Super Bantamweight World GP Semi Finals | Tokyo, Japan | TKO (2 Knockdowns/Punches) | 1 | 1:37 |
| 2022-02-27 | Win | (Japan) Sho Uchida | K-1 World GP 2022 Japan, Super Bantamweight World GP Quarter Finals | Tokyo, Japan | Ext.R Decision (Unanimous) | 4 | 3:00 |
| 2021-05-23 | Win | (Thailand) Rat EiwaSportsGym | K-1 World GP 2021: Japan Bantamweight Tournament | Tokyo, Japan | Decision (Unanimous) | 3 | 3:00 |
| 2020-12-12 | Win | (Japan) Riamu | K-1 World GP 2020 Winter's Crucial Bout | Tokyo, Japan | Decision (Unanimous) | 3 | 3:00 |
| 2020-08-29 | Win | (Japan) Ryuto | Krush 116 | Tokyo, Japan | Decision (Majority) | 3 | 3:00 |
| 2019-11-08 | Win | (Japan) Koki | Krush 107 | Tokyo, Japan | Decision (Unanimous) | 3 | 3:00 |
Wins the Krush Bantamweight -53 kg title.
| 2019-07-21 | Win | (Japan) Shuto Hagiwara | Krush 103 | Tokyo, Japan | TKO (Three knockdowns) | 1 | 2:51 |
| 2019-02-16 | Win | (Japan) Yuta Hayashi | Krush 98 | Tokyo, Japan | Decision (Unanimous) | 3 | 3:00 |
Legend: Win Loss Draw/No contest Notes

== Boxing record ==
| 23 fights | 19 wins | 4 losses |
|---|---|---|
| By knockout | 7 | 0 |
| By decision | 12 | 4 |

| No. | Result | Record | Opponent | Type | Round, time | Date | Location | Notes |
|---|---|---|---|---|---|---|---|---|
| 23 | Loss | 19–4 | (Japan) Ryo Sagawa | SD | 8 | 2 June 2018 | Korakuen Hall, Tokyo, Japan | |
| 22 | Win | 19–3 | (Philippines) Ronnie Campos | UD | 8 | 2 December 2017 | Korakuen Hall, Tokyo, Japan | |
| 21 | Win | 18–3 | (South Korea) Sang Hoo Gil | TKO | 5 (8) | 25 June 2017 | Susukino Mars, Sapporo, Hokkaido, Japan | |
| 20 | Win | 17–3 | (Japan) Yudai Tamagawa | UD | 8 | 12 December 2016 | Korakuen Hall, Tokyo, Japan | |
| 19 | Win | 16–3 | (Japan) Reiko Sugiyama | UD | 8 | 2 July 2016 | Korakuen Hall, Tokyo, Japan | |
| 18 | Win | 15–3 | (Thailand) Panupong Anowan | KO | 2 (8) | 2 July 2016 | Korakuen Hall, Tokyo, Japan | |
| 17 | Win | 14–3 | (Japan) Yuki Kumazoe | UD | 8 | 3 October 2015 | Korakuen Hall, Tokyo, Japan | |
| 16 | Loss | 13–3 | (Japan) Ryo Takenaka | UD | 8 | 13 April 2015 | Korakuen Hall, Tokyo, Japan | |
| 15 | Win | 13–2 | (Japan) Shingo Kusano | UD | 8 | 14 October 2014 | Korakuen Hall, Tokyo, Japan | |
| 14 | Win | 12–2 | (Japan) Kohei Maruoka | UD | 8 | 7 June 2014 | Korakuen Hall, Tokyo, Japan | |
| 13 | Loss | 11–2 | (Japan) Ryosei Arai | UD | 8 | 1 June 2013 | Korakuen Hall, Tokyo, Japan | |
| 12 | Win | 11–1 | (Japan) Shingo Nagahama | TKO | 6 (8) | 2 February 2013 | Korakuen Hall, Tokyo, Japan | |
| 11 | Win | 10–1 | (Japan) Yoshinori Koto | TKO | 8 (8) | 4 August 2012 | Korakuen Hall, Tokyo, Japan | |
| 10 | Win | 9–1 | (Japan) Shinya Takahashi | UD | 8 | 4 February 2012 | Korakuen Hall, Tokyo, Japan | |
| 9 | Win | 8–1 | (Japan) Ryoji Okahata | MD | 6 | 6 November 2011 | Yoyogi #2 Gymnasium, Yoyogi, Japan | |
| 8 | Win | 7–1 | (Japan) Atsuro Ito | TKO | 2 (6) | 4 June 2011 | Korakuen Hall, Tokyo, Japan | |
| 7 | Win | 6–1 | (Japan) Isao Sasaki | TKO | 2 (6) | 5 March 2011 | Korakuen Hall, Tokyo, Japan | |
| 6 | Win | 5–1 | (Japan) Yusuke Sekido | UD | 4 | 6 November 2010 | Korakuen Hall, Tokyo, Japan | |
| 5 | Loss | 4–1 | (Japan) Yuki Iwasaki | SD | 4 | 21 May 2010 | Korakuen Hall, Tokyo, Japan | |
| 4 | Win | 4–0 | (Japan) Muneaki Hasumi | UD | 4 | 31 March 2010 | Korakuen Hall, Tokyo, Japan | |
| 3 | Win | 3–0 | (Japan) Hiroyuki Sagehashi | UD | 4 | 5 December 2009 | Korakuen Hall, Tokyo, Japan | |
| 2 | Win | 2–0 | (Japan) Naoto Kawashita | UD | 4 | 14 July 2009 | Korakuen Hall, Tokyo, Japan | |
| 1 | Win | 1–0 | (Japan) Hideshi Natsui | TKO | 4 (4) | 21 February 2009 | Korakuen Hall, Tokyo, Japan | |

== See also ==
- List of male kickboxers
