= 2020 in K-1 =

Mixed martial arts events

Information
- First date: March 22, 2020
- Last date: December 13, 2020

Events
- Total events: 4

Fights
- Total fights: 67
- Title fights: 6

The year 2020 is the 27th year in the history of the K-1, a Japanese kickboxing promotion. The year started with K-1: K’Festa 3.

== List of events ==
#	Event Title	Date	Arena	Location
1	K-1: K’Festa 3	March 22, 2020	Saitama Super Arena	Saitama, Japan
2	K-1 World GP 2020 in Osaka	September 22, 2020	EDION Arena	Osaka, Japan
3	K-1 World GP 2020 in Fukuoka	November 2, 2020	Fukuoka International Center	Fukuoka, Japan
4	K-1 World GP 2020 in Tokyo	December 13, 2020	Ryōgoku Kokugikan	Tokyo, Japan

== K-1: K’Festa 3 ==
K-1: K’Festa 3
- Promotion: K-1
- Date: March 22, 2020
- Venue: Saitama Super Arena
- City: Saitama, Japan

K-1: K’Festa 3 was a kickboxing event held by K-1 on March 22, 2020 at the Saitama Super Arena in Saitama, Japan.

=== Background ===
The K’Festa 3 event took place on March 22, 2020 in the Saitama Super Arena. The card was scheduled to have an eight man Super Welterweight tournament, featuring: Hiromi Wajima, Avatar Tor Morsi, Yasuhiro Kido, Minoru Kimura, Kaito, Eder Lopes, Katsuya Jinbo and Milan Pales.

Three title defense took place: Yuta Kubo defended the Welterweight title against Jordann Pikeur, Rukiya Anpo defended the Super Lightweight title against Fukashi, and Sina Karimian defended the Cruiserweight title against Ryo Aitaka.

==== K-1 World GP 2020 -70kg Japan Tournament bracket ====
Quarter-Finals
(Brazil) Minoru Kimura	KO
(Japan) Kaito	1r.
(Portugal) Eder Lopes	KO
(Japan) Katsuya Jinbo	2r.
(Slovakia) Milan Pales	2r.
(Japan) Yasuhiro Kido	KO
(Thailand) Avatar Tor Morsi	3r.
(Japan) Hiromi Wajima	KO

Semi-Finals
(Brazil) Minoru Kimura	KO
(Portugal) Eder Lopes	1r.
(Japan) Yasuhiro Kido	3r.
(Japan) Hiromi Wajima	UD

Final
(Brazil) Minoru Kimura	TKO
(Japan) Hiromi Wajima	1r.

=== Results ===
K’Festa 3
Weight Class				Method	Round	Time	Notes
Super Welterweight 70 kg	(Brazil) Minoru Kimura	def.	(Japan) Hiromi Wajima	TKO (Corner Stoppage)	1	1:10	Super Welterweight GP Final
Super Featherweight 60 kg	(Japan) Takeru	def.	(Thailand) Petchdam Petchkiatpetch	KO (Punches)	2	0:49	
Cruiserweight 90 kg	(Iran) Sina Karimian (c)	def.	(Japan) Ryo Aitaka	Decision (Unanimous)	3	3:00	For the K-1 Cruiserweight Championship
Super Bantamweight 55 kg	(Japan) Yoshiki Takei	def.	(Thailand) Dansiam Ayothayafightgym	Decision (Unanimous)	3	3:00	
W.Flyweight 50 kg	(Japan) Kana Morimoto	def.	(Italy) Gloria Peritore	KO (Punch)	1	2:42	
Lightweight 62.5 kg	(Japan) Taio Asahisa	def.	(Japan) Kenta Hayashi	Decision (Unanimous)	3	3:00	
Super Lightweight 65 kg	(Japan) Rukiya Anpo (c)	def.	(Japan) Fukashi	Decision (Unanimous)	3	3:00	For the K-1 Super Lightweight Championship
Super Welterweight 70 kg	(Japan) Hiromi Wajima	def.	(Japan) Yasuhiro Kido	Decision (Unanimous)	3	3:00	Super Welterweight GP Semi-Finals
Super Welterweight 70 kg	(Brazil) Minoru Kimura	def.	(Portugal) Eder Lopes	KO (Punch)	1	1:02	Super Welterweight GP Semi-Finals
Welterweight 67.5 kg	(Japan) Masaaki Noiri	def.	(Spain) David Mejia	Decision (Unanimous)	3	3:00	
Super Featherweight 60 kg	(Japan) Leona Pettas	def.	(Japan) Yuta Murakoshi	TKO (Punches)	3	2:33	
Super Bantamweight 55 kg	(Japan) Masashi Kumura	def.	(Japan) Akihiro Kaneko	Decision (Majority)	3	3:00	
Featherweight 57.5 kg	(Thailand) Jawsuayai Sor.Dechaphan	def.	(Japan) Kaito Ozawa	TKO (Cut)	2	3:00	
Welterweight 67.5 kg	(Japan) Yuta Kubo (c)	def.	(Netherlands) Jordann Pikeur	Decision (Unanimous)	3	3:00	For the K-1 Welterweight Championship
Lightweight 62.5 kg	(Japan) Hideaki Yamazaki	def.	(Japan) Hikaru Terashima	KO (Punches)	2	2:59	
Catchweight 61 kg	(Japan) Yutaka	def.	(Japan) Satoru Nariai	Decision (Unanimous)	3	3:00	
Super Welterweight 70 kg	(Japan) Hiromi Wajima	def.	(Thailand) Avatar Tor Morsi	KO (Leg Kick)	3	0:40	Super Welterweight GP Quarter-Finals
Super Welterweight 70 kg	(Japan) Yasuhiro Kido	def.	(Slovakia) Milan Pales	KO (Head Kick)	2	1:54	Super Welterweight GP Quarter-Finals
Super Welterweight 70 kg	(Portugal) Eder Lopes	def.	(Japan) Katsuya Jinbo	KO (Punches)	2	0:49	Super Welterweight GP Quarter-Finals
Super Welterweight 70 kg	(Brazil) Minoru Kimura	def.	(Japan) Kaito	KO (Punches)	1	2:10	Super Welterweight GP Quarter-Finals
Super Welterweight 70 kg	(Japan) Daisuke Fujimura	def.	(Japan) Kotetsu	Decision (Unanimous)	3	3:00	Super Welterweight GP Reserve Fight
Cruiserweight 90 kg	(Japan) Shinya Uemura	-	(Japan) Seiya Tanigawa	Draw (Majority)	3	3:00	
Lightweight 62.5 kg	(Japan) Riamu	def.	(Japan) Ryuto	Decision (Unanimous)	3	3:00	
Lightweight 62.5 kg	(Japan) Hikaru Hasumi	def.	(Japan) Hisaki Higashimoto	KO (Punches)	3	2:53	
Super Bantamweight 55 kg	(Japan) Rira	def.	(Japan) Jin	KO (Head kick)	1	1:57	

== K-1 World GP 2020 in Osaka ==
K-1 World GP 2020 in Osaka
- Promotion: K-1
- Date: September 22, 2020
- Venue: Edion Arena
- City: Osaka, Japan

K-1 World GP 2020 in Osaka will be a kickboxing event held by K-1 on September 22, 2020 at the Edion Arena in Osaka, Japan.

=== Background ===
The card featured one title defense, as Rukiya Anpo defended the Super Lightweight title against Hideaki Yamazaki.

=== Fight Card ===
K-1 World GP 2020 in Osaka
Weight Class				Method	Round	Time	Notes
Super Lightweight 65 kg	(Japan) Hideaki Yamazaki	def.	(Japan) Rukiya Anpo (c)	KO (Left Hook)	1	1:18	For the K-1 Super Lightweight Championship
	(Japan) Takeru	vs.	(Japan) Kizaemon Saiga				Exhibition
Catchweight 58 kg	(Japan) Tatsuya Tsubakihara	def.	(Japan) Yuki Egawa	Decision (Majority)	3	3:00	
Catchweight 63.5 kg	(Japan) Koya Urabe	def.	(Japan) Yuto Shinohara	Ext.R Decision (Unanimous)	4	3:00	
W.Minimumweight 48 kg	(Japan) Miho Takanashi	def.	(Japan) Mio Tsumura	Decision (Unanimous)	3	3:00	
Super Welterweight 70 kg	(Japan) Hiromi Wajima	def.	(Thailand) Raseasing Weerasakreck	KO	2	0:59	
Super Lightweight 65 kg	(Japan) Jin Hirayama	def.	(Japan) Fukashi Mizutani	Decision (Unanimous)	3	3:00	
Cruiserweight 90 kg	(Japan) Hitoshi Sugimoto	def.	(Japan) Hisaki Kato	Decision (Extra round)	4	3:00	
Lightweight 62.5 kg	(Japan) Taio Asahisa	def.	(Japan) Hiroki	KO	2	0:56	
Lightweight 62.5 kg	(Japan) Shuji Kawarada	def.	(Japan) Seiya Ueda	Decision (Unanimous)	3	3:00	
Super Featherweight 60 kg	(Japan) Tetsu	def.	(Japan) Narufumi Nishimoto	Decision (Unanimous)	3	3:00	
Super Lightweight 65 kg	(Japan) Kensei Kondo	def.	(Japan) Taito	TKO	3	0:01	
Preliminary Card
Super Bantamweight 55 kg	(Japan) Yuto Kuroda	def.	(Japan) Hiroki Mitsui	Decision (Unanimous)	3	3:00	
Featherweight 57.5 kg	(Japan) Naoki Takahashi	def.	(Japan) Ryota Ishida	Decision (Unanimous)	3	3:00	
Featherweight 57.5 kg	(Japan) Riki	def.	(Japan) Kaito Yamawaki	Decision (Unanimous)	3	3:00	
Lightweight 63 kg	(Japan) Takumi Nagai	def.	(Japan) Rioya	KO	3	1:33	
Bantamweight 53 kg	(Japan) Yuki Toyoda	def.	(Japan) Tsubasa Yamawaki	Decision (Unanimous)	3	3:00	

== K-1 World GP 2020 in Fukuoka ==
K-1: K-1 World GP 2020 in Fukuoka
- Promotion: K-1
- Date: November 3, 2020
- Venue: Fukuoka International Center
- City: Fukuoka, Japan

K-1 World GP 2020 in Fukuoka was a kickboxing event held by K-1 on November 3, 2020 at the Fukuoka International Center in Fukuoka, Japan.

=== Background ===
The event had a limited audience, with prices for seats moving from 100,000円 (~$948) to 10,000円 (~$95). It was supposed to feature a title defense, as Leona Pettas should have challenged Takeru Segawa for his Super Featherweight title but Takeru suffered an injury to his left hand.

=== Fight Card ===
K-1 World GP 2020 in Fukuoka
Weight Class				Method	Round	Time	Notes
Cruiserweight 90 kg	(Japan) K-Jee	def.	(Iran) Sina Karimian (c)	TKO (Corner Stoppage)	1	1:54	For the K-1 Cruiserweight title.
W. Flyweight 52 kg	(Japan) Kotomi	def.	(Japan) Kana Morimoto	Decision (Unanimous)	3	3:00	
Welterweight 67.5 kg	(Japan) Masaaki Noiri	def.	(Brazil) Vitor Tofanelli	Decision (Unanimous)	3	3:00	
Super Featherweight 60 kg	(Japan) Hirotaka Asahisa	def.	(Japan) Tatsuya Oiwa	Decision (Unanimous)	3	3:00	
Cruiserweight 90 kg	(Japan) Animal Koji	def.	(Japan) RUI	TKO (Three Knockdowns)	2	2:53	
Super Featherweight 60 kg	(Japan) SATORU Nariai	def.	(Japan) Masahiro Yamamoto	Decision (Unanimous)	3	3:00	
W. Atomweight 48 kg	(Japan) Mako Yamada	def.	(Japan) Yu	Decision (Unanimous)	3	3:00	
Lightweight 62.5kg	(Japan) Hiroshi Mizumachi	def.	(Japan) Tatsuki	Decision (Extra round)	4	3:00	
Super Welterweight 70 kg	(Japan) Kotetsu	def.	(Japan) Kenta	KO (Right Hook)	3	0:56	
Super Bantamweight 55 kg	(Japan) Kazuki Miburo	def.	(Japan) Koki	Decision (Split)	3	3:00	
Preliminary Card
Super Bantamweight 55 kg	(Japan) Aoi Noda	def.	(Japan) Shion	Decision (Unanimous)	3	3:00	
Catchweight 59 kg	(Japan) Takumi Terada	def.	(Japan) Hirotaka Sadamatsu	KO (Right Straight)	1	2:06	
Super Featherweight 60 kg	(Japan) Yuji	def.	(Japan) Motoki	Decision (Unanimous)	3	3:00	
Catchweight 53 kg	(Japan) Kazuki Oishi	def.	(Japan) Shohei Nishibayashi	Decision (Unanimous)	3	3:00	

== K-1 World GP 2020 Winter's Crucial Bout ==
K-1 World GP 2020 Winter's Crucial Bout
- Promotion: K-1
- Date: December 13, 2020
- Venue: Ryōgoku Kokugikan
- City: Tokyo, Japan

K-1 World GP 2020 Winter's Crucial Bout was a kickboxing event held by K-1 on December 13, 2020 at the Ryōgoku Kokugikan in Tokyo, Japan.

=== Background ===
The current Super Welterweight champion Minoru Kimura fought the HEAT Kick Middleweight champion Abiral Ghimire, who was on a five fight winning streak in HEAT. Furthermore, the current Krush 65 kg champion Daizo Sasaki fought Tetsuya Yamato, Fumiya Osawa fought Shuji Kawarada, Yasuto Gunji was expected to fight Yusho Kamemoto, Kouki Sasaki was set to face Rimei Takeshi. Omi Wajima was scheduled to fight Yuhei Fujioka.

Former K-1 Super Featherweight champion Hirotaka Urabe was scheduled to fight Kizaemon Saiga. The fight was contested at Super Featherweight. Former RISE Lightweight and REBELS Super Lightweight champion Fukashi Mizutani was expected to face Hayato Suzuki at Super Lightweight. Hiromi Wajima fought Yuhei Fujioka.

=== Fight Card ===
K-1 World GP 2020 in Tokyo
Weight Class				Method	Round	Time	Notes
Lightweight 62.5 kg	(Thailand) Kongnapa Weerasakreck	def.	(Japan) Kenta Hayashi (c)	Decision (Majority)	3	3:00	For the K-1 Lightweight Championship
Super Welterweight 70 kg	(Brazil) Minoru Kimura	def.	(Nepal) Abiral Himalayan Cheetah	TKO (Doctor Stoppage)	2	2:50	
Catchweight 58.5 kg	(Japan) Kizaemon Saiga	def.	(Japan) Hirotaka Urabe	Disqualification (Low blow)	2		
Super Featherweight 60 kg	(Japan) Yuta Murakoshi	def.	(Japan) Naoki Yamamoto	Decision (Unanimous)	3	3:00	
Super Featherweight 60 kg	(Japan) Ryusei Ashizawa	def.	(Japan) Kotaro Shimano	KO (Punches)	2	3:00	
Lightweight 62.5 kg	(Japan) Taio Asahisa	def.	(Japan) Hikaru Hasumi	KO (Knee to the body)	3	1:48	
Super Lightweight 65 kg	(Japan) Daizo Sasaki	def.	(Japan) Tetsuya Yamato	Decision (Unanimous)	3	3:00	
Lightweight 62.5 kg	(Japan) Shuji Kawarada	def.	(Japan) Fumiya Osawa	Ext.R Decision (Split)	4	3:00	
Super Welterweight 70 kg	(Japan) Hiromi Wajima	def.	(Japan) Yuhei Fujioka	KO (High kick)	1	2:03	
Featherweight 57.5 kg	(Japan) Taito Gunji	def.	(Japan) Yusho Kamemoto	KO (Punches)	2	1:54	
Super Bantamweight 55 kg	(Japan) Junki Sasaki	def.	(Japan) Riamu	Decision (Unanimous)	3	3:00	
Super Lightweight 65 kg	(Japan) Fukashi	def.	(Japan) Hayato Suzuki	KO (Right Cross)	2	3:00	
Preliminary Card
Catchweight 95 kg	(Japan) Shinya Uemura	def.	(Iran) Meisam Eshigi	KO (Left hook)	1	2:55	
Featherweight 57.5 kg	(Japan) Rei Inagaki	def.	(Japan) Hideki	KO (Jumping knee)	3	1:23	
Featherweight 57.5 kg	(Japan) Natsuki Kitamura	def.	(Japan) Seiya	KO (Right Cross)	1	0:33	
Bantamweight 53 kg	(Japan) Eiki Kurata	def.	(Japan) Yuki Toyoda	KO (Punches)	2	2:57	
Featherweight 57.5 kg	(Japan) Yuta Matsuyama	def.	(Japan) Masashige Umeta	TKO (Punches)	1	0:31	

== See also ==
- 2020 in Glory
- 2020 in Kunlun Fight
- 2020 in ONE Championship
- 2020 in Romanian kickboxing
- 2020 in Wu Lin Feng
