= 明博 =

明博 or 명박, meaning 'brilliant, wide', may refer to:

- Akihiro, a masculine Japanese given name
- Myung-bak, a Korean given name for South Korean politician Lee Myung-bak (born 1941)
