= Tomohiro =

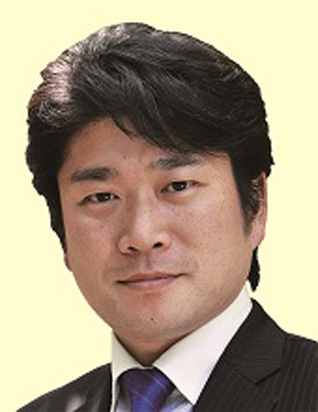
- Tomohiro Yamamoto, Japanese politician
- Pronunciation: tomoçiɾo (IPA)
- Gender: Male

Origin
- Origin: Japanese
- Meaning: Different meanings depending on the kanji used

Tomohiro is a masculine Japanese given name.

== Written forms ==
Tomohiro can be written using many different combinations of kanji characters. Some examples:

- 友弘, "friend, vast"
- 友広, "friend, wide"
- 友寛, "friend, generosity"
- 友博, "friend, doctor"
- 友大, "friend, big"
- 友裕, "friend, abundant"
- 友洋, "friend, ocean"
- 知弘, "know, vast"
- 知広, "know, wide"
- 知寛, "know, generosity"
- 知博, "know, doctor"
- 知大, "know, big"
- 知裕, "know, abundant"
- 智弘, "intellect, vast"
- 智広, "intellect, wide"
- 智寛, "intellect, generosity"
- 智博, "intellect, doctor"
- 共弘, "together, vast"
- 共寛, "together, generosity"
- 朋弘, "companion, vast"
- 朋寛, "companion, generosity"
- 朝弘, "morning/dynasty, vast"
- 朝広, "morning/dynasty, wide"
- 朝大, "morning/dynasty, big"
- 朝洋, "morning/dynasty, ocean"

The name can also be written in hiragana ともひろ or katakana トモヒロ.

== Notable people with the name ==
- Tomohiro Abe (安部 友裕; born 1989), Japanese baseball player
- Tomohiro Anraku (安樂 智大; born 1996), Japanese professional baseball pitcher
- Tomohiro Inoue (井上 智裕; born 1987), Japanese sport wrestler
- Tomohiro Ishii (石井 智宏; born 1975), Japanese professional wrestler
- Tomohiro Ishikawa (石川 知裕; 1973–2025), Japanese politician
- Tomohiro Ito (伊藤 友広; born 1982), Japanese sprinter
- Tomohiro Katō (加藤 智大; 1982–2022), Japanese mass murderer
- Tomohiro Kida (木田 知宏; born 1968), Japanese sport shooter
- Tomohiro Kondo (近藤 智弘; born 1977), Japanese professional golfer
- Tomohiro Matsunaga (松永 共広; born 1980), Japanese freestyle wrestler
- Tomohiro Miyoshi (三好 智弘; born 1970), retired Japanese male butterfly swimmer
- Tomohiro Murata (村田 智弘; born 1981), Japanese shogi player
- Tomohiro Nioka (二岡 智宏; born 1976), Japanese former professional baseball player
- Tomohiro Nishikado (西角 友宏; born 1944), Japanese video game developer
- Tomohiro Nishimura (西村 智博; born 1961), Japanese voice actor, actor, and singer-songwriter
- Tomohiro Noda (野田 明宏; born 1996), Japanese racewalker
- Tomohiro Nomura (野村 智宏; born 1975), Japanese high jumper
- Tomohiro Ogawa (小川 智大; born 1996), Japanese volleyball player
- Tomohiro Okada (岡田 智博), Japanese Director of Creative Cluster
- Tomohiro Tsuboi (坪井 智浩; born 1971), Japanese voice actor
- Tomohiro Tsuda (津田 知宏; born 1986), Japanese football player
- Tomohiro Yamamoto (山本 朋広; born 1975), Japanese politician
- Tomohiro Yamamoto (山本 智大; born 1994), Japanese volleyball player
- Tomohiro Yamanoi (山野井 智広; born 1977), Japanese freestyle swimmer

== See also ==
- 6570 Tomohiro
- 明宏 (disambiguation)
