= Hop diffusion =

Hop diffusion is a non-Brownian diffusion of proteins and lipid molecules within the plasma membrane. Hop diffusion occurs due to the discontinuity of the cell cytoplasmic membrane. According to the fences and pickets model, plasma membrane is compartmentalized by actin-based membrane-skeleton "fences", that occur when cytoplasmic domains collide with the actin-based membrane skeleton; and anchored-transmembrane protein "pickets". Due to these obstacles membrane proteins undergo temporary confinement within 30–700- nm compartments with infrequent intercompartmental hops.

Hops between adjacent compartments occur due to:

- thermal fluctuations of the membrane and following creation of spaces between cytoplasmic membrane layer and cytoskeleton, large enough to allow the passage of integral membrane proteins
- temporal actin filament breakage
- membrane molecules have sufficient kinetic energy to cross the barrier

While simple Brownian diffusion is isotropic and homogeneous, hop diffusion is more complex and combines free diffusion, which occurs inside cell membrane compartments, and infrequent intercompartmental transitions (hops). The complexity of this type of anomalous diffusion is further enhanced due to an inherent broad distribution of compartment sizes.

== See also ==
- Akihiro Kusumi
