= 明宏 =

明宏, meaning 'brilliant, great', may refer to:

- Akihiro, a masculine Japanese given name
- Ming-Hung, a Chinese given name for Taiwanese professional baseball player Tsai Ming-Hung (born 1966)
- Tomohiro, a masculine Japanese given name
