= Fences and pickets model of plasma membrane structure =

Concept and model of cell membrane structure

The picket fence model of plasma membrane is a concept of cell membrane structure suggesting that the fluid plasma membrane is compartmentalized by actin-based membrane-skeleton "fences" and anchored transmembrane protein "pickets". This model differs from older cell membrane structure concepts such as the Singer-Nicolson fluid mosaic model and the Saffman-Delbrück two-dimensional continuum fluid model that view the membrane as more or less homogeneous. The fences and pickets model was proposed to explain observations of molecular traffic made due to recent advances in single molecule tracking techniques.

== Membrane skeleton fence model ==
The actin-based membrane skeleton (MSK) meshwork is directly situated on the cytoplasmic surface of the plasma membrane. Membrane skeleton fence, or membrane skeleton corralling model, suggests that this meshwork is likely to partition the plasma membrane into many small compartments with regard to the lateral diffusion of membrane molecules. Cytoplasmic domains collide with the actin-based membrane skeleton which induces temporary confinement or corralling of transmembrane (TM) proteins in the membrane skeleton mesh. TM proteins are capable to hop between adjacent compartments when the distance between the meshwork and the membrane becomes large enough, or when the meshwork temporarily and locally dissociates. Cytoplasmic molecules located on the inner surface of the plasma membrane also exhibit confinement within actin-based compartments. Recent evidences suggested that different lipid-anchored membrane proteins can undergo dynamic compartmentalization within specific membrane domains, primarily based on their spatially heterogeneous diffusion profiles, even in the absence of actin fences.

== Anchored transmembrane protein picket model ==
The movement of phospholipids, even those located in the outer leaflet of the membrane, is regulated by the actin-based membrane skeleton meshwork. Which is surprising, because the membrane skeleton is located on the cytoplasmic surface of the plasma membrane, and cannot directly interact with the phospholipids located in the outer leaflet of the plasma membrane.

To explain the hop diffusion of phospholipids, consistently with that of TM proteins, a model named "anchored TM-protein picket model" has been proposed. In this model various TM proteins are anchored to and aligned along the membrane skeleton, and effectively act as rows of pickets against the free diffusion of phospholipids. This is due not only to the steric hindrance effect of these picket proteins, but also to the hydrodynamic-friction-like effects of these immobilized TM protein pickets on the surrounding lipid molecules.

When a TM protein is anchored to the membrane skeleton and immobilized, the viscosity of the fluid around it becomes higher, due to hydrodynamic friction effects at the surface of the immobilized protein. Therefore, when there are many such anchored TM proteins aligned along the membrane-skeleton fence, the compartment boundary becomes difficult for membrane molecules to pass through.

Receptor redistribution and clustering are key steps in many signal transduction pathways. Several reports have indicated the active roles played by the cytoskeleton in inhibiting or enabling the redistribution/clustering of membrane molecules. Receptor monomers can hop across the inter-compartment boundaries quite readily, but when they form oligomers, their size increases and consequently their hop rate decreases dramatically. Many receptors and other membrane-associated molecules are temporarily immobilized on actin filaments. This immobilization is often enhanced upon receptor engagement, and constitutes a key step for recruiting the downstream signaling molecule. Meanwhile, the formation of engaged receptor clusters might lead to de novo polymerization of actin filaments at the receptor cluster. As such, the actin-based membrane skeleton might work as a base scaffold for enhancing the interactions between the receptor and the actin-bound downstream molecules and for localized signaling. The pickets and fences made of the membrane skeleton and the anchored transmembrane proteins provide the cell with a mechanism for preserving the spatial information of signal transduction in the membranewhereas pickets would influence both lipids and transmembrane proteins. Pickets influence both lipids and transmembrane proteins traffic, whereas fences mostly influence only transmembrane proteins. Therefore, transmembrane proteins are corralled by both fences and pickets. In both models, membrane proteins and lipids can hop from a compartment to an adjacent one, probably when thermal fluctuations of the membrane and the membrane skeleton create a space between them large enough to allow the passage of integral membrane proteins, when an actin filament temporarily breaks, and/or when membrane molecules have sufficient kinetic energy to cross the barrier when they are in the boundary region.
