= Akihiro Tsukatani =

Japanese composer (1919–1995)

- Born: 16 March 1919; JapanTokyo
- Died: 13 October 1995 (aged 76)
- Other name: 塚谷 晃弘
- Occupations: composer, economist

Akihiro Tsukatani (塚谷 晃弘; 16 March 1919 in Tokyo - 13 October 1995) was a Japanese composer. Among his many compositions are three operas Pongo (1965), Ajatasatru (1966), and Kakitsubata (1967).

== Works ==
Books:

- 『二十世紀の音楽 作曲家と作品』 [Twentieth-century Music: Composers and Works]. 音楽之友社. 1954. JPNO 54009220.
