= Akihiro Tabuki =

Japanese baseball player

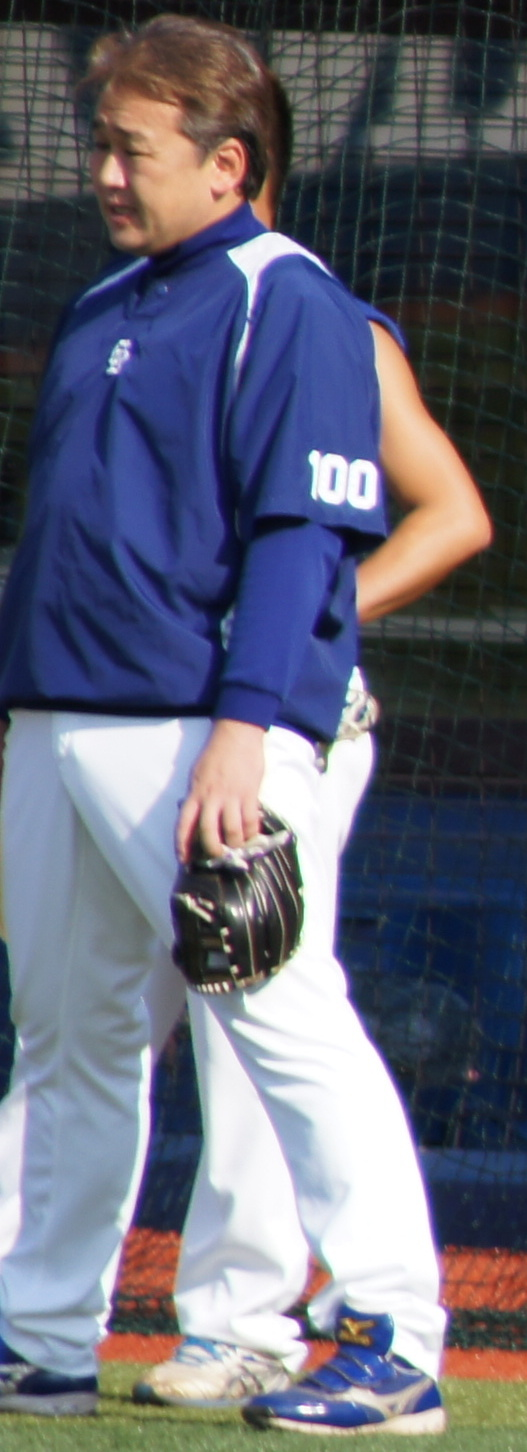
- Pitcher
- Born: June 20, 1971; Nishinomiya, Hyōgo
- Batted: Right Threw: Right

NPB debut
- September 12, 1995, for the Nippon-Ham Fighters

Last appearance
- September 12, 1995, for the Nippon-Ham Fighters

NPB statistics
- Win–loss record: 0–0
- Innings pitched: 2.0
- Strikeouts: 1

Teams
- Nippon-Ham Fighters (1995)

Akihiro Tabuki (田吹昭博, Tabuki Akihiro; born June 20, 1971) is a retired Japanese professional baseball pitcher. He played for the Nippon-Ham Fighters during the 1995 Nippon Professional Baseball season.
