= Akihiro Kusumi =

Japanese biologist

- 楠見 明弘
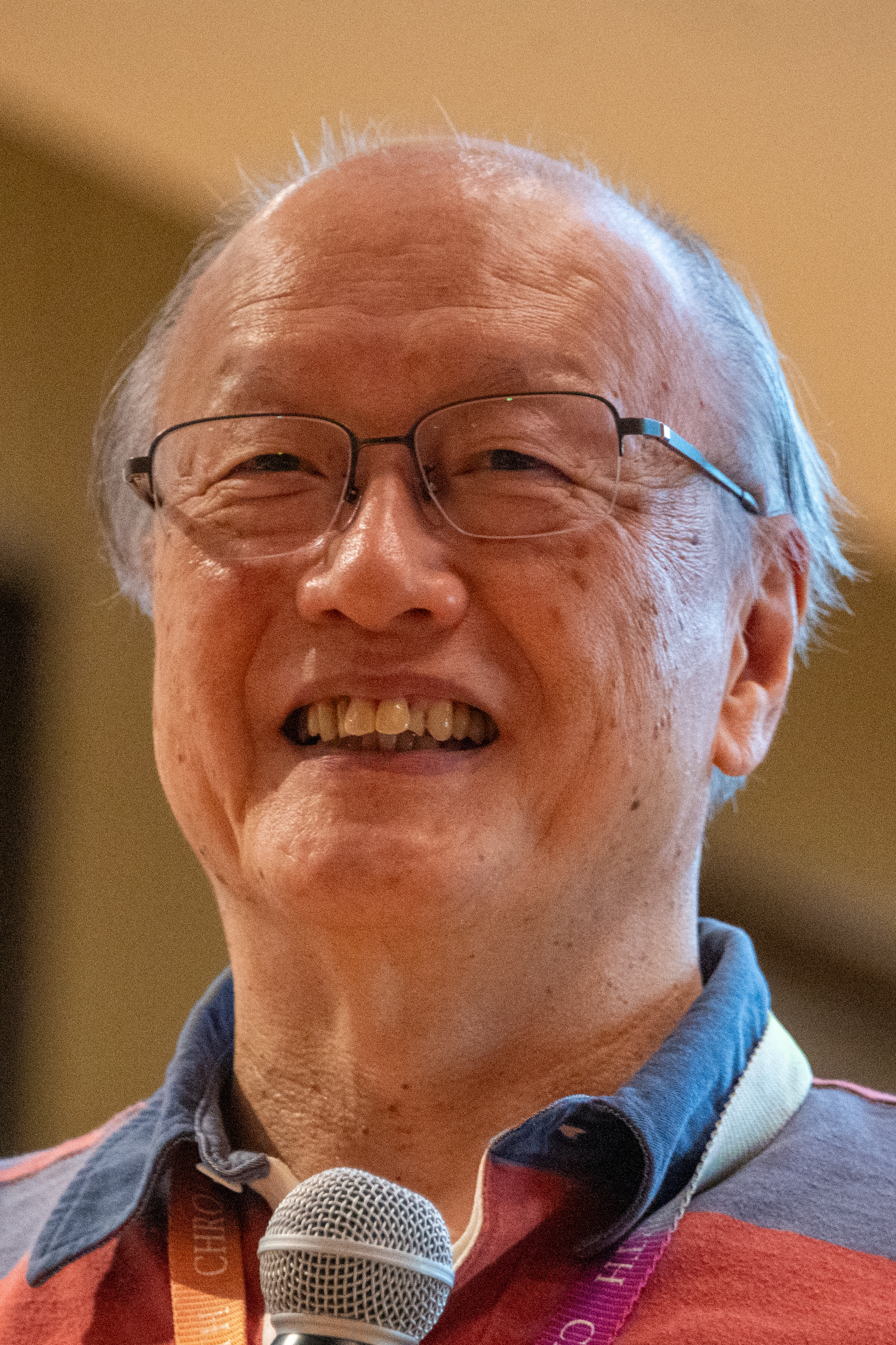
- Kusumi in November 2024
- Born: October 1952 (age 73); Kyoto, Japan
- Education: Kyoto University
- Known for: Proposing the membrane-skeleton fence model to explain hop diffusion
- Scientific career
- Fields: Biophysics, Molecular biology
- Workplaces: Okinawa Institute of Science and Technology (from 2021)

Akihiro Kusumi (楠見 明弘, Kusumi Akihiro; born October 1952) is a Japanese biologist who proposed an explanation for reduced diffusion speed of lipid and protein molecules in the cell membrane, based on a model of hop diffusion in which lipids are confined to a reduced space, created by membrane-skeleton-induced compartments. These compartments allow the lipids or proteins to diffuse freely in a limited region and also limit the diffusion to neighboring compartments on the membrane. Getting to a new compartment is called "hop diffusion" while diffusion in the compartment is allowed by Brownian movement, the compartments of the cell are responsible of the reduced diffusion speed of the lipid or proteins when compared to artificial vesicles.

== Citations ==
- JCB article on "hop diffusion"
- Paradigm shift of the plasma membrane concept from the two-dimensional continuum fluid to the partitioned fluid: high-speed single-molecule tracking of membrane molecules. Annu. Rev. Biophys. struct. 2005. 34:351-78. doi: 10.1146/annurev.biophys.34.040204.144637.
