= Akihiro Kaneko =

Japanese kickboxer

- Born: January 29, 1997 (age 29); Narashino, Japan
- Height: 171 cm (5 ft 7 in)
- Weight: 55.0 kg (121.3 lb; 8.66 st)
- Division: Flyweight
- Style: Kickboxing
- Stance: Orthodox
- Fighting out of: Tokyo, Japan
- Team: K-1 Gym Sangenjaya Silver Wolf / Frog Gym
- Years active: 2014 - present

Kickboxing record
- Total: 32
- Wins: 27
- By knockout: 13
- Losses: 4
- By knockout: 0
- No contests: 1

Other information
- Website: https://akihirokaneko.com/

Akihiro Kaneko (Japanese: 金子晃大, Kaneko Akihiro; born January 29, 1997) is a Japanese kickboxer, currently competing in the super bantamweight division of K-1. A professional competitor since 2016, Kaneko is a former K-1 Super Bantamweight champion and a former Krush Bantamweight champion.

As of August 2023, he is ranked as the fourth best flyweight (-56.7 kg) kickboxer in the world by Combat Press and the fourth best super flyweight (-55 kg) kickboxer by Beyond Kickboxing. He's been ranked in the flyweight top ten by Combat Press continually since September 2020. He was ranked in the strawweight top ten by Combat Press between May 2019 and August 2020.

== Kickboxing career ==
=== Bantamweight career ===
==== Early career ====
Kaneko made his professional debut against Fumiya Hata at Krush 69 on September 30, 2016. He won the fight by a third-round knockout, flooring Hata with a knee to the body, which left him unable to beat the ten count.

Kaneko was scheduled to fight Koki at Krush 72 on January 15, 2017. He won the fight by a third-round knockout. Kaneko dropped Koki with a short left hook early in the third round, before finishing him with a second left hook at the 2:00 minute mark of the last round.

Kaneko faced Naoya Otada at Krush 75 on April 2, 2017. He won the fight by unanimous decision, with all three judges scoring the bout 30–29 in his favor.

Kaneko was scheduled to face Naota Yamada at Krush 77 on July 16, 2017. He won the fight by a second-round knockout.

In his fifth professional fight, Kaneko faced the former BigBang Super Bantamweight champion Taisuke Degai at Krush 82 on November 5, 2017. He won the fight by unanimous decision, with scores of 30–28, 30-28 and 29–28.

==== Krush Bantamweight champion ====
Kaneko was scheduled to challenge the reigning Krush Bantamweight champion Taito Gunji in the co-main event of Krush 89 on June 30, 2018. It was Gunji's first title defense and Kaneko's first major title fight. The fight was ruled a draw, following the first three rounds. The first judge scored the fight 29–28 for Taito, the second judge scored the fight 29–28 for Kaneko, while the third judge scored the fight as an even 29–29 draw. Accordingly, an extension round was fought, which Kaneko won by unanimous decision, with all three judges scoring the fight 10–8 in his favor.

Kaneko made his first title defense against the WPMF bantamweight champion Junya Weerasakreck at Krush 94 on October 28, 2018. He won the fight by a second-round knockout, dropping Junya with a well placed knee to the body. On December 18, 2018, Kaneko vacated the title, as he moved up in weight to super bantamweight.

=== Move up to super bantamweight ===
Kaneko was scheduled to fight Shuhei Kumura at K-1's flagship event K’FESTA 2 on March 10, 2019. The fight was ruled a draw, after the first three rounds were contested, with all three judges scoring the fight an even 29–29. Kaneko had knocked Kumura down once in the second round, but was himself knocked down twice in the second round as well. Kaneko was awarded the unanimous decision after an extra fourth round was fought, with all three judges scoring the fight 10–9 for Kaneko. It was later revealed that Kaneko had suffered a broken hand during the bout.

Kaneko faced Yuta Hayashi at Krush 104 on August 31, 2019. He won the fight by unanimous decision, with scores of 30–28, 30-29 and 30–28.

Kaneko fought the reigning Krush Super Bantamweight champion Masashi Kumura at K-1 World GP 2020: K’Festa 3 on March 22, 2020. Kumura handed Kanko his first professional loss, winning the fight by majority decision, with scores of 30–29, 30-30 and 30–28.

Kaneko was scheduled to fight Momotaro Kiyama at K-1 World GP 2021: K’Festa 4 Day.2 on March 28, 2021. The fight came a year after his loss to Kumura. They were originally scheduled to fight at K-1: K’Festa 4 on January 24, 2021, before the fight was postponed due to the COVID-19 restrictions. Kaneko won the fight by a third-round technical knockout. He knocked Kiyama down in the third minute of the round, after which Kiyama's corner threw in the towel. During the post-fight interview, Kaneko stated his desire to fight for the vacant K-1 Super Bantamweight title.

Kaneko was scheduled to face the former Krush Bantamweight champion Koki at K-1 World GP 2021: Yokohamatsuri on September 20, 2021. The two of them previously fought at Krush.72 on January 15, 2017, with Kaneko winning by a third-round knockout. Kaneko won the fight by a first-round technical knockout. He completely dominated the bout, successfully dropping Koki three times by the 2:35 minute mark the first round.

=== K-1 super bantamweight champion ===
==== Super bantamweight Grand Prix ====
On February 27, 2022, K-1 announced that Kaneko would be one of eight participants in the 2022 Super Bantamweight World Grand Prix, which was held at K-1 World GP 2022 Japan on February 27, 2022. Kaneko faced Yuto Kuroda in the tournament quarterfinals. He won the fight by a third-round knockout. Kaneko first knocked Kuroda down with a counter left hook early in the last round of the bout, before knocking him out with a right straight at the 2:17 minute mark of the third round.

Kaneko advanced to the tournament semifinals, where he faced the reigning Krush Super Bantamweight (-55kg) champion Riamu Sera. He was awarded the automatic technical knockout victory, after knocking Riamu down twice by the 2:23 minute mark. Kaneko first knocked Riamu down with a short left hook, before knocking him down a second time with a low kick. Kaneko faced Masashi Kumura in the finals of the one-day tournament. The bout was a rematch of their March 22, 2020 meeting, which Kumura won by majority decision. Kaneko was more successful in the rematch, winning the fight by majority decision. He knocked Kumura down with a combination of punches in the second round, which proved the pivotal moment of the fight, as it edged the scorecards in his favor.

==== Title reign ====
Kaneko was booked to face the reigning RISE Bantamweight champion Masahiko Suzuki in a non-title bout on June 19, 2022. The bout was scheduled for the undercard of The Match 2022, a RISE and K-1 cross-promotional event, headlined by Takeru Segawa and Tenshin Nasukawa. The event was broadcast by Abema TV as a pay per view. He failed to successfully implement his patented pressure game and lost the fight by majority decision. Two of the judges scored the fight 30–28 and 30–29 for Suzuki, while the third judge scored the bout as an even 29–29 draw.

Kaneko faced Jordan Swinton, the first foreign opponent of his professional career, at K-1 World GP 2022 Yokohamatsuri on September 11, 2022. He won the fight by technical knockout 40 seconds into the opening round. Kaneko knocked Swinton down with a right straight as soon as the bout started, before flooring him with a strike to the body, which left his opponent unable to rise from the canvas. Kaneko next faced Kiriluang Chor.Hapayak at K-1 World GP 2022 in Osaka on December 3, 2022. HE won the fight by a third-round knockout.

Kaneko made his first K-1 Super Bantamweight Championship defense against the former two-weight Lumpinee Boxing Stadium champion Kompetch Sitsarawatsuer at K-1 World GP 2023: K'Festa 6 on March 12, 2023. He won the fight by majority decision, with scores of 30–29, 30–28 and 30–30. During the in-ring post-fight interview, Kaneko called for a trilogy bout with Masashi Kumura.

Kaneko faced the undefeated WAKO-Pro European super bantamweight champion Emre Karaca in a -56 kg catchweight bout at K-1 World GP 2023 in Yokohama on June 3, 2023. He won the fight by a dominant first-round technical knockout. Kaneko was awarded an automatic stoppage victory under the K-1 rules, as he was able to thrice knock Karaca down inside of single round.

Kaneko made his second K-1 Super Bantamweight Championship against the two-time K-1 Super Bantamweight World Grand Prix runner-up Masashi Kumura, whom he beat 17-months prior to capture the belt, at K-1 World GP 2023: ReBOOT～K-1 ReBIRTH～ on September 10, 2023. Kaneko won the trilogy fight by unanimous decision, after an extra fourth round was contested. The contest was ruled a majority decision draw after the first three rounds, with two judges scoring the bout 30–30, while the third ringside official had Kumura ahead 30–29.

Kaneko faced the one-time Glory of Heroes and Wu Lin Feng tournament winner Lan Shanteng in a -56 kg catchweight bout at K-1 ReBIRTH 2 on December 9, 2023. He won the fight by unanimous decision, with scores of 30–27, 30–27 and 30–28.

Kaneko faced the reigning RISE Bantamweight champion Masahiko Suzuki in a cross-promotional bout at RISE ELDORADO 2024 on March 17, 2024. He won the fight by unanimous decision, with three scorecards of 30–25 in his favor. Kaneko was twice able to knock Suzuki down, once in the first and once in the third round.

==== Super bantamweight Grand Prix ====
Kaneko faced national Kun Khmer -54 kg champion Kan Meng Hong in the quarterfinal bout of the 2024 K-1 Super Bantamweight Grand Prix, held at K-1 World MAX 2024 - World Championship Tournament Final on July 7, 2024. He knocked Hong down with a low kick in the opening round, with a right straight in the second round and finally stopped his opponent with a short left hook in the third and final round. Kaneko faced the reigning Krush Super Bantamweight champion Riamu Sera in the semifinals at K-1 World MAX 2024 on September 29, 2024. He won the fight by majority decision, with scores of 30–29, 30–29 and 29–29. Riamu was deducted a point in the final round for repeated clinching. Kaneko faced the one-time Krush Flyweight (-51kg) champion Rui Okubo in the Grand Prix finals. He stopped his opponent with low kicks, 26 seconds into the second round.

==== Continued title reign ====
Kaneko made his third K-1 Super Bantamweight title defense against Manolis Kallistis at K-1 World MAX 2025 on February 9, 2025. He retained the title by unanimous decision.

On February 27, 2025, The Asahi Shimbun reported that the Chiba Prefectural Police had filed an indictment to the Chiba District Public Prosecutor's Office on suspicion that Kaneko had engaged in extortion and assault on an unnamed gym partner. The Chiba District Public Prosecutors Office announced a month later that they would not prosecute Kaneko as there was not enough substantiated evidence to proceed with an indictment.

Kaneko faced the former Krush Bantamweight champion Koji Ikeda in a non-title catchweight bout at K-1 Beyond on May 31, 2025. He lost the fight by majority decision, after suffering a knockdown. The fight was later named the "2025 Upset of the Year" by Beyond Kickboxing.

Kaneko made his fourth K-1 Super Bantamweight title defense against Koji Ikeda at K-1 World MAX 2025 - World Tournament Opening Round on September 7, 2025. He won the fight by unanimous decision, with two scorecards of 29—27 and one scorecard of 29—26 in his favor.

Kaneko was expected to make his fifth K-1 Super Bantamweight title defense against the former Krush Flyweight (-51kg) champion and the 2024 K-1 Super bantamweight (-55 kg) World Tournament runner-up Rui Okubo at K-1 World GP 2026 -90kg World Tournament on February 8, 2026. At the official weigh-ins, Okubo exceeded the weight limit by 1.3 kg. As a result, the bout was converted to a non-title contest. Okubo was also penalized with a two-point deduction at the start of the fight and was required to compete using 10 oz gloves instead of the standard 8 oz gloves. Additionally, Kaneko received 30% of Okubo’s purse. In the days leading up to the bout, Okubo was reportedly in poor physical condition. He had experienced health issues earlier in the month and was hospitalized on February 6 after developing hearing loss and numbness in his extremities. During his final weight cut, he became increasingly unwell and lost consciousness, requiring emergency transport to hospital. Although he later attended the official weigh-in following treatment, he was unable to make the required weight. Despite the apparent advantages, the fight was ruled a 28—28 draw by two of the judges, which meant that an extension round would be contested. Okubo was awarded the victory on the scorecards, but due to his weight miss the bout was declared a no-contest.

== Titles and accomplishments ==
=== Professional ===
- Krush
  - 2018 Krush Bantamweight (-53kg) Champion
    - One successful title defense
- K-1
  - 2018 K-1 Awards Rookie of the Year
  - 2022 K-1 Super Bantamweight World Grand Prix Winner
  - 2022 K-1 World GP Super Bantamweight (-55kg) Champion
    - Four successful title defenses
  - 2022 K-1 Awards Fight of the Year (vs. Masashi Kumura)
  - 2023 K-1 Awards Fighter of the Year
  - 2024 K-1 Super Bantamweight (-55kg) World Tournament Winner
  - 2024 K-1 Awards Skill Award
- Beyond Kickboxing
  - 2023 Beyond Kickboxing "Fight of the Year" (vs. Masashi Kumura)

=== Amateur ===
- K-1
  - 2014 K-1 Amateur Challenge B-Class Super Bantamweight (-55 kg) Runner-up
  - 2014 K-1 Amateur Challenge B-Class Super Bantamweight (-55 kg) Champion
  - 2015 K-1 Amateur Challenge B-Class Super Bantamweight (-55 kg) Champion
  - 2016 K-1 All Japan A-Class Super Bantamweight (-55 kg) Champion & Event MVP

== Kickboxing record ==
Kickboxing record
27 Wins (13 (T)KO's), 4 Losses, 0 Draw, 1 No Contest
Date	Result	Opponent	Event	Location	Method	Round	Time
2026-09-12	Loss	(Japan) Riamu	K-1 World MAX 2026 - World Tournament Opening Round	Tokyo, Japan	Ext.R Decision (Split)	4	3:00
Loses the K-1 Super Bantamweight Championship.
2026-02-08	NC	(Japan) Rui Okubo	K-1 World GP 2026 - 90kg World Tournament	Tokyo, Japan		4	3:00
Okubo misssed weight by 1.3kg. Per K-1 rules Okubo's win by extension round decision became a no contest.
2025-09-07	Win	(Japan) Koji Ikeda	K-1 World MAX 2025 - World Tournament Opening Round	Tokyo, Japan	Decision (Unanimous)	3	3:00
Defends the K-1 Super Bantamweight Championship.
2025-05-31	Loss	(Japan) Koji Ikeda	K-1 Beyond	Yokohama, Japan	Decision (Majority)	3	3:00
2025-02-09	Win	(Greece) Manolis Kallistis	K-1 World MAX 2025	Tokyo, Japan	Decision (Unanimous)	3	3:00
Defends the K-1 Super Bantamweight Championship.
2024-12-14	Win	(Russia) Aslanbek Zikreev	K-1 World Grand Prix 2024 Final	Tokyo, Japan	Decision (Unanimous)	3	3:00
2024-09-29	Win	(Japan) Rui Okubo	K-1 World MAX 2024 - 55 kg World Tournament, Final	Tokyo, Japan	KO (Low kick)	2	0:26
Wins 2024 K-1 Super Bantamweight World Tournament.
2024-09-29	Win	(Japan) Riamu	K-1 World MAX 2024 - 55 kg World Tournament, Semifinals	Tokyo, Japan	Decision (Majority)	3	3:00
2024-07-07	Win	(Cambodia) Kan Meng Hong	K-1 World MAX 2024 - 55 kg World Tournament, Quarterfinals	Tokyo, Japan	KO (Punches)	3	0:55
2024-03-17	Win	(Japan) Masahiko Suzuki	RISE ELDORADO 2024	Tokyo, Japan	Decision (Unanimous)	3	3:00
2023-12-09	Win	(China) Lan Shanteng	K-1 ReBIRTH 2	Osaka, Japan	Decision (Unanimous)	3	3:00
2023-09-10	Win	(Japan) Masashi Kumura	K-1 World GP 2023: ReBOOT～K-1 ReBIRTH～	Yokohama, Japan	Ext.R Decision (Unanimous)	4	3:00
Defends the K-1 Super Bantamweight Championship.
2023-06-03	Win	(Turkey) Emre Karaca	K-1 World GP 2023: inaugural Middleweight Championship Tournament	Yokohama, Japan	KO (3 knockdowns/punches)	1	1:48
2023-03-12	Win	(Thailand) Kompetch Sitsarawatsuer	K-1 World GP 2023: K'Festa 6	Tokyo, Japan	Decision (Majority)	3	3:00
Defends the K-1 Super Bantamweight Championship.
2022-12-03	Win	(Thailand) Kiriluang Chor.Hapayak	K-1 World GP 2022 in Osaka	Osaka, Japan	KO (Left hook)	3	2:38
2022-09-11	Win	(United Kingdom) Jordan Swinton	K-1 World GP 2022 Yokohamatsuri	Yokohama, Japan	KO (Right straight to the body)	1	0:40
2022-06-19	Loss	(Japan) Masahiko Suzuki	THE MATCH 2022	Tokyo, Japan	Decision (Majority)	3	3:00
2022-02-27	Win	(Japan) Masashi Kumura	K-1 World GP 2022 Japan, Super Bantamweight GP Final	Tokyo, Japan	Decision (Majority)	3	3:00
Wins the 2022 K-1 Super Bantamweight World Grand Prix and the vacant K-1 Super Bantamweight (-55kg) title.
2022-02-27	Win	(Japan) Riamu	K-1 World GP 2022 Japan, Super Bantamweight GP Semi Finals	Tokyo, Japan	TKO (2 Knockdown/Low kick)	2	2:23
2022-02-27	Win	(Japan) Yuto Kuroda	K-1 World GP 2022 Japan, Super Bantamweight GP Quarter Finals	Tokyo, Japan	KO (Right cross)	3	2:17
2021-09-20	Win	(Japan) Koki	K-1 World GP 2021: Yokohamatsuri	Yokohama, Japan	TKO (Three knockdowns)	1	2:35
2021-03-28	Win	(Japan) Momotaro Kiyama	K-1 World GP 2021: K’Festa 4 Day.2	Tokyo, Japan	TKO (Corner Stoppage)	3	2:36
2020-03-22	Loss	(Japan) Masashi Kumura	K-1 World GP 2020: K’Festa 3	Saitama, Japan	Decision (Majority)	3	3:00
2019-08-31	Win	(Japan) Yuta Hayashi	Krush 104	Tokyo, Japan	Decision (Unanimous)	3	3:00
2019-03-10	Win	(Japan) Shuhei Kumura	K-1 World GP 2019: K’FESTA 2	Saitama, Japan	Ext.R Decision (Unanimous)	4	3:00
2018-10-28	Win	(Japan) Junya Weerasakreck	Krush.94	Tokyo, Japan	KO (Right Knee to the body)	2	2:20
Defends the Krush Bantamweight (-53kg) title.
2018-06-30	Win	(Japan) Taito Gunji	Krush.89	Tokyo, Japan	Ext.R Decision (Unanimous)	4	3:00
Wins the Krush Bantamweight (-53kg) title.
2017-11-05	Win	(Japan) Taisuke Degai	Krush.82	Tokyo, Japan	Decision (Unanimous)	3	3:00
2017-07-16	Win	(Japan) Naota Yamada	Krush.77	Tokyo, Japan	KO (Right hook)	2	1:00
2017-04-02	Win	(Japan) Naoya Otada	Krush.75	Tokyo, Japan	Decision (Unanimous)	3	3:00
2017-01-15	Win	(Japan) Koki	Krush.72	Tokyo, Japan	KO (Left Hook)	3	2:00
2016-09-30	Win	(Japan) Fumiya Hata	Krush.69	Tokyo, Japan	KO (High Knee)	3	1:36
Legend: Win Loss Draw/No contest Notes

=== Amateur record ===
Amateur Kickboxing record
Date	Result	Opponent	Event	Location	Method	Round	Time
2016-05-22	Win	(Japan) Naoya Otada	K-1 Amateur All Japan A-Class -55 kg Tournament, Final	Tokyo, Japan	KO	1	
Wins K-1 Amateur All Japan A-class -55kg title.
2016-05-22	Win	(Japan) Retsu Akabane	K-1 Amateur All Japan A-Class -55 kg Tournament, Semi Final	Tokyo, Japan	Extra Round Decision	2	2:00
2015-12-06	Win	(Japan) Hisashi Fukushima	K-1 Amateur Challenge B-Class -55 kg Tournament, Final	Tokyo, Japan	Decision (Majority)	2	2:00
Wins K-1 Amateur Challenge B-Class -55kg Tournament title.
2015-12-06	Win	(Japan) Keisuke Takanashi	K-1 Amateur Challenge B-Class -55 kg Tournament, Semi Final	Tokyo, Japan	KO	1	
2015-09-06	Win	(Japan) Hiroki Tsuruta	J-Fight 44	Tokyo, Japan	Decision	2	2:00
2014-12-07	Win	(Japan) Yasuhiro Suzuki	K-1 Challenge 2014 B-Class, Final	Tokyo, Japan	Decision	2	2:00
Wins K-1 Amateur Challenge B-Class -55kg Tournament title.
2014-12-07	Win	(Japan) Yuta Ohno	K-1 Challenge 2014 B-Class, Semi Final	Tokyo, Japan	Decision	1	2:00
2014-12-07	Win	(Japan) Kento Yoshida	K-1 Challenge 2014 B-Class, Quarter Final	Tokyo, Japan	Decision	1	2:00
2014-10-19	Loss	(Japan) Taito Gunji	K-1 Challenge 2014 B-Class, Final	Tokyo, Japan	Decision	1	2:00
For K-1 Amateur Challenge B-Class -55kg Tournament title.
2014-10-19	Win	(Japan) Yasuhiro Suzuki	K-1 Challenge 2014 B-Class, Semi Final	Tokyo, Japan	Extra Round Decision	2	2:00
2014-10-19	Win	(Japan) Issei Ichiki	K-1 Challenge 2014 B-Class, Quarter Final	Tokyo, Japan	Extra Round Decision	2	2:00
2014-07-06	Win	(Japan) Ryuto Watanabe	JAKF SMASHERS 166	Tokyo, Japan	Decision (Unanimous)	2	2:00
2014-06-01	Win	(Japan) Tasuku Sugita	JAKF SMASHERS 165, Final	Tokyo, Japan	Decision	2	2:00
Wins JAKF SMASHERS -55kg Tournament title.
2014-06-01	Win	(Japan) Hitoshi Tanaka	JAKF SMASHERS 165, Semi Final	Tokyo, Japan	Decision	2	2:00
2014-05-18	Win	(Japan) Masaya Kobayashi	JAKF SMASHERS 164	Tokyo, Japan	KO	2	
Legend: Win Loss Draw/No contest Notes

== See also ==
- List of male kickboxers
- List of Krush champions
