= Akihiro Maeda =

Japanese baseball player (born 1983)

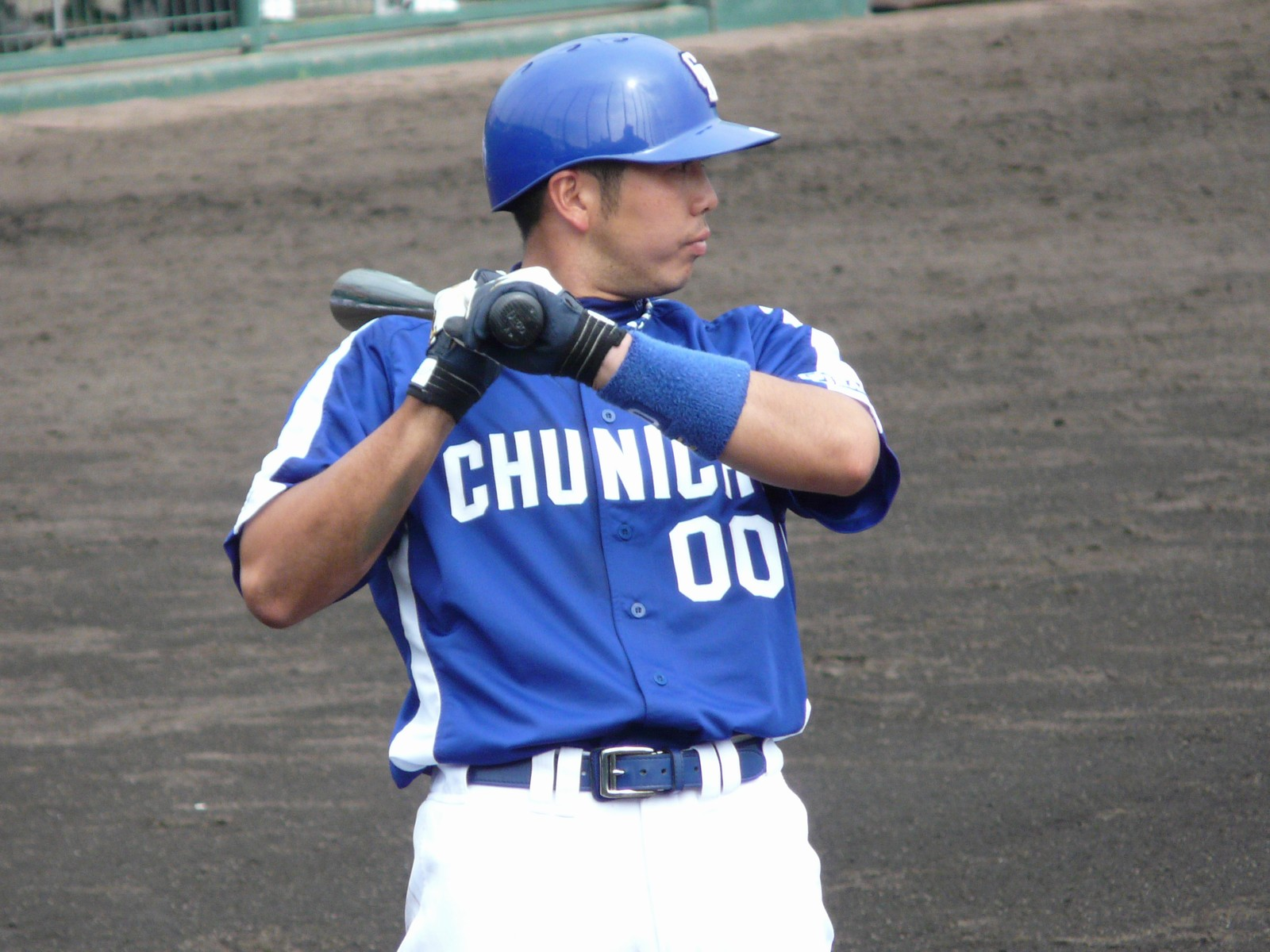
- Catcher / Coach
- Born: June 19, 1983 (age 43); Nagoya, Aichi Prefecture
- Batted: Right Threw: Right

NPB debut
- October 9, 2003, for the Chunichi Dragons

Last NPB appearance
- September 10, 2013, for the Chunichi Dragons

NPB statistics
- Batting average: .070
- Home runs: 0
- Runs batted in: 1
- Stats at Baseball Reference

Teams
- As player: Chunichi Dragons (2003–2006, 2008–2013); As coach: Chunichi Dragons (2014)

Akihiro Maeda (前田 章宏, born June 19, 1983) is a Japanese former professional baseball catcher for the Chunichi Dragons in Japan's Nippon Professional Baseball. He played from 2003 to 2013.
