= Mona Kimura =

Japanese kickboxer and amateur boxer (born 2001)

- Born: 12 April 2001 (age 25); Mizuho, Gifu, Japan
- Height: 1.66 m (5 ft 5 1/2 in)
- Weight: 52 kg (115 lb; 8 st 3 lb)
- Division: Flyweight
- Style: Kickboxing; Boxing; Karate
- Team: K-1GYM MEGURO TEAM TIGER
- Years active: 2024–present

Kickboxing record
- Total: 5
- Wins: 5
- By knockout: 2

Amateur record
- Total: 2
- Losses: 2
- By knockout: 1

Other information
- Boxing record from BoxRec

Mona Kimura (Japanese: 木村 萌那, Kimura Mona; born 12 April 2001) is a Japanese kickboxer and former amateur boxer who is currently signed to K-1. She represented Japan at 2022 IBA Women's World Boxing Championships.

== Early career ==
Kimura started training in karate at age four and won seven consecutive JKJO All Japan Junior Karate Championships, and started boxing in 4th grade. In 2019 she won the JBC Junior Featherweight Championship, and in 2022 competed in the IBA Women's Amateur World Championship but lost her first preliminary match. She also participated in the 2022 All Japan Woman's competition but she failed to win a match there as well. She started training in K1 Kickboxing in April 2024 and worked towards her professional debut.

== Professional career ==
Kimura made her professional kickboxing debut against Ai Ogiwara at Krush 167 on November 16, 2024. She won the fight by a first-round knockout.

Kimura faced Yuka☆ at Krush 170 on January 26, 2025. She won the fight by unanimous decision.

Short videos of her early fights were produced due to her unusual fighting style and attire. Some gamers have compared her fighting style to Chun-Li from the popular video game Street Fighter.

Kimura faced Satoko Ozawa at Krush 177 on June 27, 2025. She won the fight by a second-round technical knockout.

Kimura faced Eun Ji Choi at K-1 GENKI 2026 on April 11, 2026. She won the fight by unanimous decision.

== Championships and accomplishments ==
=== Amateur Boxing ===
- Japanese Boxing Commission
  - (gold) 2019 Japanese Women's Junior National Championships (Feather)

== Fight record ==
Professional Kickboxing Record
5 Wins (2 (T)KOs), 0 Loss, 0 Draws
Date	Result	Opponent	Event	Location	Method	Round	Time
2026-12-29		(Japan) SAHO	K-1 World MAX 2026 - World Championship Tournament Final	Yokohama, Japan			
For the K-1 Women's Flyweight Championship.
2026-09-12	Win	(Switzerland) Marine Nicol	K-1 World MAX 2026 - 70kg World Championship Tournament Opening Round	Tokyo, Japan	Ext.R Decision (Unanimous)	4	3:00
2026-04-11	Win	(South Korea) Eun Ji Choi	K-1 GENKI 2026	Tokyo, Japan	Decision (Unanimous)	3	3:00
2025-06-27	Win	(Japan) Satoko Ozawa	Krush 177	Tokyo, Japan	TKO (referee stop)	2	1:08
2025-01-26	Win	(Japan) Yuka☆	Krush 170	Tokyo, Japan	Decision (Unanimous)	3	3:00
2024-11-16	Win	(Japan) Ai Ogiwara	Krush 167	Tokyo, Japan	KO (right hook)	1	1:32
Legend: Win Loss Draw/No contest Notes

== See also ==
- List of female kickboxers
