= Neigo Katono =

Japanese kickboxer

- Born: September 22, 2006 (age 20); Tokyo, Japan
- Height: 1.67 m (5 ft 5 1/2 in)
- Weight: 53 kg (117 lb; 8.3 st)
- Style: Kickboxing
- Stance: Southpaw
- Fighting out of: Tokyo, Japan
- Team: Power of Dream

Kickboxing record
- Total: 9
- Wins: 9
- By knockout: 6
- Losses: 0

Neigo Katono (上遠野寧吾, Katono Neigo; born September 22, 2006) is a Japanese kickboxer. He is the current K-1 Bantamweight Champion

As of August 2026, Katono was ranked as the 8th best -53 kg kickboxer in the world by Beyond Kickboxing.

== Career ==
=== Krush ===
Katono made his Krush debut on August 18, 2024, at Krush 164. He won the fight by unanimous decision.

On October 25, 2024, Katono faced Ryu Ohira at Krush 166. He won the fight by third round knckout.

On August 23, 2025, Katono entered a tournament for the vacant Krush Flyweight Championship at Krush 179. He faced Toranosuke Higashi in a bout serving as the quarterfinal and won by extension round unanimous decision.

On October 25, 2025, Katono rematched Minagi at Krush 181 as the semifinal of the Krush Flyweight championship tournament. He won the fight by first round knockout.

On December 19, 2025, Katono faced Ryuki Yasuo at Krush 183 for the vacant Krush Flyweight Championship. He won the fight by third round knockout.

=== K-1 ===
Katono made his K-1 debut at K-1 Genki 2026 on April 10, 2026, against Yusei Shirahata. He won the fight via majority decision.

On July 20, 2026, Katono challenged Issei Ishii for his K-1 Bantamweight title at K-1 Dontaku 2026. He won the fight by second round technical knockout.

== Championships and accomplishments ==
- K-1
  - 2026 K-1 Bantamweight (-53 kg) Champion
- Krush
  - 2025 Krush Flyweight (-51.5kg) Champion

== Fight record ==
Muay Thai and Kickboxing record
9 Wins (6 (T)KOs), 0 Losses, 0 Draws
Date	Result	Opponent	Event	Location	Method	Round	Time
2026-12-29		(Japan) Shuto Sato	K-1 World MAX 2026 - World Championship Tournament Final	Yokohama, Japan			
2026-07-20	Win	(Japan) Issei Ishii	K-1 Dontaku 2026	Fukuoka, Japan	TKO (3 Knockdowns)	2	2:46
Wins the K-1 Bantamweight (-53kg) title.
2026-04-10	Win	(Japan) Yusei Shirahata	K-1 Genki 2026	Tokyo, Japan	Decision (Majority)	3	3:00
2025-12-19	Win	(Japan) Ryuki Yasuo	Krush 183	Tokyo, Japan	KO (Right hook)	3	1:24
Wins the vacant Krush Flyweight (-51.5kg) title.
2025-10-25	Win	(Japan) Minagi	Krush 181	Tokyo, Japan	KO (Right hook)	1	2:50
2025-08-23	Win	(Japan) Toranosuke Higashi	Krush 179	Tokyo, Japan	Ext.R Decision (Unanimous)	4	3:00
2024-10-25	Win	(Japan) Ryu Ohira	Krush 166	Tokyo, Japan	KO (Uppercut)	3	1:16
2024-08-18	Win	(Japan) Minagi	Krush 164	Tokyo, Japan	Decision (Unanimous)	3	3:00
2024-05-19	Win	(Japan) Issei Hanazawa	JKA Road To KING 2	Ichihara, Chiba, Japan	KO (Punches)	1	2:59
2024-03-10	Win	(Japan) Yuta Kodera	Bigbang 48	Tokyo, Japan	TKO (High kick)	1	2:16
Legend: Win Loss Draw/No contest Notes

== See also ==
- List of male kickboxers
