= Ryota Ishida =

Japanese kickboxer

- Born: 石田 龍大; November 25, 2002 (age 23); Osaka, Japan
- Height: 173 cm (5 ft 8 in)
- Weight: 57.5 kg (127 lb; 9.05 st)
- Style: Kickboxing, Karate
- Stance: Southpaw
- Fighting out of: Tokyo, Japan
- Team: Power of Dream (2021-Present); Kenshinkaikan (former)
- Trainer: Seiichi Furukawa

Kickboxing record
- Total: 16
- Wins: 14
- By knockout: 7
- Losses: 2
- By knockout: 1

Ryota Ishida (石田 龍大, Ishida Ryota) (born November 25, 2002) is a Japanese kickboxer. He is the current K-1 Featherweight Champion

== Career ==
=== Early career ===
Ishida faced Masaki Takeuchi on February 24, 2024, at Krush 158. He won the fight by second round knockout.

On June 23, 2024, Ishida faced Kyoken Jin at Krush 162. He won the fight by ssecond round knockout.

=== Krush Championship ===
On September 25, 2026, Ishida faced Raita Hashimoto at Krush 165 with the vacant Krush Featherweight title at stake. He won the fight by extension round split decision.

On February 9, 2025, Ishida faced Lyra Nagasaka at K-1 World MAX 2025. He won the fight by unanimous decision.

Ishida sucefully defend his Krush Featherweight title at Krush 174 on May 18, 2025, when he defeated Haruto Matsumoto by second round technical knockout.

On July 13, 2025, Ishida faced Daosayam Wor.Wanchai at K-1 Dontaku. He won the fight by unanimous decision.

On February 28, 2026, Ishida faced Gu Tae Won at Krush 187. He won the fight by third round knockout with a hook to the body.

=== K-1 Championship ===
On May 31, 2026, Ishida faced Kosei Sekiguchi at K-1 Revenge for the vacant K-1 Featherweight title. He won the fight by first round technical knockout after three knockdowns.

== Titles and accomplishments ==
=== Professional ===
- Krush
  - 2024 Krush Featherweight (-57.5kg) Champion
    - One successful title defense
  - 2025 Krush Fight of the Year (vs. Haruto Matsumoto)
- K-1
  - 2026 K-1 Featherweight (-57.5kg) Champion

=== Amateur ===
- 2012 Kyoken Junior Kick Featherweight Champion
- 2014 All Japan Glove Karate Middle School Lightweight Champion
- 2015 All Japan Jr. Kick Tournament -35 kg Runner-up
- 2017 TOP RUN Kansai -40 kg Champion
- 2017 TOP RUN Kansai -45 kg Champion
- 2017 NEXT LEVEL All Japan -45 kg Champion
- 2019 Shin Karate K-3 Grand Prix Lightweight Champion
- 2019 K-1 Koshien West Japan Tournament -60 kg Winner
- 2019 K-1 Koshien -60 kg Champion

== Kickboxing record ==
Professional Kickboxing record
14 Wins (7 (T)KO's), 2 Losses, 0 Draw, 0 No Contest
Date	Result	Opponent	Event	Location	Method	Round	Time
2026-11-23		(Japan) Toma	K-1 Revenge II	Tokyo, Japan			
2026-09-12	Loss	(Japan) Rui Okubo	K-1 World MAX 2026 - World Tournament Opening Round	Tokyo, Japan	KO (Left hook)	3	1:25
Loses the K-1 Featherweight Championship.
2026-05-31	Win	(Japan) Kosei Sekiguchi	K-1 Revenge	Tokyo, Japan	TKO (3 knockdowns)	1	2:48
Wins the vacant K-1 Featherweight (-57.5kg) title.
2026-02-28	Win	(South Korea) Gu Tae Won	Krush 187	Tokyo, Japan	KO (Left hook to the body)	3	0:28
2025-07-13	Win	(Thailand) Daosayam Wor.Wanchai	K-1 Dontaku	Fukuoka, Japan	Decision (Unanimous)	3	3:00
2025-05-18	Win	(Japan) Haruto Matsumoto	Krush 174	Osaka, Japan	TKO (Referee stoppage)	2	1:04
Defends the Krush Featherweight (-57.5kg) title.
2025-02-09	Win	(Japan) Lyra Nagasaka	K-1 World MAX 2025	Tokyo, Japan	Decision (Unanimous)	3	3:00
2024-09-28	Win	(Japan) Raita Hashimoto	Krush 165	Tokyo, Japan	Ext.R Decision (Split)	4	3:00
Wins the vacant Krush Featherweight (-57.5kg) title.
2024-06-23	Win	(Japan) Kyoken Jin	Krush 162	Tokyo, Japan	KO (Punches)	2	2:20
2024-02-24	Win	(Japan) Masaki Takeuchi	Krush 158	Tokyo, Japan	KO (Right hook)	2	2:03
2023-04-28	Win	(Thailand) Kiriluang Chor.Hapayak	Krush 148	Tokyo, Japan	Decision (Unanimous)	3	3:00
2022-12-03	Win	(Japan) Satoshi Tanaka	K-1 World GP 2022 in Osaka	Osaka, Japan	TKO (Punches)	3	1:08
2022-07-30	Win	(Japan) Suizu Sora	Krush 139	Tokyo, Japan	Decision (Unanimous)	3	3:00
2022-03-26	Win	(Japan) Yuki Miyazaki	Krush 135	Tokyo, Japan	KO (Punches)	3	1:53
2021-12-04	Win	(Japan) Takaya Komatsu	K-1 World GP 2021 in Osaka	Osaka, Japan	Decision (Unanimous)	3	3:00
2020-09-22	Loss	(Japan) Naoki Takahashi	K-1 World GP 2020 in Osaka	Osaka, Japan	Decision (Unanimous)	3	3:00
2020-02-24	Win	(Japan) Masaki Yagi	Krush 111	Tokyo, Japan	Decision (Unanimous)	3	3:00
Legend: Win Loss Draw/No contest Notes

=== Amateur record ===
Amateur Kickboxing Record
Date	Result	Opponent	Event	Location	Method	Round	Time
2019-08-04	Win	(Japan) Hiroto Inoue	K-1 Koshien 2019, -60 kg Tournament Final	Tokyo, Japan	Ext.R Decision (Split)	3	2:00
Wins the 2019 K-1 Koshien -60kg Tournament title.
2019-08-04	Win	(Japan) Haru Furumiya	K-1 Koshien 2019, -60 kg Tournament Semi Final	Tokyo, Japan	Decision (Unanimous)	1	2:00
2019-08-04	Win	(Japan) Riku Yabusaki	K-1 Koshien 2019, -60 kg Tournament Quarter Final	Tokyo, Japan	Decision (Unanimous)	1	2:00
2019-07-06	Win	(Japan) Hiroto Inoue	K-1 Koshien 2019 West Japan, -60 kg Tournament Final	Osaka, Japan	Decision (Split)	1	2:00
Wins the 2019 K-1 Koshien West Japan -60kg Tournament title.
2019-07-06	Win	(Japan) Kenshin Kodama	K-1 Koshien 2019 West Japan, -60 kg Tournament Semi Final	Osaka, Japan	Decision (Unanimous)	1	2:00
2019-07-06	Win	(Japan) Kensuke Takao	K-1 Koshien 2019 West Japan, -60 kg Tournament Quarter Final	Osaka, Japan	Decision (Unanimous)	1	2:00
2019-07-06	Win	(Japan) Yuto Kubo	K-1 Koshien 2019 West Japan, -60 kg Tournament First Round	Osaka, Japan	Decision (Unanimous)	1	2:00
2017-12-03	Win	(Japan) Yune Moriyama	NJKF West Japan Young Fight 3rd	Kurashiki, Japan	Decision (Unanimous)	3	2:00
Wins inaugural NEXT LEVEL All Japan -45kg title.
2017-11-12	Win	(Japan) Hiroto Yokoyama	NJKF 2017 west 4th	Osaka, Japan	Decision (Unanimous)	3	2:00
Wins TOP RUN Kansai -45kg title.
2017-09-24	Win	(Japan) Sakuya Ueda	NEXT☆LEVEL Kansai 41	Sakai, Japan	Decision (Unanimous)	2	2:00
2017-05-28	Win	(Japan) Tsukasa Mizoguchi	NEXT LEVEL Kansai 39	Sakai, Japan	Decision (Unanimous)	2	2:00
2017-04-09	Win	(Japan) Tento Nishino	DEEP☆KICK 32	Osaka, Japan	Decision (Unanimous)	3	2:00
Wins TOP RUN Kansai -40kg title.
2017-03-19	Win	(Japan) Kyosuke Fujisawa	NEXT☆LEVEL Kansai 37	Sakai, Japan	Decision (Unanimous)	2	2:00
2017-01-29	Win	(Japan) Naruto Matsumoto	NEXT☆LEVEL Kansai 36	Sakai, Japan	Decision (Unanimous)	2	2:00
2016-12-23	Win	(Japan) Ren Ishihara	NEXT☆LEVEL Kansai 35	Osaka, Japan	Decision (Unanimous)	2	2:00
2016-09-22	Win	(Japan) Kyosuke Fujisawa	NEXT☆LEVEL Kansai 33	Japan	Decision (Unanimous)	2	2:00
2016-08-21	Win	(Japan) Tento Nishino	NEXT☆LEVEL Kansai 32	Japan	Decision (Unanimous)	2	2:00
2016-07-03	Win	(Japan) Tsukasa Mizoguchi	NEXT☆LEVEL Kansai 31	Sakai, Japan	Decision (Split)	2	2:00
2016-05-29	Loss	(Japan) Yuki Hamada	NEXT☆LEVEL Kansai 30	Japan	Decision (Unanimous)	2	2:00
2016-04-29	Win	(Japan) Jin Tanabe	NEXT☆LEVEL Kansai 29	Japan	Decision (Unanimous)	2	2:00
2016-04-29	Loss	(Japan) Yuki Hamada	NEXT☆LEVEL Kansai 29	Japan	Decision (Majority)	2	2:00
2015-03-15	Loss	(Japan) Takaaki Shiba	4th All Japan Jr Kick -35 kg, Final	Japan	Decision		
For the 2015 All Japan Jr Kick -35kg title.
Legend: Win Loss Draw/No contest Notes
