= 2026 in K-1 =

Mixed martial arts events

Information
- First date: February 8, 2026

The year 2026 is the 33rd year in the history of the K-1, a global kickboxing promotion. The year started with the K-1 World GP 2026 -90kg World Championship Tournament. 2026 would see the return of K-1 Revenge, and of Hero's rules MMA matches at K-1 Genki.

== List of events ==
#	Event Title	Date	Arena	Location
1	K-1 World GP 2026 -90kg World Championship Tournament	February 8, 2026	Yoyogi 2nd Gymnasium	Tokyo, Japan
2	K-1 World MAX 2026 in Bucharest	April 3, 2026	Sala Polivalentă	Bucharest, Romania
3	K-1 Genki 2026	April 11, 2026	Yoyogi 2nd Gymnasium	Tokyo, Japan
4	K-1 World MAX 2026 in Melbourne	April 18, 2026	Pullman Albert Park	Melbourne, Australia
5	K-1 World MAX 2026 in Athens	April 18, 2026	Sunel Arena	Athens, Greece
6	K-1 World MAX 2026 in Utrecht	April 19, 2026	Gietijzer Utrecht	Utrecht, Netherlands
7	K-1 World MAX 2026 in Yekaterinburg	April 25, 2026	RMK Martial Arts Academy	Yekaterinburg, Russia
8	K-1 World MAX 2026 in Canary Islands	May 16, 2026	Gran Canaria Arena	Las Palmas, Spain
9	K-1 Revenge	May 31, 2026	Korakuen Hall	Tokyo, Japan
10	K-1 World MAX 2026 in São Paulo	June 21, 2026	Ginásio do Morumbi	São Paulo, Brazil
11	K-1 Dontaku 2026	July 20, 2026	Marine Messe Fukuoka Hall B	Fukuoka, Japan
12	K-1 World GP -90kg Preliminary in Yekaterinburg	August 1, 2026	Archangel Michael Complex	Yekaterinburg, Russia
13	K-1 World MAX 2026 -70kg World Championship Tournament Final 16	September 12, 2026	Yoyogi 2nd Gymnasium	Tokyo, Japan
14	K-1 Fighting Network in Korea 2026	September 19, 2026	Sangju Indoor Gymnasium	Sangju, South Korea
15	K-1 World GP -90kg Qualification in Brasília	September 26, 2026	AABB Brasília	Brasília, Brazil
16	K-1 World GP -90kg Preliminary in Iași	October 9, 2026	Sala Polivalenta Ora	Iași, Romania
17	K-1 World GP -90kg Qualification in Dortmund	October 24, 2026	Helmut-Körnig-Halle	Dortmund, Germany
18	K-1 World GP -90kg Qualification in Melbourne	October 31, 2026	Pullman Albert Park	Melbourne, Australia
19	K-1 World GP -90kg Qualification in Milan	November 7, 2026	Allianz Cloud	Milan, Italy
20	K-1 Fighting Network in Cambodia 2026	TBA		Phnom Penh, Cambodia
21	K-1 World GP -90kg Qualification in Kochi	TBA		Kochi, India
22	K-1 Revenge II	November 23, 2026	Korakuen Hall	Tokyo, Japan
23	K-1 Fighting Network in Armenia 2026	November 27, 2026		Yerevan, Armenia
24	K-1 Fighting Network in France 2026	December 5, 2026	Palais des Sports Dijon	Dijon, France
25	K-1 World GP -90kg Qualification in Paris	December 5, 2026		Paris, France
26	K-1 Fighting Network in Bulgaria 2026	December 12, 2026	Hall Mladost	Burgas, Bulgaria
27	K-1 World GP -90kg Qualification in Abu Dhabi	December, 2026		(United Arab Emirates) Abu Dhabi, UAE
28	K-1 World MAX 2026 -70kg World Championship Tournament Final	December 29, 2026	Yokohama Buntai	Yokohama, Japan

== K-1 World GP 2026 -90kg World Championship Tournament ==
K-1 World GP 2026 -90kg World Championship Tournament
- Promotion: K-1
- Date: February 8, 2026
- Venue: Yoyogi 2nd Gymnasium
- City: Tokyo, Japan
- Attendance: 3,200

K-1 World GP 2026 –90 kg World Championship Tournament was a kickboxing event held by K-1 on February 8, 2026, at the Yoyogi 2nd Gymnasium in Tokyo, Japan.

=== 2026 K-1 -90kg World Championship Tournament bracket ===
Quarter-finals
(Iran) Mahmoud Sattari	1
(Germany) Lukas Achterberg	KO
(Italy) Mattia Faraoni	2
(Romania) Bogdan Stoica	KO
(Morocco) Ibrahim El Bouni	UD
(Brazil) Marco Antonio	3
(Russia) Nikita Kozlov	UD
(Kazakhstan) Aslan Koshiyev	4

Semi-finals
(Germany) Lukas Achterberg	KO
(Romania) Bogdan Stoica	1
(Morocco) Ibrahim El Bouni	3
(Russia) Nikita Kozlov	UD

Final
(Germany) Lukas Achterberg	KO
(Russia) Nikita Kozlov	1

=== Fight Card ===
K-1 World GP 2026 –90 kg World Championship Tournament
Weight Class				Method	Round	Time	Notes
Cruiserweight 90 kg	(Germany) Lukas Achterberg	def.	(Russia) Nikita Kozlov	KO (Low kick)	1	2:19	2026 K-1 -90 kg World Tournament, Final
Super Bantamweight 55 kg	(Japan) Akihiro Kaneko (c)	vs.	(Japan) Rui Okubo	No Contest	4	3:00	for the K-1 Super Bantamweight Championship; Okubo missed weight by 1.3 kg, his win resulted in a no contest
Lightweight 62.5 kg	(Japan) Yuzuki Satomi	def.	(Japan) Hirotaka Asahisa	Ext.R Decision (unanimous)	4	3:00	For the vacant K-1 Lightweight Championship
Heavyweight	(Italy) Claudio Istrate	def.	(Senegal) Babacar Thiatou Yoff	KO (left hook)	1	0:27	
Cruiserweight 90 kg	(Russia) Nikita Kozlov	def.	(Morocco) Ibrahim El Bouni	Decision (unanimous)	3	3:00	2026 K-1 -90 kg World Tournament, Semifinals
Cruiserweight 90 kg	(Germany) Lukas Achterberg	def.	(Romania) Bogdan Stoica	TKO (2 knockdowns)	1	1:46	2026 K-1 -90 kg World Tournament, Semifinals
Middleweight 75 kg	(Brazil) Dengue Silva	def.	(Poland) Kacper Muszyński	KO (punches)	1	2:48	
Middleweight 75 kg	(Senegal) Alfousseynou Kamara	def.	(Guinea-Bissau) Bassó Pires	TKO (punches)	1	1:15	
Cruiserweight 90 kg	(Russia) Nikita Kozlov	def.	(Kazakhstan) Aslan Koshiyev	Ext.R Decision (unanimous)	4	3:00	2026 K-1 -90 kg World Tournament, Quarterfinals
Cruiserweight 90 kg	(Morocco) Ibrahim El Bouni	def.	(Brazil) Marco Antonio	Decision (unanimous)	3	3:00	2026 K-1 -90 kg World Tournament, Quarterfinals
Cruiserweight 90 kg	(Romania) Bogdan Stoica	def.	(Italy) Mattia Faraoni	KO (left hook)	2	2:40	2026 K-1 -90 kg World Tournament, Quarterfinals
Cruiserweight 90 kg	(Germany) Lukas Achterberg	def.	(Iran) Mahmoud Sattari	KO (left hook)	1	0:51	2026 K-1 -90 kg World Tournament, Quarterfinals
Cruiserweight 90 kg	(Philippines) Akira Jr.	def.	(Democratic Republic of the Congo) Gunther Kalunda	Disqualification	3		2026 K-1 -90 kg World Tournament, Reserve
Bantamweight 53 kg	(Japan) Issei Ishii (c)	def.	(China) Zhang Jinhui	Decision (unanimous)	3	3:00	For the K-1 Bantamweight Championship
Women's Atomweight 45 kg	(Mexico) Veronica Rodriguez	def.	(Japan) Kira Matsutani (c)	Decision (unanimous)	3	3:00	for the K-1 Women's Atomweight Championship
Women's Flyweight 52 kg	(Japan) ☆SAHO☆ (c)	def.	(Greece) Sofia Tsolakidou	Decision (unanimous)	3	3:00	for the K-1 Women's Flyweight Championship
Super Featherweight 60 kg	(Japan) Yuta Mastsuyama	def.	(Japan) Chihiro Nakajima	Decision (unanimous)	3	3:00	
Lightweight 62.5 kg	(Japan) Kiyomitsu Samuel Nagasawa	def.	(Japan) Yuma Saikyo	KO (body punches)	1	1:46	
Super Bantamweight 55 kg	(Japan) Futa Hashimoto	def.	(Japan) Koji Ikeda	Decision (majority)	3	3:00	
Featherweight 57.5 kg	(Japan) Eiki Kurata	def.	(Japan) Ryunosuke Saito	Decision (split)	3	3:00	
Preliminary Card
Super Bantamweight 55 kg	(Japan) Sora Amemiya	def.	(Brazil) Mateus Sagae	TKO (Low kicks)	2	3:00	
Super Featherweight 60 kg	(Japan) Musashi	def.	(Japan) Ryuya Fujihara	Decision (majority)	3	3:00	

== K-1 World MAX 2026 in Bucharest ==
K-1 World MAX 2026 in Bucharest
- Promotion: K-1; Dynamite Fighting Show
- Date: April 3, 2026
- Venue: Sala Polivalentă
- City: Bucharest, Romania
- Attendance: 4,500

K-1 World MAX 2026 in Bucharest or DFS 30 was a kickboxing event held in co-promotion by K-1 and Dynamite Fighting Show on April 3, 2026, in Bucharest, Romania.

=== K-1 MAX Bucharest Tournament bracket ===
Quarter-finals
(Romania) Călin Petrișor	3
(Moldova) Vitalie Matei	UD
(Latvia) Mareks Pelcis	SD
(Romania) Ștefan Vrânceanu	3
(Romania) Andrei Varga	1
(Ukraine) Serhii Adamchuk	TKO
(Romania) Albert Enache	TKO
(Turkey) Yıldırım Oğuz	2

Semi-finals
(Moldova) Vitalie Matei	TKO
(Latvia) Mareks Pelcis	1
(Ukraine) Serhii Adamchuk	TKO
(Romania) Albert Enache	2

Final
(Moldova) Vitalie Matei	3
(Ukraine) Serhii Adamchuk	UD

=== Fight Card ===
K-1 World MAX 2026 in Bucharest - Dynamite Fighting Show 30
Weight Class				Method	Round	Time	Notes
Catchweight 95 kg	(Romania) Bogdan Stoica	def.	(Togo) Gerardo Atti	Decision (unanimous)	3	3:00	
Super Welterweight 70 kg	(Ukraine) Serhii Adamchuk	def.	(Moldova) Vitalie Matei	Decision (unanimous)	3	3:00	K-1 World MAX 2026 Qualifier Tournament, Final
Catchweight 77 kg	(Moldova) Constantin Rusu	def.	(Romania) Florin Lambagiu	Decision (unanimous)	3	3:00	
Heavyweight	(Romania) Anatoli Ciumac	def.	(Romania) Ion Grigore	Decision (unanimous)	3	3:00	
Openweight	(Romania) Mihai Zmărăndescu	def.	(Romania) Adi Lupșe	Decision (unanimous)	3	3:00	
Super Welterweight 70 kg	(Ukraine) Serhii Adamchuk	def.	(Romania) Albert Enache	TKO (punches and low kick)	2	2:20	K-1 World MAX 2026 Qualifier Tournament, Semifinals
Super Welterweight 70 kg	(Moldova) Vitalie Matei	def.	(United Kingdom) Mareks Pelcis	TKO (2 knockdowns)	1	1:50	K-1 World MAX 2026 Qualifier Tournament, Semifinals
Catchweight 85 kg	(Romania) Mirel Iacob	def.	(Romania) Costin Dinu	KO (low kick)	2	0:57	
Catchweight 85 kg	(Romania) Aaron Măcăilă	def.	(Ukraine) Yuri Krehul	TKO (referee stoppage)	2	2:04	
Super Welterweight 70 kg	(Romania) Albert Enache	def.	(Turkey) Yıldırım Oğuz	TKO (Low kicks)	2	1:06	K-1 World MAX 2026 Qualifier Tournament, Quarterfinals
Super Welterweight 70 kg	(Ukraine) Serhii Adamchuk	def.	(Romania) Andrei Varga	TKO (2 Knockdowns)	1	2:30	K-1 World MAX 2026 Qualifier Tournament, Quarterfinals
Super Welterweight 70 kg	(United Kingdom) Mareks Pelcis	def.	(Romania) Ștefan Vrânceanu	Decision (split)	3	3:00	K-1 World MAX 2026 Qualifier Tournament, Quarterfinals
Super Welterweight 70 kg	(Moldova) Vitalie Matei	def.	(Romania) Călin Petrișor	Decision (unanimous)	3	3:00	K-1 World MAX 2026 Qualifier Tournament, Quarterfinals
Preliminary Card
Heavyweight	(Romania) Vasile Corcodel	def.	(Romania) Nicola Alin	KO (cross to the body)	2	1:24	
Catchweight 80 kg	(Romania) Edmond Mustafa	def.	(Romania) Emanuel Ciuta	TKO (retirement)	1	3:00	
Catchweight 86 kg	(Romania) Elis Peterneamț	def.	(Romania) Alin Raducu	KO (low kick)	1	2:35	

== K-1 Genki 2026 ==
K-1 Genki 2026
- Promotion: K-1
- Date: April 11, 2026
- Venue: Yoyogi 2nd Gymnasium
- City: Tokyo, Japan
- Attendance: 3,500

K-1 Genki 2026 was a kickboxing event held by K-1 on April 11, 2026, at the Yoyogi 2nd Gymnasium in Tokyo, Japan.

=== Background ===
K-1 Genki was the first event to be produced by new K-1 Producer Genki Sudo, who joined the promotion in September 2025. The event would see the return of mixed martial arts bouts under Hero's rules for the first time since the promotion became defunct in 2008.

=== Fight Card ===
K-1 Genki 2026
Weight Class				Method	Round	Time	Notes
Super Welterweight 70 kg	(Brazil) Jonas Salsicha	def.	(Netherlands) Darryl Verdonk	Decision (unanimous)	3	3:00	For the vacant K-1 Super Welterweight title
Middleweight 75 kg	(Brazil) Dengue Silva	def.	(Senegal) Alfousseynou Kamara	Decision (unanimous)	3	3:00	For the vacant K-1 Middleweight title
Heavyweight	(Brazil) Ariel Machado (c)	def.	(Italy) Claudio Istrate	KO (low kick)	2	1:42	For the K-1 Heavyweight title
Cruiserweight 90 kg	(Germany) Lukas Achterberg	def.	(Switzerland) Fabian Lorito	KO (left hook)	1	2:01	
Super Lightweight 65 kg	(Senegal) Alassane Kamara	def.	(Japan) Daizo Sasaki	TKO (doctor stoppage)	1	2:28	
Karate Middleweight 75 kg	(Japan) Yuto Fukuchi	def.	(Brazil) Vitor Tofanelli	Decision (unanimous)	3	3:00	Full Contact Karate Special Rules
MMA Heavyweight	(Samoa) Mac Papalii	def.	(Senegal) Thiacka Faye	KO (punches)	1	0:33	HERO'S Rules
Women's Flyweight 52 kg	(Japan) Mona Kimura	def.	(South Korea) Eun Ji Choi	Decision (unanimous)	3	3:00	
Featherweight 57.5 kg	(Japan) Rui Okubo	def.	(Japan) Takahito Niimi	Decision (majority)	3	3:00	
Super Featherweight 60 kg	(Japan) Narufumi Nishimoto	def.	(Japan) Yuki Egawa	Decision (unanimous)	3	3:00	
Bantamweight 53 kg	(Japan) Kojiro Shiba	def.	(Japan) Eito Kurokawa	KO (Left cross)	3	2:27	
Bantamweight 53 kg	(Japan) Neigo Katono	def.	(Japan) Yusei Shirahata	Decision (majority)	3	3:00	
Featherweight 57.5 kg	(Japan) Ryunosuke Saito	def.	(Japan) Lyra Nagasaka	KO (Punches)	2	1:31	
Super Bantamweight 55 kg	(Japan) Kengo Murata	def.	(Japan) Haruto	KO (Left hook)	2	0:23	
Women's Flyweight 52 kg	(Japan) Noriko Ikeuchi	def.	(Japan) Melty Kira	Decision (unanimous)	3	3:00	
Featherweight 57.5 kg	(Japan) Eiki Kurata	def.	(Japan) Kokoro Terashima	Decision (unanimous)	3	3:00	
Preliminary Card
Super Bantamweight 55 kg	(Japan) Hiroto	def.	(Japan) Tyson Suzuki	Decision (unanimous)	3	3:00	
Lightweight 62.5 kg	(Japan) Naoki Inose	def.	(Japan) Sera	TKO (referee stoppage)	2	2:10	

== K-1 World MAX 2026 in Melbourne ==
K-1 World MAX 2026 in Melbourne
- Promotion: K-1; Iron Lion Promotions
- Date: April 18, 2026
- Venue: Pullman Albert Park
- City: Melbourne, Australia
- Attendance: 1,000

K-1 World MAX 2026 in Melbourne or Spartans Cup Championships 26 was a kickboxing event held in co-promotion by K-1 and Iron Lion Promotions on April 18, 2026, in Melbourne, Australia.

=== K-1 MAX Australia Tournament bracket ===
Semi-finals
(Australia) Jacob Mikula	3
(New Zealand) Preston Te Moni	SD
(Australia) Zack Pankhurst	TKO
(New Zealand) Conor Rock	2

Final
(New Zealand) Preston Te Moni	3
(Australia) Zack Pankhurst	TKO

=== Fight Card ===
K-1 World MAX 2026 in Melbourne - Spartans Cup Championships 26
Weight Class				Method	Round	Time	Notes
Super Welterweight 70 kg	(Australia) Zack Pankhurst	def.	(New Zealand) Preston Te Moni	TKO	3	1:52	K-1 World MAX 2026 Qualifier Tournament, Final
Catchweight 84 kg	(Australia) Charlie Bubb	draw.	(Germany) Robert Stoll	Decision (majority)	5	3:00	For the vacant SCC World 84 kg title
Super Welterweight 70 kg	(Samoa) Jonathan Aiulu	def.	(Morocco) Mohammed Hdidi	Decision (Unanimous)	5	3:00	For the vacant SCC World 70 kg title
Catchweight 64 kg	(Australia) Zoe Putorak	def.	(Australia) Michaela Jenkins	Decision (unanimous)	5	3:00	For the vacant SCC World 64 kg title
Catchweight 61 kg	(Australia) Melisa Murselovic	def.	(New Zealand) Deanne Philpott	Decision (unanimous)	3	3:00	For the vacant SCC South Pacific 61 kg title
Super Welterweight 70 kg	(Australia) Zack Pankhurst	def.	(New Zealand) Conor Rock	TKO	2		K-1 World MAX 2026 Qualifier Tournament, Semifinals
Super Welterweight 70 kg	(New Zealand) Preston Te Moni	def.	(Australia) Jacob Mikula	Decision (split)	3	3:00	K-1 World MAX 2026 Qualifier Tournament, Semifinals
Catchweight 66 kg	(Australia) Kohei Hatanaka	def.	(Australia) Cas Haberfeild	Decision (unanimous)	3	3:00	
Catchweight 79 kg	(Australia) Santo Joma	def.	(Australia) David McDonald	KO			For the vacant SCC Australia 79 kg title
Super Featherweight 60 kg	(New Zealand) Wendy Talbott	draw.	(Australia) Fleur Waru	Decision (unanimous)	3	3:00	For the vacant SCC World 61.5 kg title
Boxing 72.5 kg	(New Zealand) Dylan Birdo	def.	(Indonesia) Laurensius Lowa	KO	4		For the vacant WBC Australasian 72.5 kg title
Catchweight 57 kg	(Australia) Sylvana Touma Nassour	def.	(Australia) Kaitlin Halcrow	Decision (unanimous)	3	3:00	
Catchweight 92 kg	(Australia) Visesio Saina	def.	(Australia) Brad Davies	TKO	2	1:56	
Catchweight 79 kg	(Australia) Noah Hamilton	def.	(New Zealand) Tahuri Taniwha	Decision (unanimous)	3	3:00	

== K-1 World MAX 2026 in Athens ==
K-1 World MAX 2026 in Athens
- Promotion: K-1; Spartan's Night
- Date: April 18, 2026
- Venue: Sunel Arena
- City: Athens, Greece
- Attendance: 3,000

K-1 World MAX 2026 in Athens or Spartan's Night VI was a kickboxing event held in co-promotion by K-1 and Spartan's Night on April 18, 2026, in Athens, Greece.

=== K-1 MAX Greece Tournament bracket ===
Semi-finals
(Greece) Achilleas Karapiperis	KO
(Greece) Christos Michaloutsos	1
(Greece) Pantelis Samprovalakis	3
(Greece) Nikolaos Livanos	UD

Final
(Greece) Achilleas Karapiperis	UD
(Greece) Nikolaos Livanos	3

=== Fight Card ===
K-1 World MAX 2026 in Athens - Spartan's Night VI
Weight Class				Method	Round	Time	Notes
Super Welterweight 70 kg	(Greece) Achilleas Karapiperis	def.	(Greece) Nikolaos Livanos	Decision (unanimous)	3	3:00	K-1 World MAX 2026 Qualifier Tournament, Final
Catchweight 77 kg	(Greece) Nikos Tzotzos	def.	(United States) Omar Moreno	Decision (unanimous)	3	3:00	
Catchweight	(Greece) Savvas Kagkelidis	def.	(Denmark) Magnus Lazrak Vadsholt	KO			
Catchweight 62 kg	(Greece) Nikolaos Panoy	def.	(Thailand) Chatmongkon Rarangsit	Decision (unanimous)	3	3:00	
Catchweight 67 kg	(Greece) Soumpakas Evaggelos	def.	(Greece) Angelos Kaponis	Decision (unanimous)	3	3:00	
Super Welterweight 70 kg	(Greece) Pavlos Mihasi	def.	(Greece) Avraam Chatzigeorgiou	Ext.R Decision (split)	4	3:00	K-1 World MAX 2026 Qualifier Tournament, reserve
Super Welterweight 70 kg	(Greece) Nikolaos Livanos	def.	(Greece) Pantelis Samprovalakis	Decision (unanimous)	3	3:00	K-1 World MAX 2026 Qualifier Tournament, Semifinals
Super Welterweight 70 kg	(Greece) Achilleas Karapiperis	def.	(Greece) Christos Michaloutsos	KO (Head kick)	1	1:19	K-1 World MAX 2026 Qualifier Tournament, Semifinals
Catchweight 81 kg	(Greece) Chiotis Dimitris	def.	(Cyprus) Vasilis Afanasov	Decision (unanimous)	3	3:00	
Catchweight	(Bulgaria) Kiril Dimitrov	def.	(Greece) Nikos Marantidis	Decision (split)	3	3:00	
Catchweight	(Greece) Savvas Lefkopoulos	def.	(Greece) Ion Papadopoulos	KO	3		

== K-1 World MAX 2026 in Utrecht ==
K-1 World MAX 2026 in Utrecht
- Promotion: K-1; World Fighting League
- Date: April 19, 2026
- Venue: Gietijzer Utrecht
- City: Utrecht, Netherlands
- Attendance: 1,500

K-1 World MAX 2026 in Utrecht or World Fighting League was a kickboxing event held in co-promotion by K-1 and World Fighting League on April 19, 2026, in Utrecht, Netherlands.

=== K-1 MAX Utrecht Tournament bracket ===
Quarter-finals
(Netherlands) Mitchell Lammers	UD
(Ukraine) Stanislav Kazantsev	3R.
(Brazil) Manoel Dos Santos	TKO
(Italy) Francesco Carbotti	3R.
(Turkey) Semih Keskin	SD
(Morocco) Hakim Tato	3R.
(Netherlands) Joey Klijenburg	1R.
(Netherlands) Jayjay Morris	TKO

Semi-finals
(Netherlands) Mitchell Lammers	KO
(Brazil) Manoel Dos Santos	1R.
(Turkey) Semih Keskin	3R.
(Netherlands) Jayjay Morris	UD

Final
(Netherlands) Mitchell Lammers	1R.
(Netherlands) Jayjay Morris	KO

=== Fight Card ===
K-1 World MAX 2026 in Utrecht - World Fighting League
Weight Class				Method	Round	Time	Notes
Super Welterweight 70 kg	(Netherlands) Jayjay Morris	def.	(Netherlands) Mitchell Lammers	KO (knee to the head)	1	2:43	K-1 World MAX 2026 Qualifier Tournament, Final
Middleweight 75 kg	(Democratic Republic of the Congo) Christian Baya	def.	(United Kingdom) Jamie Bates	Decision (unanimous)	5	3:00	For the World Fighting League 75 kg title
Super Welterweight 70 kg	(Netherlands) Jayjay Morris	def.	(Turkey) Semih Keskin	Decision (unanimous)	3	3:00	K-1 World MAX 2026 Qualifier Tournament, Semifinals
Super Welterweight 70 kg	(Netherlands) Mitchell Lammers	def.	(Brazil) Manoel Dos Santos	KO	1	2:32	K-1 World MAX 2026 Qualifier Tournament, Semifinals
Catchweight 77 kg	(Netherlands) Jay Overmeer	def.	(Italy) Yassin Rezgui	Decision (unanimous)	3	3:00	
Catchweight 77 kg	(Suriname) Jahfaro Gezius	def.	(Suriname) Guevero Nijhove	KO (right hook)	1	1:56	
	(Portugal) Thiago Santos	def.	(France) Pavel Robert	TKO (knee to the body)	1		
Super Welterweight 70 kg	(Netherlands) Jayjay Morris	def.	(Netherlands) Joey Klijenburg	TKO (doctor stoppage)	1	3:00	K-1 World MAX 2026 Qualifier Tournament, Quarterfinals
Super Welterweight 70 kg	(Turkey) Semih Keskin	def.	(Morocco) Hakim Tato	Decision (split)	3	3:00	K-1 World MAX 2026 Qualifier Tournament, Quarterfinals
Super Welterweight 70 kg	(Brazil) Manoel Dos Santos	def.	(Italy) Francesco Carbotti	KO	3	2:59	K-1 World MAX 2026 Qualifier Tournament, Quarterfinals
Super Welterweight 70 kg	(Netherlands) Mitchell Lammers	def.	(Ukraine) Stanislav Kazantsev	Decision (unanimous)	3	3:00	K-1 World MAX 2026 Qualifier Tournament, Quarterfinals

== K-1 World MAX 2026 in Yekaterinburg ==
K-1 World MAX 2026 in Yekaterinburg
- Promotion: K-1; RCC Promotions
- Date: April 25, 2026
- Venue: RMK Martial Arts Academy
- City: Yekaterinburg, Russia

K-1 World MAX 2026 in Yekaterinburg or RCC Fair Fight 35 was a kickboxing event held in co-promotion by K-1 and RCC on April 25, 2026, in Yekaterinburg, Russia.

=== K-1 MAX Yekaterinburg Tournament bracket ===
Quarter-finals
(Russia) Eduard Fatykov	TKO
(Belarus) Pavel Grishanovich	3
(Russia) Vladimir Tulaev	UD
(Azerbaijan) Ruslan Nagiyev	3
(Russia) Andrey Elin	1
(Russia) Rostislav Varnavsky	TKO
(Russia) Vasilii Semenov	UD
(Azerbaijan) Takhmasib Kerimov	3

Semi-finals
(Russia) Eduard Fatykov	2
(Russia) Vladimir Tulaev	TKO
(Russia) Rostislav Varnavsky	Ext.R
(Azerbaijan) Ruslan Nagiyev^{1}	4

Final
(Russia) Vladimir Tulaev	UD
(Russia) Rostislav Varnavsky	3

^{1} Vasilii Semenov withdrew from the semifinals due to injury and was replaced by losing quarterfinalist Ruslan Nagiyev.

=== Fight Card ===
K-1 World MAX 2026 in Yekaterinburg - RCC Fair Fight 35
Weight Class				Method	Round	Time	Notes
Super Welterweight 70 kg	(Russia) Vladimir Tulaev	def.	(Russia) Rostislav Varnavsky	Decision (unanimous)	3	3:00	K-1 World MAX 2026 Qualifier Tournament, Final
Heavyweight	(Russia) Maxim Baklanov	def.	(Belarus) Alexey Kudin	TKO (referee stoppage)	2	2:48	For the vacant RCC Fair Fight Heavyweight title
Catchweight 93 kg	(Russia) Ivan Petrenko	def.	(Brazil) Marco Black Diamond	Decision (unanimous)	3	3:00	
Super Lightweight 65 kg	(Russia) Amirkhan Zakriev	def.	(Russia) Robert Kazikhanov	Ext.R Decision	4	3:00	
Super Welterweight 70 kg	(Russia) Rostislav Varnavsky	def.	(Azerbaijan) Ruslan Nagiyev	Ext.R Decision	4	3:00	K-1 World MAX 2026 Qualifier Tournament, Semifinals
Super Welterweight 70 kg	(Russia) Vladimir Tulaev	def.	(Russia) Eduard Fatykov	TKO (left hook)	2	1:36	K-1 World MAX 2026 Qualifier Tournament, Semifinals
Catchweight 53 kg	(China) Li Lishan	def.	(Russia) Kristina Purgina	Ext.R Decision	4	3:00	
Catchweight 77 kg	(Russia) Ruslan Kiselev	def.	(Russia) Andrey Meshkov	TKO (retirement)	2	3:00	
Super Welterweight 70 kg	(Russia) Khiramagomed Aliev	def.	(Russia) Andrey Avdeev	KO (left hook)	2	1:20	K-1 World MAX 2026 Qualifier Tournament, reserve
Super Welterweight 70 kg	(Russia) Vasilii Semenov	def.	(Azerbaijan) Takhmasib Kerimov	Decision (unanimous)	3	3:00	K-1 World MAX 2026 Qualifier Tournament, Quarterfinals
Super Welterweight 70 kg	(Russia) Rostislav Varnavsky	def.	(Russia) Andrey Elin	TKO (punches)	1	2:03	K-1 World MAX 2026 Qualifier Tournament, Quarterfinals
Super Welterweight 70 kg	(Russia) Vladimir Tulaev	def.	(Azerbaijan) Ruslan Nagiyev	Decision (unanimous)	3	3:00	K-1 World MAX 2026 Qualifier Tournament, Quarterfinals
Super Welterweight 70 kg	(Russia) Eduard Fatykov	def.	(Belarus) Pavel Grishanovich	TKO (2 knockdowns)	3	2:18	K-1 World MAX 2026 Qualifier Tournament, Quarterfinals
Catchweight 73 kg	(Belarus) Dmitry Bobko	def.	(Russia) Andrey Podgornov	Ext.R Decision (unanimous)	4	3:00	

== K-1 World MAX 2026 in Canary Islands ==
K-1 World MAX 2026 in Canary Islands
- Promotion: K-1; Fight Events
- Date: May 16, 2026
- Venue: Gran Canaria Arena
- City: Las Palmas, Spain

K-1 World MAX 2026 in Canary Islands was a kickboxing event held in co-promotion by K-1 and Fight Events on May 16, 2026, in Las Palmas, Spain.

=== K-1 MAX Spain Tournament bracket ===
Semi-finals
(Spain) Sergio Sanchez	KO
(France) Alan Lévêque	3
(Spain) Alcorac Caballero	Ex
(Portugal) Fabio Veiga	KO

Final
(Spain) Sergio Sanchez	DEC
(Portugal) Fabio Veiga	Ex

=== Fight Card ===
K-1 World MAX 2026 in Canary Islands
Weight Class				Method	Round	Time	Notes
Super Welterweight 70 kg	(Spain) Sergio Sanchez	def.	(Portugal) Fabio Veiga	Ext.R Decision	4	3:00	K-1 World MAX 2026 Qualifier Tournament, Final
Catchweight 81 kg	(Guinea) Germain Kpoghomou	def.	(Spain) Damian Martín	TKO (punches)	2	1:03	
Super Lightweight 65 kg	(Spain) Sergio Alcaide	def.	(Spain) Antonio Campoy	TKO	3		
Super Welterweight 70 kg	(Portugal) Fabio Veiga	def.	(Spain) Alcorac Caballero	KO (knee to the body)	4	0:34	K-1 World MAX 2026 Qualifier Tournament, Semifinals
Super Welterweight 70 kg	(Spain) Sergio Sanchez	def.	(France) Alan Lévêque	KO (body punch)	3	1:44	K-1 World MAX 2026 Qualifier Tournament, Semifinals
Catchweight 86 kg	(Portugal) Romăo Paz	def.	(Spain) Rafa Cazorla	Decision (unanimous)	3	3:00	
Middelweight 75 kg	(Spain) Jordi Requejo	def.	(Spain) Dorian Padrón	Decision	3	3:00	
Middleweight 75 kg	(Morocco) Jamal Raad	def.	(Spain) Fernando Martin	Decision	3	3:00	
Preliminary Card
Catchweight 57 kg	(Spain) Cynthia Curquejo	def.	(Spain) Cynthya Monzon	Decision	3	3:00	
Catchweight 69 kg	(Spain) Alejandro Delgado	def.	(Spain) Marco Betancourt	Decision	3	3:00	
Catchweight 83 kg	(Spain) Aythami Medina	vs.	(Dominican Republic) Bryan Cruz				

== K-1 Revenge ==
K-1 Revenge
- Promotion: K-1
- Date: May 31, 2026
- Venue: Korakuen Hall
- City: Tokyo, Japan

K-1 Revenge was a kickboxing event held by K-1 on May 31, 2026, in Tokyo, Japan.

=== Background ===
The original K-1 Revenge event was held on September 18, 1994, and would be a reoccurring event that was held up until K-1 Revenge Oceania on May 14, 2000. The 2026 event was the first to be held in twenty-six years, the first to be produced by current owner M-1 Sports Media, and the sixth K-1 Revenge event overall.

=== Fight Card ===
K-1 Revenge
Weight Class				Method	Round	Time	Notes
Cruiserweight 90 kg	(Iran) Mahmoud Sattari	def.	(Kazakhstan) Aslan Koshiyev	Decision (unanimous)	3	3:00	
Middleweight 75 kg	(Poland) Kacper Muszyński	def.	(Japan) Seiya Tanigawa	KO (punches)	1	0:49	
Super Featherweight 60 kg	(Japan) Tomoya Yokoyama	def.	(Japan) Yuta Matsuyama	KO (left cross)	1	2:21	For the interim K-1 Super Featherweight title
Featherweight 57.5 kg	(Japan) Ryota Ishida	def.	(Japan) Kosei Sekiguchi	TKO (3 knockdowns)	1	2:48	For the vacant K-1 Featherweight title
Super Featherweight 60 kg	(Japan) Tadashi Kaneko	def.	(Japan) Kazuhiro Hirakawa	Decision (unanimous)	2	2:00	Special Masters fight
Lightweight 62.5 kg	(Japan) Samuel Kiyomitsu Nagasawa	def.	(Japan) Tatsuya Oiwa	Decision (unanimous)	3	3:00	
Super Bantamweight 55 kg	(Japan) Riamu	def.	(Japan) Riku Otsu	Decision (unanimous)	3	3:00	
Super Bantamweight 55 kg	(Japan) Koji Ikeda	def.	(Japan) Kazuki Fujita	KO (knee to the body)	1	0:58	
Super Featherweight 60 kg	(Japan) Ryusho	def.	(Japan) Hayato Onodera	Decision (majority)	3	3:00	

== K-1 World MAX 2026 in São Paulo ==
K-1 World MAX 2026 in São Paulo
- Promotion: K-1; WGP Kickboxing
- Date: June 21, 2026
- Venue: Ginásio do Morumbi
- City: São Paulo, Brazil

K-1 World MAX 2026 in São Paulo - South American Round was a kickboxing event held in co-promotion by K-1 and WGP Kickboxing on June 21, 2026, in São Paulo, Brazil.

=== K-1 MAX São Paulo Tournament bracket ===
Quarter-finals
(Brazil) André Martins	SD
(Argentina) Fernando Amaya	3
(Brazil) Jones Coliseu	UD
(Argentina) Matias Garcia	3
(Brazil) Mateus Machado	MD
(Brazil) Heliazir Estefani	Ex.R
(Brazil) Marcio De Jesus	3
(Paraguay) Ariel Villalba	UD

Semi-finals
(Brazil) André Martins	UD
(Brazil) Mateus Machado	3
(Paraguay) Ariel Villalba	3
(Brazil) Jones Coliseu	UD

Final
(Brazil) André Martins	3
(Brazil) Jones Coliseu	UD

=== Fight Card ===
K-1 World MAX 2026 in São Paulo - WGP Kickboxing
Weight Class				Method	Round	Time	Notes
Super Welterweight 70 kg	(Brazil) Jones Coliseu	def.	(Brazil) André Martins	Decision (unanimous)	3	3:00	K-1 World MAX 2026 Qualifier Tournament, Final
Catchweight 78.1 kg	(Brazil) Lucas Rafael	def.	(Brazil) Marcos Carvalho (c)	KO (Low kick)	4	0:49	For the WGP Kickboxing Super Middleweight title
Super Welterweight 70 kg	(Brazil) Jones Coliseu	def.	(Paraguay) Ariel Villalba	Decision (unanimous)	3	3:00	K-1 World MAX 2026 Qualifier Tournament, Semifinals
Super Welterweight 70 kg	(Brazil) André Martins	def.	(Brazil) Mateus Machado	Decision (unanimous)	3	3:00	K-1 World MAX 2026 Qualifier Tournament, Semifinals
Catchweight 61 kg	(Argentina) Leo Corrales	def.	(Brazil) Matheus Vinicius	Decision (split)	3	3:00	
Catchweight 61 kg	(Brazil) Paulo Sergipe	def.	(Paraguay) Teodoro Ruiz	Decision (split)	3	3:00	
Super Welterweight 70 kg	(Brazil) Mateus Machado	def.	(Brazil) Heliazir Estefani	Ext.R Decision (majority)	4	3:00	K-1 World MAX 2026 Qualifier Tournament, Quarterfinals
Super Welterweight 70 kg	(Paraguay) Ariel Villalba	def.	(Brazil) Marcio De Jesus	Decision (unanimous)	3	3:00	K-1 World MAX 2026 Qualifier Tournament, Quarterfinals
Super Welterweight 70 kg	(Brazil) Jones Coliseu	def.	(Argentina) Matias Garcia	Decision (unanimous)	3	3:00	K-1 World MAX 2026 Qualifier Tournament, Quarterfinals
Super Welterweight 70 kg	(Brazil) André Martins	def.	(Argentina) Fernando Amaya	Ext.R Decision (split)	4	3:00	K-1 World MAX 2026 Qualifier Tournament, Quarterfinals
Preliminary Card
Super Welterweight 70 kg	(Brazil) Thel Henrique	def.	(Bolivia) Aaron Alvarez	Decision (unanimous)	3	3:00	K-1 World MAX 2026 Qualifier Tournament, reserve
Catchweight 61.2 kg	(Brazil) Jaqueline Pesadão	def.	(Brazil) Roberta Tanque	KO	2		
Catchweight 61.2 kg	(Brazil) Watson de Castro	def.	(Brazil) Jackson Elitelmo	Decision (split)	3	3:00	
Women's Flyweight 52 kg	(Brazil) Ana Victoria Boré	def.	(Brazil) Suellen Santos	Decision (unanimous)	3	3:00	

== K-1 Dontaku 2026 ==
K-1 Dontaku 2026
- Promotion: K-1
- Date: July 20, 2026
- Venue: Marine Messe Fukuoka Hall B
- City: Fukuoka, Japan

K-1 Dontaku 2026 was a kickboxing event held by K-1 on July 20, 2026, in Fukuoka, Japan.

=== Fight Card ===
K-1 Dontaku 2026
Weight Class				Method	Round	Time	Notes
Cruiserweight 90 kg	(Netherlands) Thian de Vries	def.	(Japan) K-Jee	KO (high kick)	1	1:29	
Bantamweight 53 kg	(Japan) Neigo Katono	def.	(Japan) Issei Ishii (c)	TKO (3 knockdowns)	2	2:46	for the K-1 Bantamweight Championship
Heavyweight	(Iran) Mahmoud Sattari	def.	(Japan) Akira Jr	KO (punches)	1	0:26	
Super Welterweight 70 kg	(Armenia) Zhora Akopyan	def.	(Japan) Kazuki Matsumoto	Decision (unanimous)	3	3:00	
Women's Flyweight 52 kg	(Japan) SAHO (c)	def.	(Brazil) Laysa Silva	Decision (unanimous)	3	3:00	for the K-1 Women's Flyweight Championship
Super Lightweight 65 kg	(Japan) Ayumu	def.	(Japan) Kotaro	Decision (unanimous)	3	3:00	
Super Welterweight 70 kg	(Australia) Zack Pankhurst	def.	(Greece) Achilleas Karapiperis	Decision (unanimous)	3	3:00	K-1 World MAX 2026 Qualifier
Super Welterweight 70 kg	(Italy) Lorenzo Di Vara	def.	(Spain) Sergio Sanchez	Decision	3	3:00	K-1 World MAX 2026 Qualifier
Catchweight 66 kg	(Japan) Kohei Hatanaka	def.	(Russia) Viktor Akimov	Decision (unanimous)	3	3:00	
Women's Atomweight 45 kg	(Japan) Aki Suematsu	def.	(Mexico) Veronica Rodriguez (c)	Ext.R Decision (unanimous)	4	3:00	for the K-1 Women's Atomweight Championship
Super Bantamweight 55 kg	(Japan) Kengo Murata	def.	(Japan) Isshi	Decision (majority)	3	3:00	
Super Featherweight 60 kg	(Thailand) Dawsayam Wor.Wanchai	def.	(Japan) Ryuya Nishimoto	Decision (unanimous)	3	3:00	
Bantamweight 53 kg	(Japan) Kakeru Nagano	def.	(Japan) Toranosuke Higashi	Decision (majority)	3	3:00	
Bantamweight 53 kg	(Japan) Ryu Ohira	def.	(Japan) Keito Ishigo	Decision (unanimous)	3	3!00	
Welterweight 67.5 kg	(Japan) KONG Kosei	def.	(Japan) KO-TA Bravely	Decision (majority)	3	3:00	
Featherweight 57.5 kg	(Japan) Akuseru	def.	(Japan) Ginji	KO (body kick)	3	1:53	
Catchweight 51 kg	(Japan) Jinsei Yoshikawa	def.	(Japan) Kohaku	KO (left hook)	1	2:33	
Preliminary Card
Bantamweight 53 kg	(Japan) Kenshin Tanabe	def.	(Japan) Ritoru	TKO (3 knockdowns)	1	1:58	
Super Featherweight 60 kg	(Japan) Musashi	def.	(Japan) Kazumi	KO (knee to th ebody)	1	1:47	

== K-1 World GP -90kg Preliminary in Yekaterinburg ==
K-1 World GP -90kg Preliminary in Yekaterinburg
- Promotion: K-1; RCC Fair Fight
- Date: August 1, 2026
- Venue: Archangel Michael Complex
- City: Yekaterinburg, Russia

K-1 World GP –90 kg Preliminary in Yekaterinburg was a kickboxing event held in co-promotion by K-1 and RCC Fair Fight on August 1, 2026, in Yekaterinburg, Russia.

=== K-1 World GP -90kg Russia Tournament bracket ===
Semi-finals
(Belarus) Nikita Kokosh	UD
(Russia) Valeriy Ivanov	3
(Russia) Valeriy Bizyaev	3
(Russia) Yan Petrovich	UD

Final
(Belarus) Nikita Kokosh	TKO
(Russia) Yan Petrovich	1

=== Fight Card ===
K-1 World GP –90 kg Preliminary in Yekaterinburg
Weight Class				Method	Round	Time	Notes
Catchweight 77 kg	(Russia) Eduard Saik (c)	def.	(Russia) Shakhmir Abakarov	Decision (unanimous)	5	3:00	For the RCC Fair Fight 77 kg title
Cruiserweight 90 kg	(Belarus) Nikita Kokosh	def.	(Russia) Yan Petrovich	TKO (corner stoppage)	1	1:53	K-1 World GP –90 kg Preliminary Russia Tournament, Final
Super Welterweight 70 kg	(Russia) Konstantin Shakhtarin	def.	(Spain) Armando Rosario	KO (Elbow)	2		Muay Thai rules
Catchweight 70.5 kg	(Russia) Khiramagomed Aliev	def.	(Russia) Denis Burmatov	Decision (unanimous)	3	3:00	
Catchweight 70.5 kg	(Russia) Rostislav Varnavsky	def.	(Russia) Eduard Fatykov	Ex.R TKO (doctor stoppage)	4		
Catchweight 61.2 kg	(Russia) Tagir Khalilov	def.	(Iran) Ali Zarinfar	Decision (unanimous)	3	3:00	Muay Thai rules
Catchweight 73 kg	(Russia) Dmitry Dmitriev	def.	(Uganda) Award Kazimba	Decision (unanimous)	3	3:00	
Catchweight 77 kg	(Russia) Ruslan Kiselev	def.	(Russia) Vladimir Gabov	TKO (body shot)	2		
Super Lightweight 65 kg	(Russia) Vitaly Shnyukov	draw	(Russia) Amirkhan Zakriev	Decision	3	3:00	
Cruiserweight 90 kg	(Belarus) Nikita Kokosh	def.	(Russia) Valeriy Ivanov	Decision (unanimous)	3	3:00	K-1 World GP –90 kg Preliminary Tournament, Semifinals
Cruiserweight 90 kg	(Russia) Yan Petrovich	def.	(Russia) Valeriy Bizyaev	Decision (unanimous)	3	3:00	K-1 World GP –90 kg Preliminary Tournament, Semifinals
Cruiserweight 90 kg	(Belarus) Seku Bangura	def.	(Russia) Nikita Kondratov	Ext.R Decision	4	3:00	K-1 World GP –90 kg Preliminary Russia Tournament, reserve
Catchweight 61.2 kg	(Russia) Ivan Buldakov	def.	(Russia) Artur Budagyan	Decision (unanimous)	3	3:00	

== K-1 World MAX 2026 -70kg World Championship Tournament Final 16 ==
K-1 World MAX 2026 -70kg World Championship Tournament Final 16
- Promotion: K-1
- Date: September 12, 2026
- Venue: Yoyogi 2nd Gymnasium
- City: Tokyo, Japan

K-1 World MAX 2026 –70 kg World Championship Tournament Final 16 was a kickboxing event held by K-1 on September 12, 2026, in Yokohama, Japan.

=== Background ===
The event will feature 16 fighters in the 70 kg division competing for a spot on the 8-man tournament at the K-1 World MAX 2026 – 70 kg World Championship Tournament Final Round event in December 2026.

=== Fight Card ===
K-1 World MAX 2026 –70 kg World Championship Tournament Final 16
Weight Class				Method	Round	Time	Notes
Super Welterweight 70 kg	(Brazil) Jonas Salsicha	def.	(Armenia) Zhora Akopyan	Decision (unanimous)	3	3:00	K-1 World MAX 2026 Final 16
Super Welterweight 70 kg	(Italy) Lorenzo Di Vara	def.	(Netherlands) Darryl Verdonk	Decision (unanimous)	3	3:00	K-1 World MAX 2026 Final 16
Super Welterweight 70 kg	(Poland) Kacper Muszyński	def.	(Ukraine) Serhii Adamchuk	Ext.R Decision (split)	4	3:00	K-1 World MAX 2026 Final 16
Super Welterweight 70 kg	(Russia) Vladimir Tulaev	def.	(Bulgaria) Stoyan Koprivlenski	KO (left hook)	2	2:16	K-1 World MAX 2026 Final 16
Super Lightweight 65 kg	(Japan) Taio Asahisa (c)	def.	(Senegal) Alassane Kamara	Decision (unanimous)	3	3:00	For the K-1 Super Lightweight Championship.
Super Featherweight 60 kg	(Japan) Tomoya Yokoyama (c)	def.	(Cambodia) Thun Menghong	KO (left cross)	2	1:25	For the K-1 Super Featherweight Championship
Heavyweight	(Russia) Maxim Baklanov	def.	(Romania) Bogdan Stoica	KO (calf kick)	1	1:45	K-1 Heavyweight Title Eliminator
Women's Flyweight 52 kg	(Japan) Mona Kimura	def.	(Switzerland) Marine Nicol	Ext.R Decision (unanimous)	4	3:00	
Super Welterweight 70 kg	(Netherlands) Jayjay Morris	def.	(Brazil) Vitor Toffanelli	Decision (unanimous)	3	3:00	K-1 World MAX 2026 Final 16
Super Welterweight 70 kg	(Cambodia) Lorn Panha	def.	(Japan) Kazuki Matsumoto	Decision (majority)	3	3:00	K-1 World MAX 2026 Final 16
Super Welterweight 70 kg	(Australia) Zack Pankhurst	def.	(Thailand) Winner PK Saenchai	Decision (majority)	3	3:00	K-1 World MAX 2026 Final 16
Super Welterweight 70 kg	(Brazil) Jones Coliseu	def.	(Senegal) Alfousseynou Kamara	TKO (left hook)	3	1:56	K-1 World MAX 2026 Final 16
Lightweight 62.5 kg	(Japan) Kiyomitsu Samuel Nagasawa	def.	(Japan) Yuzuki Satomi (c)	TKO (referee stoppage)	2	1:41	For the K-1 Lightweight Championship
Super Bantamweight 55 kg	(Japan) Riamu	def.	(Japan) Akihiro Kaneko (c)	Ext.R Decision (split)	4	3:00	For the K-1 Super Bantamweight Championship
Featherweight 57.5 kg	(Japan) Rui Okubo	vs.	(Japan) Ryota Ishida (c)	KO (left hook)	3	1:25	For the K-1 Featherweight Championship
Catchweight 63 kg	(Japan) Yuta Murakoshi	def.	(Japan) Kenta Hayashi	Decision (unanimous)	3	3:00	
Super Bantamweight 55 kg	(Japan) Kenshin Tanabe	def.	(Japan) Koji Ikeda	TKO (punch)	2	2:15	
Welterweight 67.5 kg	(Japan) Takuma Tsukamoto	def.	(Spain) Manuel Menendez	Decision (unanimous)	3	3:00	
Preliminary Card
Featherweight 57.5 kg	(Japan) Taiju Kurata	def.	(Japan) Raigo Miyazaki	Decision (unanimous)	3	3:00	

== K-1 Fighting Network in Korea 2026 ==
K-1 Fighting Network in Korea 2026
- Promotion: K-1; EMA Championship
- Date: September 19, 2026
- Venue: Sangju Indoor Gymnasium
- City: Sangju, South Korea

K-1 Fighting Network in Korea 2026 was a kickboxing event held in co-promotion by K-1 and EMA Championship on September 19, 2026, in Sangju, South Korea.

=== Fight Card ===
K-1 Fighting Network in Korea 2026
Weight Class				Method	Round	Time	Notes
Super Welterweight 70 kg	(South Korea) Kim Hyun Jun	def.	(Japan) Jinku Oda	Decision (unanimous)	3	3:00	
Super Welterweight 70 kg	(Japan) Masaki Oishi	def.	(South Korea) Yang Hong Cheol	KO (right cross)	1	2:59	
Catchweight 63 kg	(Japan) Toki Harada	def.	(South Korea) Lee Hyun Seok	Decision (unanimous)	3	3:00	
Catchweight 54 kg	(South Korea) Kim Min Ji	def.	(Japan) Melty Kira	Decision (unanimous)	3	3:00	
Super Welterweight 70 kg	(South Korea) Kwon Ki Seop	def.	(South Korea) Lee Ha Rim	KO (knee to the body)	1	2:05	
Super Featherweight 60 kg	(South Korea) Choo Hyung Rim	def.	(South Korea) Kang Duk Hoon	TKO (3 knockdowns)	1	2:07	
Catchweight 63.5 kg	(South Korea) Lee Sung Bin	def.	(South Korea) Choi In Sun	Decision (unanimous)	3	3:00	
Catchweight 74 kg	(South Korea) Kim Yubin	def.	(South Korea) Lee Seunghyun	Decision (majority)	3	3:00	open finger gloves
Bantamweight 55 kg	(South Korea) Kim Gang Min	def.	(South Korea) Song Se Min	Decision	3	3:00	

== K-1 World GP -90kg Qualification in Brasília ==
K-1 World GP -90kg Qualification in Brasília
- Promotion: K-1; WGP Kickboxing
- Date: September 26, 2026
- Venue: AABB Brasília
- City: Brasília, Brazil

K-1 World GP –90kg Qualification in Brasília was a kickboxing event held in co-promotion by K-1 and WGP Kickboxing on September 26, 2026, in Brasília, Brazil.

=== K-1 World GP -90kg in Brasília Tournament bracket ===
Quarter-finals
(Brazil) Marco Antonio	KO
(Brazil) Guilherme Schneider	1
(Brazil) João Victor	KO
(Brazil) João Pedro Simão	1
(Brazil) Matheus Nogueira	UD
(Paraguay) Angel Bogado	3
(Brazil) Agnaldo Arruda	KO
(Brazil) Clayton Ferreira	1

Semi-finals
(Brazil) Marco Antonio	3
(Brazil) João Victor	KO
(Brazil) Matheus Nogueira	1
(Brazil) Agnaldo Arruda	TKO

Final
(Brazil) João Victor	SD
(Brazil) Agnaldo Arruda	3

=== Fight Card ===
K-1 World GP –90 kg Qualification in Brasília
Weight Class				Method	Round	Time	Notes
Cruiserweight 90 kg	(Brazil) João Victor	def.	(Brazil) Agnaldo Arruda	Decision (split)	3	3:00	K-1 World GP –90 kg in Brasília Tournament, Final
Catchweight 71.8 kg	(Brazil) André Martins	def.	(Chile) Sebastián Corral	Decision (majority)	3	3:00	
Cruiserweight 90 kg	(Brazil) Agnaldo Arruda	def.	(Brazil) Matheus Nogueira	TKO (2 knockdowns)	1		K-1 World GP –90 kg in Brasília Tournament, Semifinals
Cruiserweight 90 kg	(Brazil) João Victor	def.	(Brazil) Marco Antonio	KO (left hook to the body)	3		K-1 World GP –90 kg in Brasília Tournament, Semifinals
Super Featherweight 60 kg	(Paraguay) Fabrizio Alcaraz	def.	(Brazil) Paulo Sergipe	TKO (3 knockdowns)	1	1:37	
Catchweight 78.1 kg	(Brazil) Iury Souza	def.	(Brazil) Vitor Jannuzzi	Decision (unanimous)	3	3:00	
Cruiserweight 90 kg	(Brazil) Agnaldo Arruda	def.	(Brazil) Clayton Ferreira	KO (punch)	1		K-1 World GP –90 kg in Brasília Tournament, Quarterfinals
Cruiserweight 90 kg	(Brazil) João Victor	def.	(Brazil) João Pedro Simão	TKO (2 knockdowns/punches)	1		K-1 World GP –90 kg in Brasília Tournament, Quarterfinals
Cruiserweight 90 kg	(Brazil) Matheus Nogueira	def.	(Paraguay) Angel Bogado	Decision (unanimous)	3	3:00	K-1 World GP –90 kg in Brasília Tournament, Quarterfinals
Cruiserweight 90 kg	(Brazil) Marco Antonio	def.	(Brazil) Guilherme Schneider	TKO (2 knockdowns/low kicks)	1		K-1 World GP –90 kg in Brasília Tournament, Quarterfinals
Preliminary Card
Catchweight 71.8 kg	(Brazil) Gustavo Sete	def.	(Brazil) Kadu Lima	Decision (majority)	3	3:00	
Catchweight	(Brazil) Augusto Almeida	def.	(Brazil) Fabyo Ribeiro	KO (flying knee)	3	2:59	

== K-1 World GP -90kg Preliminary in Iași ==
K-1 World GP -90kg Preliminary in Iași
- Promotion: K-1; Dynamite Fighting Show
- Date: October 9, 2026
- City: Iași, Romania

K-1 World GP -90kg Preliminary in Iași or Dynamite Fighting Show 32 was a kickboxing event held in co-promotion by K-1 and Dynamite Fighting Show in October 9, 2026, in Iaşi, Romania.

Remy Bonjasky, Benjamin Adegbuyi, Ștefan Lătescu and Andrei Stoica made special guest appearances at the event.

=== K-1 World GP -90kg Romania Tournament bracket ===
Semi-finals
(Romania) Vasile Corcodel	UD
(Romania) Sebastian Lutaniuc	3
(Romania) Becali Bodescu	UD
(Romania) Aaron Măcăilă	3

Final
(Romania) Vasile Corcodel	UD
(Romania) Becali Bodescu	3

=== Fight Card ===
Main Card
Weight Class				Method	Round	Time	Notes
Openweight	(Romania) Florin Lambagiu	vs.	(Romania) Cristian Ristea	Decision (unanimous)	3	3:00	
Super Welterweight 70 kg	(Romania) Albert Enache	def.	(France) Hugo Villeneuve	KO (knee to the head)			For the vacant ISKA K-1 European -70kg title
Cruiserweight 90 kg	(Romania) Vasile Corcodel	def.	(Romania) Becali Bodescu	Decision (unanimous)	3	3:00	K-1 World GP –90 kg in Romania 4-man Tournament, Final
Catchweight	(Romania) Tudor Potoroacă	def.	(Italy) Francesco Carbotti	TKO (3 knockdowns)	1		
Catchweight	(Romania) Andrei Leuştean	def.	(Spain) Hadji Ndow	TKO (3 knockdowns)	2	2:15	
Catchweight	(Romania) Emanuel Lupașcu	def.	(Moldova) Damir Popovici	Decision (unanimous)	3	3:00	
Catchweight	(Romania) Denisa Vulpe	def.	(Moldova) Maria Chișca	TKO (retirement)	3	0:58	
Cruiserweight 90 kg	(Romania) Marius Rotaru	def.	(Romania) Mădălin Mogoş	TKO (punches)	1		K-1 World GP –90 kg in Romania 4-man Tournament, reserve
Cruiserweight 90 kg	(Romania) Becali Bodescu	def.	(Romania) Aaron Măcăilă	Decision (unanimous)	3	3:00	K-1 World GP –90 kg in Romania 4-man Tournament, Semifinals
Cruiserweight 90 kg	(Romania) Vasile Corcodel	def.	(Romania) Sebastian Lutaniuc	Decision (unanimous)	3	3:00	K-1 World GP –90 kg in Romania 4-man Tournament, Semifinals

== K-1 World GP -90kg Qualification in Dortmund ==
K-1 World GP -90kg Qualification in Dortmund
- Promotion: K-1; World Fighting League
- Date: October 24, 2026
- Venue: Helmut-Körnig-Halle
- City: Dortmund, Germany

K-1 World GP –90 kg Qualification in Dortmund was a kickboxing event held in co-promotion by K-1 and WFL on October 24, 2026, in Dortmund, Germany.

=== K-1 World GP -90kg in Dortmund Tournament bracket ===
Quarter-finals
(Greece) Valentinos Kyriakidis
(Germany) Marvin Stepputtis
(Morocco) Fekaki Othmane
(Germany) Robert Stoll
(Poland) Karol Łasiewicki
(Germany) Agon Bellaqa
(Albania) Arbnor Zeqa
(Morocco) Yassir Taoussi

Semi-finals
(Germany) Robert Stoll
(Germany) Marvin Stepputtis
(Germany) Agon Bellaqa
(Morocco) Yassir Taoussi

Final
(Germany) Robert Stoll	UD
(Morocco) Yassir Taoussi	3

=== Fight Card ===
K-1 World GP –90 kg Qualification in Dortmund
Weight Class				Method	Round	Time	Notes
Catchweight 82.5 kg	(Germany) Sergej Braun	def.	(Cameroon) Brice Kombou	Decision (unanimous)	5	3:00	For the ISKA, WFL and WKU K-1 World titles
Cruiserweight 90 kg	(Germany) Robert Stoll	def.	(Morocco) Yassir Taoussi	Decision (unanimous)	3	3:00	K-1 World GP –90 kg Dortmund Tournament, Final
Heavyweight	(Netherlands) Jahfarr Wilnis	def.	(Germany) Andre Schmeling	Decision (unanimous)	5	3:00	For the WFL and WKU K-1 World Heavyweight titles
Cruiserweight 90 kg	(Morocco) Yassir Taoussi	def.	(Germany) Agon Bellaqa				K-1 World GP –90 kg Dortmund Tournament, Semifinals
Cruiserweight 90 kg	(Germany) Robert Stoll	vs.	(Germany) Marvin Stepputtis				K-1 World GP –90 kg Dortmund Tournament, Semifinals
Catchweight 72.5 kg	(Democratic Republic of the Congo) Jonathan Mayezo	def.	(Lebanon) Ibrahim Abdul-Malak	Decision (unanimous)	3	3:00	
Heavyweight	(France) Faress Bainine	def.	(France) Malang Konta	Decision (unanimous)	3	3:00	
Catchweight	(Romania) Vasile Amaritei	def.	(Greece) Michael Karamousketas	Decision (unanimous)	3	3:00	
Catchweight	(Germany) Samira Kindermann	def.	(Netherlands) Kim De Man	Decision	3	3:00	
Cruiserweight 90 kg	(Morocco) Yassir Taoussi	def.	(Albania) Arbnor Zeq				K-1 World GP –90 kg Dortmund Tournament, Quarterfinals
Cruiserweight 90 kg	(Germany) Agon Bellaqa	def.	(Poland) Karol Łasiewicki				K-1 World GP –90 kg Dortmund Tournament, Quarterfinals
Cruiserweight 90 kg	(Germany) Robert Stoll	def.	(Morocco) Fekaki Othmane				K-1 World GP –90 kg Dortmund Tournament, Quarterfinals
Cruiserweight 90 kg	(Germany) Marvin Stepputtis	def.	(Greece) Valentinos Kyriakidis				K-1 World GP –90 kg Dortmund Tournament, Quarterfinals
Preliminary Card
Catchweight 63 kg	(Poland) Pavel Sadouski	def.	(Netherlands) Roan Korver	Decision (unanimous)	3	3:00	

== K-1 World GP -90kg Qualification in Melbourne ==
K-1 World GP -90kg Qualification in Melbourne
- Promotion: K-1; Iron Lion Promotions
- Date: October 31, 2026
- Venue: Pullman Albert Park
- City: Melbourne, Australia

K-1 World GP –90 kg Qualification in Melbourne will be a kickboxing event held by K-1 and Iron Lion Promotions on October 31, 2026, in Melbourne, Australia.

=== K-1 World GP -90kg in Melbourne Tournament bracket ===
Quarter-finals
(Australia) Jesse Astill
(New Zealand) Leki Goetz	TKO
(Australia) Michael Wiktora	3
(Tonga) Lapa Halangahu	UD
(Samoa) Visesio Saina	UD
(New Zealand) Mani Jnr Ngungutau	3
(New Zealand) Jabez Siafa
(Australia) Charlie Bubb	TKO

Semi-finals
(New Zealand) Leki Goetz	TKO
(Tonga) Lapa Halangahu
(Samoa) Visesio Saina
(Australia) Charlie Bubb	TKO

Final
(New Zealand) Leki Goetz	1
(Australia) Charlie Bubb	TKO

=== Fight Card ===
K-1 World GP –90 kg Qualification in Melbourne
Weight Class				Method	Round	Time	Notes
Cruiserweight 90 kg	(Australia) Charlie Bubb	def.	(New Zealand) Leki Goetz	TKO (3 knockdowns)	1		K-1 World GP –90 kg in Melbourne Tournament, Final
Catchweight 69.8 kg	(Australia) Dylan Birdo	def.	(Fiji) Simoni Mario	Decision	6	3:00	Boxing rules
	(Australia) Manos Milios	def.	(Samoa) Colin Tui	KO (left hook)			For the vacant SCC International Super Middleweight title
Cruiserweight 90 kg	(Australia) Charlie Bubb	def.	(Samoa) Visesio Saina	TKO (4 knockdowns)			K-1 World GP –90 kg in Melbourne Tournament, Semifinals
Cruiserweight 90 kg	(New Zealand) Leki Goetz	def.	(Tonga) Lapa Halangahu	TKO (referee stoppage)			K-1 World GP –90 kg in Melbourne Tournament, Semifinals
Super Featherweight 60 kg	(Australia) Melisa Murselovic	def.	(Australia) Sylvana Nassour	Decision (unanimous)	3	3:00	
Cruiserweight 90 kg	(Australia) Charlie Bubb	def.	(New Zealand) Jabez Siafa	TKO (3 knockdowns)			K-1 World GP –90 kg in Melbourne Tournament, Quarterfinals
Cruiserweight 90 kg	(Samoa) Visesio Saina	def.	(New Zealand) Timani Ngungutau	Decision (unanimous)	3	3:00	K-1 World GP –90 kg in Melbourne Tournament, Quarterfinals
Cruiserweight 90 kg	(Tonga) Lapa Halangahu	def.	(Australia) Michael Wiktora	Decision (unanimous)	3	3:00	K-1 World GP –90 kg in Melbourne Tournament, Quarterfinals
Cruiserweight 90 kg	(New Zealand) Leki Goetz	def.	(Australia) Jesse Astill	TKO (3 knockdowns)			K-1 World GP –90 kg in Melbourne Tournament, Quarterfinals
Preliminary Card
Catchweight 82 kg	(Australia) Noah Hamilton	def.	(Australia) James Anderson	Decision (unanimous)	3	3:00	
Catchweight 62 kg	(Australia) Mehdi Alkhamas	vs.	(New Zealand) Daniel Mataio	KO (straight to the body)	1		

== K-1 World GP -90kg Qualification in Milan ==
K-1 World GP -90kg Qualification in Milan
- Promotion: K-1; PetrosyanMania
- Date: November 7, 2026
- City: Milan, Italy

K-1 World GP –90 kg Qualification in Milan will be a kickboxing event held by K-1 and PetrosyanMania on November 7, 2026, in Milan, Italy.

=== K-1 World GP -90kg in Milan Tournament bracket ===
Quarter-finals
(Italy) Samuele Pugliese	UD
(Netherlands) Maikel Frank	3
(Romania) Alexandru Amariței	1
(Romania) Aaron Măcăilă	TKO
(Morocco) Amin Aarafa	2
(Cameroon) Loic Njeya	TKO
(Italy) Cristiano De Toffol	3
(Moldova) Lucian Genunchi	UD

Semi-finals
(Italy) Samuele Pugliese	2
(Romania) Aaron Măcăilă	TKO
(Cameroon) Loic Njeya	SD
(Moldova) Lucian Genunchi	3

Final
(Romania) Aaron Măcăilă	UD
(Cameroon) Loic Njeya	3

=== Fight Card ===
K-1 World GP –90 kg Qualification in Milan
Weight Class				Method	Round	Time	Notes
Super Lightweight 65 kg	(Romania) Ștefan Vrânceanu	def.	(Italy) Eddy Vinotti	TKO (referee stoppage)	5	2:11	For the inaugural PetrosyanMania 65 kg World title
Super Welterweight 70 kg	(Slovenia) Samo Petje	def.	(Ukraine) Stanislav Kazantsev	Decision (unanimous)	5	3:00	For the inaugural PetrosyanMania 70 kg World title
Catchweight 77 kg	(Morocco) Ilyass Chakir	def.	(Italy) Andrea Rigamonti	Decision (unanimous)	5	3:00	For the inaugural PetrosyanMania 77 kg European title
Super Featherweight 60 kg	(Italy) Fabrizio Ruggiero	def.	(Georgia (country)) Aleksandre Mukbaniani	Decision (unanimous)	5	3:00	For the inaugural PetrosyanMania 60 kg European title
Catchweight 55 kg	(Algeria) Houda Boutebdja	def.	(Italy) Ilaria Pizzuti	Decision	5	3:00	For the vacant WAKO-pro Italian Featherweight (–55 kg) title
Super Welterweight 70 kg	(Morocco) Aimane Farjaoui	def.	(Morocco) Haitham El Mazahi	Decision (unanimous)	3	3:00	2026 PetrosyanMania 70 kg 4-Man Tournament, Final
Cruiserweight 90 kg	(Romania) Aaron Măcăilă	def.	(Cameroon) Loic Njeya	Decision (unanimous)	3	3:00	K-1 World GP –90 kg Italy Tournament, Final
Catchweight 80 kg	(Romania) Riccardo Ivașco	def.	(Italy) Andrea Festa	Decision (unanimous)	3	3:00	
Preliminary Card
Super Welterweight 70 kg	(Morocco) Haitham El Mazahi	def.	(Senegal) Mouhamed Niang	Decision (unanimous)	3	3:00	2026 PetrosyanMania 70 kg 4-Man Tournament, Semifinals
Super Welterweight 70 kg	(Morocco) Aimane Farjaoui	def.	(Romania) Laurențiu Partenie	Decision (unanimous)	3	3:00	2026 PetrosyanMania 70 kg 4-Man Tournament, Semifinals
Cruiserweight 90 kg	(Cameroon) Loic Njeya	def.	(Moldova) Lucian Genunchi	Decision (split)	3	3:00	K-1 World GP –90 kg Italy Tournament, Semifinals
Cruiserweight 90 kg	(Romania) Aaron Măcăilă	def.	(Italy) Samuele Pugliese	TKO (low kicks)	2	0:38	K-1 World GP –90 kg Italy Tournament, Semifinals
Super Welterweight 70 kg	(Morocco) Aymen Kamil	def.	(Morocco) Ouassim Touzi	Decision (unanimous)	3	3:00	2026 PetrosyanMania 70 kg 4-Man Tournament, reserve
Cruiserweight 90 kg	(Senegal) Sammy Tevette	def.	(Italy) Ludovico Toia	Decision (unanimous)	3	3:00	K-1 World GP –90 kg Italy Tournament, reserve
Catchweight 74 kg	(Morocco) Mohamed El Aamraoui	def.	(Romania) Mihai Cernescu	Decision (unanimous)	3	3:00	Muay Thai rules
Cruiserweight 90 kg	(Moldova) Lucian Genunchi	def.	(Italy) Cristiano De Toffol	Decision (unanimous)	3	3:00	K-1 World GP –90 kg Italy Tournament, Quarterfinals
Cruiserweight 90 kg	(Cameroon) Loic Njeya	def.	(Morocco) Amin Aarafa	TKO (punches)	2	1:54	K-1 World GP –90 kg Italy Tournament, Quarterfinals
Cruiserweight 90 kg	(Romania) Aaron Măcăilă	def.	(Romania) Alexandru Amariței	TKO (calf kick)	1	0:55	K-1 World GP –90 kg Italy Tournament, Quarterfinals
Cruiserweight 90 kg	(Italy) Samuele Pugliese	def.	(Netherlands) Maikel Frank	Decision (unanimous)	3	3:00	K-1 World GP –90 kg Italy Tournament, Quarterfinals
Catchweight 63 kg	(Italy) Andrea Mengarelli	def.	(Senegal) Fallou Fall	Decision (unanimous)	3	3:00	

== K-1 Revenge II ==
K-1 Revenge II
- Promotion: K-1
- Date: November 23, 2026
- Venue: Korakuen Hall
- City: Tokyo, Japan

K-1 Revenge II is a kickboxing event promoted by K-1 that will be held on November 23, 2026, in Tokyo, Japan.

=== Fight Card ===
K-1 Revenge II
Weight Class				Method	Round	Time	Notes
Super Welterweight 70 kg	(Netherlands) Darryl Verdonk	vs.	(South Korea) Hyun Jun Kim				
Super Lightweight 65 kg	(Senegal) Alassane Kamara	vs.	(Japan) Shu Inagaki				
Ctachweight 76 kg	(Japan) Rei Sugiwaka	vs.	(Japan) Koya Saito				
Intermission
Super Featherweight 60 kg	(Japan) Ryota Ishida	vs.	(Japan) Toma				
Super Featherweight 60 kg	(Japan) Riki	vs.	(Cambodia) Chhut Serey Vannthong				
Super Bantamweight 55 kg	(Japan) Koji Ikeda	vs.	(Japan) Eito Kurokawa				
Super Bantamweight 55 kg	(Japan) Futa Hashimoto	vs.	(Japan) Kaito Kikuchi				
Super Bantamweight 55 kg	(Japan) Chikara Iwao	vs.	(Japan) Kengo Murata				
Super Lightweight 65 kg	(Japan) Yuuki Sakamoto	vs.	(Japan) Daizo Sasaki				

== K-1 Fighting Network in Armenia 2026 ==
K-1 Fighting Network in Armenia 2026
- Promotion: K-1; Mix Fight Event
- Date: November 27, 2026
- Venue: Sports Management Center
- City: Yerevan, Armenia

K-1 Fighting Network in Armenia 2026 or Mix Fight Event 59 will be a kickboxing event held by K-1 and Mix Fight Event on November 27, 2026, in Yerevan, Armenia.

=== K-1 World MAX Armenia 4-man Tournament bracket ===
Semi-finals
(Armenia) Davit Avetisyan

Final

=== Fight Card ===
Main Card
Weight Class				Method	Round	Time	Notes
Super Featherweight 60 kg	(Armenia) Eduard Grigoryan	vs.	(Iran) Moey Ghasemi				
Super Welterweight 70 kg	TBD	vs.	TBD				K-1 World MAX 2027 Qualifier Tournament, Final
Catchweight 69 kg	(Armenia) Seroj Harutyunyan	vs.	(Iran) Saleh Moradnezhad				Boxing rules
Catchweight 70 kg	(Armenia) Gegham Vardanyan	vs.	(Iran) Heydar Shahmonammadinabi				MMA rules
Catchweight 73 kg	(Armenia) Hovik Zakarian	vs.	(Iran) Mohammad Cheraghi				MMA rules
Catchweight 74 kg	(Armenia) Artur Malkhasyan	vs.	(Iran) Saman Shojaie				MMA rules
Catchweight 84 kg	(Armenia) Artur Kspoyan	vs.	(Iran) Amirreza Pouralijan				MMA rules
Super Welterweight 70 kg	(Armenia) Davit Avetisyan	vs.	TBA				K-1 World MAX 2027 Qualifier Tournament, Semifinals
Super Welterweight 70 kg	(Romania) David Boroș	vs.	TBA				K-1 World MAX 2027 Qualifier Tournament, Semifinals
Super Welterweight 70 kg	(Georgia (country)) Giga Khupatsaria	vs.	TBA				K-1 World MAX 2027 Qualifier Tournament, Semifinals
Super Welterweight 70 kg	(Iran) Arsalan Jamalpour	vs.	TBA				K-1 World MAX 2027 Qualifier Tournament, Semifinals
Catchweight 57 kg	(Armenia) Misha Vardanyan	vs.	(Iran) Omidreza Ayar				MMA rules

== K-1 Fighting Network in France 2026 ==
K-1 Fighting Network in France 2026
- Promotion: K-1; Tiger's Fight
- Date: December 5, 2026
- City: Dijon, France

K-1 Fighting Network in France 2026 or Tiger's Fight XI will be a kickboxing event held by K-1 and Tiger's Fight on December 5, 2026, in Dijon, France.

=== K-1 World MAX France 4-man Tournament bracket ===
Semi-finals
(Moldova) Vadim Lungu
(Netherlands) Levi Minkenberg
(France) Guerric Billet
(Thailand) Wutthichai Hansana

Final

=== Fight Card ===
Main Card
Weight Class				Method	Round	Time	Notes
Super Welterweight 70 kg	TBD	vs.	TBD				K-1 World MAX 2027 Qualifier Tournament, Final
Catchweight kg	(France) Valentin Bon Mardion	vs.	(United Kingdom) Joe Welch				For the vacant WAKO Pro K-1 European title
Super Welterweight 70 kg	(Moldova) Vadim Lungu	vs.	(Netherlands) Levi Minkenberg				K-1 World MAX 2027 Qualifier Tournament, Semifinals
Super Welterweight 70 kg	(France) Guerric Billet	vs.	(Thailand) Wutthichai Hansana				K-1 World MAX 2027 Qualifier Tournament, Semifinals
Super Welterweight 70 kg	TBA	vs.	TBA				K-1 World MAX 2027 Qualifier Tournament, reserve
Preliminary Card
kg	TBA	vs.	TBA				

== K-1 World GP -90kg Qualification in Paris ==
K-1 World GP -90kg Qualification in Paris
- Promotion: K-1
- Date: December 5, 2026
- City: Paris, France

K-1 World GP –90 kg Qualification in Paris will be a kickboxing event held on December 5, 2026, in Paris, France.

=== K-1 World GP -90kg in Paris Tournament bracket ===
Quarter-finals

Semi-finals

Final

=== Fight Card ===
K-1 World GP –90 kg Qualification in Paris
Weight Class				Method	Round	Time	Notes
Cruiserweight 90 kg	TBA	vs.					K-1 World GP –90 kg Paris Tournament, Final
Cruiserweight 90 kg	TBA	vs.					K-1 World GP –90 kg Paris Tournament, Semifinals
Cruiserweight 90 kg	TBA	vs.					K-1 World GP –90 kg Paris Tournament, Semifinals
Cruiserweight 90 kg		vs.					K-1 World GP –90 kg Paris Tournament, Quarterfinals
Cruiserweight 90 kg	(France)	vs.					K-1 World GP –90 kg Paris Tournament, Quarterfinals
Cruiserweight 90 kg		vs.					K-1 World GP –90 kg Paris Tournament, Quarterfinals
Cruiserweight 90 kg	(France)	vs.					K-1 World GP –90 kg Paris Tournament, Quarterfinals
Cruiserweight 90 kg	TBA	vs.					K-1 World GP –90 kg Paris Tournament, reserve
Preliminary Card
kg	TBA	vs.	TBA				

== K-1 Fighting Network in Bulgaria 2026 ==
K-1 Fighting Network in Bulgaria 2026
- Promotion: K-1
- Date: December 12, 2026
- Venue: Hall Mladost
- City: Burgas, Bulgaria

K-1 Fighting Network in Bulgaria 2026 will be a kickboxing event held by K-1 on December 12, 2026, in Burgas, Bulgaria.

=== Fight Card ===
Main Card
Weight Class				Method	Round	Time	Notes
Catchweight 77 kg	(Bulgaria) Martin Koprivlenski	vs.	(Italy) Alessio Raciti				
Middleweight 75 kg	(Bulgaria) Anatas Bozhilov	vs.	(Spain) Tanausu Gonzalez				
Middleweight 75 kg	(Bulgaria) Dragomir Petrov	vs.	(Spain) Alejandro Oteo				
Middleweight 75 kg	(Bulgaria) Petar Stoykov	vs.	(Spain) Samuel Solmos				
Super Welterweight 70 kg	(Bulgaria) Ivan Angelov	vs.	(Moldova) Ianos Prohorenco				
Catchweight 80 kg	(Bulgaria) Bozhidar Ivanov	vs.	(Brazil) Diego Gonzaga dos Santos				

== K-1 World GP -90kg Qualification in Abu Dhabi ==
K-1 World GP -90kg Qualification in Abu Dhabi
- Promotion: K-1
- Date: December, 2026
- City: (United Arab Emirates) Abu Dhabi, UAE

K-1 World GP –90 kg Qualification in Abu Dhabi will be a kickboxing event held in December 2026, in Abu Dhabi, UAE.

=== K-1 World GP -90kg in Abu Dhabi Tournament bracket ===
Quarter-finals

Semi-finals

Final

=== Fight Card ===
K-1 World GP –90 kg Qualification in Abu Dhabi
Weight Class				Method	Round	Time	Notes
Cruiserweight 90 kg	TBA	vs.					K-1 World GP –90 kg Abu Dhabi Tournament, Final
Cruiserweight 90 kg	TBA	vs.					K-1 World GP –90 kg Abu Dhabi Tournament, Semifinals
Cruiserweight 90 kg	TBA	vs.					K-1 World GP –90 kg Abu Dhabi Tournament, Semifinals
Cruiserweight 90 kg		vs.					K-1 World GP –90 kg Abu Dhabi Tournament, Quarterfinals
Cruiserweight 90 kg		vs.					K-1 World GP –90 kg Abu Dhabi Tournament, Quarterfinals
Cruiserweight 90 kg		vs.					K-1 World GP –90 kg Abu Dhabi Tournament, Quarterfinals
Cruiserweight 90 kg		vs.					K-1 World GP –90 kg Abu Dhabi Tournament, Quarterfinals
Cruiserweight 90 kg	TBA	vs.					K-1 World GP –90 kg Abu Dhabi Tournament, reserve
Preliminary Card
kg	TBA	vs.	TBA				

== K-1 World MAX 2026 -70kg World Championship Tournament Final ==
K-1 World MAX 2026 -70kg World Championship Tournament Final
- Promotion: K-1
- Date: December 29, 2026
- Venue: Yokohama Buntai
- City: Yokohama, Japan

K-1 World MAX 2026 –70 kg World Championship Tournament Final will be a kickboxing event held by K-1 on December 29, 2026, in Yokohama, Japan.

=== K-1 World MAX 2026 -70kg World Championship Tournament bracket ===
First Round (2025-09-12)
(Netherlands) Darryl Verdonk	3
(Italy) Lorenzo Di Vara	UD
(Ukraine) Serhii Adamchuk	Ex.R
(Poland) Kacper Muszyński	SD
(Australia) Zack Pankhurst	MD
(Thailand) Winner PK Saenchai	3
(Cambodia) Lorn Panha	MD
(Japan) Kazuki Matsumoto	3
(Brazil) Jones Coliseu	KO
(Senegal) Alfousseynou Kamara	3
(Bulgaria) Stoyan Koprivlenski	2
(Russia) Vladimir Tulaev	KO
(Brazil) Jonas Salsicha	UD
(Armenia) Zhora Akopyan	3
(Netherlands) Jayjay Morris	UD
(Brazil) Vitor Toffanelli	3

Quarter Finals
(Italy) Lorenzo Di Vara
(Poland) Kacper Muszyński
(Australia) Zack Pankhurst
(Cambodia) Lorn Panha
(Brazil) Jones Coliseu
(Russia) Vladimir Tulaev
(Brazil) Jonas Salsicha
(Netherlands) Jayjay Morris

Semi Finals

Final

=== Fight Card ===
K-1 World MAX 2026 –70 kg World Championship Tournament Final
Weight Class				Method	Round	Time	Notes
Super Welterweight 70 kg	TBA	vs.					K-1 World MAX 2026 Final Tournament, Final
Lightweight 62.5 kg	(Japan) Kiyomitsu Samuel Nagasawa (c)	vs.	(Japan) Kouzi				For the K-1 Lightweight title
Heavyweight	(Brazil) Ariel Machado (c)	vs.	(Russia) Maxim Baklanov				For the K-1 Heavyweight title
Women's Flyweight 52 kg	(Japan) SAHO (c)	vs.	(Japan) Mona Kimura				For the K-1 Women's Flyweight Championship
Middleweight 75 kg	(Brazil) Dengue Silva (c)	vs.	(Suriname) Jahfaro Gezius				For the K-1 Middleweight Championship
Super Welterweight 70 kg	TBA	vs.					K-1 World MAX 2026 Final Tournament, Semifinals
Super Welterweight 70 kg	TBA	vs.					K-1 World MAX 2026 Final Tournament, Semifinals
Heavyweight	(Italy) Claudio Istrate	vs.	(Japan) Mikio Ueda				
Catchweight 59 kg	(Japan) Rui Okubo	vs.	(Uzbekistan) Bobirjon Isroilov				
Lightweight 62.5 kg	(Japan) Yuzuki Satomi	vs.	(Japan) Hirotaka Asahisa				
Super Bantamweight 55 kg	(Japan) TBD	vs.	TBD				K-1 Super Bantamweight title eliminator
Cruiserweight 90 kg	(Iran) Mahmoud Sattari	vs.	(Romania) Vasile Corcodel				
Bantamweight 53 kg	(Japan) Neigo Katono	vs.	(Japan) Shuto Sato				
Super Welterweight 70 kg	(Brazil) Jonas Salsicha	vs.	(Netherlands) Jayjay Morris				K-1 World MAX 2026 Final Tournament, Quarterfinals
Super Welterweight 70 kg	(Brazil) Jones Coliseu	vs.	(Russia) Vladimir Tulaev				K-1 World MAX 2026 Final Tournament, Quarterfinals
Super Welterweight 70 kg	(Australia) Zack Pankhurst	vs.	(Cambodia) Lorn Panha				K-1 World MAX 2026 Final Tournament, Quarterfinals
Super Welterweight 70 kg	(Italy) Lorenzo Di Vara	vs.	(Poland) Kacper Muszyński				K-1 World MAX 2026 Final Tournament, Quarterfinals
Super Welterweight 70 kg	TBA	vs.					K-1 World MAX 2026 Final Tournament, Reserve
Preliminary Card
Super Bantamweight 55 kg	(Japan) Ryuto Uchida	vs.	(Japan) Sora Amemiya				
Super Bantamweight 55 kg	(Japan) Hiroto	vs.	(Japan) Takumi Shima				

== See also ==
- 2026 in Glory
- 2026 in ONE Championship
- 2026 in RISE
- 2026 in Romanian kickboxing
- 2026 in Wu Lin Feng
