= Lukas Achterberg =

German kickboxer

- Born: May 27, 1996 (age 30); Aachen, Germany
- Other names: Hightower
- Height: 2.00 m (6 ft 6 1/2 in)
- Weight: 93.1 kg (205 lb; 14 st 9 lb)
- Division: Light heavyweight
- Style: Kickboxing
- Fighting out of: Aachen, Germany
- Team: Tough Gym Alsdorf (2015 - 2019); KKS Sparta Aachen eV (2019-)
- Years active: 2018 - present

Kickboxing record
- Total: 20
- Wins: 19
- By knockout: 10
- Losses: 1
- By knockout: 1

Lukas Achterberg (born May 27, 1996) is a German professional kickboxer. K-1 WORLD GP 2026 -90kg World Championship Tournament Champion. As of October 2022, he is ranked as the sixth best light heavyweight kickboxer in the world by Combat Press, having first entered the rankings in October 2022. He was previously ranked as a top ten light heavyweight by Beyond Kickboxing between October 2022 and November 2023.

== Kickboxing career ==
Achterberg faced Rinus Douma for the vacant Big Game -95 kg title at Big Game 2 on March 13, 2018. He captured the vacant title by unanimous decision. Achterberg next faced Baran Er at Fair FC 8 on October 6, 2018. He won the fight by unanimous decision. Achterberg faced Ali Boutaleb at Knock Out 2018 on November 24, 2018. Boutaleb retired from the bout at the end of the first round, after being dropped with an uppercut, which the referee failed to call.

Actherberg faced Feliciano Weiß at Big Game 3 on March 23, 2019. He won the fight by unanimous decision. Achterberg was next booked to face Cedric Lushima, a mixed martial artist, at Ultimate Sparta Championship on April 13, 2019. He won the fight by unanimous decision.

Achterberg faced Kevin Heerschlag at Fair FC 9 on October 5, 2019. He won the fight by second-round knockout, flooring Heerschlag with a head kick which left him unable to rise from the canvas. A month later, on November 23, Achterberg faced Ahmed Shah Ghazikhnani in a non-title bout. He won the bout by unanimous decision.

Achterberg faxed Sandro Zulčić for the vacant Fair FC light heavyweight at Fair FC 10 on October 4, 2020. He won the fight by a second-round knockout.

Achterberg made his Enfusion debut against Peter Verhaegh at Enfusion 103 on October 23, 2021. He won the fight by unanimous decision.

Achterberg faced took part in a 16-man tournament, held at Gladiator Fight Night IV on May 7, 2022. Achterberg won the quarterfinals bout of the tournament against Yankuba Fatajo by a second-round technical knockout, stopping his opponent with a flurry of punches at the very last second of the round. Achterberg faced Rafael Hering in the semifinals and won the fight by unanimous decision. This proved to be his toughest fight of the night, as he was able to cleanly knock out Jolton Peregino with a left hook in the second round of the finals.

Achterberg faced Anthony Leroy in his SENSHI debut at SENSHI 13 on September 10, 2022. He won the fight by a first-round knockout, stopping Leroy with a flying knee.

Achterberg faced Jimmy Livinus at Senshi 19 on November 25, 2023. He lost the fight by a third-round knockout.

On March 29, 2024, Achterberg announced he had successfully undergone cruciate ligament repair surgery.

Achterberg faced the 2022 K-1 World GP Japan Openweight Tournament winner Mahmoud Sattari in the quarterfinals of the 2026 K-1 Cruiserweight World Grand Prix at K-1 World GP 2026 - 90kg World Championship Tournament on February 8, 2026. He needed just 51 seconds to stop his opponent. Achterberg advanced to the semifinals of the one-day tournament, where he faced Bogdan Stoica. He stopped Stoica midway through the opening round. Achterberg faced the Fair Fight Heavyweight champion Nikita Kozlov in the tournament finals. He won the fight by a first-round knockout.

Achterberg was scheduled to challenge Thian De Vries for his K-1 Cruiserweight (-90kg) title at K-1 Dontaku 2026 on July 20, 2026. He withdrew from the fight due to a herniated lumbard disc.

== Championships and accomplishments ==
=== Professional ===
- Fair Fight Championship
  - Fair FC Light Heavyweight (-91 kg) Championship
- Gladiator Fight Night
  - Gladiator Fight Night Light Heavyweight (-93 kg) Tournament title
- K-1
  - K-1 WORLD GP 2026 -90kg World Championship Tournament winner

=== Amateur ===
- International Federation of Muaythai Associations
  - 2017 IFMA European Championships B-class -91 kg (gold)

== Mixed martial arts record ==
Professional record breakdown
1 match	1 win	0 losses
By knockout	1	0

Res.	Record	Opponent	Method	Event	Date	Round	Time	Location	Notes
Win	1–0	Cimey Dos Santos	TKO	USC 5	May 5, 2025	1	1:10	Aachen, Germany	Light heavyweight debut.

== Kickboxing record ==
Professional kickboxing record
19 wins (10 (T)KOs), 1 loss, 0 draws, 0 no contests
Date	Result	Opponent	Event	Location	Method	Round	Time
2027-02-11		TBA	K-1 World GP 2027 -90kg Tournament Final 16, Quarterfinals	Tokyo, Japan			
2026-04-11	Win	(Switzerland) Fabian Lorito	K-1 Genki 2026	Tokyo, Japan	KO (left hook)	1	2:01
2026-02-08	Win	(Russia) Nikita Kozlov	K-1 World GP 2026 - 90kg World Championship Tournament, Final	Tokyo, Japan	KO (low kick)	1	2:19
Wins the 2026 K-1 -90kg World Tournament title.
2026-02-08	Win	(Romania) Bogdan Stoica	K-1 World GP 2026 - 90kg World Championship Tournament, Semifinals	Tokyo, Japan	TKO (2 knockdowns)	1	1:46
2026-02-08	Win	(Iran) Mahmoud Sattari	K-1 World GP 2026 - 90kg World Championship Tournament, Quarterfinals	Tokyo, Japan	KO (left hook)	1	0:51
2023-11-25	Loss	(Netherlands) Jimmy Livinus	Senshi 19	Varna, Bulgaria	KO (knees)	3	2:10
2023-05-13	Win	(Canada) Olivier Langlois-Ross	Senshi 16	Varna, Bulgaria	Decision (majority)	3	3:00
2023-03-11	Win	(Netherlands) Perry Reichling	Golden Event 3	Würselen, Germany	Decision	3	3:00
2022-09-10	Win	(France) Anthony Leroy	Senshi 13	Wuppertal, Germany	KO (flying knee)	1	1:38
2022-05-07	Win	(Brazil) Joilton Lutterbach	Gladiator Fight Night IV, Tournament Finals	Ingolstadt, Germany	KO (left hook)	2	1:53
Wins the Gladiator Fight Night Light Heavyweight (-93 kg) Tournament title.
2022-05-07	Win	(The Gambia) Yankuba Fatajo	Gladiator Fight Night IV, Tournament Semifinals	Ingolstadt, Germany	TKO (referee stoppage)	2	2:59
2022-05-07	Win	(Germany) Lukas Hering	Gladiator Fight Night IV, Tournament Quarterfinals	Ingolstadt, Germany	Decision (unanimous)	3	3:00
2021-10-23	Win	(Netherlands) Peter Verhaegh	Enfusion 103	Wuppertal, Germany	Decision (unanimous)	3	3:00
2020-10-04	Win	(Bosnia and Herzegovina) Sandro Zulčić	Fair FC 10	Bochum, Germany	TKO (punches)	2	0:32
Wins the vacant Fair FC Light Heavyweight (-91 kg) title.
2019-11-23	Win	(Germany) Ahmed Shah Ghazikhnani	Knockout 2019	Vaals, Belgium	Decision (unanimous)	3	3:00
2019-10-05	Win	(Germany) Kevin Heerschlag	Fair FC 9	Bochum, Germany	TKO (referee stoppage)	2	0:30
2019-04-13	Win	(Democratic Republic of the Congo) Cedric Lushima	Ultimate Sparta Championship	Würselen, Germany	Decision (unanimous)	3	3:00
2019-03-23	Win	(Germany) Feliciano Weiß	Big Game 3	Bochum, Germany	Decision (unanimous)	3	3:00
2018-11-24	Win	(Netherlands) Ali Boutaleb	Knock Out 2018	Vaals, Belgium	TKO (retirement)	1	3:00
2018-10-06	Win	(Turkey) Baran Er	Fair FC 8	Bochum, Germany	Decision (unanimous)	3	3:00
2018-03-12	Win	(Netherlands) Rinus Douma	Big Game 2	Bochum, Germany	Decision (unanimous)	5	3:00
Wins the vacant Big Game -95 kg title.
Legend: Win Loss Draw/no contest Notes

Amateur Muay Thai record
Date	Result	Opponent	Event	Location	Method	Round	Time
2017-10-20	Win	(Turkey) Mehmet Ali Ugurlu	2017 IFMA European Championships, Final	Paris, France	RSC.O	1	
Won the 2017 IFMA European Championship B-class -91 kg Gold Medal.
Legend: Win Loss Draw/no contest Notes

== See also ==
- List of male kickboxers
