= James Honey =

Australian Muay Thai kickboxer (born 1996)

- Born: 15 November 1995 (age 30); Shepparton, Australia
- Nationality: Australia
- Height: 1.78 m (5 ft 10 in)
- Weight: 72.5 kg (160 lb; 11.42 st)
- Division: Middleweight
- Style: Muay Thai
- Stance: Orthodox
- Fighting out of: Gold Coast, Australia
- Team: Strikeforce Thai Boxing Gym
- Years active: 2016–present

Kickboxing record
- Total: 47
- Wins: 35
- By knockout: 10
- Losses: 11
- Draws: 0
- No contests: 1
- Last updated on: 2 January 2025

James Honey (born 15 November 1995) is an Australian Muay Thai kickboxer, currently fighting out of Brisbane, Australia. James is the current WMO Muay Thai World Champion and the current ISKA K1 World Champion

== Career ==
=== Recognition ===
In 2024 James fought against former Glory Champion Harut Grigorian and won by split decision.

=== WMO International Title ===
In June 2024 James went on to challenge for the WMO International Middleweight Title at 160 pounds, winning by KO in the first round against Silathong Numponthep

After winning the WMO International title, James got ranked #5 Middleweight 160 pounds Muay Thai Fighter by combat press in July a month after the win. and got ranked #3 WMO World Rankings in the Middleweight 160 pound division, and in WBC Muay Thai World Rankings: Honey holds the #5 position in the Middleweight category.

=== Fight Against Lumpinee Champion Kong Thailand ===
In December 2024 he fought Lumpinee Stadium champion Kong Thailand, would lose a close and competitive split decision.

=== Lumpinee Stadium ===
James Honey faced Bangron Lukporphayasua in February 22, 2025 at the Lumpinee Stadium and won by a first round knockout

=== ISKA World Title ===
After a no contest in October 2024, James rematched Deej Edwards for the ISKA super middleweight k-1 rules world title, won by unanimous decision.

=== WMO World Title ===
In August 16, 2025 James took on Josh Hill for the World Muay Thai Organization (WMO) middleweight world title, won by unanimous decision. Honey’s mother, Michelle, had died the previous month after a battle with cancer. Honey honored her memory by wearing trunks inscribed with “In loving memory of Michelle Honey” during the match.

In 2026, Honey defended the WMO world title against Joe Craven and won by a second round finish.

== Karate Combat ==
On December 5, 2025, Honey made his Karate Combat debut at KC 58 against Oussama Assli in a fight for the Karate Combat Welterweight World Championship. Honey lost the bout by unanimous decision after five rounds, with all judges favoring Assli.

== Titles ==
- WMO Middleweight World Title.
- ISKA Middleweight K-1 Rules World Title.
- WMO International Middleweight Title.

== Muay Thai Kickboxing record ==
Kickboxing record
35 Wins (10 (T)KOs), 11 Losses, 0 Draws, 1 No Contest
Date	Result	Opponent	Event	Location	Method	Round	Time
2026-04-17	Win	Joe Craven	Aus Muay Thai	Australia	KO	2	
Defends The WMO Middleweight World Title.
2025-08-16	Win	Josh Hill	Powerhouse Fight Serie	Australia	Decision	5	3:00
Wins The WMO Middleweight World Title.
2025-04-12	Win	Deej Edwards	Honor Premier League	Australia	Decision	5	3:00
Wins The ISKA Middleweight K-1 Rules World Title.
2025-02-22	Win	Bangron Lukporphayasua	Lumpinee Stadium	Thailand	TKO (left hook)	1	
2024-12-07	Loss	(Thailand) Kongthailand Kiatnavy	Alliance Fight Promotion	Brisbane, Australia	Decision (Split)	3	3:00
2024-10-13	NC	Deej Edwards	F18		No Contest		
For The Vacant ISKA Super Middleweight 172 Pound Kickboxing World Title.
2024-06-29	Win	Silathong Numponthep	War On The Shore	Australia	KO (elbow)	1	0:49
Wins The WMO International Middleweight Title 160 Pounds.
2024-05-03	Loss	David Pennimpede	Eruption Muay Thai 24	Brisbane, Australia	Decision (Split)	3	3:00
2024-02-16	Win	(Belgium) Harut Grigorian	Australia vs. The World	Dubai, UAE	Decision (Split)	3	3:00
2023-08-19	Win	David Pennimpede	Rise Championship 4 Finale	Australia	Decision (Extra Round)	4	3:00
Wins The Rise Middleweight Tournament alongside a prize of 10 thousand dollars.
2023-08-19	Win	Cody Jameson	Rise Championship 4 Semi Final	Australia	Decision (Unanimous)	3	3:00
2023	Loss	Jay Tonkin	Eruption Muay Thai 22	Brisbane, Australia	Decision (Unanimous)	5	3:00
For The Eruption Middleweight Title 160 Pounds.
2022-08-22	Win	Cedar	Eruption Muay Thai 21		KO	1	1:29
2022-08-27	Win	Brown Pinas	WOTS22		Decision	5	3:00
2022-05-28	Win	Sueprball Fairfax	Fairtex Fight 14		Decision (Unanimous)	3	3:00
2021-12-04	Win	Lukas Sayer	MTGP Australia	Australia	Decision	3	3:00
2021	Loss	Jay Tonkin	Eruption Muay Thai 20	Brisbane, Australia	Decision (Unanimous)	3	3:00
2020-12-20	Win	Nick Trask	Eruption Muay Thai	Brisbane, Australia	Decision (Unanimous)	5	3:00
2020-10-10	Win	Jayden Eynaud	Eruption Muay Thai 18	Brisbane, Australia	Decision (Unanimous)	5	3:00
2019-09-14	Loss	(Australia) Charlie Bubb	Eruption Muay Thai	Brisbane, Australia	Decision	5	3:00
2019	Loss	Matt Webb	Eruption Muay Thai	Brisbane, Australia	Decision	3	3:00
2019-06-22	Win	(Australia) Jake Lund	Eruption Muay Thai 16	Brisbane, Australia	Decision (Unanimous)	5	3:00
2019	Win	Brad Davies	Eruption Muay Thai	Brisbane, Australia	Decision (Unanimous)	5	3:00
2018-05-12	Win	Chris Watt	Eruption Muay Thai 14	Brisbane, Australia	Decision (Unanimous)	5	3:00
2017-12-09	Win	Ben Mahoney	Eruption Muay Thai 13	Brisbane, Australia	Decision (Unanimous)	5	3:00
2017-04-22	Win	Sam Ballantyne	Eruption Muay Thai 11	Brisbane, Australia	Decision (Unanimous)	5	3:00
2016-11-05	Win	Jacob Gelston	Road to Rebellion 4	Australia	TKO	3	2:00
Legend: Win Loss Draw/No contest Notes

== Karate Combat record ==
Professional record breakdown
1 match	0 wins	1 loss
By decision	0	1

Res.	Record	Opponent	Method	Event	Date	Round	Time	Location	Notes
Loss	0-1	Oussama Assli	Decision (unanimous)	Karate Combat 58	5 December 2025	5	5:00	Doral, Florida, United States	For the Karate Combat Welterweight championship.
