= Saho Yoshino =

Japanese kickboxer

SAHO
- Born: Saho Yoshino; 15 October 1999 (age 27); Kasai, Hyōgo, Japan
- Height: 1.59 m (5 ft 2 1/2 in)
- Weight: 52 kg (115 lb; 8 st 3 lb)
- Style: Kickboxing, Muay Thai
- Stance: Orthodox
- Fighting out of: Ichikawa, Chiba, Japan
- Team: Toushinjuku Kickboxing Gym

Kickboxing record
- Total: 24
- Wins: 22
- By knockout: 1
- Losses: 2
- By knockout: 0

Saho Yoshino (Japanese: 吉野紗帆, Yoshino Saho; born October 15, 1999), better known by her ring name ☆SAHO☆, is a Japanese kickboxer. She is the current K-1 Women's Flyweight champion. In September 2026, she was ranked best women's pound-for-pound kickboxer in the world by Beyond Kickboxing.

== Kickboxing career ==
=== Early career ===
SAHO faced YAYA for the vacant S1 Ladies Bantamweight Championship at NJKF 2020 4th on November 15, 2020. She won the fight by unanimous decision, with two scorecards of 50–47 and one scorecard of 49–47 in her favor.

SAHO was expected to defend her S1 Ladies World Bantamweight Championship against TheStar Sitcho at NJKF 2021 2nd on June 27, 2021. The fight was later cancelled, as her opponent was unable to gain a visa to enter Japan due to the ongoing COVID-19 pandemic. She instead faced Takuma Ota in an exhibition bout, which ended in a pre-determined no-contest.

=== K-1 ===
SAHO faced Mahiro at K-1 World GP 2021 in Osaka on December 4, 2021. She won the fight by unanimous decision, with all three ringside officials awarding her a 30–27 scorecard.

SAHO faced Jacinta Austin at K-1: Ring of Venus on June 24, 2022. She lost the fight by unanimous decision, with scores of 30–28, 30–28 and 29–28.

SAHO challenged Looknam Kor. Khomkleaw for the vacant S1 World Bantamweight Championship at NJKF 2022 4th on November 13, 2022. She won the fight by unanimous decision, with scores of 49–48, 49–47 and 50–46.

SAHO faced Do Kyung Lee at Krush: Ring of Venus on April 8, 2023. She won the fight by unanimous decision, with two scorecards of 30–28 and one scorecard of 30–27 in her favor.

SAHO faced Mariya Suzuki at K-1 World GP 2023 at Ryogoku on July 16, 2023. She won the fight by unanimous decision, with scores of 30–29, 30–28 and 30–28.

SAHO faced Li Lishan at K-1 ReBIRTH 2 on December 9, 2023. She won the fight by unanimous decision, with two scorecards of 30–28 and one scorecard of 30–27 in her favor.

SAHO challenged Antonia Prifti for the K-1 Women's Flyweight Championship at K-1 World MAX 2024 - World Tournament Opening Round on March 20, 2024. She won the fight by unanimous decision, with scores of 30–29, 30–28 and 30–27.

SAHO faced the undefeated Erivan Barut at K-1 World GP 2024 in Osaka on October 5, 2024. She won the fight by unanimous decision, with two scorecards of 30–27 and one scorecard of 30–26 in her favor.

SAHO faced Dangkongfah Kiatpetnoigym at NJKF Challenger 7 on February 2, 2025. She won the fight by unanimous decision.

SAHO made her first K-1 Women's Flyweight Championship defense against Lara Fernandez at K-1 Dontaku on July 13, 2025. She won the fight by unanimous decision.

SAHO was scheduled to make her second defense against Sofia Tsolakidou for the K-1 Women's Flyweight Championship at K-1 World MAX 2025 - 70kg World Championship Tournament Final on November 15, 2025. It was announced that the bout was cancelled because Tolakidou withdrew due to a lumbar disc herniation on October 24, 2025. They rescheduled the fight for K-1 World GP 2026 - 90kg World Tournament on February 8, 2026. She won the fight by unanimous decision.

== Championships and accomplishments ==
=== Professional ===
- K-1
  - 2024 K-1 Women's Flyweight Championship
    - Three successful title defenses
- Onesongchai
  - 2020 S1 Ladies Japan Bantamweight Championship
  - 2022 S1 Ladies World Bantamweight Championship
- World Muaythai Council
  - 2019 WMC Japan Women's Super Bantamweight Championship
- New Japan Kickboxing Federation
  - 2017 NJFK Minerva Super Bantamweight Championship
    - Two successful title defenses

=== Amateur ===
- World Association of Kickboxing Organizations
  - 2025 W.A.K.O World Championships K-1 -56 kg (bronze)

== Fight record ==
Professional kickboxing record
22 Wins (1 (T)KOs), 2 Losses, 0 Draws
| Date | Result | Opponent | Event | Location | Method | Round | Time |
| 2026-12-29 | | (Japan) Mona Kimura | K-1 World MAX 2026 - World Championship Tournament Final | Yokohama, Japan | | | |
Defending the K-1 Women's Flyweight Championship.
| 2026-07-20 | Win | (Brazil) Laysa Silva | K-1 Dontaku 2026 | Fukuoka, Japan | Decision (unanimous) | 3 | 3:00 |
Defends the K-1 Women's Flyweight Championship.
| 2026-02-08 | Win | (Greece) Sofia Tsolakidou | K-1 World GP 2026 - 90kg World Tournament | Tokyo, Japan | Decision (Unanimous) | 3 | 3:00 |
Defends the K-1 Women's Flyweight Championship.
| 2025-07-13 | Win | (Spain) Lara Fernandez | K-1 Dontaku | Fukuoka, Japan | Decision (Unanimous) | 3 | 3:00 |
Defends the K-1 Women's Flyweight Championship.
| 2025-02-02 | Win | (Thailand) Dangkongfah Kiatpetnoigym | NJKF Challenger 7 | Tokyo, Japan | Decision (Unanimous) | 3 | 3:00 |
| 2024-10-05 | Win | (Turkey) Erivan Barut | K-1 World GP 2024 in Osaka | Osaka, Japan | Decision (Unanimous) | 3 | 3:00 |
| 2024-03-20 | Win | (Greece) Antonia Prifti | K-1 World MAX 2024 - World Tournament Opening Round | Tokyo, Japan | Decision (Unanimous) | 3 | 3:00 |
Wins the K-1 Women's Flyweight Championship.
| 2023-12-09 | Win | (China) Li Lishan | K-1 ReBIRTH 2 | Osaka, Japan | Decision (Unanimous) | 3 | 3:00 |
| 2023-07-16 | Win | (Japan) Mariya Suzuki | K-1 World GP 2023 at Ryogoku | Tokyo, Japan | Decision (Unanimous) | 3 | 3:00 |
| 2023-04-08 | Win | (South Korea) Do Kyung Lee | Krush: Ring of Venus | Tokyo, Japan | Decision (Unanimous) | 3 | 3:00 |
| 2022-11-13 | Win | (Thailand) Looknam Kor. Khomkleaw | NJKF 2022 4th | Tokyo, Japan | Decision (Unanimous) | 5 | 2:00 |
Wins the vacant S1 Ladies World Bantamweight Championship.
| 2022-06-24 | Loss | (Australia) Jacinta Austin | K-1: Ring of Venus | Tokyo, Japan | Decision (Unanimous) | 3 | 3:00 |
| 2021-12-04 | Win | (Japan) Mahiro | K-1 World GP 2021 in Osaka | Osaka, Japan | Decision (Unanimous) | 5 | 2:00 |
| 2020-11-15 | Win | (Japan) YAYA | NJKF 2020 4th, Tournament Finals | Tokyo, Japan | Decision (Unanimous) | 3 | 2:00 |
Wins the vacant S1 Ladies Japan Bantamweight Championship.
| 2020-09-12 | Win | (Japan) Mei Umeo | NJKF 2020 3rd, Tournament Semifinals | Tokyo, Japan | Decision (Majority) | 3 | 2:00 |
| 2019-11-30 | Win | (Japan) Haruka Asai | NJKF 2019 4th | Tokyo, Japan | Decision (Unanimous) | 3 | 3:00 |
Defends the NJFK Minerva Super Bantamweight Championship.
| 2019-05-19 | Win | (Japan) Miiri Sasaki | Muaylok 2019 Hachioji | Hachioji, Japan | Decision (Unanimous) | 5 | 2:00 |
Wins the WMC Japan Women's Super Bantamweight Championship.
| 2018-11-25 | Win | (Japan) Miyumi | NJKF Kizuna XI | Kasukabe, Japan | TKO | 1 | |
Defends the NJFK Minerva Super Bantamweight Championship.
| 2018-04-15 | Win | (Japan) Haruka Yamaguchi | NJKF 2018 West 2nd | Kurashiki, Japan | Decision (Unanimous) | 3 | 2:00 |
| 2017-09-01 | Win | (Japan) Yoshiko Sugiki | NJKF 2017 3rd | Tokyo, Japan | Decision (Unanimous) | 3 | 3:00 |
Wins the NJFK Minerva Super Bantamweight Championship.
| 2017-05-21 | Win | (Japan) Masaki Sato | NJKF Kizuna VIII | Kasukabe, Japan | Decision | 3 | 2:00 |
| 2017-04-23 | Win | (Japan) Kazumi Morita | J-FIGHT&J-GIRLS 2017 ~J-NETWORK 20th Anniversary~2nd | Tokyo, Japan | Decision (Unanimous) | 2 | 2:00 |
| 2017-02-12 | Win | (Japan) Haruka Asai | NJKF DUEL.8 | Tokyo, Japan | Decision (Unanimous) | 3 | 2:00 |
| 2016-10-23 | Loss | (Japan) NANA☆SE | KING OF STRIKERS ROUND 22 | Fukuoka, Japan | Decision (Unanimous) | 3 | 2:00 |
| 2016-07-17 | Win | (Japan) Rika Nakagawa | DEEP☆KICK 30 | Osaka, Japan | Decision (Unanimous) | 3 | 2:00 |
Legend: Win Loss Draw/No contest Notes

Amateur kickboxing record
| Date | Result | Opponent | Event | Location | Method | Round | Time |
|---|---|---|---|---|---|---|---|
| 2025-11-27 | Loss | (Belarus) Polina Galinova | 2025 WAKO World Championship, Semifinals | Abu Dhabi, UAE | Decision (3:0) | 3 | 2:00 |
Wins the 2025 WAKO World Championship K-1 -56kg Bronze Medal.
| 2025-11-26 | Win | (Greece) Konstantina Aroniada | 2025 WAKO World Championship, Quarterfinals | Abu Dhabi, UAE | Decision (3:0) | 3 | 2:00 |
| 2025-11-25 | Win | (Austria) Anna Rubner | 2025 WAKO World Championship, Second Round | Abu Dhabi, UAE | Decision (3:0) | 3 | 2:00 |
| 2025-11-24 | Win | (Spain) Nora Perez | 2025 WAKO World Championship, First Round | Abu Dhabi, UAE | Decision (3:0) | 3 | 2:00 |
Legend: Win Loss Draw/No contest Notes

== See also ==
- List of female kickboxers
