= Nikita Kozlov (kickboxer) =

Russian kickboxer

- Born: November 29, 1992 (age 33); Kamensk-Uralsky, Sverdlovsk Oblast, Russia
- Native name: Никита Козлов
- Height: 1.96 m (6 ft 5 in)
- Weight: 90 kg (200 lb; 14 st)
- Style: Kickboxing
- Stance: Orthodox
- Fighting out of: Yekaterinburg, Russia
- Team: Archangel Michael
- Trainer: Anton Glazyrin; Dmitry Khabibulin
- Years active: 2019 - present

Kickboxing record
- Total: 26
- Wins: 22
- By knockout: 7
- Losses: 4
- By knockout: 1

Nikita Kozlov (born November 29, 1992) is a Russian kickboxer, currently competing in the light heavyweight division of RCC Fair Fight. K-1 WORLD GP 2026 -90kg World Championship Tournament Runner-up. As of October 2022, he is ranked as the seventh best light heavyweight kickboxer in the world by Beyond Kickboxing, and fifth best by Combat Press.

== Kickboxing career ==
Kozlov faced Dominik Sívek at Road to ONE: Night of Warriors 17 on April 24, 2021. He won the fight by unanimous decision.

Kozlov faced Adel Zaripov at Fair Fight 15 on August 28, 2021, in his first fight at light heavyweight. He made a successful debut in a new weight class, as he knocked Zaripov out with a knee at the 2:07 minute mark of the opening round.

Kozlov faced Mitar Dugalić at RCC: Intro 17 on October 23, 2021. He won the fight by a third-round technical knockout, stopping Dugalić with a flurry of punches with just six seconds left in the bout. Kozlov next faced Alexey Dmitriev at RCC: Intro 18 on November 20, 2021. He won the fight by unanimous decision.

Kozlov faced Olivier Langlois-Ross at Fair Fight 16 on February 12, 2022, in his first fight of the year. He won the fight by unanimous decision. Kozlov was then booked to face Sekou Bangura at Fair Fight 17 on June 14, 2022. He won the fight by unanimous decision. Kozlov was booked to face the 2017 Glory Light Heavyweight Contender Tournament Winner Ariel Machado at Fair Fight 18 on July 15, 2022. He won the fight by unanimous decision. Kozlov faced Zinedine Hameur-Lain in his fourth fight of the year at RCC Fair Fight 19 on November 26, 2022. He won the fight by a second-round flying knee knockout.

Kozlov faced Fabio Alberto at RCC Fair Fight 20 on February 18, 2023. He won the fight by a second-round knockout. Kozlov next faced the WGP Kickboxing super middleweight champion Gustavo Jones at RCC 15 on May 13, 2023.

Kozlov faced Matheus Nogueira at RCC Fair Fight 26 on February 3, 2024. He won the fight by unanimous decision.

Kozlov faced Aslan Koshiyev in the quarterfinals of the 2026 K-1 Cruiserweight World Grand Prix at K-1 World GP 2026 - 90kg World Championship Tournament on February 8, 2026. He won the fight by unanimous decision, after an extra fourth round was contested. Kozlov overcame Ibrahim El Bouni in the tournament semifinals and faced Lukas Achterberg for the Grand Prix title in the finals of the one-day tournament. He lost the fight by a first-round knockout.

== Championships and accomplishments ==
=== Professional ===
- RCC Fair Fight
  - 2025 Fair Fight Heavyweight Champion
- K-1
  - K-1 WORLD GP 2026 -90kg World Championship Tournament Runner-up

=== Amateur ===
- World Association of Kickboxing Organizations
  - 2019 WAKO World Grand Prix K-1 -86 kg (bronze)

== Fight record ==
Kickboxing record
22 Wins (7 (T)KO's), 4 Losses, 0 Draws, 0 No Contests
| Date | Result | Opponent | Event | Location | Method | Round | Time |
| 2027-02-11 | | TBA | K-1 World GP 2027 -90kg Tournament Final 16, Quarterfinals | Tokyo, Japan | | | |
| 2026-11-22 | | (Russia) Yan Petrovich | RCC Muay Thai 2 | Yekaterinburg, Russia | | | |
| 2026-02-08 | Loss | (Germany) Lukas Achterberg | K-1 World GP 2026 - 90kg World Championship Tournament, Final | Tokyo, Japan | KO (Low kick) | 1 | 2:19 |
For the 2026 K-1 -90kg World Tournament title.
| 2026-02-08 | Win | (Morocco) Ibrahim El Bouni | K-1 World GP 2026 - 90kg World Championship Tournament, Semifinals | Tokyo, Japan | Decision (Unanimous) | 3 | 3:00 |
| 2026-02-08 | Win | (Kazakhstan) Aslan Koshiyev | K-1 World GP 2026 - 90kg World Championship Tournament, Quarterfinals | Tokyo, Japan | Ext.R Decision (Unanimous) | 4 | 3:00 |
| 2025-08-16 | Win | (Russia) Nikita Varyaga | RCC Fair Fight 32 | Yekaterinburg, Russia | TKO (Punches) | 3 | |
Wins the vacant RCC Fair Fight Heavyweight title.
| 2025-02-08 | Loss | (Russia) Dmitry Vasenev | RCC Fair Fight 29 | Yekaterinburg, Russia | Decision (Unanimous) | 5 | 3:00 |
For the RCC Fair Fight Heavyweight title.
| 2024-12-07 | Win | (Morocco) Othmane Fekaki | RCC Fair Fight 28 | Yekaterinburg, Russia | TKO (3 Knockdowns) | 2 | |
| 2024-04-13 | Win | (Russia) Alexey Golub | RCC Fair Fight - Xtreme World Grand Prix, Quarterfinals | Yekaterinburg, Russia | Decision (Unanimous) | 3 | 3:00 |
| 2024-02-03 | Win | (Brazil) Matheus Nogueira | RCC Fair Fight 26 | Yekaterinburg, Russia | Decision (Unanimous) | 3 | 3:00 |
| 2023-10-28 | Loss | (Netherlands) Thian De Vries | RCC Fair Fight XXIII | Yekaterinburg, Russia | Decision (Unanimous) | 3 | 3:00 |
| 2023-05-13 | Win | (Brazil) Gustavo Jones | RCC 15 | Yekaterinburg, Russia | KO (Spinning backfist) | 3 | 2:49 |
| 2023-02-18 | Win | (Brazil) Fabio Alberto | RCC Fair Fight 20 | Yekaterinburg, Russia | KO (Right hook) | 2 | 1:11 |
| 2022-11-26 | Win | (France) Zinedine Hameur-Lain | RCC Fair Fight 19 | Yekaterinburg, Russia | KO (Flying knee) | 2 | 1:36 |
| 2022-07-15 | Win | (Brazil) Ariel Machado | RCC Fair Fight 18 | Yekaterinburg, Russia | Decision (Unanimous) | 3 | 3:00 |
| 2022-06-14 | Win | (Belarus) Sekou Bangoura | Fair Fight 17 | Yekaterinburg, Russia | Decision (Unanimous) | 3 | 3:00 |
| 2022-02-12 | Win | (Canada) Olivier Langlois-Ross | Fair Fight 16 | Yekaterinburg, Russia | Decision (Unanimous) | 3 | 3:00 |
| 2021-11-20 | Win | (Russia) Alexey Dmitriev | RCC: Intro 18 | Yekaterinburg, Russia | Decision (Unanimous) | 3 | 3:00 |
| 2021-10-23 | Win | (Serbia) Mitar Dugalić | RCC: Intro 17 | Yekaterinburg, Russia | TKO (Punches) | 3 | 2:54 |
| 2021-08-28 | Win | (Russia) Adel Zaripov | Fair Fight 15 | Yekaterinburg, Russia | KO (Knee) | 1 | 2:07 |
| 2021-04-24 | Win | (Czech Republic) Dominik Sívek | Road to ONE: Night of Warriors 17 | Prague, Czech Republic | Decision (Unanimous) | 3 | 3:00 |
| 2021-03-06 | Win | (Russia) Evgeny Nikitin | Fair Fight 14 | Yekaterinburg, Russia | Decision (Unanimous) | 3 | 3:00 |
| 2020-11-28 | Win | (Russia) Nikita Radyakin | Road to ONE 4: Fair Fight 13 | Yekaterinburg, Russia | Decision (Unanimous) | 3 | 3:00 |
| 2020-08-29 | Win | (Russia) Andrey Lobanov | Fair Fight 12 | Yekaterinburg, Russia | Decision (Unanimous) | 3 | 3:00 |
| 2020-01-26 | Win | (Russia) Igor Vorobyov | Fair Fight Lite | Yekaterinburg, Russia | Decision (Unanimous) | 3 | 3:00 |
| 2019-07-08 | Loss | (Romania) Constantin Maleș | Fair Fight 9 | Yekaterinburg, Russia | Decision (Unanimous) | 3 | 3:00 |
| 2019-02-02 | Win | (Russia) Grigory Maltsev | Fair Fight 7 | Yekaterinburg, Russia | Decision (Unanimous) | 3 | 3:00 |
Legend: Win Loss Draw/No contest Notes

Amateur Kickboxing record
20 Wins, 4 Losses
| Date | Result | Opponent | Event | Location | Method | Round | Time |
| 2019-09-27 | Loss | (Belarus) Mikita Shostak | WAKO K-1 World Grand Prix 2019, Semi Final | Prague, Czech Republic | Decision (3-0) | 3 | 2:00 |
Won WAKO World Grand Prix 2019 K-1 -86kg Bronze Medal.
| 2019-09-26 | Win | (Poland) Maksymilian Bratkowicz | WAKO K-1 World Grand Prix 2019, Quarter Final | Prague, Czech Republic | Decision (3-0) | 3 | 2:00 |
| 2019-09-25 | Win | (Czech Republic) Nikolas Stamidis | WAKO K-1 World Grand Prix 2019, First Round | Prague, Czech Republic | Decision (3-0) | 3 | 2:00 |
Legend: Win Loss Draw/No contest Notes

== See also ==
- List of male kickboxers
