= 2027 in K-1 =

Mixed martial arts events

Information
- First date: February 11, 2027

The year 2027 is the 34th year in the history of the K-1, a global kickboxing promotion. The year started with K-1 World GP 2027 -90kg World Championship Tournament Final 16.

== List of events ==
#	Event Title	Date	Arena	Location
1	K-1 World GP 2027 -90kg World Championship Tournament Final 16	February 11, 2027		Tokyo, Japan
2	K-1 World GP 2027 -90kg World Championship Tournament Final	May 9, 2027		Tokyo, Japan

== K-1 World GP 2027 -90kg World Championship Tournament Final 16 ==
K-1 World GP 2027 -90kg World Championship Tournament Final 16
- Promotion: K-1
- Date: February 11, 2027
- City: Tokyo, Japan

K-1 World GP 2027 -90kg World Championship Tournament 16 was a kickboxing event held by K-1 on February 11, 2027, in Tokyo, Japan.

=== Background ===
The event will feature 16 cruiserweight (-90kg), 10 core K-1 fighters and 6 new competitors selected throughout worldwide qualifier tournaments all competing to be part of the upcoming 2027 K-1 World GP -90kg Final happening on May 9, 2027.

=== Fight Card ===
K-1 World GP 2027 -90kg World Championship Tournament 16
Weight Class				Method	Round	Time	Notes
Cruiserweight 90 kg	(Netherlands) Thian de Vries	vs.	TBA				K-1 World GP 2027 -90kg Final 16
Cruiserweight 90 kg	(Germany) Lukas Achterberg	vs.	TBA				K-1 World GP 2027 -90kg Final 16
Cruiserweight 90 kg	(Italy) Mattia Faraoni	vs.	TBA				K-1 World GP 2027 -90kg Final 16
Cruiserweight 90 kg	(Iran) Mahmoud Sattari	vs.	TBA				K-1 World GP 2027 -90kg Final 16
Cruiserweight 90 kg	(Russia) Nikita Kozlov	vs.	TBA				K-1 World GP 2027 -90kg Final 16
Cruiserweight 90 kg	(Brazil) João Victor	vs.	TBA				K-1 World GP 2027 -90kg Final 16
Cruiserweight 90 kg	(Germany) Robert Stoll	vs.	TBA				K-1 World GP 2027 -90kg Final 16
Cruiserweight 90 kg	(Australia) Charlie Bubb	vs.	TBA				K-1 World GP 2027 -90kg Final 16
Cruiserweight 90 kg	(Romania) Aaron Măcăilă	vs.	TBA				K-1 World GP 2027 -90kg Final 16
Cruiserweight 90 kg	(Kazakhstan) Aslan Koshiyev	vs.	TBA				K-1 World GP 2027 -90kg Final 16
Cruiserweight 90 kg	(Belarus) Nikita Kokosh	vs.	TBA				K-1 World GP 2027 -90kg Final 16
Cruiserweight 90 kg	(Romania) Vasile Corcodel	vs.	TBA				K-1 World GP 2027 -90kg Final 16
Cruiserweight 90 kg	TBA	vs.	TBA				K-1 World GP 2027 -90kg Final 16
Cruiserweight 90 kg	TBA	vs.	TBA				K-1 World GP 2027 -90kg Final 16
Super Bantamweight 55 kg	(Japan) Riamu (c)	vs.	(Japan) TBD				For the K-1 Super Bantamweight title
Preliminary Card
kg		def.					
kg		def.					

== K-1 World GP 2027 -90kg World Championship Tournament Final ==
K-1 World GP 2027 -90kg World Championship Tournament Final
- Promotion: K-1
- Date: May 9, 2027
- City: Tokyo, Japan

K-1 World GP 2027 -90kg World Championship Tournament Final was a kickboxing event held by K-1 on May 9, 2027, in Tokyo, Japan.

=== K-1 World GP 2027 -90kg Final bracket ===
Quarter-finals

Semi-finals

Final

=== Fight Card ===
K-1 World GP 2027 -90kg World Championship Tournament Final
Weight Class			Method	Round	Time	Notes
Cruiserweight 90 kg	TBA	vs.				K-1 World GP 2027 -90kg Tournament Final, Final
Cruiserweight 90 kg	TBA	vs.				K-1 World GP 2027 -90kg Tournament Final, Semifinals
Cruiserweight 90 kg	TBA	vs.				K-1 World GP 2027 -90kg Tournament Final, Semifinals
Cruiserweight 90 kg		vs.				K-1 World GP 2027 -90kg Tournament Final, Quarterfinals
Cruiserweight 90 kg		vs.				K-1 World GP 2027 -90kg Tournament Final, Quarterfinals
Cruiserweight 90 kg		vs.				K-1 World GP 2027 -90kg Tournament Final, Quarterfinals
Cruiserweight 90 kg		vs.				K-1 World GP 2027 -90kg Tournament Final, Quarterfinals
Cruiserweight 90 kg	TBA	vs.				K-1 World GP 2027 -90kg Tournament Final, Reserve
Preliminary Card
kg		def.				
kg		def.				

== See also ==
- 2027 in Glory
- 2027 in ONE Championship
- 2027 in RISE
- 2027 in Romanian kickboxing
- 2027 in Wu Lin Feng
- 2027 in Kunlun Fight
