= Charlie Bubb =

Australian Muay Thai kickboxer

- Born: November 13, 1997 (age 29); New South Wales, Australia
- Height: 188 cm (6 ft 2 in)
- Weight: 90 kg (198 lb; 14 st 2 lb)
- Division: Light Heavyweight; Cruiserweight
- Style: Muay Thai
- Stance: Orthodox
- Fighting out of: Orange, Australia
- Team: Razor MuayThai

Professional boxing record
- Total: 1
- Wins: 1
- By knockout: 0
- Losses: 0
- By knockout: 0

Kickboxing record
- Total: 41
- Wins: 36
- By knockout: 21
- Losses: 4
- By knockout: 0
- Draws: 1

Other information
- Boxing record from BoxRec

Charlie Bubb (born November 13, 1997) is an Australian professional Muay Thai fighter and kickboxer. He is the reigning WBC Muay Thai World Light Heavyweight champion.

He was ranked as the 2nd Light Heavyweight Muay Thai fighter in the world by Combat Press in January 2025 and ranked the number 1 contender by the WMO in May 2025.

== Career ==
=== Early career ===
==== Budd Vs Lund I ====
Bubb fought Lund for the first time in his career on August 20, 2016. They were fighting for the WBC Australian super middleweight title. Bubb went down in this fight and lost their first fight via split decision.

==== Budd Vs Lund II ====
Charlie Bubb fought Lund again for the Eruption Super Middleweight Title at Eruption Muay Thai 15 on May 5, 2018. Charlie Bubb won via unanimous decision after 5 rounds.

==== WKBF World Title ====
Charlie Bubb faced off against former Glory fighter Mark Timms for the WKBF World Title. He won the fight via decision and claimed his first ever world title.

==== WBC World Title Challenge ====
On June 15, 2021, Charlie Bubb fought George Mann for the Vacant WBC Light Heavyweight belt. He lost the fight via split decision.

==== Budd Vs Lund III ====
On September 23, 2023, Charlie Bubb won the right to challenge for the Light heavyweight title by facing of against Jake Lund for the 3rd time. He won via decision after 5 rounds.

=== WBC Championship ===
Bubb won the WBC Light heavyweight championship April 27, 2024 against Marcus Sundin Liljedorff via TKO in the 3rd round.

Bubb made his first WBC Light heavyweight title defence on October 19, 2024, against Jomkhon Kiatnongluang. He won via KO in the 3rd Round.

Bubb was set to defend his title February 22, 2025 against ONE Championship fighter Mouhcine Chafi, but it was canceled because Chafi couldn't get an exemption from his ONE contract.

Bubb made his second title defence August 2, 2025 against WMO Light Heavyweight and WBC Super Middleweight Champion Daniel Bonner. They did not fight for the WMO title.

== Titles and accomplishments ==
=== Muay Thai ===
- World Boxing Council
  - 2024 WBC Muay Thai World Light Heavyweight Champion
    - Two successful title defense
- World Kickboxing Federation
  - 2019 WKBF Muay Thai Light Heavyweight Champion
- Eruption Muay Thai
  - 2018 Eruption Super Middleweight Champion

=== Kickboxing ===
- K-1
  - 2026 K-1 WORLD GP -90kg Qualification in Melbourne winner
- Prince Promotions
  - 2021 Prince Promotions K-1 8-man Tournament winner

== Fight record ==
Professional Muay Thai and Kickboxing Record
36 Wins (21 (T)KO's), 4 Losses, 1 Draw
Date	Result	Opponent	Event	Location	Method	Round	Time
2027-02-11		TBA	K-1 World GP 2027 -90kg World Tournament Final 16, Quarterfinals	Tokyo, Japan			
2026-10-31	Win	(New Zealand) Leki Goetz	K-1 World GP -90kg Qualification in Melbourne, Final	Melbourne, Australia	TKO (3 knockdowns)	1	
Wins the K-1 World GP -90kg Qualification Tournament in Melbourne.
2026-10-31	Win	(Samoa) Visesio Saina	K-1 World GP -90kg Qualification in Melbourne, Semifinals	Melbourne, Australia	TKO (4 knockdowns)		
2026-10-31	Win	(New Zealand) Jabez Siafa	K-1 World GP -90kg Qualification in Melbourne, Quarterfinals	Melbourne, Australia	TKO (3 knockdowns)		
2026-04-18	Draw	(Germany) Robert Stoll	Spartans Cup Championships 26	Melbourne, Australia	Decision (Majority)	5	3:00
For the vacant SCC World Light Heavyweight (-84kg) Championship.
2025-08-02	Win	(England) Daniel Bonner	1774 Muay Thai Series - 13th Edition	Warwick Farm, Australia	Decision (Unanimous)	5	3:00
Defends the WBC Muay Thai World Light Heavyweight Championship.
2024-10-19	Win	(Thailand) Jomkhon Kiatnongluang	1774 Muay Thai Series - 11th Edition	Warwick Farm, Australia	KO (Body kick)	3	
Defends the WBC Muay Thai World Light Heavyweight Championship.
2024-04-27	Win	(Sweden) Marcus Sundin Liljedorff	Muay Thai League 10	Sopot, Poland	TKO (Doctor stoppage)	3	3:00
Wins the vacant WBC Muay Thai World Light Heavyweight Championship.
2024-02-16	Win	(Brazil) Ravy Brunow	AFS : Australia vs The World	Dubai, United Arab Emirates	Decision (Split)	3	3:00
2023-12-09	Win	(Australia) Daniel Kerr	Battle in the Bush 8	Orange, Australia	TKO		
2023-09-23	Win	(Australia) Jake Lund	Muay Thai League 8	Southport, Australia	Decision	5	3:00
WBC Muay Thai World title eliminator.
2022-12-10	Win	(Australia) Jay Tonkin	Hardcore Promotions 8	Warwick Farm, Australia	TKO (retirement)	4	3:00
2022-10-29	Win	(Thailand) Tom Parinya	MTGP - Perth	Midland, Australia	Decision (Majority)	5	3:00
2022-07-16	Win	(United States) Will Chope	Infliction Fight Series 30	Palm Beach, Australia	KO (Body kick)	2	
2022-05-28	Win	(New Zealand) Hayden Todd	Muay Thai League 4	Southport, Australia	TKO (Doctor stoppage)	2	
2021-06-05	Loss	(Scotland) George Mann	MTGP - Perth	Perth, Australia	Decision (Split)		
For the WBC Light heavyweight Championship.
2021-03-06	Win	(Australia) Jayden Eynaud	Prince Promotions K-1 Tournament, Final	Melbourne, Australia	Decision (Unanimous)	3	3:00
Wins the 2021 Prince Promotions Super Middleweight 8-man Tournament title.
2021-03-06	Win	(Australia) Sarmad Jahanara	Prince Promotions K-1 Tournament, Semifinals	Melbourne, Australia	TKO	2	
2021-03-06	Win	(Australia) Daniel Barber	Prince Promotions K-1 Tournament, Quarterfinals	Melbourne, Australia	Decision (Unanimous)	3	3:00
2019-09-14	Win	(Australia) James Honey	Eruption Muay Thai	Brisbane, Australia	Decision	5	3:00
2019-08-30	Win	(Australia) Jayden Eynaud	Eruption Muay Thai 18	Mansfield, Victoria, Australia	TKO (3 Knockdowns)	1	
2019-06-15	Win	(Australia) David Pennimpede	Tag Team Championship	Easton Hill, Australia	TKO	4	
2019-06-01	Win	(United Kingdom) Mark Timms	Kaos 2	Bruce, Australia	Decision		
Wins the WKBF Light heavyweight Championship.
2019-04-27	Win	(Turkey) Vedat Hödük	Kings Of Kombat 24	Melbourne, Australia	Decision (Unanimous)	5	3:00
2019-03-22	Win	(Australia) Eddie Farrell	Eruption Muay Thai 17	Mansfield, Victoria, Australia	TKO (Low kicks)	4	
2018-12-01	Win	(Australia) Lyndon Bin Doraho	Eruption Muay Thai 16		KO (left hook to the body)	4	1:27
2018-10-27	Win	(Australia) Stephan Lottering	Domination Muay Thai 21	Perth, Australia	Decision (Unanimous)	3	3:00
2018-05-05	Win	(Australia) Jake Lund	Eruption Muay Thai 15	Mansfield, Australia	Decision (Unanimous)	5	3:00
Wins the Eruption Super Middleweight Championship.
2017-10-28	Loss	(Australia) Toby Smith	Domination Muay Thai 19	Perth, Australia	Decision	5	3:00
2016-11-13	Win	(Australia) Brett McCluskey	Rebellion Muay Thai 12		Decision		
2016-10-16	Win	(Australia) Odin Daniels	Siam Pro Muay Thai		Decision		
2016-08-20	Loss	(Australia) Jake Lund			Decision		3:00
2016-07-	Loss	(Australia) Alex Ilijoski	Powaerplay Promotions	Melbourne, Australia	Decision (Split)	5	3:00
2016-01-10	Win	(Thailand) Jujoam Teedetlongerma	Super Muaythai	Bangkok, Thailand	TKO (Doctor stoppage)	2	
2016-01-10	Win	(Poland) Marcin Parcheta	Super Muaythai	Bangkok, Thailand	TKO (Doctor stoppage)	2	
Legend: Win Loss Draw/No contest Notes

== Professional boxing record ==
1 fight	1 win	0 losses
By decision	1	0

No.	Result	Record	Opponent	Type	Round, time	Date	Location	Notes
1	Win	1–0	Asher Wolff	UD	4	Nov 9, 2019	Towac Park Racecourse, New South Wales, Orange, Australia	

== Notes ==
- ERUPTION Muay Thai 15
- Prince Promotions 8 man k1 eliminator melbourne details
