= Mamuka Usubyan =

Russian kickboxer

- Born: October 2, 1994 (age 32); Shamiram, Armenia
- Native name: Мамука Усубян
- Nationality: Russian
- Height: 1.80 m (5 ft 11 in)
- Weight: 71 kg (157 lb; 11.2 st)
- Style: Kickboxing
- Stance: Southpaw
- Fighting out of: Yekaterinburg, Russia
- Team: Arkangel Mikhail
- Trainer: Anton Glazyrin
- Years active: 2017 – present

Professional boxing record
- Total: 1
- Wins: 1
- By knockout: 0
- Losses: 0

Kickboxing record
- Total: 28
- Wins: 24
- By knockout: 2
- Losses: 4
- By knockout: 0
- Draws: 0
- No contests: 0

Other information
- Boxing record from BoxRec

Mamuka Usubyan (born October 2, 1994) is a Russian-Yazidi professional boxer and kickboxer, and the current Fair Fight lightweight champion. As of May 2022 he was the #10 ranked lightweight in the world by Combat Press.

== Career ==
=== Fair Fight ===
==== Early career ====
Usubyan faced Dokka Gurmaev at Fair Fight IX on March 21, 2020, in his first fight of the year. He won the bout by unanimous decision. Usubyan then faced Nilmongkorn Ohh at Fair Fight IX on July 8, 2020. He won the fight by a first-round knockout, the first stoppage win of his career. Usubyan next faced Arbi Emiev at Fair Fight XII on August 29, 2020. He won the fight by unanimous decision. Usubyan faced Stanislav Kazantsev at RCC 8: Martynov vs. Enomoto on December 19, 2020. He won the fight by unanimous decision.

==== Lightweight champion ====
Usubyan faced the former Fair Fight lightweight champion Alexander Skvortsov for the vacant Fair Fight lightweight belt at Fair Fight XIV on March 6, 2021. He won the fight by unanimous decision. Usubyan then faced Itay Gershon in a non-title bout at RCC 9 on May 3, 2021. He won this bout by unanimous decision as well.

Usubyan made his first Fair Fight lightweight title defense against Milan Pales at Fair Fight XV on August 28, 2021. He won the fight by unanimous decision.

Usubyan faced Vitale Matei in a non-title bout at RCC: Intro 16 on October 16, 2021. He won the fight by unanimous decision. Usubyan faced Milson Castro in another non-title fight at RCC 10 on December 18, 2021. He once again won the fight by unanimous decision.

Usubyan was booked to make his second Fair Fight lightweight title defense against the former Fair Fight welterweight champion Zhora Akopyan at Fair Fight XVII on April 16, 2022. He won the fight by unanimous decision.

Usubyan faced Ivan Kondratiev in a non-title bout at RCC 12 on August 26, 2022. He won the fight by unanimous decision, with all three judges scoring the bout 30–27 in his favor.

Usubyan made his third Fair Fight title defense against Aleksei Ulianov at RCC Fair Fight 19 on November 26, 2022. He won the fight by a split decision. Due to the close nature of their first bout, an immediate rematch was booked for RCC Fair Fight 20 on February 18, 2023. Usubyan withdrew from the fight on January 31, 2023, after suffering a broken fibula in sparring.

Usubyan faced the one-time ONE Featherweight Muay Thai World title challenger Jamal Yusupov in a non-title bout at RCC Fair Fight 21 on June 10, 2023. He lost the fight by unanimous decision, after an extra fourth round was contested.

Usubyan faced Dzhabar Askerov in a non-title bout at RCC Fair Fight XXIII on October 28, 2023. He won the fight by unanimous decision.

== Boxing career ==
Usubyan made his professional boxing debut against Pavel Mamontov on July 9, 2022. He won the fight by unanimous decision.

== Championships and accomplishments ==
Professional

- Fair Fight
  - 2021 Fair Fight Lightweight (−71 kg) Championship
    - Three successful title defenses

Amateur

- World Association of Kickboxing Organizations
  - (silver) 2019 WAKO World Grand Prix (−71 kg)

== Kickboxing and Muay Thai record ==
Professional Kickboxing record
24 Wins (2 (T)KOs), 4 Losses, 0 Draw
| Date | Result | Opponent | Event | Location | Method | Round | Time |
| 2026-11-07 | Loss | (China) Zhou Jiaqiang | ONE Fight Night 49 | Bangkok, Thailand | Decision (Split) | 3 | 3:00 |
| 2026-08-07 | Loss | (Armenia) Marat Grigorian | ONE: The Inner Circle 25 | Bangkok, Thailand | Decision (Unanimous) | 3 | 3:00 |
ONE Samurai Featherweight Kickboxing Tournament Quarterfinal.
| 2026-06-12 | Win | (France) Enzo Kartoum | ONE Friday Fights 158, Lumpinee Stadium | Bangkok, Thailand | Decision (Unanimous) | 3 | 3:00 |
| 2026-02-06 | Win | (Morocco) Yassin Airad | ONE Friday Fights 141, Lumpinee Stadium | Bangkok, Thailand | Decision (Unanimous) | 3 | 3:00 |
| 2025-02-08 | Win | (Iran) Masoud Minaei | RCC Fair Fight 29 | Yekaterinburg, Russia | Decision (Unanimous) | 3 | 3:00 |
| 2024-08-16 | Win | (Thailand) Khunsuek SuperbonTrainingCamp | ONE Friday Fights 75, Lumpinee Stadium | Bangkok, Thailand | KO (Left cross) | 2 | 2:16 |
| 2024-02-16 | Win | (Thailand) Shadow Singmawynn | ONE Friday Fights 52, Lumpinee Stadium | Bangkok, Thailand | Decision (Unanimous) | 3 | 3:00 |
| 2023-10-28 | Win | (Russia) Dzhabar Askerov | RCC Fair Fight XXIII | Yekaterinburg, Russia | Decision (Unanimous) | 3 | 3:00 |
| 2023-07-29 | Win | (Czech Republic) Patrik Záděra | Yangames Fight Night | Prague, Czech Republic | Decision (Unanimous) | 3 | 3:00 |
| 2023-06-10 | Loss | (Russia) Jamal Yusupov | RCC Fair Fight 21 | Yekaterinburg, Russia | Ext.R Decision (Unanimous) | 4 | 3:00 |
| 2022-11-26 | Win | (Russia) Aleksei Ulianov | RCC Fair Fight 19 | Yekaterinburg, Russia | Decision (Split) | 5 | 3:00 |
Defends the Fair Fight lightweight (−71 kg) title.
| 2022-08-26 | Win | (Russia) Ivan Kondratiev | RCC 12 | Yekaterinburg, Russia | Decision (Unanimous) | 3 | 3:00 |
| 2022-04-16 | Win | (Armenia) Zhora Akopyan | Fair Fight XVII | Yekaterinburg, Russia | Decision (Unanimous) | 5 | 3:00 |
Defends the Fair Fight lightweight (−71 kg) title.
| 2021-12-18 | Win | (Brazil) Milson Castro | RCC 10 | Yekaterinburg, Russia | Decision (Unanimous) | 3 | 3:00 |
| 2021-10-16 | Win | (Moldova) Vitalie Matei | RCC: Intro 16 | Yekaterinburg, Russia | Decision (Unanimous) | 3 | 3:00 |
| 2021-08-28 | Win | (Slovakia) Milan Paleš | Fair Fight XV | Yekaterinburg, Russia | Decision (Unanimous) | 5 | 3:00 |
Defends the Fair Fight lightweight (−71 kg) title.
| 2021-05-03 | Win | (Israel) Itay Gershon | RCC 9 | Yekaterinburg, Russia | Decision (Unanimous) | 3 | 3:00 |
| 2021-03-06 | Win | (Russia) Alexander Skvortsov | Fair Fight XIV | Yekaterinburg, Russia | Decision (Unanimous) | 5 | 3:00 |
Wins the vacant Fair Fight lightweight (−71 kg) title.
| 2020-12-19 | Win | (Ukraine) Stanislav Kazantsev | RCC 8 | Yekaterinburg, Russia | Decision (Unanimous) | 3 | 3:00 |
| 2020-08-29 | Win | (Chechnya) Arbi Emiev | Fair Fight XII | Yekaterinburg, Russia | Decision (Unanimous) | 3 | 3:00 |
| 2020-07-08 | Win | (Thailand) Nilmongkorn Ohh | Fair Fight XI | Yekaterinburg, Russia | KO (Left hook) | 1 | |
| 2020-03-21 | Win | (Russia) Dokka Gurmaev | Fair Fight IX | Yekaterinburg, Russia | Decision (Unanimous) | 3 | 3:00 |
| 2019-04-21 | Win | (Russia) Evgeny Vorontsov | Fair Fight VIII | Yekaterinburg, Russia | Decision (Split) | 3 | 3:00 |
| 2017-09-30 | Win | (Russia) Andrei Chekhonin | Fair Fight IV | Yekaterinburg, Russia | Decision (Unanimous) | 3 | 3:00 |
| 2017-06-21 | Win | (Russia) Denis Burmatov | Fair Fight III | Yekaterinburg, Russia | Decision (Unanimous) | 3 | 3:00 |
| 2017-04-14 | Loss | (Russia) Arseniy Smirnov | Fair Fight II | Yekaterinburg, Russia | Decision (Unanimous) | 3 | 3:00 |
| 2017-01- | Win | (Kazakhstan) Sher Mamazulunov | Fair Fight I | Yekaterinburg, Russia | Decision | 3 | 3:00 |
Legend: Win Loss Draw/No contest Notes

Amateur Kickboxing record
| Date | Result | Opponent | Event | Location | Method | Round | Time |
|---|---|---|---|---|---|---|---|
| 2019-09-28 | Loss | (Belarus) Maksim Spodarenko | 2019 WAKO K-1 World Grand Prix, Tournament Final | Prague, Czech Republic | Decision | 3 | 3:00 |
Wins the 2019 WAKO K-1 World Grand Prix (−71 kg) Silver Medal.
Legend: Win Loss Draw/No contest Notes

== Professional boxing record ==
| 1 fight | 1 win | 0 losses |
|---|---|---|
| By decision | 1 | 0 |

| No. | Result | Record | Opponent | Type | Round, time | Date | Location | Notes |
|---|---|---|---|---|---|---|---|---|
| 1 | Win | 1–0 | Pavel Mamontov | UD | 4 | Jul 9, 2022 | KRK "Uralets", Yekaterinburg, Russia | |

== See also ==
- List of male kickboxers
