= Jonas Salsicha =

Brazilian professional kickboxer (born 1994)

- Born: Jonas Julio Sebastião Ferreira; 25 May 1994 (age 32); São Paulo, Brazil
- Height: 1.90 m (6 ft 3 in)
- Weight: 70.0 kg (154.3 lb; 11.02 st)
- Division: Lightweight; Welterweight
- Style: Kickboxing
- Stance: Orthodox
- Fighting out of: São Paulo, Brazil
- Team: Tercio Fight Team; Nova Geração (former)
- Trainer: Allan Popeye

Kickboxing record
- Total: 33
- Wins: 29
- By knockout: 10
- Losses: 4
- By knockout: 1
- Draws: 0

Mixed martial arts record
- Total: 6
- Wins: 4
- By knockout: 4
- Losses: 2
- By knockout: 1
- By submission: 1

Other information
- Mixed martial arts record from Sherdog

Jonas Julio Sebastião Ferreira (born 25 May 1994), better known as Jonas Salsicha, is a Brazilian kickboxer and mixed martial artist. He is the 2025 K-1 World MAX Champion.

== Kickboxing career ==
=== Early career ===
Salsicha faced Patrick Furtado in the 2018 WGP Kickboxing Challenger Grand Prix, held to determine the next Super Middleweight title challenger, on May 18, 2018. He won the fight by a third-round technical knockout and advanced to the tournament finals, where he faced Alex Sandro. Salsicha won the fight by unanimous decision.

=== WGP Kickboxing ===
Salsicha challenged the WGP Super Middleweight champion Diego Gaúcho at WGP Kickboxing 53 on April 6, 2019. He captured the title by unanimous decision. Salsicha made his first WGP Super Middleweight title defense against Ravy Brunow at WGP Kickboxing 60 on November 23, 2019. He retained the belt by split decision.

Salsicha faced Victor Valenzuela in a non-title bout at WGP Kickboxing 64 on November 20, 2021. He won the fight by a third-round knockout.

On January 28, 2023 Jonas Salsicha made his Glory debut at Glory Rivals 5 in Tulum, Mexico. He fought Argentinian Javier Aparicio and lost by knock out in the first round.

On March 25, 2023, Salsicha participated in the Super Middleweight All Star Grand Prix Finals at WGP 68. He lost in the semi final against Gustavo Jones.

Salsicha faced Lucas Rafael at WGP Kickboxing 71 on July 9, 2023. He won the fight by split decision.

On December 12, 2023, Salsicha defended his WGP Super Middleweight title against Gustavo Jones at WGP 72. He lost the fight after 5 rounds by split decision.

=== K-1 ===
Salsicha faced Marcio De Jesus in the quarterfinals of the 2025 K-1 World MAX South American Round on June 28, 2025. He won the fight by unanimous decision and advanced to the semifinals of the one-day tournament, where he faced Jones Coliseu. Salsicha once again prevailed by unanimous decision and faced André Martins in the tournament finals. He won the fight and the tournament title by unanimous decision.

Salsicha faced Salimkhan Ibragimov at K-1 World MAX 2025 - 70kg World Tournament Opening Round in the opening round of the 2025 World MAX on September 7, 2025. He won the fight by unanimous decision.

On November 15, 2025, Salsicha took part in the K-1 World MAX 2025 - 70kg World Championship Tournament Final. In the quarterfinals he defeated reigning K-1 Super Welterweight champion Ouyang Feng by unanimous decision. In the semifinals he won by technical knockout in 30 seconds against reservist Jonathan Aiulu. In the tournament final he defeated Darryl Verdonk by first round knockout with a body kick to become the 2025 K-1 World MAX tournament winner.

== Titles and accomplishments ==
- K-1
  - K-1 World MAX 2025 South America Qualifier Tournament Winner
  - K-1 World MAX 2025 World Championship Tournament Final Winner
  - 2025 K-1 Fighter of the Year
  - 2026 K-1 Super Welterweight (−70kg) Champion
- WGP Kickboxing
  - 2018 WGP Supper Middleweight (-78.1 kg) Challenger Grand Prix Winner
  - 2019 WGP Super Middleweight (-78.1 kg) Champion
    - One successful title defense
- Awards
  - Beyond Kickboxing’s 2025 Breakthrough Fighter of the Year

== Kickboxing and Muay Thai record ==
Professional Muay Thai and Kickboxing record
29 Wins (10 KOs), 4 Losses, 0 Draw
Date	Result	Opponent	Event	Location	Method	Round	Time
2026-12-29		(Netherlands) Jayjay Morris	K-1 World MAX 2026 - World Championship Tournament Final, Quarterfinals	Yokohama, Japan			
2026-09-12	Win	(Armenia) Zhora Akopyan	K-1 World MAX 2026 - World Tournament Opening Round	Tokyo, Japan	Decision (unanimous)	3	3:00
Qualifies for the 2026 K-1 World MAX World Championship Tournament Final.
2026-04-11	Win	(Netherlands) Darryl Verdonk	K-1 Genki 2026	Tokyo, Japan	Decision (unanimous)	3	3:00
Wins the vacant K-1 Super Welterweight (−70kg) title.
2025-11-15	Win	(Netherlands) Darryl Verdonk	K-1 World MAX 2025 - 70kg World Championship Tournament Final, Final	Tokyo, Japan	KO (body kick)	1	2:30
Wins the 2025 K-1 World MAX World Championship Tournament Final.
2025-11-15	Win	(Samoa) Jonathan Aiulu	K-1 World MAX 2025 - 70kg World Championship Tournament Final, Semifinals	Tokyo, Japan	TKO (2 knockdowns)	1	0:33
2025-11-15	Win	(China) Ouyang Feng	K-1 World MAX 2025 - 70kg World Championship Tournament Final, Quarterfinals	Tokyo, Japan	Decision (unanimous)	3	3:00
2025-09-07	Win	(Russia) Salimkhan Ibragimov	K-1 World MAX 2025 - 70kg World Tournament Opening Round	Tokyo, Japan	Decision (unanimous)	3	3:00
Qualifies for the 2025 K-1 World MAX World Championship Tournament Final.
2025-06-28	Win	(Brazil) André Martins	K-1 World MAX 2025 - South American Round, Final	São José dos Pinhais, Brazil	Decision (unanimous)	3	3:00
Wins the 2025 K-1 World MAX South America Qualifier Tournament.
2025-06-28	Win	(Brazil) Jones Coliseu	K-1 World MAX 2025 - South American Round, Semifinals	São José dos Pinhais, Brazil	Decision (unanimous)	3	3:00
2025-06-28	Win	(Brazil) Marcio De Jesus	K-1 World MAX 2025 - South American Round, Quarterfinals	São José dos Pinhais, Brazil	Decision (unanimous)	3	3:00
2023-12-15	Loss	(Brazil) Gustavo Sousa	WGP Kickboxing 72	Brasília, Brazil	Decision (split)	5	3:00
Loses the WGP Super Middleweight title.
2023-07-09	Win	(Brazil) Lucas Rafael	WGP Kickboxing 71	Sao Paulo, Brazil	Decision (split)	3	3:00
2023-03-25	Loss	(Brazil) Gustavo Sousa	WGP Kickboxing 68 - All Star GP, Semifinals	Brasília, Brazil	Decision (split)	3	3:00
2023-01-28	Loss	(Argentina) Javier Aparicio	Glory Rivals 5	Tulum, Mexico	KO (uppercut)	1	1:10
2021-11-20	Win	(Chile) Victor Valenzuela	WGP Kickboxing 64	Brasilia, Brazil	KO (left hook)	3	2:11
2019-11-23	Win	(Brazil) Ravy Brunow	WGP Kickboxing 60	Balneário Camboriú, Brazil	Decision (split)	5	3:00
Defends the WGP Super Middleweight (-78.1kg) title.
2019-04-06	Win	(Brazil) Diego Gaúcho	WGP Kickboxing 53	Sao Paulo, Brazil	Decision (unanimous)	5	3:00
Wins the WGP Super Middleweight (-78.1kg) title.
2018-05-18	Win	(Brazil) Alex Sandro	WGP Kickboxing 46 - Challenger GP, Final	Sao Paulo, Brazil	Decision (unanimous)	3	3:00
2018-05-18	Win	(Brazil) Patrick Furtado	WGP Kickboxing 46 - Challenger GP, Semifinals	Sao Paulo, Brazil	TKO (left hook)	3	2:10
2018-02-23	Win	(Brazil) Kaio Modric	WGP Kickboxing 44	Sao Paulo, Brazil	Decision (Unanimous)	3	3:00
2017-11-12	Win	(Brazil) Maicon Junior	WGP Kickboxing 42	Sao Paulo, Brazil	Decision (Unanimous)	3	3:00
2017-05-20	Loss	(Brazil) Mattheus Munoz	Epic Muay Thai Brazil 2	Sao Paulo, Brazil	Decision (Unanimous)	5	3:00
2017-04-02	Win	(Brazil) Erick Komatsu	Epic Muay Thai Brazil	Sao Paulo, Brazil	Decision (Unanimous)	3	3:00
2016-09-	Win	(Brazil) Dario	TFC 5	Brazil	Decision (Unanimous)	3	3:00
2016-06-04	Win	(Brazil) Erasmo Margutti	Top Thai IV	Sao Paulo, Brazil	Decision (Unanimous)	3	3:00
2016-05-21	Win	(Brazil) Cicero Evangelista	Gibi Thai Copa XXV	Brazil	Decision (Unanimous)	3	3:00
Legend: Win Loss Draw/No contest Notes

== Mixed martial arts record ==
Professional record breakdown
6 matches	4 wins	2 losses
By knockout	4	1
By submission	0	1
By decision	0	0

Res.	Record	Opponent	Method	Event	Date	Round	Time	Location	Notes
Loss	4–2	Richard Silva	TKO (punches)	Jungle Fight 130	28 September 2024	1	4:04	Sao Paulo, Brazil	
Win	4–1	Vinicius Silva	KO (punches)	SFT 50	17 August 2024	1	0:10	Sao Paulo, Brazil	
Win	3–1	Fernando Willians	TKO (punches)	SFT 48: Sousa vs. Soldado	8 June 2024	1	1:29	Sao Paulo, Brazil	Lightweight debut.
Win	2–1	Christian Alves	KO (left hook)	Bison Kombat 3	30 September 2023	1	0:21	Sao Paulo, Brazil	
Loss	1–1	Francisco Ataliba	Submission (anaconda choke)	Fight Pro Championship 1	5 March 2022	1	2:57	Sao Paulo, Brazil	
Win	1–0	Jampierre Anselmo	TKO	Arena Global 11	6 June 2021	1	1:47	Rio de Janeiro, Brazil	Welterweight debut.

== See also ==
- List of male kickboxers
