= Darryl Verdonk =

Dutch kickboxer

- Born: March 28, 1996 (age 30); Dordrecht, Netherlands
- Height: 1.77 m (5 ft 10 in)
- Weight: 70 kg (150 lb; 11 st)
- Style: Kickboxing
- Stance: Orthodox
- Fighting out of: Dordrecht, Netherlands
- Team: Fight Team Ringer
- Trainer: Rob Vernes/John van Dijk

Kickboxing record
- Total: 28
- Wins: 18
- By knockout: 11
- Losses: 10
- By knockout: 2
- Draws: 0
- No contests: 0

Other information
- Notable relatives: Calvin Verdonk (brother)

Darryl Verdonk (born 28 March 1996) is a Dutch kickboxer. He is the former Enfusion Lightweight Champion and a K-1 World MAX veteran.

== Career ==
Verdonk faced Khali Kutukcu at Enfusion Talents 79 on February 29, 2020. He won the fight by decision.

Verdonk faced Vaggelis Sumpakas on March 26, 2022, at Enfusion #105. He won the fight by first-round technical knockout.

On September 24, 2022, Verdonk faced Younes Smaili for the vacant Enfusion -70 kg title at Enfusion 112 in Eindhoven. Verdonk won the fight and the belt by technical knockout in the fourth round after Smaili retired due to a rib injury.

Verdonk made the first defense of his Enfusion lightweight title on February 11, 2023, against Ilias Zouggary at Enfusion 118. He lost the fight by technical knockout in the fifth round.

Verdonk faced Hiromi Wajima at K-1 World MAX 2024 - World Tournament Opening Round on March 20, 2024. He won the fight by a first-round technical knockout and qualified for the K-1 World MAX 2024 World Championship Final.

Verdonk was scheduled to face Dengue Silva as a quarterfinal of the 2024 K-1 Woirld MAX Tournament. He lost the fight by unanimous decision.

On October 5, 2024, Verdonk faced Zhora Akopyan at K-1 World GP 2024 in Osaka. He won the fight by extension round unanimous decision.

== Titles and accomplishments ==
- Enfusion
  - 2022 Enfusion Lightweight (-70kg) World Championship
- K-1
  - 2025 K-1 World MAX World Championship Tournament runner-up
  - 2025 K-1 Fight of the Year (vs. Stoyan Koprivlenski)

== Kickboxing record ==
Kickboxing record
18 wins (11 (T)KOs), 10 losses, 0 draws
Date	Result	Opponent	Event	Location	Method	Round	Time
2026-11-23		(South Korea) Hyun Jun Kim	K-1 Revenge II	Tokyo, Japan			
2026-09-12	Loss	(Italy) Lorenzo Di Vara	K-1 World MAX 2026 - World Tournament Opening Round	Tokyo, Japan	Decision (unanimous)	3	3:00
Fails to qualify for the 2026 K-1 World MAX World Championship Tournament Final.
2026-04-11	Loss	(Brazil) Jonas Salsicha	K-1 Genki 2026	Tokyo, Japan	Decision (unanimous)	3	3:00
For the vacant K-1 Super Welterweight (−70kg) title.
2025-11-15	Loss	(Brazil) Jonas Salsicha	K-1 World MAX 2025 - World Championship Tournament Final, Final	Tokyo, Japan	KO (body kick)	1	2:30
For K-1 World MAX 2025 World Championship Tournament Final title.
2025-11-15	Win	(Bulgaria) Stoyan Koprivlenski	K-1 World MAX 2025 - World Championship Tournament Final, Semifinals	Tokyo, Japan	KO (right hook)	3	0:46
2025-11-15	Win	(Senegal) Alassane Kamara	K-1 World MAX 2025 - World Championship Tournament Final, Quarterfinals	Tokyo, Japan	Ext.R decision (unanimous)	4	3:00
2025-09-07	Win	(Kyrgyzstan) Nurtilek Zhalynbekov	K-1 World MAX 2025 - World Tournament Opening Round	Tokyo, Japan	TKO (3 knockdowns)	1	2:18
Qualifies for K-1 World MAX 2025 World Championship Tournament Final.
2025-05-31	Loss	(China) Ouyang Feng	K-1 Beyond	Yokohama, Japan	Decision (unanimous)	3	3:00
For the K-1 Super Welterweight (−70kg) title.
2025-02-09	Win	(Thailand) Jomthong StrikerGym	K-1 World MAX 2025	Tokyo, Japan	KO (spinning back fist)	1	1:04
2024-10-05	Win	(Armenia) Zhora Akopyan	K-1 World GP 2024 in Osaka	Osaka, Japan	Ext.R decision (unanimous)	4	3:00
2024-07-07	Loss	(Brazil) Dengue Silva	K-1 World MAX 2024 - World Championship Tournament Final, Quarter Finals	Tokyo, Japan	Decision (unanimous)	3	3:00
2024-03-20	Win	(Japan) Hiromi Wajima	K-1 World MAX 2024 - World Tournament Opening Round	Tokyo, Japan	TKO (punches)	1	3:00
Qualifies for the K-1 World MAX 2024 World Championship Final.
2023-11-05	Win	(Belgium) Bilal Abdelouahab	The Gym Fight Night	Apeldoorn, Netherlands	KO (punches)	1	
2023-02-11	Loss	(Morocco) Ilias Zouggary	Enfusion 118	Nijmegen, Netherlands	TKO (ref.stop/punches)	5	1:39
Loses the Enfusion Lightweight (-70kg) World Championship.
2022-09-24	Win	(Morocco) Younes Smaili	Enfusion 112	Eindhoven, Netherlands	TKO (retirement/injury)	4	
Wins the vacant Enfusion Lightweight (-70kg) World Championship.
2022-03-26	Win	(Greece) Vaggelis Sumpakas	Enfusion 105	Alkmaar, Netherlands	TKO (punches)	1	
2021-09-05	Win	(France) Yacine Bedfiaf	Enfusion 102	Alkmaar, Netherlands	Decision	3	3:00
2021-07-24	Loss	(Italy) Angelo Volpe	Vendetta Fight Night	Sciacca, Italy	Decision	5	3:00
For the vacant A.F.S.O. K-1 Welterweight International title.
2020-02-29	Win	(Turkey) Khalil Kutukcu	Enfusion Talents 79	Eindhoven, Netherlands	Decision	3	3:00
2019-11-23	Loss	(France) Alexis Laugeois	Tiger's Fights, Tournament Final	Dijon, France	Decision	3	3:00
2019-11-23	Win	(France) Sabri Sadouki	Tiger's Fights, Tournament Semifinals	Dijon, France	Decision	3	3:00
2019-10-05	Win	(Netherlands) Bahez Khoshnaw	Enfusion 88	Dordrecht, Netherlands	Decision (unanimous)	3	3:00
2019-05-25	Win	(Romania) David Constantin	Urban Legend 7	Constanța, Romania	TKO (body punches)	2	0:49
2018-12-01	Win	(Netherlands) Isaias Fereira	Kickboksgala	Leeuwarden, Netherlands	KO (punches)	3	
2018-10-26	Loss	(Czech Republic) Michal Krčmáč	Heroes Gate 21	Prague, Czech Republic	Decision	3	3:00
2018-05-06	Loss	(France) Issam Hamdoune	EFC 9, Tournament Semifinals	Dijon, France	Decision	3	3:00
2018-04-07	Win	(Belgium) Nana Owusu	Kickboksgala	Netherlands	KO (punches)		
2018-02-03	Win	(Germany) Maurice Lohner	Holzken Gym	Helmond, Netherlands	Decision	3	3:00
2018-01-20	Loss	(Romania) Andrei Pisari	Super Pro Fight Night	Sibiu, Romania	Decision	3	3:00
2017-12-02	Win	(Morocco) Yassin Ambari	Enfusion Talents 44	The Hague, Netherlands	KO (high kick)	1	
A-class debut.
2017-05-27	Win	(Belgium) Cedric de Breakenier	Ypenburg Fight Day 11	The Hague, Netherlands	TKO	1	
2017-04-22	Win	(Netherlands) Gavey Kubens	Ringer Rage	Dordrecht, Netherlands	KO		
2017-03-04	Win	(Netherlands) Aslan Pitronella	Ypenburg Fight Day 10	The Hague, Netherlands	TKO	3	
2016-09-18	Win	(Romania) Bogdan Suru	ACB KB 7: Bloody Night	Cluj-Napoca, Romania	KO (spinning back fist)	3	1:00
Legend: Win Loss Draw/no contest Notes

== Personal life ==
His younger brother, Calvin Verdonk, is a professional footballer.
