= Jomthong Chuwattana =

Thai Muay Thai fighter and kickboxer (born 1989)

- Born: Thanakorn Pawachart; July 28, 1989 (age 37); Maha Chana Chai District, Yasothon Province
- Native name: ธนากร พวาชาติ
- Other names: Jomtong Pomkwannarong; Jomthong Signwangcha
- Height: 175 cm (5 ft 9 in)
- Division: Bantamweight; Featherweight; Super Featherweight; Welterweight; Super Welterweight
- Style: Muay Thai
- Fighting out of: Bangkok, Thailand
- Team: Chuwattana Gym; Sit-O (former)
- Trainer: Aed
- Years active: 1997–present

Professional boxing record
- Total: 10
- Wins: 9
- By knockout: 4
- Losses: 1

Kickboxing record
- Total: 263
- Wins: 211
- Losses: 48
- By knockout: 4
- Draws: 4

Other information
- Boxing record from BoxRec

Thanakorn Pawachart (Thai: ธนากร พวาชาติ; born July 28, 1989), known professionally as Jomthong Chuwattana (Thai: จอมทอง ชูวัฒนะ), is a Thai professional Muay Thai fighter, kickboxer, and former boxer. He is a five-time Rajadamnern Stadium champion across four divisions, the 2006 Sports Writers Association of Thailand Fighter of the Year, and also challenged for a WBA World Super Featherweight title in boxing.

== Biography ==
Jomthong Chuwattana (จอมทอง ชูวัฒนะ) was born as Thanakorn Pawachart (ธนากร พวาชาติ) in Maha Chana Chai District, Yasothon Province in Northeastern region of Thailand. He had his first fight at the age of 8.

Jomthong is a young fighter from the Chuwattana camp in Thailand. Making his name by defeating the famous Anuwat Kaewsamrit, Jomthong captured two of the most prestigious titles in Muaythai.

== Career ==
Jomthong was a prominent Muaythai Champion on the circuit. In 2004 he became at only 15 years, Rajadamnern Stadium Champion. In 2006 he was awarded the title of best fighter of the year after winning another Rajadamnern Stadium title versus Anuwat and also becoming WMC World Champion. This fighter fought in his category in 2007 and 2008, losing in front of the star Saenchai Sor Kingstar.

He knocked out Deng Zeqi in round one at MAX Muay Thai 3 in Zhengzhou, China on August 10, 2013.

For professional boxing Jomthong has a record of nine wins in a row and has challenged the WBA Super Featherweight world championship with the undefeated Japanese title holder Takashi Uchiyama at Ota City General Gymnasium, Tokyo, Japan on May 6, 2015, he was quickly defeated by TKO in the early second round.

== Titles and accomplishments ==
=== Boxing ===
- 2012 OPBF Super Featherweight (130 lbs) Champion (4 defenses)
- 2012 ABCO Continental Super Featherweight (130 lbs) Champion
- 2012 WBC All Asia Super Featherweight (130 lbs) Champion

=== Kickboxing ===
- Wu Lin Feng (WLF)
  - 2018 Wu Lin Feng World Cup Welterweight (147 lbs) runner-up
- Kunlun Fight
  - 2016 Kunlun Fight World Max Super Welterweight (154 lbs) Tournament runner-up

=== Muay Thai ===
- Rajadamnern Stadium
  - 2020 Rajadamnern Welterweight (147 lbs) Champion
  - 2010 Rajadamnern Super Featherweight (130 lbs) Champion (1 defense)
  - 2009 Rajadamnern Stadium Fighter of the Year
  - 2009 Rajadamnern Featherweight (126 lbs) Champion
  - 2006 Rajadamnern Stadium Fighter of the Year
  - 2006 Rajadamnern Stadium Fight of the Year (vs. Anuwat Kaewsamrit)
  - 2006 Rajadamnern Featherweight (126 lbs) Champion
  - 2004 Rajadamnern Bantamweight (118 lbs) Champion
- World Boxing Council Muay Thai
  - 2012 WBC Muay Thai World Lightweight (135 lbs) Champion (1 defense)
  - 2011 WBC Muay Thai World Lightweight (135 lbs) Champion
  - 2009 WBC Muay Thai World Featherweight (126 lbs) Champion (1 defense)
  - 2008 WBC Muay Thai World Featherweight (126 lbs) Champion
- World Muay Thai Council
  - 2006 WMC World Featherweight (126 lbs) Champion
- Awards
  - 2006 Sports Writers Association of Thailand Fighter of the Year
  - 2012 WBC Asia Fight of the Year (vs. Ranel Suco on November 24)

== Professional boxing record ==
Key to abbreviations used for results
DQ	Disqualification	RTD	Corner retirement
KO	Knockout	SD	Split decision / split draw
MD	Majority decision / majority draw	TD	Technical decision / technical draw
NC	No contest	TKO	Technical knockout
PTS	Points decision	UD	Unanimous decision / unanimous draw

Boxing record
No.	Result	Record	Opponent	Type	Round(s)	Time	Date	Location	Notes
9	Loss	8–1	Takashi Uchiyama	KO	2 (12)	1:15	6 May 2015	Ota City General Gymnasium, Japan	For the WBA World Super Featherweight title
8	Win	8–0	Daiki Kaneko	UD	12 (12)		17 Jan 2015	Korakuen Hall, Japan	Retained OPBF Super Featherweight title
7	Win	7–0	Koseki Nakama	UD	12 (12)		24 Aug 2014	Okinawa Convention Center, Japan	Retained OPBF Super Featherweight title
6	Win	6–0	Mike Tumbaga	UD	8 (8)		31 Mar 2013	Rangsit Stadium, Rangsit, Thailand	
5	Win	5–0	Ronald Pontillas	UD	12 (12)		08 Feb 2013	Amnuaysil Association, Prachachuen, Thailand	Retained OPBF Super Featherweight title
4	Win	4–0	Ranel Suco	UD	12 (12)		24 Nov 2012	Kunming City Stadium, Kunming, China	Retained OPBF and won WBC Asian Boxing Council Continental Super Featherweight titles
3	Win	3–0	Dong Hyuk Kim	UD	9 (12)	0:54	28 May 2012	KBS Sports World, Seoul, South Korea	Won OPBF Super Featherweight title
2	Win	2–0	Yuya Sugizaki	TKO	3 (6)		23 Feb 2011	Korakuen Hall, Tokyo, Japan	
1	Win	1–0	Chartthai Chumpairtour	KO	1 (6)		07 Mar 2010	Rajadamnern Stadium, Bangkok, Thailand	

== Muay Thai & kickboxing record ==
Muay Thai record
211 wins, 48 losses, 4 draws
Date	Result	Opponent	Event	Location	Method	Round	Time
2025-02-09	Loss	(Netherlands) Darryl Verdonk	K-1 World MAX 2025	Tokyo, Japan	KO (spinning backfist)	1	1:04
2024-10-26	Loss	(China) Zhou Jiaqiang	Wu Lin Feng 549	Tangshan, China	Decision	3	3:00
2024-08-31	Loss	(China) Han Wenbao	Wu Lin Feng 547 - MAX Qualifying Tournament, Final	Tangshan, China	Decision (unanimous)	3	3:00
2024-08-31	Win	(China) Meng Lingkuo	Wu Lin Feng 547 - MAX Qualifying Tournament, Semifinal	Tangshan, China	KO (low kicks)	1	
2024-06-29	Win	(Iran) Hossein Zadeh	Kunlun Fight 100	Tongling, China	Decision (unanimous)	3	3:00
2024-04-13	Loss	(Spain) Marc Dass Rey	Rajadamnern World Series	Bangkok, Thailand	Decision (unanimous)	3	3:00
2023-12-09	Loss	(Japan) Riki Matsuoka	K-1 ReBIRTH 2	Osaka, Japan	Decision (unanimous)	3	3:00
2023-07-17	Win	(Ghana) Ayinta Ali	K-1 World GP 2023	Tokyo, Japan	Decision (unanimous)	3	3:00
2023-03-12	Loss	(Japan) Hiromi Wajima	K-1 World GP 2023: K'Festa 6	Tokyo, Japan	TKO (corner stoppage/low kicks)	4	0:25
For the K-1 Super Welterweight (154 lbs) title.
2022-12-03	Win	(Japan) Naoki Morita	K-1 World GP 2022 in Osaka	Osaka, Japan	KO (left straight)	2	0:22
2022-09-11	Win	(Nepal) Abiral Ghimire	K-1 World GP 2022 Yokohamatsuri	Yokohama, Japan	KO (high kick)	1	3:02
2020-01-05	Win	(Thailand) Petchnarin Kluarae1T	Rajadamnern Stadium	Bangkok, Thailand	KO	3	
Wins the Rajadamnern Welterweight (147 lbs) title.
2019-10-16	Loss	(Thailand) Saenpon PetchpacharaAcademy	Rajadamnern Stadium	Bangkok, Thailand	Decision	5	3:00
2019-09-19	Loss	(Thailand) Saenpon PetchpacharaAcademy	Rajadamnern Stadium	Bangkok, Thailand	Decision	5	3:00
2019-08-18	Win	(Japan) Hinata	K.O CLIMAX 2019 SUMMER KICK FEVER	Tokyo, Japan	Decision	3	3:00
2019-06-27	Win	(Brazil) Felipe Lobo	Rajadamnern Stadium	Bangkok, Thailand	Decision	5	3:00
2019-05-16	Win	(Thailand) Sakmongkol Sor.Sommai	Rajadamnern Stadium	Bangkok, Thailand	KO	3	
2019-01-19	Loss	(Thailand) Petchtanong Banchamek	Wu Lin Feng 2019: WLF World Cup 2018-2019 Final, Final	Haikou, China	Decision (unanimous)	3	3:00
2019-01-19	Win	(Netherlands) Hasan Toy	Wu Lin Feng 2019: WLF World Cup 2018-2019 Final, Semi Finals	Haikou, China	Decision (unanimous)	3	3:00
2018-11-03	Win	(China) Meng Qinghao	Wu Lin Feng 2018: WLF -67kg World Cup 2018-2019 5th Round	China	Decision	3	3:00
2018-09-01	Loss	(Russia) Aleksei Ulianov	Wu Lin Feng 2018: WLF -67kg World Cup 2018-2019 3rd Round	Zhengzhou, China	Decision	3	3:00
2018-07-07	Win	(China) Wang Pengfei	Wu Lin Feng 2018: WLF -67kg World Cup 2018-2019 1st Round	Zhengzhou, China	Decision (unanimous)	3	3:00
2018-04-28	Loss	(France) Yohann Drai	All Star Fight 3	Bangkok, Thailand	Decision	3	3:00
2018-04-01	Win	(Belarus) Dzianis Zuev	Kunlun Fight 71	Qingdao, China	Decision	3	3:00
2017-08-27	Loss	(Armenia) Marat Grigorian	Kunlun Fight 65 - World MAX 2017 Final 16	Qingdao, China	KO (right cross)	2	2:56
2017-07-15	Win	(Japan) T-98	Kunlun Fight 64 Group O Tournament Final	Chongqing, China	TKO (left low kick)	2	
Qualified to Kunlun Fight 20167 70kg Tournament Final 16.
2017-07-15	Win	(Suriname) Cedric Manhoef	Kunlun Fight 64 Group O Tournament Semi-Finals	Chongqing, China	Ex.R decision (unanimous)	4	3:00
2017-06-10	Win	(Peru) Gabriel Mazzetti	Kunlun Fight 62	Bangkok, Thailand	Decision (unanimous)	3	3:00
2017-04-23	Loss	(Russia) Artem Pashporin	Kunlun Fight 60 Group G Tournament Final	Guizhou, China	Decision	3	3:00
2017-04-23	Win	(China) Li Zhuangzhuang	Kunlun Fight 60 Group G Tournament Semi-Finals	Guizhou, China	KO (left cross)	1	2:33
2017-03-18	Loss	(Morocco) Mohamed Khamal	Enfusion Live 47	Nijmegen, Netherlands	Decision	3	3:00
2017-01-01	Loss	(Thailand) Superbon Banchamek	Kunlun Fight 56 - World MAX 2016, Final	Sanya, China	KO (right hook)	3	2:40
Fight was for Kunlun Fight World Max Tournament Title.
2017-01-01	Win	(Georgia (country)) Davit Kiria	Kunlun Fight 56 - World MAX 2016, Semi Finals	Sanya, China	Ext. R decision	4	3:00
2016-09-24	Win	(China) Tian Xin	Kunlun Fight 53 - World MAX 2016 Final 8	Beijing, China	Decision (unanimous)	3	3:00
Qualified to Kunlun Fight 2016 70kg World MAX Tournament Final 4.
2016-08-20	Win	(South Korea) Lee Sung-Hyun	Kunlun Fight 50 – World MAX 2016 Final 16	Jinan, China	Decision (unanimous)	3	3:00
Qualified to Kunlun Fight 2016 70kg World MAX Tournament Final 8.
2016-06-05	Win	(China) Gu Hui	Kunlun Fight 45 - World MAX 2016 Group M Tournament Final	Chengdu, China	Decision (unanimous)	3	3:00
Qualified to Kunlun Fight 2016 70kg Tournament Final 16.
2016-06-05	Win	(South Africa) Warren Stevelmans	Kunlun Fight 45 - World MAX 2016 Group M Tournament Semi Finals	Chengdu, China	Decision (unanimous)	3	3:00
2016-04-02	Loss	(China) Qiu Jianliang	Glory of heroes 1	Shenzhen, China	Ext. R decision	4	3:00
2016-03-06	Win	(Albania) Eduart Paci	Super Muay Thai	Bangkok, Thailand	Decision (unanimous)	3	3:00
2016-01-23	Win	(China) Deng Zeqi	Wu Lin Feng 2016: World Kickboxing Championship in Shanghai	Shanghai, China	KO (left cross)	1	
2015-12-05	Win	(Ukraine) Sergey Kulyaba	Super Muay Thai	Bangkok, Thailand	Decision (unanimous)	3	3:00
2015-08-22	Win	(China) Xie Lei	Wu Lin Feng	Xiamen, China	Decision	3	3:00
2015-07-04	Loss	(China) Yang Zhuo	Wu Lin Feng 2015 World 67 kg Tournament, Semi Final	Zhengzhou, China	Ext. R decision (split)	4	3:00
2015-03-07	Win	(China) Qiu Jianliang	Wu Lin Feng 2015 World 67 kg Tournament, Quarter Final	Zhengzhou, China	Decision	3	3:00
Wins WLF World 67kg -Part 1 4MAN-Tournament
2015-03-07	Win	(China) Guo Dongwang	Wu Lin Feng 2015 World 67 kg Tournament Final 16	Zhengzhou, China	Decision (unanimous)	3	3:00
2015-02-12	Win	(Thailand) Denpanom Rongriankilarkorat	Rajadamnern Stadium	Bangkok, Thailand	TKO	4	
2014-12-07	Win	(Thailand) Jinreedtong Seattansferry	MAX Muay Thai	Bangkok, Thailand	Decision	3	3:00
Wins MAX Muay Thai 4MAN-Tournament (67kg/147lbs)
2014-12-07	Win	(Brazil) Adaylton Freitas	MAX Muay Thai	Bangkok, Thailand	Decision	3	3:00
2014-08-03	Win	(Russia) Khayal Dzhaniev	Max Muay Thai	Thailand	KO	2	
2014-06-08	Win	(England) Kamen Picken	Max Muay Thai	Thailand	KO (elbow)	1	
2014-03-29	Win	(Australia) Mike '300' Demetriou	MAX Muay Thai 7	Bangkok, Thailand	TKO (referee stoppage)	2	
Wins MAX Muay Thai 4MAN-Tournament (67kg/147lbs)
2014-03-29	Win	(Uzbekistan) Naimjon Tuhtaboyev	MAX Muay Thai 7	Bangkok, Thailand	Decision	3	3:00
2014-02-16	Win	(China) Tie Yinghua	MAX Muay Thai 6	Zhengzhou, China	Decision (unanimous)	3	3:00
2013-11-06	Loss	(Thailand) Pakorn PKSaenchaimuaythaigym	Rajadamnern Stadium	Bangkok, Thailand	Decision	5	3:00
2013-08-10	Win	(China) Deng Zeqi	Max Muay Thai 3	Zhengzhou, China	KO (knee)	1	
2012-10-11	Win	(Thailand) Parnphet Chor.Na Patalung	Onesongchai, Rajadamnern Stadium	Bangkok, Thailand	Decision	5	3:00
2012-08-07	Win	(Thailand) Thongchai Sitsongpeenong	Fairtex, Lumpinee Stadium	Bangkok, Thailand	TKO (referee stoppage)	3	
2012-06-09	Win	(Turkey) Yetkin Ozkul	WBC Battle of the belts	Bangkok, Thailand	Decision	5	3:00
Retains WBC Muay Thai World Lightweight title (135 lbs/61.235 kg).
2012-03-12	Loss	(Thailand) Petchboonchu FA Group	Rajadamnern Stadium	Bangkok, Thailand	Decision	5	3:00
2012-01-26	Win	(Thailand) Singtongnoi Por.Telakun	Onesongchai, Rajadamnern Stadium	Bangkok, Thailand	Decision	5	3:00
2011-12-22	Loss	(Thailand) Kongsak sitboonmee	Rajadamnern Stadium	Bangkok, Thailand	Decision	5	3:00
2011-11-04	Win	(Japan) Hiromasa Masuda	WBC Muaythai Gala	Bangkok, Thailand	TKO (referee stoppage)	2	1:22
Wins Vacant WBC Muay Thai World Lightweight title (135 lbs/61.235 kg).
2011-10-03	Win	(Japan) Tetsuya Yamato	WBC Japan, Korakuen Hall	Tokyo, Japan	Decision (unanimous)	5	3:00
2011-08-18	Loss	(Thailand) Pakon Sakyothin	Onesongchai, Rajadamnern Stadium	Bangkok, Thailand	Decision	5	3:00
2011-07-13	Win	(Thailand) Phet-Ek Kiatyongyut	Daorungchujaroen, Rajadamnern Stadium	Bangkok, Thailand	Decision	5	3:00
2011-06-11	Win	(China) Zhang Junyong	Wushu vs Muaythai	China	KO (left low kick)	3	
2011-05-26	Win	(Thailand) Nong-O Kaiyanghadaogym	Rajadamnern Stadium	Bangkok, Thailand	Decision	5	3:00
Defends the WBC Muay Thai World Featherweight (126 lbs) title.
2011-05-05	Win	(Thailand) Nong-O Kaiyanghadaogym	Daorungchujaroen, Rajadamnern Stadium	Bangkok, Thailand	Decision	5	3:00
2011-03-31	Win	(Thailand) Nong-O Sit Or	Rajadamnern - Lumpinee For Tsunami Japan	Bangkok, Thailand	Decision	5	3:00
2011-01-31	Win	(Thailand) Tukkatathong Phetphayathai	Daorungchujaroen, Rajadamnern Stadium	Bangkok, Thailand	Decision	5	3:00
Defends the Rajadamnern Super Featherweight (130 lbs) title.
2011-01-06	Win	(Thailand) Jaroenchai Aooddonmuang	Daorungchujaroen, Rajadamnern Stadium	Bangkok, Thailand	Decision	5	3:00
2010-12-18	Win	(China) Li Teng	Bruce Lee 70th Birthday Celebrations	Shun De, China	KO (knee strike)	3	
2010-11-02	Loss	(Thailand) Pakon Sakyothin	Suek Lumpinee-Rajadamnern Special, Lumpinee Stadium	Bangkok, Thailand	Decision	5	3:00
2010-10-07	Win	(Thailand) Kongnakornban Sor. Kitrungrot	Daorungchujaroen, Rajadamnern Stadium	Bangkok, Thailand	Decision	5	3:00
Wins the vacant Rajadamnern Super Featherweight (130 lbs) title.
2010-09-07	Loss	(Thailand) Singtongnoi Por.Telakun	Petsupapan, Lumpinee Stadium	Bangkok, Thailand	Decision	5	3:00
2010-06-10	Loss	(Thailand) Singtongnoi Por.Telakun	Onesongchai, Rajadamnern Stadium	Bangkok, Thailand	Decision	5	3:00
2010-05-07	Win	(Thailand) Mongkolchai Kwaitonggym	Petchpiya, Lumpinee Stadium	Bangkok, Thailand	KO (punch)	4	
2010-02-11	Loss	(Thailand) Singtongnoi Por.Telakun	Petthongkam, Rajadamnern Stadium	Bangkok, Thailand	Decision	5	3:00
2009-12-23	Win	(Thailand) Sittisak Petpayathai	Sor.Sommai, Rajadamnern Stadium	Bangkok, Thailand	KO (left uppercut)	2	
2009-11-28	Win	(France) Albert Veera Chey	A1 Lyon	Lyon, France	Decision	5	3:00
Defends the WBC Muay Thai World Featherweight (126 lbs) title.
2009-10-01	Win	(Thailand) Sittisak Petpayathai	Daorungchujaroen, Rajadamnern Stadium	Bangkok, Thailand	Decision	5	3:00
Wins the vacant Rajadamnern Featherweight (126 lbs) title.
2009-08-06	Loss	(Thailand) Nong-O Sit Or	Ratchadamnern vs Lumpini, Rajadamnern Stadium	Bangkok, Thailand	Decision	5	3:00
2009-06-21	Win	(Thailand) Kaew Fairtex	M-1 Fairtex Muay Thai Challenge	Differ Ariake, Japan	Decision	5	3:00
2009-06-01	Win	(Thailand) Sagetdao Phetphayathai	Daorungchujaroen, Rajadamnern Stadium	Bangkok, Thailand	Decision	5	3:00
2009-04-30	Win	(Thailand) Fahmai Skindewgym	Daorungchujaroen, Rajadamnern Stadium	Bangkok, Thailand	Decision	5	3:00
2009-03-06	Loss	(Thailand) Petchboonchu FA Group	Lumpini Champion Krikkrai, Lumpinee Stadium	Bangkok, Thailand	Decision	5	3:00
2009-01-18	Win	(Japan) Atom Yamada	WBC Muaythai Event	Beijing, China	Decision	5	3:00
2008-12-22	Win	(Thailand) Phetasawin Seatranferry	Rajadamnern Stadium	Bangkok, Thailand	KO (liver shot)	3	
2008-11-13	Win	(Thailand) Sagetdao Phetphayathai	Jarumueang, Rajadamnern Stadium	Bangkok, Thailand	Decision	5	3:00
2008-10-02	Draw	(Thailand) Petto Sitjaophor	Daorungchujaroen, Rajadamnern Stadium	Bangkok, Thailand	Decision draw	5	3:00
2008-08-22	Win	(Thailand) Sagetdao Phetphayathai	Eminent Air, Lumpinee Stadium	Bangkok, Thailand	Decision	5	3:00
2008-07-31	Win	(Thailand) Anuwat Kaewsamrit	Daorungchujarern, Rajadamnern Stadium	Bangkok, Thailand	Decision (unanimous)	5	3:00
Wins WBC Muay Thai World Featherweight title (57.153 kg).
2008-07-01	Win	(Thailand) Tuktatong Chengsimiewgym	Suek Saengmorakot, Lumpinee Stadium	Bangkok, Thailand	Decision (3–2)	5	3:00
2008-06-02	Win	(Thailand) Chok Eminentair	Daorungchujarern, Rajadamnern Stadium	Bangkok, Thailand	Decision	5	3:00
2008-04-28	Win	(Thailand) Sagetdao Phetphayathai	Daorungchujarern, Rajadamnern Stadium	Bangkok, Thailand	Decision	5	3:00
2008-03-04	Loss	(Thailand) Sagetdao Phetphayathai	Kiatphet, Lumpinee Stadium	Bangkok, Thailand	Decision	5	3:00
2008-01-31	Win	(Thailand) Samsamut Kiatchongkhao	Jarumueang, Rajadamnern Stadium	Bangkok, Thailand	TKO	2	
2007-12-20	Loss	(Thailand) Chalermdet Sor.Tawanrung	Daorungchujarern, Rajadamnern Stadium	Bangkok, Thailand	Decision	5	3:00
2007-11-29	Loss	(Thailand) Loh-ngern Pitakkruchaidan	Kai Yang Ha Dao Tournament, Quarterfinals	Thailand	Decision	3	3:00
2007-10-11	Loss	(Thailand) Saenchai Sor Kingstar	Lumpinee Stadium	Bangkok, Thailand	Decision (unanimous)	5	3:00
2007-08-02	Win	(Thailand) Jaroenchai Kesagym	Rajadamnern Stadium	Bangkok, Thailand	Decision	5	3:00
2007-06-21	Win	(Thailand) Lerdsila Chumpairtour	Rajadamnern Stadium	Bangkok, Thailand	Decision	5	3:00
2007-05-22	Loss	(Thailand) Singdam Kiatmoo9	Wanboonya, Lumpinee Stadium	Bangkok, Thailand	Decision	5	3:00
2007-03-29	Win	(Thailand) Ronnachai Naratreekul	Rajadamnern Stadium	Bangkok, Thailand	Decision	5	3:00
2007-02-14	Loss	(Thailand) Orono Tawan	Sor.Sommai, Rajadamnern Stadium	Bangkok, Thailand	Decision	5	3:00
2007-01-18	Win	(Thailand) Nongbee Kiatyongyut	Kiatyongyut, Rajadamnern Stadium	Bangkok, Thailand	Decision	5	3:00
2006-12-21	Draw	(Thailand) Anuwat Kaewsamrit	Birthday Show, Rajadamnern Stadium	Bangkok, Thailand	Decision draw	5	3:00
2006-11-16	Win	(Thailand) Anuwat Kaewsamrit	Rajadamnern Stadium	Bangkok, Thailand	Decision	5	3:00
Wins the vacant Rajadamnern Featherweight (126 lbs) title.
2006-10-05	Win	(Thailand) Lerdsila Chumpairtour	Daorungchujaroen, Rajadamnern Stadium	Bangkok, Thailand	Decision	5	3:00
2006-09-04	Win	(Thailand) Ronnachai Naratreekul	Daorungchujaroen, Rajadamnern Stadium	Bangkok, Thailand	Decision	5	3:00
Wins the WMC World Featherweight (126 lbs) title.
2006-08-11	Win	(Thailand) Yuthajak Kaewsamrit	Sor Phumpanmoung, Lumpinee Stadium	Bangkok, Thailand	TKO	4	
2006-07-05	Loss	(Thailand) Saenchainoi Nongkeesuwit	Onesongchai, Rajadamnern Stadium	Bangkok, Thailand	Decision	5	3:00
2006-05-18	Draw	(Thailand) Lerdsila Chumpairtour	Daorungchujarean, Rajadamnern Stadium	Bangkok, Thailand	Decision draw	5	3:00
2006-04-11	Win	(Thailand) Sarawut Lukbanyai	Phetburapha, Lumpinee Stadium	Bangkok, Thailand	Decision	5	3:00
2006-03-06	Win	(Thailand) Singtongnoi Por.Telakun	Onesongchai, Rajadamnern Stadium	Bangkok, Thailand	Decision	5	3:00
2006-01-25	Win	(Thailand) Phetek Kiatyongyut	Daorungchujarean, Rajadamnern Stadium	Bangkok, Thailand	Decision	5	3:00
2005-12-19	Win	(Thailand) Lerdsila Chumpairtour	Daorungchujarean, Rajadamnern Stadium	Bangkok, Thailand	Decision	5	3:00
2005-11-02	Loss	(Thailand) Ronnachai Naratreekul	Daorungchujarean, Rajadamnern Stadium	Bangkok, Thailand	Decision	5	3:00
2005-09-19	Win	(Thailand) Sayannoi Kiatprapat	Daorungchujarean, Rajadamnern Stadium	Bangkok, Thailand	Decision	5	3:00
2005-08-04	Win	(Thailand) Singtongnoi Por.Telakun	Daorungchujarean, Rajadamnern Stadium	Bangkok, Thailand	Decision	5	3:00
2005-06-30	Loss	(Thailand) Seanchainoi Seandeatgym	Jarumuang, Rajadamnern Stadium	Bangkok, Thailand	Decision	5	3:00
2005-05-30	Win	(Thailand) Watcharachai Kaewsamrit	Daorungchujarean, Rajadamnern Stadium	Bangkok, Thailand	Decision	5	3:00
2005-04-27	Win	(Thailand) Saengathit Sasiprapa Gym	Daorungchujarean, Rajadamnern Stadium	Bangkok, Thailand	Decision	5	3:00
2005-03-30	Win	(Thailand) Seanchai Jirakrengkri	Jarumueang, Rajadamnern Stadium	Bangkok, Thailand	Decision	5	3:00
2005-03-03	Loss	(Thailand) Chalermkiat Kiatpakin	Daorungchujarean, Rajadamnern Stadium	Bangkok, Thailand	Decision	5	3:00
2005-01-26	Loss	(Thailand) Saengathit Sasiprapa Gym	Daorungchujaroen, Rajadamnern Stadium	Bangkok, Thailand	Decision	5	3:00
2004-12-23	Loss	(Thailand) Singpayak Khetrangsii	Daorungchujarean, Rajadamnern Stadium	Bangkok, Thailand	Decision	5	3:00
2004-11-29	Win	(Thailand) Seangartid Sasiprapagym	Daorungchujarean, Rajadamnern Stadium	Bangkok, Thailand	Decision	5	3:00
2004-11-06	Win	(Japan) Gohsuke Kikuchi	Titans 1st	Kitakyushu, Japan	Decision (unanimous)	3	3:00
2004-09-30	Win	(Thailand) Deatsak Sor.Thumpet	Daorungchujarean, Rajadamnern Stadium	Bangkok, Thailand	Decision	5	3:00
Wins the Rajadamnern Bantamweight (118 lbs) title.
2004-09-06	Win	(Thailand) Saengathit Sasiprapa Gym	Daorungchujarean, Rajadamnern Stadium	Bangkok, Thailand	Decision	5	3:00
2004-07-29	Win	(Thailand) Berkreak Pinsinchai	Jarumueang, Rajadamnern Stadium	Bangkok, Thailand	Decision	5	3:00
2004-04-29	Win	(Thailand) Petcheak Sor.Tarntawan	Daorungchujarean, Rajadamnern Stadium	Bangkok, Thailand	Decision	5	3:00
2004-04-01	Draw	(Thailand) Paenyai Sitkaewprapon	Daorungchujarean, Rajadamnern Stadium	Bangkok, Thailand	Decision draw	5	3:00
2004-03-03	Win	(Thailand) Tewarit Mueangsurin	Jarumueang, Rajadamnern Stadium	Bangkok, Thailand	Decision	5	3:00

== See also ==
- List of male kickboxers
