= 2025 in K-1 =

Mixed martial arts events

Information
- First date: February 9, 2025
- Last date: November 29, 2025

Events
- Total events: 8

The year 2025 is the 32nd year in the history of the K-1, a global kickboxing promotion. The year started with K-1 World MAX 2025.

== List of events ==
#	Event title	Date	Arena	Location
1	K-1 World MAX 2025	February 9, 2025	Yoyogi 2nd Gymnasium	Tokyo, Japan
2	K-1 Beyond	May 31, 2025	Yokohama Buntai	Yokohama, Japan
3	K-1 World MAX 2025 - South American Round	June 28, 2025	Ginásio Max Rosenmann	São José dos Pinhais, Brazil
4	K-1 Dontaku	July 13, 2025	Marine Messe Fukuoka Hall B	Fukuoka, Japan
5	K-1 World MAX 2025 - 70kg World Tournament Opening Round	September 7, 2025	Yoyogi 2nd Gymnasium	Tokyo, Japan
6	K-1 World GP 2025 -90kg in Brasília	October 4, 2025	Shopping Conjunto Nacional	Brasília, Brazil
7	K-1 World MAX 2025 - 70kg World Championship Tournament Final	November 15, 2025	Yoyogi National Gymnasium	Tokyo, Japan
8	K-1 World MAX Europe - Oktagon Roma	November 29, 2025	PalaPellicone Ostia	Rome, Italy

== K-1 World MAX 2025 ==
K-1 World MAX 2025
- Promotion: K-1
- Date: February 9, 2025
- Venue: Yoyogi 2nd Gymnasium
- City: Tokyo, Japan
- Attendance: 3,500

K-1 World MAX 2025 was a kickboxing event held by K-1 on February 9, 2025, at the Yoyogi 2nd Gymnasium in Tokyo, Japan.

=== Background ===
A K-1 Featherweight title bout between champion Takumi Terada and challenger Takahito Niimi, a K-1 Super Bantamweight title bout between champion Akihiro Kaneko and challenger Manolis Kallistis, as well as a K-1 Women's Atomweight Grand Prix were all scheduled to take place during the event.

=== 2025 K-1 Atomweight Championship Tournament bracket ===
Semi-finals
(Japan) Kira Matsutani	UD
(Thailand) Mafia Petchmongkoldee	3
(Australia) Lucille Deadman	3
(Japan) Aki Suematsu	UD

Final
(Japan) Aki Suematsu	3
(Japan) Kira Matsutani	MD

=== Fight Card ===
K-1 World MAX 2025
Weight Class				Method	Round	Time	Notes
Super Bantamweight 55 kg	(Japan) Akihiro Kaneko (c)	def.	(Greece) Manolis Kallistis	Decision (Unanimous)	3	3:00	for the K-1 Super Bantamweight Championship
Suepr Lightweight 65 kg	(Thailand) Yodkhunpon Weerasakreck (c)	def.	(Japan) Hayato Suzuki	TKO (Punches)	1	1:26	for the K-1 Super Lightweight Championship
Featherweight 57.5 kg	(Japan) Takumi Terada (c)	def.	(Japan) Takahito Niimi	Decision (Unanimous)	3	3:00	for the K-1 Featherweight Championship
catchweight 77 kg	(Japan) Shintaro Matsukura	def.	(South Korea) Park Chung Il	TKO (low kicks)	2	1:21	
Cruiserweight 90 kg	(Netherlands) Thian De Vries	def.	(Brazil) Carlos Budiao	KO (Left cross)	1	2:31	
Super Welterweight 70 kg	(Netherlands) Darryl Verdonk	def.	(Thailand) Jomthong StrikerGym	KO (Spinning back fist)	1	1:04	
Super Welterweight 70 kg	(Japan) Riku	def.	(Morocco) Mohammed Boutasaa	Decision (Majority)	3	3:00	
Super Welterweight 70 kg	(Brazil) Dengue Silva	def.	(Japan) Jinku Oda	Decision (Majority)	3	3:00	
Super Welterweight 70 kg	(Nepal) Abiral Himalayan Cheetah	def.	(Japan) Yasuhito Shirasu	TKO (Corner stoppage)	3	1:13	
Catchweight 58 kg	(Japan) Rui Okubo	def.	(Japan) Koshiro Takemi	KO (Body kick)	3	1:31	
Intermission
Atomweight 45 kg	(Japan) Kira Matsutani	def.	(Japan) Aki Suematsu	Decision (Majority)	3	3:00	K-1 Women's Atomweight Championship Tournament Final
Super Lightweight 65 kg	(Japan) Shu Inagaki	def.	(Japan) Daizo Sasaki	Decision (Unanimous)	3	3:00	
Suepr Lightweight 65 kg	(Japan) Kensei Kondo	def.	(Russia) Viktor Akimov	TKO (3 Knockdowns)	1	2:19	
Lightweight 62.5 kg	(Japan) Yuzuki Satomi	def.	(Argentina) Tomás Aguirre	Decision (Unanimous)	3	3:00	
Featherweight 57.5 kg	(Japan) Shoki Kaneda	def.	(Japan) Shuhei Kumura	KO (Left cross)	1	2:57	
Featherweight 57.5 kg	(Japan) Ryota Ishida	def.	(Japan) Lyra Nagasaka	Decision (Unanimous)	3	3:00	
Women's Flyweight 52 kg	(Japan) Noriko Ikeuchi	def.	(Greece) Vesela Rogaska	Decision (Unanimous)	3	3:00	
Atomweight 45 kg	(Japan) Kira Matsutani	def.	(Thailand) Mafia Petchmongkoldee	Decision (Unanimous)	3	3:00	K-1 Women's Atomweight Championship Tournament Semifinal
Atomweight 45 kg	(Japan) Aki Suematsu	def.	(Australia) Lucille Deadman	Decision (Unanimous)	3	3:00	K-1 Women's Atomweight Championship Tournament Semifinal
Atomweight 45 kg	(Japan) Hiyori Onishi	def.	(South Korea) Yang Yujung	Decision (Unanimous)	3	3!00	K-1 Women's Atomweight Championship Tournament reserve
Preliminary Card
Lightweight 62.5 kg	(Japan) Hiroki Nakano	def.	(Japan) Akihiro Kawagoe	Decision (Unanimous)	3	3!00	
Super Bantamweight 55 kg	(Japan) Haruto	def.	(Japan) Ryuki	Decision (Unanimous)	3	3:00	
Super Bantamweight 55 kg	(Japan) Daichi	def.	(Japan) Ryuto Uchida	Decision (Unanimous)	3	3:00	
Super Lightweight 65 kg	(Japan) Hayato Hamana	def.	(Japan) Masato Ishikawa	KO (Punches)	3	3:00	
Catchweight 51 kg	(Japan) Seri Okubo	def.	(Japan) Ryuki	Decision (Unanimous)	3	3!00	

== K-1 Beyond ==
K-1 Beyond
- Promotion: K-1
- Date: May 31, 2025
- Venue: Yokohama Buntai
- City: Yokohama, Japan
- Attendance: 4,000

K-1 Beyond was a kickboxing event produced by K-1 held on May 31, 2025, at Yokohama Buntai in Yokohama, Japan.

=== Background ===
The 2025 K-1 Super Featherweight Grand Prix, organized to crown the new K-1 Super Featherweight champion, was held during the event.

A K-1 Cruiserweight Championship bout between champion Liu Ce and challenger Thian de Vries was scheduled to take place during the event, as well as a K-1 Super Welterweight Championship bout between champion Ouyang Feng and challenger Darryl Verdonk. Yodkhunpon missed weight by 100g and was stripped of the title on the scale.

=== 2025 K-1 Super Featherweight Championship Tournament bracket ===
Quarter-finals
(Japan) Tomoya Yokoyama	KO
(Russia) Egor Bikrev	4
(China) Huang Shuailu	UD
(Netherlands) Matthew Daalman	4
(Japan) Chihiro Nakajima	UD
(Spain) Ali Laamari	3
(Japan) Yuta Matsuyama	1
(France) Rémi Parra	KO

Semi-finals
(Japan) Tomoya Yokoyama	KO
(Netherlands) Matthew Daalman ^{1}	1
(Japan) Chihiro Nakajima	2
(France) Rémi Parra	TKO

Final
(Japan) Tomoya Yokoyama	2
(France) Rémi Parra	TKO

^{1} Huang Shuailu had to withdraw from the semifinals due to a jaw injury and was subsequently replaced by Matthew Daalman as reservist Leona Pettas was also injured.

=== Fight Card ===
K-1 Beyond
Weight Class				Method	Round	Time	Notes
Cruiserweight 90 kg	(Netherlands) Thian de Vries	def.	(Iran) Mahmoud Sattari	KO (left cross)	1	1:04	For the vacant K-1 Cruiserweight Championship
Super Welterweight 70 kg	(China) Ouyang Feng (c)	def.	(Netherlands) Darryl Verdonk	Decision (unanimous)	3	3:00	For the K-1 Super Welterweight Championship
Super Lightweight 65 kg	(Thailand) Yodkhunpon Weerasakreck	def.	(Japan) Shu Inagaki	KO (left hook)	2	1:26	For the vacant K-1 Super Lightweight Championship. Yodkhunpon missed weight and was stripped of the title, only Inagaki eligible to win it.
Super Featherweight 60 kg	(France) Rémi Parra	def.	(Japan) Tomoya Yokoyama	TKO (3 knockdowns)	2	1:10	K-1 Super Featherweight Championship Tournament Final
Catchweight 56 kg	(Japan) Koji Ikeda	def.	(Japan) Akihiro Kaneko	Decision (majority)	3	3:00	
Exhibition	(Japan) Rui Okubo	vs.	(Japan) Issei Ishii				
Super Featherweight 60 kg	(France) Rémi Parra	def.	(Japan) Chihiro Nakajima	TKO (2 knockdowns)	2	1:52	Super Featherweight Championship Tournament Semifinals
Super Featherweight 60 kg	(Japan) Tomoya Yokoyama	def.	(Netherlands) Matthew Daalaman	TKO (2 knockdowns)	1	1:04	Super Featherweight Championship Tournament Semifinals
Super Lightweight 65 kg	(Japan) Daizo Sasaki	def.	(Japan) Kensei Kondo	Ext.R Decision (unanimous)	4	3:00	
Lightweight 62.5 kg	(Japan) Yuzuki Satomi	def.	(Russia) Suliman Beterbiev	KO (left cross)	1	0:28	
Catchweight 61 kg	(Japan) Yuta Murakoshi	def.	(Japan) Yuto Saito	Ext.R Decision (split)	4	3:00	
Super Featherweight 60 kg	(France) Rémi Parra	def.	(Japan) Yuta Matsuyama	KO (left cross)	1	1:45	Super Featherweight Championship Tournament Quarterfinals
Super Featherweight 60 kg	(Japan) Chihiro Nakajima	def.	(Spain) Ali Laamari	Decision (unanimous)	3	3:00	Super Featherweight Championship Tournament Quarterfinals
Super Featherweight 60 kg	(China) Huang Shuailu	def.	(Netherlands) Matthew Daalman	Ext.R Decision (unanimous)	4	3:00	Super Featherweight Championship Tournament Quarterfinals
Super Featherweight 60 kg	(Japan) Tomoya Yokoyama	def.	(Russia) Egor Bikrev	KO (left hook to the body)	4	2:01	Super Featherweight Championship Tournament Quarterfinals
Super Featherweight 60 kg	(Japan) Leona Pettas	def.	(Japan) Sota Amano	KO (right cross)	1	2:16	Super Featherweight Championship Tournament Reserve; Amano missed weight by 2kg, he received a two-point deduction and became ineligible as a reservist.
Preliminary Card
Catchweight 51 kg	(Japan) Seri Okubo	def.	(Japan) Minagi	Decision (majority)	3	3:00	
Featherweight 57.5 kg	(Japan) Riku Watanabe	def.	(Japan) Kei Ishikawa	Decision (majority)	3	3:00	
Featherweight 57.5 kg	(Japan) Hayato Onodera	def.	(Japan) Yasu Jota	Decision (unanimous)	3	3:00	
Super Bantamweight 55 kg	(Japan) Takumi Shima	draw.	(Japan) Ryuto Uchida	Decision (majority)	3	3:00	
Super Lightweight 65 kg	(Japan) Masato Ishikawa	def.	(Japan) Shunta Hamazaki	Decision (unanimous)	3	3:00	

== K-1 World MAX 2025 - South American Round ==
K-1 World MAX 2025 - South American Round
- Promotion: K-1; WGP
- Date: June 28, 2025
- Venue: Ginásio Max Rosenmann
- City: São José dos Pinhais, Brazil
- Attendance: 3,000

K-1 World MAX 2025 - South American Round is a kickboxing event that was held in co-promotion by K-1 and WGP on June 28, 2025, at Ginásio Max Rosenmann in São José dos Pinhais, Brazil.

=== Background ===
The event will feature an 8-man tournament in the 70kg division to determine the participant to the 2025 K-1 World Max Tournament in Japan. The WGP Kickboxing champion Petros Cabelinho will be one of the eight participants alongside title challengers Jones Coliseu and André Martins

=== 2025 K-1 World MAX South America Tournament bracket ===
Quarter-finals
(Brazil) Petros Cabelinho	UD
(Argentina) Mitralleta Torino	3
(Brazil) André Martins	SD
(Brazil) Garbiel De Lima	3
(Brazil) Jones Coliseu	MD
(Brazil) Heliazir Estefani	4
(Brazil) Marcio De Jesus	3
(Brazil) Jonas Salsicha	UD

Semi-finals
(Brazil) Petros Cabelinho	3
(Brazil) André Martins	SD
(Brazil) Jones Coliseu	3
(Brazil) Jonas Salsicha	UD

Final
(Brazil) André Martins	3
(Brazil) Jonas Salsicha	UD

=== Fight Card ===
K-1 World MAX 2025 - South American Round
Weight Class				Method	Round	Time	Notes
Super Welterweight 70 kg	(Brazil) Jonas Salsicha	def.	(Brazil) André Martins	Decision (unanimous)	3	3:00	K-1 World MAX 2025 - South American Round, Final
Women's Lightweight 60 kg	(Brazil) Jennifer Maia (c)	def.	(Uruguay) Marilyn Contin	Decision (split)	5	3:00	For the WGP Women's Lightweight title
Catchweight 66 kg	(Brazil) Jordan Kranio	def.	(Argentina) Ignacio Famozo	KO (punches)	1	2:26	
Super Welterweight 70 kg	(Brazil) Jonas Salsicha	def.	(Brazil) Jones Coliseu	Decision (unanimous)	3	3:00	K-1 World MAX 2025 - South American Round, Semifinals
Super Welterweight 70 kg	(Brazil) André Martins	def.	(Brazil) Petros Cabelinho	Decision (split)	3	3:00	K-1 World MAX 2025 - South American Round, Semifinals
Super Welterweight 70 kg	(Paraguay) Ariel Villalba	def.	(Brazil) Maycon Souza	KO (Low kick)	2	2:50	K-1 World MAX 2025 - South American Round, Reserve
Super Welterweight 70 kg	(Brazil) Jonas Salsicha	def.	(Brazil) Marcio De Jesus	Decision (unanimous)	3	3:00	K-1 World MAX 2025 - South American Round, Quarterfinals
Super Welterweight 70 kg	(Brazil) Jones Coliseu	def.	(Brazil) Heliazir Estefani	Ext.R Decision (majority)	4	3:00	K-1 World MAX 2025 - South American Round, Quarterfinals
Super Welterweight 70 kg	(Brazil) André Martins	def.	(Brazil) Garbiel De Lima	Decision (split)	3	3:00	K-1 World MAX 2025 - South American Round, Quarterfinals
Super Welterweight 70 kg	(Brazil) Petros Cabelinho	def.	(Argentina) Mitralleta Torino	Decision (unanimous)	3	3:00	K-1 World MAX 2025 - South American Round, Quarterfinals
Preliminary Card
Cruiserweight 84 kg	(Brazil) Joao Victor	def.	(Uruguay) Carlos De Los Santos	Decision (unanimous)	3	3:00	
Super Lightweight 64.5 kg	(Brazil) Denis Souza Jr.	def.	(Brazil) Matheus Pinokio	Decision (unanimous)	3	3:00	
Light Middleweight 71.8 kg	(Brazil) Gustavo Bolino	def.	(Brazil) Luciano De Paula	Decision (unanimous)	3	3:00	
Super Middleweight 77 kg	(Brazil) André Dédé	def.	(Brazil) Vitor Formigão	KO (body kick)	2	0:27	
Lightweight 61 kg	(Brazil) Fernando Mineiro	def.	(Brazil) Uederson Macabro	KO (left hook)	2	2:10	
Women's Lightweight 60 kg	(Brazil) Leticia Orchell	def.	(Brazil) Dani Antonelli	Decision (unanimous)	3	3:00	

== K-1 Dontaku ==
K-1 Dontaku
- Promotion: K-1
- Date: July 13, 2025
- Venue: Marine Messe Fukuoka Hall B
- City: Fukuoka, Japan
- Attendance: 3,500

K-1 Dontaku is a kickboxing event that will be held by K-1 on July 13, 2025, at Marine Messe Fukuoka Hall B in Fukuoka, Japan.

=== Background ===
Two title fights were scheduled for the event: a K-1 Heavyweight Championship bout between Roel Mannaart and K-Jee, as well as a K-1 Women's Flyweight Championship between ☆SAHO☆ and Lara Fernandez.

=== Fight Card ===
K-1 Dontaku
Weight Class				Method	Round	Time	Notes
Heavyweight	(Netherlands) Roel Mannaart (c)	def.	(Japan) K-Jee	KO (low kicks)	2	1:32	For the K-1 Heavyweight Championship
Catchweight 73 kg	(Poland) Kacper Muszyński	def.	(China) Chen Yonghui	KO (body kick)	2	2:01	
Super Welterweight 70 kg	(Armenia) Zhora Akopyan	def.	(Japan) Riku	KO (punches)	1	2:51	
Heavyweight	(Brazil) Ariel Machado	def.	(Netherlands) Rio Richardson	TKO (3 knockdowns/low kicks)	1	1:58	
Lightweight 62.5 kg	(Japan) Hirotaka Asahisa	def.	(France) Bryan Lang	KO (body punches)	1	2:58	
Super Lightweight 65 kg	(Japan) Taio Asahisa	def.	(Belarus) Danila Kvach	Decision (majority)	3	3:00	
Intermission
Women's Flyweight 52 kg	(Japan) ☆SAHO☆ (c)	def.	(Spain) Lara Fernandez	Decision (unanimous)	3	3:00	For the K-1 Women's Flyweight Championship
Catchweight 59 kg	(Japan) Takumi Terada	def.	(Greece) Angelos Kaponis	KO (Overhand + left hook)	1	1:58	
Bantamweight 53 kg	(Japan) Issei Ishii	def.	(Japan) Yusei Shirahata	Ext.R Decision (Split)	4	3:00	
Faetherweight 57.5 kg	(Japan) Shoki Kaneda	def.	(Japan) Ginji	KO (high kick)	3	1:26	
Catchweight 58.5 kg	(Japan) Ryota Ishida	def.	(Thailand) Daosayam Wor.Wanchai	Decision (unanimous)	3	3:00	
Lightweight 62.5 kg	(Japan) Tatsuya Oiwa	def.	(Japan) Ryuya Nishimoto	KO (left hook)	3	0:50	
Catchweight 56 kg	(Japan) Rui Okubo	def.	(Japan) Shion	TKO (punches)	1	2:39	
Super Welterweight 70 kg	(Japan) Jin Hirayama	def.	(Japan) KO-TA Bravely	KO (punches)	3	3:00	
Lightweight 62.5 kg	(Japan) Ryunosuke	def.	(Japan) Shuji Kawarada	Decision (unanimous)	3	3:00	
Atomweight 45 kg	(Japan) Aki Suematsu	def.	(Japan) Hiyori Onishi	Decision (unanimous)	3	3:00	
Bantamweight 53 kg	(Japan) Kakeru Nagano	def.	(Japan) Keito Ishigo	Decision (majority)	3	3:00	
Bantamweight 53 kg	(Japan) Yuya Hayashi	def.	(Japan) Riki Soda	Decision (unanimous)	3	3:00	
Preliminary Card
Bantamweight 53 kg	(Japan) Ryu Ohira	def.	(Japan) Ritoru	KO	1		
Super Bantamweight 55 kg	(Japan) Isshi	def.	(Japan) Daichi	Decision (unanimous)	3	3:00	
Super Featherweight 60 kg	(Japan) Daito Nonaka	def.	(Japan) Musashi	Decision (unanimous)	3	3:00	
Catchweight 51 kg	(Japan) Kohaku	def.	(Japan) Yusei Yoake	KO	1	1:51	

== K-1 World MAX 2025 - 70kg World Tournament Opening Round ==
K-1 World MAX 2025 70kg World Championship Tournament Opening Round
- Promotion: K-1
- Date: September 7, 2025
- Venue: Yoyogi 2nd Gymnasium
- City: Tokyo, Japan

K-1 World MAX 2025 - 70kg World Tournament Opening Round was a kickboxing event held by K-1 on September 7, 2025, at the Yoyogi 2nd Gymnasium in Tokyo, Japan.

=== Background ===
The event will feature 16 fighters in the 70kg division competing for a spot on the 8-man tournament at the K-1 World MAX 2025 - 70kg World Championship Tournament Final Round event in November 2025.

=== Fight Card ===
K-1 World MAX 2025 - 70kg World Tournament Opening Round
Weight Class				Method	Round	Time	Notes
Super Welterweight 70 kg	(China) Ouyang Feng	def.	(Poland) Kacper Muszyński	Decision (majority)	3	3:00	K-1 World MAX 2025 Opening Round
Super Welterweight 70 kg	(Bulgaria) Stoyan Koprivlenski	def.	(Moldova) Denis Țapu	Decision (unanimous)	3	3:00	K-1 World MAX 2025 Opening Round
Super Welterweight 70 kg	(Netherlands) Darryl Verdonk	def.	(Kyrgyzstan) Nurtilek Zhalynbekov	TKO (3 knockdowns)	1	2:18	K-1 World MAX 2025 Opening Round
Super Welterweight 70 kg	(Brazil) Minoru Kimura	def.	(United States) Mason Strodtman	KO (left hook)	1	1:15	K-1 World MAX 2025 Opening Round
Super Welterweight 70 kg	(Armenia) Zhora Akopyan	def.	(Samoa) Jonathan Aiulu	Decision (unanimous)	3	3:00	K-1 World MAX 2025 Opening Round
Super Welterweight 70 kg	(France) Aymeric Lazizi	def.	(Nepal) Abiral Himalayan Cheetah	Decision (unanimous)	3	3:00	K-1 World MAX 2025 Opening Round
Super Welterweight 70 kg	(Senegal) Alfousseynou Kamara	def.	(Germany) Albijon Morina	TKO (Punches)	1	2:03	K-1 World MAX 2025 Opening Round
Super Welterweight 70 kg	(Brazil) Jonas Salsicha	def.	(Russia) Salimkhan Ibragimov	Decision (unanimous)	3	3:00	K-1 World MAX 2025 Opening Round
Intermission
Super Bantamweight 55 kg	(Japan) Akihiro Kaneko (c)	def.	(Japan) Koji Ikeda	Decision (unanimous)	3	3:00	For the K-1 Super Bantamweight title
Atomweight 46 kg	(Japan) Kira Matsutani (c)	def.	(Japan) Aki Suematsu	Ext.R Decision (split)	4	3:00	For the K-1 Atomweight title
MMA 60 kg	(Japan) Shota Nagano	def.	(Japan) Raita Hashimoto	Submission (armbar)	1		HERO'S rules
MMA Heavyweight	(Iran) Sina Karimian	vs.	(United States) Blake Troop	no contest (doctor stoppage)			HERO'S rules
Cruiserweight 90 kg	(Iran) Mahmoud Sattari	def.	(Japan) Shota Yamaguchi	KO (right hook)	2	0:38	
Cruiserweight 90 kg	(Morocco) Reda Zaidi	def.	(Japan) Seiya Tanigawa	KO (spinning back fist)	3	1:54	
Lightweight 62.5 kg	(Japan) Yuzuki Satomi	def.	(Japan) Yuma Saikyo	Ext.R Decision (split)	4	3:00	
Lightweight 62.5 kg	(Japan) Kiyomitsu Samuel Nagasawa	def.	(Japan) Kuto Ueno	Ext.R Decision (unanimous)	4	3:00	
Super Welterweight 70 kg	(Japan) Jinku Oda	def.	(Japan) Kazuki Matsumoto	Decision (majority)	3	3:00	
Preliminary Card
Super Featherweight 60 kg	(Japan) Nagisa Ito	def.	(Japan) Sakuya Ueda	Decision (unanimous)	3	3:00	
Lightweight 62.5 kg	(Japan) Koya	def.	(Japan) Raiki	Decision (unanimous)	3	3:00	
Catchweight 63 kg	(Japan) Tojo	def.	(Japan) Junpei Sano	KO (right cross)	2	2:32	

== K-1 World GP 2025 -90kg in Brasília ==
K-1 World GP 2025
- Promotion: K-1
- Date: October 4, 2025
- City: Brasília, Brazil
- Attendance: 2,000

K-1 World GP 2025 -90kg in Brasília was a kickboxing event held in co-promotion on October 4, 2025, in Brasília, Brazil.

=== 2025 K-1 GP Brazil -90kg Tournament bracket ===
Quarter-finals
(Brazil) Matheus Nogueira	UD
(Bolivia) Josias Nuñez	3
(Chile) Ivan Galaz	3
(Brazil) Modestino Rodrigues	UD
(Brazil) Marco Antonio	MD
(Brazil) Yan Problema	3
(Brazil) Joāo Pedro Simāo	UD
(Brazil) Hiago Souza	3

Semi-finals
(Brazil) Matheus Nogueira	4
(Brazil) Modestino Rodrigues	SD
(Brazil) Marco Antonio	KO
(Brazil) Joāo Pedro Simāo	2

Final
(Brazil) Modestino Rodrigues	1
(Brazil) Marco Antonio	KO

=== Fight Card ===
K-1 World GP 2025 in Brasília
Weight Class				Method	Round	Time	Notes
Cruiserweight 90kg	(Brazil) Marco Antonio	def.	(Brazil) Modestino Rodrigues	KO (punches)	1	2:20	K-1 World GP 2025 in Brasília, Final
Catchweight 71.8kg	(Brazil) André Martins	def.	(United States) Anthony Schleicher	TKO (retirement)	2	3:00	For the interim WAKO Pro K-1 Pan American Light-middleweight title
Flyweight 52kg	(Brazil) Suellen Bittencourt	def.	(Argentina) Maria Ferreira	Decision (unanimous)	3	3:00	
Catchweight 71.8kg	(Argentina) Matias Garcia	def.	(Brazil) Marcio De Jesus	TKO (punches)	1	1:52	
Cruiserweight -90kg	(Brazil) Marco Antonio	def.	(Brazil) Joāo Pedro Simāo	KO (punches)	2	0:41	K-1 World GP 2025 in Brasília, Semifinals
Cruiserweight 90kg	(Brazil) Modestino Rodrigues	def.	(Brazil) Matheus Nogueira	Ext.R Decision (split)	4	3:00	K-1 World GP 2025 in Brasília, Semifinals
Cruiserweight 90kg	(Brazil) Cleyton Nunes	vs.	(Brazil) Alessandro Avatar	TKO (low kicks)	3	1:06	K-1 World GP 2025 in Brasília, Reserve
Cruiserweight 90kg	(Brazil) Joāo Pedro Simāo	def.	(Brazil) Hiago Souza	Decision (unanimous)	3	3:00	K-1 World GP 2025 in Brasília, Quarterfinals
Cruiserweight 90kg	(Brazil) Marco Antonio	def.	(Brazil) Yan Problema	Decision (majority)	3	3:00	K-1 World GP 2025 in Brasília, Quarterfinals
Cruiserweight 90kg	(Brazil) Modestino Rodrigues	def.	(Chile) Ivan Galaz	Decision (unanimous)	3	3:00	K-1 World GP 2025 in Brasília, Quarterfinals
Cruiserweight 90kg	(Brazil) Matheus Nogueira	def.	(Bolivia) Josias Nuñez	Decision (unanimous)	3	3:00	K-1 World GP 2025 in Brasília, Quarterfinals

== K-1 World MAX 2025 - 70kg World Championship Tournament Final ==
K-1 World MAX 2025 - World Championship Tournament Final
- Promotion: K-1
- Date: November 15, 2025
- Venue: Yoyogi National Gymnasium
- City: Tokyo, Japan

K-1 World MAX 2025 - 70kg World Championship Tournament Final was a kickboxing event held by K-1 on November 15, 2025, in Tokyo, Japan.

=== K-1 World MAX 2025 - World Championship Tournament bracket ===
Opening Round (2025-09-07)
(Bulgaria) Stoyan Koprivlenski	UD
(Moldova) Denis Țapu	3
(Brazil) Minoru Kimura	KO
(United States) Mason Strodtman	1
(Senegal) Alfousseynou Kamara	KO
(Germany) Albijon Morina	1
(Kyrgyzstan) Nurtilek Zhalynbekov	3
(Netherlands) Darryl Verdonk	UD
(China) Ouyang Feng	MD
(Poland) Kacper Muszyński	3
(Brazil) Jonas Salsicha	UD
(Russia) Salimkhan Ibragimov	3
(Armenia) Zhora Akopyan	UD
(Samoa) Jonathan Aiulu	3
(France) Aymeric Lazizi	UD
(Nepal) Abiral Ghimire	3

Quarter-finals
(Bulgaria) Stoyan Koprivlenski	UD
(Thailand) Hercules WanKongOhm.WKO^{1}	3
(Senegal) Alassane Kamara^{2}	Ex.R
(Netherlands) Darryl Verdonk	UD
(China) Ouyang Feng	3
(Brazil) Jonas Salsicha	UD
(Armenia) Zhora Akopyan	KO
(France) Aymeric Lazizi	1

Semi-finals
(Bulgaria) Stoyan Koprivlenski	3
(Netherlands) Darryl Verdonk	KO
(Brazil) Jonas Salsicha	TKO
(Samoa) Jonathan Aiulu^{3}	1

Final
(Netherlands) Darryl Verdonk	1
(Brazil) Jonas Salsicha	KO

^{1} Minoru Kimura was initially scheduled to face Stoyan Koprivlenski but withdrew from the bout due to injury.
^{2} Alfousseynou Kamara was initially scheduled to face Darryl Verdonk but hurt his wand during warmp up and was replaced by his twin brother Alassane Kamara.
^{3} Zhora Akopyan withdrew from his semifinals bout due to injury and was replaced by winning reservist Jonathan Aiulu.

=== Fight Card ===
K-1 World MAX 2025 - 70kg World Championship Tournament Final
Weight Class				Method	Round	Time	Notes
Super Welterweight 70 kg	(Brazil) Jonas Salsicha	def.	(Netherlands) Darryl Verdonk	KO (body kick)	1	2:30	K-1 World MAX 2025 Tournament Final, Final
Super Lightweight 65 kg	(Japan) Taio Asahisa	def.	(Japan) Shu Inagaki	Decision (majority)	3	3:00	For the vacant K-1 Super Lightweight title
Heavyweight	(Brazil) Ariel Machado	def.	(Netherlands) Roel Mannaart (c)	TKO (punches)	1	3:00	For the K-1 Heavyweight title
Bantamweight 53 kg	(Japan) Issei Ishii	def.	(Japan) Eito Kurokawa	Decision (unanimous)	3	3:00	For the vacant K-1 Bantamweight title
Intermission
Super Welterweight 70 kg	(Brazil) Jonas Salsicha	def.	(Samoa) Jonathan Aiulu	TKO (2 knockdowns)	1	0:33	K-1 World MAX 2025 Tournament Final, Semifinals
Super Welterweight 70 kg	(Netherlands) Darryl Verdonk	def.	(Bulgaria) Stoyan Koprivlenski	KO (right hook)	3	0:46	K-1 World MAX 2025 Tournament Final, Semifinals
Super Featherweight 60 kg	(Japan) Tomoya Yokoyama	def.	(Japan) Leona Pettas	Decision (unanimous)	3	3:00	
Catchweight 56 kg	(Japan) Rui Okubo	def.	(China) Wu Yutong	KO (body kick)	1	1:41	
Super Welterweight 70 kg	(Armenia) Zhora Akopyan	def.	(France) Aymeric Lazizi	KO (left hook)	1	2:40	K-1 World MAX 2025 Tournament Final, Quarterfinals
Super Welterweight 70 kg	(Brazil) Jonas Salsicha	def.	(China) Ouyang Feng	Decision (unanimous)	3	3:00	K-1 World MAX 2025 Tournament Final, Quarterfinals
Super Welterweight 70 kg	(Netherlands) Darryl Verdonk	def.	(Senegal) Alassane Kamara	Ext.R Decision (unanimous)	4	3:00	K-1 World MAX 2025 Tournament Final, Quarterfinals
Super Welterweight 70 kg	(Bulgaria) Stoyan Koprivlenski	def.	(Thailand) Hercules WanKongOhm.WKO	Decision (unanimous)	3	3:00	K-1 World MAX 2025 Tournament Final, Quarterfinals
Super Welterweight 70 kg	(Samoa) Jonathan Aiulu	def.	(Nepal) Abiral Ghimire	Decision (majority)	3	3;00	K-1 World MAX 2025 Tournament Final, Reserve
Super Bantamweight 55 kg	(Japan) Toki Oshika	def.	(Japan) Koji Ikeda	Decision (unanimous)	3	3:00	
Featherweight 57.5 kg	(Japan) Toma	def.	(Japan) Raita Hashimoto	Ext.R Decision (unanimous)	3	3:00	
Featherweight 57.5 kg	(Japan) Haruto Matsumoto	def.	(Japan) Lyra Nagasaka	TKO (3 Knockdowns)	2	2:40	
Preliminary Card
Super Lightweight 65 kg	(Japan) Hayato Hamana	vs.	(Japan) Rintaro	KO (low kick)	1	2:36	
Super Lightweight 65 kg	(Japan) Akihiko Kawagoe	vs.	(Japan) Masato Ishikawa	Decision (unanimous)	3	3:00	
Super Featherweight 60 kg	(Japan) Musashi	def.	(Japan) Kodai Mizutani	Decision (unanimous)	3	3:00	

== K-1 World MAX Europe - Oktagon Roma ==
K-1 World MAX Europe - Oktagon Roma
- Promotion: K-1; Oktagon
- Date: November 29, 2025
- Venue: PalaPellicone Ostia
- City: Rome, Italy
- Attendance: 3,000

K-1 World MAX Europe - Oktagon Roma was a kickboxing event held in co-promotion by K-1 and Oktagon on November 29, 2025, in Rome, Italy.

=== K-1 Europe MAX -70kg Tournament bracket ===
Semi-finals
1	(Italy) Lorenzo Di Vara	SD
4	(France) Lissandre Mercier	3
3	(Ukraine) Taras Hnatchuk	TKO
2	(United Kingdom) Tom Kirk	2

Final
(Italy) Lorenzo Di Vara	UD
(Ukraine) Taras Hnatchuk	3

=== Fight Card ===
K-1 World MAX Europe - Oktagon Roma
Weight Class				Method	Round	Time	Notes
Super Cruiserweight 95 kg	(Italy) Mattia Faraoni (c)	def.	(Japan) Akira Umemura	KO (spinning wheel kick)	1	2:35	For the ISKA Oriental rules World Super-cruiserweight title
Super Welterweight 70 kg	(Italy) Lorenzo Di Vara	def.	(Ukraine) Taras Hantchuk	Decision (unanimous)	3	3:00	K-1 Europe MAX Tournament Final
Catchweight 78 kg	(Italy) Enrico Carrara	def.	(Ivory Coast) Johan Koffi	Decision (unanimous)	5	3:00	For the vacant ISKA Oriental rules World Super-middleweight title
Muay Thai 55 kg	(Italy) Alessia Coluccia	def.	(Czech Republic) Viktorie Bulinova (c)	Decision (unanimous)	5	3:00	For the ISKA Muay Thai World Bantamweight title
Muay Thai -64 kg	(Italy) Oscar Cambiaghi	def.	(Thailand) The Guide Rachanon	KO	1		
Muay Thai -57 kg	(Mongolia) Tenuun Gantushig	draw.	(Thailand) F35 Rachanon	Decision	3	3:00	
Muay Thai -57 kg	(Italy) Giuseppe Gennuso	draw.	(Thailand) Kachen Toorarak	Decision	3	3:00	
Kickboxing 52 kg	(Italy) Giorgia Pieropan	def.	(China) Geng Chunlei	Decision (unanimous)	3	3:00	
MMA 70.8 kg	(Italy) Francesco Forniaseri	def.	(Italy) Alessio Freguglia	TKO	1		
Lead Card
Super Welterweight 70 kg	(Italy) Lorenzo Di Vara	def.	(France) Lissandre Mercier	Decision (split)	3	3:00	K-1 Europe MAX Tournament Semifinals
Super Welterweight 70 kg	(Ukraine) Taras Hnatchuk	def.	(United Kingdom) Tom Kirk	TKO (eye injury)	2		K-1 Europe MAX Tournament Semifinals
Kickboxing 77 kg	(Italy) Andrea Storai	def.	(Italy) Davide Attanasio	Decision (unanimous)	3	3:00	
Kickboxing 60 kg	(Italy) Mirko Flumeri	def.	(Moldova) Alexandru Cazacinschi	Decision (unanimous)	3	3:00	
MMA 61 kg	(Italy) Pasquale Dromi	def.	(Italy) Alessio Ibba	KO	1		
MMA 84 kg	(Italy) Daniele Del'Otto	def.	(The Gambia) Kevin Sowe	KO	3		
MMA 65.8 kg	(Italy) Enrico Scazzi	def.	(Italy) Matteo Lofrano	KO			
Kickboxing 83 kg	(Italy) Riccardo Ramadori	def.	(Italy) Luca Venturato	Decision (unanimous)	3	3:00	
Kickboxing 82 kg	(Morocco) Ait Dra El Mahdi	def.	(Italy) Enrico Zamperini	KO (High kick)			
Catchweight 71 kg	(Italy) Michael Milazzo	def.	(Morocco) Ilias Sabbar	Decision	3	3:00	

== See also ==
- 2025 in Glory
- 2025 in ONE Championship
- 2025 in RISE
- 2025 in Romanian kickboxing
- 2025 in Wu Lin Feng
- 2025 in Kunlun Fight
