= Hiromi Wajima =

Japanese kickboxer (born 1995)

- Born: 和島 大海; 23 February 1995 (age 31); Shijōnawate, Osaka, Japan
- Other names: The Purple Comet; Proud Lone Samurai
- Height: 1.80 m (5 ft 11 in)
- Weight: 70 kg (154 lb; 11 st 0 lb)
- Style: Nippon Kempo, Karate, Kickboxing
- Fighting out of: Hirano, Osaka, Japan
- Team: Gesshinkai Team Samurai
- Rank: 1st Dan Black Belt in Karate; 2nd Dan Black Belt in Kendo; 3rd Dan Black Belt in Nippon Kempo
- Years active: 2015-present

Kickboxing record
- Total: 30
- Wins: 23
- By knockout: 18
- Losses: 7
- By knockout: 3

Other information
- University: Faculty of Science and Engineering at Doshisha University

Hiromi Wajima (born 23 February 1995) is a Japanese kickboxer, currently competing in the featherweight division of ONE Championship. Previously, he competed in the super welterweight division of K-1, where he was K-1 Super Welterweight champion. He is the finalist of the 2020 K-1 Super Welterweight Grand Prix.

He was ranked as the tenth-best lightweight (-71 kg) kickboxer in the world by Beyond Kick in December 2023.

== Kickboxing career ==
=== K-1 ===
==== Early career ====
Hiromi began a six fight winning streak with a first-round TKO win over Kazunari Kimura. During this run he likewise scored knockouts over Yoichi Yamazaki, Shimada Masayuki and Tanaka Yuki. Wajima won the rematch with Jinbo Katsuya during KHAOS 5, with a second-round KO.

Hiromi Wajima had his second professional career loss with a unanimous decision loss to Jordann Pikeur. He suffered his first knockout loss at the hands of Minoru Kimura, losing after only two minutes.

He snapped his losing streak at Krush 108, where Wajima won a unanimous decision against Daisuke Fujimura.

Wajima participated in the 2020 Super Welterweight Grand Prix. In the quarter final bout he faced Avatar Tor Morsri whom he defeated early in the third round with a leg kick knockout. In the semifinals he won a unanimous decision against Yasuhiro Kido. In the grand prix finals he fought a rematch with Minoru Kimura. He would fail to capture the super welterweight title, losing to Kimura for the second time in his career.

Wajima fought Raseasing Weerasakreck during K-1 World GP 2020 in Osaka. He won the fight by a second-round KO. He was scheduled to fight Yuhei Fujioka during K-1 World GP 2020 in Tokyo, and won by a second round head kick.

Wajima was scheduled to fight Abiral Ghimire at K-1 World GP 2021 in Fukuoka on July 17, 2021. He won the fight by a third-round technical knockout.

==== K-1 super welterweight champion ====
Wajima challenged Minoru Kimura for the K-1 Super Welterweight title at K-1 World GP 2021 in Osaka on December 4, 2021. They previously fought on March 22, 2020, with Kimura winning by a first-round technical knockout. Wajima was more successful in the rematch, winning the fight by a third-round knockout. He began to take over the fight from the beginning of the second round onward, with most of his success coming from body strikes, and finally stopped Kimura with a body kick which left him unable to beat the eight count.

Wajima was booked to face the former RISE welterweight champion BeyNoah at The Match 2022 on June 19, 2022. He won the fight by unanimous decision, with all three judges scoring the bout 30–24 in his favor, as he managed to knock BeyNoah down in every round of the fight.

Wajima faced the former FFC Lightweight (70.3 kg) champion Meletis Kakoubavas in a non-title bout at K-1 World GP 2022 Yokohamatsuri on September 11, 2022. He won the fight by a first-round knockout. The fight was stopped early in the opening round, as Wajima landed an inadvertent low blow on Kakoubavas.

Wajima made his first K-1 Super Welterweight title defense against the four-weight Rajadamnern Stadium champion Jomthong Chuwattana at K-1 World GP 2023: K'Festa 6 on March 12, 2023. The fight was ruled a majority decision draw after the first two rounds, with two judges having scored the bout an even 29–29, while the third judge awarded Wajima a 29–28 scorecard. Wajima won the fight by technical knockout 25 seconds into the extra fourth round.

Wajima made his second K-1 Super Welterweight title defense against the Krush Super Welterweight champion Jordann Pikeur at K-1 World GP 2023 on July 17, 2023. He won the fight by a second-round knockout.

Wajima made his third K-1 Super Welterweight title defense against the Wu Lin Feng -70 kg champion Ouyang Feng at K-1 ReBIRTH 2 on October 10, 2023. He lost the fight by a second-round knockout.

==== Post title reign ====
Wajima faced Darryl Verdonk at K-1 World MAX 2024 - World Tournament Opening Round on March 20, 2024. He lost the fight by a first-round technical knockout.

Wajima faced Kim Joon Hwa at K-1 World GP 2024 in Osaka on October 5, 2024. He won the fight by a first-round knockout.

On July 22, 2025, it was announced that Wajima's contract with K-1 had expired.

== Championships and accomplishments ==
Professional

- K-1
  - 2020 K-1 World GP Super Welterweight (-70 kg) World Grand Prix Runner-up
  - 2021 K-1 World GP Super Welterweight (-70kg) Championship
    - Two successful title defenses

Amateur

- K-1
  - 2015 K-1 Amateur All Japan A-class Tournament -70 kg Winner

Awards

- K-1 Awards
  - 2021 K-1 Awards "Skill Award"
  - 2022 K-1 Awards "Skill Award"
- eFight
  - March 2023 "Fighter of the Month"

== Kickboxing record ==
Professional Kickboxing Record
23 Wins (18 (T)KO's), 7 Losses, 0 Draw, 0 No Contest
Date	Result	Opponent	Event	Location	Method	Round	Time
2026-12-02		(Iran) Mohammad Siasarani	ONE Samurai 6	Yokohama, Japan			
2026-04-29	Win	(Argentina) Ricardo Bravo	ONE Samurai 1	Tokyo, Japan	Decision (Unanimous)	3	3:00
2025-11-16	Loss	(Algeria) Nabil Anane	ONE 173	Tokyo, Japan	Decision (Unanimous)	3	3:00
2024-12-14	Win	(Bulgaria) Stoyan Koprivlenski	K-1 World Grand Prix 2024 Final	Tokyo, Japan	Decision (Unanimous)	3	3:00
2024-10-05	Win	(South Korea) Kim Joon-hwa	K-1 World GP 2024 in Osaka	Osaka, Japan	KO (Knee to the body)	1	1:19
2024-03-20	Loss	(Netherlands) Darryl Verdonk	K-1 World MAX 2024 - World Tournament Opening Round	Tokyo, Japan	TKO (Punches)	1	3:00
Fails to qualify for K-1 World MAX 2024 World Championship Final.
2023-12-09	Loss	(China) Ouyang Feng	K-1 ReBIRTH 2	Osaka, Japan	KO (Right cross)	2	2:13
Loses the K-1 Super Welterweight title.
2023-07-17	Win	(Netherlands) Jordann Pikeur	K-1 World GP 2023	Tokyo, Japan	TKO (Referee stop./punches)	2	2:17
Defends the K-1 Super Welterweight title.
2023-03-12	Win	(Thailand) Jomthong Chuwattana	K-1 World GP 2023: K'Festa 6	Tokyo, Japan	TKO (Corner stop./Low kicks)	4	0:25
Defends the K-1 Super Welterweight title.
2022-09-11	Win	(Greece) Meletis Kakoubavas	K-1 World GP 2022 Yokohamatsuri	Yokohama, Japan	KO (Left straight)	1	1:34
2022-06-19	Win	(Japan) BeyNoah	THE MATCH 2022	Tokyo, Japan	Decision (Unanimous)	3	3:00
2021-12-04	Win	(Brazil) Minoru Kimura	K-1 World GP 2021 in Osaka	Osaka, Japan	KO (Body kick)	3	2:50
Wins the K-1 Super Welterweight title.
2021-07-17	Win	(Nepal) Abiral Himalayan Cheetah	K-1 World GP 2021 in Fukuoka	Fukuoka, Japan	KO (Low kicks)	3	2:23
2020-12-13	Win	(Japan) Yuhei Fujioka	K-1 World GP 2020 Winter's Crucial Bout	Tokyo, Japan	KO (High kick)	1	2:03
2020-09-22	Win	(Thailand) Raseasing Weerasakreck	K-1 World GP 2020 in Osaka	Osaka, Japan	KO (Uppercut)	2	0:59
2020-03-22	Loss	(Brazil) Minoru Kimura	K-1: K'Festa 3, -70 kg Championship Tournament Final	Saitama, Japan	TKO (Corner stoppage)	1	1:02
For the 2020 K-1 World GP -70kg Tournament title and the vacant K-1 Super Welterweight title.
2020-03-22	Win	(Japan) Yasuhiro Kido	K-1: K'Festa 3, -70 kg Championship Tournament Semi Finals	Saitama, Japan	Decision (Unanimous)	3	3:00
2020-03-22	Win	(Thailand) Avatar Tor.Morsri	K-1: K'Festa 3, -70 kg Championship Tournament Quarter Finals	Saitama, Japan	KO (Low kick)	3	0:40
2019-11-16	Win	(Japan) Daisuke Fujimura	Krush 108	Osaka, Japan	Decision (Unanimous)	3	3:00
2019-03-10	Loss	(Brazil) Minoru Kimura	K-1 World GP 2019: K’FESTA 2	Saitama, Japan	KO (Left hook)	1	2:20
2018-09-30	Loss	(Netherlands) Jordann Pikeur	Krush.93	Tokyo, Japan	Decision (Unanimous)	3	3:00
For the Krush Super Welterweight title.
2018-05-26	Win	(Japan) Katsuya Jinbo	KHAOS 5	Tokyo, Japan	KO (Left hook)	2	2:32
2018-03-03	Win	(China) Wang Chao	Wu Lin Feng 2018: World Championship Tianjin	Tianjin, China	KO (Left cross)	2	
2017-12-27	Win	(Japan) Yoichi Yamazaki	K-1 WORLD GP 2017 JAPAN ～SURVIVAL WARS 2017～	Tokyo, Japan	KO (Jumping knee)	3	2:06
2017-10-14	Win	(Japan) Masayuki Shimada	KHAOS 4	Tokyo, Japan	KO (Low kick)	2	2:32
2017-08-20	Win	(Japan) Tanaka Strike Yuki	Krush 79	Nagoya, Japan	KO (Low kick)	1	2:26
2017-04-22	Win	(Japan) Kazunari Kimura	K-1 World GP 2017 Super Bantamweight Championship Tournament	Tokyo, Japan	TKO (Doctor stoppage)	1	1:13
2017-01-15	Loss	(Japan) Hiroki Nakajima	Krush 72	Tokyo, Japan	Decision (Majority)	3	3:00
2016-10-09	Win	(Japan) Ryu Oda	HIGHSPEED 2016 ～higher self～	Osaka, Japan	KO (Left cross)	1	2:34
2016-07-18	Win	(Japan) Katsuya Jinbo	Krush 67	Tokyo, Japan	TKO (Punches)	2	2:37
2016-05-22	Win	(Japan) Fumiya Uezono	HIGHSPEED EX	Osaka, Japan	KO (Left cross)	1	0:24
Legend: Win Loss Draw/No contest Notes

Amateur Kickboxing Record
Date	Result	Opponent	Event	Location	Method	Round	Time
2015-08-15	Win	(Japan) Masashi Nakajima	K-1 Amateur A-class Challenge -70 kg Tournament, Final	Tokyo, Japan	Decision (Unanimous)	2	2:00
Wins K-1 Amateur All Japan A-class -70kg title.
2015-08-15	Win	(Japan) Ryunosuke Takahashi	K-1 All Japan Amateur A-class Challenge -70 kg Tournament, Semi Final	Tokyo, Japan	KO	1	
2015-06-21	Win	(Japan) Ikki Konishi	K-1 All Japan Amateur A-class Challenge -70 kg Tournament, Final	Tokyo, Japan	KO	1	
2015-06-21	Win	(Japan) Kentaro Ishibashi	K-1 Amateur A-class Challenge -70 kg Tournament, Semi Final	Tokyo, Japan	KO	1	
2015-06-21	Win	(Japan) Masashi Nakajima	K-1 Amateur A-class Challenge -70 kg Tournament, Quarter Final	Tokyo, Japan	KO	1	
2012-06-17	Win	(Japan) Yoshinobu Matsushita	KAKUMEI	Osaka, Japan	KO	2	
2012-04-22	Win	(Japan) Masahiro Iwata	KAKUMEI	Osaka, Japan	Decision (Unanimous)	3	2:00
2011-09-25	Win	(Japan) Satoshi Yamashita	KAKUMEI	Osaka, Japan	Decision (Unanimous)	2	1:30
2011-07-24	Win	(Japan) Kunio Oohashi	KAKUMEI	Osaka, Japan	KO	1	
Legend: Win Loss Draw/No contest Notes

== See also ==
- List of male kickboxers
