= Zhora Akopyan =

Belarusian-Armenian kickboxer

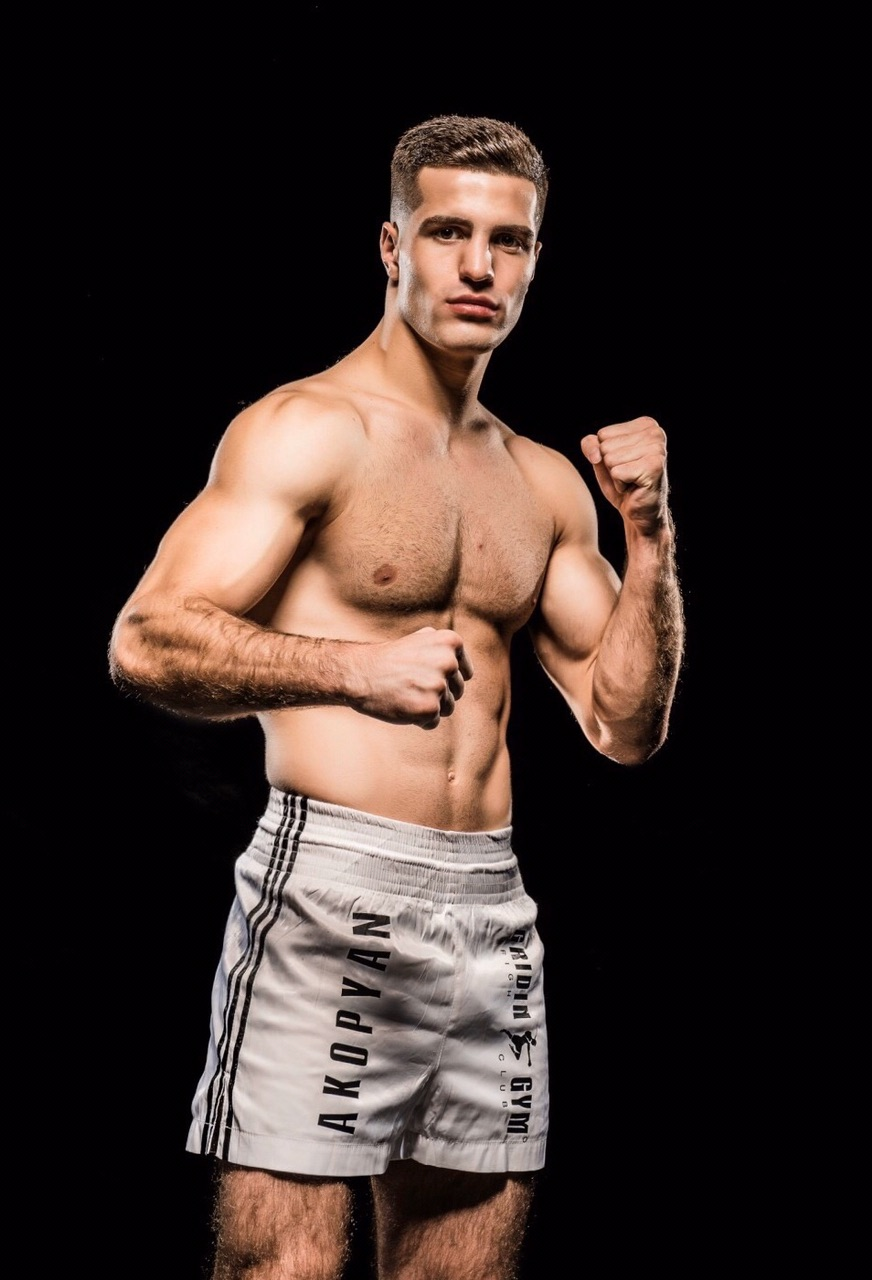
- Akopyan in 2019
- Born: Zhora Gevorgovich Akopyan; November 6, 1997 (age 28); Akhalkalaki, Georgia
- Native name: Жора Акопян
- Nationality: Armenian; Belarusian
- Height: 1.79 m (5 ft 10 1/2 in)
- Weight: 70 kg (150 lb; 11 st)
- Style: Muay Thai, Kickboxing
- Stance: Orthodox
- Fighting out of: Minsk, Belarus
- Team: Gridin Gym
- Trainer: Andrei Gridin
- Years active: 2013 - present

Kickboxing record
- Total: 41
- Wins: 34
- By knockout: 11
- Losses: 7
- By knockout: 0

Zhora Akopyan (born 6 November 1997) is a Belarusian-Armenian kickboxer. He is the former Fair Fight welterweight champion, FEA WGP lightweight champion and the 2019 Tatneft Cup lightweight tournament winner.

== Kickboxing career ==
Akopyan grew up in Polotsk, Belarus, he practiced Karate as a child. His uncle noticed his love for martial arts and brought him to a Muay Thai and Kickboxing club in his hometown when Zhora was 11. Akopyan won the IFMA gold medal in 2014 after five years of training. The following year he moved to Minsk to join Gridin gym and try to break out in the professional world.

Akopyan was scheduled to face Eduard King at KOK Elimination Tournament on October 6, 2018. He won the fight by a second-round knockout.

Akopyan was scheduled to face Mirkko Moisar at Number One Fight Show 11 on May 14, 2019. He won the fight by unanimous decision.

Akopyan was scheduled to face Vladislav Ukrainets, in 1/8 of the -70 kg tournament held on June 11, 2019. The fight went into an extra round, after which Akopyan won the decision. A month later, on July 20, Akopyan faced Yanis Budagov in the tournament quarterfinals. The fight once again went into an extra round, after which he was awarded a decision.

Akopyan was scheduled to participate in the FEA World Grand Prix, held on August 17, 2019. He beat Stanislav Kazantsev by unanimous decision in the tournament semifinals. Advancing to the finals, he faced Constantin Rusu, whom he beat by decision, after an extra round was fought.

Akopyan was scheduled to face Ilya Sokolov in the semifinals of the Tatneft Cup, held on October 4, 2019. He won the fight by decision, after an extra round was fought.

Akopyan was scheduled to face Ivan Kondratiev in the finals of the 2019 Tatneft Cup -70 kg tournament, held on December 15, 2019. He won the fight by unanimous decision.

Akopyan was scheduled to fight a rematch with Rafał Dudek at MGC Promotion on February 29, 2020. The two of them previously fought at DSF Kickboxing Challenge on August 9, 2018, with Dudek winning by decision. Akopyan was more successful in the rematch, as he won by unanimous decision.

Akopyan was scheduled to face Maxim Spodarenko at BFC 65 on December 23, 2020. He won the fight by split decision.

Akopyan was scheduled to fight Maxim Sulgin for the vacant Fair Fight -77 kg title at Fair Fight XV on August 28, 2021. He won the fight by split decision.

Akopyan was scheduled to face Jonathan Mayezo at Empire Fight - Vikings Edition on October 2, 2021. He lost the fight by majority decision.

Akopyan was scheduled to face Fabien Bignell at Tour Event Fight 9 on April 2, 2022. Akopyan withdrew from the bout, as the French Federation did not allow him to compete due to sanctions against Belarus in the context of the Russian invasion of Ukraine.

Akopyan faced Mamuka Usubyan at Fair Fight XVII on April 16, 2022 for the Fair Fight Lightweight title. He lost the fight by unanimous decision.

Akpyan defeated Daniele Iodice by unanimous decision at PetrosyanMania GOLD EDITION in Italy on April 30, 2022.

Akopyan faced Sayfullah Khambakadov in a Fair Fight lightweight title eliminator at RCC Fair Fight 19 on November 26, 2022. He won the fight by unanimous decision.

Akopyan was expected to face Vasilii Semenov in the Fair Fight lightweight tournament semifinals at RCC Fair Fight 20 on February 18, 2023. He was forced to withdraw with an injury and the bout was rescheduled for RCC 15 on May 13, 2023. He won the fight by decision.

On February 8, 2024, it was announced that Akopyan would be one of sixteen participants of the 2024 K-1 World MAX Final 16, which took place on March 20, 2024. He faced Taras Hnatchuk at K-1 World MAX 2024 - World Tournament Opening Round on March 20, 2024. Akopyan won the fight by unanimous decision.

== Championships and accomplishments ==
Professional

- TatNeft Arena
  - 2019 Tatneft Cup Lightweight (-70 kg) Tournament Winner
- Fighting Entertainment Association
  - 2019 FEA WGP Lightweight (-71 kg) Championship
- Fair Fight
  - 2021 Fair Fight Welterweight (-77 kg) Championship
- Multi Fight Club
  - 2022 MFC Lightweight (-71 kg) Championship

Amateur

- Belarus Muay Thai Federation
  - 2x Belarus Muay Thai Championships Junior Champion (2013-2014)
  - 2019 Belarus Muay Thai Championships -71 kg runner-up
- International Federation of Muaythai Associations
  - 2014 IFMA Junior World Championships -67 kg (gold)
  - 2014 IFMA Junior European Championships -67 kg (gold)
- World Association of Kickboxing Organizations
  - 2018 WAKO Belarus Kickboxing Championship -71 kg (gold)

== Fight record ==
Professional kickboxing record
34 wins (11 (T)KOs), 7 losses
Date	Result	Opponent	Event	Location	Method	Round	Time
2026-09-12	Loss	(Brazil) Jonas Salsicha	K-1 World MAX 2026 - World Tournament Opening Round	Tokyo, Japan	Decision (unanimous)	3	3:00
Fails to qualify for the 2026 K-1 World MAX World Championship Tournament Final.
2026-07-20	Win	(Japan) Kazuki Matsumoto	K-1 Dontaku 2026	Fukuoka, Japan	Decision (unanimous)	3	3:00
2025-11-15	Win	(France) Aymeric Lazizi	K-1 World MAX 2025 - World Championship Tournament Final, Quarterfinals	Tokyo, Japan	KO (left hook)	1	2:40
Akopyan withdrew from the tournament due to injury.
2025-09-07	Win	(Samoa) Jonathan Aiulu	K-1 World MAX 2025 - World Tournament Opening Round	Tokyo, Japan	Decision (unanimous)	3	3:00
Qualifies for K-1 World MAX 2025 World Championship Tournament Final.
2025-07-13	Win	(Japan) Riku	K-1 Dontaku	Fukuoka, Japan	KO (punches)	1	2:51
2024-12-07	Win	(Russia) Vladimir Tulaev	RCC Fair Fight 28	Yekaterinburg, Russia	Decision (unanimous)	3	3:00
2024-10-05	Loss	(Netherlands) Darryl Verdonk	K-1 World GP 2024 in Osaka	Osaka, Japan	Ext.R decision (unanimous)	4	3:00
2024-07-07	Loss	(Poland) Kacper Muszyński	K-1 World MAX 2024 - World Championship Tournament Final, Quarter Finals	Tokyo, Japan	Decision (unanimous)	3	3:00
2024-03-20	Win	(Ukraine) Taras Hnatchuk	K-1 World MAX 2024 - World Tournament Opening Round	Tokyo, Japan	Decision (unanimous)	3	3:00
Qualifies for K-1 World MAX 2024 World Championship Tournament Final.
2024-02-03	Win	(Russia) Andrey Elin	RCC Fair Fight 26	Yekaterinburg, Russia	KO (knee to the head)	1	
2023-09-23	Loss	(Russia) Aleksei Ulianov	RCC Intro 28	Yekaterinburg, Russia	Decision (unanimous)	5	3:00
For the interim RCC Fair Fight -70kg title.
2023-05-13	Win	(Russia) Vasilii Semenov	RCC 15	Yekaterinburg, Russia	Ext. R. decision (unanimous)	4	3:00
2022-11-26	Win	(Russia) Saifullah Khambakhadov	RCC Fair Fight 19	Yekaterinburg, Russia	Decision (unanimous)	3	3:00
2022-04-30	Win	(Italy) Daniele Iodice	PetrosyanMania GOLD EDITION	Milan, Italy	Decision (unanimous)	3	3:00
2022-04-16	Loss	(Russia) Mamuka Usubyan	Fair Fight XVII	Yekaterinburg, Russia	Decision (unanimous)	5	3:00
For the Fair Fight -70kg title.
2022-03-05	Win	(Egypt) Abdalla Nagy	MFC 1	Yerevan, Armenia	TKO (punches)	4	0:30
Wins the inaugural MFC -72kg title.
2021-10-02	Loss	(France) Jonathan Mayezo	Empire Fight - Vikings Edition	Montbéliard, France	Decision (majority)	5	3:00
For the Empire Fight Kickboxing -70kg Title.
2021-08-28	Win	(Russia) Maxim Sulgin	Fair Fight XV	Yekaterinburg, Russia	Decision (split)	5	3:00
Wins the vacant Fair Fight -77kg title.
2021-08-07	Win	(France) Mathieu Tavares	Number One Fight Show 13	Tallinn, Estonia	KO (left hook to the body)	2	
2020-12-23	Win	(Belarus) Maxim Spodarenko	BFC 65	Minsk, Belarus	Decision (split)	3	3:00
2020-03-21	Win	(Russia) Vladislav Ukrainets	Fair Fight XI	Yekaterinburg, Russia	KO (left hook to the body)	2	
2020-02-29	Win	(Poland) Rafał Dudek	MGC Promotion	Minsk, Belarus	Decision (unanimous)	3	3:00
2019-12-15	Win	(Russia) Ivan Kondratev	Tatneft Cup, -70 kg Tournament Final	Kazan, Russia	Decision (unanimous)	3	3:00
Wins 2019 Tatneft Cup -70kg title.
2019-11-23	Win	(Netherlands) Aaras Anass	Number One Fight Show	Tallinn, Estonia	KO (punches)	2	2:32
2019-10-04	Win	(Russia) Ilya Sokolov	Tatneft Cup, -70 kg Tournament Semi Final	Kazan, Russia	Ext.R decision	4	3:00
2019-08-17	Win	(Moldova) Constantin Rusu	FEA WGP, Final	Odesa, Ukraine	Ext.R decision (unanimous)	4	3:00
Wins FEA WGP -71kg title.
2019-08-17	Win	(Ukraine) Stanislav Kazantsev	FEA WGP, Semi Final	Odesa, Ukraine	Decision (unanimous)	3	3:00
2019-07-20	Win	(Russia) Yanis Budagov	Tatneft Cup, -70 kg Tournament Quarter Final	Kazan, Russia	Ext.R decision	4	3:00
2019-06-11	Win	(Russia) Vladislav Ukrainets	Tatneft Cup, -70 kg Tournament 1/8 Final	Kazan, Russia	Ext.R decision	4	3:00
2019-05-14	Win	(Estonia) Mirkko Moisar	Number One Fight Show 11	Tallinn, Estonia	Decision (unanimous)	3	3:00
2018-10-06	Win	(Ukraine) Eduard King	KOK Elimination Tournament	Chișinău, Moldova	KO	2	
2018-08-09	Loss	(Poland) Rafał Dudek	DSF Kickboxing Challenge: Twierdza	Nowy Dwór, Poland	Decision	3	3:00
2017-11-17	Win	(Ukraine) Dmitry Nikokoshev	Royal Fight Minsk	Minsk, Belarus	Decision	3	3:00
2016-04-23	Win	(Lithuania) Henrikas Vikšraitis		Lithuania	Decision	3	3:00
2016-04-23	Win	(Latvia) Sigurds Krauklis		Lithuania	KO	2	
2015-11-10	Win	(Lithuania) Erlandas Kaminsky		Latvia	KO	1	
2015-11-10	Win	(Latvia) Elvis Jansons		Latvia	Decision	3	3:00
2015-05-23	Win	(Latvia) Kirill Andreev		Latvia	KO	1	
2014-01-26	Win	(Belarus) Ilya Kharlamov	League of combat	Belarus	Decision	3	3:00
2014-01-26	Win	(Belarus) Maxim Savchits	League of combat	Belarus	Decision	3	3:00
2013-02-23	Win	(Belarus) Dmitry Filonchik		Belarus	Decision	3	3:00
Legend: Win Loss Draw/no contest Notes

Amateur Muay Thai record
Date	Result	Opponent	Event	Location	Method	Round	Time
2014-05-	Win	(England) Corrie Ellis	IFMA World Championship, Final	Malaysia	Decision		
Wins IFMA World Championship Junior -67kg Gold Medal.
Legend: Win Loss Draw/no contest Notes

== See also ==
- List of male kickboxers
