= Shamiram, Armenia =

Shamiram Շամիրամ
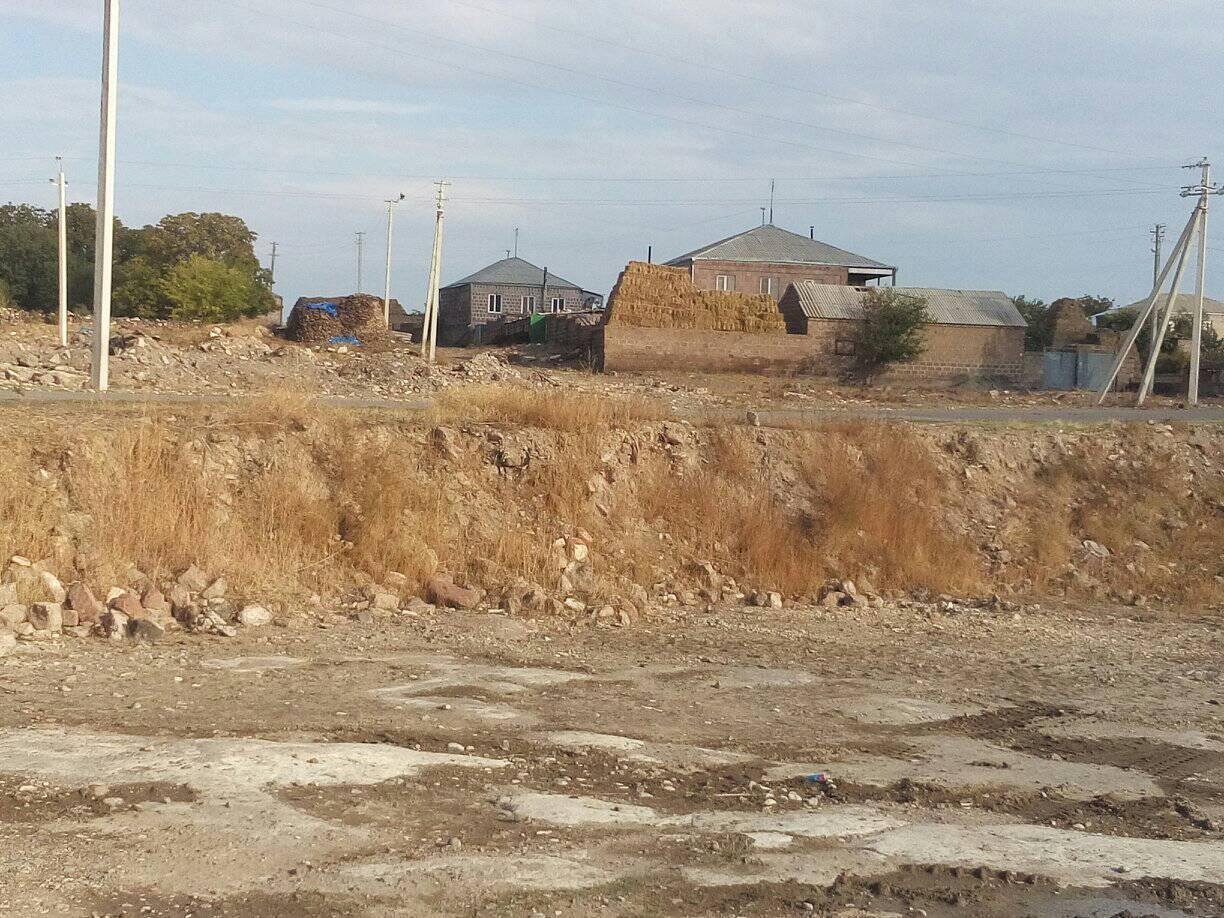
- Շամրիրամ, Արագածոտն

- Location within Armenia Location within Aragatsotn
- Coordinates: 40°16′34″N 44°06′03″E
- Country: Armenia
- Province: Aragatsotn
- Municipality: Shamiram

Population (2022)
  - Total: 1,364
- Time zone: UTC+4
  - Summer (DST): UTC+5

Shamiram (Armenian: Շամիրամ), is a village in the Shamiram Municipality of the Aragatsotn Province of Armenia. It is mostly populated by Yazidis. The village is named after the Assyrian legendary queen Semiramis.

== Notable people ==
- Mamuka Usubyan, professional boxer and kickboxer
