= Abiral Ghimire =

Nepalese kickboxer (born 1999)

Abhiral Ghimire
- Born: 9 September 1999 (age 27); Kathmandu, Nepal
- Nickname: Himalayan Cheetah
- Nationality: Nepalese
- Height: 1.85 m (6 ft 1 in)
- Weight: 70.0 kg (154.3 lb; 11.02 st)
- Division: Welterweight
- Style: Kickboxing
- Stance: Orthodox
- Fighting out of: Nagoya, Japan
- Team: Shimura Dojo
- Years active: 2017 - present

Kickboxing record
- Total: 29
- Wins: 21
- By knockout: 20
- Losses: 8
- By knockout: 4

Abiral Ghimire (Note: Nepali: अबिरल घिमिरे) (born 9 September 1999), also known by his ring name Abiral Himalayan Cheetah (Note: Japanese: アビラル・ヒマラヤンチーター) is a Nepalese professional kickboxer. He is the current ISKA K-1 World Super Welterweight Champion.

== Background ==
Abhiral Ghimire is originally from Gurjudhara in the Chandragiri, Nepal. He went to Japan in 2016 and started kickboxing inspired by his father who also was a kick boxer and participated in "K-1 WORLD GP 2004 in SEOUL" held in Korea in 2004 under the name of Dave Kumar Ghimire. He also fought Minowaman in 2011 at Gladiator 27 under mixed martial arts rules. Abiral's ring name "Himalayan Cheetah" is said to have come from his father's desire to "become a fighter who beats his opponent ferociously like a cheetah."

== Kickboxing career ==
=== Early career ===
Ghimire made his professional debut against Negi Majin at HEAT 41 on December 23, 2017. He won the fight by a first-round knockout.

Ghimire extended his winning streak to three fights with a stoppage victory against Lada at S.BATTLE 15 on April 15, 2018, and a decision victory against Pan Soo Kim at HEAT 42 on May 27, 2018. These victories earned Ghimire a place in the HEAT 43 Middleweight tournament, held on September 17, 2018. He beat Yohei Fujioka by a first-round technical knockout, but lost to Bruno Gazani by unanimous decision in the finals.

=== HEAT Middleweight champion ===
==== Title run ====
Ghimire faced Kyung Jae Cho at HEAT 44 on March 2, 2019. He won the fight by a second-round knockout. Ghimire faced Franco Gutierrez at HEAT 45 on July 28, 2019. He won the fight by a second-round knockout. Ghimire faced Akihi Aoya at S.BATTLE on November 3, 2019. He won the fight by a first-round technical knockout.

==== Title reign ====
His three-fight winning streak earned Ghimire the chance to fight Ichiyo Morimoto at HEAT 46 on January 19, 2020, for the HEAT Middleweight title. He won the title by a first-round knockout, landing a right hook at the 2:20 minute mark. Ghimire made his first title defense eight months later, against Tatsuya at HEAT 47 on September 13, 2020. He successfully defended the title by a first-round knockout, stopping his opponent with a left knee midway through the round.

=== K-1 ===
Ghimire fought reigning super-welterweight K-1 champion Minoru Kimura in a non-title bout at K-1 World GP 2020 in Tokyo on December 13, 2020. He lost the fight by a second-round technical knockout, after the ringside doctor stopped the fight due to a cut above Abiral's left eye.

Ghimire fought Kotetsu at K-1 World GP 2021: K’Festa 4 Day.2 on March 28, 2021. He won the fight by a first-round knockout. Ghimire made his return to HEAT against Eiji Yoshida at HEAT 48 on April 25, 2021. He won the fight by a first-round technical knockout. Ghimire faced Hiromi Wajima at K-1 World GP 2021 in Fukuoka on July 17, 2021. He lost the fight by a third-round low kick knockout. Ghimire fought Daisuke Fujimura for the HEAT Kick -70 kg title at HEAT 49 on October 17, 2021. He won the fight by a first-round technical knockout.

Ghimire faced Daiki Matsushita at K-1 World GP 2022 Japan on February 27, 2022. He won the fight by a first-round technical knockout, stopping Matsushita with a flurry of punches at the 2:00 minute mark of the opening round. Ghimire faced Raseasing Weerasakreck in a non-title bout at HEAT 50 on May 7, 2022. He won the fight by knockout in the first round with a body shot. Ghimire faced four-weight Rajadamnern Stadium champion Jomthong Chuwattana at K-1 World GP 2022 Yokohamatsuri on September 11, 2022. He lost the fight by a first-round head kick knockout.

Ghimire faced the Krush Super Welterweight champion Jordann Pikeur at K-1 World GP 2023: K'Festa 6 on March 12, 2023. He lost the fight by a third-round knockout. Ghimire made his third HEAT Kick Middleweight title defense against Chang Won Yang at HEAT 52 x AFC 27 on August 19, 2023. He won the fight by a first-round knockout. Ghimire faced Riku at K-1 ReBIRTH 2 on December 9, 2023. He lost the fight by unanimous decision, with scores of 30–26, 30–26 and 29–26, after being knocked down once in the opening round.

Ghimire made his fourth HEAT Kick Middleweight title defense against Jin Hirayama at HEAT 53 on April 27, 2024. He won the fight by a fourth-round technical knockout. Ghimire defeated Antonin Marconi by first round technical knockout on October 26, 2024, for the vacant ISKA K-1 Intercontinental Super Welterweight title.

Ghimire challenged the Krush Super Welterweight (-70kg) champion Jinku Oda at Krush 175 on May 18, 2025. He won the fight by a second-round knockout. Ghimire faced Aymeric Lazizi in the opening round of the K-1 World MAX 2025 World Championship Tournament on September 7, 2025. He lost the fight by unanimous decision. Ghimire faced Jonathan Aiulu in the 2025 World MAX Reserve bout at K-1 World MAX 2025 - World Championship Tournament Final on November 15, 2025. He lost the fight by majority decision, with score of 30—29, 30—29 and 29—29.

He faced Matthan Choinard at HEAT 59 on September 5, 2026, winning by knockout.

== Championships and awards ==
- HEAT
  - 2020 HEAT Kick Middleweight Championship (three title defenses)
- International Sport Kickboxing Association
  - 2024 ISKA K-1 Intercontinental Super Welterweight Champion
  - 2026 ISKA K-1 World Super Welterweight
- Krush
  - 2025 2025 Krush Super Welterweight (-70kg) Champion
    - One successful title defense

== Kickboxing record ==
Professional kickboxing record
21 wins (20 (T)KOs), 7 losses, 0 draws
Date	Result	Opponent	Event	Location	Method	Round	Time	Record
2026-09-05	Win	(France) Matthan Choinard	HEAT 59	Nagoya, Japan	KO	2	2:33	21–8
Wins the vacant ISKA K-1 World Super Welterweight title.
2026-03-28	Win	(Japan) Riku	Krush 188	Tokyo, Japan	KO (right cross)	3	1:52	20–8
Defends the Krush Super Welterweight (-70kg) title.
2025-11-15	Loss	(Samoa) Jonathan Aiulu	K-1 World MAX 2025 - World Championship Tournament Final, Reserve bout	Tokyo, Japan	Decision (majority)	3	3:00	19–8
2025-09-07	Loss	(France) Aymeric Lazizi	K-1 World MAX 2025 - World Tournament Opening Round	Tokyo, Japan	Decision (unanimous)	3	3:00	19–7
Fails to qualify for K-1 World MAX 2025 World Championship Tournament Final.
2025-05-18	Win	(Japan) Jinku Oda	Krush 175	Osaka, Japan	KO (punches)	2	1:15	19–6
Wins the Krush Super Welterweight (-70kg) title.
2025-02-09	Win	(Japan) Yasuhito Shirasu	K-1 World MAX 2025	Tokyo, Japan	TKO (corner stoppage)	3	1:13	18–6
2024-10-26	Win	(France) Antonin Marconi	HEAT 55	Nagoya, Japan	TKO (3 knockdowns)	2	2:10	17–6
Wins the vacant ISKA K-1 Intercontinental Super Welterweight title.
2024-04-27	Win	(Japan) Jin Hirayama	HEAT 53	Nagoya, Japan	TKO (punches)	4	1:42	16–6
Defends the HEAT Kick -70kg title.
2023-12-09	Loss	(Japan) Riku	K-1 ReBIRTH 2	Tokyo, Japan	Decision (unanimous)	3	3:00	15–6
2023-08-19	Win	(South Korea) Chang Won Yang	HEAT 52 x AFC 27	Tokyo, Japan	KO (punches)	1	2:08	15–5
Defends the HEAT Kick -70kg title.
2023-03-12	Loss	(Netherlands) Jordann Pikeur	K-1 World GP 2023: K'Festa 6	Tokyo, Japan	KO (left hook)	3	0:06	14–5
2022-09-11	Loss	(Thailand) Jomthong Chuwattana	K-1 World GP 2022 Yokohamatsuri	Yokohama, Japan	KO (high kick)	1	3:02	14–4
2022-05-07	Win	(Thailand) Raseasing Weerasakreck	HEAT 50	Nagoya, Japan	KO (left hook to the body)	1	2:54	14–3
2022-02-27	Win	(Japan) Daiki Matsushita	K-1 World GP 2022 Japan	Tokyo, Japan	TKO (punches)	1	2:00	13–3
2021-10-17	Win	(Japan) Daisuke Fujimura	HEAT 49	Nagoya, Japan	TKO (doctor stoppage)	1	0:57	12–3
Defends HEAT Kick -70kg title.
2021-07-17	Loss	(Japan) Hiromi Wajima	K-1 World GP 2021 in Fukuoka	Fukuoka, Japan	KO (low kicks)	3	2:23	11–3
2021-04-25	Win	(Japan) Eiji Yoshida	HEAT 48	Nagoya, Japan	TKO (3 knockdowns/punches)	1	1:24	11–2
2021-03-28	Win	(Japan) Kotetsu	K-1 World GP 2021: K’Festa 4 Day.2	Tokyo, Japan	KO (punches & knee)	1	2:21	10–2
2020-12-13	Loss	(Brazil) Minoru Kimura	K-1 World GP 2020 in Tokyo	Tokyo, Japan	TKO (doctor stoppage)	2	2:50	9–2
2020-09-13	Win	(Japan) Tatsuya	HEAT 47	Nagoya, Japan	KO (left knee)	1	1:44	9–1
Defends HEAT Kick -70kg title.
2020-01-19	Win	(Japan) Ichiyo Morimoto	HEAT 46	Nagoya, Japan	KO (right hook)	1	2:20	8–1
Wins HEAT Kick -70kg title.
2019-11-03	Win	(Japan) Akihi Aoya	S.BATTLE	Okazaki, Japan	TKO	1	1:59	7–1
2019-07-28	Win	(Bolivia) Franco Gutierrez	HEAT 45	Nagoya, Japan	KO (3 knockdowns)	2	2:58	6–1
2019-03-02	Win	(South Korea) Kyung Jae Cho	HEAT 44	Nagoya, Japan	KO (knees & punches)	2	1:29	5–1
2018-09-17	Loss	(Brazil) Bruno Gazani	HEAT 43, Final	Nagoya, Japan	Decision (unanimous)	3	3:00	4–1
2018-09-17	Win	(Japan) Yohei Fujioka	HEAT 43, Semi Final	Nagoya, Japan	TKO (2 knockdowns)	1	2:53	4–0
2018-05-27	Win	(South Korea) Pan Soo Kim	HEAT 42	Nagoya, Japan	Decision (unanimous)	3	3:00	3–0
2018-04-15	Win	(Japan) Lada	S.BATTLE 15	Okazaki, Japan	Ext.R TKO (corner stoppage)	4		2–0
2017-12-23	Win	(Japan) Negi Majin	HEAT 41	Nagoya, Japan	KO (punch)	1	1:11	1–0
Legend: Win Loss Draw/no contest Notes

== See also ==
- List of male kickboxers
