= Younes Smaili =

Dutch-Moroccan kickboxer

- Born: 20 June 1998 (age 28); Rotterdam, Netherlands
- Nationality: Dutch; Moroccan
- Height: 177 cm (5 ft 10 in)
- Weight: 72.0 kg (158.7 lb; 11.34 st)
- Style: Kickboxing
- Stance: Orthodox
- Fighting out of: Rotterdam, Netherlands
- Team: ARJ Trainingen (2024-Present) Oude Westen Gym/Fighting Talents (former)
- Trainer: Mike Polanen

Kickboxing record
- Total: 48
- Wins: 43
- By knockout: 20
- Losses: 5
- By knockout: 2

Mixed martial arts record
- Total: 1
- Wins: 0
- Losses: 1
- By disqualification: 1

Younes Smaili (born 20 June 1998) is a Dutch-Moroccan kickboxer and mixed martial artist.

As of January 2025 he was the #7 ranked lightweight kickboxer in the world by Combat Press.

== Career ==
=== Early career ===
On 19 November 2016, Smaili traveled to China to face Wang Yuanlei at EM Legend 14. He won the fight by unanimous decision.

Smaili faced Masaaki Noiri at K-1 World GP 2017 Lightweight Championship Tournament event on 25 February 2017. He lost the fight by unanimous decision after receiving an eight count.

On 29 October 2017, Smaili took part in a 4-man World Fighting League 67 kg tournament. In the semifinals he defeated Yassir El Atmioui by technical knockout in the first round. In the final he defeated Damian Johansen by unanimous decision.

On 25 March 2018, Smaili faced Siyar Fakhari at a World Fighting League event. He won the fight by decision.

On 22 September 2018, Smaili faced Jordy Laret at the World Fighting League Final 8 event. He won the fight by decision.

Smaili took part in the 2019 World Fighting League lightweight tournament, which took place on 18 February 2019. In the quarterfinals he defeated Zhaid Zahirov by decision. He lost in the semifinal bout against Mohamed Hendouf by first-round stoppage.

=== Enfusion ===
Smaili faced Amier Abdulahad at Enfusion 95 in Eindhoeven on 29 February 2020. He won the fight by unanimous decision.

On 24 September 2022, Smaili faced Darryl Verdonk for the vacant Enfusion -70 kg title at Enfusion 112 in Eindhoven. Smaili lost the fight by technical knockout in the fourth round after he retired due to a rib injury.

On 10 June 2023, Smaili took part in an 8-man 70 kg tournament at 8TKO #3. In the quarterfinals he defeated Mervin Moor by unanimous decision. In the semifinals he defeated Youssef El Haji also by unanimous decision to reach the next round. In the final Smaili faced Fouad Chabari and defeated him by second-round technical knockout to win the tournament.

=== Glory ===
Smaili made his debut for the Glory promotion at Glory 94 against James Condé. He won the fight by unanimous decision.

On 7 December 2024, Smaili faced Tayfun Özcan at Glory Collision 7. He won the fight by split decision.

== Titles and accomplishments ==
- International Fight Promotion
  - 2025 IFP K-1 Welterweight (-75 kg) Champion
- Enfusion
  - 2023 8TKO Lightweight Tournament Winner
- World Fighting League
  - 2017 WFL -67 kg Tournament Winner

== Kickboxing record ==
Professional Kickboxing record
43 Wins (20 (T)KO's), 5 Losses, 0 Draw, 0 No Contest
Date	Result	Opponent	Event	Location	Method	Round	Time
2027-01-16		(Morocco) Anouar Afakir	Glory Rivals 7	Almere, Netherlands			
2025-12-14	Win	(Netherlands) Mike Frenken	IFP Cage Series	Genk, Belgium	TKO (calf kicks)	2	1:30
Wins the inaugural IFP World Welterweight (-75kg) title.
2025-05-01	Loss	(Suriname) Don Sno	Glory Underground	Miami, Florida, US	Decision (Split)	3	3:00
2024-12-07	Win	(Turkey) Tayfun Özcan	Glory Collision 7	Arnhem, Netherlands	Decision (Split)	3	3:00
2024-08-31	Win	(France) James Condé	Glory 94	Antwerp, Belgium	Decision (Unanimous)	3	3:00
2023-06-10	Win	(Morocco) Fouad Chahbari	8TKO #3 – 70 kg Final 8, Final	Alkmaar, Netherlands	TKO (Corner stoppage)	2	
Wins 2023 8TKO -70kg Tournament title.
2023-06-10	Win	(Morocco) Youssef El Haji	8TKO #3 – 70 kg Final 8, Semifinals	Alkmaar, Netherlands	Decision (Unanimous)	3	3:00
2023-06-10	Win	(Suriname) Mervin Moor	8TKO #3 – 70 kg Final 8, Quarterfinals	Alkmaar, Netherlands	Decision (Unanimous)	3	3:00
2023-03-18	Loss	(China) Han Wenbao	Wu Lin Feng 535: China vs Netherlands	Tangshan, China	Decision (Unanimous)	3	3:00
2023-03-04	Win	(Albania) Valdrin Vatnikaj	8TKO #1 – 70 kg Last 16	Alkmaar, Netherlands	KO (Knees)	2	3:00
2022-09-24	Loss	(Netherlands) Darryl Verdonk	Enfusion 111 & 112	Eindhoven, Netherlands	TKO (retirement/injury)	4	
For the vacant Enfusion Lightweight World Championship.
2022-06-11	Win	(Belgium) Conan Saelens	Enfusion 108	Alkmaar, Netherlands	Decision (Unanimous)	3	3:00
2020-02-29	Win	(Egypt) Amier Abdulahad	Enfusion 95	Eindhoven, Netherlands	Decision (Unanimous)	3	3:00
2019-12-14	Win	(Afghanistan) Ali Rezaie	Fight Vision Europe 2	Duisburg, Germany	Decision (Unanimous)	3	3:00
2019-02-18	Loss	(Belgium) Mohamed Hendouf	World Fighting League, Semifinal	Almere, Netherlands	TKO (retirement/injury)	1	
2019-02-18	Win	(Netherlands) Zahid Zahirov	World Fighting League, Quarterfinal	Almere, Netherlands	Decision	3	3:00
2018-11-17	Win	(Brazil) Rodrigo Mineiro	Fight Time meets WFL New Talents	Noordwijkerhout, Netherlands	TKO	3	
2018-09-22	Win	(Suriname) Jordy Laret	World Fighting League Final 8	Almere, Netherlands	Decision	3	3:00
2018-04-14	Win	(Morocco) Anass Aaras	Alphen Fight Night III	Alphen aan den Rijn, Netherlands	Decision (Unanimous)	5	3:00
2018-03-25	Win	(Netherlands) Siyar Fakhari	World Fighting League	Almere, Netherlands	Decision	3	3:00
2017-11-04	Win	(China) Li Yankun	Wu Lin Feng 2017: Yi Long VS Sitthichai	Kunming, China	Decision (Unanimous)	3	3:00
2017-10-29	Win	(Netherlands) Damian Johansen	WFL Final 16 – 67 kg Tournament, Final	Almere, Netherlands	Decision (Unanimous)	3	3:00
Wins 2017 World Fighting League -67kg Tournament title.
2017-10-29	Win	(Morocco) Yassir El Atmioui	WFL Final 16 – 67 kg Tournament, Semifinal	Almere, Netherlands	TKO	1	
2017-04-23	Win	(Netherlands) Jackie Dings	World Fighting League	Almere, Netherlands	Decision (Unanimous)	3	3:00
2017-02-25	Loss	(Japan) Masaaki Noiri	K-1 World GP 2017 Lightweight Championship Tournament	Saitama, Japan	Decision (Unanimous)	3	3:00
2016-11-19	Win	(China) Wang Yuanlei	EM Legend 14	Emei, China	Decision (Unanimous)	3	3:00
2016-05-22	Win	(Netherlands) Luciano Babel	IJmuiden Fight Night 2	IJmuiden, Netherlands	TKO (Punches)	1	2:35
2016-04-03	Win	(Turkey) Oguzhan Cabri	World Fighting League	Hoofddorp, Netherlands	Decision (Unanimous)	3	3:00
2016-02-28	Win	(Netherlands) Bowie Zonneveld	Haarlem Fight Night, Final	Haarlem, Netherlands	Decision (Unanimous)	5	2:00
2016-02-28	Win	(Morocco) Nordin Akalai	Haarlem Fight Night, Semifinal	Haarlem, Netherlands	Decision (Unanimous)	5	2:00
2016-02-28	Win	(Morocco) Faouzi El Kanddousi	Haarlem Fight Night, Quarterfinal	Haarlem, Netherlands	Decision (Unanimous)	5	2:00
Legend: Win Loss Draw/No contest Notes

== Mixed martial arts record ==
Professional record breakdown
1 match	0 wins	1 loss
By disqualification	0	1

Res.	Record	Opponent	Method	Event	Date	Round	Time	Location	Notes
Loss	0–1	Ebrima St. Louis	DQ (illegal soccer kick)	Levels Fight League 23	5 July 2026	1	2:41	Amsterdam, Netherlands	Catchweight (162 lb) bout.

== See also ==
- List of male kickboxers
