= Rhys Brudenell =

British kickboxer

- Born: 11 August 1993 (age 33); London, United Kingdom
- Height: 1.89 m (6 ft 2 in)
- Weight: 112 kg (247 lb; 17.6 st)
- Style: Kickboxing
- Stance: Orthodox
- Fighting out of: London, United Kingdom
- Team: Prizefighter

Kickboxing record
- Total: 30
- Wins: 25
- By knockout: 21
- Losses: 5
- By knockout: 4
- Draws: 0
- No contests: 0

Rhys Brudenell (born 11 August 1993) is a British kickboxer. He is the KGP Heavyweight champion and the K-1 World GP 2024 in Sicily winner.

== Career ==
On 9 October 2021 Brudenell took part in a 4-man tournament at Road to ONE: Muay Thai Grand Prix. In the semifinals he defeated Alan Zomkowski by first-round knockout with a series of punches. In the final he defeated Claudio Istrate by first-round knockout.

Brudenell faced Tariq Osaro at Glory 80 Studio on 14 May 2022. He lost the fight by a third-round technical knockout.

On 28 October 2023 Brudenell made his debut for the MTGP promotion at MTGP 85 where he faced Thomas Gosso for the vacant KGP Heavyweight title. He won the fight by unanimous decision.

Brudenell faced Sergej Maslobojev at KOK 117 Mega Series on 18 November 2023 in Vilnius, Lithuania. He lost the fight by first-round knockout.

Brudenell successfully defended his KGP Heavyweight title at MTGP 86 on 23 March 2024, against Jakub Doman, defeating him by first-round knockout.

Brudenell took part in the K-1 World GP 2024 in Sicily on 27 July 2024. In the quarterfinals he defeated Pavlos Kochliaridis by first-round knockout. In the semifinals he defeated Samuele Pugliese by second-round knockout and in the final he knocked out Florin Ivănoaie to win the Grand Prix and qualify for the K-1 World Grand Prix 2024 Final.

== Titles and accomplishments ==
- Muay Thai Grand Prix
  - 2023 KGP World Super Heavyweight Champion
    - One successful title defense
- K-1
  - K-1 World GP 2024 in Sicily Winner
- Ronin Fighting Championship
  - 2025 Ronin FC Heavyweight Champion
- SENSHI
  - 2025 Senshi Heavyweight Grand Prix runner-up

== Kickboxing record ==
25 wins (21 (T)KOs), 5 losses
Date	Result	Opponent	Event	Location	Method	Round	Time
2025-09-13	Loss	(Turkey) Samet Agdeve	SENSHI 28 - Grand Prix, Final	Varna, Bulgaria	Decision (unanimous)	3	3:00
For the 2025 SENSHI Heavyweight Grand Prix title.
2025-09-13	Win	(Brazil) Bruno Chaves	SENSHI 28 - Grand Prix, Semifinals	Varna, Bulgaria	Decision (unanimous)	3	3:00
2025-09-13	Win	(Albania) Françesko Xhaja	SENSHI 28 - Grand Prix, Quarterfinals	Varna, Bulgaria	TKO (2 knockdowns/low kicks)	2	
2025-07-12	Win	(United Kingdom) Ben Vickers	Ronin Fighting Championship	London, England	TKO (retirement/low kicks)	2	1:36
Wins the vacant Ronin Fighting Championship Heavyweight title.
2024-12-14	Loss	(Brazil) Ariel Machado	K-1 World Grand Prix 2024 Final, Quarterfinal	Tokyo, Japan	KO (right hook)	1	2:35
2024-07-27	Win	(Romania) Florin Ivănoaie	K-1 World GP 2024 in Sicily, Final	Rosolini, Italy	KO (left hook)	2	0:46
Wins K-1 World GP 2024 in Sicily and qualifies for K-1 World Grand Prix 2024 Final.
2024-07-27	Win	(Italy) Samuele Pugliese	K-1 World GP 2024 in Sicily, Semifinal	Rosolini, Italy	TKO (2 knockdowns/punches)	1	0:32
2024-07-27	Win	(Greece) Pavlos Kochliaridis	K-1 World GP 2024 in Sicily, Quarterfinal	Rosolini, Italy	KO (left hook)	1	0:57
2024-03-23	Win	(United Kingdom) Jakub Doman	MTGP London	London, England	KO (left hook)	1	0:29
Defends the KGP World Super Heavyweight title.
2023-11-18	Loss	(Lithuania) Sergej Maslobojev	KOK 117 Mega Series	Vilnius, Lithuania	KO (punches)	1	0:35
2023-10-28	Win	(France) Thomas Gosso	MTGP Fight Night 85	London, England	Decision (unanimous)	3	3:00
Wins the KGP World Super Heavyweight title.
2023-07-08	Win	(Poland) Dawid Panfil	Combat Fight Series 14	Croydon, England	KO (left hook)	1	0:51
2022-05-14	Loss	(Nigeria) Tariq Osaro	Glory 80 Studio	Netherlands	TKO (punches)	3	0:29
2021-11-06	Win	(United Kingdom) Kofi Marshall	Combat Fight Series 6	Croydon, England	KO (knee to the head)	1	1:10
2021-10-09	Win	(Italy) Claudio Istrate	Road to ONE: Muay Thai Grand Prix, Tournament Final	London, England	TKO (punches)	1	2:40
2021-10-09	Win	(Poland) Alan Zomkowski	Road to ONE: Muay Thai Grand Prix, Tournament Semifinal	London, England	TKO (Punches)	1	1:30
2020-03-08	Win	(United Kingdom) Thomas Daniels	Combat Fight Series 4	London, England	KO (right hook)	2	2:41
2020-02-01	Win	(Moldova) Alexandru Velenciuc	Super Fight Series IX	Dunstable, England	TKO (referee stoppage)	1	1:36
2019-04-20	Win	(United Kingdom) George Davies	Victory Fights 4	London, England	Decision (split)	3	3:00
2018-11-17	Win	(United Kingdom) James Summer	Welsh Combat League 7	Wales	TKO (punches)	2	1:43
2018-11-10	Win	(United Kingdom) Samson Georgestone	Victory Fights 3	Brighton, England	KO (punches)	1	2:23
2018-10-26	Win	(Kurdistan Region) Sami Kerim	Super Fight Series	Sulaymaniyah, Iraq	KO	3	
2018-03-10	Win	(Poland) Pitor Piwesko	Stand and Bang	London, England	TKO (knee to the body)	3	2:55
2017-06-24	Win	(United Kingdom) Jack Rolinski	Fusion FC 24	Surrey, England	Decision (unanimous)	3	3:00
2016-11-26	Loss	(United Kingdom) Jakub Doman	Fusion FC 22	Epsom, England	TKO (right hook)	3	0:35
2016-09-09	Win	(Portugal) Victor Peixoto	Fusion FC 21	Epsom, England	TKO (retirement)	2	
2016-07-17	Win	(United Kingdom) Bobby Fielding	Ronin	London, England	KO (knee)	1	
2016-06-18	Win	(United Kingdom) Leon Ash	Fusion FC 20	Epsom, England	Decision (unanimous)	3	2:00
Legend: Win Loss Draw/no contest Notes
