= Claudio Istrate =

Romanian-Italian kickboxer

- Born: Claudio Istrate; August 20, 1995 (age 31); Dorohoi, Romania
- Other names: Grizzly
- Nationality: Romanian; Italian
- Height: 1.87 m (6 ft 2 in)
- Weight: 109 kg (240 lb; 17.2 st)
- Division: Heavyweight
- Style: Kickboxing, Muay Thai
- Fighting out of: Italy
- Team: Kombat Gym

Kickboxing record
- Total: 91
- Wins: 61
- By knockout: 34
- Losses: 26
- Draws: 3
- No contests: 1

Claudio Istrate (born August 20, 1995) is a Romanian-Italian kickboxer.

== Career ==
On April 25, 2014, Istrate challenged Jérôme Le Banner for his ISKA K-1 World Super heavyweight title. He lost the fight by second round knockout.

On October 24, 2015, Istrate participated in the Venum Victory World Series 95 kg elimination tournament in Panama. He defeated Lucas Alsina by unanimous decision in the semifinals and Rafael Da Souza by technical knockout in the third round to earn a place in the main VVWS tournament. Istrate faced Igor Bugaenko in the semifinals of the main tournament happening on November 28, 2015. He lost by unanimous decision.

On May 14, 2016, Istrate defeated Davide Longoni by decision at La Notte dei Campioni event.

Istrate faced Bas Vorstenbosch in the quarterfinals round of the 2016 A1 World Combat Cup on November 5, 2016. He lost the fight by decision.

Istrate faced Costin Mincu in the opening round of the 2019 Tatneft Cup +80 kg tournament, held on June 11, 2019. He won the fight by first round knockout. Advancing to the tournament quarterfinals, Istrate faced Valeriy Bizyaev on July 19, 2019. He won the fight by decision after scoring a knockdown in the first round.

On October 9, 2021, Istrate took part in a four-man tournament at Road to ONE: Muay Thai Grand Prix. In the semifinals he defeated Jürgen Dolch by first-round knockout with a series of punches. In the final he lost to Rhys Brudenell by first-round knockout.

On February 25, 2023, Istrate faced Niknam Haghparast at Mix Fight Events 52 as the quarterfinal of a Road to ONE tournament. He won the fight by unanimous decision. The semifinals and final of the tournament were scheduled to take place at Evolution FIght on July 29, 2023. In the semifinals Istrate defeated Pavlos Kochliaridis by unanimous decision. In the final he faced Yuri Farcas who stopped him with low kicks in the first round.

On September 10, 2023, Istrate took part in the revived K-1 World Grand Prix for the 30th anniversary of the K-1 promotion at K-1 World GP 2023: ReBOOT～K-1 ReBIRTH～. In the quarterfinals he faced Mahmoud Sattari who he defeated by first round knockout. In the semifinals he defeated Sina Karimian by unanimous decision in a foul riddled bout. He reached the final of the tournament where he faced Liu Ce. He lost the fight by first round knockout due to low kicks.

On June 29, 2024, Istrate took part in the K-1 World GP 2024 in Sarajevo for a chance to qualify for the 2024 K-1 World GP Final. In the quarterfinals he faced Nidal Bchiri, after three rounds the bout was judged a draw and an extension round was announced. Istrate as a protest to the result left the ring, leaving Bchiri the winner by default.

Istrate was invited for a 2024 K-1 World GP Final qualifier bout against Sina Karimian at K-1 World GP 2024 in Osaka on October 5, 2024. The fight ended in the first round after Karimian was declared unable to continue following a blow to the back of the head. After review the bout declared a no contest according to the rules. Istrate was up on points as he had scored a knockdown before the stoppage and was therefore picked as the qualified fighter for the upcoming K-1 World Grand Prix 2024 Final.

== Titles and accomplishments ==
- International Sport Karate Association
  - 2018 ISKA K-1 European Heavyweight (-100 kg) Champion
- K-1
  - 2023 K-1 30th Anniversary Openweight Tournament runner-up
- Italian Muay Thai Federation
  - 2012 Italian National Muay Thai -85 kg Champion

== Fight record ==
Kickboxing record
61 wins (34 (T)KOs), 26 losses, 3 draws, 1 no contest
Date	Result	Opponent	Event	Location	Method	Round	Time
2026-12-29		(Japan) Mikio Ueda	K-1 World MAX 2026 - World Championship Tournament Final	Yokohama, Japan			
2026-04-11	Loss	(Brazil) Ariel Machado	K-1 Genki 2026	Tokyo, Japan	KO (low kick)	2	1:42
For the K-1 WORLD GP Heavyweight Championship.
2026-02-08	Win	(Senegal) Babacar Thiatou Yoff	K-1 World GP 2026 -90kg World Tournament	Tokyo, Japan	KO (left hook)	1	0:27
2025-06-07	Loss	(Italy) Mattia Faraoni	Oktagon: Valle D'Aosta	Courmayeur, Italy	DQ (hit to the back of the head)	1	
For the vacant ISKA Oriental rules World Super-heavyweight (+100kg) title.
2024-12-14	Loss	(Japan) Shota Yamaguchi	K-1 World Grand Prix 2024 Final, Quarterfinals	Tokyo, Japan	DQ (hit to the back of the head)	1	
2024-10-05	NC	(Iran) Sina Karimian	K-1 World GP 2024 in Osaka	Osaka, Japan	Doctor stoppage	1	
Karimian unable to continue after a hit to the back of the head. Istrate was ahead on points at the time of the stoppage and qualified for the K-1 World Grand Prix 2024 Final.
2024-06-29	Loss	(Morocco) Nidal Bchiri	K-1 World GP 2024 in Sarajevo, Quarterfinals	Sarajevo, Bosnia and Herzegovina	retirement (left the ring)	3	3:00
2023-09-10	Loss	(China) Liu Ce	K-1 World GP 2023: ReBOOT～K-1 ReBIRTH～, Tournament Final	Yokohama, Japan	KO (low kicks)	1	0:45
For the 2023 K-1 30th Anniversary Openweight Grand Prix title.
2023-09-10	Win	(Iran) Sina Karimian	K-1 World GP 2023: ReBOOT～K-1 ReBIRTH～, Tournament Semifinals	Yokohama, Japan	Decision (unanimous)	3	3:00
2023-09-10	Win	(Iran) Mahmoud Sattari	K-1 World GP 2023: ReBOOT～K-1 ReBIRTH～, Tournament Quarterfinals	Yokohama, Japan	KO (right hook)	1	2:19
2023-07-29	Loss	(Italy) Yuri Farcaș	Evolution Fight - Road to ONE Tournament, Final	Rosolini, Italy	KO (low kicks)	1	
2023-07-29	Win	(Greece) Pavlos Kochliaridis	Evolution Fight - Road to ONE Tournament, Semifinals	Rosolini, Italy	Decision (unanimous)	3	3:00
2023-02-25	Win	(Iran) Niknam Haghparast	Mix Fight Events 52 - Road to ONE Tournament, Quarterfinals	Yerevan, Armenia	Decision (unanimous)	3	3:00
2023-02-18	Loss	(Portugal) Bruno Suzano	Senshi 15	Varna, Bulgaria	Decision (unanimous)	3	3:00
2021-10-09	Loss	(United Kingdom) Rhys Brudenell	Road to ONE: Muay Thai Grand Prix, Tournament Final	London, England	TKO (punches)	1	2:40
2021-10-09	Win	(Germany) Jürgen Dolch	Road to ONE: Muay Thai Grand Prix, Tournament Semifinals	London, England	KO (punches)	1	0:22
2020-08-28	Loss	(Czech Republic) Tomáš Hron	Yangames Fight Night	Prague, Czech Republic	KO	2	
2019-12-07	Draw	(Moldova) Maxim Bolotov	FEA Kickboxing WGP	Chişinau, Moldova	Ext.R decision	4	3:00
2019-10-04	Loss	(Belarus) Petr Romankevich	2019 Tatneft Cup, +80 kg Tournament Semifinals	Kazan, Russia	KO (low kicks)	2	1:39
2019-08-22	Loss	(Netherlands) Fabio Kwasi	OSS Fighters 04	Mamaia, Romania	TKO (retirement/hand injury)	2	0:43
2019-07-19	Win	(Russia) Valeriy Bizyaev	2019 Tatneft Cup, +80 kg Tournament Quarterfinals	Kazan, Russia	Decision (unanimous)	3	3:00
2019-06-06	Win	(Romania) Ionuț Iancu	Dynamite Fighting Show 4	Cluj-Napoca, Romania	Decision (unanimous)	3	3:00
2019-04-26	Win	(Romania) Costin Mincu	Tatneft Cup, +80 kg Tournament Opening Round	Kazan, Russia	KO (punches)	1	1:50
2018-11-10	Win	(United Kingdom) Kazadi Mwamba	Iron Fighter XX	Pordenone, Italy	Decision (unanimous)	5	3:00
Wins the vacant ISKA K-1 European Heavyweight (-100 kg) title.
2018-10-19	Loss	(Romania) Marius Munteanu	Dynamite Fighting Show 2	Piatra Neamț, Romania	Disqualification	3	1:57
2018-10-06	Loss	(Slovenia) Miran Fabjan	FEA Kickboxing WGP	Chişinau, Moldova	Decision (unanimous)	3	3:00
2018-03-24	Loss	(Czech Republic) Michal Reissinger	Night of Warriors	Liberec, Czech Republic	TKO (retirement/broken hand)	1	3:00
2017-10-27	Loss	(Belarus) Petr Romankevich	Tatneft Cup Semifinals	Kazan, Russia	Ext.R decision	4	3:00
2017-07-27	Loss	(Germany) Mohammad Namivandi	Yangames	Prague, Czech Republic	Ext.R decision	4	3:00
2017-05-27	Win	(Czech Republic) David Vinš	Night of Warriors	Liberec, Czech Republic	KO (punches)	1	
2017-04-08	Win	(Serbia) Milan Dasić	Strong Hill Fight Night 2	Italy	TKO	1	
2016-11-05	Loss	(Netherlands) Bas Vorstenbosch	A1 World Combat Cup, Quarterfinals	Wuppertal, Germany	Decision	3	3:00
2016-09-24	Win	(Netherlands) Dennis Stolzenbach	Germany	Germany	Decision (unanimous)	3	3:00
2016-07-23	Draw	(Serbia) Bojdan Dzepina	East Invasion 2	Trieste, Italy	Decision		
2016-05-14	Win	(Italy) Davide Longoni	La Notte dei Campioni	Seregno, Italy	Decision (unanimous)	3	3:00
2016-02-21	Win	(Slovenia) Marko Bohorč	Iron Fighter	Fiume Veneto, Italy	KO (punches)	2	
2016-01-30	Loss	(Italy) Rafaelle Vitale	Thai Boxing Mania 2016	Torino, Italy	Decision (unanimous)	5	3:00
2015-11-28	Loss	(Belarus) Igor Bugaenko	Venum Victory World Series - Rhino Series 95 kg Tournament, Semifinals	Levallois Perret, France	Decision (unanimous)	3	3:00
2015-10-24	Win	(Brazil) Rafael Da Souza	Venum Victory World Series - Qualifying Tournament, Final	Panama City, Panama	TKO	3	
Qualifies for the Victory World Series Final Tournamaent.
2015-10-24	Win	(Argentina) Lucas Alsina	Venum Victory World Series - Qualifying Tournament, Semifinals	Panama City, Panama	Decision (unanimous)	3	3:00
2015-10-02	Win	(Italy) Gianfranco Bianchi	SuperKombat Final Elimination	Milan, Italy	Decision	3	3:00
2015-08-04	Loss	(Ukraine) Roman Kryklia	Tatneft Cup 2015 Semifinal	Kazan, Russia	TKO (3 knockdowns)	1	1:57
2015-04-25	Loss	(France) Jérôme Le Banner	Final Fight 2	Évreux, France	KO (left knee to the body)	2	0:53
For the ISKA K-1 World Super Heavyweight (+100kg) title.
2015-03-28	Win	(Italy) Andrea Eolini	Fight Clubbing	Lecce, Italy	TKO	1	
2015-01-24	Loss	(Russia) Mikhail Tyuterev	Tatneft Cup 2015 1/8 final	Kazan, Russia	Points	3	3:00
2014-10-25	Draw	(Italy) Andrea Eolini	Fight Clubbing	Pescara, Italy	Decision	3	3:00
2014	Win		Kickboxing Event		KO		
2014-05-24	Win	(Italy) Ivan Dailji	Gorizia Fight Night 2	Italy	KO	1	
2014-05-10	Win	(Italy) Alessandro Lamonica	La Notte dei Campioni	Italy	KO	1	
2014	Win		Muaythai Fight				
2014	Win		Muay Thai		TKO		
2013	Win		Kickboxing Event		KO		
2013-07-13	Loss	(Italy) Giorgio Galasso	Best of the Best 11	Jesolo, Italy	TKO (doctor stoppage)	3	
2013-05-17	Loss	(France) Yassine Ahaggan	Impacts Fight Night 3	Bordeaux, France	Decision	3	3:00
2013	Win		Muay Thai Event		KO		
2012-11-17	Win	(Italy) Francesco Demontis	Mondiale 2012 Iron Fighter	Pordenone, Italy	Decision		
Wins the Italian National Muay Thai (-85kg) title.
2012-10-20	Loss	(Switzerland) Joel Ritschard	Roschtigrabe Derby	Uetendorf, Switzerland	Decision		
2011-11-26	Win	(Moldova) Veaceslav Frăsineac	Iron Fighter	Zoppola, Italy	Decision	3	3:00
Legend: Win Loss Draw/no contest Notes

== Ganryujima ==
Ganryujima special kickboxing rules

Kickboxing record
0 wins, 1 losses
Date	Result	Opponent	Event	Location	Method	Round	Time
2024-09-07	Loss	(Japan) Daichi Henry Mikami	Ganryujima Virtual Fight 2	Japan	Decision (unanimous)	3	3:00
Legend: Win Loss Draw/no contest Notes
