= 2024 in K-1 =

Mixed martial arts events

Information
- First date: March 20, 2024
- Last date: December 14, 2024

Events
- Total events: 9

2024 was the 31st year in the history of the K-1, a global kickboxing promotion. The year started with the K-1 World MAX 2024 Super Welterweight Final 16.

2024 saw the return of K-1 World MAX events and international K-1 World Grand Prix tournament qualifiers.

== List of events ==
#	Event title	Date	Arena	Location
1	K-1 World MAX 2024 - World Tournament Opening Round	March 20, 2024	Yoyogi National Gymnasium	Tokyo, Japan
2	K-1 Fighting Network Romania 2024	June 13, 2024	Galați Ice Rink	Galați, Romania
3	K-1 World GP 2024 in Sarajevo	June 29, 2024	Sports Hall Skenderija	Sarajevo, Bosnia and Herzegovina
4	K-1 World MAX 2024 - World Championship Tournament Final	July 7, 2024	Yoyogi 2nd Gymnasium	Tokyo, Japan
5	K-1 World GP 2024 in Sicily	July 27, 2024	Piazza Garibaldi	Rosolini, Italy
6	K-1 World GP 2024 in Brasília	August 24, 2024	Nilson Nelson Gymnasium	Brasília, Brazil
7	K-1 World MAX 2024	September 29, 2024	Yoyogi 2nd Gymnasium	Tokyo, Japan
8	K-1 World GP 2024 in Osaka	October 5, 2024	Edion Arena	Osaka, Japan
9	K-1 World Grand Prix 2024 Final	December 14, 2024	Yoyogi National Gymnasium	Tokyo, Japan

== K-1 World MAX 2024 - World Tournament Opening Round ==
K-1 WORLD MAX 2024
- Promotion: K-1
- Date: March 20, 2024
- Venue: Yoyogi National Gymnasium
- City: Tokyo, Japan

K-1 World MAX 2024 - World Tournament Opening Round is a kickboxing event that was held by K-1 on March 20, 2024, at the Yoyogi National Gymnasium in Tokyo, Japan.

=== Background ===
This event marked the return of the "MAX" brand, which now includes fights ranging from the Middleweight (-75 kg) to flyweight (-51.5 kg) divisions. 14 Super Welterweight (-70 kg) fighters faced each other to determine the seven contestants for the final one-night tournament on July 7. The event featured two title fights as well as five matchups of RISE and K-1 fighters.

=== Fight card ===
K-1 World MAX 2024
Weight class				Method	Round	Time	Notes
Super Welterweight 70 kg	(Netherlands) Darryl Verdonk	def.	(Japan) Hiromi Wajima	TKO (punches)	1	3:00	K-1 World Max 2024 Final Elimination bout
Super Welterweight 70 kg	(China) Ouyang Feng	def.	(Germany) Pascal Schroth	Decision (unanimous)	3	3:00	K-1 World Max 2024 Final Elimination bout
Super Welterweight 70 kg	(Russia) Viktor Akimov	def.	(Japan) Rei Nakajima	KO (spinning back fist)	2	1:45	K-1 World Max 2024 Final Elimination bout
Cruiserweight 90 kg	(China) Liu Ce	def.	(Iran) Sina Karimian (c)	KO (right hook)	3	2:03	For the K-1 Cruiserweight title
W.Flyweight 52 kg	(Japan) SAHO	def.	(Greece) Antonia Prifti (c)	Decision (unanimous)	3	3:00	For the K-1 Women's Flyweight title
Super Welterweight 70 kg	(Poland) Kacper Muszyński	def.	(Bulgaria) Stoyan Koprivlenski	Decision (unanimous)	3	3:00	K-1 World Max 2024 Final Elimination bout
Super Welterweight 70 kg	(Armenia) Zhora Akopyan	def.	(Ukraine) Taras Hnatchuk	Decision (unanimous)	3	3:00	K-1 World Max 2024 Final Elimination bout
Super Welterweight 70 kg	(Suriname) Romano Bakboord	def.	(Thailand) Thananchai Sitsongpeenong	Ext.R decision (split)	4	3:00	K-1 World Max 2024 Final Elimination bout
Super Welterweight 70 kg	(Brazil) Dengue Silva	def.	(Japan) Riku	TKO (doctor stoppage)	1	1:57	K-1 World Max 2024 Final Elimination bout
Intermission
Featherweight 57.5 kg	(Japan) Taito Gunji	def.	(Japan) Keisuke Monguchi	Ext.R decision (split)	4	3:00	K-1 vs RISE.
W.Catchweight 45.5 kg	(Japan) Koyuki Miyazaki	def.	(Japan) Miyuu Sugawara	Ext.R decision (unanimous)	4	3:00	K-1 vs RISE.
Super Featherweight 60 kg	(Japan) Yuki Egawa	def.	(Japan) Hyuma Hitachi	Ext.R decision (split)	4	3:00	K-1 vs RISE.
Featherweight 57.5 kg	(Japan) Shoki Kaneda	def.	(Japan) Daiki Toita	TKO (punches)	2	2:13	K-1 vs RISE
Super Featherweight 60 kg	(Japan) Yuta Matsuyama	def.	(Japan) Andrei Haraguchi	Decision (unanimous)	3	3:00	K-1 vs RISE
Intermission
Super Lightweight 65 kg	(Japan) Hayato Suzuki	def.	(Japan) Koya Urabe	Decision (unanimous)	3	3:00	
Catchweight 56 kg	(Japan) Masashi Kumura	def.	(Italy) Luca Cecchetti	Decision (majority)	3	3:00	
Super Featherweight 60 kg	(Japan) Hirotaka Asahisa	def.	(France) Rémi Parra	Decision (unanimous)	3	3:00	
Welterweight 67.5 kg	(Canada) Meison Hide Usami	def.	(Japan) Yasuhito Shirasu	KO (right hook)	1	2:37	
W.Catchweight 47.5 kg	(Japan) Panchan Rina	def.	(Japan) Koto Hiraoka	Decision (majority)	3	3:00	
Super Heavyweight +100 kg	(South Korea) Kwon Jangwon	def.	(Japan) Yusuke Ando	KO (right hook)	1	1:47	
Catchweight 64 kg	(Japan) Fumiya Osawa	def.	(Japan) Yutaka	Decision (unanimous)	3	3:00	
Bantamweight 53 kg	(Japan) Rui Okubo	def.	(Japan) Kazuki Miburo	Decision (unanimous)	3	3:00	
Preliminary card
Catchweight 95 kg	(Japan) Daichi Kimura	def.	(Japan) Yu Fujikura	Decision (unanimous)	3	3:00	
Super Bantamweight 55 kg	(Japan) Kengo Murata	def.	(Japan) Takumi Shima	TKO (punches)	1	0:52	
Lightweight 62.5 kg	(Japan) Kuto Ueno	def.	(Japan) Ryunosuke	Decision (unanimous)	3	3:00	

== K-1 Fighting Network Romania 2024 ==
K-1 Fighting Network Romania 2024
- Promotion: K-1; Golden Fighter Championship
- Date: June 13, 2024
- Venue: Galați Ice Rink
- City: Galați, Romania
- Attendance: 6,000 (by Warrior Code)

K-1 Fighting Network Romania 2024 is a kickboxing event that was held in co-promotion by K-1 and Golden Fighter Championship on June 13, 2024, in Galați, Romania.

Carlos Kikuta, Remy Bonjasky, and Ionuț Iftimoaie made special guest appearances at the event.

=== Background ===
This was the fifth K-1 event hosted in Romania, after K-1 Fighting Network Romania 2007, K-1 World Grand Prix 2010 in Bucharest and the two K-1 ColliZion events from 2009.

=== Fight card ===
Main card
Weight class				Method	Round	Time	Notes
Super Heavyweight +100 kg	(Netherlands) Errol Zimmerman	def.	(Greece) Michail Karamousketas	KO (low kicks)	1	1:43	
Light Heavyweight 93 kg	(Netherlands) Leandro Dikmoet	def.	(Philippines) Akira Jr.	TKO (referee stoppage/punches)	2	0:32	For the inaugural K-1 Fighting Network Light Heavyweight Championship
Lightweight 67 kg	(Romania) Adrian Maxim	vs.	(Ukraine) Serhii Adamchuk	No contest (accidental headbutt)	1	2:47	
Lightweight 71 kg	(Romania) Marian Lăpușneanu	def.	(China) Yeshi Shitsetsang	TKO (three knockdowns)	1	1:37	
Lightweight 70 kg	(Romania) Valentin Mavrodin	def.	(Netherlands) Joey Klijenburg	TKO (punches and knee)	1	2:37	
Middleweight 81 kg	(Romania) Alex Filip	def.	(Italy) Alessio Raciti	Decision (unanimous)	3	3:00	
Women's Lightweight 60 kg	(Romania) Andreea Cebuc	def.	(Italy) Marta Costa	Decision (unanimous)	3	3:00	
Middleweight 75 kg	(Romania) Ștefan Orza	def.	(Greece) Dionisis Serifi	KO (punches)	1	2:12	
Middleweight 80 kg	(Romania) Alexandru Amariței	def.	(Romania) Eduard Gafencu	TKO (leg injury)	1	2:58	
Lightweight 73 kg	(Romania) Mădălin Crăciunică	def.	(Romania) Ovidiu Mereț	TKO (three knockdowns)	3	1:47	

== K-1 World GP 2024 in Sarajevo ==
K-1 World GP 2024 in Sarajevo
- Promotion: K-1; No Limit Fighting Network
- Date: June 29, 2024
- Venue: Sports Hall Skanderia
- City: Sarajevo, Bosnia and Herzegovina

K-1 World GP 2024 in Sarajevo - Eastern European Round is a kickboxing event that was held in co-promotion by K-1 and No Limit Fighting Network on June 29, 2024, in Sarajevo, Bosnia and Herzegovina.

=== Background ===
This event marked the return of the K-1 world qualifier events. Supervised by local promotor and former K-1 competitor Dževad Poturak, the event had eight heavyweight kickboxers facing each other in a one-night tournament to earn a spot on the K-1 World GP 2024 Final tournament on December 14, 2024.

=== K-1 World GP 2024 Eastern European Qualification Tournament bracket ===
Quarter-finals
(Turkey) Kadir Yildirim	UD
(Czech Republic) Tomáš Hron	3
(Italy) Claudio Istrate	3
(Morocco) Nidal Bchiri	TKO
(Hungary) Bálint Ladover	3
(Montenegro) Miroslav Vujović	UD
(Slovakia) Ivan Bartek	3
(Bosnia and Herzegovina) Danilo Tošić	UD

Semi-finals
(Turkey) Kadir Yildirim	SD
(Morocco) Nidal Bchiri	3
(Serbia) Miloš Cvjetićanin^{1}	TKO
(Bosnia and Herzegovina) Danilo Tošić	1

Final
(Morocco) Nidal Bchiri^{2}	2
(Serbia) Miloš Cvjetićanin	TKO

^{1}Miroslav Vujović withdrew from the semifinal due to injury and was subsequently replaced by reservist Miloš Cvjetićanin.

^{2}Kadir Yildirim withdrew from the final due to injury and was subsequently replaced by the losing semifinalist Nidal Bchiri.

=== Fight card ===
K-1 World GP 2024 in Sarajevo
Weight class				Method	Round	Time	Notes
Openweight	(Serbia) Miloš Cvjetićanin	def.	(Morocco) Nidal Bchiri	TKO (low kicks)	2	2:03	K-1 World GP 2024 Eastern Europe Qualifier Tournament Final
90kg	(Bosnia and Herzegovina) Mesud Selimović	def.	(Luxembourg) Ernest Dupljak	Decision (unanimous)	3	3:00	
80kg	(Montenegro) Mihailo Ćulafić	def.	(Bosnia and Herzegovina) Haris Biber	Decision (unanimous)	3	3:00	
Openweight	(Serbia) Miloš Cvjetićanin	def.	(Bosnia and Herzegovina) Danilo Tošić	TKO (retirement)	1	3:00	K-1 World GP 2024 Eastern Europe Qualifier Tournament Semifinal
Openweight	(Turkey) Kadir Yildirim	def.	(Morocco) Nidal Bchiri	Decision (split)	3	3:00	K-1 World GP 2024 Eastern Europe Qualifier Tournament Semifinal
73kg	(Croatia) Teo Mikelić	def.	(Suriname) Jahfaro Gezius	Decision (split)	3	3:00	
90kg	(Bosnia and Herzegovina) Albert Ugrinčić	def.	(Turkey) Arslan Ferhat	TKO (injury)	1	3:00	
88kg	(Bosnia and Herzegovina) Benjamin Poturak	def.	(Montenegro) Matija Drobnjak	Decision (unanimous)	3	3:00	
Openweight	(Bosnia and Herzegovina) Danilo Tošić	def.	(Slovakia) Ivan Bartek	Decision (unanimous)	3	3:00	K-1 World GP 2024 Eastern Europe Qualifier Tournament Quarterfinal
Openweight	(Montenegro) Miroslav Vujović	def.	(Hungary) Bálint Ladover	Decision (unanimous)	3	3:00	K-1 World GP 2024 Eastern Europe Qualifier Tournament Quarterfinal
Openweight	(Morocco) Nidal Bchiri	def.	(Italy) Claudio Istrate	TKO (retirement)	3	3:00	K-1 World GP 2024 Eastern Europe Qualifier Tournament Quarterfinal
Openweight	(Turkey) Kadir Yildirim	def.	(Czech Republic) Tomáš Hron	Decision (unanimous)	3	3:00	K-1 World GP 2024 Eastern Europe Qualifier Tournament Quarterfinal
Openweight	(Serbia) Miloš Cvjetićanin	def.	(Bosnia and Herzegovina) Muamer Jugović	TKO (doctor stoppage)	1	1:20	K-1 World GP 2024 Eastern Europe Qualifier Tournament Reserve
Preliminary card
86kg	(Greece) Savvas Kagkelidis	def.	(Montenegro) Lazar Klikovac	Decision	3	3:00	
	(Netherlands) Marieke Calis	def.	(Serbia) Barbara Fiala	TKO (3 knockdowns)	1	2:45	
Youth 56kg	(Bosnia and Herzegovina) Isa Zildžić	def.	(Bosnia and Herzegovina) Nikola Ilić	TKO (referee stoppage)	1	1:24	

== K-1 World MAX 2024 - World Championship Tournament Final ==
K-1 WORLD MAX 2024
- Promotion: K-1
- Date: July 7, 2024
- Venue: Yoyogi 2nd Gymnasium
- City: Tokyo, Japan

K-1 World MAX 2024 - World Championship Tournament Final is a kickboxing event that was held by K-1 on July 7, 2024, in Tokyo, Japan.

=== Background ===
The tournament final of the 2024 K-1 World MAX was held at the event, with the quarterfinals, semifinals and finals all taking place during the evening. K-1 champion Ouyang Feng was scheduled to face Buakaw Banchamek in the quarterfinals, but had to withdraw due to a rib fracture.

==== K-1 World MAX 2024 Tournament Final bracket ====
Final Elimination (2024-03-20)
(China) Ouyang Feng	UD
(Germany) Pascal Schroth	3
(Japan) Hiromi Wajima	1
(Netherlands) Darryl Verdonk	TKO
(Brazil) Dengue Silva	TKO
(Japan) Riku	1
(Russia) Viktor Akimov	KO
(Japan) Rei Nakajima	2
(Suriname) Romano Bakboord	SD
(Thailand) Thananchai Sitsongpeenong	4
(Armenia) Zhora Akopyan	UD
(Ukraine) Taras Hnatchuk	3
(Poland) Kacper Muszyński	UD
(Bulgaria) Stoyan Koprivlenski	3

Quarterfinals
(Bulgaria) Stoyan Koprivlenski^{1}	UD
(Thailand) Buakaw Banchamek^{3}	3
(Brazil) Dengue Silva	UD
(Netherlands) Darryl Verdonk	3
(Russia) Viktor Akimov	KO
(Suriname) Romano Bakboord	2
(Poland) Kacper Muszyński	UD
(Armenia) Zhora Akopyan	3

Semifinals
(Bulgaria) Stoyan Koprivlenski	UD
(Brazil) Dengue Silva	3
(Russia) Viktor Akimov	TKO
(Spain) Sergio Sanchez^{2}	3

Final
(Bulgaria) Stoyan Koprivlenski	KO
(Russia) Viktor Akimov	1

^{1} Ouyang Feng could not participate in the tournament due to injury and was subsequently replaced by Stoyan Koprivlenski.
^{2} Kacper Muszyński withdrew from the tournament due to injury and was replaced by reservist Sergio Sanchez.
^{3} Wildcard

=== Fight card ===
K-1 World MAX 2024 Final
Weight class				Method	Round	Time	Notes
Super Welterweight 70 kg	(Bulgaria) Stoyan Koprivlenski	def.	(Russia) Viktor Akimov	TKO (punches)	1	2:07	2024 K-1 World MAX -70 kg Tournament Final
Catchweight 63.5 kg	(Japan) Yuki Yoza	def.	(Thailand) Kongnapa Weerasakreck	TKO (3 knockdowns)	1	2:30	
Catchweight 80 kg	(Japan) Shintaro Matsukura	def.	(Romania) Alexandru Amariței	Decision (unanimous)	3	3:00	
Super Welterweight 70 kg	(Russia) Viktor Akimov	def.	(Spain) Sergio Sanchez	TKO (leg kick)	3	1:33	2024 K-1 World MAX -70 kg Tournament Semifinals
Super Welterweight 70 kg	(Bulgaria) Stoyan Koprivlenski	def.	(Brazil) Dengue Silva	Decision (unanimous)	3	3:00	2024 K-1 World MAX -70 kg Tournament Semifinals
Super Bantamweight 55 kg	(Japan) Akihiro Kaneko	def.	(Cambodia) Kan Meng Hong	KO (punches)	3	0:55	55 kg World Tournament Quarter Finals
Super Bantamweight 55 kg	(Japan) Masashi Kumura	def.	(Spain) Antonio Orden	KO (left hook)	1	0:55	55 kg World Tournament Quarter Finals
Super Bantamweight 55 kg	(Japan) Riamu	def.	(Greece) Angelos Martinos	TKO (leg kicks and body kicks)	4	0:39	55 kg World Tournament Quarter Finals
Super Bantamweight 55 kg	(Japan) Rui Okubo	def.	(China) Zhao Zhengdong	Decision (unanimous)	3	3:00	55 kg World Tournament Quarter Finals
Super Welterweight 70 kg	(Poland) Kacper Muszyński	def.	(Armenia) Zhora Akopyan	Decision (unanimous)	3	3:00	2024 K-1 World MAX -70 kg Tournament Quarterfinals
Super Welterweight 70 kg	(Russia) Viktor Akimov	def.	(Suriname) Romano Bakboord	KO (punch to the body)	2	0:07	2024 K-1 World MAX -70 kg Tournament Quarterfinals
Super Welterweight 70 kg	(Brazil) Dengue Silva	def.	(Netherlands) Darryl Verdonk	Decision (unanimous)	3	3:00	2024 K-1 World MAX -70 kg Tournament Quarterfinals
Super Welterweight 70 kg	(Bulgaria) Stoyan Koprivlenski	def.	(Thailand) Buakaw Banchamek	Decision (unanimous)	3	3:00	2024 K-1 World MAX -70 kg Tournament Quarterfinals
Super Welterweight 70 kg	(Spain) Sergio Sanchez	def.	(Brazil) Petros Cabelinho	KO (right overhand)	2	2:25	2024 K-1 World MAX -70 kg Tournament Reserve
Super Featherweight 60 kg	(Japan) Tomoya Yokoyama	def.	(Brazil) Cabelo Monteiro	TKO (3 knockdowns)	1	1:47	
Featherweight 57.5 kg	(Japan) Takumi Terada	def.	(Japan) Shoki Kaneda	Decision (majority)	3	3:00	
Super Featherweight 60 kg	(Japan) Yuta Matsuyama	def.	(Japan) Naoki Yamamoto	TKO (knee + punches)	2	2:07	
Women Atomweight 45 kg	(Japan) Kira Matsutani	def.	(South Korea) Jung Yujung	Decision (unanimous)	3	3:00	
Super Bantamweight 55 kg	(Japan) Koji Ikeda	def.	(Japan) Koki	TKO (punches)	2	2:05	
Preliminary card
Lightweight 62.5 kg	(Japan) Kosei Kawakita	def.	(Japan) Kuto Ueno	KO (punches)	1	2:06	
Super Bantawmeight 55 kg	(Japan) Haruto	def.	(Japan) Ryuto Uchida	Decision (unanimous)	3	3:00	
Cruiserweight 90 kg	(Japan) Yu Fujikura	def.	(Japan) Nikudango	Decision (unanimous)	3	3:00	
Super Featherweight 60 kg	(Japan) Kanata Ueno	def.	(Japan) Issei Uegaito	KO (jumping knee)	2	1:48	

== K-1 World GP 2024 in Sicily ==
K-1 World GP 2024 in Sicily
- Promotion: K-1; Evolution Fight
- Date: July 27, 2024
- Venue: Piazza Garibaldi
- City: Rosolini, Sicily, Italy

K-1 World GP 2024 in Sicily - Western European Round is a kickboxing event that was held in co-promotion by K-1 and Evolution Fight on July 27, 2024, in Rosolini, Italy.

=== K-1 World GP 2024 Western European Qualification Tournament bracket ===
Quarter-finals
(Greece) Pavlos Kochliaridis	2
(United Kingdom) Rhys Brudenell	KO
(Hungary) Marcell Horvath	3
(Italy) Samuele Pugliese	UD
(Italy) Agatino La Rosa	1
(Romania) Florin Ivanoiae	KO
(France) Malang Konta	KO
(Switzerland) Ali Badawi	2

Semi-finals
(United Kingdom) Rhys Brudenell	TKO
(Italy) Samuele Pugliese	1
(Romania) Florin Ivănoaie	UD
(France) Malang Konta	4

Final
(United Kingdom) Rhys Brudenell	KO
(Romania) Florin Ivănoaie	2

=== Fight card ===
K-1 World GP 2024 in Sicily
Weight class				Method	Round	Time	Notes
57 kg	(Italy) Giuseppe Gennuso (c)	def.	(Morocco) Mohammed El Haboudi	Decision (unanimous)	5	3:00	For the WKU Muay Thai World -57kg title
Openweight	(United Kingdom) Rhys Brudenell	def.	(Romania) Florin Ivănoaie	KO (left hook)	2	0:46	K-1 World GP 2024 in Sicily Tournament Final
75 kg	(Italy) Enrico Carrara	def.	(France) Badreiddine Bahi	TKO	1	2:48	For the ISKA Muay Thai Intercontinental title
55 kg	(France) Elodie Mabire	def.	(Italy) Luciana Germano	Decision (unanimous)	5	3:00	For the ISKA K-1 World 55 kg title
Openweight	(Romania) Florin Ivănoaie	def.	(France) Malang Konta	Ext.R decision (unanimous)	4	3:00	K-1 World GP 2024 in Sicily Tournament Semifinal
Openweight	(United Kingdom) Rhys Brudenell	def.	(Italy) Samuele Pugliese	TKO (2 knockdowns)	1	0:32	K-1 World GP 2024 in Sicily Tournament Semifinal
67 kg	(Malta) Ryan Cachia	def.	(Italy) Giuliano Vernuccio	Decision (majority)	3	2:00	
70 kg	(Italy) Gianbattista Di Pietro	def.	(Italy) Luca Cappello	TKO (3 knockdowns)	1	1:53	
Openweight	(France) Malang Konta	def.	(Switzerland) Ali Badawi	KO (high kick)	2	3:00	K-1 World GP 2024 in Sicily Tournament Quarterfinal
Openweight	(Romania) Florin Ivănoaie	def.	(Italy) Agatino La Rosa	KO (punches)	1	2:02	K-1 World GP 2024 in Sicily Tournament Quarterfinal
Openweight	(Italy) Samuele Pugliese	def.	(Hungary) Marcell Horvath	Decision (unanimous)	3	3:00	K-1 World GP 2024 in Sicily Tournament Quarterfinal
Openweight	(United Kingdom) Rhys Brudenell	def.	(Greece) Pavlos Kochliaridis	KO (left hook)	2	0:57	K-1 World GP 2024 in Sicily Tournament Quarterfinal
Preliminary card
60 kg	(Italy) Walter Trombadore	def.	(Malta) Kaiden Camilleri	Decision (unanimous)			Youth bout

== K-1 World GP 2024 in Brasília ==
K-1 World GP 2024 in Brasília
- Promotion: K-1; WGP Kickboxing
- Date: August 24, 2024
- Venue: Nilson Nelson Gymnasium
- City: Brasília, Brazil

K-1 World GP 2024 in Brasília - South American Round is a kickboxing event that was held in co-promotion by K-1 and WGP Kickboxing on August 24, 2024, in Brasília, Brazil.

=== Background ===
This event in Brasilia was co-promoted with WGP Kickboxing, in partnership with the Brazilian ministry of sports. It was part of a fight week including two professional events as well as seminars. The K-1 event featured an eight-man Grand Prix with a spot for the winner in the upcoming year-end Grand Prix in Tokyo.

=== K-1 World GP 2024 South American Qualification Tournament bracket ===
Quarter-finals
(Brazil) Ariel Machado	TKO
(Brazil) Abner Ferreira	2
(Brazil) Guto Inocente	KO
(Brazil) Jefferson Salviano	1
(Brazil) Haime Morais	3
(Brazil) Wesley Cottas	UD
(Brazil) Anderson Silva	SD
(Brazil) Jhonny Klever	3

Semi-finals
(Brazil) Ariel Machado	UD
(Brazil) Guto Inocente	3
(Brazil) Wesley Cottas	3
(Brazil) Anderson Silva	UD

Final
(Brazil) Ariel Machado	TKO
(Brazil) Jhonny Klever^{1}	3

^{1} Anderson Silva withdrew from the final due to injury and was subsequently replaced by Jhonny Klever, as losing semifinalist Wesley Cottas was also injured.

=== Fight card ===
K-1 World GP 2024 in Brasília
Weight class				Method	Round	Time	Notes
Openweight	(Brazil) Ariel Machado	def.	(Brazil) Jhonny Klever	TKO (low kicks)	3	1:40	K-1 World GP 2024 in Brasília Tournament Final
71.8 kg	(Brazil) Petros Cabelinho (c)	def.	(Brazil) André Martins	TKO (retirement/low kick)	3	1:20	For the WGP Kickboxing 71.8 kg title
60 kg	(Paraguay) Teodoro Ruiz	def.	(Brazil) Cabelo Monteiro	Decision (split)	3	3:00	
Openweight	(Brazil) Anderson Silva	def.	(Brazil) Wesley Cottas	Decision (unanimous)	3	3:00	K-1 World GP 2024 in Brasília Tournament Semifinal
Openweight	(Brazil) Ariel Machado	def.	(Brazil) Guto Inocente	Decision (unanimous)	3	3:00	K-1 World GP 2024 in Brasília Tournament Semifinal
Catchweight	(Argentina) Facu Suarez	def.	(Bolivia) Renzo Martinez	Decision (unanimous)	3	3:00	Martinez came in 2.7kg over the 60kg limit and was deducted 2 points
Openweight	(Brazil) Anderson Silva	def.	(Brazil) Jhonny Klever	Decision (split)	3	3:00	K-1 World GP 2024 in Brasília Tournament Quarterfinal
Openweight	(Brazil) Wesley Cottas	def.	(Brazil) Haime Morais	Decision (unanimous)	3	3:00	K-1 World GP 2024 in Brasília Tournament Quarterfinal
Openweight	(Brazil) Guto Inocente	def.	(Brazil) Jefferson Salviano	KO (front kick)	1	0:59	K-1 World GP 2024 in Brasília Tournament Quarterfinal
Openweight	(Brazil) Ariel Machado	def.	(Brazil) Abner Ferreira	TKO (2 knockdowns/low kick)	2	1:40	K-1 World GP 2024 in Brasília Tournament Quarterfinal
Preliminary card
78.1 kg	(Brazil) Marcos Carvalho	def.	(Brazil) Lucas Rafael	TKO (doctor stoppage)	1	3:00	
64.5 kg	(Netherlands) Sakvan Arab	def.	(Brazil) Bruno Perna	TKO (3 knockdowns)	2	2:37	
78.1 kg	(Brazil) Cicero Evangelista	def.	(Brazil) Edson Pânico	Decision (majority)	3	3:00	
53 kg	(Brazil) Lany Silva	def.	(Argentina) Lucia Apdelgarim	Decision (split)	3	3:00	

== K-1 World MAX 2024 ==
K-1 World MAX 2024
- Promotion: K-1
- Date: September 29, 2024
- Venue: Yoyogi 2nd Gymnasium
- City: Tokyo, Japan

K-1 World MAX 2024 is a kickboxing event that was held by K-1 on September 29, 2024, in Tokyo, Japan.

=== Background ===
A K-1 Cruiserweight (-90kg) title bout between champion Liu Ce and challenger Mahmoud Sattari, a K-1 Featherweight title bout between champion Taito Gunji and challenger Takumi Terada, and the semifinal bouts of the K-1 super bantamweight tournament all took place during the event.

=== 2024 K-1 -55kg World Tournament bracket ===
Quarterfinals (2024-07-07) K-1 World MAX 2024
(Japan) Rui Okubo	UD
(China) Zhao Zhengdong	3
(Japan) Masashi Kumura	KO
(Spain) Antonio Orden	1
(Japan) Riamu	TKO
(Greece) Angelos Martinos	4
(Japan) Akihiro Kaneko	KO
(Cambodia) Kan Meng Hong	3

Semifinals
(Japan) Rui Okubo	UD
(Japan) Masashi Kumura	3
(Japan) Riamu	3
(Japan) Akihiro Kaneko	MD

Final
(Japan) Akihiro Kaneko	KO
(Japan) Rui Okubo	2

=== K-1 Super Lightweight Championship Tournament bracket ===
Quarterfinals
(Japan) Hayato Suzuki	3
(Romania) Ionuț Popa	TKO
(Thailand) Yodkhunpon Weerasakreck	TKO
(Turkey) Can Pinar	1
(Italy) Lenny Blasi	3
(Japan) Shu Inagaki	KO
(China) Meng Gaofeng	3
(Argentina) Tomas Aguirre	UD

Semifinals
(Romania) Ionuț Popa	1
(Thailand) Yodkhunpon Weerasakreck	TKO
(Japan) Shu Inagaki	UD
(Argentina) Tomas Aguirre	3

Final
(Thailand) Yodkhunpon Weerasakreck	MD
(Japan) Shu Inagaki	3

=== Fight card ===
K-1 World MAX 2024
Weight class				Method	Round	Time	Notes
Super Bantamweight 55 kg	(Japan) Akihiro Kaneko	def.	(Japan) Rui Okubo	KO (low kick)	2	0:26	55 kg World Tournament Final
Super Lightweight 65 kg	(Thailand) Yodkhunpon Weerasakreck	def.	(Japan) Shu Inagaki	Decision (majority)	3	3:00	Super lightweight Championship Tournament Final
Cruiserweight 90 kg	(China) Liu Ce (c)	def.	(Iran) Mahmoud Sattari	Decision (majority)	3	3:00	For the K-1 Cruiserweight title
Featherweight 57.5 kg	(Japan) Takumi Terada	def.	(Japan) Taito Gunji (c)	Ext.R decision (unanimous)	4	3:00	For the K-1 Featherweight title
Catchweight 63 kg	(Japan) Yuki Yoza	def.	(Thailand) Petchdam Petchyindee Academy	KO (low kicks)	3	1:12	
Koya Urabe retirement ceremony
Catchweight 61.5 kg	(Japan) Chihiro Nakajima	def.	(Japan) Yuta Murakoshi	Decision (unanimous)	3	3:00	
Super Lightweight 65 kg	(Japan) Shu Inagaki	def.	(Argentina) Tomas Aguirre	Decision (unanimous)	3	3:00	Super Lightweight Championship Tournament Semifinal
Super Lightweight 65 kg	(Thailand) Yodkhunpon Weerasakreck	def.	(Romania) Ionuț Popa	TKO (2 knockdowns)	1	1:12	Super Lightweight Championship Tournament Semifinal
Super Bantamweight 55 kg	(Japan) Rui Okubo	def.	(Japan) Masashi Kumura	Decision (unanimous)	3	3:00	55 kg World Tournament Semifinals
Super Bantamweight 55 kg	(Japan) Akihiro Kaneko	def.	(Japan) Riamu	Decision (majority)	3	3:00	55 kg World Tournament Semifinals
Super Bantamweight 55 kg	(Japan) Lyra Nagasaka	def.	(Japan) Koji Ikeda	TKO (2 knockdowns)	1	2:31	55 kg World Tournament Reserve
Super Bantamweight 55 kg	(Japan) Momotaro Kiyama	def.	(Japan) Chikara Iwao	Decision (unanimous)	3	3:00	
Intermission
Super Lightweight 65 kg	(Argentina) Tomas Aguirre	def.	(China) Meng Gaofeng	Decision (unanimous)	3	3:00	Super Lightweight Championship Tournament Quarterfinal
Super Lightweight 65 kg	(Japan) Shu Inagaki	def.	(Italy) Lenny Blasi	KO (flying knee)	3	1:35	Super Lightweight Championship Tournament Quarterfinal
Super Lightweight 65 kg	(Thailand) Yodkhunpon Weerasakreck	def.	(Turkey) Can Pinar	TKO (2 knockdowns)	1	2:50	Super Lightweight Championship Tournament Quarterfinal
Super Lightweight 65 kg	(Romania) Ionuț Popa	def.	(Japan) Hayato Suzuki	TKO (referee stoppage)	3		Super Lightweight Championship Tournament Quarterfinal
Super Lightweight 65 kg	(Japan) Daizo Sasaki	def.	(Japan) Koya Saito	Decision (unanimous)	3	3:00	Super Lightweight Championship Tournament Reserve 1
Super Lightweight 65 kg	(Japan) Hikaru Terashima	def.	(Japan) Ruku	KO (low kicks)	3	2:29	Super Lightweight Championship Tournament Reserve 2
Preliminary card
Super Lightweight 65 kg	(Japan) Yuki Sakamoto	def.	(Japan) Kosuke Kawashima	KO (left hook)	3	3:00	
Super Featherweight 60 kg	(Japan) Kanata Ueno	def.	(Japan) Musashi	KO (left hook)	1	1:28	
Featherweight 57.5 kg	(Japan) Kosei Sekiguchi	def.	(Japan) Kei Ishikawa	TKO (corner stoppage)	3	0:41	
Lightweight 62.5 kg	(Japan) Rui	def.	(Japan) Akihiro Kawagoe	Decision (majority)	3	3:00	
Bantamweight 53 kg	(Japan) Yuto Takiyama	def.	(Japan) Sora Amemiya	Decision (majority)	3	3:00	

== K-1 World GP 2024 in Osaka ==
K-1 World GP 2024 in Osaka
- Promotion: K-1
- Date: October 5, 2024
- Venue: Edion Arena
- City: Osaka, Japan

K-1 World GP 2024 in Osaka - Asian Round is a kickboxing event that was held by K-1 on October 5, 2024, at the Edion Arena in Osaka, Japan.

=== Fight card ===
K-1 World Grand Prix 2024 in Osaka
Weight class				Method	Round	Time	Notes
Openweight	(Japan) K-Jee	def.	(France) Jérôme Le Banner	KO (high kick)	1	1:26	K-1 World GP 2024 Qualifier Asian Round
Openweight	(Netherlands) Errol Zimmerman	def.	(Japan) Shota Yamaguchi	KO (right hook)	3	1:14	K-1 World GP 2024 Qualifier Asian Round
Openweight	(Iran) Sina Karimian	vs.	(Italy) Claudio Istrate	No contest	1		K-1 World GP 2024 Qualifier Asian Round
Openweight	(South Korea) Kwon Jangwon	def.	(Japan) Seiya Tanigawa	Decision (unanimous)	3	3:00	K-1 World GP 2024 Qualifier Asian Round
Super Welterweight 70 kg	(Bulgaria) Stoyan Koprivlenski	def.	(Japan) Jinku Oda	Ext.R decision (split)	4	3:00	
Super Welterweight 70 kg	(Netherlands) Jordann Pikeur	def.	(Brazil) Dengue Silva	Ext.R decision (unanimous)	4	3:00	
Super Welterweight 70 kg	(Japan) Hiromi Wajima	def.	(South Korea) Kim Joon Hwa	KO (knee to the body)	1	1:19	
Super Welterweight 70 kg	(Netherlands) Darryl Verdonk	def.	(Armenia) Zhora Akopyan	Ext.R decision (unanimous)	4	3:00	
Intermission
W.Flyweight 52 kg	(Japan) SAHO	def.	(Turkey) Erivan Barut	Decision (unanimous)	3	3:00	
Super Lightweight 65 kg	(Japan) Kensei Kondo	def.	(Japan) Kenta Hayashi	TKO (3 knockdowns)	2	1:36	
Featherweight 57.5 kg	(Japan) Shoki Kaneda	def.	(Japan) Toma	KO (left hook)	1	1:11	
Featherweight 57.5 kg	(Japan) Shuhei Kumura	def.	(Japan) Tatsuya Tsubakihara	Decision (split)	3	3:00	
Featherweight 57.5 kg	(Japan) Haruto Matsumoto	def.	(Japan) Ginji	TKO (punches)	2	2:16	
Intermission
Catchweight 95 kg	(Philippines) Akira Jr	def.	(Japan) Shota Takigami	Ext.R decision (unanimous)	4	3:00	
Lightweight 62.5 kg	(Japan) Haru Furumiya	def.	(Japan) Yuto Shinohara	TKO (referee stoppage)	2	2:08	
Super Featherweight 60 kg	(Japan) Naoki Takahashi	def.	(Japan) Ryoga Matsumoto	TKO (punches)	2	1:05	
Catchweight 51 kg	(Japan) Daina	def.	(Japan) Toranosuke Higashi	TKO (doctor stoppage)	3	1:37	
Super bantamweight 55 kg	(Japan) Kengo Murata	def.	(Japan) Yuto Kuroda	TKO (referee stoppage)	2	1:31	
Preliminary card
Super Lightweight 65 kg	(Japan) Kensuke Ori	def.	(Japan) Ryo Kikkawa	KO (high kick + punches)	2	2:59	
Super Bantamweight 55 kg	(Japan) Ryusho	def.	(Japan) Ryoga	KO (right cross)	1	2:15	
Super Featherweight 60 kg	(Japan) Toki Harada	def.	(Japan) Tatsuma	Decision (unanimous)	3	3:00	
Featherweight 57.5 kg	(Japan) Kaito Horii	def.	(Japan) Iwa King	Decision (unanimous)	3	3:00	
Catchweight 51 kg	(Japan) Masato Arai	def.	(Japan) Yusei Yuoke	Decision (unanimous)	3	3:00	

== K-1 World Grand Prix 2024 Final ==
K-1 World Grand Prix 2024 Final
- Promotion: K-1
- Date: December 14, 2024
- Venue: Yoyogi National Gymnasium
- City: Tokyo, Japan

K-1 World Grand Prix 2024 Final is a kickboxing event that was held by K-1 on December 14, 2024, in Tokyo, Japan.

=== K-1 World GP 2024 Final Tournament bracket ===
Quarter-finals
(Japan) Shota Yamaguchi	DQ
(Italy) Claudio Istrate	1
(China) Feng Rui	MD
(Italy) Mattia Faraoni	3
(Brazil) Ariel Machado	KO
(United Kingdom) Rhys Brudenell	1
(Japan) K-Jee	2
(Netherlands) Errol Zimmerman	KO

Semi-finals
(Japan) Shota Yamaguchi	3
(China) Feng Rui	UD
(Brazil) Ariel Machado	TKO
(Netherlands) Errol Zimmerman	2

Final
(China) Feng Rui	1
(Brazil) Ariel Machado	KO

=== Fight card ===
K-1 World Grand Prix 2024 Final
Weight class				Method	Round	Time	Notes
Openweight	(Brazil) Ariel Machado	def.	(China) Feng Rui	KO (left hook)	1	2:55	K-1 World GP 2024 Tournament Final
Catchweight 56 kg	(Japan) Akihiro Kaneko	def.	(Russia) Aslanbek Zikreev	Decision (unanimous)	3	3:00	
Super Bantamweight 55 kg	(Japan) Rui Okubo	def.	(Japan) Riamu	Decision (unanimous)	3	3:00	
Super Welterweight 70 kg	(Japan) Hiromi Wajima	def.	(Bulgaria) Stoyan Koprivlenski	Decision (unanimous)	3	3:00	
Catchweight 71.5 kg	(Poland) Kacper Muszyński	def.	(Romania) Valentin Mavrodin	TKO (referee stoppage)	3	2:08	
Openweight	(Japan) Daichi Kimura	vs.	(Iran) Sina Karimian	No contest (low blow)	1		
Cruiserweight 90 kg	(Netherlands) Thian De Vries	def.	(Japan) RUI	KO (left cross)	1	0:27	
Openweight	(Brazil) Ariel Machado	def.	(Netherlands) Errol Zimmerman	TKO (2 knockdowns/low kicks)	2	2:33	K-1 World GP 2024 Tournament Semifinal
Openweight	(China) Feng Rui	def.	(Japan) Shota Yamaguchi	Decision (unanimous)	3	3:00	K-1 World GP 2024 Tournament Semifinal
Super Featherweight 60 kg	(Japan) Chihiro Nakajima	def.	(Belarus) Daniil Yermolenka	Ext.R decision (unanimous)	4	3:00	
Super Lightweight 65 kg	(Belarus) Danila Kvach	def.	(Japan) Hikaru Terashima	KO (spinning backfist)	1	2:08	
Super Lightweight 65 kg	(Japan) Daizo Sasaki	def.	(Japan) Takuma Tsukamoto	Decision (unanimous)	3	3:00	
Super Bantamweight 55 kg	(Japan) Koji Ikeda	def.	(Japan) Momotaro Kiyama	Decision (unanimous)	3	3:00	
Openweight	(Netherlands) Errol Zimmerman	def.	(Japan) K-Jee	KO (left hook)	2	0:58	K-1 World GP 2024 Tournament Quarterfinal
Openweight	(Brazil) Ariel Machado	def.	(United Kingdom) Rhys Brudenell	KO (right hook)	1	2:35	K-1 World GP 2024 Tournament Quarterfinal
Openweight	(China) Feng Rui	def.	(Italy) Mattia Faraoni	Decision (majority)	3	3:00	K-1 World GP 2024 Tournament Quarterfinal
Openweight	(Japan) Shota Yamaguchi	def.	(Italy) Claudio Istrate	DQ (hit to the back of the head)	1		K-1 World GP 2024 Tournament Quarterfinal
Openweight	(Japan) Seiya Tanigawa	def.	(Japan) Kosuke Jitsukata	TKO (left hook)	1	1:59	K-1 World GP 2024 Tournament Reserve
Preliminary card
Featherweight 57.5 kg	(Japan) Kosei Sekiguchi	def.	(Japan) Takaya Komatsu	KO (left hook)	1	0:15	
Super Featherweight 60 kg	(Japan) Kanata Ueno	def.	(Japan) Sakuya Ueda	KO (spinning back kick)	2	0:05	
Bantamweight 53 kg	(Japan) Taki	def.	(Japan) Ren Ogawa	Decision (majority)	3	3:00	
Lightweight 62.5 kg	(Japan) Rui	draw.	(Japan) Raiki	Decision (majority)	3	3:00	
Super Bantamweight 55 kg	(Japan) Daichi	def.	(Japan) Yukito Iwagami	TKO (punches)	1	1:21	

== See also ==
- 2024 in Glory
- 2024 in ONE Championship
- 2024 in RISE
- 2024 in Romanian kickboxing
- 2024 in Wu Lin Feng
- 2024 in Kunlun Fight
