= Dengue Silva =

Brazilian professional kickboxer

- Born: Raphael Ferreira da Silva; November 6, 1993 (age 33); São Paulo, Brazil
- Other names: Dengue
- Height: 1.90 m (6 ft 3 in)
- Weight: 75 kg (165 lb; 11.8 st)
- Division: Light middleweight Super middleweight
- Style: Kickboxing, Muay Thai
- Stance: Orthodox
- Fighting out of: São Paulo, Brazil
- Team: Squadrão Thai Brasil
- Trainer: Bruno Abbate

Kickboxing record
- Total: 56
- Wins: 49
- By knockout: 26
- Losses: 7
- By knockout: 0
- Draws: 0

Mixed martial arts record
- Total: 1
- Losses: 1

Raphael Ferreira da Silva (born November 6, 1993), also known as Dengue Silva, is a Brazilian kickboxer and Muay Thai fighter.

== Kickboxing and Muay Thai career ==
=== Early career ===
Silva started training in Muay Thai in 2012.

On November 2, 2019, Silva faced Emerson Bolota Maximum Muaythai. He won the fight by decision after five rounds.

=== SFT Combat ===
On November 6, 2021, Silva faced Carlos Prates for the SFT Xtreme Welterweight title. He lost the fight by fifth round knockout with a body punch.

On February 11, 2023, Silva defended his SFT Xtreme Lightweight title against Guilherme Carvalho at SFT 39. He won the fight by second round high kick knockout.

On November 18, 2023 Silva defended his SFT Xtreme Lightweight title against João Carvoeiro at SFT 44. He won the fight by split decision.

=== K-1 ===
Silva made his K-1 debut on March 20, 2024, at K-1 World MAX 2024 - World Tournament Opening Round where he faced Riku in a qualifier bout for the K-1 World MAX 2024 World Championship Final. He won the fight by first round doctor stoppage.

Silva faced Darryl Verdonk in the 2024 K-1 World MAX Championship quarterfinal at K-1 World MAX 2024 - World Championship Tournament Final on July 7, 2024. He won the fight by unanimous decision. Silva faced Stoyan Koprivlenski in the semifinals and was defeated by unanimous decision after receiving an eight count.

On July 26, 2025, Silva challenged Aqil Bukhari for his Krush Middleweight (-75kg) Championship at Krush 178. He won the fight by unanimous decision.

Silva was scheduled to face Kacper Muszyński in a middleweight (-75 kg) bout at K-1 World GP 2026 - 90kg World Tournament on February 8, 2026. He won by first round knockout after suffering a knockdown.

Silva was scheduled to face Alfousseynou Kamara for the vacant K-1 Middleweight (-75kg) title at K-1 Genki 2026 on April 11, 2026.

== Championships and accomplishments ==
- K-1
  - 2026 K-1 Middleweight (-75kg) Champion
- Krush
  - 2025 Krush Middleweight (-75kg) Championship
- Standout Fighting Tournament
  - 2022 SFT Xtreme Lightweight (155 lbs) Championship
    - Three successful title defenses
  - 2020 SFT Xtreme Fighter of the Year
  - 2020 SFT Xtreme Fight of the Year (vs.Cicero Evangelista at SFT 25)
  - 2020 SFT Xtreme Knockout of the Year
- Squadrão Thai
  - 2019 Squadrão Thai Super 8 GP Winner

== Kickboxing and Muay Thai record ==
Professional Muay Thai & Kickboxing record
49 Wins (26 (T)KOs), 7 Losses, 0 Draw
Date	Result	Opponent	Event	Location	Method	Round	Time
2026-12-29		(Suriname) Jahfaro Gezius	K-1 World MAX 2026 - World Championship Tournament Final	Yokohama, Japan			
Defending the K-1 Middleweight (-75kg) Championship.
2026-06-18	Loss	(Moldova) Artiom Livadari	FCE 5	Lisbon, Portugal	Decision (Majority)	3	3:00
2026-04-11	Win	(Senegal) Alfousseynou Kamara	K-1 Genki 2026	Tokyo, Japan	Decision (Unanimous)	3	3:00
Wins the vacant K-1 Middleweight (-75kg) Championship.
2026-02-08	Win	(Poland) Kacper Muszyński	K-1 World GP 2026 -90kg World Tournament	Tokyo, Japan	KO (Punches)	1	2:48
2025-07-26	Win	(Japan) Aqil Bukhari	Krush 178	Tokyo, Japan	Decision (Unanimous)	3	3:00
Wins the Krush Middleweight (-75kg) Championship.
2025-04-12	Win	(Russia) Vasilii Semenov	RCC Fair Fight 30	Yekaterinburg, Russia	KO (Punches)	2	2:13
2025-02-09	Win	(Japan) Jinku Oda	K-1 World MAX 2025	Tokyo, Japan	Decision (Majority)	3	3:00
2024-10-05	Loss	(Curaçao) Jordann Pikeur	K-1 World GP 2024 in Osaka	Osaka, Japan	Ext.R Decision (Unanimous)	4	3:00
2024-07-07	Loss	(Bulgaria) Stoyan Koprivlenski	K-1 World MAX 2024 - World Championship Tournament Final, Semifinals	Tokyo, Japan	Decision (Unanimous)	3	3:00
2024-07-07	Win	(Netherlands) Darryl Verdonk	K-1 World MAX 2024 - World Championship Tournament Final, Quarterfinals	Tokyo, Japan	Decision (Unanimous)	3	3:00
2024-03-20	Win	(Japan) Riku	K-1 World MAX 2024 - World Tournament Opening Round	Tokyo, Japan	TKO (Doctor stoppage)	1	1:57
Qualifies for K-1 World MAX 2024 World Championship Final.
2023-11-18	Win	(Brazil) João Carvoeiro	SFT 44: O Apocalipse dos Guerreiros	São Paulo, Brazil	Decision (Split)	5	3:00
Defends the SFT Xtreme Lightweight (155 lbs) title.
2023-07-08	Win	(Brazil) Wesley Maguila	Attack Fight 28	Porto Alegre, Brazil	KO (Punches)	1	3:00
2023-06-16	Win	(Brazil) Guilherme Carvalho	Centurion FC	São Paulo, Brazil	Decision (Unanimous)	3	3:00
2023-02-11	Win	(Brazil) Guilherme Carvalho	SFT 39	São Paulo, Brazil	KO (High kick)	2	0:21
Defends the SFT Xtreme Lightweight (155 lbs) title.
2022-09-10	Win	(Brazil) Marcos Alves	SFT Xtreme 10	São Paulo, Brazil	KO (Knee to the body)	2	1:34
Defends the SFT Xtreme Lightweight (155 lbs) title.
2022-07-30	Win	(Brazil) Fernando Williams	SFT Xtreme 9	São Paulo, Brazil	KO (Left hook to the body)	1	0:56
Wins the SFT Xtreme Lightweight (155 lbs) title.
2022-03-26	Win	(Brazil) Marcos Alves	SFT Xtreme 6	São Paulo, Brazil	Decision (Majority)	3	3:00
2021-11-06	Loss	(Brazil) Carlos Prates	SFT Xtreme 2	São Paulo, Brazil	KO (Body shot)	5	1:32
For the vacant SFT Xtreme Welterweight (168 lbs) title.
2020-11-21	Win	(Brazil) Cicero Evangelista	SFT 25	São Paulo, Brazil	KO (Punches)	1	2:45
2020-02-29	Win	(Brazil) Newton Fernandes	SFT 21	São Paulo, Brazil	KO (Punches)	1	1:13
2019-11-02	Win	(Brazil) Emerson Bolota	Maximum Muaythai	São Paulo, Brazil	Decision	5	3:00
2019-07-20	Win	(Brazil) Flavio Pardinho	Mix Fight Standing 11	São Paulo, Brazil	KO (Flying knee)	1	
2019-06-08	Win	(Brazil) Luis Cardoso	TF Fight VI	São Paulo, Brazil	TKO (High kick)	1	0:43
2019-05-25	Win	(Brazil) Cicero Evangelista	Copa Squadrão Thai - Super 8 GP, Final	São Paulo, Brazil	Decision (Unanimous)	3	3:00
2019-05-25	Win	(Brazil) Paulo Santos	Copa Squadrão Thai - Super 8 GP, Semifinals	São Paulo, Brazil	TKO (3 Knockdowns)	1	
2019-05-25	Win	(Brazil) Anderson Brucutu	Copa Squadrão Thai - Super 8 GP, Quarterfinals	São Paulo, Brazil	Decision	3	3:00
2019-04-06	Win	(Brazil) Daniel Felipe	WGP Kickboxing #53	São Paulo, Brazil	KO (Right hook)	1	2:03
2018-11-25	Loss	(Brazil) Cris Will Smith	War Muay Thai Fight - 75GP, Final	São Paulo, Brazil	Decision	5	3:00
2018-09-16	Win	(Brazil) Daniel Sobral	War Muay Thai Fight - 75GP, Semifinals	São Paulo, Brazil	Decision	5	3:00
2018-05-20	Win	(Brazil)	War Muay Thai Fight - 75GP, Quarterfinals	São Paulo, Brazil	KO	1	
2018-03-10	Win	(Brazil)	Copa Squadrão Thai	São Paulo, Brazil	TKO	3	
2018-02-23	Win	(Brazil) Manoel Sousa	WGP Kickboxing #44	São Bernardo do Campo, Brazil	Decision	3	3:00
2017-11-25	Win	(Brazil)	Copa Squadrão Thai	São Paulo, Brazil			
2017-10-21	Loss	(Brazil) Oliveira	WGP Kickboxing #41	São Paulo, Brazil	Decision (Split)	3	3:00
2017-07-15	Loss	(Brazil) Jackson Santos	SP Fight	Brazil	Decision	3	3:00
2017-05-06	Win	(Brazil)	4Body Muay Thai Fight 1	São Paulo, Brazil			
2017-03-11	Win	(Brazil) Michel Papa	SP Fight	Brazil			
2016-10-22	Win	(Brazil) Murillo Xavier	Amazing Fight Brazil 2016	São Paulo, Brazil	TKO (Referee stoppage)	2	
2016-04-03	Win	(Brazil) Fabricio Magnoli	Thailand Tiger Fight	São Paulo, Brazil	Decision	3	3:00
2016-03-05	Win	(Brazil) Pedro Roxo	GMTF	Brazil	Decision	3	3:00
Legend: Win Loss Draw/No contest Notes

== Mixed martial arts record ==
Professional record breakdown
1 match	0 wins	1 loss
By decision	0	1

Res.	Record	Opponent	Method	Event	Date	Round	Time	Location	Notes
Loss	0–1	Alain Moreno	Decision (unanimous)	SFT 58	December 13, 2025	3	5:00	São Paulo, Brazil	Welterweight debut.

== See also ==
- List of male kickboxers
