= Ariel Machado =

Brazilian professional kickboxer (born 1987)

- Born: Ariel do Rocio Machado; 15 May 1987 (age 39); Curitiba, Brazil
- Height: 1.84 m (6 ft 1/2 in)
- Weight: 104.0 kg (229.3 lb; 16.38 st)
- Style: Kickboxing
- Stance: Orthodox
- Fighting out of: Curitiba, Brazil
- Team: Hemmers Gym / Madison Team
- Years active: 2006 - present

Kickboxing record
- Total: 77
- Wins: 63
- By knockout: 45
- Losses: 14
- By knockout: 5

Mixed martial arts record
- Total: 10
- Wins: 7
- By knockout: 7
- Losses: 3
- By knockout: 2
- By submission: 1

Other information
- Boxing record from BoxRec
- Mixed martial arts record from Sherdog

Ariel Machado, is a Brazilian kickboxer and mixed martial artist. He is the K-1 World Grand Prix 2024 Final Champion, and the reigning K-1 World Heavyweight Champion.

Combat Press ranked him as a top ten light heavyweight kickboxer in the world between November 2021 and June 2022, with Machado peaking at #7.

== Kickboxing career ==
Machado participated in the WGP Kickboxing 26 tournament, facing Junior Alpha in the semifinals. Machado lost the fight by decision. In his next appearance with WGP Kickboxing, he faced Maycon Silva. Machado won the fight by decision.

He took part in the 2016 Glory Light Heavyweight tournament. In the semifinals, he defeated Pavel Zhuravlev by a unanimous decision. He lost the final bout to Zinedine Hameur-Lain by a second round KO.

Machado next fought in the 2016 Glory Middleweight Contender tournament. He lost the very first bout to Yousri Belgaroui by decision.

Machado was scheduled to fight in the 2017 Glory Light Heavyweight Contender tournament. He won a unanimous decision against Danyo Ilunga in the semi-finals. In the tournament final, he fought a rematch with Zinedine Hameur-Lain, and won by TKO in the first round.

Briefly fighting outside of Glory, Machado was scheduled to face Lucas Alsina during WGP Kickboxing 38. Machado won the bout in the third round, knocking Alsina out with a flying knee.

He fought for the Glory Light Heavyweight title during Glory 47: Lyon, held at the time by Artem Vakhitov. Vakhitov successfully defended the title, winning by unanimous decision.

His next two fights were outside of Glory, which he won by a split decision against Haime Morais during WGP KB 47, and by KO against Marcelo Nuñez during WGP KB 57.

Machado was scheduled to fight Michael Duut during Glory Collision 2. Machado won by unanimous decision.

Machado took part in the K-1 World Grand Prix 2024 Final on December 14, 2024. In the quarterfinals he knocked out Rhys Brudenell in the first round with a hook. In the semifinals he stopped Errol Zimmerman by second round technical knckout with low kicks. In the final he knocked out Feng Rui with a left hook 2 minutes and 55 seconds into the first round.

Machado faced Rio Richardson at K-1 Dontaku on July 13, 2025. He won the fight by a first-round technical knockout.

== Doping suspension ==
On April 20, 2019, it was announced that Machado failed a drug test prior to Glory 47: Lyon in 2017. He was suspended for 20 months following a positive test for banned substances at the event, where he challenged reigning champion Artem Vakhitov.

== Titles and accomplishments ==
- GLORY
  - 2017 Glory Light Heavyweight Contender Tournament Winner
- WGP Kickboxing
  - 2023 WGP Kickboxing Light Heavyweight (-94,1 kg) Champion
- K-1
  - K-1 World GP 2024 in Brasilia Winner
  - K-1 World Grand Prix 2024 Final Winner
  - 2025 K-1 World GP Heavyweight Champion
    - One successful title defense

Awards

- Combat Press
  - 2019 Comeback Fighter of the Year

== Kickboxing and Muay Thai record ==
Professional Muiay Thai and Kickboxing record
63 wins (45 KOs), 14 losses, 0 Draw
| Date | Result | Opponent | Event | Location | Method | Round | Time |
| 2026-12-29 | | (Russia) Maxim Baklanov | K-1 World MAX 2026 - World Championship Tournament Final | Yokohama, Japan | | | |
Defending the K-1 WORLD GP Heavyweight Championship.
| 2026-04-11 | Win | (Italy) Claudio Istrate | K-1 Genki 2026 | Tokyo, Japan | TKO (Low kick) | 2 | 1:42 |
Defends the K-1 WORLD GP Heavyweight Championship.
| 2025-11-15 | Win | (Netherlands) Roel Mannaart | K-1 World MAX 2025 - 70kg World Championship Tournament Final | Tokyo, Japan | TKO (Punches) | 1 | 3:00 |
Wins the K-1 WORLD GP Heavyweight Championship.
| 2025-07-13 | Win | (Netherlands) Rio Richardson | K-1 Dontaku | Fukuoka, Japan | TKO (3 Knockdowns/low kicks) | 1 | 2:58 |
| 2024-12-14 | Win | (China) Feng Rui | K-1 World Grand Prix 2024 Final, Final | Tokyo, Japan | KO (Left hook) | 1 | 2:55 |
Wins the K-1 World Grand Prix 2024 Final title.
| 2024-12-14 | Win | (Netherlands) Errol Zimmerman | K-1 World Grand Prix 2024 Final, Semifinals | Tokyo, Japan | TKO (2 Knockdowns/low kicks) | 2 | 2:33 |
| 2024-12-14 | Win | (United Kingdom) Rhys Brudenell | K-1 World Grand Prix 2024 Final, Quarterfinals | Tokyo, Japan | KO (Right hook) | 1 | 2:35 |
| 2024-08-24 | Win | (Brazil) Jhonny Klever | K-1 World GP 2024 in Brasília, Final | Brasília, Brazil | TKO (Low kicks) | 3 | 1:40 |
Qualifies for K-1 World Grand Prix 2024 Final.
| 2024-08-24 | Win | (Brazil) Guto Inocente | K-1 World GP 2024 in Brasília, Semifinals | Brasília, Brazil | Decision (Unanimous) | 3 | 3:00 |
| 2024-08-24 | Win | (Brazil) Abner Ferreira | K-1 World GP 2024 in Brasília, Quarterfinals | Brasília, Brazil | TKO (2 Knockdowns/low kick) | 2 | 1:40 |
| 2024-07-06 | Win | (Greece) Giannis Stoforidis | SENSHI 22 | Varna, Bulgaria | TKO (Punches) | 2 | 1:29 |
| 2024-02-03 | Loss | (Russia) Arseniy Smirnov | RCC Fair Fight 26 | Yekaterinburg, Russia | Decision (Unanimous) | 3 | 3:00 |
| 2023-09-10 | Loss | (China) Liu Ce | K-1 World GP 2023: ReBOOT～K-1 ReBIRTH～ World Grand Prix Semifinals | Yokohama, Japan | KO (Low kick) | 2 | 1:57 |
| 2023-09-10 | Win | (Poland) Michał Turyński | K-1 World GP 2023: ReBOOT～K-1 ReBIRTH～ World Grand Prix Quarterfinals | Yokohama, Japan | Ext.R Decision (Unanimous) | 4 | 3:00 |
| 2023-06-17 | Win | (Brazil) Lucas Paredes | WGP Kickboxing #70 | Curitiba, Brazil | Decision (Unanimous) | 5 | 3:00 |
Wins the vacant WGP Kickboxing Light Heavyweight (-94,1kg) title.
| 2023-03-25 | Loss | (Russia) Valeriy Bizyaev | Ural FC 2 | Samara, Russia | KO (Punches) | 2 | 2:45 |
For the Ural FC K-1 -91 kg title.
| 2023-02-02 | Loss | (Russia) Beybulat Isaev | Muaythai Factory | Kemerovo, Russia | Decision (Unanimous) | 3 | 3:00 |
| 2022-11-04 | Win | (Brazil) Lucas Monteiro | WGP Kickboxing #67 | Curitiba, Brazil | TKO (Low kicks) | 2 | |
| 2022-07-15 | Loss | (Russia) Nikita Kozlov | RCC Fair Fight 18 | Yekaterinburg, Russia | Decision (Unanimous) | 3 | 3:00 |
| 2019-12-21 | Win | (Netherlands) Michael Duut | Glory Collision 2 | Arnhem, Netherlands | Decision (Unanimous) | 3 | 3:00 |
| 2019-09-13 | Win | (Paraguay) Marcelo Nuñez | WGP Kickboxing #57 | Curitiba, Brazil | KO (Right Hook) | 1 | 1:18 |
| 2018-07-27 | Win | (Brazil) Haime Morais | WGP Kickboxing #47 | Curitiba, Brazil | Decision (Split) | 3 | 3:00 |
| 2017-10-28 | Loss | (Russia) Artem Vakhitov | Glory 47: Lyon | Lyon, France | Decision (unanimous) | 5 | 3:00 |
For the Glory Light Heavyweight Championship.
| 2017-07-01 | Win | (Argentina) Lucas Alsina | WGP Kickboxing #38 | Curitiba, Brazil | KO (Flying Knee) | 3 | 2:42 |
| 2017-02-24 | Win | (France) Zinedine Hameur-Lain | Glory 38: Chicago, Final | Hoffman Estates, Illinois, USA | TKO (Punches) | 1 | 2:43 |
Wins the Glory Light Heavyweight Contender Tournament.
| 2017-02-24 | Win | (Germany) Danyo Ilunga | Glory 38: Chicago, Semi-finals | Hoffman Estates, Illinois, USA | Decision (unanimous) | 3 | 3:00 |
| 2016-10-21 | Loss | (Tunisia) Yousri Belgaroui | Glory 34: Denver - Middleweight Contender Tournament, Semi-finals | Broomfield, Colorado, USA | Decision (unanimous) | 3 | 3:00 |
| 2016-07-22 | Loss | (France) Zinedine Hameur-Lain | Glory 32: Virginia, Final | Norfolk, Virginia | KO (strikes) | 2 | 1:00 |
For the Glory Light Heavyweight Contender Tournament.
| 2016-07-22 | Win | (Ukraine) Pavel Zhuravlev | Glory 32: Virginia, Semi-finals | Norfolk, Virginia, USA | Decision (unanimous) | 3 | 3:00 |
| 2016-04-09 | Win | (Brazil) Maycon Silva | WGP Kickboxing #29 | Brazil | Decision | 3 | 3:00 |
| 2015-09-05 | Loss | (Brazil) Junior Alpha | WGP Kickboxing #26, Semi-final | Guarapuava, Brazil | Decision | 3 | 3:00 |
| 2010-06-21 | Win | (Brazil) Edvaldo Gameth | Copa Mestre Omar Dias de Muay Thai | Curitiba, Brazil | KO | 2 | |
| 2009-04-05 | Loss | (Brazil) Alessandro Geloco | Brave FC | Curitiba, Brazil | KO (Right Hook) | 1 | |
| 2009-01- | | (Brazil) José Carlos Oliveira | | Brazil | Decision | 3 | 3:00 |
| 2008-03-08 | Win | (Croatia) Ante Verunica | Obračun u ringu 7 | Zadar, Croatia | Decision (Split) | 3 | 2:00 |
| 2007 | Win | (Brazil) Fábio Pelézinho | | Brazil | KO (Right Cross) | 2 | |
| 2005-10-27 | Loss | (Brazil) Cosmo Alexandre | K-1 Rules Heavyweight Factory GP | São Paulo, Brazil | Decision | 5 | 3:00 |
Legend: Win Loss Draw/No contest Notes

Amateur kickboxing record
| Date | Result | Opponent | Event | Location | Method | Round | Time |
|---|---|---|---|---|---|---|---|
| 2021-10- | Loss | (Azerbaijan) Bahram Rajabzadeh | W.A.K.O World Championships 2021, K-1 1/8 Final +91 kg | Jesolo, Italy | Decision (3:0) | 3 | 2:00 |
Legend: Win Loss Draw/No contest Notes

== Mixed martial arts record ==
Professional record breakdown
| 10 matches | 7 wins | 3 losses |
| By knockout | 7 | 2 |
| By submission | 0 | 1 |
| By decision | 0 | 0 |

| Res. | Record | Opponent | Method | Event | Date | Round | Time | Location | Notes |
|---|---|---|---|---|---|---|---|---|---|
| Win | 7-3 | Mauri Roque | TKO (Corner Stoppage) | Power Fight Extreme 12 | 13 December 2014 | 2 | 5:00 | Curitiba, Brazil | |
| Loss | 6-3 | Julio Cesar Araujo Fernandes | Submission (Rear naked choke) | Talent MMA Circuit 11 - Sao Jose dos Pinhais 2014 | 23 August 2014 | 1 | 1:58 | Pinhais, Brazil | |
| Win | 6-2 | Dyego Roberto | TKO (Punches and Knees) | Power Fight Extreme 11 | 17 May 2014 | 2 | 0:43 | Curitiba, Brazil | |
| Loss | 5-2 | Gerson da Silva Conceicao | Submission (Punches) | Watch Out Combat Show 29 | 20 September 2013 | 2 | 1:03 | Rio de Janeiro, Brazil | |
| Win | 5-1 | Rodrigo Jesus | TKO (Punches) | Power Fight Extreme 9 | 29 June 2013 | 2 | 0:45 | Curitiba, Brazil | |
| Win | 4-1 | Bruno Assuncao Bogado | TKO (Head Kick) | Adventure Fighters Tournament 4 | 9 March 2013 | 1 | 0:33 | Curitiba, Brazil | |
| Win | 3-1 | Tiago Batista Costa | TKO | Beltrao Combat 2 | 10 November 2012 | 2 | | Brazil | |
| Win | 2-1 | Wanderley da Hora | TKO (Punches) | Duelo de Titas | 24 March 2012 | 1 | 2:40 | Brazil | |
| Win | 1-1 | Tiago Monaco Tosato | TKO (Punches) | Adventure Fighters Tournament | 15 October 2011 | 1 | 2:37 | Curitiba, Brazil | |
| Loss | 0-1 | Paulo Bueno | Submission (Punches) | Toycas Toyota Cup 2006 | 29 July 2006 | 1 | 1:20 | Curitiba, Brazil | |

== See also ==
- List of male kickboxers
