= Kacper Muszyński =

Polish kickboxer

- Born: 11 October 1997 (age 29); Polkowice, Poland
- Height: 1.77 m (5 ft 9 1/2 in)
- Weight: 70 kg (154 lb; 11 st 0 lb)
- Style: Kickboxing
- Stance: Orthodox
- Fighting out of: Polkowice, Poland
- Team: Armia Polkowice
- Years active: 2014 - present

Kickboxing record
- Total: 33
- Wins: 29
- By knockout: 13
- Losses: 3
- By knockout: 1
- Draws: 1

Mixed martial arts record
- Total: 1
- Wins: 1
- By knockout: 1

Kacper Muszyński (born 11 October 1997) is a Polish kickboxer and mixed martial artist.

As of April 2024, he is ranked as the tenth best lightweight kickboxer in the world by Beyond Kickboxing.

== Kickboxing career ==
Muszyński faced Alex Głowacki for the WKSF Lightweight (-70 kg) championship at K-1 Night of Champions on February 5, 2017. He won the fight by a third-round technical knockout.

Muszyński faced Hubert Moczulski at Jaworskiej Gali Sztuk Walki IV on March 25, 2017. He won the fight by unanimous decision.

Muszyński faced Milan Paverka at Ironsports Fight Night on April 1, 2018. Paverka handed him his first professional loss, as he won the fight by split decision.

Muszyński faced Tomas Drabnik at MFC 14 on September 22, 2018. He won the fight by unanimous decision.

Muszyński faced Angelo Urrutia in an MFC Lightweight title eliminator at MFC 16 on October 10, 2019. He won the fight by unanimous decision.

Muszyński faced Miroslav Smolar for the MFC Lightweight (-70 kg) championship at MFC 17 on December 19, 2019. He won the fight by a first-round knockout.

Muszyński faced Călin Petrișor in the semifinals of the 2024 Iron Fight Lightweight tournament. He won the fight by unanimous decision. Muszyński advanced to the finals of the one-day tournament, where he faced Jordy Beekwilder. He once again won the fight by unanimous decision.

Muszyński faced the one-time Glory Lightweight championship challenger Stoyan Koprivlenski in the K-1 World MAX 2024 - World Tournament Opening Round on March 20, 2024. He won the fight by unanimous decision. Muszyński was able to knock Koprivlenski down once, at the very end of the third and final round.

Muszyński faced Zhora Akopyan in the quarterfinals of the 2024 K-1 MAX World Championship tournament at K-1 World MAX 2024 - World Championship Tournament Final on July 7, 2024. He won the fight by unanimous decision, with three scorecards of 30–28 in his favor, but was forced to withdraw from the semifinal bout as he broke his right hand during the bout.

Muszyński faced Chen Yonghui at K-1 Dontaku on July 13, 2025. He won the fight by a second-round knockout.

Muszyński faced Ouyang Feng in the opening round of the K-1 World MAX 2025 World Championship Tournament on September 7, 2025. He lost the fight by majority decision.

Muszyński faced Dengue Silva at K-1 World GP 2026 - 90kg World Tournament in a middleweight (-75 kg) bout on February 8, 2026. He lost by first round knockout.

== Mixed martial arts career ==
Muszyński made his mixed martial arts debut against Vladislav Bilorus at MFG 4 on September 25, 2022. He won the fight by a first-round knockout.

== Championships and accomplishments ==
=== Amateur ===
- Polska Federacja Kickboxingu
  - 2013 Polish Junior K-1 Cup 3rd Place (-63.5 kg)
  - 2013 International Open Polish Cup, K-1 Rules 1st Place (-63.5 kg)
  - 2013 Polish Junior Low Kick Cup Runner-up (-63.5 kg)
  - 2014 Polish Low Kick Championship 1st Place (-71 kg)
  - 2014 Polish Junior Oriental Rules Championship 1st Place (-67 kg)
  - 2014 Polish Full Contact Championship 1st Place (-71 kg)
  - 2015 Polish Junior Low Kick Championship 2nd Place (-71 kg)
  - 2016 Polish Junior Low Kick Championship 1st Place (-75 kg)
  - 2016 Polish Junior K-1 Championship 1st Place (-71 kg)
  - 2019 Polish K-1 Championship 1st Place & MVP Award Winner (-75 kg)
  - 2019 Polish Low Kick Championship 1st Place (-75 kg)
  - 2019 Grand Prix Jurassic Warriors II K-1 Rules 1st Place (-75 kg)
- World Association of Kickboxing Organizations
  - 2013 WAKO Szeged Junior World Cup Winner
  - 2013 WAKO European Championship Young Junior K-1 -63.5 kg (gold)
  - 2014 WAKO Junior World Championships, K-1 Junior (-67 kg) (silver)
  - 2016 WAKO Junior World Championships, K-1 Older Junior (-67 kg) (bronze)
  - 2018 WAKO Austrian Classic World Cup, K-1 (-75 kg) (silver)

=== Professional ===
- Makowski Fighting Championship
  - 2019 MFC Lightweight (-70 kg) Championship
- Iron Fight
  - 2024 Iron Fight Lightweight (-70 kg) Tournament Winner

== Kickboxing record ==
Professional kickboxing record
29 Wins (13 (T)KOs), 3 Losses, 1 Draw
Date	Result	Opponent	Event	Location	Method	Round	Time
2026-12-29		(Italy) Lorenzo Di Vara	K-1 World MAX 2026 - World Championship Tournament Final, Quarterfinals	Yokohama, Japan			
2026-09-12	Win	(Ukraine) Serhii Adamchuk	K-1 World MAX 2026 - World Tournament Opening Round	Tokyo, Japan	Ext.R Decision (Split)	4	3:00
Qualifies for the 2026 K-1 World MAX World Championship Tournament Final.
2026-05-31	Win	(Japan) Seiya Tanigawa	K-1 Revenge	Tokyo, Japan	KO (Punches)	1	0:49
2026-03-28	Win	(Moldova) Dan Lungu	Strike King 8	Elbląg, Poland	Decision (Unanimous)	3	3:00
2026-02-08	Loss	(Brazil) Dengue Silva	K-1 World GP 2026 - 90kg World Tournament	Tokyo, Japan	KO (Punches)	1	2:48
2025-09-07	Loss	(China) Ouyang Feng	K-1 World MAX 2025 - World Tournament Opening Round	Tokyo, Japan	Decision (Majority)	3	3:00
Fails to qualify for K-1 World MAX 2025 World Championship Tournament Final.
2025-07-13	Win	(China) Chen Yonghui	K-1 Dontaku	Fukuoka, Japan	KO (Body kick)	2	2:01
2024-12-14	Win	(Romania) Valentin Mavrodin	K-1 World Grand Prix 2024 Final	Tokyo, Japan	TKO (Referee stoppage)	3	2:08
2024-07-07	Win	(Armenia) Zhora Akopyan	K-1 World MAX 2024 - World Championship Tournament Final, Quarter Finals	Tokyo, Japan	Decision (Unanimous)	3	3:00
Muszyński withdrew from the tournament due to injury.
2024-03-20	Win	(Bulgaria) Stoyan Koprivlenski	K-1 World MAX 2024 - World Tournament Opening Round	Tokyo, Japan	Decision (Unanimous)	3	3:00
Qualifies for the K-1 World MAX 2024 World Championship Final.
2024-02-24	Win	(Netherlands) Jordy Beekwilder	Iron Fight 24, Tournament Final	Pordenone, Italy	Decision (Unanimous)	3	3:00
Wins the Iron Fight Lightweight (-70 kg) Tournament.
2024-02-24	Win	(Romania) Călin Petrișor	Iron Fight 24, Tournament Semifinal	Pordenone, Italy	Decision (Split)	3	3:00
2023-07-10	Win	(Romania) Anghel Cardoș	MFG 6	Polkowice, Poland	Decision (Unanimous)	3	3:00
2022-03-19	Win	(Hungary) Roland Tresó	MFG 3	Lubin, Poland	Decision (Unanimous)	3	3:00
2022-01-22	Win	(Hungary) Zsolt Szamkó	MFG 2	Polkowice, Poland	TKO (Retirement)	1	3:00
2020-10-03	Win	(Czech Republic) Jan Sindelar	MFC 18	Zielona Góra, Poland	Decision (Unanimous)	3	3:00
2019-12-14	Win	(Czech Republic) Miroslav Smolar	MFC 17	Nowa Sól, Poland	KO (Knee)	1	
Wins the MFC Lightweight (-70 kg) Championship.
2019-10-05	Win	(Colombia) Angelo Urrutia	MFC 16	Nowa Sól, Poland	Decision (Unanimous)	3	3:00
2018-12-15	Win	(Austria) Vahit Ipek	MFC 15	Nowa Sól, Poland	Decision (Unanimous)	3	3:00
2018-09-22	Win	(Slovakia) Tomas Drabnik	MFC 14	Zielona Góra, Poland	Decision (Unanimous)	3	3:00
2018-04-01	Loss	(Czech Republic) Milan Paverka	Ironsports Fight Night	Niesky, Germany	Decision (Split)	3	3:00
2017-12-16	Draw	(Germany) Fabian Hundt	MFC 13	Nowa Sól, Poland	Decision	3	3:00
2017-12-02	Win	(Poland) Kamil Stefański	Extreme Energy Time II	Polkowice, Poland	TKO	1	
2017-04-22	Win	(Poland) Alan Kwieciński	Extreme Energy Time I	Legnica, Poland	Decision (Unanimous)	3	3:00
2017-03-25	Win	(Poland) Łukasz Szecówka	Jaworskiej Gali Sztuk Walki IV	Jawor, Poland	Decision (Unanimous)	3	3:00
2017-02-05	Win	(Poland) Alex Głowacki	K-1 Night of Champions	Kłodzko, Poland	TKO (Low kicks)	3	
Wins the WKSF Lightweight (-70 kg) Championship.
2016-11-19	Win	(Hungary) Tomas Horvath	Energetyk Boxing Night 4	Polkowice, Poland	KO (Uppercut)	1	2:59
Wins the WFMC International Polish Lightweight (-70 kg) Championship.
2016-03-19	Win	(Poland) Mateusz Wojna	Jaworskiej Gali Sztuk Walki III	Jawor, Poland	Decision (Unanimous)	3	3:00
2015-11-21	Win	(Poland) Maciej Drajer	Hyundai Boxing Night	Polkowice, Poland	Decision (Unanimous)	3	2:00
2015-09-17	Win	(Germany) Memo Basturg	WFMC Pro Fight IV	Żagań, Poland	TKO (Punches)	1	3:00
2014-10-18	Win	(Poland) Łukasz Sawicki	Gala Sportów Walki w Polkowicach	Polkowice, Poland	Decision (Unanimous)	3	3:00
Legend: Win Loss Draw/No contest Notes

Amateur kickboxing record
Date	Result	Opponent	Event	Location	Method	Round	Time
2018-04-22	Loss	(Italy) Mario Nani	2018 WAKO Austrian Classics, Finals	Innsbruck, Austria	Decision (3:0)	3	2:00
Wins 2018 WAKO Austrian Classics K-1 Senior -75kg Silver Medal.
2018-04-21	Win	(Slovenia) Nemanja Veljković	2018 WAKO Austrian Classics, Semifinals	Innsbruck, Austria	Decision (3:0)	3	2:00
2018-04-20	Win	(Slovenia) Timi Spasojeivć	2018 WAKO Austrian Classics, Quarterfinals	Innsbruck, Austria	Decision (3:0)	3	2:00
2016-09-01	Loss	(Czech Republic) Tadeas Ruzicka	2016 WAKO Cadets and Juniors World Championships, Semifinals	Dublin, Ireland	Decision (3:0)	3	2:00
Wins 2016 WAKO Cadets and Juniors World Championships K-1 Older Junior -71kg Bronze Medal.
2016-08-29	Win	(Slovakia) Martin Oravkin	2016 WAKO Cadets and Juniors World Championships, Quarterfinals	Dublin, Ireland	Decision (3:0)	3	2:00
2016-08-27	Win	(Russia) Andrei Shubin	2016 WAKO Cadets and Juniors World Championships, First Round	Dublin, Ireland	Decision (2:1)	3	2:00
2014-09-18	Loss	(Russia) Vlad Tuinov	2014 WAKO Cadets and Juniors World Championships, Final	Rimini, Italy	Decision	3	2:00
Wins 2014 WAKO Cadets and Juniors World Championships K-1 Junior -67kg Silver Medal.
2014-09-16	Win	(Russia) Ruslan Ivanov	2014 WAKO Cadets and Juniors World Championships, Semifinals	Rimini, Italy	Decision	3	2:00
2013-09-	Win	(Hungary) Gabor Kadas	2013 WAKO Cadets and Juniors European Championships, Final	Krynica-Zdrój, Poland	Decision	3	2:00
Wins 2013 WAKO Cadets and Juniors European Championships K-1 Young Junior -63.5kg Gold Medal.
2013-09-	Win	(Russia) Ruslan Aliev	2013 WAKO Cadets and Juniors European Championships, Semifinals	Krynica-Zdrój, Poland	Decision	3	2:00
Legend: Win Loss Draw/No contest Notes

== Mixed martial arts record ==
Professional record breakdown
1 match	1 win	0 losses
By knockout	1	0

Res.	Record	Opponent	Method	Event	Date	Round	Time	Location	Notes
Win	1–0	Vladislav Bilorus	TKO (Punches)	MFG 4	September 25, 2022	1		Polkowice, Poland	

Amateur record breakdown		
1 match	1 win	0 losses
By knockout	1	0

Res.	Record	Opponent	Method	Event	Date	Round	Time	Location	Notes
Win	1–0	Grzegorz Rogalski	KO (elbow)	MFG 1	9 November 2021	1	0:55	Polkowice, Poland	

== See also ==
- List of male kickboxers
