= Viktor Akimov =

Russian kickboxer

- Born: September 22, 1991 (age 35); Vladivostok, Russia
- Height: 1.75 m (5 ft 9 in)
- Weight: 70 kg (150 lb; 11 st)
- Style: Kickboxing
- Stance: Orthodox
- Fighting out of: Toyama, Japan
- Team: Brazilian Thai

Kickboxing record
- Total: 19
- Wins: 13
- By knockout: 9
- Losses: 6
- By knockout: 0
- Draws: 0
- No contests: 0

Viktor Akimov (born 22 September 1991) is a Russian kickboxer. He is the 2024 K-1 World MAX 2024 runner-up.

== Career ==
Akimov faced Stoyan Koprivlenski in the finals of the K-1 World MAX 2024 World Championship Final. He lost by a first-round knockout.

== Titles and accomplishments ==
- K-1
  - 2024 K-1 World MAX Runner-up

== Kickboxing record ==
Kickboxing record
13 wins (9 (T)KOs), 6 losses, 0 draws
Date	Result	Opponent	Event	Location	Method	Round	Time
2025-06-21	Loss	(Russia) Vitaly Shnyukov	RCC Fair Fight 31	Yekaterinburg, Russia	Decision (unanimous)	3	3:00
2025-02-09	Loss	(Japan) Kensei Kondo	2025 in K-1#K-1 World MAX 2025	Tokyo, Japan	TKO (3 knockdowns)	1	2:19
2024-07-07	Loss	(Bulgaria) Stoyan Koprivlenski	K-1 World MAX 2024 - World Championship Tournament Final, Final	Tokyo, Japan	TKO (punches)	1	2:07
Loses the K-1 World MAX 2024 World Championship Final.
2024-07-07	Win	(Spain) Sergio Sanchez	K-1 World MAX 2024 - World Championship Tournament Final, Semi Finals	Tokyo, Japan	KO (low kick)	3	1:33
2024-07-07	Win	(Suriname) Romano Bakboord	K-1 World MAX 2024 - World Championship Tournament Final, Quarter Finals	Tokyo, Japan	KO (straight to the body)	2	0:06
2024-03-20	Win	(Japan) Rei Nakajima	K-1 World MAX 2024 - World Tournament Opening Round	Tokyo, Japan	KO (spinning backfist)	2	1:45
Qualifies for the K-1 World MAX 2024 World Championship Final.
2024-03-09	Win	(Japan) Ryuichi	Hoost Cup Kings Kyoto 13	Kyoto, Japan	TKO (referee stoppage)	2	2:29
2023-11-12	Win	(Japan) Riku Yoshida	S-Battle 2023: Winter Siege	Aichi, Japan	KO (knee)	1	2:23
2023-02-28	Loss	(Japan) YURA	Gold Rush 11	Osaka, Japan	TKO (corner stoppage)	3	
Loses the RKS Welterweight (66kg) title.
2022-09-04	Win	(Japan) Riki Sakurai	Gold Rush 10	Osaka, Japan	TKO (corner stoppage)	2	1:44
Won the vacant RKS Welterweight (66kg) title.
2022-07-10	Win	(Japan) Riku Yoshida	Hoost Cup Kings Nagoya 11	Aichi, Japan	KO (right hook)	3	2:39
2022-03-27	Loss	(Japan) Riku	Hoost Cup Kings Kyoto 9	Kyoto, Japan	Decision (majority)	3	3:00
Legend: Win Loss Draw/no contest Notes
