= Stoyan Koprivlenski =

Bulgarian professional kickboxer

- Born: Стоян Копривленски; June 21, 1994 (age 32); Burgas, Bulgaria
- Other names: The Sniper
- Height: 1.80 m (5 ft 11 in)
- Weight: 70 kg (150 lb; 11 st)
- Division: Light middleweight
- Reach: 69.5 in (177 cm)
- Style: Kickboxing
- Stance: Orthodox
- Fighting out of: Oostzaan, Netherlands
- Team: Mike's Gym
- Trainer: Mike Passenier
- Years active: 2013 - present

Kickboxing record
- Total: 39
- Wins: 28
- By knockout: 9
- Losses: 11
- By knockout: 2
- Draws: 0

Other information
- University: Nikola Vaptsarov Naval Academy

Stoyan Koprivlenski (born 21 June 1994) is a Bulgarian kickboxer, fighting out of Oostzaan, Netherlands. He currently competes in the -70 kg divisions of Glory and K-1, where he is the 2024 K-1 World MAX Championship Tournament Final Champion. As of December 12, 2021, he is #1 in the official Glory lightweight rankings.

As of September 2022, Combat Press ranks him as the 10th best lightweight kickboxer in the world.

== Kickboxing career ==
=== GLORY ===
Koprivlenski was scheduled to make his Glory debut against Kevin Hessling at Glory 45: Amsterdam on September 30, 2017. He lost the fight by unanimous decision.

Koprivlenski participated in the Glory lightweight contender tournament, held at Glory 49: Rotterdam on December 9, 2017. He was scheduled to face Maykol Yurk in the tournament semifinals. Koprivlenski beat Yurk by a first-round knockout. Advancing to the tournament finals, Koprivlenski faced Tyjani Beztati. He won the fight by unanimous decision.

Koprivlenski was scheduled to face Josh Jauncey at Glory 52: Los Angeles on March 31, 2018. He lost the fight by split decision. The bout was later nominated as the 2018 "Fight of the Year".

Koprivlenski was scheduled to face Anil Cabri at Glory 59: Amsterdam on September 29, 2018. He won the fight by unanimous decision.

Koprivlenski was scheduled to fight a rematch with Tyjani Beztati at Glory 62: Rotterdam on December 8, 2018. He lost the fight by unanimous decision.

Koprivlenski was scheduled to face Mohammed Jaraya at Glory 66: Paris on June 22, 2019. He beat Jaraya by a third-round technical knockout.

Koprivlenski was scheduled to face Josh Jauncey for the second time in his career at Glory 73: Shenzhen on December 7, 2019. He lost the fight by split decision.

The COVID-19 pandemic forced Koprivlenski to seek fights outside of Glory, as the organization was unable to consistently hold events.. He was scheduled to face Cristian Milea at The Spirit of Bulgaria on October 3, 2020. He won the fight by unanimous decision.

Koprivlenski was scheduled to face Artur Zakirko at Max Fight 46 on August 2, 2021. He won the fight by unanimous decision.

Koprivlenski was scheduled to challenge Sorin Căliniuc for the Colosseum Tournament World Lightweight Championship at Colosseum Tournament 27 on September 20, 2021. He lost the closely contested fight by split decision.

Korpivlenski was scheduled to face Bruno Gazani at Glory: Collision 3 on October 23, 2021. He won the fight by unanimous decision, with all five judges awarding him a 30-27 scorecard.

Korpivlenski was expected to face the Fair Fight title holder Mamuka Usubyan, and then his replacement Amir Abdullahhad at Fair Fight XVI on February 12, 2022. Abdullahhad later withdrew from the bout, and was replaced by Dzianis Zuev who took the fight on short notice.

Korpivlenski faced Guerric Billet at Glory 81: Ben Saddik vs. Adegbuy 2 on August 20, 2022. He won the fight by unanimous decision.

Koprivlenski challenged Tyjani Beztati for the Glory Lightweight Championship at Glory: Collision 4 on October 8, 2022. He lost the fight by split decision.

Koprivlenski faced Kaito Ono at RISE WORLD SERIES / Glory Rivals 4 on December 25, 2022. He lost the fight by split decision. Two of the judges scored the bout 30–29 for Kaito, while the third judge scored it 30–29 for Koprivlenski.

Koprivlenski was booked to face Sorin Căliniuc at Glory 89 on October 7, 2023. He won the fight by unanimous decision, after knocking Căliniuc down with a head kick in the second round.

=== K-1 ===
On February 8, 2024, it was announced that Koprivlenski would be one of sixteen participants of the K-1 World MAX 2024 - World Tournament Opening Round event where he would face Kacper Muszyński on March 20, 2024. He lost the fight by unanimous decision.

Koprivlenski faced Buakaw Banchamek in the 2024 K-1 World MAX Championship quarterfinal at K-1 World MAX 2024 - World Championship Tournament Final on July 7, 2024, as a replacement for Ouyang Feng, who withdrew from the competition due to a rib injury. He won the fight by unanimous decision. Koprivlenski overcame Dengue Silva by unanimous decision in the semifinals and faced Viktor Akimov in the finals of the one-day tournament. He captured the tournament title by a first-round knockout.

Koprivlenski faced the Krush Super Welterweight champion Jinku Oda in a non-title bout at K-1 World GP 2024 in Osaka on October 5, 2024. He won the fight by unanimous decision, after an extra fourth round was contested.

Koprivlenski faced Abdoulaye Diallo at Pro Fight 28 on May 31, 2025. He won the fight by unanimous decision.

Koprivlenski faced Kubilay Tarhan at Brave CF 97 on July 12, 2025. He won the fight by a second-round knockout.

Koprivlenski faced Denis Tapu at K-1 World MAX 2025 - World Tournament Opening Round on September 7, 2025. He won the fight by unanimous decision.

Koprivlenski was scheduled to face Minoru Kimura at K-1 World MAX 2025 - World Championship Tournament Final, Quarterfinals. Kimura was withdrawn due to an injury on October 10, 2025, leaving Koprivlenski in need of a new opponent.

Koprivlenski faced Hercules WanKongOhm.WKO in the quarterfinals of the 2025 World MAX at K-1 World MAX 2025 - World Championship Tournament Final on November 15, 2025. He won the fight by unanimous decision, with scores of 30–28, 30—28 and 30–27. Koprivlenski advanced to the semifinals of the one-day tournament, where he lost to Darryl Verdonk by a third-round knockout.

Koprivlenski faced Joey Klijenburg at Brave CF 107 on August 1, 2026. In front of an audience of 5000, he won the fight by unanimous decision.

== Championships and accomplishments ==
=== Professional ===
- K-1
  - 2024 K-1 World MAX Championship Tournament Final Winner
  - 2024 K-1 Fight of the Year (vs. Buakaw Banchamek)
- Glory
  - 2017 Glory Lightweight (-70kg) Contender Tournament Winner
  - 2017 Knockout Kick of the Year vs. Maykol Yurk
  - 2018 Fight of the Year nomination
- Max Fight
  - 2022 Max Fight Lightweight Championship
- Kickboxing Romania Awards
  - 2023 Fight of the Year vs. Sorin Căliniuc at Glory 89

=== Amateur ===
- World Association of Kickboxing Organizations
  - 2014 W.A.K.O. European Championships in Bilbao, Spain K-1 -71 kg (bronze)

== Fight record ==
Professional Kickboxing record
28 Wins (9 KOs), 11 Losses, 0 Draws
Date	Result	Opponent	Event	Location	Method	Round	Time	Record
2026-09-12	Loss	(Russia) Vladimir Tulaev	K-1 World MAX 2026 - World Tournament Opening Round	Tokyo, Japan	KO (Left hook)	2	2:16	28–11
Fails to qualify for the 2026 K-1 World MAX World Championship Tournament Final.
2026-08-01	Win	(Netherlands) Joey Klijenburg	Brave CF 107	Burgas, Bulgaria	Decision (Unanimous)	3	3:00	28–10
2025-11-15	Loss	(Netherlands) Darryl Verdonk	K-1 World MAX 2025 - World Championship Tournament Final, Semifinals	Tokyo, Japan	KO (Right hook)	3	0:46	27–10
2025-11-15	Win	(Thailand) Hercules WanKongOhm.WKO	K-1 World MAX 2025 - World Championship Tournament Final, Quarterfinals	Tokyo, Japan	Decision (Unanimous)	3	3:00	27–9
2025-09-07	Win	(Moldova) Denis Țapu	K-1 World MAX 2025 - World Tournament Opening Round	Tokyo, Japan	Decision (Unanimous)	3	3:00	26–9
Qualifies for K-1 World MAX 2025 World Championship Tournament Final.
2025-07-12	Win	(Turkey) Kubilay Tarhan	Brave CF 97	Burgas, Bulgaria	KO (Jumping knee)	2	0:38	25–9
2025-05-31	Win	(Senegal) Abdoulaye Diallo	Pro Fight 28	Gorna Oryahovitsa, Bulgaria	Decision (Unanimous)	3	3:00	24–9
2024-12-14	Loss	(Japan) Hiromi Wajima	K-1 World Grand Prix 2024 Final	Tokyo, Japan	Decision (Unanimous)	3	3:00	23–9
2024-10-05	Win	(Japan) Jinku Oda	K-1 World GP 2024 in Osaka	Osaka, Japan	Ext.R Decision (Split)	4	3:00	23–8
2024-07-07	Win	(Russia) Viktor Akimov	K-1 World MAX 2024 - World Championship Tournament Final, Final	Tokyo, Japan	TKO (Punches)	1	2:07	22–8
Win the K-1 World MAX 2024 World Championship Final.
2024-07-07	Win	(Brazil) Dengue Silva	K-1 World MAX 2024 - World Championship Tournament Final, Semifinals	Tokyo, Japan	Decision (Unanimous)	3	3:00	21–8
2024-07-07	Win	(Thailand) Buakaw Banchamek	K-1 World MAX 2024 - World Championship Tournament Final, Quarterfinals	Tokyo, Japan	Decision (Unanimous)	3	3:00	20–8
2024-03-20	Loss	(Poland) Kacper Muszyński	K-1 World MAX 2024 - World Tournament Opening Round	Tokyo, Japan	Decision (Unanimous)	3	3:00	19–8
K-1 World MAX 2024 World Championship Final Qualifier bout.
2023-10-07	Win	(Romania) Sorin Căliniuc	Glory 89	Burgas, Bulgaria	Decision (Unanimous)	3	3:00	19–7
2022-12-25	Loss	(Japan) Kaito Ono	RISE WORLD SERIES / Glory Rivals 4	Tokyo, Japan	Decision (Split)	3	3:00	18–7
2022-10-08	Loss	(Morocco) Tyjani Beztati	Glory: Collision 4	Arnhem, Netherlands	Decision (Split)	5	3:00	18–6
For the Glory Lightweight Championship
2022-08-20	Win	(France) Guerric Billet	Glory 81: Ben Saddik vs. Adegbuyi 2	Düsseldorf, Germany	Decision (Unanimous)	3	3:00	18–5
Glory Lightweight title eliminator.
2022-05-21	Win	(Moldova) Maxim Răilean	Max Fight 50	Arbanasi, Bulgaria	TKO (High kick)	1	N/A	17–5
Wins the Max Fight Lightweight Championship.
2022-02-12	Win	(Belarus) Dzianis Zuev	Fair Fight XVI	Yekaterinburg, Russia	Decision (Unanimous)	3	3:00	16–5
2021-12-11	Win	(Russia) Arbi Emiev	Mix Fight Championship: Fight Club	Frankfurt, Germany	KO (Head kick)	2	2:06	15–5
2021-10-23	Win	(Brazil) Bruno Gazani	Glory: Collision 3	Arnhem, Netherlands	Decision (Unanimous)	3	3:00	14–5
2021-09-20	Loss	(Romania) Sorin Căliniuc	Colosseum Tournament 27	Oradea, Romania	Decision (split)	5	3:00	13–5
For the Colosseum Tournament World Lightweight Championship.
2021-08-02	Win	(Ukraine) Artur Zakirko	Max Fight 46	Sveti Vlas, Bulgaria	Decision (Unanimous)	3	3:00	13–4
2020-10-03	Win	(Romania) Cristian Milea	The Spirit of Bulgaria	Plovdiv, Bulgaria	Decision (unanimous)	3	3:00	12–4
2019-12-07	Loss	(Canada) Josh Jauncey	Glory 73: Shenzhen	Shenzhen, China	Decision (split)	3	3:00	11–4
2019-06-22	Win	(Morocco) Mohammed Jaraya	Glory 66: Paris	Paris, France	TKO (doctor stoppage)	3	2:13	11–3
2018-12-08	Loss	(Morocco) Tyjani Beztati	Glory 62: Rotterdam	Rotterdam, Netherlands	Decision (unanimous)	3	3:00	10–3
2018-09-29	Win	(Turkey) Anil Cabri	Glory 59: Amsterdam	Amsterdam, Netherlands	Decision (unanimous)	3	3:00	10–2
2018-03-31	Loss	(Canada) Josh Jauncey	Glory 52: Los Angeles	Los Angeles, United States	Decision (split)	3	3:00	9–2
2017-12-09	Win	(Morocco) Tyjani Beztati	Glory 49: Rotterdam - Lightweight Contender Tournament, Final	Rotterdam, Netherlands	Decision (unanimous)	3	3:00	9–1
Wins Glory Lightweight Contender Tournament.
2017-12-09	Win	(Brazil) Maykol Yurk	Glory 49: Rotterdam - Lightweight Contender Tournament, Semi Finals	Rotterdam, Netherlands	KO (head kick)	1	2:47	8–1
2017-09-30	Loss	(Netherlands) Kevin Hessling	Glory 45: Amsterdam	Amsterdam, Netherlands	Decision (unanimous)	3	3:00	7–1
2017-05-20	Win	(Netherlands) Paul Jansen	Glory 41: Holland	Den Bosch, Netherlands	Decision (unanimous)	3	3:00	7–0
2016-08-02	Win	(Russia) Arbi Emiev	Max Fight 39	Sveti Vlas, Bulgaria	Decision (unanimous)	3	3:00	6–0
2016-07-09	Win	(Netherlands) Kurt Omer		Zutphen, Netherlands	TKO (Three knockdowns)	3		5–0
2015-12-27	Win	(Bulgaria) Radoslav Vartanyanov	Max Fight 37	Burgas, Bulgaria	KO (liver punch)	2	1:07	4–0
2015-02-28	Win	(Spain) Jordi Fernandez	Ultimate Pro Fight 2	Sofia, Bulgaria	Decision	3	3:00	3–0
2014-12-10	Win	(Bulgaria) Rangel Ivanov	Ultimate Pro Fight	Sofia, Bulgaria	TKO (Doctor Stoppage)	2		2–0
Legend: Win Loss Draw/No contest Notes

Amateur Kickboxing record
Date	Result	Opponent	Event	Location	Method	Round	Time
2014-10-	Loss	(Israel) Itay Gershon	2014 WAKO European Championship, Semifinals	Bilbao, Spain	Decision (Unanimous)	3	2:00
Wins 2014 WAKO European Championship K-1 -71kg Bronze Medal.
2014-10-	Win	(Spain) Jairo Diaz	2014 WAKO European Championship, Quarterfinals	Bilbao, Spain	Decision (Unanimous)	3	2:00
Legend: Win Loss Draw/No contest Notes

== See also ==
- List of male kickboxers
