= Liu Ce =

Chinese kickboxer

- Born: 刘策; September 4, 1996 (age 30); Fushun, Liaoning, China
- Other names: The Oriental Dragon
- Height: 192 cm (6 ft 4 in)
- Weight: 95 kg (209 lb; 15.0 st)
- Division: Light Heavyweight; Cruiserweight; Heavyweight
- Reach: 197 cm (78 in)
- Style: Sanda, Kickboxing
- Stance: Orthodox
- Fighting out of: Tangshan, China
- Team: Tangshan Buntai Riding Fight Club/CFP
- Trainer: Wei Rui
- Years active: 2018 - present

Kickboxing record
- Total: 21
- Wins: 18
- By knockout: 14
- Losses: 3
- By knockout: 0

Mixed martial arts record
- Total: 5
- Wins: 4
- By knockout: 4
- Losses: 1
- By knockout: 1

Other information
- Mixed martial arts record from Sherdog

Liu Ce (Chinese: 刘策) is a Chinese professional Sanda kickboxer and MMA fighter, currently competing in the light heavyweight division of the UFC. He is the former K-1 Cruiserweight (−90kg) champion and the K-1 30th Anniversary Openweight Tournament winner.

== Professional kickboxing career ==
Liu started to focus on professional kickboxing full time in 2018. He lost his first two fights of the year on the Glory of Heroes promotion. He lost by decision to Marino Schouten on July 28, 2018 at Glory of Heroes 33: Shanghai. On October 12, 2018, Liu lost to Mikita Shostak by unanimous decision at Glory of Heroes 35: Meishan.

On August 9, 2023, it was announced that Liu Ce would be one of eight participants in the 30th Anniversary K-1 Openweight Grand Prix, which took place at K-1 World GP 2023: ReBOOT～K-1 ReBIRTH～ on September 10, 2023. Ce was booked to face Valentin Bordianu in the quarterfinals of the one-day tournament. He won the fight by a first-round knockout, as he was able to floor himn with a right hook midway through the opening round. Ce faced Glory veteran Ariel Machado in the semifinals and once again won by stoppage, forcing his opponent to stay on the canvas with low kicks in the second round. He won the tournament title with a first-round knockout of Claudiu Istrate in the tournament finals.

Liu Ce faced Seiya Tanigawa in a cruiserweight bout at K-1 ReBIRTH 2 on December 9, 2023. He won the fight by a first-round knockout.

Liu faced Sebastian Lutaniuc for the vacant ISKA K-1 Intercontinental Super-cruiserweight (-95 kg) title at Wu Lin Feng 2024: 12th Global Kung Fu Festival on January 27, 2024. He won the fight by a first-round technical knockout.

Liu faced K-1 Cruiserweight (-90kg) titlist Sina Karimian at K-1 World MAX 2024 - World Tournament Opening Round on March 20, 2024. He won the fight by a third-round knockout.

Liu made his first K-1 Cruiserweight (-90kg) title defense against Mahmoud Sattari at K-1 World MAX 2024 on September 29, 2024. He won the fight by majority decision. Liu was stripped of the title on May 26, 2025, after he pulled out of his scheduled title defense due to a nose injury a week before the event.

== Mixed martial arts career ==
=== Ultimate Fighting Championship ===
After gaining a record of 3–1 in his MMA career, Liu was scheduled to make his UFC debut against Junior Tafa on August 30, 2026, at UFC Fight Night 286. However, Tafa pulled out due to undisclosed reasons and was replaced by Levi Rodrigues Jr. He won the fight by knockout in the first round. This fight earned him a $100,000 Fight of the Night award.

== Championships and accomplishments ==
=== Mixed martial arts ===
- Ultimate Fighting Championship
  - Fight of the Night (One time) vs. Levi Rodrigues Jr.

=== Kickboxing ===
==== Professional ====
- K-1
  - 2024 K-1 Cruiserweight (−90kg) Champion
    - One successful defense
  - 2024 K-1 Fighter of the Year
  - 2023 K-1 30th Anniversary Openweight Tournament Winner
- International Sport Kickboxing Association
  - 2024 ISKA K-1 Intercontinental Super Cruiserweight (-95 kg) Champion

==== Amateur ====
- 2023 Chinese National Kickboxing Championship (gold) -90 kg

=== Sanda ===
- Amateur Sanda
  - 4x Liaoning Provincial Sanda Championship -90 kg (gold) (2013, 2014, 2015, 2016)
  - 2016 National Wushu Sanda Championship (silver) -100 kg
  - 2017 National Wushu Sanda Championship 5th place -100 kg

== Mixed martial arts record ==
Professional record breakdown
5 matches	4 wins	1 loss
By knockout	4	1
By submission	0	0
By decision	0	0

Res.	Record	Opponent	Method	Event	Date	Round	Time	Location	Notes
Win	4–1	Levi Rodrigues Jr.	KO (punch)	UFC Fight Night: Nurmagomedov vs. Song	August 29, 2026	1	4:26	Shanghai, China	Fight of the Night.
Win	3–1	Igor Barabanov	TKO (leg kicks and punches)	WLF W.A.R.S. 94	May 23, 2026	1	4:56	Zhengzhou, China	
Loss	2–1	Ivan Gnizditskiy	TKO (punches)	Happy Elephant MMA Champions League 11	October 12, 2024	2	1:55	Macau, SAR, China	
Win	2–0	Batjargal Munkh-Erdene	KO (punches)	WLF W.A.R.S. 65	June 28, 2023	2	1:07	Zhengzhou, China	
Win	1–0	Yu Haiming	KO (punch and head kick)	WLF W.A.R.S. 64	May 17, 2023	1	1:11	Zhengzhou, China	Light Heavyweight debut.

== Kickboxing record ==
Kickboxing record
18 Wins (14 (T)KO's), 3 Losses, 0 Draw, 0 No Contest
Date	Result	Opponent	Event	Location	Method	Round	Time
2024-09-29	Win	(Iran) Mahmoud Sattari	K-1 World MAX 2024	Tokyo, Japan	Decision (Majority)	3	3:00
Defends the K-1 Cruiserweight (-90kg) title.
2024-03-20	Win	(Iran) Sina Karimian	K-1 World MAX 2024 - World Tournament Opening Round	Tokyo, Japan	KO (Right hook)	3	2:03
Wins the K-1 Cruiserweight (-90kg) title.
2024-01-27	Win	(Romania) Sebastian Lutaniuc	Wu Lin Feng 2024: 12th Global Kung Fu Festival	Tangshan, China	TKO (3 Knockdowns/Low kick)	1	2:48
Wins the vacant ISKA K-1 Intercontinental Super-cruiserweight (-95kg) title.
2023-12-09	Win	(Japan) Seiya Tanigawa	K-1 ReBIRTH 2	Osaka, Japan	KO (Right cross)	1	2:38
2023-09-10	Win	(Italy) Claudio Istrate	K-1 World GP 2023: ReBOOT～K-1 ReBIRTH～, Tournament Final	Yokohama, Japan	KO (Right low kick)	1	0:45
Won the 2023 K-1 30th Anniversary Openweight Grand Prix.
2023-09-10	Win	(Brazil) Ariel Machado	K-1 World GP 2023: ReBOOT～K-1 ReBIRTH～, Tournament Semifinal	Yokohama, Japan	KO (Right low kicks)	2	1:57
2023-09-10	Win	(Romania) Valentin Bordianu	K-1 World GP 2023: ReBOOT～K-1 ReBIRTH～, Tournament Quarterfinal	Yokohama, Japan	KO (Right hook)	1	1:36
2023-02-04	Win	(Serbia) Nemanja Knežić	Wu Lin Feng 2023: Chinese New Year	Tangshan, China	TKO (Right low kick)	2	2:13
2021-12-25	Win	(China) Zhou Xuanwei	Wu Lin Feng	China	KO (Right knee to the head)	2	2:30
2021-09-25	Win	(Brazil) Renato Lopes	Wu Lin Feng 2021: WLF in Tangshan	Tangshan, China	Decision (Unanimous)	3	3:00
2021-07-03	Loss	(China) Feng Rui	Wu Lin Feng 2021: World Contender League 5th Stage	Zhengzhou, China	Decision (Unanimous)	3	3:00
2021-04-24	Win	(Brazil) Renato Lopes	Wu Lin Feng 2021: World Contender League 2nd Stage	Zhengzhou, China	TKO (Punches)	3	0:58
2021-03-27	Win	(China) Zhang Caibao	Wu Lin Feng 2021: World Contender League 1st Stage	Zhengzhou, China	KO (Right low kick)	1	2:38
2020-12-22	Win	(China) Zhou Wei	Wu Lin Feng 2020: Women's 52kg Championship Tournament	Zhengzhou, China	Decision (Unanimous)	3	3:00
2020-11-27	Win	(Uzbekistan) Sado	Glory of Heroes 47	Meishan, China	TKO (Right low kick)	1	
2020-01-04	Win	(Serbia) Miloš Bajović	Glory of Heroes 45	Shenzhen, China	KO (Right straight)	1	
2019-12-24	Win	(Greece) Giorgios Mpazakas	Glory of Heroes 43	Greece	KO (Jab)	2	0:43
2019-08-05	Win	(Egypt) Mahmoud Zakareya	Glory of Heroes 40	Cairo, Egypt	TKO (Right hook)	2	
2019-04-16	Win	(New Zealand) Jordan Maroroa	Glory of Heroes 37	Auckland, New Zealand	Decision (Unanimous)	3	3:00
2018-10-12	Loss	(Belarus) Mikita Shostak	Glory of Heroes 35: Meishan	Sichuan, China	Decision (Unanimous)	3	3:00
2018-07-28	Loss	(Netherlands) Marino Schouten	Glory of Heroes 33: Shanghai	Sichuan, China	Decision (Unanimous)	3	3:00
Legend: Win Loss Draw/No contest Notes

== See also ==
- List of male kickboxers
