= Mahmoud Sattari =

Iranian-Japanese kickboxer

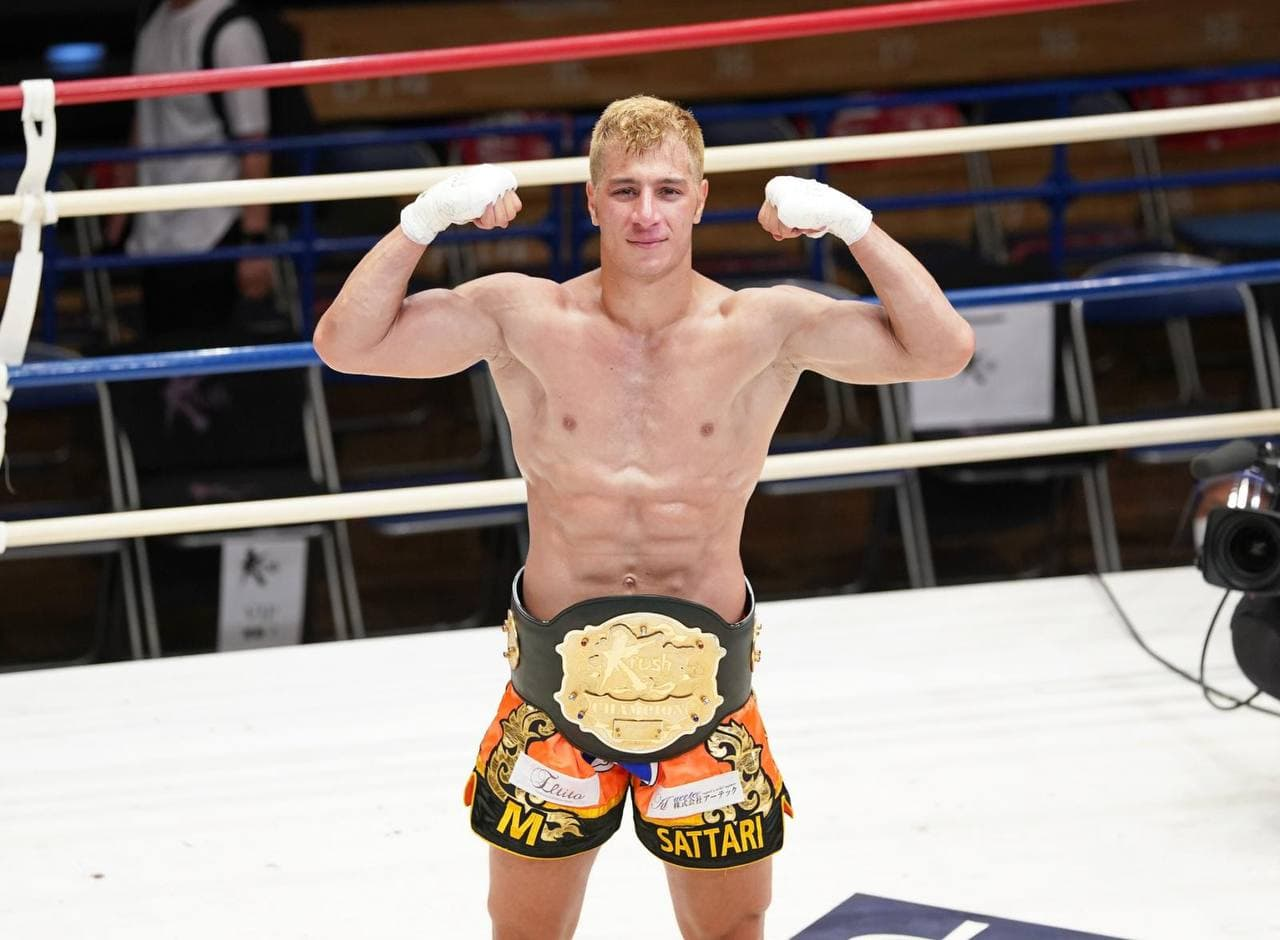
- Sattari in 2021
- Born: Mahmoud Sattari; 22 February 1991 (age 35); Karaj, Iran
- Height: 1.86 m (6 ft 1 in)
- Weight: 90 kg (198 lb; 14 st 2 lb)
- Division: Light Heavyweight; Cruiserweight
- Reach: 190 cm (75 in)
- Style: Muay Thai, Kickboxing
- Team: Team Ota (2021-Present); UFC Gym
- Teachers: Reza Sattari, Valodia Carrero, Darrell Harris
- Years active: 2013-present

Kickboxing record
- Total: 28
- Wins: 23
- By knockout: 14
- Losses: 5
- By knockout: 4

Mahmoud Sattari (Persian: محمود ستاری born 22 February 1991) is an Iranian Muay Thai kickboxer. Sattari is currently under contract with the K-1 Organization.

As of June 2022 he was the #9 ranked Light Heavyweight kickboxer in the world by Combat Press.

== Biography and career ==
Sattari started kickboxing at the age of six. He has won several national championships in the youth category up to adults. Silver medals at the 2014 Asian Beach Games and gold medals the 2017 Asian Indoor and Martial Arts Games are some of his achievements in amateur Muay Thai. Sattari also took part in the 2016 IFMA World Muaythai Championships in Jönköping and the 2017 WAKO World Muaythai Championships in Budapest

Sattari emigrated to Japan in 2020 to participate in professional world leagues. On 17 October 2020, he was able to present himself by defeating Seiya Tanigawa in the Krush organization. On 25 November 2020, he won the M-1 Heavyweight Championship title. On 21 March 2021, he defeated Hisaki Kato in the second round at the Krush organization.

On 24 October 2021, Sattari Won Krush organization World Cruiserweight Title in Grand prix tournament by knocking out Rui Hanazawa and Seiya Tanigawa in the first round. On 26 January 2022, he won the Krush Knockout of the Year 2021 at the K-1 awards.

Sattari faced former DFS Heavyweight Championship challenger Ștefan Lătescu on 3 December 2022 at K-1 World GP 2022 in Osaka.

On 10 September 2023, Sattari took part in the revived K-1 World Grand Prix for the 30th anniversary of the K-1 promotion at K-1 World GP 2023: ReBOOT〜K-1 ReBIRTH〜. In the quarterfinals he faced Claudio Istrate. He lost by first-round knockout.

On 28 January 2026, in response to the high casualty rate of the 2025–2026 Iranian protests, Sattari stated: "36,500 is not a number. It's people's lives. This is not a crime or murder, this is genocide."

== Titles and accoimplishments ==
=== Amateur ===
- Asian Beach Games:
  - (silver) 2014 Asian Beach Games Muay Thai (-81 kg)
- Asian Indoor and Martial Arts Games:
  - (gold) 2017 Asian Indoor and Martial Arts Games Kickboxing Low Kick (-81 kg)

=== Professional ===
- M-1 Weerasakreck Muay Thai
  - 2020 M-1 Heavyweight Champion
- Krush
  - 2021 Krush Cruiserweight (-90 kg) Champion (One successful defense)
  - 2021 Krush Knockout of the Year (vs Animal Koji)
- K-1
  - 2022 K-1 World GP Japan Openweight Tournament Winner

== Kickboxing and Muay Thai record ==
Professional Kickboxing & Muay Thai record
23 Wins (14 (T)KO's), 5 Losses
Date	Result	Opponent	Event	Location	Method	Round	Time
2026-12-29		(Romania) Vasile Corcodel	K-1 World MAX 2026 - World Championship Tournament Final	Yokohama, Japan			
2026-07-20	Win	(Philippines) Akira Jr	K-1 Dontaku 2026	Fukuoka, Japan	KO (Punches)	1	0:26
2026-05-31	Win	(Kazakhstan) Aslan Koshiyev	K-1 Revenge	Tokyo, Japan	Decision (Unanimous)	3	3:00
2026-02-08	Loss	(Germany) Lukas Achterberg	K-1 World GP 2026 - 90kg World Championship Tournament, Quarterfinals	Tokyo, Japan	KO (Left hook)	1	0:51
2025-09-07	Win	(Japan) Shota Yamaguchi	K-1 World MAX 2025 - World Tournament Opening Round	Tokyo, Japan	KO	2	0:38
2025-05-31	Loss	(Netherlands) Thian de Vries	K-1 Beyond	Yokohama, Japan	KO (Left cross)	1	1:04
For the vacant K-1 Cruiserweight (-90kg) title.
2024-09-29	Loss	(China) Liu Ce	K-1 World MAX 2024	Tokyo, Japan	Decision (Majority)	3	3:00
For the K-1 Cruiserweight (-90kg) title.
2023-09-10	Loss	(Romania) Claudio Istrate	K-1 World GP 2023: ReBOOT〜K-1 ReBIRTH〜 World Grand Prix, Quarterfinals	Yokohama, Japan	TKO (2 Knockdowns/Punches)	1	2:19
2022-12-03	Loss	(Romania) Ștefan Lătescu	K-1 World GP 2022 in Osaka	Osaka, Japan	TKO (Punches)	2	1:37
2022-06-19	Win	(Japan) Yuta Uchida	THE MATCH 2022	Tokyo, Japan	KO (Left hook)	1	1:19
2022-04-03	Win	(Japan) Seiya Tanigawa	K-1: K'Festa 5, Openweight Grand Prix Final	Tokyo, Japan	TKO (3 Knockdowns)	3	0:17
Wins K-1 World GP Openweight Tournament.
2022-04-03	Win	(Japan) Kyotaro	K-1: K'Festa 5, Openweight Grand Prix Semi Finals	Tokyo, Japan	Decision (Majority)	3	3:00
2022-04-03	Win	(Japan) K-Jee	K-1: K'Festa 5, Openweight Grand Prix Quarter Finals	Tokyo, Japan	KO (Left hook)	1	1:28
2021-12-18	Win	(Japan) Animal Koji	Krush 132	Tokyo, Japan	KO (Left Hook)	1	0:30
Defends Krush Cruiserweight Title.
2021-07-24	Win	(Japan) Seiya Tanigawa	Krush 127	Tokyo, Japan	TKO (Right hook)	1	2:44
Wins the vacant Krush Cruiserweight title.
2021-07-24	Win	(Japan) Rui Hanazawa	Krush 127	Tokyo, Japan	TKO (Right hook)	1	2:14
2021-03-21	Win	(Japan) Hisaki Kato	K'Festa 4: Day 1	Tokyo, Japan	TKO (Knee & Punches)	2	0:26
2020-11-28	Win	(Japan) Kenta Mori	Kodo-The Move	Tokyo, Japan	TKO (Three Knockdown Rule)	1	1:43
Wins the vacant M-1 World Heavyweight title.
2020-10-17	Win	(Japan) Seiya Tanigawa	Krush 118	Tokyo, Japan	KO (Right hook)	2	2:44
2019-06-28	Win	(Turkey) Ahmet Kilic	KOK World Series Sakarya	Sakarya, Turkey	TKO (Body kick)	1	1:16
Legend: Win Loss Draw/No contest Notes

Amateur Kickboxing & Muay Thai record
Date	Result	Opponent	Event	Location	Method	Round	Time
2019-08-30	Loss	(Saudi Arabia) Sultan Momen	2019 Chungju World Martial Arts Masterships - Muay Thai Tournament, Quarterfinals	Chungju, South Korea	Decision (3:0)	3	3:00
2017-09-26	Win	(Uzbekistan) Javokhir Elboev	2017 Asian Indoor and Martial Arts Games - Kickboxing Tournament, Final	Ashgabat, Turkmenistan	Decision (3:0)	3	3:00
Wins 2017 Asian Indoor and Martial Arts Games Kickboxing Low Kick -81kg Gold Medal.
2017-09-25	Win	(Jordan) Mohammad Salama	2017 Asian Indoor and Martial Arts Games - Kickboxing Tournament, Semifinals	Ashgabat, Turkmenistan	Decision (3:0)	3	3:00
2017-09-24	Win	(Turkmenistan) Azamat Jumakulyýew	2017 Asian Indoor and Martial Arts Games - Kickboxing Tournament, Quarterfinals	Ashgabat, Turkmenistan	KO		
2014-11-22	Loss	(Uzbekistan) Kamoljon Kazimov	2014 Asian Beach Games - Muay Thai Tournament, Final	Phuket, Thailand	Decision (5:0)	3	3:00
Wins 2014 Asian Beach Games Muay Thai -81kg Silver Medal.
2014-11-21	Win	(Lebanon) Kassem El-Khatib	2014 Asian Beach Games - Muay Thai Tournament, Semifinals	Phuket, Thailand	Walk over		
2014-11-20	Win	(Jordan) Mohammad Al-Barri	2014 Asian Beach Games - Muay Thai Tournament, Quarterfinals	Phuket, Thailand	Decision (5:0)	3	3:00
2014-11-18	Win	(Kyrgyzstan) Nooruzbek Sovetbekov	2014 Asian Beach Games - Muay Thai Tournament, First Round	Phuket, Thailand	KO		
Legend: Win Loss Draw/No contest Notes

== Mixed rules record ==
Professional record breakdown
1 match	1 win	0 losses
By knockout	1	0

Res.	Record	Opponent	Method	Event	Date	Round	Time	Location	Notes
Win	1-0	Marcus Aurelio	TKO (punches)	Japan Martial Arts Expo	19 October 2024	1		Yokohama, Japan	Ganryujima rules.

== See also ==
- 2021 in K-1
- List of Krush champions
- List of male kickboxers
