= Rosolini =

- Comune
- Comune di Rosolini
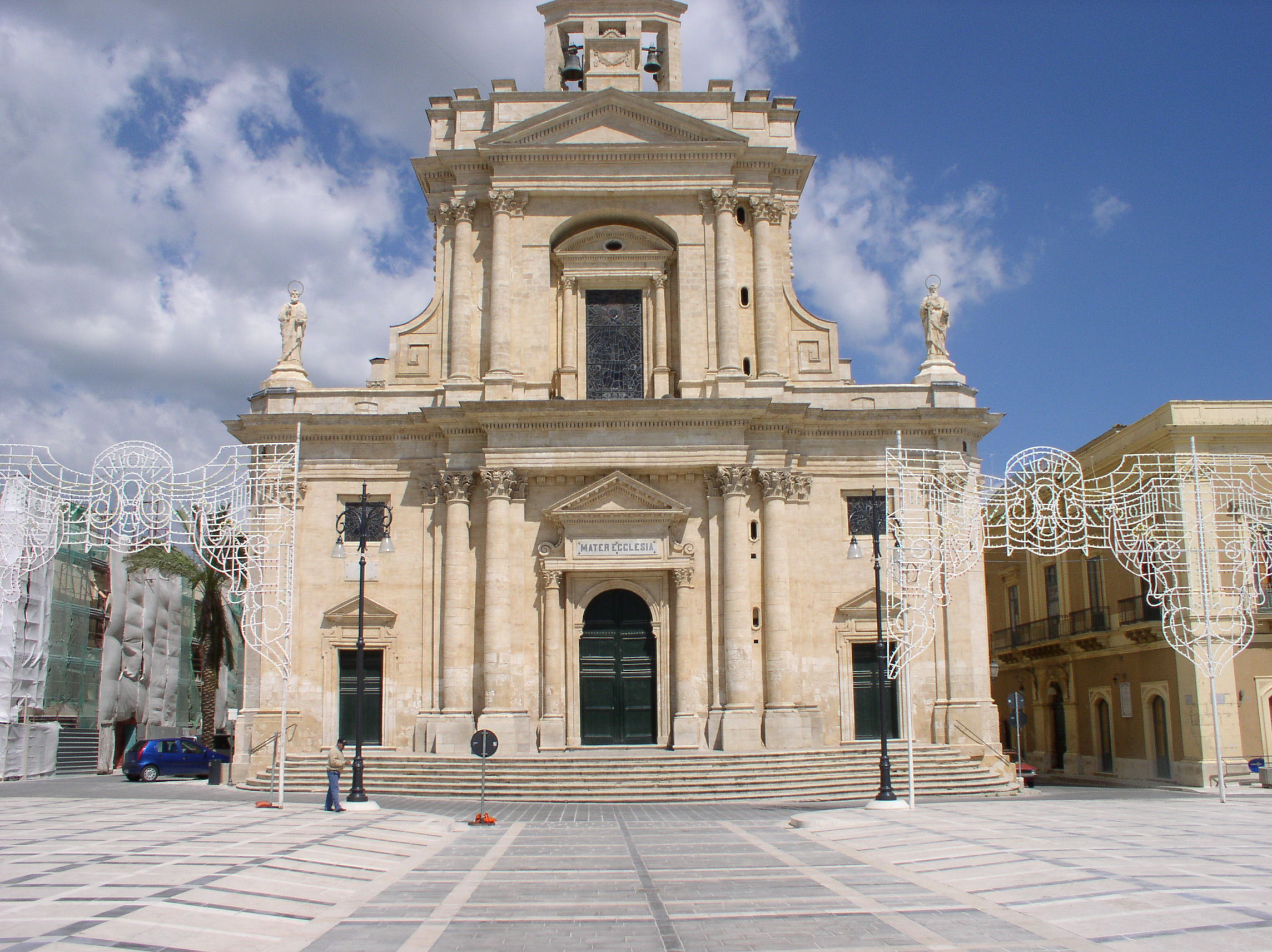

- Location within Italy Location within Sicily
- Coordinates: 36°49′N 14°57′E
- Country: Italy
- Region: Sicily
- Province: Syracuse (SR)

Government
  - Mayor: Giuseppe Incatasciato

Area
  - Total: 76.47 km^{2} (29.53 sq mi)
- Elevation: 154 m (505 ft)

Population (30 November 2017)
  - Total: 21,207
  - Density: 277.3/km^{2} (718.3/sq mi)
- Demonym: Rosolinesi
- Time zone: UTC+1 (CET)
  - Summer (DST): UTC+2 (CEST)
- Postal code: 96019
- Dialing code: 0931
- Website: Official website

Rosolini (Sicilian: Rusalini) is a comune (municipality) in the Province of Syracuse, Sicily, southern Italy. It is about 200 kilometres (120 mi) southeast of Palermo and about 40 kilometres (25 mi) southwest of Syracuse. Rosolini was a town in feudal times, and was a settlement in the late Imperial Roman and Byzantine Empire eras. In the 15th century, Rosolini was a fief of the Platamones. It was the Moncadas, in the year of 1713, which founded the newer town of Rosolini which we see today.

Rosolini borders the following municipalities: Ispica, Modica, Noto, Ragusa.

== Film location ==
In 2014 Rosolini was the main shooting location for the italian movie "Andiamo a quel paese".
