= List of K-1 champions =

This is the list of all K-1 champions. Included are the K-1 World Grand Prix and K-1 World MAX champions as well as all the preliminary tournament winners from the events promoted by FEG (1993– 2012), K-1 Global (2012–2023), and K-1 (2014–present), following the former's dissolution. The list does not contain K-1's mixed martial arts branch Hero's and DREAM champions.

== K-1 World Championship ==
- K-1 FEG (2007 - 2012)

=== K-1 Super Heavyweight Championship ===
==== Weight: ＋100kg ====
Name	Date	Defenses
(Netherlands) Semmy Schilt (def. Ray Sefo)	March 4, 2007	def. Mighty Mo on June 23, 2007; def. Mark Hunt on April 13, 2008; def. Jérôme Le Banner on June 29, 2008; def. Errol Zimmerman on April 3, 2010
Schilt retired from professional competition on June 26, 2013.

=== K-1 Heavyweight Championship ===
==== Weight: −100kg ====
Name	Date	Defenses
(Morocco) Badr Hari (def. Yusuke Fujimoto)	April 28, 2007	def. Glaube Feitosa on June 29, 2008
Hari was stripped of his title on December 17, 2008, for unsportsmanlike behavior.
(Japan) Kyotaro Fujimoto (def. Gökhan Saki)	March 28, 2009	def. Peter Aerts on April 3, 2010
Fujimoto vacated the title on October 1, 2011, in order to pursue a career in professional boxing.

- K-1 World GP Japan (2014–present)

=== K-1 World GP Heavyweight Championship ===
Weight limit: Unlimited

Name	Date	Defenses
(Croatia) Antonio Plazibat (def. Ibrahim El Bouni)	November 23, 2017	
(Netherlands) Roel Mannaart (def. Antonio Plazibat)	March 21, 2018	def. Chris Bradford on November 24, 2019; def. K-Jee on July 13, 2025
(Brazil) Ariel Machado (def. Roel Mannaart)	November 15, 2025	def. Claudio Istrate on April 11, 2026

=== K-1 World GP Cruiserweight Championship ===
Weight limit: 90 kg (198.4 lb)

Name	Date	Defenses
(Iran) Sina Karimian (def. Boubaker El Bakouri)	September 24, 2018	def. Hisaki Kato on March 10, 2019; def. Ryo Aitaka on March 22, 2020
(Japan) K-Jee (def. Sina Karimian)	November 3, 2020	
(Iran) Sina Karimian (def. K-Jee)	March 28, 2021	
(China) Liu Ce (def. Sina Karimian)	March 20, 2024	def. Mahmoud Sattari on September 29, 2024
Liu was stripped of the title on May 26, 2025, after he pulled out of his scheduled title defense due to injury a week before the event.
(Netherlands) Thian de Vries (def. Mahmoud Sattari)	May 31, 2025	

=== K-1 World GP Middleweight Championship ===
Weight limit: 75 kg (165.3 lb)

Name	Date	Defenses
(Turkey) Hasan Toy (def. Shintaro Matsukura)	June 3, 2023	
(Japan) Shintaro Matsukura (def. Hasan Toy)	December 9, 2023	
Matsukura vacated the title on September 2, 2025, when his K-1 contract came to an end.
(Brazil) Dengue Silva (def. Alfousseynou Kamara)	April 11, 2026	

=== K-1 World GP Super Welterweight Championship ===
Weight limit: 70 kg (154.3 lb)

Name	Date	Defenses
(Armenia) Marat Grigorian (def. Jordann Pikeur)	July 4, 2015	
Grigorian was stripped of the title on December 6, 2016, after refusing to defend.
(Belarus) Chingiz Allazov (def. Yasuhiro Kido)	June 18, 2017	def. Hinata Watanabe on March 21, 2018
Allazov vacated the title on February 5, 2019, after signing with Bellator Kickboxing.
(Brazil) Minoru Kimura (def. Hiromi Wajima)	March 22, 2020	
(Japan) Hiromi Wajima (def. Minoru Kimura)	December 4, 2021	def. Jomthong Chuwattana on March 12, 2023; def. Jordann Pikeur on July 17, 2023
(China) Ouyang Feng (def. Hiromi Wajima)	December 9, 2023	def. Darryl Verdonk on May 31, 2025
Ouyang Feng vacated the title on February 17, 2026, after refusing a title defense due to training structure issues.
(Brazil) Jonas Salsicha (def. Darryl Verdonk)	April 11, 2026	

=== K-1 World GP Welterweight Championship ===
Weight limit: 67.5 kg (148.8 lb)

Name	Date	Defenses
(Japan) Yuta Kubo (def. Mohan Dragon)	September 18, 2017	def. Melsik Baghdasaryan on March 21, 2018; def. Yasuhiro Kido on March 10, 2019; def. Jordann Pikeur on March 22, 2020
Kubo retired from the sport on August 20, 2020.
(Japan) Masaaki Noiri (def. Rukiya Anpo)	September 20, 2021	
Noiri vacated the title on March 27, 2024, after departing from the promotion.

=== K-1 World GP Super Lightweight Championship ===
Weight limit: 65 kg (143.3 lb)

Name	Date	Defenses
(Thailand) Kaew Fairtex (def. Yasuomi Soda)	November 3, 2014	def. Minoru Kimura on November 21, 2015; def. Massaro Glunder on March 4, 2016; def. Hideaki Yamazaki on April 22, 2017
(Japan) Masaaki Noiri (def. Kaew Fairtex)	June 18, 2017	
Noiri vacated the title on August 19, 2018, after moving up in weight.
(Thailand) Kaew Fairtex (def. Daizo Sasaki)	November 3, 2018	
(Japan) Rukiya Anpo (def. Kaew Fairtex)	November 3, 2018	def. Kaew Fairtex on December 28, 2019; def. Fukashi Mizutani on March 22, 2020
(Japan) Hideaki Yamazaki (def. Rukiya Anpo)	September 22, 2020	
(Japan) Tetsuya Yamato (def. Hideaki Yamazaki)	April 3, 2022	def. Daizo Sasaki on September 11, 2022; def. Kenta Hayashi on March 12, 2023
Yamato vacated the title on March 8, 2024.
(Thailand) Yodkhunpon Weerasakreck (def. Shu Inagaki)	September 29, 2024	def. Hayato Suzuki on February 9, 2025
Yodkhunpon was stripped of the title on May 30, 2025 after missing weight for his title defense.
(Japan) Taio Asahisa (def. Shu Inagaki)	November 15, 2025	def. Alassane Kamara on September 12, 2026

=== K-1 World GP Lightweight Championship ===
Weight limit: 62.5 kg (137.8 lb)

Name	Date	Defenses
(China) Wei Rui (def. Ren Hiramoto)	February 25, 2017	def. Kongnapa Weerasakreck on June 18, 2017
(Japan) Koya Urabe (def. Wei Rui)	March 21, 2018	
(Japan) Kenta Hayashi (def. Koya Urabe)	March 10, 2019	
(Thailand) Kongnapa Weerasakreck (def. Kenta Hayashi)	December 13, 2020	
(Japan) Taio Asahisa (def. Kongnapa Weerasakreck)	July 17, 2021	
(Japan) Yuki Yoza (def. Taio Asahisa)	March 12, 2023	
Yoza vacated the title on April 18, 2025.
(Japan) Yuzuki Satomi (def. Hirotaka Asahisa)	February 8, 2026	
(Japan) Kiyomitsu Samuel Nagasawa (def. Yuzuki Satomi)	September 12, 2026	

=== K-1 World GP Super Featherweight Championship ===
Weight limit: 60 kg (132.3 lb)

Name	Date	Defenses
(Japan) Koya Urabe (def. Hirotaka Urabe)	January 18, 2015	
(Japan) Hirotaka Urabe (def. Koya Urabe)	November 21, 2015	
(Japan) Taiga Kawabe (def. Hirotaka Urabe)	February 25, 2017	
Taiga was stripped of the title on February 3, 2018, due to contract disputes.
(Japan) Takeru Segawa (def. Kosuke Komiyama)	February 25, 2017	def. Kouzi on December 8, 2018; def. Leona Pettas on March 28, 2021
Takeru vacated the title on June 27, 2022, due to injuries and mental health issues.
(Japan) Leona Pettas (def. Hirotaka Asahisa)	September 11, 2022	
Pettas vacated the title on January 29, 2025.
(France) Rémi Parra (def. Tomoya Yokoyama)	May 31, 2025	
(Japan) Tomoya Yokoyama (def. Yuta Matsuyama for the interim title)	May 31, 2026	
Parra was striped of the belt on July 16, 2026, after failing to present for a title defense for over a year. Interim champion Tomoya Yokoyama was upgraded to full time champion
(Japan) Tomoya Yokoyama —	July 16, 2026	def. Thun Menghong on September 12, 2026

=== K-1 World GP Featherweight Championship ===
Weight limit: 57.5 kg (126.8 lb)

Name	Date	Defenses
(Japan) Takeru Segawa (def. Kaito Ozawa)	November 3, 2016	def. Wang Junguang on September 18, 2017
Takeru vacated the title after moving up in weight.
(Japan) Yuta Murakoshi (def. Haruma Saikyo)	June 17, 2018	def. Hirotaka Urabe on March 10, 2019
Murakoshi vacated the title on August 26, 2019, after moving up in weight.
(Japan) Yuki Egawa (def. Jawsuayai Sor.Dechaphan)	September 24, 2019	
(Japan) Tatsuya Tsubakihara (def. Yuki Egawa)	March 21, 2021	
(Japan) Taito Gunji (def. Tatsuya Tsubakihara)	December 4, 2021	def. View Petchkoson on March 12, 2023
(Japan) Takumi Terada (def. Taito Gunji)	September 29, 2024	def. Takahito Niimi on February 9, 2025
Terada vacated the title on February 20, 2026, in order to move up in weight
(Japan) Ryota Ishida (def. Kosei Sekiguchi)	May 31, 2026	
(Japan) Rui Okubo (def. Ryota Ishida)	September 12, 2026	

=== K-1 World GP Super Bantamweight Championship ===
Weight limit: 55 kg (121.3 lb)

Name	Date	Defenses
(Japan) Takeru Segawa (def. Taiga Kawabe)	April 19, 2015	def. Charles Bongiovanni on November 21, 2015
Takeru vacated the title on August 28, 2016.
(Japan) Yoshiki Takei (def. Kenji Kubo)	April 22, 2017	def. Kenji Kubo on March 21, 2018
Takei vacated the title on December 13, 2020, after transitioning to the sport of boxing.
(Japan) Akihiro Kaneko (def. Masashi Kumura)	February 27, 2022	def. Kompetch Sitsarawatsuer on March 12, 2023; def. Masashi Kumura on September 10, 2023; def. Manolis Kallistis on February 9, 2025; def. Koji Ikeda on September 7, 2025
(Japan) Riamu (def. Akihiro Kaneko)	September 12, 2026	

=== K-1 World GP Bantamweight Championship ===
Weight limit: 53 kg (116.8 lb)

Name	Date	Defenses
(Japan) Toma Kuroda (def. Issei Ishii)	December 3, 2022	def. Issei Ishii on December 9, 2023
Kuroda vacated the title on January 3, 2025.
(Japan) Issei Ishii (def. Eito Kurokawa)	November 15, 2025	def. Zhang Jinhui on February 8, 2026
(Japan) Neigo Katono (def. Issei Ishii)	July 20, 2026	

=== K-1 World GP Women's Flyweight Championship ===
Weight limit: 52 kg (114.6 lb)

Name	Date	Defenses
(Japan) Kana Morimoto (def. Josefine Lindgren Knutsson)	September 28, 2019	def. Souris Manfredi on June 25, 2022; def. Funda Alkayış on March 12, 2023; def. McKenna Wade on July 17, 2023
(Greece) Antonia Prifti (def. Kana Morimoto)	December 9, 2023	
(Japan) Saho Yoshino (def. Antonia Prifti)	March 20, 2024	def. Lara Fernandez on July 13, 2025; def. Sofia Tsolakidou on February 8, 2026; def. Laysa Silva on July 20, 2026

=== K-1 World GP Women's Atomweight Championship ===
Weight limit: 45 kg (99.2 lb)

Name	Date	Defenses
(Thailand) Phayahong Ayothaya (def. Miyuu Sugawara)	June 25, 2022	
(Japan) Miyuu Sugawara (def. Phayahong Ayothaya)	March 12, 2023	
Sugawara vacated the title on December 15, 2024. She announced to be pursuing a career in boxing.
(Japan) Kira Matsutani (def. Aki Suematsu)	February 9, 2025	def. Aki Suematsu on September 7, 2025
(Mexico) Veronica Rodriguez (def. Kira Matsutani)	February 8, 2026	
(Japan) Aki Suematsu (def. Veronica Rodriguez)	July 20, 2026	

== K-1 World Grand Prix Champions ==
=== Openweight ===
- K-1 FEG (1993-2010)
- K-1 (2024–present)

K-1 WORLD GRAND PRIX Champions
Date	Champion	Nationality	Event	Location	Runner-up	Nationality
2024-12-14	Ariel Machado	Brazil	K-1 World Grand Prix 2024 Final	Tokyo, Japan	Feng Rui	China
2010-12-11	Alistair Overeem	Netherlands	K-1 World Grand Prix 2010 Final	Tokyo, Japan	Peter Aerts	Netherlands
2009-12-05	Semmy Schilt	Netherlands	K-1 World Grand Prix 2009 Final	Yokohama, Japan	Badr Hari	Morocco
2008-12-06	Remy Bonjasky	Netherlands	K-1 World Grand Prix 2008 Final	Yokohama, Japan	Badr Hari	Morocco
2007-12-08	Semmy Schilt	Netherlands	K-1 World Grand Prix 2007 Final	Yokohama, Japan	Peter Aerts	Netherlands
2006-12-02	Semmy Schilt	Netherlands	K-1 World Grand Prix 2006 in Tokyo Final	Tokyo, Japan	Peter Aerts	Netherlands
2005-11-19	Semmy Schilt	Netherlands	K-1 World Grand Prix 2005 in Tokyo Final	Tokyo, Japan	Glaube Feitosa	Brazil
2004-12-04	Remy Bonjasky	Netherlands	K-1 World Grand Prix 2004 Final	Tokyo, Japan	Musashi	Japan
2003-12-06	Remy Bonjasky	Netherlands	K-1 World Grand Prix 2003 Final	Tokyo, Japan	Musashi	Japan
2002-12-07	Ernesto Hoost	Netherlands	K-1 World Grand Prix 2002 Final	Tokyo, Japan	Jérôme Le Banner	France
2001-12-08	Mark Hunt	New Zealand	K-1 World Grand Prix 2001 Final	Tokyo, Japan	Francisco Filho	Brazil
2000-12-10	Ernesto Hoost	Netherlands	K-1 World Grand Prix 2000 Final	Tokyo, Japan	Ray Sefo	New Zealand
1999-12-05	Ernesto Hoost	Netherlands	K-1 Grand Prix '99 Final Round	Tokyo, Japan	Mirko Filipović	Croatia
1998-12-13	Peter Aerts	Netherlands	K-1 Grand Prix '98 Final Round	Tokyo, Japan	Andy Hug	Switzerland
1997-11-09	Ernesto Hoost	Netherlands	K-1 Grand Prix '97 Final	Tokyo, Japan	Andy Hug	Switzerland
1996-05-06	Andy Hug	Switzerland	K-1 Grand Prix '96	Yokohama, Japan	Mike Bernardo	South Africa
1995-05-04	Peter Aerts	Netherlands	K-1 Grand Prix '95	Tokyo, Japan	Jérôme Le Banner	France
1994-04-30	Peter Aerts	Netherlands	K-1 Grand Prix '94	Tokyo, Japan	Masaaki Satake	Japan
1993-04-30	Branko Cikatić	Croatia	K-1 Grand Prix '93	Tokyo, Japan	Ernesto Hoost	Netherlands

=== K-1 World Grand Prix: Finalists ===
- K-1 FEG (1993-2010)
- K-1 (2024–present)

K-1 WORLD GRAND PRIX FINAL
Fighter	Best result	Previous appearances in GP Final	Record (W-L-D-NC)
(Croatia) Branko Cikatić	Champions 1993	1993, 1994	87-11-1-1
(Japan) Masaaki Satake	Runner-up 1994	1993, 1994, 1995, 1997, 1998	43-12-4-0
(Netherlands) Peter Aerts	Champions 1994, 1995, 1998	1993, 1994, 1995, 1996, 1997, 1998, 1999, 2000, 2001, 2002, 2003, 2004, 2005, 2006, 2007, 2008, 2010	108-35-2-0
(United States) Maurice Smith	3rd place 1993	1993	53-13-5-0
(Thailand) Changpuek Kiatsongrit	Quarter Finals 1993	1993	277-99-5-0
(United States) Todd Hays	Quarter Finals 1993	1993	11-1
(Netherlands) Ernesto Hoost	Champions 1997, 1999, 2000, 2002	1993, 1995, 1996, 1997, 1998, 1999, 2000, 2001, 2002, 2004, 2006	99-21-1-0
(Japan) Toshiyuki Atokawa	Quarter Finals 1993, 1995	1993, 1995	5-10
(United States) Patrick Smith	3rd place 1994	1994	66-8
(Netherlands) Rob van Esdonk	Quarter Finals 1994	1994	8-10
(United Kingdom) Michael Thompson	Quarter Finals 1994	1994	7-6
(Netherlands) Andre Mannaart	Quarter Finals 1994	1994	58-19-5-0
(Switzerland) Andy Hug	Champions 1996	1994, 1996, 1997, 1998, 1999	37-9-1-0
(South Africa) Mike Bernardo	Runner-up 1996	1995, 1996, 1997, 1998	54-18-3-2
(France) Jérôme Le Banner	Runner-up 1995, 2002	1995, 1997, 1999, 2001, 2002, 2005, 2006, 2007, 2008, 2009	87-23-2-1
(Australia) Stan Longinidis	Quarter Finals 1995	1995	88-9-5-1
(Netherlands) John Kleijn	Quarter Finals 1995	1995	1-2
(Australia) Sam Greco	3rd place 1998, 1999	1996, 1997, 1998, 1999	19-9-2-2
(Croatia) Mirko Filipović	Runner-up 1999	1996, 1999, 2000	26-8
(Japan) Musashi	Runner-up 2003, 2004	1996, 1999, 2000, 2002, 2003, 2004, 2005	49-30-5-1
(South Africa) Duane Van Der Merwe	Quarter Finals 1996	1996	5-4
(Brazil) Francisco Filho	Runner-up 2001	1997, 1998, 2000, 2001	16-7-2-0
(New Zealand) Ray Sefo	Runner-up 2000	1998, 1999, 2000, 2002, 2003, 2004, 2005	56-22-1-0
(France) Cyril Abidi	3rd place 2000, 2003	2000, 2003	25-16
(Germany) Stefan Leko	3rd place 2001	2000, 2001, 2002, 2006	69-39-1-1
(New Zealand) Mark Hunt	Champions 2001	2001, 2002	30-13
(Denmark) Nicholas Pettas	Quarter Finals 2001	2001	9-9
(Belarus) Alexey Ignashov	3rd place 2001	2001, 2003	86-22
(United States) Bob Sapp	Quarter Finals 2002	2002	12-19
(South Africa) Francois Botha	3rd place 2004	2003, 2004	4-12
(Australia) Peter Graham	Quarter Finals 2003	2003	59-14-1-0
(Netherlands) Remy Bonjasky	Champions 2003, 2004, 2008	2003, 2004, 2005, 2006, 2007, 2008, 2009	78-20
(Thailand) Kaoklai Kaennorsing	3rd place 2004	2004	88-40-5-1
(United States) Mighty Mo	Quarter Finals 2004, 2010	2004, 2010	20-22
(Netherlands) Semmy Schilt	Champions 2005, 2006, 2007, 2009	2005, 2006, 2007, 2009, 2010	43-6-1-0
(Brazil) Glaube Feitosa	Runner-up 2005	2005, 2006, 2007	17-17-1-0
(Russia) Ruslan Karaev	Quarter Finals 2005, 2006, 2008, 2009	2005, 2006, 2008, 2009	15-9
(South Korea) Choi Hong-man	Quarter Finals 2005, 2007	2005, 2007	13-9
(Germany) Chalid Arrab	Quarter Finals 2006	2006	34-8
(Japan) Junichi Sawayashiki	Quarter Finals 2007	2007	15-8
(Morocco) Badr Hari	Runner-up 2008, 2009	2007, 2008, 2009	80-17-0-3
(Brazil) Ewerton Teixeira	Quarter Finals 2008, 2009	2008, 2009	11-4
(Turkey) Gökhan Saki	3rd place 2008, 2010	2008, 2010	82-16-0-1
(Netherlands) Errol Zimmerman	3rd place 2008, 2024	2008, 2009, 2024	87-31-0-1
(Netherlands) Alistair Overeem	Champions 2010	2009, 2010	10-4-0-1
(Romania) Daniel Ghiță	Quarter Finals 2010	2010	52-11
(Japan) Kyotaro	Quarter Finals 2010	2010	21-7
(Suriname) Tyrone Spong	Quarter Finals 2010	2010	107-7-1-1
(Brazil) Ariel Machado	Champions 2024	2024	63-14
(United Kingdom) Rhys Brudenell	Quarter Finals 2024	2024	25-5
(Japan) Shota Yamaguchi	3rd place 2024	2024	8-4
(Italy) Claudio Istrate	Quarter Finals 2024	2024	61-26-3-1
(China) Feng Rui	Runner-up 2024	2024	12-1
(Japan) K-Jee	Quarter Finals 2024	2024	22-19
(Italy) Mattia Faraoni	Quarter Finals 2024	2024	32-6

== K-1 GP Preliminary Tournament Champions ==
K-1 WORLD GP Preliminary Tournament Champions
Date	Champion	Nationality	Event	Location	Runner-up	Nationality
2024
2024-08-24	Ariel Machado	Brazil	K-1 World GP 2024 in Brasília	Brasília, Brazil	Jhonny Klever	Brazil
2024-07-27	Rhys Brudenell	United Kingdom	K-1 World GP 2024 in Sicily	Rosolini, Italy	Florin Ivănoaie	Romania
2024-06-29	Miloš Cvjetićanin	Serbia	K-1 World GP 2024 in Sarajevo	Sarajevo, Bosnia and Herzegovina	Nidal Bchiri	Morocco
2023
2023-09-10	Liu Ce	China	K-1 World GP 2023: ReBOOT～K-1 ReBIRTH～	Yokohama, Japan	Claudio Istrate	Italy
2022
2022-04-03	Mahmoud Sattari	Iran	K-1: K'Festa 5	Tokyo, Japan	Seiya Tanigawa	Japan
2010
2010-07-10	Ben Edwards	Australia	K-1 World Grand Prix 2010 in Canberra	Canberra, Australia	Paul Slowinski	Australia
2010-05-21	Freddy Kemayo	France	K-1 World Grand Prix 2010 in Bucharest	Bucharest, Romania	Sebastian Ciobanu	Romania
2010-04-24	Konstantin Gluhov	Latvia	K-1 World Grand Prix Selection 2010	Istanbul, Turkey	Vitaly Shemetov	Russia
2010-04-10	Mindaugas Sakalauskas	Lithuania	K-1 World Grand Prix 2010 in Vilnius	Vilnius, Lithuania	Andrei Bokan	Estonia
2010-03-28	Daniil Sapljoshin	Estonia	K-1 World Grand Prix 2010 in Warsaw	Warsaw, Poland	Tomasz Sarara	Poland
2010-03-27	Agron Preteni	Croatia	K-1 ColliZion 2010 Croatia	Split, Croatia	James Phillips	Germany
2010-01-29	Nicolas Wamba	France	K-1 Rules Kick Tournament 2010 in Marseilles	Marseilles, France	Fabrice Aurieng	Réunion
2009
2009-12-12	Roman Kleibl	Czech Republic	K-1 ColliZion 2009 Final Tournament	Prague, Czech Republic	Mladen Brestovac	Croatia
2009-11-21	Andrei Bokan	Estonia	K-1 Europe Grand Prix 2009 in Tallinn	Tallinn, Estonia	Tarmo Rakaselg	Estonia
2009-09-21	Mihaita Golescu	Romania	K-1 ColliZion 2009 Romania qualification round	Ploiești, Romania	Andrei Dumitru	Romania
2009-08-11	Daniel Ghita	Romania	K-1 World Grand Prix 2009 in Tokyo Final 16 Qualifying GP	Tokyo, Japan	Sergei Lascenko	Ukraine
2009-08-02	Singh Jaideep	India	K-1 World Grand Prix 2009 in Seoul	Seoul, South Korea	Taiei Kin	Japan
2009-06-06	Damián García	Spain	K-1 Spain Battles 2009	Barcelona, Spain	Frank Muñoz	Spain
2009-05-23	Zabit Samedov	Belarus	K-1 World Grand Prix 2009 in Łódź	Łódź, Poland	Sergei Lascenko	Ukraine
2009-05-16	Mladen Brestovac	Croatia	K-1 ColliZion 2009 Mladá Boleslav	Mladá Boleslav, Czech Republic	Lubomir Suda	Czech Republic
2009-03-21	James Phillips	Germany	K-1 ColliZion 2009 Croatia	Split, Croatia	Patrick Berger	Austria
2009-02-28	Mladen Brestovac	Croatia	K-1 Rules Tournament 2009 in Budapest	Budapest, Hungary	Sebastian Ciobanu	Romania
2008
2008-12-20	Ashwin Balrak	Suriname	K-1 Fighting Network Prague 2008	Prague, Czech Republic	Shamil Abasov	Russia
2008-11-22	Konstantin Gluhov	Latvia	K-1 World Grand Prix 2008 in Riga	Riga, Latvia	Mindaugas Sakalauskas	Lithuania
2008-08-19	Dénes Rácz	Hungary	K-1 Rules Tournament 2008 in Hungary	Debrecen, Hungary	Dániel Török	Hungary
2008-08-09	Gökhan Saki	Turkey	K-1 World Grand Prix 2008 in Hawaii	Honolulu, Hawaii	Randy Kim	South Korea
2008-07-13	Ruslan Karaev	Russia	K-1 World Grand Prix 2008 in Taipei	Taipei City, Taiwan	Aleksandr Pitchkounov	Russia
2008-06-29	Ewerton Teixeira	Brazil	K-1 World Grand Prix 2008 in Fukuoka	Fukuoka, Japan	Keijiro Maeda	Japan
2008-05-17	Mladen Brestovac	Croatia	K-1 Fighting Network Austria 2008	Vienna, Austria	Roman Kleibl	Czech Republic
2008-04-26	Errol Zimmerman	Netherlands	K-1 World Grand Prix 2008 in Amsterdam	Amsterdam, Netherlands	Zabit Samedov	Belarus
2008-04-12	Reamon Welboren	Netherlands	K-1 Warriors 2008	Lübeck, Germany	Christian Lüdeke	Germany
2007
2007-12-15	Dževad Poturak	(Bosnia and Herzegovina) Bosnia	K-1 Fighting Network Prague 2007	Prague, Czech Republic	Roman Kleibl	Czech Republic
2007-11-02	Vitor Miranda	Brazil	K-1 Fighting Network Turkey 2007	Istanbul, Turkey	Karl Glyschinsky	Germany
2007-10-13	Sergei Gur	Belarus	K-1 Fighting Network Latvia 2007	Riga, Latvia	Mindaugas Sakalauskas	Lithuania
2007-08-19	Dániel Török	Hungary	K-1 Fighting Network Hungary 2007	Debrecen, Hungary	Souleimane Konate	France
2007-08-11	Doug Viney	New Zealand	K-1 World Grand Prix 2007 in Las Vegas	Las Vegas, Nevada, USA	Zabit Samedov	Belarus
2007-08-05	Yusuke Fujimoto	Japan	K-1 World Grand Prix 2007 in Hong Kong	Hong Kong	Wang Qiang	China
2007-06-23	Paul Slowinski	Australia	K-1 World Grand Prix 2007 in Amsterdam	Amsterdam, Netherlands	Björn Bregy	Switzerland
2007-06-09	Łukasz Jarosz	Poland	K-1 Rules Heavyweight Tournament 2007 in Poland	Nowy Targ, Poland	Marcin Rozalski	Poland
2007-05-19	Nathan Corbett	Australia	K-1 Fighting Network Scandinavian Qualification 2007	Stockholm, Sweden	Ashwin Balrak	Suriname
2007-05-04	Brecht Wallis	Belgium	K-1 Fighting Network Romania 2007	Bucharest, Romania	Paula Mataele	Tonga
2007-04-28	Mighty Mo	United States	K-1 World Grand Prix 2007 in Hawaii	Honolulu, Hawaii	Aleksandr Pitchkounov	Russia
2007-04-14	Tomáš Hron	Czech Republic	K-1 Italy Oktagon 2007	Milan, Italy	Sergei Gur	Belarus
2007-03-17	Jan Müller	Czech Republic	K-1 Rules European Warriors 2007	Lübeck, Germany	Alexander Novovic	Croatia
2007-03-10	James Phillips	Germany	K-1 Fighting Network Croatia 2007	Split, Croatia	Ante Varnica	Croatia
2007-02-24	Maxsim Neledva	Ukraine	K-1 European League 2007 Hungary	Budapest, Hungary	Dzevad Poturak	(Bosnia and Herzegovina) Bosnia-Herzegovina
2007-01-26	Zabit Samedov	Belarus	K-1 Rules Kick Tournament 2007 in Marseilles	Marseilles, France	Grégory Tony	France
2007-01-13	Magomed Magomedov	Russia	K-1 Rules Heavyweight Tournament 2007 in Turkey	Istanbul, Turkey	Kaoklai Kaennorsing	Thailand
2007
2006-12-16	Magomed Magomedov	Russia	K-1 Fighting Network Prague Round '07	Prague, Czech Republic	Petar Majstorovic	Switzerland
2006-11-04	Zabit Samedov	Belarus	K-1 Fighting Network Riga 2006	Riga, Latvia	Maksim Neledva	Ukraine
2006-10-15	John Love	United Kingdom	K-1 Rules "First Step Road To Tokyo" 2006	Birmingham, England	Steve Hamilton	United Kingdom
2006-08-18	Zabit Samedov	Belarus	K-1 Hungary 2006	Debrecen, Hungary	Marko Tomasović	Croatia
2006-08-12	Stefan Leko	Germany	K-1 World Grand Prix 2006 in Las Vegas II	Las Vegas, Nevada, USA	Michael McDonald	Canada
2006-06-17	Humberto Evora	Portugal	K-1 Canarias 2006	Santa Cruz de Tenerife, Canary Islands	Rodney Faverus	Netherlands
2006-06-03	Yusuke Fujimoto	Japan	K-1 World Grand Prix 2006 in Seoul	Seoul, South Korea	Min-Soo Kim	South Korea
2006-05-26	Igor Jurković	Croatia	K-1 Rules "Le Grand Tournoi" 2006	Paris, France	Magomed Magomedov	Russia
2006-05-20	Magomed Magomedov	Russia	K-1 Scandinavia Grand Prix 2006	Stockholm, Sweden	Rickard Nordstrand	Sweden
2006-05-13	Bjorn Bregy	Switzerland	K-1 World Grand Prix 2006 in Amsterdam	Amsterdam, Netherlands	Gokhan Saki	Turkey
2006-04-29	Chalid Arrab	Germany	K-1 World Grand Prix 2006 in Las Vegas	Las Vegas, Nevada	Gary Goodridge	Trinidad and Tobago
2006-04-08	Sergei Gur	Belarus	K-1 Italy Oktagon 2006	Milan, Italy	Dzevad Poturak	(Bosnia and Herzegovina) Bosnia
2006-03-05	Paul Slowinski	Australia	K-1 World Grand Prix 2006 in Auckland	Auckland, New Zealand	Jason Suttie	New Zealand
2006-02-25	Attila Karacs	Hungary	K-1 European League 2006 in Budapest	Budapest, Hungary	Ante Varnica	Croatia
2006-02-17	Djamal Kasumov	Russia	K-1 European League 2006 in Bratislava	Bratislava, Slovakia	Roman Kupcak	Slovakia
2006-01-20	Alexander Ustinov	Russia	K-1 Fighting Network 2006 in Marseilles	Marseilles, France	Brice Guidon	France
2005
2005-12-10	James Phillips	Germany	K-1 Final Battle 2005	Lübeck, Germany	Asmir Burgic	Germany
2005-10-29	Vukota Mirkovic	Germany	K-1 New Talents 2005 in Germany	Koblenz, Germany	Christian Lüdeke	Germany
2005-10-22	Vitor Miranda	Brazil	K-1 Brazil Grand Prix 2005 in São Paulo	São Paulo, Brazil	Asmir Burgic	Germany
2005-08-19	Attila Karacs	Hungary	K-1 Hungary Grand Prix 2005	Debrecen, Hungary	Patrice Quarteron	France
2005-08-13	Ruslan Karaev	Russia	K-1 World Grand Prix 2005 in Las Vegas II	Las Vegas, Nevada	Scott Lighty	United States
2005-07-29	Gary Goodridge	Trinidad and Tobago	K-1 World Grand Prix 2005 in Hawaii	Honolulu, Hawaii	Yusuke Fujimoto	Japan
2005-06-14	Bob Sapp	United States	K-1 World Grand Prix 2005 in Hiroshima	Hiroshima, Japan	Tatsufumi Tomihira	Japan
2005-05-27	Semmy Schilt	Netherlands	K-1 World Grand Prix 2005 in Paris	Paris, France	Naoufal Benazzouz	France
2005-05-21	Bjorn Bregy	Switzerland	K-1 Scandinavia Grand Prix 2005	Stockholm, Sweden	Gary Turner	United Kingdom
2005-04-30	Glaube Feitosa	Brazil	K-1 World Grand Prix 2005 in Las Vegas	Las Vegas, Nevada	Gary Goodridge	Trinidad and Tobago
2005-04-16	Alexander Ustinov	Russia	K-1 Italy 2005 Oktagon	Milan, Italy	Freddy Kemayo	France
2005-02-02	Henriques Zowa	Angola	K-1 Canarias 2005	Santa Cruz de Tenerife, Canary Islands	Errol Zimmerman	Netherlands
2005-03-19	Choi Hong-man	South Korea	K-1 World Grand Prix 2005 in Seoul	Seoul, South Korea	Kaoklai Kaennorsing	Thailand
2005-03-12	Marcel Donk	Netherlands	K-1 New Talents 2005 in Lübeck	Lübeck, Germany	Bo Saebro	Denmark
2005-01-29	Christian Nka	France	K-1 France Grand Prix 2005 in Marseilles	Marseilles, France	Grégory Tony	France
2004
2004-10-30	Vitor Miranda	Brazil	K-1 Brazil 2004 Challenge	Goiânia, Brazil	Eduardo Maiorino	Brazil
2004-09-11	Vukota Mirkovic	Germany	K-1 New Talents 2004 in Lübeck	Lübeck, Germany	Christian Honold	Germany
2004-08-07	Mighty Mo	United States	K-1 World Grand Prix 2004 in Las Vegas II	Las Vegas, Nevada	Brecht Wallis	Belgium
2004-07-17	Kaoklai Kaennorsing	Thailand	K-1 World Grand Prix 2004 in Seoul	Seoul, South Korea	Shingo Koyasu	Japan
2004-06-26	Hiromi Amada	Japan	K-1 Beast 2004 in Shizuoka	Shizuoka, Japan	Nobu Hayashi	Japan
2004-06-11	Josip Bodrozic	Croatia	K-1 Grand Prix BIH 2004	Siroki Brijeg, Bosnia-Herzegovina	Duško Basrak	Serbia
2004-05-15	Alexander Ustinov	Russia	K-1 Poland 2004	Pruszkow, Poland	Andrei Zuravkov	Belarus
2004-04-30	Michael McDonald	Canada	K-1 World Grand Prix 2004 in Las Vegas I	Las Vegas, Nevada	Dewey Cooper	United States
2004-04-24	Jörgen Kruth	Sweden	K-1 Italy 2004	Milan, Italy	Vitali Akhramenko	Belarus
2004-04-03	Noboru Uchida	Japan	K-1 VSN Cup 2004 Japan GP	Yokohama, Japan	Toru Oishi	Japan
2004-02-22	Gary Turner	United Kingdom	K-1 Battle of Britain 2004	Wolverhampton, England	Nick Sheppard	United Kingdom
2004-02-14	Brecht Wallis	Belgium	K-1 Scandinavia 2004 World Qualification	Stockholm, Sweden	Rickard Nordstrand	Sweden
2004-01-24	Sergei Gur	Belarus	K-1 Marseilles 2004 World Qualification	Marseilles, France	Humberto Evora	Portugal
2003
2003-12-20	Alexander Ustinov	Russia	K-1 Spain Grand Prix 2003 in Barcelona	Barcelona, Spain	Petar Majstorovic	Switzerland
2003-09-21	Musashi	Japan	K-1 Survival 2003 Japan Grand Prix Final	Yokohama, Japan	Yusuke Fujimoto	Japan
2003-08-15	Remy Bonjasky	Netherlands	K-1 World Grand Prix 2003 in Las Vegas II	Las Vegas, Nevada	Michael McDonald	Canada
2003-07-27	Peter Graham	Australia	K-1 World Grand Prix 2003 in Melbourne	Melbourne, Australia	Jason Suttie	New Zealand
2003-06-14	Alexey Ignashov	Belarus	K-1 World Grand Prix 2003 in Paris	Paris, France	Cyril Abidi	France
2003-06-14	Asmir Burgic	Germany	K-1 Germany 2003	Bergheim, Germany	Christian Lüdeke	Germany
2003-05-30	Jerrel Venetiaan	Netherlands	K-1 World Grand Prix 2003 in Basel	Basel, Switzerland	Bjorn Bregy	Switzerland
2003-05-28	Alexander Ustinov	Russia	K-1 World Grand Prix 2003 Preliminary Moscow	Moscow, Russia	Andrei Kirsanov	Russia
2003-05-10	Pavel Majer	Czech Republic	K-1 World Grand Prix 2003 Preliminary Milan	Milan, Italy	Evgeny Orlov	Russia
2003-05-02	Carter Williams	United States	K-1 World Grand Prix 2003 in Las Vegas	Las Vegas, Nevada	Rick Roufus	United States
2003-04-13	Gary Turner	United Kingdom	K-1 World Grand Prix 2003 Preliminary UK	Birmingham, England	Gordon Minors	United Kingdom
2003-04-06	Jörgen Kruth	Sweden	K-1 Holland Grand Prix 2003	Zoetermeer, Netherlands	Samir Benazzouz	Morocco
2003-03-15	Larry Lindwall	Sweden	K-1 World Grand Prix 2003 Preliminary Scandinavia	Stockholm, Sweden	Rob Hanneman	Netherlands
2003-02-23	Jefferson Silva	Brazil	K-1 World Grand Prix 2003 Preliminary Brazil	São Paulo, Brazil	Eduardo Maiorino	Brazil
2003-01-24	Grégory Tony	France	K-1 World Grand Prix 2003 Preliminary France	Paris, France	Azem Maksutaj	Switzerland
2002
2002-12-07	Ante Varnica	Croatia	K-1 Bassano 2002	Milan, Italy	Vitale Mele	Italy
2002-11-08	Jason Suttie	New Zealand	K-1 New Zealand 2002	Auckland, New Zealand	Doug Viney	New Zealand
2002-09-28	Gordan Jukić	Croatia	K-1 Germany 2002	Krefeld, Germany	Franek Lukanowski	Germany
2002-09-22	Musashi	Japan	K-1 Andy Spirits Japan GP 2002 Final	Osaka, Japan	Tsuyoshi Nakasako	Japan
2002-08-17	Michael McDonald	Canada	K-1 World Grand Prix 2002 in Las Vegas	Las Vegas, Nevada	Pavel Majer	Czech Republic
2002-07-07	Andrew Thomson	South Africa	K-1 World Grand Prix 2002 Preliminary South Africa	Pretoria, South Africa	Timmelo Maputha	South Africa
2002-05-04	Andrei Kirsanov	Russia	K-1 World Grand Prix 2002 Preliminary Ukraine	Kyiv, Ukraine	Sergei Ivanovich	Belarus
2002-05-03	Michael McDonald	Canada	K-1 World Grand Prix 2002 Preliminary USA	Las Vegas, Nevada	Rick Roufus	United States
2002-04-20	Petr Vondracek	Czech Republic	K-1 World Grand Prix 2002 Preliminary Italy	Milan, Italy	Peter Varga	Hungary
2002-04-13	Ricardo Dueñas	Spain	K-1 World Grand Prix 2002 Preliminary Spain	Madrid, Spain	Juan Garcia	Spain
2002-04-13	Petar Majstorovic	Switzerland	K-1 World Grand Prix 2002 Preliminary Croatia	Zagreb, Croatia	Xhavit Bajrami	Switzerland
2002-03-24	Nick Murray	United Kingdom	K-1 World Grand Prix 2002 Preliminary UK	Birmingham, England	John Wyatt	United Kingdom
2002-02-24	Errol Parris	Netherlands	K-1 World Grand Prix 2002 Preliminary Netherlands	Arnhem, Netherlands	Darius Grilauskas	Lithuania
2002-02-18	Adam Watt	Australia	K-1 World Grand Prix 2002 Preliminary Melbourne	Melbourne, Australia	Andrew Peck	New Zealand
2002-02-09	Giuseppe DeNatale	Canada	K-1 World Grand Prix 2002 Preliminary North America	Milwaukee, Wisconsin	Kurt Hasley	United States
2002-01-25	Grégory Tony	France	K-1 World Grand Prix 2002 Preliminary Marseilles	Marseilles, France	Azem Maksutaj	Switzerland
2001
2001-12-01	Pavel Majer	Czech Republic	K-1 World Grand Prix 2001 Preliminary Prague	Prague, Czech Republic	Daniel Waciakowski	Czech Republic
2001-10-08	Francisco Filho	Brazil	K-1 World Grand Prix 2001 in Fukuoka Repechage A	Fukuoka, Japan	Lloyd van Dams	Netherlands
2001-10-08	Mark Hunt	New Zealand	K-1 World Grand Prix 2001 in Fukuoka Repechage B	Fukuoka, Japan	Adam Watt	Australia
2001-08-19	Nicholas Pettas	Denmark	K-1 Andy Memorial 2001 Japan GP Final	Saitama, Japan	Musashi	Japan
2001-08-11	Stefan Leko	Germany	K-1 World Grand Prix 2001 in Las Vegas	Las Vegas, Nevada	Peter Aerts	Netherlands
2001-07-21	Doug Viney	New Zealand	K-1 New Zealand Grand Prix 2001	Auckland, New Zealand	Rony Sefo	New Zealand
2001-07-20	Alexey Ignashov	Belarus	K-1 World Grand Prix 2001 in Nagoya	Nagoya, Japan	Lloyd van Dams	Netherlands
2001-06-24	Sergei Ivanovich	Belarus	K-1 World Grand Prix 2001 Preliminary Ukraine	Lugansk, Ukraine	Jaroslav Zavorotny	Ukraine
2001-06-16	Ernesto Hoost	Netherlands	K-1 World Grand Prix 2001 in Melbourne	Melbourne, Australia	Matt Skelton	United Kingdom
2001-06-09	Larry Lindwall	Sweden	K-1 World Grand Prix 2001 Preliminary Scandinavia	Copenhagen, Denmark	Antoni Hardonk	Netherlands
2001-06-08	Andrew Thomson	South Africa	K-1 World Grand Prix 2001 Preliminary South Africa	Cape Town, South Africa	Paul Rothman	South Africa
2001-05-20	Petar Majstorovic	Switzerland	K-1 World Grand Prix 2001 Preliminary Germany	Oberhausen, Germany	Attila Fusko	Hungary
2001-05-05	Maurice Smith	United States	K-1 World Grand Prix 2001 Preliminary USA	Las Vegas, Nevada	Michael McDonald	Canada
2001-04-29	Jérôme Le Banner	France	K-1 World Grand Prix 2001 in Osaka	Osaka, Japan	Adam Watt	Australia
2001-04-21	Sergei Gur	Belarus	K-1 Italy Grand Prix 2001 Preliminary	Milan, Italy	Rani Berbachi	France
2001-02-24	Mark Hunt	New Zealand	K-1 World Grand Prix 2001 Preliminary Melbourne	Melbourne, Australia	Peter Graham	Australia
2001-02-04	Jerrel Venetiaan	Netherlands	K-1 Holland GP 2001 in Arnhem	Arnhem, Netherlands	Jörgen Kruth	Sweden
2000
2000-12-22	Pavel Majer	Czech Republic	K-1 Czech 2000	Prague, Czech Republic	Sergey Arhipov	Ukraine
2000-11-19	Phil Fagan	Australia	K-1 Oceania Star Wars 2000	Melbourne, Australia	Chris Chrisopoulides	Australia
2000-11-10	Andrew Peck	New Zealand	K-1 New Zealand 2000	Auckland, New Zealand	Rony Sefo	New Zealand
2000-10-22	Auckland Aumitagi	Samoa	K-1 New South Wales 2000	Sydney, Australia	Hape Nagaronoa	Australia
2000-10-13	Nathan Briggs	Australia	K-1 Queensland 2000	Brisbane, Australia	Matt Samoa	Samoa
2000-10-09	Mike Bernardo	South Africa	K-1 World Grand Prix 2000 in Fukuoka	Fukuoka, Japan	Mirko Filipović	Croatia
2000-09-03	Andrew Thomson	South Africa	K-1 Africa Grand Prix 2000	Cape Town, South Africa	Donovan Luff	South Africa
2000-09-01	Jörgen Kruth	Sweden	K-1 Grand Prix Europe 2000	Zagreb, Croatia	Xhavit Bajrami	Switzerland
2000-08-20	Francisco Filho	Brazil	K-1 World Grand Prix 2000 in Yokohama	Yokohama, Japan	Cyril Abidi	France
2000-08-05	Andrei Dudko	Belarus	K-1 USA Championships 2000	Las Vegas, Nevada	Tomasz Kucharzewski	Canada
2000-07-30	Jérôme Le Banner	France	K-1 World Grand Prix 2000 in Nagoya	Nagoya, Japan	Ernesto Hoost	Netherlands
2000-07-07	Musashi	Japan	K-1 Spirits 2000	Sendai, Japan	Hiromi Amada	Japan
2000-06-24	Alexey Ignashov	Belarus	K-1 Belarus Grand Prix 2000	Minsk, Belarus	Sergey Arhipov	Ukraine
2000-05-20	Frank Otto	Germany	K-1 The Best of German Heavyweight	Duisburg, Germany	Dimitri Alexudis	Greece
2000-05-12	Paris Vasilikos	Greece	K-1 King of the Ring 2000	Bologna, Italy	Sinisa Andrijasevic	Croatia
2000-04-16	Matt Skelton	United Kingdom	K-1 UK Battle of Britain 2000	Birmingham, England	Ricky Nickolson	United Kingdom
2000-02-27	Mark Hunt	New Zealand	K-1 Grand Prix 2000 Oceania	Melbourne, Australia	Phil Fagan	Australia
1999
1999-08-22	Musashi	Japan	K-1 Spirits '99	Tokyo, Japan	Nobu Hayashi	Japan
1999-07-18	Stefan Leko	Germany	K-1 Dream '99	Nagoya, Japan	Samir Benazzouz	Morocco
1999-06-20	Xhavit Bajrami	Switzerland	K-1 Braves '99	Fukuoka, Japan	Lloyd van Dams	Netherlands
1998
1998-08-28	Masaaki Satake	Japan	K-1 Japan Grand Prix '98	Tokyo, Japan	Tsuyoshi Nakasako	Japan
1998-08-07	Rick Roufus	United States	K-1 USA Grand Prix '98	Las Vegas, Nevada	Curtis Schuster	United States
1998-06-06	Stefan Leko	Germany	K-1 Fight Night '98	Zurich, Switzerland	Rob Van Esdonk	Netherlands
1997
1997-07-20	Masaaki Satake	Japan	K-1 Dream '97	Nagoya, Japan	Masashi Suzuki]	Japan

Legend: K-1 World Grand Prix Qualifier

== K-1 World MAX Champions ==
=== -70kg ===
- K-1 FEG (2002-2010)
- K-1 (2024–present)

K-1 WORLD MAX Champions
Date	Champion	Nationality	Event	Location	Runner-up	Nationality
2026-12-29			K-1 World MAX 2026 Final	Yokohama, Japan		
2025-11-15	Jonas Salsicha	Brazil	K-1 World MAX 2025 Final	Tokyo, Japan	Darryl Verdonk	Netherlands
2024-07-07	Stoyan Koprivlenski	Bulgaria	K-1 World MAX 2024 Final	Tokyo, Japan	Viktor Akimov	Russia
2010-11-08	Giorgio Petrosyan	Italy	K-1 World MAX 2010 Final	Tokyo, Japan	Yoshihiro Sato	Japan
2009-10-26	Giorgio Petrosyan	Italy	K-1 World MAX 2009 Final	Yokohama, Japan	Andy Souwer	Netherlands
2008-10-01	Masato	Japan	K-1 World MAX 2008 Final	Tokyo, Japan	Artur Kyshenko	Ukraine
2007-10-03	Andy Souwer	Netherlands	K-1 World MAX 2007 Final	Tokyo, Japan	Masato	Japan
2006-06-30	Buakaw Por. Pramuk	Thailand	K-1 World MAX 2006 Final	Yokohama, Japan	Andy Souwer	Netherlands
2005-07-20	Andy Souwer	Netherlands	K-1 World MAX 2005 Final	Yokohama, Japan	Buakaw Por. Pramuk	Thailand
2004-07-07	Buakaw Por. Pramuk	Thailand	K-1 World MAX 2004 Final	Tokyo, Japan	Masato	Japan
2003-07-05	Masato	Japan	K-1 World MAX 2003 Final	Saitama, Japan	Albert Kraus	Netherlands
2002-05-11	Albert Kraus	Netherlands	K-1 World MAX 2002 Final	Tokyo, Japan	Kaolan Kaovichit	Thailand

=== K-1 World MAX: Finalists ===
- K-1 FEG (2002-2010)
- K-1 (2024–present)

K-1 WORLD MAX FINAL
Fighter	Best result	Previous appearances in Max Final	Record (W-L-D-NC)
(Netherlands) Albert Kraus	Champions 2002	2002, 2003, 2004, 2005, 2006, 2007, 2009, 2010	115-30-3-0
(Japan) Takayuki Kohiruimaki	3rd place 2002, 2004	2002, 2004, 2005, 2006	40-20-2-0
(United States) Duane Ludwig	3rd place 2003	2002, 2003	14-7-1-0
(Switzerland) Marino Deflorin	Quarter-finals 2002	2002	24-10
(New Zealand) Shane Chapman	Quarter-finals 2002	2002	65-18-5-1
(Japan) Masato	Champions 2003, 2008	2002, 2003, 2004, 2005, 2006, 2007, 2008	55-6-2-0
(Thailand) Kaolan Kaovichit	Runner-up 2002	2002	101-20-2-0
(China) Zhang Jiapo	Quarter-finals 2002	2002	62-11
(Brazil) Marfio Canoletti	Quarter-finals 2003	2003	47-18
(Greece) Mike Zambidis	3rd place 2010	2003, 2004, 2005, 2007, 2010	157-24
(Netherlands) Andy Souwer	Champions 2005, 2007	2003, 2005, 2006, 2007, 2008, 2009	161-21-2-0
(Thailand) Sakeddaw Kiatputon	3rd place 2003	2003	25-4
(Japan) Kozo Takeda	Quarter-finals 2003	2003	45-20-7-0
(Australia) John Wayne Parr	Quarter-finals 2004, 2005	2004, 2005	99-30-2-0
(Russia) Shamil Gaidarbekov	Quarter-finals 2004	2004	27-6
(Thailand) Buakaw Banchamek	Champions 2004, 2006	2004, 2005, 2006, 2007, 2008, 2009, 2024	246-25-14-2
(Mongolia) Jadamba Narantungalag	Quarter Finals 2004, 2005	2004, 2005	4-6
(Japan) Kazuya Yasuhiro	3rd place 2005	2005	7-13
(Armenia) Gago Drago	3rd place 2006, 2010	2006, 2007, 2008, 2009, 2010	76-26-4-2
(South Africa) Virgil Kalakoda	Quarter Finals 2006	2006	10-10
(Japan) Yoshihiro Sato	Runner-up 2010	2006, 2007, 2008, 2010	54-25-1-0
(Ukraine) Artur Kyshenko	Runner-up 2008	2007, 2008, 2009	72-14-1-2
(South Africa) Warren Stevelmans	Quarter Finals 2008	2008	59-34-5-0
(Japan) Yasuhiro Kido	Quarter Finals 2008	2008	60-27-2-1
(Netherlands) Nieky Holzken	Quarter Finals 2009	2009	95-18-0-1
(Japan) Yuya Yamamoto	3rd place 2009	2009	35-28-1-0
(Italy) Giorgio Petrosyan	Champions 2009, 2010	2009, 2010	109-3-2-2
(Japan) Yuichiro Nagashima	Quarter Finals 2010	2010	21-18-2-0
(Morocco) Mohammed Khamal	Quarter Finals 2010	2010	48-10-3-0
(Poland) Michał Głogowski	Quarter Finals 2010	2010	21-5-1-0
(Bulgaria) Stoyan Koprivlenski	Champions 2024	2024, 2025	28-11
(Brazil) Dengue Silva	3rd place 2024	2024	49-7
(Netherlands) Darryl Verdonk	Runner-up 2025	2024, 2025	18-10
(Russia) Viktor Akimov	Runner-up 2024	2024	13-7
(Suriname) Romano Bakboord	Quarter Finals 2024	2024	19-8-1-0
(Poland) Kacper Muszyński	Quarter Finals 2024	2024	29-3-1-0
(Armenia) Zhora Akopyan	Quarter Finals 2024, 2025	2024, 2025	34-7
(Spain) Sergio Sanchez	3rd place 2024	2024	95-19
(China) Ouyang Feng	Quarter Finals 2025	2025	47-4-0-1
(France) Aymeric Lazizi	Quarter Finals 2025	2025	23-3-1-0
(Thailand) Hercules WanKongOhm.WKO	Quarter Finals 2025	2025	63-23
(Senegal) Alassane Kamara	Quarter Finals 2025	2025	15-3
(Brazil) Jonas Salsicha	Champions 2025	2025	29-4
(Samoa) Jonathan Aiulu	3rd place 2025	2025	37-9-1-0

== K-1 MAX Preliminary Tournament Champions ==
K-1 WORLD MAX Preliminary Tournament Champions
Date	Champion	Nationality	Event	Location	Runner-up	Nationality
2026
2026-11-27			K-1 Fighting Network in France 2026	Dijon, France		
2026-11-27			K-1 Fighting Network in Armenia 2026	Yerevan, Armenia		
2026-06-21	Jones Coliseu	Brazil	K-1 World MAX 2026 São Paulo	São Paulo, Brazil	André Martins	Brazil
2026-05-16	Sergio Sanchez	Spain	K-1 World MAX 2026 Canary Islands	Canary Islands, Spain	Fabio Veiga	Portugal
2026-04-25	Vladimir Tulaev	Russia	K-1 World MAX 2026 Yekaterinburg	Yekaterinburg, Russia	Rostislav Varnavsky	Russia
2026-04-19	Jayjay Morris	Netherlands	K-1 World MAX 2026 Utrecht	Utrecht, Netherlands	Mitchell Lammers	Netherlands
2026-04-18	Achilleas Karapiperis	Greece	K-1 World MAX 2026 Athens	Athens, Greece	Nikolaos Livanos	Greece
2026-04-18	Zack Pankhurst	Australia	K-1 World MAX 2026 Melbourne	Melbourne, Australia	Preston Te Moni	New Zealand
2026-04-03	Serhiy Adamchuk	Ukraine	K-1 World MAX 2026 Bucharest	Bucharest, Romania	Vitalie Matei	Moldova
2025
2025-11-29	Lorenzo Di Vara	Italy	K-1 World MAX Europe - Oktagon Roma	Rome, Italy	Taras Hnatchuk	Ukraine
2025-06-28	Jonas Salsicha	Brazil	K-1 World MAX 2025 - South American Round	São José dos Pinhais, Brazil	André Martins	Brazil
2011
2011-09-25	Yūji Nashiro	Japan	K-1 World MAX 2011 -70kg Japan Tournament Final	Osaka, Japan	Yuya Yamamoto	Japan
2011-01-08	Rafi Zouheir	Spain	K-1 MAX Madrid 2011	Madrid, Spain	Warren Stevelmans	South Africa
2010
2010-03-27	Yuichiro Nagashima	Japan	K-1 World MAX 2010 -70kg Japan Tournament	Saitama, Japan	Hiroki Nakajima	Japan
2010-03-21	Mohammed Khamal	Morocco	K-1 World MAX 2010 West Europe Tournament	Utrecht, Netherlands	Harut Grigorian	Armenia
2010-03-19	Vitaly Gurkov	Belarus	K-1 World MAX 2010 East Europe Tournament	Minsk, Belarus	Zamin Guseynov	Azerbaijan
2010-02-06	Philippe Salmon	France	K-1 ColliZion MAX 2010 Europe GP	Budapest, Hungary	Mihai Barbu	Romania
2009
2009-09-21	Mihai Barbu	Romania	K-1 ColliZion 2009 Romania qualification round	Ploiești, Romania	Adrian Mitu	Romania
2009-07-04	Daniel Montesdeoca	Spain	K-1 MAX Canarias 2009	Santa Cruz de Tenerife, Spain	Jonay Risco	Spain
2009-06-06	Manzy Pauwels	Spain	K-1 Spain Battles 2009	Barcelona, Spain	Bouchaib El Bilali	Morocco
2009-05-16	Erol Tunkay	Germany	K-1 ColliZion 2009 Mladá Boleslav	Mladá Boleslav, Czech Republic	Jan Kališ	Czech Republic
2009-03-21	Frane Radic	Croatia	K-1 ColliZion 2009 Croatia	Split, Croatia	Jose Barradas	Portugal
2009-03-20	Chi Bin Lim	(South Korea) Korea	K-1 Award & MAX Korea 2009	Seoul, South Korea	Su Hwan Lee	(South Korea) Korea
2009-03-01	Leroy Kaestner	Netherlands	K-1 World MAX 2009 Europe Tournament	Utrecht, Netherlands	Marco Pique	Suriname
2009-02-28	Roland Vörös	Hungary	K-1 Hungary MAX 2009	Budapest, Hungary	Viktor Pethes	Hungary
2009-02-24	Taishin Kohiruimaki	Japan	K-1 World MAX 2009 Japan Tournament	Tokyo, Japan	Yuya Yamamoto	Japan
2008
2008-08-19	Norbert Balogh	Hungary	K-1 Rules Tournament 2008 in Hungary	Debrecen, Hungary	Klaudius Herczer	Hungary
2008-06-07	Roland Vörös	Hungary	K-1 Hungary MAX 2008 Group A	Dunaújváros Hungary	Viktor Pethes	Hungary
2008-06-07	Csaba Győrfi	Hungary	K-1 Hungary MAX 2008 Group B	Dunaújváros, Hungary	Krisztián Jászka	Hungary
2008-05-31	Marcus Öberg	Sweden	K-1 Scandinavia MAX 2008	Stockholm, Sweden	Dzhabar Askerov	Russia
2008-05-10	Mohamed Mojaid	Morocco	K-1 Europe MAX 2008 in Italy	Modena, Italy	Thanit Im On	Thailand
2008-04-12	Murthel Groenhart	Netherlands	K-1 Italy Oktagon 2008	Milan, Italy	Hallim Issaoui	Morocco
2008-04-12	Waldemar Wiebe	Germany	K-1 Warriors 2008	Lübeck, Germany	Hasmie Kasrioui	Netherlands
2008-04-06	Petr Nakonechnyi	Ukraine	K-1 Europe MAX 2008 in Poland	Warsaw, Poland	Michał Głogowski	Poland
2008-02-24	Chi Bin Lim	(South Korea) Korea	K-1 Asia MAX 2008 in Seoul Asia Tournament	Seoul, Korea	K. MAX	(South Korea) Korea
2008-02-17	Warren Stevelmans	South Africa	K-1 MAX Netherlands 2008 The Final Qualification	Utrecht, Netherlands	Marco Pique	Suriname
2008-02-02	Yasuhiro Kido	Japan	K-1 World MAX 2008 Japan Tournament	Tokyo, Japan	Hayato	Japan
2007
2007-11-10	Toni Friedrich	Germany	K-1 Championships 2007 German Finals	Lübeck, Germany	Darek Obloj	Germany
2007-05-20	Sofiane Allouche	Algeria	K-1 UK MAX Tournament 2007 Pain & Glory	London, England	Jordan Watson	United Kingdom
2007-03-17	Denis Schneidmiller	Germany	K-1 East Europe MAX 2007	Vilnius, Lithuania	Andrey Vakarash	Moldova
2007-02-18	Su Hwan Lee	South Korea	K-1 Fighting Network KHAN 2007 in Seoul	Seoul, South Korea	Chi Bin Lim	South Korea
2007-02-05	Yoshihiro Sato	Japan	K-1 World MAX 2007 Japan Tournament	Tokyo, Japan	Tatsuji	Japan
2006
2006-11-24	Nieky Holzken	Netherlands	K-1 World MAX North European Qualification 2007	Stockholm, Sweden	Elias Daniel	Sweden
2006-11-24	Petr Nakonechnyi	Ukraine	K-1 MAX Ukraine 2006	Dnipropetrovsk, Ukraine	Artem Sheglov	Ukraine
2006-11-19	Sem Braan	Netherlands	K-1 MAX Canarias 2006	Santa Cruz de Tenerife, Spain	Eric Kouman	Cameroon
2006-03-31	Luis Reis	Portugal	K-1 MAX Portugal 2006	Loures, Portugal	Ricardo Fernandes	Portugal
2006-03-26	Rayen Simson	Suriname	K-1 MAX Netherlands 2006 The Road to Tokyo	Utrecht, Netherlands	Faldir Chahbari	Morocco
2006-03-17	Sergei Makagonov	Russia	K-1 Russia MAX 2006	Kaliningrad, Russia	Dzhabar Askerov	Russia
2006-03-10	Artur Kyshenko	Ukraine	K-1 East Europe MAX 2006	Vilnius, Lithuania	Marius Buzinskas	Lithuania
2006-02-25	Chi Bin Lim	South Korea	K-1 Fighting Network KHAN 2006 in Busan	Busan, South Korea	Su Hwan Lee	South Korea
2006-02-04	Yoshihiro Sato	Japan	K-1 World MAX 2006 Japan Tournament	Saitama, Japan	Tatsuji	Japan
2005
2005-02-23	Takayuki Kohiruimaki	Japan	K-1 World MAX 2005 Japan Tournament	Tokyo, Japan	Akeomi Nitta	Japan
2004
2004-12-18	Abraham Roqueñi	Spain	K-1 MAX Spain 2004	Guadalajara, Spain	Luis Reis	Portugal
2004-11-05	Shane Chapman	New Zealand	K-1 Oceania MAX 2004	Auckland, New Zealand	Hamid Bouajoub	Morocco
2004-04-02	José Reis	Portugal	K-1 MAX Portugal 2004	Lisbon, Portugal	Tarik Farina	France
2004-03-21	Ally Smith	United Kingdom	K-1 MAX Scotland 2004	Renfrew, Scotland	James Jarvie	United Kingdom
2004-02-24	Takayuki Kohiruimaki	Japan	K-1 World MAX 2004 Japan Tournament	Tokyo, Japan	Serkan Yilmaz	Turkey
2003
2003-11-09	Mark Beale	United Kingdom	K-1 UK MAX 2003	Birmingham, England	Neil Woods	United Kingdom
2003-11-07	Jordan Tai	New Zealand	K-1 New Zealand MAX 2003	Auckland, New Zealand	Shane Chapman	New Zealand
2003-03-01	Masato	Japan	K-1 World MAX 2003 Japan Grand Prix	Tokyo, Japan	Kozo Takeda	Japan
2002
2002-12-14	José Reis	Portugal	K-1 Spain MAX 2002	Barcelona, Spain	Ante Bilic	Croatia
2002-11-26	Mike Zambidis	Greece	K-1 Oceania MAX 2002	Melbourne, Australia	John Wayne Parr	Australia
2002-11-26	Konstantin Petz	United Kingdom	K-1 UK MAX 2002	Birmingham, England	Kevin Harper	United Kingdom
2002-11-08	Jordan Tai	New Zealand	K-1 New Zealand 2002	Auckland, New Zealand	Aaron Boyes	New Zealand
2002-10-01	Marfio Canoletti	Brazil	K-1 World MAX 2002 Preliminary Brazil	São Paulo, Brazil	Zelly Ferreira	Brazil
2002-03-15	Duane Ludwig	United States	K-1 World MAX 2002 USA	Denver, Colorado	Ole Laursen	Denmark
2002-03-01	Masato	Japan	K-1 Japan MAX 2002	Tokyo, Japan	Takayuki Kohiruimaki	Japan
2001
2001-11-11	Shane Chapman	New Zealand	K-1 Oceania MAX 2001	Melbourne, Australia	Mike Cope	Australia

Legend: K-1 World MAX Qualifier

== K-1 World Grand Prix -90kg Champions ==
=== -90kg: Cruiserweight ===
- K-1 (2026–present)

K-1 WORLD GRAND PRIX -90kg Champions
Date	Champion	Nationality	Event	Location	Runner-up	Nationality
2027-05-09			K-1 World GP 2027 -90kg World Championship Tournament	Tokyo, Japan		
2026-02-08	Lukas Achterberg	Germany	K-1 World GP 2026 -90kg World Championship Tournament	Tokyo, Japan	Nikita Kozlov	Russia

=== K-1 World Grand Prix -90kg: Finalists ===
- K-1 (2026–present)

K-1 WORLD GRAND PRIX -90kg FINAL
Fighter	Best result	Previous appearances in GP FINAL	Record (W-L-D-NC)
(Germany) Lukas Achterberg	Champions 2026	2026	19-1
(Russia) Nikita Kozlov	Runner-up 2026	2026	22-4
(Romania) Bogdan Stoica	3rd place 2026	2026	61-19
(Morocco) Ibrahim El Bouni	3rd place 2026	2026	44-14-1-0
(Iran) Mahmoud Sattari	Quarter Finals 2026	2026	23-5
(Italy) Mattia Faraoni	Quarter Finals 2026	2026	32-6
(Brazil) Marco Antonio	Quarter Finals 2026	2026	35-10
(Kazakhstan) Aslan Koshiyev	Quarter Finals 2026	2026	7-3

== K-1 GP -90kg Preliminary Tournament Champions ==
K-1 WORLD GP -90kg Preliminary Tournament Champions
Date	Champion	Nationality	Event	Location	Runner-up	Nationality
2026
2026-12-			K-1 World GP -90kg Qualification in Abu Dhabi	Abu Dhabi, UAE		
2026-11-			K-1 World GP -90kg Qualification in Kochi	Kochi, India		
2026-12-05			K-1 World GP -90kg Qualification in Paris	Paris, France		
2026-11-07	Aaron Măcăilă	Romania	K-1 World GP -90kg Qualification in Milan	Milan, Italy	Loic Njeya	Cameroon
2026-10-31	Charlie Bubb	Australia	K-1 World GP -90kg Qualification in Melbourne	Melbourne, Australia	Leki Goetz	New Zealand
2026-10-24	Robert Stoll	Germany	K-1 World GP -90kg Qualification in Dortmund	Dortmund, Germany	Yassir Taoussi	Morocco
2026-10-09	Vasile Corcodel	Romania	K-1 World GP -90kg Preliminary in Iași	Iași, Romania	Becali Bodescu	Romania
2026-09-26	João Victor	Brazil	K-1 World GP -90kg Qualification in Brasília	Brasília, Brazil	Agnaldo Arruda	Brazil
2026-08-01	Nikita Kokosh	Belarus	K-1 World GP -90kg Preliminary in Yekaterinburg	Yekaterinburg, Russia	Yan Petrovich	Russia
2025
2025-10-04	Marco Antonio	Brazil	K-1 World GP 2025 -90kg in Brasília	Brasília, Brazil	Modestino Rodrigues	Brazil

Legend: K-1 World Grand Prix -90kg Qualifier

== K-1 World Tournament Champions ==
- K-1 World GP Japan (2014–present)

K-1 World Tournament Champions
Date	Weight	Champion	Nationality	Event	Location	Runner-up	Nationality
K-1 World GP Japan
2025-05-31	60 kg	Rémi Parra	France	K-1 Beyond	Yokohama, Japan	Tomoya Yokoyama	Japan
2025-02-09	Women's 45 kg	Kira Matsutani	Japan	K-1 World MAX 2025	Tokyo, Japan	Aki Suematsu	Japan
2024-09-29	65 kg	Yodkhunpon Weerasakreck	Thailand	K-1 World MAX 2024	Tokyo, Japan	Shu Inagaki	Japan
2024-09-29	55 kg	Akihiro Kaneko	Japan	K-1 World MAX 2024	Tokyo, Japan	Rui Okubo	Japan
2023-06-03	75 kg	Hasan Toy	Turkey	K-1 World GP 2023: inaugural Middleweight Championship Tournament	Yokohama, Japan	Shintaro Matsukura	Japan
2022-12-03	53 kg	Toma Kuroda	Japan	K-1 World GP 2022 in Osaka	Osaka, Japan	Issei Ishii	Japan
2022-09-11	60 kg	Leona Pettas	Japan	K-1 World GP 2022: Yokohamatsuri	Yokohama, Japan	Hirotaka Asahisa	Japan
2022-08-11	57.5 kg	Taito Gunji	Japan	K-1 World GP 2022 in Fukuoka	Fukuoka, Japan	Toma	Japan
2022-06-25	Women's 45 kg	Phayahong Ayothayafightgym	Thailand	K-1: Ring of Venus	Tokyo, Japan	Miyuu Sugawara	Japan
2022-02-27	55 kg	Akihiro Kaneko	Japan	K-1 World GP 2022 Japan	Tokyo, Japan	Masashi Kumura	Japan
2021-09-20	67.5 kg	Masaaki Noiri	Japan	K-1 World GP 2021: Yokohamatsuri	Yokohama, Japan	Rukiya Anpo	Japan
2020-03-22	70 kg	Minoru Kimura	Brazil	K-1: K’Festa 3	Saitama, Japan	Hiromi Wajima	Japan
2019-12-28	Women's 52 kg	Kana Morimoto	Japan	K-1 World GP 2019 Japan: ～Women's Flyweight Championship Tournament～	Nagoya, Japan	Josefine Lindgren Knutsson	Sweden
2019-11-24	57.5 kg	Yuki Egawa	Japan	K-1 World GP 2019 Yokohamatsuri	Yokohama, Japan	Jawsuayai Sor.Dechaphan	Thailand
2019-06-30	55 kg	Yoshiki Takei	Japan	K-1 World GP 2019: Super Bantamweight World Tournament	Tokyo, Japan	Masashi Kumura	Japan
2018-12-08	62.5 kg	Kenta Hayashi	Japan	K-1 World GP 2018: K-1 Lightweight World's Strongest Tournament	Osaka, Japan	Fumiya Osawa	Japan
2018-11-03	65 kg	Kaew Fairtex	Thailand	K-1 World GP 2018: 3rd Super Lightweight Championship Tournament	Tokyo, Japan	Daizo Sasaki	Japan
2018-09-24	90 kg	Sina Karimian	Iran	K-1 World GP 2018: inaugural Cruiserweight Championship Tournament	Tokyo, Japan	Boubaker El Bakouri	Morocco
2018-06-17	57.5 kg	Yuta Murakoshi	Japan	K-1 World GP 2018 Featherweight Tournament	Tokyo, Japan	Haruma Saikyo	Japan
2018-03-21	60 kg	Takeru	Japan	K'Festa 1	Tokyo, Japan	Kosuke Komiyama	Japan
2017-11-23	Heavyweight (Open)	Antonio Plazibat	Croatia	K-1 World GP 2017 Heavyweight Tournament	Tokyo, Japan	Ibrahim El Bouni	Morocco
2017-09-18	67.5 kg	Yuta Kubo	Japan	K-1 World GP 2017 Welterweight Tournament	Tokyo, Japan	Mohan Dragon	Nepal
2017-06-18	70 kg	Chingiz Allazov	Belarus	K-1 World GP 2017 Super Welterweight Championship Tournament	Tokyo, Japan	Yasuhiro Kido	Japan
2017-02-25	62.5 kg	Wei Rui	China	K-1 World GP 2017 Lightweight Championship Tournament	Tokyo, Japan	Ren Hiramoto	Japan
2016-11-03	57.5 kg	Takeru	Japan	K-1 World GP 2016 Featherweight World Tournament	Tokyo, Japan	Kaito Ozawa	Japan
2016-09-19	60 kg	Koya Urabe	Japan	K-1 World GP 2016 Super Featherweight World Tournament	Tokyo, Japan	Taiga	Japan
2016-06-24	65 kg	Kaew Fairtex	Thailand	K-1 World GP 2016 -65kg World Tournament	Tokyo, Japan	Ilias Bulaid	Morocco
2015-07-04	70 kg	Marat Grigorian	Armenia	K-1 World GP 2015 -70kg Championship Tournament	Tokyo, Japan	Jordann Pikeur	Netherlands
2015-04-19	55 kg	Takeru	Japan	K-1 World GP 2015 -55kg Championship Tournament	Tokyo, Japan	Taiga	Japan
2015-01-18	60 kg	Koya Urabe	Japan	K-1 World GP 2015 -60kg Championship Tournament	Tokyo, Japan	Hirotaka Urabe	Japan
2014-11-03	65 kg	Kaew Fairtex	Thailand	K-1 World GP 2014 -65kg Championship Tournament	Tokyo, Japan	Yasuomi Soda	Japan

== Other K-1 Tournament Champions ==
=== K-1 ===
-65kg: Super Lightweight

Date	Champion	Nationality	Event	Location	Runner-up	Nationality
2016-03-04	Hideaki Yamazaki	Japan	K-1 World GP 2016 -65kg Japan Tournament	Tokyo, Japan	Masaaki Noiri	Japan

-60kg: Super Featherweight

Date	Champion	Nationality	Event	Location	Runner-up	Nationality
2016-04-24	Taiga	Japan	K-1 World GP 2016 -60kg Japan Tournament	Tokyo, Japan	Koya Urabe	Japan

-53kg: Bantamweight

Date	Champion	Nationality	Event	Location	Runner-up	Nationality
2021-05-30	Toma Kuroda	Japan	K-1 World GP 2021: Japan Bantamweight Tournament	Yokohama, Japan	Kazuki Miburo	Japan

=== K-1 FEG ===
-100kg: K-1 Heavyweight

Date	Champion	Nationality	Event	Location	Runner-up	Nationality
2009-03-28	Kyotaro	Japan	K-1 World GP 2009 in Yokohama	Yokohama, Japan	Gökhan Saki	Turkey

-63kg: K-1 Lightweight

Date	Champion	Nationality	Event	Location	Runner-up	Nationality
2011-06-25	Yuta Kubo	Japan	K-1 World MAX 2011 –63 kg Japan Tournament Final	Tokyo, Japan	Koya Urabe	Japan
2010-07-05	Tetsuya Yamato	Japan	K-1 World MAX 2010 –63 kg Japan Tournament Final	Tokyo, Japan	Yuta Kubo	Japan

-60kg: K-1 Featherweight

Date	Champion	Nationality	Event	Location	Runner-up	Nationality
1997-11-09	Takehiro Murahama	Japan	K-1 Grand Prix '97 Final, K-1 Japan Featherweight GP '97	Tokyo, Japan	Kenichi Sato	Japan

=== K-1 Global ===
Openweight

K-1 Global / K-1 Rising World GP Champions
Date	Champion	Nationality	Event	Location	Runner-up	Nationality
2013-03-15	Mirko Filipović	Croatia	K-1 Rising ~ K-1 World Grand Prix Final in Zagreb	Zagreb, Croatia	Ismael Londt	Suriname

-95 kg

K-1 Global / K-1 World GP EURO Champions
Date	Champion	Nationality	Event	Location	Runner-up	Nationality
2016-10-27	Roman Kryklia	Ukraine	K-1 World GP 2016 Euro -95kg Tournament	Belgrade, Serbia	Fabio Kwasi	Netherlands

-85 kg: Light Heavyweight

K-1 Global / K-1 World GP Light Heavyweight Champions
Date	Champion	Nationality	Event	Location	Runner-up	Nationality
2013-03-30	Constantin Țuțu	Moldova	K-1 World GP 2013 in Moldova - Light Heavyweight Tournament	Chișinău, Moldova	Leon Miedema	Netherlands

K-1 Global / K-1 World GP EURO Champions
Date	Champion	Nationality	Event	Location	Runner-up	Nationality
2016-12-03	Timur Aylyarov	Russia	K-1 World GP 2016 Euro -85kg Tournament	Tuzla, Bosnia and Herzegovina	Igor Emkić	Bosnia and Herzegovina

-70 kg

K-1 Global / K-1 Rising World MAX Champions
Date	Champion	Nationality	Event	Location	Runner-up	Nationality
2014-10-12	Enriko Kehl	Germany	K-1 Rising ~ K-1 World MAX 2014 Final	Pattaya, Thailand	Buakaw Banchamek	Thailand
2012-12-15	Murthel Groenhart	Netherlands	K-1 Rising ~ K-1 World MAX 2012 Final	Athens, Greece	Artur Kyshenko	Ukraine

=== K-2 / K-3: Grand Prix Champions ===
K-2

Weight limit: 82 kg

K-2 World Grand Prix Champions
Date	Champion	Nationality	Event	Location	Runner-up	Nationality
1995-01-07	Rob Kaman	Netherlands	K-2 France Grand Prix '95	Paris, France	Jérôme Turcan	France
1994-05-08	Ernesto Hoost	Netherlands	K-2 Plus Tournament 1994	Amsterdam, Netherlands	Bob Schreiber	Netherlands
1993-12-19	Ernesto Hoost	Netherlands	K-2 Grand Prix '93	Tokyo, Japan	Changpuek Kiatsongrit	Thailand

K-3

Weight limit: 75 kg

K-3 World Grand Prix Champions
Date	Champion	Nationality	Event	Location	Runner-up	Nationality
1995-07-16	Ivan Hippolyte	Netherlands	K-3 Grand Prix '95	Nagoya, Japan	Taiei Kin	Japan

== See also ==
- List of K-1 events
- List of HERO's events
- List of male kickboxers
