= Sina Karimian =

Iranian kickboxer

- Born: 23 January 1988 (age 38); Isfahan, Iran
- Native name: سینا کریمیان
- Other names: Hero
- Height: 194 cm (6 ft 4 1/2 in)
- Weight: 104.4 kg (230 lb; 16.44 st)
- Division: Heavyweight
- Style: Kickboxing
- Stance: Orthodox
- Team: WSR Tokyo (2018–2019); POWER OF DREAM (2019–present)
- Trainer: Weerasakreck Wonpasser; Seiichi Furukawa

Kickboxing record
- Total: 21
- Wins: 15
- By knockout: 7
- Losses: 5
- By knockout: 3
- No contests: 1

Other information
- Website: www.sina-karimian.com

Sina Karimian (born 23 January 1988) is an Iranian kickboxer. He competes in GLORY. He is the former K-1 Cruiserweight Champion.

== Kickboxing career ==
Karimian participated in the 2018 K-1 WORLD GP Cruiserweight (−90 kg) Tournament. He beat OD.KEN in the quarter-finals with a fourth-round TKO. In the semi-finals he defeated K-Jee with a unanimous decision. He won a majority decision against Boubaker El Bakouri with a majority decision to become the inaugural K-1 Cruiserweight champion.

He made his first title defence against Hisaki Kato during K-1 World GP 2019: K'FESTA 2. Karimian won a unanimous decision.

He made his second title defence in a rematch against Ryo Aitaka. Karimian won a unanimous decision.

Karimian fought K-Jee on 3 November 2020 during K-1 WGP Japan. He lost the fight by a first-round knockout.

Sina was scheduled to fight Seiya Tanigawa at K'Festa 4, but the event was later postponed due to the COVID-19 pandemic. He was instead scheduled to fight K-Jee at K'Festa 4 Day 2 for the K-1 WORLD GP Cruiserweight title. Sina won the fight by a second-round knockout, after being knocked down twice in the first round.

Karimian was scheduled to face the former K-1 heavyweight champion Kyotaro Fujimoto at K-1 World GP 2021: Yokohamatsuri on 20 September 2021. He won the fight by split decision, after an extra round was fought.

Karimian faced Rikiya Yamashita at THE MATCH 2022 on 19 June 2022. He won the fight by unanimous decision.

Karimian faced Kosuke Jitsukata at K-1 World GP 2022 Yokohamatsuri on 11 September 2022. He won the fight by a first-round knockout.

Karimian took part in the Glory 99 "Heavyweight Last Man Standing Tournament" where 32 heavyweight fighters competed on 5 April 2025 in Rotterdam, Netherlands. He faced off against Tomáš Možný in the opening round, losing via unanimous decision.

== Mixed Martial Arts career ==
Karimian made his Mixed Martial Arts debut at RIZIN Landmark 11 in Sapporo in June 2025, facing off against GRACHAN Heavyweight Champion, Hidetaka Arato. He won the fight via unanimous decision.

Sina returned to MMA at K-1 World MAX 2025 - 70kg World Tournament Opening Round, facing Blake Troop in a Heavyweight bout. This marked the return of K-1's MMA brand, HEROs. This was the first time it has been utilized since December 2007. The bout ended in a No Contest, after an accidental eye poke rendered Troop unable to continue.

== Boxing career ==
Karimian would face former K-1 Super Lightweight kickboxing champion Ruyika Anpo in a 6-round scored exhibition boxing match at RIZIN 49. Karimian weighed in at 216 pounds, while Anpo weighed in at 178 pounds. Despite the 38 pound weight advantage, Karimian was thoroughly outboxed by Anpo. Karimian would accidentally hit the referee multiple times during a scuffle with Anpo, but the bout continued after a brief pause. Karimian would lose the bout via unanimous decision, failing to win a single round.

Karimian would face former HEAT and ISKA Lightweight Kickboxing champion Kouzi in a 3-round exhibition boxing match at RIZIN: Otoko Matsuri. The bout was booked as a "punishment fight" after Kouzi was involved in a hit-and-run the previous December. He took the fight with Karimian as penance for his actions. After 3 rounds, the fight was declared a draw, due to it being an exhibition.

== Titles and accomplishments ==
=== Professional ===
- K-1
  - 2018 K-1 World GP −90 kg Championship Tournament Winner
  - 2021 K-1 World GP −90 kg Championship
    - Two successful defenses
- World Kickboxing Network
  - 2017 WKN Oriental rules Super Cruiserweight (92.5 kg) International Champion

=== Amateur ===
- WKU Amateur World Heavyweight Champion
- IKN Amateur World Heavyweight Champion
- WKF Amateur World Heavyweight Champion
- 2017 IFMA Amateur Muaythai World Championship (91 kg) 3rd place.

== Kickboxing record ==
Professional Kickboxing Record(incomplete)
16 Wins (8 (T)KO's), 5 Losses, 0 Draw, 2 No Contest
Date	Result	Opponent	Event	Location	Method	Round	Time
2026-12-12		(Azerbaijan) Bahram Rajabzadeh	Glory Collision 10	Arnhem, Netherlands			
2025-04-05	Loss	(Slovakia) Tomáš Možný	Glory 99 - Last Heavyweight Standing, Opening Round	Rotterdam, Netherlands	Decision (Unanimous)	3	3:00
2024-12-14	NC	(Japan) Daichi Kimura	K-1 World Grand Prix 2024 Final	Tokyo, Japan	Doctor stop. (Low blow)	1	
2024-10-05	NC	(Italy) Claudio Istrate	K-1 World GP 2024 in Osaka	Osaka, Japan	Doctor stop. (hit to back of the head)	1	
K-1 World Grand Prix 2024 Final Qualifier. Karimian unable to continue after a hit to the back of the head. Istrate was ahead on points at the time of the stoppage and qualified.
2024-03-20	Loss	(China) Liu Ce	K-1 World MAX 2024 - World Tournament Opening Round	Tokyo, Japan	KO (Right hook)	3	2:03
Loses the K-1 Cruiserweight (-90kg) title.
2023-09-10	Loss	(Italy) Claudio Istrate	K-1 World GP 2023: ReBOOT〜K-1 ReBIRTH〜 World Grand Prix Semifinals	Yokohama, Japan	Decision (Unanimous)	3	3:00
2023-09-10	Win	(Germany) Kerim Jemai	K-1 World GP 2023: ReBOOT〜K-1 ReBIRTH〜 World Grand Prix Quarterfinals	Yokohama, Japan	TKO (2 Knockdowns/Punches)	3	1:35
2022-12-03	Win	(Brazil) Carlos Budiao	K-1 World GP 2022 in Osaka	Osaka, Japan	DQ (Hit to the back of the head)	2	
2022-09-11	Win	(Japan) Kosuke Jitsukata	K-1 World GP 2022 Yokohamatsuri	Yokohama, Japan	KO (Punches)	1	1:21
2022-06-19	Win	(Japan) Rikiya Yamashita	THE MATCH 2022	Tokyo, Japan	Decision (Unanimous)	3	3:00
2021-09-20	Win	(Japan) Kyotaro	K-1 World GP 2021: Yokohamatsuri	Yokohama, Japan	Ext. R. Decision (Split)	4	3:00
2021-03-28	Win	(Japan) K-Jee	K'Festa 4 Day 2	Tokyo, Japan	KO (Spinning back fist)	2	0:26
Wins the K-1 Cruiserweight (-90kg) title.
2020-11-03	Loss	(Japan) K-Jee	K-1 World GP 2020 in Fukuoka	Fukuoka, Japan	TKO (corner stoppage)	1	
Loses the K-1 Cruiserweight (-90kg) title.
2020-03-22	Win	(Japan) Ryo Aitaka	K-1: K'Festa 3	Saitama, Japan	Decision (Unanimous)	3	3:00
Defends the K-1 Cruiserweight (-90kg) title}.
2019-08-24	Loss	(Japan) Ryo Aitaka	K-1 World GP 2019: Japan vs World 5 vs 5 & Special Superfight in Osaka	Osaka, Japan	KO (Right overhand)	3	2:08
2019-03-10	Win	(Japan) Hisaki Kato	K-1 World GP 2019: K'FESTA 2	Saitama, Japan	Decision (Unanimous)	3	3:00
Defends the K-1 Cruiserweight (-90kg) title.
2018-09-24	Win	(Morocco) Boubaker El Bakouri	K-1 World GP 2018: inaugural Cruiserweight Championship Tournament, Final	Tokyo, Japan	Decision (Majority)	3	3:00
Wins the inaugural K-1 Cruiserweight (-90kg) title.
2018-09-24	Win	(Japan) K-Jee	K-1 World GP 2018: inaugural Cruiserweight Championship Tournament, Semi-finals	Tokyo, Japan	Decision (Unanimous)	3	3:00
2018-09-24	Win	(Japan) OD.KEN	K-1 World GP 2018: inaugural Cruiserweight Championship Tournament, Quarter-finals	Tokyo, Japan	TKO (ref. stop)	4	3:00
2017-03-10	Win	(Germany) Neil Aquino	WKN Iran: World Cup 2017	Teheran, Iran	KO	2	
Wins the vacant WKN Oriental rules Super Cruiserweight International Title.
Legend: Win Loss Draw/No contest Notes

Amateur Muay Thai Record
Date	Result	Opponent	Event	Location	Method	Round	Time
2017-05-10	Loss	(Czech Republic) Jakub Klauda	2017 IFMA World Championships, Semi-final	Minsk, Belarus	RSO	2	
Wins 2017 IFMA World Championships -91kg Bronze Medal.
Legend: Win Loss Draw/No contest Notes

== Mixed martial arts record ==
Professional record breakdown
2 matches	1 win	0 losses
By decision	1	0
No contests	1	

Res.	Record	Opponent	Method	Event	Date	Round	Time	Location	Notes
NC	1–0 (1)	Blake Troop	NC (accidental eye poke)	K-1 World MAX 2025: 70kg World Tournament Opening Round	7 September 2025	2	1:53	Tokyo, Japan	Accidental eye poke rendered Troop unable to continue.
Win	1–0	Hidetaka Arato	Decision (unanimous)	Rizin Landmark 11	14 June 2025	3	5:00	Sapporo, Japan	Heavyweight debut.

== Exhibition boxing record ==
2 fights	0 wins	1 loss
By decision	0	1
Draws	1	

No.	Result	Record	Opponent	Type	Round, time	Date	Location	Notes
2	—N/a	0–1 (1)	Kouzi	—N/a	3	4 May 2025	Tokyo Dome, Tokyo, Japan	Non-scored bout. Rizin Special standing bout rules
1	Loss	0–1	Rukiya Anpo	UD	6	31 December 2024	Saitama Super Arena, Saitama, Japan	Rizin Special standing bout rules.

== See also ==
- List of male kickboxers
