= K-Jee (kickboxer) =

Japanese male kickboxer

- Born: Nakajima Keisuke; 5 November 1990 (age 35); Kumamoto, Japan
- Other names: Keiji, ケイジ
- Height: 1.85 m (6 ft 1 in)
- Weight: 95 kg (209 lb; 14 st 13 lb)
- Division: Cruiserweight
- Style: Kickboxing
- Fighting out of: Fukuoka, Japan
- Team: K-1 Gym Fukuoka Team Beginning

Kickboxing record
- Total: 41
- Wins: 22
- By knockout: 19
- Losses: 19
- By knockout: 12

K-Jee (born 5 November 1990) is a Japanese male kickboxer and the former K-1 Cruiserweight Champion and the former Krush Cruiserweight champion.

== Kickboxing career ==
K-Jee took part in the 2017 K-1 Heavyweight Grand Prix, losing via TKO in the first round to the eventual winner Antonio Plazibat in the quarterfinals.

He would bounce back with a TKO win in the over Shinya Uemura, at Krush 89.

K-Jee participated in the 2018 K-1 Cruiserweight Grand Prix, for the inaugural K-1 Cruiserweight title. He beat Brian McGrath by TKO in the quarterfinals, but lost a unanimous decision to Sina Karimian in the semifinals.

K-Jee won his next two fights, knocking Yuki Kudo out with a flying knee during Krush 97, and Hitoshi Sugimoto with a right hook during Krush 101.

He fought for his first major title during Krush 104, when he fought Rui Hanazawa for the Krush Cruiserweight title. He defeated Hanazawa by a second round TKO.

K-Jee was scheduled to fight Hisaki Kato in December 2019. Kato won the fight by a second round TKO. The two of them fought a rematch three months later, during Krush 112, which was to be K-Jee's first title defense. K-Jee won the fight by a first round knockout.

K-Jee was scheduled to fight Sina Karimian for the K-1 Cruiserweight title during the K-1 World GP event in Fukuoka. He won the fight by TKO, forcing Karimian's corner to throw in the towel midway through the first round.

K-Jee faced Karimian in a trilogy bout at K'Festa 4 Day Two, on March 28, 2021. Despite knocking Karimian down twice in the first round, K-Jee would lose the fight by a second-round knockout.

K-Jee faced Ryo Aitaka at the K-1 World GP 2021 in Fukuoka on July 17, 2021. After being badly hurt near the beginning of the second round, K-Jee staged a comeback victory, winning by way of a low kick knockout.

K-Jee was scheduled to face Seiya Tanigawa at the K-1 World GP 2021 in Osaka on December 4, 2021. He was later forced to withdraw from the fight. K-Jee participated in the 2022 K-1 openweight tournament, held at K-1: K'Festa 5 on April 3, 2022. He faced the Krush cruiserweight champion Mahmoud Sattari in the quarterfinals. He lost the fight by a first-round knockout.

K-Jee faced Seiya Tanigawa at the K-1 World GP 2022 in Fukuoka on August 11, 2022. He lost the fight by unanimous decision, after he was twice knocked down, once each in the second and third rounds.

K-Jee faced Ștefan Lătescu at the K-1 World GP 2023 on July 27, 2023. He lost the fight via KO in just under two minutes, being dropped first by an overhand right, before being dropped again by a hard left hook to the body, and was unable to make it to his feet.

K-Jee faced Mikio Ueda at the K-1 World GP 2023: ReBOOT ~ K-1 ReBIRTH ~ on September 10, 2023. He lost the fight via TKO, being knocked down 3 times in the second round.

K-Jee faced Mattia Faraoni at a "The Arena" event in Italy on March 23, 2024. He lost the fight via unanimous decision.

K-Jee faced Jérôme Le Banner at the K-1 World GP in Osaka on October 5, 2024, in a qualifying bout for the 2024 Grand Prix in December. There was some controversy over the booking, as Le Banner was 51 at the time of the bout, and was no longer legally allowed to fight in his native France. K-Jee won the fight via KO in the first round, dropping Le Banner with a left high kick. Le Banner retired following the bout.

K-Jee faced Errol Zimmerman in the Quarterfinals of the tournament, at the K-1 World Grand Prix 2024 Final on December 14, 2025. He lost via KO in the second round, being dropped with a left hook.

K-Jee faced Roel Mannaart at K-1 Dontaku on July 13, 2025. The bout was for Mannaart's K-1 Heavyweight Championship, and was Mannaart's first bout in over 5 years. K-Jee lost via KO, being dropped multiple times in the second round, before being finished via leg kicks.

== Championships and accomplishments ==
- Krush
  - 2019 Krush Cruiserweight Champion
    - One successful title defense
- K-1
  - 2020 K-1 Cruiserweight Champion
  - 2024 K-1 Knockout of the Year (vs. Jérôme Le Banner)

== Fight record ==
Professional Kickboxing Record
22 Wins (19 (T)KO's), 19 Losses, 0 Draw, 0 No Contest
Date	Result	Opponent	Event	Location	Method	Round	Time
2026-07-20	Loss	(Netherlands) Thian de Vries	K-1 Dontaku 2026	Fukuoka, Japan	KO	1	
2025-07-13	Loss	(Netherlands) Roel Mannaart	K-1 Dontaku	Fukuoka, Japan	KO (Low kicks)	2	1:32
For the K-1 Heavyweight Championship.
2024-12-14	Loss	(Netherlands) Errol Zimmerman	K-1 World Grand Prix 2024 Final, Quarterfinal	Tokyo, Japan	KO (Left hook)	2	0:58
2024-10-05	Win	(France) Jérôme Le Banner	K-1 World GP 2024 in Osaka	Osaka, Japan	KO (High kick)	1	1:26
Qualifies for K-1 World Grand Prix 2024 Final.
2024-03-23	Loss	(Italy) Mattia Faraoni	The Arena	Italy	Decision (Unanimous)	3	3:00
2023-09-10	Loss	(Japan) Mikio Ueda	K-1 World GP 2023: ReBOOT～K-1 ReBIRTH～	Yokohama, Japan	TKO (3 knockdowns)	2	1:39
2023-07-17	Loss	(Romania) Ștefan Lătescu	K-1 World GP 2023	Tokyo, Japan	KO (Left hook to the body)	1	1:53
2022-08-11	Loss	(Japan) Seiya Tanigawa	K-1 World GP 2022 in Fukuoka	Fukuoka, Japan	Decision (Unanimous)	3	3:00
2022-04-03	Loss	(Iran) Mahmoud Sattari	K-1: K'Festa 5, Tournament Quarterfinals	Tokyo, Japan	KO (Left hook)	1	1:28
2021-07-17	Win	(Japan) Ryo Aitaka	K-1 World GP 2021 in Fukuoka	Fukuoka, Japan	KO (Low kick)	2	1:04
2021-03-28	Loss	(Iran) Sina Karimian	K'Festa 4 Day 2	Yoyogi, Japan	KO (Spinning backfist)	2	0:26
Loses the K-1 Cruiserweight title.
2020-11-02	Win	(Iran) Sina Karimian	K-1 World GP 2020 in Fukuoka	Fukuoka, Japan	TKO (Corner Stoppage)	1	1:54
Wins the K-1 Cruiserweight title.
2020-03-28	Win	(Japan) Hisaki Kato	Krush 112	Tokyo, Japan	KO (Left hook to the body)	1	2:10
Defends the Krush Cruiserweight title.
2019-12-28	Loss	(Japan) Hisaki Kato	K-1 World GP 2019 Japan: ～Women's Flyweight Championship Tournament～	Tokyo, Japan	TKO (Three knockdowns)	2	1:17
2019-08-31	Win	(Japan) Rui Hanazawa	Krush 104	Tokyo, Japan	TKO (Punches)	2	1:43
Wins the Krush Cruiserweight title.
2019-05-18	Win	(Japan) Hitoshi Sugimoto	Krush 101	Tokyo, Japan	KO (Right hook)	2	1:24
2019-01-26	Win	(Japan) Yuki Kudo	Krush 97	Tokyo, Japan	KO (Flying knee)	2	1:13
2018-09-24	Loss	(Iran) Sina Karimian	K-1 World GP 2018: inaugural Cruiserweight Championship Tournament, Semi Finals	Saitama, Japan	Decision (Unanimous)	3	3:00
2018-09-24	Win	(United States) Brian McGrath	K-1 World GP 2018: inaugural Cruiserweight Championship Tournament, Quarter Finals	Saitama, Japan	TKO (Punches)	2	2:37
2018-06-30	Win	(Japan) Shinya Uemura	Krush 89	Tokyo, Japan	TKO (Leg kicks)	2	1:20
2018-02-12	Loss	(Japan) Ryo Aitaka	Bigbang 32	Tokyo, Japan	Decision (Majority)	3	3:00
For the Bigbang Heavyweight title.
2017-11-23	Loss	(Croatia) Antonio Plazibat	K-1 World GP 2017 Japan Heavyweight Championship Tournament, Quarter Finals	Saitama, Japan	KO (Left hook to the body)	1	1:40
2017-06-08	Win	(Japan) Tsutomu Takahagi	Krush 78	Tokyo, Japan	TKO (Referee Stoppage)	1	1:59
2017-04-22	Loss	(Japan) Koichi	K-1 World GP 2017: Super Bantamweight Tournament	Tokyo, Japan	KO (Right Straight)	3	0:38
2017-02-12	Win	(Japan) Ryo Aitaka	Bigbang 28	Tokyo, Japan	TKO (Ref. Stop/Low Kicks)	3	2:23
2016-12-18	Win	(Japan) Hidekazu Kimura	Krush 71	Tokyo, Japan	Decision (Unanimous)	3	3:00
2016-09-19	Win	(Japan) Yoshinari	K-1 World GP 2016 Super Featherweight World Tournament	Tokyo, Japan	TKO (Punches)	2	1:23
2016-06-24	Win	(Japan) Hitoshi Sugimoto	K-1 WORLD GP 2016 IN JAPAN ～World 65 kg Tournament～	Tokyo, Japan	Decision (Unanimous)	3	3:00
2016-02-30	Loss	(Japan) Zaurus Asami	Krush 64	Tokyo, Japan	TKO (Nose injury)	2	0:04
2015-09-22	Loss	(Japan) Kazuya Akimoto	K-1 World GP 2015 Survival Wars	Tokyo, Japan	Decision (Unanimous)	3	3:00
2015-04-19	Loss	(Japan) Kotetsu	K-1 World GP 2015 -55kg Championship Tournament	Tokyo, Japan	KO (Right hook)	1	2:15
2014-07-13	Loss	(Japan) Yutaro Yamauchi	Krush 43	Tokyo, Japan	Decision (Unanimous)	3	3:00
2012-10-21	Win	(Japan) Meriken Yuto	KAKUMEI PURITY	Osaka, Japan	KO (Right cross)	3	1:49
Legend: Win Loss Draw/No contest Notes

== See also ==
- List of male kickboxers
- List of K-1 champions
