= Ryo Aitaka =

Former Japanese kickboxer

- 愛鷹亮
- Born: 31 December 1989 (age 36); Numazu, Shizuoka, Japan
- Height: 180 cm (5 ft 11 in)
- Spouse: Sumire Satō (m. 2021)
- Children: 2
- Martial arts career
- Nickname: Japanese Soul Boy
- Nationality: Japanese
- Weight: 90 kg (200 lb)
- Division: Cruiserweight; Heavyweight
- Style: Kickboxing
- Fighting out of: Sagamihara, Japan
- Team: Riki Dojo Shizuoka (2014–2019, 2022–2023); K-1 Gym Sagami-ono Krest (2019–2022)
- Rank: 3rd dan black belt in Judo
- Years active: 2014–2023

Kickboxing record
- Total: 36
- Wins: 22
- By knockout: 10
- Losses: 14
- By knockout: 8
- Last updated on: 30 December 2023
- Professional wrestling career
- Ring name: Riki Aitaka
- Trained by: Kota Ibushi
- Debut: 30 December 2023

Ryo Aitaka (愛鷹 亮, Aitaka Ryō; born 31 December 1989) is a Japanese professional wrestler and former kickboxer, who competed in the cruiserweight and heavyweight divisions of K-1. He was a one-time K-1 Cruiserweight title challenger, having challenged for the title in 2020. In 2023, he took up professional wrestling, training at the Ibushi Prowrest Lab, and made his debut for Gleat on 30 December, under the ring name Riki Aitaka (愛鷹 力, Aitaka Riki), and later under his real name.

== Kickboxing career ==
=== BigBang ===
==== Early career ====
Aitaka made his promotional debut with BigBang against Lin Wuzhong at Bigbang 17 on 1 June 2014. He lost the fight by unanimous decision, with scores of 30–29, 30–28, 30–29. The first professional loss of his career would be followed by the first stoppage loss of his career, as Aitaka lost by a first-round knockout to Andrew Peck at HEAT 33 on 7 September 2014, who knocked him out with a head kick.

Aitaka returned to BigBang for his next bout, as he was booked to face Taichi Furuta at Bigbang 19 on 7 December 2014. He won the fight by unanimous decision, with scores of 30–29、30–28、30–29. Aitaka was then booked to face Nangoku Chojin at SHOOT BOXING 2015 - 30th Anniversary act.1 on 21 February 2015. He lost the fight by a third-round technical knockout.

Aitaka faced Atsushi Ogasawara at Bigbang 21 on 7 June 2015. He notched his first stoppage victory with the promotion, as he knocked Ogasawara with a right straight midway through the opening round. Aitaka faced Shinya Uemura, in his third fight of the year, at Bigbang 22 on 6 September 2015. He won the fight by a first-round knockout, needing just over two minutes to stop his opponent. Aitaka faced Devin Pipose at Bigbang 23 on 6 December 2015, in his final fight of the year. He won the fight by majority decision.

Aitaka faced Ryo Takigawa at Bigbang 24 on 21 February 2016. He won the fight by a second-round technical knockout. Aitaka was next booked to face Xue Wu at Bigbang 25 on 5 June 2016. He won the fight by a second-round technical knockout, extending his winning streak to five consecutive fights.

==== BigBang Heavyweight champion ====
His five-fight winning streak earned Aitaka a place in the 2016 BigBang Heavyweight tournament, held to crown the promotions' inaugural champion. Aitaka faced -NORI- in the semifinal bout of the four-man tournament, which took place at Bigbang 26 on 4 September 2016. He won the fight by unanimous decision. Aitaka advanced to the final, held at Bigbang 27 on 4 December 2016, where he faced Taichi Furuta. Aitaka and Furuta previously fought at Bigbang 19 on 7 December 2014, with Aitaka winning by unanimous decision. He was equally successful in their second meeting, as he once again won by unanimous decision, with scores of 30–29、30–28、30–29.

Aitaka made his first BigBang heavyweight title defense against Kousuke Jitsukata at Bigbang Isehara on 8 October 2017. He won the fight by a second-round knockout, stopping Jitsukata with a left hook in the very last second of the round. Aitaka made his K-1 debut against Taichi Furuta at K-1 Cruiserweight Championship on 22 November 2017, in the reserve bout of the 2017 K-1 Heavyweight tournament. He won the fight by a first-round technical knockout, after he had knocked Furuta down twice by the 2:17 minute mark.

Aitaka made his second BigBang heavyweight title defense against K-JEE at Bigbang 32 on 17 February 2018. The bout was a rematch of their 12 February 2017 match, which K-JEE won by a third-round technical knockout. Aitaka won the fight by majority decision, with scores of 29–29, 30–29 and 30–29. Aitaka made his third title defense against Yuki Kudo at Bigbang Isehara 2018 on 4 November 2018. He won the fight by a second-round technical knockout. Aitaka made his fourth title defense against Daiki Takase at Bigbang 34 on 26 December 2018. He won the fight by unanimous decision, with all three judges scoring the bout 30–29 in his favor.

Aitaka made his fifth and final BigBang heavyweight title defense against OD-KEN at Bigbang 36 on 6 June 2019. Prior to this bout, Aitaka departed from his old gym, Riki Dojo Shizuoka, and began training at K-1 GYM SAGAMI-ONO KREST. Aitaka needed just 37 seconds to knock OD-KEN out with a right hook.

=== K-1 ===
Aitaka faced the inaugural K-1 cruiserweight champion Sina Karimian in a non-title bout at K-1 World GP 2019 ～Japan vs World～ on 24 August 2019. He won the fight by a third-round knockout. In his post-fight interview, Aitaka called for a rematch with Karimian's title on the line. Aitaka faced Jae Geun Yang at K-1 World GP 2019 Yokohamatsuri on 24 November 2019. He was awarded a technical knockout victory after just 57 seconds, as Yang was unable to continue due to a shoulder injury.

Aitaka was booked to challenge the reigning K-1 Cruiserweight champion Sina Karimian at K-1: K'Festa 3 on 22 March 2020. Although Aitaka was able to knock Karimian down in the first round, he was himself knocked down with a spinning backfist in the second round. He was unable to recover in the third round and lost the fight by unanimous decision, with all three judges scoring the fight 28–27 for Karimian.

Aitaka faced Animal Koji at K-1 World GP 2021: K’Festa 4 Day.2 on 28 March 2021, following a year-long absence from the sport. He lost the fight by unanimous decision. Both Aitaka and Koji suffered knockdowns in the first round, but Koji was able to edge Aitaka in the next two round to win the decision. Aitaka faced K-JEE in a trilogy match at K-1 World GP 2021 in Fukuoka on 17 July 2021. He lost the fight by a second-round knockout. Aitaka faced the debuting Satoshi Ishii at K-1 World GP 2021: Yokohamatsuri on 20 September 2021. He lost the fight by unanimous decision, after an extra round was fought.

Aitaka faced Hisaki Kato at K-1: K'Festa 5 on 3 April 2022, in the reserve match of the 2022 K-1 Japan Openweight tournament. He lost the fight by a third-round knockout. Aitaka faced Hidenori Sakamoto for the vacant BigBang heavyweight championship at Super Bigbang 2022 on 13 November 2022. He lost the fight by unanimous decision, with all three judges scoring the bout 30–29 for Sakamoto.

Aitaka faced Kenta Nanbara at RISE EL DORADO 2023 on 26 March 2023. He lost the fight by a first-round knockout. Aitaka stated his intention to retire during a post-fight interview.

Aitaka announced his retirement from the sport of kickboxing on 3 December 2023.

== Professional wrestling career ==
Aitaka made his professional wrestling debut for Gleat on 30 December 2023, at Gleat Ver. 7, under the ring name Riki Aitaka. At the event, he defeated Tetsuya Izuchi in a Lidet UWF rules match.

== Personal life ==
Aitaka is married to the freelance creator and former AKB48 and SKE48 member Sumire Satō. They have two children, a daughter named Hinano and a son named Ritsu.

== Championships and accomplishments ==
- BigBang
  - BigBang Heavyweight Championship (inaugural; one time; former)
    - Five successful title defenses
- Gleat
  - One Day Tag Tournament Gotanda Cup (2025) – with T-Hawk

== Kickboxing record ==
Professional kickboxing record
22 wins (10 (T)KOs), 14 losses, 0 draws, 0 no contests
Date	Result	Opponent	Event	Location	Method	Round	Time
2023-03-26	Loss	(Japan) Kenta Nanbara	RISE ELDORADO 2023	Tokyo, Japan	KO (knee to the head)	1	2:57
2022-11-13	Loss	(Japan) Hidenori Sakamoto	Super Bigbang 2022	Tokyo, Japan	Decision (unanimous)	3	3:00
For the vacant Bigbang Heavyweight title.
2022-04-03	Loss	(Japan) Hisaki Kato	K-1: K'Festa 5, Tournament Reserve Match	Tokyo, Japan	KO (left hook)	3	1:05
2021-09-20	Loss	(Croatia) Satoshi Ishii	K-1 World GP 2021: Yokohamatsuri	Yokohama, Japan	Ext. R. decision (unanimous)	4	3:00
2021-07-17	Loss	(Japan) K-Jee	K-1 World GP 2021 in Fukuoka	Fukuoka, Japan	KO (low kick)	2	1:04
2021-03-28	Loss	(Japan) Animal Koji	K-1 World GP 2021: K’Festa 4 Day.2	Yoyogi, Japan	Decision (unanimous)	3	3:00
2020-03-22	Loss	(Iran) Sina Karimian	K-1: K'Festa 3	Saitama, Japan	Decision (unanimous)	3	3:00
For the K-1 Cruiserweight title.
2019-11-24	Win	(South Korea) Jae Geun Yang	K-1 World GP 2019 Yokohamatsuri	Osaka, Japan	KO (shoulder injury)	1	0:57
2019-08-24	Win	(Iran) Sina Karimian	K-1 World GP 2019 ～Japan vs World～	Osaka, Japan	KO (right hook)	3	0:57
2019-06-06	Win	(Japan) OD-KEN	Bigbang 36	Tokyo, Japan	KO (right hook)	1	0:37
Defends the Bigbang Heavyweight title.
2019-02-16	Loss	(Japan) Rui	Krush 98	Tokyo, Japan	KO (flying knee)	3	2:31
2018-12-26	Win	(Japan) Daiki Takase	Bigbang 34	Tokyo, Japan	Decision (unanimous)	3	3:00
Defends the Bigbang Heavyweight title.
2018-11-04	Win	(Japan) Yuki Kudo	Bigbang Isehara 2018	Isehara, Kanagawa, Japan	TKO (right hooks)	2	1:24
Defends the Bigbang Heavyweight title.
2018-08-05	Win	(Japan) Toshio	Krush 91	Tokyo, Japan	TKO (punches)	2	0:53
2018-05-17	Loss	(Japan) Hitoshi Sugimoto	Krush 88	Tokyo, Japan	KO (right head kick)	3	2:21
2018-02-17	Win	(Japan) K-Jee	Bigbang 32	Tokyo, Japan	Decision (majority)	3	3:00
Defends the Bigbang Heavyweight title.
2017-11-22	Win	(Japan) Taichi Furuta	K-1 Cruiserweight Championship, Tournament Reserve Match	Saitama, Japan	TKO (2 knockdowns/right overhand)	1	2:17
2017-10-08	Win	(Japan) Kousuke Jitsukata	Bigbang Isehara 2017	Isehara, Kanagawa, Japan	KO (left hook)	2	2:59
Defends the Bigbang Heavyweight title.
2017-08-19	Loss	(Japan) Masahiro Iwashita	Krush 79	Nagoya, Japan	Decision (unanimous)	3	3:00
2017-06-04	Win	(Japan) Hidenori Sakamoto	Bigbang 29	Tokyo, Japan	TKO (punches)	3	2:17
2017-02-12	Loss	(Japan) K-Jee	Bigbang 28	Tokyo, Japan	TKO (low kicks)	3	2:23
2016-12-04	Win	(Japan) Taichi Furuta	Bigbang 27, Tournament Final	Tokyo, Japan	Decision (unanimous)	3	3:00
Wins the Bigbang Heavyweight title.
2016-09-04	Win	(Japan) -NORI-	Bigbang 26, Tournament Semifinal	Tokyo, Japan	Decision (unanimous)	3	3:00
2016-06-05	Win	(China) Xue Wu	Bigbang 25	Tokyo, Japan	TKO (corner stoppage)	2	0:37
2016-02-21	Win	(Japan) Ryo Takigawa	Bigbang 24	Tokyo, Japan	TKO	2	2:08
2015-12-06	Win	(United States) Devin Pipose	Bigbang 23	Tokyo, Japan	Decision (majority)	3	3:00
2015-09-06	Win	(Japan) Shinya Uemura	Bigbang 22	Tokyo, Japan	KO (right straight)	2	2:01
2015-06-07	Win	(Japan) Atsushi Ogasawara	Bigbang 21	Tokyo, Japan	KO (right straight)	1	1:30
2015-02-21	Loss	(Japan) Nangoku Chojin	SHOOT BOXING 2015 - 30th Anniversary act.1	Tokyo, Japan	TKO (three knockdowns)	3	1:12
2014-12-07	Win	(Japan) Taichi Furuta	Bigbang 19	Tokyo, Japan	Decision (unanimous)	3	3:00
2014-09-07	Loss	(New Zealand) Andrew Peck	HEAT 33	Nagoya, Japan	KO (left high kick)	1	2:06
2014-06-01	Loss	(China) Lin Wuzhong	Bigbang 17	Tokyo, Japan	Decision (unanimous)	3	3:00
Legend: Win Loss Draw/no contest Notes

== See also ==
- List of male kickboxers
