= James Jarvie =

Actor, mix martial artist

- Born: 30 September 1980 (age 44); Dunfermline, Scotland
- Occupation(s): Actor and Martial Artist
- Years active: 2010–present (acting), 1999-present (martial artist)

Fighting Stats
- Height: 6 ft 1 in (1.85 m)
- Division: Welterweight
- Style: Muay Thai; MMA
- Stance: Orthodox
- Fighting out of: Scotland
- Team: Headhunters MAA (current), Fighting Fit Gym (past)
- Years active: 2001-2009

Kickboxing record
- Total: 21
- Wins: 16
- Losses: 5

Mixed martial arts record
- Total: 3
- Wins: 3
- Losses: 0

Other information
- Mixed martial arts record from Sherdog

James Jarvie (born 30 September 1980) is a Scottish actor from Dunfermline in Fife, Scotland. A trained martial artist, Jarvie's acting career began in 2010. His film debut will take place early spring 2014.

== Early life ==
James Jarvie was born in Dunfermline and was brought up in High Valleyfield, Fife. He has a twin brother, and an older sister. His father is a former soldier who served in the Scottish Black Watch regiment.

== Acting career ==
A recent student of the dramatic arts, Jarvie debuts in an apocalyptic thriller in spring 2014.

== Martial arts career ==
Jarvie has over 13 years of martial arts experience. He began his foundational training with Muay Thai at the age of 19 at the Fighting Fit Gym in Kirkcaldy. He has fought in 21 Muay Thai and K1 fights in the UK and held the Scottish Thai Boxing Association light middleweight title from 2005 for 5 years. In 2004, he was runner up in the final of K1 Scotland. Jarvie has also trained in Brazilian jiu-jitsu (BJJ), winning a white belt tournament at the Rio International Open Jiu-Jitsu Championship in 2009, as well as competing in various BJJ competitions since. He gained his purple belt under Christian Graugart, who is considered to be the original BJJ Globetrotter. Jarvie has fought and won 3 pro Mixed Martial Arts (MMA) fights, winning each fight via submission in under one minute. He was the Scottish Gladiators Professional light welterweight MMA Champion in 2008. Jarvie fought his last MMA fight in 2009. Since then he has been coaching fighters in Muay Thai, MMA and conditioning fitness in his spare time at Headhunter's Martial Arts Academy gyms in Edinburgh and Falkirk.
