= Mattia Faraoni =

Italian kickboxer

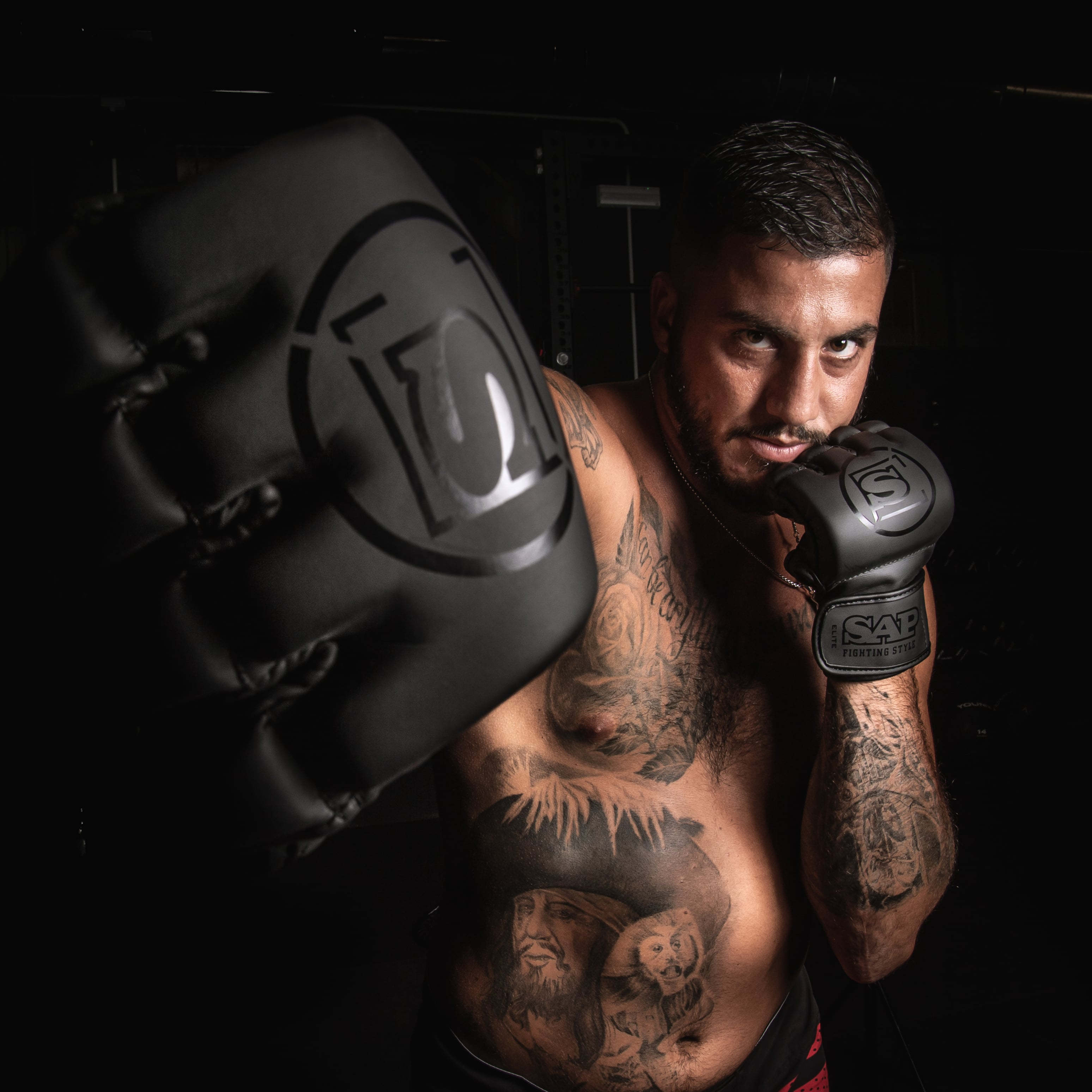
- Born: November 13, 1991 (age 34); Rome, Italy
- Height: 1.88 m (6 ft 2 in)
- Weight: 102 kg (225 lb; 16.1 st)
- Division: Cruiserweight; Heavyweight
- Style: Kickboxing, karate, boxing
- Stance: Orthodox
- Fighting out of: Rome, Italy
- Team: Fight 1 – S. Gabriel
- Rank: 2nd dan Black belt in Shinseikai Karate

Professional boxing record
- Total: 10
- Wins: 8
- By knockout: 4
- Losses: 1
- By knockout: 1
- Draws: 1

Kickboxing record
- Total: 38
- Wins: 32
- By knockout: 14
- Losses: 6
- By knockout: 1
- Draws: 0
- No contests: 0

Other information
- Boxing record from BoxRec

Mattia Faraoni (born 13 November 1991) is an Italian kickboxer. He is the reigning ISKA Oriental rules World Super Cruiserweight Champion.

== Kickboxing career ==
On August 7, 2015, Faraoni travelled to France to face Yassine Ahaggan at the West Coiast Fighting event. He lost the fight by unanimous decision.

On September 23, 2019, Faraoni faced Boubaker El Bakouri at Enfusion 80 in Rome, Italy. He won the fight by unanimous decision,

On April 2, 2022, Faraoni faced Vadim Feger at SuperFights Roma. He won the fight by second-round knockout.

On November 26, 2022, Faraoni faced Charles Joyner for the vacant ISKA oriental rules Super-cruiserweight world title. He won the fight by unanimous decision.

Faraoni made the first defense of his ISKA world title against Luis Morais at The Arena 5 event. he won the fight by unanimous decision.

Faraoni made the second defense of his ISKA world title on November 18, 2023, against Bogdan Stoica at Oktagon 2023. He won the fight by second-round technical knockout after Stoica injured his leg and had to retire.

Faraoni faced K-1 veteran K-Jee at The Arena event on March 23, 2024. He won the fight by unanimous decision.

On June 29, 2024, Faraoni successfully defended his ISKA oriental rules -95 kg world title for the third time when he defeated Dănuț Hurduc by unanimous decision at Oktagon Tsunami.

Faraoni was announced as part of the eight contestants in the K-1 World Grand Prix 2024 Final where he would face Feng Rui in the quarterfinals on December 14, 2024.

== Boxing career ==
Faraoni made his boxing professional debut on June 27, 2015, against Attila Gyen. He won the fight by knockout in the second round.

Faraoni suffered his first professional boxing defeat on March 18, 2017, when he faced Yassine Habachi, losing by technical knockout in the sixth round.

On March 26, 2021, Faraoni challenged Francesco Versaci for the Italian national cruiserweight title. The fight ended in a technical decision draw in the first round after a blow to the back of the head of Versaci left him unable to continue. An immediate rematch was scheduled for July 16, 2021, with the title again at stake. Faraoni won the fight by technical knockout at the end of the fifth round when Versaci didn't came out of his corner making Faraoni the new Italian cruiserweight champion.

== Championships and accomplishments ==
=== Professional ===
- International Sport Kickboxing Association
  - 2022 ISKA Oriental rules World Super Cruiserweight (-95 kg) Champion
    - Four successful defenses
  - 2025 ISKA Oriental rules World Super-heavyweight (+100 kg) Champion

=== Amateur ===
- World Association of Kickboxing Organizations
  - 2013 WAKO World Championship K-1 -91 kg (bronze)
  - 2014 WAKO European Championship K-1 -91 kg (bronze)

== Professional boxing record ==
10 fights	8 wins	1 loss
By knockout	4	1
By decision	4	0
Draws	1	

No.	Result	Record	Opponent	Type	Round, time	Date	Location	Notes
10	Win	8–1-1	Hamilton Ventura	PTS	6	Jul 1, 2023	Palafijlkam, Ostia, Italy	
9	Win	7–1-1	Francesco Versaci	RTD	5 (10)	Jul 16, 2021	Ladispoli, Italy	Won the Italian Boxing Federation Cruiserweight title
8	Draw	6–1-1	Francesco Versaci	TD	1 (10)	Mar 26, 2021	Palaboxe Aurelio Santoro, Rome, Italy	For the Italian Boxing Federation Cruiserweight title
7	Win	6–1	Tomislav Rudan	PTS	6	Dec 20, 2019	Cinecitta World, Rome, Italy	
6	Win	5–1	Radek Geissmann	KO	1 (6)	Jul 24, 2017	Centrale Live del Foro, Rome, Italy	
5	Loss	4–1	Yassine Habachi	TKO	5 (6)	Mar 18, 2017	PalaVespucci, Rome, Italy	
4	Win	4–0	Radovan Radojcin	TKO	2 (4)	Jul 22, 2016	Barcellona Caffè, Rome, Italy	
3	Win	3–0	Francesco Cataldo	UD	6	Mar 12, 2016	PalaVespucci, Rome, Italy	
2	Win	2–0	Elidon Gaba	PTS	4	Oct 3, 2015	Palasport, Fiumicino, Italy	
1	Win	1–0	Attila Gyen	KO	2 (4)	Jun 27, 2015	Rome, Italy	

== Kickboxing record ==
Professional kickboxing record
32 wins (14 (T)KOs), 6 losses, 0 draws, 0 no contests
Date	Result	Opponent	Event	Location	Method	Round	Time
2026-12-05		(Romania) Bogdan Stoica	Oktagon 30th Anniversary	Rome, Italy			
Defending the ISKA Kickboxing Unified rules World title.
2026-07-25	Win	(France) Jean Ralph Mambongo	Evolution Fight	Rosolini, Italy	Decision (unanimous)	3	3:00
2026-02-08	Loss	(Romania) Bogdan Stoica	K-1 World GP 2026 - 90kg World Championship Tournament, Quarterfinals	Tokyo, Japan	KO (left hook)	2	2:40
2025-11-29	Win	(Japan) Akira Umemura	K-1 World MAX Europe - Oktagon Roma	Rome, Italy	KO (spinning wheel kick)	1	2:35
Defends the ISKA Oriental rules World Super Cruiserweight (-95kg) title.
2025-06-07	Win	(Italy) Claudio Istrate	Oktagon: Valle D'Aosta	Courmayeur, Italy	Disqualification	1	
Wins the vacant ISKA Oriental rules World Super-heavyweight (+100kg) title.
2025-03-22	Win	(Romania) Dănuț Hurduc	The Arena - Warrior's Legacy	Campione d'Italia, Italy	Decision (unanimous)	3	3:00
2024-12-14	Loss	(China) Feng Rui	K-1 World Grand Prix 2024 Final, Quarterfinal	Tokyo, Japan	Decision (majority)	3	3:00
2024-06-29	Win	(Romania) Dănuț Hurduc	Oktagon Tsunami 2024	Rome, Italy	Decision (unanimous)	5	3:00
Defends the ISKA Oriental rules World Super Cruiserweight (-95kg) title.
2024-03-23	Win	(Japan) K-Jee	The Arena	Campione d'Italia, Italy	Decision (unanimous)	3	3:00
2023-11-18	Win	(Romania) Bogdan Stoica	Oktagon 2023	Turin, Italy	TKO (retirement/leg injury)	2	
Defends the ISKA Oriental rules World Super Cruiserweight (-95kg) title.
2023-11-18	Win	(Portugal) Luis Morais	The Arena 5	Rome, Italy	Decision (unanimous)	5	3:00
Defends the ISKA Oriental rules World Super Cruiserweight (-95kg) title.
2022-11-26	Win	(Australia) Charles Joyner	SuperFights Roma	Rome, Italy	Decision (unanimous)	5	3:00
Wins the vacant the ISKA Oriental rules World Super Cruiserweight (-95kg) title.
2022-04-02	Win	(Germany) Vadim Feger	SuperFights Roma	Rome, Italy	TKO	2	
2020-02-01	Win	(Germany) Rinor Latifaj	Petrosyanmania	Milan, Italy	Decision (unanimous)	3	3:00
2019-05-25	Win	(Italy) Raffaele Vitale	Oktagon 2019	Monza, Italy	Decision (unanimous)	3	3:00
2019-03-23	Win	(Morocco) Boubaker El Bakouri	Enfusion 80	Rome, Italy	Decision (unanimous)	3	3:00
2018-07-14	Loss	(Italy) Raffaele Vitale	Bellator Kickboxing 10	Rome, Italy	Decision (majority)	3	3:00
2017-11-13	Win	(Italy) Fabio Gianasi	Fight Club Roma	Rome, Italy	Decision	3	3:00
2017-01-29	Win	(Croatia) Fatmir Deskaj	Invictus Arena #22	Rome, Italy	TKO	1	
2015-08-07	Loss	(France) Yassine Ahaggan	West Coast Fighting	Lacanau, France	Decision (unanimous)	3	3:00
2015-03-21	Win	(Netherlands) Januot Adrian		Mantua, Italy	TKO (doctor stoppage)	2	
2014-10-19	Win	(Slovenia) Marko Bohorč	Invictus Arena #8	Italy	TKO (high kick)	2	
2014-03-30	Loss	(Italy) Domenico Deserio	Extreme Fight IX	Grumo Appula, Italy	Decision (unanimous)	3	3:00
2013-02-09	Win	(Italy) Lorenzo Castagna	Invictus Arena	Rome, Italy	TKO (doctor stoppage)	2	
2012-12-08	Win	(Italy) Fabrizio Sacco	Grand Prix Roma	Rome, Italy	KO (right cross)	1	
2012-05-26	Win	(Italy) Fabio Marcassoli	Fight Planet	Brescia, Italy	Decision	3	3:00
Legend: Win Loss Draw/no contest Notes

Amateur kickboxing record
Date	Result	Opponent	Event	Location	Method	Round	Time
2014-10-	Loss	(Czech Republic) Petr Kares	W.A.K.O European Championships 2014, K-1 Semi Finals	Bilbao, Spain	Decision (2:1)	3	2:00
Wins 2014 W.A.K.O. European Championship K-1 -91 kg Bronze Medal.
2014-10-	Win	(Russia) Aleksey Sidorenko	W.A.K.O European Championships 2014, K-1 Quarter Finals	Bilbao, Spain	Decision (3:0)	3	2:00
2013-10-	Loss	(Brazil) Alex Pereira	W.A.K.O World Championships 2013, K-1 Semi Finals	Guaruja, Brasil	Decision (split)	3	2:00
Wins 2013 W.A.K.O. World Championship K-1 -91 kg Bronze Medal.
2013-10-	Win	(South Africa) Karl Bergemann	W.A.K.O World Championships 2013, K-1 Quarter Finals	Guaruja, Brasil		N/A	N/A
2013-10-	Win	(Croatia) Marko Vidovic	W.A.K.O World Championships 2013, K-1 First Round	Guaruja, Brasil	Decision	3	2:00
Legend: Win Loss Draw/no contest Notes
