= Hisaki Kato =

French mixed martial arts fighter

Hisaki Kato 加藤久輝
- Born: September 17, 1982 (age 44); Paris, France
- Other names: The Japanese Musketeer
- Height: 6 ft 1 in (185 cm)
- Weight: 185 lb (84 kg; 13 st 3 lb)
- Division: Heavyweight; Middleweight
- Reach: 74 in (188 cm)
- Style: Kūdō
- Stance: Southpaw
- Fighting out of: Nagoya, Aichi, Japan
- Team: Alive MMA
- Rank: Black belt in Kudo
- Years active: 2013–present

Kickboxing record
- Total: 10
- Wins: 5
- By knockout: 3
- Losses: 5
- By knockout: 4

Mixed martial arts record
- Total: 12
- Wins: 8
- By knockout: 7
- By decision: 1
- Losses: 4
- By knockout: 3
- By decision: 1

Other information
- Mixed martial arts record from Sherdog

Hisaki Kato (Japanese: 加藤久輝, Katō Hisaki; born September 17, 1982) is a Japanese professional mixed martial artist and kickboxer who competed in Bellator's Middleweight division. A professional MMA competitor since 2013, he has also competed for Rizin.

== Background ==
Born and raised in Paris, Kato's father was a Japanese judoka who moved to Paris to pursue a career teaching the martial art, and become one of the top instructors in the country. However, he died when Kato was only a few years old. Kato's mother is French. Growing up, Kato pursued judo but favored the striking techniques of traditional Japanese martial arts such as karate. Kato was also a highly talented handball player; he began competing in junior high and moved to Japan at the age of 18 where he competed for the national team and attended college. He later returned to his martial arts roots at the age of 23, joining the Kudo Federation of Japan where he competed and won five consecutive national tournaments. After winning his fifth title, Kato was offered a contract by the Japanese MMA promotion HEAT.

== Mixed martial arts career ==
=== Early career ===
Kato made his professional debut in March 2013. In the first two years of his career, Kato competed exclusively for the Japan-based promotion, Heat. He compiled a 4–1 record, which included a first-round TKO of Yuki Niimura to win the vacant Heat Middleweight Championship.

=== Bellator MMA ===
Kato faced Joe Schilling in his promotional and United States debut at Bellator 139 on June 26, 2015. Despite being a sizable underdog, Kato won the bout in highlight-reel fashion, knocking out the seasoned kickboxer with a superman punch early in the second round.

In August 2015, Kato signed an exclusive, multi-fight contract with the promotion.

Kato faced another experienced kickboxer, Melvin Manhoef, at Bellator 146 on November 20, 2015, in the main event. Kato lost the fight via knockout due to a left hook from Manhoef in the first round.

Kato returned to Bellator in a mixed martial arts bout against A.J. Matthews on October 21, 2016, at Bellator 162. He won the fight via TKO in the first round.

Kato faced Ralek Gracie at Bellator 170 on January 21, 2017. He won the fight via unanimous decision.

Kato faced Chidi Njokuani at Bellator 189 on December 1, 2017. He lost the fight by unanimous decision. Kato was subsequently released from the promotion.

== Kickboxing ==
=== Bellator Kickboxing ===
On June 24, 2016, Kato made his professional kickboxing debut for Bellator Kickboxing. He faced Joe Schilling in a rematch at Bellator Kicking 2. Despite Schilling being the more experienced kickboxer, Kato again won the fight by knockout due to a spinning back fist in the second round.

=== K-1 ===
Kato was scheduled to face Makoto Uehara for his K-1 debut. He beat Uehara by decision, after an extra round was fought.

In his second fight with K-1, Kato was scheduled to fight RUI. Kato won the fight by a first-round KO.

Kato challenged for the K-1 Cruiserweight title, held at the time by Sina Karimian, during K-1 K'Festa 2. He lost the fight by a unanimous decision.

After his failed title shot, Kato was scheduled to fight K-Jee in December 2019. He won the fight by a second-round KO.

The two of them fought a rematch during Krush 112, for the Krush Cruiserweight title. K-Jee won the fight in the first round, by a body shot KO.

For his sixth fight with K-1, Kato was scheduled to fight Mahmoud Sattari at K-1: K’Festa 4. He lost the fight by a second-round knockout, suffering a broken nose in the process.

Kato faced Ryo Aitaka at K-1: K'Festa 5 on April 3, 2022, in the reserve bout of the 2022 K-1 openweight tournament. He won the fight by a third-round knockout. As Satoshi Ishii later withdrew from the tournament due to injury, he stepped in as the replacement to face Seiya Tanigawa in the tournament semifinals. He lost the semifinal bout by a first-round knockout.

Kato faced Akira Junior at K-1 World GP 2022 in Osaka on December 3, 2022. Despite scoring a knockdown in the first round, he lost the fight by a second-round knockout.

== Championships and accomplishments ==
=== Kickboxing ===
- HEAT
  - Heat Middleweight Championship (One time)

Awards

- Combat Press 2016 Upset of the Year (vs. Joe Schilling)

=== Mixed martial arts ===
- MMA Junkie
  - 2015 #5 Ranked Knockout of the Year vs. Joe Schilling at Bellator 139
  - June 2015 Knockout of the Month vs. Joe Schilling at Bellator 139

== Mixed martial arts record ==
Professional record breakdown
12 matches	8 wins	4 losses
By knockout	7	3
By decision	1	1

Res.	Record	Opponent	Method	Event	Date	Round	Time	Location	Notes
Loss	8–4	Tsuyoshi Sudario	TKO (doctor stoppage)	Rizin Landmark 10	November 17, 2024	3	1:11	Nagoya, Japan	Heavyweight debut.
Loss	8–3	Chidi Njokuani	Decision (unanimous)	Bellator 189	December 1, 2017	3	5:00	Thackerville, Oklahoma, United States	
Win	8–2	Ralek Gracie	Decision (unanimous)	Bellator 170	January 21, 2017	3	5:00	Inglewood, California, United States	
Win	7–2	A.J. Matthews	TKO (punches)	Bellator 162	October 21, 2016	1	4:58	Memphis, Tennessee, United States	
Win	6–2	Yuta Watanabe	TKO (punches)	Rizin 1	April 17, 2016	1	1:05	Nagoya, Japan	Catchweight (180 lb) bout.
Loss	5–2	Melvin Manhoef	KO (punch)	Bellator 146	November 20, 2015	1	3:43	Thackerville, Oklahoma, United States	
Win	5–1	Joe Schilling	KO (punch)	Bellator 139	June 26, 2015	2	0:34	Mulvane, Kansas, United States	
Loss	4–1	Henrique Shigemoto	TKO (punches)	HEAT 35	March 22, 2015	1	4:16	Nagoya, Japan	Lost the HEAT Middleweight Championship.
Win	4–0	Yuki Niimura	TKO (punches)	HEAT 31	April 19, 2014	1	0:53	Nagoya, Japan	Won the vacant HEAT Middleweight Championship.
Win	3–0	Yusuke Sakashita	TKO (head kick and punches)	HEAT 30	February 23, 2014	2	0:28	Kobe, Japan	
Win	2–0	Yuta Nakamura	TKO (punches)	HEAT 28	September 29, 2013	1	2:14	Nagoya, Japan	
Win	1–0	Tsukasa Kawaoka	TKO (punches)	HEAT 26	March 31, 2013	1	1:29	Nagoya, Japan	Middleweight debut.

== Kickboxing record ==
Professional kickboxing record
5 Wins (3 KO), 5 Losses, 0 draws
Date	Result	Opponent	Event	Location	Method	Round	Time	Record
2022-12-03	Loss	(Philippines) Akira Junior	K-1 World GP 2022 in Osaka	Osaka, Japan	TKO (Referee stoppage)	2	1:40	5-5
2022-04-03	Loss	(Japan) Seiya Tanigawa	K-1: K'Festa 5, Tournament Semifinals	Tokyo, Japan	KO (Head kick)	1	2:20	5–4
2022-04-03	Win	(Japan) Ryo Aitaka	K-1: K'Festa 5, Tournament Reserve Bout	Tokyo, Japan	KO (Left hook)	3	1:05	5–3
2021-03-21	Loss	(Iran) Mahmoud Sattari	K-1: K’Festa 4	Tokyo, Japan	KO (Knee to the head)	2	0:26	4–3
2020-03-28	Loss	(Japan) K-Jee	Krush 112	Nagoya, Japan	KO (Left Hook to the Body)	1	2:10	4–2
For the Krush Cruiserweight title.
2019-12-28	Win	(Japan) K-Jee	K-1 World GP 2019 Japan: ～Women's Flyweight Championship Tournament～	Nagoya, Japan	KO (Left Cross)	2	1:17	4–1
2019-03-10	Loss	(Iran) Sina Karimian	K-1 World GP 2019: K’FESTA 2	Saitama, Japan	Decision (Unanimous)	3	3:00	3–1
For the K-1 World GP Cruiserweight title.
2018-11-03	Win	(Japan) RUI	K-1 World GP 2018: 3rd Super Lightweight Championship Tournament	Saitama, Japan	KO (Left Overhand)	1	1:59	3–0
2018-06-17	Win	(Japan) Makoto Uehara	K-1 World GP 2018: 2nd Featherweight Championship Tournament	Saitama, Japan	Extra Round Decision (Split)	4	3:00	2–0
2016-06-24	Win	(United States) Joe Schilling	Bellator Kickboxing 2: St. Louis	St. Louis, Missouri, USA	KO (spinning back fist)	2	2:59	1–0
Legend: Win Loss Draw/No contest Notes

== See also ==
- List of current Bellator fighters
