= Boubaker El Bakouri =

Moroccan male kickboxer

- Born: 12 April 1994 (age 32); Imzouren, Morocco
- Nationality: Moroccan
- Height: 1.88 m (6 ft 2 in)
- Weight: 85 kg (187 lb; 13 st 5 lb)
- Division: Cruiserweight; Light Heavyweight
- Style: Kickboxing
- Fighting out of: Tilburg, Netherlands
- Team: Siam Gym
- Years active: 2013-present

Kickboxing record
- Total: 50
- Wins: 37
- By knockout: 22
- Losses: 12
- No contests: 1
- Last updated on: 17 September 2020

Boubaker El Bakouri (born 12 April 1994) is a Moroccan kickboxer and the finalist of the 2018 K-1 Cruiserweight Grand Prix.

== Kickboxing career ==
In 2015 Boubaker participated in the A1 World Combat Cup Platinum. In the quarter-finals, he won a unanimous decision against Bas Vorstenbosch. In the semi-finals, he lost a decision to Ibrahim El Bouni.

El Bakouri had his first fight with Enfusion during Enfusion 45, when he fought Rustam Guseinov. He won the fight by a third-round TKO.

El Bakouri participated in the 2018 K-1 Cruiserweight Grand Prix. He scored (T)KO wins over Makoto Uehara in the quarter-finals and Hitoshi Sugimoto in the semi-finals, and fought for the cruiserweight title against Sina Karimian. Boubaker lost the fight by majority decision.

Returning to Enfusion, he lost to Mattia Faraoni by unanimous decision at Enfusion 80

He would face Hicham El Gaoui at Enfusion 90, losing via TKO in the third round due to a nose injury.

Boubaker faced Steven van den Broek at Enfusion 112, winning via unanimous decision.

Boubaker would next face Valeriy Bizyaev at Ural FC 4, for the Ural FC Light Heavyweight K-1 title. He would lose via unanimous decision.

Boubaker faced Miloš Cvjetićanin at Senshi 21, losing via unanimous decision.

== Championships and accomplishments ==
- K-1
  - 2018 K-1 Cruiserweight Grand Prix runner-up
  - 2016 and 2017 Kickboxing Cruiserweight World Champion
  - 2015 European Muay Thai Champion

== Kickboxing record ==
Professional kickboxing record
37 wins (22 (T)KOs), 12 losses, 0 draws, 1 no contest
Date	Result	Opponent	Event	Location	Method	Round	Time
2024-04-20	Loss	(Serbia) Miloš Cvjetićanin	Senshi 21	Varna, Bulgaria	Decision (unanimous)	3	3:00
2023-10-20	Loss	(Russia) Valeriy Bizyaev	Ural FC 4	Perm, Russia	Decision (unanimous)	3	3:00
For the Ural FC Light Heavyweight (-90 kg) K-1 title
2022-09-24	Win	(Netherlands) Steven van den Broek	Enfusion 112	Eindhoven, Netherlands	Decision (unanimous)	3	3:00
2019-11-02	Loss	(Morocco) Hicham El Gaoui	Enfusion 90	Antwerp, Belgium	KO (nose injury)	3	
2019-03-23	Loss	(Italy) Mattia Faraoni	Enfusion 80	Rome, Italy	Decision (unanimous)	3	3:00
2018-09-24	Loss	(Iran) Sina Karimian	2018 K-1 Cruiserweight Grand Prix, Tournament Finals	Saitama, Japan	Decision (majority)	3	3:00
For the inaugural K-1 World GP Cruiserweight (−90 kg) title
2018-09-24	Win	(Japan) Hitoshi Sugimoto	2018 K-1 Cruiserweight Grand Prix, Tournament Semi-finals	Saitama, Japan	TKO (2 knockdown rule)	2	1:38
2018-09-24	Win	(Japan) Makoto Uehara	2018 K-1 Cruiserweight Grand Prix, Tournament Quarter-finals	Saitama, Japan	KO (punch)	1	1:05
2018-05-05	Win	(Belgium) Filip Verlinden	Enfusion 66	Santa Cruz de Tenerife, Spain	Decision (unanimous)	3	3:00
For the Enfusion World Light Heavyweight K-1 title
2018-04-14	Win	(Netherlands) Rick de Kruijff	FIGHT NIGHT III	Alphen aan den Rijn, Netherlands	Decision (unanimous)	3	3:00
2018-02-17	Loss	(Ukraine) Vladislav Koshel	Enfusion 61	Eindhoven, Netherlands	Decision	3	3:00
2017-10-27	Loss	(Poland) Dawid Kasperski	DSF KC: 11	Warsaw, Poland	Decision	3	3:00
2017-03-18	Loss	(Morocco) Hicham El Gaoui	Enfusion Live 47 & Kickboxing Talents 29, Tournament Finals	Nijmegen, Netherlands	Decision (unanimous)	3	3:00
2017-03-18	Win	(Belgium) Youness Benmalek	Enfusion Live 47 & Kickboxing Talents 29, Tournament Semifinals	Nijmegen, Netherlands	KO	2	
2017-02-18	Win	(Morocco) Noureddine Ajnaou	Enfusion Talents 28	Eindhoven, Netherlands	KO	1	
2016-09-12	Win	(Russia) Rustam Guseinov	Enfusion 45	Abu Dhabi, United Arab Emirates	TKO	3	2:22
2016-05-14	Win	(Netherlands) Tom Duivenvoorde	Enfusion Rookies Nijmegen	Nijmegen, Netherlands	Decision (unanimous)	3	3:00
2016-04-02	Loss	(Morocco) Hicham El Gaoui	Enfusion Gold Edition	The Hague, Netherlands	Decision (unanimous)	3	3:00
2016-02-27	Win	(Morocco) Mustapha El Barbari	Enfusion Talents 19	Eindhoven, Netherlands	TKO (punches)	3	
2015-05-16	Loss	(Netherlands) Ibrahim El Bouni	A1 World Combat Cup Platinum, Tournament Semi-finals	Eindhoven, Netherlands	Decision (unanimous)	3	3:00
2015-05-16	Win	(Netherlands) Bas Vorstenbosch	A1 World Combat Cup Platinum, Tournament Quarter-finals	Eindhoven, Netherlands	Decision (unanimous)	3	3:00
2014-11-22	Win	(Poland) Kamil Krzysztof	Fight Night 2	Bree, Belgium	Decision (unanimous)	3	3:00
2014-09-27	Win	(Turkey) Ertugrul Bayrak	A1 World Combat Cup	Eindhoven, Netherlands	TKO	3	
For the A1 World Light Heavyweight K-1 title
2014-06-21	NC	(Morocco) Kamil Jemel	Quinn Gym Fight Night 2	Venray, Netherlands	No Contest		
2014-06-07	Loss	(Morocco) Ibrahim El Boustati	Fightsense	Netherlands	Decision (unanimous)	3	3:00
2014-04-05	Win		Judgement Day Part V	Panningen, Netherlands	Decision	3	3:00
2013-11-16	Loss	(Netherlands) Tom De Smet	Glorious Heroes IV	Annen, Netherlands	KO (high kick)	1	
2013-05-21	Win	(Netherlands) Roshan Nazari	Quinn Gym Fight Night	Venray, Netherlands	TKO (punches)	3	
Legend: Win Loss Draw/no contest Notes

== See also ==
- List of male kickboxers
