= 2017 in Wu Lin Feng =

Chinese kickboxing events

Information
- First date: January 14
- Last date: N/A

Events
- Total events: N/A

Fights

Chronology
2016 in Wu Lin Feng	2017 in Wu Lin Feng	2018 in Wu Lin Feng

The year 2017 is the 14th year in the history of the Wu Lin Feng, a Chinese kickboxing promotion. Events are broadcast on Henan Television every Saturday 21:15.

== List of events ==
No.	Event	Date	Venue	City
27	Wu Lin Feng 2017: China VS Canada	December 2, 2017	Henan TV Studio 8	Zhengzhou, China
26	Wu Lin Feng 2017: WCK Muaythai vs Wu Lin Feng	November 18, 2017	The Orleans	Las Vegas, United States
25	Wu Lin Feng 2017: Yi Long VS Sitthichai	November 4, 2017	Kunming Sports Center Gymnasium	Kunming, China
24	Wu Lin Feng 2017: World Championship Hong Kong	October 14, 2017	Wanchai Southorn Stadium	Hong Kong
23	Wu Lin Feng 2017: WLF VS ACB & ACB KB 11	October 7, 2017	Henan TV Studio 8	Zhengzhou, China
22	Wu Lin Feng 2017: World Championship Xi'an	September 2, 2017	Xi'an City Sports Park Gymnasium	Xi'an, China
21	Wu Lin Feng 2017: New Zealand VS China	August 19, 2017	ASB Stadium	Auckland, New Zealand
20	W.A.R.S. 17	August 9, 2017	Aba Tibetan and Qiang Autonomous Prefecture	Sichuan, China
19	Wu Lin Feng 2017: China VS Thailand	August 5, 2017	Henan TV Studio 8	Zhengzhou, China
18	W.A.R.S. 16	July 22, 2017	Henan TV Studio 8	Zhengzhou, Henan, China
17	Wu Lin Feng 2017: Russia VS China & ACB KB 10	July 15, 2017	Izmailovo Sports Palace	Moscow, Russia
16	Wu Lin Feng 2017: China VS Spain	July 1, 2017	Henan TV Studio 8	Zhengzhou, Henan, China
15	Wu Lin Feng 2017: Australia VS China	June 24, 2017	Luna Park Sydney	Sydney, Australia
14	W.A.R.S. 15	June 19, 2017	Henan TV Studio 8	Zhengzhou, Henan, China
13	Wu Lin Feng 2017: Romania VS China	June 16, 2017	Sala Olimpia	Timișoara, Romania
12	Wu Lin Feng 2017: China VS Japan	June 3, 2017	Helong Gymnasium	Changsha, China
11	W.A.R.S. 14	May 20, 2017	Henan TV Studio 8	Zhengzhou, Henan, China
10	Wu Lin Feng 2017: East VS West	May 16, 2017	Hershey Centre	Mississauga, Canada
09	Wu Lin Feng 2017: China VS USA	May 6, 2017	Henan TV Studio 8	Zhengzhou, Henan, China
08	W.A.R.S. 13	April 22, 2017	Henan TV Studio 8	Zhengzhou, Henan, China
07	Wu Lin Feng 2017: Thailand VS China	April 15, 2017	Central Park Rama 2	Bangkok, Thailand
06	Wu Lin Feng 2017: China VS Europe	April 1, 2017	Henan TV Studio 8	Zhengzhou, Henan, China
05	W.A.R.S. 12	March 11, 2017	Henan TV Studio 8	Zhengzhou, Henan, China
04	Wu Lin Feng 2017: Kung Fu VS Muay Thai	March 4, 2017	Henan TV Studio 8	Zhengzhou, Henan, China
03	Wu Lin Feng 2017: Battle of the Golden Triangle	February 10, 2017	Golden triangle special economic zone	Bokeo Province, Laos
02	Wu Lin Feng World Championship 2017	January 14, 2017	Henan TV Studio 8	Zhengzhou, Henan, China
01	W.A.R.S. 11: World Championship 2017	January 6, 2017	Henan TV Studio 8	Zhengzhou, Henan, China

== Wu Lin Feng 2017: China VS Spain ==
Wu Lin Feng 2017: China VS Spain
- Promotion: Wu Lin Feng
- Date: December 03, 2017
- City: China

Wu Lin Feng 2017: China VS Spain was a kickboxing event held on December 3, 2017 in China.

=== Results ===
Main Card
Weight Class				Method	Round	Time	Notes
-60 kg	(China) Wang Junyu	vs.	(Spain) Leon Motrato Roma
-63 kg	(China) Liu Qiliang	vs.	(Spain) Eduard Del Prado
-65 kg	(China) Meng Guodong	vs.	(Spain) Khyzer Hayat
-70 kg	(China) Song Shaoqiu	vs.	(Spain) Antonio Gomez
-70 kg	(China) Hu Yafei	vs.	(Spain) Elam Ngor

== Wu Lin Feng 2017: China VS Canada ==
Wu Lin Feng 2017: China VS Canada
- Promotion: Wu Lin Feng
- Date: December 02, 2017
- City: Zhengzhou, China

Wu Lin Feng 2017: China VS Canada was a kickboxing event held on December 2, 2017 in Zhengzhou, China.

=== Results ===
Main Card
Weight Class				Method	Round	Time	Notes
-67 kg	(China) Miao Wei	def.	(Canada) Jason Hinds	Decision	3	3:00
-64 kg	(Canada) Brandon Leaman	def.	(China) Cao Zuoyuan	Decision	3	3:00
-68 kg	(China) Xie Lei	def.	(Canada) Maaurice Pompey	Decision	3	3:00
-75 kg	(China) Sun Weiqiang	def.	(Canada) Mathew Kendall	Decision	3	3:00
Women -57 kg	(China) Mao Ning	def.	(Canada) Janice Lyn	Decision	3	3:00
-66 kg	(China) Long Yu	def.	(Canada) Eric James Rocha	Decision	3	3:00
-61 kg	(China) Lu Pinbo	def.	(Canada) Paolo Millo	Decision	3	3:00
-65 kg	(China) Zhang Songshan	vs.	(Canada) Karlo Panugao
-67 kg	(China) Lu Jun	vs.	(Russia) Sergey Kosykh
-65 kg	(China) Lei Penghui	vs.	(Canada) Cody Kent
-72 kg	(China) Li Yu	vs.	(Canada) Adam Weber
-75 kg	(China) Gui Jiang	vs.	(Canada) Thomas Raby
-68 kg	(China) Zheng Ke	vs.	(Canada) Ferdaws Nayimi
-56 kg	(China) Ale	vs.	(Canada) Ross Mylet

== Wu Lin Feng 2017: WCK Muaythai vs Wu Lin Feng ==
Wu Lin Feng 2017: WCK Muaythai vs Wu Lin Feng
- Promotion: Wu Lin Feng
- Date: November 18, 2017
- Venue: The Orleans
- City: Las Vegas, United States

Wu Lin Feng 2017: WCK Muaythai vs Wu Lin Feng was a kickboxing event held on November 18, 2017 at The Orleans in Las Vegas.

=== Results ===
Main Card
Weight Class				Method	Round	Time
-70 kg	(United States) Nick Chasteen	def.	(China) Zhang Ren	KO	2
-58 kg	(United States) Adam Rothweiler	def.	(United States) Xue Shenzhen	Decision (Unanimous)	3	3:00
-75 kg	(China) Sun Weichao	def.	(United States) Joshua Shepard	Decision (Split)	3	3:00
-70 kg	(Nigeria) Anthony Njokuani	def.	(China) Li Yankun	Decision (Unanimous)	3	3:00
-65 kg	(United States) TJ Arcangel	def.	(China) Jin Ying	Decision (Unanimous)	3	3:00
Women -54 kg	(China) Huang Shiqing	def.	(France) Fadma Basrir	Decision (Split)	3	3:00
-91 kg	(China) Hao Guanghua	def.	(United States) Joshua Todd	KO	1
-61 kg	(United States) Travis Clay	def.	(China) Chen Wende	TKO	2
-61 kg	(China) Zhao Chongyang	def.	(United States) Joe Gogo	Decision (Majority)	3	3:00

== Wu Lin Feng 2017: Yi Long VS Sitthichai ==
Wu Lin Feng 2017: Yi Long VS Sitthichai
- Promotion: Wu Lin Feng
- Date: November 4, 2017
- Venue: Kunming Sports Center Gymnasium
- City: Kunming, China

Event chronology
Wu Lin Feng 2017: World Championship Hong Kong	Wu Lin Feng 2017: Yi Long VS Sitthichai

Wu Lin Feng 2017: Yi Long VS Sitthichai was a kickboxing event held on November 4, 2017 at the Kunming Sports Center Gymnasium in Kunming, China.

=== Results ===
Main Event
Weight Class				Method	Round	Time	Notes
WLF Yi Long challenge
71 kg	(Thailand) Sitthichai Sitsongpeenong	def.	(China) Yi Long	KO (Left High Kick)	2	1:10	For the Wu Lin Feng -71 kg World Championship
Women -56 kg	(China) Mao Ning	def.	(Portugal) Maria Lobo	Decision	3	3:00
-70 kg	(Turkey) Hasan Toy	def.	(China) Zhong Weipeng	TKO	3
-70 kg	(China) Song Shaoqiu	def.	(Netherlands) Brown Pinas	Decision	3	3:00
-64 kg	(Romania) Adrian Maxim	def.	(China) Jin Ying	Ext.R Decision	3	3:00
-63 kg	(Netherlands) Jan Kaffa	def.	(China) Qin Jinxu	KO (knee to the body)	1
-65 kg	(Germany) Dennis Wosik	def.	(China) Zhao Chuanlin	Decision	3	3:00
-63 kg	(China) Liu Qiliang	vs.	(Japan) Kiyotaro
-68 kg	(China) Ji Xiang	vs.	(Thailand) Teerachai
-61 kg	(China) Yuan Ya	vs.	(Japan) Kanta Tabuchi
-70 kg	(Netherlands) Younes Smaili	def.	(China) Li Yankun	Decision	3	3:00
-80 kg	(China) Wang Zhiguo	vs.	(New Zealand) Mark Timms

== Wu Lin Feng 2017: World Championship Hong Kong ==
Wu Lin Feng 2017: World Championship Hong Kong
- Promotion: Wu Lin Feng; KF1
- Date: October 14, 2017
- Venue: Wanchai Southorn Stadium
- City: Hong Kong

Wu Lin Feng 2017: World Championship Hong Kong was a kickboxing event held on October 14, 2017 at the Wanchai Southorn Stadium in Hong Kong.

=== Results ===
Main Event
Weight Class				Method	Round	Time	Notes
-62 kg		vs.					4 man Tournament Final
-68 kg	(China) Yang Zhuo	def.	(Netherlands) Ouail Karroumi	Decision (Unanimous)	3	3:00
-71 kg	(South Africa) Cee Khubone	vs.	(Hong Kong) Hon Kin
-54 kg	(Hong Kong) Suen King	vs.	(Philippines) Jervie
-48 kg	(Hong Kong) Tik Chan	vs.	(Philippines) Danilo
-60 kg	(China) Ji Xiang	vs.	(Netherlands) Bowie
-60 kg	(China) Chen Wende	vs.	(New Zealand) Nikora
-58 kg	(Hong Kong) Hon Ki Lam	vs.	(France) Brian
-63 kg	(China) Xue Shenzhen	vs.	(New Zealand) Dominic Reed
-63 kg	(Hong Kong) Hon Ki Lam	vs.	(France) Brian
-63 kg	(Hong Kong) Chin Wei Tsao	vs.	(Hong Kong) Chi Hang Chow
-43 kg	(Hong Kong) Thomas Chan	vs.	(Thailand) Pariwat
-62 kg	(China) Wang Zhiwei	vs.	(United States) Kanaina				4 man Tournament Semi-final
-62 kg	(Hong Kong) Chin Anson	vs.	(France) Najib				4 man Tournament Semi-final
-55 kg	(Hong Kong) Ting Hin Chan	vs.	(Philippines) Vander
-51 kg	(Hong Kong) Rice Wong	vs.	(China) Yang Yitong
-57 kg	(Hong Kong) Otway Chan	vs.	(Hong Kong) King Han Chan
-56 kg	(Hong Kong) Hon Yuen Lai	vs.	(Hong Kong) Chi Sing Cheung
Women -52 kg	(China) Lu Jiuxin	vs.	(China) Xie Xinting

== Wu Lin Feng 2017: WLF VS ACB & ACB KB 11 ==
Wu Lin Feng 2017: WLF VS ACB & ACB KB 11
- Promotion: Wu Lin Feng
- Date: October 7, 2017
- Venue: Henan TV Studio 8
- City: Zhengzhou, China

Event chronology
Wu Lin Feng 2017: World Championship Xi'an	Wu Lin Feng 2017: WLF VS ACB & ACB KB 11	Wu Lin Feng 2017: World Championship Hong Kong

Wu Lin Feng 2017: WLF VS ACB & ACB KB 11 was a kickboxing event held on October 7, 2017 at the Henan TV Studio 8 in Zhengzhou, China.

=== Results ===
Main Event
Weight Class				Method	Round	Time	Notes
90 kg	(Belarus) Igor Bugaenko	def.	(China) Hao Guanghua	Decision (Unanimous)	3	3:00
Co Main Event
70 kg	(China) Song Shaoqiu	def.	(Russia) Vadim Davydov	Ex.R Decision (Split)	4	3:00
WLF Yi Long challenge
71 kg	(Thailand) Sitthichai Sitsongpeenong	def.	(Russia) Dzhabar Askerov	Decision (Unanimous)	3	3:00	2017 WLF Yi Long challenge Tournament Final
Masters Series
Woman 54 kg	(China) Gong Yanli	def.	(Russia) Galina Popova	Decision (Unanimous)	3	3:00
67 kg	(South Sudan) Lofogo Sarour	def.	(China) Ji Xiang	Decision (Unanimous)	3	3:00
66 kg	(Russia) Tamerlan Bashirov	def.	(China) Lu Jun
63 kg	(China) Jin Ying	def.	(Russia) Rodion Sheremet	Decision (Unanimous)	3	3:00
61 kg	(Russia) Timur Nadrov	def.	(China) Chen Wende	Decision (Unanimous)	3	3:00
60 kg	(China) Wang Junyu	def.	(Ukraine) Konstantin Trishin
75 kg	(China) Li Hui	def.	(Russia) Islam Khozhdevdiev
68 kg	(China) Zhang Ren	vs.	(Japan) Daiki Yoshinuma
65 kg	(China) Fu Qingnan	def.	(Russia) Zubaira Suleimanov
60 kg	(China) Zhu Shuai	def.	(South Africa) Ncedo Gomba

=== 2017 WLF Yi Long challenge Tournament −71 kg bracket ===
Quarter-finals (2017-4-1 / 5-6 / 6-3 / 7-1)
(Belarus) Chingiz Allazov	DEC
(Thailand) Saiyok Pumpanmuang	R3
(Russia) Dzhabar Askerov	KO
(Colombia) Christopher Mena	R2
(Germany) Enriko Kehl	DEC
(Brazil) Ravy Brunow	R3
(Thailand) Sitthichai Sitsongpeenong	DEC
(Netherlands) Hassan Toy	R3

Semi-finals (2017-8-5 / 9-2)
(Belarus) Chingiz Allazov	DEC
(Russia) Dzhabar Askerov	R3
(Germany) Enriko Kehl	R3
(Thailand) Sitthichai Sitsongpeenong	DEC

Final (2017-10-7)
(Russia) Dzhabar Askerov [1]	R3
(Thailand) Sitthichai Sitsongpeenong	DEC

[1] Chingiz Allazov injured, Dzhabar Askerov substitutes for battle.

== Wu Lin Feng 2017: World Championship Xi'an ==
Wu Lin Feng 2017: World Championship Xi'an
- Promotion: Wu Lin Feng
- Date: September 2, 2017
- Venue: Xi'an City Sports Park Gymnasium
- City: Xi'an, China

Event chronology
Wu Lin Feng 2017: New Zealand VS China	Wu Lin Feng 2017: World Championship Xi'an	Wu Lin Feng 2017: WLF VS ACB & ACB KB 11

Wu Lin Feng 2017: World Championship Xi'an was a kickboxing event held on September 2, 2017 at the Xi'an City Sports Park Gymnasium in Xi'an, China.

=== Results ===
Main Card
Weight Class				Method	Round	Time	Notes
63 kg	(Belgium) Nafi Bilalovski	def.	(China) Zheng Bo	Decision (Unanimous)	3	3:00	63 kg World Tournament Semi-final 1
63 kg	(China) Wang Zhiwei	def.	(Morocco) Ali Zoubai	Decision (Unanimous)	3	3:00	63 kg World Tournament Semi-final 2
60 kg	(China) Wang Wanben	def.	(Japan) Taio Asahisa	Decision (Unanimous)	3	3:00
60 kg	(Japan) Hirotaka Asahisa	def.	(China) Zhao Chongyang	Decision (Unanimous)	3	3:00
68 kg	(China) Yang Zhuo	def.	(Romania) Adrian Pețenchea	Decision (Unanimous)	3	3:00
71 kg	(Thailand) Sitthichai Sitsongpeenong	def.	(Germany) Enriko Kehl	Decision (Unanimous)	3	3:00	2017 WLF Yi Long challenge Tournament Semifinal 2
63 kg	(Belgium) Nafi Bilalovski	def.	(China) Wang Zhiwei	KO	1		63 kg World Tournament final
76 kg	(Thailand) Thongchai Sitsongpeenong	def.	(China) Sun Weiqiang	Decision (Unanimous)	3	3:00
68 kg	(New Zealand) Pumipi Kahurangi	def.	(China) Zhang Ren	Decision (Unanimous)	3	3:00

=== 2017 WLF World Championship Tournament −63 kg bracket ===
Semi-finals		Final
(China) Zheng Bo	3R.
(Belgium) Nafi Bilalovski	DEC	(Belgium) Nafi Bilalovski	KO
(China) Wang Zhiwei	DEC	(China) Wang Zhiwei	1R.
(Morocco) Ali Zoubai	3R.

== Wu Lin Feng 2017: New Zealand VS China ==
Wu Lin Feng 2017: New Zealand VS China
- Promotion: Wu Lin Feng
- Date: August 19, 2017
- Venue: ASB Stadium
- City: Auckland, New Zealand

Event chronology
Wu Lin Feng 2017: China VS Thailand	Wu Lin Feng 2017: New Zealand VS China	Wu Lin Feng 2017: World Championship Xi'an

Wu Lin Feng 2017: New Zealand VS China was a kickboxing event held on August 19, 2017 at the ASB Stadium in Auckland, New Zealand.

=== Results ===
Main Card
Weight Class				Method	Round	Time	Notes
63 kg	(China) Qin Jinxu	vs.	(New Zealand) Jeffrey		3	3:00
58 kg	(China) Xue Shenzheng	vs.	(New Zealand) Dominic		3	3:00
65 kg	(China) Liu Qiliang	vs.	(New Zealand) Kayne		3	3:00
Woman 60 kg	(China) Zhang Ye	vs.	(New Zealand) Katie		3	3:00
81 kg	(China) Wang Zhiguo	vs.	(New Zealand) Alexander Redhean		3	3:00
91 kg	(China) Hao Guanghua	vs.	(New Zealand) Sigi		3	3:00
68 kg	(China) Ji Xiang	def.	(New Zealand) John Clapperton	KO	1
72 kg	(China) Song Shaoqiu	def.	(New Zealand) Hayden Todd	KO (Knee)	2	1:20
70 kg	(China) Zhong Weipeng	vs.	(New Zealand) Harley Love		3	3:00
75 kg	(China) Wu Sihan	vs.	(New Zealand) Sefo		3	3:00

== Wu Lin Feng 2017: China VS Thailand ==
Wu Lin Feng 2017: China VS Thailand
- Promotion: Wu Lin Feng
- Date: August 5, 2017
- Venue: Henan TV Studio 8
- City: Zhengzhou, China

Event chronology
Wu Lin Feng 2017: Russia VS China & ACB KB 10	Wu Lin Feng 2017: China VS Thailand	Wu Lin Feng 2017: New Zealand VS China

Wu Lin Feng 2017: China VS Thailand was a kickboxing event held on August 5, 2017 at the Henan TV Studio 8 in Zhengzhou, China.

=== Results ===
Main Card
Weight Class				Method	Round	Time	Notes
60 kg	(China) Chen Wende	def.	(Thailand) Eakbangsai	Decision (Unanimous)	3	3:00
64 kg	(Thailand) Thanonchai Thanakorngym	def.	(China) Jin Ying	Decision (Unanimous)	3	3:00
Woman 54 kg	(China) Huang Li	def.	(Thailand) Daowsitang	Decision (Split)	3	3:00
67 kg	(China) Wang Pengfei	def.	(Thailand) Singsuriya	Decision (Unanimous)	3	3:00
68 kg	(China) Yang Zhuo	def.	(Thailand) Ratchasing	Decision (Unanimous)	3	3:00
71 kg	(Belarus) Chingiz Allazov	def.	(Russia) Dzhabar Askerov	Decision (Unanimous)	3	3:00	2017 WLF Yi Long challenge Tournament Semifinal 1
70 kg	(Thailand) Pathmai Kor.Norongsak	def.	(China) Li Yankun	Decision (Unanimous)	3	3:00
62 kg	(China) Zhu Shuai	vs.	(Thailand) Somchat Kittisak
63 kg	(China) Fang Feida	vs.	(Thailand) Se Sor.ploenchit

== Wu Lin Feng 2017: Russia VS China & ACB KB 10 ==
Wu Lin Feng 2017: Russia VS China & ACB KB 10
- Promotion: Wu Lin Feng
- Date: July 15, 2017
- Venue: Izmailovo Sports Palace
- City: Moscow, Russia

Event chronology
Wu Lin Feng 2017: China VS Spain	Wu Lin Feng 2017: Russia VS China & ACB KB 10	Wu Lin Feng 2017: China VS Thailand

Wu Lin Feng 2017: Russia VS China & ACB KB 10 was a kickboxing event held on July 15, 2017 at the Izmailovo Sports Palace in Moscow, Russia.

=== Results ===
Main Event
Weight Class				Method	Round	Time
77 kg	(Russia) Alexander Stetsurenko	def.	(Belgium) Zakaria Baitar	TKO (Leg Injury)	2	1:06
Co Main Event
85 kg	(Belarus) Igor Bugaenko	def.	(Morocco) Hicham El Gaoui	Decision (Unanimous)	3	3:00
Masters Series
70 kg	(Russia) Vadim Davydov	def.	(China) Zhang Ren	Decision (Unanimous)	3	3:00
95 kg+	(Ukraine) Tsotne Rogava	def.	(Germany) Vladimir Toktasynov	KO (Knee)	3	0:48
-95 kg	(Russia) Beybulat Isaev	def.	(China) Hao Guanghua	Decision (Unanimous)	3	3:00
65 kg	(Russia) Tamerlan Bashirov	def.	(Russia) Vitaliy Volosovskiy	Decision (Unanimous)	3	3:00
Woman 56 kg	(Russia) Di Umarova	def.	(China) Li Mingrui	Decision (Unanimous)	3	3:00
65 kg	(Germany) Denis Wosik	def.	(Russia) Said Magomedov	KO (Body Kick)	3	1:19
77 kg	(Russia) Islam Khozhdevdiev	def.	(Russia) Alexander Ermoshin	TKO (Punches)	3	2:07
70 kg	(Russia) Rashid Salikhov	def.	(China) Li Yankun	Decision (Unanimous)	3	3:00
Russia vs. China
65 kg	(Russia) Nikita Surovezhkin	def.	(China) Liu Qiliang	Decision (Unanimous)	3	3:00
65 kg	(Russia) Rodion Sheremet	def.	(China) Wang Shanwei	Decision (Unanimous)	3	3:00
65 kg	(China) Chen Wende	def.	(Russia) Marat Kichikhanov	KO (Head Kick)	2	0:40
70 kg	(Russia) Murad Arzulaev	def.	(China) Xiong Ziquang	Decision (Unanimous)	3	3:00
77 kg	(Russia) Arslan Magomedov	def.	(China) Yang Kunshan	Decision (Unanimous)	3	3:00
60 kg	(China) Xue Shenghen	def.	(Russia) Rolan Guliev	Decision (Unanimous)	3	3:00

== Wu Lin Feng 2017: China VS Spain ==
Wu Lin Feng 2017: China VS Spain
- Promotion: Wu Lin Feng
- Date: July 1, 2017
- Venue: Henan TV Studio 8
- City: Zhengzhou, Henan, China

Event chronology
Wu Lin Feng 2017: Australia VS China	Wu Lin Feng 2017: China VS Spain	Wu Lin Feng 2017: Russia VS China & ACB KB 10

Wu Lin Feng 2017: China VS Spain was a kickboxing event held on July 1, 2017 at the Henan TV Studio 8 in Zhengzhou, Henan, China.

=== Results ===
Main Card
Weight Class				Method	Round	Time	Notes
60 kg	(China) Zhao Chongyang	def.	(Spain) Andres Unzue	TKO	2	1:00
64 kg	(China) Jin Ying	def.	(Spain) Carlos Campos	TKO	2	0:20
Women 54 kg	(China) Gong Yanli	def.	(Spain) Myriame djedidi	Decision (Unanimous)	3	3:00
68 kg	(China) Ji Xiang	def.	(Spain) Nelson Buale	TKO	3	2:03
71 kg	(Thailand) Sitthichai Sitsongpeenong	def.	(Netherlands) Hassan Toy	Decision (Unanimous)	3	3:00	2017 WLF Yi Long challenge Tournament 1/4 finals 4
69 kg	(Spain) Erik Garcia	def.	(China) Xie Lei	Decision (Unanimous)	3	3:00
70 kg	(China) Zhong Weipeng	def.	(Spain) Mikel Sortion	Decision (Unanimous)	3	3:00
75 kg	(Spain) David Martinez	def.	(China) Wu Sihan	Decision (Unanimous)	3	3:00
79 kg	(Belarus) Dmitriy Baranov	def.	(China) Chen Yawei	Decision (Unanimous)	3	3:00

== Wu Lin Feng 2017: Australia VS China ==
Wu Lin Feng 2017: Australia VS China
- Promotion: Wu Lin Feng
- Date: June 24, 2017
- Venue: Luna Park Sydney
- City: Sydney, Australia

Event chronology
Wu Lin Feng 2017: Romania VS China	Wu Lin Feng 2017: Australia VS China	Wu Lin Feng 2017: China VS Spain

Wu Lin Feng 2017: Australia VS China was a kickboxing event held on June 24, 2017 at the Luna Park Sydney in Sydney, Australia.

=== Results ===
Main Card
Weight Class				Method	Round	Time	Notes
63 kg	(Australia) Terry Kounsavat	vs.	(China) Wang Zhiwei		3	3:00
68 kg	(Australia) Lindon Wotton	vs.	(China) Yang Zhuo		3	3:00
67 kg	(Australia) Phisit Suksawang	vs.	(China) Wang Pengfei		3	3:00
60 kg	(Australia) Josh Tonna	def.	(China) Yuan Ya	Decision (Split)	3	3:00
69 kg	(Australia) Nathan Robson	vs.	(China) Li Yankun		3	3:00
75 kg	(China) Sun Weipeng	def.	(Australia) Jason Scerri	TKO	1
74 kg	(Australia) Marco Tentori	vs.	(China) Sun Weiqiang		3	3:00
Women 54 kg	(Australia) Courtney Fox	vs.	(China) Huang Li		3	3:00
70 kg	(Australia) Jayy Tonkin	vs.	(China) Song Shaoqiu		3	3:00

== Wu Lin Feng 2017: Romania VS China ==
Wu Lin Feng 2017: Romania VS China
- Promotion: Wu Lin Feng
- Date: June 16, 2017
- Venue: Sala Constantin Jude
- City: Timișoara, Romania

Event chronology
Wu Lin Feng 2017: China VS Japan	Wu Lin Feng 2017: Romania VS China	Wu Lin Feng 2017: Australia VS China

Wu Lin Feng 2017: Romania VS China or GFC 2: Romania VS China was a kickboxing event promoted by the Wu Lin Feng in association with Golden Fighter Championship on June 16, 2017 at the Sala Constantin Jude in Timișoara, Romania.

The event aired live on Digi Sport. It will also be covered by Henan TV.

Romania beat China 6-4.

=== Background ===
This event featured a fight between Wu Lin Feng intercontinental champion Hao Guanghua and Bogdan Stoica as headliner.

=== Results ===
Main Card
Weight Class				Method	Round	Time	Notes
Heavyweight	(Romania) Bogdan Stoica	def.	(China) Hao Guanghua	Decision (split)	3	3:00	Main Event
Super Middleweight	(Romania) Adrian Mitu	def.	(China) Ding Meng	Decision (split)	3	3:00
Light Welterweight	(Romania) Adrian Maxim	def.	(China) Liu Qiliang	Decision (unanimous)	3	3:00
Light Heavyweight	(China) Duoli Chen	def.	(Romania) Mădălin Mogoș	Decision	3	3:00
Light Middleweight	(Romania) Haris Ferizovic	vs.	(China) Hu Yafei		3	3:00
Middleweight	(Romania) Gabriel Bozan	def.	(China) Yang Kunshan	Decision (unanimous)	3	3:00
Light Heavyweight	(China) Wang Zhiguo	def.	(Romania) Marko Milanović	Decision (split)	3	3:00
Welterweight	(Romania) Adrian Peţenchea	def.	(China) Miao Wei	Decision	3	3:00
Light Welterweight	(China) Jin Ying	def.	(Romania) Jóni Máté	TKO (towel thrown)	3	2:32
Lightweight	(China) Xue Shenzhen	def.	(Romania) Roberto Cercel	Decision	3	3:00
Undercard
Junior Welterweight	(Romania) Gabriel Cobzaru	vs.	(Netherlands) Jan Kaffa		3	3:00
Super Heavyweight	(Romania) Marius Munteanu	vs.	(Romania) Ionuţ Iancu		3	3:00

== Wu Lin Feng 2017: China VS Japan ==
Wu Lin Feng 2017: China VS Japan
- Promotion: Wu Lin Feng
- Date: June 3, 2017
- Venue: Helong Gymnasium
- City: Changsha, China

Event chronology
Wu Lin Feng 2017: East VS West	Wu Lin Feng 2017: China VS Japan	Wu Lin Feng 2017: Romania VS China

Wu Lin Feng 2017: China VS Japan was a kickboxing event held on June 3, 2017 at the Helong Gymnasium in Changsha, China.

=== Results ===
Fight Card
Weight Class				Method	Round	Time	Notes
67 kg	(China) Chu Han	vs.	(Netherlands) Juan Javier		3	3:00
77 kg	(China) Wei Gaojie	vs.	(Germany) Haschim Momani		3	3:00
70 kg	(China) Ji Xiang	def.	(Japan) Fujimura Daisuke	Decision (Unanimous)	3	3:00
60 kg	(China) Feng Liang	def.	(Japan) Yamamoto Masahir	Decision (Unanimous)	3	3:00
Women 57 kg	(China) Gong Yanli	def.	(Japan) Ozawa Satoko	Decision (Unanimous)	3	3:00
65 kg	(China) Wang Pengfei	def.	(Japan) Hayashi Shota	Decision (Unanimous)	3	3:00
66 kg	(China) Yang Zhuo	def.	(Japan) Fumiya	Decision (Unanimous)	3	3:00
71 kg	(Germany) Enriko Kehl	def.	(Brazil) Ravy Brunow	Decision (Unanimous)	3	3:00	2017 WLF Yi Long challenge Tournament 1/4 finals 3
64 kg	(Japan) Sasaki Daizo	def.	(China) Jin Ying	Decision (Split)	3	3:00
66 kg	(China) Xie Lie	vs.	(Thailand) Puangpornkao Por.Burapha		3	3:00

== Wu Lin Feng 2017: East VS West ==
Wu Lin Feng 2017: East VS West
- Promotion: Wu Lin Feng
- Date: May 16, 2017
- Venue: Hershey Centre
- City: Mississauga, Ontario, Canada

Event chronology
Wu Lin Feng 2017: China VS USA	Wu Lin Feng 2017: East VS West	Wu Lin Feng 2017: China VS Japan

Wu Lin Feng 2017: East VS West was a kickboxing event held on May 16, 2017 at the Hershey Centre in Mississauga, Ontario, Canada.

=== Results ===
Fight Card
Weight Class				Method	Round	Time	Notes
Woman 52 kg	(China) Ren Kailin	vs.	(Canada) Farinaz Lari		3	3:00
Woman 56 kg	(China) Huang Li	def.	(Canada) Christina Best	Decision (Unanimous)	3	3:00
80 kg	(China) Wang Zhiguo	vs.	(Canada) Ali Khanjari		3	3:00
75 kg	(China) Sun Weiqiang	def.	(Canada) Jake Mackenzie	Decision (Split)	3	3:00
70 kg	(Canada) Cezary Marek Kozlowski	def.	(China) Li Yankun	DQ(No binding belt)	3	3:00
75 kg	(China) Yang Kunshan	def.	(Canada) Zack George	TKO	3
71 kg	(Canada) Matthew Kendall	def.	(China) Song Shaoqiu	Decision (Unanimous)	3	3:00
67 kg	(China) Yang Zhuo	def.	(Canada) Jason Hinds	Decision (Split)	3	3:00
65 kg	(China) Liu Qiliang	def.	(Canada) Cody Kent	TKO	2
58 kg	(Canada) Ross Mylet	def.	(China) Wu Huiqiang	Decision (Split)	3	3:00
63.5 kg	(Canada) Aaron Wilson	def.	(Canada) Teshay Gothrou	Decision (Unanimous)	3	3:00	Winner: Aaron Wilson by unanimous decision (UD)

== Wu Lin Feng 2017: -63kg World Tournament ==
Wu Lin Feng 2017: -63kg World Tournament
- Promotion: Wu Lin Feng
- Date: May 6, 2017
- Venue: Henan TV Studio 8
- City: Zhengzhou, Henan, China

Event chronology
Wu Lin Feng 2017: Thailand VS China	Wu Lin Feng 2017: -63kg World Tournament	Wu Lin Feng 2017: East VS West

Wu Lin Feng 2017: -63 kg World Tournament was a kickboxing event held on May 6, 2017 at the Henan TV Studio 8 in Zhengzhou, Henan, China.

=== Results ===
Fight Card
Weight Class				Method	Round	Time	Notes
63 kg	(Spain) Daniel Puertas Gallardo	vs.	(China) Chen Wende	KO	2		63 kg World Tournament Group B final
68 kg	(China) Xiong Zhiqiang	vs.	(Russia) Shamil Gasanbeiov		3	3:00
63 kg	(China) Wang Shanwei	vs.	(Belgium) Nafi Bilalovski		3	3:00	63 kg World Tournament Group A Semifinal 1
63 kg	(China) Jin Ying	def.	(Thailand) Samransak	Decision (Unanimous)	3	3:00	63 kg World Tournament Group A Semifinal 2
60 kg	(Australia) Josh Tonna	vs.	(China) Yuan Ya
67 kg	(China) Wu Jianan	vs.	(Netherlands) Ouail Karroumi		3	3:00
67 kg	(China) Xie Lei	vs.	(Netherlands) Lennart Blijd		3	3:00
63 kg	(Spain) Daniel Puertas Gallardo	def.	(Hong Kong) Chin Ngaichung	KO	1		63 kg World Tournament Group B Semifinal 1
63 kg	(China) Chen Wende	def.	(United Kingdom) Daniel Terry		3	3:00	63 kg World Tournament Group B Semifinal 2
60 kg	(Japan) Hirotaka Asahisa	def.	(South Africa) Ncedo Gomba	Decision (Unanimous)	3	3:00	60 kg World Tournament Semifinal 1
60 kg	(Spain) Javier Hernandez	def.	(China) Wang Junyu	Decision (Unanimous)	3	3:00	60 kg World Tournament Semifinal 2
63 kg	(China) Wang Zhiwei	def.	(United States) Joe Gogo	Decision (Unanimous)	3	3:00
Woman 57 kg	(United States) Kate Sholy	def.	(China) Huang Li	Decision (Split)	3	3:00
91 kg	(China) Hao Guanghua	def.	(United States) Jake heun	Decision (Unanimous)	3	3:00
71 kg	(Russia) Dzhabar Askerov	def.	(Colombia) Cristopher Mena	KO (left cross)	1	2:43	2017 WLF Yi Long challenge Tournament 1/4 finals 2
60 kg	(Spain) Javier Hernandez	def.	(Japan) Hirotaka Asahisa	Ext. R Decision (Unanimous)	4	3:00	60 kg World Tournament final
58 kg	(China) Xue Shenzhen	vs.	(United States) Adam Rothweiler		3	3:00
67 kg	(China) Wang Pengfei	def.	(Netherlands) Massaro Glunder	Decision (Unanimous)	3	3:00

=== 2017 WLF World Championship Tournament −60 kg bracket ===
Semi-finals		Final
(South Africa) Ncedo Gomba	3R.
(Japan) Asahisa Hirotaka	DEC	(Japan) Asahisa Hirotaka	4R.
(China) Wang Junyu ^{1}	3R.	(Spain) Javier Hernandez	DEC
(Spain) Javier Hernandez	DEC

^{1} Eduard Mikhovich Retire, Wang Junyu Substitute play.

=== 2017 WLF World Championship Group A Tournament −63 kg bracket ===
Semi-finals	Final
(China) Wang Shanwei
(Belgium) Nafi Bilalovski
(China) Jin Ying
(Thailand) Samransak

=== 2017 WLF World Championship Group B Tournament −63 kg bracket ===
Semi-finals		Final
(Hong Kong) Chin Ngaichung	1
(Spain) Daniel Puertas Gallardo	KO	(Spain) Daniel Puertas Gallardo	KO
(China) Chen Wende		(China) Chen Wende	2
(United Kingdom) Daniel Terry

== Wu Lin Feng 2017: Thailand VS China ==
Wu Lin Feng 2017: Thailand VS China
- Promotion: Wu Lin Feng
- Date: April 15, 2017
- Venue: Central Park Rama 2
- City: Bangkok, Thailand

Event chronology
Wu Lin Feng 2017: China VS Europe	Wu Lin Feng 2017: Thailand VS China	Wu Lin Feng 2017: China VS USA

Wu Lin Feng 2017: Thailand VS China was a kickboxing event, The result of " S1 World Championship " Thai New Year 2017, April 15, 2017 At Central Park Rama 2 in Bangkok, Thailand.

=== Results ===
Fight Card
Weight Class				Method	Round	Time
65 kg	(Thailand) Yodkhunpol Por.Muangpet	def.	(China) Miao Wei	Decision (Unanimous)	3	3:00
70 kg	(Thailand) Puangpornkao Por.Burapha	def.	(China) Zhang Dezheng	Decision (Unanimous)	3	3:00
56 kg	(Thailand) Pettape Krungtep	def.	(China) Li Mingrui	Decision (Unanimous)	3	3:00
62 kg	(China) Chen Wende	def.	(Thailand) Yodwicha Thanakorngym	Decision (Unanimous)	3	3:00
70 kg	(China) Xie Lei	def.	(Thailand) Kongnakonban Sor.KitRungRoj	Decision (Unanimous)	3	3:00
60 kg	(China) Zheng Ke	def.	(Thailand) Aphidet Sitpanuaw	Decision (Unanimous)	3	3:00
63 kg	(Thailand) Muangkorntong Sitchephanom	def.	(China) Fang Feida	Decision (Unanimous)	3	3:00
58 kg	(Thailand) Ruanthai dabpong191	def.	(China) Wu Huiqiang	TKO	1
60 kg	(Thailand) Petphupan Thanakorngym	def.	(China) Ren Xuelei	TKO	3
65 kg	(Thailand) Eakamnuay Cho.Chokamnuay	def.	(China) Liu Qiliang	Decision (Unanimous)	3	3:00

== Wu Lin Feng 2017: China VS Europe ==
Wu Lin Feng 2017: China VS Europe
- Promotion: Wu Lin Feng
- Date: April 1, 2017
- Venue: Henan TV Studio 8
- City: Zhengzhou, Henan, China

Event chronology
Wu Lin Feng 2017: Kung Fu VS Muay Thai	Wu Lin Feng 2017: China VS Europe	Wu Lin Feng 2017: Thailand VS China

Wu Lin Feng 2017: China VS Europe was a kickboxing event held on April 1, 2017 at the Henan TV Studio 8 in Zhengzhou, Henan, China.

=== Results ===
Fight Card
Weight Class				Method	Round	Time	Notes
60 kg	(Belarus) Eduard Mikhovich	def.	(China) Li Ning	Decision (Unanimous)	3	3:00	60 kg World Tournament Group C Semifinal 1
60 kg	(Russia) Paskhaev Umar	def.	(China) Zhu Shuai	Decision (Unanimous)	3	3:00	60 kg World Tournament Group C Semifinal 2
60 kg	(Spain) Javier Hernandez	def.	(China) Feng Liang	Decision (Unanimous)	3	3:00	60 kg World Tournament Group D Semifinal 1
60 kg	(Thailand) Kunbut	def.	(China) Yuan Ya	Decision (Unanimous)	3	3:00	60 kg World Tournament Group D Semifinal 2
63 kg	(Japan) Rukiya Anpo	def.	(China) Wang Zhiwei	Decision (Split)	3	3:00
63 kg	(China) Fang Feida	def.	(Thailand) Kao Pong	TKO	1
71 kg	(Turkey) Hasan Toy	def.	(China) Zhong Weipeng	TKO	3
60 kg	(China) Wang Junyu	def.	(Azerbaijan) Zohrab Azimovr	Decision (Unanimous)	3	3:00	60 kg World Tournament Reserve Fight
60 kg	(Belarus) Eduard Mikhovich	def.	(China) Zhu Shuai	Decision (Unanimous)	3	3:00	60 kg World Tournament Group C final
60 kg	(Spain) Javier Hernandez	def.	(Thailand) Kunbut	KO	3		60 kg World Tournament Group D final
64 kg	(Romania) Adrian Maxim	def.	(China) Liu Yong	Decision (Unanimous)	3	3:00
70 kg	(Germany) Wosik Denis Andreas	def.	(China) Li Yankun	Decision (Unanimous)	3	3:00
Woman 56 kg	(United Kingdom) Christi Brereton coral	def.	(China) Huang Li	Decision (Unanimous)	3	3:00
71 kg	(Belarus) Chingiz Allazov	def.	(Thailand) Saiyok Pumpanmuang	Decision (Unanimous)	3	3:00	2017 WLF Yi Long challenge Tournament 1/4 finals 1
68 kg	(China) Yang Zhuo	def.	(Germany) Rafik Habiat	Decision (Unanimous)	3	3:00
63 kg	(China) Jin Ying	def.	(Spain) Sergio Cabezas	Decision (Unanimous)	3	3:00
65 kg	(China) Yao Zhengpeng	def.	(Germany) Kevin Eiberg	Decision (Unanimous)	3	3:00
80 kg	(Netherlands) Regian Eersel	vs.	(China) Ma Yueheng	KO (knee to the body)	1	1:24
75 kg	(China) Yang Kunshan	vs.	(Poland) Zajac Bartosz Artur		3	3:00

=== 2017 WLF World Championship Group C Tournament −60 kg bracket ===
Semi-finals		Final
(China) Li Ning	3R.
(Belarus) Eduard Mikhovich	DEC	(Belarus) Eduard Mikhovich	DEC
(China) Zhu Shuai	3R.	(China) Zhu Shuai ^{1}	3R.
(Russia) Paskhaev Umar	DEC

^{1} Umar overweight 1.9 kg, Zhu Shuai promotion.

=== 2017 WLF World Championship Group D Tournament −60 kg bracket ===
Semi-finals		Final
(China) Feng Liang	3R.
(Spain) Javier Hernandez	DEC	(Spain) Javier Hernandez	KO
(China) Yuan Ya	3R.	(Thailand) Kunbut	3R.
(Thailand) Kunbut	DEC

== Wu Lin Feng 2017: Kung Fu VS Muay Thai ==
Wu Lin Feng 2017: Kung Fu VS Muay Thai
- Promotion: Wu Lin Feng
- Date: March 4, 2017
- Venue: Henan TV Studio 8
- City: Zhengzhou, Henan, China

Event chronology
Wu Lin Feng 2017: Battle of the Golden Triangle	Wu Lin Feng 2017: Kung Fu VS Muay Thai	Wu Lin Feng 2017: China VS Europe

Wu Lin Feng 2017: Kung Fu VS Muay Thai was a kickboxing event held on March 4, 2017 at the Henan TV Studio 8 in Zhengzhou, Henan, China.

=== Results ===
Fight Card
Weight Class				Method	Round	Time	Notes
60 kg	(Belgium) Hicham Moujtahid	def.	(China) Chen Wende	Decision (Unanimous)	3	3:00	60 kg World Tournament Group A Semifinal 1
60 kg	(South Africa) Ncedo Gomba	def.	(China) Xue Shenzheng	Decision (Unanimous)	3	3:00	60 kg World Tournament Group A Semifinal 2
60 kg	(Japan) Hirotaka Asahisa	def.	(China) Zhao Chongyang	Decision (Unanimous)	3	3:00	60 kg World Tournament Group B Semifinal 1
60 kg	(China) Zhao Fuxiang	def.	(Netherlands) Dimangio Jano	Decision (Unanimous)	3	3:00	60 kg World Tournament Group B Semifinal 2
Woman 56 kg	(China) Li Mingrui	def.	(Netherlands) Samantha Van Doorn	Decision (Unanimous)	3	3:00
60 kg	(South Africa) Ncedo Gomba	def.	(Belgium) Hicham Moujtahid	TKO	1	1:58	60 kg World Tournament Group A final
60 kg	(Japan) Hirotaka Asahisa	def.	(China) Zhao Fuxiang	Decision (Unanimous)	3	3:00	60 kg World Tournament Group B final
63 kg	(China) Wang Zhiwei	def.	(Thailand) Thong Mueangsema	Decision (Unanimous)	3	3:00
65 kg	(China) Wang Pengfei	def.	(Spain) Khyzer Hayat Nawaz	TKO	1
56 kg	(China) Huang Li	def.	(Netherlands) Mariela Kruse	Decision (Unanimous)	3	3:00
63 kg	(China) Jin Ying	def.	(Thailand) Kittachai	TKO	2
70 kg	(China) Xie Lei	def.	(Thailand) Chamnan Khaengkhan	Decision (Split)	3	3:00
73 kg	(China) Jiao Fukai	def.	(Italy) Rosario Presti	Decision (Unanimous)	3	3:00
65 kg	(Belgium) Nafi Bilalovski	def.	(China) Liu Qiliang	Decision (Unanimous)	3	3:00
70 kg	(Netherlands) Ramon Niamat	def.	(China) Wu Jianan	TKO	3

=== 2017 WLF World Championship Group A Tournament −60 kg bracket ===
Semi-finals		Final
(China) Chen Wende	3R.
(Belgium) Hicham Moujtahid	DEC	(Belgium) Hicham Moujtahid	1R.
(China) Xue Shenzheng	3R.	(South Africa) Ncedo Gomba	TKO
(South Africa) Ncedo Gomba	DEC

=== 2017 WLF World Championship Group B Tournament −60 kg bracket ===
Semi-finals		Final
(China) Zhao Chongyang	3R.
(Japan) Hirotaka Asahisa	DEC	(Japan) Hirotaka Asahisa	DEC
(China) Zhao Fuxiang	DEC	(China) Zhao Fuxiang	R3.
(Netherlands) Dimangio Jano	3R.

== Wu Lin Feng 2017: Battle of the Golden Triangle ==
Wu Lin Feng 2017: Battle of the Golden Triangle
- Promotion: Wu Lin Feng
- Date: February 10, 2017
- Venue: Golden Triangle Special Economic Zone
- City: Bokeo Province, Laos

Event chronology
Wu Lin Feng World Championship 2017	Wu Lin Feng 2017: Battle of the Golden Triangle	Wu Lin Feng 2017: Kung Fu VS Muay Thai

Wu Lin Feng 2017: Battle of the Golden Triangle was a kickboxing event held on February 10, 2017 at the Golden Triangle Special Economic Zone, Bokeo Province, Laos.

=== Results ===
Fight Card
Weight Class				Method	Round	Time	Notes
60 kg	(Laos) Khunchang Sorporpor.Lao	def.	(China) Xue Shenzhen
62 kg	(China) Yuan Ya	def.	(Thailand) LeklaiSor.Takuttong
63 kg	(China) Zhao Chongyang	def.	(Laos) Singyai Sorporpor
Woman 56 kg	(China) Huang Li	def.	(Thailand) Pettape Krungtep
62 kg	(China) Chen Wende	def.	(Thailand) Youdwicha Sor.Ritdet
63 kg	(China) Wang Junyu	def.	(Thailand) Petpikat Kunbut
64 kg	(China) Jin Ying	def.	(Cambodia) Thol Makara
72 kg	(China) Song Shaoqiu	def.	(United Kingdom) Kurtis Allen
70 kg	(Thailand) Chamnan Khaengkhan	def.	(China) Xiong Ziqiang
70 kg	(China) Zhang Dezheng	def.	(France) Mathias Gallo

== Wu Lin Feng World Championship 2017 ==
Wu Lin Feng World Championship 2017
- Promotion: Wu Lin Feng
- Date: January 14, 2017
- Venue: Henan TV Studio 8
- City: Zhengzhou, Henan, China

Event chronology
Wu Lin Feng World Championship 2016	Wu Lin Feng World Championship 2017	Wu Lin Feng 2017: Battle of the Golden Triangle

Wu Lin Feng World Championship 2017 was a kickboxing event held on January 14, 2017 at the Henan TV Studio 8 in Zhengzhou, Henan, China.

=== Results ===
Fight Card
Weight Class				Method	Round	Time	Notes
70 kg	(Netherlands) Hassan Toy	def.	(China) Song Shaoqiu	Decision (unanimous)	3	3:00	70 kg Tournament Reserve Fight
70 kg	(Germany) Enriko Kehl	def.	(Belarus) Farkhad Akhmejanau	Decision (unanimous)	3	3:00	70 kg Tournament Semifinals
70 kg	(Russia) Shamil Gasanbekov	def.	(China) Jiao Fukai	Decision (unanimous)	3	3:00	70 kg Tournament Semifinals
63 kg	(Romania) Adrian Maxim	def.	(China) Wang Zhiwei	Decision (unanimous)	3	3:00	63 kg 8-Man Tournament Quarterfinals
63 kg	(China) Jin Ying	def.	(Colombia) Joan Manuel Lique Cañaveral	Decision (unanimous)	3	3:00	63 kg 8-Man Tournament Quarterfinals
63 kg	(China) Zhao Fuxiang	def.	(New Zealand) Joey Baylon	Decision (unanimous)	3	3:00	63 kg 8-Man Tournament Quarterfinals
63 kg	(Russia) Tamerlan Bashirov	def.	(China) Liu Wei	TKO(left hook)	2	1:17	63 kg 8-Man Tournament Quarterfinals
73.5 kg	(China) Sun Weiqiang	def.	(Thailand) Saiyok Pumpanmuang	Decision (unanimous)	3	3:00
67.5 kg	(China) Xie Lei	def.	(Japan) Yuta Kubo	Decision (unanimous)	3	3:00
65 kg	(Thailand) Kaew Weerasakreck	def.	(China) Wang Pengfei	Decision (unanimous)	3	3:00
75 kg	(China) Yi Long	def.	(Suriname) Marco Piqué	Decision (unanimous)	3	3:00
63 kg	(Romania) Adrian Maxim	def.	(China) Jin Ying	Decision (unanimous)	3	3:00	63 kg 8-Man Tournament Semifinals
63 kg	(China) Zhao Fuxiang	def.	(Russia) Tamerlan Bashirov	Decision (unanimous)	3	3:00	63 kg 8-Man Tournament Semifinals
70 kg	(Russia) Shamil Gasanbekov	def.	(Germany) Enriko Kehl	Decision (unanimous)	3	3:00	70 kg Tournament Final
80 kg	(China) Fang Bian	def.	(Germany) Berat Aliu	Decision (unanimous)	3	3:00
93 kg	(Ukraine) Oleg Primachev	def.	(China) Hao Guanghua	KO(knee)	1
63 kg	(Romania) Adrian Maxim	def.	(China) Zhao Fuxiang	TKO (referee stoppage)	1		63 kg 8-Man Tournament finals

=== 2017 WLF World 8 Man Tournament −63 kg bracket ===
Quarter-finals (2017-01-14)
(China) Wang Zhiwei	R3
(Romania) Adrian Maxim	DEC
(China) Jin Ying	DEC
(Colombia) Joan Manuel Lique Cañaveral	R3
(China) Zhao Fuxiang	DEC
(New Zealand) Joey Baylon	R3
(China) Liu Wei	R2
(Russia) Tamerlan Bashirov	TKO

Semi-finals
(Romania) Adrian Maxim	DEC
(China) Jin Ying	R3
(China) Zhao Fuxiang	DEC
(Russia) Tamerlan Bashirov	R3

Final
(Romania) Adrian Maxim	TKO
(China) Zhao Fuxiang	R1

=== 2016 WLF World Championship Tournament −70 kg bracket ===
First round
(China) Hu Yafei	R3
(Belarus) Farkhad Akhmejanau	DEC
(China) Liu Wenlong	DEC
(Spain) Robert Alan	R3
(China) Zhao Yan	R3
(Germany) Enriko Kehl	DEC
(China) Ji Xiang	DEC
(South Korea) Gwan Woo Kim	R3
(Morocco) Nordin Ben moh	TKO
(Thailand) Kongnakun	R1
(China) Wu Jianan	R2
(Russia) Shamil Gasanbekov	TKO
(China) Jiao Fukai	DEC
(Armenia) Arthur	R3
(China) Xiong Ziqiang	TKO
(Netherlands) Hicham Boubkari	R1

Quarter-finals
(Belarus) Farkhad Akhmejanau	DEC
(China) Liu Wenlong	R3
(Germany) Enriko Kehl	TKO
(China) Ji Xiang	R2
(Thailand) Kongnakun (1)	R3
(Russia) Shamil Gasanbekov	DEC
(China) Jiao Fukai	DEC
(China) Xiong Ziqiang	R3

Semi-finals (2017-01-14)
(Belarus) Farkhad Akhmejanau	R3
(Germany) Enriko Kehl	DEC
(Russia) Shamil Gasanbekov	DEC
(China) Jiao Fukai	R3

Final (2017-01-14)
(Germany) Enriko Kehl	R3
(Russia) Shamil Gasanbekov	DEC

(1) Ben Moh injured exit.

== See also ==
- 2017 in Glory
- 2017 in Glory of Heroes
- 2017 in Kunlun Fight
