= Enriko Kehl =

German Muay Thai kickboxer

- Born: February 19, 1992 (age 34); Wetzlar, Hesse, Germany
- Other names: The Hurricane
- Height: 1.77 m (5 ft 9 1/2 in)
- Weight: 70 kg (154 lb; 11 st)
- Division: Featherweight (ONE); Lightweight; Welterweight; Middleweight
- Style: Muay Thai
- Stance: Southpaw
- Fighting out of: Mainz, Germany
- Team: Trans4mers Mainz
- Trainer: Mario Marras, Maikel Polanem, Coach Guido, Coach Seyit
- Years active: 2007–present

Kickboxing record
- Total: 76
- Wins: 55
- By knockout: 32
- Losses: 19
- By knockout: 4
- Draws: 2

Other information
- Occupation: Police officer
- Notable relatives: Juri Kehl (brother)

Enriko Kehl (born February 19, 1992), is a German Muay Thai kickboxer who competes in the Lightweight division of GLORY, he previously competed in the Featherweight division of ONE Championship. He is the 2014 K-1 World Max Championship Tournament Champion. Kehl was voted German Kickboxer of the Year in 2012, 2013 and 2014.

== Career ==
=== Early career ===
After turning professional, Kehl's first prestigious match was in on December 5, 2009, in Bangkok, against Fadi Merza in the quarterfinals of the WMC King's Cup, which he lost. Following this, he fought with another kickboxing veteran, Murat Direkçi, but lost again, on October 10, 2010, in Darmstadt, in Germany.

After some matches, he fought with a great name of the Muay Thai world: Eakpracha Meenayothin, the first great match of his career, from the MAX Muay Thai 1 at Surin, in Thailand, was the March 23, 2013. The fight ended in a draw. After the draw with Eakpracha Meenayothin, at Thailand vs Germany 2013 in Ulm, Germany, he won against Bernueng Topking Boxing.

On June 15, 2013, at MixFight XIV in Darmstadt, he won against Erkan Varol, match that earned him two titles: the MixFight and I.S.K.A. Oriental Rules Supermiddleweight titles.

=== Breakthrough ===
On September 14, 2013, at Mallorca, Spain, The Hurricane arrived in the K-1 World MAX, and won at the final 16 with Henri van Opstal, and advanced to the quarter-final.

After he fought two prestigious matches, against the Muay Thai legend Buakaw Banchamek at MAX Muay Thai 5: The Final Chapter (December 10, 2013), and for the W5 Lightweight European Title against Dzhabar Askerov, at NewFC: Battle of the Stars December 22, 2013. He lost both matches.

At K-1 World Max quarterfinals he won in Gran Canaria with Maximo Suárez, and, advanced at the final 4 fought in Baku, Azerbaijan, also with Shane Campbell. Actually, he is one of the younger K-1 World Max finalists of the tournament's history.

Kehl was initially set to rematch Buakaw Banchamek in the K-1 World MAX 2013 World Championship Tournament Final in Pattaya, Thailand on July 26, 2014. The event was postponed due to the 2014 Thai coup d'état, however. Kehl won a rematch with Buakaw by forfeit in a bout in Pattaya on 12 October 2014.

Kehl will face the Russian Dzhabar Askerov in the Kunlun Fight -70 kg 4 man Tournament in Sochi, Russia on 15 August 2015

=== 2018 ===
Kehl fought Yodsanklai Fairtex on February 4, 2018, at Kunlun Fight 69 in Guiyang, China and lost by decision.

=== ONE Championship ===
On January 9, 2019, it was reported that Kehl had signed with the Singapore-based promotion ONE Championship.

On March 8, 2019, he made his promotional debut at ONE Championship: Reign of Valor, defeating Liam Nolan by second-round TKO.

Kehl was entered into the 2019 ONE Featherweight Kickboxing World Grand Prix, which featured names like Giorgio Petrosyan and Yodsanklai Fairtex. On May 17, 2019, he lost to Dzhabar Askerov in the Grand Prix Quarter-final by unanimous decision at ONE Championship: Enter the Dragon.

On November 16, 2019, Kehl defeated Armen Petrosyan by second-round TKO at ONE Championship: Age Of Dragons.

Kehl faced promotional newcomer Chingiz Allazov at ONE on TNT 1 on April 7, 2021. He won a close bout via split decision.

Kehl faced Davit Kiria in the quarter-finals of the 2021 ONE Kickboxing Featherweight Grand Prix at ONE Championship: First Strike on October 15, 2021. He lost the fight by first-round TKO.

Kehl faced Tayfun Özcan at ONE: Full Circle on February 25, 2022. He lost the bout via unanimous decision.

=== GLORY Kickboxing ===
On January 23, 2023, Kehl announced that he has signed a multi-year contract with GLORY. Kehl faced Guerric Billet in a lightweight title eliminator at Glory 86 on May 27, 2023. He won the fight by unanimous decision.

Kehl challenged the Glory Lightweight champion Tyjani Beztati at Glory Heavyweight Grand Prix on March 9, 2024. He lost the fight by unanimous decision.

== Titles and accomplishments ==
=== Professional ===
- International Fight Promotion
  - 2026 IFP World Super Lightweight (-72.5 kg) Champion
- Wu Lin Feng
  - 2016 Wu Lin Feng World 70 kg Group C 4MAN-Tournament
- World Karate and Kickboxing Union
  - 2014 W.K.U. Thaiboxing Rules World Championship -70 kg
- K-1
  - 2014 K-1 Global K-1 World Max Championship Tournament Champion -70 kg
- Mix Fight Championship
  - 2013 MixFight Full Muay Thai Middleweight World Title -72,5 kg
- International Sport Karate Association
  - 2013 I.S.K.A. Oriental Rules Middleweight World Champion -75 kg
- Muay Thai Bund Deutschland (Muay Thai Federation of Germany)
  - 2012 M.T.B.D. Muay Thai Middleweight German Champion -75 kg

=== Amateur ===
- International Federation of Muaythai Associations
  - 2012 I.F.M.A. EuropaCup Muaythai Champion in Dresden, Germany -75 kg
  - 2011 I.F.M.A. European Championships in Antalya, Turkey (bronze) -71 kg

=== Awards ===
- 2014 GroundAndPound National Kickboxer of the Year.
- 2013 GroundAndPound National Kickboxer of the Year.
- 2013 AllTheBestFights.Com Best Knockouts of the Year vs. Bernueng Topking Boxing on March 23
- 2012 GroundAndPound National Kickboxer of the Year.

== Fight record ==
Muay Thai Record
55 Wins (32 (T)KO's), 19 Losses, 2 Draws
Date	Result	Opponent	Event	Location	Method	Round	Time
2026-05-23	Win	(China) Ji Lonteng	IFP Fight Series #5	Essen, Germany	TKO (Low kicks)	4	
Wins the inaugural IFP World Super Lightweight (-72.5kg) title
2025-11-24	Loss	(Japan) Kaito	SHOOT BOXING 40th Anniversary	Tokyo, Japan	Decision (Unanimous)	3	3:00
2025-06-22	Win	(Japan) Kaito	Shoot Boxing 2025 act.3	Tokyo, Japan	Decision (Unanimous)	3	3:00
2024-03-09	Loss	(Morocco) Tyjani Beztati	Glory Heavyweight Grand Prix	Arnhem, Netherlands	Decision (Unanimous)	5	3:00
For the Glory Lightweight Championship
2023-12-23	Win	(Belgium) Arman Hambaryan	Glory 90	Rotterdam, Netherlands	TKO (Rib injury)	3	0:20
2023-05-27	Win	(France) Guerric Billet	Glory 86	Essen, Germany	Decision (Unanimous)	3	3:00
Glory Lightweight title eliminator.
2022-02-25	Loss	(Turkey) Tayfun Özcan	ONE: Full Circle	Kallang, Singapore	Decision (Unanimous)	3	3:00
2021-10-15	Loss	(Georgia (country)) Davit Kiria	ONE Championship: First Strike	Kallang, Singapore	TKO (3 Knockdown/Punches)	1	2:50
Kickboxing Featherweight Grand Prix Quarter-final
2021-04-07	Win	(Azerbaijan) Chingiz Allazov	ONE on TNT	Kallang, Singapore	Decision (Split)	3	3:00
2019-12-07	Win	(Croatia) Andrej Kedveš	Mix Fight Championship 27	Frankfurt, Germany	Decision (Unanimous)	3	3:00
2019-11-16	Win	(Armenia) Armen Petrosyan	ONE Championship: Age Of Dragons	Beijing, China	TKO (Knees + Punches)	2	1:55
2019-05-17	Loss	(Russia) Dzhabar Askerov	ONE Championship: Enter the Dragon	Kallang, Singapore	Decision (Unanimous)	3	3:00
Kickboxing Featherweight Grand-Prix Quarter-Finals
2019-03-08	Win	(England) Liam Nolan	ONE Championship 92: Reign of Valor	Yangon, Myanmar	TKO (Left knee to the body)	2	
2018-12-01	Win	(Denmark) Mohammed El Mir	Mix Fight Gala 25	Germany	KO (Punches)	2	
2018-10-27	Win	(England) Jordan Watson	Enfusion Live	Germany	Decision (Unanimous)	3	3:00
2018-02-03	Loss	(Thailand) Yodsanklai Fairtex	Wu Lin Feng 2018: World Championship in Shenzhen	Shenzhen, China	Decision (unanimous)	3	3:00
2017-12-02	Win	(Russia) Arbi Emiev	Mix Fight Gala 23	Frankfurt, Germany	Decision (Unanimous)	3	3:00
2017-09-02	Loss	(Thailand) Sitthichai Sitsongpeenong	Wu Lin Feng – Yi Long challenge Tournament Semi-finals	Zhengzhou, China	Decision (unanimous)	3	3:00
2017-06-03	Win	(Brazil) Ravy Brunow	Wu Lin Feng: China vs. Japan	Changsha, China	Decision (unanimous)	3	3:00
2017-04-08	Loss	(Morocco) Mustapha Haida	Bellator Kickboxing 5	Turin, Italy	Decision (split)	3	3:00
2017-01-14	Loss	(Russia) Shamil Gasanbekov	Wu Lin Feng 2016 World Kickboxing Championship, Final	Zhengzhou, China	Decision (unanimous)	3	3:00
Fight was for WLF World 70kg Tournament
2017-01-14	Win	(Belarus) Farkhad Akhmedjanov	Wu Lin Feng 2016 World Kickboxing Championship, Semi-finals	Zhengzhou, China	Decision (unanimous)	3	3:00
2016-12-03	Win	(China) Song Shaoqiu	Mix Fight Gala 20	Frankfurt, Germany	Decision (unanimous)	3	3:00
2016-09-03	Win	(China) Ji Xiang	Wu Lin Feng World Championship 2016 – 70 kg Tournament, Quarter-finals	Zhengzhou, China	TKO	2	
Wins WLF World 70kg Group C 4MAN-Tournament
2016-09-03	Win	(China) Zhao Yan	Wu Lin Feng World Championship 2016 – 70 kg Tournament Final 16	Zhengzhou, China	Decision (unanimous)	3	3:00
2016-06-24	Loss	(Azerbaijan) Chingiz Allazov	Monte-Carlo Fighting Masters	Monte-Carlo, Monaco	KO (Right hook)	5	2:58
Fight Was For WAKO Pro K-1 World -70 kg title.
2016-05-07	Win	(China) Jiao Fukai	Glory of Heroes 2	Shenzhen, China	TKO	2	
2016-04-02	Loss	(China) Yi Long	Glory of Heroes 1	Shenzhen, China	Unanimous Decision	3	3:00
2015-12-05	Win	(China) Hu Yafei	Mix Fight Gala	Frankfurt, Germany	Decision (unanimous)	3	3:00
2015-11-07	Win	(China) Zhao Chunyang	Wu Lin Feng 2015	Shenyang, China	Decision	3	3:00
2015-08-15	Loss	(Russia) Dzhabar Askerov	Kunlun Fight 29 – Middleweight Tournament, Semi-finals	Sochi, Russia	KO (right hook)	2	2:19
2015-05-15	Win	(France) Mohamed Diaby	Kunlun Fight 25	Banská Bystrica, Slovakia	Decision(Extra round)	4	3:00
2015-04-11	Loss	(Italy) Giorgio Petrosyan	Oktagon 2015: 20 years edition	Milan, Italy	Decision (majority)	3	3:00
2015-02-28	Win	(Turkey) Erkan Varol	Akın Dövüş Arenası	Istanbul, Turkey	Decision	3	3:00
2014-11-22	Win	(France) Abdoul Touré	Mix Fight Gala XVII	Hanau, Germany	KO	2	
Wins W.K.U. Thaiboxing Rules World Championship -70 kg.
2014-10-12	Win	(Thailand) Buakaw Banchamek	K-1 World MAX 2014 World Championship Tournament Final	Pattaya, Thailand	Forfeit	4	0:00
Wins K-1 World MAX 2014 World Championship Tournament title.
2014-04-26	Win	(England) Chad Sugden	Mix Fight Gala XV	Darmstadt, Germany	Decision	3	3:00
2014-02-23	Win	(Canada) Shane Campbell	K-1 World MAX 2013 World Championship Tournament Final 4	Baku, Azerbaijan	Decision	3	3:00
2014-01-11	Win	(Spain) Maximo Suárez	K-1 World MAX World Championship Tournament Quarter-final in Gran Canaria	Gran Canaria, Spain	Decision	3	3:00
2013-12-22	Loss	(Russia) Dzhabar Askerov	NewFC: Battle of the Stars	Makhachkala, Russia	Decision	4	3:00
For the W5 Lightweight European Champion Title -71 Kg
2013-12-10	Loss	(Thailand) Buakaw Banchamek	MAX Muay Thai 5: The Final Chapter	Khon Kaen, Thailand	Decision	3	3:00
2013-10-20	Win	(Russia) Magomed Magomedov	Tatneft Cup 2012 Final	Kazan, Russia	Decision	4	3:00
2013-09-14	Win	(Netherlands) Henri van Opstal	K-1 World MAX 2013 World Championship Tournament Final 16	Mallorca, Spain	Unanimous decision	3	3:00
2013-06-15	Win	(Turkey) Erkan Varol	Mix Fight Gala XIV	Darmstadt, Germany	Decision (unanimous)	5	3:00
Win 2013 MixFight and I.S.K.A. Oriental Rules Middleweight World Champion -75 Kg
2013-05-06	Win	(Thailand) Berneung Topkingboxing	Thailand vs Europe 2013	Ulm, Germany	KO (Spinning Elbow)	4	
2013-03-23	Draw	(Thailand) Aikpracha Meenayothin	MAX Muay Thai 1	Surin, Thailand	Draw	3	3:00
2012-05-05	Win	(Thailand) Nonsai Sor.Sanyakorn	Thailand vs Germany 2012	Heidenheim an der Brenz, Germany	KO (spinning back elbow)	3	2:20
2012-09-01	Win	(Morocco) Mohammed Medhar	Mix Fight Gala XIII	Frankfurt, Germany	KO (knee injury)	2	0:54
2012-05-05	Loss	(Germany) Alex Vogel	La Familia Fight Night III	Halle, Germany	DQ (Groin Kick)	e	0:15
2011-11-06	Loss	(Thailand) Jaochalarm Chatkranok	Thailand vs Germany 2011	Ulm, Germany	Split decision	5	3:00
2011-12-04	Win	(Germany)	WMC King's Cup 2011 Quarterfinal	Bangkok, Thailand	TKO	2	0:35
2010-10-10	Loss	(Turkey) Murat Direkçi	Mix Fight Gala 10	Darmstadt, Germany	TKO (left hook)	1	2:37
2009-12-05	Loss	(Syria) Fadi Merza	King's Cup, Quarter-final	Bangkok, Thailand	Decision	3	3:00
Legend: Win Loss Draw/No contest Notes

== See also ==
- List of K-1 events
- List of male kickboxers
