= Li Mingrui =

Chinese kickboxer

- Born: 李明蕊; April 9, 1998 (age 28); China
- Nickname: Miracle Girl
- Height: 159 cm (5 ft 3 in)
- Weight: 53 kg (117 lb; 8 st 5 lb)
- Style: Sanda, Kickboxing
- Stance: Orthodox
- Fighting out of: Zhengzhou, China
- Team: Shunyan Fight Club
- Trainer: Ren Kailin

Kickboxing record
- Total: 35
- Wins: 27
- By knockout: 2
- Losses: 8
- By knockout: 1
- Draws: 0

Li Mingrui (born April 9, 1998) is a Chinese kickboxer.

As of April 2023, she ranked the #9 pound-for-pound women kickboxer in the world by Beyond Kickboxing.

== Career ==
Li debuted martial arts with Sanda at the age of 14 and transitioned to kickboxing in 2013 when she joined the Shunyan Fight Club under the guidance of her coach Ren Kailin.

For her first international matchup in the professionals Li was scheduled to face the reigning WPMF world champion Yui Takada at Peng Cheng Fight. She won by unanimous decision after scoring a knockdown.

On September 28, 2015, Li travelled to Bangkok, Thailand to take part in the first round of a tournament at Kunlun Fight 31. She was defeated by decision against Isis Verbeek.

Li faced Gloria Peritore at Bellator Kickboxing 1 on April 16, 2016. She lost the fight by a third-round technical knockout.

On April 19, 2018, Li travelled to Czech Republic to face Sandra Maskova at Wu Lin Feng 2018: Czech Republic VS China. She won the fight by decision.

Li defeated Irina Mazepa by decision at Wu Lin Feng 2018: Yi Long VS Saiyok on June 2, 2018. She suffered an eye injury during the bout.

On September 18, 2018, Li entered the Legend of Mulan 8-women tournament on short notice at Kunlun Fight 76. In the quarterfinals she was knocked out by Nili Block with a high kick in the first round. After this loss Li won her five next fights all on Wu Lin Feng, defeating Claudia Diaz, Taylor McClatchie, Astrid Johanna Grents, Souris Manfredi and Alicia Pestana all by decision before being matched with Marina Spasic at Wu Lin Feng 2019: WLF -67kg World Cup 2019-2020 4th Group Stage on September 28, 2019. She won the fight by decision.

Li's winning streak in Wu Lin Feng was pushed to thirteen in a row when she was scheduled to face the reigning ISKA World Oriental rules Super Featherweight champion Lara Fernandez on January 11, 2020, at WLF World Cup 2019-2020 Final. She lost by unanimous decision.

On April 24, 2022, Li entered a 4-women tournament for the inaugural Wu Lin Feng China women's 56 kg championship. In the semifinals she defeated Wu Yi by unanimous decision and avadanced to the final where she defeated Zhang Meng by unanimous decision to capture the first belt of her professional career.

Li faced Ella Maria Grapperhaus at Wu Lin Feng 535: China vs Netherlands on March 18, 2023. She won the fight by unanimous decision.

== Championships and accomplishments ==
- Wu Lin Feng
  - 2021 Wu Lin Feng China -56 kg Championship

== Fight record ==
Professional Muay Thai & Kickboxing record
28 wins (3 (T)KOs), 8 losses, 0 draw
Date	Result	Opponent	Event	Location	Method	Round	Time
2025-11-07	Loss	(Myanmar) Vero Nika	ONE Friday Fights 132, Lumpinee Stadium	Bangkok, Thailand	Decision (Split)	3	3:00
2024-02-03	Win	(Iran) Vish	Wu Lin Feng 20th Year Anniversary	Zhengzhou, China	Decision	3	3:00
2023-03-18	Win	(Netherlands) Ella Maria Grapperhaus	Wu Lin Feng 535: China vs Netherlands	Tangshan, China	Decision (Unanimous)	3	3:00
2022-03-26	Win	(China) Qiu Lian	Wu Lin Feng 528	Zhengzhou, China	KO (Left hook)	1	2:21
2021-04-24	Win	(China) Zhang Meng	Wu Lin Feng 2021: World Contender League 2nd Stage, Final	Zhengzhou, China	Decision (Unanimous)	3	3:00
Wins the inaugural Wu Lin Feng China -56kg Championship.
2021-04-24	Win	(China) Wu Yi	Wu Lin Feng 2021: World Contender League 2nd Stage, Semi Final	Zhengzhou, China	Decision (Unanimous)	3	3:00
2020-11-14	Win	(China) Zhang Meng	Wu Lin Feng 2020: China 60kg & 63kg Championship Tournament	Zhengzhou, China	Decision	3	3:00
2020-07-05	Win	(China) Wu Yi	Wu Lin Feng 2020: King's Super Cup Group Stage	Zhengzhou, China	KO (Body punches)	2	3:00
2020-01-11	Loss	(Spain) Lara Fernandez	Wu Lin Feng World Cup 2019-2020 Final	Zhuhai, China	Decision (Unanimous)	3	3:00
2019-11-30	Win	(Germany) Farida Okiko	Wu Lin Feng -67kg World Cup 2019-2020 6th Group Stage	Zhengzhou, China	Decision (Unanimous)	3	3:00
2019-09-28	Win	(Serbia) Marina Spasic	Wu Lin Feng -67kg World Cup 2019-2020 4th Group Stage	Zhengzhou, China	Decision	3	3:00
2019-07-27	Win	(Spain) Claudia Diaz	Wu Lin Feng -67kg World Cup 2019-2020 2nd Group Stage	Zhengzhou, China	Decision (Unanimous)	3	3:00
2019-05-25	Win	(Canada) Taylor McClatchie	Wu Lin Feng 2019: China vs Canada	Zhengzhou, China	Decision (Unanimous)	3	3:00
2019-04-13	Win	(Estonia) Astrid Johanna Grents	Wu Lin Feng 2019: WLF China vs Estonia	Tallinn, Estonia	Decision	3	3:00
2018-12-01	Win	(France) Souris Manfredi	Wu Lin Feng World Cup 2018-2019	Zhengzhou, China	Decision (Unanimous)	3	3:00
2018-11-04	Win	(Australia) Alicia Pestana	Wu Lin Feng 2018: China vs Australia	Melbourne, Australia	Decision (Unanimous)	3	3:00
2018-09-09	Loss	(Israel) Nili Block	Kunlun Fight 76 - Legend of Mulan Tournament Quarterfinal	Zhangqiu, China	KO (High kick)	1	
2018-09-01	Win	(Australia) Yolanda Schmidt	Wu Lin Feng -67kg World Cup 2018-2019 3rd Round	Zhengzhou, China	Decision	3	3:00
2018-08-04	Win	(Spain) Claudia Diaz	Wu Lin Feng -67kg World Cup 2018-2019 2nd Round	Zhengzhou, China	Decision	3	3:00
2018-06-02	Win	(Russia) Irina Mazepa	Wu Lin Feng 2018: Yi Long VS Saiyok	Chongqing, China	Decision	3	3:00
2018-04-19	Win	(Czech Republic) Sandra Maskova	Wu Lin Feng 2018: Czech Republic VS China	Prague, Czech Republic	Decision	3	3:00
2018-02-03	Win	(Netherlands) Ilsury Hendrikse	Wu Lin Feng 2018: World Championship in Shenzhen	Shenzhen, China	Decision	3	3:00
2017-09-30	Win	(France) Helene	Yunfeng Battle	Laizhou, China	TKO (Punches)	1	1:37
2017-08-26	Win	(Ukraine) Victoria	Yunfeng Battle	Laizhou, China	Decision	3	3:00
2017-07-15	Loss	(Russia) Dilshoda Umarova	ACB KB 10: Russia vs. China	Moscow, Russia	Decision (Unanimous)	3	3:00
2017-04-15	Loss	(Thailand) Pettape Krungtep	Wu Lin Feng 2017: Thailand VS China	Bangkok, Thailand	Decision	3	3:00
2017-03-04	Win	(Netherlands) Samantha Van Doorn	Wu Lin Feng 2017: Kung Fu VS Muay Thai	Zhengzhou, China	Decision (Unanimous)	3	3:00
2016-04-16	Loss	(Italy) Gloria Peritore	Bellator Kickboxing 1	Torino, Italy	TKO (Punches)	3	
2016-01-13	Win	(Russia) Natalia Diachkova	Wu Lin Feng E.P.I.C. 1	Zhengzhou, China	Decision	3	3:00
2015-09-28	Loss	(Netherlands) Isis Verbeek	Kunlun Fight 31, Tournament Quarterfinal	Bangkok, Thailand	Decision (Unanimous)	3	3:00
2015-09-19	Loss	(New Zealand) Michelle Preston	Wu Lin Feng 2015 : China vs New Zealand	Auckland, New Zealand	Decision	3	3:00
2014- 09-21	Win	(Japan) Yui Takada	Peng Cheng Fight	Shenzhen, China	Decision	3	3:00
Legend: Win Loss Draw/No contest Notes

== See also ==
- List of female kickboxers
