= 2018 in Wu Lin Feng =

Chinese kickboxing events

Information
- First date: February 3
- Last date: N/A

Events
- Total events: N/A

Fights

Chronology
| 2017 in Wu Lin Feng | 2018 in Wu Lin Feng | 2019 in Wu Lin Feng |

The year 2018 is the 15th year in the history of the Wu Lin Feng, a Chinese kickboxing promotion.

== List of events ==
| No. | Event | Date | Venue | City |
|---|---|---|---|---|
| 22 | Wu Lin Feng 2018: WLF x S1 - China vs Thailand | December 08, 2018 | | Thailand |
| 21 | Wu Lin Feng 2018: WLF -67kg World Cup 2018-2019 6th Round | December 01, 2018 | | Zhengzhou, China |
| 20 | Wu Lin Feng 2018: WLF x KF1 | November 07, 2018 | | Hong Kong |
| 19 | Wu Lin Feng 2018: China vs Australia | November 04, 2018 | Melbourne Convention Exhibition Center | Melbourne, Australia |
| 18 | Wu Lin Feng 2018: WLF -67kg World Cup 2018-2019 5th Round | November 03, 2018 | | China |
| 17 | Wu Lin Feng 2018: China vs Canada | October 14, 2018 | Pan Am Sports Center | Markham, Ontario, Canada |
| 16 | Wu Lin Feng 2018: WLF -67kg World Cup 2018-2019 4th Round | October 06, 2018 | | Shangqiu, China |
| 15 | Wu Lin Feng 2018: WLF -67kg World Cup 2018-2019 3rd Round | September 01, 2018 | | Zhengzhou, China |
| 14 | Wu Lin Feng 2018: WLF x OSS Fighters - China vs Romania | August 24, 2018 | Piateta Cazino | Mamaia, Romania |
| 13 | Wu Lin Feng 2018: WLF -67kg World Cup 2018-2019 2nd Round | August 04, 2018 | | Zhengzhou, China |
| 12 | Wu Lin Feng 2018: WLF x Krush 90 - China vs Japan | July 22, 2018 | Korakuen Hall | Tokyo, Japan |
| 11 | Wu Lin Feng 2018: WLF -67kg World Cup 2018-2019 1st Round | July 07, 2018 | Henan Provincial Stadium | Zhengzhou, China |
| 10 | Wu Lin Feng 2018: China vs Netherlands & Russia | June 16, 2018 | Shenyang Olympic Sports Center Stadium | Shenyang, China |
| 09 | Wu Lin Feng 2018: Yi Long VS Saiyok | June 02, 2018 | Zhongxian Three Gorges harbour | Chongqing, China |
| 08 | Wu Lin Feng 2018: World Championship Yichun | May 19, 2018 | Yichun Mingyue Mountain eco Garden | Yichun, Jiangxi, China |
| 07 | Wu Lin Feng 2018: World Championship Nanyang | May 05, 2018 | Nanyang Sports Center | Nanyang, Henan, China |
| 06 | Wu Lin Feng 2018: Czech Republic VS China | April 19, 2018 | Sportovni Hala Kralovka | Prague, Czech Republic |
| 05 | Wu Lin Feng 2018: World Championship Shijiazhuang | April 07, 2018 | Hebei Gymnasium | Shijiazhuang, Hebei, China |
| 04 | Wu Lin Feng 2018: Greece VS China - Gods of War 11 | March 24, 2018 | Dais Sports Center Marousi | Athens, Greece |
| 03 | Wu Lin Feng 2018: -60kg World Championship Tournament | March 10, 2018 | Chenjiagou Wangting Hotel | Jiaozuo, Henan, China |
| 02 | Wu Lin Feng 2018: World Championship Tianjin | March 3, 2018 | Wuqing Sports Center | Tianjin, China |
| 01 | Wu Lin Feng 2018: World Championship in Shenzhen | February 3, 2018 | Luohu Gymnasium | Shenzhen, Guangdong, China |

== Wu Lin Feng 2018: World Championship in Shenzhen ==
Wu Lin Feng 2018: World Championship in Shenzhen
- Promotion: Wu Lin Feng
- Date: February 03, 2018
- City: Shenzhen, Guangdong, China

Wu Lin Feng 2018: World Championship in Shenzhen was a kickboxing event held on February 3, 2018 in Shenzhen, Guangdong, China.

=== Results ===
Main Card
| Weight Class | | | | Method | Round | Time | Notes |
|---|---|---|---|---|---|---|---|
| Kickboxing -66kg | (China) Wang Pengfei | def. | (Netherlands) Juan Javier Barragan | KO | 2 |
| Kickboxing -67kg | (China) Yang Zhuo | def. | (Papua New Guinea) Jonathan Tuhu | Decision (Unanimous) | 3 | 3:00 |
| Kickboxing -71kg | (Thailand) Yodsanklai Fairtex | def. | (Germany) Enriko Kehl | Decision (Unanimous) | 3 | 3:00 |
| Kickboxing -67kg | (Thailand) Singdam Kiatmuu9 | def. | (China) Xie Lei | Ext.R Decision (Unanimous) | 4 | 3:00 |
| Kickboxing -63kg | (Belgium) Nafi Bilalovski | def. | (China) Jin Ying | Decision | 3 | 3:00 |
| Kickboxing Women -54kg | (China) Gong Yanli | def. | (Netherlands) Daisy Emilie | Decision (Unanimous) | 3 | 3:00 |
| Kickboxing -90kg | (China) Hao Guanghua | def. | (Croatia) Petar Jaman | KO (Knee to the Body) | 1 |
| Kickboxing -60kg | (Japan) Hirotaka Asahisa | def. | (China) Li Ning | Decision (Unanimous) | 3 | 3:00 |
| Kickboxing -65kg | (China) Meng Guodong | def. | (Croatia) Andrej Kedves | TKO (Punches) | 2 |
| Kickboxing -70kg | (China) Song Shaoqiu | vs. | (Netherlands) Anouar Lamhaj |
| Kickboxing Women -55kg | (China) Li Mingrui | def. | (Netherlands) Ilsury Hendrikse | Decision | 3 | 3:00 |
| Kickboxing -60kg | (China) Zhao Chongyang | def. | (Thailand) Arannchai Kiatpatarapran | Decision | 3 | 3:00 |
| Kickboxing -58kg | (China) Xue Shenzhen | def. | (Netherlands) Jano Dimangio | Decision | 3 | 3:00 |

== Wu Lin Feng 2018: World Championship Tianjin ==
Wu Lin Feng 2018: World Championship Tianjin
- Promotion: Wu Lin Feng
- Date: March 03, 2018
- Venue: Wuqing Sports Center
- City: Tianjin, China

Wu Lin Feng 2018: World Championship Tianjin was a kickboxing event held on February 3, 2018 in Tianjin, China.

=== Results ===
Main Card
| Weight Class | | | | Method | Round | Time | Notes |
|---|---|---|---|---|---|---|---|
| Kickboxing -67kg | (Turkey) Hasan Toy | def. | (Morocco) Ilias Bulaid | Decision (Split) | 3 | 3:00 | WLF -67kg Contender Tournament Final |
| Kickboxing -80kg | (China) Fu Gaofeng | def. | (Netherlands) Darryl Sichtman | KO (Left Hook) | 1 |
| Kickboxing -77kg | (Netherlands) Regian Eersel | def. | (Russia) Jamal Yusupov | Decision | 3 | 3:00 |
| Kickboxing -63kg | (Germany) Dennis Wosik | def. | (China) Jin Ying | Decision | 3 | 3:00 |
| Kickboxing -67kg | (Turkey) Hasan Toy | def. | (China) Feng Jie | Decision (Unanimous) | 3 | 3:00 | WLF -67kg Contender Tournament Semi Final |
| Kickboxing -67kg | (Morocco) Ilias Bulaid | def. | (China) Xie Lei | Decision (Unanimous) | 3 | 3:00 | WLF -67kg Contender Tournament Semi Final |
| Kickboxing -65kg | (China) Lei Penghui | def. | (Germany) Kevin Eiberg | Decision | 3 | 3:00 |
| Kickboxing -64kg | (China) Wang Zhiwei | def. | (Japan) Hisaki Higashimoto | KO (Punches) | 1 |
| Kickboxing -70kg | (Japan) Hiromi Wajima | def. | (China) Wang Chao | KO (Left Cross) | 2 |
| Kickboxing -70kg | (Romania) Alex Bublea | vs. | (China) Liu Guicheng |
| Kickboxing -63kg | (China) Liu Qiliang | def. | (Netherlands) Jan Kaffa |
| Kickboxing -63kg | (United States) Arthur Sorsor | def. | (China) Zheng Bo | Decision | 3 | 3:00 |

== Wu Lin Feng 2018: -60kg World Championship Tournament ==
Wu Lin Feng 2018: -60kg World Championship Tournament
- Promotion: Wu Lin Feng
- Date: March 10, 2018
- Venue: Chenjiagou Wangting Hotel
- City: Jiaozuo, Henan, China

Wu Lin Feng 2018: -60kg World Championship Tournament was a kickboxing event held on March 10, 2018 in Jiaozuo, Henan, China.

=== Results ===
Main Card
| Weight Class | | | | Method | Round | Time | Notes |
|---|---|---|---|---|---|---|---|
| Kickboxing -60kg | (Japan) Hirotaka Asahisa | def. | (China) Zhao Chongyang | Ext.R KO (Flying Knee) | 4 | | WLF -60kg Championship Tournament Final |
| Kickboxing -60kg | (China) Li Ning | vs. | (Thailand) Dechsakda Sitsongpeenong |
| Kickboxing -90kg | (Spain) Lorenzo Javier Jorge | def. | (China) Hao Guanghua | Decision (Unanimous) | 3 | 3:00 |
| Kickboxing -75kg | (Netherlands) Marco Pique | vs. | (China) Sun Weiqiang |
| Kickboxing -70kg | (Morocco) Marouan Toutouh | def. | (Russia) Jamal Yusupov | Decision | 3 | 3:00 |
| Kickboxing -60kg | (China) Zhao Chongyang | def. | (Spain) Javier Hernanadez | TKO (Forfeit) | 1 | | WLF -60kg Championship Tournament Semi Final |
| Kickboxing -60kg | (Japan) Hirotaka Asahisa | def. | (France) Djany Fiorenti | Decision | 3 | 3:00 | WLF -60kg Championship Tournament Semi Final |
| Kickboxing Women -57kg | (China) Li Mingrui | vs. | (Netherlands) Naomi Tataroglu |
| Kickboxing -60kg | (China) Wang Wenben | def. | (Japan) Taio Asahisa | Decision | 3 | 3:00 | WLF -60kg Championship Tournament Reserve Fight |
| Kickboxing -60kg | (China) Zhao Chongyang | def. | (Thailand) Tanjao Sitsongpeenong | KO (Punches) | 1 | | WLF -60kg Championship Tournament Quarter Final |
| Kickboxing -60kg | (Spain) Javier Hernanadez | def. | (China) Wang Junyu | Ext.R Decision (Unanimous) | 4 | 3:00 | WLF -60kg Championship Tournament Quarter Final |
| Kickboxing -60kg | (France) Djany Fiorenti | def. | (China) Zhu Shuai | Decision | 3 | 3:00 | WLF -60kg Championship Tournament Quarter Final |
| Kickboxing -60kg | (Japan) Hirotaka Asahisa | def. | (China) Chen Wende | KO (Punches) | 1 | | WLF -60kg Championship Tournament Quarter Final |

== Wu Lin Feng 2018: Greece VS China - Gods of War 11 ==
Wu Lin Feng 2018: Greece VS China - Gods of War 11
- Promotion: Wu Lin Feng; Gods of War
- Date: March 24, 2018
- Venue: Dais Sports Center Marousi
- City: Athens, Greece

Wu Lin Feng 2018: Greece VS China - Gods of War 11 was a kickboxing event held on March 24, 2018 in Athens, Greece.

=== Results ===
Main Card
| Weight Class | | | | Method | Round | Time | Notes |
|---|---|---|---|---|---|---|---|
| Kickboxing -66kg | (China) Wang Pengfei | def. | (Greece) Sokratis Kerpatsi | KO (High Kick) | 3 |
| Kickboxing -70kg | (Greece) Nikkos Gkikas | def. | (China) Zhao Yan | Decision | 3 | 3:00 |
| Kickboxing -82kg | (Greece) Emmanuel Diakam | def. | (China) Wang Zighuo | Decision | 3 | 3:00 |
| Kickboxing -69kg | (Greece) Christos Kitsos | def. | (China) Zhang Ren | Decision | 3 | 3:00 |
| Kickboxing -71kg | (Greece) Giannis Boukis | def. | (China) Song Shaoqiu | Decision | 3 | 3:00 | WLF -71kg Intercontinental title |
| Kickboxing -80kg | (Greece) Antonis Armenatzoglou | def. | (China) Duoli Chen | Decision | 3 | 3:00 |
| Kickboxing | (Greece) Lucjano Ruci | def. | (China) Liu Qiliang | Ext.R Decision | 4 | 3:00 |
| Kickboxing -69kg | (Greece) Dyonisis Gkikas | def. | (China) Wu Jianan | Decision (Unanimous) | 3 | 3:00 |
| Kickboxing -61kg | (China) Xue Shenzhen | def. | (Greece) Olisian Mesutai | Decision (Unanimous) | 3 | 3:00 |
| Kickboxing Women -54kg | (China) Huang Shiqing | def. | (Greece) Desponia Kamperi | Decision | 3 | 3:00 |

== Wu Lin Feng 2018: World Championship Shijiazhuang ==
Wu Lin Feng 2018: World Championship Shijiazhuang
- Promotion: Wu Lin Feng
- Date: April 07, 2018
- Venue: Hebei Gymnasium
- City: Shijiazhuang, Hebei, China

Wu Lin Feng 2018: World Championship Shijiazhuang was a kickboxing event held on April 07, 2018 in Shijiazhuang, Hebei, China.

=== Results ===
Main Card
| Weight Class | | | | Method | Round | Time | Notes |
|---|---|---|---|---|---|---|---|
| Kickboxing -63kg | (Romania) Adrian Maxim | def. | (China) Wang Pengfei | Ext.R Decision | 4 | 3:00 |
| Kickboxing -65kg | (Spain) Khyzer Hayat | def. | (China) Liu Xiangming | Decision | 3 | 3:00 |
| Kickboxing -67kg | (China) Yang Zhuo | def. | (Romania) Alex Bublea | Decision (Unanimous) | 3 | 3:00 |
| Kickboxing Women | (China) Wang Cong | def. | (France) Marion Montanari | Decision | 3 | 3:00 |
| Kickboxing -72kg | (Netherlands) Nordin Van Roosmalen | def. | (China) Xu Zhenguang | Decision | 3 | 3:00 |
| Kickboxing -63kg | (China) Wang Zhiwei | def. | (Spain) Sergio Cabezas | Decision | 3 | 3:00 |
| Kickboxing -70kg | (China) Meng Qinghao | def. | (Spain) Antonio Gomez | Decision | 3 | 3:00 |
| Kickboxing -63kg | (China) Jin Ying | def. | (United States) Arthur Sorsor | Decision | 3 | 3:00 |

== Wu Lin Feng 2018: Czech Republic VS China ==
Wu Lin Feng 2018: Czech Republic VS China
- Promotion: Wu Lin Feng
- Date: April 19, 2018
- Venue: Sportovni Hala Kralovka
- City: Prague, Czech Republic

Wu Lin Feng 2018: Czech Republic VS China was a kickboxing event held on April 19, 2018 in Prague, Czech Republic.

=== Results ===
Main Card
| Weight Class | | | | Method | Round | Time | Notes |
|---|---|---|---|---|---|---|---|
| Kickboxing -91kg | (China) Hao Guanghua | def. | (Czech Republic) Jan Soukup | Decision (Unanimous) | 3 | 3:00 |
| Kickboxing -88kg | (Czech Republic) Jiri Zak | def. | (China) Zhou Wei | Decision | 3 | 3:00 |
| Kickboxing +95kg | (Czech Republic) Lubos Rauser | vs. | Michal Reisseinger |
| Kickboxing -75kg | (Czech Republic) Anatoli Hunayan | def. | (China) Li Hui | Decision | 3 | 3:00 |
| Kickboxing +71kg | (Czech Republic) Jan Rudolf | def. | (China) Li Zikai | Decision | 3 | 3:00 |
| Kickboxing Women -54kg | (Czech Republic) Mochaela Kerlehova | def. | (China) Huang Shiqing | Decision | 3 | 3:00 |
| Kickboxing -63.5kg | (Czech Republic) Václav Sivák | def. | (China) Fang Feida | Decision | 3 | 3:00 |
| Kickboxing -71kg | (Czech Republic) Tadeas Ruzicka | def. | (China) Song Shaoqiu | Decision | 3 | 3:00 |
| Kickboxing Women -56kg | (China) Li Mingrui | def. | (Czech Republic) Sandra Maskova | Decision | 3 | 3:00 |
| Kickboxing -63kg | (Czech Republic) Jan Holec | def. | (China) Zheng Ke | Decision | 3 | 3:00 | WAKO PRO International -63kg title |
| Kickboxing -67kg | (Czech Republic) Jakub Krofta | def. | (China) Liu Yong | Decision | 3 | 3:00 |

== Wu Lin Feng 2018: World Championship Nanyang ==
Wu Lin Feng 2018: World Championship Nanyang
- Promotion: Wu Lin Feng
- Date: May 05, 2018
- Venue: Nanyang Sports Center
- City: Nanyang, Henan, China

Wu Lin Feng 2018: World Championship Nanyang was a kickboxing event held on May 05, 2018 in Nanyang, Henan, China.

=== Results ===
Main Card
| Weight Class | | | | Method | Round | Time | Notes |
|---|---|---|---|---|---|---|---|
| Kickboxing -77kg | (China) Fu Gaofeng | def. | (Spain) Maximo Suarez | KO (Left Hook) | 1 |
| Kickboxing -63kg | (China) Wang Wanli | def. | (Japan) Super Anji | Decision | 3 | 3:00 |
| Kickboxing -72kg | (China) Dong Wenfei | def. | (Germany) Dima Weimer | Decision | 3 | 3:00 |
| Kickboxing -68kg | (Thailand) Teerachai | def. | (China) Meng Qinghao | Decision (Unanimous) | 3 | 3:00 |
| Kickboxing -70kg | (China) Zhong Weipeng | def. | (Cyprus) Manolis Michael | Decision (Unanimous) | 3 | 3:00 |
| Kickboxing -63kg | (Thailand) Kunbut | def. | (China) Wang Zhiwei | Decision (Unanimous) | 3 | 3:00 |
| Kickboxing -60kg | (China) Zhu Shuai | def. | (Australia) Josh Tonna | Decision (Unanimous) | 3 | 3:00 |
| Kickboxing -58kg | (China) Xue Shenzhe | def. | (Japan) Yuki Miwa | TKO | 3 |

== Wu Lin Feng 2018: World Championship Yichun ==
Wu Lin Feng 2018: World Championship Yichun
- Promotion: Wu Lin Feng
- Date: May 19, 2018
- Venue: Yichun Mingyue Mountain eco Garden
- City: Yichun, Jiangxi, China

Wu Lin Feng 2018: World Championship Yichun was a kickboxing event held on May 19, 2018 in Yichun, Jiangxi, China.

=== Results ===
Main Card
| Weight Class | | | | Method | Round | Time | Notes |
|---|---|---|---|---|---|---|---|
| Kickboxing -75kg | (Russia) Jamal Yusupov | def. | (China) Sun Weiqiang | Decision (Unanimous) | 3 | 3:00 |
| Kickboxing -67kg | (China) Meng Guodong | def. | (Brazil) Victor Hugo Nunes | Decision | 3 | 3:00 |
| Kickboxing -64kg | (China) Jin Ying | def. | (Papua New Guinea) Jonathan Tuhu | Decision (Unanimous) | 3 | 3:00 |
| Kickboxing -80kg | (China) Liu Dacheng | def. | (Hungary) Patrick Vidakovics | Decision (Majority) | 3 | 3:00 |
| Kickboxing -70kg | (China) Zhao Yan | vs. | (Belarus) Farkhad Akhmejanau |
| Kickboxing Women -56kg | (China) Li Lingling | def. | (Australia) Yolanda Schmidt | Decision | 3 | 3:00 |
| Kickboxing -60kg | (China) Wang Junyu | vs. | (Russia) Georgii Kudrenko |
| Kickboxing -67kg | (Brazil) Isaac Julio | def. | (China) Long Yu | TKO (Injury) |
| Kickboxing -63kg | (China) Fang Feida | def. | (Thailand) Kunbut | Decision | 3 | 3:00 |
| Kickboxing -60kg | (China) Wang Wanli | vs. | (Thailand) Arannchai Kiatpatarapran |
| Kickboxing -60kg | (China) Xue Shenzhen | def. | (Russia) Tagir Khalilov | Decision | 3 | 3:00 |
| Kickboxing -60kg | (China) Zhao Boshi | def. | (Japan) Yusuke Kojima | KO | 2 |
| Kickboxing -60kg | (France) Raphaël Llodra | def. | (China) Ni Shi | KO | 2 |

== Wu Lin Feng 2018: Yi Long VS Saiyok ==
Wu Lin Feng 2018: Yi Long VS Saiyok
- Promotion: Wu Lin Feng
- Date: June 02, 2018
- Venue: Zhongxian Three Gorges harbour
- City: Chongqing, China

Wu Lin Feng 2018: Yi Long VS Saiyok was a kickboxing event held on June 02, 2018 in Chongqing, China.

=== Results ===
Main Card
| Weight Class | | | | Method | Round | Time | Notes |
|---|---|---|---|---|---|---|---|
| Kickboxing -75kg | (Thailand) Saiyok Pumpanmuang | def. | (China) Yi Long | KO (Left High Kick + Right Hook) | 1 | 2:30 |
| Kickboxing -67kg | (Spain) David Mejia | def. | (China) Xie Lei | Ext.R Decision | 4 | 3:00 |
| Kickboxing Women -60kg | (China) Ling Mingrui | def. | (Russia) Irina Mazepa | Decision | 3 | 3:00 |
| Kickboxing -70kg | (China) Song Shaoqiu | def. | (Romania) Alex Bublea | Decision | 3 | 3:00 |
| Kickboxing -65kg | (Germany) Dennis Wosik | def. | (China) Wang Zhiwei | Decision | 3 | 3:00 |
| Kickboxing -65kg | (China) Zhao Chuanlin | def. | (Netherlands) Lennart Blijd | Ext.R Decision | 4 | 3:00 |

== Wu Lin Feng 2018: China vs Netherlands & Russia ==
Wu Lin Feng 2018: China vs Netherlands & Russia
- Promotion: Wu Lin Feng
- Date: June 16, 2018
- Venue: Shenyang Olympic Sports Center Stadium
- City: Shenyang, China

Wu Lin Feng 2018: China vs Netherlands & Russia was a kickboxing event held on June 16, 2018 in Shenyang, China.

=== Results ===
Main Card
| Weight Class | | | | Method | Round | Time | Notes |
|---|---|---|---|---|---|---|---|
| Kickboxing -75kg | (Russia) Jamal Yusupov | def. | (China) Xu Zhenhuang | TKO | 1 | 2:00 |
| Kickboxing -70kg | (China) Song Shaoqiu | def. | (Russia) Roman Gurin | Decision | 3 | 3:00 |
| Kickboxing -70kg | (China) Liu Guicheng | def. | (Brazil) Victor Hugo Nunes | KO (Spinning back kick) | 3 | 1:34 |
| Kickboxing -60kg | (China) Liu Jianli | def. | (Japan) Daisuke | Decision | 3 | 3:00 |
| Kickboxing -67kg | (China) Xie Wei | vs. | (Thailand) Teerachai |
| Kickboxing -80kg | (Netherlands) Regian Eersel | def. | (China) Nu Erla | KO | 2 |
| Kickboxing -90kg | (China) Hao Guanghua | def. | (Netherlands) Masoud Rahimi | KO | 1 |
| Kickboxing -65kg | (China) Liu Qiliang | def. | (Netherlands) Dimitri Zafiroudis | KO | 2 |
| Kickboxing -60kg | (Netherlands) Pietro Doorje | def. | (China) Zhu Shuai | Decision (Unanimous) | 3 | 3:00 |
| Kickboxing -60kg | (China) Zhao Boshi | def. | (Netherlands) Michel Olensky | Decision (Unanimous) | 3 | 3:00 |
| Kickboxing -80kg | (Russia) Alexander Stetsurenko | def. | (China) Liu Dacheng | Decision (Unanimous) | 3 | 3:00 |
| Kickboxing -70kg | (China) Zhong Weipeng | def. | (Russia) Armen Israelyan | Decision | 3 | 3:00 |
| Kickboxing -70kg | (Russia) Iavn Ryabov | def. | (China) Zhao Yan | Decision | 3 | 3:00 |
| Kickboxing -67kg | (China) Wang Pengfei | def. | (Russia) Klimov | Decision (Unanimous) | 3 | 3:00 |
| Kickboxing -63kg | (Russia) Dimitri Ivanov | def. | (China) Yuan Ya | Decision | 3 | 3:00 |

== Wu Lin Feng 2018: WLF -67kg World Cup 2018-2019 1st Round ==
Wu Lin Feng 2018: WLF -67kg World Cup 2018-2019 1st Round
- Promotion: Wu Lin Feng
- Date: July 07, 2018
- Venue: Henan Provincial Stadium
- City: Zhengzhou, China

Wu Lin Feng 2018: WLF -67kg World Cup 2018-2019 1st Round was a kickboxing event held on June 16, 2018 in Zhengzhou, China.

=== Results ===
Main Card
| Weight Class | | | | Method | Round | Time | Notes |
|---|---|---|---|---|---|---|---|
| Kickboxing -67kg | (China) Song Shaqoiu | def. | (Russia) Vladimir Shuliak | Decision (Unanimous) | 3 | 3:00 |
| Kickboxing -67kg | (China) Liu Xiangming | def. | (Russia) Takhmasib Kerimov | Decision (Unanimous) | 3 | 3:00 |
| Kickboxing -67kg | (Thailand) Petchtanong Banchamek | def. | (China) Zhang Junyu | Decision (Unanimous) | 3 | 3:00 | WLF -67kg World Cup Group B |
| Kickboxing -67kg | (China) Lu Jun | def. | (China) Xie Lei | Decision | 3 | 3:00 | WLF -67kg World Cup Group B |
| Kickboxing Women -57kg | (China) Huang Li | def. | (Australia) Brooke Farrell | Decision | 3 | 3:00 |
| Kickboxing -67kg | (Thailand) Jomthong Chuwattana | def. | (China) Wang Pengfei | Decision (Unanimous) | 3 | 3:00 | WLF -67kg World Cup Group A |
| Kickboxing -67kg | (China) Jia Aoqi | def. | (China) Meng Qinghao | Decision (Unanimous) | 3 | 3:00 | WLF -67kg World Cup Group A |
| Kickboxing -67kg | (Russia) Aleksei Ulianov | def. | (China) Liu Yong | Decision | 3 | 3:00 | WLF -67kg World Cup Reserve Fight |
| Kickboxing -65kg | (Thailand) Manas Thodkui | def. | (China) Liu Qiliang | Decision | 3 | 3:00 |
| Kickboxing -65kg | (China) Zheng Bo | def. | (Azerbaijan) Odil Fozilov | Decision | 3 | 3:00 |
| Kickboxing -63kg | (Brazil) Fabrício Andrade | def. | (China) Fang Feida | Decision | 3 | 3:00 |
| Kickboxing -78kg | (Hungary) Patrik Vidakovicq | def. | (China) Guo Shun | TKO (High Kick) | 1 | 1:40 |
| Kickboxing -62kg | (Belarus) Eduard Mikhovich | def. | (China) Chen Yong | Decision | 3 | 3:00 |

== Wu Lin Feng 2018: WLF x Krush 90 - China vs Japan ==
Wu Lin Feng 2018: WLF x Krush 90 - China vs Japan
- Promotion: K-1
- Date: July 22, 2018
- Venue: Korakuen Hall
- City: Tokyo, Japan

Wu Lin Feng 2018: WLF x Krush 90 - China vs Japan was a kickboxing event held on July 22, 2018 in Tokyo, Japan.

=== Results ===
Main Card
| Weight Class | | | | Method | Round | Time | Notes |
|---|---|---|---|---|---|---|---|
| Kickboxing -58.5kg | (Japan) Hirotaka Urabe | def. | (China) Xue Shenzheng | Decision (Unanimous) | 3 | 3:00 |
| Kickboxing -64kg | (Japan) Daizo Sasaki | def. | (China) Wang Zhiwei | Decision (Unanimous) | 3 | 3:00 |
| Kickboxing -65kg | (Japan) Yasuomi Soda | def. | (China) Meng Guodong | KO (Left Hook to the Body) | 2 | 2:55 |
| Kickboxing -60kg | (China) Fu Gaofeng | def. | (Japan) Kenta Takagi | TKO (Left Hook) | 1 | 1:18 |
| Kickboxing -60kg | (Japan) Leona Pettas | def. | (China) Zhao Chongyang | TKO (Punches) | 2 | 2:49 |
| Kickboxing -64kg | (Japan) Hayato Suzuki | def. | (China) Jin Ying | Decision (Unanimous) | 3 | 3:00 |
| Kickboxing -60kg | (Japan) Naoki Yamamoto | def. | (China) Wang Junyu | Ext.R Decision (Unanimous) | 4 | 3:00 |
| Kickboxing -65kg | (Japan) Daiki Matsushita | def. | (Japan) Joji | KO | 2 | 2:13 |
| Kickboxing -63kg | (Japan) Shuji Kawarada | def. | (Japan) Kota Nakano | Decision (Unanimous) | 3 | 3:00 |
| Kickboxing -57kg | (Japan) Yuki Miwa | def. | (Japan) Genki Adachi | Decision (Majority) | 3 | 3:00 |
| Kickboxing -63kg | (Japan) Kazumasa Sekikawa | def. | (Japan) Kazuki Yamashita | Decision (Unanimous) | 3 | 3:00 |
| Kickboxing -67kg | (Japan) Kona Kato | def. | (Japan) Kazuma Takekoshi | TKO (Punches) | 1 | 1:29 |

== Wu Lin Feng 2018: WLF -67kg World Cup 2018-2019 2nd Round ==
Wu Lin Feng 2018: WLF -67kg World Cup 2018-2019 2nd Round
- Promotion: Wu Lin Feng
- Date: August 04, 2018
- City: Zhengzhou, China

Wu Lin Feng 2018: WLF -67kg World Cup 2018-2019 2nd Round was a kickboxing event held on August 04, 2018 in Zhengzhou, China.

=== Results ===
Main Card
| Weight Class | | | | Method | Round | Time | Notes |
|---|---|---|---|---|---|---|---|
| Kickboxing -67kg | (Belarus) Andrei Kulebin | def. | (China) Hu Yafei | Decision | 3 | 3:00 | WLF -67kg World Cup Group D |
| Kickboxing -67kg | (China) Yang Zhuo | def. | (Russia) Sergey Kosykh | Decision (Unanimous) | 3 | 3:00 | WLF -67kg World Cup Group D |
| Kickboxing Women -57kg | (China) Li Mingrui | def. | (Spain) Claudia Diaz | Decision | 3 | 3:00 |
| Kickboxing -58kg | (China) Zhao Fuxiang | vs. | (Thailand) Konkeanlek Sitpholek |
| Kickboxing -75kg | (Spain) Sebastian Mendez | def. | (China) Jiao Fukai | Decision | 3 | 3:00 |
| Kickboxing -67kg | (Turkey) Hasan Toy | def. | (Spain) David Mejia | Decision (Unanimous) | 3 | 3:00 | WLF -67kg World Cup Group C |
| Kickboxing -67kg | (Portugal) Diego Freitas | def. | (Russia) Dzhabar Askerov | Decision | 3 | 3:00 | WLF -67kg World Cup Group C |
| Kickboxing -61kg | (China) Zhu Shuai | def. | (Belarus) Eduard Mikhovich | Decision (Unanimous) | 3 | 3:00 |
| Kickboxing -73kg | (China) Ni Shi | vs. | (Russia) Dmitrii Demin |
| Kickboxing -65kg | (China) Hu Zheng | vs. | (Russia) Odil Fozilov |
| Kickboxing -70kg | (China) Zhangren | vs. | (Russia) Ramil Novruzov |
| Kickboxing -62kg | (China) Wang Wanli | vs. | (Russia) Takhmasib Kerimov |
| Kickboxing -60kg | (China) Zhang Lanpei | def. | (France) Alexis Barateau | KO (Body kick) | 1 | 0:30 |

== Wu Lin Feng 2018: WLF x OSS Fighters - China vs Romania ==
Wu Lin Feng 2018: WLF x OSS Fighters - China vs Romania
- Promotion: Wu Lin Feng; OSS Fighters
- Date: August 24, 2018
- Venue: Piateta Cazino
- City: Mamaia, Romania

Wu Lin Feng 2018: WLF x OSS Fighters - China vs Romania was a kickboxing event held on August 24, 2018 in Mamaia, Romania.

=== Results ===
Main Card
| Weight Class | | | | Method | Round | Time | Notes |
|---|---|---|---|---|---|---|---|
| Kickboxing -95kg | (Romania) Andrei Stoica | def. | (Lithuania) Tomas Steponkevicius | Decision (Unanimous) | 3 | 3:00 |
| Kickboxing -80kg | (Romania) Cristian Milea | def. | (France) Kamara Madicke | Decision (Unanimous) | 5 | 3:00 | WKN Sueper Welterweight Title Fight |
| Kickboxing -80kg | (Romania) Enzo Minca | def. | (Romania) Mustafa Ozel | Decision (Unanimous) | 3 |
| Kickboxing -93kg | (China) Hao Guanghua | def. | (Romania) Bogdan Stoica | DQ (Illegal Knee) | 3 |
| Kickboxing -64kg | (Romania) Adrian Maxim | def. | (China) Jin Ying | Decision (Unanimous) | 3 | 3:00 |
| Kickboxing -72.5kg | (Romania) Gabriel Bozan | def. | (China) Li Zi Kai | Decision (Unanimous) | 3 | 3:00 |
| Kickboxing -87kg | (Romania) Dragos Imbrea | def. | (China) Zhou Wei | No Contest |
| Kickboxing -77kg | (Romania) Adrian Mitu | def. | (China) Li Hui Chao | Decision (Unanimous) | 3 | 3:00 |
| Kickboxing -75kg | (Romania) Valentin Pascali | def. | (China) Ma Shuo | Decision (Unanimous) | 3 | 3:00 |
| Kickboxing -62.5kg | (Romania) Cristian Spetcu | def. | (China) Fang Feida | Decision (Unanimous) | 3 | 3:00 |
| Kickboxing -71kg | (China) Song Shaoqiu | def. | (Romania) Marian Dinu | Decision (Unanimous) | 3 | 3:00 |
| Kickboxing -78kg | (China) Duoli Chen | def. | (Romania) Mirel Iacob | Decision (Split) | 3 | 3:00 |

== Wu Lin Feng 2018: WLF -67kg World Cup 2018-2019 3rd Round ==
Wu Lin Feng 2018: WLF -67kg World Cup 2018-2019 3rd Round
- Promotion: Wu Lin Feng
- Date: September 01, 2018
- City: Zhengzhou, China

Wu Lin Feng 2018: WLF -67kg World Cup 2018-2019 3rd Round was a kickboxing event held on September 01, 2018 in Zhengzhou, China.

=== Results ===
Main Card
| Weight Class | | | | Method | Round | Time | Notes |
|---|---|---|---|---|---|---|---|
| Kickboxing -67kg | (Thailand) Petchtanong Banchamek | def. | (China) Lu Jun | Decision | 3 | 3:00 | WLF -67kg World Cup Group B |
| Kickboxing -67kg | (China) Xie Lei | def. | (China) Zhang Chunyu | Decision | 3 | 3:00 | WLF -67kg World Cup Group B |
| Kickboxing Women -56kg | (China) Li Mingrui | def. | (Australia) Yolanda Schmidt | Decision | 3 | 3:00 |
| Kickboxing -67kg | (Russia) Aleksei Ulianov | def. | (Thailand) Jomthong Chuwattana | Decision | 3 | 3:00 | WLF -67kg World Cup Group A |
| Kickboxing | (Thailand) Teerachai | def. | (China) Lu Jianbo | Ext.R Decision (Unanimous) | 4 | 3:00 |
| Kickboxing -67kg | (China) Wang Pengfei | def. | (China) Meng Qinghao | Decision | 3 | 3:00 | WLF -67kg World Cup Group A |
| Kickboxing -58kg | (China) Xue Shenzhen | def. | (Brazil) Victor Helder | Decision (Unanimous) | 3 | 3:00 |
| Kickboxing -72kg | (China) Zhao Yan | def. | (Russia) Dmitrii Demin | KO | 2 | 1:40 |
| Kickboxing -70kg | (China) Liu Guicheng | def. | (Russia) Vladimir Shuliak | Decision | 3 | 3:00 |
| Kickboxing -65kg | (China) Hu Zheng | def. | (Ukraine) Valeri Abramenko | KO (Left Hook to the Body) | 1 | 1:30 |
| Kickboxing -67kg | (Spain) Alejandro Perez | def. | (China) Ren Hang | Decision | 3 | 3:00 |
| Kickboxing -60kg | (Brazil) Fabrício Andrade | def. | (China) Chen Yong | Decision (Unanimous) | 3 | 3:00 |
| Kickboxing -60kg | (Brazil) Walter Goncalves | def. | (China) Hao Yijie | KO (Front Kick) | 3 |
| Kickboxing -65kg | (China) Wang Junyu | def. | (Belarus) Eduard Mikhovich | Decision | 3 | 3:00 |
| Kickboxing -65kg | (China) Wang Wanli | def. | (Mongolia) Sandui Batjargal | Decision | 3 | 3:00 |
| Kickboxing -65kg | (China) Shi Qinjie | def. | (Iran) Hadi Kohshhal | TKO | 3 |
| Kickboxing -60kg | (Iran) Javad Heidari | def. | (China) Yang Ming | Decision | 3 | 3:00 |
| Kickboxing -66kg | (China) Li Xin | def. | (Azerbaijan) Ramil Novruzov | Decision | 3 | 3:00 |

== Wu Lin Feng 2018: WLF -67kg World Cup 2018-2019 4th Round ==
Wu Lin Feng 2018: WLF -67kg World Cup 2018-2019 4th Round
- Promotion: Wu Lin Feng
- Date: October 06, 2018
- City: Shangqiu, China

Wu Lin Feng 2018: WLF -67kg World Cup 2018-2019 4th Round was a kickboxing event held on October 06, 2018 in Shangqiu, China.

=== Results ===
Main Card
| Weight Class | | | | Method | Round | Time | Notes |
|---|---|---|---|---|---|---|---|
| Kickboxing -70kg | (China) Dong Wenfei | def. | (Greece) Giannis Boukis | Decision (Unanimous) | 3 | 3:00 |
| Kickboxing -67kg | (Belarus) Andrei Kulebin | def. | (China) Sergey Kosykh | Decision (Unanimous) | 3 | 3:00 | WLF -67kg World Cup Group D |
| Kickboxing -67kg | (China) Yang Zhuo | def. | (China) Hu Yafei | Decision (Unanimous) | 3 | 3:00 | WLF -67kg World Cup Group D |
| Kickboxing -60kg | (Japan) Hirotaka Asahisa | def. | (China) Fang Feida | TKO | 2 | 0:51 |
| Kickboxing -67kg | (Turkey) Hasan Toy | def. | (China) Liu Yaning | TKO | 2 | 2:45 | WLF -67kg World Cup Group C |
| Kickboxing -67kg | (Portugal) Diego Freitas | def. | (Spain) David Mejia | Ext.R Decision (Unanimous) | 4 | 3:00 | WLF -67kg World Cup Group C |
| Kickboxing -60kg | (China) Chen Yong | def. | (Japan) Masakazu Ashikaga | Decision (Unanimous) | 3 | 3:00 |
| Kickboxing -70kg | (China) Wang Keqing | vs. | (Estonia) Andy Banchamek |
| Kickboxing -70kg | (China) Zhang Mengfei | vs. | (Russia) Dmitrii Demin |
| Kickboxing -65kg | (China) Hu Zheng | vs. | (Greece) Kostas Papadopoulos |
| Kickboxing -65kg | (China) Zhao Chuanlin | vs. | (Thailand) Seurhoy Banchamek |
| Kickboxing Women -57kg | (China) Yang Ruijie | vs. | (Australia) Brooke Farrell |
| Kickboxing -68kg | (China) Zhang Ren | vs. | (Greece) Stefanos |
| Kickboxing -65kg | (China) Shi Qinjie | vs. | (Mongolia) Bazarsang |
| Kickboxing -60kg | (China) Xue Shenzhen | vs. | (Azerbaijan) Abdulayev |
| Kickboxing -60kg | (China) Song Meixiao | vs. | (China) Bibei |

== Wu Lin Feng 2018: China vs Canada ==
Wu Lin Feng 2018: China vs Canada
- Promotion: Wu Lin Feng WAKO Canada
- Date: October 13, 2018
- Venue: Pan Am Sport Centre
- City: Markham, Ontario, Canada

Wu Lin Feng 2018: China vs Canada was a kickboxing event held on October 13, 2018 in Markham, Ontario, Canada.

=== Results ===
Main Card
| Weight Class | | | | Method | Round | Time | Notes |
|---|---|---|---|---|---|---|---|
| Kickboxing -81kg | (China) Liu Dacheng | def. | (Canada) Rob Buxton | Decision (Unanimous) | 3 | 3:00 |
| Kickboxing -67kg | (Canada) Richard Pham | def. | (China) Ji Xiang | Decision (Unanimous) | 3 | 3:00 |
| Kickboxing -72kg | (China) Song Shaoqiu | def. | (Canada) Adam Webber | Decision | 3 | 3:00 |
| Kickboxing -63kg | (Canada) Ferdaws Nayimi | def. | (China) Zhu Shuai | Decision | 3 | 3:00 |
| Kickboxing -75kg | (Canada) Thomas Raby | def. | (China) Ma Shuo | TKO (dislocated shoulder) | 2 |
| Kickboxing -64kg | (China) Jin Ying | def. | (Canada) Amro Al Falastini | Decision | 3 | 3:00 |
| Kickboxing -64kg | (Canada) Maurice Pompey | def. | (China) Zheng Bo | Decision (Unanimous) | 3 | 3:00 |
| Kickboxing -62kg | (Canada) Brandon Leaman | def. | (China) Zheng Ke | KO (High Kick) | 1 | 2:28 |
| Kickboxing -62kg | (China) Zhang Lanpei | def. | (Canada) Liam Gallagher | Decision (Unanimous) | 3 | 3:00 |
| Kickboxing -62kg | (Canada) Hashmat Naziri | def. | (Canada) Preston Farrell | Decision (Split) | 3 | 3:00 |

== Wu Lin Feng 2018: WLF -67kg World Cup 2018-2019 5th Round ==
Wu Lin Feng 2018: WLF -67kg World Cup 2018-2019 5th Round
- Promotion: Wu Lin Feng
- Date: November 03, 2018
- City: China

Wu Lin Feng 2018: WLF -67kg World Cup 2018-2019 5th Round was a kickboxing event held on November 03, 2018 in China.

=== Results ===
Main Card
| Weight Class | | | | Method | Round | Time | Notes |
|---|---|---|---|---|---|---|---|
| Kickboxing -80kg | (Russia) Alexander Stetsurenko | def. | (China) Fu Gaofeng | TKO (4 Knockdowns) | 3 | 0:50 |
| Kickboxing -67kg | (Thailand) Jomthong Chuwattana | def. | (China) Meng Qinghao | Decision (Unanimous) | 3 | 3:00 | WLF -67kg World Cup Group A |
| Kickboxing -67kg | (Russia) Aleksei Ulianov | def. | (China) Wang Pengfei | Decision (Unanimous) | 3 | 3:00 | WLF -67kg World Cup Group A |
| Kickboxing Women -56kg | (China) Huang Li | def. | (Portugal) Rita Carvalho | Decision (Unanimous) | 3 | 3:00 |
| Kickboxing -67kg | (Thailand) Petchtanong Banchamek | def. | (China) Xie Lei | Decision (Unanimous) | 3 | 3:00 | WLF -67kg World Cup Group B |
| Kickboxing -67kg | (China) Zhang Chunyu | def. | (China) Lu Jun | Ext.R Decision (Unanimous) | 4 | 3:00 | WLF -67kg World Cup Group B |
| Kickboxing -67kg | (China) Ji Xiang | def. | (Mongolia) Batjargal Sandui | Decision | 3 | 3:00 |
| Kickboxing -65kg | (China) Liu Xiangming | def. | (Russia) Kazbek Alisultanov | Ext.R Decision | 4 | 3:00 |
| Kickboxing -65kg | (China) Li Xin | def. | (Thailand) Maenphayak Wanwiset | Decision | 3 | 3:00 |
| Kickboxing -70kg | (Estonia) Andi Banchamek | def. | (China) Hu Yafei | Decision | 3 | 3:00 |
| Kickboxing -65kg | (China) Pan Jiayun | def. | (Russia) Tamerlan Bashirov | KO (Spinning back Kick to the Body) | 1 | 2:05 |
| Kickboxing Women -55kg | (China) Zhang Meng | def. | (Germany) Farida Okiko | Decision | 3 | 3:00 |
| Kickboxing -60kg | (Brazil) Walter Goncalves | def. | (China) Tian Zongyao | KO (Middle Kick) | 1 | 2:05 |
| Kickboxing -70kg | (Netherlands) Jos Van Belzen | def. | (China) Zhao Xiaoyu | Decision | 3 | 3:00 |

== Wu Lin Feng 2018: China vs Australia ==
Wu Lin Feng 2018: China vs Australia
- Promotion: Wu Lin Feng
- Date: November 04, 2018
- Venue: Melbourne Convention Exhibition Center
- City: Melbourne, Australia

Wu Lin Feng 2018: China vs Australia was a kickboxing event held on November 04, 2018 in Melbourne, Australia.

=== Results ===
Main Card
| Weight Class | | | | Method | Round | Time | Notes |
|---|---|---|---|---|---|---|---|
| Kickboxing -90kg | (Australia) Aaron Goodson | def. | (China) Zhou Wei | Decision (Unanimous) | 3 | 3:00 |
| Kickboxing Women -57kg | (China) Li Mingrui | def. | (Australia) Alicia Pestana | Decision (Unanimous) | 3 | 3:00 |
| Kickboxing -64kg | (Australia) Alexi Petroulias | def. | (China) Wang Wanli | Decision (Unanimous) | 3 | 3:00 |
| Kickboxing | (China) Xue Shenzheng | def. | (Australia) Ramen Habib | Decision (Unanimous) | 3 | 3:00 |
| Kickboxing -63kg | (China) Zhao Chongyang | def. | (Australia) Mark Mullan | KO (Left Hook) | 3 | 1:20 |
| Kickboxing -70kg | (China) Ni Shi | vs. | (Australia) Michael Howard |
| Kickboxing -65kg | (China) Meng Guodong | vs. | (Australia) Lee Fook |
| Kickboxing -70kg | (China) Song Shaoqiu | vs. | (Australia) Ntahan Robson |
| Kickboxing -83kg | (China) Wang Zhiguo | vs. | (Australia) Andrew van der Poel |

== Wu Lin Feng 2018: WLF x KF1 ==
Wu Lin Feng 2018: WLF x KF1
- Promotion: KF1; Wu Lin Feng
- Date: November 07, 2018
- City: Hong Kong

Wu Lin Feng 2018: WLF x KF1 was a kickboxing event held on November 07, 2018 in Hong Kong.

=== Results ===
Main Card
| Weight Class | | | | Method | Round | Time | Notes |
|---|---|---|---|---|---|---|---|
| Kickboxing -48kg | (China) Chen Qixuan | vs. | (Hong Kong) Emmanuel |
| Kickboxing -70kg | (China) Dong Wenfei | vs. | (Russia) Ruslan |
| Kickboxing -59kg | (China) Chen Qcong | vs. | (Korea) Seungbum |
| Kickboxing -65kg | (China) Hu Zheng | vs. | (Netherlands) Jan Kaffa |
| Kickboxing -60kg | (China) Wang Junyu | vs. | (Russia) Sergey |
| Kickboxing Women -48kg | (Portugal) Anais Melissa | def. | (Hong Kong) Zhu Qiong | Decision | 3 | 3:00 |
| Kickboxing Women -48kg | (Hong Kong) Candy Wu | def. | (Thailand) Nisarat | Decision | 3 | 3:00 |
| Kickboxing -50kg | (Hong Kong) Chen Qidi | def. | (Thailand) Waiyawut | Decision | 3 | 3:00 |
| Kickboxing -60kg | (Brazil) Fabrício Andrade | def. | (China) Zhang Lanpei | Decision | 3 | 3:00 |

== Wu Lin Feng 2018: WLF -67kg World Cup 2018-2019 6th Round ==
Wu Lin Feng 2018: WLF -67kg World Cup 2018-2019 6th Round
- Promotion: Wu Lin Feng
- Date: December 01, 2018
- City: Zhengzhou, China

Wu Lin Feng 2018: WLF -67kg World Cup 2018-2019 6th Round was a kickboxing event held on December 01, 2018 in Zhengzhou, China.

=== Results ===
Main Card
| Weight Class | | | | Method | Round | Time | Notes |
|---|---|---|---|---|---|---|---|
| Kickboxing -75kg | (China) Sun Weiqiang | def. | (Italy) Rosario Presti | Decision | 3 | 3:00 |
| Kickboxing -67kg | (China) Yang Zhuo | def. | (Belarus) Andrei Kulebin | Decision (Split) | 3 | 3:00 | WLF -67kg World Cup Group D |
| Kickboxing -67kg | (China) Hu Yafei | def. | (Russia) Sergey Kosykh | KO | | | WLF -67kg World Cup Group D |
| Kickboxing -63kg | (China) Jin Ying | def. | (Russia) Kazbek Alisultanov | Decision | 3 | 3:00 |
| Kickboxing -67kg | (Turkey) Hasan Toy | def. | (Portugal) Diego Freitas | Decision | 3 | 3:00 | WLF -67kg World Cup Group C |
| Kickboxing -67kg | (Spain) David Mejia | def. | (China) Liu Yaning | Decision | 3 | 3:00 | WLF -67kg World Cup Group C |
| Kickboxing -64.5kg | (Ukraine) Igor Liubchenko | def. | (China) Wang Zhiwei | Decision | 3 | 3:00 |
| Kickboxing -60kg | (China) Wang Junyu | def. | (China) Zhu Shuai | Decision (Majority) | 3 | 3:00 | WLF -60kg Contender Tournament Final |
| Kickboxing -60kg | (China) Wei Weiyang | vs. | (Russia) Ildot Ismonov | Decision (unanimous) | 3 | 3:00 |
| Kickboxing -65kg | (China) Liu Mingxin | vs. | (Brazil) Victor Hugo Nunes |
| Kickboxing -60kg | (China) Zhao Chongyang | def. | (Japan) KJ Hiroshi | KO (Corner Stoppage) | 1 | 2:55 | WLF -60kg Contender Tournament Reserve |
| Kickboxing -60kg | (China) Zhu Shuai | def. | (Brazil) Fabrício Andrade | TKO | 2 | | WLF -60kg Contender Tournament Semi Final |
| Kickboxing -60kg | (China) Wang Junyu | def. | (Belgium) Rocco La Rosa | Decision (Unanimous) | 3 | 3:00 | WLF -60kg Contender Tournament Semi Final |
| Kickboxing Women -56kg | (China) Li Mingrui | def. | (France) Souris Manfredi | Decision (Unanimous) | 3 | 3:00 |
| Kickboxing -70kg | (China) Zhong Weipeng | vs. | (Belarus) Arthur Isayans |
| Kickboxing -75kg | (China) Xu Yong | vs. | (Russia) Vladimir Gabov |
| Kickboxing -63kg | (China) Liu Ja | def. | (Japan) Jun Ishida | TKO | 1 | 0:12 |
| Kickboxing -80kg | (China) Liu Dacheng | vs. | (Russia) Aleksei Dmitriev |

== Wu Lin Feng 2018: WLF x S1 - China vs Thailand ==
Wu Lin Feng 2018: WLF x S1 - China vs Thailand
- Promotion: S1; Wu Lin Feng
- Date: December 08, 2018
- City: Thailand

Wu Lin Feng 2018: WLF x S1 - China vs Thailand was a kickboxing event held on December 08, 2018 in Thailand.

=== Results ===
Main Card
| Weight Class | | | | Method | Round | Time | Notes |
|---|---|---|---|---|---|---|---|
| Kickboxing -71kg | (China) Dong Wenfei | def. | (Thailand) Daoden Korat | KO (Body Shots) | | | S-1 World Championship -70kg title |
| Kickboxing -65kg | (China) Liu Xiangming | vs. | (Thailand) Panpayak Jareon |
| Kickboxing Women -56kg | (China) Huang Li | vs. | (Thailand) Ticha Sukothai |
| Muay Thai -68kg | (China) Xie Wei | vs. | (Thailand) Singsuk Mor.Wattanacha |
| Kickboxing -60kg | (China) Yang Ming | vs. | (Thailand) Choodcho Tor.Laksong |
| Kickboxing -70kg | (China) Meng Fanyu | vs. | (Thailand) Neungsiam Ketnakornchol |
| Kickboxing -60kg | (China) Zheng Bo | vs. | (Thailand) Phetkriankraib Tor.Silachai | | | | S-1 World Championship -65kg title |
| Kickboxing -60kg | (China) Zhang Lanpei | def. | (Thailand) Changnenlek | Decision | 3 | 3:00 |
| Kickboxing -65kg | (China) Li Xin | vs. | (Thailand) Payanoi Sitniwat |
| Kickboxing -67kg | (China) Ji Xiang | vs. | (Thailand) Chandet Kor.Adisorn |

== See also ==
- 2018 in Glory
- 2018 in Glory of Heroes
- 2018 in Kunlun Fight
- 2018 in K-1
