= Yi Long =

Chinese martial artist (born 1987)

Yi Long Ma
- Born: Liu Xingjun 刘星君/劉星君; April 1, 1987 (age 39); Dezhou, Shandong, China
- Native name: 马一龙
- Other names: Faquir Yi Long; Shaolin Monk
- Nationality: Chinese
- Height: 1.76 m (5 ft 9 1/2 in)
- Weight: 80 kg (176 lb; 13 st)
- Division: Welterweight; Lightweight
- Style: Shaolin Kung Fu; Wing Chun; Sanda; Muay Thai; Kickboxing
- Stance: Orthodox
- Team: Yi Long Ao Yu Fight Club
- Years active: 2009–present

Kickboxing record
- Total: 76
- Wins: 62
- By knockout: 24
- Losses: 13
- By knockout: 6
- Draws: 1

Other information
- Website: http://weibo.com/aloong1987
- Last updated on: June 2, 2018

Yi Long Ma (Chinese: 马一龙; pinyin: yī lóng ma), birth name Liu Xingjun (Chinese: 刘星君; pinyin: Liú Xīngjūn), is a Chinese martial artist, Wu Lin Feng based kickboxer, Wushu and other martial arts practitioner who competes in the Super Welterweight, Welterweight and Super Middleweight divisions.

Born in Dezhou, Shandong, Yi is self-trained in Shaolin Kung Fu.

He was the 2007 Guangdong Foshan International Wing Chun champion.

In the summer of 2009, he began to fight in Wu Lin Feng.

Yi Long previously had called himself the "number 1 Shaolin Kung Fu Monk" despite the Shaolin temple had explained the fighter is unaffiliated with them in 2010.

== Championships and awards ==
- 2013 Wu Lin Feng World champion
- 2015 WCK World Champion
- 2014 S-1 Muaythai Super Middleweight World champion
- 2014 Wu Lin Feng World champion -73.5 kg
- 2012 CIK World Champion

== Fight record ==
Professional Kickboxing record
62 wins (24 (T)KOs), 13 losses, 1 draw
Date	Result	Opponent	Event	Location	Method	Round	Time
2024-05-07	Loss	(Japan) Yasuhiro Kido	Space One Champions 2024	Hong Kong	KO (High kick)	1	2:06
2021-10-30	Win	(Morocco) Ayoub Faiz	Wu Lin Feng 2021: WLF on Haihua Island	Danzhou, China	KO	1	
2018-11-10	Win	(South Korea) Choi Hong-man	MAS FIGHT	Macau, China	TKO	1	0:30
2018-06-02	Loss	(Thailand) Saiyok Pumpanmuang	Wu Lin Feng 2018: Yi Long VS Saiyok	Chongqing, China	KO (Left High Kick + Right Hook)	1	2:30
2017-11-04	Loss	(Thailand) Sitthichai Sitsongpeenong	Wu Lin Feng 2017: Yi Long VS Sitthichai	Kunming, China	KO (Left High Kick)	2	1:10
For the Wu Lin Feng World Championship (-71 kg).
2017-04-30	Win	(Japan) Yoshida	Wu Xing Feng Yun	Weifang, China	KO	2	
2017-01-14	Win	(Netherlands) Marco Piqué	Wu Lin Feng World Kickboxing Championship 2017	Zhengzhou, China	Decision	3	3:00
2016-11-05	Win	(Thailand) Buakaw Banchamek	Wu Lin Feng 2016: Fight of the Century 2	Nanjing, China	Decision	3	3:00
Wins the Wu Lin Feng World Championship.
2016-09-10	Win	(Japan) Masato Uchiyama	Wu Lin Feng 2016: World Kickboxing Championship in Shenzhen	Shenzhen, China	Decision	3	3:00
2016-08-27	Win	(Australia) Franz Sanchez	Wu Lin Feng 2016: China vs Australia	Sydney, Australia	TKO	1	
2016-04-02	Win	(Germany) Enriko Kehl	Glory of Heroes 1	Shenzhen, China	Decision	3	3:00
2016-01-31	Win	(Japan) Sanchi Kameda	Heroes of Changbai Mountain	Changbai Mountain, Jilin, China	Decision	3	3:00
2016-01-23	Win	(Iran) Seyedisa Alamdarnezam	Wu Lin Feng 2016: World Kickboxing Championship in Shanghai	Shanghai, China	Decision	3	3:00
2015-11-14	Win	(United States) Raul Rodriguez	Wu Lin Feng 2015: China VS USA	Las Vegas, US	KO	2	
2015-08-22	Win	(Malaysia) Kai Chee	2015 in Wu Lin Feng	Xiamen, China	KO	2	
2015-08-08	Win	(Thailand)	2015 in Wu Lin Feng	Chengdu, China	Decision	3	3:00
2015-07-11	Win	(Japan) Koizumi Ryu	2015 in Wu Lin Feng	Zhumadian, China	Decision	3	3:00
2015-06-06	Loss	(Thailand) Buakaw Banchamek	Wu Lin Feng 2015 –Fight of the Century	Jiyuan, China	Decision	3	3:00
For the Wu Lin Feng World Championship.
2015-04-18	Loss	(Germany) Leo Bönniger	2015 in Wu Lin Feng	Germany	Decision	3	3:00
2015-04-16	Win	(Thailand)	2015 in Wu Lin Feng	China	KO	2	
2015-03-07	Win	(Portugal) Miguel Varela	2015 in Wu Lin Feng	Zhengzhou, China	Decision	3	3:00
2015-01-31	Draw	(Japan) Yuichiro Nagashima	2015 in Wu Lin Feng	Chongqing, China	Decision	3	3:00
2014-12-31	Win	(Japan) Kimama Okura	2014 in Wu Lin Feng	Yining, China	Decision	3	3:00
2014-12-19	Win	(Thailand) Pettong Leamtanawat	2014 in Wu Lin Feng	Weinan, China	KO	1	
Wins the S-1 Muaythai Super Middleweight World champion.
2014-12-09	Loss	(Thailand) Pettong Leamtanawat	2014 in Wu Lin Feng&King's birthday	Bangkok, Thailand	Decision	3	3:00
2014-09-28	Win	(Japan) Kotaro Mori	2014 in Wu Lin Feng	Hong Kong, China	KO	1	
2014-09-09	Loss	(Japan) Yuichiro Nagashima	2014 in Wu Lin Feng	Khorgos, China	Decision	3	3:00
2014-09-07	Win	(France) Dimitri Mason	2014 in Wu Lin Feng	Karamay, China	Decision	3	3:00
2014-08-19	Win	(Brazil) Jason Ganstantin	2014 in Wu Lin Feng	Jining, China	Decision	3	3:00
2014-08-09	Win	(France) Mohammed Hansen	2014 in Wu Lin Feng	Enshi, China	KO	1	
2014-07-12	Win	(Republic of Ireland) David Brown	2014 in Wu Lin Feng	Dublin, Ireland	KO	3	
2014-05-24	Loss	(Thailand) Sudsakorn Sor Klinmee	Yokkao 9	Xinyang, China	Decision	3	3:00
2014-05-10	Win	(Germany) Ollie Koch	2014 in Wu Lin Feng	Hamburg, Germany	Decision	3	3:00
2014-04-19	Win	(France) Karl Counsell	2014 in Wu Lin Feng	Kunming, China	KO	3	
2014-03-30	Win	(South Korea) Choi Woo-yeong	Kunlun Fight 3	Harbin, China	Decision	3	3:00
2014-03-07	Win	(Japan)	2014 in Wu Lin Feng	Hangzhou, China	KO	1	
2014-02-08	Win	(Brazil) Jackson Alves	2014 in Wu Lin Feng	Anyang, China	Decision	3	3:00
2014-01-19	Win	(Thailand)	2014 in Wu Lin Feng	Hefei, China	KO	2	
2014-01-18	Win	(United States) Adrien Grotte	2014 in Wu Lin Feng	Xiangyang, China	KO	1	
2013-11-22	Win	(South Africa) Mike	2013 in Wu Lin Feng	Langfang, China	KO	1	
2013-11-03	Win	(United States) Cyrus Washington	2013 in Wu Lin Feng	Las Vegas, USA	Decision	3	3:00
2013-10-18	Win	(Japan) Nishizuka Hirohito	2013 in Wu Lin Feng	Luoyang, China	KO	2	
2013-09-07	Win	(Brazil) Paul	2013 in Wu Lin Feng	Hami, China	KO	1	
2013-08-24	Win	(Thailand)	2013 in Wu Lin Feng	Zhengzhou, China	KO	3	
2013-06-18	Win	(Thailand) Jamnian Srikam	2013 in Wu Lin Feng	Dubai, UAE	KO	1	
2013-05-25	Loss	(Brazil) Jackson	2013 in Wu Lin Feng	Wuhu, China	Decision	3	3:00
2013-04-28	Win	(Japan) Nishizuka Hirohito	2013 in Wu Lin Feng	Luoyang, China	Decision	3	3:00
2013-02-08	Win	(South Korea) Young Jin Min	Wu Lin Feng VS Khan	Seoul, South Korea	KO	2	
2012-12-31	Win	(Thailand) Saenchainoi Pumphanmuang	2012 in Wu Lin Feng	Beijing, China	Decision	3	3:00
2012-11-12	Loss	(United States) Josh Pickthall	2012 in Wu Lin Feng	Las Vegas, United States	KO	2	
2012-10-20	Win	(New Zealand) Jordan Tai	2012 in Wu Lin Feng	Henan, China	Decision	3	3:00
2012-06-24	Win	(New Zealand) Brad Riddell	2012 in Wu Lin Feng	Henan, China	Decision	3	3:00
Wins the CIK World Champion.
2012-05-28	Win	(Germany) Florian Kröger	2012 in Wu Lin Feng	Hamburg, Germany	Ex.R Decision	4	3:00
2012-05-18	Win	(Japan) Nkata	2012 in Wu Lin Feng	Anhui, China	Decision	3	3:00
2012-04-03	Loss	(Japan) Masato Uchiyama	2012 in Wu Lin Feng	Henan, China	Decision	3	3:00
2012-01-14	Win	(New Zealand) Brad Dell	2012 in Wu Lin Feng	Henan, China	Decision	3	3:00
2011-12-20	Win	(Japan) Hideaki Yoshikawa	2011 in Wu Lin Feng	China	Decision	3	3:00
2011-12-02	Loss	(New Zealand) Brad Riddell	2011 in Wu Lin Feng	Henan, China	Decision	3	3:00
2011-11-12	Win	(United States) Sin Ili	2011 in Wu Lin Feng	Las Vegas, United States	KO	2	
2011-10-15	Win	(New Zealand)	2011 in Wu Lin Feng	Kuala Lumpur, Malaysia	Decision	3	3:00
2011-08-16	Win	(Japan) Yoshi Jukichi	2011 in Wu Lin Feng	China	KO	1	
2011-06-14	Win	(United States) Keith Petit	2011 in Wu Lin Feng China VS USA	China	KO	2	
2011-05-20	Win	(Thailand)	2011 in Wu Lin Feng	China	KO	1	
2010-11-14	Loss	(United States) Adrien Grotte	2010 in Wu Lin Feng	Las Vegas, United States	KO	2	
2010-11-07	Win	(China) Pan Guoshui	2010 in Wu Lin Feng	China	Decision	3	3:00
2010-08-14	Win	(Thailand) Sonchai Me.mai	2010 in Wu Lin Feng	China	Decision	3	3:00
2010-06-19	Win	(Thailand) Sonchai Me.mai	2010 in Wu Lin Feng	China	Decision	3	3:00
2010-05-01	Win	(United States) David Hayes	2010 in Wu Lin Feng	Henan, China	Decision	3	3:00
2009-12-31	Win	(Russia) Gustin Turi	2009 in Wu Lin Feng	China	Decision	3	3:00
2009-11	Win	(China) Jin Hongyu	2009 in Wu Lin Feng	China	Decision	5	2:00
2009-10	Win	(China) Zhang Chong	2009 in Wu Lin Feng	China	Decision	5	2:00
2009-09	Win	(Russia) Gantavlov Anton	2009 in Wu Lin Feng	China	Decision	5	2:00
2009-09	Win	(China) Wang Yanxin	2009 in Wu Lin Feng	China	Decision	5	2:00
2009-09	Win	(China) Yang Zhenbin	2009 in Wu Lin Feng	China	Decision	5	2:00
2009-08	Win	(China) Hao Zuoqiong	2009 in Wu Lin Feng	China	Decision	5	2:00
2009-08	Win	(China) Hou Kuizhong	2009 in Wu Lin Feng	China	Decision	5	2:00
2009-07-18	Win	(China) Wang Zhiliang	2009 in Wu Lin Feng	China	Decision	5	2:00
Legend: Win Loss Draw/no contest Notes

== Filmography ==
=== Films ===
- Copper Skin Iron Bone (2019)
- Chinatown War (2019)
- Chinese Peacekeeping Forces (2019)
- Captain America : Civil War (2016)
- Boxing Champion (2017)
- The Dream of My Director (2015)
