= Timur Nadrov =

Russian kickboxer (born 1995)

- Born: Timur Rasikhovich Nadrov; January 3, 1995 (age 31); Moscow, Russia
- Native name: Тимур Расихович Надров
- Height: 1.67 m (5 ft 5 1/2 in)
- Weight: 60 kg (130 lb; 9.4 st)
- Style: Kickboxing
- Stance: Orthodox
- Fighting out of: Moscow, Russia
- Team: Club Vympel
- Years active: 2014 - present

Professional boxing record
- Total: 2
- Wins: 2
- By knockout: 2
- Losses: 0

Kickboxing record
- Total: 17
- Wins: 16
- By knockout: 7
- Losses: 1

Other information
- Boxing record from BoxRec

Timur Rasikhovich Nadrov (born January 3, 1995) is a Russian professional boxer and kickboxer.

== Career ==
On September 9, 2015, Nadrov faced Alberto Monteiro for the vacant WKF World -60 kg title at Battle of Champions 8 in Valdivostok, Russia. Nadrov won the fight by technical knockout in the seventh round.

On February 18, 2017, Nadrov faced Sergio Wielzen for the W5 World -60 kg title at W5 Grand Prix KITEK XXXIX. He won by fifth-round knockout with a series of punches.

== Titles and accomplishments ==
=== Professional ===
- World version W5
  - 2017 W5 World -60 kg Champion
- World Kickboxing Federation
  - 2015 WKF World -60 kg Champion
- Russian Kickboxing Federation
  - 2015 Russian K-1 -60 kg Champion
    - Two successful title defenses

=== Amateur ===
- World Association of Kickboxing Organizations
  - 2017 WAKO World Championships K-1 -60 kg (gold)
  - 2016 WAKO European Championships K-1 -60 kg (gold)
  - 2015 WAKO World Championships K-1 -60 kg (bronze)
  - 2013 WAKO European Championships Junior K-1 -57 kg (gold)
  - 2013 WAKO World Championships Junior K-1 -54 kg (silver)
  - 2011 WAKO European Championships Young Junior Full-Contact -51 kg (gold)

== Kickboxing record ==
Professional Kickboxing Record
16 Wins (7 (T)KO's), 1 Loss
Date	Result	Opponent	Event	Location	Method	Round	Time
2018-07-29	Win	(Russia) Ibragim Abdulmedzhidov		Russia	Decision (Unanimous)	5	3:00
Defends Russian Federation K-1 -60kg Title
2018-05-18	Win	(Russia) Ramadan Baskanov		Tomsk, Russia	Decision	5	3:00
Defends Russian Federation K-1 -60kg Title
2017-10-07	Win	(China) Chen Wende	ACB KB 11 / Wu Lin Feng	Zhengzhou, China	Decision (Unanimous)	3	3:00
2017-02-18	Win	(Suriname) Sergio Wielzen	W5 Grand Prix KITEK XXXIX	Moscow, Russia	TKO (Ref Stoppage/Right Hook)	2	
Wins W5 -60 kg World Title
2016-09-16	Win	(Russia) Abdul Ayubov	Strong Russia	Russia	Decision	3	3:00
2016-05-28	Win	(Russia) Igor Grakhov	Strong Russia	Russia	Decision	3	3:00
2016-04-30	Win	(Russia) Magomed Saidov	Legacy	Russia	Decision	3	3:00
2016-02-27	Win	(Russia) Zukhrab Azimov	ACB KB 5: Let's Knock The Winter Out	Orel, Russia	Decision (Unanimous)	3	3:00
2015-09-04	Win	(Spain) Alberto Simon Montero	Battle of Champions 8	Vladivostok, Russia	TKO (Low kicks)	7	
Wins WKF World -60kg Title
2015-07-11	Win	(Russia) Sergey Luchenko	12th USSR Martial Arts Championship	Russia	TKO (Knee)		
Wins the vacant Russian Federation K-1 -60kg Title
2015-04-25	Win	(Sweden) Hamza Bougmza	ACB KB 1: Grand Prix Quarter-Finals	Grozny, Russia	Decision	3	3:00
2015-03-13	Win	(Azerbaijan) Zohrab Azimov	Heydar Aliyev Cup	Saint Petersburg, Russia	Decision (Split)	3	3:00
2015-02-16	Win	(Uzbekistan) Hasan Khudoyberdiev	Heydar Aliyev Cup	Podolsk, Russia	KO (Right Hook to the Body)	1	
2014-09-27	Loss	(Greece) Nikos Xysen	Urban Fighters 6	Greece	Decision	3	3:00
2014-09-07	Win	(Russia) Vadim Chasovskikh		Russia	Decision	5	3:00
2014-04-26	Win	(Serbia) Sadic		Voronezh, Vladivostok, Russia	TKO (Corner Stoppage)	2	3:00
2014-02-26	Win	(Russia) Immam Abdullaev	GPRO-16	Moscow, Russia	Decision	3	3:00
Legend: Win Loss Draw/No contest Notes

Amateur Kickboxing Record
Date	Result	Opponent	Event	Location	Method	Round	Time
2017-11-11	Win	(Poland) Michal Krolik	2017 WAKO World Championship, Final	Budapest, Hungary	Decision (3:0)	3	2:00
Wins 2017 WAKO World Championship K-1 -60 kg Gold Medal
2017-11-10	Win	(Slovakia) Thomas Tadlanek	2017 WAKO World Championship, Semi Final	Budapest, Hungary	Decision (3:0)	3	2:00
2017-11-08	Win	(Portugal) Antonio Faria	2017 WAKO World Championship, Quarter Final	Budapest, Hungary	Decision (3:0)	3	2:00
2017-04-05	Win	(Russia) Temirlan Bekmurazev	2016 Russia Championship, Final	Russia	Decision	3	2:00
2017-04-05	Win	(Russia) Argishti Mkrtumyan	2016 Russia Championship, Semi Final	Russia	Decision	3	2:00
2016-10-29	Win	(Poland) Michal Krolik	2016 WAKO European Championship, Final	Maribor, Slovenia	Decision (3:0)	3	2:00
Wins 2016 WAKO European Championship K-1 -60 kg Gold Medal
2016-10-28	Win	(France) Julien Come	2016 WAKO European Championship, Semifinals	Maribor, Slovenia	Decision (3:0)	3	2:00
2016-10-27	Win	(Turkey) Oguz Sever	2016 WAKO European Championship, Quarterfinals	Maribor, Slovenia	Decision (3:0)	3	2:00
2015-10-30	Loss	(Kazakhstan) Chingiskhan Tlemissov	2015 WAKO World Championship, Semi Final	Belgrade, Serbia	Decision (Split)	3	3:00
Wins 2015 WAKO World Championship K-1 -60 kg Bronze Medal
2015-10-29	Win	(Poland) Michal Krolik	2015 WAKO World Championship, Quarter Final	Belgrade, Serbia	KO (Knee to the body)	3	
2015-10-28	Win	(Morocco) Salaheddine Nait-Lghazi	2015 WAKO World Championship, First Round	Belgrade, Serbia	KO	3	
2014-04-04	Win	(Russia) Temirlan Bekmurzaev		Grozny, Russia	Decision	3	3:00
2013-09-	Win	(Russia) Bolat Kochaa	2013 WAKO European Championship, Final	Krynica-Zdrój, Poland			
Wins 2013 WAKO European Championship Junior K-1 -57 kg Gold Medal
2013-09-	Win	(Poland) Marcin Kalinski	2013 WAKO European Championship, Semifinals	Krynica-Zdrój, Poland			
2013-09-	Win	(Belarus) Kiryl Zazayeu	2013 WAKO European Championship, Quarterfinals	Krynica-Zdrój, Poland			
2013-09-	Win	(Lithuania) Dainius Džiugas	2013 WAKO European Championship, First Round	Krynica-Zdrój, Poland			
2012-09-	Loss	(Portugal) Rui Botelho	2012 WAKO World Championship, Final	Bratislava, Slovakia			
Wins 2013 WAKO European Championship Junior K-1 -54 kg Silver Medal
Legend: Win Loss Draw/No contest Notes

== Professional Boxing record ==
2 fights	2 wins	0 losses
By knockout	2	0

No.	Result	Record	Opponent	Type	Round, time	Date	Location	Notes
2	Win	2–0	Islomjon Salokhidinov	TKO	6 (6), 2:15	30 Oct 2019	Korston Club, Moscow, Russia	
1	Win	1–0	Lazizbek Uzokov	TKO	1 (4), 2:14	24 Jul 2019	Korston Club, Moscow, Russia	

== See also ==
- List of male kickboxers
