= 2016 in Glory of Heroes =

Information
- First date: April 2
- Last date: December 17

Events
- Total events: 11

Fights

Chronology
| N/A | 2016 in Glory of Heroes | 2017 in Glory of Heroes |

Glory of Heroes by Wanmingyang Media was announced on February 18, 2016 The first Glory of Heroes event took place on April 2 in Shenzhen, China.

== List of events ==
| No. | Event | Date | Venue | City |
|---|---|---|---|---|
| 11 | Rise of Heroes 5 | December 17, 2016 | Jiangnan Gymnasium | Nanning, China |
| 10 | Conquest of Heroes | December 2 and 3, 2016 | Jiyuan Basketball Stadium | Jiyuan, Henan, China |
| 09 | Rise of Heroes 4: Europe VS China | November 19, 2016 | Salle Du Midi | Martigny, Switzerland |
| 08 | Rise of Heroes 3 | October 29, 2016 | Changji Gymnasium | Changji, Xinjiang, China |
| 07 | Rise of Heroes 2 | October 15, 2016 | Nanchang Institute of Technology Stadium | Zhangshu, Jiangxi, China |
| 06 | Glory of Heroes 5 | October 1, 2016 | Henan Province Sports Center Stadium | Zhengzhou, China |
| 05 | Rise of Heroes 1 | September 17, 2016 | Chaoyang Stadium | Chaoyang, Liaoning, China |
| 04 | Glory of Heroes 4 | August 6, 2016 | Changzhi Stadium | Changzhi, Shanxi, China |
| 03 | Glory of Heroes 3 | July 2, 2016 | Jiyuan Basketball Stadium | Jiyuan, Henan, China |
| 02 | Glory of Heroes 2 | May 7, 2016 | Bao'an Stadium | Shenzhen, China |
| 01 | Glory of Heroes 1 | April 2, 2016 | Bao'an Stadium | Shenzhen, China |

== Rise of Heroes 5 ==
Rise of Heroes 5
- Promotion: Glory of Heroes
- Date: December 17, 2016
- Venue: Jiangnan Gymnasium
- City: Nanning, China

Event chronology
| Rise of Heroes 4: Europe VS China | Rise of Heroes 5 | Rise of Heroes 6 |

Rise of Heroes 5 was a kickboxing event held on December 17, 2016 at the Jiangnan Gymnasium in Nanning, China.

=== Results ===
Fight Card
| Weight Class | | | | Method | Round | Time | Notes |
|---|---|---|---|---|---|---|---|
| Kickboxing - 65kg | (China) Lu Jun | def. | (New Zealand) Jack Walker | Decision (Unanimous) | 3 | 3:00 |
| Kickboxing - 57kg | (Albania) Nick Hysen | def. | (China) Xu Luzhe | Decision (Unanimous) | 3 | 3:00 |
| Kickboxing - 60kg | (Spain) Sergio | def. | (China) Kong Long | Decision (Unanimous) | 3 | 3:00 |
| Kickboxing - 75kg | (China) Guo Xichuang | def. | (Russia) Ofori | KO | 3 |
| Kickboxing - Woman 54kg | (China) Ren Kailin | def. | (Thailand) Alyssa | KO | 3 |
| Kickboxing - 65kg | (China) Liu Yong | def. | (Russia) Azeri | Decision (Unanimous) | 3 | 3:00 |
| Kickboxing - 67kg | (China) Liu Xiangming | def. | (Thailand) Manaowan Sitsongpeenong | Decision (Unanimous) | 3 | 3:00 |
| Kickboxing - 63kg | (China) Yun Qi | def. | (Philippines) Jay Marrube | TKO | 3 | 1:49 |
| Kickboxing - 67kg | (China) Guo Weidong | def. | (Thailand) Atthaphon | KO | 1 |
| Kickboxing - 68kg | (Belgium) Muhammad Khanov | def. | (China) Tie Yinghua | Decision (Split) | 3 | 3:00 |
| Kickboxing - 67kg | (China) Qiu Jianliang | def. | (Romania) Adrian Maxim | Decision (Unanimous) | 3 | 3:00 |
| Kickboxing - 75kg | (China) Liu Mingzhi | def. | (Russia) Artur Ibrahimovic | Decision (Unanimous) | 3 | 3:00 |
| Kickboxing - 88kg | (Ukraine) Yurii Zubchuk | def. | (China) Guo Qiang | Decision (Unanimous) | 3 | 3:00 |
| Kickboxing - 75kg | (China) Zhang Heng | def. | (Spain) Juan Ernesto Rubens | | 3 | 3:00 |
| Kickboxing - 60kg | (China) Chen Huan | def. | (Thailand) Xilipeng | Decision (Unanimous) | 3 | 3:00 |

== Conquest of Heroes ==
Conquest of Heroes
- Promotion: Glory of Heroes
- Date: December 2 and 3, 2016
- Venue: Jiyuan Basketball Stadium
- City: Jiyuan, Henan, China

Event chronology
| N/A | Conquest of Heroes | Conquest of Heroes: China vs New Zealand |

Conquest of Heroes was a MMA event held on December 2 and 3, 2016 at the Jiyuan Basketball Stadium Jiyuan, Henan, China. January 15, 2017 every Sunday 21:50 Shenzhen Television broadcast.

=== Results ===
Fight Card Dec 2
| Weight Class | | | | Method | Round | Time | Notes |
|---|---|---|---|---|---|---|---|
| MMA - 57kg | (China) Yin Shuai | def. | (Tajikistan) Temur Khamrokulov | Submission (Rear Naked Choke) | 2 | 2:35 |
| MMA - 61kg | (China) Shi Xiaoyu | def. | (Russia) Dmitry Budnikov | Submission (Rear Naked Choke) | 2 |
| MMA - 57kg | (China) Chen Rui | def. | (Ukraine) Alexander Krupenkin | Decision (Unanimous) | 3 | 5:00 |
| MMA - 70kg | (Georgia (country)) Tamaz Bochorishvili | def. | (China) Wang Tanzhao | Submission (Rear Naked Choke) | 1 |
| MMA - 57kg | (Georgia (country)) Akaki Khorava | def. | (China) Lin Cheng | KO | 1 |
| MMA - 70kg | (China) Lang Tinggui | def. | (Ukraine) Roman Panteley | Submission (Triangle choke) | 3 |
| MMA - 105kg | (China) Hu Yaozong | def. | (Uzbekistan) Abror Yakhyaev | TKO (Referee stops) | 2 |
| MMA - 61kg | (Russia) Vadim Buseev | def. | (China) Xiao Long | Decision (Unanimous) | 3 | 5:00 |
| MMA - 57kg | (China) Hu Yong | def. | (Russia) Sirazhutdin Akhmedrabadanov | TKO (Corner stop) | 2 |
| MMA - 66kg | (Russia) Zamir Aripshev | def. | (China) Ma Teng | Decision (Unanimous) | 3 | 5:00 |
| MMA - 66kg | (Hungary) Sirojiddin Manuchehri | def. | (China) Ayijiake Akenbieke | Decision (Unanimous) | 3 | 5:00 |
| MMA - 61kg | (China) He Jinhao | def. | (Russia) Emil Abasov | TKO (High kick) | 2 |
| MMA - 66kg | (China) Jiang Zexian | def. | (Japan) Shimizu Naoto | Decision (Unanimous) | 3 | 5:00 |
| MMA - Woman 52kg | (China) Wang Xue | def. | (Egypt) Omnia Gamal | TKO (Punches) | 1 | 0:28 |
| MMA - 61kg | (China) Cheng Zhao | def. | (Argentina) Arif Lazart | TKO | 3 |
| MMA - 66kg | (China) Wuliji Buren | def. | (Uzbekistan) Sirozhiddin Eshanbaev | Submission (Rear Naked Choke) | 2 |
| MMA - 84kg | (Kazakhstan) Ilyar Iminov | def. | (China) Shun Feng | Submission (guillotine choke) | 1 | 0:20 |
| MMA - 61kg | (Russia) Gadzhi Magomedov | def. | (China) Jia Erken | TKO (Punches) | 3 |
| MMA - 57kg | (Ukraine) Teimur Rahimov | def. | (China) Lu Zhengyong | TKO | 2 | 3:45 |
| MMA - 66kg | (Russia) Kamil Zaynutdinov | def. | (China) Jiahefu Wuziazibieke | Submission | 1 |
| MMA - 73kg | (Georgia (country)) Raul Tutarauli | def. | (China) Bao Yinchang | Decision (Unanimous) | 3 | 5:00 |
| MMA - 61kg | (Russia) Adam Akhmadov | def. | (China) Duman Yerjiang | Decision (Unanimous) | 3 | 5:00 |
Fight Card Dec 3
| Weight Class | | | | Method | Round | Time | Notes |
| MMA - 61kg | (China) Wang Yayong | def. | (Armenia) Albert Ghazaryan | Submission (Armbar) | 1 | 4:41 |
| MMA - 66kg | (China) Bao Yinna | def. | (Kazakhstan) Bektursyn Syrym | Submission | 2 |
| MMA - 61kg | (China) Wang Jizheng | def. | (Tajikistan) Firuz Abdulloev | Submission (Rear Naked Choke) | 2 | 3:34 |
| MMA - 61kg | (Russia) Egor Sinyapkin | def. | (China) Qing Long | Decision (Unanimous) | 3 | 5:00 |
| MMA - Woman 56kg | (China) Meng Bo | def. | (Egypt) Ola Ahmed | Submission (Armbar) | 1 |
| MMA - 61kg | (China) Lu Jianbo | def. | (Russia) Magomed Ismailov | Decision (Unanimous) | 3 | 5:00 |
| MMA - 61kg | (Russia) Ayub Labazanov | def. | (China) Yue Zhengzheng | TKO | 1 |
| MMA - 66kg | (Ukraine) Yurii Bosyi | def. | (China) Wang Daoyuan | Submission | 1 |
| MMA - 61kg | (China) Wang Shuo | def. | (Kazakhstan) Abylay Nagymzhanov | TKO | 1 |
| MMA - 61kg | (Ukraine) Ivan Vulchin | def. | (China) Xu Kewei | Submission | 1 |
| MMA - 61kg | (Uzbekistan) Sardor Sadykov | def. | (China) Xu Xiaochen | TKO (Referee stops) | 1 | 1:24 |
| MMA - 75kg | (New Zealand) Brad Riddell | def. | (China) Ye Erruer | TKO (Punches) | 2 |
| MMA - 66kg | (China) Cui Liucai | def. | (Egypt) Ahmed Gamal Mohamed Mabrouk | Submission (Armbar) | 1 | 4:46 |
| MMA - 61kg | (China) Yang Sen | def. | (Japan) Mizuki Sakamoto | Submission (Rear Naked Choke) | 2 |
| MMA - Woman 52kg | (China) Huang Feier | def. | (Kazakhstan) Nazira Mussagaliyeva | Submission (Armbar) | 1 | 0:28 |
| MMA - 65kg | (China) Ji Xian | def. | (Russia) Magomed Imanaliev | Submission (Triangle choke) | 1 | 1:11 |
| MMA - 105kg | (China) Liu Wenbo | def. | (Russia) Aleksey Kiser | TKO | 1 |
| MMA - 61kg | (Russia) Murad Magomedov | def. | (China) Li Muha | TKO | 3 |
| MMA - 68kg | (China) He Nannan | def. | (Tajikistan) Asror Olimshoev | TKO | 1 | 0:58 |
| MMA - 72kg | (China) Wang Guan | def. | (Tajikistan) Bakhtibek Khojaev | TKO | 1 | 3:05 |
| MMA - 61kg | (China) Zhao Yafei | def. | (Russia) Murad Ibragimov | Decision (Unanimous) | 3 | 5:00 |
| MMA - 66kg | (Kazakhstan) Bahadur Vilyamusov | def. | (China) Zhang Jiacai | TKO (Punches) | 1 | 0:06 |

== Rise of Heroes 4: Europe VS China ==
Rise of Heroes 4: Europe VS China
- Promotion: Glory of Heroes
- Date: November 19, 2016
- Venue: Salle Du Midi
- City: Martigny, Switzerland

Event chronology
| Rise of Heroes 3 | Rise of Heroes 4: Europe VS China | Rise of Heroes 5 |

Rise of Heroes 4 was a kickboxing event held on November 19, 2016 at the Salle Du Midi in Martigny, Switzerland.

=== Results ===
Fight Card
| Weight Class | | | | Method | Round | Time | Notes |
|---|---|---|---|---|---|---|---|
| Kickboxing – 63.5kg | (Switzerland) Nabio TESFAI | def. | (China) Lei Penghui | Decision (Unanimous) | 3 | 3:00 |
| Kickboxing – 65kg | (Kosovo) Liridon OSMANAJ | def. | (China) Guo Weidong | Decision (Unanimous) | 3 | 3:00 |
| Kickboxing – 67kg | (China) Qiu Jianliang | def. | (Switzerland) Sebastien FLEURY | KO (Right High Kick) | 1 |
| Kickboxing – 71kg | (Portugal) Ricardo LUIZ | def. | (China) Zhao Yan | Decision (Unanimous) | 3 | 3:00 |
| Kickboxing –73kg | (France) Jimmy VIENOT | def. | (China) Hu Yafei | TKO (Abandon) | 1 |
| Kickboxing –Woman 59kg | (China) Meng Bo | def. | (Switzerland) Janique AVANTHAY | TKO (referee stop) | 3 |
| Kickboxing –57kg | (Switzerland) Milan Iseli | def. | (China) Huo Xiaolong | Decision (Unanimous) | 3 | 3:00 |
| Kickboxing –72.5kg | (Albania) Qendrim BAJRAMI | def. | (China) Chen Yinlei | KO (Knee) | 1 |
| Kickboxing –75kg | (France) Raphaël Llodra | def. | (China) Wang Anying | KO (Knee) | 2 |
| Kickboxing –70kg | (China) Hao Shengbin | def. | (Switzerland) Sami LAMIRI | Decision (Unanimous) | 3 | 3:00 |

== Rise of Heroes 3 ==
Rise of Heroes 3
- Promotion: Glory of Heroes
- Date: October 29, 2016
- Venue: Changji Gymnasium
- City: Changji, Xinjiang, China

Event chronology
| Rise of Heroes 2 | Rise of Heroes 3 | Rise of Heroes 4: Europe VS China |

Rise of Heroes 3 was a kickboxing event held on October 29, 2016 at the Changji Gymnasium in Changji, Xinjiang, China.

=== Results ===
Fight Card
| Weight Class | | | | Method | Round | Time | Notes |
|---|---|---|---|---|---|---|---|
| Kickboxing – 63kg | (Romania) Cristian Spetcu | def. | (China) Fang Feida | Decision (Unanimous) | 3 | 3:00 | 63kg Tournament Semifinals |
| Kickboxing – 63kg | (China) Wang Wanli | def. | (Spain) Christian Gruber | Decision (Unanimous) | 3 | 3:00 | 63kg Tournament Semifinals |
| Kickboxing – 65kg | (China) Fu Qingnan | def. | (New Zealand) Terenki Guade | Decision (Unanimous) | 3 | 3:00 | 65kg Tournament Semifinals |
| Kickboxing – 65kg | (Spain) Menuel Ferendex | def. | (China) Liu Xiangming | TKO (Knee) | 1 | | 65kg Tournament Semifinals |
| Kickboxing – 75kg | (China) Huang Zhenyou | def. | (Portugal) Adelino Diogo | Decision (Unanimous) | 3 | 3:00 | 75kg Tournament Semifinals |
| Kickboxing – 75kg | (Brazil) Matheus Pereira | def. | (China) Guo Xichuang | TKO | 3 | | 75kg Tournament Semifinals |
| Kickboxing – 80kg | (China) Li Hui | def. | (Spain) Imenol Gzecia | Decision (Unanimous) | 3 | 3:00 | 80kg Tournament Semifinals |
| Kickboxing – 80kg | (Belarus) Sviryd Alieksendr | def. | (China) Zhang Zhan | Decision (Unanimous) | 3 | 3:00 | 80kg Tournament Semifinals |
| Kickboxing – 63kg | (Romania) Cristian Spetcu | def. | (China) Wang Wanli | TKO | 2 | | 63kg Tournament finals |
| Kickboxing – 65kg | (China) Fu Qingnan | def. | (Spain) Menuel Ferendex | Decision (Unanimous) | 3 | 3:00 | 65kg Tournament finals |
| Kickboxing – 75kg | (Brazil) Matheus Pereira | def. | (China) Huang Zhenyou | TKO | 1 | | 75kg Tournament finals |
| Kickboxing – 80kg | (China) Li Hui | def. | (Belarus) Sviryd Alieksendr | TKO | 1 | 2:48 | 80kg Tournament finals |
| Kickboxing – 68kg | (China) Alimu | vs. | (Thailand) Klanog | | | | Superfight |
| Kickboxing – 63kg | (China) Wei Rui | def. | (Thailand) Piyawong Kaliku | TKO (Left Hook/Referee Stoppage) | 2 | 1:24 | Superfight |
| Kickboxing – 68kg | (China) Yang Zhuo | def. | (Greece) Socratis Kerpatsi | TKO | 1 | | Superfight |
| Kickboxing – 63kg | (Thailand) Tuengphan Apinon | def. | (China) Kong long | TKO (Cuts/Doctor stopped) | 1 | 0:45 | Superfight |
| Kickboxing – 68kg | (China) Tie Yinghua | def. | (Thailand) Tepthanee Winai | Decision (Unanimous) | 3 | 3:00 | Superfight |

== Rise of Heroes 2 ==
Rise of Heroes 2
- Promotion: Glory of Heroes
- Date: October 15, 2016
- Venue: Nanchang Institute of Technology Stadium
- City: Zhangshu, Jiangxi, China

Event chronology
| Rise of Heroes 1 | Rise of Heroes 2 | Rise of Heroes 3 |

Rise of Heroes 2 was a kickboxing event held on October 15, 2016 at the Nanchang Institute of Technology Stadium in Zhangshu, Jiangxi, China.

=== Results ===
Fight Card
| Weight Class | | | | Method | Round | Time | Notes |
|---|---|---|---|---|---|---|---|
| Kickboxing – 57kg | (Russia) Astemir Borsov | def. | (China) Liu Xiaoyang | Decision (Unanimous) | 3 | 3:00 | 57kg Tournament Semifinals |
| Kickboxing – 57kg | (China) Li Xiang | def. | (Portugal) Barrosmendes Marioluismr | Decision (Unanimous) | 3 | 3:00 | 57kg Tournament Semifinals |
| Kickboxing – 60kg | (Thailand) Kaeongam Narongwut | def. | (China) Dong Jian | Decision (Unanimous) | 3 | 3:00 | 60kg Tournament Semifinals |
| Kickboxing – 60kg | (China) Yuan Ya | def. | (Spain) Lamtabonyizcaino Javirrmr | Decision (Unanimous) | 3 | 3:00 | 60kg Tournament Semifinals |
| Kickboxing – 68kg | (Thailand) Sukchaicbot | def. | (China) Wang Tengyue | TKO | 1 | | 68kg Tournament Semifinals |
| Kickboxing – 68kg | (Russia) Bmiev Arbi | def. | (China) Ying Pengfei | Decision (Unanimous) | 3 | 3:00 | 68kg Tournament Semifinals |
| Kickboxing – 71kg | (China) Zhao Chunyang | def. | (Spain) Farimagarcia Miguel | Decision (Unanimous) | 3 | 3:00 | 71kg Tournament Semifinals |
| Kickboxing – 71kg | (China) Hu Yafei | def. | (Iran) Fathi Amirhosseinmr | Decision (Unanimous) | 3 | 3:00 | 71kg Tournament Semifinals |
| Kickboxing – 72kg | (China) Hao Shengbin | def. | (United Kingdom) Ricewondepps Nathanoliver | Decision (Unanimous) | 3 | 3:00 | Superfight |
| Kickboxing – Woman 56kg | (Canada) Ashley Nichols | def. | (China) Gong Yanli | Decision (Unanimous) | 3 | 3:00 | Superfight |
| Kickboxing – 63kg | (China) Deng Zeqi | def. | (Spain) Miguelllobregat Cristian | TKO | 1 | | Superfight |
| Kickboxing – 86kg | (Netherlands) Bayrak Ertugrul | def. | (China) Guo Qiang | TKO | 3 | | Superfight |
| Kickboxing – Woman 52kg | (China) Wang Xue | def. | (Spain) Cristina Morales | Decision (Unanimous) | 3 | 3:00 | Superfight |
| Kickboxing – 57kg | (Russia) Astemir Borsov | def. | (China) Li Xiang | TKO | 1 | | 57kg Tournament finals |
| Kickboxing – 60kg | (Thailand) Kaeongam Narongwut | def. | (China) Yuan Ya | Decision (Unanimous) | 3 | 3:00 | 60kg Tournament finals |
| Kickboxing – 68kg | (Thailand) Sukchaicbot | def. | (Russia) Bmiev Arbi | Decision (Unanimous) | 3 | 3:00 | 68kg Tournament finals |
| Kickboxing – 71kg | (China) Hu Yafei | def. | (China) Zhao Chunyang | TKO | 2 | | 71kg Tournament finals |

== Glory of Heroes 5 ==
Glory of Heroes 5
- Promotion: Glory of Heroes
- Date: October 1, 2016
- Venue: Henan Province Sports Center Stadium
- City: Zhengzhou, China

Event chronology
| Glory of Heroes 4 | Glory of Heroes 5 | Glory of Heroes 6 |

Glory of Heroes 5 was a kickboxing event held on October 1, 2016 at the Henan Province Sports Center Stadium in Zhengzhou, China.

=== Results ===
Fight Card
| Weight Class | | | | Method | Round | Time | Notes |
|---|---|---|---|---|---|---|---|
| Kickboxing - 70kg | (China) Zhang Junwei | def. | (Thailand) Sonchai Wutthikrai | TKO | 1 |
| MMA - 72kg | (China) He Nannan | def. | (Georgia (country)) Shota Akulashvili | Submission | 2 |
| MMA - 66kg | (Spain) Carlos Eduardo de Azevedo | def. | (China) Ji Xian | Disqualification | 1 |
| MMA - 64kg | (China) Cui Liucai | def. | (Ukraine) Sergei Sokol | Submission | 2 |
| Kickboxing – 60kg | (Thailand) Thanonchai Tanagorngym | def. | (China) Kong Long | Decision (Unanimous) | 3 | 3:00 |
| Kickboxing – 85kg | (Nigeria) Israel Adesanya | def. | (Romania) Bogdan Stoica | TKO (left body kick) | 2 |
| Kickboxing – 67kg | (China) Qiu Jianliang | def. | (Morocco) Ilias Bulaid | Decision (Unanimous) | 3 | 3:00 |
| Kickboxing – 68kg | (Thailand) Kem Sitsongpeenong | def. | (China) Jixiang Adai | Decision (Unanimous) | 3 | 3:00 |
| Kickboxing – 63kg | (China) Wei Rui | def. | (Thailand) Somchai Lueamlam | TKO | 3 |
| Kickboxing – 61kg | (China) Jin Ying | def. | (Thailand) Jakkaphan Sompak | TKO | 3 |
| Kickboxing – 67kg | (China) Yang Zhuo | def. | (Angola) Luis Passos | Decision (Unanimous) | 3 | 3:00 |
| Kickboxing – 72kg | (China) Jiao Fukai | def. | (Caribbean Netherlands) Brown Pinas | Decision (Unanimous) | 3 | 3:00 |
| Kickboxing – 68kg | (China) Lu Jianbo | def. | (Italy) Federico Pacini | Decision (Unanimous) | 3 | 3:00 |

== Rise of Heroes 1 ==
Rise of Heroes 1
- Promotion: Glory of Heroes
- Date: September 17, 2016
- Venue: Chaoyang Stadium
- City: Chaoyang, Liaoning, China

Event chronology
| N/A | Rise of Heroes 1 | Rise of Heroes 2 |

Rise of Heroes 1 was a kickboxing event held on September 17, 2016 at the Chaoyang Stadium in Chaoyang, Liaoning, China.

=== Results ===
Fight Card
| Weight Class | | | | Method | Round | Time | Notes |
|---|---|---|---|---|---|---|---|
| Kickboxing – 57kg | (China) Wang Junguang | def. | (Thailand) Thanapon | TKO | 2 | | 57kg Tournament Semifinals |
| Kickboxing – 57kg | (China) Feng Tianhao | def. | (France) Elias Mahmoudi | Decision (Unanimous) | 3 | 3:00 | 57kg Tournament Semifinals |
| Kickboxing – 60kg | (China) Yun Qi | def. | (Moldova) Dmitrii Sîrbu | Ex. R Decision (Unanimous) | 4 | 3:00 | 60kg Tournament Semifinals |
| Kickboxing – 60kg | (China) Feng Liang | def. | (Russia) Sergei Kurilchenko | Decision (Unanimous) | 3 | 3:00 | 60kg Tournament Semifinals |
| Kickboxing – 68kg | (Thailand) Rungthiwa Kueabram | def. | (China) Lu Jianbo | Decision (Unanimous) | 3 | 3:00 | 68kg Tournament Semifinals |
| Kickboxing – 68kg | (Spain) Aissam Chadid | def. | (China) Zhong Weipeng | Decision (Unanimous) | 3 | 3:00 | 68kg Tournament Semifinals |
| Kickboxing – 71kg | (Portugal) Luiz Perreira | def. | (China) Zhou Tao | TKO | 3 | | 71kg Tournament Semifinals |
| Kickboxing – 71kg | (Germany) Talha Tunc | def. | (China) Li Zikai | Decision (Unanimous) | 3 | 3:00 | 71kg Tournament Semifinals |
| Kickboxing – 63kg | (China) Wei Rui | def. | (Belarus) Maksim Petkevich | Ex.Round Unanimous Decision | 4 | 3:00 | Superfight |
| Kickboxing – 57kg | (China) Wang Junguang | def. | (China) Feng Tianhao | Decision (Unanimous) | 3 | 3:00 | 57kg Tournament finals |
| Kickboxing – 88kg | (China) Guo Qiang | def. | (Tonga) Mose Afoa | Decision (Unanimous) | 3 | 3:00 | Superfight |
| Kickboxing – 71kg | (Portugal) Luiz Perreira | def. | (Germany) Talha Tunc | TKO | 1 | | 71kg Tournament finals |
| MMA – 70kg | (China) Wang Guan | def. | (Tajikistan) Kamardin Akhmadbekov | Submission | 1 | | Superfight |
| Kickboxing – 60kg | (China) Feng Liang | def. | (China) Yun Qi | Ex. R Decision (Split) | 4 | 3:00 | 60kg Tournament finals |
| Kickboxing – 85kg | (New Zealand) Israel Adesanya | def. | (France) Romain Falendry | Decision (Unanimous) | 3 | 3:00 | Superfight |
| Kickboxing – 68kg | (Spain) Aissam Chadid | def. | (Thailand) Rungthiwa Kueabram | TKO | 1 | | 68kg Tournament finals |
| Kickboxing – 67kg | (China) Qiu Jianliang | def. | (Netherlands) Melvin Wassing | Decision (Unanimous) | 3 | 3:00 | Superfight |

== Glory of Heroes 4 ==
Glory of Heroes 4
- Promotion: Glory of Heroes
- Date: August 6, 2016
- Venue: Changzhi Stadium
- City: Changzhi, Shanxi, China

Event chronology
| Glory of Heroes 3 | Glory of Heroes 4 | Glory of Heroes 5 |

Glory of Heroes 4 was a kickboxing event held on August 6, 2016 at the Changzhi Stadium in Changzhi, Shanxi, China.

=== Results ===
Fight Card
| Weight Class | | | | Method | Round | Time | Notes |
|---|---|---|---|---|---|---|---|
| Kickboxing – 71 kg | (Iran) Mostafa Hassanvand | def. | (China) Lian Yuxuan | TKO | 1 |
| MMA - 65kg | (China) Ji Xian | def. | (Ukraine) Artem Horodinets | Submission | 1 |
| Kickboxing - 58kg | (China) Wang Junguang | def. | (Thailand) Sankeng | Decision (Unanimous) | 3 | 3:00 |
| Kickboxing - 63kg | (Greece) Stavros Exakoustidis | def. | (China) Deng Zeqi | TKO | 2 |
| Kickboxing - Woman 55kg | (China) Gong Yanli | def. | (Netherlands) Jemyma Betrian | KO | 3 | 2:59 |
| Kickboxing - 63kg | (China) Wei Rui | def. | (Italy) Matteo Taccini | Decision (Unanimous) | 3 | 3:00 |
| Kickboxing - 72kg | (China) Zhang Kaiyin | def. | (Thailand) Saiyok Pumpanmuang | Decision (Unanimous) | 3 | 3:00 |
| Kickboxing - 60kg | (China) Yun Qi | def. | (Belarus) Kruk Yauhen | TKO | 1 |
| Kickboxing - 68kg | (China) Tie Yinghua | def. | (Denmark) Youssef Assouik | Decision (Unanimous) | 3 | 3:00 |
| Kickboxing - 85kg | (New Zealand) Israel Adesanya | def. | (Tunisia) Yousri Belgaroui | Decision (Unanimous) | 3 | 3:00 |
| Kickboxing - 80kg | (France) Cedric Doumbe | def. | (China) Chen Yawei | TKO | 1 |

== Glory of Heroes 3 ==
Glory of Heroes 3
- Promotion: Glory of Heroes
- Date: July 2, 2016
- Venue: Jiyuan Basketball Stadium
- City: Jiyuan, Henan, China

Event chronology
| Glory of Heroes 2 | Glory of Heroes 3 | Glory of Heroes 4 |

Glory of Heroes 3 was a kickboxing event held on July 2, 2016 at the Jiyuan Basketball Stadium in Jiyuan, Henan, China.

=== Results ===
Fight Card
| Weight Class | | | | Method | Round | Time | Notes |
|---|---|---|---|---|---|---|---|
| Kickboxing – 70 kg | (China) Hao Shengbin | def. | (Spain) Antonio Manuel | Split Decision After an Extra Round | 4 | 3:00 |
| Kickboxing – Woman 54 kg | (Ukraine) Viktoria Koroshko | def. | (China) Wang Xue | Decision (Unanimous) | 3 | 3:00 |
| MMA – 66kg | (United States) Kana Hyatt | def. | (China) Getu Hexi | Unknown in the 3rd round | 3 | 3:00 |
| Kickboxing – 71kg | (Thailand) Armin Pumpanmuang Windy Sport | def. | (China) Jiao Fukai | Extra Round TKO | 4 |
| Kickboxing – 63kg | (China) Deng Zeqi | def. | (South Korea) Chan Hyung Lee | Decision (Unanimous) | 3 | 3:00 |
| Kickboxing – 71kg | (Thailand) Sudsakorn Sor Klinmee | def. | (China) Zhao Chunyang | TKO | 2 |
| Kickboxing – 67kg | (China) Qiu Jianliang | def. | (Ukraine) Ruslan Kushnirenko | TKO | 2 |
| Kickboxing – 69kg | (Thailand) Kem Sitsongpeenong | def. | (China) Hu Yafei | Decision (Unanimous) | 3 | 3:00 |
| Kickboxing – 68kg | (China) Tie Yinghua | def. | (Belarus) Dmitry Varats | Unanimous Decision After an Extra Round | 4 | 3:00 |
| Kickboxing – 67kg | (France) Fabio Pinca | def. | (China) Yang Zhuo | Decision (Unanimous) | 3 | 3:00 |
| Kickboxing – 63kg | (China) Wei Rui | def. | (Spain) Khyzer Hayat Nawaz | Decision (Unanimous) | 3 | 3:00 |
| Kickboxing – 85kg | (New Zealand) Israel Adesanya | def. | (Belgium) Filip Verlinden | Decision (Unanimous) | 3 | 3:00 |
| Kickboxing – 86kg | (China) Guo Qiang | def. | (France) Cheick Sidibe | TKO | 2 |

== Glory of Heroes 2 ==
Glory of Heroes 2
- Promotion: Glory of Heroes
- Date: May 7, 2016
- Venue: Bao'an Stadium
- City: Shenzhen, China

Event chronology
| Glory of Heroes 1 | Glory of Heroes 2 | Glory of Heroes 3 |

Glory of Heroes 2 was a kickboxing event held on May 7, 2016 at the Bao'an Stadium in Shenzhen, China.

=== Results ===
Fight Card
| Weight Class | | | | Method | Round | Time | Notes |
|---|---|---|---|---|---|---|---|
| Kickboxing – 60 kg | (China) Yun Qi | def. | (Netherlands) Sergio Wielzen | Decision (Split) | 3 | 3:00 |
| MMA – 63kg | (Belgium) Ayton De Paepe | def. | (China) Wang Yayongn | TKO | 1 |
| MMA – 70kg | (Ukraine) Andrey Mitrofanov | def. | (China) He Nannan | Decision (Unanimous) | 3 | 3:00 |
| MMA – 93kg | (Russia) Kurban Omarov | def. | (China) Liu Wenbo | Decision (Unanimous) | 3 | 3:00 |
| Kickboxing – 75kg | (France) Cedric Doumbe | def. | (New Zealand) Brad Riddell | Decision (Split) | 3 | 3:00 |
| Kickboxing – 70kg | (Ukraine) Ievgenii Kurovskoy | def. | (China) Hu Yafei | Decision (Unanimous) | 3 | 3:00 |
| Kickboxing – 70 kg | (Russia) Khayal Dzhaniev | def. | (China) Zhao Chunyang | Decision (Unanimous) | 3 | 3:00 |
| Kickboxing – 63 kg | (China) Deng Zeqi | def. | (Belarus) Artur Makouski | Decision (Unanimous) | 3 | 3:00 |
| Kickboxing – 72 kg | (Germany) Enriko Kehl | def. | (China) Jiao Fukai | TKO | 2 |
| MMA – 84kg | (New Zealand) Israel Adesanya | def. | (Peru) Andrew Flores Smith | TKO | 1 |
| Kickboxing – 67 kg | (China) Qiu Jianliang | def. | (Thailand) Jaidee Noppakit | Decision (Unanimous) | 3 | 3:00 |
| Kickboxing – 63 kg | (China) Wei Rui | def. | (Japan) Ban Yungsong | Decision (Unanimous) | 3 | 3:00 |
| Kickboxing – 67 kg | (Caribbean Netherlands) Massaro Glunder | def. | (China) Yang Zhuo | Decision (Split) | 3 | 3:00 |
| Kickboxing – 68 kg | (Thailand) Kem Sitsongpeenong | def. | (China) Tie Yinghua | Decision (Unanimous) | 3 | 3:00 |
| Kickboxing – 65 kg | (Thailand) Tepthanee Winai | def. | (China) Liu Xiangming | Decision (Unanimous) | 3 | 3:00 |

== Glory of Heroes 1 ==
Glory of Heroes 1
- Promotion: Glory of Heroes
- Date: April 2, 2016
- Venue: Bao'an Stadium
- City: Shenzhen, China

Event chronology
| N/A | Glory of Heroes 1 | Glory of Heroes 2 |

Glory of Heroes 1 was a kickboxing event held on April 2, 2016 at the Bao'an Stadium in Shenzhen, China.

=== Results ===
Fight Card
| Weight Class | | | | Method | Round | Time | Notes |
|---|---|---|---|---|---|---|---|
| Kickboxing – 70 kg | (Romania) Andrei Ostrovanu | def. | (China) Zhang Dezheng | Decision (Unanimous) | 3 | 3:00 |
| Kickboxing – Woman 56 kg | (China) Gong Yanli | def. | (United Kingdom) Christi Brereton | Decision (Split) | 3 | 3:00 |
| Kickboxing – 70 kg | (China) Zhao Chunyang | def. | (New Zealand) Harley Love | Decision (Unanimous) | 3 | 3:00 |
| Kickboxing – 85 kg | (Ukraine) Yurii Zubchuk | def. | (China) Guo Qiang | Decision (Unanimous) | 3 | 3:00 |
| Kickboxing – 70 kg | (Germany) Daniel Solaja | def. | (China) Hu Yafei | Decision (Unanimous) | 3 | 3:00 |
| MMA – 63 kg | (Russia) Ilia Kurzanov | def. | (China) Ji Xian | Submission (Guillotine Choke) | 1 |
| Kickboxing – 70 kg | (China) Jixiang Adai | def. | (Japan) Imamura Takuya | Decision (Unanimous) | 3 | 3:00 |
| Kickboxing – 60 kg | (China) Kong Long | def. | (Japan) Nogami Yusuke | Decision (Unanimous) | 3 | 3:00 |
| Kickboxing – 68 kg | (China) Tie Yinghua | def. | (France) Fabio Pinca | Decision (Split) | 3 | 3:00 |
| Kickboxing – 85 kg | (Brazil) Alex Pereira | def. | (Nigeria) Israel Adesanya | Decision (Unanimous) | 3 | 3:00 |
| Kickboxing – 63 kg | (China) Wei Rui | def. | (Japan) Nakamura Yukiya | KO | 1 |
| Kickboxing – 71 kg | (China) Yi Long | def. | (Germany) Enriko Kehl | Decision (Unanimous) | 3 | 3:00 |
| Kickboxing – 63 kg | (China) Deng Zeqi | def. | (Colombia) Joan Manuel Lique Canaveral | KO | 1 |
| Kickboxing – 67 kg | (China) Qiu Jianliang | def. | (Thailand) Jomthong Chuwattana | Unanimous Decision After an Extra Round | 4 | 3:00 |
| Kickboxing – 70 kg | (Canada) Josh Jauncey | def. | (China) Xu Yan | KO | 3 |

== See also ==
- 2016 in Glory
- 2016 in K-1
- 2016 in Kunlun Fight
