= Zheng Junfeng =

Chinese kickboxer

- Born: 郑军峰; April 19, 1992 (age 34); Shenqiu County, Henan Province, China
- Other names: 郑军鹏
- Height: 175 cm (5 ft 9 in)
- Weight: 63 kg (139 lb; 9.9 st)
- Style: Sanda, Kickboxing
- Stance: Orthodox
- Fighting out of: Chongqing, China
- Team: Fengbao Fighting Club (2024-Present); Chongqing Fengbao Fighting Club (2015-2023)

Kickboxing record
- Total: 44
- Wins: 37
- By knockout: 13
- Losses: 7

Other information
- University: Xi'an Institute of Physical Education

Zheng Junfeng (Chinese: 郑军峰) is a Chinese Sanda kickboxer, he currently competes in the Wu Lin Feng organization.

As of November 2021, he is ranked the #8 Super Bantamweight in the world by Combat Press.

== Career ==
Zheng Junfeng was born in started practicing Sanda at the age of 8. He made his professional debut in 2009 as he was still participating in amateur competitions. In 2011 he placed 5th in the National Tournament.

Junfeng's first notable international victory came against the Japanese champion Hirotaka Urabe who he beat by majority decision at Krush 77 on July 16, 2017.

On January 13, 2018 Junfeng faced Feng Liang for the vacant -60 kg Glory of Heroes title at the Glory of Heroes: Guangzhou event. He lost by unanimous decision.

In 2019 Junfeng joined the Wu Lin Feng organization, the next year he entered the Super Rookie Tournament. He won 4 fights in 3 months to reach the Final. On August 28, 2020 at Wu Lin Feng 2020: China New Kings Tournament Final Junfeng beat Wang Zhiwei for the Wu Lin Feng China New King title and the IPCC China -63 kg title. He won the fight by unanimous decision.

== Titles and achievements ==
- Wu Lin Feng
  - 2020 WLF China New King -63 kg Tournament Winner
- International Professional Combat Council
  - 2020 IPCC China -63 kg Champion
- International Sport Kickboxing Association
  - 2024 ISKA K-1 Asian Welterweight Champion

== Kickboxing record ==
Kickboxing record
37 Wins (13 (T)KOs), 7 Losses
Date	Result	Opponent	Event	Location	Method	Round	Time
2024-11-23	Win	(Iran) Mukano	Ace Fighting League	Chongqing, China	TKO	2	
2024-08-25	Win	(Iran) Hossam	Ace Fighting League	Qiannan, China	Decision (Unanimous)	3	3:00
2024-06-29	Win	(Iran) Darafkan Behzad	Emei Legend	Chongqing, China	TKO (low kicks)	2	
For the ISKA K-1 Asian Welterweight title.
2021-09-30	Win	(China) Jin Ying	Wu Lin Feng 2021: World Contender League 6th Stage	Zhengzhou, China	Decision (Unanimous)	3	3:00
2021-07-03	Win	(China) Shun Li	Wu Lin Feng 2021: World Contender League 5th Stage	Zhengzhou, China	Decision (Unanimous)	3	3:00
2021-03-27	Win	(China) Wang Zhiwei	Wu Lin Feng 2021: World Contender League 1st Stage	China	Ext.R Decision	4	3:00
2021-01-23	Loss	(China) Wei Rui	Wu Lin Feng 2021: Global Kung Fu Festival	Macao, China	Decision (Unanimous)	3	3:00
2020-10-16	Loss	(China) Liu Wei	Wu Lin Feng 2020: China New Kings Champions Challenge	Hangzhou, China	Ext.R Decision (Split)	4	3:00
2020-08-29	Win	(China) Wang Zhiwei	Wu Lin Feng 2020: China New Kings Tournament Final	Zhengzhou, China	Decision (Unanimous)	3	3:00
Wins WLF China New King -63kg Tournament and IPCC China -63kg title.
2020-08-03	Win	(China) Zhang Jun	Wu Lin Feng 2020: King's Super Cup 4th Group Stage	Zhengzhou, China	Decision (Unanimous)	3	3:00
2020-07-05	Win	(China) Liu Chunrui	Wu Lin Feng 2020: King's Super Cup 3rd Group Stage	Zhengzhou, China	Decision (Unanimous)	3	3:00
2020-06-13	Win	(China) Jiduo Yibu	Wu Lin Feng 2020: King's Super Cup 2nd Group Stage	Zhengzhou, China	Decision (Unanimous)	3	3:00
2020-05-15	Win	(China) Wang Wanli	Wu Lin Feng 2020: King's Super Cup 1st Group Stage	Zhengzhou, China	Decision (Unanimous)	3	3:00
2019-11-30	Loss	(Iran) Ali Zarinfar	Wu Lin Feng 2019: WLF -67kg World Cup 2019-2020 6th Group Stage	Zhengzhou, China	Decision	3	3:00
2019-09-28	Loss	(Spain) Daniel Puertas Gallardo	WLF -67kg World Cup 2019-2020 Contender Tournament Semi Final	Zhengzhou, China	Decision (Unanimous)	3	3:00
2018-10-20	Win	(Ukraine) Vladyslav Melnyk	Glory of Heroes 36: Ziyang	Sichuan, China	Decision (Unanimous)	3	3:00
2018-09-15	Loss	(China) Yun Qi	Glory of Heroes 34: Tongling	Tongling, China	Decision (Unanimous)	3	3:00
2018-07-28	Win	(Thailand) Thapanapong	Glory of Heroes 33: Shanghai	Shanghai, China	Decision (Unanimous)	3	3:00
2018-03-03	Win	(New Zealand) Craig Marshall Hughes	Glory of Heroes: New Zealand vs China	Auckland, New Zealand	TKO	2	
2018-01-13	Loss	(China) Feng Liang	Glory of Heroes: Guangzhou	Guangzhou, China	Decision (Unanimous)	3	3:00
For the Glory of Heroes -60kg title.
2017-09-23	Win	(China) Li Ning	Glory of Heroes: Luoyang	Luoyang, China	Decision (Unanimous)	3	3:00
2017-07-16	Win	(Japan) Hirotaka Urabe	Krush.77	Tokyo, Japan	Decision (Majority)	3	3:00
2017-03-25	Win	(Russia) Abdullah Allev	Rise of Heroes: Hengyang	Hengyang, China	Decision (Unanimous)	3	3:00
2016-01-23	Win	(Japan) Kengo Maruta		Xi'an, China	KO	1	
2015-04-24	Win	(Germany) Mark	Hua Wujue	Changzhou, China	KO	1	0:32
2015-01-31	Win	(Thailand) Sripana	Wu Lin Feng 2015 New Year Festival	Chongqing, China			
2015-01-24	Win	(Thailand) Krongching	Hua Wujue	Huiyang, China			
2009-02-28	Win	(Vietnam) Phan Ying Tang	Wu Lin Feng China vs Vietnam	Zhengzhou, China	Decision	3	3:00
Legend: Win Loss Draw/No contest Notes

== Mixed martial arts record ==
Professional record breakdown
13 matches	10 wins	2 losses
By knockout	2	0
By submission	4	1
By decision	3	1
Unknown	1	0
No contests	1	

Res.	Record	Opponent	Method	Event	Date	Round	Time	Location	Notes
Win	10-2 (1)	(Hungary) Benjamin Molnár	Submission (guillotine choke)	WKFCMC - MMA Bajnokság	17 September 2016	2		Budapest, Hungary	
Win	9-2 (1)	(France) Abdelmoumen Mssaate	Submission (guillotine choke)	WKFCMC	24 July 2016	2		Beijing, China	
Loss	8-2 (1)	(Russia) Abdulmutalip Gairbekov	Decision (Unanimous)	WLF E.P.I.C. 4	28 May 2016	3	5:00	Zhengzhou, China	
Win	8-1 (1)	(China) Huang Jie	Decision	Hanfeng Wuhun	22 May 2016	2		Beijing, China	
NC	7-1 (1)	(Japan) Shooto Watanabe		WLF E.P.I.C. 2	12 March 2016	2	3:00	Zhengzhou, China	Originally a second round TKO win for Junfeng later overturned to a no contest.
Win	7-1	(China) Wei Chengjin	Submission (leg lock)	WKFCMC	31 January 2016			Beijing, China	
Win	6-1	(Ukraine) Artur Kascheev	TKO (punches)	WLF E.P.I.C. 1	13 January 2016	3	5:00	Zhengzhou, China	
Win	5-1	(China) Zhou Jianyang	Submission (armbar)		2015	1	0:30	China	
Win	4-1	(United Kingdom) Mike	TKO	China Mixed Fight Alliance	9 November 2013	1	2:50	Xuchang, China	
Win	3-1	(Korea) Liu Ji Kang	Decision	Hanfeng Wuhun	22 January 2013	3	5:00	Xuzhou, China	
Loss	2-1	(China) Liang Yang	Submission (armbar)	RUFF 7	22 December 2012	2	4:41	Nanjing, Jiangsu, China	
Win	2-0	(China) Juncheng Wen	Decision	RUFF 6	3 November 2012	3	5:00	Hohhot, Inner Mongolia, China	
Win	1-0	(China) Li Zaihao	Decision	Shaanxi Ultimate Fighting Tournament	30 October 2010			Shaanxi, China	

Exhibition record breakdown		
3 matches	3 wins	0 losses
By submission	2	0
By decision	1	0

Res.	Record	Opponent	Method	Event	Date	Round	Time	Location	Notes
Win	3-0	(China) Zheng Boqie	Submission (Armbar)		2015	1		China	Final
Win	2-0	(China) Bai Juzheng	Submission (Guillotine choke)		2015			China	Semi Final
Win	1-0	(China) Gu Wenzhen	Decision (Unanimous)		2015			China	Quarter Final

== Mixed rules record ==
Professional record breakdown
1 match	0 wins	1 loss
By knockout	0	1

Res.	Record	Opponent	Method	Event	Date	Round	Time	Location	Notes
Loss	0–1	(China) Xiao Long	TKO (Hand injury)	Huya Kung Fu Carnival 4	May 15, 2021	2	3:00	Zhengzhou, China	Mixed rules fight starting with 2 rounds in Kickboxing rules followed by 2 rounds in MMA rules.

== See also ==
- List of male kickboxers
