= 2017 in Glory of Heroes =

Information
- First date: January 1, 2017
- Last date: December 23, 2017

Events
- Total events: 14

Glory of Heroes by Wanmingyang Media is a kickboxing promotion. The first event in 2017 was on January 14, 2017 at the Jiyuan Basketball Stadium in Jiyuan, Henan, China. January 13, 2017 22:00 Shenzhen TV broadcast Worldwide.

== List of events ==
No.	Event	Date	Venue	City
14	Glory of Heroes: Jinan	December 23, 2017	Jinan Olympic Sports Center	Jinan, China
13	Glory of Heroes: China VS Switzerland	November 18, 2017	Salle Du Midi	Martigny, Switzerland
12	Glory of Heroes: China VS Spain	November 11, 2017	Pabellon Fernando Martin Fuenlabrada	Madrid, Spain
11	Glory of Heroes: Luoyang	September 23, 2017	Wan Ming Tang Sports Center	Luoyang, Henan, China
10	Glory of Heroes: Japan & Krush.77	July 16, 2017	Korakuen Hall	Tokyo, Japan
09	Glory of Heroes: Shangyu	June 16, 2017	Shangyu Huatong Gymnasium	Shangyu, Zhejiang, China
08	Glory of Heroes: Portugal & Strikers League	May 27, 2017	Pavilhao Quinta dos Lombos	Carcavelos, Portugal
07	Glory of Heroes: Spain & Strikers League	May 20, 2017	Santa Cruz de Tenerife	Tenerife, Spain
06	Rise of Heroes / Conquest of Heroes: Chengde	April 28, 2017	Olympic Sports Center Gymnasium	Chengde, Hebei, China
05	Rise of Heroes: Hengyang	March 25, 2017	Hengyang Sports Center	Hengyang, Hunan, China
04	Glory of Heroes 7	March 4, 2017	Ginasio do Ibirapuera	Sao Paulo, Brazil
03	Rise of Heroes 7: China vs New Zealand	February 18, 2017	ASB Stadium	Auckland, New Zealand
02	Glory of Heroes 6	January 13, 2017	Jiyuan Basketball Stadium	Jiyuan, Henan, China
01	Rise of Heroes 6	January 1, 2017	Ming Hua Gymnasium	Puning, Guangdong, China

== Glory of Heroes: Jinan ==
Glory of Heroes: Jinan
- Promotion: Glory of Heroes
- Date: December 23, 2017
- Venue: Jinan Olympic Sports Center
- City: Jinan, China

Event chronology
Glory of Heroes: China VS Switzerland	Glory of Heroes: Jinan	Glory of Heroes: Wudang Mountain

Glory of Heroes: Jinan was a kickboxing and MMA event held on December 23, 2017 at the Jinan Olympic Sports Center in Jinan, China.

=== Results ===
Main Card
Weight Class				Method	Round	Time	Notes
Featherweight 65 kg	(China) Qiu Jianliang	def.	(Russia) Aleksei Ulianov	Decision (Unanimous)	3	3:00	65 kg Tournament Semi-finals A
Featherweight 65 kg	(France) Dylan Salvador	def.	(Georgia (country)) Giga Chikadze	Ex. R Decision (Unanimous)	4	3:00	65 kg Tournament Semi-finals B
Junior Bantamweight 57 kg	(Russia) Astemir Borsov	def.	(China) Wang Junguang	Decision (Unanimous)	3	3:00	57 kg Tournament Semi-finals A
Junior Bantamweight 57 kg	(France) Hakim Hamech	def.	(China) Yun Qi	Decision (Unanimous)	3	3:00	57 kg Tournament Semi-finals B
Featherweight 65 kg	(China) Qiu Jianliang	def.	(France) Dylan Salvador	Decision (Unanimous)	3	3:00	65 kg Tournament Finals
Super Fights
MMA Bantamweight 61 kg	(Mongolia) Gantulkhuur	def.	(China) Wang Yayong	Decision (Unanimous)	3	5:00	
MMA Flyweight 57 kg	(China) Yin Shuai	def.	(Mongolia) Mendbayar	Submission (Armbar)	2		
Featherweight 65 kg	(China) Zhou Yi	def.	(Thailand) Chairit	TKO	1		
Youth League
Bantamweight 60 kg	(China) Wu Zhendong	def.	(China) Jia Ziteng	Decision (Unanimous)	3	3:00	
Lightweight 70 kg	(China) Guo Mengfei	def.	(China) Jiang Menghui	Decision (Unanimous)	3	3:00	
Junior Middleweight 75 kg	(China) Han Haojie	def.	(China) Shi Shuai	Decision (Unanimous)	3	3:00	
MMA Lightweight 70 kg	(China) Jia Shuyu	def.	(China) Song Shuai	TKO			

=== 2017 GOH Featherweight Contender Tournament bracket ===
Semi-finals
(China) Qiu Jianliang	DEC
(Russia) Aleksei Ulianov	3R
(Georgia (country)) Giga Chikadze	4R
(France) Dylan Salvador	DEC

Final
(China) Qiu Jianliang	DEC
(France) Dylan Salvador	3R

== Glory of Heroes: China VS Switzerland ==
Glory of Heroes: China VS Switzerland
- Promotion: Glory of Heroes
- Date: November 18, 2017
- Venue: Salle Du Midi
- City: Martigny, Switzerland

Event chronology
Glory of Heroes: China VS Spain	Glory of Heroes: China VS Switzerland	Glory of Heroes: Jinan

Glory of Heroes: China VS Switzerland and Strikers League: Martigny was a kickboxing and MMA event held on November 18, 2017 at the Salle Du Midi in Martigny, Switzerland.

=== Results ===
Main Card
Weight Class				Method	Round	Time	Notes
Kickboxing - 73 kg	(Kosovo) Qendrim Bajrami	def.	(China) Hao Shengbin	KO (punch)	1		Strikers League World Champion Title -75 kg
Kickboxing - 67 kg	(France) Jamal Wahib	def.	(China) Chen Yage	Decision	3	3:00	Strikers League World Champion Title -67 kg
Superfights Kickboxing
Kickboxing - 65.5 kg	(Kosovo) Liridon Koxha	def.	(China) Guo Weidong	Decision	3	3:00	
Kickboxing - 58 kg	(France) Elias Mahmoudi	def.	(China) Yin Shuai	Decision	3	3:00	
Kickboxing - 59 kg	(China) Huo Xiaolong	def.	(Switzerland) Nabiyom Tesfai	TKO (cut)	2		
Kickboxing - 63 kg	(China) Deng Zeqi	def.	(Switzerland) Hiwa Attari	Decision	3	3:00	
Superfights MMA
MMA - 85 kg	(China) Fan Rong	def.	(Albania) Gevorg Sargsyan	Submission	1		
MMA - 61 kg	(Switzerland) Anthony Riggio	def.	(China) He Jinhao	Submission	1		
MMA - 66 kg	(China) Wang Jizheng	def.	(France) Alex Abin	KO (punch)	2		
MMA - 63 kg	(China) Cui Liucai	def.	(Peru) Alberto Popa	Submission	3		

== Glory of Heroes: China VS Spain ==
Glory of Heroes: China VS Spain
- Promotion: Glory of Heroes
- Date: November 11, 2017
- Venue: Pabellon Fernando Martin Fuenlabrada
- City: Madrid, Spain

Event chronology
Glory of Heroes: Luoyang	Glory of Heroes: China VS Spain	Glory of Heroes: China VS Switzerland

Glory of Heroes: China VS Spain and Strikers League: Madrid was a kickboxing and MMA event held on November 11, 2017 at the Pabellon Fernando Martin Fuenlabrada in Madrid, Spain.

=== Results ===
Fight Card
Weight Class				Method	Round	Time	Notes
Kickboxing - 63 kg	(China) Wei Rui	def.	(Spain) Jesus Romero	Decision (Unanimous)	3	3:00	Strikers League World Champion Title -63.5 kg
Kickboxing - 75 kg	(Spain) Felix Carpintero	def.	(New Zealand) Bradley Riddell	Decision (Unanimous)	3	3:00	
Kickboxing - 65 kg	(China) Liu Xiangming	def.	(Spain) Jacko Nicola	Decision (Unanimous)	3	3:00	
Kickboxing - Woman 55 kg	(Spain) Diana Calderon	def.	(China) Yang Yang	Decision (Unanimous)	3	3:00	
Kickboxing - 70 kg	(China) Zhao Chunyang	def.	(Spain) Angei Herrero	TKO	2		
Kickboxing - 67 kg	(Spain) Roberto Alario	def.	(China) Yan Shuaiqi	Decision (Unanimous)	3	3:00	
Kickboxing - 57 kg	(Spain) Antonio Orden	def.	(China) Xu Luzhe	Decision (Unanimous)	3	3:00	Strikers League World Champion Title -57 kg
MMA - 66 kg	(China) He Nannan	def.	(Spain) Roman Stakhuv	Submission (Rear-Naked Choke)	1		
MMA - 61 kg	(China) Wang Shuo	def.	(Spain) Aleiandro Rumin	Decision (Unanimous)	3	5:00	
MMA - 66 kg	(Brazil) Alberth Dias	def.	(China) Jiang Zexian	Decision (Unanimous)	3	5:00	

== Glory of Heroes: Luoyang ==
Glory of Heroes: Luoyang
- Promotion: Glory of Heroes
- Date: September 23, 2017
- Venue: Wan Ming Tang Sports Center
- City: Luoyang, Henan, China

Event chronology
Glory of Heroes: Japan & Krush.77	Glory of Heroes: Luoyang	Glory of Heroes: China VS Spain

Glory of Heroes: Luoyang was a kickboxing and MMA event held on September 23, 2017 at the Wan Ming Tang Sports Center in Luoyang, Henan, China.

=== Results ===
Undercard Youth League
Weight Class				Method	Round	Time	Notes
Kickboxing - 57 kg	(China) Chen Zhen	vs.	(China) Dai Shijie		3	3:00	
Kickboxing - 67 kg	(China) Zhang Yang	vs.	(China) Lin Yiming		3	3:00	
Kickboxing - 65 kg	(China) Lan Bo	vs.	(China) Li Wenlong		3	3:00	
MMA - 61 kg	(China) Li Haojie	def.	(China) Teng Chengdi	Decision (unanimous)	3	5:00	
Main Card
Kickboxing - 60 kg	(China) Feng Liang	def.	(Netherlands) Sergio Wielzen	TKO	2		60 kg Tournament Semi-finals 1
Kickboxing - 60 kg	(China) Zheng Junfeng	def.	(China) Li Ning	Decision (unanimous)	3	3:00	60 kg Tournament Semi-finals 2
Kickboxing - Woman 56 kg	(China) Yang Yang	def.	(Portugal) Pilipa Coraelia	Decision (unanimous)	3	3:00	
Kickboxing - 70 kg	(Portugal) Ricardo Luiz	def.	(China) Hao Shengbin	Decision (unanimous)	3	3:00	
Kickboxing - 65 kg	(China) Liu Xiangming	def.	(Thailand) Katanyu	KO	1		
Kickboxing - 63 kg	(China) Wei Rui	def.	(Thailand) Thanonchai Thanakorngym	Decision (unanimous)	3	3:00	63 kg Tournament Semi-finals 1
MMA - 63 kg	(China) Cui Liucai	def.	(Portugal) Fabio Sousa	TKO	2		
MMA - 68 kg	(Croatia) Leo Zulic	def.	(China) He Nannan	TKO	1		
MMA - 61 kg	(Portugal) Mario Moreno	def.	(China) He Jinhao	Submission (rear-naked choke)	1		
MMA - 61 kg	(China) Wang Shuo	def.	(Portugal) Vando De Almeida	Decision (unanimous)	3	5:00	
MMA - 85 kg	(China) Fan Rong	def.	(Portugal) Falco Neto Lopes	Submission (Leglock)	1		

== Glory of Heroes: Japan & Krush.77 ==
Glory of Heroes: Japan & Krush.77
- Promotion: Glory of Heroes
- Date: July 16, 2017
- Venue: Korakuen Hall
- City: Tokyo, Japan

Event chronology
Glory of Heroes: Shangyu	Glory of Heroes: Japan & Krush.77	Glory of Heroes: Luoyang

Glory of Heroes: Japan & Krush.77 was a kickboxing event held on July 16, 2017 at the Korakuen Hall in Tokyo, Japan.

=== Results ===
China 6 vs 6 Japan
Weight Class				Method	Round	Time	Notes
Kickboxing - 58 kg	(China) Wang Junguang	def.	(Japan) Yuzuki Satomi	Decision (2-0)	3	3:00	
Kickboxing - 58.5 kg	(Japan) Sano Tenma	def.	(China) Yun Qi	Decision (3-0)	3	3:00	
Kickboxing - 63 kg	(Japan) Rukiya Anpo	def.	(China) Deng Zeqi	KO	1	1:53	
Kickboxing - 67.5 kg	(China) Tie Yinghua	def.	(Japan) Watabe Daiki	Decision (2-0)	3	3:00	
Kickboxing - 66 kg	(China) Qiu Jianliang	def.	(Japan) Komiya Yukihiro	Decision (3-0)	3	3:00	
Kickboxing - 60 kg	(China) Zheng Junfeng	def.	(Japan) Hirotaka Urabe	Decision (2-0)	3	3:00	
Krush Fight Card
Kickboxing - 63 kg	(Japan) Kyoshiro	def.	(Japan) Aotsu Junpei	Decision (3-0)	3	3:00	
Kickboxing - 53 kg	(Japan) Kaneko Akihiro	def.	(Japan) Yamada Tadahiro	KO	2	1:03	
Kickboxing - 60 kg	(Japan) Miwa Yuki	Draw	(Japan) Hashimoto Ryota	Decision (1-0)	3	3:00	
Kickboxing - 63 kg	(Japan) Nakano Kota	def.	(Japan) Ishikawa Yuki	Decision (2-0)	3	3:00	
Kickboxing - 55 kg	(Japan) Okawa Kazuki	def.	(Japan) Ishitsuka Hiroto	Decision (2-0)	3	3:00	

== Glory of Heroes: Shangyu ==
Glory of Heroes: Shangyu
- Promotion: Glory of Heroes
- Date: June 16, 2017
- Venue: Shangyu Huatong Gymnasium
- City: Shangyu, Zhejiang, China

Event chronology
Glory of Heroes: Portugal & Strikers League	Glory of Heroes: Shangyu	Glory of Heroes: Japan & Krush.77

Glory of Heroes: Shangyu was a kickboxing and MMA event held on June 16, 2017 at the Shangyu Huatong Gymnasium in Shangyu, Shaoxing, Zhejiang, China.

=== Results ===
Fight Card
Weight Class				Method	Round	Time	Notes
MMA - 66 kg	(China) Ma Teng	def.	(Mongolia) Gantulkhuur	Submission (toe hold)	1
MMA - 66 kg	(China) He Nannan	def.	(Kazakhstan) Davlatov	Decision (Unanimous)	3	5:00
Kickboxing - 65 kg	(China) Guo Weidong	vs.	(Thailand) Klanrong		3	3:00
Kickboxing - Woman 52 kg	(China) Wang Xue	def.	(Spain) Sheila Garcia	Decision (Unanimous)	3	3:00
Kickboxing - 57 kg	(China) Huo Xiaolong	def.	(Philippines) Gayman Jhaymie	TKO (Knee)	1	2:35
Kickboxing - 67 kg	(China) Tie Yinghua	def.	(Tajikistan) Zoomi Latif	KO (punches)	2
Kickboxing - 67 kg	(China) Chen Yage	def.	(Tajikistan) Khudoyor	TKO (punches)	1
Kickboxing - 70 kg	(United Kingdom) Ricewondepps Nathanoliver	def.	(China) Zhao Chunyang	Decision (Unanimous)	3	3:00
Kickboxing - 65 kg	(China) Qiu Jianliang	def.	(Thailand) Subsakorn	KO (Spinning Heel Kick)	2	2:59
Kickboxing - 57 kg	(Portugal) Rui Botelho	def.	(China) Xu Luzhe	Ext. R Decision	4	3:00
Kickboxing - 67 kg	(China) Yan Shuaiqi	def.	(Thailand) Aranchai Kiatpatarapan	Decision (Unanimous)	3	3:00

== Glory of Heroes: Portugal & Strikers League ==
Glory of Heroes: Portugal & Strikers League
- Promotion: Glory of Heroes
- Date: May 27, 2017
- Venue: Pavilhao Quinta dos Lombos
- City: Carcavelos, Portugal

Event chronology
Glory of Heroes: Spain & Strikers League	Glory of Heroes: Portugal & Strikers League	Glory of Heroes: Shangyu

Glory of Heroes: Portugal & Strikers League was a kickboxing and MMA event held on May 27, 2017 at the Pavilhao Quinta dos Lombos in Carcavelos, Portugal.

=== Results ===
Fight Card
Weight Class				Method	Round	Time	Notes
MMA - 61 kg	(China) Yang Sen	vs.	(Portugal) Moreno		3	5:00
MMA - 70 kg	(China) Ye Er Ruer	vs.	(Portugal) Helson Henriques		3	5:00
MMA - Woman 52 kg	(China) Huang Feier	vs.	(Portugal) Elizabeth		3	5:00
MMA - 66 kg	(China) Ma Teng	vs.	(Portugal) Jilbergs Gomes		3	5:00
Kickboxing - 57 kg	(China) Wang Junguang	vs.	(Portugal) Bernardo Mendes		3	3:00
Kickboxing - 67 kg	(Portugal) Luis Passos	def.	(China) Han Wenbao	Decision	3	3:00	67 kg 4Men Tournament, Semi-finals A
Kickboxing - 67 kg	(Switzerland) Sebastien Fleury	def.	(China) Lu Jianbo	Decision	3	3:00	67 kg 4Men Tournament, Semi-finals B
Kickboxing - Woman 56 kg	(Portugal) Marisa Pires	def.	(China) Yang Yang	KO
Kickboxing - 67 kg	(China) Qiu Jianliang	def.	(Portugal) Diego Freitas	Ext. R Decision	4	3:00
Kickboxing - 77 kg	(Portugal) Diogo Calado	def.	(New Zealand) Bradley Riddell	Decision	3	3:00
Kickboxing - 67 kg	(Portugal) Luis Passos	def.	(Switzerland) Sebastien Fleury		3	3:00	67 kg 4Men Tournament, Finals

== Glory of Heroes: Spain & Strikers League ==
Glory of Heroes: Spain & Strikers League
- Promotion: Glory of Heroes
- Date: May 20, 2017
- Venue: Santa Cruz de Tenerife
- City: Tenerife, Spain

Event chronology
Rise of Heroes / Conquest of Heroes: Chengde	Glory of Heroes: Spain & Strikers League	Glory of Heroes: Portugal & Strikers League

Glory of Heroes: Spain & Strikers League was a kickboxing and MMA event held on May 20, 2017 at the Santa Cruz de Tenerife in Tenerife, Spain.

=== Results ===
Fight Card
Weight Class				Method	Round	Time	Notes
MMA - 61 kg	(Spain) Jonathan Guerrero	def.	(China) Shi Xiaoyu	Submission	1
MMA - 70 kg	(China) Bao Yincang	def.	(Spain) Kevin Delgado	KO	1
MMA - 61 kg	(Spain) Kevin Cordero	def.	(China) Li Haojie	Decision (Split)	3	5:00
MMA - 66 kg	(China) Wang Jizheng	def.	(Spain) Thiago Martins	TKO	5
Kickboxing - 70 kg	(Senegal) Elam Ngor	def.	(France) Vang Moua	Decision	3	3:00
Kickboxing - 70 kg	(China) Hao Shengbin	def.	(Spain) Jhon Diaz	KO	1		70 kg 4Men Tournament, Semi-finals A
Kickboxing - 70 kg	(Spain) David Ruiz	def.	(China) Ni jun	KO	1		70 kg 4Men Tournament, Semi-finals B
Kickboxing - Woman 52 kg	(China) Wang Xue	def.	(Spain) Rita Marrero	Decision	3	3:00
Kickboxing - 67 kg	(China) Tie Yinghua	def.	(Spain) Adonai Mederos	Decision (Unanimous)	3	3:00
Kickboxing - 70 kg	(Spain) Maikel Garcia	def.	(China) Zhou Tao	KO	1		Strikers League World Title -70 kg
Kickboxing - 70 kg	(Spain) David Ruiz	def.	(China) Hao Shengbin	KO	3		70 kg 4Men Tournament, Finals

== Rise of Heroes / Conquest of Heroes: Chengde ==
Rise of Heroes / Conquest of Heroes: Chengde
- Promotion: Glory of Heroes
- Date: April 28, 2017
- Venue: Olympic Sports Center Gymnasium
- City: Chengde, Hebei, China

Event chronology
Rise of Heroes: Hengyang	Rise of Heroes / Conquest of Heroes: Chengde	Glory of Heroes: Spain & Strikers League

Rise of Heroes / Conquest of Heroes: Chengde was a kickboxing and MMA event held on April 28, 2017 at the Olympic Sports Center Gymnasium in Chengde, Hebei, China.

=== Results ===
Fight Card
Weight Class				Method	Round	Time	Notes
Kickboxing - 57 kg	(China) Yun Qi	def.	(Thailand) Pakkalck	KO (punches)	1	2:57
Kickboxing - 65 kg	(Romania) Cristian Spetcu	def.	(China) Liu Xiangming	KO (punches)	3
Kickboxing - Women 56 kg	(China) Yang Yang	def.	(Italy) Gloria Peritore	Decision (Unanimous)	3	3:00
Kickboxing - 63 kg	(China) Wei Rui	def.	(Thailand) Narongwut Kaeongam	TKO (Low kick)	2	0:45
Kickboxing - 67 kg	(China) Han Wenbao	def.	(Thailand) Tongdee Kittipong	Decision (Unanimous)	3	3:00
MMA - 61 kg	(China) Shi Xiaoyu	def.	(Russia) Sirazhutdin Akhmedrabadanov	TKO	2
MMA - 61 kg	(Uzbekistan) Sherzodbek Boymirzaev	def.	(China) Li Haojie	Decision (Unanimous)	3	5:00
MMA - 61 kg	(Russia) Gadzhi Magomedov	def.	(China) Yang Sen	Decision (Unanimous)	3	5:00
MMA - 66 kg	(China) He Nannan	def.	(Georgia (country)) Beno Adamia	TKO	1
MMA - 66 kg	(Uzbekistan) Babyrjan Abdulhakov	def.	(China) Huang Heqing	TKO	2
MMA - 61 kg	(China) Ji Xian	def.	(Uzbekistan) Sardor Sadykov	Submission	1
MMA - 66 kg	(Russia) Zamir Aripshev	def.	(China) Jiang Zexian	Decision (Unanimous)	3	5:00
MMA - 84 kg	(China) Make Shate	def.	(Russia) Oleg	TKO	1
MMA - 84 kg	(China) Shun Feng	def.	(Uzbekistan) Abbos	Decision (Unanimous)	3	5:00
MMA - 61 kg	(China) He Jinhao	def.	(Georgia (country)) Akaki Khorava	Decision (Unanimous)	3	5:00
MMA - 61 kg	(China) Wang Shuo	def.	(Kazakhstan) Baglan Mygymbaev	TKO	2
MMA - 105 kg	(Russia) Nikolay Savilov	def.	(China) Liu Wenbo	Decision (Unanimous)	3	5:00
MMA - Women 56 kg	(United States) Gabby Romero	def.	(China) Meng Bo	Submission (Armbar)	1	4:37
MMA - 84 kg	(China) Fan Rong	def.	(Kazakhstan) Ilyar Iminov	TKO	2
MMA - Women 52 kg	(China) Huang Feier	def.	(Greece) Dimitri Roy	Submission (Armbar)	1
MMA - 61 kg	(Japan) Akuri Ronda	def.	(China) Wulan Ailinuer	Submission (Rear Naked Choke)	1
MMA - 66 kg	(Ukraine) Yurii Bosyi	def.	(China) A Re Xiate	Submission (Rear Naked Choke)	3
MMA - 63 kg	(China) Cui Liucai	vs.	(Philippines) Francis Romero		3	5:00
MMA - Women 52 kg	(China) Wang Xue	vs.	(Russia) Enovanova Carrollina		3	5:00

== Rise of Heroes: Hengyang ==
Rise of Heroes: Hengyang
- Promotion: Glory of Heroes
- Date: March 25, 2017
- Venue: Hengyang Sports Center
- City: Hengyang, Hunan, China

Event chronology
Rise of Heroes 7: China vs New Zealand	Rise of Heroes: Hengyang	Rise of Heroes / Conquest of Heroes: Chengde

Rise of Heroes: Hengyang was a kickboxing event held on March 25, 2017 at the Hengyang Sports Center in Hengyang, Hunan, China.

=== Fight Card ===
Fight Card
Weight Class				Method	Round	Time	Notes
Kickboxing - 57 kg	(China) Wang Junguang	def.	(Thailand) Shaxi	Decision (Unanimous)	3	3:00
Kickboxing - 58 kg	(China) Huo Xiaolong	def.	(Portugal) Rui Botelho	Decision (Unanimous)	3	3:00
Kickboxing - 65 kg	(Thailand) Subsakorn	def.	(China) Liu Xiangming	Decision (Unanimous)	3	3:00
Kickboxing - Woman 56 kg	(China) Yang Yang	def.	(France) Fatima Bassriel	Decision (Unanimous)	3	3:00
Kickboxing - 67 kg	(Portugal) Diego Freitas	def.	(China) Chen Yage	Decision (Unanimous)	3	3:00
Kickboxing - 69 kg	(Russia) Korser Sergei	def.	(China) Tie Yinghua	TKO(cut/doctor stops)	3
Kickboxing - 60 kg	(China) Zheng Junfeng	def.	(Russia) Abdullah Allev	Decision (Unanimous)	3	3:00
Kickboxing - Woman 54 kg	(China) Gong Yanli	def.	(Thailand) Tanachana	Decision (Unanimous)	3	3:00
Kickboxing - 73 kg	(China) Guo Xichuang	def.	(Russia) Emirov Islam	TKO	3
Kickboxing - 69 kg	(China) Hu Yafei	def.	(Spain) Menuel Ferendex	TKO (Referee Stoppage)	2	2:43
Kickboxing - 65 kg	(China) Guo Weidong	def.	(Russia) Abdul Malik	Decision (Unanimous)	3	3:00
Kickboxing - 67 kg	(China) Yan Shuaiqi	def.	(Tajikistan) Bobo John	TKO (Referee Stoppage)	1

== Glory of Heroes 7 ==
Glory of Heroes 7
- Promotion: Glory of Heroes
- Date: March 4, 2017
- Venue: Ginasio do Ibirapuera
- City: Sao Paulo, Brazil

Event chronology
Glory of Heroes 6	Glory of Heroes 7	Glory of Heroes 8

Glory of Heroes 7 was a kickboxing and MMA event held on March 4, 2017 at the Ginasio do Ibirapuera in Sao Paulo, Brazil.

=== Results ===
Fight Card
Weight Class				Method	Round	Time	Notes
Kickboxing - 63 kg	(China) Deng Zeqi	def.	(Brazil) Hector Santiago	TKO (Right Hook)	3
Kickboxing - 71 kg	(China) Zhou Tao	def.	(Brazil) Alex Oller	KO	2
Kickboxing - 65 kg	(China) Zhou Yi	def.	(Brazil) Marcus Vinicius	Decision (Unanimous)	3	3:00
Kickboxing - 63 kg	(Brazil) Paulo Pizzo	def.	(China) Kong Long	Decision (Extra Round)	3	3:00
Kickboxing - 77 kg	(Brazil) Fernando Nonato	def.	(China) Wei Gaojie	Decision (Unanimous)	3	3:00
Kickboxing - 85 kg	(Brazil) Alex Pereira	def.	(Nigeria) Israel Adesanya	KO	3
Kickboxing - 71 kg	(Brazil) Bruno Gazani	def.	(China) Hao Shengbin		3	3:00
Kickboxing - 67 kg	(China) Qiu Jianliang	def.	(Brazil) Wilson Djavan	Decision (Unanimous)	3	3:00
MMA - 66 kg	(China) Wang Jizheng	def.	(Brazil) Deleon Zebra	TKO	2	0:14
MMA - 63 kg	(China) Cui Liucai	def.	(Brazil) Thiago de Paula	Submission (Armbar)	3	2:59
MMA - 61 kg	(Brazil) Marcos Breno	def.	(China) Li Haojie	Submission (Rear Naked Choke)	2	2:49
MMA - 52 kg	(Brazil) Ariane Carnelossi	def.	(China) Huang Feier	TKO (Punches)	2	4:45
MMA - 61 kg	(China) Yang Sen	def.	(Brazil) Israel Ottoni	Decision (Split)	3	5:00
MMA - 56 kg	(Brazil) Aline Sattelmayer	def.	(China) Meng Bo	TKO (Kicks and punches)	2	1:36
MMA - 66 kg	(China) Lu Jianbo	def.	(Brazil) Vinicius Fontes	TKO (Doctor stoppage)	3	3:51
MMA - 61 kg	(China) Wang Yayong	def.	(Brazil) Leo Alves	Decision (Split)	3	5:00

== Rise of Heroes 7: China vs New Zealand ==
Rise of Heroes 7 / Conquest of Heroes: China vs New Zealand
- Promotion: Glory of Heroes
- Date: February 18, 2017
- Venue: ASB Stadium
- City: Auckland, New Zealand

Event chronology
Rise of Heroes 6	Rise of Heroes 7 / Conquest of Heroes: China vs New Zealand	Rise of Heroes: Hengyang

Rise of Heroes 7 / Conquest of Heroes: China vs New Zealand was a kickboxing and MMA event held on February 18, 2017 at the ASB Stadium in Auckland, New Zealand.

=== Results ===
Fight Card
Weight Class				Method	Round	Time	Notes
Kickboxing - 69.5 kg	(China) Hu Yafei	def.	(New Zealand) Sam Haggitt	KO (Push Kick)	1
Kickboxing - 61 kg	(China) Feng Liang	def.	(New Zealand) Chris Wells	Decision (Unanimous)	3	3:00
Kickboxing - 70 kg	(China) Han Wenbao	def.	(New Zealand) Harley Love	Decision (Majority)	3	3:00	WLF South Pacific -70 kg intercontinental champion
Kickboxing - 65 kg	(China) Liu Xiangming	def.	(New Zealand) Sam Hill	Decision (Unanimous)	3	3:00
Kickboxing - 75.5 kg	(New Zealand) Tyson Turner	def.	(China) Guo Xichuang	Decision (Unanimous)	3	3:00
Kickboxing - Woman 55 kg	(China) Gong Yanli	def.	(New Zealand) Senela Small	Decision (Unanimous)	3	3:00
Kickboxing - 73.5 kg	(China) Bao Yinchang	def.	(New Zealand) Hayden Todd	TKO	3
Kickboxing - 91 kg	(China) Guo Qiang	def.	(New Zealand) Sigi Pesaleli	TKO	3		WLF South Pacific -91 kg intercontinental champion
MMA - Woman 52 kg	(New Zealand) Nyrene Crowley	def.	(China) Wang Xue	Submission (Rear-Naked Choke)	2	1:36
MMA - 61 kg	(New Zealand) Jack Ferguson	def.	(China) Shi Xiaoyu	DQ (Kick to Head of Grounded Fighter)	1	3:25
MMA - 66 kg	(New Zealand) Shane Young	def.	(China) Jiang Zexian	Technical Submission (Rear-Naked Choke)	1	5:00
MMA - 70 kg	(New Zealand) Selby Devereux	def.	(China) Shi Fujian	TKO	2

== Glory of Heroes 6 ==
Glory of Heroes 6
- Promotion: Glory of Heroes
- Date: January 13, 2017
- Venue: Jiyuan Basketball Stadium
- City: Jiyuan, Henan, China

Event chronology
Glory of Heroes 5	Glory of Heroes 6	Glory of Heroes 7

Glory of Heroes 6: Genesis was a kickboxing event held on January 14, 2017 at the Jiyuan Basketball Stadium in Jiyuan, Henan, China. January 13, 2017 22:00 Shenzhen TV broadcast Worldwide.

=== Results ===
Fight Card
Weight Class				Method	Round	Time	Notes
Kickboxing - 57.5 kg	(China) Wang Junguang	def.	(Japan) Youshida Akira	KO (punches)	2
Kickboxing - 68 kg	(China) Tie Yinghua	def.	(Brazil) Maykol Yurk	Decision (Unanimous)	3	3:00
Kickboxing - 63 kg	(China) Deng Zeqi	def.	(Greece) Stavros Exakoustidis	TKO (Right Hook)	2	0:10
Kickboxing - 67 kg	(China) Yang Zhuo	def.	(France) Charles Francois	Decision (Unanimous)	3	3:00
Kickboxing - 63 kg	(China) Wei Rui	def.	(Thailand) Petpanomrung Kiatmuu9	Decision (Extra Round)	4	3:00
Kickboxing - 66 kg	(China) Qiu Jianliang	def.	(Thailand) Kem Sitsongpeenong	KO (spinning back kick)	1
Kickboxing - 73 kg	(China) Zhou Zhipeng	def.	(Iran) Seyedisa Alamdarnezam	Decision (Extra Round)	4	3:00
Kickboxing - 60 kg	(Netherlands) Sergio Wielzen	def.	(China) Li Ning	Decision (Unanimous)	3	3:00
Kickboxing - 68 kg	(China) Han Wenbao	def.	(Thailand) Thirachai	KO	2
MMA - Junior lightweight	(China) Ji Xian	def.	(Venezuela) Raul Guzman	Decision (Unanimous)	3	5:00
MMA - Lightweight	(China) Wang Guan	def.	(Denmark) Ghassan Muhareb	KO	1
MMA - Lightweight	(China) He Nannan	def.	(Russia) Bashir Magomedov	Decision (Unanimous)	3	5:00
MMA - Welterweight	(New Zealand) Brad Riddell	def.	(China) Song Kenan	TKO (punches)	2	2:43

=== 2017 Glory of Heroes 4Men Tournament -57.5kg bracket ===
Semi-finals
(China) Wang Junguang	KO
(Japan) Youshida Akira	R2
(China) Yun Qi
(France) Hakim Hamech ^{1}

Final

^{1} Hamech Hakim can not play because of a visa issue, 4Men Tournament canceled.

== Rise of Heroes 6 ==
Rise of Heroes 6
- Promotion: Glory of Heroes
- Date: January 1, 2017
- Venue: Ming Hua Gymnasium
- City: Puning, Guangdong, China

Event chronology
Rise of Heroes 5	Rise of Heroes 6	Rise of Heroes 7: China vs New Zealand

Rise of Heroes 6 was a kickboxing event held on January 1, 2017 at the Ming Hua Gymnasium in Puning, Guangdong, China.

=== Results ===
Fight Card
Weight Class				Method	Round	Time	Notes
Kickboxing - 71 kg	(China) Liao Xin	def.	(Thailand) Krumram	Decision (Unanimous)	3	3:00
Kickboxing - 68 kg	(Russia) Temirlan	def.	(China) Lu Jianbo	KO	2
Kickboxing - Woman 54 kg	(China) Gong Yanli	def.	(Russia) Anastasia	TKO	2
Kickboxing - 75 kg	(Iran) Aboofazel	def.	(China) Guo Xichuang	Decision (Unanimous)	3	3:00
Kickboxing - 71 kg	(China) Zhou Tao	def.	(Iran) Abdul Hussein	TKO	2
Kickboxing - Woman 56 kg	(China) Yang Yang	def.	(Russia) Maria	KO	3
Kickboxing - 90 kg	(China) Guo Qiang	def.	(Russia) Shamir Mossov	TKO	3
Kickboxing - 60 kg	(China) Han Bingquan	def.	(Iran) Saeed	TKO	2	0:55
Kickboxing - 71 kg	(China) Hao Shengbin	def.	(Kazakhstan) Daulet Otarbayev	Decision (Unanimous)	3	3:00
Kickboxing - 71 kg	(Thailand) Vachara	def.	(China) Ni Jun	Decision (Split)	3	3:00
Kickboxing - 71 kg	(China) Hu Yafei	def.	(Spain) Aimai De Cayre	Decision (Unanimous)	3	3:00
Kickboxing - 65 kg	(China) Liu Xiangming	def.	(Russia) Abdulmalik Mueididor	TKO	2	1:25
Kickboxing - 71 kg	(Russia) Zainukov	def.	(China) Li Zikai	Decision (Unanimous)	3	3:00
Kickboxing - 68 kg	(Netherlands) Riduan Duadi	def.	(China) Ji Xiang	Decision (Unanimous)	3	3:00
Kickboxing - 68 kg	(Thailand) Thirachai Por.pramuk	def.	(China) Chu Hanliang	Decision (Extra Round)	4	3:00

== See also ==
- 2017 in Glory
- 2017 in Kunlun Fight
- 2017 in Wu Lin Feng
