= Wei Rui =

Chinese Sanshou kickboxer (born 1989)

- Born: June 28, 1989 (age 37); Luyi, Zhoukou, Henan, China
- Native name: 魏锐
- Other names: Demon Blade
- Height: 1.76 m (5 ft 9 1/2 in)
- Weight: 63.0 kg (138.9 lb; 9.92 st)
- Division: Bantamweight; Featherweight
- Style: Sanda
- Stance: Southpaw
- Fighting out of: Zhengzhou, China
- Team: Da Dong Xiang Fight Club (present); Liaoyang Sports School; Luyi Shaolin Wenwu School
- Trainer: Wei Zhaoquan (Luyi Shaolin Wenwu School)
- Years active: 2010–present

Kickboxing record
- Total: 75
- Wins: 70
- By knockout: 14
- Losses: 5
- By knockout: 1
- Draws: 0

Other information
- Notable students: Liu Ce

Wei Rui (simplified Chinese: 魏锐; traditional Chinese: 魏銳; pinyin: wèi ruì, born June 28, 1989) is a Chinese Sanda kickboxer who fights out of Da Dong Xiang fight club. On February 25, 2017, he won the K-1 World GP Lightweight Champions belt making him China's first K-1 World Champion.

As of September 2022, he is ranked the #3 featherweight and #7 pound-for-pound fighter in the world by Combat Press. He was the 2020 Combat Press "Male Fighter of the Year".

== Background ==
Wei Rui was born on May 25, 1989, into a poor rural family as the youngest of eight siblings, with five sisters and two brothers in Luyi, Henan. The financial struggles of his family along with his disinterest in attending school led to him to pursue martial arts at the Luyi Shaolin Wenwu School. Here he trained and competed in Sanda for two years until he left the school to seek employment in order to support his family. With his martial arts background, Wei managed to get a job as a security guard when he moved to Beijing which he later quit after his dissatisfaction with the state of his career. This motivated him to travel to Liaoning and train at the Liaoyang Sports School to compete in Sanda once again. After winning a number of provincial championships he was invited back to the Luyi Shaolin Wenwu School in his home province to represent them in the 2010 and 2011 Shenzhen Sanda Boxing Association Championships winning both tournaments respectively. Wei's newfound success in Sanda led him to make the transition into competing internationally under kickboxing rules.

== Career ==
=== Early career ===
Rui made his debut on September 13, 2013, against Charlie at Wu Lin Feng. He won the fight by knockout, after just three seconds. He would win his next three fights, before suffering his first professional loss to Lerdsila Chumpairtour, at Kunlun Fight 2, by unanimous decision.

He rebounded by winning his next five fights, before challenging Kaiwanlek Tor Laksong for the S1 Muaythai Super Lightweight International title. Kaiwanlek won by unanimous decision.

=== Wu Lin Feng ===
After this loss, Rui participated in the 2014 Wu Lin Feng tournament, to determine the 63 kg International champion. He beat Denis Puric by a second-round knockout in the semifinals, and Anson Chin by unanimous decision in the finals. Rui extended his winning streak to seven fights with knockout victories over DuoLra, Abdel Aziz Ennahachi and Josh Cunanan, as well as through decision victories over Yodsing Po.To.Oo.Pan hok and Casanova Lubo. He would then enter the 2015 WLF 63 kg Qualification tournament. Rui won the tournament with unanimous decision victories against Mahdi Mahmoudvand and Bohdan Kopkin in the semifinals and finals respectively.

After qualifying for the main tournament, Rui was scheduled to fight Chris Wells at the WLF New Zealand vs China event. Rui won the fight by unanimous decision. A month later, he was scheduled to fight Buray Bozaryilmaz, whom he beat by decision. Rui fought in Las Vegas for the first time during the WLF and WCK Muaythai crossover event, being scheduled to face Kronphet Phetrachapat. He beat Kronphet by split decision.

On December 5, 2015, Rui fought in the WLF World 63 kg Tournament. In the tournament semifinals, Rui defeated Pakorn PKSaenchaimuaythaigym by unanimous decision. Advancing to the finals, Rui faced Deng Zeqi. He beat Zeqi by a fourth-round TKO.

=== K-1 title reign ===
Rui continued his undefeated streak over the course of the next year, winning eleven straight fights, most notably winning a decision against the future Glory Featherweight Champion Petpanomrung Kiatmuu9. Rui then participated in the K-1 Lightweight Grand Prix, being scheduled to face Daizo Sasaki in the quarterfinals. He knocked out Sasaki, and won a unanimous decision against Cristian Spetcu in the semifinals. Advancing to the finals, he fought Ren Hiramoto, beating him by split decision.

Rui defended the title four months later, with a majority decision win against Gonnapar Weerasakreck.

On September 23, 2017, Rui fought Thanonchai Thanakorngym in the Glory of Heroes 63 kg tournament semifinals. He beat Thanonchai by unanimous decision.

During the Glory of Heroes: China VS Spain event, Rui was scheduled to fight Jesus Romero for the Superlightweight Strikers League World title. He beat Romero by unanimous decision.

During Glory of Heroes: Guangzhou, Rui scored a 60 second knockout of Phosa Nopphorn.

At K-1: K'FESTA.1, Rui was scheduled to make his second title defense, against the former K-1 Lightweight champion Koya Urabe. Urabe won the fight by knockout mid-way through the second round. It was the first knockout loss of Rui's career.

=== Return to Wu Lin Feng ===
On July 7, 2018, Rui fought a rematch with Deng Zeqi in the Glory of Heroes 63 kg Tournament finals. He once again beat Zeqi by stoppage, knocking him out in the second round. Three weeks later, Rui notched another knockout victory, stopping Sasa Jovanovic mid-way through the second round. At Glory of Heroes 34, he won a unanimous decision against Vadim Zadnipryanyi.

After five more victories under the GoH banner, Rui returned to Wu Lin Feng. He was scheduled to fight Wang Pengfei in his promotional return. He won the fight by unanimous decision. In his next three fights, Rui won decisions against Liu Xiangming, Zhao Chuanlin and Jia Aoqi.

On October 18, 2020, Rui fought Jin Ying for the Wu Lin Feng King's Super Cup Title. He beat Ying by unanimous decision.

Two months later, Rui was scheduled to fight Thodkhui MR.Manas, whom he beat by a second-round head kick knockout. Rui extended his undefeated streak to 15 fights with a unanimous decision victory over Zheng Junfeng. Rui was then scheduled to fight Liu Wei at Wu Lin Feng 516. Rui won the fight by an extra round decision.

Rui was booked to face DFS Lightweight Champion Adrian Maxim at Wu Lin Feng 2023: Chinese New Year on February 4, 2023. He won the fight by unanimous decision. Rui next faced Hisaki Higashimoto at Wu Lin Feng 536: China vs Japan on April 22, 2023. He won the fight by unanimous decision.

=== ONE Championship ===
On March 13, 2024, it was announced that Rui signed with ONE Championship.

Rui faced Hiroki Akimoto on May 4, 2024, at ONE Fight Night 22. He won the fight via unanimous decision.

Rui faced Jonathan Haggerty for the ONE Bantamweight Kickboxing World Championship on February 20, 2025, at ONE 171. He lost the fight via unanimous decision.

On June 9, 2026, it was reported that Rui was released by ONE Championship.

== Championships and awards ==
=== Kickboxing ===
- Glory of Heroes
  - 2018 GOH Junior Featherweight (-63kg) World Champion
- K-1
  - K-1 Lightweight Champion -62.5 kg (first; 1 defense)
  - 2017 K-1 World GP -62.5kg World Tournament Champion
- Wu Lin Feng
  - 2015 WLF World Championship Champions -63 kg
  - 2014 WLF Men's intercontinental champion -63 kg
  - 2013 Wu Lin Feng Rookie King Champions -60 kg
  - 2020 Wu Lin Feng -65 kg King's Super Cup Winner
  - 2020 Wu Lin Feng Fighter of the Year
- Strikers League
  - 2017 Superlightweight Strikers League World Championship -63.5 kg
- Amateur Kickboxing
  - 2013 Chinese Kickboxing Championships (gold) -67 kg
  - 2012 Chinese Kickboxing Championships (silver) -60 kg

Ranking

- N°3 Combat Press.com at Bantamweight, April, 2018
- N°5 Liver Kick.com at Featherweight, March 12, 2018

=== Sanda ===
- Shenzhen Sanda Boxing Association
  - 2011 Shenzhen Sanda Boxing Association International Tournament Champion
  - 2010 Shenzhen Sanda Boxing Association International Tournament Champion
- Amateur Sanda
  - 2007 Liaoning Provincial Sanda Championship (gold) -60 kg
  - 2008 National Youth Wushu Sanda Championship − 5th place

=== Accomplishments ===
- Combatpress.com
  - 2017 Combat Press Kickboxing Awards: Breakout Fighter of the Year
  - 2020 Combat Press Kickboxing Awards: Male Fighter of the Year
- eFight.jp
  - Fighter of the Month (February 2017)

== Fight record ==
Professional Kickboxing Record
70 Wins (26 (T)KO's), 5 Losses
Date	Result	Opponent	Event	Location	Method	Round	Time
2025-11-16	Loss	(Japan) Hiroki Akimoto	ONE 173	Tokyo, Japan	Decision (Unanimous)	3	3:00
2025-02-20	Loss	(United Kingdom) Jonathan Haggerty	ONE 171	Lusail, Qatar	Decision (Unanimous)	5	3:00
For the ONE Bantamweight Kickboxing World Championship.
2024-05-03	Win	(Japan) Hiroki Akimoto	ONE Fight Night 22	Bangkok, Thailand	Decision (Unanimous)	3	3:00
2023-04-22	Win	(Japan) Hisaki Higashimoto	Wu Lin Feng 536: China vs Japan	Tangshan, China	Decision (Unanimous)	3	3:00
2023-02-04	Win	(Romania) Adrian Maxim	Wu Lin Feng 2023: Chinese New Year	Tangshan, China	Decision (Unanimous)	3	3:00
2022-04-11	Win	(Cambodia) Phal Sophorn	Wu Lin Feng 529: Cambodia	Angkor, Cambodia	Decision	3	3:00
2022-01-01	Win	(Russia) Sergei Lutchenko	Wu Lin Feng 527	Tangshan, China	Decision (Unanimous)	3	3:00
2021-10-30	Win	(Iran) Moslem Lashani	Wu Lin Feng 2021: WLF on Haihua Island	Daizhou, China	TKO (Straight Left)	1	2:02
2021-03-27	Win	(China) Liu Wei	Wu Lin Feng 2021: World Contender League 1st Stage	China	Ext.R Decision	4	3:00
2021-01-23	Win	(China) Zheng Junfeng	Wu Lin Feng 2021: Global Kung Fu Festival	Macao, China	Decision (Unanimous)	3	3:00
2020-12-22	Win	(Thailand) Thodkhui MR.Manas	Wu Lin Feng 2020: Women's 52kg Championship Tournament	Zhengzhou, China	KO (Left Head Kick)	2	
2020-10-18	Win	(China) Jin Ying	Wu Lin Feng 2020: King's Super Cup Final	Zhengzhou, China	Decision (Unanimous)	3	3:00
Wins the Wu Lin Feng -65kg Kings Super Cup.
2020-09-23	Win	(China) Jia Aoqi	Wu Lin Feng 2020: King's Super Cup 5th Group Stage	Zhengzhou, China	Decision (Unanimous)	3	3:00
2020-09-05	Win	(China) Zhao Chuanlin	Huya Kung Fu Carnival 2	Guangzhou, China	Decision (Unanimous)	3	3:00
2020-08-03	Win	(China) Liu Xiangming	Wu Lin Feng 2020: King's Super Cup 4th Group Stage	Zhengzhou, China	Decision (Unanimous)	3	3:00
2020-06-13	Win	(China) Wang Pengfei	Wu Lin Feng 2020: King's Super Cup 2nd Group Stage	Zhengzhou, China	Decision (Unanimous)	3	3:00
2020-01-04	Win	(Italy) Domenico Lomurno	Glory Of Heroes 45	Haikou, China	KO (Left Knee to the body)	2	2:02
2019-12-28	Win	(Iran) Ali Farahzad	Glory Of Heroes 44	China	KO (Flying Left Head Kick)	2	2:08
2019-11-10	Win	(Russia) Vadim Gumerov	Glory Of Heroes 42	Puyang, China	KO (Right Hook)	1	2:40
2019-05-25	Win	(Norway) Simon Santana	Glory of Heroes 38: Shantou	Guangdong, China	Decision (Unanimous)	3	3:00
2018-09-15	Win	(Ukraine) Vadim Zadnipryanyi	Glory of Heroes 34: Tongling	Anhui, China	Decision (Unanimous)	3	3:00
2018-07-28	Win	(Austria) Sasa Jovanovic	Glory of Heroes 33: Shanghai	Shanghai, China	KO (Right Hook Kick)	2	2:12
2018-07-07	Win	(China) Deng Zeqi	Glory of Heroes 32: Huizhou - GOH 63 kg Championship Tournament, Finals	Guangdong, China	KO (Left Knee to the Body)	2	1:58
Wins the GOH Junior Featherweight (-63kg) World title.
2018-03-21	Loss	(Japan) Koya Urabe	K-1 World GP 2018: K'FESTA.1	Saitama, Japan	KO (Straight Left)	2	1:12
Lost the K-1 Lightweight (-62.5kg) Championship.
2018-01-13	Win	(Thailand) Phosa Nopphorn	Glory of Heroes: Guangzhou	Guangzhou, China	KO (Right Hook)	1	1:00
2017-11-11	Win	(Spain) Jesus Romero	Glory of Heroes: China VS Spain / Strikers League: Madrid	Madrid, Spain	Decision (Unanimous)	3	3:00
Wins the Superlightweight Strikers League World -63.5kg title.
2017-09-23	Win	(Thailand) Thanonchai Thanakorngym	Glory of Heroes: Luoyang - GOH 63 kg Championship Tournament, Semi-Finals	Luoyang, Henan	Decision (Unanimous)	3	3:00
2017-06-18	Win	(Thailand) Kongnapa Weerasakreck	K-1 World GP 2017 Super Middleweight Championship Tournament	Tokyo, Japan	Decision (Majority)	3	3:00
Defended the K-1 Lightweight (-62.5kg) Championship.
2017-04-28	Win	(Thailand) Narongwut Kaeongam	Rise of Heroes: Chengde	Chengde, Hebei, China	TKO (Left Low Kick)	2	
2017-02-25	Win	(Japan) Ren Hiramoto	K-1 World GP 2017 Lightweight Championship Tournament, Final	Tokyo, Japan	Decision (Split)	3	3:00
Wins the K-1 Lightweight Championship and the K-1 World GP -62.5kg World Tournament.
2017-02-25	Win	(Romania) Cristian Spetcu	K-1 World GP 2017 Lightweight Championship Tournament, Semi Finals	Tokyo, Japan	Decision (Unanimous)	3	3:00
2017-02-25	Win	(Japan) Daizo Sasaki	K-1 World GP 2017 Lightweight Championship Tournament, Quarter Finals	Tokyo, Japan	KO (Left Hook)	2	1:04
2017-01-14	Win	(Thailand) Petpanomrung Kiatmuu9	Glory of Heroes 6	Jiyuan, China	Ex.R Decision (Unanimous)	4	3:00
2016-10-29	Win	(Thailand) Piyawong Kaliku	Rise of Heroes 3	Changji, Xinjiang, China	TKO (Left Hook/Referee Stoppage)	2	1:24
2016-10-01	Win	(Thailand) Kaiwanlek Tor Laksong	Glory of Heroes 5	Zhengzhou, China	TKO (Left Head Kick)	3	
2016-09-17	Win	(Belarus) Maksim Petkevich	Rise of Heroes 1	Chaoyang, Liaoning, China	Ex.R Decision (Unanimous)	4	3:00
2016-08-06	Win	(Italy) Matteo Taccini	Glory of Heroes 4	Changzhi, China	Decision (Unanimous)	3	3:00
2016-07-02	Win	(Spain) Khyzer Hayat Nawaz	Glory of Heroes 3	Jiyuan, China	Decision (Unanimous)	3	3:00
2016-06-04	Win	(Japan) Kenta Hayashi	Wu Lin Feng vs Krush	Zhengzhou, China	KO (Straight Left)	3	
2016-05-07	Win	(China) Ban Yungsong	Glory of Heroes 2	Shenzhen, China	Decision (Unanimous)	3	3:00
2016-04-02	Win	(Japan) Yukiya Nakamura	Glory of Heroes 1	Shenzhen, China	KO (Flying Knee)	1	1:10
2016-03-05	Win	(Japan) Yusuke Shimada	Wu Lin Feng 2016	Zhengzhou, China	KO (Left Head Kick)	1	
2016-01-23	Win	(Thailand) Pakorn PKSaenchaimuaythaigym	Wu Lin Feng 2016: World Kickboxing Championship in Shanghai	Shanghai, China	Decision (Unanimous)	3	3:00
2015-12-05	Win	(China) Deng Zeqi	WLF World Championship 2015 -63 kg Tournament, Finals	Zhengzhou, China	TKO (Punches)	4	
Wins the WLF World Championship Tournament -63 kg title.
2015-12-05	Win	(Thailand) Pakorn PKSaenchaimuaythaigym	WLF World Championship 2015 -63 kg Tournament, Semi Finals	Zhengzhou, China	Decision (Unanimous)	3	3:00
2015-11-13	Win	(Thailand) Kronphet Phetrachapat	Wu Lin Feng & WCK Muaythai: China vs USA	Las Vegas, USA	Decision (Split)	3	3:00
2015-10-24	Win	(Netherlands) Buray Bozaryilmaz	Wu Lin Feng 2015	Hong Kong, China	Decision (Unanimous)	3	3:00
2015-09-19	Win	(New Zealand) Chris Wells	Wu Lin Feng 2015 – New Zealand vs China	Auckland, New Zealand	Decision (Unanimous)	3	3:00
2015-08-01	Win	(Ukraine) Bohdan Kopkin	WLF World Championship 2015 -63 kg Tournament, Quarter Finals	Zhengzhou, China	Decision (Unanimous)	3	3:00
Qualified for the 2015 WLF World Championship -63kg Tournament Final.
2015-08-01	Win	(Iran) Mahdi Mahmoudvand	WLF World Championship 2015 -63 kg Tournament, First Round	Zhengzhou, China	Decision (Unanimous)	3	3:00
2014-12-05	Win	(Thailand) Yodsing Po.To.Oo.Pan hok	Wu Lin Feng 2014 – King’s Cup 2014	Bangkok, Thailand	Decision (Unanimous)	3	3:00
2014-11-01	Win	(United States) Josh Cunanan	Wu Lin Feng & WCK Muaythai: China vs USA	Las Vegas, USA	TKO (Straight Left/Referee Stoppage)	1	
2014-10-04	Win	(Brazil) Julio Lobo	Wu Lin Feng 2014	Wenling, China	Decision (Unanimous)	3	3:00
2014-09-28	Win	(Netherlands) Abdel Aziz Ennahachi	Wu Lin Feng 2014 – Netherlands vs China	Zaandam, Netherlands	TKO (Left Low Kick)	2	
2014-09-09	Win	(Laos) DuoLra	Wu Lin Feng 2014	Huoerguosi, China	KO (Right Hook Kick)	1	
2014-08-30	Win	(Hong Kong) Qian Yizhong	Wu Lin Feng 2014 International Champion– 63 kg Tournament, Finals	Hong Kong, China	Decision (Unanimous)	3	3:00
Wins the Wu Lin Feng International -63 kg title.
2014-08-30	Win	(Canada) Denis Puric	Wu Lin Feng 2014 International Champion– 63 kg Tournament, Semi Finals	Hong Kong, China	KO (Left Knee to the Body)	2	
2014-08-12	Loss	(Thailand) Kaiwanlek Tor Laksong	Wu Lin Feng & Thailand Queen’s Cup 2014	Bangkok, Thailand	Decision (Unanimous)	3	3:00
For the S1 Muaythai Super Lightweight International title.
2014-07-26	Win	(Kazakhstan) Nurgalliyev Hanaharti	Wu Lin Feng 2014	Astana, Kazakhstan	Decision (Unanimous)	3	3:00
2014-06-14	Win	(Republic of Ireland) David Wogan	Wu Lin Feng 2014	Dublin, Ireland	TKO (Corner Stoppage)	2	0:00
2014-05-23	Win	(Laos) Longchai	Wu Lin Feng 2014	Luoyang, China	KO (Right hook to the Body)		
2014-05-10	Win	(Germany) Johann Dederer	Wu Lin Feng 2014 - Day of Destruction 8	Hamburg, Germany	TKO (Left Low Kicks)	1	
2014-03-07	Win	(Myanmar) Tucker	Wu Lin Feng 2014	Hangzhou, China	Decision (Unanimous)	3	3:00
2014-02-16	Loss	(Thailand) Lerdsila Chumpairtour	Wu Lin Feng & Kunlun Fight 2 & MAX Muay Thai 6	Zhengzhou, China	Decision (Unanimous)	3	3:00
2014-01-26	Win	(United Kingdom) Francis	Wu Lin Feng 2014	Beijing, China	TKO		
2013-12-02	Win	(Germany) Walloon Gaish	Wu Lin Feng 2013	Bengbu, China	Decision (Unanimous)	3	3:00
2013-10-12	Win	(Russia) Emma	Wu Lin Feng 2013	Zhengzhou, China	TKO (Left Spinning Back Fist)	2	
2013-09-13	Win	(Thailand) Charlie	Wu Lin Feng 2013	Wenzhou, China	KO	1	0:03
Legend: Win Loss Draw/No contest Notes

== Mixed martial arts record ==
Professional record breakdown
1 match	0 wins	1 loss
By knockout	0	0
By submission	0	1
By decision	0	0

Res.	Record	Opponent	Method	Event	Date	Round	Time	Location	Notes
Loss	0–1	Adib Nazrishoev	Submission (Rear Naked Choke)	Glory of Heroes 35: Meishan	October 12, 2018	1	3:41	Sichuan, China	

== Mixed rules record ==
Professional record breakdown
1 match	0 wins	0 losses
By knockout	0	0
By submission	0	0
By decision	0	0
Draws	1	

Res.	Record	Opponent	Method	Event	Date	Round	Time	Location	Notes
Draw	0–0-1	(New Zealand) Jeffrey Kelly	Draw	Glory Of Heroes 37: New Zealand	April 12, 2019	4	2:00	New Zealand	Mixed rules bout starting with 2 rounds under boxing rules followed by 2 rounds under kickboxing rules.
