= Stavros Exakoustidis =

Greek kickboxer

- Born: Σταύρος Εξακουστίδης; July 3, 1987 (age 39); Greece
- Other names: Nirvana
- Nationality: Greek
- Height: 166 cm (5 ft 5 in)
- Weight: 60.0 kg (132.3 lb; 9.45 st)
- Style: Kickboxing
- Stance: Southpaw
- Fighting out of: Greece
- Team: Nasos, Mejiro Gym

Kickboxing record
- Total: 51
- Wins: 35
- By knockout: 15
- Losses: 16
- By knockout: 2

Stavros Exakoustidis (born 3 July 1987) is a Greek kickboxer fighting in the super featherweight division of K-1.

== Kickboxing career ==
=== Early career ===
==== Superkombat Fighting Championship ====
Exakoustidis was scheduled to challenge Qasim Nisar for the ICO Professional World Super Lightweight title at Full Contact on November 23, 2014. He lost the fight by unanimous decision.

Exakoustidis was scheduled to face Nikos Hysen at Best fighter 2015 on February 21, 2015. He lost the fight by unanimous decision.

Exakoustidis returned to winning ways by defeating Pietro Doorje by decision at Gladiator Nights 9 on April 7, 2015. He was next scheduled to face Cristian Spetcu at SUPERKOMBAT World Grand Prix II on May 7, 2016. Exakoustidis won the fight by unanimous decision. Exakoustidis was scheduled to face Deng Zeqi at Glory of Heroes 4 on August 6, 2016. He won the fight by a second-round technical knockout. The two of them fought at immediate rematch at Glory of Heroes 6 on January 14, 2017. Zeqi won the rematch by a second-round technical knockout.

=== K-1 ===
Exakoustidis was scheduled to make his K-1 debut against Taiga Kawabe at K-1 World GP 2017 Welterweight Championship Tournament on September 18, 2017. He won the fight by a first-round technical knockout.

Exakoustidis was scheduled to face Kosuke Komiyama at K-1 World GP 2017 Heavyweight Championship Tournament on November 23, 2017. He lost the fight by unanimous decision. Exakoustidis was next scheduled to face Takeru Segawa at K-1 World GP 2018: K'FESTA.1, in the semifinals of the K-1 super featherweight tournament. He lost the fight by unanimous decision.

Exakoustidis was scheduled to face Koji at K-1 World GP 2018: inaugural Cruiserweight Championship Tournament on September 24, 2018. He lost the fight by unanimous decision.

Exakoustidis then returned to his native Greece to challenge Jonathan Invernino for the ICO Professional World Super Lightweight title at Open Championship on March 16, 2019. He won the fight by a first-round technical knockout.

Exakoustidis was scheduled to face Toshi at GRACHAN 40 × BFC vol.3 on June 2, 2019. He won the fight by a second-round technical knockout.

Exakoustidis was scheduled to face Tatsuya Oiwa at K-1 World GP 2019 Japan: ～Women's Flyweight Championship Tournament～ on December 28, 2019. He lost the fight by unanimous decision.

Exakoustidis faced Tomoya Yokoyama in the 2022 K-1 Super Featherweight World Grand Prix at K-1 World GP 2022 Yokohamatsuri on September 11, 2022. He stepped in as a replacement for Bailey Sugden, who withdrew with an injury. He lost the fight by a third-round knockout.

== Titles and accomplishments ==
- 2019 ICO Professional World Super Lightweight Champion
- 2010 WAKO European Champion
- 2006 ISKA World Champion
- 2005 WPO World Champion

== Professional kickboxing record ==
Professional kickboxing record
35 wins (15 (T)KOs), 16 losses, 0 draws, 0 no contests
Date	Result	Opponent	Event	Location	Method	Round	Time
2022-09-11	Loss	(Japan) Tomoya Yokoyama	K-1 World GP 2022 Yokohamatsuri, Tournament Quarterfinals	Yokohama, Japan	KO (high kick)	3	1:41
2019-12-28	Loss	(Japan) Tatsuya Oiwa	K-1 World GP 2019 Japan: ～Women's Flyweight Championship Tournament～	Nagoya, Japan	Decision (unanimous)	3	3:00
2019-06-02	Win	(Japan) Toshi	GRACHAN 40 × BFC vol.3	Tokyo, Japan	TKO (low kick)	2	2:16
2019-03-16	Win	(Italy) Jonathan Invernino	Open Championship	Greece	TKO	1	
Wins the ICO Professional World Super Lightweight title.
2018-09-24	Loss	(Japan) Koji	K-1 World GP 2018: inaugural Cruiserweight Championship Tournament	Saitama, Japan	Decision	3	3:00
2018-05-12	Win	(Italy) Alex Avogadro	La Notte Dei Campioni	Italy	Decision	3	3:00
2018-03-21	Loss	(Japan) Takeru	K-1 World GP 2018: K'FESTA.1 -60 kg World Tournament, Quarter Finals	Saitama, Japan	Decision (unanimous)	3	3:00
2017-11-23	Loss	(Japan) Kosuke Komiyama	K-1 World GP 2017 Heavyweight Championship Tournament	Japan	Decision (unanimous)	3	3:00
2017-09-18	Win	(Japan) Taiga	K-1 World GP 2017 Welterweight Championship Tournament	Tokyo, Japan	KO (three knockdowns/left hook)	1	2:41
2017-04-22	Loss	(France) Youssouf Binate	Partouche Kickboxing Tour 2017, Semi Final	France	Decision	3	3:00
2017-01-14	Loss	(China) Deng Zeqi	Glory of Heroes 6	Jiyuan, China	TKO (right hook)	2	0:10
2016-08-06	Win	(China) Deng Zeqi	Glory of Heroes 4	Changzhi, China	TKO	2	
2016-05-07	Win	(Romania) Cristian Spetcu	SUPERKOMBAT World Grand Prix II	Bucharest, Romania	Decision (unanimous)	3	3:00
2015-04	Win	(Netherlands) Pietro Doorje	Gladiator Nights 9	Greece	Decision	3	3:00
2015-02-21	Win	(Greece) Nikos Hysen	Best fighter 2015	Greece	Decision (unanimous)	3	3:00
2014-11-23	Loss	(England) Qasim Nisar	Full Contact	England	Decision (unanimous)	10	2:00
For the ICO Professional World Super Lightweight title.
2014-03-29	Loss	(Romania) Ionuț Atodiresei	SuperKombat New Heroes	Romania	Decision	3	3:00
2013-11-30	Loss	(Greece) Thanasios Karousos	Best fighter 2013	Greece	Decision	3	3:00
2013-06-02	Win	(Turkey) Mohammad Usman	KIMBO 1	Greece	KO (left hook)	2	
2013-05-18	Win	(Romania) Ionuț Atodiresei	SuperKombat World Grand Prix II 2013	Craiova, Romania	TKO (referee stoppage)	2	2:59
2013-03-03	Loss	(Greece) Kostas Mirzaev	Fightsports Tournament, Semi Final	Greece	Decision	3	3:00
2012-12-15	Win	(Greece) Dionisis Gkikas	K-1 World MAX 2012 World Championship Tournament Final	Athens, Greece	Decision (unanimous)	3	3:00
2012-06	Win	(Greece) Nikos Syllas	The Battle 3, Final	Greece			
2012-06	Win	(Greece) Kostas Mirzaev	The Battle 3, Semi Final	Greece	Decision	3	3:00
2012-04-01	Win	(Turkey) Yasih Denir	Gladiator Nights 6	Greece	Decision	3	3:00
2012	Win	(Greece) Haris Gasteratos	JOYA Kickboxing Championship	Greece			
2011	Win	(Greece) Nikos Gikas	The Battle 3	Athens, Greece	Decision (unanimous)	3	3:00
2011-04-10	Win	(Turkey) Kadir Yener	Gladiatior Nights 5	Athens, Greece	KO (left hook)	2	
2011-03	Win	(Greece) Nikos Gikas	Iron Challenge 2	Athens, Greece	Decision (unanimous)	3	3:00
2010-02-27	Loss	(Albania) Florian Marku	No Limits 10	Greece	Decision	3	3:00
2009-10-24	Win	(Germany) Viktor Harder	Kings Cup	Germany			
2009-09-26	Win	(Greece) Thanasis Karagos	Adidas Championship	Greece	Decision	3	3:00
2009	Loss	(Germany) Alex Vogel	H-1 Last Chance	Germany	Decision	3	3:00
2009-03-22	Win	(Netherlands) Ruben Narain	Gladiatior Nights 3	Athens, Greece	Decision	3	3:00
2008-08-14	Win	(Netherlands) Roël Rink	No Limits 5	Greece	TKO	1	
Legend: Win Loss Draw/no contest Notes

== See also ==
- List of male kickboxers
