= Yun Qi =

Chinese Sanshou kickboxer

- Born: December 7, 1995 (age 30); Henan, China
- Native name: 贠奇
- Other names: "Flying Knee King"
- Nationality: China
- Height: 1.72 m (5 ft 7 1/2 in)
- Weight: 60.0 kg (132.3 lb; 9.45 st)
- Division: Bantamweight
- Style: Sanda, Kickboxing
- Stance: Orthodox
- Fighting out of: Zhengzhou, China
- Team: Da Dong Xiang Fight Club (present)
- Trainer: Zhao Shijie

Kickboxing record
- Total: 43
- Wins: 28
- By knockout: 9
- Losses: 15
- Draws: 0

Mixed martial arts record
- Total: 1
- Wins: 0
- Losses: 1
- By knockout: 1

Yun Qi (贠奇, born December 7, 1995) is a Bantamweight Chinese Sanda kickboxer who has fought in Wu Lin Feng, K-1, Krush, and Glory of Heroes. He has notable wins over the likes of Kosuke Komiyama, Masahiro Yamamoto, and Sergio Wielzen.

== Career ==
March 3, 2017 in Tokyo, Japan Krush.74, Yun Qi challenged Kaito Ozawa for the Krush -58 kg World Championship belt. The fight was close with Ozawa being declared the victor by majority decision.

== Championships and awards ==
Kickboxing

- Wu Lin Feng
  - 2014 WLF -60 kg Rookie of the Year
- Glory of Heroes
  - 2016 GOH -60 kg Tournament Runner-Up

== Kickboxing record ==
Kickboxing record
29 Wins (10 (T)KO's), 17 Losses, 0 Draw
Date	Result	Opponent	Event	Location	Method	Round	Time
2020-01-04	Loss	(Belarus) Artsem	Glory of Heroes 45	Haikou, China	Decision	3	3:00
2019-12-20	Loss	(Greece) Olsjan Mesoutaj	Glory of Heroes 43 - Gods of War XIII	Greece	Decision	3	3:00
2019-09-07	Win	(Iran) Hassan	Glory of Heroes 41	China	TKO		
2019-05-25	Win	(New Zealand) Nikora Lee-Kingi	Glory of Heroes 38: Shantou	Shantou, China	Decision (Unanimous)	3	3:00
2018-10-20	Loss	(China) Feng Liang	Glory of Heroes 36: Ziyang	Sichuan, China	Decision (Unanimous)	3	3:00
For the GOH Bantamweight Championship -60 kg.
2018-09-15	Win	(China) Zheng Junfeng	Glory of Heroes 34: Tongling	Tongling, China	Decision (Unanimous)	3	3:00
2018-05-26	Win	(Japan) Masahiro Yamamoto	Glory of Heroes 31: Beijing	Beijing, China	Decision (Unanimous)	3	3:00
2018-02-03	Win	(Thailand) Sudsakhorn	Glory of Heroes: Chengdu	Chengdu, China	KO	1	0:22
2017-12-23	Loss	(France) Hakim Hamech	Glory Of Heroes	China	Decision	3	3:00
2017-07-16	Loss	(Japan) Sano Tenma	Krush 77	Tokyo, Japan	Decision (Unanimous)	3	3:00
2017-04-28	Win	(Thailand) Pakkalck	Rise of Heroes / Conquest of Heroes: Chengde	Chengde, China	KO	1	2:57
2017-03-03	Loss	(Japan) Kaito Ozawa	Krush.74	Tokyo, Japan	Decision (Majority)	3	3:00
For the Krush -58 kg title.
2016-12-17	Win	(Philippines) Jay Marrube	Glory of Heroes Rise of Heroes 5	Nanning, China	TKO (Leg Kick)	3	1:49
2016-11-03	Loss	(Japan) Takeru Segawa	K-1 World GP 2016 Super Featherweight World Tournament, Semi Finals	Tokyo, Japan	KO (Right Cross)	2	2:31
2016-11-03	Win	(Japan) Shota Kanbe	K-1 World GP 2016 Super Featherweight World Tournament, Quarter Finals	Tokyo, Japan	TKO (Referee Stoppage/Left Flying Knee)	3	1:32
2016-10-29	Win	(Iran) Zarin Omid	Wu Lin Feng	China	KO		
2016-09-17	Loss	(China) Feng Liang	Glory of Heroes Rise of Heroes 1: -60 kg Tournament Finals	Chaoyang, China	Ex. R Decision (Split)	4	3:00
For the Glory of Heroes -60 kg Tournament.
2016-09-17	Win	(Moldova) Dmitrii Sîrbu	Glory of Heroes Rise of Heroes 1: -60 kg Tournament Semi Finals	Chaoyang, China	Ex. R Decision (Unanimous)	4	3:00
2016-08-06	Win	(Belarus) Kruk Yauhen	Glory of Heroes Rise of Heroes 4	Changzhi, China	TKO	1	
2016-06-24	Win	(Japan) Kosuke Komiyama	K-1 World GP 2016 -65kg World Tournament	Tokyo, Japan	Decision (Majority)	3	3:00
2016-05-07	Win	(Suriname) Sergio Wielzen	Glory of Heroes 2	Shenzhen, China	Decision	3	3:00
2015-02-07	Loss	(China) Xiatekal Wumaneral	Wu Lin Feng	China	Decision	3	3:00
2014-01-25	Win	(China) Yang Shisong	Wu Lin Feng	China	TKO (High kick)	3	
Legend: Win Loss Draw/No contest Notes

== Mixed martial arts record ==
Professional record breakdown
1 match	0 wins	1 loss
By knockout	0	1
By submission	0	0
By decision	0	0

Res.	Record	Opponent	Method	Event	Date	Round	Time	Location	Notes
Loss	0–1	Nikora Lee-Kingi	Knockout (Punches)	Glory of Heroes 37: New Zealand	April 16, 2019	2	2:44	Auckland, New Zealand	
