= 2018 in Glory of Heroes =

Information
- First date: January 6, 2018
- Last date: TBA

Events
- Total events: TBA

Glory of Heroes by Wanmingyang Media is a kickboxing promotion, The first event in 2018 was on January 6, 2018 at the Wudang International Wushu Exchange Center in Hubei, China.

== List of events ==
No.	Event	Date	Venue	City
11	Glory of Heroes 36: Ziyang	October 20, 2018	Ziyang Gymnasium	Sichuan, China
10	Glory of Heroes 35: Meishan	October 12, 2018	Meishan Gymnasium	Sichuan, China
09	Glory of Heroes 34: Tongling	September 15, 2018	Tongling Sports Center	Anhui, China
08	Glory of Heroes 33: Shanghai	July 28, 2018	Shanghai Baoshan Gymnasium	Shanghai, China
07	Glory of Heroes 32: Huizhou	July 7, 2018	Huiyang Sports Exhibition Center	Guangdong, China
06	Glory of Heroes 31: Beijing	May 26, 2018	Beijing Police Academy	Beijing, China
05	Glory of Heroes: New Zealand vs China	March 3, 2018	ASB Stadium	Auckland, New Zealand
04	Glory of Heroes: Chengdu	February 3, 2018	Sichuan International Tennis Center	Chengdu, China
03	Glory of Heroes: Qingdao	January 27, 2018	China University of Petroleum Huadong Gymnasium	Qingdao, China
02	Glory of Heroes: Guangzhou	January 13, 2018	Guangzhou University Town Sports Cent	Guangzhou, China
01	Glory of Heroes: Wudang Mountain	January 6, 2018	Wudang International Wushu Exchange Center	Hubei, China

== Glory of Heroes 36: Ziyang ==
Glory of Heroes 36: Ziyang
- Promotion: Glory of Heroes
- Date: October 20, 2018
- Venue: Ziyang Gymnasium
- City: Sichuan, China

Event chronology
Glory of Heroes 35: Meishan	Glory of Heroes 36: Ziyang	Glory of Heroes 37

Glory of Heroes 36: Ziyang was a kickboxing and MMA event held on October 20, 2018 at the Ziyang Gymnasium in Sichuan, China.

=== Results ===
Glory of Heroes 36
Weight Class				Method	Round	Time	Notes
MMA Flyweight	(China) Yin Shuai	def.	(Russia) Yevgen Kraminskyi	Submission	2		
MMA Bantamweight	(China) Shi Xiaoyu	def.	(Belarus) Uladzislau	Submission	2		
MMA Lightweight	(Brazil) Leandro Rodrigues	def.	(China) He Nannan	Submission	2		
Lightweight	(China) Han Wenbao	def.	(France) Damien Cazambo	Decision (Unanimous)	3	3:00	
Lightweight	(China) Shuai Qi	def.	(Thailand) Mingkwan	TKO	1		
Bantamweight	(China) Zheng Junfeng	def.	(Ukraine) Melnyk vladyslav	Decision (Unanimous)	3	3:00	
Cold weapon combat	(China) Wang Jiyu (Bagua Sword)	def.	(China) Xu Guorui (Tai Dao)	27-19	2	2:00	
Women's Flyweight	(France) Anaëlle Angerville	def.	(China) Yang Yang	Decision (Unanimous)	3	3:00	
Light Middleweight	(China) Zhao Chunyang	def.	(Madagascar) Pierre	TKO	1		
Light Bantamweight	(China) Huo Xiaolong	def.	(Iran) Yaser Pormehr	TKO	2		Light Bantamweight Champion Challenge Qualification
Bantamweight	(China) Feng Liang (c)	def.	(China) Yun Qi	Decision (Unanimous)	3	3:00	For the GOH Bantamweight Championship
MMA Bantamweight	(Russia) Alexandr Danilov	def.	(China) Deng Zeqi	Submission (Rear Naked Choke)	1	2:47	
MMA Featherweight	(China) Wang Jizheng	def.	(Kazakhstan) Rustem Yensebayev	Submission (Heel Hook)	1	4:24	
MMA Bantamweight	(China) Cui Liucai	def.	(Tajikistan) Mukhiddin Kholov	Ext. R Decision	4	5:00	
MMA Featherweight	(Norway) Kenneth Evensen	def.	(China) Qiu Jianliang	Submission (Heel Hook)	1	3:45	

== Glory of Heroes 35: Meishan ==
Glory of Heroes 35: Meishan
- Promotion: Glory of Heroes
- Date: October 12, 2018
- Venue: Meishan Gymnasium
- City: Sichuan, China

Event chronology
Glory of Heroes 34: Tongling	Glory of Heroes 35: Meishan	Glory of Heroes 36: Ziyang

Glory of Heroes 35: Meishan was a kickboxing and MMA event held on October 12, 2018 at the Meishan Gymnasium in Sichuan, China.

=== Results ===
Glory of Heroes 35
Weight Class				Method	Round	Time	Notes
Light Bantamweight	(China) An Xinxin	def.	(Ukraine) Yevgen Kraminskyi	Decision (Unanimous)	3	3:00	
MMA Featherweight	(China) Song Shuai	def.	(Thailand) Saikung	Submission	1	2:00	
Light Lightweight	(Thailand) Patipan	def.	(China) Luo Chao	Decision (Unanimous)	3	3:00	
Heavyweight	(Belarus) Shostak Mikita	def.	(China) Liu Ce	Decision (Unanimous)	3	3:00	
Light Middleweight	(Thailand) Sawettapong	def.	(China) Zhang Pengcheng	Decision (Unanimous)	3	3:00	
MMA Middleweight	(China) Shun Feng	def.	(Georgia (country)) Mamuka Chitauri	Submission	1		
MMA Women's Flyweight	(China) Meng Bo	def.	(Egypt) Aya Saied	Submission	1		
Cold weapon combat	(China) Mo Jun (Two handed sword)	def.	(China) Di Jiang (Nordic Tomahawk)	7-2	1	3:00	
Light Lightweight	(China) Guo Mengfei	def.	(Thailand) Seksan	KO	2		
Lightweight	(China) Hao Shengbin	def.	(Iran) Saeid Hossein	TKO	3	0:15	
MMA Bantamweight	(China) Yang Sen	def.	(Brazil) Italo Freitas	Submission	2		
MMA Featherweight	(China) Tie Yinghua	def.	(Belarus) Aliaksei krepets	TKO	2	1:38	
Light Lightweight	(Iran) Iman Alipour	def.	(China) Liao Xin	Decision (Unanimous)	3	3:00	
Featherweight	(China) Zhou Yi	def.	(Iran) Ghasemi Meisam	DQ (Meisam Negative cuddle)	3		
MMA Featherweight	(Georgia (country)) Levan	def.	(China) Ji Xian	Submission (Rear Naked Choke)	2	3:23	
Bantamweight	(Tajikistan) Adib Nazrishoev	def.	(China) Wei Rui	Submission (Rear Naked Choke)	1	3:41	

== Glory of Heroes 34: Tongling ==
Glory of Heroes 34: Tongling
- Promotion: Glory of Heroes
- Date: September 15, 2018
- Venue: Tongling Sports Center
- City: Anhui, China

Event chronology
Glory of Heroes 33: Shanghai	Glory of Heroes 34: Tongling	Glory of Heroes 35: Meishan

Glory of Heroes 34: Tongling was a kickboxing and MMA event held on September 15, 2018 at the Tongling Sports Center in Anhui, China.

=== Results ===
Glory of Heroes 34
Weight Class				Method	Round	Time	Notes
MMA Flyweight 56kg	(China) Yin Shuai	def.	(Japan) Tomoya kobayashi	Submission (Kimura lock)	2		
MMA Bantamweight 60kg	(Tajikistan) Musayev	def.	(China) He Jinhao	Submission (Rear Naked Choke)	1		
MMA Bantamweight 60kg	(China) Shi Xiaoyu	def.	(Japan) Ryo Yanagi	TKO	1		
MMA Featherweight 65kg	(Brazil) Diogo Sotero	def.	(China) Wang Jizheng	Submission (Anaconda choke)	1		
MMA Bantamweight 60kg	(China) Yang Sen	def.	(Japan) Yuya Omura	TKO	1		
MMA Women's Flyweight 56kg	(China) Meng Bo	def.	(Russia) Olga Vlasova	TKO	1		
MMA Bantamweight 60kg	(China) Cui Liucai	def.	(Brazil) Orazgeld	TKO	1		
Light Bantamweight 57kg	(China) Huo Xiaolong	def.	(Thailand) Sathaporn	TKO	2		
Lightweight 70kg	(China) Han Wenbao	def.	(Belarus) Dzmitry	TKO	2		
Light Featherweight 63kg	(China) Deng Zeqi	def.	(Brazil) Italo Freitas	TKO	2		
Women's Flyweight 56kg	(Italy) Chiara Vincis	def.	(China) Yang Yang	Decision (Split)	3	3:00	
Lightweight 70kg	(China) Shuai Qi	def.	(Thailand) Kunchit	Decision (Unanimous)	3	3:00	
Light Lightweight 67kg	(China) Tie Yinghua	def.	(Thailand) Singsuriya Sakchai	KO	3		
Bantamweight 60kg	(China) Yun Qi	def.	(China) Zheng Junfeng	Decision (Unanimous)	3	3:00	Bantamweight Champion Challenge Qualification
Light Featherweight 63kg	(China) Wei Rui	def.	(Ukraine) Vadym	Decision (Unanimous)	3	3:00	
Lightweight 70kg	(Japan) Jimbo Katsuya	def.	(China) Zhao Chunyang	Decision (Unanimous)	3	3:00	
Light Bantamweight 57kg	(China) Wang Junguang	def.	(Russia) Khavazh Oligov	Decision (Unanimous)	3	3:00	
Light Lightweight 67kg	(China) Qiu Jianliang	def.	(Thailand) Narong Bunchan	TKO	3	1:05	Boxing rules

== Glory of Heroes 33: Shanghai ==
Glory of Heroes 33: Shanghai
- Promotion: Glory of Heroes
- Date: July 28, 2018
- Venue: Shanghai Baoshan Gymnasium
- City: Shanghai, China

Event chronology
Glory of Heroes 32: Huizhou	Glory of Heroes 33: Shanghai	Glory of Heroes 34: Tongling

Glory of Heroes 33: Shanghai was a kickboxing and MMA event held on July 28, 2018 at the Shanghai Baoshan Gymnasium in Shanghai, China.

=== Results ===
Glory of Heroes 33
Weight Class				Method	Round	Time	Notes
Bantamweight 60kg	(China) Zheng Junfeng	def.	(Thailand) Thapanapong	Decision (Unanimous)	3	3:00	
Heavyweight 85kg	(Netherlands) Marino Schouten	def.	(China) Liu Ce	Decision (Unanimous)	3	3:00	
Light Featherweight 63kg	(China) Deng Zeqi	def.	(Madagascar) Raza Fazaraly	Decision (Unanimous)	3	3:00	
Light Bantamweight 57kg	(China) Zhao Jiangfeng	def.	(China) An Xinxin	Decision (Unanimous)	3	3:00	GOH - Rise 57kg 32Man Tournament Finals
	(China) Zhang Long	def.	(China) Zheng Jiakuan	TKO	1		Chinese traditional martial arts confrontation
Lightweight 70kg	(Russia) Artur Isayanc	def.	(China) Hao Shengbin	Decision (Unanimous)	3	3:00	
Light Featherweight 63kg	(China) Wei Rui	def.	(Austria) Sasa Jovanovic	KO (Side High Kick)	2	2:12	
Light Bantamweight 57kg	(China) Xu Luzhe	def.	(Japan) Ryota	Decision (Unanimous)	3	3:00	
Light Bantamweight 57kg	(China) Wang Junguang	def.	(Japan) Sano Tenma	Decision (Unanimous)	3	3:00	Light Bantamweight Champion Challenge Qualification
Light Lightweight 67kg	(China) Qiu Jianliang	def.	(Spain) Issam Chadid	Decision (Unanimous)	3	3:00	
MMA Women's Mini Flyweight 52kg	(China) Wang Xue	def.	(Japan) Yaiba	TKO	3	3:30	
MMA Featherweight 65kg	(China) Ji Xiang	def.	(United Kingdom) Mehmosh Raza	Submission (guillotine choke)	1		
Cold weapon combat	(China) Mo Jun (Fengtou Ge)	def.	(China) Cui Minjun (Two handed sword)	Decision	1	3:00	
MMA Light Bantamweight 57kg	(Japan) Ishitsuna Tetsuo	def.	(China) Yin Shuai	Decision (Unanimous)	3	5:00	
Youth League
Bantamweight 60kg	(China) Jia Ziteng	vs.	(China) Yang Xiaojie		3	3:00	

== Glory of Heroes 32: Huizhou ==
Glory of Heroes 32: Huizhou
- Promotion: Glory of Heroes
- Date: July 7, 2018
- Venue: Huiyang Sports Exhibition Center
- City: Guangdong, China

Event chronology
Glory of Heroes 31: Beijing	Glory of Heroes 32: Huizhou	Glory of Heroes 33: Shanghai

Glory of Heroes 32: Huizhou was a kickboxing and MMA event held on July 7, 2018 at the Huiyang Sports Exhibition Center in Guangdong, China.

=== Results ===
Main Card
Weight Class				Method	Round	Time	Notes
Light Featherweight 63kg	(China) Wei Rui	def.	(China) Deng Zeqi	KO (Knee)	2	1:58	GOH 63kg Tournament Finals
Light Lightweight 67kg	(Japan) Matsuoka Riki	def.	(China) Tie Yinghua	Decision (Unanimous)	3	3:00	
Super Fights
Light Lightweight 67kg	(Iran) Iman Alipour	def.	(China) Zhou Yi	Ext. R Decision	4	3:00	
Light Bantamweight 57kg	(China) Huo Xiaolong	def.	(Thailand) Chaiyarat	KO	2		
Lightweight 70kg	(China) Zhao Chunyang	def.	(Iran) Seyed Jalal	KO	1		
Light Lightweight 67kg	(Thailand) Patipan	def.	(China) Chen Yage	Decision (Unanimous)	3	3:00	
Women's Flyweight 56kg	(China) Yang Yang	def.	(Norway) Anne Line	Decision (Unanimous)	3	3:00	
MMA Middleweight 80kg	(China) Shun Feng	def.	(Iran) Omid Muhammad	Decision (Unanimous)	3	5:00	
MMA Bantamweight 60kg	(Russia) Bair Asalkhanov	def.	(China) He Jinhao	Decision (Unanimous)	3	5:00	
MMA Middleweight 80kg	(China) Fan Rong	def.	(Tajikistan) Soleh Hasanov	Submission (Armbar)	3		
Youth League
Light Bantamweight 57kg	(China) Wu Zhendong	vs.	(China) Chen Chaoyun		3	3:00	
Light Lightweight 67kg	(China) Guo Mengfei	vs.	(China) Luo Chao		3	3:00	
MMA Bantamweight 60kg	(China) Su Aoxiang	vs.	(China) Xie Liangyu		3	3:00	

== Glory of Heroes 31: Beijing ==
Glory of Heroes 31: Beijing
- Promotion: Glory of Heroes
- Date: May 26, 2018
- Venue: Beijing Police Academy
- City: Beijing, China

Event chronology
Glory of Heroes: New Zealand vs China	Glory of Heroes 31: Beijing	Glory of Heroes 32: Huizhou

Glory of Heroes 31: Beijing was a kickboxing and MMA event held on May 26, 2018 at the Beijing Police Academy in Beijing, China.

=== Results ===
Main Card
Weight Class				Method	Round	Time	Notes
Featherweight 65kg	(China) Qiu Jianliang	def.	(Thailand) Kaew Fairtex	Decision (Unanimous)	3	3:00	
Light Lightweight 67kg	(China) Tie Yinghua	def.	(Thailand) Singdam Kiatmuu9	KO (Spinning Hook Kick)	1	2:10	
Super Fights
Light Lightweight 67kg	(China) Liao Xin	def.	(Thailand) Tarathep	TKO (punches)	1	1:12	
Light Lightweight 67kg	(China) Han Wenbao	def.	(Greece) Kostas Fasomitakis	Decision (Unanimous)	3	3:00	
Light Bantamweight 57kg	(China) Wang Junguang	def.	(Ukraine) Yevgen Kraminskyi	Decision (Unanimous)	3	3:00	
Light Lightweight 67kg	(China) Suai Qi	def.	(Thailand) Chairit	KO (Knee)	1	0:52	
Women's Mini Flyweight 52kg	(China) Zhang Kejia	def.	(China) Yao Zhichun	Decision (Unanimous)	3	3:00	
Light Middleweight 75kg	(China) Ni Jun	def.	(Thailand) Sawettapong	Decision (Unanimous)	3	3:00	
Bantamweight 60kg	(China) Yun Qi	def.	(Japan) Masahiro Yamamoto	Decision (Unanimous)	3	3:00	
MMA Women's Flyweight 56kg	(China) Meng Bo	def.	(Netherlands) Mellony Geugjes	Decision (Unanimous)	3	5:00	
MMA Bantamweight 60kg	(China) Cui Liucai	def.	(Kazakhstan) Begnar	TKO (punches)	2		
Youth League
Light Lightweight 67kg	(China) Lin Yiming	vs.	(China) Wu Jianguo		3	3:00	
Light Middleweight 75kg	(China) Shi Shuai	vs.	(China) Han Haojie		3	3:00	
Light Middleweight 75kg	(China) Zhang Pengcheng	vs.	(China) Bu Yunlong		3	3:00	

== Glory of Heroes: New Zealand vs China ==
Glory of Heroes: New Zealand vs China
- Promotion: Glory of Heroes
- Date: March 3, 2018
- Venue: ASB Stadium
- City: Auckland, New Zealand

Event chronology
Glory of Heroes: Chengdu	Glory of Heroes: New Zealand vs China	Glory of Heroes 31: Beijing

Glory of Heroes: New Zealand vs China was a kickboxing and MMA event held on March 3, 2018 at the ASB Stadium in Auckland, New Zealand.

=== Results ===
Main Card
Weight Class				Method	Round	Time	Notes
MMA Bantamweight 60kg	(New Zealand) Kai Kara-France	def.	(China) Shi Xiaoyu	Submission (Rear Naked Choke)	1		
MMA Middleweight 80kg	(China) Fan Rong	def.	(New Zealand) Tony Angelov	TKO	1		
Middleweight 80kg	(China) Li Hui	def.	(New Zealand) Tyson Turner	Decision (Split)	3	3:00	
Featherweight 65kg	(China) Zhou Yi	def.	(New Zealand) Kodi Huffam	Decision (Unanimous)	3	3:00	
Lightweight 70kg	(China) Yan Shuaiqi	def.	(New Zealand) Yassin Tansi	TKO	3		
Women's Mini Flyweight 52kg	(New Zealand) Wendy Talbot	def.	(China) Wang Xue	Decision (Split)	3	3:00	
Bantamweight 60kg	(China) Zheng Junfeng	def.	(New Zealand) Craig Marshall Hughesb	TKO	2		
Light Lightweight 67kg	(China) Han Wenbao	def.	(New Zealand) Thomas Maguren	Decision (Unanimous)	3	3:00	
Light Bantamweight 57kg	(China) Wang Junguang	def.	(New Zealand) Dominic Reed	Decision (Unanimous)	3	3:00	
Lightweight 70kg	(New Zealand) Blood Diamond	def.	(China) Zhao Chunyang	Decision (Unanimous)	3	3:00	

== Glory of Heroes: Chengdu ==
Glory of Heroes: Chengdu
- Promotion: Glory of Heroes
- Date: February 3, 2018
- Venue: Sichuan International Tennis Center
- City: Chengdu, China

Event chronology
Glory of Heroes: Qingdao	Glory of Heroes: Chengdu	Glory of Heroes: New Zealand vs China

Glory of Heroes: Chengdu was a kickboxing event held on February 3, 2018 at the Sichuan International Tennis Center in Chengdu, China.

=== Results ===
Main Card
Weight Class				Method	Round	Time	Notes
Lightweight 70kg	(China) Liao Xin	def.	(Thailand) Sarawut	KO	2		
Light Bantamweight 57kg	(China) Huo Xiaolong	def.	(Belgium) Miri Zakaria	Decision (Unanimous)	3	3:00	
Bantamweight 60kg	(China) Yun Qi	def.	(Thailand) Sudsakhorn	KO	1	0:22	
Light Lightweight 67kg	(China) Lu Jianbo	def.	(Thailand) Teerachai	Decision (Unanimous)	3	3:00	
Light Lightweight 67kg	(China) Tie Yinghua	def.	(Canada) Gabriel Varga	Decision (Unanimous)	3	3:00	
Light Lightweight 67kg	(Russia) Abdul Malik	def.	(China) Chen Yage	Decision (Unanimous)	3	3:00	
Light Lightweight 67kg	(China) Han Wenbao	def.	(Thailand) Mingkwan	Decision (Unanimous)	3	3:00	
Youth League
Bantamweight 60kg	(China) Wu Zhendong	vs.	(China) Yang Xiaojie		3	3:00	
Bantamweight 60kg	(China) Li Wenlong	vs.	(China) Liang Hongjie		3	3:00	
Junior Heavyweight 80kg	(China) Zhang Pengcheng	vs.	(China) Qin Yudong		3	3:00	
Bantamweight 60kg	(China) Jia Ziteng	vs.	(China) Dai Shijie		3	3:00	

== Glory of Heroes: Qingdao ==
Glory of Heroes: Qingdao
- Promotion: Glory of Heroes
- Date: January 27, 2018
- Venue: China University of Petroleum Huadong Gymnasium
- City: Qingdao, China

Event chronology
Glory of Heroes: Guangzhou	Glory of Heroes: Qingdao	Glory of Heroes: Chengdu

Glory of Heroes: Qingdao was a kickboxing and MMA event held on January 27, 2018 at the China University of Petroleum Huadong Gymnasium in Qingdao, China.

=== Results ===
Main Card
Weight Class				Method	Round	Time	Notes
MMA Bantamweight 60kg	(China) Wang Shuo	def.	(Ukraine) Vitalii	Decision (Unanimous)	5	3:00	
MMA Bantamweight 60kg	(China) Shi Xiaoyu	def.	(Philippines) Joseph Omana	Decision (Unanimous)	5	3:00	
MMA Mini Flyweight 52kg	(China) Wang Xue	def.	(Brazil) Araujo Thatiane	Decision (Unanimous)	5	3:00	
Featherweight 65kg	(Russia) Abdul Malik	def.	(China) Zhou Yi	Decision (Unanimous)	3	3:00	
Light Featherweight 63kg	(China) Deng Zeqi	def.	(Ukraine) Melnyk Vladyslav	Decision (Unanimous)	3	3:00	
Lightweight 70kg	(Russia) Arslan Magomedov	def.	(China) Zhou Tao	TKO	1		
Lightweight 70kg	(China) Qiu Jianliang	def.	(Japan) Yuichiro Nagashima	TKO (punches)	3	1:23	
Youth League
Bantamweight 60kg	(China) Chen Zhen	vs.	(China) Ding Haotian		3	3:00	
Featherweight 65kg	(China) Lin Yiming	vs.	(China) Luo Chao		3	3:00	
Lightweight 70kg	(China) Shi Shuai	def.	(China) Guo Mengfei	Decision (Unanimous)	3	3:00	

== Glory of Heroes: Guangzhou ==
Glory of Heroes: Guangzhou
- Promotion: Glory of Heroes
- Date: January 13, 2018
- Venue: Guangzhou University Town Sports Cent
- City: Guangzhou, China

Event chronology
Glory of Heroes: Wudang Mountain	Glory of Heroes: Guangzhou	Glory of Heroes: Qingdao

Glory of Heroes: Guangzhou was a kickboxing and MMA event held on January 13, 2018 at the Guangzhou University Town Sports Cent in Guangzhou, China.

=== Results ===
Main Card
Weight Class				Method	Round	Time	Notes
Light Bantamweight 57kg	(Russia) Astemir Borsov	def.	(France) Hamech Hakim	Decision (Unanimous)	3	3:00	57kg Tournament Finals
Bantamweight 60kg	(China) Feng Liang	def.	(China) Zheng Junfeng	Decision (Unanimous)	3	3:00	60kg Tournament Finals
Junior Lightweight 67kg	(China) Tie Yinghua	def.	(Belgium) Mohamed Hendouf	Ext. R Decision	4	3:00	67kg Tournament Finals
Super Fights
MMA Featherweight 65kg	(Spain) Daniel Vasquez	def.	(China) Wang jizheng	Submission (rear-naked choke)	1		
MMA Featherweight 65kg	(China) Cui Liucai	def.	(United States) Giovanni Moljo	Decision (Unanimous)	3	5:00	
MMA Middleweight 80kg	(China) Fan Rong	def.	(Equatorial Guinea) Felipe Nsue	Submission (rear-naked choke)	3		
Featherweight 65kg	(China) Wei Rui	def.	(Thailand) Phosa Nopphorn	KO (punches)	1	1:00	
Youth League
Bantamweight 60kg	(China) Liang Hongjie	vs.	(China) Yang Xiaojie		3	3:00	
Featherweight 65kg	(China) Lan Bo	vs.	(China) Liu Dezheng		3	3:00	
Bantamweight 60kg	(China) Wu Zhendong	def.	(China) Dai Shijie	Decision (Unanimous)	3	3:00	
Lightweight 70kg	(China) Han Haojie	def.	(China) Jiang Menghui	Decision (Unanimous)	3	3:00	

== Glory of Heroes: Wudang Mountain ==
Glory of Heroes: Wudang Mountain
- Promotion: Glory of Heroes
- Date: January 6, 2018
- Venue: Wudang International Wushu Exchange Center
- City: Hubei, China

Event chronology
Glory of Heroes: Jinan	Glory of Heroes: Wudang Mountain	Glory of Heroes: Guangzhou

Glory of Heroes: Wudang Mountain was a kickboxing and MMA event held on January 6, 2018 at the Wudang International Wushu Exchange Center in Hubei, China.

=== Results ===
Main Card
Weight Class				Method	Round	Time	Notes
Junior Featherweight 63kg	(China) Deng Zeqi	def.	(Romania) Cristian Spetcu	Ext. R Decision	4	3:00	63kg Tournament Semi-Finals B
Junior Lightweight 67kg	(Belgium) Mohamed Hendouf	def.	(China) Han Wenbao	Decision (Unanimous)	3	3:00	67kg Tournament Semi-Finals A
Junior Lightweight 67kg	(China) Tie Yinghua	def.	(Thailand) Iquezang Kor.Rungthanakeat	TKO (Knee)	1		67kg Tournament Semi-Finals B
Super Fights
MMA Bantamweight 60kg	(China) Yang Sen	def.	(Portugal) Tiago Poirier	Submission (Rear Naked Choke)	1		
MMA Featherweight 65kg	(China) Ji Xian	def.	(Brazil) Anderson Bueno	Submission (Armbar)	1		
Junior Lightweight 67kg	(Portugal) Diego Freitas	def.	(China) Lu Jianbo	Decision (Unanimous)	3	3:00	
Youth League
Featherweight 65kg	(China) Lan Bo	vs.	(China) Chen Rui		3	3:00	
Lightweight 70kg	(China) Zhang Zhihao	vs.	(China) Wu Jianguo		3	3:00	
Junior Lightweight 67kg	(China) Zhang Yang	def.	(China) Wang Xianwei	Decision (Unanimous)	3	3:00	
Junior Heavyweight 80kg	(China) Zhang Tengsen	def.	(China) Qin Yudong	Decision (Unanimous)	3	3:00	

== See also ==
- 2018 in Glory
- 2018 in Kunlun Fight
- 2018 in K-1
- 2018 in ONE Championship
- 2018 in Romanian kickboxing
