= Changzhi Stadium =

Sports venue in Changzhi, China

Coordinates: 36°13′07″N 113°04′24″E

- Interactive map of Changzhi Stadium
- Full name: Changzhi Stadium
- Location: Changzhi, China
- Capacity: 27,000

Construction
- Opened: 2010

Changzhi Stadium is a multi-purpose stadium in Changzhi, China. It is currently used mostly for football matches. The stadium holds 27,000 spectators.
