= Carcavelos e Parede =

- Civil parish
- Location in Portugal
- Coordinates: 38.691°N 9.334°W
- Country: Portugal
- Region: Lisbon
- Metropolitan area: Lisbon
- District: Lisbon
- Municipality: Cascais

Area
  - Total: 8.11 km^{2} (3.13 sq mi)

Population (2011)
  - Total: 45,007
  - Density: 5,500/km^{2} (14,000/sq mi)
- Time zone: UTC+00:00 (WET)
  - Summer (DST): UTC+01:00 (WEST)

Carcavelos e Parede is a civil parish in the municipality of Cascais, Portugal. It was formed in 2013 by the merger of the former parishes Carcavelos and Parede. The population in 2011 was 45,007, in an area of 8.11 km^{2}.
