= Zhang Lanpei =

Chinese kickboxer

- Born: January 1, 1998 (age 28); Shaba, Yongshun County, China
- Other names: Xiangxi Tiger (湘西虎)
- Nationality: Chinese
- Height: 168 cm (5 ft 6 in)
- Weight: 63 kg (139 lb; 9.9 st)
- Style: Kickboxing, Sanda
- Stance: Orthodox
- Fighting out of: Guangzhou, China
- Team: Jiangxi Qisheng Fighting
- Trainer: Deng Zeqi

Zhang Lanpei (Chinese: 张岚沛) is a Miao, Chinese kickboxer.

As of December 2020 he was ranked #9 Bantamweight in the world by Combat Press.

== Titles and accomplishments ==
- Wu Lin Feng
  - 2020 Wu Lin Feng China -60 kg Champion

== Fight record ==
Professional Kickboxing Record
36 Wins, 13 Losses, 0 Draw, 0 No Contest
Date	Result	Opponent	Event	Location	Method	Round	Time
2024-10-26	Loss	(Georgia (country)) Giorgi Malania	Wu Lin Feng 549 - 63 kg Qualifier Tournament, Semifinals	Tangshan, China	Decision (Unanimous)	3	3:00
2024-07-23	Loss	(Japan) Hirotaka Asahisa	Wu Lin Feng 545	Xinxing, Xinjiang, China	Decision (Unanimous)	3	3:00
2024-05-14	Win	(Cambodia) Phal Sophorn	Ganzberg Kun Khmer x Wu Lin Feng 2024: Cambodia vs China	Cambodia	Decision	3	3:00
2024-01-27	Win	(Thailand) Petchdam Petchyindee Academy	Wu Lin Feng 2024: 12th Global Kung Fu Festival	Tangshan, China	Decision (Unanimous)	3	3:00
2023-06-24	Win	(Greece) Angelos Martinos	Wu Lin Feng 539	Tangshan, China	Decision (Unanimous)	3	3:00
2022-03-26	Loss	(China) Ma Yunkang	Wu Lin Feng 528	Zhengzhou, China	Decision (Unanimous)	3	3:00
Zhang Lanpei was deducted 1 point before the fight for missing weight.
2021-12-16	Win	(China) Wei Weiyang	Wu Lin Feng 526	Zhengzhou, China	Decision (Split)	3	3:00
2021-05-29	Win	(China) Zhao Chongyang	Wu Lin Feng 2021: World Contender League 4th Stage	Zhengzhou, China	TKO (Punches)	2	2:02
2021-03-27	Loss	(China) Zhao Boshi	Wu Lin Feng 2021: World Contender League 1st Stage	China	Decision (Unanimous)	3	3:00
2021-01-23	Loss	(China) Zhao Chongyang	Wu Lin Feng 2021: Global Kung Fu Festival	Macao, China	Decision (Unanimous)	3	3:00
2020-12-22	Win	(China) Yang Ming	Wu Lin Feng 2020: Women's 52kg Championship Tournament	Zhengzhou, China	Decision	3	3:00
2020-11-14	Win	(China) Zhao Chongyang	Wu Lin Feng 2020: China 60kg Championship Tournament, Final	Zhengzhou, China	KO (Punches & Knee)	1	2:05
Wins WLF China -60kg title.
2020-11-14	Win	(China) Zhao Boshi	Wu Lin Feng 2020: China 60kg Championship Tournament, Semi Final	Zhengzhou, China	KO (Low Kick)	1	
2020-11-14	Win	(China) Xue Shenzheng	Wu Lin Feng 2020: China 60kg Championship Tournament, Quarter Final	Zhengzhou, China	KO (Punches & Knee)	1	2:40
2020-08-29	Win	(China) Wang Junyu	Wu Lin Feng 2020: China New Kings Tournament Final	Zhengzhou, China	Decision	3	3:00
2020-07-05	Win	(China) Li Yuankun	Wu Lin Feng 2020: King's Super Cup 3rd Group Stage	Zhengzhou, China	Ext.R Decision	4	3:00
2020-06-13	Loss	(China) Zhang Jinhu	Wu Lin Feng 2020: King's Super Cup 2nd Group Stage	Zhengzhou, China	Decision	3	3:00
2020-05-15	Loss	(China) Zhao Boshi	Wu Lin Feng 2020: King's Super Cup 1st Group Stage	Zhengzhou, China	Decision (Unanimous)	3	3:00
2019-09-06	Loss	(Thailand) Chaophraya Petch Por.Tor.Aor	Wu Lin Feng 2019: WLF at Lumpinee - China vs Thailand	Bangkok, Thailand	Decision (Unanimous)	3	3:00
2019-05-04	Win	(Russia) Roman Minashan	Fight Time	Xinyu, China	Decision (Unanimous)	3	3:00
2019-03-24	Loss	(Greece) Olsjan Mesoutaj	Wu Lin Feng 2019: WLF x Gods of War XII - China vs Greece	Athens, Greece	Decision	3	3:00
2019-01-19	Win	(Japan) Yuki Miwa	Wu Lin Feng 2019: WLF World Cup 2018-2019 Final	Haikou, China	Decision (Unanimous)	3	3:00
2018-12-08	Win	(Thailand) Changnenlek	Wu Lin Feng 2018: WLF x S1 - China vs Thailand	Thailand	Decision	3	3:00
2018-11-07	Loss	(Brazil) Fabrício Andrade	Wu Lin Feng 2018: WLF x KF1	Hong Kong	Decision	3	3:00
2018-10-13	Win	(Canada) Liam Gallagher	Wu Lin Feng 2018: China vs Canada	Canada	Decision (Unanimous)	3	3:00
2018-08-04	Win	(France) Alexis Barateau	Wu Lin Feng 2018: WLF -67kg World Cup 2018-2019 2nd Round	Zhengzhou, China	KO (Body Kick)	1	0:30
2018-06-02	Win	(China) Zhu Rui	Wu Lin Feng New Generation	Zhong County, China	KO (Left Hook to the body)		
2016-10-14	Win	(Thailand) Chenchai	Wu Lin Feng x KF1	Hong Kong	Decision (Unanimous)	3	3:00
Legend: Win Loss Draw/No contest Notes
