= Yang Ming =

Yang Ming may refer to:

- Mat Yeung or Yang Ming (born 1981), Hong Kong television actor
- Yang Ming (kickboxer), Chinese kickboxer
- National Yang-Ming University, university in Taipei, Taiwan
- Wang Yangming, Ming dynasty neo-Confucian and bureaucrat
- Yang Ming Marine Transport Corporation, Taiwanese shipping company
- Yangmingshan, national park in Taiwan
