= Lerdsila Chumpairtour =

Muay Thai fighter and kickboxer

Lerdsila Muaythai Iyarin
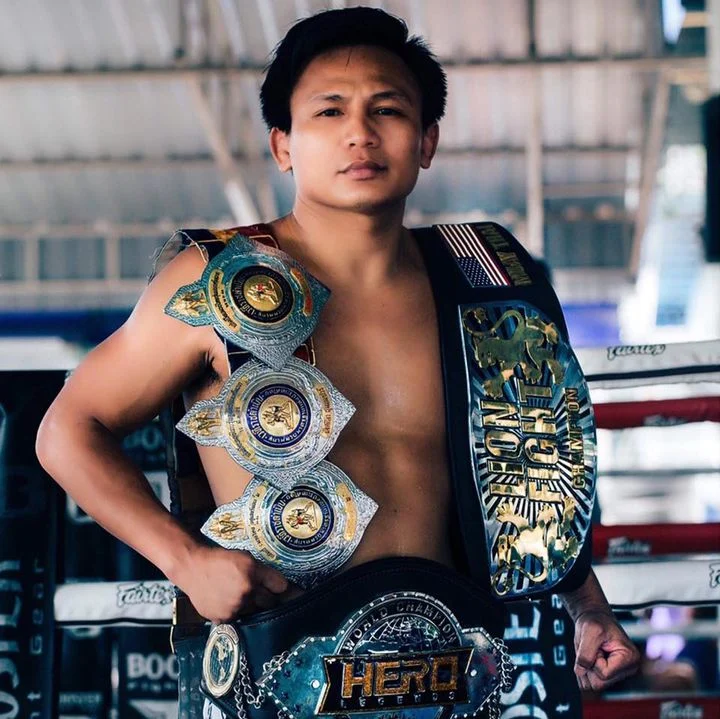
- Born: Manop Srirupi; October 22, 1981 (age 44); Kaset Sombun, Chaiyaphum, Thailand
- Native name: มานพ ศรีรูปี
- Other names: Lerdsila Phuket Top Team (เลิศศิลา ภูเก็ตท็อปทีม); Lerdsila Chumpairtour (เลิศศิลา ชุมแพทัวร์)
- Nickname: The Eel (ปลาไหล); The Eel on a Skateboard (ปลาไหลใส่สเก็ต); Mr. Lightning (มิสเตอร์ไลท์นิ่ง)
- Height: 165 cm (5 ft 5 in)
- Division: Mini Flyweight; Super Flyweight; Bantamweight; Super Bantamweight; Lightweight; Super Lightweight
- Style: Muay Thai (Muay Femur)
- Stance: Orthodox
- Team: Bangtao Muay Thai & MMA Gym; Muaythai Iyarin; Phuket Top Team; Jocky Gym; World Muay Thai Gym
- Years active: c. 1991-present

Kickboxing record
- Total: 234
- Wins: 194
- Losses: 35
- Draws: 5

Manop Srirupi (Thai: มานพ ศรีรูปี; born October 22, 1981), known professionally as Lerdsila Muaythai Iyarin (Thai: เลิศศิลา มวยไทย ไอยาริน) is a Thai Muay Thai fighter and professional kickboxer. He is a multiple-time Muay Thai world champion (WMC, WBC, WLF, WPMF, WCK) and three-division Rajadamnern Stadium champion.

== Biography ==
He first began training in Muay Thai at the age of 7 under his father's tutelage and had his first bout that same year. Lerdsila then moved to Bangkok when he was 12 years old to pursue a career in professional Muay Thai, training at Jocky Gym which created many legendary fighters such as Saenchai, Somrak Khamsing, Silapathai Jockygym, and Rolex Kaennorasing. Lerdsila has competed countless times at the famed Lumpinee and Rajadamnern Stadiums, even claiming the prestigious Rajadamnern Muay Thai World Title in three different weight classes. In 2015, Lerdsila moved to train at Phuket Top Team.

Lerdsila is of Khon Isan descent. Outside of fighting, he enjoys association football, music, and singing karaoke.

== Fighting style ==
Lerdsila developed his style through a long period of training in Jocky Gym, where fighters were trained to be fast, elusive and technical oriented. Lerdsila explained that he likes to mix Muay Thai with techniques he saw in other martial arts such as Taekwondo, Karate and Boxing. Lerdsila doesn't take fights too seriously: he doesn't care about winning or losing, but to have fun during fights by taunting, keep his opponents guessing, making them angry to break their concentration during fights. People call Lerdsila "The Eel on a skateboard" because of how evasive he is; Lerdsila is extremely good at incorporating the Teep and head movements into his defense, especially countering flashy, explosive kicks of his opponents.

“No matter who was kicking, I would always see it coming and just lean back,” - Lerdsila

But, no matter the opponent or where he fought, Lerdsila says he went out to fight and enjoy it. After 200 fights, he said it is important to enjoy what you're doing. Lerdsila says respecting your opponents is important in Thai boxing, which led to his style of fighting.

== Muay Thai career ==
=== Thailand ===
Lerdsila fought in both Rajadamnern Stadium, Lumpinee Stadium from 1999 to 2010 defeating notable opponents such as Watcharachai Kaewsamrit, Fahsuchon Sit-O, Jaroenchai Kesagym, Nongbee Kiatyongyut, and Anuwat Kaewsamrit. His biggest achievement occurred in 2004 when he defeated Pinsinchai and Won the Rajadamnern Stadium Super Bantamweight (122 lbs) title.

=== K-1 ===
In 2012 Lerdsilla defended the WCK Muaythai Lightweight (135 lbs) World title against Gabriel Varga in the event K-1 World Grand Prix 2012 Los Angeles, California, losing a 3-round decision.

=== China ===
After a loss to Deng Zeqi, Lerdsila rematched Deng Zeqi twice for the WLF Muaythai Lightweight (135 lbs) World title and won both by decision.

Lersilla would go 2 and 1 in his last 3 with a win against Wei Rui and later fought Wei Ninghui during Kunlun Fight 23. Lerdsila won a unanimous decision.

In early 2015 he picked up two wins against Wang Wanben, Wei Ninghui.

Lerdsila suffered decision loss to Deng Zeqi during the 2015 Wu Lin Feng & WCK Muaythai: China vs USA event.

After his last defeat he fought 8 times winning 7 and a draw against Liu Wei, and during his run he defeated Zheng Kai in June 2017, Tang Yao in January 2016.

Lerdsila fought Kang En during the 2017 Hero Legend event for the hero title. The fight went into an extra fourth round, where Lerdsila won a decision.

=== Lion Fight ===
In 2017 he defeated Jacob Hebeisen by left high kick knockout in the event Lion Fight 36

In 2018 he defeated Alexi Serepisos by decision in the event Lion Fight 40.

=== ONE Championship ===
On June 23, 2018, Lerdsila made his ONE Championship debut at ONE Championship: Pinnacle of Power, where he defeated Sok Thy by split decision.

On November 17, 2018, he faced Sok Thy a second time at ONE Championship: Warrior's Dream, where Lerdsila won by unanimous decision.

On April 12, 2019, Lerdsila defeated Kohei "Momotaro" Kodera by unanimous decision at ONE Championship: Roots of Honor.

On August 16, 2019, he faced Michael Savvas at ONE Championship: Dreams of Gold. Savvas lost by TKO when he was thrown and landed at an awkward angle on his elbow.

In the last ONE event of 2019, Lerdsila faced Elias Mahmoudi at ONE Championship: Mark Of Greatness on December 9, 2019. He would lose by unanimous decision, marking his first loss in ONE Championship.

=== Last Fight ===
Lerdsila fought Huang Shuailu in the event Wu Lin Feng 2021: World Contender League 7th Stage, losing by decision.

=== Post career ===
Lerdsila has said he never intends to fully leave the sport of Muay Thai said after his pro fighting career is finished, he intends to open his own gym to train the next generation of fighters.

=== Comeback ===
On September 21, 2024, Lerdsila Chumpairtour defeated Algerian fighter Sohanne Bengana by technical knockout (TKO) at the Golden Era Muay Thai Championships, capturing the ISKA Intercontinental Super-lightweight title.

On November 14, 2024, Lerdsila faced Azerbaijani fighter Turach Novurov at Karate Combat and won the bout by unanimous decision after three 3-minute rounds.

== Titles and accomplishments ==
Muay Thai

- Rajadamnern Stadium
  - 1999 Rajadamnern Stadium Super Flyweight (115 lbs) Champion
    - Two successful title defenses
  - 2002 Rajadamnern Stadium Bantamweight (118 lbs) Champion
    - One successful title defense
  - 2004 Rajadamnern Stadium Super Bantamweight (122 lbs) Champion
- WCK Muaythai
  - 2011 WCK Muaythai Lightweight (135 lbs) World Champion
- Wu Lin Feng (WLF)
  - 2013 WLF Muaythai Lightweight (135 lbs) World Champion
    - One successful title defense
- Lion Fight
  - 2017 Lion Fight Lightweight (135 lbs) World Champion
- Hero Legends
  - 2017 Hero Legends Bantamweight World Champion
- Suk Muay Femur
  - 2021 Suk Muay Femur Super Lightweight (140 lbs) Champion
- International Sport Karate Association (ISKA)
  - 2024 ISKA Intercontinental Super-lightweight (63.5 kg) Champion
- World Muaythai Council (WMC)
  - WMC Lightweight (135 lbs) World Champion (three times)
- World Professional Muaythai Federation (WPMF)
  - WPMF Lightweight (135 lbs) World Champion
- World Games
  - 2013 World Games -63.5 kg (silver)

== Muay Thai and Kickboxing record ==
Professional Muaythai and kickboxing record
194 wins, 35 losses, 5 draws
Date	Result	Opponent	Event	Location	Method	Round	Time
2025-09-06	Win	(United States) Jason Somchay	Stand Up Fight Series	St. Charles, United States	Decision (unanimous)	3	3:00
2025-08-23	Win	(Thailand) Neungsiam Samphusri	Infinity Fight Night	Southfield, United States	TKO	2	1:21
2024-09-21	Win	(Algeria) Sohanne Bengana	Golden Era Muay Thai Championship 7: Resurrection	New York, United States	TKO	1	2:19
Wins the ISKA Intercontinental Super-lightweight (63.5kg) title.
2021-11-27	Loss	(China) Huang Shuailu	Wu Lin Feng 2021: World Contender League 7th Stage	Zhengzhou, China	Ext.R decision	4	3:00
2021-07-11	Win	(Australia) Tyson Harrison	Suk Muay Femur	Pattaya, Thailand	Decision	5	3:00
Wins the Suk Muay Femur 63.5kg title.
2019-12-09	Loss	(Algeria) Elias Mahmoudi	ONE Championship: Mark Of Greatness	Kuala Lumpur, Malaysia	Decision (unanimous)	3	3:00
2019-08-16	Win	(Cyprus) Savvas Michael	ONE Championship: Dreams of Gold	Bangkok, Thailand	TKO (arm injury/thrown)	2	0:40
2019-04-12	Win	(Japan) Momotaro	ONE Championship: Roots of Honor	Manila, Philippines	Decision (unanimous)	3	3:00
2018-11-17	Win	(Cambodia) Sok Thy	ONE Championship: Warrior's Dream	Jakarta, Indonesia	Decision (unanimous)	3	3:00
2018-06-23	Win	(Cambodia) Sok Thy	ONE Championship: Pinnacle of Power	Beijing, China	Decision (split)	3	3:00
2018-02-03	Win	(New Zealand) Alexi Serepisos	Lion Fight 40	United States	Decision (unanimous)	5	3:00
2017-12-31	Win	(China) Kang En	Hero Legend 2017	China	Ext.R decision	4	3:00
Wins the Hero Legends World title.
2017-09-09	Win	(China) Chen Wanhai	Hero Legend 2017	Tai'an, China	TKO	2	
2017-06-25	Win	(China) Zheng Kai	Hero Legends	China	Decision (unanimous)	3	3:00
2017-04-28	Win	(United States) Jacob Hebeisen	Lion Fight 36	United States	KO (left high kick)	2	
2016-10-02	Draw	(China) Liu Wei	Hero Legends	China	Decision draw	3	3:00
2016-09-11	Win	(China) Liu Lianfeng	Hero Legends	China	Decision (unanimous)	3	3:00
2016-07-09	Win	(China) Cui Jianhui	Hero Legends	China	Decision (unanimous)	3	3:00
2016-01-16	Win	(China) Tang Yao	Hero Legends	China	Decision (unanimous)	3	3:00
2015-12-13	Win	(Italy) Garraffo	WBK 9	China	Decision (unanimous)	3	3:00
2015-11-13	Loss	(China) Deng Zeqi	Wu Lin Feng & WCK Muaythai: China vs USA	Las Vegas, USA	Decision	3	3:00
2015-04-26	Win	(China) Wei Ninghui	Kunlun Fight 23	Changsha, China	Decision (unanimous)	3	3:00
2015-01-03	Win	(China) Wang Wanben	Kunlun Fight 15 & 16	Nanjing, China	Decision (unanimous)	3	3:00
2014-11-16	Loss	(China) Li Ning	Kunlun Fight 13	Hohhot, China	Decision (unanimous)	3	3:00
2014-02-16	Win	(China) Wei Rui	Kunlun Fight 2	Zhengzhou, China	Decision (unanimous)	3	3:00
2014-01-25	Win	(China) Deng Zeqi	Kunlun Fight 1	Pattaya, Thailand	Decision (unanimous)	3	3:00
Defends WLF Muaythai Lightweight (135 lbs) World title.
2013-11-02	Win	(China) Deng Zeqi	WCK Muay Thai vs. Wulinfeng 2013	Las Vegas, Nevada	Decision (unanimous)	5	3:00
Won WLF Muaythai Lightweight (135 lbs) World title.
2012-11-14	Loss	(China) Deng Zeqi	WCK Muay Thai "Wulinfeng Spectacular"	Las Vegas, Nevada	Decision (split)	5	3:00
2012-09-08	Loss	(Canada) Gabriel Varga	K-1 World Grand Prix 2012 in Los Angeles	Los Angeles, California	Decision (unanimous)	3	3:00
Loses WCK Muaythai Lightweight (135 lbs) World title.
2010-02-16	Loss	(Thailand) F-16 Rachanon	Por.Pramook, Lumpinee Stadium	Bangkok, Thailand	Decision	5	3:00
2009-12-19	Loss	(Thailand) Singdam Kiatmoo9	Muaythai Lumpinee Krikkrai Fights	Bangkok, Thailand	Decision	5	3:00
2009-11-14	Loss	(Thailand) Orono Wor Petchpun	Muaythai Lumpinee Krikkrai Fights	Bangkok, Thailand	Decision	5	3:00
2009-10-10	Loss	(Thailand) Tuantong Phumpanmoung	Muaythai Lumpinee Krikkrai Fights	Bangkok, Thailand	TKO	5	
2009-08-15	Win	(Thailand) Pansak Look Bor Kor	Muaythai Lumpinee Krikkrai Fights	Bangkok, Thailand	Decision	5	3:00
2009-07-25	Loss	(Thailand) Panpet Chor.Na Pattalung	Muaythai Lumpinee Krikkrai Fight	Bangkok, Thailand	Decision	5	3:00
2009-06-19	Win	(Thailand) Pettaksin Sor.Thumpet	Petchpiya, Lumpinee Stadium	Bangkok, Thailand	Decision	5	3:00
2009-03-20	Loss	(Thailand) Nong-O Sit Or	Petchyindee, Lumpinee Stadium	Bangkok, Thailand	Decision	5	3:00
2009-02-17	Win	(Thailand) Yodbuangam Lukbanyai	Paianun, Lumpinee Stadium	Bangkok, Thailand	Decision	5	3:00
2009-01-17	Win	(Thailand) Pueangnoi Petsupapan	Muaythai Lumpinee Krikkrai Fights	Bangkok, Thailand	Decision	5	3:00
2008-12-27	Loss	(Thailand) Yodbuangam Lukbanyai	Muaythai Lumpinee Krikkrai Fights	Bangkok, Thailand	Decision	5	3:00
2008-11-01	Loss	(Thailand) Kaew Fairtex	Muaythai on Channel 5	Thailand	Decision	5	3:00
2008-09-26	Loss	(Thailand) Kaew Fairtex	Wanboonya, Lumpinee Stadium	Bangkok, Thailand	Decision	5	3:00
2008-06-02	Win	(Thailand) Thongsuk Sor Damrongrit	Daorungchujarern, Rajadamnern Stadium	Bangkok, Thailand	Decision	5	3:00
2008-05-01	Win	(Thailand) Thongsuk Sor Damrongrit	Daorungchujarern, Rajadamnern Stadium	Bangkok, Thailand	Decision	5	3:00
2008-03-31	Loss	(Thailand) Iquezang Kor.Rungthanakeat	Daorungchujarern, Rajadamnern Stadium	Bangkok, Thailand	Decision	5	3:00
2007-12-20	Win	(Thailand) Anuwat Kaewsamrit	Daorungchujarern, Rajadamnern Stadium	Bangkok, Thailand	Decision	5	3:00
2007-11-29	Loss	(Thailand) Sarawut Lookbarnyai	Kai Yang Har Dao Tournament, Quarterfinals	Thailand	Decision	3	3:00
2007-06-21	Loss	(Thailand) Jomthong Chuwattana	Rajadamnern Stadium	Bangkok, Thailand	Decision	5	3:00
2007-05-03	Win	(Thailand) Jaroenchai Kesagym	Daowrungchujarern, Rajadamnern Stadium	Bangkok, Thailand	Decision	5	3:00
2007-02-14	Win	(Thailand) Nongbee Kiatyongyut	Sor.Sommai, Rajadamnern Stadium	Bangkok, Thailand	Decision	5	3:00
2006-12-21	Loss	(Thailand) Orono Tawan	Daowrungchujarern + Jarumueng, Rajadamnern Stadium	Bangkok, Thailand	Decision	5	3:00
2006-11-16	Win	(Thailand) Phetek Kiatyongyut	Daowrungchujarern + Jarumueng, Rajadamnern Stadium	Bangkok, Thailand	TKO	4	
2006-10-05	Loss	(Thailand) Jomthong Chuwattana	Daorungchujaroen, Rajadamnern Stadium	Bangkok, Thailand	Decision	5	3:00
2006-08-23	Win	(Thailand) Jaroenchai Kesagym	Jarumueang, Rajadamnern Stadium	Bangkok, Thailand	Decision	5	3:00
2006-07-06	Win	(Thailand) Phetto Sitjaopor	Daorungchujaroen, Rajadamnern Stadium	Bangkok, Thailand	Decision	5	3:00
2006-05-18	Draw	(Thailand) Jomthong Chuwattana	Daorungchujarean, Rajadamnern Stadium	Bangkok, Thailand	Decision draw	5	3:00
2006-04-05	Win	(Thailand) Duwao Kongudom	Jarumuang, Rajadamnern Stadium	Bangkok, Thailand	Decision	5	3:00
2006-02-15	Win	(Thailand) Sayannoi Kiatprapat	Jarumuang, Rajadamnern Stadium	Bangkok, Thailand	Decision	5	3:00
2005-12-19	Loss	(Thailand) Jomthong Chuwattana	Daorungchujarean, Rajadamnern Stadium	Bangkok, Thailand	Decision	5	3:00
2005-11-17	Loss	(Thailand) Singtongnoi Por.Telakun	Daorungchujarean, Rajadamnern Stadium	Bangkok, Thailand	Decision	5	3:00
2005-10-24	Win	(Thailand) Seanchuanglak Jirakriangkri	Daorungchujarean, Rajadamnern Stadium	Bangkok, Thailand	Decision	5	3:00
2005-09-19	Win	(Japan) Jo Zujiya	Daorungchujarean, Rajadamnern Stadium	Bangkok, Thailand	TKO	2	
2005-08-04	Win	(Thailand) Teelak N.Sipuang	Daorungchujarean, Rajadamnern Stadium	Bangkok, Thailand	TKO	4	
2005-06-03	Win	(Thailand) Deatsak S.Thumphet	Seangmaurakot, Rajadamnern Stadium	Bangkok, Thailand	Decision	5	3:00
2005-05-12	Loss	(Thailand) Deatsak S.Thumphet	Daorungchujarean, Rajadamnern Stadium	Bangkok, Thailand	Decision	5	3:00
2005-03-24	Win	(Thailand) Dendanai Kiatsakkongka	Daorungchujarean, Rajadamnern Stadium	Bangkok, Thailand	Decision	5	3:00
2005-01-26	Loss	(Thailand) Anuwat Kaewsamrit	Daorungchujarean, Rajadamnern Stadium	Bangkok, Thailand	TKO	4	
2004-12-23	Win	(Thailand) Watcharachai Kaewsamrit	Rajadamnern Stadium	Bangkok, Thailand	Decision	5	3:00
2004-11-04	Loss	(Thailand) Nopparat Keatkhamtorn	Daorungchujarean, Rajadamnern Stadium	Bangkok, Thailand	Decision	5	3:00
2004-09-01	Win	(Thailand) Extra Sor.Rekchai	Jarumueang, Rajadamnern Stadium	Bangkok, Thailand	Decision	5	3:00
2004-07-29	Loss	(Thailand) Seanchernglak Jirakrengkri	Jarumueang, Rajadamnern Stadium	Bangkok, Thailand	Decision	5	3:00
2004-06-17	Win	Thailand Pinsinchai	Daorungchujarean, Rajadamnern Stadium	Bangkok, Thailand	Decision	5	3:00
Wins the Rajadamnern Stadium Super Bantamweight (122 lbs) title.
2004-04-01	Loss	(Thailand) Watcharachai Kaewsamrit	Daorungchujarean, Rajadamnern Stadium	Bangkok, Thailand	TKO	3	
2003-12-18	Loss	(Thailand) Kongpipop Petchyindee	Rajadamnern Stadium	Bangkok, Thailand	Decision	5	3:00
2003-11-24	Win	(Thailand) Watcharachai Kaewsamrit	Rajadamnern Stadium	Bangkok, Thailand	Decision	5	3:00
2003-10-09	Win	(Thailand) Seanchai Jirakreangkri	Rajadamnern Stadium	Bangkok, Thailand	Decision	5	3:00
2003-08-14	Loss	(Thailand) Saenchernnglek Jirakriengkrai	Lumpinee Stadium	Bangkok, Thailand	TKO (doctor stoppage)	3	
2003-07-17	Win	(Thailand) Fahsuchon Sit-O	Lumpinee Stadium	Bangkok, Thailand	Decision	5	3:00
2003-	Win	(Thailand) Watcharachai Kaewsamrit	Rajadamnern Stadium	Bangkok, Thailand	Decision	5	3:00
2003-	Win	(Thailand) Chaomailek Sor.Thantawan	Rajadamnern Stadium	Bangkok, Thailand	Decision	5	3:00
2003-03-31	Win	Thailand Pinsinchai	Daorungchujarean, Rajadamnern Stadium	Bangkok, Thailand	Decision	5	3:00
2003-02-05	Win	(Thailand) Chutin Por.Tawachai	Rajadamnern Stadium	Bangkok, Thailand	Decision	5	3:00
2003-01-	Win	(Thailand) Saenchernglek Jirakriengkrai		Chiang Mai, Thailand	Decision	5	3:00
2002-08-18	Win	(Thailand) Sakniran Sakthewan	Rajadamnern Stadium	Bangkok, Thailand	Decision	5	3:00
Defends the Rajadamnern Stadium Bantamweight (118 lbs) title.
2002-	Win	(Thailand) Norasing Kiatprasarnchai	Rajadamnern Stadium	Bangkok, Thailand	Decision	5	3:00
Wins the Rajadamnern Stadium Bantamweight (118 lbs) title.
2001-12-26	Win	(Thailand) Namphet Sit O	Rajadamnern Stadium	Bangkok, Thailand	Decision	5	3:00
2000-07-05	Loss	(Thailand) Norasing Kiatprasarnchai	Rajadamnern Stadium	Bangkok, Thailand	KO	3	
2000-01-04	Loss	(Thailand) Laemsing Por.Nitiwat	Rajadamnern Stadium	Bangkok, Thailand	Decision	5	3:00
1999-11-29	Win	(Thailand) Seanchoenglek Jirakriangkrai	Rajadamnern Stadium	Bangkok, Thailand	Decision	5	3:00
Defends the Rajadamnern Stadium Super Flyweight (115 lbs) title.
1999-10-25	Win	(Thailand) Laemsing Por.Nitiwat	Rajadamnern Stadium	Bangkok, Thailand	Decision	5	3:00
1999-06-19	Loss	(Thailand) Chanrit Sit-O	Rajadamnern Stadium	Bangkok, Thailand	Decision	5	3:00
1999-05-19	Win	(Thailand) Peesadaeng Kor.Kumanont	Rajadamnern Stadium	Bangkok, Thailand	Decision	5	3:00
Defends the Rajadamnern Stadium Super Flyweight (115 lbs) title.
1999-	Win	(Thailand) Peesadaeng Kor.Kumanont	Rajadamnern Stadium	Bangkok, Thailand	Decision	5	3:00
Wins the Rajadamnern Stadium Super Flyweight (115 lbs) title.
1999-03-30	Loss	(Thailand) Sanghiran Lukbanyai	Lumpinee Stadium	Bangkok, Thailand	Decision	5	3:00
1998-12-23	Win	(Thailand) Watcharachai Kaewsamrit		Bangkok, Thailand	Decision	5	3:00
1998-12-07	Win	(Thailand) Lanna Por.Phisut		Bangkok, Thailand	Decision	5	3:00
1998-10-29	Loss	(Thailand) Chaomailek Sor.Thantawan		Bangkok, Thailand	Decision	5	3:00
1997-	Draw	(Thailand) Kanthipong Luktapfah	Rajadamnern Stadium	Bangkok, Thailand	Decision	5	3:00
1997-	Win	(Thailand) Kanthipong Luktapfah	Rajadamnern Stadium	Bangkok, Thailand	Decision	5	3:00
1997-10-09	Win	(Thailand) Saenchernglek Jirakriangkrai	Rajadamnern Stadium	Bangkok, Thailand	Decision	5	3:00
1997-	Loss	(Thailand) Manja Kiattinapachai	Rajadamnern Stadium	Bangkok, Thailand	Decision	5	3:00
1997-	Win	(Thailand) Luktong Sor.Pleondo	Rajadamnern Stadium	Bangkok, Thailand	Decision	5	3:00
1997-	Win	(Thailand) Decha M-16		Bangkok, Thailand	Decision	5	3:00
Legend: Win Loss Draw/no contest Notes

Amateur Muay Thai record
Date	Result	Opponent	Event	Location	Method	Round	Time
2013-10-23	Loss	(Ukraine) Igor Liubchenko	2013 World Combat Games, Final	Bangkok, Thailand	Decision		
Wins 2013 World Combat Games Muay Thai -63.5kg Silver Medal.
2013-10-21	Win	(France) Sofiane Bougossa	2013 World Combat Games	Bangkok, Thailand	Decision		
Legend: Win Loss Draw/no contest Notes

== Karate combat record ==
Res.	Record	Opponent	Method	Event	Date	Round	Time	Location	Notes
Win	1—0	Turach Novurov	Decision (unanimous)	Karate Combat: Kickback 3	November 14, 2024	3	3:00	Bangkok, Thailand	

== See also ==
- List of male kickboxers
