= Yang Ming (kickboxer) =

Chinese kickboxer

- Born: February 20, 1995 (age 31); Zhengzhou, China
- Other names: "Golden Armored God of War" (金甲战神)
- Height: 170 cm (5 ft 7 in)
- Weight: 60 kg (130 lb; 9.4 st)
- Style: Kickboxing, Muay Thai
- Stance: Southpaw
- Fighting out of: China
- Team: Guangdong Jinjia Fighting Club

Kickboxing record
- Total: 77
- Wins: 58
- By knockout: 11
- Losses: 19

Yang Ming (Chinese: 杨明) is a Chinese kickboxer. As of October 2022, he is ranked as the tenth(10th) best super bantamweight kickboxer in the world by Beyond Kickboxing.

== Kickboxing career ==
Yang faced the 2015 K-1 Super Bantamweight champion Takeru Segawa at Rizin World Grand Prix 2015: Part 2 - Iza on December 31, 2015. Takeru won the fight by a second-round knockout, dropping Yang with a right cross in the last seconds of the round.

Yang faced Vladimir Litkyn at Wu Lin Feng 2020: WLF World Championship in Baise on January 18, 2020. He won the fight by a second-round technical knockout. Yang would go on to win his next seven bout was well, most notably beating Zhao Jianfeng at Wu Lin Feng 2020: China New Kings Tournament Final on August 29, to capture the Wu Lin Feng China and IPCC China -60 kg titles, before he was booked to face Zhang Lanpei in his ninth and final fight of the year. His winning streak was snapped, as Lanpei won the bout by decision.

Yang participated in the 2022 Wu Ling Feng -60 kg tournament, the finals of which was held at Wu Lin Feng 528 on March 26, 2022. Although Yang won the semifinal bout against Zhao Boshi, he lost a decision in turn to Huang Shuailu in the finals. Yang previously beat Shuailu in the finals of the Contender League on January 1, 2022, but was unable to replicate that performance in their rubber match.

Yang faced Pinpetch Banchamek at Wu Lin Feng 533: China vs Thailand on February 3, 2023. He won the fight by a closely contested decision.

Yang challenged the WLF super featherweight (-60 kg) champion Hirotaka Asahisa at Wu Lin Feng 537 on May 2, 2023. He lost the fight by unanimous decision.

Yang faced the former Krush Featherweight champion Takahito Niimi at Wu Lin Feng 2023 Year-End Kung Fu Festival on December 30, 2023. He won the fight by unanimous decision.

== Titles and accomplishments ==
=== Professional ===
- Wu Lin Feng
  - 2020 Wu Lin Feng China -60 kg Champion
- International Professional Combat Council
  - 2020 IPCC China -60 kg Champion
- Chinese Muay Thai Professional League
  - 2019 China Muay Thai Professional League -60 kg Champion
- Bangla Boxing Stadium
  - 2016 Bangla Stadium Champion
- World Boxing Council Muaythai
  - 2015 WBC Muay Thai 135 lbs Intercontinental Champion

=== Amateur ===
- 2014 China Muay Thai Championship -57 kg runner-up
- 2015 China Kickboxing Championship -60 kg runner-up
- 2015 China Muay Thai Championship -57 kg runner-up
- 2016 China Muay Thai Championship -57 kg champion
- 2016 East Asia Muay Thai Championship -57 kg runner-up
- 2017 China Muay Thai Championship -60 kg runner-up
- 2018 China Muay Thai Championship -60 kg Champion
- 2019 China Kickboxing Championship -60 kg runner-up

== Fight record ==
Kickboxing and Muay Thai record
59 Wins (12 (T)KOs), 19 Losses
Date	Result	Opponent	Event	Location	Method	Round	Time
2025-01-19	Loss	(France) Fabio Loisi	EM Legend 47, Tournament Semifinals	Pengzhou, China	Decision (Unanimous)	3	3:00
2024-12-21	Win	(Japan) Kanta Motoyama	Wu Lin Feng 551	Tangshan, China	TKO (3 Knockdowns)	1	
2024-09-28	Win	(Thailand) Paesaisi	Wu Lin Feng 548	Tangshan, China	Decision	3	3:00
2024-04-06	Win	(China) Zhang Haiyang	China Kickboxing Premier League	China	Decision	3	3:00
2024-03-09	Win	(China) Zheng Zhixiang	China Kickboxing Premier League	Wuzhishan City, China	Decision (Unanimous)	3	3:00
2023-12-30	Win	(Japan) Takahito Niimi	Wu Lin Feng 2023 Year-End Kung Fu Festival	Zhengzhou, China	Decision (Unanimous)	3	3:00
2023-12-23	Win	(Japan) Towa Yamaguchi	Kunlun	China	Decision (Unanimous)	3	3:00
2023-10-22	Win	(Iran) Ali Zarinfar	EM Legend 44, Intercontinental Tournament Final	Chongqing, China	Decision	3	3:00
Wins the EM Legend Intercontinental 61.5kg Title.
2023-10-22	Win	(Russia) Khavazh Oligov	EM Legend 44, Intercontinental Tournament Semifinals	Chongqing, China	Decision (Unanimous)	3	3:00
2023-05-02	Loss	(Japan) Hirotaka Asahisa	Wu Lin Feng 537	Tangshan, China	Decision (Unanimous)	5	3:00
For the Wu Lin Feng -60 kg World title .
2023-02-03	Win	(Thailand) Pinpetch Banchamek	Wu Lin Feng 533: China vs Thailand	Zhengzhou, China	Decision	3	3:00
2022-12-09	Loss	(China) Huang Shuailu	Wu Lin Feng 532, Semi Final	Zhengzhou, China	Decision	3	3:00
2022-09-24	Win	(China) Pan Jing	Wu Lin Feng 531	Zhengzhou, China	Decision	3	3:00
2022-03-26	Loss	(China) Huang Shuailu	Wu Lin Feng 528, Final	Zhengzhou, China	Decision (Split)	3	3:00
2022-03-26	Win	(China) Zhao Boshi	Wu Lin Feng 528, Semifinals	Zhengzhou, China	Decision (Unanimous)	3	3:00
2022-01-01	Win	(China) Huang Shuailu	Wu Lin Feng 2022 - World Contender League, Final	Tangshan, China	Decision	3	3:00
Wu Lin Feng -60 kg World title eliminator.
2021-09-25	Win	(China) Xue Shenzhen	Wu Lin Feng 2021: WLF in Tangshan World Contender League, Semifinal	Tangshan, China	Decision (Unanimous)	3	3:00
2021-05-29	Loss	(China) Huang Shuailu	Wu Lin Feng 2021: World Contender League 4th Stage	China	Decision (Unanimous)	3	3:00
2021-03-27	Win	(China) Li Yuankun	Wu Lin Feng 2021: World Contender League 1st Stage	China	Decision (Split)	3	3:00
2020-12-22	Loss	(China) Zhang Lanpei	Wu Lin Feng 2020: Women's 52kg Championship Tournament	Zhengzhou, China	Decision	3	3:00
2020-11-28	Win	(China) Wang Junyu	Wu Lin Feng 2020: China 70kg Championship Tournament	Zhengzhou, China	Decision (Unanimous)	3	3:00
2020-10-16	Win	(China) Wei Weiyang	Wu Lin Feng 2020: China New Kings Champions Challenge match	Hangzhou, China	Decision	3	3:00
2020-08-29	Win	(China) Zhao Jianfeng	Wu Lin Feng 2020: China New Kings Tournament Final	Zhengzhou, China	Decision	3	3:00
Wins Wu Lin Feng China and IPCC China -60kg titles.
2020-08-03	Win	(China) Jin Hu	Wu Lin Feng 2020: King's Super Cup 4th Group Stage	Zhengzhou, China	Decision	3	3:00
2020-07-05	Win	(China) Xue Shenzen	Wu Lin Feng 2020: King's Super Cup 3rd Group Stage	Zhengzhou, China	Decision	3	3:00
2020-06-13	Win	(China) Zhao Jiangfeng	Wu Lin Feng 2020: King's Super Cup 2nd Group Stage	Zhengzhou, China	Decision	3	3:00
2020-05-15	Win	(China) Zhao Zhanshi	Wu Lin Feng 2020: King's Super Cup 1st Group Stage	Zhengzhou, China	Decision (Unanimous)	3	3:00
2020-01-18	Win	(Russia) Vladimir Litkyn	Wu Lin Feng 2020: WLF World Championship in Baise	Baise, China	TKO (Punches)	2	2:00
2019-12-14	Loss	(Canada) James Georgiou	Wu Lin Feng 2019: East vs West Series - China vs Canada	Markham, Ontario, Canada	Decision	3	3:00
2019-10-26	Loss	(China) Feng Tianhao	Faith Fighting Championships 31	Xi'an, China	Decision	3	3:00
2019-09-06	Win	(Iran) Taher Nadei	Wu Lin Feng 2019: WLF at Lumpinee - China vs Thailand	Bangkok, Thailand	TKO	2	
2019-08-11	Win	(China) Dong Jian	Faith Fight	China	Decision	3	3:00
2019-06-16	Loss	(Thailand) Kongphonlek	Dream Hero	China	Decision	3	3:00
2019-01-20	Win	(China) Fan Yuelong	WKFC China Muay Thai Professional League	China	Decision	3	3:00
2018-12-08	Loss	(Thailand) Choodcho Tor.Laksong	Wu Lin Feng 2018: WLF x S1 - China vs Thailand	Thailand	Decision	3	3:00
2018-09-01	Loss	(Iran) Javad Heidari	Wu Lin Feng 2018: WLF -67kg World Cup 2018-2019 3rd Round	Zhengzhou, China	Decision	3	3:00
2018-06-16	Win	(China) Dong Jian	WKFC China Muay Thai Professional League	China	TKO (Doctor Stoppage)	3	
2018-06-02	Win	(China) Yao Hefei	Wu Lin Feng New Generation	Zhong County, China	Decision	3	3:00
2017-07-09	Loss	(Thailand) Rodtang Jitmuangnon	Topking World Series - EM Legend 21	China	KO (Body punches)	2	
2015-12-31	Loss	(Japan) Takeru	Rizin World Grand Prix 2015: Part 2 - Iza	Saitama, Japan	KO (Right Cross)	2	2:59
2015-11-28	Win		Kung Fu Fighting Ultimate Legend	Tianjin, China			
2015-10-06	Win	(Philippines) Tata	Bullet Fight Club International Championship	Xianghe County, China	TKO	3	
Wins WBC Muay Thai Intercontinental -135 lbs title.
2015-06-11	Loss	(China) Ji Wenhao	Final Legend	Macao	Decision	3	3:00
2015-05-08	Win	(Thailand) Suosongchai	Hero Legends - China vs Thailand Tournament, Final	China	Decision (Unanimous)	3	3:00
2015-05-08	Win	(Thailand) Wisa Sodiplas	Hero Legends - China vs Thailand Tournament, Semi Final	China	TKO	1	
Legend: Win Loss Draw/No contest Notes

Amateur Kickboxing record
Date	Result	Opponent	Event	Location	Method	Round	Time
2017-05-05	Loss	(Russia) Stanislav Gazitov	2017 IFMA World Championship, Round of 16	Minsk, Belarus	Decision		
Legend: Win Loss Draw/No contest Notes
