= Huang Shuailu =

Chinese kickboxer

- Born: August 21, 1999 (age 27); Sichuan, China
- Other names: "The Silent God of War" (沉默战神)
- Height: 174 cm (5 ft 9 in)
- Weight: 60 kg (130 lb; 9.4 st)
- Style: Kickboxing
- Stance: Orthodox
- Fighting out of: Chengdu, China
- Team: White Shark Fight Club
- Trainer: Gu Hui

Kickboxing record
- Total: 50
- Wins: 40
- By knockout: 14
- Losses: 10
- By knockout: 0

Huang Shuailu (Chinese: 黄帅禄) is a Chinese kickboxer.

As of April 2022 he was the #8 ranked Bantamweight kickboxer in the world by Combat Press.

== Kickboxing career ==
On July 27, 2018 Huang faced Cao Zuoyan at a Faith Fight Championship event. He lost the fight by decision.

On May 19, 2019 Huang faced Zhang Yu at a Kunlun Combat Professional League event. He won the fight by knockout in the third round with a low kick.

On June 21, 2019 Huang faced Xie Wenjie in the Kunlun Combat Professional League. He won the fight by knockout in the second round.

On December 16, 2019 Huang faced Zhao Boshi at ONE Hero Series December in a bout contested with MMA gloves. He lost the fight by unanimous decision.

On September 8, 2020 Huang faced Kaijie at Kunlun Combat Professional League. He won the fight by unanimous decision.

Huang was scheduled to face Cao Zhiyang on December 27, 2020 in a bare knuckle kickboxing fight at the Huya Kung Fu Carnival 3 event. He won the fight by second round technical knockout.

On November 27, 2021 Huang faced Lerdsila Chumpairtour at Wu Lin Feng 2021: World Contender League 7th Stage. The fight went to a draw, an extra round was contested which he won by decision. Lerdsila's team appealed the result considering that their fighter should have won after the initial 3 rounds.

On January 1, 2022 Huang was scheduled for a rematch with Yang Ming at Wu Lin Feng 527 in a fight serving as the world contender league final to earn a title shot at the Wu Lin Feng World 60 kg title. He lost the fight by unanimous decision.

Huang entered a 4-man tournament on March 26, 2022 at Wu Lin Feng 528. In semi final he defeated Zhao Chongyang by split decision. In the final he faced Yang Ming for the third time in a year and defeated him by split decision.

== Karate Combat record ==
Res.	Record	Opponent	Method	Event	Date	Round	Time	Location	Notes
Loss	0-1	Ali Zarinfar	TKO (ground and pound)	Karate Combat 45	April 20, 2024	1	1:11	Dubai, United Arab Emirates	

== Muay Thai and Kickboxing record ==
Kickboxing record
42 Wins (15 (T)KOs), 10 Losses
Date	Result	Opponent	Event	Location	Method	Round	Time
2026-11-21		(Italy) Nicola Sanzio	Red Fist Strike	Baise, China			
2026-02-06	Win	(Uzbekistan) Abdukarim Anvarov	Red Fist Strike	Baise, China	KO (Punches)	2	1:15
2025-11-04	Win	(Cambodia) Koramak Chanreach	JCK Fight Night 109	Phnom Penh, Cambodia	Decision	3	3:00
2025-05-31	Win	(Netherlands) Matthew Daalman	K-1 Beyond - Super Featherweight Championship Tournament, Quarterfinals	Yokohama, Japan	Ext.R Decision (Unanimous)	4	3:00
Huang had to withdraw from the tournament due to a jaw injury.
2025-04-05	Loss	(Portugal) Keven Gonçalves	Rajadamnern World Series	Bangkok, Thailand	Decision (Unanimous)	3	3:00
2024-12-21	Loss	(Thailand) Wutthikrai Wor.Jakrawut	Rajadamnern World Series, Rajadamnern Stadium 80th Anniversary	Bangkok, Thailand	Decision (Unanimous)	3	3:00
2024-11-16	Win	(Italy) Samuel Fazzini	Rajadamnern World Series, Rajadamnern Stadium	Bangkok, Thailand	KO (Low kick)	2	2:39
2024-04-06	Win	(China) Yinuo	China Kickboxing Premier League	China	TKO (retirement)	2	3:00
2023-12-30	Win	(Iran) Javad Mohammad	Wu Lin Feng 2023 Year-End Kung Fu Festival	Zhengzhou, China	Decision (Unanimous)	3	3:00
2023-07-29	Win	(France) Endy Patel	Wu Lin Feng 540	Tangshan, China	TKO (Punches)	2	
2023-02-04	Win	(Georgia (country)) Tsotne Sultanishvili	Wu Lin Feng 2023: Chinese New Year	Tangshan, China	Decision (Unanimous)	3	3:00
2022-12-09	Win	(China) Jin Hu	Wu Lin Feng 532, Final	Zhengzhou, China	Decision (Unanimous)	3	3:00
2022-12-09	Win	(China) Yang Ming	Wu Lin Feng 532, Semifinals	Zhengzhou, China	Decision	3	3:00
2022-09-24	Win	(China) Li Xancheng	Wu Lin Feng 531	Zhengzhou, China	Decision (Unanimous)	3	3:00
2022-07-30	Win	(China) Zheng Guanglei	Battle Time Championship	Linyi, China	KO (Left hook to the body)	1	2:20
2022-03-26	Win	(China) Yang Ming	Wu Lin Feng 528, Final	Zhengzhou, China	Decision (Split)	3	3:00
2022-03-26	Win	(China) Zhao Chongyang	Wu Lin Feng 528, Semifinals	Zhengzhou, China	Decision (Split)	3	3:00
2022-01-01	Loss	(China) Yang Ming	Wu Lin Feng 527, WLF World Contender League, Final	Tangshan, China	Decision (Unanimous)	3	3:00
Wu Lin Feng -60 kg World title eliminator.
2021-12-16	Win	(China) Yang Hua	Wu Lin Feng 526, WLF World Contender League, Semifinals	Zhengzhou, China	Decision (Unanimous)	3	3:00
2021-11-27	Win	(Thailand) Lerdsila Chumpairtour	Wu Lin Feng 2021: World Contender League 7th Stage	Zhengzhou, China	Ext.R Decision	4	3:00
2021-09-25	Win	(China) Li Yuankun	Wu Lin Feng 2021: WLF in Tangshan WLF World Contender League	Tangshan, China	Decision (Unanimous)	3	3:00
2021-05-29	Win	(China) Yang Ming	Wu Lin Feng 2021: World Contender League 4th Stage	Zhengzhou, China	Decision (Unanimous)	3	3:00
2021-03-27	Loss	(China) Zhao Jiangfeng	Wu Lin Feng 2021: World Contender League 1st Stage	Zhengzhou, China	Decision (Split)	3	3:00
2020-12-27	Win	(China) Cao Zhiyang	Huya Kung Fu Carnival 3	Beijing, China	TKO (3 Knockdown)	2	1:23
2020-12-19	Win	(China) Zhang Jinhu	Kunlun Combat Professional League	China	TKO (3 Knockdown)	2	1:30
2020-09-29	Win	(China) Liu Wenjie	Kunlun Combat Professional League	China	KO (Head kick)	3	2:52
2020-09-08	Win	(China) Kaijie	Kunlun Combat Professional League	Tongling, China	Decision (Unanimous)	3	3:00
2019-12-16	Loss	(China) Zhao Boshi	ONE Hero Series December	Beijing, China	Decision (Unanimous)	3	3:00
2019-09-23	Win	(China) Dongdong Song	ONE Hero Series September	Beijing, China	Decision (Unanimous)	3	3:00
2019-06-21	Win	(China) Xie Wenjie	Kunlun Combat Professional League	China	TKO (Knee to the head)	2	1:58
2019-06-06	Win	(China) Fang Kejin	Kunlun Combat Professional League	China	TKO (Low kick)	2	
2019-05-19	Win	(China) Zhang Yu	Kunlun Combat Professional League	Tongling, China	KO (Low kick)	3	
2019-04-20	Win	(China) Chen Ming	Kunlun Combat Professional League	China	KO		
2018-11-	Loss	(China) Chen Yahong	Faith Fight Championship	China	Decision	3	3:00
2018-07-28	Loss	(China) Cao Zuoyan	Faith Fight Championship	Shenzhen, China	Decision	3	3:00
2017-10-	Loss	(China) Jiang Feng	Dunhuang Legendary Fighting Championship	China	Decision	3	3:00
Legend: Win Loss Draw/No contest Notes
