= 2020 in Wu Lin Feng =

Chinese kickboxing events

Information
- First date: January 11
- Last date: N/A

Events
- Total events: N/A

Fights

Chronology
| 2019 in Wu Lin Feng | 2020 in Wu Lin Feng | 2021 in Wu Lin Feng |

The year 2020 is the 17th year in the history of the Wu Lin Feng, a Chinese kickboxing promotion. The events are broadcast on Henan Television in mainland China and streamed on Douyin and Xigua Video.

== List of events ==
| No. | Event | Date | Venue | City |
|---|---|---|---|---|
| 13 | Wu Lin Feng 514 | December 22, 2020 | Henan TV Studio 8 | Zhengzhou, China |
| 12 | Wu Lin Feng 513 | November 28, 2020 | Henan TV Studio 8 | Zhengzhou, China |
| 11 | Wu Lin Feng 512 | November 14, 2020 | Henan TV Studio 8 | Zhengzhou, China |
| 10 | Wu Lin Feng 2020: King's Super Cup Final | October 18, 2020 | | Zhengzhou, China |
| 9 | Wu Lin Feng 510 | October 16, 2020 | | Zhengzhou, China |
| 8 | Wu Lin Feng 2020: King's Super Cup 5th Group Stage | September 23, 2020 | | Zhengzhou, China |
| 7 | Wu Lin Feng 2020: China New Kings Tournament Final | August 29, 2020 | | Zhengzhou, China |
| 6 | Wu Lin Feng 2020: King's Super Cup 4th Group Stage | August 3, 2020 | | Zhengzhou, China |
| 5 | Wu Lin Feng 2020: King's Super Cup 3rd Group Stage | July 5, 2020 | | Zhengzhou, China |
| 4 | Wu Lin Feng 2020: King's Super Cup 2nd Group Stage | June 13, 2020 | | Zhengzhou, China |
| 3 | Wu Lin Feng 2020: King's Super Cup 1st Group Stage | May 15, 2020 | | Zhengzhou, China |
| 2 | Wu Lin Feng 2020: WLF World Championship in Baise | January 18, 2020 | | Baise, China |
| 1 | Wu Lin Feng 2020: WLF World Cup 2019-2020 Final | January 11, 2020 | | Zhuhai, China |

== Wu Lin Feng 2020: WLF World Cup 2019-2020 final ==
Wu Lin Feng 2020: WLF World Cup Final
- Promotion: Wu Lin Feng
- Date: January 11, 2020
- City: Zhuhai, China

Wu Lin Feng 2020: WLF World Cup 2019-2020 Final was a kickboxing event held on January 11, 2020 in Zhuhai, China.

=== Results ===
Main Event
| Weight Class | | | | Method | Round | Time | Notes |
|---|---|---|---|---|---|---|---|
| Kickboxing -67kg | (China) Jia Aoqi | def. | (Thailand) Petchtanong Banchamek | Decision (Unanimous) | 3 | 3:00 | WLF World Cup 2019 -67kg Final |
| Kickboxing -80kg | (China) Fu Gaofeng | def. | (Brazil) Jean Carlos Pereira | Decision (Unanimous) | 3 | 3:00 |
| Kickboxing -60kg | (China) Zhu Shuai | def. | (Japan) Hirotaka Asahisa | Decision (Unanimous) | 3 | 3:00 |
| Kickboxing -63kg | (Germany) Dennis Wosik (c) | def. | (China) Fang Feida | Decision (Unanimous) | 5 | 3:00 | WLF -63kg Championship Match |
| Kickboxing - 6kg | (Romania) Adrian Maxim | def. | (China) Wang Pengfei | Decision | 3 | 3:00 |
| Kickboxing -67kg | (China) Jia Aoqi | def. | (Thailand) Tawanchai PK.Saenchaimuaythai | TKO (Punches) | 2 | | WLF World Cup 2019 -67kg Semi-final |
| Kickboxing -67kg | (Thailand) Petchtanong Banchamek | def. | (China) Liu Yaning | TKO | 1 | 0:50 | WLF World Cup 2019 -67kg Semi-final |
| Kickboxing -60kg | (China) Zhao Chongyang | def. | (Portugal) Frederico Cordeiro | Decision (Unanimous) | 3 | 3:00 |
| Kickboxing -60kg | (China) Li Ning | def. | (Armenia) Abraham Grigoryan | Decision | 3 | 3:00 |
| Kickboxing Women -56kg | (Spain) Lara Fernandez | def. | (China) Li Mingrui | Decision (Unanimous) | 3 | 3:00 |
| Kickboxing -65kg | (Greece) Kostas | def. | (China) Pan Jiayun | Decision | 3 | 3:00 |
| Kickboxing -68kg | (China) Guo Wentao | vs. | (Russia) Selianov |
| Kickboxing -66kg | (Iran) Ahmad Nikkarchenjiani | def. | (China) Li Xin | Decision | 3 | 3:00 |

== Wu Lin Feng 2020: WLF World Championship in Baise ==
Wu Lin Feng 2020: WLF World Championship in Baise
- Promotion: Wu Lin Feng
- Date: January 18, 2020
- City: Baise, China

Wu Lin Feng 2020: WLF World Championship in Baise was a kickboxing event held on January 18.

=== Results ===
Main Event
| Weight Class | | | | Method | Round | Time | Notes |
|---|---|---|---|---|---|---|---|
| Kickboxing -65kg | (China) Meng Guodong | def. | (Thailand) Chujaroen Dabransarakarm | Decision (Unanimous) | 3 | 3:00 |
| Kickboxing -90kg | (China) Wu Sihan | def. | (Brazil) Fabiano Hawthorne | KO (Right Cross) | 2 |
| Kickboxing -90kg | (Hungary) Balázs Kiss | def. | (China) Zhou Wei | Decision | 3 | 3:00 |
| Kickboxing -65kg | (China) Liu Xiangming | def. | (Iran) Peyman Ordouzadeh | TKO | 3 |
| Kickboxing -64kg | (China) Zhao Chuanlin | def. | (Madagascar) Razanajatono Fazaraly | Decision (Unanimous) | 3 | 3:00 |
| Kickboxing Women -60kg | (Japan) Marina Kumagai | def. | (China) Yang Yang | Decision (Unanimous) | 3 | 3:00 |
| Kickboxing -60kg | (China) Lan Mingqiang | def. | (Japan) Hiro Yamato | Decision (Unanimous) | 3 | 3:00 |
| Kickboxing -58kg | (China) Li Yuankun | def. | (Thailand) Longoen Dabransarakram | Decision | 3 | 3:00 |
| Kickboxing -64kg | (China) Yang Ming | def. | (Russia) Vladimir Litkyn | TKO (punches) | 2 | 2:00 |
| Kickboxing -63kg | (China) Li Lianbang | def. | (Brazil) Jorge Fernandes | Decision | 3 | 3:00 |

== Wu Lin Feng 2020: King's Super Cup 1st Group Stage ==
Wu Lin Feng 2020: King's Super Cup 1st Group Stage
- Promotion: Wu Lin Feng
- Date: May 15, 2020
- City: Zhengzhou, China

Wu Lin Feng 2020: King's Super Cup 1st Group Stage was a kickboxing event held on May 15.

=== Results ===
Main Event
| Weight Class | Fighter 1 | vs | Fighter 2 | Method | Round | Time | Notes |
|---|---|---|---|---|---|---|---|
| Kickboxing -66kg | (China) Jia Aoqi | def. | (China) Wang Pengfei | Decision (Split) | 3 | 3:00 | King's Super Cup -66kg Group Stage |
| Kickboxing -70kg | (China) Pu Dongdong | def. | (China) Wu Xuesong | Decision (Unanimous) | 3 | 3:00 | China Tournament -70kg Group Stage |
| Kickboxing -70kg | (China) Ouyang Feng | def. | (China) Song Shaoqiu | Decision (Unanimous) | 3 | 3:00 | China Tournament -70kg Group Stage |
| Kickboxing -70kg | (China) Liu Yaning | def. | (China) Cheng Zisa | Decision | 3 | 3:00 | China Tournament -70kg Group Stage |
| Kickboxing -70kg | (China) Li Shiyuan | def. | (China) Ji Xiang | Decision (Unanimous) | 3 | 3:00 | China Tournament -70kg Group Stage |
| Kickboxing -75kg | (China) Xu Yuanqing | def. | (China) Li Hui | Decision | 3 | 3:00 |
| Kickboxing -61kg | (China) Wang Wanben | def. | (China) Wang Junyu | Decision | 3 | 3:00 |
| Kickboxing -65kg | (China) Li Xin | def. | (China) Guo Wentao | Decision | 3 | 3:00 | China Tournament -65kg Group Stage |
| Kickboxing -65kg | (China) Zhao Chuanlin | def. | (China) Zhang Mengfei | Decision | 3 | 3:00 | China Tournament -65kg Group Stage |
| Kickboxing -65kg | (China) Meng Gaofeng | def. | (China) Bai Lishuai | Decision | 3 | 3:00 | China Tournament -65kg Group Stage |
| Kickboxing -65kg | (China) Kong Dexiang | def. | (China) Pan Jiayun | Decision | 3 | 3:00 | China Tournament -65kg Group Stage |
| Kickboxing -63kg | (China) Jin Ying | def. | (China) Zhu Shuai | Decision (Unanimous) | 3 | 3:00 | King's Super Cup -63kg Group Stage |
| Kickboxing -63kg | (China) Jiduo Yibu | def. | (China) Liu Chunrui | Decision | 3 | 3:00 | China Tournament -63kg Group Stage |
| Kickboxing -63kg | (China) Zheng Junfeng | def. | (China) Wang Wanli | Decision | 3 | 3:00 | China Tournament -63kg Group Stage |
| Kickboxing -63kg | (China) Zhang Jun | def. | (China) Ma Yunkang | KO | | | China Tournament -63kg Group Stage |
| Kickboxing -63kg | (China) Wang Zhiwei | def. | (China) Li Tao | Decision | 3 | 3:00 | China Tournament -63kg Group Stage |
| Kickboxing -63kg | (China) Fang Feida | def. | (China) Zhao Chongyang | TKO (2 Knockdowns rule/Punches) | 1 | | King's Super Cup -63kg Group Stage |
| Kickboxing -60kg | (China) Yang Ming | def. | (China) Zhao Zhanshi | Decision (Unanimous) | 3 | 3:00 | China Tournament -60kg Group Stage |
| Kickboxing -60kg | (China) Zhao Jiangfeng | def. | (China) Xue Shenzhe | Ext.R Decision (Unanimous) | 4 | 3:00 | China Tournament -60kg Group Stage |
| Kickboxing -60kg | (China) Zhao Boshi | def. | (China) Zhang Lanpei | Decision (Unanimous) | 3 | 3:00 | China Tournament -60kg Group Stage |
| Kickboxing -60kg | (China) Li Yuankun | def. | (China) Zhang Jinhu | Ext.R Decision (Unanimous) | 4 | 3:00 | China Tournament -60kg Group Stage |

== Wu Lin Feng 2020: King's Super Cup 2nd Group Stage ==
Wu Lin Feng 2020: King's Super Cup 2nd Group Stage
- Promotion: Wu Lin Feng
- Date: June 13, 2020
- City: Zhengzhou, China

Wu Lin Feng 2020: King's Super Cup 2nd Group Stage was a kickboxing event held on June 13.

=== Results ===
Main Event
| Weight Class | | | | Method | Round | Time | Notes |
|---|---|---|---|---|---|---|---|
| Kickboxing -66kg | (China) Wei Rui | def. | (China) Wang Pengfei | Decision (Unanimous) | 3 | 3:00 | King's Super Cup -66kg Group Stage |
| Kickboxing -66kg | (China) Liu Xiangming | def. | (China) Jia Aoqi | KO (High Kick) | 2 | | King's Super Cup -66kg Group Stage |
| Kickboxing -63kg | (China) Jin Ying | def. | (China) Zhao Chongyang | TKO | 1 | 1:38 | King's Super Cup -63kg Group Stage |
| Kickboxing -60kg | (China) Li Yuankun | def. | (China) Zhao Boshi | Ext.R Decision (Decision) | 4 | 3:00 | China Tournament -60kg Group Stage |
| Kickboxing -60kg | (China) Zhang Jinhu | def. | (China) Zhang Lanpei | Decision | 3 | 3:00 | China Tournament -60kg Group Stage |
| Kickboxing -60kg | (China) Xue Shenzhen | def. | (China) Zhao Zhanshi | TKO (Towel thrown) | | | China Tournament -60kg Group Stage |
| Kickboxing -60kg | (China) Yang Ming | def. | (China) Zhao Jiangfeng | Decision | 3 | 3:00 | China Tournament -60kg Group Stage |
| Kickboxing -63kg | (China) Wang Zhiwei | def. | (China) Wei Weiyang | Ext.R KO (Hook to the Body) | 4 | 1:50 | China Tournament -63kg Group Stage |
| Kickboxing -63kg | (China) Zhang Jun | def. | (China) Lin Yiming | TKO (Doctor Stoppage) | 3 | 0:45 | China Tournament -63kg Group Stage |
| Kickboxing -63kg | (China) Zheng Junfeng | def. | (China) Jiduo Yibu | Decision | 3 | 3:00 | China Tournament -63kg Group Stage |
| Kickboxing -63kg | (China) Liu Chunrui | def. | (China) Wang Wanli | Decision | 3 | 3:00 | China Tournament -63kg Group Stage |
| Kickboxing -70kg | (China) Li Xiyuan | def. | (China) Liu Yaning | Decision | 3 | 3:00 | China Tournament -70kg Group Stage |
| Kickboxing -70kg | (China) Ji Xiang | def. | (China) Cheng Zisa | Decision | 3 | 3:00 | China Tournament -70kg Group Stage |
| Kickboxing -70kg | (China) Song Shaoqiu | def. | (China) Pu Dongdong | Decision | 3 | 3:00 | China Tournament -70kg Group Stage |
| Kickboxing -70kg | (China) Ouyang Feng | def. | (China) Wu Xuesong | TKO | 1 | | China Tournament -70kg Group Stage |
| Kickboxing -65kg | (China) Pan Jiayun | def. | (China) Ren Guohao | Decision | 3 | 3:00 | China Tournament -65kg Group Stage |
| Kickboxing -65kg | (China) Meng Gaofeng | def. | (China) Kong Dexiang | Decision | 3 | 3:00 | China Tournament -65kg Group Stage |
| Kickboxing -65kg | (China) Zhao Chuanlin | def. | (China) Guo Wentao | Decision | 3 | 3:00 | China Tournament -65kg Group Stage |
| Kickboxing -65kg | (China) Li Xin | def. | (China) Zhang Mengfei | Ext.R Decision | 4 | 3:00 | China Tournament -65kg Group Stage |
| Kickboxing -63kg | (China) Tien Linkun | def. | (China) Li Lienban | KO | 1 |

== Wu Lin Feng 2020: King's Super Cup 3rd Group Stage ==
Wu Lin Feng 2020: King's Super Cup 3rd Group Stage
- Promotion: Wu Lin Feng
- Date: July 05, 2020
- City: Zhengzhou, China

Wu Lin Feng 2020: King's Super Cup 3rd Group Stage was a kickboxing event held on July 5.

=== Results ===
Main Event
| Weight Class | | | | Method | Round | Time | Notes |
|---|---|---|---|---|---|---|---|
| Kickboxing -63kg | (China) Jin Ying | def. | (China) Fang Feida | Decision | 3 | 3:00 | King's Super Cup -63kg Group Stage |
| Kickboxing -63kg | (China) Wang Zhiwei | def. | (China) Zhang Jun | Decision | 3 | 3:00 | China Tournament -63kg Group Stage |
| Kickboxing -63kg | (China) Zheng Junfeng | def. | (China) Liu Chunrui | Decision | 3 | 3:00 | China Tournament -63kg Group Stage |
| Kickboxing -63kg | (China) Jiduo Yibu | def. | (China) Wang Wanli | Decision | 3 | 3:00 | China Tournament -63kg Group Stage |
| Kickboxing -60kg | (China) Yang Ming | def. | (China) Xue Shenzen | Decision | 3 | 3:00 | China Tournament -60kg Group Stage |
| Kickboxing -60kg | (China) Zhao Jiangfeng | def. | (China) Song Dongdong | TKO | 2 | | China Tournament -60kg Group Stage |
| Kickboxing -60kg | (China) Zhao Boshi | def. | (China) Jin Hu | Decision | 3 | 3:00 | China Tournament -60kg Group Stage |
| Kickboxing -60kg | (China) Zhang Lanpei | def. | (China) Li Yuankun | Ext.R Decision | 4 | 3:00 | China Tournament -60kg Group Stage |
| Kickboxing -75kg | (China) Shu Yuenxing | def. | (China) Li Hui | Decision | 3 | 3:00 |
| Kickboxing -65kg | (China) Kong Dexiang | def. | (China) Ren Guohao | Decision | 3 | 3:00 | China Tournament -65kg Group Stage |
| Kickboxing -65kg | (China) Pan Jiayun | def. | (China) Meng Gaofeng | Decision | 3 | 3:00 | China Tournament -65kg Group Stage |
| Kickboxing -65kg | (China) Guo Wentao | def. | (China) Zhang Mengfei | Decision | 3 | 3:00 | China Tournament -65kg Group Stage |
| Kickboxing -65kg | (China) Zhao Chuanlin | def. | (China) Li Xin | Decision | 3 | 3:00 | China Tournament -65kg Group Stage |
| Kickboxing -70kg | (China) Shuai Qi | def. | (China) Zhang Xuqiang | TKO | 1 |
| Kickboxing -70kg | (China) Song Shaoqiu | def. | (China) Wu Xuesong | KO (Knee) | 1 | 3:00 | China Tournament -70kg Group Stage |
| Kickboxing -70kg | (China) Ji Xiang | def. | (China) Liu Yaning | Decision (Unanimous) | | | China Tournament -70kg Group Stage |
| Kickboxing Women -57kg | (China) Li Mingrui | def. | (China) Wu Yi | KO (Body Punches) | 2 | 3:00 |
| Kickboxing -60kg | (China) Lu Baoming | def. | (China) You Guocheng | Decision (Unanimous) | 3 | 3:00 |
| Kickboxing -68kg | (China) Shang Xifeng | def. | (China) Ma Yixian | Decision (Unanimous) | 3 | 3:00 |

== Wu Lin Feng 2020: King's Super Cup 4th Group Stage ==
Wu Lin Feng 2020: King's Super Cup 4th Group Stage
- Promotion: Wu Lin Feng
- Date: August 03, 2020
- City: Zhengzhou, China

Wu Lin Feng 2020: King's Super Cup 4th Group Stage was a kickboxing event held on August 3.

=== Results ===
Main Event
| Weight Class | | | | Method | Round | Time | Notes |
|---|---|---|---|---|---|---|---|
| Kickboxing -66kg | (China) Wei Rui | def. | (China) Liu Xiangming | Decision (Unanimous) | 3 | 3:00 | King's Super Cup -66kg Group Stage |
| Kickboxing -63kg | (China) Zhu Shuai | def. | (China) Fang Feida | Decision | 3 | 3:00 | King's Super Cup -63kg Group Stage |
| Kickboxing -63kg | (China) Wang Zhiwei | def. | (China) Jiduo Yibu | Decision | 3 | 3:00 | China Tournament -63kg Semi-finals |
| Kickboxing -63kg | (China) Zheng Junfeng | def. | (China) Zhang Jun | Decision | 3 | 3:00 | China Tournament -63kg Semi-finals |
| Kickboxing -65kg | (China) Meng Gaofeng | def. | (China) Zhao Chuanlin | Decision | 3 | 3:00 | China Tournament -65kg Semi-finals |
| Kickboxing -65kg | (China) Pan Jiayun | def. | (China) Li Xin | Decision | 3 | 3:00 | China Tournament -65kg Semi-finals |
| Kickboxing -60kg | (China) Zhao Boshi | def. | (China) Zhao Jiangfeng | Decision | 3 | 3:00 | China Tournament -60kg Semi-finals |
| Kickboxing -60kg | (China) Yang Ming | def. | (China) Jin Hu | Decision | 3 | 3:00 | China Tournament -60kg Semi-finals |
| Kickboxing -70kg | (China) Ouyang Feng | def. | (China) Ji Xiang | Ext.R Decision | 4 | 3:00 | China Tournament -70kg Semi-finals |
| Kickboxing -70kg | (China) Song Shaoqiu | def. | (China) Li Shiyuan | Decision | 3 | 3:00 | China Tournament -70kg Semi-finals |
| Kickboxing -75kg | (China) Lin Fanhao | def. | (China) Zhu Baotong | Decision | 3 | 3:00 | China Tournament -75kg Group Stage |
| Kickboxing -75kg | (China) Li Hui | def. | (China) Feng Xingli | Decision | 3 | 3:00 | China Tournament -75kg Group Stage |
| Kickboxing -75kg | (China) Wu Sihan | def. | (China) Jiao Fukai | Decision | 3 | 3:00 | China Tournament -75kg Group Stage |
| Kickboxing -75kg | (China) Lin Fanhao | def. | (China) Zhu Baotong | Decision | 3 | 3:00 | China Tournament -75kg Group Stage |
| Kickboxing -75kg | (China) Shu Yuenqing | def. | (China) Ni Jun | Decision | 3 | 3:00 | China Tournament -75kg Group Stage |
| Kickboxing -70kg | (China) Shuai Qi | def. | (China) Xu Liu | Decision | 3 | 3:00 |
| Kickboxing -67kg | (China) Hu Zheng | def. | (China) Wu Jianguo | Decision | 3 | 3:00 |
| Kickboxing -65kg | (China) Zhou Yi | def. | (China) Er Kang | Decision | 3 | 3:00 |
| Kickboxing Women -52kg | (China) Sun Luyao | def. | (China) Li Lishan | Decision | 3 | 3:00 |
| Kickboxing -63kg | (China) Lin Yiming | vs. | (China) Ma Yunkang |
| Kickboxing -84kg | (China) Liu Dacheng | def. | (China) Bo Fufan | Decision | 3 | 3:00 |
| Kickboxing -80kg | (China) Yang Guang | def. | (China) Wang Shengjun | TKO | 1 | 1:09 |

== Wu Lin Feng 2020: China New Kings Tournament final ==
Wu Lin Feng 2020: China New Kings Tournament Final
- Promotion: Wu Lin Feng
- Date: August 29, 2020
- City: Zhengzhou, China

Wu Lin Feng 2020: China New Kings Tournament Final was a kickboxing event held on August 29.

=== Results ===
Main Event
| Weight Class | | | | Method | Round | Time | Notes |
|---|---|---|---|---|---|---|---|
| Kickboxing -68kg | (China) Wang Pengfei | def. | (China) Zang Chunyu | Decision | 3 | 3:00 |
| Kickboxing -70kg | (China) Ouyang Feng | def. | (China) Song Shaoqiu | TKO (Low Kicks) | 2 | 2:32 | China New King Tournament -70kg Final and IPCC title fight |
| Kickboxing -65kg | (China) Meng Gaofeng | def. | (China) Pan Jiayun | KO (3 Knockdowns/punches) | 1 | 1:48 | China New King Tournament -65kg Final & IPCC title |
| Kickboxing -63kg | (China) Zheng Junfeng | def. | (China) Wang Zhiwei | Decision | 3 | 3:00 | China New King Tournament -63kg Final |
| Kickboxing -60kg | (China) Yang Ming | def. | (China) Zhao Jiangfeng | Decision | 3 | 3:00 | China New King Tournament -60kg Final & IPCC title |
| Kickboxing -63kg | (China) Zhang Lanpei | def. | (China) Wang Junyu | Decision | 3 | 3:00 |
| Kickboxing -75kg | (China) Ding Meng | def. | (China) Xu Yuanqing | Decision | 3 | 3:00 | China New King Tournament -75kg Group Stage |
| Kickboxing -75kg | (China) Li Hui | def. | (China) Yang Guang | Decision | 3 | 3:00 | China New King Tournament -75kg Group Stage |
| Kickboxing -75kg | (China) Zhu Baotong | def. | (China) Chang Juncheng | Decision | 3 | 3:00 | China New King Tournament -75kg Group Stage |
| Kickboxing -75kg | (China) Lin Fianhao | def. | (China) Wu Sihan | Decision | 3 | 3:00 | China New King Tournament -75kg Group Stage |
| Kickboxing Women | (China) Sun Luyao | def. | (China) Liu Yue | Decision | 3 | 3:00 |
| Kickboxing -68kg | (China) Er Kang | def. | (China) Zhang Mengfei | Ext.R Decision | 4 | 3:00 |
| Kickboxing -65kg | (China) Kong Dexiang | def. | (China) Li Tao | Decision | 3 | 3:00 |
| Kickboxing -66kg | (China) Zhou Yi | def. | (China) Shang Xifeng | Decision | 3 | 3:00 |
| Kickboxing -63kg | (China) Shun Li | def. | (China) Zhang Jingtao | TKO (3 Knockdowns/Spinning back kick) | 1 | 2:58 |
| Kickboxing -60kg | (China) Wang Jinyuang | def. | (China) Lu Baoming | Decision | 3 | 3:00 |
| Kickboxing Women -56kg | (China) Wu Yi | def. | (China) Ding Sai | Decision | 3 | 3:00 |

== Wu Lin Feng 2020: King's Super Cup 5th Group Stage ==
Wu Lin Feng 2020: King's Super Cup 5th Group Stage
- Promotion: Wu Lin Feng
- Date: September 23, 2020
- City: Zhengzhou, China

Wu Lin Feng 2020: King's Super Cup 5th Group Stage was a kickboxing event held on September 23.

=== Results ===
Main Event
| Weight Class | | | | Method | Round | Time | Notes |
|---|---|---|---|---|---|---|---|
| Kickboxing -66kg | (China) Wei Rui | def. | (China) Jia Aoqi | Decision (Unanimous) | 3 | 3:00 | King's Super Cup -66kg Group Stage |
| Kickboxing -75kg | (China) Wu SIhan | def. | (China) Zhang Yonquang | Decision | 3 | 3:00 | China New Kings Tournament -75kg Group Stage |
| Kickboxing -75kg | (China) Lin Fianhao | def. | (China) Cheng Juncheng | Decision | 3 | 3:00 | China New Kings Tournament -75kg Group Stage |
| Kickboxing -75kg | (China) Li Hui | def. | (China) Xu Yuanqing | Decision | 3 | 3:00 | China New Kings Tournament -75kg Group Stage |
| Kickboxing -75kg | (China) Ding Meng | def. | (China) Yang Guang | TKO | 2 | | China New Kings Tournament -75kg Group Stage |
| Kickboxing -70kg | (China) Wu Shixie | def. | (China) Cheng Zisa | KO (Left Hook) | 2 |
| Kickboxing -63kg | (China) Zhu Shuai | def. | (China) Ma Yunkang | Decision (Unanimous) | 3 | 3:00 |
| Kickboxing -66kg | (China) Zhou Yi | vs. | (China) Hu Zheng |
| Kickboxing -65kg | (China) Zhao Chuanlin | vs. | (China) Er Kang |
| Kickboxing -66kg | (China) Xie Yuhang | vs. | (China) Shang Xifeng |
| Kickboxing Women -51kg | (China) Sun Luyao | vs. | (China) Que Yannan |
| Kickboxing -70kg | (China) Xu Liu | def. | (China) Liu Guicheng | KO (Low Kick) | 3 |
| Kickboxing -70kg | (China) Liu Lei | def. | (China) Zhao Xiaoyu | Decision (Unanimous) | 3 | 3:00 |
| Kickboxing -63kg | (China) Shun li | def. | (China) Zhang Jun | Ext.R Decision | 4 | 3:00 |
| Kickboxing -60kg | (China) Zhao Zhanshi | def. | (China) Lu Baoming | Decision (Unanimous) | 3 | 3:00 |
| Kickboxing -60kg | (China) Zhao Boshi | def. | (China) Feng Tienhao | Decision (Unanimous) | 3 | 3:00 |
| Kickboxing -60kg | (China) Li Yuankun | def. | (China) Jin Hu | Decision (Unanimous) | 3 | 3:00 |
| Kickboxing -66kg | (China) Zhang Songshan | def. | (China) Zhang Jian | KO (Punches) | 2 |
| Kickboxing -59kg | (China) Yuan Zhibin | def. | (China) Chang Yuanmeng | Decision (Unanimous) | 3 | 3:00 |

== Wu Lin Feng 2020: China New Kings Champions Challenge match ==
Wu Lin Feng 2020: China New Kings Champions Challenge match
- Promotion: Wu Lin Feng
- Date: October 16, 2020
- City: Hangzhou, China

Wu Lin Feng 2020: China New Kings Champions Challenge match was a kickboxing event held on October 16.

=== Results ===
Main Event
| Weight Class | | | | Method | Round | Time | Notes |
|---|---|---|---|---|---|---|---|
| Kickboxing -68kg | (China) Wei Ninghui | def. | (China) Wang Pengfei | Decision | 3 | 3:00 |
| Kickboxing -93kg | (China) Hao Guanghua | def. | (China) Zhang Shaibao | Decision | 3 | 3:00 |
| Kickboxing -60kg | (China) Lu Baoming | def. | (China) Huang Gaogang | KO (Body Kick) |
| Kickboxing -71kg | (China) Li Shiyuan | def. | (China) Wu Shijie | Decision | 3 | 3:00 |
| Kickboxing Women -51kg | (China) Liu Yue | def. | (China) Que Yannan | Decision | 3 | 3:00 |
| Kickboxing -61kg | (China) Wang Jingyuan | def. | (China) Pan Shaowei | Decision | 3 | 3:00 |
| Kickboxing -85kg | (China) Liu Dacheng | def. | (China) Zhou Wei | Ext.R Decision | 4 | 3:00 |
| Kickboxing -67kg | (China) Guo Xiaowei | def. | (China) Zhang Zihao | Decision | 3 | 3:00 |
| Kickboxing -63kg | (China) Liu Wei | def. | (China) Zheng Junfeng | Ext.R Decision | 4 | 3:00 |
| Kickboxing -60kg | (China) Yang Ming | def. | (China) Wei Weiyang | Decision | 3 | 3:00 |
| Kickboxing -63kg | (China) Gao Weijun | def. | (China) Hu Hongyu | Decision | 3 | 3:00 |
| Kickboxing -58kg | (China) Qumu Xifu | def. | (China) Zhang Ziqiang | TKO (Punches) | 1 |

== Wu Lin Feng 2020: King's Super Cup final ==
Wu Lin Feng 2020: King's Super Cup Final
- Promotion: Wu Lin Feng
- Date: October 18, 2020
- City: Dengzhou, China

Wu Lin Feng 2020: King's Super Cup Final was a kickboxing event held on October 18.

=== Results ===
Main Event
| Weight Class | | | | Method | Round | Time | Notes |
|---|---|---|---|---|---|---|---|
| Kickboxing -66kg | (China) Wei Rui | def. | (China) Jin Ying | Decision (Unanimous) | 3 | 3:00 | King's Super Cup Final |
| Kickboxing -65kg | (China) Meng Guodong | def. | (China) Zhao Chuanlin | Decision (Unanimous) | 3 | 3:00 | WLF China -65kg Championship Tournament Final & IPCC title |
| Kickboxing -68kg | (China) Tie Yinghua | def. | (China) Liu Yaning | Decision (Unanimous) | 3 | 3:00 |
| Kickboxing -75kg | (China) Li Hui | def. | (China) Ding Meng | Decision | 3 | 3:00 | China New Kings Tournament -75kg Final |
| Kickboxing -66kg | (China) Kong Dexiang | def. | (China) Er Kang | Decision | 3 | 3:00 |
| Kickboxing -65kg | (China) Meng Guodong | def. | (China) Xie Yuhang | KO (Straight to the Body) | 1 | | WLF China -65kg Championship Tournament Semi-finals |
| Kickboxing -65kg | (China) Zhao Chuanlin | def. | (China) Pan Jiayun | Ext.R Decision | 4 | 3:00 | WLF China -65kg Championship Tournament Semi-finals |
| Kickboxing -75kg | (China) Ding Meng | def. | (China) Lin Fianhao | Decision | 3 | 3:00 | China New Kings Tournament -75kg Semi-finals |
| Kickboxing -75kg | (China) Li Hui | def. | (China) Wu Sihan | KO (Right Hook) | 1 | | China New Kings Tournament -75kg Semi-finals |
| Kickboxing -65kg | (China) Xie Yuhang | def. | (China) Tang Yao | Decision (Unanimous) | 3 | 3:00 | WLF China -65kg Championship Tournament Quarter-finals |
| Kickboxing -65kg | (China) Meng Guodong | def. | (China) Hu Zheng | KO (Punches) | 1 | 1:10 | WLF China -65kg Championship Tournament Quarter-finals |
| Kickboxing -65kg | (China) Pan Jiayun | def. | (China) Zhang Songshan | Decision (Unanimous) | 3 | 3:00 | WLF China -65kg Championship Tournament Quarter-finals |
| Kickboxing -65kg | (China) Zhao Chuanlin | def. | (China) Shang Xifeng | Decision (Unanimous) | 3 | 3:00 | WLF China -65kg Championship Tournament Quarter-finals |
| Kickboxing -65kg | (China) Li Tao | def. | (China) Huang Yong Zhang | Decision | 3 | 3:00 |

== Wu Lin Feng 2020: China 60kg & 63kg Championship Tournament ==
Wu Lin Feng 2020: China 60kg & 63kg Championship Tournament
- Promotion: Wu Lin Feng
- Date: November 14, 2020
- City: Zhengzhou, China

Wu Lin Feng 2020: China 60kg & 63kg Championship Tournament was a kickboxing event held on November 14.

=== Results ===
Main Event
| Weight Class | | | | Method | Round | Time | Notes |
|---|---|---|---|---|---|---|---|
| Kickboxing -63kg | (China) Zhu Shuai | def. | (China) Wang Zhiwei | Decision (Unanimous) | 3 | 3:00 | China 63kg Championship Tournament Final |
| Kickboxing -61kg | (China) Wang Wanli | vs. | (China) Zhao Zhangshi |
| Kickboxing Women -56kg | (China) Li Mingrui | def. | (China) Zhang Meng | Decision | 3 | 3:00 |
| Kickboxing -60kg | (China) Zhang Lanpei | def. | (China) Zhao Chongyang | TKO (Punches & Knee) | 1 | 2:05 | China 60kg Championship Tournament Final |
| Kickboxing -60kg | (China) Lu Baoming | def. | (China) Tong Kelei | TKO (Towel thrown) | 1 |
| Kickboxing Women -57kg | (China) Han Xin | def. | (China) Wu Yi | KO (Knee to the body) | 3 |
| Kickboxing -63kg | (China) Zhu Shuai | def. | (China) Ma Yunkang | KO (High kick) | 2 | | China 63kg Championship Tournament Semi-final |
| Kickboxing -63kg | (China) Wang Zhiwei | def. | (China) Shun Li | KO (Left Hook) | 1 | 0:30 | China 63kg Championship Tournament Semi-final |
| Kickboxing -60kg | (China) Zhao Chongyang | def. | (China) Wang Junyu | Decision (Unanimous) | 3 | 3:00 | China 60kg Championship Tournament Semi-final |
| Kickboxing -60kg | (China) Zhang Lanpei | def. | (China) Zhao Boshi | KO (Low Kick) | 1 | | China 60kg Championship Tournament Semi-final |
| Kickboxing -61kg | (China) Wang Wenben | def. | (China) Zhao Zhanshi | Decision | 3 | 3:00 |
| Kickboxing -63kg | (China) Zhu Shuai | def. | (China) Fang Feida | KO (2 Knockdowns/Left Hook) | 2 | 2:40 | China 63kg Championship Tournament Quarter-final |
| Kickboxing -63kg | (China) Ma Yunkang | def. | (China) Wang Jiale | Decision | 3 | 3:00 | China 63kg Championship Tournament Quarter-final |
| Kickboxing -63kg | (China) Wang Zhiwei | def. | (China) Zhang Jun | KO (Spinning Back Head Kick) | 3 | | China 63kg Championship Tournament Quarter-final |
| Kickboxing -63kg | (China) Shun Li | def. | (China) Jin Ying | Decision (Unanimous) | 3 | 3:00 | China 63kg Championship Tournament Quarter-final |
| Kickboxing -60kg | (China) Zhao Boshi | def. | (China) Zhao Jiangfeng | Decision (Unanimous) | | | China 60kg Championship Tournament Quarter-final |
| Kickboxing -60kg | (China) Zhang Lanpei | def. | (China) Xue Shenzheng | TKO (Punches & knees) | 1 | 2:40 | China 60kg Championship Tournament Quarter-final |
| Kickboxing -60kg | (China) Wang Junyu | def. | (China) Yang Hua | Decision (Unanimous) | 3 | 3:00 | China 60kg Championship Tournament Quarter-final |
| Kickboxing -60kg | (China) Zhao Chongyang | def. | (China) Li Yuankun | KO (High Knee) | 1 | 0:40 | China 60kg Championship Tournament Quarter-final |
| Kickboxing -65kg | (China) Li Haolong | def. | (China) Li Tao | Decision | 3 | 3:00 |

== Wu Lin Feng 2020: China 70kg Championship Tournament ==
Wu Lin Feng 2020: China 70kg Championship Tournament
- Promotion: Wu Lin Feng
- Date: November 28, 2020
- City: Zhengzhou, China

Wu Lin Feng 2020: China 70kg Championship Tournament was a kickboxing event held on November 28.

=== Results ===
Main Event
| Weight Class | | | | Method | Round | Time | Notes |
|---|---|---|---|---|---|---|---|
| Kickboxing -70kg | (China) Liu Lei | def. | (China) Luo Chao | Decision | 3 | 3:00 | China 70kg Championship Tournament Final |
| Kickboxing -69kg | (China) Ji Xiang | def. | (China) Jia Aoqi | TKO (High Knee) | 2 |
| Kickboxing -79kg | (China) Fu Gaofeng | def. | (China) Luo Can | Decision | 3 | 3:00 |
| Kickboxing -70kg | (China) Luo Chao | def. | (China) Wu Shijie | Decision | 3 | 3:00 | China 70kg Championship Tournament Semi-final |
| Kickboxing -70kg | (China) Liu Lei | def. | (China) Han Wenbao | Decision (Unanimous) | 3 | 3:00 | China 70kg Championship Tournament Semi-final |
| Kickboxing -75kg | (China) Zhang Kaiyin | def. | (China) Tan Xiaofeng | Decision | 3 | 3:00 |
| Kickboxing -75kg | (China) Li Hui | def. | (China) Jiao Fukai | Decision | 3 | 3:00 |
| Kickboxing -70kg | (China) Ouyang Feng | def. | (China) Li Jiesheng | KO | 1 | 1:58 |
| Kickboxing -65kg | (China) Meng Gaofeng | def. | (China) Pan Jiayun | Decision | 3 | 3:00 |
| Kickboxing -62kg | (China) Yang Ming | def. | (China) Wang Junyu | Decision | 3 | 3:00 |
| Kickboxing -70kg | (China) Luo Chao | def. | (China) Li Shiyuan | Decision (Unanimous) | 3 | 3:00 | China 70kg Championship Tournament Quarter-final |
| Kickboxing -70kg | (China) Wu Shijie | def. | (China) Song Shaoqiu | Decision | 3 | 3:00 | China 70kg Championship Tournament Quarter-final |
| Kickboxing -70kg | (China) Han Wenbao | def. | (China) Xu Liu | Decision (Unanimous) | 3 | 3:00 | China 70kg Championship Tournament Quarter-final |
| Kickboxing -70kg | (China) Liu Lei | def. | (China) Hao Menghui | TKO (2 Knockdowns/Left Hook to the Body) | 1 | 2:51 | China 70kg Championship Tournament Quarter-final |
| Kickboxing -58kg | (China) Yuan Zhibin | def. | (China) Wei Bowei | Decision (Unanimous) | 3 | 3:00 |
| Kickboxing -63kg | (China) Zhang Jingtao | def. | (China) Liu Qing | Decision (Unanimous) | 3 | 3:00 |

== Wu Lin Feng 2020: Women's 52kg Championship Tournament ==
Wu Lin Feng 2020: Women's 52kg Championship Tournament
- Promotion: Wu Lin Feng
- Date: December 22, 2020
- City: Zhengzhou, China

Wu Lin Feng 2020: Women's 52kg Championship Tournament was a kickboxing event held on December 22.

=== Results ===
Main Event
| Weight Class | | | | Method | Round | Time | Notes |
|---|---|---|---|---|---|---|---|
| Kickboxing -65kg | (China) Wei Rui | def. | (Thailand) Thodkhui MR.Manas | KO (Left Head Kick) | 2 |
| Kickboxing -52kg | (China) Liu Yuer | def. | (China) Li Lishan | Decision (Unanimous) | 3 | 3:00 | WLF Women's 52kg Championship Tournament Final & IPCC China title |
| Kickboxing -60kg | (China) Zhang Lanpei | def. | (China) Yang Ming | Decision | 3 | 3:00 |
| Kickboxing -60kg | (China) Zhao Boshi | def. | (China) Li Ning | KO |
| Kickboxing -72kg | (China) Xu Liu | def. | (China) Han Feilong | Decision | 3 | 3:00 |
| Kickboxing -57kg | (China) Han Xin | def. | (China) Zhang Meng | Decision | 3 | 3:00 |
| Kickboxing -88kg | (China) Liu Ce | def. | (China) Zhou Wei | Decision (Unanimous) | 3 | 3:00 |
| Kickboxing -65kg | (China) Liu Zhengyu | def. | (China) Kong Dexiang | Decision | 3 | 3:00 |
| Kickboxing -52kg | (China) Li Lishan | def. | (China) Cheng Yanang | Decision | 3 | 3:00 | WLF Women's 52kg Championship Tournament Semi-final |
| Kickboxing -52kg | (China) Liu Yuer | def. | (China) Sun Luyao | Decision | 3 | 3:00 | WLF Women's 52kg Championship Tournament Semi-final |
| Kickboxing -65kg | (China) Er Kang | def. | (China) Zhang Songshang | Decision | 3 | 3:00 |
| Kickboxing -67kg | (China) Li Haolong | def. | (China) Li Tao | Decision | 3 | 3:00 |

== See also ==
- 2020 in Glory
- 2020 in K-1
- 2020 in Kunlun Fight
- 2020 in ONE Championship
- 2020 in Romanian kickboxing
