= Zhao Boshi =

Chinese kickboxer (born 1994)

- Born: 赵博士; June 5, 1994 (age 32); Zhoukou, China
- Nationality: Chinese
- Height: 168 cm (5 ft 6 in)
- Weight: 60 kg (130 lb; 9.4 st)
- Fighting out of: Shandong, China
- Team: Elephant King Fighting
- Years active: 2018 - present

Kickboxing record
- Total: 20
- Wins: 16
- By knockout: 3
- Losses: 4
- By knockout: 1

Zhao Boshi (born June 5, 1994) is a Chinese kickboxer, currently competing in the -60 kg division of Wu Lin Feng. Between November 2021 and April 2022, Combat Press ranked him among the top ten bantamweight kickboxers in the world.

== Kickboxing career ==
Zhao made his professional debut against Yusuke Kojima at Wu Lin Feng 2018: World Championship Yichun on May 19, 2018. He won the fight by a second-round knockout. Zhao next faced Michel Olensky at Wu Lin Feng 2018: China vs Netherlands & Russia on June 16, 2018. He won the fight by unanimous decision.

Zhao made three appearances with ONE Championship soon after his debut, competing in the ONE Hero Series. He would notch two victories with the promotion, unanimous decision wins against Liu Hai Yang at ONE Hero Series August on August 26, 2019, and Huang Shuailu at ONE Hero Series December on December 16, 2019, while suffering one loss at the hands of Zhang Tao at ONE Hero Series November on November 18, 2019.

Zhao faced Spyro Besiri at Wu Lin Feng 2019: WLF in Manila on October 23, 2019. He won the fight by technical knockout, after Besiri injured his right hand midway through the final round.

Zhao took part in the 2020 Wu Lin Feng -60 kg Championship Tournament, which was held on November 14, 2020. Although he was able to beat Zhao Jiangfeng by unanimous decision in the quarterfinals of the one-day tournament, he himself lost the semifinal bout against the eventual tournament winner Zhang Lanpei by unanimous decision.

Zhao faced Zhang Lanpei at Wu Lin Feng 2021: World Contender League 1st Stage on March 27, 2021, in his first fight of the year. He won the fight by unanimous decision. Zhao next faced Yang Hua at Wu Lin Feng 2021: World Contender League 4th Stage on May 29, 2021. He won the fight by unanimous decision. The pair fought a rematch at Wu Lin Feng 2021: WLF in Tangshan on September 25, 2021. Zhao prevailed once again, winning the fight by unanimous decision.

== Fight record ==
Professional kickboxing record
16 wins (3 (T)KOs), 4 losses, 0 draws, 0 no contests
Date	Result	Opponent	Event	Location	Method	Round	Time
2023-09-14		(China) Ma Qiang	TOP World Fighting Championship	China			
2022-03-26	Loss	(China) Yang Ming	Wu Lin Feng 528, 60 kg 4-man Tournament Semi Final	Tangshan, China	Decision (unanimous)	3	3:00
2021-09-25	Win	(China) Yang Hua	Wu Lin Feng 2021: WLF in Tangshan	Tangshan, China	Decision (unanimous)	3	3:00
2021-05-29	Win	(China) Yang Hua	Wu Lin Feng 2021: World Contender League 4th Stage	Zhengzhou, China	Decision (unanimous)	3	3:00
2021-03-27	Win	(China) Zhang Lanpei	Wu Lin Feng 2021: World Contender League 1st Stage	Zhengzhou, China	Decision (unanimous)	3	3:00
2020-12-22	Win	(China) Li Ning	Wu Lin Feng 2020: Women's 52kg Championship Tournament	Zhengzhou, China	KO		
2020-11-14	Loss	(China) Zhang Lanpei	Wu Lin Feng 2020: China 60kg & 63kg Championship Tournament, Tournament Semifinal	Zhengzhou, China	KO (low kick)	1	
2020-11-14	Win	(China) Zhao Jiangfeng	Wu Lin Feng 2020: China 60kg & 63kg Championship Tournament, Tournament Quarterfinal	Zhengzhou, China	Decision (unanimous)	3	3:00
2020-09-23	Win	(China) Feng Tienhao	Wu Lin Feng 2020: King's Super Cup 5th Group Stage	Zhengzhou, China	Decision (unanimous)	3	3:00
2020-08-03	Win	(China) Zhao Jiangfeng	Wu Lin Feng 2020: King's Super Cup 4th Group Stage	Zhengzhou, China	Decision	3	3:00
2020-07-05	Win	(China) Jin Hu	Wu Lin Feng 2020: King's Super Cup 3rd Group Stage	Zhengzhou, China	Decision	3	3:00
2020-06-13	Loss	(China) Li Yuankun	Wu Lin Feng 2020: King's Super Cup 2nd Group Stage	Zhengzhou, China	Ext.R decision (decision)	4	3:00
2020-05-15	Win	(China) Zhang Lanpei	Wu Lin Feng 2020: King's Super Cup 1st Group Stage	Zhengzhou, China	Decision (unanimous)	3	3:00
2019-12-16	Win	(China) Huang Shuailu	ONE Hero Series December	Beijing, China	Decision (unanimous)	3	3:00
2019-11-18	Loss	(China) Zhang Tao	ONE Hero Series November	Beijing, China	Decision (unanimous)	3	3:00
2019-10-23	Win	(Greece) Spyro Besiri	Wu Lin Feng 2019: WLF in Manila	Manila, Philippines	TKO (hand injury)	3	1:14
2019-08-26	Win	(China) Liu Hai Yang	ONE Hero Series August	Manila, Philippines	Decision (unanimous)	3	3:00
2019-04-27	Win	(Madagascar) Faray Randrianarivo	Wu Lin Feng 2019: WLF -63kg Championship World Tournament	Zhuhai, China	Decision	3	3:00
2018-10-22	Win	(Russia) Sergey	TOPKING Muay Thai Star Tournament	Qingzhou, China	Decision (unanimous)	3	3:00
2018-06-16	Win	(Netherlands) Michel Olensky	Wu Lin Feng 2018: China vs Netherlands & Russia	Shenyang, China	Decision (unanimous)	3	3:00
2018-05-19	Win	(Japan) Yusuke Kojima	Wu Lin Feng 2018: World Championship Yichun	Yichun, Jiangxi, China	KO (knee)	2	
Legend: Win Loss Draw/no contest Notes

== See also ==
- List of male kickboxers
