= 2021 in Wu Lin Feng =

Chinese kickboxing events

Information
- First date: January 23
- Last date: December 16

Events
- Total events: 11

Fights

Chronology
2020 in Wu Lin Feng	2021 in Wu Lin Feng	2022 in Wu Lin Feng

The year 2021 is the 18th year in the history of the Wu Lin Feng, a Chinese kickboxing promotion. The events are broadcast on Henan Television in mainland China and streamed on Douyin and Xigua Video.

== List of events ==
No.	Event	Date	Venue	City
3	Wu Lin Feng 2021: World Contender League 2nd Stage	April 24, 2021	Henan TV Studio 8	Zhengzhou, China
2	Wu Lin Feng 2021: World Contender League 1st Stage	March 27, 2021		China
1	Wu Lin Feng 2021: Global Kung Fu Festival	January 23, 2021	Studio City	(Macau) Macao, China

== Wu Lin Feng 2021: Global Kung Fu Festival - Chinese End of Year Show ==
Wu Lin Feng 2021: Global Kung Fu Festival
- Promotion: Wu Lin Feng
- Date: January 23, 2021
- Venue: Studio City
- City: Macao, China

Wu Lin Feng 2021: Global Kung Fu Festival was a kickboxing event held on January 23, 2021 in Macao, China.

=== Background ===
The event features an 8-man one night tournament, the participants were picked via fans votes among 16 candidates. the fighter who received the most votes with over 80,000 was Tie Yinghua.

=== Results ===
Weight Class				Method	Round	Time	Notes
Kickboxing -67kg	(China) Wang Pengfei	def.	(China) Liu Xiangming	TKO (3 Knockdowns/Punches)	2		WLF -67kg Global Tournament Final
Kickboxing -65kg	(China) Wei Rui	def.	(China) Zheng Junfeng	Decision (Unanimous)	3	3:00	
Kickboxing -67kg	(China) Jin Ying	def.	(China) Zhu Shuai	Decision (Unanimous)	3	3:00	
Kickboxing -75kg	(China) Zhang Kaiyin	def.	(China) Jiao Fukai	Decision	3	3:00	
Kickboxing -67kg	(China) Wang Pengfei	def.	(China) Tie Yinghua	Decision	3	3:00	WLF -67kg Global Tournament Semi Final
Kickboxing -67kg	(China) Liu Xiangming	def.	(China) Jia Aoqi	Decision (Unanimous)	3	3:00	WLF -67kg Global Tournament Semi Final
Kickboxing -78kg	(China) Fu Gaofeng	def.	(China) Zhang Yonkang	KO (High Kick)	3		
Kickboxing -70kg	(China) Ouyang Feng	def.	(China) Liu Lei	KO (High Kick)	3		
Kickboxing -60kg	(China) Zhao Chongyang	def.	(China) Zhang Lanpei	Decision (Unanimous)	3	3:00	
Kickboxing -67kg	(China) Wang Pengfei	def.	(China) Wei Ninghui	Decision (Unanimous)	3	3:00	WLF -67kg Global Tournament Quarter Final
Kickboxing -67kg	(China) Tie Yinghua	def.	(China) Liu Yaning	TKO (2 Knockdowns/Wheel Kick)	2		WLF -67kg Global Tournament Quarter Final
Kickboxing -67kg	(China) Jia Aoqi	def.	(China) Ji Xiang	Decision (Unanimous)	3	3:00	WLF -67kg Global Tournament Quarter Final
Kickboxing -67kg	(China) Liu Xiangming	def.	(China) Meng Guodong	KO (Straight to the body)	2		WLF -67kg Global Tournament Quarter Final
Kickboxing -78kg	(China) Li Hui	def.	(China) Tan Xiaofeng	Decision (Unanimous)	3	3:00	

== Wu Lin Feng 2021: World Contender League 1st Stage ==
Wu Lin Feng 516
- Promotion: Wu Lin Feng
- Date: March 27, 2021
- City: China

Wu Lin Feng 2021: World Contender League 1st Stage is a kickboxing event held on March 27, 2021 in China.

=== Background ===
The event was headlined by a 64kg match between Wei Rui and Liu Wei.

The event will feature four matches each in the 60kg, 63kg and 65 kg Contender Leagues.

=== Results ===
Weight Class				Method	Round	Time	Notes
Kickboxing -64kg	(China) Wei Rui	def.	(China) Liu Wei	Ext.R Decision	4	3:00	
Kickboxing -70kg	(China) Ouyang Feng	def.	(China) Han Wenbao	Decision	3	3:00	
Kickboxing -63kg	(China) Yi Yuxuan	def.	(China) Zhang Jun	Decision	3	3:00	
Kickboxing -63kg	(China) Zhu Shuai	def.	(China) Wei Weiyang	Decision (Unanimous)	3	3:00	63kg WLF World Championship Contender League
Kickboxing Women -60kg	(China) Yang Yang	def.	(China) Guo Chengru	Decision	3	3:00	
Kickboxing -63kg	(China) Jin Ying	def.	(China) Shun Li	Decision	3	3:00	63kg WLF World Championship Contender League
Kickboxing -63kg	(China) Zheng Junfeng	def.	(China) Wang Zhiwei	Ext.R Decision	4	3:00	63kg WLF World Championship Contender League
Kickboxing -75kg	(China) Xu Yuanqing	def.	(China) Cheng Jungfeng	Decision (Unanimous)	3	3:00	
Kickboxing -63kg	(China)	vs.	(China) Wang Jiale				63kg WLF World Championship Contender League
Kickboxing -90kg	(China) Liu Ce	def.	(China) Zhang Caibao	KO (Low kick)	1	2:38	
Kickboxing -65kg	(China) Zhou Yi	vs.	(China) Fu Qingnang				65kg WLF World Championship Contender League
Kickboxing -65kg	(China) Zhao Chuanlin	vs.	(China)				65kg WLF World Championship Contender League
Kickboxing -65kg	(China) Xie Yuhang	vs.	(China) Hu Zheng				65kg WLF World Championship Contender League
Kickboxing -65kg	(China) Meng Gaofeng	def.	(China) Bai Lishuai	Decision (Unanimous)	3	3:00	65kg WLF World Championship Contender League
Kickboxing -60kg	(China) Xue Shenzhen	def.	(China) Lu Baoming	Decision (Unanimous)	3	3:00	
Kickboxing -57kg	(China) Zhang Peimian	def.	(China) Liu Zhipeng	Decision	3	3:00	
Kickboxing -60kg	(China) Yang Ming	def.	(China) Li Yuankun	Decision (Split)	3	3:00	60kg WLF World Championship Contender League
Kickboxing -60kg	(China) Zhao Chongyang	def.	(China) Yang Hua	Decision (Unanimous)	3	3:00	60kg WLF World Championship Contender League
Kickboxing -60kg	(China) Zhao Jiangfeng	def.	(China) Huang Shuailu	Decision (Split)	3	3:00	60kg WLF World Championship Contender League
Kickboxing -60kg	(China) Zhao Boshi	def.	(China) Zhang Lanpei	Decision (Unanimous)	3	3:00	60kg WLF World Championship Contender League
Kickboxing -60kg	(China) Zhao Zhanshi	def.	(China) Qubie Juntie	Decision (Unanimous)	3	3:00	

== Wu Lin Feng 2021: World Contender League 2nd Stage ==
Wu Lin Feng 2021: World Contender League 2nd Stage
- Promotion: Wu Lin Feng
- Date: April 24, 2021
- Venue: Henan TV Studio 8
- City: Zhengzhou, China

Wu Lin Feng 2021: World Contender League 2nd Stage is a kickboxing event held on April 24, 2021 in Zhengzhou, China.

=== Background ===
The event will feature matches each in the 67kg and 70kg World Contender Leagues.

=== Results ===
Weight Class				Method	Round	Time	Notes
Kickboxing -72kg	(China) Han Feilong	def.	(Thailand) Wacharalek	Decision (Unanimous)	3	3:00	
Kickboxing -75kg	(China) Xu Yuanqing	def.	(China) Zhao Yan	Decision (Unanimous)	3	3:00	WLF China 75kg Championship Tournament Final
Kickboxing Women -56kg	(China) Li Mingrui	def.	(China) Zhang Meng	Decision (Unanimous)	3	3:00	56kg WLF China Championship Tournament Final
Kickboxing -67kg	(China) Wang Pengfei	def.	(China) Er Kang	Decision (Unanimous)	3	3:00	67kg WLF World Championship Contender League
Kickboxing -90kg	(China) Liu Ce	def.	(Brazil) Renato Lopes	TKO (Punches)	3	0:58	
Kickboxing -70kg	(China) Chen Yonghui	def.	(China) Xu Liu	Decision (Unanimous)	3	3:00	70kg WLF World Championship Contender League
Kickboxing -75kg	(China) Zhao Yan	def.	(China) Li Hui	KO (Low Kicks)	2		WLF China 75kg Championship Tournament Semi Final
Kickboxing -75kg	(China) Xu Yuanqing	def.	(China) Wu Sihan	Decision (Unanimous)	3	3:00	WLF China 75kg Championship Tournament Semi Final
Kickboxing -83kg	(China) Liu Dacheng	def.	(China) Cao Shuaihang	KO (Punches)	1	0:55	
Kickboxing Women -56kg	(China) Zhang Meng	def.	(China) Han Xin	Ext.R TKO (Doctor Stoppage)	4	0:11	56kg WLF China Championship Tournament Semi Final
Kickboxing Women -56kg	(China) Li Mingrui	def.	(China) Wu Yi	Decision (Unanimous)	3	3:00	56kg WLF China Championship Tournament Semi Final
Kickboxing Women -52kg	(China) Liu Yuer	def.	(China) Shao Mulan	Decision (Unanimous)	3	3:00	
Kickboxing -70kg	(China) Luo Chao	def.	(China) Liu Lei	Decision (Unanimous)	3	3:00	70kg WLF World Championship Contender League
Kickboxing -70kg	(China) Han Wenbao	def.	(China) Qu Hao	Decision (Unanimous)			70kg WLF World Championship Contender League
Kickboxing -70kg	(China) Ouyang Feng	def.	(China) Wu Shijie	TKO (Low kicks)	2		70kg WLF World Championship Contender League
Kickboxing -60kg	(China) Jiduo Yibu	def.	(China) Wang Junyu	Decision (Unanimous)	3	3:00	
Kickboxing -75kg	(China) Zhao Yan	def.	(China) Zhang Chengcheng				WLF China 75kg Championship Tournament Quarter Final
Kickboxing -75kg	(China) Li Hui	def.	(China) Tan Xiaofeng	Decision (Unanimous)	3	3:00	WLF China 75kg Championship Tournament Quarter Final
Kickboxing -75kg	(China) Wu Sihan	def.	(China) Wang Qi	Decision	3	3:00	WLF China 75kg Championship Tournament Quarter Final
Kickboxing -75kg	(China) Xu Yuanqing	def.	(China) Chang Junrong				WLF China 75kg Championship Tournament Quarter Final
Kickboxing -65kg	(China) Jin Jincheng	def.	(China) Lu Jie	KO (Body Punches)	2		

== Wu Lin Feng 2021: World Contender League 3rd Stage ==
Wu Lin Feng 2021: World Contender League 3rd Stage
- Promotion: Wu Lin Feng
- Date: May 22, 2021
- Venue: Henan TV Studio 8
- City: Xin County, China

Wu Lin Feng 2021: World Contender League 3rd Stage is a kickboxing event held on May 22, 2021 in Xin County, China.

=== Results ===
Weight Class				Method	Round	Time	Notes
Kickboxing -69kg	(China) Wang Pengfei	def.	(China) Zhou Jiaqiang	Decision (Unanimous)	3	3:00	
Kickboxing -63kg	(China) Jin Ying	def.	(China) Yuan Pengbin	Decision (Unanimous)	3	3:00	63kg WLF World Championship Contender League
Kickboxing -57kg	(China) Qumuxifu	def.	(China) Liu Zhipeng	Decision	3	3:00	
Kickboxing Women -52kg	(China) Que Yannan	def.	(China) Chun Lei	Decision	3	3:00	
Kickboxing -63kg	(China) Zhu Shuai	def.	(China) Zhang Jun	Decision (Unanimous)	3	3:00	63kg WLF World Championship Contender League
Kickboxing -67kg	(China) Xu Jian	def.	(China) Xu Tongben	KO (Front Kick)	1		
Kickboxing -58kg	(China) Zhao Xiaopeng	def.	(China) Yuan Zhibin	Decision (Unanimous)	3	3:00	
Kickboxing -63kg	(China) Wei Weiyang	def.	(China) Yimireti Tuoheti	Ext.R Decision	4	3:00	63kg WLF World Championship Contender League
Kickboxing -58kg	(China) Wang Quan	def.	(China) Wang Qiang	Decision (Unanimous)	3	3:00	

== Wu Lin Feng 2021: World Contender League 4th Stage ==
Wu Lin Feng 2021: World Contender League 4th Stage
- Promotion: Wu Lin Feng
- Date: May 29, 2021
- Venue: Henan TV Studio 8
- City: Zhengzhou, China

Wu Lin Feng 2021: World Contender League 4th Stage is a kickboxing event held on May 29, 2021 in Zhengzhou, China.

=== Background ===
The event featured matches in the 60, 65 and 67kg Contender Leagues and was headlined by a 65kg match between Liu Xiangming and Thodkui Manas. Zhang Lanpei and Zhang Mengfei both missed weight and entered their respective bouts with a point deduction penalty.

=== Results ===
Weight Class				Method	Round	Time	Notes
Kickboxing -65kg	(China) Liu Xiangming	def.	(Thailand) Thodkui Manas	Decision (Unanimous)	3	3:00	
Kickboxing -67kg	(China) Jia Aoqi	def.	(China) Hu Yafei	Decision (Majority)	3	3:00	67kg WLF World Championship Contender League
Kickboxing -65kg	(China) Liu Yaning	vs.	(China) Wei Ninghui				67kg WLF World Championship Contender League
Kickboxing Women -57kg	(Iran) Elaheh Mansourian	def.	(China) Zhang Meng	Decision (Unanimous)	3	3:00	
Kickboxing -60kg	(China) Zhang Lanpei	def.	(China) Zhao Chongyang	TKO (Punches)	2	2:02	60kg WLF World Championship Contender League
Kickboxing -60kg	(China) Zhao Boshi	def.	(China) Yang Hua	Decision (Unanimous)	3	3:00	60kg WLF World Championship Contender League
Kickboxing -60kg	(China) Xue Shenzhen	def.	(China) Li Yuankun	Decision (Unanimous)	3	3:00	60kg WLF World Championship Contender League
Kickboxing -60kg	(China) Huang Shuailu	def.	(China) Yang Ming	Decision (Unanimous)	3	3:00	60kg WLF World Championship Contender League
Kickboxing -63kg	(China) Wang Jiale	vs.	(China) Aniwat Kachoenram				
Kickboxing -65kg	(China) Zhang Shuai	vs.	(China) Xie Yuhang				65kg WLF World Championship Contender League
Kickboxing -65kg	(China) Zhao Chuanlin	vs.	(China) Pan Jiayun				65kg WLF World Championship Contender League
Kickboxing -65kg	(China) Bai Lishuai	vs.	(China) Fu Qingnan				65kg WLF World Championship Contender League
Kickboxing -65kg	(China) Meng Gaofeng	vs.	(China) Shang Xifeng				65kg WLF World Championship Contender League
Kickboxing -70kg	(China) Liu Yunlong	def.	(China) Zhang Mengfei	Decision (Unanimous)	3	3:00	

== Wu Lin Feng 2021: World Contender League 5th Stage ==
Wu Lin Feng 2021: World Contender League 5th Stage
- Promotion: Wu Lin Feng
- Date: July 3, 2021
- Venue: Henan TV Studio 8
- City: Zhengzhou, China

Wu Ling Feng 2021: 100th Year Anniversary of the Chinese Communitst Party or Wu Lin Feng 520: World Contender League 5th Stage is a kickboxing event held on July 3, 2021 in Zhengzhou, China.

=== Results ===
Weight Class				Method	Round	Time	Notes
Kickboxing -93kg	(China) Feng Rui	def.	(China) Liu Ce	Decision (Unanimous)	3	3:00	
Kickboxing -67kg	(China) Tie Yinghua	def.	(China) Xu Jian	Decision (Unanimous)	3	3:00	67kg WLF World Championship Contender League
Kickboxing -67kg	(China) Wei Ninghui	def.	(China) Zhou Jiaqiang	Decision (Split)	3	3:00	67kg WLF World Championship Contender League
Kickboxing Women -52kg	(China) Liu Yueer	def.	(China) Chun Lei	Decision (Unanimous)	3	3:00	
Kickboxing -67kg	(China) Jia Aoqi	def.	(China) Er Kang	Decision (Unanimous)	3	3:00	67kg WLF World Championship Contender League
Kickboxing -67kg	(China) Wang Pengfei	def.	(China) Hu Yafei	Decision (Unanimous)	3	3:00	67kg WLF World Championship Contender League
Kickboxing -75kg	(China) Xu Yuanqing	def.	(China) Tan Xiaofeng	Decision (Unanimous)	3	3:00	
Kickboxing -62kg	(China) Wang Wenben	def.	(Thailand) Piyanan	Decision (Unanimous)	3	3:00	
Kickboxing -77kg	(China) Wu Sihan	vs.	(China) Zhang Chencheng				
Kickboxing -63kg	(China) Zheng Junfeng	def.	(China) Shun Li	Decision (Unanimous)	3	3:00	63kg WLF World Championship Contender League
Kickboxing -70kg	(China) Han Wenbao	def.	(China) Luo Chao	Decision (Unanimous)	3	3:00	70kg WLF World Championship Contender League
Kickboxing -70kg	(China) Liu Lei	vs.	(China) Qu Hao				70kg WLF World Championship Contender League
Kickboxing -70kg	(China) Xu Liu	vs.	(China) Liu Yunlong				70kg WLF World Championship Contender League
Kickboxing -70kg	(China) Ouyang Feng	def.	(China) Chen Yonhui	Decision (Unanimous)	3	3:00	70kg WLF World Championship Contender League
Kickboxing -70kg	(China) Wu	vs.	(China) Zhang Long				
Kickboxing -67kg	(China) Liu Shenghao	def.	(China) Zhou Haoran	KO (Body Punch)	3		
Kickboxing -65kg	(China) Li Tao	def.	(China) Zhang Shinbo	Decision (Split)	3	3:00	
Kickboxing -60kg	(China) Zhao Zhanshi	def.	(China) Lu Baoming	Decision (Unanimous)	3	3:00	
Kickboxing -58kg	(China) Cho Xaofei	vs.	(China) Wei Zuxin				

== Wu Lin Feng 2021: WLF in Tangshan ==
Wu Lin Feng 2021: WLF in Tangshan
- Promotion: Wu Lin Feng
- Date: September 25, 2021
- City: Tangshan, China

Wu Lin Feng 2021: WLF in Tangshan is a kickboxing event held on September 25, 2021 in Tangshan, China. The event was originally scheduled on July 31, 2021 in Tangshan, China. The event was postponed, due to the floods in the Henan province.

=== Results ===
Weight Class				Method	Round	Time	Notes
Kickboxing -67kg	(China) Tie Yinghua	def.	(China) Wei Ninghui	Decision (Unanimous)	3	3:00	67kg WLF World Championship Contender League
Kickboxing -71kg	(Thailand) Wacharalek	def.	(China) Yang Zhuo	Decision (Unanimous)	3	3:00	
Kickboxing -70kg	(China) Han Wenbao	def.	(China) Liu Lei	Decision (Unanimous)	3	3:00	70kg WLF World Championship Contender League
Kickboxing -98kg	(China) Liu Ce	def.	(Brazil) Renato Lopes	Decision (Unanimous)	3	3:00	
Kickboxing -67kg	(China) Zhou Jiaqiang	def.	(China) Xu Jian	Decision (Unanimous)	3	3:00	67kg WLF World Championship Contender League
Kickboxing Women -56kg	(Iran) Elaheh Mansourian	def.	(China) Wu Yi	TKO	1	1:10	
Kickboxing -75kg	(China) Xu Yuanqing	def.	(China) Zhang Chengcheng	Decision (Unanimous)	3	3:00	
Kickboxing -60kg	(China) Huang Shuailu	def.	(China) Li Yuankun	Decision (Unanimous)	3	3:00	60kg WLF World Championship Contender League
Kickboxing -60kg	(China) Yang Ming	def.	(China) Xue Shenzhen	Decision (Unanimous)	3	3:00	60kg WLF World Championship Contender League
Kickboxing -63kg	(China) Ma Yunkang	def.	(China) Zhao Zhangshi	KO (High Kick)	1	1:25	
Kickboxing -60kg	(China) Zhao Boshi	def.	(China) Yang Hua	Decision (Unanimous)	3	3:00	
Kickboxing -58kg	(China) Wei Ziqin	def.	(China) Qumuxifu	Decision (Unanimous)	3	3:00	

== Wu Lin Feng 2021: World Contender League 6th Stage ==
Wu Lin Feng 2021: World Contender League 6th Stage
- Promotion: Wu Lin Feng
- Date: September 30, 2021
- Venue: Henan TV Studio 8
- City: Zhengzhou, China

Wu Lin Feng 2021: World Contender League 6th Stage or Wu Lin Feng 522 is a kickboxing event held on September 30, 2021 in Zhengzhou, China.

=== Results ===
Weight Class				Method	Round	Time	Notes
Kickboxing -67kg	(China) Jia Aoqi	def.	(China) Wang Pengfei	Decision (Unanimous)	3	3:00	67kg WLF World Championship Contender League
Kickboxing -65kg	(China) Pan Jiayun	def.	(China) Liu Shenghao	Decision (Unanimous)	3	3:00	65kg WLF World Championship Contender League
Kickboxing -65kg	(China) Xie Yuhang	def.	(China) Zhao Chuanlin	Decision (Unanimous)	3	3:00	65kg WLF World Championship Contender League
Kickboxing -65kg	(China) Bai Lishuai	def.	(China) Wang Jiale	Decision (Unanimous)	3	3:00	65kg WLF World Championship Contender League
Kickboxing -65kg	(China) Meng Gaofeng	def.	(China) Kong Dexiang	Decision (Unanimous)	3	3:00	65kg WLF World Championship Contender League
Kickboxing -63kg	(China) Zheng Junfeng	def.	(China) Jin Ying	Decision (Unanimous)	3	3:00	63kg WLF World Championship Contender League
Kickboxing -63kg	(China) Zhu Shuai	def.	(China) Yimireti Tuoheti	Decision (Unanimous)	3	3:00	63kg WLF World Championship Contender League
Kickboxing -63kg	(China) Wei Weiyang	def.	(China) Zhang Jun	KO (Low Kick)	3	1:30	63kg WLF World Championship Contender League
Kickboxing -63kg	(China) Cao Zhiyang	def.	(China) Wang Wanli	Decision (Unanimous)	3	3:00	63kg WLF World Championship Contender League
Kickboxing -63kg	(China) Zhang Jingtao	def.	(China) Chen Xiaofan	TKO	3		
Kickboxing Women -52kg	(China) Li Lishan	def.	(China) Xao Mulan	Decision	3	3:00	Tournament Final
Kickboxing -80kg	(China) Wang Aogang	def.	(China) Liu Dacheng	Decision (Uannimous)	3	3:00	
Kickboxing Women -52kg	(China) Li Lishan	def.	(China) Chun Lei	Decision	3	3:00	Tournament Semi Final
Kickboxing Women -52kg	(China) Xao Mulan	def.	(China) Deng Yeping	Decision	3	3:00	Tournament Semi Final
Kickboxing -70kg	(China) Ouyang Feng	def.	(China) Xu Liu	TKO	1		70kg WLF World Championship Contender League
Kickboxing -70kg	(China) Luo Chao	def.	(China) Qu Hao	Decision (Unanimous)	3	3:00	70kg WLF World Championship Contender League
Kickboxing -70kg	(China) Ren Guotao	def.	(China) Chen Yonhui	Decision	3	3:00	70kg WLF World Championship Contender League
Kickboxing -61.5kg	(Iran) Ali Zafar	def.	(China) Wang Junyu	Decision (Unanimous)	3	3:00	
Kickboxing -58kg	(China) Lan Shanteng	def.	(China) Zhang Yong	Decision	3	3:00	

== Wu Lin Feng 2021: WLF on Haihua Island ==
Wu Lin Feng 2021: WLF on Haihua Island
- Promotion: Wu Lin Feng
- Date: October 30, 2021
- Venue: Henan TV Studio 8
- City: Danzhou, China

Wu Lin Feng 2021: WLF on Haihua Island or Wu Lin Feng 523 is a kickboxing event held on October 30, 2021 in Danzhou, China.

=== Results ===
Weight Class				Method	Round	Time	Notes
Kickboxing -80kg	(China) Yi Long	def.	(Morocco) Ayoub Faiz	KO	1		
Kickboxing -65kg	(China) Wei Rui	def.	(Iran) Moslem Lashani	TKO (Straight Left)	1	2:02	
Kickboxing -58kg	(China) Wang Junguang	def.	(China) Liu Zhipeng	Decision (Unanimous)	3	3:00	
Kickboxing -61kg	(China) Zhao Jiangfeng	vs.	(Iran) Ali Zafar				
Kickboxing -60kg	(China) Zhao Chongyang	def.	(China) Yang Hua	KO (High Kick)	2		60kg WLF World Championship Contender League
Kickboxing Women -58kg	(Iran) Ghaffari	def.	(China) Han Xin	Decision (Unanimous)	3	3:00	
Kickboxing -65kg	(China) Pan Jiayun	vs.	(Thailand) Thodkui Manas	Draw (no decision)	1	9:00	Special rules. 9 minutes fight without a break. Can only win by KO.
Kickboxing -70kg	(China) Ouyang Feng	def.	(China) Luo Chao	Decision (Unanimous)	3	3:00	70kg WLF World Championship Contender League Semi Final
Kickboxing -70kg	(China) Han Wenbao	def.	(China) Ren Guohao	Decision	3	3:00	70kg WLF World Championship Contender League Semi Final
Kickboxing -77kg	(China) Li Hui	vs.	(China) Bo Fufan	Ext.R Decision	4	3:00	
Kickboxing -60kg	(China) Li Yuankun	def.	(China) Yimireti Tuoheti	Decision	3	3:00	
Kickboxing -63kg	(China) Shun Li	def.	(China) Wang Jiale	Ext.R Decision	4	3:00	
Kickboxing -65kg	(China) Er Kang	def.	(China) Liu Shenghao	Decision (Unanimous)	3	3:00	
Kickboxing -71kg	(China) Suai Qi	def.	(China) Li Shiyuan	TKO (Punches)	1		
Kickboxing -70kg	(China) Li Chanban	vs.	(China)				
Kickboxing -60kg	(China) Pan Jing	def.	(China) Su Kexin	Decision	3	3:00	

== Wu Lin Feng 2021: World Contender League 7th Stage ==
Wu Lin Feng 2021: WLF 525
- Promotion: Wu Lin Feng
- Date: November 27, 2021
- Venue: Henan TV Studio 8
- City: Zhengzhou, China

Wu Lin Feng 2021: World Contender League 7th Stage or Wu Lin Feng 525 is a kickboxing event held on November 27, 2021 in Zhengzhou, China.

=== Results ===
Weight Class				Method	Round	Time	Notes
Kickboxing -78kg	(China) Fu Gaofeng	def.	(China) Tan Xiaofeng	Decision	3	3:00	
Kickboxing -62kg	(China) Huang Shuailu	def.	(Thailand) Lerdsila Chumpairtour	Ext.R Decision	4	3:00	
Kickboxing -70kg	(China) Ouyang Feng	def.	(China) Han Wenbao	Decision	3	3:00	WLF World Contender League -70kg Final
Kickboxing -67kg	(China) Jia Aoqi	def.	(China) Wei Ninghui	Decision	3	3:00	WLF World Contender League -67kg Semi Final
Kickboxing -67kg	(China) Wang Pengfei	def.	(China) Zhou Jiaqiang	Decision	3	3:00	WLF World Contender League -67kg Semi Final
Kickboxing -80kg	(China) Bo Fufan	def.	(China) Wang Aogang	Ext.R Decision	4	3:00	
Kickboxing -63kg	(China) Jin Ying	def.	(China) Zhu Shuai	Ext.R Decision (Split)	4	3:00	WLF World Contender League -63kg Semi Final
Kickboxing -65kg	(China) Meng Gaofeng	def.	(China) Zhao Chuanlin	Decision (Unanimous)	3	3:00	WLF World Contender League -65kg Final
Kickboxing -75kg	(China) Chang Juncheng	def.	(China) Waang Keqing	Decision (Unanimous)	3	3:00	
Kickboxing -57.5kg	(China) Qumuxifu	def.	(Iran) Sadegh Hahemi	Decision (Unanimous)	3	3:00	
Kickboxing -75kg	(China) Xu Liu	def.	(Thailand) Sawettapong	Decision (Unanimous)	3	3:00	
Kickboxing -66kg	(China) Yi Yuxuan	def.	(China) Zhang Jinbo	Decision (Unanimous)	3	3:00	
Kickboxing -70kg	(China) Shuai Qi	def.	(China) Ren Guohao	Decision (Unanimous)	3	3:00	

== Wu Lin Feng 2021: WLF 526 ==
Wu Lin Feng 2021: WLF 526
- Promotion: Wu Lin Feng
- Date: December 16, 2021
- Venue: Henan TV Studio 8
- City: Zhengzhou, China

Wu Lin Feng 526 is a kickboxing event held on December 16, 2021 in Zhengzhou, China.

=== Results ===
Weight Class				Method	Round	Time	Notes
Kickboxing -57.5 kg	(China) Wei Ziqin	def.	(China) Lan Shanteng	Decision (Unanimous)	3	3:00	WLF China 8-man Tournament Final. Wins inaugural WLF China 57.5kg title.
Kickboxing -75 kg	(China) Han Feilong	def.	(Thailand) Sawettapong	Decision (Unanimous)	3	3:00	
Kickboxing -63 kg	(China) Zhang Lanpei	def.	(China) Wei Weiyang	Decision (Split)	3	3:00	
Kickboxing -63 kg	(China) Liu Wei	def.	(China) Cao Zhiyang	Decision (Unanimous)	3	3:00	
Kickboxing -67 kg	(China) Hu Zheng	def.	(China) Wu Jianguo	TKO (Doctor stoppage)	2		
Kickboxing -70 kg	(China) Luo Chao	def.	(China) Liu Lei	Decision (Unanimous)	3	3:00	
Kickboxing -65 kg	(China) Zhang Kui	def.	(China) Zhang Tiequ	Decision (Unanimous)	3	3:00	
Kickboxing -57.5 kg	(China) Wei Ziqin	def.	(China) Su Kexin	Decision (Unanimous)	3	3:00	WLF China 8-man Tournament Semi Final
Kickboxing -57.5 kg	(China) Qumu Xifu	def.	(China) Lan Shanteng	Decision	3	3:00	WLF China 8-man Tournament Semi Final
Kickboxing -60 kg	(China) Huang Shuailu	def.	(China) Yang Hua	Decision (Unanimous)	3	3:00	
Kickboxing -57.5 kg	(China) Lan Shanteng	def.	(China) Li Yuankun				WLF China 8-man Tournament Quart Final
Kickboxing -57.5 kg	(China) Qumu Xifu	def.	(China) Ymireti Tuhoeti				WLF China 8-man Tournament Quart Final
Kickboxing -57.5 kg	(China) Wei Ziqin	def.	(China) Liu Zhipeng				WLF China 8-man Tournament Quart Final
Kickboxing -57.5 kg	(China) Su Kexin	def.	(China) Zhang Yong				WLF China 8-man Tournament Quart Final
Kickboxing -60 kg	(China) Wu Di	def.	(China) Dai Huixian	Decision	3	3:00	

== See also ==
- 2021 in Glory
- 2021 in K-1
- 2021 in ONE Championship
- 2021 in Romanian kickboxing
