= Deng Zeqi =

Chinese Muay Thai kickboxer

- Born: October 15, 1991 (age 35); Xinyu, Jiangxi, China
- Native name: 邓泽奇
- Nationality: Chinese
- Height: 1.71 m (5 ft 7 1/2 in)
- Weight: 63.0 kg (138.9 lb; 9.92 st)
- Division: Bantamweight; Featherweight
- Style: Muay Thai, kickboxing
- Stance: Orthodox
- Fighting out of: Guangzhou, China
- Team: Da Dong Xiang Fight Club (present)
- Years active: 2011–present

Kickboxing record
- Total: 49
- Wins: 39
- By knockout: 13
- Losses: 10
- Draws: 0

Mixed martial arts record
- Total: 1
- Wins: 0
- Losses: 1
- By submission: 1

Deng Zeqi (Chinese: 邓泽奇, born October 15, 1991) is a Chinese Muay Thai kickboxer who fights out of Da Dong Xiang fight club. He holds notable victories over Lerdsila Chumpairtour, Rungravee Sasiprapa, Sergio Wielzen, and Chan Hyung Lee. Deng has fought under the Wu Lin Feng, Glory of Heroes, and Krush banner.

== Career ==
On November 14, 2012 in Las Vegas, Nevada WCK Muay Thai "Wulinfeng Spectacular", Deng Zeqi defeated Lerdsila Chumpairtour to win the Lightweight WCK Muaythai World Championship -60 kg belt via split decision.

On December 5, 2015 in Zhengzhou, Henan WLF World Championship 2015 -63 kg Tournament, Finals, Deng Zeqi challenged Wei Rui for the WLF World Championship 2015 –63 kg belt after defeating Rungravee Sasiprapa by knockout in the semi-finals of the competition. The fight was declared a draw which led to the fight going for an extra round where he was knocked out by Wei Rui by TKO via punches.

On July 7, 2018 in Guangdong, China Glory of Heroes 32: Huizhou - GOH 63 kg Championship Tournament, Finals, Deng Zeqi challenged Wei Rui in a rematch, this time for GOH 63 kg Championship belt but had once again lost by knockout.

== Championships and awards ==
Muay Thai

- WCK Muaythai
  - 2012 WCK Muaythai Lightweight World Champion -60 kg
- Amateur Muay Thai
  - 2011 National Muay Thai Champion -60 kg

Kickboxing

- Wu Lin Feng
  - 2015 WLF World Championship Champions -63 kg runner-up
- Glory of Heroes
  - 2018 GOH Junior Featherweight (-63kg) World Champion Tournament runner-up
- Hong Kong Fight Night
  - 2011 Hong Kong Fight Night King's Gold Belt

== Kickboxing record ==
Kickboxing record
39 wins (13 (T)KOs), 11 losses
Date	Result	Opponent	Event	Location	Method	Round	Time
2024-03-30	Win	(Russia) Sergei Lutchenko	Glory of Heroes 53	Guangzhou, China	KO (punches)	1	1:53
2023-09-29	Win	(Thailand) Susawat	Glory of Heroes 48	Aral, Xinjiang, China	Decision	3	3:00
2020-12-26	Loss	(Thailand) Superjack (苏帕杰)	Rise of Heroes	China	Ext.R TKO (leg injury)	3	3:00
2020-01-11	Win	(Thailand) Kachoenram Aniwat	Glory of Heroes 46	Wenzhou, China	Decision	3	3:00
2019-12-28	Win	(Belarus) Sergei	Glory of Heroes 44	Shenzhen, China	Decision	3	3:00
2019-06-22	Win	(Russia) Victor Mikhailov	Glory of Heroes 39	Xinyi, China	TKO (punches)		
2019-05-04	Win	(Iran) Hafiz Karimi	Fight Time	Xinyi, China	TKO	2	
2018-09-15	Win	(Brazil) Italo Freitas	Glory of Heroes 34: Tongling	Anhui, China	TKO (punches)	2	
2018-07-28	Win	(Madagascar) Elfazar Fazaraly	Glory of Heroes 33: Shanghai	Shanghai, China	Decision (unanimous)	3	3:00
2018-07-07	Loss	(China) Wei Rui	Glory of Heroes 32: Huizhou - GOH 63 kg Championship Tournament, Finals	Guangdong, China	KO (left knee to the body)	2	1:58
For the GOH Junior Featherweight (-63kg) World Champion.
2018-01-27	Win	(Ukraine) Melnyk Vladyslav	Glory of Heroes: Qingdao	Qingdao, China	Decision (unanimous)	3	3:00
2018-01-06	Win	(Romania) Cristian Spetcu	Glory of Heroes: Wudang Mountain	Hubei, China	Ext. R Decision	4	3:00
2017-11-18	Win	(Switzerland) Hiwa Attari	Glory of Heroes: China VS Switzerland	Martigny, Switzerland	Decision (unanimous)	3	3:00
2017-07-16	Loss	(Japan) Rukiya Anpo	Krush.77	Tokyo, Japan	KO (flying knee)	1	2:53
2017-03-04	Win	(Brazil) Hector Santiago	Glory of Heroes 7	Sao Paulo, Brazil	TKO (ref. stoppage/punches)	3	
2017-01-14	Win	(Greece) Stavros Exakoustidis	Glory of Heroes 6	Jiyuan, China	TKO (right hook)	2	0:10
2016-10-15	Win	(Spain) Cristian Miguel Llobregat	Rise of Heroes 2	Zhangshu, China	TKO	1	
2016-08-06	Loss	(Greece) Stavros Exakoustidis	Glory of Heroes 4	Changzhi, China	TKO	2	
2016-07-02	Win	(South Korea) Chan Hyung Lee	Glory of Heroes 3	China	Decision (unanimous)	3	3:00
2016-05-07	Win	(Belarus) Artur Makouski	Glory of Heroes 2	Shenzhen, China	Decision (unanimous)	3	3:00
2016-04-02	Win	(Colombia) Joan Manuel Lique Canaveral	Glory of Heroes 1	Shenzhen, China	KO (left hook)	1	
2016-01-23	Loss	(Thailand) Jomthong Chuwattana	Wu Lin Feng	Shanghai, China	KO (left cross)	1	
2015-12-05	Loss	(China) Wei Rui	WLF World Championship 2015 -63 kg Tournament, Finals	Zhengzhou, China	TKO (punches)	4	
For the WLF World Championship Champions -63 kg.
2015-12-05	Win	(Thailand) Rungravee Sasiprapa	Wu Lin Feng -63 kg tournament semifinal	China	KO (right hook)	1	3:00
2015-11-13	Win	(Thailand) Lerdsila Chumpairtour	Wu Lin Feng & WCK Muaythai: China vs USA	Las Vegas, USA	Decision	3	3:00
2015-11-07	Win	(China) Zhao Yongxiang	Wu Lin Feng 2015 –63 kg World Tournament, Quarter Final	Anshan, China	Decision	3	3:00
2015-11-07	Win	(Moldova) Maxim Railean	Wu Lin Feng 2015 –63 kg World Tournament, First Round	Anshan, China	TKO	3	
2015-07-04	Win	(Spain) Javier Hernandez	Wu Lin Feng	China	Decision (unanimous)	3	3:00
2015-04-04	Win	(Suriname) Sergio Wielzen	Wu Lin Feng	China	TKO (doctor stoppage)	2	1:38
2015-01-31	Win	(Ukraine) Igor Liubchenko	Wu Lin Feng	China	TKO (left hook)		
2014-11-01	Win	(United States) TJ Arcangel	Wu Lin Feng vs WCK	Las Vegas, Nevada	Decision (unanimous)	3	3:00
2014-09-26	Win	(Thailand) Salika	WBK 1 - Ningbo	Ningbo, China	Decision (unanimous)	3	3:00
2014-06-06	Win	(Argentina) Nicolas Vega	Wu Lin Feng	Wanzhou District, China			
2014-01-25	Loss	(Thailand) Lerdsila Chumpairtour	Kunlun Fight 1	Pattaya, Thailand	Decision (unanimous)	3	3:00
2013-12-06	Loss	(Thailand) Songchai	Wu Lin Feng	Luoyang, China	KO		
2013-11-02	Loss	(Thailand) Lerdsila Chumpairtour	WCK Muay Thai vs. Wulinfeng 2013	Las Vegas, Nevada	Decision (unanimous)	5	3:00
For the WLF Muaythai Lightweight World title.
2013-10-20	Win	(Italy) Claudio Amoruso		China			
2013-08-30	Win	(New Zealand) Jack	Wu Lin Feng	New Zealand			
2013-08-10	Loss	(Thailand) Jomthong Chuwattana	Max Muay Thai 3	Zhengzhou, China	KO (knee)	1	
2013-06-30	Win	(Thailand) Lak		China	Decision	5	3:00
2013-05-03	Win	(Thailand) Phaophuri	WCK MuayThai World Championship	Sichuan, China	KO	3	
Defends WCK Muay Thai Lightweight World Title -60kg.
2013-03-23	Win	(China)	Wu Lin Feng	Henan Province, China	Decision	3	3:00
2013-02-02	Win	(Korea) Choi Gi Hyuk	K-1 Korea MAX 2013	Seoul, South Korea	Decision (unanimous)	3	3:00
2012-11-14	Win	(Thailand) Lerdsila Chumpairtour	WCK Muay Thai "Wulinfeng Spectacular"	Las Vegas, Nevada	Decision (split)	5	3:00
Wins the WCK Muaythai Lightweight World Title -60 kg.
2012-05-04	Loss	(China) Xie Lei	Wu Lin Feng	Zhengzhou, China	Decision (unanimous)	3	3:00
2011-08	Win	(Thailand)	Libogen Fight Night	Hong Kong	KO (knee)		
Legend: Win Loss Draw/no contest Notes

== Mixed martial arts record ==
Professional record breakdown
1 match	0 wins	1 loss
By knockout	0	0
By submission	0	1
By decision	0	0

Res.	Record	Opponent	Method	Event	Date	Round	Time	Location	Notes
Loss	0–1	Alexander Danilov	Submission (rear naked choke)	Glory of Heroes 36: Meishan	October 20, 2018	1	2:47	Sichuan, China	
