= Xie Lei =

Chinese Sanshou kickboxer

- Born: Xie Chuang; August 22, 1992 (age 34); Fuyang, Anhui, China
- Native name: 谢雷
- Other names: "War Cop"
- Nationality: China
- Height: 1.74 m (5 ft 8 1/2 in)
- Weight: 67.0 kg (147.7 lb; 10.55 st)
- Division: Lightweight
- Style: Sanda, Kickboxing
- Stance: Orthodox
- Fighting out of: Liaoning, China
- Team: Liaoning Innovation Fighting Club
- Trainer: Zhang Tao

Kickboxing record
- Total: 80
- Wins: 63
- By knockout: 4
- Losses: 16
- Draws: 1

For the Chinese painter, see Xie Lei (artist).

Xei Lei (Chinese: 谢雷, born August 22, 1992) is a Chinese lightweight Sanda kickboxer who has fought in Wu Lin Feng, K-1, C1-K, Hero Legends, Glory Kickboxing and WCK Muaythai.

== Career ==
March 9, 2013 in Malaysia Wu Lin Feng - Malaysia, Final, Xie Lei defeated Tie Yinghua to win the C1-K World Championship and WLF 4-man Asian tournament by decision.

February 3, 2013 in Xichang, China WCK Muaythai C3 King of Fighting Tournament Final, Xie Lei defeated Liu Xiangming to win the WCK Muaythai Lightweight International Title -60 kg by decision.

== Championships and awards ==
Kickboxing

- C1-K
  - 2013 C1-K World Championship
- Wu Lin Feng
  - 2013 WLF 4-man Asian tournament Winner

Muay Thai

- WCK Muaythai
  - 2013 WCK Muaythai Lightweight International Champion -60 kg

Sanda

- Amateur Sanda
  - 2008 Liaoning Provincial Sanda Championship (gold) -70 kg
  - 2009 Liaoning Provincial Sanda Championship (gold) -70 kg
  - 2010 Liaoning Provincial Sanda Championship (gold) -70 kg
  - 2011 National Sports College Wushu Sanda Championship (bronze) -70 kg

== Kickboxing record ==
Kickboxing record
63 Wins ( (T)KO's), 18 Losses, 1 Draw
Date	Result	Opponent	Event	Location	Method	Round	Time
2019-11-30	Win	(Japan) Yuya Yamato	Wu Lin Feng 2019: WLF -67kg World Cup 2019-2020 6th Group Stage	Bangkok, Thailand	Decision (Unanimous)	3	3:00
2019-10-26	Win	(China) Lu Jianbo	Wu Lin Feng 2019: WLF -67kg World Cup 2019-2020 5th Group Stage	Bangkok, Thailand	Decision (Unanimous)	3	3:00
2019-09-06	Win	(Iran) Mahdi Lali	Wu Lin Feng 2019: WLF at Lumpinee - China vs Thailand	Bangkok, Thailand	Decision	3	3:00
2019-06-29	Loss	(Thailand) Petchtanong Banchamek	Wu Lin Feng 2019: WLF -67kg World Cup 2019-2020 1st Group Stage	Zhengzhou, China	Decision	3	3:00
2019-05-25	Win	(Canada) Warwick Fulke	Wu Lin Feng 2019: WLF China vs Canada	Zhengzhou, China	Decision	3	3:00
2018-11-03	Loss	(Thailand) Petchtanong Banchamek	Wu Lin Feng 2018: WLF -67kg World Cup 2018-2019 5th Round	China	Decision (Unanimous)	3	3:00
2018-09-01	Win	(China) Zhang Chunyu	Wu Lin Feng 2018: WLF -67kg World Cup 2018-2019 3rd Round	Zhengzhou, China	Decision	3	3:00
2018-07-07	Loss	(China) Lu Jun	Wu Lin Feng 2018: WLF -67kg World Cup 2018-2019 1st Round	Zhengzhou, China	Decision	3	3:00
2018-06-02	Loss	(Spain) David Mejia (kickboxer)	Wu Lin Feng 2018: Yi Long VS Saiyok	Chongqing, China	Ext.R Decision	4	3:00
2018-03-03	Loss	(Morocco) Ilias Bulaid	Wu Lin Feng 2018: World Championship Tianjin -67 kg Contender Tournament Semi Final	Tianjin, China	Decision (Unanimous)	3	3:00
2018-02-03	Loss	(Thailand) Singdam Kiatmuu9	Wu Lin Feng 2018: World Championship in Shenzhen	Shenzhen, China	Extra Round Decision (Unanimous)	4	3:00
2017-12-02	Win	(Canada) Maurice Pompey	Wu Lin Feng 2017: China VS Canada	Zhengzhou, China	Decision (Unanimous)	3	3:00
2017-10-14	Loss	(Thailand) Petpanomrung Kiatmuu9	Glory 46: China	Guangzhou, China	Decision (Unanimous)	3	3:00
2017-07-01	Loss	(Spain) Erik Garcia	Wu Lin Feng 2017: China VS Spain	Zhengzhou, China	Decision (Unanimous)	3	3:00
2017-06-03	Win	(Thailand) Puangpornkao Por.Burapha	Wu Lin Feng 2017: China VS Japan	Changsha, China			
2017-05-06	Win	(Netherlands) Lennart Blijd	Wu Lin Feng 2017: -63kg World Tournament	Zhengzhou, China			
2017-04-15	Win	(Thailand) Kongnakonban Sor.KitRungRoj	Wu Lin Feng 2017: Thailand VS China	Bangkok, Thailand			
2017-03-04	Win	(Thailand) Iquezang Kor.Rungthanakeat	Wu Lin Feng 2017: Kung Fu VS Muay Tha	Zhengzhou, China	Decision	3	3:00
2017-01-14	Win	(Japan) Yuta Kubo	2016 World Kickboxing Championship	Zhengzhou, China	Decision (unanimous)	3	3:00
2016-12-03	Loss	(Morocco) Ilias Bulaid	Wu Lin Feng 2016: WLF x Krush - China vs Japan	Zhengzhou, China	Decision (Unanimous)	3	3:00
2016-11-11	Win	(Armenia) Artur	Liaoyang International Fighting Series	China			
2016-10-14	Win	(United States) William Wayne	Wu Lin Feng 2016: WLF x KF1	Hong Kong			
2016-08-27		(Australia) Nathan Robson	Wu Lin Feng 2016: China vs Australia	Sydney, Australia			
2016-08-04	Win	(Morocco) Walid Hamid	Wu Lin Feng 2016: WFL x Fight League - China vs Morocco	Tangier, Morocco	KO		
2016-07-15	Win	(New Zealand) Frans Sanchez	Wu Lin Feng 2016: China vs New Zealand	China			
2016-06-17	Win	(Germany) Denis Wosik	Wu Lin Feng: China vs Germany	Zhengzhou, China	Decision (Split)	3	3:00
2016-06-04	Win	(Japan) Takehiko Saito	Wu Lin Feng vs Krush	China	Decision	3	3:00
2016-04-10	Loss	(Greece) Dyonisis Gkikas	WLF x GODS OF WAR 8 - Greece VS China	Athens, Greece	Decision (Split)	3	3:00
2016-03-05	Win	(Italy) Hamza Imane	Wu Lin Feng	Zhengzhou, China	Decision	3	3:00
2016-01-23	Loss	(Belarus) Andrei Kulebin	Wu Lin Feng Kickboxing Championship in Shanghai 8 Man Tournament, Semi Finals	Shanghai, China	Decision (unanimous)	3	3:00
2016-01-23	Win	(Japan) UMA	Wu Lin Feng Kickboxing Championship in Shanghai 8 Man Tournament, Quarter Finals	Shanghai, China	Decision (unanimous)	3	3:00
2015-12-05	Win	(Netherlands) Nouredinne Kasrioui	Wu Lin Feng	Zhengzhou, China	Decision	3	3:00
2015-08-22	Loss	(Thailand) Jomthong Chuwattana	Wu Lin Feng	Xiamen, China	Decision	3	3:00
2015-08-08	Win	(Thailand) Ah K	Zenhua Hero	Chongqing, China	Decision	3	3:00
2015-06-28	Win	(Spain) Alan	Silk Road Hero	Urumqi, China			
2015-05-02	Win	(Australia) Hussein Al Mansouri	Wu Lin Feng	Xinyang, China	Decision (Split)	3	3:00
2015-05-02	Loss	(China) Xu Jifu	Wu Lin Feng Xinyang Station	Xinyang, China	Decision (Unanimous)	3	3:00
2015-01-03	Win	(Malaysia) Munell	Jiangsu Nanjing V8	China			
2014-12-05	Win	(Thailand) Mahasan Poptheeratham	King's Cup	Thailand	Decision	3	3:00
2014-10-11	Win	(Japan) Koji Yoshimoto	2013-2014 K-1 Word Max Finals	Pattaya, Thailand	Decision (Unanimous)	3	3:00
2014-05-10	Loss	(Germany) Kevin Burmester	Day of Destruction 8	Hamburg, Germany	Decision	3	3:00
2013-12-28	Win	(Philippines) Pasol	K1 World Max Quarter Final	Foshan, China	Decision	3	3:00
2013-09-18	Win	(Germany)	Wu Lin Feng	Linquan County, China			
2013-08-24	Win	(United Kingdom)	Wu Lin Feng	Huabei, China			
2013-08-16	Loss	(Thailand) Chuchai	Wu Lin Feng	Hami, China	Decision	3	3:00
2013-06-06	Win	(Turkey) Jon	Wu Lin Feng	Dubai, United Arab Emirates	Decision	3	3:00
2013-03-15	Win	(Slovenia) Samo Petje	K-1 WORLD GP 2012 Final Super Battle	Croatia	Decision	3	3:00
2013-03-09	Win	(China) Tie Yinghua	Wu Lin Feng - Malaysia C1-K World Championship Final	Malaysia	Decision	3	3:00
Wins the C1-K World Championship and WLF 4-man Asian tournament.
2013-03-09	Win	(South Korea) Steve Ham	Wu Lin Feng - Malaysia C1-K World Championship Semi Finals	Malaysia	Decision	3	3:00
2013-02-03	Win	(China) Liu Xiangming	WCK Muaythai C3 King of Fighting Tournament Final	Xichang, China	Decision	3	3:00
Wins the WCK Muaythai Lightweight International Title -60 kg.
2012-12-01	Win	(Thailand) Dekbungjong Fairtex	The Legend of Heroes-Heroes First Challenge Opening Match	Beijing, China	KO (Punch)	1	2:50
2012-11-11	Loss	(United States) Raul Rodriguez	Wu Lin Feng-Battle of Las Vegas IV	Las Vegas	Decision (Unanimous)	3	3:00
2012-09-25	Win	(Thailand) Phayas		Hefei, China			
2012-08-24	Win	(New Zealand) Brandon Watty	Wu Lin Feng: China vs New Zealand	Auckland, New Zealand			
2012-08-08	Win	(Japan) Akio Kashima	Tang Du Lun Sword	Bozhou, China			
2012-06-22	Win	(China) Zhao Kun	Wu Lin Feng	Zhengzhou, China	Decision (Unanimous)	3	3:00
2012-05-04	Win	(China) Deng Zeqi	Wu Lin Feng	Zhengzhou, China	Decision (Unanimous)	3	3:00
2012-04-13	Win	(Japan) Masato Shirai	Wu Lin Feng: China vs Japan	Zhengzhou, China			
2012-01-14	Loss	(Thailand) Mike	Wu Lin Feng	Zhengzhou, China	Decision	3	3:00
2011-12-11	Win	(Thailand) Tisahami	Wu Lin Feng China vs Thailand	Kaifeng, China			
2011-11-06	Win	(Thailand) Anhuang Rangrong	Wu Lin Feng	Bozhou, China			
2011-09-24	Draw	(Malaysia) Eddie	Wu Lin Feng-Battle of Malaysia	Kuala Lumpur, Malaysia	Ex.R Decision	4	3:00
2011-08-20	Win	(Japan) Keita Yamaguchi	Wu Lin Feng	Zhengzhou, China	Decision (Unanimous)	3	3:00
2011-07-30	Win	(China) Ynag Hefu	Wu Lin Feng	Dengfeng, China	Decision (Unanimous)	3	3:00
2011-07-16	Win	(China) Liu Xiangming	Wu Lin Feng	Zhengzhou, China	Decision (Unanimous)	3	3:00
2011-06-18	Win	(China) Lin Shuai	Wu Lin Feng	Zhengzhou, China	Decision (Unanimous)	3	3:00
2011-04-02	Loss	(China) Tie Yinghua	Wu Lin Feng	Zhengzhou, China	Decision	3	3:00
2011-03-19	Win	(China) Yang Haibo	Wu Lin Feng	Zhengzhou, China	Decision (Unanimous)	3	3:00
2011-02-26	Win	(China) Lin Shuai	Wu Lin Feng	Zhengzhou, China	KO (High Kick)	3	0:08
2011-01-01	Loss	(China) Hong Guang	Wu Lin Feng	Zhengzhou, China	Decision	3	3:00
Legend: Win Loss Draw/No contest Notes

== Amateur Muay Thai record ==
Amateur Muay Thai record
Date	Result	Opponent	Event	Location	Method	Round	Time
2012-06-22	Loss	(China) Qiu Jianliang	National Muaythai Competition 2012 & World Kungfu GF League Tryout, Quarter Finals -71 kg	Jingmen, China	Decision (Unanimous)	4	2:00
Legend: Win Loss Draw/No contest Notes
