= David Mejia (kickboxer) =

Spanish-Colombian kickboxer (born 1995)

- Born: Juan David Londoño Mejía; October 10, 1995 (age 31); Medellin, Colombia
- Nationality: Colombian; Spanish
- Height: 1.74 m (5 ft 8 1/2 in)
- Weight: 65 kg (143 lb; 10.2 st)
- Style: Kickboxing
- Stance: Orthodox
- Fighting out of: Tenerife, Spain; London, England
- Team: Fight Club Moi Rui & Susi Team; James Toomey; Boxing Club Javier Romero
- Trainer: Javier Romero

Kickboxing record
- Total: 65
- Wins: 46
- By knockout: 10
- Losses: 18
- Draws: 1

David Mejía is a Colombian-born Spanish kickboxer. He is a two time ISKA World Champion.

As of July 2023 he was the #1 ranked -67.5 kg kickboxer in the world by Combat Press and #7 according to Beyond Kickboxing.

== Career ==
On September 6, 2014, Mejia faced Adrian Maxim at the Fight Dreams event in Albacete Spain. He won the fight by decision.

On March 21, 2015, Mejia travelled to France to face Kichima Yattabare for the vacant ISKA Freestyle World title. He won the fight by unanimous decision after scoring a knockdown in the second round.

On July 11, 2015, Mejia made the first defense of his ISKA Freestyle World title against Dmitrii Grafov in Moscow Russia. He won the fight by majority decision.

On September 6, 2015, Mejia defeted Carlos Correira by decision in the main event of the Fight Dreams 3 event in Albacete, Spain.

On October 10, 2015, Mejia faced reigning Enfusion 67 kg champion Ilias Bulaid in a non title fight at Enfusion Live 32. He lost the fight by decision.

Mejia was scheduled to face Cédrick Peynaud for the vacant ISKA K-1 World Light-welterweight title in Paris, France, on January 30, 2016. He lost the fight by decision.

Mejia took part in the 2016 year long Tatneft Cup in Kazan, Russia. In the first round happening on May 20, 2016, Mejia defeated Sergey Kosykh by decision. In the 1/8 finals on July 22, 2016, Mejia lost to Ilya Sokolov by decision.

Mejia faced Eddy Nait Slimani at ACB KB 9: Showdown in Paris. He lost the fight by decision.

On March 10, 2018, Mejia entered a 4-man tournament at the Fight Stadium 3 event in France. In the semifinals he lost by decision to Aiman Al Radhi.

Mejia faced Hasan Toy at Wu Lin Feng 2018: WLF -67kg World Cup 2018-2019 2nd Round on August 4, 2018. He lost the fight by decision.

Mejia faced Masaaki Noiri at K-1 World GP 2020: K’Festa 3 on March 22, 2020. He lost the fight by unanimous decision.

Mejia challenged Petpanomrung Kiatmuu9 for his Glory Featherweight title at Glory 89 on 7 October 2023. He lost the fight by split decision.

Mejia faced Jia Aoqi in a -69 kg catchweight bout at Wu Lin Feng 539 on June 24, 2023. He won the fight by decision.

Mejia rematched Jia Aoqi for the vacant Wu Lin Feng World -67 kg title at Wu Lin Feng 2024: 12th Global Kung Fu Festival on January 27, 2024. He lost the fight by unanimous decision.

== Titles and accomplishments ==
- Kombat League
  - 2012 Kombat League K-1 Pro-Am Spain -64 kg Champion
- World Fight Sports and Martial Arts Council
  - 2014 WFMC Spain K-1 -67 kg Champion
- International Sport Karate Association
  - 2015 ISKA Low Kick World Welterweight (-67 kg) Champion
    - One successful title defense
  - 2025 ISKA K-1 World Welterweight (-67 kg) Champion
- Kickboxing Grand Prix
  - 2022 KGP World 63.5 kg Champion

== Fight record ==
Kickboxing Record
46 Wins (10 (T)KO's), 18 Losses, 1 Draw
Date	Result	Opponent	Event	Location	Method	Round	Time
2026-02-28	Loss	(United Kingdom) Mo Abdurahman	T7 Fight Promotions 6	Poole, England	Decision (Unanimous)	5	3:00
For the vacant T7 K-1 World 67kg title.
2025-09-27	Win	(Spain) Abdellah Filali	Fight 2 One X	Tenerife, Spain	Decision (Unanimous)	3	3:00
2025-05-30	Win	(Ukraine) Andrei Ilich	Fight 2 One #9	Tenerife, Spain	TKO (Corner stoppage)	3	
2025-04-26	Win	(Belgium) Jitser Bronselaer	Superfight Ninove 10	Ninove, Belgium	Decision (Unanimous)	5	3:00
Wins the vacant ISKA K-1 World Welterweight (67kg) title.
2025-02-08	Win	(Colombia) Nicolas Sanabria	Fight 2 One #8	Tenerife, Spain	TKO (Corner stoppage)	3	2:36
2024-10-19	Win	(Spain) Abdo Chahidi	Fight 2 One #7	Tenerife, Spain	Decision (Unanimous)	3	3:00
2024-04-27	Loss	(France) Bobo Sacko	Glory 91	Paris, France	KO (Right hook)	1	0:55
2024-01-27	Loss	(China) Jia Aoqi	Wu Lin Feng 2024: 12th Global Kung Fu Festival	Tangshan, China	Decision	5	3:00
For the vacant Wu Lin Feng World -67kg title.
2023-10-07	Loss	(Thailand) Petpanomrung Kiatmuu9	Glory 89	Burgas, Bulgaria	Decision (Split)	5	3:00
For the Glory Featherweight Championship.
2023-06-24	Win	(China) Jia Aoqi	Wu Lin Feng 539	Tangshan, China	Decision	3	3:00
2022-11-20	Win	(Germany) Dennis Haddad	Combat Fight Series 10	London, England	TKO (retirement)	1	3:00
2022-04-03	Win	(Slovakia) Lukas Mandinec	Kickboxing Grand Prix	London, England	KO (Flying knee)	2	2:41
Wins the KGP World -63.5kg title.
2021-11-06	Win	(United Kingdom) Andy Turland	Combat Fight Series 6	London, England	Decision (Unanimous)	3	3:00
2020-03-22	Loss	(Japan) Masaaki Noiri	K-1 World GP 2020: K’Festa 3	Saitama, Japan	Decision (Unanimous)	3	3:00
2020-02-08	Draw	(Spain) Mikel Sortino	K-1 SLAM	Bilbao, Spain	Decision	3	3:00
2019-11-30	Loss	(Thailand) Tawanchai PK Saenchai	Wu Lin Feng 2019: WLF -67kg World Cup 2019-2020 6th Group Stage	Zhengzhou, China	Ext.R Decision (Split)	4	3:00
2019-09-28	Win	(China) Zhang Wensheng	Wu Lin Feng 2019: WLF -67kg World Cup 2019-2020 4th Group Stage	Zhengzhou, China	TKO (Doctor Stoppage)	2	0:30
2019-08-24	Win	(Norway) Simón Santana	FEA World GP Odessa	Odesa, Ukraine	Decision (Unanimous)	3	3:00
2019-07-27	Win	(China) Li Xing	Wu Lin Feng 2019: WLF -67kg World Cup 2019-2020 2nd Group Stage	Zhengzhou, China	Decision (Unanimous)	3	3:00
2019-04-27	Win	(Spain) Khyzer Hayat	Fight Dreams 6	Albacete, Spain	Decision	5	3:00
Defends the Fight Dreams -67kg title.
2019-01-19	Win	(China) Ji Xiang	Wu Lin Feng 2019: WLF World Cup Final	Haikou, China	Decision	3	3:00
2018-12-01	Win	(China) Liu Yaning	Wu Lin Feng 2018: WLF -67kg World Cup 2018-2019 6th Round	Zhengzhou, China	Decision	3	3:00
2018-10-06	Loss	(Portugal) Diego Freitas	Wu Lin Feng 2018: WLF -67kg World Cup 2018-2019 4th Round	Shangqiu, China	Ext.R Decision	4	3:00
2018-09-06	Win	(Spain) Julian Arias	Fight Dreams 5	Albacete, Spain			
2018-08-04	Loss	(Turkey) Hasan Toy	Wu Lin Feng 2018: WLF -67kg World Cup 2018-2019 2nd Round	Zhengzhou, China	Decision (Unanimous)	3	3:00
2018-06-02	Win	(China) Xie Lei	Wu Lin Feng 2018: Yi Long VS Saiyok	Chongqing, China	Ext.R Decision	4	3:00
2018-03-10	Loss	(France) Aiman Al Radhi	Fight Stadium 3, Semifinals	Tergnier, France	Decision (Unanimous)	3	3:00
2018-02-03	Win	(Armenia) Razmik Ghulinyan	K1 SLAM	Bilbao, Spain	Decision (Unanimous)	3	3:00
2017-11-12	Loss	(China) Yang Zhuo	Kunlun Fight 67 -66 kg World Championship, Semi Finals	Sanya, China	Decision (Unanimous)	3	3:00
2017-11-12	Win	(China) Sun Zhixiang	Kunlun Fight 67 -66 kg World Championship, Quarter Finals	Sanya, China	KO (High Knee)		
2017-09-03	Win	(Thailand) Mac Rakkong	Fight Dreams 4	Albacete, Spain	KO		
Wins the inaugural Fight Dreams -67kg title.
2017-08-27	Win	(France) Mohamed Galaoui	Kunlun Fight 65	Qingdao, China	Decision (Unanimous)	3	3:00
2017-03-25	Loss	(France) Eddy Nait Slimani	ACB KB 9: Showdown in Paris	Paris, France	Decision (Unanimous)	3	3:00
2016-10-16	Win	(Morocco) Zakaria Tijarti	ACB KB 8: Only The Braves	Hoofddorp, Netherlands	Decision (Unanimous)	3	3:00
2016-09-03	Win	(Morocco) Younes Cheriff	Fight Dreams 3	Spain			
2016-07-22	Loss	(Russia) Ilya Sokolov	Tatneft Cup 2016 - Quarter Finals	Kazan, Russia	Ext.R Decision	4	3:00
2016-07-08	Win	(Portugal) Marcos Santos	Bunkai Fight Night	Ciudad Real, Spain	Decision (Unanimous)	3	3:00
2016-05-20	Win	(Russia) Sergey Kosykh	Tatneft Cup 2016 - 1/8 Finals	Kazan, Russia	Ext.R Decision (Unanimous)	4	3:00
2016-04-30	Loss	(China) Lu Jianbo	Wu Lin feng	Zhengzhou, China	Decision	3	3:00
2016-01-30	Loss	(France) Cedrick Peynaud	Championnat du Monde de K1	Paris, France	Decision	5	3:00
For the vacant ISKA K-1 World Light-welterweight (-65kg) title.
2015-10-10	Loss	(Morocco) Ilias Bulaid	Enfusion Live 32	Gent, Belgium	Decision	3	3:00
2015-09-06	Win	(Portugal) Carlos Correia	Fight Dreams 2	Albacete, Spain	Decision (Unanimous)	3	3:00
2015-07-11	Win	(Russia) Dmitrii Grafov	12th USSR Martial Arts Championship	Moscow, Russia	Decision (Majority)	5	3:00
Defends the ISKA Low Kick World Welterweight (-67kg) title.
2015-04-05	Win	(Germany) Lom-Ali Eeskiev	Time Fight	Brussels, Belgium	Decision (Unanimous)	3	3:00
2015-03-21	Win	(France) Kichima Yattabare	Meaux Fight IV	Meaux, France	Decision (Unanimous)	5	3:00
Wins the vacant ISKA Low Kick World Welterweight (-67kg) title.
2014-12-06	Win	(Spain) Alejandro Bonilla	Iron Kick Fight Night	Málaga, Spain	Decision	3	3:00
2014-09-06	Win	(Romania) Adrian Maxim	Fight Dreams	Albacete, Spain	Decision (split)	3	3:00
2014-06-06	Win	(Spain) Diego Ramos	Kick Boxing	Albacete, Spain	Decision (Unanimous)	5	2:00
Wins WFMC Spain K-1 A-class -67kg title.
2014-04-20	Draw	(Belgium) Mathieu Bernard	Fight Time	Brussels, Belgium	Decision	5	2:00
2013-12-15	Loss	(Spain) Ahmed	HMF Poison4 Neopro Series II	Alcalá de Henares, Spain	Decision	3	3:00
2013-11-23	Loss	(United Kingdom) Darren O'Connor	The Annihilation Series	Liverpool, England	Decision (Unanimous)	5	3:00
2013-10-12	Win	(Spain) Avelino Molina	MAD FIGHT	Madrigueras, Spain	Decision (Unanimous)	3	3:00
2013-08-31	Win	(Spain) Adam Martin Asalto	The Boxing Club	Pozo Cañada, Spain	Decision (Unanimous)	5	2:00
2013-05-24	Win	(Portugal) Ronald Santos	Ring Warriors	Gineta, Spain	KO (Left hook to the liver)	1	2:15
2013-04-13	Win	(Spain) Gabi Ginu		Spain	Decision (Unanimous)	3	3:00
2013-03-31	Win	(Belgium) Soufiane Hammani	Fight Time	Brussels, Belgium	Decision (Unanimous)	3	3:00
2012-11-17	Win	(Spain) Abdo Tabaki	Heroes IV	Spain	Decision	3	2:00
2012-09-01	Win	(Spain) Jesus Cabello	Kombat League	Spain	TKO	4	
Wins Kombat League Spain K-1 rules Pro-Am -64kg title.
Legend: Win Loss Draw/No contest Notes

== See also ==
- List of male kickboxers
