= Liu Xiangming =

Chinese Muay Thai kickboxer

- Born: July 11, 1994 (age 32); Shangqiu, Henan, China
- Nationality: (China) Chinese
- Height: 175 cm (5 ft 9 in)
- Weight: 65 kg (143 lb; 10.2 st)
- Style: Muay Thai, Kickboxing
- Stance: Orthodox
- Fighting out of: Bozhou, China
- Team: Xiangming Fight Club

Kickboxing record
- Total: 59
- Wins: 41
- By knockout: 14
- Losses: 18
- By knockout: 7

Liu Xiangming (Chinese: 刘响明) is a Chinese Muay Thai kickboxer.

As of 1 August 2020, he is ranked the #9 featherweight in the world by Combat Press.

== Titles and achievements ==
=== Amateur ===
- 2009 China National Muay Thai Championship 63.5 kg Runner-up
- 2009 AMC Muay Thai Championship Winner
- 2010 China National Muay Thai Championship 63.5 kg Runner-up

=== Professional ===
- Wu Lin Feng
  - 2019 WLF China vs Russia 8-man Tournament Winner
  - 2021 Wu Lin Feng Global Kung Fu -67 kg Tournament runner-up
  - 2021 Wu Lin Feng Fight of the Year (vs Wang Pengfei)

== Fight record ==
Kickboxing record
41 Wins (14 (T)KO's), 18 Losses, 0 Draw
Date	Result	Opponent	Event	Location	Method	Round	Time
2022-12-09	Win	(China) Er Kang	Wu Lin Feng 532, Final	Zhengzhou, China	Decision	3	3:00
2022-12-09	Win	(China) Zhang Kui	Wu Lin Feng 532, Semi Final	Zhengzhou, China	Decision	3	3:00
2022-12-09	Win	(China) Shang Xifeng	Wu Lin Feng 532, Quarter Final	Zhengzhou, China	Decision	3	3:00
2021-05-29	Win	(Thailand) Thodkui Manas	Wu Lin Feng 2021: World Contender League 4th Stage	Zhengzhou, China	Decision	3	3:00
2021-01-23	Loss	(China) Wang Pengfei	Wu Lin Feng 2021: Global Kung Fu Festival, -67 kg Tournament Final	Macao, China	TKO (3 Knockdowns/Punches)	2	
For the Wu Lin Feng -67 kg Global Kung Fu Tournament title.
2021-01-23	Win	(China) Jia Aoqi	Wu Lin Feng 2021: Global Kung Fu Festival, -67 kg Tournament Semi Final	Macao, China	Decision (Unanimous)	3	3:00
2021-01-23	Win	(China) Meng Guodong	Wu Lin Feng 2021: Global Kung Fu Festival, -67 kg Tournament Quarter Final	Macao, China	KO (Straight to the body)	2	
2020-08-03	Loss	(China) Wei Rui	Wu Lin Feng 2020: King's Super Cup 4th Group Stage	Zhengzhou, China	Decision (Unanimous)	3	3:00
2020-06-13	Win	(China) Jia Aoqi	Wu Lin Feng 2020: King's Super Cup 2nd Group Stage	Zhengzhou, China	KO (High Kick)	2	
2020-01-18	Win	(Iran) Peyman Ordouzadeh	Wu Lin Feng 2020: WLF World Championship in Baise	Baise, China	TKO	3	
2019-11-30	Loss	(China) Wang Pengfei	Wu Lin Feng 2019: WLF -67kg World Cup 2019-2020 6th Group Stage	Zhengzhou, China	Decision (Split)	5	3:00
For the Wu Lin Feng -65kg title.
2019-10-26	Win	(Thailand) Rambo Pet.Por.Tor.Or	Wu Lin Feng 2019: WLF -67kg World Cup 2019-2020 5th Group Stage	Zhengzhou, China	KO (Spinning back fist)	2	
2019-09-20	Win	(China) Li Xiaolong	Wu Lin Feng 2019: WLF China vs Russia, China vs Russia 8-man Tournament Final	Moscow, Russia	KO	1	
Wins China vs Russia 8-man Tournament.
2019-09-20	Win	(China) Hu Zheng	Wu Lin Feng 2019: WLF China vs Russia, China vs Russia 8-man Tournament Semi Final	Moscow, Russia	Decision	3	3:00
2019-09-20	Win	(Russia) Farid Yadulayev	Wu Lin Feng 2019: WLF China vs Russia, China vs Russia 8-man Tournament Quarter Final	Moscow, Russia	Decision	3	3:00
2019-07-27	Win	(Iran) Masoud Abdolmaleki	Wu Lin Feng 2019: WLF -67kg World Cup 2019-2020 2nd Group Stage	Zhengzhou, China			
2019-03-30	Win	(China) Meng Guodong	Wu Lin Feng 2019: WLF x Lumpinee - China vs Thailand, -65 kg Contender Tournament Final	Zhengzhou, China	Decision	3	3:00
2019-03-30	Win	(Korea) Chok Yeong Jae	Wu Lin Feng 2019: WLF x Lumpinee - China vs Thailand, -65 kg Contender Tournament Semi Final	Zhengzhou, China	Decision (Unanimous)	3	3:00
2018-12-08	Win	(Thailand) Panpayak Jareon	Wu Lin Feng 2018: WLF x S1 - China vs Thailand	Thailand	KO		
2018-11-03	Win	(Russia) Kazbek Alisultanov	Wu Lin Feng 2018: WLF -67kg World Cup 2018-2019 5th Round	China	Ext.R Decision	4	3:00
2018-07-07	Win	(Russia) Takhmasib Kerimov	Wu Lin Feng 2018: WLF -67kg World Cup 2018-2019 1st Round	Zhengzhou, China	Decision (Unanimous)	3	3:00
2018-04-27	Win	(Tajikistan) Audi	2018 Kings League	Guangzhou, China	Decision (Unanimous)	3	3:00
2018-04-07	Loss	(Spain) Khyzer Hayat Nawaz	Wu Lin Feng 2018: World Championship Shijiazhuang	Shijiazhuang, China	Decision (Unanimous)	3	3:00
2017-11-11	Win	(Spain) Jacko Nicola	Glory of Heroes: China VS Spain	Madrid, Spain	Decision (Unanimous)	3	3:00
2017-09-23	Win	(Thailand) Katanyu	Glory of Heroes: Luoyang	Luoyang, China	KO	1	
2017-04-28	Loss	(Romania) Cristian Spetcu	Rise of Heroes / Conquest of Heroes: Chengde	Chengde, China	KO (Punches)	3	
2017-03-25	Loss	(Thailand) Subsakorn	Rise of Heroes: Hengyang	Hengyang, China	Decision (Unanimous)	3	3:00
2017-02-18	Win	(New Zealand) Sam Hill	Rise of Heroes 7: China vs New Zealand	Auckland, New Zealand	Decision (Unanimous)	3	3:00
2017-01-01	Win	(Russia) Abdulmalik Mueididor	Rise of Heroes 6	Puning, China	TKO	2	1:25
2016-12-17	Win	(Thailand) Manaowan Sitsongpeenong	Rise of Heroes 5	Nanning, China	Decision (Unanimous)	3	3:00
2016-10-29	Loss	(Spain) Manuel Fernandez	Rise of Heroes 3	Changji, China	TKO (Knee)	1	
2016-09-03	Win	(Spain) Eduardo del Prado	Wu Lin Feng	China	Decision (Unanimous)	3	3:00
2016-06-17	Win	(France) Sofiane Bougossa	Wu Lin Feng	Zhengzhou, China	Decision	3	3:00
2016-05-07	Loss	(Thailand) Tepthanee Winai	Glory of Heroes 2	Shenzhen, China	Decision (Unanimous)	3	3:00
2016-03-05	Win	(Morocco) Mohamed Didouh	Wu Lin Feng	Zhengzhou, China	Decision	3	3:00
2015-12-05	Loss	(Turkey) Hasan Toy	Wu Lin Feng	China	TKO (Leg Injury)	2	
2015-10-04	Win	(Germany) Nuri Kaca	Wu Lin Feng	China	KO		
2015-06-26	Win	(Japan) Kazunari Kimura	Silk Road Hero	China	KO		
2015-06-06	Win	(Germany) Johann Dederer	Wu Lin Feng 2015 Battle of the Century	Jiyuan, China	KO (Left Hook)	2	
2015-04-18	Win	(Germany) Kim-Robin Leinz	WLF x DAY OF DESTRUCTION 10	Hamburg, Germany	KO (Right Cross)	3	1:05
2014-06-29	Loss	(Iran) Mahdi Mahmoudvand	Kunlun Fight 6	Chongqing, China	TKO	1	
2014-05-10	Win	(Germany) Felix Minners	WLF x DAY OF DESTRUCTION 08	Hamburg, Germany	Decision	3	3:00
2014-04-26	Win	(Kazakhstan) Roman	WCK Muaythai C3	Ya'an, China	Decision	5	3:00
2014-03-30	Loss	(Korea) Dongsu Kim	Kunlun Fight 3	Harbin, China	Decision (Unanimous)	3	3:00
2014-03-15	Win	(Thailand) Michael Boom	Wu Lin Feng	China	KO (Punches)		
2014-01-11	Loss	(United States) Damian	Wu Lin Feng	China	Decision (Unanimous)	3	3:00
2013-07-28	Win	(Thailand) Chen Parker	Wu Lin Feng	Zhengzhou, China			
2013-05-03	Win	(United States) Dennis	WCK Muaythai C3	China	Decision	5	3:00
2013-02-03	Loss	(China) Xie Lei	WCK Muaythai C3 King of Fighting Tournament Final	Xichang, China	Decision	3	3:00
For the WCK Muaythai Lightweight International Title -60 kg.
2012-10-21	Win	(South Korea) Yu Hyun Woo	Wu Lin Feng	China	Decision	3	3:00
2012-10-09	Loss	(Thailand) Changpuek EliteFightClub	Thailand vs Asia: The Best of Malaysia	Malaysia	KO	2	
2012-02-04	Win	(France) Auteuil		China	Decision	3	3:00
2011-07-16	Loss	(China) Xie Lei	Wu Lin Feng	Zhengzhou, China	Decision (Unanimous)	3	3:00
2011-04-23	Win	(China) Zhou Hongzhang	Long Xing Tianxia-WBC MUAYTHAI	China	Decision	3	3:00
2011-03-05	Win	(China) Hu Yafei	Wu Lin Feng	China	Decision	3	3:00
2010-12-25	Win	(China) Guo Kaihua	Wu Lin Feng	China	KO		
Legend: Win Loss Draw/No contest Notes
