= Wang Pengfei =

Chinese kickboxer

- Born: April 5, 1993 (age 33); Zhoukou, China
- Nationality: Chinese
- Height: 176 cm (5 ft 9 in)
- Weight: 65 kg (143 lb; 10.2 st)
- Style: Sanda, Kickboxing
- Stance: Orthodox
- Fighting out of: China
- Team: Liaoning Innovation Fighting Club

Kickboxing record
- Total: 55
- Wins: 34
- By knockout: 10
- Losses: 21

Wang Pengfei (Chinese: 王鹏飞) is a Chinese Sanda kickboxer. As of February 2021, he is the #4 ranked super-featherweight according to Combat Press.

== Titles and accomplishments ==
Amateur

- 3x Liaoning Province Sanda Champion
- 2013 China -71 kg Kickboxing Championship Runner-up

Professional

- Wu Lin Feng
  - 2014 Wu Lin Feng Rookie of the Year
  - 2019 Wu Lin Feng World -65 kg Champion (Defended once)
  - 2019 Wu Lin Feng Fighter of the Year
  - 2021 Wu Lin Feng Global Kung Fu -67 kg Tournament Winner
  - 2021 Wu Lin Feng Fight of the Year (vs Liu Xiangming)

== Kickboxing record ==
Professional Kickboxing record
35 Wins (10 (T)KO's), 22 Losses, 0 draw
Date	Result	Opponent	Event	Location	Method	Round	Time
2022-01-01	Loss	(China) Meng Gaofeng	Wu Lin Feng 2022	Tangshan, China	Decision (Unanimous)	5	3:00
Loses the Wu Lin Feng World -65 kg title.
2021-11-27	Win	(China) Zhou Jiaqiang	Wu Lin Feng 2021: World Contender League 7th Stage Contender League Semi Final	Zhengzhou, China	Decision	3	3:00
2021-09-30	Loss	(China) Jia Aoqi	Wu Lin Feng 2021: World Contender League 6th Stage	Zhengzhou, China	Decision (Unanimous)	3	3:00
2021-07-03	Win	(China) Hu Yafei	Wu Lin Feng 2021: World Contender League 5th Stage	Zhengzhou, China	Decision (Unanimous)	3	3:00
2021-05-22	Win	(China) Zhou Jiaqiang	Wu Lin Feng 2021: World Contender League 3rd Stage	Xin County, China	Decision (Unanimous)	3	3:00
2021-04-24	Win	(China) Er Kang	Wu Lin Feng 2021: World Contender League 2nd Stage	Zhengzhou, China	Decision (Unanimous)	3	3:00
2021-01-23	Win	(China) Liu Xiangming	Wu Lin Feng 2021: Global Kung Fu Festival, -67 kg Tournament Final	Macao, China	TKO (3 Knockdowns/Punches)	2	
Wins the Wu Lin Feng -67 kg Global Kung Fu Tournament.
2021-01-23	Win	(China) Tie Yinghua	Wu Lin Feng 2021: Global Kung Fu Festival, -67 kg Tournament Semi Final	Macao, China	Decision (Unanimous)	3	3:00
2021-01-23	Win	(China) Wei Ninghui	Wu Lin Feng 2021: Global Kung Fu Festival, -67 kg Tournament Quarter Final	Macao, China	Decision (Unanimous)	3	3:00
2020-10-16	Loss	(China) Wei Ninghui	Wu Lin Feng 2020: China New Kings Champions Challenge match	Hangzhou, China	Decision	3	3:00
2020-08-29	Win	(China) Zhang Chunyu	Wu Lin Feng 2020: China New Kings Tournament Final	Zhengzhou, China	Decision	3	3:00
2020-06-13	Loss	(China) Wei Rui	Wu Lin Feng 2020: King's Super Cup 2nd Group Stage	Zhengzhou, China	Decision (Unanimous)	3	3:00
2020-05-15	Loss	(China) Jia Aoqi	Wu Lin Feng 2020: King's Super Cup 1st Group Stage	Zhengzhou, China	Decision (Split)	3	3:00
2020-01-11	Loss	(Romania) Adrian Maxim	Wu Lin Feng 2020: WLF World Cup 2019-2020 Final	Zhuhai, China	Decision (unanimous)	3	3:00
2019-11-30	Win	(China) Liu Xiangming	Wu Lin Feng 2019: WLF -67kg World Cup 2019-2020 6th Group Stage	Zhengzhou, China	Decision (Split)	5	3:00
Defends the Wu Lin Feng World -65 kg title.
2019-09-06	Loss	(Thailand) Rambo Petch Por.Tor.Aor	Wu Lin Feng 2019: WLF at Lumpinee - China vs Thailand	Bangkok, Thailand	TKO (Injury)	1	3:00
2019-07-21	Win	(Japan) Kota Nakano	Wu Lin Feng x Krush 103 - China vs Japan	Tokyo, Japan	Decision (Majority)	3	3:00
2019-04-27	Win	(United States) Jordan Marciano	Wu Lin Feng 2019: WLF -63kg Championship World Tournament	Zhuhai, China	KO (Punches)	2	
2019-03-24	Win	(Greece) Ilias Myrdini	Wu Lin Feng 2019: WLF x Gods of War XII - China vs Greece	Athens, Greece	Decision (Unanimous)	3	3:00
2019-01-02	Win	(Portugal) Diego Freitas	Wu Lin Feng 2019: -65kg World Championship Tournament Final	Hengqin, China	Decision	3	3:00
Wins the Wu Lin Feng World -65 kg title.
2019-01-02	Win	(China) Lu Jun	Wu Lin Feng 2019: -65kg World Championship Tournament Semi Finals	Hengqin, China	Decision	3	3:00
2019-01-02	Win	(Morocco) Hamza Essalih	Wu Lin Feng 2019: -65kg World Championship Tournament Quarter Finals	Hengqin, China	Ext.R Decision	4	3:00
2018-11-03	Loss	(Russia) Aleksei Ulianov	Wu Lin Feng 2018: WLF -67kg World Cup 2018-2019 5th Round	China	Decision	3	3:00
2018-09-29	Win	(Uzbekistan) Zyodila Kubanov	David Zunwu World Fighting Championship	Macau	TKO	2	
2018-09-01	Win	(China) Meng Qinghao	Wu Lin Feng 2018: WLF -67kg World Cup 2018-2019 3rd Round	Zhengzhou, China	Decision	3	3:00
2018-07-07	Loss	(Thailand) Jomthong Chuwattana	Wu Lin Feng 2018: WLF -67kg World Cup 2018-2019 1st Round	Zhengzhou, China	Decision (Unanimous)	3	3:00
2018-06-16	Win	(Russia) Klimov	Wu Lin Feng 2018: China vs Netherlands & Russia	Shenyang, China	Decision (Unanimous)	3	3:00
2018-04-07	Loss	(Romania) Adrian Maxim	Wu Lin Feng 2018: World Championship Shijiazhuang	Shijiazhuang, China	Ext.R Decision	4	3:00
2018-03-24	Win	(Greece) Sokratis Kerpatsi	Wu Lin Feng 2018: Greece VS China - Gods of War 11	Athens, Greece	KO (Right High Kick)	3	
2018-02-03	Win	(Netherlands) Juan Javier Barragan	Wu Lin Feng 2018: World Championship in Shenzhen	Shenzhen, China	KO	2	
2017-09-09	Win	(Azerbaijan) Tula	Wu Lin Feng New Generation	Linyi, China	KO	2	2:45
2017-08-05	Win	(Thailand) Singsuriya	Wu Lin Feng 2017: China VS Thailand	Zhengzhou, China	Decision (Unanimous)	3	3:00
2017-06-03	Win	(Japan) Shota Hayashi	Wu Lin Feng 2017: China VS Japan	Changsha, China	Decision (Unanimous)	3	3:00
2017-05-06	Win	(Netherlands) Massaro Glunder	Wu Lin Feng 2017: China VS USA	Zhengzhou, China	Decision (Unanimous)	3	3:00
2017-03-25	Win	(New Zealand) Quade Taranaki	Wu Lin Feng China vs New Zealand	Zhengzhou, China	Decision	3	3:00
2017-03-04	Win	(Spain) Khyzer Hayat Nawaz	Wu Lin Feng 2017: Kung Fu VS Muay Thai	Zhengzhou, China	TKO	1	
2017-01-14	Loss	(Thailand) Kaew Fairtex	Wu Lin Feng 2016 World Kickboxing Championship	Zhengzhou, China	Decision (Unanimous)	3	3:00
2016-12-03	Win	(Japan) Hiromitsu Miyagi	Wu Lin Feng 2016: WLF x Krush - China vs Japan	Zhengzhou, China	TKO (3 Knockdowns/Left High Kick)	2	
2016-11-17	Win	(United States) Joey Pagliuso	Wu Lin Feng 2016: China vs USA	Las Vegas, United States	KO (Right Hook)	2	
2016-10-15	Win	(Russia) Sasha	WKPL Dream Heroes World Boxing Championship	Fengcheng, Jiangxi, China	Decision	3	3:00
2016-08-20	Loss	(Japan) Masaaki Noiri	Krush 68	Tokyo, Japan	KO (Left middle Kick)	1	1:37
2016-07-15	Loss	(Russia) Tamerlan Bashirov	Wu Lin Feng : Russia vs China	Zhengzhou, China	Decision (Unanimous)	3	3:00
2016-06-17	Win	(Germany) Kevin Burmester	Wu Lin Feng 2017: China VS Germany	Zhengzhou, China	Decision	3	3:00
2016-04-30	Win	(Spain) Jonatan Fabian	Wu Lin Feng	Zhengzhou, China	Decision	3	3:00
2016-04-02	Loss	(Uganda) Umar Semata	EM Legend 7	Xichang, China	Decision	3	3:00
2015-12-17	Loss	(Germany) Juri Kehl	Mix Fight Gala XIX	Germany	Decision	3	3:00
2015-09-12	Loss	(Russia) Ariyal Saklov	Huawu Finals Series 3	Yantai, China	KO		
2015-06-26	Loss	(Thailand) Kem Sitsongpeenong	Silu Hero	Ürümqi, China	KO (right knee to the body)	2	
2015-04-04	Loss	(China) Yang Zhuo	Wu Lin Feng 2015 World 67 kg Tournament, quarter final	Zhengzhou, China	TKO	2	
2015-04-04	Win	(United Kingdom) Charlie Peters	Wu Lin Feng 2015 World 67 kg Tournament, 1st round	Zhengzhou, China	Decision (Split)	3	3:00
2014-12-31	Win	(Thailand) Lianchai	Legend of Kung fu World Championship	Luoyang, China	KO (Fying Knee)	1	2:28
2014-10-25	Loss	(Netherlands) Rafik Casi	Wu Lin Feng	Netherlands			
2014-07-05	Win	(Republic of Ireland)	Wu Lin Feng	Dublin, Ireland			
2014-04-27	Loss	(China) Qiu Jianliang	Wu Lin Feng World Championship 2014 – 67 kg Tournament, Final	Luohe, China	Decision (Unanimous)	3	3:00
For the Wu Lin Feng International -65 kg title.
2014-04-27	Win	(Korea)	Wu Lin Feng World Championship 2014 – 67 kg Tournament, Semi Finals	Luohe, China	KO	1	
2014-01-18	Win	(United States) Arthur Sorsor	Wu Lin Feng	Xiangyang, China	Decision (Split)	3	3:00
2014-01-01	Loss	(China) Han Jie	Zhenhua Heroes	Changchun, China	Decision	3	3:00
For the WKC World title.
2013-12-31	Win	(China) Ahu	Zhenhua Heroes	Changchun, China	Decision	3	3:00
Legend: Win Loss Draw/No contest Notes

Amateur Kickboxing record
Date	Result	Opponent	Event	Location	Method	Round	Time
2012-05-20	Loss	(China) Tie Yinghua	2012 China Kickboxing Championships	Kaifeng, China	Decision	3	3:00
Legend: Win Loss Draw/No contest Notes
