= Hamza Essalih =

French kickboxer

- Born: May 22, 1992 (age 34); Amsterdam, Netherlands
- Native name: Soesie
- Nationality: Moroccan; Dutch
- Height: 1.76 m (5 ft 9 1/2 in)
- Weight: 63 kg (139 lb; 9.9 st)
- Division: Lightweight
- Style: Kickboxing

Kickboxing record
- Total: 58
- Wins: 51
- By knockout: 5
- Losses: 5
- Draws: 2

Hamza Essalih (Arabic: حمزة الصاليح, born May 29, 1992, in Amsterdam, Netherlands), is a Dutch-Moroccan kickboxer. As of May 2019 he was the #10 ranked Bantamweight in the world by Combat Press.

== Biography and career ==
On June 25, 2016, Hamza Essalih lost his third fight during Glory 31 in the Amsterdam Rai. In this fight, Paul Jansen, who Essalih had previously defeated, won the match by points (29–27) after delivering a knee to Essalih's head, resulting in an eight-count. This was only Essalih's third loss in 61 fights.".

In 2017, he signed his first professional contract with Enfusion under the training of Mosab Amrani.

In 2006, he received the role of actor in the Dutch feature film Langer Licht released in 2006. Hamza Essalih has only one MMA fight, which resulted in a loss.

== Personal life ==
He is the brother of Omar Essalih, one of the figures of the Mocro Maffia. He strongly condemns and completely detaches himself from his brother's acts before the latter is shot on the evening of May 2, 2020 in Amsterdam.

== Titles and achievements ==
- 2016 Champion of the Netherlands
- 2017 Champion of the Netherlands
- International Professional Combat Council
  - 2019 IPCC K-1 World -65kg Champion
- Enfusion
  - 2024 Enfusion World Featherweight (-65kg) Champion

== Kickboxing record ==
Kickboxing record
Date	Result	Opponent	Event	Location	Method	Round	Time
2026-10-10	Loss	(Morocco) Mohamed Hamami	Sportmani Events – ‘Don’t Call It A Comeback II’	Almere, Netherlands	KO (punch)	1	2:59
2024-12-14	Win	(Netherlands) Rhydel Vogelenzang	Enfusion #145	Wuppertal, Germany	Decision	5	3:00
Wins the vacant Enfusion World Featherweight title.
2024-03-02	Win	(Netherlands) Rhydel Vogelenzang	Enfusion #134	Nijmegen, Netherlands	Decision	3	3:00
2022-09-24	Loss	(Turkey) Deniz Demirkapu	Enfusion 112	Eindhoven, Netherlands	KO (punches)	1	3:00
For the vacant Enfusion World Featherweight title.
2019-11-02	Loss	(Morocco) Soufiane Kaddouri	Enfusion 90	Antwerp, Belgium	TKO (doctor stoppage)	3	2:52
For the Enfusion World Super Bantamweight title.
2019-05-04	Win	(Germany) Andrej Bruhl	Enfusion 84	Darmstadt, Germany	Decision	3	3:00
Wins IPCC World -65kg title.
2019-06-29	Loss	(China) Jia Aoqi	Wu Lin Feng 2019: WLF -67kg World Cup 2019-2020 1st Group Stage	Zhengzhou, China	TKO (doctor stoppage)	2	0:17
2019-02-23	Win	(South Sudan) Lofogo Sarour	Enfusion 78	Eindhoven, Netherlands	Decision	3	3:00
2019-01-02	Loss	(China) Wang Pengfei	Wu Lin Feng 2019: WLF -65kg World Championship Tournament Quarter Finals	Hengqin, China	Ext.R decision	4	3:00
2018-10-27	Win	(France) Eddy Nait Slimani	Enfusion Talents #60	Oberhausen, Germany	Ext.R decision	4	3:00
2018-05-12	Win	(Suriname) Damencio Patty	Enfusion Talents #52	The Hague, Netherlands	Decision	3	3:00
2017-11-11	Win	(France) Islem Hamech	Enfusion Talents #40	Amsterdam, Netherlands	Decision	3	3:00
2017-09-30	Loss	(Morocco) Soufiane Kaddouri	Enfusion Talents #37	Antwerp, Belgium	Ext.R decision	4	3:00
2017-03-24	Win	(Morocco) Ayoub Ahmamou	Enfusion Talents #30	Abu Dhabi	TKO (doctor stoppage)	2	
2016-09-17	Win	(Belgium) Nafi Bilalovski	Enfusion Live	Antwerp, Belgium	Decision (unanimous)	3	3:00
2016-06-25	Loss	(Netherlands) Paul Jansen	Glory 31: Amsterdam, Prelims	Amsterdam, Netherlands	Decision (unanimous)	3	3:00
2016-05-20	Loss	(Morocco) Mohammed Didouh	Enfusion Fighting Rookies	Amsterdam, Netherlands	Decision	3	3:00
2015-12-04	Win	(Morocco) Redouane Boukerch	Glory 26: Amsterdam, Prelims	Amsterdam, Netherlands	Decision (unanimous)	3	3:00
2015-08-08	Loss	(Thailand) Saenchai	Fight League	Morocco	Decision	5	3:00
2015-05-24	Win	(Netherlands) Massaro Glunder	Enfusion Kickboxing Talents	Amsterdam, Netherlands	Ext.R decision	4	3:00
2015-03-07	Win	(Netherlands) Wilson Mendes	Fight League - The Beginning	Hoofddorp, Netherlands	Decision	3	3:00
2014-09-27	Draw	(Romania) Cristian Spetcu	SUPERKOMBAT World Grand Prix IV 2014	Almere, Netherlands	Ext.R decision	4	3:00
2014-01-25	Win	(Suriname) Sergio Wielzen	Enfusion Fighting Rookies	Antwerp, Belgium	Ext.R decision	4	3:00
2013-09-17	Win	(Brazil) Maykol Yurk	Fight Fans	Netherlands	Decision	3	3:00
2013-05-26	Win	(Netherlands) Danny Moi Thuk Shung	Enfusion Fighting Rookies	Amsterdam, Netherlands	Decision	5	3:00
2013-03-16	Draw	(Spain) Javier Hernandez	El Desafio k1	Málaga, Spain	Decision	3	3:00
2013-01-26	Loss	(France) Eddy Nait Slimani	Stars Night	Vitrolles, France	Decision	3	3:00
2012-12-01	Win	(Turkey) Idris Demirci	Zaansation 2	Netherlands	KO (flying knee)	3	
2011-07-23	Loss	(Japan) Kosuke Komiyama	RISE 80	Tokyo, Japan	Decision (majority)	3	3:00
Legend: Win Loss Draw/no contest Notes
