= Wei Ninghui =

Chinese Muay Thai kickboxer (born 1993)

- Born: September 15, 1993 (age 33); Zhoukou, Henan, China
- Native name: 位宁辉
- Other names: Terrorist TC boy
- Nationality: (China) Chinese
- Height: 1.70 m (5 ft 7 in)
- Weight: 65.7 kg (145 lb; 10.35 st)
- Division: Featherweight
- Style: Muay Thai
- Stance: Orthodox
- Team: Xing Hui kickboxing pavilion （星辉搏击俱乐部）
- Years active: 2012-present

Kickboxing record
- Total: 59
- Wins: 41
- By knockout: 13
- Losses: 17
- By knockout: 1
- Draws: 1
- Last updated on: June 28, 2018

Wei Ninghui (simplified Chinese: 位宁辉; traditional Chinese: 位寧輝; pinyin: wèi níng huī; born September 15, 1993) is a Chinese Muay Thai kickboxer.

He was ranked as a top ten featherweight by Combat Press between March and December of 2017.

== Kickboxing career ==
At the age of twelve he went to martial arts school, and at the age of fifteen he went to Thailand training in Muay Thai.

On January 25, 2014 at the Pattaya Beach Square in Pattaya, Thailand, in Kunlun Fight 1, Wei beat Suthin Banchamek by TKO.

In November 21, 2015, in Kunlun Fight 34, Wei beat Andrea Serra by TKO.

On April 26, 2016 in Zhoukou Gymnasium in Zhoukou, Wei beat Pascal Koster by decision.

Wei took part in the 2016 Kunlun Fight Welterweight Tournament. He defeated Craig Dickson by a second round KO in the quarter finals. He beat Meng Guodong by a first round lowkick KO in the semifinals. In the finals, Ninghui fought Abdellah Ezbiri, whom he beat by a first round lowkick KO.

Wei fought Jordan Kranio during Kunlun Fight 70. The fight was ruled a draw after three rounds, and went into an extra fourth round. After the extra round was fought, it was once again ruled a draw. Ninghui was scheduled to fight Kenta Yamata in during Kunlun Fight 73. He won the fight by unanimous decision. Ninghui rematched Kranio during Kunlun Fight 76, and won by TKO in the second round.

Ninghui participated in the 2017 KLF 66 kg tournament, and fought Yang Zhuo in the quarterfinals. Wei lost to the eventual tournament winner by majority decision.

Ninghui participated in the 2018 Kunlun Fight 66 kg tournament, and was scheduled to fight Soufiane Kaddouri in the quarterfinals. Kaddouri won the bout by an extra round, unanimous, decision.

He fought Ilias Bulaid during the 2019/20 WLF Group Stage. Bulaid won the fight by KO, after landing a right straight to the body of Ninghui.

He won a decision against Wang Pengfei during WLF New Kings Champions Challenge.

== Championships and awards ==
- Kickboxing
  - 2016 Kunlun Fight Welterweight Tournament Champion
  - 2013 WMC 63.5 kg World Champion
  - 2012 King's Cup of Muaythai 60 kg Champion

== Kickboxing record ==
Professional Kickboxing Record
42 wins (13 KOs), 20 losses, 1 Draw
Date	Result	Opponent	Event	Location	Method	Round	Time
2022-12-31		(Thailand) Kachoenram Aniwat	Battle Time Championship	Kunming, China			
2021-11-27	Loss	(China) Jia Aoqi	Wu Lin Feng 2021: World Contender League 7th Stage Contender League Semi Final	Zhengzhou, China	Decision	3	3:00
2021-08-07	Loss	(China) Tie Yinghua	Wu Lin Feng 2021: WLF in Tangshan	Tangshan, China	Decision (Unanimous)	3	3:00
2021-07-03	Win	(China) Zhou Jiaqiang	Wu Lin Feng 2021: World Contender League 5th Stage	Zhengzhou, China	Decision (Split)	3	3:00
2021-01-24	Loss	(China) Wang Pengfei	Wu Lin Feng 2021: Global Kung Fu Festival, Quarter Final	Macao, China	Decision (Unanimous)	3	3:00
2020-10-16	Win	(China) Wang Pengfei	Wu Lin Feng 2020: China New Kings Champions Challenge match	Hangzhou, China	Decision	3	3:00
2019-10-26	Loss	(China) Jia Aoqi	Wu Lin Feng 2019: WLF -67kg World Cup 2019-2020 5th Group Stage	Zhengzhou, China	Decision (Unanimous)	3	
2019-09-13	Loss	(Jordan) Izzeddin Nafez	Kunlun Fight 83	China	Decision	3	3:00
2019-07-27	Win	(Australia) Htaw Mon	Kunlun Fight 81	China	Decision (Unanimous)	3	3:00
2019-06-29	Loss	(Morocco) Ilias Bulaid	Wu Lin Feng 2019: WLF -67kg World Cup 2019-2020 1st Group Stage	Zhengzhou, China	KO (Straight Right to the Body)	3	1:11
2019-04-27	Win	(Canada) Will Romero	Wu Lin Feng 2019: WLF -63kg Championship World Tournament	Zhuhai, China	Decision	3	3:00
2018-12-15	Loss	(Morocco) Soufiane Kaddouri	Kunlun Fight 79 - 66kg World Championship, 1/8 finals	Taiyuan, China	Ex.R Decision (Unanimous)	4	3:00
2018-09-09	Win	(Brazil) Jordan Kranio	Kunlun Fight 76	China	TKO (3 Knockdowns/Left Hook to the Body)	2	
2018-05-06	Win	(Japan) Kenta	Kunlun Fight 73	China	Decision (Unanimous)	3	3:00
2018-03-11	Draw	(Brazil) Jordan Kranio	Kunlun Fight 70	China	Ext. R Decision (Majority)	4	3:00
2017-11-29	Win	(Thailand) Meeha	Yingxiong Hui	Macau, China	Decision (Unanimous)	3	3:00
2017-11-12	Loss	(China) Yang Zhuo	Kunlun Fight 67 - 66kg World Championship, Quarter Finals	Sanya, China	Decision (Majority)	3	3:00
2017-09-30	Win	(Russia) Kirill Smirnov	Topking & Quansheng	Pingtan, China	Decision (Unanimous)	3	3:00
2017-08-27	Win	(Portugal) Jairon Ortega	Kunlun Fight 65 - Kunlun Fight 16 Man Tournament 66 kg-1/8 finals	Qingdao, China	TKO (Right Low Kick)	2	2:33
2017-06-10	Loss	(Thailand) Kompetch Fairtex	Kunlun Fight 62	Bangkok, Thailand	Decision (Majority)	3	3:00
2017-05-14	Win	(Brazil) Hector Santiago	Kunlun Fight 61	China	Decision (Unanimous)	3	3:00
2017-02-26	Win	(Thailand) Kompetch Fairtex	Kunlun Fight 57	China	Decision (Unanimous)	3	3:00
2017-01-01	Win	(Spain) Juan Javier Barragan	Kunlun Fight 56	Sanya, China	KO(Right Hook)	1	2:50
2016-11-17	Loss	(United States) Melsik Baghdasaryan	Wu Lin Feng	Las Vegas, USA	Decision (Unanimous)	3	3:00
2016-09-10	Win	(France) Abdellah Ezbiri	Kunlun Fight 51 - Welterweight Tournament Finals	Fuzhou, China	TKO (Low Kick)	1	
Wins the Kunlun Fight Welterweight Tournament Champion.
2016-09-10	Win	(China) Meng Guodong	Kunlun Fight 51 - Welterweight Tournament Semi Finals	Fuzhou, China	TKO (Low Kick)	1	
2016-09-10	Win	(United Kingdom) Craig Dickson	Kunlun Fight 51 - Welterweight Tournament Quarter Finals	Fuzhou, China	KO	2	
2016-08-07	Win	(Japan) Yosuke Mizuochi	Kunlun Fight 49 & Rebels 45 - Welterweight Tournament 1/8 Finals	Jinan, China	KO	2	
Qualified to Kunlun Fight Welterweight Tournament Final 8.
2016-06-26	Win	(South Korea) Son Star	Kunlun Fight 46	Kunming, China	Decision (Unanimous)	3	3:00
2016-04-26	Win	(Netherlands) Pascal Koster	Kunlun Fight 43	Zhoukou, China	Decision (Unanimous)	3	3:00
2016-03-20	Win	(Georgia (country)) Giorgi Khupenia	Kunlun Fight 39	Dongguan, China	Decision (Unanimous)	3	3:00
2016-02-20	Win	(Uzbekistan) Ziyoo Kubanov	QUSN	Quanzhou, China	TKO	3	
2015-12-19	Win	(South Korea) Kim Dongsu	Kunlun Fight 35	Luoyang, China	Decision (Unanimous)	3	3:00
2015-11-27	Win	(Thailand) McBride	Topking	Nantong, China	Decision (Unanimous)	3	3:00
2015-11-21	Win	(Italy) Andrea Serra	Kunlun Fight 34	Shenzhen, China	TKO	3	
2015-10-03	Loss	(Belarus) Maksim Petkevich	Wu Lin Feng 2015 WLF World Championship Tournament −63 kg, First Round	Hong Kong, China	Decision (Unanimous)	3	3:00
2015-07-28	Loss	(Thailand) Rungravee Sasiprapa	Kunlun Fight & Top King World Series 4	Hong Kong, China	Decision (Unanimous)	3	3:00
2015-07-18	Win	(Japan) Keijiro Miyakoshi	Kunlun Fight 27	Nanjing, China	Decision (Split)	3	3:00
2015-07-01	Win	(Brazil) Jeferson Oliveira	T-one Muay Thai 2015	Beijing, China	KO	1	
2015-06-07	Win	(Poland) Tomasz Makowski	Kunlun Fight 26	Chongqing, China	KO	1	
2015-04-26	Loss	(Thailand) Lerdsila Chumpairtour	Kunlun Fight 23	Changsha, China	Decision (Unanimous)	3	3:00
2015-03-17	Win	(Bosnia and Herzegovina) Denis Purić	Kunlun Fight 21	Sanya, China	KO	2	
2015-02-28	Win	(United States) Marvin Madariaga	Kunlun Fight vs WCK Muaythai	Los Angeles, USA	Decision (Unanimous)	3	3:00
2014-12-27	Win	(Thailand) Rungwanchai	I am National Hero	Zhengzhou, China	Decision (Unanimous)	3	3:00
2014-08-10	Win	(Thailand) Paisley	CFC	Guizhou, China	Decision (Unanimous)	3	3:00
2014-06-07	Loss	(United States) Marvin Madariaga	Kunlun Fight vs WCK Muaythai	Los Angeles, USA	Decision (Unanimous)	3	3:00
2014-04-27	Loss	(Japan) Keijiro Miyakoshi	Kunlun Fight 4	Manila, Philippines	Ext. R Decision (Unanimous)	4	3:00
For the WBC Intercontinental Lightweight title.
2014-01-25	Win	(Thailand) Suthin Banchamek	Kunlun Fight 1	Pattaya, Thailand	TKO	2	
2013-09-17	Win	(Hong Kong) Fong Chuen MING	Combat Renaissance	Hong Kong, China	Decision (Unanimous)	3	3:00
2013-08-12	Loss	(Thailand) Thodkhui MR.Manas	Emei Wushu Festival	Mountain Emei, China	Decision (Unanimous)	3	3:00
2012-08-18	Win	(France)	King's Cup 2012	Bangkok, Thailand	TKO	1	
Wins the 2012 King's Cup of Muaythai 60kg Champion.
Legend: Win Loss Draw/No contest Notes

== See also ==
- List of male kickboxers
