= Jia Aoqi =

Chinese Sanshou kickboxer

- Born: March 26, 1992 (age 34); Luyi, Zhoukou, Henan, China
- Other names: The Condor
- Nationality: Chinese
- Height: 176 cm (5 ft 9 in)
- Weight: 67 kg (148 lb; 10.6 st)
- Division: Featherweight
- Style: Sanda
- Stance: Southpaw
- Fighting out of: China
- Team: Fighting Elements Gym Team A
- Years active: 2015 - present

Kickboxing record
- Total: 44
- Wins: 33
- By knockout: 7
- Losses: 11
- By knockout: 3

Other information
- University: Jiangxi Normal University

Jia Aoqi (Chinese: 贾奥奇, born March 26, 1992) is a Chinese Sanda kickboxer, currently competing in the featherweight division of Wu Lin Feng. A professional competitor since 2015, he was the 2019 WLF 67 kg World Cup winner.

As of April 2023, he is the #1 ranked super featherweight according to Combat Press.

== Kickboxing career ==
=== Wu Lin Feng ===
==== WLF 2019-20 World Cup ====
Aoqi faced Hamza Essalih at Wu Lin Feng 2019: WLF -67kg World Cup 2019-2020 1st Group Stage on June 29, 2019. It was the first bout of the Wu Lin Feng Group A and D round robin, with the eventual group winner qualifying for the 2019-20 tournament final. He won the fight by a second-round technical knockout. Aoqi next faced the former Enfusion 67 kg champion Ilias Bulaid at Wu Lin Feng 2019: WLF -67kg World Cup 2019-2020 3rd Group Stage on August 31, 2019. The fight was ruled a draw after the first three rounds, with Aoqi being awarded the unanimous decision after an extra round was contested. Aoqi next faced Wei Ninghui at Wu Lin Feng 2019: WLF -67kg World Cup 2019-2020 5th Group Stage on October 26, 2019, in the final bout of the group A and D round robin. He won the fight by a dominant unanimous decision, with all of the judges scoring the fight 30–27 in Aoqi's favor.

These three victories earned Aoqi a place in the WLF World Cup 2019-2020 Final, which was held on January 11, 2020. Aoqi faced Tawanchai PK Saenchaimuaythaigym in the semifinals of the one-day tournament. He won the fight by a second-round knockout, stopping Tawanchai with a flurry of punches fifty seconds into the second round. Aoqi advanced to the tournament finals, where he faced the defending champion Petchtanong Banchamek. He won the fight by unanimous decision, with all of the judges scoring the fight 29–28 for him. Aside from winning his first professional title, Aoqi was awarded a prize of $100,000 as well.

==== Losing streak ====
After capturing the World Cup title, Aoqi was booked to face Liu Xiangming at Wu Lin Feng 2020: King's Super Cup 2nd Group Stage on June 13, 2020. He lost the fight by a second-round knockout, as Xiangming stopped him with a head kick. Despite this loss, Aoqi was scheduled to face the pound for pound talent Wei Rui at Wu Lin Feng 2020: King's Super Cup 5th Group Stage on September 23, 2020. He lost the fight by unanimous decision. Aoqi next faced Ji Xiang at Wu Lin Feng 2020: China 70kg Championship Tournament on November 28, 2020. He lost the fight by a second-round knockout.

Regardless of these losses, Aoqi was scheduled to take part in the 2021 Wu Lin Feng Global Kung Fu Festival, which was held on January 23, 2021, in Macao, China. He faced Ji Xiang in the quarterfinal bout and was able to avenge his loss, as he won the fight by unanimous decision, with scores of 29–28. Aoqi faced another former opponent, Liu Xiangming, in the tournament semifinals. He suffered his second career loss to Xiangming, who won the fight by unanimous decision.

==== Continued WLF career ====
Aoqi faced Hu Yafei at Wu Lin Feng 2021: World Contender League 4th Stage on May 29, 2021, in the first round of the group A Gold Belt qualification tournament. He won the fight by decision. Aoqi next faced Er Kang at Wu Lin Feng 2021: World Contender League 5th Stage on July 3, 2021. He won the fight by unanimous decision, with scores of 30–27. Aoqi faced Wang Pengfei at Wu Lin Feng 2021: World Contender League 6th Stage on September 30, 2021, in the final round of the group tournament. He won the fight by unanimous decision.

These three wins earned Aoqi a place in the final tournament of the Golden Belt contender league. He faced Wei Ninghui in the semi-final bout at Wu Lin Feng 2021: World Contender League 7th Stage on November 27, 2021. He won the fight by unanimous decision, with scores of 29–28.

Aoqi faced Meng Gaofeng at Wu Lin Feng x Huya Kung Fu Carnival 6 on July 9, 2022. He won the fight by unanimous decision, with score of 29–28.

Aoqi faced Wacharalek Or.Kwanmuang at Wu Lin Feng 531 on September 24, 2022. Wacharalek was deducted a point before the start of the bout for missing weight. Aoqi won the fight by unanimous decision. He twice knocked his opponent down, once in the second and once in the third round.

Aoqi was expected to face Mikel Sortino in the quarterfinals of the -67 kg Wu Lin Feng tournament at Wu Lin Feng 2023: Chinese New Year on February 4, 2023, but was forced to withdraw with an undisclosed injury.

Aoqi faced David Mejia in a -69 kg catchweight bout at Wu Lin Feng 539 on June 24, 2023. He lost the fight by decision. Aoqi faced Mejia in a rematch, with the Wu Lin Feng World -67 kg title on the line, at Wu Lin Feng 2024: 12th Global Kung Fu Festival on January 27, 2024.

Aoqi faced David Mejia for the vacant Wu Lin Feng World -67 kg title at Wu Lin Feng 2024: 12th Global Kung Fu Festival on January 27, 2024. He won the fight by unanimous decision.

== Titles and achievements ==
=== Amateur ===
- 2011 ASEAN Martial Arts Festival Sanda Championships (gold)
- 2013 National Muay Thai Championships in Kunshan (gold)
- 2014 National Muay Thai Championships (bronze)
- 2014 National Wushu Sanda Championship 3rd place -70 kg (bronze)
- 2016 Second National Wushu Sports Conference Champion -70 kg (gold)
- 2016 National Wushu Sanda Championship 3rd place -70 kg (bronze)
- 2017 National Wushu Sanda Championship Champion -70 kg (gold)

=== Professional ===
- 2019 Wu Lin Feng World Cup -67 kg Champion
- 2024 Wu Lin Feng World −67 kg Champion

Ranking

- N°1 Combat Press.com at Super Featherweight, April, 2023

== Fight record ==
Kickboxing record
33 wins (7 (T)KOs), 11 losses, 0 draws
Date	Result	Opponent	Event	Location	Method	Round	Time
2024-01-27	Win	(Colombia) David Mejia	Wu Lin Feng 2024: 12th Global Kung Fu Festival	Tangshan, China	Decision (unanimous)	5	3:00
Wins the vacant Wu Lin Feng 67kg World title
2023-06-24	Loss	(Colombia) David Mejia	Wu Lin Feng 539	Tangshan, China	Decision	3	3:00
2022-09-24	Win	(Thailand) Wacharalek Or.Kwanmuang	Wu Lin Feng 531	Zhengzhou, China	Decision (unanimous)	3	3:00
2022-07-09	Win	(China) Meng Gaofeng	Wu Lin Feng x Huya Kung Fu Carnival 6	Zhengzhou, China	Decision (unanimous)	3	3:00
2021-11-27	Win	(China) Wei Ninghui	Wu Lin Feng 2021: World Contender League 7th Stage Contender League Semi-final	Zhengzhou, China	Decision (unanimous)	3	3:00
2021-09-30	Win	(China) Wang Pengfei	Wu Lin Feng 2021: World Contender League 6th Stage	Zhengzhou, China	Decision (unanimous)	3	3:00
2021-07-03	Win	(China) Er Kang	Wu Lin Feng 2021: World Contender League 5th Stage	Zhengzhou, China	Decision (unanimous)	3	3:00
2021-05-29	Win	(China) Hu Yafei	Wu Lin Feng 2021: World Contender League 4th Stage	Zhengzhou, China	Decision	3	3:00
2021-01-23	Loss	(China) Liu Xiangming	Wu Lin Feng 2021: Global Kung Fu Festival, -67 kg Tournament Semi-final	Macao, China	Decision (unanimous)	3	3:00
2021-01-23	Win	(China) Ji Xiang	Wu Lin Feng 2021: Global Kung Fu Festival, -67 kg Tournament Quarter-final	Macao, China	Decision (unanimous)	3	3:00
2020-11-28	Loss	(China) Ji Xiang	Wu Lin Feng 2020: China 70kg Championship Tournament	Zhengzhou, China	KO (high knee)	2	
2020-09-23	Loss	(China) Wei Rui	Wu Lin Feng 2020: King's Super Cup 5th Group Stage	Zhengzhou, China	Decision (unanimous)	3	3:00
2020-06-13	Loss	(China) Liu Xiangming	Wu Lin Feng 2020: King's Super Cup 2nd Group Stage	Zhengzhou, China	TKO (right head kick)	2	
2020-05-15	Win	(China) Wang Pengfei	Wu Lin Feng 2020: King's Super Cup 1st Group Stage	Zhengzhou, China	Decision (split)	3	3:00
2020-01-11	Win	(Thailand) Petchtanong Banchamek	Wu Lin Feng 2020: WLF World Cup 2019-2020 Final, Final	Zhuhai, China	Decision (unanimous)	3	3:00
Wins the 2019 Wu Lin Feng World Cup -67kg title.
2020-01-11	Win	(Thailand) Tawanchai PK Saenchaimuaythaigym	Wu Lin Feng 2020: WLF World Cup 2019-2020 Final, Semi-final	Zhuhai, China	TKO (punches)	2	0:50
2019-10-26	Win	(China) Wei Ninghui	Wu Lin Feng 2019: WLF -67kg World Cup 2019-2020 5th Group Stage	Zhengzhou, China	Decision (unanimous)	3	3:00
2019-08-31	Win	(Morocco) Ilias Bulaid	Wu Lin Feng 2019: WLF -67kg World Cup 2019-2020 3rd Group Stage	Zhengzhou, China	Ext.R decision (unanimous)	4	3:00
2019-06-29	Win	(Morocco) Hamza Essalih	Wu Lin Feng 2019: WLF -67kg World Cup 2019-2020 1st Group Stage	Zhengzhou, China	TKO (doctor stoppage)	2	0:17
2019-05-27	Win	(China) Jia Daobo	ONE Hero Series May	Beijing, China	KO (body shots)	2	1:49
2019-03-09	Win	(Belarus) Pavel Grishanovich	All Star Fight	Bangkok, Thailand	KO	2	1:49
2018-12-15	Loss	(Ukraine) Sergey Kulyaba	Kunlun Fight 79 – 66 kg Tournament, Quarter-finals	China	Decision (unanimous)	3	3:00
2018-11-01	Win	(Brazil) Steven	Sanda Premier League	China	Decision (unanimous)	3	3:00
2018-07-28	Win	(Tajikistan) Audi		Rushan, Shandong, China	KO (body punches)	1	1:40
2018-07-07	Win	(China) Meng Qinghao	Wu Lin Feng 2018: WLF -67kg World Cup 2018-2019 1st round	Zhengzhou, China	Decision (unanimous)	3	3:00
2018-06-20	Win	(China) Zhao Yaguang		China	Decision	3	3:00
2018-04-01	Loss	(China) Zhang Chunyu	Kunlun Fight 71	China	Extra round decision	4	3:00
2018	Win	(Armenia) David	Kung Fu Wang Zhongwang	China	Decision	3	3:00
2017	Win	(Belarus) Firat	Kung Fu Wang Zhongwang	China	Decision	3	3:00
2017-07-15	Loss	(Japan) Kenta	Kunlun Fight 64	China	KO (right hook)	2	1:45
2017	Loss	(China) Li Yinggang	Kung Fu Wang Zhongwang	China	TKO (arm injury)	1	
2016-12-23	Loss	(Russia) Aleksei Ulianov	Wu Fight	China	Decision	3	3:00
2016-07-16	Win	(China) Liu Bing	Sanda Premier League	China	Decision	3	3:00
2016	Loss	(China) Meng Qinghao	Sanda Premier League	China	Decision (unanimous)	3	3:00
2016-01-16	Win	(Thailand) Saksurin Kitayonygut	Hero Legends	China	Decision	3	3:00
2015-10-31	Win	(Russia) Vlad Tuinov	Kunlun Fight 33	Changde, China	Decision (split)	3	3:00
2015-05-03	Win	(France) Rafi Singpatong	Legend Of Victor	Shanghai, China	Decision (majority)	3	3:00
Legend: Win Loss Draw/no contest Notes

== See also ==
- List of male kickboxers
