= 2019 in Wu Lin Feng =

Chinese kickboxing events

Information
- First date: January 02
- Last date: N/A

Events
- Total events: N/A

Fights

Chronology
2018 in Wu Lin Feng	2019 in Wu Lin Feng	2020 in Wu Lin Feng

The year 2019 is the 16th year in the history of the Wu Lin Feng, a Chinese kickboxing promotion.

== List of events ==
No.	Event	Date	Venue	City
17	Wu Lin Feng 2019: WLF -67kg World Cup 2019-2020 6th Group Stage	November 30, 2019		Zhengzhou, China
16	Wu Lin Feng 2019: WLF -67kg World Cup 2019-2020 5th Group Stage	October 26, 2019		Zhengzhou, China
15	Wu Lin Feng 2019: WLF in Manila	October 23, 2019		Manila, Philippines
14	Wu Lin Feng 2019: WLF -67kg World Cup 2019-2020 4th Group Stage	September 28, 2019		Zhengzhou, China
13	Wu Lin Feng 2019: WLF China vs Russia	September 20, 2019		Moscow, Russia
12	Wu Lin Feng 2019: WLF at Lumpinee - China vs Thailand	September 6, 2019	Lumpinee Stadium	Bangkok, Thailand
11	Wu Lin Feng 2019: WLF -67kg World Cup 2019-2020 2nd Group Stage	July 27, 2019		Zhengzhou, China
10	Wu Lin Feng 2019: WLF x Krush 103 - China vs Japan	July 21, 2019	Korakuen Hall	Tokyo, Japan
9	Wu Lin Feng 2019: WLF -67kg World Cup 2019-2020 1st Group Stage	June 29, 2019		Zhengzhou, China
8	Wu Lin Feng 2019: WLF China vs Canada & 70kg World Championship Tournament	May 25, 2019	Henan TV Studio 8	Zhengzhou, China
7	Wu Lin Feng 2019: WLF -63kg Championship World Tournament	April 27, 2019		Zhuhai, China
6	Wu Lin Feng 2019: WLF China vs Estonia	April 13, 2019		Tallinn, Estonia
5	Wu Lin Feng 2019: WLF x Lumpinee - China vs Thailand	March 30, 2019		Zhengzhou, China
4	Wu Lin Feng 2019: WLF x Gods of War XII - China vs Greece	March 24, 2019		Athens, Greece
3	Wu Lin Feng 2019: WLF Championship in Zhengzhou	February 23, 2019		Zhengzhou, China
2	Wu Lin Feng 2019: WLF World Cup 2018-2019 Final	January 19, 2019		Haikou, China
1	Wu Lin Feng 2019: WLF -65kg World Championship Tournament	January 2, 2019	Hengqin International Tennis Center	Zhuhai, China

== Wu Lin Feng 2019: WLF -65kg World Championship Tournament ==
Wu Lin Feng 2019: WLF -65kg World Championship Tournament
- Promotion: Wu Lin Feng
- Date: January 2, 2019
- City: Zhuhai, China

Wu Lin Feng 2019: WLF -65 kg World Tournament was a kickboxing event held on January 2, 2019 in Zhuhai, China.

=== Results ===
Main Event
Weight Class				Method	Round	Time	Notes
Kickboxing -65 kg	(China) Wang Pengfei	def.	(Portugal) Diego Freitas	Decision (Unanimous)	3	3:00	WLF -65 kg World Tournament Final
Kickboxing -79 kg	(China) Fu Gaofeng	def.	(Guinea-Bissau) Januda Cruz	KO (Punches)	1
Kickboxing -91 kg	(China) Hao Gunghua	def.	(Spain) David Trallero	Ext.R Decision (Unanimous)	4	3:00
Kickboxing -67 kg	(China) Ji Xiang	def.	(Morocco) Abdelatif Badi	KO (High Knee)	2	3:00
Kickboxing -65 kg	(Portugal) Diego Freitas	def.	(Germany) Dennis Wosik	Decision	3	3:00	WLF -65 kg World Tournament Semi Final
Kickboxing -65 kg	(China) Wang Pengfei	def.	(China) Lu Jun	Decision (Unanimous)	3	3:00	WLF -65 kg World Tournament Semi Final
Kickboxing -80 kg	(China) Liu Dacheng	def.	(Belarus) Pavel Turuk	TKO (Doctor Stoppage)	3	1:30
Kickboxing Women -58 kg	(Denmark) Lea Pedersen	def.	(China) Yang Yang	Decision	3	3:00
Kickboxing -65 kg	(China) Lu Jun	def.	(Thailand) Thaksinlek Kiatniwat	Decision	3	3:00	WLF -65 kg World Tournament Quarter Final
Kickboxing -65 kg	(China) Wang Pengfei	def.	(Morocco) Hamza Essalih	Ext.R Decision	4	3:00	WLF -65 kg World Tournament Quarter Final
Kickboxing -65 kg	(Germany) Dennis Wosik	def.	(China) Meng Guaodong	Ext.R Decision	4	3:00	WLF -65 kg World Tournament Quarter Final
Kickboxing -65 kg	(Portugal) Diego Freitas	def.	(China) Pan Jiayun	Decision	3	3:00	WLF -65 kg World Tournament Quarter Final
Kickboxing -65 kg	(China) Hu Zehng	def.	(China) Li Xin	Decision	3	3:00	WLF -65 kg World Tournament Reserve Fight
Kickboxing -60 kg	(China) Cao Zuoyan	def.	(China) Tian Shaomi	Decision	3	3:00
Kickboxing -60 kg	(China) Li Yuankun	def.	(China) Tian Zongyao	Decision	3	3:00

== Wu Lin Feng 2019: WLF World Cup 2018-2019 Final ==
Wu Lin Feng 2019: WLF World Cup 2018-2019 Final
- Promotion: Wu Lin Feng
- Date: January 19, 2019
- City: Haikou, China

Wu Lin Feng 2019: WLF World Cup 2018-2019 Final was a kickboxing event held on January 19, 2019 in Haikou, China.

=== Results ===
Main Event
Weight Class				Method	Round	Time	Notes
Kickboxing -67 kg	(Thailand) Petchtanong Banchamek	def.	(Thailand) Jomthong Chuwattana	Decision (Unanimous)	3	3:00	WLF World Cup -67 kg Final
Kickboxing -60 kg	(Japan) Hirotaka Asahisa (c)	def.	(China) Wang Junyu	KO (Flying Knee)	4		WLF -60 kg Championship Match
Kickboxing -70 kg	(China) Song Shaoqiu	def.	(Belarus) Artur Isayans	Ext.R Decision	4	3:00
Kickboxing -67 kg	(Thailand) Petchtanong Banchamek	def.	(China) Yang Zhuo	Decision (Unanimous)	3	3:00	WLF World Cup -67 kg Semi Final
Kickboxing -67 kg	(Thailand) Jomthong Chuwattana	def.	(Turkey) Hasan Toy	Decision (Unanimous)	3	3:00	WLF World Cup -67 kg Semi Final
Kickboxing -67 kg	(Spain) David Mejia	def.	(China) Ji Xiang	Decision (Unanimous)	3	3:00
Kickboxing -70 kg	(China) Dong Wenfei	def.	(Romania) Alex Bublea	TKO	1
Kickboxing -70 kg	(Belgium) Mbamba Cauwenbergh	def.	(China) Fu Gaofeng	Decision (Unanimous)	3	3:00
Kickboxing -60 kg	(China) Zhao Chongyang	def.	(Spain) Jorge Varela	Decision	3	3:00
Kickboxing -63 kg	(China) Jin Ying	def.	(Thailand) Petkriankrab Tor.Silachai	Decision (Unanimous)	3	3:00
Kickboxing -60 kg	(China) Zhang Lanpei	def.	(Japan) Yuki Miwa	Decision (Unanimous)	3	3:00
Kickboxing -58 kg	(Russia) Khavazh Oligov	def.	(China) Jiduo Yibu	Decision (Unanimous)	3	3:00
Kickboxing -90 kg	(China) Guo Huanghua	vs.	(Russia) Alexei Dmitriev	Decision	3	3:00
Kickboxing -65 kg	(China)	vs.	(Greece)

== Wu Lin Feng 2019: WLF Championship in Zhengzhou ==
Wu Lin Feng 2019: WLF Championship in Zhengzhou
- Promotion: Wu Lin Feng
- Date: February 23, 2019
- City: Zhengzhou, China

Wu Lin Feng 2019: WLF Championship in Zhengzhou was a kickboxing event held on February 23, 2019 in Zhengzhou, China.

=== Results ===
Main Event
Weight Class				Method	Round	Time	Notes
Muay Thai -70 kg	(China) Bi Xinxin	def.	(Thailand) Krumram Jakkapong	Decision	3	3
Kickboxing -81 kg	(China) Liu Dacheng	def.	(Madagascar) Mahery Rakotonirina	Decision	3	3:00
Kickboxing -65 kg	(China) Wang Zhiwei	def.	(Russia) Ruslan Salmanov	TKO (Body Kick)	2	1:15
Kickboxing -63 kg	(China) Jin Ying	def.	(Spain) Nicolas Gaffie	Decision (Unanimous)	3	3:00
Kickboxing Women -60 kg	(China) Yang Yang	def.	(Japan) Rikako Sakurai	Decision (Unanimous)	3	3:00
Kickboxing -70 kg	(Netherlands) Michel Lammers	def.	(China) Hu Yafei	Decision (Unanimous)	3	3:00
Kickboxing -66 kg	(China) Wang Wanli	def.	(Papua New Guinea) Jonathan Tuhu	Decision (Unanimous)	3	3:00
Kickboxing -63 kg	(China) Zhu Shuai	def.	(Spain) Cedric Da Silva	TKO (3 Knockdowns)	1
Kickboxing -70 kg	(China) Zhang Mengfei	vs.	(Russia) Nikita Gerasimovich
Kickboxing -65 kg	(China) Liu Yong	vs.	(Mongolia) Batjargal Sandui
Kickboxing -65 kg	(China) Li Chinrui	vs.	(Russia) Kazbek Alisultanov
Kickboxing -57 kg	(Japan) Takahito Niimi	def.	(China) Yue Heng	KO	2
Kickboxing -70 kg	(China) Wang Quan	vs.	(China) Wang Guicheng

== Wu Lin Feng 2019: WLF x Gods of War XII - China vs Greece ==
Wu Lin Feng 2019: WLF x Gods of War XII - China vs Greece
- Promotion: Wu Lin Feng
- Date: March 24, 2019
- City: Athens, Greece

Wu Lin Feng 2019: WLF x Gods of War XII - China vs Greece was a kickboxing event held on March 24, 2019 in Athens, Greece.

=== Results ===
Main Event
Weight Class				Method	Round	Time	Notes
Kickboxing -71 kg	(Greece) Giannis Boukis	def.	(China) Zhong Weipeng	Decision (Unanimous)	3	3:00	WLF & ISKA Intercontinental -71 kg title
Kickboxing -81 kg	(Greece) Giannis Sofokleous	def.	(China) Li Hui	Decision	3	3:00	WKU World -81 kg title
Kickboxing -70 kg	(Greece) Nikos Gkikas	def.	(China) Wu Xuesong	Decision (Unanimous)	3	3:00
Kickboxing -69 kg	(China) Ji Xiang	def.	(Greece) Dionysis Gkikas	Decision (Split)	3	3:00	WKU Intercontinental -70 kg title
Kickboxing Women -51 kg	(Greece) Fani Peloumpi	def.	(China) Zhu Qiogn	Decision (Unanimous)	3	3:00
Kickboxing -81 kg	(Greece) Nikos Tzotzos	def.	(China) Duoli Chen	Decision (Split)	3	3:00
Kickboxing -67 kg	(Greece) Stefanos Mpaglatsakos	def.	(China) Hu Yafei	Decision (Split)	3	3:00
Kickboxing -61 kg	(Greece) Aggelos Giakoumis	def.	(China) Zhao Chongyang	Decision (Unanimous)	3	3:00
Kickboxing -66 kg	(China) Wang Pengfei	def.	(Greece) Ilyas Mirdini	Decision (Unanimous)	3	3:00
Kickboxing -60 kg	(Greece) Olsjan Mesoutaj	def.	(China) Zhang Lanpei	Decision	3	3:00

== Wu Lin Feng 2019: WLF x Lumpinee - China vs Thailand ==
Wu Lin Feng 2019: WLF x Lumpinee - China vs Thailand
- Promotion: Wu Lin Feng
- Date: March 30, 2019
- City: Zhengzhou, China

Wu Lin Feng 2019: WLF x Lumpinee - China vs Thailand was a kickboxing event held on March 30, 2019 in Zhengzhou, China.

=== Results ===
Main Event
Weight Class				Method	Round	Time	Notes
Kickboxing -67 kg	(Thailand) Chujaroen Dabransarakarm	def.	(China) Liu Yaning	Decision (Unanimous)	3	3:00
Muay Thai -70 kg	(China) Bi Xinxin	def.	(Thailand) Singdam Chor.Salaachor	KO (Elbow)	2
Kickboxing -64 kg	(China) Wang Zhiwei	vs.	(Thailand) Diesellek MU.Den	No Contest	1
Kickboxing -66 kg	(China) Pan Jiayun	def.	(Thailand) Kisaweangmana	KO	1
Kickboxing -72 kg	(China) Wang Chao	def.	(Thailand) Talaytong Sor.Thanaphet	TKO	1	2:54
Kickboxing -62 kg	(China) Fang Feida	def.	(Thailand) Petchdam Petchkiatpetch	TKO (3 knockdowns)	1
Kickboxing -60 kg	(Thailand) Longoen Dabransarakarm	def.	(China) Wang Junyu	Decision (Unanimous)	3	3:00
Kickboxing -65 kg	(Brazil) Fabrício Andrade	def.	(China) Zhao Chuanlin	Decision (Unanimous)	3	3:00
Kickboxing -65 kg	(China) Liu Xiangming	def.	(China) Meng Guodong	Decision	3	3:00	WLF -65 kg Championship Contender Tournament, Final
Kickboxing -84 kg	(Netherlands) Marley Zwanenberg	def.	(China) Wang Zhiguo	KO (Knee to the Body)	2	2:17
Kickboxing -60 kg	(Iran) Javad Heidari	def.	(China) Li Yuankun	Decision	3	3:00
Kickboxing -65 kg	(China) Liu Xiangming	def.	(Korea) Chok Yeong Jae	Decision (Unanimous)	3	3:00	WLF -65 kg Championship Contender Tournament, Semi Final
Kickboxing -65 kg	(China) Meng Guodong	def.	(France) Karim Bennoui	Decision (Unanimous)	3	3:00	WLF -65 kg Championship Contender Tournament, Semi Final

== Wu Lin Feng 2019: WLF China vs Estonia ==
Wu Lin Feng 2019: WLF China vs Estonia
- Promotion: Wu Lin Feng
- Date: April 13, 2019
- City: Tallinn, Estonia

Wu Lin Feng 2019: WLF China vs Estonia was a kickboxing event held on April 13, 2019 in Tallinn, Estonia.

=== Results ===
Main Event
Weight Class				Method	Round	Time	Notes
Kickboxing -63 kg	(Estonia) Markko Moisar	def.	(China) Jin Ying	Decision	3	3:00
Kickboxing -80 kg	(Estonia) Hendrik Themas	def.	(China) Liu Dacheng	Decision	3	3:00
Kickboxing -73.5 kg	(China) Jiao Fukai	def.	(Estonia) Andres Oitsar	Decision	3	3:00
Kickboxing -77 kg	(Estonia) Maikel Astur	def.	(China) Bo Fufan	Decision	3	3:00
Kickboxing Women -57 kg	(China) Li Mingrui	def.	(Estonia) Astrid Johanna Grents	Decision	3	3:00

== Wu Lin Feng 2019: WLF -63kg Championship World Tournament ==
Wu Lin Feng 2019: WLF -63kg Championship World Tournament
- Promotion: Wu Lin Feng
- Date: April 27, 2019
- City: Zhuhai, China

Wu Lin Feng 2019: WLF -63 kg Championship World Tournament was a kickboxing event held on April 27, 2019 in Zhuhai, China.

=== Results ===
Main Event
Weight Class				Method	Round	Time	Notes
Kickboxing -63 kg	(Germany) Dennis Wosik	def.	(China) Fang Feida	Decision	3	3:00	WLF -63 kg Championship Tournament Final
Kickboxing -70 kg	(China) Zhang Ren	vs.	(Iran) Hossein Hosseinzadeh
Kickboxing -65 kg	(China) Zhao Chuanlin	def.	(Russia) Khaiam Khudoiberdiev	Decision	3	3:00
Kickboxing -63 kg	(Germany) Dennis Wosik	def.	(China) Jin Ying	Decision	3	3:00	WLF -63 kg Championship Tournament Semi Final
Kickboxing -63 kg	(China) Fang Feida	def.	(China) Wang Zhiwei	Decision	3	3:00	WLF -63 kg Championship Tournament Semi Final
Kickboxing -63 kg	(China) Zhao Boshi	def.	(Madagascar) Faray Randrianarivo	Decision	3	3:00	WLF -63 kg Championship Tournament Reserve Fight
Kickboxing -63 kg	(China) Wang Zhiwei	def.	(Russia) Nikkita Surovezhkin	Decision	3	3:00	WLF -63 kg Championship Tournament Quarter Final
Kickboxing -63 kg	(China) Fang Feida	def.	(Netherlands) Pascal Koster	Decision	3	3:00	WLF -63 kg Championship Tournament Quarter Final
Kickboxing -63 kg	(China) Jin Ying	def.	(Spain) Anas Mouktader	Decision	3	3:00	WLF -63 kg Championship Tournament Quarter Final
Kickboxing -63 kg	(Germany) Dennis Wosik	def.	(China) Zhu Shuai	Decision	3	3:00	WLF -63 kg Championship Tournament Quarter Final
Kickboxing -65 kg	(China) Hu Zheng	def.	(Australia) Ben Worsfold	Decision	3	3:00
Kickboxing -79 kg	(China) Fu Gaofeng	def.	(United States) Will Chope	Decision	3	3:00
Kickboxing -66 kg	(China) Wang Pengfei	def.	(United States) Jordan Marciano	KO (Punches)	2
Kickboxing -87 kg	(China) Zhou Wei	def.	(United States) Andrew Christian	KO (Body Punch)	2	1:10
Kickboxing -67 kg	(China) Wei Ninghui	def.	(Canada) Will Romero	Decision (Unanimous)	3	3:00
Kickboxing -61 kg	(China) Zhao Chongyang	def.	(United States) Steve Varela	KO (Punches & Knees)	1	2:01
Kickboxing -70 kg	(China) Zhang Wensheng	def.	(United States) Kary Allen	Ext.R Decision (Unanimous)	4	3:00
Kickboxing -60 kg	(Mongolia) Namjilmaa Baterdene	def.	(China) Li Yuankun	Decision (Unanimous)	3	3:00

== Wu Lin Feng 2019: WLF China vs Canada & 70kg World Championship Tournament ==
Wu Lin Feng 2019: WLF China vs Canada & 70kg World Championship Tournament
- Promotion: Wu Lin Feng
- Date: May 25, 2019
- City: Zhengzhou, China

Wu Lin Feng 2019: WLF China vs Canada & 70 kg World Championship Tournament was a kickboxing event held on May 25, 2019 in Zhengzhou, China.

=== Results ===
Main Event
Weight Class				Method	Round	Time	Notes
Kickboxing -70 kg	(Russia) Anatoly Moiseev	def.	(Greece) Giannis Boukis	KO (Spinning back kick to the body)	1		WLF 70 kg World Championship Tournament Final
Kickboxing -68 kg	(China) Ji Xiang	def.	(Portugal) Luis Passos	Decision (Unanimous)	3	3:00
Kickboxing -64 kg	(China) Li Lianbang	def.	(Japan) Yoshitsugu Wada	TKO (Punches)	1	1:45
Kickboxing -70 kg	(Russia) Anatoly Moiseev	def.	(Netherlands) Mitchel Lammers	TKO (Corner Stoppage)	1	3:00	WLF 70 kg World Championship Tournament Semi Final
Kickboxing -70 kg	(Greece) Giannis Boukis	def.	(Serbia) Dragan Cimeda	Decision	3	3:00	WLF 70 kg World Championship Tournament Semi Final
Kickboxing -70 kg	(Russia) Wang Jia Le	def.	(China) Liu Ji Xin	Decision	3	3:00	WLF 70 kg World Championship Tournament Reserve Fight
Kickboxing -70 kg	(Russia) Anatoly Moiseev	def.	(China) Zhang Weipeng	KO (Left Hook to the Body)	1	2:30	WLF 70 kg World Championship Tournament Quarter Final
Kickboxing -70 kg	(Netherlands) Mitchel Lammers	def.	(China) Wu Xuesong	Decision	3	3:00	WLF 70 kg World Championship Tournament Quarter Final
Kickboxing -70 kg	(Serbia) Dragan Ciemsa	def.	(China) Song Shaoqiu	Decision	3	3:00	WLF 70 kg World Championship Tournament Quarter Final
Kickboxing -70 kg	(Greece) Giannis Boukis	def.	(China) Wang Chao	Decision	3	3:00	WLF 70 kg World Championship Tournament Quarter Final
Kickboxing -68 kg	(China) Xie Lei	def.	(Canada) Warwick Fulke	Decision (Unanimous)	3	3:00
Kickboxing -81 kg	(China) Liu Dacheng	def.	(Canada) Timothy Lo	Decision (Unanimous)	3	3:00
Kickboxing -75 kg	(China) Li Hui	def.	(Canada) Derek Jolivette	Decision (Unanimous)	3	3:00
Kickboxing Women -57 kg	(China) Li Mingrui	def.	(Canada) Taylor McClatchie	Decision (Unanimous)	3	3:00
Kickboxing -67 kg	(China) Li XIn	def.	(Canada) Joey Dubeau	Decision (Unanimous)	3	3:00
Kickboxing -60 kg	(China) Wang Junyu	def.	(Canada) Daniel Sopa	Decision (Unanimous)	3	3:00
Kickboxing -57 kg	(China) Qiu Xaofei	def.	(Canada) Josimar Tulloch	KO (Right Hook)	1	0:30

== Wu Lin Feng 2019: WLF -67kg World Cup 2019-2020 1st Group Stage ==
Wu Lin Feng 2019: WLF -67kg World Cup 2019-2020 1st Group Stage
- Promotion: Wu Lin Feng
- Date: June 29, 2019
- City: Zhengzhou, China

Wu Lin Feng 2019: WLF -67 kg World Cup 2019-2020 1st Group Stage was a kickboxing event held on June 29, 2019 in Zhengzhou, China.

=== Results ===
Main Event
Weight Class				Method	Round	Time	Notes
Kickboxing -63 kg	(China) Wang Wanli	def.	(Russia) Kazbek Alisultanov	Decision (Unanimous)	3	3:00
Kickboxing -67 kg	(Thailand) Petchtanong Banchamek	def.	(China) Xie Lei	Decision (Unanimous)	3	3:00	WLF -67 kg World Cup Group A
Kickboxing -67 kg	(Morocco) Ilias Bulaid	def.	(China) Wei Ninghui	KO (Right Body Straight)	3	1:11	WLF -67 kg World Cup Group D
Kickboxing -67 kg	(China) Feng Lei	def.	(Thailand) Chujaroen Dabransarakarm	Decision (Unanimous)	3	3:00	WLF -67 kg World Cup Reserve Fight
Kickboxing -80 kg	(Russia) Alexander Stetsurenko	def.	(China) Liu Dacheng	Decision (Unanimous)	3	3:00
Kickboxing -67 kg	(China) Jia Aoqi	def.	(Morocco) Hamza Essalih	TKO (Doctor Stoppage)	2	0:17	WLF -67 kg World Cup Group D
Kickboxing -67 kg	(Japan) Yuya Matsumoto	def.	(China) Lu Jianbo	KO (Knee to the Body)	2	2:55	WLF -67 kg World Cup Group A
Kickboxing -58.5 kg	(China) Wang Junguang	def.	(Thailand) Longoen Dabransarakarm	Decision (Unanimous)	3	3:00
Kickboxing -65 kg	(France) Fabrice Delannon	def.	(China) Meng Guodong	Decision (Unanimous)	3	3:00
Kickboxing -70 kg	(China) Li Shiyuan	vs.	(Estonia) Andi
Muay Thai -70 kg	(China) Bi Xinxin	vs.	(United States) Nathan Ward
Kickboxing -65 kg	(Argentina) Tomi Barrios	def.	(China) Liu Mingxin	Decision (Unanimous)	3	3:00
Kickboxing -67 kg	(China) Song Jie	vs.	(China) Li Xiaolong

== Wu Lin Feng 2019: WLF x Krush 103 - China vs Japan ==
Wu Lin Feng 2019: WLF x Krush 103 - China vs Japan
- Promotion: Wu Lin Feng, K-1
- Date: July 21, 2019
- City: Tokyo, Japan

Wu Lin Feng 2019: WLF x Krush 103 - China vs Japan was a kickboxing event held on July 21, 2019 in Tokyo, Japan.

=== Results ===
Main Event
Weight Class				Method	Round	Time	Notes
Kickboxing -63 kg	(China) Zhu Shuai	def.	(Japan) Koya Urabe	KO (Right Cross)	1	0:55
Kickboxing -60 kg	(China) Zhao Chongyang	def.	(Japan) Kento Ito	KO (Flying Knee)	3	0:16
Kickboxing -65 kg	(China) Wang Pengfei	def.	(Japan) Kota Nakano	Decision (Majority)	3	3:00
Kickboxing -70 kg	(Japan) Daisuke Fujimura	def.	(China) Dong Wenfei	Decision (Unanimous)	3	3:00
Kickboxing -67 kg	(China) Zhang Chunyu	def.	(Japan) Kona Kato	Decision (Unanimous)	3	3:00
Kickboxing -60 kg	(Japan) Naoki Yamamoto	def.	(China) Wang Junyu	Decision (Unanimous)	3	3:00
Kickboxing -63 kg	(China) Wang Zhiwei	def.	(Japan) Shuji Kawarada	Decision (Unanimous)	3	3:00
Kickboxing -53 kg	(Japan) Junki Sasaki	def.	(Japan) Shuto Hagiwara	KO (Punches)	1	2:51
Kickboxing -63 kg	(Japan) Ryoga Matsumoto	def.	(Japan) Hisaki Higashimoto	Decision (Unanimous)	3	3:00
Kickboxing -57 kg	(Japan) Taishi Yamada	def.	(Japan) Yoshifumi Fujita	Decision (Unanimous)	3	3:00
Kickboxing Women -45 kg	(Japan) Miyuu Sugawara	def.	(Japan) Chan Lee	Decision (Majority)	3	3:00
Kickboxing -63 kg	(Japan) Takuma Tsukamoto	def.	(Japan) Riki Shimura	KO (Punches)	3	0:24

== Wu Lin Feng 2019: WLF -67kg World Cup 2019-2020 2nd Group Stage ==
Wu Lin Feng 2019: WLF -67kg World Cup 2019-2020 2nd Group Stage
- Promotion: Wu Lin Feng
- Date: July 27, 2019
- City: Zhengzhou, China

Wu Lin Feng 2019: WLF -67 kg World Cup 2019-2020 2nd Group Stage was a kickboxing event held on July 27, 2019 in Zhengzhou, China.

=== Results ===
Main Event
Weight Class				Method	Round	Time	Notes
Kickboxing -65 kg	(Brazil) Fabrício Andrade	def.	(China) Hu Zheng	Decision (Unanimous)	3	3:00
Kickboxing -79 kg	(China) Fu Gaofeng	def.	(United States) Will Chope	TKO (3 Knockdowns)	1	1:01
Kickboxing -67 kg	(Spain) David Mejia	def.	(China) Li Xing	Decision (Unanimous)	3	3:00	WLF -67 kg World Cup Group C
Kickboxing -67 kg	(Thailand) Tawanchai PK Saenchai	def.	(China) Zhang Wensheng	Decision (Split)	3	3:00	WLF -67 kg World Cup Group C
Kickboxing Women -56 kg	(China) Li Mingrui	def.	(Spain) Claudia Diaz	Decision (Unanimous)	3	3:00
Kickboxing -67 kg	(Moldova) Stanislav Renita	def.	(China) Hu Yafei	Ext.R Decision (Unanimous)	3	3:00	WLF -67 kg World Cup Group B
Kickboxing -67 kg	(China) Liu Yaning	def.	(France) Dylan Salvador	KO (Punches)	2	2:00	WLF -67 kg World Cup Group B
Kickboxing -67 kg	(China) Pan Jiayun	def.	(Romania) Adrian Maxim	Decision (Unanimous)	3	3:00	WLF -67 kg World Cup Reserve Fight
Kickboxing -65 kg	(China) Liu Xiangming	vs.	(Iran) Masoud Abdolmaleki
Kickboxing -80 kg	(Russia) Jamal Yusupov	def.	(China) Bo Fufan	Decision (Unanimous)	3	3:00
Kickboxing -68 kg	(China) Zhangren	vs.	(Russia) Arthur Gasparyan
Kickboxing -65 kg	(China) Zhao Chuanlin	vs.	(Mongolia) Sandui Batargal
Kickboxing Women -58 kg	(Portugal) Débora Évora	def.	(China) Yang Yang	Decision	3	3:00
Kickboxing -72 kg	(China) Lin Fanhiao	vs.	(Brazil) Fabiano Hawthorne
Kickboxing -60 kg	(China) Xue Shenzhe	vs.	(Mongolia) Namijlmaa Baterdene
Kickboxing -60 kg	(China) Li Yuankun	def.	(Japan) Yuto Saito	KO	1
Kickboxing -65 kg	(China) Wang Xin	vs.	(China) Shang Xifeng

== Wu Lin Feng 2019: WLF -67kg World Cup 2019-2020 3rd Group Stage ==
Wu Lin Feng 2019: WLF -67kg World Cup 2019-2020 3rd Group Stage
- Promotion: Wu Lin Feng
- Date: August 31, 2019
- City: Zhengzhou, China

Wu Lin Feng 2019: WLF -67 kg World Cup 2019-2020 3rd Group Stage was a kickboxing event held on August 31, 2019 in Zhengzhou, China.

=== Results ===
Main Event
Weight Class				Method	Round	Time	Notes
Kickboxing -67 kg	(China) Jia Aoqi	def.	(Morocco) Ilias Bulaid	Ext.R Decision (Unanimous)	4	3:00	WLF -67 kg World Cup Group D
Kickboxing -67 kg	(China) Wei Ninghui	def.	(China) Feng Lei	Decision (Unanimous)	3	3:00	WLF -67 kg World Cup Group D
Kickboxing -71 kg	(China) Song Shaoqiu	def.	(Georgia (country)) Lado Gabisonia	KO	1	1:15
Kickboxing -57 kg	(China) Wang Junguang	def.	(Spain) Jorge Varela	KO (Spinning Back Kick to the body)	4	0:47	Enfusion World -57 kg vacant title Match
Kickboxing -67 kg	(Thailand) Petchtanong Banchamek	def.	(China) Lu Jianbo	KO (Left Cross)	1	1:57	WLF -67 kg World Cup Group A
Kickboxing -63 kg	(Brazil) Fabrício Andrade	def.	(China) Jin Ying	TKO (Doctor Stoppage)	3
Kickboxing -67 kg	(China) Zhang Chunyu	def.	(Thailand) Teerachai	TKO (Punches)	2	1:45	WLF -67 kg World Cup Reserve Fight
Kickboxing -60 kg	(Iran) Ali Zarinfar	def.	(China) Xue Shenzehn	Decision (Unanimous)	3	3:00
Kickboxing -78 kg	(China) Zhang Yunlong	vs.	(Madagascar) Mahery Rakotonerina
Kickboxing -87 kg	(China) Zhou Wei	vs.	(Canada) Olivier Langloi
Kickboxing -80 kg	(Russia) Jamal Yusupov	vs.	(China) Liu Dacheng
Kickboxing -60 kg	(China) Zhao Chongyang	def.	(Netherlands) Pietro Doorje	KO	1		Enfusion World -60 kg vacant title Match
Kickboxing -75 kg	(China) Li Hui	vs.	(Georgia (country)) Iago Gedenidze
Kickboxing -64 kg	(China) Wang Wanli	vs.	(Japan) Ryuichi
Kickboxing -62 kg	(Thailand) Sisaeng Prempri	vs.	(China) Zhao Boshi
Kickboxing -60 kg	(China) Zhang Yong	vs.	(China)
Kickboxing -60 kg	(China) Zhu Runhu	vs.	(China) Liang Longyi

== Wu Lin Feng 2019: WLF at Lumpinee - China vs Thailand ==
Wu Lin Feng 2019: WLF at Lumpinee - China vs Thailand
- Promotion: Wu Lin Feng, Lumpinee Stadium Kiatpetch Promotion
- Date: September 06, 2019
- City: Bangkok, Thailand

Wu Lin Feng 2019: WLF at Lumpinee - China vs Thailand was a kickboxing event held on September 6, 2019 in Bangkok, Thailand.

=== Results ===
Main Event
Weight Class				Method	Round	Time	Notes
Kickboxing -68 kg	(Thailand) Captain Petchyindee Academy	def.	(China) Meng Qinghao	Decision	3	3:00
Kickboxing -66 kg	(Thailand) Rambo Petch Por.Tor.Aor	def.	(China) Wang Pengfei	TKO (Corner Stoppage/Injury)	1	3:00
Kickboxing -63 kg	(Iran) Sajad Sattari	def.	(China) Li Lianbang	Decision	3	3:00
Kickboxing -63 kg	(China) Fang Feida	def.	(Thailand) Rittidej Wantawee	Decision	3	3:00
Kickboxing -60 kg	(Thailand) Chaophraya Petch Por.Tor.Aor	def.	(China) Zhang Lanpei	Decision (Unanimous)	3	3:00
Muay Thai -67 kg	(Thailand) Superball Eminentgym	def.	(China) Tian Yuzhen	TKO (Middle Kick)	1
Muay Thai -70 kg	(Thailand) Mongkornkao Sithkeawprapol	def.	(China) Bi Xinxin	KO (Left Middle Kick)	3
Muay Thai -70 kg	(Thailand) Khunsuek Kiatjaroenchai	def.	(China) Zhuyong Xin	TKO (Doctor Stoppage)	1
Muay Thai -70 kg	(China) Xie Wei	def.	(Iran) Mahdi Lali	Decision	3	3:00
Muay Thai -60 kg	(China) Yang Ming	def.	(Iran) Taher Nadei	TKO	2

== Wu Lin Feng 2019: WLF China vs Russia ==
Wu Lin Feng 2019: WLF China vs Russia
- Promotion: Wu Lin Feng
- Date: September 20, 2019
- City: Moscow, Russia

Wu Lin Feng 2019: WLF China vs Russia was a kickboxing event held on September 20, 2019 in Moscow, Russia.

=== Results ===
Main Event
Weight Class				Method	Round	Time	Notes
Kickboxing -85 kg	(Russia) Artem Levin	def.	(China) Zhou Wei	Decision (Unanimous)	3	3:00
Kickboxing -70 kg	(Russia) Khayal Dzhaniev	def.	(China) Kai Huangbin	KO	2
Kickboxing -65 kg	(China) Liu Xiangming	def.	(China) Li Xiaolong	KO	1		China vs Russia 8-man Tournament Final
Kickboxing -81 kg	(Russia) Islam Murtazaev	def.	(Uzbekistan) Sher Mamazulunov	Decision (Unanimous)	3	3:00
Kickboxing -84 kg	(Russia) Andrei Chekhonin	def.	(Russia) Sergey Veselkin	Decision	3	3:00
Kickboxing -65 kg	(China) Li Xialong	def.	(China) Pan Jiayun	Decision	3	3:00	China vs Russia 8-man Tournament Semi Final
Kickboxing -65 kg	(China) Liu Xiangming	def.	(China) Hu Zheng	Decision	3	3:00	China vs Russia 8-man Tournament Semi Final
Kickboxing -79 kg	(China) Fu Gaofeng	def.	(Russia) Vadim Apsit	Decision (Split)	3	3:00
Kickboxing -72 kg	(Russia) Vadim Davydov	def.	(China) Wang Chao	Ext.R Decision	4	3:00
Kickboxing -65 kg	(China) Pan Jiayun	def.	(Russia) Alexander Ten	Decision	3	3:00	China vs Russia 8-man Tournament Quarter Final
Kickboxing -65 kg	(China) Li Xiaolong	def.	(Russia) Ivan Strigunov	KO	1		China vs Russia 8-man Tournament Quarter Final
Kickboxing -65 kg	(China) Hu Zheng	def.	(Russia) Nikita Suravezhkin	KO	3		China vs Russia 8-man Tournament Quarter Final
Kickboxing -65 kg	(China) Liu Xiangming	def.	(Russia) Farid Yadulayev	Decision	3	3:00	China vs Russia 8-man Tournament Quarter Final

== Wu Lin Feng 2019: WLF -67kg World Cup 2019-2020 4th Group Stage ==
Wu Lin Feng 2019: WLF -67kg World Cup 2019-2020 4th Group Stage
- Promotion: Wu Lin Feng
- Date: September 28, 2019
- City: Zhengzhou, China

Wu Lin Feng 2019: WLF -67 kg World Cup 2019-2020 4th Group Stage was a kickboxing event held on September 28, 2019 in Zhengzhou, China.

=== Results ===
Main Event
Weight Class				Method	Round	Time	Notes
Kickboxing -91 kg	(China) Hao Guanghua	vs.	(Belarus) Fedor Koltun
Kickboxing -67 kg	(Thailand) Tawanchai PK Saenchai	def.	(China) Ji Xiang	Decision (Unanimous)	3	3:00	WLF -67 kg World Cup Group C
Kickboxing -67 kg	(Spain) David Mejia	def.	(China) Zhang Wensheng	TKO (Corner Stoppage)	2	3:00	WLF -67 kg World Cup Group C
Kickboxing -67 kg	(Thailand) Chujaroen Dabransarakarm	def.	(China) Li Xing	Ext.R Decision (Unanimous)	3	3:00
Kickboxing Women -56 kg	(China) Li Mingrui	def.	(Serbia) Marina Spasic	Decision	3	3:00
Kickboxing -67 kg	(China) Liu Yaning	def.	(China) Hu Yafei	Decision	3	3:00	WLF -67 kg World Cup Group B
Kickboxing -67 kg	(Germany) Andrej Bruhl	def.	(Moldova) Stanislav Renita	Decision	3	3:00	WLF -67 kg World Cup Group B
Kickboxing -65 kg	(China) Meng Guodong	vs.	(Thailand) Tapsong Seekhab
Kickboxing -63 kg	(Germany) Dennis Wosik	def.	(China) Jiao Daobo	Decision	3	3:00
Kickboxing -60 kg	(Spain) Daniel Puertas Gallardo	def.	(Thailand) Phittaya	TKO	3	2:05	WLF -60 kg Contender Tournament Final
Kickboxing -78 kg	(China) Wang Hesong	vs.	(Madagascar) Mahery Rakotonirina
Kickboxing -63 kg	(China) Zheng Bo	vs.	(Russia) Khaiam Khudoiberdiev
Kickboxing -75 kg	(China)	vs.	(Georgia (country)) Iago Genenidze
Kickboxing Women -54 kg	(China) Yang Ruijie	vs.	(Ukraine) Viktoria Koroshko
Kickboxing -60 kg	(Thailand) Phittaya	def.	(China) Zhao Chongyang	Decision loss for Zhao missing weight	3	3:00	WLF -60 kg Contender Tournament Semi Final
Kickboxing -60 kg	(Spain) Daniel Puertas Gallardo	def.	(China) Zheng Junfeng	Decision (Unanimous)	3	3:00	WLF -60 kg Contender Tournament Semi Final
Muay Thai -71 kg	(China) Li Shiyuan	vs.	(Thailand) Petchmai Chor.Narongsak
Kickboxing -63 kg	(China) Zhang Jinhu	def.	(China) Cheng Jinyaun	Decision	3	3:00

== Wu Lin Feng 2019: WLF in Manila ==
Wu Lin Feng 2019: WLF in Manila
- Promotion: Wu Lin Feng
- Date: October 23, 2019
- City: Manila, Philippines

Wu Lin Feng 2019: WLF in Manila was a kickboxing event held on October 23, 2019 in Manila, Philippines.

=== Results ===
Main Event
Weight Class				Method	Round	Time	Notes
Kickboxing -79 kg	(Brazil) Jean Pereira	def.	(China) Fu Gaofeng	KO (High Kick)	1
Kickboxing -60 kg	(China) Li Ning	def.	(Thailand) Yodsanchai	Decision (Unanimous)	3	3:00
Kickboxing -60 kg	(China) Zhao Chongyang	def.	(France) Yannis Osamni	KO (Punches)	1
Kickboxing -67 kg	(China) Zhang Chunyu	vs.	(Sweden) Alex Welin
Kickboxing -87 kg	(China) Zhou Wei	vs.	(Iran) Mehrab Saneh
Kickboxing -65 kg	(China) Pan Jiayun	vs.	(Sweden) Yousef Gorgis
Kickboxing -65 kg	(China) Hu Zheng	vs.	(Russia) Dmitri
Kickboxing -60 kg	(China) Zhao Boshi	def.	(Greece) Spyro Besiri	KO
Kickboxing -68 kg	(China) Cai Huangbin	vs.	(Georgia (country)) Tofik
Kickboxing -67 kg	(China) Guo Wentao	vs.	(Iran) Javad Bigdeli

== Wu Lin Feng 2019: WLF -67kg World Cup 2019-2020 5th Group Stage ==
Wu Lin Feng 2019: WLF -67kg World Cup 2019-2020 5th Group Stage
- Promotion: Wu Lin Feng
- Date: October 26, 2019
- City: Zhengzhou, China

Wu Lin Feng 2019: WLF -67 kg World Cup 2019-2020 5th Group Stage was a kickboxing event held on October 26, 2019 in Zhengzhou, China.

=== Results ===
Main Event
Weight Class				Method	Round	Time	Notes
Kickboxing -92 kg	(China) Hao Gunaghua	def.	(Belarus) Karen Tumasian	TKO	1
Kickboxing -67 kg	(China) Jia Aoqi	def.	(China) Wei Ninghui	Decision (Unanimous)	3	3:00	WLF -67 kg World Cup Group D
Kickboxing -63 kg	(China) Zhu Shuai	def.	(China) Seurhoy Banchamek	Decision (Unanimous)	3	3:00
Kickboxing -65 kg	(China) Liu Xiangming	def.	(Thailand) Rambo Petch Por.Tor.Aor	TKO (Spinning Back Fist)	2
Kickboxing -67 kg	(Thailand) Petchtanong Banchamek	def.	(Japan) Yuya Yamato	Decision (Unanimous)	3	3:00	WLF -67 kg World Cup Group A
Kickboxing -67 kg	(China) Xie Lei	def.	(China) Lu Jianbo	Decision (Unanimous)	3	3:00	WLF -67 kg World Cup Group A
Kickboxing -60 kg	(Iran) Javad Heidari	def.	(China) Wang Junyu	Decision (Unanimous)	3	3:00
Kickboxing -60 kg	(Thailand) Chaophraya Petch Por.Tor.Aor	def.	(China) Xue Shenzhe	Decision (Unanimous)	3	3:00
Kickboxing -63 kg	(China) Fang Feida	def.	(China) Wang Zhiwei	Decision (Unanimous)	3	3:00	WLF -63 kg Contender Tournament Final
Kickboxing -65 kg	(China) Lu Xiaolong	def.	(Mongolia) Gantongtokh	Decision	3	3:00
Kickboxing -75 kg	(China) Ni Jun	def.	(Iran) Vakili Nima	KO (Low Kick)	2
Kickboxing -70 kg	(China) Wang Chao	def.	(Thailand) Mongkornkao Sithkeawprapol	Decision	3	3:00
Kickboxing -70 kg	(Portugal) Fabio Reis	def.	(China) Li Shiyuan	Decision	3	3:00
Kickboxing -63 kg	(China) Fang Feida	def.	(Thailand) Yodkhunpon	Decision	3	3:00	WLF -63 kg Contender Tournament Semi Final
Kickboxing -63 kg	(China) Wang Zhiwei	def.	(Spain) Jose Leon Roma	TKO (Punches)	3	1:30	WLF -63 kg Contender Tournament Semi Final
Kickboxing -65 kg	(Russia) Sergei Pogosian	def.	(China) Xu Yunhao	Decision	3	3:00
Kickboxing -65 kg	(China) Song Jie	vs.	(China) Meng Hao

== Wu Lin Feng 2019: WLF -67kg World Cup 2019-2020 6th Group Stage ==
Wu Lin Feng 2019: WLF -67kg World Cup 2019-2020 6th Group Stage
- Promotion: Wu Lin Feng
- Date: November 30, 2019
- City: Zhengzhou, China

Wu Lin Feng 2019: WLF -67 kg World Cup 2019-2020 6th Group Stage was a kickboxing event held on November 30, 2019 in Zhengzhou, China.

=== Results ===
Main Event
Weight Class				Method	Round	Time	Notes
Kickboxing -67 kg	(Thailand) Littewada Sitthikul	def.	(China) Hu Zheng	Decision (Unanimous)	3	3:00
Kickboxing -65 kg	(China) Wang Pengfei (c)	def.	(China) Liu Xiangming	Decision (Split)	5	3:00	WLF -65 kg Championship title fight
Kickboxing -67 kg	(China) Liu Yaning	def.	(Moldova) Stanislav Renita	Decision (Unanimous)	3	3:00	WLF -67 kg World Cup Group B
Kickboxing Women -56 kg	(China) Li Mingrui	def.	(Germany) Farida Okiko	Decision (Unanimous)	3	3:00
Kickboxing -67 kg	(Thailand) Tawanchai PK Saenchai	def.	(Spain) David Mejia	Ext.R Decision (Split)	4	3:00	WLF -67 kg World Cup Group C
Kickboxing -67 kg	(Thailand) Superball Eminentgym	def.	(China) Ji Xiang	Decision (Unanimous)	3	3:00	WLF -67 kg World Cup Group C
Kickboxing -60 kg	(China) Zhao Chongyang	def.	(Thailand) Chaophraya Petch Por.Tor.Aor	TKO (Punches)	1	0:35
Kickboxing -67 kg	(China) Xie Lei	def.	(Japan) Yuya Yamato	Decision (Unanimous)	3	3:00	WLF -67 kg World Cup Group A
Kickboxing -67 kg	(Portugal) Fabio Reis	DEF.	(China) Hu Yafei	Decision	3	3:00	WLF -67 kg World Cup Group B
Kickboxing -61.5 kg	(Iran) Ali Zarinfar	def.	(China) Zheng Junfeng	Decision	3	3:00
Kickboxing -70 kg	(Georgia (country)) Lado Gabisonia	def.	(China) Li Shiyuan	Decision (Unanimous)	3	3:00
Kickboxing -70 kg	(Serbia) Dragan Cimesa	def.	(China) Ouyang Feng	Decision	3	3:00
Kickboxing -65 kg	(China) Li Xin	def.	(Russia) Sergei Pogosian	Decision	3	3:00
Kickboxing -70 kg	(China) Song Shaoqiu	def.	(Japan) Hiroki Nakajima	Decision (Unanimous)	3	3:00
Kickboxing -63 kg	(China) Li Lianbang	def.	(Japan) Hideaki	KO
Kickboxing -66 kg	(China) Pan Jiayun	def.	(Japan) Shinya Sugihara	Decision	3	3:00
Kickboxing -60 kg	(China) Cheng Jinyaun	def.	(Spain) Cedric Da Silva	Decision	3	3:00
Kickboxing -65 kg	(China) Lu Qifei	vs.	(China) Meng Cheng

== Wu Lin Feng 2019: East vs West Series - China vs Canada ==
Wu Lin Feng 2019: East vs West Series - China vs Canada
- Promotion: Wu Lin Feng WAKO Canada
- Date: December 14, 2019
- Venue: Pan Am Sport Centre
- City: Markham, Ontario, Canada

Wu Lin Feng 2019: East vs West Series - China vs Canada was a kickboxing event held on December 14, 2019 in Markham, Ontario, Canada.

=== Results ===
Main Card
Weight Class				Method	Round	Time	Notes
Muay Thai -75 kg	(Canada) Devon Littleshield	def.	(China) Li Hui	Decision	3	3:00
Muay Thai -63 kg	(Canada) Dylan Lissene	def.	(China) Liu Dacheng	TKO	1	2:30
Muay Thai Women -54 kg	(Canada) Amy Reid	def.	(China) Feng Ruijie	Decision	3	3:00
Muay Thai -54 kg	(Canada) Josimar Tulloch	def.	(China) Qiu Xiaofei	KO (Knee to the body)	1	1:45
Muay Thai -67 kg	(Canada) James Georgiou	def.	(China) Yang Ming	Decision	3	3:00

== See also ==
- 2019 in Glory
- 2019 in K-1
- 2019 in Kunlun Fight
- 2019 in ONE Championship
- 2019 in Romanian kickboxing
