= Tie Yinghua =

Chinese kickboxer

- Born: January 9, 1993 (age 33); Zhongxiang, China
- Other names: Little Tiger (小虎)
- Nationality: Chinese
- Height: 1.74 m (5 ft 8 1/2 in)
- Weight: 67.0 kg (147.7 lb; 10.55 st)
- Style: Kickboxing
- Stance: Orthodox
- Fighting out of: China
- Team: Team Dadongxiang Fight Club

Kickboxing record
- Total: 75
- Wins: 61
- By knockout: 21
- Losses: 14

Tie Yinghua (Simplified: 铁英华 Traditional: 鐵英華) is a Chinese kickboxer who competes in the Wu Lin Feng and Glory of Heroes organizations. As of July 2019, he is ranked the #10 featherweight in the world by Combat Press.

== Championships and awards ==
- Wu Lin Feng
  - 2012 Wu Lin Feng 65 kg Champion
  - 2013 Wu Lin Feng 65 kg Champion
  - 2013 Wu Lin Feng 4-man Asia tournament runner-up
  - 2015 Wu Lin Feng 67 kg Champion
  - 2021 Wu Lin Feng Knockout of the Year (vs Liu Yaning)
- Glory of Heroes
  - 2018 Glory of Heroes 67 kg Champion

== Fight record ==
Professional Kickboxing Record
62 Wins (21 KOs), 14 Losses, 0 Draws
Date	Result	Opponent	Event	Location	Method	Round	Time
2023-11-25	Win	(Madagascar) Mickael Randrianiaina	Wu Lin Feng 1000th Broadcast Celebration	Tangshan, China	TKO (3 Knockdowns)	2	
2022-12-09	Loss	(Russia) Vladimir Shuliak	Wu Lin Feng 532	Zhengzhou, China	TKO (Corner stoppage)	3	
2021-09-25	Win	(China) Wei Ninghui	Wu Lin Feng 2021: WLF in Tangshan	Tangshan, China	Decision (Unanimous)	3	3:00
2021-07-03	Win	(China) Xu Jian	Wu Lin Feng 2021: World Contender League 5th Stage	Zhengzhou, China	Decision (Unanimous)	3	3:00
2021-01-23	Loss	(China) Wang Pengfei	Wu Lin Feng 2021: Global Kung Fu Festival, Semi Final	Macao, China	Decision (Unanimous)	3	3:00
2021-01-23	Win	(China) Liu Yaning	Wu Lin Feng 2021: Global Kung Fu Festival, Quarter Final	Macao, China	TKO (2 Knockdowns/Spinning wheel kick)	2	
2020-10-18	Win	(China) Liu Yaning	Wu Lin Feng 2020: King's Super Cup Final	Zhengzhou, China	Decision	3	3:00
2020-01-04	Win	(Thailand) Sawettapong	Glory of Heroes 45	Haikou, China	Decision	3	3:00
2019-09-29	Win	(Greece) Georgios Koulalis	Glory of Heroes 41	China	KO (Left Knee to the Body)	1	2:24
2019-06-22	Win	(Thailand) Kwangtung Sasiprapa	Glory of Heroes 39	Xinyi, Guangdong, China	Decision	3	3:00
2019-05-25	Win	(Spain) Fran Valderrama	Glory of Heroes 38: Shantou	Shantou, China	Decision	3	3:00
2018-09-15	Win	(Thailand) Singsuriya Sakchaichot	Glory of Heroes 34: Tongling	Anhui, China	KO	3	
2018-07-07	Loss	(Japan) Riki Matsuoka	Glory of Heroes 32: Huizhou	Guangdong, China	Decision	3	3:00
2018-05-26	Win	(Thailand) Singdam Kiatmuu9	Glory of Heroes 31	Beijing, China	KO (Spinning Hook Kick)	1	
2018-02-03	Win	(Canada) Gabriel Varga	Glory of Heroes: Chengdu	Chengdu, China	Decision (Unanimous)	3	3:00
2018-01-13	Win	(Belgium) Mohamed Hendouf	Glory of Heroes: Guangzhou	Guangzhou, China	Extra Round Decision	4	3:00
Wins Glory of Heroes 67kg title
2018-01-06	Win	(Thailand) Iquezang Kor.Rungthanakeat	Glory of Heroes: Chengdu	Chengdu, China	TKO (Knee)	1	
2017-07-16	Win	(Japan) Daiki Watabe	Glory of Heroes & Krush.77	Nanning, China	Decision	3	3:00
2017-06-16	Win	(Tajikistan) Zoomi Latif	Glory of Heroes: Shangyu	Shangyu District, China	KO (Punches)	2	
2017-05-20	Win	(Spain) Adonai Mederos	Glory of Heroes: Spain & Strikers League	Tenerife, Spain	Decision (Unanimous)	3	3:00
2017-03-25	Loss	(Russia) Korser Sergei	Rise of Heroes: Hengyang	Hengyang, China	TKO (Doctor Stoppage)	3	
2017-01-13	Win	(Brazil) Makyol Yurk	Glory of Heroes 6	Jiyuan, China	Decision (Unanimous)	3	3:00
2016-12-17	Loss	(Belgium) Muhammad Khanov	Rise of Heroes 5	Nanning, China	Decision (Split)	3	3:00
2016-10-29	Win	(Thailand) Tepthanee Winai	Rise of Heroes 3	Changji, China	Decision	3	3:00
2016-08-06	Win	(Denmark) Youssef Assouik	Glory of Heroes 4	Changzhi, China	Decision	3	3:00
2016-07-02	Win	(Belarus) Dmitry Varats	Glory of Heroes 3	Jiyuan, China	Extra Round Decision	4	3:00
2016-05-07	Loss	(Thailand) Kem Sitsongpeenong	Glory of Heroes 2	Shenzhen, China	Decision	3	3:00
2016-04-02	Win	(France) Fabio Pinca	Glory of Heroes 1	Shenzhen, China	Decision (split)	3	3:00
2015-11-13	Win	(United States) Jo Sittisak	WCK vs Wu lin feng - USA vs China	China	TKO	1	
2015-09-12	Win	(Japan) Nobuyuki Hoshino	Wu Lin Feng	China	KO (Spinning back kick)	2	
2015-06-06	Loss	(Belarus) Andrei Kulebin	Wu Lin Feng World Championship 2015 – 67 kg Tournament, Quarter Finals	Jiyuan, China	Decision	3	3:00
2015-06-06	Win	(Japan) Kohei Nishikawa	Wu Lin Feng World Championship 2015 – 67 kg Tournament, First Round	Jiyuan, China	Decision	3	3:00
2015-01-31	Win	(Russia) Khayal Dzhaniev	2015 WLF World Championship, Final	Chongqing, China	Decision (Unanimous)	3	3:00
Wins 2015 WLF World Championship 67kg title
2015-01-31	Win	(South Korea) Kim Dong Su	2015 WLF World Championship, Semi Final	Chongqing, China	KO (Spinning back fist)	1	2:40
2015-01-31	Win	(United States) Shane Oblonsky	2015 WLF World Championship, Quarter Final	Chongqing, China	Decision (Unanimous)	3	3:00
2014-12-27	Win	(Thailand) Sucham	Wu Lin Feng	Pingdingshan, China	Decision (Unanimous)	3	03:00
2014-12-19	Win	(Thailand) Anjapa Sukunlu	Wu Lin Feng	Weinan, China	Decision (Unanimous)	3	3:00
2014-11-21	Win	(Russia) Atu Sulanski	Wu Lin Feng	Xiaogan, China	Decision (Unanimous)	3	3:00
2014-11-16	Win	(Kenya) Kevin Miluka	Wu Lin Feng	Changsha, China	KO (High Kick)	2	1:59
2014-10-04	Win	(Brazil) Wade	Wu Lin Feng	Wenling, China	Decision (Unanimous)	3	3:00
2014-09-07	Win	(Brazil) Felipe	Wu Lin Feng	Karamay, China	Decision (Unanimous)	3	3:00
2014-08-30	Loss	(China) Yang Zhuo	Wu Lin Feng - 67 kg World Tournament Final	Hong Kong	Extra Round Decision	4	3:00
For the Wu Lin Feng 65kg title
2014-08-30	Win	(New Zealand) Samuel	Wu Lin Feng - 67 kg World Tournament Semi final	Hong Kong	Decision (Unanimous)	3	3:00
2014-07-18	Loss	(Thailand) Noppagao	Wu Lin Feng	Dingyuan County, China	TKO (cut)	1	
2014-06-14	Win	(Republic of Ireland) JJ Power	Wu Lin Feng	Dublin, Ireland	TKO (Punch and Knee)	2	1:55
2014-05-23	Win	(Japan) Mishima	Wu Lin Feng	Luoyang, China	TKO (Knee)	2	1:20
2014-05-10	Win	(Thailand) Tom Minners	Wu Lin Feng - Germany	Hamburg, Germany	Decision (Unanimous)	3	3:00
2014-02-16	Loss	(Thailand) Jomthong Chuwattana	MAX Muay Thai 6	Zhengzhou, China	Decision (Unanimous)	3	3:00
2014-01-18	Win	(South Korea) Kim Dong Su	2014 Wu Lin Feng World Kung Fu Festival	Xiangyang, China	Decision (Unanimous)	3	3:00
2013-11-27	Win	(Sweden) Sandberg	Wu Lin Feng	Anyang, China	TKO (Knee)	2	2:35
2013-11-22	Win	(Germany) Valdet Gashi	Wu Lin Feng	Langfang, China	Decision	3	3:00
2013-11-02	Win	(United States) Mohammad Navidini	Wu Lin Feng - Las Vegas V	Las Vegas, United States	TKO (Punch)	3	2:25
2013-08-30	Loss	(Czech Republic) Michael Krcmar	Wu Lin Feng - New Zealand IV	Auckland, New Zealand	Decision	3	3:00
2013-08-10	Win	(Thailand) Petchtanong Banchamek	MAX Muay Thai 3	Zhengzhou, China	Decision	3	3:00
2013-04-25	Win	(China) Gu Hui	Wu Lin Feng - Asia 65 kg Championship, Final	Zhengzhou, China	Decision	3	3:00
Wins Wu Lin Feng Asia 65kg title
2013-04-25	Win	(Thailand) Chukai	Wu Lin Feng - 65 kg Asia Championship, Semi Final	Zhengzhou, China	Decision	3	3:00
2013-03-31	Win	(Brazil) Andre Luis	Wu Lin Feng	Zhejiang, China	Decision	3	3:00
2013-03-09	Loss	(China) Xie Lei	Wu Lin Feng - Malaysia	Malaysia	Decision	3	3:00
2013-03-09	Win	(Malaysia) Ediey Selendang Kuning	Wu Lin Feng - Malaysia	Malaysia	KO (High Kick)	3	2:21
2013-03-01	Win	(Russia) 卓玛	Wu Lin Feng	Wu'an, China	TKO (Low kick)	2	0:45
2012-11-11	Win	(United States) Artem Sharoshkin	Wu Lin Feng III	Las Vegas, United States	Decision	3	3:00
2012-09-25	Win	(United Kingdom) Miles	2012 广源国际世界王者争霸赛	Hefei, China	KO (Punch)	1	0:40
2012-07-21	Win	(New Zealand) Hayden Todd	Wu Lin Feng - New Zealand II	Auckland, New Zealand	Decision	3	3:00
2012-06-23	Win	(Thailand) Changpuak Jetsada Pongtong	Wu Lin Feng	Foshan, China	Decision	3	3:00
2012-03-31	Win	(Japan) Sho Ogawa	Wu Lin Feng - Japan vs China	Zhengzhou, China	Extra Round Decision	4	3:00
2012-02-20	Win	(China) Wang Yang	Wu Lin Feng	Zhengzhou, China	KO (High Kick)	2	0:23
Wins the Wu Lin Feng 65kg title
2012-01-16	Win	(China) Liu Wei	Wu Lin Feng	Zhengzhou, China	Decision	3	3:00
2012-01-14	Win	(South Korea) Yin Hezhen	Wu Lin Feng - Hebi	Hebi, China	Decision	3	3:00
2011-12-24	Win	(China) Gu Hui	Wu Lin Feng	Zhengzhou, China	Decision	3	3:00
2011-11-12	Win	(New Zealand) Blake	Wu Lin Feng - New Zealand	Auckland, New Zealand	Decision	3	3:00
2011-09-10	Win	(New Zealand) Doug Higgins	Wu Lin Feng - Malaysia	Kuala Lumpur, Malaysia	KO (Side kick)	1	2:20
2011-06-18	Win	(China) Yu Zezhou	WBC MuayThai China Championship	Nanning, China	KO (Punch)	2	2:08
2011-04-16	Win	(China) Zheng Zhaoyu	Wu Lin Feng	Zhengzhou, China	Decision	3	3:00
2011-04-02	Win	(China) Xie Lei	Wu Lin Feng	Zhengzhou, China	Decision	3	3:00
2011-01-15	Loss	(China) Yang Wei	Wu Lin Feng	Zhengzhou, China	KO (Punch)	2	2:15
2010-08-14	Loss	(China) Zhao Feilong	Wu Lin Feng	Zhengzhou, China	Decision	3	3:00
Legend: Win Loss Draw/No contest Notes

Amateur Kickboxing Record
Date	Result	Opponent	Event	Location	Method	Round	Time
2012-05-20	Loss	(China) Ding Ning	2012 China Kickboxing Championships	Kaifeng, China	Decision	3	3:00
2012-05-20	Win	(China) Wang Pengfei	2012 China Kickboxing Championships	Kaifeng, China	Decision	3	3:00
Legend: Win Loss Draw/No contest Notes

== Mixed martial arts record ==
Professional record breakdown
1 match	1 win	0 losses
By knockout	1	0

Res.	Record	Opponent	Method	Event	Date	Round	Time	Location	Notes
Win	1–0	Aliaksei krepets	TKO	Glory of Heroes 35: Meishan	Oct 12, 2018	2	1:38	Sichuan, China	
