= EM Legend =

Chinese kickboxing organization

- Industry: Kickboxing and Muay Thai Promotion
- Headquarters: Chengdu, China
- Key people: Mei Jia Xiang (Founder)
- Owner: Sichuan Emei Legend Sports Event Management Co., Ltd.
- Website: https://www.facebook.com/EMLegendFight

EM Legend (EML) (Chinese: 峨眉传奇; pinyin: Éméi Chuánqí), is a Kickboxing and Muaythai fight promotion headquartered in Chengdu, Sichuan Province, China.

== History ==
The first event was held in Emei, China on June 6, 2014. In the first 5 years, EML organized more than 42 fighting events in China, Great Britain, New Zealand, Hungary and Thailand. EML has also co-hosted events with other promotions like Topking World Series, Thai Fight, King in the Ring, Superfight Series, Superfight Series Hungary and Krud Kun Khmer.

In 2020, EML organized three main fighting events, EM Legend 42 - Lingfen Station on January 5, EM Legend - Kangding Station on September 26, and then EM Legend 43 - Guanghan Station on November 28. The second event was held in Kangding (Chinese: 康定), a city located in the eastern part of the Gangzi Tibetan Autonomous Prefecture in Sichuan Province.

On October 22, 2023, the organization will reactivate, and the 'EM Legend 44' event will take place. In the main event, Yodwicha Por Boonsit defeats Liu Yunlong of China by unanimous decision.

The story continues in 2024 with two events. The first will take place in January under the name 'EM Legend 45', followed by 'EM Legend 46' in June. At both events, the Thai legend Yodwicha Por Boonsit will win the 'four-man' tournament.

On June 15, 2024, at the EM Legend 46 event held in Chongqing, China, Brazilian fighter Maria Eduarda defeated China’s Qi Qiulan by decision in her professional kickboxing debut.

China, 29th June 2024: FENGBAO Fight Club, in association with EM Legend, presented the ISKA Asian Championship Kickboxing. Zheng Junfeng faced Darafkan Behzad to contest the ISKA Asian Welterweight title (67 kg). Junfeng stopped Behzad in the second round with low kicks, capturing the title with a TKO victory.

From August 9 to August 25, 2024, the 'EM-Legend C-Level Tournament for Legendary Youth' was held in various cities across China. This prestigious event aimed to showcase young talent in the discipline of freestyle combat sports.

The 'Em Legend 47' is scheduled to take place on January 19, 2025, in Pengzhou, China. The event will include the finals of the 'Legendary Youth C-Level' series.

On January 19, 2025, the city of Pengzhou hosted the 47th ‘Em Legend’ combat sports gala, which featured 21 exciting matches. The event saw renowned international and Chinese fighters enter the ring, including Yodwicha, Fabio Loisi, Sukprajob, Kittichai, Emerson Bento, Wang Xin, and Qi Qiulan. Among the main highlights was the clash between the Thai Muay Thai champion Yodwicha and the Chinese fighter Wang Xin, which ended in a draw due to stricter rules. The centerpiece of the gala was the 61.5 kg world championship four-man tournament, where French fighter Fabio Loisi triumphed with his technical superiority, claiming the world championship belt.

EM-Legend 48 was held on May 17, 2025, in Ankang, Shanxi Province, China. The event featured several notable fighters, including Detrit Sathian Gym, Cai Zeping, and Gao Yuhang. The main event took place in the 73 kg weight class, where Han Feilong defeated Alikhan Abubakarov by technical knockout (TKO).

On July 6, 2025, EM Legend and the Krud Kun Khmer Federation jointly organized the China vs Cambodia 7 vs 7 Martial Arts Showdown at the Royal Army Sports Center in Phnom Penh, Cambodia. The event featured seven exciting bouts in which fighters from China and Cambodia showcased their skills. The final results were 2 wins, 3 losses, 1 draw, and 1 knockout loss.

On September 14, 2025, EM Legend 49 was held in Angkor Wat, Cambodia, in collaboration with the Krud Kun Khmer promotion. The event’s slogan was “Cambodia: Land of Peace.” The card featured seven Cambodian fighters facing seven Chinese opponents under Kun Khmer rules.

EM Legend 50 was a jubilee combat sports event held on October 7, 2025, organized by the Chinese promotion EM Legend in cooperation with the Cambodian Krud Kun Khmer organization. The event took place in Qionglai, Chengdu, China. The gala featured several notable fighters, including Cambodian athletes Pich Sambath and Lao Chetra, Chinese fighters Jiduo Yibu and Han Feilong, also known as the “Tai Chi Dragon,” as well as female competitor Qi Qiulan of China. In the main event, Thai fighter Yodwicha Por.Boonsit successfully defended his 70 kg championship title against Chinese challenger Luo Chao via first-round technical knockout (TKO).

On July 10, 2026, EM Legend 51 was held in Ankang, China. In the 63 kg semifinals of the Quanmin Dawutai youth series, Shi Shaohuai and Hao Jilong advanced to the final, where Shi Shaohuai emerged victorious to claim the annual Quanmin Dawutai 63 kg championship. In the international bouts, Gao Yuhang defeated Armenia's Hayk Vardanyan, while Iran's Amir scored a technical knockout (TKO) victory over Li Jiulong. In the women's bout, Zahra Ghahremani defeated Qi Qiulan by decision. Meng Guodong also earned a victory over Turkey's Soheil Davoodi. In the main event, reigning champion Yodwicha faced challenger Han Wenbao for the EM Legend 70 kg Intercontinental Championship. After five rounds, Han Wenbao defeated Yodwicha by decision to capture the EM Legend 70 kg Intercontinental Championship.

On August 16, 2026, at the Emei Legend Elite – International Kings' Battle event in Qinhuangdao, China, Li Hao, Kunlun Fight professional league champion and ISKA national and intercontinental champion, defeated Moroccan national kickboxing champion Saad El Otmani by TKO in the second round following a body shot.

== Events ==
Event	Date	Venue	Location
EM Legend X WBC Muay Thai China - FIGHT FOR THE FUTURE	November 15, 2026		Guangzhou, Guangdong, China
Em Legend Elite – International Kings' Battle	August 16, 2026	Shijiangwan (Century Harbor)	Qinhuangdao, China
EM Legend 51	July 10, 2026	Ankang Gaoxin Changxing Comprehensive High School Gymnasium	Ankang, China
Em Legend & WKACN Intercontinental Championship	May 1, 2026	Chongqing Financial and Exhibition Center	Chongqing, China
EM Legend X	November 25, 2025	Pak Lok Golden Banquet International Banquet Hall	Hong Kong
EM Legend 50	October 7, 2025	Qionglai Gymnasium	Chengdu, China
Em Legend 49 (Krud Kun Khmer: Cambodia Land of Peace)	September 14, 2025	Angkor Archaeological Park	Angkor Wat, Cambodia
EM Legend vs Krud Kun Khmer Fighting Champion	July 6, 2025	Samdech Pichey Sena Tia Banh Sports Hall (Old Stadium)	Phnom Penh, Cambodia
Em Legend 48	May 17, 2025	Changxing Secondary Vocational School Gymnasium	Ankang, Shanxi province, China
Em Legend 47 and the Legendary Youth C-Level Final	January 19, 2025	Pengzhou Gymnasium	Pengzhou, China
EM-Legend B-level Game	December 14, 2024	Garze Prefecture National Sports Center	Kangding, China
EM-Legend Level C: Legendary Youth	August 24-25, 2024	Dongzheng Mixed Martial Arts Training Base	Shanghai, China
EM-Legend Level C: Legendary Youth	August 17-18, 2024	Xintian 360 Plaza	Zhengzhou, China
EM-Legend Level C: Legendary Youth	August 9-10, 2024	Feifan Fighting Training Base	Wuhan, China
EM Legend in association with FENGBAO Fight Club	June 29, 2024	Pengzhou Gymnasium	Chengdu, China
EM Legend 46	June 15, 2024	Chongqing Sports Hall	Chongqing, China
EM Legend 45	January 20, 2024	Pengzhou Gymnasium	Chengdu, China
EM Legend 44	October 22, 2023	Chongqing Sports Hall	Chongqing, China
EM Legend 43 - Guanghan Station	November 28, 2020	Deyang Convention Center	Deyang, China
EM Legend 42 - Shanxi Linfen Station	January 5, 2020	Linfen Sports Centre	Shanxi, China
EM Legend 41 - King in the Ring: Kings vs Legends	November 8, 2019	Eventfinda Stadium	Auckland, New Zealand
EM Legend 40 - Superfight Series Hungary	October 12, 2019	Messzi István Sports Hall	Kecskemét, Hungary
EM Legend 39 - Thailand Station	September 14, 2019	Koh Samui Festival	Koh Samui, Thailand
EM Legend 38 - Changxin Cup	August 17, 2019	Ankang New Area	Ankang, China
EM Legend 37 - Battle in Qingcheng	May 25, 2019	Dujiangyan City Gymnasium	Dujiangyan, China
EM Legend 36 - Shenzhen Pingshan Station	January 12, 2019	Pingshan Sports Centre	Shenzhen, China
EM Legend 34 / 35 - Emei Station	December 15, 2018	Emei Zhongxin Guoan Stadium	Emei, China
EM Legend 33 - New Zealand Station	August 31, 2018	Barfoot & Thompson Stadium	Auckland, New Zealand
EM Legend 32 - Chengdu Station	July 28, 2018	Sichuan Gymnasium	Chengdu, China
EM Legend 31 - Thailand Station (Co-Hosted with Topking World Series)	June 16, 2018	Surat Thani	Surat Thani, Thailand
EM Legend 30 - Emei Station	April 21, 2018	Emei Zhongxin Guoan Stadium	Emei, China
EM Legend 29 - Superfight Series London	March, 18, 2018	York Hall East London	London, England
EM Legend 28 - Guang'An Station (Top King World Series 17)	February 10, 2018	Guang An Stadium	Guang'an, China
EM Legend 27 - End of Year Finals Yunnan	January 20, 2018	Kunming Stadium	Kunming, China
EM Legend 26 - Emei Station	December 2, 2017	Emei Shan Gymnasium	Emei, China
EM Legend 25 - Sandu Station	November 18, 2017	Sandu Gulu Sightseeing Area	Sandu, China
EM Legend 24 - Emei Station	October 15, 2017	Emei Shan Gymnasium	Emei, China
EM Legend 23 - Yilong	September 29, 2017	Yilong County Gymnasium	Yilong, China
EM Legend 22 - Thailand Station (Co-Hosted with Topking World Series)	August 5, 2017	Su-ngai Kolok	Su-ngai Kolok, Thailand
EM Legend 21 - Chongqing Station (Co-Hosted with Topking World Series)	July 9, 2017	Chongqing Jiang Nan Stadium	Chongqing, China
EM Legend 20 - Emei Station	June 17, 2017	Emei Shan Gymnasium	Emei, China
EM Legend 19 - Jiangyou Station	May 27, 2017	Jiangyou Gymnasium	Jiangyou, China
EM Legend 18 - Dujiangyan Station	April 28, 2017	Dujiangyan City Gymnasium	Dujiangyan, China
EM Legend 17 - Emei Station	March 31, 2017	Emei Shan Gymnasium	Emei, China
EM Legend 16 - Xichang Station	February 25, 2017	Xichang City Gymnasium	Xichang, China
EM Legend 15 - End of Year Finals Emei	December 23, 2016	Emei Shan Gymnasium	Emei, China
EM Legend 14 - Emei Station	November 19, 2016	Emei Shan Gymnasium	Emei, China
EM Legend 13 - Emei Station (Co-Hosted with Thai Fight)	October 15, 2016	Emei Shan Gymnasium	Emei, China
EM Legend 12 - Emei Station	September 23, 2016	Emei Shan Gymnasium	Emei, China
EM Legend 11 - Dujiangyan (Co-Hosted with Topking World Series)	August 27, 2016	Dujiangyan City Gymnasium	Dujiangyan, China
EM Legend 10 - Nanchong Station	July 9, 2016	Nanchong Gymnasium	Nanchong, China
EM Legend 9 - Chengdu Station	June 5, 2016	Sichuan University Stadium	Chengdu, China
EM Legend 8	April 30, 2016	Meijiashan Stadium	Neijiang, China
EM Legend 7	April 2, 2016	Xichang City Gymnasium	Xichang, China
Em Legend 6	March 12, 2016	Xichang City Gymnasium	Xichang, China
Em Legend 5	January 30, 2016	Wenjiang District Gymnasium	Wenjiang, China
EM Legend 4	December 22, 2015	Zhuangshangcun Sunmugo Country Hotel	Panzhihua, China
EM Legend 3	August 8, 2015	Sports Hall of Shahe Campus, University of Electronic Science and Technology of China	Chengdu, China
EM Legend 2	April 24, 2015	Dujiangyan Gymnasium	Dujiangyan, China
EM Legend 1	June 6, 2014	Emei Shan Gymnasium	Emei, China

== Championship history ==
=== EM Legend Champions ===
Year	Weight	Champion	Runner-up	Event	Achievement
2015-08-08	60 kg	(China) Zhu Xu	(China) Chen Changlin	Em Legend 3	EM Legend 60 kg Tournament Champion
2015-12-22	60 kg	(China) Zhu Xu	(Belgium) Yassine Moutacim	EM Legend 4	EM Legend 60 kg Title Defense
2016-01-30	63 kg	(China) Zhang Chenglong	(China) Lei Penghui	Em Legend 5	EM Legend 63 kg Intercontinental Tournament Champion
2016-01-30	60 kg	(China) Zhu Xu	(Uzbekistan) Furkatbek Yokubov	Em Legend 5	EM Legend 60 kg Title Defense
2016-03-12	60 kg	(China) Zhu Xu	(China) Lan Mingqiang	EM Legend 6	EM Legend 60 kg Title Defense
2016-04-30	60 kg	(China) Zhu Xu	(Philippines) Marjo Borres	EM Legend 8	EM Legend 60 kg Title Defense
2016-06-05	65 kg	(New Zealand) Quade Taranaki	(Belarus) Ramil Novruzov	EM Legend 9	EM Legend 65 kg Tournament Champion
2016-06-05	63 kg	(Hungary) Antoine Habash	(China) Zhang Chenglong	EM Legend 9	EM Legend 63 kg Champion
2016-07-09	60 kg	(China) Zhu Xu	(Iran) Mohammad Javad Heidari	EM Legend 10	EM Legend 60 kg Title Defense
2016-07-09	65 kg	(Uzbekistan) Anvar Boynazarov	(Thailand) Kunchai	EM Legend 10	EM Legend 65 kg Tournament Champion
2016-09-23	63 kg	(Hungary) Antoine Habash	(China) Zhao Chuanlin	EM Legend 12	EM Legend 63 kg Title Defense
2016-10-15	60 kg	(China) Zhu Xu	(Thailand) Santi Phromsopha	EM Legend 13	EM Legend 60 kg Title Defense
2016-12-23	65 kg	(Thailand) Singmanee Kaewsamrit	(Japan) Rukiya Anpo	EM Legend 15	EM Legend 65 kg World King Tournament Champion
2016-12-23	60 kg	(Belgium) Mohamed Boulef	(China) Zhu Xu	EM Legend 15	EM Legend 60 kg Champion
2017-03-31	60 kg	(China) Zhu Xu	(China) Wang Wanben	EM Legend 17	EM Legend 60 kg Intercontinental Tournament Champion
2017-04-28	65 kg	(Uzbekistan) Anvar Boynazarov	(Ukraine) Igor Liubchenko	EM Legend 18	EM Legend 65 kg Tournament Champion
2017-05-27	63 kg	(Thailand) Kachoenram Aniwat	(Ukraine) Vladislav Yarmak	EM Legend 19	EM Legend 63 kg Intercontinental Tournament Championship
2017-05-27	60 kg	(China) Zhu Xu	(Thailand) Yushenchai	EM Legend 19	EM Legend 60 kg Title Defense
2017-09-29	75 kg	(Russia) Islam Murtazaev	(Thailand) Rungrawee KemMuaythaigym	EM Legend 23	EM Legend 75 kg World Tournament Champion
2017-10-15	67 kg	(Uzbekistan) Bobir Tagiev	(Russia) Dmitry Grafov	EM Legend 24	EM Legend 67 kg Tournament Champion
2017-12-02	63.5 kg	(Thailand) Kachoenram Aniwat	(China) Xie Yuhang	EM Legend 26	
2018-01-20	65 kg	(Thailand) Thodkhui MR Manas	(China) Zhang Chenglong	EM Legend 27	EM Legend 65 kg World King Tournament Champion
2018-03-18	70 kg	(United Kingdom) Vinny Church	(São Tomé and Príncipe) Fabio Barros	EM Legend 29	EM Legend 70 kg Tournament Champion
2018-08-31	63 kg	(Thailand) Pettawee Sor Kittichai	(China) Zhu Xu	EM Legend 33	WKA K-1 World Lightweight Champion
2018-08-31	70 kg	(China) Liu Lei	(New Zealand) Sam Haggitt	EM Legend 33	EM Legend 70 kg Tournament Champion WKA 70 kg Champion
2018-12-14	70 kg	(China) Ouyang Feng	(China) Zhou Lin	EM Legend 34	EM Legend 70 kg Tournament Champion
2018-12-15	63.5 kg	(China) Lu Jun	(Thailand) Kachoenram Aniwat	EM Legend 35	EM Legend 63.5 kg Champion
2019-01-12	60 kg	(China) Zhu Xu	(Japan) Taiga Kawabe	EM Legend 36	EM Legend 60 kg Title Defense
2019-01-12	63.5 kg	(China) Lu Jun	(Georgia (country)) Hohokhia Leri	EM Legend 36	EM Legend 63.5 kg Title Defense
2020-01-05	77 kg	(Thailand) Rungrawee KemMuaythaigym	(China) Bo Fufan	EM Legend 42	EM Legend 77 kg Champion
2023-10-22	61.5 kg	(China) Yang Ming	(Iran) Ali Zarinfar	EM Legend 44	EM Legend 61.5 kg Intercontinental Champion
2024-01-20	70 kg	(Thailand) Yodwicha Por.Boonsit	(China) Liu Lei	EM Legend 45	EM Legend 70 kg Continental Tournament Champion
2024-06-15	70 kg	(Thailand) Yodwicha Por.Boonsit	(Belarus) Dzianis Zuev	EM Legend 46	EM Legend 70 kg Intercontinental Tournament Champion
2025-01-19	61.5 kg	(France) Fabio Loisi	(China) Jiduo Yibu	EM Legend 47	EM Legend 61.5 kg World Champion
2025-10-07	70 kg	(Thailand) Yodwicha Por.Boonsit	(China) Luo Chao	EM Legend 50	EM Legend 70 kg Intercontinental Title Defense
2025-11-25	65 kg	(Japan) Yukiya Nakamura	(Hong Kong) Hu Jiahao	EM Legend X	EM Legend X 65 kg Asian Gold Belt Champion
2025-11-25	70 kg	(Hong Kong) Tse Kit Shing	(Thailand) Singmanee Kaewsamrit	EM Legend X	EM Legend X 70 kg Greater Bay Area Gold Belt Champion
2025-11-25	64 kg	(Brazil) Alber Macgyver	(China) Jiduo Yibu	EM Legend X	EM Legend X 64 kg Greater Bay Area Charity Belt Champion
2026-07-10	70 kg	(China) Han Wenbao	(Thailand) Yodwicha Por.Boonsit	EM Legend 51	EM Legend 70 kg Intercontinental Champion
2026-11-15	65 kg	(China) Hong Yunlai	(Hong Kong) Peng Yanchuang	EM Legend X	EM Legend X 65 kg Muay Thai Greater Bay Area Tournament Champion WBC Muay Thai 65 kg Greater China Champion
2026-11-15	67 kg	(Thailand) Aun Jomtrinoi	(China) Shu Jiexin	EM Legend X	EM Legend X 67 kg Muay Thai Greater Bay Area Champion
