= Denis Souza Jr. =

Brazilian kickboxer

- Born: Denis Da Silva De Souza Júnior; May 5, 1998 (age 28); Vila Velha, Brazil
- Other names: Denizinho
- Height: 174 cm (5 ft 9 in)
- Weight: 64 kg (141 lb; 10 st 1 lb)
- Style: Kickboxing
- Stance: Orthodox
- Fighting out of: Vitória, Espírito Santo, Brazil
- Team: Coliseu Fight Club
- Trainer: Dênis Souza

Kickboxing record
- Total: 19
- Wins: 17
- By knockout: 6
- Losses: 2
- By knockout: 0
- Draws: 0

Denis Souza Jr. is a Brazilian kickboxer. He is the reigning WGP Kickboxing Super-lightweight champion.

As of December 2025, he was the #8 ranked -64 kg kickboxer in the world according to Beyond Kickboxing.

== Career ==
Denis Souza Jr. started training in kickboxing alongside his brother Iury under the teaching of their father Denis Souza, the trainer for the national brazilian kickboxing team.

Souza made his professional debut on July 16, 2016, against Diego Piovesan at WGP Kickboxing #32. He lost the fight by split decision.

On February 24, 2024, Souza travelled to Abu Dhabi, UAE, to face Anthony Velay at UAM Fight Night K1-PRO. He won the fight by unanimous decision.

On August 17, 2024, Souza took part in a 4-man tournament at WGP Kickboxing 77. In the semifinals he defeated Alex Reis by unanimous decision. In the final he defeatedVinicius Mestrinier by unanimous decision to earn a title shot in the Super-lightweight division.

On June 28, 2025, Souza faced Matheus Pinokio at K-1 World MAX 2025 - South American Round. He won the fight by unanimous decision.

On October 25, 2025, Souza faced Leandro Miranda for a defense of his Prime Kickboxing Super-lightweight title at Prime Kickboxing 10. He won the fight by third round knockout with a flying knee.

On November 27, 2025, Souza challenged Tomás Aguirre for his WGP Kickboxing Super Lightweight title at WGP Kickboxing 83. He won the fight by unanimous decision after scoring a knockdown in the first round.

== Championships and accomplishments ==
=== Professional ===
- Prime Kickboxing
  - 2022 Prime Kickboxing Super Lightweight (-64.5 kg) Champion
    - Two successful title defenses
- WGP Kickboxing
  - 2025 WGP Super Lightweight (-64.5 kg) Champion

=== Amateur ===
- World Association of Kickboxing Organizations
  - 2023 WAKO World Championships K-1 -67 kg (silver)
  - 2023 Austrian Classics Kickboxing World Cup K-1 -67 kg (gold)
  - 2022 WAKO Pan American Championships K-1 -67 kg (gold)
  - 2022 WAKO International Turkish Open Kickboxing World Cup K-1 -67 kg (gold)
  - 2021 WAKO South American Championships K-1 -67 kg (gold)
  - 11x Brazil National Kickboxing Champion

== Fight record ==
Kickboxing record
17 Wins (6 (T)KO's), 2 Losses, 0 Draw
Date	Result	Opponent	Event	Location	Method	Round	Time
2026-12-18		(Thailand) Ferrari Fairtex	ONE Fight Night 50	Bangkok, Thailand			
2026-08-15	Win	(Russia) Dmitrii Kovtun	ONE Fight Night 46	Bangkok, Thailand	Decision (Unanimous)	3	3:00
2026-05-15	Loss	(China) Luo Chao	ONE Fight NIght 43	Bangkok, Thailand	Decision (Split)	3	3:00
2025-11-27	Win	(Argentina) Tomás Aguirre	WGP Kickboxing 82	Serra, Brazil	Decision (Unanimous)	5	3:00
Wins the WGP Kickboxing Super Lightweight (-64.5kg) title.
2025-10-25	Win	(Portugal) Leandro Miranda	Prime Kickboxing 10	Fortaleza, Brazil	KO (Flying knee)	3	2:25
Defends the Prime Kickboxing Super Lightweight (-64.5kg) title.
2025-06-28	Win	(Brazil) Matheus Pinokio	K-1 World MAX 2025 - South American Round	São José dos Pinhais, Brazil	Decision (Unanimous)	3	3:00
2024-08-17	Win	(Brazil) Vinicius Mestrinier	WGP Kickboxing 77 - Super 8 Challenger GP, Final	Brasilia, Brazil	Decision (Unanimous)	3	3:00
WGP Kickboxing Super Lightweight (-64.5kg) title eliminator.
2024-08-17	Win	(Brazil) Alex Reis	WGP Kickboxing 77 - Super 8 Challenger GP, Semifinal	Brasilia, Brazil	Decision (Unanimous)	3	3:00
2024-05-18	Win	(Brazil) Hiago Pereira	WGP Kickboxing 75 - Super 8 Challenger GP, Quarterfinal	Brasilia, Brazil	TKO (High kick)	2	
2024-02-24	Win	(France) Anthony Velay	UAM Fight Night K1-PRO	Abu Dhabi, UAE	Decision (Unanimous)	3	3:00
2023-10-28	Win	(Argentina) Marcos Rios	Prime Kickboxing 7	Fortaleza, Brazil	TKO (Spinning back kick)	2	3:00
Defends the Prime Kickboxing Super Lightweight (-64.5kg) title.
2023-04-29	Win	(Brazil) Alex Reis	WGP Kickboxing 69	Brasilia, Brazil	Decision (Split)	3	3:00
2022-07-23	Win	(Brazil) Hugo Caveira	Prime Kickboxing 5, Final	Caucaia, Brazil	TKO (retirement)	1	3:00
Wins the vacant Prime Kickboxing Super Lightweight (-64.5kg) title.
2022-07-23	Win	(Brazil) Rogério Sousa	Prime Kickboxing 5, Semifinal	Caucaia, Brazil	Decision (Unanimous)	3	3:00
2021-06-08	Win	(Brazil) Wanderson Batista	4° Desafio Coliseu Fight Club	Vitoria, Brazil	KO (Spinning back kick)		
2020-12-12	Win	(Brazil) Ramon Furtado	International Fighter's Meeting	Vitoria, Brazil	Decision (Unanimous)	3	3:00
2019-08-02	Win	(Brazil) Cabelo Monteiro	WGP Kickboxing #56	Buenos Aires, Argentina	Decision (Split)	3	3:00
2017-07-22	Win	(Chile) Felipe Artillero	WGP Kickboxing #39	Vitoria, Brazil	Decision (Unanimous)	3	3:00
2016-07-16	Loss	(Brazil) Diego Piovesan	WGP Kickboxing #32	Salvador, Brazil	Decision (Split)	3	3:00
Legend: Win Loss Draw/No contest Notes

Amateur Kickboxing record
Date	Result	Opponent	Event	Location	Method	Round	Time
2023-11-22	Loss	(France) Anthony Velay	2023 WAKO World Championship, Final	Albufeira, Portugal	Decision (3:0)	3	2:00
Wins 2023 WAKO World Championships K-1 -67kg Silver Medal.
2023-11-21	Win	(Finland) Lauri Suomela	2023 WAKO World Championship, Semifinals	Albufeira, Portugal	Decision (3:0)	3	2:00
2023-11-21	Win	(Portugal) Tiago Santos	2023 WAKO World Championship, Quarterfinals	Albufeira, Portugal	Decision (2:1)	3	2:00
2023-11-20	Win	(Mexico) David Betancourt	2023 WAKO World Championship, Second Round	Albufeira, Portugal	Decision (3:0)	3	2:00
2023-03-19	Win	(Moldova) Vladimir Filipov	2023 WAKO Austrian Classics Kickboxing World Cup, Final	Tyrol, Austria	Decision (3:0)	3	2:00
Wins 2023 Austrian Classics Kickboxing World Cup K-1 -67kg Gold Medal.
2023-03-18	Win	(Switzerland) Andre Lambrigger	2023 WAKO Austrian Classics Kickboxing World Cup, Semifinal	Tyrol, Austria	Decision (3:0)	3	2:00
2023-03-17	Win	(Finland) John Englund	2023 WAKO Austrian Classics Kickboxing World Cup, Quarterfinal	Tyrol, Austria	Decision (3:0)	3	2:00
2022-11-20	Win	(Mexico) David Betancourt	2022 WAKO Pan American Championship, Final	Cascavel, Brazil	Decision (2:1)	3	2:00
Wins 2022 WAKO Pan American Championships K-1 -67kg Gold Medal.
2022-11-19	Win	(United States) Jason Jones	2022 WAKO Pan American Championship, Semifinal	Cascavel, Brazil	Decision (2:1)	3	2:00
2022-05-15	Win	(Uzbekistan) Navruz Jumanazarov	WAKO 7th International Turkish Open Kickboxing World Cup, Final	Istanbul, Turkey	Decision (2:1)	3	2:00
Wins WAKO 7th International Turkish Open Kickboxing World Cup K-1 -67kg Gold Medal.
2022-05-14	Win	(Kazakhstan) Alikhan Ozdoyev	WAKO 7th International Turkish Open Kickboxing World Cup, Semifinal	Istanbul, Turkey	Decision (3:0)	3	2:00
2022-05-13	Win	(Turkey) Kubilay Tarhan	WAKO 7th International Turkish Open Kickboxing World Cup, Quarterfinal	Istanbul, Turkey	Decision (3:0)	3	2:00
2021-12-12	Win	(Bolivia) Renzo Martinez	2021 WAKO South American Championship, Final	Cascavel, Brazil	Decision (Unanimous)	3	2:00
Wins 2021 WAKO South American Championship K-1 -67kg Gold Medal.
2021-10-21	Loss	(Ukraine) Oleksandr Ukrainets	2021 WAKO World Championship, Second Round	Jesolo, Italy	Decision (2:)	3	2:00
2021-10-20	Win	(Austria) Gregor Rakousky	2021 WAKO World Championship, First Round	Jesolo, Italy	Decision (3:0)	3	2:00
Legend: Win Loss Draw/No contest Notes

== See also ==
- List of male kickboxers
