= Meng Gaofeng =

Chinese kickboxer (born 1996)

- Born: 孟高峰; December 9, 1996 (age 29); Zhoukou, China
- Height: 177 cm (5 ft 10 in)
- Weight: 65 kg (143 lb; 10.2 st)
- Style: Kickboxing
- Fighting out of: Liaoyang, China
- Team: Liaoning Innovation Fight Club

Kickboxing record
- Total: 52
- Wins: 38
- By knockout: 10
- Losses: 14

Meng Gaofeng (孟高峰, born December 9, 1996) is a Chinese kickboxer.

As of January 2022 he was the #8 ranked Featherweight kickboxer in the world by Combat Press.

== Career ==
On December 7, 2019, Meng made his Glory promotion debut at Glory 73: Shenzhen in a Featherweight tournament. In the semi-finals he beat Masaya Kubo by unanimous decision. In the final he lost to River Daz by split decision.
On December 25, Meng challenged Tang Yao at the Faith Fighting Championships 32 event for the Faith Fight China Professional League -67 kg title. He lost by decision.

On August 28, 2020, Meng faced Pan Jiayun in the final of the 2020 Wu Lin Feng China tournament. He won the fight by TKO in the first round scoring three knockdowns less than two minutes into the bout to capture the vacant IPCC China and Wu Lin Feng China -65 kg titles.

On January 1, 2022, Meng challenged Wang Pengfei for the Wu Lin Feng World -65 kg title. He won the fight by decision after five rounds.

Meng took part in a one-day eight-man Wu Lin Feng World -67 kg tournament, which was held at Wu Lin Feng 2023: Chinese New Year on February 4, 2023. He faced Diego Freitas in the quarterfinals. Although he was able to beat Freitas by unanimous decision, Meng lost the semifinal bout against Zhou Jiaqiang by decision.

On September 29, 2024, Meng took part in an 8-man one night one night tournament at K-1 World MAX 2024 for the vacant K-1 Super Lightweight (-65kg) title. In the quarterfinals he faced reigning WGP Kickboxing -6.kg champion Tomás Aguirre, he lost by unanimous decision after receiving an eight count.

== Titles and accomplishments ==
Amateur

- 2019 China Kickboxing Championships -67 kg (gold)

Professional

- Wu Lin Feng
  - 2020 Wu Lin Feng China -65 kg Champion
  - 2021 Wu Lin Feng World -65 kg Champion (one defense)
- International Professional Combat Council
  - 2020 IPCC China -65 kg Champion

== Kickboxing record ==
Professional kickboxing record
38 wins (11 (T)KOs), 13 losses, 0 draws
Date	Result	Opponent	Event	Location	Method	Round	Time
2026-11-21	Win	(Brazil) Alexandre Pereira	Red Fist Strike	Baise, China	Decision (Unanimous)	3	3:00
Defended the Red Fist Strike -67kg title.
2026-10-03	Loss	(Thailand) Buakaw Banchamek	MAX Muay Thai	Pattaya, Thailand	Decision	3	3:00
2026-06-06	Win	(Uzbekistan) Abos Bozorboyev	Wu Lin Feng Kung Fu Carnival Jingzhou	Jingzhou, China	TKO (referee stoppage)	3	1:02
2026-04-24	Loss	(Thailand) Buakaw Banchamek	T Fight All Star	Kuala Lumpur, Malaysia	Decision (unanimous)	3	3:00
2026-02-06	Win	(China) Liu Zhengyu	Red Fist Strike - 67 kg tournament, Semifinals	Baise, China	TKO (low kicks)	1	
Wins Red Fist Strike -67kg title.
2026-02-06	Win	(Brazil) André Martins	Red Fist Strike - 67 kg tournament, Semifinals	Baise, China	Decision (unanimous)	3	3:00
2025-10-18	Win	(Japan) Chappy Yoshinuma	Red Boxing Championship - Jinwu Heroes	Tianjin, China	Decision (unanimous)	3	3:00
Wins WKA K-1 Asia-Pacific -67kg title.
2025-08-09	Win	(Uzbekistan) Rachendist	Red Boxing Championship	Baise, China	TKO (low kicks)	3	
2025-02-29	Win	(Thailand) Yodkhunpon Weerasakreck	Wu Lin Feng 553	Tangshan, China	Decision (unanimous)	3	3:00
Yodkhunpon was deducted a point for missing weight and another point for clinching.
2024-09-29	Loss	(Argentina) Tomás Aguirre	K-1 World MAX 2024 - 65 kg Championship Tournament, Quarterfinals	Tokyo, Japan	Decision (unanimous)	3	3:00
2024-03-30	Win	(Kazakhstan) Alikhan Ozdoyev	Wu Lin Feng 20th Year Anniversary	Tangshan, China	Decision (unanimous)	3	3:00
2023-11-25	Win	(Ukraine) Serhiy Adamchuk	Wu Lin Feng 1000th Broadcast Celebration	Tangshan, China	Decision (unanimous)	5	3:00
Defends the Wu Lin Feng World -65kg title.
2023-06-10	Loss	(Russia) Kiamran Nabati	RCC Fair Fight 21	Yekaterinburg, Russia	Decision (unanimous)	5	3:00
For the RCC Fair Fight -65kg title.
2023-05-06	Win	(Russia) Dmitry Kovtun	Huya Kung Fu Carnival	Tianjin, China	TKO (punches)	3	
2023-02-04	Loss	(China) Zhou Jiaqiang	Wu Lin Feng 2023: Chinese New Year, 67 kg World Tournament Semi Final	Tangshan, China	Decision	3	3:00
2023-02-04	Win	(Portugal) Diego Freitas	Wu Lin Feng 2023: Chinese New Year, 67 kg World Tournament Quarter Final	Tangshan, China	Decision (unanimous)	3	3:00
2022-09-24	Win	(China) Weng Wei	Wu Lin Feng 531	Zhengzhou, China	Decision (unanimous)	3	3:00
2022-07-09	Loss	(China) Jia Aoqi	Wu Lin Feng x Huya Kung Fu Carnival 6	Zhengzhou, China	Decision (unanimous)	3	3:00
2022-01-01	Win	(China) Wang Pengfei	Wu Lin Feng 527	Tangshan, China	Decision (unanimous)	5	3:00
Wins the Wu Lin Feng World -65kg title.
2021-11-27	Win	(China) Zhao Chuanlin	Wu Lin Feng 2021: World Contender League 7th Stage Contender League Final	Zhengzhou, China	Decision (unanimous)	3	3:00
2021-09-30	Win	(China) Kong Dexiang	Wu Lin Feng 2021: World Contender League 6th Stage	Zhengzhou, China	Decision (unanimous)	3	3:00
2021-05-29	Win	(China) Shang Xifeng	Wu Lin Feng 2021: World Contender League 4th Stage	Zhengzhou, China	Decision (unanimous)	3	3:00
2021-03-27	Win	(China) Bai Lishuai	Wu Lin Feng 2021: World Contender League 1st Stage	China	Decision (unanimous)	3	3:00
2020-11-28	Win	(China) Pan Jiayun	Wu Lin Feng 2020: China 70kg Championship Tournament	Zhengzhou, China	Decision	3	3:00
2020-08-29	Win	(China) Pan Jiayun	Wu Lin Feng 2020: China New Kings Tournament Final	Zhengzhou, China	TKO (3 knockdowns)	1	1:48
Wins the vacant Wu Lin Feng China and IPCC China -65kg titles.
2020-08-03	Win	(China) Zhao Chuanlin	Wu Lin Feng 2020: King's Super Cup 4th Group Stage, China Tournament Semi Final	Zhengzhou, China	Decision	3	3:00
2020-07-05	Loss	(China) Pan Jiayun	Wu Lin Feng 2020: King's Super Cup 3rd Group Stage	Zhengzhou, China	Decision	3	3:00
2020-06-13	Win	(China) Kong Dexiang	Wu Lin Feng 2020: King's Super Cup 2nd Group Stage	Zhengzhou, China	Decision	3	3:00
2020-05-15	Win	(China) Bai Lishuai	Wu Lin Feng 2020: King's Super Cup 1st Group Stage	Zhengzhou, China	Decision	3	3:00
2019-12-25	Loss	(China) Tang Yao	Faith Fighting Championships 32	Shenzhen, China	Decision	3	3:00
For the Faith Fight China Professional League -67kg title.
2019-12-07	Loss	(Australia) River Daz	Glory 73: Shenzhen, Featherweight Tournament Final	Shenzhen, China	Decision (split)	3	3:00
2019-12-07	Win	(Japan) Masaya Kubo	Glory 73: Shenzhen, Featherweight Tournament Semi-Finals	Shenzhen, China	Decision (unanimous)	3	3:00
2019-10-26	Win	(China) Feng Lei	Faith Fighting Championships 31	Xi'an, China	Decision	3	3:00
2019-09-20	Win	(China) Xu Zhongyuan	Faith Fighting Championships 29	Shijiazhuang, China	Decision	3	3:00
2019-08-18	Win	(China) Zhou Jiaqiang	Faith Fighting Championships 27	Shijiazhuang, China	Decision	3	3:00
2019-06-22	Win	(China) Zhang Shuai	Faith Fighting Championships 25	Shijiazhuang, China	Decision	3	3:00
2019-06-06	Win	(China) Wang Yuanze	Kunlun Combat Professional League	China	TKO		
2018-12-29	Win	(China) You Long	Kunlun Combat Professional League	China	TKO		
2018-12-15	Loss	(China) Zhang Shuai	Faith Fighting Championships 15	Shijiazhuang, China	Decision	3	3:00
2018-11-15	Loss	(China) Wang Wei	Faith Fighting Championships 14	Shenzhen, China	Decision	3	3:00
2018-09-01	Win	(China) Li Qiyu	Faith Fighting Championships 12	Shenzhen, China	Decision	3	3:00
2018-07-28	Win	(China) Xu Zhongyuan	Faith Fighting Championships 10	Shenzhen, China	KO (right cross)	2	2:30
2018-05-05	Win	(China) Meng Kang	Wu Lin Feng	Nanyang, China	Decision	3	3:00
2018-05-05	Win	(China) Li Shibo	Wu Lin Feng	Nanyang, China	Decision	3	3:00
2018-01-27	Win	(Iran) Hussein	Long Jue Liangjian	Liaoyang, China	Decision	3	3:00
2017-12-12	Loss	(China) Wang Jin	Wu Lin Feng	China	Decision	3	3:00
For the 2017 Wu Lin Feng Rookie Tournament title.
2017-10-18	Win	(China) Zhang Songshan	Wu Lin Feng New Generation	China	TKO		
2017-10-18	Win	(China) Zhang Xiangfei	Wu Lin Feng New Generation	China	TKO		
2017-07-25	Loss	(China) Liu Qiliang	Wu Lin Feng New Generation	China	Decision	3	3:00
2017-05-05	Win	(China) Wang Jingwei	Wu Lin Feng New Generation	China	TKO		
2017-05-05	Win	(China) Liu Laguan	Wu Lin Feng New Generation	China	Decision	3	3:00
2017-03-25	Loss	(China) Liu Qiliang	Wu Lin Feng New Generation	Rizhao, China	Decision	3	3:00
Legend: Win Loss Draw/no contest Notes

Amateur kickboxing record
Date	Result	Opponent	Event	Location	Method	Round	Time
2019-04-03	Win	(China) Tang Yao	China Kickboxing Championships, Final	China	Decision		
Wins the 2019 China Kickboxing Championships -67kg title.
Legend: Win Loss Draw/no contest Notes

== Mixed martial arts record ==
Professional record breakdown
1 match	0 wins	1 loss
By submission	0	1

Res.	Record	Opponent	Method	Event	Date	Round	Time	Location	Notes
Loss	0-1	(China) Ha Leng Bie Ke	Submission (Rear naked choke)	Chinese MMA Super League	12 October 2016	2	1:53	China	
