= 2022 in Wu Lin Feng =

Chinese kickboxing events

Information
- First date: January 1
- Last date: December 10

Events
- Total events: TBD

Fights
- Total fights: TBD
- Title fights: TBD

The year 2022 is the 19th year in the history of the Wu Lin Feng, a Chinese kickboxing promotion. The events are broadcast on Henan Television in mainland China and streamed on Douyin and Xigua Video.

== List of events ==
No.	Event	Date	Venue	City
1	Wu Lin Feng	January 1, 2022		Tangshan, China

== Wu Lin Feng 527 ==
Wu Lin Feng
- Promotion: Wu Lin Feng
- Date: January 1, 2022
- City: Tangshan, China

Wu Lin Feng was a kickboxing event held on January 1, 2022, in Tangshan, China.

=== Background ===
A 61kg bout between Zhao Chongyang and Leeseethuan Chadchay was scheduled for the event.

=== Results ===
Weight Class				Method	Round	Time	Notes
Kickboxing -61 kg	(China) Zhao Chongyang	def.	(Thailand) Leeseethuan Chadchay	TKO	3		
Kickboxing -63 kg	(China) Ma Yunkang	def.	(China) Wang Jiale	Decision	3	3:00	
Kickboxing -70 kg	(China) Ouyang Feng	def.	(China) Luo Chao	Decision (Majority)	3	3:00	
Kickboxing -60 kg	(China) Yang Ming	def.	(China) Huang Shuailu	Decision (Unanimous)	3	3:00	WLF World contender league -60kg final
Kickboxing -77.5 kg	(China) Fu Gaofeng	def.	(Madagascar) Mahery Rakotonirina	Decision (Unanimous)	3	3:00	
Kickboxing -63 kg	(China) Jin Ying	def.	(China) Wei Weiyang	Decision (Unanimous)	3	3:00	WLF World contender league -63kg final
Kickboxing -65 kg	(China) Wei Rui	def.	(Russia) Sergei Lutchenko	Decision (Unanimous)	3	3:00	
Kickboxing -65 kg	(China) Meng Gaofeng	def.	(China) Wang Pengfei (c)	Decision (Unanimous)	5	3:00	For the WLF World -65kg title

== Wu Lin Feng 528 ==
Wu Lin Feng 528
- Promotion: Wu Lin Feng
- Date: March 26, 2022
- City: Zhengzhou, China

Wu Lin Feng 528 was a kickboxing event held on March 26, 2022, in Zhengzhou, China.

=== Results ===
Weight Class				Method	Round	Time	Notes
Kickboxing -64kg	(China) Zhu Shuai	def.	(Russia) Sergei Lutchenko	KO (Left hook)	1	2:21	
Kickboxing -70kg	(China) Liu Lei	def.	(China) Xu Liu	Decision (Unanimous)	3	3:00	
Kickboxing -63kg	(China) Ma Yunkang	def.	(China) Zhang Lanpei	Decision (Unanimous)	3	3:00	Zhang Lanpei was deducted 1 point before the fight for missing weight
Kickboxing Women -56kg	(China) Li Mingrui	def.	(China) Qiu Lan	Decision (Unanimous)	3	3:00	
Kickboxing Women -52kg	(China) Liu Yueer	def.	(China) Xiao Mulan	Decision (Unanimous)	3	3:00	
Kickboxing -70kg	(China) Luo Chao	def.	(China) Ouyang Feng	Decision (Unanimous)	3	3:00	WLF China -70kg 4-man tournament final
Kickboxing -63kg	(China) Jin Ying	def.	(China) San Shun	Decision (Unanimous)	3	3:00	WLF China -63kg 4-man tournament final
Kickboxing -60kg	(China) Huang Shuailu	def.	(China) Yang Ming	Decision (Split)	3	3:00	WLF China -60kg 4-man tournament final
Kickboxing -58kg	(China) Wang Junguang	def.	(China) Qumu Xifu	Decision (Unanimous)	3	3:00	
Kickboxing -70kg	(China) Xu Hao	def.	(China) Chen Yonghoi	Decision (Unanimous)	3	3:00	
Kickboxing -70kg	(China) Luo Chao	def.	(China) Han Wenbao	Decision (Unanimous)	3	3:00	WLF China -70kg 4-man tournament semi final
Kickboxing -70kg	(China) Ouyang Feng	def.	(China) Shuai Qi	Decision (Unanimous)	3	3:00	WLF China -70kg 4-man tournament semi final
Kickboxing -63 kg	(China) Jin Ying	def.	(China) Liu Wei	Decision (Unanimous)	3	3:00	WLF China -63kg 4-man tournament semi final
Kickboxing -63 kg	(China) Shun Li	def.	(China) Li Yuxeng	Decision (Unanimous)	3	3:00	WLF China -63kg 4-man tournament semi final
Kickboxing -60 kg	(China) Yang Ming	def.	(China) Zhao Boshi	Decision (Unanimous)	3	3:00	WLF China -60kg 4-man tournament semi final
Kickboxing -60 kg	(China) Huang Shuailu	def.	(China) Zhao Chongyang	Decision (Split)	3	3:00	WLF China -60kg 4-man tournament semi final

== Wu Lin Feng 2022: WLF in Cambodia ==
Wu Lin Feng 529: Cambodia
- Promotion: Wu Lin Feng
- Date: April 10, 2022
- City: Angkor, Cambodia

Wu Lin Feng 529: Cambodia was a kickboxing event held on April 10, 2022, in Angkor, Cambodia.

=== Results ===
Weight Class				Method	Round	Time	Notes
Kun Khmer -58kg	(Cambodia) Chut Serey Vanthong	def.	(Cambodia) Vann Voeurn	KO (Low kicks)	2		4-man Tournament Final
Kickboxing Women -52kg	(Cambodia) Nou Srey Pov	def.	(China) Li Lishan	Decision	3	3:00	
Kickboxing -80kg	(China) Wang Aogang	def.	(Cambodia) Prom Samnang	Decision	3	3:00	
Kickboxing -71kg	(China) Han Wenbao	def.	(Cambodia) Chhoeung Lvai	KO (Punches)	1		
Kickboxing -72kg	(China) Luo Chao	def.	(Cambodia) Lao Chantrea	KO (Body punches)	1	1:08	
Kickboxing -64kg	(China) Wei Weiyang	def.	(Cambodia) Lao Chetra	Decision	3	3:00	
Kickboxing -65kg	(Cambodia) Lorn Panha	def.	(China) Shang Xifeng	Decision	3	3:00	
Kickboxing -60kg	(China) Yang Hua	def.	(Cambodia) Soth Veasna	KO (Left hook to the body)	1	0:50	
Kickboxing -65kg	(China) Wei Rui	def.	(Cambodia) Phal Sophorn	Decision	3	3:00	
Kun Khmer -58kg	(Cambodia) Vann Voeurn	def.	(China) Su Kexin	TKO (Elbow)	3	2:59	4-man Tournament Semi Final
Kun Khmer -58kg	(Cambodia) Chut Serey Vanthong	def.	(China) Wei Ziqin	Decision	3	3:00	4-man Tournament Semi Final

== Wu Lin Feng x Huya Kung Fu Carnival 6 ==
Wu Lin Feng x Huya Kung Fu Carnival 6
- Promotion: Wu Lin Feng, Huya FC
- Date: July 9, 2022
- City: Zhengzhou, China

Wu Lin Feng x Huya Kung Fu Carnival 6 was a martial arts event held on July 9, 2022, in Zhengzhou, China.

=== Results ===
Weight Class				Method	Round	Time	Notes
Kickboxing -68kg	(China) Jia Aoqi	def.	(China) Meng Gaofeng	Decision (Unanimous)	3	3:00	
Kickboxing -70kg	(China) Ren Guohao	def.	(China) Shuai Qi	Ext.R Decision	4	3:00	
Kickboxing -60kg	(China) Pan Jing	def.	(China) Li Yuankun	Decision (Unanimous)	3	3:00	
Kickboxing -67kg	(China) Zhou Jiaqiang	def.	(China) Zhang Kui	Decision	3	3:00	
Kickboxing -75kg	(China) Li Hui	def.	(China) Tan Xiaofeng	Decision (Unanimous)	3	3:00	4-man Tournament Final
Muay Thai -63kg	(China) Zhou Mingyang	def.	(China) Mo Yonghui	Decision	3	3:00	
MMA -63kg	(China) Dewang	vs.	(China) Yerken Murzatai				
Kickboxing -58kg	(China) Liu Zhipeng	def.	(China) Lan Shanteng	KO (Knee to the body)	3	0:35	
MMA Women's -66kg	(China) Wang Cong	def.	(China) Ji Hongfeng	Submission (Read-naked choke)	2		
Muay Thai -71kg	(China) Xu Jiajie	def.	(China) Wang Wei	KO (Left hook to the body)	1		
Kickboxing -56kg	(China) Wang Haoyu	def.	(China) Jia Kai	Decision	3	3:00	
Muay Thai -61kg	(China) Liu Bolin	def.	(China) Ma Qiang	Decision (Unanimous)	3	3:00	
Kickboxing -75kg	(China) Li Hui	def.	(China) Chang Junchang	Decision (Unanimous)	3	3:00	4-man Tournament Semi Final
Kickboxing -75kg	(China) Tan Xiaofeng	def.	(China) Cai Weihao	Decision (Unanimous)	3	3:00	4-man Tournament Semi Final
Kickboxing -65kg	(China) Zhang Shuai	def.	(China) Li Tao	Decision (Unanimous)	3	3:00	
Kickboxing -80kg	(China) Luo Can	def.	(China) Cao Shuaihang	KO (Punches)	2	1:28	
Kickboxing -66kg	(China) Zhang Xinbo	def.	(China) Pan Jiayun	Decision (Unanimous)	3	3:00	
Kickboxing -65kg	(China) Er Kang	def.	(China) Bai Lishuai	Decision (Unanimous)	3	3:00	
Kickboxing -67kg	(China) Xu Jan	def.	(China) Zhang Zihao	Decision (Unanimous)	3	3:00	
Kickboxing -63kg	(China) San Shun	def.	(China) Gao Haiwen	KO (Punches)	1	2:10	

== Wu Lin Feng 531 ==
Wu Lin Feng 531
- Promotion: Wu Lin Feng
- Date: September 24, 2022
- City: Zhengzhou, China

Wu Lin Feng 531 was a martial arts event held on September 24, 2022, in Zhengzhou, China.

=== Results ===
Weight Class				Method	Round	Time	Notes
Kickboxing -71.5kg	(China) Jia Aoqi	def.	(Thailand) Wacharalek	Decision (Unanimous)	3	3:00	
Kickboxing -67kg	(China) Meng Gaofeng	def.	(China) Wang Wei	Decision (Unanimous)	3	3:00	
Kickboxing Women -52kg	(China) Liu Yuer	def.	(China) Li Lishan	Decision (Unanimous)	3	3:00	
Kickboxing -70kg	(China) Han Wenbao	def.	(China) Liu Yunlong	Decision (Unanimous)	3	3:00	
Kickboxing -70kg	(China) Liu Lei	def.	(China) Chen Yonghui	Decision	3	3:00	
Kickboxing -70kg	(China) Luo Chao	def.	(China) Qu Hao	Decision (Unanimous)	3	3:00	
Kickboxing -70kg	(China) Ouyang Feng	def.	(China) Wang Xin	KO (Knee)	1		
Kickboxing -63kg	(China) Jin Ying	def.	(China) Ma Yunkang	Decision (Unanimous)	3	3:00	
Kickboxing -63kg	(China) Zhu Shuai	def.	(China) San Shun	Decision (Unanimous)	3	3:00	
Kickboxing -63kg	(China) Wei Weiyang	def.	(China) Shun Li	TKO	1		
Kickboxing -60kg	(China) Jin Hu	def.	(China) Yang Hua	Decision	3	3:00	
Kickboxing -63kg	(China) Zhang Jun	def.	(China) Zhang Tieguo	TKO	1		
Kickboxing	(China) Huan Xiaofeng	vs.	(China) Shi Zhii				
Kickboxing -75kg	(China) Ding Meng	def.	(China) Qi Juncheng	Decision	3	3:00	
Kickboxing -75kg	(China) Liu Haoyang	def.	(China) Cai Weihao	Decision	3	3:00	
Kickboxing -75kg	(China) Li Hui	vs.	(China) Qian Tengjin				
Kickboxing -60kg	(China) Zhao Chongyang	def.	(China) Zewa Liluo	Decision	3	3:00	
Kickboxing -60kg	(China) Yang Ming	def.	(China) Pan Jing	Decision	3	3:00	
Kickboxing -60kg	(China) Huang Shuailu	def.	(China) Li Xancheng	Decision	3	3:00	
Kickboxing -67kg	(China) Zhongshan	def.	(China) Er Kang	Decision	3	3:00	
Kickboxing -58kg	(China) Liu Zhibon	def.	(China) Su Kexin	Decision	3	3:00	
Kickboxing -64kg	(China) Wang Ponghoi	def.	(China) Wang Kunliang	Decision	3	3:00	
Kickboxing -58kg	(China) Qumu Xifu	def.	(China) Zhang Yong	Decision	3	3:00	

== Wu Lin Feng 532 ==
Wu Lin Feng 532
- Promotion: Wu Lin Feng
- Date: December 9-10, 2022
- City: Zhengzhou, China

Wu Lin Feng 532 was a martial arts event originally scheduled on November 26, 2022, in Zhengzhou, China. The event was postponed due to the covid restrictions in China and rescheduled as a two parts event on December 9 and 10.

=== Results ===
Wu Lin Feng 532 Day 1
Weight Class				Method	Round	Time	Notes
Kickboxing -70kg	(China) Ouyang Feng	def.	(China) Luo Chao	Decision	3	3:00	Tournament Final
Kickboxing -71kg	(Russia) Vladimir Shuliak	def.	(China) Tie Yinghua	TKO (Corner stoppage)	3		
Kickboxing -68kg	(China) Zhou Jiaqiang	vs.	(China) Qu Hao				
Kickboxing -70kg	(China) Luo Chao	def.	(China) Han Wenbao	Decision	3	3:00	Tournament Semi Final
Kickboxing -70kg	(China) Ouyang Feng	def.	(China) Liu Lei	Decision	3	3:00	Tournament Semi Final
Kickboxing -58kg	(China) Zewa Liluo	def.	(China) Ma Qiang	Decision	3	3:00	
Kickboxing -63kg	(China) Zhu Shuai	def.	(China) Jin Ying	Decision (Unanimous)	3	3:00	Tournament Final
Kickboxing -64kg	(China) San Shun	def.	(China) Chen Fufan	Decision	3	3:00	
Kickboxing -60kg	(China) Huang Shuailu	def.	(China) Jin Hu	Decision (Unanimous)	3	3:00	Tournament Final
Kickboxing -63kg	(China) Jin Ying	def.	(China) Zhang Jun	Decision	3	3:00	Tournament Semi Final
Kickboxing -63kg	(China) Zhu Shuai	def.	(China) Wei Weiyang	Decision	3	3:00	Tournament Semi Final
Kickboxing -60kg	(China) Huang Shuailu	def.	(China) Yang Ming	Decision	3	3:00	Tournament Semi Final
Kickboxing -60kg	(China) Jin Hu	def.	(China) Zhao Chongyang	Forfeit			Tournament Semi Final
Kickboxing Women -60kg	(China) Qiu Lan	vs.	(China) Han Xin				
Kickboxing -67kg	(China) Li Changbang	vs.	(China) Xu Jian				
Kickboxing -58kg	(China) Liu Zhipeng	vs.	(Thailand) Pornpipat				

Wu Lin Feng 532 Day 2
Weight Class				Method	Round	Time	Notes
Kickboxing -65kg	(China) Liu Xiangming	def.	(China) Er Kang	Decision	3	3:00	Tournament Final
Kickboxing -75kg	(China) Li Hui	def.	(China) Ding Meng	Decision	3	3:00	Tournament Final
Kickboxing -58kg	(China) Huang Qirui	vs.	(China) Wu Di				
Kickboxing -64kg	(China) Chen Jinwang	vs.	(China) Han Wuxiang				
Kickboxing -65kg	(China) Liu Xiangming	def.	(China) Zhang Kui	Decision	3	3:00	Tournament Semi Final
Kickboxing -65kg	(China) Er Kang	def.	(China) Pan Jiayun	Decision	3	3:00	Tournament Semi Final
Kickboxing -75kg	(China) Li Hui	def.	(China) Yan Qili	Decision	3	3:00	Tournament Semi Final
Kickboxing -75kg	(China) Ding Meng	def.	(China) Cai Weihao	Decision	3	3:00	Tournament Semi Final
Kickboxing -65kg	(China) Liu Xiangming	def.	(China) Shang Xifeng	Decision			Tournament Quarter Final
Kickboxing -65kg	(China) Zhang Kui	def.	(China) Bai Lishuai	TKO	2		Tournament Quarter Final
Kickboxing -65kg	(China) Pan Jiayun	def.	(China) Wang Wanli	Decision	3	3:00	Tournament Quarter Final
Kickboxing -65kg	(China) Er Kang	def.	(China) Zhang Xinbo	Decision	3	3:00	Tournament Quarter Final

== See also ==
- 2022 in Glory
- 2022 in K-1
- 2022 in RISE
- 2022 in ONE Championship
- 2022 in Romanian kickboxing
