= Kickboxing at the 2023 SEA Games =

- Venue: Elephant Hall 1, Morodok Techo Sports Complex
- Location: Phnom Penh, Cambodia
- Dates: 13–16 May 2023

Kickboxing competitions at the 2023 SEA Games took place at Elephant Hall 1, Morodok Techo Sports Complex in Phnom Penh. Medals were awarded in 17 events.

== Medal table ==
* Host nation (Cambodia)

Rank	Nation	Gold	Silver	Bronze	Total
1	Cambodia*	6	1	6	13
2	Vietnam	4	4	7	15
3	Philippines	3	4	8	15
4	Indonesia	3	4	5	12
5	Malaysia	1	0	1	2
6	Thailand	0	3	6	9
7	Laos	0	1	1	2
Totals (7 entries)		17	17	34	68

== Medalists ==
=== Kick light ===
Event	Gold	Silver	Bronze
Men's 63 kg	Abdul Aziz; Indonesia	Trần Minh Hậu; Vietnam	Met Borin; Cambodia
Men's 63 kg	Abdul Aziz; Indonesia	Trần Minh Hậu; Vietnam	Airon Lance Villamer; Philippines
Men's 69 kg	Ahmad Nor Iman Hakim Rakib; Malaysia	Firman Muharram Syach; Indonesia	Tep Yinyan; Cambodia
Men's 69 kg	Ahmad Nor Iman Hakim Rakib; Malaysia	Firman Muharram Syach; Indonesia	Pikanet Sukyik; Thailand
Women's 55 kg	Diandra Ariesta Pieter; Indonesia	Gina Araos; Philippines	Nguyễn Thị Ngọc Ngân; Vietnam
Women's 55 kg	Diandra Ariesta Pieter; Indonesia	Gina Araos; Philippines	Chhat Chanmony; Cambodia

=== Full contact ===
Event	Gold	Silver	Bronze
Men's 54 kg	Toni Kristian Hutapea; Indonesia	Sittichok Naksawad; Thailand	Mikko Camingawan; Philippines
Men's 54 kg	Toni Kristian Hutapea; Indonesia	Sittichok Naksawad; Thailand	Nguyễn Văn Hải; Vietnam
Men's 60 kg	Nguyễn Xuân Phương; Vietnam	Soukan Taipanyavong; Laos	Danny Kingad; Philippines
Men's 60 kg	Nguyễn Xuân Phương; Vietnam	Soukan Taipanyavong; Laos	Phoin Chanthy; Cambodia
Men's 67 kg	Lorn Panha; Cambodia	Abdul Haris Sofyan; Indonesia	Carlo Buminaang; Philippines
Men's 67 kg	Lorn Panha; Cambodia	Abdul Haris Sofyan; Indonesia	Nguyễn Thế Hưởng; Vietnam
Women's 48 kg	Nguyễn Thị Hằng Nga; Vietnam	Renalyn Dacquel; Philippines	Paula Rewade Saruke; Indonesia
Women's 48 kg	Nguyễn Thị Hằng Nga; Vietnam	Renalyn Dacquel; Philippines	Nitinart Plabplerng; Thailand

=== Low kick ===
Event	Gold	Silver	Bronze
Men's 51 kg	Sok Rith; Cambodia	Huỳnh Văn Tuấn; Vietnam	Wassof Rumijam; Malaysia
Men's 51 kg	Sok Rith; Cambodia	Huỳnh Văn Tuấn; Vietnam	Kurt Lubrica; Philippines
Men's 57 kg	Toch Rachhan; Cambodia	Nguyễn Quang Huy; Vietnam	Chaiwat Sungnoi; Thailand
Men's 57 kg	Toch Rachhan; Cambodia	Nguyễn Quang Huy; Vietnam	Jomar Balangui; Philippines
Men's 63.5 kg	Jean Claude Saclag; Philippines	San Rakim; Cambodia	Chaleamlap Santidongsakun; Thailand
Men's 63.5 kg	Jean Claude Saclag; Philippines	San Rakim; Cambodia	Dimitri Kyttanasilalack; Laos
Men's 71 kg	Chhoeung Lvai; Cambodia	Thanaphat Tonphosi; Thailand	Kiều Duy Quân; Vietnam
Men's 71 kg	Chhoeung Lvai; Cambodia	Thanaphat Tonphosi; Thailand	Honorio Antonio Banario; Philippines
Women's 56 kg	Gretel de Paz; Philippines	Susanti Ndapataka; Indonesia	Đinh Thị Hoa; Vietnam
Women's 56 kg	Gretel de Paz; Philippines	Susanti Ndapataka; Indonesia	Vy Sretchhay; Cambodia

=== Light contact ===
Event	Gold	Silver	Bronze
Men's 63 kg	Rin Davit; Cambodia	Korrakot Wijitnavee; Thailand	Nguyễn Đình Thái; Vietnam
Men's 63 kg	Rin Davit; Cambodia	Korrakot Wijitnavee; Thailand	David Leonardo; Indonesia
Women's 50 kg	Lê Thị Nhi; Vietnam	Fitzchel Fermato; Philippines	Fani Febriyanti; Indonesia
Women's 50 kg	Lê Thị Nhi; Vietnam	Fitzchel Fermato; Philippines	Chan Vicheka; Cambodia

=== K-1 ===
Event	Gold	Silver	Bronze
Men's 51 kg	Sainy Sainet; Cambodia	Salmri Stendra Pattisamallo; Indonesia	Daryl Chulipas; Philippines
Men's 51 kg	Sainy Sainet; Cambodia	Salmri Stendra Pattisamallo; Indonesia	Nguyễn Tuấn Kiệt; Vietnam
Men's 67 kg	Hoàng Văn Chính; Vietnam	Jeremy Pacatiw; Philippines	O-wat Taemyom; Thailand
Men's 67 kg	Hoàng Văn Chính; Vietnam	Jeremy Pacatiw; Philippines	Claudions Reco; Indonesia
Women's 52 kg	Claudine Veloso; Philippines	Bùi Hải Linh; Vietnam	Piamsuk Permkhunthod; Thailand
Women's 52 kg	Claudine Veloso; Philippines	Bùi Hải Linh; Vietnam	Aprilia Eka Putri; Indonesia
