= Tomás Aguirre =

Argentinian kickboxer

- Born: November 25, 1998 (age 27); Pergamino, Argentina
- Other names: El Chacal
- Height: 168 cm (5 ft 6 in)
- Weight: 63 kg (139 lb; 10 st)
- Style: Kickboxing
- Fighting out of: Buenos Aires, Argentina
- Team: Dojo Serpiente
- Trainer: Cristian Bosch

Kickboxing record
- Total: 50
- Wins: 40
- By knockout: 25
- Losses: 9
- Draws: 1

Tomás Aguirre (born November 25, 1998) is an Argentinian kickboxer and muay thai fighter.

As of December 2024 he was the #10 ranked -64 kg kickboxer in the world by Beyond Kickboxing.

== Career ==
On December 8, 2019, Aguirre challenged Paulo Tebar for his WGP Kickboxing Super-lightweight title at WGP #61 in Fortaleza, Brazil. He lost the fight by unanimous decision.

On May 7, 2022, Aguirre won a 4-man tournament at Buenos Aires Top Fight 4. In the semifinals he defeated Bruno Marques from Brazil by second-round technical knockout. In the final he knocked out Colombia's Ángel Escobar in the first round.

Aguirre faced Glory title challenger Abraham Vidales at Glory Rivals 5 on January 28, 2023, in Tulum, Mexico. He lost the fight by unanimous decision.

Aguirre was scheduled to make the third defense of his WGP Super-lightweight title on April 27, 2023, in a rematch against Ignacio Famozo at WGP Kickboxing #74. He won the fight by split decision.

On September 29, 2024, Aguirre took part in an 8-man one night one night tournament at K-1 World MAX 2024 for the vacant K-1 Super Lightweight (-65kg) title. In the quarterfinals he defeated reigning Wu Lin Feng -65 kg champion Meng Gaofeng by unanimous decision after scoring a knockodown. He advanced to the semifinals where he faced Krush champion Shu Inagaki who defeated him by unanimous decision after Aguirre suffered a knockdown.

On November 23, 2024, Aguirre faced reigning Krush Lightweight champion Tatsuya Oiwa at Krush 168 in a 63 kg non-title fight. He won the bout by extension round unanimous decision.

Aguirre faced Yuzuki Satomi at K-1 World MAX 2025 on February 9, 2025. He lost the fight by unanimous decision, with all three judges scoring the bout 30–29 in Satomi's favor.

On November 27, 2025, Aguirre faced Denis Souza Jr. as a defense of his WGP Kickboxing Super Lightweight title at WGP Kickboxing 83. He lost the fight by unanimous decision after suffering a knockdown in the first round.

== Titles and accomplishments ==
- International Sport Kickboxing Association
  - 2018 ISKA K-1 Argentina Lightweight (-63.5 kg) Champion
- WGP Kickboxing
  - 2022 WGP Kickboxing Super-lightweight (-64.5 kg) Champion
    - Three successful title defenses
- World Kickboxing Network
  - 2018 WKN K-1 Argentina (-65 kg) Champion
    - One successful title defense
  - 2026 WKN K-1 World Lightweight (-64.4 kg) Champion

== Fight record ==
Professional Kickboxing Record
40 Wins (25 (T)KOs), 9 Losses, 1 Draw
Date	Result	Opponent	Event	Location	Method	Round	Time
2026-08-08	Win	(Thailand) Kimluay Wankhongohm	Rajadamnern World Series, Rajadamnern Stadium	Bangkok, Thailand	Decision (Unanimous)	3	3:00
2026-06-06	Win	(Thailand) Jack Rachanon	Rajadamnern World Series, Rajadamnern Stadium	Bangkok, Thailand	Decision (Unanimous)	3	3:00
2026-04-11	Win	(France) Christopher Walter	Noche De Leyendas 3	Buenos Aires, Argentina	TKO (Corner stoppage)	4	0:51
Wins the vacant WKN K-1 World Lightweight (-64.4 kg) title.
2025-11-27	Loss	(Brazil) Denis Souza Jr.	WGP Kickboxing 82	Serra, Brazil	Decision (Unanimous)	5	3:00
Loses the WGP Kickboxing Super Lightweight (-64.5 kg) title.
2025-10-11	Win	(Spain) Antonio Campoy	Noche De Leyendas 2	Badalona, Spain	KO (Flying knee)	1	2:10
2025-06-14	Loss	(Thailand) Petchdam Petchyindee Academy	Rajadamnern World Series	Bangkok, Thailand	Decision (Split)	3	3:00
2025-05-04	Draw	(Cambodia) Eh Amarin Phouthong	Wurkz Kun Khmer Warriors	Phnom Penh, Cambodia	Decision	3	3:00
2025-04-12	Win	(Uruguay) Agustín Veloz	ATFC II	Buenos Aires, Argentina	KO (Flying knee)	1	
2025-02-09	Loss	(Japan) Yuzuki Satomi	K-1 World MAX 2025	Tokyo, Japan	Decision (Unanimous)	3	3:00
2024-11-23	Win	(Japan) Tatsuya Oiwa	Krush 168	Nagoya, Japan	Ext.R Decision (Unanimous)	4	3:00
2024-09-29	Loss	(Japan) Shu Inagaki	K-1 World MAX 2024 - 65 kg Championship Tournament, Semifinals	Tokyo, Japan	Decision (Unanimous)	3	3:00
2024-09-29	Win	(China) Meng Gaofeng	K-1 World MAX 2024 - 65 kg Championship Tournament, Quarterfinals	Tokyo, Japan	Decision (Unanimous)	3	3:00
2024-08-26	Win	(France) Lucas Poma	All Star Fight, Rajadamnern Stadium	Bangkok, Thailand	KO (Left hook)	1	2:31
2024-07-25	Loss	(Cambodia) Long Samnang	Kun Khmer - Bayon TV	Phnom Penh, Cambodia	Decision	5	3:00
2024-04-27	Win	(Argentina) Ignacio Famozo	WGP Kickboxing 74	Brasília, Brazil	Decision (Unanimous)	5	3:00
Defends the WGP Kickboxing Super Lightweight (-64.5kg) title.
2023-15-15	Win	(Brazil) Vinicius Mestrinier	WGP Kickboxing 72	Brasília, Brazil	Decision (Split)	5	3:00
Defends the WGP Kickboxing Super Lightweight (-64.5kg) title.
2023-10-28	Win	(Mexico) Victor Castro	Buenos Aires Top Fights	Buenos Aires, Argentina	Decision (Unanimous)	5	2:00
2023-06-23	Win	(Thailand)	Rajadamnern Knockout, Rajadamnern Stadium	Bangkok, Thailand	Decision (Unanimous)	3	3:00
2023-05-27	Win	(Thailand) Teelek	Sinbi Boxing Stadium	Phuket, Thailand	KO (High kick)	2	
2023-04-29	Win	(Argentina) Ignacio Famozo	WGP Kickboxing 69	Brasília, Brazil	Decision (Split)	5	3:00
Defends the WGP Kickboxing Super Lightweight (-64.5kg) title.
2023-01-28	Loss	(Mexico) Abraham Vidales	Glory Rivals 5	Tulum, Mexico	Decision (Unanimous)	3	3:00
2022-10-12	Win	(Bolivia) Renzo Martinez	WGP Kickboxing Studio 1	São Paulo, Brazil	Decision (Unanimous)	5	3:00
Wins the vacant WGP Kickboxing Super Lightweight (-64.5 kg) title.
2022-09-04	Win	(Argentina) Cristián Duré	Fight Dragon	Buenos Aires, Argentina	Decision (Unanimous)	5	3:00
2022-05-07	Win	(Colombia) Angel Escobar	Buenos Aires Top Fight 4, Final	Buenos Aires, Argentina	TKO (Punches)	1	2:35
2022-05-07	Win	(Brazil) Bruno Marques	Buenos Aires Top Fight 4, Semi Final	Buenos Aires, Argentina	TKO (retirement)	2	3:00
2022-04-09	Win	(Paraguay) Mauricio Noguera	Buenos Aires Top Fights	Buenos Aires, Argentina	KO (Left hook)	1	1:25
2022-02-12	Win	(Uruguay) Mario Falero	WKN Knockout 9	Argentina	KO (Low kick)	3	1:01
2021-12-12	Win	(Argentina) Braian Caggiano	WKN	Buenos Aires, Argentina	KO (High kick)	1	
Defends WKN K-1 Argentina -65 kg title.
2021-06-27	Win	(Argentina) Walter Martínez	Leon Fighter League 24	Buenos Aires, Argentina	KO (Low kick)	2	2:20
2021-01-02	Win	(Argentina) Facundo Aguirre	Invictus Deluxe	Argentina	Decision (Unanimous)	5	2:00
2019-12-08	Loss	(Brazil) Paulo Tebar	WGP Kickboxing 61	Fortaleza, Brazil	Decision (Unanimous)	5	3:00
For the WGP Kickboxing Super Lightweight (-64.5 kg) title.
2019-06-15	Win	(Mexico) Josue Cruz	WGP Kickboxing 55, Final	Brasília, Brazil	KO (Low kick)	2	2:41
2019-06-15	Win	(Brazil) Eduardo Borba	WGP Kickboxing 55, Semi Final	Brasília, Brazil	KO (Punches)	3	1:45
2019-04-27	Win	(Brazil) Samuel Paiva	WKF Ushuaia Fight Night	Ushuaia, Argentina	TKO	1	
2019-04-19	Loss	(Argentina) Nicolas Jara	Bosch Tour 17 - Super 8, Final	Buenos Aires, Argentina	Decision (Majority)	3	2:00
2019-04-19	Win	(Argentina) Nicolas Dieguez	Bosch Tour 17 - Super 8, Semi Final	Buenos Aires, Argentina	KO (Punches)		
2019-04-19	Win	(Argentina) Sebastian Uribe	Bosch Tour 17 - Super 8, Quarter Final	Buenos Aires, Argentina			
2019-03-30	Win	(Austria) Malik Agbaba		Vienna, Austria	Decision	3	3:00
2018-12-21	Win	(Uruguay) Iván Bodeant	Bosch Tour XV	Buenos Aires, Argentina	KO (Left hook to the body)	1	2:50
2018-11-10	Win	(Argentina) Pablo Orue	Bosch Tour 14	Buenos Aires, Argentina	TKO	2	
Wins WKF K-1 Argentina -63.5 kg title.
2018-09-23	Win	(Argentina) Enzo Diaz	Invictus Deluxe	Argentina	KO (Punches)	4	1:22
Wins ISKA K-1 Argentina -63.5 kg title.
2018-07-22	Win	(Argentina) Alexis Grasso	Bosch Tour - WKN Simply the Best 21	Buenos Aires, Argentina	KO (Hook to the body + low kick)	1	1:25
Wins WKN K-1 Argentina -65 kg title.
2018-06-10	Loss	(Argentina) Erik Miloc	PUNISHERS 9, Super 4 Semi Final	Buenos Aires, Argentina	Decision (Unanimous)	3	3:00
2018-04-16	Win	(Argentina)	Top King	Buenos Aires, Argentina	KO	1	
2018-03-18	Win	(Argentina) Sebastian Schmidt	Bosch Tour	Buenos Aires, Argentina	KO (Punches)	1	
Wins the Bosch Tour K-1 -63 kg title.
2017-12-15	Win	(Argentina) Nicolas Jara	WGP Kickboxing 43	Buenos Aires, Argentina	TKO (Ref.stop./Punches)	2	1:50
2017-09-10	Win	(Argentina) Gianfranco Scuffi	PUNISHERS 8	Buenos Aires, Argentina	TKO (Referee stoppage)		
Legend: Win Loss Draw/No contest Notes
