= Ouyang Feng (kickboxer) =

Chinese Sanda kickboxer (born 1997)

- Born: 欧阳锋; October 10, 1997 (age 29); Quanjiao, Chuzhou, Anhui, China
- Nickname: "Western Poison" (小西毒)
- Height: 1.81 m (5 ft 11 1/2 in)
- Weight: 70 kg (150 lb; 11 st)
- Style: Sanda, Kickboxing
- Fighting out of: Tianjin, China
- Team: Tianjin Afu Fight Club

Kickboxing record
- Total: 52
- Wins: 47
- By knockout: 22
- Losses: 4
- By knockout: 0
- No contests: 1

Ouyang Feng (Chinese: 欧阳锋) is a Chinese Sanda kickboxer. He is the current Wu Lin Feng champion and a former K-1 70 kg World champion.

== Kickboxing career ==
=== Early career ===
Ouyang started to compete for the Kunlun Fight organization in 2018, winning his first six bouts by knockout. This included a victory over Guan Yirui on November 5, 2018.

Ouyang suffered his first professional loss on October 3, 2019, when Dzianis Zuev defeated him by decision on Kunlun Fight 86.

=== Wu Lin Feng ===
On May 15, 2020, Ouyang entered a Super Rookie Cup for Wu Lin Feng in the 70 kg division that would serve as determining a new national champion while international competition wasn't possible due to the COVID-19 pandemic. In his first group stage fight he defeated Song Shaoqiu by unanimous decision at the Wu Lin Feng 2020: King's Super Cup 1st Group stage event.

Ouyang and Song Shaoqiu rematched in the final of the Super Rookie Cup on August 29, 2020, for both the Wu Lin Feng −70 kg national title and the vacant IPCC China title at Wu Lin Feng 2020: China New Kings Tournament Final. Ouyang won the fight by technical knockout in the second round with low kicks.

On November 27, 2021, Ouyang faced Han Wenbao for the third time at Wu Lin Feng 2021: World Contender League 7th Stage. He won the fight by unanimous decision with all three judges scoring the fight 29–27.

On March 26, 2022, Ouyang saw his 15 fights win streak come to an end when he faced Luo Chao for the third time in the final of a four-man tournament at Wu Lin Feng 528. He lost the fight by unanimous decision with all three judges scoring the bout 29–28.

On March 18, 2023, Ouyang defeated veteran Christian Baya by unanimous decision on Wu Lin Feng 535: China vs Netherlands.

On May 6, 2023, Ouyang defeated Arman from Armenia by technical knockout in the first round at the 2023 Huya Kung Fu Carnival.

Ouyang faced Anatoly Moiseev for the Wu Lin Feng −70 kg title on July 29, 2023, at Wu Lin Feng 540. He won the fight by first-round knockout with low kicks.

=== K-1 ===
Ouyang was scheduled to challenge Hiromi Wajima for his K-1 Super Welterweight title on December 9, 2023, at K-1 ReBIRTH 2. He won the fight by second-round knockout.

Ouyang faced the former Glory Lightweight champion Davit Kiria at Wu Lin Feng 2024: 12th Global Kung Fu Festival on January 27, 2024. He won the fight by a second-round technical knockout.

On February 8, 2024, it was announced that Feng would be one of sixteen participants of the K-1 World MAX 2024 - World Tournament Opening Round where he would face Pascal Schroth on March 20, 2024. Feng won the fight by unanimous decision.

On October 26, 2024, Ouyang took part in a 4-man tournament at Wu Lin Feng 549. In the semifinals he defeated Johannes Baas by unanimous decision. In the final he defeated Aleksei Ulianov by unanimous decision after scoring a knockdown in the second round and qualified for the Wu Lin Feng World MAX Tournament Final.

Ouyang faced Luo Chao in the semifinals of the 2025 Wu Lin Feng World MAX 70 kg Tournament at Wu Lin Feng 2025 Global Kung Fu Festival on January 25, 2025. He won the fight by unanimous decision and advanced to the tournament finals where he faced Han Wenbao. Ouyang won the fight and the tournament title by unanimous decision.

Ouyang made his first K-1 Super Welterweight (−70kg) title defense against Darryl Verdonk at K-1 Beyond on May 31, 2025. He retained the title by unanimous decision.

Ouyang faced Kacper Muszyński in the 2025 K-1 World MAX Qualifier bout at K-1 World MAX 2025 - World Tournament Opening Round on September 7, 2025. He won the fight by majority decision.

Ouyang faced Jonas Salsicha in the quarterfinals of the 2025 K-1 World MAX at K-1 World MAX 2025 - World Championship Tournament Final on November 15, 2025. He lost the fight by unanimous decision, with scores of 27—30, 27—30 and 28—30.

== Titles and accomplishments ==
=== Kickboxing ===
- K-1
  - 2023 K-1 Super Welterweight (−70kg) Champion
    - One successful title defense
  - 2023 K-1 Awards Knockout of the Year (vs. Hiromi Wajima)
- Wu Lin Feng
  - 2020 Wu Lin Feng China −70 kg Champion
  - 2021 Wu Lin Feng Fighter of the Year
  - 2023 Wu Lin Feng World −70 kg Champion
    - One successful title defense
  - 2025 Wu Lin Feng World MAX 70 kg Tournament Winner
- International Professional Combat Council
  - 2020 IPCC China −70 kg Champion
- EM Legend
  - 2018 EM Legend -70 kg Tournament Winner

=== Sanda ===
- Amateur Sanda
  - 2015 Anhui Provincial Sanda Championship (gold) -70 kg
  - 2016 Anhui Provincial Sanda Championship (gold) -75 kg

== Kickboxing record ==
Professional Kickboxing Record
47 Wins (22 (T)KOs), 4 Losses, 0 Draw, 1 No Contest
Date	Result	Opponent	Event	Location	Method	Round	Time
2026-10-05	Win	(Thailand) Sudsakorn Sor Klinmee	Zhijin International Combat Sports : China vs Thailand	Zhijin, China	TKO (3 knockdowns)	2	1:26
2026-05-16	Win	(Ukraine) Taras Hnatchuk	Wu Lin Feng 556	Pingdingshan, China	Decision (Unanimous)	5	3:00
Defends the Wu Lin Feng World -70kg title.
2026-02-07	Win	(Russia) Andrey Elin	Wu Lin Feng 2026 Global Kung Fu Festival	Zhengzhou, China	Decision (Unanimous)	3	3:00
2025-11-15	Loss	(Brazil) Jonas Salsicha	K-1 World MAX 2025 - World Championship Tournament Final, Quarterfinals	Tokyo, Japan	Decision (Unanimous)	3	3:00
2025-09-07	Win	(Poland) Kacper Muszyński	K-1 World MAX 2025 - World Tournament Opening Round	Tokyo, Japan	Decision (Majority)	3	3:00
Qualifies for K-1 World MAX 2025 World Championship Tournament Final.
2025-05-31	Win	(Netherlands) Darryl Verdonk	K-1 Beyond	Yokohama, Japan	Decision (Unanimous)	3	3:00
Defends the K-1 Super Welterweight (−70kg) title.
2025-01-25	Win	(China) Han Wenbao	Wu Lin Feng 2025 Global Kung Fu Festival - MAX Tournament, Final	Tangshan, China	Decision (Unanimous)	3	3:00
Wins the 2025 Wu Lin Feng World MAX 70kg Tournament Final.
2025-01-25	Win	(China) Luo Chao	Wu Lin Feng 2025 Global Kung Fu Festival - MAX Tournament, Semifinals	Tangshan, China	Decision (Unanimous)	3	3:00
2024-10-26	Win	(Russia) Aleksei Ulianov	Wu Lin Feng 549 - MAX Qualifier Tournament, Final	Tangshan, China	Decision (Unanimous)	3	3:00
Qualifies for Wu Lin Feng World MAX Tournament Final.
2024-10-26	Win	(Germany) Johannes Baas	Wu Lin Feng 549 - MAX Qualifier Tournament, Semifinals	Tangshan, China	Decision (Unanimous)	3	3:00
2024-03-20	Win	(Germany) Pascal Schroth	K-1 World MAX 2024 - World Tournament Opening Round	Tokyo, Japan	Decision (Unanimous)	3	3:00
Qualifies for K-1 World MAX 2024 World Championship Final. Withdrew due to injury
2024-01-27	Win	(Georgia (country)) Davit Kiria	Wu Lin Feng 2024: 12th Global Kung Fu Festival	Tangshan, China	TKO (Low kicks)	3	0:23
2023-12-09	Win	(Japan) Hiromi Wajima	K-1 ReBIRTH 2	Osaka, Japan	KO (Right cross)	2	2:13
Wins the K-1 Super Welterweight (−70kg) title.
2023-07-29	Win	(Russia) Anatoly Moiseev	Wu Lin Feng 540: China vs Russia	Tangshan, China	KO (Right low kick)	1	
Wins the Wu Lin Feng 70kg World title.
2023-05-06	Win	(Armenia) Arman	Huya Kung Fu Carnival	Tianjin, China	TKO (3 Knockdowns)	1	
2023-03-18	Win	(Netherlands) Christian Baya	Wu Lin Feng 535: China vs Netherlands	Tangshan, China	Decision (Unanimous)	3	3:00
2022-12-09	Win	(China) Luo Chao	Wu Lin Feng 532, Final	Zhengzhou, China	Decision	3	3:00
2022-12-09	Win	(China) Liu Lei	Wu Lin Feng 532, Semi-finals	Zhengzhou, China	Decision	3	3:00
2022-09-24	Win	(China) Wang Xin	Wu Lin Feng 531	Zhengzhou, China	KO (Knee)	1	
2022-03-26	Loss	(China) Luo Chao	Wu Lin Feng 528, Final	Zhengzhou, China	Decision (Unanimous)	3	3:00
2022-03-26	Win	(China) Shuai Qi	Wu Lin Feng 528, Semi, Semi-finals	Zhengzhou, China	Decision (Unanimous)	3	3:00
2022-01-01	Win	(China) Luo Chao	Wu Lin Feng 527	Tangshan, China	Decision (Unanimous)	3	3:00
2021-11-27	Win	(China) Han Wenbao	Wu Lin Feng 2021: World Contender League 7th Stage	Zhengzhou, China	Decision (Unanimous)	3	3:00
2021-10-30	Win	(China) Luo Chao	Wu Lin Feng 2021: WLF on Haihua Island	Daizhou, China	Decision (Unanimous)	3	3:00
2021-09-30	Win	(China) Xu Liu	Wu Lin Feng 2021: World Contender League 6th Stage	Zhengzhou, China	TKO	1	
2021-07-03	Win	(China) Chen Yonghui	Wu Lin Feng 2021: World Contender League 5th Stage	Zhengzhou, China	Decision (Unanimous)	3	3:00
2021-05-15	Win	(China) Han Wenbao	Huya Kung Fu Carnival 4	Zhengzhou, China	Decision (Unanimous)	3	3:00
2021-04-24	Win	(China) Wu Shijie	Wu Lin Feng 2021: World Contender League 2nd Stage	Zhengzhou, China	TKO (Low kicks)	2	
2021-03-27	Win	(China) Han Wenbao	Wu Lin Feng 2021: World Contender League 1st Stage	China	Decision	3	3:00
2021-01-23	Win	(China) Liu Lei	Wu Lin Feng 2021: Global Kung Fu Festival	Macao, China	KO (High kick)	3	
2020-11-28	Win	(China) Li Jiesheng	Wu Lin Feng 2020: China 70kg Championship Tournament	Zhengzhou, China	KO	1	1:58
2020-08-29	Win	(China) Song Shaoqiu	Wu Lin Feng 2020: China New Kings Tournament Final	Zhengzhou, China	TKO (Low kicks)	2	2:32
Wins the vacant Wu Lin Feng China and IPCC China −70 kg titles.
2020-08-03	Win	(China) Ji Xiang	Wu Lin Feng 2020: King's Super Cup 4th Group stage	Zhengzhou, China	Ext.R Decision	4	3:00
2020-06-13	Win	(China) Wu Xuesong	Wu Lin Feng 2020: King's Super Cup 2nd Group stage	Zhengzhou, China	TKO	1	
2020-05-15	Win	(China) Song Shaoqiu	Wu Lin Feng 2020: King's Super Cup 1st Group stage	Zhengzhou, China	Decision (Unanimous)	3	3:00
2019-11-30	Loss	(Serbia) Dragan Cimesa	WLF −67kg World Cup 2019–2020 6th Group stage	Zhengzhou, China	Decision	3	3:00
2019-11-03	Win	(China) Cheng Yang	Kunlun Professional League	Tongling, China	KO (High kick)	2	
2019-10-20	Win	(Thailand) Feikaw	Kunlun Fight	China	TKO (Referee stoppage)	2	1:50
2019-10-03	Loss	(Belarus) Dzianis Zuev	Kunlun Fight 86	Tongliao, China	Decision (Unanimous)	3	3:00
2019-09-13	Win	(China) Ren Yawei	Kunlun Fight 82	Zunyi, China	TKO (Referee stoppage)	2	2:05
2019-05-12	NC	(China) Wang Wei	Kunlun Professional League	Tongling, China	Doctor stoppage (low blow)	3	1:37
2018-12-14	Win	(China) Zhou Lin	The Legend of Emei 34, Final	Sichuan, China	Decision (Decision (Unanimous))	3	3:00
Wins the EM-Legend 70 kg tournament.
2018-12-14	Win	(China) Hao Menghui	The Legend of Emei 34, Semi-finals	Sichuan, China	KO (Hight Kick)	1	2:34
2018-12-08	Win	(United States) Arthur	LONG TENG SHENG SHI	Zhangjiagang, China	Decision (Unanimous)	3	3:00
2018-12-01	Win	(China) Yang Xueyong	Kunlun Fight	Tongling, China	TKO (Corner stoppage)	3	1:42
2018-11-21	Win	(China) Liang Yuanhao	Kunlun Fight	Tongling, China	KO (Punches)	1	2:56
2018-11-05	Win	(China) Guan Yirui	Kunlun Fight	Tongling, China	TKO		
2018-10-17	Win	(China) Chao Dailong	Kunlun Professional League Finals	Tongling, China	TKO (Left hook)	1	1:40
2018-10-04	Win	(China) Alimu Abulimiti	Kunlun Fight	Tongling, China	KO	1	1:30
2018-06-23	Win	(Iran) Bahrami	Kunlun Fight	Anhui, China	TKO	1	
Legend: Win Loss Draw/No contest Notes

== See also ==
- List of male kickboxers
