= Chhoeung Lvai =

Kun khmer fighter and Kickboxer

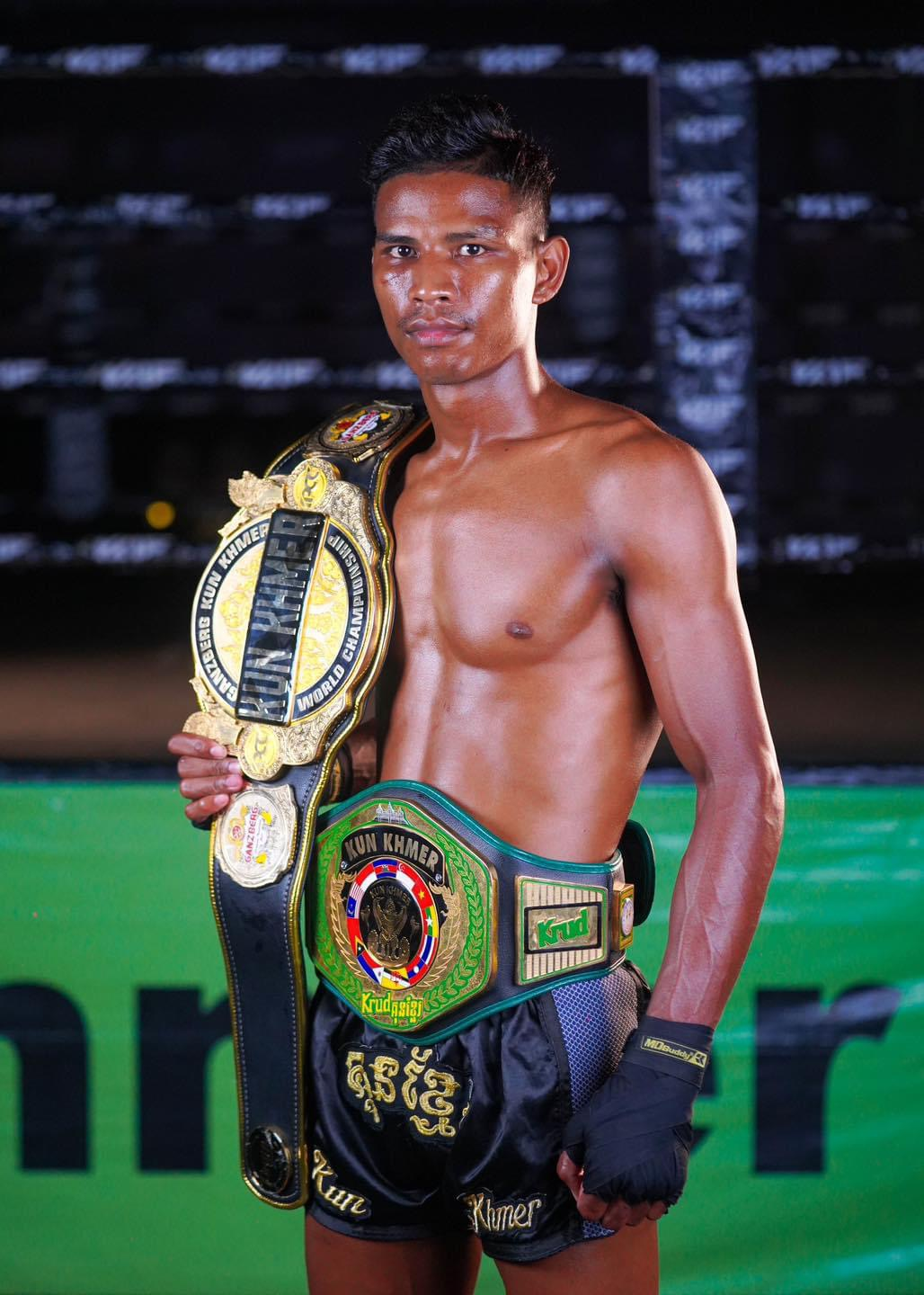
- Chhoeung Lvai at his KKIF training club
- Born: May 8, 1997 (age 29); Sambo Prei kuk, Santuk District, Kampong Thom province, Cambodia
- Nickname: Black Dragon
- Nationality: Khmer
- Height: 1.85 m (6 ft 1 in)
- Weight: 72 kg (159 lb; 11 st 5 lb)
- Style: Kun Khmer; Kun Bokator; Kickboxing
- Team: Kun Khmer International Fighting Gym
- Trainer: Long Salavong(former coach); Svay Sokhon
- Years active: 2017-Present

Kickboxing record
- Total: 91
- Wins: 65
- By knockout: 28
- Losses: 22
- Draws: 04

Other information
- Occupation: martial artist

Chhoeung Lvai (Khmer: ឈឿង ល្វៃ), (born 8 May 1997) is a Cambodian kickboxer and Kun Khmer fighter. The Kampuchea Thmey Daily listed him as a top 10 Kun Khmer boxer for 2024. In 2023, he won the gold medal at the 32nd SEA Games in low kick kickboxing. He is the ISKA Kun Khmer World Light-middle champion(72.5 kg)

== Background ==
Chhoeung Lvai is originally from Kampong Thom province from a poor family. After finishing 8th grade, he went to work to financially support his family. He used to work as a truck driver.

Chhoeung Lvai got interested in becoming a boxer after watching a match between Keo Rumchong and Long Sophy. In 2017, he started training in boxing at the age of 20. When he first started boxing, his family didn't want him to pursue boxing as a career and had to pursue training secretly. He first started boxing at Coach Long Salavong's club. He first had difficulty finding a boxing gym and had to ask around. In 2019, he switch to the boxing club of Pradal Neakareach Chaktomuk under Coach Svay Sokhon. Chhoeung Lvai now is training at Kun Khmer International Fight Gym (KKIF). Chhoeung Lvai was nicknamed as "black dragon" by his fans.

== Career ==
=== Low Kick Kickboxing ===
At the 31st Southeast Asian Games, Chhoueng Lvai defeated Singaporean martial artist Nazri Sutari in the quarter finals of the men's low kick kickboxing quarter finals at 71 kg. His opponent, Nazri, was a Sambo gold medalist from the 2019 games. Chhoeung Lvai defeated Honorio Banario in the semi-finals of the men's low kick kickboxing at 71 kg. His opponent, Banario, was a former ONE FC featherweight champion. Chhoeung Lvai lost to Thongchai Thapphli in the 71 kg finals match which resulted in a silver medal for Chhoeung Lvai.

Medal record

Men's Kickboxing

Representing Cambodia

Southeast Asian Games
Silver medal – second place	2021 Hanoi	Men's 71 kg, Low kick
Gold medal – first place	2023 Phnom Penh	Men's 71 kg, Low kick

Asian Kickboxing Championship
Silver medal – second place	2022 Bangkok	Men's 75 kg, Low kick

At the 2022 Asian Kickboxing Championship, Chhoeung Lvai won a silver medal.

Chhoeung Lvai said his toughest opponents for the 32nd Southeast Asian Games would be the Philippines and Thailand. He said he trained hard and improved his technical ability a lot since the SEA Games in Vietnam. At the 2023 Southeast Asian Games(SEA Games) kickboxing tournament, Chhoeung Lvai beat Thai boxer Tonphonsi Thanaphat by points in the 71 kg weight class making it the first time he won a gold medal at the SEA Games.

=== Kun Khmer ===
The National Television of Cambodia organized an event at Siem Reap for the Khmer New Year in 2023. There was a controversial match between Chhoeung Lvai and Thai boxer Sammy Banchamek. Chhoeung Lvai's leg was injured in the match. Cambodian Prime Minister Hun Sen issued a message that boxers competing in the SEA games should not compete in other boxing events until the SEA games finish. He also ask the Cambodian Kun Khmer federation to address the issue to avoid incidents that could affect participation in the SEA games. People on Facebook criticized and accused the referee of favoring the side of Sammy Banchamek. The Prime Minister asked people to stop debating the match on social media.

On September 30, 2023 at Town Arena, Chhoeung Lvai was victorious over Italian boxer Matin Meoni.

On December 10, 2023, the Bare Knuckle Kombat Championship hosted their first Kun Khmer event in Phnom Penh, Cambodia and Lvai participated in the inaugural event.

Chhoeung Lvai was scheduled a for a title bout against Brazilian fighter Machado Bento who is a Rajadamnern Stadium world series champion of Thailand. Chhoeung Lvai won the match and the IPCC Ganzberg Kun Khmer world championship by decision.

On Saturday, January 20, 2024, Chhoeung Lvai claimed a knockout victor over Iranian boxer Hamidreza Mehrabloo in the second round.

Chhoeung Lvai of Cambodia fought Jay Tonkin of Australia, a WMO Australian Middleweight Champion, for the ISKA Kun Khmer World Light-middle title(72.5 kg). Chhoeung Lvai had a unanimous decision victory.

The Kampuchea Thmey Daily listed him as a top 10 Kun Khmer boxer for 2024. He had more than 10 fights in 2024 and only lost two. He became the only Khmer martial artist to win two belts in Hong Kong. He won the World Super-4 Marthon 72 kg title. He also won a gold medal at the 2024 Samdech Thipadei Championship.

=== Muay Thai ===
On March 13, 2024, Chhoeung Lvai was selected to join World Muay Thai Grandprix, organized by I-1 World Muaythai Championship, which took place in Hong Kong, China.

Chhoeung Lvai defeated his opponents Fahsang by TKO. The World Super-4 Champion Final 72Kg, Chhoeung Lvai defeated his opponent Elysee Kochiese by unanimous decision in the 72 kg final and became World Muay Thai Champion Belt.

== Accomplishments ==
- ISKA Kun Khmer World Light-middle champion (72.5 kg)
- 2023 Southeast Asian Games Low kick - Kickboxing Men's 71 kg - Gold medal
- Gold World Muaythai Champion Belt from I-1 World Muaythai Champion Hong Kong

== Fight record ==
Kun Khmer record
Total Fights: 80 fights, 50 wins, 25 losses, 05 draws
Date	Result	Opponent	Event	Location	Method	Round	Time
January 17, 2026	Win	(Iran) Kian Rezazadeh	Kun Khmer on Bayon TV	Cambodia	KO	1	1:10
June 28, 2025	Loss	(France) Abdallah Vakasseni	Hang Meas Kun Khmer	Phnom Penh, Cambodia	Decision	5	
May 17, 2025	Win	(Algeria) Ayoub Bari	Bayon Television	Phnom Penh, Cambodia	Decision	3	
October 12, 2024	Loss	(Iran) Mortaza Seififard	PNN Sports	Phnom Penh, Cambodia	TKO	3	
September 29, 2024	Win	(France) Leo Aranha	Bayon Television	Phnom Penh, Cambodia	TKO (elbow strike)	1	1:01
July 26, 2024	Win	(Iran) Ali Khodarahml	Kizz Kun Khmer	Cambodia	TKO (elbow strike)	1	1:58
June 2, 2024	Loss	(France) Omar Samb	Kun Khmer Super Fight 2: Bordeaux	Bordeaux, France	KO	2	2:35
April 28, 2024	Win	(Thailand) Kongjak Por Pao In (Chaiwat Mueanphong)	Ganzberg Kun Khmer Super Strike PNN Arena	Phnom Penh, Cambodia	Decision	5	3:00
April 14, 2024	Win	(Australia) Jayy Tonkin	CTN Boxing-ISKA Kun Khmer World Championship	Ksach Kandal, Cambodia	Decision	5	3:00
February 24, 2024	Win	(Thailand) Detrit Kraisraphop	Cambodia Kun Khmer KKIF BTV Arena	Arey Ksat, Phnom Penh	Decision	3	3:00
February 18, 2024	Win	(Russia) Dmitriy Dmitriyev	Kun Khmer Warriors Town Arena	Bati, Takeo	Decision	3	3:00
February 3, 2024	Win	(Iran) Ali Khodaarhami	Cambodia Kun Khmer KKIF BTV Arena	Prey Veng,Cambodia	TKO	01	00:40
January 20, 2024	Win	(Iran) Hamidreza Mehrabloo	Cambodia Kun Khmer KKIF BTV Arena	Siem Reap,Cambodia	TKO	01	0:54
January 7, 2024	Win	(Russia) Masoud Moghimian	Krud Kun Khmer TVK arena	kampong Chhnang City, Kampong Chhnang	Decision	3	3:00
December 21, 2023	Win	(Brazil) Machado Bento	IPCC Ganzberg Kun Khmer World Championship Town Arena	Phnom Penh,Cambodia	Split Decision	03	3:00
December 10, 2023	Win	(Brazil) Vitor Camarogo	Cambodia Kun Khmer KKIF BTV Arena	Phnom Penh,Cambodia	TKO	01	1:38
November 28, 2023	Win	(Turkey) Unal Burak	Krud Kun Khmer TVK Arena	Phnom Penh,Cambodia	TKO	02	0:23
August 27, 2023	Win	(Thailand) Den Saiyam K.Kampanat (ก้องสยาม ก.กัมปนาท)	Champion Kun Khmer Town Arena	Phnom Penh, Cambodia	TKO	01	00:42
February 18, 2023	Loss	(Cambodia) Thoeun Theara	Krud Kun Khmer Championship Final	Cambodia	TKO	1	0:50
February 18, 2023	Win	(Scotland) Alex Scott	Krud Kun Khmer Championship Semi-Final	Phnom Penh, Cambodia	Decision	3	3:00
January 28, 2023	Win	(Thailand) Satanfah Rachanon	Town Boxing	Battambang, Cambodia	TKO	03	1:25
November 13, 2022	Win	(Iran) Aliriza Amizadet	Town Boxing	Phnom Penh, Cambodia	TKO (elbow strike)	1	5:32
August 29, 2020	Win	(Cambodia) Vong Vichhai	CTN Boxing	Phnom Penh, Cambodia	Decision	05	

Kickboxing record
Date	Result	Opponent	Event	Location	Method	Round	Time
July 10, 2026	Win	(China) Yue Shuai	TV5	Cambodia	Decision	3	
April 10, 2022	Win	(China) Han Wenbao	Wu Lin Feng 2022: WLF in Cambodia	Siem Reap, Cambodia	KO	1	
Legend: Win Loss Draw/no contest Notes

Muay Thai record
Date	Result	Opponent	Event	Location	Method	Round	Time
March 12, 2024	Win	(Germany) Elysee Kochiese	World Super-4 Champion 72Kg	Hong Kong, China	Decision	3	03:00
March 12, 2024	Win	(Thailand) Fahsang	World Super-4 Champion 72Kg	Hong Kong, China	TKO	1	02:25
Legend: Win Loss Draw/no contest Notes
