= 2023 in Wu Lin Feng =

Chinese kickboxing events

Information
- First date: February 4
- Last date: TBD

Events
- Total events: TBD

Fights
- Total fights: TBD
- Title fights: TBD

The year 2023 is the 20th year in the history of the Wu Lin Feng, a Chinese kickboxing promotion. The events are broadcast on Henan Television in mainland China and streamed on Douyin and Xigua Video.

== List of events ==
| No. | Event | Date | Venue | City |
|---|---|---|---|---|
| 1 | Wu Lin Feng 533: China vs Thailand | February 3, 2023 | | Tangshan, China |
| 2 | Wu Lin Feng 2023: Chinese New Year | February 4, 2023 | | Tangshan, China |
| 3 | Wu Lin Feng 535: China vs Netherlands | March 18, 2023 | | Tangshan, China |

== Wu Lin Feng 533: China vs. Thailand ==
Wu Lin Feng
- Promotion: Wu Lin Feng
- Date: February 3, 2023
- City: Tangshan, China

Wu Lin Feng 533: China vs. Thailand was a kickboxing event held on February 3, 2023, in Tangshan, China.

=== Background ===
The event featured a "China vs. Thailand" theme, with five Chinese fighters facing five Thai fighters.

=== Results ===
| Weight Class | | | | Method | Round | Time | Notes |
|---|---|---|---|---|---|---|---|
| Kickboxing -57 kg | (China) Liu Zhipeng | def. | (Thailand) Suesat Paeminburi | Decision (Unanimous) | 3 | 3:00 | |
| Kickboxing -63 kg | (China) Yang Ming | def. | (Thailand) Pinpetch Banchamek | Decision | 3 | 3:00 | |
| Kickboxing -64 kg | (Thailand) Sueablack MTA | def. | (China) Han Tianxiang | Decision | 3 | 3:00 | |
| Kickboxing -65 kg | (China) Wei Weiyang | def. | (Thailand) Buadin Banchamek | Decision (Unanimous) | 3 | 3:00 | |
| Kickboxing -67 kg | (China) Zhang Kui | def. | (Thailand) Piyaphon | Decision (Unanimous) | 3 | 3:00 | |
| Kickboxing -63 kg | (China) Ji Zhize | def. | (China) Song Kaiwen | Decision (Unanimous) | 3 | 3:00 | |

== Wu Lin Feng 2023: Chinese New Year ==
Wu Lin Feng
- Promotion: Wu Lin Feng
- Date: February 4, 2023
- City: Tangshan, China

Wu Lin Feng 2023: Chinese New Year or Wu Lin Feng 534 was a kickboxing event held on February 4, 2023, in Tangshan, China.

=== Background ===
A featherweight bout between former K-1 Lightweight Champion Wei Rui and current DFS Lightweight Champion Adrian Maxim is expected to headline the event.

A -67 kilogram Wu Lin Feng World Tournament took place at the event, featuring five domestic and three foreign competitors.

=== Results ===
| Weight Class | | | | Method | Round | Time | Notes |
|---|---|---|---|---|---|---|---|
| Kickboxing -67 kg | (China) Han Wenbao | def. | (China) Zhou Jiaqiang | TKO (Corner stoppage) | 2 | | Wu Lin Feng -67 kg World Tournament Final |
| Kickboxing -65 kg | (China) Wei Rui | def. | (Romania) Adrian Maxim | Decision (Unanimous) | 3 | 3:00 | |
| Kickboxing -77 kg | (China) Li Hui | def. | (Madagascar) Mahery Rakotonirina | Decision | 3 | 3:00 | |
| Kickboxing -67 kg | (China) Han Wenbao | def. | (China) Shang Xifeng | Decision (Unanimous) | 3 | 3:00 | Wu Lin Feng -67 kg World Tournament Semi Final |
| Kickboxing -67 kg | (China) Zhou Jiaqiang | def. | (China) Meng Gaofeng | Decision | 3 | 3:00 | Wu Lin Feng -67 kg World Tournament Semi Final |
| Kickboxing -65 kg | (Belarus) Maksim Petkevich | def. | (China) Zhu Shuai | Decision (Unanimous) | 3 | 3:00 | |
| Kickboxing -70 kg | (China) Luo Chao | def. | (Russia) Vladimir Shuliak | Decision (Unanimous) | 3 | 3:00 | |
| Kickboxing -67 kg | (China) Shang Xifeng | def. | (China) Zhang Kui | Decision | 3 | 3:00 | Wu Lin Feng -67 kg World Tournament Quarter Final |
| Kickboxing -67 kg | (China) Han Wenbao | def. | (Spain) Mikel Sortino | Decision (Unanimous) | 3 | 3:00 | Wu Lin Feng -67 kg World Tournament Quarter Final |
| Kickboxing -67 kg | (China) Meng Gaofeng | def. | (Portugal) Diego Freitas | Decision (Unanimous) | 3 | 3:00 | Wu Lin Feng -67 kg World Tournament Quarter Final |
| Kickboxing -67 kg | (China) Zhou Jiaqiang | def. | (Georgia (country)) Giorgi Malania | Decision | 3 | 3:00 | Wu Lin Feng -67 kg World Tournament Quarter Final |
| Kickboxing -90 kg | (China) Liu Ce | def. | (Serbia) Nemanja Knezic | TKO (Right Low Kick) | 2 | 2:13 | |
| Kickboxing -61 kg | (China) Huang Shuailu | def. | (Georgia (country)) Tsotne Sultanishvili | Decision (Unanimous) | 3 | 3:00 | |
| Kickboxing -61 kg | (Iran) Ali Zarinfar | def. | (China) Zhao Chongyang | Decision | 3 | 3:00 | |

== Wu Lin Feng 535: China vs Netherlands ==
Wu Lin Feng 535
- Promotion: Wu Lin Feng
- Date: March 18, 2023
- City: Tangshan, China

Wu Lin Feng 535: China vs Netherlands was a kickboxing event held on March 18, 2023, in Tangshan, China.

=== Background ===
A "China vs. Netherlands" themed series of fights were held at the event, which saw a number of Chinese Wu Lin Feng contracted fighters face fighters from Netherlands.

=== Results ===
| Weight Class | | | | Method | Round | Time | Notes |
|---|---|---|---|---|---|---|---|
| Kickboxing -70 kg | (China) Ouyang Feng | def. | (Netherlands) Christian Baya | Decision (Unanimous) | 3 | 3:00 | |
| Kickboxing -73.5 kg | (China) Han Wenbao | def. | (Netherlands) Younes Smaili | Decision | 3 | 3:00 | |
| Kickboxing Women -56 kg | (China) Li Mingrui | def. | (Netherlands) Ella Maria Grapperhaus | Decision (Unanimous) | 3 | 3:00 | |
| Kickboxing -70 kg | (China) Xu Jian | def. | (Netherlands) Anass Aaras | Decision | 3 | 3:00 | |
| Kickboxing -67 kg | (China) Kong Dexiang | def. | (Netherlands) Jess van Hunen | Decision (Unanimous) | 3 | 3:00 | |
| Kickboxing -63 kg | (China) Shun Li | def. | (Netherlands) Ahmed Akoudad | Decision | 3 | 3:00 | |
| Kickboxing -63 kg | (China) Zhao Chongyang | def. | (Thailand) Piyanan | Decision | 3 | 3:00 | |

== Wu Lin Feng 536: China vs Japan ==
Wu Lin Feng 536
- Promotion: Wu Lin Feng
- Date: April 22, 2023
- City: Tangshan, China

Wu Lin Feng 536: China vs Japan was a kickboxing event held on April 22, 2023, in Tangshan, China.

=== Background ===
A super lightweight (-65 kg) bout between Wei Rui and Hisaki Higashimoto was scheduled as the headliner of a "China versus Japan" themed event.

=== Results ===
| Weight Class | | | | Method | Round | Time | Notes |
|---|---|---|---|---|---|---|---|
| Kickboxing -65 kg | (China) Wei Rui | def. | (Japan) Hisaki Higashimoto | Decision (Unanimous) | 3 | 3:00 | |
| Kickboxing -61 kg | (China) Zhang Kui | def. | (Japan) Takahiko Kobayashi | KO | 2 | | |
| Kickboxing -60 kg | (Japan) Narufumi Nishimoto | def. | (China) Pan Jin | Decision (Unanimous) | 3 | 3:00 | |
| Kickboxing -60 kg | (China) Yang Hua | def. | (Japan) Shoya Masumoto | TKO (Corner stoppage) | 3 | | |
| Kickboxing -57.5 kg | (Japan) Shoki Kaneda | def. | (China) Liu Zhipeng | Decision (Unanimous) | 3 | 3:00 | |
| Kickboxing Women -54 kg | (China) Liu Yuer | def. | (Japan) Nanami | Decision (Unanimous) | 3 | 3:00 | |
| Kickboxing -61 kg | (China) Zewa Liluo | def. | (Japan) Ryoga Matsumoto | Decision (Unanimous) | 3 | 3:00 | |
| Kickboxing -63 kg | (China) Ji Zhize | def. | (China) Han Tianxiang | Ext.R Decision (Unanimous) | 4 | 3:00 | |

== Wu Lin Feng 537 ==
Wu Lin Feng 537
- Promotion: Wu Lin Feng
- Date: May 2, 2023
- City: Tangshan, China

Wu Lin Feng 537 was a kickboxing event held on May 2, 2023, in Tangshan, China.

=== Background ===
A Wu Lin Feng World super featherweight championship bout between champion Hirotaka Asahisa and the Wu Lin Feng China super featherweight titleholder Yang Ming was booked as the event headliner.

=== Results ===
| Weight Class | | | | Method | Round | Time | Notes |
|---|---|---|---|---|---|---|---|
| Kickboxing -63 kg | (China) Jin Ying | def. | (China) Wei Weiyang | Decision (Unanimous) | 3 | 3:00 | Wu Lin Feng -63kg Asia Tournament Final |
| Kickboxing -60 kg | (Japan) Hirotaka Asahisa (c) | def. | (China) Yang Ming | Decision | 5 | 3:00 | For the Wu Lin Feng World -60kg title. |
| Kickboxing -58 kg | (China) Lang Shangten | def. | (South Korea) Ku Tae Won | KO | 2 | | |
| Kickboxing -63 kg | (China) Jin Ying | def. | (Japan) Yuki Masui | Decision (Unanimous) | 3 | 3:00 | Wu Lin Feng -63kg Asia Tournament Semi Final |
| Kickboxing -63 kg | (China) Wei Weiyang | def. | (China) Zhang Jingtao | KO (low kick) | 1 | | Wu Lin Feng -63kg Asia Tournament Semi Final |
| Kickboxing -58 kg | (China) Huang Qirui | def. | (Japan) Taimu Hisai | Decision (Unanimous) | 3 | 3:00 | |
| Kickboxing -68 kg | (China) Shang Xifeng | def. | (China) Zhou Haoran | Decision | 3 | 3:00 | |
| Kickboxing -63 kg | (China) Zhang Jingtao | def. | (Russia) Dmitrii Ivanov | Decision | 3 | 3:00 | Wu Lin Feng -63kg Asia Tournament Quarter Final |
| Kickboxing -63 kg | (Japan) Yuki Masui | def. | (South Korea) Seo Yu Hyeon | Decision (Unanimous) | 3 | 3:00 | Wu Lin Feng -63kg Asia Tournament Quarter Final |
| Kickboxing -63 kg | (China) Jin Ying | def. | (Russia) Abdulmalik Mugidinov | TKO (Straight to body) | 1 | | Wu Lin Feng -63kg Asia Tournament Quarter Final |
| Kickboxing -63 kg | (China) Wei Weiyang | def. | (South Korea) Kim Woo Seung | Decision (Unanimous) | 3 | 3:00 | Wu Lin Feng -63kg Asia Tournament Quarter Final |
| Kickboxing -64 kg | (China) Fang Gejin | def. | (China) Song Kaiwen | Decision | 3 | 3:00 | |
| Kickboxing -67 kg | (China) Wu Jiaxin | vs. | (China) Miao Aoqi | | | | |

== Wu Lin Feng 538 ==
Wu Lin Feng 538
- Promotion: Wu Lin Feng
- Date: May 27, 2023
- City: Tangshan, China

Wu Lin Feng 538 was a kickboxing event held on May 27, 2023, in Tangshan, China.

=== Background ===
A -70 kg bout between Han Wenbao and promotional newcomer Alexander Skvortsov served as the main event.

=== Results ===
| Weight Class | | | | Method | Round | Time | Notes |
|---|---|---|---|---|---|---|---|
| Kickboxing -70 kg | (China) Han Wenbao | def. | (Russia) Alexander Skvortsov | Decision (Unanimous) | 3 | 3:00 | |
| Kickboxing -77 kg | (France) James Condé | def. | (China) Xu Yuanqing | Decision | 3 | 3:00 | |
| Kickboxing -62 kg | (China) Zhao Chongyang | def. | (China) Pan Jing | KO (Low kick) | 1 | 2:30 | |
| Kickboxing Women -53.5 kg | (China) Li Lishan | def. | (South Korea) Choi Eun-Ji | Decision | 3 | 3:00 | |
| Kickboxing -71 kg | (China) Luo Chao | def. | (China) Chen Yonghui | Decision | 3 | 3:00 | |
| Kickboxing -75 kg | (China) Liu Mengyang | def. | (China) Tan Xiaofeng | Decision | 3 | 3:00 | |
| Kickboxing -75 kg | (China) Ji Longfeng | vs. | (China) Huang Yuanzhe | | | | |
| Kickboxing -67 kg | (China) Cai Jiehui | def. | (China) Liu Jie | KO (body kcik) | 1 | | |
| Kickboxing -64 kg | (China) Han Tianxiang | vs. | (China) Chen Xiaofan | | | | |
| Kickboxing -61 kg | (China) Li Jianglong | vs. | (China) Tong Kelei | | | | |

== Wu Lin Feng 539 ==
Wu Lin Feng 539
- Promotion: Wu Lin Feng
- Date: June 24, 2023
- City: Tangshan, China

Wu Lin Feng 539 was a kickboxing event held on June 24, 2023, in Tangshan, China.

=== Background ===
A 68 kg catchweight bout between the 2019 WLF 67 kg World Cup winner Jia Aoqi and David Mejia was booked as the event headliner.

=== Results ===
| Weight Class | | | | Method | Round | Time | Notes |
|---|---|---|---|---|---|---|---|
| Kickboxing 69 kg | (Colombia) David Mejia | def. | (China) Jia Aoqi | Decision | 3 | 3:00 | |
| Kickboxing 62 kg | (China) Zhao Chongyang | def. | (Thailand) Mongkolpetch Petchyindee Academy | Decision (Majority) | 3 | 3:0 | |
| Kickboxing 64 kg | (China) Zhu Shuai | def. | (Romania) Adrian Maxim | TKO (Low Kicks) | 3 | 1:12 | |
| Kickboxing 56 kg | (China) Wang Junguang | def. | (Georgia (country)) Temur Tchezhia | Decision (Unanimous) | 3 | 3:00 | |
| Kickboxing 63 kg | (China) Zhang Lanpei | def. | (Greece) Angelos Martinos | Decision (Unanimous) | 3 | 3:00 | |

== Wu Lin Feng 540 ==
Wu Lin Feng 540
- Promotion: Wu Lin Feng
- Date: July 29, 2023
- City: Tangshan, China

Wu Lin Feng 540: China vs Russia was a kickboxing event held on July 29, 2023, in Tangshan, China.

=== Results ===
| Weight Class | | | | Method | Round | Time | Notes |
|---|---|---|---|---|---|---|---|
| Kickboxing 70 kg | (China) Ouyang Feng | def. | (Russia) Anatoly Moiseev (c) | KO (Low kick) | 1 | | For the Wu Lin Feng -70kg World title |
| Kickboxing 71 kg | (China) Chen Yonghui | def. | (Russia) Alexander Skvortsov | TKO | | 3 | |
| Kickboxing 67 kg | (China) Zhou Jiaqiang | def. | (Russia) Andrey Khromov | Decision (Unanimous) | 3 | 3:00 | |
| Kickboxing 67 kg | (Russia) Abdulmedzhidov Ibragim | def. | (China) Pan Jiayun | Decision (Unanimous) | 3 | 3:00 | |
| Kickboxing 65 kg | (China) Han Tianxiang | def. | (Russia) Nikolai Lazaridi | Decision (Unanimous) | 3 | 3:00 | |
| Kickboxing 67 kg | (China) Li Changbang | def. | (Russia) Mamedov Punkhan | Decision (Unanimous) | 3 | 3:00 | |
| Kickboxing 66 kg | (China) Song Kaiwen | def. | (China) Zhang Zi Hao | Decision | 3 | 3:00 | |
| Kickboxing 60 kg | (China) Huang Shuailu | def. | (France) Endy Patel | TKO (Punches) | 2 | | |
| Kickboxing 67 kg | (Georgia (country)) Elnar Valiev | def. | (China) Yang Zhen | Decision (Unanimous) | 3 | 3:00 | |
| Kickboxing 67 kg | (China) Er Kang | def. | (China) Cai Jiehui | Decision (Unanimous) | 3 | 3:00 | |
| Kickboxing 60 kg | (China) Zewa Liluo | def. | (Madagascar) Marius Odilon | Decision (Unanimous) | 3 | 3:00 | |
| Kickboxing 63 kg | (China) Wang Shenglong | def. | (China) Wang Jianmin | Ext.R Decision (Unanimous) | 4 | 3:00 | |

== Wu Lin Feng 1000th Broadcast Celebration ==
Wu Lin Feng 541
- Promotion: Wu Lin Feng
- Date: November 25, 2023
- City: Tangshan, China

Wu Lin Feng 541 or Wu Lin Feng 1000th Broadcast Celebration was a kickboxing event held on November 25, 2023, in Tangshan, China.

=== Results ===
| Weight Class | | | | Method | Round | Time | Notes |
|---|---|---|---|---|---|---|---|
| Kickboxing 65 kg | (China) Meng Gaofeng (c) | def. | (Ukraine) Serhiy Adamchuk | Decision (Unanimous) | 5 | 3:00 | For the Wu Lin Feng -65kg World title |
| Kickboxing 70 kg | (China) Tie Yinghua | def. | (Madagascar) Mickael Randrianiaina | TKO (3 Knockdowns) | 2 | | |
| Kickboxing 63 kg | (China) Zhu Shuai | def. | (Netherlands) Matthew Daalman | Decision (Unanimous) | 3 | 3:00 | |
| Kickboxing 63 kg | (China) Zhao Chongyang | def. | (Algeria) Adam Larfi | Decision (Unanimous) | 3 | 3:00 | |
| Women's Kickboxing 51 kg | (Japan) Masami | def. | (China) Chun Lei | Decision (Unanimous) | 3 | 3:00 | |
| Kickboxing 62 kg | (China) Jin Ying | def. | (Japan) Hirotaka Asahisa | Decision (Unanimous) | 3 | 3:00 | |
| Kickboxing 65 kg | (China) Shun Li | def. | (France) Lorenzo Sammartino | Decision (Unanimous) | 3 | 3:00 | |
| Kickboxing 63 kg | (China) Wei Weiyang | def. | (Russia) Ivan Rodkin | TKO (Punches) | 3 | | |
| Kickboxing 60 kg | (China) Zewa Liluo | def. | (Greece) Angelos Martinos | Decision (Unanimous) | 3 | 3:00 | |
| Women's Kickboxing 54 kg | (Brazil) Pollyana Miller | def. | (China) Xu Jiatong | Decision (Unanimous) | 3 | 3:00 | |
| Kickboxing 65 kg | (South Korea) Gi Seop Kwon | def. | (China) Song Kaiwen | Decision (Unanimous) | 3 | 3:00 | |
| Kickboxing 71 kg | (Georgia (country)) Nair Melikyan | def. | (China) Liu Yunlong | Decision (Unanimous) | 3 | 3:00 | |
| Kickboxing 80 kg | (China) Zhang Mingyang | vs. | (China) Jia Xiangming | | | | |
| Kickboxing 57 kg | (China) Zhang Shuo | vs. | (China) Wu Yutong | | | | |

== 2023 Henan TV Year-End Kung Fu Festival ==
Wu Lin Feng
- Promotion: Wu Lin Feng
- Date: December 30, 2023
- City: Zhengzhou, China

2023 Henan TV Year-End Kung Fu Festival was a kickboxing event held on December 30, 2023, in Zhengzhou, China.

=== Results ===
| Weight Class | | | | Method | Round | Time | Notes |
|---|---|---|---|---|---|---|---|
| Kickboxing 63 kg | (China) Jin Ying | def. | (Iran) Nik Karchenlianl | Decision (Unanimous) | 3 | 3:00 | |
| Kickboxing 58 kg | (China) Yang Ming | def. | (Japan) Takahito Niimi | Decision (Unanimous) | 3 | 3:00 | |
| Kickboxing 76 kg | (China) Li Hui | def. | (Russia) Vladimir Gabov | Decision (Unanimous) | 3 | 3:00 | |
| Kickboxing 65 kg | (Brazil) Matheus Correia | def. | (China) Song Kaiwen | Decision (Unanimous) | 3 | 3:00 | |
| Kickboxing 60 kg | (China) Huang Shuailu | def. | (Iran) Javad Mohammad | Decision (Unnaimous) | 3 | 3:00 | |
| Kickboxing 57 kg | (Russia) Aslanbek Zikreev | def. | (China) Ma Qiang | Decision (Unanimous) | 3 | 3:00 | |
| Kickboxing 63 kg | (China) Ji Zhize | def. | (China) Wang Penhui | Decision | 3 | 3:00 | 63kg 4-man tournament final |
| Kickboxing 67 kg | (China) Cai Jiehui | def. | (China) Li Changbang | KO (Left hook) | 1 | | 67kg 4-man tournament semifinal |
| Kickboxing 67 kg | (China) Zhang Shuai | vs. | (China) | | | | 67kg 4-man tournament semifinal |
| Kickboxing 65 kg | (China) Yi Yuxuan | def. | (China) Han Tianxiang | Decision (Unanimous) | 3 | 3:00 | 65kg 4-man tournament semifinal |
| Kickboxing 65 kg | (China) Er Kang | def. | (China) Liu Longquan | KO (Body kick) | 3 | | 65kg 4-man tournament semifinal |
| Kickboxing 63 kg | (China) Wang Penhui | def. | (China) Zhang Jingtao | Decision (unanimous) | 3 | 3:00 | 63kg 4-man tournament semifinal |
| Kickboxing 63 kg | (China) Ji Zhize | def. | (China) Li Wenlong | Decision | 3 | 3:00 | 63kg 4-man tournament semifinal |
| Kickboxing 58 kg | (China) Ke Jingjun | vs. | (China) Zhang Yong | | | | 58kg 4-man tournament semifinal |
| Kickboxing 58 kg | (China) Zewa Liluo | vs. | (China) Meng Baian | | | | 58kg 4-man tournament semifinal |

== See also ==
- 2023 in Glory
- 2023 in K-1
- 2023 in RISE
- 2023 in ONE Championship
- 2023 in Romanian kickboxing
