= Han Wenbao =

Chinese kickboxer

- Born: 韩文豹; May 17, 1997 (age 29); Handan, Hebei, China
- Height: 174 cm (5 ft 9 in)
- Weight: 67 kg (148 lb; 10.6 st)
- Style: Kickboxing
- Stance: Orthodox
- Fighting out of: Hebei, China
- Team: Chinese Xing Tian Wu Wei Crab/CFP
- Years active: 2014–present

Kickboxing record
- Total: 62
- Wins: 46
- By knockout: 8
- Losses: 16
- By knockout: 1

Han Wenbao (born May 17, 1997) is a Chinese kickboxer, currently signed with Wu Lin Feng. As of March 2023, he is ranked as the tenth best super featherweight kickboxer in the world by Combat Press.

== Professional kickboxing career ==
Han took part in the 2017 K-1 welterweight tournament, which was held at K-1 World GP 2017 Welterweight Championship Tournament on September 18, 2017. He was eliminated in the quarterfinals however, as he lost a unanimous decision to Hitoshi Tsukakoshi.

Over the course of 2021, Han was able to amass enough points in the Wu Lin Feng -70 kg World Contender League to earn himself a place in the final four tournament. Although he was able to beat Ren Guohao by unanimous decision in the semifinals at Wu Lin Feng 2021: WLF on Haihua Island on October 30, 2021, he himself suffered a unanimous decision loss at the hands of Ouyang Feng in the tournament finals at Wu Lin Feng 2021: World Contender League 7th Stage on November 27, 2021.

On March 26, 2022, Han took part in a four-man tournament at Wu Lin Feng 528. In the semifinals he lost to Luo Chao by unanimous decision.

Han participated in a one-day, eight man -67 kg tournament at Wu Lin Feng 2023: Chinese New Year on February 4, 2023. He earned his place in the finals, where he faced Zhou Jiaqiang, with unanimous decision victories over Mikel Sortino in the quarterfinals and Shang Xifeng in the semifinals. Han captured the tournament title with a second-round technical knockout of Jiaqiang.

On May 27, 2023, Han defeated Alexander Skvortsov by unanimous decision at Wu Lin Feng 538.

On July 27, 2024, Han faced Saiyok Pumpanmuang at Wu Lin Feng 546. He won the fight by unanimous decision.

On July 10, 2026, in the main event of EM Legend 51, challenger Han Wenbao defeated Thai legend Yodwicha Por.Boonsit by unanimous decision to win the EM Legend Intercontinental Championship in the 70 kg weight class, becoming the new champion.

== Championships and accomplishments ==
- Wu Lin Feng
  - 2021 WLF World -70 kg Contender League Runner-up
  - 2023 WLF World -67 kg Tournament Winner
  - 2025 Wu Lin Feng World MAX 70 kg Tournament Runner-up
- EM Legend
  - 2026 EM Legend Intercontinental 70 kg Champion

== Fight record ==
Kickboxing record
46 Wins (8 (T)KO's), 16 Losses, 0 Draws
Date	Result	Opponent	Event	Location	Method	Round	Time
2026-10-05	Win	(Thailand) Detrit Sathian Gym	Zhijin International Combat Sports : China vs Thailand	Zhijin, China	KO (calf kick)	1	
2026-07-10	Win	(Thailand) Yodwicha Por.Boonsit	EM Legend 51	Ankang, China	Decision (Unanimous)	5	3:00
Wins the EM-Legend 70 kg Intercontinental title.
2026-05-23	Loss	(Morocco) Mohammed Boutasaa	IFP Fight Series #5	Essen, Germany	TKO (Doctor stopapge)	4	
For the inaugural IFP Lightweight (-70kg) World title
2026-03-18	Loss	(Russia) Andrey Elin	YFU 92	Zhengzhou, China	Decision	3	3:00
2025-09-27	Loss	(Russia) Andrey Elin	Wu Lin Feng 554	Tianjin, China	Decision	3	3:00
2025-01-25	Loss	(China) Ouyang Feng	Wu Lin Feng 2025 Global Kung Fu Festival - MAX Tournament, Final	Tangshan, China	Decision (Unanimous)	3	3:00
For the 2025 Wu Lin Feng World MAX 70kg Tournament Final title.
2025-01-25	Win	(Romania) Marian Lăpușneanu	Wu Lin Feng 2025 Global Kung Fu Festival - MAX Tournament, Semifinals	Tangshan, China	Decision (Split)	3	3:00
2024-12-21	Loss	(Thailand) Buakaw Banchamek	Rajadamnern World Series, Rajadamnern Stadium 80th Anniversary	Bangkok, Thailand	Decision (Unanimous)	3	3:00
2024-08-31	Win	(Thailand) Jomthong Chuwattana	Wu Lin Feng 547 - MAX Qualifying Tournament, Final	Tangshan, China	Decision (Unanimous)	3	3:00
Qualifies for Wu Lin Feng World MAX Tournament Final.
2024-08-31	Win	(Belarus) Dzianis Zuev	Wu Lin Feng 547 - MAX Qualifying Tournament, Semifinal	Tangshan, China	Decision (Unanimous)	3	3:00
2024-07-27	Win	(Thailand) Saiyok Pumpanmuang	Wu Lin Feng 546	China	Decision	3	3:00
2023-05-27	Win	(Russia) Alexander Skvortsov	Wu Lin Feng 538	Tangshan, China	Decision (Unanimous)	3	3:00
2023-03-18	Win	(Netherlands) Younes Smaili	Wu Lin Feng 535: China vs Netherlands	Tangshan, China	Decision (Unanimous)	3	3:00
2023-02-04	Win	(China) Zhou Jiaqiang	Wu Lin Feng 2023: Chinese New Year, Tournament Final	Tangshan, China	TKO (Corner stoppage)	2	
Wins the 2023 Wu Lin Feng -67 kg World Tournament.
2023-02-04	Win	(China) Shang Xifeng	Wu Lin Feng 2023: Chinese New Year, Tournament Semifinal	Tangshan, China	Decision (Unanimous)	3	3:00
2023-02-04	Win	(Spain) Mikel Sortino	Wu Lin Feng 2023: Chinese New Year, Tournament Quarterfinal	Tangshan, China	Decision (Unanimous)	3	3:00
2022-12-10	Loss	(China) Luo Chao	Wu Lin Feng 532, Tournament Semifinal	Zhengzhou, China	Decision (Unanimous)	3	3:00
2022-09-24	Win	(China) Liu Yunlong	Wu Lin Feng 531	Zhengzhou, China	Decision (Unanimous)	3	3:00
2022-04-10	Win	(Cambodia) Chhoeung Lvai	Wu Lin Feng 2022: WLF in Cambodia	Angkor, Cambodia	KO (Punches)	1	
2022-03-26	Loss	(China) Luo Chao	Wu Lin Feng 528, Tournament Semifinal	Zhengzhou, China	Decision (Unanimous)	3	3:00
2021-11-27	Loss	(China) Ouyang Feng	Wu Lin Feng 2021: World Contender League 7th Stage, Tournament Final	Zhengzhou, China	Decision (Unanimous)	3	3:00
For the Wu Lin Feng World Contender League -70kg Tournament title.
2021-10-30	Win	(China) Ren Guohao	Wu Lin Feng 2021: WLF on Haihua Island, Tournament Semifinal	Zhengzhou, China	Decision (Unanimous)	3	3:00
2021-09-25	Win	(China) Liu Lei	Wu Lin Feng 2021: WLF in Tangshan	Zhengzhou, China	Decision (Unanimous)	3	3:00
2021-07-03	Win	(China) Luo Chao	Wu Lin Feng 2021: World Contender League 5th Stage	Zhengzhou, China	Decision (Unanimous)	3	3:00
2021-04-24	Win	(China) Qu Hao	Wu Lin Feng 2021: World Contender League 2nd Stage	Zhengzhou, China	Decision (Unanimous)	3	3:00
2021-03-27	Loss	(China) Ouyang Feng	Wu Lin Feng 2021: World Contender League 1st Stage	Zhengzhou, China	Decision (Unanimous)	3	3:00
2020-11-28	Loss	(China) Liu Lei	Wu Lin Feng 2020: China 70kg Championship Tournament, Tournament Semifinal	Zhengzhou, China	Decision (Unanimous)	3	3:00
2020-11-28	Win	(China) Xu Liu	Wu Lin Feng 2020: China 70kg Championship Tournament, Tournament Quarterfinal	Zhengzhou, China	Decision (Unanimous)	3	3:00
2020-08-20	Win	(China) Han Junjie	Rise of Heroes 20, final	China	Decision	3	3:00
2020-08-20	Win	(China) Chang Yuhang	Rise of Heroes 20, semi-final	China	Decision	3	3:00
2020-08-08	Win	(China) Han Junjie	Rise of Heroes	China	Decision	3	3:00
2020-07-30	Win	(China) Ayati	Rise of Heroes	China	TKO (punches)		
2020-07-23	Win	(China) Qu Peng	Rise of Heroes	China	TKO	1	0:24
2019-12-28	Win	(Belarus) Artur Isayants	Glory of Heroes 44	China	Decision	3	3:00
2019-09-07	Win	(Japan) Katsuya Jinbo	Glory of Heroes 41	Qinhuangdao, China	Ext.R Decision	4	3:00
2019-08-05	Win	(Egypt) Ahmad Mabrouk	Glory of Heroes 40	Cairo, Egypt	Decision	3	3:00
2019-06-22	Win	(France) Anthony Gazel	Glory of Heroes 39	Xinyi, China	TKO (low kicks)	2	
2019-04-16	Win	(New Zealand) Jordan Syme	Glory of Heroes 37	Auckland, New Zealand	Decision (Unanimous)	3	3:00
2018-10-20	Win	(France) Damien Cazambo	Glory of Heroes 36: Ziyang	Sichuan, China	Decision (Unanimous)	3	3:00
2018-09-15	Win	(Belarus) Dzmitry	Glory of Heroes 34: Tongling	Anhui, China	TKO	2	
2018-05-26	Win	(Greece) Kostas Fasomitakis	Glory of Heroes 31: Beijing	Beijing, China	Decision (Unanimous)	3	3:00
2018-03-03	Win	(Australia) Thomas Maguren	Glory of Heroes: New Zealand vs China	Auckland, New Zealand	Decision (Unanimous)	3	3:00
2018-02-02	Win	(Thailand) Mingkwan	Glory of Heroes: Chengdu	Chengdu, China	Decision (Unanimous)	3	3:00
2018-01-06	Loss	(Belgium) Mohamed Hendouf	Glory of Heroes: Wudang Mountain, Tournament Semifinals	Hubei, China	Decision (Unanimous)	3	3:00
2017-09-18	Loss	(Japan) Hitoshi Tsukakoshi	K-1 World GP 2017 Welterweight Championship Tournament, Tournament Quarterfinals	Saitama, Japan	Decision (Unanimous)	3	3:00
2017-05-27	Loss	(Portugal) Luis Passos	Glory of Heroes: Portugal & Strikers League, Tournament Semifinals	Carcavelos, Portugal	Decision (Unanimous)	3	3:00
2017-04-28	Win	(Thailand) Tongdee Kittipong	Rise of Heroes / Conquest of Heroes: Chengde	Chengde, China	Decision (Unanimous)	3	3:00
2017-02-18	Win	(Australia) Harley Love	Rise of Heroes 7: China vs New Zealand	Auckland, New Zealand	Decision (Majority)	3	3:00
2017-01-13	Win	(Thailand) Teerachai	Glory of Heroes 6	Jiyuan, China	KO	2	
2016-08-27	Loss	(Australia) Hussein Al Mansouri	Wu Lin Feng 2016: China vs Australia	Sydney, Australia	Decision (Unanimous)	3	3:00
2016-12-27	Win	(Thailand) Napat	Wu Lin Feng	China	Decision	3	3:00
2016-11-27	Win	(France) Julien	Wu Lin Feng	China	Decision	3	3:00
2016-07-15	Win	(China) Jin Bao	Wu Lin Feng	China	Decision	3	3:00
2016-03-05	Win		Wu Lin Feng	China	Decision	3	3:00
2015-11-22	Win	(Thailand) Mangsing	Wu Lin Feng	China	Decision	3	3:00
2015-10-03	Loss	(China) Wang Baoduo	Wu Lin Feng	China	Decision	3	3:00
2015-07-04	Loss	(China) Zhao Chunyang	Wu Lin Feng	China	Decision	3	3:00
2015-06-02	Win	(China)	Wu Lin Feng	China	Decision	3	3:00
2015-04-04	Win	(China)	Wu Lin Feng	China	Decision	3	3:00
2014-12-31	Win	(China) Yeermaike Bahetikelide	Wu Lin Feng	China	Decision	3	3:00
2014-11-09	Win	(China) Chen Yage	Wu Lin Feng	China	Decision	3	3:00
2014-10-06	Win	(China) Chen Yage	Wu Lin Feng	Henan province, China	Decision	3	3:00
Legend: Win Loss Draw/No contest Notes

== Exhibition Kickboxing record ==
Exhibition Kickboxing Record
Date	Result	Opponent	Event	Location	Method	Round	Time
2025-12-14	Loss	(Japan) YURA	Breaking Down 18	Tokyo, Japan	Ext.R Decision (unanimous)	2	1:00
Legend: Win Loss Draw/No contest Notes

== See also ==
- List of male kickboxers
