= Luo Chao =

Chinese kickboxer

- Born: 罗超; February 13, 2001 (age 25); Nanchang, China
- Other names: The Handsome White Dragon (帅白龙)
- Height: 181 cm (5 ft 11 in)
- Weight: 70 kg (150 lb; 11 st)
- Style: Kickboxing, Sanda
- Stance: Orthodox
- Fighting out of: Shenzhen, China
- Team: Shenzhen Shengli Renhe Fight Club

Kickboxing record
- Total: 56
- Wins: 44
- By knockout: 19
- Losses: 11
- By knockout: 1
- Draws: 1

Luo Chao (Chinese: 罗超) is a Chinese kickboxer.

As of December 2024, he was the #10 ranked -71 kg kickboxer in the world according to Combat Press.

== Kickboxing career ==
On September 15, 2019, Luo faced Jiao Zhou at Kunlun Fight 84. He won the fight by unanimous decision.

On November 28, 2020, Luo took part in an 8-man one night tournament for the title Chinese New Kings in the 70 kg division at Wu Lin Feng 2020: China New Kings Tournament. In the quarterfinals he defeated Li Shiyuan by unanimous decision. In the semifinals he defeated Wu Shijie by unanimous decision to advance to the final where he lost to Liu Lei by unanimous decision.

On December 9, 2020, Luo faced Lu Jiahui at the Kunlun Professional Fight Club League Finals. He won his fight by unanimous decision to offer the national title to his team.

On January 1, 2022, Luo faced Ouyang Feng at Wu Lin Feng 527. He lost the fight by unanimous decision.

On March 26, 2022, Luo took part in a four-man tournament at Wu Lin Feng 528. In the semifinals he defeated Han Wenbao by unanimous decision. In the finals he faced Ouyang Feng for the third of his career as Ouyang was on a 16 fights winning streak. Luo won the fight by unanimous decision with all three judges scoring the bout 29–28.

On February 4, 2023, Luo defeated Vladimir Shuliak by unanimous decision at Wu Lin Feng 2023: Chinese New Year.

On May 27, 2023, Luo defeated Chen Yonghui by unanimous decision at Wu Lin Feng 538.

On May 14, 2024, Luo faced Roeung Sophorn at an event co-promoted by Wu Lin Feng and Town Kun Khmer. He won the fight by second-round knockout.

On June 29, 2024, Luo faced Dejrit SathianGym at EM Legend 46. He won the fight by extension round decision.

On July 27, 2024, Luo faced reigning RCC Fair Fight champion Aleksei Ulianov at Wu Lin Feng 546. He won the fight by unanimous decision.

On November 30, 2024, Luo took part in a four-man qualifier tournament at Wu Lin Feng 550. In the semifinals he defeated Jamal Yusupov by third-round technical knockout with low kicks. In the finals he defeated Masoud Minaei by first-round technical knockout, forcing the referee to stop the contest after a flurry of punches. The tournament win qualified him for the 2024-2025 Wu Lin Feng World MAX 63kg Tournament Final.

== Championships and accomplishments ==
=== Professional ===
- International Sport Kickboxing Association
  - 2025 ISKA K-1 Intercontinental Super-welterweight (70 kg) Champion
- Wu Lin Feng
  - 2020 Wu Lin Feng China New Kings Tournament -70 kg Runner-up
  - 2022 Wu Lin Feng "KO of the Year" Award (vs. Lao Chantrea)
  - 2022 Wu Lin Feng China -70 kg 4-man Tournament Champion
- Mars Martial Championship
  - 2019 MMC Asian Cup -77 kg Winner

=== Amateur ===
- 5x Jiangxi Province Sanda Championship Winner (2011–2015)
- Chinese Kickboxing Federation
  - 2022 China National Kickboxing Championship 75 kg Winner
  - 2024 China National Kickboxing Championship 75 kg Winner
- Chinese Muay Thai Federation
  - 2023 China National Muay Thai Championship 75 kg Winner
- World Association of Kickboxing Organizations
  - 2024 W.A.K.O Asian Kickboxing Championships K-1 -75 kg (bronze)

== Kickboxing record ==
Kickboxing record
44 Wins (18 (T)KO's), 11 Losses, 1 Draw
Date	Result	Opponent	Event	Location	Method	Round	Time
2026-08-08	Win	(Japan) Kosuke Takagi	ONE Samurai 2	Tokyo, Japan	Decision (Unanimous)	3	3:00
ONE Samurai Featherweight Kickboxing Tournament Quarterfinal.
2026-05-15	Win	(Brazil) Denis Souza Jr.	ONE Fight NIght 43	Bangkok, Thailand	Decision (Split)	3	3:00
2026-02-06	Win	(Spain) Fernando Martin Sanchez	Zhengquan Strike	Baise, China	KO (Body punches)	1	1:20
Wins the vacant ISKA K-1 Intercontinental Super-welterweight (70 kg) title.
2025-10-07	Loss	(Thailand) Yodwicha Por.Boonsit	EM Legend 50	Qionglai, China	TKO (Knee and punches)	1	1:51
For the EM-Legend 70 kg Intercontinental title.
2025-01-25	Loss	(China) Ouyang Feng	Wu Lin Feng 2025 Global Kung Fu Festival - MAX Tournament, Semifinals	Tangshan, China	Decision (Unanimous)	3	3:00
2024-11-30	Win	(Iran) Masoud Minaei	Wu Lin Feng 550 - MAX Qualifier Tournament, Final	Tangshan, China	TKO (Punches)	1	
Qualifies for Wu Lin Feng World MAX Tournament Final.
2024-11-30	Win	(Turkey) Jamal Yusupov	Wu Lin Feng 550 - MAX Qualifier Tournament, Semifinals	Tangshan, China	TKO (Low kicks)	3	
2024-07-27	Win	(Russia) Aleksei Ulianov	Wu Lin Feng 546	Tangshan, China	Decision (Unanimous)	3	3:00
2024-06-29	Win	(Thailand) Dejrit SathianGym	EM Legend 46	Chongqing, China	Ext.R Decision	4	3:00
2024-05-14	Win	(Cambodia) Roeung Sophorn	Town Kun Khmer	Phnom Penh, Cambodia	TKO (3 Knockdowns/Body shots)	2	0:57
2024-04-06	Win	(Hungary) Fábián Kristóf	Wu Lin Feng 2024: Hungary vs China	Budapest, Hungary	Decision	3	3:00
2024-03-09	Win	(China) Yue Long	China Kickboxing Premier League	China	TKO (Body shots)	1	
2023-09-15	Win	(China) Yue Long	TOP Fighting World Championship	Hefei, China	TKO (Corner stoppage)		
2023-05-27	Win	(China) Chen Yonghui	Wu Lin Feng 538	Tangshan, China	Decision (Unanimous)	3	3:00
2023-02-04	Win	(Russia) Vladimir Shuliak	Wu Lin Feng 2023: Chinese New Year	Tangshan, China	Decision (Unanimous)	3	3:00
2022-12-09	Loss	(China) Ouyang Feng	Wu Lin Feng 532, Final	Zhengzhou, China	Decision	3	3:00
2022-12-09	Win	(China) Han Wenbao	Wu Lin Feng 532, Tournament Semifinal	Zhengzhou, China	Decision (Unanimous)	3	3:00
2022-09-24	Win	(China) Qu Hao	Wu Lin Feng 531	Zhengzhou, China	Decision (Unanimous)	3	3:00
2022-07-09	Win	(China) Cao Shuaihang	Wu Lin Feng x Huya Kung Fu Carnival 6	Zhengzhou, China	KO (Body punches)	1	1:08
2022-04-10	Win	(Cambodia) Lao Chantrea	Wu Lin Feng 2022: WLF in Cambodia	Angkor, Cambodia	KO (Body punches)	1	1:08
2022-03-26	Win	(China) Ouyang Feng	Wu Lin Feng 528, Final	Zhengzhou, China	Decision (Unanimous)	3	3:00
Wins the Wu Lin Feng China -70 kg 4-man tournament title.
2022-03-26	Win	(China) Han Wenbao	Wu Lin Feng 528, Tournament Semifinal	Zhengzhou, China	Decision (Unanimous)	3	3:00
2022-01-01	Loss	(China) Ouyang Feng	Wu Lin Feng 527	Tangshan, China	Decision (Unanimous)	3	3:00
2021-12-16	Win	(China) Liu Lei	Wu Lin Feng 2021: WLF 526	Zhengzhou, China	Decision (Unanimous)	3	3:00
2021-10-30	Loss	(China) Ouyang Feng	Wu Lin Feng 2021: WLF on Haihua Island	Daizhou, China	Decision (Unanimous)	3	3:00
2021-09-30	Win	(China) Qu Hao	Wu Lin Feng 2021: World Contender League 6th Stage	Zhengzhou, China	Decision (Unanimous)	3	3:00
2021-07-03	Loss	(China) Han Wenbao	Wu Lin Feng 2021: World Contender League 5th Stage	Zhengzhou, China	Decision (Unanimous)	3	3:00
2021-04-24	Win	(China) Liu Lei	Wu Lin Feng 2021: World Contender League 2nd Stage	Zhengzhou, China	Decision (Unanimous)	3	3:00
2021-03-27	Loss	(China) Xu Liu	Kunlun Fight Club Professional League	Tongling, China	Decision (Unanimous)	3	3:00
2020-12-09	Win	(China) Lu Jiahui	Kunlun Fight Club Professional League - Final	Wenzhou, China	Decision (Unanimous)	3	3:00
2020-11-28	Loss	(China) Liu Lei	Wu Lin Feng 2020: China New Kings Tournament, Final	Zhengzhou, China	Decision (Unanimous)	3	3:00
For the Wu Lin Feng China New Kings -70 kg Tournament title.
2020-11-28	Win	(China) Wu Shijie	Wu Lin Feng 2020: China New Kings Tournament, Semi Finals	Zhengzhou, China	Decision (Unanimous)	3	3:00
2020-11-28	Win	(China) Li Shiyuan	Wu Lin Feng 2020: China New Kings Tournament, Quarter Finals	Zhengzhou, China	Decision (Unanimous)	3	3:00
2020-09-22	Win	(China) Wu Chenglin	Kunlun Fight Club Professional League	Tongling, China	KO		
2020-08-24	Win	(China) Li Lin	Kunlun Fight Club Professional League	Tongling, China	KO (Body punch)	1	
2020-06-20	Win	(China) Zhang Mengfei	ONE Hero Series 13	Shanghai, China	Decision (Split)	3	3:00
2019-12-28	Win	(Thailand) Nantakorn	MMC 050 - Asian Cup, Final	Dongfang, China	TKO (Punches)	1	
Wins the MMC Asian Cup -77 kg title.
2019-12-28	Win	(China) Li Weijin	MMC 050 - Asian Cup, Semifinals	Dongfang, China	TKO (Front kick)	2	
2019-12-24	Win	(China) Zhang Mengfei	Kunlun Fight Club Professional League - Final	Tongling, China	Decision (Unanimous)	3	3:00
2019-12-01	Win	(China)	Kunlun Fight Club Professional League	Tongling, China			
2019-11-18	Win	(China) Liu Guicheng	ONE Hero Series November	Beijing, China	TKO (3 Knockdowns)	1	
2019-11-02	Win	(China) Nuerzathi	Kunlun Fight Club Professional League	Tongling, China	KO (Left hook to the body)	3	2:22
2019-09-15	Win	(China) Jiao Zhou	Kunlun Fight 84	Zunyi, China	Decision (Unanimous)	3	3:00
2019-07-21	Win	(China) Zhao Junchen	ONE Hero Series July	Beijing, China	TKO (Punches)	2	2:52
2019-05-27	Win	(China) Zhang Wan Xin	ONE Hero Series April	Beijing, China	TKO (Punches)	1	1:42
2019-04-22	Loss	(China) Lui Ruilei	ONE Hero Series April	Beijing, China	Decision (Split)	3	3:00
2018-11-19	Win	(Thailand) Chairit Neephonkrang	Kunlun Fight Elite Fight Night 3	Tongling, China	KO (Knees)	2	2:49
2018-10-17	Draw	(China) Wu Kangle	Kunlun Fight Club Professional League	Tongling, China	Decision	3	3:00
2018-10-12	Loss	(Thailand) Patipan	Glory of Heroes 35: Meishan	Sichuan, China	Decision (Unanimous)	3	3:00
2018-11-06	Win	(China) Feng Zhiqiang	Kunlun Fight Elite Fight Night 2	Tongling, China	TKO (Corner stoppage)	3	0:38
2018-07-07	Win	(China) Guo Mengfei	Glory of Heroes 32: Huizhou	Guangdong, China			
2018-01-27	Win	(China) Lin Yiming	Glory of Heroes: Qingdao	Qingdao, China			
Legend: Win Loss Draw/No contest Notes

Amateur Kickboxing record
Date	Result	Opponent	Event	Location	Method	Round	Time
2024-10-	Loss	(Uzbekistan) Davlatbek Rayimjonov	2024 WAKO Asian Kickboxing Championship, Semifinals	Phnom Penh, Cambodia	Walkover		
Wins 2024 WAKO Asian Championship K-1 -75 kg bronze medal.
2024-10-	Win	(Kyrgyzstan) Azamat Kudaiberdiev	2024 WAKO Asian Kickboxing Championship, Quarterfinals	Phnom Penh, Cambodia	Decision (3:0)	3	2:00
2024-10-	Win	(United Arab Emirates) Mohamed Hadile	2024 WAKO Asian Kickboxing Championship, First Round	Phnom Penh, Cambodia	Decision (3:0)	3	2:00
Legend: Win Loss Draw/No contest Notes

== See also ==
- List of male kickboxers
