= Soslanbek Izrailov =

Manager for athletes

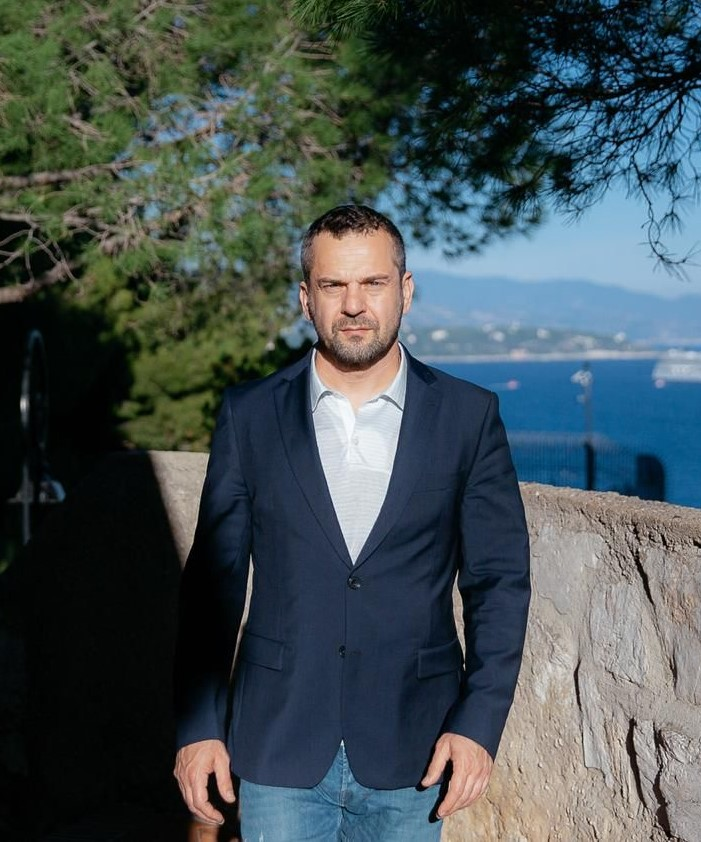
- Born: Soslanbek Izrailov; June 25, 1975 (age 50); Grozny, USSR
- Education: HES Rotterdam
- Occupations: Sports Manager, Producer

Soslanbek Izrailov (born June 25, 1975) is a martial arts sports manager, matchmaker, producer, and promoter.

== Early life and education ==
Soslanbek Izrailov was born in Grozny, in the former Soviet Union, into a distinguished family. His father served as a Supreme Court judge, while his mother worked as a construction design engineer. He completed his studies at the Moscow External University of Humanities and subsequently became a senior lecturer at the Grozny State Oil Technical University.

In 1999, he moved to the Netherlands and, in 2007, graduated from HES Rotterdam with a degree in International Business and Management Studies. His academic achievements led to an invitation to teach Risk Management at the same institution.

Soslanbek is currently based in Antwerp, Belgium, where he lives with his family and continues to work in the combat sports industry.

== Career in Combat Sports ==
Izrailov organized his first event - a university fashion show attended by over 600 students - while still in school. Shortly after, he shifted his focus to sports. During his university years, he developed an interest in sports journalism and became a recognized martial arts journalist, contributing to various magazines and websites.

In 2011, he founded ZIA Sportmanagement, a company focused on managing fighters and organizing sports events and seminars. He collaborated with leading Dutch gyms, including Carbin Fighting Factory and SuperPro, and began working with elite athletes.

Izrailov has managed professional fighters and promoted numerous events in kickboxing, MMA, and Brazilian Jiu-Jitsu (BJJ). He has also organized seminars and masterclasses with legendary coaches and fighters such as Dennis Krauweel, Lucien Carbin, Fedor Emelianenko, and Remy Bonjasky.

In 2013, he began working with Tatneft Cup, the largest Eastern European kickboxing organization at the time. Initially serving as an external consultant, he later became the matchmaker, and eventually the producer and sports director. Under his leadership, Tatneft Cup gained broader international exposure, appearing on major television platforms such as Eurosport, Match TV, and FightBox.

In 2016, Izrailov began developing ACB KB, a regional kickboxing promotion. Over two years, he organized 14 high-level events around the world - from the United States to Europe and China - with broadcasts on major television networks. ACB (nowadays - ACA) Kickboxing division became one of the most recognized kickboxing organizations globally during that period. In addition, Izrailov served as a producer on multiple television documentaries.

In 2018, he launched ORION, a multifaceted project that included a kickboxing promotion, sports gear production, fighter management, and the first Russian National Kickboxing Awards. In 2020, due to the global pandemic, Izrailov made the decision to close the project.

Since then, he has worked as an independent consultant in the martial arts industry, collaborating with various kickboxing, MMA, and BJJ teams and promotions.

His ongoing work includes managing fighters such as Alexander Stetsurenko and Giorgi Malania, as well as serving on the Committee for International Relations and Connections of the Kickboxing Federation of Russia, and partnering with the FighteRagency Sports Management team.
