= Wei Weiyang =

Chinese kickboxer

- Born: December 16, 1998 (age 27); Zhoukou, China
- Height: 176 cm (5 ft 9 in)
- Weight: 63 kg (139 lb; 9.9 st)
- Style: Kickboxing
- Stance: Orthodox
- Fighting out of: Wenzhou, China
- Team: Yuncheng Fighting Club
- Trainer: Wei Rui
- Years active: 2017-Present

Kickboxing record
- Total: 49
- Wins: 34
- By knockout: 13
- Losses: 15
- By knockout: 1

Wei Weiyang (Chinese: 位威阳) is a Chinese kickboxer, currently competing in the -63 kg division of Wu Lin Feng.

As of April 2025 he was the #9 ranked -64 kg kickboxer in the world by Beyond Kickboxing.

== Kickboxing career ==
On December 2, 2017, Wei took a professional fight on short notice to face Alex Dass Rey at EM Legend 26. He won the fight by extension round unanimous decision.

Weiyang faced Ali Zarinfar on October 3, 2019, at Kunlun Fight 86. He lost the fight by decision.

Weiyang faced the Wu Lin Feng World -60 kg champion Hirotaka Asahisa in a non-title bout at Wu Lin Feng 2024: 12th Global Kung Fu Festival on January 27, 2024. He lost the fight by unanimous decision.

Weiyang faced Superman Banchamek at Wu Lin Feng 547 on August 31, 2024. He won the fight by a third-round knockout, after flooring his opponent with an uppercut.

Wei faced Hirotaka Asahisa at Wu Lin Feng 2024: 12th Global Kung Fu Festival on January 27, 2024. He lost the fight by unanimous decision.

On October 26, 2024, at Wu Lin Feng 549 Wei took part in a 4-man qualifier tournament for the upcoming Wu Lin Feng 63 kg World MAX tournament. In the semifinals he defeated Kongnapa Weerasakreck by unanimous decision, with three scorecards of 29—28 in his favor. In the final he lost to Giorgi Malania, who earned his place in the finals with a decision win over Zhang Lanpei, by unanimous decision.

Weiyang faced Salah Hitou at Wu Lin Feng 550 on November 30, 2024. He won the fight by a second round knockout.

Weiyang was expected to face Amin Guliyev at Wu Lin Feng 553 on March 29, 2025. His opponent was unable to obtain a visa in time and was replaced by Lani Alexandros. Weiyang won the fight by a third-round technical knockout.

== Championships and accomplishments ==
- Wu Lin Feng
  - 2023 Wu Lin Feng Asia -63 kg Tournament Runner-up

== Kickboxing record ==
Kickboxing record
35 Wins (13 (T)KOs), 15 Losses, 0 Draws
Date	Result	Opponent	Event	Location	Method	Round	Time
2026-10-05	Loss	(Thailand) Supajit	Zhijin International Combat Sports : China vs Thailand	Zhijin, China	Decision	3	3:00
2026-06-06	Win	(Belarus) Danila Kvach	Wu Lin Feng Kung Fu Carnival Jingzhou	Jingzhou, China	Decision	3	3:00
2026-02-01	Win	(Russia) Vasili Petchersikh	Wu Lin Feng 2026 Global Kung Fu Festival	Zhengzhou, China	TKO (Punches)	1	
2025-03-29	Win	(Greece) Lani Alexandros	Wu Lin Feng 553	Tangshan, China	TKO (retirement)	3	
2025-01-11	Loss	(Russia) Roman Zhuravlev	World Heroes Showdown 1	Sanya, China	Ext.R Decision (Unanimous)	4	3:00
2024-11-30	Win	(Belgium) Salah Hitou	Wu Lin Feng 550	Tangshan, China	KO (Left hook)	2	2:32
2024-10-26	Loss	(Georgia (country)) Giorgi Malania	Wu Lin Feng 549 - 63 kg Qualifier Tournament, Final	Tangshan, China	Decision (Unanimous)	3	3:00
Fails to qualify for the 2025 Wu Lin Feng World MAX 63kg Tournament Final.
2024-10-26	Win	(Thailand) Kongnapa Weerasakreck	Wu Lin Feng 549 - 63 kg Qualifier Tournament, Final	Tangshan, China	Decision (Unanimous)	3	3:00
2024-08-31	Win	(Thailand) Superman Banchamek	Wu Lin Feng 547	Tangshan, China	KO (Uppercut)	3	
2024-07-27	Win	(Cambodia) Long Benloeun	WLM Wulin League	Hangzhou, China	KO (Low kick)	1	1:11
2024-04-06	Loss	(China) Zhang Jingtao	China Kickboxing League	Wuzhishan, China	Decision	3	3:00
2024-01-27	Loss	(Japan) Hirotaka Asahisa	Wu Lin Feng 2024: 12th Global Kung Fu Festival	Tangshan, China	Decision (Unanimous)	3	3:00
2023-11-25	Win	(Russia) Ivan Rodkin	Wu Lin Feng 1000th Broadcast Celebration	Tangshan, China	TKO (Punches)	3	
2023-05-02	Loss	(China) Jin Ying	Wu Lin Feng 537 - Asia Tournament, Final	Tangshan, China	Decision (Unanimous)	3	3:00
For the 2023 Wu Lin Feng Asia -63kg Tournament title.
2023-05-02	Win	(China) Zhang Jingtao	Wu Lin Feng 537 - Asia Tournament, Semifinals	Tangshan, China	KO (Low kick)	1	
2023-05-02	Win	(South Korea) Kim Woo Seung	Wu Lin Feng 537 - Asia Tournament, Quarterfinals	Tangshan, China	Decision (Unanimous)	3	3:00
2023-02-03	Win	(Thailand) Buadin Banchamek	Wu Lin Feng 533: China vs. Thailand	Tangshan, China	Decision (Unanimous)	3	3:00
2022-12-09	Loss	(China) Zhu Shuai	Wu Lin Feng 532, Semi Final	Zhengzhou, China	Decision	3	3:00
2022-09-24	Win	(China) Shun Li	Wu Lin Feng 531	Zhengzhou, China	TKO	1	
2022-04-10	Win	(Cambodia) Lao Chetra	Wu Lin Feng 2022: WLF in Cambodia	Angkor, Cambodia	Decision	3	3:00
2022-01-01	Loss	(China) Jin Ying	Wu Lin Feng 2022, Contender League Final	Tangshan, China	Decision (Unanimous)	3	3:00
2021-12-16	Loss	(China) Zhang Lanpei	Wu Lin Feng 526	Zhengzhou, China	Decision (Split)	3	3:00
2021-05-22	Win	(China) Yimireti Tuoheti	Wu Lin Feng 2021: World Contender League 3rd Stage	Xin County, China	Ext.R Decision (Unanimous)	4	3:00
2021-03-27	Loss	(China) Zhu Shuai	Wu Lin Feng 2021: World Contender League 1st Stage	China	Decision (Unanimous)	3	3:00
2020-12-19	Win	(China) Shengtang Tianci	Kunlun Fight Club Professional League	Tongling, China	Decision (Unanimous)	3	3:00
2020-10-16	Loss	(China) Yang Ming	Wu Lin Feng 2020: China New Kings Champions Challenge match	Hangzhou, China	Decision	3	3:00
2020-09-22	Win	(China) Zhu Songling	Kunlun Fight Club Professional League	Tongling, China	Decision (Unanimous)	3	3:00
2020-06-13	Loss	(China) Wang Zhiwei	Wu Lin Feng 2020: King's Super Cup 2nd Group Stage	Hangzhou, China	Ext.R KO (body hook)	4	1:50
2019-11-17	Win	(China) Huang Jie	Kunlun Fight Club Professional League	Chengdu, China	Decision (Unanimous)	3	3:00
2019-10-03	Loss	(Iran) Ali Zarinfar	Kunlun Fight 86	Tongliao, China	Decision	3	3:00
2019-09-18	Win	(China) Yang Li	Kunlun Fight Club Professional League	Chengdu, China	Decision (Unanimous)	3	3:00
2019-05-31	Win	(China) Han Baozhou	Kunlun Fight Club Professional League	China	TKO (Punches)	2	
2019-03-23	Win	(Iran) Said Masawi	Kunlun Fight Club Professional League	Zunyi, China	KO (Punches)	1	
2018-12-27	Win	(China) Jiasi Wuqi	Kunlun Fight Club Professional League	Tongling, China	Decision (Unanimous)	3	3:00
2018-12-01	Win	(Russia) Ildot Ismonov	WLF -67kg World Cup 2018-2019 6th Round	Zhengzhou, China	Decision (Unanimous)	3	3:00
2018-04-07	Win	(United States) Cody Allenpoli	Longyaodongfang	Weifang, China	Decision (Unanimous)	3	3:00
2018-03-20	Loss	(China) Han Bingquan	Emei Legend	China	Decision (Unanimous)	3	3:00
2017-12-02	Win	(Spain) Alex Dass Rey	EM Legend 26	Emeishan City, China	Ext.R Decision (Unanimous)	4	3:00
Legend: Win Loss Draw/No contest Notes

== Exhibition Kickboxing record ==
Exhibition Kickboxing Record
Date	Result	Opponent	Event	Location	Method	Round	Time
2025-12-14	Loss	(Japan) Ryotaro Ihara	Breaking Down 18	Tokyo, Japan	Ext.R Decision (unanimous)	2	1:00
Legend: Win Loss Draw/No contest Notes

== See also ==
- List of male kickboxers
