= 2025 in Wu Lin Feng =

Chinese kickboxing events

Information
- First date: January

Events
- Total events: TBD

Fights
- Total fights: TBD
- Title fights: TBD

The year 2025 is the 22nd year in the history of the Wu Lin Feng, a Chinese kickboxing promotion. The events are broadcast on Henan Television in mainland China and streamed on Douyin and Xigua Video.

== List of events ==
No.	Event	Date	Venue	City
1	Wu Lin Feng 2025 Global Kung Fu Festival	January 25, 2025	Tangshan Sports Center	Tangshan, China
2	Wu Lin Feng 553	March 29, 2025	Tangshan Sports Center	Tangshan, China
3	Wu Lin Feng 554	September 27, 2025	Tianjin Grand Theatre	Tianjin, China

== Wu Lin Feng 2025 Global Kung Fu Festival ==
Wu Lin Feng
- Promotion: Wu Lin Feng
- Date: January 25, 2025
- City: China

Wu Lin Feng 2025 Global Kung Fu Festival or Wu Lin Feng 552 will be a kickboxing event held on January 25, 2025, in China.

=== Background ===
This event will feature the 70kg and 63kg MAX 4-man Tournament finals.

=== 2024-2025 WLF World MAX Tournament bracket ===
First Round (2024-8-31 / 9-28 / 10-26 / 11-30)
(China) Han Wenbao	UD
(Belarus) Dzianis Zuev	3
(Thailand) Jomthong Chuwattana	KO
(China) Meng Lingkuo	1
(Russia) Vasilii Semenov	UD
(China) Huang Yuan Zhe	3
(Romania) Marian Lăpușneanu	UD
(China) Chen Yonghui	3
(China) Ouyang Feng	UD
(Germany) Johannes Baas	3
(China) Ji Longteng	3
(Russia) Aleksei Ulianov	UD
(Iran) Masoud Minaei	UD
(Germany) Pascal Schroth	3
(China) Luo Chao	TKO
(Russia) Jamal Yusupov	3

Quarter Finals (2024-8-31 / 9-28 / 10-26 / 11-30)
(China) Han Wenbao	UD
(Thailand) Jomthong Chuwattana	3
(Romania) Marian Lăpușneanu	KO
(Russia) Vasilii Semenov	3
(China) Ouyang Feng	UD
(Russia) Aleksei Ulianov	3
(Iran) Masoud Minaei	1
(China) Luo Chao	TKO

Semi Finals (2025-1-25)
(China) Han Wenbao	SD
(Romania) Marian Lăpușneanu	3
(China) Ouyang Feng	UD
(China) Luo Chao	3

Final (2025-1-25)
(China) Han Wenbao	3
(China) Ouyang Feng	UD

=== 2024-2025 WLF World −63 kg Tournament bracket ===
First Round (2024-9-28 / 10-26 / 11-30/ 12-28)
(China) Jin Ying	UD
(United Kingdom) Mo Abdurahman	3
(China) Zhao Chongyang	KO
(Spain) Daniel Puertas	2
(China) Zhang Lanpei	3
(Georgia (country)) Giorgi Malania	UD
(China) Wei Weiyang	UD
(Thailand) Kongnapa Weerasakreck	3
(Japan) Hirotaka Asahisa	UD
(China) Zhang Jingtao	3
(China) Zhu Shuai	UD
(Thailand) Pinpetch Banchamek	3
(China) Shun Li	UD
(Iran) Ali Zarinfar	3
(China) Ji Zhize	UD
(Thailand) Petchdam Petchyindee Academy	3

Quarter Finals (2024-9-28 / 10-26 / 11-30/ 12-28)
(China) Jin Ying	3
(China) Zhao Chongyang	UD
(Georgia (country)) Giorgi Malania	UD
(China) Wei Weiyang	3
(Japan) Hirotaka Asahisa	UD
(China) Zhu Shuai	3
(China) Shun Li	UD
(China) Ji Zhize	3

Semi Finals (2025-1-25)
(China) Zhao Chongyang	3
(Georgia (country)) Giorgi Malania	UD
(Japan) Hirotaka Asahisa	UD
(China) Ji Zhize^{1}	3

Final (2025-1-25)
(Japan) Hirotaka Asahisa	1
(Georgia (country)) Giorgi Malania	TKO

^{1}Shun Li couldn't participate to the tournament Final due to injury and was replaced by Ji Zhize.

=== Results ===
Wu Lin Feng 2025 Global Kung Fu Festival
Weight Class				Method	Round	Time	Notes
Kickboxing -70 kg	(China) Ouyang Feng	def.	(China) Han Wenbao	Decision (Unanimous)	3	3:00	70kg MAX Tournament Final
Kickboxing 63 kg	(Georgia (country)) Giorgi Malania	def.	(Japan) Hirotaka Asahisa	TKO (3 Knockdowns)	1	2:54	63kg MAX Tournament Final
Kickboxing 72 kg	(Turkey) Tayfun Ozcan	def.	(China) Chen Yonghui	Decision	3	3:00	
MMA 67 kg	(China) Li Kaiwen	vs.	(Japan) Mitsuhiro Toma				
Kickboxing 67.5 kg	(China) Zhou Jiaqiang	def.	(Japan) Yosuke Aoki	KO	1		
Kickboxing -70 kg	(China) Ouyang Feng	def.	(China) Luo Chao	Decision	3	3:00	70kg MAX Tournament Semifinals
Kickboxing -70 kg	(China) Han Wenbao	def.	(Romania) Marian Lăpușneanu	Decision (Split)	3	3:00	70kg MAX Tournament Semifinals
Kickboxing 63 kg	(Japan) Hirotaka Asahisa	def.	(China) Ji Zhize	Decision (Unanimous)	3	3:00	63kg MAX Tournament Semifinals
Kickboxing 63 kg	(Georgia (country)) Giorgi Malania	def.	(China) Zhao Chongyang	Decision (Unanimous)	3	3:00	63kg MAX Tournament Semifinals

== Wu Lin Feng 553 ==
Wu Lin Feng 553
- Promotion: Wu Lin Feng
- Date: March 29, 2025
- Venue: Tangshan Sports Center
- City: Tangshan, China

Wu Lin Feng 553 will be a kickboxing event held on March 29, 2025, in Tangshan, China.

=== Background ===
The theme of the event is "Team Ouyang Feng vs Team Yoshihiro Sato" and features matchups between Wu Lin Feng fighters and K-1 Japan Group fighters. The main event was initially a 71kg fight between Luo Chao and Kacper Muszyński. Muszyński withdrew due to a back injury.

=== Results ===
Wu Lin Feng 553
Weight Class				Method	Round	Time	Notes
Kickboxing 64kg	(China) Wei Weiyang	def.	(Greece) Alexandros Lani	TKO (retirement)	3		
MMA 66kg	(Brazil) Matheus Correia	def.	(China) Li Yunfeng	Decision	3	5:00	
Kickboxing 68kg	(China) Zhou Jiaqiang	def.	(Georgia (country)) Gabunia Nakhtang	Decision (Unanimous)	3	3:00	
Kickboxing 77kg	(Russia) Magomed Magomedov	def.	(China) Li Hui	Decision (Unanimous)	3	3:00	
Kickboxing 71kg	(New Zealand) Jonathan Aiulu	def.	(China) Lichan Gbang	Decision (Unanimous)	3	3:00	
Kickboxing 67kg	(China) Meng Gaofeng	def.	(Thailand) Yodkhunpon Weerasakreck	Decision (Unanimous)	3	3:00	Yodkhunpon received a point deduction for missing weight and a point for excessive clinching
Kickboxing 63kg	(China) Jin Ying	def.	(Japan) Hannya Hashimoto	Decision (Unanimous)	3	3:00	
Kickboxing 61kg	(China) Huang Qirui	def.	(Japan) Shota Meguro	Decision (Unanimous)	3	3:00	

== Wu Lin Feng 554 ==
Wu Lin Feng
- Promotion: Wu Lin Feng
- Date: September 27, 2025
- Venue: Tangshan Sports Center
- City: Tianjin, China

Wu Lin Feng 554 will be a kickboxing event held on September 27, 2025, in Tianjin, China.

=== Results ===
Wu Lin Feng 554
Weight Class				Method	Round	Time	Notes
Kickboxing 70kg	(Iran) Masoud Minaei	def.	(China) Li Changbang	Decision	3	3:00	
Kickboxing 63.5kg	(China) Wang Penghui	def.	(Thailand) Pinphet Banchamek	Decision	3	3:00	
Kickboxing -63kg	(Georgia (country)) Giorgi Malania (c)	def.	(China) Jin Ying	TKO (4 Knockdowns)	3	2:20	For the vacant Wu Lin Feng World -63kg title
Kickboxing 75kg	(Russia) Andrey Elin	def.	(China) Han Wenbao	Decision	3	3:00	
Kickboxing 77kg	(China) Xu Yuanqing	def.	(Spain) Lazaro Borja	Decision (unanimous)	3	3:00	
Kickboxing 58kg	(China) Zhang Yong	def.	(Japan) Takahito Niimi	Decision	3	3:00	
Kickboxing 67kg	(China) Yi Yuxuan	def.	(Uzbekistan) Dostonbek	Decision (unanimous)	3	3:00	
Kickboxing 61kg	(China) Huang Qirui	def.	(Greece) Angelos Giakoumis	Decision (unanimous)	3	3:00	

== See also ==
- 2025 in Glory
- 2025 in K-1
- 2025 in RISE
- 2025 in ONE Championship
- 2025 in Romanian kickboxing
