= 2026 in Wu Lin Feng =

Chinese kickboxing year

Information
- First date: 7 February 2026

Events
- Total events: TBD

Fights
- Total fights: TBD
- Title fights: TBD

The year 2026 is the 23rd year in the history of the Wu Lin Feng, a Chinese kickboxing promotion. The events are broadcast on Henan Television in mainland China and streamed on Douyin and Xigua Video.

== List of events ==
No.	Event	Date	Venue	City
1	Wu Lin Feng 2026 Global Kung Fu Festival	February 7, 2026		Zhengzhou, China
2	Wu Lin Feng 556	May 16, 2026		Pingdingshan, China

== Wu Lin Feng 2026 Global Kung Fu Festival ==
Wu Lin Feng
- Promotion: Wu Lin Feng
- Date: February 7, 2026
- City: Zhengzhou, China

Wu Lin Feng 2026 Global Kung Fu Festival or Wu Lin Feng 555 was a kickboxing event held on February 7, 2026, in Zhengzhou, China.

=== Background ===
The event will feature a two 4-man tournament for vacant titles. The 77kg tournament will feature Li Hui, Magomed Magomedov and Xu Yuanqing. The 67kg tournament will feature Yi Yuxuan and Er Kang against international competition. Ouyang Feng will face Andrey Elin in 75kg catchweight bout. Giorgi Malania defends his 63kg MAX title against Zhu Shuai.

=== Results ===
Wu Lin Feng 2026 Global Kung Fu Festival
Weight Class				Method	Round	Time	Notes
Kickboxing -63 kg	(Georgia (country)) Giorgi Malania (c)	def.	(China) Zhu Shuai	TKO (Doctor stoppage)	3	1:07	For the Wu Lin Feng World -63kg title
Kickboxing -77 kg	(China) Xu Yuanqing	def.	(Russia) Magomed Magomedov	Decision (unanimous)	3:00	3	For the inaugural Wu Lin Feng World -77kg title
Kickboxing -67 kg	(China) Er Kang	def.	(China) Yi Yuxuan	Decision (unanimous)	3	3:00	For the vacant Wu Lin Feng World -67kg title
Catchweight -75 kg	(China) Ouyang Feng (c)	def.	(Russia) Andrey Elin	Decision (unanimous)	3	3:00	Elin missed the contracted weight (70kg) by 5 kg.
Kickboxing -64 kg	(China) Wei Weiyang	def.	(Russia) Vasili Petchersikh	TKO (Punches)	1		
Kickboxing -77 kg	(Russia) Magomed Magomedov	def.	(China) Li Hui	Decision	3	3:00	WLF 77kg Championship Tournament, Semifinals
Kickboxing -77 kg	(China) Xu Yuanqing	def.	(Thailand) Kompikart Sor Tawanrung	Decision (unanimous)	3	3:00	WLF 77kg Championship Tournament, Semifinals
Kickboxing -67 kg	(China) Yi Yuxuan	def.	(Russia) Robert	Decision	3	3:00	WLF 67kg Championship Tournament, Semifinals
Kickboxing -67 kg	(China) Er Kang	def.	(Azerbaijan) Elnur				WLF 67kg Championship Tournament, Semifinals

== Wu Lin Feng 556 ==
Wu Lin Feng 556 was held on May 16, 2026, in Pingdingshan, China.

=== Background ===
The event featured title defenses at 70 and 77kg from Ouyang Feng and Xu Yuanqing. Jin Ying faced Ji Zhize in a 63kg matchup.

=== Results ===
Wu Lin Feng 556
Weight Class				Method	Round	Time	Notes
Kickboxing -70 kg	(China) Ouyang Feng (c)	def.	(Ukraine) Taras Hnatchuk	Decision (unanimous)	5	3:00	For the Wu Lin Feng World -70kg title
Kickboxing -77 kg	(Russia) Dmitry Menshikov	def.	(China) Xu Yuanqing (c)	Decision (unanimous)	5	3:00	For the Wu Lin Feng World -77kg title
Kickboxing -77 kg	(Russia) Denis Burmatov	def.	(China) Li Hui	Decision	3	3:00	
Kickboxing -70 kg	(China) Yan Xuhao	def.	(Iran) Reza Ghafari	Decision (unanimous)	3	3:00	
Kickboxing -67 kg	(China) Er Kang (c)	def.	(Russia) Mamedov Magsad	TKO (body shot)	5	1:44	For the Wu Lin Feng World -67kg title
Kickboxing -63 kg	(China) Ji Zhize	def.	(China) Jin Ying	Decision (unanimous)	3	3:00	
Kickboxing -63 kg	(China) Huang Qirui	def.	(Belarus) Danil Yermolenka	Decision (unanimous)	3	3:00	

== Wu Lin Feng Kung Fu Carnival Jingzhou ==
Wu Lin Feng Kung Fu Carnival Jingzhou
- Promotion: Wu Lin Feng
- Date: June 6, 2026
- City: Jingzhou, China

Wu Lin Feng Kung Fu Carnival Jingzhou or Wu Lin Feng 557 was a kickboxing event held on June 6, 2026, in Pingdingshan, China.

=== Background ===
The event will be headlined by Meng Gaofeng. Wei Weiyang faced Danila Kvach. Zhang Jingtao and Cai Weihao are also competing.

=== Results ===
Wu Lin Feng Kung Fu Carnival Jingzhou
Weight Class				Method	Round	Time	Notes
Kickboxing -70 kg	(China) Meng Gaofeng	def.	(Uzbekistan) Abos Bozorboyev	TKO (referee stoppage)	3	1:02	
Kickboxing -67 kg	(China) Jin Ying	def.	(Iran) Mohammad	Decision (unanimous)	3	3:00	
Kickboxing -65 kg	(China) Shun Li	def.	(Morocco) Lahcen El-Hasri	TKO (knee)	1	2:22	
Kickboxing -65 kg	(China) Wei Weiyang	def.	(Belarus) Danila Kvach	Decision (unanimous)	3	3:00	
Kickboxing -80 kg	(China) Cai Weihao	def.	(Thailand) Settapong	KO (punch)	3	0:33	
Kickboxing -70 kg	(China) Zhou Jiaqiang	def.	(Morocco) Mohamed Ait-Ouazzou	TKO (punches)	2	2:03	
Kickboxing -90 kg	(China) Jia Xiangming	def.	(China) Zhang Dun	TKO	1	1:45	
Kickboxing -70 kg	(China) Zheng Donghuai	def.	(China) Hou Junlong	Decision (unanimous)	3	3:00	
Kickboxing -60 kg	(China) Zhang Zhenghao	def.	(China) Ma Yushuo	Decision (unanimous)	3	3:00	

== See also ==
- 2026 in Glory
- 2026 in K-1
- 2026 in RISE
- 2026 in ONE Championship
- 2026 in Romanian kickboxing
