= Adrian Maxim =

Romanian kickboxer

- Born: September 7, 1988 (age 38); Oradea, Romania
- Nationality: Romania
- Height: 1.68 m (5 ft 6 in)
- Weight: 63 kg (139 lb; 9.9 st)
- Style: Kickboxing
- Stance: Orthodox
- Fighting out of: Oradea, Romania
- Team: Gym Mar Strong; Respect Gym Oradea
- Trainer: Horia Radulescu; Sorin Vesa
- Years active: 2010 - present

Kickboxing record
- Total: 79
- Wins: 54
- By knockout: 21
- Losses: 24
- By knockout: 3
- No contests: 1

Adrian Maxim (born September 7, 1988) is a Romanian kickboxer. He is the current DFS Lightweight Champion and the 2017 Wu Lin Feng -63 kg World Tournament Winner.

== Biography and career ==
Adrian Maxim was born on September 7, 1988, in Oradea, Romania. He started combat sports with wrestling which he trained in for three years. At the age of 14 he started kickboxing with his trainer Oleg Mereuţă.

Maxim faced Petru Morari for the WKU European Light Welterweight title at GFC 6 on November 29, 2019. He won the fight by unanimous decision. Maxim next faced Wang Pengfei at Wu Lin Feng 2020: WLF World Cup 2019-2020 Final on January 11, 2020. He won the fight by decision.

Maxim faced Said Malek at OSS Fighters 05 on February 7, 2020. He lost the fight by split decision. Maxim faced Marian Lăpușneanu at Colosseum Tournament 19 on September 25, 2020. He lost the fight by unanimous decision, after an extra fourth round was fought.

On December 15, 2021, Maxim engaged in a 4-man tournament for the inaugural Dynamite Fighting Show featherweight title. In the semi-final he defeated Serghei Zhanosiev by second-round TKO. In the final he rematched Ionut Popa and the two went to draw once again, after an extra round the judges gave Maxim winner by majority decision.

Maxim faced Amir Bislimi El-Dakkak at Colosseum Tournament 30 on April 8, 2022. He won the fight by unanimous decision.

Maxim faced Ghenadie Gîtlan at Colosseum Tournament 32 on June 3, 2022. He won the fight by unanimous decision.

Maxim faced Vladimir Filipov at Prometheus 3 on September 1, 2022. He needed just 61 seconds to stop Filipov with a left hook to the body.

Maxim faced Francesco Picca at FEA Championship: Full - Drive on December 17, 2022, in the semifinals of the FEA featherweight tournament. He was able to beat Picca by a first-round knockout, but suffered a unanimous decision loss to Dmitrii Sirbu in the finals of the one-day tournament.

== Championships and awards ==
- Wu Lin Feng
  - 2017 Wu Lin Feng -63 kg World Tournament Winner
- World Kickboxing and Karate Union
  - 2019 WKU European -65 kg Champion
- Dynamite Fighting Show
  - 2021 DFS Lightweight Champion
- International Fight Sport Association
  - 2023 IFSA World -65 kg Champion
- Colosseum Tournament
  - 2026 Colosseum Tournament Featherweight Champion

== Fight record ==
Professional Kickboxing record
54 Wins (21 (T)KO's), 24 Losses, 0 Draws, 1 No Contest
Date	Result	Opponent	Event	Location	Method	Round	Time
2026-10-28	Win	(Italy) Eugenio Paladiev	Colosseum Tournament 51	Bucharest, Romania	TKO (doctor stoppage)	1	3:00
2026-06-26	Win	(Romania) Andrei Sîrghi	Colosseum Tournament 50: Romania vs Africa	Suceava, Romania	Decision (unanimous)	5	3:00
Wins the vacant Colosseum Tournament World Featherweight (-65kg) title.
2025-12-12	Win	(Romania) Ionel Bălan	Dynamite Fighting Show 29	Timișoara, Romania	Decision (unanimous)	3	3:00
2025-05-30	Win	(Brazil) Daniel de Oliveira	Road to DFS 6	Cluj-Napoca, Romania	Decision (unanimous)	3	3:00
2024-12-06	Loss	(Portugal) Vinicius Bereta	Dynamite Fighting Show 25	Oradea, Romania	Decision (Split)	3	3:00
2024-06-13	NC	(Ukraine) Serhii Adamchuk	K-1 Fighting Network Romania 2024	Galați, Romania	Doctor stoppage (head clah)	1	2:47
2024-03-29	Loss	(Romania) Andrei Varga	Dynamite Fighting Show 22, Lightweight Grand Prix Quarterfinal	Baia Mare, Romania	Decision (Unanimous)	3	3:00
2023-06-24	Loss	(China) Zhu Shuai	Wu Lin Feng 539	Tangshan, China	TKO (Low kicks)	3	1:12
2023-04-29	Win	(Germany) Johann Dederer	Muskel Kater Fight Night XIV	Mainz, Germany	TKO (low kick)	3	0:42
Wins the vacant IFSA K-1 World -65kg title.
2023-04-08	Loss	(Moldova) Dmitrii Sîrbu	FEA Take Off	Chișinău, Moldova	Decision (Unanimous)	5	3:00
For the FEA Featherweight title.
2023-02-04	Loss	(China) Wei Rui	Wu Lin Feng 2023: Chinese New Year	Tangshan, China	Decision (Unanimous)	3	3:00
2022-12-17	Loss	(Moldova) Dmitrii Sîrbu	FEA Championship: Full - Drive, Tournament Final	Chișinău, Moldova	Ext. R. Decision	4	3:00
For the FEA interim Featherweight title.
2022-12-17	Win	(Italy) Francesco Picca	FEA Championship: Full - Drive, Tournament Semi-final	Ciorescu, Moldova	TKO (Punches)	1	0:53
2022-09-01	Win	(Moldova) Vladimir Filipov	Prometheus 3	Dej, Romania	KO (left hook to the body)	1	1:01
2022-06-03	Win	(Moldova) Ghenadie Gîtlan	Colosseum Tournament 32	Craiova, Romania	Decision (unanimous)	3	3:00
2022-04-08	Win	(Sweden) Amir Bislimi El-Dakkak	Colosseum Tournament 30	Malmö, Sweden	Decision (unanimous)	3	3:00
2021-12-15	Win	(Romania) Ionuț Popa	Dynamite Fighting Show 13, Final	Bucharest, Romania	Ext.R Decision (majority)	4	3:00
Wins the inaugural Dynamite Fighting Show lightweight title.
2021-12-15	Win	(Romania) Serghei Zanosiev	Dynamite Fighting Show 13, Semi-final	Bucharest, Romania	TKO (knee)	2	1:49
2021-09-20	Win	(Romania) Lucian Gherman	Colosseum Tournament 27	Oradea, Romania	TKO (retirement)	2	3:00
2021-07-22	Win	(Romania) Ionuț Popa	Prometheus 1	Cluj-Napoca, Romania	Ext.R Decision	4	3:00
2021-04-01	Loss	(Romania) Cristian Spetcu	Colosseum Tournament 24	Bucharest, Romania	Decision	3	3:00
2020-12-18	Win	(Romania) Silviu Ionescu	Colosseum Tournament 22	Bucharest, Romania	Decision (Unanimous)	3	3:00
2020-09-25	Loss	(Romania) Marian Lăpușneanu	Colosseum Tournament 19	Hungary	Ext.R Decision (Unanimous)	4	3:00
2020-02-07	Loss	(Morocco) Said Malek	OSS Fighters 05	Bucharest, Romania	Decision (Split)	3	3:00
2020-01-11	Win	(China) Wang Pengfei	Wu Lin Feng 2020: WLF World Cup 2019-2020 Final	Zhuhai, China	Decision	3	3:00
2019-11-29	Win	(Moldova) Petru Morari	GFC 6	Timișoara, Romania	Decision (Unanimous)	5	3:00
Wins the WKU European Light Welterweight title.
2019-10-28	Loss	(Moldova) Maxim Railean	Colosseum Tournament 16, -65 kg Tournament Final	Sibiu, Romania	TKO (retirement)	3	3:00
For the inaugural Colosseum Tournament -65kg World title. Maxim left the ring at the announce of the extra round.
2019-10-28	Win	(Italy) Fabrizio Conti	Colosseum Tournament 16, -65 kg Tournament Semi-final	Sibiu, Romania	Decision (Unanimous)	3	3:00
2019-09-22	Win	(Armenia) Artom Grigoryan	Colosseum Tournament 15	Oradea, Romania	Decision (Unanimous)	3	3:00
2019-07-27	Loss	(China) Pan Jiayun	Wu Lin Feng 2019: WLF -67kg World Cup 2019-2020 2nd Group Stage	Zhengzhou, China	Decision (Unanimous)	3	3:00
2019-06-03	Win	(Iran) Mohammad Firouzabadi	KO Masters 3	Bucharest, Romania	KO (Left Hook)	2	2:05
2019-03-31	Win	(Italy) Sergio Vinto	Supreme Night Fight	Dej, Romania	Decision (Unanimous)	3	3:00
2018-10-28	Win	(Moldova) Dmitrii Sirbu	Colosseum Tournament IX	Romania	Decision (Unanimous)	3	3:00
2018-08-24	Win	(China) Jin Ying	Wu Lin Feng 2018: WLF x OSS Fighters - China vs Romania	Mamaia, Romania	Decision (Unanimous)	3	3:00
2018-06-02	Loss	(China) Zhang Chenglong	Glory 54: Birmingham	Birmingham, England	Decision (Unanimous)	3	3:00
2018-04-28	Win	(Bulgaria) Ali Uzeir	GFC 4	Varna, Bulgaria	Decision	3	3:00
2018-04-07	Win	(China) Wang Pengfei	Wu Lin Feng 2018: World Championship Shijiazhuang	Shijiazhuang, China	Ext.R Decision	4	3:00
2018-01-27	Win	(Italy) Samuele De Mais	Fighters League 2	Reșița, Romania	Decision	3	3:00
2017-11-04	Win	(China) Jin Ying	Wu Lin Feng 2017: Yi Long VS Sitthichai	Kunming, China	Ext.R Decision	4	3:00
2017-08-25	Loss	(France) Victor Pinto	Glory 44: Chicago Featherweight Contender Tournament, Semi-final	Chicago, United States	Decision (Split)	3	3:00
2017-06-16	Win	(China) Liu Qilliang	Wu Lin Feng 2017: Romania VS China	Timișoara, Romania	Decision (Unanimous)	3	3:00
2017-04-01	Win	(China) Liu Yong	Wu Lin Feng 2017: China VS Europe	Zhengzhou, China	Decision (Unanimous)	3	3:00
2017-03-10	Loss	(United Kingdom) Bailey Sugden	Road to Glory UK: 65 kg Tournament, Semi-final	Grantham, England	Decision (Majority)	3	3:00
2017-03-10	Win	(Italy) Matteo de Rosa	Road to Glory UK: 65 kg Tournament, Quarter-final	Grantham, England	Decision (Unanimous)	3	3:00
2017-02-04	Loss	(Scotland) Chris Shaw	DUEL GRAND PRIX, Semi-final	England	Decision (Unanimous)	3	3:00
2017-01-14	Win	(China) Zhao Fuxiang	Wu Lin Feng World Championship 2017 63 kg Tournament Final	Zhengzhou, China	TKO	1	
Wins the Wu Lin Feng World -63kg Tournament title.
2017-01-14	Win	(China) Jin Ying	Wu Lin Feng World Championship 2017 63 kg Tournament Semi-finals	Zhengzhou, China	Decision (Unanimous)	3	3:00
2017-01-14	Win	(China) Wang Zhiwei	Wu Lin Feng World Championship 2017 63 kg Tournament Quarter-finals	Zhengzhou, China	Decision (Unanimous)	3	3:00
2016-12-17	Loss	(China) Qiu Jianliang	Glory of Heroes - Rise 5	Nanning, China	Decision (Unanimous)	3	3:00
2016-11-19	Loss	(Germany) Kevin Burmester	Get in the Ring 2016	Hamburg, Germany	Decision	3	3:00
2016-09-09	Win	(Romania) Cezar Andrieş	Respect World Series Pitesti	Pitești, Romania	Decision	3	3:00
2016-06-04	Win	(China) Liang Shoutao	Wu Lin Feng: Japan vs China	Zhengzhou, China	Decision (Unanimous)	3	3:00
2016-04-05	Win	(Spain) Avelino Molina	WFT Sevilla	Sevilla, Spain	TKO (Low Kicks)	2	
2015-10-30	Loss	(Egypt) Emad Kadyear	WFT Madrid	Madrid, Spain	Decision	3	3:00
2015-10-02	Win	(San Marino) Roberto Gheorghita	WFT Madrid	Milan, Italy	Decision (Uannimous)	3	3:00
2015-08-01	Win	(Romania) Alexandru Șerban	SUPERKOMBAT World Grand Prix IV 2015	Mamaia, Romania	Decision	3	3:00
2015-04-25	Loss	(Romania) Cristian Spetcu	Confruntarea Titanilor	Bucharest, Romania	Ext.R Decision	4	3:00
2014-12-06	Win	(Germany) Marius Groß	Muskel Kater Fight Nights	Saulheim, Germany	KO (High kick)	2	
2014-09-06	Loss	(Spain) David Mejia	Fight Dreams	Albacete Spain	Decision	3	3:00
2014-03-29	Win	(Serbia) Aleksandar Topic	SuperKombat New Heroes	Ploieşti, Romania	Decision (Unanimous)	3	3:00
2013-11-15	Loss	(Romania) Sebastian Dragan	UFT - Ultimate Fighting Tournament	Cluj-Napoca, Romania	TKO (leg injury)	1	
2013-10-05	Win	(Romania) Ciprian Botezat	Noaptea Catanelor Negre	Nasaud, Romania	TKO (Corner stoppage)	2	
2013-05-05	Loss	(Greece) Athanasios Karousos	Scorpion 4	Greece	Decision	3	3:00
2013-04-06	Win	(Romania) Marius Ciucala	Superkombat	Oradea, Romania	Decision (Unanimous)	3	3:00
2011-11-04	Loss	(France) Anis Kaabouri	Romanian Fighting Series 2	Slobozia, Romania	Decision	3	3:00
2011-09-03	Win	(Romania) Nicolae Hristea	Rieni Challenge Fight	Rieni, Romania	TKO (retirement)	2	3:00
2010-12-23	Loss	(Romania) Alexandru Niţă	Bloody Mary Fight Night	Râmnicu Vâlcea, Romania	Decision	3	3:00
Legend: Win Loss Draw/No contest Notes
