= Zhu Shuai =

Chinese kickboxer

- Born: August 10, 1995 (age 31); Zhoukou, China
- Height: 171 cm (5 ft 7 in)
- Weight: 63 kg (139 lb; 9.9 st)
- Style: Kickboxing, Sanda
- Stance: Orthodox
- Fighting out of: Liaoning, China
- Team: Liaoning Innovation Fighting Club

Kickboxing record
- Total: 65
- Wins: 47
- By knockout: 10
- Losses: 18

Zhu Shuai (Chinese: 朱帅) is a Chinese kickboxer.

As of October 2024 he was ranked as the #2 featherweight in the world by Beyond Kick.

== Career ==
Zhu then entered the Wu Lin Feng 2018 60 kg tournament on March 10, 2018. He was defeated by Djany Fiorenti in the quarterfinals.

On April 27, 2019, Zhu entered the Wu Lin Feng -63kg Championship World Tournament. In the quarterfinals he lost to Denis Wosik by decision.

Zhu Shuai faced Koya Urabe at Krush 103 on July 21, 2019. He won the fight by first round knockout with a right cross after 55 seconds.

Zhu faced Hirotaka Asahisa in a non-title bout at Wu Lin Feng 2020: WLF World Cup 2019-2020 Final on January 11, 2020. He won the fight by unanimous decision after scoring a knockdown.

On November 30, 2024, Zhu took part in a four-man qualifier tournament at Wu Lin Feng 550. In the semifinals he defeated Pinpetch Banchamek by unanimous decision. In the finals he lost to Hirotaka Asahisa by unanimous decision after suffering a knockdown on a high kick in the second round .

== Titles and accomplishments ==
Amateur

- 2013 Liaoning Province -60 kg Sanda Champion
- 2015 China -60 kg Kickboxing Champion
- 2015 Jingwu Cup -65 kg Champion

Professional

- Hero Legends
  - 2015 Hero Legends China vs Japan 8-man Tournament Champion
  - 2015 Hero Legends Asia -60 kg Champion
- Wu Lin Feng
  - 2016 Wu Lin Feng Rookie of the Year
  - 2020 Wu Lin Feng China -63 kg Champion

== Kickboxing record ==
Professional Kickboxing Record
46 Wins (11 (T)KO's), 19 Losses, 0 Draw, 0 No Contest
Date	Result	Opponent	Event	Location	Method	Round	Time
2026-11-21	Loss	(Uzbekistan) Samandar Khasanov	Red Fist Strike	Baise, China	Decision	3	3:00
2026-02-01	Loss	(Georgia (country)) Giorgi Malania	Wu Lin Feng 2026 Global Kung Fu Festival	Zhengzhou, China	TKO (Doctor stoppage)	3	1:07
For the Wu Lin Feng World -63kg title.
2025-10-31	Loss	(France) Arthur Klopp	ONE Friday Fights 131, Lumpinee Stadium	Bangkok, Thailand	Décision (Split)	3	3:00
2024-11-30	Loss	(Japan) Hirotaka Asahisa	Wu Lin Feng 550 - 63 kg Qualifier Tournament, Final	Tangshan, China	Decision (Unanimous)	3	3:00
Fails to qualify for the 2025 Wu Lin Feng World MAX 63kg Tournament Final.
2024-11-30	Win	(Thailand) Pinpetch Banchamek	Wu Lin Feng 550 - 63 kg Qualifier Tournament, Semifinals	Tangshan, China	Decision	3	3:00
2024-03-30	Win	(Thailand) Yodkhunpon Moothong Academy	Wu Lin Feng 20th Year Anniversary	Tangshan, China	Decision (Unanimous)	3	3:00
2023-11-25	Win	(Netherlands) Matthew Daalman	Wu Lin Feng 1000th Broadcast Celebration	Tangshan, China	Decision (Unanimous)	3	3:00
2023-06-24	Win	(Romania) Adrian Maxim	Wu Lin Feng 539	Tangshan, China	TKO (Low kicks)	3	1:12
2023-02-04	Loss	(Belarus) Maksim Petkevich	Wu Lin Feng 2023: Chinese New Year	Tangshan, China	Decision (Unanimous)	3	3:00
2022-12-09	Win	(China) Jin Ying	Wu Lin Feng 532, Final	Zhengzhou, China	Decision (Unanimous)	3	3:00
2022-12-09	Win	(China) Wei Weiyang	Wu Lin Feng 532, Semi Final	Zhengzhou, China	Decision	3	3:00
2022-09-24	Win	(China) San Shun	Wu Lin Feng 531	Zhengzhou, China	Decision (Unanimous)	3	3:00
2022-03-26	Win	(Russia) Sergey Lutchenko	Wu Lin Feng 528	Zhengzhou, China	KO (Left hook)	1	2:21
2021-11-27	Loss	(China) Jin Ying	Wu Lin Feng 2021 Contender League, Semifinals	Zhengzhou, China	Ext.R Decision (Split)	4	3:00
2021-09-30	Win	(China) Yimireti Tuoheti	Wu Lin Feng 2021: World Contender League 6th Stage	Zhengzhou, China	Decision (Unanimous)	3	3:00
2021-05-22	Win	(China) Zhang Jun	Wu Lin Feng 2021: World Contender League 3rd Stage	Xin County, China	Decision (Unanimous)	3	3:00
2021-03-27	Win	(China) Wei Weiyang	Wu Lin Feng 2021: World Contender League 1st Stage	China	Decision (Unanimous)	3	3:00
2021-01-23	Loss	(China) Jin Ying	Wu Lin Feng 2021: Global Kung Fu Festival	Macao, China	Decision (Unanimous)	3	3:00
2020-11-14	Win	(China) Wang Zhiwei	Wu Lin Feng 2020: China 63kg Championship Tournament Final	Zhengzhou, China	Decision (Unanimous)	3	3:00
Wins Wu Lin Feng China -63kg title.
2020-11-14	Win	(China) Ma Yunkang	Wu Lin Feng 2020: China 63kg Championship Tournament Final	Zhengzhou, China	KO (High Kick)	2	
2020-11-14	Win	(China) Fang Feida	Wu Lin Feng 2020: China 63kg Championship Tournament Quarter Final	Zhengzhou, China	KO (2 Knockdowns/Left Hook)	2	2:40
2020-09-23	Win	(China) Ma Yunkang	Wu Lin Feng 2020: King's Super Cup 5th Group Stage	Zhengzhou, China	Decision (Unanimous)	2	
2020-08-03	Win	(China) Fang Feida	Wu Lin Feng 2020: King's Super Cup 4th Group Stage	Zhengzhou, China	Decision	3	3:00
2020-05-15	Loss	(China) Jin Ying	Wu Lin Feng 2020: King's Super Cup 1st Group Stage	Zhengzhou, China	Decision (Unanimous)	3	3:00
2020-01-11	Win	(Japan) Hirotaka Asahisa	Wu Lin Feng 2020: WLF World Cup 2019-2020 Final	Zhuhai, China	Decision (Unanimous)	3	3:00
2019-10-26	Win	(Thailand) Seurhoy Banchamek	Wu Lin Feng 2019: WLF -67kg World Cup 2019-2020 5th Group Stage	Zhengzhou, China	Decision (Unanimous)	3	3:00
2019-07-21	Win	(Japan) Koya Urabe	Wu Lin Feng 2019: WLF x Krush 103 - China vs Japan	Tokyo, Japan	KO (Straight Right)	1	0:55
2019-04-27	Loss	(Germany) Denis Wosik	Wu Lin Feng 2019: WLF -63kg Championship World Tournament, Quarter Finals	Zhuhai, China	Decision	3	3:00
2019-02-23	Win	(Spain) Cedric Da Silva	Wu Lin Feng 2019: WLF Championship in Zhengzhou	Zhengzhou, China	KO (3 Knockdowns)	1	
2018-12-01	Loss	(China) Wang Junyu	WLF -67kg World Cup 2018-2019 6th Round, -60 kg Contender Tournament Final	Zhengzhou, China	Decision (Majority)	3	3:00
2018-12-01	Win	(Brazil) Fabrício Andrade	WLF -67kg World Cup 2018-2019 6th Round, -60 kg Contender Tournament Semi Final	Zhengzhou, China	KO (Left Hook)	2	1:50
2018-10-13	Loss	(Canada) Ferdaws Nayimi	Wu Lin Feng 2018: China vs Canada	Canada	Decision	3	3:00
2018-08-04	Win	(Belarus) Eduard Mikhovich	Wu Lin Feng 2018: WLF -67kg World Cup 2018-2019 2nd Round	Zhengzhou, China	Decision	3	3:00
2018-06-16	Loss	(Netherlands) Pietro Doorje	Wu Lin Feng 2018: China vs Netherlands & Russia	Shenyang, China	Decision (Unanimous)	3	3:00
2018-05-06	Win	(Australia) Josh Tonna	Wu Lin Feng 2018: World Championship Nanyang	Nanyang, Henan, China	Decision (Unanimous)	3	3:00
2018-04-07	Win	(Iran) Hussein	Longyaodongfang	Weifang, China	Decision (Unanimous)	3	3:00
2018-03-10	Loss	(France) Djany Fiorenti	Wu Lin Feng 2018: -60kg World Championship Tournament, Quarter Finals	Jiaozuo, China	Decision	3	3:00
2017-12-15	Win	(Russia) Sergey	Wu Lin Feng New Generation	Zhengzhou, China	Decision	3	3:00
2017-10-07	Win	(South Africa) Ncedo Gomba	Wu Lin Feng 2017: WLF VS ACB & ACB KB 11	Zhengzhou, China	Decision	3	3:00
2017-08-05	Win	(Thailand) Somchai Kittisak	Wu Lin Feng 2017: China VS Thailand	Zhengzhou, China	Decision	3	3:00
2017-04-01	Loss	(Belarus) Eduard Mikhovich	Wu Lin Feng 2017: China VS Europe 60 kg World Tournament Group C final	Zhengzhou, China	Decision (Unanimous)	3	3:00
2017-04-01	Loss	(Russia) Umar Paskhaev	Wu Lin Feng 2017: China VS Europe 60 kg World Tournament Group C Semifinal 2	Zhengzhou, China	Decision (Unanimous)	3	3:00
Zhu Shuai advances despite loss due to Paskhaev missing weight.
2017-02-24	Loss	(China) Yuan Ya	Wu Lin Feng New Generation	China	Decision	3	3:00
2016-12-17	Win	(China) Lao Tai	Dream Hero	China	Decision	3	3:00
2016-12-03	Win	(Belarus) Eduard Mikhovich	Wu Lin Feng 2016: WLF x Krush - China vs Japan	Zhengzhou, China	Decision (Unanimous)	3	3:00
2016-11-11	Win	(Uzbekistan) Keba	龙崛	China	Decision	3	3:00
2016-10-21	Win	(China) Zhao Boshi	Wu Lin Feng New Generation	China	Decision	3	3:00
2016-10-21	Win	(China) Song Mengxiao	Wu Lin Feng New Generation	China	Decision	3	3:00
2016-07-14	Loss	(China) Huo Xiaolong	Wu Lin Feng New Generation	China	Decision	3	3:00
2016-07-14	Win	(China) Xu Luzhe	Wu Lin Feng New Generation	China	KO		
2016-06-25	Win	(China) Li Xiangfeng	Gods of War	China	Decision	3	3:00
2016-05-24	Win	(China) Yuan Ya	Wu Lin Feng New Generation	China	Decision	3	3:00
2016-05-24	Win	(China)	Wu Lin Feng New Generation	China	KO		
2016-04-16	Win	(China) Tian Yuan		China	Decision	3	3:00
2016-01-23	Loss	(China) Kong Long	Wu Lin Feng New Generation	China	Decision	3	3:00
2015-11-07	Win	(China) Li Zengyang	Wu Lin Feng New Generation	China	Decision	3	3:00
2015-10-03	Win	(China) Liu Qiliang		Zhengzhou, China	Decision	3	3:00
2015-08-28	Win	(Thailand) Kompayak Sithjombung	Hero Legends	Dunhuang, China	Decision (Unanimous)	3	3:00
Wins the Hero Legnds Asia Golden Belt -60kg title.
2015-07-25	Win	(China) Li Haojie	Hero Legnds, China vs Japan 8-man Tournament, Final	Chongqing, China	Decision	3	3:00
Wins the Hero Legnds China vs Japan 8-man Tournament title.
2015-06-25	Win	(Japan) Mase Okamoto	Hero Legnds, China vs Japan 8-man Tournament, Semi Final	Chongqing, China	KO (Knee to the body)	1	
2015-06-25	Win	(Japan) Keisuke Nakamura	Hero Legnds, China vs Japan 8-man Tournament, Quarter Final	Chongqing, China	KO (Spinning back kick to the body)	3	
2015-06-05	Loss	(China) Liu Wei	Hero Legends, China vs Thailand 8-man Tournament, Final	Futian District, China	Decision (Unanimous)	3	3:00
2015-05-15	Win	(Thailand) Pettadi	Hero Legends, China vs Thailand 8-man Tournament, Semi Final	China	Decision	3	3:00
2015-05-15	Win	(Thailand)	Hero Legends, China vs Thailand 8-man Tournament, Quarter Final	China	Decision	3	3:00
2015-01-01	Win	(China) Song Cheng	China vs USA	Changsha, China	Decision	3	3:00
Legend: Win Loss Draw/No contest Notes
