= Jin Ying =

Chinese Sanshou kickboxer

- Born: August 14, 1997 (age 29); Yongjia County, China
- Other names: Jin Jintuo 金锦托
- Height: 173 cm (5 ft 8 in)
- Weight: 63 kg (139 lb; 9.9 st)
- Division: Bantamweight
- Style: Sanda, Kickboxing
- Stance: Orthodox
- Fighting out of: Zhengzhou, China
- Team: Zhengzhou Shunyuan Fighting Club
- Trainer: Yang Zhuo
- Years active: 2014 - present

Kickboxing record
- Total: 87
- Wins: 57
- By knockout: 9
- Losses: 29
- By knockout: 3
- Draws: 1

Jin Ying (Chinese: 金鹰) is a Chinese Sanda kickboxer, who has throughout his career fought almost exclusively with Wu Lin Feng. He was the 2020 WLF King's Cup Runner-up.

As of 1 August 2020, he is ranked the #7 bantamweight in the world by Combat Press. As of January 2022, Beyond Kickboxing has him ranked as the fifth best kickboxer in the world in the 64 kg division.

== Kickboxing career ==
Ying began 2019 with a decision win over Promdonyang Wirat, and followed it up with a unanimous decision win against Nicolas Gaffie, before losing a decision in turn to Markko Moisar. He then entered the 2019 WLF 63 kg tournament. He defeated Anas Mouktader by decision in the quarterfinals, but lost to the eventual winner Denis Wosik by decision in the semifinals.

In 2020, Ying fought four times. In the WLF King's Cup First Stage, Ying won a unanimous decision against Zhu Shuai. In the second stage he defeated Zhao Chongyang by a first round TKO, and in the third stage he won a decision against Fang Feida. This set up the final bout for the 2020 King's Cup against the two time WLF champion Wei Rui. Rui won their fight by unanimous decision.

== Titles and achievements ==
Amateur

- 2010 World Martial Arts Exchange Conference Sanda -58 kg Champion
- 2011 World Martial Arts Exchange Conference Sanda -58 kg Champion
- 2013 China National Boxing Junior Championship 63.5 kg Champion

Professional

- Wu Lin Feng
  - 2015 Wu Lin Feng -60 kg Newcomer of the Year
  - 2020 Wu Lin Feng King's Super Cup Runner-Up
  - 2023 Wu Lin Feng -63 kg Asia Tournament Winner

== Fight record ==
Kickboxing record
58 Wins (9 (T)KO's), 29 Losses, 1 Draw
Date	Result	Opponent	Event	Location	Method	Round	Time
2026-06-06	Win	(Iran) Mohammad	Wu Lin Feng Kung Fu Carnival Jingzhou	Jingzhou, China	Decision (Unanimous)	3	3:00
2026-05-16	Loss	(China) Ji Zhize	Wu Lin Feng 556	Pingdingshan, China	Decision (Unanimous)	3	3:00
2026-02-06	Win	(Uzbekistan) Shakhriyor Juraev	Red Fist Strike	Baise, China	KO (Low kick)	1	0:50
2026-01-09	Win	(Mongolia) Bat-Erdene Namjilmaa	WLF-YFU 91	Zhengzhou, China	Decision (Unanimous)	3	3:00
2025-09-27	Loss	(Georgia (country)) Giorgi Malania	Wu Lin Feng 554	Tianjin, China	TKO (4 Knockdowns)	3	2:20
For the Wu Lin Feng World -63kg title.
2025-05-16	Win	(Thailand) Pinphet Banchamek	YFU 84	Zhengzhou, China	Decision (Unanimous)	3	3:00
2025-02-29	Win	(Japan) Hannya Hashimoto	Wu Lin Feng 553	Tangshan, China	Decision (Unanimous)	3	3:00
2024-09-28	Loss	(China) Zhao Chongyang	Wu Lin Feng 548 - 63 kg World Tournament A Group, Final	Tangshan, China	Decision (Unanimous)	3	3:00
2024-09-28	Win	(United Kingdom) Mo Abdurahman	Wu Lin Feng 548 - 63 kg World Tournament A Group, Semifinal	Tangshan, China	Decision (Unanimous)	3	3:00
2024-03-09	Loss	(China) Zhang Jingtao	China Kickboxing League	China	TKO (Punches)	3	
2023-12-30	Win	(Iran) Nik Karchenlianl	Wu Lin Feng 2023 Year-End Kung Fu Festival	Zhengzhou, China	Decision (Unanimous)	3	3:00
2023-11-25	Win	(Japan) Hirotaka Asahisa	Wu Lin Feng 1000th Broadcast Celebration	Tangshan, China	Decision (Unanimous)	3	3:00
2023-05-02	Win	(China) Wei Weiyang	Wu Lin Feng 537, Asia Tournament Final	Tangshan, China	Decision (Unanimous)	3	3:00
Wins the 2023 Wu Lin Feng Asia -63kg Tournament title.
2023-05-02	Win	(Japan) Yuki Masui	Wu Lin Feng 537, Asia Tournament Semi Final	Tangshan, China	Decision (Unanimous)	3	3:00
2023-05-02	Win	(Russia) Abdulmalik Mugidinov	Wu Lin Feng 537, Asia Tournament Quarter Final	Tangshan, China	TKO (Straight to the body)	1	
2022-12-09	Loss	(China) Zhu Shuai	Wu Lin Feng 532, Tournament Final	Zhengzhou, China	Decision (Unanimous)	3	3:00
2022-12-09	Win	(China) Zhang Jun	Wu Lin Feng 532, Tournament Semi Final	Zhengzhou, China	Decision	3	3:00
2022-09-24	Win	(China) Ma Yunkang	Wu Lin Feng 531	Zhengzhou, China	Decision (Unanimous)	3	3:00
2022-03-26	Win	(China) San Shun	Wu Lin Feng 528, Final	Zhengzhou, China	Decision (Unanimous)	3	3:00
2022-03-26	Win	(China) Liu Wei	Wu Lin Feng 528, Semi Final	Zhengzhou, China	Decision (Unanimous)	3	3:00
2022-01-01	Win	(China) Wei Weiyang	Wu Lin Feng 2022, Contender League Final	Tangshan, China	Decision (Unanimous)	3	3:00
2021-11-27	Win	(China) Zhu Shuai	Wu Lin Feng 2021: World Contender League 7th Stage Contender League Semi Final	Zhengzhou, China	Ext.R Decision (Split)	4	3:00
2021-09-30	Loss	(China) Zheng Junfeng	Wu Lin Feng 2021: World Contender League 6th Stage	Zhengzhou, China	Decision (Unanimous)	3	3:00
2021-05-22	Win	(China) Yuan Pengbin	Wu Lin Feng 2021: World Contender League 3rd Stage	Xin County, China	Decision (Unanimous)	3	3:00
2021-03-27	Win	(China) Shun Li	Wu Lin Feng 2021: World Contender League 1st Stage	China	Decision (Unanimous)	3	3:00
2021-01-23	Win	(China) Zhu Shuai	Wu Lin Feng 2021: Global Kung Fu Festival	Macao, China	Decision (Unanimous)	3	3:00
2020-11-14	Loss	(China) Shun Li	Wu Lin Feng 2020: China 63kg Championship Tournament, Quarter Final	Zhengzhou, China	Decision (Unanimous)	3	3:00
2020-10-18	Loss	(China) Wei Rui	Wu Lin Feng 2020: King's Super Cup Final	Zhengzhou, China	Decision (Unanimous)	3	3:00
For the Wu Lin Feng King's Super Cup title.
2020-07-05	Win	(China) Fang Feida	Wu Lin Feng 2020: King's Super Cup 3rd Group Stage	Zhengzhou, China	Decision	3	3:00
2020-06-13	Win	(China) Zhao Chongyang	Wu Lin Feng 2020: King's Super Cup 2nd Group Stage	Zhengzhou, China	TKO (Left Hook)	1	1:48
2020-05-15	Win	(China) Zhu Shuai	Wu Lin Feng 2020: King's Super Cup 1st Group Stage	Zhengzhou, China	Decision (Unanimous)	3	3:00
2019-10-23	Win	(Philippines) Marc Alcoba	Wu Lin Feng 2019: WLF in Manila	Manila, Philippines	Decision	3	3:00
2019-08-31	Loss	(Brazil) Fabrício Andrade	Wu Lin Feng 2019: WLF -67kg World Cup 2019-2020 3rd Group Stage	Zhengzhou, China	TKO (Doctor Stoppage)	3	
2019-04-27	Loss	(Germany) Denis Wosik	Wu Lin Feng 2019: WLF -63kg Championship World Tournament, Semi Finals	Zhuhai, China	Decision	3	3:00
2019-04-27	Win	(Spain) Anas Mouktader	Wu Lin Feng 2019: WLF -63kg Championship World Tournament, Quarter Finals	Zhuhai, China	Decision	3	3:00
2019-04-13	Loss	(Estonia) Markko Moisar	Wu Lin Feng 2019: WLF China vs Estonia	Tallinn, Estonia	Decision	3	3:00
2019-02-23	Win	(Spain) Nicolas Gaffie	Wu Lin Feng 2019: WLF Championship in Zhengzhou	Zhengzhou, China	Decision (Unanimous)	3	3:00
2019-01-19	Win	(Thailand) Promdonyang Wirat	Wu Lin Feng 2019: WLF World Cup 2018-2019 Final	Haikou, China	Decision (Unanimous)	3	3:00
2018-12-01	Win	(Russia) Kazbek Alisultanov	Wu Lin Feng 2018: WLF -67kg World Cup 2018-2019 6th Round	Zhengzhou, China	Decision	3	3:00
2018-10-13	Win	(Canada) Amro Al Falastini	Wu Lin Feng 2018: China vs Canada	Markham, Ontario Canada	Decision	3	3:00
2018-08-24	Loss	(Romania) Adrian Maxim	Wu Lin Feng 2018: WLF x OSS Fighters - China vs Romania	Mamaia, Romania	Decision (Unanimous)	3	3:00
2018-07-22	Loss	(Japan) Hayato Suzuki	Krush.90	Tokyo, Japan	Decision (Unanimous)	3	3:00
2018-05-19	Win	(Papua New Guinea) Jonathan Tuhu	Wu Lin Feng 2018: World Championship Yichun	Yichun, China	Decision (Unanimous)	3	3:00
2018-04-07	Win	(United States) Artur Sorsor	Wu Lin Feng 2018: World Championship Shijiazhuang	Shijiazhuang, China	Decision	3	3:00
2018-03-03	Loss	(Germany) Denis Wosik	Wu Lin Feng 2018: World Championship Tianjin	Tianjin, China	Decision	3	3:00
2018-02-03	Loss	(Belgium) Nafi Bilalovski	Wu Lin Feng 2018: World Championship in Shenzhen	Shenzhen, China	Decision	3	3:00
2017-12-03	Win	(France) Najib Djelloudi	Wu Lin Feng 2017	Zhengzhou, China	Decision (Unanimous)	3	3:00
2017-11-18	Loss	(United States) TJ Arcangel	Wu Lin Feng 2017: USA vs China	Las Vegas, United States	Decision (Unanimous)	3	3:00
2017-11-04	Loss	(Romania) Adrian Maxim	Wu Lin Feng 2017: Yi Long VS Sitthichai	Kunming, China	Ext.R Decision	4	3:00
2017-10-07	Win	(Russia) Rodion Sheremet	Wu Lin Feng 2017: WLF VS ACB & ACB KB 11	Zhengzhou, China	Decision (Unanimous)	3	3:00
2017-08-05	Loss	(Thailand) Thanonchai Thanakorngym	Wu Lin Feng 2017: China VS Thailand	Zhengzhou, China	Decision	3	3:00
2017-07-01	Win	(Spain) Carlos Campos	Wu Lin Feng 2017: China VS Spain	Zhengzhou, China	TKO (Leg injury)	2	
2017-06-16	Win	(Romania) Jóni Máté	Wu Lin Feng 2017: Romania VS China	Timișoara, Romania	TKO (Corner Stoppage)	3	2:32
2017-06-03	Loss	(Japan) Daizo Sasaki	Wu Lin Feng 2017: China VS Japan	Changsha, China	Decision (Split)	3	3:00
2017-05-06	Win	(Thailand) Samransak	Wu Lin Feng 2017: China VS USA	Zhengzhou, China	Decision (Unanimous)	3	3:00
2017-04-01	Win	(Spain) Sergio Cabezas	Wu Lin Feng 2017: China VS Europe	Zhengzhou, China	Decision (Unanimous)	3	3:00
2017-03-04	Win	(Thailand) Kittachai	Wu Lin Feng 2017: Kung Fu VS Muay Thai	Zhengzhou, China	TKO	2	
2017-02-10	Win	(Cambodia) Thol Makara	Wu Lin Feng 2017: Battle of the Golden Triangle	Bokeo Province, Laos			
2017-01-14	Loss	(Romania) Adrian Maxim	Wu Lin Feng World Championship 2017 63 kg Tournament Semi Finals	Zhengzhou, China	Decision (Unanimous)	3	3:00
2017-01-14	Win	(Colombia) Joan Manuel Lique Cañaveral	Wu Lin Feng World Championship 2017 63 kg Tournament Quarter Finals	Zhengzhou, China	Decision (Unanimous)	3	3:00
2016-12-03	Win	(Japan) Keisuke Nakamura	Wu Lin Feng 2016: WLF x Krush - China vs Japan	Zhengzhou, China	Decision (Unanimous)	3	3:00
2016-11-17	Loss	(United States) Joseph Gogo	Wu Lin Feng 2016: China vs USA	Las Vegas, United States	Decision (Unanimous)	3	3:00
2016-11-05	Win	(Thailand) Petmorakot Adison	Wu Lin Feng 2016: Fight of the Century 2	Nanjing, China	Decision (Unanimous)	3	3:00
2016-10-14		(Thailand) Payanoi	Wu Lin Feng x KF1, -62 kg Intercontinental belt Final	Hong Kong			
2016-10-14	Win	(Netherlands) Reda Narain	Wu Lin Feng x KF1, -62 kg Intercontinental belt Semi Final	Hong Kong			
2016-10-01	Win	(Thailand) Jakkaphan Sompak	Glory of Heroes 5	Zhengzhou, China	TKO	3	
2016-09-03	Win	(Netherlands) Ilias El Hajoui	Wu Lin Feng 2016: Netherlands VS China	Shenzhen, China	Decision	3	3:00
2016-08-27	Loss	(Australia) Joey Concha	Wu Lin Feng 2016: China vs Australia	Sydney, Australia	Decision (Split)	3	3:00
2016-07-15	Win	(Russia) Vitaliy Volosovski	Wu Lin Feng : Russia vs China	Zhengzhou, China	Decision (Unanimous)	3	3:00
2016-06-25	Win	(Japan) Shunichi Shimizu	Hua Wujue	China	KO		
2016-06-04	Win	(France) Alexy Wallace	Wu Lin Feng	Zhengzhou, China	Decision	3	3:00
2016-05-14	Win	(New Zealand) Kane Conlan	Wu Lin Feng : China vs New Zealand	Auckland, New Zealand	Decision	3	3:00
2016-04-20	Win	(Korea) Yowan Kim	Wu Lin Feng : China vs Korea	China	Decision (Unanimous)	3	3:00
2016-04-09	Win	(Greece) Alexandros Vlachos	GODS OF WAR 8 x Wu Lin Feng : China vs Greece	Athens, Greece	Decision (Unanimous)	3	3:00
2016-03-05	Loss	(Thailand) Pakorn P.K. Saenchai Muaythaigym	Wu Lin Feng	Zhengzhou, China	Decision	3	3.00
2015-11-13	Win	(United States) Adam Rothweiler	Wu Lin Feng 2015 - USA vs China	Las Vegas, United States	Decision (Unanimous)	3	3:00
2015-10-10	Loss	(Portugal) Pedro Kol	Wu Lin Feng x Dynamite Fight Night 29	Portugal	Decision	3	3:00
For the Wu Lin Feng International -63kg title.
2015-08-22	Win	(Russia) Stanislav Maliev	Wu Lin Feng	Xiamen, China	KO		
2015-08-01	Loss	(Ukraine) Bohdan Kopkin	Wu Lin Feng	Zhengzhou, China	Decision	3	3:00
2015-07-04	Loss	(Suriname) Sergio Wielzen	Wu Lin Feng	China	KO	2	
2015-06-06	Win	(Japan) Taison Maeguchi	Wu Lin Feng 2015 Battle of the Century	Jiyuan, China	Decision	3	3:00
2015-04-12	Draw	(Japan) Masa Sato	WLF x FG - China vs Japan	Tokyo, Japan	Decision	3	3:00
2015-03-07	Win	(Portugal) Rui Briceno	Wu Lin Feng	Zhengzhou, China	Decision (Unanimous)	3	3:00
2015-01-24	Win	(Thailand) Kayasit		Huizhou, China	Decision	3	3:00
2015-01-03	Win	(Italy) Andrea Roberti	Kunlun Fight 15	Nanjing, China	Decision	3	3:00
2014-12-04	Loss	(Korea) Kim Jin-Hyeok	Kunlun Fight 14	Bangkok, Thailand	Decision	3	3:00
2014-10-19	Loss	(Thailand) Subman	Heroes Global Kung Fu	Zhengzhou, China	Decision (Unanimous)	3	3:00
2014-08-31	Win	(China) Li Xiaomao	Kunlun Fight 9	Shangqiu, China	Decision (Unanimous)	3	3:00
Legend: Win Loss Draw/No contest Notes

== See also ==
- List of male kickboxers
