= Hirotaka Asahisa =

Japanese kickboxer

- Born: 朝久裕貴; June 21, 1996 (age 30); Yoshii, Fukuoka, Japan
- Height: 172 cm (5 ft 8 in)
- Weight: 60 kg (130 lb; 9.4 st)
- Division: Bantamweight
- Style: Karate Asahisa Ryuyouga
- Stance: Orthodox
- Fighting out of: Fukuoka, Japan
- Team: Asahisa Dojo
- Trainer: Atsushi Asahisa
- Rank: Black belt in Asahisa karate
- Years active: 2012 - present

Kickboxing record
- Total: 44
- Wins: 33
- By knockout: 11
- Losses: 11
- By knockout: 2

Other information
- Notable relatives: Taio Asahisa (brother)

Hirotaka Asahisa (朝久 裕貴, born 21 June 1996) is a Japanese kickboxer, currently competing in the super featherweight division of K-1 and Wu Lin Feng. He is the current WLF Super featherweight champion. A professional competitor since 2012, Asahisa is the 2018 Wu Lin Feng Super Featherweight tournament winner and the 2022 K-1 Super Featherweight World Grand Prix runner-up.

As of July 2021, Combat Press ranks him as the #3 bantamweight in the world. He has been ranked in the top ten since November 2020.

== Kickboxing career ==
=== Early career ===
Asahisa made his professional debut against Eiko Kamikawa at Pound for Pound vol.1 on November 24, 2012. He won the fight by a second-round knockout.

Asahisa was scheduled to face KOUMA at M-fight - Suk WEERASAKRECK II on June 16, 2013. He suffered his first professional loss, losing by unanimous decision. All three judges scored the bout 29–28 for KOUMA.

Asahisa rebounded from his first loss with a first-round knockout of Yuki Miyazaki at MAJKF KICK GUTS 2014 on June 16, 2014.

=== Krush ===
Asahisa made his Krush debut against Shoya Masumoto at Krush.49 on January 4, 2015. He lost the fight by a third-round technical knockout, succumbing to a series of punches with 10 seconds left in the bout.

Asahisa was scheduled to face Kento Ito at Krush.52 on March 14, 2015. He won the fight by majority decision.

Asahisa was scheduled to face Hikaru Fujihashi at Krush.54 on May 4, 2015. He won the fight by unanimous decision, with scores of 29–28, 29–28 and 30–28.

Asahisa was scheduled to fight a rematch with Shoya Masumoto at Krush.56 on August 14, 2015. Masumoto was once again victorious, winning the fight by majority decision. Two of the judges scored the fight 29–28 in his favor, while the third judge scored it as a 28–28 draw.

Asahisa was scheduled to face the undefeated Kaito Ozawa at Krush.59 on October 4, 2015. He won the closely contested bout by majority decision, with scores of 30–29, 30–29 and 29–29.

Asahisa was scheduled to fight Tatsuya Oiwa at Krush.62 on January 17, 2016. He won the fight by unanimous decision, with scores of 30–28, 30–27 and 30–27.

Asahisa was scheduled to face Sano Tenma at Krush.64 on March 20, 2016. Tenma came into the fight undefeated, on an 11-fight winning streak. Asahisa won the fight by unanimous decision, with scores of 30–29, 30–28 and 30–28.

Asahisa made his K-1 debut against Yuta Otaki at K-1 World GP 2016 -57.5 kg World Tournament on November 3, 2016. He won the fight by unanimous decision, with all three judges scoring the fight 30–27.

=== Wu Lin Feng ===
==== Super Featherweight tournament ====
Asahisa made his Wu Lin Feng debut against Zhao Chongyang at Wu Lin Feng 2017: Kung Fu VS Muay Thai on March 4, 2017, in the super featherweight tournament round of 16. Asahisa beat Chongyang by unanimous decision, and won the quarterfinal bout against Zhao Fuxiang in the same manner.

Two months later, on May 6, 2021, Asahisa was scheduled to face Ncedo Gomba in the tournament semifinal. He won the fight by unanimous decision, and advanced to the tournament finals, where he faced Javier Hernandez. Hernandez won the final by a unanimous decision, after an extra round was fought.

==== Between the tournaments ====
Asahisa was scheduled to fight a rematch with Zhao Chongyang at Wu Lin Feng 2017: World Championship Xi'an on September 2, 2017. He won the fight by unanimous decision.

Asahisa was scheduled to fight Shoya Masumoto, for the third time in his professional career, at Krush.82 on November 5, 2017. Masumoto won the fight by unanimous decision, with scores of 30–27, 30–27 and 29–27, bringing his overall score against Asahisa to 0–3.

Asahisa was scheduled to face Li Ning at Wu Lin Feng 2018: World Championship in Shenzhen on February 3, 2018. He won the fight by decision.

==== WLF Super Featherweight champion ====
Asahisa participated in the 2018 WLF Super Featherweight tournament, held on March 10, 2018. He was scheduled to face Chen Wende in the quarterfinals, and won by a first-round knockout. Following a decision win against Djany Fiorenti in the semifinals, Asahisa faced Zhao Chongyang in the tournament finals, for the third time in his career. He held two decision wins against Chongyang heading into the bout. Their third meeting was ruled a draw after the first three rounds were fought, and accordingly went into an extra round. Asahisa knocked Chongyang out with a flying knee, 21 seconds into the extension round.

Asahisa was scheduled to face the reigning Krush Featherweight champion Haruma Saikyo in the quarterfinals of the 2nd K-1 Featherweight Championship Tournament, held on June 17, 2018. Saikyo won the fight by majority decision, with two of the judges scoring the fight 29–28 and 30–29 in his favor, while the third judge scored the fight 29–28 for Asahisa.

Asahisa was scheduled to face Fang Feida in a non–title bout at Wu Lin Feng 2018: WLF -67kg World Cup 2018-2019 4th Round on October 6, 2018. He won the fight by a second-round technical knockout.

Asahisa made his first title defense against Wang Junyu at Wu Lin Feng 2019: WLF World Cup 2018-2019 Final on January 19, 2019. He won the fight by a fourth-round flying knee knockout.

Asahisa returned from a twelve-month layoff to face Zhu Shuai in a non-title bout at Wu Lin Feng 2020: WLF World Cup 2019-2020 Final on January 11, 2020. He lost the fight by unanimous decision.

Asahisa was scheduled to face Tatsuya Oiwa at K-1 World GP 2020 in Fukuoka on November 3, 2020. He won the fight by unanimous decision, with all three judges scoring the bout 30–27 in his favor.

Asahisa was scheduled to face Momotaro at K-1 World GP 2021: Yokohamatsuri on September 20, 2021. He won the fight by a first-round knockout. Asahisa knocked Momotaro down with a left hook, with 30 seconds left in the round. He followed this up with a second left hook at the 2:59 minute mark, which left Momotaro unable to beat the eight count.

Asahisa was scheduled to face Yuta Murakoshi at K-1: K'Festa 5 on April 3, 2022. Asahisa won by knockout in the first round, he knocked down his opponent with a high kick and forced the referee to stop the action when he floored Murakoshi for the second time with a jumping knee.

=== K-1 ===
==== K-1 Super Featherweight Grand Prix ====
On June 15, 2022, it was announced that Asahisa would be one of eight participants in the 2022 K-1 Super Featherweight World Grand Prix, held to fill the throne left vacant by Takeru Segawa. Asahisa was booked to face Nakrob Fairtex in the quarterfinals of the one-day tournament, which was held at K-1 World GP 2022 Yokohamatsuri on September 11, 2022. He made quick work of his opponent, stopping him with a left hook to the body 44 seconds into the fight. Asahisa faced the one-time Krush Super Featherweight title challenger Tomoya Yokoyama in the tournament semifinals. He needed just 37 seconds to knock Yokoyama down twice, which resulted in a technical knockout victory for him under the K-1 Grand Prix rules. Asahisa failed to capture the vacant title however, as he suffered a narrow unanimous decision loss to Leona Pettas in the tournament finals.

==== Continued WLF title reign ====
Asahisa made his second WLF super featherweight title defense against Yang Ming at Wu Lin Feng 537 on May 2, 2023. He won the fight by unanimous decision.

Asahisa faced Jin Ying in a non-title bout at Wu Lin Feng 1000th Broadcast Anniversary on November 25, 2023. He lost the fight by unanimous decision.

Asahisa faced Wei Weiyang at Wu Lin Feng 2024: 12th Global Kung Fu Festival on January 27, 2024. He relinquished the Wu Lin Feng -60 kg World title before the fight.

Asahisa faced Rémi Parra at K-1 World MAX 2024 - World Tournament Opening Round on March 20, 2024, as a replacement for Leona Pettas. He won the fight by unanimous decision.

Asahisa faced Zhang Lanpei at Wu Lin Feng 545 on July 23, 2024. He won the fight by unanimous decision.

On November 30, 2024, Asahisa took part in a four-man qualifier tournament at Wu Lin Feng 550. In the semifinals he defeated Zhang Jingtao by unanimous decision. In the finals he defeated Zhu Shuai by unanimous decision after scoring a high kick knockdown in the second round and qualified for the 2024-2025 Wu Lin Feng World MAX 63kg Tournament Final. Asahisa faced Ji Zhize in the semifinals of the tournament final at Wu Lin Feng 2025 Global Kung Fu Festival on January 25, 2025.

Asahisa was scheduled to take part in the 2025 Wu Lin Feng World MAX 63kg Tournament Final at the Wu Lin Feng 2025 Global Kung Fu Festival on January 25, 2025. In the semifinals he faced Ji Zhize. He won the fight by unanimous decision. In the final he faced Giorgi Malania who defeated him by first round technical knockout after three knockdowns.

Asahisa made his return to K-1 on July 13, 2025, in order to face Bryan Lang at K-1 Dontaku. He won the fight by a first-round technical knockout.

On November 15, 2025, it was announced that Asahisa would face the reigning Krush Lightweight (-62.5 kg) champion Yuzuki Satomi for the vacant K-1 Lightweight (-62.5kg) title at K-1 World GP 2026 -90kg World Tournament on February 8, 2026. He lost the fight by unanimous decision, after an extra fourth round was contested.

== Titles and accomplishments ==
- Wu Lin Feng
  - 2017 Wu Lin Feng -60kg World Tournament runner-up
  - 2018 Wu Lin Feng -60kg Championship Tournament winner
  - 2018 Wu Lin Feng -60 kg World Champion
    - Two successful title defenses
  - 2025 Wu Lin Feng World MAX 63 kg Tournament runner-up
- K-1
  - 2022 K-1 Super Featherweight World Grand Prix runner-up

== Kickboxing record ==
Kickboxing record
33 wins (11 (T)KOs), 11 losses, 0 draws, 0 no contests
Date	Result	Opponent	Event	Location	Method	Round	Time
2026-12-29		(Japan) Yuzuki Satomi	K-1 World MAX 2026 - World Championship Tournament Final	Yokohama, Japan			
2026-02-08	Loss	(Japan) Yuzuki Satomi	K-1 World GP 2026 - 90kg World Tournament	Tokyo, Japan	Ext.R decision (unanimous)	4	3:00
For the vacant K-1 Lightweight (-62.5kg) title.
2025-07-13	Win	(France) Bryan Lang	K-1 Dontaku	Fukuoka, Japan	KO (body punches)	1	2:58
2025-01-25	Loss	(Georgia (country)) Giorgi Malania	Wu Lin Feng 2025 Global Kung Fu Festival - MAX 63 kg Tournament, Final	Tangshan, China	TKO (3 knockdowns)	1	2:54
For the 2025 Wu Lin Feng World MAX 63kg Tournament Final title.
2025-01-25	Win	(China) Ji Zhize	Wu Lin Feng 2025 Global Kung Fu Festival - MAX 63 kg Tournament, Semifinals	Tangshan, China	Decision (unanimous)	3	3:00
2024-11-30	Win	(China) Zhu Shuai	Wu Lin Feng 550 - 63 kg Qualifier Tournament, Final	Tangshan, China	Decision (unanimous)	3	3:00
Qualifies for the 2025 Wu Lin Feng World MAX 63kg Tournament Final.
2024-11-30	Win	(China) Zhang Jingtao	Wu Lin Feng 550 - 63 kg Qualifier Tournament, Semifinals	Tangshan, China	Decision (unanimous)	3	3:00
2024-07-23	Win	(China) Zhang Lanpei	Wu Lin Feng 545	Xinxing, Xinjiang, China	Decision (unanimous)	3	3:00
2024-03-20	Win	(France) Rémi Parra	K-1 World MAX 2024 - World Tournament Opening Round	Tokyo, Japan	Decision (unanimous)	3	3:00
2024-01-27	Win	(China) Wei Weiyang	Wu Lin Feng 2024: 12th Global Kung Fu Festival	Tangshan, China	Decision (unanimous)	3	3:00
2023-11-25	Loss	(China) Jin Ying	Wu Lin Feng 1000th Broadcast Anniversary	Tangshan, China	Decision (unanimous)	3	3:00
2023-05-02	Win	(China) Yang Ming	Wu Lin Feng 537	Tangshan, China	Decision (unanimous)	5	3:00
Defends the Wu Lin Feng -60 kg World title.
2022-09-11	Loss	(Japan) Leona Pettas	K-1 World GP 2022 Yokohamatsuri, Tournament Final	Yokohama, Japan	Decision (unanimous)	3	3:00
For the vacant K-1 Super Featherweight title.
2022-09-11	Win	(Japan) Tomoya Yokoyama	K-1 World GP 2022 Yokohamatsuri, Tournament Semifinals	Yokohama, Japan	TKO (two knockdowns)	1	0:37
2022-09-11	Win	(Thailand) Nakrob Fairtex	K-1 World GP 2022 Yokohamatsuri, Tournament Quarterfinals	Yokohama, Japan	KO (left hook to the body)	1	0:44
2022-04-03	Win	(Japan) Yuta Murakoshi	K-1: K'Festa 5	Tokyo, Japan	KO (jumping knee)	1	1:42
2021-09-20	Win	(Japan) Momotaro	K-1 World GP 2021: Yokohamatsuri	Yokohama, Japan	KO (left hook)	1	2:59
2020-11-03	Win	(Japan) Tatsuya Oiwa	K-1 World GP 2020 in Fukuoka	Fukuoka, Japan	Decision (unanimous)	3	3:00
2020-01-11	Loss	(China) Zhu Shuai	Wu Lin Feng 2020: WLF World Cup 2019-2020 Final	Zhuhai, China	Decision (unanimous)	3	3:00
2019-01-19	Win	(China) Wang Junyu	Wu Lin Feng 2019: WLF World Cup 2018-2019 Final	Haikou, China	KO (flying knee)	4	
Defends the Wu Lin Feng -60 kg World title.
2018-10-06	Win	(China) Fang Feida	Wu Lin Feng 2018: WLF -67kg World Cup 2018-2019 4th Round	Shangqiu, China	TKO	2	0:51
2018-06-17	Loss	(Japan) Haruma Saikyo	K-1 World GP 2018: 2nd Featherweight Championship Tournament, Quarterfinals	Saitama, Japan	Decision (split)	3	3:00
2018-03-10	Win	(China) Zhao Chongyang	Wu Lin Feng 2018: -60kg World Championship Tournament, Final	Jiaozuo, China	Ext.R KO (flying knee)	4	0:21
Wins the vacant Wu Lin Feng -60 kg World title.
2018-03-10	Win	(France) Djany Fiorenti	Wu Lin Feng 2018: -60kg World Championship Tournament, Semifinals	Jiaozuo, China	Decision	3	3:00
2018-03-10	Win	(China) Chen Wende	Wu Lin Feng 2018: -60kg World Championship Tournament, Quarterfinals	Jiaozuo, China	KO (punches)	1	
2018-02-03	Win	(China) Li Ning	Wu Lin Feng 2018: World Championship in Shenzhen	Shenzhen, China	Decision	3	3:00
2017-11-05	Loss	(Japan) Shoya Masumoto	Krush.82	Tokyo, Japan	Decision (unanimous)	3	3:00
2017-09-02	Win	(China) Zhao Chongyang	Wu Lin Feng 2017: World Championship Xi'an	Xi'an, China	Decision (unanimous)	3	3:00
2017-05-06	Loss	(Spain) Javier Hernandez	Wu Lin Feng 2017: 60 kg World Tournament, Final	Zhengzhou, China	Ext.R decision (unanimous)	4	3:00
For the vacant Wu Lin Feng -60 kg World title.
2017-05-06	Win	(South Africa) Ncedo Gomba	Wu Lin Feng 2017: 60 kg World Tournament Semi Finals	Zhengzhou, China	Decision (unanimous)	3	3:00
2017-03-04	Win	(China) Zhao Fuxiang	Wu Lin Feng 2017: 60 kg World Tournament, Quarter Finals	Zhengzhou, China	Decision (unanimous)	3	3:00
2017-03-04	Win	(China) Zhao Chongyang	Wu Lin Feng 2017: 60 kg World Tournament, 1/8 Finals	Zhengzhou, China	Decision (unanimous)	3	3:00
2016-11-03	Win	(Japan) Yuta Otaki	K-1 World GP 2016 -57.5 kg World Tournament	Tokyo, Japan	Decision (unanimous)	3	3:00
2016-06-04	Win	(China) Li Ning	Wu Lin Feng vs Krush	China	Decision	3	3:00
2016-03-20	Win	(Japan) Tenma Sano	Krush.64	Tokyo, Japan	Decision (unanimous)	3	3:00
2016-01-17	Win	(Japan) Tatsuya Oiwa	Krush.62	Tokyo, Japan	Decision (unanimous)	3	3:00
2015-10-04	Win	(Japan) Kaito Ozawa	Krush.59	Tokyo, Japan	Decision (majority)	3	3:00
2015-08-14	Loss	(Japan) Shoya Masumoto	Krush.56	Tokyo, Japan	Decision (majority)	3	3:00
2015-05-04	Win	(Japan) Hikaru Fujihashi	Krush.54	Tokyo, Japan	Decision (unanimous)	3	3:00
2015-03-14	Win	(Japan) Kento Ito	Krush.52	Tokyo, Japan	Decision (majority)	3	3:00
2015-01-04	Loss	(Japan) Shoya Masumoto	Krush.49	Tokyo, Japan	TKO (punches)	3	2:50
2014-08-10	Win	(Japan) Yuki Miyazaki	MAJKF KICK GUTS 2014	Tokyo, Japan	KO	1	
2013-06-16	Loss	(Japan) KOUMA	M-fight - Suk WEERASAKRECK II	Tokyo, Japan	Decision (unanimous)	3	3:00
2012-11-24	Win	(Japan) Eiko Kamikawa	Pound for Pound vol.1	Kyushu, Japan	KO	2	
Legend: Win Loss Draw/no contest Notes

Amateur kickboxing record (incomplete)
11 wins (2 (T)KOs), 3 losses
Date	Result	Opponent	Event	Location	Method	Round	Time
2014-07-21	Loss	(Japan) Tenma Sano	K-1 Koshien 2014 Tournament, Semi Final	Tokyo, Japan	Decision (unanimous)	1	2:00
2014-07-21	Win	(Japan) Tatsuya Sawaya	K-1 Koshien 2014 Tournament, Quarter Final	Tokyo, Japan	Extra round decision (split)	2	2:00
2014-07-21	Win	(Japan) Shishido	K-1 Koshien 2014 Tournament, Second Round	Tokyo, Japan	Decision (unanimous)	1	2:00
2014-07-21	Win	(Japan) Naoki Ueda	K-1 Koshien 2014 Tournament, First Round	Tokyo, Japan	Decision (unanimous)	1	2:00
2011-06-19	Win	(Japan) Jun Kato	M-1 Amateur Muay Thai Kyushu 3, -50 kg Tournament Final	Fukuoka, Japan	Decision (unanimous)	2	2:00
2011-06-19	Win	(Japan) Riku Kojima	M-1 Amateur Muay Thai Kyushu 3, -50 kg Tournament Semi Final	Fukuoka, Japan	Decision (unanimous)	2	2:00
2011-06-19	Win	(Japan) Yu	M-1 Amateur Muay Thai Kyushu 3, -50 kg Tournament Quarter Final	Fukuoka, Japan	Decision (unanimous)	2	2:00
2011-01-10	Loss	(Japan) Katsuki Nogami	M-1 Amateur Muay Thai Kyushu 2	Fukuoka, Japan	Decision	2	2:00
Legend: Win Loss Draw/no contest Notes

== See also ==
- List of male kickboxers
