= Zhao Chongyang =

Chinese kickboxer (born 1997)

- Born: 赵崇阳; June 17, 1997 (age 29); Zhengzhou, China
- Nickname: "The Harvester"
- Height: 1.72 m (5 ft 7 1/2 in)
- Weight: 60 kg (130 lb; 9.4 st)
- Division: Flyweight
- Style: Kickboxing
- Stance: Orthodox
- Fighting out of: China
- Team: X-Level Fighting Club
- Years active: 2016–present

Kickboxing record
- Total: 60
- Wins: 41
- By knockout: 22
- Losses: 19
- By knockout: 7

Zhao Chongyang (Chinese: 赵崇阳, born June 17, 1997) is a Chinese kickboxer, currently signed with Wu Lin Feng. He is the former Enfusion -60 kg champion, the 2018 Wu Lin Feng World and 2018 Wu Lin Feng China -60 Tournament runner-up.

Zhao was ranked as a top ten flyweight kickboxer by Combat Press between September 2019 and July 2020, as well as a top ten bantamweight kickboxer between February 2021 and April 2022.

== Kickboxing career ==
Zhao participated in the Kunlun Fight 74 8 man tournament. He won the first fight against Saeksan Or. Kwanmuang, but was forced to withdraw from the tournament due to injury.

Zhao faced Leona Pettas at Krush 90 on July 22, 2018. He lost the fight by a second round knockout.

Zhao fought during the Wu Lin Feng: Australia vs China event, with his opponent being Mark Mullan. Zhao won the fight by a third-round KO.

Zhao faced Pietro Doorje for the vacant Enfusion -60 kg championship at Wu Lin Feng 2019: WLF -67kg World Cup 2019-2020 3rd Group Stage on August 31, 2019. He won the fight by a first-round knockout.

Following a brief pause in kickboxing events during the COVID-19 pandemic, Zhao fought at Wu Lin Feng 2020: King's Super Cup 1st Group Stage on May 15, 2020, against Fang Feida. He lost the fight by a first-round knockout .

Zhao faced Jin Ying at Wu Lin Feng King's Super Cup 2nd Group Stage on June 13, 2020. He lost the fight by a first-round technical knockout, due to repeated left hooks.

Zhao faced Yang Hua at Wu Lin Feng 2021: WLF on Haihua Island on October 30, 2021. He won the fight by a second-round technical knockout.

Zhao faced Ali Zarinfar at Wu Lin Feng 2023: Chinese New Year on February 4, 2023. He lost by unanimous decision.

Zhao took part in a four-man tournament on September 28, 2024 at Wu Lin Feng 548. In the semifinals he defeated Daniel Puertas Gallardo by knockout with low kicks in the second round. In the final he faced Jin Ying and defeated him by unanimous decision after scoring two knockdowns.

== Titles and accomplishments ==
- Wu Lin Feng
  - 2018 Wu Lin Feng World −60 kg Tournament runner-up
  - 2020 Wu Lin Feng China −60 kg Tournament runner-up
- Enfusion
  - 2019 Enfusion −60 kg Championship

== Kickboxing record ==
Professional kickboxing record
42 wins (23 (T)KOs), 19 losses, 0 draws
Date	Result	Opponent	Event	Location	Method	Round	Time
2026-12-11		(Thailand) Sangarthit Looksaikongdin	The Inner Circle 42, Lumpinee Stadium	Bangkok, Thailand			
2026-08-28	Loss	(Japan) Yuri Tanaka	ONE Friday Fights 168, Lumpinee Stadium	Bangkok, Thailand	Decision (unanimous)	3	3:00
2025-09-12	Win	(Iran) Arman Moradi	ONE Friday Fights 124, Lumpinee Stadium	Bangkok, Thailand	KO (high kick)	2	2:57
2025-01-25	Loss	(Georgia (country)) Giorgi Malania	Wu Lin Feng 2025 Global Kung Fu Festival - MAX 63 kg Tournament, Semifinals	Tangshan, China	Decision (unanimous)	3	3:00
2024-09-28	Win	(China) Jin Ying	Wu Lin Feng 548 - 63 kg World Tournament A Group, Final	Tangshan, China	Decision (unanimous)	3	3:00
Qualifies for the 2024-2025 Wu Lin Feng World MAX 63kg Tournament Final.
2024-09-28	Win	(Spain) Daniel Puertas	Wu Lin Feng 548 - 63 kg World Tournament A Group, Semifinal	Tangshan, China	KO (low kicks)	2	1:00
2024-01-27	Loss	(Spain) Daniel Puertas	Wu Lin Feng 2024: 12th Global Kung Fu Festival	Tangshan, China	KO (left hook)	1	0:50
2023-11-25	Win	(Algeria) Adam Larfi	Wu Lin Feng 1000th Broadcast Celebration	Tangshan, China	Decision (unanimous)	3	3:00
2023-06-24	Win	(Thailand) Mongkolpetch Petchyindee Academy	Wu Lin Feng 539	Tangshan, China	Decision (majority)	3	3:00
2023-05-27	Win	(China) Pan Jing	Wu Lin Feng 538	Tangshan, China	KO (low kick)	1	2:30
2023-03-18	Win	(Thailand) Piyanan	Wu Lin Feng 535: China vs Netherlands	Tangshan, China	Decision	3	3:00
2023-02-04	Loss	(Iran) Ali Zarinfar	Wu Lin Feng 2023: Chinese New Year	Tangshan, China	Decision	3	3:00
2022-09-24	Win	(China) Zewa Liluo	Wu Lin Feng 531	Zhengzhou, China	Decision	3	3:00
2022-03-26	Loss	(China) Huang Shuailu	Wu Lin Feng 528, 60 kg 4-man Tournament Semi Final	Zhengzhou, China	Decision (split)	3	3:00
2022-01-01	Win	(Thailand) Peimangkhon	Wu Lin Feng 2022	Tangshan, China	KO (right cross)	3	2:10
2021-10-30	Win	(China) Yang Hua	Wu Lin Feng 2021: WLF on Haihua Island	Daizhou, China	TKO (left high kick)	2	
2021-05-29	Loss	(China) Zhang Lanpei	Wu Lin Feng 2021: World Contender League 4th Stage	Zhengzhou, China	TKO (punches)	2	2:02
2021-03-27	Win	(China) Yang Hua	Wu Lin Feng 2021: World Contender League 1st Stage	China	Decision (unanimous)	3	3:00
2021-01-23	Win	(China) Zhang Lanpei	Wu Lin Feng 2021: Global Kung Fu Festival	Macao, China	Decision	3	3:00
2020-11-14	Loss	(China) Zhang Lanpei	Wu Lin Feng 2020: China 60kg Championship Tournament, Final	Zhengzhou, China	KO (punches & knee)	1	2:05
For the WLF China -60kg title.
2020-11-14	Win	(China) Wang Junyu	Wu Lin Feng 2020: China 60kg Championship Tournament, Semi Final	Zhengzhou, China	Decision (unanimous)	3	3:00
2020-11-14	Win	(China) Li Yuankun	Wu Lin Feng 2020: China 60kg Championship Tournament, Quarter Final	Zhengzhou, China	KO (high knee)	1	0:40
2020-06-13	Loss	(China) Jin Ying	Wu Lin Feng 2020: King's Super Cup 2nd Group Stage	Zhengzhou, China	TKO (left hook)	1	1:48
2020-05-15	Loss	(China) Fang Feida	Wu Lin Feng 2020: King's Super Cup 1st Group Stage	Zhengzhou, China	TKO (2 lnockdowns/punches)	1	2:55
2020-01-11	Win	(Portugal) Frederico Cordeiro	Wu Lin Feng 2020: WLF World Cup 2019-2020 Final	Zhuhai, China	Decision (unanimous)	3	3:00
2019-11-30	Win	(Thailand) Chaophraya Petch Por.Tor.Aor	WLF -67kg World Cup 2019-2020 6th Group Stage	Zhengzhou, China	KO (punches)	1	
2019-10-23	Win	(France) Yannis Osmani	Wu Lin Feng 2019: WLF in Manila	Manila, Philippines	KO (punches)	1	
2019-09-28	Loss	(Thailand) Phitthaya	WLF -67kg World Cup 2019-2020 4th Group Stage -60 kg Contender Tournament Semi Final	Zhengzhou, China	Decision	3	3:00
Decision loss for missed weight at a tournament, Zhao could only win by KO.
2019-08-31	Win	(Netherlands) Pietro Doorje	Wu Lin Feng 2019: WLF -67kg World Cup 2019-2020 3rd Group Stage	Zhengzhou, China	KO	1	
Wins the vacant Enfusion −60kg title.
2019-07-21	Win	(Japan) Kento Ito	Wu Lin Feng 2019: WLF x Krush 103 - China vs Japan	Tokyo, Japan	KO (flying knee)	3	0:16
2019-04-27	Win	(United States) Steve Varela	Wu Lin Feng 2019: WLF -63kg Championship World Tournament	Zhuhai, China	KO (jumping knee)	1	2:01
2019-03-24	Loss	(Greece) Aggelos Giakoumis	Wu Lin Feng 2019: WLF x Gods of War XII - China vs Greece	Athens, Greece	Decision	3	3:00
2019-01-19	Win	(Spain) Jorge Varela	Wu Lin Feng 2019: WLF World Cup 2018-2019 Final	Haikou, China	Decision	3	3:00
2018-12-01	Win	(Japan) KJ Hiroshi	WLF -67kg World Cup 2018-2019 6th Round, -60 kg Contender Tournament Reserve fight	Zhengzhou, China	KO (corner stoppage)	1	2:55
2018-11-04	Win	(Australia) Mark Mullan	Wu Lin Feng: Australia vs China	Melbourne, Australia	KO (left hook)	3	1:20
2018-09-29	Win	(Japan) Shoki Kaneda	World Boxing Championship	China	TKO	3	2:05
2018-07-22	Loss	(Japan) Leona Pettas	Krush.90	Tokyo, Japan	KO (punches)	2	2:49
2018-05-13	Win	(Thailand) Saeksan Or. Kwanmuang	Kunlun Fight 74 – 61.5kg 8 Man Tournament, Quarter Finals	Jinan, China	Decision (majority)	3	3:00
Zhao out of the tournament because of an injury.
2018-03-10	Loss	(Japan) Hirotaka Asahisa	Wu Lin Feng 2018: -60kg World Championship Tournament, Final	Jiaozuo, China	KO (flying knee)	4	
For the vacant Wu Lin Feng -60 kg World title.
2018-03-10	Win	(Spain) Javier Hernandez	Wu Lin Feng 2018: -60kg World Championship Tournament, Semi Finals	Jiaozuo, China	TKO (forfeit)	1	
2018-03-10	Win	(Thailand) Janjao Sitsongpeenong	Wu Lin Feng 2018: -60kg World Championship Tournament, Quarter Finals	Jiaozuo, China	KO (punches)	1	
2018-02-03	Win	(Thailand) Arannchai Kiatpatarapran	Wu Lin Feng 2018: World Championship in Shenzhen	Shenzhen, China	Decision	3	3:00
2017-11-18	Win	(United States) Joe Gogo	Wu Lin Feng 2017: USA vs China	Las Vegas, United States	Decision (majority)	3	3:00
2017-09-02	Loss	(Japan) Hirotaka Asahisa	Wu Lin Feng 2017: World Championship Xi'an	Xi'an, China	Decision (unanimous)	3	3:00
2017-07-01	Win	(Spain) Andres Unzue	Wu Lin Feng 2017: China VS Spain	Zhengzhou, China	KO (right hook)	1	
2017-04-08	Win	(Netherlands) Ilias Ennahachi	Wu Lin Feng	Henan, China	KO (straight right)	1	0:32
2017-03-04	Loss	(Japan) Hirotaka Asahisa	Wu Lin Feng 2017: 60 kg World Tournament, 1/8 Finals	Zhengzhou, China	Decision (unanimous)	3	3:00
2017-02-10	Win	(Laos) Singyai Sorporpor	Wu Lin Feng 2017: Battle of the Golden Triangle	Bokeo Province, Laos	Decision	3	3:00
2016-09-10	Win	(Belarus) Dzianis Klimovich	Wu Lin Feng 2016: World Kickboxing Championship in Shenzhen	Shenzhen, China	Decision	3	3:00
?	Win	(South Africa) Ncedo Gomba	Wu Lin Feng 2017	China	Decision	3	3:00
Legend: Win Loss Draw/no contest Notes

== See also ==
- List of male kickboxers
