= Giorgi Malania =

Georgian kickboxer

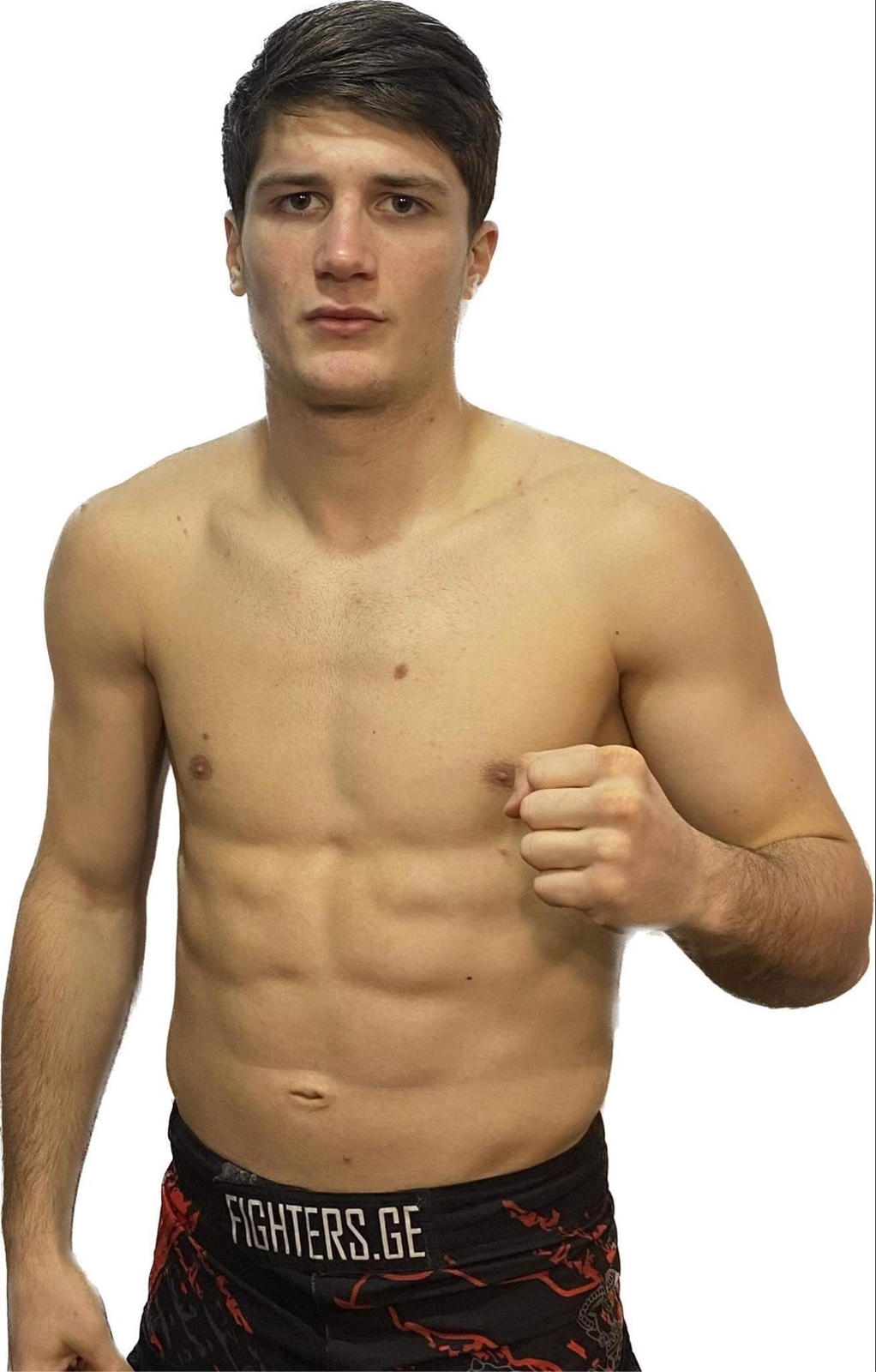
- Born: January 22, 2004 (age 22); Tbilisi, Georgia
- Native name: გიორგი მალანია
- Other names: Georgi Malania
- Height: 1.75 m (5 ft 9 in)
- Weight: 64 kg (141 lb; 10.1 st)
- Style: Kickboxing
- Stance: Orthodox
- Fighting out of: Tbilisi, Georgia
- Team: Team Kiria
- Trainer: Bachuki Partsvania, Mamuka Shonia
- Years active: 2021–present

Kickboxing record
- Total: 22
- Wins: 21
- By knockout: 11
- Losses: 1
- By knockout: 0
- Draws: 0

Other information
- Boxing record from BoxRec

Giorgi Malania (Georgian: გიორგი მალანია) (born January 21, 2004), is a Georgian kickboxer.

As of August 2025, he is ranked as the #1 –64 kg kickboxer in the world by Beyond Kickboxing.

== Background ==
Giorgi was born in Tbilisi in 2004, where his parents moved from Bedia village.

Malania was a highly energetic child, his parents enrolled him in kickboxing at the age of 6. His first coaches were Giorgi Pilashvili and David Purchanadze. At the age of 13 Giorgi began training under Mamuka Shonia and Davit Kiria's coach Bachuki Partsvania.

== Kickboxing career ==
Giorgi Malania made a name on the Georgian promotion MAX Fight where he won two fights in one night against Levan Yankoshvili and Nika Jakonia.

Then he was scheduled to take part in a World 67 kg Tournament at Wu Lin Feng 2023: Chinese New Year where he would face Zhou Jiaqiang in quarterfinals. He lost the fight by unanimous decision.

On September 20, 2024, Malania was scheduled to face Samir Novruzov at the Lotus Cup in Russia. He won the fight by unanimous decision.

On October 26, 2024, at Wu Lin Feng 549 Malania took part in a 4-man qualifier tournament for the upcoming Wu Lin Feng 63 kg World MAX tournament. In the semifinals he defeated Zhang Lanpei by unanimous decision. In the final he defeated Wei Weiyang by unanimous decision.

Malania was scheduled to fight in the 2025 Wu Lin Feng World MAX 63kg Tournament Final at the Wu Lin Feng 2025 Global Kung Fu Festival on January 25, 2025. In the semifinals he faced Zhao Chongyang. He won the fight by unanimous decision. In the final he faced Hirotaka Asahisa who he defeated by first-round technical knockout after three knockdowns.

On September 27, 2025, at Wu Lin Feng 554, Giorgi made his first title defense and secured a victory over Chinese fighter Jin Ying, winning by technical knockout in the third round.

== Personal life ==
As a child, Giorgi was inspired by the legendary Muay Thai fighter and kickboxer Buakaw Banchamek as well as by fellow Georgian fighter - and now teammate - Davit Kiria.

From an early age, Malania has been passionate about football. He enjoys playing in his spare time and is a devoted supporter of the Georgia National Football Team and Khvicha Kvaratskhelia. His favorite Football Club is Real Madrid.

== Championships and awards ==
- Wu Lin Feng
  - 2025 Wu Lin Feng World MAX 63 kg Tournament Winner
  - 2025 Wu Lin Feng World -63kg Champion
    - Two successful title defenses
- MAX Fight League
  - 2024 MFL Featherweight (65 kg) Champion

== Kickboxing record ==
Kickboxing record
21 wins (11 KOs), 1 loss, 0 draw
Date	Result	Opponent	Event	Location	Method	Round	Time
2026-02-01	Win	(China) Zhu Shuai	Wu Lin Feng 2026 Global Kung Fu Festival	Zhengzhou, China	TKO (Doctor stoppage)	3	1:07
Defends the Wu Lin Feng World -63kg title.
2025-09-27	Win	(China) Jin Ying	Wu Lin Feng 554	Tianjin, China	TKO (4 Knockdowns)	3	2:40
Defends the Wu Lin Feng World -63kg title.
2025-01-25	Win	(Japan) Hirotaka Asahisa	Wu Lin Feng 2025 Global Kung Fu Festival - MAX 63 kg Tournament, Final	Tangshan, China	TKO (3 Knockdowns)	1	2:54
Wins the 2025 Wu Lin Feng World MAX 63kg Tournament Final.
2025-01-25	Win	(China) Zhao Chongyang	Wu Lin Feng 2025 Global Kung Fu Festival - MAX 63 kg Tournament, Semifinals	Tangshan, China	Decision (Unanimous)	3	3:00
2024-10-26	Win	(China) Wei Weiyang	Wu Lin Feng 549 - 63 kg Qualifier Tournament, Final	Tangshan, China	Decision (Unanimous)	3	3:00
Qualifies for the 2025 Wu Lin Feng World MAX 63kg Tournament Final.
2024-10-26	Win	(China) Zhang Lanpei	Wu Lin Feng 549 - 63 kg Qualifier Tournament, Semifinals	Tangshan, China	Decision (Unanimous)	3	3:00
2024-09-20	Win	(Russia) Samir Novruzov	Lotus Cup	Elista, Russia	Decision (Unanimous)	3	3:00
2024-08-31	Win	(China) Han Tianxiang	Wu Lin Feng 547	Tangshan, China	Decision (Unanimous)	3	3:00
2024-03-30	Win	(China) Yi Yuxuan	Wu Lin Feng 20th Year Anniversary	Zhengzhou, China	Decision (Unanimous)	3	3:00
2024-02-17	Win	(Armenia) Armen Grigoryan	MAX Fight 6	Tbilisi, Georgia	KO (Punches)	2	1:15
Wins the MAX Fight League Featherweight (-65kg) title.
2023-06-25	Win	(Iran) Reza Mehdi	MAX Fight 4	Tbilisi, Georgia	KO (Left hook to the body)	3	
2023-02-04	Loss	(China) Zhou Jiaqiang	Wu Lin Feng 2023: Chinese New Year - World 67 kg Tournament, Quarterfinals	Zhengzhou, China	Decision (Unanimous)	3	3:00
2022-09-02	Win	(Azerbaijan) Turan Gafarov	GFC 17: Batumi Fight Night	Batumi, Georgia	Decision (Unanimous)	3	3:00
2022-04-15	Win	(Finland) Kristoffer Björkskog	The League III - 67 kg Tournament, Final	Tallinn, Estonia	Ext.R Decision (Unanimous)	4	3:00
2022-04-15	Win	(Estonia) Henry Rohtla	The League III - 67 kg Tournament, Semifinals	Tallinn, Estonia	Decision (Split)	3	3:00
2022-03-27	Win	(Russia) Konstantin Shakhtarin	Ural FC 1	Perm, Russia	Decision (Unanimous)	3	3:00
2022-02-27	Win	(Georgia (country)) Bakar Gelenidze	MAX Fight 2	Tbilisi, Georgia	Decision (Unanimous)	3	3:00
2021-11-23	Win	(Georgia (country)) Nika Jakonia	MAX Fight 1 - Tournament Final	Tbilisi, Georgia	TKO (Punches)	2	1:40
2021-11-23	Win	(Georgia (country)) Levan Yankoshvili	MAX Fight 1 - Tournament Semifinals	Tbilisi, Georgia	Decision (Unanimous)	3	3:00
2021-03-27	Win	(Armenia) Hrach Hambardzumyan	Mix Fight Events 46	Yerevan, Armenia	TKO (retirement)	2	3:00
Legend: Win Loss Draw/No contest Notes

== Karate Combat record ==
Res.	Record	Opponent	Method	Event	Date	Round	Time	Location	Notes
Win	1–0	Adam Noi	KO (punch to the body)	RCC x Karate Combat Fight Night	October 17, 2026	2	1:54	Yekaterinburg, Russia	

== See also ==
- List of male kickboxers
