= 2024 in Wu Lin Feng =

Chinese kickboxing events

Information
- First date: January 27
- Last date: December 28

Events
- Total events: TBD

Fights
- Total fights: TBD
- Title fights: TBD

The year 2024 is the 21st year in the history of the Wu Lin Feng, a Chinese kickboxing promotion. The events were broadcast on Henan Television in mainland China and streamed on Douyin and Xigua Video.

== List of events ==
No.	Event	Date	Venue	City
1	Wu Lin Feng 2024: 12th Global Kung Fu Festival	January 27, 2024	Tangshan Sports Center	Tangshan, China
2	Wu Lin Feng 20th Year Anniversary	March, 2024	Zhengzhou Olympic Sports Center	Zhengzhou, China

== Wu Lin Feng 2024: 12th Global Kung Fu Festival ==
Wu Lin Feng
- Promotion: Wu Lin Feng
- Date: January 27, 2024
- Venue: Tangshan Sports Center
- City: Tangshan, China

Wu Lin Feng 2024: 12th Year Anniversary or Wu Lin Feng 543 will be a kickboxing event held on January 27, 2024, in Tangshan, China.

=== Background ===
A Wu Lin Feng World -67kg championship bout between Jia Aoqi and David Mejia was scheduled to take place at the event.

=== Results ===
Wu Lin Feng 2024: Global Kung Fu Festival
Weight Class				Method	Round	Time	Notes
Kickboxing -70 kg	(China) Ouyang Feng	def.	(Georgia (country)) Davit Kiria	KO (Low kicks)	3	0:23	Kiria was deducted a point for missing weight.
Kickboxing -92 kg	(China) Liu Ce	def.	(Romania) Sebastian Lutaniuc	TKO (Low kicks)	1	2:48	For the vacant ISKA K-1 Intercontinental -95kg title.
Kickboxing -67 kg	(China) Jia Aoqi	def.	(Spain) David Mejia	Decision	5	3:00	For the vacant Wu Lin Feng World -67kg title.
Kickboxing -63 kg	(Japan) Hirotaka Asahisa	def.	(China) Wei Weiyang	Decision (Unanimous)	3	3:00	
Kickboxing -63 kg	(China) Zhang Lanpei	def.	(Thailand) Petchdam Petchyindee Academy	Decision (Unanimous)	3	3:00	
Kickboxing -63 kg	(Spain) Daniel Puertas	def.	(China) Zhao Chongyang	KO (Left hook)	1	0:50	
Kickboxing -67 kg	(China) Zhou Jiaiqang	def.	(Russia) Kirill Khomutov	Decision	3	3:00	
Kickboxing -67 kg	(Georgia (country)) Gabunia Nakhtangt	def.	(China) Cai Jiehui	Decision	3	3:00	
W.Kickboxing -52 kg	(China) Li Lishan	def.	(Thailand) Kamlaipetch Ayothaya	Decision	3	3:00	
Kickboxing -71 kg	(China) Chen Yonghui	def.	(Russia) Sergey Kosykh	Decision	3	3:00	
Kickboxing -65 kg	(China) Meng Guodong	def.	(Thailand) Suksa-Woei Prasitchai	Decision	3	3:00	
Kickboxing -63 kg	(China) Ji Zhize	def.	(New Zealand) Reid Miller	Decision	3	3:00	

== Wu Lin Feng 20th Year Anniversary ==
Wu Lin Feng
- Promotion: Wu Lin Feng
- Date: March 30, 2024
- Venue: Zhenzhou Olympic Sport Center
- City: Zhengzhou, China

Wu Lin Feng 20th Year Anniversary will be a kickboxing event held on March 30, 2024, in Zhengzhou, China.

=== Results ===
Wu Lin Feng 20th Year Anniversary
Weight Class				Method	Round	Time	Notes
Kickboxing -66 kg	(China) Meng Gaofeng	def.	(Kazakhstan) Alikhan Ozdoyev	Decision	3	3:00	
Kickboxing -67 kg	(China) Zhu Shuai	def.	(Thailand) Yodkhunpon Moothong Academy	Decision (Unanimous)	3	3:00	
Kickboxing -55 kg	(China) Wang Junguang	def.	(Thailand) Jaroengern	KO (Spinning back kick)	1		
Kickboxing -58 kg	(China) Li Mingrui	def.	(Iran) Vish	Decision	3	3:00	Li missed weight and was deducted a point.
Kickboxing -72 kg	(Georgia (country)) Lado Gabisonia	def.	(China) Ji Long Teng	Decision	3	3:00	
Kickboxing -65 kg	(China) Shun Li	def.	(Greece) Kostas Papadopoulos	Decision	3	3:00	
Kickboxing -75 kg	(China) Xu Yuanqing	def.	(France) Dawson Delys	Decision	3	3:00	
Kickboxing -64 kg	(Brazil) Matheus Correia	def.	(China) Wang Shenglong	Decision	3	3:00	
Kickboxing -58 kg	(China) Zhang Yong	def.	(Thailand) Nawakhunyingyong Suphakit	KO (Body kick)	3		
Kickboxing -66 kg	(Georgia (country)) Giorgi Malania	def.	(China) Yi Yuxuan	Decision (Unanimous)	3	3:00	

== Wu Lin Feng 2024: Hungary vs China ==
Wu Lin Feng
- Promotion: Wu Lin Feng; Perfect Fight Club
- Date: April 6, 2024
- Venue: Szigetszentmiklósi Városi Sportcsarnok
- City: Budapest, Hungary

Wu Lin Feng 2024: Hungary vs China will be a kickboxing event held on April 6, 2024, in Budapest, Hungary.

=== Results ===
Wu Lin Feng 2024: Hungary vs China
Weight Class				Method	Round	Time	Notes
Kickboxing 70 kg	(China) Luo Chao	def.	(Hungary) Fábián Kristóf	Decision	3	3:00	
Kickboxing 77 kg	(Hungary) Zoltan Nardelotti	def.	(China) Li Hui	Decision	3	3:00	
Kickboxing 80 kg	(Hungary) Toth Csaba	def.	(China) Bo Fufan	Decision	3	3:00	
Kickboxing 52 kg	(Hungary) Furo Virag	def.	(China) Li Lishan	Disqualification	1		
Kickboxing 70 kg	(China) Huang Yuanzhe	def.	(Hungary) David Adler	TKO (retirement)	2	3:00	
Kickboxing 63.5 kg	(China) Ji Zhize	def.	(Hungary) Zalan Forgo	Decision	3	3:00	
Kickboxing 65 kg	(China) Kong Dexiang	def.	(Hungary) Robert Geczei	TKO (Corner stoppage)	2		
Kickboxing 90 kg	(Hungary) Balazs Kiss	def.	(China) Zhang Chengcheng	Decision	3	3:00	
Kickboxing 67 kg	(China) Caijie Hui	def.	(Hungary) Dominik Horvath	TKO (Punches)	2		
Kickboxing 75 kg	(Hungary) Dominik Bereczki	def.	(China) Liu Mengyang	Decision	3	3:00	

== Wu Lin Feng 2024: Cambodia vs China ==
Wu Lin Feng
- Promotion: Wu Lin Feng; Ganzberg Kun Khmer
- Date: May 11, 2024
- City: Cambodia

Wu Lin Feng 2024: Cambodia vs China will be a kickboxing event held on May 14, 2024, in Cambodia.

=== Results ===
Wu Lin Feng 2024: Cambodia vs China
Weight Class				Method	Round	Time	Notes
Kun Khmer 73 kg	(Cambodia) Thoeun Theara	def.	(China) Ji Long Theng	KO (Right cross)	1	3:00	
Kickboxing 71 kg	(China) Luo Chao	def.	(Cambodia) Roeung Sophorn	TKO (3 Knockdowns/Body shots)	2	0:57	
Kickboxing 65 kg	(China) Zhang Lanpei	def.	(Cambodia) Phal Sophorn	Decision	3	3:00	
Kickboxing 60 kg	(Cambodia) Pich Sambath	def.	(China) Wang Zunyang	Decision	3	3:00	
Kun Khmer 60 kg	(Cambodia) Chhut Seryvanthong	def.	(China) Zewa Liluo	Decision	3	3:00	
Kun Khmer 67 kg	(Cambodia) Pheakdey Kunkhmer	def.	(China) Yan Xuhao	Decision	3	3:00	
Kun Khmer 60 kg	(Cambodia) Sun Kunkhmer	def.	(China) Lan Shanteng	Decision	3	3:00	
Kun Khmer 65 kg	(Cambodia) Meun Mekkhea	def.	(China) Su Kexin	Decision	3	3:00	
Kickboxing 57 kg	(Cambodia) Him Kimreang	def.	(China) Wu Yutong	Decision	3	3:00	
Kickboxing 70 kg	(China) Li Changbang	def.	(Cambodia) Kham Klareach	Decision	3	3:00	

== Wu Lin Feng 545 ==
Wu Lin Feng
- Promotion: Wu Lin Feng
- Date: July 23, 2024
- City: Xinxing, Xinjiang, China

Wu Lin Feng 545 will be a kickboxing event held on July 23, 2024, in Xinxing, Xinjiang, China.

=== Results ===
Wu Lin Feng 545
Weight Class				Method	Round	Time	Notes
Kickboxing 63 kg	(Japan) Hirotaka Asahisa	def.	(China) Zhang Lanpei	Decision (Unanimous)	3	3:00	Wu Lin Feng World -63kg title eliminator
Kickboxing Openweight	(China) Guo Wuyuan	vs.	(South Korea) Ahn Seok Hee				
Kickboxing 77 kg	(China) Li Hui	def.	(Russia) Alimpasha Tanbiev	Decision (Unanimous)	3	3:00	
Kickboxing 70 kg	(China) Ai Ze	def.	(Brazil) Evaldo Santos	TKO (Low kick)	2	0:31	
MMA 62 kg	(China) Maimati Tuhoati	vs.	(Brazil) Gabriel Castro				
Kickboxing 60 kg	(China) Zewa Liluo	vs.	(Georgia (country)) Temur Tchezhia				
Kickboxing 56 kg	(China) Meng Bian	def.	(Japan) Shoji Rikuto	KO	2		

== Wu Lin Feng 546 ==
Wu Lin Feng
- Promotion: Wu Lin Feng
- Date: July 27, 2024
- City: Tangshan, China

Wu Lin Feng 546 will be a multi discipline combat sports event held on July 27, 2024, in Tangshan, China.

=== Results ===
Wu Lin Feng 546
Weight Class				Method	Round	Time	Notes
Boxing 115 lbs	(China) Cao Jiangtao (c)	def.	(Japan) Akira Hoshuyama	Decision (Unanimous)	10	3:00	For the WBC Asian Super Flyweight title
Kickboxing 67 kg	(Ukraine) Serhii Adamchuk	def.	(China) Han Tianxiang	Decision	3	3:00	
MMA Heavyweight	(China) Li Hang	vs.	(Russia) Dmitriy Vezhenko				
Kickboxing 74 kg	(China) Han Wenbao	def.	(Thailand) Saiyok Pumpanmuang	Decision (Unanimous)	3	3:00	
Sanda 90 kg	(China) Wang Shaohua	def.	(Iran) Pedram Mohammadazimi	Decision	3	3:00	
Muay Thai 63 kg	(Thailand) Pinpetch Banchamek	def.	(China) Su Kexin	Decision (Unanimous)	3	3:00	
Kickboxing 71 kg	(China) Luo Chao	def.	(Russia) Aleksei Ulianov	Decision (Unanimous)	3	3:00	

== Wu Lin Feng Direct Digital Show ==
Wu Lin Feng Direct Digital Show
- Promotion: Wu Lin Feng
- Date: August 16, 2024
- Venue: Henan Radio and Television Station
- City: Zhengzhou, China

Wu Lin Feng Direct Digital Show was a multi discipline combat sports event held on August 16, 2024, in Zhengzhou, China.

=== Results ===
Wu Lin Feng
Weight Class				Method	Round	Time	Notes
Muay Thai 67 kg	(China) Wang Jinbiao	vs.	(China) Wang Huan				4-man 67kg tournament final
Muay Thai 57 kg	(China) Yan Luce	vs.	(China) Ma Qiang				4-man 57kg tournament final
Kickboxing 57 kg	(China) Zhang Yong	def.	(China) Li Haiyang	TKO	3	2:44	China 57kg tournament final
Kickboxing 63 kg	(China) Yang Hua	def.	(China) Zhang Jingtao	Decision	3	3:00	China 63kg tournament final
Kickboxing 67 kg	(China) Yi Yuxuan	def.	(China) Zhang Kui	Ext.R Decision	4	3:00	China 67kg tournament final
Muay Thai 67 kg	(China) Wang Jinbiao	def.	(China) Song Kaiwen				4-man 67kg tournament semifinals
Muay Thai 67 kg	(China) Wang Huan	def.	(China) Li Yongtian				4-man 67kg tournament semifinals
Muay Thai 57 kg	(China) Ma Qiang	def.	(China) Xu Lei	TKO			4-man 57kg tournament semifinals
Muay Thai 57 kg	(China) Yan Luce	def.	(China) Tang Qiyong	Decision	3	3:00	4-man 57kg tournament semifinals
Kickboxing 57 kg	(China) Zhang Yong	def.	(China) Zhao Zhengdong	Decision	3	3:00	China 57kg tournament semifinals
Kickboxing 57 kg	(China) Li Haiyang	def.	(China) Wei Mingyang	Decision	3	3:00	China 57kg tournament semifinals
Kickboxing 63 kg	(China) Zhang Jingtao	def.	(China) Zewa Liluo	Decision	3	3:00	China 63kg tournament semifinals
Kickboxing 63 kg	(China) Yang Hua	def.	(China) Wang Zunwei	Decision	3	3:00	China 63kg tournament semifinals
Kickboxing 67 kg	(China) Yi Yuxuan	def.	(China) Zhang Xinbo	Decision	3	3:00	China 67kg tournament semifinals
Kickboxing 67 kg	(China) Zhang Kui	def.	(China) Er Kang	Decision	3	3:00	China 67kg tournament semifinals
Kickboxing 57 kg	(China) Zhang Yong	def.	(China)	Decision	3	3:00	China 57kg tournament quarterfinals
Kickboxing 57 kg	(China) Wei Mingyang	def.	(China) Zhang Haiyang	Decision	3	3:00	China 57kg tournament quarterfinals
Kickboxing 57 kg	(China) Li Haiyang	def.	(China) Wang Hao	Decision	3	3:00	China 57kg tournament quarterfinals
Kickboxing 57 kg	(China) Zhao Zhengdong	def.	(China) Zhang Yuhao	Decision	3	3:00	China 57kg tournament quarterfinals
Kickboxing 67 kg	(China) Yi Yuxuan	def.	(China) Ren Yapeng	TKO (2 knockdowns)	1		China 67kg tournament quarterfinals
Kickboxing 67 kg	(China) Li Changbang	def.	(China) Zhang Xinbo	Decision	3	3:00	China 67kg tournament quarterfinals
Kickboxing 67 kg	(China) Zhang Kui	def.	(China) Wu Jiale	Decision	3	3:00	China 67kg tournament quarterfinals
Kickboxing 67 kg	(China) Er Kang	def.	(China) Wang Kaifeng	Decision	3	3:00	China 67kg tournament quarterfinals
Kickboxing 63 kg	(China) Yang Hua	def.	(China)	Decision	3	3:00	China 63kg tournament quarterfinals
Kickboxing 63 kg	(China) Zhang Jingtao	def.	(China) Pan Shiaowei	Decision	3	3:00	China 63kg tournament quarterfinals
Kickboxing 63 kg	(China) Zewa Liluo	def.	(China)	Decision	3	3:00	China 63kg tournament quarterfinals
Kickboxing 63 kg	(China) Wang Zunwei	def.	(China)	Decision	3	3:00	China 63kg tournament quarterfinals

== Wu Lin Feng 547 ==
Wu Lin Feng 547
- Promotion: Wu Lin Feng
- Date: August 31, 2024
- City: Tangshan, China

Wu Lin Feng 547 will be a multi discipline combat sports event held on August 31, 2024, in Tangshan, China.

=== Background ===
This event marks the debut of the qualifying tournaments for the year end MAX 70kg World Kickboxing Tournament.
The qualification take the form of 4-man tournaments separated in A, B, C and D groups each with two chinese athletes.

=== Results ===
Wu Lin Feng 547
Weight Class				Method	Round	Time	Notes
Boxing 126 lbs	(China) Chen Baomi	def.	(South Korea) Kyung Min Jin	Decision (Unanimous)	8	3:00	For the vacant WBC Asia Featherweight title
Kickboxing 65 kg	(Georgia (country)) Giorgi Malania	def.	(China) Han Tianxiang	Decision (Unanimous)	3	3:00	
Kickboxing 70 kg	(China) Han Wenbao	def.	(Thailand) Jomthong Chuwattana	Decision (Unanimous)	3	3:00	WLF MAX A Group Qualifying Tournament Final
Sanda 55 kg	(China) Li Yueyao	def.	(Iran) Sougand Salimi	Decision	3	3:00	
MMA Openweight	(Russia) Dmitry Vezhenko	def.	(China) Shalawati	Decision (unanimous)	3	5:00	
Muay Thai 63 kg	(China) Wei Weiyang	def.	(Thailand) Superman Banchamek	KO (Uppercut)	3		
Kickboxing 70 kg	(Thailand) Jomthong Chuwattana	vs.	(China) Meng Lingkuo	KO (Low kicks)	1		WLF MAX A Group Qualifying Tournament Semifinal
Kickboxing 70 kg	(China) Han Wenbao	def.	(Belarus) Dzianis Zuev	Decision	3	3:00	WLF MAX A Group Qualifying Tournament Semifinal

== Wu Lin Feng 548 ==
Wu Lin Feng 548
- Promotion: Wu Lin Feng
- Date: September 28, 2024
- City: Tangshan, China

Wu Lin Feng 548 will be a multi discipline combat sports event held on September 28, 2024, in Tangshan, China.

=== Results ===
Wu Lin Feng 548
Weight Class				Method	Round	Time	Notes
Kickboxing 63 kg	(China) Zhao Chongyang	def.	(China) Jin Ying	Decision (Unanimous)	3	3:00	WLF 63kg A Group Tournament Final
Kickboxing 64 kg	(Greece) Lani Alexandros	def.	(China) Zhang Jingtao	Decision	3	3:00	
Kickboxing 70 kg	(China) Qu Hao	def.	(Ukraine) Stanislav Kazantsev	Decision	3	3:00	WLF MAX Wildcard Fight
Kickboxing 70 kg	(Romania) Marian Lăpușneanu	def.	(Russia) Vasilii Semenov	KO (left hook)	3	2:55	WLF MAX B Group Qualifying Tournament Final
Muay Thai 61 kg	(China) Yang Ming	def.	(Thailand) Paesaisi	Decision	3	3:00	
Kickboxing 63 kg	(China) Zhao Chongyang	def.	(Spain) Daniel Puertas Gallardo	KO (Low kicks)	2	1:00	WLF 63kg A Group Tournament Semifinal
Kickboxing 63 kg	(China) Jin Ying	def.	(United Kingdom) Mo Abdurahman	Decision (Unanimous)	3	3:00	WLF 63kg A Group Tournament Semifinal
Kickboxing 70 kg	(Romania) Marian Lăpușneanu	def.	(China) Chen Yonghui	Decision (Unanimous)	3	3:00	WLF MAX B Group Qualifying Tournament Semifinal
Kickboxing 70 kg	(Russia) Vasilii Semenov	def.	(China) Huang Yuan Zhe	Decision	3	3:00	WLF MAX B Group Qualifying Tournament Semifinal

== Wu Lin Feng 549 ==
Wu Lin Feng 549
- Promotion: Wu Lin Feng
- Date: October 26, 2024
- City: Tangshan, China

Wu Lin Feng 549 will be a multi discipline combat sports event held on October 26, 2024, in Tangshan, China.

=== Background ===
This event features two 4-man qualifying tournaments in the 63kg and 70kg divisions. In the 70kg MAX tournament semifinals reigning Wu Lin Feng and K-1 champion Ouyang Feng faces Johannes Baas and reigning RCC Fair Fight champion Aleksei Ulianov faces Ji Longteng. In the 63kg semifinals former K-1 champion Kongnapa Weerasakreck faces Wei Weiyang while Zhang Lanpei faces Giorgi Malania.

=== Results ===
Wu Lin Feng 549
Weight Class				Method	Round	Time	Notes
Kickboxing 70 kg	(China) Ouyang Feng	def.	(Russia) Aleksei Ulianov	Decision (Unanimous)	3	3:00	WLF MAX C Group Qualifier Tournament final
Kickboxing 63 kg	(Georgia (country)) Giorgi Malania	def.	(China) Wei Weiyang	Decision (Unanimous)	3	3:00	WLF 63kg B Group Tournament final
Kickboxing 67.5 kg	(China) Yi Yuxuan	def.	(Russia) Alexander Michailuk	Decision (Split)	3	3:00	
MMA 66 kg	(China) Ahejiang Ailinuer	def.	(Russia) Gabriel Gabrielyan	Submission (rear naked choke)	1		
Kickboxing 68 kg	(China) Zhou Jiaqiang	def.	(Thailand) Jomthong Chuwattana	Decision (Unanimous)	3	3:00	
Kickboxing 70 kg	(Russia) Aleksei Ulianov	def.	(China) Ji Longteng	Decision (Unanimous)	3	3:00	WLF MAX C Group Qualifier Tournament Semifinal
Kickboxing 70 kg	(China) Ouyang Feng	def.	(Germany) Johannes Baas	Decision (Unanimous)	3	3:00	WLF MAX C Group Qualifier Tournament Semifinal
Kickboxing 63 kg	(China) Wei Weiyang	def.	(Thailand) Kongnapa Weerasakreck	Decision (Unanimous)	3	3:00	WLF 63kg B Group Tournament Semifinal
Kickboxing 63 kg	(Georgia (country)) Giorgi Malania	def.	(China) Zhang Lanpei	Decision (Unanimous)	3	3:00	WLF 63kg B Group Tournament Semifinal; Zhang was deducted 3 points for missing weight.

== Wu Lin Feng 550 ==
Wu Lin Feng 550
- Promotion: Wu Lin Feng
- Date: November 30, 2024
- City: Tangshan, China

Wu Lin Feng 550 will be a multi discipline combat sports event held on November 30, 2024, in Tangshan, China.

=== Results ===
Wu Lin Feng 550
Weight Class				Method	Round	Time	Notes
Kickboxing 70 kg	(China) Luo Chao	def.	(Iran) Masoud Minaei	TKO (Punches)	1		WLF MAX D Group Qualifier Tournament final
Kickboxing 63 kg	(Japan) Hirotaka Asahisa	def.	(China) Zhu Shuai	Decision (Unanimous)	3	3:00	WLF 63kg C Group Qualifier Tournament final
MMA 77 kg	(China) Taiyilake	vs.	(Uzbekistan) Dadahon Khasanov				
MMA 66 kg	(China) Zqiuduoji	def.	(Uzbekistan) Shakhzodbek Zhumanov	Decision	3	5:00	
MMA 68.5 kg	(Russia) Aleksandr Lunev	def.	(China) Daermisi Zhawupasi	TKO (Doctor stoppage)	2		
Kickboxing 70 kg	(Iran) Masoud Minaei	def.	(Germany) Pascal Schroth	Decision (Unanimous)	3	3:00	WLF MAX D Group Qualifier Tournament Semifinal
Kickboxing 70 kg	(China) Luo Chao	def.	(Russia) Jamal Yusupov	TKO (Low kicks)	3		WLF MAX D Group Qualifier Tournament Semifinal
Kickboxing 64 kg	(China) Wei Weiyang	def.	(Belgium) Salah Hitou	KO (Left hook)	2	2:32	
Kickboxing 63 kg	(China) Zhu Shuai	def.	(Thailand) Pinpetch Banchamek	Decision	3	3:00	WLF 63kg C Group Qualifier Tournament Semifinal
Kickboxing 63 kg	(Japan) Hirotaka Asahisa	def.	(China) Zhang Jingtao	Decision (Unanimous)	3	3:00	WLF 63kg C Group Qualifier Tournament Semifinal

== Wu Lin Feng Direct Digital Show 2 ==
Wu Lin Feng Direct Digital Show 2
- Promotion: Wu Lin Feng
- Date: December 11, 2024
- Venue: Henan Radio and Television Station
- City: Zhengzhou, China

Wu Lin Feng Direct Digital Show 2 was a multi discipline combat sport event held on December 11, 2024, in Zhengzhou, China.

The 57 kg tournament quarter-finals and 65 kg tournament reserve fight were televised on December 28, 2024.

The 57 kg tournament semi-finals and final, and the 75 kg reserve fight were televised on January 4, 2025. Wang Zhongxian won the 57 kg tournament.

=== Results ===
Wu Lin Feng
Weight Class				Method	Round	Time	Notes
Sanda 65 kg	(China)	vs.	(China)				WLF 65kg Sanda Tournament Final
Kickboxing 75 kg	(China)	vs.	(China)				WLF 75kg Tournament Final
Kickboxing 70 kg	(China)	vs.	(China)				WLF 70kg Tournament Final
Kickboxing 65 kg	(China)	vs.	(China)				WLF 65kg Tournament Final
Kickboxing 60 kg	(China)	vs.	(China)				WLF 60kg Tournament Final
Kickboxing 57 kg	(China)	vs.	(China)				WLF 57kg Tournament Final
Kickboxing 70 kg	(China)	vs.	(China)				WLF 70kg Tournament Semifinals
Kickboxing 70 kg	(China)	vs.	(China)				WLF 70kg Tournament Semifinals
Kickboxing 65 kg	(China)	vs.	(China)				WLF 65kg Tournament Semifinals
Kickboxing 65 kg	(China)	vs.	(China)				WLF 65kg Tournament Semifinals
Kickboxing 60 kg	(China)	vs.	(China)				WLF 60kg Tournament Semifinals
Kickboxing 60 kg	(China)	vs.	(China)				WLF 60kg Tournament Semifinals
Sanda 65 kg	(China) Li Chaopeng	vs.	(China) Han Cong				WLF 65kg Sanda Tournament Semifinals
Sanda 65 kg	(China) Wu Chengyue	vs.	(China) Wu Tienan				WLF 65kg Sanda Tournament Semifinals
Kickboxing 75 kg	(China) Tien Wenkang	vs.	(China) Choi Wai Ho				WLF 75kg Tournament Semifinals
Kickboxing 75 kg	(China) Nie Xuekang	vs.	(China) Qian Teng Yuan				WLF 75kg Tournament Semifinals
Kickboxing 70 kg	(China) Wang Jinbiao	vs.	(China) Zhou Haoran				WLF 70kg Tournament Quarterfinals
Kickboxing 70 kg	(China) Li Changbang	vs.	(China) Si Guanlin				WLF 70kg Tournament Quarterfinals
Kickboxing 70 kg	(China) Meng Lingkuo	vs.	(China) Xu Jiaao				WLF 70kg Tournament Quarterfinals
Kickboxing 70 kg	(China) Yang Zhen	vs.	(China) Yan Xuhao				WLF 70kg Tournament Quarterfinals
Kickboxing 65 kg	(China) Yu Jingkun	vs.	(China) Chen Xiaofan				WLF 65kg Tournament Quarterfinals
Kickboxing 65 kg	(China) Liu Zhengyu	vs.	(China) Liu Longquan				WLF 65kg Tournament Quarterfinals
Kickboxing 65 kg	(China) Wang Penghui	vs.	(China) Xu Kaikai				WLF 65kg Tournament Quarterfinals
Kickboxing 65 kg	(China) Zheng Zhaobin	vs.	(China) Yuan Wu				WLF 65kg Tournament Quarterfinals
Kickboxing 60 kg	(China) Jia Mengqiang	vs.	(China) Li He				WLF 60kg Tournament Quarterfinals
Kickboxing 60 kg	(China) Liu Yongyuan	vs.	(China) Hao Jilong				WLF 60kg Tournament Quarterfinals
Kickboxing 60 kg	(China) Ma Qiang	vs.	(China) Li Xiaolong				WLF 60kg Tournament Quarterfinals
Kickboxing 60 kg	(China) Huang Qirui	vs.	(China) Tong Kelei				WLF 60kg Tournament Quarterfinals
Kickboxing 75 kg	(China) Yue Shuai	def.	(China) Tian Weiyu	Decision (Unanimous)	3	3:00	WLF 75kg Tournament Reserve fight
Kickboxing 57 kg	(China) Wang Zhongxian	def.	(China) Sheng Yizhuo	Decision (Unanimous)	3	3:00	WLF 57kg Tournament Final
Kickboxing 57 kg	(China) Wang Zhongxian	def.	(China) Zhao Zhendong	Decision (Unanimous)	3	3:00	WLF 57kg Tournament Semi-finals
Kickboxing 57 kg	(China) Sheng Yizhuo	def.	(China) Zhang Shuo	Decision (Unanimous)	3	3:00	WLF 57kg Tournament Semi-finals
Kickboxing 65 kg	(China) Li Haoxuan	def.	(China) Chen Zhanfeng	Decision (Unanimous)	3	3:00	WLF 65kg Tournament Reserve fight
Kickboxing 57 kg	(China) Wang Zhongxian	def.	(China) Zhang Haiyang	Decision (Unanimous)	3	3:00	WLF 57kg Tournament Quarter-finals
Kickboxing 57 kg	(China) Zhao Zhendong	def.	(China) Wu Yutong	Decision (Unanimous)	3	3:00	WLF 57kg Tournament Quarter-finals
Kickboxing 57 kg	(China) Zhang Shuo	def.	(China) Xu Lei	Decision (Unanimous)	3	3:00	WLF 57kg Tournament Quarter-finals
Kickboxing 57 kg	(China) Sheng Yizhuo	def.	(China) Wang Ziqiao	KO (Right cross)	2	2:37	WLF 57kg Tournament Quarter-finals

== Wu Lin Feng 551 ==
Wu Lin Feng 551
- Promotion: Wu Lin Feng
- Date: December 21, 2024
- City: China

Wu Lin Feng 551 will be a multi discipline combat sports event held on December 28, 2024, in China.

=== Results ===
Wu Lin Feng 551
Weight Class				Method	Round	Time	Notes
Kickboxing 63 kg	(China) Shun Li	def.	(China) Ji Zhize	Decision	3	3:00	WLF 63kg D Group Qualifier Tournament final
MMA 63 kg	(China) Zhang Qinghe	vs.	(Tajikistan) Umidzhon Musaev				
Kickboxing 71.5 kg	(China) Chen Yonghui	def.	(Belarus) Pavel Hryshanovich	TKO (3 Knockdowns)	2		
Kickboxing 72 kg	(China) Han Feilong	def.	(Thailand) Petchmorakot Petchyindee Academy	Decision (Unanimous)	3	3:00	
Kickboxing 63 kg	(China) Yang Ming	def.	(Japan) Kanta Motoyama	TKO (3 Knockdowns)	1		
Kickboxing 63 kg	(China) Shun Li	def.	(Iran) Ali Zarinfar	Decision (Unanimous)	3	3:00	WLF 63kg D Group Qualifier Tournament Semifinal
Kickboxing 63 kg	(China) Ji Zhize	def.	(Thailand) Petchdam Petchyindee Academy	Decision (Unanimous)	3	3:00	WLF 63kg D Group Qualifier Tournament Semifinal
MMA 57 kg	(China) Mao Jie	vs.	(Russia) Ekaterina Makarova				
Kickboxing 67 kg	(Georgia (country)) Gabunia Vakthangi	def.	(China) Er Kang	Ext.R Decision	4	3:00	

== See also ==
- 2024 in Glory
- 2024 in K-1
- 2024 in RISE
- 2024 in ONE Championship
- 2024 in Romanian kickboxing
