= Lao Chantrea =

Cambodian martial artist

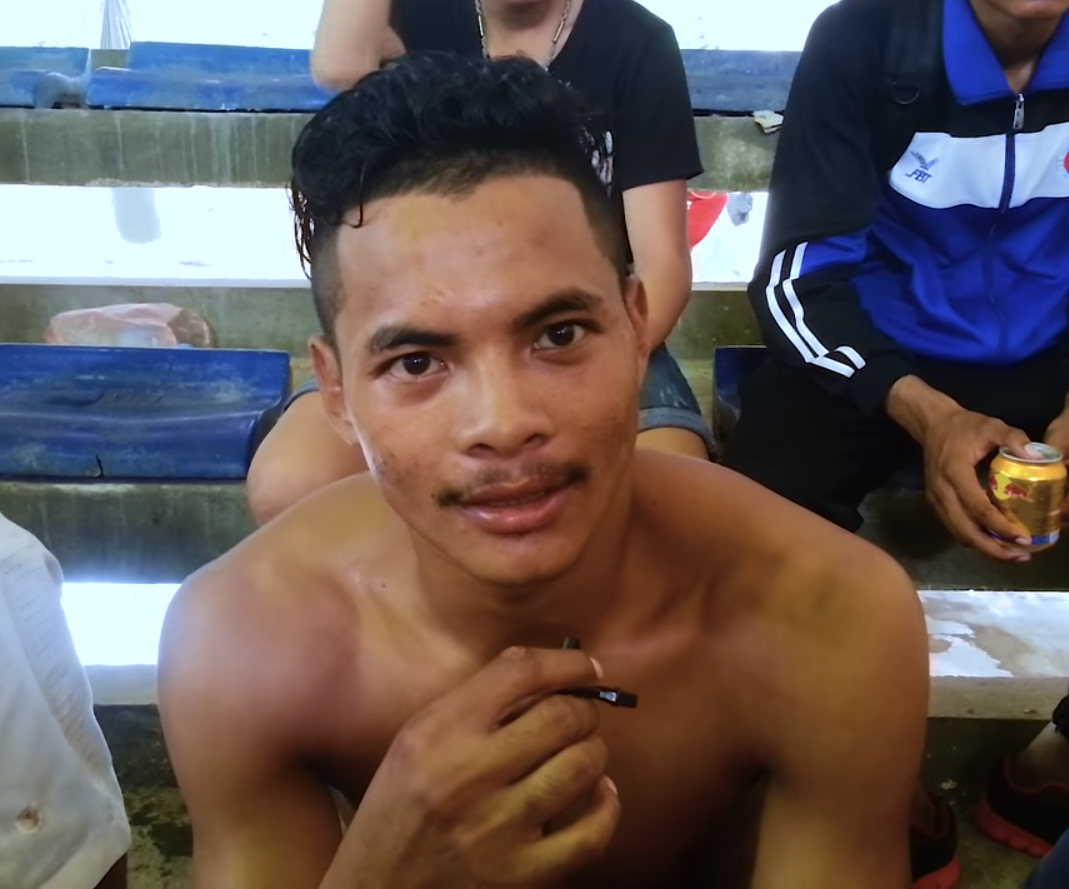
- Born: Lao Chantrea; September 17, 1993 (age 33); Cambodia
- Other names: Lao Chantra
- Fighting out of: Kampong Speu Province, Cambodia
- Team: 911 Parachute Special Forces

Kickboxing record
- Total: 112
- Wins: 100
- By knockout: 47
- Losses: 8
- Draws: 4

Other information
- Notable relatives: Lao Chetra (younger brother)

Lao Chantrea is a Cambodian martial artist that competes in the Cambodian sport of Kun Khmer (pradal serey). He is considered one of the most skilled boxers in Cambodia and a member of Cambodia's national Kun Khmer team. He has won the national championship and is the reigning gold medalist in Kun Khmer at the Southeast Asian Games in the 75 kg weight division.

== Boxing career ==
In 2014, a young Lao Chantrea won the 60 kg Leo Beer belt. In 2015, the Cambodian Boxing Federation bestowed upon Lao Chantrea the nickname, the "flying knee". Previously, the nickname was held by Eh Phouthong. Eh Phouthong said he was happy that a new strong athlete could use that nickname because he had retired from boxing.

On March 19, 2016, Lao Chantrea from the 911 Parachute Brigade Club became champion of the second season of the PNN Leo Beer Championship. He won $5,000 by knocking out Soth Bunthy by elbow to the neck in the second round. Lao Chantrea believed he had a 90% chance of winning the finals of the Leo Beer Belt. In December 2016, Lao Chantrea defeated Phal Sophorn at the Kubota Championship at Bayon Boeung Snor Arena. On December 30, 2017, Lao Chantrea beat his opponent Thananchai with a unanimous decision in a match at Bayon Arena.

In 2018, Sabay News named Lao Chantrea as one of the top 5 Cambodian boxers most technically skilled in ability. He is known for his punches, kicks and clinching while using knee techniques. In 2018 at the ISI PALM championship at CNC television studio, Lao Chantrea beat Chhan Chhai of Thailand with an elbow attack. The referee stopped the match and Chantrea won in round three of the five scheduled rounds. In 2018, Lao Chantrea was named to the 2018 national team.

At the 2019 national championship, Lao Chantrea earned a gold medal in the 67 kg weight division. On June 14, 2020, Lao Chantrea won against Thoeun Theara by points. Their next match was on July 31, 2021 and Lao Chantrea knocked out Thoeun Theara in the second round. On Saturday morning of June 26, 2021, at Bayon TV arena, Lao Chantrea got hit by the heavy hand of Thai Rithy and lost the match in the middle of the 3rd round.

Although he was selected for the national team, Lao Chantrea did not compete at the 31st SEA Games because his weight division was not an event. At the 32nd SEA Games, Lao Chantrea received a gold medal by defeating Vietnamese boxer Nguyen Hong Quan in the finals of the men's 75 kg weight division. The match took place on the afternoon of May 11, 2023 at Morodok Techo National Stadium.

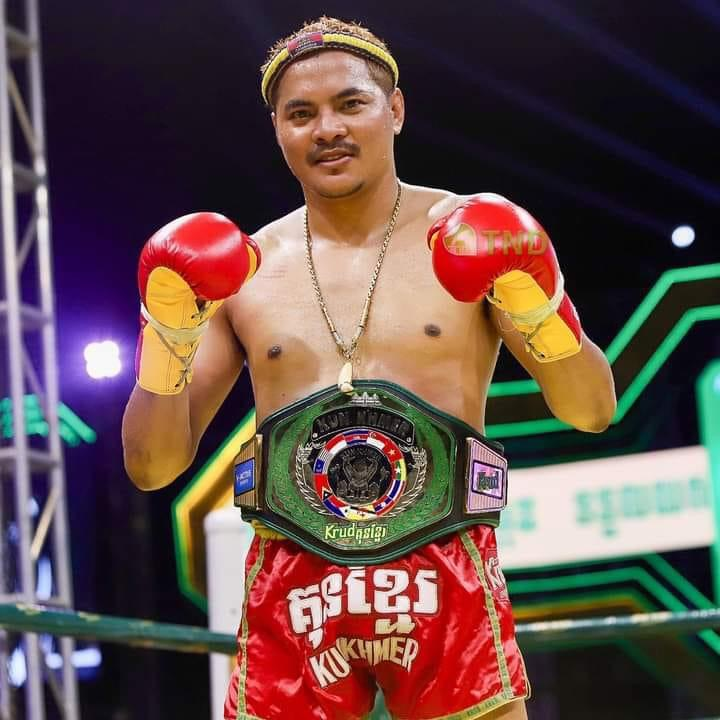
Lao Chantrea with championship belt

In 2023, Lao Chantrea won in the second round against Denpanum, the reigning Lumpinee middleweight champion from Thailand. On February 4, 2024, at The Battle of Kings event at the National Television of Cambodia(TVK), Lao Chantrea beat Sudsakorn Sor Klinmee by points.

Lao Chantrea was scheduled to compete for an upcoming title bout in the over-78 kg category against the seasoned Thai fighter Saiyok Pumpanmuang. This match, scheduled for February 23 in Takeo province, represents a significant opportunity for Chantrea to demonstrate his competencies and revitalize his standing in the sport.

Chantrea has acknowledged a decline in his performance in recent years, which is in stark contrast to his dominance as a fighter seven or eight years ago when he was regarded as a formidable opponent. During that peak period, he consistently achieved victories in high-profile contests, often securing wins through powerful knee strikes and proficient boxing techniques that led to knockouts of his competitors.

== Personal life ==
Lao Chantrea trains under Master Hong Seun who has also train other famous athletes such as Ung Virak, Lao Chetra, Lao Sinath and Prom Samnang. He is the older brother of Kun Khmer star, Lao Chetra. His nephew is Cambodian boxer Lao Sainet, who is a boxer at the 911 Parachute Brigade Club.

Lao Chantrea was in attendance at Manny Pacquiao's state visit to Cambodia and was among the Cambodian boxers to take a selfie with the Filipino great.

Lao Chantrea has said he wanted to see a lot of fans and sponsors support Cambodian boxers in the same way they do soccer. He has said the Cambodian boxing industry does not receive enough support.

== Championships and accomplishments ==
Medal record

Men's Kun Khmer

Representing Cambodia

Southeast Asian Games
| Gold medal – first place | 2023 Phnom Penh | Men's 75 kg |

- 2014 Leo Beer Belt (60 kg)
- 2016 PNN Leo Beer Champion
- 2016 Kubota Champion
- 2018 ISI PALM Champion
- 2019 National Championship Gold Medalist (67 kg)
- 2023 Southeast Asian Games Gold Medalist (75 kg)
- 2025 Krud Kun Khmer Champion (78 kg)

== Fight record ==
Professional Fight record
| Date | Result | Opponent | Event | Location | Method | Round | Time |
|---|---|---|---|---|---|---|---|
| July 5, 2026 | Win | (France) Sofiane Yousseef | Bayon TV | Phnom Penh, Cambodia | Decision | 3 | |
| May 2, 2026 | Loss | (China) Li Bolin | Town Boxing | Cambodia | KO | 2 | 2:14 |
| March 22, 2026 | Win | (Iran) Ameer Yousefi | PNN Sports | Cambodia | KO | 4 | 1:24 |
| March 14, 2026 | Win | (Iran) Moham Madreza | Kun Khmer on Bayon TV | Phnom Penh, Cambodia | KO | 2 | 0:17 |
| January 18, 2026 | Win | (Iran) Ahad Varghaiyan | Bayon TV | Phnom Penh, Cambodia | Decision | 3 | |
| November 23, 2025 | Win | (Morocco) Mohamed Attaba | PNN Sports | Phnom Penh, Cambodia | TKO | 4 | 0:29 |
| September 13, 2025 | Loss | (United States) Juan Jackson | Krud Kun Khmer: Land of Peace | Cambodia | TKO(doctor's stoppage) | 2 | |
| June 21, 2025 | Loss | (New Zealand) Suran Juanmiry | Bayon TV News | New Zealand | KO | 1 | 1:19 |
| May 31, 2025 | Win | (United States) Juan Jackson | Krud Kun Khmer to USA - Bayon Television | Tacoma, U.S. | Decision | 3 | |
| February 23, 2025 | Win | (Thailand) Saiyok Pumpanmuang | Krud Kun Khmer | Cambodia | Decision | 3 | |
| December 30, 2024 | Loss | (Australia) Jake Lund | Krud Kun Khmer | Cambodia | TKO | 2 | |
| June 29, 2024 | Win | (Iran) Mortasa Seyfifarrd | Hang Meas Kun Khmer | Cambodia | Decision | 3 | |
| June 15, 2024 | Win | (Thailand) Sudsakorn Sor Klinmee | Krud Kun Khmer: The Battle of Kings | Cambodia | Decision | 3 | |
| February 4, 2024 | Win | (Thailand) Sudsakorn Sor Klinmee | Krud Kun Khmer TVK | Phnom Penh, Cambodia | Decision | 3 | |
| January 13, 2024 | Win | (Laos) Sytheun Silabouth | Cambodia Beer Boxing | Phnom Penh, Cambodia | Decision | 3 | |
| December 10, 2023 | Win | (Thailand) Denpanom Pran26 | Ganzberg Kun Khmer | Phnom Penh, Cambodia | TKO(doctor's stoppage) | 2 | |
| October 8, 2023 | Win | (Laos) Nakhornkraisorn | PNN Boxing | Phnom Penh, Cambodia | TKO | 3 | 1:00 |
| August 27, 2023 | Win | (Iran) Masoud Moghimian | PNN Sports | Phnom Penh, Cambodia | TKO | 3 | |
| March 11, 2023 | Win | (Iran) Hassan Vahdani | PNN Boxing | Phnom Penh, Cambodia | TKO(doctor's stoppage) | 4 | 0:06 |
| April 23, 2022 | Loss | (Brazil) Thiago Teixeira | Town Boxing | Phnom Penh, Cambodia | Decision | 3 | |
| April 10, 2022 | Loss | (China) Luo Chao | Wu Lin Feng 2022: WLF in Cambodia | Angkor, Cambodia | KO (Body punches) | 1 | 1:08 |
| July 31, 2021 | Win | (Cambodia) Thoeun Theara | CNC Boxing | Phnom Penh, Cambodia | KO | 2 | 0:18 |
| June 20, 2020 | Win | (Cambodia) Long Sophy | CTN Boxing | Phnom Penh, Cambodia | Decision | 5 | |
| June 14, 2020 | Win | (Cambodia) Thoeun Theara | CNC Boxing | Phnom Penh, Cambodia | Decision | 5 | |
| March 1, 2020 | Draw | (Belarus) Pavel Grishanovich | Mas Fight Cambodia | Phnom Penh, Cambodia | Decision | 1 | |
| November 4, 2018 | Win | (Thailand) Phusarngyai | Bayon TV boxing | Phnom Penh, Cambodia | KO | 1 | 0:28 |
| June 17, 2018 | Win | (France) Kassem Yanis | Rahu Fight II | France | Decision | 3 | |
| May 6, 2018 | Win | (Cambodia) Puch Chhairithy | CNC Boxing | Phnom Penh, Cambodia | Decision | 5 | |
| February 11, 2018 | Win | (Laos) Chhanchhai | CNC Boxing | Phnom Penh, Cambodia | TKO | 3 | 1:50 |
| December 30, 2017 | Win | (Thailand) Thananchai Sitsongpeenong | Bayon TV | Phnom Penh, Cambodia | Decision | 5 | |
| June 25, 2017 | Win | (Laos) Namphon | Bayon TV | Phnom Penh, Cambodia | TKO | 3 | |
| June 10, 2017 | Draw | (Thailand) Maishot | CNC Boxing | Phnom Penh, Cambodia | Decision | 5 | |
| December 25, 2016 | Win | (Cambodia) Phal Sophorn | Kubota Championship-Bayon TV | Phnom Penh, Cambodia | Decision | 5 | |
| November 2, 2016 | Win | (Cambodia) Phal Sophorn | The Nationals | Phnom Penh, Cambodia | Decision | 5 | |
| September 4, 2016 | Win | (Cambodia) Phal Sophorn | Bayon TV | Phnom Penh, Cambodia | TKO | 3 | 1:58 |
| March 19, 2016 | Win | (Cambodia) Soth Bunthy | PNN Championship | Phnom Penh, Cambodia | KO | 2 | 0:53 |
| January 16, 2016 | Win | (Thailand) Sam A | PNN Boxing | Phnom Penh, Cambodia | Decision | 5 | |
