= Thun Sophea =

Cambodian kickboxer (born 1979)

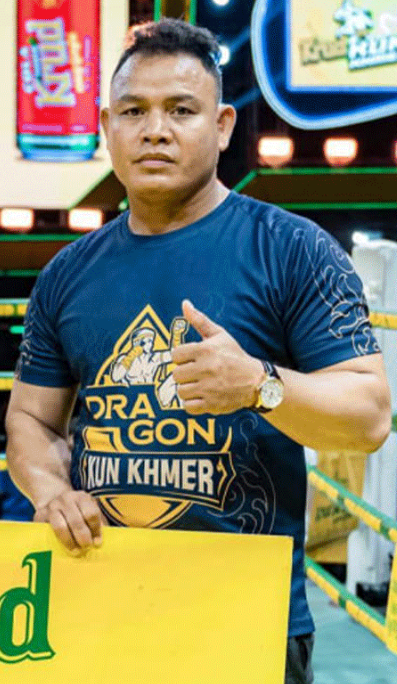
- Born: 1979 (age 46–47); People's Republic of Kampuchea
- Native name: ធន់ សុភា
- Nationality: (Cambodia) Cambodian
- Height: 1.70 m (5 ft 7 in)
- Weight: 67 kg (148 lb; 10.6 st)
- Style: Pradal Serey
- Stance: Orthodox
- Fighting out of: Svay Rieng, Cambodia
- Team: Ministry of National Defence, Cambodia
- Trainer: Chiit Sarim
- Years active: 1998–2012

Kickboxing record
- Total: 93
- Wins: 80
- By knockout: N/A
- Losses: 8
- Draws: 5
- Last updated on: February 27, 2023

Thun Sophea (born 1979) is a retired professional kickboxer from Svay Rieng, Cambodia. He is the 2006 Cambodian Television Network Traditional Khmer Kickboxing champion. Thun Sophea trained at the Ministry of Defense Boxing Association under Chhit Sarim, who also trained Cambodian champion Eh Phouthong at the Ministry of Defense Boxing Club. Thun Sophea was once considered Cambodia's best kickboxer. He had defeated every notable Cambodian fighter including Sen Bunthen, Vorn Viva, Meas Chantha, Chey Kosal and Outh Phouthang.

In 2000, Thun Sophea defeated Nuon Sorya to win the TV3 belt. In 2002, Thun Sophea defeated Chey Kosal to win the TV5 belt. In 2006, Thun Sophea defeated Meas Chantha to win the CTN belt.

In 2007, Thun Sophea was ranked number 1 in the 65 kg weight division above Meas Chantha who was second and Pao Puot who was ranked third.

In July 2009, Thun Sophea defeated Sen Bunthen at the CTN boxing arena.

In October 2009, Thun Sophea defeated Ugandan boxer Muhammed Nsugbuga in a first-round TKO by low kicks.

In January 2010, Thun Sophea defeated veteran fighter Vouey Sothun at TV5 Boxing arena by decision. Thun Sophea was victorious over Vouey Sothun in two previous matches.

In February 2010, Thun Sophea defeated English fighter Jason Woodham by low kicks in the third round.

In March 2010, Thun Sophea defeated French boxer Adil Khodja at TV3 arena.

On September 10, 2010, Sen Bunthen won by decision against Thun Sophea.

In November 2010, Thun Sophea had a rare decision loss to South African fighter Bakhulule Baai.

In 2011, Thun was the highest paid athlete (along with Chhunly Pagenburg) from Cambodia making US$30,000.

Thun Sophea is now a referee for pradal serey matches. He is also now the head coach of the Ministry of National Defense boxing team. His top students at the Ministry of National Defense boxing team include Lorn Panha, Bun Sothea, Thun Phanith and Thun Rithy.

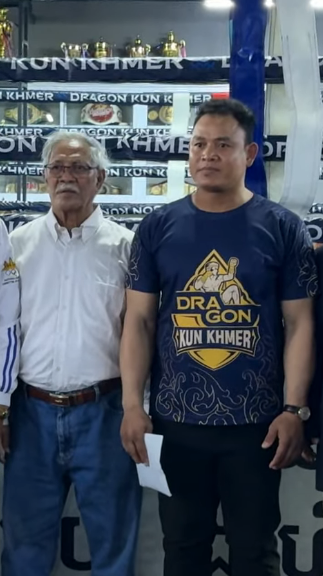
Thun Sophea with his coach, Chhit Sarim

== Coaching ==
Thun Sophea is the current coach of the Ministry of National Defense gym. He trains 50 students every day. He has a goal to train 100 students in Khmer martial arts.

In December 2019, his student at the Ministry of National Defense, Bun Sothea, defeated strong fighter Sok Thy of Banteay Meanchey by decision. Bun Sothea was able to score two knockdowns in the fourth round. Sok Thy was a 2018 National Kun Khmer champion and a champion at Bayon and PNN stadium.

In a 2025 interview, Thun Sophea stated that none of his students could succeed him in martial arts. He stated most of his students used force, didn't use tactics in fighting and didn't know how to stop their opponents' weapons. Thun Sophea stated that if a fighter knows how to withstand and restrain an opponent's attack, then it would be difficult for the opponent to fight.

== Championships and accomplishments ==
Pradal Serey

- 2000 TV3 Championship
- 2002 TV5 Championship
- 2006 CTN Championship

== See also ==
- Pradal Serey
- Kickboxing
