= Lorn Panha =

Cambodian Kun Khmer fighter (born 1999)

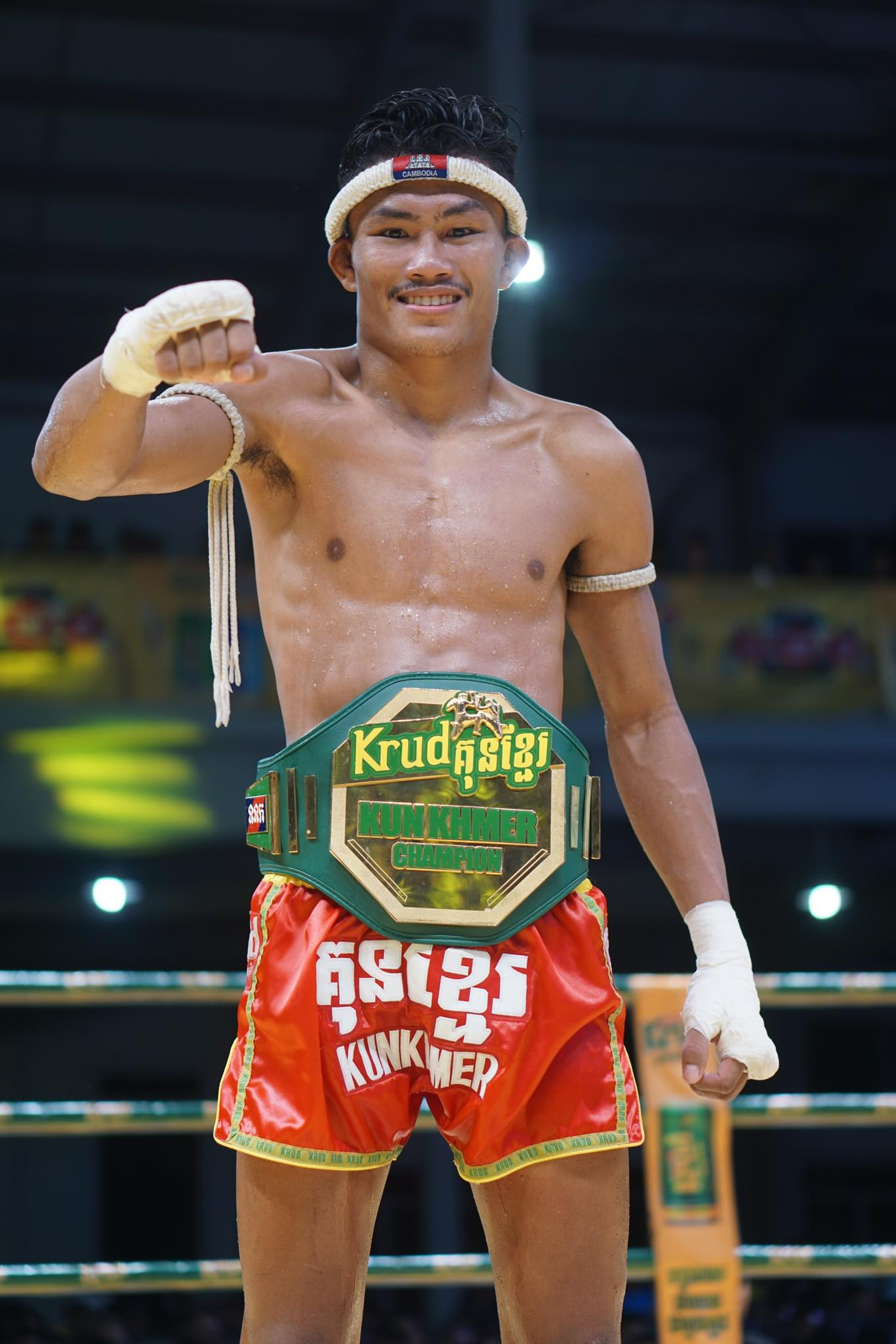
- Born: 4 June 1999 (age 27); Svay Antor, Prey Veng, Cambodia
- Native name: លន បញ្ញា
- Height: 1.79 m (5 ft 10 1/2 in)
- Weight: 67 kg (148 lb; 10.6 st)
- Style: Kun Khmer kickboxing
- Team: Thun Sophea Kun Khmer Gym; Ministry of National Defence, Cambodia
- Trainer: Thun Sophea
- Years active: 2017–present

Kickboxing record
- Total: 127
- Wins: 103
- By knockout: 50
- Losses: 19
- Draws: 5

Lorn Panha (Khmer: លន បញ្ញា; born 4 June 1999) is a Cambodian professional Kun Khmer fighter and kickboxer. He is a member of Cambodia's national kickboxing team. He has garnered recognition both domestically and internationally. The Kampuchea Thmey Daily previously listed him as a top 10 Kun Khmer boxer in early 2023. The Kampuchea Thmey Daily listed him as a top 10 Kun Khmer boxer for 2024. In 2025, The Kampuchea Thmey Daily considered Lorn Panha as the number one Kun Khmer boxer at 67 kg after the decline of Lao Chetra. Lorn Panha is a technical fighter. He is known for having good technique, endurance and strength. Panha is praised by fans for being able to fight well in every aspect including elbows, punches, kicks, knees and full body strength.

== Early life ==
Lorn Panha was born in Krachap village, Prey Khla commune, Svay Antor district, Prey Veng province, Cambodia. In 2013, Panha quit school at eighth-grade education as his family faced economic hardships. He moved to Thailand, where he worked for a year. Following his return to Cambodia, he pursued carpentry as a means of livelihood, dedicating nearly two years of his life to this craft, from 2014 until the end of 2016.

== Martial arts career ==
In 2017, Lorn Panha decided to pursue a career in Khmer boxing. He became a member of the Boxing Association of the Ministry of National Defense and embarked on rigorous training under the guidance of Thun Sophea, who received his training at the Ministry of Defense Boxing Association under Chhit Sarim.

Medal record

Men's Kickboxing

Representing Cambodia

Southeast Asian Games
Silver medal – second place	2021 Hanoi	Men's 67 kg, Full Contact
Gold medal – first place	2023 Phnom Penh	Men's 67 kg, Full Contact

Lorn Panha is a prominent figure in the realm of Khmer boxing, having participated in approximately 100 matches and recording around 10 losses by 2023. His notable achievements included securing four championship belts and winning a national gold medal in the Men's Full Contact -67 kg category at the 2023 SEA Games. Additionally, Panha earned a silver medal during the SEA Games held in Vietnam. In honor of his significant contributions to the sport, he has been appointed as an official within the Ministry of National Defense.

On 10 October 2020, Lorn Panha defeated Soth Kevin for the Cambodia Beer Championship in the 63.5 kg weight division. The first-place winner received a prize of 24 million riels($6,000) while second-place winner, Soth Kevin, won 12 million riels.

At SEA Games 31, Lorn Panha beat Ophat Rodnok from Thailand 2–1 in the semi finals. In the finals, Lorn Panha lost to Vietnam's Nguyen The Huong at the 67 kg full contact division in kickboxing. Lorn Panha won the silver medal.

Lorn Panha made Kampuchea Thmey Daily's top 10 list of Khmer boxers who had the best first half of 2023. He has not lost in the last few months. In the 2023 SEA Games, he won a gold medal. On the afternoon of 16 May 2023, Lorn Panha defeated Haris Sofyan Abdul of Indonesia for the kickboxing gold medal in the 67 kg weight division.

On 3 August 2023, Lorn Panha beat Ncedo Gomba in the third round. He won the 65 kg international Krud Kun Khmer martial art title. Ncedo Gomba is a South Africa powerhouse with a record of 55 wins and 5 losses. Lorn Panha now has four belts and a gold and silver medal from the SEA games.

Lorn Panha competed with Lao Chetra for the Krud Kun Khmer belt. After five rounds, Panha lost to Lao Chetra. His three-year unbeaten streak in Kun Khmer ended and he was awarded 20 million riel.

Lorn Panha competed against Long Samnang for the Ganzberg Beer belt by PNN. Panha took three rounds to defeat Long Samnang and became the new owner of the Ganzberg Beer belt. He won a prize money of 16 million riel.

Lorn Panha fought against the strong fighter of Thailand and former fighter of the year of Thailand, Lamnamoonlek Tded99. Lorn Panha defeated him and won the title and prize money of 20 million riel. There was a reaction from some boxing fans that Lorn Panha did not deserve the win while other boxing fans said Lorn Panha really did deserve the win. His past three matches were title matches where he lost one and won two title matches.

The Kampuchea Thmey Daily listed him as a top 10 Kun Khmer boxer for 2024. His accomplishments for 2024 included fighting about 15 times in 2024 and only losing twice. He won a belt by defeating compatritot Long Samnang. He scored a draw with French star Anthony Defretin. Panha also won a gold medal at the 2024 National Games.

At a grand event of Krud Kun Khmer in Kampong Cham province, Lorn Panha defeated Thai athlete Sorgraw Petchyindee Academy in the third round.

Lorn Panha is scheduled to compete in New Zealand on 21 June 2025.

Panha was scheduled to compete for the WKN World Kun Khmer championship by competing against Moroccan Zakaria Rouigate on 11 January 2026. As the number 1 ranked Kun Khmer fighter in the 65–67 kg weight division, Panha has not faced defeat in recent times. Kun Khmer fighter Lorn Panha won the WKN World Kun Khmer Championship and became the first Cambodian to do so. He defeated Zakaria Rouigate by scoring a left foot kick to the face which resulted in significant pain to the mouth. The referee counted to 10 and his opponent could not continue. The event was the first collaboration between the World Kickboxing Network and the Khmer Boxing Federation.

Lorn Panha competed with Shamo Eyvasov of Spain for the ISKA World Welterweight Kun Khmer title (67 kg). It was an open air event with over 10,000 spectators. Panha scored a heavy head kick while Eyvasov complained that the back of his head was hit. The referee began the count and Eyvasov's corner had the towel thrown in. This gave Lorn Panha a TKO victory for the ISKA World Welterweight Kun Khmer title.

== Martial arts lineage ==
Achar Chhit Sarim -- > Kru Thun Sophea -- > Lorn Panha

== Titles and accomplishments ==
- World Kickboxing Network
  - 2026 WKN Kun Khmer World Welterweight Champion
- International Sport Kickboxing Association
  - 2026 ISKA Kun Khmer World Welterweight Champion
- Krud Kun Khmer
  - 2023 Krud Kun Khmer -65 kg Champion

== Kickboxing record ==
Professional Kickboxing record
2 wins (0 TKOs), 1 loss, 0 draws
Date	Result	Opponent	Event	Location	Method	Round	Time
2026-12-29		(Australia) Zack Pankhurst	K-1 World MAX 2026 - World Championship Tournament Final, Quarterfinals	Yokohama, Japan			
2026-09-12	Win	(Japan) Kazuki Matsumoto	K-1 World MAX 2026 - World Tournament Opening Round	Tokyo, Japan	Decision (majority)	3	3:00
Qualifies for the 2026 K-1 World MAX World Championship Tournament Final.
3 February 2023	Loss	(China) Yang Zhen	Wu Lin Feng	China	Decision	3	3:00
10 April 2022	Win	(China) Shang Xifeng	Wu Lin Feng 2022: WLF in Cambodia	Siem Reap, Cambodia	Decision	3	3:00
Legend: Win Loss Draw/no contest Notes

== Kun Khmer record ==
Professional Kun Khmer record
105 wins (53 (T)KOs), 18 losses, 5 draws
Date	Result	Opponent	Event	Location	Method	Round	Time
8 November 2026	Win	(South Africa) Mphumelelo Dube	DAZZ Kun Khmer	Cambodia	KO (Knee to the body)	3	0:35
22 August 2026	Win	(Russia) Tamerlan Bashirov	Xtreme Cambodia Kun Khmer	Cambodia	TKO (injury)	2	
8 August 2026	Win	(Iran) Amir Vahabnia	Kun Khmer on Bayon TV	Cambodia	Decision	3	3:00
12 July 2026	Win	(South Africa) Mphumelelo Dube	Krud Kun Khmer	Cambodia	Decision	3	3:00
20 June 2026	Win	(France) Dany Nijba	Kun Khmer Super Fight	Oyonnax, France	KO (High kick)	3	
Defends the KSF Welterweight title.
23 May 2026	Win	(Tunisia) Anes Yahya	Cambodia Energy - Amazing Kun Khmer	Cambodia	TKO (Knees)	1	
10 May 2026	Win	(Morocco) Tissir El Mahdi	Krud Kun Khmer	Cambodia	TKO (Referee stoppage)	3	
31 January 2026	Win	(Spain) Shamo Eyvasov	ISKA x Krud Kun Khmer	Phnom Penh, Cambodia	TKO (Corner stoppage)	3	
Wins the inaugural ISKA Kun Khmer World Welterweight title.
11 January 2026	Win	(Morocco) Zakaria Ruigate	WKN x Krud Kun Khmer	Sa Kaeo province, Cambodia	TKO (Front kick)	1	1:10
Wins the inaugural WKN Kun Khmer World Welterweight title.
22 November 2025	Win	(Australia) Alex Petroulias	Hang Meas Kun Khmer	Phnom Penh, Cambodia	Decision	5	
1 November 2025	Win	(Morocco) Taufig Chabibi	Hang Meas Kun Khmer	Phnom Penh, Cambodia	KO	2	0:00
18 October 2025	Win	(Iran) Mani Zolghadr	Bayon Television	Phnom Penh, Cambodia	Decision	3	
25 September 2025	Win	(Uganda) Award Kazimba	Cambodia Energy - Amazing Kun Khmer	Cambodia	Decision	3	3:00
21 June 2025	Win	(New Zealand) Daniel Ruwanga	Bayon Television	New Zealand	Decision	5	
31 May 2025	Win	(United States) Jose Aquino	Krud Kun Khmer to USA-Bayon Television	Tacoma, United States of America	Decision	5	
Wins the USECA International 67Kg title.
3 May 2025	Win	(Azerbaijan) Amin Guliyev	Xtreme Cambodia Kun Khmer	Cambodia	Decision	3	3:00
15 April 2025	Win	(Thailand) Sorgraw Petchyindee Academy	Krud Kun Khmer	Cambodia	KO (Left hook to the body)	3	1:42
18 January 2025	Win	(Iran) Reza Venum Muay Thai	Krud Kun Khmer	Cambodia	TKO (knees)	2	0:30
4 January 2025	Win	(China) Lu Jiawen	Hang Meas Kun Khmer	Phnom Penh, Cambodia	KO	1	
7 December 2024	Win	(China) Liu Shenghao	XTREME Cambodia Kun Khmer	Phnom Penh, Cambodia	TKO	2	2:45
9 November 2024	Draw	(France) Anthony Defretin	Bayon TV boxing	Phnom Penh, Cambodia	Decision	3	
20 October 2024	Win	(Thailand) Jaruadsuk	PNN Sports	Phnom Penh, Cambodia	Decision	5	
17 August 2024	Win	(Morocco) Mohamed Taoufiq	Hang Meas Kun Khmer	Cambodia	TKO	3	1:00
4 August 2024	Win	(Turkey) Cindir Semih Sah	Ganzberg Kun Khmer	Cambodia	Decision	3	
28 July 2024	Win	(Thailand) Jaruadsuk	Krud Kun Khmer	Phnom Penh, Cambodia	Decision	5	
27 June 2024	Loss	(France) Elias Naji	Kun Khmer Super Fight 3: Paris	Paris, France	Decision	3	3:00
2 June 2024	Win	(France) Omar Bathily	Kun Khmer Super Fight 2: Bordeaux	Bordeaux, France	Decision	3	3:00
12 May 2024	Win	(Thailand) Lamnamoonlek Tded99	King Krud Kun Khmer Championship TVK arena	Banlung, Rattanakiri, Cambodia	Decision (Split)	5	3:00
28 April 2024	Win	(Cambodia) Long Samnang	Ganzberg Kun Khmer Super Strike Championship PNN arena	Phnom Penh, Cambodia	TKO Stoppage	03	1:25
31 March 2024	Loss	(Cambodia) Lao Chetra	Krud Championship	Phnom Penh, Cambodia	Decision	5	
1 March 2024	Win	(France) Omar Bathily	Idol Kun Khmer BTV Arena	Phnom Penh, Cambodia	Decision	3	3:00
18 February 2024	Win	(Thailand) Paruehatnoi TBM Gym	Krud Kun Khmer TVK Arena	Stung Treng, Cambodia	Decision	5	3:00
4 February 2024	Win	(Turkey) Kenan Pendik	Krud Kun Khmer	Cambodia	Decision (Split)	5	3:00
19 January 2024	Win	(Iran) Amirhossein Darmiani	Bayon TV boxing	Phnom Penh, Cambodia	TKO	4	1:08
7 January 2024	Win	(Brazil) Victor Hugo Nunes	Ganzberg Idol Kun Khmer	Phnom Penh, Cambodia	Decision	3	
16 December 2023	Win	(Cambodia) Moeun Sokhuch	Bayon TV Boxing	Phnom Penh, Cambodia	TKO	2	
14 December 2023	Win	(Thailand) Sipsongpana Kiatwinai	Bayon TV Boxing	Phnom Penh, Cambodia	KO	2	0:10
28 November 2023	Win	(Thailand) Fa Moeung Sak Samai	Krud Kun Khmer	Phnom Penh, Cambodia	Decision	3	
7 September 2023	Win	(Iran) Ahmadi Faryad	Ganzberg One Strike	Phnom Penh, Cambodia	KO	2	00:23
3 September 2023	Win	(South Africa) Ncedo Gomba	Krud Kun Khmer	Phnom Penh, Cambodia	KO (Body kick)	3	1:31
Wins the Krud Kun Khmer 65kg title.
20 August 2023	Win	(Thailand) Nuengtrakarn Kor Kamonwath	Madrid Kun Khmer	Phnom Penh, Cambodia	Decision	5	
7 August 2023	Win	(Thailand) Far Dachai	Krud Kun Khmer	Phnom Penh, Cambodia	KO	1	00:45
31 July 2023	Win	(Thailand) Fanimit Viryakfarm	Carabao Kun Khmer	Phnom Penh, Cambodia	KO	1	01:03
2 July 2023	Win	(Thailand) Funluong	Krud Kun Khmer	Phnom Penh, Cambodia	Decision	5	
18 February 2023	Win	(Thailand) Rungnapha Pinsinchai	Carabao Kun Khmer	Phnom Penh, Cambodia	KO	1	0:24
28 December 2022	Win	(Philippines) Shaqile Soriano	Krud Kun Khmer	Phnom Penh, Cambodia	TKO	1	1:24
18 September 2022	Win	(Thailand) Phanrith EagleMuaythai	Masfight	Phnom Penh, Cambodia	Decision	3	3:00
28 May 2021	Draw	(Cambodia) Yen Dina	Bayon TV boxing	Phnom Penh, Cambodia	Decision	5	
13 Mar 2021	Win	(Cambodia) Phal Sophorn	Wurkz Kun Khmer	Phnom Penh, Cambodia	KO	3	00:41
24 January 2021	Win	(Cambodia) Soun Channy	PNN Boxing	Phnom Penh, Cambodia	Decision	5	
31 October 2020	Loss	(Cambodia) Yen Dina	CTN Boxing	Phnom Penh, Cambodia	Decision	5	
10 October 2020	Win	(Cambodia) Soth Kevin	CTN Boxing	Phnom Penh, Cambodia	Decision	5	
30 August 2020	Loss	(Cambodia) Moeun Sokhuch	CNC Boxing	Phnom Penh, Cambodia	Decision	5	
28 June 2020	Loss	(Cambodia) Phal Sophorn	Bayon TV Boxing	Phnom Penh, Cambodia	Decision	5	
7 June 2020	Win	(Cambodia) Rin Saroth	PNN Boxing	Phnom Penh, Cambodia	Decision	3	
13 October 2019	Loss	(Cambodia) Lao Chetra	Kun Khmer ISI Champion	Phnom Penh, Cambodia	KO	2	02:07
31 March 2019	Win	(Thailand) Gingsanglek Tor.Laksong	Wurkz Boxing	Phnom Penh, Cambodia	Decision	5	
15 September 2018	Win	(Cambodia) Meun Mekha	TV5 Boxing	Phnom Penh, Cambodia	Decision	3	

== Muay Thai record ==
Professional Muay Thai record
1 wins (0 TKOs), 0 loss, 0 draws
Date	Result	Opponent	Event	Location	Method	Round	Time
3 January 2022	Win	(Thailand) Buadin Banchamek	MAS Fight Bangkok	Bangkok, Thailand	TKO	1	6:24
Legend: Win Loss Draw/no contest Notes

== See also ==
- Pradal Serey
- Kickboxing
