= Lao Chetra =

Cambodian Kun Khmer fighter

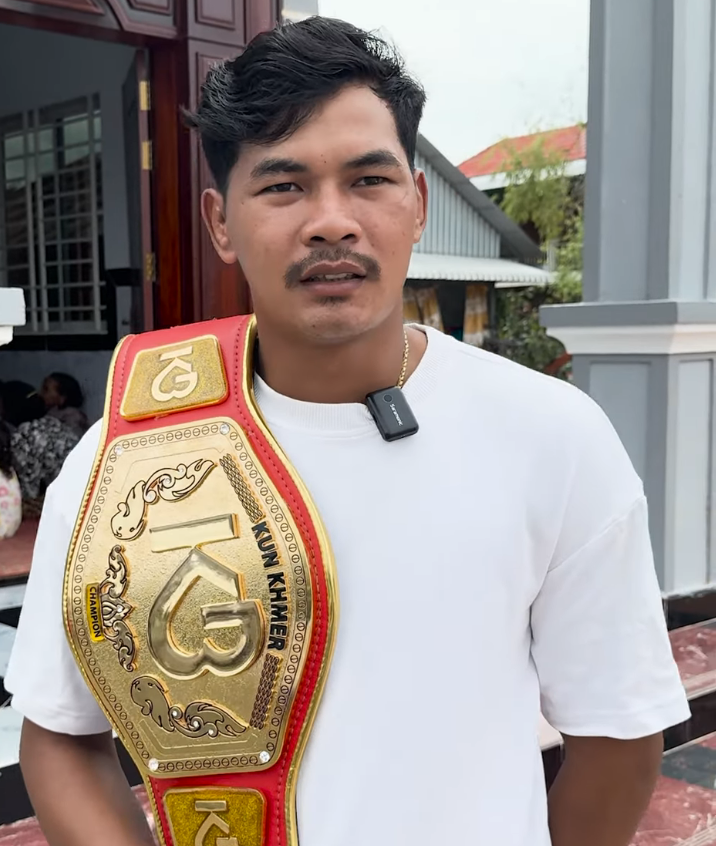
- Lao Chetra
- Born: 11 May 1999 (age 27)
- Other names: Lao Chitra
- Nickname: Super Soldier
- Height: 175 cm (5 ft 9 in)
- Division: 67 kg (148 lb; 10.6 st)
- Style: pradal serey
- Fighting out of: Kompong Speu, Cambodia
- Team: 911 Parachute Club

Kickboxing record
- Total: 146
- Wins: 120
- Losses: 21
- Draws: 5

Other information
- Notable relatives: Lao Sinath (older brother); Lao Chantrea (older brother)

Lao Chetra is a Cambodian Kun Khmer fighter. He is a member of Cambodia's national Kun Khmer team. He is widely considered as one of Cambodia's most prominent practitioners of Kun Khmer. He is the reigning gold medalist in Kun Khmer at the Southeast Asian Games in the 67 kg weight division.

== Early life ==
When he was young, Lao Chetra went to school in Kompong Speu province. He longed to compete in the ring. He became more fascinated when his brother Sinat started competing. In his seventh bout, he suffered a severe knockout loss and got eleven stitches. His mother and sister told his to stop fighting but he continued. He got the fullest support from older brothers Sinat and Chantrea. Eventually, his sister and mother started supporting his passion.

== Fighting career ==
On August 21, 2016, at the Southeast Asian Television Arena, rookie Lao Chetra fought Thai Khun Lek, a good fighter in the 54 kg weight division. In the third round, Lao Chetra knock down the Thai fighter to a count of 10. An organizer planned to have Lao Chetra compete against more Thai athletes in the future.

Lao Chetra became famous in 2016. He quickly became famous for his bravery, good fighting skills and good physique. In 2016, Lao Chetra won a gold medal at the first national sports event. At the Malaysian SEA Games, Lao Chetra won a bronze medal which made him more famous. At 18 years old, Chetra made headlines by beating a Russian fighter by points at a Khmer-Thai Fight event.

In 2018, Sabay News named Lao Chetra as one of the top 5 Cambodian boxers most technically skilled in ability. He is known for having good technique and fighting spirit. His strengths are elbow strikes, knee strikes and punches. Lao Chetra fought Chan Bunhoeun for the finals of the Carabao belt. He said the match was energetic and extremely tense. Lao Chetra won by decision 3-2 for the belt and trophy as well as 20 million riel.

At ONE:Clash of Legends, 19 year old Lao Chetra was scheduled to fight 23 year old Superlek Kiatmoo9. Lao Chetra was defeated by Superlek Kiatmoo9 by unanimous decision.

In 2019, Lao Chetra knocked out Lorn Panha in the finals for the gold belt at PNN arena and won $10,000.

Medal record

Men's Muay

Representing Cambodia

Southeast Asian Games
Bronze medal – third place	2017 Kuala Lumpur	Men's 57 kg

Medal record

Men's Kun Khmer

Representing Cambodia

Southeast Asian Games
Gold medal – first place	2023 Phnom Penh	Men's 67 kg

At a 2023 IPCC February 11 event, Lao Chetra defeated Thai opponent Kolabkhav Sorchor Peak Outhoy on points.

Lao Chetra won a gold medal in the 67 kg weight division at the 32nd SEA Games in Cambodia. Chetra said he was happy he could win a gold medal for the people of Cambodia and the nation.

At the La Belle Equipe Khmer martial arts event in France, Lao Chetra lost by points to French athlete Anthony Defretin.

Lao Chetra's performance declined after he got injured and gained weight. As a result, The Kampuchea Thmey Daily considered Lorn Panha the new number one Kun Khmer boxer at 67 kg despite never being victorious against Lao Chetra. The two fighters have fought twice before and Lorn Panha has never won. However, Lorn Panha has seen his performance increased.

At the Golden Boy Kun Khmer 2025 event, Lao Chetra lost to Jose Manuel from Spain on points.

Lao Chetra is scheduled to compete at Bayon arena against Milad Mavout of Iran on October 25, 2025.

== Personal life ==
Lao Chetra comes from a martial arts family in Kun Khmer. His middle brother, Lao Chantrea is one of the best fighter in his weight class. His oldest brother, Lao Sinat, is a Cambodian combat sportsman. Outside of martial arts, he serves in the military as a member of an elite Special Forces commando unit. He is a student of the 911 parachute club.

== Fight record ==
Professional Kun Khmer record
Total fights: 146, 120 wins (33 (T)KOs), 21 losses, 5 draws
Date	Result	Opponent	Event	Location	Method	Round	Time
November 8, 2026	Win	(Belarus) Danila Kvach	TV5 Cambodia	Cambodia	Decision	3	
August 29, 2026	Win	(Morocco) Aissam Khaldoun	Hang Meas Boxing	Cambodia	KO	2	0:05
March 8, 2026	Win	(Iran) Seyed Amirhossein	Hang Meas Boxing	Cambodia	Decision	3	
January 18, 2026	Win	(Iran) Amir Vahabnia	Hang Meas Kun Khmer	Cambodia	TKO	2	0:48
December 7, 2025	Win	(Uzbekistan) Asadbek Mamatshiripov	TV5 Cambodia	Cambodia	KO	2	1:30
October 25, 2025	Win	(Iran) Milad Mavout	Bayon Television	Cambodia	KO	3	2:05
October 7, 2025	Draw	(China) Li Bolin	EM Legend x Krun Kun Khmer to China 2	Chengdu, Sichuan province, China	Decision	3	
September 13, 2025	Loss	(United States) Antonio Martinez	Krud Kun Khmer: Land of Peace	Cambodia	TKO	2	0:37
July 3, 2025	Loss	(Spain) Jose Manuel	Town Boxing	Phnom Penh, Cambodia	Decision	3	
May 31, 2025	Loss	(United States) Evan Boulton	KRUD KUN KHMER TO USA - Bayon Television	Tacoma, U.S.	Decision	3	
May 17, 2025	Win	(Uzbekistan) Bun Yotchan	Bayon Television	Kampong Thom Province, Cambodia	TKO(knee strike)	1	0:42
May 4, 2025	Win	(Spain) Marc Dass	Town Boxing	Cambodia	Decision	3	
March 29, 2025	Win	(Thailand) Narin Wonglakhon	CNC Sports	Cambodia	Decision	3	
February 1, 2025	Win	(Uzbekistan) Shokhzod Amazatov	Hang Meas Kun Khmer	Cambodia	KO	1	0:12
November 14, 2024	Win	(Iran) Ebrahim Kazem	CNC Boxing	Cambodia	Decision	3	
October 27, 2024	Win	(Iran) Hadi Chatabi	Krud Kun Khmer	Cambodia	Decision	3	
September 29, 2024	Loss	(Iran) Amen Moradi	PNN Sports	Phnom Penh, Cambodia	Decision	3	
June 27, 2024	Loss	(France) Anthony Defretin	Kun Khmer Super Fight 3: Paris	Paris, France	Decision	3	
May 19, 2024	Draw	(Thailand) Jaruadsuek Kiatnavy	Krud Kun Khmer	Cambodia	Decision	5	
March 31, 2024	Win	(Cambodia) Lorn Panha	Krud Kun Khmer	Phnom Penh, Cambodia	Decision	5	
February 4, 2024	Win	(Thailand) Sorgraw Petchyindee Academy	PNN Sports	Phnom Penh, Cambodia	TKO(low kick)	2	1:32
October 29, 2023	Win	(Cambodia) Yen Dina	Krud Kun Khmer	Phnom Penh, Cambodia	TKO(punches)	2	0:37
October 29, 2023	Win	(Myanmar) Anasin Pumea	Krud Kun Khmer	Phnom Penh, Cambodia	TKO(punches)	1	2:02
July 30, 2023	Win	(Thailand) Rithydeth	PNN Sports	Phnom Penh, Cambodia	Decision	5	
March 9, 2023	Win	(Cambodia) Som Vichai	Town Boxing	Phnom Penh, Cambodia	KO (knee strikes)	1	1:00
November 6, 2022	Draw	(Thailand) Saeksan Or. Kwanmuang	Kun Khmer All Star 5	Cambodia	Decision	3	
May 21, 2022	Draw	(Thailand) Saeksan Or. Kwanmuang	Tomoi	Malaysia	Decision	5	
April 10, 2022	Loss	(China) Wei Weiyang	Wu Lin Feng 2022: WLF in Cambodia	Angkor, Cambodia	Decision	3	3:00
October 27, 2021	Win	(Cambodia) Phal Sophorn	Kun Khmer All Star 2	Phnom Penh, Cambodia	Decision	3	
January 23, 2021	Win	(Cambodia) Soth Kevin	CNC Boxing	Cambodia	KO	4	2:00
September 26, 2020	Win	(Cambodia) Moeun Sokhuch	CNC Boxing	Phnom Penh, Cambodia	Decision	5	
September 6, 2020	Draw	(Cambodia) Yen Dina	Bayon TV	Cambodia	Decision	5	
June 9, 2019	Win	(Thailand) Kongsiam	PNN Sports	Phnom Penh, Cambodia	KO(punches)	2	2:35
February 16, 2019	Loss	(Thailand) Superlek Kiatmuu9	One Championship	Thailand	Decision	3	
December 31, 2018	Win	(Poland) Tomasz Lamnammoonmuaythai	TV5 Boxing	Phnom Penh, Cambodia	TKO(doctor's stoppage)	3	1:31
December 16, 2018	Win	(Cambodia) Chan Bunhoeurn	Bayon TV Boxing	Phnom Penh, Cambodia	Decision	5	
December 2, 2018	Win	(Thailand) Khumpichit	Bayon TV Boxing	Phnom Penh, Cambodia	KO(elbow strike)	3	
August 4, 2018	Win	(Thailand) Phingin	CNC Boxing	Phnom Penh, Cambodia	Decision	3	
July 6, 2018	Win	(Thailand) Farsootsai Phetchinda	Bayon TV Boxing	Phnom Penh, Cambodia	KO	2	1:00
May 27, 2018	Loss	(Cambodia) Phal Sophorn	Bayon TV Boxing	Phnom Penh, Cambodia	Decision	5	
December 8, 2017	Win	(Thailand) Roeunthai	Bayon TV Boxing	Phnom Penh, Cambodia	KO	1	2:09
November 25, 2017	Win	(Russia) Kazbek Alisultanov	Khmer-Thai Fight	Phnom Penh, Cambodia	Decision	3	
November 12, 2016	Draw	(Thailand) Phon Savath	SEATV Boxing	Cambodia	Decision	5	
