= Phal Sophorn =

Cambodian professional Kun Khmer fighter

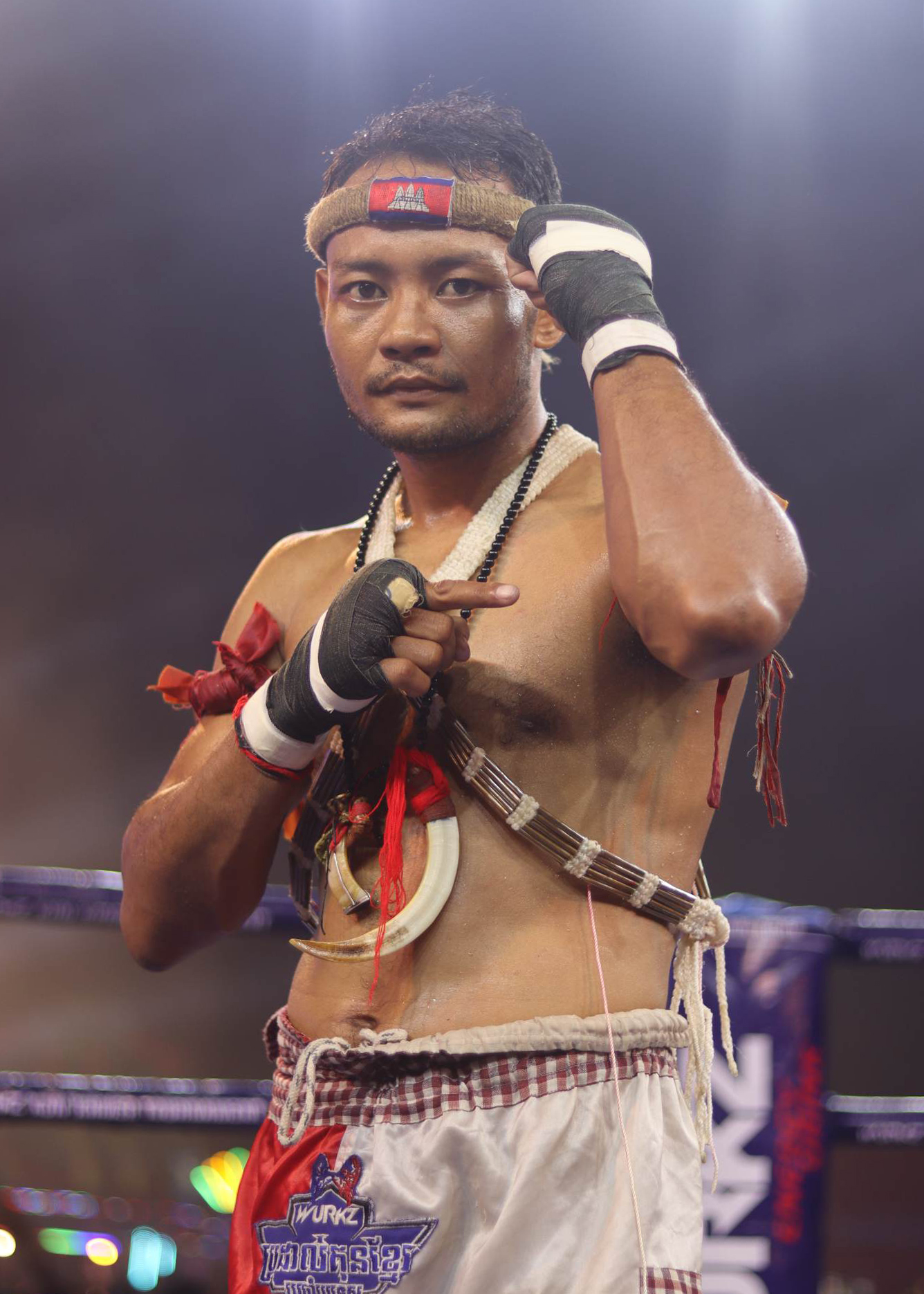
- Born: 1994 (age 31–32); Taley Village, Sangkat Dankor, Khan Dangkor, Phnom Penh
- Nickname: Nak Leng Keng Pi Kheat; Damrey Phluk Pi Kheat
- Height: 1.70 m (5 ft 7 in)
- Weight: 63.5 kg (140 lb; 10 st 0 lb)
- Style: Kun Khmer; Boxing
- Team: Taley Domrei Mean Rithi Club
- Years active: 2008-Present

Kickboxing record
- Total: 177
- Wins: 146
- By knockout: 60
- Losses: 28
- Draws: 3

Other information
- Occupation: Professional boxer
- Spouse: Mrs. Sarin Kim Eng

Phal Sophorn (Khmer: ផល សោភ័ណ្ឌ, born in 1994) is a Cambodian professional Kun Khmer fighter originally from the capital city of Phnom Penh. He has extensive experience in both boxing and Kun Khmer kickboxing. His ring nicknames is Nak Leng Keng Pi Kheat and Damrey Phluk Pi Kheat, which translate to "the Killer Elbow" and "the Killer Elephant" respectively. The Kampuchea Thmey Daily previously listed him as a top 10 Kun Khmer boxer in early 2023.

== Background ==
Sophorn was born in 1994 in Taley Village, Sangkat Dankao, Khan Dankao, Phnom Penh. He is married to Saren Kim Eng, and they have two children. Phal Sophorn is a police officer with the Ministry of Interior.

== Career ==
Sophorn's began in Kun Khmer boxing by training at the Taley Domrei Mean Rith Club, where he was inspired by his brother, Phal Sophat, a Cambodian national boxer. During his training, he was given the opportunity to compete and won a series of championships.

Phal Sophorn's abilities got better fast as he trained under his uncle. Phal Sophorn decided to transition from Kun Khmer to international boxing as his brother Sophat did. Phal Sophorn became a member of the Cambodian International Boxing Team in 2009. When Phal Sophorn returned to Kun Khmer, he surprised people with his dominating performance against Cambodian opponents and foreign opponents.

In 2016, Phal Sophorn defeated Vong Noy to win the 63.5 kg Cambodia Beer Championship at Bayon Boeung Snor.

Phal Sophorn defeated Khim Dima at Bayon Arena and won the 63.5 kg Carabao Championship in 2016.

In December 2016, Lao Chantrea defeated Phal Sophorn at the Kubota Championship at Bayon Boeung Snor Arena.

For the IPCC Kun Khmer World Championship, Phal Sophorn went undefeated in the group stage by winning all five matches. Phal Sophorn defeated Mon Prohm Manh in the semi-finals In July 2022, Sophorn knocked out Long Ben Loeun in just one minute, thereby becoming the International Professional Combat Council's Kun Khmer 63.5 kg Kram champion. Despite Long Ben Loeun's vow to defeat Phal Sophorn and win his first-ever title, he collapsed during their final match in ring of Town Arena.

Sophorn became the first Cambodian fighter to win the International Professional Combat Council's Kun Khmer 63.5 kg World Championship, organized by Town Arena.

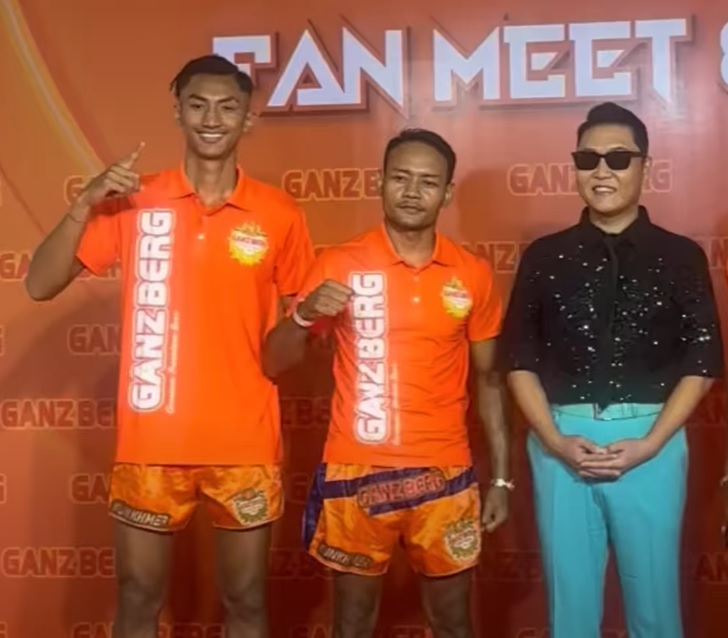
At a Ganzberg event, Eh Amarin Phouthong and Phal Sophorn meet Korean singer, Psy.

Phal Sophorn made Kampuchea Thmey Daily's top 10 list of Khmer boxers who had the best first half of 2023. Although Phal Sophorn did not make the national team, he won an International Khmer martial arts title.

Phal Sophorn was scheduled to compete against Kiamran Nabati on August 18, 2023 at RCC Fair Fight 22 in Moscow, Russia. Nabati was a top Russian kick boxer who was undefeated. After Kiamran Nabati defeated Phal Sophorn in the first round, Coach Eh Phouthong challenged Nabati to fight his son, Eh Amarin Phouthong. Nabati said he was only interested in the match if he was paid $50,000.

On September 30, 2023, Phal Sophorn won a Wurkz World IPCC Kun Khmer title after defeating Changpuak Jetsada by points.

At a January 19 Ganzberg Kun Khmer Kung Fu event, Phal Sophorn was scheduled to fight Liu Longquan in a 65 kg Kun Khmer bout.

== Championships and accomplishments ==
Kun Khmer

- 2016 (63.5 kg) Cambodia Beer Championship
- 2016 (63.5 kg) Carabao Championship
- 2022 (63.5 kg) IPCC Kun Khmer Championship
- 2023 (63.5 kg) IPCC Kun Khmer Championship

== Kun Khmer fight record ==
Professional Kun Khmer record
147 wins (61 TKOs), 28 loss, 03 draws
Date	Result	Opponent	Event	Location	Method	Round	Time
November 16, 2025	Draw	(Morocco) Zouhair Abou Elfdal	Town Boxing	Phnom Penh, Cambodia	Decision	3	
January 26, 2025	Win	(Morocco) Rayan	Town Boxing	Cambodia	KO	2	2:22
January 17, 2025	Win	(China) Lu Zijian	Town Boxing	Phnom Penh, Cambodia	TKO	1	0:34
December 26, 2024	Loss	(Spain) Jorge Pastor	Town Boxing	Cambodia	Decision	3	
December 15, 2024	Draw	(Iran) Majid Seydali	PNN Sports	Phnom Penh, Cambodia	Decision	3	
November 24, 2024	Win	(Uzbekistan) Ozod	Town Boxing	Phnom Penh, Cambodia	KO	2	1:20
August 10, 2024	Loss	(Poland) Oskar Siegert	Town Boxing	Phnom Penh, Cambodia	KO	2	2:28
July 11, 2024	Win	(Iran) Aliaschar Ghodrati	Town Boxing	Phnom Penh, Cambodia	KO	1	2:15
June 16, 2024	Win	(Iran) Abbaas Takaloo	Town Boxing	Phnom Penh, Cambodia	TKO	1	0:15
April 13, 2024	Win	(Russia) Dmitrii Kovtun	Town Boxing	Cambodia	Decision	3	
March 17, 2024	Win	(Myanmar) Thway Thit Maun	Town Boxing	Phnom Penh, Cambodia	Decision	3	
March 10, 2024	Win	(China) Chen Zhan Feng	Town Boxing	Phnom Penh, Cambodia	TKO	1	0:38
February 25, 2024	Win	(Thailand) Bakjo Sor. Anucha	Bayon TV	Phnom Penh, Cambodia	TKO	2	2:35
February 19, 2024	Win	(Thailand) Fah Prajak	Kun Khmer Mattrid Grand Fight Town Arena	Phnom Penh, Cambodia	TKO by (Low kick)	1	2:10
February 8, 2024	Win	(Myanmar) Aem We(Eh Mwi)	Town Boxing	Phnom Penh, Cambodia	Decision	3	
January 19, 2024	Win	(China) Liu Longquan	Town Boxing	Phnom Penh, Cambodia	Decision	3	
November 19, 2023	Win	(Thailand) Darkey	Kun Khmer Grand Champion	Phnom Penh, Cambodia	KO	2	1:20
November 5, 2023	Win	(China) Li Tiantao	Wurkz World Sena Kun Khmer	Phnom Penh, Cambodia	KO	2	3:00
September 30, 2023	Win	(Thailand) Changpuak Jetsada	I.P.C.C. Championship-Town	Phnom Penh, Cambodia	Decision	3	
September 3, 2023	Win	(Thailand) Kongrumkong Tor. Silachai	Town	Phnom Penh, Cambodia	KO	1	0:00
July 16, 2023	Win	(Portugal) Miguel Trindade	Town	Phnom Penh, Cambodia	Decision	3	
December 31, 2022	Win	(Thailand) Suablack Tor.Pran49	Town Boxing	Phnom Penh, Cambodia	Decision	3	
October 30, 2022	Win	(Thailand) Pmai Po. Kobkoeu	Town Boxing	Phnom Penh, Cambodia	TKO	1	4:15
July 30, 2022	Win	(Cambodia) Long Ben Loeun	I.P.C.C. Championship-Town	Phnom Penh, Cambodia	KO	1	1:58
June 11, 2022	Win	(Cambodia) Kong Sambo	Town	Phnom Penh, Cambodia	TKO	3	0:30
May 7, 2022	Loss	(Thailand) Suablack Tor.Pran49	Town Boxing	Phnom Penh, Cambodia	Decision	3	
April 3, 2022	Win	(Thailand) Naruto	Bayon TV Boxing	Phnom Penh, Cambodia	TKO	4	0:03
March 5, 2022	Win	(Cambodia) Lao Chetra	Bayon TV Boxing	Phnom Penh, Cambodia	Decision	5	
February 15, 2022	Loss	(Cambodia) Lao Chetra	TV5 Boxing	Phnom Penh, Cambodia	Decision	5	
February 4, 2022	Win	(Cambodia) Soum Vichhai	Bayon TV Boxing	Phnom Penh, Cambodia	Decision	5	
January 15, 2022	Win	(Cambodia) Moeun Sokhuch	Wurkz Boxing	Phnom Penh, Cambodia	Decision	5	
October 2, 2021	Loss	(Cambodia) Yen Dina	CNC Boxing	Phnom Penh, Cambodia	Decision	5	
September 10, 2021	Loss	(Cambodia) Yen Dina	Bayon TV Boxing	Phnom Penh, Cambodia	Decision	5	
July 11, 2021	Win	(Cambodia) Muth Klemkmao	Bayon TV Boxing	Phnom Penh, Cambodia	KO	1	1:32
April 9, 2021	Win	(Cambodia) Long Ben Loeun	Bayon TV Boxing	Phnom Penh, Cambodia	TKO	2	1:54
March 13, 2021	Loss	(Cambodia) Lorn Panha	Bayon TV Boxing	Phnom Penh, Cambodia	KO	3	0:42
January 31, 2021	Win	(Cambodia) Thun Chantak	Bayon TV Boxing	Phnom Penh, Cambodia	Decision	5	
July 12, 2020	Draw	(Cambodia) Moeun Sokhuch	Bayon TV Boxing	Phnom Penh, Cambodia	Decision	5	
June 28, 2020	Win	(Cambodia) Lorn Panha	Bayon TV Boxing	Phnom Penh, Cambodia	Decision	5	
June 7, 2020	Loss	(Cambodia) Moeun Sokhuch	CNC Boxing	Phnom Penh, Cambodia	Decision	5	
May 8, 2020	Win	(Cambodia) Kong Sambo	Bayon TV Boxing	Phnom Penh, Cambodia	KO	5	2:05
April 26, 2020	Draw	(Cambodia) Yen Dina	Bayon TV	Phnom Penh, Cambodia	Decision	5	
March 15, 2020	Draw	(China) Sun Zhixiang	MAS Fight	Phnom Penh, Cambodia	Decision	1	
September 21, 2019	Win	(Thailand) Chek Nuon(Jack Apichat)	Bayon TV boxing	Phnom Penh, Cambodia	Decision	5	
August 9, 2019	Win	(Thailand) Chek Nuon(Jack Apichat)	Bayon TV boxing	Phnom Penh, Cambodia	Decision	5	
December 29, 2018	Win	(Myanmar) Saw Min Min	TV5 Boxing	Phnom Penh, Cambodia	Decision	5	
September 30, 2018	Win	(Laos) Namphon	Bayon TV	Phnom Penh, Cambodia	KO	1	0:30
July 7, 2018	Win	(Thailand) Rongnapha	CNC Boxing	Phnom Penh, Cambodia	TKO	4	0:50
May 27, 2018	Win	(Cambodia) Lao Chetra	Bayon TV Boxing	Phnom Penh, Cambodia	Decision	5	
May 13, 2018	Win	(Cambodia) Chan Bunleap	Bayon TV Boxing	Phnom Penh, Cambodia	TKO	4	1:18
December 10, 2017	Draw	(Laos) Namphon	Bayon TV	Phnom Penh, Cambodia	Decision	5	
December 2, 2017	Win	(Uzbekistan) Bakhodirjon	CNC Boxing	Phnom Penh, Cambodia	TKO	3	1:47
September 30, 2017	Win	(Cambodia) Thol Makara	CNC Boxing	Phnom Penh, Cambodia	TKO	3	1:27
June 23, 2017	Win	(Thailand) Wifi	Bayon TV Boxing	Phnom Penh, Cambodia	Decision	5	
December 25, 2016	Loss	(Cambodia) Lao Chantrea	Bayon TV Boxing	Phnom Penh, Cambodia	Decision	5	
September 4, 2016	Loss	(Cambodia) Lao Chantrea	Bayon TV Boxing	Phnom Penh, Cambodia	KO	3	1:59
June 19, 2016	Win	(Cambodia) Khim Dima	Bayon TV Boxing	Phnom Penh, Cambodia	Decision	5	
October 19, 2014	Loss	(Cambodia) Pich Seyha	Bayon TV Boxing	Phnom Penh, Cambodia	Decision	5	
Legend: Win Loss Draw/no contest Notes

== Kickboxing Fight record ==
Professional Kickboxing record
0 wins (0 TKOs), 3 loss, 0 draws
Date	Result	Opponent	Event	Location	Method	Round	Time
May 14, 2024	Loss	(China) Zhang Lanpei	Ganzberg Kun Khmer, Cambodia vs China	Phnom Penh, Cambodia	Decision	3	3:00
August 18, 2023	Loss	(Russia) Kiamran Nabati	RCC Fair Fight 22	Yekaterinburg, Russia	KO (Spinning heel kick)	1	
April 10, 2022	Loss	(China) Wei Rui	Angkor King Fight	Siem Reap, Cambodia	Decision	3	
Legend: Win Loss Draw/no contest Notes
