= Faisal Zakaria =

- Born: Faisal Zakaria; 8 November 1973 (age 52); Sudan
- Other names: Diamond Flyer
- Nationality: Sudanese
- Height: 1.93 m (6 ft 4 in)
- Weight: 105 kg (231 lb; 16.5 st)
- Division: Heavyweight
- Style: Shotokan Karate
- Team: Diamond Flyer Muay Thai
- Last updated on: June 2, 2012

Faisal Zakaria (born 8 November 1973) is a Sudanese kickboxer, fighting out of Auckland, New Zealand. He was WBC International Muay Thai Heavyweight Champion.

== Biography and career ==
Faisal Zakaria was born and raised in Sudan. He started to train in karate and represented his country in international competition. In 1990, he left Sudan after political unrest and created a karate school in Libya with other Sudanese expats and trained and tutored in Syria, Greece, Turkey and Lebanon. It was in Lebanon that Zakaria was introduced to Muay Thai.

Faisal Zakaria went to Thailand and within six months was fighting professionally and building a strong following with his entertaining style. Zakaria holds notable victories over Eh Phoutong, Ricardo van den Bos and Saksit.

== Titles ==
- 2010 WBC Muaythai International Heavyweight Champion
- 2002 CBA International Champion
- 2004 WMC Super Middleweight World Championship.
- 2008 WMC SUPER MIDDLEWEIGHT WORLD CHAMPIONSHIP

== Kickboxing record ==
Kickboxing record
wins 150 (30 KO's), 25 losses, 25 draws
Date	Result	Opponent	Event	Location	Method	Round	Time
2016-04-23	Loss	(China) Asihati	Kunlun Fight 43	Zhoukou, China	TKO	2	
2016-03-22	Win	(United States) Steve Banks	Super Muaythai	China	Decision	3	3:00
2015-11	Win	(Thailand) Yak Nonaskin	Super Muaythai	Bangkok, Thailand	KO		
2013-11-11	Loss	(New Zealand) Tafa Misipati	The King in the Ring 7	Auckland, New Zealand	Decision (Unanimous)	3	3:00
2013-07-13	Loss	(New Zealand) Antz Nansen	The King in the Ring 7	Auckland, New Zealand	TKO (corner stoppage)	3	
2010-09-03	Loss	(New Zealand) Andrew Peck	Universal Soldier	Auckland, New Zealand	KO	4	0:45
For WMC Super Heavyweight Intercontinental Championship.
2010-07-10	Loss	(Australia) Ben Edwards	K-1 World Grand Prix 2010 in Canberra, Quarter Final	Canberra, Australia	KO (Left hook)	1	1:03
2010-01-02	Win	(Netherlands) Ricardo van den Bos	Battle at the Beach Show	Pattaya, Thailand	Decision (2-1)	5	3:00
Wins WBC Muay Thai International Heavyweight Championship.
2009-08-28	Loss	(New Zealand) Andre Meunier	Knees of Fury 26	Adelaide, Australia	KO (Uppercut)	3	
2009	Loss	(Japan) Sawi		Japan			
2009	Win	(Japan) San		Japan	TKO		
2009-05-30	Loss	(Turkey) Mehmet Ozer	The Challenger 2009	Macau, China	KO (Spinning back high kick)		
2009-05-30	Win	(Brazil) Eduardo Maiorino	The Challenger 2009	Macau, China	KO (Knee strike)		
2009	Loss	(Poland) Yan		China			
2008	Win	Fred		Okinawa, Japan	Decision		
2008	Loss	(Japan) Yagami		Tokyo, Japan			
2007-09-16	Loss	(Japan) Nobu Hayashi	TITANS NEOS II	Tokyo, Japan	Decision (2-0)	3	3:00
2007	Win	(Iran) Abus		Iran	Decision	5	3:00
2007-07-28	Loss	(Poland) Paul Slowinski	Fists of Fury	Singapore	TKO (Low kick)	4	0:08
For WMC Super Heavyweight World Championship.
2007-03-24	Win	(New Zealand) Terry Tutere	Who's the man!	Auckland, New Zealand	Decision	5	3:00
2006-12-04	Draw	(Germany) Mohammed Oudris	King's Birthday 2006	Bangkok, Thailand	Decision Draw	5	3:00
2006	Win	(Belarus) Andreas		New Zealand	Decision	5	3:00
2006	Win	(New Zealand) John Gallia		New Zealand	Decision	5	3:00
2005	Win	(New Zealand) Simon Dome		New Zealand	Decision	5	3:00
2005	Win	(New Zealand) Simon Dome		New Zealand	Decision	5	3:00
2005-11-18	Win	(New Zealand) John Gallia	Lee Gar vs The World	Auckland, New Zealand	KO (Knee strike)	2	
2005	Win	(New Zealand) Vinnie Mahoney		New Zealand	Decision	5	3:00
2004	Win	(Thailand) Saksit	Rajadamnern Stadium	Bangkok, Thailand	Decision	5	3:00
2004	Win	(Canada) Alex Ricci		Thailand	Decision	5	3:00
Wins WMC Super Middleweight World Championship.
2004	Win	(Thailand) Painiran Asani		Thailand	Decision	5	3:00
2003-11-19	Loss	(Russia) Magomed Magomedov	Golden Panther Cup, Semi Finals	Moscow, Russia	Decision		
2003-11-19	Win	Zabit	Golden Panther Cup, Quarter Finals	Moscow, Russia			
2003	Win	(Thailand) Painiran Asan		Thailand	KO		
2003	Loss	(Germany) Rob	Chaweng Stadium	Chaweng, Thailand	Decision		
2003	Win	Neils Elkand		Thailand	Decision	5	3:00
2003	Loss	Mohammed	King's Birthday 2003, Finals	Bangkok, Thailand	Decision		
2003	Win	Andreas	King's Birthday 2003, Semi Finals	Bangkok, Thailand	Decision		
2003-06-30	Loss	(Thailand) Lamsongkram Chuwattana	Rajadamnern Stadium	Bangkok, Thailand	Decision	5	3:00
2003-05-26	Loss	(Thailand) Kaoklai Kaennorsing	Rajadamnern Stadium	Bangkok, Thailand	Decision	5	3:00
2003	Loss	(Australia) Eugene Ekleboom		Thailand	Decision	5	3:00
2003	Win	(Hungary) Mraztyl		Abu Dhabi	KO		
2003	Win	Alexis		Thailand	Decision	5	3:00
2003	Loss	(Thailand) Mot Eck Muangsemaa		Thailand	Decision	5	3:00
2003	Loss	(Cambodia) Eh Phoutong	Olympic Stadium	Cambodia	Decision	5	3:00
2003-11	Loss	(Cambodia) Eh Phoutong	Olympic Stadium	Cambodia	Decision	5	3:00
Loses CBA International Championship.
2003	Win	(Thailand) Payak Sochionto		Thailand	Decision	5	3:00
2002	Win	(Thailand) Saksit	Rajadamnern Stadium	Bangkok, Thailand	Decision	5	3:00
2002	Win	(Hong Kong) Sawi		Hong Kong	Decision	5	3:00
2002-12-05	Loss	(Denmark) Ole Laursen	King's Birthday 2002, Final	Bangkok, Thailand	KO	2	
For King's Cup 2002 Tournament -70 kg Championship.
2002-12-05	Win	(Portugal) Nuno Martin	King's Birthday 2002, Semi Finals	Bangkok, Thailand			
2002	Loss	(Thailand) Saksit		Thailand	Decision	5	3:00
2002	Win	(Thailand) Noiya		Thailand	Decision	5	3:00
2002-10	Win	(Cambodia) Eh Phoutong	Borei Keila Stadium	Phnom Penh, Cambodia	Decision	5	3:00
Wins CBA International Championship.
2002	Win	(Thailand) Nokweed Devy	Chaweng Stadium	Chaweng, Thailand	Decision	5	3:00
2002	Win	(Thailand) Noiya		Thailand	Decision	5	3:00
2002	Win	(Thailand) Yoddecha Sityodthong		Thailand	KO		
2001-12-23	Loss	(Poland) Paul Slowinski		Bangkok, Thailand	TKO (Low kick)	3	
For WMC Light Heavyweight World Championship.
2001-09-08	Loss	(China) Sun Tao	China vs Thailand	Beijing, China	Decision	3	3:00
2001	Draw	(Cambodia) Eh Phoutong		Cambodia	Decision Draw	5	3:00
2001	Loss	(France) Yohan	Chaweng Stadium	Chaweng, Thailand	Decision	5	3:00
For WMC Super Middleweight World Championship.
2001	Win	(Thailand) Mot Eck Muangsemaa		Pattaya, Thailand	Decision	5	3:00
2001	Win	(Thailand) Caulan	Rajadamnern Stadium	Thailand	Decision	5	3:00
2000	Draw	(China) Li		China	Decision Draw	5	3:00
2000	Win	(Thailand) Sammat		Thailand	Decision	5	
2000	Win	(Thailand) Morono Tang		Thailand	Decision	5	
1999	Win	(United States) Jake Alvey			Decision	5	
1999	Win	(Thailand) Morono Tang		Thailand	Decision	5	
1999	Win	(United States) Mike Vieira			Decision	5	
1998	Win	Rubi		Lebanon	KO		
Legend: Win Loss Draw/No contest Notes
