= Sajad Sattari =

Iranian Muay Thai Kickboxer

- Born: Sajad Sattari Nejad; August 19, 2001 (age 25); Karaj, Iran
- Native name: سجاد ستاری
- Other names: Superman
- Nationality: Iranian
- Height: 180 cm (5 ft 11 in)
- Weight: 147 lb (67 kg; 10 st 7 lb)
- Division: Welterweight
- Reach: 70 in (178 cm)
- Style: Muay Thai
- Fighting out of: Karaj, Iran
- Team: Venum Training Camp
- Trainer: Mehdi Zatout
- Years active: 2016-present

Kickboxing record
- Total: 65
- Wins: 43
- Losses: 21
- Draws: 1

Sajad Sattari (Persian: سجاد ستاری, Standard Persian pronunciation: [saʤaːd sɔt̪t̪ɔriː]), born Sajad Sattari Nejad (Persian: سجاد ستاری نژاد; 19 August 2001) is an Iranian Muay Thai Kickboxer. He's the former Rajadamnern Stadium and WBC Muay Thai welterweight world champion. Sattari ranked No. 12 in WBC Muay Thai rankings.

== Muay Thai career ==
Sattari has won two championships and a runner-up title in the IFMA Youth world championships from 2016 to 2018.

In 2017, he won a silver medal at EMF Open Cup. In 2018, in addition to winning a gold medal, he was recognized as the best technical fighter in youth category.

Sajad Sattari has fought in Cambodia three times. In 2019, he defeated Elite Pheakdey by points at the CNC arena. In the same arena, he lost to Long Samnang twice by points.

From 2019 to 2020 Sattari had numerous fights in the Muay Thai Super Champ promotion.

In May 2022, Sattari became the first Iranian to win the WBC Muay Thai world championship.

Sattari is a vet in the Rajadamnern World Series having numerous fights while his biggest accomplishment with the promotion was on April 15, 2023, when Sattari defeated Yodkhunpon MoothongAcademy and won the Rajadamnern Stadium Welterweight (147 lbs) Champion. He became the only Iranian to capture the Rajadamnern belt and one of 14 non-Thai champions.

In 2023 he made his ONE FC debut securing a decision win against Rambo Mor Rattanabandit.

On January 31, 2026, at the Venum Fight 3 event held in Doha, Qatar, Sajad Sattari defeated Thai fighter Kaonar P.K. Saenchai Muaythaigym by knockout in the second round to win the WBC Muay Thai Welterweight Diamond Championship.

== Championships and awards ==
- International Federation of Muaythai Associations
  - (silver) 2016 IFMA Youth World Muay Thai Championship
  - (gold) 2017 IFMA Youth World Muay Thai Championship
  - (silver) 2018 IFMA Youth World Muay Thai Championship
- EMF Open Cup
  - (silver) 2017 EMF Open Cup
  - (gold) 2018 EMF Open Cup (The best technical fighter in youth category)
- World Boxing Council Muaythai
  - 2022 WBC Muay Thai -66.7 kg World Championship
  - 2026 WBC Welterweight Muay Thai Diamond Championship
- Rajadamnern Stadium
  - 2023 Rajadamnern Stadium Welterweight (147 lbs) Champion

== Karate Combat record ==
Res.	Record	Opponent	Method	Event	Date	Round	Time	Location	Notes
Win	3–0	Vitaly Shnyukov	Decision (unanimous)	RCC x Karate Combat Fight Night	October 17, 2026	3	3:00	Yekaterinburg, Russia	
Win	2–0	Alisher Karmenov	Decision (unanimous)	Karate Combat 60	March 27, 2026	4	3:00	Yekaterinburg, Russia	
Win	1-0	Mo Abdurahman	Decision (unanimous)	Karate Combat 54	May 2, 2025	3	3:00	Dubai, United Arab Emirates	

== Muay Thai record ==
Professional Muay Thai record
43 Wins, 21 Losses, 1 Draw
Date	Result	Opponent	Event	Location	Method	Round	Time
2026-12-12		(Iran) Bashir Mazreavi	Byon 9 – 67 kg World Grand Prix, Quarterfinals	Jakarta, Indonesia			
2026-07-25	Loss	(Thailand) Petchthongchai Sor.Sommai	Rajadamnern World Series	Bangkok, Thailand	Decision (Unanimous)	3	3:00
2026-01-31	Win	(Thailand) Kaonar P.K. Saenchai Muaythaigym	Venum Fight 3	Doha, Qatar	KO (Elbow)	2	1:26
Wins the WBC Welterweight Muay Thai Diamond Title.
2025-10-09	Loss	(Thailand) Saenpon Sor.Sommai	Rajadamnern World Series	Bangkok, Thailand	Decision (Unanimous)	3	3:00
2025-08-23	Win	(Russia) Kirill Khomutov	Rajadamnern World Series	Bangkok, Thailand	Decision (Unanimous)	3	3:00
2025-06-21	Win	(Thailand) Capitan Petchyindee Academy	Rajadamnern World Series	Bangkok, Thailand	Decision (Unanimous)	3	3:00
2025-02-01	Loss	(Thailand) Saenpon Sor.Sommai	Rajadamnern World Series	Bangkok, Thailand	Decision (Unanimous)	3	3:00
2024-11-30	Win	(Thailand) Petchaimate FighterMuaythai	Rajadamnern World Series	Bangkok, Thailand	Decision (Unanimous)	3	3:00
2024-09-07	Loss	(Thailand) Yodwicha Por.Boonsit	Rajadamnern World Series - Group Stage	Bangkok, Thailand	Decision (Split)	3	3:00
2024-08-04	Loss	(Australia) Max McVicker	Rajadamnern World Series - Group Stage	Bangkok, Thailand	Decision (Unanimous)	3	3:00
2024-06-22	Loss	(Thailand) Hercules Wor.Jakrawut	Rajadamnern World Series - Group Stage	Bangkok, Thailand	Decision (Unanimous)	3	3:00
2024-05-25	Win	(Thailand) Takruttone Banramba	Rajadamnern World Series	Bangkok, Thailand	Decision (Unanimous)	3	3:00
2024-04-14	Win	(Japan) Motoyasukku	Rajadamnern World Series Japan	Chiba, Japan	KO (Left elbow)	2	2:57
2023-09-29	Win	(Thailand) Rambo Mor.Rattanabandit	ONE Friday Fights 35, Lumpinee Stadium	Bangkok, Thailand	Decision (Unanimous)	3	3:00
2023-09-09	Win	(China) Luo Jie	Rajadamnern World Series	Bangkok, Thailand	Decision (Unanimous)	3	3:00
2023-07-29	Loss	(Thailand) Saenpon Petchpachara	Rajadamnern World Series - Group Stage	Bangkok, Thailand	Decision (Unanimous)	3	3:00
2023-06-24	Win	(Thailand) Hercules Phetsimean	Rajadamnern World Series - Group Stage	Bangkok, Thailand	Decision (Split)	3	3:00
2023-05-20	Win	(Japan) Yukimitsu Takahashi	Rajadamnern World Series - Group Stage	Bangkok, Thailand	TKO (Referee stoppage)	2	2:14
2023-04-15	Win	(Thailand) Yodkhunpon MoothongAcademy	Rajadamnern World Series	Bangkok, Thailand	Decision (Unanimous)	5	3:00
Wins the vacant Rajadamnern Stadium Welterweight (147 lbs) title.
2023-03-04	Win	(Cambodia) Kong Sambo	Rajadamnern World Series	Bangkok, Thailand	KO (Elbow)	2	2:34
2022-12-16	Loss	(Thailand) Yodkhunpon MoothongAcademy	Rajadamnern World Series	Bangkok, Thailand	Decision (Split)	3	3:00
2022-11-04	Win	(Thailand) Kratudtorn Sor.Yansri	Rajadamnern World Series	Bangkok, Thailand	Decision (Unanimous)	3	3:00
2022-09-30	Draw	(Thailand) Shadow Singmawynn	Rajadamnern World Series - Group Stage	Bangkok, Thailand	Decision (Majority)	3	3:00
2022-08-26	Win	(England) Jonny Betts	Rajadamnern World Series - Group Stage	Bangkok, Thailand	KO	1	1:32
2022-07-22	Loss	(Thailand) Mungkornkaw Sitkaewprapon	Rajadamnern World Series - Group Stage	Bangkok, Thailand	Decision	3	3:00
2022-05-14	Win	(Brazil) Julio Lobo	Venum Fight, Rajadamnern Stadium	Bangkok, Thailand	Decision	5	3:00
Won the WBC Muaythai Welterweight World Title.
2022-03-26	Win	(Thailand) Sritrang Tor.Buamas	FighterX	Hua Hin, Thailand	TKO	3	N/A
2022-03-05	Win	(Thailand) Jaroenporn Jpowerroofphuket	FighterX	Hua Hin, Thailand	TKO	5	N/A
2022-01-28	Win	(Thailand) RakThai Kiatchatchai	Muay Mun Wun Suk	Bangkok, Thailand	TKO (Low kick)	3	N/A
2021-12-25	Win	(Thailand) Jomhod Petch.Por.Tor.Or	Muay Hardcore	Phuket, Thailand	TKO	1	N/A
2021-12-03	Win	(Thailand) Jack Apichat	Suek Petchyindee, Rangsit Stadium	Bangkok, Thailand	TKO (Elbow)	3	N/A
2021-10-28	Loss	(Thailand) Jack Apichat	Suek Petchyindee, Rangsit Stadium	Buriram, Thailand	Decision	5	3:00
2021-04-03	Loss	(Thailand) Kongklai AnnyMuayThai	Thai Fight: Nan	Nan, Thailand	TKO (Punches)	2	N/A
2020-12-06	Loss	(Thailand) Sueablack PinyoMuayThai	Super Champ Muay Thai	Bangkok, Thailand	Decision	3	3:00
2020-11-01	Win	(Thailand) Petchsamui Lukjaoporongtom	Super Champ Muay Thai	Bangkok, Thailand	Decision	3	3:00
2020-01-19	Loss	(Thailand) Rastchasing KoratSportSchool	Super Champ Muay Thai	Bangkok, Thailand	Decision	3	3:00
2019-12-08	Win	(Thailand) Sumaei Phetkasem	Super Champ Muay Thai	Bangkok, Thailand	Decision	3	3:00
2019-11-23	Loss	(Cambodia) Long Samnang	CNC Boxing	Cambodia	Decision	5	3:00
2019-11-02	Win	(Thailand) F16 Sor.Sophit	Muay Hardcore	Bangkok, Thailand	KO (Punch)	2	2:10
2019-09-21	Loss	(Cambodia) Long Samnang	CNC Boxing	Cambodia	Decision (Split)	5	3:00
2019-09-06	Win	(China) Li Lianbang	Wu Lin Feng 2019: WLF at Lumpinee - China vs Thailand	Bangkok, Thailand	Decision	3	3:00
2019-08-25	Win	(Thailand) Petchtongkam Bangkokalaiyon	Super Champ Muay Thai	Bangkok, Thailand	KO (Elbow)	2	2:25
2019-07-27	Win	(Cambodia) Elit Pheakdeyn	CNC Boxing	Cambodia	Decision	5	3:00
Legend: Win Loss Draw/No contest Notes

Amateur Muaythai record
Date	Result	Opponent	Event	Location	Method	Round	Time
2018-08-08	Loss	(Russia) Roman Rojak	2018 IFMA Youth World Championship, Final	Bangkok, Thailand	Decision (0-0)	3	3:00
Wins IFMA Youth World Championships Silver Medal.
2018-08-07	Win	(Turkey) Enes Koz	2018 IFMA Youth World Championship, Semi Final	Bangkok, Thailand	Decision (29–28)	3	3:00
2018-08-05	Win	(Moldova) Ion Ungurean	2018 IFMA Youth World Championship, Quarter Final	Bangkok, Thailand	Decision (30–27)	3	3:00
2018-08-05	Win	(United States) Jonathan ONeill	2018 IFMA Youth World Championship, 1/8 Final	Bangkok, Thailand	Decision (30–27)	3	3:00
2017-08-03	Win	(Turkey) Mehmet Harun Erturk	2017 IFMA Youth World Championship, Final	Bangkok, Thailand	Decision (29–28)	3	3:00
Wins IFMA Youth World Championships Gold Medal.
2017-08-03	Win	(Belarus) Kvach Danila	2017 IFMA Youth World Championship, Semi Final	Bangkok, Thailand	Decision (30–27)	3	3:00
2017-08-03	Win	(Poland) Mateusz Matczak	2017 IFMA Youth World Championship, Quarter Final	Bangkok, Thailand	Forfeit (30–27)	3	3:00
Legend: Win Loss Draw/No contest Notes

== See also ==
- List of WBC Muaythai world champions
- List of Muay Thai practitioners
- List of male kickboxers
- Venum
