= Chhunly Pagenburg =

Cambodian footballer

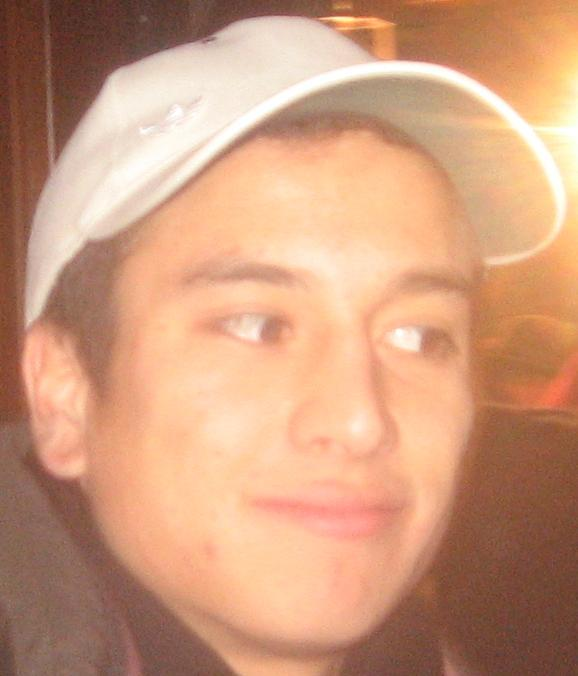
- Pagenburg in 2007.

Personal information
- Full name: Chhunly Pagenburg
- Date of birth: 10 November 1986 (age 40)
- Place of birth: Nuremberg, West Germany
- Height: 1.78 m (5 ft 10 in)
- Position: Striker

Youth career
- –1998: SB Phönix Nuremberg
- 1998–1999: Greuther Fürth
- 1999–2005: 1. FC Nürnberg

Senior career*
Years	Team	Apps	(Gls)
2004–2009	1. FC Nürnberg II	66	(23)
2006–2009	1. FC Nürnberg	14	(1)
2008	→ 1860 Munich II (loan)	8	(2)
2008	→ 1860 Munich (loan)	5	(0)
2009–2011	Rot-Weiß Erfurt	33	(5)
2011–2013	Eintracht Trier	53	(29)
2013–2015	FSV Frankfurt	4	(0)
Total		183	(60)

International career
2004–2005	Germany U19	5	(1)
2005	Germany U20	1	(0)
2013–2015	Cambodia	1	(0)
- * Club domestic league appearances and goals

Chhunly Pagenburg (born 10 November 1986) is a former professional footballer who played as a striker. Born in Germany, he played for the Cambodia national team.

== Club career ==
In 2011, Pagenburg was the highest paid athlete (along with Thun Sophea) from Cambodia, making $30,000 (USD).

He announced his retirement from professional football in February 2015 at the age of 28 due to chronic injury.

== International career ==
Pagenburg was invited to the Cambodia national team in 2010 by a journalist looking for players abroad.

In October 2013, he made two appearances for Cambodia in two friendlies but was unable to play at the 2013 SEA Games. He played his first official match on 19 November 2013 in a friendly against Guam.

== Honours ==
1. FC Nürnberg

- DFB-Pokal: 2006–07
