= Eh Amarin Phouthong =

Cambodian Kun Khmer boxer (born 2003)

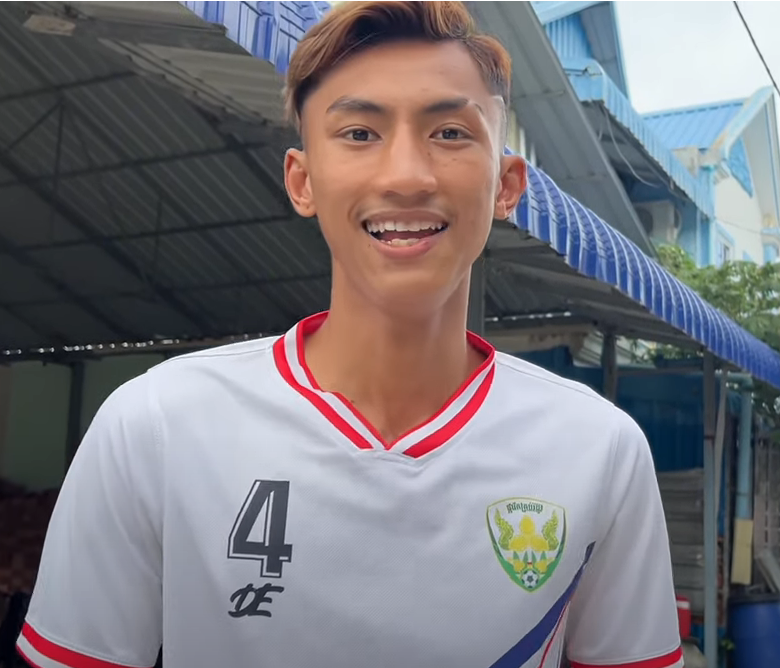
- Born: August 15, 2003 (age 23); Koh Kong province, Cambodia
- Other names: Amarin
- Height: 182 cm (6 ft 0 in)
- Weight: 65 kg (143 lb; 10 st 3 lb)
- Style: Pradal Serey and Vovinam

Kickboxing record
- Total: 78
- Wins: 70
- By knockout: 45
- Losses: 5
- Draws: 3

Other information
- Notable relatives: Eh Phouthong (father)

Eh Amarin Phouthong is a Cambodian Kun Khmer boxer and Vovinam fighter. He is a member of Cambodia's national Vovinam team. The Kampuchea Thmey Daily listed him as a top 10 Kun Khmer boxer for 2024. Eh Amarin Phouthong is a clinch fighting and knee specialist.

== Fighting Journey ==
Eh Amarin Phouthong started training in martial arts at the age of 12 under his father and older brother. He became successfully quickly through his physical gifts. He won a belt at the Hang Meas Arena by defeating veteran fighter Mon Samet in the final. He received a prize of 40 million riels.

In 2022, he scored a draw against Nabil in Thailand.

In 2023, he won a belt by beating Australian Clinton Corke in the fifth round via referee stoppage. Eh Amarin Phouthong received a new car after he won a belt at the Kun Khmer event in Australia. Amarin was given a chance to challenge his idol, Long Samnang, for his belt. Long Samnang won the match.

At the Kubota champion boxing night, Eh Amarin Phouthong beat Bui S. Suphap in the second round. The referee stop the match after his opponent was unable to continue the fight after a kick towards the thigh.

Amarin was absent from the national Vovinam competition. Instead of competing in the national championship, he competed at Town arena and defeated American fighter Christian Rage. During Khmer New Year 2024, Amarin defeated Russian fighter Ovanes Nagabedyan in the first round and won the Khmer International boxing championship.

He defeated Long Samnang to win a Kun Khmer federation title. The 65 kg KKF marathon belt had four contenders. In round one, Eh Amarin Phouthong knocked out Sot Veasna while Long Samnang beat Phan Par by points. In the final match, Eh Amarin faced Long Samnang. In the second round, Eh Amarin Phouthong saw an opening and hit Long Samnang via a left punch to the face causing him to be knock out unconsciously which resulted in the referee stopping the match.

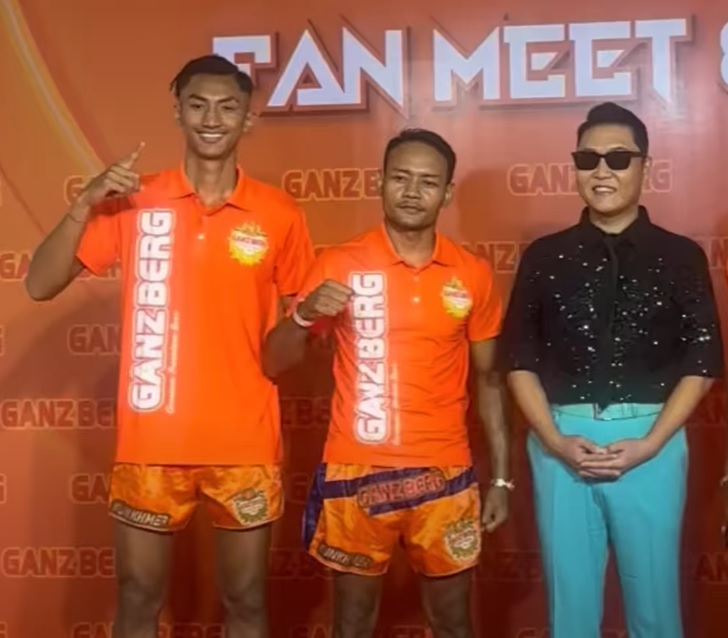
At a Ganzberg event, Eh Amarin Phouthong and Phal Sophorn meet Korean singer, Psy.

Eh Amarin Phouthong beat Danisam Weerasakreck in the overtime round in Japan in August 2024.

At a South Korean Kun Khmer event, Amarin is scheduled to compete in the 67 kg division against Australian Jerome Simbahan.

Amarin won another Kun Khmer title by beating Savelit Dorgravtsev in November 2024. Amarin beat Andrew Mitchell in Australia to earn a Kun Khmer federation title.

Fans wanted Amarin to fight Japanese boxer Taimu Hisai after he defeated many Cambodian athletes including Chhut Serey Vannthong and Pich Sambath.

At the Golden Boy Kun Khmer 2025 event hosted by Town Arena, Eh Amarin Phouthong defeated Spanish martial artist Javier Segura and won the 66 kg Golden Boy Trophy.

A team of Khmer martial artists including Eh Amarin Phouthong, Meun Mekhea, Sen Radet and Korom Chanreach will compete in the España vs Camboya Clash of Nations event in the Kingdom of Spain on February 7, 2026.

== Personal life ==
Eh Amarin Phouthong is the son of Eh Phouthong and Saing Somaly. Amarin Phouthong's goal for the future is to become famous like his father. According to him, he is only 10%-20% as famous as his father. Amarin has rarely lost a fight abroad and has competed internationally in South Korea, Australia, Thailand, and Japan.

Amarin filmed a commercial for a Honda Dream motorcycle with actress, Mean Sonyta.

== Martial arts lineage ==
Achar Chhit Sarim -- > Kru Eh Phouthong -- > Eh Amarin Phouthong

== Championships and accomplishments ==
- Fight Clubbing
  - 2026 Fight Clubbing Kun Khmer World Featherweight (-66kg) Champion

== Fight record ==
Professional Kun Khmer record
70 wins (45 (T)KOs), 5 losses, 3 draws
Date	Result	Opponent	Event	Location	Method	Round	Time
October 18, 2026	Win	(Italy) Thristan Massobrio	Fight Clubbing 44	Siem Reap, Cambodia	Decision (unanimous)	3	3:00
Wins the Fight Clubbing Kun Khmer World Featherweight (-66kg) title.
September 20, 2026	Win	(Poland) Oskar Siegert	Boostrong Kun Khmer	Cambodia	Decision	3	3:00
September 9, 2026	Win	(Japan) Hikaru Terashima	KNOCK OUT.68 ～KNOCKIN' on the WORLD～	Yokohama, Japan	KO (Right cross)	2	1:19
August 8, 2026	Win	(Brazil) Lucas Santos	Town Boxing	Cambodia	TKO (flying knee)	2	1:31
July 19, 2026	Win	(France) Derderian Mike	Town Boxing	Cambodia	TKO (flying knee)	1	1:26
May 2, 2026	Win	(Uzbekistan) Jafarbek Hikmatov	Town Boxing	Cambodia	KO (roundhouse kick)	1	2:07
April 24, 2026	Win	(China) Li Tianling	Town Boxing	Cambodia	TKO	1	2:37
April 15, 2026	Win	(Uzbekistan) Abdulloh	Town Boxing	Cambodia	KO	1	1:52
February 7, 2026	Loss	(Spain) Jorge Pastor	España vs Camboya: Clash of Nations	Spain	Decision	5	
January 7, 2026	Win	(Iran) Hesam	Town Boxing	Cambodia	TKO	2	2:39
November 5, 2025	Win	(United States) Evan Boulton	Town Boxing	Phnom Penh, Cambodia	Decision	3	
September 26, 2025	Loss	(United Kingdom) Mo Abdurahman	Town Boxing	Phnom Penh, Cambodia	Decision	3	
September 14, 2025	Win	(Iran) Saman	Town Boxing	Phnom Penh, Cambodia	TKO	1	6:14
August 30, 2025	Win	(Brazil) Tom MC	Town Boxing	Phnom Penh, Cambodia	TKO	1	0:57
August 14, 2025	Win	(Iran) Ako Fahad	Town Boxing	Phnom Penh, Cambodia	TKO	1	1:33
July 20, 2025	Win	(Japan) Reito Bravely	KNOCK OUT 55	Tokyo, Japan	KO (Left hook)	3	1:20
July 3, 2025	Win	(Spain) Javier Segura	Town Boxing	Phnom Penh, Cambodia	TKO	2	0:45
June 22, 2025	Win	(Russia) Umakhan Uvaisov	Town Boxing	Phnom Penh, Cambodia	KO	1	7:00
June 8, 2025	Win	(Australia) Jason Scott	Town Boxing	Cambodia	Decision	3	
June 1, 2025	Win	(Iran) Hassan Khan Zadeh	Dragon Kun Khmer	Cambodia	TKO (Low kicks)	2	2:00
May 4, 2025	Draw	(Argentina) Tomás Aguirre	Wurkz Kun Khmer Warriors	Phnom Penh, Cambodia	Decision	3	3:00
April 14, 2025	Win	(Portugal) Paulo Melo	Dragon Kun Khmer	Cambodia	TKO (Low kicks)	2	
April 6, 2025	Win	(Iran) Himan Piroti	Town Boxing - Wurkz Kun Khmer	Cambodia	TKO	1	2:10
March 16, 2025	Win	(China) Yan Wu	Town Boxing - Wurkz Kun Khmer	Phnom Penh, Cambodia	KO	1	0:35
March 9, 2025	Win	(China) Li Tiantao	Town Boxing	Cambodia	TKO (High kick)	1	2:37
March 1, 2025	Win	(Morocco) Salman Chouay	Town Boxing	Cambodia	TKO (flying knee)	2	0:02
February 14, 2025	Win	(Ukraine) Julian Pozdniakov	Town Boxing	Cambodia	Decision	3	
February 14, 2025	Win	(Spain) Jorge Pastor	Town Boxing	Cambodia	Decision	3	
January 31, 2025	Win	(Belarus) Daniil Dedovets	Town Boxing	Battambang, Cambodia	TKO	2	
January 19, 2025	Win	(Iran) Yassin	Town Boxing	Cambodia	KO (Knee)	1	0:25
December 31, 2024	Win	(Russia) Muslim Murtazaliev	Town Boxing	Banteay Meanchey Province, Cambodia	TKO (3 Knockdowns)	1	1:14
December 14, 2024	Win	(Australia) Andrew Mitchell	Ganzberg Khmer Martial Arts - BOB	Sydney, Australia	Decision	5	
December 1, 2024	Win	(Morocco) Nachid Abdelouahed	Town Boxing	Phnom Penh, Cambodia	TKO (Knee)	1	1:52
November 16, 2024	Win	(Russia) Savelit Dorogavtsev	Town Boxing	Phnom Penh, Cambodia	Decision	3	
October 24, 2024	Win	(Spain) Nico Sanabria	Town Boxing	Phnom Penh, Cambodia	Decision	3	
September 15, 2024	Win	(Australia) Jerome Simbahan	Town Boxing	Ansan, South Korea	Decision	3	
September 4, 2024	Win	(Philippines) Jonel Borbon	Town Boxing	Phnom Penh, Cambodia	KO (Low kick)	1	1:15
August 24, 2024	Win	(China) Zhang Tao	Town Boxing	Phnom Penh, Cambodia	TKO (Knees)	3	1:52
August 4, 2024	Win	(Thailand) Dansiam Weerasakreck	Knockout x Kun Khmer	Tokyo, Japan	TKO	4(Overtime)	2:16
July 13, 2024	Win	(Iran) Shyan Heydari	Town Boxing	Phnom Penh, Cambodia	TKO	2	1:16
July 7, 2024	Win	(Algeria) Yanis Ali	Town Boxing	Phnom Penh, Cambodia	KO	1	1:58
June 30, 2024	Win	(China) Yuan Wu	PNN Sports	Phnom Penh, Cambodia	KO	2	0:18
June 15, 2024	Win	(China) Yang Yunyi	Town Boxing	Phnom Penh, Cambodia	TKO	2	1:40
May 31, 2024	Win	(Cambodia) Long Samnang	Bayon Television	Phnom Penh, Cambodia	TKO	2	0:18
May 31, 2024	Win	(Cambodia) Sot Veasna	Bayon Television	Phnom Penh, Cambodia	TKO	2	0:05
May 12, 2024	Win	(Philippines) Dindo Kamansa	Town Boxing	Phnom Penh, Cambodia	KO	1	0:00
April 28, 2024	Win	(Thailand) Heng Trakan Kor.Kamonrat	Bayon Television	Phnom Penh, Cambodia	Decision	5	
April 13, 2024	Win	(Russia) Ovanes Nagabedyan	Town Boxing	Kampong Cham Province, Cambodia	TKO	1	0:12
March 31, 2024	Win	(Russia) Savelit Dorogavtsev	Town Boxing	Phnom Penh, Cambodia	Decision	4(Overtime)	
March 14, 2024	Win	(Japan) Kenta Yamada	Town Boxing	Phnom Penh, Cambodia	TKO	2	1:25
March 4, 2024	Win	(Thailand) Jaoboy	Town Boxing	Phnom Penh, Cambodia	TKO	2	0:33
February 18, 2024	Win	(Thailand) Lotus Petchrungruang	Town Boxing	Phnom Penh, Cambodia	TKO	1	0:50
February 4, 2024	Win	(Ukraine) Karien Minasian	Town Boxing	Phnom Penh, Cambodia	KO	1	2:02
January 19, 2024	Win	(Thailand) Bui Sor.Suphap	Bayon Television	Phnom Penh, Cambodia	TKO	2	0:02
January 5, 2024	Win	(Russia) Vlathsle	Town Boxing	Phnom Penh, Cambodia	KO	1	0:35
December 31, 2023	Win	(United States) Christian Rage	Town Boxing	Cambodia	Decision	3	
December 10, 2023	Loss	(Cambodia) Long Samnang	Ganzberg Kun Khmer	Phnom Penh, Cambodia	Decision	5	
November 23, 2023	Win	(Thailand) Sorgraw Petchyindee Academy	Town Boxing	Cambodia	Decision	3	
November 5, 2023	Win	(Australia) Clinton Corke	Kun Khmer Super Fight: BOB	Australia	TKO	5	1:09
October 1, 2023	Win	(Laos) Singtothorng	PNN Sports	Phnom Penh, Cambodia	KO	1	
July 2, 2023	Win	(Thailand) Neungtrakan	PNN Sports	Phnom Penh, Cambodia	Decision	5	
June 18, 2023	Win	(Thailand) Cho Kammongkol	Town Boxing	Phnom Penh, Cambodia	TKO	3	1:18
May 28, 2023	Win	(Thailand) Cho Kammongkol	Town Boxing	Phnom Penh, Cambodia	KO	3	2:22
November 11, 2022	Draw	(Thailand) Nabil Anane	Rajadamnern World Series	Bangkok, Thailand	Decision	3	
October 23, 2022	Win	(Thailand) Seng Thong Noy Muthong Academy	Town Boxing	Phnom Penh, Cambodia	TKO	1	5:40
August 27, 2022	Win	(Thailand) Jack Apichat	Carabao Boxing	Phnom Penh, Cambodia	Decision	5	
August 19, 2022	Win	(Thailand) Mangkornthong	Rangsit Stadium	Thailand	TKO(Knee strikes)	3	0:12
July 27, 2022	Win	(Iran) Mohammad	World Fight	Phnom Penh, Cambodia	Decision	3	
July 2, 2022	Win	(Thailand) Wuttidet	Town Boxing	Phnom Penh, Cambodia	TKO	2	1:02
June 18, 2022	Win	(Thailand) Rungravee Sasiprapa	Town Boxing	Phnom Penh, Cambodia	Decision	3	
October 3, 2020	Loss	(Cambodia) Bird Sangkhem	CNC Boxing	Phnom Penh, Cambodia	Decision	5	
July 18, 2020	Loss	(Cambodia) Bird Sangkhem	Bayon TV boxing	Phnom Penh, Cambodia	Decision	5	
July 7, 2019	Win	(Cambodia) Born Ponluk	SEA TV	Phnom Penh, Cambodia	Decision	5	
Legend: Win Loss Draw/No contest Notes
