= Soth Kevin =

Cambodian professional Kun Khmer boxer

Soth Kevin (សូត្រ ខេវិន) is a Cambodian professional Kun Khmer boxer.

== Boxing career ==
At the TV5 Boxing Knock-Out Series on September 14, 2019, Soth Kevin defeated Chet Sophi of the Rasmey Club of Banteay Meanchey Province on points. Kevin had the advantage due to being taller and more effectively used his knees and elbows.

On September 29, 2019, Soth Kevin lost to Thai martial artist Pangpond at MX Muay Xtreme Boxing Arena. His brother, Soth Bunthy, scored a draw with Thai martial artist Singthong Rie at the same event.

On October 10, 2020, Lorn Panha defeated Soth Kevin for the Cambodia Beer Championship in the 63.5 kg weight division. The first place winner received a prize of 24 milion riels($6,000) while second place winner, Soth Kevin, won 12 million riels.

Soth Kevin was scheduled to compete against Long Ben Meun on Saturday, January 2, 2021 at CNC Arena. Kevin said he had adequate training for the match against his taller opponent and prepared special moves for the match.

Soth Kevin was scheduled to compete with Long Samnang on Sunday, August 28, 2022 at PNN TV's Ganzberg One Strike.

Soth Kevin was scheduled to compete in the Cambodia Kun Khmer KKIF boxing event on Sunday, December 10, 2023 at Chip Mong Market. The event was broadcast live on BTV Cambodia and former Prime Minister Hun Sen donated 5 million riel to Soth Kevin as well as Chhoeung Lvai, Sok Thy, Ung Virak and Sok Rith.

On Saturday, November 9, 2024, Soth Kevin won a Super Muay title in Malaysia by defeating Malaysian Hakim by the first round with elbow strikes.

Soth Kevin won a belt from the I-1 World Supreme Championship in Hong Kong. On September 4, 2025, he defeated Siamese fighter, "Johnny", to win the 65 kg belt. His victory silenced his critics. He joined Chhoeung Lvai as the only Khmer athletes to win an I-1 World Supreme Championship. In the first round, Kevin dominated with elbow strikes and kicks. By the second round, Kevin landed more than 20 knee strikes weakening his opponent. In the third round, Kevin continued the pressure with elbow strikes and clinch-knees. A significant kick to the ribs left his opponent gasping and the judges gave the points victory to Kevin. Soth Kevin had a height advantage which made it easier for him to score elbows and knees.

== Fight record ==
Professional Kun Khmer record
Total fights: 68, 51 wins, 15 losses, 2 draws
| Date | Result | Opponent | Event | Location | Method | Round | Time |
| October 4, 2026 | Loss | (Belarus) Danila Kvach | TV5 Cambodia | Cambodia | TKO | 2 | 00:21 |
| September 20, 2026 | Loss | (Brazil) Igor Luiz de Souza | Town | Cambodia | Decision | 3 | |
| September 12, 2026 | Win | (Uzbekistan) Firdavs Erkinov | Hang Meas Boxing | Cambodia | TKO | 3 | 0:36 |
| April 5, 2026 | Win | (Iran) Majid Sedali | Kun Khmer on Bayon TV | Cambodia | KO | 1 | 01:01 |
| April 5, 2026 | Win | (Russia) Kostya Rudenko | Kun Khmer on Bayon TV | Cambodia | Decision | 3 | |
| March 21, 2026 | Loss | (Iran) Danial Mohammadi | Hang Meas Boxing | Cambodia | Decision | 3 | |
| January 30, 2026 | Win | (Myanmar) Ye Lin Oo | Town Boxing | Cambodia | TKO | 2 | 00:25 |
| November 29, 2025 | Loss | (Cambodia) Long Samnang | ISKA Krud Kun Khmer | Cambodia | Decision | 3 | |
| November 15, 2025 | Win | (Iran) Reza Khodadadi | Kun Khmer on Bayon TV | Phnom Penh, Cambodia | KO | 1 | 2:12 |
| November 9, 2025 | Win | (South Korea) Lee Yang-hoon | Town Boxing | Phnom Penh, Cambodia | KO | 2 | 0:52 |
| October 4, 2025 | Win | (China) Peng Yunxing | Town Boxing | Phnom Penh, Cambodia | TKO | 1 | 0:10 |
| September 4, 2025 | Win | (Thailand) Johnny | I-1 World Supreme Championship | Hong Kong, China | Decision | 3 | |
| July 18, 2025 | Win | (Ukraine) Mikita | Town Boxing | Phnom Penh, Cambodia | TKO | 2 | 2:18 |
| December 26, 2024 | Win | (Spain) Enren Kuras | Town Boxing | Phnom Penh, Cambodia | KO | 1 | 0:24 |
| November 9, 2024 | Win | (Malaysia) Hakim | Super Muay | Malaysia | KO | 1 | |
| September 26, 2024 | Win | (Iran) Mohammadreza | Town Boxing | Cambodia | Decision | 3 | |
| March 11, 2023 | Loss | (Thailand) Kaonar P.K. Saenchai | Suek Muay Yuen Tin | Surat Thani, Thailand | Decision | 5 | |
| January 23, 2021 | Loss | (Cambodia) Lao Chetra | CNC Boxing | Phnom Penh, Cambodia | KO | 4 | 2:00 |
| November 1, 2020 | Win | (Cambodia) Kham Saban | CNC Boxing | Phnom Penh, Cambodia | KO | 2 | 0:06 |
| October 10, 2020 | Loss | (Cambodia) Lorn Panha | CTN Boxing | Phnom Penh, Cambodia | Decision | 5 | |
| September 29, 2019 | Loss | (Thailand) Pangpond | MX Muay Extreme | Thailand | Decision | 3 | |
