= Long Samnang =

- Born: January 1, 1997 (age 29); Kampong Cham, Cambodia
- Other names: Sem Nang; Long Somnang
- Height: 170 cm (5 ft 7 in)
- Weight: 65 kg (143 lb; 10 st 3 lb)
- Style: Kun Khmer kickboxing
- Team: Salavorn Keila Boxing Club; KKIF
- Trainer: Long Salavorn

Kickboxing record
- Total: 123
- Wins: 89
- Losses: 30
- Draws: 4

Long Samnang (ឡុង សំណាង) or Sem Nang is a Cambodian Kun Khmer boxer and kickboxer. Samnang is a knee strike specialist. He is an ISKA Kun Khmer champion at 65 kg.

== Fighting career ==
Long Samnang was a member of the 2018 National Kun Khmer team. On September 9, 2018, Long Samnang defeated Pik Thieng by points at the Southeast Asian boxing championship finals at 63.5 kilograms. The Southeast Asian arena attracted a large crowd including fans, Coach Long Salavorn, Long Sophy, Bird Kham, and Phan Phatyuth. In attendance was also his father, younger siblings, teacher and senior students.

In 2018, Long Samnang was scheduled to compete in the new CBS arena. In a marathon tournament format, Long Samnang was scheduled to face Phitsaychun while Veng Sopheak would compete against Sakmonkhun. In the marathon format, the winner of the first round advances to the second round. If they win the second round, they win 4 million riel of prize money.

In 2019, he defeated Sajad Sattari twice at CNC arena.

At a PNN Kun Khmer event, Samnang was challenged by young fighter Eh Amarin Phouthong who viewed him as an idol. Samnang was declared the unanimous victor. Samnang acknowledge he was unsure he could retain the title due his opponent being taller and having a greater reach. Samnang scored more hits than Amarin.

In 2024, he defeated Chaiburi Looksinghanamchai, the inaugural 63 kg kard chuek tournament champion of the Thai Fight league.

Long Samnang competed for the KKF 65 kg marathon belt which had four contenders. Long Samnang defeated Phan Kran on points advancing to the finals. In the finals, Long Samnang faced Eh Amarin Phouthong. Eh Amarin Phouthong saw an opening and used a left punch to Long Samnang's face resulting in the referee ending the fight. Long Samnang received US$3,000 and a trophy for finishing second.

At the ISKA Krud Kun Khmer event on November 29, 2025, Long Samnang won the ISKA Kun Khmer belt at 65 kg by knocking out Brazilian athlete Bryan Moura in the second round.

Long Samnang was scheduled to compete against Sograw Petchinydee in Australia but the bout was canceled after a series of disagreements over weight and weigh-ins.

== Personal life ==
Long Samnang was a student of Coach Long Salavorn at Salavorn Sports boxing club. Most of Coach Salavorn's students are good at knee strikes. Long Samnang practiced his knee techniques to become famous as fellow disciples Long Sophy and Long Sovandoeun. His coach got his training at the Ministry of Interior club under Coach Meas Sokry and Coach Tith Maity. Long Samnang moved to the KKIF club in 2024.

== Kickboxing record ==
Professional Kickboxing record
Date	Result	Opponent	Event	Location	Method	Round	Time
June 22, 2024	Win	(South Korea) Jae Wan Song	MAX FC 27	Vung Tau, Vietnam	Decision	3	
Legend: Win Loss Draw/no contest Notes

== Kun Khmer record ==
Professional Kun Khmer record
Date	Result	Opponent	Event	Location	Method	Round	Time
September 11, 2026	Loss	(New Zealand) Khayden Taoa	Boostrong Kun Khmer to New Zealand	New Zealand	Decision	3	
August 8, 2026	Win	(Iran) Hosein Kordlou	Hang Meas Boxing	Phnom Penh, Cambodia	TKO	2	2:01
November 29, 2025	Win	(Brazil) Bryan Moura	ISKA Krud Kun Khmer Final	Cambodia	KO	2	
November 29, 2025	Win	(Cambodia) Soth Kevin	ISKA Krud Kun Khmer Semi-Final	Cambodia	Decision	3	
November 5, 2025	Win	(Belgium) Ouma Mahea	Bayon TV	Sihanoukville, Cambodia	Decision	3	
September 20, 2025	Win	(Iran) Saman Ashouri	CTN	Phnom Penh, Cambodia	TKO	2	0:49
July 5, 2025	Win	(New Zealand) Micheal Isaac	World Pro Kun Khmer Title	New Zealand	Decision	5	
July 26, 2024	Loss	(Uruguay) Ivan Bodeant	CTN	Cambodia	TKO	2	0:24
May 31, 2024	Loss	(Cambodia) Eh Amarin Phouthong	KKF 65 kg marathon belt final - Bayon Television	Cambodia	TKO	2	0:18
May 8, 2024	Win	(Cambodia) Phan Kran	KKF 65 kg marathon belt semi-final - Bayon Television	Cambodia	Decision	3	
April 28, 2024	Loss	(Cambodia) Lorn Panha	PNN Sports	Cambodia	TKO	3	
January 7, 2024	Win	(Thailand) Chaiburi Looksinghanamchai	Ganzberg Kun Khmer	Cambodia	Decision	3	
December 24, 2023	Loss	(Iran) Majid Seydali	PNN Boxing	Cambodia	Decision	5	
December 10, 2023	Win	(Cambodia) Eh Amarin Phouthong	Ganzberg Kun Khmer	Cambodia	Decision	5	
May 7, 2023	Win	(China) Luo Jie	Town	Phnom Penh, Cambodia	Decision	5	
July 30, 2022	Loss	(Thailand) Nattaphum	Town	Cambodia	TKO	1	0:13
January 30, 2022	Loss	(Cambodia) Suon Channy	Town	Cambodia	KO	1	1:36
January 15, 2022	Win	(Cambodia) Suon Channy	CNC TV	Cambodia	KO	1	1:37
August 28, 2021	Win	(Cambodia) Kong Sambo	CNC TV	Cambodia	Decision	5	
November 8, 2020	Win	(Cambodia) Thun Chantak	Bayon TV	Cambodia	Decision	5	
October 17, 2020	Win	(Cambodia) Chhean Hong	CNC Boxing	Cambodia	TKO	2	1:40
October 3, 2020	Win	(Cambodia) Moeun Sokhuch	CTN	Cambodia	KO	2	1:44
November 23, 2019	Win	(Iran) Sajad Sattari	CNC Boxing	Cambodia	Decision	5	
November 2, 2019	Win	(Cambodia) Kong Sambo	TV5 Cambodia	Cambodia	Decision	3	
September 21, 2019	Win	(Iran) Sajad Sattari	CNC Boxing	Cambodia	Decision	5	
August 15, 2019	Win	(France) Jordan	TV5 Cambodia	Cambodia	TKO	2	0:19
May 25, 2019	Win	(Brazil) Felipe Lobo	CNC Boxing	Cambodia	Decision	5	
Legend: Win Loss Draw/no contest Notes

== Muay Thai record ==
Professional Muay Thai record
Date	Result	Opponent	Event	Location	Method	Round	Time
February 4, 2023	Loss	(Thailand) Kaonar Sor.Jor.Tongprachin	LWC Super Champ, Lumpinee Stadium	Bangkok, Thailand	Decision	3	
September 8, 2019	Draw	(Thailand) Starboy Petchkiatpetch	MT Super Champ	Bangkok, Thailand	Decision	3	
Legend: Win Loss Draw/no contest Notes
