= Denpanom Pran26 =

Thai fighter (born 1996)

- Born: July 13, 1996 (age 30)
- Other names: Denpanom Ror.Kilacorath
- Height: 5 ft 10 in (178 cm)
- Weight: Middleweight
- Style: Muay Thai
- Stance: Orthodox
- Team: Pran26

Kickboxing record
- Total: 50
- Wins: 35
- Losses: 13
- Draws: 2

Denpanom Pran26 is a Muay Thai fighter from Thailand. He stands at 5'10 (178 cm) and trains with the Pran26 gym. Among his accomplishments, he holds the Omnoi Stadium Title at 69.8 kg. He is the current Lumpinee Stadium Middleweight champion.

At MTGP Fight Night 85, Denpanom won the MTGP world title with a unanimous decision in a five-round showdown against Michael Wakeling.

Denpanom recently fought at ONE Championship's ONE Friday Fight 30, where he faced Ricardo Bravo and was defeated by knockout in the second round. Despite some losses, Denpanom has notable victories, including wins over fighters like Mohammad Asadian and Michael Wakeling.

In 2023, he beat Emerson Bento to win the Lumpinee Stadium Middleweight Title.

For July 2024, he is ranked the number 6 contender in the middleweight division of the Rajadamnern Stadium rankings. For the August 2024 rankings, Combat Press ranked Denpanom Pran26, the 3rd best Muay Thai fighter in the middleweight division.

== Titles and accomplishments ==
- Lumpinee Stadium
  - Lumpinee Stadium Middleweight champion
- Omnoi Stadium
  - Omnoi Stadium champion (-69.8 kg)
- MTGP
  - MTGP Middleweight world champion (160 lbs.)

== See also ==
- Lumpinee Boxing Stadium
