= Kampuchea Thmey =

Cambodian newspaper

Kampuchea Thmey Daily Newds (Cambodia Today) is a Khmer language newspaper published in Cambodia with its headquarters in Phnom Penh.
