= Eh Phouthong =

Cambodian kickboxer and coach

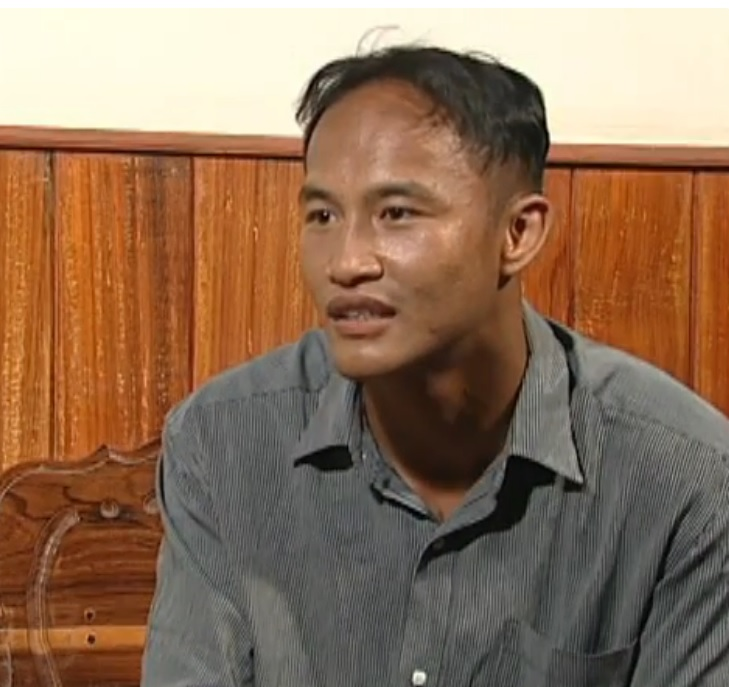
- Born: Eh Lim; October 14, 1975 (age 51); Koh Kong, Cambodia
- Other names: Atitep Chongkong Chhes
- Nationality: Cambodian
- Height: 1.80 m (5 ft 11 in)
- Weight: 48 kg (106 lb; 7.6 st); 63 kg (139 lb; 9.9 st); 80 kg (180 lb; 13 st); 85 kg (187 lb; 13.4 st)
- Style: Pradal serey
- Team: Ministry of National Defence, Cambodia
- Trainer: Chiit Sarim

Kickboxing record
- Total: 193
- Wins: 178
- Losses: 9
- Draws: 5
- No contests: 1

Other information
- Notable relatives: Eh Amarin Phouthong (son)

Medal record

Men's Boxing

Representing Cambodia

Southeast Asian Games
Bronze medal – third place	2009 Vientiane	Light heavyweight

Eh Phouthong (Khmer: អេ ភូថង, É Phuthâng [ʔeː pʰuːtʰɑːŋ]; born 1975), also spelled Ei Phouthang and Eh Phuthong is a retired Cambodian professional kickboxer, Kun Khmer fighter, former reality TV host and currently a distinguished martial arts coach. Eh Phouthong was known for his powerful right kick, considered a legend in Kun Khmer. He is the most famous kickboxer from Cambodia. The AFP described Eh Phouthong as "Cambodia's Muhammad Ali". As a multi-division gold medalist, he won gold medals in the national championship from 45 kg to 67 kg.

The Phnom Penh Post has recognized Eh Phouthong as the greatest kickboxer that Cambodia has ever produced. He began his martial arts training at the age of 12. By the age of 16, he moved to Phnom Penh from his hometown in Koh Kong province to train under Chhit Sarim at the Ministry of Defence Boxing Club. He made his competitive debut just a year later, at 17, becoming a pivotal chapter in the history of Cambodian kickboxing.

In addition to his fighting career, Eh Phouthong is a distinguished coach, known for nurturing talented martial artists. He is the trainer of Cambodian champion Thoeun Theara.

== Career ==
At age 11, Eh wanted to start training but was discouragrd by his father. Eh went searching for a teacher, while being coached by people within his village. Since his family was struggling financially, he was sent to live with his father' uncle—Governor Yuth Phouthong. In the 1980s, Eh Phouthong began training in pradal serey with Yuth Phouthong, who then held the position of Prey Veng provincial governor. His uncle started a club in Prey Veng province and Eh started training under a different teacher by the name of Mr. Kung Sroy.

After getting recognition, Eh moved from Prey Veng province to Phnom Penh and started training with coach Chhit Sarim and coach Kat Phun. His new coach, Chhit Sarim, was an experienced boxer who fought from 1960 to 1975 with 110 fights and only two losses. Eh Phouthong had his first Khmer traditional kickboxing contest at the age of 17. Eh said the first time he competed he only made between $4-$5. Eh initially began fighting at the 48 kg weight class and continued fighting until he reached the 63 kg weight class. Then he moved up to the weight class of 85 kg. According to his coach, Chhit Sarim, many foreign kickboxers didn't dare compete with Eh Phouthong because Eh Phouthong beat them by giving them a broken leg or broken arm. Growing up he did not have access to education because he was either working jobs to support his family or training in his passion of Khmer kickboxing.

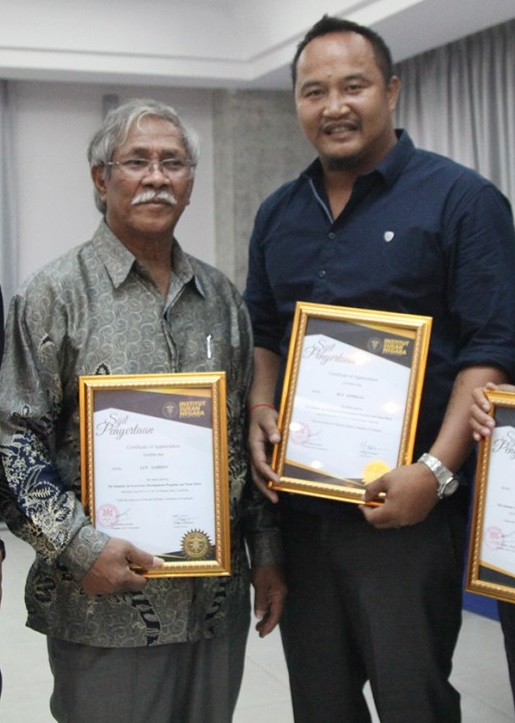
Eh Phouthong(right) with his coach, Grandmaster Chhit Sarim(left).

Eh Phouthong has explored media opportunities outside the ring. He has starred in two Khmer-language action films and was the co-host of CTN's highly rated reality show, Kun Khmer Champion. Finalist, Ai Kosal, is a boxer from 7NG, Eh Phouthong Boxing Club.

In 2001, he defeated French opponent Jean Charles for the third time. Eh Phouthong said, "I am tired, but I tried my best to fight with a strong French rival...My energy is weaker than foreign rivals, but their technique is no better than mine."

By 2003, he was already national champion for over three years and almost 4 years. In 2003, Eh Phouthong won the Kun Khmer CBA International Championship by defeating Sudanese fighter, Faisal Zakaria.

Eh Phouthong also journeyed next door to compete in Thailand. He is capable of speaking Thai as well as Khmer. He reached the semifinal in the first S1 championship in Thailand defeating X Rafi from Spain and losing in the 2nd round up to the eventual tournament champion Suriya Ploenchit. He previously expressed an interest in wanting to fight John Wayne Parr. He told reporter Scott Mallon that he had fought five times in Thailand. He had won 4 matches and only lost once on the Kings B-Day in Thailand. He told reporter Scott Mallon that he didn't know much about the fighters in Thailand or elsewhere.

By 2006, Eh Phouthong had amassed 150 fights. Of those fights, he had won 140 times. He had lost 6 times and had 4 draws.

In 2008, Eh Phouthong said he considered retiring after losing to Australian Adam Shahir Kayoom in the 85 kg weight division. He looked out of shape and sluggish. He said the problem was his diet and that his new home was far from the training club. Eh Phouthong's coach, Chhit Sarim, said he trained regularly but didn't rest enough afterward and was out with his friends too much. His coach said the best option would be retirement.

His local ring appearances decreased as he has aged. In June 2008, he was defeated by decision by American Benjamin Cahe.

He won a bronze medal in western boxing at the 2009 Southeast Asian Games at Laos in the 81 kg weight division.

In 2010, he faced Spaniard, Pitu Sans, in a rematch. In their rematch at TV3, Cambodian kickboxing sensation Eh Phouthong knocked out Spanish veteran Pitu Sans in the first round with a barrage of kicks. Eh Phouthong severely injured the seasoned Spanish fighter with just five kicks, causing damage to an arm and bruising his left shin. Referee Troeung Sossay intervened to deliver the standing eight count after Sans turned away in agony after receiving a series of four right roundhouse kicks in the first round. Although Sans wanted to continue, his corner threw in the towel.

=== Coaching ===
In 2005, Eh Phouthong started his own gym and boxing club, Eh Phouthong Tonle Bassac Club. Among his boxers were his younger brother, Auth Phouthong. His coach, Chhit Sarim, felt great satisfaction that his student Eh Phouthong was able to open a kickboxing club.

In 2023, Eh Phouthong won the "Best Coach Award" from the Khmer Boxing World Championship Techo Santepheap. This is his following statement on the matter: “I'm really happy. This is the first time I have won this award. It’s a great encouragement for me to put my efforts into promoting our Khmer martial arts.”

Eh Phouthong's gym was renamed Galaxy Navatra Eh Phouthong Club after Okhna Leng Navatra announced a partnership. On July 7, 2023, the Galaxy Navatra Eh Phouthong Khmer martial arts club was inaugurated. The ceremony was attended by Okhna Leng Pros who is general director of Galaxy Navatra group. He said the reason for the partnership with the club was to maintain the achievements and value of Eh Phouthong as the King of boxing in Cambodia. The partnership is set for five years.

== Personal life ==
He was born in Mondol Seima district, Koh Kong province, Cambodia. Eh Phouthong currently lives in Phnom Penh. He has a father named Yem Lim and a mother named At Uth. He also has a brother and a sister. His father and grandmother were also martial artists. Eh Phouthong's sons, Eh Virak Khamchit Phouthong (known as “Moeurn Mekia”) and Eh Amarin Phouthong, and daughter Eh Yanut are also Kun Khmer boxers.

Eh Phouthong is a big believer in traditional tattoos. He got his tattoos in Battambang by Sorn Sarin. In his early 20's, Eh got four "magic" designs on his body to ensure success. He said "It made a huge difference. I increased the number of victories and reduced the number of defeats. Yet you have to believe in the tattoos for them to be effective. Otherwise, it's just a waste of time."

== Fight Record ==
178 Wins, 9 Losses, 5 Draws, 1NC
Date	Result	Opponent	Event	Method	Round	Time
2016	Loss	(United States) Colt Thomas	Battle at the Boat boxing, United States	KO	1	0:16
2010	Loss	(Canada) Simon Marcus	Cambodia	Decision	5	
2010	Win	(Spain) Jose Pitu Sans	TV3 Kickboxing, Phnom Penh, Cambodia	TKO (Towel Thrown In)	1	
2009	Loss	(Australia) Harald Olsen	Australia	Decision	5	3:00
2008	Loss	(United States) Benjamin Cahe		Decision		
2008	Loss	(Australia) Adam Shahir Kayoom	Phnom Penh Olympic Stadium	Decision	5	3:00
2008	Win	(New Zealand) Tony Angelov	CTN Kickboxing: Cambodia Vs. New Zealand, Cambodia	TKO (Referee Stoppage)	2	0:35
2007-04-29	Win	(United States) Yoochy	TV5 Kickboxing, Phnom Penh, Cambodia	TKO (Injured Arm)	3	2:25
2007-01-21	Win	(Spain) Jose Pitu Sans	TV5 Kickboxing, Phnom Penh, Cambodia	TKO (Injured Arm)	2	0:38
2007	Win	(England) Shaun Lomas	CTN Kickboxing Phnom Penh, Cambodia	TKO (Injured Arm)	4	1:06
2007	Win	(United States) Mike Justice	CTN Kickboxing, Cambodia	Decision	5	
2006-08-21	NC	(Australia) Timor Daal	TV5 Kickboxing, Cambodia	No contest (Riot)		
2003	Win	(Australia) Perikli Maniatis	TV5 Kickboxing Cambodia	KO (Right Hook)	1	1:30
2003	Win	(Australia) Brett Franklin	TV5 Kickboxing Cambodia	KO (Right Roundhouse Kick)	2	
2003	Loss	(Thailand) Suriya Prasathinphimai	S1 World Championship, Thailand	Decision	3	
2003	Win	(Spain) Rafi Zouheir	S1 World Championship, Thailand	Decision	3	
2003	Win	(Sudan) Faisal Zakaria	Cambodian International Championship Belt, Cambodia	Decision	5	
2003	Win	(Sudan) Faisal Zakaria	Cambodian International Championship Belt, Cambodia	Decision	5	
2002	Loss	(Sudan) Faisal Zakaria	Cambodian International Championship Belt, Cambodia	TKO	5	
2002	Win	(Bulgaria) Antea Atomea	TV5 Kickboxing, Cambodia	TKO	1	0:58
2001	Draw	(Sudan) Faisal Zakaria	Cambodia	Decision Draw	5	3:00
2001–06	Win	(France) Jean-Charles Skarbowsky	Phnom Penh Stadium, Phnom Penh, Cambodia	TKO (Ref stop)	5	
2001–04	Win	(France) Jean-Charles Skarbowsky	Phnom Penh Stadium, Phnom Penh, Cambodia	TKO (Ref stop/elbow)	3	
2001-03-26	Win	(France) Jean-Charles Skarbowsky	Phnom Penh Stadium, Phnom Penh, Cambodia	TKO (Ref stop/downward elbow)	1	0:15
2000	Win	(Cambodia) Lorn Bunhoeurn	Cambodia Kickboxing	TKO		
2000	Win	(Cambodia) Lorn Bunhoeurn	Cambodia Kickboxing	Decision	5	
2000	Win	(Cambodia) Chan Sokhuch	Cambodia Kickboxing	TKO		
1999	Win	(Cambodia) Kong Sophorn	Cambodia Kickboxing	TKO		
1999	Win	(Cambodia) Chan Sokhuch	Cambodia Kickboxing	TKO		
1999	Win	(Cambodia) Vouey Bunthen	Cambodia Kickboxing	TKO		
1999	Win	(Cambodia) Vouey Chantha	Cambodia Kickboxing	TKO		

Legend:   Win    Loss    Draw/No contest    Notes 

|}

== See also ==
- List of male kickboxers

== Videos ==
- Dailymotion: Eh Phuthong vs. Antea Atomea
- youtube: Kun Khmer Champion
