= Yodkhunpon Sitmonchai =

Thai Muay Thai fighter

- Born: November 27, 1994 (age 31); Samut Sakhon, Thailand
- Other names: Yodkhunpon Mor. Rattanbandit; Yodkhunpon Yodkhunponmuaythai (ยอดขุนพล ยอดขุนพลมวยไทย); Yodkhunpon Moothong Academy (ยอดขุนพล หมูทองอะคาเดมี); Yodkhunpon Weerasakreck (ヨードクンポン・ウィラサクレック)
- Height: 176 cm (5 ft 9 in)
- Weight: 67 kg (148 lb; 10.6 st)
- Division: Flyweight; Super Flyweight; Super Bantamweight; Featherweight; Super Featherweight; Lightweight; Super Lightweight; Welterweight
- Reach: 68 in (173 cm)
- Stance: Orthodox
- Fighting out of: Nakhon Pathom, Thailand
- Team: Weerasakreck Fairtex; Moothong Academy; Sitmonchai

Kickboxing record
- Total: 145
- Wins: 105
- By knockout: 31
- Losses: 39
- Draws: 1

Yodkhunpon Sitmonchai (ยอดขุนพล ศิษย์มนต์ชัย) is a Thai Muay Thai and Kickboxing fighter.

As of October 2014 Yodkhunpon was ranked as the #8 ranked Featherweight kickboxer in the world by Liverkick.

== Biography and career ==
=== Early life and career ===
Yodkhunpon Sitmonchai was born Anont Iakarnna in Samut Sakhon, Thailand. He fought his first match at the age of six, securing a victory. He joined the distinguished Sitmonchai Gym at the age of eight and trained there until 2020.

He gained recognition early in his career for his speed, power and explosiveness. At the age of 16, he achieved impressive victories over notable Thai champions such as Aekmongkol, Kwankao, Jaisoo, Tingtong, and Yodtuantong. Yodkhunpon competes in the featherweight division and is known for his technical expertise, agility, and powerful strikes. Yodkhunpon participated in the 2014 Glory Featherweight Contendership Tournament at Glory 17: Los Angeles in Inglewood, California, US on June 21, 2014. He was defeated by Gabriel Varga in the semi-finals via unanimous decision.

On March 17, 2018 Yodkhunpon won the TOP KING World Series in the 70 kg division. He defeated Capitan Petchyindee Academy by decision in the semifinals and Manaowan Sitsongpeenong by decision in the final after scoring a knockdown to capture the 500,000 baht cash prize.

Yodkhunpon challenged Capitan Petchyindee Academy for his Lumpinee Stadium Super Welterweight title on January 3, 2020. He lost the fight by unanimous decision. The two of them fought a rematch a month later, with Capitan once against winning a decision.

Yodkhunpon faced Sajad Sattari for the vacant Rajadamnern Stadium Welterweight (147 lbs) Championship on April 15, 2023. After five rounds he lost the fight by unanimous decision.

On September 29, 2024, Yodkhunpon took part in an 8-man one night night tournament for the vacant K-1 Super Lightweight (-65kg) title at K-1 World MAX 2024. In the quarterfinals he knocked out Can Pinar with punches in the first round. In the semifinals he stopped Ionuț Popa after two knockdowns in the first round to advance in the tournament. In the final he faced Shu Inagaki and defeated him by majority decision to capture the vacant belt.

=== Outside the ring ===
Beyond his commitment to Muay Thai, Yodkhunpon Sitmonchai has pursued higher education at Rattana Bandit University, where he completed an undergraduate degree in Business Accounting. In February 2023 he achieved his dream of opening his own gym, Yodkhunpon Fight Club, which is located an hour outside of Bangkok in Om Yai, Nakhon Pathom.

=== Personal life ===
Yodkhunpon, known as "Muu" among his friends and family, loves football and his favourite team is Manchester United.

== Titles and accomplishments ==
=== Muay Thai ===
- Top King World Series
  - 2018 Top King World Series -70 kg Champion
- MX Muay Xtreme
  - 2022 Muay Xtreme -70 kg Champion

=== Kickboxing ===
- K-1
  - 2024 K-1 World GP Super Lightweight (-65kg) Champion

== Fight record ==
Muay Thai & Kickboxing Record
105 Wins (31 (T)KOs), 39 Losses, 1 Draw
Date	Result	Opponent	Event	Location	Method	Round	Time
2026-11-27		(Thailand) Dechawalit Silkmuaythai	ONE The Inner Circle 40, Lumpinee Stadium	Bangkok, Thailand			
2026-06-26	Win	(Turkey) Semih Şah Cindir	ONE Friday Fights 160, Lumpinee Stadium	Bangkok, Thailand	KO (Left hook)	2	2:49
2025-05-31	Win	(Japan) Shu Inagaki	K-1 Beyond	Yokohama, Japan	KO (Left hook)	2	1:26
Yodkhunpon was stripped of the K-1 Super Lightweight title after missing weight, only Inagaki was eligible to win it.
2025-03-29	Loss	(China) Meng Gaofeng	Wu Lin Feng 553	Tangshan, China	Decision (Unanimous)	3	3:00
Yodkhunpon was deducted a point for missing weight and another point for clinching.
2025-02-09	Win	(Japan) Hayato Suzuki	K-1 World MAX 2025	Tokyo, Japan	TKO (Punches)	1	1:26
Defends the K-1 Super Lightweight (-65kg) title.
2024-11-02	Win	(Wales) Luke Bar	X Fighting Championship	Birmingham, England	KO (Elbow)	2	
2024-09-29	Win	(Japan) Shu Inagaki	K-1 World MAX 2024 - 65 kg Championship Tournament, Final	Tokyo, Japan	Decision (Majority)	3	3:00
Wins K-1 World GP -65kg Tournament and the vacant K-1 Super Lightweight (-65kg) title.
2024-09-29	Win	(Romania) Ionuț Popa	K-1 World MAX 2024 - 65 kg Championship Tournament, Semifinals	Tokyo, Japan	TKO (2 Knockdowns)	1	1:10
2024-09-29	Win	(Turkey) Can Pinar	K-1 World MAX 2024 - 65 kg Championship Tournament, Quarterfinals	Tokyo, Japan	TKO (2 Knockdowns)	1	2:50
2024-06-29	Loss	(China) Meng Lingkuo	Kunlun Fight 100	Tongling, China	KO (Punches)	1	
2024-03-30	Loss	(China) Zhu Shuai	Wu Lin Feng 20th Year Anniversary	Tangshan, China	Decision (Unanimous)	3	3:00
2023-09-02	Loss	(Thailand) Hercules Wor.Jakrawut	Rajadamnern World Series - Final 4	Bangkok, Thailand	Decision (Unanimous)	3	3:00
2023-07-29	Win	(Ukraine) Sergey Kulyaba	Rajadamnern World Series - Group Stage	Bangkok, Thailand	Decision (Unanimous)	3	3:00
2023-06-24	Loss	(Thailand) Rittewada Petchyindee Academy	Rajadamnern World Series - Group Stage	Bangkok, Thailand	Decision (Unanimous)	3	3:00
2023-05-20	Win	(France) Fabrice Delannon	Rajadamnern World Series - Group Stage	Bangkok, Thailand	KO (Right cross)	3	1:12
2023-04-15	Loss	(Iran) Sajad Sattari	Rajadamnern World Series	Bangkok, Thailand	Decision (Unanimous)	5	3:00
For the vacant Rajadamnern Stadium Welterweight (147 lbs) title.
2023-02-11	Win	(Brazil) Jos Mendonca	Rajadamnern World Series + Petchyindee	Bangkok, Thailand	Decision (Unanimous)	3	3:00
2022-12-16	Win	(Iran) Sajad Sattari	Rajadamnern World Series	Bangkok, Thailand	Decision (Split)	3	3:00
2022-11-04	Loss	(Thailand) Shadow Singmawynn	Rajadamnern World Series - Semi Final	Bangkok, Thailand	Decision (Unanimous)	3	3:00
2022-09-30	Loss	(Thailand) Sibmuen Sitchefboontham	Rajadamnern World Series - Group Stage	Bangkok, Thailand	Decision (Unanimous)	3	3:00
2022-08-26	Win	(Algeria) Mohamed Cheboub	Rajadamnern World Series - Group Stage	Bangkok, Thailand	Decision (Unanimous)	3	3:00
2022-07-22	Win	(Brazil) Julio Lobo	Rajadamnern World Series - Group Stage	Bangkok, Thailand	KO (Left hook)	2	
2022-04-30	Win	(Algeria) Yanis Mazouni	MX MUAY XTREME	Phuket, Thailand	KO (Right hook)	1	0:42
Wins Muay Xtreme -70kg title.
2022-03-25	Loss	(Cambodia) Thoeun Theara	Kun Khmer All Star 3	Phnom Penh, Cambodia	TKO (Elbow)	1	2:20
2021-10-22	Draw	(United States) Rafael Angobaldo	Muay Hardcore	Thailand	Decision	3	3:00
2020-02-07	Loss	(Thailand) Capitan Petchyindee Academy	Lumpinee Stadium	Bangkok, Thailand	Decision	5	3:00
2020-01-03	Loss	(Thailand) Capitan Petchyindee Academy	Lumpinee Stadium	Bangkok, Thailand	Decision	5	3:00
For the Lumpinee Stadium 154 lbs title.
2019-11-29	Win	(Thailand) Sorgraw Petchyindee	Lumpinee Stadium	Bangkok, Thailand	Decision	5	3:00
2018-12-31	Loss	(Thailand) Simanoot Sor.Sarinya	Top King World Series 27, Semi Final	Thailand	Decision	3	3:00
2018-09-29	Win	(Russia) Nikita Gerasimovich	Top King World Series 22	Thailand	Decision (unanimous)	3	3:00
2018-06-16	Win	(Germany) Fabian Hundt	Top King World Series 21	Surat Thani, Thailand	Decision (unanimous)	3	3:00
2018-05-26	Win	(Portugal) Luis Passos	Top King World Series 20	Bangkok, Thailand	Decision	3	3:00
2018-05-12	Loss	(Scotland) George Mann	Rebellion Muay Thai 19	Melbourne, Australia	Decision (Split)	5	3:00
2018-03-17	Win	(Thailand) Manaowan Sitsongpeenong	Topking World Series 18, Final	Ayutthaya province, Thailand	Decision	3	3:00
Wins Top King World Series 154 lbs title.
2018-03-17	Win	(Thailand) Capitan Petchyindee Academy	Topking World Series 18, Semi Final	Ayutthaya province, Thailand	Decision	3	3:00
2017-11-17	Win	(China) Liu Lei	EM Legend 25	Sandu, China	Decision	3	3:00
2017-09-30	Loss	(Morocco) Tyjani Beztati	Glory 45: Amsterdam	Amsterdam, Netherlands	Decision (Unanimous)	3	3:00
2017-07-09	Loss	(China) Guo Dongwang	EM Legend 21	Chongqing, China	Decision	3	3:00
2017-05-27	Win	(Australia) Ben Mahony	Top King World Series 13	Wuhan, China	Decision (unanimous)	3	3:00
2017-04-29	Loss	(Denmark) Niclas Larsen	Glory 40: Copenhagen	Copenhagen, Denmark	Decision (unanimous)	3	3:00
2017-01-14	Loss	(Russia) Arbi Emiev	Top King World Series 12, Semi Final	China	Decision	3	3:00
2016-11-27	Win	(France) Kevin Renahy	Top King World Series 11	Nanchang, China	TKO	3	
2016-08-27	Win	(Russia) Aleksandr Pisarev	Top King World Series 10	China	Decision	3	3:00
2016-07-10	Win	(Portugal) Esteban Lopez	Top King World Series 9	Luoyang, China	TKO (Punches)	1	
2016-06-05	Loss	(Belarus) Farkhad Akhmejanau	The Legend of Emei 9	Chengdu, China	Ext.R Decision	4	3:00
2016-04-29	Loss	(Thailand) YodDiesel LukchoaMaeSaiThong	Toyota Marathon, Quarter Final	Chonburi, Thailand	Decision	3	3:00
2016-02-27	Loss	(Thailand) Sang-Uthai Sor.Jor.Piek-Uthai	Omnoi Stadium	Samut Sakhon, Thailand	Decision	5	3:00
2015-12-26	Loss	(Thailand) Capitan Petchyindee Academy	Omnoi Stadium - Isuzu Cup, Semi Final	Samut Sakhon, Thailand	Decision	5	3:00
2015-11-14	Win	(Thailand) Suayngarm Pumphanmuang	Omnoi Stadium - Isuzu Cup	Samut Sakhon, Thailand	KO	1	
2015-10-07	Win	(Thailand) Chokdee Sor.Thanaphet	Omnoi Stadium - Isuzu Cup	Samut Sakhon, Thailand	KO (Flying Elbow)	3	
2015-09-05	Win	(Thailand) Sang-Uthai Sor.Jor.Piek-Uthai	Omnoi Stadium - Isuzu Cup	Samut Sakhon, Thailand	Decision	5	3:00
2015-04-14	Win	(Thailand) Armin Pumpanmuang		Bang Saphan District, Thailand	KO	3	
2014-06-21	Loss	(Canada) Gabriel Varga	Glory 17: Los Angeles - Featherweight Contender Tournament, Semi Final	Inglewood, California, US	Decision (Unanimous)	3	3:00
2014-04-12	Win	(Armenia) Raz Sarkisjan	Glory 15: Istanbul	Istanbul, Turkey	Decision (Majority)	3	3:00
2013-11-04	Loss	(Thailand) Chamuaktong Fightermuaythai	Rajadamnern Stadium	Bangkok, Thailand	Decision	5	3:00
2013-09-17	Loss	(Thailand) Yodtuantong Petchyindeeacademy	Lumpinee Stadium	Bangkok, Thailand	Decision	5	3:00
2013-07-26	Win	(Thailand) Yodtuantong Petchyindeeacademy	Lumpinee Stadium	Bangkok, Thailand	Decision	5	3:00
2013-05-03	Win	(Thailand) Denkiri Sor.Sommai	Lumpinee Stadium	Bangkok, Thailand	Decision	5	3:00
2013-04-09	Loss	(Thailand) Yokwithaya Petseemuan	Lumpinee Stadium	Bangkok, Thailand	Decision	5	3:00
2013-01-25	Loss	(Thailand) Palangtip Nor Sripung	Lumpinee Stadium	Bangkok, Thailand	Decision	5	3:00
2012-11-10	Win	(Thailand) Lekkla Thanasuranakorn	Ladprao Stadium	Bangkok, Thailand	Decision	5	3:00
2012-10-04	Win	(Thailand) Palangtip Nor Sripung	Rajadamnern Stadium	Bangkok, Thailand	Decision	5	3:00
2012-09-11	Loss	(Thailand) Petpanomrung Kiatmuu9	Petchpiya Fights, Lumpinee Stadium	Bangkok, Thailand	Decision	5	3:00
2012-07-06	Win	(Thailand) Jaisu Thor.Thepsuthin	Lumpinee Stadium	Bangkok, Thailand	KO (Punches)	1	
Wins 2 million bahts side-bet.
2012-05-25	Win	(Thailand) Kwankhao Mor.Ratanabandit	Petchpiya, Lumpinee Stadium	Bangkok, Thailand	KO (Punches)	1	
2012-04-03	Win	(Thailand) Kwankhao Mor.Ratanabandit	Petchyindee, Lumpinee Stadium	Bangkok, Thailand	Decision	5	3:00
2012-03-13	Win	(Thailand) Dechsakda Sitsonpeenong	Lumpinee Stadium	Bangkok, Thailand	Decision	5	3:00
2012-02-03	Win	(Thailand) Dechsakda Sitsonpeenong	Lumpinee Stadium	Bangkok, Thailand	Decision	5	3:00
2012-01-10	Win	(Thailand) Danchai Kiatphatthaphan	Petchpiya, Lumpinee Stadium	Bangkok, Thailand	KO	2	
2011-12-16	Win	(Thailand) Ekmongkol Gaiyanghadao	Fairtex, Lumpinee Stadium	Bangkok, Thailand	Decision	5	3:00
2011-09-13	Win	(Thailand) Maphit Sitsonpeenong	Petchpiya, Lumpinee Stadium	Bangkok, Thailand	Decision	5	3:00
2011-07-26	Loss	(Thailand) Ekmongkol Gaiyanghadao	Lumpinee Stadium	Bangkok, Thailand	Decision	5	3:00
2011-06-14	Win	(Thailand) Mondam Sor.Weerapon	Petchyindee, Lumpinee Stadium	Bangkok, Thailand	KO (Punches)	2	
2011-05-20	Loss	(Thailand) Dechsakda Sitsonpeenong	Lumpinee Stadium	Bangkok, Thailand	Decision	5	3:00
2011-04-29	Win	(Thailand) Thongchai Sitsongpeenong		Thailand	TKO	2	
2011-04-06	Win	(Thailand) Kiatsak Sit-Odpibul	Daorungprabat, Rajadamnern Stadium	Bangkok, Thailand	Decision	5	3:00
2010-11-23	Loss	(Thailand) Yodwicha Por Boonsit	Lumpinee Stadium	Bangkok, Thailand	Decision	5	3:00
2010-10-08	Win	(Thailand) Newwangchan Sor.Kittika	Weerapon, Lumpinee Stadium	Bangkok, Thailand	KO	1	
2010-02-27	Win	(Thailand) Kaichon Sor.Boonyiam	Lumpinee Krikkrai, Lumpinee Stadium	Bangkok, Thailand	KO	3	
2010-01-30	Win	(Thailand) Petchchartchai Chaoraioi	Lumpinee Krikkrai, Lumpinee Stadium	Bangkok, Thailand	Decision	5	3:00
2009-08-14	Win	(Thailand) Rattanachat Kor.Petchnangrong	Petchyindee, Lumpinee Stadium	Bangkok, Thailand	Decision	5	3:00
Legend: Win Loss Draw/No contest Notes
