= Joe Ryan (fighter) =

British Muay Thai Kickboxer (born 2004)

- Born: Joseph Christopher Ryan; 14 April 2004 (age 22); Birkenhead, United Kingdom
- Nickname: The Rhino
- Height: 184 cm (6 ft 0 in)
- Division: Middleweight
- Style: Muay Thai
- Stance: Orthodox
- Fighting out of: Liverpool, United Kingdom
- Team: Two Brothers Muay Thai

Kickboxing record
- Total: 21
- Wins: 18
- By knockout: 8
- Losses: 2
- By knockout: 0
- Draws: 1

Mixed martial arts record
- Total: 1
- Wins: 1
- By knockout: 1
- Losses: 0

Joseph Christopher Ryan (born 14 April 2004) is a British Muay Thai fighter. He is the current WMO, and ISKA World Middleweight Champion as well as a former Rajadamnern Stadium and WBC Middleweight Champion.

== Professional muay thai career ==
Ryan faced Jose Manuel Hita for the WBC Muay Thai Middleweight (160 lbs) European title at Supershowdown 3 on June 28, 2022. He won the fight by unanimous decision.

On Saturday, October 29, 2022, Joe Ryan was scheduled to fight Alex Bublea at Lumpinee Stadium with Fairtex Fight promotion.

Ryan faced Ignasi Larios Alvez for the ISKA World Muaythai Light-middleweight (160 lbs) world title at Masda Fight Night on December 17, 2022. He won the fight by a first-round knockout and became the youngest ISKA champion in history at just 18 years old.

Ryan faced Magnus Andersson for the vacant WMO Middleweight (160 lbs) World title at Hitman Fight League on June 10, 2023. He won the fight by a first-round knockout, 51 seconds into the opening round.

Ryan faced Reza Ahmadnezhad at the September 23, 2023, Rajadamnern World Series. He won the fight by unanimous decision.

Ryan faced Petchmai SiadamMhoopraraRajadamnern for the vacant Rajadamnern Stadium Middleweight (160 lbs) title on December 16, 2023. He became the first ever British Rajadamnern Stadium world champion, as he captured the championship by unanimous decision.

Joe Ryan won the 2023 Fight Record UK Male Fighter of the Year award. The top 3 final scores vote were Joe Ryan(10 pts), Nico Carrillo(9 pts) and Jonathan Haggerty(8 pts). Joe Ryan finished the year with a 4-1 record and won the WMO Muay Thai World title as well as defending successfully the WBC MuayThai European title.

Ryan made his first Rajadamnern Stadium Middleweight (160 lbs) title defense against Victor Hugo on April 20, 2024.

In July 7, 2024, Ryan defended the WMO middleweight world title against David Pennimpede and won by decision, a month after in August, Joe Ryan was able to capture the WBC Muay Thai middleweight world title against Beckham BigWinChampionGym winning by decision.

The World Muay Thai Organization formerly ranked him in their top 15 pound-for-pound male fighter list during October 2024.

During his reign as the WMO, WBC Muay Thai, ISKA and Rajadmnern Stadium world champion he was ranked number one in the world in the middleweight division by combat press.

In November 2024 Ryan defended the Rajadmnern Stadium title against Petchmorakot Petchyindee Academy and lost the title by decision.

In February 2025 Ryan defended the WBC Muay Thai title against Kongthailand Kiatnavy and lost by decision.

== Titles and accomplishments ==
=== Professional ===
- Rajadamnern Stadium
  - 2023 Rajadamnern Stadium Middleweight (160 lbs) Champion
    - One successful title defense
- World Muay Thai Organization
  - 2023 WMO World Middleweight (160 lbs) Champion
    - One successful title defense
- International Sport Karate Association
  - 2022 ISKA World Muaythai Light-Middleweight (-72.5 kg / 160 lb) Champion
- World Boxing Council Muaythai
  - 2024 WBC Muay Thai World Middleweight (-72.5 kg / 160 lb) Champion
  - 2022 WBC Muay Thai European Middleweight (-72.5 kg / 160 lb) Champion
    - One successful title defense

=== Amateur ===
- International Federation of Muaythai Associations
  - 2019 IFMA Baltic Open Junior (14-15) Championships (-63.5 kg) (gold)
  - 2019 IFMA World Junior (14-15) Championships (-63.5 kg) (gold)
  - 2022 IFMA European Junior (16-17) Championships (-75 kg) (gold)
- World Boxing Council Muaythai
  - 2019 WBC Muay Thai U-18 National Champion

== Mixed martial arts record ==
Professional record breakdown
1 match	1 win	0 losses
By knockout	1	0

Res.	Record	Opponent	Method	Event	Date	Round	Time	Location	Notes
		Gabriel Hoarau		Full Contact Contender 48	November 14, 2026			Bolton, England	
Win	1–0	Sidney Aguero	TKO (elbow and punches)	Full Contact Contender 46	June 6, 2026	1	1:03	Bolton, England	Welterweight debut.

== Muay Thai record ==
Professional Muay Thai record
18 Wins (8 (T)KOs), 3 Losses, 1 Draw
Date	Result	Opponent	Event	Location	Method	Round	Time
2025-02-22	Loss	(Thailand) Kongthailand Kiatnavy	Hungryside Super Show	Bentley, Australia	Decision	5	3:00
Loses the WBC Muay Thai Middleweight (160 lbs) World title.
2024-11-16	Loss	(Thailand) Petchmorakot Petchyindee Academy	Rajadamnern World Series	Bangkok, Thailand	Decision (Unanimous)	5	3:00
Loses the Rajadamnern Stadium Middleweight (160 lbs) title.
2024-08-10	Win	(Thailand) Beckham BigWinChampionGym	Hungryside Super Show	Glasgow, Scotland	Decision (Unanimous)	5	3:00
Wins the vacant WBC Muay Thai Middleweight (160 lbs) World title.
2024-07-06	Win	(Australia) David Pennimpede	Powerhouse Fight Series	Mackay, Australia	Decision (Unanimous)	5	3:00
Defends the WMO Middleweight (160 lbs) World title.
2024-04-20	Win	(Brazil) Victor Hugo	Rajadamnern World Series	Bangkok, Thailand	Decision (Unanimous)	5	3:00
Defends the Rajadamnern Stadium Middleweight (160 lbs) title.
2023-12-16	Win	(Thailand) Petchmai SiadamMhooprara	Rajadamnern World Series	Bangkok, Thailand	Decision (Unanimous)	5	3:00
Wins the vacant Rajadamnern Stadium Middleweight (160 lbs) title.
2023-09-23	Win	(Iran) Reza Ahmadnezhad	Rajadamnern World Series	Bangkok, Thailand	Decision (Unanimous)	3	3:00
2023-08-19	Loss	(Brazil) Emerson Bento	Rajadamnern World Series - Final 4	Bangkok, Thailand	Decision (Unanimous)	3	3:00
2023-06-10	Win	(Sweden) Magnus Andersson	Hitman Fight League	Manchester, England	KO (Right High Kick)	1	0:51
Wins the vacant WMO Middleweight (160 lbs) World title.
2023-03-04	Win	(France) Omar Samb	Supershowdown	Bolton, England	KO (Knee)	2	
Defends the WBC Muay Thai Middleweight (160 lbs) European title.
2022-12-17	Win	(Spain) Ignasi Larios Alvez	Masda Fight Night	Liverpool, England	KO (Left High Kick)	1	
Wins the ISKA World Muaythai Light-middleweight (160 lbs) title.
2022-06-28	Win	(Spain) Jose Manuel Hita	Supershowdown 3	Bolton, England	Decision (Unanimous)	5	3:00
Wins the WBC Muay Thai Middleweight (160 lbs) European title.
2022-03-19	Win	(Scotland) Chris Shaw	Science of 8 Muay Thai	Liverpool, England	Decision	5	3:00
2021-12-18	Win	(Spain) Toni Romero	Masda Fight Night	Liverpool, England	KO (Elbow)	2	
2021-11-02	Win	(United Kingdom) Jay Nolan	Stand Your Ground 11	Wallasey, England	TKO		
2021-10-24	Draw	(United Kingdom) Tayo Zahir	SuperShowdown	Manchester, England	Decision	3	3:00
2021-08-08	Win	(United Kingdom) Uzzy Choudhry	Yokkao 49				
2021-05-23	Win	(United Kingdom) Hayden Sherriff	Masda Fight Night	Liverpool, England	TKO (Left hok to the body)	1	
Legend: Win Loss Draw/No contest Notes

Amateur Muay Thai Record
Date	Result	Opponent	Event	Location	Method	Round	Time
2022-02-19	Win	(Russia) Kirill Gribov	2022 IFMA European Muaythai Championships, Tournament Final	Istanbul, Turkey	Decision (Unanimous)	3	2:00
Wins the 2022 IFMA European Muaythai Junior (16-17) Championships (-75 kg) Gold Medal.
2022-02-18	Win	(Cyprus) Kyriakos Christodoulou	2022 IFMA European Muaythai Championships, Tournament Semifinal	Istanbul, Turkey	Decision (Unanimous)	3	2:00
2019-10-05	Win	(Ukraine) Filypp Bachynskyi	2019 IFMA World Muaythai Championships, Tournament Final	Antalya, Turkey	Decision (Split)	3	2:00
Wins the 2019 IFMA World Muaythai Junior (14-15) Championships (-63.5 kg) Gold Medal.
2019-10-04	Win	(Russia) Semen Bondarenko	2019 IFMA World Muaythai Championships, Tournament Semifinal	Antalya, Turkey	Decision (Unanimous)	3	2:00
2019-10-02	Win	(Iran) Ashkan Hemeh Ali	2019 IFMA World Muaythai Championships, Tournament Quarterfinal	Antalya, Turkey	Decision (Unanimous)	3	2:00
2019-09-30	Win	(New Zealand) Ohomairangi Takeshi-Vercoe	2019 IFMA World Muaythai Championships, Tournament Opening Round	Antalya, Turkey	Decision (Unanimous)	3	2:00
2019-02-23	Win	(United Kingdom) Harvey White	Stand Your Ground 8	Liverpool, United Kingdom	KO	3	
Wins the WBC Muay Thai U-18 National title.
2019-02-02	Win	(Estonia) Emil Dzafarov	2019 IFMA Baltic Open, Tournament Final	Vilnius, Latvia	Decision (Unanimous)	3	2:00
Wins the 2019 IFMA Baltic Open Junior (14-15) Championships (-63.5 kg) Gold Medal.
2019-02-01	Win	(Belarus) Ilya Vasilko	2019 IFMA Baltic Open, Tournament Semifinal	Vilnius, Latvia	Decision (Unanimous)	3	2:00
2018-08-06	Loss	(Turkey) İbrahİm Ethem Çakir	2018 IFMA World Muaythai Championships, Tournament Quarterfinal	Bangkok, Thailand	Decision (Unanimous)	3	2:00
2018-08-04	Win	(Ukraine) Maksym Klierini	2018 IFMA World Muaythai Championships, Tournament Opening Round	Bangkok, Thailand	Decision (Unanimous)	3	2:00
Legend: Win Loss Draw/No contest Notes

== See also ==
- Rajadamnern Stadium
