= Talaytong Sor.Thanaphet =

Thai Muay Thai kickboxer

Talaytong
- Born: 1993 (age 32–33); Buriram, Thailand
- Other names: Talaythong GrakcuGym
- Nationality: Thai
- Height: 1.77 m (5 ft 9 1/2 in)
- Weight: 72 kg (159 lb; 11.3 st)
- Style: Muay Thai
- Fighting out of: Bangkok, Thailand
- Team: KelaSport

Talaytong Sor.Thanapet (Thai: ทะเลทอง ส.ธนาเพชร), is a Thai Muay Thai fighter.

== Titles and accomplishments ==
- Lumpinee Stadium
  - 2018 Lumpinee Stadium Super-welterweight (154 lb) Champion
- Professional Boxing Association of Thailand (PAT)
  - 2018 Thailand - 154 lbs Champion
- Channel 7 Stadium
  - 2018 Channel 7 Stadium -154 lbs Champion (1 defense)

== Muay Thai record ==
Muay Thai record
73 Wins, 34 Losses
| Date | Result | Opponent | Event | Location | Method | Round | Time |
| 2026-26-09 | Loss | (Australia) Hugh O'Donnell | Road to RWS, Rajadamnern Stadium | Bangkok, Thailand | Decision | 3 | 3:00 |
| 2025-01-25 | Win | (United States) Ian Greer | Rajadamnern World Series | Bangkok, Thailand | Decision (Unanimous) | 3 | 3:00 |
| 2024-11-09 | Loss | (Turkey) Burak Poyraz | Rajadamnern World Series | Bangkok, Thailand | Decision | 3 | 3:00 |
| 2024-10-27 | Win | (China) Chen Jiacheng | EWD Championship 2024 | Shenzhen, China | Decision | 3 | 3:00 |
| 2024-01-13 | Loss | (Thailand) Petchmai SiadammooplaraRajadamnern | Kiatpetch Super Fight, World Siam Stadium | Bangkok, Thailand | Decision | 5 | 3:00 |
| 2023-11-18 | Win | (Brazil) Brader Manopgym | Kiatpetch Super Fight, World Siam Stadium | Bangkok, Thailand | Decision | 5 | 3:00 |
| 2023-07-22 | Win | (Thailand) Chamluek ChamluekMuayThaiGym | Ruamponkon Samui, Phetchbuncha Stadium | Koh Samui, Thailand | KO | 5 | |
| 2023-06-17 | Win | (Thailand) Samingdet Dechafaifa | Ruamponkon Samui, Phetchbuncha Stadium | Koh Samui, Thailand | Decision | 5 | 3:00 |
| 2023-03-18 | Loss | (Thailand) Chalamsuk ChalamsukMuaythaigym | Ruamponkon Samui, Phetchbuncha Stadium | Koh Samui, Thailand | Decision | 5 | 3:00 |
| 2023-01-21 | Loss | (Thailand) Petchmai SiadammooplaraRajadamnern | Samui Super Fight: Ruamponkon Samui, Phetchbuncha Stadium | Koh Samui, Thailand | Decision (unanimous) | 5 | 3:00 |
| 2022-11-26 | Loss | (Thailand) Petchkantat MUded | Ruamponkon Samui: Samui Super Fight Petchbuncha Stadium | Ko Samui, Thailand | Decision | 5 | 3:00 |
| 2022-08-06 | Loss | (Thailand) Yodphupha Tor.Yotha | Road to ONE: Thailand 1, Lumpinee Stadium | Bangkok, Thailand | TKO (Punch) | 1 | 2:36 |
| 2022-06-25 | Win | (Brazil) Victor Guilherme | Fairtex, Lumpinee Stadium | Bangkok, Thailand | Decision | 5 | 3:00 |
| 2022-05-07 | Loss | (Thailand) Petchkantat MUded | TorNamThai TKO Kiatpetch, Lumpinee Stadium | Bangkok, Thailand | Decision | 5 | 3:00 |
| 2022-02-26 | Loss | (Brazil) Luis Cajaiba | Muaythai Lumpinee TKO, Lumpinee Stadium | Bangkok, Thailand | Decision | 5 | 3:00 |
| 2021-11-20 | Loss | (Thailand) Saenpon PetchpatcharaAcademy | Omnnoi Stadium | Samut Sakhon, Thailand | Decision | 5 | 3:00 |
For the Thailand -154 lbs title.
| 2021-03-29 | Win | (Thailand) Khunsuk Sitchefboontham | Chef Boontham, Rangsit Stadium | Rangsit, Thailand | Decision | 5 | 3:00 |
| 2020-02-12 | Loss | (Thailand) Khunsuk Sitchefboontham | Rajadamnern Stadium | Bangkok, Thailand | Decision | 5 | 3:00 |
| 2019-12-29 | Win | (Thailand) Sornkaw Puiplaninthong | Channel 7 Stadium | Bangkok, Thailand | Decision | 5 | 3:00 |
Defends Channel 7 Stadium -154 lbs title.
| 2019-11-17 | Loss | (Thailand) Sornkaw Puiplaninthong | Or.Tor.Gor3 Stadium | Nonthaburi province, Thailand | Decision | 5 | 3:00 |
| 2019-07-24 | Loss | (Brazil) Luis Cajaiba | Lumpinee Stadium | Bangkok, Thailand | Decision | 5 | 3:00 |
Lost Thailand -154 lbs title.
| 2019-04-30 | Loss | (France) Jimmy Vienot | Lumpinee Stadium | Bangkok, Thailand | Decision | 5 | 3:00 |
For the vacant Lumpinee Stadium Middleweight (160 lbs) title.
| 2019-03-30 | Loss | (China) Wang Chao | Wu Lin Feng 2019: WLF x Lumpinee - China vs Thailand | Zhengzhou, China | TKO (Punches) | 1 | 2:54 |
| 2019-01-10 | Win | (Brazil) Luis Cajaiba | Lumpinee Stadium | Bangkok, Thailand | Decision | 5 | 3:00 |
| 2018-11-30 | Win | (Brazil) Luis Cajaiba | Lumpinee Stadium | Bangkok, Thailand | Decision | 5 | 3:00 |
Wins the vacant Lumpinee Stadium Super-welterweight (154 lb) title.
| 2018-10-07 | Win | (Russia) Ruslan Ataev | Muay Thai Super Champ | Bangkok, Thailand | Decision | 3 | 3:00 |
| 2018-08-08 | Win | (Thailand) Avatar Tor.Morsri | | Thailand | Decision | 5 | 3:00 |
Defends Thailand -154 lbs title.
| 2018-05-22 | Loss | (Morocco) Youssef Boughanem | Lumpinee Stadium | Bangkok, Thailand | TKO | 4 | |
For the vacant Lumpinee Stadium Middleweight (160 lbs) title.
| 2018-04-28 | Win | (Thailand) Sorgraw Petchyindee | Top King World Series 19, Final | Mahasarakham, Thailand | Decision | 3 | 3:00 |
| 2018-04-28 | Win | (Thailand) Kongnakornbarn Sor.kitrungroj | Top King World Series 19, Semi Final | Mahasarakham, Thailand | TKO (Knees) | 2 | |
| 2018-03-04 | Win | (Thailand) Petchmakkok EminentGym | Channel 7 Stadium | Bangkok, Thailand | KO (Right Elbow) | 4 | |
Wins Channel 7 Stadium -154 lbs title.
| 2018-01-14 | Win | (Thailand) Suayngam Pumpanmuang | Or.Tor.Gor3 Stadium | Nonthaburi province, Thailand | Decision | 5 | 3:00 |
| 2017-12-16 | Win | (Thailand) Petchmakkok EminentGym | | Thailand | Decision | 5 | 3:00 |
| 2017-09-09 | Loss | (Thailand) Arundej M16 | Lumpinee Stadium | Bangkok, Thailand | Decision | 5 | 3:00 |
| 2017-07-16 | Loss | (Thailand) Diesellek Phetjinda | Nonthaburi Stadium | Nonthaburi province, Thailand | KO (Right Elbow) | 4 | |
| 2017-05-06 | Win | (Thailand) Sangsakda Sitjamew | Lumpinee Stadium | Bangkok, Thailand | KO | 3 | |
| 2017-04-08 | Win | (Australia) Chadd Collins | Lumpinee Stadium | Bangkok, Thailand | Decision | 5 | 3:00 |
| 2016-09-10 | Loss | (Thailand) Diesellek Aoodonmuang | Lumpinee Stadium | Bangkok, Thailand | KO | 4 | |
| 2016-08-22 | Win | (Thailand) Diesellek Aoodonmuang | | Krasang District, Thailand | KO | 4 | |
| 2016-07-09 | Win | (Thailand) Sang-Uthai Sor.Jor.Piek-Uthai | Lumpinee Stadium | Bangkok, Thailand | Decision | 5 | 3:00 |
| 2016-05-01 | Win | (Thailand) Kwanchai Phetnirot | Rangsit Stadium | Rangsit, Thailand | Decision | 5 | 3:00 |
| 2016-03-20 | Loss | (Thailand) Duangsompong Nayok-A-Thasala | Jitmuangnon Stadium | Samut Sakhon, Thailand | KO | 4 | |
| 2016-02-14 | Win | (Thailand) Peemai Jitmuangnon | Rajadamnern Stadium | Bangkok, Thailand | Decision | 5 | 3:00 |
| 2016-01-17 | Loss | (Thailand) Suayngarm Pumpanmuang | Jitmuangnon Stadium | Samut Sakhon, Thailand | Decision | 5 | 3:00 |
| 2015-10-26 | Win | (Thailand) Koban Suranareegym | | Chiang Mai, Thailand | Decision | 5 | 3:00 |
| 2015-05-30 | Win | (Thailand) Adelton Sor.Kiewsuk | Omnoi Stadium | Samut Sakhon, Thailand | Decision | 5 | 3:00 |
| 2014 | Loss | (Thailand) Chanajon P.K.Saenchaimuaythaigym | Omnoi Stadium - Isuzu Cup | Samut Sakhon, Thailand | Decision | 5 | 3:00 |
Legend: Win Loss Draw/No contest Notes
