= Rafael Fiziev =

Azerbaijani mixed martial artist (born 1993)

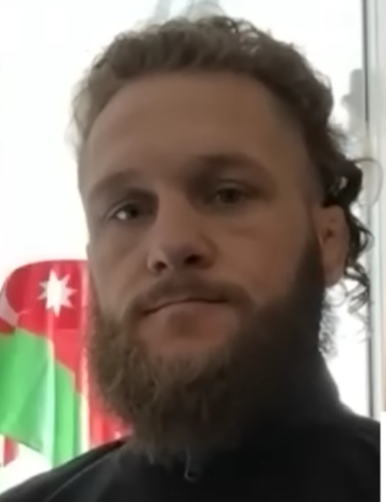
- Born: March 5, 1993 (age 33); Korday, Kazakhstan
- Nickname: Ataman
- Nationality: Azerbaijani (since 2021); Kyrgyzstani (until 2021)
- Height: 5 ft 8 in (1.73 m)
- Weight: 155 lb (70 kg; 11 st 1 lb)
- Division: Lightweight (2015–present)
- Reach: 71 1/2 in (182 cm)
- Style: Muay Thai
- Fighting out of: Deerfield Beach, Florida, U.S.
- Team: Phuket Top Team (2015–2017); Tiger Muay Thai (2017–present); Kill Cliff FC (2021–present)
- Rank: Blue belt in Brazilian Jiu-Jitsu under Bruninho Barbosa
- Years active: 2015–present

Kickboxing record
- Total: 47
- Wins: 39
- By knockout: 29
- Losses: 8

Mixed martial arts record
- Total: 19
- Wins: 14
- By knockout: 9
- By submission: 1
- By decision: 4
- Losses: 5
- By knockout: 3
- By decision: 2

Other information
- Occupation: Police Officer
- Notable school: Police Academy of Kyrgyzstan
- Mixed martial arts record from Sherdog

Rafael Fiziev (born March 5, 1993) is an Azerbaijani professional mixed martial artist and former Muay Thai fighter. He currently competes in the Lightweight division of the Ultimate Fighting Championship (UFC). As of October 31, 2026, he is #13 in the Meta UFC lightweight rankings.

== Early life ==
Fiziev was born in Korday, Kazakhstan, to an Azerbaijani father who was an undercover police officer and a Russian mother. When he was a child, Fiziev's family moved to Bishkek, Kyrgyzstan.

When he was a child, Fiziev's father bought him and his cousins boxing gloves and told them to spar. Initially, he did not enjoy sparring, and it was not until he changed schools that Fiziev took up Muay Thai at the age of 11 due to being bullied. While he concentrated on Muay Thai growing up, he also took up several other combat sports including combat sambo, boxing, Jiu Jitsu, and wrestling. When switching from Muay Thai to MMA, he says learning the grappling was the toughest part but his striking and standup required adjusting as well.

Fiziev worked as an undercover police officer but resigned after realising he would not make it to the level he wanted to. As a poor Muay Thai fighter in Thailand, he would attend Buddhist temples to survive off of bananas and pineapples.

== Muay Thai career ==
On April 29, 2016, Fiziev participated in the Toyota Marathon Tournament. In the quarter-finals he defeated Ruslan Rybakov by decision. In the semi-finals he knocked out Phakhow Darbphong 191. In Final he faced Sorgraw Petchyindee Academy who defeated him by decision.

Fiziev entered the 2017 Toyota Marathon 154 lb tournament as well, defeating Detrit Sathian Gym by decision in the semifinal. In the final he rematched Sorgraw Petchyindee Academy. He lost again by decision but went viral on social media in the process due to the impressive lean back defensive technique he displayed.

On April 21, 2017, Fiziev faced former Lumpinee Stadium champion Yodpayak Sitsongpeenong at a Muay Xtreme event in Bangkok, Thailand. Fiziev won the fight by knockout in the second round.

On September 22, 2017, Fiziev faced Leyton Collimore at Phoenix FC 3 in London, England. He was defeated by unanimous decision.

== Mixed martial arts career ==
=== Early career ===
Fiziev made his professional MMA debut in 2015. He fought in Asian regional promotions such as ROAD FC and the American promotion Titan FC before he signed with UFC, achieving an undefeated 6-0 record.

=== Ultimate Fighting Championship ===
In his promotional debut, Fiziev faced Magomed Mustafaev on April 20, 2019, at UFC Fight Night 149. He lost the fight by first-round technical knockout.

Fiziev next faced Alex White on October 26, 2019, at UFC on ESPN+ 20. He won the fight via unanimous decision.

Fiziev faced Marc Diakiese, replacing Alan Patrick on July 19, 2020, at UFC Fight Night 172. He won the fight via unanimous decision. This fight earned him the Fight of the Night award.

On August 5, 2020, Fiziev announced on his social media that he had signed a new, four-fight contract with the UFC.

He was scheduled to face Renato Moicano on November 28, 2020, at UFC on ESPN: Blaydes vs. Lewis. However, Moicano pulled out on November 28 after testing positive for COVID-19 and the bout was rescheduled for UFC 256. Fiziev won the fight via TKO in the first round. This win earned him his first Performance of the Night award.

Fiziev faced Bobby Green on August 7, 2021, at UFC 265. He won the fight via unanimous decision. This fight earned him the Fight of the Night award.

He faced Brad Riddell at UFC on ESPN 31 on December 4, 2021. He won the fight via knockout in round three. This win earned him the Performance of the Night award.

Fiziev was scheduled to face Rafael dos Anjos on February 19, 2022, at UFC Fight Night 201. However, the bout was postponed to UFC 272 due to visa issues with Fiziev. One week before the event, Fiziev was again forced to withdraw due to testing positive for COVID-19 and was replaced by Renato Moicano. The bout was rescheduled the third time for UFC on ESPN 39 on July 9, 2022. Fiziev won the fight via knockout in round five. This win earned him the Performance of the Night award.

Fiziev faced former UFC Interim Lightweight Champion Justin Gaethje on March 18, 2023, at UFC 286. He lost the back-and-forth fight via majority decision. This fight earned him the Fight of the Night bonus award.

Fiziev faced former KSW Lightweight Champion and KSW Featherweight Champion Mateusz Gamrot on September 23, 2023, at UFC Fight Night 228. He lost the fight via technical knockout due to knee injury in round two.

Fiziev was reportedly going to face Mateusz Gamrot in a rematch on February 1, 2025 at UFC Fight Night 250. However, the bout was never officially scheduled for the event.

Replacing an injured Dan Hooker, Fiziev faced Justin Gaethje in a rematch on March 8, 2025 at UFC 313. He lost the fight by unanimous decision. This fight earned him another Fight of the Night award.

Fiziev faced Ignacio Bahamondes on June 21, 2025 at UFC on ABC 8. He won the fight by unanimous decision.

Fiziev was scheduled to face Charles Oliveira in the main event on October 11, 2025, at UFC Fight Night 261. However, Fiziev withdrew from the bout due to a knee injury and was replaced by Mateusz Gamrot.

Fiziev faced Maurício Ruffy on February 1, 2026 at UFC 325. He lost the fight by technical knockout in the second round.

Fiziev faced Manuel Torres on June 27, 2026 in the main event at UFC Fight Night 280. He won the fight by knockout via a spinning wheel kick and punches in the second round. This fight earned him a $100,000 Performance of the Night award.

== Personal life ==
Outside of fighting, Fiziev enjoys blacksmithing with an emphasis on cold steel arms. Fiziev is a devout Shia Muslim and his walkout song is a Latmiya.

In 2021, Fiziev revealed he would no longer be representing his home country of Kyrgyzstan during his UFC bouts due to the country's religious discrimination of Shia Muslims. He has since made Phuket, Thailand his primary residence and represents Azerbaijan when fighting.

== Fighting style ==
Fiziev is known for his explosive and technical Muay Thai striking, shaped by years of training and later coaching at Tiger Muay Thai in Thailand. He fights from an orthodox stance but frequently switches stances mid-fight to control angles and adjust his power shots. His striking is built around crisp combinations, heavy body kicks, and fast counters, particularly when opponents overcommit or try to close distance.

His defensive movement is a key feature of his style — Fiziev became widely known after slipping a head kick with a motion that resembled the “Matrix” movie scene, a moment that went viral online. While he prefers to keep the fight standing, Fiziev has shown competent takedown defense and quick scrambles when tested. His forward pressure, cardio, and shot selection make him one of the more dynamic strikers in the lightweight division, often blending power and technique with flair.

== Championships and accomplishments ==
=== Mixed martial arts ===
- Ultimate Fighting Championship
  - Fight of the Night (Four times) vs. Marc Diakiese, Bobby Green, and Justin Gaethje (x2)
  - Performance of the Night (Four times) vs. Renato Moicano, Brad Riddell, Rafael dos Anjos and Manuel Torres
  - UFC Honors Awards
    - 2023: President's Choice Fight of the Year Nominee vs. Justin Gaethje 1
  - UFC.com Awards
    - 2023: Ranked #7 Fight of the Year vs. Justin Gaethje 1
- Combat Press
  - 2021 Breakout Fighter of the Year
- MMA Junkie
  - 2023 March Fight of the Month vs. Justin Gaethje
  - 2025 March Fight of the Month vs. Justin Gaethje
- Sherdog
  - 2023 Round of the Year vs. Justin Gaethje
- Bleacher Report
  - 2023 #3 Ranked UFC Fight of the Year vs. Justin Gaethje at UFC 286

=== Muay Thai ===
- Kyrgyz Muaythai Federation
  - 3x Kyrgyzstan Muay Thai Champion (2007, 2008, and 2009)
- International Federation of Muaythai Associations
  - 2009 IFMA World Championships Junior (silver)
  - 2011 Kazakhstan National Champion
  - 2016 IFMA World Championships (B-class) -71 kg (bronze)
- World Muaythai Federation
  - 2010 WMF Intercontinental -63.5 kg Champion

== Mixed martial arts record ==
Professional record breakdown
19 matches	14 wins	5 losses
By knockout	9	3
By submission	1	0
By decision	4	2

Res.	Record	Opponent	Method	Event	Date	Round	Time	Location	Notes
Win	14–5	Manuel Torres	KO (spinning wheel kick and punches)	UFC Fight Night: Fiziev vs. Torres	June 27, 2026	2	0:15	Baku, Azerbaijan	Performance of the Night.
Loss	13–5	Maurício Ruffy	TKO (punches)	UFC 325	February 1, 2026	2	4:30	Sydney, Australia	
Win	13–4	Ignacio Bahamondes	Decision (unanimous)	UFC on ABC: Hill vs. Rountree Jr.	June 21, 2025	3	5:00	Baku, Azerbaijan	
Loss	12–4	Justin Gaethje	Decision (unanimous)	UFC 313	March 8, 2025	3	5:00	Las Vegas, Nevada, United States	Fight of the Night.
Loss	12–3	Mateusz Gamrot	TKO (knee injury)	UFC Fight Night: Fiziev vs. Gamrot	September 23, 2023	2	2:03	Las Vegas, Nevada, United States	
Loss	12–2	Justin Gaethje	Decision (majority)	UFC 286	March 18, 2023	3	5:00	London, England	Fight of the Night.
Win	12–1	Rafael dos Anjos	KO (punches)	UFC on ESPN: dos Anjos vs. Fiziev	July 9, 2022	5	0:18	Las Vegas, Nevada, United States	Performance of the Night.
Win	11–1	Brad Riddell	KO (spinning wheel kick)	UFC on ESPN: Font vs. Aldo	December 4, 2021	3	2:20	Las Vegas, Nevada, United States	Performance of the Night.
Win	10–1	Bobby Green	Decision (unanimous)	UFC 265	August 7, 2021	3	5:00	Houston, Texas, United States	Fight of the Night.
Win	9–1	Renato Moicano	KO (punches)	UFC 256	December 12, 2020	1	4:05	Las Vegas, Nevada, United States	Performance of the Night.
Win	8–1	Marc Diakiese	Decision (unanimous)	UFC Fight Night: Figueiredo vs. Benavidez 2	July 18, 2020	3	5:00	Abu Dhabi, United Arab Emirates	Fight of the Night.
Win	7–1	Alex White	Decision (unanimous)	UFC Fight Night: Maia vs. Askren	October 26, 2019	3	5:00	Kallang, Singapore	
Loss	6–1	Magomed Mustafaev	TKO (spinning back kick and punches)	UFC Fight Night: Overeem vs. Oleinik	April 20, 2019	1	1:26	Saint Petersburg, Russia	
Win	6–0	Nurzhan Tutaev	KO (body kick)	Titan FC 51	December 21, 2018	2	0:51	Almaty, Kazakhstan	
Win	5–0	Nandin-Erdene Munguntsooj	KO (head kick and punches)	Road FC 45	December 23, 2017	1	0:58	Seoul, South Korea	Catchweight (158 lb) bout.
Win	4–0	Kim Seung-yeon	TKO (knees and punches)	Road FC 39	June 10, 2017	1	4:23	Seoul, South Korea	
Win	3–0	Suraj Bahadur	TKO (punches)	Primal FC: Dark Moon Rising	March 24, 2017	1	2:30	Phuket, Thailand	Catchweight (159 lb) bout.
Win	2–0	Gunduz Nabiev	Submission (rear naked choke)	MMA Kyrgyzstan: Boroda	October 10, 2016	1	3:40	Bishkek, Kyrgyzstan	
Win	1–0	Sam Bastin	KO (flying knee)	W.I.N FC	July 18, 2015	1	N/A	Shenzhen, China	Lightweight debut.

== Muay Thai record ==
Professional Muay Thai record (incomplete)
39 wins, 29 wins by KO, 8 losses
Date	Result	Opponent	Event	Location	Method	Round	Time
2017-09-22	Loss	(Barbados) Leyton Collymore	Phoenix FC 3	London, England	Decision (Unanimous)	3	3:00
2017-04-21	Win	(Thailand) Yodpayak Sitsongpeenong	Muay Xtreme	Bangkok, Thailand	KO (Right Cross)	2	
2017-01-27	Loss	(Thailand) Sorgraw Petchyindee	Muay Thai Marathon: Hilux Revo and Karavan CPF, Final Stadium	Phitsanulok, Thailand	Decision	3	3:00
Muay Thai Marathon: Hilux Revo Super Welterweight Tournament Final.
2017-01-27	Win	(Thailand) Dechrid Sathian Muaythai Gym	Muay Thai Marathon: Hilux Revo and Karavan CPF, Final Stadium	Phitsanulok, Thailand	Decision	3	3:00
Muay Thai Marathon: Hilux Revo Super Welterweight Tournament Semifinal.
2016-12-30	Win	(Thailand) Oasis	Bangla Boxing Stadium	Patong, Thailand	KO (Right Cross)	2	
Wins Bangla Boxing Stadium title.
2016-11-	Win	(Algeria) Jilas	Bangla Boxing Stadium, Final	Patong, Thailand	KO (Flying Knee)	2	
2016-11-	Win	(Russia) Michael	Bangla Boxing Stadium, Semi-final	Patong, Thailand	TKO (Body Kick)	1	
2016-04-29	Loss	(Thailand) Sorgraw Petchyindee	Muay Thai Marathon: Hilux Revo and Karavan CPF, First Stadium	Chonburi, Thailand	Decision	3	3:00
Muay Thai Marathon: Hilux Revo Super Welterweight Tournament Final.
2016-04-29	Win	(Thailand) Yoddiesel Lukjaomaesaitong	Muay Thai Marathon: Hilux Revo and Karavan CPF, First Stadium	Chonburi, Thailand	KO (Right Cross)	2	
Muay Thai Marathon: Hilux Revo Super Welterweight Tournament Semifinal.
2016-04-29	Win	(Russia) Ruslan Rybakov	Muay Thai Marathon: Hilux Revo and Karavan CPF, First Stadium	Chonburi, Thailand	Decision	3	3:00
Muay Thai Marathon: Hilux Revo Super Welterweight Tournament Quarterfinal.
2016-04-01	Win	(Thailand) Wuttichai	Bangla Boxing Stadium	Patong, Thailand	KO (Spinning Back Kick)	2	
2016-02-03	Win	(Thailand) Teelek	Bangla Boxing Stadium	Patong, Thailand	KO (Punches)	2	
2015-12-27	Win	(China) A Kuang Rattanachai	Bangla Boxing Stadium	Patong, Thailand	KO (Punches)	1	
2015-12-27	Win	(Australia) Jack Keawpituk	Bangla Boxing Stadium	Patong, Thailand	KO (Overhand Right)	1	
2015-12-16	Win	(France) Damien Sit.Or	Bangla Boxing Stadium	Patong, Thailand	KO (Left Hook)	2	
2012-06-28	Win	(Kazakhstan) Rishat Livensho		Bishkek, Kyrgyzstan	Decision (Unanimous)	3	3:00
2010-05-08	Win	(Ukraine) Sergey Kulyaba		Mytishchi, Russia	Decision	3	3:00
Wins WMF Intercontinental Light Welterweight title.
Legend: Win Loss Draw/No contest Notes

Amateur Muay Thai record (incomplete)
Date	Result	Opponent	Event	Location	Method	Round	Time
2016-05-25	Loss	(Russia) Denis Kolotygin	IFMA World Championships 2016, Semi-final	Jonkoping, Sweden	TKO	3	
Wins 2016 IFMA World Championships (B-class) -71kg Bronze Medal.
2016-05-24	Win	(Lithuania) Martynas Jasiūnas	IFMA World Championships 2016, Quarter-final	Jonkoping, Sweden	Decision	3	
2016-05-	Win	(Mauritius) Facson Perrine	IFMA World Championships 2016, Round of 16	Jonkoping, Sweden	Decision (Unanimous)	3	
2016-05-	Win	(Portugal) Serjio Villa	IFMA World Championships 2016, Round of 32	Jonkoping, Sweden	Decision	3	
2011-09-21	Win	(Finland) Antero Hynynen	IFMA World Championships 2011	Tashkent, Uzbekistan	Decision	4	2:00
Legend: Win Loss Draw/No contest Notes
