= Yodpayak Sitsongpeenong =

Thai Muay Thai kickboxer (born 1993)

- Born: Woranat Ponnikom; February 25, 1993 (age 33); Maha Sarakham, Thailand
- Native name: ยอดพยัคฆ์ ศิษย์สองพี่น้อง
- Other names: Tua, Yodpayak Kaoklaigym
- Nationality: Thai
- Height: 1.77 m (5 ft 9 1/2 in)
- Weight: 70 kg (154 lb; 11 st); 72.5 kg (160 lb; 11.42 st)
- Division: Super Welterweight; Middleweight
- Style: Muay Thai
- Stance: Orthodox
- Fighting out of: Bangkok, Thailand
- Team: Sitsongpeenong Muaythai
- Trainer: Anuaysil Bunphengsri "Monlit Sitphodaeng", Jakkrit Fairtex, Tong Sitsongpeenong
- Years active: 12 (2004–present)

Kickboxing record
- Total: 182
- Wins: 139
- Losses: 41
- Draws: 2

Other information
- Website: www.sitsongpeenong.com
- Last updated on: June 21, 2016

Yodpayak Sitsongpeenong (Thai: ยอดพยัคฆ์ ศิษย์สองพี่น้อง, Thai pronunciation: [jɔ̂ːt.pʰaják sìt.sɔ̌ːŋpʰîːnɔ́ːŋ]; born February 25, 1993) is a Thai Muay Thai kickboxer. As of June 2016, he is ranked the #3 Middleweight by Rajadamnern Stadium, #3 Super Welterweight by Thailand PAT, and #5 Super Welterweight by World Boxing Council Muaythai.

== Biography and career ==
Yodpayak Sitsongpeenong was born as Woranat Ponnikom in Maha Sarakham in Northeastern (Isan) region of Thailand on February 25, 1993. He had his first fight at the age of 11 in 2004.

On 11 January, he won against Jaenrop Pumphanmuang via third-round technical knock out in a bout at 159 lb.

On 26 July 2014, he beat Peemai Jitmuangnon in a five-round decision to win the vacant Omnoi Stadium super welterweight title at 154 lb.

On 18 July 2015, he defended his Omnoi Stadium title against Fahmongkol SJ Danrayong.

On 20 October 2015, he fought Sirimongkol Sitanupap for both the vacant Thailand PAT super welterweight title and for the vacant Lumpinee Stadium super welterweight title, but loss to a five-round decision.

On 16 February 2016, he fought Sirimongkol Sitniwatfor the Lumpinee Stadium super welterweight title and won after a five-round decision.

On 28, May, 2016, he fought Denpanom RR Keela Korat to defend his Omnoi Stadium title, but was not successful.

== Titles and achievements ==
- Lumpinee Stadium
  - 2016 Lumpinee Stadium Super-welterweight (154 lb) Champion
- Siam Omnoi Stadium
  - 2014 Omnoi Stadium Super Welterweight Champion (154 lb)

== Fight record ==
Kickboxing record
139 Wins, 41 Losses, 2 Draws
Date	Result	Opponent	Event	Location	Method	Round	Time
2024-10-10	Loss	(Turkey) Burak Poyraz	Rajadamnern Stadium	Bangkok, Thailand	Decision	3	3:00
2018-05-20	Loss	(Israel) Ilya Grad	Real Hero Muay Thai, Semifinals	Bangkok, Thailand	Decision	1	5:00
2018-05-20	Win	(Brazil) Thiago Goulate	Real Hero Muay Thai, Quarterfinals	Bangkok, Thailand	Decision	1	5:00
2018-01-26	Loss	(Thailand) Sorgraw Petchyindee	True4U Muaymanwansuk, Rangsit Stadium	Thailand	Decision	5	3:00
2017-08-07	Loss	(Belgium) Youssef Boughanem	Sor.Sommai Fight, Rajadamnern Stadium	Bangkok, Thailand	KO	5	
For the Rajadamnern Stadium Middleweight Title (160lbs)
2017-04-21	Loss	(Kyrgyzstan) Rafael Fiziev	MX MUAY XTREME	Bangkok, Thailand	KO (Right Cross)	2	
2017-03-17	Win	(China) Lang Ting Gui	MX MUAY XTREME	Bangkok, Thailand	KO (Right Elbow)	1	0:26
2017-01-27	Win	(Republic of Ireland) James Heelan	MX MUAY XTREME	Bangkok, Thailand	KO (Right Elbow)	2	
2016-12-23	Win	(Thailand) Farsura Windysport	Sangmorakot Fight, Lumpinee Stadium	Bangkok, Thailand	Decision	5	3:00
Defends the Lumpinee Stadium Super-welterweight (154 lb) title.
2016-08-27	Loss	(Russia) Magomed Magomedov	EM Legend 14	Chengdu, China	TKO	2	
2016-09-17	Loss	(France) Jimmy Vienot	Wicked One Duel	Paris, France	Decision	5	3:00
2016-08-27	Win	(Russia) Ievgenii Kurovskoy	Topking World Series	Chengdu, China	Decision	3	3:00
2016-07-09	Win	(Brazil) Jose Neto	EM Legend 10	Chengdu, China	KO	1	
2016-05-28	Loss	(Thailand) Denpanom RR Keela Korat	Omnoi Stadium	Bangkok, Thailand	Decision	5	3:00
Loses Omnoi Stadium Super Welterweight Title
2016-03-27	Win	(United States) Gladstone Martin Allen	Workpoint Super Muaythai	Bangkok, Thailand	Decision	3	3:00
2016-03-12	Win	(Russia) Mogomed Zaynukov	Workpoint Super Muaythai	Bangkok, Thailand	Decision	3	3:00
2016-02-16	Win	(Thailand) Sirimongkol Sitniwat	Sangmorakot Fight, Lumpinee Stadium	Bangkok, Thailand	Decision	5	3:00
Wins the Lumpinee Stadium Super-welterweight (154 lb) title.
2016-01-24	Win	(Russia) Mogomed Zaynukov	Workpoint Super Muaythai	Bangkok, Thailand	Decision	3	3:00
2015-10-20	Loss	(Thailand) Sirimongkol Sitanupap	Sangmorakot Fight, Lumpinee Stadium	Bangkok, Thailand	Decision	5	3:00
For the vacant Lumpinee Stadium and Thailand Super Welterweight (154 lbs) titles.
2015-09-20	Loss	(Slovenia) Vladamir Konsky	Top King World Series	Vientiane, Laos	Decision	3	3:00
2015-07-18	Win	(Thailand) Fahmongkol SJ Danrayong	Omnoi Stadium	Bangkok, Thailand	Decision	5	3:00
Defends Omnoi Stadium Super Welterweight Title (154 lb)
2015-04-04	Loss	(Thailand) Sirimongkol Sitanupap	Omnoi Stadium	Thailand	Decision	5	3:00
2015-02-28	Win	(Thailand) Teedet Sitjakoong	Omnoi Stadium	Thailand	KO	3	—N/a
2015-01-24	Win	(Thailand) Tengnueng Sitjaesairoong	Omnoi Stadium	Thailand	Decision	5	3:00
2014-11-11	Lost	(Thailand) Sirimongkol Sitanupap	Omnoi Stadium	Thailand	Decision	5	3:00
2014-08-30	Draw	(Thailand) Dejrit Poptheeratham	Omnoi Stadium	Thailand	Decision	5	3:00
2014-07-26	Win	(Thailand) Peemai Jitmuangnon	Omnoi Stadium	Bangkok, Thailand	Decision	5	3:00
Wins vacant Omnoi Stadium Super Welterweight Title (154 lb)
2014-06-14	Lost	(France) Samy Sana	Best of Siam 5	Paris, France	Decision	5	3:00
2014-04-12	Win	(Thailand) Thepsutin Pumphanmuang	Omnoi Stadium	Thailand	Decision	5	3:00
2014-03-15	Win	(Thailand) Charnchai Sitithisukato	Omnoi Stadium	Thailand	Decision	5	3:00
2014-02-08	Lost	(Thailand) Eakchanachai Kaewsamrit	Omnoi Stadium	Thailand	Decision	5	3:00
2014-01-11	Win	(Thailand) Jaenrop Pumphanmuang	Omnoi Stadium	Thailand	TKO	3	—N/a
2013-11-16	Lost	(Thailand) Talaytong Sor. Thanapetch		Bangkok, Thailand	Decision	5	3:00
2013-10-12	Win	(Thailand) Chanajon P.K. Saenchai Muaythaigym	Omnoi Stadium	Thailand	Decision	5	3:00
2013-09-26	Win	(Thailand) Wacharalek Or. Kwanmuang		Thailand	Decision	5	3:00
2013-08-23	Win	(Thailand) Sampson S. Sompong		Thailand	Decision	5	3:00
2013-07-20	Win	(Thailand) Kwanchai Petchniroj		Thailand	Decision	5	3:00
2013-06-21	Lost	(France) Djime Coulibaly	Best of Siam 4	Paris, France	Decision	5	3:00
2013-04-12	Win	(Thailand) Manasak Sitniwat		Nakhon Ratchasima, Thailand	Decision	5	3:00
2013-03-29	Win	(Thailand) Dejrit Poptheeratham	Toyota Marathon	Kanchanaburi, Thailand	Decision	5	3:00
2013-03-29	Win	(Thailand) Saengchan Tor Manothammaraksa	Toyota Marathon	Kanchanaburi, Thailand	Decision	5	3:00
2013-02-23	Win	(Portugal) Paulo Santos	THAI FIGHT Extreme 2013: Muay Thai Day	Ayutthaya, Thailand	KO	1	
2013-01-	Win	(Thailand) Wacharalek Or. Kwanmuang	Omnoi Stadium	Thailand	Decision	5	3:00
Legend: Win Loss Draw/No contest Notes

== See also ==
- List of male kickboxers
