= Luis Cajaiba =

Brazilian Muay Thai fighter

- Born: 1996 (age 29–30); Vitória da Conquista, Brazil
- Other names: Caja; Cajaiba PhuketFightClub
- Height: 178 cm (5 ft 10 in)
- Weight: 70 kg (154 lb; 11 st)
- Division: Welterweight; Featherweight
- Style: Muay Thai
- Stance: Orthodox
- Fighting out of: Phuket, Thailand
- Team: Phuket Fight Club; SRG Thai Boxing
- Years active: 2014 - present

Kickboxing record
- Total: 84
- Wins: 68
- Losses: 16

Luis Cajaiba is a Brazilian Muay Thai fighter. He is the former WBC Muaythai World Welterweight champion.

== Muay Thai career ==
In 2018 Luis fought Talaytong Sor.Thanaphet for the For the vacant Lumpinee Stadium Super-welterweight (154 lb) title. He lost a decision.

In June 2019, Luis fought Chadd Collins for the vacant WBC Muaythai World Welterweight title. He won the fight by decision.

In July 2019, Cajaiba fought Talaythong Chor Thanapetch for the Thailand Super Welterweight Muay thai title. He won the fight by decision.

In September 2019, Cajaiba fought Valentin Thibaut for the WBC Muay Thai Diamond Super Welterweight title. He lost the fight by decision.

Cajaiba was scheduled to rematch the reigning Lumpini Stadium 160 lb champion Sorgraw Petchyindee at Road to ONE 6: WSS. The event got cancelled.

In 2020 Luis captured the IMC Super Welterweight title in a decision win against Wanchalerm NuanthongSnookerKluahrae1T.

In 2022 Luis fought Rungrat Pumpanmuang for the For the vacant Omnoi Stadium Super Welterweight (154 lb) Championship. He lost by decision.

In 2023 Luis fought Kongthailand For the vacant Lumpinee Stadium Super-welterweight (154 lb) title, lost by decision.

In 2023 Luis won the vacant WBC Muay Thai International Super-welterweight (154 lb) title against Hugh O'Donell and successfully defended it against Jonathan Aiulu in 2024.

In 2024 Luis fought Kongthailand in a rematch For the vacant WBC Muaythai World Super-welterweight (154 lb) title. He lost by knockout.

== Championships and awards ==
- Rebellion Muaythai
  - 2026 Rebellion Muay Thai Welterweight (66.67 kg) Champion
- World Boxing Council Muay Thai
  - 2019 WBC Muay Thai World 147 lb Champion
  - 2023 WBC Muay Thai International Super-welterweight (154 lb) Champion
  - 2026 WBC Muay Thai Diamond Super-welterweight (154 lb) Champion
- International Muaythai Council
  - 2020 IMC World Super Welterweight Champion
- Professional Boxing Association of Thailand (PAT)
  - 2019 Thailand 154 lb Champion

== Muay Thai record ==
Professional Kickboxing Record
68 Wins, 16 Losses
Date	Result	Opponent	Event	Location	Method	Round	Time
2026-11-14	Win	(Turkey) Erdem Dincer	Rebellion MuayThai	Melbourne, Australia	Decision	5	3:00
Wins the Rebellion Muay Thai Welterweight Championship (66.67 kg) title.
2026-10-17	Win	(Thailand) Denkaosaen Wan Kong Ohm	Amazing Muay Thai Road to Rajadamnern x 1774 Muay Thai Series	Sydney, Australia	KO (Knee)	1	
2026-08-15	Win	(Thailand) Boonlert Sor.Boonmeerit	Muay Thai to the World x Rebellion	Melbourne, Australia	Decision (Unanimous)	3	3:00
2026-06-30	Win	(Thailand) Sitthichai Sitsongpeenong	WBC Muay Thai, Rajadamnern Stadium	Bangkok, Thailand	Decision (Unanimous)	5	3:00
Wins the WBC Muay Thai Diamond Super Welterweight (154 lbs) title.
2025-03-29	Loss	(Australia) Damon Nelson	Iron Lion Promotions SCC 21	Melbourne, Australia	Decision (Unanimous)	5	3:00
2024-06-16	Loss	(Thailand) Kongthailand Kiatnavy	1774 MuayThai Series	Sydney, Australia	TKO (Referee stoppage)	3	
For the vacant WBC Muaythai World Super-welterweight (154 lb) title.
2024-05-04	Win	(Australia) Damon Nelson	Soot Raaeng Geert Fight Night	Sydney, Australia	Decision (Unanimous)	5	3:00
2024-02-17	Win	(Australia) Jonathan Aiulu	1774 Muaythai Series	Sydney, Australia	Decision (Unanimous)	5	3:00
Defends WBC Muay Thai International Super-welterweight (154 lb) title.
2023-11-11	Win	(Australia) Hugh O'Donell	1774 Muaythai Series	Sydney, Australia	Decision (Unanimous)	5	3:00
Wins the vacant WBC Muay Thai International Super-welterweight (154 lb) title.
2023-05-06	Loss	(Thailand) Kongthailand Kiatnavy	LWC Super Champ, Lumpinee Stadium	Bangkok, Thailand	Decision (Unanimous)	5	3:00
For the vacant Lumpinee Stadium Super-welterweight (154 lb) title.
2023-03-25	Win	(Thailand) Rungrat Pumpanmuang	LWC Super Champ, Lumpinee Stadium	Bangkok, Thailand	Decision	3	3:00
2023-01-21	Win	(Cambodia) Thai Rithy	LWC Super Champ, Lumpinee Stadium	Bangkok, Thailand	Decision	3	3:00
2022-11-18	Loss	(Thailand) Yodwicha Por Boonsit	Rajadamnern World Series - Semi Final	Bangkok, Thailand	Decision (Unanimous)	3	3:00
2022-10-14	Win	(Iran) Reza VenumMuaythai	Rajadamnern World Series - Group Stage	Bangkok, Thailand	Decision (Unanimous)	3	3:00
2022-09-09	Win	(Thailand) Saenpon Petchpachara	Rajadamnern World Series - Group Stage	Bangkok, Thailand	Decision (Unanimous)	3	3:00
2022-08-05	Win	(Thailand) Satanfah Sitsongpeenong	Rajadamnern World Series - Group Stage	Bangkok, Thailand	Decision (Majority)	3	3:00
2022-04-16	Loss	(Thailand) Rungrat Pumpanmuang	Suekjaomuaythai, Omnoi Stadium	Samut Sakhon, Thailand	Decision (Unanimous)	5	3:00
For the vacant Omnoi Stadium Super Welterweight (154 lb) Championship.
2022-02-26	Win	(Thailand) Talaytong Sor.Thanaphet	Muaythai Lumpinee TKO, Lumpinee Stadium	Bangkok, Thailand	Decision	5	3:00
2022-01-30	Loss	(Thailand) Rungrat Pumpanmuang	Chang MuayThai Kiatpetch Amarin Super Fight, Rajadamnern Stadium	Bangkok, Thailand	Decision	5	3:00
2021-12-30	Win	(Thailand) Bangpleenoi PetchyindeeAcademy	Muay Thai SAT Super Fight WiteetinThai	Phuket, Thailand	Decision	5	3:00
2021-10-31	Win	(Thailand) Sornkaw Sitkamnanleu	Chang MuayThai Kiatpetch Amarin Super Fight + Moradok Kon Thai	Buriram province, Thailand	Decision	5	3:00
2021-03-27	Loss	(Thailand) Satanfah Rachanon	WSS Fights, World Siam Stadium	Bangkok, Thailand	KO (Right Elbow)	4	
2021-02-28	Win	(Thailand) Sorgraw Petchyindee Academy	WSS Fights, World Siam Stadium	Bangkok, Thailand	Decision	5	3:00
2020-11-22	Win	(Thailand) Guanyu AyothayaFightGym	Muay Thai Super Champ	Bangkok, Thailand	Decision	3	3:00
2020-09-22	Win	(Thailand) Wanchalerm NuanthongSnookerKluahrae1T	Rangsit Stadium	Rangsit, Thailand	Decision	5	3:00
Wins IMC Super Welterweight title.
2019-09-24	Loss	(France) Valentin Thibaut	Lumpinee Stadium	Bangkok, Thailand	Decision	5	3:00
For the WBC Muay Thai Diamond 154 lb title.
2019-07-24	Win	(Thailand) Talaytong Sor.Thanaphet	Lumpinee Stadium	Bangkok, Thailand	Decision	5	3:00
Wins Thailand 154 lb title.
2019-06-18	Win	(Australia) Chadd Collins	Petchnumnoi + Prestige Fight Lumpinee Stadium	Bangkok, Thailand	Decision	5	3:00
Wins the vacant WBC Muay Thai World 147 lb title.
2019-04-27	Win	(Thailand) Arandet M16	Omnoi Stadium	Bangkok, Thailand	Decision	5	3:00
2019-02-17	Win	(Thailand) Saenpol	Lumpinee Stadium	Bangkok, Thailand	Decision	5	3:00
2019-01-10	Loss	(Thailand) Talaytong Sor.Thanaphet	Lumpinee Stadium	Bangkok, Thailand	Decision	5	3:00
2018-11-30	Loss	(Thailand) Talaytong Sor.Thanaphet	Lumpinee Stadium	Bangkok, Thailand	Decision	5	3:00
For the vacant Lumpinee Stadium Super-welterweight (154 lb) title.
2018-11-04	Loss	(Thailand) Rambo Pet.Por.Tor.Or	Muay Thai Super Champ	Bangkok, Thailand	Decision	3	3:00
2018-09-25	Win	(Thailand) Chaidet M-16	Lumpinee Stadium	Bangkok, Thailand	Decision	5	3:00
2018-08-25	Loss	(Thailand) Satanfah Rachanon	Thai Fight	Bangkok, Thailand	Decision	3	3:00
2018-07-22	Loss	(Thailand) Rungrat Pumpanmuang	Muay Thai Super Champ	Bangkok, Thailand	Decision	3	3:00
2018-07-01	Win	(Thailand) Samingdet Dekfaifah	Muay Thai Super Champ	Bangkok, Thailand	KO (Elbow)	2	
2018-04-28	Loss	(Thailand) Sibmuen Sitchefboontham	All Star Fight 3	Bangkok, Thailand	Decision	5	3:00
2018-03-17	Loss	(Thailand) Singmanee Kaewsamrit	Miracle Muay Thai Festival, Semi Final	Thailand	Decision	5	3:00
2018-03-17	Win	Pavel	Miracle Muay Thai Festival, Quarter Final	Thailand	Decision	5	3:00
2017-12-26	Win	(Thailand) Lukton Pumphanmuang	Lumpinee Stadium	Bangkok, Thailand	Decision	5	3:00
2017-11-10	Win	(Singapore) Bardon MewMuaythai	Lumpinee Stadium	Bangkok, Thailand	Decision	5	3:00
2017-06-16	Win	(Thailand) Beckham Tanaimichel	Lumpinee Stadium	Bangkok, Thailand	KO (Right elbow)	2	
2016-09-24	Win	(Brazil) Cadu Portela	Top Thai Brasil V	Brazil	Decision	5	3:00
2016-08-07	Win	(Brazil) Paulo Tiago	Heart Of Fighters II	Brazil	Decision	3	3:00
2016-05-14	Loss	(Brazil) Wagner Victor	Epic Muaythai Brasil, Final	Sao Paulo, Brazil	Decision	5	3:00
2016-05-14	Win	(Brazil) Julio Lobo	Epic Muaythai Brasil, Semi Final	Sao Paulo, Brazil	Decision	5	3:00
2016-03-05	Win	(Brazil) Petros Cabelinho	Epic Muaythai Brasil 2, Final	Brazil	Decision	5	3:00
2016-03-05	Win	(Brazil) Samuel Matias	Epic Muaythai Brasil 2, Semi Final	Brazil	KO (Punches)	3	
2016-02-20	Win	(Brazil) Thalison "Monstrão"	Epic Muaythai Brasil 1, Semi Final	Brazil	Decision	5	3:00
2015-09	Win	(Brazil) Julio Lobo	Maximum Muay Thai 2	Brazil	Decision	5	3:00
2015-06-27	Win	(Brazil) Lukinhas "Pilha Fraca"		Brazil	Decision	5	3:00
2015-03-28	Win	(Brazil) Jonathan Ferreira		Brazil	Decision	5	3:00
2014-12-14	Draw	(Brazil) Leandro Duarte	King Thai	Brazil	Decision	3	3:00
Legend: Win Loss Draw/No contest Notes

== See also ==
- List of male kickboxers
