= Detrit Sathian Gym =

Thai Muay Thai kickboxer

- Born: Kittidet Nachaithong; 1990 (age 35–36); Khon Kaen, Thailand
- Other names: Dejrit Poptheeratham; Dechrid Sathian Muaythai Gym
- Nationality: Thai
- Height: 177 cm (5 ft 9 1/2 in)
- Weight: 70.3 kg (155 lb; 11 st)
- Division: Middleweight; Welterweight
- Style: Muay Thai
- Team: Venum Training Camp; Sathian Muaythai Gym; Poptheeratham
- Years active: 2011 – present

Kickboxing record
- Total: 123
- Wins: 89
- Losses: 28
- Draws: 6
- Last updated on: May 2, 2020

Detrit Sathian Gym (also spelled Dechrid, Dejrit; Thai: เดชฤทธิ์ เสถียรมวยไทยยิม) is a Thai Muay Thai kickboxer from the Khon Kaen province in Thailand. He is the IMC World Super Welterweight 154 lbs. Champion. Detrit is also a former WPMF World 147 lbs. Champion and interim WPMF World (160 lbs) Champion.

He spent his early years studying under Samart Payakaroon. He won his first world title in 2014 and won four additional titles after he transferred to Santhian Muay Thai training camp. He has compiled 175 professional matches including against big names of the sports such as Sasha Moisa and Sograw Petchyindee Academy.

In June 2019, Capitan Petchyindee Academy beat Detrit Santhian Muaythai Gym and won the vacant 154 lbs. Lumpinee Stadium Muay Thai World title.

In 2020, Detrit was ranked 11 super welterweight by WBC Muaythai.

As of September 2022, Detrit is ranked 5th in the Middleweight 72.575 kg (160 lbs) by the World Muaythai Organization (WMO).

== Titles and accomplishments ==
- LWC Super Champ
  - 2023 Global House Grand Prix 154 lbs. Tournament Champion
- International Muaythai Council
  - 2020 IMC World Super Welterweight 154 lbs. Champion
- IKC K9 Championship
  - 2019 IKC K9 World Middleweight 159 lbs. Champion
- International Professional Combat Council
  - 2019 IPCC Asian Champion Combat Council 154 lbs. 4-Man Tournament Champion
- World Professional Muaythai Federation
  - 2016 Interim WPMF World Middleweight 160 lbs. Champion
    - One successful title defense
  - 2014 WPMF World Welterweight 147 lbs. Champion
- Siam Omnoi Stadium
  - 2015 Isuzu Cup Tournament Runner-up

== Fight record ==
Muay Thai record
89 Wins, 28 Losses, 6 Draws
Date	Result	Opponent	Event	Location	Method	Round	Time
2026-10-05	Loss	(China) Han Wenbao	Zhijin International Combat Sports : China vs Thailand	Zhijin, China	KO (calf kick)	1	
2026-02-21	Win	(China) Yongkang Cui	Kunlun Fight World Championship	Beijing, China	KO/TKO	1	2:09
2024-11-09	Loss	(Iran) Arya Akbari	LWC Super Champ 69	Bangkok, Thailand	Decision		
2024-07-13	Win	(Morocco) Mohamed Atlas	LWC Super Champ, Lumpinee Stadium	Bangkok, Thailand	Decision (Unanimous)	5	3:00
2024-06-15	Loss	(China) Luo Chao	EM Legend 46	Chongqing, China	Ext.R Decision	4	3:00
2024-06-08	Win	(Sweden) Noah Alic	LWC Super Champ, Lumpinee Stadium	Bangkok, Thailand	KO (Punch)	1	
2024-04-27	Win	(Uganda) Umar Semata	Kunlun Fight 97, Qualifying Tournament Final	Beijing, China	Decision (Unanimous)	3	3:00
2024-04-27	Win	(Belgium) Sabri Ben Henia	Kunlun Fight 97, Qualifying Tournament Semifinals	Beijing, China	TKO	1	
2024-03-23	Win	(China) Run Zhang	Kunlun Fight 96	Tongling, China	Decision	3	3:00
2024-02-24	Loss	(Cambodia) Chhoeung Lvai	Bayon TV boxing	Phnom Penh, Cambodia	Decision	3	
2023-12-16	Win	(Germany) Aaron Born	LWC Super Champ, Lumpinee Stadium	Bangkok, Thailand	TKO (Referee stoppage)	1	
Global House Grand Prix 154lbs. Tournament Final.
2023-11-23	Loss	(Iran) Abolfazl Alipour	Kunlun Fight 93	Tongling, China	TKO (Doctor stoppage/shin cut)	3	0:33
2023-11-18	Win	(Iran) Hassan Vahdanirad	LWC Super Champ, Lumpinee Stadium	Bangkok, Thailand	Decision (Unanimous)	3	3:00
Global House Grand Prix 154lbs. Tournament Semi-Final.
2023-09-16	Win	(Morocco) Oussama El Kouche	LWC Super Champ, Lumpinee Stadium	Bangkok, Thailand	Decision (Unanimous)	3	3:00
Global House Grand Prix 154lbs. Tournament Quarter-Final.
2023-07-01	Win	(Spain) Nayanesh Ayman	Rajadamnern World Series - Group Stage	Bangkok, Thailand	Decision (Unanimous)	3	3:00
2022-11-12	Loss	(Australia) David Pennimpede	1774 Muaythai Series	Sydney, Australia	TKO	4	
2022-09-04	Loss	(Cambodia) Thoeun Theara	PNN Boxing	Phnom Penh, Cambodia	TKO	3	
2022-05-28	Win	(Brazil) Victor Hugo	Muay Hardcore	Bangkok, Thailand	Decision	3	3:00
2022-05-01	Win	(Australia) Jordan Fielding	Muay Thai Super Champ	Thailand	TKO	1	
2022-03-27	Win	(Italy) Luca Lombardo	Muay Thai Super Champ	Thailand	Decision		
2020-12-19	Win	(Spain) Nicolas Mendes	Max Muay Thai	Pattaya, Thailand	Decision	3	3:00
2020-08-09	Loss	(Thailand) Wanchalerm Uddonmuang	Blue Arena	Samut Prakan, Thailand	KO	3	
2020-01-17	Win	(Thailand) Wanchalerm Uddonmuang	Lumpinee Stadium	Bangkok, Thailand	TKO	4	
Wins the IMC World 154lbs. title.
2019-12-17	Loss	(Thailand) Wanchalerm Uddonmuang	Lumpinee Stadium	Bangkok, Thailand	KO	1	
For the WMO Super Welterweight World 154lbs. title.
2019-11-22	Win	(Republic of Ireland) Johnny FA Group	IKC K9 Championship, Lumpinee Stadium	Bangkok, Thailand	Decision	5	3:00
Wins the IKC K9 World 159lbs. title.
2019-08-24	Loss	(Spain) Nayanesh Ayman	THAI FIGHT Kham Chanod	Udon Thani, Thailand	KO	3	
2019-07-14	Win	(Iran) Keivan Soleimani	Super Champ Muay Thai	Bangkok, Thailand	Decision	3	3:00
2019-06-01	Loss	(Thailand) Capitan Petchyindee Academy	Lumpinee Stadium	Bangkok, Thailand	Decision	5	3:00
For the Lumpinee Stadium Super-welterweight (154 lbs) title.
2019-02-23	Win	(Russia) Salimkhan Ibragimov	Topking World Series TK28	Surat Thani, Thailand	TKO	3	
2018-02-10	Loss	(China) Han Feilong	Topking - EM Legend 30	China	KO (Left Hook)	3	1:05
2017-12-02	Win	(China) Han Feilong	EM Legend 26	China	Decision	3	3:00
2017-09-01	Win	(Thailand) Sorgraw Petchyindee	Rangsit Boxing Stadium	Thailand	Decision	5	3:00
2017-05-19	Win	(Sweden) Magnus Andersson	MX MUAY XTREME	Bangkok, Thailand	KO	1	
2017-03-17	Win	(Thailand) Capitan Petchyindee	Miracle Muay Thai Festival	Bangkok, Thailand	Decision	5	3:00
2017-02-24	Loss	(Thailand) Sorgraw Petchyindee	Rangsit Boxing Stadium	Thailand	Decision	5	3:00
2017-01-27	Loss	(Kyrgyzstan) Rafael Fiziev	Toyota Marathon, Semi Final	Phitsanulok, Thailand	Decision	3	3:00
2016-11-26	Win	(France) Expedito Valin	Millenium World Muaythai	Réunion, France	Decision	5	3:00
Defends the interim WPMF World 160lbs. title.
2016-07-27	Loss	(Thailand) Captain Petchyindee	Prince's Birthday	Bangkok, Thailand	Decision	5	3:00
For the WPMF World 160lbs. and Thailand 160lbs. title.
2016-06-24	Loss	(Thailand) Chamuaktong Fightermuaythai	Toyota Marathon, Final	Bangkok, Thailand	Decision	3	3:00
2016-06-24	Win	(Thailand) Manaowan Sitsongpeenong	Toyota Marathon, Semi Final	Bangkok, Thailand	KO	1	
2016-06-24	Win	(Thailand) Diesellek Petjinda	Toyota Marathon, Quarter Final	Bangkok, Thailand	Decision	3	3:00
2015-12-28	Win	(Iran) Abdolhossein Abbasi Sibak	Topking World Series TK8	Pattaya, Thailand	KO	2	
2015-10-03	Win	(Netherlands) Henri Van Opstal	Xtreme Muay Thai 2015	Macau	Decision	3	3:00
2015-09-20	Loss	(Belarus) Dmitry Varats	Topking World Series TK6	Vientiane, Laos	Decision	3	3:00
2015-08-11	Win	(Sweden) Tobias Kaewsamrit	Queen's Birthday Event, Rajamangala Stadium	Bangkok, Thailand	Decision	5	3:00
Wins the interim WPMF World 160lbs title.
2015-05-15	Win	(Thailand) Jaroenchai JpowerRoofSamui		Phuket, Thailand	KO	2	
2015-02-28	Loss	(Thailand) Rungrawee P.K.SaenchaiMuaythaiGym	Omnoi Stadium	Bangkok, Thailand	Decision	5	3:00
2015-01-10	Win	(Thailand) Teeded Sitjakong	Omnoi Stadium	Bangkok, Thailand	KO	3	
2014-10-04	Win	(Thailand) Kongnakornbarn Sor.Kitrungroj	Omnoi Stadium	Bangkok, Thailand	Decision	5	3:00
2014-10-04	Win	(Thailand) Changpuek MuaythaiAcademy	Omnoi Stadium	Bangkok, Thailand	Decision	5	3:00
2014-08-30	Draw	(Thailand) Yodpayak Sitsongpeenong	Omnoi Stadium	Bangkok, Thailand	Decision	5	3:00
2014-08-23	Win	(Thailand) Rungrawee P.K.SaenchaiMuaythaiGym	Omnoi Stadium	Bangkok, Thailand	Decision	5	3:00
2014-03-17	Win	(Thailand) Singmanee Kaewsamrit	Miracle Muay Thai	Ayutthaya, Thailand	Decision	3	3:00
Wins the WPMF World 147lbs. title.
2014-01-11	Win	(Thailand) Phetasawin Seatranferry	Omnoi Stadium	Bangkok, Thailand	Decision	5	3:00
2013-11-23	Loss	(Thailand) Sitthichai Sitsongpeenong	Muay Dee Vithee Thai	Bangkok, Thailand	TKO	1	
For the Thailand 147lbs. title.
2013-10-26	Win	(Australia) Mike 3000	Real Hero Muay Thai	Sydney, Australia	Decision	3	3:00
2013-03-29	Loss	(Thailand) Sitthichai Sitsongpeenong	Toyota Marathon	Kanchanaburi, Thailand	Decision	3	3:00
2013-03-29	Win	(Thailand) Yodpayak Sitsongpeenong	Toyota Marathon	Kanchanaburi, Thailand	Decision	5	3:00
2013-03-29	Win	(Thailand) Sirimongkol Sitanupap	Toyota Marathon	Kanchanaburi, Thailand	Decision	5	3:00
2012-12-15	Win	(Russia) Dmitri Ushkanov	Muaythai World Fighter Spirit	Bangkok, Thailand	TKO	2	
2012-11-22	Win	(France) Hichem Chaibi	Best of Siam 2	Paris, France	Decision	5	3:00
2011-03-11	Loss	(Thailand) Chok Eminentair	Lumpinee Stadium	Bangkok, Thailand	Decision	5	3:00
Legend: Win Loss Draw/No contest Notes

== Lethwei record ==
Professional Lethwei record
1 wins (1 (T)KOs), 1 losses, 0 draws
Date	Result	Opponent	Event	Location	Method	Round	Time
2019-04-14	Loss	(Myanmar) Too Too	Thingyan Fight Chitthu Myaing Park	Hpa An, Myanmar	KO	1	
2019-01-09	Win	(Myanmar) Phyan Thway	(27th) Karen New Year Celebration, Taung Ka Lay	Hpa-an, Myanmar	TKO (injury)	3	
Legend: Win Loss Draw/No contest Notes
