= Sorgraw Petchyindee Academy =

Muay Thai fighter

- Born: 1994 (age 31–32); Buriram Province, Thailand
- Other names: Maruay Sitjepond (มารวย ศิษย์เจ๊ปอนด์)
- Nationality: Thai
- Height: 180 cm (5 ft 11 in)
- Weight: 70 kg (154 lb; 11 st)
- Division: Featherweight
- Style: Muay Thai
- Stance: Orthodox
- Fighting out of: Bangkok, Thailand
- Team: Petcyhindee Academy

Sorgraw Petchyindee Academy (Thai: เซราะกราว เพชรยินดีอคาดีมี่) is a Muay Thai fighter. He is the former 160 lb and former 147 lb Lumpinee Stadium champion and two time Toyota Marathon tournament winner. He also competed one the One Championship Super Series circuit which featured some of the greatest strikers in the world.

== Muay Thai career ==
He won both the Lumpini Stadium and Thailand 147 lb title in December 2015, with a decision win over Manaowan Sitsongpeenong. In his next fight, he fought a rematch with Manaowan, and once again won by decision. He then entered the 2016 Toyota Marathon 154 lb tournament. Winning decisions against Francisco Salen in the quarterfinal, Phakhow Darbphong 191 in the semifinal and Rafael Fiziev in the final. After winning two more fights against Carlos Alberto and Mohamed Souane with Top King World Series, he entered the organizations 2016 tournament, and suffered his first loss of 2016, losing a decision to Yodwicha Por Boonsit.

Sorgraw entered the 2017 Toyota Marathon 154 lb tournament as well, facing Chamuaktong in the semifinal. He won the fight by decision, and took the tournament title by winning a decision against Rafael Fiziev. In March 2017, Sorgraw fought Jordan Watson for the Yokkao 70 kg title. Watson successfully defended the title by unanimous decision.

In September 2019, Sorgraw challenged the reigning Lumpini Stadium champion Jimmy Vienot for his 160 lb title. He won the fight by decision.

He was scheduled to fight Luis Cajaiba at Road to ONE 6: WSS. However, on December 21, the event was cancelled due to the COVID-19 pandemic. The fight was later rescheduled for February 28, 2021.

== Titles and accomplishments ==
- Professional Boxing Association of Thailand (PAT)
  - 2015 Thailand -147 lb Champion
- Lumpinee Stadium
  - 2015 Lumpinee Stadium -147 lb Champion
  - 2019 Lumpinee Stadium Middleweight (160 lbs) Champion
- Toyota Marathon
  - 2016 Toyota Marathon -154 lb Champion
  - 2017 Toyota Marathon -154 lb Champion
- World Muaythai Council
  - 2017 WMC World -160 lb Champion
- True4U Muaymanwansuk
  - 2019 True4u Middleweight Champion
- Battle of Muaythai
  - 2023 BoM Middleweight (72.5 kg) Champion

== Fight record ==
Date	Result	Opponent	Event	Location	Method	Round	Time
2025-4-15	Loss	(Cambodia) Lorn Panha	Krud Kun Khmer	Phnom Penh, Cambodia	TKO	3	1:42
2024-12-16	Loss	(Turkey) Acar Suayb	Kunlun Fight & Cicada FC	Phnom Penh, Cambodia	Decision (Unanimous)	3	3:00
2024-09-28	Loss	(China) Zhang Run	Kunlun Fight 102	Sanya, China	KO (Left hook to the body)	2	0:12
2024-06-22	NC	(United Kingdom) George Smith	MTGP Fight Night 88	United Kingdom	Doctor stoppage (eye poke)	1	2:17
2024-02-04	Loss	(Cambodia) Lao Chetra	Kun Khmer Super Strike	Phnom Penh, Cambodia	TKO(leg kick)	2	3:00
2023-11-23	Loss	(Cambodia) Eh Amarin Phouthong	Kun Khmer World Cup, 8 Man Tournament	Phnom Penh, Cambodia	Decision (Unanimous)	3	3:00
2023-10-01	Win	(Japan) Izaya Matsushima	Amazing Muaythai, Road to Rajadamnern × BOM 44	Tokyo, Japan	Decision (Unanimous)	5	3:00
Wins the vacant Battle of Muaythai Middleweight (72.5kg) title.
2023-05-14	Win	(Japan) Kenta	HOOST CUP - KICKBOXING WORLD CUP IN JAPAN	Tokyo, Japan	Decision (Unanimous)	3	3:00
2022-03-12	Loss	(Spain) Nayanesh Ayman	War Of Titans II	Madrid, Spain	Decision	3	3:00
2021-02-28	Loss	(Brazil) Luis Cajaiba	WSS Fights, World Siam Stadium	Bangkok, Thailand	Decision	5	3:00
2020-11-13	Loss	(Thailand) Thananchai Sitsongpeenong	True4U Muaymanwansuk, Rangsit Stadium	Pathum Thani, Thailand	Decision	5	3:00
2020-07-31	Win	(Thailand) Pongsiri P.K.Saenchaimuaythaigym	ONE Championship: No Surrender 2	Bangkok, Thailand	Decision (Split)	3	3:00
2019-11-29	Loss	(Thailand) Yodkhunpon Sitmonchai	Lumpinee Stadium	Bangkok, Thailand	Decision	5	3:00
2019-09-25	Win	(France) Jimmy Vienot	Lumpinee Stadium	Bangkok, Thailand	Decision	5	3:00
Wins the Lumpinee Stadium Middleweight (160 lbs) title.
2019-08-23	Win	(Iran) Mostafa Naghibi	Muay Thai Marathon Toyota Hilux Revo	Saraburi, Thailand	KO		
Wins True4U -160 lb title.
2019-07-12	Win	(Scotland) George Mann	ONE Championship: Masters Of Destiny	Kuala Lumpur, Malaysia	Decision (Split)	3	3:00
2018-12-29	Win	(France) Mohamed Houmer	14 Year Anniversary Phetchbuncha	Ko Samui, Thailand	TKO (Corner Stoppage)	2	3:00
2018-11-09	Loss	(Italy) Giorgio Petrosyan	ONE Championship 81: Heart of the Lion	Kallang, Singapore	Decision (Unanimous)	3	3:00
2018-08-23	Loss	(France) Jimmy Vienot	Best Of Siam XIII Rajadamnern Stadium	Bangkok, Thailand	Decision (Split)	5	3:00
Lost WMC World -160 lb title.
2018-06-29	Win	(France) Samy Sana	ONE Championship: Spirit of a Warrior	Yangon, Myanmar	Decision (Unanimous)	3	3:00
2018-04-28	Loss	(Thailand) Talaytong Sor.Thanaphet	Top King World Series 19, Final	Mahasarakham, Thailand	Decision	3	3:00
2018-04-28	Win	(Thailand) Nattakiat Phran26	Top King World Series 19, Semi Final	Mahasarakham, Thailand	Decision	3	3:00
2018-01-26	Win	(Thailand) Yodpayak Sitsongpeenong	True4U Muaymanwansuk Rangsit Stadium	Pathum Thani, Thailand	Decision	5	3:00
2017-12-06	Win	(Thailand) Manaowan Sitsongpeenong		Thailand	Decision	5	3:00
2017-	Win	(Belarus)		Thailand	Decision	5	3:00
Defends WMC World -160 lb title.
2017-09-01	Loss	(Thailand) Dechrid Sathian Muaythai Gym	Rangsit Boxing Stadium	Pathum Thani, Thailand	Decision	5	3:00
2017-06-30	Win	(Uzbekistan) Mansur Tolipov		Thailand	Decision	5	3:00
Defends WMC World -160 lb title.
2017-04-28	Win	(Algeria) Khalid Oman		Udon Thani, Thailand	TKO		
Wins WMC World -160 lb title.
2017-03-25	Loss	(England) Jordan Watson	Yokkao 23	Bolton, England	Decision (unanimous)	5	3:00
For the Yokkao 70kg title.
2017-02-24	Win	(Thailand) Dechrid Sathian Muaythai Gym	Rangsit Boxing Stadium	Pathum Thani, Thailand	Decision	5	3:00
2017-01-27	Win	(Kyrgyzstan) Rafael Fiziev	Toyota Marathon, Final	Phitsanulok, Thailand	Decision	3	3:00
Wins the Toyota Marathon -154 lb title.
2017-01-27	Win	(Thailand) Chamuaktong	Toyota Marathon, Semi Final	Phitsanulok, Thailand	Decision	3	3:00
2016-11-27	Loss	(Thailand) Yodwicha Por Boonsit	Top King World Series 11, Quarter Final	Nanchang, China	Decision (Unanimous)	3	3:00
2016-08-27	Win	(France) Mohamed Souane	Top King World Series	Chengdu, China	TKO	1	
2016-07-10	Win	(Brazil) Carlos Alberto	Top King World Series	Luoyang, China	Decision	3	3:00
2016-04-29	Win	(Kyrgyzstan) Rafael Fiziev	Toyota Marathon, Final	Chonburi, Thailand	Decision	3	3:00
Wins the Toyota Marathon -154 lb title.
2016-04-29	Win	(Thailand) Phakhow Darbphong 191	Toyota Marathon, Semi Final	Chonburi, Thailand	Decision	3	3:00
2016-04-29	Win	(Argentina) Francisco Salen	Toyota Marathon, Quarter Final	Chonburi, Thailand	Decision	3	3:00
2016-01-30	Win	(Thailand) Manaowan Sitsongpeenong	Rajadamnern Stadium	Thailand	Decision	5	3:00
2015-12-08	Win	(Thailand) Manaowan Sitsongpeenong	Lumpinee Stadium	Thailand	Decision	5	3:00
Wins Lumpinee Stadium and Thailand -147 lb title.
2015-09-27	Win	(Thailand) Petchmanee Dabrunsarakam	Rangsit Boxing Stadium	Pathum Thani, Thailand	Decision	5	3:00
2015-09-19	Win	(Thailand) Auisiewpor Sujibamikiew	Omnoi Boxing Stadium	Thailand	KO	3	
2015-08-22	Loss	(Thailand) Por.Tor.Thor. Petchrungruang	Omnoi Stadium	Samut Sakhon	Decision	5	3:00
2015-07-12	Win	(Thailand) Saensak Phetbancha	Rangsit Boxing Stadium	Pathum Thani, Thailand	Decision	5	3:00
2015-04-11	Loss	(Germany) Christian Baya	Choc des Mondes	France	KO	4	
2015-03-15	Win	(France) Fady Bou Abboud	Gala International Muaythai	Reims, France	Decision	5	3:00
2015-02-01	Win	(Thailand) Petchmanee Dabransarakham	Petyindee Fights, Rangsit Stadium	Pathum Thani, Thailand	Decision	5	3:00
2014-10-28	Loss	(Thailand) Sitthichai Sitsongpeenong	Petyindee Fights, Lumpinee Stadium	Bangkok, Thailand	TKO (Ref Stoppage/High Kick)	4	
For the vacant Lumpinee Welterweight title (147 lb) and Thailand (PAT) Welterweight title (147 lb)
2014-09-27	Win	(Thailand) Phetthaksin Por.Samranchai	Lumpinee Stadium	Bangkok, Thailand	KO	4	
2014-05-17	Win	(Thailand) Yuthachai Kiattipatphan	Lumpinee Stadium	Bangkok, Thailand	Decision	5	3:00
2014-04-19	Win	(Thailand) Daowut Lukhlongtan	Lumpinee Stadium	Bangkok, Thailand	Decision	5	3:00
2014-02-22	Win	(Thailand) Kulabkhao Sor.Nakhonchan	Lumpinee Stadium	Bangkok, Thailand	Decision	5	3:00
Legend: Win Loss Draw/No contest Notes

== Lethwei record ==
Lethwei record
0 Wins, 1 Loss, 0 Draw
Date	Result	Opponent	Event	Location	Method	Round	Time
2024-01-10	Loss	(Myanmar) Soe Lin Oo	Karen National New Year Challenge Fights	Myawaddy, Myanmar	TKO	3	
Legend: Win Loss Draw/No contest Notes

== See also ==
- List of male kickboxers
