= 2024 in Kunlun Fight =

Information
- First date: January 19, 2024

The year 2024 was the 11th year in the history of the Kunlun Fight, a kickboxing promotion based in China.

The events are broadcast on Jiangsu TV and streamed across ByteDance platforms Douyin, Xigua Video and Toutiao. The IBA Kunlun Fight World Cup events are broadcast in multiple countries including Russia on Match TV.

== List of Kunlun Fight 2024 events ==
#	Date	Event	Venue	Location
1	January 19, 2024	Kunlun Fight 94	Spaceplus	Bangkok, Thailand
2	January 20, 2024	Kunlun Fight 95	Spaceplus	Bangkok, Thailand
3	March 23, 2024	Kunlun Fight 96	Kunlun Fight Stadium	Tongling, Anhui, China
4	April 20, 2024	Kunlun Fight 98	JF Boxing Muay Thai Stadium	Pattaya, Thailand
5	April 27, 2024	Kunlun Fight 97	Kunlun Headquarters	Beijing, China
6	June 1, 2024	Kunlun Fight 99	Kunlun Fight Stadium	Tongling, Anhui, China
7	June 29, 2024	Kunlun Fight 100	Kunlun Fight Stadium	Tongling, Anhui, China
8	July 27, 2024	Kunlun Fight 101		Daming, Handan, Hebei, China
9	September 28, 2024	Kunlun Fight 102	Mangrove Tree International Conference Center	Sanya, Hainan, China
10	November 16, 2024	IBA Kunlun Fight World Cup	National Indoor Stadium	Beijing, China
11	December 16, 2024	Kunlun Fight & Cicada FC	Diamond Island Convention and Exhibition Center	Phnom Penh, Cambodia

== Kunlun Fight 94 ==
Kunlun Fight 94
- Promotion: Kunlun Fight
- Date: January 19, 2024
- Venue: Spaceplus
- City: Bangkok, Thailand

Event chronology
Kunlun Fight 94	Kunlun Fight 95

Kunlun Fight 94 was a kickboxing event held by Kunlun Fight on January 19, 2024, in Bangkok, Thailand.

=== Results ===
Kunlun Fight 97
Weight Class				Method	Round	Time	Notes
Kickboxing 61 kg	(Iran) Ali Zarinfar	def.	(China) Jianglong Li	Decision	3	3:00	2023 KLF 61 kg World Championship Tournament Final
Muay Thai 66 kg	(Uzbekistan) Sherzod Gaybulloev	def.	(Thailand) Auttawut Ghindasri	TKO	2		
Kickboxing 61 kg	(Iran) Ali Zarinfar	def.	(China) Jialong Zhou	Decision	3	3:00	2023 KLF 61 kg World Championship Tournament Semifinal
Kickboxing 61 kg	(China) Jianglong Li	def.	(Thailand) Sathaporn Preepom	Decision	3	3:00	2023 KLF 61 kg World Championship Tournament Semifinal
Muay Thai 63 kg	(Thailand) Pumpat Kofak	def.	(Turkey) Bekir Karaomerlioglu	Decision	3	3:00	
Kickboxing 61 kg	(China) Jialong Zhou	def.	(Azerbaijan) Kamran Orucov	KO	1		2023 KLF 61 kg World Championship Tournament Quarterfinal
Kickboxing 61 kg	(Iran) Ali Zarinfar	def.	(China) Jingkun Yu	Decision	3	3:00	2023 KLF 61 kg World Championship Tournament Quarterfinal
Kickboxing 61 kg	(China) Sathaporn Preepom	def.	(China) An Ran	Decision	3	3:00	2023 KLF 61 kg World Championship Tournament Quarterfinal
Kickboxing 61 kg	(China) Jianglong Li	def.	(Thailand) Tara Cherram	TKO	2		2023 KLF 61 kg World Championship Tournament Quarterfinal

== Kunlun Fight 95 ==
Kunlun Fight 95
- Promotion: Kunlun Fight
- Date: January 20, 2024
- Venue: Spaceplus
- City: Bangkok, Thailand

Event chronology
Kunlun Fight 94	Kunlun Fight 95	Kunlun Fight 96

Kunlun Fight 95 was a kickboxing event held by Kunlun Fight on January 20, 2024, in Bangkok, Thailand.

=== Results ===
Kunlun Fight 95
Weight Class				Method	Round	Time	Notes
Kickboxing 80 kg	(China) Yang Zhang	def.	(China) Wittayakorrn Thonsawan	TKO	1		
MMA 61 kg	(China) Cong Wang	def.	(China) Yanan Wu	Decision	3	5:00	
Kickboxing 70 kg	(China) Run Zhang	def.	(Azerbaijan) Vladimir Selim Koç	Decision	3	3:00	
Muay Thai 67 kg	(Georgia (country)) Emil Khalilov	def.	(Thailand) Wongaon Teerawat	Decision	3	3:00	
Kickboxing 60 kg	(Thailand) Wiradot Watamoo	def.	(China) Jiaqiang Wei	TKO	1		
Muay Thai 68 kg	(China) Yaolin Cui	def.	(Thailand) Boorapa Ladlakorn	KO	2		
Muay Thai 65 kg	(Thailand) Prasitchai Suksa-Woei	def.	(Thailand) Chadchay Leeseethuan	Decision	3	3:00	
Women's Kickboxing 48 kg	(Thailand) Pornsuree Por Tawat Chawin	def.	(China) Li Zhenxian	Decision	3	3:00	
Muay Thai 63 kg	(Thailand) A-non Rachvicha	def.	(Thailand) Phonsawan Phonphuang	Decision	3	3:00	
MMA 66 kg	(China) Asan Xie	def.	(Thailand) Prach Buapa	TKO	1		

== Kunlun Fight 96 ==
Kunlun Fight 96
- Promotion: Kunlun Fight
- Date: March 23, 2024
- Venue: Kunlun Fight Stadium
- City: Tongling, Beijing, China

Event chronology
Kunlun Fight 96	Kunlun Fight 96	Kunlun Fight 97

Kunlun Fight 96 was a kickboxing event held by Kunlun Fight on March 23, 2024, at in Tongling, Anhui, China.

=== Results ===
Kunlun Fight 96
Weight Class				Method	Round	Time	Notes
Kickboxing 70 kg	(Thailand) Detrit Sathian Gym	def.	(China) Run Zhang	Decision	3	3:00	
Kickboxing 61 kg	(China) Saliman Aobulihairi	def.	(Azerbaijan) Sathaporn Preepom	Decision	3	3:00	
Kickboxing 63 kg	(China) Jialong Zhou	def.	(Thailand) Frankke Siharach	Decision	3	3:00	
Kickboxing 66 kg	(China) Chunrui Liu	def.	(Thailand) Aphichet Sakunthai	TKO	1		
Kickboxing 75 kg	(China) Wang Xin	def.	(Iran) Niazii Peyman	TKO	1		
Kickboxing 70 kg	(China) Haoran Zhou	def.	(Iran) Yashar Kianpoor Hafshejani	Decision	3	3:00	
Muay Thai 70 kg	(China) Zhou Jiao	def.	(Thailand) Phonlaphat Temkhot	KO	1		
Kickboxing 63 kg	(Thailand) Pumpat Kofak	def.	(Thailand) Yingjie Shen	Decision	3	3:00	
Kickboxing 70 kg	(Iran) Majid Shahriyari	def.	(China) Junhao Xiong	Decision	3	3:00	

== Kunlun Fight 98 ==
Kunlun Fight 98
- Promotion: Kunlun Fight
- Date: April 20, 2024
- Venue: JF Boxing Muay Thai Stadium
- City: (China) Pattaya, Thailand

Event chronology
Kunlun Fight 96	Kunlun Fight 98	Kunlun Fight 97

Kunlun Fight 98 was a kickboxing event held by Kunlun Fight on April 20, 2024, at in Pattaya, Thailand.

=== Results ===
Kunlun Fight 98
Weight Class				Method	Round	Time	Notes
Kickboxing 75 kg	(China) Wang Xin	def.	(Thailand) Sudsakorn Sor Klinmee	Decision	3		
Muay Thai 75 kg	(Thailand) Saiyok Pumpanmuang	def.	(Uzbekistan) Ortikov Shokhruz	TKO	3	0:48	
Kickboxing 75 kg	(China) Wu Sihan	def.	(Thailand) Inphithak Master Ponlakon	KO	2		
Kickboxing 63 kg	(Thailand) Ausub Phatsiri	def.	(China) Wu Chenhao	TKO	1		
Kickboxing 65 kg	(Thailand) Tanakrong Kamsankaew	def.	(China) Xu Hongwei	TKO	2		
Kickboxing 52 kg	(Thailand) Chindalat Xaysongkham	def.	(China) Huang Zixi	KO	1		

== Kunlun Fight 97 ==
Kunlun Fight 97
- Promotion: Kunlun Fight
- Date: April 27, 2024
- Venue: Kunlun Headquarters
- City: Beijing, China

Event chronology
Kunlun Fight 98	Kunlun Fight 97	Kunlun Fight 99

Kunlun Fight 97 was a kickboxing event held by Kunlun Fight on April 27, 2024, in Beijing, China.

=== Background ===
This event marks the return of the 64-man Kunlun Fight 70 kg World Max Championship Tournament.

=== Results ===
Kunlun Fight 97
Weight Class				Method	Round	Time	Notes
Kickboxing 70 kg	(Iran) Mohammadreza Ghafari	def.	(Iran) Abolfazl Alipour Andi	TKO	2		2024 KLF 70 kg Qualifying Tournament B Final
Kickboxing 70 kg	(Thailand) Detrit Sathian Gym	def.	(Uganda) Umar Semata	Decision (Unanimous)	3	3:00	2024 KLF 70 kg Qualifying Tournament A Final
Kickboxing 75 kg	(Thailand) Janrob Sakhomsin	def.	(China) Kong Lingfeng	Ext.R Decision (Unanimous)	4	3:00	
Kickboxing 35 kg	(China) Li Yuxuan	def.	(China) Chen Mengyuan	TKO	1		
Kickboxing 66 kg	(China) Liu Chunrui	def.	(Thailand) Frankke Siharach	KO (High kick)	2	1:26	
Kickboxing 61 kg	(Thailand) Kueakkak	def.	(China) Lin Huo	Decision (Unanimous)	3	3:00	
Kickboxing 70 kg	(Iran) Abolfazl Alipour Andi	def.	(Spain) Nayanesh Ayman	Decision (Unanimous)	3	3:00	2024 KLF 70 kg Qualifying Tournament B Semifinal
Kickboxing 70 kg	(Iran) Mohammadreza Ghafari	def.	(Armenia) David Andreasyan	TKO	1		2024 KLF 70 kg Qualifying Tournament B Semifinal
Kickboxing 70 kg	(Uganda) Umar Semata	def.	(Egypt) Taha El Makarem	Decision (Unanimous)	3	3:00	2024 KLF 70 kg Qualifying Tournament A Semifinal
Kickboxing 70 kg	(Thailand) Detrit Sathian Gym	def.	(Belgium) Sabri Ben Henia	TKO	1		2024 KLF 70 kg Qualifying Tournament A Semifinal
Kickboxing 45 kg	(China) Wang Junbo	def.	(China) Zhu Faquan	Decision	3	3:00	

== Kunlun Fight 99 ==
Kunlun Fight 99
- Promotion: Kunlun Fight
- Date: June 1, 2024
- Venue: Kunlun Fight Stadium
- City: Tongling, Beijing, China

Event chronology
Kunlun Fight 96	Kunlun Fight 99	Kunlun Fight 97

Kunlun Fight 99 was a kickboxing event held by Kunlun Fight on June 1, 2024 in Tongling, Anhui, China.

=== Results ===
Kunlun Fight 99
Weight Class				Method	Round	Time	Notes
Kickboxing 70 kg	(United Kingdom) Jack Cooper	def.	(Iran) Hossein Karami	Decision	3		2024 KLF 70 kg Qualifying Tournament D Final
Kickboxing 70 kg	(China) Zhang Run	def.	(Russia) Nikita Zayakin	Decision	3		2024 KLF 70 kg Qualifying Tournament C Final
Kickboxing 61 kg	(China) An Ran	def.	(Thailand) Lenjamnong Sahatsawat	TKO	3		
Kickboxing 70 kg	(Iran) Hossein Karami	def.	(Georgia (country)) Davit Faroi	TKO	2		2024 KLF 70 kg Qualifying Tournament D Semifinal
Kickboxing 70 kg	(United Kingdom) Jack Cooper	def.	(Thailand) Frankke Siharach	TKO	3		2024 KLF 70 kg Qualifying Tournament D Semifinal
Kickboxing 70 kg	(Tajikistan) Somon Mirzoev	def.	(Thailand) Phetthrle Putthimed	KO	1		2024 KLF 70 kg Qualifying Tournament D Reserve Fight
Kickboxing 70 kg	(China) Zhang Run	def.	(Thailand) Chunyong Pongpisan	KO	1		2024 KLF 70 kg Qualifying Tournament C Semifinal
Kickboxing 70 kg	(Russia) Nikita Zayakin	def.	(Azerbaijan) Ravan Agazade	Decision	1		2024 KLF 70 kg Qualifying Tournament C Semifinal
Kickboxing 70 kg	(China) Xia Xiwang	def.	(Iran) Hossein Zadeh	KO	1		2024 KLF 70 kg Qualifying Tournament C Reserve Fight

== Kunlun Fight 100 ==
Kunlun Fight 100
- Promotion: Kunlun Fight
- Date: June 29, 2024
- Venue: Kunlun Fight Stadium
- City: Tongling, Beijing, China

Event chronology
Kunlun Fight 99	Kunlun Fight 100	Kunlun Fight 101

Kunlun Fight 100 was a kickboxing event held by Kunlun Fight on June 29, 2024 in Tongling, Anhui, China.

=== Results ===
Kunlun Fight 100
Weight Class				Method	Round	Time	Notes
Kickboxing 70 kg	(Italy) Lorenzo Di Vara	def.	(Thailand) Janrob Sakhomsin	Decision	3	3:00	2024 KLF 70 kg Qualifying Tournament F Final
Kickboxing 70 kg	(China) Meng Lingkuo	def.	(Spain) David Boros	TKO	1	2:57	2024 KLF 70 kg Qualifying Tournament E Final
Kickboxing 70 kg	(Thailand) Jomthong Chuwattana	def.	(Iran) Hossein Zadeh	Decision (Unanimous)	3	3:00	
Women's Kickboxing 35 kg	(China) Li Yuxuan	def.	(China) Shao Zhengyi	Decision			
Kickboxing 70 kg	(China) Saliman Aobulihairi	def.	(Iran) Mohammad Shahryaritahsin	TKO	1	2:23	
Kickboxing 70 kg	(Iran) Mohammadreza Ghafari	def.	(Thailand) Chuiprakhon Chaibooree	KO	1	0:36	
Kickboxing 61 kg	(Thailand) Yodkitti Tor.Tepsutin	def.	(China) Zhou Jialong	TKO	1	1:34	
Kickboxing 70 kg	(Italy) Lorenzo Di Vara	def.	(Iran) Arsalan Jamalpour	TKO	1	0:34	2024 KLF 70 kg Qualifying Tournament F Semifinal
Kickboxing 70 kg	(Thailand) Janrob Sakhomsin	def.	(Morocco) Mohamed Amine Elharrarlet	TKO			2024 KLF 70 kg Qualifying Tournament F Semifinal
Kickboxing 70 kg	(Morocco) Mohammed Islam	def.	(Spain) Abdo Chahidi	Decision	3	3:00	
Kickboxing 70 kg	(Spain) David Boros	def.	(Brazil) Marcos Alves	Decision	3	3:00	2024 KLF 70 kg Qualifying Tournament E Semifinal
Kickboxing 70 kg	(China) Meng Lingkuo	def.	(Thailand) Yodkhunpon Sitmonchai	KO	1		2024 KLF 70 kg Qualifying Tournament E Semifinal
Kickboxing 70 kg	(Iran) Alireza Abbasi Joudaki	def.	(Thailand) Rueangsak Arkom	KO	2		2024 KLF 70 kg Qualifying Tournament Reserve Fight

== Kunlun Fight 101 ==
Kunlun Fight 101
- Promotion: Kunlun Fight
- Date: July 27, 2024
- City: Daming, Hebei, China

Event chronology
Kunlun Fight 100	Kunlun Fight 101	Kunlun Fight 102

Kunlun Fight 101 was a kickboxing event held by Kunlun Fight on July 27, 2024 in Daming, China.

=== Results ===
Kunlun Fight 101
Weight Class				Method	Round	Time	Notes
Kickboxing 70 kg	(Australia) Jonathan Aiulu	def.	(France) Bevan Oguz	Ext.R Decision	4	3:00	2024 KLF 70 kg Qualifying Tournament H Final
Kickboxing 70 kg	(Russia) Vladimir Tulaev	def.	(Italy) Nicolas Novati	TKO	1		2024 KLF 70 kg Qualifying Tournament G Final
Kickboxing 61 kg	(China) Saliman Aobulihairi	def.	(Iran) Sayadi Mehrdad	TKO	1		
Kickboxing 52 kg	(China) Kuang Fei	def.	(Thailand) Nongbiw T. Thepsuthin	TKO			
Kickboxing 70 kg	(Brazil) Marcos Alves	def.	(Iran) Moslem Lashani	TKO			
Kickboxing 35 kg	(China) Shao Zhengyi	def.	(China) Qian Ziyuan	Decision	3		
Kickboxing 70 kg	(Australia) Jonathan Aiulu	def.	(Italy) Samuele De Meis	Decision (Unanimous)	3	3:00	2024 KLF 70 kg Qualifying Tournament H Semifinal
Kickboxing 70 kg	(France) Bevan Oguz	def.	(Bolivia) Kevin Guillen	Decision	3	3:00	2024 KLF 70 kg Qualifying Tournament H Semifinal
Kickboxing 70 kg	(Italy) Nicolas Novati	def.	(Thailand) Sammy Banchamek	KO	1		2024 KLF 70 kg Qualifying Tournament G Semifinal
Kickboxing 70 kg	(Russia) Vladimir Tulaev	def.	(Spain) Carlos Barbosa	Decision (Unanimous)	3	3:00	2024 KLF 70 kg Qualifying Tournament G Semifinal

== Kunlun Fight 102 ==
Kunlun Fight 102
- Promotion: Kunlun Fight
- Date: September 28, 2024
- Venue: Mangrove Tree International Conference Center
- City: Sanya, China

Event chronology
Kunlun Fight 101	Kunlun Fight 102	Kunlun Fight 103

Kunlun Fight 102 was a kickboxing event held by Kunlun Fight on September 28, 2024 in Sanya, China.

=== Results ===
Kunlun Fight 102
Weight Class				Method	Round	Time	Notes
Kickboxing 70 kg	(Iran) Masoud Minaei	def.	(Russia) Eduard Fatykov	TKO	3		2024 KLF 70 kg Qualifying Tournament J Final
Kickboxing 70 kg	(Portugal) João Silva	def.	(Brazil) Marcio De Jesus	TKO (knee injury)	1	0:20	2024 KLF 70 kg Qualifying Tournament I Final
Kickboxing 70 kg	(China) Zhang Run	def.	(Thailand) Sorgraw Petchyindee Academy	KO (Left hook to the body)	2	0;12	
Kickboxing 70 kg	(Iran) Mohammadreza Ghafari	def.	(Russia) Aik Danielyan	Decision (Unanimous)	3	3:00	
Kickboxing 61 kg	(China) Saliman Aobulihairi	def.	(Georgia (country)) Beka Gabisonia	TKO	1	1:16	
Kickboxing 100+ kg	(Iran) Hamidreza Kordabadi	def.	(Italy) Samuele Pugliese	TKO	2	1:16	
Kickboxing 35 kg	(China) Shao Zhengyi	def.	(China) Du Junyu	TKO	2		
Kickboxing 70 kg	(Brazil) Marcos Alves	def.	(Egypt) Taha El Makarem	TKO	1	2:47	
Kickboxing 70 kg	(Iran) Masoud Minaei	def.	(Thailand) Petchmorakot Petchyindee Academy	Decision (Majority)	3	3:00	2024 KLF 70 kg Qualifying Tournament J Semifinal
Kickboxing 70 kg	(Russia) Eduard Fatykov	def.	(Italy) Andrea Franzese	Decision (Unanimous)	3	3:00	2024 KLF 70 kg Qualifying Tournament J Semifinal
Kickboxing 70 kg	(Brazil) Marcio De Jesus	def.	(China) Yue Shuai	Decision (Unanimous)	3	3:00	2024 KLF 70 kg Qualifying Tournament I Semifinal
Kickboxing 70 kg	(Portugal) João Silva	def.	(Belarus) Dmitry Filonchyk	Decision (Unanimous)	3	3:00	2024 KLF 70 kg Qualifying Tournament I Semifinal

== IBA Kunlun Fight World Cup ==
IBA Kunlun Fight World Cup
- Promotion: Kunlun Fight
- Date: November 16, 2024
- Venue: National Indoor Stadium
- City: Beijing, China

Event chronology
Kunlun Fight 102	IBA Kunlun Fight World Cup	Kunlun Fight & Cicada FC

IBA Kunlun Fight World Cup was a kickboxing event held by Kunlun Fight on November 16, 2024 in Beijing, China.

=== Results ===
IBA Kunlun Fight World Cup
Weight Class				Method	Round	Time	Notes
Boxing 63.5 kg	(Serbia) Pavel Fedorov	def.	(France) Sofiane Oumiha	Decision (Unanimous)	6	3:00	Tournament Quarterfinal
Boxing 63.5 kg	(Cuba) Erislandy Álvarez	def.	(Kazakhstan) Adilet Kurmetov	Decision (Unanimous)	6	3:00	Tournament Quarterfinal
Boxing 63.5 kg	(Russia) Gabil Mamedov	def.	(Venezuela) Luis Arcon	Decision (Unanimous)	6	3:00	Tournament Quarterfinal
Boxing 63.5 kg	(Tajikistan) Bakhodur Usmonov	def.	(China) LeQuan Wang	Decision (Unanimous)	6	3:00	Tournament Quarterfinal
Kickboxing 63 kg	(China) Saliman Aobulihairi	def.	(Thailand) Yodkitti Tor.Tepsutin	KO (High kick)	1	0:43	
Kickboxing 70 kg	(Italy) Samuele De Meis	def.	(Brazil) Marcos Alves	TKO (Knee to the body)	3	0:27	
Kickboxing 70 kg	(Ukraine) Stanislav Kazantsev	def.	(Hungary) Renato Goman	TKO	2	1:25	
Kickboxing 85 kg	(China) Zhang Mingyang	def.	(France) Bilal Zeghlache	TKO (broken leg)	1	0:14	

== Kunlun Fight & Cicada FC ==
Kunlun Fight & Cicada FC
- Promotion: Kunlun Fight
- Date: December 16, 2024
- Venue: Diamond Island Convention and Exhibition Center
- City: Phnom Penh, Cambodia

Event chronology
IBA Kunlun Fight World Cup	Kunlun Fight & Cicada FC

Kunlun Fight & Cicada FC was a kickboxing and Kun Khmer event held by Kunlun Fight on December 16, 2024 in Phnom Penh, Cambodia.

=== Results ===
Kunlun Fight
Weight Class				Method	Round	Time	Notes
Kun Khmer 71 kg	(Thailand) Yodsanklai Fairtex	def.	(China) Zhou Jiao	TKO	1		
Kun Khmer 65 kg	(Cambodia) Thun Makara	def.	(Thailand) Mangkornyok Por.paideng	KO	1		
Kickboxing 75 kg	(South Korea) Han Jun	vs.	(Iran) Abolfazl Alipour Andi				
Kickboxing 67 kg	(Turkey) Acar Suayb	vs.	(Thailand) Sorgraw Petchyindee Academy	Decision (Unanimous)			
Kickboxing 75 kg	(Thailand) Saiyok Pumpanmuang	vs.	(China) Wang Xin				
Kun Khmer 65 kg	(Cambodia) Long Somnang	vs.	(Thailand) Mangkornyok Por.Paideng				
Kickboxing 70 kg	(China) Zhang Run	def.	(France) Arthur Klopp	Decision (Extra Round)	4	3.00	
Kickboxing 61 kg	(China) Zhou Jialong	def.	(Iran) Mehrdad Sayadi	KO			
Kun Khmer 55 kg	(Cambodia) Pipo	def.	(Myanmar) Saw Jadidah	KO	3		
Kickboxing 63 kg	(Iran) Mostafa Tabtoukhzadeh	def.	(China) An Ran	Decision (Unanimous)	3	3:00	
Kickboxing 52 kg	(Russia) Kristina Purgina	def.	(China) Kuang Fei	Decision	3	3:00	
Kickboxing 72 kg	(Cambodia) Long Sophy	def.	(China) Lu Jia	Decision (Unanimous)	3	3:00	
Kickboxing 70 kg	(China) Liang Ce	def.	(Cambodia) Thao Chhunheang	KO	1	0:13	
Kickboxing 68 kg	(China) Liu Renchuan	def.	(Cambodia) Siev Ngoy	Decision	3	3:00	
Kickboxing 51 kg	(Cambodia) Rithy Sokheon	def.	(China) Huang Zixi	TKO	2		

== See also ==
- List of Kunlun Fight events
- 2024 in Wu Lin Feng
- 2024 in Glory
- 2024 in K-1
- 2024 in RISE
- 2024 in ONE Championship
- 2024 in Romanian kickboxing
