= Kongthailand Kiatnavy =

Thai Muay Thai Kickboxer

Kongthailand
- Born: May 27, 1996 (age 30); Thailand
- Other names: Kongthailand Kao Sok
- Height: 5 ft 11 in (180 cm)
- Weight: 154 lb (70 kg; 11 st 0 lb)
- Style: Muay Thai
- Stance: Southpaw
- Team: Kiatnavy

Kickboxing record
- Total: 38
- Wins: 26
- By knockout: 10
- Losses: 12

Kongthailand Kiatnavy is a Thai Muay Thai kickboxer. He is the Lumpinee Stadium Super Welterweight world champion. The World Muay Thai Organization currently ranks him the number one Muay Thai super welterweight fighter at 154 pounds(69.853 kg). He is currently ranked #3 in the world by Combat Press at 154 pounds.

== Career ==
=== Lumpinee ===
In 2023 Kong defeated Luis Cajaiba for the Lumpinee Super-welterweight (154 lb) title by decision.

=== One Championship ===
On June 9, 2023 at One Friday Fights 20, Lumpinee Stadium world champion Kongthailand Kiatnavy was scheduled to make his promotional debut. In the catchweight category of 162.19 pounds, Victor "The Lumberjack" Teixeira beat Kongthailand Kiatnavy by knockout in round two.

=== WBC Muay Thai ===
Kongthailand captured the WBC MuayThai super-welterweight world title in Sydney, Australia on June 16, 2024. He stopped Luis Cajaiba of Brazil by TKO in the third round.

In 2025 Kong defeated Joe Ryan by decision for the WBC Muay Thai Middleweight (160 lbs) World title.

== Titles and accomplishments ==
- Lumpinee Stadium
  - 2023 Lumpinee Stadium Super-welterweight (154 lb) Champion
- World Boxing Council Muaythai
  - 2024 WBC Muaythai Super-welterweight (154 lb) Champion
- World Boxing Council Muaythai
  - 2025 WBC Muaythai Middleweight Champion (72.5 kg/160 lb) Champion

2x weight division champion at same time WBC

- Rebellion Muaythai
  - 2023 Rebellion Muaythai 70 kg 8 Man Eliminator Tournament Winner

== Fight record ==
Professional Muay Thai record
26 Wins (11 (T)KO's), 12 Losses, 0 Draw
Date	Result	Opponent	Event	Location	Method	Round	Time
2025-11-22	Loss	(Thailand) Rittewada Petchyindee Academy	Rajadamnern World Series	Bangkok, Thailand	Decision (Unanimous)	3	3:00
2025-09-06	Loss	(Russia) Dmitri Changelia	Rajadamnern World Series, Rajadamnern Stadium	Bangkok, Thailand	KO (Spinning back fist)	2	0:50
2025-06-28	Win	(Spain) Mikel Sortino	Rajadamnern World Series	Bangkok, Thailand	TKO (Referee stoppage)	2	1:36
2025-02-22	Win	(United Kingdom) Joe Ryan	Hungryside Super Show	Bentley, Australia	Decision	5	3:00
Wins the WBC Muay Thai Middleweight (160 lbs) World title.
2024-12-07	Win	(Australia) James Honey	Alliance Fight Promotion	Gold Coast, Australia	Decision (Split)	3	3:00
2024-06-16	Win	(Brazil) Luis Cajaiba	1774 MuayThai Series	Sydney, Australia	TKO (Referee stoppage)	3	
Wins the vacant WBC Muaythai World Super-welterweight (154 lb) title.
2023-10-29	Win	(Samoa) Jonathan Aiulu	Destiny 23	Queensland, Australia	Decision	5	
2023-08-12	Win	(Australia) Matthew Stevens	Rebellion Muaythai XXIX – 8-man Tournament, Final	Melbourne, Australia	Decision	3	3:00
Wins the Rebellion 8 Man Eliminator (154 lb) Tournament.
2023-08-12	Win	(Australia) Hugh O’Donnell	Rebellion Muaythai XXIX – 8-man Tournament, Semifinals	Melbourne, Australia	Decision	3	3:00
2023-08-12	Win	(Iran) Mohammad Siasarani	Rebellion Muaythai XXIX – 8-man Tournament, Quarterfinals	Melbourne, Australia	Decision	3	3:00
2023-09-08	Loss	(Brazil) Victor Texeira	ONE Friday Fights 20, Lumpinee Stadium	Bangkok, Thailand	KO (Right hook)	2	2:46
2023-05-06	Win	(Brazil) Luis Cajaiba	LWC Super Champ, Lumpinee Stadium	Bangkok, Thailand	Decision (Unanimous)	5	3:00
Wins the vacant Lumpinee Stadium Super-welterweight (154 lb) title.
2023-04-01	Win	(Thailand) Chokdamrong Chotbangsaen	LWC Super Champ, Lumpinee Stadium	Bangkok, Thailand	Decision	3	3:00
2023-02-18	Loss	(Thailand) Petchkantat M.U.Den	LWC Super Champ, Lumpinee Stadium – Global House Tournament, Final	Bangkok, Thailand	Decision	3	3:00
2023-02-18	Win	(France) Lotfi Talbi	LWC Super Champ, Lumpinee Stadium – Global House Tournament, Semifinals	Bangkok, Thailand	Decision	3	3:00
2023-01-14	Loss	(Cambodia) Thoeun Theara	PNN Sports	Phnom Penh, Cambodia	TKO	5	
2021-07-26	Loss	(Spain) Nicolas Mendes	MAX Muay Thai	Pattaya, Thailand	Decision	3	3:00
2020-02-16	Loss	(Lithuania) Sigitas Gaizauskas	MAX Muay Thai	Pattaya, Thailand	Decision	3	3:00
2019-12-13	Win	(Thailand) Sirisak Kor.Kesanon	MAX Muay Thai	Pattaya, Thailand	TKO (Doctor stoppage)	3	
2019-08-17	Loss	(Cambodia) Roeung Sophorn	CNC Boxing	Phnom Penh, Cambodia	Decision	5	
2019-06-02	Win	(Cambodia) Vong Noy	PNN Sports	Phnom Penh, Cambodia	Decision	5	
2019-01-27	Loss	(United States) Charles Johnson	MAX Muay Thai	Pattaya, Thailand	Decision	3	3:00
2018-09-16	Win	(Switzerland) Marouan Hallal	MAX Muay Thai	Pattaya, Thailand	TKO	1	
2018-	Win	(Thailand) Noppakao Chor.Chanathip	MAX Muay Thai	Pattaya, Thailand	TKO (Referee stoppage)	3	
Legend: Win Loss Draw/No contest Notes

== See also ==
- Lumpinee Boxing Stadium
- 2023 in ONE Championship
