= Manaowan Sitsongpeenong =

Thai Muay Thai kickboxer (born 1996)

- Born: Nopparat Pirkratok; September 27, 1996 (age 30); Sa Kaew, Thailand
- Native name: มะนาวหวาน ศิษย์สองพี่น้อง
- Other names: Manaowan Sittongpetchyindee; Nao
- Nationality: Thai
- Height: 1.74 m (5 ft 8 1/2 in)
- Weight: 66.7 kg (147 lb; 10.50 st); 70 kg (150 lb; 11 st)
- Division: Welterweight; Lightweight
- Style: Muay Thai
- Stance: Southpaw
- Fighting out of: Bangkok, Thailand
- Team: Sitsongpeenong Muaythai
- Trainer: Anuaysil Bunphengsri "Monlit Sitphodaeng", Jakkrit Fairtex, Tong Sitsongpeenong
- Years active: 8 (2008–present)

Kickboxing record
- Total: 97
- Wins: 69
- Losses: 26
- Draws: 2

Other information
- Website: www.sitsongpeenong.com
- Last updated on: June 20, 2016

Manaowan Sitsongpeenong (Thai: มะนาวหวาน ศิษย์สองพี่น้อง, Thai pronunciation: [má.nāːw.wǎːn sìt.sɔ̌ːŋpʰîːnɔ́ːŋ]; born September 27, 1996) is a Thai Muay Thai kickboxer. As of June 2016, he is the current Rajadamnern Stadium welterweight champion. He is ranked #3 by Lumpinee Stadium at Welterweight (147 lb), #8 by Thailand PAT at welterweight, and #3 by World Boxing Council Muaythai at welterweight.

== Biography and career ==
Manaowan Sitsongpeenong was born as Nopparat Pirkratok in Sa Kaew, Thailand on September 27, 1996. He had his first fight at the age of 12 in 2007.

On 5 March 2016, he fought in The Champion Muaythai 4-Man Tournament(70 kg) in Pattaya, Thailand. He first won against Teetong P. Rungsawat, then beat Choke Eminent Air in the finals.

On 24 April 2016, he fought Greg Petchsaman on Super Muaythai Workpoint and won via technical knock out in the second round.

On 27 May 2016, he fought Aziz Hlali and won the Rajadamnern Stadium title at 147 lb.

He is set to fight in the Toyota REVO 8-Man Tournament in June 2016.

== Titles and achievements ==
=== Titles ===
- 2017 WBC Muaythai Welterweight World Champion (147 lb)
- 2016 Rajadamnern Stadium Welterweight Champion (147 lb)
- 2016 The Champions Muaythai 4-ManTournament Champion (70 kg) (Former)

=== Current ranking ===
- N°3 Lumpinee Stadium at Welterweight (147 lb), May 2016
- N°8 Thailand (PAT) at Welterweight (147 lb), May 2015
- N°3 WBC Muaythai at Welterweight (147 lb), May 2016

== Fight record ==
Kickboxing record
69 Wins, 26 Losses, 2 Draws
Date	Result	Opponent	Event	Location	Method	Round	Time
2017-12-06	Loss	(Thailand) Sorgraw Petchyindee		Thailand	Decision	5	3:00
2017-05-13	Loss	(Morocco) Ilias Bulaid	Fight League 6	Hoofddorp, Netherlands	KO (Spinning Back Kick to the Body)	2	
2017-04-01	Loss	(Thailand) Petchtanong Banchamek	Super Muaythai Workpoint	Bangkok, Thailand	Decision	3	3:00
2017-02-23	Loss	(France) Fabio Pinca	Best of Siam, Rajadamnern Stadium	Bangkok, Thailand	Decision	5	3:00
Lost the Rajadamnern Stadium Welterweight Title (147 lb)
2017-01-28	Win	(France) Morgan Adrar	Burning Series 6	Paris, France	Decision	5	3:00
Wins the WBC Muaythai Welterweight World Title (147 lb)
2016-12-17	Loss	(China) Liu Xiangming	Glory of Heroes - Rise 5	Nanning, China	Decision	3	3:00
2016-10-22	Loss	(France) Dylan Salvador	La Nuit Des Challenges 16	Lyon, France	Decision	5	3:00
2016-08-03	Win	(Turkey) Omer Luktupfah	Super Muaythai Workpoint	Bangkok, Thailand	Decision	3	3:00
2016-06-24	Loss	(Thailand) Dejrit Poptheeratham	Toyota Revo 8-Man Tournament, Semi Finals	Hatyai, Thailand	KO	1	
2016-06-24	Win	(France) Ventino Thibaut	Toyota Revo 8-Man Tournament, Quarter Final	Hatyai, Thailand	Decision	3	3:00
2016-05-27	Win	(France) Azize Hlali	Best of Siam 8, Rajadamnern Stadium	Bangkok, Thailand	Decision	5	3:00
Wins the vacant Rajadamnern Stadium Welterweight Title (147 lb)
2016-04-24	Win	(France) Greg Petchsaman	Super Muaythai Workpoint	Bangkok, Thailand	TKO	2	—N/a
2016-03-05	Win	(Thailand) Choke Eminent Air	The Champion Muaythai 4-Man Tournament, Finals	Pattaya, Thailand	Decision	3	3:00
Wins The Champion Muaythai 4-Man Tournament (70 kg)
2016-03-05	Win	(Thailand) Teetong P. Rungsawat	The Champion Muaythai 4-Man Tournament, Semi Finals	Pattaya, Thailand	Decision	3	3:00
2016-01-30	Loss	(Thailand) Sorgraw Petchyindee		Thailand	Decision	5	3:00
2015-12-25	Loss	(Thailand) Petpanomrung Kiatmuu9	Toyota Vigo Marathon Tournament 2015, Semi Final	Chon Buri, Thailand	Decision	3	3:00
2015-12-08	Loss	(Thailand) Sorgraw Petchyindee	Lumpinee Stadium	Thailand	Decision	5	3:00
For the vacant Lumpinee Stadium and Thailand 147 lbs titles.
2014-04-19	Loss	(Thailand) Pornsanae Sitmonchai	Omnoi Stadium	Bangkok, Thailand	KO	2	
For the Omnoi Super Featherweight Championship belt (58kg).
Legend: Win Loss Draw/No contest Notes

== See also ==
- List of male kickboxers
