= Sebastian Lutaniuc =

Romanian kickboxer (born 2002)

- Born: Sebastian Lutaniuc; March 10, 2002 (age 24); Bistrița, Romania
- Nickname: White Wolf
- Height: 1.85 m (6 ft 1 in)
- Weight: 95 kg (209 lb; 14 st 13 lb)
- Division: Cruiserweight (2026–present); Light heavyweight (2024–present); Heavyweight (2020–2024)
- Style: Kickboxing, Muay Thai
- Stance: Orthodox
- Fighting out of: Bistrița, Romania
- Team: Profesional Fight Gym
- Trainer: Ionel Burduhos
- Years active: 2020–present

Kickboxing record
- Total: 39
- Wins: 25
- By knockout: 3
- Losses: 12
- Draws: 2

Sebastian Lutaniuc (born March 10, 2002), is a Romanian professional kickboxer who currently competes in the Light Heavyweight division of GLORY. He is the current ISKA World Cruiserweight Champion.

== Championships and accomplishments ==
=== Kickboxing ===
- International Sport Karate Association
  - 2024 ISKA World Cruiserweight Championship (Current)
    - One successful title defense
- Dynamite Fighting Show
  - 2024 DFS Cruiserweight Grand Prix winner
  - 2020 DFS Heavyweight Grand Prix finalist
- Ultimate Fighting Tournament
  - 2022 UFT Heavyweight Championship

== Kickboxing record ==
Kickboxing Record
25 wins (3 KOs), 12 losses, 2 draws
Date	Result	Opponent	Event	Location	Method	Round	Time
2026-12-11		(Greece) Dimosthenis Stampoulis	DFS 33	Bistrița, Romania			
2026-10-09	Loss	(Romania) Vasile Corcodel	K-1 World GP -90kg Preliminary in Iași, Semifnals	Iași, Romania	Decision (unanimous)	3	3:00
2026-04-25	Loss	(Turkey) Cem Cáceres	Glory 107	Rotterdam, Netherlands	Decision (unanimous)	3	3:00
2025-10-24	Win	(Romania) Mădălin Mogoș	DFS 28	Pitești, Romania	TKO (3 knockdowns)	1	2:41
2025-08-02	Win	(Brazil) Guilherme de Assis	Road to DFS 8	Bistrița, Romania	Decision (unanimous)	5	3:00
Defends the ISKA K-1 World Cruiserweight (-88.5 kg) title.
2025-05-30	Win	(Poland) Szymon Soltys	UFT 13 - Road to DFS 6	Cluj-Napoca, Romania	Decision (unanimous)	3	3:00
2025-02-22	Loss	(Germany) Agon Bellaqa	SENSHI 25	Varna, Bulgaria	Ext.R Decision (unanimous)	4	3:00
2024-12-06	Win	(Greece) Vasileios Karagkiozis	DFS 25	Oradea, Romania	Decision (unanimous)	5	3:00
Wins the vacant ISKA K-1 World Cruiserweight (-88.5 kg) title.
2024-10-11	Win	(Romania) Ionuț Busuioc	DFS 24 - Cruiserweight Grand Prix, Final	Târgu Jiu, Romania	Decision (unanimous)	3	3:00
Wins the 2024 DFS Cruiserweight Grand Prix.
2024-10-11	Win	(Romania) Marius Rotaru	DFS 24 - Cruiserweight Grand Prix, Semifnals	Târgu Jiu, Romania	Decision (unanimous)	3	3:00
2024-10-11	Win	(Romania) Alessio Sârbu	DFS 24 - Cruiserweight Grand Prix, Quarterfnals	Târgu Jiu, Romania	Decision (unanimous)	3	3:00
2024-07-20	Loss	(England) Daniel Sam	Road to DFS 5	Satu Mare, Romania	Ext.R Decision (split)	4	3:00
2024-06-07	Loss	(Hungary) Balázs Kiss	DFS 23	Bistrița, Romania	Decision (split)	3	3:00
2024-04-27	Win	(Belgium) Dorian van den Abeele	Transilvania Mix Kombat	Bistrița, Romania	TKO (right high kick)	1	2:48
2024-03-29	Win	(Romania) Marius Munteanu	DFS 22	Baia Mare, Romania	Decision (split)	3	3:00
2024-01-27	Loss	(China) Liu Ce	Wu Lin Feng 2024: 12th Global Kung Fu Festival	Tangshan, China	TKO (3 knockdowns/low kick)	1	2:48
For the vacant ISKA K-1 Intercontinental Super-cruiserweight (-95 kg) title.
2023-11-25	Win	(Ivory Coast) Oly Yves Roland	SENSHI 19	Varna, Bulgaria	Decision (split)	3	3:00
2023-09-16	Loss	(Canada) Olivier Langlois-Ross	SENSHI 18	Varna, Bulgaria	Decision (unanimous)	3	3:00
2023-06-30	Win	(Lithuania) Aidas Ceckauskas	Kombat London 2	Harrow, England	Decision	3	3:00
2023-05-13	Loss	(Romania) Ionuț Iancu	DFS 19 - Heavyweight Championship Tournament, Quarter Finals	Buzău, Romania	TKO (referee stoppage)	4	0:40
2022-10-20	Loss	(Romania) Ilie Brâncu	DFS 16	Iași, Romania	Ext.R Decision (unanimous)	4	3:00
2022-08-12	Win	(Romania) Marius Munteanu	UFT 10	Satu Mare, Romania	Decision	5	3:00
Wins the UFT Heavyweight (+95 kg) title.
2022-05-09	Loss	(Romania) Ilie Brâncu	Colosseum Tournament 31	Arad, Romania	Decision (unanimous)	3	3:00
2021-12-14	Draw	(Romania) Cristian Conea	Colosseum Tournament 29	Arad, Romania	Decision	3	3:00
2021-09-20	Win	(Romania) Cristian Conea	Colosseum Tournament 27	Oradea, Romania	Decision (majority)	3	3:00
2021-03-10	Loss	(Romania) Florin Ivănoaie	DFS 10	Bucharest, Romania	Decision (unanimous)	3	3:00
2020-08-20	Loss	(Romania) Ionuț Iancu	DFS 8 - Heavyweight Grand Prix, Final	Bucharest, Romania	Decision (unanimous)	3	2:00
For the 2020 DFS Heavyweight Grand Prix.
2020-08-20	Win	(Romania) Florin Ivănoaie	DFS 8 - Heavyweight Grand Prix, Semifnals	Bucharest, Romania	Decision (majority)	3	3:00
2020-08-20	Win	(Romania) Mihai Ştefan	DFS 8 - Heavyweight Grand Prix, Quarterfnals	Bucharest, Romania	Decision (unanimous)	3	3:00
2019-09-22	Win	(Romania) Alexandru Stan	Colosseum Tournament 15	Oradea, Romania	Decision (unanimous)	3	3:00
Legend: Win Loss Draw/No contest Notes

== See also ==
- List of male kickboxers
