= Ionuț Iancu =

Romanian professional kickboxer

- Born: Ionuț Alin Iancu; November 16, 1998 (age 27); Ișalnița, Romania
- Nickname: Tancul ("The Tank"); Tănculeț ("Tankette"); Tancul Olteniei ("The tank of Oltenia")
- Height: 1.82 m (5 ft 11 1/2 in)
- Weight: 127.4 kg (281 lb; 20.06 st)
- Division: Heavyweight
- Stance: Orthodox
- Fighting out of: Craiova, Romania
- Team: Benny Fight Academy; SCM Craiova
- Trainer: Benny Adegbuyi; Ionuț Pucă
- Years active: 2016–present

Professional boxing record
- Total: 2
- Wins: 2
- By knockout: 2
- Losses: 0
- Draws: 0

Kickboxing record
- Total: 46
- Wins: 32
- By knockout: 13
- Losses: 14
- By knockout: 2
- Draws: 0

Other information
- Boxing record from BoxRec

Ionuț Alin Iancu (born 16 November 1998) is a Romanian professional kickboxer, kempo practitioner, and former professional boxer.

He is best known for his outstanding achievements in Kempo, where he is a World Kempo Champion and a three-time World Kempo Vice-Champion. As a kickboxer, he currently competes in the Heavyweight division of GLORY. He is the former DFS Heavyweight Champion. As of 2025, he is ranked the #10 heavyweight in the world.

Iancu achieved international recognition upon signing with GLORY, capturing in 2024 both the Knockout of the Year for his debut stoppage of Murat Aygün and the Heavyweight Fight of the Year honors for his bout against Cihad Kepenek. Domestically, his performances have earned him multiple accolades, such as the Kickboxer of the Year title in the same year. By winning the 2025 Fan Favorite award, he established himself as one of the more popular kickboxers of the new Romanian wave.

== Personal life ==
Iancu was adopted at birth. His adoptive parents wanted him to become a mathematician and were reluctant to let him join a martial arts academy. He started training in judo, kyokushin and boxing. Iancu was subject to bullying by children.

He became a father to a baby girl in 2020. In 2022 his second child was born, a boy.

== Fighting style ==
Ionuț Iancu's fighting style has been compared to boxer Andy Ruiz.

== Championships and accomplishments ==
=== Kickboxing ===
- Glory
  - 2024 Knockout of the Year vs. Murat Aygün
  - 2024 Heavyweight Fight of the Year vs. Cihad Kepenek
- Dynamite Fighting Show
  - DFS Heavyweight Championship (one time)
    - Two successful title defenses
  - 2023 DFS Heavyweight Grand Prix winner
  - 2020 DFS Heavyweight Grand Prix winner
  - 2024 Best International Performance
- Kickboxing Romania Awards
  - 2025 Fan Favorite
  - 2024 Kickboxer of the Year
  - 2024 Knockout of the Year vs. Murat Aygün
  - 2023 Upset of the Year vs. Sebastian Cozmâncă

=== Kempo ===
- International Kempo Federation
  - 2023 IKF World Championships +95 kg Full-Kempo gold medalist (gold)
  - 2025 IKF World Championships +95 kg Full-Kempo silver medalist (silver)
  - 2025 IKF World Championships +95 kg Kempo KO silver medalist (silver)
  - 2026 IKF World Championships +95 kg Full-Kempo silver medalist (silver)

== Professional kickboxing record ==
Kickboxing record
32 wins (13 KOs), 14 losses (2 KOs), 0 draws
Date	Result	Opponent	Event	Location	Method	Round	Time	Record
2026-10-17	Loss	(Morocco) Nabil Khachab	Glory 110	Antwerp, Belgium	Decision (unanimous)	3	3:00	32-14-0
2025-08-23	Loss	(Serbia) Rade Opačić	Glory 103 - Last Heavyweight Standing Opening Round Phase 2	Rotterdam, Netherlands	TKO (low kicks)	3	0:25	32-13-0
2025-06-14	Loss	(Iran) Iraj Azizpour	Glory 100 - Last Heavyweight Standing Qualification Round, Semifinals	Rotterdam, Netherlands	Decision (split)	3	3:00	32-12-0
2025-04-05	Win	(Turkey) Cihad Kepenek	Glory 99 - Last Heavyweight Standing Opening Round	Rotterdam, Netherlands	TKO (retirement)	1	3:00	32-11-0
2024-12-07	Loss	(France) Sofian Laïdouni	Glory Collision 7	Arnhem, Netherlands	Decision (unanimous)	3	3:00	31-11-0
2024-10-12	Win	(Turkey) Cihad Kepenek	Glory 96	Rotterdam, Netherlands	TKO (3 knockdowns)	2	2:59	31-10-0
2024-06-08	Win	(Turkey) Murat Aygün	Glory Light Heavyweight Grand Prix	Rotterdam, Netherlands	KO (left hook)	2	1:43	30-10-0
2024-03-29	Win	(Netherlands) Brian Douwes	DFS 22	Baia Mare, Romania	Decision (unanimous)	3	3:00	29-10-0
2023-12-15	Win	(Romania) Florin Ivănoaie	DFS 21 - Heavyweight Championship Tournament, Final	Galați, Romania	TKO (towel thrown)	3	2:40	28-10-0
Won the DFS Heavyweight World Grand Prix. Defended the DFS Heavyweight Championship.
2023-09-22	Win	(Romania) Sebastian Cozmâncă	DFS 20 - Heavyweight Championship Tournament, Semi Finals	Bucharest, Romania	Decision (unanimous)	3	3:00	27-10-0
2023-06-03	Win	(Netherlands) Winfried Jops	Road to DFS 2	Târgoviște, Romania	Decision (split)	3	3:00	26-10
2023-05-13	Win	(Romania) Sebastian Lutaniuc	DFS 19 - Heavyweight Championship Tournament, Quarter Finals	Buzău, Romania	TKO (referee stoppage)	4	0:40	25-10-0
2022-09-10	Loss	(Romania) Cristian Ristea	Best of the Best	Brăila, Romania	Decision (split)	5	3:00	24-10
For the GFC Intercontinental Heavyweight Championship.
2022-06-11	Loss	(Romania) Sergiu Călin Pintye	Phoenix Fight Night	Kassel, Germany	Ext. R decision (split)	6	3:00	24-9
For the WKU European Heavyweight Championship.
2021-12-15	Win	(Romania) Ștefan Lătescu	DFS 13	Bucharest, Romania	TKO (three knockdowns)	2	2:01	24-8
Defended the DFS Heavyweight Championship.
2021-09-22	Win	(Morocco) Mohamed Seddik	DFS 12	Baia Mare, Romania	Decision (unanimous)	3	3:00	23-8
2021-06-04	Win	(Russia) Konstantin Gluhov	DFS 11	Bucharest, Romania	Ext. R decision (unanimous)	4	3:00	22-8
2021-03-10	Win	(Romania) Costin Mincu	DFS 10	Bucharest, Romania	KO (punches)	1	3:00	21-8
2020-12-04	Loss	(Romania) Marius Munteanu	DFS 9	Cluj-Napoca, Romania	Ext. R decision (split)	4	3:00	20-8
2020-08-20	Win	(Romania) Sebastian Lutaniuc	DFS 8, Final	Bucharest, Romania	Decision (unanimous)	3	2:00	20-7
Won the DFS Heavyweight World Grand Prix. Won the vacant DFS Heavyweight Championship.
2020-08-20	Win	(Romania) Ion Grigore	DFS 8, Semi Finals	Bucharest, Romania	TKO (referee stoppage)	3	1:47	19-7
2020-08-20	Win	(Romania) Ștefan Lătescu	DFS 8, Quarter Finals	Bucharest, Romania	Decision (split)	3	2:00	18-7
2020-03-05	Win	(Romania) Florin Ivănoaie	DFS 7	Arad, Romania	KO (punches)	4	2:29	17-7
2019-11-21	Loss	(Romania) Vasile Amariței	DFS 6	Iași, Romania	Decision (unanimous)	3	3:00	16-7
2019-06-06	Loss	(Italy) Claudio Istrate	DFS 4	Cluj-Napoca, Romania	Decision	3	3:00	16-6
2018-12-14	Loss	(Romania) Ciprian Șchiopu	DFS 3	Craiova, Romania	Decision (unanimous)	3	3:00	16-5
2018-10-29	Win	(Romania) Dumitru Țopai	Colosseum Tournament 9	Cluj-Napoca, Romania	Decision (unanimous)	3	3:00	16-4
2018-02-22	Loss	(Czech Republic) Georgij Fibich	Iron Fight Night 3	Jablonec nad Nisou, Czech Republic	Decision	3	3:00	—N/a
2017-10-20	Win	(Romania) Dumitru Țâră	GFC 3: Romania vs. Suriname	Craiova, Romania	Decision (unanimous)	3	3:00	—N/a
2017-08-24	Win	(Romania) Alexandru Mâțu	Urban Legend 2	Constanța, Romania	TKO (right hook)	1	1:03	—N/a
2017-05-28	Win	(Romania) Octavian Scoruș	Urban Legend 1	Constanța, Romania	Decision (unanimous)	3	3:00	—N/a
2017-04-01	Loss	(Romania) Cătălin Oprea	Luptă în ring, nu în stradă	Craiova, Romania	Decision	3	3:00	—N/a
2017-01-29	Loss	(Serbia) Rade Opačić	BPN Road to W5	Novi Sad, Serbia	TKO (referee stoppage/low kick)	2	1:20	—N/a
—N/a	Loss	(Romania) Horațiu David	—N/a	Romania	Decision	3	3:00	0-1-0
Legend: Win Loss Draw/no contest Notes

== Professional boxing record ==
2 fights	2 wins	0 losses
By knockout	2	0
By decision	0	0
Draws	0	

No.	Result	Record	Opponent	Type	Round, time	Date	Location	Notes
2	Win	2–0	Cătălin Dalcaran	KO	1	2022-05-07	Olimpia Arena, Timișoara, Romania	
1	Win	1–0	Ion Puiu	KO	2	2021-07-30	Olimpia Arena, Timișoara, Romania	

== See also ==
- List of male kickboxers
