= Valentin Mavrodin =

Romanian kickboxer and karate practitioner

- Born: February 29, 2004 (age 22); Brăila, Romania
- Other names: The Young Samurai
- Height: 1.77 m (5 ft 9 1/2 in)
- Weight: 70 kg (150 lb; 11 st)
- Division: Super Welterweight (2023–2024); Welterweight (2021–2023, 2025–present)
- Fighting out of: Brăila, Romania
- Team: Doru Ryu
- Trainer: Shihan Dorel Beșleagă
- Rank: black belt in Kyokushin budokai karate
- Years active: 2021 – present

Kickboxing record
- Total: 20
- Wins: 16
- By knockout: 7
- Losses: 4
- By knockout: 3
- Draws: 0
- Last updated on: May 17, 2025

Valentin Mavrodin Senpai (born 29 February 2004) is a Romanian professional kickboxer and karateka. He currently competes in the Dynamite Fighting Show (DFS), where he is a former DFS Middleweight Champion.

Mavrodin previously competed for the Colosseum Tournament promotion, where he was the Colosseum Tournament New Heroes Featherweight Champion.

In 2024, he signed with K-1 and made his promotional debut on 13 June.

Outside of professional kickboxing, Mavrodin is a three-time National Kyokushin Budokai Champion and a two-time National Amateur Kickboxing Champion.

Mavrodin underwent surgery in 2026 and is expected to return in the first half of next year. He later vacated the DFS middleweight belt and was challenged to a match by the new champion Albert Enache.

== Personal life ==
Mavrodin obtained a 1st Dan in Kyokushin budokai karate.

== Championships and accomplishments ==
- International Sport Karate Association
  - 2024 ISKA Oriental Rules World Super Welterweight Championship
- Dynamite Fighting Show
  - DFS Middleweight Championship
  - 2024 Kickboxer of the Year
  - 2023 Rising Star of the Year
- Colosseum Tournament
  - Colosseum Tournament New Heroes Featherweight Championship
- Kickboxing Romania Awards
  - 2024 Breakthrough Fighter of the Year
  - 2024 Fight of the Year vs. Călin Petrișor 2

== Professional kickboxing record ==
Kickboxing record
16 wins (7 KOs), 4 losses (3 KOs), 0 draws
Date	Result	Opponent	Event	Location	Method	Round	Time	Record
2025-05-17	Loss	(France) Guerric Billet	Veyle Kick Event	Saint-Jean-sur-Veyle, France	KO (calf kick)	5	1:42	16-4-0
Lost the ISKA World Super Welterweight Oriental Rules Championship.
2025-03-07	Win	(Brazil) Vinicius Bereta	DFS 26	Râmnicu Vâlcea, Romania	Decision (unanimous)	3	3:00	16-3-0
2024-12-14	Loss	(Poland) Kacper Muszyński	K-1 World Grand Prix 2024 Final	Tokyo, Japan	TKO (referee stoppage)	3	2:08	15-3-0
2024-10-11	Win	(Romania) Călin Petrișor	DFS 24	Târgu Jiu, Romania	Decision (unanimous)	5	3:00	15-2-0
Defends the DFS Middleweight Championship and wins the ISKA World Super Welterweight Oriental Rules Championship.
2024-06-13	Win	(Netherlands) Joey Klijenburg	K-1 Fighting Network Romania 2024	Galați, Romania	TKO (punches and knee)	1	2:37	14–2–0
2024-03-29	Win	(Romania) Marian Lăpușneanu	DFS 22 - Middleweight Championship Tournament, Final	Baia Mare, Romania	TKO (three knockdowns)	1	1:13	13-2-0
Won the inaugural DFS Middleweight Championship.
2024-03-29	Win	(Romania) Andrei Varga	DFS 22 - Middleweight Championship Tournament, Semi Finals	Baia Mare, Romania	Decision (unanimous)	3	3:00	12–2–0
2024-03-29	Win	(Romania) Darius Argyo	DFS 22 - Middleweight Championship Tournament, Quarter Finals	Baia Mare, Romania	Decision (unanimous)	3	3:00	11-2-0
2023-12-15	Win	(Romania) Călin Petrișor	DFS 21	Galați, Romania	Decision (unanimous)	3	3:00	10–2–0
2023-10-20	Loss	(Romania) Bogdan Floriștean	Colosseum Tournament 40 - Featherweight Championship Tournament, Final	Baia Mare, Romania	TKO (three knockdowns)	1	2:19	9-2-0
For the Colosseum Tournament World Featherweight Championship.
2023-10-20	Win	(Netherlands) Alfadel Alkasid	Colosseum Tournament 40 - Featherweight Championship Tournament, Semi Finals	Baia Mare, Romania	Ext. R decision (split)	4	3:00	9–1–0
2023-05-05	Win	(Romania) Daniel Dragomir	Colosseum Tournament 38	Brașov, Romania	TKO (referee stoppage)	5	2:52	8-1-0
Retained the Colosseum Tournament New Heroes Featherweight Championship.
2022-11-21	Win	(Romania) Daniel Dragomir	Colosseum Tournament 37	Buzău, Romania	Decision (unanimous)	5	3:00	7–1–0
Retained the Colosseum Tournament New Heroes Featherweight Championship.
2022-09-10	Win	(Romania) Marko Dușinschi	Best of the Best 1	Brăila, Romania	KO (head kick)	1	2:12	6-1-0
2022-08-18	Win	(Romania) Bogdan Floriștean	Colosseum Tournament 34 - Featherweight New Heroes Championship Tournament, Final	Brașov, Romania	Decision (unanimous)	3	3:00	5–1–0
Won the inaugural Colosseum Tournament New Heroes Featherweight Championship.
2022-08-18	Win	(Romania) Alex Popescu	Colosseum Tournament 34 - Featherweight New Heroes Championship Tournament, Semi Finals	Brașov, Romania	Decision (majority)	3	3:00	4-1-0
2022-05-09	Win	(Romania) Alex Popescu	Colosseum Tournament 31	Arad, Romania	TKO (three knockdowns)	2	1:35	3–1–0
2022-03-25	Loss	(Romania) Bogdan Floriștean	Prometheus 2	Ploiești, Romania	Decision (majority)	3	3:00	2-1-0
2021-10-25	Win	(Romania) Paul Cornea	Colosseum Tournament 28	Craiova, Romania	TKO (doctor stoppage)	3	0:22	2–0–0
2021-10-01	Win	(Romania) Andrei Cofei	Urban Legend 11	Constanța, Romania	TKO (towel thrown)	1	1:40	1–0–0
Legend: Win Loss Draw/no contest Notes

== See also ==
- List of male kickboxers
