= Bogdan Floriștean =

Romanian kickboxer

- Born: Bogdan George Floriștean; May 8, 2002 (age 24); Suceava, Romania
- Other names: The Bomb
- Height: 1.70 m (5 ft 7 in)
- Weight: 65 kg (143 lb; 10.2 st)
- Fighting out of: Suceava, Romania
- Team: Glorious Fight Team
- Trainer: Mihai Rusu

Kickboxing record
- Total: 28
- Wins: 19
- By knockout: 5
- Losses: 7
- By knockout: 1
- Draws: 1
- No contests: 1
- Last updated on: September 19, 2026

Bogdan George Floriștean (born 8 May 2002) is a Romanian professional kickboxer who currently competes in the featherweight division. He has fought for Colosseum Tournament, Dynamite Fighting Show and Fight Clubbing. He was scheduled to make his promotional debut on April 26, 2025 against Zhao Chongyang at WLF 554. However Wu Lin Feng announced the cancellation of the event.

== Personal life ==
Floriștean works as a firefighter at the ISU Suceava in addition to his fighting career.

== Championships and accomplishments ==
- Colosseum Tournament
  - 2023 Colosseum Tournament World Featherweight Championship
- Fight Clubbing
  - 2026 Fight Clubbing World Light Welterweight Championship
  - 2026 Fight Clubbing Interim World Light Welterweight Championship
- World Kickboxing Network
  - 2026 WKN European Welterweight Championship
- International Kick Boxing Federation
  - 2024 IKBF European -67 kg Championship

== Professional kickboxing record ==
Kickboxing record
19 wins (5 KOs), 7 losses (1 KOs), 1 draw
Date	Result	Opponent	Event	Location	Method	Round	Time	Record
2026-09-19	Loss	(Turkey) Şuayb Acar	Fight Clubbing 43	Izmir, Turkey	Decision (split)	5	3:00	19-7-1
Lost the Fight Clubbing World Light Welterweight Championship.
2026-07-03	Win	(Italy) Danilo Barletta	EFC 3	Mamaia, Romania	Decision (unanimous)	3	3:00	19-6-1
2026-05-22	Win	(Germany) Murat İnan	Glorious Fight Championship	Suceava, Romania	KO (body punch)	2	2:39	18-6-1
For the vacant WKN European Welterweight Championship.
2026-03-27	Win	(Spain) Javier Gálvez	EFC 2	Constanța, Romania	Decision (unanimous)	5	3:00	17-6-1
For the Fight Clubbing Interim World Light Welterweight Championship.
2025-10-11	Loss	(France) Lorenzo Sammartino	Louna Boxing 18	Sisteron, France	Decision (unanimous)	3	3:00	16-6-1
2025-06-08	Loss	(Romania) Ionuț Popa	DFS 27	Baia Mare, Romania	Decision (unanimous)	3	3:00	16-5-1
2025-05-24	Loss	(France) Bryan Lang	Cristal Boxing Event 8	Baccarat, France	KO (liver strike)	1	1:10	16-4-1
For the vacant ISKA World Super Lightweight Championship.
2025-04-04	Win	(Brazil) Osman Vacoev	Colosseum Tournament 45	London, England	TKO (three knockdowns)	1	1:11	16-3-1
2025-03-07	Win	(Romania) Ionel Bălan	DFS 26	Râmnicu Vâlcea, Romania	Decision (unanimous)	3	3:00	15-3-1
2024-10-12	Win	(Belgium) Jitser Bronselaer	Gent Thainight 2024	Gent, Belgium	Decision (unanimous)	5	3:00	14-3-1
For the vacant IKBF European -67 kg Championship.
2024-09-27	Win	(Romania) Cătălin Makove	Colosseum Tournament 44	Brașov, Romania	Decision (unanimous)	3	3:00	13-3-1
2024-06-28	NC	(Moldova) Dmitrii Sîrbu	Colosseum Tournament 43	Suceava, Romania	No contest (accidental headbutt)	1	1:33	12-3-1
2024-02-03	Loss	(France) Thomas Kerroumi	La Nuit du Pieds Poings 3	Nice, France	Decision (split)	3	3:00	11-3-1
2023-10-20	Win	(Romania) Valentin Mavrodin	Colosseum Tournament 40 - Featherweight Championship Tournament, Final	Baia Mare, Romania	TKO (three knockdowns)	1	2:19	11-2-1
For the Colosseum Tournament World Featherweight Championship.
2023-10-20	Win	(Romania) Cosmin Neagu	Colosseum Tournament 40 - Featherweight Championship Tournament, Semi Finals	Baia Mare, Romania	Decision (unanimous)	3	3:00	10-2-1
2023-06-30	Win	(Romania) Ionel Bălan	Colosseum Tournament 39	Suceava, Romania	Decision (unanimous)	3	3:00	9-2-1
2023-06-24	Draw	(Moldova) Ghenadie Gîtlan	Garuda Absolute Leadership	Ploiești, Romania	Draw	3	3:00	8-2-1
2022-10-21	Loss	(Romania) Andrei Sîrghi	Colosseum Tournament 36	Botoșani, Romania	Decision (majority)	3	3:00	8-2-0
2022-08-18	Loss	(Romania) Valentin Mavrodin	Colosseum Tournament 34 - Featherweight New Heroes Championship Tournament, Final	Brașov, Romania	Decision (unanimous)	3	3:00	8-1-0
For the inaugural Colosseum Tournament New Heroes Featherweight Championship.
2022-08-18	Win	(Romania) Paul Cornea	Colosseum Tournament 34 - Featherweight New Heroes Championship Tournament, Semi Finals	Brașov, Romania	Decision (unanimous)	3	3:00	7-0-0
2022-03-25	Win	(Romania) Valentin Mavrodin	Prometheus 2	Ploiești, Romania	Decision (majority)	3	3:00	6-0-0
Legend: Win Loss Draw/No contest Notes

== See also ==
- List of male kickboxers
