= Andrei Ostrovanu =

Romanian professional kickboxer

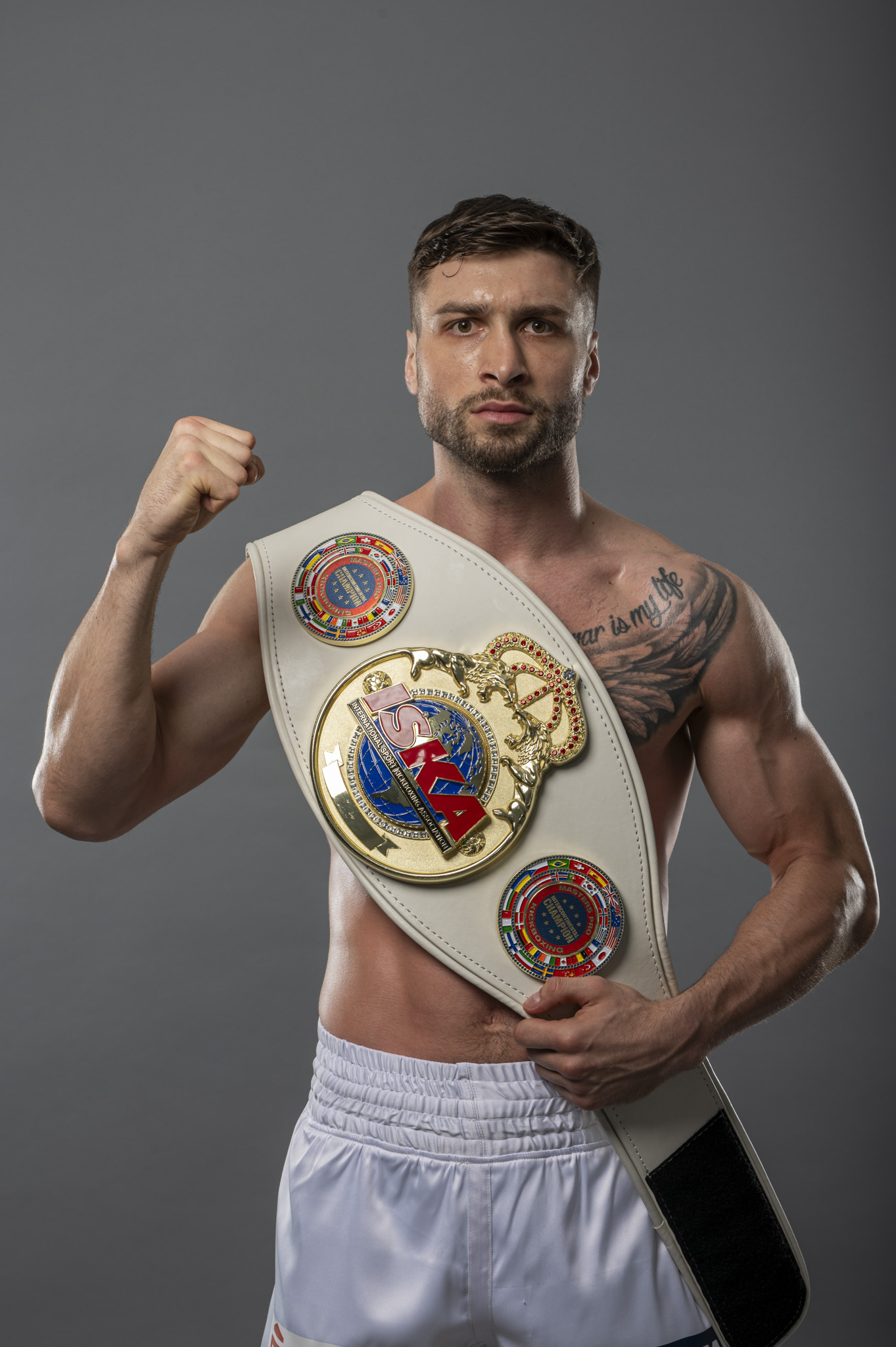
- Born: Andrei Ostrovanu; November 23, 1992 (age 33); Suceava, Romania
- Nationality: Romanian
- Division: Middleweight
- Style: Aggressive
- Team: Ostrovanu Fighting Academy
- Trainer: Tudor Prian | Robert Petrovan

Kickboxing record
- Total: 56
- Wins: 42
- By knockout: 24
- Losses: 13
- By knockout: 2
- Draws: 1
- Last updated on: January 10, 2025

Andrei Ostrovanu (born November 23, 1992, in Suceava, Romania) is a Romanian professional kickboxer. He competes in the super middleweight category and won the ISKA Intercontinental Championship in 2024. He has fought in national and international competitions and has participated in promotions such as Enfusion, K-1, Glory of Heroes, Mixfight Championship, Superkombat, Colosseum Tournament, and Dynamite Fighting Show (DFS). He is currently active in Dynamite Fighting Show and trains at Ostrovanu Fight Academy, previously was training at Ayo Gym Baia Mare.

== Background ==
According to the newspaper Devencea Suceava, Andrei Ostrovanu's interest in combat sports began at a young age, initially inspired by local sports culture in Suceava. He first pursued football before transitioning to kickboxing. Ostrovanu later moved to England, where he trained under the guidance of Horia Rădulescu, the trainer who has worked with fighters like Semmy Schilt and Daniel Ghiță. Ostrovanu has also trained in Zevenbergen, Netherlands, at the Superpro Sportcenter under Dennis Krauweel.

== Personal life ==
Andrei Ostrovanu is married to Mădălina Ostrovanu and resides in Baia Mare, Romania. He maintains an active presence on social media platforms, including Instagram and Facebook, where he engages with fans and shares insights into his training and career.

== Other activities ==
Ostrovanu has given public talks on topics such as discipline and personal development. Ostrovanu runs his own academy (Ostrovanu Fight Academy), where he coaches and mentors young athletes. Previously, he trained both children and adults at Ayo Gym in Baia Mare.

== Titles and achievements ==
=== Professional titles ===
- 2024: ISKA Intercontinental Champion
- 2019: Colosseum Tournament Champion
- 2014: Headhunters Fighting Championship Winner

=== Professional achievements ===
- 2024: KO of the Year, awarded at the Dynamite Fighting Show gala

=== Amateur titles ===
- 2012: WKF World Championships − 75 kg (165.3 lb) K-1 Gold Medalist

== Kickboxing record ==
Kickboxing record
42 Wins (24 KOs), 13 Losses (2 KOs), 1 Draw
Date	Result	Opponent	Event	Location	Method	Round	Time
2025-06-08	Loss	(United States) Omar Moreno	Dynamite Fighting Show 27	Baia Mare, Romania	KO (Punch)	4	1:49
2024-12-06	Win	(Cape Verde) Steven Mendes Furtado	Dynamite Fighting Show 25	Oradea, Romania	Decision (Unanimous)	3	3:00
2024-06-07	Win	(Romania) Alex Andreescu	Dynamite Fighting Show 23	Bistrița, Romania	Decision (Unanimous)	3	3:00
2024-03-29	Win	(United States) Omar Moreno	Dynamite Fighting Show 22	Baia Mare, Romania	TKO (Punches)	2	2:56
2021-09-22	Loss	(Romania) Florin Lambagiu	Dynamite Fighting Show 12	Baia Mare, Romania	Decision (Unanimous)	3	3:00
2021-06-04	Win	(Romania) Cezar Buzdugan	Dynamite Fighting Show 11	Bucharest, Romania	TKO (3 knockdowns)	1	2:01
2020-10-23	Win	(Romania) Flavius Boiciuc	Colosseum Tournament 20	Arad, Romania	Decision (Unanimous)	3	3:00
2020-12-18	Loss	(Romania) Sorin Căliniuc	Colosseum Tournament 22	Bucharest, Romania	Decision (Unanimous)	3	3:00
2019-12-01	Win	(Ivory Coast) Issouf Nanni	Colosseum Tournament 17	Bucharest, Romania	KO (Liver punch)	2	1:06
2019-09-22	Win	(Romania) Marian Dinu	Colosseum Tournament 15	Oradea, Romania	TKO (Corner stoppage)	1	1:55
2019-07-20	Win	(Romania) Andrei Șerban	Colosseum Tournament 14	Fălticeni, Romania	KO (Body shot)	2	0:45
2019-03-29	Win	(Bulgaria) Bogdan Shumarov	Colosseum Tournament 11	Bucharest, Romania	Decision (Split)	3	3:00
2018-12-14	Win	(Romania) Tarkan Ismail	Colosseum Tournament 10	Timișoara, Romania	Decision (Unanimous)	3	3:00
2018-09-22	Loss	(Morocco) Mohamed Hendouf	WFL: Suarez vs. Hovhannisyan	Almere, Netherlands	Decision	3	3:00
2017-10-15	Draw	(Romania) Alexandru Voicu	Colosseum Tournament 4	Bucharest, Romania	Draw (Unanimous)	3	3:00
2016-07-02	Loss	(United Kingdom) Reece McAllister	The Home Show	Blyth, England	TKO	2	3:00
2016-04-02	Win	(China) Zhang Dezheng	Glory of Heroes 1	Shenzhen, China	Decision (Unanimous)	3	3:00
2015-11-21	Loss	(Morocco) Mohammed Jaraya	Enfusion Live: Groningen	Groningen, Netherlands	KO (Body kick)	1	3:00
2015-05-23	Win	(Romania) Eduard Chelariu	SuperKombat World Grand Prix II 2015	Romania	Decision (Unanimous)	3	3:00
2015-03-07	Win	(Romania) Robert Stoica	SuperKombat World Grand Prix I 2015	Romania	Decision (Unanimous)	3	3:00
Legend: Win Loss Draw/No contest Notes

== See also ==
- Kickboxing in Romania
- ISKA (International Sport Karate Association)
