= Eduard Irimia =

Kickboxing promoter

- Born: July 10, 1974 (age 51); Ploiești, Romania
- Occupations: Kickboxing promoter, television producer, businessman
- Spouses: Adelina Irimia (m. 1997; div. 2007); Oana Irimia (m. 2014)
- Children: 2

Eduard "Edi" Irimia (born July 10, 1974) is a Romanian kickboxing promoter, television producer and businessman. He was the founder and CEO of Superkombat Fighting Championship and has promoted some of the most prominent names in kickboxing.

== Early life and education ==
Irimia was born in Ploiești, where his father was a boxing coach. Seeking to become a doctor, he attended medical school.

== Promoter career ==
=== Boxing ===
After a trip to England in 1996 where he attended a Naseem Hamed fight, Irimia first has become a boxing promoter. He promoted the first professional boxing event in Romania and fighters like Tony Badea, being the leading promoter on Pro TV.

On 23 March 2009 he was the cover subject of the first issue of Forbes Romania magazine.

=== Kickboxing ===
==== Local Kombat (2003–2010) ====
In 2003, Irimia founded Local Kombat. The show proved a ratings success. Local Kombat was home for fighters such as Cătălin Zmărăndescu, Ciprian Sora, Ionuț Iftimoaie, Daniel Ghiță, Sebastian Ciobanu and Cătălin Moroșanu. World Kickboxing Network was sanctioning the series of events.

==== K-1 (2007–2010; 2012–2013) ====
In 2007, he co-promoted K-1 Fighting Network Romania 2007 with K-1. Between 2008 and 2010, Irimia promoted K-1's ColliZion and other events across Europe. On 21 May 2010, he promoted K-1 World Grand Prix 2010 in Bucharest (in association with K-1). He assisted the Japanese organisation in securing talent coming out of Europe.

Between 2012 and 2013, together with the new board of K-1, Irimia promoted the K-1 World Grand Prix 2012 in Los Angeles and K-1 World Grand Prix 2012 in Tokyo final 16 events.

==== Superkombat Fighting Championship (2011–present) ====
In 2011, after the K-1 dissolution, fights promoted by Irimia started to air on Eurosport. After eight years of experience in Local Kombat, Irimia started to expand internationally launching the product under a new name, Superkombat World Grand Prix series (a knockout tournament featuring 16 kickboxers). On December 14, 2016, the broadcast deal with CBS Sports was announced.

== Producer ==
Irimia expanded his fighting enterprise producing television content and films. In 2018, Irimia established "Superfilm," alongside Hollywood producers Moshe Diamant and Christopher Milburn.

== Philanthropy ==
In December 2013, he donated all the incomes from the tickets sales for Superkombat World Grand Prix 2013 Final to flood victims of Galați.

In 2015, he donated portion of ticket sales for an event at Institutul Clinic Fundeni supporting oncology patients (children with cancer).

Irimia once again donated half of ticket sales for Superkombat World Grand Prix 2015 Final to Colectiv nightclub fire victims.

== Accomplishments ==
- World Independent Promoters Union Awards
  - Promoter of the Year (2011)

== Honours and decorations ==
=== Foreign honours ===
- Italy: Medal of Honor of the Italian Republic in 2013

== Personal life ==
He has been married to Oana Irimia since 2014, and they have one child together (Edward Andrei b. 2017). Irimia also has a daughter (Michelle b. 2004) from a previous marriage.

His brother, Emil Irimia, is a kickboxing and boxing supervisor and coordinator.
