= Simón Santana =

- Born: Dominican Republic
- Other names: The Fury
- Nationality: Norwegian; Spanish
- Height: 1.72 m (5 ft 7 1/2 in)
- Weight: 65 kg (143 lb; 10.2 st)
- Division: Lightweight; Welterweight
- Style: Kickboxing, Muay Thai
- Fighting out of: Strømmen, Greater Oslo Region, Norway

Kickboxing record
- Total: 41
- Wins: 27
- Losses: 13
- Draws: 1
- Last updated on: April 30, 2017

Simón Santana is a Norwegian–Spanish fighter who competes in the featherweight division. He has competed in the Enfusion, KOK and GLORY promotions. He started learning karate at 7 years old and competed until he was 17 years old. At age 17, he switched to kickboxing and Thai boxing. He began fighting in amateur and semi-pro matches before turning professional. He had a quick progression and became the Spanish champion in professional kickboxing in 2008.

He owns the Santana Kickboxing/K1 Club.

== Titles ==
Professional

- 2008 Spanish Master in professional Kickboxing
- 2015 Oslo Fight Night Champion
- 2015, 2016 Norwegian Champion in Thai boxing
- 2016 WKN Full Contact Featherweight World Champion
- 2018 WBC MT Pro Scandinavian Master

== Kickboxing record ==
Professional kickboxing record
27 Wins, 13 Losses, 1 Draw
Date	Result	Opponent	Event	Location	Method	Round	Time
2022-05-07	Loss	(Estonia) Markko Moisar	KOK 100 World Series in Tallinn	Tallinn, Estonia	TKO	2	
For the KOK European Bantamweight Championship.
2019-08-24	Loss	(Spain) David Mejia (kickboxer)	FEA World GP Odessa	Odesa, Ukraine	Decision (Unanimous)	3	3:00
2019-05-25	Loss	(China) Wei Rui	Glory of Heroes 38: Shantou	Guangdong, China	Decision (Unanimous)	3	3:00
2018-10-13	Win	(Estonia) Markko Moisar	King Of Kings 60	Tallinn, Estonia	KO (Low Kicks)	2	1:23
2018-06-09	Loss	(United Kingdom) Christopher Shaw	Enfusion	Staffordshire, England	Decision (unanimous)	3	3:00
2017-04-29	Loss	(Denmark) Mohammed El-Mir	Glory 40: Copenhagen	Copenhagen, Denmark	Decision (unanimous)	3	3:00
2016-11-12	Loss	(Romania) Cristian Spetcu	SUPERKOMBAT World Grand Prix 2016 Final	Bucharest, Romania	Decision (unanimous)	3	3:00
For the SUPERKOMBAT Lightweight Championship.
2016-10-08	Loss	(Spain) Jesus Romero	Enfusion Live Madrid, Semi Final	Madrid, Spain	Decision (unanimous)	3	3:00
2016-10-08	Win	(Spain) Roberto Alario	Enfusion Live Madrid, Quarter Final	Madrid, Spain	Decision (unanimous)	3	3:00
2016-05-21	Win	(France) Jonathan Pastorino	Full Contact Night	Nice, France	Decision (unanimous)	12	2:00
Wins the WKN Full Contact Featherweight World Championship.
2015-07-11	Loss	(Morocco) Ilias Bulaid	Enfusion Live #30	Dublin, Ireland	KO (knee to the head)	1	1:07
For the Enfusion -67 kg Championship.
2014-06-29	Win	(Portugal) Jose Varela	Enfusion Live London	London, England	KO (Right Cross)	1	2:36
2011-01-08	Loss	(Spain) Zeben Diaz	K-1 Max Madrid	Madrid, Spain	Decision (unanimous)	3	3:00
Legend: Win Loss Draw/No contest Notes

== See also ==
- List of male kickboxers
