= Florin Ivănoaie =

Romanian kickboxer (born 1997)

Florin Sorin Ivănoaie
- Born: March 24, 1997 (age 29); Timișoara, Romania
- Other names: Thor
- Height: 1.92 m (6 ft 3 1/2 in)
- Weight: 108 kg (238 lb; 17.0 st)
- Division: Heavyweight
- Stance: Orthodox
- Fighting out of: Timișoara, Romania
- Team: M-box Club
- Trainer: Miki Viel

Kickboxing record
- Total: 24
- Wins: 16
- By knockout: 6
- Losses: 8

Florin Sorin Ivănoaie (born March 24, 1997) is a Romanian professional kickboxer, fighting in the K-1 and Dynamite Fighting Show.

== Championships and accomplishments ==
=== Professional ===
- K-1
  - K-1 World GP 2024 in Sicily Runner-up
- Dynamite Fighting Show
  - 2023 DFS Heavyweight Grand Prix Runner-up

== Kickboxing record ==
Kickboxing record
16 wins (6 KOs), 8 losses
Date	Result	Opponent	Event	Location	Method	Round	Time
2025-12-06	Loss	(Lithuania) Mantas Rimdeika	SENSHI 29	Varna, Bulgaria	KO		
2025-10-12	Win	(Romania) Adrian Gheorghe	Blood Fight League 4	Timișoara, Romania	TKO (3 knockdowns)	1	1:45
2025-05-17	Win	(Netherlands) Errol Koning	SENSHI 26 - Gladiators	Plovdiv, Bulgaria	Decision (unanimous)	3	3:00
2025-02-22	Win	(Albania) Françesko Xhaja	SENSHI 25	Varna, Bulgaria	TKO (3 knockdowns/low kicks)	1	3:00
2024-07-27	Loss	(United Kingdom) Rhys Brudenell	K-1 World GP 2024 in Sicily, Final	Rosolini, Italy	KO (left hook)	2	0:46
Fails to qualify for the K-1 World Grand Prix 2024 Final.
2024-07-27	Win	(France) Malang Konta	K-1 World GP 2024 in Sicily, Semifinal	Rosolini, Italy	Decision	4	3:00
2024-07-27	Win	(Italy) Agatino La Rosa	K-1 World GP 2024 in Sicily, Quarterfinal	Rosolini, Italy	KO	1	
2024-04-20	Win	(Montenegro) Miroslav Vujović	Senshi 21	Bulgaria	Decision	3	3:00
2024-02-24	Loss	(Bosnia and Herzegovina) Ahmed Krnjić	Senshi 20	Varna, Bulgaria	Decision	3	3:00
2023-12-15	Loss	(Romania) Ionuț Iancu	DFS 21 - Heavyweight Championship Tournament, Final	Galați, Romania	TKO (corner stoppage)	3	2:40
For the DFS Heavyweight World Grand Prix.
2023-09-22	Win	(Romania) Cristian Ristea	DFS 20 - Heavyweight Championship Tournament, Semi Finals	Bucharest, Romania	Decision (unanimous)	3	3:00
2023-06-09	Win	(Moldova) Iaroslav Linnic	Fight Zone 10	Deva, Romania	Decision (unanimous)	3	3:00
2023-03-12	Win	(Romania) Cosmin Bucoveanu	Dynamite Fighting Show 18 - Heavyweight Championship Tournament, Quarter Finals	Timișoara, Romania	TKO	1	3:00
2022-12-08	Loss	(Germany) Vladimir Toktasynov	Dynamite Fighting Show 17	Constanța, Romania	TKO	1	1:03
2022-10-19	Win	(Romania) Yanis Ciulin	DFS 16	Iași, Romania	KO	1	2:06
2022-07-22	Win	(Romania) Cristian Ristea	Confruntarea Titanilor 24	Romania	TKO	4	1:51
2022-05-06	Win	(Romania) Valentin Bordianu	DFS 14	Bucharest, Romania	Decision (split)	3	3:00
2021-09-22	Win	(Romania) Vlăduț Ungureanu	DFS 12	Baia Mare, Romania	Decision (unanimous)	3	3:00
2021-06-04	Win	(Romania) Costin Mincu	DFS 11	Bucharest, Romania	Decision (unanimous)	3	3:00
2021-03-10	Win	(Romania) Sebastian Lutaniuc	DFS 10	Bucharest, Romania	Decision (unanimous)	3	3:00
2020-12-04	Loss	(Romania) Ștefan Lătescu	DFS 9	Cluj-Napoca, Romania	Decision	3	3:00
2020-08-20	Loss	(Romania) Sebastian Lutaniuc	DFS 8, Semi Finals	Bucharest, Romania	Decision	3	
2020-08-20	Win	(Romania) Marius Munteanu	DFS 8, Quarter Finals	Bucharest, Romania	Decision	3	
2020-03-05	Loss	(Romania) Ionuț Iancu	DFS 7	Romania	KO	4	
Legend: Win Loss Draw/no contest Notes

== See also ==
- List of male kickboxers
