= Cristian Spetcu =

Romanian kickboxer

- Born: October 6, 1989 (age 37); Bucharest, Romania
- Other names: Polo
- Nationality: Romania
- Height: 1.68 m (5 ft 6 in)
- Weight: 65 kg (143 lb; 10.2 st)
- Division: Lightweight; Featherweight
- Style: Kickboxing
- Stance: Orthodox
- Fighting out of: Bucharest, Romania
- Team: Ciprian Sora Gym
- Trainer: Ciprian Sora
- Years active: 2010-Present

Kickboxing record
- Total: 47
- Wins: 38
- By knockout: 7
- Losses: 8
- By knockout: 0
- Draws: 1

Cristian Spetcu (born November 6, 1989) is a Romanian kickboxer. He currently competes in the featherweight division for the Colosseum Tournament, where he is the reigning Colosseum Tournament World Featherweight Champion. Spetcu has also fought in Superkombat Fighting Championship, OSS Fighters, Kunlun Fight, Glory of Heroes, Wu Lin Feng and K-1.

As of June 2020, he is ranked the #4 lightweight in the world by Enfusion Live. As of 18 July 2020, he is the #5 ranked bantamweight in the world, according to the International Professional Combat Council (IPCC). As of November 2020, Spetcu is also ranked the #3 bantamweight in the world by Enfusion Live.

== Career ==
On 29 October 2016, in Changji, China at Rise of Heroes 3 Final, Cristian Spetcu defeated Wang Wanli by TKO to win the Rise of Heroes 3: 63 kg 4-man Tournament.

On 12 Nocvember 2016, in Bucharest, Romania at SUPERKOMBAT World Grand Prix 2016 Final, Cristian Spetcu defeated Simon Santana via unanimous decision to win the SUPERKOMBAT Lightweight Championship belt.

== Championships and awards ==
Kickboxing

- Colosseum Tournament
  - 2021 Colosseum Tournament World Championship
- SUPERKOMBAT Fighting Championship
  - 2016 SUPERKOMBAT Lightweight Championship
- Glory of Heroes
  - 2016 Rise of Heroes 3: 63 kg 4-man Tournament Winner
- World Traditional Kickboxing Association
  - 2015 WTKA 63.5 kg Championship

Amateur

- W.A.K.O World Championship
  - 2013 W.A.K.O World Championship (silver) -63.5 kg

== Kickboxing record ==
Kickboxing record
37 Wins (7 (T)KO's), 8 Losses (0 (T)KO's) 1 Draw
| Date | Result | Opponent | Event | Location | Method | Round | Time |
| 2021-05-31 | Win | (Moldova) Maxim Răilean | Colosseum Tournament 25 | Cluj-Napoca, Romania | Decision (Unanimous) | 5 | 3:00 |
Wins the Colosseum Tournament World Featherweight Championship.
| 2021-04-01 | Win | (Romania) Adrian Maxim | Colosseum Tournament 24 | Bucharest, Romania | Decision (unanimous) | 3 | 3:00 |
| 2019-12-07 | Loss | (Moldova) Marin Vetrilă | FEA kickboxing, Final | Chișinău, Moldova | Decision (Unanimous) | 3 | 3:00 |
| 2019-12-07 | Win | (Norway) Simon Santana | FEA kickboxing, Semi Final | Chișinău, Moldova | Decision (Unanimous) | 3 | 3:00 |
| 2019-02-28 | Win | (Greece) Filippos Petaroudis | OSS Fighters 03 | Bucharest, Romania | Decision | 3 | 3:00 |
| 2018-08-24 | Win | (China) Fang Feida | Wu Lin Feng 2018: WLF x OSS Fighters - China vs Romania | Mamaia, Romania | Decision (Unanimous) | 3 | 3:00 |
| 2018-05-13 | Loss | (China) Wang Wenfeng | Kunlun Fight 74 World -61.5 kg Tournament, Quarter Finals | Jinan, China | Decision (Split) | 3 | 3:00 |
| 2018-05-03 | Loss | (France) Karim Bennoui | MFC 7 | France | Decision | 3 | 3:00 |
| 2018-04-07 | Loss | (France) Sidy Barry | Partouche Kickboxing Tour, Semi Final | France | Decision | 3 | 3:00 |
| 2018-02-18 | Win | (Japan) Toshiki Taniyama | Bigbang 32 | Tokyo, Japan | Decision (Unanimous) | 3 | 3:00 |
| 2018-01-06 | Loss | (China) Deng Zeqi | Glory of Heroes: Wudang Mountain | Hubei, China | Ext. R Decision | 4 | 3:00 |
| 2017-11-23 | Loss | (Japan) Koya Urabe | K-1 World GP 2017 Heavyweight Championship Tournament | Tokyo, Japan | Decision (Unanimous) | 3 | 3:00 |
| 2017-04-28 | Win | (China) Liu Xiangming | Rise of Heroes / Conquest of Heroes: Chengde | Chengde, China | KO (Punches) | 3 | |
| 2017-02-25 | Loss | (China) Wei Rui | K-1 World GP 2017 Lightweight Championship Tournament, Semi Finals | Tokyo, Japan | Decision (Unanimous) | 3 | 3:00 |
| 2017-02-25 | Win | (Japan) Toshiki Taniyama | K-1 World GP 2017 Lightweight Championship Tournament, Quarter Finals | Tokyo, Japan | Decision (Unanimous) | 3 | 3:00 |
| 2016-11-12 | Win | (Norway) Simon Santana | SUPERKOMBAT World Grand Prix 2016 Final | Bucharest, Romania | Decision (unanimous) | 3 | 3:00 |
Wins the SUPERKOMBAT Lightweight Championship.
| 2016-10-29 | Win | (China) Wang Wanli | Rise of Heroes 3 Final | Changji, China | TKO | 2 | |
Wins the Rise of Heroes 3: 63kg 4-man Tournament.
| 2016-10-29 | Win | (China) Fang Feida | Rise of Heroes 3 Semi Final | Changji, China | Decision (unanimous) | 3 | 3:00 |
| 2016-10-01 | Win | (Spain) Jonathan Fabian | SUPERKOMBAT World Grand Prix 2016 Final Elimination | Bucharest, Romania | Decision (unanimous) | 3 | 3:00 |
| 2016-08-16 | Win | (United Kingdom) Mo Abdurahman | SUPERKOMBAT World Grand Prix IV 2016 | Comanesti, Romania | Decision (unanimous) | 3 | 3:00 |
| 2016-05-07 | Loss | (Greece) Stavros Exakoustidis | SUPERKOMBAT World Grand Prix II | Bucharest, Romania | Decision (Unanimous) | 3 | 3:00 |
| 2016-03-26 | Win | (United States) Turan Hasanov | SUPERKOMBAT World Grand Prix I 2016 | San Juan, Puerto Rico | TKO | 3 | |
| 2015-11-07 | Win | (Italy) Cristian Faustino | SUPERKOMBAT World Grand Prix 2015 Final | Bucharest, Romania | Decision (Unanimous) | 3 | 3:00 |
| 2015-10-02 | Win | (Morocco) Amed West | SUPERKOMBAT World Grand Prix 2015 Final Elimination | Milan, Italy | Decision (Unanimous) | 3 | 3:00 |
Wins the WTKA World -63.5 kg Championship.
| 2015-08-01 | Win | (Switzerland) Rahim Moutharrik | SUPERKOMBAT World Grand Prix IV 2015 | Mamaia, Romania | KO (Unanimous) | 1 | |
| 2015-05-23 | Win | (France) Suliman Vazeilles | SUPERKOMBAT World Grand Prix II 2015 | Milan, Italy | TKO (Towel Thrown) | 1 | |
| 2015-04-25 | Win | (Romania) Adrian Maxim | Confruntarea Titanilor | Bucharest, Romania | Ext.R Decision | 4 | 3:00 |
| 2015-03-07 | Win | (France) Luca Donadio | SUPERKOMBAT World Grand Prix I 2015 | Ploiesti, Romania | Decision (Unanimous) | 3 | 3:00 |
| 2014-09-27 | Draw | (Morocco) Hamza Essalih | SUPERKOMBAT World Grand Prix IV 2014 | Almere, Netherlands | Ext.R Decision | 4 | 3:00 |
| 2015-03-07 | Win | (Netherlands) Paul Jansen | SUPERKOMBAT World Grand Prix III 2014 | Constanta, Romania | Decision (Unanimous) | 3 | 3:00 |
| 2014-03-09 | Win | (Afghanistan) Mansour Yaqubi | SUPERKOMBAT New Heroes 7 | Ploiesti, Romania | Decision (Unanimous) | 3 | 3:00 |
| 2013-11-03 | Win | (Thailand) Apirak Sitmonchai | SUPERKOMBAT New Heroes 6 | Carrara, Italy | Decision (Unanimous) | 3 | 3:00 |
| 2013-08-31 | Win | (Romania) Florin Abrudan | SUPERKOMBAT VIP Edition | Bucharest, Romania | TKO (Right Low Kick) | 2 | |
| 2011-09-03 | Win | (Romania) Marius Grăunte | Challenge Fight | Bucharest, Romania | Decision (Unanimous) | 3 | 3:00 |
| 2011-04-29 | Win | (Romania) Daniel Gheorghiță | | Bucharest, Romania | Decision (Unanimous) | 3 | 3:00 |
| 2010-10-30 | Win | (Romania) Ștefan Sarvin | Gala TAI SHIN DO - Cupa KING AUTO | Bucharest, Romania | TKO (Referee Stoppage) | 3 | |
Legend: Win Loss Draw/No contest Notes

== Amateur Kickboxing record ==
Kickboxing record
| Date | Result | Opponent | Event | Location | Method | Round | Time |
|---|---|---|---|---|---|---|---|
| 2013-10 | Loss | (Russia) Shamil Gadzhimusaev | W.A.K.O World Championships 2013, K-1 Final -63.5 kg | Guaruja, Brazil | Decision (Unanimous) | 3 | 3:00 |
Wins the W.A.K.O 2013 -63.5 kg Silver Medal.
| 2013-10 | Win | (Austria) Saša Jovanović | W.A.K.O World Championships 2013, K-1 Semi Finals -63.5 kg | Guaruja, Brazil | Decision (Unanimous) | 3 | 3:00 |
| 2013-10 | Win | (Slovakia) Peter Franko | W.A.K.O World Championships 2013, K-1 Quarter Finals -63.5 kg | Guaruja, Brazil | TKO | 2 | 3:00 |
| 2013-10 | Win | (Canada) Patrick Reece | W.A.K.O World Championships 2013, K-1 First Round -63.5 kg | Guaruja, Brazil | TKO | 2 | 3:00 |
Legend: Win Loss Draw/No contest Notes
