= 2021 in Romanian kickboxing =

Information
- First date: February 26, 2021
- Last date: December 15, 2021

The 2021 season was the 19th season of competitive kickboxing in Romania.

== List of events ==
| # | Event title | Date | Arena | Location |
|---|---|---|---|---|
| 1 | Colosseum Tournament 23: Căliniuc vs. Bozan | February 26, 2021 | Colosseum Tournament Studios | Bucharest, Romania |
| 2 | Dynamite Fighting Show 10: Stoica vs. Latifaj | March 10, 2021 | Silva Complex | Bucharest, Romania |
| 3 | Colosseum Tournament 24: Spetcu vs. Maxim | April 1, 2021 | Colosseum Tournament Studios | Bucharest, Romania |
| 4 | Colosseum Tournament 25: Căliniuc vs. Matei | May 31, 2021 | ANL Hall | Cluj-Napoca, Romania |
| 5 | Dynamite Fighting Show 11: Stoica vs. Voronin IV | June 4, 2021 | Silva Complex | Bucharest, Romania |
| 6 | Road to Colosseum 1: Mihăilă vs. Graidia | June 19, 2021 | PalaRovagnati | Milan, Italy |
| 7 | GFC 7: Paraschiv vs. Baya | June 24, 2021 | Silva Complex | Bucharest, Romania |
| 8 | OSS Fighters 06: Stoica vs. Granville | July 16, 2021 | Piațeta Cazino | Constanța, Romania |
| 9 | Prometheus 1: Cardoş vs. Crăciunică | July 22, 2021 | Horia Demian Arena | Cluj-Napoca, Romania |
| 10 | KO Masters 9: Ristea vs. Balli | August 17, 2021 | Ambasad'or | Bucharest, Romania |
| 11 | Colosseum Tournament 26: Cardoș vs. Boiciuc | August 20, 2021 | Corvin Castle | Hunedoara, Romania |
| 12 | Colosseum Tournament 27: Căliniuc vs. Koprivlenski | September 20, 2021 | Antonio Alexe Arena | Oradea, Romania |
| 13 | Dynamite Fighting Show 12: Lambagiu vs. Ostrovanu | September 22, 2021 | Lascăr Pană Arena | Baia Mare, Romania |
| 14 | Urban Legend 11: Invictus | October 1, 2021 | Constanța Arena | Constanța, Romania |
| 15 | Pitbull Fighting Network 1: Rusu vs. Panaite | October 8, 2021 | Fălticeni Arena | Fălticeni, Romania |
| 16 | Colosseum Tournament 28: Amariței vs. Van Oeveren II | October 25, 2021 | Ion Constantinescu Arena | Craiova, Romania |
| 17 | Superkombat Universe: Doumbé vs. Emiev | November 1, 2021 | La Perle | Dubai, UAE |
| 18 | OSS Fighters 07: Ristea vs. Osaro | November 19, 2021 | Constanța Arena | Constanța, Romania |
| 19 | Colosseum Tournament 29: Marinescu vs. Rusu | December 14, 2021 | Arad Arena | Arad, Romania |
| 20 | Dynamite Fighting Show 13: Iancu vs. Lătescu II | December 15, 2021 | Silva Complex | Bucharest, Romania |

== Colosseum Tournament 23 ==
Colosseum Tournament 23
- Promotion: Colosseum Tournament
- Date: February 26, 2021
- Venue: Colosseum Tournament Studios
- City: Bucharest, Romania
- Attendance: None (behind closed doors)

Event chronology
| Colosseum Tournament 22: Ostrovanu vs. Căliniuc | Colosseum Tournament 23 | Dynamite Fighting Show 10: Stoica vs. Latifaj |

Colosseum Tournament 23: Căliniuc vs. Bozan was a kickboxing event produced by the Colosseum Tournament that took place on February 26, 2021 at Colosseum Tournament Studios in Bucharest, Romania.

=== Background ===
A Colosseum Tournament World Lightweight Championship bout for the vacant title between reigning Colosseum Tournament World Super Lightweight Champion Sorin Căliniuc and reigning ISKA World Middleweight Champion Gabriel Bozan served as the event headliner.

A welterweight bout between two-division Colosseum Tournament champion Eduard Gafencu and Anghel Cardoş took place at the event.

A welterweight bout between multiple world and European kempo champion Mirel Drăgan and Daniel Bolfă also took place at the event.

Featherweight fighters Vlad Trif and Marian Lăpușneanu were set to meet in a title eliminator and a highly anticipated rematch of their Colosseum Tournament 21 bout from 2020, but Lăpușneanu failed to make weight.

=== Results ===
Main card (FightBox)
| Weight class | | | | Method | Round | Time | Notes |
|---|---|---|---|---|---|---|---|
| Lightweight | (Romania) Sorin Căliniuc | def. | (Romania) Gabriel Bozan | Decision (unanimous) | 5 | 3:00 | (Note: For the vacant Colosseum Tournament World Lightweight Championship.) |
| Welterweight | (Romania) Anghel Cardoş | def. | (Romania) Eduard Gafencu | Decision (majority) | 3 | 3:00 |
| Welterweight | (Romania) Mirel Drăgan | def. | (Romania) Daniel Bolfă | Decision (unanimous) | 3 | 3:00 |
| Bantamweight | (Romania) Iulian Marinescu | def. | (Romania) Claudiu Brilă | Decision (unanimous) | 3 | 3:00 |
| Lightweight | (Romania) Alexandru Voicu | vs. | (Romania) Flavius Boiciuc | Draw | 3 | 3:00 |
| Middleweight | (Romania) Vasile Amariței | def. | (Romania) Ionuț Busuioc | Decision (split) | 3 | 3:00 |
| Lightweight | (Romania) Darius Argyo | def. | (Romania) Florin Pîrtea | Decision (majority) | 3 | 3:00 |
Preliminary Card
| Bantamweight | (Romania) Daniel Handrea | def. | (Romania) Victor Alexandru | TKO (doctor stoppage) | 1 | 3:00 |
| Lightweight | (Romania) Robert Guraliuc | vs. | (Romania) Ciprian Ivan | Draw | 3 | 3:00 |

== Dynamite Fighting Show 10 ==
Dynamite Fighting Show 10
- Promotion: Dynamite Fighting Show
- Date: March 10, 2021
- Venue: Silva Complex
- City: Bucharest, Romania
- Attendance: None (behind closed doors)

Event chronology
| Colosseum Tournament 23: Căliniuc vs. Bozan | Dynamite Fighting Show 10 | Colosseum Tournament 24: Spetcu vs. Maxim |

Dynamite Fighting Show 10: Stoica vs. Latifaj (also known as Day of the Warriors) was a kickboxing event produced by the Dynamite Fighting Show that took place on March 10, 2021 at Silva Complex in Bucharest, Romania.

Andrei Stoica made a special guest appearance at the event.

=== Background ===
A bout between former SUPERKOMBAT and Enfusion champion Bogdan Stoica and two-time ISKA Germany Champion Rinor Latifaj served as the event headliner. Stoica made return after two and a half years.

An openweight bout between former Colosseum Tournament champion Florin Lambagiu and Ion Grigore served as the co-main event.

Current Dynamite Fighting Show Heavyweight Champion Ionuț Iancu faced former Colosseum Tournament Heavyweight Champion Costin Mincu (also former WKF Cruiserweight Champion) in a non-title heavyweight bout.

=== Results ===
Main card (SportExtra)
| Weight class | | | | Method | Round | Time | Notes |
|---|---|---|---|---|---|---|---|
| Light Heavyweight | (Romania) Bogdan Stoica | def. | (Albania) Rinor Latifaj | Decision (unanimous) | 3 | 3:00 |
| Openweight | (Romania) Florin Lambagiu | def. | (Romania) Ion Grigore | Decision (split) | 3 | 3:00 |
| Heavyweight | (Romania) Ionuț Iancu | def. | (Romania) Costin Mincu | KO (punches) | 1 | 3:00 |
| Light Middleweight | (Romania) Bogdan Năstase | def. | (Germany) Thomas Blanck | TKO (towel thrown) | 3 | 2:00 |
| Heavyweight | (Romania) Ștefan Lătescu | def. | (Romania) Marius Munteanu | Decision (unanimous) | 3 | 3:00 |
| Super Lightweight | (Romania) Cezar Buzdugan | def. | (Romania) Alin Cîmpan | TKO (referee stoppage) | 2 | 2:21 |
| Heavyweight | (Romania) Florin Ivănoaie | def. | (Romania) Sebastian Lutaniuc | Decision (unanimous) | 3 | 3:00 |
| Featherweight | (Romania) Călin Petrișor | def. | (Moldova) Serghei Zanosiev | TKO (doctor stoppage) | 4 | 0:22 |
Preliminary Card
| Featherweight | (Romania) Marco Dușinschi | def. | (Romania) Adrian Baciu | Decision (unanimous) | 3 | 3:00 |

=== Awards ===
- Fight of the Night: Călin Petrișor vs. Serghei Zanosiev

== Colosseum Tournament 24 ==
Colosseum Tournament 24
- Promotion: Colosseum Tournament
- Date: April 1, 2021
- Venue: Colosseum Tournament Studios
- City: Bucharest, Romania
- Attendance: None (behind closed doors)

Event chronology
| Dynamite Fighting Show 10: Stoica vs. Latifaj | Colosseum Tournament 24 | Colosseum Tournament 25: Căliniuc vs. Matei |

Colosseum Tournament 24: Spetcu vs. Maxim was a kickboxing and boxing event produced by the Colosseum Tournament that took place on April 1, 2021 at Colosseum Tournament Studios in Bucharest, Romania.

Ciprian Sora made a special guest appearance at the event.

=== Background ===
A featherweight bout between former SUPERKOMBAT Lightweight Champion Cristian Spetcu and Adrian Maxim served as the event headliner.

Two-division Colosseum Tournament champion Cosmin Ionescu faced Vasile Amariței in a non-title super middleweight bout.

=== Results ===
Main card (FightBox)
| Weight class | | | | Method | Round | Time | Notes |
|---|---|---|---|---|---|---|---|
| Featherweight | (Romania) Cristian Spetcu | def. | (Romania) Adrian Maxim | Decision (unanimous) | 3 | 3:00 |
| Super Middleweight | (Romania) Vasile Amariței | def. | (Romania) Cosmin Ionescu | Decision (unanimous) | 3 | 3:00 |
| Welterweight | (Romania) Cătălin Graure | def. | (Romania) Emilian Sîngeorzan | Decision (unanimous) | 3 | 3:00 |
| Welterweight | (Romania) Balázs Bajkó | def. | (Romania) Alexandru Ostoia | Decision (unanimous) | 3 | 3:00 |
| Welterweight | (Romania) Mario Boboc | def. | (Romania) Denis Ceaușu | Decision (unanimous) | 3 | 3:00 |
| Middleweight | (Romania) Alexandru Amariței | def. | (Romania) Ciprian Bălănică | TKO (towel thrown) | 2 | 1:15 |
| Super Middleweight | (Romania) Radu Godja | def. | (Romania) Dragoș Coicea | TKO (three knockdown rule) | 1 | 1:26 |
| Featherweight | (Romania) Ionuț Popa | def. | (Romania) Cosmin Stîngaciu | TKO (referee stoppage) | 1 | 2:27 |
Preliminary Card
| Heavyweight | (Romania) Marian Rusu | def. | (Ukraine) Yuriy Protsenko | Decision (unanimous) | 3 | 3:00 |
| Light Heavyweight | (Romania) Răzvan Săndulache | def. | (Romania) Cristian-Gabriel Conea | Decision (split) | 3 | 3:00 |

== Colosseum Tournament 25 ==
Colosseum Tournament 25
- Promotion: Colosseum Tournament
- Date: May 31, 2021
- Venue: ANL Hall
- City: Cluj-Napoca, Romania
- Attendance: None (behind closed doors)

Event chronology
| Colosseum Tournament 24: Spetcu vs. Maxim | Colosseum Tournament 25 | Dynamite Fighting Show 11: Stoica vs. Voronin IV |

Colosseum Tournament 25: Căliniuc vs. Matei (also known as War Is Coming) was a kickboxing event produced by the Colosseum Tournament that took place on May 31, 2021 at ANL Hall in Cluj-Napoca, Romania.

Semmy Schilt made a special guest appearance at the event.

=== Background ===
A Colosseum Tournament Lightweight Championship bout between current champion Sorin Căliniuc (also the Colosseum Tournament Super Lightweight Champion) and former KOK Lightweight Champion Vitalie Matei served as the main event.

A Colosseum Tournament Featherweight Championship bout between the current champion Maxim Răilean and former SUPERKOMBAT Lightweight Champion Cristian Spetcu took place as the co-main event.

A super heavyweight bout between top draw Alexandru Lungu and Franco De Martiis took place at this event.

A non-title welterweight bout between two-division Colosseum Tournament champion Eduard Gafencu and Flavius Boiciuc took place at this event.

A welterweight bout between multiple world and European kempo champion Mirel Drăgan and Valentin Sachelaru took place at the event.

Former RXF champion Ion Surdu made his promotional debut under kickboxing rules in a welterweight bout against Laurențiu Negru.

Anghel Cardoş and Mahmoud Sfef met in a welterweight bout.

A super middleweight bout between top contender Vasile Amariței, and multiple champion of Morocco and Romanian-based Shakib Haroun took place at the event.

2019 gold medallist at junior kickboxing ISKA World Championships Silviu Ionescu and Paul Cornea met in a featherweight bout.

A bantamweight bout between top challenger Iulian Marinescu and Enfusion contender Rida Bellahcen was expected to take place at this event. However, their bout was scrapped just hours before the event started due to Bellahcen testing positive for COVID-19. They were then rescheduled for Colosseum Tournament 26 in July.

A light heavyweight bout involving former Colosseum Tournament and Dynamite Fighting Show champion Sebastian Cozmâncă was expected to take place at the event. However, Cozmâncă pulled out due to an injury.

=== Results ===
Main card (FightBox)
| Weight class | | | | Method | Round | Time | Notes |
|---|---|---|---|---|---|---|---|
| Lightweight | (Romania) Sorin Căliniuc (c) | def. | (Moldova) Vitalie Matei | Decision (unanimous) | 5 | 3:00 | (Note: For the Colosseum Tournament World Lightweight Championship.) |
| Featherweight | (Romania) Cristian Spetcu | def. | (Moldova) Maxim Răilean (c) | Decision (unanimous) | 5 | 3:00 | (Note: For the Colosseum Tournament World Featherweight Championship.) |
| Super Heavyweight | (Romania) Alexandru Lungu | def. | (Italy) Franco De Martiis | Decision (split) | 3 | 3:00 |
| Welterweight | (Romania) Eduard Gafencu | def. | (Romania) Flavius Boiciuc | Decision (unanimous) | 3 | 3:00 |
| Welterweight | (Romania) Mirel Drăgan | def. | (Romania) Valentin Sachelaru | Decision (majority) | 3 | 3:00 |
| Welterweight | (Moldova) Ion Surdu | def. | (Romania) Laurențiu Negru | TKO (doctor stoppage) | 1 | 1:06 |
| Welterweight | (Netherlands) Mahmoud Sfef | def. | (Romania) Anghel Cardoş | Decision (unanimous) | 3 | 3:00 |
| Super Middleweight | (Morocco) Shakib Haroun | def. | (Romania) Vasile Amariței | Decision (unanimous) | 3 | 3:00 |
| Featherweight | (Romania) Paul Cornea | def. | (Romania) Silviu Ionescu | Decision (unanimous) | 3 | 3:00 |
| Lightweight | (Romania) Darius Argyo | def. | (Romania) Alexandru Petruț | Decision (unanimous) | 3 | 3:00 |
| Bantamweight | (Netherlands) Sakvan Arab | def. | (Romania) Paul Tolaș | Decision (unanimous) | 3 | 3:00 |

== Dynamite Fighting Show 11 ==
Dynamite Fighting Show 11
- Promotion: Dynamite Fighting Show
- Date: June 4, 2021
- Venue: Silva Complex
- City: Bucharest, Romania
- Attendance: None (behind closed doors)

Event chronology
| Colosseum Tournament 25: Căliniuc vs. Matei | Dynamite Fighting Show 11 | Road to Colosseum 1: Mihăilă vs. Graidia |

Dynamite Fighting Show 11: Stoica vs. Voronin IV (also known as Moment of Truth) was a kickboxing event produced by the Dynamite Fighting Show that took place on June 4, 2021 at Silva Complex in Bucharest, Romania.

Bogdan Stoica made a special guest appearance at the event.

=== Background ===
A light heavyweight rematch bout between former SUPERKOMBAT Super Cruiserweight Champion Andrei Stoica and Pavel Voronin headlined this event. The pairing met previously at Dynamite Fighting Show 9 on December 4, 2020, where Stoica won via split decision.

A middleweight bout between former Colosseum Tournament Light Welterweight Champion Florin Lambagiu and KOK Light Heavyweight Championship challenger Petros Vardakas served as the co-main event.

Current Dynamite Fighting Show Heavyweight Champion Ionuț Iancu faced former K-1 World Grand Prix in Riga winner Konstantin Gluhov in a non-title heavyweight bout.

Two-time Romania Olympic boxing champion Ștefan Lătescu faced Bosnian icon Dževad Poturak in a heavyweight bout.

A heavyweight bout between former Colosseum Tournament champion Marius Munteanu and Sebastian Lutaniuc was scheduled for the event. However, Lutaniuc was forced to pull out due to injury. He was replaced by Florin Matei.

A super lightweight bout between former Colosseum Tournament champion Andrei Ostrovanu and Cezar Buzdugan took place at the event.

Former Colosseum Tournament World Featherweight Championship challenger Vlad Trif faced Romanian-based Serghei Zanosiev in a featherweight bout.

A heavyweight bout between former Colosseum Tournament champion Costin Mincu and Florin Ivănoaie was scheduled for the event.

Călin Petrișor and Bogdan Năstase were scheduled for the event. However, they were forced to pull out due to injuries.

=== Results ===
Main card (Pro X)
| Weight class | | | | Method | Round | Time | Notes |
|---|---|---|---|---|---|---|---|
| Light Heavyweight | (Romania) Andrei Stoica | def. | (Moldova) Pavel Voronin | KO (body knee) | 1 | 2:12 |
| Middleweight | (Romania) Florin Lambagiu | def. | (Greece) Petros Vardakas | Decision (unanimous) | 3 | 3:00 |
| Heavyweight | (Romania) Ionuț Iancu | def. | (Russia) Konstantin Gluhov | Decision (unanimous) | 4 | 3:00 |
| Heavyweight | (Romania) Ștefan Lătescu | def. | (Bosnia and Herzegovina) Dževad Poturak | Decision (unanimous) | 3 | 3:00 |
| Heavyweight | (Romania) Marius Munteanu | def. | (Romania) Florin Matei | Decision (unanimous) | 4 | 3:00 |
| Super Lightweight | (Romania) Andrei Ostrovanu | def. | (Romania) Cezar Buzdugan | TKO (three knockdown rule) | 1 | 2:01 |
| Featherweight | (Moldova) Serghei Zanosiev | def. | (Romania) Vlad Trif | Decision (unanimous) | 3 | 3:00 |
| Heavyweight | (Romania) Florin Ivănoaie | def. | (Romania) Costin Mincu | Decision (unanimous) | 3 | 3:00 |
Preliminary Card
| Lightweight | (Moldova) Tudor Potoroacă | def. | (Romania) Marian Șerban | KO (head kick) | 1 | 1:17 |
| Lightweight | (Romania) Marco Dușinschi | def. | (Romania) Ionuț Roman | Decision (unanimous) | 3 | 3:00 |

=== Bonus awards ===
The following fighters received 7,500 crypto bonuses.

- Knockout of the Night: Andrei Stoica
- Fight of the Night: Serghei Zanosiev vs. Vlad Trif

== Road to Colosseum 1 ==
Road to Colosseum 1
- Promotion: Colosseum Tournament
- Date: June 19, 2021
- Venue: PalaRovagnati
- City: Milan, Italy
- Attendance: 500 (Note: Due to the COVID-19 pandemic in Italy, the venue operated at limited capacity.)

Event chronology
| Dynamite Fighting Show 11: Moment of Truth | Road to Colosseum 1 | GFC 7: Paraschiv vs. Baya |

Road to Colosseum 1: Mihăilă vs. Graidia was a kickboxing event produced by the Colosseum Tournament that took place on June 19, 2021 at PalaRovagnati in Milan, Italy.

Due to local COVID-19 restrictions announced, the promotion was only permitted to host a limited capacity of 500 attendees.

Colosseum Tournament president Gabriel Georgescu offered contract to Francesco Maggio following his win.

Road to Colosseum will host future events in England, France, Switzerland, Germany and Turkey.

=== Background ===
A welterweight bout between former SUPERKOMBAT light heavyweight title challenger Adelin Mihăilă and three-time FIBA world champion Ayoub Graidia headlined the event.

=== Results ===
Main card (FightBox)
| Weight class | | | | Method | Round | Time | Notes |
|---|---|---|---|---|---|---|---|
| Welterweight | (Romania) Adelin Mihăilă | def. | (Tunisia) Ayoub Graidia | Decision (unanimous) | 3 | 3:00 |
| Lightweight | (Romania) Laurențiu Partenie | def. | (Italy) Lorenzo Salvaggio | TKO (towel thrown) | 2 | 1:58 |
| Lightweight | (Italy) Lorenzo Di Vara | def. | (Switzerland) Francesco Laquale | TKO (three knockdowns) | 3 | 2:57 |
| Lightweight | (Italy) Francesco Maggio | def. | (Burkina Faso) Issouf Nonni | TKO (three knockdowns) | 1 | 2:54 |
| Welterweight | (Italy) Roberto Sacco | def. | (Romania) Leonard Toader | Decision (unanimous) | 3 | 3:00 |
| Welterweight | (Morocco) Cherki Argoub | def. | (Romania) Andrei Băcoanu | KO (front kick) | 1 | 2:12 |
| Women's Strawweight | (Italy) Ilaria Pizzuti | def. | (Italy) Claudia Ferrario | Decision (unanimous) | 3 | 3:00 |

== GFC 7 ==
GFC 7
- Promotion: Golden Fighter Championship
- Date: June 24, 2021
- Venue: Silva Complex
- City: Bucharest, Romania
- Attendance: 500 (Note: Due to the COVID-19 pandemic in Romania, the venue operated at limited capacity.)

Event chronology
| Road to Colosseum 1: Mihăilă vs. Graidia | GFC 7 | OSS Fighters 06: Stoica vs. Granville |

GFC 7: Paraschiv vs. Baya (also known as Romania vs. Netherlands II) was a kickboxing event produced by the Golden Fighter Championship that took place on June 24, 2021 at Silva Complex in Bucharest, Romania.

Eduard Irimia and Ismael Londt made special guest appearances at the event.

=== Background ===
A GFC Intercontinental Light Middleweight Championship bout between SUPERKOMBAT Middleweight Champion Amansio Paraschiv and former Glory Lightweight Championship challenger Christian Baya served as the main event.

A middleweight bout between Michael Boapeah and Serkan Çelebi took place as the co-main event.

A WKU World Light Welterweight Championship bout between former Mix Fight Championship Light Welterweight Champion Jan Kaffa and former GFC European Light Welterweight Championship challenger Petru Morari completed the group of title fights.

=== Results ===
Main card (FightBox)
| Weight class | | | | Method | Round | Time | Notes |
|---|---|---|---|---|---|---|---|
| Lightweight | (Romania) Amansio Paraschiv | def. | (Netherlands) Christian Baya | Decision (split) | 3 | 3:00 | (Note: For the GFC Intercontinental Light Middleweight Championship.) |
| Middleweight | (Netherlands) Michael Boapeah | def. | (Romania) Serkan Çelebi | TKO (cut) | 1 | 2:32 |
| Featherweight | (Moldova) Petru Morari | def. | (Netherlands) Jan Kaffa | KO (spinning head kick) | 4 | 0:24 | (Note: For the WKU World Light Welterweight Championship.) |
| Heavyweight | (Netherlands) Jimmy Livinus | def. | (Moldova) Iaroslav Linnic | TKO (arm injury) | 1 | 3:00 |
| Super Lightweight | (Romania) Alin Cîmpan | vs. | (Netherlands) Mustapha Hourri | No contest | 1 | 1:50 |
| Super Featherweight | (Netherlands) Lofogo Sarour | def. | (Moldova) Tudor Potoroacă | KO (low kick) | 2 | 2:13 |
| Featherweight | (Romania) Ionuț Popa | def. | (Netherlands) Lennart Blijd | Decision (split) | 3 | 3:00 |
Preliminary Card
| Super Bantamweight | (Romania) Ionel Bălan | def. | (Moldova) Valerii Strungari | TKO (referee stoppage) | 2 | 1:05 |
| Middleweight | (Romania) Răzvan Macioi | def. | (Romania) Cătălin Lefter | TKO (three knockdowns) | 1 | 2:54 |

== OSS Fighters 06 ==
OSS Fighters 06
- Promotion: OSS Fighters
- Date: July 16, 2021
- Venue: Piațeta Cazino
- City: Mamaia, Constanța, Romania
- Attendance: 2,000 (Note: Due to the COVID-19 pandemic in Romania, the venue operated at limited capacity.)

Event chronology
| GFC 7: Paraschiv vs. Baya | OSS Fighters 06 | Prometheus 1: Cardoş vs. Crăciunică |

OSS Fighters 06: Stoica vs. Granville (also known as Filip's Final Fight) was a kickboxing and mixed martial arts outdoor event produced by the OSS Fighters that took place on July 16, 2021 at the Piațeta Cazino in Mamaia, Constanța, Romania.

Benjamin Adegbuyi, Ismael Londt and Tarik Khbabez made special guest appearances at the event.

=== Background ===
A super welterweight rematch between multiple-time national kyokushin champion Alexandru Filip and Levan Guruli took place at this event. They met previously in a bout at Superkombat New Heroes 9 on June 25, 2016, where Filip won by third round TKO. Prior to the fight, Filip officially announced his retirement.

A heavyweight bout between former SUPERKOMBAT and Enfusion champion Bogdan Stoica and John Granville headlined the event.

Current SUPERKOMBAT Middleweight Champion Amansio Paraschiv (also the GFC Intercontinental Light Middleweight Champion) faced former Enfusion title challenger Zahid Zairov in the co-main event.

=== Results ===
Main card (Digi Sport)
| Weight class | | | | Method | Round | Time | Notes |
|---|---|---|---|---|---|---|---|
| Welterweight | (Romania) Alex Filip | def. | (Georgia (country)) Levan Guruli | Decision (unanimous) | 3 | 3:00 |
| Heavyweight | (Romania) Bogdan Stoica | def. | (Netherlands) John Granville | TKO (doctor stoppage) | 2 | 2:43 |
| Lightweight | (Romania) Amansio Paraschiv | def. | (Netherlands) Zahid Zairov | Decision (unanimous) | 3 | 3:00 |
| Heavyweight | (Romania) Cristian Ristea | def. | (Netherlands) Nico Pereira Horta | Decision (split) | 3 | 3:00 |
| Middleweight | (Romania) Claudiu Alexe | def. | (Romania) Emilian Sîngeorzan | Decision (unanimous) | 3 | 3:00 |
| Super Lightweight | (Romania) Ștefan Orza | def. | (Moldova) Valentin Pascali | KO (punches and knee) | 2 | 2:57 |
| Heavyweight | (Romania) Vlăduț Ungureanu | def. | (Romania) Alexandru Radnev | KO (punches) | 1 | 2:59 |
| Middleweight | (Romania) Mădălin Mogoş | def. | (Romania) Alexandru Stan | TKO (doctor stoppage) | 1 | 1:52 |
| Welterweight | (Romania) Alexandru Irimia | def. | (Romania) Robert Țiprigan | Decision (unanimous) | 4 | 3:00 |
Preliminary Card
| Middleweight | (Romania) Răzvan Macioi | def. | (Romania) Alexandru Tocică | Decision (unanimous) | 3 | 3:00 |

== Prometheus 1 ==
Prometheus 1
- Promotion: Prometheus Fighting Promotion
- Date: July 22, 2021
- Venue: Horia Demian Arena
- City: Cluj-Napoca, Romania
- Attendance: 800 (Note: Due to the COVID-19 pandemic in Romania, the venue operated at limited capacity.)

Event chronology
| OSS Fighters 06: Stoica vs. Granville | Prometheus 1 | KO Masters 9: Ristea vs. Balli |

Prometheus 1: Cardoş vs. Crăciunică was a kickboxing and mixed martial arts event produced by the Prometheus Fighting Promotion that took place on July 22, 2021 at Horia Demian Arena in Cluj-Napoca, Romania.

=== Background ===
A welterweight bout between veteran Anghel Cardoş and APP Fight Night 01 tournament winner Mădălin Crăciunică was scheduled as the event headliner.

A featherweight bout between former two-time Colosseum Tournament Featherweight Championship challenger Adrian Maxim and top prospect Ionuț Popa took place as the co-main event.

A bantamweight fight between Colosseum Tournament bantamweight title contender Iulian Marinescu and former Colosseum Tournament Bantamweight Championship challenger Adin Panaite took place at the event.

Current Colosseum Tournament Bantamweight Champion Ciprian Sofian faced Victor Alexandru in a non-title bantamweight bout.

=== Results ===
Main card (FightBox)
| Weight class | | | | Method | Round | Time | Notes |
|---|---|---|---|---|---|---|---|
| Welterweight | (Romania) Anghel Cardoş | def. | (Romania) Mădălin Crăciunică | Decision (unanimous) | 4 | 3:00 |
| Featherweight | (Romania) Adrian Maxim | def. | (Romania) Ionuț Popa | Decision (majority) | 4 | 3:00 |
| Bantamweight | (Romania) Iulian Marinescu | def. | (Romania) Adin Panaite | Decision (unanimous) | 3 | 3:00 |
| Lightweight | (Romania) Constantin Holdur | def. | (Romania) Andrei Vasinca | KO (flying knee) | 3 | 2:05 |
| Bantamweight | (Romania) Ciprian Sofian | def. | (Romania) Victor Alexandru | KO (punch) | 1 | 0:19 |
| Welterweight | (Romania) Alexandru Amariței | def. | (Romania) Balázs Bajkó | Decision (unanimous) | 3 | 3:00 |
| Light Heavyweight | (Romania) Cristian-Gabriel Conea | def. | (Romania) Daniel Morar | Decision (unanimous) | 3 | 3:00 |
| Lightweight | (Romania) Robert Guraliuc | def. | (Romania) Andrei Sîrghi | Decision (unanimous) | 4 | 3:00 |
| Featherweight | (Romania) Paul Cornea | def. | (Morocco) Aymane Bourkia | Decision (unanimous) | 3 | 3:00 |
| Lightweight | (Romania) Leonard Morariu | def. | (Romania) Emilian Mocanu | Decision (split) | 3 | 3:00 |

== KO Masters 9 ==
KO Masters 9
- Promotion: KO Masters
- Date: August 17, 2021
- Venue: Ambasad'or
- City: Bucharest, Romania

Event chronology
| Prometheus 1: Cardoş vs. Crăciunică | KO Masters 9 | Colosseum Tournament 26: Cardoș vs. Boiciuc |

KO Masters 9: Ristea vs. Balli was a kickboxing event produced by the KO Masters that took place on August 17, 2021 at Ambasad'or in Bucharest, Romania.

Helmut Duckadam, Ismael Londt and Cătălin Moroșanu made special guest appearances at the event.

=== Background ===
A heavyweight bout between Cristian Ristea and Glory's Muhammed Balli headlined the event.

A lightweight bout between current SUPERKOMBAT Middleweight Champion Amansio Paraschiv and Lofogo Sarour took place as the co-main event.

=== Results ===
Main card (Digi Sport)
| Weight class | | | | Method | Round | Time | Notes |
|---|---|---|---|---|---|---|---|
| Heavyweight | (Romania) Cristian Ristea | def. | (Netherlands) Muhammed Balli | Decision (unanimous) | 3 | 3:00 |
| Lightweight | (Romania) Amansio Paraschiv | def. | (Netherlands) Lofogo Sarour | Decision (unanimous) | 3 | 3:00 | (Note: Originally a majority draw, later overturned to a UD decision win.) |
| Heavyweight | (Romania) Valentin Bordianu | def. | (Netherlands) Ingiohairo Ayo Kani | Decision (unanimous) | 3 | 3:00 |
| Middleweight | (Netherlands) Michael Boapeah | def. | (Romania) Claudiu Alexe | Decision (unanimous) | 3 | 3:00 |
| Welterweight | (Romania) Costin Dinu | def. | (Romania) Paul Cucerzan | TKO (towel thrown) | 2 | 1:09 |
| Middleweight | (Romania) Răzvan Macioi | def. | (Romania) Alin Popescu | TKO (three knockdowns) | 1 | 2:59 |
| Women's Flyweight | (Romania) Andreea Cebuc | def. | (Romania) Monica Bălăşoiu | Decision (unanimous) | 3 | 3:00 |
| Super Bantamweight | (Romania) Ionel Bălan | def. | (Romania) Sebastian Ferche | TKO (three knockdowns) | 1 | 2:48 |

== Colosseum Tournament 26 ==
Colosseum Tournament 26
- Promotion: Colosseum Tournament
- Date: August 20, 2021
- Venue: Corvin Castle
- City: Hunedoara, Romania
- Attendance: 1,000 (Note: Due to the COVID-19 pandemic in Romania, the venue operated at limited capacity.)

Event chronology
| KO Masters 9: Ristea vs. Balli | Colosseum Tournament 26 | Colosseum Tournament 27: Căliniuc vs. Koprivlenski |

Colosseum Tournament 26: Cardoș vs. Boiciuc was a kickboxing outdoor event produced by the Colosseum Tournament that took place on August 20, 2021 at Corvin Castle in Hunedoara, Romania.

Semmy Schilt made a special guest appearance at the event.

=== Background ===
An interim Colosseum Tournament World Welterweight Championship bout between Anghel Cardoș and Flavius Boiciuc headlined the event.

Reigning Colosseum Tournament Middleweight Champion Cosmin Ionescu faced Vladimir Ogorodnicov in a non-title co-main event.

=== Results ===
Main card (FightBox)
| Weight class | | | | Method | Round | Time | Notes |
|---|---|---|---|---|---|---|---|
| Welterweight | (Romania) Flavius Boiciuc | def. | (Romania) Anghel Cardoș | Decision (majority) | 4 | 3:00 | (Note: For the interim Colosseum Tournament World Welterweight Championship.) |
| Super Middleweight | (Romania) Cosmin Ionescu | def. | (Moldova) Vladimir Ogorodnicov | Decision (unanimous) | 3 | 3:00 |
| Middleweight | (Romania) Vasile Amariței | def. | (Moldova) Vasile Borșevschi | TKO (three knockdowns) | 1 | 1:14 |
| Bantamweight | (Romania) Mihai Rusu | def. | (Romania) Adin Panaite | Decision (unanimous) | 3 | 3:00 |
| Heavyweight | (Romania) Răzvan Săndulache | def. | (Romania) Robert Damian | KO (punches) | 1 | 1:12 |
| Super Middleweight | (Romania) Ionuț Busuioc | def. | (Moldova) Ion Chirilov | Decision (unanimous) | 3 | 3:00 |
| Lightweight | (Romania) Marian Lăpușneanu | def. | (Romania) Andrei Băcoanu | KO (punch) | 1 | 2:39 |
| Featherweight | (Romania) Silviu Ionescu | def. | (Romania) Cosmin Stângaciu | KO (punches) | 4 | 1:14 |
| Welterweight | (Romania) Andrei Verde | def. | (Romania) Luca Chermeș | Decision (unanimous) | 3 | 3:00 |
| Welterweight | (Romania) Mario Boboc | def. | (Romania) George Voicu | KO (punch) | 1 | 2:02 |

== Colosseum Tournament 27 ==
Colosseum Tournament 27
- Promotion: Colosseum Tournament
- Date: September 20, 2021
- Venue: Antonio Alexe Arena
- City: Oradea, Romania
- Attendance: 1,000

Event chronology
| Colosseum Tournament 26: Cardoș vs. Boiciuc | Colosseum Tournament 27 | Dynamite Fighting Show 12: Lambagiu vs. Ostrovanu |

Colosseum Tournament 27: Căliniuc vs. Koprivlenski was a kickboxing event produced by the Colosseum Tournament that took place on September 20, 2021 at Antonio Alexe Arena in Oradea, Romania.

=== Background ===
A Colosseum Tournament World Lightweight Championship bout between current champion Sorin Căliniuc (also Colosseum Tournament World Super Lightweight Champion) and former Glory Lightweight Contender Tournament Winner Stoyan Koprivlenski headlined the event.

A super heavyweight bout between hometown hero Alexandru Lungu and Adnan Alić took place at this event.

A Colosseum Tournament World Welterweight Championship bout between the reigning champion Eduard Gafencu and current interim champion Flavius Boiciuc was expected to take place at this event. However, Boiciuc withdrew from the bout for medical reasons and was replaced by Anghel Cardoş. The pairing met previously at Colosseum Tournament 23 in February 2021, when Cardoş won by decision.

=== Results ===
Main card (FightBox)
| Weight class | | | | Method | Round | Time | Notes |
|---|---|---|---|---|---|---|---|
| Lightweight | (Romania) Sorin Căliniuc (c) | def. | (Bulgaria) Stoyan Koprivlenski | Decision (split) | 5 | 3:00 | (Note: For the Colosseum Tournament World Lightweight Championship.) |
| Super Heavyweight | (Romania) Alexandru Lungu | def. | (Serbia) Adnan Alić | Decision (unanimous) | 3 | 3:00 |
| Welterweight | (Romania) Eduard Gafencu (c) | def. | (Romania) Anghel Cardoş | Decision (unanimous) | 5 | 3:00 | (Note: For the Colosseum Tournament World Welterweight Championship.) |
| Featherweight | (Romania) Adrian Maxim | def. | (Romania) Lucian Gherman | TKO (retirement) | 2 | 3:00 |
| Welterweight | (Romania) Mădălin Crăciunică | def. | (Romania) Alexandru Amariței | Decision (unanimous) | 3 | 3:00 |
| Heavyweight | (Romania) Sebastian Lutaniuc | def. | (Romania) Cristian-Gabriel Conea | Decision (majority) | 3 | 3:00 |
| Lightweight | (Romania) Darius Argyo | def. | (Romania) Neculai Bosnea | TKO (towel thrown) | 2 | 1:39 |
| Welterweight | (Romania) Alexandru Iancu | def. | (Romania) Valentin Sachelaru | Decision (unanimous) | 3 | 3:00 |
| Featherweight | (Romania) Alexandru Popescu | def. | (Romania) Raoul Fila | Decision (unanimous) | 3 | 3:00 |

== Dynamite Fighting Show 12 ==
Dynamite Fighting Show 12
- Promotion: Dynamite Fighting Show
- Date: September 22, 2021
- Venue: Lascăr Pană Arena
- City: Baia Mare, Romania
- Attendance: 1,000

Event chronology
| Colosseum Tournament 27: Căliniuc vs. Koprivlenski | Dynamite Fighting Show 12 | Urban Legend 11: Invictus |

Dynamite Fighting Show 12: Lambagiu vs. Ostrovanu (also known as Moroșenii vs. Rest of the World) was a kickboxing and boxing event produced by the Dynamite Fighting Show that took place on September 22, 2021 at Lascăr Pană Arena in Baia Mare, Romania.

=== Background ===
A welterweight bout between former Colosseum Tournament Light Welterweight Champion Florin Lambagiu and former Colosseum Tournament Lightweight Champion Andrei Ostrovanu served as the event headliner.

A middleweight bout between undefeated Bogdan Năstase (who has the longest winning streak in DFS at 10 victories) and two-time European kyokushin karateka champion Ștefan Diță also took place at the event.

=== Results ===
Main card (SportExtra)
| Weight class | | | | Method | Round | Time | Notes |
|---|---|---|---|---|---|---|---|
| Welterweight | (Romania) Florin Lambagiu | def. | (Romania) Andrei Ostrovanu | Decision (unanimous) | 3 | 3:00 |
| Middleweight | (Romania) Bogdan Năstase | def. | (Romania) Ștefan Diță | TKO (referee stoppage) | 2 | 0:48 |
| Heavyweight | (Romania) Ionuț Iancu | def. | (Morocco) Mohamed Seddik | Decision (unanimous) | 3 | 3:00 |
| Super Featherweight | (Romania) Călin Petrișor | def. | (Romania) Vlad Trif | Decision (split) | 3 | 3:00 |
| Heavyweight | (Romania) Ștefan Lătescu | def. | (Russia) Konstantin Gluhov | Decision (unanimous) | 3 | 3:00 |
| Middleweight | (Romania) Claudiu Bădoi | def. | (Netherlands) Guillermo Blokland | TKO (four knockdowns) | 3 | 0:48 |
| Lightweight | (Romania) Cristian Milea | def. | (Hungary) Gábor Görbics | Decision (unanimous) | 3 | 3:00 |
| Heavyweight | (Romania) Florin Matei | def. | (Romania) Marius Munteanu | Decision (unanimous) | 4 | 3:00 |
| Heavyweight | (Romania) Florin Ivănoaie | def. | (Romania) Vlăduț Ungureanu | Decision (unanimous) | 3 | 3:00 |
| Featherweight | (Romania) Ionuț Popa | def. | (Moldova) Serghei Zanosiev | Decision (unanimous) | 3 | 3:00 |

=== Bonus awards ===
The following fighters received crypto bonuses.

- Fight of the Night: Călin Petrișor vs. Vlad Trif
- Performance of the Night: Ionuț Popa and Florin Lambagiu

== Urban Legend 11 ==
Urban Legend 11
- Promotion: Urban Legend
- Date: October 1, 2021
- Venue: Constanța Arena
- City: Constanța, Romania

Event chronology
| Dynamite Fighting Show 12: Lambagiu vs. Ostrovanu | Urban Legend 11 | Pitbull Fighting Network 1: Rusu vs. Panaite |

Urban Legend 11: Invictus was a kickboxing, mixed martial arts and boxing event produced by the Urban Legend that took place on October 1, 2021 at Constanța Arena in Constanța, Romania.

Andrei Stoica made a special guest appearance at the event.

=== Results ===
Main card (Dotto TV)
| Weight class | | | | Method | Round | Time | Notes |
|---|---|---|---|---|---|---|---|
| Junior Welterweight | (Romania) Mădălin Crăciunică | def. | (Romania) Adrian Călin | TKO (retirement) | 1 | 0:42 | (Note: Last Man Standing (Invictus Rules)) |
| Super Welterweight | (Romania) Radu Medeleanu | def. | (Romania) Paul Sadîc | TKO (referee stoppage) | 1 | 1:52 | (Note: Last Man Standing (Invictus Rules)) |
| Bantamweight | (China) Robert Hu Hua Long | def. | (Romania) Alexandru Toma | KO (punches) | 1 | 2:57 | (Note: Last Man Standing (Invictus Rules)) |
| Heavyweight | (Romania) Gabriel Precup | def. | (Romania) Albert Potoceanu | TKO (referee stoppage) | 1 | 3:20 | (Note: Last Man Standing (Invictus Rules)) |
| Featherweight | (Romania) Valentin Mavrodin | def. | (Romania) Andrei Cofei | TKO (towel thrown) | 1 | 1:40 | (Note: Last Man Standing (Invictus Rules)) |
| Welterweight | (Romania) Dacian Bucaluță | def. | (Romania) Robert Trancă | TKO (towel thrown) | 1 | 2:35 | (Note: Last Man Standing (Invictus Rules)) |
| Junior Welterweight | (Romania) Ionuț Mădălin | def. | (Moldova) Valentin Pascali | KO (right hook) | 1 | 2:23 |
| Junior Welterweight | (Romania) Sebastian Lomoșanu | def. | (Romania) Andrei Stoica | Decision (unanimous) | 3 | 3:00 |
| Featherweight | (Romania) Alin Ifrim | def. | (Romania) Ionuț Crivăț | TKO (retirement) | 2 | 0:40 |
| Super Bantamweight | (Romania) Claudiu Brilă | def. | (Romania) David Boșogeanu | Decision (majority) | 4 | 3:00 |

== Pitbull Fighting Network 1 ==
Pitbull Fighting Network 1
- Promotion: Pitbull Fighting Network
- Date: October 8, 2021
- Venue: Fălticeni Arena
- City: Fălticeni, Romania

Event chronology
| Urban Legend 11: Invictus | Pitbull Fighting Network 1 | Colosseum Tournament 28: Amariței vs. Van Oeveren II |

Pitbull Fighting Network 1: Rusu vs. Panaite was a kickboxing event produced by the Pitbull Fighting Network that took place on October 8, 2021 at Fălticeni Arena in Fălticeni, Romania.

=== Background ===
A bantamweight rematch between former Colosseum Tournament Bantamweight Championship challenger Adin Panaite and Mihai Rusu served as the event headliner. They met previously in a bout at Colosseum Tournament 26 on August 20, 2021, where Rusu won by unanimous decision.

=== Results ===
Main card (TVR)
| Weight class | | | | Method | Round | Time | Notes |
|---|---|---|---|---|---|---|---|
| Bantamweight | (Romania) Mihai Rusu | def. | (Romania) Adin Panaite | Decision (unanimous) | 3 | 3:00 |
| Super Middleweight | (Romania) Claudiu Alexe | vs. | (Hungary) Csaba Hocz | Draw | 3 | 3:00 |
| Heavyweight | (Romania) Marian Dinu | def. | (Hungary) Tibor Varga | KO (low kick) | 2 | 2:15 |
| Middleweight | (Romania) Costin Dinu | def. | (Moldova) Dumitru Cavliuc | Decision (unanimous) | 3 | 3:00 |
| Featherweight | (Romania) Rayko Levițchi | def. | (Romania) Ștefan Aștefănoaie | Decision (unanimous) | 3 | 3:00 |
| Lightweight | (Romania) David Constantin | def. | (Moldova) Ufuc Minacov | Decision (unanimous) | 3 | 3:00 |
| Openweight | (Romania) Ionuț Busuioc | def. | (Romania) Andrei Vesa | KO (knee and punches) | 2 | 0:54 |
| Welterweight | (Romania) Denis Ceaușu | def. | (Romania) Lucian Berariu | Decision (unanimous) | 3 | 3:00 |

== Colosseum Tournament 28 ==
Colosseum Tournament 28
- Promotion: Colosseum Tournament
- Date: October 25, 2021
- Venue: Ion Constantinescu Arena
- City: Craiova, Romania
- Attendance: None (behind closed doors)

Event chronology
| Pitbull Fighting Network 1: Rusu vs. Panaite | Colosseum Tournament 28 | Superkombat Universe: Doumbé vs. Emiev |

Colosseum Tournament 28: Amariței vs. Van Oeveren II was a kickboxing event produced by the Colosseum Tournament that took place on October 25, 2021 at Ion Constantinescu Arena in Craiova, Romania.

=== Background ===
A middleweight rematch between Vasile Amariței and Jimi Van Oeveren served as the event headliner. They met previously in a bout at Colosseum Tournament 14 on July 20, 2019, where Van Oeveren pulled off the upset with a second-round KO.

=== Results ===
Main card (FightBox)
| Weight class | | | | Method | Round | Time | Notes |
|---|---|---|---|---|---|---|---|
| Middleweight | (Romania) Vasile Amariței | def. | (Netherlands) Jimi Van Oeveren | Decision (unanimous) | 3 | 3:00 |
| Super Featherweight | (Moldova) Maxim Răilean | def. | (Romania) Andrei Sîrghi | Decision (unanimous) | 3 | 3:00 |
| Welterweight | (Romania) Mădălin Crăciunică | def. | (Romania) Andrei Verde | Decision (majority) | 3 | 3:00 |
| Bantamweight | (Romania) Adin Panaite | def. | (Romania) Daniel Handrea | Decision (majority) | 3 | 3:00 |
| Featherweight | (Romania) Valentin Mavrodin | def. | (Romania) Paul Cornea | TKO (doctor stoppage) | 3 | 0:22 |
| Lightweight | (Romania) Lucian Gherman | def. | (Romania) Mihai Isuf | Decision (unanimous) | 3 | 3:00 |
Preliminary Card
| Lightweight | (Romania) Andrei Ion | def. | (Romania) Samuel Ivan | Decision (unanimous) | 3 | 2:00 |

== Superkombat Universe ==
Superkombat Universe
- Promotion: Superkombat Fighting Championship
- Date: November 1, 2021
- Venue: La Perle
- City: Dubai, UAE
- Attendance: 1,500 (Note: Due to the COVID-19 pandemic in the United Arab Emirates, the venue operated at limited capacity.)

Event chronology
| Colosseum Tournament 28: Amariței vs. Van Oeveren II | Superkombat Universe | OSS Fighters 07: Ristea vs. Tariq |

Superkombat Universe: Doumbé vs. Emiev (also known as Superkombat World Grand Prix in Dubai or as SK 60) was a pay-per-view kickboxing and mixed martial arts event produced by the Superkombat Fighting Championship (SUPERKOMBAT) that took place on November 1, 2021 at La Perle in Dubai, UAE.

=== Background ===
Former two-time Glory Welterweight Champion and Glory's No. 1 pound for pound kickboxer Cédric Doumbé made his promotional debut and MMA debut against Arbi Emiev in a welterweight bout. Four kickboxing title fights also headlined the event.

=== Results ===
Main card (InPlayer)
| Weight class | | | | Method | Round | Time | Notes |
|---|---|---|---|---|---|---|---|
| Welterweight (MMA) | (France) Cédric Doumbé | def. | (Russia) Arbi Emiev | TKO (punches) | 1 | 4:40 |
| Super Lightweight | (Democratic Republic of the Congo) Jonathan Mayezo | def. | (Netherlands) Brown Pinas | Decision (split) | 5 | 3:00 | (Note: For the inaugural Superkombat World Middleweight Plus Championship.) |
| Lightweight | (France) Jimmy Vienot | def. | (Belgium) Arman Ambaryan | Decision (unanimous) | 5 | 3:00 | (Note: For the vacant Superkombat World Middleweight Championship.) |
| Welterweight | (Turkey) Vedat Hödük | def. | (Serbia) Nikola Todorović | Decision (split) | 3 | 3:00 | (Note: For the inaugural Superkombat World Super Middleweight Championship.) |
| Featherweight | (Morocco) Mo Monteur | def. | (France) Eddy Naït-Slimani | KO (left head kick) | 1 | 1:14 | (Note: For the inaugural Superkombat World Super Lightweight Championship.) |
| Heavyweight | (Romania) Cristian Ristea | def. | (United Kingdom) Mustafa Al-Taslaq | Decision (unanimous) | 3 | 3:00 |
| Heavyweight | (Netherlands) Nico Pereira Horta | def. | (Belgium) Nidal Bchiri | Decision (unanimous) | 3 | 3:00 |
| Super Welterweight | (Netherlands) Clyde Brunswijk | def. | (Brazil) Fábio Alberto | Decision (split) | 3 | 3:00 |
| Heavyweight | (Brazil) Jhonata Diniz | def. | (Albania) Asdren Gashi | KO (jumping knee and punch) | 3 | 2:17 |
| Heavyweight | (Portugal) Bruno Susano | def. | (Albania) Luigj Gashi | Decision (unanimous) | 3 | 3:00 |
| Super Welterweight | (Switzerland) Daniel Stefanovski | def. | (Morocco) Taha Alami Marrouni | Decision (unanimous) | 3 | 3:00 |

=== Bonus awards ===
The following fighters have received 50,000 Superkoin bonuses.

- Knockout of the Night: Cédric Doumbé, Mohamed Monteur El Mesbahi and Jhonata Diniz

== OSS Fighters 07 ==
OSS Fighters 07
- Promotion: OSS Fighters
- Date: November 19, 2021
- Venue: Constanța Arena
- City: Constanța, Romania
- Attendance: None (behind closed doors)

Event chronology
| Superkombat Universe: Doumbé vs. Emiev | OSS Fighters 07 | Colosseum Tournament 29: Marinescu vs. Rusu |

OSS Fighters 07: Ristea vs. Osaro was a kickboxing event produced by the OSS Fighters that took place on November 19, 2021 at Constanța Arena in Constanța, Romania.

Cătălin Moroșanu made a special guest appearance at the event.

=== Background ===
A heavyweight rematch between Fabio Kwasi and Cristian Ristea was expected to serve as the initial event headliner. However, Kwasi pulled out due to injury. Mike's Gym's Tariq Osaro replaced Kwasi.

A lightweight bout between the former Colosseum Tournament World Lightweight Champion Cristian Milea and former ISKA Intercontinental Super Welterweight Champion Chris Wunn took place as the co-main event.

=== Results ===
Main card (Digi Sport)
| Weight class | | | | Method | Round | Time | Notes |
|---|---|---|---|---|---|---|---|
| Heavyweight | (Nigeria) Tariq Osaro | def. | (Romania) Cristian Ristea | Decision (unanimous) | 3 | 3:00 |
| Lightweight | (Germany) Chris Wunn | def. | (Romania) Cristian Milea | TKO (doctor stoppage) | 2 | 3:00 |
| Heavyweight | (Romania) Valentin Bordianu | def. | (Romania) Costin Mincu | KO (right hook) | 2 | 1:15 |
| Light Welterweight | (Romania) Ștefan Orza | def. | (Romania) Cezar Buzdugan | Decision (unanimous) | 3 | 3:00 |
| Welterweight | (Italy) Luca Carnevali | def. | (Romania) Mădălin Mogoș | Decision (unanimous) | 3 | 3:00 |
| Featherweight | (Morocco) Said Malek | def. | (Romania) Daniel Dragomir | Decision (unanimous) | 3 | 3:00 |
| Bantamweight | (Romania) Adin Panaite | def. | (Romania) Ionel Bălan | Decision (split) | 3 | 3:00 |
| Middleweight | (Romania) Răzvan Macioi | def. | (Romania) Ionuț Busuioc | Decision (split) | 3 | 3:00 |
| Welterweight | (Romania) Daniel Manole | def. | (Romania) Sebastian Dinu | KO (punches) | 1 | 2:07 |
| Super Flyweight | (Romania) Edmond Mustafa | def. | (China) Robert Hu Hua Long | Decision (unanimous) | 3 | 3:00 |

== Colosseum Tournament 29 ==
Colosseum Tournament 29
- Promotion: Colosseum Tournament
- Date: December 14, 2021
- Venue: Arad Arena
- City: Arad, Romania
- Total gate: 700 (Note: Due to the COVID-19 pandemic in Romania, the venue operated at limited capacity.)

Event chronology
| OSS Fighters 07: Ristea vs. Tariq | Colosseum Tournament 29 | Dynamite Fighting Show 13: Iancu vs. Lătescu II |

Colosseum Tournament 29: Marinescu vs. Rusu was a kickboxing event produced by the Colosseum Tournament that took place on December 14, 2021 at Arad Arena in Arad, Romania.

=== Background ===
A Colosseum Tournament World Bantamweight Championship bout for the vacant title between former ISKA and WKF junior world champion (also former WAKO junior vice-world champion) Iulian Marinescu and unbeaten Mihai Rusu headlined the event. Unbeaten Ciprian Sofian was previously forced to vacate the title due to injury.

Two-division Colosseum Tournament world champion Eduard Gafencu and Colosseum Tournament World Featherweight Champion Cristian Spetcu withdrew from the event due to undisclosed reasons.

A lightweight bout between former KOK Lightweight Champion Vitalie Matei and ISKA World Middleweight Champion Gabriel Bozan was expected to take place as the co-main event. However, Bozan pulled out citing another injury and he was replaced by top welterweight contender Mădălin Crăciunică.

A welterweight bout between multiple world and European kempo champion Mirel Drăgan and Bogdan Takács took place at the event.

=== Results ===
Main card (FightBox)
| Weight class | | | | Method | Round | Time | Notes |
|---|---|---|---|---|---|---|---|
| Bantamweight | (Romania) Iulian Marinescu | def. | (Romania) Mihai Rusu | TKO (corner stoppage) | 2 | 2:03 | (Note: For the vacant Colosseum Tournament World Bantamweight Championship.) |
| Lightweight | (Moldova) Vitalie Matei | def. | (Romania) Mădălin Crăciunică | Decision (unanimous) | 3 | 3:00 |
| Heavyweight | (Romania) Alexandru Lungu | def. | (Netherlands) Vincent Liebregts | TKO (three knockdowns) | 2 | 2:55 |
| Featherweight | (Romania) Silviu Ionescu | def. | (Romania) Alexandru Popescu | Decision (split) | 3 | 3:00 |
| Welterweight | (Romania) Bogdan Takács | def. | (Romania) Mirel Drăgan | Decision (unanimous) | 3 | 3:00 |
| Welterweight | (Romania) Alexandru Amariței | def. | (Moldova) Valentin Pascali | Decision (unanimous) | 3 | 3:00 |
| Heavyweight | (Romania) Cristian Conea | vs. | (Romania) Sebastian Lutaniuc | Draw | 3 | 3:00 |
| Heavyweight | (Romania) Valentin Petruț | def. | (Hungary) Pál Garaguly | KO (punch) | 1 | 0:35 |
| Middleweight | (Romania) Alexandru Ianţoc | vs. | (Moldova) Ion Chirilov | Draw | 3 | 3:00 |
| Welterweight | (Romania) Alexandru Iancu | def. | (Romania) Remus Bortea | Decision (unanimous) | 3 | 3:00 |
| Lightweight | (Romania) Darius Argyo | def. | (Moldova) Vitalie Panainte | Decision (split) | 3 | 3:00 |
| Bantamweight | (Romania) Ruben Onișor | def. | (Romania) Daniel Muțiu | Decision (unanimous) | 3 | 3:00 |

=== Bonus awards ===
- Fighter of the Night: Iulian Marinescu

== Dynamite Fighting Show 13 ==
Dynamite Fighting Show 13
- Promotion: Dynamite Fighting Show
- Date: December 15, 2021
- Venue: Silva Complex
- City: Bucharest, Romania
- Attendance: None (behind closed doors)

Event chronology
| Colosseum Tournament 29: Marinescu vs. Rusu | Dynamite Fighting Show 13 | Prometheus 2: Rusu vs. Dragomir |

Dynamite Fighting Show 13: Iancu vs. Lătescu II (also known as Night of Champions) was an kickboxing event produced by the Dynamite Fighting Show that took place on December 15, 2021 at Silva Complex in Bucharest, Romania.

=== Background ===
A DFS Heavyweight Championship rematch between the current champion Ionuț Iancu and Ștefan Lătescu was slated to serve as the event headliner. They previously met at Dynamite Fighting Show 8, where Iancu won by split decision.

A welterweight bout between the former Colosseum Tournament champion Florin Lambagiu and former Enfusion champion Robin Ciric would have served as the co-main event. However on December 2, Ciric was removed from the contest due to testing positive for COVID-19. He was replaced by the current FEA Welterweight Champion Constantin Rusu.

The event also featured a one-night, four-man featherweight tournament, held to crown the first ever DFS Lightweight Champion. The tournament was the first in the promotion since Dynamite Fighting Show 8.

A welterweight bout between the former Colosseum Tournament Lightweight Champion Andrei Ostrovanu and current FEA Welterweight Champion Constantin Rusu (also former KOK Welterweight Champion) was expected to take place at the event. However on November 26, the bout was pulled due to Ostrovanu testing positive for COVID-19. They are now expected to be rescheduled for a future event.

=== Results ===
Main card (Sport Extra)
| Weight class | | | | Method | Round | Time | Notes |
|---|---|---|---|---|---|---|---|
| Heavyweight | (Romania) Ionuț Iancu (c) | def. | (Romania) Ștefan Lătescu | TKO (three knockdowns) | 2 | 2:01 | (Note: For the DFS Heavyweight Championship.) |
| Welterweight | (Romania) Constantin Rusu | def. | (Romania) Florin Lambagiu | Decision (unanimous) | 3 | 3:00 |
| Featherweight | (Romania) Adrian Maxim | def. | (Romania) Ionuț Popa | Decision | 4 | 3:00 | (Note: Tournament Final to determine the inaugural DFS Lightweight Champion.) |
| Super Welterweight | (France) Diaguely Camara | def. | (Romania) Bogdan Năstase | Decision (split) | 3 | 3:00 |
| Lightweight | (Romania) Alex Bublea | def. | (Portugal) Diogo Neves | Decision (unanimous) | 3 | 3:00 |
| Super Welterweight | (Guinea-Bissau) Bassó Pires | def. | (Romania) Claudiu Bădoi | TKO (injury) | 2 | 2:59 |
| Featherweight | (Romania) Ionuț Popa | def. | (Romania) Călin Petrișor | Decision (split) | 3 | 3:00 | (Note: Tournament Semi-final.) |
| Featherweight | (Romania) Adrian Maxim | def. | (Romania) Serghei Zanosiev | KO (knee) | 2 | 1:49 | (Note: Tournament Semi-final.) |

=== Lightweight Championship bracket ===
Semifinals
(Romania) | Călin Petrișor | 3
(Romania) | Ionuț Popa | SD
(Romania) | Adrian Maxim | KO
(Romania) | Serghei Zanosiev | 2

Finals
(Romania) | Ionuț Popa | 4
(Romania) | Adrian Maxim | MD

=== Bonus awards ===
- Fight of the Night: Ionuț Iancu vs. Ștefan Lătescu

== See also ==
- 2021 in Glory
- 2021 in ONE Championship
- 2021 in K-1
- 2021 in Wu Lin Feng
