= Ciprian Sora =

Romanian kickboxer and Muay Thai practitioner

- Born: October 23, 1976 (age 49); Bucharest, Romania
- Nationality: Romanian
- Division: Heavyweight
- Style: Muay Thai, Kickboxing
- Rank: 3rd dan black belt in Kickboxing
- Years active: 1996–2007

Kickboxing record
- Total: 18
- Wins: 15
- Losses: 2
- By knockout: 2
- Draws: 0
- No contests: 1

Amateur record
- Total: 80
- Wins: 75
- By knockout: 45
- Losses: 5
- Draws: 0

Other information
- Occupation: Kickboxing instructor, sports teacher, former policeman
- Notable students: Semmy Schilt, Errol Zimmerman, Alexandru Lungu, Cristian Spetcu, Mihai Nistor, Raul Cătinaş, Valentino Petrescu, Corneliu Rus, Costel Paşniciuc, Răzvan Ghiţă, Dumitru Ţopai, Dragoş Imbrea, Valentin Bordianu
- Website: cipriansora.ro

Ciprian Sora (born 23 October 1976) is a Romanian kickboxing trainer and founder of the Golden Glory Romania gym in Bucharest. As an athlete, he became the first ever Romanian to win a gold medal at the Muay Thai world championships in 1999 and still holds the record for that. Sora had an amateur record of 75–5, being undefeated in Romania throughout his career before turning professional. He signed with Local Kombat, the future SUPERKOMBAT, in 2004.

== Career ==
Ciprian Sora took up kickboxing and Muay Thai at 14 under the tutelage of Dan Deliu. He began his amateur career in 1996 under the tutelage of shinan Mircea Boldea. Sora came to prominence in 1999 by taking a gold medal at the IAMTF World Championships in Bangkok, Thailand at −86 kg/189 lb, where his cousin Daniel Ghiță also fought and won the bronze medal in another weight category. Having amassed undefeated kickboxing and Muay Thai records in Romania from 1996 to 2003, he turned professional. In 2004 he signed with the largest Romanian kickboxing promotion Local Kombat.

In 2009, he founded the Golden Glory Romania kickboxing gym in Bucharest, Romania. Also present at the ceremony were Semmy Schilt, Dave Jonkers, Bas Boon, Andre Mannaart, Todd Medina and Eduard Irimia. Later were added Muay Thai and Brazilian jiu-jitsu (BJJ) to the gym's repertoire.

== Championships and accomplishments ==
=== Muaythai ===
- International Federation of Muaythai Amateur
  - 1999 IAMTF World Championships −86 kg/189 lb Gold Medalist (gold)
  - 1997 IAMTF World Championships Bronze Medalist (bronze)
  - 1998 IAMTF European Championships Silver Medalist (silver)
  - 2000 IAMTF European Championships Bronze Medalist (bronze)

=== Kickboxing ===
- International Kick Boxing Federation
  - 1997 IKBF World Cup Silver Medalist (silver)
  - 1998 IKBF European Championships Gold Medalist (gold)
- Local Kombat
  - 2007 Fighter of the Year
  - 2007 Most Technical Fighter of the Year
- World Kickboxing Network
  - 2007 WKN Romania Heavyweight Championship

== Personal life ==
He has not got along with his cousin Daniel Ghiță since 2012 when he received Semmy Schilt at his academy to train for the Glory 4: Tokyo grand slam. Ghiță accused Sora of training Schilt for him, the two being in the same heavyweight pyramid and later even meeting in the final.

Sora holds a 3rd dan black belt in kickboxing.

== Kickboxing record ==
Kickboxing record
15 wins, 2 losses (2 KOs), 0 draws
Date	Result	Opponent	Event	Location	Method	Round	Time	Record
2008-03-15	Win	(Spain) Damián García	Local Kombat 29	Arad, Romania	Decision	3	3:00	15-2
2007-12-14	Win	(Lithuania) Vadim Gridiajev	Local Kombat 28	Brașov, Romania	KO	2	1:58	14-2
2007-06-15	Loss	(Czech Republic) Petr Vondráček	Local Kombat 26	Iași, Romania	KO (high kick)	1	0:15	13-2
2007-03-02	Loss	(Czech Republic) Petr Vondráček	Local Kombat 25	Sibiu, Romania	KO (punches)	1	2:08	13-1
2006-11-11	NC	(Romania) Cătălin Zmărăndescu	Local Kombat 23	Râmnicu Vâlcea, Romania	No contest	3	0:47	13-0
2006-04-14	Win	(Romania) Cătălin Zmărăndescu	Local Kombat 20	Râmnicu Vâlcea, Romania	Decision (unanimous)	5	3:00	13-0
Won the WKN Romania Heavyweight Championship.
2005-11-11	Win	(Hungary) Péter Varga	Local Kombat 17	Braşov, Romania	Decision	3	3:00	12-0
2005-07-22	Win	(Germany) Karl Glischynski	Local Kombat 15	Galați, Romania	Decision	3	3:00	11-0
2004-09-11	Win	(Romania) Alexandru Vitenco	Local Kombat 9	Constanța, Romania	KO	1	0:27	10-0
2004-05-14	Win	(Romania) Liviu Iușan	Local Kombat 6	Galați, Romania	KO (punch)	2	1:45	9-0
2004-02-04	Win	(Romania) Nicu Stanciu	Local Kombat 4	Braşov, Romania	KO	2	2:12	8-0
Legend: Win Loss Draw/No contest Notes

== See also ==
- List of male kickboxers
