= Cătălin Zmărăndescu =

Romanian mixed martial artist, kickboxer and boxer

- Born: January 26, 1973 (age 53); Bucharest, Romania
- Nationality: Romanian
- Height: 6 ft 1 in (1.85 m)
- Weight: 249 lb (113 kg; 17 st 11 lb)
- Division: Heavyweight
- Reach: 73.0 in (185 cm)
- Style: Boxing, Wushu, Kickboxing
- Years active: 1997-2018

Kickboxing record
- Total: 14
- Wins: 11
- By knockout: 6
- Losses: 1
- Draws: 1
- No contests: 1

Other information
- Boxing record from BoxRec
- Mixed martial arts record from Sherdog

Cătălin Zmărăndescu
Medal record

Representing Romania

Men's Sanda

World Championships
Silver medal – second place	1999 Hong Kong	85 kg
Bronze medal – third place	2003 Macau	90 kg

Cătălin Zmărăndescu (born 26 January 1973) is a former Romanian professional mixed martial artist, kickboxer and boxer.

== Kickboxing record ==
Kickboxing record
11 wins (6 (T) KO's), 1 loss, 1 draw
Date	Result	Opponent	Event	Location	Method	Round	Record
2006-11-11	NC	(Romania) Ciprian Sora	Local Kombat 23	Râmnicu Vâlcea, Romania	No contest		11-1-1
2006-04-14	Loss	(Romania) Ciprian Sora	Local Kombat 20	Râmnicu Vâlcea, Romania	Decision		11-1-1
2006-03-10	Win	(Bulgaria) Stanislav Batchevanov	Local Kombat 19	Iași, Romania	Decision		11-0-1
2005-11-11	Win	(Australia) Josip Bodrožić	Local Kombat 17	Brașov, Romania	Decision		10-0-1
2005-05-27	Win	(Netherlands) Jan Wessels	Total Kombat 5	Tulcea, Romania	TKO (leg kicks)		9-0-1
2005-02-04	Win	(Romania) Ciprian Popa	Total Kombat 3	Pitești, Romania	KO (knee)		8-0-1
2004-12-17	Win	(Spain) Cristian Delgado	Total Kombat 2	Bacău, Romania	Decision		7-0-1
2004-11-04	Draw	(Belgium) Brecht Wallis	Total Kombat 1	Brașov, Romania	Decision		6-0-1
2004-08-06	Win	(Hungary) Tamás Fehér	Gala Antena 1	Timișoara, Romania	KO (right hook)		6-0-0
2004-06-10	Win	(Sweden) Hayes Jemide	Extrem Kung Fu 3	Bucharest, Romania	Decision		5-0-0
2004-05-14	Win	(Romania) Gheorghe Lazăr	Local Kombat 6	Galați, Romania	KO (punches)		4-0-0
2004-03-26	Win	(Hungary) Gábor Koza	Local Kombat 5	Brașov, Romania	KO (knee to the body)		3-0-0
2003-08-23	Win	(Romania) Aurel Bococi	Local Kombat 1	Ploiești, Romania	Decision		2-0-0
2003-06-20	Win	(Germany) Goran Vidaković	Provocarea Campionilor	Bucharest, Romania	KO		1-0-0
Legend: Win Loss Draw/No contest Notes

== Mixed martial arts record ==
Professional record breakdown
17 matches	11 wins	6 losses
By knockout	8	4
By submission	2	1
By decision	1	1
Draws	0	
No contests	0	

Cătălin Zmărăndescu mixed martial arts record
Res.	Record	Opponent	Method	Event	Date	Round	Time	Location	Notes
Loss	11–6	John Demmel	TKO (Punches)	UCMMA 45 – Ultimate Challenge MMA 45	7 November 2015	1	1:28		
Win	11–5	Tomasz Czerwiński	TKO (Punches)	WCMMA – Warrior Challenge 21	17 July 2015	1	0:55		
Win	10–5	Ben Schneider	TKO (Punches)	UCMMA 40 – Ultimate Challenge MMA 40	6 September 2014	1	1:30		
Win	9–5	Marvin Campbell	TKO (Punches)	UCMMA 39 – Ultimate Challenge MMA 39	3 May 2014	1	3:00		
Loss	8–5	Arvydas Juska	TKO (Knees and Punches)	UCMMA 38 – Ultimate Challenge MMA 38	1 February 2014	2	1:28		
Win	8–4	Vince Lucero	TKO (Punches)	IFC MMA – Revolution: UK vs. USA	9 March 2013	1	2:19		
Win	7–4	Dave Rintoul	Submission	IFC – Christmas Bash	15 December 2012	1	2:00		
Loss	6–4	Mark Godbeer	TKO (Corner Stoppage)	BAMMA 9 – Watson vs. Marshman	24 March 2012	1	5:00		
Loss	6–3	Jarno Nurminen	Submission (Punches)	Cage 16 – 1st Defense	8 October 2011	1	2:25		
Win	6–2	Sharif Mohammed Ali	Submission (Front Choke)	BAMMA 6 – Watson vs. Rua	21 May 2011	1	0:32		
Loss	5–2	Kamen Georgiev	Decision (Unanimous)	Local Kombat – Romania vs. Bulgaria	16 July 2010	2	5:00		
Loss	5–1	Valentijn Overeem	KO (Knee)	K-1: World GP 2010 Bucharest	21 May 2010	1	0:40		
Win	5–0	Erni Strmonja	TKO (Doctor Stoppage)	Obrăcun U Ringu 10 – OR 10	27 March 2010	1	0:56		
Win	4–0	Marian Visan	TKO (Punches)	Strike FC 3 – Noaptea Demonilor	31 October 2008	1	0:58		
Win	3–0	Tom Clemens	Decision (Unanimous)	Strike FC 2 – Mamaia	1 August 2008	2	5:00		
Win	2–0	Houston Smith	TKO (Punches)	Invincible – A Means to an End	21 June 2008	2	1:54		
Win	1–0	Steve Sayegh	TKO (Punches)	Strike FC – Night of Gladiators	18 April 2008	1	0:00		

== See also ==
- List of male mixed martial artists
- List of male kickboxers
