= 2024 in Romanian kickboxing =

Information
- First date: March 29, 2024
- Last date: December 22, 2024

The 2024 season is the 22nd season of competitive kickboxing in Romania.

== List of events ==
| # | Event Title | Date | Arena | Location |
|---|---|---|---|---|
| 1 | Dynamite Fighting Show 22 | March 29, 2024 | Lascăr Pană Arena | Baia Mare, Romania |
| 2 | Road to DFS 3 | Apr 26, 2024 | Târgoviște Arena | Târgoviște, Romania |
| 3 | Road to DFS 4 | May 10, 2024 | Horia Demian Arena | Cluj-Napoca, Romania |
| 4 | Colosseum Tournament 42 | May 24, 2024 | Olimpia Arena | Ploiești, Romania |
| 5 | Dynamite Fighting Show 23 | Jun 7, 2024 | TeraPlast Arena | Bistrița, Romania |
| 6 | GFC 8 | Jun 7, 2024 | Galați Ice Rink | Galați, Romania |
| 7 | Fight Zone 11 | Jun 30, 2024 | Deva Arena | Deva, Romania |
| 8 | Colosseum Tournament 43 | Jun 28, 2024 | Suceava Fortress | Suceava, Romania |
| 9 | Road to DFS 5 | Jul 20, 2024 | Satu Mare Arena | Satu Mare, Romania |
| 10 | Colosseum Tournament 44 | Sep 27, 2024 | Dumitru Popescu-Colibași Arena | Brașov, Romania |
| 11 | Dynamite Fighting Show 24 | Oct 11, 2024 | Târgu Jiu Arena | Târgu Jiu, Romania |
| — | Colosseum Tournament 45 (Postponed) | Nov 30, 2024 | London Hilton | London, England |
| 12 | Dynamite Fighting Show 25 | Dec 6, 2024 | Oradea Arena | Oradea, Romania |

== Dynamite Fighting Show 22 ==
Dynamite Fighting Show 22
- Promotion: Dynamite Fighting Show
- Date: March 29, 2024
- Venue: Lascăr Pană Arena
- City: Baia Mare, Romania
- Attendance: 3,000

Event chronology
| DFS 21 | Dynamite Fighting Show 22 | Road to DFS 3 |

Dynamite Fighting Show 22 was a kickboxing and boxing event produced by the Dynamite Fighting Show that took place on March 29, 2024 at the Lascăr Pană Arena in Baia Mare, Romania.

=== Background ===
A one night, eight-man lightweight tournament took place at the event. The winner of this tournament Valentin Mavrodin secured an ISKA world title shot later in the season.

Remy Bonjasky was a special guest.

=== Results ===
Main card (Sport Extra Player)
| Weight class | | | | Method | Round | Time | Notes |
|---|---|---|---|---|---|---|---|
| Welterweight | (Romania) Andrei Ostrovanu | def. | (United States) Omar Moreno | KO (punches) | 2 | 2:56 | (Note: For the vacant ISKA Intercontinental Super Middleweight Championship.) |
| Lightweight | (Romania) Valentin Mavrodin | def. | (Romania) Marian Lăpușneanu | TKO (three knockdowns) | 1 | 1:13 | (Note: Tournament Final to determine the inaugural DFS Middleweight Champion.) |
| Heavyweight | (Romania) Ionuț Iancu | def. | (Netherlands) Brian Douwes | Decision (unanimous) | 3 | 3:00 |
| Lightweight | (Romania) Marian Lăpușneanu | def. | (Romania) Alex Bublea | Decision (unanimous) | 3 | 3:00 | (Note: DFS Lightweight Grand Prix Semifinal.) |
| Lightweight | (Romania) Valentin Mavrodin | def. | (Romania) Andrei Varga | Decision (unanimous) | 3 | 3:00 | (Note: DFS Lightweight Grand Prix Semifinal.) |
| Middleweight | (Romania) Alex Negrea | def. | (Netherlands) Guillermo Blokland | KO (low kicks) | 1 | 0:26 |
| Heavyweight | (Romania) Sebastian Lutaniuc | def. | (Romania) Marius Munteanu | Decision (split) | 3 | 3:00 |
| Lightweight | (Romania) Alex Bublea | def. | (Romania) Costel Șchiopu | Decision (unanimous) | 3 | 3:00 | (Note: DFS Lightweight Grand Prix Quarterfinal.) |
| Lightweight | (Romania) Marian Lăpușneanu | def. | (Romania) Marius Cimpoieru | Decision (unanimous) | 3 | 3:00 | (Note: DFS Lightweight Grand Prix Quarterfinal.) |
| Lightweight | (Romania) Valentin Mavrodin | def. | (Romania) Darius Argyo | Decision (unanimous) | 3 | 3:00 | (Note: DFS Lightweight Grand Prix Quarterfinal.) |
| Lightweight | (Romania) Andrei Varga | def. | (Romania) Adrian Maxim | Decision (unanimous) | 3 | 3:00 | (Note: DFS Lightweight Grand Prix Quarterfinal.) |

== Colosseum Tournament 42 ==
Colosseum Tournament 42
- Promotion: Colosseum Tournament
- Date: May 24, 2024
- Venue: Olimpia Arena
- City: Ploiești, Romania

Colosseum Tournament 42 was a kickboxing and boxing event produced by the Colosseum Tournament that took place on May 24, 2024, at the Olimpia Arena in Ploiești, Romania.

=== Results ===
Main card (FightBox)
| Weight class | | | | Method | Round | Time | Notes |
|---|---|---|---|---|---|---|---|
| Bantamweight | (Romania) Daniel Dragomir | def. | (Greece) Petros Athanasiou | Decision (split) | 3 | 3:00 |
| Heavyweight | (Romania) Cosmin Ionescu | def. | (Romania) Florin Ghiță | TKO (referee stoppage) | 1 | 2:34 | (Note: For the interim Colosseum Tournament World Heavyweight Championship.) |
| Lightweight | (Romania) Artin Agopian | def. | (Iran) Mohammad Haselmehri | KO (hook) | 2 | 1:18 |
| Bantamweight | (Romania) Iulian Marinescu | def. | (Romania) Claudiu Brilă | Decision (unanimous) | 3 | 3:00 |
| Middleweight | (Romania) Alex Panțîru | def. | (Romania) David Alesu | Decision (unanimous) | 3 | 3:00 |
| Bantamweight | (Romania) Cosmin Brumă | def. | (Romania) Eduard Mihailă | Decision (unanimous) | 3 | 3:00 |
| Cruiserweight | (Romania) Adrian Mincă | def. | (Romania) Lorenzo Stoica | TKO (doctor stoppage) | 2 | 1:38 |

== Dynamite Fighting Show 23 ==
Dynamite Fighting Show 23
- Promotion: Dynamite Fighting Show
- Date: June 7, 2024
- Venue: TeraPlast Arena
- City: Bistrița, Romania
- Attendance: 4,000

Dynamite Fighting Show 23: Descendants of Dracula was a kickboxing event produced by the Dynamite Fighting Show that took place on June 7, 2024 at the TeraPlast Arena in Bistrița, Romania.

=== Background ===
A one night, four-man welterweight tournament took place at the event. The winner of this tournament secured an ISKA world title shot later in the season.

Remy Bonjasky and Peter Aerts made special guest appearances at the event.

=== Results ===
Main card (Warrior Code)
| Weight class | | | | Method | Round | Time | Notes |
|---|---|---|---|---|---|---|---|
| Welterweight | (Romania) Andrei Leuștean | def. | (Romania) Andrei Ostrovanu | Decision (unanimous) | 3 | 3:00 | (Note: Tournament Final to determine the new DFS Welterweight Champion.) |
| Light Heavyweight | (Hungary) Balázs Kiss | def. | (Romania) Sebastian Lutaniuc | Decision (split) | 3 | 3:00 |
| Featherweight | (Romania) Ionuț Popa | def. | (Germany) Ramzi Odris | Disqualification | 1 | 2:35 | (Note: For the ISKA Intercontinental Light Welterweight Championship.) |
| Lightweight | (Romania) Călin Petrișor | def. | (Romania) Alex Bublea | Decision (unanimous) | 3 | 3:00 |
| Heavyweight | (Romania) Marius Munteanu | def. | (Hungary) Sándor Kertész | Decision (unanimous) | 3 | 3:00 |
| Lightweight | (Romania) Andrei Varga | def. | (Romania) Bogdan Suru | KO (right hook) | 1 | 1:18 |
| Heavyweight | (Romania) Ilie Brancu | def. | (Hungary) Tibor Varga | KO (low kicks) | 1 | 0:54 |
| Cruiserweight | (Romania) Ionuț Busuioc | def. | (Romania) Marius Rotaru | Ext. R Decision | 4 | 3:00 |
| Welterweight | (Romania) Andrei Ostrovanu | def. | (Romania) Alex Andreescu | Decision (unanimous) | 3 | 3:00 | (Note: DFS Lightweight Grand Prix Semifinal.) |
| Welterweight | (Romania) Andrei Leuștean | def. | (Romania) Costin Dinu | Decision (unanimous) | 3 | 3:00 | (Note: DFS Lightweight Grand Prix Semifinal.) |
Preliminary Card
| Middleweight | (Romania) Vasile Cotelea | def. | (Netherlands) Marciano Aerts | Decision (unanimous) | 3 | 3:00 |

== Colosseum Tournament 43 ==
Colosseum Tournament 43
- Promotion: Colosseum Tournament
- Date: June 28, 2024
- Venue: Suceava Fortress
- City: Suceava, Romania
- Attendance: 2,500

Colosseum Tournament 43 was an outdoor kickboxing event produced by the Colosseum Tournament that took place on June 28, 2024, at the Suceava Fortress in Suceava, Romania.

Semmy Schilt made special guest appearance at the event.

=== Results ===
Main card (FightBox/TrillerTV)
| Weight class | | | | Method | Round | Time | Notes |
|---|---|---|---|---|---|---|---|
| Featherweight | (Romania) Bogdan Floriștean (c) | vs. | (Moldova) Dmitrii Sîrbu | No contest (accidental headbutt) | 1 | 1:33 | (Note: For the Colosseum Tournament World Featherweight Championship.) |
| Bantamweight | (Romania) Mihai Rusu | def. | (Morocco) Brahim Akdi | Decision (unanimous) | 3 | 3:00 | (Note: Tournament Final to determine the inaugural Colosseum Tournament New Heroes Bantamweight Champion.) |
| Lightweight | (Romania) Constantin Holdur | def. | (Moldova) Vasile Cecan | Decision (split) | 3 | 3:00 |
| Women's Featherweight | (Morocco) Ibtissam Kassrioui | def. | (Netherlands) Jaleesa Alfons | Decision (unanimous) | 3 | 3:00 | (Note: Colosseum Tournament World Women's Featherweight Championship Eliminator.) |
| Welterweight | (Belgium) Gilles Duflou | def. | (Romania) Bogdan Slabu | Decision (unanimous) | 3 | 3:00 |
| Light Heavyweight | (Romania) Răzvan Hurjui | def. | (Romania) Marian Olaru | KO (jumping knee) | 1 | 1:02 | (Note: Fight for Charity) |
| Women's Flyweight | (Romania) Cristina Răduț | vs. | (Romania) Liliana Amariței | Draw | 3 | 3:00 |
| Bantamweight | (Morocco) Brahim Akdi | def. | (Romania) Alex Popescu | Decision (split) | 3 | 3:00 | (Note: Colosseum Tournament Bantamweight Grand Prix Semifinal.) |
| Bantamweight | (Romania) Mihai Rusu | def. | (Romania) Ștefan Drujă | Decision (split) | 3 | 3:00 | (Note: Colosseum Tournament Bantamweight Grand Prix Semifinal.) |

== Colosseum Tournament 44 ==
Colosseum Tournament 44
- Promotion: Colosseum Tournament
- Date: September 27, 2024
- Venue: Dumitru Popescu-Colibași Arena
- City: Brașov, Romania
- Attendance: 2,200

Colosseum Tournament 44 was a kickboxing and mixed martial arts event produced by the Colosseum Tournament that took place on September 27, 2024, at the Dumitru Popescu-Colibași Arena in Brașov, Romania.

=== Results ===
Main card (FightBox)
| Weight class | | | | Method | Round | Time | Notes |
|---|---|---|---|---|---|---|---|
| Bantamweight | (Romania) Daniel Dragomir (c) | vs. | (Romania) Iulian Marinescu | Draw | 5 | 3:00 | (Note: For the Colosseum Tournament World Bantamweight Championship.) |
| Heavyweight | (Romania) Alin Nechita | def. | (Netherlands) Winfried Jops | Decision (unanimous) | 3 | 3:00 |
| Featherweight | (Romania) Paul Cornea | def. | (Romania) Alex Popescu | Decision (unanimous) | 5 | 3:00 | (Note: For the vacant Colosseum Tournament New Heroes Featherweight Championship.) |
| Featherweight | (Romania) Bogdan Floriștean | def. | (Romania) Cătălin Makove | Decision (unanimous) | 3 | 3:00 |
| Welterweight | (Romania) Alex Panțîru | def. | (Romania) Ovidiu Mereț | Decision (unanimous) | 3 | 3:00 |
| Light Heavyweight | (Netherlands) Victor De Koning | def. | (Romania) Ştefan Veber | Decision (unanimous) | 3 | 3:00 |
| Welterweight | (Romania) David Alesu | def. | (Romania) Mihnea Babău | TKO (leg injury) | 1 | 0:50 |
| Featherweight | (Romania) Dan Popa | def. | (Iran) Mohammad Haselmehri | KO (right punch) | 1 | 2:02 |
| Bantamweight | (Romania) Sebastian Gal | def. | (Romania) Eduardo Maradin | Decision (majority) | 3 | 3:00 |

== Dynamite Fighting Show 24 ==
Dynamite Fighting Show 24
- Promotion: Dynamite Fighting Show
- Date: October 11, 2024
- Venue: Târgu Jiu Arena
- City: Târgu Jiu, Romania
- Attendance: 2,500

Dynamite Fighting Show 24 was a kickboxing event produced by the Dynamite Fighting Show that took place on October 11, 2024 at the Târgu Jiu Arena in Târgu Jiu, Romania.

Remy Bonjasky made special guest appearance at the event.

=== Background ===
A one night, eight-man tournament took place at the event. The winner of the tournament secured an ISKA world title shot later in the season.

Valentin Mavrodin and Călin Petrișor fought in a unification bout with the DFS middleweight and ISKA world super welterweight titles on the line.

=== Results ===
Main card (Warrior Code)
| Weight class | | | | Method | Round | Time | Notes |
|---|---|---|---|---|---|---|---|
| Lightweight | (Romania) Valentin Mavrodin (c) | def. | (Romania) Călin Petrișor | Decision (unanimous) | 5 | 3:00 | (Note: For DFS middleweight and ISKA world super welterweight titles) |
| Cruiserweight | (Romania) Sebastian Lutaniuc | def. | (Romania) Ionuț Busuioc | Decision (unanimous) | 3 | 3:00 | (Note: DFS Cruiserweight Grand Prix Final. For inaugural DFS cruiserweight title) |
| Middleweight | (Romania) Bogdan Năstase | vs. | (Greece) Alexandros Chrysochoidis | Draw | 3 | 3:00 |
| Openweight | (Spain) Vajtan Shanava | def. | (Romania) Claudiu Bădoi | Decision (unanimous) | 3 | 3:00 |
| Cruiserweight | (Romania) Ionuț Busuioc | def. | (Romania) Dănuț Hurduc | Decision (majority) | 3 | 3:00 | (Note: DFS Cruiserweight Grand Prix Semifinal. Hurduc deducted 1 point.) |
| Cruiserweight | (Romania) Sebastian Lutaniuc | def. | (Romania) Marius Rotaru | Decision (unanimous) | 3 | 3:00 | (Note: DFS Cruiserweight Grand Prix Semifinal.) |
| Women's Bantamweight | (Romania) Denisa Vulpe | def. | (Romania) Cristina Răduț | Decision (unanimous) | 3 | 3:00 |
| Cruiserweight | (Romania) Ionuț Busuioc | def. | (Romania) Alex Vîrlan | Decision (split) | 3 | 3:00 | (Note: DFS Cruiserweight Grand Prix Quarterfinal.) |
| Cruiserweight | (Romania) Dănuț Hurduc | def. | (Romania) Costi Mocanu | KO (liver punch) | 1 | 2:05 | (Note: DFS Cruiserweight Grand Prix Quarterfinal.) |
| Cruiserweight | (Romania) Marius Rotaru | def. | (Romania) Gabriel Bodescu | Decision (unanimous) | 3 | 3:00 | (Note: DFS Cruiserweight Grand Prix Quarterfinal.) |
| Cruiserweight | (Romania) Sebastian Lutaniuc | def. | (Romania) Alessio Sârbu | Decision (unanimous) | 3 | 3:00 | (Note: DFS Cruiserweight Grand Prix Quarterfinal.) |
| Lightweight | (Romania) Andrei Varga | def. | (Netherlands) Damian Johansen | Decision (unanimous) | 3 | 3:00 |

== Colosseum Tournament 45 ==
Colosseum Tournament 45
- Promotion: Colosseum Tournament
- Date: November 30, 2024 (postponed)
- Venue: London Hilton
- City: London, England

Colosseum Tournament 45: Night of Champions was a planned kickboxing event produced by the Colosseum Tournament originally planned to take place on November 30, 2024, at the London Hilton in London, England.

Semmy Schilt was expected to make special guest appearance at the event.

Colosseum Tournament president would announce on November 27 that the event will be postponed until the first quarter of 2025.

=== Background ===
A Colosseum Tournament World Super Welterweight Championship bout for the vacant title between former Glory Welterweight Champion Harut Grigorian and former Enfusion World Middleweight Champion Mohammad Ghaedi was expected to headline the event.

Current Colosseum Tournament World Bantamweight Champion Daniel Dragomir was expected to face former Enfusion World Bantamweight Champion Matthew Daalman in a three-round non-title bantamweight bout.

=== Results ===
Main card (FightBox/Sky Sports)
| Weight class | | | | Method | Round | Time | Notes |
|---|---|---|---|---|---|---|---|
| Super Welterweight | (Belgium) Harut Grigorian | vs. | (Romania) Alex Amariței | | | | (Note: For the vacant Colosseum Tournament World Welterweight Championship.) |
| Bantamweight | (Romania) Daniel Dragomir (c) | vs. | (Netherlands) Matthew Daalman |
| Heavyweight | (Romania) Alin Nechita (c) | vs. | (Morocco) Ouail ibn Youssef |
| Light Heavyweight | (Morocco) Nabil Balikane | vs. | (Netherlands) Victor De Koning |
| Heavyweight | (Romania) Cosmin Ionescu | vs. | (Morocco) Tarik Cherkaoui |
| Lightweight | (Morocco) Mohammed Fathi | vs. | (Netherlands) Abdelali Elhessaini |
| Welterweight | (Suriname) Rudsel Zinhagel | vs. | (Spain) Álex Fernández Grau |

== Dynamite Fighting Show 25 ==
Dynamite Fighting Show 25
- Promotion: Dynamite Fighting Show
- Date: December 6, 2024
- Venue: Oradea Arena
- City: Oradea, Romania
- Attendance: 6,000

Dynamite Fighting Show 25: Colossal Battle was a kickboxing event produced by the Dynamite Fighting Show that took place on December 6, 2024 at the Oradea Arena in Oradea, Romania.

=== Results ===
Main card (Warrior Code)
| Weight class | | | | Method | Round | Time | Notes |
|---|---|---|---|---|---|---|---|
| Heavyweight | (Romania) Alex Lungu | def. | (Romania) Cristian Anheliuc | Decision (unanimous) | 3 | 2:00 |
| Welterweight | (Cameroon) Brice Kombou | def. | (Romania) Andrei Leuștean | TKO (three knockdowns) | 4 | 1:58 | (Note: For ISKA World Super Middleweight Championship.) |
| Featherweight | (Portugal) Vinicius Bereta | def. | (Romania) Adrian Maxim | Decision (split) | 3 | 3:00 |
| Openweight | (Romania) Bogdan Năstase | def. | (Romania) Anatoli Ciumac | Decision (unanimous) | 3 | 3:00 |
| Cruiserweight | (Romania) Sebastian Lutaniuc | def. | (Greece) Vasilis Ozy | Decision (unanimous) | 5 | 3:00 | (Note: For ISKA World Cruiserweight Championship.) |
| Welterweight | (Romania) Andrei Ostrovanu | def. | (France) Steven Mendès | Decision (unanimous) | 3 | 3:00 |
| Openweight | (Romania) Claudiu Bădoi | def. | (Brazil) Rodrigo Mineiro | TKO (referee stoppage) | 3 | 1:49 |
| Heavyweight | (Romania) Valentin Bordianu | def. | (Romania) Valentin Petruț | TKO (arm injury) | 2 | 0:57 |
| Lightweight | (Romania) Andrei Varga | def. | (Romania) Darius Argyo | Decision (unanimous) | 3 | 3:00 |
| Heavyweight | (Romania) Vasile Corcodel | def. | (Romania) Remus Bortea | Decision (unanimous) | 3 | 3:00 |

== See also ==
- 2024 in Glory
- 2024 in ONE Championship
- 2024 in K-1
- 2024 in RISE
- 2024 in Wu Lin Feng
