= Cristian Ristea =

Romanian professional kickboxer (born 1992)

- Born: Cristian Ristea; February 9, 1992 (age 34); Găești, Romania
- Other names: The Gladiator
- Height: 1.93 m (6 ft 4 in)
- Weight: 100.1 kg (221 lb; 15.76 st)
- Division: Heavyweight
- Style: Kickboxing
- Stance: Orthodox
- Fighting out of: Bucharest, Romania
- Team: Benny Fight Academy
- Years active: 2009 – present

Kickboxing record
- Total: 74
- Wins: 46
- By knockout: 22
- Losses: 28
- By knockout: 15
- Draws: 0

Other information
- Spouse: Mihaela Ristea
- Last updated on: October 28, 2026

Cristian Ristea (born February 9, 1992) is a Romanian professional kickboxer, currently competing in the heavyweight division of GLORY. He also competed for Dynamite Fighting Show (DFS), Golden Fighter Championship (GFC), Superkombat Fighting Championship, KO Masters and Enfusion. He is the current GFC Intercontinental Heavyweight Champion.

Ristea is ranked the #2 light heavyweight in the world by Enfusion Live. As of May 2020, Ristea was ranked the #5 heavyweight in the world by Enfusion Live.

As of 31 December 2025, Ristea is ranked the #11 heavyweight kickboxer in the world by Boxemag.

== Kickboxing career ==
Ristea fought Florent Kaouachi for the vacant ISKA World Heavyweight K1 title. Kaouachi won the fight by a fourth round TKO.

He fought Vladimir Toktasynov during the OSS Fighter 4 event. Ristea won the fight by a unanimous decision.

Ristea fought Jürgen Dolch during Mix Kombat 5. He won the fight by TKO, after knocking Dolch down three times in the first round.

Ristea took part in the 2020 OSS Fighters Heavyweight tournament. In the quarter finals he knocked Thomas Froschauer out with a right hook. In the semifinals he defeated Marco Pisu by a unanimous decision. Ristea lost the final bout to Fabio Kwasi by a third round TKO.

Ristea was scheduled to fight Pavel Zhuravlev at FEA: Reset on March 13, 2021, for the FEA Heavyweight title. However, Zhuravlev pulled out of the fight citing a bicep injury. He was replaced by Kirill Kornilov. Kornilov won the fight by a second-round knockout.

=== GLORY ===
On June 19, 2023, it was announced that Ristea had signed a deal with Glory.

Ristea took part in the Glory 99 “Heavyweight Last Man Standing Tournament” where 32 heavyweight fighters competed on April 5, 2025 in Rotterdam, Netherlands. He faced Jamal Ben Saddik, losing via unanimous decision.

Ristea fought Mory Kromah at Glory 103, in a non-tournament bout. He lost via TKO due to a nose injury in the second round.

== Championships and accomplishments ==
- Fightarena World Series
  - FAC Heavyweight Championship (One time, current)
- Golden Fighter Championship
  - GFC Intercontinental Heavyweight Championship (One time, current)
- OSS Fighters
  - OSS Fighters 05 Heavyweight Tournament Runner Up
- Local Kombat
  - Local Kombat National Light Heavyweight Plus Championship (One time)
- Dynamite Fighting Show
  - Fight of the Night (One time) vs. Thomas Froschauer
- Kickboxing Romania Awards
  - 2025 Warrior Spirit

== Professional kickboxing record ==
Professional kickboxing record
46 Wins, 28 Losses, 0 Draws
Date	Result	Opponent	Event	Location	Method	Round
2026-10-28	Win	(Turkey) Serdar Eroğlu	Colosseum Tournament 51	Bucharest, Romania	Decision	3
Colosseum Tournament World Heavyweight Title Eliminator.
2026-10-09	Loss	(Romania) Florin Lambagiu	K-1 World GP -90kg Preliminary in Iași	Iași, Romania	Decision (unanimous)	3
2026-02-07	Loss	(Azerbaijan) Bahram Rajabzadeh	Glory 105	Arnhem, Netherlands	KO (Punches)	1
2025-08-23	Loss	(Guinea) Mory Kromah	Glory 103	Rotterdam, Netherlands	TKO (nose injury)	2
2025-04-05	Loss	(Morocco) Jamal Ben Saddik	Glory 99 - Last Heavyweight Standing, Opening Round	Rotterdam, Netherlands	Decision (Unanimous)	3
2024-09-07	Loss	(Serbia) Rade Opačić	SENSHI 23	Varna, Bulgaria	Decision (Unanimous)	3
2024-04-20	Loss	(Greece) Giannis Stoforidis	SENSHI 21	Varna, Bulgaria	TKO (Punches)	1
2023-12-15	Win	(Germany) Vladimir Toktasynov	KOK 118 World Series	Berlin, Germany	KO (body hook)	2
Won the FAC Heavyweight Championship.
2023-09-22	Loss	(Romania) Florin Ivănoaie	Dynamite Fighting Show 20 - Heavyweight Championship Tournament, Semi Finals	Bucharest, Romania	Decision (Unanimous)	3
2023-08-19	Loss	(Serbia) Nikola Filipović	Glory 87	Rotterdam, Netherlands	Decision (Split)	3
2023-05-13	Win	(Romania) Marius Munteanu	Dynamite Fighting Show 19 - Heavyweight Championship Tournament, Quarter Finals	Buzău, Romania	TKO (referee stoppage)	3
2022-10-19	Win	(Italy) Florin Matei	Dynamite Fighting Show 16	Iași, Romania	Decision (unanimous)	3
2022-09-10	Win	(Romania) Ionuț Iancu	Best of the Best 1	Brăila, Romania	Decision (split)	5
Won the vacant GFC Intercontinental Heavyweight Championship.
2022-07-22	Loss	(Romania) Florin Ivănoaie	Clash of the Titans 24	Târgoviște, Romania	TKO (towel thrown)	4
2022-06-20	Win	(Turkey) Kaan Murat İnanır	KO Masters 10	Bucharest, Romania	TKO (towel thrown)	1
2021-11-19	Loss	(Nigeria) Tariq Osaro	OSS Fighters 07	Constanța, Romania	Decision (unanimous)	3
2021-11-01	Win	(United Kingdom) Mustafa Al-Taslaq	Superkombat Universe	Dubai, UAE	Decision (unanimous)	3
2021-08-17	Win	(Netherlands) Muhammed Balli	KO Masters 9	Bucharest, Romania	Decision (unanimous)	3
2021-07-16	Win	(Netherlands) Nico Pereira Horta	OSS Fighters 06	Constanța, Romania	Decision (split)	3
2021-03-13	Loss	(Russia) Kirill Kornilov	FEA World GP: Reset	Chișinău, Moldova	KO (right hook)	2
For the FEA Heavyweight Championship.
2020-02-07	Loss	(Netherlands) Fabio Kwasi	OSS Fighters 05, Final	Bucharest, Romania	TKO (referee stoppage)	3
OSS Fighters Heavyweight tournament final.
2020-02-07	Win	(Italy) Marco Pisu	OSS Fighters 05, Semi Finals	Bucharest, Romania	Decision (unanimous)	3
2020-02-07	Win	(Austria) Thomas Froschauer	OSS Fighters 05, Quarter Finals	Bucharest, Romania	KO (right hook)	2
2019-12-07	Win	(Germany) Jürgen Dolch	Mix Kombat 5	Bistrița, Romania	TKO (referee stoppage/3 knockout rule)	1
2019-11-21	Win	(Austria) Thomas Froschauer	Dynamite Fighting Show 6	Iași, Romania	Decision (split)	3
2019-10-05	Loss	(Belgium) Mohamed El Bouchaibi	Battle Arena Series	Waregem, Belgium	TKO (eye injury)	2
2019-08-22	Win	(Russia) Vladimir Toktasynov	OSS Fighters 04	Mamaia, Romania	Decision (unanimous)	3
2019-06-06	Win	(Netherlands) Eldar Oliveira	Dynamite Fighting Show 4	Cluj-Napoca, Romania	Decision (unanimous)	3
2019-04-13	Loss	(Netherlands) Nidal Bchiri	Enfusion #82	Orchies, France	Decision	3
2019-02-28	Win	(Ukraine) Yurii Chornoivanenko	OSS Fighters 03	Bucharest, Romania	Decision	3
2018-10-27	Loss	(Russia) Кirill Kornilov	Tatneft Cup 2018, Semi Finals	Kazan, Russia	Decision	4
2018-08-24	Win	(Russia) Аdel Zaripov	Tatneft Cup 2018	Kazan, Russia	TKO (referee stoppage/3 knockdown rule)	1
2018-07-05	Win	(Montenegro) Miroslav Vujović	Dynamite Fighting Show 1	Bucharest, Romania	Decision (split)	3
2018-05-31	Loss	(Russia) Igor Darmeshkin	Tatneft Cup 2018	Kazan, Russia	Decision	4
2018-02-24	Loss	(Algeria) Florent Kaouachi	K1 Event 11	Troyes, France	TKO	4
For the ISKA World Heavyweight K-1 Championship.
2017-09-06	Loss	(Russia) Aleksandr Grinchuk	Tatneft Cup 2017	Kazan, Russia	TKO (referee stoppage/punches)	4
2017-05-06	Loss	(United Kingdom) Dawid Żółtaszek	SUPERKOMBAT World Grand Prix II 2017	Madrid, Spain	KO (punches)	2
2017-04-07	Win	(United Kingdom) Dawid Żółtaszek	SUPERKOMBAT World Grand Prix I 2017	Bucharest, Romania	Extra round decision	4
2017-03-22	Win	(Germany) Gordon Haupt	Tatneft Cup 2017	Kazan, Russia	Decision	3
2016-05-07	Loss	(Romania) Dănuț Hurduc	SUPERKOMBAT World Grand Prix	Bucharest, Romania	Decision (unanimous)	3
2015-06-19	Loss	(Netherlands) Gökhan Gedik	SUPERKOMBAT World Grand Prix	Constanța, Romania	KO (overhand right)	2
2015-05-23	Win	(France) Reda Oudgou	SUPERKOMBAT World Grand Prix	Bucharest, Romania	Decision (split)	3
2015-03-07	Loss	(Netherlands) Clyde Brunswijk	SUPERKOMBAT World Grand Prix	Ploiești, Romania	Decision (unanimous)	3
2014-06-21	Loss	(Spain) Moisés Baute	SUPERKOMBAT World Grand Prix, Semi Finals	Constanța, Romania	KO (punch to the body)	3
2014-05-24	Win	(Germany) Christian Brorhilker	SUPERKOMBAT World Grand Prix	Mamaia, Romania	TKO (referee stoppage)	3
2014-03-29	Win	(Italy) Romano Romasco	SUPERKOMBAT New Heroes	Ploiești, Romania	KO (right hook)	2
2013-12-20	Win	(Romania) Izidor Bunea	Full Fight	Sfântu Gheorghe, Romania	Decision (unanimous)	3
2013-11-03	Loss	(Netherlands) Fabian Gondorf	SUPERKOMBAT New Heroes	Carrara, Italy	TKO (leg injury)	3
2013-09-28	Win	(Brazil) Romelleo da Silva	SUPERKOMBAT World Grand Prix	Botoșani, Romania	Decision (unanimous)	3
2013-08-30	Win	(Romania) Ștefan Szomoru	SUPERKOMBAT New Heroes	Târgoviște, Romania	KO (right hook)	1
2013-08-03	Loss	(Romania) Ciprian Șchiopu	Pitbull Challenge	Rădăuți, Romania	Decision	3
2013-03-02	Loss	(Romania) Flavius Boiciuc	Respect Gym	Găești, Romania	TKO (referee stoppage)	3
2012-12-07	Win	(Romania) Alexandru Nedelcu	Local Kombat	Onești, Romania	Decision (split)	3
Won the vacant Local Kombat National Light Heavyweight Plus Championship.
2012-10-05	Win	(Romania) Mihai Vicențiu	Romanian Xtreme Fighting	Târgoviște, Romania	TKO (referee stoppage)	1
2012-08-15	Win	(Romania) Izidor Bunea	RFC - Noaptea Campionilor	Uricani, Romania	Decision	3
2012-06-08	Loss	(Romania) Daniel Alexandru	Local Kombat	Craiova, Romania	TKO (doctor stoppage/eye injury)	3
2012-03-30	Loss	(Romania) Alexandru Nedelcu	Local Kombat	Târgu Jiu, Romania	Decision (split)	3
2012-03-30	Win	(Romania) Radu Pralea	Local Kombat	Târgu Jiu, Romania	Decision (unanimous)	3
2011-12-17	Win	(Romania) Ionuț Jipa	Romanian Xtreme Fighting	Brașov, Romania	TKO (retirement)	4
2011-09-03	Loss	(Romania) Sorin Vesa	Challenge Fight	Rieni, Romania	Decision	3
2011-07-01	Win	(Romania) Răzvan Popescu	Golden League	Târgoviște, Romania	Decision	3
Legend: Win Loss Draw/No contest Notes

== See also ==
- List of male kickboxers
