= Dynamite Fighting Show =

Romanian mixed martial arts promotion company

- Type: Private
- Industry: Combat sports
- Founded: 2018; 8 years ago
- Founder: Cătălin Moroșanu
- Headquarters: Bucharest, Romania
- Key people: Cătălin Moroșanu, President; Alin Huiu, Managing Director
- Website: http://dynamitefighting.com

The Dynamite Fighting Show (DFS) is a Romanian kickboxing, Muay Thai, mixed martial arts (MMA), boxing, kyokushin and taekwondo promotion company based in Bucharest, Romania, which is owned by veteran heavyweight star Cătălin Moroșanu. It is the most popular combat sports and kickboxing promotion company in Romania. Former head of media and marketing for SUPERKOMBAT Alin Huiu has been managing director since its inception.

It promoted the first sanctioned professional event in the Romanian capital on July 5, 2018, when DFS promoted the "super fight" between Moroșanu and Freddy Kemayo.

In Romania, it can be seen on Pro TV and Pro X. On 5 March 2020 DFS started airing live events on Sport Extra with the debut event on Sport Extra being Dynamite Fighting Show 7.

It has a strategic partnership with ISKA.

In May 2022, DFS signed a distribution agreement with five American networks. The partnership through United Fight Alliance will have 120 broadcasts on NBC Sports, AT&T, Stadium, NSN and Ocean 7 WXVO in the United States.

== History ==
Following the dissolution of the largest continental and popular Superkombat Fighting Championship, several new promotions started to dominate the scene in Romania. The professional kickboxing industry lacked a viable competitor to Colosseum Tournament which Cătălin Moroșanu attempted to fill with the formation of Dynamite Fighting Show.

=== Ratings ===
Also enjoying the popularity of Cătălin Moroșanu, after the dissolution of the SUPERKOMBAT it became the most popular combat sports promotion in the country.

In 2018, after Pro TV and its subsidiary Pro X ended the partnership with SUPERKOMBAT, together with the Dynamite Fighting Show they announced a multi-year broadcast deal.

The promotion's first broadcast television event was DFS 1: Moroșanu vs. Kemayo. In the main event, Cătălin Moroșanu and Freddy Kemayo met for the third time in the kickboxing ring. Moroșanu dominated the bout, leading to a unanimous decision victory.

The broadcast scored a 7.3 rating and 30 share, making it the most watched combat sports event in the past 7 years. The main event peaked with a share of 40.2 in the 18-49 demographic.

== DFS Events ==
DFS's first event, Dynamite Fighting Show 1, took place on July 5, 2018. Each DFS event contains several fights.

#	Event	Date	Venue	Location	Attendance
32	Dynamite Fighting Show 27	Jun 8, 2025	Lascăr Pană Arena	Baia Mare, Romania	
31	Dynamite Fighting Show 26	Mar 7, 2025	Traian Arena	Râmnicu Vâlcea, Romania	3,000
30	Dynamite Fighting Show 25	Dec 6, 2024	Oradea Arena	Oradea, Romania	6,000
29	Dynamite Fighting Show 24	Oct 11, 2024	Târgu Jiu Arena	Târgu Jiu, Romania	2,500
28	Dynamite Fighting Show 23	Jun 7, 2024	TeraPlast Arena	Bistrița, Romania	4,000
27	Dynamite Fighting Show 22	March 29, 2024	Lascăr Pană Arena	Baia Mare, Romania	3,000
26	Road to DFS 4	May 10, 2024	Horia Demian Arena	Cluj-Napoca, Romania	
25	Road to DFS 3	Apr 26, 2024	Târgoviște Arena	Târgoviște, Romania	
24	Dynamite Fighting Show 22	March 29, 2024	Lascăr Pană Arena	Baia Mare, Romania	3,000
23	Dynamite Fighting Show 21: The Grand Finale	December 15, 2023	Galați Ice Arena	Galați, Romania	5,000
22	Dynamite Fighting Show 20: The Moment of Truth 2	September 22, 2023	Bucharest Arena	Bucharest, Romania	4,500
21	Road to DFS 2	June 3, 2023	Târgoviște Arena	Târgoviște, Romania	
20	Dynamite Fighting Show 19: Red Alert in Buzău	May 15, 2023	Romeo Iamandi Arena	Buzău, Romania	3,000
19	Dynamite Fighting Show 18: Final Fight	March 12, 2023	Constantin Jude Arena	Timișoara, Romania	2,200
18	Road to DFS 1	January 28, 2023	Palasport di Torino	Turin, Italy	5,000
17	Dynamite Fighting Show 17: Night of Champions	December 8, 2022	Sala Polivalentă	Constanța, Romania	
16	Dynamite Fighting Show 16: Heavyweight Invasion	October 19, 2022	Sala Polivalentă	Iași, Romania	
15	Dynamite Fighting Show 15: Stoica vs. Tevette	June 24, 2022	Romeo Iamandi Arena	Buzău, Romania	2,600
14	Dynamite Fighting Show 14: Capital Fight 2	May 6, 2022	Sala Rapid	Bucharest, Romania	2,000
13	Dynamite Fighting Show 13: Night of Champions	December 15, 2021	Complex Silva	Bucharest, Romania	0
12	Dynamite Fighting Show 12: Moroșanus vs. Rest of the World	September 22, 2021	Lascăr Pană Arena	Baia Mare, Romania	1,000 (Note: Due to the COVID-19 pandemic, the venue operated at limited capacity.)
11	Dynamite Fighting Show 11: Moment of Truth	June 4, 2021	Complex Silva	Bucharest, Romania	0
10	Dynamite Fighting Show 10: Day of the Warriors	March 10, 2021	Complex Silva	Bucharest, Romania	0
9	Dynamite Fighting Show 9: Day of Revenge	December 4, 2020	Horia Demian Arena	Cluj-Napoca, Romania	0
8	Dynamite Fighting Show 8: Capital Fight	August 20, 2020	Arenele Romane	Bucharest, Romania	0
7	Dynamite Fighting Show 7: David vs. Goliath 2	March 5, 2020	Sala Polivalentă	Arad, Romania	2,150
6	Dynamite Fighting Show 6: David vs. Goliath	November 21, 2019	Sala Polivalentă	Iași, Romania	2,500
5	Dynamite Fighting Show 5: Team Moroșanu vs. Team Bonjasky	September 27, 2019	Sala Polivalentă	Piatra Neamț, Romania	4,000
4	Dynamite Fighting Show 4: Moroșanu vs. Sam	June 6, 2019	Horia Demian Arena	Cluj-Napoca, Romania	3,000
3	Dynamite Fighting Show 3: Oltenia Burns	December 14, 2018	Sala Polivalentă	Craiova, Romania	5,000
2	Dynamite Fighting Show 2: Battle of Moldavia	October 19, 2018	Sala Polivalentă	Piatra Neamț, Romania	4,500
1	Dynamite Fighting Show 1: Moroșanu vs. Kemayo	July 5, 2018	Sala Polivalentă	Bucharest, Romania	4,300

== Tellur Cup ==
Since its founding in 2019, Tellur Cup for junior kickboxers under-18 has served as a farm system (developmental territory) for DFS's future main roster. The competition takes place in the ring, but also on the tatami. The winners usually receive a scholarship consisting of participating in the ISKA World Championships. 2019 winners Ștefan Lătescu and Marko Dușinschi their professional debuts in 2020 and 2021 respectively.

#	Event	Date	Venue	Location	Winners
2	Cupa Tellur II	March 22, 2020	Sala Sporturilor Unirea	Dobroești, Romania	Postponed due to the COVID-19 pandemic
1	Cupa Tellur II	September 21, 2019	Sala Sporturilor Unirea	Dobroești, Romania	Ștefan Lătescu, Iulian Marinescu, Marko Dușinschi

== Champions ==
=== DFS Heavyweight Championship ===
No.	Name	Event	Date	Defenses
1	(Romania) Sebastian Cozmâncă def. Valentin Bordianu	Dynamite Fighting Show 2: Battle of Moldavia; Piatra Neamț, Romania	October 19, 2018	
Cozmâncă vacated the title when he left Dynamite Fighting Show for the Colosseum Tournament.
2	(Romania) Ionuț Iancu def. Sebastian Lutaniuc	Dynamite Fighting Show 8: Capital Fight; Bucharest, Romania	August 20, 2020	1. def. Ștefan Lătescu at Dynamite Fighting Show 13: Night of Champions on December 15, 2021

=== DFS Super Middleweight Championship ===
Weight limit: 77 kg

No.	Name	Event	Date	Defenses
1	(Romania) Florin Lambagiu def. Ștefan Orza	Dynamite Fighting Show 21; Galați, Romania	December 15, 2023	

=== DFS Middleweight Championship ===
Weight limit: 70 kg

No.	Name	Event	Date	Defenses
1	(Romania) Valentin Mavrodin def. Marian Lăpușneanu	Dynamite Fighting Show 22; Baia Mare, Romania	March 29, 2024	1. def. Călin Petrișor at Dynamite Fighting Show 24 on October 11, 2024

=== DFS Lightweight Championship ===
No.	Name	Event	Date	Defenses
1	(Romania) Adrian Maxim def. Ionuț Popa	Dynamite Fighting Show 13: Night of Champions; Bucharest, Romania	December 15, 2021	

== Notable fighters ==
=== Kickboxing ===
- (Romania) Cătălin Moroșanu
- (Romania) Andrei Stoica
- (Romania) Bogdan Stoica
- (Romania) Amansio Paraschiv
- (Romania) Sebastian Cozmâncă
- (Romania) Florin Lambagiu
- (Romania) Ștefan Lătescu
- (Romania) Ionuț Iancu
- (Romania) Eduard Gafencu
- (Romania) Cristian Ristea
- (Romania) Ștefan Orza
- (Romania) Adrian Maxim
- (Romania) Călin Petrișor
- (Romania) Andreea Cebuc
- (Romania) Andrei Ostrovanu
- (Romania) Bogdan Năstase
- (Romania) Ionuț Popa
- (Romania) Vlad Trif
- (Romania) Alex Bublea
- (Romania) Cristian Milea
- (Romania) Claudiu Bădoi
- (Romania) Andrei Leuştean
- (Romania) Alex Filip
- (Romania) Daniel Corbeanu
- (Moldova) Constantin Rusu
- (France) Freddy Kemayo
- (France) Diaguely Camara
- (France) Majid Amarouche
- (France) Assane Bafet
- (France) Frangis Front Goma
- (Portugal) Bruno Susano
- (Portugal) Bassó Pires
- (Portugal) Diogo Neves
- (Netherlands) Chico Kwasi
- (Netherlands) Colin George
- (Morocco) Said Malek
- (Belgium) Frank Rubanguka
- (Switzerland) Daniel Stefanovski
- (United Kingdom) Daniel Sam

=== Mixed martial arts ===
- (Romania) Ion Pascu
- (Romania) Anatoli Ciumac

=== Boxing ===
- (Romania) Benjamin Adegbuyi
- (Romania) Mihai Nistor
- (Romania) Flavius Biea

=== Kyokushin ===
- (Ukraine) Eldar Ismailov

=== Taekwondo ===
- (Ukraine) Artem Byelov

== See also ==
- Superkombat Fighting Championship
- Colosseum Tournament
- Golden Fighter Championship
