= 2022 in Romanian kickboxing =

Information
- First date: March 25, 2022
- Last date: December 27, 2022

The 2022 season was the 20th season of competitive kickboxing in Romania.

== List of events ==
#	Event Title	Date	Arena	Location
1	Prometheus 2	Mar 25, 2022	Olimpia Arena	Ploiești, Romania
2	UFT 9	Mar 25, 2022	Horia Demian Arena	Cluj-Napoca, Romania
3	Colosseum Tournament 30	Apr 8, 2022	Baltiska Hall	Malmö, Sweden
4	Urban Legend 12	Apr 29, 2022	EGO Ballroom	Constanța, Romania
5	Dynamite Fighting Show 14	May 6, 2022	Rapid Hall	Bucharest, Romania
6	Fight Zone 8	May 8, 2022	Deva Arena	Deva, Romania
7	Colosseum Tournament 31	May 9, 2022	Victoria Arena	Arad, Romania
8	Cezar WC 1	May 14, 2022	CENT Hall	Baia Mare, Romania
9	Colosseum Tournament 32	Jun 3, 2022	Craiova Arena	Craiova, Romania
10	KO Masters 10	Jun 20, 2022	Berăria H	Bucharest, Romania
11	Colosseum Tournament 33	Jun 23, 2022	Bucharest Arena	Bucharest, Romania
12	Dynamite Fighting Show 15	Jun 24, 2022	Romeo Iamandi Arena	Buzău, Romania
13	Confruntarea Titanilor 24	Jul 22, 2022	Târgoviște Arena	Târgoviște, Romania
14	UFT 10	Aug 12, 2022	Satu Mare Arena	Satu Mare, Romania
15	Colosseum Tournament 34	Aug 18, 2022	Dumitru Popescu-Colibași Arena	Brașov, Romania
16	Prometheus 3	Sep 1, 2022	Dej Arena	Dej, Romania
17	Best of the Best 1	Sep 10, 2022	Danubius Arena	Brăila, Romania
18	Colosseum Tournament 35	Sep 30, 2022	Târgoviște Arena	Târgoviște, Romania
19	Dynamite Fighting Show 16	Oct 19, 2022	Iași Arena	Iași, Romania
20	Colosseum Tournament 36	Oct 21, 2022	Elisabeta Lipă Arena	Botoșani, Romania
21	Urban Legend 13	Nov 11, 2022	La Scoica Land	Mamaia, Romania
22	Colosseum Tournament 37	Nov 21, 2022	Romeo Iamandi Arena	Buzău, Romania
23	Dynasty Fight Night	Nov 25, 2022	Apollo Sports Center	Bucharest, Romania
24	GWS 1	Nov 26, 2022	Sandro Pertini Sports Center	Milan, Italy
25	Fight Zone 9	Dec 4, 2022	Deva Arena	Deva, Romania
26	Dynamite Fighting Show 17	Dec 8, 2022	Constanța Arena	Constanța, Romania
27	Urban Legend 14	Dec 27, 2022	La Scoica Land	Mamaia, Romania

== Prometheus 2 ==
Prometheus 2
- Promotion: Prometheus Fighting Promotion
- Date: March 25, 2022
- Venue: Olimpia Arena
- City: Ploiești, Romania
- Attendance: 1,200

Event chronology
Dynamite Fighting Show 13: Iancu vs. Lătescu II	Prometheus 2	UFT 9

Prometheus 2: Rusu vs. Dragomir was a kickboxing event produced by the Prometheus Fighting Promotion that took place on March 25, 2022, at the Olimpia Arena in Ploiești, Romania.

=== Results ===
Main card (FightBox)
Weight class				Method	Round	Time	Notes
Bantamweight	(Romania) Daniel Dragomir	def.	(Romania) Mihai Rusu	Decision (unanimous)	3	3:00
Welterweight	(Romania) Alexandru Amariței	def.	(Romania) Ionuț Mădălin Maxim	KO (head kick)	1	1:24
Heavyweight	(Romania) Sebastian Lutaniuc	def.	(Romania) Florin Matei	Decision (unanimous)	3	3:00
Welterweight	(Romania) Mirel Drăgan	def.	(Romania) Alexandru Gaca	KO (liver kick)	1	1:09
Heavyweight	(Romania) Ilie Brancu	def.	(Romania) Daniel Morar	TKO (nose injury)	1	3:00
Welterweight	(Romania) Andrei Verde	def.	(Romania) Alexandru Bogoș	Decision (unanimous)	3	3:00
Featherweight	(Romania) Paul Cornea	def.	(Romania) Andrei Sîrghi	TKO (retirement)	3	3:00
Bantamweight	(Romania) Daniel Handrea	def.	(Romania) Claudiu Brilă	Decision (majority)	3	3:00
Lightweight	(Romania) Robert Guraliuc	def.	(Romania) Marian-Florin Soare	KO (knee to the head)	1	0:20
Featherweight	(Romania) Bogdan Floriștean	def.	(Romania) Valentin Mavrodin	Decision (majority)	3	3:00

== UFT 9 ==
UFT 9
- Promotion: Ultimate Fighting Tournament
- Date: March 25, 2022
- Venue: Horia Demian Arena
- City: Cluj-Napoca, Romania

Event chronology
Prometheus 2: Rusu vs. Dragomir	UFT 9	Colosseum Tournament 30: Căliniuc vs. Lamiri

UFT 9 was a kickboxing and mixed martial arts event produced by the Ultimate Fighting Tournament that took place on March 25, 2022, at the Horia Demian Arena in Cluj-Napoca, Romania.

=== Results ===
Main card (Sport Extra Player)
Weight class				Method	Round	Time	Notes
Lightweight	(Romania) Lucian Gherman	def.	(Romania) Costel Șchiopu	Decision (unanimous)	3	3:00	(Note: UFT 9 Tournament Final.)
Featherweight	(Romania) Marko Dușinschi	def.	(Romania) Cristian Neacșu	Decision (unanimous)	3	3:00
Welterweight	(Romania) Daniel Moldoveanu	def.	(Romania) Adrian Vodă	Decision (unanimous)	3	3:00
Middleweight	(Romania) Ionuț Busuioc	def.	(Romania) David Anton	Decision (unanimous)	3	3:00
Lightweight	(Romania) Costel Șchiopu	def.	(Morocco) Aymane Bourkia	Decision (split)	3	3:00	(Note: UFT 9 Tournament Semifinals.)
Lightweight	(Romania) Lucian Gherman	def.	(Romania) Florin Orzac	Decision (unanimous)	3	3:00	(Note: UFT 9 Tournament Semifinals.)

== Colosseum Tournament 30 ==
Colosseum Tournament 30
- Promotion: Colosseum Tournament
- Date: April 8, 2022
- Venue: Baltiska Hall
- City: Malmö, Sweden
- Attendance: 1,500

Event chronology
UFT 9	Colosseum Tournament 30	Urban Legend 12: Crăciunică vs. Leviţchi

Colosseum Tournament 30: Căliniuc vs. Lamiri was a kickboxing event produced by the Colosseum Tournament that took place on April 8, 2022, at the Baltiska Hall in Malmö, Sweden.

Singer Oana Radu made special guest appearances at the event.

=== Background ===
A Colosseum Tournament World Lightweight Championship bout between current champion Sorin Căliniuc and former Kunlun Fight World Lightweight Champion Dzianis Zuev was expected to headline the event. However, due to the 2022 Russian invasion of Ukraine, Zuev was removed from the card as a result of the Swedish federation banning Russian and Belarusian athletes. As a result, Zuev was replaced by Andre Mannaart's Sami Lamiri (Mejiro Gym).

A non-title welterweight bout between two-division Colosseum Tournament champion Eduard Gafencu and Joakim Hägg co-headlined the event.

A featherweight bout between DFS Lightweight Champion Adrian Maxim and Amir El-dakkak took place at the event.

Current Colosseum Tournament World Bantamweight Champion Iulian Marinescu faced Nicholas Bryant in a non-title bantamweight bout.

A lightweight bout between former KOK Lightweight Champion Vitalie Matei and Robbie Daniels was scheduled for the event.

=== Results ===
Main card (FightBox)
Weight class				Method	Round	Time	Notes
Lightweight	(Romania) Sorin Căliniuc	def.	(Netherlands) Sami Lamiri	Decision (unanimous)	3	3:00
Welterweight	(Sweden) Joakim Hägg	def.	(Romania) Eduard Gafencu	Decision (unanimous)	3	3:00
Featherweight	(Romania) Adrian Maxim	def.	(Sweden) Amir Bislimi El-Dakkak	Decision (unanimous)	3	3:00
Bantamweight	(Sweden) Nicholas Bryant	def.	(Romania) Iulian Marinescu	Decision (split)	3	3:00
Lightweight	(Moldova) Vitalie Matei	def.	(Sweden) Robbie Daniels	KO (right hand)	2	2:22
Middleweight	(Romania) Vasile Amariței	def.	(Poland) Artur Tyulparov	TKO (three knockdowns)	2	1:12
Featherweight	(Iraq) Nasim Kazem	def.	(Sweden) Rahil Abdur	Decision (unanimous)	3	3:00
Women's Flyweight	(Sweden) Livia Nygaard	def.	(Romania) Maria Nițescu	Decision (unanimous)	3	3:00

== Urban Legend 12 ==
Urban Legend 12
- Promotion: Urban Legend
- Date: April 29, 2022
- Venue: EGO Ballroom
- City: Mamaia, Constanța, Romania
- Attendance: 1,000

Event chronology
Colosseum Tournament 30: Căliniuc vs. Lamiri	Urban Legend 12	DFS 14: Bogdan vs. Badr

Urban Legend 12: Crăciunică vs. Leviţchi was a kickboxing and boxing event produced by the Urban Legend that took take place on April 29, 2022, at the EGO Ballroom in Mamaia, Constanța, Romania.

Andrei Stoica made special guest appearances at the event.

=== Results ===
Main card (Dotto TV)
Weight class				Method	Round	Time	Notes
Super Lightweight	(Romania) Mădălin Crăciunică (c)	def.	(Romania) Rayko Leviţchi	TKO (retirement)	2	3:00	(Note: For the Urban Legend Super Lightweight Championship.)
Heavyweight	(Romania) Vlăduț Ungureanu	def.	(Moldova) Igor Cazak	TKO (referee stoppage)	1	2:18
Super Lightweight	(Moldova) Valentin Pascali	def.	(Romania) Ovidiu Jaluba	Decision (unanimous)	3	3:00
Lightweight	(Romania) Ionuț Chirchiboi	def.	(Romania) Mihail Hanec	Decision	3	3:00
Super Lightweight	(Romania) Fabian Popa	def.	(Romania) Sebastian Lomoşanu	Decision	3	3:00
Bantamweight	(Romania) Claudiu Brilă	def.	(Romania) Ilker Sali	Decision	3	3:00
Flyweight	(Romania) Eduardo Maradin	def.	(Romania) Mario Paraschiv	Decision	3	3:00

== Dynamite Fighting Show 14 ==
Dynamite Fighting Show 14
- Promotion: Dynamite Fighting Show
- Date: May 6, 2022
- Venue: Rapid Hall
- City: Bucharest, Romania
- Attendance: 2,000

Event chronology
Urban Legend 12: Crăciunică vs. Leviţchi	Dynamite Fighting Show 14	Fight Zone 8: Gladiator Night

Dynamite Fighting Show 14: Bogdan vs. Badr (also known as Capital Fight 2) was a kickboxing event produced by the Dynamite Fighting Show that took place on May 6, 2022, at the Rapid Hall in Bucharest, Romania.

In May 2022, DFS also signed distribution agreement with NBC Sports, AT&T, Stadium, NSN and Ocean 7 WXVO networks in the US.

Peter Aerts made special guest appearances at the event.

=== Background ===
A heavyweight bout between former SUPERKOMBAT and Enfusion world champion Bogdan Stoica and Peter Aerts's Badr Ferdaous headlined the event.

A welterweight bout between former Colosseum Tournament World Light Welterweight Champion Florin Lambagiu and former WKN Intercontinental Champion Bassó Pires took place as the co-main event.

=== Results ===
Main card (Sport Extra Player)
Weight class				Method	Round	Time	Notes
Heavyweight	(Romania) Bogdan Stoica	def.	(Netherlands) Badr Ferdaous	TKO (three knockdowns)	1	2:29
Welterweight	(Romania) Florin Lambagiu	def.	(Portugal) Bassó Pires	TKO (towel thrown)	4	1:54
Super Welterweight	(Romania) Claudiu Bădoi	def.	(Turkey) Mükremin Güler	KO (left hook)	1	0:42
Super Welterweight	(Ivory Coast) Assane Bafeta	def.	(Romania) Bogdan Năstase	Decision (unanimous)	3	3:00
Heavyweight	(Romania) Florin Ivănoaie	def.	(Romania) Valentin Bordianu	Decision (split)	3	3:00
Light Heavyweight	(Romania) Ștefan Lătescu	def.	(France) Frangis Front Goma	Decision (unanimous)	3	3:00
Welterweight	(Romania) Ștefan Orza	def.	(Romania) Andrei Ostrovanu	Decision (unanimous)	3	3:00
Featherweight	(Romania) Călin Petrișor	def.	(France) Mitch Farel	Decision (unanimous)	3	3:00

== Fight Zone 8 ==
Fight Zone 8
- Promotion: Fight Zone
- Date: May 8, 2022
- Venue: Deva Arena
- City: Deva, Romania

Event chronology
DFS 14: Bogdan vs. Badr	Fight Zone 8	Colosseum Tournament 31: Gafencu vs. Gontineac

Fight Zone 8 (also known as Gladiator Night) was a kickboxing, mixed martial arts and boxing event produced by the Fight Zone that took place on May 8, 2022, at the Deva Arena in Deva, Romania.

Cătălin Moroșanu and Ionuț Iancu made special guest appearances at the event.

=== Results ===
Main card (TomTix Player)
Weight class				Method	Round	Time	Notes
Heavyweight	(Romania) Cristian-Gabriel Conea	def.	(Romania) Ion Grigore	Extra round decision	4	3:00
Heavyweight	(Romania) Marius Munteanu	def.	(Romania) Marian Dinu	TKO (towel thrown)	2	0:46
Super Middleweight	(Romania) Fery Alionte	def.	(Romania) Alin Nicola	Decision (unanimous)	3	3:00
Openweight	(Romania) Andrei Vesa	def.	(Romania) Alexandru Gorczyca	Decision (split)	3	3:00
Bantamweight	(Romania) Robert Pavel	def.	(Romania) Cosmin Neagu	Decision (unanimous)	3	3:00
Women's Strawweight	(Romania) Andra Dura	def.	(Romania) Cristina Răduț	TKO (doctor stoppage/injury)	2	1:37
Women's Flyweight	(Romania) Liliana Amariței	def.	(Romania) Ágnes Sacas	Decision	3	2:00

== Colosseum Tournament 31 ==
Colosseum Tournament 31
- Promotion: Colosseum Tournament
- Date: May 9, 2022
- Venue: Victoria Arena
- City: Arad, Romania
- Attendance: 1,200

Event chronology
Fight Zone 8: Gladiator Night	Colosseum Tournament 31	Cezar WC 1

Colosseum Tournament 31 (also known as Dey Grand Prix) was a kickboxing event produced by the Colosseum Tournament that took place on May 9, 2022, at the Victoria Arena in Arad, Romania.

=== Background ===
A non-title welterweight bout between two-division Colosseum Tournament world champion Eduard Gafencu and Robert Gontineac headlined the event.

A Colosseum Tournament World Welterweight Championship title eliminator between former welterweight title challenger Anghel Cardoş and Alexandru Amariței took place as the co-main event.

A lightweight bout between former ISKA World Middleweight Champion Gabriel Bozan and Cosmin-Mădălin Grosu took place at this event.

=== Results ===
Main card (FightBox)
Weight class				Method	Round	Time	Notes
Welterweight	(Romania) Eduard Gafencu	def.	(Romania) Robert Gontineac	TKO (towel thrown/liver shot)	2	1:24
Welterweight	(Romania) Alexandru Amariței	def.	(Romania) Anghel Cardoş	Decision (unanimous)	3	3:00	(Note: Colosseum Tournament World Welterweight Championship Eliminator.)
Heavyweight	(Romania) Ilie Brancu	def.	(Romania) Sebatian Lutaniuc	Decision (unanimous)	3	3:00
Lightweight	(Romania) Gabriel Bozan	def.	(Romania) Cosmin-Mădălin Grosu	TKO (towel thrown)	3	0:01
Lightweight	(Romania) Darius Argyo	def.	(Romania) Constantin Holdur	Decision (majority)	3	3:00
Bantamweight	(Romania) Ruben Onișor	def.	(Romania) Adin Panaite	KO (right hook)	3	1:45
Featherweight	(Romania) Valentin Mavrodin	def.	(Romania) Alexandru Popescu	TKO (three knockdowns)	2	1:35
Bantamweight	(Romania) Claudiu Brilă	def.	(Romania) Ştefan Druja	Ext. R Decision (split)	4	3:00

== Cezar WC 1 ==
Cezar WC 1
- Promotion: Cezar Fight Championship
- Date: May 14, 2022
- Venue: CENT Hall
- City: Baia Mare, Romania

Event chronology
Colosseum Tournament 31	Cezar WC 1	Colosseum Tournament 32

Cezar Women's Championship 1 was a women's kickboxing event produced by the Cezar Fight Championship that took place on May 14, 2022, at the CENT Hall in Baia Mare, Romania.

=== Results ===
Main card (YouTube)
Weight class				Method	Round	Time	Notes
	(Italy) Maylah Ceraolo	def.	(Romania) Florina Cosma	Decision	3	2:00	(Note: For the international championship.)
	(Romania) Andreea Guțu	def.	(Romania) Laura Năstase	Decision (unanimous)	3	2:00	(Note: For the national championship.)
	(Romania) Daniela Lăpuşan	def.	(Romania) Patricia Dobreanu	Decision	3	2:00	(Note: For the national championship.)
	(Italy) Alice Moro	def.	(Romania) Lisa Décsey-Werner	Extra round decision	4	2:00	(Note: For the international championship.)
	(Romania) Denisa Nicorici	def.	(Romania) Carina Lucaci	TKO (towel thrown)	2	1:47
	(Romania) Natalia Roman	def.	(Romania) Patricia Pop	Decision (split)	3	2:00
	(Romania) Yasmina Grădinaru	def.	(Romania) Daria Băncilă	Decision	3	2:00
	(Romania) Patricia Polac	def.	(Romania) Nina Păvălean	Decision	3	2:00
	(Romania) Andreea Păduraru	def.	(Romania) Alina Pop	Extra round decision	4	2:00

== Colosseum Tournament 32 ==
Colosseum Tournament 32
- Promotion: Colosseum Tournament
- Date: June 3, 2022
- Venue: Craiova Arena
- City: Craiova, Romania
- Attendance: 1,900

Event chronology
Cezar WC 1	Colosseum Tournament 32	KO Masters 10

Colosseum Tournament 32: Amariței vs. Ćulafić was a kickboxing event produced by the Colosseum Tournament that took place on June 3, 2022, at the Craiova Arena in Craiova, Romania.

=== Background ===
A Colosseum Tournament World Middleweight Championship bout for the vacant title between Vasile Amariței and Mihajlo Ćulafić headlined the event.

=== Results ===
Main card (FightBox)
Weight class				Method	Round	Time	Notes
Middleweight	(Romania) Vasile Amariței	def.	(Montenegro) Mihajlo Ćulafić	Decision (unanimous)	5	3:00	(Note: For the vacant Colosseum Tournament World Middleweight Championship.)
Featherweight	(Romania) Adrian Maxim	def.	(Moldova) Ghenadie Gîtlan	Decision (unanimous)	3	3:00
Welterweight	(Romania) Mario Boboc	def.	(Romania) Octavian Jurj	TKO (corner stoppage)	2	1:34
Bantamweight	(Romania) Daniel Dragomir	def.	(Romania) Mihai Rusu	KO (liver shot)	3	0:38
Welterweight	(Romania) Alexandru Amariței	def.	(Romania) Liviu Ionilă	TKO (doctor stoppage)	2	2:27
Super Middleweight	(Romania) Alin Nicola	def.	(Romania) Adrian Daragiu	KO (punches)	2	0:53
Lightweight	(Romania) Lucian Gherman	def.	(Romania) Stevenson Lăcuste	Decision (majority)	3	3:00
Super Welterweight	(Romania) Alexandru Bogoș	def.	(Romania) Raul Sîrb	Decision (majority)	3	3:00
Women's Flyweight	(Romania) Cristina Răduț	def.	(Romania) Andra Dura	Decision (unanimous)	3	3:00
Featherweight	(Romania) Eric Orăşanu	def.	(Romania) Victor Alexandru	TKO (retirement)	1	2:57

== KO Masters 10 ==
KO Masters 10
- Promotion: KO Masters
- Date: June 20, 2022
- Venue: Berăria H
- City: Bucharest, Romania

Event chronology
Colosseum Tournament 32	KO Masters 10	Colosseum Tournament 33

KO Masters 10 was a kickboxing event produced by the KO Masters that took place on June 20, 2022 at the Berăria H in Bucharest, Romania.

=== Background ===
A heavyweight bout between Cristian Ristea and Kaan Murat İnanır headlined the event.

=== Results ===
Main card (Sport Extra Player)
Weight class				Method	Round	Time	Notes
Heavyweight	(Romania) Cristian Ristea	def.	(Turkey) Kaan Murat İnanır	TKO (towel thrown/liver punch)	1	0:44
Women's Bantamweight	(Romania) Andreea Cebuc	def.	(Romania) Ana Maria Pal	TKO (referee stoppage)	2	2:46
Openweight	(Romania) Nicu Buceac	def.	(Romania) Eugen Mailat	TKO (referee stoppage/low kick)	1	1:23
Featherweight	(Moldova) Dmitrii Sîrbu	def.	(Romania) Andrei Sîrghi	Decision (unanimous)	3	3:00
Heavyweight	(Romania) Vlăduț Ungureanu	def.	(Romania) Daniel Neag	Decision (unanimous)	3	3:00
Featherweight	(Romania) Ionel Bălan	def.	(Romania) Marko Dușinschi	Decision (split)	3	3:00
Openweight	(Romania) Adrian Gagiu	def.	(Romania) Andrei Ursu	KO (front kick and punch)	1	1:14
Middleweight	(Romania) Alin Nechită	def.	(Romania) Ionuț Busuioc	Decision (split)	3	3:00
Featherweight	(Romania) Daniel Mihai	def.	(Romania) Darius Cătănescu	KO (front kick and punches)	1	0:40

== Colosseum Tournament 33 ==
Colosseum Tournament 33
- Promotion: Colosseum Tournament
- Date: June 23, 2022
- Venue: Bucharest Arena
- City: Bucharest, Romania
- Attendance: 3,200

Event chronology
KO Masters 10	Colosseum Tournament 33	Dynamite Fighting Show 15

Colosseum Tournament 33: Căliniuc vs. Bilalovski was a kickboxing event produced by the Colosseum Tournament that took place on June 23, 2022, at the Bucharest Arena in Bucharest, Romania.

=== Background ===
A Colosseum Tournament World Lightweight Championship bout between current champion Sorin Căliniuc (also the Colosseum Tournament World Super Lightweight Champion) and former Wu Lin Feng World Championship Champion Nafi Bilalovski served as the main event.

A lightweight bout between former KOK World Lightweight Champion Vitalie Matei and Darius Argyo co-headlined the event.

A welterweight bout between multiple world kempo champion Mirel Drăgan and Alin Răducu took place at the event.

A non-title bantamweight bout between current Colosseum Tournament World Bantamweight Champion Iulian Marinescu and Shady Plez took place at this event.

=== Results ===
Main card (FightBox)
Weight class				Method	Round	Time	Notes
Lightweight	(Romania) Sorin Căliniuc (c)	def.	(Belgium) Nafi Bilalovski	Decision (unanimous)	5	3:00	(Note: For the Colosseum Tournament World Lightweight Championship.)
Lightweight	(Romania) Darius Argyo	def.	(Moldova) Vitalie Matei	Ext. R Decision (unanimous)	4	3:00
Welterweight	(Romania) Mirel Drăgan	def.	(Romania) Alin Răducu	Decision (unanimous)	3	3:00
Heavyweight	(Romania) Robert Damian	def.	(Romania) Ștefan Ciobanu	KO (low kick)	1	1:57
Bantamweight	(Romania) Iulian Marinescu	def.	(Italy) Shady Plez	TKO (referee stoppage)	2	1:45
Heavyweight	(Romania) Florin Matei	def.	(Romania) George Dinache	KO (punches and knees)	1	2:13
Bantamweight	(Romania) Daniel Handrea	def.	(China) Robert Hu Hua Long	Decision (unanimous)	3	3:00
Light Middleweight	(Romania) David Anton	def.	(Romania) Serkan Çelebi	Ext. R Decision (split)	4	3:00
Women's Flyweight	(Romania) Liliana Amariței	def.	(Romania) Monica Bălăşoiu	Ext. R Decision (unanimous)	4	3:00
Women's Flyweight	(Romania) Andreea Ursache	def.	(Romania) Jasmina Ciocoiu	Decision (majority)	3	3:00

== Dynamite Fighting Show 15 ==
Dynamite Fighting Show 15
- Promotion: Dynamite Fighting Show
- Date: June 24, 2022
- Venue: Romeo Iamandi Arena
- City: Buzău, Romania
- Attendance: 2,600

Event chronology
Colosseum Tournament 33	Dynamite Fighting Show 15	Confruntarea Titanilor 24

Dynamite Fighting Show 15: Stoica vs. Tevette was a kickboxing event produced by the Dynamite Fighting Show that took place on June 24, 2022, at the Romeo Iamandi Arena in Buzău, Romania.

=== Background ===
A heavyweight bout between former SUPERKOMBAT and Enfusion world champion Bogdan Stoica and Sam Tevette headlined the event.

A heavyweight bout between former DFS Heavyweight Champion Sebastian Cozmâncă and kickboxing star Freddy Kemayo co-headlined the event.

=== Results ===
Main card (Sport Extra Player)
Weight class				Method	Round	Time	Notes
Heavyweight	(Romania) Bogdan Stoica	def.	(Netherlands) Sam Tevette	Decision (unanimous)	3	3:00
Heavyweight	(Romania) Sebastian Cozmâncă	def.	(France) Freddy Kemayo	Decision (unanimous)	3	3:00
Welterweight	(Romania) Florin Lambagiu	def.	(Turkey) Burak Ünal	KO (liver shot)	2	3:00
Welterweight	(Romania) Andrei Ostrovanu	def.	(Belgium) Frank Rubanguka	Decision (unanimous)	3	3:00
Middleweight	(Romania) Bogdan Năstase	def.	(Turkey) Salih Akman	TKO (three knockdowns)	2	1:21
Welterweight	(Romania) Andrei Leuştean	def.	(Romania) Cezar Buzdugan	Decision (unanimous)	3	3:00
Super Welterweight	(Romania) Mădălin Mogoş	def.	(Romania) Andrei Andreescu	Ext. R Decision (unanimous)	4	3:00
Lightweight	(Romania) Ionuț Popa	def.	(Romania) Neculai Bosnea	TKO (referee stoppage)	3	2:34

== Confruntarea Titanilor 24 ==
Confruntarea Titanilor 24
- Promotion: Respect Gym Găești
- Date: July 22, 2022
- Venue: Târgoviște Arena
- City: Târgoviște, Romania
- Attendance: 1,600

Event chronology
Dynamite Fighting Show 15	Confruntarea Titanilor 24	UFT 10

Confruntarea Titanilor 24 (also known as Clash of the Titans 24) was a kickboxing and mixed martial arts event produced by the Respect Gym Găești that took place on July 22, 2022, at the Târgoviște Arena in Târgoviște, Romania.

=== Background ===
A heavyweight bout between Cristian Ristea and Olivier Langlois-Ross was expected to headline the event. However, Olivier Langlois-Ross was forced out of the fight due to an injury and was replaced by Florin Ivănoaie.

A super lightweight bout between Călin Petrișor and SB Gym's Čedo Pantić co-headlined the event.

=== Results ===
Main card (Pro Arena)
Weight class				Method	Round	Time	Notes
Heavyweight	(Romania) Florin Ivănoaie	def.	(Romania) Cristian Ristea	TKO (towel thrown)	4	1:51
Super Lightweight	(Romania) Călin Petrișor	def.	(Bosnia and Herzegovina) Čedo Pantić	Decision (split)	3	3:00
Middleweight	(Romania) Costin Dinu	def.	(Romania) Adrian Vodă	KO (low kicks)	2	0:29
Middleweight	(Romania) Ionuț Busuioc	def.	(Moldova) Cătălin Anton	Decision (unanimous)	3	3:00
Bantamweight	(Romania) Marian Lupașcu	def.	(Romania) Daniel Dragomir	Decision (unanimous)	3	3:00
Middleweight	(Romania) Andrei Bujor	def.	(Romania) Emilian Sîngeorzan	Decision (unanimous)	3	3:00
Lightweight	(Moldova) Vitalie Panainte	def.	(Romania) David Constantin	Decision (unanimous)	3	3:00
Welterweight	(Romania) Ionuț Mădălin Maxim	def.	(Romania) Daniel Moldoveanu	Decision (unanimous)	3	3:00

== UFT 10 ==
UFT 10
- Promotion: Ultimate Fighting Tournament
- Date: August 12, 2022
- Venue: Satu Mare Arena
- City: Satu Mare, Romania

Event chronology
Confruntarea Titanilor 24	UFT 10	Colosseum Tournament 34

UFT 10 was a kickboxing and mixed martial arts event produced by the Ultimate Fighting Tournament that took place on August 12, 2022, at the Satu Mare Arena in Satu Mare, Romania.

=== Background ===
A UFT Heavyweight Championship bout for the vacant title between former Colosseum Tournament Heavyweight Champion Marius Munteanu and DFS 8 finalist Sebastian Lutaniuc headlined the event.

=== Results ===
Main card (Sport Extra Player)
Weight class				Method	Round	Time	Notes
Heavyweight	(Romania) Sebastian Lutaniuc	def.	(Romania) Marius Munteanu	Decision (unanimous)	5	3:00	(Note: For the vacant UFT Heavyweight Championship.)
Welterweight	(Romania) David Anton	def.	(Romania) Bogdan Slabu	Decision (unanimous)	3	3:00	(Note: Welterweight Tournament Final. For the vacant UFT Welterweight Championship.)
Light Welterweight	(Romania) Andrei Varga	def.	(Romania) Claudiu Bucur	KO (spinning back fist)	3	1:05	(Note: For the vacant UFT Light Welterweight Championship.)
Lightweight	(Romania) Costel Șchiopu	def.	(Romania) Florin Orzac	TKO (retirement)	2	0:58
Welterweight	(Romania) Bogdan Slabu	def.	(Romania) Luca Chermeș	Decision (unanimous)	3	3:00	(Note: Welterweight UFT Championship Tournament Semifinal.)
Welterweight	(Romania) David Anton	def.	(Romania) Zsolt Balint	TKO (referee stoppage)	2	2:01	(Note: Welterweight UFT Championship Tournament Semifinal.)
Lightweight	(Romania) Emanuel Lupașcu	def.	(Romania) Cătălin Makove	Decision (unanimous)	3	3:00

== Colosseum Tournament 34 ==
Colosseum Tournament 34
- Promotion: Colosseum Tournament
- Date: August 18, 2022
- Venue: Dumitru Popescu-Colibași Arena
- City: Brașov, Romania
- Attendance: 1,400

Event chronology
UFT 10	Colosseum Tournament 34	Prometheus 3

Colosseum Tournament 34: Gafencu vs. Amariței was a kickboxing event produced by the Colosseum Tournament that took place on August 18, 2022, at the Dumitru Popescu-Colibași Arena in Brașov, Romania.

Five percent of event ticket revenue were donated to Brașov Children's Hospital.

Nick Negumereanu made special guest appearance at the event.

=== Background ===
A Colosseum Tournament World Welterweight Championship bout between current champion Eduard Gafencu (also Colosseum Tournament World Super Welterweight Champion) and Alexandru Amariței headlined the event.

The event featured a 4-Man Welterweight Contender Tournament to earn a title shot.

=== Results ===
Main card (FightBox)
Weight class				Method	Round	Time	Notes
Welterweight	(Romania) Alexandru Amariței	def.	(Romania) Eduard Gafencu (c)	Decision (unanimous)	5	3:00	(Note: For the Colosseum Tournament World Welterweight Championship.)
Welterweight	(Romania) Ștefan Orza	def.	(Romania) Mădălin Crăciunică	Decision (unanimous)	3	3:00	(Note: Welterweight Contender Tournament Final. Colosseum Tournament World Welterweight Championship Eliminator.)
Featherweight	(Romania) Valentin Mavrodin	def.	(Romania) Bogdan Floriștean	Decision (unanimous)	3	3:00	(Note: Featherweight Tournament Final. For the inaugural Colosseum Tournament New Heroes Featherweight Championship.)
Bantamweight	(Romania) Edmond Mustafa	def.	(Romania) Cosmin Prelipcianu	TKO (referee stoppage)	3	1:16
Featherweight	(Romania) Dan Popa	def.	(Romania) Ionuț Cișmaru	Decision (unanimous)	3	3:00
Featherweight	(Romania) Bogdan Floriștean	def.	(Romania) Paul Cornea	Decision (unanimous)	3	3:00	(Note: Featherweight New Heroes Championship Tournament Semifinal.)
Featherweight	(Romania) Valentin Mavrodin	def.	(Romania) Alexandru Popescu	Decision (majority)	3	3:00	(Note: Featherweight New Heroes Championship Tournament Semifinal.)
Welterweight	(Romania) Mădălin Crăciunică	def.	(Romania) Andrei Verde	KO (high kicks and punches)	1	3:00	(Note: Welterweight Contender Tournament Semifinal.)
Welterweight	(Romania) Ștefan Orza	def.	(Romania) Anghel Cardoş	Decision (unanimous)	3	3:00	(Note: Welterweight Contender Tournament Semifinal.)

== Prometheus 3 ==
Prometheus 3
- Promotion: Prometheus Fighting Promotion
- Date: September 1, 2022
- Venue: Dej Arena
- City: Dej, Romania

Event chronology
Colosseum Tournament 34	Prometheus 3	Best of the Best 1

Prometheus 3: Maxim vs. Filipov was a kickboxing and boxing event produced by the Prometheus Fighting Promotion that took place on September 1, 2022, at the Dej Arena in Dej, Romania.

=== Background ===
The event was headlined by a featherweight bout between former DFS Lightweight Champion Adrian Maxim and Vladimir Filipov.

=== Results ===
Main card (FightBox)
Weight class				Method	Round	Time	Notes
Featherweight	(Romania) Adrian Maxim	def.	(Moldova) Vladimir Filipov	KO (left hook to the body)	1	1:01
Heavyweight	(Moldova) Iaroslav Linnic	def.	(Romania) Florin Matei	Ext. R Decision (unanimous)	4	3:00	(Note: Prometheus 3 Heavyweight Tournament Final.)
Middleweight	(Romania) Cristian Suli	def.	(Romania) Alexandru Stan	Ext. R Decision (unanimous)	4	3:00
Bantamweight	(Romania) Paul Tolaș	def.	(Romania) Bogdan Plotuna	Decision (unanimous)	3	3:00
Welterweight	(Romania) Alin Răducu	def.	(Romania) Paul Cucerzan	TKO (referee stoppage)	2	2:02
Lightweight	(Moldova) Marius Timofti	def.	(Romania) Florin Orzac	Decision (unanimous)	3	3:00
Heavyweight	(Romania) Florin Matei	def.	(Romania) Ovidiu Hațegan	Decision (unanimous)	3	3:00	(Note: Prometheus 3 Heavyweight Tournament Semifinal.)
Heavyweight	(Moldova) Iaroslav Linnic	def.	(Romania) Ilie Brâncu	TKO (three knockdowns)	1	2:57	(Note: Prometheus 3 Heavyweight Tournament Semifinal.)

== Best of the Best 1 ==
Best of the Best 1
- Promotion: Festivalul Artelor Marțiale
- Date: September 10, 2022
- Venue: Danubius Arena
- City: Brăila, Romania

Event chronology
Prometheus 3	Best of the Best 1	Colosseum Tournament 35

Best of the Best 1: Paraschiv vs. Sánchez was a kickboxing, mixed martial arts, grappling BJJ and boxing event produced by the Festivalul Artelor Marțiale that took place on September 10, 2022, at the Danubius Arena in Brăila, Romania.

=== Background ===
A SUPERKOMBAT World Middleweight Championship bout between current champion Amansio Paraschiv and ISKA World Light Middleweight Champion Sergio "Dinamita" Sánchez headlined the event.

A GFC Intercontinental Heavyweight Championship bout for the vacant title between former DFS Heavyweight Champion Ionuț Iancu and Cristian Ristea co-headlined the event.

=== Results ===
Main card (Prima Sport)
Weight class				Method	Round	Time	Notes
Lightweight	(Romania) Amansio Paraschiv (c)	def.	(Spain) Sergio Sánchez	Decision (split)	5	3:00	(Note: For the SUPERKOMBAT World Middleweight Championship.)
Heavyweight	(Romania) Cristian Ristea	def.	(Romania) Ionuț Iancu	Decision (split)	5	3:00	(Note: For the vacant GFC Intercontinental Heavyweight Championship.)
Heavyweight	(Romania) Marius Munteanu	def.	(Romania) Andrei Petrarașu	Decision (unanimous)	3	3:00
Middleweight	(Romania) Ionuț Busuioc	def.	(Romania) Marius Rotaru	Decision (unanimous)	3	3:00
Featherweight	(Romania) Valentin Mavrodin	def.	(Romania) Marko Dușinschi	KO (head kick)	1	2:12
Light Featherweight	(Romania) Enzo Mincă	def.	(Romania) Cristinel Vișoină (c)	Decision (unanimous)	3	3:00	(Note: For the WKU Amateur Romania Light Featherweight Championship.)
Preliminary Card
Welterweight	(Romania) Leonard Florea	def.	(Romania) Mihai Isuf	Decision (unanimous)	3	2:00

== Colosseum Tournament 35 ==
Colosseum Tournament 35
- Promotion: Colosseum Tournament
- Date: September 30, 2022
- Venue: Târgoviște Arena
- City: Târgoviște, Romania

Event chronology
Best of the Best 1	Colosseum Tournament 35	DFS 16

Colosseum Tournament 35: Căliniuc vs. Requejo was a kickboxing event produced by the Colosseum Tournament that took place on September 30, 2022, at the Târgoviște Arena in Târgoviște, Romania.

=== Background ===
A Colosseum Tournament World Lightweight Championship bout between current champion Sorin Căliniuc (also the Colosseum Tournament World Super Lightweight Champion) and current WKN World Super Welterweight Champion Jordi Requejo headlined the event.

A Colosseum Tournament World Bantamweight Championship bout between the current champion Iulian Marinescu and Anatolii Gafin was originally expected to take place as the co-main event. However, Gafin withdrew for unknown reasons. He was replaced by Ovidiu Popadiuc.

A featherweight bout between former ISKA World Middleweight Champion Gabriel Bozan and Anass Ahmidouch was scheduled for the event. However, Ahmidouch was pulled from the event for an undisclosed reason and replaced by Eduard del Prado.

A lightweight bout between Darius Argyo and Robert Guraliuc took place at this event.

A welterweight bout between multiple world kempo champion Mirel Drăgan and Alin Vînătoru took place at the event.

Daniel Dragomir faced Edmond Mustafa in a bantamweight bout.

=== Results ===
Main card (FightBox)
Weight class				Method	Round	Time	Notes
Lightweight	(Romania) Sorin Căliniuc (c)	def.	(Spain) Jordi Requejo	Decision (unanimous)	5	3:00	(Note: For the Colosseum Tournament World Lightweight Championship.)
Bantamweight	(Romania) Ovidiu Popadiuc	def.	(Romania) Iulian Marinescu (c)	Decision (split)	5	3:00	(Note: For the Colosseum Tournament World Bantamweight Championship.)
Featherweight	(Spain) Eduard del Prado	def.	(Romania) Gabriel Bozan	Ext. R Decision (unanimous)	4	3:00
Lightweight	(Romania) Darius Argyo	def.	(Romania) Robert Guraliuc	Decision (unanimous)	3	3:00
Middleweight	(Moldova) Maxim Zaplîtni	def.	(Romania) Ionuț Busuioc	Ext. R Decision (split)	4	3:00
Welterweight	(Romania) Mirel Drăgan	def.	(Romania) Alin Vînătoru	Decision (unanimous)	3	3:00
Featherweight	(Romania) Daniel Dragomir	def.	(Romania) Edmond Mustafa	KO (jumping knee)	3	2:58
Bantamweight	(Romania) Daniel Handrea	def.	(Romania) Cosmin Brumă	Decision (unanimous)	3	3:00
Lightweight	(Romania) Denis Ceaușu	def.	(Romania) Ionuț Cismaru	Decision (unanimous)	3	3:00
Middleweight	(Romania) Marko Vizitiu	def.	(Romania) Mario Chivulescu	TKO (referee stoppage)	3	1:14

== Dynamite Fighting Show 16 ==
Dynamite Fighting Show 16
- Promotion: Dynamite Fighting Show
- Date: October 19, 2022
- Venue: Iași Arena
- City: Iași, Romania

Event chronology
Colosseum Tournament 35	Dynamite Fighting Show 16	Colosseum Tournament 36

Dynamite Fighting Show 16: Lambagiu vs. Camara (also known as Heavyweight Invasion) was a kickboxing event produced by the Dynamite Fighting Show that took place on October 19, 2022 at the Iași Arena in Iași, Romania.

=== Background ===
A welterweight bout between former Colosseum Tournament World Light Welterweight Champion Florin Lambagiu and former IKKC World Middleweight Muaythai Champion Diaguely Camara headlined the event.

A heavyweight bout between former DFS Heavyweight Champion Sebastian Cozmâncă (also the former Colosseum Tournament World Light Heavyweight Champion) and former ISKA World Cruiserweight Champion also co-headlined the event.

=== Results ===
Main card (Sport Extra Player)
Weight class				Method	Round	Time	Notes
Welterweight	(France) Diaguely Camara	def.	(Romania) Florin Lambagiu	Decision (unanimous)	3	3:00
Heavyweight	(Romania) Sebastian Cozmâncă	def.	(Portugal) Bruno Susano	Decision (unanimous)	3	3:00
Heavyweight	(Romania) Cristian Ristea	def.	(Italy) Florin Matei	Decision (unanimous)	3	3:00
Junior Middleweight	(Romania) Bogdan Năstase	def.	(Turkey) Burak Ünal	Decision (unanimous)	3	3:00
Heavyweight	(Romania) Marius Munteanu	def.	(Romania) Valentin Bordianu	KO (punches)	1	2:32
Heavyweight	(Romania) Ștefan Lătescu	def.	(Netherlands) Sam Tevette	KO (punches)	1	2:51
Heavyweight	(Romania) Ilie Brâncu	def.	(Romania) Sebastian Lutaniuc	Ext. R Decision (unanimous)	4	3:00
Heavyweight	(Romania) Florin Ivănoaie	def.	(Romania) Yanis Ciulin	KO (punch)	1	2:06

== Colosseum Tournament 36 ==
Colosseum Tournament 36
- Promotion: Colosseum Tournament
- Date: October 21, 2022
- Venue: Elisabeta Lipă Arena
- City: Botoșani, Romania

Event chronology
DFS16	Colosseum Tournament 36	Urban Legend 13

Colosseum Tournament 35: Amariței vs. Orza was a kickboxing event produced by the Colosseum Tournament that took place on October 21, 2022, at the Elisabeta Lipă Arena in Botoșani, Romania.

=== Background ===
A Colosseum Tournament World Welterweight Championship bout between current champion Alexandru Amariței and Ștefan Orza headlined the event.

=== Results ===
Main card (FightBox)
Weight class				Method	Round	Time	Notes
Welterweight	(Romania) Ștefan Orza	def.	(Romania) Alexandru Amariței (c)	Decision (unanimous)	5	3:00	(Note: For the Colosseum Tournament World Welterweight Championship.)
Featherweight	(Romania) Andrei Sîrghi	def.	(Romania) Bogdan Floriștean	Decision (majority)	3	3:00
Bantamweight	(Romania) Mihai Rusu	def.	(Romania) Ştefan Druja	Decision (unanimous)	3	3:00
Lightweight	(Romania) Leonard Morariu	def.	(Romania) Neculai Bosnea	Decision (split)	3	3:00
Women's Flyweight	(Romania) Liliana Amariței	def.	(Romania) Ana Maria Pal	Decision (split)	3	3:00
Welterweight	(Romania) Liviu Ionilă	def.	(Romania) David Anton	Ext. R Decision (unanimous)	4	3:00

== Urban Legend 13 ==
Urban Legend 13
- Promotion: Urban Legend
- Date: November 11, 2022
- Venue: La Scoica Land
- City: Mamaia, Romania

Event chronology
Colosseum Tournament 36	Urban Legend 13	Colosseum Tournament 37

Urban Legend 13: Next Star was a kickboxing and boxing event produced by the Urban Legend that took place on November 11, 2022 at the La Scoica Land in Mamaia, Romania.

Ștefan Orza, Alex Filip and Mădălin Pîrvulescu made special guest appearances at the event.

=== Results ===
Main card (Dotto TV)
Weight class				Method	Round	Time	Notes
Welterweight	(Romania) Marian-Florin Soare	def.	(Romania) Marius Cimpoieru	KO (punches and high kick)	3	0:50
Heavyweight	(Romania) Ștefan Panaitescu	def.	(Romania) Cosmin Bucoveanu	Decision	3	3:00
Lightweight	(Romania) Mădălin Gheorghe	def.	(Romania) Ciprian Mureșan	TKO (corner stoppage)	3	1:38
Light Welterweight	(Romania) Daniel Moldoveanu	def.	(Romania) Ovidiu Jaluba	Decision	3	3:00
Bantamweight	(Romania) Daniel Handrea	def.	(Romania) Cosmin Brumă	TKO (corner stoppage)	3	0:20
Bantamweight	(China) Robert Hu Hua Long	def.	(Romania) Paul Pantă	Decision	3	3:00

== Colosseum Tournament 37 ==
Colosseum Tournament 37
- Promotion: Colosseum Tournament
- Date: November 21, 2022
- Venue: Romeo Iamandi Arena
- City: Buzău, Romania

Event chronology
Urban Legend 13	Colosseum Tournament 37	Dynasty Fight Night

Colosseum Tournament 37: Mavrodin vs. Dragomir was a kickboxing event produced by the Colosseum Tournament that took place on November 21, 2022, at the Romeo Iamandi Arena in Buzău, Romania.

=== Results ===
Main card (FightBox)
Weight class				Method	Round	Time	Notes
Featherweight	(Romania) Valentin Mavrodin (c)	def.	(Romania) Daniel Dragomir	Decision (unanimous)	5	3:00	(Note: For the Colosseum Tournament New Heroes Featherweight Championship. Originally ruled a Split Decision victory for Dragomir, result overturned after fight was rescored.)
Featherweight	(Romania) Ionuț Popa	def.	(Moldova) Maxim Răilean	Decision (unanimous)	3	3:00
Welterweight	(Romania) Mădălin Crăciunică	def.	(Romania) Liviu Ionilă	Decision (unanimous)	3	3:00
Lightweight	(Romania) Marian Lăpușneanu	def.	(Romania) Darius Argyo	Ext. R Decision (split)	4	3:00
Welterweight	(Romania) Mario Boboc	def.	(Romania) Ionuț Mădălin Maxim	Decision (unanimous)	3	3:00
Featherweight	(Romania) Alexandru Popescu	def.	(Romania) Gabriel Cobzaru	Decision (unanimous)	3	3:00
Lightweight	(Romania) Lucian Gherman	def.	(Romania) Denis Ceaușu	Decision (majority)	3	3:00
Bantamweight	(Romania) Mihai Rusu	def.	(Romania) Daniel Handrea	Decision (majority)	3	3:00

== Dynasty Fight Night ==
Dynasty Fight Night
- Promotion: Dynasty Fight League
- Date: November 25, 2022
- Venue: Apollo Sports Center
- City: Bucharest, Romania

Event chronology
Colosseum Tournament 37	Dynasty Fight Night	GWS 1

Dynasty Fight Night: The Return of "The Bomber" Alexandru Niță was a boxing, kickboxing and stick-fighting event produced by the Dynasty Fight League that took place on November 25, 2022, at the Apollo Sports Center in Bucharest, Romania.

Gago Drago made special guest appearances at the event.

=== Results ===
Main card (Sport Extra TV)
Weight class				Method	Round	Time	Notes
Middleweight	(Romania) Ionuț Busuioc	def.	(Romania) Alin Vînătoru	Decision	3	2:00
Super Middleweight	(Romania) Marian Bratu	def.	(Romania) Laurențiu Petcu	Decision	3	2:00
Lightweight	(Romania) Ovidiu Mereț	vs.	(Romania) Alexandru Sinița	Draw	3	2:00	(Note: Originally ruled a decision victory for Mereț, result overturned due to a mistake on the scorecards.)
Light Middleweight	(Romania) Mario Chivulescu	def.	(Romania) Marco Catrin	Decision	3	2:00
Super Featherweight	(Romania) Antonio Iordache	def.	(Romania) Ionuț Ceaușu	Decision	3	2:00
Women's Flyweight	(Romania) Cătălina Stancu	def.	(Romania) Melania Ștefan	Decision	3	2:00
Light Welterweight	(Romania) Marian Solomon	def.	(Romania) Laurențiu Crăciun	Decision	3	2:00

== GWS 1 ==
GWS 1
- Promotion: Gladius World Series
- Date: November 26, 2022
- Venue: Sandro Pertini Sports Center
- City: Milan, Italy

Event chronology
Dynasty Fight Night	GWS 1	Fight Zone 9

GWS 1: Amariței vs. Rigamonti was a kickboxing event produced by the Gladius World Series that took place on November 26, 2022, at the Sandro Pertini Sports Center in Milan, Italy.

=== Results ===
Main card (FITE)
Weight class				Method	Round	Time	Notes
Middleweight	(Italy) Massimo Rigamonti	def.	(Romania) Vasile Amariței	Decision (unanimous)	3	3:00	(Note: For the inaugural GWS World Middleweight Championship.)
Lightweight	(Italy) Michele Mazzola	def.	(Italy) Mario Argento	Decision (majority)	3	3:00	(Note: Lightweight Tournament Final.)
Heavyweight	(Italy) Umberto Lucci	def.	(Moldova) Anatoli Ciumac	Decision (split)	3	3:00
Lightweight	(Tunisia) Nour Ben Ezzeddine	def.	(Senegal) Masseyni Diakhaté	KO (right hook)	1	1:50	(Note: For the WKAFL Europe Lightweight Championship.)
Bantamweight	(Morocco) Farid Tahiri	def.	(Italy) Fabio Zeccola	TKO (referee stoppage)	1	2:53
Light Middleweight	(Moldova) Costantin Dolghi	def.	(Italy) Edoardo Peretti	KO (right hook)	1	1:52
Women's Bantamweight	(Italy) Eleonora Parigi	def.	(Italy) Isabella Ratti	Decision (majority)	3	3:00
Lightweight	(Italy) Mario Argento	def.	(Italy) Laurențiu Partenie	Decision (unanimous)	3	3:00	(Note: Lightweight Tournament Semifinal.)
Lightweight	(Italy) Michele Mazzola	def.	(Egypt) Mahmoud Deyab	TKO (towel thrown)	2	0:34	(Note: Lightweight Tournament Semifinal.)

== Fight Zone 9 ==
Fight Zone 9
- Promotion: Fight Zone
- Date: December 4, 2022
- Venue: Deva Arena
- City: Deva, Romania

Event chronology
GWS 1	Fight Zone 9	DFS 17

Fight Zone 9: Lungu vs. Cubano (also known as Gladiators Night) was a kickboxing, mixed martial arts and boxing event produced by the Fight Zone that took place on December 4, 2022 at the Deva Arena in Deva, Romania.

=== Results ===
Main card (TomTix Player)
Weight class				Method	Round	Time	Notes
Super Featherweight	(Romania) Vlad Trif	def.	(Hungary) László Balogh	TKO (towel thrown/punches)	1	1:03
Light Heavyweight	(Romania) Fery Alionte	def.	(Hungary) Bálint Koszorús	TKO (referee stoppage)	1	2:32
Heavyweight	(Romania) Cristian-Gabriel Conea	def.	(Romania) Marius Munteanu	Decision (split)	3	3:00
Heavyweight	(Romania) Ion Grigore	def.	(Romania) Ștefan Panaitescu	Decision (unanimous)	3	3:00
Light Heavyweight	(Romania) Alin Nicola	vs.	(Romania) Daniel Micu	Draw	4	3:00
Heavyweight	(Romania) Andrei Vesa	def.	(Romania) Călin Bindiu	Decision (unanimous)	3	3:00

== Dynamite Fighting Show 17 ==
Dynamite Fighting Show 17
- Promotion: Dynamite Fighting Show; OSS Fighters
- Date: December 8, 2022
- Venue: Constanța Arena
- City: Constanța, Romania

Event chronology
Fight Zone 9	Dynamite Fighting Show 17	Urban Legend 14

Dynamite Fighting Show 17: Night of Champions (also known as OSS Fighters 08) was a kickboxing event produced by the Dynamite Fighting Show in association with OSS Fighters that took place on December 8, 2022 at the Constanța Arena in Constanța, Romania.

=== Results ===
Main card (Sport Extra Player)
Weight class				Method	Round	Time	Notes
Heavyweight	(Netherlands) Colin George	def.	(Romania) Sebastian Cozmâncă	Decision (unanimous)	3	3:00
Middleweight	(Romania) Alex Filip	def.	(Brazil) Rodrigo Mineiro	Decision (unanimous)	3	3:00
Welterweight	(Romania) Florin Lambagiu	def.	(France) Majid Amarouche	TKO (three knockdowns)	4	2:35
Heavyweight	(Germany) Vladimir Toktasynov	def.	(Romania) Florin Ivănoaie	TKO (referee stoppage)	1	1:03
Middleweight	(Romania) Bogdan Năstase	def.	(Greece) Marios Blanas	Decision (unanimous)	3	3:00
Lightweight	(Romania) Daniel Corbeanu	def.	(Bulgaria) Konstantin Stoykov	KO (overhand right)	2	2:25
Welterweight	(Romania) Andrei Leuştean	def.	(Romania) Mădălin Crăciunică	TKO (retirement)	1	1:54
Featherweight	(Romania) Călin Petrișor	def.	(Morocco) Said Malek	Decision (unanimous)	3	3:00

== Urban Legend 14 ==
Urban Legend 14
- Promotion: Urban Legend
- Date: December 27, 2022
- Venue: La Scoica Land
- City: Mamaia, Romania

Event chronology
DFS 17	Urban Legend 14	Road to DFS 1

Urban Legend 14: Fight For Andreea! was a kickboxing event produced by the Urban Legend that took place on December 27, 2022 at the La Scoica Land in Mamaia, Romania.

=== Results ===
Main card (PPV)
Weight class				Method	Round	Time	Notes
Light Welterweight	(Romania) Cristian Măniță	def.	(Romania) Răzvan Zlate	KO	1
Welterweight	(Romania) Marian-Florin Soare	def.	(Turkey) Şenol Septar	TKO	1
Bantamweight	(Romania) Vlăduț Oprică	vs.	(China) Robert Hu Hua Long	Draw	3
Lightweight	(Romania) Ionuț Chirchiboi	def.	(Romania) Nicu Ramadan	TKO	1
Heavyweight	(Romania) Laurențiu Gavril	def.	(Romania) Ștefan Panaitescu	Decision	3
Lightweight	(Romania) Mario Drăgoi	def.	(Turkey) Rasim Geaner	Decision	3
Lightweight	(Romania) Florin Memet	def.	(Romania) Ionuț Crivăț	KO	1
Bantamweight	(Romania) Cosmin Brumă	def.	(Romania) Andrei Tănăsescu	TKO	3
Light Featherweight	(Romania) Mihai Nica	def.	(Romania) Georgian Trifu	TKO	1
Featherweight	(Romania) Niki Hrițuleac	def.	(Romania) Eduard Smeu	Decision	3
Flyweight	(Romania) Eduardo Maradin	def.	(Romania) Mario Andrei	Decision	3

== See also ==
- 2022 in Glory
- 2022 in ONE Championship
- 2022 in K-1
- 2022 in RISE
- 2022 in Wu Lin Feng
