= 2018 in Romanian kickboxing =

The 2018 season was the 16th season of competitive kickboxing in Romania.

== List of events ==
#	Event Title	Date	Arena	Location
1	Fighters League 2	January 27, 2018	Sala Polivalentă	Reșița, Romania
2	Colosseum Tournament 5	February 23, 2018	Patinoarul Dunărea	Galați, Romania
3	SUPERKOMBAT Dream	March 25, 2018	Magic Place	Bucharest, Romania
4	Colosseum Tournament 6	April 20, 2018	Sala Polivalentă	Iaşi, Romania
5	OSS Fighters 01	April 20, 2018	Sala Sporturilor	Constanța, Romania
6	GFC 4: Bulgaria vs. Romania	April 28, 2018	Varna Palace	Varna, Bulgaria
7	Colosseum Tournament 7	May 24, 2018	Sala Polivalentă	Bucharest, Romania
8	Dynamite Fighting Show 1: Moroșanu vs. Kemayo	July 5, 2018	Sala Polivalentă	Bucharest, Romania
9	ACB KB 16	July 13, 2018	Unirii Plaza	Târgoviște, Romania
10	OSS Fighters 02/GFC 5: Romania vs. China	August 24, 2018	Piațeta Cazino	Mamaia, Romania
11	Colosseum Tournament 8	September 17, 2018	Sala Polivalentă	Bucharest, Romania
12	APP Fight Night 01	October 8, 2018	Hotel Lux Divina	Brașov, Romania
13	Dynamite Fighting Show 2	October 19, 2018	Sala Polivalentă	Piatra Neamț, Romania
14	Colosseum Tournament 9: Ghiță vs. Poturak	October 29, 2018	BTarena	Cluj-Napoca, Romania
15	SAS Gym 01	November 2, 2018	SAS Gym	Bucharest, Romania
16	Dynamite Fighting Show 3	December 14, 2018	Sala Polivalentă	Craiova, Romania
17	Colosseum Tournament 10	December 14, 2018	Sala Constantin Jude	Timișoara, Romania

== Fighters League 2 ==
Fighters League 2
- Promotion: Fighters League
- Date: January 27, 2018
- Venue: Sala Polivalentă
- City: Reșița, Romania
- Attendance: 2,000

Event chronology
2017 in Romanian kickboxing	Fighters League 2	Colosseum Tournament 5

Fighters League 2 was a kickboxing event produced by the Fighters League that took place on January 27, 2018, at the Sala Polivalentă in Reșița, Romania.

=== Results ===
Fighters League 2
Weight Class				Method	Round	Time	Notes
86 kg	(Romania) Sebastian Ciobanu	def.	(Italy) Ricardo Masso	Decision	3	3:00	
100+ kg	(Romania) Flavius Căldăraș	def.	(Italy) Giorgio Schiavina	KO (punches)	1	1:10	For the WKA European +100 kg Championship
70 kg	(Romania) Adrian Maxim	def.	(Italy) Samuele De Meis	Decision	3	3:00	
70 kg	(Romania) Haris Ferizovici	vs.	(Italy) Ivan Delvecchio	Draw	3	3:00	
71 kg	(Italy) Tiziano Campus	def.	(Romania) Rayko Levițchi	Decision (split)	3	3:00	
80 kg	(Romania) Eduard Gafencu	def.	(Romania) Paul Crețiu	Decision	3	3:00	
Women's 60 kg	(Romania) Maria Nedelcu	def.	(Romania) Camelia Bîrsan	Decision	3	3:00	
63 kg	(Romania) Cătălin Pantea	def.	(Romania) Beniamin Radu	KO (right high kick)	3	1:10	
95+ kg	(Romania) Cristian Simiuc	def.	(Romania) Adrian Didea	Decision	3	3:00	

== Colosseum Tournament 5 ==
Colosseum Tournament 5
- Promotion: Colosseum Tournament
- Date: February 23, 2018
- Venue: Patinoarul Dunărea
- City: Galați, Romania

Event chronology
Fighters League 2	Colosseum Tournament 5	SUPERKOMBAT Dream

Colosseum Tournament 5 was a kickboxing event produced by the Colosseum Tournament that took place on February 23, 2018, at the Patinoarul Dunărea in Galați, Romania.

=== Results ===
Colosseum Tournament 5 (FightBox)
Weight Class				Method	Round	Time	Notes
65 kg	(Moldova) Maxim Răilean	def.	(Romania) Ionuț Atodiresei	TKO (injury)	1	2:09	
Women's 65 kg	(Romania) Cristiana Stancu	def.	(Greece) Katerina Abdalla	TKO (towel thrown)	1	1:32	
95 kg	(Romania) Sebastian Cozmâncă	def.	(United States) Dustin Stoltzfus	KO (left hook)	1	1:26	
71 kg	(Romania) Amansio Paraschiv	def.	(Italy) Yuri Gentile	Decision (unanimous)	3	3:00	
91 kg	(Romania) Dănuț Hurduc	def.	(Italy) Davide Longoni	Decision (unanimous)	3	3:00	
91 kg	(Romania) Marinică Bejenaru	def.	(Romania) Viorel Butnaru	KO (knee to the body)	3	1:53	
72,5 kg	(Romania) Alin Pricopie	def.	(Moldova) Stanislav Striba	Decision (unanimous)	3	3:00	
81 kg	(Romania) Adrian Florea	def.	(Romania) Gabriel Ciulea	KO (right punch)	2	2:51	
77 kg	(Romania) Dan Petcu	vs.	(Romania) Lucian Casoni	No contest (accidental headbutt)	1	2:50	
86 kg	(Romania) Vlad Hurduc	def.	(Romania) Mădălin Mogoş	Decision (split)	4	3:00	
81 kg	(Moldova) Maxim Zaplîtni	vs.	(Romania) Costel Pașniciuc	No contest (accidental low blow)	2	0:22	
67 kg	(Romania) Marian Lăpușneanu	def.	(Romania) Vlad Trif	Decision (unanimous)	3	3:00	
70 kg	(Romania) Alexandru Voicu	def.	(Romania) Bogdan Nuț	Decision (unanimous)	3	3:00	

== SUPERKOMBAT Dream ==
SUPERKOMBAT Dream
- Promotion: Superkombat Fighting Championship
- Date: March 25, 2018
- Venue: Magic Place
- City: Bucharest, Romania

Event chronology
Colosseum Tournament 5	SUPERKOMBAT Dream	Colosseum Tournament 6

SUPERKOMBAT Dream was a kickboxing event produced by the Superkombat Fighting Championship that took place on March 25, 2018, at the Magic Place in Bucharest, Romania.

=== Results ===
SUPERKOMBAT Dream (FightBox)
Weight Class				Method	Round	Time	Notes
Light Heavyweight 81 kg	(North Macedonia) Daniel Stefanovski	def.	(Romania) Adelin Mihăilă	KO (punches)	1	1:34	For the inaugural SUPERKOMBAT Light Heavyweight Championship
Cruiserweight 86 kg	(Romania) Claudiu Alexe	def.	(Romania) Dumitru Țopai	Decision (unanimous)	3	3:00	
Heavyweight 96+ kg	(Switzerland) Patrick Schmid	def.	(Serbia) Saša Polugić	Decision (unanimous)	3	3:00	
Light Heavyweight 81 kg	(Romania) Alex Filip	def.	(Italy) Gennaro Coriolano	KO (leg kick)	1	2:16	
Cruiserweight 86 kg	(Romania) Cosmin Ionescu	def.	(Romania) Ionuț Spătărelu	TKO (retirement)	1	2:15	
Heavyweight 96+ kg	(Romania) Valentin Bordianu	def.	(Romania) Cristian Bătan	TKO (leg kicks)	2	2:04	
Heavyweight 96+ kg	(Romania) Ion Grigore	def.	(Romania) Raul Manoilă	TKO (punches)	2	2:01	
Heavyweight 96+ kg	(Romania) Alexandru Radnev	def.	(Romania) Daniel Ionescu	Decision (split)	3	3:00	
Welterweight 65 kg	(Romania) Florin Lupu	def.	(Romania) Mihai Popa	Decision (unanimous)	3	3:00	

== Colosseum Tournament 6 ==
Colosseum Tournament 6
- Promotion: Colosseum Tournament
- Date: April 20, 2018
- Venue: Sala Polivalentă
- City: Iaşi, Romania

Event chronology
SUPERKOMBAT Dream	Colosseum Tournament 6	OSS Fighters 01

Colosseum Tournament 6 was a kickboxing event produced by the Colosseum Tournament that took place on April 20, 2018, at the Sala Polivalentă in Iaşi, Romania.

=== Results ===
Colosseum Tournament 6 (FightBox)
Weight Class				Method	Round	Time	Notes
95 kg	(Romania) Sebastian Cozmâncă	def.	(Germany) Frederik Kretschmer	KO (right high kick)	1	2:57	For the Colosseum Tournament World -95 kg Championship
86 kg	(Romania) Sebastian Ciobanu	def.	(Italy) Paolo Rovelli	Decision (unanimous)	3	3:00	
72,5 kg	(Romania) Amansio Paraschiv	def.	(Spain) Simon Mendès	Decision (unanimous)	3	3:00	
71 kg	(Romania) Madalin Crăciunică	def.	(Romania) Andrei Leuştean	Decision (unanimous)	3	3:00	
81 kg	(Romania) Flavius Boiciuc	def.	(Romania) Florin Lambagiu	Decision (unanimous)	3	3:00	
86 kg	(Romania) Vlad Hurduc	def.	(Moldova) Alexandru Velenciuc	Decision (unanimous)	3	3:00	
65 kg	(Romania) Marius Grăunte	def.	(Romania) Cosmin Mărcuţă	TKO	1	1:47	
67 kg	(Romania) Marian Lăpușneanu	def.	(Romania) Ştefan Irimia	Decision (unanimous)	3	3:00	
75 kg	(Ukraine) Maxim Pleshko	def.	(Moldova) Nicolae Tamazlicaru	Decision (unanimous)	3	3:00	
71 kg	(Moldova) Radu Copăceanu	def.	(Romania) Marian Dinu	Decision (unanimous)	3	3:00	

== OSS Fighters 01 ==
OSS Fighters 01
- Promotion: OSS Fighters
- Date: April 20, 2018
- Venue: Sala Sporturilor
- City: Constanța, Romania

Event chronology
Colosseum Tournament 6	OSS Fighters 01	GFC 4

OSS Fighters 01 was a kickboxing event produced by the OSS Fighters that took place on April 20, 2018, at the Sala Sporturilor in Constanța, Romania.

=== Results ===
OSS Fighters 1
Weight Class				Method	Round	Time	Notes
96 kg	(Romania) Bogdan Stoica	def.	(Lithuania) Mantas Rimdeika	Decision	3	3:00	
75 kg	(Romania) Daniel Pattvean	def.	(Romania) Anghel Cardoș	Decision	3	3:00	Tournament Final
88,2 kg	(Romania) Costin Mincu	def.	(Hungary) Tibor Varga	KO	1	2:01	For the WKF World -88,2 kg Championship
72 kg	(Romania) Cristian Milea	def.	(Romania) Bogdan Costan	Decision	3	3:00	
75 kg	(Romania) Anghel Cardoș	def.	(Romania) Robert Gontineac	Decision	3	3:00	Tournament Semi-Finals
75 kg	(Romania) Daniel Pattvean	def.	(Moldova) Valentin Pascali	Decision	3	3:00	Tournament Semi-Finals
96+ kg	(Romania) Marian Rusu	def.	(United Kingdom) Jan Lysak	KO	1	0:29	
75 kg	(Romania) Anghel Cardoș	def.	(Romania) Florentin Ionescu	KO	1	1:39	Tournament Quarter-Finals
75 kg	(Romania) Alin Cîmpan	def.	(Romania) Robert Gontineac	Decision	3	3:00	Tournament Quarter-Finals
75 kg	(Romania) Daniel Pattvean	def.	(Romania) Eugen Dragomir	Decision	3	3:00	Tournament Quarter-Finals
75 kg	(Romania) Valentin Pascali	def.	(Romania) Andrei Șumfelean	KO	1	0:53	Tournament Quarter-Finals
95 kg	(Romania) Alex Mâțu	def.	(Romania) Marian Radu	KO	1	2:38	
86 kg	(Romania) Dragoș Imbrea	def.	(Romania) Alin Constantin	KO	3	1:41	
65 kg	(Romania) David Scurtu	def.	(Romania) Liviu Iancu	KO	1	0:59	
60 kg	(Romania) Sebastian Dinu	def.	(Romania) Eduard Jipeanu	KO	1	2:15	
60 kg	(Romania) Ionuț Sîrbu	def.	(Romania) Cornel Costea	Decision	3	3:00	
Women's 60 kg	(Romania) Nicoleta Cotun	def.	(Romania) Raluca Costache	Decision	3	3:00	
85 kg	(Romania) Robert Isop	def.	(Romania) Adrian Răduț	Decision	3	3:00	

== GFC 4 ==
GFC 4
- Promotion: Golden Fighter Championship
- Date: April 28, 2018
- Venue: Varna Palace
- City: Varna, Bulgaria

Event chronology
OSS Fighters 01	GFC 4	Colosseum Tournament 7

GFC 4 (also known as Bulgaria vs. Romania) was a kickboxing event produced by the Golden Fighter Championship that took place on April 28, 2018, at the Varna Palace in Varna, Bulgaria.

=== Fight card ===
GFC 4
Weight Class				Method	Round	Time	Notes
Light Heavyweight	(Romania) Adrian Mitu	def.	(Bulgaria) Rangel Ivanov	Decision	3	3:00	
Light Welterweight	(Romania) Adrian Maxim	def.	(Bulgaria) Ali Uzeir	Decision	3	3:00	
Light Heavyweight	(Bulgaria) Eduard Aleksanyan	def.	(Romania) Alex Filip	KO (right hook)	2	1:15	
Lightweight	(Bulgaria) Konstantin Mihailov	def.	(Romania) Gabriel Cobzaru	Decision	3	3:00	
Welterweight	(Romania) Adrian Pețenchea	def.	(Bulgaria) Hristian Andonov	Decision	3	3:00	

== Colosseum Tournament 7 ==
Colosseum Tournament 7
- Promotion: Colosseum Tournament
- Date: May 24, 2018
- Venue: Sala Polivalentă
- City: Bucharest, Romania

Event chronology
GFC 4	Colosseum Tournament 7	Dynamite Fighting Show 1

Colosseum Tournament 7 was a kickboxing event produced by the Colosseum Tournament that took place on May 24, 2018, at the Sala Polivalentă in Bucharest, Romania.

=== Results ===
Colosseum Tournament 7 (FightBox)
Weight Class				Method	Round	Time	Notes
Women's 65 kg	(Romania) Cristiana Stancu	def.	(Netherlands) Marleen Okx	KO (right punch)	2	1:05	For the Colosseum Tournament European Women's -65 kg Championship
95 kg	(Romania) Sebastian Cozmâncă	def.	(Romania) Marius Munteanu	TKO (towel thrown)	2	2:19	
72,5 kg	(Romania) Amansio Paraschiv	def.	(Georgia (country)) Otar Gogoberichvili	Decision (unanimous)	3	3:00	
75 kg	(Romania) Mirel Drăgan	def.	(Azerbaijan) Afsun Arzumanli	TKO (injury)	2	1:45	
81 kg	(Romania) David Constantin	def.	(Romania) Răzvan Mustață	TKO	2	0:56	
81 kg	(Austria) Florian Bartl	def.	(Romania) Florin Boiciuc	Decision (unanimous)	3	3:00	
63,5 kg	(Romania) Florin Stan	def.	(Moldova) Nicolae Piruțchi	Decision (unanimous)	3	3:00	
86 kg	(Romania) Dragoş Imbrea	def.	(Romania) Costin Mincu	TKO	1	1:36	
81 kg	(Romania) Alexandru Irimia	def.	(Romania) Cătălin Graure	Decision (split)	3	3:00	
71 kg	(Romania) Marian Dinu	def.	(Romania) Haris Ferizović	Decision (split)	3	3:00	

== Dynamite Fighting Show 1 ==
Dynamite Fighting Show 1
- Promotion: Dynamite Fighting Show
- Date: July 5, 2018
- Venue: Sala Polivalentă
- City: Bucharest, Romania
- Attendance: 4,300

Event chronology
Colosseum Tournament 7	Dynamite Fighting Show 1	ACB KB 16

Dynamite Fighting Show 1 (also known as Moroșanu vs. Kemayo) was a combat sport event produced by the Dynamite Fighting Show that took place on July 5, 2018, at the Sala Polivalentă in Bucharest, Romania.

=== Results ===
Dynamite Fighting Show 1 (FightBox)
Weight Class				Method	Round	Time	Notes
Heavyweight	(Romania) Cătălin Moroșanu	def.	(France) Freddy Kemayo	Decision (unanimous)	3	3:00	
Heavyweight (Boxing)	(Romania) Benjamin Adegbuyi	def.	(Georgia (country)) Aleksander Lepsveridze	KO (right hook)	1	0:57	
Light Heavyweight	(Romania) Ion Pascu	def.	(Moldova) Maxim Zaplîtni	Decision (unanimous)	3	3:00	
Heavyweight	(Romania) Sebastian Cozmâncă	def.	(Germany) Gordon Haupt	KO (right high kick)	1	1:34	
Heavyweight	(Romania) Cristian Ristea	def.	(Montenegro) Miroslav Vujović	Decision (split)	3	3:00	
Middleweight	(Romania) Amansio Paraschiv	def.	(Tajikistan) Waldemar Nuriddinov	TKO (doctor stoppage/spinning backfist)	3	1:58	
Light Heavyweight	(Romania) Bogdan Năstase	def.	(Guinea-Bissau) Janilson da Cruz	KO (right hook)	1	2:53	
Super Middleweight	(Romania) Claudiu Bădoi	def.	(Romania) Cezar Buzdugan	Decision (unanimous)	3	3:00	
Light Heavyweight (Kyokushin)	(Ukraine) Eldar Ismailov	def.	(Romania) Cătălin Mocanu	Decision (unanimous)	3	2:00	
Heavyweight	(Romania) Alexandru Radnev	def.	(Romania) Raul Manoilă	TKO (doctor stoppage/nose injury)	3	3:00	
Light Heavyweight	(Romania) Mădălin Mogoş	def.	(Romania) Costin Mincu	Decision (unanimous)	3	3:00	

=== Awards ===
- Performance of the Night: Bogdan Năstase

== ACB KB 16 ==
ACB KB 16
- Promotion: ACB
- Date: July 13, 2018
- Venue: Unirii Plaza
- City: Târgoviște, Romania
- Attendance: 1,500

Event chronology
Dynamite Fighting Show 1	ACB KB 16	OSS Fighters 02/GFC 5

ACB KB 16 (also known as Clash of Titans) was a kickboxing event produced by the ACB that took place on July 13, 2018, at the Unirii Plaza in Târgoviște, Romania.

=== Fight card ===
ACB KB 16 (FightBox)
Weight Class				Method	Round	Time	Notes
95 kg	(Suriname) Donegi Abena	def.	(Romania) Andrei Stoica	Decision (unanimous)	3	3:00	
70 kg	(Russia) Adsalam Barkinkhoev	def.	(Netherlands) Albert Kraus	Decision (unanimous)	3	3:00	
77 kg	(Romania) Daniel Pattvean	def.	(Russia) Islam Khozhdevdiev	KO (punches)	1	2:59	
70 kg	(Ukraine) Stanislav Kazantsev	vs.	(Belarus) Farkhad Akhmedzhanov	Draw	3	3:00	
77 kg	(Romania) Adelin Mihăilă	def.	(France) Djibril Ehouo	TKO (punches)	1	2:15	
Undercard
67 kg	(Netherlands) Damian Johansen	def.	(Romania) David Constantin	KO (knees)	1	1:16	
67 kg	(Russia) Tamerlan Bashirov	def.	(Romania) Călin Petrișor	Decision (unanimous)	3	3:00	
95 kg	(Netherlands) Max van Gelder	def.	(Hungary) Ferenc Szalma	TKO (leg injury)	1	1:43	
58 kg	(Russia) Bashlam Amadov	def.	(Romania) Leonard Stoean	Decision (unanimous)	3	3:00	
85 kg	(Romania) Claudiu Alexe	def.	(Romania) Adrian Cibu	TKO (referee stoppage)	1	2:54	

== OSS Fighters 02/GFC 5 ==
OSS Fighters 02/GFC 5
- Promotion: OSS Fighters/Golden Fighter Championship
- Date: August 24, 2018
- Venue: Piațeta Cazino
- City: Mamaia, Romania
- Attendance: 5,000

Event chronology
ACB KB 16	OSS Fighters 02/GFC 5	Colosseum Tournament 8

OSS Fighters 02/GFC 5 (also known as Romania vs. China II) was a kickboxing event produced by the OSS Fighters and the Golden Fighter Championship, and co-promoted with Wu Lin Feng. It took place on August 24, 2018, at the Piațeta Cazino in Mamaia, Romania.

=== Fight card ===
OSS Fighters 02/GFC 5 (FightBox)
Weight Class				Method	Round	Time	Notes
95 kg	(Romania) Andrei Stoica	def.	(Lithuania) Tomas Steponkevicius	Decision (unanimous)	3	3:00	
69,5 kg	(Romania) Cristian Milea	def.	(France) Kamara Madické	Decision (unanimous)	5	3:00	For the WKF World Super Welterweight Championship
80 kg	(Romania) Enzo Mincă	def.	(Romania) Mustafa Özel	Decision (unanimous)	3	3:00	
93 kg	(China) Hao Guanghua	def.	(Romania) Bogdan Stoica	DQ (illegal knee strike)	3	1:05	
64 kg	(Romania) Adrian Maxim	def.	(China) Jin Ying	Decision (unanimous)	3	3:00	
72,5 kg	(Romania) Gabriel Bozan	def.	(China) Li Zi Kai	Decision (unanimous)	3	3:00	
87 kg	(Romania) Dragoş Imbrea	vs.	(China) Zhou Wei	No contest (cut)	1	2:11	
77 kg	(Romania) Adrian Mitu	def.	(China) Li Hui Chao	Decision (unanimous)	3	3:00	
75 kg	(Romania) Valentin Pascali	def.	(China) Ma Shuo	Decision (unanimous)	3	3:00	
62,5 kg	(Romania) Cristian Spetcu	def.	(China) Fang Feida	Decision (unanimous)	3	3:00	
71 kg	(China) Song Shao Qiu	def.	(Romania) Marian Dinu	Decision (unanimous)	3	3:00	
78 kg	(China) Chen Douli	def.	(Romania) Mirel Iacob	Decision (split)	3	3:00	

== Colosseum Tournament 8 ==
Colosseum Tournament 8
- Promotion: Colosseum Tournament
- Date: September 17, 2018
- Venue: Sala Polivalentă
- City: Bucharest, Romania

Event chronology
OSS Fighters 02/GFC 5	Colosseum Tournament 8	APP Fight Night 01

Colosseum Tournament 8 was a kickboxing event produced by the Colosseum Tournament that took place on September 17, 2018, at the Sala Polivalentă in Bucharest, Romania.

=== Results ===
Colosseum Tournament 8 (FightBox)
Weight Class				Method	Round	Time	Notes
81 kg	(Romania) Eduard Gafencu	def.	(Romania) Adelin Mihăilă	KO (right hook and double left hook)	3	0:22	Tournament Final. For the inaugural Colosseum Tournament World -81 kg Championship
86 kg	(Romania) Cosmin Ionescu	def.	(Bulgaria) Aleksandar Petrov	Decision	4	3:00	Tournament Final. For the inaugural Colosseum Tournament World -86 kg Championship
Women's 65 kg	(Romania) Cristiana Stancu	def.	(Morocco) Ibtissam Kassrioui	Decision (split)	3	3:00	
75 kg	(Romania) Daniel Pattvean	def.	(Bulgaria) Radoslav Kostov	Decision (split)	4	3:00	
75 kg	(Romania) Alin Cîmpan	def.	(Romania) Mihai Zmărăndescu	Decision (split)	3	3:00	
65 kg	(Romania) Florin Pîrtea	def.	(Romania) Ștefan Tănase	Decision (unanimous)	3	3:00	
81 kg	(Romania) Eduard Gafencu	def.	(Romania) Adrian Cibu	KO (flurry of punches)	1	2:57	Tournament Semi-Finals
81 kg	(Romania) Adelin Mihăilă	def.	(Romania) Mădălin Mogoş	Decision	4	3:00	Tournament Semi-Finals
86 kg	(Bulgaria) Aleksandar Petrov	def.	(Romania) Dragoş Imbrea	Decision	4	3:00	Tournament Semi-Finals
86 kg	(Romania) Cosmin Ionescu	def.	(Romania) Ciprian Șchiopu	KO (right punch)	3	1:50	Tournament Semi-Finals
71 kg	(Romania) Marian Dinu	def.	(Romania) Andrei Bujor	Decision (unanimous)	4	3:00	

== APP Fight Night 01 ==
APP Fight Night 01
- Promotion: APP Fighting Promotion
- Date: October 8, 2018
- Venue: Hotel Lux Divina
- City: Brașov, Romania
- Attendance: 1,200

Event chronology
Colosseum Tournament 8	APP Fight Night 01	Dynamite Fighting Show 2

APP Fight Night 01 was a kickboxing event produced by the APP Fighting Promotion that took place on October 8, 2018, at the Hotel Lux Divina in Brașov, Romania.

=== Results ===
APP Fight Night 01
Weight Class				Method	Round	Time	Notes
72,5 kg	(Romania) Amansio Paraschiv	def.	(Morocco) Ayoub Abdelkader	KO (liver knee)	1	2:54	
72,5 kg	(Romania) Andrei Ostrovanu	def.	(Romania) Daniel Pattvean	Decision (split)	4	3:00	
72,5 kg	(Romania) Ionuț Sugacevschi	def.	(France) Zakkaria Zourki	Decision (unanimous)	3	3:00	
67 kg	(Italy) Ivan Naccari	def.	(Romania) Cosmin Mărcuţă	Decision (unanimous)	3	3:00	
67 kg	(Romania) Mădălin Crăciunică	def.	(Romania) Călin Petrișor	TKO (doctor stoppage/cut)	1	3:00	Tournament Final
91 kg	(Romania) Viorel Butnaru	def.	(Moldova) Nicolai Garbuz	Decision (unanimous)	3	3:00	
81 kg	(Romania) Alexandru Irimia	def.	(Italy) Nicola Severi	Decision	3	3:00	
67 kg	(Romania) Alexandru Marton	def.	(Romania) Bogdan Suru	Decision (unanimous)	3	3:00	
62,5 kg	(Romania) Ionuț Popa	def.	(Moldova) Nicolae Piruțchi	Decision (unanimous)	3	3:00	
77 kg	(Romania) Lucian Casoni	def.	(Romania) Andrei Vasincă	KO (jumping knee)	2	2:00	
86 kg	(Romania) Alexandru Burada	def.	(Romania) Nicolai Buceac	TKO (referee stoppage/right leg injury)	1	1:30	
67 kg	(Romania) Călin Petrișor	def.	(Romania) Vlad Trif	Decision	3	3:00	Tournament Semi-Finals
67 kg	(Romania) Mădălin Crăciunică	def.	(Romania) Marian Lăpuşneanu	Decision (unanimous)	3	3:00	Tournament Semi-Finals
81 kg	(Romania) Alexandru Gavrilă	def.	(Romania) Adrian Florea	TKO (retirement)	2	3:00	

== Dynamite Fighting Show 2 ==
Dynamite Fighting Show 2
- Promotion: Dynamite Fighting Show
- Date: October 19, 2018
- Venue: Sala Polivalentă
- City: Piatra Neamț, Romania
- Total gate: 4,500

Event chronology
APP Fight Night 01	Dynamite Fighting Show 2	Colosseum Tournament 9

Dynamite Fighting Show 2 (also known as Battle of Moldavia) was a kickboxing and kyokushin event produced by the Dynamite Fighting Show that took place on October 19, 2018, at the Sala Polivalentă in Piatra Neamț, Romania. The event was sold out.

=== Results ===
Dynamite Fighting Show 2
Weight Class				Method	Round	Time	Notes
Heavyweight	(Romania) Cătălin Moroșanu	def.	(Turkey) Mehmet Özer	KO (left low kick)	1	2:49	
Heavyweight	(Romania) Andrei Stoica	def.	(Switzerland) Sazan Memedi	Decision (unanimous)	3	3:00	
Heavyweight	(Romania) Sebastian Cozmâncă	def.	(Romania) Valentin Bordianu	KO (right hook)	2	2:17	For the Dynamite Fighting Show Heavyweight Championship.
Open Weight	(Romania) Bogdan Năstase	def.	(Cuba) Fredi Gonzales	TKO (three knockdown rule)	1	2:25	
Open Weight (Kyokushin)	(Ukraine) Eldar Ismailov	def.	(Romania) Bogdan Pralea	Decision (unanimous)	3	2:00	
Open Weight	(Romania) Florin Lambagiu	def.	(Romania) Alexandru Radnev	Decision (unanimous)	3	3:00	
Heavyweight	(Romania) Marius Munteanu	def.	(Italy) Claudio Istrate	DQ (illegal punch)	3	1:57	
Open Weight (Taekwondo)	(Ukraine) Artem Byelov	def.	(Romania) Marius Dancu	Decision (unanimous)	3	2:00	
Heavyweight	(Romania) Alexandru Stoica	def.	(Romania) Flavius Cădăraş	Decision (unanimous)	3	3:00	
Heavyweight	(Romania) Dumitru Țîră	def.	(Romania) Alexandru Mâțu	TKO (leg injury)	2	2:40	
Open Weight	(Romania) Adrian Mitu	def.	(Romania) Cătălin Oprea	Decision (unanimous)	3	3:00	

=== Awards ===
- Fight of the Night: Florin Lambagiu vs. Alexandru Radnev

== Colosseum Tournament 9 ==
Colosseum Tournament 9
- Promotion: Colosseum Tournament
- Date: October 29, 2018
- Venue: BTarena
- City: Cluj-Napoca, Romania
- Attendance: 10,000

Event chronology
Dynamite Fighting Show 2	Colosseum Tournament 9	SAS Gym 01

Colosseum Tournament 9 (also known as Ghiță vs. Poturak) was a kickboxing event produced by the Colosseum Tournament that took place on October 29, 2018, at the BTarena in Cluj-Napoca, Romania.

=== Results ===
Colosseum Tournament 9 (FightBox)
Weight Class				Method	Round	Time	Notes
95+ kg	(Romania) Daniel Ghiță	def.	(Bosnia and Herzegovina) Dževad Poturak	TKO (towel thrown)	1	1:38	
65 kg	(Romania) Adrian Maxim	def.	(Moldova) Dmitrii Sîrbu	Decision (unanimous)	3	3:00	
75 kg	(Romania) Eduard Chelariu	def.	(Romania) Laurențiu Negru	Decision (unanimous)	3	3:00	
91 kg	(Romania) Cosmin Ionescu	def.	(Romania) Ştefan Veber	KO (low kicks and punches)	2	0:15	
66 kg	(Moldova) Andrei Pisari	vs.	(Romania) Ionuț Popa	Draw	4	3:00	
95+ kg	(Romania) Ionuț Iancu	def.	(Romania) Dumitru Ţopai	Decision (unanimous)	3	3:00	
75 kg	(Romania) Daniel Pattvean	def.	(Romania) Alexandru Curcudel	TKO (doctor stoppage/cut)	1	0:51	
66 kg	(Romania) Daniel Corbeanu	def.	(Moldova) Serghei Zanosiev	KO (left high kick)	4	1:01	
71 kg	(Romania) Andrei Verde	def.	(Romania) Bogdan Suru	Decision (split)	3	3:00	
78 kg	(Romania) Flavius Boiciuc	def.	(Romania) Cristian Stoica	Decision (unanimous)	3	3:00	
67 kg	(Romania) Alexandru Marton	def.	(Romania) Adrian Baciu	Decision (split)	3	3:00	

== SAS Gym 01 ==
SAS Gym 01
- Promotion: SAS Gym
- Date: November 2, 2018
- Venue: SAS Gym
- City: Bucharest, Romania

Event chronology
Colosseum Tournament 9	SAS Gym 01	Dynamite Fighting Show 3

SAS Gym 01 was a kickboxing event produced by the SAS Gym that took place on November 2, 2018, at the SAS Gym in Bucharest, Romania.

=== Results ===
SAS Gym 01
Weight Class				Method	Round	Time	Notes
Lightweight 71 kg	(Romania) Sorin Căliniuc	def.	(Romania) Cristian Milea	Decision	4	3:00	Lightweight Tournament Final
Lightweight 71 kg	(Romania) Călin Petrișor	def.	(Romania) Cosmin Mărcuţă	Decision	3	3:00	
Lightweight 71 kg	(Romania) Sorin Căliniuc	def.	(Romania) Bogdan Costan	Decision	3	3:00	Lightweight Tournament Semi-Finals
Lightweight 71 kg	(Romania) Cristian Milea	def.	(Romania) Mădălin Crăciunică	—N/a	—N/a	—N/a	Lightweight Tournament Semi-Finals

== Dynamite Fighting Show 3 ==
Dynamite Fighting Show 3
- Promotion: Dynamite Fighting Show
- Date: December 14, 2018
- Venue: Sala Polivalentă
- City: Craiova, Romania
- Total gate: 5,000

Event chronology
SAS Gym 01	Dynamite Fighting Show 3	Colosseum Tournament 10

Dynamite Fighting Show 3 (also known as Oltenia burns) was a combat sport event produced by the Dynamite Fighting Show that took place on December 14, 2018, at the Sala Polivalentă in Craiova, Romania.

=== Results ===
Dynamite Fighting Show 3
Weight Class				Method	Round	Time	Notes
Heavyweight	(Romania) Cătălin Moroșanu	def.	(Croatia) Ivo Ćuk	KO (punches)	1	0:31	
Cruiserweight	(Romania) Andrei Stoica	def.	(Portugal) Luis Morais	KO (left uppercut and left hook)	1	0:53	
Light Heavyweight	(Romania) Bogdan Năstase	def.	(Romania) Alex Filip	TKO (arm injury)	2	1:32	
Heavyweight (Boxing)	(Romania) Mihai Nistor	def.	(Romania) Ionel Osvad	TKO (retirement)	2	3:00	
Middleweight	(Romania) Amansio Paraschiv	def.	(Albania) Isteri Mitat	Decision (unanimous)	3	3:00	
Open Weight	(Romania) Ciprian Șchiopu	def.	(Romania) Ionuț Iancu	Decision (unanimous)	3	3:00	
Light Heavyweight	(Romania) Adrian Mitu	def.	(Netherlands) Guillermo Blokland	Decision (unanimous)	3	3:00	
Heavyweight	(Romania) Valentin Bordianu	def.	(Romania) Raul Manoilă	KO (right low kick)	3	2:20	
Open Weight (Brazilian jiu-jitsu)	(Romania) Daniel Liță	def.	(Romania) Alexandru Crişan	Submission (armbar)	1	2:10	
Heavyweight	(Romania) Alexandru Radnev	def.	(Romania) Eugen Mailat	TKO (referee stoppage/shoulder injury)	2	2:40	
Light Heavyweight	(Romania) Marius Tiţă	def.	(Romania) Ionuț Toca	KO (punch)	1	2:25	
Heavyweight	(Romania) Marius Munteanu	def.	(Hungary) David Mihajlov	Decision (unanimous)	3	3:00	
Welterweight	(Romania) Daniel Corbeanu	def.	(Romania) Călin Petrișor	Decision (unanimous)	3	3:00	

=== Awards ===
- Fight of the Night: Ciprian Șchiopu vs. Ionuț Iancu

== Colosseum Tournament 10 ==
Colosseum Tournament 10
- Promotion: Colosseum Tournament
- Date: December 14, 2018
- Venue: Sala Constantin Jude
- City: Timișoara, Romania

Event chronology
Dynamite Fighting Show 3	Colosseum Tournament 10	OSS Fighters 03

Colosseum Tournament 10 was a kickboxing event produced by the Colosseum Tournament that took place on December 14, 2018, at the Sala Constantin Jude in Timișoara, Romania.

=== Results ===
Colosseum Tournament 10 (FightBox)
Weight Class				Method	Round	Time	Notes
Women's 65 kg	(Italy) Cristina Caruso	def.	(Romania) Cristiana Stancu	Decision (split)	5	3:00	For the WAKO-Pro World Women's -65 kg Championship
95+ kg	(France) Jordan Kalachnikoff	def.	(Bosnia and Herzegovina) Dževad Poturak	Decision (unanimous)	3	3:00	
91 kg	(Romania) Sasa Marcov	def.	(Romania) Lucian Fule	TKO (referee stoppage)	1	1:03	
81 kg	(Romania) Radu Medeleanu	def.	(Romania) Caius Gazibara	Decision (unanimous)	3	3:00	
81 kg	(Romania) Eduard Gafencu	def.	(Romania) Flavius Boiciuc	Decision (unanimous)	3	3:00	
71 kg	(Romania) Haris Ferizović	def.	(Romania) Marian Dinu	Decision (split)	3	3:00	
86 kg	(Romania) Cosmin Ionescu	def.	(Romania) Robert Burtea	KO (left high kick)	1	2:21	
71 kg	(Romania) Andrei Ostrovanu	def.	(Romania) Tarkan Ismail	Decision (unanimous)	3	3:00	
75 kg	(Romania) Daniel Pattvean	def.	(Bulgaria) Bogdan Shumarov	Decision (split)	4	3:00	
95+ kg	(Romania) Costin Mincu	def.	(Romania) Dumitru Ţopai	TKO (doctor stoppage)	3	1:57	
70 kg	(Romania) Marian Timofte	def.	(Romania) Adrian Baciu	KO (punches)	1	1:40	

== See also ==
- 2018 in Glory
- 2018 in K-1
- 2018 in Kunlun Fight
- 2018 in ONE Championship
- 2018 in Glory of Heroes
