= Sorin Căliniuc =

Romanian professional kickboxer and Olympic boxer

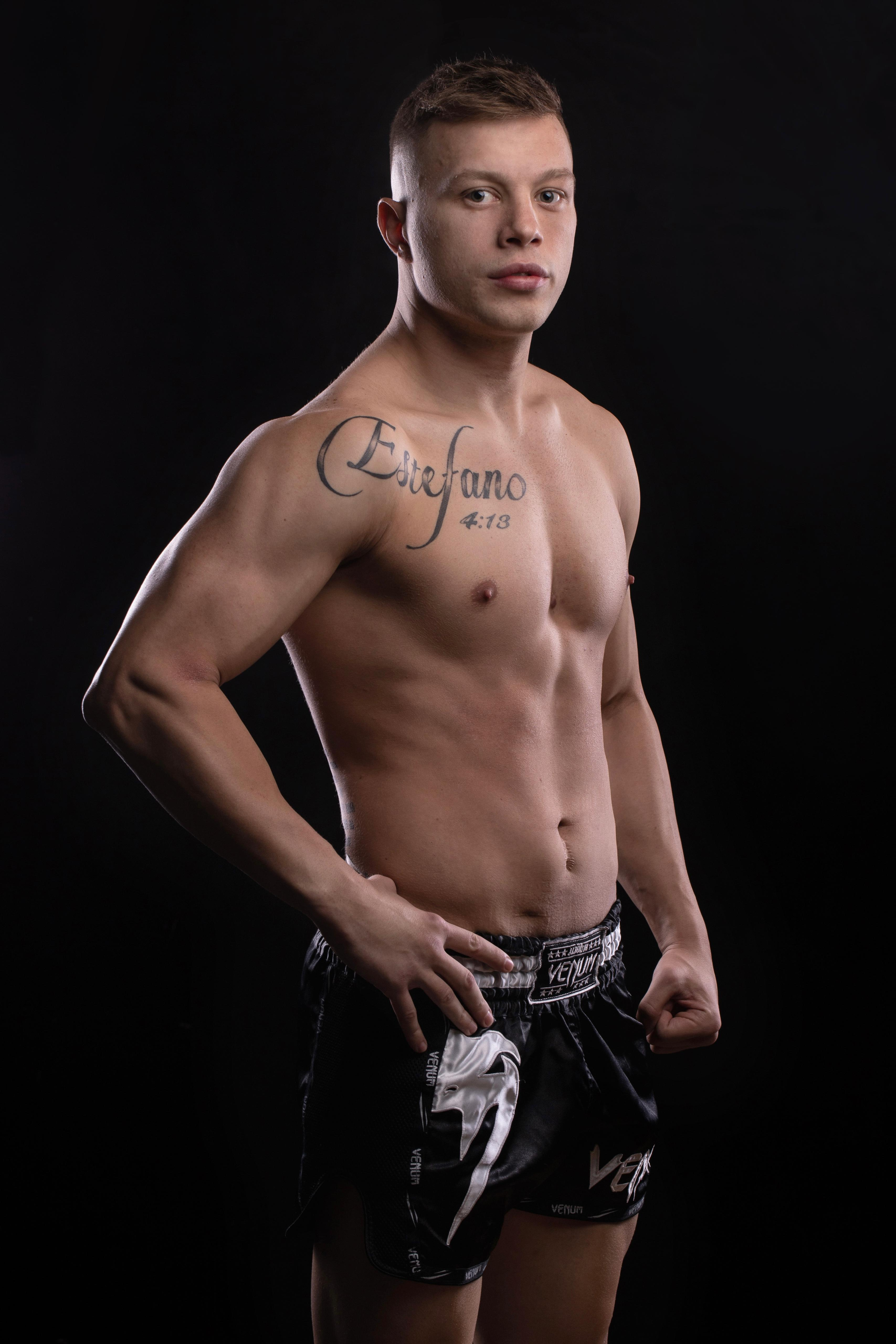
- Born: Sorin Mihai Căliniuc; July 12, 1996 (age 30); Bucharest, Romania
- Other names: Ronin; Baby Face (former)
- Nationality: Romanian
- Height: 1.76 m (5 ft 9 1/2 in)
- Weight: 70 kg (150 lb; 11 st)
- Division: Light middleweight (2018–present); Middleweight (2020)
- Fighting out of: Bucharest, Romania
- Team: MMA Estéfano Team/SAS Gym (2018–2025); Predators Fight Gym (2025–present)
- Trainer: Estéfano Tănăsescu Popescu (2018–2025)
- Years active: 2018–present

Kickboxing record
- Total: 13
- Wins: 11
- By knockout: 0
- Losses: 2
- By knockout: 0
- Draws: 0

Other information
- Boxing record from BoxRec
- Last updated on: October 7, 2023

Sorin Mihai Căliniuc (born 12 July 1996) is a Romanian professional kickboxer and Olympic boxer, and former kempo practitioner. He currently competes in the Lightweight division for Colosseum Tournament, in which he is reigning champion of the lightweight and super lightweight divisions. A professional competitor since 2018, Căliniuc formerly competed in Glory. Căliniuc is a multiple national boxing champion and 2016 Kempo World Champion.

As of 1 January 2024, Căliniuc is ranked the #19 lightweight in the world in the kickboxing/Muay Thai combined ranking by Boxemag.

== Professional kickboxing career ==
=== Early career ===
Căliniuc practiced judo from 4 to 15 years old. He then started kickboxing at the age of 17, but not at a professional level. Căliniuc worked simultaneously as a casino security guard until he met coach and promoter Estéfano Tănăsescu Popescu who enrolled him to a gym.

==== Wins over Milea, Salvador and Dzhaniev ====
With a background of being IKF world kempo champion, Căliniuc began his kickboxing career by winning his first four fights by decision. He initially fought for SAS Gym (a Bucharest-based kickboxing promotion), where he won the SAS Gym 01 and the SAS Gym 02 tournaments.

Căliniuc faced Bogdan Costan on November 2, 2018, in the semifinals of the Lightweight Tournament at SAS Gym 01. Căliniuc won the fight via unanimous decision to progress to the final round of the tournament. He then faced Colosseum Tournament World Lightweight Champion Cristian Milea in the finals. Căliniuc defeated Milea via unanimous decision.

Căliniuc faced former Glory lightweight championship challenger Dylan Salvador on June 13, 2019, in the semifinals of the Lightweight Tournament at SAS Gym 02. Căliniuc won the fight via split decision to progress to the final round of the tournament. He then faced Muay Thai standout Khayal Dzhaniev in the finals. Căliniuc defeated Dzhaniev via unanimous decision.

=== Colosseum Tournament ===
In December 2020, it was announced that Căliniuc had signed a multi-fight deal with Colosseum Tournament.

Căliniuc faced Colosseum Tournament world lightweight champion Andrei Ostrovanu on December 18, 2020, at Colosseum Tournament 22. Căliniuc defeated Ostrovanu via unanimous 3-round decision to become the inaugural Colosseum Tournament World Super Lightweight Champion.

==== Two-division champion ====
In January 2021, it was officially announced that Căliniuc next bout would be against former ISKA world middleweight champion Gabriel Bozan for the vacant Colosseum Tournament World Lightweight Championship on 26 February at Colosseum Tournament 23. Căliniuc dominated the fight and won via unanimous 5-round decision to become the Colosseum Tournament World Lightweight Champion.

In April 2021, Colosseum Tournament announced that Căliniuc would make his first defence of his lightweight title against former KOK lightweight champion Vitalie Matei at Colosseum Tournament 25 on 31 May in Cluj-Napoca. He won the fight via unanimous 5-round decision.

==== Căliniuc vs. Koprivlenski ====
Căliniuc was scheduled to defend his title for the second time against former Glory Lightweight Contender Tournament Winner Stoyan Koprivlenski on September 20, 2021 at Colosseum Tournament 27. He retained his championship, being declared the winner via split decision.

Căliniuc was scheduled to defend his title for the third time against former Kunlun Fight World MAX Tournament Champion Dzianis Zuev on April 8, 2022 at Colosseum Tournament 30. However, due to the Russian invasion of Ukraine, Zuev removed from the card and he was replaced by Andre Mannaart's Sami Lamiri. Căliniuc dominated the bout, taking Lamiri down in the third round. He defeated Lamiri via unanimous decision.

Căliniuc was finally scheduled to make his third title defense against former Wu Lin Feng World Championship Champion Nafi Bilalovski (Filip Verlinden Gym) on June 23, 2022, at Colosseum Tournament 33. He won the fight via unanimous decision.

Căliniuc was once again scheduled to defend his title against WKN World Super Welterweight Champion Jordi Requejo, in September, 2022, at Colosseum Tournament 35. He won a unanimous decision, dominating Requejo.

On October 30, 2022, his team announced on social media that Căliniuc parted ways with Colosseum Tournament. Subsequently, Căliniuc signed a multi-fight contract with Glory on 13 December 2022.

=== GLORY ===
In his Glory promotional debut, Căliniuc faced former ISKA World Light Middleweight Champion Arman Hambaryan on February 11, 2023, at GLORY 83. He lost the fight via controversial split decision. Madfight scored the fight 29–28 for Căliniuc.

==== Căliniuc vs. Koprivlenski II ====
Căliniuc rematched Stoyan Koprivlenski in the co-main event of Glory 89 on October 7, 2023. He lost the bout via unanimous decision.

== Personal life ==
Căliniuc is a Christian.

He said his model is Daniel Ghiță. Căliniuc is inspired by Abdulrashid Sadulaev.

He is a fan of Steaua București.

== Championships and accomplishments ==
=== Kickboxing ===
- Colosseum Tournament
  - Colosseum Tournament World Lightweight Championship (one time)
    - Four successful title defenses
  - Colosseum Tournament World Super Lightweight Championship (one time)
- SAS Gym
  - SAS Gym 02 Lightweight Tournament Championship
  - SAS Gym 01 Lightweight Tournament Championship
- Kickboxing Romania Awards
  - 2024 Boxing Award
  - 2023 Fight of the Year vs. Stoyan Koprivlenski at Glory 89

=== Kempo ===
- International Kempo Federation
  - 2016 IKF World Kempo Championships Full-Kempo Rules (gold) −75.0 kg
  - 2017 IKF European Kempo Championships Full-Kempo Rules (silver) −80.0 kg

=== Boxing ===
- Romanian Boxing Federation
  - 2024 Romania National Boxing Championships (gold) −75.0 kg
  - 2022 Romanian Boxing Cup (gold) −75.0 kg
  - 2021 Romania National Boxing Championships (gold) −80.0 kg
  - 2020 Romania National Boxing Championships (gold) −75.0 kg
  - 2020 Romanian Boxing Cup (gold) −75.0 kg

== Professional kickboxing record ==
Kickboxing record
11 wins (0 KOs), 2 losses (0 KOs), 0 draws
Date	Result	Opponent	Event	Location	Method	Round	Time	Record
2023-10-07	Loss	(Bulgaria) Stoyan Koprivlenski	Glory 89	Burgas, Bulgaria	Decision (unanimous)	3	3:00	11-2-0
2023-02-11	Loss	(Belgium) Arman Hambaryan	GLORY 83	Essen, Germany	Decision (split)	3	3:00	11-1-0
2022-09-30	Win	(Spain) Jordi Requejo	Colosseum Tournament 35: Căliniuc vs. Requejo	Târgoviște, Romania	Decision (unanimous)	5	3:00	11-0-0
Defended the Colosseum Tournament World Lightweight Championship.
2022-06-23	Win	(Belgium) Nafi Bilalovski	Colosseum Tournament 33: Căliniuc vs. Bilalovski	Bucharest, Romania	Decision (unanimous)	5	3:00	10-0-0
Defended the Colosseum Tournament World Lightweight Championship.
2022-04-08	Win	(Netherlands) Sami Lamiri	Colosseum Tournament 30: Căliniuc vs. Lamiri	Malmö, Sweden	Decision (unanimous)	3	3:00	9-0-0
2021-09-20	Win	(Bulgaria) Stoyan Koprivlenski	Colosseum Tournament 27: Căliniuc vs. Koprivlenski	Oradea, Romania	Decision (split)	5	3:00	8-0-0
Defended the Colosseum Tournament World Lightweight Championship.
2021-05-31	Win	(Moldova) Vitalie Matei	Colosseum Tournament 25: Căliniuc vs. Matei	Cluj-Napoca, Romania	Decision (unanimous)	5	3:00	7-0-0
Defended the Colosseum Tournament World Lightweight Championship.
2021-02-26	Win	(Romania) Gabriel Bozan	Colosseum Tournament 23: Căliniuc vs. Bozan	Bucharest, Romania	Decision (unanimous)	5	3:00	6-0-0
Won the vacant Colosseum Tournament World Lightweight Championship.
2020-12-18	Win	(Romania) Andrei Ostrovanu	Colosseum Tournament 22: Ostrovanu vs. Căliniuc	Bucharest, Romania	Decision (unanimous)	3	3:00	5-0-0
Won the inaugural Colosseum Tournament World Super Lightweight Championship.
2019-06-13	Win	(Russia) Khayal Dzhaniev	SAS Gym 02, Final	Bucharest, Romania	Decision (unanimous)	3	3:00	4-0-0
Won the SAS Gym 02 Lightweight Tournament.
2019-06-13	Win	(France) Dylan Salvador	SAS Gym 02, Semifinals	Bucharest, Romania	Decision (split)	3	3:00	3-0-0
2018-11-02	Win	(Romania) Cristian Milea	SAS Gym 01, Final	Bucharest, Romania	Extra round decision (unanimous)	4	3:00	2-0-0
Won the SAS Gym 01 Lightweight Tournament.
2018-11-02	Win	(Romania) Bogdan Costan	SAS Gym 01, Semifinals	Bucharest, Romania	Decision (unanimous)	3	3:00	1-0-0
Legend: Win Loss Draw/no contest Notes

== See also ==
- List of male kickboxers
