= Colosseum Tournament =

Kickboxing and mixed martial arts promotion

- Type: Private
- Industry: Combat Sports
- Founded: 2016; 10 years ago
- Founder: Gabriel Georgescu
- Headquarters: Ploiești, Romania
- Key people: Gabriel Georgescu (CEO); Horia Rădulescu (Vice President)
- Website: www.colosseumkickboxing.com

The Colosseum Tournament (COLOSSEUM) is a kickboxing, mixed martial arts (MMA) and boxing promotion company based in Romania, which is owned by Gabriel Georgescu. It is one of the largest kickboxing promotions in the country, and takes its name from colosseum.

It promoted the first sanctioned professional event in Ploiești, Romania on November 26, 2016, and since its inception can be seen on Digi Sport and on FightBox in over 60 countries. On 30 June 2023, Colosseum Tournament was relaunched on Triller TV after 2017-2019.

On April 15, 2021, it was announced that Colosseum Tournament and Netherlands-based Glorious Fight Events entered a partnership. The deal encompasses commitment to promote their fighters. Colosseum Tournament also has a partnership with Prometheus Fighting Promotion.

== Events ==
Each event contains several fights. Traditionally, every event starts off with an opening fight followed by other fights, with the last fight being known as the main event.

#	Event	Date	Venue	Location	Attendance
46	Colosseum Tournament 44	Sep 27, 2024	Dumitru Popescu-Colibași Arena	Brașov, Romania	
45	Colosseum Tournament 43	Jun 28, 2024	Suceava Fortress	Suceava, Romania	
44	Colosseum Tournament 42	May 24, 2024	Olimpia Arena	Ploiești, Romania	
43	Colosseum Tournament 41	Dec 8, 2023	Olimpia Arena	Ploiești, Romania	
42	Colosseum Tournament 40	Oct 20, 2023	Lascăr Pană Arena	Baia Mare, Romania	
41	Colosseum Tournament 39	Jun 30, 2023	Suceava Fortress	Suceava, Romania	3,500
40	Colosseum Tournament 38: Lăpușneanu vs. Argyo	May 5, 2023	Dumitru Popescu-Colibași Arena	Brașov, Romania	3,100
39	Colosseum Tournament 37: Mavrodin vs. Dragomir	Nov 21, 2022	Romeo Iamandi Arena	Buzău, Romania	
38	Colosseum Tournament 36: Amariței vs. Orza	Oct 21, 2022	Botoșani Arena	Botoșani, Romania	
37	Colosseum Tournament 35: Căliniuc vs. Requejo	Sep 30, 2022	Târgoviște Arena	Târgoviște, Romania	
36	Colosseum Tournament 34: Gafencu vs. Amariței	Aug 18, 2022	Dumitru Popescu-Colibași Arena	Brașov, Romania	
35	Colosseum Tournament 33: Căliniuc vs. Bilalovski	Jun 23, 2022	Bucharest Arena	Bucharest, Romania	3,200
34	Colosseum Tournament 32: Amariței vs. Ćulafić	Jun 3, 2022	Craiova Arena	Craiova, Romania	
33	Road to Colosseum 2: Vikings vs. Gladiators	May 21, 2022	Ceres Arena	Aarhus, Denmark	Cancelled
32	Colosseum Tournament 31: Dey Grand Prix	May 9, 2022	Victoria Arena	Arad, Romania	
31	Colosseum Tournament 30: Căliniuc vs. Lamiri	Apr 8, 2022	Baltiska Hall	Malmö, Sweden	
30	Colosseum Tournament 29: Marinescu vs. Rusu	Dec 14, 2021	Arad Arena	Arad, Romania	
29	Colosseum Tournament 28: Amariței vs. Van Oeveren II	Oct 25, 2021	Ion Constantinescu Arena	Craiova, Romania	0
28	Colosseum Tournament 27: Căliniuc vs. Koprivlenski	Sep 20, 2021	Antonio Alexe Arena	Oradea, Romania	1,000 (Note: Due to the COVID-19 pandemic, the venue operated at limited capacity.)
27	Colosseum Tournament 26: Cardoș vs. Boiciuc	Aug 20, 2021	Corvin Castle	Hunedoara, Romania	1,000
26	Road to Colosseum 1: Mihăilă vs. Graidia	Jun 19, 2021	PalaRovagnati	Milan, Italy	500 (Note: Due to the COVID-19 pandemic, the venue operated at limited capacity.)
25	Colosseum Tournament 25: Căliniuc vs. Matei	May 31, 2021	ANL Hall	Cluj-Napoca, Romania	0
24	Colosseum Tournament 24: Spetcu vs. Maxim	April 1, 2021	Colosseum Tournament Studios	Bucharest, Romania	0
23	Colosseum Tournament 23: Căliniuc vs. Bozan	February 26, 2021	Colosseum Tournament Studios	Bucharest, Romania	0
22	Colosseum Tournament 22: Ostrovanu vs. Căliniuc	December 18, 2020	Colosseum Tournament Studios	Bucharest, Romania	0
21	Colosseum Tournament 21	November 27, 2020	Colosseum Tournament Studios	Bucharest, Romania	0
20	Colosseum Tournament 20	October 23, 2020	Sala Polivalentă	Arad, Romania	0
19	Colosseum Tournament 19	September 25, 2020	Undisclosed Studio	Debrecen, Hungary	0
18	Colosseum Tournament 18	August 28, 2020	Videle Ranch	Videle, Romania	Cancelled due to the Romanian government's decisions regarding COVID-19.
17	Colosseum Tournament 17	December 1, 2019	Sala Polivalentă	Bucharest, Romania	
16	Colosseum Tournament 16	October 28, 2019	Sala Transilvania	Sibiu, Romania	
15	Colosseum Tournament 15	September 22, 2019	Arena Antonio Alexe	Oradea, Romania	
14	Colosseum Tournament 14	July 20, 2019	Sala Gabriel Udișteanu	Fălticeni, Romania	
13	Colosseum Tournament 13	June 28, 2019	Sala Polivalentă	Călărași, Romania	
12	Colosseum Tournament 12	May 9, 2019	Sala Polivalentă	Arad, Romania	
11	Colosseum Tournament 11	March 29, 2019	Sala Polivalentă	Bucharest, Romania	
10	Colosseum Tournament 10	December 14, 2018	Sala Constantin Jude	Timișoara, Romania	
9	Colosseum Tournament 9: Ghiță vs. Poturak	October 29, 2018	BTarena	Cluj-Napoca, Romania	10,000
8	Colosseum Tournament 8	September 17, 2018	Sala Polivalentă	Bucharest, Romania	
7	Colosseum Tournament 7	May 24, 2018	Sala Polivalentă	Bucharest, Romania	
6	Colosseum Tournament 6	April 20, 2018	Sala Polivalentă	Iaşi, Romania	
5	Colosseum Tournament 5	February 23, 2018	Patinoarul Dunărea	Galați, Romania	
4	Colosseum Tournament 4	October 16, 2017	Sala Polivalentă	Bucharest, Romania	5,000
3	Colosseum Tournament 3: Romania vs. Germany	July 14, 2017	Arena IDU	Mamaia, Romania	
2	Colosseum Tournament 2	June 17, 2017	Stadionul Ilie Oană	Ploiești, Romania	8,000
1	Colosseum Tournament 1	November 26, 2016	Sala Sporturilor Olimpia	Ploiești, Romania	

== Prometheus Fighting Promotion ==
Prometheus FP is a brand of the Colosseum Tournament that was introduced on July 22, 2021. The brand serves as a developmental territory, featuring rookies from Romania competing to become members of Colosseum Tournament's roster. FightBox and Digi Sport are the main broadcasters of Prometheus FP.

== Notable fighters ==
- (Romania) Daniel Ghiță
- (Romania) Andrei Stoica
- (Romania) Bogdan Stoica
- (Romania) Alexandru Lungu
- (Romania) Sebastian Ciobanu
- (Romania) Ionuț Iancu
- (Romania) Amansio Paraschiv
- (Romania) Sorin Căliniuc
- (Romania) Ștefan Orza
- (Romania) Eduard Gafencu
- (Romania) Cristian Spetcu
- (Romania) Adrian Maxim
- (Romania) Cristiana Stancu
- (Romania) Gabriel Bozan
- (Romania) Ionuț Atodiresei
- (Romania) Sebastian Cozmâncă
- (Romania) Florin Lambagiu
- (Romania) Călin Petrișor
- (Romania) Alin Nechita
- (Romania) Claudiu Bădoi
- (Romania) Andrei Ostrovanu
- (Romania) Cristian Milea
- (Romania) Ionuț Popa
- (Romania) Vlad Trif
- (Moldova) Constantin Rusu
- (Moldova) Vitalie Matei
- (Moldova) Dmitrii Sîrbu
- (Moldova) Maxim Răilean
- (Bulgaria) Stoyan Koprivlenski
- (Bulgaria) Bogdan Shumarov
- (Bulgaria) Aleksandar Petrov
- (Netherlands) Michael Boapeah
- (Netherlands) Thian de Vries
- (Spain) Jordi Requejo
- (United States) Dustin Stoltzfus
- (Morocco) Ibtissam Kassrioui

== See also ==
- Colosseum Tournament in 2021
- Dynamite Fighting Show
- Golden Fighter Championship
- OSS Fighters
