= Gabriel Bozan =

Romanian kickboxer

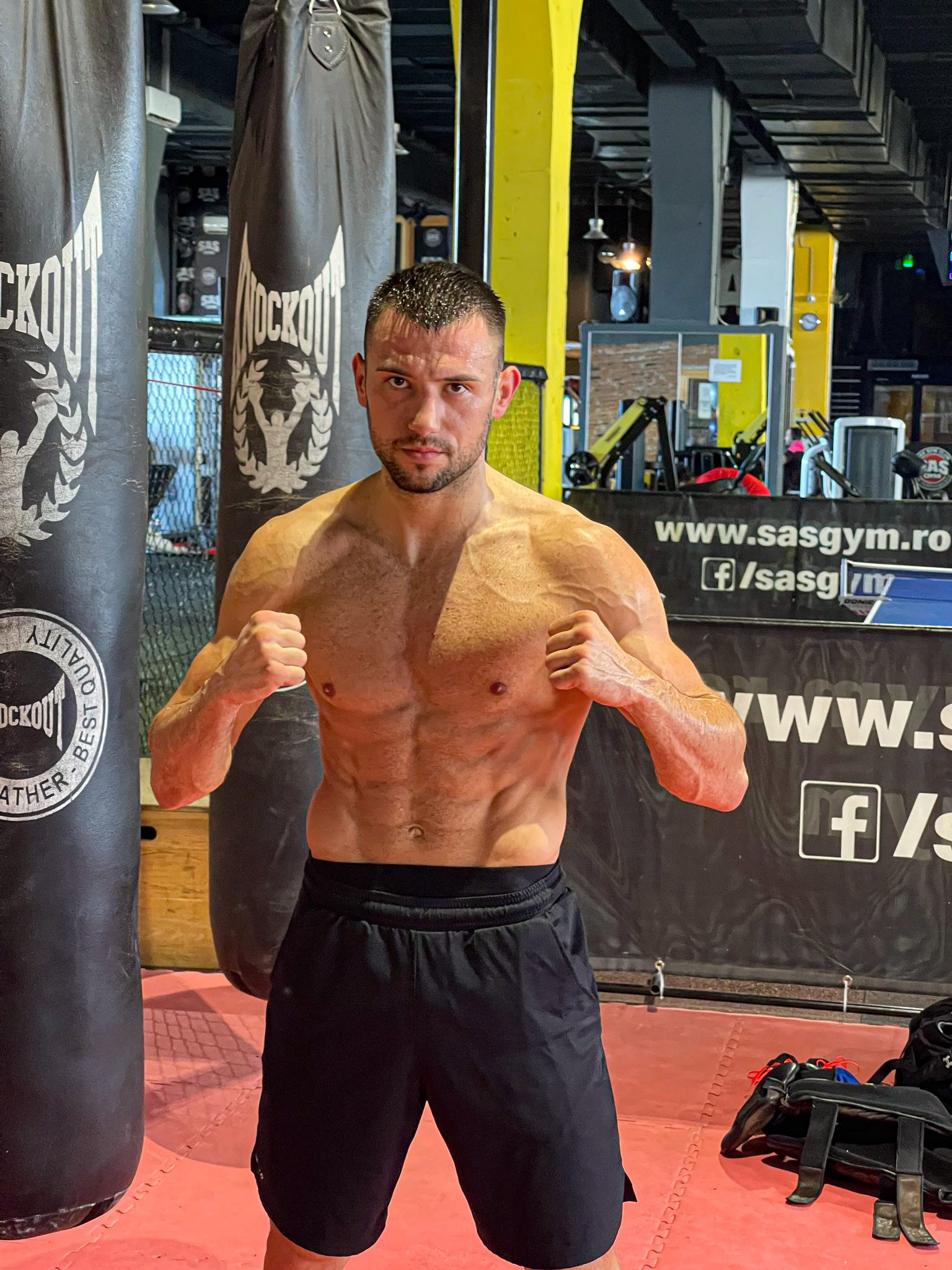
- Bozan in 2022
- Born: January 15, 1993 (age 33); Deva, Romania
- Height: 1.77 m (5 ft 9 1/2 in)
- Weight: 67 kg (148 lb; 10.6 st)
- Division: Welterweight
- Stance: Orthodox
- Fighting out of: Bucharest, Romania
- Team: MMA Estéfano Team/SAS Gym
- Trainer: Estéfano Tănăsescu Popescu
- Rank: black belt in Karate
- Years active: 2011-present

Kickboxing record
- Total: 42
- Wins: 33
- By knockout: 6
- Losses: 7
- Draws: 2
- Last updated on: September 30, 2022

Gabriel Bozan (born 15 January 1993) is a Romanian professional kickboxer. He currently competes in the Welterweight division in the Colosseum Tournament. Bozan is a former ISKA World Middleweight Champion. A professional competitor since 2011, he formerly competed for Superkombat Fighting Championship, Vendetta and Golden Fighter Championship. Bozan is also a former national junior Karate champion and junior European champion. He holds the black belt.

== Kickboxing career ==
=== Early career ===
Bozan fought in various organizations in Romania and Austria before signing with the Colosseum Tournament in 2020. He won an International Sport Karate Association (ISKA) World Middleweight title. Bozan amassed a record of 16–5 prior to joining the Colosseum Tournament.

=== Colosseum Tournament ===
Bozan was scheduled to make his Colosseum Tournament debut at Colosseum Tournament 20 against Daniel Bolfă. He won the fight via unanimous decision.

Bozan faced current Colosseum Tournament Featherweight Champion Maxim Răilean in a non-title fight on December 18, 2020 at Colosseum Tournament 22. Răilean moved up a weight class to take on him. Bozan won the fight by unanimous decision.

==== Fight against Căliniuc ====
Bozan faced Sorin Căliniuc on February 26, 2021, for the vacant Colosseum Tournament World Lightweight Championship in the main event at Colosseum Tournament 23. Bozan lost the fight via unanimous decision.

After over a year away from the ring, Bozan faced Cosmin-Mădălin Grosu on 9 May 2022 at Colosseum Tournament 31. He won the fight via technical knockout 1 second into the third round.

==== Featherweight ====
He announced that he would drop from lightweight to super featherweight for his next fight. Bozan lost a controversial decision to Eduard del Prado at Colosseum Tournament 35 on September 30, 2022.

== Training ==
Bozan used to train at Gym 23 with fellow Aleksandar Rakić, after moving to Ruben Stoia Club in Arad, Romania. From summer 2022, he is based at MMA Estéfano Team in Bucharest.

== Championships and accomplishments ==
=== Kickboxing ===
- International Sport Karate Association
  - ISKA World Middleweight Championship (one time)

== Kickboxing record ==
Kickboxing record
33 wins (6 KOs), 7 losses, 2 draws
Date	Result	Opponent	Event	Location	Method	Round	Time
2022-09-30	Loss	(Spain) Eduard del Prado	Colosseum Tournament 35	Târgoviște, Romania	Ext. R decision (unanimous)	4	3:00
2022-05-09	Win	(Romania) Cosmin-Mădălin Grosu	Colosseum Tournament 31	Arad, Romania	TKO (towel thrown)	3	0:01
2021-02-26	Loss	(Romania) Sorin Căliniuc	Colosseum Tournament 23	Bucharest, Romania	Decision (unanimous)	5	3:00
For the vacant Colosseum Tournament World Lightweight Championship.
2020-12-18	Win	(Moldova) Maxim Răilean	Colosseum Tournament 22	Bucharest, Romania	Decision (unanimous)	3	3:00
2020-10-23	Win	(Romania) Daniel Bolfă	Colosseum Tournament 20	Arad, Romania	Decision (unanimous)	3	3:00
2019-11-29	Win	(Netherlands) Dominique Pinas	GFC 6: Romania vs. Netherlands	Timișoara, Romania	KO (punches and knee)	3	2:15
2019-11-09	Win	(Turkey) Vahit İpek	Vendetta XIX	Vienna, Austria	Decision (unanimous)	5	3:00
Wins the vacant ISKA World Middleweight (-72.5kg/159.8lb) Championship.
2019-06-15	Loss	(Germany) Chris Wunn	Vendetta XVIII	Vienna, Austria	Decision (unanimous)	5	3:00
For the vacant ISKA Intercontinental Super Welterweight (-70kg/154.3lb) Championship.
2018-08-24	Win	(China) Li Zi Kai	GFC 5: Romania vs. China II	Mamaia, Romania	Decision (unanimous)	3	3:00
2017-11-04	Win	(Austria) Dietmar Schöpf	Vendetta XIV	Vienna, Austria	KO	1	1:56
2017-06-16	Win	(China) Yang Kunshan	GFC 2: Romania vs. China	Timișoara, Romania	Decision (unanimous)	3	3:00
2017-05-20	Win	(Croatia) Nikola Crvenkovič	Fight Night	Vienna, Austria	Decision	3	3:00
2015-12-12	Win	(Netherlands) Tony Blijleven	Austrian FC 2	Vienna, Austria	KO	1	2:32
Legend: Win Loss Draw/no contest Notes

== See also ==
- List of male kickboxers
