= Golden Fighter Championship =

Kickboxing promotion

- Company type: Private
- Industry: Kickboxing, Muay Thai
- Founded: 2015; 11 years ago
- Founder: Alin Fălcuşan
- Headquarters: Timișoara, Romania
- Key people: Alin Fălcuşan (CEO); Maikel Polanen (Supervisor)

The Golden Fighter Championship (GFC) is a Romanian kickboxing, Muay Thai and mixed martial arts (MMA) promotion founded in 2015 and based in Timișoara, Romania, owned by Alin Fălcuşan. It is the third largest kickboxing promotion in Romania, alongside fellow OSS Fighters.

The Golden Fighter Championship and Pro TV, and its subsidiary Pro X announced a multi-year broadcast deal on 24 September 2019, effectively ending the promotion's Digi Sport partnership. With the new TV deal and expansion in the country, the GFC has increased in popularity, and has achieved greater mainstream media coverage. The promotion also has a long-term contract with FightBox giving GFC a deal in other 60 countries.

GFS has a partnership with Wu Lin Feng of China since 2017. The GFC are also in partnership with the World Kickboxing and Karate Union (WKU). In April 2024, GFC entered into an official partnership with K-1.

== GFC Events ==
Each GFC event contains several fights. Traditionally, every event starts off with an opening fight followed by other fights, with the last fight being known as the main event.

#	Event	Date	Venue	Location
8	GFC 8: K-1 Fighting Network Romania 2024	Jun 13, 2024	Galați Ice Rink	Galați, Romania
7	GFC 7: Romania vs. Netherlands II	Jun 24, 2021	Silva Complex	Bucharest, Romania
6	GFC 6: Romania vs. Netherlands	November 29, 2019	Sala Constantin Jude	Timișoara, Romania
5	GFC 5: Romania vs. China II	August 24, 2018	Piațeta Cazino	Mamaia, Romania
4	GFC 4: Bulgaria vs. Romania	April 28, 2018	Varna Palace	Varna, Bulgaria
3	GFC 3: Romania vs. Suriname	October 20, 2017	Centrul Multifuncțional	Craiova, Romania
2	GFC 2: Romania vs. China	June 16, 2017	Sala Constantin Jude	Timișoara, Romania
1	GFC 1: Muay Thai	September 25, 2015	Centrul Regional de Afaceri	Timișoara, Romania

== Notable fighters ==
- (Romania) Ștefan Orza
- (Romania) Andrei Stoica
- (Romania) Bogdan Stoica
- (Romania) Amansio Paraschiv
- (Romania) Cristian Spetcu
- (Romania) Adrian Maxim
- (Romania) Gabriel Bozan
- (Romania) Ionuț Iancu
- (Romania) Ionuț Popa
- (Romania) Adrian Mitu
- (Romania) Cristian Milea
- (Moldova) Petru Morari
- (Netherlands) Michael Boapeah
- (Netherlands) Christian Baya
- (Netherlands) Jan Kaffa
- (Netherlands) Muhammed Balli
- (Bulgaria) Eduard Aleksanyan
- (China) Jin Ying

== See also ==
- Dynamite Fighting Show
- Colosseum Tournament
- OSS Fighters
