= Galați Ice Rink =

Ice rink in Galaţi, Romania

Coordinates: 45°27′17″N 28°02′00″E

Galați Skating Rink
- Interactive map of Galați Skating Rink
- Location: Galaţi, Romania
- Capacity: Kickboxing: 12,000; Ice hockey: 5,100

Construction
- Opened: 1968

Tenant
- CSM Dunărea Galați

The Galați Ice Rink (Romanian: Patinoarul Galați) is a multi-purpose hall in Galaţi, Romania. It is frequently used for concerts, indoor sports such as ice hockey, exhibitions and shows. The hall has a seating capacity of 3,500 people. It is home to the CSM Dunărea Galaţi ice hockey team. In 2023, it was announced that the ice rink will be modernized and has 5,100 seats.
