= 2020 in Romanian kickboxing =

Information
- First date: February 7, 2020
- Last date: December 18, 2020

The 2020 season was the 18th season of competitive kickboxing in Romania. Because of the COVID-19 pandemic in Romania, the promotions went on hiatus. They resumed holding events after the middle of the year.

== List of events ==
#	Event title	Date	Arena	Location
1	OSS Fighters 05	February 7, 2020	Sala Polivalentă	Bucharest, Romania
2	KO Masters 7	February 10, 2020	Berăria H	Bucharest, Romania
3	Dynamite Fighting Show 7	March 5, 2020	Sala Polivalentă	Arad, Romania
4	Dynamite Fighting Show 8	August 20, 2020	Arenele Romane	Bucharest, Romania
5	Colosseum Tournament 19	September 25, 2020	Undisclosed Studio	Debrecen, Hungary
6	Colosseum Tournament 20	October 23, 2020	Sala Polivalentă	Arad, Romania
7	Colosseum Tournament 21	November 27, 2020	Colosseum Tournament Studios	Bucharest, Romania
8	Dynamite Fighting Show 9: Stoica vs. Voronin III	December 4, 2020	Horia Demian Arena	Cluj-Napoca, Romania
9	KO Masters 8	December 16, 2020	Undisclosed Studio	Bucharest, Romania
10	Colosseum Tournament 22: Ostrovanu vs. Căliniuc	December 18, 2020	Colosseum Tournament Studios	Bucharest, Romania

== OSS Fighters 05 ==
OSS Fighters 05
- Promotion: OSS Fighters
- Date: February 7, 2020
- Venue: Sala Polivalentă
- City: Bucharest, Romania

Event chronology
Fight Zone 6	OSS Fighters 05	KO Masters 7

OSS Fighters 05 was a kickboxing event produced by the OSS Fighters that took place on February 7, 2020, at the Sala Polivalentă in Bucharest, Romania.

=== Results ===
OSS Fighters 05 (Sport Extra)
Weight Class				Method	Round	Time	Notes
Heavyweight	(Netherlands) Fabio Kwasi	def.	(Romania) Cristian Ristea	TKO (referee stoppage)	3	1:33	Heavyweight Tournament Final
Super Lightweight	(Romania) Amansio Paraschiv	def.	(Denmark) Mohamed El-Mir	Decision (unanimous)	3	3:00	
Middleweight	(Romania) Claudiu Alexe	def.	(Greece) Petros Vardakas	Decision (unanimous)	3	3:00	
Heavyweight	(Netherlands) Fabio Kwasi	def.	(Suriname) Clyde Brunswijk	Decision	3	3:00	Heavyweight Tournament Semi-Finals
Heavyweight	(Romania) Cristian Ristea	def.	(Italy) Marco Pisu	Decision (unanimous)	3	3:00	Heavyweight Tournament Semi-Finals
Featherweight	(Morocco) Said Malek	def.	(Romania) Adrian Maxim	Decision (split)	3	3:00	
Lightweight	(Romania) Ștefan Orza	def.	(Moldova) Serghei Zanosiev	Decision (unanimous)	3	3:00	
Heavyweight	(Netherlands) Fabio Kwasi	def.	(Turkey) Buğra Erdoğan	Decision (unanimous)	3	3:00	Heavyweight Tournament Quarter-Finals
Heavyweight	(Suriname) Clyde Brunswijk	def.	(Italy) Marco Pisu	Decision (unanimous)	3	3:00	Heavyweight Tournament Quarter-Finals
Heavyweight	(Greece) Giannis Stoforidis	def.	(Bosnia and Herzegovina) Enver Šljivar	TKO (referee stoppage)	3	1:02	Heavyweight Tournament Quarter-Finals
Heavyweight	(Romania) Cristian Ristea	def.	(Austria) Thomas Froschauer	KO (right hook)	2	0:32	Heavyweight Tournament Quarter-Finals
Heavyweight	(Romania) Alexandru Radnev	def.	(Serbia) Milan Dašić	KO (right hook)	2	1:34	

== KO Masters 7 ==
KO Masters 7
- Promotion: KO Masters
- Date: February 10, 2020
- Venue: Berăria H
- City: Bucharest, Romania

Event chronology
OSS Fighters 05	KO Masters 7	Dynamite Fighting Show 7

KO Masters 7 was a kickboxing event produced by the KO Masters that took place on February 10, 2020, at the Berăria H in Bucharest, Romania.

=== Results ===
KO Masters 7 (Fight Network)
Weight Class				Method
Super Middleweight	(United States) Andrew Tate	def.	(Serbia) Miralem Ahmeti	KO (left high kick)
Super Welterweight	(Romania) Cristian Măniţă	def.	(Romania) Adrian Vodă	KO (right hook)
Light Heavyweight	(Netherlands) Max van Gelder	def.	(Serbia) Antonio Zovak	KO (liver kick)
Welterweight	(Romania) Mirel Drăgan	def.	(Serbia) Vanja Dumitrov	KO (liver kick)
Heavyweight	(Romania) Ion Grigore	def.	(Serbia) Aleksandar Aleksić	KO (overhand right)
Middleweight	(Romania) Alexandru Ianculescu	def.	(Romania) Alexandru Vasiloanca	KO (right hook)
Super Welterweight	(Romania) Nicolai Buceac	def.	(Romania) Paul Cucerzan	TKO (referee stoppage)
Welterweight	(Romania) Florin Pîrtea	def.	(Romania) Ștefan Aștefănoaiei	TKO (referee stoppage)
Super Lightweight	(Romania) Robert Țiprigan	def.	(Romania) Marvin Belecciu	TKO (towel thrown)
Flyweight	(Romania) Robert Hu Hua Long	def.	(Romania) Victor Alexandru	KO (spinning heel kick)
Super Welterweight	(Romania) Răzvan Măcioi	def.	(Romania) Cătălin Lefter	TKO (referee stoppage)

== Dynamite Fighting Show 7 ==
Dynamite Fighting Show 7
- Promotion: Dynamite Fighting Show
- Date: March 5, 2020
- Venue: Sala Polivalentă
- City: Arad, Romania
- Attendance: 2,150

Event chronology
KO Masters 7	Dynamite Fighting Show 7	Dynamite Fighting Show 8

Dynamite Fighting Show 7 (also known as David vs. Goliath 2) was a combat sport event produced by the Dynamite Fighting Show that took place on March 5, 2020, at the Sala Polivalentă in Arad, Romania. The event was sold out.

=== Results ===
Dynamite Fighting Show 7 (Sport Extra)
Weight Class				Method	Round	Time	Notes
Openweight (MMA)	(Romania) Anatoli Ciumac	def.	(Romania) Florin Lambagiu	Decision (split)	3	5:00	
Super Welterweight	(Romania) Eduard Gafencu	def.	(Belgium) Benjamin Masudi	Decision (unanimous)	3	3:00	
Heavyweight	(Romania) Marius Munteanu	def.	(Morocco) Mohamed Seddik	Decision (unanimous)	3	3:00	
Lightweight	(Romania) Daniel Corbeanu	def.	(Uzbekistan) Zahid Zairov	Decision (split)	3	3:00	
Heavyweight	(Romania) Ștefan Lătescu	def.	(Romania) Eugen Mailat	TKO (referee stoppage)	1	1:36	
Super Welterweight	(Romania) Bogdan Năstase	def.	(Hungary) Gábor Meszlényi	Decision (unanimous)	3	3:00	
Welterweight (MMA)	(Romania) Corneliu Lascăr	def.	(Romania) Lukas Maxa	KO (punches)	3	0:37	
Heavyweight	(Romania) Ionuț Iancu	def.	(Romania) Florin Ivănoaie	KO (right hook)	4	2:29	
Heavyweight	(Romania) Mihai Cîrstea	def.	(Romania) Costin Mincu	Decision (unanimous)	3	3:00	

=== Awards ===
- Fight of the Night: Eduard Gafencu vs. Benjamin Masudi

== Dynamite Fighting Show 8 ==
Dynamite Fighting Show 8
- Promotion: Dynamite Fighting Show
- Date: August 20, 2020
- Venue: Arenele Romane
- City: Bucharest, Romania
- Attendance: None (behind closed doors)

Event chronology
Dynamite Fighting Show 8	Dynamite Fighting Show 8	Colosseum Tournament 19

Dynamite Fighting Show 8 (also known as Capital Fight) was a combat sport event produced by the Dynamite Fighting Show that took place on August 20, 2020, at the Arenele Romane in Bucharest, Romania.

=== Results ===
Dynamite Fighting Show 8 (Sport Extra)
Weight Class				Method	Round	Time	Notes
Heavyweight	(Romania) Ionuț Iancu	def.	(Romania) Sebastian Lutaniuc	Decision (unanimous)	3	2:00	Heavyweight Tournament Final. For the Dynamite Fighting Show Heavyweight Championship
Super Welterweight (Boxing)	(Romania) Flavius Biea	def.	(United Kingdom) Teodor Nikolov	TKO (retirement)	4	3:00	Co-Main Event
Heavyweight	(Romania) Ionuț Iancu	def.	(Romania) Ion Grigore	TKO (referee stoppage)	3	1:47	Heavyweight Tournament Semi-Finals
Heavyweight	(Romania) Sebastian Lutaniuc	def.	(Romania) Florin Ivănoaie	Decision (majority)	3	2:00	Heavyweight Tournament Semi-Finals
Lightweight	(Romania) Călin Petrișor	def.	(Romania) Daniel Corbeanu	TKO (corner stoppage/towel thrown)	3	0:54	
Heavyweight	(Romania) Ion Grigore	def.	(Romania) Costin Mincu	Decision (unanimous)	3	2:00	Heavyweight Tournament Quarter-Finals
Heavyweight	(Romania) Ionuț Iancu	def.	(Romania) Ștefan Lătescu	Decision (split)	3	2:00	Heavyweight Tournament Quarter-Finals
Heavyweight	(Romania) Sebastian Lutaniuc	def.	(Romania) Mihai Ștefan	Decision (unanimous)	3	2:00	Heavyweight Tournament Quarter-Finals
Heavyweight	(Romania) Florin Ivănoaie	def.	(Romania) Marius Munteanu	Decision (split)	3	2:00	Heavyweight Tournament Quarter-Finals
Heavyweight	(Romania) Andrei Petrerașu	def.	(Romania) Robert Hodea	TKO (doctor stoppage/cut)	2	0:17	Heavyweight Tournament Reserve

=== Awards ===
- Fight of the Night: Ionuț Iancu vs. Ștefan Lătescu

== Colosseum Tournament 19 ==
Colosseum Tournament 19
- Promotion: Colosseum Tournament
- Date: September 25, 2020
- Venue: Undisclosed Studio
- City: Debrecen, Hungary
- Attendance: None (behind closed doors)

Event chronology
Dynamite Fighting Show	Colosseum Tournament 19	Colosseum Tournament 20

Colosseum Tournament 19 was a kickboxing event produced by the Colosseum Tournament that took place on September 25, 2020, in Debrecen, Hungary.

=== Results ===
Main card (FightBox)
Weight class				Method	Round	Time	Notes
Heavyweight	(Romania) Alexandru Lungu	def.	(Hungary) Tamás Hajdu	TKO (referee stoppage)	1	1:43
Featherweight	(Romania) Marian Lăpușneanu	def.	(Romania) Adrian Maxim	Decision (unanimous)	4	3:00
Welterweight	(Romania) Flavius Boiciuc	def.	(Romania) Raul Boștan	TKO (referee stoppage)	2	0:56
Bantamweight	(Romania) Iulian Marinescu	def.	(Romania) Ruben Onișor	TKO (referee stoppage)	1	0:54
Lightweight	(Romania) Octavian Jurj	def.	(Romania) Alexandru Petruț	Decision (unanimous)	4	3:00
Openweight (110 kg)	(Romania) Gabriel Conea	def.	(Romania) Alexandru Tironeac	KO (punches and knee)	1	2:12

== Colosseum Tournament 20 ==
Colosseum Tournament 20
- Promotion: Colosseum Tournament
- Date: October 23, 2020
- Venue: Sala Polivalentă
- City: Arad, Romania
- Attendance: None (behind closed doors)

Event chronology
Colosseum Tournament 19	Colosseum Tournament 20	Colosseum Tournament 21

Colosseum Tournament 20 (also known as Dey Grand Prix) was a kickboxing event produced by the Colosseum Tournament that took place on October 23, 2020, at the Sala Polivalentă in Arad, Romania.

=== Results ===
Main card (FightBox)
Weight class				Method	Round	Time	Notes
Super Lightweight	(Romania) Andrei Ostrovanu	def.	(Romania) Flavius Boiciuc	Decision (unanimous)	3	3:00
Openweight (81 kg)	(Romania) Eduard Gafencu	def.	(Romania) Alexandru Ianţoc	KO (jumping knee)	2	2:25
Light Heavyweight	(Romania) Sebastian Cozmâncă	def.	(France) Anthony Burger	TKO (corner stoppage)	1	1:40
Lightweight	(Romania) Gabriel Bozan	def.	(Romania) Daniel Bolfă	Decision (unanimous)	3	3:00
Featherweight	(Romania) Silviu Ionescu	def.	(Romania) Ciprian Mureșan	KO (body kick)	1	2:20
Heavyweight	(Romania) Alexandru Tironeac	def.	(Romania) Alexandru Manolache	Decision (unanimous)	3	3:00
Bantamweight	(Romania) Ruben Onișor	def.	(Romania) Paul Tolaș	Decision (unanimous)	3	3:00

== Colosseum Tournament 21 ==
Colosseum Tournament 21
- Promotion: Colosseum Tournament
- Date: November 27, 2020
- Venue: Colosseum Tournament Studios
- City: Bucharest, Romania
- Attendance: None (behind closed doors)

Event chronology
Colosseum Tournament 20	Colosseum Tournament 21	Dynamite Fighting Show 9: Stoica vs. Voronin III

Colosseum Tournament 21 (also known as Young Lions) was a kickboxing event produced by the Colosseum Tournament that took place on November 27, 2020, at Colosseum Tournament Studios in Bucharest, Romania.

=== Results ===
Main card (FightBox)
Weight class				Method	Round	Time	Notes
Featherweight	(Romania) Vlad Trif	def.	(Romania) Marian Lăpușneanu	Decision (split)	3	3:00	(Note: For the interim Colosseum Tournament World Featherweight Championship.)
Welterweight	(Romania) Mirel Drăgan	def.	(Romania) Mihai Drăgan	Decision (unanimous)	3	3:00
Middleweight	(Romania) Vasile Amariței	def.	(Romania) Damian Zaharia	Decision (split)	4	3:00
Bantamweight	(Romania) Ciprian Sofian	def.	(Romania) Iulian Marinescu	KO (right hook)	1	0:51
Heavyweight	(Romania) Marian Rusu	def.	(Moldova) Sergiu Gureu	TKO (doctor stoppage)	1	0:38
Lightweight	(Romania) Alexandru Ciucureanu	def.	(Romania) David Constantin	TKO (towel thrown)	1	2:49
Bantamweight	(Romania) Adin Panaite	def.	(Romania) Daniel Handrea	Decision (unanimous)	3	3:00
Lightweight	(Romania) Constantin Holdur	def.	(Romania) Alexandru Iancu	TKO (doctor stoppage)	3	1:34

== Dynamite Fighting Show 9 ==
Dynamite Fighting Show 9
- Promotion: Dynamite Fighting Show
- Date: December 4, 2020
- Venue: Horia Demian Arena
- City: Cluj-Napoca, Romania
- Attendance: None (behind closed doors)

Event chronology
Colosseum Tournament 21	Dynamite Fighting Show 9	KO Masters 8

Dynamite Fighting Show 9: Stoica vs. Voronin III (also known as Day of Revenge) was a kickboxing event produced by the Dynamite Fighting Show that took place on December 4, 2020, at Horia Demian Arena in Cluj-Napoca, Romania.

=== Results ===
Main card (Sport Extra)
Weight class				Method	Round	Time	Notes
Light Heavyweight	(Romania) Andrei Stoica	def.	(Moldova) Pavel Voronin	Decision (split)	3	3:00
Heavyweight	(Romania) Ștefan Lătescu	def.	(Romania) Florin Ivănoaie	Decision (unanimous)	3	3:00
Heavyweight	(Romania) Marius Munteanu	def.	(Romania) Ionuț Iancu	Decision (split)	4	3:00
Openweight	(Romania) Bogdan Năstase	def.	(Romania) Eugen Mailat	KO (jumping knee)	2	1:17
Women's Flyweight	(Romania) Andreea Cebuc	def.	(Moldova) Donna Cheli	Decision (unanimous)	3	3:00
Lightweight	(Romania) Călin Petrișor	def.	(Romania) Daniel Corbeanu	TKO (three knockdown rule)	3	2:02
Super Lightweight	(Romania) Cezar Buzdugan	def.	(Romania) Luca Luncașu	TKO (three knockdown rule)	2	2:24

^{1} The co-main event between Florin Lambagiu and Ion Grigore was canceled after at least one of the fighters tested positive for COVID-19.

=== Awards ===
- Fight of the Night: Andrei Stoica vs. Pavel Voronin

== KO Masters 8 ==
KO Masters 8
- Promotion: KO Masters
- Date: December 16, 2020
- Venue: Undisclosed Studio
- City: Bucharest, Romania
- Attendance: None (behind closed doors)

Event chronology
Dynamite Fighting Show 9	KO Masters 8	Colosseum Tournament 22: Ostrovanu vs. Căliniuc

KO Masters 8 was a kickboxing event produced by the KO Masters that took place on December 16, 2020, in Bucharest, Romania.

=== Results ===
Main card (FightBox)
Weight class				Method	Round	Time	Notes
Light Heavyweight	(United Kingdom) Andrew Tate	def.	(Romania) Cosmin Lingurar	TKO (retirement)	2	2:02
Middleweight	(Moldova) Ion Surdu	def.	(Hungary) Viktor Varga	TKO (referee stoppage)	1	0:20
Women's Flyweight	(Romania) Andreea Cebuc	def.	(Romania) Petruţa Nicula	KO (punches)	1	2:19
Super Middleweight	(Romania) Claudiu Alexe	def.	(Romania) Ștefan Emeldi	KO (head kick)	1	0:04
Featherweight	(Romania) Ionel Bălan	def.	(Romania) Amir Anton	KO (punch)	1	2:13
Middleweight	(Romania) Răzvan Macioi	def.	(Romania) Costel Rășcanu	KO (punches and kicks)	1	1:00
Welterweight	(Romania) Narcius Răduţ	def.	(Romania) Florin Adar	TKO (retirement)	2	3:00

== Colosseum Tournament 22 ==
Colosseum Tournament 22
- Promotion: Colosseum Tournament
- Date: December 18, 2020
- Venue: Colosseum Tournament Studios
- City: Bucharest, Romania
- Attendance: None (behind closed doors)

Event chronology
KO Masters 8	Colosseum Tournament 22	Colosseum Tournament 23: Căliniuc vs. Bozan

Colosseum Tournament 22: Ostrovanu vs. Căliniuc (also known as Clash of Heroes) was a kickboxing event produced by the Colosseum Tournament that took place on December 18, 2020, at Colosseum Tournament Studios in Bucharest, Romania.

=== Results ===
Main card (FightBox)
Weight class				Method	Round	Time	Notes
Super Lightweight	(Romania) Sorin Căliniuc	def.	(Romania) Andrei Ostrovanu	Decision (unanimous)	3	3:00	(Note: For the inaugural Colosseum Tournament World Super Lightweight Championship.)
Lightweight	(Romania) Gabriel Bozan	def.	(Moldova) Maxim Răilean	Decision (unanimous)	3	3:00
Bantamweight	(Romania) Ciprian Sofian	def.	(Romania) Adin Panaite	Decision (unanimous)	4	3:00	(Note: For the inaugural Colosseum Tournament World Bantamweight Championship.)
Featherweight	(Romania) Adrian Maxim	def.	(Romania) Silviu Ionescu	Decision (unanimous)	3	3:00
Featherweight	(Romania) Marian Lăpușneanu	def.	(Romania) Cosmin Grosu	Decision (unanimous)	3	3:00
Light Welterweight	(Romania) Anghel Cardoș	def.	(Romania) Darius Argyo	Decision (unanimous)	3	3:00
Middleweight	(Romania) Cătălin Graure	def.	(Romania) Alexandru Amariței	Decision (unanimous)	3	3:00
Lightweight	(Romania) Adrian Baciu	def.	(Romania) Ciprian Mureșan	KO (jumping knee)	1	2:14
Lightweight	(Romania) Ciprian Ivan	def.	(Romania) Octavian Jurj	Decision (unanimous)	3	3:00
Middleweight	(Romania) Ionuț Busuioc	vs.	(Romania) Dan Tudoran	NC (accidental groin kick)	2	1:34
Bantamweight	(Romania) Daniel Handrea	def.	(Romania) Ionuț Ilie	Decision (unanimous)	3	3:00

== See also ==
- 2020 in Glory
- 2020 in ONE Championship
- 2020 in RXF
