= Andreea Cebuc =

Romanian kickboxer and wushu practitioner

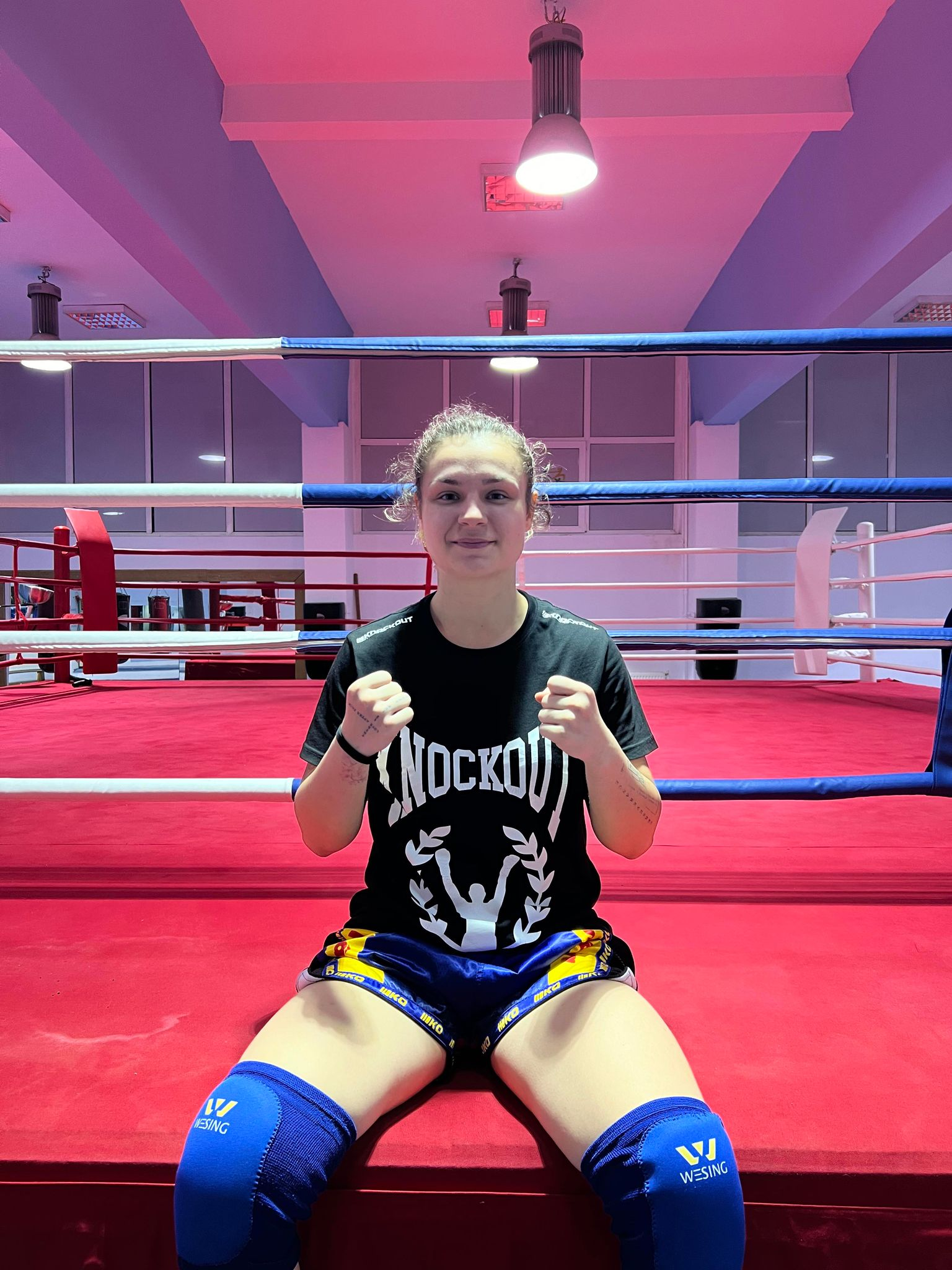
- Born: Andreea Alexandra Cebuc; July 30, 2002 (age 24); Bucharest, Romania
- Other names: The One
- Height: 5 ft 5 in (1.65 m)
- Weight: 135 lb (61 kg; 9.6 st)
- Division: Bantamweight
- Style: Wushu
- Fighting out of: Bucharest, Romania
- Team: Superkombat Academy
- Trainer: Cezar Gheorghe, Marian Cebuc
- Years active: 2017–present

Kickboxing record
- Total: 24
- Wins: 22
- By knockout: 5
- Losses: 2
- By knockout: 0
- Draws: 0

Other information
- University: UNEFS
- Last updated on: November 16, 2025

Andreea Alexandra Cebuc (born July 30, 2002) is a Romanian professional kickboxer and wushu practitioner. As of 1 December 2025, Cebuc is ranked the #1 openweight female kickboxer in the world.

As a wushu practitioner, she is a 2023 World Championships gold medalist, as well as a five-time European Championships gold medalist.

== Championships and awards ==
=== Kickboxing ===
- World Association of Kickboxing Organizations
  - 2025 WAKO World Championships -65 kg/143 lb K1 Bronze Medalist (bronze)
  - 2021 WAKO World Championships -60 kg/132 lb K1 Bronze Medalist (bronze)
  - 2021 WAKO World Cup -60 kg/132 lb K1 Silver Medalist (silver)
  - 2023 WAKO World Cup -65 kg/143 lb K1 Bronze Medalist (bronze)
  - 2025 WAKO European Cup -65 kg/143 lb K1 Gold Medalist (gold)
- Kickboxing Romania Awards
  - 2025 Female Kickboxer of the Year
  - 2024 Female Kickboxer of the Year
  - 2023 Female Kickboxer of the Year

=== Wushu ===
- International Wushu Federation
  - 2023 IWUF World Championships -65 kg/143 lb Sanda Gold Medalist (gold)
  - 2025 IWUF European Championships -60 kg/132 lb Sanda Gold Medalist (gold)
  - 2024 IWUF European Championships -65 kg/143 lb Sanda Gold Medalist (gold)
  - 2023 IWUF European Championships -65 kg/143 lb Sanda Gold Medalist (gold)
  - 2022 IWUF European Championships -60 kg/132 lb Sanda Gold Medalist (gold)
  - 2022 IWUF European Championships -60 kg/132 lb Qingda Gold Medalist (gold)

== Personal life ==
Cebuc has idolised Ronda Rousey from childhood. She passed the Romanian Baccalaureate with a grade of 9,03.

== Professional record ==
Professional Kickboxing record
22 wins (5 KOs), 2 losses (0 KOs), 0 draws
Date	Result	Opponent	Event	Location	Method	Round	Time	Record
2025-11-15	Win	(Turkey) Nezaket İrem İhtiyar	Sanda Pro Fight	Burgas, Bulgaria	Decision (unanimous)	3	3:00	22-2-0
2025-03-07	Win	(Romania) Maria Nițescu	Dynamite Fighting Show 26	Râmnicu Vâlcea, Romania	Decision (unanimous)	3	3:00	21–2–0
2024-06-13	Win	(Italy) Marta Costa	K-1 Fighting Network Romania 2024	Galați, Romania	Decision (unanimous)	3	3:00	20-2-0
2023-10-21	Win	(Italy) Chiara Vincis	MO Fighting Show 1	Turin, Italy	Ext.R Decision	4	3:00	19–2–0
2023-09-22	Win	(Romania) Denisa Vulpe	Dynamite Fighting Show 20	Bucharest, Romania	Decision (unanimous)	3	3:00	18-2-0
2023-05-13	Loss	(Netherlands) Sarel de Jong	Enfusion 122	Wuppertal, Germany	Decision (unanimous)	3	3:00	17-2-0
2023-04-08	Win	(Moldova) Nelea Băț	Legendele Moldovei	Iași, Romania	TKO (towel thrown)	1	1:58	17–1–0
2022-06-20	Win	(Romania) Ana Maria Pal	KO Masters 10	Bucharest, Romania	TKO (referee stoppage)	2	2:46	16-1-0
2021-08-17	Win	(Romania) Monica Bălăşoiu	KO Masters 9	Bucharest, Romania	Decision (unanimous)	3	3:00	15–1–0
2020-12-16	Win	(Romania) Petruţa Necula	KO Masters 8	Bucharest, Romania	TKO (punches)	1	2:19	14-1-0
2020-12-04	Win	(Moldova) Donna Cheli	Dynamite Fighting Show 9	Cluj-Napoca, Romania	Decision (unanimous)	3	3:00	13–1–0
2019-11-25	Win	(Romania) Dalia Ciocan	KO Masters 6	Bucharest, Romania	Decision (unanimous)	3	3:00	12-1-0
2019-10-31	Win	(Romania) Flori Constantin	KO Masters 5	Bucharest, Romania	Decision (unanimous)	3	3:00	11–1–0
2019-09-16	Win	(Romania) Karina Helciug	KO Masters 4	Bucharest, Romania	TKO (left hook)	2	2:45	10-1-0
2019-06-03	Win	(Romania) Valentina Popescu	KO Masters 3	Bucharest, Romania	Decision (unanimous)	3	3:00	9–1–0
2019-03-19	Win	(Romania) Daniela Nică	KO Masters 2	Bucharest, Romania	TKO (left hook)	2	1:24	8-1-0
2018-12-10	Win	(Romania) Cristina Brâncoveanu	KO Masters 1	Bucharest, Romania	Decision (unanimous)	3	3:00	7–1–0
Legend: Win Loss Draw/No contest Notes

== See also ==
- List of female kickboxers
