= 2025 in Romanian kickboxing =

Information
- First date: March 7, 2025

The 2025 season is the 23rd season of competitive kickboxing in Romania.

== List of events ==
#	Event Title	Date	Arena	Location
1	Dynamite Fighting Show 26	March 7, 2025	Traian Arena	Râmnicu Vâlcea, Romania
2	Colosseum Tournament 45	April 4, 2025	Hilton on Park Lane	London, England
3	Road to DFS 6	May 30, 2025	Horia Demian Arena	Cluj-Napoca, Romania
4	Dynamite Fighting Show 27	June 8, 2025	Lascăr Pană Arena	Baia Mare, Romania
5	Road to DFS 7	June 27, 2025	Târgoviște Arena	Târgoviște, Romania
6	Colosseum Tournament 46	July 2, 2025	Suceava Fortress	Suceava, Romania
7	Road to DFS 8	August 2, 2025	TeraPlast Arena	Bistrița, Romania
8	Colosseum Tournament 47	September 19, 2025	Dumitru Popescu-Colibași Arena	Brașov, Romania
9	EFC 1	October 17, 2025	Constanța Arena	Constanța, Romania
10	Dynamite Fighting Show 28	October 24, 2025	Pitești Arena	Pitești, Romania
11	Colosseum Tournament 48	December 12, 2025	Olimpia Arena	Ploiești, Romania
12	Dynamite Fighting Show 29	December 12, 2025	Constantin Jude Arena	Timișoara, Romania

== Dynamite Fighting Show 26 ==
Dynamite Fighting Show 26
- Promotion: Dynamite Fighting Show
- Date: March 7, 2025
- Venue: Traian Arena
- City: Râmnicu Vâlcea, Romania
- Attendance: 3,000

Dynamite Fighting Show 26: Vengeance Day was a kickboxing and boxing event produced by the Dynamite Fighting Show that took place on March 7, 2025 at the Traian Arena in Râmnicu Vâlcea, Romania.

Remy Bonjasky made special guest appearance at the event.

=== Results ===
Main card (Dynamitefighting.com PPV)
Weight class				Method	Round	Time	Notes
Heavyweight	(Cape Verde) Iuri Fernandes	def.	(Romania) Bogdan Stoica	Decision (split)	3	3:00
Openweight	(Romania) Florin Lambagiu	def.	(Romania) Anatoli Ciumac	Decision (split)	3	3:00
Super Featherweight	(Romania) Valentin Mavrodin	def.	(Portugal) Vinicius Bereta	Decision (unanimous)	3	3:00
Openweight	(Romania) Bogdan Năstase	def.	(Hungary) Tibor Varga	Decision (unanimous)	3	3:00
Openweight	(Brazil) Rodrigo Mineiro	def.	(Romania) Bogdan Beștea	TKO (referee stoppage)	2	1:37
Women's Bantamweight	(Romania) Andreea Cebuc	def.	(Romania) Maria Nițescu	Decision (unanimous)	3	3:00
Lightweight	(Romania) Andrei Varga	def.	(Romania) Denis Ceaușu	Decision (unanimous)	3	3:00	(Note: Deduction from Denis Ceaușu for exceeding the weight limit)
Featherweight	(Romania) Bogdan Floriștean	def.	(Romania) Ionel Bălan	Decision (unanimous)	3	3:00

== Colosseum Tournament 45 ==
Colosseum Tournament 45
- Promotion: Colosseum Tournament
- Date: April 4, 2025
- Venue: Hilton on Park Lane
- City: London, England

Colosseum Tournament 45: Night of Champions was a kickboxing event produced by the Colosseum Tournament that took place on April 4, 2025, at the Hilton on Park Lane in London, England.

=== Results ===
Main card (Colosseum Kickboxing Live App PPV/TrillerTV PPV)
Weight class				Method	Round	Time	Notes
Welterweight	(Armenia) Harut Grigorian	def.	(Romania) Alex Amariței	Decision (unanimous)	5	3:00	(Note: For the vacant Colosseum Tournament World Welterweight Championship.)
Bantamweight	(Romania) Daniel Dragomir	def.	(Netherlands) Matthew Daalman	Decision (unanimous)	3	3:00
Heavyweight	(Romania) Marian Rusu	def.	(Greece) Michail Karamousketas	KO (liver shot)	1	0:55	(Note: Marian Rusu's Retirement Fight)
Featherweight	(Romania) Bogdan Floriștean	def.	(Brazil) Osman Vacoev	TKO (three knockdowns)	1	1:11
Light Heavyweight	(Netherlands) Victor De Koning	def.	(Morocco) Nabil Balikane	KO (head kick)	2	1:32	(Note: For the inaugural Colosseum Tournament New Heroes Light Heavyweight Championship.)
Light Heavyweight	(Romania) Cosmin Ionescu	def.	(Morocco) Tarik Cherkaoui	TKO (three knockdowns)	1	2:58
Middleweight	(Greece) Valentinos Wolf Kyriakidis	def.	(Romania) Răzvan Radu	Ext. R Decision (unanimous)	4	3:00
Welterweight	(Romania) Alex Panțîru	def.	(Romania) Gabriel Grădinaru	TKO (referee stoppage)	1	2:10
Welterweight	(United Kingdom) Micah Smith	vs.	(Romania) David Alesu	Draw	3	3:00
Women's Super Featherweight	(Nigeria) Rachel John	def.	(Netherlands) Saar van den Broek	Decision (unanimous)	5	2:00	(Note: For the inaugural Colosseum Tournament New Heroes Women's Super Featherweight Championship.)
Light Heavyweight	(Iran) Hamid Reza Kordabadi	def.	(Sweden) Jacob Wandrell	KO (knee to the body)	3	0:21

== Road to DFS 6 ==
Road to DFS 6
- Promotion: Dynamite Fighting Show; Ultimate Fighting Tournament
- Date: May 30, 2025
- Venue: Horia Demian Arena
- City: Cluj-Napoca, Romania
- Attendance: 1,200

Road to DFS 6 was a kickboxing, Muay Thai and mixed martial arts event produced by the Dynamite Fighting Show that took place on May 30, 2025 at the Horia Demian Arena in Cluj-Napoca, Romania.

=== Results ===
Main card (Pro Arena)
Weight class				Method	Round	Time	Notes
Cruiserweight	(Romania) Sebastian Lutaniuc	def.	(Poland) Szymon Sołtys	Decision (unanimous)	3	3:00
Super Featherweight	(Romania) Adrian Maxim	def.	(Brazil) Daniel de Oliveira	Decision (unanimous)	3	3:00
Super Featherweight	(Romania) Vlad Trif	def.	(Romania) Marius Cimpoieru	TKO (punch)	1	1:15
Lightweight	(Romania) Mario Olariu	def.	(Romania) Roberto Varga	TKO (doctor stoppage)	1	3:00
Heavyweight	(Romania) Vasile Corcodel	def.	(Romania) Levente Kovács	Decision (unanimous)	3	3:00
Bantamweight	(Romania) Marian Lupașcu	def.	(Romania) Eduardo Maradin	Decision (split)	3	3:00
Super Welterweight	(Romania) Paul Danci	def.	(Romania) Alexandru Curcudel	KO (jumping knee)	1	2:58
Super Featherweight	(Romania) Teodor Șerban	def.	(Romania) Eduard Gochan	Decision (unanimous)	3	3:00

== Dynamite Fighting Show 27 ==
Dynamite Fighting Show 27
- Promotion: Dynamite Fighting Show
- Date: June 8, 2025
- Venue: Lascăr Pană Arena
- City: Baia Mare, Romania
- Attendance: 3,200

Dynamite Fighting Show 27 was a kickboxing and boxing event produced by the Dynamite Fighting Show that took place on June 8, 2024 at the Lascăr Pană Arena in Baia Mare, Romania.

Remy Bonjasky and Benjamin Adegbuyi made special guest appearances at the event.

=== Results ===
Main card (Dynamitefighting.com PPV)
Weight class				Method	Round	Time	Notes
Welterweight	(United States) Omar Moreno	def.	(Romania) Andrei Ostrovanu (c)	KO (punch)	4	1:49	(Note: For the ISKA Intercontinental Super Middleweight Championship.)
Heavyweight	(Romania) Bogdan Stoica	def.	(Hungary) Sándor Kertész	Decision (unanimous)	3	3:00
Welterweight	(Romania) Florin Lambagiu	def.	(Brazil) Rodrigo Mineiro	Ext. R Decision (unanimous)	4	3:00
Heavyweight	(Romania) Marius Munteanu	def.	(Romania) Ilie Brancu	KO (body knee)	1	2:08
Cruiserweight	(Brazil) Guilherme de Assis Cordeiro	def.	(Romania) Alex Negrea	TKO (arm injury)	1	1:02	(Note: Alex Negrea's Retirement Fight)
Welterweight	(Romania) Andrei Leuștean	def.	(Spain) Fernando Martín	Decision (unanimous)	3	3:00
Lightweight	(Romania) Andrei Varga	def.	(Hungary) Dominik Horváth	Decision (split)	3	3:00
Featherweight	(Romania) Ionuț Popa	def.	(Romania) Bogdan Floriștean	Decision (unanimous)	3	3:00

== Road to DFS 7 ==
Road to DFS 7
- Promotion: Dynamite Fighting Show; Clash of the Titans
- Date: June 27, 2025
- Venue: Târgoviște Arena
- City: Târgoviște, Romania
- Attendance: 2,000

Road to DFS 7 was a kickboxing, mixed martial arts and boxing event produced by the Dynamite Fighting Show that took place on June 27, 2025 at the Târgoviște Arena in Târgoviște, Romania.

=== Results ===
Main card (Pro Arena)
Weight class				Method	Round	Time	Notes
Lightweight	(Romania) Călin Petrișor	def.	(Belgium) Bilal Abdelouahab	Decision (unanimous)	3	3:00
Middleweight	(Turkey) Enes Bilben	def.	(Romania) Bogdan Năstase	Decision (split)	3	3:00
Cruiserweight	(Romania) Ionuț Busuioc	def.	(Turkey) Ali Sarı	Decision (unanimous)	3	3:00
Bantamweight	(Romania) Cosmin Brumă	def.	(Romania) Iulian Marinescu	Ext. R Decision (split)	4	3:00
Light Heavyweight	(Romania) Fery Alionte	def.	(Romania) Alexandru Oprea	Decision (split)	3	3:00
Lightweight	(Romania) Adrian Baciu	def.	(Romania) Răzvan Duță	Decision (unanimous)	3	3:00
Super Welterweight	(Romania) Aron Măcăilă	def.	(Romania) Alexandru Bortoş	Decision (unanimous)	3	3:00
Super Featherweight	(Romania) Emanuel Lupaşcu	def.	(Romania) Cristian Neacşu	Decision (split)	3	3:00

== Colosseum Tournament 46 ==
Colosseum Tournament 46
- Promotion: Colosseum Tournament
- Date: July 2, 2025
- Venue: Suceava Fortress
- City: Suceava, Romania
- Attendance: 3,500

Colosseum Tournament 46 was an outdoor kickboxing event produced by the Colosseum Tournament that took place on July 2, 2025, at the Suceava Fortress in Suceava, Romania.

Ernesto Hoost and Samuel Kwok made special guest appearances at the event.

=== Results ===
Main card (Colosseum Kickboxing Live App PPV/TrillerTV PPV)
Weight class				Method	Round	Time	Notes
Heavyweight	(Romania) Vasile Amariței	def.	(Romania) Cosmin Ionescu	Decision (unanimous)	3	3:00	(Note: Tournament Final to determine the Colosseum Tournament Interim World Heavyweight Champion.)
Light Welterweight	(Romania) Ștefan Orza	def.	(Georgia (country)) Levan Guruli	Decision (unanimous)	3	3:00
Lightweight	(Romania) Constantin Holdur	def.	(Romania) Marian Țepeș	Decision (unanimous)	3	3:00
Featherweight	(Romania) Andrei Sîrghi	def.	(Romania) Ionel Bălan	Decision (unanimous)	3	3:00
Cruiserweight	(Romania) Andrei Șerban	def.	(Belgium) Deyan Stanković	KO (punch)	1	1:06
Super Welterweight	(Romania) Raul Sîrb	def.	(Romania) Andrei Gherasie	Decision (unanimous)	3	3:00
Featherweight	(Romania) David Iordache	def.	(Romania) Gabriel Pădurean	Decision (unanimous)	3	3:00
Heavyweight	(Romania) Vasile Amariței	def.	(Morocco) Hamza Ourahou	KO (liver kick)	1	1:33	(Note: Colosseum Tournament Heavyweight Grand Prix Semifinal.)
Heavyweight	(Romania) Cosmin Ionescu	def.	(Serbia) Željko Zec	Decision (unanimous)	3	3:00	(Note: Colosseum Tournament Heavyweight Grand Prix Semifinal.)

== Road to DFS 8 ==
Road to DFS 8
- Promotion: Dynamite Fighting Show; Transilvania Mix Kombat
- Date: August 2, 2025
- Venue: TeraPlast Arena
- City: Bistrița, Romania
- Attendance: 2,500

Road to DFS 8 was a kickboxing event produced by the Dynamite Fighting Show that took place on August 2, 2025 at the TeraPlast Arena in Bistrița, Romania.

=== Results ===
Main card (Pro Arena)
Weight class				Method	Round	Time	Notes
Cruiserweight	(Romania) Sebastian Lutaniuc (c)	def.	(Brazil) Guilherme de Assis	Decision (unanimous)	5	3:00	(Note: For ISKA World Cruiserweight Championship)
Heavyweight	(Hungary) Tibor Varga	def.	(Romania) Marius Munteanu	DQ (illegal kick)	1	1:13
Super Featherweight	(Romania) Vlad Trif	def.	(Spain) Carlos García	Decision (unanimous)	3	3:00
Bantamweight	(Morocco) Zakaria Azizi	def.	(Romania) Mihai Rusu	KO (front kick)	1	2:42

== Colosseum Tournament 47 ==
Colosseum Tournament 47
- Promotion: Colosseum Tournament
- Date: September 19, 2025
- Venue: Dumitru Popescu-Colibași Arena
- City: Brașov, Romania

Colosseum Tournament 47 was a kickboxing event produced by the Colosseum Tournament that took place on September 19, 2025, at the Dumitru Popescu-Colibași Arena in Brașov, Romania.

Donovan Wisse made special guest appearance at the event.

=== Results ===
Main card (Colosseum Kickboxing Live App PPV/TrillerTV PPV)
Weight class				Method	Round	Time	Notes
Openweight	(Romania) Alexandru Popescu	def.	(Netherlands) Ismael Kewal	TKO (three knockdowns)	2	1:01
Super Welterweight	(Romania) Alex Burada	def.	(Turkey) Gökhan Çam	KO (right punch)	1	2:16
Bantamweight	(Romania) Sebastian Gal	def.	(Romania) Emanuel Vlad	Decision (split)	3	3:00
Featherweight	(Romania) Daniel Dragomir	def.	(Iran) Mohammad Haselmehri	KO (right punch)	2	1:37
Welterweight	(Romania) Paul Danci	def.	(Romania) Ovidiu Mereț	TKO (referee stoppage/arm injury)	1	2:59
Welterweight	(Romania) Alex Panțîru	def.	(Romania) Ciprian Mureșan	KO (right punch)	1	0:30
Cruiserweight	(Netherlands) Victor De Koning	def.	(Romania) Andrei Șerban	TKO (towel thrown)	2	1:37
Women's Strawweight	(Romania) Denisa Nicorici	def.	(Romania) Denisa Ungureanu	Decision (unanimous)	3	3:00
Heavyweight	(Romania) Ion Grigore	def.	(Romania) Dragoș Badea	Decision (unanimous)	3	3:00

== EFC 1 ==
EFC 1
- Promotion: Elite Fighting Championship
- Date: October 17, 2025
- Venue: Constanța Arena
- City: Constanța, Romania

EFC 1 is a kickboxing event produced by the Elite Fighting Championship that is scheduled to take place on October 17, 2025 at the Constanța Arena in Constanța, Romania.

=== Results ===
Main card (Sport Extra TV)
Weight class				Method	Round	Time	Notes
Light Welterweight	(Romania) Ștefan Orza	vs.	(Romania) Bogdan Slabu
Bantamweight	(Romania) Cosmin Brumă	vs.	(Romania) Alexandru Leahu
Bantamweight	(Romania) Eduardo Maradin	vs.	(Romania) Robert Colţea
Light Welterweight	(Romania) Ovidiu Mereţ	vs.	(Romania) Mădălin Crăciunică
Featherweight	(Romania) David Iordache	vs.	(Romania) Florin Mardiaș
Welterweight	(Romania) Ionuț Crivăț	vs.	(Romania) Sunni Mustafa
Super Featherweight	(Romania) Ștefan Vrânceanu	vs.	(Romania) David Dîrțu

== Dynamite Fighting Show 28 ==
Dynamite Fighting Show 28
- Promotion: Dynamite Fighting Show
- Date: October 24, 2025
- Venue: Pitești Arena
- City: Pitești, Romania
- Attendance: 4,900

Dynamite Fighting Show 28: Total Fight was a kickboxing event produced by the Dynamite Fighting Show that took place on October 24, 2025 at the Pitești Arena in Pitești, Romania.

Remy Bonjasky made special guest appearance at the event.

=== Results ===
Main card (Dynamitefighting.com PPV)
Weight class				Method	Round	Time	Notes
Light Heavyweight	(Romania) Ștefan Lătescu	def.	(Italy) Frank Kanaté	KO (right hook)	1	0:45
Welterweight	(Romania) Florin Lambagiu	def.	(Netherlands) Christian Baya	Decision (majority)	3	3:00
Lightweight	(Greece) Achilleas Karapiperis	def.	(Romania) Călin Petrișor	Decision (unanimous)	3	3:00
Cruiserweight	(Romania) Sebastian Lutaniuc	def.	(Romania) Mădălin Mogoș	TKO (three knockdowns)	1	2:41
Heavyweight	(Romania) Vasile Corcodel	def.	(Romania) Bogdan Beştea	Decision (unanimous)	3	3:00
Cruiserweight	(Romania) Gabriel Bodescu	def.	(Romania) Eric Bubuleandră	Decision (unanimous)	3	3:00
Super Welterweight	(Romania) Paul Danci	def.	(Romania) Alex Andreescu	Decision (unanimous)	3	3:00

== Colosseum Tournament 48 ==
Colosseum Tournament 48
- Promotion: Colosseum Tournament
- Date: December 12, 2025
- Venue: Olimpia Arena
- City: Ploiești, Romania
- Attendance: 3,200

Colosseum Tournament 48 was a kickboxing event produced by the Colosseum Tournament that took place on December 12, 2025, at the Olimpia Arena in Ploiești, Romania.

Khamzat Chimaev's coach Reza Madadi made special guest appearance at the event.

=== Results ===
Main card (Colosseum Kickboxing Live App PPV/TrillerTV PPV)
Weight class				Method	Round	Time	Notes
Welterweight	(Romania) Alex Panțîru	def.	(Armenia) Harut Grigorian (c)	KO (flurry of punches)	1	1:44	(Note: For the Colosseum Tournament World Welterweight Championship.)
Super Featherweight	(Romania) Daniel Dragomir	def.	(Romania) Dino Grigore	TKO (referee stoppage)	3	2:20
Super Lightweight	(Romania) Adrian Baciu	def.	(Moldova) Iulian Banari	KO (low kick)	2	1:50
Heavyweight	(Romania) Alin Nechita	def.	(Croatia) Amir Suljović	KO (left hooks)	1	0:56
Heavyweight	(Romania) Robert Damian	def.	(Hungary) Miklós Varga	TKO (doctor stoppage)	1	1:16
Featherweight	(Romania) Iulian Marinescu	def.	(Romania) Marian Țepeș	TKO (referee stoppage)	3	2:59

== Dynamite Fighting Show 29 ==
Dynamite Fighting Show 29
- Promotion: Dynamite Fighting Show
- Date: December 12, 2025
- Venue: Constantin Jude Arena
- City: Timișoara, Romania
- Attendance: 2,500

Dynamite Fighting Show 29 was a kickboxing and boxing event produced by the Dynamite Fighting Show that took place on December 12, 2025 at the Constantin Jude Arena in Timișoara, Romania.

=== Results ===
Main card (Dynamitefighting.com PPV)
Weight class				Method	Round	Time	Notes
Lightweight	(Romania) Călin Petrișor	def.	(Moldova) Vitalie Matei	Decision (unanimous)	3	3:00
Heavyweight	(Romania) Valentin Bordianu	def.	(Romania) Cristian Conea	Decision (split)	3	3:00
Welterweight	(Romania) Bogdan Takacs	def.	(Romania) Andrei Varga	Decision (split)	3	3:00
Heavyweight	(Romania) David Tăruși	vs.	(Romania) Ionuț Ciure	Draw	3	3;00
Featherweight	(Romania) Adrian Maxim	def.	(Romania) Ionel Bălan	Decision (unanimous)	3	3:00

== See also ==
- 2025 in Glory
- 2025 in ONE Championship
- 2025 in K-1
- 2025 in RISE
- 2025 in Wu Lin Feng
