= 2023 in Romanian kickboxing =

Information
- First date: January 28, 2023
- Last date: December 15, 2023

The 2023 season was the 21st season of competitive kickboxing in Romania.

== List of events ==
#	Event Title	Date	Arena	Location
1	Road to DFS 1	January 28, 2023	Palasport di Torino	Turin, Italy
2	Transilvania Mix Kombat	February 3, 2023	Bistrița Arena	Bistrița, Romania
—	OSS Fighters 09 (Cancelled)	March 12, 2023	Dubai Tennis Stadium	Dubai, United Arab Emirates
3	Dynamite Fighting Show 18	March 12, 2023	Constantin Jude Arena	Timișoara, Romania
4	Kombat London 1	March 17, 2023	Harrow Leisure Centre	London, England
5	Urban Legend 14: Urban Legend vs. Scorpions Iași	Apr 1, 2023	La Scoica Land	Mamaia, Constanța, Romania
6	Legendele Moldovei	Apr 8, 2023	Iași Arena	Iași, Romania
7	Colosseum Tournament 38	May 5, 2023	Dumitru Popescu-Colibași Arena	Brașov, Romania
8	Urban Legend 15: Urban Legend vs. Stoica Brothers Fight Academy	May 6, 2023	La Scoica Land	Mamaia, Constanța, Romania
9	Dynamite Fighting Show 19	May 13, 2023	Romeo Iamandi Arena	Buzău, Romania
10	Road to DFS 2	Jun 3, 2023	Târgoviște Arena	Târgoviște, Romania
11	Fight Zone 10	Jun 9, 2023	Deva Arena	Deva, Romania
12	Urban Legend 16: Urban Legend vs. Benny Fight Academy	Jun 10, 2023	La Scoica Land	Mamaia, Constanța, Romania
13	Gladius World Series 2	Jun 24, 2023	Palazzetto dello Sport	Milan, Italy
14	Colosseum Tournament 39	Jun 30, 2023	Suceava Fortress	Suceava, Romania
15	Kombat London 2: Lambagiu vs. Mineiro	Jun 30, 2023	Harrow Leisure Centre	London, England
16	SNF 4	Sep 8, 2023	Dej Arena	Dej, Romania
17	Dynamite Fighting Show 20	Sep 22, 2023	Bucharest Arena	Bucharest, Romania
18	Colosseum Tournament 40	Oct 20, 2023	Lascăr Pană Arena	Baia Mare, Romania
19	MO Fighting Show 1	Oct 21, 2023	PalaRuffini	Turin, Italy
—	Kombat London 3 (Postponed)	Nov 3, 2023	The O2 Arena	London, England
20	Urban Legend 17: Romania vs. Netherlands Superpro	Nov 11, 2023	La Scoica Land	Mamaia, Constanța, Romania
21	Colosseum Tournament 41	Dec 8, 2023	Olimpia Arena	Ploiești, Romania
22	Dynamite Fighting Show 21	Dec 15, 2023	Galați Ice Arena	Galați, Romania

== Road to DFS 1 ==
Road to DFS 1
- Promotion: Dynamite Fighting Show; Thai Boxe Mania
- Date: January 28, 2023
- Venue: Palasport di Torino
- City: Turin, Italy
- Attendance: 5,000

Event chronology
Urban Legend 14	Road to DFS 1	Transilvania Mix Kombat

Road to DFS 1: Lambagiu vs. Guiderdone was a kickboxing and Muay Thai event produced by the Dynamite Fighting Show in association with Thai Boxe Mania that took place on January 28, 2023 at the Palasport di Torino in Turin, Italy.

=== Background ===
A welterweight bout between current ISKA World Middleweight Oriental Rules Champion Christian Guiderdone and Florin Lambagiu headlined the event.

=== Results ===
Main card (Sport Extra Player)
Weight class				Method	Round	Time	Notes
Welterweight	(Romania) Florin Lambagiu	def.	(Italy) Christian Guiderdone	KO (right hook)	2	0:15
Light Middleweight	(Spain) Álex Fernández Grau	def.	(Romania) Bogdan Năstase	Decision (unanimous)	3	3:00
Light Heavyweight	(Romania) Marius Rotaru	vs.	(Italy) Michele Mastromatteo	Draw	3	3:00
Bantamweight (Muay Thai)	(Thailand) YodPT Petchrungruang	def.	(Italy) Andrea Serra	TKO (doctor stoppage)	4	3:00	(Note: For the WBC Muaythai Nai Khanom Tom Lightweight Championship.)
Super Featherweight (Muay Thai)	(France) Youssouf Ouattara	def.	(Italy) Pasquale Amoroso	Decision (split)	5	3:00	(Note: For the WKN Intercontinental Super Lightweight Championship.)
Lightweight	(Italy) Vincenzo Di Nicola	def.	(Switzerland) Killian Emery	Decision (majority)	3	3:00
Women's Strawweight (Muay Thai)	(Albania) Joana Kiptiu	def.	(Spain) Marina Becerra Chávez	Decision (unanimous)	5	2:00	(Note: For the WBC Muaythai Mediterranean Flyweight Championship.)
Super Featherweight (Muay Thai)	(Italy) Christian Zahe	def.	(Belgium) Stéphane Candel	Decision (unanimous)	3	3:00

== Transilvania Mix Kombat ==
Transilvania Mix Kombat
- Promotion: Professional Fight Gym
- Date: February 4, 2023
- Venue: Bistrița Arena
- City: Bistrița, Romania

Event chronology
Road to DFS 1	Transilvania Mix Kombat	OSS Fighters 09

Transilvania Mix Kombat: Lutaniuc vs. Conea was a kickboxing event produced by the Professional Fight Gym that took place on February 4, 2023 at the Bistrița Arena in Bistrița, Romania.

=== Results ===
Main card (Facebook)
Weight class				Method	Round	Time	Notes
Welterweight	(Romania) Sebastian Lutaniuc	def.	(Romania) Cristian-Gabriel Conea	Decision (unanimous)	3	3:00
Middleweight	(Romania) Ionuț Zdrabău	def.	(Romania) Serkan Çelebi	TKO (three knockdowns)	1	2:45
Lightweight	(Romania) Bogdan Suru	def.	(Romania) Darius Criste	Decision (split)	3	3:00
Lightweight	(Romania) Cătălin Makove	def.	(Romania) Darius Zegrean	KO (punches and kicks)	1	2:34
Super Welterweight	(Romania) Valentin Sechelaru	def.	(Romania) Gabriel Morar	Decision (unanimous)	3	3:00

== Dynamite Fighting Show 18 ==
Dynamite Fighting Show 18
- Promotion: Dynamite Fighting Show
- Date: March 12, 2023
- Venue: Constantin Jude Arena
- City: Timișoara, Romania
- Attendance: 2,200

Event chronology
OSS Fighters 09	Dynamite Fighting Show 18	Kombat London 1

Dynamite Fighting Show 18: Stoica vs. Tok (also known as Final Fight) was a kickboxing event produced by the Dynamite Fighting Show that took place on March 12, 2023 at the Constantin Jude Arena in Timișoara, Romania.

=== Results ===
Main card (Sport Extra Player)
Weight class				Method	Round	Time	Notes
Heavyweight	(Romania) Bogdan Stoica	def.	(Germany) Vladimir Toktasynov	KO (flying knee)	2	1:23
Heavyweight	(Romania) Daniel Corbeanu	def.	(Turkey) Erkan Varol	TKO (three knockdowns)	2	2:37
Welterweight	(Romania) Eduard Gafencu	def.	(Romania) Mădălin Crăciunică	TKO (three knockdowns)	1	2:50	(Note: DFS Welterweight Championship Tournament Quarterfinal.)
Heavyweight	(Romania) Sebastian Cozmâncă	def.	(Romania) Ilie Brancu	TKO (three knockdowns/low kicks)	1	2:58	(Note: DFS Heavyweight Championship Tournament Quarterfinal.)
Welterweight	(Romania) Andrei Ostrovanu	def.	(Romania) Flavius Boiciuc	KO (knee to the head)	2	3:00	(Note: DFS Welterweight Championship Tournament Quarterfinal.)
Light Middleweight	(Romania) Bogdan Năstase	def.	(Brazil) Rodrigo Mineiro	Decision (unanimous)	3	3:00
Heavyweight	(Romania) Florin Ivănoaie	def.	(Romania) Cosmin Bucoveanu	TKO (doctor stoppage)	1	3:00	(Note: DFS Heavyweight Championship Tournament Quarterfinal.)
Heavyweight	(Romania) Cristian-Gabriel Conea	def.	(Romania) Valentin Petruț	Decision (split)	3	3:00
Preliminary Card
Cruiserweight	(Romania) Gabriel Bodescu	def.	(Romania) Flavius Petrescu	Decision (unanimous)	3	3:00
Welterweight	(Romania) Bogdan Takacs	def.	(Romania) Florin Rus	TKO (referee stoppage)	2	1:08
Lightweight	(Romania) Andrei Varga	def.	(Romania) Darius Zegrean	TKO (retirement)	2	3:00

=== DFS Welterweight Championship Tournament ===
Quarter-finals
Andrei Ostrovanu	KO
Flavius Boiciuc	2
Florin Lambagiu	May
Costin Dinu	15
Eduard Gafencu	March
Mădălin Crăciunică	12
Ștefan Orza	May
Cezar Buzdugan	15

Semi-finals
Andrei Ostrovanu	September
Eduard Gafencu	September

Final
November

=== DFS Heavyweight Championship Tournament ===
Quarter-finals
Sebastian Cozmâncă	TKO
Ilie Brancu	1
Ionuț Iancu	May
Sebastian Lutaniuc	15
Florin Ivănoaie	TKO
Cosmin Bucoveanu	1
Cristian Ristea	May
Marius Munteanu	15

Semi-finals
Sebastian Cozmâncă	September
Florin Ivănoaie	September

Final
November

== Kombat London 1 ==
Kombat London 1
- Promotion: Kombat London
- Date: March 17, 2023
- Venue: Harrow Leisure Centre
- City: London, England
- Attendance: 2,600

Event chronology
DFS 18	Kombat London 1	Urban Legend 14

Kombat London 1: Lambagiu vs. Childs was a kickboxing, mixed martial arts and boxing event produced by the Kombat London that took place on March 17, 2023, at Harrow Leisure Centre in London, England.

=== Results ===
Fight card (WebVideoCore PPV)
Weight class				Method	Round	Time	Notes
Welterweight	(Romania) Florin Lambagiu	def.	(United Kingdom) Lewis Childs	TKO (referee stoppage)	2	0:59
Heavyweight	(Romania) Anatoli Ciumac	def.	(Poland) Alan Zomkowski	TKO (referee stoppage)	3	1:02
Heavyweight	(Poland) Jakub Doman	def.	(Romania) Marius Munteanu	TKO (referee stoppage)	1	2:00
Lightweight	(Romania) Marian Lăpușneanu	def.	(Romania) Robert Pintilie	Decision (unanimous)	3	2:00
Featherweight	(Republic of Ireland) Liam Cullen	def.	(United Kingdom) Danny West	KO (low kick)	1	0:44
Cruiserweight	(Romania) Sebastian Lutaniuc	def.	(Moldova) Daniel Zaharia	Decision (unanimous)	3	2:00
Middleweight	(Jamaica) Menilek Techane	def.	(Romania) Nicolai Buceac	Decision (unanimous)	3	2:00
Lightweight	(Romania) Bogdan Suru	def.	(Brazil) Ricardo Moraes	KO (punches and knee)	2	0:32
Super Middleweight	(Kyrgyzstan) Soltonoi Kasymkulov	def.	(Romania) Florin Ionel Ene	TKO (punches)	3	1:04
Lightweight	(Romania) Marius Popa	def.	(Brazil) Itamar Ferreira	KO (punch)	1	0:41
Heavyweight	(Romania) Florin Constantin	def.	(Romania) Leonard Onofrei	Decision (unanimous)	3	2:00

== Urban Legend 14 ==
Urban Legend 14
- Promotion: Urban Legend
- Date: April 1, 2023
- Venue: La Scoica Land
- City: Mamaia, Romania

Event chronology
Kombat London 1	Urban Legend 14	Legendele Moldovei

Urban Legend 14: Urban Legend vs. Scorpions Iași was a kickboxing event produced by the Urban Legend that took place on April 1, 2023 at the La Scoica Land in Mamaia, Romania.

=== Results ===
Main card (UrbanLegend.ro PPV)
Weight class				Method	Round	Time	Notes
Welterweight	(Romania) Costel Șchiopu	def.	(Romania) Marian-Florin Soare	KO (knee)	2	2:05
Heavyweight	(Romania) Yanis Ciulin	def.	(Romania) Laurențiu Gavril	TKO (towel thrown)	2	2:09
Super Middleweight	(Romania) Marius Rotaru	def.	(Romania) Damian Ungureanu	Decision (unanimous)	3	3:00
Middleweight	(Romania) Alexandru Vîrlan	def.	(Romania) Ionuț Petcu	TKO (referee stoppage)	2	1:05
Welterweight	(Romania) Bogdan Slabu	def.	(Romania) Wolfman Popescu	TKO (three knockdowns)	2	1:18
Lightweight	(Romania) Adelin Bucătaru	def.	(Romania) Zevri Khaled Onur	KO (body punch)	2	3:00
Super Featherweight	(Romania) Emanuel Lupașcu	def.	(Turkey) Florin Memet	Decision (unanimous)	3	3:00
Junior Featherweight	(Romania) Marko Dușinschi	def.	(Romania) Daniel Handrea	Ext. R Decision (split)	4	3:00
Bantamweight	(Romania) Marian Lupașcu	def.	(China) Robert Hu Hua Long	Decision (majority)	3	3:00
Women's Bantamweight	(Romania) Denisa Vulpe	def.	(Romania) Lăcrămioara Popa	Decision (unanimous)	3	3:00

== Legendele Moldovei ==
Legendele Moldovei
- Promotion: Legend Iași; Garuda Absolute Leadership
- Date: April 8, 2023
- Venue: Iași Arena
- City: Iași, Romania

Event chronology
Urban Legend 14: Urban Legend vs. Scorpions Iași	Legendele Moldovei	Colosseum Tournament 38

Legendele Moldovei (also known as Legends of Moldavia) was a kickboxing event produced by the Legend Iași in association with Garuda Absolute Leadership that took place on April 8, 2023 at the Iași Arena in Iași, Romania.

=== Results ===
Main card (YouTube)
Weight class				Method	Round	Time	Notes
Lightweight	(Romania) Stevenson Lăcuste	def.	(Moldova) Alex Malanici	TKO (three knockdowns)	1	2:51
Junior Featherweight	(Moldova) Maximus Bejenuță	def.	(Romania) Ștefan Drujă	Decision (unanimous)	3	3:00
Junior Featherweight	(Romania) Adrian Luca	def.	(Moldova) Octavian Crețu	Decision (unanimous)	3	3:00
Light Heavyweight	(Romania) Alin Nechita	def.	(Moldova) Alexandr Rojco	TKO (towel thrown/punches)	1	0:28
Bantamweight	(Moldova) Valerii Strungari	def.	(Romania) Victor Dimitriu	Ext. R Decision	4	3:00
Light Welterweight	(Moldova) Vladislav Draga	def.	(Moldova) Cristin Musteață	Decision (split)	3	3:00
Women's Flyweight	(Romania) Andreea Cebuc	def.	(Moldova) Nelea Băț	TKO (towel thrown)	1	0:58

== Colosseum Tournament 38 ==
Colosseum Tournament 38
- Promotion: Colosseum Tournament
- Date: May 5, 2023
- Venue: Dumitru Popescu-Colibași Arena
- City: Brașov, Romania
- Attendance: 3,100

Event chronology
Legendele Moldovei	Colosseum Tournament 38	Urban Legend 15

Colosseum Tournament 38: Lăpușneanu vs. Argyo was a kickboxing and boxing event produced by the Colosseum Tournament that took place on May 5, 2023, at the Dumitru Popescu-Colibași Arena in Brașov, Romania.

=== Results ===
Main card (FightBox)
Weight class				Method	Round	Time	Notes
Lightweight	(Romania) Marian Lăpușneanu	def.	(Romania) Darius Argyo	Decision (unanimous)	5	3:00	(Note: For the vacant Colosseum Tournament World Lightweight Championship.)
Featherweight	(Romania) Valentin Mavrodin (c)	def.	(Romania) Daniel Dragomir	TKO (referee stoppage)	5	2:52	(Note: For the Colosseum Tournament New Heroes Featherweight Championship.)
Featherweight	(Romania) Ionuț Popa	def.	(Spain) Marian Doiciuc	TKO (referee stoppage)	1	0:54
Featherweight	(Romania) Alex Popescu	def.	(Turkey) Florin Memet	Decision (unanimous)	3	3:00
Featherweight	(Romania) Dănuț Popa	def.	(France) Silviu Ionescu	TKO (corner stoppage)	2	3:00
Welterweight	(Romania) Alex Burada	def.	(Romania) David Anton	TKO (doctor stoppage/cut)	1	3:00
Lightweight	(Romania) Denis Ceaușu	def.	(Romania) Liviu Ionilă	Decision (unanimous)	3	3:00

== Urban Legend 15 ==
Urban Legend 15
- Promotion: Urban Legend
- Date: May 6, 2023
- Venue: La Scoica Land
- City: Mamaia, Romania

Event chronology
Colosseum Tournament 38	Urban Legend 15	DFS 19

Urban Legend 15: Urban Legend vs. Stoica Brothers Fight Academy was a kickboxing event produced by the Urban Legend that took place on May 6, 2023 at the La Scoica Land in Mamaia, Romania.

=== Results ===
Main card (UrbanLegend.ro PPV)
Weight class				Method	Round	Time	Notes
Heavyweight	(Romania) Silviu Streinu	def.	(Romania) Cosmin Bucoveanu	Decision	3	3:00
Lightweight	(Moldova) Serghei Zanosiev	def.	(Romania) Marian-Florin Soare	KO (liver punch)	2	2:05
Cruiserweight	(Romania) Daniel Manole	def.	(Romania) Laurențiu Gavril	Decision	3	3:00
Middleweight	(Romania) Serkan Çelebi	def.	(Romania) Luca Dinu	Ext. R Decision	4	3:00
Welterweight	(Romania) Wolfman Popescu	def.	(Romania) Andrei Niță	Decision	3	3:00
Bantamweight	(China) Robert Hu Hua Long	def.	(Romania) Claudiu Brilă	Decision	3	3:00

== Dynamite Fighting Show 19 ==
Dynamite Fighting Show 19
- Promotion: Dynamite Fighting Show
- Date: May 13, 2023
- Venue: Romeo Iamandi Arena
- City: Buzău, Romania
- Attendance: 3,000

Event chronology
Urban Legend 15	Dynamite Fighting Show 19	Road to DFS 2

Dynamite Fighting Show 19: Lătescu vs. Kosut (also known as Red Alert in Buzău) was a kickboxing event produced by the Dynamite Fighting Show that took place on May 13, 2023 at the Romeo Iamandi Arena in Buzău, Romania.

=== Results ===
Main card (Sport Extra Player)
Weight class				Method	Round	Time	Notes
Cruiserweight	(Romania) Ștefan Lătescu	def.	(Poland) Adam Kosut	KO (right hook)	1	1:15
Welterweight	(Romania) Florin Lambagiu	def.	(Romania) Costin Dinu	Decision (unanimous)	3	3:00	(Note: DFS Welterweight Championship Tournament Quarterfinal.)
Heavyweight	(Romania) Cristian Ristea	def.	(Romania) Marius Munteanu	TKO (referee stoppage)	3	2:29	(Note: DFS Heavyweight Championship Tournament Quarterfinal.)
Heavyweight	(Romania) Sebastian Cozmâncă	def.	(Slovenia) Miran Fabjan	Decision (unanimous)	3	3:00
Light Middleweight	(Greece) Nikos Tzotzos	def.	(Romania) Claudiu Bădoi	Decision (unanimous)	3	3:00
Heavyweight	(Romania) Ionuț Iancu	def.	(Romania) Sebastian Lutaniuc	TKO (referee stoppage)	4	0:40	(Note: DFS Heavyweight Championship Tournament Quarterfinal.)
Light Middleweight	(Romania) Bogdan Năstase	def.	(Germany) Ramazon Nuriddinov	Decision (unanimous)	3	3:00
Heavyweight	(Romania) Valentin Bordianu	def.	(Romania) Ilie Brancu	KO (punches)	1	2:59
Welterweight	(Romania) Ștefan Orza	def.	(Romania) Cezar Buzdugan	Decision (unanimous)	3	3:00	(Note: DFS Welterweight Championship Tournament Quarterfinal.)
Lightweight	(Romania) Călin Petrișor	def.	(Italy) Sheriff Konteh	Decision (unanimous)	3	3:00

=== DFS Welterweight Championship Tournament ===
Quarter-finals
Andrei Ostrovanu	KO
Flavius Boiciuc	2
Florin Lambagiu	May
Costin Dinu	13
Eduard Gafencu	March
Mădălin Crăciunică	12
Ștefan Orza	May
Cezar Buzdugan	13

Semi-finals
Andrei Ostrovanu	September
Florin Lambagiu
Eduard Gafencu	September
Ștefan Orza

Final
November

=== DFS Heavyweight Championship Tournament ===
Quarter-finals
Sebastian Cozmâncă	TKO
Ilie Brancu	1
Ionuț Iancu	May
Sebastian Lutaniuc	13
Florin Ivănoaie	TKO
Cosmin Bucoveanu	1
Cristian Ristea	May
Marius Munteanu	13

Semi-finals
Sebastian Cozmâncă	September
Ionuț Iancu
Florin Ivănoaie	September
Cristian Ristea

Final
November

== Road to DFS 2 ==
Road to DFS 2
- Promotion: Dynamite Fighting Show; Confruntarea Titanilor
- Date: June 3, 2023
- Venue: Târgoviște Arena
- City: Târgoviște, Romania
- Attendance: 2,000

Event chronology
DFS 19	Road to DFS 2	Fight Zone 10

Road to DFS 2: Petrișor vs. Mitsinigkos (also known as Confruntarea Titanilor 25 or Clash of the Titans 25) was a kickboxing and mixed martial arts event produced by the Dynamite Fighting Show in association with Confruntarea Titanilor that took place on June 3, 2023 at the Târgoviște Arena in Târgoviște, Romania.

=== Results ===
Main card (Sport Extra Player)
Weight class				Method	Round	Time	Notes
Featherweight	(Romania) Călin Petrișor	def.	(Greece) Panagiotis Mitsinigkos	TKO (punches)	4	2:25	(Note: For the ISKA European Light Welterweight Championship.)
Heavyweight	(Romania) Ionuț Iancu	def.	(Netherlands) Winfried Jops	Decision (split)	3	3:00
Welterweight	(Romania) Bogdan Năstase	def.	(Switzerland) Patrick Cescatti	Decision (split)	3	3:00
Middleweight	(Romania) Ionuț Busuioc	def.	(Romania) Gabriel Bodescu	Decision (unanimous)	3	3:00
Lightweight	(Romania) Serghei Zanosiev	def.	(Romania) Denis Ceaușu	Decision (unanimous)	3	3:00
Welterweight	(Romania) Mario Chivulescu	def.	(Romania) Samuel Stroica	Decision (unanimous)	3	3:00
Super Featherweight	(Romania) Adrian Baciu	def.	(Romania) Darius Zegrean	TKO (doctor stoppage/cut)	1	1:11
Junior Lightweight	(Romania) Cristian Neacșu	def.	(Romania) Alex Kalai	Decision (unanimous)	3	3:00

== Fight Zone 10 ==
Fight Zone 10
- Promotion: Fight Zone
- Date: June 9, 2023
- Venue: Deva Arena
- City: Deva, Romania

Event chronology
Road to DFS 2	Fight Zone 10	Urban Legend 16

Fight Zone 10: Ivănoaie vs. Linnic was a kickboxing and boxing event produced by the Fight Zone that took place on June 9, 2023 at the Deva Arena in Deva, Romania.

=== Results ===
Main card (TomTix Player)
Weight class				Method	Round	Time	Notes
Heavyweight	(Romania) Florin Ivănoaie	def.	(Moldova) Iaroslav Linnic	Decision	3	3:00
Heavyweight	(Moldova) Victor Mihailovik	def.	(Romania) Ilie Brancu	TKO (referee stoppage)	2	2:41
Heavyweight	(Romania) Cristian-Gabriel Conea	def.	(Romania) Cosmin Bucoveanu	Decision (unanimous)	3	3:00
Light Heavyweight	(Romania) Alin Nicola	def.	(Romania) Daniel Micu	Decision (majority)	3	3:00
Heavyweight	(Romania) Andrei Vesa	def.	(Romania) Marian Dinu	Decision (unanimous)	3	3:00
Welterweight	(Romania) Bogdan Takács	def.	(Romania) Robert Pintilie	Decision (unanimous)	3	3:00
Featherweight	(Romania) Alex Popescu	def.	(Romania) Alex Moisescu	Decision (unanimous)	3	3:00
Preliminary Card
	(Romania) Bogdan Bodi	def.	(Romania) Darius Boboiciov	Decision	3	2:00
	(Romania) Marian Dudu	def.	(Romania) Leonard Drăghia	KO (spinning kick)	2	0:15
	(Romania) Adelin Gafton	def.	(Romania) Paul Covaci	Decision	3	2:00
	(Romania) Fabian Popescu	def.	(Romania) Florin Tătaru	Decision	3	2:00
	(Romania) Răzvan Mandache	def.	(Romania) Robert Cernovschi	Decision	3	2:00
	(Romania) Robert Ionescu	def.	(Romania) Patrick Barhan	Decision	3	2:00
	(Romania) Cătălin Nate	def.	(Romania) Marius Bodiu	TKO (referee stoppage)	1	2:16
	(Romania) Răzvan Mădălin	def.	(Romania) Cristian Bodiu	Decision	3	2:00

== Urban Legend 16 ==
Urban Legend 16
- Promotion: Urban Legend
- Date: June 10, 2023
- Venue: La Scoica Land
- City: Mamaia, Romania

Event chronology
Fight Zone 10	Urban Legend 16	GWS 2

Urban Legend 16: Urban Legend vs. Benny Fight Academy was a kickboxing event produced by the Urban Legend that took place on June 10, 2023 at the La Scoica Land in Mamaia, Romania.

=== Results ===
Main card (UrbanLegend.ro PPV)
Weight class				Method	Round	Time	Notes
Light Heavyweight	(Romania) Dan Bradea	def.	(Romania) Radu Medeleanu	Decision	3	3:00
Welterweight	(Romania) Daniel Moldoveanu	def.	(Romania) Marian-Florin Soare	Decision	3	3:00
Lightweight	(Romania) Marius Cimpoieru	def.	(Romania) Florin Memet	Decision	3	3:00
Welterweight	(Romania) Marius Babețiu	def.	(Romania) Marius Claudiu	Decision	3	3:00
Lightweight	(Romania) Rasim Geaner	def.	(Romania) Sebastian Obreja	Decision	3	3:00

== GWS 2 ==
GWS 2
- Promotion: Gladius World Series
- Date: June 24, 2023
- Venue: Palazzetto dello Sport
- City: Milan, Italy

Event chronology
Urban Legend 16	GWS 2	Colosseum Tournament 39

GWS 2: Hnatchuk vs. Mazzola was a kickboxing and Muay Thai event produced by the Gladius World Series that took place on June 24, 2023, at the Palazzetto dello Sport in Milan, Italy.

=== Results ===
Main card (FightBox/FITE)
Weight class				Method	Round	Time	Notes
Lightweight	(Ukraine) Taras Hnatchuk	def.	(Italy) Michele Mazzola	TKO (flying knee)	3	2:59
Featherweight (Muay Thai)	(Germany) Arthur Lier	def.	(Italy) Lenny Blasi	KO (spinning back elbow)	1	2:36
Welterweight	(Morocco) Anouar Khamlali	def.	(Italy) Daniel Velea	TKO (towel thrown)	2	0:48
Light Welterweight	(Italy) Andrea Alladio	def.	(Italy) Matteo Costa	Decision (unanimous)	3	3:00
Featherweight	(Italy) Francesco Ippolito	def.	(Romania) Darius-Lorenzo Iancu	Decision (unanimous)	3	3:00
Women's Featherweight	(Italy) Chiara Giusti	vs.	(Italy) Rebecca Vaiani	Draw	3	3:00
Super Flyweight	(Italy) Fabio Zeccola	def.	(Mongolia) Tennun Gantushing	Decision (split)	3	3:00

== Colosseum Tournament 39 ==
Colosseum Tournament 39
- Promotion: Colosseum Tournament
- Date: June 30, 2023
- Venue: Suceava Fortress
- City: Suceava, Romania
- Attendance: 3,500

Event chronology
GWS 2	Colosseum Tournament 39	Kombat London 2

Colosseum Tournament: Amariței vs. De Vries was an outdoor kickboxing event produced by the Colosseum Tournament in association with Bukovina Museum that took place on June 30, 2023, at the Suceava Fortress in Suceava, Romania.

Semmy Schilt and Ismael Londt made special guest appearances at the event.

=== Results ===
Main card (FightBox/FITE)
Weight class				Method	Round	Time	Notes
Light Heavyweight	(Netherlands) Thian de Vries	def.	(Romania) Vasile Amariței	KO (spinning back fist)	2	1:22	(Note: For the inaugural Colosseum Tournament World Light Heavyweight Championship.)
Bantamweight	(Romania) Mihai Rusu	def.	(Netherlands) Sakvan Arab	Ext. R Decision (split)	4	3:00
Welterweight	(Romania) Alex Amariței	def.	(Estonia) Taur Guitor	TKO (three knockdowns/low kicks)	2:52	1	(Note: For the interim Colosseum Tournament World Welterweight Championship.)
Lightweight	(Netherlands) Mustapha Hourri	def.	(Romania) Liviu Ionilă	Ext. R Decision (unanimous)	4	3:00
Heavyweight	(Romania) Marian Duncă	def.	(Romania) Alin Nicola	Decision (split)	3	3:00
Super Lightweight	(Romania) Andrei Sîrghi	def.	(Romania) Rayko Levițchi	Ext. R Decision (unanimous)	4	3:00
Featherweight	(Romania) Bogdan Floriștean	def.	(Romania) Ionel Bălan	Decision (unanimous)	3	3:00
Preliminary Card
Women's Featherweight	(Morocco) Ibtissam Kassrioui	def.	(Romania) Lăcrămioara Popa	TKO (punches)	2	1:12
Welterweight	(Romania) Dorin Stan	def.	(Moldova) Lucian Genunchi	Decision (split)	3	3:00
Bantamweight	(Romania) Ștefan Drujă	def.	(Romania) Daniel Handrea	Decision (split)	3	3:00

== Kombat London 2 ==
Kombat London 2
- Promotion: Kombat London
- Date: June 30, 2023
- Venue: Harrow Leisure Centre
- City: London, England
- Attendance: 5,000

Event chronology
Colosseum Tournament 39	Kombat London 2	DFS 20

Kombat London 2: Lambagiu vs. Mineiro was kickboxing event produced by the Kombat London that took place on June 30, 2023, at Harrow Leisure Centre in London, England.

=== Results ===
Main card (WebVideoCore PPV)
Weight class				Method	Round	Time	Notes
Welterweight	(Romania) Florin Lambagiu	def.	(Brazil) Rodrigo Mineiro	Decision (unanimous)	3	3:00
Welterweight	(United Kingdom) Dean Pattinson	def.	(Romania) Anghel Cardoş	Decision (unanimous)	5	3:00
Heavyweight	(Moldova) Anatoli Ciumac	def.	(Romania) Nino Pattvean	Decision (split)	3	3:00
Heavyweight	(Romania) Marius Munteanu	def.	(Moldova) Alex Velenciuc	KO (punches)	1	1:17
Heavyweight	(Romania) Sebastian Lutaniuc	def.	(Lithuania) Aidas Ceckauskas	Decision (unanimous)	3	3:00
Heavyweight	(Romania) Alin Nechita	def.	(Poland) Jakub Doman	Decision (unanimous)	3	3:00
Lightweight	(Romania) Marius Popa	def.	(United Kingdom) Jack Johnson	TKO (low kick)	2	1:52
Welterweight	(Romania) Andrei Leuştean	def.	(United Kingdom) Danny Anderson	TKO (low kick/punches)	1	0:50
Featherweight	(Romania) Daniel Dragomir	def.	(Romania) Vlăduț Andrei	Decision (unanimous)	3	3:00
Lightweight	(Romania) Marian Lăpușneanu	def.	(Romania) Bogdan Suru	Decision (unanimous)	3	3:00

== Dynamite Fighting Show 20 ==
Dynamite Fighting Show 20
- Promotion: Dynamite Fighting Show
- Date: September 22, 2023
- Venue: Bucharest Arena
- City: Bucharest, Romania
- Attendance: 4,500

Event chronology
Kombat London 2	Dynamite Fighting Show 20	Colosseum Tournament 40

Dynamite Fighting Show 20: Iancu vs. Cozmâncă (also known as The Moment of Truth 2) was a kickboxing event produced by the Dynamite Fighting Show that took place on September 22, 2023 at the Bucharest Arena in Bucharest, Romania.

=== Results ===
Main card (Sport Extra Player)
Weight class				Method	Round	Time	Notes
Heavyweight	(Romania) Ionuț Iancu (c)	def.	(Romania) Sebastian Cozmâncă	Decision (unanimous)	3	3:00	(Note: DFS Heavyweight Championship Tournament Quarterfinal.)
Heavyweight	(Romania) Florin Ivănoaie	def.	(Romania) Cristian Ristea	Decision (unanimous)	3	3:00	(Note: DFS Heavyweight Championship Tournament Quarterfinal.)
Welterweight	(Romania) Ștefan Orza	def.	(Romania) Eduard Gafencu	Decision (unanimous)	3	3:00	(Note: DFS Welterweight Championship Tournament Semifinal.)
Super Welterweight	(Romania) Bogdan Năstase	def.	(Turkey) Ömer Pişgin	Decision (unanimous)	3	3:00
Openweight	(Romania) Claudiu Bădoi	def.	(Poland) Dominik Jędrzejczyk	TKO (doctor stoppage)	2	3:00
Welterweight	(Romania) Andrei Leuştean	def.	(Turkey) Ali Göktürk Benli	Decision (unanimous)	3	3:00
Lightweight	(Romania) Ionuț Popa	def.	(Moldova) Serghei Zanosiev	Decision (unanimous)	3	3:00
Lightweight	(Romania) Marius Cimpoeru	def.	(Romania) Denis Ceaușu	Decision (unanimous)	3	3:00
Preliminary Card
Women's Bantamweight	(Romania) Andreea Cebuc	def.	(Romania) Denisa Vulpe	Decision (unanimous)	3	3:00
Featherweight	(Romania) Ionel Bălan	def.	(Romania) Edmond Mustafa	Decision (unanimous)	3	3:00

=== DFS Welterweight Championship Tournament ===
Quarter-finals
Andrei Ostrovanu	KO
Flavius Boiciuc	2
Florin Lambagiu	UD
Costin Dinu	3
Eduard Gafencu	TKO
Mădălin Crăciunică	1
Ștefan Orza	UD
Cezar Buzdugan	3

Semi-finals
Andrei Ostrovanu	INJ.
Florin Lambagiu
Eduard Gafencu	3
Ștefan Orza	UD

Final
Florin Lambagiu	December
Ștefan Orza

=== DFS Heavyweight Championship Tournament ===
Quarter-finals
Sebastian Cozmâncă	TKO
Ilie Brancu	1
Ionuț Iancu	TKO
Sebastian Lutaniuc	4
Florin Ivănoaie	TKO
Cosmin Bucoveanu	1
Cristian Ristea	TKO
Marius Munteanu	3

Semi-finals
Sebastian Cozmâncă	3
Ionuț Iancu	UD
Florin Ivănoaie	UD
Cristian Ristea	3

Final
Ionuț Iancu	December
Florin Ivănoaie

== Colosseum Tournament 40 ==
Colosseum Tournament 40
- Promotion: Colosseum Tournament
- Date: October 20, 2023
- Venue: Lascăr Pană Arena
- City: Baia Mare, Romania
- Attendance: 1,700

Event chronology
DFS 20	Colosseum Tournament 40	MO Fighting Show 1

Colosseum Tournament 40 was a kickboxing event produced by the Colosseum Tournament that took place on October 20, 2023, at the Lascăr Pană Arena in Baia Mare, Romania.

=== Results ===
Main card (FightBox)
Weight class				Method	Round	Time	Notes
Bantamweight	(Romania) Daniel Dragomir	def.	(Romania) Mihai Rusu	KO (right hook)	4	0:21	(Note: For the vacant Colosseum Tournament World Bantamweight Championship.)
Featherweight	(Romania) Bogdan Floriștean	def.	(Romania) Valentin Mavrodin	TKO (three knockdowns)	1	2:19	(Note: Tournament Final to determine the Colosseum Tournament World Featherweight Champion.)
Featherweight	(Romania) Alex Popescu	vs.	(Romania) Paul Cornea	Draw	5	3:00	(Note: For the vacant Colosseum Tournament New Heroes Featherweight Championship. Originally ruled an extra round split decision victory for Popescu after 6 rounds, result overturned due to regulation.)
Lightweight	(Romania) Marian Lăpușneanu	def.	(Romania) Cătălin Makove	Decision (unanimous)	3	3:00
Heavyweight	(Romania) Tofan Eleazar	def.	(Romania) Andrei Șugar	TKO (referee stoppage)	2	0:30
Heavyweight	(Romania) Alin Nechita	def.	(Iran) Komeil Sharifi	KO (punches)	3	0:18
Welterweight	(Romania) Horia Popan	def.	(Romania) Alexandru Stan	Decision (unanimous)	3	3:00
Super Welterweight	(Brazil) Yves Brusnello	def.	(Romania) Dorin Stan	Decision (unanimous)	3	3:00
Welterweight	(Romania) Antonio Achim	def.	(Romania) Kevin Tunyogi	TKO (referee stoppage)	2	2:01
Featherweight	(Romania) Valentin Mavrodin	def.	(Netherlands) Alfadel Alkasid	Ext. R Decision (split)	4	3:00	(Note: Tournament Semi-final.)
Featherweight	(Romania) Bogdan Floriștean	def.	(Romania) Cosmin Neagu	Decision (unanimous)	3	3:00	(Note: Tournament Semi-final.)

=== World Featherweight Championship bracket ===
Semifinals
(Romania)	Valentin Mavrodin
(Netherlands)	Alfadel Alkasid
(Romania)	Bogdan Floriștean
(Romania)	Cosmin Neagu

Finals

== MO Fighting Show 1 ==
MO Fighting Show 1
- Promotion: MO Fighting Show
- Date: October 21, 2023
- Venue: PalaRuffini
- City: Turin, Italy
- Attendance: 2,500

Event chronology
Colosseum Tournament 40	MO Fighting Show 1	N/A

MO Fighting Show 1: Stoica vs. Zubco was a kickboxing house show event produced by the MO Fighting Show that took place on October 21, 2023, at the PalaRuffini in Turin, Italy.

=== Results ===
Main card
Weight class				Method	Round	Time	Notes
Heavyweight	(Romania) Andrei Stoica	def.	(Moldova) Dragoș Zubco	TKO (retirement)	3	3:00
Lightweight	(Romania) Amansio Paraschiv	def.	(Guinea) Abdourahmane Diallo	Decision (unanimous)	3	3:00
Light Heavyweight	(Romania) Marius Rotaru	def.	(Italy) Michele Mastromatteo	Decision (unanimous)	3	3:00
Super Featherweight	(Italy) Francesco Maggio	def.	(Romania) Ionuț Popa	TKO (corner stoppage)	2	1:57
Women's Bantamweight	(Romania) Andreea Cebuc	def.	(Italy) Chiara Vincis	Ext. R Decision	4	3:00
Lightweight	(Italy) Vincenzo Di Nicola	def.	(Romania) Vlad Trif	Decision (split)	3	3:00

== Colosseum Tournament 41 ==
Colosseum Tournament 41
- Promotion: Colosseum Tournament
- Date: December 8, 2023
- Venue: Olimpia Arena
- City: Ploiești, Romania
- Attendance: 2,400

Event chronology
N/A	Colosseum Tournament 41	DFS 21

Colosseum Tournament 41 was a kickboxing event produced by the Colosseum Tournament that took place on December 8, 2023, at the Olimpia Arena in Ploiești, Romania.

=== Results ===
Main card
Weight class				Method	Round	Time	Notes
Bantamweight	(Romania) Daniel Dragomir	def.	(Romania) Ștefan Drujă	KO (punches)	3	2:58
Cruiserweight	(Netherlands) Thian de Vries	def.	(Romania) Vasile Amariței	KO (punches)	1	1:10
Heavyweight	(Romania) Alin Nechita	def.	(Romania) Marian Duncă	Decision (unanimous)	5	3:00	(Note: For the vacant Colosseum Tournament World Heavyweight Championship.)
Welterweight	(Romania) Mirel Drăgan	def.	(Turkey) Beratcan Davran	Decision (unanimous)	3	3:00	(Note: For the inaugural Colosseum Tournament World Welterweight Kempo Championship.)
Lightweight	(Romania) Adrian Baciu	def.	(Romania) Alex Stancu	TKO (referee stoppage)	2	2:10
Welterweight	(Romania) Alex Burada	def.	(Romania) Sorin Glăvan	Decision (unanimous)	3	3:00
Welterweight	(Romania) Alin Răducu	def.	(Romania) Samuele Tănase	TKO (three knockdowns)	1	2:22
Bantamweight	(Romania) Claudiu Brilă	def.	(Romania) Dragoș Temelie	TKO (referee stoppage)	3	2:01

== Dynamite Fighting Show 21 ==
Dynamite Fighting Show 21
- Promotion: Dynamite Fighting Show
- Date: December 15, 2023
- Venue: Galați Ice Arena
- City: Galați, Romania
- Attendance: 5,000

Event chronology
Colosseum Tournament 41	Dynamite Fighting Show 21	N/A

Dynamite Fighting Show 21: The Grand Finale (also known as Night of Champions 2) was a kickboxing event produced by the Dynamite Fighting Show that took place on December 15, 2023 at the Galați Ice Arena in Galați, Romania.

=== Results ===
Main card (Sport Extra Player)
Weight class				Method	Round	Time	Notes
Welterweight	(Romania) Florin Lambagiu	def.	(Romania) Ștefan Orza	Ext. R Decision (unanimous)	4	3:00	(Note: DFS Welterweight Championship Tournament Final. For the inaugural DFS Welterweight Championship.)
Heavyweight	(Romania) Ionuț Iancu (c)	def.	(Romania) Florin Ivănoaie	TKO (towel thrown)	3	2:40	(Note: DFS Heavyweight Championship Tournament Final. For the DFS Heavyweight Championship.)
Lightweight	(Romania) Valentin Mavrodin	def.	(Romania) Călin Petrișor	Decision (unanimous)	3	3:00
Heavyweight	(Romania) Dănuț Hurduc	def.	(Romania) Cosmin Bucoveanu	Decision (unanimous)	3	3:00
Middleweight	(Romania) Bogdan Năstase	def.	(Brazil) Rodrigo Mineiro	Decision (unanimous)	3	3:00
Welterweight	(Romania) Daniel Moldoveanu	def.	(Romania) Cezar Buzdugan	Decision (unanimous)	3	3:00
Lightweight	(Romania) Marian Lăpușneanu	def.	(Romania) Andrei Varga	Decision (unanimous)	3	3:00

== See also ==
- 2023 in Glory
- 2023 in ONE Championship
- 2023 in K-1
- 2023 in RISE
- 2023 in Wu Lin Feng
