= Florin Lambagiu =

Romanian kickboxer (born 1996)

- Born: Florin Lambagiu; April 8, 1996 (age 30); Scânteia, Iași, Romania
- Other names: Rambo
- Nationality: Romanian
- Height: 5 ft 10 in (1.78 m)
- Weight: 85.5 kg (188 lb; 13.46 st)
- Division: Light heavyweight (2018–2019, 2021–present); Cruiserweight (2018, 2021); Middleweight (2017); Light middleweight (2016)
- Team: Scorpions Iași
- Trainer: Mihai Constantin
- Years active: 2015–present

Kickboxing record
- Total: 44
- Wins: 36
- By knockout: 17
- Losses: 7
- By knockout: 0
- Draws: 1

Other information
- Mixed martial arts record from Sherdog

Florin Lambagiu
Medal record

Representing Romania

Men's Combat Sambo

Romania Sambo National Championship
Gold medal – first place	2018 Bucharest	90 kg

Florin Lambagiu (born 8 April 1996) is a Romanian professional kickboxer, former sambist and mixed martial artist. He currently competes in the super middleweight division of the Dynamite Fighting Show (DFS), where he is the current DFS Super Middleweight Champion and was named Fighter of the Year in 2019. Lambagiu also competed for Colosseum Tournament, where he is the former Colosseum Tournament World Light Welterweight Champion.

As a sambist, Lambagiu primarily competed at 90 kilograms, and was the 2018 Romania National champion. He represented his country at the 2018 World Sambo Championships in Bucharest and at the 2018 European Sambo Championships in Athens. Besides sambo, he is also a national champion in MMA and kickboxing.

As of 1 August 2025, Lambagiu is ranked the #4 super-welterweight kickboxer in the world by Boxemag.

== Background ==
Lambagiu comes from a poor family with four children. The family lived in an adobe house in the village of Lunca Rateș, Iași County. As a child, he helped his father in the forest, then went to work in construction. After finishing eighth grade, Lambagiu lived on his own because he did not want his family to support him. He worked on construction sites. Lambagiu admits he had a happy childhood.

== Kickboxing career ==
Lambagiu signed with Romanian organization Colosseum Tournament in 2017 and became their inaugural Colosseum Tournament World Light Welterweight Champion in the same year.

In May 2018, Lambagiu fought Artur Kyshenko to a draw in a three on one match. In September 2019, Lambagiu defeated at Dynamite Fighting Show 5: Team Moroșanu vs. Team Bonjasky the former SUPERKOMBAT light heavyweight champion Daniel Stefanovski by unanimous decision. As of 19 August 2020, he was the #7 ranked super welterweight in the world, according to the International Professional Combat Council (IPCC).

Lambagiu faced Cyril Benzaquen on May 31, 2022 for the ISKA World Light Heavyweight Championship at Grand Palais Éphémère in Paris, France. He lost the fight via a controversial unanimous decision. The result was disputed by ISKA who blamed the French federation for it.

=== Failed drug test ===
Lambagiu failed a drug test ahead of his scheduled world title bout with Cyril Benzaquen on 31 May 2022, testing positive for performance-enhancing drugs. He received a 4-year suspension by the National Anti-Doping Agency of France (AFLD) from participation in all sports events organized or authorized by French sports federations until 3 August 2026.

== Kickboxing style ==
Nicknamed "Rambo", Lambagiu is known for his punching power and powerful hooks.

== Personal life ==
He is married and has a son, Yanis Matei (b. 2021). Sebastian Cozmâncă is godfather for this child.

== Championships and accomplishments ==
=== Kickboxing ===
- Dynamite Fighting Show
  - DFS Super Middleweight Championship (One time, current)
  - First DFS Super Middleweight Champion
  - DFS Season Six Super Middleweight Tournament Winner
  - 2022 Most Popular Fighter of the Year
  - 2019 Fighter of the Year
  - Dynamite Fighting Show 4 Welterweight Tournament Winner
  - Performance of the Night (Three times) vs. Claudiu Bădoi and Flavius Boiciuc, Alexandru Radnev, and Daniel Stefanovski
  - Fight of the Night (Two times) vs. Alexandru Radnev and Daniel Stefanovski
- Kyokushin World Union
  - 2021 KWU Middleweight Championship (Current)
- Colosseum Tournament
  - 2017 Colosseum Tournament World Light Welterweight Championship (Inaugural)
- Kickboxing Romania Awards
  - 2025 Comeback of the Year
  - 2023 Controversy of the Year vs. Ștefan Orza at DFS 21

=== Sambo ===
- Romanian Sambo Federation
  - 2018 Romania Sambo National Championship

== Kickboxing record ==
Kickboxing record
36 wins (17 KOs), 7 losses (0 KOs), 1 draw
Date	Result	Opponent	Event	Location	Method	Round	Time
2026-10-09	Win	(Romania) Cristian Ristea	K-1 World GP -90kg Preliminary in Iași	Iași, Romania	Decision (unanimous)	3	3:00
2026-04-03	Loss	(Moldova) Constantin Rusu	Dynamite Fighting Show 30	Bucharest, Romania	Decision (unanimous)	3	3:00
2026-02-28	Loss	(Moldova) Constantin Rusu	SENSHI 30 – 75 kg Grand Prix, Quarterfinals	Varna, Bulgaria	Decision (unanimous)	3	3:00
2025-10-24	Win	(Netherlands) Christian Baya	DFS 28	Pitești, Romania	Decision (majority)	3	3:00
2025-06-08	Win	(Brazil) Rodrigo Mineiro	DFS 27	Baia Mare, Romania	Extra round decision (unanimous)	4	3:00
2025-03-07	Win	(Romania) Anatoli Ciumac	DFS 26	Râmnicu Vâlcea, Romania	Decision (split)	3	3:00
2023-12-15	Win	(Romania) Ștefan Orza	Dynamite Fighting Show 21 - Welterweight Championship Tournament, Finals	Galați, Romania	Ext. R decision (unanimous)	4	3:00
Won the inaugural DFS Welterweight Championship.
2023-07-08	Loss	(Morocco) Mehdi Ait El Hadj	Senshi 17	Varna, Bulgaria	Decision (unanimous)	3	3:00
2023-06-30	Win	(Brazil) Rodrigo Mineiro	Kombat London 2	London, England	Decision (unanimous)	3	3:00
2023-05-13	Win	(Romania) Costin Dinu	Dynamite Fighting Show 19 - Welterweight Championship Tournament, Quarter Finals	Buzău, Romania	Decision (unanimous)	3	3:00
2023-03-17	Win	(United Kingdom) Lewis Childs	Kombat London 1	London, England	TKO (referee stoppage)	2	0:59
2023-02-18	Win	(France) Mickaël Lopes Da Veiga	Senshi 15	Varna, Bulgaria	KO (right hook)	1	2:59
2023-01-28	Win	(Italy) Christian Guiderdone	Road to DFS 1	Turin, Italy	KO (right hook)	2	0:15
2022-12-08	Win	(France) Majid Amarouche	Dynamite Fighting Show 17	Constanța, Romania	TKO (three knockdowns)	4	2:35
2022-10-19	Loss	(France) Diaguely Camara	Dynamite Fighting Show 16	Iași, Romania	Decision (unanimous)	3	3:00
2022-09-10	Win	(Morocco) Mehdi Ait El Hadj	Senshi 13	Varna, Bulgaria	Extra round decision (split)	4	3:00
2022-07-09	Win	(Turkey) Ünal Alkayış	Senshi 12	Varna, Bulgaria	KO (left hook)	2	0:30
2022-06-24	Win	(Turkey) Burak Ünal	Dynamite Fighting Show 15	Buzău, Romania	KO (liver shot)	2	3:00
2022-05-31	Loss	(France) Cyril Benzaquen	Kickboxing Prestige	Paris, France	Decision (unanimous)	5	3:00
For the ISKA World Light Heavyweight Championship. The International Sport Karate Association commission denied Lambagiu’s appeal, but ordered a rematch within twelve months.
2022-05-06	Win	(Portugal) Bassó Pires	Dynamite Fighting Show 14	Bucharest, Romania	TKO (towel thrown)	4	1:54
2022-02-26	Win	(Iran) Ehsan Sajed	Senshi 11	Varna, Bulgaria	TKO (referee stoppage)	2	2:24
2021-12-15	Loss	(Romania) Constantin Rusu	Dynamite Fighting Show 13	Bucharest, Romania	Decision (unanimous)	3	3:00
2021-09-22	Win	(Romania) Andrei Ostrovanu	Dynamite Fighting Show 12	Baia Mare, Romania	Decision (unanimous)	3	3:00
2021-07-10	Win	(Russia) Andrei Chekhonin	Senshi 9	Varna, Bulgaria	Extra round decision (split)	4	3:00
Won the KWU Middleweight Championship.
2021-06-04	Win	(Greece) Petros Vardakas	Dynamite Fighting Show 11	Bucharest, Romania	Decision (unanimous)	3	3:00
2021-03-10	Win	(Romania) Ion Grigore	Dynamite Fighting Show 10	Bucharest, Romania	Decision (split)	3	3:00
2019-11-21	Win	(Romania) Anatoli Ciumac	Dynamite Fighting Show 6: David vs. Goliath	Iași, Romania	Decision (unanimous)	3	3:00
2019-09-27	Win	(Switzerland) Daniel Stefanovski	Dynamite Fighting Show 5: Team Moroșanu vs. Team Bonjasky	Piatra Neamț, Romania	Decision (unanimous)	3	3:00
2019-06-06	Win	(Romania) Flavius Boiciuc	Dynamite Fighting Show 4, Final	Cluj-Napoca, Romania	KO (left hook)	1	2:57
Won the Dynamite Fighting Show 4 Welterweight Tournament.
2019-06-06	Win	(Romania) Claudiu Bădoi	Dynamite Fighting Show 4, Semi Final	Cluj-Napoca, Romania	Decision (unanimous)	3	3:00
2019-05-01	Draw	(Ukraine) Artur Kyshenko	MAS Fight Ling Shan Grand Prix	Sichuan, China	Draw	1	3:00
2018-10-19	Win	(Romania) Alexandru Radnev	Dynamite Fighting Show 2	Piatra Neamț, Romania	Decision (unanimous)	3	3:00
2018-04-20	Loss	(Romania) Flavius Boiciuc	Colosseum Tournament 6	Iași, Romania	Decision (unanimous)	3	3:00
2017-10-16	Win	(Romania) Mirel Drăgan	Colosseum Tournament 4	Bucharest, Romania	TKO (three knockdowns)	1	1:51
Defended the Colosseum Tournament World Light Welterweight Championship.
2017-06-17	Win	(Romania) Cristian Stoica	Colosseum Tournament 2	Ploiești, Romania	KO (left hook)	4	1:01
Won the inaugural Colosseum Tournament World Light Welterweight Championship.
2016-10-01	Win	(Moldova) Denis Teleshman	KOK Hero’s Series	Chișinău, Moldova	Decision (unanimous)	3	3:00
2016-08-??	Win	(Romania) Izidor Bunea	World Mixed Fights	Bucharest, Romania	Decision (split)	3	3:00
Legend: Win Loss Draw/No contest Notes

== Mixed martial arts record ==
Professional record breakdown
7 matches	2 wins	5 losses
By knockout	1	0
By submission	0	0
By decision	1	5
Draws	0	
No contests	0	

Florin Lambagiu mixed martial arts record
Res.	Record	Opponent	Method	Event	Date	Round	Time	Location	Notes
Loss	2–5	Anatoli Ciumac	Decision (Split)	Dynamite Fighting Show 7 – DFS 7	5 March 2020	3	5:00		
Loss	2–4	Jean Petrick	Decision (Split)	RXF 29 – MMA All Stars 5: RXF vs. Magnum FC	18 December 2017	3	5:00		
Win	2–3	Peter Guzsvan	Decision (Unanimous)	RXF 27 – Next Fighter	29 July 2017	3	5:00		
Loss	1–3	Nemanja Nikolic	Decision (Unanimous)	SBC 12 – Serbian Battle Championship 12	18 February 2017	3	5:00		
Loss	1–2	Vasile Bostan	Decision (Unanimous)	Eagles FC 3 – Eagles Fighting Championship 3	19 November 2016	3	5:00		
Loss	1–1	Ion Surdu	Decision (Unanimous)	RMMAF Series 12 – Divizia MMA: Pascu vs. Markovic	31 October 2016	3	5:00		
Win	1–0	George Petcovici	TKO (Punches)	BCT – Black Cage Tournament 3	11 July 2015	1	4:58		

== See also ==
- List of male kickboxers
