= Ștefan Orza =

Romanian kickboxer

- Born: Ștefan Răzvan Orza; April 12, 2001 (age 25); Moșneni, Romania
- Other names: The Diamond
- Height: 1.77 m (5 ft 9 1/2 in)
- Weight: 75 kg (165 lb; 11.8 st)
- Division: Light Heavyweight
- Fighting out of: Constanța, Romania
- Team: Sharks Gym
- Trainer: Daniel Asaftei
- Years active: 2017 – present

Kickboxing record
- Total: 26
- Wins: 24
- By knockout: 9
- Losses: 2
- By knockout: 1
- Draws: 0
- Last updated on: December 15, 2023

Ștefan Răzvan Orza (born 12 April 2001) is a Romanian professional kickboxer and kempo practitioner, and former freestyle wrestler and mixed martial artist. He currently competes in the Welterweight division for Glory.

A professional competitor since 2017, Orza formerly competed in the Colosseum Tournament, in which he was the reigning champion of the welterweight division. A one-time Kempo World Champion, he has a background in the disciplines of kenpō, mixed martial arts, freestyle wrestling and freestyle kickboxing.

As of 1 November 2022, Orza is ranked the #10 welterweight in the world by Beyond Kickboxing.

== Professional kickboxing career ==
=== Early career ===
Orza began his professional fighting career in 2017, making his debut in Constanța-based Urban Legend. From 2019 he fought in parallel in OSS Fighters, later signing with the popular Dynamite Fighting Show in 2022. He debuted for the promotion against the former Colosseum Tournament World Super Lightweight Champion Andrei Ostrovanu, winning via unanimous decision. He amassed a perfect 15–0 record prior to joining the rival promotion Colosseum Tournament.

=== Colosseum Tournament ===
In July 2022, it was announced that Orza would be participating in the Colosseum Tournament Welterweight Contender Tournament. He was scheduled to face former Colosseum Tournament welterweight title challenger Anghel Cardoş in the semifinal round at Colosseum Tournament 34 on August 18. Orza won the bout via unanimous decision. In the finals of the Colosseum Tournament Welterweight Contender Tournament later that night, Orza won a unanimous decision over Mădălin Crăciunică.

Orza faced Alexandru Amariței for the Colosseum Tournament World Welterweight Championship on 21 October 2022, in the main event of Colosseum Tournament 36. In a largely one-sided affair, Orza won the fight via unanimous decision.

Orza amassed a record of 18–0 prior to joining Glory.

=== GLORY ===
Orza made his promotional debut on 11 March 2023 at GLORY 84. He lost to Chico Kwasi by TKO.

== Personal life ==
His father was a fireman and Ștefan aspired to be a firefighter. Therefore, as of January 2021, he works as a firefighter at the Neptun Department in addition to his fighting career.

== Championships and accomplishments ==
=== Kickboxing ===
- Colosseum Tournament
  - Colosseum Tournament World Welterweight Championship (One time)
  - 2022 Colosseum Tournament Welterweight Contender Tournament Winner
- Dynamite Fighting Show
  - DFS Season Six Super Middleweight Tournament Runner-up
  - 2023 Fight of the Year vs. Eduard Gafencu at DFS 20
- Kickboxing Romania Awards
  - 2023 Fighting Spirit of the Year

=== Kempo ===
- Romanian Kempo Federation
  - 2019 FRK Romanian Senior Semi-Kempo and Full-Kempo Cup in Bucharest Full-Kempo Rules (gold) −70.0 kg
- United World Sport Kempo Federation
  - 2019 UWSKF World Junior Kempo Championship in Budapest, Hungary Full-Kempo Rules (gold) −71.0 kg
  - 2019 UWSKF World Junior Kempo Championship in Budapest, Hungary Knock-down Rules (gold) −71.0 kg
- International Kempo Federation
  - 2024 IKF World Senior Kempo Championships in Antalya, Turkey Full-Contact Rules (gold) −75.0 kg
  - 2024 IKF World Senior Kempo Championships in Antalya, Turkey Submission Rules (bronze) −75.0 kg
  - 2017 IKF European Junior Kempo Championships in Bucharest, Romania Full-Kempo Rules (gold) −65.0 kg

=== Freestyle wrestling ===
- Romanian Wrestling Federation
  - 2018 FRL Romania Cadet Beach Wrestling National Championships in Constanța-Mangalia (gold) −70.0 kg
  - 2016 International Beach Wrestling Tournament Ion Cornianu & Ladislau Simon in Bucharest, Romania (gold)

=== Freestyle kickboxing ===
- World Kickboxing Association
  - 2016 FRFK European WKA-WTKA Boys Championship in Bucharest, Romania Freestyle K-1 Light (gold) −50.0 kg

=== Mixed martial arts ===
- Romanian Kempo Federation
  - 2019 FRK Romania Junior National Grappling UWW and MMA Championships in Bucharest MMA Rules (bronze) −70.0 kg

== Professional kickboxing record ==
Kickboxing record
23 wins (9 KOs), 2 losses (1 KO), 0 draws
| Date | Result | Opponent | Event | Location | Method | Round | Time | Record |
| 2025-10-17 | Win | (Romania) Bogdan Slabu | EFC 1 | Constanta, Romania | Decision (unanimous) | 3 | 3:00 | 24-2-0 |
| 2025-07-02 | Win | (Georgia (country)) Levan Guruli | Colosseum Tournament 46 | Suceava, Romania | Decision (unanimous) | 3 | 3:00 | 23-2-0 |
| 2024-06-13 | Win | (Greece) Dionisis Serifi | K-1 Fighting Network Romania 2024 | Galați, Romania | KO (punches) | 1 | 2:12 | 22-2-0 |
| 2023-12-15 | Loss | (Romania) Florin Lambagiu | Dynamite Fighting Show 21 - Welterweight Championship Tournament, Final | Galați, Romania | Ext. R decision (unanimous) | 4 | 3:00 | 21-2-0 |
For the inaugural DFS Welterweight Championship.
| 2023-09-22 | Win | (Romania) Eduard Gafencu | Dynamite Fighting Show 20 - Welterweight Championship Tournament, Semi Finals | Bucharest, Romania | Decision (unanimous) | 3 | 3:00 | 21-1-0 |
| 2023-05-13 | Win | (Romania) Cezar Buzdugan | Dynamite Fighting Show 19 - Welterweight Championship Tournament, Quarter Finals | Buzău, Romania | Decision (unanimous) | 3 | 3:00 | 20-1-0 |
| 2023-03-11 | Loss | (Netherlands) Chico Kwasi | GLORY 84 | Rotterdam, Netherlands | TKO (knee) | 2 | 3:00 | 19-1-0 |
| 2022-10-21 | Win | (Romania) Alexandru Amariței | Colosseum Tournament 36 | Botoșani, Romania | Decision (unanimous) | 5 | 3:00 | 19-0-0 |
Won the Colosseum Tournament World Welterweight Championship.
| 2022-08-18 | Win | (Romania) Mădălin Crăciunică | Colosseum Tournament 34 - Welterweight Contender Tournament, Final | Brașov, Romania | Decision (unanimous) | 3 | 3:00 | 18-0-0 |
Colosseum Tournament World Welterweight Championship Eliminator.
| 2022-08-18 | Win | (Romania) Anghel Cardoş | Colosseum Tournament 34 - Welterweight Contender Tournament, Semi Finals | Brașov, Romania | Decision (unanimous) | 3 | 3:00 | 17-0-0 |
| 2022-05-06 | Win | (Romania) Andrei Ostrovanu | Dynamite Fighting Show 14 | Bucharest, Romania | Decision (unanimous) | 3 | 3:00 | 16-0-0 |
| 2021-11-19 | Win | (Romania) Cezar Buzdugan | OSS Fighters 07 | Constanța, Romania | Decision (unanimous) | 3 | 3:00 | 15-0-0 |
| 2021-07-16 | Win | (Moldova) Valentin Pascali | OSS Fighters 06 | Constanța, Romania | KO (punches and knee) | 2 | 2:57 | 14-0-0 |
| 2020-02-07 | Win | (Moldova) Serghei Zanosiev | OSS Fighters 5 | Bucharest, Romania | Decision (unanimous) | 3 | 3:00 | 13-0-0 |
| 2019-12-15 | Win | (Romania) Costel Răşcanu | Urban Legend 9 | Constanța, Romania | KO (knee and punch) | 1 | 1:00 | 12-0-0 |
| 2019-10-05 | Win | (Romania) Răzvan Vătavu | Urban Legend 8 | Constanța, Romania | KO (punch and knee) | 1 | 1:38 | 11-0-0 |
| 2019-08-22 | Win | (Romania) Călin Petrișor | OSS Fighters 4 | Mamaia, Romania | Decision (unanimous) | 3 | 3:00 | 10-0-0 |
| 2019-05-25 | Win | (Romania) Ionuţ Laszlo | Urban Legend 7: Romania vs. Netherlands | Constanța, Romania | KO (punches) | 2 | 1:41 | 9-0-0 |
| 2019-02-28 | Win | (Romania) Florin Pîrtea | OSS Fighters 3 | Bucharest, Romania | Decision (unanimous) | 3 | 3:00 | 8-0-0 |
| 2018-12-16 | Win | (Romania) Daniel Loghin | Urban Legend 6 | Constanța, Romania | KO (punches and knee) | 1 | 2:11 | 7-0-0 |
| 2018-09-30 | Win | (Romania) Marius Calara | Urban Legend 5 | Constanța, Romania | TKO (referee stoppage) | 2 | 0:28 | 6-0-0 |
| 2018-05-27 | Win | (Romania) Ciprian Piroteală | Urban Legend 4 | Constanța, Romania | KO (high kick and punch) | 1 | 1:43 | 5-0-0 |
| 2017-12-10 | Win | (Moldova) Dragoş Burlacu | Urban Legend 3 | Constanța, Romania | KO (left hook) | 2 | 1:42 | 4-0-0 |
| 2017-08-24 | Win | (Romania) Alexandru Moisescu | Urban Legend 2 | Mamaia, Romania | Decision (unanimous) | 3 | 3:00 | 3-0-0 |
Legend: Win Loss Draw/No contest Notes

== See also ==
- List of male kickboxers
