= Călin Petrișor =

Romanian professional kickboxer and kempo practitioner

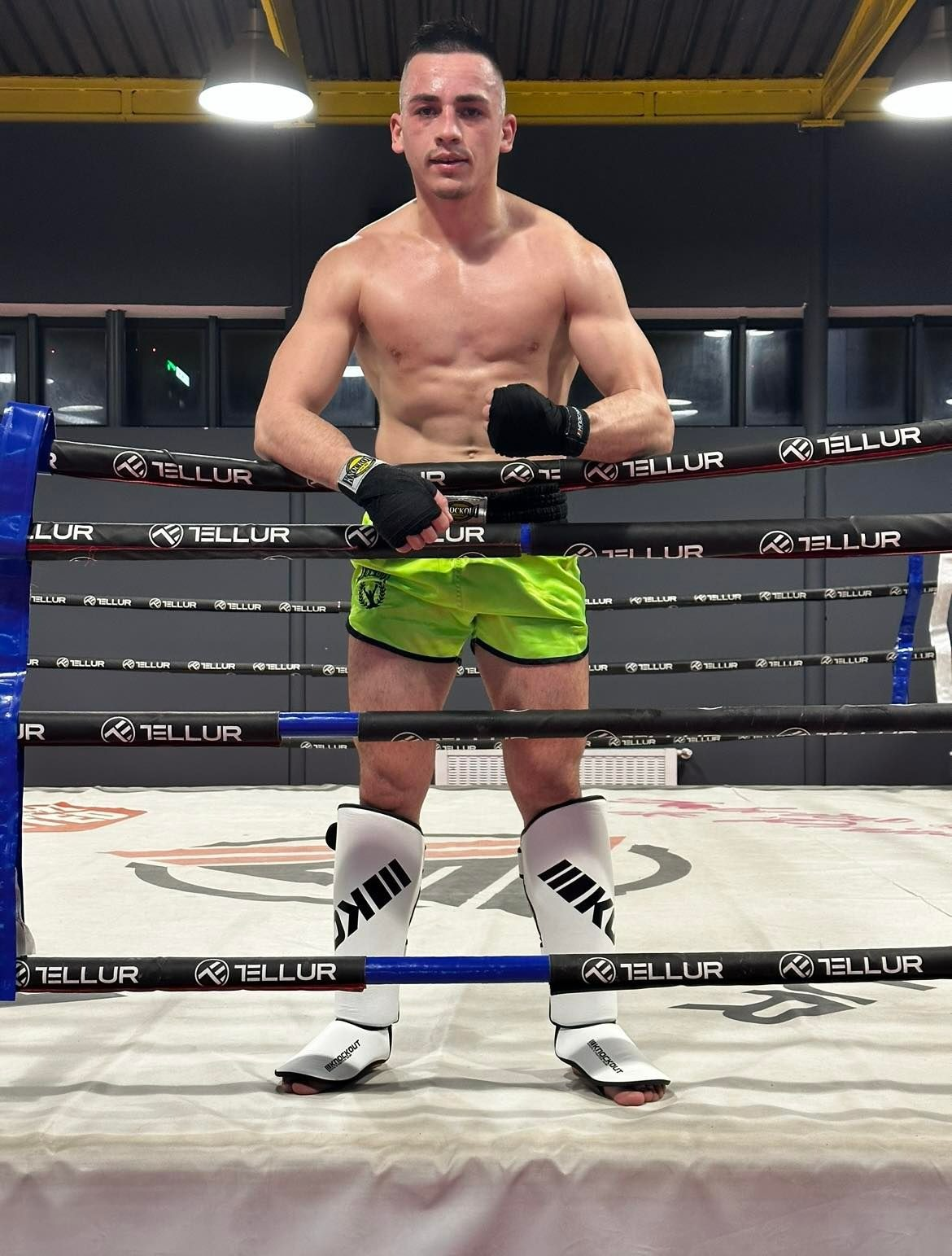
- Born: Călin Alin Petrișor; June 24, 1998 (age 28); Găești, Romania
- Other names: KO Hunter
- Nationality: Romanian
- Height: 1.73 m (5 ft 8 in)
- Weight: 70 kg (150 lb; 11 st)
- Division: Super Welterweight; Welterweight
- Fighting out of: Găești, Romania
- Team: Respect Gym
- Trainer: Daniel Mocanu
- Years active: 2015–present

Kickboxing record
- Total: 55
- Wins: 42
- By knockout: 17
- Losses: 13
- Draws: 0

Călin Alin Petrișor (born 24 June 1998) is a Romanian professional kickboxer and kempo practitioner. He currently competes in the Lightweight division for Dynamite Fighting Show (DFS).

A professional kickboxing competitor since 2015, Petrișor has also competed for Superkombat Fighting Championship, Colosseum Tournament, FEA and OSS Fighters.

== Personal life ==
Petrișor is a Sergeant. He graduated from the Military School of Foremen and Non-Commissioned Officers of the Romanian Land Forces in Pitești. In 2021 Petrișor was awarded the Plaque of Honour by the Association of Military Veterans and Disabled Veterans (AMVVD). His coach Daniel Mocanu is a traffic policeman.

== Championships and accomplishments ==
=== Kickboxing ===
- International Sport Karate Association
  - 2023 ISKA World Super Welterweight Oriental Rules Championship
  - 2023 ISKA European Light Welterweight Championship
- Fighting Entertainment Association
  - 2023 FEA Lightweight Grand Prix Tournament Winner
- Dynamite Fighting Show
  - 2022 Rising Star
  - 2021 Fight of the Year vs. Serghei Zanosiev
  - Performance of the Night vs. Vlad Trif
- Confruntarea Titanilor
  - Confruntarea Titanilor Featherweight Championship
- Ultimate Fighting Tournament
  - 2019 Knockout of the Year vs. Anton Amir
- Kickboxing Romania Awards
  - 2024 Fight of the Year vs. Valentin Mavrodin 2

=== Kempo ===
- Romanian Kempo Federation
  - 2022 Romania National Kempo Championship K1 Rules (gold) −70.0 kg
  - 2022 Romanian Kempo Cup K1 Rules (gold) −70.0 kg

== Professional kickboxing record ==
Kickboxing record
42 wins (17 KOs), 13 losses, 0 draws
Date	Result	Opponent	Event	Location	Method	Round	Time
2027-02-13		(Italy) Angelo Volpe	Elite Top Fight: The History of Fight a Genova	Genoa, Italy			
For the vacant ETF Super Welterweight(-70 kg) title.
2026-10-16	Win	(Hungary) Mátyás Borsodi	Road to DFS 9	Târgoviște, Romania	Decision (unanimous)	3	3:00
2026-04-03	Loss	(Moldova) Vitalie Matei	K-1 World MAX 2026 in Bucharest, Quarterfinals	Bucharest, Romania	Decision (unanimous)	3	3:00
2025-12-12	Win	(Moldova) Vitalie Matei	DFS 29	Timișoara, Romania	Decision (unanimous)	3	3:00
2025-10-24	Loss	(Greece) Achilleas Karapiperis	DFS 28	Pitești, Romania	Decision (unanimous)	3	3:00
2025-06-27	Win	(Morocco) Bilal Abdelouahab	Road to DFS 7	Târgoviște, Romania	Decision (unanimous)	3	3:00
2024-10-11	Loss	(Romania) Valentin Mavrodin	DFS 24	Târgu Jiu, Romania	Decision (unanimous)	5	3:00
Lost the ISKA World Super Welterweight Oriental Rules Championship and for the DFS Middleweight Championship.
2024-06-29	Win	(Portugal) Rudi Mendes	Oktagon Tsunami	Rome, Italy	KO (punches and knee)	4	0:40
Defended the ISKA World Super Welterweight Oriental Rules Championship.
2024-06-07	Win	(Romania) Alex Bublea	DFS 23	Bistrița, Romania	Decision (unanimous)	3	3:00
2024-04-26	Win	(Spain) David Navarro	Road to DFS 3	Târgoviște, Romania	KO (liver kick)	1	1:26
2024-02-25	Loss	(Poland) Kacper Muszyński	Iron Fighter 24	Pordenone, Italy	Decision (split)	3	3:00
2023-12-15	Loss	(Romania) Valentin Mavrodin	DFS 21	Galați, Romania	Decision (unanimous)	3	3:00
2023-11-18	Win	(Ukraine) Taras Hnatchuk	Oktagon 2023	Turin, Italy	KO (right hook)	1	2:10
Won the ISKA World Super Welterweight Oriental Rules Championship.
2023-09-23	Loss	(Moldova) Vitalie Matei	FEA: Equinox	Chișinău, Moldova	Decision (split)	5	3:00
For the vacant FEA World Lightweight Championship.
2023-06-03	Win	(Greece) Panagiotis Mitsinigkos	Road to DFS 2	Târgoviște, Romania	TKO (punches)	4	2:25
Won the ISKA European Light Welterweight Championship.
2023-05-13	Win	(Italy) Sheriff Konteh	DFS 19	Buzău, Romania	Decision (unanimous)	3	3:00
2023-04-08	Win	(Moldova) Vitalie Panainte	FEA: Take Off - Lightweight Grand Prix Tournament, Final	Chișinău, Moldova	TKO (three knockdowns)	2	2:56
FEA World Lightweight Championship Eliminator.
2023-04-08	Win	(Turkey) Samet Erdemir	FEA: Take Off - Lightweight Grand Prix Tournament, Semi Finals	Chișinău, Moldova	Decision (unanimous)	3	3:00
2023-03-25	Loss	(France) Edouard Bernadou	Kick's Night 2023	Toulouse, France	Decision (unanimous)	5	3:00
For the ISKA World Welterweight Championship. The International Sport Karate Association commission denied Petrișor’s appeal.
2022-12-08	Win	(Netherlands) Said Malek	DFS 17	Constanța, Romania	Decision (unanimous)	3	3:00
2022-07-22	Win	(Bosnia and Herzegovina) Čedo Pantić	Confruntarea Titanilor 24	Târgoviște, Romania	Decision (split)	3	3:00
2022-05-06	Win	(France) Mitch Farel	DFS 14	Bucharest, Romania	Decision (unanimous)	3	3:00
2021-12-15	Loss	(Romania) Ionuț Popa	DFS 13 - Lightweight Championship Tournament, Semi Finals	Bucharest, Romania	Decision (split)	3	3:00
2021-09-22	Win	(Romania) Vlad Trif	DFS 12	Baia Mare, Romania	Decision (split)	3	3:00
2021-03-10	Win	(Moldova) Serghei Zanosiev	DFS 10	Bucharest, Romania	TKO (doctor stoppage)	4	0:22
2020-12-04	Win	(Romania) Daniel Corbeanu	DFS 9	Cluj-Napoca, Romania	TKO (three knockdowns)	3	2:02
2020-08-20	Win	(Romania) Daniel Corbeanu	DFS 8	Bucharest, Romania	TKO (towel thrown)	3	0:54
2019-12-28	Win	(Romania) Ionuț Ciungu	Liga Spartanilor 1	Slatina, Romania	Decision (unanimous)	3	3:00
2019-12-07	Win	(Romania) Mihai Pîrgaru	Mix Kombat 5	Bistrița, Romania	Decision (unanimous)	3	3:00
2019-10-26	Win	(Romania) Amir Anton	Ultimate Fighting Tournament 8	Cluj-Napoca, Romania	KO (high kick)	1	2:38
2019-08-22	Loss	(Romania) Ștefan Orza	OSS Fighters 4	Mamaia, Romania	Decision (unanimous)	3	3:00
2019-03-29	Win	(Romania) Alexandru Cuciureanu	Colosseum Tournament 11	Bucharest, Romania	TKO (towel thrown)	2	1:10
2018-12-14	Loss	(Romania) Daniel Corbeanu	DFS 3	Craiova, Romania	Decision (unanimous)	3	3:00
2018-11-02	Win	(Romania) Cosmin Mărcuță	SAS Gym 1	Bucharest, Romania	Decision (unanimous)	3	3:00
2018-10-08	Loss	(Romania) Mădălin Crăciunică	APP Fight Night 1 - Super Featherweight Tournament, Final	Brașov, Romania	TKO (doctor stoppage/cut)	1	3:00
2018-10-08	Win	(Romania) Vlad Trif	APP Fight Night 1 - Super Featherweight Tournament, Semi Finals	Brașov, Romania	Decision (unanimous)	3	3:00
2018-07-13	Loss	(Russia) Tamerlan Bashirov	ACB KB 16	Sibiu, Romania	Decision (unanimous)	3	3:00
2017-11-25	Win	(Romania) Cosmin Mărcuță	Confruntarea Titanilor	Titu, Romania	Decision	3	3:00
Originally ruled a Split Decision victory for Mărcuță, result overturned after fight was rescored.
2017-10-28	Win	(Romania) Marian Șerban	WKA Fighters League	Drobeta-Turnu Severin, Romania	KO (jumping knee and punches)	1	2:57
2017-09-17	Win	(Romania) Ștefan Irimia	Superkombat Expo	Bucharest, Romania	Decision (unanimous)	3	3:00
2017-04-28	Win	(Romania) David Crăciun	Confruntarea Titanilor	Târgoviște, Romania	Decision (unanimous)	3	3:00
2017-04-01	Win	(Romania) Vlad Trif	Spune NU Drogurilor	Craiova, Romania	Decision (unanimous)	3	3:00
2017-02-17	Win	(Romania) David Constantin	Kombat Academy	Pitești, Romania	Decision (unanimous)	3	3:00
2016-11-26	Loss	(Romania) Mihai Tudorie	Colosseum Tournament 1	Ploiești, Romania	Decision (split)	3	3:00
2016-09-09	Win	(Romania) Daniel Dragomir	Respect World Series 3	Pitești, Romania	KO (body kick)	2	1:03
2016-07-16	Win	(Romania) Alexandru Vlaicu	Blood & Honour Tournament	Ploiești, Romania	KO	1	1:47
2016-05-14	Win	(Romania) Bogdan Suru	Confruntarea Titanilor	Găești, Romania	Decision (unanimous)	3	3:00
2016-12-20	Win	(Romania) Mădălin Chirovan	Provocarea Marilor Orașe	Râmnicu Vâlcea, Romania	KO	2	0:56
Legend: Win Loss Draw/No contest Notes

== See also ==
- List of male kickboxers
