= Eduard Gafencu =

Romanian kickboxer and professional boxer

- Born: February 9, 1993 (age 33); Arad, Romania
- Other names: The Blitz
- Height: 1.78 m (5 ft 10 in)
- Weight: 77 kg (170 lb; 12.1 st)
- Division: Super middleweight Light heavyweight
- Fighting out of: Arad, Romania
- Team: Blitz Team (2021–present)
- Years active: 2017–present

Professional boxing record
- Total: 3
- Wins: 3
- By knockout: 2
- Losses: 0
- Draws: 0

Kickboxing record
- Total: 24
- Wins: 17
- By knockout: 12
- Losses: 7
- By knockout: 2
- Draws: 0

Other information
- Boxing record from BoxRec
- Last updated on: June 13, 2024

Eduard Gafencu (born February 9, 1993) is a Romanian kickboxer and former boxer. He currently competes in the Welterweight division for Glory. Gafencu is the first fighter to become a two-division Colosseum Tournament champion, holding titles in two weight classes simultaneously. He has also competed for Dynamite Fighting Show (DFS).

As of 18 August 2020, he is the #14 ranked welterweight in the world, according to the International Professional Combat Council (IPCC).

== Early life ==
Gafencu played soccer from 7 to 14 years old, but quit after an injury. He also practiced swimming. Gafencu then started boxing at the age of 15, but after a short while he switched to kickboxing. At the age of 16 and a half, he had his first fight and practiced kickboxing until the age of 21, culminating in a three-year hiatus.

== Professional kickboxing career ==
Gafencu entered the professional circuit in 2017, after being initiated by the coach Gabriel Moț from Top Fighters Club and taken over from Arnold Nagy (Metalbox) by the Ruben Stoia Boxing Club.

=== Colosseum Tournament ===
Gafencu competed for various regional Romanian promotions, in the process amassing a record of 6–0.

In 2018, Gafencu had signed a contract with the Colosseum Tournament. He took part in a four-man super welterweight tournament to determine the Colosseum Tournament's first Colosseum Tournament World Super Welterweight Champion.

Gafencu faced Adrian Cibu on September 17, 2018, in the semi-final of the Super Welterweight Tournament. He won the fight in emphatic fashion via knockout in round one to progress to the final round of the tournament. Gafencu faced Leonard Dorin's student Adelin Mihăilă at Colosseum Tournament 8 in the finals. Gafencu won the match via knockout in the third round. The triumph also earned Gafencu his first Performance of the Night award.

Gafencu faced Flavius Boiciuc on December 14, 2018, at Colosseum Tournament 10. He won the fight via unanimous decision.

Gafencu faced the Fight Institute by Peter Aerts's Thomas Doeve on March 29, 2019, at Colosseum Tournament 11. He won the fight via knockout in round one. This win earned him his second Performance of the Night award. The tornado kick knockout has been also acknowledged by sites like Sherdog, MMA Fighting, MMAjunkie.com and others as the potential Knockout of the Year for 2019.

Gafencu moved down to the welterweight division. He faced the Bonjasky Academy's Ekrem Doruk for the inaugural Colosseum Tournament World Welterweight Championship on May 9, 2019, in the main event of Colosseum Tournament 12. He won the fight via knockout in the second round, becoming the first Colosseum Tournament fighter to win titles in two weight classes. This win earned him the Performance of the Night award for a third time.

=== Dynamite Fighting Show ===
On January 23, 2020, it was announced that Gafencu had signed a deal with Dynamite Fighting Show.

In his debut fight for the promotion, Gafencu faced the Hemmers Gym's Benjamin Masudi on March 5, 2020, at Dynamite Fighting Show 7. Eduard Gafencu knocked down Masudi twice in the fight. He won the fight via unanimous decision.

=== Return to Colosseum Tournament ===
In September 2020, it was announced that Gafencu signed a deal to return to the Colosseum Tournament.

In his return bout, Gafencu was expected to face Adelin Mihăilă in rematch on October 23, 2020, at Colosseum Tournament 20. However, on October 6, it was announced that Mihăilă pulled out due to his COVID-19 recovery, and he was replaced by Alexandru Ianţoc. Gafencu won the fight via knockout in the second round.

Gafencu faced Anghel Cardoş in a 3-round non-title on February 26, 2021, at Colosseum Tournament 23. He lost the fight via decision. The result was seen as highly controversial.

Following his first professional loss, Gafencu returned to face Flavius Boiciuc at Colosseum Tournament 25. He won the fight by unanimous decision.

== Fighting style ==
In 2019, Gafencu earned public praise from Romanian legend Daniel Ghiță for his ring performances. He was described by Ghiță as "a highly talented kickboxer".

He has a son, who was born in 2017.

== Championships and accomplishments ==
=== Kickboxing ===
- Colosseum Tournament
  - Colosseum Tournament World Welterweight Championship (one, inaugural)
  - Colosseum Tournament World Super Welterweight Championship (one, inaugural)
  - Colosseum Tournament World Super Welterweight Championship Tournament Winner
  - Performance of the Night (four times) vs. Adrian Cibu & Adelin Mihăilă, Thomas Doeve, Ekrem Doruk and Anghel Cardoş
  - First multi-divisional champion in Colosseum Tournament history
- Dynamite Fighting Show
  - 2023 Comeback of the Year
  - 2023 Fight of the Year vs. Ștefan Orza at DFS 20
  - Fight of the Night (one time) vs. Benjamin Masudi
- Russia Today
  - 2019 Knockout of the Year vs. Thomas Doeve

== Kickboxing record ==
Kickboxing record
17 wins (12 KOs), 7 losses (2 KO), 0 draws
Date	Result	Opponent	Event	Location	Method	Round	Time	Record
2024-06-13	Loss	(Romania) Alexandru Amariței	K-1 Fighting Network Romania 2024	Galați, Romania	TKO (leg injury)	1	2:58	17-7
2023-10-07	Loss	(Bulgaria) Teodor Hristov	Glory 89	Burgas, Bulgaria	Decision (unanimous)	3	3:00	17-6
2023-09-22	Loss	(Romania) Ștefan Orza	Dynamite Fighting Show 20 - Welterweight Championship Tournament, Semi Finals	Bucharest, Romania	Decision (unanimous)	3	3:00	17-5
2023-06-17	Loss	(France) Diaguely Camara	Glory: Collision 5	Rotterdam, Netherlands	TKO (knee)	2	2:24	17-4
2023-03-12	Win	(Romania) Mădălin Crăciunică	DFS 18 - Welterweight Championship Tournament, Quarter Finals	Timișoara, Romania	TKO (three knockdowns)	1	2:50	17-3
2022-08-18	Loss	(Romania) Alexandru Amariței	Colosseum Tournament 34	Brașov, Romania	Decision (unanimous)	5	3:00	16-3
Lost the Colosseum Tournament World Welterweight Championship.
2022-05-09	Win	(Romania) Robert Gontineac	Colosseum Tournament 31	Arad, Romania	TKO (towel thrown)	2	1:24	16-2
2022-04-08	Loss	(Sweden) Joakim Hägg	Colosseum Tournament 30	Malmö, Sweden	Decision (unanimous)	3	3:00	15-2
2021-09-20	Win	(Romania) Anghel Cardoş	Colosseum Tournament 27	Oradea, Romania	Decision (unanimous)	5	3:00	15-1
Defended the Colosseum Tournament World Welterweight Championship. Performance of the Night.
2021-05-31	Win	(Romania) Flavius Boiciuc	Colosseum Tournament 25	Cluj-Napoca, Romania	Decision (unanimous)	3	3:00	14-1
2021-02-26	Loss	(Romania) Anghel Cardoş	Colosseum Tournament 23	Bucharest, Romania	Decision (majority)	3	3:00	13-1
2020-10-23	Win	(Romania) Alexandru Ianţoc	Colosseum Tournament 20	Arad, Romania	KO (jumping knee)	2	2:25	13-0
2020-03-05	Win	(Belgium) Benjamin Masudi	DFS 7	Arad, Romania	Decision (unanimous)	3	3:00	12-0
2019-05-09	Win	(Netherlands) Ekrem Doruk	Colosseum Tournament 12	Arad, Romania	KO (jumping knee and punches)	2	2:13	11-0
Won the inaugural Colosseum Tournament World Welterweight Championship. Performance of the Night.
2019-03-29	Win	(Netherlands) Thomas Doeve	Colosseum Tournament 11	Bucharest, Romania	KO (tornado kick)	1	2:19	10-0
Performance of the Night.
2018-12-14	Win	(Romania) Flavius Boiciuc	Colosseum Tournament 10	Timișoara, Romania	Decision (unanimous)	3	3:00	9-0
2018-09-17	Win	(Romania) Adelin Mihăilă	Colosseum Tournament 8, Final	Bucharest, Romania	KO (right hook & double left hook)	3	0:22	8-0
Won the inaugural Colosseum Tournament World Super Welterweight Championship. Performance of the Night.
2018-09-17	Win	(Romania) Adrian Cibu	Colosseum Tournament 8, Semi-final	Bucharest, Romania	KO (flurry of punches)	1	2:57	7-0
Performance of the Night.
2018-01-28	Win	(Romania) Paul Crețiu	Fighters League 2	Reșița, Romania	Decision (unanimous)	3	3:00	6-0
Legend: Win Loss Draw/no contest Notes

== Professional boxing record ==
3 fights	3 wins	0 losses
By knockout	3	0
By decision	0	0

No.	Result	Record	Opponent	Type	Round, time	Date	Location	Notes
2	Win	2–0	(Moldova) Corneliu Lisii	TKO	4 (4)	28 June 2019	Sala Olimpia, Timișoara, Romania	
1	Win	1–0	(Hungary) Titusz Szabó	KO	1 (4), 2:18	17 November 2018	Sala Polivalentă, Arad, Romania	

== See also ==
- List of male kickboxers
