= Sebastian Cozmâncă =

Romanian Thai boxing practitioner and professional kickboxer

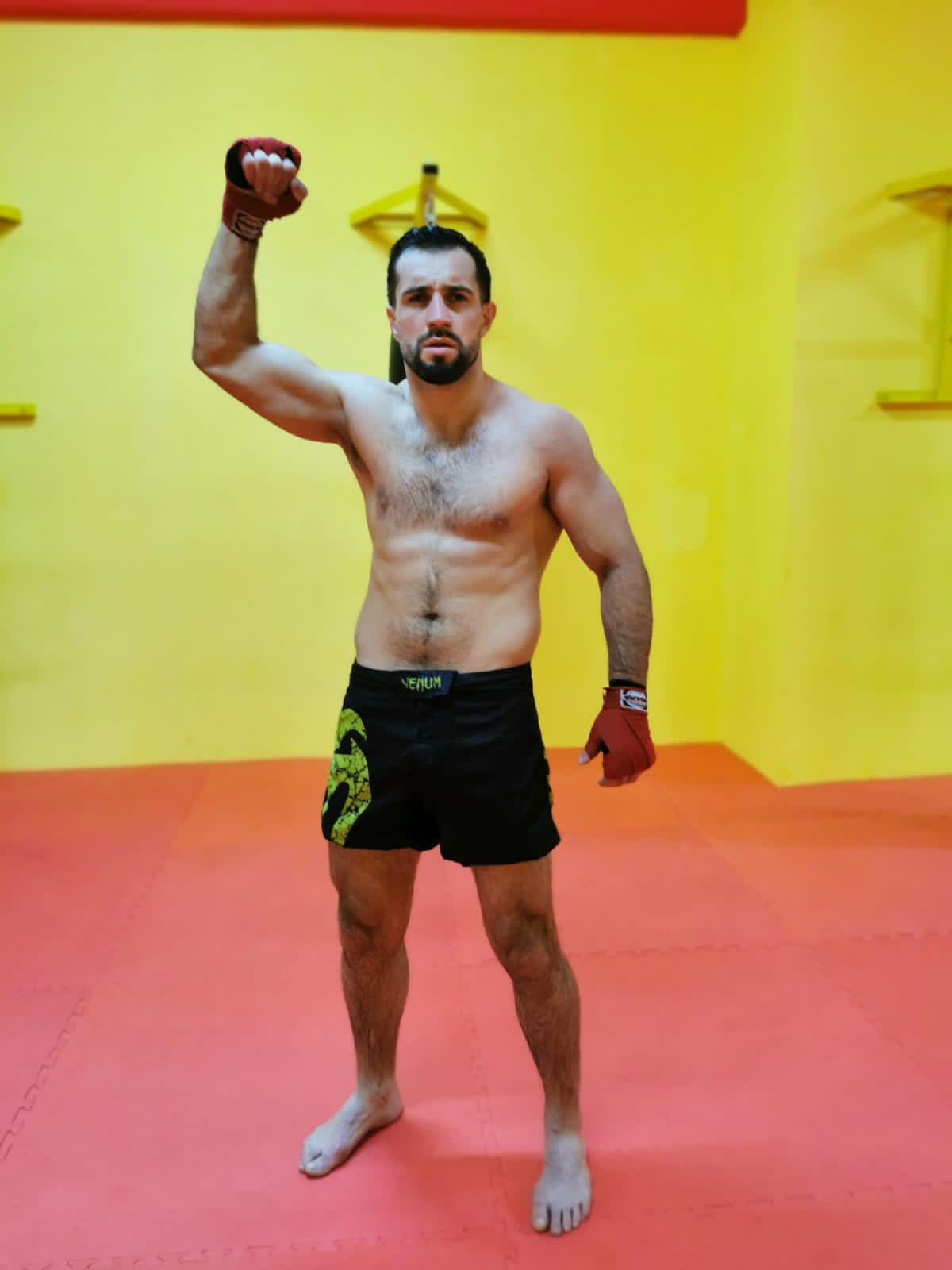
- Born: Sebastian Cosmin Cozmîncă; February 2, 1992 (age 34); Dorohoi, Romania
- Other names: Black Tiger; Burebista (former)
- Nationality: Romanian
- Height: 1.85 m (6 ft 1 in)
- Weight: 102 kg (225 lb; 16.1 st)
- Division: Heavyweight (2022–present); Cruiserweight
- Style: Kickboxing, Muay Thai
- Fighting out of: Iași, Romania
- Team: Scorpions Iași
- Trainer: Mihai Constantin

Kickboxing record
- Total: 27
- Wins: 22
- By knockout: 13
- Losses: 5
- By knockout: 0
- Draws: 0
- Last updated on: September 22, 2023

Sebastian Cosmin Cozmâncă (born February 2, 1992) is a Romanian Muay Thai kickboxer who competes in the heavyweight division. He is currently signed to the Dynamite Fighting Show. He formerly competed in the Superkombat Fighting Championship and the Colosseum Tournament. He was Cătălin Moroșanu's teammate and training partner.

In October 2022, Cozmâncă was ranked the #8 light-heavyweight kickboxer in the world by Beyond Kick. He was removed from the rankings by moving to the heavyweight division.

== Championships and awards ==
=== Kickboxing ===
- Dynamite Fighting Show
  - 2018 DFS Heavyweight Championship (one time)
- Colosseum Tournament
  - 2018 Colosseum Tournament World -95 kg/209 lb Championship (one time)
- GP Tracia
  - 2016 GP Tracia -95 kg/209 lb Championship (one time)
- World Muay Thai Federation
  - 2016 WMF European Championships Heavyweight gold medalist (gold)

== Professional kickboxing career ==
In 2015, Cozmâncă was signed by the Romanian Superkombat Fighting Championship promotion. In 2018, he won the Colosseum Tournament World -95 kg/209 lb Championship, holding title before vacating it to sign with Dynamite Fighting Show. In the same year, at Dynamite Fighting Show 2, he defeated Valentin Bordianu for the Dynamite Fighting Show Heavyweight Championship via second-round knockout.

== Kickboxing record ==
Kickboxing record
22 wins (13 KOs), 5 losses, 0 draws
Date	Result	Opponent	Event	Location	Method	Round	Time	Record
2023-09-22	Loss	(Romania) Ionuț Iancu	Dynamite Fighting Show 20 - Heavyweight Championship Tournament, Semi Finals	Bucharest, Romania	Decision (unanimous)	3	3:00	22-5
2023-05-13	Win	(Slovenia) Miran Fabjan	DFS 19	Buzău, Romania	Decision (unanimous)	3	3:00	22-4
2023-03-12	Win	(Romania) Ilie Brancu	Dynamite Fighting Show 18 - Heavyweight Championship Tournament, Quarter Finals	Timișoara, Romania	TKO (three knockdowns/low kicks)	1	2:58	21-4
2022-12-08	Loss	(Netherlands) Colin George	Dynamite Fighting Show 17	Constanța, Romania	Decision (unanimous)	3	3:00	20-4
2022-10-19	Win	(Portugal) Bruno Susano	Dynamite Fighting Show 16	Iași, Romania	Decision (unanimous)	3	3:00	20-3
2022-06-24	Win	(France) Freddy Kemayo	Dynamite Fighting Show 15	Buzău, Romania	Decision (unanimous)	3	3:00	19-3
2020-10-23	Win	(France) Anthony Burger	Colosseum Tournament 20	Arad, Romania	TKO (towel thrown)	1	1:40	18-3
2019-07-20	Win	(Netherlands) Tarik Cherkaoui	Colosseum Tournament 14	Fălticeni, Romania	KO (right hook)	1	2:05	17-3
2019-05-09	Win	(Morocco) Badr Ferdous	Colosseum Tournament 12	Arad, Romania	TKO (retirement)	2	3:00	16-3
2018-11-17	Win	(Ukraine) Yuri Gorbenko	Mix Kombat 4	Bistrița, Romania	KO (left hook)	1	0:55	15-3
2018-10-19	Win	(Romania) Valentin Bordianu	Dynamite Fighting Show 2	Piatra Neamț, Romania	KO (right hook)	2	2:17	14-3
Won the DFS Heavyweight Championship.
2018-07-05	Win	(Germany) Gordon Haupt	Dynamite Fighting Show 1	Bucharest, Romania	KO (right high kick)	1	1:34	13-3
2018-05-24	Win	(Romania) Marius Munteanu	Colosseum Tournament 7	Bucharest, Romania	TKO (towel thrown)	2	2:19	12-3
2018-04-20	Win	(Germany) Frederik Kretschmer	Colosseum Tournament 6	Iași, Romania	KO (right high kick)	1	2:57	11-3
Won the Colosseum Tournament World -95.5 kg/210 lb Championship.
2018-02-23	Win	(United States) Dustin Stoltzfus	Colosseum Tournament 5	Galați, Romania	KO (left hook)	1	1:26	10-3
2017-10-16	Win	(Moldova) Nicolai Garbuz	Colosseum Tournament 4	Bucharest, Romania	KO (left hook)	1	1:23	9-3
2017-03-12	Win	(Sweden) Simon Ogolla	SUPERKOMBAT New Heroes 10	Bucharest, Romania	Decision (unanimous)	3	3:00	8-3
2016-11-12	Win	(Spain) Damian García	Superkombat World Grand Prix	Bucharest, Romania	KO (right hook)	1	1:05	7-3
2016-10-01	Win	(Spain) David Trallero	Superkombat World Grand Prix	Iași, Romania	Decision (unanimous)	3	3:00	6-3
2016-07-30	Loss	(Turkey) Murat Aygün	Superkombat World Grand Prix	Mamaia, Romania	Extra round decision (unanimous)	4	3:00	5-3
2016-05-07	Loss	(Suriname) Clyde Brunswijk	Superkombat World Grand Prix	Bucharest, Romania	Decision (split)	3	3:00	5-2
2016-03-20	Win	(Romania) Ilie Brancu	GP Tracia 33	Cluj-Napoca, Romania	Decision	3	3:00	5-1
Won the GP Tracia -95.5 kg/210 lb Championship.
2016-02-19	Win	(Croatia) Tomislav Čikotić	Final Fight Championship 22	Athens, Greece	Decision (split)	3	3:00	4-1
2015-11-07	Win	(Romania) Cosmin Ionescu	Superkombat World Grand Prix 2015 Final	Bucharest, Romania	KO (left high kick)	1	N/A	3-1
2015-10-16	Win	(Romania) Cosmin Joltea	ACB KB 3: Grand Prix Final	Sibiu, Romania	Decision (unanimous)	3	3:00	2-1
2014-12-20	Loss	(Moldova) Pavel Voronin	KOK World GP 2014 in Chișinău	Chișinău, Moldova	Decision (unanimous)	3	3:00	1-1
Legend: Win Loss Draw/no contest Notes
