= Timeline of Bucharest =

Coordinates: 44.4325°N 26.103889°E

The following is a timeline of the history of the city of Bucharest, Romania.

== Before the 17th century ==
- 1459 – Bucharest chartered by Vlad III, Prince of Wallachia.
- 1475 - Fortress razed by Stephen the Great in anti-Ottoman campaign.
- 1559 – Old Court Church built by Mircea Ciobanul
- 1587 – Mărcuța Church built.
- 1589 – Lipscani (street) completed.
- 1594 – Ottoman creditors slaughtered.
- 1595 – Ottoman forces retreat and partially burn it.

== 17th century ==
- 1633 – Bucharest Bărăția (church) built.
- 1658 – Metropolitan Church consecrated.
- 1667 – Slobozia Church built.
- 1688 – Romanian-language Bucharest Bible published.
- 1692 – Podul Mogoșoaiei paved with wood.
- 1694 – Princely Academy of Bucharest founded.
- 1698 – Constantin Brâncoveanu, Prince of Wallachia changed the capital from Târgoviște to Bucharest.

== 18th century ==
- 1702 – Mogoşoaia Palace built near city.
- 1715 – Antim Monastery built.
- 1722 – Kretzulescu Church built.
- 1724 – Stavropoleos Church built.
- 1739 – Gabroveni Inn built.
- 1757 – Lutheran church established.
- 1769 – City taken by Russians.
- 1789 – City taken by Austrians.
- 1793 – Plague & Earthquiake.

== 19th century ==
- 1808 – Manuc's Inn built.
- 1812 – 28 May: City hosts signing of the Treaty of Bucharest (1812).
- 1813 – Plague.
- 1821 – Greek uprising.
- 1828 – City taken by Russians who handed it to the prince of Walachia in 1829.
- 1847
  - Great Fire of Bucharest.
  - Cișmigiu Gardens inaugurated.
- 1848
  - September: City occupied by Turkish forces.
  - October: City occupied by Russian forces.
- 1852
  - Grand Theatre inaugurated.
  - Casa Capșa confectionery in business.
- 1853
  - July: City temporarily occupied by Russians.
  - 8 August: Turks in power.
  - 6 September: Austrians in power.
- 1856 – Austrian occupation ends.
- 1857 – Street lighting installed.
- 1858 – Bellu cemetery in use.
- 1861 – City becomes capital of Romania.
- 1862 – Orphanage founded.
- 1863 – Music and Drama Conservatory established.
- 1864
  - University of Bucharest, Bucharest National University of Arts, School of Bridges and Roads, Mines and Architecture, and National Museum of Antiquities founded.
  - Barbu Vlădoianu becomes mayor.
- 1865 – Flooding of Bucharest
- 1866
  - Romanian Academy founded.
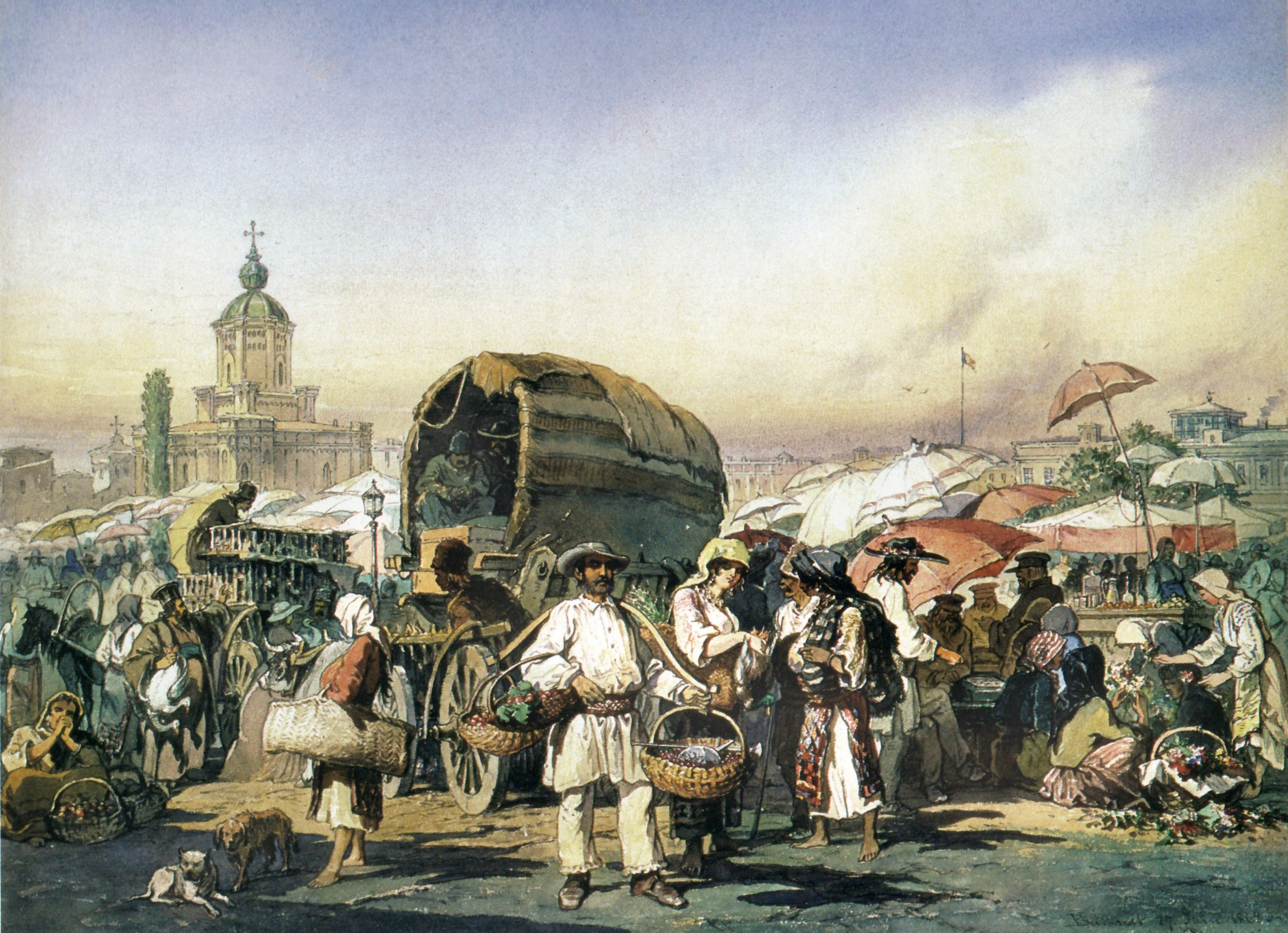
    Bucharest in 1868, by Amedeo Preziosi
  - Alexandru Ioan Cuza, first ruler of the Romanian Principalities, driven from his throne by an insurrection in Bucharest.
- 1867
  - Templul Coral (synagogue) built.
  - Population: 141,754.
- 1871 – Societatea Română de Tramvaiuri (tram society) established.
- 1872 – Gara Târgoviștei (railway station) built.
- 1880 – Bukarester Tagblatt German-language newspaper begins publication.
- 1881 – City becomes capital of Kingdom of Romania
- 1883
  - Roman Catholic Archdiocese of Bucharest established.
  - Saint Joseph Cathedral completed.
  - Orient Express (Paris-Bucharest) begins operating.
- 1884 – Doamna Balasa church built.
- 1886
  - Romanian Philharmonic Society founded.
  - Capșa Hotel in business.
  - City hosts signing of the Treaty of Bucharest (1886).

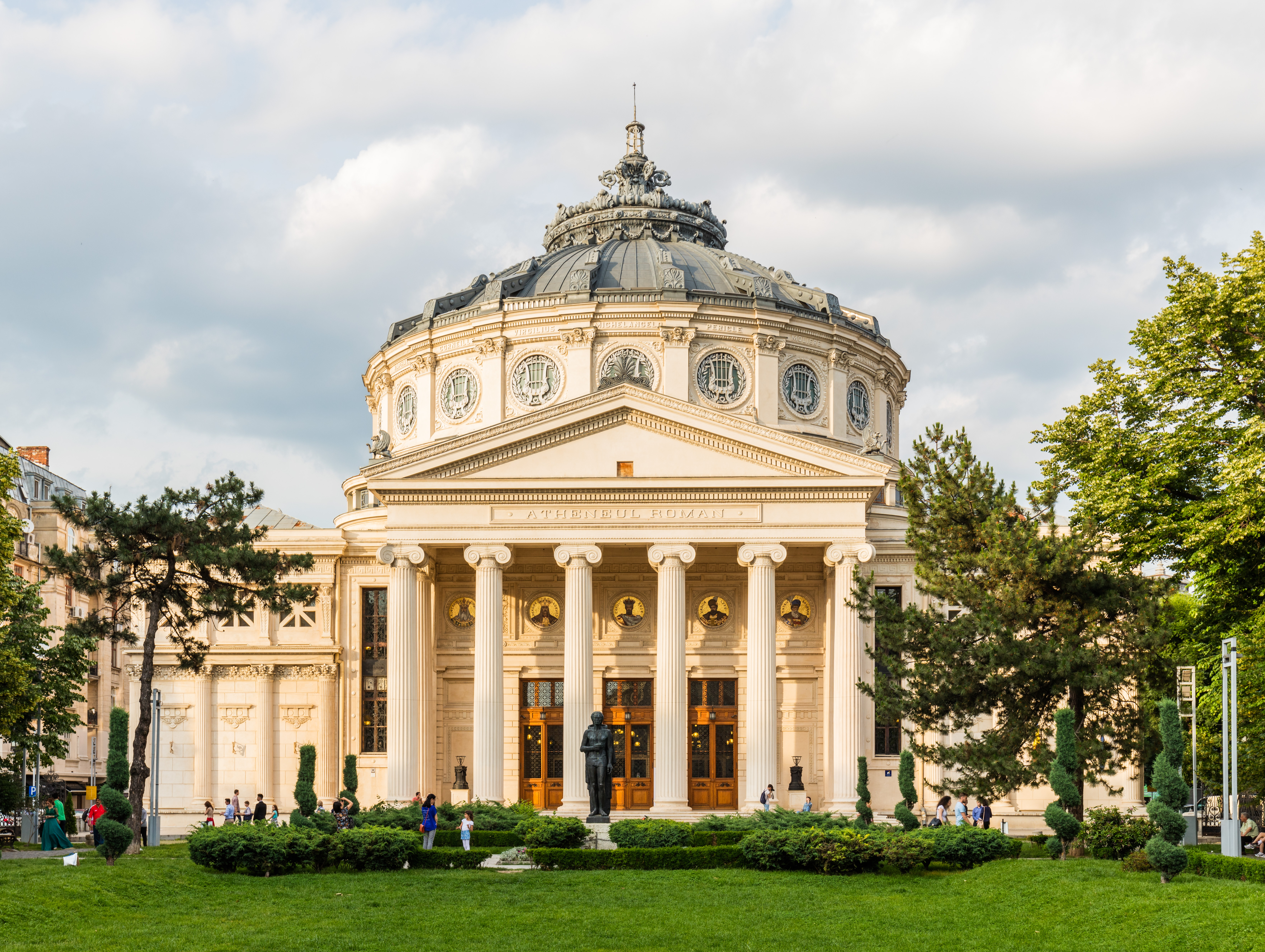
Romanian Athenaeum

- 1888
  - Romanian Athenaeum built.
  - Pache Protopopescu becomes mayor.
  - Piața Rosetti laid out.
- 1890 – League for the Cultural Unity of All Romanians founded.
- 1891 – Bucharest Botanical Garden opens.
- 1894
  - Electric tram begins operating.
  - Central School for Girls built.
- 1895 – Central University Library of Bucharest established.
- 1900
  - House of Savings built.
  - Population: 282,071.

== 20th century ==
- 1906 – Bucharest Jubilee Exhibition held.
- 1909
  - Bucharest Russian Church built.
  - Saint Basil the Great Cathedral opened.
- 1912 – Military Circle built.
- 1913 – City hosts signing of the Treaty of Bucharest (1913).
- 1914 – Anglican Church (Bucharest) built.
- 1916
  - 6 December: German occupation of city begins.
  - August: City hosts signing of the Treaty of Bucharest (1916).
- 1918
  - German occupation of city ends.
  - May: City hosts signing of the Treaty of Bucharest (1918).
  - December: Typographers' strike is violently suppressed
- 1925 – Dramă şi Comedie (theatre troupe) active.
- 1929 – Dem I. Dobrescu becomes mayor.
- 1930 – Italian Church built.
- 1931 – Scînteia newspaper begins publication.
- 1933
  - Grivița Strike of 1933.
  - Bucharest Telephone Palace built.
- 1936
  - Herăstrău Park opens.
  - Arcul de Triumf erected on Kiseleff Road.
  - Dimitrie Gusti National Village Museum in Bucharest established.
- 1937
  - Scala Cinema opens.
  - Royal Palace built.
- 1938 – Cașin Church built.
- 1940
  - Political unrest.
  - Germans in power.
  - November: 1940 Vrancea earthquake.
- 1941 – January: Legionnaires' rebellion and Bucharest pogrom.
- 1944
  - Bombing of Bucharest in World War II begins.
  - 31 August: City occupied by Russian forces.
  - Geography Institute founded.
- 1945 – Bombing of Bucharest in World War II ends.
- 1946 – Textile school founded.
- 1947 – City becomes capital of the newly formed Romanian People's Republic.
- 1948
  - Information Bureau of the Communist and Workers' Parties headquarters relocated to Bucharest from Belgrade, Yugoslavia.
  - City streets renamed.
  - FC Dinamo București founded.
  - Population: 886,110; metro 1,041,807.
- 1952 – Băneasa Airport terminal opens.
- 1953
  - August: City hosts 4th World Festival of Youth and Students.
  - National Stadium opens.
- 1956
  - Bucharest student movement.
  - Casa Scînteii built.
- 1958
  - World Festival of Puppet Theatres held.
  - George Enescu Festival of music begins.
- 1959
  - Basarab railway station built.
  - 500th anniversary of city founding.
- 1964 – Population: 1,239,458 city; 1,372,130 urban agglomeration.
- 1970 – Otopeni Airport terminal built.
- 1971 – New St. Eleftherios Church consecrated.
- 1974 – Systematization, a program of urban planning, begins.
- 1976
  - Unirea Shopping Center opens.
  - Ion Dincă becomes mayor.
- 1977
  - March: 1977 Vrancea earthquake.
  - Population: 1,807,044 city; 1,934,025 urban agglomeration.
- 1979
  - Bucharest Metro begins operating.
  - Piața Unirii metro station opens.
- 1981 – Republica metro station opens.
- 1985
  - Victory of Socialism Boulevard laid out.
  - Palace of the People construction begins.
- 1989
  - December: Romanian Revolution.
  - 21 December: Ceaușescu's final speech takes place at Palace Square.
  - 22 December: Ceaușescu flees city.
  - Adevărul newspaper in publication.
- 1990
  - April: Golaniad protest begins.
  - June 1990 Mineriad protest.
- 1993 – Basarab metro station opens.
- 1994 – Coat of arms of Bucharest re-adopted.
- 1996 – Victor Ciorbea becomes mayor.
- 1997 – Palace of the Parliament built.
- 2000
  - Pavilion Unicredit (art centre) established.
  - Traian Băsescu becomes mayor.
  - Centre for Defence and Security Strategic Studies headquartered in city.

== 21st century ==
- 2002
  - Bamboo Club (nightclub) opens.
  - Chamber of Commerce and Industry of Romania building constructed.
- 2005
  - Bucharest Biennale begins.
  - Adriean Videanu becomes mayor.
- 2006 – Junior Eurovision Song Contest 2006 held.
- 2007 – January: Romania becomes part of the European Union.
- 2008
  - Sorin Oprescu becomes mayor.
  - April: City hosts NATO summit.
  - 1st Infantry Division (Romania) headquartered in Bucharest.
- 2009 – City Gate Towers built.
- 2010
  - May: Economic protest.
  - Nusco Tower built.
- 2011
  - Basarab Overpass opens.
  - National Stadium rebuilt.
  - Population: 1,883,425; metro 2,272,163.
- 2012
  - 5 March: 2012 Bucharest hair salon shooting.
  - 2012 Romanian protests.
  - National Library of Romania new building opens.
- 2013
  - Dinamo Polyvalent Hall (arena) opens.
  - Floreasca City Center built.
- 2015
  - Colectiv nightclub fire kills at least 26 people; deadliest-ever nightclub fire in Romania and one of the deadliest incidents in the city and the country since the end of the anti-communist revolution in 1989.
  - Bucharest Nine (B9) organization is established by the President of Romania Klaus Iohannis and the President of Poland Andrzej Duda on 4 November.

== See also ==
- History of Bucharest
- List of mayors of Bucharest

== Bibliography ==
=== Published in 19th century ===
- David Brewster, ed. (1830). "Bucharest". Edinburgh Encyclopaedia. Edinburgh: William Blackwood.
- John Thomson (1845), "Bucharest", New Universal Gazetteer and Geographical Dictionary, London: H.G. Bohn
- "Bucharest", A Handbook for Travellers in Turkey (3rd ed.), London: J. Murray, 1854, OCLC 2145740
- "From Pera to Bucharest". Blackwood's Edinburgh Magazine. 81 (496). 1857. hdl:2027/njp.32101076890183.
- Charles Knight, ed. (1866). "Buchorest". Geography. English Cyclopaedia. Vol. 2. London: Bradbury, Evans, & Co. hdl:2027/nyp.33433000064794.
- George Henry Townsend (1867), "Bucharest", Manual of Dates (2nd ed.), London: Frederick Warne & Co.
- Florence K. Berger (1877), "Bucharest", A Winter in the City of Pleasure, London: R. Bentley & Son, OCLC 4538535
- George Ripley; Charles A. Dana, eds. (1879). "Bucharest". American Cyclopedia (2nd ed.). New York: D. Appleton and Company.
- Archibald Wilberforce (1893). "Bucharest". Capitals of the Globe. NY: Peter Fenelon Collier. hdl:2027/mdp.39015061863513.
- I.S. Floru (1896). "Bucuresci". In Corneliu Diaconovich [in Romanian] (ed.). Enciclopedia Română [Romanian Encyclopedia] (in Romanian). Vol. 1. Sibiiu: W. Krafft. pp. 606–619.

=== Published in 20th century ===
- "Bucharest", Chambers's Encyclopaedia, London: W. & R. Chambers, 1901
- "Bukarest", Türkei, Rumänien, Serbien, Bulgarien [Turkey, Romania, Serbia, Bulgaria], Meyers Reisebücher (in German) (6th ed.), Leipzig: Bibliographisches Institut, 1902, hdl:2027/njp.32101064637836
- "Bucharest" . Encyclopædia Britannica. Vol. 4 (11th ed.). 1910. pp. 717–718.
- Benjamin Vincent (1910), "Bucharest", Haydn's Dictionary of Dates (25th ed.), London: Ward, Lock & Co.
- "Bucharest", Austria-Hungary, with Excursions to Cetinje, Belgrade, and Bucharest (11th ed.), Leipzig: Karl Baedeker, 1911
- "Bucharest". Encyclopaedia of Islam. E.J. Brill. 1913. ISBN 9004082654.
- Winifred Gordon (1918), "Latin Oasis", Roumania, London: John Lane
- Paul Morand (1935), Bucarest (in French), Paris: Plon, OCLC 3510578
- Darrick Danta (1993). "Ceausescu's Bucharest". Geographical Review. 83 (2): 170–182. doi:10.2307/215255. JSTOR 215255.
- Michael Vachon (1993). "Bucharest: The House of the People". World Policy Journal. 10 (4): 59–63. JSTOR 40209336.
- "Romania: Bucharest", Eastern and Central Europe (17th ed.), Fodor's, 1996, OL 7697674M
- Luminita Machedon; Ernie Scoffham (1999). Romanian Modernism: The Architecture of Bucharest 1920–1940. MIT Press. ISBN 978-0-262-13348-7.

=== Published in 21st century ===
- Duncan Light; et al. (2002). "Toponymy and the Communist city: Street names in Bucharest, 1948-1965". GeoJournal. 56 (2): 135–144. doi:10.1023/A:1022469601470. JSTOR 41147676. S2CID 140915309.
- Roxana Verona (2007). "Bucharest at the Crossroads". PMLA. 122 (1): 275–280. doi:10.1632/pmla.2007.122.1.275. JSTOR 25501688. S2CID 161566696.
- Laurențiu Rădvan [in Romanian] (2010), "Towns in Wallachia: Bucharest", At Europe's Borders: Medieval Towns in the Romanian Principalities, Translated by Valentin Cîrdei, Leiden: Brill, p. 255+, ISBN 9789004180109
