= 2019 in Romanian kickboxing =

The 2019 season was the 17th season of competitive kickboxing in Romania.

== List of events ==
#	Event Title	Date	Arena	Location
1	OSS Fighters 03	February 28, 2019	Sala Polivalentă	Bucharest, Romania
2	Colosseum Tournament 11	March 29, 2019	Sala Polivalentă	Bucharest, Romania
3	SNF 3	March 31, 2019	Sala Sporturilor	Dej, Romania
4	Colosseum Tournament 12	May 9, 2019	Sala Polivalentă	Arad, Romania
5	Urban Legend 7: Romania vs. Netherlands	May 25, 2019	Sala Sporturilor	Constanța, Romania
6	KO Masters 3	June 3, 2019	Berăria H	Bucharest, Romania
7	Dynamite Fighting Show 4	June 6, 2019	Sala Sporturilor Horia Demian	Cluj-Napoca, Romania
8	SAS Gym 02	June 13, 2019	Bamboo Club	Bucharest, Romania
9	Fight Zone 5	June 16, 2019	Sala Sporturilor	Deva, Romania
10	Colosseum Tournament 13	June 28, 2019	Sala Polivalentă	Călărași, Romania
11	Colosseum Tournament 14	July 20, 2019	Sala Gabriel Udișteanu	Fălticeni, Romania
12	OSS Fighters 04	August 22, 2019	Piațeta Cazino	Mamaia, Romania
13	KO Masters 4	September 16, 2019	Berăria H	Bucharest, Romania
14	Colosseum Tournament 15	September 22, 2019	Arena Antonio Alexe	Oradea, Romania
15	Dynamite Fighting Show 5: Team Moroșanu vs. Team Bonjasky	September 27, 2019	Sala Polivalentă	Piatra Neamț, Romania
16	Colosseum Tournament 16	October 28, 2019	Sala Transilvania	Sibiu, Romania
17	KO Masters 5	November 14, 2019	Berăria H	Bucharest, Romania
18	Dynamite Fighting Show 6	November 21, 2019	Sala Polivalentă	Iași, Romania
19	KO Masters 6	November 25, 2019	Berăria H	Bucharest, Romania
20	GFC 6: Romania vs. Netherlands	November 29, 2019	Sala Constantin Jude	Timișoara, Romania
21	Colosseum Tournament 17	December 1, 2019	Sala Polivalentă	Bucharest, Romania
22	Mix Kombat 5	December 7, 2019	Sala Polivalentă	Bistrița, Romania
23	Fight Zone 6	December 20, 2019	Sala Sporturilor	Deva, Romania

== OSS Fighters 03 ==
OSS Fighters 03
- Promotion: OSS Fighters
- Date: February 28, 2019
- Venue: Sala Polivalentă
- City: Bucharest, Romania

Event chronology
Colosseum Tournament 10	OSS Fighters 03	Dynamite Fighting Show 6

OSS Fighters 03 was a kickboxing event produced by the OSS Fighters that took place on February 28, 2019, at the Sala Polivalentă in Bucharest, Romania.

=== Results ===
OSS Fighters 03 (Sport Extra)
Weight Class				Method	Round	Time	Notes
71 kg	(Romania) Amansio Paraschiv	def.	(Romania) Cristian Milea	Decision (unanimous)	3	3:00	
83 kg	(Romania) Alex Filip	def.	(Poland) Janilson da Cruz	TKO (referee stoppage)	1	1:55	
63 kg	(Romania) Cristian Spetcu	def.	(Greece) Filippos Petaroudis	Decision	3	3:00	
Heavyweight 120 kg	(Romania) Cristian Ristea	def.	(Ukraine) Yurii Chornoivanenko	Decision	3	3:00	
86 kg	(Romania) Ciprian Șchiopu	def.	(Greece) Petros Vardakas	Decision	3	3:00	
Heavyweight 120 kg	(Romania) Ion Grigore	def.	(Romania) Costin Mincu	KO (left hook)	1	1:27	
Heavyweight 120 kg	(Romania) Valentin Bordianu	def.	(Romania) Remus Marin	KO (right high kick)	1	2:25	
70 kg	(Romania) Ștefan Orza	def.	(Romania) Florin Pîrtea	Decision (unanimous)	3	3:00	

== Colosseum Tournament 11 ==
Colosseum Tournament 11
- Promotion: Colosseum Tournament
- Date: March 29, 2019
- Venue: Sala Polivalentă
- City: Bucharest, Romania

Event chronology
OSS Fighters 03	Colosseum Tournament 11	SNF 3

Colosseum Tournament 11 was a kickboxing event produced by the Colosseum Tournament that took place on March 29, 2019, at the Sala Polivalentă in Bucharest, Romania.

=== Results ===
Colosseum Tournament 11 (FightBox)
Weight Class				Method	Round	Time	Notes
Heavyweight 120 kg	(Romania) Daniel Ghiță	def.	(Czech Republic) Petr Vondráček	KO (left hook)	1	2:22	
71 kg	(Romania) Cristian Milea	def.	(Czech Republic) Radek Rousal	Decision (unanimous)	3	3:00	
81 kg	(Romania) Eduard Gafencu	def.	(Netherlands) Thomas Doeve	KO (tornado kick)	1	2:19	
75 kg	(Romania) Mirel Drăgan	def.	(Serbia) Danijel Aranđelovic	Decision (unanimous)	3	3:00	
71 kg	(Romania) Andrei Ostrovanu	def.	(Bulgaria) Bogdan Shumarov	Decision (split)	3	3:00	
81 kg	(Bulgaria) Aleksandar Petrov	def.	(Romania) Radu Medeleanu	Decision (unanimous)	3	3:00	
81 kg	(Romania) Călin Petrișor	def.	(Romania) Alexandru Cuciureanu	TKO (towel thrown)	2	1:10	
Heavyweight 120 kg	(Romania) Marius Munteanu	def.	(Romania) Mihai Cîrstea	Decision (split)	3	3:00	
65 kg	(Romania) Florin Soare	def.	(Romania) Petre Jarcu	Decision (split)	3	3:00	
91 kg	(Romania) Cosmin Ionescu	def.	(Romania) Marius Hetea	KO (knee to the head)	1	0:40	
71 kg	(Romania) Florin Niculae	vs.	(Romania) Gabriel Manea	No contest (low blow)	1	2:31	

== SNF 3 ==
SNF 3
- Promotion: Supreme Night Fight
- Date: March 31, 2019
- Venue: Sala Sporturilor
- City: Dej, Romania

Event chronology
Colosseum Tournament 11	SNF 3	Colosseum Tournament 12

SNF 3 was a kickboxing event produced by the Supreme Night Fight that took place on March 31, 2019, at the Sala Sporturilor in Dej, Romania.

=== Results ===
Main Card
Weight Class				Method	Round	Time	Notes
Super Bantamweight	(Moldova) Serghei Zanosiev	def.	(Italy) Marian Bellettini	Decision	5	3:00	For the WMMAFC Super Bantamweight Championship
Featherweight	(Romania) Adrian Maxim	def.	(Italy) Sergio Vinto	Decision (unanimous)	3	3:00	
Welterweight	(Romania) Anghel Cardoş	def.	(Moldova) Valentin Pascali	Decision (split)	3	3:00	
Featherweight	(Romania) Marian Lăpușneanu	def.	(Romania) Dario Drotar	TKO (three knockdown rule)	3	1:57	
Welterweight	(Romania) Lucian Casoni	def.	(Romania) Bogdan Costan	KO (head kick)	2	1:33	
Featherweight	(Romania) Vlad Trif	vs.	(Romania) Alexandru Marton	Draw	4	3:00	
Welterweight	(Romania) Mădălin Crăciunică	def.	(Romania) Valentin Sachelaru	Decision	3	3:00	For the SNF Welterweight Championship
Welterweight	(Romania) Dragoș Fluerașu	def.	(Romania) Cristian Stoica	Decision	3	3:00	
Lightweight	(Italy) Filippo Martini	def.	(Romania) Marian Timofte	Decision (split)	3	3:00	
Lightweight	(Romania) Marian Dinu	vs.	(Romania) Andrei Verde	Draw	4	3:00	
Middleweight	(Romania) Cătălin Breban	def.	(Moldova) Vasile Borșevschi	TKO (3 knockdown rule)	1	2:40	
Featherweight	(Romania) Iosif Cosmin	def.	(Romania) David Constantin	TKO (retirement)	3	1:42	

== Colosseum Tournament 12 ==
Colosseum Tournament 12
- Promotion: Colosseum Tournament
- Date: May 9, 2019
- Venue: Sala Polivalentă
- City: Arad, Romania

Event chronology
SNF 3	Colosseum Tournament 12	Urban Legend 7

Colosseum Tournament 12 was a kickboxing event produced by the Colosseum Tournament that took place on May 9, 2019, at the Sala Polivalentă in Arad, Romania.

=== Results ===
Colosseum Tournament 12 (FightBox)
Weight Class				Method	Round	Time	Notes
77 kg	(Romania) Eduard Gafencu	def.	(Netherlands) Ekrem Doruk	KO (jumping knee and punches)	2	2:13	For the Colosseum Tournament World -77 kg Championship
Super Heavyweight 120 kg	(Romania) Alexandru Lungu	def.	(Hungary) Zoltán Enyedi	KO (left hook)	2	0:20	
Heavyweight 120 kg	(Romania) Costin Mincu	def.	(Romania) Marius Munteanu	Decision (split)	3	3:00	Tournament Final. For the Colosseum Tournament World Heavyweight Championship
95 kg	(Romania) Sebastian Cozmâncă	def.	(Morocco) Badr Ferdous	TKO (retirement)	2	3:00	
81 kg	(Romania) Adrian Mitu	def.	(Netherlands) Michael Boapeah	Decision (unanimous)	3	3:00	
71 kg	(Romania) Haris Ferizović	def.	(Romania) Teodar Mardar	Decision	4	3:00	
75 kg	(Romania) Florentin Niculae	def.	(Romania) Sorin Horváth	TKO	3	2:36	
72,5 kg	(Romania) Anghel Cardoș	def.	(Romania) Marian Dinu	Decision (unanimous)	3	3:00	
Heavyweight 120 kg	(Romania) Marius Munteanu	def.	(Moldova) Alexandru Velenciuc	KO (left hook)	2	0:54	Tournament Semi-Finals
Heavyweight 120 kg	(Romania) Costin Mincu	def.	(Romania) György Szabó	TKO (referee stoppage/three knockdown rule)	1	1:24	Tournament Semi-Finals

== Urban Legend 7 ==
Urban Legend 7
- Promotion: Urban Legend
- Date: May 25, 2019
- Venue: Sala Sporturilor
- City: Constanța, Romania

Event chronology
Colosseum Tournament 12	Urban Legend 7	KO Masters 3

Urban Legend 7 (also known as Romania vs. Netherlands) was a kickboxing, mixed martial arts and boxing event produced by the Urban Legend in association with Superpro Sportcenter that took place on May 25, 2019, at the Sala Sporturilor in Constanța, Romania.

=== Results ===
Main Card
Weight Class				Method	Round	Time	Notes
Heavyweight	(Netherlands) Max van Gelder	def.	(Romania) Ionuţ Spătărelu	KO	1	2:21	
Lightweight	(Romania) Mădălin Crăciunică	def.	(Netherlands) Thommy Schonis	Decision	3	3:00	
Welterweight	(Netherlands) Nasr Essalhi	def.	(Romania) Eduard Chelariu	Decision	3	3:00	
Featherweight	(Netherlands) Darryl Verdonk	def.	(Romania) David Constantin	TKO	2	0:49	
Featherweight	(Netherlands) Richie van Dijk	def.	(Romania) Marius Breazu	TKO	2	2:44	
Welterweight	(Romania) Cristian Stoica	def.	(Romania) Mădălin Chirovan	KO	2	0:21	
Light Heavyweight	(Romania) Vlăduţ Ungureanu	def.	(Moldova) Nicolai Garbuz	Decision	3	3:00	
Lightweight	(Romania) Ștefan Orza	def.	(Romania) Ionuţ Laszlo	KO	2	1:55	
Middleweight	(Romania) Vasile Amariţei	def.	(Romania) Robert Dorin	Decision	3	3:00	
Featherweight	(Romania) Marius Cimpoeru	def.	(Romania) Marius Datcu	TKO	2	1:40	
Welterweight	(Romania) Denis Derviş	def.	(Romania) Robert Craiu	KO	2	0:07	
Welterweight	(Romania) Octavian Cocoş	def.	(Romania) Marian Preşa	KO	3	2:06	

== KO Masters 3 ==
KO Masters 3
- Promotion: KO Masters
- Date: June 3, 2019
- Venue: Berăria H
- City: Bucharest, Romania

Event chronology
Urban Legend 7	KO Masters 3	Dynamite Fighting Show 4

KO Masters 3 was a kickboxing and bare-knuckle boxing event produced by the KO Masters that took place on June 3, 2019, at the Berăria H in Bucharest, Romania.

=== Results ===
KO Masters 3
Weight Class				Method	Round	Time	Notes
65 kg	(Romania) Florin Lupu	def.	(Romania) Ioan Vrânceanu	Decision (split)	3	3:00	Bare-knuckle boxing
65 kg	(Romania) Adrian Maxim	def.	(Iran) Mohammad Firouzabadi	KO (left hook)	2	2:05	
75 kg	(Romania) Mirel Drăgan	def.	(Serbia) Stefan Đumić	KO (liver kick)	3	2:15	
Heavyweight 120 kg	(Romania) Ion Grigore	def.	(Romania) Mihai Ştefan	TKO (referee stoppage/punches)	1	1:25	
81 kg	(Romania) Costin Dinu	def.	(Romania) Nicu Buceac	KO (knees & punches)	3	2:52	

== Dynamite Fighting Show 4 ==
Dynamite Fighting Show 4
- Promotion: Dynamite Fighting Show
- Date: June 6, 2019
- Venue: Sala Sporturilor Horia Demian
- City: Cluj-Napoca, Romania
- Attendance: 3,000

Event chronology
KO Masters 3	Dynamite Fighting Show 4	SAS Gym 02

Dynamite Fighting Show 4 (also known as Moroșanu vs. Sam) was a kickboxing and professional boxing event produced by the Dynamite Fighting Show that took place on June 6, 2019, at the Sala Sporturilor Horia Demian in Cluj-Napoca, Romania. The event was sold out.

=== Results ===
Dynamite Fighting Show 4
Weight Class				Method	Round	Time	Notes
Heavyweight 120 kg	(Romania) Cătălin Moroșanu	def.	(United Kingdom) Daniel Sam	Decision (unanimous)	3	3:00	
Heavyweight (Boxing)	(Romania) Benjamin Adegbuyi	def.	(Croatia) Igor Mihaljević	Decision (unanimous)	4	3:00	
Light Heavyweight 81 kg	(Romania) Florin Lambagiu	def.	(Romania) Flavius Boiciuc	KO (left hook)	1	2:57	Light Heavyweight Tournament Final
Light Heavyweight 82 kg	(Romania) Bogdan Năstase	def.	(Switzerland) Manuel Rifa	Decision (unanimous)	3	3:00	
Heavyweight 120 kg	(Romania) Cristian Ristea	def.	(Netherlands) Eldar Oliveira	Decision (unanimous)	3	3:00	
Heavyweight 120 kg	(Italy) Claudio Istrate	def.	(Romania) Ionuț Iancu	Decision	3	3:00	
Lightweight 67 kg	(Moldova) Andrei Pisari	def.	(Romania) Daniel Corbeanu	KO (left hook)	3	2:41	
Light Heavyweight 81 kg	(Romania) Florin Lambagiu	def.	(Romania) Claudiu Bădoi	Decision (unanimous)	3	3:00	Light Heavyweight Tournament Semi-Finals
Light Heavyweight 81 kg	(Romania) Flavius Boiciuc	def.	(Romania) Mădălin Mogoş	Decision	3	3:00	Light Heavyweight Tournament Semi-Finals

=== Awards ===
- Fight of the Night: Cătălin Moroșanu vs. Daniel Sam

== SAS Gym 02 ==
SAS Gym 02
- Promotion: SAS Gym
- Date: June 13, 2019
- Venue: Bamboo Club
- City: Bucharest, Romania

Event chronology
Dynamite Fighting Show 4	SAS Gym 02	Fight Zone 5

SAS Gym 02 was a kickboxing event produced by the SAS Gym that took place on June 13, 2019, at the Bamboo Club in Bucharest, Romania.

=== Results ===
Main Card
Weight Class				Method	Round	Time	Notes
Lightweight 71 kg	(Romania) Sorin Căliniuc	def.	(Russia) Khayal Dzhaniev	Decision (unanimous)	3	3:00	Lightweight Tournament Final
Middleweight 81 kg	(Iran) Mohammad Ghaedibardeh	def.	(Romania) Alexandru Irimia	TKO (referee stoppage/three knockdown rule)	1	2:36	
Lightweight 71 kg	(Spain) Edye Ruiz	def.	(Romania) Amansio Paraschiv	Decision (split)	3	3:00	
Lightweight 71 kg	(Romania) Sorin Căliniuc	def.	(France) Dylan Salvador	Decision (split)	3	3:00	Lightweight Tournament Semi-Finals
Lightweight 71 kg	(Russia) Khayal Dzhaniev	def.	(Netherlands) Christian Baya	Decision (split)	3	3:00	Lightweight Tournament Semi-Finals
Welterweight 77 kg	(Romania) Daniel Pattvean	def.	(Serbia) Nikola Todorović	Decision (unanimous)	3	3:00	

== Fight Zone 5 ==
Fight Zone 5
- Promotion: Fight Zone
- Date: June 16, 2019
- Venue: Sala Sporturilor
- City: Deva, Romania

Event chronology
SAS Gym 02	Fight Zone 5	Colosseum Tournament 13

Fight Zone 5 was a kickboxing, boxing and mixed martial arts event produced by the Fight Zone that took place on June 16, 2019, at the Sala Sporturilor in Deva, Romania.

=== Results ===
Main Card
Weight Class				Method	Round	Time	Notes
Heavyweight	(France) Freddy Kemayo	def.	(Romania) Gheorghe Ioniță	KO (punch)	1	0:31	For the Fight Zone Heavyweight Championship
Bantamweight	(Romania) Daniel Ionescu	def.	(Romania) Vlăduț Oprică	Decision (unanimous)	3	3:00	Bantamweight Tournament Final
Featherweight	(Azerbaijan) İska İsmayilov	def.	(Romania) Ciprian Mureşan	TKO (leg injury)	2	0:12	
Heavyweight	(Romania) Caius Gazibara	def.	(Romania) Victor Varga	TKO (referee stoppage)	1	2:19	

== Colosseum Tournament 13 ==
Colosseum Tournament 13
- Promotion: Colosseum Tournament
- Date: June 28, 2019
- Venue: Sala Polivalentă
- City: Călărași, Romania

Event chronology
Fight Zone 5	Colosseum Tournament 13	Colosseum Tournament 14

Colosseum Tournament 13 was a kickboxing event produced by the Colosseum Tournament that took place on June 28, 2019, at the Sala Polivalentă in Călărași, Romania.

=== Results ===
Colosseum Tournament 13 (FightBox)
Weight Class				Method	Round	Time	Notes
86 kg	(Romania) Cosmin Ionescu (c)	def.	(Serbia) Miloš Cvjetićanin	Decision (split)	5	3:00	For the Colosseum Tournament World -86 kg Championship
65 kg	(Romania) Ionuț Atodiresei	def.	(Georgia (country)) Aleksandre Gamqrelidze	KO (middle kick)	3	1:20	
71 kg	(Romania) Cristian Milea	def.	(Ukraine) Serhii Poliuha	Decision (unanimous)	3	3:00	
Heavyweight 120 kg	(Romania) Marius Munteanu	def.	(Romania) Costin Mincu (c)	Decision (unanimous)	5	3:00	For the Colosseum Tournament World Heavyweight Championship
81 kg	(Romania) Adelin Mihăilă	vs.	(Romania) Radu Medeleanu	Draw	3	3:00	
86 kg	(Romania) Vasile Amariței	def.	(Romania) Claudiu Alexe	Decision (unanimous)	3	3:00	
71 kg	(Romania) Teodar Mardar	def.	(Romania) Denis Derviș	Decision (split)	3	3:00	
72,5 kg	(Romania) Marian Dinu	def.	(Romania) Anghel Cardoș	Decision (unanimous)	3	3:00	
55 kg	(Romania) Nicolae Costin	vs.	(Romania) Robert Hu Hua Long	Draw	3	3:00	

== Colosseum Tournament 14 ==
Colosseum Tournament 14
- Promotion: Colosseum Tournament
- Date: July 20, 2019
- Venue: Sala Gabriel Udișteanu
- City: Fălticeni, Romania
- Attendance: 1,800

Event chronology
Colosseum Tournament 13	Colosseum Tournament 14	OSS Fighters 04

Colosseum Tournament 14 was a kickboxing event produced by the Colosseum Tournament that took place on July 20, 2019, at the Sala Gabriel Udișteanu in Fălticeni, Romania.

=== Results ===
Colosseum Tournament 14
Weight Class				Method	Round	Time	Notes
65 kg	(Romania) Ionuț Atodiresei	def.	(Italy) Fabrizio Conti	Decision (unanimous)	3	3:00	
95 kg	(Romania) Sebastian Cozmâncă	def.	(Netherlands) Tarik Cherkaoui	KO (right hook)	1	2:05	
81 kg	(Romania) Adrian Mitu	def.	(Netherlands) Thomas Doeve	Decision (unanimous)	3	3:00	
71 kg	(Romania) Andrei Ostrovanu	def.	(Romania) Andrei Şerban	KO (liver punch)	2	0:45	
86 kg	(Netherlands) Jimi Van Oeveren	def.	(Romania) Vasile Amariţei	KO (knee)	2	2:34	
81 kg	(Romania) Adelin Mihăilă	def.	(Moldova) Vasile Borşevschi	KO (left punch)	2	0:44	
75 kg	(Romania) Rayko Levițchi	def.	(Romania) Alin Răducu	TKO (towel thrown)	2	1:37	
65 kg	(Moldova) Ghenadie Gîtlan	def.	(Romania) Ionuț Popa	KO (left high kick)	2	0:10	
75 kg	(Romania) Marian Dinu	def.	(Romania) Teodor Mardar	Decision (unanimous)	3	3:00	
65 kg	(Romania) Adrian Baciu	def.	(Romania) Silviu Ionescu	Decision (split)	3	3:00	

== OSS Fighters 04 ==
OSS Fighters 04
- Promotion: OSS Fighters
- Date: August 22, 2019
- Venue: Piațeta Cazino
- City: Mamaia, Romania

Event chronology
Colosseum Tournament 14	OSS Fighters 04	KO Masters 4

OSS Fighters 04 was a kickboxing event produced by the OSS Fighters that took place on August 22, 2019, at the Piațeta Cazino in Mamaia, Romania.

=== Results ===
OSS Fighters 04 (FightBox)
Weight Class				Method	Round	Time	Notes
72,5 kg	(Romania) Amansio Paraschiv (c)	def.	(Italy) Rosario Presti	Decision (unanimous)	3	3:00	For the SUPERKOMBAT Lightweight Championship
95 kg	(Romania) Cristian Ristea	def.	(Germany) Vladimir Toktasynov	Decision (unanimous)	3	3:00	
81 kg	(Romania) Alex Filip	def.	(Romania) Mădălin Mogoş	Decision (unanimous)	3	3:00	
95 kg	(Netherlands) Fabio Kwasi	def.	(Romania) Claudiu Istrate	TKO (arm injury)	2	0:43	
77 kg	(Romania) Daniel Pattvean	def.	(Brazil) Rodrigo Guilherme	KO (knee)	2	2:10	
90 kg	(Romania) Robert Dorin	def.	(Romania) Remus Petrică	TKO (retirement)	2	2:37	
Heavyweight 120 kg	(Romania) Alexandru Radnev	def.	(Romania) Marian Radu	KO (right punch)	1	2:59	
Heavyweight 120 kg	(Romania) Ștefan Mihai	def.	(Romania) Vlăduț Ungureanu	Decision (split)	3	3:00	
86 kg	(Romania) Claudiu Alexe	def.	(Romania) Dragoș Imbrea	TKO (referee stoppage/punches)	1	2:58	
75 kg	(Romania) Eduard Chelariu	def.	(Moldova) Valentin Pascali	Decision (unanimous)	3	3:00	
72 kg	(Moldova) Victor Apostol	def.	(Romania) Mădălin Crăciunică	KO (knee to the head)	2	0:30	
Undercard
Heavyweight 120 kg	(Romania) Cristian Constantinov	def.	(Romania) Raul Manoilă	Decision	3	3:00	
68 kg	(Romania) Ștefan Orza	def.	(Romania) Călin Petrișor	Decision	3	3:00	
65 kg	(Romania) Ștefan Ilaşcu	def.	(Romania) Victor Ispas	Decision	3	3:00	

== KO Masters 4 ==
KO Masters 4
- Promotion: KO Masters
- Date: September 16, 2019
- Venue: Berăria H
- City: Bucharest, Romania

Event chronology
OSS Fighters 04	KO Masters 4	Colosseum Tournament 15

KO Masters 4 was a kickboxing event produced by the KO Masters that took place on September 16, 2019, at the Berăria H in Bucharest, Romania.

=== Results ===
KO Masters 4 (Fight Network/Sport Extra)
Weight Class				Method	Round	Time	Notes
Heavyweight 120 kg	(Romania) Ion Grigore	def.	(Romania) Eugen Mailat	KO (punches)	1	0:14	
81 kg	(Romania) Cezar Buzdugan	def.	(Romania) Alexandru Popescu	Decision (unanimous)	3	3:00	

== Colosseum Tournament 15 ==
Colosseum Tournament 15
- Promotion: Colosseum Tournament
- Date: September 22, 2019
- Venue: Arena Antonio Alexe
- City: Oradea, Romania

Event chronology
KO Masters 4	Colosseum Tournament 15	Dynamite Fighting Show 5

Colosseum Tournament 15 was a kickboxing event produced by the Colosseum Tournament that took place on September 22, 2019, at the Arena Antonio Alexe in Oradea, Romania.

=== Results ===
Colosseum Tournament 15 (FightBox/Sport Extra)
Weight Class				Method	Round	Time	Notes
Super Heavyweight 120 kg	(Romania) Alexandru Lungu	def.	(Netherlands) Satisch Jhamai	KO (punches flurry)	2	2:25	
Lightweight 71 kg	(Romania) Andrei Ostrovanu	def.	(Romania) Marian Dinu	TKO (corner stoppage)	1	1:55	For the Colosseum Tournament World -71 kg Championship
65 kg	(Romania) Adrian Maxim	def.	(Armenia) Artyom Grigoryan	Decision (unanimous)	3	3:00	
81 kg	(Romania) Adrian Mitu	def.	(Ukraine) Oleksandr Gayduchok	Decision (unanimous)	5	3:00	For the inaugural Colosseum Tournament World -81 kg Championship
Heavyweight 120 kg	(Romania) Marius Munteanu	def.	(Morocco) Tarik Cherkaoui	KO (left hook)	1	2:54	
72,5 kg	(Romania) Anghel Cardoş	def.	(Romania) Alexandru Voicu	Decision (split)	4	3:00	
90 kg	(Romania) Sebastian Lutaniuc	def.	(Romania) Alexandru Stan	Decision (unanimous)	3	3:00	
77 kg	(Romania) Alexandru Ianțoc	def.	(Romania) Sorin Horváth	TKO (corner stoppage)	3	1:10	

== Dynamite Fighting Show 5 ==
Dynamite Fighting Show 5
- Promotion: Dynamite Fighting Show
- Date: September 27, 2019
- Venue: Sala Polivalentă
- City: Piatra Neamț, Romania
- Attendance: 4,000

Event chronology
Colosseum Tournament 15	Dynamite Fighting Show 5	UFT 8

Dynamite Fighting Show 5 (also known as Team Moroșanu vs. Team Bonjasky) was a kickboxing and mixed martial arts event produced by the Dynamite Fighting Show that took place on September 27, 2019, at the Sala Polivalentă in Piatra Neamț, Romania.

=== Results ===
Dynamite Fighting Show 5
Weight Class				Method	Round	Time	Notes
Light Heavyweight 81 kg	(Romania) Florin Lambagiu	def.	(Switzerland) Daniel Stefanovski	Decision (unanimous)	3	3:00	
Light Heavyweight 85 kg	(Romania) Bogdan Năstase	def.	(Netherlands) Mike Sprangh	Decision (split)	3	3:00	
Heavyweight 120 kg	(United Kingdom) Dawid Żółtaszek	def.	(Romania) Valentin Bordianu	TKO (referee stoppage)	2	0:25	
Light Heavyweight 81 kg	(Netherlands) Chico Kwasi	def.	(Romania) Daniel Pattvean	Decision (unanimous)	3	3:00	
Middleweight 71 kg	(Netherlands) Damian Johansen	def.	(Romania) Ștefan Irimia	Decision (unanimous)	3	3:00	
Middleweight 71 kg	(Romania) Daniel Corbeanu	def.	(Romania) Rayko Levițchi	Decision (unanimous)	3	3:00	
Middleweight 71 kg	(Romania) Mihai Cîrstea	def.	(Romania) Mihai Ştefan	Decision (unanimous)	3	3:00	
Super Middleweight 77 kg (MMA)	(Romania) Corneliu Lascăr	def.	(Italy) Michelangelo Colangelo	Decision (unanimous)	3	5:00	

=== Awards ===
- Fight of the Night: Florin Lambagiu vs. Daniel Stefanovski

== UFT 8 ==
UFT 8
- Promotion: Ultimate Fighting Tournament
- Date: October 26, 2019
- Venue: Sala Sporturilor Horia Demian
- City: Cluj-Napoca

Event chronology
Dynamite Fighting Show 5	UFT 8	Colosseum Tournament 16

UFT 8 was a mixed martial arts and kickboxing event produced by the Ultimate Fighting Tournament that took place on October 26, 2019, at the Sala Sporturilor Horia Demian in Cluj-Napoca.

== Colosseum Tournament 16 ==
Colosseum Tournament 16
- Promotion: Colosseum Tournament
- Date: October 28, 2019
- Venue: Sala Transilvania
- City: Sibiu, Romania

Event chronology
UFT 8	Colosseum Tournament 16	KO Masters 5

Colosseum Tournament 16 was a kickboxing event produced by the Colosseum Tournament that took place on October 28, 2019, at the Sala Transilvania in Sibiu, Romania.

=== Results ===
Colosseum Tournament 16 (FightBox)
Weight Class				Method	Round	Time	Notes
65 kg	(Moldova) Maxim Răilean	def.	(Romania) Adrian Maxim	TKO (retirement)	3	3:00	Tournament Final. For the inaugural Colosseum Tournament World -65 kg Championship
Heavyweight 120 kg	(Romania) Daniel Natea	def.	(Netherlands) Roel van der Hoek	KO (left jab)	1	0:55	
86 kg	(Romania) Cosmin Ionescu	def.	(Romania) Flavius Nechita	TKO (corner stoppage)	1	2:43	
72,5 kg	(Romania) Andrei Vasinca	def.	(Romania) Andrei Șerban	Decision (unanimous)	3	3:00	
77 kg	(Romania) Flavius Boiciuc	def.	(Romania) Raul Kocsmáros	Decision (unanimous)	3	3:00	
80 kg	(Romania) Adrian Vodă	def.	(Romania) Robert Gontineac	Decision (split)	3	3:00	
65 kg	(Romania) Ionuț Popa	def.	(Moldova) Nicolae Piruțchi	Decision (unanimous)	3	3:00	
80 kg	(Romania) Mircea Dumitrescu	vs.	(Romania) Alexandru Stan	No Contest (head cut)	2	1:33	
65 kg	(Romania) Maxim Răilean	def.	(Cyprus) Levan Revazishvili	Decision	3	3:00	Tournament Semi-Finals
65 kg	(Romania) Adrian Maxim	def.	(Italy) Fabrizio Conti	Decision (unanimous)	3	3:00	Tournament Semi-Finals

== KO Masters 5 ==
KO Masters 5
- Promotion: KO Masters
- Date: November 14, 2019
- Venue: Berăria H
- City: Bucharest, Romania

Event chronology
Colosseum Tournament 16	KO Masters 5	Dynamite Fighting Show 6

KO Masters 5 was a kickboxing event produced by the KO Masters that took place on November 14, 2019, at the Berăria H in Bucharest, Romania.

=== Results ===
KO Masters 5 (Fight Network)
Weight Class				Method	Round	Time	Notes
81 kg	(Romania) Nicu Buceac	def.	(Romania) Dennis Grecu	TKO (referee stoppage/three knockout rule)	1	0:50	
80 kg	(Romania) Daniel Manole	def.	(Romania) Ştefan Albu				
86 kg	(Romania) Ionuţ Spătărelu	def.	(Romania) Robert Hodea	Decision (split)	3	3:00	
Heavyweight 120 kg	(Romania) Costin Mincu	def.	(Romania) Cristian Constantinov	KO (low kicks)	3	2:50	
81 kg	(Romania) Costin Dinu	def.	(Romania) Mircea Dumitrescu	Decision	3	3:00	
Heavyweight 120 kg	(Romania) Alexandru Radnev	def.	(Moldova) Nicolai Garbuz	KO (right punch)	3	2:50	
86 kg	(Romania) Claudiu Alexe	def.	(Romania) Alexandru Cireşescu	KO (knee to head)	1	2:30	
86 kg	(Romania) Dragoș Imbrea	def.	(Romania) Leonard Bonton	KO (left hook)	1	0:30	

== Dynamite Fighting Show 6 ==
Dynamite Fighting Show 6
- Promotion: Dynamite Fighting Show
- Date: November 21, 2019
- Venue: Sala Polivalentă
- City: Iași, Romania
- Attendance: 2,500

Event chronology
KO Masters 5	Dynamite Fighting Show 6	KO Masters 6

Dynamite Fighting Show 6 (also known as David vs. Goliath) was a kickboxing and mixed martial arts event produced by the Dynamite Fighting Show that took place on November 21, 2019, at the Sala Polivalentă in Iași, Romania. The event was sold out.

=== Results ===
Dynamite Fighting Show 6 (Sport Extra)
Weight Class				Method	Round	Time	Notes
Open Weight	(Romania) Florin Lambagiu	def.	(Romania) Anatoli Ciumac	Decision (unanimous)	3	3:00	
Heavyweight 120 kg	(Romania) Cristian Ristea	def.	(Austria) Thomas Froschauer	Decision (split)	3	3:00	
Open Weight	(Romania) Costin Mincu	def.	(Romania) Alex Filip	KO (left punch)	2	2:12	
Heavyweight 120 kg	(Romania) Mihai Cîrstea	def.	(Switzerland) Roustand Mballa	Decision (split)	3	3:00	
Middleweight 70 kg	(Romania) Daniel Corbeanu	def.	(Netherlands) Damian Johansen	Decision (unanimous)	3	3:00	
Super Middleweight 77 kg (MMA)	(Austria) Marko Kisic	def.	(Romania) Corneliu Lascăr	Decision (unanimous)	3	5:00	
Light Heavyweight 81 kg	(Romania) Bogdan Năstase	def.	(Romania) Maxim Zaplîtni	Decision (split)	3	3:00	
Heavyweight 120 kg	(Italy) Marco Pisu	def.	(Romania) Alexandru Radnev	Decision (split)	3	3:00	
Open Weight	(Romania) Vasile Amariței	def.	(Romania) Ionuț Iancu	Decision (unanimous)	3	3:00	
Lightweight 67 kg (MMA)	(Romania) Cătălin Mircea	def.	(Ukraine) Anton Lazebnov	TKO (knee/punches)	2	0:25	

=== Awards ===
- Fight of the Night: Cristian Ristea vs. Thomas Froschauer

== KO Masters 6 ==
KO Masters 6
- Promotion: KO Masters
- Date: November 25, 2019
- Venue: Berăria H
- City: Bucharest, Romania

Event chronology
Dynamite Fighting Show 6	KO Masters 6	GFC 6

KO Masters 6 was a kickboxing event produced by the KO Masters that took place on November 25, 2019, at the Berăria H in Bucharest, Romania.

=== Results ===
KO Masters 6 (Fight Network)
Weight Class				Method	Round	Time	Notes
86 kg	(Romania) Claudiu Alexe	def.	(Poland) Janilson da Cruz	TKO (arm injury)	1	0:50	
81 kg	(Romania) Cristian Măniţă	def.	(Romania) Paul Cucerzan	KO (body kick)	1	1:40	
Heavyweight 120 kg	(Romania) Ion Grigore	def.	(Serbia) Dejan Aranđelović	KO (uppercut)	1	0:35	
75 kg	(Romania) Mirel Drăgan	def.	(Serbia) Mihajlo Rajić	KO (punches to the body)	2	1:43	
Women's 60 kg	(Romania) Andreea Cebuc	def.	(Romania) Dalia Ciocan	Decision (unanimous)	3	3:00	
81 kg	(Moldova) Dumitru Cavliuc	def.	(Romania) Dumitru Maliș	KO (low kick)	2	1:30	
86 kg	(Romania) Adrian Gagiu	def.	(Moldova) Cătălin Anton	Decision (unanimous)	3	3:00	
81 kg	(Romania) Nicu Buceac	def.	(Romania) Dan Tudoran	TKO (retirement)	3	2:05	
63,5 kg	(Romania) Marian Soare	def.	(Romania) Ionel Bălan	Decision (split)	3	3:00	
55 kg	(Romania) Robert Hu Hua Long	def.	(Romania) Alexandru Parnică	Decision (unanimous)	3	3:00	

== GFC 6 ==
GFC 6
- Promotion: Golden Fighter Championship
- Date: November 29, 2019
- Venue: Sala Constantin Jude
- City: Timișoara, Romania

Event chronology
KO Masters 6	GFC 6	Colosseum Tournament 17

GFC 6 (also known as Romania vs. Netherlands) was a kickboxing event produced by the Golden Fighter Championship that took place on November 29, 2019, at the Sala Constantin Jude in Timișoara, Romania.

=== Results ===
GFC 6 (FightBox)
Weight Class				Method	Round	Time	Notes
83 kg	(Romania) Adrian Mitu	vs.	(Greece) Alexandridis Triantafillos	No Contest (leg injury)	1	0:45	For the GFC World -83 kg Championship
Light Welterweight 65 kg	(Romania) Adrian Maxim	def.	(Moldova) Petru Morari	Decision (unanimous)	5	3:00	For the GFC European Light Welterweight Championship
88 kg	(Netherlands) Michael Boapeah	def.	(Romania) Robert Constantin	Decision (unanimous)	3	3:00	
Heavyweight 120 kg	(Netherlands) Muhammed Balli	def.	(Romania) Marius Munteanu	Decision (unanimous)	3	3:00	
72 kg	(Romania) Gabriel Bozan	def.	(Netherlands) Dominique Pinas	KO (punches)	3	2:15	
Super Cruiserweight 95 kg	(Netherlands) Jimmy Livinus	def.	(Romania) Alin Văcareanu	Decision (split)	3	3:00	
Light Cruiserweight 84 kg	(Netherlands) Onur Şahin	def.	(Romania) Radu Medeleanu	Decision (split)	3	3:00	
76 kg	(Romania) Haris Ferizović	def.	(Romania) Raul Kocsmáros	KO (right hook)	4	2:29	
Light Heavyweight 80 kg	(Romania) Flavius Nechita	def.	(Romania) Sorin Horváth	KO (low kick)	3	1:20	

== Colosseum Tournament 17 ==
Colosseum Tournament 17
- Promotion: Colosseum Tournament
- Date: December 1, 2019
- Venue: Sala Polivalentă
- City: Bucharest, Romania

Event chronology
GFC 6	Colosseum Tournament 17	Mix Kombat 5

Colosseum Tournament 17 was a kickboxing event produced by the Colosseum Tournament that took place on December 1, 2019, at the Sala Polivalentă in Bucharest, Romania.

=== Results ===
Colosseum Tournament 17 (FightBox)
Weight Class				Method	Round	Time	Notes
Open Weight	(Romania) Alexandru Lungu	def.	(United Kingdom) Bradost Bradosti	KO (right punch)	1	1:27	
91 kg	(Romania) Cosmin Ionescu	def.	(Romania) Robert Burtea	KO (right high kick)	1	1:20	
71 kg	(Romania) Andrei Ostrovanu	def.	(Burkina Faso) Issouf Nanni	KO (liver punch)	2	1:06	
75 kg	(Romania) Marian Dinu	def.	(Romania) Alin Cîmpan	Decision (split)	3	3:00	
81 kg	(Romania) Adelin Mihăilă	def.	(Romania) Tiberiu Iote	Decision (unanimous)	3	3:00	
86 kg	(Romania) Dragoș Imbrea	def.	(Romania) Daniel Scipcaru	KO (right punch)	2	1:15	
81 kg	(Romania) Costin Dinu	def.	(Romania) Alexandru Stan	TKO (referee stoppage/three knockdown rule)	1	2:58	
65 kg	(Romania) Silviu Ionescu	def.	(Romania) David Constantin	Decision (unanimous)	3	3:00	
72,5 kg	(Romania) Alexandru Voicu	def.	(Romania) Andrei Șerban	TKO (referee stoppage)	3	2:52	
67 kg	(Romania) Răzvan Mustață	def.	(Romania) Vlăduț Oprică	TKO (retirement/shoulder injury)	1	3:00	
61 kg	(Romania) Iulian Marinescu	def.	(Romania) Aurel Ghiță	Decision (unanimous)	3	3:00	

== Mix Kombat 5 ==
Mix Kombat 5
- Promotion: Mix Kombat
- Date: December 7, 2019
- Venue: Sala Polivalentă
- City: Bistrița, Romania

Event chronology
Colosseum Tournament 17	Mix Kombat 5	Fight Zone 6

Mix Kombat 5 was a kickboxing event produced by the Mix Kombat that took place on December 7, 2019, at the Sala Polivalentă in Bistrița, Romania.

=== Results ===
Mix Kombat 5
Weight Class				Method	Round	Time	Notes
95+ kg	(Romania) Cristian Ristea	def.	(Germany) Jürgen Dolch	TKO (referee stoppage/three knockout rule)	1	2:45	
72 kg	(Romania) Bogdan Suru	def.	(Italy) Diego Enzo	TKO (towel thrown)	1	1:44	
85 kg	(Romania) Mădălin Mogoș	def.	(Hungary) Gábor Meszlényi	Decision (majority)	3	3:00	
91 kg	(Romania) Sebastian Lutaniuc	def.	(Hungary) Merse Bakai	Decision (split)	3	3:00	
72,5 kg	(Romania) Anghel Cardoș	def.	(Italy) Andrea Enzo	Decision (unanimous)	3	3:00	
71 kg	(Romania) Daniel Bolfă	def.	(Italy) Nino Raia	TKO (towel thrown)	3	1:12	
67 kg	(Romania) Marian Lăpușneanu	def.	(Romania) Alexandru Marton	Decision (unanimous)	3	3:00	
86 kg	(Romania) Emilian Sângeorzan	def.	(Romania) Ionuț Spătărelu	TKO (referee stoppage/punches)	2	2:48	
95+ kg	(Romania) Ionuț Iancu	def.	(Romania) Horațiu Pop	TKO (referee stoppage/punches)	1	1:35	
75 kg	(Romania) Andrei Șumfelean	def.	(Ukraine) Alexander Gushuvatij	Decision (unanimous)	3	3:00	
Undercard
95+ kg	(Romania) Daniel Morar	vs.	(Ukraine) Aleksey Suleak	Draw	3	3:00	
60 kg	(Switzerland) Murat Abdou	def.	(Romania) Bogdan Medvischi	Decision	3	3:00	
86 kg	(Romania) Dragoș Imbrea	def.	(Romania) Daniel Scipcaru	KO (right punch)	2	1:15	
72,5 kg	(Romania) Alexandru Voicu	def.	(Romania) Andrei Șerban	TKO (referee stoppage)	3	2:52	
62,5 kg	(Romania) George Aluaș	def.	(Romania) Bogdan Floriștean	Decision	3	3:00	

== Fight Zone 6 ==
Fight Zone 6
- Promotion: Fight Zone
- Date: December 20, 2019
- Venue: Sala Sporturilor
- City: Deva, Romania

Event chronology
Mix Kombat 5	Fight Zone 6	OSS Fighters 05

Fight Zone 6 was a kickboxing and boxing event produced by the Fight Zone that took place on December 20, 2019, at the Sala Sporturilor in Deva, Romania.

=== Results ===
Main Card
Weight Class				Method	Round	Time	Notes
Heavyweight	(Romania) Marius Munteanu	def.	(Moldova) Anatoli Ciumac	Decision (unanimous)	3	3:00	For the vacant Fight Zone Heavyweight Championship
Middleweight	(Romania) Flavius Boiciuc	def.	(Guinea-Bissau) Janu da Cruz	KO (liver kick)	1	2:02	For the Fight Zone Middleweight Championship
Heavyweight (Boxing)	(Romania) Eugen Mailat	def.	(Poland) Tomasz Czerwiński	Decision (unanimous)	3	3:00	
Light Heavyweight	(Romania) Costin Mincu	def.	(Romania) Fery Alionte	Decision (unanimous)	3	3:00	For the Fight Zone Light Heavyweight Championship

== See also ==
- 2019 in Glory
- 2019 in ONE Championship
- 2019 in RXF
