= Udricani Church =

Orthodox church in Bucharest, Romania

Coordinates: 44°25′47″N 26°06′37″E

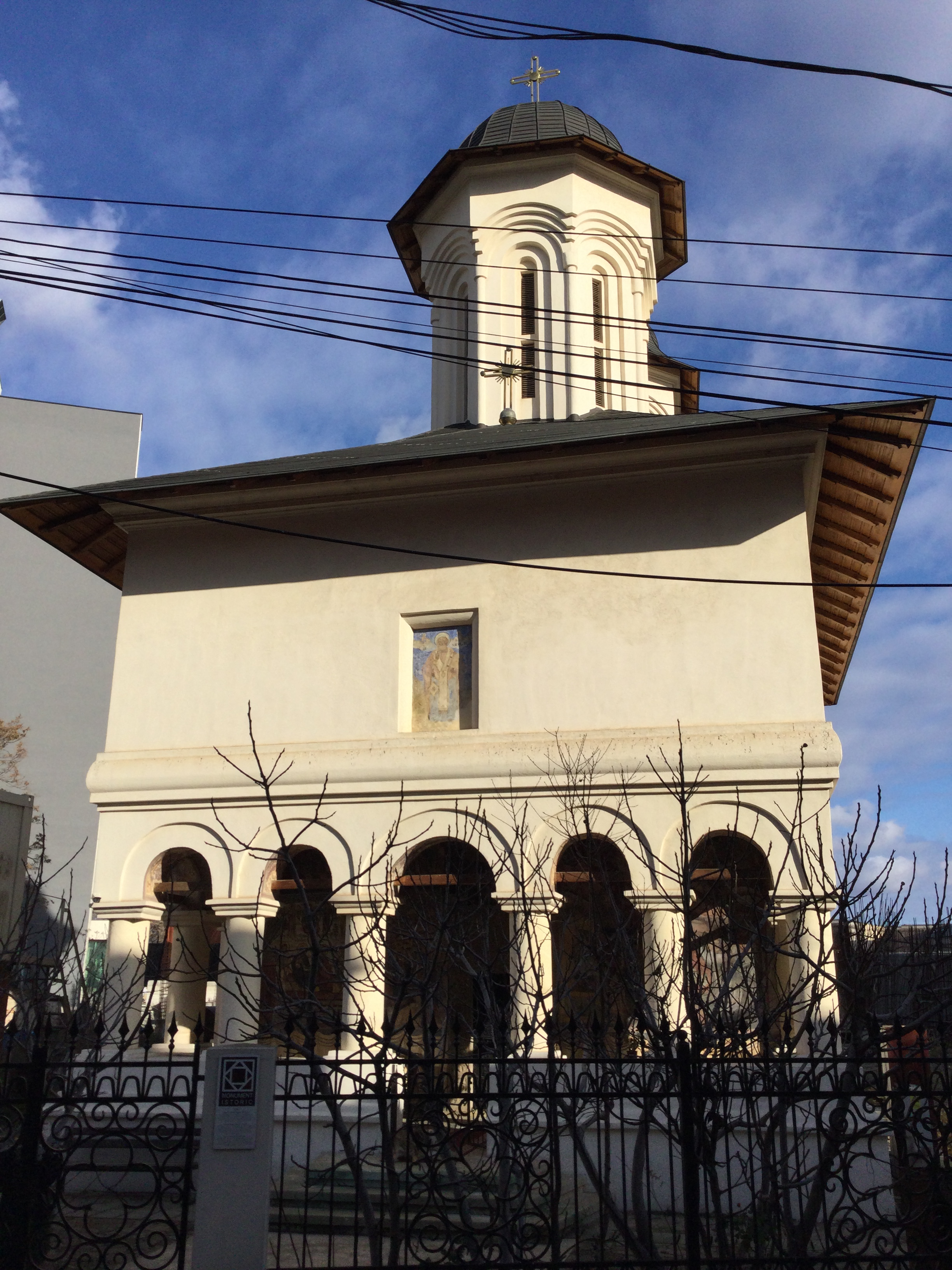
Udricani Church

The Udricani Church (Romanian: Biserica Udricani) is a Romanian Orthodox church located at 11 Iuliu Barasch Street in Bucharest, Romania. It is dedicated to Saint Nicholas.

== History ==
As recorded in the pisanie, the church was built in 1735, with Jupân Udrecan Clucerul as ktetor. It was shortly placed under the authority of St. John’s Monastery in Focșani, freeing it from various taxes levied by the Prince of Wallachia. It likely had a courtyard, monastic cells and a bell tower; Ban Mihail Cantacuzino records it around 1770. A Romanian school functioned in the cells at the end of the 18th century, as later recorded by Ion Ghica. Archaeological work carried out after 2005 unearthed the presence of a cemetery on the south side, containing 130 graves from the 17th through 19th centuries, as well as religious objects, seals, rings, coins and pottery. The excavations also indicated that an older church once stood on the site, probably a modest wooden structure with a brick foundation.

The damage sustained during the 1802 earthquake was repaired by Paharnic Nicolae in 1810. Following a series of five smaller earthquakes during the 1820s and '30s, further repairs were carried out in 1834. More damage, repaired subsequently, was caused by the 1838 quake. The Great Fire of Bucharest in 1847 burned the church and the bell tower, to the west, which also served as a gate. The 1848 pisanie, located in the narthex, notes that the former abbot from Focșani carried out the repairs. The tower remained half destroyed, with the bells hanging from four wooden poles. It was demolished in 1936–1937 in order to make way for an apartment building.

The weakened masonry domes weee also removed in 1848 and replaced by wooden ones coated in tin. Other repairs took place in 1856, 1864, and 1877, while a robbery occurred in 1857. The school was renovated around that time. Later, a new building, still in existence, was added on the east side and used as a shelter for the poor. In 1937, a visiting Nicolae Iorga was struck by the church’s state of decay, ordering immediate repairs as head of the Historic Monuments Commission. A thorough plan was drawn up and intermittently executed between 1937 and 1945. Due to a lack of funds, the only elements carried out were the dome and roof repairs, the floor and window renovations and the replacement of the main door with one resembling its counterpart at Neamț Monastery. More repairs were undertaken following the 1940 and 1977 earthquakes. Between 1984 and 1989, the Nicolae Ceaușescu regime threatened the church with demolition. In 1985–1986, the surrounding buildings, largely belonging to the Jewish community, were torn down as part of the Centrul Civic project. A 1998 exterior consolidation was only partial, and destroyed traces of frescoes.

== Description ==
The cross-shaped church measures 24.6 meters long by 9.2 meters wide, rising to 8 meters high at the cornice and 17 meters at the dome. A typical 18th-century church, it features an open portico, an extended narthex, a dome above the nave and a bell tower on the narthex: both octagonal, on square bases, initially of masonry, now of tin-plated wood. Entry into the portico is through an arch. An 1810 intervention completely enclosed the arches in masonry; these were opened up during a restoration carried out between 2005 and 2010, meant to bring the church back to its original appearance. The portico is as high as the nave, with a spherical ceiling. During its enclosed phase, light entered through two small windows on the west side and one each on the north and south. The painting, once blackened by age but since cleaned, dates to the 18th century on the ceiling and to 1810 on the walls. There are four graves, from 1764, 1775 and 1830.

Next comes the narthex, entered through a portal carved in stone, where the pisanie is placed. Once separated from the nave by three arches resting on columns, it too has a spherical ceiling, on which sits the original bell tower base. The tholobate is from 1847-1848, while the painting was added after 1847. Passage into the nave is through a very wide double arch, replacing the old arches, probably eliminated in 1847. Two original columns with pedestal and capital remain, attached to the north and south walls. The nave retains the arches that support the masonry base of the Pantocrator dome. The apses have vaulted ceilings painted in 1847. The altar apse has a similar ceiling, resting on consoles.

The original exterior was plastered and covered in watercolor frescoes; today, just the plaster remains. A string course of bricks in profile divides the upper and lower parts of the facade almost evenly. The windows have stone frames, simple and protruding, perhaps original to the construction. The western facade has a triangular tympanum, probably emerging from a neoclassical pediment added in 1847–1848. Immediately below this, and above the string course, there is a niche painted with an icon of the patron saint. The fairly large yard, planted with bushes and trees, entirely surrounds the church. The wooden bell tower, dated 1936–1937, is in the northeast corner. The parish house, on the south side of the yard, is separated by a fence.

The church is listed as a historic monument by Romania's Ministry of Culture and Religious Affairs.
