= Bucharest Bărăția =

Coordinates: 44°25′51.64″N 26°6′14.37″E

The Church of Saint Mary of Graces
- Biserica Sf. Maria a Harurilor (Romanian)
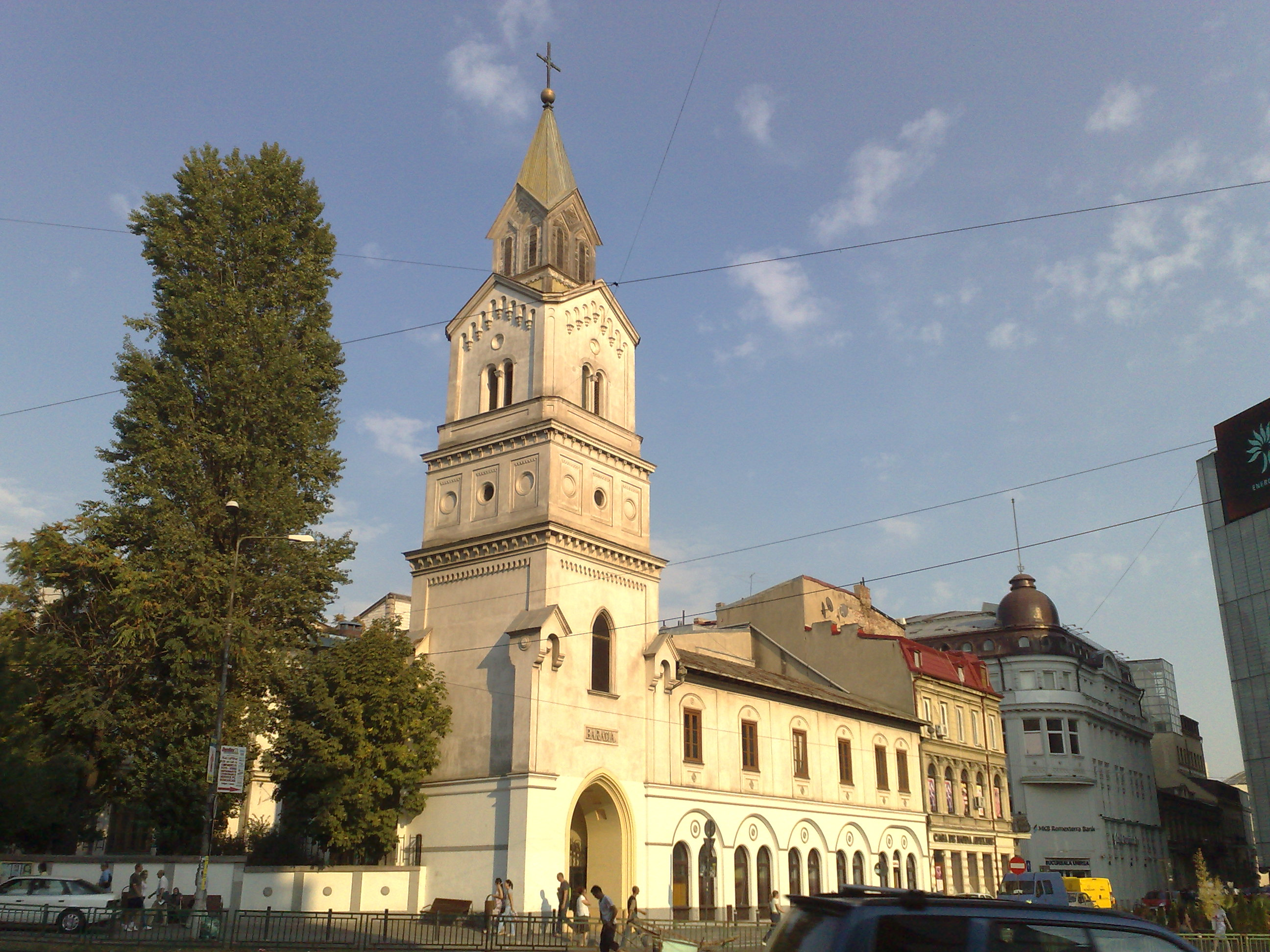
- The Church of Saint Mary of Graces
- Location: Bucharest
- Address: Str. Bărăției nr. 27, Sector 3
- Country: Romania
- Language(s): Romanian, Hungarian, German
- Denomination: Roman Catholic Church
- Tradition: Latin Church

History
- Status: Parish church
- Founded: 1629
- Dedication: Nativity of Mary

Architecture
- Functional status: Active
- Architect: Carol Cortobius
- Style: Romanesque
- Completed: 1850

Administration
- Archdiocese: Bucharest
- Parish: Parish of Saint Mary of Graces

Clergy
- Rector: Cristinel Țâmpu
- Vicar: Paul Aurel Isciuc

Bărăția is one of the Roman Catholic churches in Bucharest, Romania. It is located in central Bucharest, on the I. C. Brătianu Boulevard, next to Piața Unirii.

== Name ==
Its name, used in antiquated Romanian for several Catholic churches, is derived from a Hungarian word of Slavic origin, barát, meaning "brother" or "monk".

== History ==
The history of the church can be traced back to 1314, when Franciscan friars built a wooden church near the early settlements at the location of present-day Bucharest, mainly for Italian merchants traveling to the Byzantine Empire.

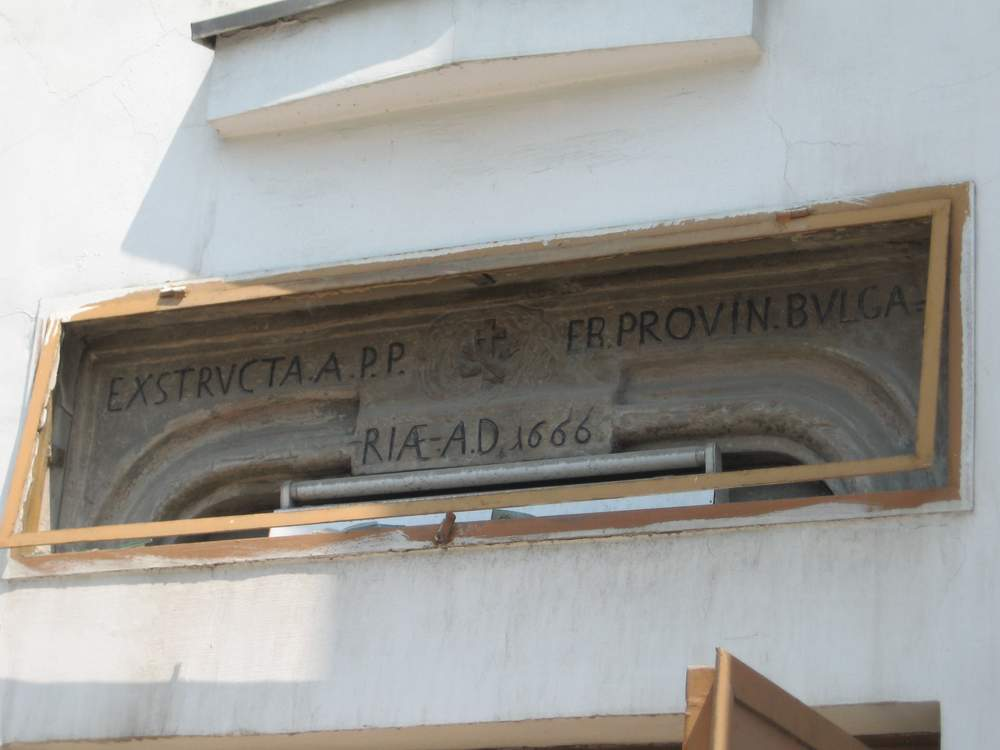
Inscription from 1666 saying it was built by Franciscans from the "Province of Bulgaria"

Bucharest was founded in 1459, and the wooden church rebuilt several times. In 1629–1633, a new stone church was constructed by Franciscan friars from the Province of Bulgaria. In 1716, the Wallachian Prince Ștefan Cantacuzino promised that he would repair it, but he had to abdicate that same year. Leopold I donated 1,500 golden ducats for the repairs, to which Prince Nicholas Mavrocordatos contributed a further 280 ducats, and the work was finished in 1741.

The church burnt down during the 1847 Bucharest fire and its reconstruction, which ended in 1848, was financed by the Imperial House of Vienna, which donated 4,000 guilders. The big bell was cast in 1855, being financed by Emperor Franz Joseph I of Austria.

During the Communist era, many buildings of the parish were demolished or confiscated by the State. The church underwent a major renovation in 1954.

== Bărăția today ==
Masses are celebrated three times on weekdays and six times on Sunday; including those in Hungarian and German languages for the city's minorities.
