= Italian Church (Bucharest) =

Heritage site in Bucharest, Romania

Coordinates: 44°26′23″N 26°06′02″E

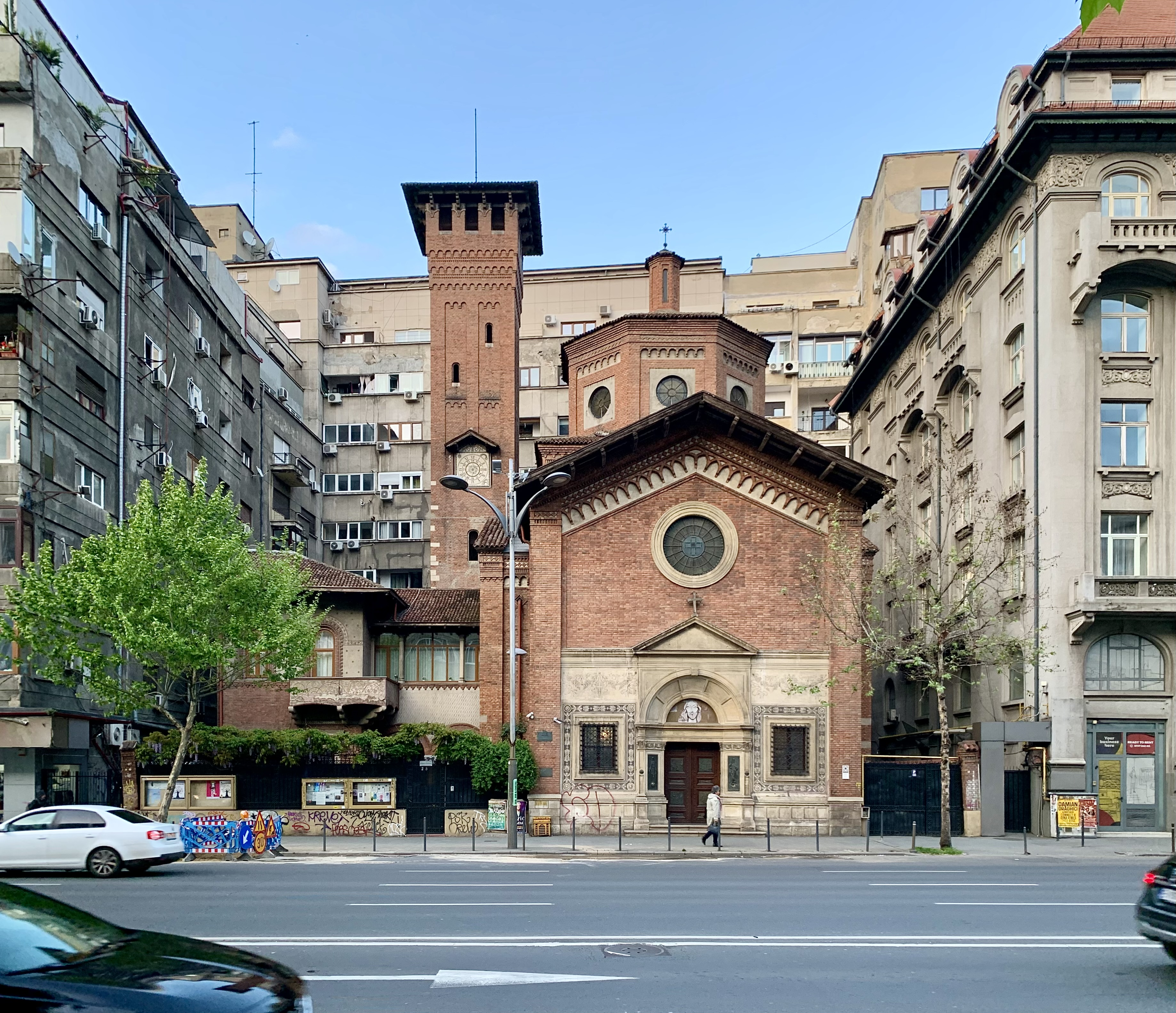
The Italian Church, Bucharest, surrounded by apartment blocks

The Italian Church of the Most Holy Redeemer (Romanian: Biserica Italiană "Preasfântul Mântuitor") is a Roman Catholic church located in Bucharest, Romania, at 28 Nicolae Bălcescu Boulevard.

The Lombard Romanesque red brick edifice was built between 1915–1916 and consecrated by bishop Raymond Netzhammer in 1916. It is owned by the Italian government and surrounded by apartment blocks. Services are held in Romanian, Polish, and Italian.

== Gallery ==
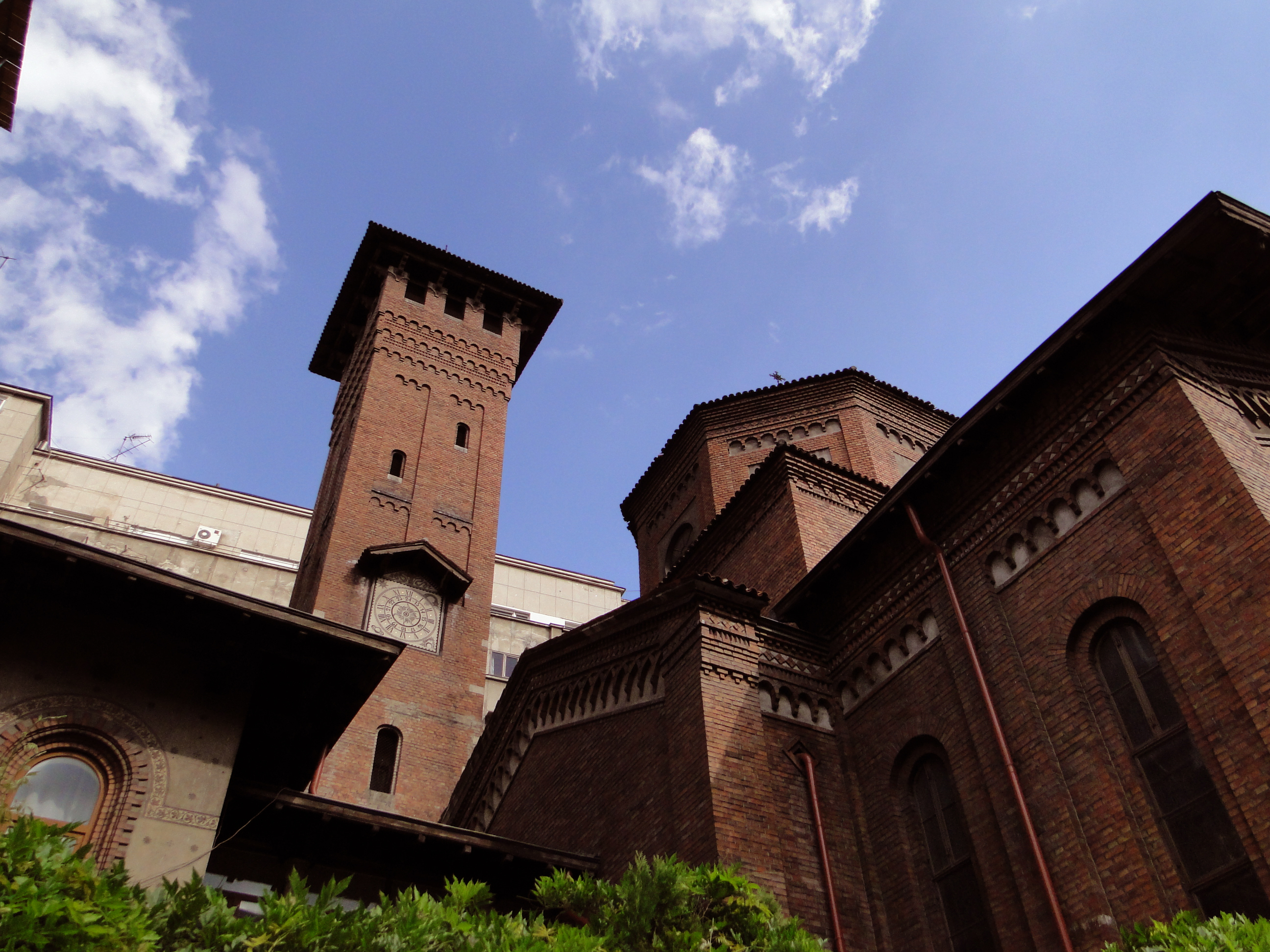
Tower and brickwork

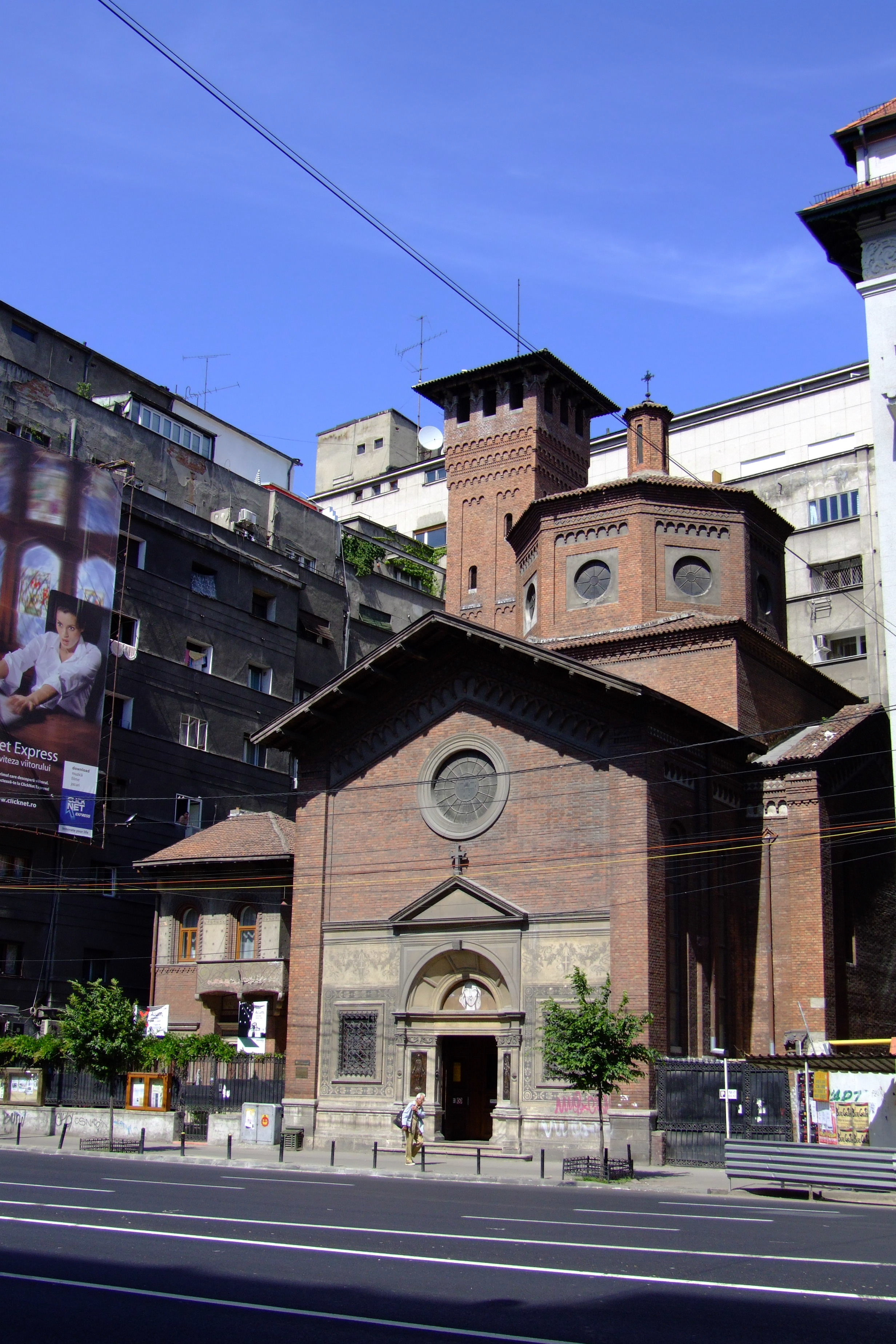
Frontage

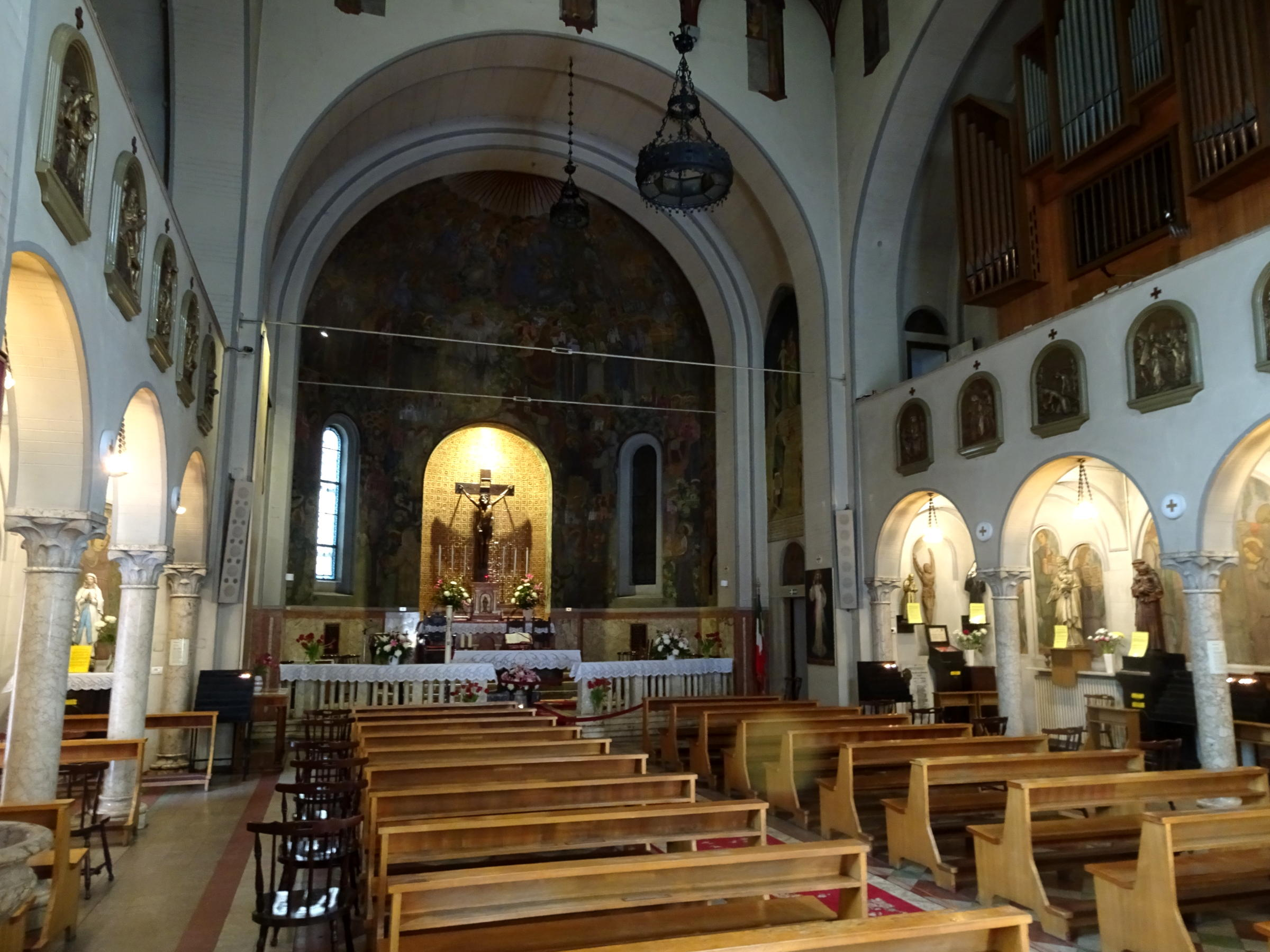
Nave

Sanctuary

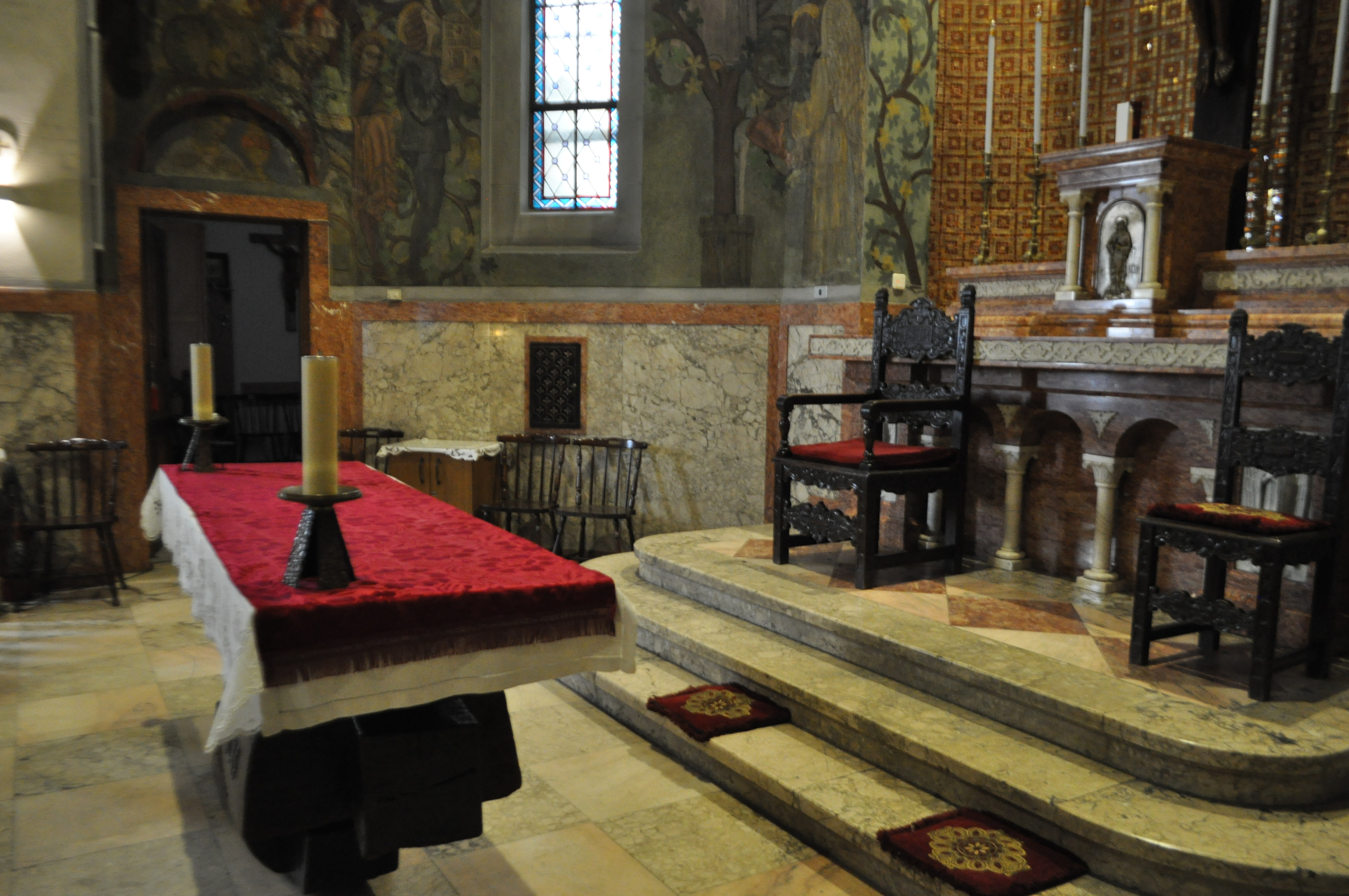
Altar

Frescos and Stations of the Cross
