= Basarab railway station =

Railway station in Bucharest, Romania

Coordinates: 44°27′1.59″N 26°4′3.27″E

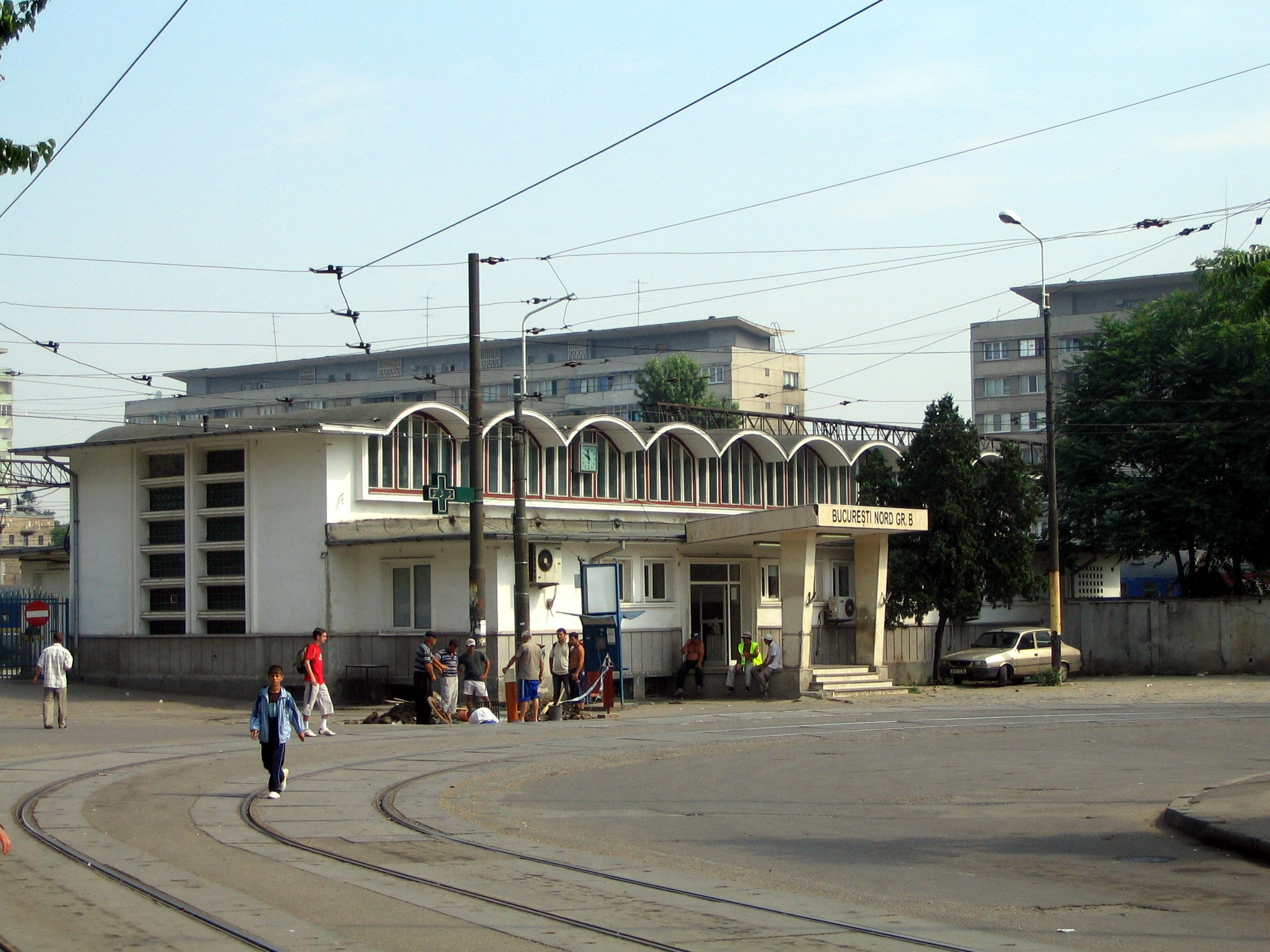
Basarab railway station

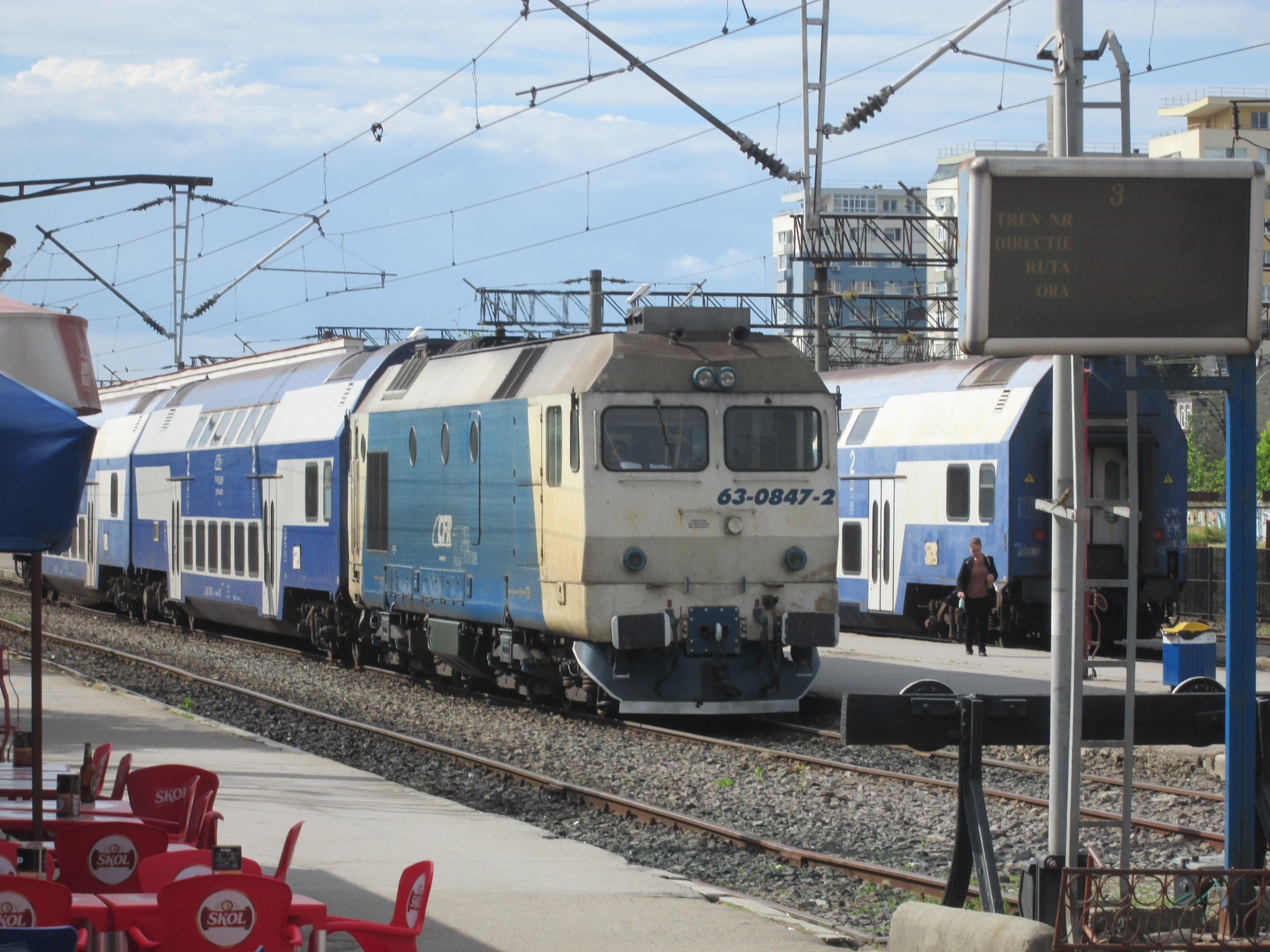
Train at the station

Basarab railway station (Romanian: Gara Basarab) in Bucharest is situated near the city's main station, Gara de Nord. Built in 1959 to handle a share of the main station's traffic and mainly used by short-distance commuter trains run by Căile Ferate Române, it is often considered to be an annex of Gara de Nord, to which it was linked by a footbridge, demolished in 2009 to make way for the Basarab Overpass.

Basarab railway station is served directly by the Bucharest Metro system, via Basarab metro station. The underground passageway to the Metro station can also be used to cross the train tracks of Gara de Nord, since it has exits on both sides of the tracks.

RATB lines:

- Tram lines: 1 (on the Basarab Bridge), 35, and 44.
- Trolleybus lines: 65 and 86 (only Grivița side).
- Bus lines: 105, 123, 133, 162, 178, 282.
- Express Bus lines: 780 (Basarab railway station – Henri Coandă International Airport).
