= Great Fire of Bucharest =

1847 conflagration in Bucharest, Romania

Coordinates: 44°25′51.24″N 26°5′53.23″E

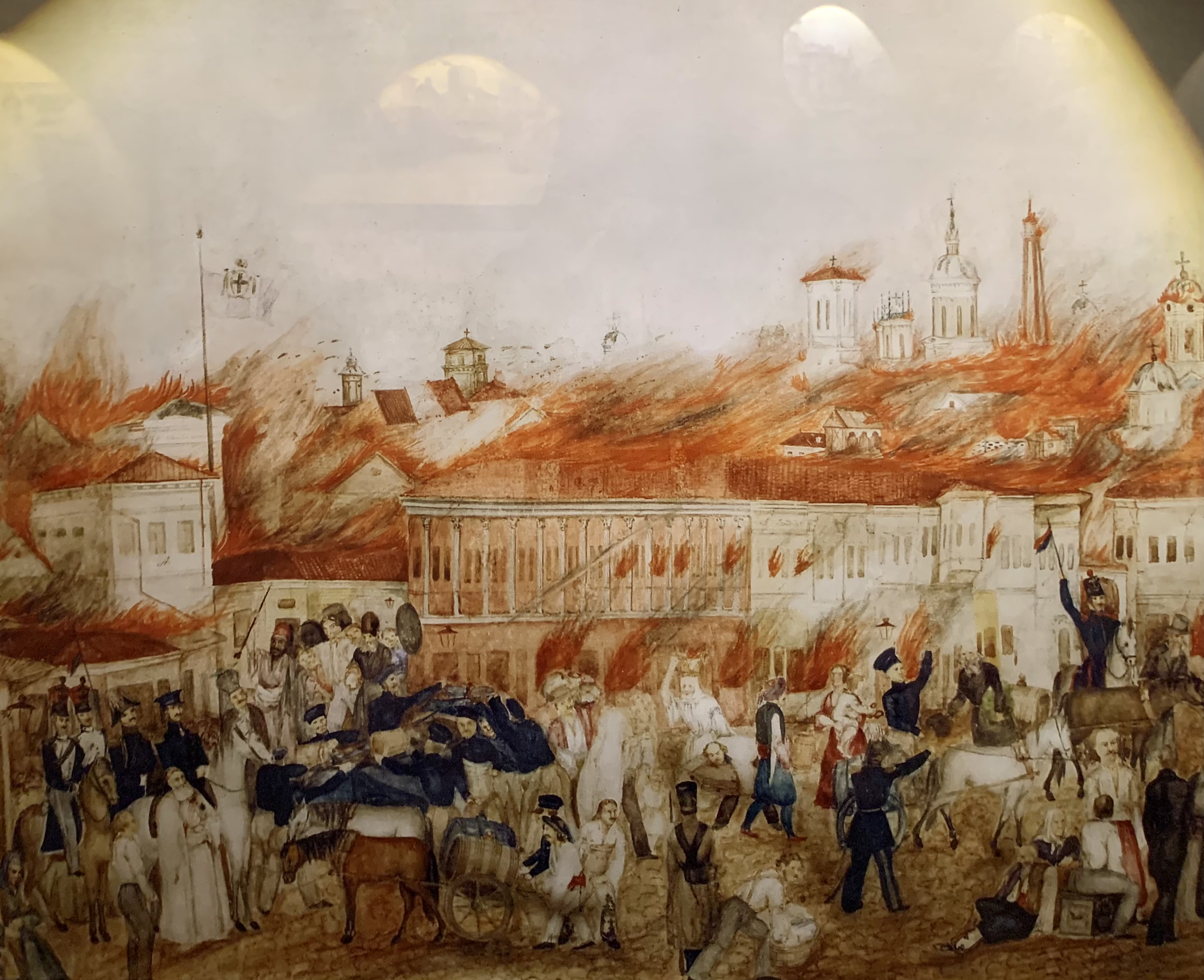
Great Fire of Bucharest, watercolour by Mustacoff

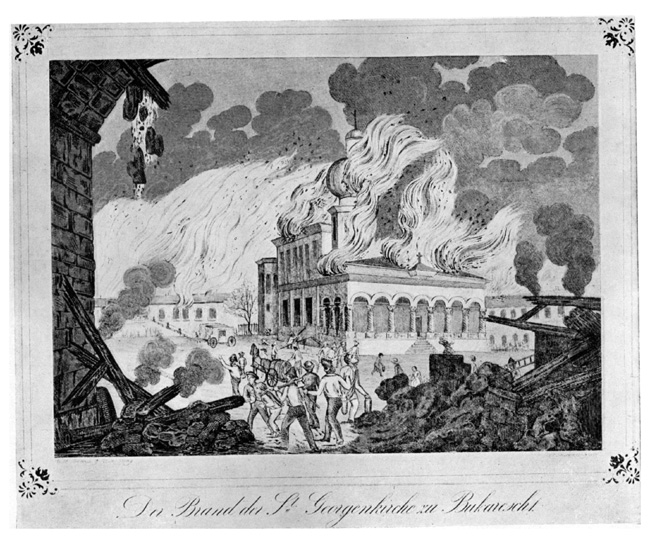
New St. George's Church burning

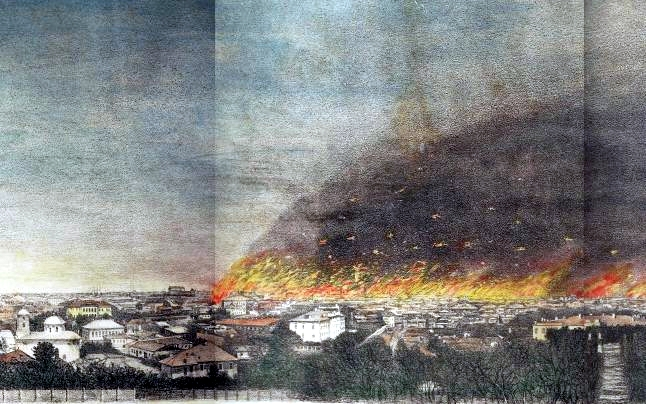
Great Fire of Bucharest, coloured engraving

The Great Fire of Bucharest (Romanian: Marele incendiu din București or simply Focul cel mare) was the largest conflagration ever to occur in Bucharest, Romania, then the capital of Wallachia. It started on 23 March 1847 and destroyed 1850 buildings, a third of the city, including, according to Prince Gheorghe Bibescu, "the most populated and richest part of Bucharest".

The fire destroyed the central commercial part of the city, replacing the small and crowded wooden buildings with two-story brick merchants' and craftsmen's houses, inspired by those in Austria, having their shops and warehouses at the first floor and the habitation at the second floor.

== Background ==
At the time, many of the houses of Bucharest were made out of wood, which, together with the crowded narrow streets, made them prone to fire. The constant danger made this a concern ever since the Phanariote era, when fire watches were organized around the Aghia and the Spătar's residence. During the Organic Regulations era, a modern firemen squad was organized, equipped with Western European pumpers.

== The fire ==
The fire started during the afternoon at the house of the Cluceress Zoița Drugăneasca, near the metochion of the Buzău bishopric, at the St. Demetrius Church.

The strong southern wind (austru) helped it to spread in a triangular area with one corner at the house where it started and the two vertices going one towards Curtea Veche and the Artillery building (Pușcăria) and the other towards Lipscani, St. George's Inn and St. George's Monastery. The fire spread towards the outskirts of the city, where it couldn't spread anymore as the yards of the houses were larger and the fire couldn't spread from one house to the next as easily as in the crowded commercial center.

The rest of the city was not burnt thanks to the firemen's intervention who were also helped by the soldiers.

The fire burnt the St. Demetrius mahala (neighbourhood), the commercial streets Ulița Franțuzească (present-day Strada Franceză), Ulița Nemțească (present-day Strada Smârdan), Șelari, the artillery building in Piața de Flori, Lipscani (from Picollo to Marchitani), Hanul lui Zamfir, Bărăția, the Papazoglu Inn, New and Old St. George's Churches, Târgul Cucului, Mahalaua Stelei, Udricani, St. Vineri, Lucaci, St. Stephan and other areas.

The fire killed 15 people and burnt 158,730 square stânjeni (ca. 61.38 hectares), including 1850 buildings, including 686 private homes, 1142 shops, 10 inns and 12 churches. The damage was then estimated at 100 million lei.

== Reconstruction ==
=== Reconstruction fund ===
After the fire was put out, the authorities began a reconstruction process. A fund was created for the rebuilding of the city. The Prince, Gheorghe Bibescu was the first to donate 6000 lei, with the rest of the institutions contributed 2,200,000 lei:

- the Romanian Orthodox Church Metropolis contributed a quarter of its annual income, 500,000 lei
- the National Bank contributed all its income, 220,000 lei
- the Romanian Monasteries owned by the Greek Church, 700,000 lei
- the Treasury contributed its reserve fund, 300,000 lei
- the clerks and soldiers contributed one month's wages, 300,000 lei
- the City Hall association contributed 180,000 lei

The royal courts of Vienna, Stamboul and Petersburg contributed as well, as did the merchants of Leipzig and bankers (Rothschild family and Sinas), who contributed 3401 thalers (45,584 lei). The Moldavians, led by Vasile Alecsandri, had also a significant contribution of 50,715 lei. Additional contributions came from Bucharesters not affected by the fire, as well as from Wallachians living outside the capital (276,357 lei).

=== Reconstruction commission ===
For helping the people who lost their homes and businesses, a merchants' commission was created which had to oversee the usage of the reconstruction fund and help resume trade. It also levied mandatory contributions from the clerks' wages and church's incomes. The commission members were Ion Otetelișanu, Mihai Califarov and Lazăr Kalenderoglu.

The commission began a census of the burnt buildings, gathering information on the owners' and renters' names, the owner's profession, the type of the buildings, the value of the house, the value of the things inside, etc. On 26 June 1847 the list was published, containing the details of how the sum of 2,573,250 lei will be divided to 1559 affected property owners.

The biggest sums of aid money were given to the affected boyars, important merchants and even relatives of the commission members (such as Elenca Califarov, receiving 8000 lei), some of them receiving over 10,000 lei, while many of the poorer people receiving only 100-200 lei. This led to discontent, with some poorer craftsmen sending petitions and refusing to accept the sums.

Foreign consuls also intervened distributing money on their own: the Russian consul distributed a sum of 236,800 lei, while the French consul intervened with a list of 12 protégés whom they considered that they didn't receive a fair compensation.

A final report was published in April 1848, when the commission's report said that 52 people still refused to get their aid money and that a sum of 3,195,759 lei was divided to 2887 people affected. The Bucharest Metropolis kept some money of those which it had to pay, in order to rebuild the burnt churches: 12,000 lei for Old St. George's Church, 8000 lei for Vergului Church, 10,000 for Lucaci Church, 6000 lei for St. Stephan's Church, 8000 lei for Ceauș Radu Church and 6000 lei for Olteni Church.

=== City systematization ===
At the suggestion of a civil clerk who remained in Wallachia from the time of the Russian military administration, the government took some measures for the systematization of the areas of the city that were destroyed by the fire. For this, a sum of 230,552 was withdrawn from the reconstruction fund in order to paid to the land owners who had their land expropriated.

Major Rudolf Arthur von Borroczyn, the head of the technical section had a major role in the city planning. He proposed that the streets should follow the same directions, just that they should be made wider and the buildings should follow some safety rules.
