= Bamboo Club =

Romanian-based chain of nightclubs

- Company type: Private company
- Industry: Nightclubs
- Founded: 2002
- Number of locations: Mamaia, Romania; Brașov, Romania; Miami Beach, Florida, United States
- Owner: Giosue "Joshua" Castellano
- Parent: Bamboo Group Entertainment

Bamboo Club, nicknamed Bamboo, is a Romanian-based chain of nightclubs with headquarters in Bucharest, Romania, owned and operated by Giosue "Joshua" Castellano. The first club was opened in the capital of Romania in 2002. Bamboo Group Entertainment also includes clubs in Brașov, Mamaia and Miami Beach. Red Club and Le Gaga clubs in Bucharest together with Bamboo Ballroom, Bamboo Fitness, Bamboo Luxury and Bamboo Pool are also part of the franchise. On January 21, 2017, the Bucharest Bamboo Club was completely destroyed by a fire. There were no victims, but many attendants were injured.

== Bamboo Miami ==
The Romanian-based Group took over the historic Paris Theatre and renovated it, preserving its classic Art Deco ornamentation. The venue features now a 2 ton Swarovski crystal chandelier and was supplied with Audio Formula L-Acoustics loudspeaker system.

== Franchises ==
Romania

- Bucharest.
- Mamaia.
- Brașov.
- Cluj-Napoca

United States

- Miami Beach, Florida (located at Paris Theatre on 550 Washington Avenue, South Beach).

== See also ==
- List of electronic dance music venues
